= That '70s Show season 3 =

Season of television series

That '70s Show
- Season 3
- DVD cover
- Starring: Topher Grace; Mila Kunis; Ashton Kutcher; Danny Masterson; Laura Prepon; Wilmer Valderrama; Debra Jo Rupp; Kurtwood Smith; Tanya Roberts; Don Stark; Lisa Robin Kelly
- No. of episodes: 25

Release
- Original network: Fox
- Original release: October 3, 2000 – May 22, 2001

Season chronology
- ← Previous; Season 2 Next → Season 4

The third season of That '70s Show, an American television series, aired on Fox from October 3, 2000, to May 22, 2001. The region 1 DVD was released on November 15, 2005. The majority of this season is set in 1977, although the year changed to 1978 for the final four episodes of the season.

Central storylines this season include Eric and Donna dealing with some harsh realities of their relationship as they begin to grow apart. Kelso dates Laurie, but still harbors lingering feelings for Jackie and ultimately tries to win her back. Hyde sees his father for the first time in many years, and they slowly make up for lost time. Kitty tries to get Laurie to make something of herself. The Pinciottis get their own tough times saga when Bob's store goes out business. Fez gets a steady girlfriend, but she is not all that she seems. Red and Kitty continue to get frustrated and annoyed by Bob and Midge's fads.

== Cast ==
=== Main ===
- Topher Grace as Eric Forman
- Mila Kunis as Jackie Burkhart
- Ashton Kutcher as Michael Kelso
- Danny Masterson as Steven Hyde
- Laura Prepon as Donna Pinciotti
- Wilmer Valderrama as Fez
- Debra Jo Rupp as Kitty Forman
- Kurtwood Smith as Red Forman
- Tanya Roberts as Midge Pinciotti
- Don Stark as Bob Pinciotti
- Lisa Robin Kelly (Note: Credited until "Ice Shack" and again in "Fez Gets the Girl".) as Laurie Forman

=== Special guest ===
- Tommy Chong as Leo
- Shirley Jones as Herself
- Valerie Harper as Paula
- John Ratzenberger as Glen

=== Special guest appearance ===
- Howard Hesseman as Max

=== Special appearance ===
- Charo as Herself
- Robert Hays as Bud Hyde
- Alice Cooper as Himself

=== Recurring ===
- Allison Munn as Caroline

=== Guest ===
- Jim Beaver as Tony
- Curtis Armstrong as Barry Donavan
- Danny Bonaduce as Ricky
- Kevin McDonald as Pastor Dave
- Nick Bakay as Donna's Journal
- Joe Flaherty as Bryan
- Dave Thomas as Chris
- Ted Nugent as Himself
- Monty Hall as Himself
- Leslie Baker as Janitor

== Episodes ==
No. overall	No. in season	Title	Directed by	Written by	Original release date	Prod. code	Viewers (millions)
52	1	"Reefer Madness"	David Trainer	Joshua Sternin & Jeffrey Ventimilia	October 3, 2000	301	11.92
When Red learns what Hyde is in jail for marijuana, he thinks about kicking Hyde out of the house. To keep that from happening, Eric decides to tell Red about his marijuana use, much to the gang's protest. Meanwhile, Jackie becomes infatuated with Hyde, even if he doesn't love her back. At the end of the episode, Red decides to forgive Hyde and let him stay, however Eric reveals the truth to his father before anyone can stop him. Note: Reefer Madness is also the title of a 1936 anti-marijuana exploitation film.
53	2	"Red Sees Red"	David Trainer	Linda Wallem	October 10, 2000	302	11.80
Red puts the Forman house under a strict curfew after Eric reveals his marijuana use, booby-trapping the house in the process. Laurie is initially happy about Eric's situation, until she discovers that she is under the curfew as well, while Kitty does everything to make Red change his mind. Eventually, Red goes a step too far, and Kitty finally snaps at him, demanding Red to forgive and forget the entire situation, which he eventually does.
54	3	"Hyde's Father"	David Trainer	John Schwab	October 17, 2000	304	10.41
Hyde's father, Bud (Robert Hays), returns to Point Place, wanting but Hyde to come live with him. However, Hyde is reluctant to make amends, while Kitty tries to get them to reconcile. Red also doesn't think it's a good idea for Hyde to move back in with Bud, knowing Bud's history. Meanwhile, Donna becomes angry at Eric after discovering a stash of Playpen (a parody of Playboy) magazines under his bed.
55	4	"Too Old to Trick or Treat, Too Young to Die"	David Trainer	Jeff Filgo & Jackie Filgo	October 31, 2000	303	8.80
The gang share a strange Halloween, complete with comic spoofs of several Alfred Hitchcock movies, including Psycho, The Birds, Rear Window, Vertigo, and North by Northwest. Eric develops vertigo after falling off the garage roof, Fez and Hyde spy on the Pinciottis, thinking Bob killed Midge, while Donna wants to prove to Eric that she is not boring. Meanwhile, Kitty and Laurie have a hard time feeding a neighbor's birds and a paperboy whom Red forgot to pay mistakes Kelso for someone in the Forman family and vigorously stalks him. Note: This episode was banned from Nick at Nite airings, though it did air at least 3 times in October 2011.
56	5	"Roller Disco"	David Trainer	Mark Hudis	November 14, 2000	305	9.97
Jackie and Fez compete together in a roller disco, which could prove useful for Fez towards winning her heart. Meanwhile, Red gets sued by his former Price Mart employee, Earl, for wrongful termination.
57	6	"Eric's Panties"	David Trainer	Dean Batali & Rob Deshotel	November 21, 2000	307	11.10
Donna suspects Eric is cheating on her after she finds a pair of panties in the Vista Cruiser. Meanwhile, Kitty is concerned with Red's high blood pressure and puts him on a less than satisfactory diet. Eventually, it's revealed that the panties Donna found actually belong to Midge, as they were left there after she and Bob had sex in the Vista Cruiser.
58	7	"Baby Fever"	David Trainer	Kristin Newman	November 28, 2000	306	11.59
Kitty wants to have another child after taking care of a neighbor's baby, much to Red's horror. Meanwhile, Donna is not pleased with Eric's vision of their future that sees her as a housewife, and Kelso demands payment from Jackie after she crashes his van. However, when Hyde attempts to "help", it turns out that Kelso owes Jackie more than she owes him.
59	8	"Jackie Bags Hyde"	David Trainer	Dave Schiff	December 12, 2000	308	11.62
It's Veterans Day and Bob throws a Veterans Day barbecue party, which Red usually does every year, fueling a rivalry between the neighbors, until Donna reveals that Bob's party is Bob's way of coping with the fact that his store, "Bargain Bob's" is closing. Meanwhile, Hyde (with the urging of Kitty) finally realizes he likes Jackie enough to ask her out on a date.
60	9	"Hyde's Christmas Rager"	David Trainer	Mark Hudis	December 19, 2000	311	11.92
Red and Kitty try to set Bud straight about parenting after Eric gets drunk during a Christmas party at Hyde's apartment. Meanwhile, Jackie takes Donna out so they can meet older men.
61	10	"Ice Shack"	David Trainer	Philip Stark	January 9, 2001	309	13.16
Kelso takes Eric, Donna, Jackie and Fez to an ice shack where he intends to win Jackie back once and for all. While at the ice shack, Eric and Donna compete with Jackie and Kelso to see who is the better couple, leading to disastrous results for Kelso. Meanwhile, Leo asks Hyde to get something for him, which could potentially land Hyde in jail again, and Red confronts Laurie as to what she plans to do with her life.
62	11	"Who Wants It More?"	David Trainer	Joshua Sternin & Jeffrey Ventimilia	January 10, 2001	314	11.67
Eric and Donna stop having sex after arguing over a school assignment, leading to both going through their own withdrawals. Meanwhile, Kelso convinces Hyde, Fez and Leo to go UFO hunting with him, while a near-death experience enlightens Red on the idea of friendship.
63	12	"Fez Gets The Girl"	David Trainer	Chris Peterson & Bryan Moore	January 16, 2001	310	12.59
Fez becomes attracted to a new transfer student, Caroline (Allison Munn). Meanwhile. Donna scores two tickets to a Led Zeppelin concert, but doesn't know who to take, so she gives one ticket to Caroline and the other ticket to Fez much to their delight. Eric becomes Price Mart's "Employee of the Month", and the accolade goes to his head. Meanwhile, Red is concerned Eric will put off a college education and Kitty becomes Laurie's model for a cosmetic assignment at beauty school. Note: This is the last appearance of Lisa Robin Kelly (Laurie Forman) as a series regular.
64	13	"Dine and Dash"	David Trainer	Jackie Filgo & Jeff Filgo	January 30, 2001	312	12.93
Kelso takes the gang out to dinner, but reveals he has no intention of paying, leading to chaos. Kitty thinks Red should offer a now-unemployed Bob a job at Price Mart.
65	14	"Radio Daze"	David Trainer	Dave Schiff	February 6, 2001	315	11.89
Donna lands an intern job at a local radio station, leading Eric to feel like she's spending more time there than with him. Meanwhile, Kelso wants to buy Leo's El Camino, and Red feels guilty after a Fatso Burger employee he's familiar with is fired over a complaint he makes.
66	15	"Donna's Panties"	David Trainer	Dean Batali & Rob Deshotel	February 13, 2001	313	12.42
Eric pulls down Donna's pants in front of everyone during a game of basketball, exposing her "granny panties" and Eric must deal with the repercussions. Valentine's Day occurs and Kelso discovers Laurie sleeping with another man, effectively ending their relationship. Meanwhile, Fez begins to notice some odd behavior towards him from Caroline.
67	16	"Romantic Weekend"	David Trainer	Jackie Filgo & Jeff Filgo	February 20, 2001	316	12.15
Eric and Donna go away for a romantic weekend at a hotel, but find Red and Kitty in the next room, putting everyone's plans on hold. Back at home, when Kelso underperforms during a makeout session with another girl, he fears for his waning libido - leading to extreme ridicule from everyone else.
68	17	"Kitty's Birthday (Is That Today?!)"	David Trainer	Bryan Moore & Chris Peterson	February 27, 2001	317	10.08
Eric and Red forget Kitty's birthday and the two must make up by doing something she's wanted to do for a long time - square dancing. Meanwhile, Kelso decides to be Jackie's "boy-friend", and Hyde finds Caroline's obsession with Fez more than a little disturbing.
69	18	"The Trials of Michael Kelso"	David Trainer	Philip Stark	March 13, 2001	318	10.75
Jackie tests Kelso to see if they should get back together, while Eric and Hyde help Fez take revenge on a rival school for bullying him. Meanwhile, Red and Kitty are curious as to why Bob and Midge didn't invite them to a party. In the end, Kelso and Jackie eventually get back together.
70	19	"Eric's Naughty No-No"	David Trainer	Kristin Newman	March 27, 2001	319	11.21
Eric tries a move he sees in a dirty movie on Donna, much to Donna's horror and discomfort. Kelso decides to tell Jackie all the lies and secrets he has kept from her, with Hyde's assistance. Meanwhile, Kitty's younger sister, Paula (Valerie Harper), comes for a visit, under false pretenses.
71	20	"Holy Craps!"	David Trainer	Mark Hudis	April 17, 2001	320	10.11
Kitty makes everyone help her at a church fundraiser, but not according to the way she wants. A churchgoer (John Ratzenberger) warns Eric about his future with Donna, and Fez must decide whether he should stay with an overly-obsessed Caroline.
72	21	"Fez Dates Donna"	David Trainer	Dean Batali & Rob Deshotel	May 1, 2001	321	9.54
After breaking up with Caroline, Fez pretends to date Donna as a ruse to avoid her, while Eric and Hyde start a money pool to see when Kelso and Jackie will break up again, much to Donna's annoyance. Meanwhile, after looking at his property deed, Bob believes he owns part of the Foremans' property, which frustrates Red.
73	22	"Eric's Drunken Tattoo"	David Trainer	Jeffrey Ventimilia & Joshua Sternin	May 1, 2001	322	11.02
Eric reads Donna's diary and decides to get a tattoo, believing he's not dangerous enough for her. Meanwhile, Kelso talks in his sleep, fueling Jackie's curiosity, and Red spends a day with Pastor Dave when Red's band-aid accidentally gets on Pastor Dave's food. Note: This is the first episode of the series to take place in 1978.
74	23	"Canadian Road Trip"	David Trainer	Dave Schiff	May 8, 2001	324	8.97
The guys and Leo go to Canada for beer, but are forced to smuggle Fez when he doesn't have his green card, leading to then being detained by the Canadian Mounted Police. Meanwhile, Donna believes Jackie is being set up by a false modeling agency and Red tests out a recently bought Betamax recorder. Goof: The map of Canada seen in the background shows Nunavut Territory. Nunavut was not created until 1999. The mileage sign shown behind the Vista Cruiser, the city of Winnipeg is misspelt as Winnepeg.
75	24	"Backstage Pass"	David Trainer	Philip Stark	May 15, 2001	323	10.22
Donna ditches Eric backstage at a Ted Nugent concert and Kelso delivers a romantic, love-filled day for Jackie, while Red and Kitty can't recall their first meeting with one another.
76	25	"The Promise Ring"	David Trainer	Jeff Filgo & Jackie Filgo	May 22, 2001	325	10.56
Eric gives Donna a promise ring as a sign they will be together forever. However, Donna is unsure if she's ready for such a commitment and questions their future together. In the end, Donna reluctantly decides to give Eric the ring back, and they officially break up. Note: This is the last appearance of Tanya Roberts (Midge Pinciotti) as a series regular.
