= That '70s Show season 2 =

That '70s Show
- Season 2
- DVD cover
- Starring: Topher Grace; Mila Kunis; Ashton Kutcher; Danny Masterson; Laura Prepon; Wilmer Valderrama; Debra Jo Rupp; Kurtwood Smith; Tanya Roberts; Don Stark; Lisa Robin Kelly
- No. of episodes: 26

Release
- Original network: Fox
- Original release: September 28, 1999 – May 22, 2000

Season chronology
- ← Previous; Season 1 Next → Season 3

The second season of That '70s Show, an American television series, aired on Fox from September 28, 1999, to May 22, 2000. The region 1 DVD was released on April 19, 2005. This season is set entirely in the year 1977.

There are many central storylines for this season. Eric and Donna's love for each other continues to grow as they slowly phase sex into their relationship. Red's auto plant has closed, beginning his quest for a new job. Kitty continues babying Eric and is dismayed when she learns just how much he has grown up. Hyde has moved in with the Formans after his mother leaves town, and gets a job working for local hippie Leo. Kelso is still dating Jackie, but also begins an affair with Eric's sister Laurie behind her back. Fez becomes determined to find a girl and lose his virginity. Donna deals with Bob and Midge fighting and eventually separating, leading to her acting out to try to get their attention.

== Cast ==
=== Main ===
- Topher Grace as Eric Forman
- Mila Kunis as Jackie Burkhart
- Ashton Kutcher as Michael Kelso
- Danny Masterson as Steven Hyde
- Laura Prepon as Donna Pinciotti
- Wilmer Valderrama as Fez
- Debra Jo Rupp as Kitty Forman
- Kurtwood Smith as Red Forman
- Tanya Roberts as Midge Pinciotti
- Don Stark as Bob Pinciotti
- Lisa Robin Kelly as Laurie Forman

=== Special appearance ===
- Paul Anka as himself
- Lyle Waggoner as himself
- Bob Eubanks as himself

=== Special guest ===
- Marion Ross as Bernice Forman
- Tommy Chong as Leo
- Melissa Joan Hart as Mary

=== Recurring ===
- Paul Connor as Timmy Thompson

=== Guest ===
- Neil Flynn as the Bouncer
- Stephen Tobolowsky as The Professor
- Lindsay Sloane as Patty
- Jenilee Harrison as Carol
- Richard Kline as Ted
- Amy Adams as Kat Peterson
- Maud Adams as Holly
- Kristina Wayborn as Honor
- Barbara Carrera as Barbara
- Kevin McDonald as Pastor Dave Rogers
- Mac Davis as St. Peter

== Episodes ==
No. overall	No. in season	Title	Directed by	Written by	Original release date	Prod. code	Viewers (millions)
26	1	"Garage Sale"	David Trainer	Dave Schiff	September 28, 1999	204	11.25
With the plant's closure on the horizon and Red on the verge of unemployment, the Foremans decide to hold a garage sale to raise money. Looking for a way to contribute, Hyde makes "special brownies" to sell at the garage sale, much to Eric's distress. However, things don't go the way Hyde intends when Red, Kitty, Bob and Midge eat all the brownies. A stoned Red then accidentally sells Eric's Vista Cruiser, leading he, Eric and Hyde on a quest to get it back. Meanwhile, Fez kisses Jackie, which only earns him a punch in the face from Kelso.
27	2	"Red's Last Day"	David Trainer	Mark Brazill	October 5, 1999	201	8.82
On his last day of work at the plant, a depressed Red gets drunk with his co-workers at a bar. When Eric, Hyde and Fez go to collect him, they all get drunk as well. Meanwhile, Kelso gets a free van from his uncle and Laurie starts to get a little amorous with him, while Jackie and Donna talk about sex.
28	3	"The Velvet Rope"	David Trainer	Joshua Sternin & Jeffrey Ventimilia	October 12, 1999	202	10.46
Tired of her parents' odd behavior, Donna forces Eric, Hyde and Fez to take her to a dance club in Chicago. Initially, only Donna is let in, forcing the guys to think of their own ways to get in. Meanwhile, Kelso gets a makeover from Jackie, and Red starts looking for other jobs in town, but hits a snag when he finds his former co-workers from the plant are after the same job he discovers.
29	4	"Laurie and the Professor"	David Trainer	Linda Wallem	October 19, 1999	203	8.77
One of Laurie's college professors (Stephen Tobolowsky), arrives at the Foreman home, under the false pretense of convincing Laurie to return to her classes. However, Eric soon discovers his real reason for being at the Forman house when he catches Laurie kissing her professor, and attempts to blackmail his sister with this information. Meanwhile, tired of bunking with Eric, Hyde begins searching for a suitable place to sleep around the Foreman home, and Donna is at the center of her parents' fighting, as they each attempt to win her favor by taking her shopping.
30	5	"Halloween"	David Trainer	Joshua Sternin & Jeffrey Ventimilia	October 26, 1999	208	8.95
The gang is at odds with each other after finding their old permanent records on Halloween night at their old, burned down elementary school, where many secrets are soon revealed. These include: that Donna used to streak; Kelso had to repeat the first grade; Jackie's middle name is Beulah; Eric was responsible for the first time Hyde got in trouble; the time Hyde kissed Donna; and Jackie saying that Fez was a better kisser than Kelso. Meanwhile, Red and Kitty reminisce about their first Halloween at Point Place.
31	6	"Vanstock"	David Trainer	Arthur F. Montmorency	November 2, 1999	210	9.08
The gang heads off to "Vanstock" and Laurie tags along. However, Hyde convinces Jackie to come along as well to "surprise" Kelso. In reality, Hyde sets out to make Kelso's life miserable, due to Kelso actively cheating on Jackie with Laurie. Meanwhile, Donna is upset with Eric for not telling her about Kelso and Laurie, while Jackie and Laurie actually become good friends, much to Kelso's dismay. Back at home, Red begins to watch soap operas under Midge's influence.
32	7	"I Love Cake"	David Trainer	Jeff Filgo & Jackie Filgo	November 9, 1999	205	7.83
After Donna says "I love you", a stunned Eric responds by simply saying "I love cake". Eric then becomes confused with how he should return his feelings towards Donna. Meanwhile, Jackie buys Kelso a leather jacket which makes him resemble Fonzie, and Bob is kicked out of the Pinciotti house by Midge. Bob moves in with the Formans, much to Red and Kitty's dismay, forcing Red to come up with a plan to get Bob back into his own home.
33	8	"Sleepover"	David Trainer	Dean Batali & Rob DesHotel	November 16, 1999	207	9.58
Eric and Donna sleep together in Eric's bed, but don't have sex. This prompts many jokes from the guys, convincing Eric he must do it the next time. Meanwhile, seeing that money is tight in the Forman home, Hyde goes out to find a job at a photo-developing store, where the hippie Leo (Tommy Chong) is introduced.
34	9	"Eric Gets Suspended"	David Trainer	Philip Stark	November 30, 1999	209	8.43
Eric gets suspended from school after getting caught holding Donna's cigarette; as punishment, Red makes him smoke a whole pack. Meanwhile, Jackie is upset because Kelso won't let her decorate his van, and Hyde and Fez go on a double blind date.
35	10	"Red's Birthday"	David Trainer	Mark Hudis	December 7, 1999	206	8.48
Red's birthday turns sour when Bob and Midge show up for dinner, but with their own dates. Meanwhile, Eric thinks Donna doesn't confide in him as much as she does the others, while Jackie suspects Kelso is keeping something from her.
36	11	"Laurie Moves Out"	David Trainer	John Schwab	December 14, 1999	211	8.43
Laurie moves out of the house and lies to Red about living with another man. Meanwhile, Jackie's suspicion with Kelso cheating on her grows, prompting Kelso to ask Hyde for advice on how to cover his tracks.
37	12	"Eric's Stash"	David Trainer	Chris Peterson	January 11, 2000	213	9.01
Eric wants to buy an anniversary present for Donna, but discovers his secret stash of money has been stolen. Eric eventually begins to believe that Hyde is the culprit, leading to a strain on their friendship. Meanwhile, Jackie enters a beauty pageant with Kelso as her "pageant boy".
38	13	"Hunting"	David Trainer	Mark Brazill	January 18, 2000	212	9.37
The guys and husbands go deer hunting, while the girls and wives stay at home and play poker, which Laurie cheats at so Kitty can win. Meanwhile, Fez kills a crow, which is then eaten by he, Bob, Hyde, and Kelso, and Red has a heart-to-heart talk over his angry behavior with Eric.
39	14	"Red's New Job"	David Trainer	Jeff Filgo & Jackie Filgo	February 1, 2000	215	8.72
A new department store, Price Mart, is opening in Point Place and Red seeks a managerial position, until Eric is hired as a stock boy first, much to Red's annoyance. Meanwhile, Laurie wants a real relationship with Kelso, and Kelso is unsure if he should continue dating her. He tries to end it, until Laurie threatens him with revealing his infidelity to Jackie.
40	15	"Burning Down the House"	David Trainer	Dave Schiff	February 7, 2000	216	8.94
Jackie wants to throw a small, classy party at her home, but Kelso ruins it by inviting everyone from school. Things get even worse when Kelso accidentally sets Jackie's house on fire. Meanwhile, Eric tries not to be so uptight in order to impress Donna, and Red discovers Bob's secret that he wears a toupee.
41	16	"The First Time"	David Trainer	Mark Hudis	February 14, 2000	217	9.30
Bob and Midge plan to have a second wedding, intending for Donna to write their vows, but Donna doesn't know how to put them into words. Meanwhile, Kitty is upset at not being one of Midge's bridesmaids, while Kelso proves to Jackie he isn't as clueless about the two of them as she thinks he is. On the day of the wedding, Donna and Eric decide to have sex for the first time. Maud Adams guest-stars, appearing as a bridesmaid to Tanya Roberts (portraying Midge), along with Kristina Wayborn (her Octopussy co-star) and Barbara Carrera; all four share the title of Bond girl.
42	17	"Afterglow"	David Trainer	Joshua Sternin & Jeffrey Ventimilia	February 21, 2000	218	10.00
After Eric and Donna have sex for the first time, Eric is dismayed to discover he was "awkward and weird." Meanwhile, Red gets his first paycheck from Price Mart and celebrates by purchasing a motorcycle, which Kitty objects to—at first.
43	18	"Kitty and Eric's Night Out"	David Trainer	Linda Wallem	February 28, 2000	214	9.44
Red tells Eric to go out with Kitty so they can spend some quality time together, while Hyde is confused as to why a girl from a previous blind date is now going out with Fez. Meanwhile, Donna notices a stirring jealously from Jackie towards Fez's new girl.
44	19	"Parents Find Out"	David Trainer	Mark Hudis	March 7, 2000	222	9.03
Eric and Donna are caught having sex in the back of the Vista Cruiser by the police, which, of course, leads their parents to find out. This leads Kitty to becomes depressed and bedridden, as she cannot cope with the fact that Eric is growing up. Meanwhile, Kelso installs a new CB radio in his van, leading to he, Hyde and Fez meeting some women.
45	20	"Kiss of Death"	David Trainer	Rob des Hotel & Dean Batali	March 20, 2000	219	11.91
Kelso finally decides to break up with Laurie, but after she requests a goodbye kiss, Jackie catches them in the act and breaks up with Kelso. Meanwhile, Eric inadvertently runs over Donna's cat, Mr. Bonkers, and Fez is sent to the hospital after experiencing sharp, stabbing pains in his abdomen.
46	21	"Kelso's Serenade"	David Trainer	Linda Wallem	March 27, 2000	220	11.78
Kelso wants to win Jackie back by writing her a song, while Jackie surprisingly turns to Hyde for comfort. Meanwhile, Red, Kitty and Laurie spend the weekend with their bitter Aunt Pearl (Connie Sawyer), and Eric and Donna experience communication problems.
47	22	"Jackie Moves On"	David Trainer	Philip Stark	April 3, 2000	221	8.75
Fez finally asks Jackie out for a date, but it doesn't go as he plans. Meanwhile, Eric and Laurie's sibling rivalry heats up as embarrassing secrets about one another are revealed, and Red is upset when Kitty reveals she pawned his mother's necklace to buy groceries.
48	23	"Holy Crap!"	David Trainer	Rob des Hotel & Dean Batali	May 1, 2000	223	8.56
Eric and Laurie quit going to church, which worries Kitty, who decides to invite their pastor over in an attempt to change their minds. Meanwhile, Jackie becomes attracted to Kelso when he starts growing a beard—which the rest of the gang ridicule.
49	24	"Red Fired Up"	David Trainer	Dave Schiff	May 8, 2000	224	9.56
Red redirects his anger away from Eric onto Earl (Robert Clendenin), one of his slacker employees at Price Mart. This makes Eric happy until Red fires Earl, leaving Eric to question his father's work attitude. Meanwhile, Kelso begins dating Laurie again and the gang isn't too happy with his choice.
50	25	"Cat Fight Club"	David Trainer	Philip Stark	May 15, 2000	225	8.40
Hyde teaches Jackie to be Zen when Laurie insults her, leading to Jackie developing feelings for Hyde. Meanwhile, Red finally finds out that Kelso is dating Laurie and decides to set him straight.
51	26	"Moon Over Point Place"	David Trainer	Jeff Filgo & Jackie Filgo	May 22, 2000	226	8.09
Eric is jealous when a picture of Donna mooning the camera appears in the yearbook. Bob is still uneasy knowing Eric is sleeping with Donna, and Jackie's constant affection for Hyde annoys him to no end. Eventually, when Jackie is busted by the police with marijuana, Hyde takes the blame for her, landing him in jail.
