= That '70s Show season 7 =

That '70s Show
- Season 7
- DVD cover
- Starring: Topher Grace; Mila Kunis; Ashton Kutcher; Danny Masterson; Laura Prepon; Wilmer Valderrama; Debra Jo Rupp; Kurtwood Smith; Don Stark
- No. of episodes: 25

Release
- Original network: Fox
- Original release: September 8, 2004 – May 18, 2005

Season chronology
- ← Previous; Season 6 Next → Season 8

The seventh season of That '70s Show, an American television series, aired on Fox from September 8, 2004, to May 18, 2005. The region 1 DVD was released on October 16, 2007. This season is set entirely in 1979.

This is the last season to feature Topher Grace and Ashton Kutcher as regulars. Grace left the show at the end of the season to star in Spider-Man 3, and Kutcher to star in The Guardian. However, Kutcher appeared five times in the next season as a "Special Guest Star", and Grace made an uncredited cameo in the series finale.

All episodes are named after songs by The Rolling Stones.

Although their wedding doesn't happen, Eric and Donna stay together, trying to figure out what to do with their lives. After falling off the water tower, Hyde learns from Kitty who his actual father is, and through him starts a new career. He begins to face pressure to marry Jackie, which he is unsure about. Kelso is now a father and a cop, but neither stops him from wreaking havoc in Point Place. Fez is loving his new job and begins slowly fulfilling his dream of being a ladies man. Red finally goes back to work, opening his own muffler shop.

== Cast ==
=== Main ===
- Topher Grace as Eric Forman
- Mila Kunis as Jackie Burkhart
- Ashton Kutcher as Michael Kelso
- Danny Masterson as Steven Hyde
- Laura Prepon as Donna Pinciotti
- Wilmer Valderrama as Fez
- Debra Jo Rupp as Kitty Forman
- Kurtwood Smith as Red Forman
- Don Stark as Bob Pinciotti

=== Special guest ===
- Shannon Elizabeth as Brooke Rockwell
- Luke Wilson as Casey
- Tim Reid as William Barnett
- Lindsay Lohan as Danielle
- Eliza Dushku as Sarah
- Tommy Chong as Leo
- Chris Elliott as Mr. Bray

=== Special guest appearance ===
- Tanya Roberts as Midge Pinciotti

=== Special appearance ===
- Brooke Shields as Pamela Burkhart

=== Recurring ===
- Jim Rash as Fenton
- Megalyn Echikunwoke as Angie Barnett
- Bret Harrison as Charlie

=== Guest ===
- Jack Riley as Old Man Shinsky
- Carolyn Hennesy as Patty Ryals
- Jenna Fischer as Stacy Wanamaker
- Jimmy Pardo as Stan

== Episodes ==
No. overall	No. in season	Title	Directed by	Written by	Original release date	Prod. code	Viewers (millions)
154	1	"Time Is on My Side"	David Trainer	Jeff Filgo & Jackie Filgo	September 8, 2004	701	7.85
Eric and Donna decide to stay together after the wedding fiasco, but he is unsure how to proceed with his life. Once Eric understands what he wants to do, the gang helps him finance his plans. Midge and Pam continue to bicker for Bob's affection, and Red forces him to make the right choice, which Red and Kitty disagree upon.
155	2	"Let's Spend the Night Together"	David Trainer	Dean Batali	September 15, 2004	702	6.61
Hyde finally meets his biological father, William Barnett, and is surprised at his race. Eric goes with Donna to a feminist rally and Kelso is expecting the birth of his baby.
156	3	"(I Can't Get No) Satisfaction"	David Trainer	Kristin Newman	September 22, 2004	703	5.64
Eric vandalizes a muffler shop, which Red later buys, and Kelso believes being a single parent to his new baby daughter, Betsy, could serve to his advantage in dating women, or so he thinks.
157	4	"Beast of Burden"	David Trainer	Dave Schiff	September 29, 2004	704	6.43
Eric is upset when Red hires Hyde instead of him to work at his new muffler shop, "Forman & Son." William offers Hyde a job, too, which conflicts with Hyde's choices, and Fez becomes a shampoo boy at a local salon. Tanya Roberts appears as Midge.
158	5	"It's Only Rock and Roll"	David Trainer	Philip Stark	October 6, 2004	705	6.27
Hyde starts working at his father's record store chain and Kitty starts doing tai chi to calm her nerves. After Kelso gives away his Playboy magazines, Fez delves too deeply into its material.
159	6	"Rip This Joint"	David Trainer	Rob Des Hotel	November 3, 2004	706	6.25
Eric goes to jail after he is caught pranking a neighbor's yard. Meanwhile, Kitty throws a party at the Forman house, and Midge locks herself in Red's bathroom, after Bob throws a jealous fuss over her and William.
160	7	"Mother's Little Helper"	David Trainer	Mark Hudis	November 10, 2004	710	7.00
Kitty stops making meals until Red reads The Joy Of Sex and decides how to proceed with their sex life. One of Fez's customers at the salon, Danielle (Lindsay Lohan), stands up her date and goes out with Fez, while Kelso asks Fez for advice on women.
161	8	"Angie"	David Trainer	Chris Peterson & Bryan Moore	November 17, 2004	707	6.66
The gang meets Hyde's half-sister, Angie, who wants nothing more than to see him out of their father's record company. Eric begins taking Spanish lessons, but it is just a cover for something he loves to do, which shocks the entire gang including Red.
162	9	"You Can't Always Get What You Want"	David Trainer	Gregg Mettler	November 24, 2004	708	6.45
Eric wants to go to a Styx concert on Thanksgiving, but his parents want him to stay for dinner. Hyde and Angie open up a new record store for their father called "Grooves", but plans for its grand opening aren't going as well as they seem.
163	10	"Surprise, Surprise"	David Trainer	Sarah McLaughlin	December 1, 2004	709	6.15
Hyde is not pleased when Angie reveals she slept with Kelso, and must bear the laughter thrown at him. Eric doesn't understand how Donna compares him to a "twizzler", and Kitty helps Jackie bake something for Hyde, in order to cheer him up.
164	11	"Winter"	David Trainer	Dean Batali	December 15, 2004	711	6.17
The guys take all the toys intended for the Christmas Toy Drive and play around with them first before returning it. Kitty meets an old acquaintance at the Toy Drive, and Jackie wonders if Hyde will grow up from his childish antics.
165	12	"Don't Lie to Me"	David Trainer	Kristin Newman	January 5, 2005	712	6.24
Concerned about her future with Hyde, Jackie pretends to be engaged to Fez during a wedding reception for one of their former high school seniors' sister (Jenna Fischer), which could prove to be troublesome in Hyde and Jackie's relationship. At the same time, the gang tells Angie why she should break up with Kelso, only to have him admit genuine affection for her after the breakup.
166	13	"Can't You Hear Me Knocking"	David Trainer	Rob Des Hotel	January 12, 2005	713	6.27
When Kelso accidentally threatens President Jimmy Carter, the guys go paranoid, believing the authorities are out to get them, and try desperately to get rid of everything illegal in the Forman house. Red goes ice fishing with Kitty, and Donna takes Jackie to her karate class, where Jackie sorts out her feelings behind the breakup with Hyde.
167	14	"Street Fighting Man"	David Trainer	Alan Dybner	February 9, 2005	714	8.87
Donna scores tickets to a Green Bay Packers home game at Lambeau Field, and while Hyde, Kelso and Fez figure out how to get the three of them into the game with two tickets, Jackie continues to mope over her breakup. At the game, Eric accidentally dons a Chicago Bears jersey, which lands him in trouble with Packers fans, but this ends up improving Eric and Red's relationship when they defend each other against the angry mob.
168	15	"It's All Over Now"	David Trainer	Mark Hudis	February 16, 2005	715	8.58
A new intern at Donna's radio station, Sarah (Eliza Dushku), gets her fired for not showing off her body during a public taping at Grooves, as Tom Jones is scheduled to arrive there. With Eric's help, Donna gets revenge on both Sarah and her sexist boss. Kitty wants Red to get Tom Jones' autograph, while Jackie turns to Fez for advice on how to get Hyde back.
169	16	"On with the Show"	David Trainer	Dave Schiff	February 23, 2005	716	8.27
Jackie prepares to host her own public television show, but gets stage fright, and Angie wants to know how she can deliver a "burn". Meanwhile, Hyde believes Jackie wants to get back together with him and Eric meets someone with his likes and hobbies, but whose life makes him think about his own future.
170	17	"Down the Road Apiece"	David Trainer	Philip Stark	March 2, 2005	717	7.54
Eric leaves Point Place to make a documentary film about life on the road, and bumps into the gang's old friend Leo (Tommy Chong) when his car breaks down. Jackie and Hyde try to patch their damaged relationship with Fez as their coach.
171	18	"Oh, Baby (We Got a Good Thing Goin')"	David Trainer	Gregg Mettler	March 16, 2005	718	7.47
While watching Betsy, Kelso has trouble babysitting and ends up losing her at Eric's house. Hyde, Jackie, Red and Kitty go to a car show.
172	19	"Who's Been Sleeping Here?"	David Trainer	David Spancer	March 23, 2005	719	8.26
Kelso wants Hyde and Jackie to be Betsy's godparents, which doesn't sit well with Eric and Donna, who think the honor should be theirs. Angie discovers someone is using Grooves as a residence, and the gang is surprised to find out Fez is the culprit.
173	20	"Gimme Shelter"	David Trainer	Chris Peterson & Bryan Moore	March 30, 2005	720	7.25
After Jackie graduates high school, Eric finds out he is the only one without a future and starts considering various job options and enrolls in a chiropractor seminar, but doesn't think it's a good option when he mishandles one of the gang when practicing. Elsewhere, Kelso and Fez find the perfect apartment to live in, but the landlord, Fenton, who has some beef with Fez, prevents them from renting it out.
174	21	"2120 So. Michigan Ave"	David Trainer	Dean Batali	April 27, 2005	721	7.09
Eric chooses to become a teacher, but receives an "incomplete" in gym class, thus preventing him from graduating high school. He must re-take it over the summer, but Casey Kelso might prevent him from doing so. Kelso and Fez bicker over the choice of rooms at their new apartment, and must face off in a beauty pageant-like competition.
175	22	"2000 Light Years from Home"	David Trainer	Kristin Newman	May 4, 2005	722	6.61
Eric, having Red spend his savings on his muffler shop, needs to find money for his college tuition and turns to his former high school guidance counselor, who offers him an odd choice, which could anger his friends and family. Kelso tries to break up with Angie, only to have her beat him to it when she is promoted to her father's corporate office in Milwaukee.
176	23	"Take It or Leave It"	David Trainer	Gregg Mettler	May 11, 2005	723	6.33
Jackie is offered a job in Chicago for her television show, but will only go if Hyde doesn't live up to her expectations to propose. Donna tries to prevent Eric from going to Africa by faking a date and Charlie, the son of one of Red's war buddies, visits the gang and offers the guys solace in a place beyond their wildest dreams.
177	24	"Short and Curlies"	David Trainer	Rob Des Hotel	May 18, 2005	724	8.77
Jackie prepares to leave for Chicago, unless Hyde has something to say that will make her think twice. Charlie wants to apologize to Red for his earlier behavior, but keeps getting into uncomfortable situations with Kitty. Donna has trouble finding a parting gift for Eric, and turns to Kitty for help.
178	25	"Till the Next Goodbye" (Note: This is the last episode to feature Topher Grace and Ashton Kutcher as main cast members. Kutcher guest stars in five episodes of Season 8, which includes the finale, while Grace briefly appears in the last episode, but remains uncredited.)	David Trainer	Mark Hudis	May 18, 2005	725	8.77
The boys gather for one last "circle" before Eric leaves, until Red finally catches them. Eric goes to take his shots. With a heart-warming farewell from his friends and family, Eric heads to Africa. Hyde finds Jackie and Kelso in a motel room in Chicago after wanting to prove his love for Jackie.
