= That '70s Show season 4 =

That '70s Show
- Season 4
- DVD cover
- Starring: Topher Grace; Mila Kunis; Ashton Kutcher; Danny Masterson; Laura Prepon; Wilmer Valderrama; Debra Jo Rupp; Kurtwood Smith; Don Stark; Tommy Chong
- No. of episodes: 27

Release
- Original network: Fox
- Original release: September 25, 2001 – May 21, 2002

Season chronology
- ← Previous; Season 3 Next → Season 5

The fourth season of That '70s Show, an American television series, aired on Fox from September 25, 2001, to May 21, 2002. The region 1 DVD was released on May 9, 2006. This season is set entirely in 1978.

The central storyline for this season revolves around Eric and Donna's relationship ending, and the ensuing fallout their breakup creates. Donna's parents have now divorced and her father Bob is depressed. Kelso and Jackie are back together, but their relationship sees new challenges for both. Hyde returns to living with the Formans when Bud reunites with his mother and leaves him, again. Fez begins dating Big Rhonda and believes he will lose his virginity to her. At the end of the season, two members of the gang decide the only way to cope with their problems is by leaving Point Place.

== Cast ==
=== Main ===
- Topher Grace as Eric Forman
- Mila Kunis as Jackie Burkhart
- Ashton Kutcher as Michael Kelso
- Danny Masterson as Steven Hyde
- Laura Prepon as Donna Pinciotti
- Wilmer Valderrama as Fez
- Debra Jo Rupp as Kitty Forman
- Kurtwood Smith as Red Forman
- Don Stark as Bob Pinciotti
- Tommy Chong as Leo

=== Special guest ===
- Wayne Knight as Angel
- French Stewart as Daniel
- Luke Wilson as Casey Kelso
- Christopher Masterson as Todd
- Roger Daltrey as Mr. Wilkinson

=== Special guest appearance ===
- Howard Hesseman as Max

=== Recurring ===
- Cynthia Lamontagne as Rhonda
- Mo Gaffney as Joanne
- Kevin McDonald as Pastor Dave

=== Guest ===
- Jennifer Lyons as Pam Macy
- Tom Kenny as Woofy the Dog
- Dylan Sprouse as Billy
- Cole Sprouse as Bobby
- Reagan Gomez-Preston as Melissa
- Richard Karn as Theo
- Erika Christensen as Stacey
- Brittany Daniel as Penny Sigurdson
- Timothy Bottoms as Vice Principal Cole
- Pamela Sue Martin as Wizard

=== Special appearance ===
- Lynsey Bartilson as Lynsey
- China Chow as China
- Colleen Haskell as Colleen
- Carnie Wilson as Carnie

== Episodes ==
No. overall	No. in season	Title	Directed by	Written by	Original release date	Prod. code	Viewers (millions)
77	1	"It's a Wonderful Life"	David Trainer	Linda Wallem	September 25, 2001	401	10.35
After breaking up with Donna, a depressed and heartbroken Eric wishes he and Donna never kissed and, à la It's a Wonderful Life, an angel (Wayne Knight) gives Eric a glimpse at what he and his friends' lives would have been, spanning from 1976 (the pilot episode) to the 1980s. Cynthia Lamontagne makes her first of six appearances as "Big Rhonda."
78	2	"Eric's Depression"	David Trainer	Bryan Moore & Chris Peterson	September 26, 2001	402	8.23
A still-depressed and severely heartbroken Eric stays in his room, prompting Red to find a way to help his son back on his feet. Meanwhile, Kelso gets lost during a trip to Funland amusement park with Hyde, Jackie and Fez.
79	3	"Pinciotti vs. Forman"	David Trainer	Kristin Newman	October 2, 2001	403	9.71
After Eric refuses to allow Donna into his basement, a rivalry ensues between the two as they compete for their friends' loyalty. Meanwhile, at the behest of Kitty, Red befriends Pastor Dave (Kevin McDonald), which pleases her - at first.
80	4	"Hyde Gets the Girl"	David Trainer	Story by : Jill Effron; Teleplay by : Sarah McLaughlin & Alan Dybner	October 9, 2001	404	9.36
Tired of seeing Hyde stay single, the gang decides to throw a party, hoping that Hyde will meet a girl. Meanwhile, Fez becomes attracted to Big Rhonda after he gets drunk, and Bob and Kelso enter a radio contest, with a brand new van as the grand prize. Eventually, with the help of Jackie, Kelso wins the van. French Stewart guest stars.
81	5	"Bye-Bye Basement"	David Trainer	Mark Hudis	October 16, 2001	406	10.27
Hyde moves back in with the Formans, but refuses to reveal why. Meanwhile, Fez begins taking ballet lessons to meet women, and Kitty hires Leo (Tommy Chong) and his cousin, Theo (Richard Karn), to renovate the basement. Eventually, Hyde reveals that his father, Bud, has left again, necessitating Hyde to move back in with the Foremans. Also, Kelso and Jackie's relationship make Donna realize something about herself and Eric.
82	6	"The Relapse"	David Trainer	Jeff Filgo & Jackie Filgo	November 6, 2001	405	12.43
After Midge leaves Bob, he refuses to accept this, prompting Red to make Bob see the truth. Meanwhile, Kelso convinces Hyde and Fez to go check out older women and Eric tends to a heartbroken Donna, leading to an unexpected situation.
83	7	"Uncomfortable Ball Stuff"	David Trainer	Dave Schiff	November 13, 2001	407	9.55
Donna and Eric go as friends to the Price Mart Ball, but lingering feelings for one another seem to remain. Meanwhile, in need of money for a new pair of boots, Fez gets a job at the Foto Hut with Hyde.
84	8	"Donna's Story"	David Trainer	Philip Stark	November 20, 2001	409	8.79
After Donna writes a roman à clef in the school newspaper, her thinly veiled account of her and Eric's relationship makes Eric look bad, and he chooses to retaliate with his own story. Meanwhile, Bob introduces Red and Kitty to his new girlfriend, Joanne, and Kelso purchases a pinball machine for The Hub, which Fez later replaces with a Space Invaders machine in order to win over Jackie, but she (again) fails to notice.
85	9	"The Forgotten Son"	David Trainer	Kristin Newman	November 21, 2001	408	7.51
Red shoots an instructional video for Price Mart stock employees, but chooses to use Kelso instead of real stock-boy Eric. Meanwhile, Donna, searching for a mother figure, begins spending time with Kitty, which troubles Eric. Leo treats Hyde and Fez to a shopping spree, after he inherits a million dollars from a dead uncle.
86	10	"Red and Stacey"	David Trainer	Gregg Mettler	November 27, 2001	410	9.07
Red tries to set up Stacey (Erika Christensen), a Price Mart cashier, with Eric, only to find out Stacey already has a crush on Red himself, much to everyone's shock. Meanwhile, after Fez asks Big Rhonda on a date, Jackie and Donna give her a makeover.
87	11	"The Third Wheel"	David Trainer	Bryan Moore & Chris Peterson	December 11, 2001	412	9.16
The guys go bowling, where Hyde introduces his new girlfriend, Jill, but Eric (being the only one without a girlfriend) is not alright with Jill hanging out with the guys. Meanwhile, Donna is speechless when Bob and Joanne reveal they are intimate in their relationship, and Red must see to it that Pastor Dave returns to his ministry duties after he unexpectedly drops out from the church.
88	12	"An Eric Forman Christmas"	David Trainer	Dean Batali & Rob des Hotel	December 18, 2001	413	9.83
Eric is tasked with directing the church Christmas pageant, but his friends make a mess of things, leading to Eric getting kicked out of the director's chair by Pastor Dave. Meanwhile, Red is grumpy over Bob's Christmas spirit and a feud ensues. Also, Kelso loses faith for his favorite Christmas shows when his friends ridicule him, saying he's too old. Kevin McDonald makes his last appearance as Pastor Dave.
89	13	"Jackie Says Cheese"	David Trainer	Mark Hudis	January 8, 2002	414	10.08
When her father finds out about her relationship with Kelso, Jackie's allowance is cut off, forcing her to get a job as a cheese maiden at the local mall to finance her expenses. Meanwhile, a situation leads to Eric and Red not communicating with each other and a new foreign exchange student, Thomas (Nicholas Gonzalez), gets on Fez's nerves.
90	14	"Eric's Hot Cousin"	David Trainer	Will Forte	January 22, 2002	411	10.77
Eric's attractive cousin, Penny (Brittany Daniel), comes for a visit, and she reveals something to Eric that may serve to his pleasure. Kitty wants a pet, but Red buys her an animal she least expects, and Donna and Jackie try ways to get the guys' attention back towards them instead of Penny.
91	15	"Tornado Prom"	David Trainer	Dave Schiff	February 5, 2002	415	10.24
A tornado forces Eric and Donna to stay at the radio station, while the rest of the gang must hole up at the annual school prom. Hyde gets back at someone he hates, Fez gets his hopes high with Rhonda, and Jackie questions her popularity. Meanwhile, Joanne starts to get on Red's nerves.
92	16	"Donna Dates a Kelso"	David Trainer	Dean Batali & Rob des Hotel	February 5, 2002	417	10.84
Eric is named "Most Eligible Viking" at high school and starts flaunting his new title, while Jackie sets Donna up on a date with Kelso's older brother Casey (Luke Wilson). Meanwhile, Red buys a vintage Corvette, and Fez believes he will finally lose his virginity with Big Rhonda.
93	17	"Kelso's Career"	David Trainer	Gregg Mettler	February 12, 2002	418	7.37
In order to pay for a Valentine's Day gift for Jackie, Kelso donates sperm at a local sperm bank. Meanwhile, Donna is angry after being stood up by Casey, Fez begins gorging himself away with his chocolate gift to Big Rhonda, and Eric is troubled at Red when his father tells him "I love you."
94	18	"Leo Loves Kitty"	David Trainer	Will Forte	February 19, 2002	419	9.08
Leo (Tommy Chong) falls in love with Kitty after she nurses him following an accident, while Fez needs to find a way to pay Hyde for a broken taillight. When Kelso is offered a modeling job, Jackie begins to feel neglected by him.
95	19	"Jackie's Cheese Squeeze"	David Trainer	Chris Peterson & Bryan Moore	February 26, 2002	420	9.94
Eric blackmails Jackie, after he discovers her manager, Todd (Christopher Masterson), kissing her. Hyde, Fez and Donna are tricked into believing they are Eric's only confidants, while Red begins spending more time with his Corvette than with Kitty.
96	20	"Class Picture"	David Trainer	Kristin Newman	March 19, 2002	416	9.87
Trying to think of a quote for their 1978 yearbook pictures, the gang reminisces of their past experiences with one another and their families, and how they first met.
97	21	"Prank Day"	David Trainer	Alan Dybner	March 26, 2002	421	9.90
The guys try to get back at Kelso for pranking them, but the results are disastrous, even with an unexpected ally on their side. Meanwhile, Jackie spends the day with Donna in order to cheer her up.
98	22	"Eric's Corvette Caper"	David Trainer	Philip Stark	April 9, 2002	422	8.69
Eric takes Red's Corvette on a date to impress a cheerleader (Alice Frank) while Red and Kitty are out of town, but must ensure Red doesn't find out. Jackie and Donna go snooping around Casey's room while he's out of town, and have to deal with the person occupying Casey's room in his absence.
99	23	"Hyde's Birthday"	David Trainer	Mark Hudis	April 23, 2002	423	7.42
Kitty wants to throw a surprise party for Hyde's 18th birthday, but he refuses to attend. While Jackie and Fez bicker over how to decorate for the party, Eric, Donna and Kelso go out to find the perfect gift for Hyde.
100	24	"That '70s Musical"	David Trainer	Rob des Hotel & Dean Batali	April 30, 2002	425	7.76
A musical episode: Fez stars in the school musical pageant, but worries his friends will not attend to watch. His daydreams and fantasies throughout the episode include music from The Turtles, the Steve Miller Band, Nazareth, The Carpenters, and Peaches & Herb.
101	25	"Eric's False Alarm"	David Trainer	Dave Schiff	May 7, 2002	424	7.68
Eric learns Casey and Donna are going to spend the night at a hotel and follows them there. Meanwhile, Red and Kitty are concerned Bob is moving too quickly with Joanne, and Kelso thinks Jackie might be cheating on him.
102	26	"Everybody Loves Casey"	David Trainer	Gregg Mettler	May 14, 2002	426	7.04
Eric's plan to turn others against Casey backfires massively at a hot dog barbecue. Kelso sorts out his reasons for why he cheated on Jackie, and Fez makes a move on Big Rhonda.
103	27	"Love, Wisconsin Style"	David Trainer	Jeff Filgo & Jackie Filgo	May 21, 2002	427	9.17
Donna's degenerating behavior angers Bob, and Red helps straighten her out. Not wanting any trouble, Casey breaks up with Donna, who now wants Eric to accept her again, but his decision can cause a backlash in their former relationship. Following their breakup, Jackie tries to find a way to get back with Kelso, while Hyde and Fez look for someone to play a prank on. Eventually, Kelso and Donna find a way to get rid of all their problems - by leaving Point Place and heading to California.
