= That '70s Show season 5 =

That '70s Show
- Season 5
- DVD cover
- Starring: Topher Grace; Mila Kunis; Ashton Kutcher; Danny Masterson; Laura Prepon; Wilmer Valderrama; Debra Jo Rupp; Kurtwood Smith; Don Stark
- No. of episodes: 25

Release
- Original network: Fox
- Original release: September 17, 2002 – May 14, 2003

Season chronology
- ← Previous; Season 4 Next → Season 6

The fifth season of That '70s Show, an American television series, aired on Fox from September 17, 2002, to May 14, 2003. The region 1 DVD was released on October 17, 2006. This season is set entirely in the year 1978. All episodes are named after songs by Led Zeppelin.

After the fiasco with Kelso's brother Casey, a humiliated Donna runs away, and Eric, realizing he still loves her, goes after her. Eric and Donna get back together, but their parents are not happy about it. Despite their attempts to separate Eric and Donna, the couple make a decision to stay together, forever. After initially believing she was pregnant, Kitty is depressed when she discovers she is starting menopause, and everyone is walking on eggshells in terms of what to say around her. Kelso fled when Jackie wanted to marry him, but when he returns, he is in shock when he discovers who her new boyfriend is. Jackie has her own problems when her father gets arrested and her former life of ease is gone. Fez finds a new girlfriend in Nina and finally fulfills a long time dream. The gang is also about to graduate high school, with each member having a lot riding on their futures.

== Cast ==
=== Main ===
- Topher Grace as Eric Forman
- Mila Kunis as Jackie Burkhart
- Ashton Kutcher as Michael Kelso
- Danny Masterson as Steven Hyde
- Laura Prepon as Donna Pinciotti
- Wilmer Valderrama as Fez
- Debra Jo Rupp as Kitty Forman
- Kurtwood Smith as Red Forman
- Don Stark as Bob Pinciotti

=== Special guest appearance ===
- Tom Poston as Burt Sigurdson
- Bobcat Goldthwait as Eli
- Jim Gaffigan as Roy (Note: Also guest starred for one episode.)
- Sam Levine as Lance Crawford
- Chilli as Hot Nurse

=== Special guest ===
- Jessica Simpson as Annette
- Betty White as Beatrice Sigurdson
- Seth Green as Mitch
- Fred Williard as Charlie

=== Special appearance ===
- Lisa Robin Kelly as Laurie Forman

=== Recurring ===
- Mo Gaffney as Joanne
- Joanna Canton as Nina
- Jim Rash as Fenton

=== Guest ===
- Reid Scott as Ted
- Sarah Lancaster as Melanie
- Jack Osbourne as Andy

== Episodes ==
No. overall	No. in season	Title	Directed by	Written by	Original release date	Prod. code	Viewers (millions)
104	1	"Going to California"	David Trainer	Jeff Filgo & Jackie Filgo	September 17, 2002	501	10.01
In the late summer of 1978, desperately wanting to reveal his love for Donna, Eric disobeys his parents and heads to California to find Donna and Kelso. Kelso has an affair with Annette (Jessica Simpson), a blonde California girl. Meanwhile, Jackie and Hyde become closer than ever before. In the end, Donna and Eric get back together, and everyone returns home to Point Place.
105	2	"I Can't Quit You, Baby"	David Trainer	Gregg Mettler	September 24, 2002	502	8.92
As punishment for running away, Bob sends Donna to attend the Catholic school Our Lady of Perpetual Sorrow and Red takes away Eric's keys to the Vista Cruiser. To their surprise and disgust, Eric and Donna find out about the secret fling between Jackie and Hyde.
106	3	"What is and What Should Never Be"	David Trainer	Will Forte	October 29, 2002	503	10.28
Red isn't too happy when Kitty announces she's pregnant, while Eric and Donna try to convince Hyde to tell Kelso about his relationship with Jackie, eventually leading to Kelso finding out about them in an unexpected way.
107	4	"Heartbreaker"	David Trainer	Kristin Newman	October 29, 2002	504	12.07
Kitty's parents, Burt (Tom Poston) and Bea (Betty White), come for a visit to hear about her pregnancy, but Kitty has some major news regarding it. Kelso must come to terms with Hyde and Jackie's new relationship.
108	5	"Ramble On"	David Trainer	Philip Stark	November 12, 2002	505	8.38
Donna gives Eric a promise ring of her own, much to Eric's dislike due to the ring's appearance. Meanwhile, Fez applies for a job at the DMV, Hyde is bothered with Jackie's gossiping, and Red must deal with Kitty's temper over the discovery of her menopause.
109	6	"Over the Hills and Far Away"	David Trainer	Bryan Moore & Chris Peterson	November 19, 2002	506	8.74
Red and Kitty go with the guys on a weekend visit to UW–Madison, but Bob refuses to let Donna go with Eric. Meanwhile, Jackie is afraid Hyde will cheat on her while he is at Madison.
110	7	"Hot Dog"	David Trainer	Rob des Hotel	November 26, 2002	507	8.48
Eric buys Donna an engagement ring and decides to pop the question, but the rest of the gang disowns him for even thinking of doing such a thing. Hoping to cheer Kitty up, Red buys a new dog, Schatzi, to keep her company.
111	8	"Thank You"	David Trainer	Dean Batali	December 3, 2002	508	10.17
It's Thanksgiving, and to keep Red from finding out about his failing math grade, Eric forges his signature on a failing notice, and he and Donna decide to reveal their engagement during dinner. Laurie (Lisa Robin Kelly) returns home after a long absence.
112	9	"Black Dog"	David Trainer	Mark Hudis	December 10, 2002	509	8.98
Jackie's father gets arrested for bribery and embezzlement, but Hyde doesn't know how to respond to her sadness. Kelso accidentally shoots Hyde with a BB gun in the eye, and Fez tries to gain some affection from his new boss, Nina. Meanwhile, Eric, Donna, Red and Kitty have a disagreement over comforting loved ones.
113	10	"The Crunge"	David Trainer	Dave Schiff	December 17, 2002	510	8.84
Eric gets an unsatisfactory score on his SATs and wants to retake the tests, to prove he's worthy of marrying Donna. Jackie thinks Hyde's SAT score will bring the two of them fortune, while Kelso receives an unexpectedly high score and flaunts it around.
114	11	"The Girl I Love" (Note: This episode's name is a shortening of the Led Zeppelin song "The Girl I Love She Got Long Black Wavy Hair".)	David Trainer	Gregg Mettler	January 7, 2003	511	8.86
Fez introduces Nina to the gang, and Kitty invites them to a dinner party, but the guys and Red want to spend time doing other things.
115	12	"Misty Mountain Hop"	David Trainer	Dave Schiff	January 22, 2003	516	11.97
Jackie asks the Formans to help clean out her family's ski cabin, after the bank forecloses it. Not wanting Hyde to know about her situation, she tells him she's going to a "Doll Expo". This inspires Hyde to convince Kelso and Fez to go with up to the ski cabin and party all weekend, leading to a complex situation that could have dire consequences. Meanwhile, Eric wants to do new romantic things with Donna in order to spice up their relationship, but it doesn't go as planned for both of them.
116	13	"Your Time Is Gonna Come"	David Trainer	Story by : Will Forte; Teleplay by : Jackie Filgo & Jeff Filgo	January 29, 2003	514	13.21
Kelso's girlfriend from California, Annette (Jessica Simpson), comes to visit, and when Jackie angrily and impulsively tells her "Get your hands off my boyfriend!", Hyde hears her and becomes furious. Kitty's parents also arrive, bearing bad news, and tragedy strikes, as Kitty's father, Burt dies in the hospital.
117	14	"Babe I'm Gonna Leave You"	David Trainer	Kristin Newman	February 5, 2003	515	12.21
Jackie first tells Hyde that she's not responsible for what she says and that he has to get over it; Hyde then shocks Jackie by breaking up with her. Jackie later tries to sincerely apologize and tells Hyde she loves him. Annette forces Kelso to get rid of Jackie, or else she'll break up with him. Meanwhile, Kitty's mother, Bea is giving her and Donna a tough time. Betty White makes her final appearance as Kitty's mother.
118	15	"When the Levee Breaks"	David Trainer	Dean Batali	February 12, 2003	512	11.97
Eric and Donna use her house to practice being a married couple while Bob is out of town, but it doesn't go so well. Meanwhile, their friends are angry at them for not letting them throw a party at Donna's, and Kitty buys Hyde an embarrassing jacket.
119	16	"Whole Lotta Love"	David Trainer	Philip Stark	February 19, 2003	513	12.81
After Eric reveals his engagement to Red, he gives Eric the silent treatment and undermines his future, refusing to pay for Eric's college tuition, in an attempt to force Eric and Donna to call the engagement off. Meanwhile, Kelso gives Jackie a birthday gift, with ulterior motives, and Fez finally loses his virginity to Nina.
120	17	"The Battle of Evermore"	David Trainer	Rob des Hotel	February 26, 2003	517	11.05
Kitty signs Red and Eric up for a jamboree to help patch up their relationship, while Hyde, Fez, Jackie and Kelso search for an absent Leo.
121	18	"Hey, Hey, What Can I Do?"	David Trainer	Mark Hudis	March 12, 2003	518	11.66
The gang goes to a job fair, as Eric needs money to pay for his college tuition. Hyde is reluctant to get a job, until an old acquaintance of his offers him a position. Kelso chooses a future job no one else from the gang likes.
122	19	"Bring It On Home"	David Trainer	Chris Peterson & Bryan Moore	March 26, 2003	519	9.40
The Formans discover Jackie has been sleeping in their basement with Hyde, much to Red's dismay, and Bob volunteers to have Jackie over at his place, much to Donna's dismay. Fez realizes Nina is reluctant to introduce him to her family; however, it's for unexpected reasons.
123	20	"No Quarter"	David Trainer	Dean Batali	April 2, 2003	520	11.06
Jackie moves in with Bob and Donna, but the things she does in the Pinciotti house do not go over well with Donna. Eric has to pay for Donna's engagement ring with Red taking all his money from him on purpose, and Fez meets someone he knows and hates.
124	21	"Trampled Under Foot"	David Trainer	Philip Stark	April 9, 2003	521	11.18
Nina breaks up with Fez because he is "too needy". After realizing they have nothing to talk about anymore, the gang decide to add another member to their group, but don't know whom to invite. Kitty uses their situation to her advantage, only to discover how bad her candidate for a new member is.
125	22	"You Shook Me"	David Trainer	Kristin Newman	April 16, 2003	522	10.44
Fez has an erotic dream about a certain member of the gang, which greatly disturbs him....and Kelso. Kelso questions his own sexuality after hearing about Fez's dream, leading him to seek comfort in Jackie, much to Hyde's chagrin. Meanwhile, Joanne offers Eric a job at a local dog food factory.
126	23	"Nobody's Fault But Mine"	David Trainer	Mark Hudis	April 23, 2003	523	11.20
Hyde is caught with another woman, as revenge for seeing Jackie with Kelso. Red hastens Eric and Donna's wedding day, until Laurie, who has returned home, offers an alternative for the couple to get out of their situation.
127	24	"Immigrant Song"	David Trainer	Rob des Hotel	May 7, 2003	524	11.72
Red takes a day off to think of Eric and Donna's plan to move away to Madison, Hyde and Kelso continue to bicker about one another over Jackie, and a certain prank could result in Fez's deportation. Kelso falls off the water tower (again).
128	25	"Celebration Day"	David Trainer	Gregg Mettler	May 14, 2003	525	13.57
The gang goes camping the night before their high school graduation. Jackie decides to let Hyde and Kelso fight it out over her, to see who she'll choose in the end. Just as Eric and Donna get ready to leave Point Place, Laurie reveals she has married Fez so he can legally stay in the country, the shock of which causes Red to have a heart attack. Note: This is the last episode of Lisa Robin Kelly (Laurie Forman) in the show. In the following episodes, she is replaced by Christina Moore.
