= That '70s Show season 6 =

That '70s Show
- Season 6
- DVD cover
- Starring: Topher Grace; Mila Kunis; Ashton Kutcher; Danny Masterson; Laura Prepon; Wilmer Valderrama; Debra Jo Rupp; Kurtwood Smith; Don Stark
- No. of episodes: 25

Release
- Original network: Fox
- Original release: October 29, 2003 – May 19, 2004

Season chronology
- ← Previous; Season 5 Next → Season 7

The sixth season of That '70s Show, an American television series, aired on Fox from October 29, 2003, to May 19, 2004. The region 1 DVD was released on May 8, 2007. This season is set in 1978 for the first seven episodes of the season. The series transitions to 1979 beginning with the eighth episode of the season ("I'm a Boy").

All episodes are named after songs by The Who.

Eric and Donna's plans to move to Madison are dashed following Red's heart attack. Eric stays home and gets a new job to help the family out, and he and Donna decide to move forward with their wedding despite the setback. Kelso finally accepts Hyde and Jackie's relationship, but is in for another shock as he starts training at the police academy: he will be a father. Fez has married Eric's sister Laurie to avoid deportation, but they are far from in love. Jackie's mother returns after a long absence and begins dating Bob.

== Cast ==
=== Main cast ===
- Topher Grace as Eric Forman
- Mila Kunis as Jackie Burkhart
- Ashton Kutcher as Michael Kelso
- Danny Masterson as Steven Hyde
- Laura Prepon as Donna Pinciotti
- Wilmer Valderrama as Fez
- Debra Jo Rupp as Kitty Forman
- Kurtwood Smith as Red Forman
- Don Stark as Bob Pinciotti

=== Special guest ===
- Seth Green as Mitch Miller
- Estella Warren as Raquel
- Shannon Elizabeth as Brooke
- Alyson Hannigan as Suzy Simpson
- Rachel Bilson as Christy
- Luke Wilson as Casey
- Morgan Fairchild as Carolyn

=== Special guest appearance ===
- Jim Gaffigan as Roy
- Billy Dee Williams as Pastor Dan
- Tanya Roberts as Midge Pinciotti

=== Special appearance ===
- Brooke Shields as Pamela Burkhart

=== Recurring ===
- Jim Rash as Fenton
- Christina Moore as Laurie Forman
- James Avery as Officer Kennedy

=== Guest ===
- Dan Castellaneta as Agent Armstrong
- Ashley Drane as Julie

== Episodes ==
No. overall	No. in season	Title	Directed by	Written by	Original release date	Prod. code	Viewers (millions)
129	1	"The Kids Are Alright"	David Trainer	Jeff Filgo & Jackie Filgo	October 29, 2003	601	9.93
After Red's heart attack, Kitty has to take extra hospital shifts to support the family, worrying Eric, which he believes is a way to guilt him into not going to Madison with Donna. Jackie finally decides on Hyde over Kelso, but finds out the one she chooses already has another girl.
130	2	"Join Together"	David Trainer	Dean Batali	November 5, 2003	602	7.69
Hyde is still giving Jackie the cold shoulder, so Kelso decides to help get them back together. Eric depresses Donna about the last things they can do before she goes to Madison, just to have sex, and Kitty throws away all of Red's beer as a precaution to a future heart attack.
131	3	"The Magic Bus"	David Trainer	Rob Deshotel	November 12, 2003	603	8.31
It's Eric's 18th birthday and Donna is ready to leave for Madison. At the same time, he wonders why his "surprise birthday party" isn't being arranged by Kitty who has other plans in mind with Red.
132	4	"The Acid Queen"	David Trainer	Mark Hudis	November 19, 2003	604	8.47
Kelso tries to convince the gang he did it with Brooke, a former senior in high school when the gang were sophomores, during a Molly Hatchet concert, but she denies it. Jackie becomes jealous after Hyde admits Brooke is attractive, but he doesn't know how to lie righteously to her, and Kelso finds out Brooke's pregnant.
133	5	"I'm Free"	David Trainer	Gregg Mettler	November 26, 2003	605	6.78
In order to get past an INS investigator (Dan Castellaneta) on Fez and Laurie's marital status, Fez must live with the Formans to avoid deportation. Meanwhile, Brooke tells Kelso he's off the hook, but Kelso feels he has a responsibility to support her.
134	6	"We're Not Gonna Take It"	David Trainer	Dave Schiff	December 3, 2003	606	10.19
Kelso and Eric vie for a waiter job at Hyde's workplace and Red wants Fez and Laurie to get a divorce, until mysterious gifts suddenly arrive at the Formans' door. Donna and Jackie send fudge to a depressed Bob, disguised as secret admirers, to make him happy.
135	7	"Christmas"	David Trainer	Philip Stark	December 17, 2003	607	8.75
Jackie brings the gang to a high school Christmas dance in order for her to get back at the cheerleading squad for kicking her out. Eric forgets to visit Donna at the radio station while he, Hyde, and Fez are treated as celebrities at the dance, while Kelso wants to spend the night with Brooke at the library. Meanwhile, Red works in the local mall as Santa Claus, but Bob wants the job too.
136	8	"I'm a Boy"	David Trainer	Kristin Newman	January 7, 2004	608	8.05
Eric decides to lounge around at home and become obese, never leaving the comfort of his bed again. Kelso wants to start a serious relationship with Brooke, so he invites her, Hyde, and Jackie to go on a double date. Meanwhile, Fez drives Red around because of his heart attack and gets irritated. Note: First episode of the series where the license plate shows the year is 1979.
137	9	"Young Man Blues"	David Trainer	Bryan Moore & Chris Peterson	January 14, 2004	609	8.99
Kelso starts his first day as a cadet at the police academy, while Red teaches Eric to do home repairs, including plumbing and fixing the lawnmower. Jackie enrolls in a Big Sister program, but Donna bets she can't do a good enough job as a big sister.
138	10	"A Legal Matter"	David Trainer	Alan Dybner	February 4, 2004	610	12.67
Fez needs to take an exam to become an American citizen, so Red educates him about American history. Kelso thinks he is the academy's "stooge" and asks Eric and Hyde to help him break into the station to locate his file for verification.
139	11	"I Can See for Miles"	David Trainer	Sarah McLaughlin	February 11, 2004	611	12.30
After Kelso vandalizes one of Eric's belongings, Eric and Donna steal his van and travel to their planned wedding location. With his van gone, Kelso needs to find a way to take Brooke to a doctor's appointment, while Jackie redecorates Hyde's room, much to his discomfort, and Red is displeased when Bob gives him a pair of shoes.
140	12	"Sally Simpson"	David Trainer	Dean Batali	February 18, 2004	612	12.23
Fez falls for Suzy (Alyson Hannigan), one of Kelso's classmates at the police academy, however, her feelings lie on Kelso, which may cause his and Fez's friendship to break. A therapist wants to know the origin of Red's stress and Kitty believes the fault lies directly on her.
141	13	"Won't Get Fooled Again"	David Trainer	Rob Deshotel	February 25, 2004	613	11.78
Donna thinks she is pregnant, having missed a day from taking her birth control pills, which angers Red and Bob. After their dispute for Suzy, Kelso and Fez cease their friendship, but she tries to make amends for the both of them.
142	14	"Baby Don't You Do It"	David Trainer	Mark Hudis	March 3, 2004	614	9.69
Due to the false pregnancy scare, Eric and Donna are sent to attend premarital counseling at church, and a lie they tell puts them in an embarrassing situation. Kelso continues to lie to Brooke about his failing marks on his Penal Code tests and trouble comes when he accidentally sets the police academy on fire. After the premarital counseling, Donna decides she and Eric need to be celibate until they are married.
143	15	"Who are You?"	David Trainer	Gregg Mettler	March 10, 2004	615	10.88
Jackie's mother, Pam (Brooke Shields), returns from Acapulco and starts dating Bob and Kelso is reluctant about going to the police academy, forcing Eric, Hyde and Fez to get him back on his feet. Meanwhile, Donna's celibacy begins to drive Eric mad.
144	16	"Man with Money"	David Trainer	Bryan Moore & Chris Peterson	March 17, 2004	616	10.15
Red is at the mercy of a heart rate monitor, as it always goes off whenever Pam is around, making Kitty suspicious of him being attracted to her. Donna and Jackie try to split Bob and Pam up and have the idea of using Fez to seduce Pam.
145	17	"Happy Jack"	David Trainer	Kristin Newman	March 24, 2004	617	11.65
Donna is horrified after she finds Eric masturbating in her bathroom. Meanwhile, Hyde and Fez go to the academy to visit Kelso, but what they find is a completely straight-forward, honest person, rather than the bumbling idiot they know and love.
146	18	"Do You Think It's Alright?"	David Trainer	Patrick Kienlen	March 31, 2004	618	11.21
Eric and Donna have to go register for wedding gifts, but he does not like shopping with Donna. Hyde is worried all this wedding talk will make Jackie pressure him into proposing to her. Meanwhile, Red begins reading one of Kitty's erotic novels.
147	19	"Substitute"	David Trainer	Jennifer Keene	April 21, 2004	619	9.94
Eric feels bad after injuring Mitch (Seth Green), a former high school classmate, at a mini-golf stand and offers him to hang out in his basement. However, he begins to regret it, as Mitch starts making him look bad. Meanwhile, when Bob invites Pam to live with him, she breaks up with him, and Donna and Jackie try to get them back together.
148	20	"Squeeze Box"	David Trainer	Philip Stark	April 28, 2004	620	9.73
Eric's fidelity is in question, after he reveals he dated another girl when Donna and Casey were together. After Red and Hyde moved Pam's belongings into Bob's house, the two are speechless when they see Pam topless, and must try every way to hide this fact from Kitty and Jackie.
149	21	"5:15"	David Trainer	Gregg Mettler	May 5, 2004	621	9.04
Donna pretends to be Mitch's date for his brother's wedding, but he tells everyone she is his fiancée, proving Eric's suspicion of Mitch's growing affection for Donna. To regain his honor, Mitch challenges him to a fight. Meanwhile, Fez pretends to be rich, in order to impress a girl he meets at the wedding (Rachel Bilson). Kelso and Brooke attend parenting classes with Kitty as the instructor, and Red installs cable TV, only to have Hyde steal the signal.
150	22	"Sparks"	David Trainer	Rob Deshotel	May 12, 2004	623	11.53
Eric accidentally ruins Donna's wedding dress and must find a way to prevent her from knowing. Red, under the influence, buys a canoe at an auction with Kitty's wedding gift money and has to find another present to give to Eric, thus Hyde, Kelso and Fez try to find humorous ways of misusing the canoe.
151	23	"My Wife"	David Trainer	Dean Batali	May 16, 2004	622	7.70
Eric thinks he is holding Donna back on college and her dreams, after she leases a trailer for the two of them. While the guys go to Eric's bachelor party at a strip club, the girls attend Donna's bachelorette party, where they find Kelso's older brother Casey.
152	24	"Going Mobile"	David Trainer	Mark Hudis	May 19, 2004	624	10.15
As their wedding day approaches, Eric is having second thoughts, after a dream leaves him bewildered about his future and married life, and even Donna starts having cold feet. Hyde and Fez play their own form of rock-paper-scissors to determine who will be Eric's best man, and Kelso meets Brooke's mother (Morgan Fairchild), who wants Brooke to move to Chicago, Illinois with her. Eric disappears before the wedding rehearsal. Note: This is the last episode of Christina Moore (Laurie Forman) in the show and the end of the character, Laurie would be rarely mentioned after this episode.
153	25	"The Seeker"	David Trainer	Jeff Filgo & Jackie Filgo	May 19, 2004	625	13.47
With the wedding called off, Donna commiserates with Hyde at the water tower. After she accidentally knocks him off, Hyde ends up in the hospital, where nurse Kitty, researching his records, finds a different man listed on Hyde's birth certificate than the man Hyde had always thought was his father. Eric eventually returns, sneaking into Donna's bedroom to explain his disappearance, and Donna agrees she, too, was not ready for marriage.
