= That '70s Show season 8 =

That '70s Show
- Season 8
- DVD cover
- No. of episodes: 22

Release
- Original network: Fox
- Original release: November 2, 2005 – May 18, 2006

Season chronology
- ← Previous; Season 7

The eighth and final season of the American comedy television series That '70s Show aired on Fox, from November 2, 2005 to May 18, 2006, with the series finale. All 22 episodes of season 8, except the finale, are named after songs by Queen.

The eighth season marked a major change in the series, as the show's star Topher Grace who portrayed Eric Forman, the central character, left the series at the end of the previous season and was replaced by new character Randy Pearson (portrayed by Josh Meyers). Eric was often mentioned throughout the season, even being an important off-stage character central to an episode's plot upon occasion. Grace returned as Eric for the final episode, although his role was brief and uncredited.

Another major change was the departure of Michael Kelso, who was portrayed by Ashton Kutcher. Kutcher had quit the show at the end of season seven but remained on the series for five episodes during the eighth season. He appeared in the first four episodes to give closure to Kelso and he appeared again in the final episode.

Another big change to the show was the opening sequence that plays over the theme song; instead of the characters driving down a street in a car, they take turns singing lyrics of the theme song in "the circle", a camera angle used throughout the series when the group sits in a circle and gets intoxicated.

Leo (Tommy Chong) returned as a main character, following his return to the series in the seventh season in a special guest role.

Many plots of the season involved Donna's new relationship with Randy, Jackie falling in love with Fez, Hyde marrying a stripper named Samantha, Kelso getting a new job and moving to Chicago, and the Formans adjusting to an empty nest that is too empty for Kitty and not empty enough for Red because the other kids still were around despite Eric's absence.

This season is set entirely in 1979, with the final seconds of the series being the final seconds of the decade. The last seconds of the series show the license plate of Eric's Vista Cruiser for the final time, now featuring a tag with the year "80" on it, signaling that the 1980s have begun.

The DVD box set for season 8 was released by 20th Century Fox Home Entertainment in Region 1 on April 1, 2008, almost two years after it had completed broadcast on television.

== Cast ==
=== Main ===
- Mila Kunis as Jackie Burkhart
- Danny Masterson as Steven Hyde
- Laura Prepon as Donna Pinciotti
- Wilmer Valderrama as Fez
- Debra Jo Rupp as Kitty Forman
- Kurtwood Smith as Red Forman
- Josh Meyers (Note: Only credited for his respective episode appearances.) as Randy Pearson
- Don Stark as Bob Pinciotti
- Tommy Chong as Leo

=== Special guest ===
- Tim Reid as William Barnett
- Ashton Kutcher as Michael Kelso (episode 1-4, 22)
- Mary Tyler Moore as Christine St. George

=== Recurring ===
- Jim Rash as Fenton
- Bret Harrison as Charlie
- Jud Tylor as Samantha
- Lara Everly as Hilary

=== Guest ===
- Yvette Nicole Brown as Sgt. Davis
- Allison Munn as Caroline
- Robert Clotworthy as Customer
- Sam McMurray as Larry
- Carol Ann Susi as Receptionist
- Topher Grace as Eric Forman (uncredited)

=== Special appearance ===
- Bruce Willis as Vic
- Don Knotts as The Landlord
- Dick Van Patten as Murph
- Gavin MacLeod as Smitty
- Isaac Hayes as himself
- Tom Bosley as Dr. Hammond
- Barry Williams as Jeff
- Christopher Knight as Josh
- Justin Long as Andrew

== Episodes ==
No. overall	No. in season	Title	Directed by	Written by	Original release date	Prod. code	Viewers (millions)
179	1	"Bohemian Rhapsody"	David Trainer	Gregg Mettler	November 2, 2005	801	7.85
Kitty, Fez and Donna record a tape for Eric, summarizing what happened since he left. Red is ashamed of Kitty's experiment with something their son did prior to leaving. Hyde and Jackie argue about their relationship after Hyde punches Kelso, and it worsens when a stripper named Samantha finds the Formans' house and reveals her marriage to Hyde. Charlie falls off the water tower, but lacking Kelso's amazing luck in repeated falls, dies and has the water tower named after him.
180	2	"Somebody to Love"	David Trainer	Rob Deshotel	November 2, 2005	802	7.85
After Leo leaves an ambiguous note on Grooves' front door, a teenager named Randy Pearson (new cast member Josh Meyers) applies for a non-existing job. Hyde hires him while he is intoxicated, and after sobering up, wonders if it was a good decision. Jackie, Fez and Donna go to a bar so Jackie could hit on guys and then break their hearts to make her feel better. Red and Kitty try to get Hyde's wife, Samantha, to leave.
181	3	"You're My Best Friend"	David Trainer	Chris Peterson & Bryan Moore	November 9, 2005	804	6.98
Randy wants to throw Hyde a belated bachelor party and puts Kelso and Fez in charge of getting Hyde to the Formans' house without him knowing. But Kelso forgets his part of the plan and the guys end up in jail. Meanwhile, the Formans are furious when Leo has the strippers at their house and Jackie is horrified when Donna befriends Samantha.
182	4	"Misfire"	David Trainer	Kristin Newman	November 16, 2005	805	6.78
Kelso makes one last move on Jackie, but is offered a job at the Playboy Club in Chicago. Red and Kitty celebrate their anniversary, and Donna feels bad when Eric calls Kitty much more often than he calls her. Randy tries to console Donna. At the end of the episode, Kelso joins his friends in one last circle before he moves to Chicago.
183	5	"Stone Cold Crazy"	David Trainer	Dave Schiff	November 30, 2005	803	6.58
Kitty feels neglected by Red, so Samantha helps her improve her image. Now that Kelso has moved to Chicago, Jackie moves in with Fez, who has to deal with his crazy ex-girlfriend Caroline. With some help from Samantha, Donna takes nude photos to send to Eric; unfortunately, he is not the first one to see them. In a hilarious turn of events, the folder with the photos passes hands from Kitty to Leo; Kitty made the mistake of emptying the folder to put in a Marmaduke comic, and hid it, but it ended up with Hyde. Leo then hid them in a Barry White record that Fez bought at Grooves.
184	6	"Long Away"	David Trainer	Philip Stark	December 7, 2005	806	6.82
Donna starts spending more time with Randy, much to Fez and Jackie's suspicion, and the latter decides Eric has to know about this mingling. Red hires Leo to be his photographer at a Veterans' Reunion, as Red is now the most decorated veteran and wants to show off, but Leo steals the spotlight when he reveals his military past. Leo once had a promising life ahead of him following his service in the army, but ended up the stoner he is by accepting a lift home from musicians smoking marijuana. Later, Donna reveals that she and Eric broke up, and that's why she now hangs out with Randy.
185	7	"Fun It"	David Trainer	David Spancer	December 14, 2005	807	6.13
The gang decide to steal the Fatso Burger mascot, unfortunately upsetting the whole town; Jackie is against it due to her fear of clowns. As they are stealing the clown, Bob drives up to place an order. Fez (who was forced to duck behind the clown to avoid being seen) pretends to be an employee speaking over the intercom and angers Bob so that he speeds away. The guys and Donna emerge from where they were hiding and take the clown back to the Formans' basement. Kitty finds Fatso's head inside the freezer, demanding the kids put him back. They attempt doing so, but Fez doesn't fasten the bolts correctly and accidentally knocks Fatso down, smashing him to pieces. Everyone flees, but only after Donna snatches the clown's nose.
186	8	"Good Company"	David Trainer	Dean Batali	January 12, 2006	808	5.07
Jackie discovers Donna's crush on Randy, while Kitty is angry at Fez after he begins dating one of her friends. Donna's birthday is approaching and her friends don't know what present to give her.
187	9	"Who Needs You"	David Trainer	Sarah McLaughlin	January 19, 2006	811	5.23
Kitty and Red get annoyed with Hyde and Samantha's constant fighting. After Jackie floods Fez's apartment and almost gets them evicted, she decides to help in the most feminine way. Donna tries to get people to donate money for a children's library and is in for some disappointment about the fans of "Hot Donna"; her popularity has gone down, forcing her to make drastic promises. Hyde later reveals to Red and Kitty that his and Samantha's arguing is to spice up their love life, which had gotten boring; intrigued, Red and (after some initial confusion) Kitty give it a try.
188	10	"Sweet Lady"	David Trainer	Alan Dybner	January 26, 2006	809	5.68
Donna is suspicious of Randy's intentions when he invites her to a cabin under questionable pretenses. Jackie wants to work for Christine St. George (Mary Tyler Moore), a talk show host for What's Up, Wisconsin?. Hyde meets Red's older friends and questions his marriage.
189	11	"Good Old Fashioned Lover Boy"	David Trainer	Greg Schaffer & Steve Joe	February 2, 2006	810	5.76
Jackie needs Kitty's help to get Christine St. George to like her. Leo has a crush on someone quite unexpected and asks the other guys for help.
190	12	"Killer Queen"	David Trainer	Mark Hudis	February 9, 2006	812	4.68
It's Valentine's Day, and Hyde forgot. Red shows Hyde a stash of presents he hides in the basement; he keeps them in case of Kitty's birthday, their anniversary or Valentine's Day due to missing Kitty's birthday one year (Kitty's Birthday (That Today?!!) in Season Three). After Hyde makes his pick, Red comes down later for Kitty's gift to find the stash missing; it turns out Samantha had caught Hyde with the stash and mistook it all as his gift for her. Fez and Jackie fake a relationship for Christine St. George on What's Up, Wisconsin? when a guest fails to appear. Donna helps Randy plan out his Valentine's Day and is surprised to learn who his date is.
191	13	"Spread Your Wings"	David Trainer	Gregg Mettler	March 16, 2006	813	5.63
Donna unsuccessfully tries to keep her relationship with Randy a secret. Fez tries to impress a co-worker named Hillary at all costs, while Jackie gets a new job, but finds it quite disappointing. Kitty and Red clean Eric's old bedroom with Randy's help. Things take a turn for the worse when Kitty catches Randy and Donna kissing in the room.
192	14	"Son and Daughter"	David Trainer	Ken Blankstein	March 23, 2006	817	5.49
Hyde has to watch over his father's house when he goes out of town. A subsequent party goes out of control and only Leo can fix the damage. Kitty is still furious at Donna for kissing Randy in Eric's old bedroom and tries to ridicule her. After defending Randy, Red stays at Bob's to avoid further fights with Kitty. Donna later explains that she broke up with Eric to Kitty, who understands and forgives Red for standing up to her.
193	15	"Keep Yourself Alive"	David Trainer	Dave Schiff	April 13, 2006	814	3.72
Fez loses Kitty's wedding ring and the gang spends their night in the woods looking for it, with Donna and Randy trying desperately to be alone, but unable due to Jackie and Hyde's fighting. Red is uncomfortable when Bob says too much about the same ring (which he found a great discount for) in front of Kitty (whom he has always told that he bought the ring at a larger price just for her).
194	16	"My Fairy King"	David Trainer	Philip Stark	April 27, 2006	815	4.47
Hyde finds out a terrible truth about Samantha that causes their marriage to end; she's already married to a much older man, meaning that their marriage is fake. Red finds a rival muffler shop is taking all his customers; without much choice, he decides to go into retirement. Jackie makes up a list of qualities she needs in a man and is overwhelmed when she realizes her perfect match is the very man who has been after her from the beginning - Fez.
195	17	"Crazy Little Thing Called Love"	David Trainer	Kristin Newman	April 27, 2006	816	5.50
Jackie goes to a therapist to understand her feelings for Fez; she learns that she only wanted Kelso and Hyde before since they were unavailable, and now that Fez is dating, she wants him. Hyde keeps a retired Red busy, but regrets it later. Meanwhile, Fez is shocked to find his girlfriend dumping him for a very unusual reason; believing no one could do better than Fez for sex, she decides to become a nun. Jackie learns of Fez's dilemma, and much to her own surprise, she finds herself still wanting him.
196	18	"We Will Rock You"	David Trainer	Chris Peterson & Bryan Moore	May 4, 2006	818	4.64
The gang meets a variety of people at a "Disco Sucks" bonfire. Jackie unsuccessfully tries to use the occasion to get closer to Fez. Meanwhile, Kitty and Red have a visit from new neighbors (Barry Williams & Christopher Knight) and are excited about making new friends, but are caught off guard upon discovering one small detail: the new neighbors are an openly gay couple.
197	19	"Sheer Heart Attack"	David Trainer	Steve Joe & Greg Schaffer	May 4, 2006	820	5.69
After numerous amorous adventures, Fez decides to stay with only one girl, and returns to his ex-girlfriend Caroline (the psychotic one), much to Jackie's dismay. She confesses her feelings to Fez, but he rejects her. Red and Hyde try to sell unneeded heart pills without Kitty's consent; Red's old war friends are grateful for them, as one can fall asleep before his wife now. When Kitty mistakenly believes Hyde is stealing his stash, he blackmails Red into getting him a television. However, one of Red's friends shows up for some of the pills, blowing their cover.
198	20	"Leaving Home Ain't Easy"	David Trainer	Chris Peterson & Bryan Moore & Kristin Newman	May 11, 2006	819	6.18
Bob wants Red and Kitty to move to Florida with him, while Randy suggests Donna move in with him. To Red's surprise, Bob has decided on the genius move of opening a bait shop in a neighborhood five miles from any other; they end up fighting over what to name the shop, since Bob's ideas are ridiculous puns. Although she had been crying, Jackie snaps back to her old shallow self; she has decided to harm Fez emotionally, just as he did to her. Among many things, Jackie ruins the buttons on Fez's shirts and paints offensive messages on his car. At his wits end, Fez decides to take revenge on Jackie the best way he knows how; he puts green dye in her shampoo. When confronted, Fez tells Jackie that he just made her as ugly on the outside as she is on the inside.
199	21	"Love of My Life"	David Trainer	Philip Stark & Dave Schiff	May 18, 2006	821	8.58
Hyde finds a memo from his father, revealing that the Grooves franchise has been sold for a ridiculous amount of money. Fez's friend visits from their home country, bringing more powerful marijuana. Hyde takes too much and hallucinates everyone as different versions himself; as a result, he cleans up his act and becomes a more efficient person. At the same time Red and Kitty try to sell their house, and Randy tries to figure out what went wrong in his relationship with Donna. The gang help Hyde understand it wasn't the marijuana that made him freak out; the thought of losing his job and not knowing what to do next was. Hyde's father visits Grooves, revealing that the Point Place store is to be left to Hyde, who "celebrates" with Leo and his father. Fez's friend convinces him to return home, since Jackie has rejected him. However, once Jackie learns just how heartbroken she made Fez, she decides to give being a couple a try, forgiving him. Kitty informs everyone Eric is coming home from Africa.
200	22	"That '70s Finale"	David Trainer	Gregg Mettler	May 18, 2006	822	10.02
In the 200th episode and series finale, it is December 31, 1979, the final day of the '70s. In a bit of a clip show, all the characters reminisce about the decade. Hyde helps a hesitant Kitty and Red decide about moving. Fez searches for the perfect time and place for his first kiss with Jackie while Kelso returns to spend the last night of the '70s with his friends. Kelso also falls off the water tower (again), after being tricked by Fez and Hyde. Red and Kitty announce to their guests that they decided not to move to Florida. As Donna leaves the room for some air, Eric returns just in time for New Year's Eve. He apologizes to Donna, who says things "are a lot different now", and they kiss and reconcile. Eric then joins the guys in the final "circle" of the decade when Donna and Jackie tell them to get upstairs to ring in the new year. But before they do, Eric states the last person upstairs has to call Red a dumbass. Everyone races upstairs, leaving Kelso behind after Hyde pushes him. Kelso is the final character to be seen as he dejectedly grabs "the stupid helmet" and prepares to call Red a dumbass. As the '70s end, the episode ends in a final shot of the Formans' basement with the voices of everyone upstairs counting down to midnight. The episode ends abruptly just as they reach "one", cutting to the license plate of the Vista Cruiser one last time reading "That '70s Show" with an "80" registration tag. The end credits roll over the very same last scene from the first episode, of the gang singing "Hello It's Me" by Todd Rundgren.
