= Going to California (disambiguation) =

"Going to California" is a 1971 song by Led Zeppelin.

Going to California may also refer to:

- Going to California (TV series), an American television series
- Going to California (That '70s Show), an episode of the television series That '70s Show
- Going to California (Tears for Fears video), a 1990 concert performance video by the group Tears for Fears
