= We're Not Gonna Take It =

We're Not Gonna Take It may refer to:

- "We're Not Gonna Take It" (Twisted Sister song)
- "We're Not Gonna Take It" (The Who song), a song by The Who that includes the single "See Me, Feel Me" from Tommy
- "We're Not Gonna Take It" (That '70s Show), an episode of the TV series That '70s Show

== See also ==
- "Ain't Gonna Take It", a 1978 song by the Tom Robinson Band
