= List of That '70s and '90s Show characters =

This is a list of characters appearing in the television series That '70s Show and That '90s Show.

== Cast table ==
Character	Portrayed by	That '70s Show								That '90s Show	
Character	Portrayed by	1	2	3	4	5	6	7	8	1	2
Eric Forman	Topher Grace	Main	Main	Main	Main	Main	Main	Main	Guest (Note: Uncredited in That '70s Show Season 8.)	Guest	
Jackie Burkhart	Mila Kunis	Main	Main	Main	Main	Main	Main	Main	Main	Guest	
Michael Kelso	Ashton Kutcher	Main	Main	Main	Main	Main	Main	Main	Recurring	Guest	
Steven Hyde	Danny Masterson	Main	Main	Main	Main	Main	Main	Main	Main		
Donna Pinciotti	Laura Prepon	Main	Main	Main	Main	Main	Main	Main	Main	Recurring	Recurring
Fez	Wilmer Valderrama	Main	Main	Main	Main	Main	Main	Main	Main	Recurring	
Kitty Forman	Debra Jo Rupp	Main	Main	Main	Main	Main	Main	Main	Main	Main	Main
Red Forman	Kurtwood Smith	Main	Main	Main	Main	Main	Main	Main	Main	Main	Main
Midge Pinciotti	Tanya Roberts	Main	Main	Main			Guest	Recurring			
Bob Pinciotti	Don Stark	Main	Main	Main	Main	Main	Main	Main	Main	Guest	Recurring
Laurie Forman	Lisa Robin Kelly	Recurring	Main (Note: Credited in That '70s Show through episodes 1-10 and 13 as main cast; otherwise does not appear and is uncredited.)	Main		Recurring					
Laurie Forman	Christina Moore						Recurring				
Leo Chingkwake	Tommy Chong		Recurring	Recurring	Main			Recurring	Main	Recurring	Guest
Randy Pearson	Josh Meyers								Main		
Leia Forman	Callie Haverda									Main	Main
Gwen Runck	Ashley Aufderheide									Main	Main
Jay Kelso	Mace Coronel									Main	Main
Nate Runck	Maxwell Acee Donovan									Main	Main
Ozzie Takada	Reyn Doi									Main	Main
Nikki Velasco	Sam Morelos									Main	Main

== Main characters ==
=== Eric Forman ===
Portrayed by Topher Grace: The protagonist; Eric is a nice guy, generally nerdy, clumsy, and accident-prone. He does, however, have a deadpan sense of humor that rivals that of his father, Red, and is far from afraid of asserting himself should he be pushed too far. Eric convinces his parents to let his best friend Steven Hyde move in with them, making Hyde like a brother. Red is always hard on him (as a way to toughen him to be a man). He is in a relationship with his longtime love and neighbor Donna Pinciotti. He decides to become a teacher after high school, and he leaves the series at the end of the seventh season to teach in Africa. Eric returns for the series finale, reuniting with Donna. In That '90s Show, it is revealed that Eric eventually married Donna and they had a daughter named Leia, named after Princess Leia. They moved to Chicago and he became an adjunct professor at an unnamed university, teaching "the religion of Star Wars". Eric is based on the adolescence of show creator Mark Brazill.

=== Donna Pinciotti ===
Portrayed by Laura Prepon: Eric's longtime girlfriend (and briefly fiancée). Donna is intelligent, good-looking, and a feminist tomboy. Although she does not agree with what Jackie represents in the beginning of the series, they become friends. Donna is in a relationship with Eric for seven seasons (despite their break-up during season 4). She has brief romances with Michael's brother Casey and with Randy during the final season before rekindling her relationship with Eric at the end of the show's finale. In the time in between the finale of That '70s Show and That '90s Show, Donna and Eric married, moved to Chicago, and had a daughter named Leia, after the Star Wars character Princess Leia. She became a professional author.

=== Steven Hyde ===
Portrayed by Danny Masterson: Eric's best friend and the anti-establishment member of the group. By the end of season one, Kitty Forman prevails on her husband to allow Hyde to move in after he was abandoned by his mother (played by Katey Sagal) and living in squalor. Hyde is promoted to brother to Eric as soon as he moves in. Hyde has a witty, blunt, and sarcastic sense of humor, and a rebellious personality. He is also the smartest and most practical friend in the group, and the other members often ask for his advice. Although Hyde dates Jackie for three seasons, they eventually part and in the final season he marries an exotic dancer/stripper named Samantha, who (unknown to Hyde) was still wed to her first husband, Larry (Sam McMurray), when she married him. As Donna points out in "My Fairy King", that means Hyde and Samantha are not legally married. In the seventh season, Hyde meets his biological father (William Barnett, played by Tim Reid), a wealthy African-American businessman. Hyde also has a strait-laced half-sister named Angie from this newfound relationship. Barnett, who owns a chain of record stores, makes Hyde the manager (and later the owner) of the Point Place store called Grooves. Due to the allegations of sexual assault (and subsequent conviction) made against Masterson, Hyde does not appear nor is he mentioned in That '90s Show.

=== Michael Kelso ===
Portrayed by Ashton Kutcher: The dim-witted, sex-obsessed pretty boy of the group who wants to coast through life on his good looks. He spends the first half of the series in a relationship with the equally vapid Jackie but their relationship comes to an end when Jackie finds out he's been cheating on her with Laurie. In the season 4 finale, Jackie wants to marry Michael but he isn't ready, so he runs away to California with Donna. His best friend is Fez. He fathers a baby girl named Betsy during the seventh season after getting a girl named Brooke pregnant. He becomes a police officer but gets kicked off the force because he does just about everything wrong. He gets a job as a security guard at a Playboy Club in Chicago, and leaves the series during the eighth and final season. He only appears in five episodes during season eight, including the series finale. In the first episode of That '90s Show, Kelso makes a guest appearance where it is revealed he and Jackie were on their "second re-marriage" and that he had become a father for (at least) a second time with a son named Jay. In the second season, his daughter Betsy mentions that he and her mother were together again for two years while he and Jackie were divorced.

Kelso was portrayed once again by Kutcher in a Robot Chicken sketch entitled "That '00s Show". Critics have noted striking similarities to the portrayal of Kutcher's character Walden Schmidt on Two and a Half Men to that of Kelso. Walden's personality, however, drastically changed since his initial appearances and by the series' end he was a completely changed man. Other similarities drawn are between that of his role as Jesse Montgomery III in the stoner film Dude, Where's My Car? (2000).

=== Jacqueline "Jackie" Beulah Burkhart ===
Portrayed by Mila Kunis: The youngest member of the group, Jackie starts the series as being pretty, rich, stylish, spoiled, selfish, conceited, annoying, and immature. She makes thoughtless and superficial comments, which occasionally turn out to be correct. As the series progresses, her wealthy father is jailed and her mother (first played by Eve Plumb in an early episode, and later, permanently, by Brooke Shields) abandons Point Place. Jackie is forced to take a job and becomes less self-centered and needful of genuine love and affection. Partly as a result of these changes, she and Donna become better friends. By the end of the series, Jackie has dated three of the four men of the original group: Kelso, Hyde, and Fez. Jackie lives with Donna after her dad is put in jail and her mom runs away to Mexico. It is revealed in That 90s Show that she continued an on and off relationship with Michael Kelso, marrying him at least twice, and had a son and stepdaughter with him named Jay and Betsy, respectively.

=== Fez ===
Portrayed by Wilmer Valderrama: The foreign exchange student of the group, whose hormones seem to be out of control. His country of origin is one of the longest-running gags on the show. He is sweet, friendly, perverted, gullible, and rather odd. He enjoys eating candy, drinking beer, and looking at pornography. His best friend is Michael Kelso, and he shares a "younger brother" type relationship with Hyde and Eric. He constantly flirts with Jackie and Donna and often makes romantic advances toward them. Initially, he has a lot of trouble getting attention from girls, but during the eighth season, he becomes a ladies' man. He is in love with Jackie throughout the series, but his love is not reciprocated until the eighth season when they become a couple. However, by the time That '90s Show begins, Fez and Jackie had broken up (a result of Jackie cheating on him with Kelso) and has begun a relationship with Sherri Runck. It is also revealed that Fez had opened up a successful chain of beauty salons in Point Place, and is the only one of Eric’s friends to have maintained a close relationship with the Formans - aside from Donna, who is now married into the family. The series' official web site explains the spelling "Fez", as opposed to "Fes" (short for Foreign Exchange Student), as "poetic license".

=== Red Forman ===
Portrayed by Kurtwood Smith: Kitty's husband, Eric and Laurie's father, and Hyde's surrogate father. Red is a Navy combat veteran, having served in World War II and the Korean War. Impatient, short-tempered, often grouchy and constantly threatening to "put my foot in your ass", he occasionally displays a soft side. His hobbies include working with his power tools, watching television, reading the newspaper, hunting, and fishing. He is also a huge fan of the Green Bay Packers; in a nod to the Packers' mostly dismal records of the 1970s, in one episode when the Formans are in church, Red silently prays "Dear Lord...Would it kill you to give the Packers a winning season?" He shows no respect for Fez because he's a foreigner, sometimes he gives him offensive nicknames like "Tonto" and "Ali Baba". In That '90s Show, Red plays a central role, as his granddaughter (and series protagonist) Leia spends the summer with him and Kitty. Much to Red's chagrin, Leia and her friends spend most of their time hanging out in his basement and, as such, acts curmudgeonly towards them.

=== Kitty Forman (née Sigurdson) ===
Portrayed by Debra Jo Rupp: Eric's and Laurie's mother and Red's wife, Kitty is a cheerful, doting, often oversolicitous mother, who can turn cold and assertive when pushed too far. A nurse and former alcoholic (though she begins again occasionally), her major mood swings are usually attributed to menopause. She is also an overly nurturing mother figure to Eric's friends, especially Fez and Hyde. In That '90s Show, Kitty continues her overbearing actions towards her granddaughter Leia and is overjoyed with happiness with the prospect of Leia and her friends spending time at their house. Kitty also reveals a semi-progressive side of herself, as she accepts Ozzie when he comes out as gay to her. In flashbacks, she was played by Ashley Peldon.

=== Bob Pinciotti ===
Portrayed by Don Stark: Midge's husband, Donna's father. Bob often brags about his service in the National Guard, which invariably irritates Red. Bob is also known for walking around his house with his robe wide open wearing no underwear. He eats constantly, even in bed. Bob is almost always in a good mood and is a ladies' man. His best friend is Red, even though Red sees him as a nuisance. He usually takes the brunt of Red's abuse in a jolly manner. Bob makes a guest appearance in Season 1 of That '90s Show. In this appearance, Bob remains cheerful, jolly, and silly. However, he shows a degree of jealousy towards Red and Kitty for having the ability to spend more time with their granddaughter Leia. Bob attempts to one up them by giving Leia more expensive gifts. In season 2, Bob is a recurring character, leaving his retirement home in Florida to live across the street from the Formans.

=== Midge Pinciotti ===
Portrayed by Tanya Roberts: Bob's wife and Donna's mother. Midge is the woman that Eric and his male friends fantasize about when coming of age. Although often dim-witted, she is also a kind-hearted woman who develops feminist ideals. She and Bob divorce when she is written out of the series after the third season. She later returns during the sixth and seventh seasons, in a recurring role where she and Bob almost reunite, but they then decide that they are better off apart.

=== Laurie Forman ===
Portrayed by Lisa Robin Kelly/Christina Moore: Eric's beautiful but mean and promiscuous older sister. She is also the foster sister of Steven Hyde. Laurie enjoys tormenting Eric and manipulating her father. She is often seen with various men, mainly Eric's friend Kelso (who cheats on his girlfriend Jackie). Eric, Hyde, and Donna often mock her promiscuity, including calling her "The Village Whore". Laurie has a strained relationship with her mother who, unlike her father, sees Laurie for what she really is. Red finally sees her real self in "Laurie Moves Out", but afterward, still doesn't try to help her become a productive member of society. Laurie leaves the series during the third season but returns in a recurring role during the fifth, somewhat chastened. At one point, she genuinely seeks out a loving relationship (rather than merely physical) with Kelso, who is dumbfounded. She also becomes attached to a baby for whom she is babysitting and feels quasi-maternal pangs, which soon disappear. In season five, she and Fez marry to prevent him from getting deported. In season six she regresses to her previous self, and at one point, Red and Kitty genuinely ponder whether she may have children they don't know about. She and Fez are shown to be unhappy in their marriage, with her constantly cheating, and eventually, with pressure from Red, divorce off-screen after Fez gets his green card. Due to Kelly's health issues, Laurie was portrayed by Moore in season six. She does not appear after the sixth season. In the seventh season, she is briefly mentioned to have moved to Canada. In the series finale, Kitty asks if anyone has seen her recently. In the first season of That 90s Show she is indirectly referenced when Red mentions that Eric is their second child. In the seventh episode of the second season, Kitty mentions that she has a lot of pregnancy tests left over from when Laurie was in high school, referring to her daughter as "social". In the thirteenth episode of this season, she is mentioned to have been arrested shoplifting with her youth pastor.

=== Leo Chingkwake ===
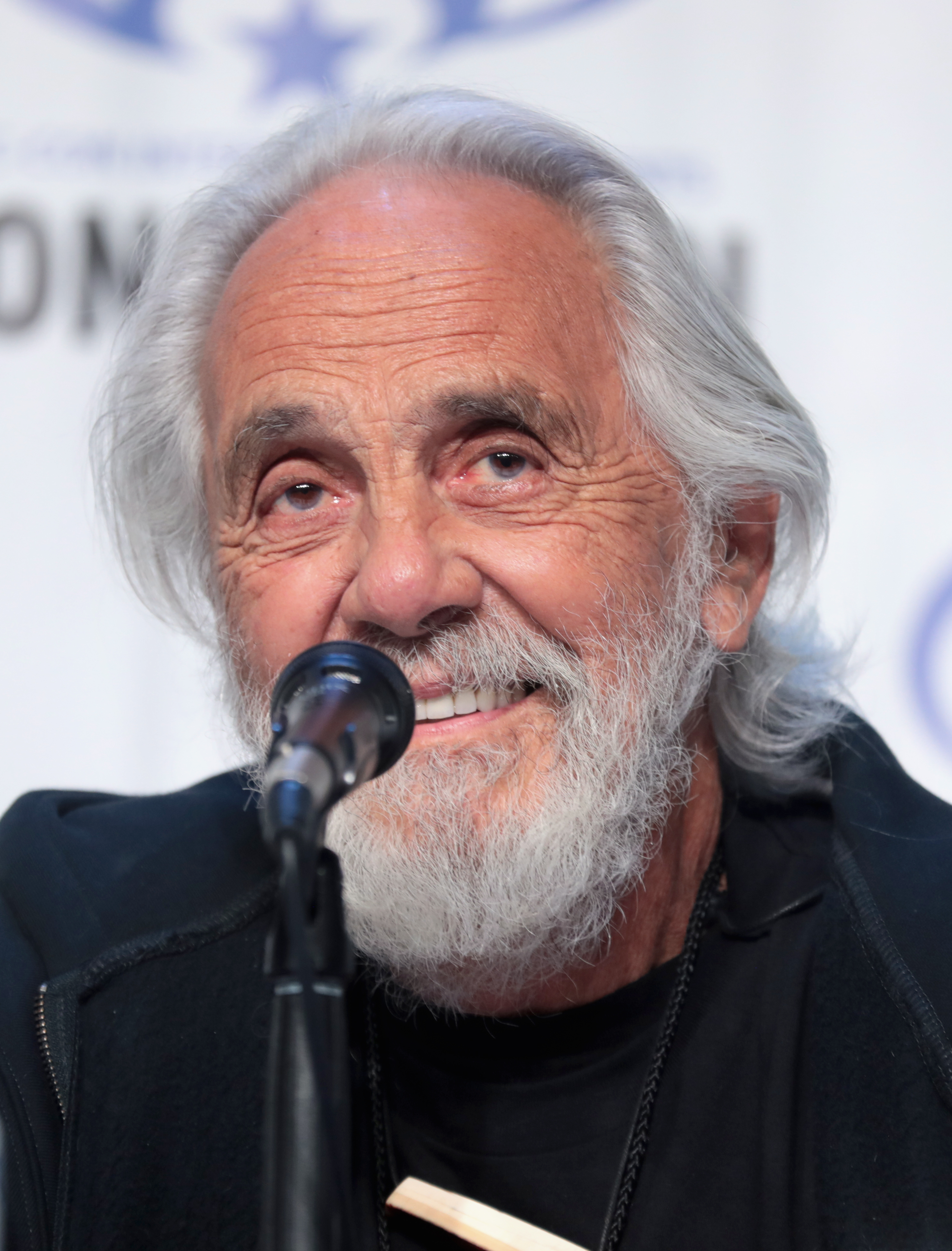
Tommy Chong played Leo

Portrayed by Tommy Chong: A hippie, and the owner of a Foto Hut at which Hyde once worked. Leo is an Army veteran who served in World War II, where he was awarded a Purple Heart. He would have had a promising medical career ahead of him after the war ended, but he became the stoner he is today after accepting a ride home with some jazz musicians that were smoking marijuana. Leo often puts play before work and maintains an easy-going attitude in most things, business included. Due to Chong's real-life legal issues at the time, he disappears from the series after season four but is later referenced in season five's "The Battle of Evermore", when the gang goes on an unsuccessful mission to find him, finding only a letter from him explaining that he remembered he has a wife and should probably go back to her. Following Chong's release from prison, he returns in season seven and remains on the series until the show's end. In season 8, he gets a new job working for Hyde at Grooves. Leo makes two appearances in Season 1 of That '90s Show, where it is revealed he has remained a stoner and has unsuccessfully auditioned for The Real World. He also returns in the second season finale, celebrating his "retirement party" at the Forman house.

=== Randy Pearson ===
Portrayed by Josh Meyers: The newest member of the group, Randy is introduced in the final season. Tall and handsome, he is laid back, polite, and forms a friendship with Red who is impressed at Randy's skill at fixing things. While Hyde, Jackie, Donna, and Kelso accept him as a new member of their group, Fez does not. Randy dates Donna for the majority of season eight, causing Kitty to be infuriated with both of them. Donna eventually breaks up with him, and reconciles with Eric when he returns in the last episode of the series.

=== Leia Forman ===
Portrayed by Callie Haverda. She's the teenage daughter of Eric and Donna Forman and granddaughter of Red and Kitty Forman and Bob Pinciotti, who moves in with them for the summer. She is named after Princess Leia, and while Eric wanted to add another Star Wars reference making her middle name Tatooine, Donna overrode him and made it Anne.

=== Gwen Runck ===
Portrayed by Ashley Aufderheide, Gwen is a rebellious Riot Grrrl with a loyal heart.

=== Jay Kelso ===
Jay is portrayed by Mace Coronel. He's a charming, flirty young videographer, Leia's love interest, and the son of Michael Kelso (Ashton Kutcher) and Jackie Burkhart (Mila Kunis) from the original series.

=== Nate Runck ===
Portrayed by Maxwell Acee Donovan, Nate is Gwen's easygoing and fun-loving half-brother (as they have the same mother).

=== Ozzie Takada ===
Portrayed by Reyn Doi, Ozzie is an insightful and perceptive teen who is openly gay. However, his parents are not aware of his sexual orientation.

=== Nikki Velasco ===
Portrayed by Sam Morelos, Nikki is Nate's ambitious and intelligent girlfriend.

== Recurring characters ==
- Angie Barnett (played by Megalyn Echikunwoke) is Hyde's half-sister. Hyde did not know he had a sister until season 7. Angie graduated from college as a mathematics major. Angie and Hyde worked together managing their father's record store, but Angie did not always like working with him. She dated Kelso, which sometimes annoyed Hyde. Angie got her name because all season 7 episodes were named after Rolling Stones songs, and "Angie" was a song by the Stones.
- Annette Berkardt (played by Jessica Simpson) was Kelso's girlfriend for a brief period of time in season 5. She acts and talks very similar to Jackie, constantly bossing Kelso around. Eric and Donna once referred to her as a blonde version of Jackie, or "Blackie." Despite this, Jackie and Annette hated each other. Once at The Hub, Jackie said to Annette "I did not know they let 'slutballs' in here". Annette said since she saw Jackie in there she thought it was okay. Later in the episode, when Annette and Kelso were kissing, Jackie yelled "Get off my boyfriend!" to Annette, even though it was months after Kelso and Jackie broke up. This led to Hyde wanting to break up with Jackie. After Hyde and Jackie both reconciled and seeing Kelso is still not over Jackie, Annette decides to break up with Kelso and go back home to California.
- Beatrice "Bea" Sigurdson (played by Betty White) is Kitty's mother. Bea seems like a friendly old lady but is cold and critical, especially of Kitty. She appeared in a few episodes in season five, often nagging at Burt or saying something rude to Kitty in a faux-friendly manner. She was widowed in "Your Time is Gonna Come" when Burt collapses in the driveway and is rushed to the hospital where he dies. She shows little emotion after her husband's death but Kitty does catch her crying in a bedroom. Bea stays with the Formans for a while after Burt's death, causing Kitty considerable stress. She is mentioned as being deceased by the time of the first episode of That 90s Show. In the seventh episode of That 90s Show, Kitty mentions that they spread Bea's ashes outside a Sizzler restaurant. Kitty also claims in the episode "Life Is A Highway" of That 90s Show that she made a joke at her husband's deathbed, but this is impossible given how he died.
- Bernice Forman (played by Marion Ross) is Red's mother. Bernice resented Kitty and was always mean to her. Kitty revealed it was because Red married her instead of an attractive and wealthy woman he once dated who Bernice liked. She appeared in the episodes "Sunday, Bloody Sunday", "The Best Christmas Ever" and "Grandma's Dead" of season 1, and in a flashback in the episode "Halloween" of season two. In the episode "Grandma's Dead" she dies in Eric's car while he is driving her home after Eric tells her off for her treatment of his mother.
- Brooke Rockwell (played by Shannon Elizabeth) was the valedictorian of the high school class two years before Eric's class. The summer after Kelso's graduation, she had sex with him at a Molly Hatchet concert in a bathroom stall and got pregnant. Initially, Brooke did not trust Kelso because of his immaturity and did not want him in the child's life. Eventually, Kelso convinced her to give him another chance. Brooke gave birth to their daughter Betsy in 1979. In That 90s Show, her daughter Betsy mentions that she and Kelso were together again for three years while he and Jackie were divorced and Jay had already been born.
- Burt Sigurdson (played by Tom Poston) is Kitty's father. He is often seen avoiding his wife, Bea. In one episode, he bought an ostrich farm, which was right next to a coyote farm. The coyotes ate all the ostriches and the Sigurdsons had to sell the house. Burt died in the driveway on the episode "Your Time is Gonna Come". He is later mentioned in the eighth episode of That 90s Show to have given Kitty beer when she was ten. Kitty claims in the episode "Life Is A Highway" of That 90s Show that he once dipped an empty hot dog bun in ketchup at a barbecue, which her mother referenced on his deathbed, but this is impossible given how he died.
- Caroline "Crazy Caroline" Dupree (played by Allison Munn) was Fez's girlfriend in season 3. Fez quickly learned Caroline is very jealous and paranoid. She made threats against Donna and Jackie because Caroline felt they were going to steal Fez from her, when in fact Jackie and Donna had no intention of doing so. Caroline was once found hiding in the men's bathroom looking for Fez. Fez did not want to be with someone that aggressive and paranoid so he broke up with her. Fez and Caroline were together one last time in the eighth season. She got extremely angry when she found out that Fez had lied to her about Jackie being his roommate, and when she found nude photos of Donna in Fez's Barry White album (Leo hid the nude photos in the album without Fez's knowledge, but Caroline believed they were put there by Fez). Caroline appeared again in "Sheer Heart Attack". Fez was having sex with women once and not seeing them again and then decided that he wanted to be with only one woman, so he called Caroline. Later in the episode, Jackie told Fez that she loved him and then kissed him as Caroline walked in. This, as always, made Caroline angry with Fez and attack him viciously.
- Casey Kelso (played by Luke Wilson) is Kelso's brother who was in the military. Towards the end of season 4 he was dating Donna. During their relationship, there were instances of them engaging in bad behavior, such as Donna drinking and skipping school to hang out with Casey. Donna's father, Bob, felt that Casey was a bad influence and did not want Donna to date him anymore. Eric was jealous of Casey because he wanted to be with Donna, so Eric wanted them to break up. When Red, Kitty and Bob were discussing Casey's bad influence with Donna and Casey, Casey broke up with Donna, deciding the conflict with the adults to be too much hassle. Donna felt that she and Casey were in love, but Casey cruelly said "I have this thing where I say stuff don't really mean." Kelso said that his brother got bored with his girlfriends and broke up with them. During the summer of 1979, Casey was teaching physical education at Eric's old high school, and Eric was in Casey's class. He likes to call Eric "Foreplay". His last appearance was in the Season 7 episode "2120 So. Michigan Ave". He is later mentioned in the finale of the first season of That 90s Show when Donna tells Leia she dated him while broken up with Eric.
- Charlie Richardson (played by Bret Harrison) is the son of one of Red's war buddies. Eric held a grudge against him from the time that he let some sick children win "Eric's" goldfish in an egg toss. Charlie only appeared in about three episodes towards the end of season 7. Before the beginning of season 8, Charlie accidentally fell off the water tower and died. The water tower is named the Charlie Richardson Memorial Water Tower in his honor. The show originally planned to have Charlie stay the entire 8th season as a replacement for Eric, but killed Charlie off because Harrison got an offer to star in The Loop.
- Christine St. George (played by Mary Tyler Moore) is a talk show host of What's Up Wisconsin. In the episode "Sweet Lady", Jackie felt she was destined to be Christine's co-host on the show. She persistently tries to get the job, but Christine St. George makes Jackie her assistant instead. After a few episodes, Jackie was fired for knowing too much about her.
- Earl Arthur (played by Bob Clendenin) is a friend of Red's who worked for Red at Price Mart. Earl frequently came to work late and slacked off on his job, so Red fired him. In response Earl sued Red for wrongful termination, but the judge ruled in favor of Red when Earl arrived too late for his own hearing. Earl later got a job working at a fast food restaurant, where he is again fired for his poor work ethic (this time for repeatedly eating the restaurant's food while at work). Earl appears in the episodes "Red Fired Up", "Roller Disco" and "Radio Daze". In the penultimate episode of the second season of That 90s Show, Earl returns as a member of a men's support group which also includes Mitch. It is mentioned that the last three houses he lived in burned down in fires he may have started. He also implies that he has been in prison for the last twelve years prior. He is one of three characters who were not part of the main cast to make an appearance in That 90s Show.
- Edna Hyde (played by Katey Sagal) is Hyde's biological mother. She is in the season 1 episodes "Career Day", "Prom Night", and "Punk Chick", only appearing on-screen in "Career Day". She plays a large part in "Career Day" as the school chef "Gross Edna", playing opposite Hyde when he has to help her in the kitchen on Career Day. In other episodes she only has lines yelling at Hyde on the porch from the inside of the house such as:
  - In Prom Night Edna: "They're all gonna laugh at you!" (a prom night reference to the 1976 film, Carrie) Steven: "Shut up ma, you're makin' the night too damn special!"
  - In Punk Chick Steven: "It's still my suitcase!" Edna: "Nothing in this house is yours!" Steven: "Shut up!"

Edna then ran off and abandoned Hyde, not heard of again until the 4th season where Hyde claims that she and his stepfather Bud got back together and ran off. After Hyde's abandonment, Kitty prevailed upon Red to let the squalor-ridden Hyde live with the Formans.

- Fenton (played by Jim Rash) is someone with whom Fez has a feud due to a "half-off sale, a crowded parking lot and a pair of pants that made Fez's ass look like an oil painting" (in Fez's own words). In the fifth season, he was an employee at the jewelry store where Eric bought Donna's engagement ring. He is also the landlord of the apartment that Fez and Kelso moved into in the seventh season, which later became Fez and Jackie's apartment when Kelso moved to Chicago. At first, Fenton did not want to let Kelso and Fez move in because of his feud with Fez, but later when he found out Kelso wanted the apartment to have a place to take care of his daughter, and Fenton got the impression that Kelso and Fez were "life partners", he let them have it. Though Fenton does not state this explicitly, his frequent innuendos about men, his lack of experience with women, his mannerisms and affect overtly imply that he is gay. Whenever he sees Fez, he says "Oh, it's you" in a contemptuous way. Neither Fenton nor Fez specifically explain the reason for their mutual hostility and dislike to Eric, despite his increasing curiosity. Fenton later becomes good friends with Jackie, who persuades him not to evict Fez and end their feud. However, very shortly thereafter she carelessly floods both their apartment and Fenton's apartment directly underneath after falling asleep while running the bathtub. He returns in the first season finale of That 90s Show, now Sherri's landlord, and reignites his rivalry with Fez. He also mentions that he now owns three houses, a duplex and a Dippin Dots. In the second season finale he returns, no longer Sherri's landlord, working at a pawnshop, and reveals he had to sell his possessions to it after falling on hard times. He is one of three characters who were not part of the main cast to make an appearance in That 90s Show.
- Hilary Robinson (played by Lara Everly) is Fez's co-worker at the salon where Fez works in season 8. Fez tries to impress her by trying to look cool, which instead intimidates her. However, when Jackie explains to her who Fez really is, she falls in love with him. Fez and Hilary date for a few weeks before Hilary suddenly decides to become a nun and leaves Fez.
- Jack Burkhart (played by Paul Kreppel) is the father of Jackie. Jack's imprisonment for bribery and embezzlement causes Jackie to cease being a rich, privileged girl.
- Joanne Stupac (played by Mo Gaffney) is a girlfriend of Bob who appears in seasons 4 and 5. She meets Bob at the supermarket when Bob, unable to cook, was about to buy a dozen TV dinners. Joanne decides to teach Bob to make a meatloaf so he would not have to buy more TV dinners. She does not get along well with Red. When Red and Joanne first meet, they get into an argument about who would cook the meat and who would make the salad. Joanne works at the dog food factory and hires Eric to put coupons in the dog food bags. Eric eventually loses that job after Joanne breaks up with Bob.
- Mitch Miller (played by Seth Green) is a student in the same class as Eric. Mitch has a feud with Fez and publishes a photo in the school newspaper of Fez and Kelso kissing each other. Mitch has a crush on Donna, and the two once went to a wedding. Eric is angered when Mitch embarrasses Donna, and Eric and Mitch agree to fight each other the next day at 5:15 PM. Not wanting to fight, Mitch persuades Eric not to fight by offering him a French-made GI Joe called "GI Jacques". Mitch has a father, Charlie Miller, played by Fred Willard. In the second season of That 90s Show, he is shown to have become the manager of a Hot Topic store, and still be obsessed with Donna and despise Eric. He also is shown to hate Abercrombie & Fitch, and implies he still lives with his mother. He is later shown to head a men's support group, and attempts to reconnect with Donna when she arrives in Point Place. He is one of three characters who were not part of the main cast to make an appearance in That 90s Show.
- Nina Bartell (played by Joanna Canton) is a girlfriend of Fez in season 5 who works with him at the DMV. Fez loses his virginity to her but it goes badly, so she suggests they need to do it more often to get better. It turns out that the reason she's dating Fez was to anger her parents due to him being "different", They break up a while later because Nina thinks he is too needy.
- Officer Kennedy (played by James Avery) is Kelso's training officer when he joins the police force. He appears mostly in the 6th season, playing a straight ace to the bumbling Kelso.
- Pam Burkhart (played by Eve Plumb in season 1 and Brooke Shields in season 6) is the mother of Jackie who was dating Bob Pinciotti in season 6. Once a serious business lady, she flees to Mexico when Jackie's councilman father is arrested for bribery and embezzling $60,000. She returns to try to fix her relationship with Jackie.
- Pam Macy (played by Jennifer Lyons) is a classmate of the main characters of the show. She is mentioned in more episodes than she appears, mostly by Michael Kelso. She appears in the episodes "Prom Night", "Romantic Weekend", and "It's a Wonderful life". In "Prom Night", Michael takes Pam to the prom while temporarily broken up with Jackie. In "Romantic Weekend", Kelso is about to have sex with Pam but is unable to perform, telling his friends "the buffer wouldn't buff." Pam tells the whole school, which causes everyone to tease Kelso.
- Pastor Dave (played by Kevin McDonald), Pastor Dave is the local pastor at the church. He is overly cheerful and (incorrectly) thinks he is "hip cand cool", up to date with the trends. He is often greeted by Eric and his friends with deadpan voices, and they typically just agree with Dave in the hopes he'll go away. Dave is good friends with Kitty, who helps with the church fundraisers, and has an uneasy friendship with Red (mostly because Red is not used to having friends). His friendship with Red seems to have brought out a less-pure side of Dave, as he spends a day with Red watching football and drinking beer, and once even quit the church because he wanted to watch more football on Sundays (later rejoining as the pastor). He appears primarily in season 3 and 4, but has a few cameos in season 2.
- Rhonda Tate (played by Cynthia Lamontagne) Often called "Big Rhonda" by her classmates, she is a recurring character during season 4 as Fez's girlfriend. When she and Fez are stuck in the school during a tornado they are about to have sex, but Rhonda changes her mind when the tornado ends. She breaks up with Fez after she chokes him after he wanted to get to third base, which came from bad advice from Casey Kelso. Like Fez, she loves candy. She treats Eric with relentless contempt but is genuinely fond of Fez. She also physically intimidated tiny Jackie by threatening to wrestle her after Jackie gets rude with her. The episode "It's a Wonderful Life" features an alternate timeline where Rhonda goes to the prom with Eric (in this timeline, Eric and Donna were never in a relationship), and they remain together until he dumps her. Eric mentions that the two only had sex three times. Later in the same episode she is seen at their 10-year reunion but now as a trim, beautiful, and sexy woman. Rhonda claims her new body came from being dumped by Eric, leading her to lose weight using Jane Fonda workout tapes before becoming a fitness instructor herself. She thanks him for this. It is also mentioned in the season 3 episode "Kitty's Birthday" that she was hit by a car but was apparently uninjured.
- Roy Keene (played by Jim Gaffigan) is the kitchen manager of the Holiday Hotel employing Eric, Hyde, and Kelso to work as waiters in the hotel's restaurant during seasons 5 and 6. The character serves as the replacement for Leo, who was written out during season 5. Hyde mentions that Roy is like a father figure since his father abandoned him. Roy has stated that his standards for food service are low, and he goes days without washing his hands. Roy served in the Vietnam War, once describing Eric as "scrawny, but strong... like the Vietcong". He suffers from serious trouble connecting to people. One time, he got the impression a woman was in love with him after she insulted him when he got her some butter, so he hid in her shower to surprise her with flowers. He once mentioned he was living with a woman but moved out when she found out he was living with her in secret. It is revealed in the season 6 episode "A Legal Matter" that he was a police cadet who was kicked out of the police academy for shooting a police horse.
- Samantha Hyde (played by Judy Tylor) is Hyde's wife during season 8. They got married while Hyde was drunk in Las Vegas. The two barely knew each other when they got married. Hyde did not even remember the wedding and did not know he was married until after Samantha came to Point Place to see Hyde. In the episode "My Fairy King", Hyde learned that Samantha was already married to someone else. After this, Hyde and Samantha's relationship ended.
- Schatzi is a Dachshund that Red gave Kitty in an attempt to make her happy. Schatzi was in several episodes of season 5, was absent for all of season 6, then returned for only one episode towards the beginning of season 7. Red claimed that his absence was due to hiding under the house because he was afraid of the garden hose. "Schatzi" is German and means "little treasure" or "darling" (diminutive of "Schatz"). In the eighth episode of That 90s Show, Kitty mentions that they don't have a dog anymore, confirming that Schatzi is either dead or no longer lives with the Formans.
- Steven James "Bud" Hyde Sr. (played by Robert Hays) is Hyde's stepfather. Bud Hyde worked as a bartender and is an alcoholic. Until the end of the 6th season, Hyde thought Bud was his biological father. Bud abandoned Hyde when he was a child and Steven was always angry at Bud for this. They temporarily reconciled in season 3, with Hyde even moving in with him. However, he would leave again at the beginning of season 4 after getting back together with Edna – forcing Hyde to move back to the Forman house. Hyde mentioned that Bud did attempt to get in touch with him again. (Bud was passed out drunk on Hyde's car.)
- Suzy Simpson (played by Alyson Hannigan) appears in two episodes of season 6. She is Kelso's buddy from the police academy who is also attracted to him. Fez has a crush on Suzy and it is because of her that he and Kelso fight after Kelso lies to Fez saying that Suzy has agreed to go on a date with him when really she thinks that she is dating Kelso. However, when Fez reveals that Kelso's having a Baby with another woman and Kelso reveals that Fez is married, she is furious and wants nothing to do with them.
- Timmy Thompson (played by Paul Connor) is an annoying fellow student in the gang who always embarrasses someone with loud comments meant for everyone around to hear, such as:
  - "Heeey, Forman and Donna got a motel room and they're going to do it!"
  - "Heeey, I'm taking off my pants!"
  - "Heeey, Forman's on a date with his mom!"
  - "Heeey, Donna's showed her ass!" (while showing everyone a yearbook photo where Donna mooned the camera).

He only has real dialogue in the episode "Burning Down The House".

- William James "WB" Barnett (played by Tim Reid) is Hyde's biological father. Hyde originally thought Bud Hyde was his biological father until the cliffhanger between the 6th and 7th seasons, where Kitty discovers that Hyde's real father is a man who lives in Milwaukee. Sometimes people call Barnett by his initials, "WB". Barnett is wealthy and owns Grooves, a chain of record stores. Barnett put Hyde in charge of the Point Place record store along with his daughter (and Hyde's half sister), Angie. Barnett is an African American, which Hyde believes explains his "coolness, afro and suspicion of The Man" (it can also be noted that when Hyde asked him who killed Kennedy his father stated "I don't know, because they don't want me to know"). WB's last on-screen appearance is in the first half of the series finale which is the twenty-first episode of the eighth season, "Love of My Life" (WB had already appeared in the fourteenth episode of that season, "Son and Daughter").

== Introduced in That '90s Show ==
- Betsy Kelso (played by Kira Kosarin) is Michael Kelso's daughter with Brooke Rockwell, born at the beginning of season 7. She mainly lived with her mother and grandmother in Chicago, with her father involved in her life. In That 90s Show she is revealed to have been studying abroad in Spain and had returned to Point Place shortly before the events of season 2. She hooks up with Nate after he breaks up with Nikki and gets blown off by Jay, and continues to date him, to Jay's frustration, until Nate eventually breaks it off after some struggle.
- Bunch (played by Jason Mewes) is a stoner, best friend and roommate of Leo's son Sonny, who first appears in the midseason finale of season 2 before becoming a recurring character in the second half. He and Sonny play the same role to the teenagers that Leo played to their parents in the original show.
- Cole Carson (played by Niles Fitch) is a boy who Gwen began hooking up with a month before season 2. He works for Abercrombie & Fitch, and sometimes visits her at her job at Hot Topic. Gwen mentions to Leia that she met him at Applebee's, and wants to make their relationship more serious, which they later do after some doubts from both of them.
- Isaac (played by Raphael Alejandro) is Ozzie's boyfriend in the second half of season 2. They meet at a wrestling convention, and later begin going out after Kitty finds him through the newspaper.
- Sherri Runck (played by Andrea Anders) is the single mother of Gwen and Nate Runck, with different men. Nate's father, named Brian, lives and works in Japan, where he plays baseball and does commercials for adult diapers, as the oldest player on the team, while Gwen's father is a trucker named Otis who sometimes passes through Point Place. She lives in the house next door to Red and Kitty, which she is revealed in the first season finale to be renting from Fenton. She had a tendency to sleep with a lot of men before the show, but has a relationship with Fez in the first season, which she tries to give up to focus on herself. By the second season, they appear to have broken up. She befriends Red and Kitty, and is also shown to have issues with her deceased father.
- Sonny (played by Kevin Smith) is Leo's son, Bunch's roommate and best friend, and a stoner. He first appears in the midseason finale of season 2 before becoming a recurring character in the second half. He and Bunch play the same role to the teenagers that Leo played to their parents in the original show. In his first appearance, he states his full name is Sonny, but he goes by Son, at least to Leo, because it's easier for his stoner father to remember.
- Theo (played by Anthony Turpel) is Nikki's boyfriend in the second half of season 2. He works at The Hub, and he and Nikki share many of the same interests. Nikki is the one who makes the relationship more physical after he is reluctant to. She later breaks up with him after he fights Nate and reveals his immature side.
