= Foto Hut =

The Foto Hut was a photography store chain started in 1972 by Frank Sklar (March 22, 1921 – December 1, 2009) in Pittsburgh, Pennsylvania. The chain eventually went out of business in 2003 because of competition with larger retail corporations such as Walmart and Target and because of the popularity of digital media.

Customers would deliver rolls of film negatives to local Foto Hut stores, then return to collect their finished photographs. The Foto Hut business model included hand delivery of photographic film from franchised retail outlets to a central developing factory and then redelivering processed images to the Foto Hut franchisees. The franchisees also offered camera sales and repair services. The factory was located in an 1881 Victorian Renaissance building on East Carson Street in Pittsburgh. The factory closed abruptly in 2003. Final customers had to wait over a month to receive their photographs.

== In popular culture ==
In That '70s Show the character Leo owns a Foto Hut franchise.

The follow-your-dreams dramedy, Gypsy 83, features a vulnerable goth heroine who works at a Foto Hut in Sandusky, Ohio.
