= Lisa Robin Kelly =

American actress (1970–2013)

- Kelly in Los Angeles, January 1999
- Born: March 5, 1970; Southington, Connecticut, U.S.
- Died: August 15, 2013 (aged 43); Altadena, California, U.S.
- Resting place: Forest Lawn East Cemetery, Weddington, North Carolina
- Education: DePaul University (BFA)
- Occupation: Actress
- Years active: 1992–2012
- Spouse: Robert Joseph Gilliam (m. 2012)

Lisa Robin Kelly (March 5, 1970 – August 15, 2013) was an American actress. She was best known for her role as Laurie Forman on the TV series That '70s Show.

== Early life and education ==
Kelly was born in Southington, Connecticut, and raised there and in Mooresville, North Carolina. Her parents were Thomas Carl Kelly and Linda Diane (née Grimm) Kelly. She earned a BFA in acting from The Theatre School at DePaul University in Chicago in 1992.

== Career ==
Kelly made her debut in the 1992 Married... with Children episode "Kelly Doesn't Live Here Anymore". She appeared again in 1994 in episodes of Silk Stalkings, the X-Files episode "Syzygy" from its third season, and on Charmed in 1999, as well as in direct-to-video and television films such as Amityville Dollhouse, Late Last Night and the theatrical film Jawbreaker.

Kelly played Laurie Forman, the older sister of Eric Forman, on That '70s Show. She abruptly left the show midway through the third season, and her character was written out of the show to "attend beauty school". She returned to the show in the fifth season for four episodes but was replaced with Christina Moore in the sixth season.

== Problems with alcohol and drugs ==
Kelly began to have serious problems with alcohol and drug abuse sometime in 2001. Because of this, her appearances on That '70s Show became less and less frequent, due to her lack of availability to perform. She was ultimately fired at the end of the fifth season. Kelly was replaced by Christina Moore in the same role, and without further explanation, so as not to affect the continuity of the series.

In an interview with ABC News, Kelly admitted that "with That '70s Show I was guilty of a drinking problem, and I ran". Kelly attributed her abuse of alcohol to trauma following a miscarriage.

Likewise, her contracts to act in films and series practically disappeared until her death in 2013. Her last appearance was in the short TV drama SUX2BME, released in 2012 by Outpost Studios.

== Legal issues ==
In August 2010, Kelly was arrested in North Carolina on a charge of driving while impaired. In November 2010, she pleaded guilty and was fined and sentenced to 12 months of unsupervised probation.

On March 31, 2012, Kelly was arrested on a felony charge of corporal injury upon a spouse and was released on $10,000 bail. The charge was based on a complaint filed by her ex-boyfriend, John Michas. She later made public statements saying that she was the one who had been assaulted and denied Michas' claim that she assaulted him. The Los Angeles County District Attorney declined to file charges.

In November 2012, police in Mooresville, North Carolina, arrested the 42-year-old Kelly and her 61-year-old husband, Robert Joseph Gilliam, after responding to a disturbance at their home. Both were charged with assault and released on bond. She later filed for divorce and a restraining order against Gilliam.

On June 23, 2013, Kelly was arrested for a suspected DUI when law enforcement responded to a call about a parked car blocking a lane of traffic on the I-5 freeway. She subsequently failed field sobriety testing.

== Death ==
Days after checking into Pax Rehab House in Altadena, California, Kelly died in her sleep at the facility on August 15, 2013, age 43. On January 3, 2014, the Los Angeles Department of Coroner concluded that her death was due to an accidental unspecified oral "multiple drug intoxication".

== Filmography ==
=== Film ===
Year	Title	Role	Notes
1994	Relentless IV: Ashes to Ashes	Sherrie	Direct-to-video
1995	Payback	Teenage Girl	
1996	Amityville Dollhouse	Dana	Direct-to-video
1997	Performance Anxiety	Laura Kincaid	
1998	The Survivor	Devin	
1999	Kill the Man	Nan	
1999	Jawbreaker	Cheerleader #2	
1999	Clubland	Carla	
2005	The Food Chain: A Hollywood Scarytale	Marilyn	
2012	SUX2BME	Angel	Short film

=== Television ===
Year	Title	Role	Notes
1992	Married... with Children	Carol	Episode: "Kelly Doesn't Live Here Anymore"
1994	Silk Stalkings	Gina Nelson	Episode: "Killer Cop"
1994	Renegade	Debbie	Episode: "Sheriff Reno"
1994	Cries Unheard: The Donna Yaklich Story	Charlie Greenwell's Girlfriend	Television film
1995	Platypus Man	Brandi	Episode: "NYPD Nude"
1995	ABC Afterschool Special	Ashley	Episode: "Fast Forward"
1995	Sisters	Kristy	Episode: "Deceit"
1995	Murphy Brown	Student	Episode: "The Feminine Critique"
1995	Spring Fling!	Jenny	Television film
1995	Terror in the Shadows	Patty	Television film
1996	The X-Files	Terri Roberts	Episode: "Syzygy"
1996	Hope and Gloria	Debbee	Episode: "Sit Down, You're Rockin' the Funicular"
1996	Days of Our Lives	Jill Stevens	26 episodes
1996	Suddenly	Angie	Television film
1997	Married... with Children	Heather Talrico	Episode: "Breaking Up is Easy to Do: Part 1"
1997	Jenny	Real World Actress	Episode: "A Girl's Gotta Live in the Real World"
1997	Alone	Mary Louise	Television film
1998	Poltergeist: The Legacy	Janine Kinsey	Episode: "Hell Hath No Fury"
1998	Fantasy Island	Regina	Episode: "Pilot"
1998	Buddy Faro	Rita Nardo	Episode: "Ain't That a Kick in the Head"
1998	The Net	Lucy	Episode: "Lucy's Life"
1998	Young Hearts Unlimited	Molly	Television film
1998–2003	That '70s Show	Laurie Forman	Main & later recurring role, 50 episodes
1999	Charmed	Daisy	Episode: "Love Hurts"
1999	Late Last Night	Tristan	Television film
2002	Alikes	Krystal	Television film
