= Michael Kelso =

- That '70s Show and That '90s Show character
- First appearance: That '70s Show: "That '70s Pilot"; That '90s Show: "That '90s Pilot" (guest appearance)
- Last appearance: That '70s Show: "Misfire" (as a regular cast member) "That '70s Finale" (guest appearance)
- Created by: Mark Brazill
- Portrayed by: Ashton Kutcher; Joey Hiott (Kelso at 7); Ethan Peck (Kelso at 14)

In-universe information
- Gender: Male
- Occupation: Male underwear model (formerly); Assistant chef (formerly); Waiter (formerly); Police officer (formerly); Playboy bouncer (currently)
- Family: John Kelso (father); Mrs. Kelso (mother); Casey Kelso (brother); Unnamed sister 4 other brothers (unnamed); Bessie (grandmother)
- Significant others: Jackie Burkhart (wife); Laurie Forman (ex-girlfriend); Annette Berkardt (ex-girlfriend); Brooke Rockwell (ex-girlfriend/mother of his child); Angie Barnett (ex-girlfriend); Pam Macy (fling)
- Children: Betsy Kelso; Jay Kelso
- Nationality: American

Michael Christopher Kelso is a fictional character and one of the four male protagonists in Fox's That '70s Show, portrayed by Ashton Kutcher. Described in the series as tall, lanky, and long-haired, Kelso is initially characterized as unintelligent and naïve, although he demonstrates greater maturity after moving to Chicago in the eighth season. Throughout the series, he is portrayed as a stereotypical himbo—an attractive but unintelligent man. Kelso spends much of the series in an on-again, off-again relationship with Jackie Burkhart (Mila Kunis), and remains preoccupied with her following their repeated breakups, a recurring storyline throughout the show.

Despite his perceived lack of intelligence, Kelso is occasionally shown to possess unexpected insight, suggesting that his shortcomings stem more from a lack of motivation than from immaturity. Near the end of the series, his character undergoes significant personal development after he fathers a child from a one-night stand. To the surprise of his friends, Kelso accepts responsibility for his daughter, moving to Chicago to take a job so he can support her and remain close to her.

== Character biography ==
Kelso was first introduced in "That 70s Pilot" as Eric Forman's less intelligent, loudly obnoxious friend who is dating a preppy, younger student, Jackie Burkhart, whom he first met in 1968 playing "Fort." Later in the season, the couple goes through multiple breakups.

To the frustration of his friends, Michael Kelso frequently asserts his intention to break up with Jackie, yet consistently fails to follow through, hoping she will eventually acquiesce to his desires (but instead, Jackie breaks up with him first). Because of her, he misses out on a Todd Rundgren concert, instead spending the evening making out in the back of the Vista Cruiser. As the series progresses, it is later revealed that Kelso cheats on his girlfriend (most notably with Pam Macy and Eric's sister Laurie). At one point, Jackie finds out and banned Kelso from coming to her ski trip, though Michael still attempts to find a way there.

Kelso also unwittingly gets his friends into trouble after driving them around in an apparently stolen car. They were arrested, though Eric's connections with his father got them out of trouble. Eventually, Kelso loses his virginity to Jackie, though they go through a scare that she may be pregnant, which turns out to be a false alarm.

In later episodes, Kelso is given a neglected 1964 Dodge Van by his uncle, which becomes the main focus of his secondary story during seasons 2 and 3. On one occasion, Jackie wishes to decorate the van, resulting in its being temporarily covered in stuffed animals, though all were removed soon after.

The van becomes the gang's main source of transportation on long-distance journeys, such as a "Van Stock" rock concert, and a trip to an ice fishing shack. However, it is at the ice fishing shack where it ultimately meets its fate when it breaks through the ice, and sinks to the bottom of the lake.

Like Eric, Kelso buys his girlfriend Jackie a promise ring to show how important the relationship is to him. However, while Jackie is overjoyed with her ring, Donna becomes unsure of her future with Eric, causing him to break up with her.

The fourth-season premiere episode sees Eric, in a dream sequence, envisioning a possible future with Donna, a woman he has not actually met. In this future, Kelso and Jackie have broken up once again, only to consistently rekindle their relationship for a one-night stand every time they reunite.

Kelso also spends most of that season attempting to pry Eric from his depression, although he abandons Eric to go to Fun Land amusement park in the second episode, only to get lost. A concerned mother attempts to bring him home, but kicks him out of her car after her children's insults provoke him to threaten them. He is left on the side of the road and forced to walk home. Kelso is also elected Snow King at the Snow Prom, much to Jackie's disapproval.

Class Picture is a flashback episode revealing how each of the main characters met. Kelso and Eric's meeting is not explained thoroughly, but it is presumed they simply met in first grade. Forman's first impression of Kelso is remembered as Kelso showing up at the door looking for Eric in 1968 without pants. After a quick reminder, Kelso exclaimed 'My pants!!' before rushing home. It is also revealed he is the only male member of the gang not to have seen Donna's breasts, though she eventually allows him to see them.

Kelso later invents a day which he named 'Prank Day' where he attempts to prank his friends as many times as possible. During the Season 4 finale, Jackie misleadingly believes that Kelso is proposing to her, causing him to decide to run off to California. After meeting up with Donna, who had recently been humiliated by her then boyfriend and Kelso's brother, Casey, they both take off.

When Kelso returns at the beginning of Season 5, he finds out that Jackie has moved on to Steven Hyde, which makes him extremely jealous and he spends the majority of the season trying to get her back. Eventually, Kelso claims to be over Jackie and renews his friendship with Hyde, and begins a relationship with Annette (Jessica Simpson), a girl he had a short relationship with in California.

Jackie, in the same manner as Kelso had, becomes jealous and even goes so far as to yell, "Get off my boyfriend!" when she sees Kelso and Annette kissing. Kelso responded positively to this and began to make a big show of it. Annette leaves him at the school dance, telling him he isn't over Jackie, and Kelso soon realizes that Annette is right. So when Jackie breaks up with Hyde, Kelso does all he can to win her over, even competing with Hyde. However, when Jackie chooses Hyde over him, he respects her decision and even helps to bring the two together again. From then on, Kelso and Jackie share a relationship as friends.

In Season 6, Kelso is the focus of a major plot twist in which he accidentally impregnates a girl named Brooke in a bathroom at a Molly Hatchet concert. Brooke initially does not want Kelso in the baby's life, much to Kelso's relief. However, a pep-talk from Donna causes him to change his mind as he attempts to prove to Brooke he can be a father. In the seventh season, Betsy Kelso, is born. Brooke leaves for Chicago, giving Kelso permission to see Betsy whenever he can.

Kelso becomes a policeman, albeit a bumbling one. He attempts to take his job seriously by growing a mustache and calling himself "Mike," and even going as far as flushing Hyde's marijuana stash down the toilet (in The Circle), but he quickly reverts when Hyde and Fez shave his mustache and made the mustache resemble the mustache Adolf Hitler was famous for. He eventually sets the police academy on fire using a flare gun, but even before then, had broken into the academy and gets his supervisor's squad car stolen by Hyde & Fez.

At the end of Season 7, Kelso drives Jackie to Chicago after her break-up with Hyde. When Hyde follows her there to propose, he finds Kelso naked, wrapped in a towel, making a comment implying that he and Jackie were about to have sex. Although Kelso frequently makes sexual comments to every female on the show, including Jackie and Donna, Hyde believes the two really were about to engage in sex, and drives off to Las Vegas, effectively ending his relationship with Jackie.

Ashton Kutcher did not renew his contract for the eighth and final season of the series but he appeared in a recurring guest role in the first four episodes of season 8 in order to bring closure to the character.

The series begins with Kelso avoiding Hyde after he catches him about to have sex with Jackie in a motel room. When Hyde finally catches Kelso, he punches him in the face and then decides to resume their friendship. With this storyline resolved and the end of Hyde and Jackie's relationship, Kelso resumes his police work duties. However, when Randy and Fez decide to throw a bachelor party for Hyde after his marriage to a stripper, Kelso is fired due to misuse of police equipment and unprofessional behavior.

This causes Kelso to wonder what he has going for him and decides that Jackie is the one for him all along. He decides to propose to Jackie, seeing as she was the one, he has always loved. He later rethinks this decision, deciding against it after a job offer is given to him. However, Fez had already told Jackie about his plans. Feeling pressured to do something, and scared that he might lose all his future chances with Jackie, he attempts to propose, albeit with a balloon (which is how Jackie wants to be proposed to), at the Forman's anniversary, but Jackie says no, much to Kelso's relief. They both decide they have a lot of maturing to do, many things to take care of in their own lives and, even though they both admit to loving each other, agree that it is not the right time to get married. He then joins his friends for one final circle before his departure. Kelso does not appear in succeeding episodes, although he is occasionally referenced by the remaining characters. He returns, though, in the series finale to welcome in the New Year with his friends, much to their pleasure.

The Fox Network announced on April 4, 2012, that Ashton Kutcher as well as other cast members of That '70s Show had signed on to reprise their roles for a special Fox 25th anniversary reunion special. The episode aired on April 22, 2012, as part of a two-hour special. The cast reflected on the show after 100 episodes.

In the sequel series That '90s Show, set in 1995, Kelso and Jackie are shown to be back together and have both a teenage son named Jay and a teenage daughter named Betsy and are about to marry for the third time.

=== Personality ===
Among Kelso's most famous personality traits are conceit and sheer stupidity, performing a great number of idiocies on a regular daily basis. Despite his stupid nature, he shows moments of shining intellect, demonstrating the ability to do fast mathematical division and fixing Red's Pong machine. During a flashback scene, it is implied that Kelso used to be a bookish, motivated student until Hyde introduced him and Eric to marijuana when they were in junior high.

Throughout the series, Kelso has made a large quantity of moronic quotes and performed many dimwitted blunders, and possesses numerous infantile qualities such as enjoying Christmas specials deemed childish by his peers and fussing when something is preventing him from viewing them. It also been hinted Kelso loves dogs.

Like the other teenage male central characters of the series, Kelso also possesses an abundance of "horny" personality traits and appears especially fond of the idea of having sexual relations and the willingness to spoil his virginity results in the impregnation of a librarian named Brooke and the birth of a little girl named Betsy toward the end of the series. He fancies himself as quite attractive and capable of winning the affections of women such as Jackie Burkhart, with whom he has shared an on-again/off-again relationship throughout the course of the series. Kelso also likes bands such as Led Zeppelin, Foghat, Deep Purple, Aerosmith, Kiss, Ted Nugent, Pink Floyd, AC/DC, The Rolling Stones, The Who and Molly Hatchet. It is revealed in the Halloween special that Kelso is a year older than the other teenagers due to being held back a year in the first grade, which angers Hyde knowing that all along Kelso is legally allowed to purchase beer for the teenagers.

It is clear from Jackie and Kelso's relationship that Kelso definitely is not the one wearing the pants in his relationships; he is easily manipulated (Laurie pointed this out once and called him a "tool") and never fulfills his promise of breaking up with his girlfriend, although later it may simply be because he is afraid to break a woman's heart. When he dates Annette in Season 5, he even remarks "It's good to be under someone's thumb again!" with a grin, suggesting he prefers his women to be controlling. After uttering this line, Fez asks him, "What did your mother do to you?" which Kelso answers with a stupid grin. In the Season 2 episode "Kelso's Serenade," he says, "I wish Jackie was still controlling me, I love being on a short leash."

Kelso often remarks that he has an entire future planned out for him. He says this several times in the third and fourth season. This was apparently a way to convince others he was mature, but his friends viewed it as boastful and annoying. Kelso's only plan was to coast through his life on his good looks, and when he believes this might not happen, he greatly overreacts. He also has fallen off the water tower every year since Jr. High, a fact either explaining or explained by his idiocy.

Kelso is naive and simple-minded compared to his other friends. Also, Fez describes him as being delicate and sensitive. However, as the series progresses, a slight growth and maturity can be seen in his character. It is revealed in the episode "Over the Hills and Far Away" that his stupidity was a result of being dropped on his head as a kid. This easily upsets him because everyone else had the grace to never mention it.

=== Family ===
Kelso's family is frequently referred to by other characters as being a large one, despite only one of his siblings, Casey, actually appearing on-screen throughout the show's run. Some episodes portray his household as loud and obnoxious, such as when he opens the door, yelling can be heard. From the characters' dialogue, it can be assumed he is one of six Kelso boys and also has a younger sister, who Hyde implies to be fairly unattractive. In "That 90s Show", Kelso's son Jay mentions that he has an aunt named Lisa. Since his mother is an only child, it is presumed that Lisa is the name of Kelso's sister. In another episode of "That 90s Show", Jay mentions an "Uncle Ron", implying one of Kelso's brothers has this name.

One grandmother, mentioned in the episode Dine and Dash, has, in Kelso's words, "honkin' whiskers." Despite Kelso's protests that his own mom is very beautiful, Jackie insists she too has the same whiskers then calls her "whisker face."

Kelso's father, John Kelso, appeared in the episode Career Day, portrayed by Francis Guinan. John Kelso's office job as a "Senior Executive Statistical Analysis Technician" is unclear and confusing to Michael, who decides to make it up and say his dad is a farmer.

== Reception ==
Kelso is considered by many fans as the breakout character of the series. In the earlier seasons he was a supporting main character but in seasons 6-7 he becomes one of the shows leads along with Eric, Donna and Hyde. Kelso was also described by TV Guide's as one of 'TVs Most Lovable Lunkheads.'

== Other appearances ==
- Kelso was portrayed once again by Ashton Kutcher in a Robot Chicken sketch entitled "That '00s Show".
- Critics have noted striking similarities to the portrayal of Kutcher's character Walden Schmidt on Two and a Half Men to that of Kelso. Walden's personality, however, drastically changed since his initial appearances and by the series' end he was a completely changed man. Other similarities drawn are between that of his role as Jesse Montgomery III in the stoner film Dude, Where's My Car? (2000).
