= Fez (That '70s Show) =

- That 70's Show character
- First appearance: "That '70s Pilot" (episode 1.01)
- Last appearance: "That '70s Finale" (episode 8.22); That '90s Show: "Kids in America" (episode 1.10)
- Created by: Mark Brazill
- Portrayed by: Wilmer Valderrama

In-universe information
- Nicknames: The Foreign Kid, The Foreigner
- Gender: Male
- Occupation: Foto Hut clerk (formerly); DMV clerk (formerly); Shampoo boy
- Family: Rebecca Erdman (host mother); Matthew Erdman (host father); Red Forman (ex-father-in-law); Kitty Forman (ex-mother-in-law); Eric Forman (ex-brother-in-law)
- Spouse: Laurie Forman (ex-wife)
- Significant others: Sherri Runck (girlfriend); Caroline Dupree (ex-girlfriend); Nina Bartell (ex-girlfriend); Danielle (ex-girlfriend); Patty (ex-girlfriend); Big Rhonda (ex-girlfriend); Hillary (ex-girlfriend); Jackie Burkhart (ex-girlfriend)
- Nationality: Unknown

Fez is a fictional character and one of the male leads on the Fox Network's That '70s Show, also appearing in a recurring guest role in the Netflix sequel That '90s Show portrayed by Wilmer Valderrama. He was the foreign exchange student of indeterminate nationality in a group of six local teenagers.

== Origins ==
Fez was born on August 4, 1960. His real name is deemed unpronounceable by his friends, so they call him "Fez" (a homophone of "FES", an acronym for foreign exchange student). The series' official web site explains the spelling "Fez", as opposed to "Fes", as "poetic license".

Fez's country of origin being undeclared on screen is one of the longest running gags on the show.
