= Philip Stark =

American screenwriter

- Born: Houston, Texas, U.S.
- Occupation(s): Writer, therapist

Philip Stark is an American television and film screenwriter, author, and therapist. A native of Houston, Texas, Stark graduated with a degree in Radio-Television-Film (RTF) from The University of Texas at Austin in 1995.

He is best known for his film Dude, Where's My Car? from 2000, and he wrote the script for a sequel, Seriously Dude, Where's My Car?, which did not make it into production. Prior to this, he was a writer and script editor for That '70s Show and he has also written for South Park. He was also the co-creator of Dog with a Blog.

When he did not experience further success as a screenwriter, Stark went back to school, graduating from Antioch University with a Master's degree in Psychology, and is currently seeing talk therapy clients in private practice. He is also the author of a book on talk therapy, "Dude, Where's My Car-tharsis?"

In 2000, along with his friend, animator Graham Robertson, Stark created the online cartoon parody of the Budweiser "Whassup?" commercial featuring clips from the Super Friends.
