= Laura Prepon =

American actress (born 1980)

- Prepon in 2026
- Born: March 7, 1980 (age 46); Watchung, New Jersey, U.S.
- Occupations: Actress; director
- Years active: 1997–present
- Spouse: Ben Foster (m. 2018; sep. 2024)
- Children: 2
- Relatives: Joseph Bradford Carr (3rd great-grandfather); Jon Foster (ex-brother-in-law)

Laura Prepon (/ˈpriːpɒn/ PREE-pon; born March 7, 1980) is an American actress and television director. She rose to fame with her role as Donna Pinciotti in the Fox sitcom That '70s Show (1998–2006). She is also known for portraying Alex Vause in the Netflix comedy-drama series Orange Is the New Black (2013–2019). Prepon made her film debut in 2001 with the independent drama Southlander. Her other films include the romantic drama Come Early Morning (2006), the comedy Lay the Favorite (2012), the thriller The Girl on the Train (2016), and the drama The Hero (2017).

== Early life and education ==
Prepon was born in Watchung, New Jersey. She is the youngest of five children of Marjorie (née Coll), a high school teacher and gourmet home chef, and Michael Prepon, an orthopedic surgeon. Her father was Jewish, of Eastern European Jewish descent, and her mother has mostly Irish Catholic ancestry. Her paternal grandfather, Louis Prepon, was from a town in present-day Ukraine that, over different periods, was part of the Russian Empire and Poland. Her maternal 3rd great-grandfather was Union Army General Joseph Bradford Carr. Prepon has said she had an interfaith upbringing, observing both Jewish and Catholic religious traditions.

In 1993, when Prepon was thirteen years old, her father died while undergoing open-heart surgery at age 49. She attended Watchung Hills Regional High School until she was 15, then studied at the Total Theatre Lab in New York City.

== Career ==
=== 1995–2005 ===
Prepon appeared in plays such as A Woman of Property and Ascension Day while in New York. In 1996, she studied drama with acting teacher Caroline Thomas at Thomas' Total Theatre Lab. Later, in September 1997, she premiered on a Levi Strauss-developed show called They Go On, an Internet-based soap opera. Prepon had also worked as a model and has done photo shoots in Paris, Milan, and Brazil.

Prepon starred as Donna Pinciotti on the Fox sitcom That '70s Show from 1998 to 2006. Donna became the girlfriend and next-door neighbor of Eric Forman (Topher Grace). Randy Pearson (Josh Meyers), who was introduced in the eighth and final season of the series, became Donna's third love interest after Grace left the series. Prepon attended film school while she worked on That '70s Show.

Prepon co-starred in the college comedy Slackers (2002), about three best friends who are blackmailed for cheating their way through college. She was nominated for a Teen Choice Award in 2002 for her role in That '70s Show. In 2001, she made her film debut in Steve Hanft's musical comedy-drama Southlander with Beck, Beth Orton and Hank Williams III, where she played Seven=Five, a young TV telepathic. In 2004, Prepon worked on the independent drama film The Pornographer: A Love Story. The film tells the story of an obsessive relationship between a director and an actress.

Prepon was named one of Stuff magazine's "102 Sexiest Women in the World" in 2002 and one of Maxim magazine's "Hot 100" in 2005. Prepon had a cameo voice appearance as a United Nations Space Command marine in Halo 2, which was released in 2004. Her first notable film role came in 2004 with the dark drama Lightning Bug with Bret Harrison, Kevin Gage and Ashley Laurence. Branching into other arenas than acting, Prepon also served as executive producer of the film. She also appeared on an episode of MTV's Cribs in 2003.

=== 2005–2010 ===
In 2006, Prepon co-starred with Misha Collins in the psychological thriller Karla, based on the true story of Paul Bernardo and his wife Karla Homolka, a Canadian couple who kidnapped, sexually abused, and murdered three girls, marking a contrast to her usual lighthearted roles. She was also an executive producer of E! Hollywood Hold'em the same year.

Prepon co-starred with Bryan Greenberg as Hannah Daniels in the ABC drama October Road, which debuted March 15, 2007. The show was canceled by ABC on May 12, 2008, despite strong ratings and a grassroots campaign from the show's fanbase to keep the show alive. In April 2007, she starred in a dramatic short film Once Upon a Time. She also appeared in the 2005 Oxygen romantic comedy Romancing the Bride. She also was the original voice for Hayley Smith on the Fox animated sitcom American Dad! and voiced her in an unaired pilot. She appeared as Lauren, the long-lost sister of Mary Shannon (Mary McCormack) in the USA Network mystery drama In Plain Sight in the episode "A Frond in Need.”

On February 5, 2010, it was announced that Prepon signed on to star in Awkward Situations for Men, a pilot on ABC. In 2009, Prepon appeared in the CBS sitcom How I Met Your Mother as Karen, one of the girlfriends of Ted Mosby (Josh Radnor), in the episode "Sorry, Bro." She reprised her role in the episodes "The Front Porch" in 2009 and "Say Cheese" in 2010. She also appeared in the Fox medical drama House M.D. in the episode "Private Lives."

Prepon had been taking directing classes at the Art Center College of Design. She directed a short film, Abide with Me, about a 10-year-old boy who, "upon bearing witness to his father's murder, is rendered mute". Prepon stated she plans on making Abide with Me into a feature film.

=== 2011–present ===
In early 2011, Prepon guest-starred in an episode of the ABC police procedural drama Castle as an actress studying for the role of Nikki Heat, a character created by Nathan Fillion's title character. Prepon had been working on a web series, Neighbros, which she directed and edited, starring her then-boyfriend Scott Michael Foster. They had sold the series to Comedy Central. In February 2011, she was cast as the title character Chelsea Newman on the NBC sitcom Are You There, Chelsea?, based on Chelsea Handler's 2008 book Are You There, Vodka? It's Me, Chelsea. NBC premiered the show on January 11, 2012, and canceled it on May 11, 2012. She guest-starred in the TBS sitcom Men at Work.

In mid-2012, Prepon signed on to co-star with Taylor Schilling in the Netflix original comedy-drama series Orange Is the New Black, based on Piper Kerman's 2010 memoir Orange Is the New Black: My Year in a Women's Prison. She was cast as Alex Vause, a former drug importer and girlfriend of Piper Chapman (Schilling). The series premiered on July 11, 2013. Prepon was a regular in the first season, but appeared in only four of the 13 episodes in the second season. She returned as a series regular in the third season.

In 2016, Prepon and nutritionist Elizabeth Troy co-wrote The Stash Plan, a wellness book that draws on Prepon's experiences eating organic foods since she was a child, and her struggles with weight, low energy, and digestive issues. The book debuted at No. 10 under "Advice, How-To & Miscellaneous" on The New York Times Best Seller list. Since publishing The Stash Plan, Prepon has expanded her cooking career, launching a line of kitchenware products called PrepOn Kitchen and regularly posting instructional videos online.

In 2016, Prepon appeared in the psychological thriller The Girl on the Train, based on Paula Hawkins' novel of the same name. In 2017, she played Charlotte opposite Sam Elliott in The Hero. Prepon directed the tenth episode of Orange Is the New Black's fifth season, titled "The Reverse Midas Touch.” On April 30, 2022, it was announced that Prepon would have a guest appearance in the follow-up sitcom, That '90s Show. That 90's Show debuted January 19, 2023 on Netflix.

== Personal life ==
Prepon was in a relationship with Christopher Masterson from 1999 to 2007. She later dated Scott Michael Foster for several years, but said in 2013 they had broken up.

In 2017, Prepon gave birth to a daughter with fiancé actor Ben Foster. Prepon and Foster married in June 2018. Their second child, a son, was born in 2020. Foster filed for divorce from Prepon on November 12, 2024, citing “irreconcilable differences.”

Prepon became a Scientologist in 1999. In 2021, she revealed that she had not practiced Scientology since 2016 and it was no longer a part of her life.

== Filmography ==
=== Film ===
Year	Title	Role	Notes
1998	Pleasantville	Extra	
2001	Southlander	Seven Equals Five	
2002	Slackers	Reanna Cass	
2004	Lightning Bug	Angevin Duvet	Also executive producer
2004	The Pornographer: A Love Story		
2006	Karla	Karla Homolka	
2006	Come Early Morning	Kim	
2007	Once Upon a Time	The Witch	Short film
2007	The Chosen One	Rachel Cruz (voice)	
2012	Lay the Favorite	Holly	
2012	The Kitchen	Jennifer	
2016	The Girl on the Train	Cathy	
2017	The Hero	Charlotte Dylan	

=== Television ===
Year	Title	Role	Notes
1998–2006	That '70s Show	Donna Pinciotti	Main role; 200 episodes
2004	King of the Hill	April (voice)	Episode: "Talking Shop"
2005	American Dad!	Hayley Smith (voice)	Unaired pilot
2005	Romancing the Bride	Melissa	Television film
2007–2008	October Road	Hannah Jane Daniels	Main role; 19 episodes
2009–2010	How I Met Your Mother	Karen	Guest role; 3 episodes, seasons 4 and 5
2009	In Plain Sight	Lauren Hefferman	Episode: "A Frond in Need"
2010	House	Frankie	Episode: "Private Lives"
2010	Celebrity Ghost Stories	Herself	Episode #2.9
2011	Castle	Natalie Rhodes/Nikki Heat	Episode: "Nikki Heat"
2011	Love Bites	Alex	Episode: "Keep on Truckin'"
2011	The Killing Game	Eve Duncan	Television film
2011	Neighbros	L Boogie	Web series; director and editor
2012	Are You There, Chelsea?	Chelsea Newman	Main role; 12 episodes
2012	Men at Work	Hannah	Episode: "Plan B"
2013–2019	Orange Is the New Black	Alex Vause	Main role (season 1, 3–7), recurring role (season 2); 82 episodes Directed season 5, episode 10: "The Reverse Midas Touch", season 6, episode 11: "Well This Took a Dark Turn", season 7, episode 5: "Minority Deport"
2023–2024	That '90s Show	Donna Pinciotti-Forman	Guest role (7 episodes) Director (10 episodes)

== Awards and nominations ==
Year	Organization	Category	Work	Result	Ref
1999	Young Artist Award	Best Performance in a TV Series – Young Ensemble	That '70s Show	Nominated	
1999	Teen Choice Awards	TV – Breakout Performance	That '70s Show	Nominated	
2002	Teen Choice Awards	TV – Choice Actress, Comedy	That '70s Show	Nominated	
2014	Satellite Awards	Best Supporting Actress – Series, Miniseries or Television Film	Orange Is the New Black	Won	
2014	Satellite Awards	Best Cast – Television Series	Orange Is the New Black	Won	
2016	Screen Actors Guild Awards	Outstanding Performance by an Ensemble in a Comedy Series	Orange Is the New Black	Won	
2017	Screen Actors Guild Awards	Outstanding Performance by an Ensemble in a Comedy Series	Orange Is the New Black	Won	
2017	The Creative Coalition Spotlight Initiative Awards	—N/a	—N/a	Won	
