= How I Met Your Mother season 4 =

How I Met Your Mother
- Season 4
- The Awesome Season 4 DVD cover art
- Starring: Josh Radnor; Jason Segel; Cobie Smulders; Neil Patrick Harris; Alyson Hannigan
- No. of episodes: 24

Release
- Original network: CBS
- Original release: September 22, 2008 – May 18, 2009

Season chronology
- ← Previous; Season 3 Next → Season 5

The fourth season of the American television comedy series How I Met Your Mother premiered on September 22, 2008 and concluded on May 18, 2009. It consisted of 24 episodes, each running approximately 22 minutes in length. CBS broadcast the fourth season on Monday nights at 8:30 pm in the United States. The complete fourth season was released on Region 1 DVD on September 29, 2009. In the United Kingdom it aired on E4.

The fourth season is the only season of How I Met Your Mother to be nominated for the Primetime Emmy Award for Outstanding Comedy Series.

== Cast ==
=== Main cast ===
- Josh Radnor as Ted Mosby
- Jason Segel as Marshall Eriksen
- Cobie Smulders as Robin Scherbatsky
- Neil Patrick Harris as Barney Stinson
- Alyson Hannigan as Lily Aldrin
- Bob Saget (uncredited) as Future Ted Mosby (voice only)

=== Recurring cast ===
- Sarah Chalke as Stella Zinman
- Lyndsy Fonseca as Penny, Ted's Daughter
- David Henrie as Luke, Ted's Son
- Charlene Amoia as Wendy the Waitress
- Bryan Callen as Bilson
- Jason Jones as Tony Grafanello
- Darcy Rose Byrnes as Lucy Zinman
- Marshall Manesh as Ranjit
- Joe Nieves as Carl, the owner of MacLarens Pub
- Matt Boren as Stuart

=== Guest cast ===
- Regis Philbin as himself
- Bill Fagerbakke as Marvin Eriksen, Sr.
- David Burtka as Scooter
- Frances Conroy as Loretta Stinson
- Erin Cahill as Heather Mosby
- Brooke D'Orsay as Margaret (Betty - Barney's Wife)
- Laura Prepon as Karen
- Kendra Wilkinson as herself
- Kevin Michael Richardson as Stan
- Heidi Montag as herself
- Spencer Pratt as himself
- Kim Kardashian as herself
- Will Sasso as Doug Martin

== Episodes ==
Season four episodes
| No. overall | No. in season | Title | Directed by | Written by | Original release date | Prod. code | US viewers (millions) |
|---|---|---|---|---|---|---|---|
| 65 | 1 | "Do I Know You?" | Pamela Fryman | Carter Bays & Craig Thomas | September 22, 2008 | 4ALH01 | 9.79 |
As Stella finally gives Ted an answer on his proposal, Barney realizes that he may be in love with Robin.
| 66 | 2 | "The Best Burger in New York" | Pamela Fryman | Carter Bays & Craig Thomas | September 29, 2008 | 4ALH02 | 8.72 |
Barney, Lily, Regis Philbin, Robin, Marshall and Ted set out on a mission to find the restaurant in which Marshall ate his first New York burger.
| 67 | 3 | "I Heart NJ" | Pamela Fryman | Greg Malins | October 6, 2008 | 4ALH04 | 8.98 |
Ted invites the gang to Stella's house in New Jersey. Stella shocks him by announcing that she wants to live there permanently once they marry.
| 68 | 4 | "Intervention" | Michael Shea | Stephen Lloyd | October 13, 2008 | 4ALH03 | 9.25 |
Ted insists that his friends attend an intervention after learning that they had previously ditched one for his engagement to Stella.
| 69 | 5 | "Shelter Island" | Pamela Fryman | Chris Harris | October 20, 2008 | 4ALH05 | 9.45 |
Ted and Stella make the decision to get married in three days. So when the day comes, it turns out to not be all they had imagined because of the presence of their exes.
| 70 | 6 | "Happily Ever After" | Pamela Fryman | Jamie Rhonheimer | November 3, 2008 | 4ALH06 | 9.40 |
When Ted unexpectedly runs into someone from his past whom he would rather forget, the gang starts wondering how they would handle it, if it happened to them.
| 71 | 7 | "Not a Father's Day" | Pamela Fryman | Robia Rashid | November 10, 2008 | 4ALH07 | 9.79 |
Lily and Marshall receive different views on whether they should have a baby. When Lily asks, Ted and Marshall turn to Robin for advice. Barney creates his own holiday for single men.
| 72 | 8 | "Woooo!" | Pamela Fryman | Carter Bays & Craig Thomas | November 17, 2008 | 4ALH09 | 9.99 |
A depressed Robin joins a group of overindulging single party girls known as the "Woo Girls." Meanwhile, Barney receives a submission for design of the new company headquarters from Ted.
| 73 | 9 | "The Naked Man" | Pamela Fryman | Joe Kelly | November 24, 2008 | 4ALH08 | 9.96 |
Ted walks into his apartment to find Robin's date sitting naked on his couch. He learns about a technique that could revolutionize dating for the whole group, and everyone thinks about whether or not they should try it out that night.
| 74 | 10 | "The Fight" | Pamela Fryman | Theresa Mulligan Rosenthal | December 8, 2008 | 4ALH10 | 10.49 |
Ted tries to prove to the gang that he's not a loser after being left at the altar. Meanwhile, Barney and Ted decide to pick a fight with the guys sitting in their favorite booth to impress Robin. Robin gets turned on by the fighting.
| 75 | 11 | "Little Minnesota" | Pamela Fryman | Chuck Tatham | December 15, 2008 | 4ALH12 | 11.37 |
It is Christmas time and Ted's younger sister, Heather, comes for a visit; meanwhile, Marshall introduces Robin to her first theme bar.
| 76 | 12 | "Benefits" | Pamela Fryman | Kourtney Kang | January 12, 2009 | 4ALH11 | 11.76 |
When Ted and Robin decide to be "friends with benefits" to end conflicts around the apartment, Barney tries to fix their problems so they will stop sleeping with each other.
| 77 | 13 | "Three Days of Snow" | Pamela Fryman | Matt Kuhn | January 19, 2009 | 4ALH13 | 10.69 |
Lily comes back from a trip to Seattle only to run into a blizzard, which may threaten an airport ritual of meeting Marshall. Meanwhile, Ted & Barney offer to keep watch over the bar at MacLaren's while awaiting their dates, since Carl wants to close up early.
| 78 | 14 | "The Possimpible" | Pamela Fryman | Jonathan Groff | February 2, 2009 | 4ALH14 | 10.31 |
Robin discovers she must find employment within seven days or be deported back to Canada, and agrees to create a video resume with Barney's help.
| 79 | 15 | "The Stinsons" | Pamela Fryman | Carter Bays & Craig Thomas | March 2, 2009 | 4ALH15 | 11.09 |
The gang suspect Barney has a girlfriend after he suddenly leaves MacLaren's but realizes he has a wife and a son.
| 80 | 16 | "Sorry, Bro" | Pamela Fryman | Craig Gerard & Matthew Zinman | March 9, 2009 | 4ALH16 | 8.68 |
When Lily and Marshall get wind of the fact that Ted's college girlfriend Karen (Laura Prepon), who they always hated, has moved to New York, they try to persuade him not to contact her.
| 81 | 17 | "The Front Porch" | Rob Greenberg | Chris Harris | March 16, 2009 | 4ALH17 | 9.29 |
When Karen comes across another woman's earring in Ted's bed, he learns that Lily put it there on purpose. Ted discovers this isn't the first time she's covertly meddled in his relationships.
| 82 | 18 | "Old King Clancy" | Pamela Fryman | Jamie Rhonheimer | March 23, 2009 | 4ALH19 | 7.36 |
As a means of protecting Ted from discovering he has lost an important job, Marshall and Barney dream up an elaborate lie.
| 83 | 19 | "Murtaugh" | Pamela Fryman | Joe Kelly | March 30, 2009 | 4ALH18 | 9.20 |
When Barney learns Ted has a list of things he thinks the gang is too old to do, he sets out to do every task within 24 hours in order to prove Ted wrong.
| 84 | 20 | "Mosbius Designs" | Pamela Fryman | Kourtney Kang | April 13, 2009 | 4ALH20 | 9.60 |
When Ted loses his job and decides to form his own architectural firm out of his apartment, he hires an intern to help get his company off the ground, but the intern gets too close for comfort with some of Ted's friends. Meanwhile, Marshall tries to make himself more valuable at work with a gimmick.
| 85 | 21 | "The Three Days Rule" | Pamela Fryman | Greg Malins | April 27, 2009 | 4ALH22 | 8.87 |
When Ted breaks Barney and Marshall's "three-days rule" by having a "text" relationship with a girl he just met, they play a cruel joke on him by pretending to be her.
| 86 | 22 | "Right Place, Right Time" | Pamela Fryman | Stephen Lloyd | May 4, 2009 | 4ALH21 | 8.89 |
Ted explains to his future children how important it is to be in the right place at the right time. Meanwhile, Barney celebrates his 200th conquest.
| 87 | 23 | "As Fast as She Can" | Pamela Fryman | Carter Bays & Craig Thomas | May 11, 2009 | 4ALH23 | 8.78 |
Tony, Stella's fiancé, makes an attempt to ease the burden he feels for "ruining Ted's life," by helping him find a job. Meanwhile, Barney wants to prove that he can get out of a speeding ticket.
| 88 | 24 | "The Leap" | Pamela Fryman | Carter Bays & Craig Thomas | May 18, 2009 | 4ALH24 | 8.73 |
Ted is trying to keep his architecture firm afloat by working all night, but Marshall tries to lure him to the roof for a surprise 31st birthday party. Robin finally learns about Barney's secret feelings for her.

=== U.S. viewership ===
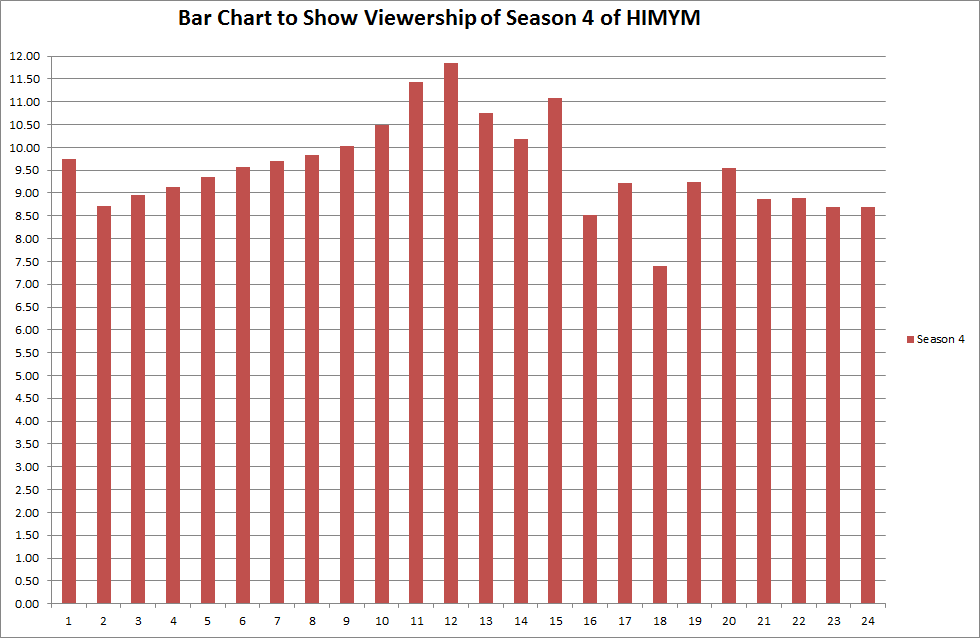
Episodic Viewership of Season 4

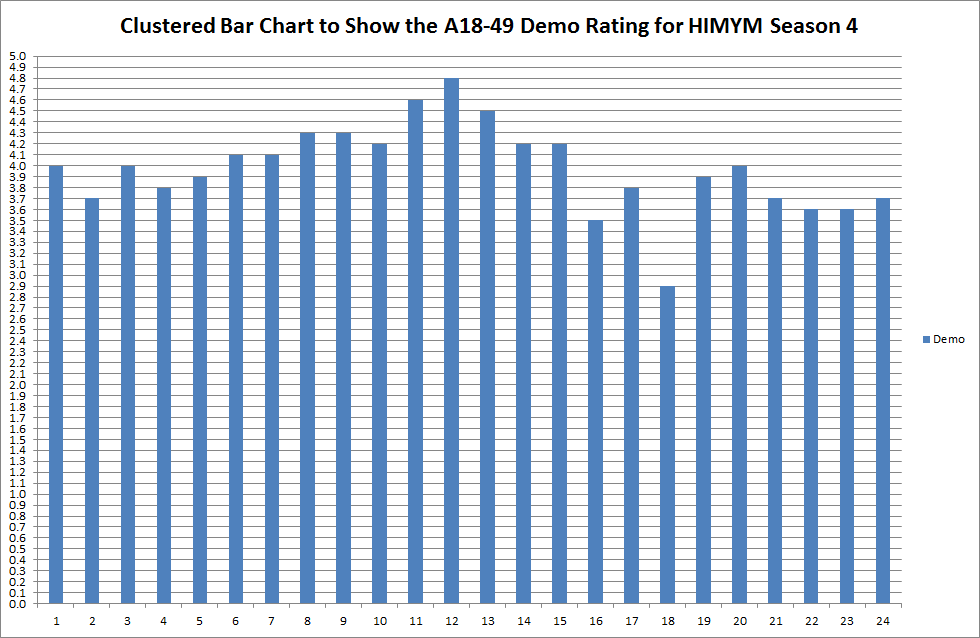
Episodic Demo Ratings of Season 4

Viewership and Demo Rating for Season 4 episodes

This season is currently the second highest rated season of How I Met Your Mother in terms of viewership, at an average of 9.42 million viewers. However, it is currently the highest rated in terms of the important Adults 18–49 demographic, which is what advertisers use to determine how much a 30-second advertising spot costs. Season 4 averaged 4.0/10 in terms of rating/share in the Adults 18–49 demographic.

== Critical response ==
Season 4 received highly positive reviews and is often considered to be the best season of the series. Michelle Zoromski of IGN gave Season 4 an overall rating of 8.5 out of 10. Michelle stated, "This fourth season seemed to settle down the chase for the titular mother. While Ted was busy dating Stella, the gang settled into many stand alone episodes which were every bit as entertaining as episodes devoted to Ted's love life," later going on to say, "A stellar Robin-Marshall episode, titled "Little Minnesota," makes it clear that these two do not get enough screen time together. With Robin homesick and unemployed (and at risk of being deported), this pairing brought out the best Robin Sparkles reference of the season, when Marshall leads a rousing karaoke version of "Let's Go to the Mall!"
