= The Fight (How I Met Your Mother) =

- How I Met Your Mother episode
- Episode no.: Season 4 Episode 10
- Directed by: Pamela Fryman
- Written by: Theresa Mulligan Rosenthal
- Production code: 4ALH10
- Original air date: December 8, 2008

Guest appearance
- Will Sasso as Doug Martin

Episode chronology
← Previous "The Naked Man"	Next → "Little Minnesota"
- How I Met Your Mother season 4

"The Fight" is the tenth episode in the fourth season of the television series How I Met Your Mother, and the 74th episode overall. It originally aired on December 8, 2008.

== Plot ==
A bartender, Doug, gets Ted and Barney involved in a fight with a group of guys sitting in the gang's favorite booth. Marshall and Lily try to warn them off, but Barney vows to join in when Robin reveals that she is turned on by violence. Ted joins in as he thinks it is an experience he should have sometime in his life.

When they arrive in the back alley, Doug has already knocked out the guys single-handedly. Ted and Barney try to give him credit, but he insists they were in the fight as well. Afraid of appearing unmasculine, they take the credit after Barney creates "battle wounds" by blackening his own eye and punching Ted in the nose. They earn the admiration of everyone except Marshall, who claims that he used to fight with his brothers and Ted and Barney would never have stood a chance in their fights. Robin, Ted and Barney laugh Marshall off, believing his fights with his brothers to be childish horseplay.

When Ted and Barney are sued by the losers of the fight, they admit to Marshall and the girls that they had no role in the victory. Marshall gets the two out of the lawsuit with their admission of no involvement; this leaves Doug now the only person named in the suit. When Doug plans to pulverize Ted and Barney for their betrayal in the alley behind MacLaren's, Barney runs away in fear. Ted tries to leave, until Doug brings up Stella leaving him and Ted punches Doug, who subsequently knocks Ted out cold in retaliation. Marshall proves his earlier stories of fighting prowess by knocking out Doug with one blow; as it turns out his childhood fights with his brothers weren't childish horseplay as Robin, Ted and Barney believed, but very violent brawls. Barney returns to find both Doug and Ted on the ground in pain.

At school, Lily struggles with two boys in her class who are also fighting. First, she has Marshall come to class to preach pacifism, but the kids call him a wuss. She later has Ted come to class after he has been punched by Doug to preach the consequences of fighting. The kids are still unmoved.

Marshall is shown with Lily at his mother's house 3–5 years later for Thanksgiving and he pulls out a lightsaber to carve the turkey.

== Critical response ==
Donna Bowman of The A.V. Club rated the episode B+. Michelle Zoromski of IGN rated the episode 8.2 out of 10. Television Without Pity gave the episode a rating A. Popular Movie and TV show rating site, IMDb rated the episode 8.2/10.
