= Livers Ain't Cheap =

- Directed by: James Merendino
- Written by: James Merendino
- Produced by: Kurt MacCarley
- Starring: James Russo; Jeremy Piven
- Cinematography: Greg Littlewood; Bernard Salzmann
- Music by: Peter Leinheiser
- Release date: 1996
- Running time: 89 minutes
- Country: United States
- Language: English

Livers Ain't Cheap (also known as The Real Thing) is a 1996 crime film written and directed by James Merendino and starring James Russo, Jeremy Piven, Emily Lloyd, Fabrizio Bentivoglio, Ashley Lawrence, Esai Morales, Gary Busey and Rod Steiger.

== Plot ==
Rupert Little is an ex-con, has decided to go straight. His little brother James wants to pursue a life of delinquency. After being released from jail, James tells Rupert that while he was in jail, he overheard Dexter, a criminal who was arrested for a purse snatching incident, tells his friend Collin that he plans to heist a nightclub on New Year's Eve. But when James is suddenly gunned down by Collin, who wanted him out of the way, he lies in a hospital bed. When Rupert arrives at the hospital, he learns that James needs a liver transplant. Determined to save him, Rupert decides to execute the heist himself to get the money he needs. After Rupert quits his job, he assembles a crew of ex-cons, including Dexter who had to break out of prison, his best friend John and his ex-girlfriend Lisa Turtle. On the night of the heist, Rupert and his gang enter the nightclub for a climax showdown that spins out of control.

== Cast ==
- James Russo as Rupert Little
- Jeremy Piven as John
- Fabrizio Bentivoglio as Alfredo Donati
- Robert LaSardo as Eric Fidel
- Ashley Laurence as Carla
- Emily Lloyd as Lisa Tuttle
- Dave Buzzotta as James Little
- Rod Steiger as Victor
- Pat Gallagher as Dexter
- Esai Morales as Collin
- Gary Busey as Foreman
- Max Perlich as Tom
- Barbara Nickell as Bartender
- James Wardlaw as Magnus

== Production ==
Principal photography began on July 1, 1995 and lasted for 30 days. Filming took place in and around Los Angeles, California. The prison breakout scene was filmed at the Old Montana Prison in Deer Lodge, Montana. Filming at the prison began on the evening of July 20. Part of the area was cordoned off for filming. The crew used a one camera movement for filming the character Dexter climbing from the prison wall, dressed as a guard, walking out from the gate, across the bridge and into a car. Filming at the prison was finished in the early morning hours on July 21. After that, the cast and crew went back to Los Angeles and filming wrapped in late July.

== Released ==
Livers Ain't Cheap was released at the Palm Springs Film Festival on January 12, 1996.

== Home Video ==
The film was released on VHS on January 13, 1998. Instead of using the original title, it was released under the new title The Real Thing.
