= They Go On =

They Go On is a 1997 soap opera web series developed by Levi Strauss & Co. and NBC and streamed at NBC.com. The show, funded entirely by Levi Strauss, was based on characters from their advertising campaign of the same name.

The show featured characters from the ads, such as D.J. Marcus and the Impala Man, with two lead characters introduced for the show, Chloe (played by Laura Prepon) and Zack. Chloe and Zack interacted with the viewers during the "broadcast" via an Internet forum that was part of the website.

Tarsem from @radical.media directed the original ads. NBC Digital Productions then created a new media drama which tied together the ads and added interactive features.

It was touted as a new example of the blurring of the lines between advertisements and entertainment, an alternative to product placement, infomercials, or various forms of undercover marketing.

== External links and references ==
- Levi Strauss decides its jeans could use a little soap, a September 1997 article from the San Francisco Business Times
- "NBC continues TV/Internet convergence with Snap! alliance". SHOOT. August 1998. Archived from the original on October 11, 2012 – via HighBeam Research.
- Elliott, Stuart (October 8, 1997). "Levi Strauss campaigns become pieces at an exhibition". The New York Times.
- Jean's List, from an October 1997 Entertainment Weekly article
- The Fall Girls, a September 1998 article from Maxim identifying Prepon as Chloe
