= Murtaugh (How I Met Your Mother) =

- How I Met Your Mother episode
- Episode no.: Season 4 Episode 19
- Directed by: Pamela Fryman
- Written by: Joe Kelly
- Original air date: March 30, 2009

Guest appearances
- Danny Glover as Roger Murtaugh (archive footage); Robert Wisdom as McCracken

Episode chronology
← Previous "Old King Clancy"	Next → "Mosbius Designs"
- How I Met Your Mother season 4

"Murtaugh" is the 19th episode in the fourth season of the television series How I Met Your Mother and 83rd overall. It originally aired on March 30, 2009. In this episode, Ted and Barney feud over what activities are appropriate for their age, while Marshall and Lily disagree on how to coach Lily's students.

== The Title ==
The episode's title, "Murtaugh," is a reference to the character Roger Murtaugh from the Lethal Weapon film series, played by Danny Glover. The character is known for frequently saying the line, "I'm too old for this," which parallels the theme of the episode where Ted creates a "Murtaugh List" of activities he believes he is too old to do.

== Plot ==
Barney is banned from laser tag for being too rough, so he plans to toilet paper the arena. Ted notes that Barney is too old for laser tag, and reveals his "Murtaugh List" of things he believes he is too old to do anymore, which includes pulling an all nighter, eating an entire pizza in one sitting, and hanging posters without frames. Barney "accepts" the "challenge" of completing the entire list within 24 hours and makes Ted a bet that if he succeeds, Ted must toilet paper the laser tag arena with him; if he fails, he must let Ted give him a three-hour lecture on architecture.

Barney endures various injuries and indignities as he works his way through the list including piercing his own ear (and putting off getting the infection looked at), having a sore back after sleeping on a futon, taking shots with strangers and recording a two-person answering machine message. When Ted admits he looks forward to being old, Barney and Robin create a list of things Ted is too young to do; Ted and Barney raise the stakes of their bet, and Ted attempts to complete the new list, including wearing reading glasses, yelling at neighbourhood kids, having dinner at 4PM, bed at 8PM, getting up at 4AM and taking forever to answer the phone, before Barney completes the Murtaugh List.

After being drugged at a rave and being too scared to drink a beer through a beer bong, Barney accepts that he is growing older and concedes to Ted. But Ted reveals he has rewatched the entire Lethal Weapon series, and realized that Murtaugh consistently did the things he claimed to be too old for. He destroys the Murtaugh List and joins Barney and Robin in TPing the arena, where they are caught by the owner, who calls the police.

Meanwhile, Marshall agrees to coach Lily's kindergarten's basketball team. Lily hopes this will serve as "dad training", but is horrified when Marshall is extremely aggressive towards the children, in imitation of his own father. Lily prefers a completely passive coaching style emphasizing the fun of playing, and notes that no score is kept and everyone receives participation trophies. Marshall is horrified by this fact, but is threatened by Lily to be nice and go easier on the children. The team fails to make even a single basket in the game, with Marshall's and Lily's competing efforts seemingly only worsening their performance. But Marshall cherishes the participation trophy he receives, ultimately accepting that Lily's philosophy has some merit.

== Production ==
Marshall and Lily have a telepathic or "psychic conversation" because they know each other so well they can communicate without speaking. The reason for this is that Alyson Hannigan had laryngitis and could not talk.

== Critical response ==
The A.V. Club rated the episode giving it a B grade.

Michelle Zoromski of IGN gave the episode 9 out of 10.

Cindy McLennan of Television Without Pity rated the episode with a grade A−.
