= Warlock III: The End of Innocence =

1999 film

- DVD cover
- Directed by: Eric Freiser
- Written by: Bruce David Eisen; Eric Freiser
- Produced by: Bruce David Eisen
- Starring: Bruce Payne; Ashley Laurence; Boti Bliss; Angel Boris; Paul Francis; Rick Hearst; Jan Schweiterman
- Cinematography: Andrew Turman
- Edited by: Greg Finton
- Music by: David Reynolds
- Distributed by: Trimark Pictures
- Release date: October 12, 1999
- Running time: 94 minutes
- Country: United States
- Language: English
- Budget: $2,000,000

Warlock III: The End of Innocence is a 1999 American direct-to-video fantasy horror film written by Bruce David Eisen and Eric Freiser and directed by the latter. It is the third and final film in a trilogy that started with the 1989 Warlock. The first two films starred Julian Sands as the Warlock, but Bruce Payne replaced him in this film.

The film was shot in Roger Corman's studio in Ireland.

== Plot ==
The story tells of a young girl called Kris who has no knowledge of her family, so when a historian tells her she has inherited a family house, she goes to see it. Her boyfriend Michael, their friends Scott, Lisa, and Jerry, and her best friend Robin, who is a witch, join her. Kris is haunted by visions and dreams of her past life and of a doll from her past life. A warlock, Phillip Covington, wanted her as a sacrifice until her mother used her own magic to trap him in the Catacombs of his home. Kris's night in the house is full of strange and supernatural events, including seeing an apparition of a young child. Jerry attempts to fix the pipes and accidentally breaks them, releasing Covington.

Kris goes to meet the historian the next day. Covington, who is posing as an architect, kills the historian, and destroys the letters from Kris's mother. Covington then toys with Kris and her friends, and convinces Jerry to steal Robin's talisman and a lock of her hair. Robin attempts to fight Covington with magic, but Covington is more experienced and wins, turning Robin into a glass statue and then shattering her. He then captures and tortures Kris's remaining friends to lure her to him.

Covington captures Kris and reveals that he plans to exchange her soul with a consort from hell to mother a race of evil. Kris escapes and fights back Covington, who begins to take a more demonic appearance. She takes the sacrificial blade and stabs him but Covington is unaffected. Kris then rips the doll from his hands and opens it, revealing a knife with which she stabs him in the heart, successfully killing him.

Kris leaves with a book of magic, reading the tarot card of strength and walking into a new life.

== Cast ==
- Bruce Payne as The Warlock / Phillip Covington
- Ashley Laurence as Kris Miller
- Boti Bliss as Robin
- Angel Boris as Lisa
- Paul Francis as Michael
- Rick Hearst as Scott
- Jan Schweiterman as Jerry
- Éamonn Draper as Mr Butterfield
- Catherine Siggins as Mrs Miller
- Fiona O'Shaughnessy as Kris' friend

== Reception ==
The film has received mixed reviews, although Bruce Payne's performance was praised. Richard Scheib, writing for The Science Fiction, Horror and Fantasy Film Review Database said that "as the Warlock, Bruce Payne, an actor who has magnificently theatrical charisma and presence is actually better in the part than the perpetually overwrought Julian Sands.". The film critic John Fallon stated that Payne gave "a charismatic, subdued scary performance" in the film and that he "couldn't take [his] eyes off him" as he was "all charm". Payne was described as a suave warlock by The Fresno Bee. The director of the film, Eric Freiser, stated that "in the first two movies, Julian was very smooth as the character, but Bruce makes for a scarier villain. You feel he is capable of more evil than Julian".

John Fallon at JoBlo.com gave the film a score of three and a half out of four. A reviewer for Beyond Hollywood stated that the film is "actually quite interesting, if a bit slow and plodding for the first hour". A reviewer for The A.V. Club stated that "it may be blandly competent, but everything about Warlock III seems painfully arbitrary". In contrast, Richard Scheib stated that "Warlock 3 is a halfway good film, certainly a lot better than the second one. It is rather flatly lit, but director Eric Freiser generates some often quite unusual atmosphere – like scenes where Ashley Laurence turns away from a mirror and unseen by her her reflection starts screaming; one victim being transformed into glass and then shattered; and a scene where Ashley Laurence thinks she has broken through a wall and runs away to freedom, only to become caught in a loop where she is not only running over and over but also watching herself run".
