= The Front Porch =

- How I Met Your Mother episode
- Episode no.: Season 4 Episode 17
- Directed by: Rob Greenberg
- Written by: Chris Harris
- Original air date: March 16, 2009

Guest appearance
- Laura Prepon as Karen

Episode chronology
← Previous "Sorry, Bro"	Next → "Old King Clancy"
- How I Met Your Mother season 4

"The Front Porch" is the 17th episode in the fourth season of the television series How I Met Your Mother and 81st overall. It originally aired on March 16, 2009. In the episode, Ted discovers that Lily has sabotaged his current, and previous relationships.

== Plot ==
After Robin gets upset about the gang not watching her show, they all agree to watch Robin's 4:00am talk show. Ted informs them that Karen broke up with him after finding Robin's earring in his bed. Ted discovers the matching earring on Marshall's dresser and mutes the television to confront Marshall, believing him to have sabotaged his relationship. Lily confesses that she was the saboteur, as she had been in some of Ted's prior relationships, including with Robin. She justifies her actions using the "Front Porch Test"—an indication of how they would all live together once they grow old. Scenes are shown of Marshall, Lily and Ted in the far future playing bridge, their interactions with Ted's potential partner driving Lily's present actions.

Robin returns home to learn that her friends missed her event-filled broadcast due to the argument, involving her giving a heartfelt tribute to her friends, dousing her co-anchor with a fire extinguisher after he catches fire, administering CPR to her co-anchor after he collapses, and helping a guest give birth live on-air. Lily insists she did not want to break them up, but merely to consider their future together, a suggestion that seeded the conversation that would lead to their breakup. Ted heads into the bar the next day to find Karen waiting, having had the situation explained to her by Lily. Karen hands Ted an apology letter from Lily, who has prepared a fine dinner in Ted's apartment for him and Karen. Ted breaks up with Karen after she says he cannot see someone as manipulative as Lily again and he does the "Front Porch Test" himself, imagining what the future would be like without her and Marshall. Returning to the apartment, Ted asks Robin to be his "plus one" and they enjoy the meal Lily prepared. They wonder whether or not they would still be together if not for Lily's intervention. Ted then makes a mock proposal to Robin, asking her to be his "backup wife". She accepts.

Marshall wears a nightshirt to the pajama party to watch Robin's show, while Barney wears a silk suit. Barney insists his clothing choice is superior, citing the possibility of attractive women coming to his home at night and seeing how good he looks, but then admits how unlikely that is and uncomfortable the "suitjamas" are. Marshall convinces Barney to try a nightshirt instead. Barney and Marshall delight in their nightshirts, having a dream about flying together in them. Barney starts wearing nightshirts to sleep. A week later, an attractive woman shows up at his apartment at night but, upon seeing his nightshirt, she decides to leave, much to Barney's chagrin.

== Critical response ==
The episode was positively reviewed with Donna Bowman of The A.V. Club rating the episode with a grade A, and Michelle Zoromski of IGN gave 8.9 out of 10, and praising the premise of the episode.

== Cultural references ==
Marshall imagines flying over New York in his night gown exactly the same way The Dude (Jeff Bridges) flies over Los Angeles in an unconscious fantasy in The Big Lebowski. It even features the same song, "The Man In Me" by Bob Dylan.

Lily's militaristic speech about secretly breaking Ted up with past girlfriends for his own good, while Ted demands to know if Lily was responsible for him and Robin breaking up, is reminiscent of Jack Nicholson and Tom Cruise's explosive exchange in the climax of A Few Good Men.
