= Mikey (film) =

1992 film by Dennis Dimster-Denk

- Theatrical release poster
- Directed by: Dennis Dimster-Denk
- Written by: Jonathan Glassner
- Produced by: Peter Abrams; Robert L. Levy; Natan Zahavi
- Starring: Josie Bissett; Lyman Ward; John Diehl; Ashley Laurence; Mimi Craven; Brian Bonsall
- Cinematography: Tom Jewett
- Edited by: Omer Tal; Natan Zahavi
- Music by: Tim Truman
- Production company: Tapestry Films
- Distributed by: Imperial Entertainment
- Release date: September 23, 1992
- Running time: 92 minutes
- Country: United States
- Language: English

Mikey is a 1992 American psychological slasher film directed by Dennis Dimster-Denk and written by Jonathan Glassner. It stars Brian Bonsall in his feature film debut as the title character, a young boy adopted by a family, who turns out to be a violent psychopath.

== Plot ==
A young boy is setting fire to newspapers in the basement. His name is Mikey and he has a younger sister, Beth, whom he blames for the fire when his foster mother admonishes Mikey.

When Mikey is disciplined by his foster mother for starting the fire, he responds by causing Beth to drown in the pool, electrocuting his foster mother while she is in the bath, and bludgeoning his foster father to death with a baseball bat. Mikey avoids suspicion because he is only nine and he tells the police that an intruder killed the family. Detective Reynolds is assigned to the case and he does not suspect Mikey.

A psychiatrist recommends that Mikey get fostered as soon as possible. His foster mother's sister is put forward as a prospective foster carer, but she does not want anything to do with Mikey. She states that he was adopted and that it was suspected that he was abused by members of his family.

He is then sent to a new family, Neil and Rachel Trenton, who do not know anything about Mikey's past. Presenting himself as an amiable and loving child, his behavior does not raise red flags. He also manifests behavior which is not out of the ordinary in his desire to succeed in a game at school.

Mikey then falls in love with his new best friend Ben's older sister, Jessie, who is 10 years older than Mikey. She is not interested in him and is dating a boy named David. In an attempt to make Jessie love him, Mikey kills Jessie's cat and places it under David's car to make it appear as though David was responsible. Tension arises in the relationship but Jessie forgives him. Mikey electrocutes David while he is in a Jacuzzi by kicking the radio in the water. After this fails and he is found out by his foster mother, he fatally stabs her with a glass shard. He kills his school's principal and teacher with a bow and arrow and slingshot when they arrive shortly afterward to investigate their suspicions, and unsuccessfully tries to shoot Jessie with a bow. To avoid being blamed, Mikey fakes his own death. He stages a skeleton of a boy the same age as him taken from his classroom at the dining table and then blows up the house with a gas leak and Molotov cocktail when his foster dad arrives home to find everyone dead around the table. Jessie is told by the authorities that Mikey is dead. Later, Mikey, going by the name "Josh," is adopted by another family.

== Cast ==
- Brian Bonsall as Michael "Mikey" Holt
- Josie Bissett as Jessie Owens
- Ashley Laurence as Shawn Gilder
- John Diehl as Neil Trenton
- Mimi Craven as Rachel Trenton
- Whitby Hertford as Ben Owens
- Lyman Ward as Mr. Jenkins
- David Rogge as David
- Mark Venturini as Detective Jack Reynolds
- Laura Robinson as Grace Calvin (last name revealed within a newspaper article in the film as "Kelvin")
- Steve Hart as Harold Calvin (last name revealed within a newspaper article in the film as "Kelvin")
- Keeley Marie Gallagher as Beth Calvin (last name revealed within a newspaper article in the film as "Kelvin")
- Lorenzo Obias as New Adoptive Father

== Controversy and banning in the United Kingdom ==
In the United Kingdom, the film was submitted to the BBFC for a video certificate shortly after the time of the murder of James Bulger in Liverpool in 1993. The BBFC, under strict head censor James Ferman, deliberated extensively over whether to pass the film, worrying that it would be targeted in the media furore over video violence, stemming from press reports that the two boys responsible for Bulger's murder had been inspired by a rented video of Child's Play 3.

The BBFC called in child psychologists and police to view the film. The child psychologists deemed it potentially harmful to impressionable young viewers such as the two children who had murdered Bulger. Cuts to reduce the impact of the strongest scenes were felt to make little impact on the film as a whole. By 1996, the distributor's rights to release the film were about to run out and, under pressure to make a decision, the BBFC rejected the film. The BBFC had previously awarded an 18 rating to a trailer released in November 1992, three months before the Bulger murder. On March 20, 2025, the film was officially unbanned and given a 15 rating for home entertainment.

== Reception and legacy ==
TV Guide panned the movie, which they felt was directed with "negligible flair" and had a "horrifying but implausible story". AllMovie also panned Mikey, rating it at one and a half stars out of five. In recent years, websites such as JoBlo.com have given it favorable reviews, citing it as something of a cult classic for its straight forward plot points and overall merit in the horror genre.

On June 24, 2022, the film was spoofed by RiffTrax.

== See also ==
- List of films featuring psychopaths and sociopaths
- Video nasty
