= Angel Boris =

American model and actress

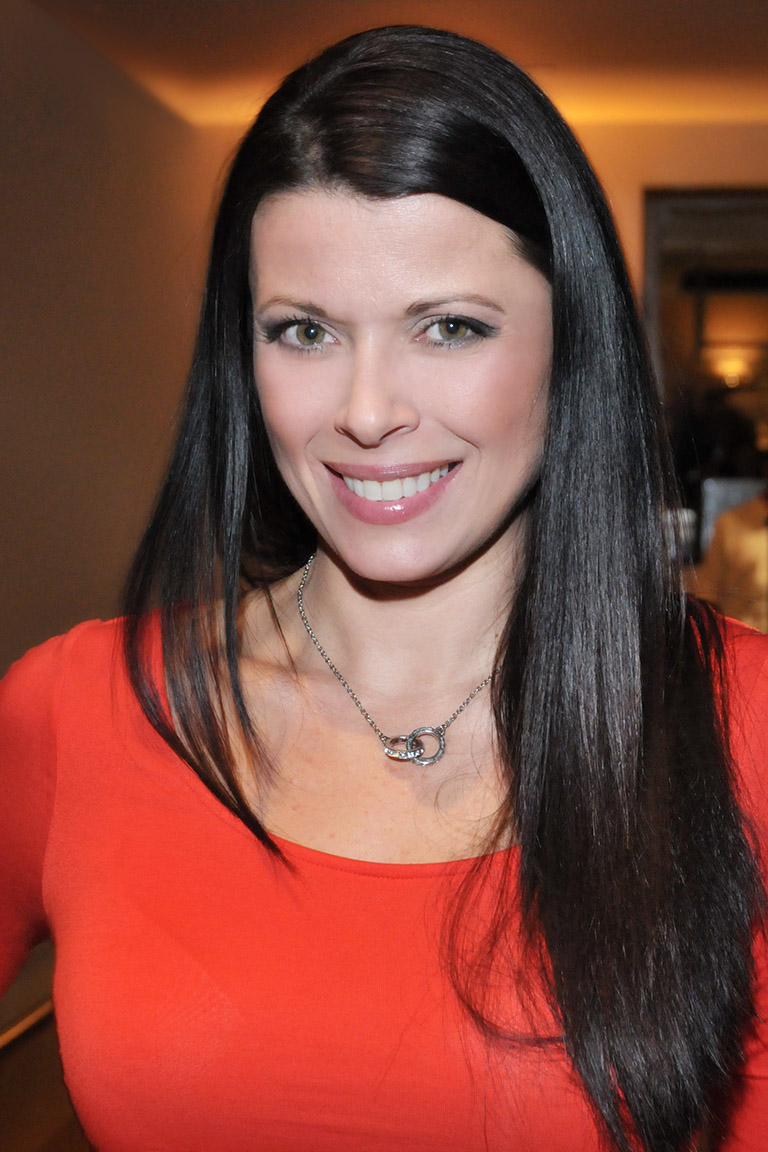
- Angel Boris, Beverly Hills, California, on November 12, 2014.

Playboy centerfold appearance
- July 1996
- Preceded by: Karin Taylor
- Succeeded by: Jessica Lee

Personal details
- Born: August 2, 1974 (age 52) Fort Lauderdale, Florida, USA
- Height: 5 ft 4 in (1.63 m)

Angel Lynn Boris (born August 2, 1974) is an American model and actress sometimes credited as Angel Boris Reed.

== Career ==
Boris was born in Fort Lauderdale, Florida, to a family of mixed Spanish, Irish, English, and Italian heritage. She had shown interest in performing since the age of five years old; she considered pursuing a career in modeling, singing, and/or acting. After entering the Venus Swimwear international model search in 1994, she was discovered by Playboy photographer David Chan. While working for Hawaiian Tropic, she appeared in a Playboy pictorial featuring the women of Hawaiian Tropic, and in July 1996, she became Playboy's Playmate of the Month. Her centerfold was photographed by Richard Fegley. She appeared in many special editions of the magazine.

She has also acted in several films (like Warlock III: The End of Innocence) and has appeared on numerous television shows and music videos (e.g., Monster Magnet - "Heads Explode"). Boris appeared in five episodes of the TV show Beverly Hills, 90210 during season eight, as Emma Bennett, a journalist who seduces Brandon Walsh. Boris also competed on the Playmate edition of the NBC show Fear Factor, coming in second to Lauren Michelle Hill.

In 2001, she appeared on the TV soap opera General Hospital for about six months, playing a character whose name was also Angel. In 2002, she made an appearance on The King of Queens.

In 2006, she played the role of Cindy in the feature film The Still Life.

Victoria Fuller	Kona Carmack	Priscilla Taylor	Gillian Bonner	Shauna Sand	Karin Taylor
Angel Boris	Jessica Lee	Jennifer Allan	Nadine Chanz	Ulrika Ericsson	Victoria Silvstedt
