= Lightning Bug (film) =

- Directed by: Robert Hall
- Written by: Robert Hall
- Produced by: Lisa Waugh
- Starring: Bret Harrison; Laura Prepon; Kevin Gage; Ashley Laurence; Lucas Till
- Cinematography: Brandon Trost
- Edited by: Joshua Charson
- Music by: Jason M. Hall
- Distributed by: Anchor Bay Entertainment
- Release date: April 9, 2004 (Philadelphia International Film Festival)
- Running time: 97 minutes
- Country: United States
- Language: English

Lightning Bug is a 2004 coming-of-age drama film. It is the debut film by writer/director and SFX makeup artist Robert Green Hall. The film is a fictionalized account of Hall's own childhood and entry into special effects makeup for film and television. It was filmed on location Fairview, Alabama. It was executive produced by Laura Prepon.

The film played at the Brooklyn Film Festival in 2004.

== Plot ==
Single mother Jenny Graves decides to restart her dead end life by moving out of Detroit and taking her two sons Green and Jay to small rural town in Alabama. Green is a fan of horror films, more specifically the makeup effects used to bring them to life. He meets a pair of affable locals, Tony Bennet and Billy Martin.

His mother's penchant for getting involved with the wrong type of men brings a very human monster into his life, Earl Knight.

Taking some horror films back to the video store, he meets Angevin Duvet who shares both his interest in the horror genre and fish-out-of-water status in the small town. Smart, funny and a sexy Goth girl he is instantly smitten. However, there are hints that there are some troubling aspects to her past.

Green approaches the local business man, Tightwiler, who runs a yearly haunted house and by startling him with one of his creations nabs the job of creating this year's haunted house. With his share of the ticket sales, he and Angevin can move to Hollywood to pursue their dreams. However, this puts him on a direct collision course with Angenvin's mother, a deeply religious woman involved with local Holy Calling of the Southern Saints church.

== Cast ==
- Ashley Laurence as Jenny Graves
- Bret Harrison as Green Graves
- Laura Prepon as Angevin Duvet
- Kevin Gage as Earl Knight
- Lucas Till as Jay Graves
- Hal Sparks as Deputy Dale
- Jonathan Spencer as Tony Bennet
- George Faughnan as Billy Martin
- Jamie Avera as Deputy Hollis
- Bob Penny as Tightwiler

== Reception ==
On the review aggregator website Rotten Tomatoes, 38% of 8 critics' reviews are positive.

On Bloody Disgusting, Mr. Disgusting rated it 10/10, writing at the conclusion of his review that it is "fun, fast-paced, energetic, thrilling, terrifying, comical and twisted." On Film Threat, Merle Bertrand commented that "there’s never much real suspense as to whether Green will be stuck chasing lightning bugs in Fairfield or bright lights in Los Angeles."

On Boston Herald, Lauren Beckham Falcone wrote that it "is a rare find because it's a surprisingly heartfelt (...) But not in the way you'd expect."
