= Mardi Gras: Spring Break =

2011 film by Phil Dornfield

- DVD cover
- Directed by: Phil Dornfield
- Written by: Josh Heald
- Produced by: Zanne Devine; Charle Lyons; Armyan Bernstein; Peter Jaysen; Greg Lessans
- Starring: Nicholas D'Agosto; Josh Gad; Bret Harrison; Arielle Kebbel; Danneel Harris; Carmen Electra; Regina Hall
- Cinematography: Thomas Ackerman
- Edited by: Mark Scheib
- Music by: Jared Faber; Marcus Miller
- Production companies: Beacon Pictures; Holding Pictures; Maxim Magazine; Screen Gems; Terra Firma Films
- Distributed by: Samuel Goldwyn Films
- Release date: September 23, 2011 (limited)
- Running time: 89 minutes
- Country: United States
- Language: English
- Budget: $5 million

Mardi Gras: Spring Break is a 2011 comedy/road trip film. It stars Nicholas D'Agosto, Josh Gad, Bret Harrison, Arielle Kebbel, Danneel Harris, Regina Hall, and Carmen Electra. It is directed by Phil Dornfield.

The film follows a trio of senior college students who visit New Orleans during the Mardi Gras season.

Originally shot in 2008 as Max's Mardi Gras, it was scheduled for release by Sony Pictures' Screen Gems division. It was shelved until September 2011, when Samuel Goldwyn Films released it in select cities.

== Plot ==
Mike's best friends and roommates at Penn State, Bump and Scottie, spread flyers to throw a rager before they graduate, advertising it by streaking through Mike's and his girlfriend Erica's lecture hall class. The party is an epic fail, then Erica comes by in tears, saying she must go home as her grandfather has died.

Bump insists they should have one more great time together and suggests they make their way to the annual Mardi Gras festival in New Orleans for "boobs, beads and brews." He wants Mike to be their wingman, as Scottie is still a virgin. He is hesitant, but agrees after they promise not to tell Erica.

The trio drive down to the city, not bothering to stop at their hotel first. They pick up colorful beaded necklaces on the way, as it is common practice to gift them on the parade route, on Bourbon Street. There, they see Carmen Electra, who Scottie instantly falls for, and a woman flashing her breasts, who Mike is shocked to see is Erica.

Bump and Scottie whisk Mike away before he can fully process what he saw. He calls Erica, but she does not answer. Mike is disappointed to find she lied about grieving over the death of her grandfather, only to go to Mardi Gras and flash her breasts to everyone.

Meanwhile, the trio discover first that Mike's car has been towed for being parked next to a fire hydrant. Then they learn that Scottie actually reserved a hotel restaurant table instead of a hotel room, forcing them all to sleep in an alley.

Waking early the next morning, Mike is ready to cut his losses and head back to Penn State. Bump shows up with Mike's recovered car keys and vows to get the group on a Bourbon Street balcony by midnight. He and Scottie get Mike back on board by showing him the video of Erica's flashing exploits.

Mike approaches a woman with the same color T-shirt as Erica at a bar, but her name is Lucy. Bump quickly fills her in on the fiasco of Mike's girlfriend, then disappears. Lucy reveals that her boyfriend cheated on her, then leaves with her group of friends.

Bump hits on a couple of young ladies, but soon another gentleman approaches them. Not realizing he is their father, he says he is trying to hit on them. The father, frustrated with the constant attention his teenage daughters are getting, threatens to take them home. Mike overhears their conversation, encouraging the man to leave New Orleans. As soon as he checks out, Mike and Bump get their room.

The trio find the bar that Lucy mentioned. There are three contests to get passes to a show later on with Carmen Electra. They have to compete with trios of women. The tasks consist of passing an orange neck to neck, then a cherry from mouth to mouth and finally a banana from lower body to lower body.

Although slightly humiliated by the experience, the three men do in fact get the tickets. Mike is motivated the whole time by seeing videos of his soon-to-be ex Erica participating in the same contest.

However, upon arriving at the venue, the trio are turned away for not wearing costumes or being accompanied by females. Mike contacts his attractive twin cousins who live locally. Upon returning to the venue, only Mike and Scottie can enter, as they are accompanied by only two women.

Bump does his best to find someone to go in with him, with no luck. Dejected, he returns to the cafe where he met Ann Marie, a local, slightly older woman. They become close enough friends for her to show him the real Mardi Gras.

They reconnect with his two friends and all end up partying on the balcony of a hotel where Ann Marie's dad is the manager. In the end, all the trio are happy. Mike finds Lucy, getting her to forgive him, Scottie loses his virginity to Carmen Electra and Bump ends up kissing the local woman.

== Cast ==
- Nicholas D'Agosto as Mike
- Josh Gad as Bump
- Bret Harrison as Scottie
- Arielle Kebbel as Lucy
- Danneel Harris as Erica
- Carmen Electra as herself
- Regina Hall as Ann Marie
- Becky O'Donohue as Cousin Janice
- Jessie O'Donohue as Cousin Janine
- Jessica Heap as Oyster Chick
- Julin Jean as Sarah
- Gary Grubbs as Mr. Duluth
- Denise Williamson as Samantha
- J. Patrick McNamara as Professor Fleischman
- Danni Lang as Maxim Model
- Stephanie Honore as Bourbon Street Girl
- Marcelle Baer as Oyster Girl #1
- Genevieve Michelle as Domonique

== Reception ==
On Shockya, Brent Simon rated it "D-" writing that "there is some piecemeal — though very minuscule, it must be stressed – charm to some of Gad's energetic rants (...) [but] Josh Heald's script is a recycled bunch of road trip cliches, and never very funny ones at that."
