= The Three Days Rule =

- How I Met Your Mother episode
- Episode no.: Season 4 Episode 21
- Directed by: Pamela Fryman
- Written by: Greg Malins
- Original air date: April 27, 2009

Guest appearances
- Kevin Michael Richardson as Stan; Rebecca Budig as Holli

Episode chronology
← Previous "Mosbius Designs"	Next → "Right Place, Right Time"
- How I Met Your Mother season 4

"The Three Days Rule" is the 21st episode of the fourth season of the television series How I Met Your Mother and 85th overall. It aired on April 27, 2009. The storyline features Ted's overeager communication with a woman he meets.

== Plot ==
At MacLaren's, Ted gets Holli's phone number and says that he will call her immediately, though Barney insists Ted should follow the "Three Days Rule" and wait that long. To circumvent the rule, Ted texts Holli instead. She texts him back quickly, and they continue an increasingly flirtatious conversation over the next two days, with Ted offering escalating levels of commitment to her. But after Ted receives a message apparently intended for someone else, mentioning takeout and sex, Robin spots Marshall with the takeout order and realizes that "Holli" has really been Marshall and Barney, having edited Holli's number in Ted's phone.

They explain that it has been a long time since Ted was very interested in a girl, and their goal is to lure Ted into saying "I love you" too soon, to release his stored-up "crazy" and give him a better chance with Holli after he really contacts her, noting that he had a look on his face, similar to the look he had on his date with Robin. They tell her that there are three signs that Ted displays before telling his date that he loves them: suggesting that they get married, planning a trip too soon, and getting too personal. Stan, a night security guard and MacLaren's regular, provides them with beautiful messages in an effort to obtain this result. These messages inadvertently cause them to fall in love with Stan as well.

Barney and Marshall then complain that Ted is not confessing as soon as they had expected, which Robin does not care about and demands them to stop. When Robin goes back to the apartment, she reveals the truth to Ted, so he "confesses" via text that he had a gay sex dream about his "best friend", leading Barney and Marshall to argue over which of them is more attractive to Ted and who is his best friend. Later at MacLaren's, Ted lures them into spending half an hour listening to him describe a dream about dining with famous architects, before he reveals he knows about their deception and has tracked Holli down. He explains that he wants to meet a woman who likes his enthusiasm; Holli arrives, saying she found Ted's immediacy romantic, but when they go out to dinner she turns out to be an off-puttingly more desperate romantic than he is, showing the signs that Barney and Marshall had mentioned earlier. Future Ted then reveals that when he got the Mother's number, he did not wait three days to call her; he called her right away.

To Barney and Marshall's dismay, Stan shows up at McLaren's to take Robin out on a date. After Stan says a heartfelt goodbye speech to the men, he leaves with Robin after claiming he does not remember their names.

== Critical response ==
Donna Bowman of the A.V. Club gave the episode a B− rating.
