= I Heart NJ =

- How I Met Your Mother episode
- Episode no.: Season 4 Episode 3
- Directed by: Pamela Fryman
- Written by: Greg Malins
- Production code: 4ALH04
- Original air date: October 6, 2008

Guest appearances
- Sarah Chalke as Stella; Darcy Rose Byrnes as Lucy

Episode chronology
← Previous "The Best Burger in New York"	Next → "Intervention"
- How I Met Your Mother season 4

"I Heart NJ" is the third episode in the fourth season of the television series How I Met Your Mother and 67th overall. It originally broadcast, in the US, on October 6, 2008. Ted and Stella argue over moving to New Jersey, while Robin quits her job as a news anchor to pursue a new opportunity. The episode received mixed reviews, with some disliking the anti-New Jersey plot.

== Plot ==
Ted complains about having to travel to New Jersey to see Stella at her home. She is often asleep by the time he gets there, and he is missing important moments with his friends. Stella suggests the group come to New Jersey for a night out, and Ted talks his friends into it despite their reservations. He looks forward to Stella moving in with him in Manhattan after they are married.

Robin is sick of her job, which consists of reporting pointless stories and making bad puns about them. After being offered a major anchor job, she immediately accepts and makes her farewell broadcast, reciting a terrible speech written by Ted.

On Saturday, Ted, Marshall, Lily and Barney head to New Jersey. Stella's babysitter cancels at the last minute, so to their dismay they have to stay in Stella's basement. Barney makes a bad joke and solicits a fist bump, but everyone refuses. He stubbornly declares that he will not lower his arm until someone fist bumps him, even despite a growing cramp later on.

Robin arrives and explains that she only got an audition, not the actual anchor job. After being intimidated by the more experienced candidates at the audition, she says she has to go back to her old job. Lily and Barney try to dissuade her by reminding her how humiliating it was there, and Robin relents. Ted is shocked to find Stella expects him to move to New Jersey rather than moving to Manhattan with him, as she feels the city is not a safe place to raise her daughter Lucy. She asks Ted to go get some beer at the local store, where he and Marshall debate the merits of living in New Jersey. Marshall seems open to it, but Ted dislikes the idea.

When Ted and Marshall return, Ted confronts Stella about moving to New Jersey. They get into an argument comparing New York to New Jersey. Lily suggests that Stella will grow to love New York just like Marshall did. Marshall reveals that he actually hates New York, which feels cramped for someone of his large stature, much to Lily's shock. Ted refuses to relent, and Stella storms out. Ted goes to find her and finds Lucy, who was woken up by the argument. Ted reads Lucy a bedtime story and, realizing that Stella has to put her first, agrees to move to New Jersey.

Robin calls her old studio and asks for her job back. Her producer agrees, but only if she can make it to the studio in time for the broadcast in half an hour. She steals Lucy's bicycle and sets off, performing a number of increasingly improbable stunts in order to make it to the studio in time. After her first story contains a terrible pun, she decides she was right to quit and leaves. Barney and Lily watch the broadcast happily and Lily fist bumps Barney for helping her help Robin. Barney quickly makes another bad joke and asks for a high five, which he does not receive, keeping his hand raised until he receives one, and continues to ask when the group gets to the bar. Robin reveals she did not get the job she auditioned for but was offered another, and is going to move to Japan. Barney, shocked, lowers his hand.

== Critical response ==
Donna Bowman of The A.V. Club rated the episode B+. IGN gave the episode 7.8 out of 10. Cindy McLennan of Television Without Pity rated the episode with a grade C+. Alan Sepinwall of The Star-Ledger was rather critical of the episode stating: "What bothered me about "I Heart NJ" was that it took Ted's simplistic view of Jersey and seemed to apply such broad, black and white thinking to everything." Joel Keller, who hails from New Jersey, also expressed disgust at the episode.
