= Cheerleader effect =

Psychological effect on perceptions of attractiveness

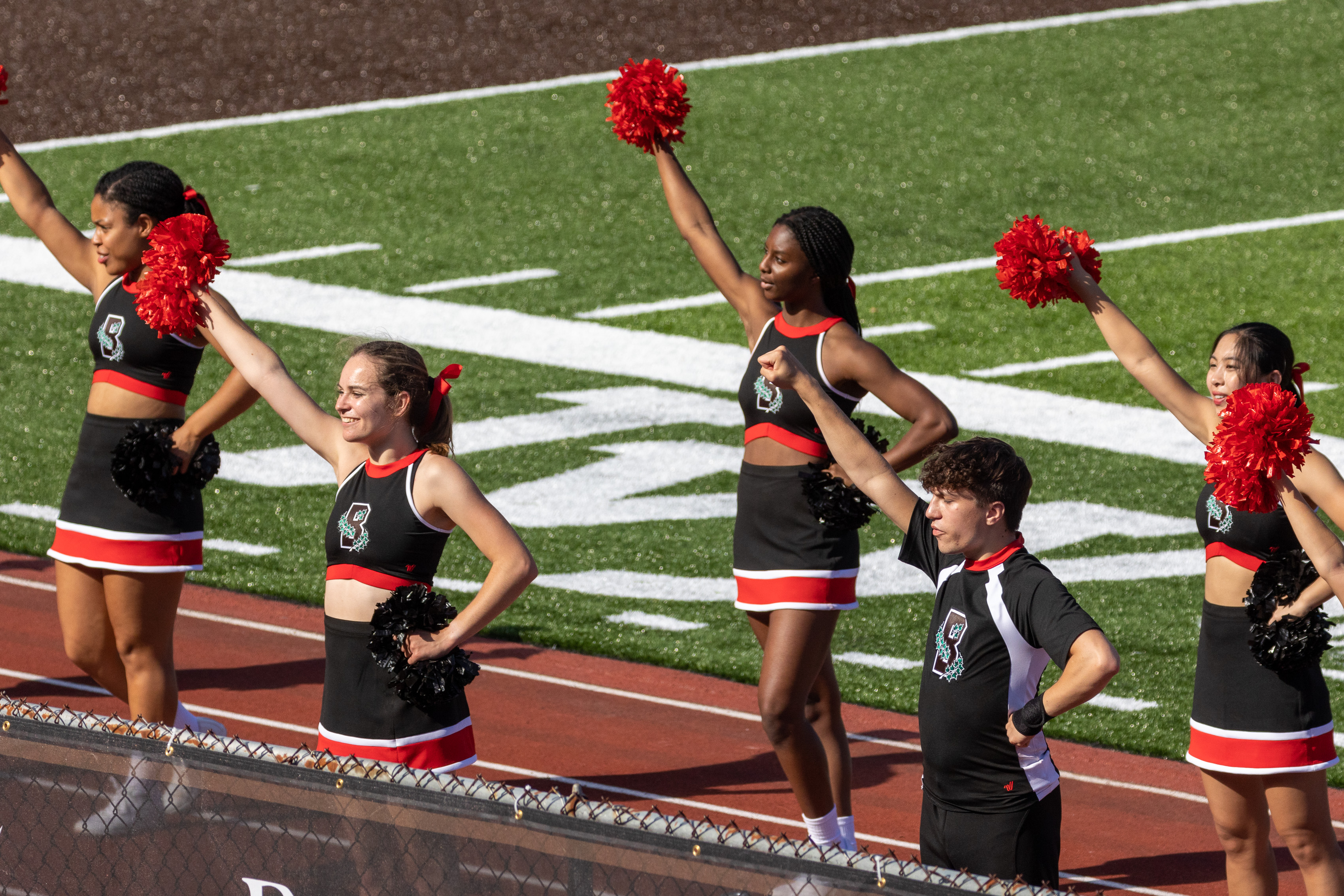
Brown University cheerleaders

The cheerleader effect, also known as the group attractiveness effect or the friend effect, is a proposed cognitive bias which causes people to perceive individuals as 1.5–2.0% more attractive in a group than when seen alone. The first paper to report this effect was written by Drew Walker and Edward Vul, in 2013.

Physical attractiveness implies individuals' preferences in a sexual selection based on the evolutionary psychology. In 1979, Donald Symons first proposed this evolutionary explanation, suggesting that the evolving physical attractiveness results from mate assessment favoring partners who exhibited signs of good health and fertility, including face averageness. This preference was proved to be shared across cultures. Two parts constitute physical attractiveness, and most former studies investigated underlying mechanisms leading to cheerleader effect specifically in its subset, facial attractiveness. Nevertheless, a study has recognized this effect in another physical appearance indicator, human body perceptions.

The effect size of the cheerleader effect is not modulated by the presentation time, the number of individuals surrounding the target, spatial arrangement of the faces in the group. However, another study argued that the arrangement of faces in the group might influence this effect since people's central viewing tendency might affect observers to focus more on the perceived attractiveness of the middle face in the group.

Findings of this effect are interdisciplinary in applications. Based on them, mate choice, marketing, and social media tactics are designed to increase the attractiveness of a target individual or item via the help of the group.

== Origin ==
The phrase was coined by the fictional character Barney Stinson (Neil Patrick Harris) in "Not a Father's Day", an episode of the television series How I Met Your Mother, first aired on November 10, 2008. Barney points out to his friends a group of women that initially seem attractive, but who are all unattractive when examined individually. This point is made again by two other characters, Ted Mosby (Josh Radnor) and Robin Scherbatsky (Cobie Smulders), later in the episode, who note that some of Barney's friends also only seem attractive in a group. This occurrence may be explained by the processing of Barney's visual system, in which his brain automatically calculated a combined beauty level of that group of ladies. This overall impression then impacts his assessment of the specific female within that group, leading him to believe she is similar to the previously established better average attractiveness.

== Conditions for the effect to occur ==
- Bias in recalling. The cheerleader effect occurred only when participants were asked to rate the attractiveness after images were removed from their vision, suggesting that an initial perceptual encoding with the existence of photos while rated could not lead to the effect.
- Contrast effect. It was found that the cheerleader effect occurred when the target face was the most attractive face compared to other members in the group but not when it was the least attractive so that the comparison among faces is required.

== Studies and proposed explanations ==
=== First study ===
In 2013, the first research was reported by Drew Walker and Edward Vul. Across five studies, participants rated the attractiveness of male and female faces when shown in a group photo, and an individual photo, with the order of the photographs randomised. The cheerleader effect was quantified as the difference between the attractiveness ratings assigned in the experimental condition (in a group photo) and the control (in an isolated image) condition. It was found that participants consistently rated the person as more appealing in the group photograph compared to the individual picture.

This effect occurs with male-only, female-only and mixed gender groups, and both small and large groups. In addition, the effect occurs to the same extent with various group sizes of four and 16 people. Participants in studies looked more at the attractive people than the unattractive people in the group.

Drew Walker and Edward Vul proposed that this effect arises due to the interplay of three cognitive phenomena:

1. The human visual system takes "ensemble representations" of faces in a group. This explanation was backed up by Timothy F. Brady and George A. Alvarez's findings in 2011. In the study, participants were displayed with 30 sets of circles, and circles of various sizes surrounded a tested circle. When asked to determine the tested circle's size, observers' memory of its size is biased by the mean size of all circles shown to them to estimate, showing that people do not encode visual images in memory independently.
2. Perception of individuals is biased towards this average. People's visual systems subconsciously and automatically calculate the average facial impression so that any extreme is ruled out.
3. "Attractive faces are only average." Results showed that composited faces were rated as more attractive and typical without extreme features. Humans develop this preference for "prototype" face from early life since they are easily identified, and individuals could extract social information from these most facelike stimuli to aid social interaction.

When all three of these phenomena are taken together, researchers proposed that the cheerleader effect results from a "hierarchical encoding" and that the hierarchical structure of visual working memory makes observers summarize the group into an ensemble average. Specifically, the individual faces will seem more attractive in a group, as they appear more similar to the average group face, which is more attractive than members' faces.

=== Follow-up studies ===
However, this causation proposal of "hierarchical encoding" was doubted by Carragher et al. in 2019, who found that this effect also occurred in contexts that "were incompatible with hierarchical encoding." They then proposed another explanation: "Social inference mechanism." It implies that the social context of being surrounded by friends may elicit observers' positive inferences on the target's trait, like "friendly or likable, which causes an increase to their perceived attractiveness. However, a recent study in 2021 tested this hypothesis in trustworthiness judgments. It is found that the trait inferences on one's facial trustworthiness did not experience the cheerleader effect.

A 2015 study conducted by van Osch et al. confirmed the existence of the cheerleader effect obtained by Walker and Vul. Based on the effect, the research team offered two other potential explanations for it:

- Selective attention to attractive group members. "People selectively attending to" and have longer fixation time on the most appealing members within a group so that they tend to make group rating based on "an average of the ratings of the most attractive group members"instead of taking every member's attractiveness within the group into account.
- The Gestalt principle of similarity. It suggests that an initial perception of people's attractiveness is towards a group with a similar attractiveness degree as a whole, followed by the perception of its individual member's.

They claim that selective attention fits with the gathered data better. The explanation based on the Gestalt psychology was objected to in this study since researchers found that the effect only occur in the group with large variation in attractiveness. This finding thus was inconsistent with this principle of perceiving similar attractive people as a group to evaluate.

=== Replication failure ===
A 2015 replication of Walker and Vul's study failed to show any significant results for the group attractiveness effect. The research team hypothesized potential reasons for this. Firstly, this may be due to cultural differences, since the replication study was performed in Japan. Secondly, the effect size was affected by the variation in the composition of members in a group. Researchers suggested that the cheerleader effect was less likely to occur for people with the similar attractiveness level in a group since the selection attention would not happen to bias participants' memory towards a higher attractiveness average.

== Applications ==
- Marketing strategy. This effect was also found in non-human group images so its application in consumer behaviors was investigated. For example, many firms employ product bundling by utilizing customers' psychology of integrating assessments of individual products within a package to create an overall evaluation of the entire package to strengthen the competitiveness of their target products in the market.
- Dating strategy. Having friends to accompany with or displaying profile photos in a crowd, particularly "being surrounded by unattractive friends may help" to improve perceived attractiveness due to this effect.

== Criticisms and prospects ==
It is argued that the perception of facial attractiveness may be influenced by the race information in the stimulus face. The future study could display participants with diverse races of faces like mixed-raced composites to test this race effect.

In addition, repeated exposure to moderately attractive faces is found to reward the emotional system, and it is positively correlated to the perceived attractiveness. Therefore, watching the target faces twice in a repeated measures design may contribute to observers' ratings of better attractiveness, regardless of the contribution of the cheerleader effect.
