= Karin Taylor =

Jamaican model (born 1971)

Karin Katherine Taylor
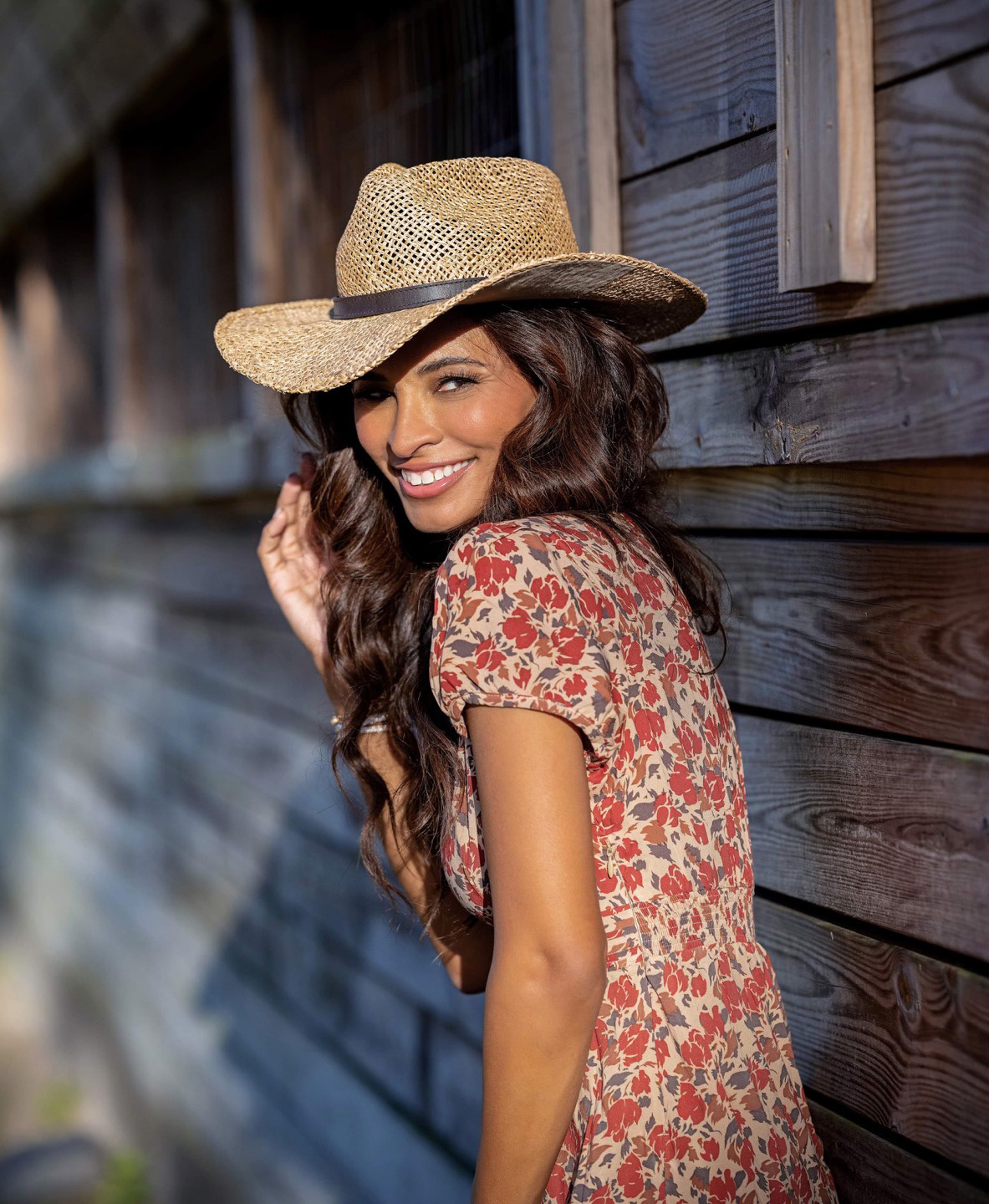

Playboy centerfold appearance
- June 1996
- Preceded by: Shauna Sand
- Succeeded by: Angel Boris

Personal details
- Born: Karin Katherine Taylor; November 28, 1971 (age 54) Kingston, Jamaica
- Height: 5 ft 9 in (1.75 m)
- Official website

Karin Katherine Taylor (born November 28, 1971) is a former international fashion model, known as Playboy magazine's June 1996 Playmate of the Month.

== Career ==
Taylor was born in Kingston, Jamaica and began her modeling career at age 17, when she was discovered by the Ford Modeling agency in Miami. During her ten-year modeling career, she was represented around the world by such agencies as Wilhelmina Models NYC, Agence Unique (Greece), ICE Model Management (South Africa) and David and Lee Models Chicago. She first appeared on television in 1992 as a Spokesmodel Contestant on Ed McMahon's Star Search, which began filming in Orlando that year.

In 1996, Taylor was selected as the Miss June Playmate of the Month in Playboy magazine. After her appearance in Playboy, Taylor moved to Los Angeles and began an acting career that included a guest-starring appearance on Baywatch as Taylor Johnson, as well as roles and appearances on: Malcolm and Eddie, Weird Al Show, Keenen Ivory Wayans Show, Horace Brown's music video, "Things We Do for Love" (Brett Ratner, director) and guest hosting on E!

In 1994, Snap-on tools discontinued their popular calendar, making Taylor the last official Snap-on calendar girl (November/December 1994) as reported by the Wall Street Journal.

Taylor briefly returned to her modeling roots and walked the runway one last time, for New York fashion designer Betsey Johnson, in her Spring 2001 collection, which was later made into a documentary.

Taylor is one of Florida's top philanthropists making a difference in the lives of at risk youth, foster children and veterans. Known for her three passions in life: children, animals and philanthropy. Taylor created Mandalay Farms, a 20-acre equestrian farm and exotic animal facility specializing in educational programs and animal assisted interventions, that benefit at-risk youth and children with developmental differences. Due to the world-wide popularity of Mandalay Farms' prehensile-tailed porcupine, Quinn, Karin went on to author the children's book picturebook Quinn: the porcupine with a soft velvet marshmallow nose.

Karin also is the host of the You Should Know podcast that explores a variety of topics aimed at informing and engaging listeners on various topics.

== Personal life ==
She worked as a lifeguard at the Wet 'n Wild Water park in Orlando, Florida before entering the entertainment industry as a dancer for Walt Disney World in the Main Street Electrical Parade (1989–1990). Taylor lives in Florida and is the mother of 5 children whom she chose to homeschool.

== See also ==
- List of people in Playboy 1990–1999

Victoria Fuller	Kona Carmack	Priscilla Taylor	Gillian Bonner	Shauna Sand	Karin Taylor
Angel Boris	Jessica Lee	Jennifer Allan	Nadine Chanz	Ulrika Ericsson	Victoria Silvstedt
