= Little Minnesota =

- How I Met Your Mother episode
- Episode no.: Season 4 Episode 11
- Directed by: Pamela Fryman
- Written by: Chuck Tatham
- Production code: 4ALH12
- Original air date: December 15, 2008

Guest appearance
- Erin Cahill as Heather Mosby

Episode chronology
← Previous "The Fight"	Next → "Benefits"
- How I Met Your Mother season 4

"Little Minnesota" is the 11th episode in the fourth season of the television series How I Met Your Mother and 75th overall. It originally aired on December 15, 2008, on CBS.

== Plot ==
Robin enters MacLaren's wearing an unseasonal T-shirt and explains to Ted that the cold weather does not affect her because she is from Canada. Marshall agrees and compares New York City in winter to a spring day in Minnesota, except for all the taxis, skyscrapers and non-white people. When Robin expresses homesickness, Marshall takes her to the Walleye Saloon, a Minnesota-themed bar that he goes to when he misses his family. Unfortunately, she likes it so much that she ends up pretending to be from Bemidji, Minnesota to befriend the bar patrons, much to Marshall's frustration. His frustration grows when she claims his story about the 1999 NFC Championship Game as her own and boils over after she beats his high score on the Fisherman's Quest video game, at which point he unmasks Robin as a Canadian. Before storming out, Robin goes on a tirade on how great Canada is on a personal level, bringing up the great things Canada introduced that Americans take for granted, and admits she wishes she was there right now. Marshall apologizes to Robin and reassures her that despite her lack of job or boyfriend, she still belongs in New York with her friends. To help ease her Christmas homesickness he takes her to a Canadian-themed bar, the Hoser Hut, capped off with a crowd-pleasing karaoke rendition of Robin's teenage hit "Let's Go to the Mall", much to her embarrassment.

Meanwhile, Ted reveals that his sister Heather (Erin Cahill) has arrived in New York and is planning to move there. According to Ted, Heather is irresponsible, citing examples such as the time she sold his possessions to buy tickets and travel to a Nine Inch Nails concert in Spain, and he doubts that she will ever actually move there. Additionally, Ted has prevented Barney from meeting Heather each time she has visited, fearing that Barney would try to hook up with her. However, his attempt to prevent their meeting again is immediately foiled when Barney is found waiting for the group at the apartment after Lily, being unable to keep secrets, accidentally tipped him off that Ted was planning to bring Heather there. Barney is hurt that Ted tried to keep him away from Heather and explains that he never intended to act on all the inappropriate jokes he made. Ted explains that he does not trust Heather or Barney, though he eventually relents and invites Barney to dinner with them on Sunday.

Over dinner, Heather and Ted discuss her decision to move to New York to work in finance and she asks him to co-sign the lease of an apartment she found. However, his lack of faith in her proves an obstacle. Frustrated with Ted's insensitivity, Heather and Barney stage a fake sexual encounter after their interview at Goliath National Bank and ensure that Lily walks in on them, knowing that she will not be able to keep it a secret from Ted. Heather and Barney persist in taunting Ted until he confronts them at MacLaren's, claiming that Heather has never taken responsibility for herself. Barney explains the plan to the surprised Ted and Lily, at the same time revealing that he kissed Ted's mother. Heather storms out to find a hotel, denouncing Ted for refusing to accept that she has grown up. Eventually Ted makes up with Heather and co-signs her lease, telling her he wants to get to know the new her.

== Critical response ==
Donna Bowman of The A.V. Club rated the episode with a grade B−.

Michelle Zoromski of IGN gave the episode 9.8 out of 10, saying Barney steals the show once again.
