= Romancing the Bride =

- Written by: Kris Isacsson
- Directed by: Kris Isacsson
- Starring: Laura Prepon; Matt Cedeño
- Theme music composer: David Derby; Michael Kotch
- Country of origin: United States
- Original language: English

Production
- Producer: Tim Perell
- Cinematography: Luis David Sansans
- Editor: Keith Reamer

Original release
- Release: December 3, 2005

Romancing the Bride is a 2005 romantic comedy film directed by Kris Isacsson and starring Laura Prepon and Matt Cedeño.

== Plot ==
The plot surrounds a confused bride Melissa (Prepon) who wakes up hand-cuffed to a Mexican stranger who claims to be her husband; she has no recollection of the marriage after having consumed a Mexican "moonshine" drink and having forgotten the events that occurred the previous night.

== Trivia ==
Filmed in San Marcos, Guerrero, Mexico.

== Cast ==
- Laura Prepon....Melissa
- Matt Cedeño.....Carlos
- Carrie Fisher.....Edwina
- Maria Thayer.....Kimmy
- Josh Randall.....Brian
- Jen Drohan.....Claire
- Manuel Sevilla.....Esteban
