= Genevieve Michelle =

American model and actress

Genevieve Michelle, born Genevieve Guzchack, is an American model and actress.

Michelle was featured in Playboy magazine in the late 1990s and the 2000s.

As an actress, under the name Genevieve Guzchack, she has appeared in the films: Golf Balls! (1999) as "Kristy - Pennytree Girl #3", The Last Tomorrow (2007) as "Sarah Zimmer", Suitable for Murder (2008) as "Stiletto", Disaster Movie (2008) as "Bikini Girl #1", Moonlighters (2010) as "The Wife", Dallywood (TV 2011) as "Stacey", and Mardi Gras (2010/2011-post production) as "Domonique".
