= The Loop (American TV series) =

American television sitcom (2006–2007)

- Genre: Sitcom
- Created by: Pam Brady; Will Gluck
- Starring: Bret Harrison; Eric Christian Olsen; Philip Baker Hall; Mimi Rogers; Joy Osmanski; Amanda Loncar; Sarah Mason
- Opening theme: "Hockey Monkey" by James Kochalka Superstar and the Zambonis
- Composer: Brad Segal
- Country of origin: United States
- Original language: English
- No. of seasons: 2
- No. of episodes: 17

Production
- Executive producers: Pam Brady; Will Gluck
- Producers: Kim Sherwood; Randy Cordray; Karen Kirchner; Victor Hsu; Bret Harrison
- Production locations: Chicago, Illinois
- Cinematography: Jonathan West; Michael A. Price
- Camera setup: Single-camera
- Running time: 30 minutes
- Production companies: Olive Bridge Entertainment; Wounded Poodle Productions; 20th Century Fox Television

Original release
- Network: Fox
- Release: March 15, 2006 – July 1, 2007

The Loop is an American television sitcom that aired on Fox from March 15, 2006, to July 1, 2007. The series stars Bret Harrison as Sam Sullivan, a young professional trying to balance the needs of his social life with the pressures of working at the corporate headquarters of TransAlliance Airways, a major U.S. airline. Chicago's downtown loop area was the setting for most of the show.

== Premise ==
The Loop focuses on the life of its main character, Sam Sullivan (Bret Harrison). The show is shot with a single-camera setup instead of a multiple-camera setup more typical for situation comedies. The series follows Sam, his friends, and his co-workers as they try to survive both their personal and professional lives. A complete script is written for each episode but actors are also given opportunities to improvise their lines during the shooting process.

== Cast ==
=== Main ===
- Bret Harrison as Sam "Thesis" Sullivan: A young professional trying to balance the needs of his social life with the pressures of working at the corporate headquarters of TransAlliance Airways.
- Philip Baker Hall as Russ McDonald: Head executive of TransAlliance Airways and one of Sam's bosses. He's lived a wild life in aviation, from Air Force pilot to head of the company, which occasionally comes back to haunt him.
- Eric Christian Olsen as Sully Sullivan: Sam's goofy, carefree and jobless older brother and roommate.
- Amanda Loncar as Piper (season 1): One of Sam's friends, whom he has had a crush on since they met freshman year of college. She is also his roommate. In the first season. she was studying to become a doctor.
- Sarah Mason as Lizzy (season 1): One of Sam's friends and roommate. Her job in the first season was a bartender.
- Mimi Rogers as Meryl: Sexually adventurous, she is an executive at TransAlliance Airways, and one of Sam's bosses.
- Joy Osmanski as Darcy: Sam's personal assistant and former student at MIT. She frequently laments that most of her classmates are in space, suggesting she couldn't get security clearance, because a colorful past, which she's hiding from.

=== Recurring ===
- Ian Reed Kesler as Derek Rene Tricolli: An obnoxious businessman for Goldman Sachs, who works in the same building and constantly gets under Sam's skin. In the second season, it's suggested that he's omnisexual. In an episode of the second season, he makes a deal to trade business contacts with Sam, for a night of passion with Darcy; and she readily agrees to him pimping her out.
- Howard Miller as DeKeyser: Executive of TransAlliance Airways
- Michael D. Roberts as Hibbert: Executive of TransAlliance Airways

== Development and production ==
The Loop lasted only two seasons. Season 1 was 7 episodes. The show was renewed for a second season consisting of 13 episodes on May 12 by Fox. It was one of only two live-action sitcoms renewed for the 2006–2007 season on Fox, along with The War at Home. The Loop's second season took place mainly in the workplace, and less of it with Sam's friends. The producers stated they "found most of the comedy to be with Sam and his co-workers and they wanted to expand on that." On November 28, 2006, it was announced that the show's second-season episode order had been reduced from thirteen to ten, with Fox's crowded spring schedule believed to be the main reason for the reduction. The show was cancelled on May 17, 2007, before the second season was even broadcast. Fox eventually burned off the remaining episodes on Sundays beginning June 10, 2007.

== Episodes ==
=== Series overview ===
Season	Episodes	Originally released	
Season	Episodes	First released	Last released
1	7	March 15, 2006	April 13, 2006
2	10	June 10, 2007	July 1, 2007

=== Season 1 (2006) ===
No. overall	No. in season	Title	Directed by	Written by	Original release date	Prod. code	U.S. viewers (millions)
1	1	"Pilot"	Betty Thomas	Pam Brady & Will Gluck	March 15, 2006	1AKK79	13.70
Sam thinks he just might have a chance with longtime crush Piper when she and her boyfriend Marco break up days before her birthday. Sam, Sully and Lizzy go all out on plans to make her birthday special, with Sam hoping Marco's absence will finally give him the chance to express to Piper how he feels about her. But Sam's feelings for Piper get in the way when he generously makes her an offer he soon regrets.
2	2	"Jack Air"	Daisy von Scherler Mayer	Theresa Mulligan	March 16, 2006	1AKK04	4.75
When Sam's boss Russ gives Sam the assignment of creating a low-cost airline carrier for their company, Sam relishes the challenge. Meanwhile Lizzy's friend Jenna, a VP ("veteran partier") for a tequila company, tries to convince Sam to compete against her in a tequila challenge. Sam is determined to excel at both, but Jenna's persuasiveness lands him on the beach in Cabo San Lucas the morning his presentation is due, forcing him to think on his feet and come up with the big idea that will prove to Russ he is up to the challenge.
3	3	"Tiger Express"	Jay Chandrasekhar	Ira Ungerleider	March 23, 2006	1AKK03	4.45
Sam reconnects at the bar with Jolie, a girl he ditched on their third date. Meanwhile, Sam's boss Russ claims they're being beaten in the airline business by Virgin Airlines and Sir Richard Branson. Russ has assigned Sam to take the Virgin flight to Hong Kong and investigate all the first class amenities Virgin offers in order to beef up their own TransAlliance airline.
4	4	"Trouble In The Saddle"	Rawson Thurber	Pam Brady & Will Gluck	March 30, 2006	1AKK02	4.03
On his way to an important business meeting at Russ's ranch, Sam stops off at home to put on some ranch attire. Sully has connected a zipline to the falafel cart across the street from their second-floor apartment and Sam gets pushed down it without the handle, smashing into the falafel cart below. He's rushed to the hospital with massive burns on his hands and a groin injury, but insists on leaving so he can get to his meeting on time. The doctor agrees to release him, but not until he can prove his groin area is in proper working condition.
5	5	"Year Of The Dog"	Dennie Gordon	Ira Ungerleider & Theresa Mulligan	April 6, 2006	1AKK05	3.61
Sam's college experience in Beijing, China, pays off when Meryl seeks his expertise to assist with a vital presentation she's giving to the Chinese Department of Transportation in order to save Trans Alliance Air from potential downfall. Meanwhile, things at home get out of line when Sully starts a dog-sitting business. Sully mistakes Sam's flash drive, containing his presentation information, for a dog biscuit. As the presentation meeting approaches, Sam and his roommates scramble to come up with a quick-fix idea to retrieve the flash drive.
6	6	"Bear Drop Soup"	Daisy von Scherler Mayer	Robin Shorr	April 12, 2006	1AKK01	5.20
When Sam’s boss Russ gives him a raise and an assignment to do a profit analysis of all the divisions, Sam comes up with a quick solution to the budget problem: cutting back the frequent flyer program. Not realizing this idea would translate to Russ’s eliminating the program completely, Sam finds himself in a bit of a predicament when his carpool buddy, who heads up the frequent flyer program, is fired – and all his coworkers turn against him. At home, Sully convinces Sam to buy a hot tub to celebrate his raise.
7	7	"Rusty Trombone"	Jay Chandrasekhar	Will Gluck & Pam Brady	April 13, 2006	1AKK06	3.22
Piper's favorite band, The Dandy Warhols, are in town and Sam sees this as the perfect opportunity for him to take Piper out on a date. After hitting Meryl up for Trans Alliance company tickets to the concert, and promising Piper tickets to the show, Sam gets stuck at a brainstorming session at work, leaving Piper, desperate to go to the show, forced to take Derek up on his offer to go with him. Knowing Sam has to work, Russ gives the company tickets to his son Keith.

=== Season 2 (2007) ===
No. overall	No. in season	Title	Directed by	Written by	Original release date	Prod. code	U.S. viewers (millions)
8	1	"Windows"	Andrew Fleming	Sam Laybourne	June 10, 2007	2AKK09	3.43
To increase profits at the company, Nordic clients are brought in for a new airport. After a gift for the clients turns out to be a terrible idea, the plan seems shot. That is until one of the clients offers to go clubbing with Sam, ruining his chances with the hot new secretary.
9	2	"The Phantom"	Dennie Gordon	Robia Rashid	June 10, 2007	2AKK10	3.60
When Russ destroys Sam's car, he starts treating him nicely by sending him to Hawaii and lending him his motorcycle. When Sully accidentally wrecks the motorcycle, Sam is forced to take a medical trial to make money. However the side effects ruin his date with the secretary, and when Sam realizes Russ was the one that wrecked his car, the surprise he had in store is ruined.
10	3	"Yeah, Presents"	Dennie Gordon	Pam Brady & Will Gluck	June 17, 2007	2AKK08	2.65
A scramble to find the perfect gift ensues as Russ' birthday approaches. Sam discovers Russ once owned an exotic bird, so he sets out to track one down.
11	4	"CSI: Donut Idol Bowl"	Jay Chandrasekhar	Ira Ungerleider	June 17, 2007	2AKK05	2.51
Russ wants the airline to have a family-friendly icon, and Sam submits an idea from Darcy. Though Russ likes the icon, he opts for a doodle drawn by Sully that inevitably causes more than a few headaches.
12	5	"The Dutch"	Jay Chandrasekhar	Robin Shorr	June 24, 2007	2AKK07	1.52
Sam is invited to lunch with airline-industry power players, including Russ' rival the Dutch. When Sam donates to the Dutch's charity, it leads to unexpected consequences.
13	6	"Lady Business"	Mike Mitchell	Robia Rashid	June 24, 2007	2AKK02	2.66
Sam nominates Meryl for an award for female executives and unexpectedly draws her ire.
14	7	"Stride"	Tommy O'Haver	Theresa Mulligan	June 24, 2007	2AKK04	3.06
Sam is put in charge of a product-placement partnership between the airline and a chewing-gum company. He ends up hooking up with the sales rep (Christine Lakin) and allows the branding to get way out of hand.
15	8	"Crazy Goat"	Roger Nygard	Andy Gordon	July 1, 2007	2AKK03	1.63
Russ pressures his staff to generate some moneymaking ideas. With this in mind, Sam looks to facilitate a business merger by arranging a date between Derek and Darcy.
16	9	"Fatty"	Dennie Gordon	Pam Brady & Will Gluck	July 1, 2007	2AKK01	3.38
Sam wears a fat suit to better understand how obese people experience air travel. During the flight, Russ wants Sam to keep an eye on his girlfriend, who he suspects is cheating.
17	10	"The Stranger"	Millicent Shelton	Sam Laybourne	July 1, 2007	2AKK06	2.99
Sam chooses Russ' friend Ralph (Dale Dye) over Meryl to help him on a project. When the assignment gets out of hand, Sam goes crawling back to Meryl.

== U.S. television ratings ==
Below is a table of the seasonal rankings (based on average total viewers per episode) of The Loop on Fox.

Note: Each U.S. network television season starts in late September and ends in late May, which coincides with the completion of May sweeps.

Season	Episodes	Timeslot (EST)	Premiere	Finale	Viewers (in millions)
1	7	Wednesday 9:30 PM (premiere); Tuesday 9:00 PM	March 15, 2006	April 13, 2006	3.86
2	10	Sunday 8:30 PM and 9:30 PM	June 10, 2007	July 1, 2007	2.36

== Home media ==
The first season of The Loop was released on DVD on March 6, 2007. Bonus features included a featurette with interviews from the cast and crew.

=== International air dates ===
Country	TV network(s)	Series premiere
Argentina	FX Network	March 2007
Australia	Seven Network	December 7, 2006
Australia	The Comedy Channel	July 14, 2009
Brazil	FX Network	September 2007
Canada	CH	March 2006
Croatia	RTL Televizija	March 2009
Finland	MTV3	January 13, 2010
France	NRJ 12	August 25, 2008
Iceland	Stöð 2	2007
(Republic of Ireland) Ireland	RTÉ Two	June 8, 2007
Israel	yes Stars	February 7, 2007
United Kingdom	Trouble	2006
United Kingdom	E4	July 30, 2009
New Zealand	C4	May 19, 2008
Philippines	Jack TV	September 5, 2007
Russia	MTV Russia	December 2009
Ukraine	Novyi Kanal	June 2009
Thailand	True Series	December 19, 2006
Turkey	ComedyMax	January 27, 2008
Slovenia	Kanal A	
(Bahrain) (Egypt) (Iraq) (Jordan) (Kuwait) (Lebanon) (Oman) (Saudi Arabia) (Somalia) (Syria) (Tunisia) (United Arab Emirates) Middle East	Showtime Arabia (ShowComedy)	2007
Mexico	FX	March 2006
