= JJ Villard's Fairy Tales =

American adult animated comedy horror television series

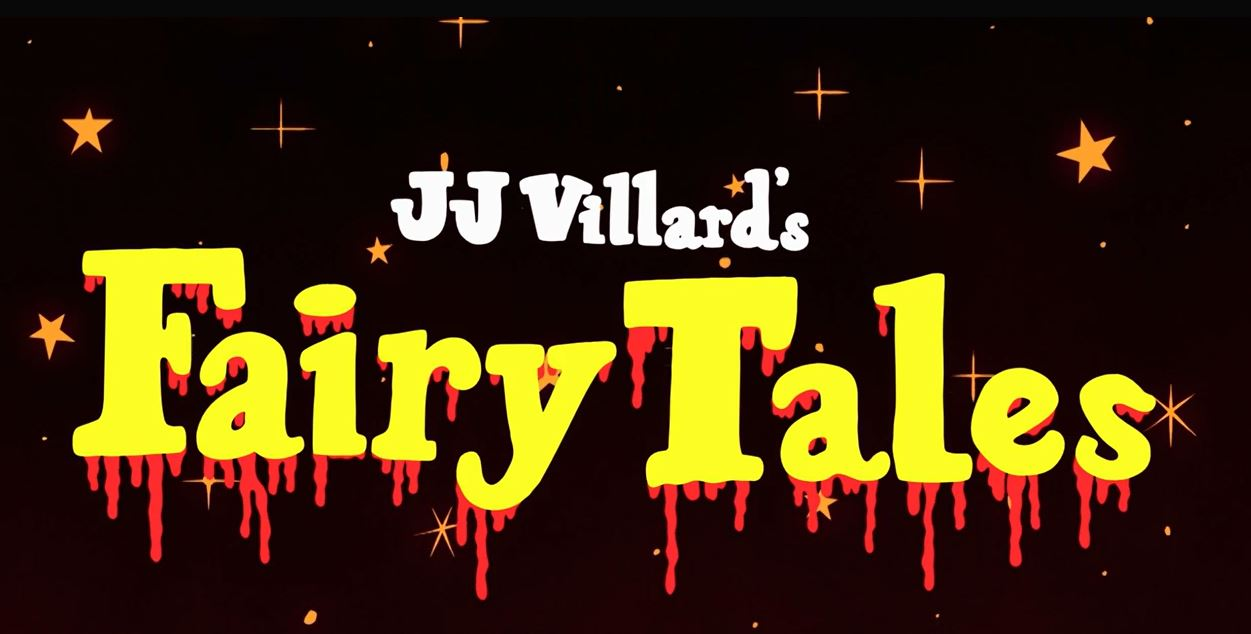
- Genre: Anthology; Comedy horror; Surreal humour; Black comedy; Adult animation
- Created by: JJ Villard
- Written by: James Merrill; Johnny Ryan; JJ Villard
- Directed by: JJ Villard
- Opening theme: "Fichtl's Song" by Die Woody's
- Ending theme: "Fichtl's Song" by Die Woodys
- Composer: Roger Neill
- Country of origin: United States
- Original language: English
- No. of seasons: 1
- No. of episodes: 6

Production
- Executive producers: JJ Villard; Brian A. Miller; Jennifer Pelphrey; Mike Lazzo (Note: Lazzo, Crofford and Newman are executive producers for Williams Street.); Keith Crofford; Walter Newman
- Producer: Janet Dimon (Note: Dimon is supervising producer)
- Animator: Saerom Animation
- Running time: 11 minutes
- Production companies: Villard Film; Cartoon Network Studios; Williams Street

Original release
- Network: Adult Swim
- Release: May 11 – June 15, 2020

JJ Villard's Fairy Tales is an American adult animated comedy horror anthology television series created by JJ Villard for Cartoon Network's nighttime programming block Adult Swim. Produced by Cartoon Network Studios, it aired from May 11 to June 15, 2020.

== Cast ==
In alphabetical order:

- Linda Blair as Grandma Sicario Hernandez / Mama Bear / Goldilox's Mom (Victoria)
- Doug Bradley as Kenneth
- Keith David as Prince Lionel
- Warwick Davis as Rumpelstiltskin
- Robert Englund as Hive Head / Porridge Daddy (Heathcliff) / Toilet
- Corey Feldman as Huntsman (Mike) / Guard / Leechy
- Catherine Hicks as Fairy
- John Kassir as Pinocchio / Gelato
- David Patrick Kelly as the Woodsman
- Heather Langenkamp as Charla
- Ashley Laurence as Jizzelda
- Sheryl Lee as Doreen
- Maika Monroe as Snow White
- Edwin Neal as Wormy / Earwig / Crabby
- Alan Oppenheimer as Bearstein / Mirror Max / Roach / Flea Circus
- Cassandra Peterson as the Queen
- Milly Shapiro as Princess Jezebel / Goldilox
- Jennifer Tilly as Little Red Riding Hood
- Kevin Van Hentenryck as Officer Big Bad Wolf
- JJ Villard as Police Officer (Little Red Riding Hood / Pinocchio) / Cops / Squire / Chaffino
- Peter Weller as Sergeant Hardcop
- Finn Wolfhard as Boypunzel / Manpunzel

== Episodes ==
No.	Title	Directed by	Written by	Original release date	Prod. code	U.S. viewers (millions)
1	"Boypunzel"	J. J. Villard	James Merrill & Johnny Ryan & J. J. Villard	May 11, 2020	101	0.610
2	"The Goldilox Massacre"	J. J. Villard	James Merrill & Johnny Ryan & J. J. Villard	May 18, 2020 (Note: This episode had an advanced stealth premiere on April 1, 2020 as part of Adult Swim's annual April Fools' stunt.)	102	0.332
3	"Little Red Riding Hood"	J. J. Villard	James Merrill & Johnny Ryan & J. J. Villard	May 25, 2020	103	0.511
4	"Pinocchio"	J. J. Villard	James Merrill & Johnny Ryan & J. J. Villard	June 1, 2020	104	0.467
5	"Rumpelstiltskin"	J. J. Villard	James Merrill & Johnny Ryan & J. J. Villard	June 8, 2020	105	0.313
6	"Snow White"	J. J. Villard	James Merrill & Johnny Ryan & J. J. Villard	June 15, 2020	106	0.451
