= Mosbius Designs =

- How I Met Your Mother episode
- Episode no.: Season 4 Episode 20
- Directed by: Pamela Fryman
- Written by: Kourtney Kang
- Original air date: April 13, 2009

Guest appearance
- Ryan Sypek as PJ

Episode chronology
← Previous "Murtaugh"	Next → "The Three Days Rule"
- How I Met Your Mother season 4

"Mosbius Designs" is the 20th episode in the fourth season of the television series How I Met Your Mother and 84th overall. It aired on April 13, 2009. In the episode, Ted starts his own architecture firm while Marshall is worried about his own employment situation. The episode also marks the beginning of Alyson Hannigan's maternity leave; Lily appears only in the cold open.

== Plot ==
In the beginning, Barney, Ted and Marshall are all laughing at a joke that Barney had just told them. When Lily arrives, Barney decides to tell her the dirty joke, despite Ted and Marshall objecting and calling the joke "guy funny". The joke has an unrevealed punch line, with Ted telling his kids that the joke was the dirtiest he had ever heard and that he was not going to tell his kids the joke. Lily then gets up from the booth and walks away, with Ted saying that Lily avoided the group for four weeks.

Ted starts his own architecture firm, Mosbius Designs, and operates it out of his and Robin's apartment. He initially focuses on trivial matters; Robin then urges him to focus on contacting clients, and he hires an intern, PJ (Ryan Sypek). When Barney hears about PJ, he is furious, having assumed Ted would know better and hire an attractive young woman (and also having sent an inappropriate letter and underwear to PJ). Meanwhile, at GNB, Marshall fears he lacks job security, and Barney suggests he ingratiate himself to the office with a gimmick. Marshall decides to run a fantasy baseball league, but quickly becomes overwhelmed by the additional responsibilities and his coworkers' demands.

PJ manages Ted and Robin's apartment like an office; and although Robin is annoyed at him at first, she becomes attracted to his authority and they begin having sex together, including during business hours, which leads Ted to fire PJ. With PJ now focusing all his time and attention on Robin, she feels smothered and breaks things off. Ted re-hires PJ, causing Robin to renew her interest in him. Barney becomes incredibly jealous after hearing of this, and unable to talk it over with Lily, confesses his love of Robin to Marshall, who reveals he already knows.

PJ eventually decides to leave, perversely giving Robin a letter of explanation, and Ted a bouquet of roses. Marshall then hires PJ as a paralegal and delegates the fantasy league to him while retaining credit for it; Barney thanks Marshall for getting PJ away from Robin. Robin gives Ted encouragement on his business and coaches him to call his clients.

== Production ==
The final draft of the episode did not reference the dirty joke from the cold opening, but was later added by Carter Bays as a device explaining the disappearance of Lily, as Alyson Hannigan was entering the final weeks of her pregnancy.

In November 2008, Cobie Smulders and her boyfriend Taran Killam (who plays the character Blauman) announced that they were expecting their first child. Despite the best efforts of the show's writers and costume designers, it was still apparent that Smulders was pregnant, due to some poor camera angles that show her abdomen.

== Critical response ==
The dirty joke in the cold open is a talking point of various critic and fan reviews, that praised the episode's development of the story, even without explicit mention of The Mother.

Donna Bowman of The A.V. Club rated the episode with a grade A.

IGN gave the episode 8.6 out of 10.
