= Old King Clancy =

- How I Met Your Mother episode
- Episode no.: Season 4 Episode 18
- Directed by: Pamela Fryman
- Written by: Jamie Rhonheimer
- Original air date: March 23, 2009

Guest appearances
- Aaron Hill as "The Frozen Snowshoe"; Bryan Callen as Bilson

Episode chronology
← Previous "The Front Porch"	Next → "Murtaugh"
- How I Met Your Mother season 4

"Old King Clancy" is the 18th episode in the fourth season of the television series How I Met Your Mother and 82nd overall. It originally aired on March 23, 2009. In the episode, Ted struggles with his assignment to design Goliath National Bank's new headquarters, while Robin is cagey about an intimate encounter with a Canadian celebrity years earlier.

== Plot ==
In spring 2009, Ted works on the Goliath National Bank (GNB) headquarters. But he chafes at the restrictions set by the executive supervising the project, Bilson (Bryan Callen), who prevents him from incorporating the naturalistic features that excite him. A new task force is put together to supervise Ted, and he feels engaged again; but then he learns that the building was scrapped a month earlier. Barney and Marshall admit that GNB decided to fire Ted due to cutting back on new expenditures to fund their lavish corporate retreats, but the company was contracted to pay him for two more months; Barney and Marshall hired a random group of people to pose as Ted's task force to avoid telling him the truth. Barney is able to get Ted a job designing an exact duplicate of the room in which GNB employees are fired; but when Ted creates an entirely new concept for the project, he is fired in the existing room. After attacking Bilson with a chair, Ted is also fired from his firm and decides to start his own business where he can be free from corporate thinking.

Meanwhile, Robin reveals that a Canadian celebrity once invited her home to see a collection he possessed, but she left after he propositioned her with a specific sex act. Lily is desperate for the specifics, and Robin agrees to divulge the details if the gang can correctly guess the celebrity, the nature of the collection, and the sex act. For three days, everyone continually offers guesses based on fictitious "Canadian sex acts". They finally give up, but Robin reveals that Canadian wrestler "The Frozen Snowshoe" (a fictional person, whom none of Robin's friends have heard of) invited her to see his collection of Harvey's trays (indistinguishable orange trays that are not considered collector's items), and suggested she perform an "Old King Clancy"––King Clancy being a real-life early twentieth-century National Hockey League player––which involves maple syrup. Everyone is disappointed by the obscurity of every element of the story. A flashback to 2002 shows that it was really The Frozen Snowshoe who rejected Robin after she suggested the Old King Clancy.

== Production ==
"Old King Clancy" is based on a true story. One of the show's writers told of an incident involving a friend who had met an American celebrity with a strange collection and also a strange sex proposition. The writers tried to guess who it was, what they collected and the sex act. After spending a lot of time on it, they decided to incorporate the idea into the show.

The website www.canadiansexacts.org is mentioned in the episode. Show staff created the website in reality, but instead of information about the supposed sex acts, it features images of Canadian actor Alan Thicke and messages stating that the webpage is undergoing maintenance. As of May 21st, 2026 this website displays a message stating that the user has been hacked and immediate access is required.

== Critical response ==
Donna Bowman of The A.V. Club gave the episode a B rating.

Michelle Zoromski of IGN gave the episode an 8.5 out of 10, citing the episode's ability "to stay light, even while dealing with topics like Ted losing his job."
