= Sorry, Bro =

- How I Met Your Mother episode
- Episode no.: Season 4 Episode 16
- Directed by: Pamela Fryman
- Written by: Craig Gerard; Matthew Zinman
- Production code: 4ALH16
- Original air date: March 9, 2009

Guest appearances
- Laura Prepon as Karen; David Burtka as Scooter; Laura Ann Kesling as 8-year-old Nicole

Episode chronology
← Previous "The Stinsons"	Next → "The Front Porch"
- How I Met Your Mother season 4

"Sorry, Bro" is the 16th episode in the fourth season of the television series How I Met Your Mother and 80th overall. It originally aired on March 9, 2009.

== Plot ==
At 1:45 am, Robin gets up so she will be in time for her 4 am talk show that she anchors and meets the gang at the bar, as they are still out from the previous night. Ted tells his friends that Karen, his girlfriend during high school and college, is now in town.

Marshall and Lily are not happy with this news. They tell Ted how annoyed they were by Karen's pretentiousness, how Ted imitated her opinions and how Karen always cheated on Ted, left for a few months, and got back together with him, only for the process to begin all over again and again. Although the gang prevents Ted from calling her, Ted reveals that already called her and had lunch with her. The group discusses the four different reasons one would have lunch with an ex: They want to get back together, as depicted in Lily's lunch with Scooter; they want to kill you, depicted in Barney's paranoid interpretation of his lunch with Wendy; they want to give back something you left behind, depicted in Robin's lunch with "The Iron Man"; or they want to show off how well they are doing, depicted in an eight-year-old Marshall having lunch with eight-year-old Nicole.

Ted reveals that he has entered a relationship with Karen, with roommate Robin unaware due to the sleeping pills she has been using to help her keep up with her schedule. Lily is frustrated to hear this, and Ted confronts her about the true reason she hates Karen: while she was painting Marshall in the nude, Karen entered and "lingered" around, keeping her eyes on Marshall. Ted tells them that the gang is wrong about his succumbing to Karen's every whim so easily. While he and Karen were hooking up in her apartment, Karen's boyfriend entered. After the boyfriend left, Ted confronted Karen about how she always cheated rather than ending relationships, and said he never wanted to speak to her again. Karen later dumped the boyfriend. The gang is happy to hear this, but Lily asks Ted how he could know Karen dumped him if he never spoke to her again. Ted quickly says that he and Karen called each other again, patched things up, are now back together and she is coming to the bar. Karen enters the bar and the gang unhappily greets her.

The previous day at work, Marshall was playing basketball with his office colleagues and forgot his suit pants. He called Lily to come over and give him pants. Lily gave the pants to Barney to give to Marshall, but Barney cut them up. Marshall confidently wears the ripped pants to the bar, admitting it shows off his calves.

== Critical response ==
Donna Bowman of The A.V. Club rated the episode with a grade B+.

Michelle Zoromski of IGN gave the episode 8.3 out of 10.

It currently sits at a score of 7.6 stars on IMDB from over 4,000 reviews, which puts it at 153rd out of the 208 episodes that are rated on the website.
