= Right Place, Right Time (How I Met Your Mother) =

- How I Met Your Mother episode
- Episode no.: Season 4 Episode 22
- Directed by: Pamela Fryman
- Written by: Stephen Lloyd
- Original air date: May 4, 2009

Guest appearances
- Sarah Chalke as Stella Zinman; Dan Castellaneta as Milt; John Duerler as Harlen Johnsen; Joel McCrary as Ged Wilkinson; Lyndsy Fonseca as Daughter; Mary Ann Jarou as Jenny; Kurt Long as Galoshes the Weather Clown; Bianca Lopez as Gennie; Kit Pongetti as Fran

Episode chronology
← Previous "The Three Days Rule"	Next → "As Fast as She Can"
- How I Met Your Mother season 4

"Right Place, Right Time" is the 22nd episode of the fourth season of How I Met Your Mother and 86th overall. It aired on May 4, 2009. Barney plans to achieve his goal of sleeping with 200 women by sleeping with a Czech supermodel, but Robin points out that he has miscounted.

== Plot ==
The show opens with Ted Mosby walking down a street with a yellow umbrella, stopping at a newsstand, giving some cash to a homeless man, and stopping at a crosswalk before a woman's hand reaches over and touches his shoulder.

Ted complains to Robin about his lack of inspiration for his new project of designing a building shaped like a Stetson hat for a chain restaurant company. Robin suggests that he leave the house to clear his mind, and he agrees to go out for a bagel. Robin warns Ted that it will rain, and Ted brings an umbrella with him. Instead of going to his favorite bagel shop, Schlegel's Bagels, Ted goes to his second favorite bagel shop because Robin had come down with food poisoning from eating at Schlegel's.

At Ted's apartment, Barney shows Ted a magazine called Bro's Life, boasting to Ted that he will be going out with Petra Petrova, a supermodel featured in the issue. Barney declares that he will meet his goal of having sex with 200 women. Barney explains how a bully named Matthew Panning had taunted him, saying he had been with "a hundred girls", and Barney retorted that he would be with 200 women someday.

Reading over the list of women Barney had slept with, Robin discovers that Barney had counted the same woman twice, meaning that Barney was actually at 198, not 199. Hearing this, he runs to his gym and sleeps with a female bodybuilder. Later, Robin tells him that he had used a number twice in his list, so the bodybuilder was actually number 200.

Talking about the 200 women Barney had slept with, Marshall presents professionally made charts, showing Barney's low "batting average", noting that only 1.2 percent of the women he approaches actually have sex with him. This leads to Marshall's addiction to the charts that the GNB graphics department makes up for him. Marshall later discovers the gang threw away all his charts, including the ones necessary for an important meeting on tax shelters.

Ted agrees to retrieve the charts, but finds them in the possession of an odd homeless man called Milt (Dan Castellaneta), who agrees to sell them for one million dollars. Ted negotiates to pay him on a dollar-a-day basis. After stopping at the newsstand, Ted crosses the street to give the man a dollar and continues down the street to a crosswalk. As he waits, he is tapped on the shoulder by a woman's hand. The camera turns to reveal that Stella is the woman behind Ted at the crosswalk.

The episode concludes with Barney gloating to Matthew Panning over his success. He discovers that Panning is now happily married with kids, and he feels sorry that Barney has spent his adult life outdoing a lie he told in middle school. After Panning leaves, Barney tears up the list and ponders what he will do next. He then turns to see Robin.

== Production ==
"Right Place, Right Time" was written by Stephen Lloyd and directed by Pamela Fryman. The episode features series regulars Josh Radnor as Ted Mosby, Jason Segel as Marshall Eriksen, Neil Patrick Harris as Barney Stinson, and Cobie Smulders as Robin Scherbatsky. Alyson Hannigan does not appear as Lily Aldrin as she was pregnant at the time of filming.

Writer Chris Harris used to work on Late Show with David Letterman alongside the creators of How I Met Your Mother Craig Thomas and Carter Bays. In this episode, Harris used a bit originally written for Letterman's "Charts and Graphs" section that was never used.

== Critical response ==
Donna Bowman of The A.V. Club rated the episode B+. Michelle Zoromski of IGN gave the episode 8.5 out of 10.
