= Not a Father's Day =

- How I Met Your Mother episode
- Episode no.: Season 4 Episode 7
- Directed by: Pamela Fryman
- Written by: Robia Rashid
- Production code: 4ALH07
- Original air date: November 10, 2008

Guest appearances
- Michael Hagiwara as Mr. Li; Michael Antosy as Recruit; Elena K. Smith as Ted's Cousin; Dan Lauria as Nolan; Danièle Watts as Lori; Lindsey Stoddart as Charlotte; Michael McCafferty as Cabbie

Episode chronology
← Previous "Happily Ever After"	Next → "Woooo!"
- How I Met Your Mother season 4

"Not a Father's Day" is the seventh episode in the fourth season of the television series How I Met Your Mother and 71st overall. It originally aired on November 10, 2008. The creators of the show brought HIMYM into the real world with a website that shared the name of this episode: NotaFathersDay.com, where they sold the "Who's Not Your Daddy" t-shirts.

== Plot ==
In the bar, Barney is unimpressed with the women there, not seeing anyone attractive. Ted points out a group of women in the corner who they agree are hot, but Barney states they are simply experiencing the "cheerleader effect": as a group, they look hot, but seen individually each one is actually unattractive. As he concludes this observation, Barney receives a call, in which he is told he is going to be a father. Not wanting to have kids, he panics and prays to God for help when he receives news that the woman is not actually pregnant. He is so happy he dances down the street to Marshall's office, where he announces he is going to create a holiday for childless men like him called "Not a Father's Day". He produces merchandise, including T-shirts, mugs and cards, and the holiday gains a large following.

Marshall and Lily notice babies everywhere, and have a discussion about having children. Lily tries to point out possible problems, but Marshall is too caught up in how cute babies are. They decide to have a baby, but are soon interrupted by Robin, who is living with them while she looks for a job and apartment. They ask her to stay at Ted's while they have a romantic evening and she reluctantly agrees.

Marshall is told by his boss that he needs to be at a conference that night and so cannot spend the night with Lily. After telling her about this, Lily begins to think seriously about having kids and starts to panic. She asks Ted and Robin over to her apartment to help her decide, with Ted supporting the idea to have a baby and Robin opposing it. Lily says that Marshall only focuses on the positive, while she sees problems they might have after speaking with other new parents. Robin says that although Ted does not have children, he often lectures the rest of the group and tells bad jokes like a father would. Ted replies that Robin is afraid of babies, not wanting to hold them and letting them sniff her like a dog.

Lily gets drunk and after seeing their neighbor's baby's sock, decides to have a baby and runs out while Ted and Robin are arguing. As Marshall prepares for his conference, he finds a drunk Lily in his office, ready to make a baby. She quickly causes trouble, pulling out Marshall's files, throwing up in his trash bin, dancing around, and stripping in the background of his presentation. While trying to find Lily, Ted and Robin continue to argue over kids, with Robin pointing out all the problems they cause, while Lily illustrates them until Marshall puts her in a cab to get her to fall asleep and take her home.

Ted and Robin go to the bar and encounter Barney's Not a Father’s Day group, proudly celebrating the fact they are childless. When Robin goes to look for Lily in the bathroom, Ted answers her phone and Marshall tells him he has Lily. While putting her phone back, Ted finds the baby's sock in Robin's bag. While she denies it at first, Robin eventually admits that she took the sock, saying she is confused at the moment, having no place to live. Ted invites her to move in with him while she looks for a place and she accepts. Barney tells Ted and Robin how proud he is of the holiday he created, but Ted tells him it is a day for losers and he himself is experiencing the cheerleader effect, and individually, the guys are all geeks and weirdos who are not childless by choice. They leave Barney in the bar with this revelation, where he finds the sock and sees how cute it is.

The next morning, Lily tells Marshall she sees now that he is ready for a baby as he took care of her so well when she was drunk the night before. Marshall says he is not ready to balance work and children, so they decide to wait a bit longer.

As the episode ends, Barney is seen at the karaoke bar, tearfully singing "Cat's in the Cradle" while holding the sock.

== Production ==
The episode had the title "Jeremy's Sock" but was changed to "Not a Father's Day".

== Critical response ==
Eric Goldman of IGN gave the episode 8.5 out of 10.

Donna Bowman of The A.V. Club gave the episode a B+.
