= The Stinsons =

- How I Met Your Mother episode
- Episode no.: Season 4 Episode 15
- Directed by: Pamela Fryman
- Written by: Carter Bays; Craig Thomas
- Production code: 4ALH15
- Original air date: March 2, 2009

Guest appearances
- Zachary Gordon as Grant; Brooke D'Orsay as Margaret; Frances Conroy as Loretta Stinson

Episode chronology
← Previous "The Possimpible"	Next → "Sorry, Bro"
- How I Met Your Mother season 4

"The Stinsons" is the 15th episode in the fourth season of the television series How I Met Your Mother and 79th overall. It originally aired on March 2, 2009.

== Plot ==
At the beginning of the episode, Barney is seen skipping out hitting on a hot girl because he tells everyone he has to go somewhere, but he is secretive about where. The gang becomes suspicious that Barney might have a secret girlfriend, so they follow him to what turns out to be the house of his mother, Loretta. Barney then reveals that he has a wife, Betty, and a son, Tyler. Barney then tells the gang that their real names are Margaret and Grant and that they are both actors he hired because his mother was dying and he thought it would make her happy to think he was married. When his mother recovered, Barney was stuck with the fake family. Marshall at first argues that Barney should tell his mother the truth because there should not be secrets within families. After he discovers that Lily hates his mother, who insulted her at their wedding, Marshall starts to think that some things are better left unsaid. Meanwhile, Robin bonds with Grant because of their shared lack of passion in their careers; Robin being unsure about starting her morning show near the beginning of her thirties and Grant being frustrated about the lack of freedom in his acting roles.

Ted and Margaret begin to develop a connection, since they are both fascinated by theatre. Margaret gives Ted some acting tips, after he reveals becoming an actor has always been a secret ambition of his. After dinner, Ted is caught kissing Margaret, and Barney is forced to confront him in front of his mother, with Grant doing a tearful and moving performance of a kid who does not want his parents to divorce. However, the tables are turned when Ted starts using Margaret's acting tips to improvise a story that Barney long ago stole his fiancée. Robin later congratulates Grant on his passionate performance and he assures her that she will find some passion in her new job. She is appreciative but is left horrified when he tries to kiss her.

Barney then finally tells his mother the truth, and she is relieved because she admits she hates Margaret and Grant, particularly Grant's catchphrase "Tyler no likey!". After that moment, they share a hug and she tells him to make sure to go for it when he does meet the right girl. At that moment, Robin walks in and Barney looks at her as he tells his mother he will try. On the ride home, Ted and Margaret are in one cab while Barney, Robin, Marshall and Lily are in another. Lily then fakes a conversation on her cell phone with Margaret pretending to be Marshall's mother in order to make him think she is on good terms with his mother.

== Critical response ==
"The Stinsons" received positive reviews from critics. Donna Bowman of The A.V. Club gave the episode an "A-", praising Neil Patrick Harris's performance and the balance of absurdity with emotional depth. She described it as "a broad and very funny package".

Michelle Zoromski of IGN gave the episode an 8.6/10, highlighting its clever writing and nods to classic sitcoms. She commended the humor and emotional layers, noting how it revealed new aspects of Barney's character while maintaining the show's wit.
