= Bret Harrison =

American actor (born 1982)

- Born: Bret Michael Harrison; April 6, 1982 (age 44); Portland, Oregon, U.S.
- Occupation: Actor
- Years active: 1999–present
- Spouse: Lauren Zelman (m. 2012)
- Children: 1

Bret Michael Harrison (born April 6, 1982) is an American actor. He is known predominantly for his work on comedy television series such as Grounded for Life, The Loop, Reaper, and Breaking In.

== Early life ==
Harrison was born in Portland, Oregon. In his senior year, he attended Tualatin High School in Tualatin, Oregon. His first acting role came at the Hillsboro Artists' Regional Theatre in his home state where he had the role of George in Our Town.

== Career ==
=== Acting ===
One of his first TV appearances was in the third season of MTV's Undressed and the MTV film Everybody's Doing It. In 2002, Harrison appeared as Lonny in the movie Orange County. His first major role was dorky next-door neighbor Brad O'Keefe on Grounded for Life. In 2004, Harrison starred as Green Graves in the coming of age drama film Lightning Bug.

Harrison appeared in four episodes of That '70s Show as Charlie Richardson, a character intended to be a replacement for departing cast member Topher Grace but Harrison decided to work on another series. He appeared in The O.C. as Danny, Seth's rival. He had a dramatic guest role on Law & Order: Special Victims Unit as Sam Cavanaugh, a young victim of sexual abuse. In film, he appeared alongside Jack Black and Colin Hanks in Orange County. In addition, Harrison also starred in the movie Deal, which was released in the US on April 26, 2008. During 2006–2007 he starred in The Loop, as a young professional trying to balance the needs of his social life with the pressures of working at the corporate headquarters of a major U.S. airline. It was canceled following the second season in 2007. Later in 2007, he became the star of The CW series, Reaper as Sam Oliver. Reaper was canceled on May 19, 2009, after two seasons.

Bret Harrison played Dr. Sidney Miller on ABC's re-imagined V series. Harrison's character appears throughout Season 2 (2011) as an evolutionary biologist and eventual member of the counter-visitor resistance. Harrison starred as Jerry in a short film titled Cost of Living co-starring Brandon Routh. He starred as Scottie Smith in the road trip comedy film Mardi Gras: Spring Break. Also in 2011, he was signed by Fox to fill a main cast role in a mid-season replacement comedy called Breaking In.

In 2015, Harrison signed on to play Gordon Cooper on ABC's The Astronaut Wives Club and played the role of Barry Burwood in movie See You in Valhalla. In 2016, Harrison had a recurring role as Kenny in the Netflix sitcom series The Ranch. In 2017, Harrison guest starred as Brad in an episode of Mom and in 2018, he guest starred as Sam Oliver in an episode of Kevin (Probably) Saves the World.

=== Music ===
Big Japan is a four-piece indie rock band from Los Angeles, with Nathanial Castro on vocals and guitar, Adam Brody on drums, Harrison on guitar and Brad Babinski on bass. The band only performs, writes and records sporadically given Brody and Harrison's unpredictable acting schedules. Their first band name was Steven's Team, named after the film The Cable Guy.

Big Japan's first release, Music for Dummies, was digitally released through Nightshift Records on August 23, 2005. This CD originally titled Music for Dummies was changed to Untitled thus the limited number of CDs printed have become collector's items.

== Personal life ==
As a child, Harrison began studying acting with acting coach Sandra Peabody. Harrison reflects, "I met a lady named Sandra Peabody, who teaches through Northwest Children's Theater. Ever since I met her, she showed me what acting was really about. When I started realizing how much more went into it, that's when I was like, 'I love this, this is a challenge.' She's the one who said, 'Hey, you gotta go to L.A.'" Harrison began dating Lauren Zelman in 2005. They married on March 25, 2012, and have a son.

== Filmography ==
Film
Year	Title	Role	Notes
1999	A Place Apart	Wilkey	Television film
2002	Orange County	Lonny	
2002	Everybody's Doing It	Travis	Television film
2003	Home Security	Mike	Short film
2004	Lightning Bug	Green Graves	
2008	Deal	Alex Stillman	
2011	The Chicago 8	Rennie Davis	
2011	Cost of Living	Jerry	Short film
2011	Mardi Gras: Spring Break	Scottie Smith	
2015	See You in Valhalla	Barry Burwood	
2021	Hero Mode	George Mayfield	

Television
Year	Title	Role	Notes
2000	Undressed	Skeet	7 episodes
2001–05	Grounded for Life	Brad O'Keefe	Guest star (seasons 1–2); main cast (seasons 3–5); 63 episodes
2002	Law & Order: Special Victims Unit	Sam Cavanaugh	Episode: "Guilt"
2003	Boston Public	Doug Baer	Episode: "Chapter Fifty-Six"
2004–05	The O.C.	Danny	Episode: "The Rivals"
2004–05	The O.C.	Swerve	Uncredited; episode: "The Return of the Nana"
2005	That '70s Show	Charlie Richardson	4 episodes
2006–07	The Loop	Sam Sullivan	Main cast; 17 episodes
2007–09	Reaper	Samuel "Sam" Oliver	Main cast; 31 episodes
2011	V	Dr. Sidney Miller	6 episodes
2011–12	Breaking In	Cameron Price	Main cast; 20 episodes
2011	Love Bites	Charlie	2 episodes
2015	The Astronaut Wives Club	Gordon Cooper	Main cast; 10 episodes
2016, 2020	The Ranch	Kenny	Recurring role, 11 episodes
2017	Mom	Brad	Episode: "Tantric Sex and the Sprouted Flute"
2018	Kevin (Probably) Saves the World	Samuel "Sam" Oliver	Episode: "Old Friends"
2020	All Rise	Ben Benner	Episode: "My Fair Lockdown"
2020	El Candidato	Boyd Sorenson	Recurring role
