= Ashley Laurence =

American actress

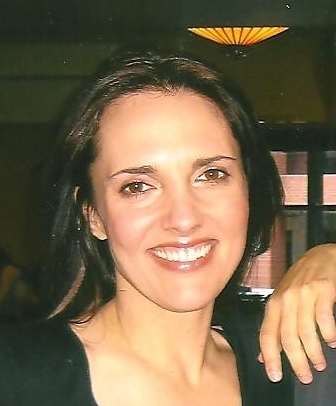
- Laurence in 2009
- Born: Lori Ashley Cohen; May 28, 1966 (age 60); Los Angeles, California, U.S.
- Occupation: Actress
- Years active: 1984–present
- Known for: Hellraiser franchise

Lori Ashley Cohen (born May 28, 1966), known professionally as Ashley Laurence, is an American actress and visual artist. She made her film debut in 1987 as the lead character, Kirsty Cotton, in Clive Barker's horror film Hellraiser (1987), a role she later reprised in Hellbound: Hellraiser II (1988), Hellraiser III: Hell on Earth (1992), and Hellraiser: Hellseeker (2002). The film franchise established her as a prominent actress in horror, and she subsequently starred in Mikey (1992) and Lurking Fear (1994). She is widely regarded as a "Scream queen."

Laurence's other notable film roles include Jenny Graves in Lightning Bug (2004) and Mrs. McCormack in Red (2008). In addition to film, Laurence has had guest appearances on several television series including Hercules: The Legendary Journeys (1996), Suddenly Susan (1997), and Beverly Hills, 90210 (1999).

Laurence made her voice acting debut as Missy Carter in the video game The Vanishing of Ethan Carter (2014). Six years later, she returned to voice acting for the animated comedy television series JJ Villard's Fairy Tales (2020) which premiered on Adult Swim.

She was confirmed to appear on the second season of the Shudder anthology series Creepshow (2021).

== Career ==
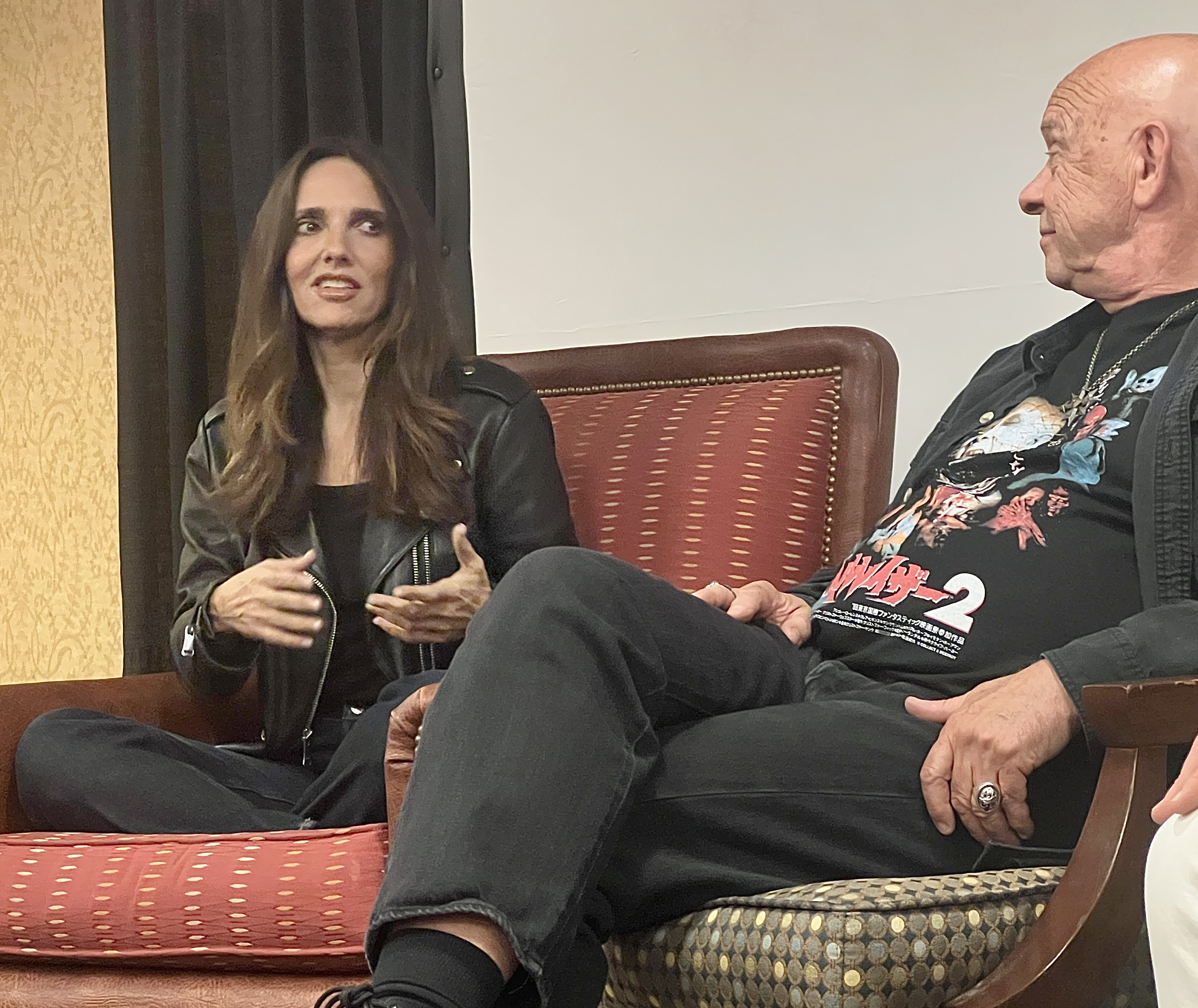
Ashley Laurence sits next to Doug Bradley at a convention in Seattle on May 3, 2025.

Laurence began her career with guest roles on television series. In 1984, she made her acting debut with a recurring role on the CBS soap opera Capitol as Brenda Clegg. In 1986, Laurence had a guest appearance as Genna in an episode of the television series Highway to Heaven. In 1987, she made her film debut as the heroine Kirsty Cotton in Clive Barker's Hellraiser (1987). She starred alongside Clare Higgins and Doug Bradley as Pinhead. The film was a critical and commercial success, earning more than $14 million at the American box office. When discussing how she obtained the part, in a retrospective interview Laurence credited Barker for her being cast as the lead, stating:

"I had been in a teenage drama workshop because I had a crush on a boy. I took this workshop and a girl who works there who was also interning at New World at the time said they were casting this movie and couldn't find the lead. They had gone to Chicago, New York and Los Angeles. She had called me and asked me if I would go down and audition for this film and it was the day that Clive Barker and Chris Haig were going back to England that day. So I went over there and I read and Clive was terrific and he said 'Would you retest for this?' So they flew me to England and had me retest and said 'I am going to have to fight for you because the studio wanted a name, but to me you are Kirsty!' I got it because he fought for me."

In 1988, Laurence reprised her role as Kirsty in Tony Randel's sequel Hellbound: Hellraiser II. In 1989, Laurence guest-starred on the television series Monsters and Hunter.

In 1990, Laurence portrayed Jane in the film Face the Edge. In 1992, she appeared in the films Deuce Coupe, Hellraiser III: Hell on Earth, and Mikey. In 2000, Laurence starred in the film Cypress Edge and guest-starred on an episode of Beyond Belief: Fact or Fiction.

In 1994, Laurence starred in Lurking Fear and Stranger by Night. In 1995, she starred in the martial arts Western Savate. The same year, she guest-starred on Legends and appeared in the television films Triplecross and American Cop. In 1996, Laurence starred in the film Livers Ain't Cheap and guest-starred on Hercules: The Legendary Journeys.

I am an oil painter and I like to do my paintings and create layers and it is my job to do the same thing with characters and I haven’t always had the right opportunity to do that. In this instance I was and that was very exciting for me. I got to create a full human being instead of just saying lines.

— Laurence on preparing for her role in Lightning Bug

In 1997, she starred as Jennifer Taylor in the film Cupid and guest starred on the television series Suddenly Susan. In 1999, Laurence portrayed Janine DeVrie in the thriller film A Murder of Crows and Kris Miller in the horror film Warlock III: The End of Innocence. The same year, she guest starred on the television series Beverly Hills, 90210.

In 2002, Laurence reprised her role as Kirsty Cotton in the horror film Hellraiser: Hellseeker and portrayed Dakota in the television film Gentle Ben. The following year, she reprised her role as Dakota in the television film sequel Gentle Ben 2: Danger on the Mountain. In 2004, she portrayed Jenny Graves in the drama film Lightning Bug and had a guest role on the television series ER.

In 2008, she appeared in the drama film Red, based on the novel by Jack Ketchum. In 2009, Laurence appeared in Slipknot's music video for their song "Snuff". In 2014, Laurence made her voice-over debut in the video game The Vanishing of Ethan Carter. In 2016, Laurence starred in the film The Green Fairy.

In 2021, Laurence was confirmed to star alongside Keith David and Josh McDermitt in the upcoming second season of Shudder's anthology series Creepshow (2021).

== Filmography ==
=== Film ===
Year	Title	Role	Notes
1987	Hellraiser	Kirsty Cotton	
1988	Hellbound: Hellraiser II	Kirsty Cotton	
1990	Face the Edge	Jane	
1992	Mikey	Shawn Gilder	
1992	Deuce Coupe	Marie Vitelli	
1992	Hellraiser III: Hell on Earth	Kirsty Cotton	
1994	Lurking Fear	Cathryn Farrell	
1994	Stranger by Night	Nicole Miller	Direct-to-video
1995	Savate	Mary Parker	Direct-to-video
1995	Felony	Laura Bryant	
1996	Livers Ain't Cheap	Carla	
1997	Cupid	Jennifer Taylor	
1998	A Murder of Crows	Janine DeVrie	
1999	Warlock III: The End of Innocence	Kris Miller	Direct-to-video
2000	Cypress Edge	Brittany Trummel	
2002	Hellraiser: Hellseeker	Kirsty Cotton Gooden	Direct-to-video
2004	Lightning Bug	Jenny Graves	
2004	Tomb of Terror	Cathryn Farrell	Segment: "Lurking Fear"; Archive footage
2007	Chill	Maria	Direct-to-video
2008	Red	Mrs. McCormack	
2015	The Green Fairy	Rachel	

=== Television ===
Year	Title	Role	Notes
1984-1985	Capitol	Brenda Clegg	
1986	Highway to Heaven	Genna	Episode: "Sail Away"
1989	Monsters	Jodie	Episode: "The Match Game"
1989	Hunter	Erica	Episode: "Investment in Death"
1995	Legend	Libbie Custer	Episode: "Custer's Next to Last Stand"
1995	Triplecross	Julia Summers	TV film
1995	American Cop	Gina	TV film
1996	Hercules: The Legendary Journeys	Daniela	Episode: "Protean Challenge"
1997	Suddenly Susan	Pam	Episode: "The Ways and Means"
1999	Beverly Hills, 90210	Ashley Reese	Episode: "Fortune Cookie"
2000	Beyond Belief: Fact or Fiction	Sandy	Episode: "Damsel"
2002	Gentle Ben	Dakota	TV film
2003	Gentle Ben 2: Danger on the Mountain	Dakota	TV film
2004	ER	Campbell	Episode: "Just a Touch"
2005	Mystery Woman: Sing Me a Murder	Francine	TV film
2020	JJ Villard's Fairy Tales	Jizzelda	Voice Role; Episode: "Rumpelstiltskin"
2021	Creepshow	Brenda Lanchester	Episode: "Pesticide"

=== Music videos ===
Title	Year	Performer(s)	Notes
"Snuff"	2009	Slipknot	
"Unholy Manipulator"	2012	Product of Hate	Remastered in 2015 as "The Unholy Manipulator"

=== Video games ===
Year	Title	Role	Notes
2014	The Vanishing of Ethan Carter	Missy Carter	Voice role
