= List of That '70s Show episodes =

That '70s Show is an American comedy television series that originally aired on Fox for 200 episodes and four specials across eight seasons, from August 23, 1998, to May 18, 2006. The series spans the years 1976 through the end of 1979.

Series screenwriters included Philip Stark, Mark Hudis, Jeff and Jackie Filgo, Will Forte, Gregg Mettler, Dean Batali, and series creators Bonnie and Terry Turner. All episodes following the pilot were directed by David Trainer. For seasons 5–8, episodes were titled after song names from various 1970s British rock bands: fifth-season episodes are named after songs by Led Zeppelin, sixth season titles are The Who songs, all seventh season titles are from The Rolling Stones and, except for the finale, eighth season titles are Queen songs.

The entire series of 200 episodes has been released on Regions 1, 2 and 4 DVD, and in 2015, the series was released on Blu-ray.

== Series overview ==
Season	Episodes	Originally released	
Season	Episodes	First released	Last released
1	25	August 23, 1998	July 26, 1999
2	26	September 28, 1999	May 22, 2000
3	25	October 3, 2000	May 22, 2001
4	27	September 25, 2001	May 21, 2002
5	25	September 17, 2002	May 14, 2003
6	25	October 29, 2003	May 19, 2004
7	25	September 8, 2004	May 18, 2005
8	22	November 2, 2005	May 18, 2006

== Episodes ==
=== Season 1 (1998–1999) ===
No. overall	No. in season	Title	Directed by	Written by	Original release date	Prod. code	Viewers (millions)
1	1	"That '70s Pilot"	Terry Hughes	Bonnie Turner & Terry Turner & Mark Brazill	August 23, 1998	101	12.56
2	2	"Eric's Birthday"	David Trainer	Bonnie Turner & Terry Turner	August 30, 1998	102	11.12
3	3	"Streaking"	David Trainer	Eric Gilliland	September 6, 1998	103	7.03
4	4	"Battle of the Sexists"	David Trainer	Joshua Sternin & Jeffrey Ventimilia	September 20, 1998	104	10.84
5	5	"Eric's Burger Job"	David Trainer	Mark Brazill	September 27, 1998	106	10.28
6	6	"The Keg"	David Trainer	Dave Schiff	October 25, 1998	107	10.19
7	7	"That Disco Episode"	David Trainer	Bonnie Turner & Terry Turner	November 8, 1998	109	12.83
8	8	"Drive-In"	David Trainer	Mark Hudis	November 15, 1998	108	11.73
9	9	"Thanksgiving"	David Trainer	Jackie Behan & Jeff Filgo	November 22, 1998	110	11.50
10	10	"Sunday, Bloody Sunday"	David Trainer	Linda Wallem	November 29, 1998	105	11.25
11	11	"Eric's Buddy"	David Trainer	Philip Stark	December 6, 1998	114	11.39
12	12	"The Best Christmas Ever" "That '70s Christmas"	David Trainer	Terry Turner & Philip Stark	December 13, 1998	113	12.29
13	13	"Ski Trip"	David Trainer	Jeff Filgo & Jackie Behan	January 17, 1999	115	13.20
14	14	"Stolen Car"	David Trainer	Mark Hudis	January 24, 1999	117	10.82
15	15	"That Wrestling Show"	David Trainer	Jeff Filgo & Jackie Behan	February 7, 1999	119	13.25
16	16	"First Date"	David Trainer	Mark Brazill	February 14, 1999	116	11.37
17	17	"The Pill"	David Trainer	Linda Wallem	February 21, 1999	118	14.09
18	18	"Career Day"	David Trainer	Joshua Sternin & Jeffrey Ventimilia	February 28, 1999	111	11.73
19	19	"Prom Night"	David Trainer	Philip Stark	March 7, 1999	121	12.30
20	20	"A New Hope"	David Trainer	Joshua Sternin & Jeffrey Ventimilia	March 14, 1999	122	11.75
21	21	"Water Tower"	David Trainer	Story by : Linda Wallem; Teleplay by : Jeff Filgo & Jackie Behan	June 14, 1999	123	6.78
22	22	"Punk Chick"	David Trainer	Dave Schiff	June 21, 1999	120	6.28
23	23	"Grandma's Dead"	David Trainer	Arthur F. Montmorency	July 12, 1999	112	7.35
24	24	"Hyde Moves In"	David Trainer	Mark Hudis	July 19, 1999	124	7.04
25	25	"The Good Son"	David Trainer	Arthur F. Montmorency	July 26, 1999	125	7.58

=== Season 2 (1999–2000) ===
No. overall	No. in season	Title	Directed by	Written by	Original release date	Prod. code	Viewers (millions)
26	1	"Garage Sale"	David Trainer	Dave Schiff	September 28, 1999	204	11.25
27	2	"Red's Last Day"	David Trainer	Mark Brazill	October 5, 1999	201	8.82
28	3	"The Velvet Rope"	David Trainer	Joshua Sternin & Jeffrey Ventimilia	October 12, 1999	202	10.46
29	4	"Laurie and the Professor"	David Trainer	Linda Wallem	October 19, 1999	203	8.77
30	5	"Halloween"	David Trainer	Joshua Sternin & Jeffrey Ventimilia	October 26, 1999	208	8.95
31	6	"Vanstock"	David Trainer	Arthur F. Montmorency	November 2, 1999	210	9.08
32	7	"I Love Cake"	David Trainer	Jeff Filgo & Jackie Filgo	November 9, 1999	205	7.83
33	8	"Sleepover"	David Trainer	Dean Batali & Rob DesHotel	November 16, 1999	207	9.58
34	9	"Eric Gets Suspended"	David Trainer	Philip Stark	November 30, 1999	209	8.43
35	10	"Red's Birthday"	David Trainer	Mark Hudis	December 7, 1999	206	8.48
36	11	"Laurie Moves Out"	David Trainer	John Schwab	December 14, 1999	211	8.43
37	12	"Eric's Stash"	David Trainer	Chris Peterson	January 11, 2000	213	9.01
38	13	"Hunting"	David Trainer	Mark Brazill	January 18, 2000	212	9.37
39	14	"Red's New Job"	David Trainer	Jeff Filgo & Jackie Filgo	February 1, 2000	215	8.72
40	15	"Burning Down the House"	David Trainer	Dave Schiff	February 7, 2000	216	8.94
41	16	"The First Time"	David Trainer	Mark Hudis	February 14, 2000	217	9.30
42	17	"Afterglow"	David Trainer	Joshua Sternin & Jeffrey Ventimilia	February 21, 2000	218	10.00
43	18	"Kitty and Eric's Night Out"	David Trainer	Linda Wallem	February 28, 2000	214	9.44
44	19	"Parents Find Out"	David Trainer	Mark Hudis	March 7, 2000	222	9.03
45	20	"Kiss of Death"	David Trainer	Rob des Hotel & Dean Batali	March 20, 2000	219	11.91
46	21	"Kelso's Serenade"	David Trainer	Linda Wallem	March 27, 2000	220	11.78
47	22	"Jackie Moves On"	David Trainer	Philip Stark	April 3, 2000	221	8.75
48	23	"Holy Crap!"	David Trainer	Rob des Hotel & Dean Batali	May 1, 2000	223	8.56
49	24	"Red Fired Up"	David Trainer	Dave Schiff	May 8, 2000	224	9.56
50	25	"Cat Fight Club"	David Trainer	Philip Stark	May 15, 2000	225	8.40
51	26	"Moon Over Point Place"	David Trainer	Jeff Filgo & Jackie Filgo	May 22, 2000	226	8.09

=== Season 3 (2000–2001) ===
No. overall	No. in season	Title	Directed by	Written by	Original release date	Prod. code	Viewers (millions)
52	1	"Reefer Madness"	David Trainer	Joshua Sternin & Jeffrey Ventimilia	October 3, 2000	301	11.92
53	2	"Red Sees Red"	David Trainer	Linda Wallem	October 10, 2000	302	11.80
54	3	"Hyde's Father"	David Trainer	John Schwab	October 17, 2000	304	10.41
55	4	"Too Old to Trick or Treat, Too Young to Die"	David Trainer	Jeff Filgo & Jackie Filgo	October 31, 2000	303	8.80
56	5	"Roller Disco"	David Trainer	Mark Hudis	November 14, 2000	305	9.97
57	6	"Eric's Panties"	David Trainer	Dean Batali & Rob Deshotel	November 21, 2000	307	11.10
58	7	"Baby Fever"	David Trainer	Kristin Newman	November 28, 2000	306	11.59
59	8	"Jackie Bags Hyde"	David Trainer	Dave Schiff	December 12, 2000	308	11.62
60	9	"Hyde's Christmas Rager"	David Trainer	Mark Hudis	December 19, 2000	311	11.92
61	10	"Ice Shack"	David Trainer	Philip Stark	January 9, 2001	309	13.16
62	11	"Who Wants It More?"	David Trainer	Joshua Sternin & Jeffrey Ventimilia	January 10, 2001	314	11.67
63	12	"Fez Gets The Girl"	David Trainer	Chris Peterson & Bryan Moore	January 16, 2001	310	12.59
64	13	"Dine and Dash"	David Trainer	Jackie Filgo & Jeff Filgo	January 30, 2001	312	12.93
65	14	"Radio Daze"	David Trainer	Dave Schiff	February 6, 2001	315	11.89
66	15	"Donna's Panties"	David Trainer	Dean Batali & Rob Deshotel	February 13, 2001	313	12.42
67	16	"Romantic Weekend"	David Trainer	Jackie Filgo & Jeff Filgo	February 20, 2001	316	12.15
68	17	"Kitty's Birthday (Is That Today?!)"	David Trainer	Bryan Moore & Chris Peterson	February 27, 2001	317	10.08
69	18	"The Trials of Michael Kelso"	David Trainer	Philip Stark	March 13, 2001	318	10.75
70	19	"Eric's Naughty No-No"	David Trainer	Kristin Newman	March 27, 2001	319	11.21
71	20	"Holy Craps!"	David Trainer	Mark Hudis	April 17, 2001	320	10.11
72	21	"Fez Dates Donna"	David Trainer	Dean Batali & Rob Deshotel	May 1, 2001	321	9.54
73	22	"Eric's Drunken Tattoo"	David Trainer	Jeffrey Ventimilia & Joshua Sternin	May 1, 2001	322	11.02
74	23	"Canadian Road Trip"	David Trainer	Dave Schiff	May 8, 2001	324	8.97
75	24	"Backstage Pass"	David Trainer	Philip Stark	May 15, 2001	323	10.22
76	25	"The Promise Ring"	David Trainer	Jeff Filgo & Jackie Filgo	May 22, 2001	325	10.56

=== Season 4 (2001–2002) ===
No. overall	No. in season	Title	Directed by	Written by	Original release date	Prod. code	Viewers (millions)
77	1	"It's a Wonderful Life"	David Trainer	Linda Wallem	September 25, 2001	401	10.35
78	2	"Eric's Depression"	David Trainer	Bryan Moore & Chris Peterson	September 26, 2001	402	8.23
79	3	"Pinciotti vs. Forman"	David Trainer	Kristin Newman	October 2, 2001	403	9.71
80	4	"Hyde Gets the Girl"	David Trainer	Story by : Jill Effron; Teleplay by : Sarah McLaughlin & Alan Dybner	October 9, 2001	404	9.36
81	5	"Bye-Bye Basement"	David Trainer	Mark Hudis	October 16, 2001	406	10.27
82	6	"The Relapse"	David Trainer	Jeff Filgo & Jackie Filgo	November 6, 2001	405	12.43
83	7	"Uncomfortable Ball Stuff"	David Trainer	Dave Schiff	November 13, 2001	407	9.55
84	8	"Donna's Story"	David Trainer	Philip Stark	November 20, 2001	409	8.79
85	9	"The Forgotten Son"	David Trainer	Kristin Newman	November 21, 2001	408	7.51
86	10	"Red and Stacey"	David Trainer	Gregg Mettler	November 27, 2001	410	9.07
87	11	"The Third Wheel"	David Trainer	Bryan Moore & Chris Peterson	December 11, 2001	412	9.16
88	12	"An Eric Forman Christmas"	David Trainer	Dean Batali & Rob des Hotel	December 18, 2001	413	9.83
89	13	"Jackie Says Cheese"	David Trainer	Mark Hudis	January 8, 2002	414	10.08
90	14	"Eric's Hot Cousin"	David Trainer	Will Forte	January 22, 2002	411	10.77
91	15	"Tornado Prom"	David Trainer	Dave Schiff	February 5, 2002	415	10.24
92	16	"Donna Dates a Kelso"	David Trainer	Dean Batali & Rob des Hotel	February 5, 2002	417	10.84
93	17	"Kelso's Career"	David Trainer	Gregg Mettler	February 12, 2002	418	7.37
94	18	"Leo Loves Kitty"	David Trainer	Will Forte	February 19, 2002	419	9.08
95	19	"Jackie's Cheese Squeeze"	David Trainer	Chris Peterson & Bryan Moore	February 26, 2002	420	9.94
96	20	"Class Picture"	David Trainer	Kristin Newman	March 19, 2002	416	9.87
97	21	"Prank Day"	David Trainer	Alan Dybner	March 26, 2002	421	9.90
98	22	"Eric's Corvette Caper"	David Trainer	Philip Stark	April 9, 2002	422	8.69
99	23	"Hyde's Birthday"	David Trainer	Mark Hudis	April 23, 2002	423	7.42
100	24	"That '70s Musical"	David Trainer	Rob des Hotel & Dean Batali	April 30, 2002	425	7.76
101	25	"Eric's False Alarm"	David Trainer	Dave Schiff	May 7, 2002	424	7.68
102	26	"Everybody Loves Casey"	David Trainer	Gregg Mettler	May 14, 2002	426	7.04
103	27	"Love, Wisconsin Style"	David Trainer	Jeff Filgo & Jackie Filgo	May 21, 2002	427	9.17

=== Season 5 (2002–2003) ===
No. overall	No. in season	Title	Directed by	Written by	Original release date	Prod. code	Viewers (millions)
104	1	"Going to California"	David Trainer	Jeff Filgo & Jackie Filgo	September 17, 2002	501	10.01
105	2	"I Can't Quit You, Baby"	David Trainer	Gregg Mettler	September 24, 2002	502	8.92
106	3	"What is and What Should Never Be"	David Trainer	Will Forte	October 29, 2002	503	10.28
107	4	"Heartbreaker"	David Trainer	Kristin Newman	October 29, 2002	504	12.07
108	5	"Ramble On"	David Trainer	Philip Stark	November 12, 2002	505	8.38
109	6	"Over the Hills and Far Away"	David Trainer	Bryan Moore & Chris Peterson	November 19, 2002	506	8.74
110	7	"Hot Dog"	David Trainer	Rob des Hotel	November 26, 2002	507	8.48
111	8	"Thank You"	David Trainer	Dean Batali	December 3, 2002	508	10.17
112	9	"Black Dog"	David Trainer	Mark Hudis	December 10, 2002	509	8.98
113	10	"The Crunge"	David Trainer	Dave Schiff	December 17, 2002	510	8.84
114	11	"The Girl I Love" (Note: This episode's name is a shortening of the Led Zeppelin song "The Girl I Love She Got Long Black Wavy Hair".)	David Trainer	Gregg Mettler	January 7, 2003	511	8.86
115	12	"Misty Mountain Hop"	David Trainer	Dave Schiff	January 22, 2003	516	11.97
116	13	"Your Time Is Gonna Come"	David Trainer	Story by : Will Forte; Teleplay by : Jackie Filgo & Jeff Filgo	January 29, 2003	514	13.21
117	14	"Babe I'm Gonna Leave You"	David Trainer	Kristin Newman	February 5, 2003	515	12.21
118	15	"When the Levee Breaks"	David Trainer	Dean Batali	February 12, 2003	512	11.97
119	16	"Whole Lotta Love"	David Trainer	Philip Stark	February 19, 2003	513	12.81
120	17	"The Battle of Evermore"	David Trainer	Rob des Hotel	February 26, 2003	517	11.05
121	18	"Hey, Hey, What Can I Do?"	David Trainer	Mark Hudis	March 12, 2003	518	11.66
122	19	"Bring It On Home"	David Trainer	Chris Peterson & Bryan Moore	March 26, 2003	519	9.40
123	20	"No Quarter"	David Trainer	Dean Batali	April 2, 2003	520	11.06
124	21	"Trampled Under Foot"	David Trainer	Philip Stark	April 9, 2003	521	11.18
125	22	"You Shook Me"	David Trainer	Kristin Newman	April 16, 2003	522	10.44
126	23	"Nobody's Fault But Mine"	David Trainer	Mark Hudis	April 23, 2003	523	11.20
127	24	"Immigrant Song"	David Trainer	Rob des Hotel	May 7, 2003	524	11.72
128	25	"Celebration Day"	David Trainer	Gregg Mettler	May 14, 2003	525	13.57

=== Season 6 (2003–2004) ===
No. overall	No. in season	Title	Directed by	Written by	Original release date	Prod. code	Viewers (millions)
129	1	"The Kids Are Alright"	David Trainer	Jeff Filgo & Jackie Filgo	October 29, 2003	601	9.93
130	2	"Join Together"	David Trainer	Dean Batali	November 5, 2003	602	7.69
131	3	"The Magic Bus"	David Trainer	Rob Deshotel	November 12, 2003	603	8.31
132	4	"The Acid Queen"	David Trainer	Mark Hudis	November 19, 2003	604	8.47
133	5	"I'm Free"	David Trainer	Gregg Mettler	November 26, 2003	605	6.78
134	6	"We're Not Gonna Take It"	David Trainer	Dave Schiff	December 3, 2003	606	10.19
135	7	"Christmas"	David Trainer	Philip Stark	December 17, 2003	607	8.75
136	8	"I'm a Boy"	David Trainer	Kristin Newman	January 7, 2004	608	8.05
137	9	"Young Man Blues"	David Trainer	Bryan Moore & Chris Peterson	January 14, 2004	609	8.99
138	10	"A Legal Matter"	David Trainer	Alan Dybner	February 4, 2004	610	12.67
139	11	"I Can See for Miles"	David Trainer	Sarah McLaughlin	February 11, 2004	611	12.30
140	12	"Sally Simpson"	David Trainer	Dean Batali	February 18, 2004	612	12.23
141	13	"Won't Get Fooled Again"	David Trainer	Rob Deshotel	February 25, 2004	613	11.78
142	14	"Baby Don't You Do It"	David Trainer	Mark Hudis	March 3, 2004	614	9.69
143	15	"Who are You?"	David Trainer	Gregg Mettler	March 10, 2004	615	10.88
144	16	"Man with Money"	David Trainer	Bryan Moore & Chris Peterson	March 17, 2004	616	10.15
145	17	"Happy Jack"	David Trainer	Kristin Newman	March 24, 2004	617	11.65
146	18	"Do You Think It's Alright?"	David Trainer	Patrick Kienlen	March 31, 2004	618	11.21
147	19	"Substitute"	David Trainer	Jennifer Keene	April 21, 2004	619	9.94
148	20	"Squeeze Box"	David Trainer	Philip Stark	April 28, 2004	620	9.73
149	21	"5:15"	David Trainer	Gregg Mettler	May 5, 2004	621	9.04
150	22	"Sparks"	David Trainer	Rob Deshotel	May 12, 2004	623	11.53
151	23	"My Wife"	David Trainer	Dean Batali	May 16, 2004	622	7.70
152	24	"Going Mobile"	David Trainer	Mark Hudis	May 19, 2004	624	10.15
153	25	"The Seeker"	David Trainer	Jeff Filgo & Jackie Filgo	May 19, 2004	625	13.47

=== Season 7 (2004–2005) ===
No. overall	No. in season	Title	Directed by	Written by	Original release date	Prod. code	Viewers (millions)
154	1	"Time Is on My Side"	David Trainer	Jeff Filgo & Jackie Filgo	September 8, 2004	701	7.85
155	2	"Let's Spend the Night Together"	David Trainer	Dean Batali	September 15, 2004	702	6.61
156	3	"(I Can't Get No) Satisfaction"	David Trainer	Kristin Newman	September 22, 2004	703	5.64
157	4	"Beast of Burden"	David Trainer	Dave Schiff	September 29, 2004	704	6.43
158	5	"It's Only Rock and Roll"	David Trainer	Philip Stark	October 6, 2004	705	6.27
159	6	"Rip This Joint"	David Trainer	Rob Des Hotel	November 3, 2004	706	6.25
160	7	"Mother's Little Helper"	David Trainer	Mark Hudis	November 10, 2004	710	7.00
161	8	"Angie"	David Trainer	Chris Peterson & Bryan Moore	November 17, 2004	707	6.66
162	9	"You Can't Always Get What You Want"	David Trainer	Gregg Mettler	November 24, 2004	708	6.45
163	10	"Surprise, Surprise"	David Trainer	Sarah McLaughlin	December 1, 2004	709	6.15
164	11	"Winter"	David Trainer	Dean Batali	December 15, 2004	711	6.17
165	12	"Don't Lie to Me"	David Trainer	Kristin Newman	January 5, 2005	712	6.24
166	13	"Can't You Hear Me Knocking"	David Trainer	Rob Des Hotel	January 12, 2005	713	6.27
167	14	"Street Fighting Man"	David Trainer	Alan Dybner	February 9, 2005	714	8.87
168	15	"It's All Over Now"	David Trainer	Mark Hudis	February 16, 2005	715	8.58
169	16	"On with the Show"	David Trainer	Dave Schiff	February 23, 2005	716	8.27
170	17	"Down the Road Apiece"	David Trainer	Philip Stark	March 2, 2005	717	7.54
171	18	"Oh, Baby (We Got a Good Thing Goin')"	David Trainer	Gregg Mettler	March 16, 2005	718	7.47
172	19	"Who's Been Sleeping Here?"	David Trainer	David Spancer	March 23, 2005	719	8.26
173	20	"Gimme Shelter"	David Trainer	Chris Peterson & Bryan Moore	March 30, 2005	720	7.25
174	21	"2120 So. Michigan Ave"	David Trainer	Dean Batali	April 27, 2005	721	7.09
175	22	"2000 Light Years from Home"	David Trainer	Kristin Newman	May 4, 2005	722	6.61
176	23	"Take It or Leave It"	David Trainer	Gregg Mettler	May 11, 2005	723	6.33
177	24	"Short and Curlies"	David Trainer	Rob Des Hotel	May 18, 2005	724	8.77
178	25	"Till the Next Goodbye" (Note: This is the last episode to feature Topher Grace and Ashton Kutcher as main cast members. Kutcher guest stars in five episodes of Season 8, which includes the finale, while Grace briefly appears in the last episode, but remains uncredited.)	David Trainer	Mark Hudis	May 18, 2005	725	8.77

=== Season 8 (2005–2006) ===
No. overall	No. in season	Title	Directed by	Written by	Original release date	Prod. code	Viewers (millions)
179	1	"Bohemian Rhapsody"	David Trainer	Gregg Mettler	November 2, 2005	801	7.85
180	2	"Somebody to Love"	David Trainer	Rob Deshotel	November 2, 2005	802	7.85
181	3	"You're My Best Friend"	David Trainer	Chris Peterson & Bryan Moore	November 9, 2005	804	6.98
182	4	"Misfire"	David Trainer	Kristin Newman	November 16, 2005	805	6.78
183	5	"Stone Cold Crazy"	David Trainer	Dave Schiff	November 30, 2005	803	6.58
184	6	"Long Away"	David Trainer	Philip Stark	December 7, 2005	806	6.82
185	7	"Fun It"	David Trainer	David Spancer	December 14, 2005	807	6.13
186	8	"Good Company"	David Trainer	Dean Batali	January 12, 2006	808	5.07
187	9	"Who Needs You"	David Trainer	Sarah McLaughlin	January 19, 2006	811	5.23
188	10	"Sweet Lady"	David Trainer	Alan Dybner	January 26, 2006	809	5.68
189	11	"Good Old Fashioned Lover Boy"	David Trainer	Greg Schaffer & Steve Joe	February 2, 2006	810	5.76
190	12	"Killer Queen"	David Trainer	Mark Hudis	February 9, 2006	812	4.68
191	13	"Spread Your Wings"	David Trainer	Gregg Mettler	March 16, 2006	813	5.63
192	14	"Son and Daughter"	David Trainer	Ken Blankstein	March 23, 2006	817	5.49
193	15	"Keep Yourself Alive"	David Trainer	Dave Schiff	April 13, 2006	814	3.72
194	16	"My Fairy King"	David Trainer	Philip Stark	April 27, 2006	815	4.47
195	17	"Crazy Little Thing Called Love"	David Trainer	Kristin Newman	April 27, 2006	816	5.50
196	18	"We Will Rock You"	David Trainer	Chris Peterson & Bryan Moore	May 4, 2006	818	4.64
197	19	"Sheer Heart Attack"	David Trainer	Steve Joe & Greg Schaffer	May 4, 2006	820	5.69
198	20	"Leaving Home Ain't Easy"	David Trainer	Chris Peterson & Bryan Moore & Kristin Newman	May 11, 2006	819	6.18
199	21	"Love of My Life"	David Trainer	Philip Stark & Dave Schiff	May 18, 2006	821	8.58
200	22	"That '70s Finale"	David Trainer	Gregg Mettler	May 18, 2006	822	10.02

== Specials ==
Title	Original release date	Viewers (millions)
"That '70s Special"	April 30, 2002	7.87
The cast and crew discuss the show and its run ahead of the series' 100th episode.
"That '70s KISS Show"	August 30, 2002	6.84
The cast tries to sneak past security guards in order to get behind-the-scenes of a Kiss concert.
"That '70s Bloopers"	May 12, 2004	7.70
A blooper reel from episodes of the show.
"That '70s Show: The Final Goodbye"	May 11, 2006	7.80
The cast and crew showcase highlights from the show, as they prepare for the series finale.

== Ratings ==
That '70s Show : U.S. viewers per episode (millions)

Season	Episode number																										
Season	1	2	3	4	5	6	7	8	9	10	11	12	13	14	15	16	17	18	19	20	21	22	23	24	25	26	27
1	12.56	11.12	7.03	10.84	10.28	10.19	12.83	11.73	11.50	11.25	11.39	12.29	13.20	10.82	13.25	11.37	14.09	11.73	12.30	11.75	6.78	6.28	7.35	7.04	7.58	–	
2	11.25	8.82	10.46	8.77	8.95	9.08	7.83	9.58	8.43	8.48	8.43	9.01	9.37	8.72	8.94	9.30	10.00	9.44	9.03	11.91	11.78	8.75	8.56	9.56	8.40	8.09	–
3	11.92	11.80	10.41	8.80	9.97	11.10	11.59	11.62	11.92	13.16	11.67	12.59	12.93	11.89	12.42	12.15	10.08	10.75	11.21	10.11	9.54	11.02	8.97	10.22	10.56	–	
4	10.35	8.23	9.71	9.36	10.27	12.43	9.55	8.79	7.51	9.07	9.16	9.83	10.08	10.77	10.24	10.84	7.37	9.08	9.94	9.87	9.90	8.69	7.42	7.76	7.68	7.04	9.17
5	10.01	8.92	10.28	12.07	8.38	8.74	8.48	10.17	8.98	8.84	8.86	11.97	13.21	12.21	11.97	12.81	11.05	11.66	9.40	11.06	11.18	10.44	11.20	11.72	13.57	–	
6	9.93	7.69	8.31	8.47	6.78	10.19	8.75	8.05	8.99	12.67	12.30	12.23	11.78	9.69	10.88	10.15	11.65	11.21	9.94	9.73	9.04	11.53	7.70	10.15	13.47	–	
7	7.85	6.61	5.64	6.43	6.27	6.25	7.00	6.66	6.45	6.15	6.17	6.24	6.27	8.87	8.58	8.27	7.54	7.47	8.26	7.25	7.09	6.61	6.33	8.77	8.77	–	
8	7.85	7.85	6.98	6.78	6.58	6.82	6.13	5.07	5.23	5.68	5.76	4.68	5.63	5.49	3.72	4.47	5.50	4.64	5.69	6.18	8.58	10.02	–				

Audience measurement performed by Nielsen Media Research
