= List of Man with a Plan episodes =

Man with a Plan, is an American sitcom television series created by Jackie and Jeff Filgo and starring Matt LeBlanc. The series premiered on October 24, 2016, on CBS.

On May 10, 2019, the series was renewed for a fourth season, which premiered on April 2, 2020. In May 2020, the series was canceled after four seasons. During the course of the series, 69 episodes of Man with a Plan aired, between October 24, 2016, and June 11, 2020.

== Series overview ==
Season	Episodes	Originally released	
Season	Episodes	First released	Last released
1	22	October 24, 2016	May 15, 2017
2	21	November 13, 2017	May 21, 2018
3	13	February 4, 2019	May 6, 2019
4	13	April 2, 2020	June 11, 2020

== Episodes ==
=== Season 1 (2016–17) ===
No. overall	No. in season	Title	Directed by	Written by	Original release date	U.S. viewers (millions)
1	1	"Pilot"	James Burrows	Jeff Filgo & Jackie Filgo	October 24, 2016	7.42
When her youngest child Emme starts kindergarten, Andi Burns goes back to work, forcing Adam, her contractor husband, to spend more time at home taking care of their three kids. Adam is clearly out of his element, while the kids want their mom back after spending only one day with their father.
2	2	"Two Tickets to Paradise"	James Burrows	Jeff Filgo & Jackie Filgo	October 31, 2016	5.95
When a vendor gives Adam two tickets to a Pittsburgh Steelers game, he offers to take his brother and business partner Don as a thank-you for Don covering him at work while he tends to the kids. Andi later sees the tickets and assumes Adam is taking her to celebrate the anniversary of their first date, which was also at a Steelers game, causing Adam to have to decide whom to disappoint.
3	3	"The Puppet Theater"	James Burrows	Alex Herschlag	November 7, 2016	6.26
When Mrs. Rodriguez accuses Adam of slacking in his role as Room Parent because he doesn't have time to make puppets for Teacher Appreciation Day, Adam threatens to transfer Emme into the other kindergarten class. This doesn't sit well with Andi, who considers Mrs. Rodriguez a superior teacher and says she had to do a lot of "butt kissing" to get Emme into her class.
4	4	"Un-Dressed"	Pamela Fryman	Jordan Reddout & Gus Hickey	November 14, 2016	6.18
After repeatedly being forced out of the house by Andi and the kids, Adam and Don want to turn the garage into a "man cave", but there's a problem – boxes and boxes of junk that Andi refuses to get rid of because they represent family memories.
5	5	"Thanksgiving"	James Burrows	Mark Gross	November 21, 2016	5.98
Adam brings Emme's lunch to school and catches Andi secretly meeting with Mrs. Rodriguez about an upcoming Thanksgiving meal for 30 at the school. Andi tells Adam she didn't think he could handle this task, which hurts Adam enough that he wants to prove her wrong.
6	6	"Holey War"	James Burrows	Tommy Johnagin	December 5, 2016	6.18
When the kids put a hole in the wall with their rowdy play, Adam's and Andi's different approaches to parenting are put to the test. Each tries to get the kids to turn on each other and identify the culprit, but the resolve of their children is surprisingly strong.
7	7	"Winter Has Come"	James Burrows	Farhan Arshad	December 12, 2016	6.62
To get out of his usual Christmas chores, Adam convinces Andi's parents to host a family Christmas at their home in Virginia Beach. He orders all of the kids' gifts online and has them delivered to Virginia Beach, but his plan backfires when they get snowed in on the day of their trip. Forced to improvise, Adam has to pull off a "Christmas miracle" to avoid disappointing the kids and angering Andi.
8	8	"Adam Steps Up"	Pamela Fryman	Gregg Mettler	December 19, 2016	6.17
Andi tries to take Emme and Teddy to the zoo, but gets stuck in traffic for hours. This causes Adam to have to deal with Kate having her first period without Andi's help.
9	9	"What About Bob?"	Pamela Fryman	Tommy Johnagin	January 2, 2017	6.55
After Andi confesses that one of her new work friends is a man named Bob (Gary Anthony Williams), she is surprised and a little hurt when Adam doesn't exhibit his usual jealousy. She then tells fake stories to enhance Bob's charm and talents, not knowing that Adam was jealous all along and was just trying to hide it.
10	10	"A Dinner Gone Wrong"	Pamela Fryman	Mark Gross	January 16, 2017	7.70
The Burns' plans for a couples trip to Las Vegas with Don and Marcy are put in jeopardy when Andi realizes that Marcy is the girl who teased her and gave her an unflattering nickname back in high school. Meanwhile, Teddy stops hanging out with the few friends he has in school to spend all of his free time with his online gaming buddies, making his parents concerned.
11	11	"The Talk"	Pamela Fryman	Alex Herschlag	January 23, 2017	7.69
When Andi and Adam find a topless woman's photo on Teddy's tablet, Andi makes Adam have "the talk" with his son, saying she took care of it with Kate. After an uncomfortable talk that shocks Teddy, Adam learns that the newly body-conscious Kate was the one looking at the topless photo out of curiosity, and that Kate learned about sex from a school health class, not from Andi.
12	12	"The Three Amigos"	Phill Lewis	Jordan Reddout & Gus Hickey	February 6, 2017	7.25
Adam is less than thrilled when Andi invites Lowell over to watch the hockey game with him and Don, but Adam's attitude changes when he learns Lowell can make a killer multimedia presentation for a construction client the Burns Brothers are trying to woo. Don takes this as a slap in the face, given that he's always handled sales his own way. Elsewhere, Mrs. Rodriguez confesses to Andi that she had an erotic dream about Adam.
13	13	"Valentine's Day"	James Burrows	Gregg Mettler	February 13, 2017	7.20
Adam has every detail for a fancy Valentine's Day dinner with Andi planned out, except finding a babysitter. After striking out with Marie and Lowell, Kate reminds her dad that she's 13 and can babysit. This pleases Adam, but Andi isn't so sure that Kate is ready. After Andi reluctantly agrees, she and Adam go to the restaurant and find that Don has stolen Adam's reservation.
14	14	"Kate's First Date"	Pamela Fryman	Farhan Arshad	February 20, 2017	6.75
Kate is excited about going on her first date with a classmate named Royce, something that Andi approved without consulting Adam. After Adam checks Royce's Instagram page and sees that he may be a bit of a "player", he tries to scare the boy away. Meanwhile, Don can't think of a good gift for Marcy's birthday, so he seeks help from Lowell.
15	15	"Assisted Living"	Pamela Fryman	Jeff Filgo & Jackie Filgo	February 27, 2017	6.61
Adam's parents, Joe (Stacy Keach) and Bev (Swoosie Kurtz), stop by in their motor home for a visit. After Joe learns that Adam is now taking care of the kids, he and Bev propose they stay to help, and they begin to live in the Burns' driveway.
16	16	"The A Team"	Pamela Fryman	Alex Herschlag	March 13, 2017	6.34
Andi and Adam have Lowell and his wife Jen over for dinner, fully expecting Jen to be as lame as Lowell is, but Jen (Jenna Dewan Tatum) turns out to be pretty and interesting. Later, after Jen and Lowell appear to make up an excuse to leave, Andi and Adam start to think it is themselves who have become the lame couple.
17	17	"Doctor No"	Pamela Fryman	Gregg Mettler	March 20, 2017	5.32
When Adam discovers that Joe hasn't been to the doctor in almost ten years, he urges his father to make an appointment. Andi soon also discovers that the doctor Adam says he's been going to annually retired five years ago. Joe, Adam and Don all get checkups with a new doctor, and the result is that Joe needs a colonoscopy. Meanwhile, Bev takes advantage of Lowell's kind nature by asking him to drive her everywhere.
18	18	"The Blame Game"	James Burrows	Tommy Johnagin	April 10, 2017	5.33
Adam and Don learn their wives don't get as mad at their screw-ups if they simply blame them on each other. Things take a turn for the worse for Adam when Andi finds out their scheme, especially because it dredges up baggage from their past.
19	19	"Spring Fling"	Pamela Fryman	Story by : Mark Gross	April 17, 2017	5.42
A problem arises when Lisa (Christine Woods), the mall construction client, tells Adam that Don isn't professional enough to attend an upcoming meeting with HR and executives, causing Adam to try to find a way to let his brother down easy. With Adam busy, Andi offers to take some time off and be room parent for a while, mainly because she wants to schmooze Mrs. Rodriguez into recommending Emme for the "good" first grade class. Andi regrets this when Mrs. Rodriguez asks her to organize the entire Spring Fling for the kindergarteners.
20	20	"Dirty Money"	James Burrows	Story by : Farhan Arshad; Teleplay by : Jordan Reddout & Gus Hickey	May 1, 2017	5.36
Adam and Andi regret accepting a loan from Joe after he uses it as an excuse to insert himself into their lives. Bev and Marcy battle over who should host Don's birthday party. Meanwhile, Don panics when he learns from Lowell that Marcy donated his old laptop to the library.
21	21	"Operation False Freedom"	Gail Mancuso	Story by : Jeff Filgo & Jackie Filgo	May 8, 2017	5.16
Convinced that Kate lied to them about going to the library, but unable to prove it, Adam and Andi activate the GPS tracker on her phone. Kate discovers their ploy and throws them off her trail by planting the phone in Don's pocket. Andi and Adam find Kate innocently hanging out with friends at a coffee shop. While still mad that she deceived them, the two agree that Kate should have more freedom now that she's turned 14.
22	22	"Buzzer Beater"	Gail Mancuso	Story by : Gregg Mettler	May 15, 2017	5.73
Upon seeing Don and Marcy with their new granddaughter, Andi gets the itch to have another child. Adam insists they are too old, but after Emme refuses to kiss him when he drops her off at kindergarten, he also gets on board. When they later see Don and Marcy completely frazzled from spending a couple days with an infant, Adam and Andi regret their decision and have to sweat out the results of a pregnancy test.

=== Season 2 (2017–18) ===
No. overall	No. in season	Title	Directed by	Written by	Original release date	U.S. viewers (millions)
23	1	"The Silver Fox"	Andy Cadiff	Mark Gross	November 13, 2017	5.38
To give Kate a break from babysitting, Andi hires a young volunteer from her hospital named Sophia (Victoria Justice) to watch the kids. While Adam worries that Sophia will become attracted to a "silver fox" like himself, Andi is more jealous that Kate goes to Sophia for advice. Sophia later tells Adam she has the hots for him, but when he tells Andi, she doesn't believe him.
24	2	"Andi's Boyfriend"	Andy Cadiff	Tommy Johnagin	November 20, 2017	5.44
Adam gets a visit from Pastor Carl (Jonathan Adams), who is making amends for a past gambling addiction. Pastor Carl says he gambled away money that he was supposed to use to renew his license to wed people, meaning Adam and Andi are not legally married. Making matters worse, Pastor Carl was not Andi's first choice, but the frugal Adam hired him because he was cheaper. Adam tries to set up a renewal of vows with a licensed official, without telling Andi about Carl.
25	3	"The Parents Strike Back"	Andy Cadiff	Rob Des Hotel	November 27, 2017	5.70
Frustrated by the messes in their kids' bedrooms, Adam and Andi decide to withhold allowances until the rooms are cleaner. Kate convinces her younger siblings they can break their parents by just letting the filth build up even more, so the kids tell mom and dad they are on strike. Taking a tip from Joe, Adam and Andi decide to retaliate by making things as miserable as possible for their children.
26	4	"Into the Weeds"	Gail Mancuso	Jeff Filgo & Jackie Filgo	December 4, 2017	6.42
When Adam finds out that a boy Kate is dating was caught by his mother possessing marijuana, he wants to be strict with Kate while Andi opts for a more relaxed approach. Adam learns that Joe, who was always strict with him and Don about drugs, has a pot prescription for his arthritis. Things get interesting when Adam unknowingly eats some of Joe's "special" gummy candy.
27	5	"Battle of the Sexists"	Andy Cadiff	Ethan Sandler & Adrian Wenner	December 11, 2017	5.70
Andi accuses Adam and Don of being sexist when they only interview male candidates for a shop foreman position on the mall project. Adam soon hires a female named Zara (Lilah Richcreek), partly to please Andi but also because she is the most qualified for the job. Andi regrets her accusation against Adam when Don recognizes the pretty new shop foreman as a former dancer at a strip club. Meanwhile, Adam and Andi fight the school to allow Kate to play on the boys soccer team.
28	6	"Adam Gets Neighborly"	Victor Gonzalez	Tommy Johnagin & Farhan Arshad	December 18, 2017	5.61
After Adam has alienated most of the neighbors, Andi suggests they start fresh with new neighbors Joy (Sherri Shepherd) and Rudy (Tim Meadows), who have just moved in. But there's a problem: Adam has already gotten on the bad side of Joy, a building inspector, when she visited his job site.
29	7	"We Can Be Heroes"	Victor Gonzalez	Gregg Mettler	January 15, 2018	6.68
Adam and Andi experience money problems with Teddy needing glasses and Kate needing braces. The two make a budget and decide to give up some luxuries, mainly Adam's cable sports subscription, which has Don, Joe and Lowell upset because they are always at the house watching games. Adam later forces Andi to give up her expensive hairdresser, after Joe discovers she had it listed as a necessity, not a luxury.
30	8	"Lice Lice Baby"	Gail Mancuso	Farhan Arshad	January 22, 2018	6.74
Adam worries about how Lisa, his boss at the mall job site, will react when he has to bring Teddy and Emme to work. He gets even more worried when the Burns kids are diagnosed with lice, and he later sees Lisa scratching her head at an awards banquet. Meanwhile, Andi realizes how distant she's become from her kids when she is the only family member to not catch lice from them.
31	9	"The Gunfight"	Andy Cardiff	Gregg Mettler	January 29, 2018	6.64
Joe and Beverly prepare to watch the kids for a few days so that Adam and Andi can take a much-needed trip to Las Vegas. Andi worries a bit when Joe says he plans to teach Teddy to shoot Adam's old BB gun, then wants to pull the plug on the vacation when she learns that Joe also has real guns in the house. Joe and Adam take Andi to a shooting range to show her that guns are okay in responsible hands, but then it's Adam who worries when he sees Joe mistake his gun for his cellphone. Elsewhere, Don brings the BB gun to Lowell's house to help eradicate the woodchuck that is eating Lowell's tomatoes, but he ends up shooting Lowell.
32	10	"Adam's Turtle-y Awesome Valentine's Day"	Gail Mancuso	Jessica Runck	February 5, 2018	6.46
When Andi convinces Adam that she does not want to exchange gifts for Valentine’s Day, Adam takes the gold necklace with pictures of their three children that he'd already bought for Andi and gives it to Beverly. Unknown to Adam, Andi had just discovered the hidden necklace moments before Adam’s decision, and she is now looking forward to receiving it. Beverly is so giddy about the necklace that Adam is stuck with a difficult decision.
33	11	"Guess Who's Coming to Breakfast, Lunch and Dinner"	Victor Gonzalez	Ethan Sandler & Adrian Wenner	February 26, 2018	5.92
When Adam gets tired of constantly having to accompany Beverly at bingo, he suggests to Andi that she get his mom a job as a hospital volunteer. Beverly loves the job, only to make Joe feel lonely. To compensate for his loneliness, Joe starts spending his time with Adam and Andi and expects them to wait on him like Beverly used to do.
34	12	"Everybody's a Winner"	Joanna Kerns	Mark Gross	March 5, 2018	5.90
When a senior asks Kate to the spring dance at school, Adam is staunchly against it while Andi says Kate is mature enough to let her go. While discussing the issue with Joe, Lowell and Don, Adam learns Joe's "silent negotiation" technique. Adam tries it on Andi and, sure enough, she talks herself into realizing it's a bad idea to let Kate go on the date. But neighbor Joy soon tips off Andi to what Adam did, because her husband uses it on her, and she gives Andi a way to fight back.
35	13	"The Party Planner"	Ben Weiss	Rob DesHotel	March 12, 2018	6.35
Following several years of failed, uninspired gifts for Andi's birthday, Adam decides to throw her a party with their family members, as well as Lowell and his wife Jen. When Don and Marcy pass on the party because of Marcy's previous engagement, Adam replaces them with Joy and Rudy, despite Andi's protest that they should reschedule. While Adam insists that he can handle planning the party, Don and Marcy meet Joy and Rudy at a grocery store, throwing a wrench into Adam's scheme.
36	14	"March Madness"	Victor Gonzalez	Tommy Johnagin	March 19, 2018	5.45
When their schedules don't line up and they realize the kids will be alone for two hours after school, Adam and Andi hire Rudy to install security cameras inside and outside the house. Adam and Andi inadvertently make a sex tape, which inspires them to make another. The two then go on a wild chase for the tablet that has the footage when Beverly borrows it because hers broke down, then gives it to Don to give back to Adam. The tablet is subsequently picked up by Lowell, who mistook it for his own when he was at Don's house.
37	15	"Out with the In-Laws"	Victor Gonzalez	Jackie Filgo & Jeff Filgo	March 26, 2018	5.44
Adam and Andi think they can finally be happily alone for a holiday when their feuding parents each back out of coming to the house on Easter Sunday because the other set of parents will be there. But the plans are threatened when Joe and Bev scheme to take the kids to Disney World for the holiday, while Andi's parents (Dan Lauria and Nancy Lenehan) arrive a day early to claim "Easter Eve" for themselves.
38	16	"April Fools"	Pamela Fryman	Ethan Sandler & Adrian Wenner	April 9, 2018	5.48
While Adam, the kids, Don and Joe all enjoy pulling April Fool's pranks, Andi reminds Adam that she hates pranks due to a traumatic experience with one when she was seven years old. Adam is sure that an unscary, funny prank will change Andi's mind, but his attempts fail. Adam would have done better to be on his guard, because Andi has a surprise up her sleeve.
39	17	"King for a Day"	Victor Gonzalez	Jessica Runck	April 16, 2018	5.06
After Andi discourages Adam from giving Emme a princess gown because it reinforces undesired female stereotypes, she mentions a lie she told Kate years ago for the same reason. Andi then defends her practice of protecting her children through little white lies, which she calls "love bubbles". Adam seems to accept her explanation, until he realizes that Andi does the same to him, particularly with regard to a recliner he wanted to buy that she said was unsafe.
40	18	"The Burns System"	Victor Gonzalez	Farhan Arshad	April 30, 2018	4.79
Adam is excited when Joe needs a new car and takes him along to learn the "Burns System" at the dealership, given that Joe has always had Don accompany him before. But when they get there, Adam is upset to learn that Joe asked Don to arrive at the last minute and be the "closer". Elsewhere, Andi and Marcy try to get rid of a pet snake that Emme brought home.
41	19	"We Hate Money"	Victor Gonzalez	Rob Des Hotel	May 7, 2018	4.91
Mall client Lisa tells Adam and Don that she has to go away to work on herself, and that her replacement wants a different contractor to take over for Burns Brothers. With no other prospects, Adam and Don decide they need to make a commercial, with Lowell's help. When the filming starts, Don is fine but Adam freezes on camera, leading to his part having to be played by local actor Leif Forrest (Geoff Stults). Meanwhile, as the only current breadwinner, Andi is determined to ask for a raise at her job, only to learn that her department is being gutted and she will be laid off.
42	20	"We Got a Girl"	Pamela Fryman	Mark Gross	May 14, 2018	5.46
After Adam and Andi determine that Lisa's issues stem from her being lonely, they enlist help from Don, Marcy and Lowell to find a man for her in hopes of getting Adam back to work. They ultimately decide to set up Lisa with Leif Forrest, who helped on the Burns Brothers commercial, only to later learn that Leif is Lisa's ex-husband.
43	21	"Family Business"	Victor Gonzalez	Gregg Mettler	May 21, 2018	5.69
When Andi successfully helps Bev and Joe design their kitchen remodel and Adam builds it, Andi and Adam begin to think they might have a future working together professionally rebuilding and selling old houses.

=== Season 3 (2019) ===
No. overall	No. in season	Title	Directed by	Written by	Original release date	U.S. viewers (millions)
44	1	"Wife-Proof"	Terry Hughes	Jeff Filgo & Jackie Filgo	February 4, 2019	6.17
In preparation for Andi coming to work at Burns Brothers as their interior designer, Adam gets the guys to "wife-proof" the office, but Andi quickly figures out his scheme. Andi soon discovers evidence that Lowell has leased an apartment, and Lowell later confirms that he and Jen are separated. Concerned about his friend, Adam invites Lowell to move in with him and his family.
45	2	"Yeah, Maybe"	Terry Hughes	Gregg Mettler	February 11, 2019	5.63
Adam uses Don's "yeah, maybe" technique when trying to deny Andi the expensive backsplash tile she wants for their flip project, but Andi stands her ground. Meanwhile, Lowell decides he'd rather move back to his apartment than live with the goings-on in the Burns household.
46	3	"Put Him on the Ground"	Terry Hughes	Tommy Johnagin	February 18, 2019	5.26
When Emme is bullied by an older boy, Adam encourages Teddy to protect his sister by pushing the boy off a swing. This has unintended consequences when Andi finds out, and Teddy also gets in trouble at school. Elsewhere, the Burns brothers and Lowell try to convince a reluctant Joe to agree to having a home care nurse following his knee replacement surgery.
47	4	"Adam's Wall Hole Bowl"	Terry Hughes	Farhan Arshad	February 25, 2019	5.94
Adam and Don spend an evening at a downtrodden Lowell's apartment to keep him company, and wind up inventing a game throwing a paper ball through a hole in Lowell's wall. Soon they are making up excuses every night to spend time playing the game, lying to their wives about supporting their lonely friend. Also, Andi seeks some desk space in the guys' cramped construction office.
48	5	"The New Old School"	James Widdoes	Gregg Mettler	March 4, 2019	4.93
When Kate is caught returning home late through her bedroom window, Adam blames Andi's "new school" parenting. But his attempts to go "old school" on Kate's punishment don't work out very well, either.
49	6	"Semi-Indecent Proposal"	Ben Weiss	Rob DesHotel	March 11, 2019	5.30
The Burns Brothers learn that a sewer piping problem at their flip home is going to cost them $20,000 to fix. After several failed attempts to secure a loan, Andi and Lowell think they have found a loan officer (Ian Gomez) willing to front them the money. Andi agrees to meet the guy for dinner to close the deal, but Lowell is unable to keep the secret from the jealous Adam. Elsewhere, the gang learns that Joe ambulates well after his knee replacement, but is lying about it because he likes having Nurse Funchy around as a friend.
50	7	"Hotel Hanky Panky"	Michael McDonald	Mark Gross	March 18, 2019	5.09
Teddy always wants to sleep with Adam and Andi after Adam let him watch a horror movie, causing the parents to book a hotel for some alone time. They send Teddy and Emme to stay with Don and Marcy, while letting Kate stay at home. Adam forbids Kate from having friends over because "friends invite more friends", but Andi secretly tells Kate it's okay. Sure enough, a full-blown party ensues at the Burns house. Meanwhile, Teddy's continued fears put Don's "streak" with Marcy in jeopardy, so he dumps off Teddy and Emme with Joe and Bev.
51	8	"Adam's Ribs"	Kari Lizer	Rob DesHotel	March 25, 2019	5.40
After fearing that he's losing touch with Kate, Adam tries to bond with his daughter by joining her efforts to become a vegan. He then convinces Andi to try it, too. But Adam's will is tested when he learns he won a free meal from his favorite barbeque restaurant.
52	9	"Adam Acts His Age"	Kevin S. Bright	Mark Gross	April 1, 2019	5.32
Adam plans to spend his 50th birthday with Don riding a dirt bike down "the devil's tailpipe" in Colorado, but it's put on hold when he injures his back blowing out his birthday candles. This forces Adam to retreat to the couch, where he starts turning into his dad. Though she initially disapproved, Andi promises to let Adam take his motorcycle trip if he will agree to do the physical therapy his doctor ordered.
53	10	"We Don't Need Another Hero"	Anthony Rich	Adrian Wenner & Ethan Sandler	April 15, 2019	5.06
Adam is proud when Teddy gets an 'A' on an essay he wrote for English class about his hero, but is soon disappointed when he learns the essay is about Andi. Adam then spends the next few days trying to prove to Teddy that he is the real hero.
54	11	"Cabin Fever"	Anthony Rich	Tommy Johnagin	April 22, 2019	5.03
Joe makes Adam the new "trip captain" for the annual guys trip to their cabin, which annoys Don. Adam's first order of business is to invite Lowell because of his cooking skills. This puts Adam's captain status in jeopardy when the wives determine that the trip must be something fun if Lowell is going.
55	12	"Clean Country Living"	Michael McDonald	Ethan Sandler & Adrian Wenner	April 29, 2019	5.32
When Andi's annoying and condescending sister Kelly (Jessica St. Clair) comes to visit, Adam and Andi try to figure out a way to put her in her place. They recruit Marcy, figuring she is the best at bringing people down, but before Marcy can do much, they learn Kelly lost her job and is depressed about being alone. Kelly bounces back quickly, however, as Adam and Andi soon catch her in bed with Lowell.
56	13	"The Intervention(s)"	Michael McDonald	Jessica Runck	May 6, 2019	4.87
The group holds an intervention for Lowell, trying to convince him that Kelly is bad for him. But Kelly crashes the event and surprisingly reveals a softer side. One by one, the group becomes convinced that Kelly is a changed woman, with Adam being the last holdout. He eventually has to resort to trickery to get Kelly to reveal her ulterior motives.

=== Season 4 (2020) ===
No. overall	No. in season	Title	Directed by	Written by	Original release date	U.S. viewers (millions)
57	1	"The V-Word"	Ben Weiss	Gregg Mettler	April 2, 2020	7.01
When Andi complains of persistent headaches, her doctor thinks it might be hormonal and suggests she stop taking birth control pills. As Adam's sex life with Andi declines, Lowell suggests that he get a vasectomy...in full earshot of Andi. Adam is horrified at the idea, and does all he can to avoid it. In the end, Andi learns her headaches are due to too much caffeine, and goes back on the pill.
58	2	"Adam's Big Little Lie"	Terry Hughes	Jamie Lissow	April 9, 2020	5.96
After having a conversation with Teddy about his lying, Andi tells Adam he sets a bad example with all his little white lies. Adam promises to stop, but soon Joe puts him in a bad position; he needs a pacemaker but doesn't want Bev to know, and he asks Adam to be with him in the hospital. Joe suggests they go to Marcy for a cover story to explain them being gone all night, saying the two have formed an alliance to keep the family in line. Sure enough, Adam and Joe are caught in the lie, and it turns out Bev knew all along. Meanwhile Kate successfully convinces her gullible little sister Emme she's adopted by teasing her while Teddy plays along which, makes her worried she's not a real member of the family.
59	3	"The Ex Files"	Terry Hughes	Steve Joe	April 9, 2020	5.60
Adam and Don see a text from Lowell's ex-wife Jen on the phone he left behind, asking him to meet her for a drink. Concerned about his heart being broken again, they try to hide it from him, but Lowell finds out and is excited about possibly getting back together with Jen. Don and Adam go to the hotel to inquire about Jen's true intentions, and learn that she's marrying someone else. Meanwhile, Adam asks Kate to check on Joe because he's not answering his phone. Kate walks in on Joe and Bev having sex, leaving her traumatized.
60	4	"Going All the Way"	Terry Hughes	Mark Gross	April 16, 2020	6.56
When Teddy says he wants to ask his study buddy Madison on a real date, Adam and Andi argue over which of them can give Teddy the best dating advice. Their advice only makes things weird, causing Madison's mother to confront them. Adam and Andi eventually agree that Kate would be the best person to smooth things over with Madison.
61	5	"Winner Winner Chicken Salad"	Terry Hughes	Jackie Filgo & Jeff Filgo	April 23, 2020	5.84
When neither Adam nor Andi wants to take Kate and her friends to the mall for prom dress shopping, they argue over traditional and modern parenting roles. Adam visits Don, who is stuck watching his grandson after Marcy contracted food poisoning. Adam finds evidence that Marcy has recovered, and worse, Andi is helping Marcy keep up the ruse. Adam then suggests Don eat some of the chicken salad, which was the source of Marcy's illness, in order to force Marcy to take care of their grandson.
62	6	"Couples Therapy"	Terry Hughes	Gregg Mettler	April 30, 2020	6.59
Adam buys a boat without telling Andi, and spends the next few days before it's delivered trying to trick her into making the boat her idea. When Andi doesn't bite, Adam agrees to couples therapy after learning from Don about his "ringer" therapist, Dr. Chuck, who always agrees with the husband. Unfortunately, when they arrive at the office, Adam learns he and Andi will be counseled by Dr. Felicia.
63	7	"Dude, Where's My Boat?"	Ben Weiss	Farhan Arshad	April 30, 2020	6.07
Adam notices his boat missing from the driveway, only to see it reappear a little later. He teams up with Lowell to find the culprit, strongly suspecting that Joe took it in order to spend time with Don, but Adam couldn't be more wrong. Meanwhile, Kate starts a job at a mall clothing store. When her boss says she has assistant manager potential, Kate tells Andi that she no longer wants to attend college.
64	8	"Adam's Not Sorry"	Terry Hughes	Tommy Johnagin	May 7, 2020	6.10
After learning to be more assertive in his therapy sessions with Marcy held by Dr. Felicia, Don decides to take charge at an auction and bid on a house that Adam insists they don't want. After both brothers refuse to apologize for their actions, they end up in "couples" therapy with Dr. Felicia, who soon brings in Joe and Bev, too. Don tells Adam he just wanted to make more decisions for the business, but after learning how much pressure Adam deals with, he decides things should go back to the way they were. Meanwhile, Bev cajoles Andi into throwing her a "surprise" birthday party, but Joe warns Andi that Bev is very difficult to please.
65	9	"Stuck in the Middle with You"	Anthony Rich	Jessica Runck	May 14, 2020	5.67
Andi's mother Alice (Nancy Lenehan) makes a surprise visit and, as usual, Adam gets put in the middle as a "buffer" whenever Alice or Andi want to communicate bad news to the other. This becomes especially difficult for Adam when Alice tells him that she's divorcing Andi's father. Adam forces mother and daughter to go out, have a few drinks, and finally communicate with each other. This backfires when Andi comes home and says they got along so well that she wants her mom to stay longer.
66	10	"Full Metal Teddy"	Anthony Rich	John "Jack" O'Brien	May 21, 2020	5.42
When Teddy's grades are horrible due to refusing to do his homework, Adam threatens to send him to military school, but Teddy calls his bluff and says military school might be just what he needs. Knowing they can't afford military school, Adam and Andi try to come up with alternative ways to straighten out their son. Unknown to them, Kate is secretly helping Teddy navigate their parents' punishments. However, Adam has an ace up his sleeve: putting Teddy through the military school of Joe.
67	11	"Adam and Andi See Other People"	Anthony Rich	Tommy Johnagin	May 28, 2020	5.06
After learning that Don and Marcy blew them off to go out with another couple, Adam and Andi seek out a different couple to hang with. Their attempt doesn't work out well when they have dinner with a couple of vegan Buddhists. After conversing with Lowell, Adam and Andi realize that their perfect couple friends are Don and Marcy. It turns out Don and Marcy have quickly grown tired of their other friends, and they reconcile with Adam and Andi.
68	12	"Driving Miss Katie"	Anthony Rich	Steve Joe	June 4, 2020	4.84
Adam has trouble helping Kate learn to drive, but she surprisingly passes her driving test at the DMV. At the same time, Adam learns his own license expired three months ago and he has to take a written refresher test, which he fails. Adam then has difficulty seeing Kate gain the freedom that a driver's license provides. Elsewhere, Don turns to Lowell for assistance with romancing Marcy.
69	13	"Happy Ann-RV-sary"	Gail Mancuso	Mark Gross	June 11, 2020	5.03
After hearing how Don learned one of Marcy's secret desires and took her on a balloon ride for their 25th anniversary, Adam is determined to do something equally special for his and Andi's 20th anniversary. He enlists Lowell to find out something Andi secretly likes, but Andi figures out what Lowell is doing and uses him as a double agent to get what she wants. Undeterred, Adam decides to recreate the RV trip he and Andi took on their honeymoon, which Andi secretly hated, and they take Don and Marcy along. After a rough night in the woods, Adam truly surprises Andi by parking the RV at a resort she has been wanting to visit for a long time.

== Ratings ==
Man with a Plan : U.S. viewers per episode (millions)

Season	Episode number																						Average
Season	1	2	3	4	5	6	7	8	9	10	11	12	13	14	15	16	17	18	19	20	21	22	Average
1	7.42	5.95	6.26	6.18	5.98	6.18	6.62	6.17	6.55	7.70	7.69	7.25	7.20	6.75	6.61	6.34	5.32	5.33	5.42	5.36	5.16	5.73	6.33
2	5.38	5.44	5.70	6.42	5.70	5.61	6.68	6.74	6.64	6.46	5.92	5.90	6.35	5.45	5.44	5.48	5.06	4.79	4.91	5.46	5.69	–	5.77
3	6.17	5.63	5.26	5.94	4.93	5.30	5.09	5.40	5.32	5.06	5.03	5.32	4.87	–									5.33
4	7.01	5.96	5.60	6.56	5.84	6.59	6.07	6.10	5.67	5.42	5.06	4.84	5.03	–									TBD

Audience measurement performed by Nielsen Media Research

=== Season 1 ===
Viewership and ratings per episode of List of Man with a Plan episodes
No.	Title	Air date	Rating/share (18–49)	Viewers (millions)
1	"Pilot"	October 24, 2016	1.6/5	7.42
2	"Two Tickets to Paradise"	October 31, 2016	1.3/5	5.95
3	"The Puppet Theatre"	November 7, 2016	1.4/4	6.26
4	"Un-Dressed"	November 14, 2016	1.3/5	5.18
5	"Thanksgiving"	November 21, 2016	1.3/5	5.98
6	"Holey War"	December 5, 2016	1.2/4	6.18
7	"Winter Has Come"	December 12, 2016	1.2/4	6.62
8	"Adam Steps Up"	December 19, 2016	1.1/4	6.17
9	"What About Bob?"	January 2, 2017	1.2/4	6.55
10	"A Dinner Gone Wrong"	January 16, 2017	1.5/5	7.70
11	"The Talk"	January 23, 2017	1.6/5	7.69
12	"The Three Amigos"	February 6, 2017	1.4/5	7.25
13	"Valentine's Day"	February 13, 2017	1.4/5	7.20
14	"Kate's First Date"	February 20, 2017	1.3/5	6.75
15	"Assisted Living"	February 27, 2017	1.2/4	6.62
16	"The A Team"	March 13, 2017	1.1/4	6.34
17	"Doctor No"	March 20, 2017	1.0/4	5.32
18	"The Blame Game"	April 10, 2017	1.0/4	5.33
19	"Spring Fling"	April 17, 2017	1.0/4	5.42
20	"Dirty Money"	May 1, 2017	1.0/4	5.36
21	"Operation False Freedom"	May 8, 2017	1.0/4	5.16
22	"Buzzer Beater"	May 15, 2017	1.1/4	5.73

=== Season 2 ===
Viewership and ratings per episode of List of Man with a Plan episodes
No.	Title	Air date	Rating/share (18–49)	Viewers (millions)
1	"The Silver Fox"	November 13, 2017	1.0/4	5.38
2	"Andi's Boyfriend"	November 20, 2017	1.0/4	5.44
3	"The Parents Strike Back"	November 27, 2017	1.1/4	5.70
4	"Into the Weeds"	December 4, 2017	1.1/4	6.42
5	"Battle of the Sexists"	December 11, 2017	1.0/4	5.70
6	"Adam Gets Neighborly"	December 18, 2017	0.9/3	5.61
7	"We Can Be Heroes"	January 15, 2018	1.2/5	6.68
8	"Lice Lice Baby"	January 22, 2018	1.2/4	6.74
9	"The Gunfight"	January 29, 2018	1.1/4	6.64
10	"Adam's Turtle-y Awesome Valentine's Day"	February 5, 2018	1.1/4	6.46
11	"Guess Who's Coming to Breakfast, Lunch and Dinner"	February 26, 2018	1.0/4	5.92
12	"Everybody's a Winner"	March 5, 2018	1.0/4	5.90
13	"The Party Planner"	March 12, 2018	1.0/4	6.35
14	"March Madness"	March 19, 2018	0.9/4	5.45
15	"Out with the In-Laws"	March 26, 2018	0.9/4	5.44
16	"April Fools"	April 9, 2018	0.9/4	5.48
17	"King for a Day"	April 16, 2018	0.8/3	5.06
18	"The Burns System"	April 30, 2018	0.8/3	4.79
19	"We Hate Money"	May 7, 2018	0.9/4	4.91
20	"We Got a Girl"	May 14, 2018	1.0/4	5.46
21	"Family Business"	May 21, 2018	1.0/4	5.69

=== Season 3 ===
Viewership and ratings per episode of List of Man with a Plan episodes
No.	Title	Air date	Rating/share (18–49)	Viewers (millions)
1	"Wife-Proof"	February 4, 2019	1.1/5	6.17
2	"Yeah, Maybe"	February 11, 2019	1.0/5	5.63
3	"Put Him on the Ground"	February 18, 2019	0.9/4	5.26
4	"Adam's Wall Hole Bowl"	February 25, 2019	1.0/5	5.94
5	"The New Old School"	March 4, 2019	0.7/3	4.93
6	"Semi-Indecent Proposal"	March 11, 2019	0.8/3	5.30
7	"Hotel Hanky Panky"	March 18, 2019	0.9/4	5.09
8	"Adam's Ribs"	March 25, 2019	0.8/4	5.40
9	"Adam Acts His Age"	April 1, 2019	0.8/4	5.32
10	"We Don't Need Another Hero"	April 15, 2019	0.9/4	5.06
11	"Cabin Fever"	April 22, 2019	0.7/3	5.03
12	"Clean Country Living"	April 29, 2019	0.8/4	5.32
13	"The Intervention(s)"	May 6, 2019	0.8/4	4.87

=== Season 4 ===
Viewership and ratings per episode of List of Man with a Plan episodes
No.	Title	Air date	Rating (18–49)	Viewers (millions)
1	"The V-Word"	April 2, 2020	0.9	7.01
2	"Adam's Big Little Lie"	April 9, 2020	0.7	5.96
3	"The Ex Files"	April 9, 2020	0.7	5.60
4	"Going All the Way"	April 16, 2020	0.7	6.56
5	"Winner Winner Chicken Salad"	April 23, 2020	0.7	5.84
6	"Couples Therapy"	April 30, 2020	0.7	6.59
7	"Dude, Where's My Boat?"	April 30, 2020	0.7	6.07
8	"Adam's Not Sorry"	May 7, 2020	0.8	6.10
9	"Stuck in the Middle with You"	May 14, 2020	0.7	5.67
10	"Full Metal Teddy"	May 21, 2020	0.6	5.42
11	"Adam and Andi See Other People"	May 28, 2020	0.6	5.06
12	"Driving Miss Katie"	June 4, 2020	0.6	4.84
13	"Happy Ann-RV-sary"	June 11, 2020	0.6	5.03
