= Take Me Home Tonight (film) =

2011 film by Michael Dowse

- Theatrical release poster
- Directed by: Michael Dowse
- Screenplay by: Jackie Filgo; Jeff Filgo
- Story by: Topher Grace; Gordon Kaywin
- Produced by: Ryan Kavanaugh; Jim Whitaker; Susan Bowen
- Starring: Topher Grace; Anna Faris; Dan Fogler; Teresa Palmer
- Cinematography: Terry Stacey
- Edited by: Lee Haxall
- Music by: Trevor Horn
- Production companies: Imagine Entertainment; Rogue
- Distributed by: Relativity Media (United States); Universal Pictures (International)
- Release dates: March 2, 2011 (Los Angeles premiere); March 4, 2011 (United States)
- Running time: 97 minutes
- Country: United States
- Language: English
- Budget: $19 million
- Box office: $7.4 million

Take Me Home Tonight is a 2011 American comedy-drama film directed by Michael Dowse and starring Topher Grace and Anna Faris alongside Dan Fogler and Teresa Palmer. The screenplay was written by Jackie and Jeff Filgo, former writers of the television sitcom That '70s Show, of which Grace was a cast member. The film follows a recent college graduate who wants to change his career plans after his old high school crush invites him to a party. It was released to mixed reviews and was a box-office bomb.

Shooting began on the week starting February 19, 2007, in Phoenix, Arizona. The film received its wide theatrical release on March 4, 2011 by Relativity Media in the United States, with Universal Pictures releasing in other territories.

The title comes from the 1986 Eddie Money song of the same name, also played in the theatrical trailer and on the menu screen of the Blu-ray and DVD releases. Despite having the same name, it never actually appears in the film.

== Plot ==
Matt Franklin is a recent MIT graduate, working at a Los Angeles Suncoast Video store in 1988 while trying to figure out what he wants to do with his life, something that his LAPD officer father has grown impatient with. When Matt's high school crush, Tori Frederking, walks into the store, he lies that he works at Goldman Sachs. Tori invites Matt to a Labor Day party, hosted by Matt's twin sister Wendy's boyfriend, Kyle.

When Matt, Wendy, and Matt's best friend, Barry Nathan, head to the party, Barry steals a Mercedes-Benz convertible from the car dealership he got fired from earlier that day, saying Matt needs it to impress Tori. At the party, Matt awkwardly tries to woo her. Barry snorts some cocaine he found in the glove box of the stolen car and gets involved in a dance-off, and Kyle proposes to Wendy in front of everyone. Matt is disappointed she accepts, as he thinks Kyle will hold her back.

Tori takes Matt and Barry to her boss's party in Beverly Hills. Barry has a wild sexual encounter with Trish, an older woman, while Matt and Tori grow closer, after Matt's successful "put down" of Tori's boss, a habitual sexual harasser. They go into a neighboring backyard where they jump on a trampoline, play truth or dare, and end up having sex.

Wendy shares her unopened admissions letter from Cambridge for graduate school with Kyle, and discovers she was not accepted. He is visibly relieved, while she is upset.

Matt confesses that he doesn't work at Goldman Sachs. Tori storms off, leaving him guilt-ridden. He finds Barry and they leave the party. Barry chastises Matt for not trying to have just one night of enjoyment and offers him a line of cocaine while driving. He tries to snort it, but ends up driving the convertible into a ditch. A police cruiser arrives, and it turns out to be Matt's dad.

Already disappointed with Matt's unwillingness to choose a career path, he further damages the convertible, coercing him to get a better job to pay off the damages. Matt apologizes for being such a failure, to which his dad replies that, as he's never tried, he has never really failed. His father just wants Matt to take a shot at something—anything—in life.

Knowing Tori has left her car at the party, Matt and Barry go back, where bets are being placed on who will "ride the ball", a giant, steel sphere that someone rides inside as it is rolled down a hill. Matt finds Tori and tries to apologize, but she is unwilling to forgive him.

Feeling he has nothing left to lose, Matt volunteers to "ride the ball". After making an impressive speech he gets inside it. Propelled down the hill, it ends up hitting several parked cars, flys off an embankment, and crashes through a wooden fence into a backyard swimming pool. Trapped inside and underwater, he almost drowns before escaping the sunken ball.

Barry rushes to the scene and is ecstatic to find Matt still alive. Walking arm in arm, they head back towards the party, and they meet up with Wendy and Tori, who are also elated to find him alive. Matt apologizes to Tori, she finally forgives him, and then gives him her phone number. They return to the party as dawn approaches. All who are still there cheer at Matt's successful return.

Wendy, realizing Matt was right, breaks up with Kyle, who experiences a crying breakdown. Barry—pondering his future while talking to Ashley, a Goth girl he met at the party, who tells him that maybe he should go to college—winds up sexually entangled with her. Outside, Matt boldly kisses Tori goodbye for the night because he still has her phone number to call.

Matt's dad, investigating the giant steel ball in the pool, smirks proudly when he finds, and then pockets, his son's name tag. Matt, Barry and Wendy stagger out of the party house, leaving together as the sun rises.

== Cast ==
- Topher Grace as Matthew "Matt" Franklin
- Anna Faris as Wendy Franklin
- Dan Fogler as Barry Nathan
- Teresa Palmer as Tori Frederking
- Chris Pratt as Kyle Masterson
- Michael Biehn as Bill Franklin
- Lucy Punch as Shelly
- Demetri Martin as Carlos
- Michael Ian Black as Pete Bering
- Seth Gabel as Brent Tufford
- Nathalie Kelley as Beth
- Candace Kroslak as Ally
- Ryan Bittle as Rick Herrington
- Robert Hoffman as Tyler "Dance Machine" Jones
  - referred to as Tyler Cummings in dialogue
- Edwin Hodge as Bryce
- Jay Jablonski as Benji
- Kimberly Dearing as Betsy
- Angie Everhart as Trish Anderson
- Michelle Trachtenberg as Ashley
- Bob Odenkirk as Mike
- Wade Allain-Marcus as Broader

== Production ==
Principal photography was completed in 2007, but Universal Studios shelved the film until its 2011 theatrical release. Topher Grace posted that the release of the film was delayed when the studio did not know how to handle and promote a youth comedy film with portrayals of cocaine use, as the drug was prominent in the 1980s.

Its release remained delayed until Relativity Media subsidiary Rogue acquired the film from Universal Pictures for $10 million. The film was previously titled Young Americans and Kids in America, titles of popular songs by David Bowie and Kim Wilde.

On March 3, 2011, while being interviewed on Ryan Seacrest's 102.7 KIIS FM radio show, Topher Grace announced to former American Idol contestant Chris Medina that 1% of the film's box office revenue would be donated to the care of Medina's injured fiancée, Juliana Ramos. Juliana was involved in a serious car accident in 2009 and suffered a traumatic brain injury. Her story has been widely followed across the nation since Medina's appearance on American Idol.

== Release ==
The film was released in the United States on March 4, 2011. Relativity released a trailer for the film in December 2010.

=== Box office ===
Take Me Home Tonight was a box office flop. The film debuted at #11, with $3,464,679 during its opening weekend in 2,003 theaters in North America. The film grossed $6,928,068 in North America, failing to recoup its $19 million budget.

=== Critical response ===
On Rotten Tomatoes, the film holds a 27% approval rating based on 110 reviews with an average rating of 4.60/10. The site's critical consensus reads, "It has a charming sweetness about it, but Take Me Home Tonight is neither funny nor original enough to live up to the comedies it evokes." On Metacritic, the film has a score of 42 out of 100, based on 38 critics, indicating "mixed or average reviews". Audiences surveyed by CinemaScore gave the film a grade C on scale of A to F.

Peter Travers of Rolling Stone wrote that "Take Me Home Tonight has just enough heart and retro party spirit to hold the line before familiarity breeds contempt." Critics have praised the leads and felt the film was heartwarming but was not very original or funny. David Denby of The New Yorker wrote: "The movie is amiable enough: the young Australian actress Teresa Palmer is lovely and crisp, and the Canadian writer-director Michael Dowse manages the party traffic well."

Colin Covert of the Minneapolis Star Tribune gave the film 3 out of 4 stars, writing that the movie is a "winning rag bag of gags, combining fast-paced physical shtick with a clever script. There's romantic comedy savvy period satire and "Jackass"-style stunts...Take Me Home Tonight is a time capsule from the heyday of John Hughes and Cameron Crowe, a time when comedies allowed their characters to be human as well as humorous."

=== Accolades ===
Teen Choice Awards

- 2011 - Choice Movie Actress: Comedy for Anna Faris (Nominated)

=== Home media ===
The DVD and Blu-ray were released on July 19, 2011. The Blu-ray edition includes a digital copy.
