= Men Behaving Badly (American TV series) =

American sitcom television series

- Genre: Sitcom
- Created by: Matthew Carlson
- Based on: Men Behaving Badly by Simon Nye
- Written by: Matthew Carlson
- Starring: Rob Schneider; Ron Eldard; Justine Bateman
- Composer: Ben Vaughn
- Country of origin: United States
- Original language: English
- No. of seasons: 2
- No. of episodes: 35 (7 unaired)

Production
- Executive producers: Matthew Carlson; Harvey Myman; Simon Nye; Marcy Carsey; Tom Werner; Caryn Mandabach; James Burrows; Tom Brady; John Bowman; Rob Schneider; Jeff Martin; Steve Levitan
- Producer: Beryl Vertue
- Running time: 30 minutes
- Production companies: Vanity Logo Productions; The Carsey-Werner Company

Original release
- Network: NBC
- Release: September 18, 1996 – December 17, 1997

Related
- Men Behaving Badly (British TV series)

Men Behaving Badly is an American sitcom television series on NBC from September 18, 1996, to December 17, 1997. It is based on the 1992 British sitcom of the same name.

== Synopsis ==
Set in Indianapolis, Indiana, the show starred Rob Schneider, Ron Eldard, and Justine Bateman. Kevin (Eldard) and Jamie (Schneider) were college buddies sharing an apartment and living out a second childhood, much to the chagrin of Kevin's girlfriend Sarah (Bateman). Brenda (Dina Spybey) was an upstairs neighbor that Jamie flirted with.

== Cast ==
- Rob Schneider as Jamie Coleman
- Ron Eldard as Kevin Murphy (season 1)
- Justine Bateman as Sarah Stretten (season 1)
- Dina Spybey as Brenda Mikowski
- Julia Campbell as Cherie Miller (season 1)
- Ken Marino as Steve Coprin (season 2)
- Jenica Bergere as Katie (season 2)

Eldard and Bateman left after the first season. They were replaced by Ken Marino and Jenica Bergere, and Spybey was promoted from recurring to series regular.

== Reception ==
Reviewers found the show's content to be too risqué, pushing its brand of gross-out humor beyond all but the raciest cable shows of the day. The first season ran for 22 episodes. Altogether 13 episodes were completed for the second season, albeit with Schneider as the sole original member in the main cast. Only six of those completed episodes ever aired during the initial run because of dropping ratings and steep competition from CBS's Touched by an Angel, Fox's The Simpsons, and ABC's The Wonderful World of Disney.

== Home media ==
The entire series of 35 episodes was released as a Region 1 DVD box set in February 2007.

== Episodes ==
=== Series overview ===
Season	Episodes	Originally released	
Season	Episodes	First released	Last released
1	22	September 18, 1996	June 4, 1997
2	13	September 28, 1997	December 17, 1997

=== Season 1 (1996–97) ===
No. overall	No. in season	Title	Directed by	Written by	Original release date	Prod. code	U.S. viewers (millions)
1	1	"Babies Having Babies"	James Burrows	Matthew Carlson	September 18, 1996	101	14.8
2	2	"Temptation"	James Burrows	Gary Murphy & Neil Thompson	September 25, 1996	103	11.8
3	3	"The Bed"	James Burrows	Matthew Carlson	October 2, 1996	102	11.0
4	4	"Hot Parkas"	Jeff Melman	Tom Brady	October 23, 1996	105	11.5
5	5	"Getting the Bugs Out"	James Burrows	Billiam Coronel	October 30, 1996	104	11.5
6	6	"Jamie's in Love"	James Burrows	Matthew Carlson	November 6, 1996	106	10.1
7	7	"Drunken Proposal"	Michael Zinberg	Gary Murphy & Neil Thompson	November 13, 1996	109	9.5
8	8	"Sarah's Vestigial Organ"	Jeff Melman	Bill Freiberger	November 20, 1996	108	9.1
9	9	"Road Trip"	Tom Cherones	Gary Murphy & Neil Thompson	December 11, 1996	107	10.1
10	10	"Christmas"	Rod Daniel	Matthew Carlson	December 18, 1996	113	11.3
11	11	"Wet Nurse"	Ellen Gittelsohn	John Frink & Don Payne	January 8, 1997	111	11.77
12	12	"The Odds Couple"	James Burrows	Tom Brady	January 15, 1997	110	11.48
13	13	"Jamie Needs a Kid"	Michael Zinberg	Reid Harrison	February 5, 1997	112	10.33
14	14	"Playing Doctor"	James Burrows	John Frink & Don Payne	February 12, 1997	115	10.40
15	15	"Brenda Is Moved"	Michael Zinberg	Tom Brady	February 19, 1997	116	10.42
16	16	"I Am What I Am"	Michael Zinberg	Story by : Tom Brady & Bill Freiberger; Teleplay by : Tom Brady	April 2, 1997	119	11.74
17	17	"The Party Favor"	Michael Zinberg	Brown Mandell	April 9, 1997	117	12.13
18	18	"Getting Rid of Harry"	Rick Beren	Simon Nye	April 16, 1997	118	10.14
19	19	"After Midnight"	Shelley Jensen	Steven Levitan	May 7, 1997	122	9.08
20	20	"Testing, Testing"	Michael Zinberg	Rob Hanning	May 14, 1997	120	8.67
21	21	"It's Good to Be Dead"	Michael Lembeck	Rick Nyholm	May 21, 1997	121	7.66
22	22	"The Box"	Brian K. Roberts	Joe Becker & Jim Longstreet	June 4, 1997	114	8.78

=== Season 2 (1997) ===
No. overall	No. in season	Title	Directed by	Written by	Original release date	Prod. code	U.S. viewers (millions)
23	1	"No Retreat, No Surrender"	Michael Zinberg	Story by : Jeff Martin; Teleplay by : John Bowman & Tom Brady	September 28, 1997	204	11.23
24	2	"Got Milk?"	Michael Zinberg	Stacie Lipp	October 5, 1997	202	9.70
25	3	"The Sting"	Michael Zinberg	Jeff Filgo & Jackie Filgo	October 12, 1997	205	8.84
26	4	"Spoils of War"	Rod Daniel	Rick Nyholm	November 2, 1997	206	7.20
27	5	"Special Delivery"	Sam Simon	Jeff Filgo & Jackie Filgo	November 9, 1997	209	8.35
28	6	"The Gift of Jami"	Michael Zinberg	Matt Tarses	December 17, 1997	212	8.40
29	7	"Here We Go Again"	Michael Zinberg	Story by : John Bowman; Teleplay by : Jeff Martin & Tom Brady	Unaired	201	N/A
30	8	"Jamie's Got Next"	Michael Zinberg	Matt Tarses	Unaired	203	N/A
31	9	"The Tape"	Michael Zinberg	Amy Welsh	Unaired	207	N/A
32	10	"The Truth About Cats and Ducks"	Rod Daniel	Bill Wrubel	Unaired	208	N/A
33	11	"The Fur Man Cometh"	Michael Zinberg	Stacie Lipp	Unaired	210	N/A
34	12	"Welcome to JamieCo"	Michael Zinberg	Stacie Lipp	Unaired	211	N/A
35	13	"Carpe Dino"	Michael Zinberg	Rick Nyholm	Unaired	213	N/A
