= That '70s Show season 1 =

That '70s Show
- Season 1
- DVD cover
- Starring: Topher Grace; Mila Kunis; Ashton Kutcher; Danny Masterson; Laura Prepon; Wilmer Valderrama; Debra Jo Rupp; Kurtwood Smith; Tanya Roberts; Don Stark
- No. of episodes: 25

Release
- Original network: Fox
- Original release: August 23, 1998 – July 26, 1999

Season chronology
- Next → Season 2

The first season of That '70s Show, an American television series, aired on Fox from August 23, 1998, to July 26, 1999. The region 1 DVD was released on October 26, 2004. The season is set between 1976 and 1977. The first twelve episodes and the 23rd episode were set in 1976, then the series transitioned to 1977 for the remainder of the season.

The major storylines this season involve Eric and Donna's close friendship turning into romance, Red struggling to provide for his family due to his hours being cut back, Kitty dealing with her children growing up and trying to play nice with her mother-in-law, Kelso's relationship with Jackie (and his frequent attempts to break up with her), Fez learning about life in America, Hyde's rough home life and strained relationship with his mother, and Bob and Midge beginning to have marital problems.

== Cast ==
=== Main ===
- Topher Grace as Eric Forman
- Mila Kunis as Jackie Burkhart
- Ashton Kutcher as Michael Kelso
- Danny Masterson as Steven Hyde
- Laura Prepon as Donna Pinciotti
- Wilmer Valderrama as Fez
- Debra Jo Rupp as Kitty Forman
- Kurtwood Smith as Red Forman
- Tanya Roberts as Midge Pinciotti
- Don Stark as Bob Pinciotti

=== Special guest ===
- Danny Bonaduce as Ricky
- Marion Ross as Bernice Forman
- Joseph Gordon-Levitt as Buddy
- Ernie Ladd as Manager
- Gary Owens (Note: In addition to being credited in the 'also starring' bill in "The Good Son", Owens also guest starred in two episodes as the Narrator.) as Announcer
- Katey Sagal (Note: Also had in uncredited role in two episodes.) as Edna Hyde
- Gloria Gaynor as Mrs. Clark

=== Recurring ===
- Paul Kreppel as Jack Burkhart
- Lisa Robin Kelly as Laurie Forman

=== Guest ===
- Eve Plumb as Mrs. Burkhart
- Kevin Farley as Matthew Erdman
- Nick Bakay as Gus
- The Rock as Rocky Johnson
- Ken Shamrock as Wrestler (uncredited)
- Jeff Hardy as Wrestler (uncredited)
- Matt Hardy as Wrestler (uncredited)
- Terry Turner as Announcer (uncredited)
- Jennifer Lyons as Pam Macy
- Grey DeLisle as Ms. Kaminsky
- Paul Connor as Timmy Thompson
- Carolyn Hennesy as Sharon Singer
- Carlos Alazraqui as Man
- Mitch Pileggi as Bull
- Arlene Pileggi as Joy

== Episodes ==
No. overall	No. in season	Title	Directed by	Written by	Original release date	Prod. code	Viewers (millions)
1	1	"That '70s Pilot"	Terry Hughes	Bonnie Turner & Terry Turner & Mark Brazill	August 23, 1998	101	12.56
On May 17, 1976, Red Forman and his wife Kitty hand the keys to their Oldsmobile Vista Cruiser over to their son, Eric. Through persuasion from his friends, Eric uses the car to go out of town for a Todd Rundgren concert in Milwaukee with his closest friends: his neighbor, Donna Pinciotti, Steven Hyde, and Michael Kelso. Eric also decides to invite a new foreign exchange student from school, named 'Fez'. Kelso's wealthy girlfriend Jackie Burkhart also invites herself along (much to the gang's dismay). Meanwhile, Eric becomes uncomfortable around Donna when Kelso inadvertently tells Eric that Donna likes him. On the way to the concert, the car's battery dies, and the only way the gang can get a new one is if they give up two of their concert tickets to the mechanic. The rest of the group forces Kelso to give up his and Jackie's tickets. While the rest are at the concert, Jackie and Kelso make out in the car, and Jackie asks Kelso if he wants to break up with her. Kelso, who has been constantly telling the others that he wants to break up with Jackie, tells her he doesn't so they can continue to make out. At the end of the episode, Eric and Donna sit on the hood of the car and before she goes home, Donna kisses him.
2	2	"Eric's Birthday"	David Trainer	Bonnie Turner & Terry Turner	August 30, 1998	102	11.12
Eric's 17th birthday is approaching, and he tries to prevent his mother, Kitty, from throwing him a surprise birthday party to no avail. Meanwhile, Eric's older sister, Laurie, returns home from college for a visit, and Kelso tries, unsuccessfully, to attract her attention even though he is in a relationship with Jackie. Also, Eric tells Red that he wants a cassette tape player for the Vista Cruiser as his birthday present, only for Red to gift him an 8-track tape player instead. Donna is also stressing over what she should get Eric for his birthday, mostly because she is unsure of the state of her relationship with Eric after she kissed him. Desperate for help, Donna reveals to Jackie that she kissed Eric, and Jackie helps her choose a meaningful gift for him - a candle.
3	3	"Streaking"	David Trainer	Eric Gilliland	September 6, 1998	103	7.03
Jackie's father, a city councilman, arranges for President Gerald Ford to stop at Point Place as part of his re-election campaign. The principal of Point Place High School makes a speech warning the students against any "maladjusted" activity, which of course gives Hyde the idea to "fight the power"; the guys then decide to streak when President Ford comes to town. Meanwhile, Bob wants Red to ask President Ford a question in the Q&A. Red agrees, however, Bob gives him a "crappy" question, leading Red to take a stand and ask what he wants anyway. Also, Donna refuses to wear an American flag jumpsuit her father, Bob, gives her as it will embarrass her. On the day of the President's visit, the guys decide at the last minute not to streak, as there are too many guard dogs and Secret Service agents. However, when Red gets up to ask his question, he begins to crack under the pressure. In desperation, Eric puts on a Nixon mask and streaks across the auditorium, motivating Red to ask Ford, "How the hell could you pardon Nixon?".
4	4	"Battle of the Sexists"	David Trainer	Joshua Sternin & Jeffrey Ventimilia	September 20, 1998	104	10.84
Eric and Donna argue, after she continuously defeats him in various sports and games. Upon seeing this, Jackie pressures Donna to let Eric win for the sake of his ego and their relationship, while Hyde and Fez pressure Kelso to finally stand up to Jackie and her constant domineering. Meanwhile, Red's job hours at the auto plant are cut back drastically and he is forced to stay home, keeping himself occupied by "fixing" things, much to Kitty's dismay.
5	5	"Eric's Burger Job"	David Trainer	Mark Brazill	September 27, 1998	106	10.28
Donna drops some quite obvious hints that she wants to hang out in her house with Eric - alone. However, Eric doesn't get the hints and Kelso convinces her to have a party, which Donna only agrees to after Eric says he will come. The guys then all go to Fatso Burger for job interviews, but only Eric ends up hired. However, Eric finds that he and Donna can't spend as much time together because of it. Meanwhile, Jackie gets upset at Kelso for not having a job. On the day of the party, Donna decides to go see Eric at work because she's depressed that they can't spend time together, however Eric turns her down as he is working. But when Eric finally comes home, he is too late as Donna's parents, Bob and Midge, have arrived home early. This, along with being treated poorly by his boss, prompts Eric to quit his job so he can spend more time with Donna.
6	6	"The Keg"	David Trainer	Dave Schiff	October 25, 1998	107	10.19
The gang finds a keg in the middle of the road after skipping school. At the behest of Kelso, they then decide to throw a party in the pool of a vacant home that Jackie's mother is attempting to sell. Meanwhile, Kitty invites Bob and Midge over and, while discussing what their children are up to, Red figures out that the gang are throwing a party and he and Bob set out to find them. However, at the pool, the kids soon discovers they need a tap to extract the beer. Eric sends Kelso out with his gas money to purchase one at the liquor store. However, after leaving the store, Kelso has the tap broken in half by two bullies, forcing Eric to sneak home and steal his father's tap. He manages to succeed, as Kitty and Midge get very drunk while watching TV. However, the rest of the gang gets caught as Jackie's mom begins showing the house to potential buyers and they all try to unsuccessfully hide. Eric returns with Red's tap, however by this point, all of the partygoers have been forced to leave by the cops, as Red and Bob have arrived. Red then tells Eric to take Donna home, while he and Bob keep the keg for themselves.
7	7	"That Disco Episode"	David Trainer	Bonnie Turner & Terry Turner	November 8, 1998	109	12.83
The gang plan to go to a disco in Kenosha. Hyde refuses to go at first, since he hates disco and can't dance. But when Donna says she would love to go, Hyde decides to take dancing lessons from Kitty so he can impress Donna. However, Bob walks in on Kitty and Hyde dancing and mistakenly thinks they are having an affair. Midge tries to confront Kitty about it, but this only makes Kitty think that Midge is having an affair. Bob tells Red about it, and Red suggests killing Hyde, before revealing to Bob that he knew that Kitty was teaching Hyde to dance the whole time. At the disco, it becomes clear that Kelso cannot dance, which embarrasses Jackie. However, Fez convinces Jackie to dance with him, revealing that he is a great dancer. This prompts Hyde to ask Donna to dance with him, after Eric decides he doesn't want to dance. During the dance, Hyde tries to make a move on Donna, which she rejects. Meanwhile, Fez and Jackie are outside talking, when Kelso storms out of the disco and threatens Fez to stay away from his girlfriend.
8	8	"Drive-In"	David Trainer	Mark Hudis	November 15, 1998	108	11.73
Eric and Donna go to watch The Omen at the drive-in with Kelso and Jackie. However, Jackie and Kelso spend the whole evening making out aggressively in the backseat, making the situation even more awkward for Eric and Donna, eventually forcing them to exit the car. Donna and Eric sit on the hood of the cruiser, and eventually end up making out. In the meantime, Fez's host parents forbid him from listening to rock music, as they feel it is "the devil's music". Hyde decides to help Fez by sneaking rock albums into Fez's host home, hiding them in Pat Boone covers and listening to them with headphones. Meanwhile, Kitty and Red decide to go out because Kitty thinks their marriage is too predictable; they decide to go to a posh restaurant. However, upon arriving, Kitty and Red learn that the restaurant had burnt down and has been replaced with a tacky themed restaurant. Disgusted, Red and Kitty leave and wind up in their usual place; however, they decide to have sex in their car to spice things up.
9	9	"Thanksgiving"	David Trainer	Jackie Behan & Jeff Filgo	November 22, 1998	110	11.50
On November 24, 1976, Laurie brings her friend Kate (Jenny Maguire) home with her for Thanksgiving, while Red's mother, Bernice, constantly calls, asking about Thanksgiving dinner, much to Kitty's annoyance. Meanwhile, Donna is angry when she finds out Kate kissed Eric, and when Bob offers Red a job at his appliance store as a way to help the Foremans out, Red is reluctant to accept it.
10	10	"Sunday, Bloody Sunday"	David Trainer	Linda Wallem	November 29, 1998	105	11.25
On October 24, 1976, Red's unbearable mother (Marion Ross) comes to spend a Sunday with the family, Kitty tries to quit smoking, and Eric is stressing over a school assignment that is due the next day. Meanwhile, Kelso wants to break up with Jackie, but doesn't know how to tell her.
11	11	"Eric's Buddy"	David Trainer	Philip Stark	December 6, 1998	114	11.39
Eric starts hanging out with his lab partner, Buddy (Joseph Gordon-Levitt), which leaves his friends feeling neglected, but Eric discovers Buddy is homosexual after Buddy unexpectedly kisses him. Meanwhile, Red is having trouble helping customers at Bob's appliance store, Bargain Bob's.
12	12	"The Best Christmas Ever" "That '70s Christmas"	David Trainer	Terry Turner & Philip Stark	December 13, 1998	113	12.29
Red gives Eric $40 to buy a Christmas tree, but he, Hyde and Kelso cut one down along the interstate and decide to keep the money for beer and presents. Meanwhile, Red is forced by Bob to spend his Christmas Eve working at the store, and Laurie spikes the punch with vodka at Eric's Christmas party. Note: Chronologically, this is the final episode to take place in 1976, as the 23rd episode takes place in 1976 also.
13	13	"Ski Trip"	David Trainer	Jeff Filgo & Jackie Behan	January 17, 1999	115	13.20
On January 13, 1977, Kelso is caught making out with Pam Macy, causing Jackie to dump him. She then invites everyone except Kelso to her ski cabin, but soon regrets it, wanting to get back together with him. While at the cabin, Hyde decides to make a risky move on Donna, which he fails at and Donna ends up slapping Hyde in the face for his efforts. Meanwhile, Kitty releases an old grudge on Red involving their younger years. Note: This is the first episode of the series to take place in 1977.
14	14	"Stolen Car"	David Trainer	Mark Hudis	January 24, 1999	117	10.82
On January 21, 1977, Red takes away the keys to the Vista Cruiser from Eric after he notices a scratch on it, so the guys drive around in Kelso's cousin's car, which turns out to be stolen and the guys are detained. Meanwhile, Jackie wants to have sex with Kelso and is anxiously waiting for him to make the first move, and Bob isn't too pleased that Midge is taking a female empowerment class.
15	15	"That Wrestling Show"	David Trainer	Jeff Filgo & Jackie Behan	February 7, 1999	119	13.25
Kitty wants Red to spend more time with Eric, so he goes with the gang to a wrestling match. After sleeping with Kelso, Jackie is willing to do anything for him, so he won't get bored with her, which Kelso of course takes advantage of. Hyde and Fez listen to Bob's stories about his problems with Midge and her classes, in exchange for beer. Meanwhile, Kitty and Laurie attend Midge's therapy session, but discover it's not what it seems to be. Real-life pro wrestler Dwayne "The Rock" Johnson (billed as The Rock) plays his real-life father, wrestler Rocky Johnson, while Ken Shamrock, Matt Hardy, Jeff Hardy, and Ernie Ladd all have cameo appearances.
16	16	"First Date"	David Trainer	Mark Brazill	February 14, 1999	116	11.37
On February 14, 1977, Eric and Donna go on their first real date, where Eric plans to ask her to be his girlfriend. While Kelso and Jackie go shopping, Hyde wants to show his true feelings for Donna and hurries to interfere with Eric and Donna's date. Meanwhile, Red and Kitty realize they no longer have much in common with Bob and Midge. After shopping, Jackie and Kelso have sex once again in the car.
17	17	"The Pill"	David Trainer	Linda Wallem	February 21, 1999	118	14.09
Jackie thinks she may be pregnant and confides in Eric, who later tells Donna. Kelso eventually finds out and faints (with Fez on top of him, attempting to slap him awake). Donna discusses Jackie's problem with Midge and, feeling afraid for her own future, decides to begin using birth control. Meanwhile, Laurie tries to keep her failing college grades a secret from Red and Kitty. Bob eventually discovers Donna is on birth control pills and Eric gets in trouble when his parents find out. Jackie eventually discovers that she's not pregnant and decides to break up with Kelso.
18	18	"Career Day"	David Trainer	Joshua Sternin & Jeffrey Ventimilia	February 28, 1999	111	11.73
The gang goes to work with their parents on career day. Eric works with Kitty at the hospital, while Hyde and Fez visit Hyde's mom, Edna (Katey Sagal), their school's lunch lady. Donna visits her father at "Bargain Bob's" and inadvertently tells him she is embarrassed by his career. Kelso tries to understand his father's (Francis Guinan) profession, and Jackie and Red bond over fixing the Vista Cruiser. Absent: Tanya Roberts
19	19	"Prom Night"	David Trainer	Philip Stark	March 7, 1999	121	12.30
Kelso takes Pam Macy (Jennifer Lyons) to the prom to make Jackie jealous, so Jackie goes with Hyde instead, while Eric rents a hotel room intending to have sex with Donna after the prom (which doesn't happen). Meanwhile, Midge wants to start her own business, but Bob vehemently opposes the idea. At the end of the episode, Kelso and Jackie get back together, and Hyde takes Pam. This episode features Gloria Gaynor as the school's music teacher, performing her hit song "I Will Survive."
20	20	"A New Hope"	David Trainer	Joshua Sternin & Jeffrey Ventimilia	March 14, 1999	122	11.75
The gang sees Star Wars and Kelso is instantly obsessed, wanting to see it over and over again, much to Jackie's annoyance. Red is given his full-time status back at the plant. Meanwhile, Eric is annoyed with the son of Red's boss, David Milbank (Scott Whyte), trying to hit on Donna, prompting him to have a Star Wars-themed dream (Eric as Luke Skywalker, Hyde as Han Solo, Kelso as Chewbacca, Red as Obi-Wan Kenobi, Fez and Jackie as Imperial Stormtroopers, Donna as Princess Leia, David as Darth Vader, and Kitty as a cleaning woman using R2-D2 as a vacuum cleaner). Eric later finds out from David that the plant will be closing permanently soon and, after David makes a snide comment about Red, Eric punches him in the face.
21	21	"Water Tower"	David Trainer	Story by : Linda Wallem; Teleplay by : Jeff Filgo & Jackie Behan	June 14, 1999	123	6.78
The guys decide to paint a pot leaf on the town water tower. Kelso falls off the tower and breaks his arm, prompting Jackie to make Kelso believe that his injury was Hyde's fault. Meanwhile, Eric accidentally walks in on Red and Kitty having sex, traumatizing him.
22	22	"Punk Chick"	David Trainer	Dave Schiff	June 21, 1999	120	6.28
Hyde meets a girl (Jade Gordon) just like him, who wants Hyde to come to New York with her to start a punk band, but Eric disapproves of him leaving Point Place. Meanwhile, Kelso wants to make Red's Atari Pong more challenging, Jackie turns to Kitty for help on a home economics assignment, and Eric has problems making it to second base with Donna.
23	23	"Grandma's Dead"	David Trainer	Arthur F. Montmorency	July 12, 1999	112	7.35
Eric becomes convinced he killed his grandmother, Bernice Forman (Marion Ross), when she dies suddenly in his car after he asks her, "Would it kill you to be nice?" and doesn't know how to deal with it. Red is also at a loss on how to cope with his mother's death, and is embarrassed by his emotional brother Marty (Pat Skipper), who comes to the funeral. Note: This episode takes place in 1976 instead of 1977. In the chronological timeline, this episode takes place shortly before the episode "That '70s Christmas".
24	24	"Hyde Moves In"	David Trainer	Mark Hudis	July 19, 1999	124	7.04
Hyde's mother, Edna, runs off with a trucker, abandoning him. When food and supplies grow dangerously low for Hyde at Edna's rented house, Eric persuades his parents to take Hyde in. Meanwhile, Jackie catches a cold and Kelso is horrified at her ill appearance. Midge uses her home for her feminist meetings, much to Bob's dismay.
25	25	"The Good Son"	David Trainer	Arthur F. Montmorency	July 26, 1999	125	7.58
Eric is annoyed when his parents seem to favor Hyde more than him, and sets about coercing Hyde to do destructive things. Meanwhile, Red's old war buddy, Bull (Mitch Pileggi), returns to Point Place. Red, jealous of Bull's success, reconsiders his life choices, but changes his mind after Bull and his wife (Arlene Pileggi) invite Red and Kitty to a swingers party.
