= Jim Whitaker (filmmaker) =

American filmmaker

Jim Whitaker is an American producer, director, and documentary filmmaker. His producing credits include Take Me Home Tonight (2011), as well as a number of films for Walt Disney Pictures. He was recognized with a Peabody Award as the director and producer of Rebirth, a 2011 documentary following the lives of several participants in the years following the September 11 attacks. The film grew out of the non-profit Project Rebirth, which Whitaker had founded in the aftermath of the attacks.

== Education and early career ==
Whitaker graduated from Georgetown University in 1990 with a Bachelor of Arts in economics. He then attended the USC School of Cinematic Arts, where he earned a Master of Fine Arts from the Peter Stark Producing Program.

He began at Imagine Entertainment in 1993 as a summer intern, where he remained for 16 years before signing a first-look production deal with Disney in 2010. His final position at Imagine was president of production, and he accrued executive producer credits for films including Friday Night Lights, Flightplan, American Gangster, and Robin Hood, the latter two directed by Ridley Scott.

== Project Rebirth and documentary film ==
Between his roles at Imagine and Disney, Whitaker spent a year completing the documentary Rebirth, which he directed and produced. Originally envisioned as a museum installation, Whitaker began filming interviews in 2002, and continued interviewing the five central participants annually until 2009, tracing the effects of the 9/11 attacks on the lives of these survivors over that period. Having accumulated a substantial amount of footage, and amid the then-ongoing redevelopment of Ground Zero, he decided to complete the documentary as a feature, and include time-lapse footage of the redevelopment alongside the interviews. The result has been described as a "time-lapse study in acceptance and healing." Released in 2011, the film earned Whitaker a Peabody Award.

== Walt Disney Pictures ==
Having earlier received mostly executive producer credits for the films in which he was involved, upon moving to Disney in 2010, Whitaker began to develop feature films at the company as a producer. He produced the films The Finest Hours (2016), Pete's Dragon (2016), A Wrinkle in Time (2018), and Peter Pan & Wendy (2023).
