= Man with a Plan (TV series) =

American television sitcom (2016–2020)

- Genre: Sitcom
- Created by: Jackie Filgo Jeff Filgo
- Starring: Matt LeBlanc; Liza Snyder; Jessica Chaffin; Matt Cook; Grace Kaufman; Hala Finley; Matthew McCann; Diana-Maria Riva; Kevin Nealon; Stacy Keach; Kali Rocha
- Composer: John Kimbrough
- Country of origin: United States
- Original language: English
- No. of seasons: 4
- No. of episodes: 69 (list of episodes)

Production
- Executive producers: Jackie Filgo; Jeff Filgo; Matt LeBlanc; James Burrows; Gregg Mettler; Michael Rotenberg; Troy Zien; Mark Gross; Suzy Mamann-Greenberg
- Producers: Tommy Johnagin; Stewart Halpern-Fingerhut; Jamie Lissow
- Camera setup: Multi-camera
- Running time: 22 minutes
- Production companies: Double Double Bonus Entertainment; 3 Arts Entertainment; CBS Television Studios

Original release
- Network: CBS
- Release: October 24, 2016 – June 11, 2020

Man with a Plan is an American television sitcom created by Jackie and Jeff Filgo and starring Matt LeBlanc, who also served as an executive producer. The series ran on CBS from October 24, 2016, to June 11, 2020, airing for 69 episodes over 4 seasons. The series was a staple on CBS's Monday night comedy lineup for its first three seasons, before being moved to Thursday nights for the fourth and final season.

LeBlanc stars as Adam Burns, a contractor raising three children (Grace Kaufman, Matthew McCann, Hala Finley) in suburban Pittsburgh with his wife Andi (Liza Snyder), who decides to go back to work as a medical lab technician in the pilot. Kevin Nealon and Matt Cook co-starred through all four seasons as Adam's brother and friend, respectively. Stacy Keach and Kali Rocha recurred as Adam's father and sister-in-law, respectively, and were upgraded to regular cast members in later seasons. In May 2020, the series was canceled after four seasons.

== Summary ==
When his wife Andi returns to work, old-school father Adam Burns takes on more of the responsibilities of parenting his three rambunctious children (Kate, Teddy and Emme). Adam must learn to balance this challenge with running a contracting business with his elder brother Don, while at the same time dealing with his overbearing father Joe. The series is set in suburban Pittsburgh.

=== Burns family tree ===
Frank
Kelly
Kate

Alice
Andi
Teddy

Joe
Adam Burns
Emme

Beverly
Don Burns	Marcy
Mikey*	Unnamed wife*
Parker

- *Character mentioned but does not appear in an episode.

== Cast ==
Actor	Character	Seasons			
Actor	Character	1	2	3	4
Matt LeBlanc	Adam Burns	Main	Main	Main	Main
Liza Snyder	Andi Burns	Main	Main	Main	Main
Grace Kaufman	Kate Burns	Main	Main	Main	Main
Hala Finley	Emme Burns	Main	Main	Main	Main
Matthew McCann	Teddy Burns	Main	Main	Main	Main
Jessica Chaffin	Marie Faldonado	Main			
Matt Cook	Lowell Franklin	Main	Main	Main	Main
Diana-Maria Riva	Alicia Rodriguez	Main			
Kevin Nealon	Don Burns	Main	Main	Main	Main
Stacy Keach	Joe Burns	Recurring	Main	Main	Main
Kali Rocha	Marcy Burns	Recurring	Recurring	Main	Main

=== Main ===
- Matt LeBlanc as Adam Burns: The patriarch of the Burns household. Along with his brother, Don, he owns Burns Brothers Construction. Adam is the construction expert for the business, with Don handling sales. In season 4, he states that he is 50 years old.
- Liza Snyder as Andi Burns: The matriarch of the Burns household. As the series started, Andi went back to work as a medical lab technician following several years as a stay-at-home mom. At the start of season 3, she has joined Burns Brothers Construction as a designer.
- Grace Kaufman as Kate Burns: The eldest Burns child. At the start of the series, Kate is 13 years old, celebrating her 14th birthday later in the first season. She is the sassy, rebellious child, who is often embarrassed by her parents. She gets her driver's license in the penultimate episode of the series (season 4), suggesting she is at least 16 years old by then. Adam and Andi always punished her and give her a hard time.
- Hala Finley as Emme Burns: The youngest child in the Burns family, who is five years old and beginning kindergarten at the start of the series. Emme is the younger, innocent daughter, who often knows her parents will never let her get away with a lot. She is six years old as of season 2.
- Matthew McCann as Teddy Burns: The middle child in the Burns family, who turns 12 years old during the first season. Teddy is a rather dimwitted child, whose intelligence is often ridiculed by the other characters, including his parents. Adam states that Teddy has his Uncle Don's intelligence.
- Jessica Chaffin as Marie Faldonado (season 1, episodes 1–13): One of Adam's fellow room parents, who is a promiscuous divorcee with children in both Emme and Kate's classes. After episode thirteen, Marie is never seen or mentioned again.
- Matt Cook as Lowell Franklin: The other room parent and the Burnses' friend, who idolizes Adam as his mentor. Lowell is a stay-at-home dad who relies on statistics and experts to help parent his children. In "The Three Amigos", he begins working with Adam and Don as their tech specialist after helping them land a lucrative job with a video presentation he created. Lowell's wife leaves him in season 3.
- Diana-Maria Riva as Alicia Rodriguez (season 1): Emme's kindergarten teacher who is a thorn in Adam's side.
- Kevin Nealon as Don Burns: Adam's older brother, who co-owns Burns Brothers Construction alongside Adam. It is mentioned in "The Three Amigos" that Don handles sales for the business. He is very dim-witted like his nephew Teddy. He is married to Marcy, and together they have a son, Mikey, who is an ex-convict living in a studio apartment.
- Stacy Keach as Joe Burns (seasons 2–4; recurring season 1): Adam and Don's father, who moved his motor home into Adam and Andi's driveway. Adam frequently accuses Joe of favoring Don, but Joe insists it's only because Don has always needed more coddling than Adam.
- Kali Rocha as Marcy Burns (seasons 3–4; recurring seasons 1–2): Don's wife and Andi's best friend. She has a hostile relationship with her mother-in-law Beverly, who doesn't think Marcy is ever good enough for her son.

=== Recurring ===
- Swoosie Kurtz as Beverly Burns, Adam and Don's mother and Joe's wife who heavily scrutinizes her daughters-in-law. While she becomes somewhat friendly toward Andi, she never warms up to Marcy.
- Christine Woods as Lisa McCaffrey, Adam and Don's client on a mall construction project (seasons 1–2)
- Sherri Shepherd as Joy, the Burnses' neighbor who is also the building inspector on Adam's job site (season 2)
- Tim Meadows as Rudy, the Burnses' neighbor and Joy's husband (season 2)
- Ron Funches as Funchy, Joe's home care nurse and friend (season 3)
- Jessica St. Clair as Kelly, Andi's sister (season 3)

== Episodes ==
Season	Episodes	Originally released	
Season	Episodes	First released	Last released
1	22	October 24, 2016	May 15, 2017
2	21	November 13, 2017	May 21, 2018
3	13	February 4, 2019	May 6, 2019
4	13	April 2, 2020	June 11, 2020

== Production ==
=== Development ===
On February 3, 2016, the production officially received a pilot order and James Burrows would direct the pilot. The pilot was written by Jackie and Jeff Filgo who was also set to executive produce with Michael Rotenberg and Troy Zien. Production companies involved with the pilot include Double Double Bonus Entertainment, CBS Television Studios, and 3 Arts Entertainment. On May 12, 2016, it was announced that CBS had given the production, now titled Man with a Plan, a series order. A day after that, it was announced that the series would premiere on October 24, 2016, by Monday at 8:30pm. On November 14, 2016, CBS picked up the series for a full season of 19 episodes. On January 6, 2017, CBS ordered three additional episodes, increasing the first season order to 22. On March 23, 2017, CBS renewed the series for a second season, which premiered on November 13, 2017. On November 27, 2017, CBS ordered eight additional episodes for the second season, bringing the total to 21 episodes. On May 12, 2018, CBS renewed the series for a third season which premiered on February 4, 2019. On May 10, 2019, the series was renewed for a fourth season, which premiered on April 2, 2020. CBS cancelled the series in May 2020.

=== Casting ===
Casting for the main cast started in February 2016 with Matt LeBlanc and ended the next month with Matt Cook and Grace Kaufman. On May 13, 2016, it was reported that Jenna Fischer, who was originally cast to play the female lead opposite LeBlanc in the series, had exited and her role would be recast. In 2021, Fischer asserted on the Office Ladies podcast that her role had been recast because test audiences didn't "believe Pam would marry Joey", referring to Fischer and LeBlanc's respective roles on The Office and Friends.

On August 1, it was announced Liza Snyder would replace Fischer as the female lead. On August 2, 2016, it was reported that Kevin Nealon had joined the cast in a main role. On September 4, 2018, it was announced that Kali Rocha was promoted to series regular for season 3.

=== Filming ===
Man with a Plan was filmed at Radford Studio Center in Studio City, Los Angeles, but it's set in Pittsburgh, Pennsylvania.

=== Cancellation ===
On May 6, 2020, CBS announced that Man with a Plan had been cancelled after four seasons. While ratings for the fourth season were satisfactory, the network was reportedly looking to lower costs following the merger of CBS and Viacom that had taken place that same season. The series was expensive to produce for the network, which was a major factor in its decision to cancel the series. The series concluded on June 11, 2020, following a 69-episode run.

== Reception ==
=== Critical response ===
Man with a Plan received negative reviews from critics. On the review aggregator Rotten Tomatoes, the series has an approval rating of 21%, based on 29 reviews, with an average rating of 3.29/10. The site's critical consensus reads, "Man with a Plan's flawed, unimaginative writing fails to properly showcase the charm of its unfortunately underperforming lead." On Metacritic, which assigns a normalized rating, the series has a score 36 out of 100, based on 25 critics, indicating "generally unfavorable reviews".

=== Ratings ===
Viewership and ratings per season of Man with a Plan
Season	Timeslot (ET)	Episodes	First aired		Last aired		TV season	Viewership rank	Avg. viewers (millions)	Avg. 18–49 rating
Season	Timeslot (ET)	Episodes	Date	Viewers (millions)	Date	Viewers (millions)	TV season	Viewership rank	Avg. viewers (millions)	Avg. 18–49 rating
1	Monday 8:30 pm	22	October 24, 2016	7.42	May 15, 2017	5.73	2016–17	47	7.41	1.5
2	Monday 8:30 pm	21	November 13, 2017	5.38	May 21, 2018	5.69	2017–18	61	6.78	1.2
3	Monday 8:30 pm	13	February 4, 2019	6.17	May 6, 2019	4.87	2018–19	67	6.35	1.1
4	Thursday 8:30 pm	13	April 2, 2020	7.01	June 11, 2020	5.03	2019–20	45	7.37	1.0

=== Accolades ===
Year	Award	Category	Recipient(s)	Result	Ref.
2017	People's Choice Awards	Favorite Actor In A New TV Series	Matt LeBlanc	Won	
2017	People's Choice Awards	Favorite New TV Comedy	Man with a Plan	Won	

== International versions ==
Country/language	Local title	Channel	Date aired/premiered	End date
Ukraine	Батько рулить / Father rules	TET	October 26, 2020	

== Home media ==
The first season was released in Region 1, via Amazon's Manufacture on Demand (MOD) service, on November 16, 2018. The second season was released on July 8, 2019. The third season was released on September 22, 2020. The fourth and final season was released on November 26, 2020.

Season	No. of episodes	DVD Release dates		
Season	No. of episodes	Region 1	Region 2	Region 4
1	22	November 16, 2018	TBA	TBA
2	21	July 8, 2019	TBA	TBA
3	13	September 22, 2020	TBA	TBA
4	13	November 26, 2020	TBA	TBA

== See also ==
- Kevin Can Wait, another CBS sitcom often compared and partnered with Man with a Plan
