= Project Rebirth =

American non-profit organization

Project Rebirth, Inc. is a U.S. 501(c)(3) non-profit organization created to support victims and early responders to catastrophic events through documentary footage recording the rebuilding at the site of World Trade Center following the September 11 attacks and seven years in the lives of people directly affected by the event. It also intends to create a Project Rebirth Center to help educate responders and the public about dealing with such events. The organization was created in honor of the victims of the September 11 attacks and those who responded to the attacks. Founded by producer Jim Whitaker, the organization is supported by dozens of corporate donors, including Aon Foundation, OppenheimerFunds Inc., and Lower Manhattan Development Corporation. All profits from its documentary film Rebirth, officially released in January 2011, go to the support of the Project Rebirth Center.

== History ==
Project Rebirth was inspired by Jim Whitaker's visit to Ground Zero with his wife. He told Huffington Post in 2011 that in the midst of his despair over the devastation, a glimmer of hope came to him when he realized that the site would not always look the way it did then. Wanting to convey those shifting emotions, he decided first to set up time-lapse cameras at the site to track its evolution, but gradually realized that telling the stories of the people involved was also important. Filming at the site began in March 2002. It was while showing the early edited footage to others that Whitaker's vision began to expand, and he realized that the film could have educational value in helping people learn from grief. From this realization, the idea of the Project Rebirth Center was developed. Filming lasted for eight years; the overall cost of making the documentary that resulted was $9.5 million. The filming resulted in 900 hours of tape; while less than a quarter percent of this went into the final film, the footage is being made available to agencies dedicated to dealing with such events, including mental health agencies, law enforcement and firefighters.

== Rebirth ==
On January 23, 2011, Project Rebirth released the documentary Rebirth at the Sundance Film Festival. Originally, Whitaker, who directed, had intended to focus on the site solely, with a film to be included in a future museum, but told Filmmaker magazine in 2011 that his time at Ground Zero convinced him that the stories of the people needed to be told as well to "capture the human dimension of the event." Although nine people were followed, the finished film focuses on the lives of five individuals: a teenager, Nick, whose mother died; a firefighter, Tim, who lost colleagues; a woman, Tanya, who lost her fiancé; a woman, Ling, who has undergone over 40 surgeries to help deal with the devastation of the attack; and a construction worker, Brian, who is helping to rebuild. Early reception of the documentary was positive, with Sundance audiences responding with a standing ovation and film critic Kirk Honeycutt stating that "Every choice Whitaker has made, from his decision not to show any of the footage from that terrible day to whatever methods he used to get his heroes to express themselves so candidly, pays off beautifully. The word "inspiring" gets overused but 'Rebirth' is really and truly inspiring." All profits from the documentary are to help fund the Project Rebirth Center.

The documentary received a Peabody Award in 2011.
