= That '70s Show =

American television sitcom (1998–2006)

- Genre: Teen sitcom
- Created by: Bonnie and Terry Turner; Mark Brazill
- Directed by: David Trainer; Terry Hughes (Pilot)
- Starring: Topher Grace; Mila Kunis; Ashton Kutcher; Danny Masterson; Laura Prepon; Wilmer Valderrama; Debra Jo Rupp; Kurtwood Smith; Tanya Roberts; Don Stark; Lisa Robin Kelly; Tommy Chong; Josh Meyers
- Theme music composer: Alex Chilton; Chris Bell
- Opening theme: "That '70s Song" by; Todd Griffin (season 1); Cheap Trick (seasons 2–8)
- Composer: Ben Vaughn
- Country of origin: United States
- Original language: English
- No. of seasons: 8
- No. of episodes: 200 (list of episodes)

Production
- Executive producers: Bonnie Turner (1998–2004); Terry Turner (1998–2004); Mark Brazill (1998–2004); Marcy Carsey; Tom Werner; Caryn Mandabach (1998–2004); Joshua Sternin (1999–2001); Jennifer Ventimilia (1999–2001); Linda Wallem (1999–2001); Jackie Filgo (2002–2005); Jeff Filgo (2002–2005); Rob DesHotel (2005–2006); Mark Hudis (2005–2006); Dean Batali (2005–2006)
- Cinematography: Ronald W. Browne
- Editors: Timothy Ryder; David Helfand; Michael Karlich
- Running time: 22 minutes
- Production company: The Carsey-Werner Company

Original release
- Network: Fox
- Release: August 23, 1998 – May 18, 2006

Related
- Days Like These; That '80s Show; That '90s Show

That '70s Show is an American television teen sitcom that aired on Fox from August 23, 1998, to May 18, 2006. The series focuses on the lives of a group of six teenage friends living in the fictional town of Point Place, Wisconsin, from 1976 to 1979. The ensemble cast features Topher Grace, Mila Kunis, Ashton Kutcher, Danny Masterson, Laura Prepon, Wilmer Valderrama, Lisa Robin Kelly, Debra Jo Rupp, Kurtwood Smith, Don Stark, Tommy Chong, and Tanya Roberts.

In 1999, the show was remade for the ITV network in the United Kingdom as Days Like These using almost verbatim scripts with minor changes to cultural references. A sequel series, That '90s Show, set in 1995 and focusing on the children of the main characters of the original show, was released on Netflix from 2023 to 2024.

== Premise ==
The Circle illustrated the teens' marijuana use, usually in Eric's basement. The image is of the final scene of the series.

=== Setting and timeline ===
The show was set in May 1976 in the August 23, 1998 premiere. After 12 episodes, the series transitioned to 1977. The 23rd episode, "Grandma's Dead", was also set in 1976, because it was the 12th episode that was produced, and was originally going to air earlier in the debut season. The show remained in 1977 for the next two seasons. Near the end of the third season, the series transitioned to 1978 until early in the sixth season. The remaining episodes took place in 1979, and the series finale abruptly ends during a New Year's Eve party as the characters reach "one" during a countdown to January 1, 1980. After the credits roll, the license plate from Eric's Vista Cruiser is shown with the year "80", indicating that the 1980s have begun.

The series has gained some notoriety due to perceived continuity errors present in its timeline. Although it is implied that one year passes in congruence with each season of the series, the characters remain of high school age from the beginning of the series until the conclusion of season five. Additionally, characters can be seen listening to albums that would have not yet been released at the time of the episode's setting.

=== Themes and references ===
The show is a 1970s nostalgia sitcom. The show addressed numerous social issues of the 1970s such as sexual attitudes of the era, generational conflict, the economic hardships of the 1970s recession, mistrust of the American government by blue-collar workers, and underage drinking/drug use. The series also highlighted developments in fashion trends, the entertainment industry, including the television remote ("the clicker"), reruns, VCRs, and cable TV; the video games Pong and Space Invaders; the cassette tape and Disco; MAD magazine; and Eric's obsession with Star Wars, which came out in 1977. The show has been compared to Happy Days, which was similarly set 20 years before the time in which it aired. Many of the show's episodes featured Eric and the rest of the kids in or around Eric's "Aztec Gold" 1969 Oldsmobile Vista Cruiser, handed down to Eric by Red in the pilot episode (after Red begrudgingly buys a 1976 Toyota Corolla, a more economical car).

With the show being based in Point Place, Wisconsin (a fictional suburb of Green Bay), the Green Bay Packers were often featured through the use of jerseys, a Packers helmet, and other paraphernalia. A Season 7 episode called "Street Fighting Man" highlighted the fanhood of many of the characters, as the gang attends a Packers' game at Lambeau Field. During the series finale, Red receives season tickets to the Packers as a gift from Hyde.

The series also contains references to the popular music of the 1970s, such as Led Zeppelin, Pink Floyd, Lynyrd Skynyrd, Alice Cooper, Aerosmith, Ted Nugent, Kiss, The Grateful Dead, ABBA and The Steve Miller Band. Additionally, the series featured cameos from prominent rock musicians such as Nugent himself, as well as Roger Daltrey of the Who.

=== Running gags and catchphrases ===
In one of the show's major running gags, Red often threatens to punish Eric with many variations of the catchphrase, "my foot in your ass" or more generally "kicking your ass."

Some other notable running gags and catchphrases are:

- Fez's country of origin is never revealed. Sometimes, Fez is about to disclose where he is from, or at least hint at it, but something happens to prevent him from doing so, like someone entering the room as seen in "Stolen Car", or Fez rambling in "Love of My Life".
- Fez's real name was also never revealed. Even Fez stood for FES, Foreign Exchange Student. Red often calls Fez by some exotic foreign names when he is speaking directly to him, including Tarzan.
- Someone, usually Kelso, falls off the Water Tower. Charlie is the only one to fall off and die from the tower in "Bohemian Rhapsody" due to him having weak endurance.
- Kelso yells "Ow, my eye!" when Hyde rough-houses with him. For example, in the episode "Class Picture", a series of flashbacks feature Hyde beating up Kelso. While the two are out of the immediate sight of the audience, Kelso yells, "Ow, my eye!" and the scene cuts to the next flashback. This gag is repeated several times throughout the series, although the only time Kelso appears with an injured eye is in "Jackie's Cheese Squeeze" after he was punched by Todd, Jackie's manager. On that occasion, Kelso did not yell, "Ow, my eye!" On certain occasions, other characters have done this gag. On one occasion, Jackie got into a fight with Laurie and tackled her over the couch where Laurie shouted "Ow, my eye!"
- Fez's sex life or usually lack thereof. Often Fez accidentally reveals some perverse behavior he performed, like hiding in Donna's room.
- The best thing to do or the best solution can be found by "The Circle", sometimes from the Circle, Hyde will start to talk about a car that runs on water or conspiracies towards the Government.
- Eric's attempted "secret" money stash locations are known by everyone, such as the Candy Land box.
- Characters (usually Kelso) being made to wear a Green Bay Packers helmet following an especially ignorant comment.

== Format ==
That '70s Show featured a multi-camera setup and was filmed before a live studio audience with canned laughter. In "The Circle," a group of characters, usually the teenagers, sit in a circle (generally in Eric's basement, though occasionally elsewhere), as the camera pans, stopping at each character as they speak. It was usually apparent that the characters are under the influence of marijuana. Thick clouds of smoke, frequent coughing and an extreme wide-angle lens added to the "drug-induced" feel, although the audience never saw anyone actually smoking the drug. Also, no visible drug-related paraphernalia were seen, such as bongs or rolling papers. Characters never spoke the word "marijuana" while in The Circle (except in one episode, "Reefer Madness"), often referring to it as "stuff" or a "stash". In the episode "Bye-Bye Basement", Theo (Leo's cousin) refers to "weed"; in "The Relapse", Kelso tells Fez that the concrete wall behind the gym is used mostly for "smoking weed and beating up freshmen;" in "Ski Trip" Kitty asks Eric why he is taking so much oregano to Jackie's ski lodge; in "Eric's Burger Job", Kelso blames his "roach clip" when the water bed on which he is sitting at a party deflates; in two episodes ("That Wrestling Show" and "Hyde Moves In"), Eric and Hyde can be seen wearing shirts with the words "Cannabis sativa" written on a Campbell's soup can; and in "The Pill", Red, referring to Kelso, exclaims, "That kid's on dope!" A gimmick related to the circle and the marijuana smoking was Eric watching the kitchen wall moving erratically, although this technique was also used to show that Eric was drunk.

As the series progressed, The Circle became one of the series' recurring features. The only four episodes where the whole gang is in The Circle are "Class Picture", "I'm A Boy", "Substitute", and in the series finale. During the eighth and final season, The Circle (sans the smoke) replaced the Formans' Vista Cruiser as the setting of the opening credits.

Beginning with season 5, each episode in the series is named after a song by a rock band that was famous in the 1970s: Led Zeppelin (season 5), The Who (season 6), The Rolling Stones (season 7), and Queen (season 8, except for the finale, titled "That '70s Finale").

For the first seven seasons of the show, the show's introduction showed the cast inside the Vista Cruiser. The particular station wagon was ultimately bought by Wilmer Valderrama at the show's conclusion from Carsey-Werner for "no more than" $500.

== Production ==
The working titles for the show were:

- Teenage Wasteland (named after the lyric from "Baba O'Riley" by The Who)
- The Kids Are Alright (named after "The Kids Are Alright" by The Who)
- Feelin' All Right (a Traffic & Joe Cocker song)
- Reeling in the Years (named after the song by Steely Dan)

Requests to use the titles of songs by The Who were rejected, and though Feelin' All Right was used as the title of the show during its upfront presentation, Fox later decided it would not be memorable enough. Bonnie Turner proposed simply calling it That '70s Show, predicting that audiences would merely refer to it by its setting anyway.

Mila Kunis lied about her age to get her role as Jackie Burkhart in the series. She was 14 years old, though the show required its actors to be 18.

Eric Forman was written out of the series at the end of the seventh season, as Topher Grace wanted to move on with his career. Ashton Kutcher switched to a recurring guest role when he also chose to depart following the seventh season. However, Kelso had not been written out yet, so to give better closure to the character, Kutcher appeared in the first four episodes of the eighth season (credited as a special guest star). Wilmer Valderrama recalled: "When they made the decision — which was completely, 100 percent fine, because after eight years I think it's OK to say you want out — we looked at it and said, 'Do we still have a show?' And it's such an amazing ensemble. Every single one of us has our character down, so we knew there were a lot of lines to explore."

Both Grace and Kutcher returned for the series finale, although the former was uncredited. Tommy Chong (who began reappearing by late season 7 after a long absence) became a regular again to help fill Kelso's role as the dimwit of the group. Eric was supposed to be replaced by his new friend Charlie, played by Bret Harrison, as an "innocent character", who proved fairly popular with audiences, but the character was killed off after Harrison was offered a lead role in the series The Loop.

Another new character named Randy Pearson, played by Josh Meyers (brother of Late Night host Seth Meyers), was introduced to take the place of both Eric and, to a lesser extent, Charlie. Another new character, Samantha, a stripper played by Jud Tylor, was added as Hyde's wife for nine episodes. The location of the show's introductory theme song was changed from the Vista Cruiser to the circle.

The eighth season was announced as the final season of the show on January 17, 2006, and "That '70s Finale" was filmed a month later on February 17, 2006, first airing on May 18, 2006.

== Cast ==
- Topher Grace as Eric Forman (seasons 1–7; uncredited guest season 8): The leader and straight man of the group, Eric is a nice person, quite slender and somewhat clumsy. He has a fast wit and a deadpan sense of humor. His obsession with movies, particularly Star Wars, is often referred to throughout the show. For seven seasons Eric is in a relationship with his longtime love and neighbor Donna Pinciotti. His father, Red, is frequently hard on him and casually insults him. He convinces his parents to let his best friend Steven Hyde move in with them, making Hyde like a brother. He decides to become a teacher after high school and he leaves the series at the end of the seventh season to teach in Africa. Although Eric is mentioned at least once in every episode, he does not appear during the final season until the end of the series finale.
- Mila Kunis as Jacqueline "Jackie" Beulah Burkhart: The youngest member of the group, Jackie starts the series as the pretty, spoiled rich, selfish, oftentimes annoying immature girl. She likes to give thoughtless and superficial advice, which occasionally turns out to be correct. As the series progresses she becomes more genuine, after her father, a crooked politician, goes to jail and her fortunes take a reversal. Partly as a result of these changes, she and Donna become better friends. By the end of the series, Jackie had dated three of the four guys of the group: Kelso, Hyde and Fez.
- Ashton Kutcher as Michael Kelso (seasons 1–7; special guest season 8): Kelso is the dumb pretty boy of the group, who hopes to coast through life on his good looks. He spends the first half of the series in a relationship with the equally vapid Jackie. Their relationship comes to an end when Laurie (Eric's older sister) reveals their affair to Jackie. Kelso fathers a daughter, named Betsy, from his relationship with a librarian named Brooke during the seventh season. He becomes a police officer, but is fired for utter incompetence. In the fourth episode of the eighth and final season, he becomes a security guard at the Chicago Playboy Club and leaves the show. Kelso, along with Eric, returns for the series finale.
- Danny Masterson as Steven Hyde: Eric's best friend and the anti-establishment member of the group. By the end of season one, the Formans allow Hyde to move in after he was abandoned by his mother, making him a foster brother to Eric. Hyde has a witty, blunt and sarcastic sense of humor and a rebellious personality. He is also experienced and the other group members often ask for his advice. Although Hyde dates Jackie for three seasons, in the final season he marries an exotic dancer named Samantha. Hyde later discovers Samantha was married to another man when she married him. As Donna points out in "My Fairy King", that means Hyde and Samantha are not legally married. In the seventh season, Hyde meets his biological father (William Barnett, played by Tim Reid), a wealthy black businessman (making Hyde, who was presumed white, biracial). Barnett, who owns a chain of record stores, makes Hyde first an office worker, then a manager and later the owner of the Point Place record store. He also previously worked for Leo in a Photo Hut earlier in the series.
- Laura Prepon as Donna Pinciotti: Eric's longtime girlfriend (and briefly fiancée) who is literally and figuratively "the girl next door". Donna is tall, intelligent, good-looking and athletic. Donna is embarrassed by her parents' escapades—especially sexual ones. Although she does not agree with what Jackie represents in the beginning of the series, they become friends. Donna is in a relationship with Eric for seven seasons (despite their break-up during season 4). She has brief romances with Randy and Kelso's brother Casey. She rekindles her relationship with Eric at the end of the show's finale.
- Wilmer Valderrama as Fez: The horny foreign exchange student of the group whose hormones are usually out of control. He constantly flirts with Jackie and Donna and often makes romantic advances toward them. Initially, he has trouble getting attention from girls, but during the eighth season he becomes much more charismatic and promiscuous. He is in love with Jackie throughout the series but his love is not reciprocated until the eighth season when they become a couple. His home country is often referenced throughout the course of the show, but is never named specifically. His name is also never given; Fez is simply the pronunciation of F.E.S. (Foreign Exchange Student).
- Josh Meyers as Randy Pearson (season 8): Hyde's employee at the record store. He is introduced in the final season. Randy appears laid back, gentle, polite and a ladies' man, although many of his flaws surface later, encompassing parts of the departed Kelso and Eric's personalities and other attributes. Tall (like Kelso), he tends to spout witty one-liners (like Eric), and makes silly voices. He forms a friendship with Red after showing Red how good he is at fixing things. While Hyde, Jackie, Donna and Kelso embrace him as a new member of their group, Fez initially does not, but soon warms up to him. Randy dates Donna for the majority of season eight, but she later breaks up with him. The two end on good terms and remain friends. He makes a brief appearance in the series finale.
- Debra Jo Rupp as Kitty Forman: Red's wife, mother of Eric and Laurie, and Hyde's informally adoptive mother, Kitty is a cheerful, doting mother, but can also be assertive when pushed. A nurse by profession, she drinks heavily and is a former smoker. Her major mood swings are usually attributed to menopause, although the lack of affection and attention from her daughter (Laurie) and her mother (Bea) is also partly to blame. She is also a nurturing mother figure to Eric's rather dysfunctional friends, especially Fez.
- Kurtwood Smith as Red Forman: Kitty's husband, father of Eric and Laurie, and Hyde's adoptive father. Red is a conservative Navy combat veteran who served during both World War II and the Korean War. He is frequently hard on Eric and casually insults him, often calling him "dumbass", and finding ways to cheat Eric and his friends (especially Kelso) out of any cash they have. Despite his mean exterior, Red also displays a soft side. His hobbies include working with his power tools, drinking beer, watching television, reading the newspaper, hunting and fishing.
- Lisa Robin Kelly (seasons 2–3; recurring season 1; special appearance season 5) and Christina Moore (recurring season 6) as Laurie Forman: Eric's manipulative and dishonest older sister. She flunked out of college during the first season and moves back home with her parents. Laurie enjoys tormenting Eric and manipulating her parents. She is promiscuous, often seen with various men, mainly Eric's friend Kelso, who cheats on his girlfriend Jackie, which eventually leads to Jackie physically assaulting Laurie. Eric, Hyde, and Donna often insult her for her promiscuity. She also has a strained relationship with her mother who thinks of her as a freeloader. She leaves the series during the third season, but returns in a recurring role during the fifth and sixth seasons. In season five, she marries Fez to prevent him from getting deported. She leaves the series part way through season 6 and is never seen again. During the seventh season, she is mentioned as having moved to Canada, where, as Eric puts it drolly, "bottomless dancing is legal".
- Tanya Roberts as Midge Pinciotti (seasons 1–3; special guest appearance seasons 6–7): Bob's wife, Donna's mother, and Kitty's best friend, Midge is a woman about whom Eric and his male friends fantasize when coming of age. Although often dim-witted, she later adopts some feminist ideals. She is written out of the series in 2001 after the third season after divorcing Bob and moving to California, but returns in a limited guest appearance during the sixth and seventh seasons.
- Don Stark as Bob Pinciotti: Midge's husband and Donna's father. Bob often brags about his service in the National Guard, which invariably irritates Red, a veteran of two wars. Bob is known for walking around his house with his robe wide open and no underwear. He eats constantly, even in bed. Bob is almost always in a good mood. His best friend is Red, who usually considers him to be a nuisance. He usually takes the brunt of Red's abuse in a jolly manner. After Midge divorces Bob in the fourth season, he begins dating Joanne (in seasons four and five) and Pam Burkhart (played by Brooke Shields replacing Eve Plumb from the first season), Jackie's mother (in seasons six and seven).
- Tommy Chong as Leo (seasons 4 & 8; special guest seasons 2–3 & 7): A hippie, and the owner of a Foto Hut at which Hyde once worked, Leo is an Army veteran who served in World War II, where he was awarded a Purple Heart. Leo often puts play before work and maintains an easy-going attitude in most things, business included. He disappears during season four, but is later referenced in season five's "The Battle of Evermore" when the gang goes on a mission to find him, but with no luck. He returns in season seven and remains on the series until the show's end. In Season 8, he gets a new job working for Hyde at Grooves.

== Episodes ==
Season	Episodes	Originally released	
Season	Episodes	First released	Last released
1	25	August 23, 1998	July 26, 1999
2	26	September 28, 1999	May 22, 2000
3	25	October 3, 2000	May 22, 2001
4	27	September 25, 2001	May 21, 2002
5	25	September 17, 2002	May 14, 2003
6	25	October 29, 2003	May 19, 2004
7	25	September 8, 2004	May 18, 2005
8	22	November 2, 2005	May 18, 2006

== In other media ==
=== Home media and streaming ===
That '70s Show was released on DVD in Regions 1, 2 and 4 by 20th Century Fox Home Entertainment at an increment of two seasons per year between 2004 and 2008 and a complete series release on October 14, 2008. Mill Creek Entertainment released all eight seasons between 2011–2013 and released a complete series set on May 14, 2013.

On March 6, 2012, Mill Creek released the first season on Blu-ray and season two on October 16, 2012. On November 3, 2015, Mill Creek Entertainment released That '70s Show The Complete Series on Blu-ray 1080p, featuring all 200 episodes from the series, presented digitally remastered in High Definition from the original film negatives for optimum sound and video quality and for superior home entertainment Blu-ray presentation with remastered 5.1 DTS-HD Master Audio surround sound and 16:9 widescreen aspect ratio.

In 2019, Rupert Murdoch sold most of 21st Century Fox's film and television assets to Disney, but That '70s Show was not included as part of the sale, as the show's underlying rights were with production company Carsey-Werner. That same year, a sublicensing deal for the show with streamer Netflix ended in the United States, with the deal ending globally in 2020. In 2022, Carsey-Werner sublicensed it to NBCUniversal's streaming service Peacock.

=== Soundtracks ===
Several prominent songs from the decade can be heard on the series, and two soundtracks were released in 1999. The first is a collection of funk, soul, and disco, called That '70s Album (Jammin'). The second is a collection of album-oriented rock songs, called That '70s Album (Rockin'). AllMusic gave both albums 3 out of 5 stars in their reviews.

== Related shows ==
=== That '90s Show ===
Netflix produced a spin-off of the series, titled That '90s Show, with Kurtwood Smith and Debra Jo Rupp reprising their roles as Red and Kitty Forman, respectively. It premiered on Netflix on January 19, 2023 and ran for two seasons before being cancelled in October 2024. Like the original series, it was again produced by The Carsey-Werner Company, with Gregg Mettler serving as showrunner and Bonnie Turner, Terry Turner, their daughter Lindsay Turner, Marcy Carsey, Tom Werner, Smith and Rupp as executive producers. Topher Grace (Eric Forman), Mila Kunis (Jackie Burkhart), Ashton Kutcher (Michael Kelso), Laura Prepon (Donna Pinciotti), Wilmer Valderrama (Fez), Tommy Chong (Leo), Don Stark (Bob Pinciotti), Jim Rash (Fenton) and Seth Green (Mitch Miller), reprised their roles as guest stars in the series.

== Reception ==
=== American ratings ===
That '70s Show's eight seasons, consisting of 200 episodes, made it Fox's second-longest-running live-action sitcom ever behind Married... with Children, though it did not have the same ratings success, despite surviving cancellation.

Season		Episodes	Timeslot	Premiere	Season finale	Rank	Viewers (in millions)
1	1998–1999	25	Sunday 8:30 PM (1998–1999); Monday 8:00 PM (1999)	August 23, 1998	July 26, 1999		11.7
2	1999–2000	26	Tuesday 8:30 PM (1999–2000); Tuesday 8:00 PM (2000); Monday 8:00 PM (2000)	September 28, 1999	May 22, 2000	86	9.0
3	2000–2001	25	Tuesday 8:00 PM	October 3, 2000	May 22, 2001		10.8
4	2001–2002	27	Tuesday 8:00 PM	September 25, 2001	May 21, 2002	67	9.1
5	2002–2003	25	Tuesday 8:00 PM (2002); Wednesday 8:00 PM (2003)	September 17, 2002	May 14, 2003	52	10.4
6	2003–2004	25	Wednesday 8:00 PM	October 29, 2003	May 19, 2004	49	10.0
7	2004–2005	25	Wednesday 8:00 PM	September 8, 2004	May 18, 2005	85	7.0
8	2005–2006	22	Wednesday 8:00 PM (2005); Thursday 8:00 PM (2006)	November 2, 2005	May 18, 2006	103	5.8

=== Awards ===
Over the course of its run, the series was nominated for a substantial number of awards, including 16 Primetime Emmy Awards. The only win for the series at this event came in 1999, when Melina Root was awarded the Emmy for Outstanding Costume Design for a Series for "That Disco Episode". Additionally, the show was nominated for a large number of Teen Choice Awards, with both Ashton Kutcher and Wilmer Valderrama winning on three occasions.

== Legacy ==
In August 2009, the show's Vista Cruiser was named third-greatest television car ever by MSN Autos.
