= John Bowman (screenwriter) =

American television writer and producer (1957–2021)

- Born: September 28, 1957; Milwaukee, Wisconsin, U.S.
- Died: December 28, 2021 (aged 64); Santa Monica, California, U.S.
- Occupations: Television writer and producer

John Frederick Bowman (September 28, 1957 – December 28, 2021) was an American television writer and producer best known for co-creating the Fox sitcom Martin. He wrote for Saturday Night Live, The Show, and In Living Color. He also worked as the showrunner of Murphy Brown. Bowman won a Primetime Emmy Award for Saturday Night Live in 1989. He was nominated for two more, for In Living Color, in 1991 and 1992.

== Early life and career ==
Bowman was born on September 28, 1957, in Milwaukee, Wisconsin. He attended Whitefish Bay High School. While attending Harvard College, he was an editor of The Harvard Lampoon. After graduating from Harvard Business School in 1985, he worked as a junior executive at PepsiCo. In 1988, he and his wife, Shannon Gaughan, were hired as staff writers on Saturday Night Live.

Bowman served as head of the Writers Guild of America negotiating committee during the 2007–08 writers' strike. He later taught comedy writing at the USC School of Cinematic Arts.

== Personal life and death ==
Bowman married Shannon Gaughan in 1982. They met while working on The Harvard Lampoon. They had five children.

He died from dilated cardiomyopathy on December 28, 2021, at his home in Santa Monica, California, at the age of 64.
