= Jackie and Jeff Filgo =

American screenwriter

Jackie Filgo and Jeff Filgo are a married screenwriting and television writing team.

== Career ==
Jeff and Jackie Filgo met while working on the production staff of Mad About You.

In television, their credits include Ink, the US adaptation of Men Behaving Badly, That '70s Show, Happy Hour (also creators), The New Adventures of Old Christine, Hank, and Man with a Plan (also creators).

In film, they co-wrote the screenplay for Diary of a Wimpy Kid (2010) and wrote the screenplay for Take Me Home Tonight (2011), starring Topher Grace, who they previously worked with on That '70s Show.

== Personal life ==
They live in Los Angeles with their two children.

== Filmography ==
=== Film ===
Year	Title	Contribution	Notes
2010	Diary of a Wimpy Kid	Screenplay	
2011	Take Me Home Tonight	Screenplay	

=== Television ===
Year	Title	Writer	Producer	Executive producer	Notes	Network
1997	Ink	Yes	No	Yes		CBS
1997	Men Behaving Badly	Yes	No	No		NBC
1998–2005	That 70's Show	Yes	Yes	Yes	Executive Producers of 177 episodes Producers of 2 episodes Writers of 16 episodes	Fox
2006–2008	Happy Hour	Yes	No	Yes	Creator/Executive Producers of 14 episodes Writers of 4 episodes	Fox
2009–2010	The New Adventures of Old Christine	Yes	No	No	Writers of 2 episodes	CBS
2009–2010	Hank	Yes	No	No	Consulting Producers of 5 episodes Writers of 2 episodes	Fox
2016–2020	Man with a Plan	Yes	Yes	Yes	Creator/Executive Producers of 46 episodes Writers of 7 episodes	CBS

=== Animation ===
Year	Title	Contribution	Notes
2000	Baby Blues	Writer	Writer of 1 episodes (as Jackie Behan)
