= The Frankenstein Brothers =

A Beer Tale
- Directed by: Lee Roy Kunz
- Written by: Lee Roy Kunz; Kane Kunz
- Produced by: Maria Kunz; Isaac Bauman; Cru Ennis; Lee Roy Kunz
- Starring: Zelda Williams; Taryn Southern; Alexandra Paul
- Cinematography: Isaac Bauman
- Edited by: Lee Roy Kunz
- Music by: Filligar; Stevie Starlight
- Production company: Frankenstein Brothers LLC
- Release date: April 7, 2010 (Beverly Hills)
- Country: United States
- Language: English

The Frankenstein Brothers is a 2010 independent romantic comedy that takes place in Longmont, Colorado. The plot is centered on two orphan brothers, recently graduated from college, who inherit the Left Hand Brewing Company.

== Plot ==
The Frankenstein Brothers is a coming of age romantic comedy centered on the lives of twin brothers Luke and Corey Frankenstein in the months following college graduation. Orphaned at the age of five, the brothers inherited their family brewery—the real-life Left Hand Brewing Company—and were left in the care of their uncle, a well-meaning but less than ideal paternal figure.

When Luke meets a girl who introduces him to her warm, inviting family members, he turns away from Corey to focus on this budding romance. Corey, however, refuses to go down without a fight, and the ensuing mayhem that follows pits brother against brother and forces the Colorado wild boys to finally grow up and decide what kind of men they really want to be.

== Cast ==
- Cru Ennis as Luke Frankenstein
  - Bryan Suchey as Young Luke Frankenstein
- Lee Roy Kunz as Corey Frankenstein
- Boris Lee Krutonog as Mr. Volkov
- Brandon Henry as Ryan
- Lee Kunz as Connor Frankenstein
- Nicole Kunz as Annie Martinson
- Ellen Lawson as Grandma
- Todd Leigh as Derek
- Kaiwi Lyman as Kai
- Scott Patterson as George Martinson
- Alexandra Paul as Laurie Martinson
- Keith Pratt as Misha
- T. David Rutherford as Grandpa
- Tiffany Shepis as Jane, Party Girl
- Jayden Jaymes as Destiny
- Taryn Southern as Joy
- Nikki Todd as Emma
- Zelda Williams as Kelly Martinson
- Mike Jones as Grooms-Man
- Alex Skeie as Skeetloaf

== Production ==
The Frankenstein Brothers was conceived in 2008 by brothers Lee Roy and Kane Kunz. Lee Roy studied at the USC School of Cinematic Arts, and Kane at Dartmouth College, the project acquired financing in May 2009. The team drew heavily upon its primary financiers’ powerful Denver network to obtain nearly unprecedented access to local shooting locations and resources at free or vastly discounted rates to achieve extraordinarily high production values.

In spring 2009, Kunz began recruiting young filmmakers from USC and the greater Los Angeles communities, fleshing out remaining crew positions with experienced industry veterans. Principal photography commenced on September 2, 2009, and wrapped on September 25.
