= Zelda Williams =

American actress and director (born 1989)

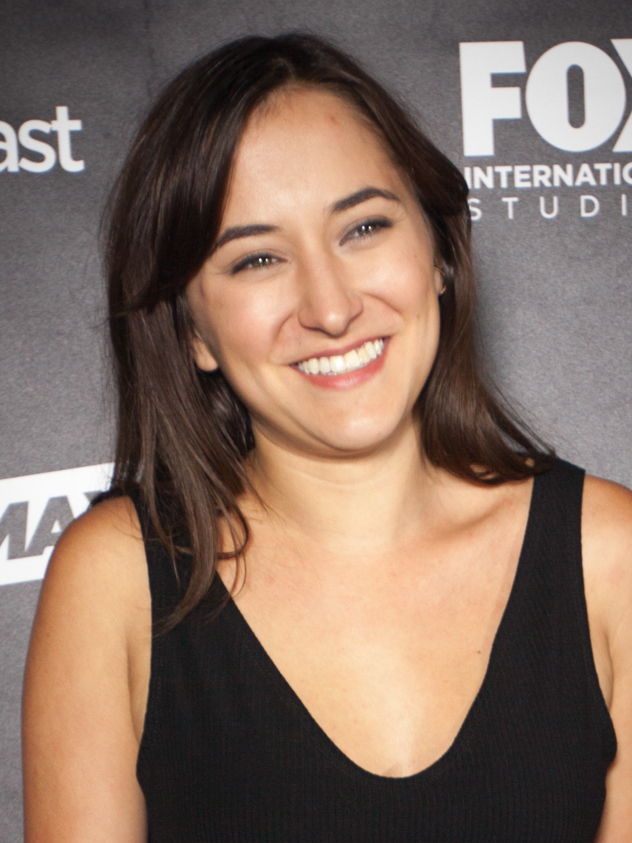
- Williams in 2015
- Born: Zelda Rae Williams; July 31, 1989 (age 37); New York, New York, U.S.
- Occupations: Actress; director; producer; writer
- Years active: 1994–present
- Parents: Robin Williams (father); Marsha Garces Williams (mother)
- Relatives: Anselm J. McLaurin (great great great-grandfather)

Zelda Rae Williams (born July 31, 1989) is an American actress, director, producer and writer. As a voice actress, she is best known for voicing Kuvira in the Nickelodeon series The Legend of Korra and Mona Lisa in the 2012 Teenage Mutant Ninja Turtles series. Williams is the daughter of actor Robin Williams and film producer Marsha Garces Williams.

== Early life ==
Williams was born in New York City to Robin and Marsha Garces Williams. Her father stated that he named her after Princess Zelda from The Legend of Zelda video game series. Her mother is of Filipino and Finnish descent. Zelda, the older of Williams' children by his second wife, has a younger brother and an older half-brother.

== Career ==
Williams made her acting debut at age five. At 15, she acted in the 2004 film House of D opposite her father and actor Anton Yelchin as the latter's young first love, Melissa Loggia.

In June 2011, Zelda and Robin Williams were featured in a television commercial for the Nintendo 3DS game The Legend of Zelda: Ocarina of Time 3D. On October 25, 2011, she was the special guest host at the London Zelda Symphony Concert at the Hammersmith Apollo, marking the 25th anniversary of The Legend of Zelda franchise. On November 17, 2011, subscribers to Nintendo emails received an email of her and her father playing The Legend of Zelda: Skyward Sword for the Wii console. She appears in an interview with Nintendo representatives in which she says that one of her favorite things to do in her free time is play Super Smash Bros. Melee with her friends, always playing as the character Sheik.

She appeared in People magazine's 100 Most Beautiful People issue for 2007. She appears in the Wynter Gordon music video for "Buy My Love" and has a cameo in the Cobra Starship music video "You Make Me Feel", alongside her father.

In 2018, Williams wrote and directed the short film Shrimp, which she also starred in alongside Conor Leslie, Paulina Singer, Frances Fisher, and Jake Abel. The film depicts the lives of dominatrices in a Los Angeles BDSM den. Williams later entered into a deal with Gunpowder & Sky to develop the short film into a half-hour series.

She directed the 2024 film Lisa Frankenstein, her feature-length debut.

== Personal life ==
Williams is bisexual.

She has stated that The Legend of Zelda: Majora's Mask is her favorite game and voiced support of its rerelease on the Nintendo 3DS by supporting the fan campaign Operation Moonfall. From 2013 until 2016, Williams dated actor Jackson Heywood.

Williams has spoken out against AI-generated images after videos of her father flooded the internet following the release of OpenAI's Sora.

== Acting credits ==
=== Film ===
Year	Title	Role	Notes	Ref.
1995	Nine Months	Little Girl #3 in Ballet Class		
2004	House of D	Melissa Loggia		
2008	Were the World Mine	Frankie		
2009	Don't Look Up	Matya		
2010	Luster	Victor Curruthers		
2010	Detention	Sara		
2010	See You on the Other Side	Zoey Meola	Short film	
2010	Jezuz Loves Chaztity	Chaztity	Short film	
2011	Stupid Questions	Lucy	Short film	
2012	The Frankenstein Brothers	Kelly Martinson	Also known as A Beer Tale	
2012	Noobz	Rickie		
2014	Never	Nikki		
2014	Maddie Moonwater	Maddie	Short film	
2016	Meet Cute	Andy	Short film	
2018	Locating Silver Lake	Ella		
2018	Shrimp	Jess	Also director, producer and writer	
2018	A Patch of Desert	—N/a	Short film	
2020	A Disagreement About Flies	Lydia	Short film	
2022	Julius Caesar Live!	Portia, Soothsayer		
2025	Holo	Grey	Short film	

=== Television ===
Year	Title	Role	Notes	Ref.
1994	In Search of Dr. Seuss	Daughter	Television film	
2012	Checked Out	Marissa	Main role; 4 episodes	
2013–2014	Teen Wolf	Caitlin	Recurring role; Episodes "Fireflies" and "Illuminated"	
2014	Chaotic Awesome		Episode: #1.12	
2014	The Legend of Korra	Kuvira	Recurring voice role; 11 episodes	
2015–2017	Teenage Mutant Ninja Turtles	Y'Gythgba / Mona Lisa	Recurring voice role; 5 episodes	
2016	Dead of Summer	Drew Reeves	Main role; 10 episodes	
2016	Chelsea	Herself	Talk show	
2016	Girl in the Box	Janice Hooker	Television film	
2016	Unlocked: The World of Games, Revealed	Herself	Documentary	
2017	Stitchers	Zelda	Episode: "The Gremlin and the Fixer"	
2017	Criminal Minds	Melissa Miller	Episode: "False Flag"	
2019	Dark/Web	Cheshire	Episode: "Chapter Three"; also director, producer and writer	
2019	Jane the Virgin	Leona	Episode: "Chapter Eighty-Seven"	
2019–2020	Rise of the Teenage Mutant Ninja Turtles	Foot Recruit/Cassandra 'Casey' Jones	Recurring voice role	
2024	Transformers: EarthSpark	Spitfire	Recurring voice role; 6 episodes	

=== Music videos ===
Year	Title	Artist	Role	Ref.
2011	"You Make Me Feel..."	Cobra Starship		
2013	"I Believed In God"	Danko Jones	Woman	
2014	"Imagine" (UNICEF: World version)	Various	Herself	

=== Video games ===
Year	Title	Voice role	Notes
2016	King's Quest - Chapter III: Once Upon A Climb	Amaya Blackstone	
2022	The Last Worker	Emma	

== Filmmaking credits ==
=== Film ===
Year	Title	Director	Writer	Producer	Notes
2018	Shrimp	Yes	Yes	Yes	Also actor
2020	Kappa Kappa Die	Yes	No	No	
2024	Lisa Frankenstein	Yes	No	No	

=== Music videos ===
Year	Title	Artist	Role	Ref.
2016	"Save My Soul"	JoJo	Director	
2018	"Invisible"	Anna Clendening	Director	
2019	"Dead End"	Anna Clendening	Director	
2019	"Bend & Break"	Anna Clendening	Director	
2020	"Lonely Hearts"	JoJo	Director	
2020	"Think About You"	JoJo	Director	
