= Shrimp (film) =

2018 short film by Zelda Williams

- Film poster
- Directed by: Zelda Williams
- Written by: Zelda Williams
- Produced by: Joshua Thurston; Zelda Williams
- Starring: Conor Leslie; Zelda Williams; Paulina Singer; Frances Fisher; Jake Abel; Jacob Zachar; Danielle Campbell
- Cinematography: Rasa Partin
- Edited by: Sari Tracht; Joe Shahood
- Music by: Thomas Rawle
- Release date: September 22, 2018 (Tribeca)
- Running time: 22 minutes
- Country: United States
- Language: English

Shrimp is a 2018 short comedy-drama film written and directed by Zelda Williams. It stars Conor Leslie, Paulina Singer, and Williams as dominatrices in a Los Angeles BDSM den. The title of the film is a reference to the term given to the dominatrices' male clients.

The film premiered at the Tribeca Film Festival on September 22, 2018. Following its premiere, the rights to Shrimp were purchased by Gunpowder & Sky to develop the film into a series.

== Plot ==
Dominatrices Sasha, Jess, and Angelina work under the supervision of head mistress Marie at a BDSM den, where they inflict pain and humiliation upon their male clients. Jess is a free-spirited exhibitionist and Angelina is married to a client, while Sasha has avoided relationships because of her occupation. Wanting to change Sasha's outlook, Marie sets her up with a blind date she tells Sasha is her friend's son.

After completing their shifts, Sasha meets her date Daniel at a bar, Jess engages in cunnilingus with a young woman in the bar's restroom, and Angelina and her husband enjoy a private romantic evening. Sasha and Daniel remain at the bar until closing and Daniel convinces Sasha to accompany him to a park. The two spend the night together and fall asleep on a bench.

The next morning, Angelina is attacked by a client, but Sasha rescues her. Sasha's actions earn praise from Marie and she asks Sasha to leave the den with her when it closes for the day. Upon stepping outside, the two women encounter Daniel, who is revealed as Marie's son. Put in an awkward position by this revelation, Sasha finds herself at a loss for words.

== Cast ==
- Conor Leslie as Sasha
- Zelda Williams as Jess
- Paulina Singer as Angelina
- Frances Fisher as Marie
- Jake Abel as Daniel
- Jacob Zachar as Angelina's husband
- Danielle Campbell as Jess' date

Additionally, Taika Waititi portrays a bartender and co-producer Joshua Thurston plays Marie's client, referred to as the horse gimp. Sasha Lane has an uncredited appearance as one of the dominatrices.

== Production ==
Writer/director Zelda Williams stated that she was inspired to create Shrimp after a man at a bar mistook her for a dominatrix. Following a look into a local BDSM den, Williams found the den to be "a different world" from fictional portrayals prior to her film. Describing the dens as "incredibly understanding" and "non-judgmental", Williams commented that their foundation is based "on consent and openness".

== Potential television series ==
After Shrimp premiered at the Tribeca Film Festival, Williams entered into a deal with Gunpowder & Sky in November 2018 to develop the short film into a half-hour series. Gunpowder & Sky CEO Van Toffler said the company was drawn to the film because Williams "was able to take a generally taboo topic, turn it on its head and tap into the day-to-day happenings of the dominatrix community and tell their story in an authentic way".
