= Ashley Aufderheide =

American actress

- Born: New York City, New York
- Occupation: Actress
- Years active: 2014–present

Ashley Aufderheide is an American actress. She is best known for playing Gwen Runck in the teen sitcom That '90s Show and Mia Evans in the thriller series Emergence.

== Early life ==
Aufderheide was born in New York City but grew up in Greenwich, Connecticut. She is a graduate of Greenwich Academy.

== Career ==
Her first appearance on the big screen was in Infinitely Polar Bear starring Mark Ruffalo and Zoe Saldaña. Her first recurring role came playing Mia Evans in the thriller series Emergence. Her biggest role so far has been playing Gwen Runck in the teen sitcom That '90s Show.

== Filmography ==
=== Film ===
Year	Title	Role	Notes
2014	Infinitely Polar Bear	Faith Stuart	Short
2017	High School Lover	Rachel Winters	
2017	Going in Style	Kanika	
2020	Four Kids and It	Smash	

=== Television ===
Year	Title	Role	Notes
2014	Unforgettable	Maya Rawlins-Murray	Episode; Fire and Ice
2015	The Slap	Melissa	3 episodes
2016	Preacher	Young Tulip	2 episodes
2019–2020	Emergence	Mia Evans	13 episodes
2023–2024	That '90s Show	Gwen Runck	26 episodes
