= House of D =

- Theatrical release poster
- Directed by: David Duchovny
- Written by: David Duchovny
- Produced by: Jane Rosenthal; Bob Yari; Richard B. Lewis
- Starring: Anton Yelchin; Téa Leoni; David Duchovny; Robin Williams; Erykah Badu; Frank Langella
- Cinematography: Michael Chapman
- Edited by: Suzy Elmiger
- Music by: Geoff Zanelli
- Production companies: Tribeca Productions; Ovation Entertainment; Bob Yari Productions; Southpaw Entertainment
- Distributed by: Lions Gate Films
- Release dates: May 7, 2004 (Tribeca); April 15, 2005 (United States)
- Running time: 97 minutes
- Country: United States
- Languages: English; French
- Budget: $6 million
- Box office: $388,532

House of D is a 2004 American coming-of-age comedy-drama film written and directed by David Duchovny in his directorial debut. The film stars Duchovny, Anton Yelchin, Téa Leoni, Erykah Badu, Frank Langella, Zelda Williams and Robin Williams. It was screened at the 2004 Tribeca Film Festival.

== Synopsis ==
American artist Tom Warshaw lives a bohemian existence in Paris, trying to make sense of his troubled adult life by reflecting on his extraordinary childhood.

Prompted by his son's thirteenth birthday, Tom experiences a flashback to Greenwich Village in 1974 when he himself was 14 years old. While his bereaved single mother mourns the recent death of his father, Tommy escapes grief by causing trouble at school and making afternoon deliveries with his best friend Pappass, a middle-aged mentally challenged janitor.

Tommy befriends Lady, a woman incarcerated in the New York Women's House of Detention. Tommy experiences his first taste of love. When Tommy's mother dies by overdosing on sedatives, Lady helps him to realize that he should leave New York to live life anew. Pappass helps Tommy purchase a plane ticket to Paris.

Thirty years later, Tommy returns to Greenwich Village to confront his unfinished past.

== Cast ==
- David Duchovny as Tom Warshaw (Adult)
- Anton Yelchin as Tommy Warshaw (Young)
- Robin Williams as Pappass
- Téa Leoni as Mrs. Warshaw
- Erykah Badu as Lady / Bernadette
- Adam LeFevre as Monty
- Frank Langella as Rev. Duncan
- Zelda Williams as Melissa
- Orlando Jones as Superfly
- Mark Margolis as Mr. Pappass
- Willie Garson as Ticket Agent
- Andrée Damant as French Woman in Window

At the time of filming, David Duchovny and Tea Leoni were married in real life.

== Reception ==
=== Critical response ===
On the review aggregator website Rotten Tomatoes, 10% of 101 critics' reviews are positive, with an average rating of 3.8/10. The website's consensus reads: "A sincere but inept coming of age story." Metacritic, which uses a weighted average, assigned the film a score of 33 out of 100, based on 31 critics, indicating "generally unfavorable" reviews.

Roger Ebert of the Chicago Sun-Times gave the film one and a half out of four stars and wrote, "Yes, I take notes during the movies. I can't always read them, but I persist in hoping that I can. During a movie like House of D, I jot down words I think might be useful in the review. Peering now at my 3×5 cards, I read sappy, inane, cornball, shameless and, my favorite, doofusoid. I sigh. The film has not even inspired interesting adjectives, except for the one I made up myself."

=== Box office ===
The film was released in theaters on April 15, 2005. It grossed $36,371 during its opening week. The next week, it grossed $7,441. In the film's third week, it grossed $210,826, the most during its run. In the film's fourth and final theatrical week, it grossed $30,386, for a total of $389,199 worldwide.

== Home media ==
The film was released on DVD on October 4, 2005. The DVD contains special features, including commentary with David Duchovny and the cast, and a behind-the-scenes featurette called The Making of House of D.
