= Marsha Garces Williams =

American film producer (born 1956)

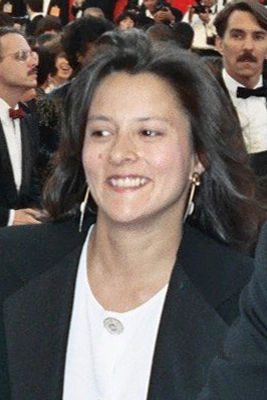
- Garces Williams at the 61st Academy Awards in 1989
- Born: Marsha Lynn Garces; June 18, 1956 (age 70); Milwaukee, Wisconsin, U.S.
- Occupations: Film producer; philanthropist
- Years active: 1991–present
- Spouse: Robin Williams (m. 1989; div. 2010)
- Children: 2, including Zelda

Marsha Lynn Garces Williams (née Garces; born June 18, 1956) is an American film producer and philanthropist. She was married to actor and comedian Robin Williams from 1989 to 2010.

== Early life ==
Marsha Lynn Garces was born in Milwaukee, Wisconsin. She grew up in Shorewood, Wisconsin, and attended Shorewood High School. Garces' father, Leon Garces, was Filipino and born in Ubay, Bohol; he moved to the United States in 1929. He later served in the United States Navy during World War II. Her mother, Ina Rachel Mattila, was Finnish.

== Personal life and career ==
Garces met Robin Williams in 1984 when she was employed as a nanny for Williams's son Zachary. Previously, Garces was a painter and a waitress. Williams and Valerie Velardi, who he was married to at the time, never fully reconciled and divorced in 1988. Garces became pregnant with Williams' child late in 1988, and the pair were married on April 30, 1989. According to his first wife, the romantic relationship between Williams and Garces began after they separated. During their marriage, they had two children, Zelda Rae and Cody Alan, born in 1989 and 1991, respectively. In March 2008, she filed for divorce from Williams, citing irreconcilable differences. Their divorce was finalized in 2010.

After working as the family's nanny, Garces worked with Williams as his personal assistant on films such as Good Morning, Vietnam (1987) and Dead Poets Society (1989). She was later the producer for several of Williams's films. Together, they founded a film production company, Blue Wolf Productions, in 1991.

Garces Williams has been involved philanthropically with organizations such as Doctors Without Borders and Seacology.

== Filmography ==
- 1993 – Mrs. Doubtfire
- 1998 – Patch Adams
- 1999 – Jakob the Liar
- 2002 – Robin Williams: Live on Broadway
- 2014 – Extinction Soup

== Awards ==
- 1993 – Golden Globe Award for Best Motion Picture – Musical or Comedy – Mrs Doubtfire
- 2003 – Nominated for a Primetime Emmy Award for Outstanding Variety, Music, or Comedy Special – Robin Williams: Live on Broadway
