= Alexa Swinton =

American actress

- Swinton in 2026
- Born: July 2, 2009 (age 17); New York City, U.S.
- Occupations: Actress, singer, songwriter
- Years active: 2012–present

Alexa Jacqueline Skye Idelchik Swinton (born July 2, 2009) is an American actress, singer and songwriter. She appeared in a lead role as Piper in the 13-episode of the ABC Prime Time series Emergence, has a recurring role as Eva Rhoades in Billions, in the HBO series And Just Like That..., in which she plays the character of Rock Goldenblatt, as the Red Room trainee Anya in the 2025 Marvel Cinematic Universe superhero film Thunderbolts* and she appeared in M. Night Shyamalan's 2021 film Old, playing the role of Maddox Cappa as a child.

== Career ==
Swinton originated the role of Addie in Make Believe, written by Bess Wohl, and directed by Jackson Gay at the Hartford Stage. Swinton's first leading role in television was as Piper in Emergence. The show ran for 13 episodes from 2019 to 2020. She first performed her original song "You, Me and My Purple Docs" publicly on Canadian TV station CHCH-DT in Hamilton, Ontario. Swinton has a recurring role as Eva Rhoades, the daughter of main characters Chuck and Wendy Rhoades in Showtime's television drama Billions. She acted in M. Night Shyamalan's feature film Old playing the role of young Maddox.

She plays the recurring role of Rock Goldenblatt, child of Charlotte York Goldenblatt in the HBO series And Just Like That... Swinton's role has been called "groundbreaking".

== Personal life ==
Swinton is of paternal Scottish heritage and is distantly related to the actress Tilda Swinton. A resident of New Jersey, she is Jewish, as is her mother, and celebrated her bat mitzvah in Israel in 2023.

== Filmography ==
=== Film ===
Year	Title	Role	Notes
2012	River of Fundament	Norman Mailer's daughter	Feature film
2014	Little Brain Surgeries	Girl from the Vision	Short
2017	Speed of Light	Young Rose	Short
2018	I've Lost Her	Young Maggie	Short
2018	Nettles	Sam	Short
2018	BeLoved	Julia	Short
2019	Reverb	Annie	Short
2019	Sometime Other Than Now	Molly	Feature film
2021	Old	11-year-old Maddox Cappa	Feature film
2022	Love's Baby Soft	Dolores	Short
2023	Maestro	Nina Bernstein	Feature film
2025	Thunderbolts*	Anya	Feature film
2026	Behemoth!	Viviana Glenn	Feature film
TBA	Wreckless	Joni	Feature film; filming

=== Television ===
Year	Title	Role	Notes
2012	Mythos	Ellie	4 episodes
2014	Zach Fox Show	Kid Playing with Toy	
2015	Flesh and Bone	Young Claire	Scorched Earth
2015	Today	Badly Behaving Child	Rossen Reports
2015	The View	Herself	Modeling appearance
2016	Saturday Night Live	Daughter of Big Family	Selena Gomez Guest Host
2016–2023	Billions	Eva Rhoades	Appears in multiple episodes each season
2017	Saturday Night Live	Girl in Immigration Line	Alec Baldwin Guest Host
2018	The Tonight Show	Punk Kid	Ice Cube / Dale Earnhardt Jr.
2019	Manifest	Chloe	Upgrade
2019–2020	Emergence	Piper	Series regular
2021–2025	And Just Like That...	Rock Goldenblatt	17 episodes

=== Theater ===
Year	Title	Role	Notes
2016	Annie Warbucks	Molly	Signature Theatre
2017	Madeline's Christmas	Anne	Lion Theatre
2017	Kooky Spook	Young Inna	Duke Theatre
2017	Santa Doesn't Come to the Holiday Inn	Daughter	Ensemble Studio Theatre
2017	The Department Party	Violet	Playwright Horizons
2018	Make Believe	Addie	Hartford Stage

== Discography ==
Studio recording

- You, Me and My Purple Docs (2020)
- Happy As I Wanna Be (2021)
- What Would I Change It To (2022)
