= High School Lover =

2017 film

- Directed by: Jerell Rosales
- Written by: Amber Coney; Jessica Dube
- Produced by: Vince Jolivette
- Starring: Paulina Singer; François Arnaud; Lana Condor; Tyler Alvarez; Julia Jones; James Franco
- Cinematography: Christina Voros
- Edited by: Julia Kots
- Music by: Tim O'Keefe
- Production company: Elysium Bandini Studios
- Distributed by: Lionsgate
- Release date: January 20, 2017
- Running time: 86 minutes
- Country: United States
- Language: English

High School Lover is a 2017 American romantic thriller directed by Jerell Rosales in his theatrical directorial debut. The film stars Paulina Singer, François Arnaud, Lana Condor, Tyler Alvarez, Julia Jones, and James Franco. It premiered in Los Angeles on January of 20, 2017 and then went on to have a television premiere on Lifetime.

== Plot ==
After Kelly Winters, a 17-year-old high school senior, falls in love with Christian Booth, a famous actor who is 9 years older than her, Rick (also a cinematographer) tries to intervene before the crush turns into a dangerous obsession.

== Cast ==
- Paulina Singer as Kelley Winters
- François Arnaud as Christian Booth
- Lana Condor as Allison
- Tyler Alvarez as Larry
- Julia Jones as Samantha Winters
- James Franco as Rick Winters
- Ashley Aufderheide as Rachel Winters
- Julian Elijah Martinez as Timothy West
- Julian Cihi as Journey Segal
- Renee Morrison as Jules Kenny
- Prince Rama as themselves
- David Alan Madrick as Richard Barley
- Vince Jolivette as Film Director Sean
- Fran Kravitz as High School Teacher
- Emmy Elliott as High School Student (uncredited)
- Allan Anthony Williams as Dave
- Angelica S Alvarez as Rosie (uncredited)
- Denisa Juhos as Actress
- Jess Domain as Actress
- Michelle Romano as Actress (uncredited)
- Leigh Fitzjames as Clare
- Yevgeniya Kats as Christian's Fan (uncredited)
- Aly Mang as Christian's Fan (uncredited)
- Merritt Chase as Club Patron (uncredited)
- Hansel Pacheco as Club Patron (uncredited)
- Brady Bryson as Boy in Club (uncredited)
- Jacqueline Honulik as Model (uncredited)
- Alexis Martinez as Model (uncredited)

== Production ==
The feature film was shot in August and September 2016 on location in New York City. In January 2017, it was announced that Franco stars in the film and serves as an executive producer. It was also reported that Paulina Singer (ABC/Freeform's Dead of Summer) and François Arnaud (Star of NBC's Midnight Texas) have lead roles in the film.

== Release ==
On January 20, 2017, it made its theatrical world premiere at Laemmle's Royal Theater in Los Angeles, where it played for one week.

In January 2017, it was announced that the film would be a part of Lifetime's slate, and premiered on February 4, 2017.

On November 21, 2017, the film was released on DVD, distributed by Lionsgate under license from A+E Networks.
