= Going in Style (2017 film) =

2017 film by Zach Braff

- Theatrical release poster
- Directed by: Zach Braff
- Screenplay by: Theodore Melfi
- Based on: Going in Style by Edward Cannon
- Produced by: Donald De Line
- Starring: Morgan Freeman; Michael Caine; Alan Arkin; Ann-Margret; Joey King; Matt Dillon; Christopher Lloyd
- Cinematography: Rodney Charters
- Edited by: Myron Kerstein
- Music by: Rob Simonsen
- Production companies: New Line Cinema; Village Roadshow Pictures; RatPac-Dune Entertainment; De Line Pictures
- Distributed by: Warner Bros. Pictures
- Release dates: March 30, 2017 (SVA Theatre); April 7, 2017 (United States)
- Running time: 96 minutes
- Country: United States
- Language: English
- Budget: $25 million
- Box office: $85.2 million

Going in Style is a 2017 American heist comedy film directed by Zach Braff and written by Theodore Melfi. A remake of the 1979 film of the same name, it stars Morgan Freeman, Michael Caine, Alan Arkin, Joey King, Matt Dillon, Christopher Lloyd, Ann-Margret, John Ortiz and Siobhan Fallon Hogan. It follows a trio of retirees (Freeman, Caine, and Arkin) who plan to rob a bank after their pensions are canceled.

The film premiered at the SVA Theatre on March 30, 2017, and was released in the United States on April 7, 2017. It received mixed reviews from critics and grossed $85 million worldwide against its $25 million budget.

== Plot ==
Joe, Willie, and Albert are senior citizens and lifelong friends in Brooklyn. During an unpleasant appointment at the bank, Joe witnesses a robbery in progress carried out by three individuals wearing masks.

During the robbery, Joe notices the leader bearing a Mongol warrior tattoo on his neck, the only lead that could help the police identify the culprit. The man sympathizes with Joe when he finds out about his current financial situation brought on by the bank. The robbers escape with over $1.6 million.

When the company where the trio worked is bought out, their pensions become a casualty of the restructuring. Joe is hit particularly hard and finds out that he, his daughter Rachel and granddaughter Brooklyn, will be homeless in less than thirty days as his mortgage payments unfairly increased and his pension stopped coming in.

Willie finds out he is terminally ill from kidney failure and needs a transplant. He is even more frustrated because his financial situation forces him into a long-distance relationship with his daughter and granddaughter.

Inspired by experiencing the robbery, Joe originates the idea to rob the bank and take back what is rightfully theirs. At first, Albert and Willie are appalled, but eventually agree when they later learn that their bank intends to steal their pensions.

Trying to shoplift some items from a grocery store, where Albert's love interest Annie works, results in a comic disaster. So, the trio turn to Joe's former son-in-law, Peter Murphy, and professional criminal and pet store owner Jesús to teach them the ropes. They plan on using their lodge's carnival as a cover.

Joe, Willie, and Albert disguise themselves as "The Rat Pack" (Frank Sinatra, Dean Martin, and Sammy Davis Jr.) and use guns with blanks so no one gets hurt. The robbery almost goes awry when Willie collapses briefly, and Lucy, a child witness, partially pulls off his mask to help him breathe better. She sees the watch he wears with a picture of his granddaughter on it, so he engages in a friendly conversation and makes her feel less intimidated.

The trio manages to take over $2.3 million. However, they are soon arrested on suspicion by FBI Agent Hamer, as the grocery store manager recognizes Albert's walk from the video surveillance cameras, but they all stick to their alibis.

Hamer puts them, along with other senior suspects, into a police lineup for Lucy to identify the robbers. She refuses to identify Willie, leaving Hamer with no case. Willie suffers from total kidney failure and is near death until Albert agrees to donate a kidney.

While part of the money is used to help the three friends with their financial situations, the rest is given to their families, friends, co-workers, and fellow members at the lodge. Joe finally gets his granddaughter the puppy he promised her if she got A's in every subject at school; courtesy of Jesús, who is later revealed to be the leader of those involved in the robbery Joe witnessed and helps launder the money that they stole.

The tattoo on Jesús' neck is also revealed to have been a fake made of henna, intended to throw the FBI and the police off the scent. The movie ends at Albert and Annie's wedding, as the three friends celebrate their good fortune.

== Cast ==
- Morgan Freeman as Willie Davis, Kanika's grandfather and Maya's father, who shares an apartment with Albert.
- Michael Caine as Joe Harding, Brooklyn's grandfather, Rachel's father and Peter's father-in-law.
- Alan Arkin as Albert Garner, Annie's love interest and saxophone teacher.
- Ann-Margret as Annie Santori, Albert's love interest, Ezra's grandmother, and an employee at Value Town.
- John Ortiz as Jesús Garcia, a Queens pet store owner and the leader of robbers, who agrees to help the guys.
- Peter Serafinowicz as Peter Murphy, Joe's former son-in-law, Rachel's former husband, and Brooklyn's estranged father.
- Joey King as Brooklyn Harding, Joe's granddaughter and Peter and Rachel's daughter.
- Matt Dillon as Special Agent Arlen Hamer, an FBI agent who investigates bank robberies.
- Christopher Lloyd as Milton Kupchak, the guys' senile lodge buddy.
- Josh Pais as Chuck Lofton, Williamsburg Savings Bank manager, who intends to foreclose Joe's house in a month.
- Maria Dizzia as Rachel Harding, Joe's daughter, Peter's ex-wife and Brooklyn's mother.
- Ashley Aufderheide as Kanika Davis, Willie's granddaughter and Maya's daughter.
- Seth Barrish as Dr. Helton
- Siobhan Fallon Hogan as Mitzi, a waitress at Nat's Diner.
- Jeremy Bobb as Donald Lewis
- Anthony Chisholm as Paul, the Knights Grandmaster.
- Gillian Glasco as Maya Davis, Willie's daughter and Kanika's mother.
- Jeremy Schinder as Ezra Bronkowski, Annie's grandson.
- Kenan Thompson as Keith Schonfield, a grocery store manager of Value Town.
- Annabelle Chow as Lucy, Mandy's daughter and the child witness.
- Nancy Sun as Mandy, Lucy's mother.

== Production ==
=== Development ===
On October 12, 2012, it was announced that New Line Cinema and Warner Bros. Pictures were developing a remake of the 1979 heist comedy film Going in Style, with Theodore Melfi set to write the script. Donald De Line was on board to produce the film with Tony Bill, producer of the original film, as executive producer. Melfi was approached by De Line and Andrew Haas about writing the screenplay for the remake, but Melfi insisted on changing the ending to something more upbeat. Melfi explained:

In this modern era, and even for me, I don't want to see a movie where my heroes whom I've been fighting for and rooting for for two hours die or go to jail. I want to see them get ahead, and it's perfect for them to get ahead these days because everyone hates banks now. So let's have them put the perfect heist together, rob a bank, get away with it, and go off into the sunset. They said, 'Yes, let's do that,' and that's how that script was born.

On January 9, 2013, Don Scardino was hired to direct the film. On September 19, 2013, Melfi, who wrote the script, was in talks to direct the film. On November 19, 2014, it was revealed that Zach Braff was in talks with the studio to direct the film, but he was not officially offered yet. On November 19, 2014, it was announced that Morgan Freeman and Michael Caine were cast in the film to play the lead roles, while Dustin Hoffman was in talks to join them. On April 9, 2015, Alan Arkin joined the cast of the film to complete the lead cast of three. On August 3, 2015, Joey King joined the cast of the film to play Caine's character's granddaughter. On August 10, 2015, Matt Dillon was added to the cast to play an FBI agent named Hamer, pursuing the three elderly lifelong friends and robbers. The same day, Ann-Margret was cast in the film for an unspecified role.

=== Filming ===
Principal photography on the film began in Brooklyn, New York City, on August 3, 2015. Filming also took place in Astoria, Queens.

=== Soundtrack ===
The film features original music by composer Rob Simonsen, as well as songs by various artists and two of its stars:

1. "Memories Are Made of This" – Dean Martin
2. "St. Thomas" – Sonny Rollins
3. "Feel Right" – Mark Ronson feat. Mystikal
4. "Hard to Handle" – Otis Redding
5. "Can I Kick It?" – A Tribe Called Quest
6. "Hey, Look Me Over" – Jamie Cullum
7. "Hallelujah I Love Her So" – Alan Arkin, Ann-Margret
8. "Mean Old World" – Sam Cooke
9. "What a Diff'rence a Day Makes" – Dinah Washington

Music not included in the soundtrack but heard in the film includes:

1. "A Long Walk Out" – Leslie Mills
2. "Yankee Doodle" – Lawrence Feldman
3. "Happy Birthday to You" – Christopher Lloyd, cast
4. "Automatic" – Brock Walsh, Mark Goldenberg
5. "Higher Ground" – Stevie Wonder
6. "Hey, Look Me Over" – Morgan Freeman, Michael Caine, and Alan Arkin
7. "Sobre las Olas" – Juventino Rosas, carnival grounds instrumental

== Release ==
Going in Style was released on April 7, 2017, which Warner Bros. Pictures moved from an original May 6, 2016 date.

=== Box office ===
Going in Style grossed $45 million in the United States and Canada and $39.6 million in other territories for a worldwide gross of $85.2 million, against a production budget of $25 million.

In North America, the film opened alongside Smurfs: The Lost Village and The Case for Christ, and was projected to gross around $8 million from 3,061 theaters in its opening weekend. It grossed $4.2 million on its first day and $11.9 million over the weekend, finishing above expectations and 4th at the box office. In its second weekend the film grossed $6.3 million (a drop of 47%), finishing 5th at the box office.

=== Critical response ===
On Rotten Tomatoes, the film has an approval rating of 47% based on 171 reviews, with an average rating of 5.4/10. The site's critical consensus reads, "Despite the considerable talent of its leads, Going in Style is light on laughs and plays it safe far too often." On Metacritic, the film has a weighted average score 50 out of 100, based on 31 critics, indicating "mixed or average" reviews. Audiences polled by CinemaScore gave the film an average grade of "B+" on an A+ to F scale, while PostTrak reported filmgoers gave it an overall positive score of 83%.
