= Dead of Summer (TV series) =

2016 American supernatural horror TV series

- Genre: Teen drama; Period drama; Horror; Supernatural
- Created by: Edward Kitsis; Adam Horowitz; Ian Goldberg
- Starring: Elizabeth Mitchell; Elizabeth Lail; Amber Coney; Alberto Frezza; Eli Goree; Mark Indelicato; Ronen Rubinstein; Paulina Singer; Zelda Williams
- Composer: Joseph Trapanese
- Country of origin: United States
- Original language: English
- No. of seasons: 1
- No. of episodes: 10

Production
- Executive producers: Steve Pearlman; Ian Goldberg; Edward Kitsis; Adam Horowitz
- Producers: Kathy Gilroy; Brian Wankum
- Production location: Vancouver, British Columbia
- Cinematography: David Moxness
- Editor: Geofrey Hildrew
- Production companies: Kitsis/Horowitz; ABC Signature

Original release
- Network: Freeform
- Release: June 28 – August 30, 2016

Dead of Summer is an American supernatural horror television series created by Adam Horowitz, Edward Kitsis and Ian Goldberg for Freeform. The series is set in the 1980s at Camp Stillwater, a Midwestern summer camp. In November 2015, Freeform gave a straight-to-series order. The series was conceived as an anthology, with each season conceived as a self-contained miniseries, following a different set of characters in similar settings.

The series premiered on June 28, 2016, and concluded on August 30, 2016. That November, Freeform cancelled the series after one season.

== Premise ==
Set in 1989, school is out for the summer, and a sun-drenched season of firsts beckons the counselors at Camp Stillwater, a seemingly idyllic Midwestern summer camp, including first loves, first kisses—and first kills. Stillwater's dark, ancient mythology awakens, and what was supposed to be a summer of fun soon turns into one of unforgettable scares and evil at every turn.

== Cast and characters ==
=== Main ===
- Elizabeth Mitchell as Deborah "Deb" Carpenter
- Elizabeth Lail as Amy Hughes
- Amber Coney as Carolina "Cricket" Diaz
- Alberto Frezza as Deputy Garrett "Townie" Sykes
- Eli Goree as Joel Goodson
- Mark Indelicato as Blair Ramos
- Ronen Rubinstein as Alex Powell (born: Alexi Fayvinov)
- Paulina Singer as Jessica "Jessie/Braces" Tyler
- Zelda Williams as Drew Reeves (born: Andrea Dalton)

=== Recurring ===
- Charles Mesure as Sheriff Boyd Heelan / The Teacher
- Tony Todd as Holyoke, the Tall Man
- Andrew J. West as Damon Crowley
- Donnie Cochrane as Parker
- Zachary Gordon as Jason "Blotter" Cohen
- Janet Kidder as Mrs. Sykes

=== Guest ===
- Dylan Neal as Keith Jones
- Alex Fernandez as Hector Diaz
- Sharon Leal as Renee Tyler
- Dan Payne as Jack Sykes
- Taylor Russell as Laura
- Lovell Adams-Gray as Michael

== Episodes ==
No.	Title	Directed by	Written by	Original release date	US viewers (millions)
1	"Patience"	Adam Horowitz	Edward Kitsis, Adam Horowitz, and Ian Goldberg	June 28, 2016	0.63
During the summer of 1989, childhood friends and camp counselors reach the campsite three days before the camp is to start. Amy is a first-timer to the camp and sees herself as an outsider. The summer camp janitor is found dead. While in the woods, Amy visits the janitor's cabin with Garrett. However, Amy has a vision of the ghosts attacking her moments before the cabin catches fire. The two escape, but Amy is attacked afterwards by the ghosts. Flashbacks show Amy transferring to a new school and meeting her lab partner, Margo, who dislikes her. The two eventually become best friends and plan to go to Camp Stillwater together. However, at a house party which the two attend, the police show up to arrest Margo who flees upstairs with Amy. Margo ends up dangling off the roof while Amy tries to help her, which results in Margo slipping and falling to her death. Amy goes swimming with the rest of the campers in the lake; all watch the footage together, which shows a ghostly figure standing behind the river, before the television switches off without them knowing.
2	"Barney Rubble Eyes"	Ron Underwood	Ian Goldberg	July 5, 2016 (Note: The second episode, "Barney Rubble Eyes", was released online on June 28, 2016, after the premiere of the first episode.)	0.49
The campers arrive to Camp Stillwater and quickly Alex and Blotter realize one of their new charges, Anton, is going to be a handful. With the tendency to wander off into the woods talking to himself, Alex and Blotter think the shy kid just has an imaginary friend. But when Anton starts talking about "the Tall Man" and communicating cryptic messages to them, they begin to wonder what lurks in the woods around Stillwater. Meanwhile, flashbacks show how Alex got his "if you want something in life, you have to take it" attitude.
3	"Mix Tape"	Mick Garris	Edward Kitsis & Adam Horowitz	July 12, 2016	0.48
The summer is off to a rough start for the counselors at Camp Stillwater and a night away in town is a much-needed break. Both Cricket and Jessie see the free time as an opportunity to make headway with their crushes, but when one of them goes a little too far the evening takes a dangerous turn. Stuck covering the campers while the rest are in town, Blair and Joel use movie night as a way to make their own romantic overtures. Meanwhile, flashbacks show why Cricket's plans to attract Alex's attention include insulting graffiti.
4	"Modern Love"	Tara Nicole Weyr	Edward Kitsis & Adam Horowitz	July 19, 2016	0.46
With a string of unfortunate events plaguing the start of the summer at Camp Stillwater, Deb decides to push up the masquerade ball to try and revitalize the morale. But as the campers begin the preparations for the ball, the counselors start to compare notes of the strange occurrences they have encountered. With too many weird things taking place to be a coincidence, Alex, Cricket and Amy are determined to get to the bottom of what is happening. As their investigation turns towards Deb, Joel finds himself in a tricky situation. Meanwhile, flashbacks feature Drew being haunted by his past as Andrea Dalton, the girl he was born as.
5	"How to Stay Alive in the Woods"	Norman Buckley	Erin Maher & Kay Reindl	July 26, 2016	0.35
Tension grows at the camp when Deb has planned an overnight camp in the backwoods. Joel reveals he had a brother named Michael, but he committed suicide on prom night after claiming that "the Tall Man never leaves him alone". Now at camp, Joel starts to see the Tall Man in the woods telling him to kill Amy or someone else will die. Joel becomes paranoid of his past and tries to protect Amy and everyone else on the overnight. Meanwhile, Cricket catches the eyes of Alex, as he starts to realize that he has feelings for her asks her out on a blood moon date. Eventually, Joel reveals his past to everyone and identifies the Tall Man as Holyoke. Later, Cricket is killed by a masked figure, who pushes her into a bear trap.
6	"The Dharma Bums"	Michael Schultz	Richard Hatem	August 2, 2016	0.53
Everyone is shaken by the latest dark events that have transpired at Camp Stillwater. No longer able to ignore that something seriously wrong is happening, some of the counselors decide to take drastic measures to get answers. Also searching for answers, Deputy Sykes gets a tip from the past that he may be on the right path. Meanwhile, flashbacks feature Deb.
7	"Townie"	Mairzee Almas	Ian Goldberg & Richard Hatem	August 9, 2016	0.41
As the counselors and Deputy Sykes put together the pieces of what is happening at Camp Stillwater, Sykes knows that something has to be done to stop it. With the help of Deb and the counselors, he comes up with a plan that will hopefully end the attacks before someone else gets hurt. Meanwhile, flashbacks feature Deputy Garrett Sykes.
8	"The Devil Inside"	Mick Garris	Richard Naing & Steven Canals	August 16, 2016	0.47
As Deb, Deputy Sykes and the counselors all try to come to grips with what took place at Camp Stillwater, a sense of calm finally comes over the camp. Jessie begins to have visions of Cricket and Damon, while trying to recover Holyoke's bones to throw them in the lake. Meanwhile, Flashbacks feature Jessie.
9	"Home Sweet Home"	Alrick Riley	Ian Goldberg	August 23, 2016	0.36
Jessie and Sykes are trying to figure out who the bad guy is. Meanwhile, Blair and Drew try to take the kids home on the bus. Deb goes to the cabin and finds Blotter inside tied up and gagged. She thinks that Sykes did it and says she has to stop him. Deb leaves and is running thinking that it's Sykes. Amy confronts her and stabs her to death, and then Blotter. It's also revealed that she intentionally let go of Margot while she was dangling from the roof, because only one position was left in the camp, and that she killed her family following a prank pulled by her brother in the garage. It is revealed that Malphas does not want an innocent soul, but a pure evil one, and Amy has been the perfect vessel for the demon since she arrived at Camp Stillwater.
10	"She Talks to Angels"	Steve Miner	Edward Kitsis & Adam Horowitz	August 30, 2016	0.41
Amy reveals her true self to Garrett and Jesse. Anton warns Drew and Blair that they should return to the camp because their friends need their help. Garett sacrifices himself, but his spirit helps the survivors defeat the demon inside Amy.

== Production ==
=== Development ===
Dead of Summer was ordered to series on November 18, 2015, along with an announcement that ABC Family would be transforming into Freeform in January 2016. The show is a reunion for Once Upon a Time creators Edward Kitsis and Adam Horowitz and one-time-writer Ian B. Goldberg. In February 2016, it was reported that Lost and Once Upon a Time stars Elizabeth Mitchell and Elizabeth Lail would headline the show, initiating another reunion between writers and cast. In April 2016, Freeform announced that the series would premiere on June 28, 2016.

On November 8, 2016, Freeform cancelled the series after one season. The series would have set its second season in 1970, with a third season to be set in the early 2000s.

=== Filming ===
The series began principal photography on March 21, 2016, in Vancouver, British Columbia. Horowitz directed the pilot episode, only his second episode of television as director.

== Reception ==
Dead of Summer has initially received mixed reviews from television critics. The review aggregator website Rotten Tomatoes reported a 63% approval rating, with an average rating of 6.05 out of 10, based on 16 reviews. The website's critical consensus reads, "Dead of Summer sets a spooky stage for a silly period creepfest, but its lack of actual scares adds up to an altogether underwhelming experience."

Molly Freeman of ScreenRant gave the series premiere a positive review stating, "While the premise of Dead of Summer sounds familiar to any horror movie fan, the show benefits from not being directly tied to an existing horror franchise since it won't suffer for being compared to movies beloved by generations." Sonia Saraiya of Variety also wrote a positive review: "Dead of Summer makes for a schlocky hour that never quite gets boring. At the very least, while escaping the dog days of summer inside with the air-conditioning, there's plenty of fun to be had in laughing at how bad it is."

Alex McGown of The A.V. Club gave the first episode a C rating, stating "Its story is so clunky, and characters so wafer-thin, it all but evaporates into a haze of trite jump-scare beats and hoary teen tropes." Dan Fienberg of The Hollywood Reporter gave a more negative review: "Dead of Summer is just run-of-the-mill unintentionally bad – a mishmash of genres and structures and stock characters that maybe aspires to something original and falls flat."

As the series continued, reviews became more positive. Paul Dailly of TV Fanatic gave a perfect score of 5.0/5.0 to the fifth episode saying, "'How to Stay Alive in the Woods' was a stellar episode of the freshman drama. We got so many reveals and the pace was brisk. Fingers crossed the rest of the season plays out in this manner."
