= Emergence (TV series) =

2019 American mystery-themed thriller television series

- Genre: Mystery-thriller; Drama; Science-fiction
- Created by: Michele Fazekas; Tara Butters
- Starring: Allison Tolman; Alexa Swinton; Owain Yeoman; Ashley Aufderheide; Robert Bailey Jr.; Zabryna Guevara; Donald Faison; Clancy Brown
- Music by: Blake Neely; Daniel James Chan
- Country of origin: United States
- Original language: English
- No. of seasons: 1
- No. of episodes: 13

Production
- Executive producers: Juan Alfonso; Paul McGuigan; Michele Fazekas; Tara Butters
- Producers: Holly Brix; Gail Barringer
- Cinematography: Shawn Maurer; Robert Humphreys
- Editors: William Yeh; L. Schroeder; Maura Corey; Andy Morrish; Hallie Faben Comfort
- Camera setup: Single-camera
- Running time: 42–43 minutes
- Production companies: Fazekas & Butters; ABC Studios

Original release
- Network: ABC
- Release: September 24, 2019 – January 28, 2020

Emergence is an American mystery-themed thriller television series created by Tara Butters and Michele Fazekas for ABC Studios. Originally intended to be produced as a potential series prospect for NBC after it had ordered a pilot, the hour-long program was picked up by ABC, which added it to its 2019–20 television schedule lineup, where it debuted on September 24, 2019, as a Tuesday night entry. The series received positive reviews from critics, but the series premiere's viewership did not do well, and the show was cancelled in May 2020.

== Premise ==
A police chief in Southold on Long Island's Peconic Bay takes in a young child who she finds near the site of a mysterious accident, but soon discovers that the girl has no memory of what has happened or who she is. The child's mystery becomes more intense than expected when the chief starts investigating the history that led up to the accident and the questions of how and why it happened, dating back 15 years. A series of bizarre electronic disruptions, unexplained forces and a strange cryptic symbol are also at play, all of which are related to the young girl.

== Cast ==
=== Main ===
- Allison Tolman as Jo Evans, a newly divorced police chief and mother to teenage daughter Mia, who takes in the mysterious young girl Piper and is determined to protect her from those who want the child. Out of concern for Piper, she covers up any details of her existence and events, eventually taking in the girl as her foster daughter.
- Alexa Swinton as Piper, a young girl with unique powers. She was the sole survivor of the plane crash, who Jo takes in and is the center of the mystery that is tied to her. She is later revealed to be an artificially intelligent gynoid who was part of a project involving placing artificial children with families. Piper is extremely dangerous and self-evolving, but at the same time wants to be loved and wanted. She is also the "blueprint" of Emily Cox when she was Piper's age, and soon discovered her true identity after her code was rewritten.
- Owain Yeoman as Benny Gallagher, a man claiming to be an investigative journalist who works for Reuters, and was investigating Augur Industries, the company involved in the conspiracy centered around Piper's existence, using his sources and contacts while acting as Jo's ally. He is concerned about Jo in regards to Piper, fearing that Jo's maternal instincts blind her to Piper's true nature. Benny is also found to have some startling similarities to Piper.
- Ashley Aufderheide as Mia Evans, Jo's daughter and Piper's foster sister, whom she bonds with, especially after learning of Piper's powers. She was originally named Bree in the pilot.
- Robert Bailey Jr. as Chris Minetto, a police officer under Jo, who conspires with her to keep the information about the events secret. He later learns about Piper after Jo tells him.
- Zabryna Guevara as Dr. Abby Fraiser, a pediatrician (with psychology expertise) and Jo's best friend.
- Donald Faison as Alex Evans, Jo's concerned ex-husband, Mia's father, and a civil engineer with a talent for deciphering and decoding information. He is laid off by new owner Augur Industries as revenge for Jo's investigation of the company and its owner Richard Kindred. He is fearful of Piper being around Mia after learning the truth from Jo, but soon comes to embrace her.
- Clancy Brown as Ed Sawyer, an ex-firefighter, Jo's father, and Mia's grandfather who is also battling cancer as a result of being a first responder involved in the September 11 attacks.

=== Recurring ===
- Terry O'Quinn as Richard Kindred, a ruthless multi-billionaire and head of Augur Industries, a tech firm with a mysterious and very secret agenda, who with Alan helped steal the AI technology that lead to the creation of Piper. He is revealed to be the estranged father of Emily Cox, who has him killed while he is in jail.
- Maria Dizzia as Emily Cox, an AI researcher at Augur Industries. Piper looks like her as a child, as she was her original creator using stolen technology. She is terrified of the consequences of Augur's experiments and reveals to Jo and Benny the truth about Piper. Jo keeps Emily "off the grid" by offering protection in exchange for helping her. It is later revealed that she is testing Piper and wants her for herself. She is the estranged, illegitimate daughter of Richard Kindred, but her obsession with Piper results in her having him killed while he is in jail. She is later taken into custody for Richard's murder, although she continued to help Jo, and later Helen.
- Seth Barrish as Alan Wilkis, a genetics engineer who faked his own death so no one could use his life's work, fearing that AIs would eventually make humanity extinct. He and Richard were responsible for stealing the AI technology that lead to Alan's disappearance. He is later revealed to be responsible for hiring a group of fixers trying to destroy the Augur buildings, only to be double crossed by its leader, Helen, an AI who kills him.
- Enver Gjokaj as Agent Ryan Brooks, an FBI agent who is also investigating Augur and of whom Jo is suspicious of because he seems to know almost everything regarding the case. When Jo tells him about the AIs, Ryan helps her despite having been taken off the case. He has fallen in love with Jo.
- Rowena King as Loretta, a British scientist who is later revealed as the creator of her lookalike, Helen, a former associate of Alan and leader of an armed group of fixers called "Splinter" who have been destroying evidence and places tied to the company. Helen slashed Alan's throat believing he double crossed her, and is later revealed to have similarities to Piper, after she arranged for her kidnapping with Benny's assistance. Loretta is determined to stop Helen from replicating Piper's power by any means necessary.
- Rowena King as Helen, an AI. She looks like her creator, Loretta.

=== Guest ===
- Gia Crovatin and Quincy Dunn-Baker as Caitlyn and Freddie Martin, who claim to be Piper's parents but turn out to be imposters hired to abduct her. They are both killed during a car chase; after which their bodies are reduced to blood in the morgue by Ken Lerner.
- Ptolemy Slocum as Ken Lerner, a fixer employed by Augur Industries who was assigned to retrieve and destroy evidence connected to Piper, such as the bodies of the Martins at the morgue. He is subsequently killed after he is captured and tells Jo about his employer.
- Nikki Massoud as Lily Salgado, a social worker who helped Jo get approved to become Piper's foster mother.
- Ashlie Atkinson as April, a contact of Benny's with a high level of expertise in cracking computer codes to get information (as she did with Lehman Brothers). However, she is wary of crossing potential enemies, even refusing to help Benny when she suspects he's in over his head. She is killed in a hit intended for him.
- Alexis Molnar as Gwen, April's daughter, who is also a contact of Benny and, like her mother, is a hacker.
- Tamara Tunie as Maria Wilkis, Alan's wife.
- Dana Wheeler-Nicholson as Vanessa Cox, the estranged mother of Emily Cox.

== Episodes ==
No.	Title	Directed by	Written by	Original release date	U.S. viewers (millions)
1	"Pilot"	Paul McGuigan	Michele Fazekas & Tara Butters	September 24, 2019	4.12
While investigating a plane crash, Southold Chief of Police Jo Evans finds a ten-year-old girl, who she takes to the hospital. Men claiming to be NTSB agents demand the girl be turned over to them, but disappear when Jo informs them NTSB does not have arrest authority. Suspicious, she takes the girl home with her; as she cannot remember anything, they jointly choose the name "Piper". The next day, Jo meets Benny Gallagher, a journalist investigating the crash. A couple arrives at the station claiming Piper is their missing daughter Olivia. Jo realizes they are lying, but they escape before she can detain them. Paranoid, she takes the family to their old beach home, where the Martins break in, grab Piper, and take off. Jo pursues them until their car flips over, killing them both but leaving Piper unharmed. Jo decides to keep custody of Piper while the kidnapping is investigated. Benny agrees to help Jo, as she can trust no one else. That night, while brushing her teeth, Piper removes an implant from under her ear and tosses it down the sink drain.
2	"Camera Wheelbarrow Tiger Pillow"	J. Miller Tobin	Chris Dingess & Lindsey Allen	October 1, 2019	3.58
Piper tells Jo a prowler is watching the house, prompting her to have Chris install a surveillance system. Jo and Benny visit a salvage contractor who was paid to dump the plane debris, and obtain a radio from the crash that transmits on a strange frequency. Abby gives Piper a diary; after she leaves, Piper's memories come into focus and she writes notes that she rips out. The stranger destroys several pieces of evidence linked to the crash and to Piper, then tracks the implant to the Evans' home; he discovers Piper, but flees when Jo arrives. Jo and Chris visit the yard where the Martins' vehicle is stored and see items levitating inside. The stranger arrives, and Jo subdues him with a sledgehammer drawn by an electromagnet in the car. Piper tells Jo she thinks she made the plane crash; Jo promises not to tell. Alex decides to stay at the house; Jo tells him she plans to shine a light on the forces working against her. Benny writes a false story about the crash. The vehicle is dumped in the sea near the plane debris. While scanning frequencies, Jo discovers a strange signal coming from the radio.
3	"2 MG CU BID"	Peter Leto	David H. Goodman	October 8, 2019	3.10
Piper falls ill. Leaving Alex to watch her, Jo goes to question the stranger, who identifies himself as Ken Lerner and informs her that the man who hired him is tech billionaire Richard Kindred. Through Benny, Jo tracks down Kindred at his company, Augur Industries, and tricks him into admitting that he made the technology recovered from the crash. While monitoring the signal, Alex notices Piper reciting a specific frequency and writes it down. Shortly thereafter, she collapses and is taken to the hospital. Lerner is killed when his morphine infuser is hacked. With Abby unable to treat Piper's condition, Jo has her administer doses of copper based on texts sent by an unknown number. Benny helps her find the source, an Augur researcher named Emily, who agrees to help them break into an offsite facility to recover the cure, which turns out to be a small disc. Based on Emily's hasty explanation, Jo realizes Piper is an android; when the disc is installed in her arm, she is instantly healed. Alex gives Jo the frequency and returns to his own home as Jo looks at Piper with fear in her eyes.
4	"No Outlet"	Alex Pillai	Jerome Schwartz	October 15, 2019	2.71
Jo takes Benny to go question Emily, but she refuses her offers of protection and flees. Benny swipes a hard drive from her possessions and takes it to one of his contacts, April, to be decoded. Jo also agrees to meet with Kindred for answers, but leaves when he threatens her. A social worker visits the house to determine whether or not Jo should be allowed to foster Piper, who becomes fearful that Jo doesn't want her anymore. Emily turns herself in and Chris is assigned to put her in protective custody. Based on coordinates provided by Alex, Jo and Benny find a deserted neighborhood where Piper had been secretly "raised" by Augur Industries. April sends Benny a video of Piper using her powers to kill the two people assigned to care for her, which he interprets as proof that Jo should consider returning Piper to Kindred's custody. Piper runs away, but Mia finds her and takes her to Alex's apartment. Later that night, Jo takes Piper for a drive, during which Piper saves a turtle from being run over. Realizing that she can help Piper learn to be better, Jo decides to foster her. While meeting with April, Benny is shot at by an assassin.
5	"RDZ9021"	Patricia Cardoso	Brant Englestein	October 29, 2019	2.60
April is killed, but a wounded Benny manages to reach Jo's house, where Ed and Abby patch him up. Blaming himself for his friend's death, Benny has April's daughter Gwen track the killer. Jo arrests Kindred in connection with the hit, but the evidence against him is altered and the DA forces her to release him. Kindred subsequently retaliates by buying out Alex's company and having him laid off. Ed discovers that his cancer has returned, but decides not to tell his family. Gwen finds the hitman's apartment, Benny steals his keys, and Jo obtains a search warrant; Benny's laptop and the drive are found to be destroyed, but the police find a list of names that leads them to Alan Wilkis, Kindred's deceased business partner. Emily hacks the law firm retained by Augur and finds an unsigned contract that suggests Kindred killed his partner to obtain his shares in the company, giving Jo a new lead. While driving Piper and Mia, Ed passes out and Piper uses her powers to avert a crash. Ed then tells Jo that he won't seek further treatment for his condition. Kindred contacts Piper through an AI construct and says they will get to know each other soon.
6	"Mile Marker 14"	Sydney Freeland	Nick Parker	November 5, 2019	3.42
Jo and Chris visit Alan's widow, Maria, to learn more about his death. However, Chris discovers Alan is actually alive. Before meeting with Alan, Jo tells Chris the truth about Piper and he is stunned. Alan leaves messages for Jo and Benny as they try to meet him, finally knocking them out by hypersonics and taking them to an undisclosed location. Alan explains to Jo and Benny that he didn't create Piper; he had his work destroyed because Piper became self-evolving and dangerous. He gives Jo information to convict Kindred. Kindred is arrested for wire fraud, and Jo allows Emily to go free. Ed stands by his decision to not resume chemotherapy treatment. Mia is injured while video-recording Piper's powers. When Alex discovers the video, he confronts Jo and takes Mia with him, upsetting Piper. Piper returns to the AI dream construct and is confronted by Kindred. She knows Kindred is an illusion. Emily reveals herself, claiming Piper passed the test.
7	"Fatal Exception"	Christopher Misiano	Holly Brix	November 19, 2019	2.30
Emily attempts to get Piper to love her, but is rejected, leading Emily to kidnap Alan, and has Maria held hostage. Jo is still upset over Alex taking Mia, who isn't happy about being separated. Jo learns Piper had visions of seeing Emily, leading Jo to suspect Emily is using her and Benny. Jo learns that Richard and Emily are father and daughter, but Richard is hesitant to help her. Emily has Alan create a new code that'll allow Emily to control Piper, which successfully takes over her using Jo's algorithms. Chris catches on to Maria immediately and chases the gunman away, and tracks Alan to a ferry terminal near his mansion where Jo and Chris rescue him. Jo has Benny keep Ed company, but Ed is suspicious of him. Emily succeeds in controlling Piper by using the algorithm so she can "see" her as Jo, and arrived to take Piper by force, leading to a confrontation with Alex and Mia. Jo reasons with Alan to erase the algorithm but can't override it, leading Jo to use her gun to destroy the servers, resulting in Piper returning to normal and Emily escaping. As Jo assures everyone that Piper is safe, Richard receives a phone call from Emily telling him she failed, but after she hangs up he is killed by a minion posing as a guard, on orders from Emily.
8	"American Chestnut"	Jessica Lowrey	Lindsey Allen	November 26, 2019	2.33
Jo tackles with Piper, Mia's 15th birthday, finding Emily, and Alex. Jo and Abby meet FBI agent Ryan Brooks, who is investigating Richard's death, which stuns Benny and Alan, who also tells Jo that Piper has rewritten her code. When Jo and Chris return to Augur, Ryan shows up as well, and they discover part of the building blown apart. Jo is suspicious of the FBI's actions, prompting her to alert Benny and take Alan out of town; when Benny's car hits a flat, Alan knocks Benny out. Piper asks Alex to take her to the home where she caused the damage because she was scared, but when they return Alex can't answer the truth to Piper. Ryan tells Jo she found Emily's mother, Vanessa Cox, who hasn't spoken to Emily in 20 years. When Vanessa shows Jo photos, she kept a 1988 picture of a 10 year old Emily, who is actually the "blueprint" of Piper. Jo then finds a building and discovers Emily and places her in handcuffs to keep her from talking, only to find a group of fixers showing up. Emily creates a diversion that allows the ladies to escape just in time for the place to blow up, and for Ryan to show up at the last minute to take Emily in custody. As Jo and Alex come to terms, Piper uses an upload disc and begins to glow, surprising everyone. Alan is confronted by a woman named Helen, who states that he took something that didn't belong to him and kills him.
9	"Where You Belong"	Paul McGuigan	Kendra Chanae Chapman	December 10, 2019	2.74
Jo has come to the realization that Piper rewrote her code. The family and Abby learn the whole truth about Piper. Chris tells Jo and Benny that a cyberterrorist group called Splinter is responsible for the explosions. Helen, who manages to clean up any traces of the now-dead Alan, approaches Ed for a clinical trial - but there's a catch: Ed informs Jo that he'll get the treatment in exchange for Piper, making Jo furious. Alex however calls Helen later and agrees to talk, where she explains that Piper was stolen from them. Benny isn't happy about Ryan's involvement, and when he learns about Piper from Emily, Ryan attempts to interrogate Jo but she turns the tables into making a deal with Alex to capture Helen. At the waterfront Helen instructs Alex to get out but Helen is on to the setup and escapes capture. At the station, everyone learns that Benny double crossed them by taking Piper. At an undisclosed location, Benny brings Piper to meet Helen and places a bracelet on her to rein in her powers; it is revealed that Benny and Helen both glow – albeit in a different color – like Piper.
10	"15 Years"	Leslie Hope	Brant Englestein & David H. Goodman	January 7, 2020	2.28
A month after Piper's disappearance, Jo and Ryan continue their search for Benny, piecing together that Benny's records only go back fifteen years, which is as long as Splinter has been active. When a disruption in the television shows Jo a familiar symbol, she believes it is a message from Piper. The disruption is tracked to a destroyed satellite, leading Jo and Ryan to Pennsylvania, where they confront the owner of the gas station who panics and flees. He is hit by a car and he begins to glow and flicker before escaping. Chris becomes suspicious of a vessel at the docks. He tells Alex about a device they were loading. Alex thinks it's a magnetic item and they discover a copper substance. Chris tells Alex he left his phone on the vessel as a tracker. Ryan is floored by learning from Jo that Benny, Piper and the gas station owner are AIs, leading Jo to learn they have been among humans for 15 years. The two track the owner to an animal hospital, where Jo takes an implant after he dies. Ed uses a ham radio to help Mia contact Piper, and get a message. Jo and Ryan track Piper and Benny to a farm, where Jo confronts Benny, but he disarms her. Jo then discovers that Piper has sided with Benny and Helen; and Piper, saying they need her, prevents Jo from following them.
11	"Applied Sciences"	J. Miller Tobin	Jerome Schwartz & Nick Parker	January 14, 2020	2.13
Helen visits a Al/father who just sent his family off on a vacation, but she kills him and takes a implant from under his neck after he refused to join her. Back in Southhold, Jo and Ryan show Abby the body of Charlie, and tell the family about Piper's status. While Mia shows Jo the binary message she received, Alex is concerned that Jo believes they changed Piper. Emily is later brought by Ryan to see Jo, and she agrees to help them. Emily examines the body and puts two and two together as Charlie also acts as a computer. Francis, a college buddy of Alex, tells him and Chris about the object they found, and later on entice Alex with a new job offer. Piper is concerned about Benny and how they lied to Jo, but keep that conversation from Helen, who tells Piper that her gifts are very important for a mission. Emily tells Jo that her brain is the only way she can communicate with Piper; Jo reluctantly risks it and she enters a virtual place where she meets Piper, but Helen's interferences push Jo out. Emily, convinced that Piper is still linked to Jo, traces the binary message as Helen, Benny, and Piper arrive to a facility to retrieve an item. When Piper witness Helen kill a AI guard, Helen turns the tables on Piper to blame her, prompting Piper to cage Helen and she and Benny leave. Piper convinces Benny to change, but resists and locks her in the trunk; Jo rescues her, only to have Benny pull a gun on Jo; but his instincts weakens him and he gives in and is placed in custody by Chris. Alex breaks the news to Jo that he might accept the job. While driving back to prison, Emily and Ryan run into an ambush from Splinter, and as they shoot Ryan, Emily comes face to face with Helen.
12	"Killshot Pt. 1"	Craig Zisk	Joey Siara	January 21, 2020	1.98
An uneasy alliance between Emily and Helen begins, but Helen adds an incentive (her assistant Justin) and a threat. Jo becomes more concerned about Ryan while at the same time can't trust Benny, who confesses to her about Helen planning to acquire a device that could make her more powerful than Piper. Abby alerts Jo at the hospital about Ryan and hides him from the FBI. Ryan believe Helen took him to the hospital. However, after talking to Benny about Helen and the bracelet on Piper, Ryan decides to turn himself back in to FBI, and gives Jo a kiss before saying goodbye. Piper is freed from the bracelet by Jo. A DOJ agent takes over the case, then closes it and clears Ryan immediately, but suddenly he's being followed and tells Jo they know everything. The two set a trap and confront the follower, who is revealed to be Loretta, the original creator of Helen. Loretta explains that 18 years earlier that a project she worked on was destroyed, and Helen is pulling all the stops to achieve absolute control. Emily challenges Justin to use his mind, and it causes the copper object to create a upload that affects Benny and Piper. They trace the device to Plum Island via Chris's phone. The plan works but the escape plan between Emily and Justin takes a twisted turn with Emily escaping and Justin ending up back with and killed by Helen. As Jo and Ryan head to the island, they confront Helen but her newfound powers prove too much and are trapped with the object Jo swiped and Helen wants back; Piper convincingly asks Alex to help her and get Benny before it's too late.
13	"Killshot Pt. 2"	Paul McGuigan	Michele Fazekas & Tara Butters	January 28, 2020	1.89
As Jo and Brooks continue to evade Helen, Piper and Alex convince Chris to get Benny. Helen's upgrade is making Jo and Ryan's escape more difficult as an AI bug infects Jo, forcing him to cut it out. After reuniting with Piper and the others, they take refuge in an isolated room. Back at home, the DOJ face Ed with a search warrant to retrieve the exabyte. Benny sneaks out with the killshot. Jo goes after him and sees him trying to alter the computer banks. She holds a gun on him but suddenly relents allowing him to finish. Hiding from Helen, she witnesses Helen killing Benny after the killshot fails. Posing as Jo, Helen attacks Ryan and Alex and steals the disk. Piper confronts Helen who uses the source to upgrade, but Jo uses the bracelet to weaken Helen. The source grows bigger and Piper sacrifices herself to contain it. The DOJ agents find the envelope in Jo's safe, but it only contains Mia's necklace. Mia realizes that Piper was never coming back. Alex suggests using the disk on Helen and it works; she returns as Piper. At home, Piper tells Ed she can find a cure for him. Jo is heartbroken when Ryan decides to let her go on with her life, while Alex tells Jo he'll take the job offer. Loretta reveals to the agent that Helen is "in" Piper's body, and uses a device to wake her up.

== Production ==
=== Development ===
On January 11, 2019, it was announced that NBC had given Emergence a pilot order. The pilot was written by Tara Butters and Michele Fazekas, who executive produced alongside Paul McGuigan and Robert Atwood. Production companies involved with the pilot included Fazekas & Butters and ABC Studios. Parts of the pilot were filmed at Kearny Point, in Kearny New Jersey. After the pilot was completed, NBC declined to pick up the project; however, ABC ordered it to series on May 11, 2019. A day after that, it was announced that the series would premiere in the fall of 2019 and air on Tuesdays at 10:00 P.M.

=== Casting ===
In February 2019, it was announced that Allison Tolman and Alexa Skye Swinton had been cast in the pilot's lead roles. Alongside the pilot's order announcement, in March 2019 it was reported that Owain Yeoman, Donald Faison, and Zabryna Guevara had joined the cast. On August 19, 2019, it was announced that Terry O'Quinn would join the cast in a recurring role as Richard Kindred, starting with the third episode.

== Release ==
On May 14, 2019, ABC released the first official trailer for the series. It featured the song "Hush (feat. Garrison Starr)" by Seibold. On August 27, 2019, a 10-minute preview was made available for viewing on its official website, YouTube, and Facebook accounts. The preview also gave viewers keys to a series of clues leading up to the storyline, as reflected in the names of the episode titles.

== Reception ==
=== Critical response ===
The review aggregator website Rotten Tomatoes reported a 94% approval rating with an average rating of 7.2/10, based on 34 reviews. The website's critical consensus reads, "Led by an outstanding Allison Tolman, Emergence avoids becoming just another mystery-box mess with strongly-written characters that will keep viewers caring no matter the resolution." Metacritic, which uses a weighted average, assigned a score of 69 out of 100 based on 14 critics, indicating "generally favorable reviews".

Los Angeles Times reviewer Robert Lloyd notes the "not unfamiliar" premise comparisons to other media, such as series Believe, Stranger Things and the films Firestarter and even E.T. the Extra-Terrestrial. What makes Emergence different, notes Lloyd, is Allison Tolman's ability to "fill the screen with thought" and almost single-handedly transform Emergence "from a decent genre show into something richer." Subsequently, Lloyd picked the program as one of the best new shows on television in his 2019 year-end review.

=== Ratings ===
Viewership and ratings per episode of Emergence
No.	Title	Air date	Rating/share (18–49)	Viewers (millions)	DVR (18–49)	DVR viewers (millions)	Total (18–49)	Total viewers (millions)
1	"Pilot"	September 24, 2019	0.8/5	4.12	0.8	4.31	1.6	8.44
2	"Camera Wheelbarrow Tiger Pillow"	October 1, 2019	0.6/4	3.58	0.7	3.75	1.3	7.32
3	"2 MG CU BID"	October 8, 2019	0.5/3	3.10	0.6	3.25	1.1	6.35
4	"No Outlet"	October 15, 2019	0.5/3	2.71	0.6	3.27	1.1	5.98
5	"RDZ9021"	October 29, 2019	0.5/3	2.60	0.5	2.94	1.0	5.55
6	"Mile Marker 14"	November 5, 2019	0.7/4	3.42	0.5	2.89	1.2	6.31
7	"Fatal Exception"	November 19, 2019	0.4/3	2.30	0.4	2.78	0.8	5.09
8	"American Chestnut"	November 26, 2019	0.4/3	2.33	0.4	2.70	0.9	5.02
9	"Where You Belong"	December 10, 2019	0.4/2	2.74	0.4	2.41	0.8	5.16
10	"15 Years"	January 7, 2020	0.5/3	2.28	0.4	2.65	0.9	4.93
11	"Applied Sciences"	January 14, 2020	0.3/2	2.13	0.3	2.48	0.7	4.61
12	"Killshot Pt. 1"	January 21, 2020	0.3/2	1.98	0.4	2.58	0.7	4.56
13	"Killshot Pt. 2"	January 28, 2020	0.3/2	1.89	0.4	2.49	0.6	4.38

== See also ==
- A for Andromeda
