= Infinitely Polar Bear =

2014 film

- Theatrical release poster
- Directed by: Maya Forbes
- Written by: Maya Forbes
- Produced by: Wallace Wolodarsky; Benji Kohn; Bingo Gubelmann; Sam Bisbee; Galt Niederhoffer
- Starring: Mark Ruffalo; Zoe Saldana; Imogene Wolodarsky; Ashley Aufderheide
- Cinematography: Bobby Bukowski
- Edited by: Michael R. Miller
- Music by: Theodore Shapiro
- Production companies: Paper Street Films; Park Pictures; Bad Robot; KGB Media
- Distributed by: Sony Pictures Classics
- Release dates: January 18, 2014 (Sundance Film Festival); June 19, 2015 (United States)
- Running time: 90 minutes
- Country: United States
- Language: English
- Budget: $6.7 million
- Box office: $2.1 million

Infinitely Polar Bear is a 2014 American comedy-drama film written and directed by Maya Forbes, and starring Mark Ruffalo, Zoe Saldaña, Imogene Wolodarsky, and Ashley Aufderheide. The film premiered in competition at the 30th Sundance Film Festival on January 18, 2014. The film was released on June 19, 2015, by Sony Pictures Classics.

== Plot ==
In the late 1970s, Cameron Stuart is a Bostonian diagnosed with bipolar disorder. He has had a psychotic break, which has caused him to be hospitalized and also fired from his job. Cam's wife Maggie subsequently struggles financially and moves to a small rent-controlled apartment with their two young children.

As Cameron is rehabilitated, he moves from a halfway house out on his own. Maggie begins to apply to business schools so the family will eventually become more financially secure, for the sake of the children who are attending a third-rate school in a bad part of town. Maggie manages to obtain a scholarship to attend Columbia University, and she asks Cameron to take care of their daughters while she moves to New York for eighteen months in order to obtain her M.B.A. degree. Cameron reluctantly agrees.

The girls are embarrassed to live with Cameron, who sometimes abandons them in the middle of the night, is overly-friendly with their neighbors, and starts countless messy projects which he abandons, making their apartment nearly unlivable. However, his daughters love Cameron deeply and try to help him raise them.

Cameron takes them to visit his grandmother, a wealthy Boston Brahmin who controls the family trust, and who pays the cost of their rent-controlled apartment. After his grandmother tries to give Cameron her Bentley, he asks her to instead pay for the girls to be privately educated, but she refuses.

Maggie begins to near graduation, which Cameron hopes will enable them to live as a family once more. However, he reveals to Maggie that he has been off his lithium since she left, and Maggie is unable to find a suitable job in Boston. Maggie decides to take a job she has been offered at E. F. Hutton & Co. in New York City, leaving Cameron behind in Boston, and taking the girls with her.

Seeing how unhappy the girls will be, and realizing that her new demanding job will force her to work upwards of twelve hours a day, Maggie decides that, although she will accept the job, she will leave the children in Boston with Cameron, sending money back, so that the girls will be able to attend a good private school. A year later, the girls are enrolled in private school, and Cameron continues to take care of them and watch them proudly.

== Cast ==
- Mark Ruffalo as Cam Stuart
- Zoe Saldana as Maggie Stuart
- Imogene Wolodarsky as Amelia Stuart
- Ashley Aufderheide as Faith Stuart
- Keir Dullea as Murray Stuart
- Beth Dixon as Pauline Stuart
- Muriel Gould as Gaga
- Paul Elias as Dick
- Scott Mildenhall as Grizzly

== Production ==
Amelia Stuart is a fictionalized version of Forbes. Although some people questioned whether Wolodarsky (who had no previous professional acting experience) would be right for the role, Forbes was certain, particularly after seeing her daughter audition with Ruffalo and Saldana.

Forbes told a reporter for USA Today that it was an advantage having her own daughter, Imogene Wolodarsky, play one of the starring roles: "I could make her cry. And I didn't have to worry 'What if I damage this kid forever.' Imogene's part is so demanding because of all the emotional stuff. I would go into a corner with her and I would cry about what the scene was about and tell her why I was crying and what it meant and she'd cry and then we'd go do the scene. She has such a huge heart."

The shooting of the film began on April 9, 2013 in Providence, Rhode Island.

J. J. Abrams and Bryan Burk served as executive producers of the film.

== Release ==
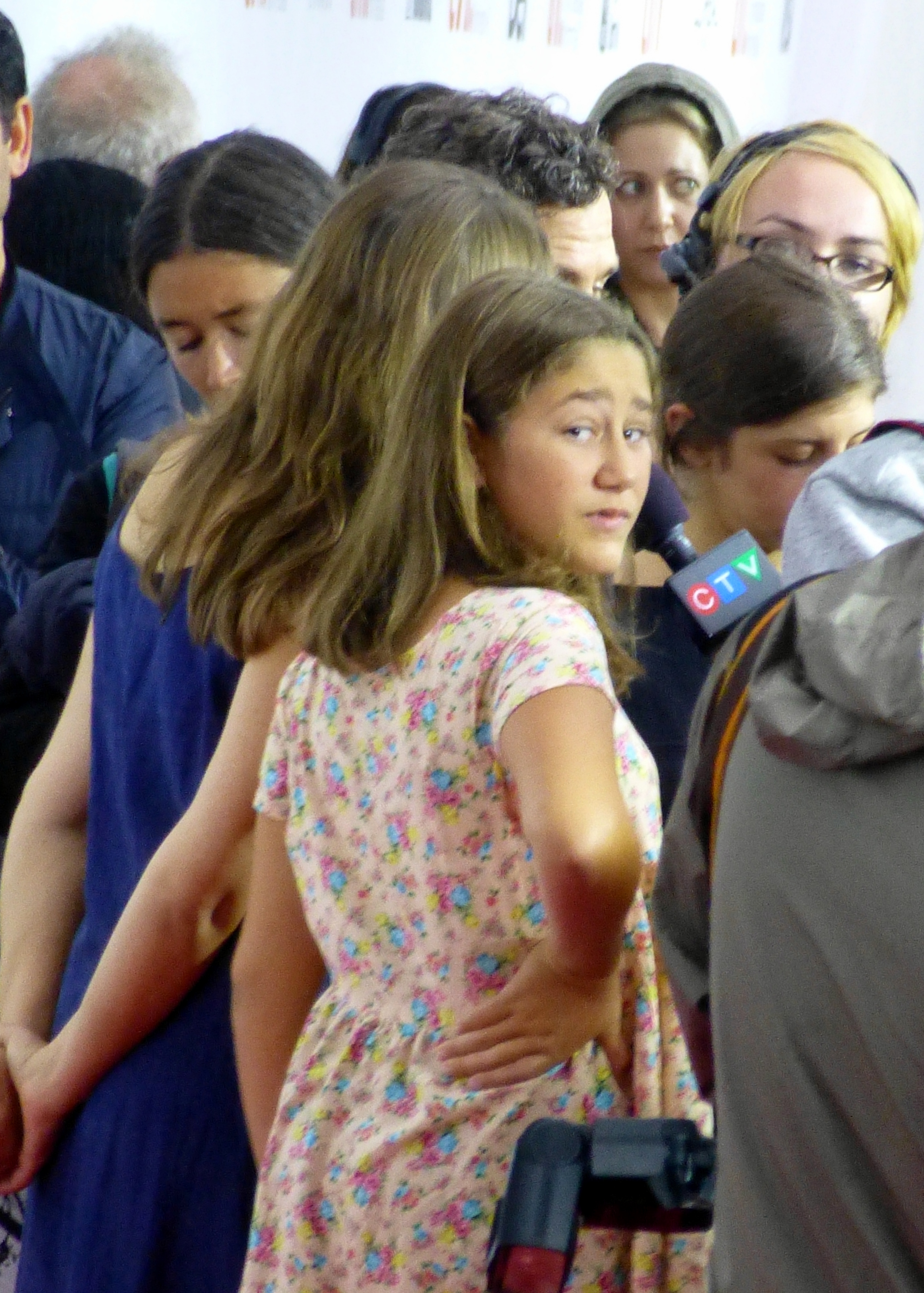
Imogene Wolodarsky at the film's premiere at the 39th Toronto International Film Festival

After premiering at Sundance, the film was acquired by Sony Pictures Classics for North America, the United Kingdom, Ireland, Germany, Austria, Scandinavia, Eastern Europe and Russia.

The film has played at several film festivals including the Deauville American Film Festival, the Toronto International Film Festival, and the Vancouver International Film Festival. The film was released on June 19, 2015, by Sony Pictures Classics.

=== Reception ===
On review aggregator Rotten Tomatoes, the film holds an approval rating of 81% based on 118 reviews, with an average rating of 6.72/10. The website's critics consensus reads: "Infinitely Polar Bear handles its thorny themes with a somewhat troublesomely light touch, but Mark Ruffalo's complex performance keeps the drama solidly grounded." On Metacritic, the film has a weighted average score of 64 out of 100, based on 32 critics, indicating "generally favorable" reviews.

The film also earned Mark Ruffalo a nomination for the Golden Globe Award for Best Actor - Motion Picture Musical or Comedy.

=== Accolades ===
Award	Category	Recipient	Result
73rd Golden Globe Awards	Best Actor – Comedy or Musical	Mark Ruffalo	Nominated

=== Home media ===
Infinitely Polar Bear was released on DVD & Blu-ray on January 5, 2016.
