= South of Hell (TV series) =

- Genre: Supernatural horror; Drama
- Created by: Matt Lambert
- Starring: Mena Suvari; Zachary Booth; Lamman Rucker; Paulina Singer; Drew Moerlein; Lauren Luna Veléz; Bill Irwin
- Opening theme: Cross My Heart Hope To Die – "Wild Side"
- Country of origin: United States
- Original language: English
- No. of seasons: 1
- No. of episodes: 8

Production
- Executive producers: Eli Roth; Eugene Stein; Stewart Till; Erica Motley; Jason Blum; Gerard Bocaccio
- Camera setup: Single-camera
- Production company: Blumhouse Television

Original release
- Network: WE tv
- Release: November 27, 2015

South of Hell is a 2015 American supernatural horror drama television series starring Mena Suvari. The series was ordered by WE tv with a straight eight-episode pick up in 2014, but after a change of AMC Networks personnel and a shift back towards reality television programming, the network burned off seven of its eight episodes all on one day on November 27, 2015 (that year's Black Friday); the eighth was made available exclusively at the time through the iTunes Store. Several feature directors, including Ti West, Rachel Talalay, Jennifer Lynch and Jeremiah S. Chechik, directed individual episodes, along with executive producer Eli Roth, who directed the pilot. The series is currently available in full through digital retailers, along with several ad-supported video on demand providers.

== Premise ==
In Charleston, South Carolina, Maria and David Abascal are demon hunters for hire. In Maria's body resides a demon called Abigail, who feeds off the evil that Maria exorcises from others. As Maria does her job of vanquishing evil, she must find a way to exorcise Abigail out of her body. But getting rid of Abigail is not an easy task, as the demon finds it immensely appealing to reside deep within a conflicted soul such as Maria's.

== Cast ==
Sources:

- Mena Suvari as Maria Abascal, a demon-hunter-for-hire
- Zachary Booth as David Abascal, Maria's brother
- Bill Irwin as Enos Abascal, Maria and David's father and cult leader
- Drew Moerlein as Dusty, Maria's ex-military neighbor and local handyman
- Lamman Rucker as Rev. Elijah Bledsoe, a minister
- Paulina Singer as Grace, Reverend Bledsoe's daughter
- Lydia Hearst as Charlotte Roberts
- Slate Holmgren as Sweetmouth, the local drug dealer
- Lauren Velez as Tetra, a spiritual informant
- Annapurna Sriram as Diversi-Tay

== Reception ==
South of Hell received negative reviews on Metacritic and has a 0% approval rating on Rotten Tomatoes. The Hollywood Reporter said the premise had potential, but the show is only enjoyable as "so-bad-it's-funny silliness". Likewise, The A.V. Club called it "an everlasting slog" with unintentionally funny action sequences. Bloody Disgusting found the premise more interesting than the execution, though they said it may pick up viewers who liked Supernatural.

== Episodes ==
No.	Title	Directed by	Written by	Original release date	US viewers (millions)
1	"Demons Are Forever"	Eli Roth	Matt Lambert	November 27, 2015	0.122
2	"Judge and Fury"	Rachel Talalay	Matt Lambert & Jacob Epstein	November 27, 2015	0.122
3	"I See You"	Jennifer Lynch	Kiersten Van Horne	November 27, 2015	N/A
4	"White Noise"	Rachel Talalay	John E. Deaver & William S. Walker	November 27, 2015	N/A
5	"The One That Got Away"	Jennifer Lynch	Jessica Brickman	November 27, 2015	N/A
6	"South of the Border"	Jeremiah S. Chechik	Matt Lambert & Jacob Epstein	November 27, 2015	N/A
7	"Take Life Now"	Ti West	Matt Lambert & Jacob Epstein	November 27, 2015	N/A
8	"Blood Relations"	Jeremiah S. Chechik	Matt Lambert & Jacob Epstein	November 27, 2015	N/A
