= That '90s Show =

2023 American television period sitcom

- Season 1 promotional post
- Genre: Teen sitcom
- Based on: That '70s Show by: Bonnie and Terry Turner; Mark Brazill
- Developed by: Bonnie Turner; Terry Turner; Lindsey Turner; Gregg Mettler
- Showrunner: Gregg Mettler
- Directed by: Gail Mancuso; Laura Prepon
- Starring: Debra Jo Rupp; Kurtwood Smith; Callie Haverda; Ashley Aufderheide; Mace Coronel; Reyn Doi; Sam Morelos; Maxwell Acee Donovan
- Music by: James Iha
- Opening theme: "That '70s Song" by Brett Anderson
- Country of origin: United States
- Original language: English
- No. of seasons: 3
- No. of episodes: 26

Production
- Executive producers: Marcy Carsey; Tom Werner; Gregg Mettler; Bonnie Turner; Terry Turner; Lindsey Turner; Debra Jo Rupp; Kurtwood Smith; Chrissy Pietrosh; Jessica Goldstein; Gail Mancuso; Mandy Summers
- Producers: Steve Sandoval; Kelly-Anne Lee
- Cinematography: Gary Baum
- Editors: Scott Ashby; Joseph Fulton
- Running time: 21–30 minutes
- Production companies: The Carsey-Werner Company; Ratamacue Productions, Inc.

Original release
- Network: Netflix
- Release: January 19, 2023 – August 22, 2024

Related
- That '70s Show

That '90s Show is an American teen sitcom that serves as the sequel to That '70s Show. Set during the summers of 1995 and 1996, featuring characters and locales that debuted in its predecessor, it debuted on Netflix on January 19, 2023. In February 2023, the series was renewed for a second season, with the first part of the season released on June 27, 2024, and the second part released on August 22, 2024. In October 2024, the series was canceled after an extended second season, though Kurtwood Smith confirmed that the show will potentially be shopped to other streaming platforms.

== Premise ==
The show centers on Leia Forman, the teenage daughter of Eric Forman and Donna Pinciotti, forming bonds with other teenagers as she spends the summer of 1995 with her grandparents Red and Kitty in Point Place, Wisconsin.

== Cast ==
=== Main ===
- Debra Jo Rupp as Kitty Forman, Leia's paternal grandmother and Eric's mother, who works as a nurse at the high school where the teens attend in Point Place
- Kurtwood Smith as Red Forman, Leia's paternal grandfather and Eric's father, known for his hard attitude
- Callie Haverda as Leia Forman, a smart, snarky teen girl who craves adventure, the daughter of Eric Forman and Donna Pinciotti from the original series, she is initially shy and inexperienced, but grows more adventurous over the summer
- Ashley Aufderheide as Gwen Runck, Nate Runck's rebellious Riot grrrl half-sister with a loyal heart, who lives next door to Kitty and Red, in Donna's old house from the original series
- Maxwell Acee Donovan as Nate Runck, Gwen Runck's more easygoing and goofy older half-brother, and Nikki Velasco's boyfriend who lives next door
- Sam Morelos as Nikki Velasco, Nate's ambitious and intelligent girlfriend
- Mace Coronel as Jay Kelso, a charming, flirty young son of Michael Kelso and Jackie Burkhart, Leia's love interest, and Betsy Kelso's half-brother
- Reyn Doi as Ozzie Takada, a computer whiz and the most perceptive yet cynical friend of the gang

=== Recurring ===
- Laura Prepon as Donna Pinciotti, Leia's mother, Eric's wife, and an author
- Wilmer Valderrama as Fez (season 1), a popular hair stylist and longtime friend of the Forman family, who dates Sherri
- Andrea Anders as Sherri Runck, the Formans' new neighbor, in Donna's old house, and Gwen and Nate's mother. She was in a relationship with Fez in season 1
- Don Stark as Bob Pinciotti (season 2; guest season 1), Leia's maternal grandfather and Donna's father
- Kevin Smith as Jason "Sonny" (season 2), Leo's son
- Jason Mewes as Bunch (season 2), Sonny's best friend and roommate
- Niles Fitch as Cole Carson (season 2), Gwen's ex-boyfriend
- Kira Kosarin as Betsy Kelso (season 2), Jay's half-sister and Michael's daughter from his previous relationship with Brooke in the original series.
- Raphael Alejandro as Isaac (season 2), Ozzie's boyfriend
- Anthony Turpel as Theo (season 2), Nikki's ex-boyfriend

=== Guest stars ===
- Topher Grace as Eric Forman (season 1), Leia's father, Donna's husband, and a college professor in Star Wars studies
- Mila Kunis as Jackie Burkhart (season 1), Jay's mother and Michael Kelso's 3-time wife
- Ashton Kutcher as Michael Kelso (season 1), Jay's father and Jackie's 3-time husband
- Tommy Chong as Leo Chingkwake, Point Place's local hippie who was friends with the original characters
- Brian Austin Green as Brian Austin Green (season 1), a fictionalized version of himself who reprised his Beverly Hills, 90210 role as David Silver in the Point Place, 53140 dream sequences that spoofed the series
- Jim Rash as Fenton, Fez's former landlord in the original series, now Sherri's landlord, who still harbors a dislike of Fez. Later he owns a pawnshop that Nikki's parents sold her guitar to.
- Lisa Loeb as herself (season 2), appears in Leia's daydream
- Seth Green as Mitch Miller (season 2), Eric's enemy who had a crush on Donna in the original show, now Gwen's boss at Hot Topic
- Carmen Electra as herself (season 2), appears in Kitty's daydream
- Will Forte as Kiefer (season 2), a healer Kitty consults with
- Wayne Knight as Bruce (season 2), a fellow patient Red befriends while he is in the hospital. Knight previously played an angel in the original series' fourth season premiere, “It's a Wonderful Life".
- Matt Rife as Travis (season 2), a germaphobic pilot Red and Kitty meet before their flight to Paris
- Mike "The Miz" Mizanin as The Party Animal (season 2), a professional wrestler
- Sherry Cola as Morgan (season 2)
- Cedric Yarbrough as Otis (season 2), Gwen's father
- David DeLuise as Judge Jezner (season 2), the judge who suspended Kitty's license
- Bob Clendenin as Earl (season 2), Red's former subordinate at Price Mart, who is now part of a men's support group

== Episodes ==
Series overview
Season	Part	Episodes		Originally released
1	1	10		January 19, 2023
2	2	16	8	June 27, 2024
2	3	16	8	August 22, 2024

=== Season 1 (2023) ===
No. overall	No. in season	Title	Directed by	Written by	Original release date
Part 1
1	1	"That '90s Pilot"	Gail Mancuso	Teleplay by : Gregg Mettler; Story by : Bonnie Turner & Terry Turner & Lindsey Turner & Gregg Mettler	January 19, 2023
Now as a married couple, Eric Forman and Donna Pinciotti visit Eric's parents for the Fourth of July weekend in 1995. Eric and Donna's daughter, Leia, meets Gwen, her next door neighbor who introduces her to her group of friends. After helping them get a tap to open a keg that Nate, Jay and Nikki got for free, she decides she wants to stay at Point Place for the summer. Eric initially refuses, but then he is convinced by Donna and allows her to stay. Kitty for one, is really excited to have a house full of kids again, while Red doesn't feel the same. Later, Michael Kelso and Jackie Burkhart pay Red and Kitty a visit, announcing they're remarrying for the second time and it's also revealed that Jay is their son, much to Red's displeasure.
2	2	"Free Leia"	Gail Mancuso	Chrissy Pietrosh & Jessica Goldstein	January 19, 2023
The kids find Eric's very old “Candyland Stash” of marijuana in a box of his stuff that Kitty gives them. They all get high and get the munchies and want Raisin Bran. Kitty suggests a movie night and takes Leia to Video Haven where Jay works. She sees that someone is renting a copy of Clerks and gets the renter’s address while Jay isn't looking. Kitty takes her there and it turns out to be Leo's house. Red and Kitty meet Sherri, the mother of two of the kids that Leia is hanging out with, Gwen and Nate. Sherri is single and Kitty tries to get her to dump her boyfriend who turns out to be Fez. She overhears them having sex while she is using their bathroom because her shower head is broken.
3	3	"Lip Smackers"	Gail Mancuso	Andrew Ti	January 19, 2023
Kitty and Red find out that Sherri is dating Fez. Leia wants to get her first kiss, so Gwen takes her to the mall. Nikki and Nate have to go to the urgent care because his lips had a reaction to her "Lip Smackers." Red buys a massage chair and gets so relaxed by it that he is actually in a good mood.
4	4	"Rave"	Gail Mancuso	Jake Lasker	January 19, 2023
Leia is somewhat obsessed with Jay because he didn't kiss her the other night. Jay gets convinced by Nikki and Nate that he didn't kiss her because he really does like her. Gwen and Ozzie make sure that Leia knows that Jay is a player. Leia and Jay decide that they are going to let the other make the first move so that the non first mover has the control in the relationship. The kids all go to a rave and forget to bring Ozzie. Jay tricks Leia into saying that she likes him first and they get mad at each other and dare each other to see who will be successful in picking someone up at the rave. Red tries to force Ozzie to talk but Kitty gets Ozzie to tell them the kids are at the rave by being nice to him. Red busts all the kids at the rave and brings them back to Point Place. Kitty grounds Leia for a week. Leia tricks Jay into saying that he likes her and she says that she just wants to be friends trying to get the control in the relationship.
5	5	"Step by Step"	Gail Mancuso	Erin Foley	January 19, 2023
Red and Kitty get their first computer and Ozzie helps them set it up. Jay's brain is getting short-circuited by his confusion over Leia. Ozzie tells Leia that he wants to tell Kitty that he is gay as part of a step-by-step plan to eventually tell his parents and gets Leia to test the waters for him. Kitty thinks that Leia is contemplating sex and Donna rushes over with all kinds of contraceptives. Jay and Nate get tricked by an older woman into trying out her "free" hot tub and almost end up in her "free" king size bed. Ozzie tries to send Kitty an email telling her that he’s gay but she messes it up by her lack of computer knowledge so he finally just tells her to her face. Kitty is fine with him being gay, but feels conflicted about him having a Canadian boyfriend. Meanwhile, Gwen and Nikki, left alone, realize they never hang out alone together and wonder what they have in common. After using some of the stash together, they get glamour shots. After their high wears off, they agree to never talk about it again.
6	6	"The Birthday Girl"	Gail Mancuso	Lindsey Turner	January 19, 2023
It's Leia's 15th birthday, and she can't get over Jay, who now has a new girlfriend, Serena. Kitty prepares for the birthday party, and Bob arrives from Florida. Bob gets Leia an expensive karaoke machine for her birthday, so Red and Kitty try to one-up him. Leia invites Jay and his girlfriend to the party, but they don't show up. Red gives Leia the Vista Cruiser for her birthday present. That night, Jay shows up at Leia's bedroom, and Leia kisses him. He kisses her back and says, "Serena who?". The two take a ride in the Vista Cruiser but get pulled over by the police.
7	7	"Boyfriend Day One"	Gail Mancuso	Clarissa Carson	January 19, 2023
Leia and Jay get pulled over because the Vista Cruiser still had license plates from 1980. Red bans Jay from the Forman house. Gwen asks Sherri if she can get a tattoo and she says no. Leia and Jay go to pick up Kitty at the dentist to show Red that Jay is responsible. Gwen gets them to stop at a tattoo parlor so that Kitty can sign off on an underage tattoo in her post dentist drugged up state. Ozzie and Nate go to check up on Nikki's SAT tutor and find out that he is a football star and a congressman's son. Kitty ends up getting a tattoo. Red gets mad at Leia, Jay and Sherri because they screwed up picking up Kitty. Nate tells Nikki that he is afraid that she is going to leave him behind but she reassures him. Red teaches Sherri how to ride a bike, sort of.
8	8	"Summer Storm"	Gail Mancuso	Tommy Johnagin	January 19, 2023
In this episode, Red uses a cane after Sherri hit him with a bike, and does chores around the house to not feel useless. Kitty takes the opportunity to donate old things he doesn't want to give away, and while moving clutter, she takes the kids' stash. Jay and Ozzie find the stash in the garage, and hide it in a jacket when Red catches them. Leia shares her concerns about her relationship with Nikki, who gives her tips. Gwen and Nate get into an argument over Nate's father.
9	9	"Dirty Double Booker"	Laura Prepon	Chrissy Pietrosh & Jessica Goldstein	January 19, 2023
Leia worries about whether to spend her last Saturday in Point Place going on a picnic with Jay or sneaking into a country club with Gwen and Ozzie. Nate worries about not having worked out for the football team all summer, which leaves him sore for the rest of the day. Kitty attempts to apply for a job as school nurse, with Nikki's help, despite Red's disapproval.
10	10	"Kids in America"	Laura Prepon	Gregg Mettler	January 19, 2023
Leia yells at Jay after hearing he is going to break up with her. When she yells at him, the others agree with Jay seeing as she will most likely not return until next summer. The next day, Kitty tries to persuade Leia to make up with Jay, as she enjoyed the house being full again which may not continue with Leia gone. Fenton attempts to punish Sherri when he sees she is dating Fez, and after hallucinating a past circle with Eric, Jackie and Kelso, Fez decides to save his relationship with Sherri. Back at the Forman residence, as Leia and Donna prepare to leave, Nate tries to talk to her about their moment.

=== Season 2 (2024) ===
No. overall	No. in season	Title	Directed by	Written by	Original release date
Part 2
11	1	"You Oughta Know"	Gail Mancuso	Gregg Mettler	June 27, 2024
On June 8, 1996, Leia returns to Point Place, and is trying to get the courage to tell Jay she almost kissed Nate the previous summer. Ozzie tries winning Spice Girls tickets in a radio contest. Given the Formans' front door neighbor has died, Donna convinces her father Bob to leave Florida and return to Point Place.
12	2	"Something to Talk About"	Gail Mancuso	Chrissy Pietrosh & Jessica Goldstein	June 27, 2024
Once the secret is out, Nate and Nikki reassess their relationship, Leia tries getting everyone's trust again, and Jay tries to get revenge by hitting on Donna. Red tries to change Bob's mind about becoming his neighbor again.
13	3	"Just a Friend"	Gail Mancuso	Tommy Johnagin	June 27, 2024
Leia gets a job at Hot Topic to work alongside Gwen, discovering she has a secret romance with Cole, an Abercrombie & Fitch employee. To cheer Nate up after his breakup, Jay watches porn with him, only for the tape to get stuck at the Formans' VHS player. Red takes Kitty to a fancy restaurant hoping to reignite their romance.
14	4	"Hold My Hand"	Gail Mancuso	Alison Wong	June 27, 2024
Kitty gets injured, and because neighborhood women frequently leave things for her and spend time with Red, she gets jealous. Leia tries to convince Gwen to take her relationship with Cole seriously. Jay and Nate take Ozzie to the bus station, where his Canadian boyfriend will arrive.
15	5	"What Is Love"	Gail Mancuso	Erin Fischer	June 27, 2024
Leia has driving lessons from all her grandparents. The group attends a kegger party in the woods, where Nikki and Nate bet on who will get more phone numbers, and Jay's plans to tell Leia that he really loves her are derailed once he's approached by a clingy ex-girlfriend.
16	6	"I Can See Clearly Now"	Gail Mancuso	King Hassan	June 27, 2024
Trying to prove Leia that he changed, Jay apologizes to all the women to whom he gave insincere declarations of love. After a night of sex, Nikki and Nate secretly continue seeing each other. Kitty starts treating herself with a healer. The girls steal Wonderbras from a shop, but only Gwen is taken by security. Kitty, still suffering from her injured leg, learns the healer is actually a con artist.
17	7	"Baby-Baby-Baby"	Gail Mancuso	Jake Lasker	June 27, 2024
Nikki's period is late, so Kitty helps her discover if she's pregnant. Red ends up hospitalized after eavesdropping on Leia and Jay expressing interest in having sex.
18	8	"Friends in Low Places"	Gail Mancuso	Tommy Johnagin	June 27, 2024
Red buys two tickets to Paris, but at the airport Kitty discovers Red is not willing to travel due to his fear of flying, so she tries to convince him otherwise. In an online chat, Ozzie pretends to be a woman to deceive Bob and send him on a date where he will be stood up. Knowing that Leia's grandparents will be away for two weeks, her classmates throw a party at the Forman house, with Leo using the opportunity to celebrate his retirement. Leo's son, Sonny and his friend Bunch (Kevin Smith and Jason Mewes) crash into the Forman's kitchen.
Part 3
19	9	"All Apologies"	Laura Prepon	Aaron Huffines	August 22, 2024
When Red and Kitty return from Paris to discover the kitchen wall broken, Nate takes the blame to impress Nikki. When Bob and his Italian brother are unable to fix the wall, Red forces Nate to do it, and they bond. To thank Nate for taking the blame, Leia, Jay and Ozzie go to a wrestling convention to get him signed memorabilia, but Jay and Leia get into an argument over who is more important, while Ozzie meets a new boy. Gwen and Nikki attempt to avoid Kitty, who tries to show them numerous pictures of the trip to Paris.
20	10	"Doll Parts"	Laura Prepon	David Goetsch	August 22, 2024
Leia is finally ready to have sex, but Jay messes up his shoulder, which leads to Nikki and Gwen advising her about trying self-pleasure. Leia then accidentally breaks the showerhead trying to masturbate. Ozzie, Nate and Jay try to get a baggie as pain relief, so they visit Sonny and Bunch, but end up trying to fix their friendship when they fight about Bunch breaking Sonny's didgeridoo. While trying to end their fight, Nate and Jay end up fighting on their own issues. They eventually forgive each other after talking in the circle. Donna worries about Red and Kitty when she finds out they're selling Kitty's Beanie Baby collection for fun. Nate tries to get a job in order to impress Nikki, but ends up finding her kissing an employee of the Hub. After getting advice from her mom, Leia and Jay have sex for the first time.
21	11	"Achy Breaky Heart"	Laura Prepon	Erin Fischer	August 22, 2024
After losing her virginity, Leia starts to overthink how much she really knows Jay. Meanwhile, Jay advises Nate to try and meet someone else, however he ends up blowing him off in case Leia wants to have sex again. Nate ends up meeting and hooking up with Betsy Kelso. Jay gets upset about Betsy and Nate, and asks them to stop seeing each other, but Betsy convinces Nate to ignore his wishes. Kitty gets upset after her vacuum cleaner breaks and Red tries to replace it with a new one.
22	12	"Two Princes"	Laura Prepon	Jake Lasker	August 22, 2024
Jay and Nate are still fighting, and refuse to make up. Leia tries to convince Betsy to get them to reconcile, but is manipulated by her. Kitty and Sherri try to help Ozzie get back in touch with Isaac, the boy he met at the wrestling convention. Red goes to a coffee shop and bonds with an employee who doesn't like dealing with rude customers, but ends up driving all the other customers away.
23	13	"Life Is a Highway"	Laura Prepon	King Hassan	August 22, 2024
Gwen's father, Otis, arrives to spend time with his daughter, but despite Red and Kitty's interference, ends up hooking up with Sherri. In anger, Gwen and Leia steal his truck. Nate struggles to break up with Betsy, getting advice on how from Jay. Ozzie and Isaac go on their first date to an R-rated movie, getting Sonny and Bunch to buy them tickets, only for the men to come with them. Nikki attempts to get to the next stage in her relationship with Theo.
24	14	"I'll Stand by You"	Laura Prepon	Mark Hudis	August 22, 2024
Kitty receives a speeding ticket, which could cause her license to be suspended. To avoid this, she and Red attempt to get Leia to lie in court for her. Having found out Nate is still in love with Nikki, Theo challenges him to a fight. Meanwhile, the teens find memorabilia in Gwen and Nate's attic. When Bob joins them and finds a lot of Donna and Midge's old things, he becomes nostalgic for the past.
25	15	"Are You Gonna Go My Way"	Laura Prepon	Alison Wong	August 22, 2024
Donna arrives to Point Place with the news that Eric was given a new job in California shadowing George Lucas to write a book on the upcoming Star Wars movies. This means that Donna has to decide what to do in regards to Leia. As Leia wants to stay in Point Place, she and her friends work together to try to convince Red, Kitty, and Donna to allow her to stay. Meanwhile, Ozzie enlists Nikki to help him look for a misplaced ring Isaac gave him, and thanks to Nate and Bob, Mitch learns that Donna is in town.
26	16	"Don't Look Back in Anger"	Laura Prepon	Chrissy Pietrosh & Jessica Goldstein	August 22, 2024
Now that Leia is staying in Point Place for the school year, she is able to join her friends for their night before school tradition. This includes them breaking onto the roof of the school. Meanwhile Donna and Kitty are at odds over decisions regarding Leia going forward.

== Production ==
That '70s Show aired on Fox from 1998 to 2006, centering around the lives of teenagers from 1976 to 1979. The show garnered additional popularity after its conclusion due to its availability on Netflix, before leaving the platform in September 2020.

In October 2021, Netflix announced a spin-off of the series, titled That '90s Show, with Kurtwood Smith and Debra Jo Rupp reprising their roles as Red and Kitty Forman, respectively. The show is produced by The Carsey-Werner Company, with Gregg Mettler serving as showrunner and Bonnie Turner, Terry Turner, their daughter Lindsay Turner, Marcy Carsey, Tom Werner, Smith and Rupp as executive producers.

Ten episodes were ordered, with the series taking on a multi-cam format like the original. The show was filmed in front of a live studio audience at Sunset Bronson Studios in Los Angeles from February 7 to July 21, 2022.

In February 2022, Callie Haverda, Ashley Aufderheide, Mace Coronel, Maxwell Acee Donovan, Reyn Doi and Sam Morelos joined the cast as series regulars. It was also reported that Topher Grace, Laura Prepon, Mila Kunis, Ashton Kutcher and Wilmer Valderrama would appear in recurring roles. Danny Masterson, who had a pending criminal trial at that time, did not appear as his character of Steven Hyde, who was simply not mentioned in the series; Masterson was convicted of rape in May 2023 and sentenced to thirty years in prison. Production commenced February 6. As Lisa Robin Kelly had died years before the spin-off was produced, her character of Laurie Forman did not return either though she was mentioned several times. On April 30, 2022, it was announced that Grace, Prepon, Kunis, Kutcher and Valderrama would all return for guest appearances. On February 3, 2023, Netflix renewed the series for a 16-episode second season.

Filming on the second season was due to take place between May and September 2023, but it was delayed due to the 2023 Hollywood labor disputes.

On October 3, 2024, it was announced that the series was canceled after two seasons.

== Release ==
The first season of That '90s Show released onto Netflix on January 19, 2023. The second season was divided into two parts, with the first eight episodes having been released on June 27, 2024, and another eight episodes being released on August 22, 2024 after it was originally set to be released on October 24. The first half of the episodes of season 2 have been released as "Part 2"; the second half was released as "Part 3" of the show.

== Reception ==
=== Audience viewership ===
During its debut week, That '90s Show ranked at number five on Netflix's Top 10 TV English titles just three days after its release with 41.08 million hours viewed. The following week, the series reached number four and garnered 26.25 million viewing hours.

=== Critical response ===
On Rotten Tomatoes, the first season holds an approval rating of 75% with an average rating of 6.4/10, based on 52 critic reviews. The website's critics consensus reads, "A solidly serviceable sequel series, That '90s Show may take a little time to find its rhythm, but still delivers a respectable number of warmly nostalgic laughs." Metacritic assigned a score of 58 out of 100 based on 23 critics, indicating "mixed or average reviews".

The Hollywood Reporter's Angie Han wrote: "[That '90s Show] aims for nothing much more ambitious than re-creating the low-key charm of its predecessor. But it hits that target with enough confidence and consistency to become a treat in its own right." Steve Greene, writing for IndieWire, viewed it "better than it [had] any right to be," praising the new cast's "easy" chemistry and the performances of Smith and Rupp. Brian Lowry of CNN dubbed it "high in nostalgia but only half-baked," while Lucy Mangan at The Guardian found it likable enough and nostalgic.

Manuel Betancourt of The A.V. Club gave the series' first season a B and wrote "If you grew up watching That '70s Show, you'll likely have no way of assessing whether That '90s Show works on its own. Maybe it can't. And maybe it doesn't even want to." Alan Sepinwall, in a column for Rolling Stone, expressed doubt that the multi-cam approach could find an audience in the streaming era; Richard Roeper gave a rating of two out of four stars and described it as "a little edgy and occasionally chuckle-inducing and mostly sweet-natured, and it's just OK and quickly forgettable."

The second season has an 88% approval rating on Rotten Tomatoes, based on 8 reviews, with an average rating of 8/10.
