= Left Hand Brewing Company =

Brewery in Longmont, Colorado

Coordinates: 40°9′30.588″N 105°6′55.604″W

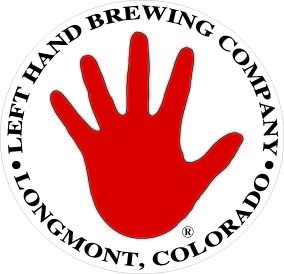
- Industry: Alcoholic beverage
- Founded: 1993
- Founder: Dick Doore; Eric Wallace
- Headquarters: Longmont, Colorado, United States
- Area served: North America
- Key people: Eric Wallace (CEO)
- Products: Beer
- Production output: 78,000 US beer barrels (2016)
- Website: http://www.lefthandbrewing.com/

Left Hand Brewing Company is a craft brewery located in Longmont, Colorado, US.

== History ==
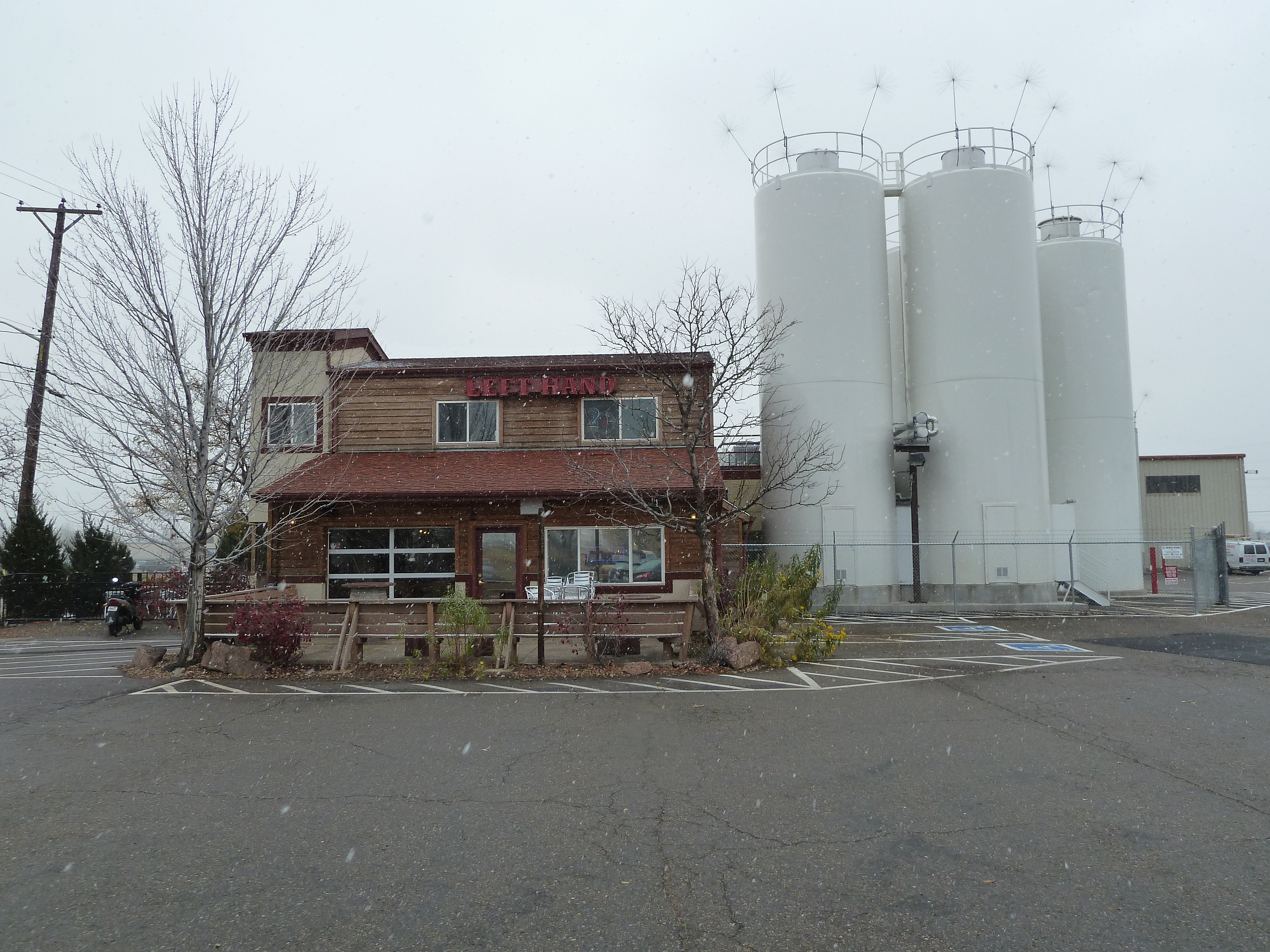
Left Hand Brewing

Left Hand began in December 1990 with a homebrewing kit that founder Dick Doore received from his brother. According to Doore, "it was all downhill from there." By 1993, Doore had teamed up with college buddy Eric Wallace and they resolved to start a brewery.

On September 21, 1993, they incorporated as Indian Peaks Brewing Company, and purchased a former meat-packing plant next to the St. Vrain River outside downtown Longmont, Colorado. A few weeks after beginning production, it was discovered that the name Indian Peaks was already in use by another brewery, so the name was changed to Left Hand, in honor of Chief Niwot (the Arapahoe word for "left hand") whose tribe wintered in the local area.

Left Hand's doors opened for business on January 22, 1994. Their first batch of beer was Sawtooth Ale In October of that year. Left Hand took home two medals at the Great American Beer Festival, a gold medal in the bitter category for Sawtooth Ale, and a bronze medal in the Robust Porter category for Black Jack Porter. In 1995, the brewery was able to start putting its logo on bottle caps. But when it came down to shrinking down the original logo to put on a crown, the design was illegible. Left Hand created a small hand to be the logo. It morphed into a sticker, and eventually into the company logo used today.

In April 1998, Left Hand merged with Tabernash Brewing, and doubled the size of their brewery. In June, they began packaging 12 oz. bottles for 6 packs (up to that point they had been bottling 22 oz. bottles and kegs exclusively). In November, they started their own distribution business, Indian Peaks Distribution Company. Tabernash was phased out and Indian Peaks Distribution Company was sold, allowing Left Hand to focus and redirect their energy back to brewing.

In recent years, the brewery has experience significant growth. With over 30% growth in 2010, Left Hand has steadily increased its production, making the Brewers Association's Top 50 Craft Brewers list in 2012. The brewery has added six 480 barrel fermenters, an additional 500 barrel bright tank, and a new KHS keg line. Left Hand has also expanded the brewery property, purchasing the warehouse across Boston Avenue to house offices as well as the site of a new 6,000 square foot cooler, bringing the total brewery acreage to 5.5 acres. In the fall of 2012, Left Hand opened a new bottling line that runs four times faster than their previous system and fills 200 bottles per minute.

On the first night of the 2011 Great American Beer Festival, Left Hand introduced Milk Stout Nitro in a bottle, which has become their most popular beer, making it both the first American and the first craft brewery to bottle a nitrogenated beer without a widget. Two years later, Left Hand expanded the bottled Nitro series with Sawtooth Nitro and Wake Up Dead Nitro.

Left Hand produced approximately 65,879 barrels in 2013.

== Bottled Beers ==
Perennial Collection:

- Sawtooth Ale
- Travelin' Light
- Milk Stout
- Milk Stout Nitro
- Extrovert IPA
- Polestar Pilsner
- Black Jack Porter
- Introvert IPA
- Wake Up Dead Nitro

Seasonal Collection:

- Good Juju
- Oktoberfest
- Fade to Black
- Hard Wired Nitro Coffee Porter
- Well Played Red IPA
- Braveheart Nitro

Big Mo Series (all 22 oz):

- Oak Aged Wake Up Dead
- Chainsaw Double ESB
- Twin Sisters Double IPA
- Smokejumper Imperial Smoked Porter
- Warrior IPA
- St. Vrain Tripel
- Widdershins Oak Aged Barleywine
- Wake Up Dead Imperial Stout

Ambidextrous Ale Series (Draft Only):

- Step One: Imperial Milk Stout
- Step Two: Smoked Doppelbock
- Step Three: Great Juju
- Step Four: Maibock
- Step Five: Sticke Alt

Safety Round Series (Draft Only):

- Round One: Belgian Pale Ale
- Round Two: Copper Ale

Collaborations (all 22 oz):

- TerraRye'ZD (2008)
- Depth Charge (2009)
- Oxymoron (2010)
- Peaotch (2011)

Discontinued Beers:

- Motherlode Golden Ale
- Jackman's Pale Ale
- Haystack Wheat
- Deep Cover Brown Ale
- Snowbound Winter Ale
- XXXmas Ale
- Fade to Black Vol. 1 (Foreign Export Stout)
- Fade to Black Vol. 2 (Smoked Baltic Porter)
- Fade to Black Vol. 3 (Pepper Porter)
- Fade to Black Vol. 4 (Rocky Mountain Black Ale)
- TNT Weizen Doppelbock
- Rye Bock Lager
- Smoked Goosinator Doppelbock

Note: all active beers are available in 6 packs of 12 oz bottles unless otherwise noted.

== Awards ==
Beer	Competition	Category	Year	Place
Milk Stout	Great American Beer Festival	Sweet or Cream Stout	2014	Silver Medal
Smokejumper Smoked Imperial Porter	Great American Beer Festival	Smoke Beer	2014	Silver Medal
Black Jack Porter	Great American Beer Festival	Brown Porter	2014	Silver Medal
Sawtooth Ale	World Beer Cup	Ordinary or Special Bitter	2014	Gold Award
Milk Stout	European Beer Star	Sweet Stout	2014	Gold Award
Sawtooth Ale	Great American Beer Festival	Ordinary or Special Bitter	2013	Gold Medal
Milk Stout	Great American Beer Festival	Sweet or Cream Stout	2013	Gold Medal
Fade to Black Volume 1 - Foreign Export Stout	Great American Beer Festival	Foreign Style Stout	2013	Gold Medal
Milk Stout	European Beer Star Competition	Sweet Stout	2013	Gold Award
Sawtooth Ale	Great American Beer Festival	Ordinary or Special Bitter	2012	Bronze Medal
Milk Stout	European Beer Star Competition	Sweet Stout	2012	Gold Award
Fade to Black- Vol.1	Great American Beer Festival	Foreign Stout	2010	Gold Medal
Black Jack Porter	European Beer Star Competition	Porter	2010	Gold Award
Smokejumper	Great American Beer Festival	Smoked Beer	2009	Gold Medal
Milk Stout	European Beer Star Competition	Sweet Stout	2009	Gold Award
Milk Stout	Great American Beer Festival	Sweet Stout	2008	Silver Medal
Sawtooth Ale	Great American Beer Festival	Bitter or Pale Mild Ale	2008	Bronze Medal
Milk Stout	World Beer Cup	Sweet Stout	2008	Gold Award
Milk Stout	European Beer Star Competition	Sweet Stout	2008	Gold Award
Milk Stout	European Beer Star Competition	Sweet Stout	2007	Silver Award
Milk Stout	World Beer Cup	Sweet Stout	2006	Gold Award
Tabernash Oktoberfest	Great American Beer Festival	German Style Marzen / Oktoberfest	2001	Bronze Medal
Black Jack Porter	Great American Beer Festival	Brown Porter	2000	Gold Medal
Tabernash Oktoberfest	Great American Beer Festival	German Style Marzen / Oktoberfest	1999	Bronze Medal
Tabernash Golden Pilsner	Great American Beer Festival	European Style Pilsner	1998	Gold Medal
Black Jack Porter	World Beer Cup	Brown Porter	1998	Gold Award
Tabernash Weiss	World Beer Cup	South German-Style Hefeweizen / Hefeweissbier	1998	Gold Award
Tabernash Munich Dark Lager	World Beer Cup	European-Style Dark / Münchner Dunkel	1998	Gold Award
Tabernash Munich Dark	Great American Beer Festival	European Style Dark / Munchener Dunkel	1997	Gold Medal
Tabernash Oktoberfest	Great American Beer Festival	Marzen / Oktoberfest	1997	Bronze Medal
Tabernash Weiss	World Beer Cup	South German-Style Weizen / Weissbier	1996	Bronze Award
Tabernash Derailer Doppelbock	World Beer Cup	German-Style Strong Bock Beer	1996	Gold Award
Tabernash Munich Dark Lager	World Beer Cup	European-Style Dark Lager	1996	Gold Award
Black Jack Porter	Great American Beer Festival	Robust Porter	1995	Gold Medal
Sawtooth Ale	Great American Beer Festival	Bitter	1994	Gold Medal
Black Jack Porter	Great American Beer Festival	Robust Porter	1994	Bronze Medal
Juju Ginger	Great American Beer Festival	Herb, Spice	1994	Honorable Mention
Tabernash Denargo Lager	Great American Beer Festival	Dark Lager	1994	Bronze Medal
Tabernash Golden Spike	Great American Beer Festival	Export / Helles	1994	Bronze Medal
Tabernash Weiss	Great American Beer Festival	German Wheat	1994	Gold Medal

== See also ==
- Barrel-aged beer
