= Paulina Singer =

American actress (born 1991)

- Born: September 5, 1991 (age 35); Exeter, New Hampshire, U.S.
- Occupation: Actress
- Years active: 2011–present

Paulina Singer aka Zuzusilk, is an American actress, singer, music producer, writer and dancer, known for her roles as Ziza on Season II of Power: Raising Kanan, as Jessie Tyler on Freeform's teen drama series Dead of Summer, Pink in the movie The Wilde Wedding with Glenn Close, John Malkovich, Patrick Stewart and Minnie Driver, The Intern with Robert De Niro and multiple guest roles on various TV series including Person of Interest, The Affair, Gotham and Blue Bloods.

== Early life ==
Singer was born in Exeter, New Hampshire. Her father is African American and her mother is of Ukrainian descent. She studied for a year at Eugene Lang College The New School for Liberal Arts in New York City before dropping out to pursue an acting career. At 19, Singer joined the Upright Citizens Brigade to study improvisational theatre.

== Career ==
In 2014, Singer was cast in musician Russ's music video for the song Gypsy. In 2015, Singer was cast in a main role in the We TV horror drama series South of Hell, executive produced by Eli Roth and Jason Blum. She portrayed Grace Bledsoe, alongside Mena Suvari and Bill Irwin. The following year, she joined the regular cast of Freeform's teen drama-thriller series Dead of Summer, portraying summer camp counselor Jessie Tyler. In 2017, she portrayed the lead role of Kelley Winters in the Lifetime television film High School Lover, alongside James Franco, Lana Condor, and Julia Jones. In 2018, she starred in Stella's Last Weekend, alongside Nat Wolff and Alex Wolff.

== Filmography ==
=== Film ===
Year	Title	Role	Notes
2012	Nuggets Official Movie	Corrine	
2013	The Friend Zone	-	Short
2013	1970somethin	Mandy	Short
2014	The Recipe	Sasha London	
2015	The Nymphets	Madison	
2015	Puerto Ricans in Paris	Lexi	
2015	The Intern	ATF Receptionist	
2016	Uncaged	Rose	
2017	High School Lover	Kelley Winters	TV movie
2017	The Wilde Wedding	Pink	
2017	Darcy, This is Nowhere	Twinkle	
2018	Print Shop	Sherrelle	Short
2018	Shrimp	Angelina	TV movie
2018	Stella's Last Weekend	Violet	
2019	oMo	Urbanoid	Short
2020	Darcy, This is Nowhere	Twinkle	
2021	Hatched	-	Short
2021	Sk8r Grrl	Dynamic	
2022	Broken Soldier	Nell	

=== Television ===
Year	Title	Role	Notes
2011	How to Make It in America	Nilda Dominguez	Recurring cast: season 2
2013	Person of Interest	Amber	Episode: "Liberty"
2014	The Affair	Ruby	Episode: "Episode #1.2"
2015	Gotham	Josie Mac	Recurring cast: season 2
2015	South of Hell	Grace Bledsoe	Main cast
2016	Blue Bloods	Maribel Rivas	Episode: "Blast from the Past"
2016	Orange Is the New Black	Aliyah Jones	Episode: "Toast Can't Never Be Bread Again"
2016	Dead of Summer	Jessie Tyler	Main cast
2016	Same Same	Corey	Episode: "Scissr: Pilot"
2018	Falling Water	Lainie Whicker	Recurring cast: season 2
2018	Tell Me a Story	Laney Reed	Recurring cast: season 1
2019	NOS4A2	Willa Brewster	Recurring cast: season 1
2020	The Baker and the Beauty	Zoe	Episode: "Pilot"
2022	Power Book III: Raising Kanan	Zisa	Recurring cast: season 2
2024	Elsbeth	Ivy Benson	Episode: "Sweet Justice"
2024	Everybody Still Hates Chris	Tasha Clarkson (voice)	Recurring cast
