= Aniq (The Afterparty episode) =

- The Afterparty episode
- Episode no.: Season 1 Episode 1
- Directed by: Christopher Miller
- Written by: Christopher Miller; Kassia Miller
- Cinematography by: Carl Herse
- Editing by: Joel Negron; Nick Olah
- Original release date: January 28, 2022
- Running time: 67 minutes

Guest appearances
- Channing Tatum as himself / "Young John Oates"; Will Forte as himself; Mel Rodriguez as Captain Ostrander (voice)

Episode chronology
← Previous —	Next → "Brett"

"Aniq" is the series premiere of the American murder mystery comedy-drama television series The Afterparty. The episode was written and directed by series creator Christopher Miller, and co-written by Kassia Miller. It was released on Apple TV+ on January 28, 2022, simultaneously with the second and third episodes.

The series follows the events following a high school reunion after-party ending in murder, where everyone is a suspect, as Detective Danner interviews the suspects present, having her tell them their "mind-movies" about the night in question/the events leading up to it. The episode follows Danner as she interviews the main suspect, escape room designer Aniq Adjaye, who simultaneously begins his own investigation to clear his name alongside his best friend Yasper.

The episode received a positive critical reception.

== Plot ==
In Marin County, California, prominent pop music icon Xavier (Dave Franco) is found dead, having been pushed off of his cliffside home to his death the after-party of his high school reunion, held at his home. Against the advice of her superior, Detective Danner (Tiffany Haddish) takes on the case, questioning Aniq Adjaye (Sam Richardson), an escape room designer and the current main suspect, who tells his story of the night in the style of a romantic comedy: he was in pursuit of his high school crush Zoë Zhu (Zoë Chao) at the reunion, but faced competition from both Xavier and Zoë's ex-husband Brett, ultimately threatening Xavier seemingly seconds before his murder. Following his interview, believing that he will be blamed for the crime, Aniq begins his own investigation alongside his best friend Yasper E. Lennov (Ben Schwartz).

== Production ==
=== Development ===
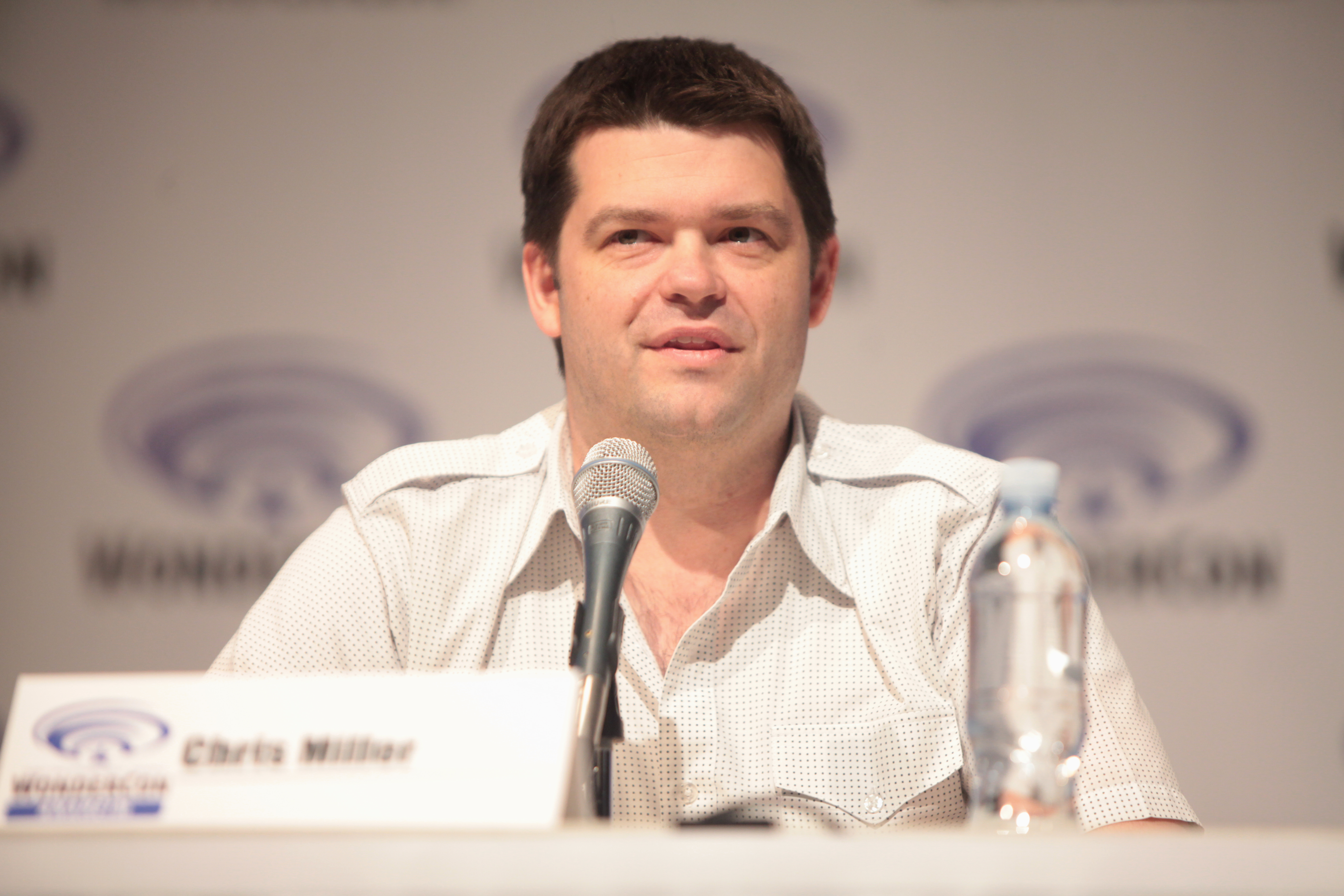
Series creator Christopher Miller wrote and directed the episode, co-written by Kassia Miller.

Christopher Miller conceived of The Afterparty in the 2010s, wanting to make a murder mystery showing the different perspectives of the murder from its witnesses, inspired by Akira Kurosawa's Rashomon. The high school reunion aspect was added after Miller attended such a reunion himself, thinking it would be a unique setting for such a concept. Miller initially wrote the project as a feature-length film, by June 2013 set to be produced as su at Sony Pictures as The Reunion, with Miller as sole writer and director. However, the film never came to fruition due to commitments with The Lego Movie and 22 Jump Street. Over subsequent years, Miller reworked his screenplay as a mini-series.

On June 24, 2020, it was announced that Apple TV+ had given the production an eight-episode straight-to-series order, now titled The Afterparty, created by Miller, serving as the series' showrunner.

=== Casting ===
In November 2020, the cast was announced, including Tiffany Haddish, Sam Richardson, Ben Schwartz, Ike Barinholtz, Ilana Glazer and Dave Franco.

=== Filming ===
On November 11, 2020, Miller confirmed filming for the series had begun. Miller directed all eight episodes in the series.

== Reception ==
"Aniq" received a generally positive critical reception. Greg Wheeler of The Review Geek called it "a hilarious episode that manages to combine drama, mystery and comedy together into a delightfully heady cocktail", stating that "the idea of having a different character give their version of events each chapter, subtly shifting the genres around and using that as a way of projecting their own persona and version of events is, quite frankly, genius". Mary Littlejohn of TV Fanatic called the episode "a light-hearted, breezy take on the murder mystery", with the cast "keep[ing] it engaging and dynamic".

Richard Valero of The Music City Drive-In praised Dave Franco's "eccentric over-the-top" performance as Xavier, calling it "the perfect role" for him, with "the rest of the cast highlight[ing] some phenomenal casting and does a great job setting the tone for what is ahead on the show", stating that "you can't ask for a better pilot".

Nick Carudo of TVLine complimented the episode as precedence to a "next comedic murder mystery obsession", comparatively with Only Murders in the Building, with OC Movie Reviews calling it "a fun start to The Afterparty [with] some interesting characters". Emma Fraser of IGN praised the premiere as "avoid[ing] repetition thanks to the genre-blending set-up and leaves you wanting more [with] Chris Miller's grasp of the various tropes and familiar beats [serving as] more than a corny gimmick", Erin Allen of TellTaleTV lauding its "sympathetic" portrayal of Aniq.

Rating the premiere "10/10", Christian Hubbard of Full Circle Cinema lauded the premiere for "succeed[ing] in setting the stakes as well as introducing the characters", with Alex Welch of Inverse calling it "a homage to a Richard Curtis-penned rom-com". Shirley Tayshete of Meaww called the premiere "a real treat", praising Richardson's performance as "adorable and funny", Haddish as "quirky", and Franco "making an excellent sleazy, arrogant, and dumb star".
