= Phil Lord and Christopher Miller's unrealized projects =

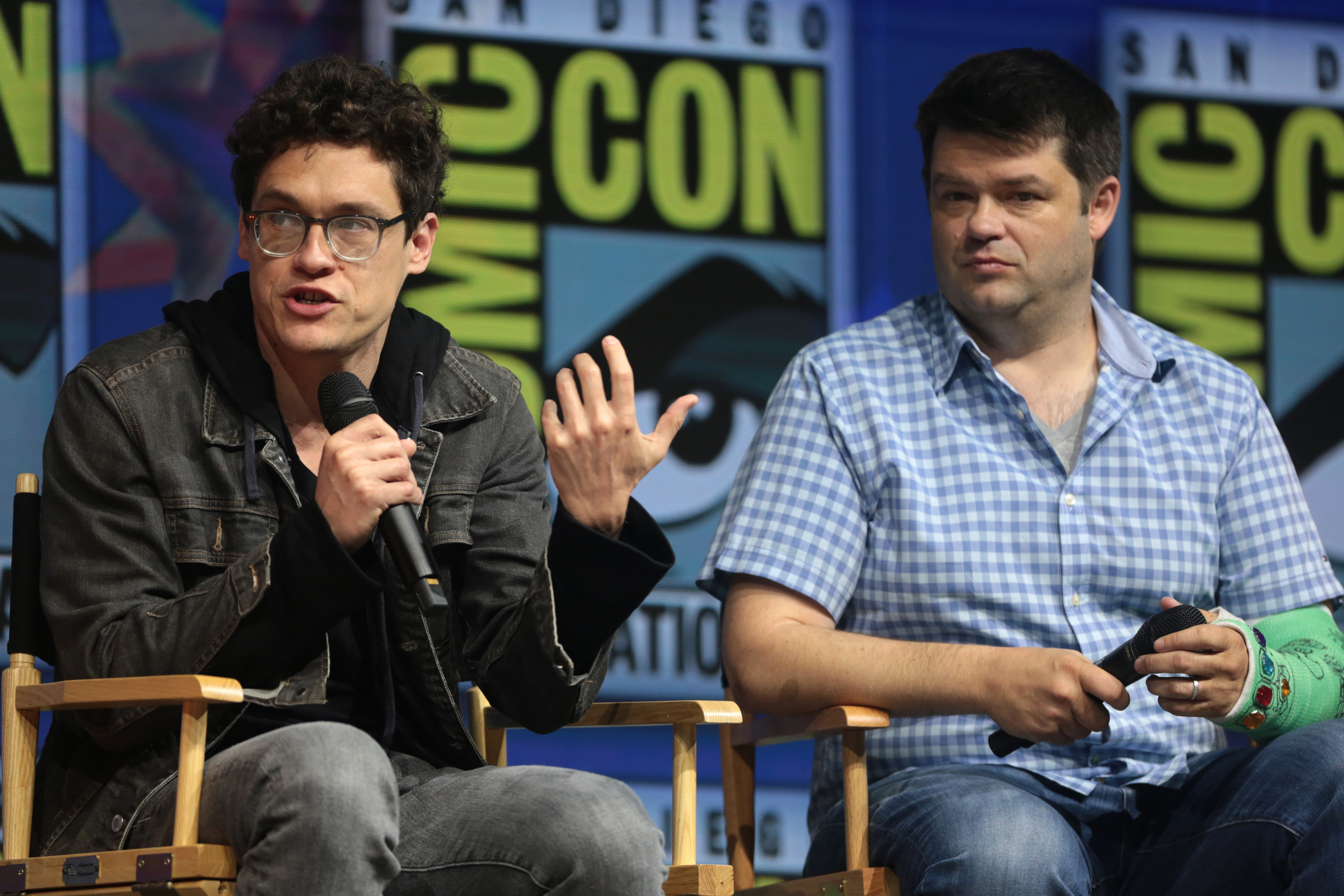
Lord (left) and Miller (right) at the 2018 San Diego Comic-Con

During their career, film-making duo Phil Lord and Christopher Miller have worked on a number of projects which never progressed beyond the pre-production stage under their direction. Some of these projects are officially cancelled or fell in development hell.

== 2010s ==
=== Bob the Musical ===
By December 2010, Phil Lord and Christopher Miller were in talks to replace Adam Shankman and Mark Waters as directors of the movie musical comedy Bob the Musical for Walt Disney Pictures and Benderspink's Chris Bender and the late J.C. Spink and Contrafilm's Beau Flynn and Tripp Vinson attached to produce the movie. In December 2011, Lord and Miller were officially attached to direct the movie from a screenplay from Matthew Fogel, Marc Shaiman would work on the music, Robert Lopez would write the songs. In July 2015, Lord and Miller were replaced by Michel Hazanavicius as director, Michael Chabon writing the script, Bret McKenzie would write the songs, Tom Cruise was in talks to star in the movie, and Bender, Spink, Flynn and Vinson still attached as producers.

=== Carter Beats the Devil ===
On June 3, 2012, it was reported that Lord and Miller were in talks to direct the long-in-development film adaptation of Glen David Gold's historical fiction novel Carter Beats the Devil, with Michael Gilio writing the screenplay and Jon Shestack producing for Warner Bros. Set in the 1920s, the book features such real-life figures as stage magician Charles Joseph Carter, then-President Warren G. Harding, television inventor Philo Farnsworth, Harry Houdini and the young Marx brothers. In a 2014 interview with /Film, Miller updated that he and Lord were still working on the project, but that it's "been a little tricky to crack". By the following year, it was still in development.

=== The Reunion ===
On June 27, 2013, it was reported that Lord and Miller will produce The Reunion, a high school comedy set to be solo directed and written by Miller, with Jonathan Kadin and Hannah Minghella overseeing the production for Sony. The concept would eventually come to fruition as The Afterparty, a TV series for Apple TV that lasted for two seasons.

=== Torched TV series ===
On September 30, 2013, Lord and Miller were set to produce Chris Romano's family comedy series Torched, for Fox Broadcasting Company with Johnny Depp’s Infinitum Nihil producing the pilot episode.

=== Untitled Ghostbusters film ===
In April 2014, Sony pursued a short list of potential directors for Ghostbusters 3, including Phil Lord and Chris Miller, but they passed on the project.

=== The Greatest American Hero reboot ===
In August 2014, Lord and Miller were attached to reboot the 1981 TV series The Greatest American Hero for Fox. They were to executive produce the series, with 22 Jump Street co-writer Rodney Rothman writing the pilot and also executive producing. By 2017, Lord, Miller, and Rothman were out as 20th Century Fox Television were interested in developing a female-led reboot from Fresh Off the Boat creator Nahnatchka Khan and would instead air on ABC. However, ABC decided to not pick up the show in 2018.

=== 23 Jump Street/MIB 23 ===
On September 10, 2014, 23 Jump Street was confirmed. Channing Tatum had yet to sign on to the project, stating, "I don't know if that joke works three times, so we'll see." On August 7, 2015, it was revealed that Lord and Miller would not direct the film, but instead write and produce. A first draft of the film's script has been completed. On December 10, 2014, it was revealed that Sony was planning a crossover between Men in Black and Jump Street. The news was leaked after Sony's system was hacked and then confirmed by the directors of the films, Lord and Miller, during an interview about it. James Bobin was announced as the director in March 2016. The title of the crossover was later revealed as MIB 23, and it was revealed that the crossover would replace a 23 Jump Street film. However, the project was canceled in January 2019. Shortly after, Phil Lord stated that, despite MIB 23 not happening, a third sequel entitled 24 Jump Street was in development.

=== Female-driven 21 Jump Street ===
In early 2015, a female-driven 21 Jump Street film was rumored to also be in the works. In December 2016, Rodney Rothman was confirmed to direct the film. In December 2018, Tiffany Haddish was confirmed to lead the film and Awkwafina is in talks.

=== The Flash ===
By April 2015, Phil Lord and Christopher Miller were writing a story treatment for The Flash film for the DC Extended Universe. In October 2015, Seth Grahame-Smith was in negotiations to direct and write the script, based on the treatment by Lord and Miller. He departed the project due to creative differences in April 2016.

=== Serial TV series ===
On September 30, 2015, Lord and Miller were set to produce the television series adaptation of the podcast Serial for Fox Broadcasting Company with Julie Snyder, Sarah Koenig, Alissa Shipp, Ira Glass, and Seth Cohen producing the television series adaptation.

=== In Time TV series ===
On October 21, 2015, Lord and Miller were set to produce Julius Sharpe's science-fiction comedy series In Time, for Fox Broadcasting Company, which got a pilot order in January 2016.

=== Solo: A Star Wars Story ===
In January 2017, Lord and Miller began directing the then-untitled Solo: A Star Wars Story. On June 20, 2017, it was reported that they had been fired from the project by Lucasfilm, after over four-and-a-half months of filming, about three-quarters through principal photography. Lucasfilm announced that "creative differences" were the reason, with Entertainment Weekly reporting that Lord and Miller were going off-script and trying to make the film into more of a comedy. They were unwilling to compromise with Lucasfilm and writer Lawrence Kasdan on the direction of the film, preferring their vision. Two days later, Ron Howard was announced as the replacement, to complete the film and reshoots. Lord and Miller received executive-producer credits on Solo: A Star Wars Story.

In November 2017, Lord and Miller commented on their departure from Solo: A Star Wars Story. Lord stated "The experience of shooting the movie was wonderful. We had the most incredible cast and crew and collaborators. [...] We're really proud of the work we did on the movie and we wish everybody the best." Miller added "As Phil said, we had such a great relationship with cast and crew, we were really rooting for them. After we took a much-needed vacation, we got back into it and now we're writing and producing a sequel to The Lego Movie and producing a Miles Morales animated Spider-Man."

=== Artemis ===
In September 2017, Lord and Miller were announced as co-directors of the film adaptation of Andy Weir's 2017 novel Artemis. Geneva Robertson-Dworet would adapt the novel. However, due to the Disney-Fox merger and producer Simon Kinberg ending his deal with the company, the fate of the project is unknown. Despite that, while promoting Project Hail Mary, Lord and Miller still expressed interest in directing Artemis in the near future.

=== Last Human ===
By February 2019, Phil Lord and Christopher Miller were set to direct and produce the live-action/animated hybrid adaptation of Lee Bacon's children's book Last Human for Tristar Pictures and Henry Gayden writing the screenplay.

=== Untitled Andy Weir project ===
On November 14, 2019, Lord and Miller were set to direct an original story from Andy Weir for Universal Pictures.

=== Untitled wellness sitcom ===
On December 19, 2019, Lord and Miller were set to produce Nicole Delaney & Matt Hausfater's wellness sitcom for Fox.

== 2020s ==
=== Everyday Parenting Tips ===
In August 2020, it was announced that Lord and Miller would produce an adaptation of Simon Rich's short story Everyday Parenting Tips, with Rich set to both write the screenplay & produce the movie, Paul King attached to direct, and Ryan Reynolds attached to star and produce through Maximum Effort for Universal Pictures.

=== Untitled Universal Monsters comedic thriller ===
In November 2020, it was announced that Lord and Miller would produce and possibly direct a Universal Monsters comedic thriller, with Wes Tooke set to write the screenplay based on the story idea from Reid Carolin, and Channing Tatum attached to star and produce through his Free Association company with Carolin & Peter Kiernan for Universal Pictures.

=== The Premonition ===
In May 2021, it was announced that Lord and Miller would produce and direct an adaptation of the book The Premonition: A Pandemic Story, which chronicles the early days of the COVID-19 pandemic.

=== Untitled Hall & Oates biopic ===
In a 2022 interview with /Film during promotion of The Afterparty, Lord and Miller expressed interest in making a biopic of Hall & Oates.

=== Western TV series ===
In March 2022, it was announced that Lord and Miller would produce Michelle Morgan's Western comedy series Western, in collaboration with Sony Pictures Television and Amazon Studios for Amazon Freevee, with a cast led by Anna Konkle, Guy Burnet, Luca Diaz and Daniella Pineda. In March 2023, Freevee passed on the series, and agreed that the series can be shopped around to another platform.
