= How I Met Your Mother season 1 =

Season of television series

How I Met Your Mother
- Season 1
- Season 1 DVD cover art
- Starring: Josh Radnor; Jason Segel; Cobie Smulders; Neil Patrick Harris; Alyson Hannigan
- No. of episodes: 22

Release
- Original network: CBS
- Original release: September 19, 2005 – May 15, 2006

Season chronology
- Next → Season 2

The first season of How I Met Your Mother, an American sitcom created by Carter Bays and Craig Thomas, premiered on CBS in the United States on September 19, 2005, and concluded on May 15, 2006. The season was directed by Pamela Fryman and produced by Bays & Thomas Productions and 20th Century Fox Television. It consists of 22 episodes, each running approximately 22 minutes in length.

The season introduces Ted Mosby (voiced by former Full House actor Bob Saget) in the year 2030 as he sits his daughter and son down to tell them the story of how he met their mother. The story begins in 2005 with Ted (Josh Radnor) as a single, 27-year-old architect living in Manhattan with his two best friends from college: Marshall Eriksen (Jason Segel), a law student, and Lily Aldrin (Alyson Hannigan), a kindergarten teacher, who have been dating for almost nine years when Marshall proposes. Their engagement causes Ted to think about marriage and finding his soul mate, much to the disgust of his self-appointed best friend Barney Stinson (Neil Patrick Harris). Ted begins his search for his perfect mate and meets an ambitious young reporter, Robin Scherbatsky (Cobie Smulders), whom he quickly falls in love with.

The first season garnered mixed-to-positive reviews, despite this the show appeared on several television best lists. The first season garnered an average of 9.47 million viewers per all 22 episodes in the United States. Out of all regular primetime programming that aired during the 2005–2006 American television season, How I Met Your Mother ranked 51st out of 156, according to the Nielsen ratings system.

== Production ==
How I Met Your Mother was inspired by creators Carter Bays and Craig Thomas's idea to "write about our friends and the stupid stuff we did in New York", where they previously worked as writers for Late Show with David Letterman.

=== Filming ===
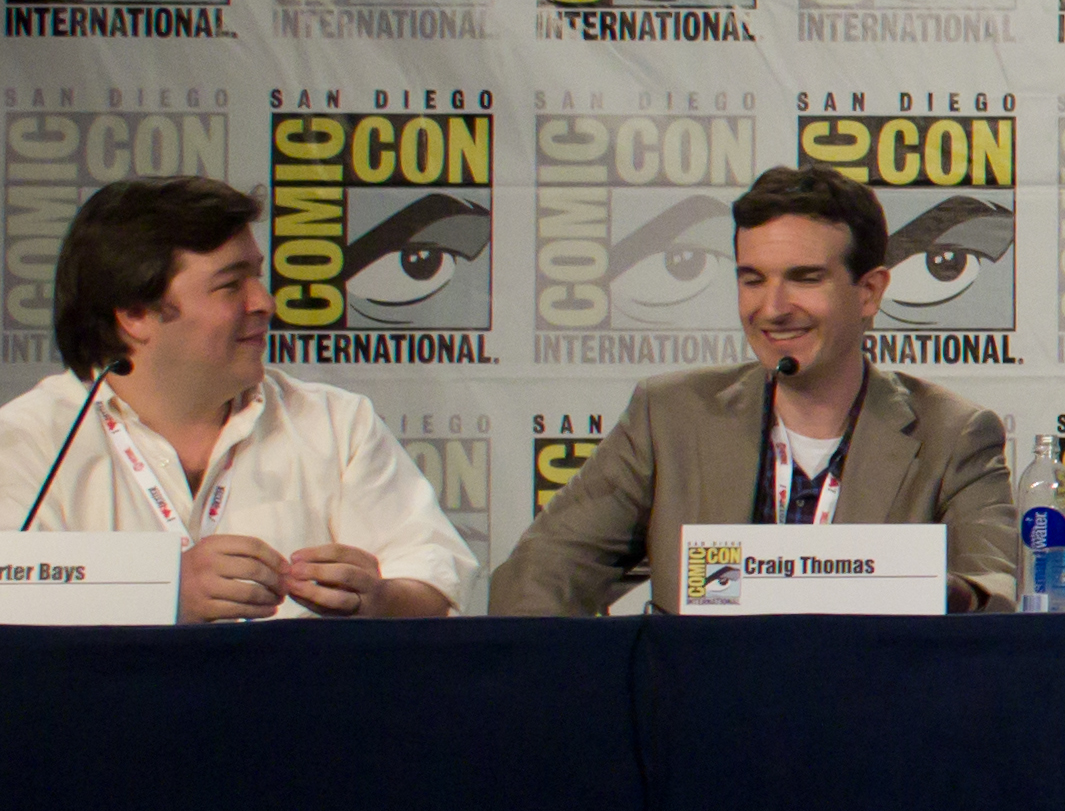
Creators Carter Bays (left), and Craig Thomas (right) at a panel at San Diego Comic-Con.

Every single episode of the season was directed by Pamela Fryman. She went on to direct all but 12 episodes of the series.

=== Casting ===
The first season features a cast of five actors who receive star billing. Josh Radnor portrays Ted, a young architect who is searching for his future wife. Jason Segel and Alyson Hannigan portray Marshall Eriksen and Lily Aldrin, respectively, a newly engaged couple. Cobie Smulders plays Robin Scherbatsky, an ambitious reporter whom Ted falls for. Barney Stinson, Ted's self-appointed best friend and a womanizer, is played by Neil Patrick Harris. Season one also introduced several recurring cast members, including Lyndsy Fonseca and David Henrie as Ted's children, and Ashley Williams as Victoria, Ted's love interest for the second half of the season. The season one pilot episode was recognized by the Casting Society of America with a nomination for the Best Comedy Pilot Casting Artios Award.

The two drew from their friendship in creating the characters. Ted is based loosely on Bays, and Marshall and Lily are based loosely on Thomas and his wife. Thomas's wife Rebecca was initially reluctant to have a character based on her, but agreed if they could get Hannigan to play her. Radnor and Segel were relative unknowns, but Smulders, another relatively little-known actress, was cast as Robin after Jennifer Love Hewitt turned down the role in favor of Ghost Whisperer. Bays and Thomas commented on her casting by saying, "thank God we did for a million reasons ... when Ted's seeing her for the first time, America's seeing her for the first time — the intriguingness of that propelled the show going forward and kept the show alive".

The role of Barney was initially envisioned as a "John Belushi-type character" before Neil Patrick Harris won the role after being invited to an audition by the show's casting director Megan Branman. Harris's character was widely reported to be the breakout character, with Variety calling him "the major breakout" and Boston.com noting that his character was the "most buzzed about element of the show". Robert Bianco from USA Today observed that Harris "sparkled" in his role, and further praised Hannigan's performance as equally "delightful" as her role in Buffy the Vampire Slayer.

=== Main cast ===
- Josh Radnor as Ted Mosby
- Jason Segel as Marshall Eriksen
- Cobie Smulders as Robin Scherbatsky
- Neil Patrick Harris as Barney Stinson
- Alyson Hannigan as Lily Aldrin
- Bob Saget (uncredited) as Future Ted Mosby (voice only)

=== Recurring cast ===
- Lyndsy Fonseca as Penny (future daughter)
- David Henrie as Luke (future son)
- Ashley Williams as Victoria
- Joe Nieves as Carl
- Alexis Denisof as Sandy Rivers
- Marshall Manesh as Ranjit
- Charlene Amoia as Wendy the Waitress

=== Guest cast ===
- Virginia Williams as Claudia
- Kelly Stables as Masseuse
- Amy Acker as Penelope

== Reception ==
Season one of How I Met Your Mother received mixed-to-positive reviews from television critics. Metacritic, which uses a weighted average, gave the first season a score of 69 out of 100 based on 25 reviews, signifying "generally favorable" reviews. On the review aggregator Rotten Tomatoes, 65% of 17 critics gave the season a positive reviews, with an average rating of 7.3/10. The consensus reads: "How I Met Your Mother begins with a distinctively likable ensemble, intriguing storytelling hook, and an endearingly sweet sensibility right out of the gate -- but the jokes elicit more smiles than laughs and the series' sentimentality may divide more hearts than it conquers.". Many critics compared the show to the recently concluded sitcom Friends, with some calling it a "worthy successor" and others a "well-executed ... rip-off". Including it on his annual "Best of Television" list, James Poniewozik of Time observed that "just a few episodes into the show's run, the writers know these characters inside and out". However, Poniewozik derided the premise of the show, Future Ted's narration, as a "gimmicky distraction". Hal Boedeker of The Orlando Sentinel disagreed, saying that "the twist should keep viewers coming back" and praises the five leads as "irresistible". The A.V. Club also called the premise "a winner" and the actors "appealing", but complained that the show stuck too closely to standard sitcom one-liners, as did Doug Elfman of the Chicago Sun-Times, who disparaged the script as little more than a series of "cheap jokes".

Robert Bianco from USA Today was more upbeat, praising the "fine cast" and "humorous script", and calling the show the "most inventive" of new series that year. The New York Times said that the show was "pleasant to watch" has "potential to improve", but will not "revolutionize" sitcoms or start a pop culture phenomenon. Charlie McCollum of The San Jose Mercury News writes that How I Met Your Mother was a prime candidate for replacing Friends in the sitcom category, praising the show as "something with real wit and considerable charm". He praised the writers for "giving a fresh spin to bits and pieces of the sitcom formula" and the cast for "hitting on all cylinders from the very first scene", predicting that the show could be an unexpected creative breakout with audiences.

=== Awards ===
The first season was nominated for four awards, winning two. Both wins were from the 58th Primetime Emmy Awards, where the show won the Outstanding Art Direction for a Multi-Camera Series and the Outstanding Cinematography for a Multi-Camera Series categories. In addition, the show was nominated for the People's Choice Awards for Favorite New Television Comedy and was recognized by the Casting Society of America for Best Comedy Pilot Casting.

== Release ==
=== Ratings ===
The first season garnered an average of 9.47 million viewers per all 22 episodes in the U.S. Out of all regular primetime programming that aired during the 2005–2006 American television season, How I Met Your Mother ranked 51st out of 156, according to the Nielsen ratings system. The pilot was watched by 10.94 million viewers, while the finale was watched by 8.64 million viewers.

=== Distribution ===
CBS premiered the show in the United States on September 19, 2005. Internationally, the show premiered in the United Kingdom on BBC Two on May 7, 2006, and is aired by Citytv in Canada and Seven Network in Australia. Season one also runs in syndication in the United States.

The first season was released on DVD in the U.S. under the name How I Met Your Mother Season One with the tagline "A Love Story in Reverse" on November 21, 2006, as a three-disc box set. The DVD cropped the original widescreen broadcast to a full frame 4:3 format, and no widescreen format has been released. The set was released in Region 2 on May 7, 2007, and Region 4 on January 10, 2007. Every episode in this season is available for purchase from the U.S. iTunes store.

== Episodes ==
Season one episodes
No. overall	No. in season	Title	Directed by	Written by	Original release date	Prod. code	US viewers (millions)
1	1	"Pilot"	Pamela Fryman	Carter Bays & Craig Thomas	September 19, 2005	1ALH79	10.94
After his best friend Marshall proposes to his long-term girlfriend, Lily, Ted solicits help from his friend Barney to find 'The One' for his life. He manages to get a date with Robin, a girl he met at his usual neighborhood bar, but threatens to scare Robin away when he accidentally reveals his love for her on the very first date. Meanwhile, Marshall accidentally hits Lily in the eye with the champagne stopper after they get engaged, forcing her to wear an eyepatch. The phrase olive theory is most known for its appearance in this "pilot" episode. In the scene, Ted tells the story of his first date with Robin to Lily and Marshall. Ted states that since he does not like olives but his date does, they are compatible. Lily and Marshall add on that the olive theory works in their relationship, as Marshall always gives Lily his olives. However, it is later said that Marshall only pretended not to like them to make Lily happy. Note: In March 2025, Radnor and Thomas, during their rewatch podcast "How We Made Your Mother", retconned the title of their Pilot episode in podcast episode "Howwww We Met Ted".
2	2	"Purple Giraffe"	Pamela Fryman	Carter Bays & Craig Thomas	September 26, 2005	1ALH01	10.40
In an attempt to repair his situation with Robin, Ted instead pursues a "casual" relationship with her by inviting her to a series of parties. Marshall tries to write an important 25-page law paper, but Ted's parties and Lily's post-engagement desire distracts him. Meanwhile, Barney tries to end a relationship he unknowingly started.
3	3	"Sweet Taste of Liberty"	Pamela Fryman	Phil Lord & Chris Miller	October 3, 2005	1ALH02	10.44
Ted agrees to deviate from his usual schedule by accompanying Barney on an unexpected trip to the airport. The excursion ultimately leads the two friends to Philadelphia, where they encounter difficulties with airport security. Meanwhile, Lily and Robin go out for drinks, but Lily becomes jealous when she is not as successful with men as Robin is, for which she blames her engagement ring. Marshall travels between both situations in an attempt to rectify the group's problems.
4	4	"Return of the Shirt"	Pamela Fryman	Kourtney Kang	October 10, 2005	1ALH03	9.84
Ted's continuing search for 'The One' leads him to look into his past to rekindle old flames. Unfortunately, the woman he is thinking of is the same woman he broke up with years ago on her birthday, and she still holds a grudge. Meanwhile, Barney dares Robin, the anchor of Metro News One, to slip questionable words or phrases into her daily newscast in return for money. Despite this, Robin begins to appreciate the importance of her job more.
5	5	"Okay Awesome"	Pamela Fryman	Chris Harris	October 17, 2005	1ALH04	10.14
Robin invites the group to a nightclub, but Marshall and Lily decide to host a wine and cheese party in an attempt to act more mature. Marshall and Lily quickly grow bored, however, and escape their own party in order to join the rest of the group at the nightclub, where they discover Robin outside, unable to gain re-entry into the club. Meanwhile, Ted and Barney experience unforeseen events while dancing.
6	6	"Slutty Pumpkin"	Pamela Fryman	Brenda Hsueh	October 24, 2005	1ALH05	10.89
Marshall and Lily are excited to participate in the couples costume competition at their usual bar. On the other hand, Robin's refusal to dress in a couple costume with her boyfriend puts stress on their new relationship. Meanwhile, Ted makes his annual visit to the rooftop Halloween party in search of a girl that he met four years ago.
7	7	"Matchmaker"	Pamela Fryman	Chris Marcil & Sam Johnson	November 7, 2005	1ALH07	10.55
Robin directs a skeptical Ted to an online matchmaking service with a 100% success rate. When the service gives Ted zero matches, Ted sneaks information out of the matchmaker's computer to visit an engaged dermatologist in an effort to debunk the prediction that there are no women out there for him. Meanwhile, Marshall and Lily become obsessed with chasing a strange and unusual critter out of their apartment.
8	8	"The Duel"	Pamela Fryman	Gloria Calderón Kellett	November 14, 2005	1ALH06	10.35
When Lily decides to formally move into Marshall and Ted's apartment, Barney warns a skeptical Ted that the couple will eventually force him out. When Ted discovers that Lily replaced his beloved, but beat-up, coffee pot with a brand new one, he begins to think that Barney is right. Meanwhile, Barney invents a new dating law and tries to convince others to use it.
9	9	"Belly Full of Turkey"	Pamela Fryman	Phil Lord & Chris Miller	November 21, 2005	1ALH09	10.29
Marshall and Lily visit the former's family in Minnesota for Thanksgiving, but Lily feels out of place with the large, loud, and rambunctious family. Meanwhile, Robin and Ted are surprised to find Barney as the Volunteer of the Year at a local soup kitchen. Ted is even more surprised as he begins to uncover unethical acts taking place behind the scenes of the charity.
10	10	"The Pineapple Incident"	Pamela Fryman	Carter Bays & Craig Thomas	November 28, 2005	1ALH08	12.27
After Ted passes out after an especially wild night in town, he wakes up the next morning with a sprained ankle, a burnt jacket, a girl in his bed, and a pineapple in his room. Unable to recall everything that transpired over the course of the evening, he asks his friends and the girl in his bed, Trudy, to fill him in on the night's misadventures.
11	11	"The Limo"	Pamela Fryman	Sam Johnson & Chris Marcil	December 19, 2005	1ALH10	10.36
For New Year's Eve, Ted surprises his friends by hiring a limo to take them on an excursion through New York City's nightlife. Robin brings her new boyfriend, and the rest of the group each has a favored party that they each want to attend before the night is over. As the night progresses, the group picks up and loses people as the limo travels through the city. As the clock ticks closer to midnight, the limo gets stuck in traffic on the way to the last party.
12	12	"The Wedding"	Pamela Fryman	Kourtney Kang	January 9, 2006	1ALH11	11.49
Ted's decision to bring Robin as his date to a friend's wedding leads to an argument between the bride and the groom that abruptly ends the wedding. Ted and Marshall comfort the bride and groom and urge them to resume the wedding. They agree, but a last-minute opportunity at work leads Robin to unexpectedly cancel, leaving Ted to go alone.
13	13	"Drumroll, Please"	Pamela Fryman	Gloria Calderón Kellett	January 23, 2006	1ALH12	10.82
Ted finds himself attracted to a mysterious woman whom he meets at the wedding. Unable to find her the next morning, Ted enlists the help of Barney in an effort to track her down. Meanwhile, Robin reveals that she left work early and saw Ted and the mysterious girl together the previous night, and has to confront her own feelings for Ted.
14	14	"Zip, Zip, Zip"	Pamela Fryman	Brenda Hsueh	February 6, 2006	1ALH13	10.94
After initially agreeing to take things slowly, Ted and Victoria abruptly change course when they discover that Victoria will be out of town for their one-month anniversary. As they experience a series of milestones, Marshall and Lily wonder if their long relationship is out of milestones. Meanwhile, Robin decides to be Barney's "bro" for a guy's night out together.
15	15	"Game Night"	Pamela Fryman	Chris Harris	February 27, 2006	1ALH14	9.82
When Lily chances upon Barney's first girlfriend, Shannon, the gang all relive their most embarrassing moments in order to persuade Barney to finish talking about his first relationship. Back when Barney was dating Shannon, he was a devoted boyfriend. However, when Shannon fabricated a story in order to leave Barney for a wealthier, better-dressed man, Barney was devastated. After a short period of sulking, Barney reinvented himself and his outlook on life to become who he is today.
16	16	"Cupcake"	Pamela Fryman	Maria Ferrari	March 6, 2006	1ALH15	10.15
Just as things are going well between Ted and Victoria, the latter is offered a surprising but incredible opportunity to be a fellow at a culinary institute in Germany. Lily invites Robin and Victoria to go wedding dress shopping with her, with some poor results after Lily destroys a $8,000 wedding dress. Marshall gets an interview for an internship with Barney's firm, and accepts an offer from Barney to get a friends and family discount from his suit tailor. After Marshall discovers the bill, and Lily tells him of the wedding dress fiasco, he goes on the interview. Ted and Victoria decide to give long distance a try.
17	17	"Life Among the Gorillas"	Pamela Fryman	Carter Bays & Craig Thomas	March 20, 2006	1ALH16	9.80
Marshall and Lily have an argument over Marshall's new job at Barney's firm, which Lily alleges is having a negative effect on his values. Meanwhile, Ted feels guilty for not sending Victoria as many care packages as she has, and asks Robin for advice on maintaining his long-distance relationship. That evening, as Ted worries that Victoria is going to break up with him, he receives a call from Robin, asking to hang out.
18	18	"Nothing Good Happens After 2 A.M."	Pamela Fryman	Carter Bays & Craig Thomas	April 10, 2006	1ALH17	7.65
When Ted receives an ominous message from Victoria asking saying she wants "to talk", Ted becomes convinced that he is about to be dumped. That evening, Robin invites Ted to her flat to hang out. Lily and Marshall try to dissuade Ted from going, but inadvertently give him more reason to go. Meanwhile, Barney tries to persuade Lily and Marshall to join him in a "legendary night out".
19	19	"Mary the Paralegal"	Pamela Fryman	Chris Harris	April 24, 2006	1ALH18	7.60
Robin invites the group to an awards banquet in which she is being honored for her newscasts. At the banquet, Barney convinces Ted that his date is actually a prostitute that he hired, while Ted also struggles with seeing Robin with her co-worker.
20	20	"Best Prom Ever"	Pamela Fryman	Ira Ungerleider	May 1, 2006	1ALH19	7.24
When Lily and Marshall's dream wedding venue has a sudden opening two months earlier than their planned wedding date, the couple scramble to decide on wedding arrangements. In order to preview a band that they are considering hiring, the group sneak into a high school prom where the band is performing. As they dance to the band, Ted and Robin decide to try to repair their friendship.
21	21	"Milk"	Pamela Fryman	Carter Bays & Craig Thomas	May 8, 2006	1ALH20	8.07
The matchmaking service finally returns with a match for Ted, but he puts his date with his "perfect woman" on hold as he decides whether or not he still has feelings for Robin. At the office, Barney enlists Marshall's help to prank a man who works in the building across the street. Meanwhile, Lily applies for an art fellowship in San Francisco without telling Marshall, even though it could ruin their wedding plans.
22	22	"Come On"	Pamela Fryman	Carter Bays & Craig Thomas	May 15, 2006	1ALH21	8.64
Ted ultimately decides that he wants to pursue Robin instead of the woman at the matchmaking service, and ultimately tries to win her heart by going to great lengths to romance her. Meanwhile, Marshall worries about his relationship with Lily when he learns of her acceptance to the art fellowship in San Francisco. As Ted tries to learn a rain dance in order to impress Robin, Marshall discovers that Lily left him for the fellowship.
