= The Limo (How I Met Your Mother) =

- How I Met Your Mother episode
- Episode no.: Season 1 Episode 11
- Directed by: Pamela Fryman
- Written by: Sam Johnson & Chris Marcil
- Production code: 1ALH10
- Original air date: December 19, 2005

Guest appearances
- Lyndsy Fonseca as Daughter; David Henrie as Son; Marshall Manesh as Ranjit; J. P. Manoux as Not Moby / Eric; James Tupper as Derek; Kathleen Rose Perkins as Marybeth; Natalie Denise Sperl as Natalya

Episode chronology
← Previous "The Pineapple Incident"	Next → "The Wedding"
- How I Met Your Mother season 1

"The Limo" is the 11th episode in the first season of the American sitcom How I Met Your Mother. The episode was written by Sam Johnson and Chris Marcil and was directed by Pamela Fryman.

"The Limo" stars Josh Radnor as Ted Mosby alongside Neil Patrick Harris, Jason Segel, Cobie Smulders, Alyson Hannigan. It first aired on CBS on December 19, 2005 to an audience of 10.36 million viewers.

== Plot ==
Trying to avoid the usual letdown of New Year's Eve, Ted rents a limo for the group. Robin has plans with her boyfriend, Derek. Ted, Lily, Marshall, and Barney plan to attend 5 parties before midnight, finding the best party to be at. The group goes to party 1, picking up Ted's coworker, Marybeth (who Ted might be interested in, and who seems to like Ted as well). Barney also finds a date named Natalya. Lily complains that her shoes are hurting her feet, but the group disregards this and heads to party 2.

Disappointed with party 2, the gang heads to party 3, leaving Natalya behind. Robin calls Ted and asks if they can pick her up. Robin joins the group, and Ted suggests they go to Gray's Papaya. Lily returns to the apartment to change her shoes, intending to meet the group later.

The limo heads to party 3 when Marshall sees Moby out the window of the parked limo. Moby then rides to his party with the group. Marshall leaves the limo to find Lily. The group heads to Moby's party but discovers that he is not Moby. As they drop off Not Moby at his party, Marshall's phone, which was accidentally left in the limo, rings. Barney answers the call from Lily and tells her that Marshall is looking for her at party 3. Lily then sees Not Moby walking into the party and flees. When she rejoins the group, they realize Lily accidentally went to party 4. The group heads to party 3.

The limo gets a flat tire, prompting Marybeth to leave the group after making some observations to Ted about Ted and Robin. With 15 minutes until midnight, the group begins walking to party 3. As Lily tries to find Marshall, Barney tells Ted to stop trying to improve New Year's Eve. Just before Ted gives up, they hear Marshall, who runs to the limo. He reveals that when he could not find Lily at party 3, he walked to party 4. Marshall then went to party 5 and convinces the group that it's the best party, and they head to it. The limo is stuck in traffic; the group accepts they will not make it to party 5, so Ted opens a bottle of champagne and pours everyone a glass. Derek appears at the limo's window. As the countdown begins, everyone in the limo is paired off except for Ted, who leaves the limo. Robin follows him, and they kiss.

== Production ==
=== Development and filming ===
The episode is a bottle episode meaning it is set in one location. The episode was reportedly one of the most difficult of the season to film.

=== Casting ===
The episode features principal cast members Josh Radnor, Neil Patrick Harris, Jason Segel, Cobie Smulders, and Alyson Hannigan as Ted Mosby, Barney Stinson, Marshall Eriksen, Robin Scherbatsky, and Lily Aldrin respectively. Additionally Bob Saget voices a future of Ted, but goes uncredited.

The guest cast includes Lyndsy Fonseca and David Henrie as Ted's children and Marshall Manesh as Ranjit, All three of whom reprise their roles from earlier in the season. J. P. Manoux appears Eric who the group mistake for the musician Moby. James Tupper also guest stars as Robin's boyfriend Derek.

The episode features the Bon Jovi song "You Give Love a Bad Name".

== Release ==
=== Broadcast ===
"The Limo" was first aired in the United States on CBS on December 19, 2005. It was watched by 10.36 million viewers.

=== Award ===
For his efforts on the episode, Director of Photography Chris La Fountaine won a Primetime Emmy Award for Outstanding Cinematography for a Multi-Camera Series.
