= Mary the Paralegal =

- How I Met Your Mother episode
- Episode no.: Season 1 Episode 19
- Directed by: Pamela Fryman
- Written by: Chris Harris
- Cinematography by: Christian La Fountaine
- Editing by: Kirk Benson
- Production code: 1ALH18
- Original air date: April 24, 2006

Guest appearances
- Erinn Bartlett as Mary; Alexis Denisof as Sandy Rivers; Robert Michael Morris as Vampire Lou

Episode chronology
← Previous "Nothing Good Happens After 2 A.M."	Next → "Best Prom Ever"
- How I Met Your Mother season 1

"Mary the Paralegal" is the 19th episode in the first season of the television series How I Met Your Mother. It originally aired on April 24, 2006 on CBS.

== Plot ==
A story that Robin did on her news channel was nominated for a Local Area Media Award (or as Lily calls it, a LAMA – pronounced LAME-a), and Robin has invited everyone to come to the awards banquet. Since she notified everyone three months in advance, Ted told her he would be bringing Victoria. Right before the awards banquet, Ted ends his relationship with Victoria and ruins his chances with Robin simultaneously, and he wonders if he should still bring a date. Barney suggests getting Ted a prostitute as a date, which Ted immediately dismisses. Barney shows up a bit later with a stunning blonde-haired woman named Mary for Ted, telling Ted and Marshall that she is a prostitute. Ted again refuses until he sees Robin's date for the banquet: Sandy Rivers, who reads the newspaper on the news show every morning, requests that he always be called by his full name. Ted then agrees, making Mary his date for the evening.

At the banquet, Ted finds himself more and more attracted to Mary, who says she is a paralegal at a law firm downtown. Ted tries to talk to Robin to restore their friendship but fails. Robin won the award and thanked all her friends, except Ted, for coming and supporting her. Meanwhile, Barney has a room for Ted in the hotel for the night, and Ted is considering whether he and Mary should go to the room. Marshall tries to stop him unsuccessfully. Ted and Mary head to the room while Robin and Sandy Rivers get a cab. Shortly afterward, Robin returns, reiterating that she does not date co-workers and only brought Sandy Rivers to make Ted jealous. Marshall tells her that Ted brought Mary to make Robin jealous. Marshall then telepathically tells Lily that Mary is a prostitute, and Lily, who is asleep, wakes up and asks if Mary is indeed an escort. After a minute, Barney reveals that Mary is not a prostitute but a paralegal who lives in his building (having told Ted and Marshall that she was one as a prank). Ted does not know this, and Mary eventually slaps him and leaves when Ted insists that she's a prostitute.

At the bar, Barney insists to Ted that he got on so well with Mary, the 'paralegal,' because he thought he was on to a sure thing anyway. But Ted reveals that he's had the last laugh by never checking out of the hotel room and leaves to increase the already hefty bill on Barney's credit card.

== Critical response ==
Critic Ryan J Budke of TV Squad enjoyed the episode and praised it for being "true to life" in the way the characters relate to each other, noting everyone has someone they can have a "telepathic" conversation with.
