= The Pineapple Incident =

- How I Met Your Mother episode
- Episode no.: Season 1 Episode 10
- Directed by: Pamela Fryman
- Written by: Carter Bays & Craig Thomas
- Production code: 1ALH08
- Original air date: November 28, 2005

Guest appearances
- Danica McKellar as Trudy; Joe Nieves as Carl

Episode chronology
← Previous "Belly Full of Turkey"	Next → "The Limo"
- How I Met Your Mother season 1

"The Pineapple Incident" is the tenth episode in the first season of the television series How I Met Your Mother. It originally aired on November 28, 2005 on CBS. It is the highest viewed episode in season 1 and the second highest overall episode during the nine seasons of How I Met Your Mother.

The series follows Ted Mosby (Josh Radnor and Bob Saget) in 2030 as he recounts the story of how he met his wife to his children. In this episode, Ted, who wakes up hungover, tries to recount the events of previous night with the help of his friends, Barney Stinson (Neil Patrick Harris), Robin Scherbatsky (Cobie Smulders), Marshall Eriksen (Jason Segel) and Lily Aldrin (Alyson Hannigan), who is engaged to Marshall. The episode uses a nonchronological format, with the episode frequently flashing-back to the events of the previous night

It is never revealed where the titular pineapple came from, although in a deleted scene from the final season, it is revealed that Ted stole the pineapple from The Captain's porch.

== Plot ==
At MacLaren's, Barney, Marshall, and Lily criticize Ted for overthinking every aspect of his life, rather than simply acting on a whim. Barney convinces Ted to take 5 shots of bartender Carl's unique blend called "Red Dragon;" Ted claims that he can still function cognitively even under the influence of alcohol, but shortly afterward, he blacks out. He wakes up the following day with a girl he does not remember beside him in bed, a pineapple on his nightstand, a sprained ankle, and his coat partially burnt. Ted asks Marshall and Lily about the night, and they tell him that he sang along with the jukebox in the bar ("Voices" by Cheap Trick) while standing on a table. He also repeatedly drunk dialed Robin, who was on a date with a wealthy businessman. He fell off the table, spraining his ankle, and Marshall and Lily took him to bed.

Ted calls Barney, thinking he might know what happened the night before, but finds him sprawled in their bathtub. Barney recounts that Ted reappeared at the bar around 1 a.m., but when he began to call Robin again, Barney lit Ted's coat on fire. After some more time at the bar, he puts Ted back into bed, although he has no idea who the mystery girl is. Ted finds that someone has written on his arm, saying to call the number if Ted is found passed out somewhere. Ted calls the number and reaches Carl, who fills in more of the story: Ted returns to the bar at 3 a.m., but Carl refuses to serve him. Ted then suddenly calls someone and tells her to come over and do something "crazy." Based on this information, Marshall, Lily, and Barney believe that the mysterious girl in Ted's bed is Robin, but as Ted wakes her up, Robin calls and tells him she is coming over to discuss the previous night.

The girl in bed, Trudy, wakes up and explains her side of the story: she had seen Ted's drunken dancing, and they exchanged numbers in the ladies' room of the bar, which Ted had entered accidentally. It was she whom he later called and invited over, not Robin. Ted tells Trudy to hide when Robin comes over to talk, and Trudy leaves via the fire escape before Ted can show her to Robin to prove that he has moved on. Future Ted explains that Trudy never responded to his subsequent message and never worked out where the pineapple came from, but it was delicious.

== Production ==
Carter Bays later admitted he learned a lesson from this episode to not write themselves into a corner. The line "we never found out where the pineapple came from" was something they never should have said.

The mystery of the pineapple was solved in a deleted scene from the season 9 episode "Daisy". The scene was released online by BuzzFeed. In the clip, The Captain has a pineapple on his porch, and explains to the gang that he practices the tradition of putting one outside as a "symbol of hospitality". This leads Ted to remember stealing an identical pineapple from The Captain's house when he was very drunk. The scene was later referenced in the spin-off series How I Met Your Father. Danica McKellar guest stars as Trudy, and reappears in 'The Third Wheel.'

== Release ==
=== Critical reception ===
The episode was very popular with critics, and has consistently ranked highly on many lists of the best How I Met Your Mother episode. In a 2014 ranking for IGN Max Nicholson placed the episode as the show’s third best episode, whilst Andrew McGowan of Variety placed the episode fourth. Both lists ranked the episode as the best of season 1.
