= The Wedding (How I Met Your Mother) =

- How I Met Your Mother episode
- Episode no.: Season 1 Episode 12
- Directed by: Pamela Fryman
- Written by: Kourtney Kang
- Production code: 1ALH11
- Original air date: January 9, 2006

Guest appearances
- Ashley Williams as Victoria; Virginia Williams as Claudia; Matt Boren as Stuart

Episode chronology
← Previous "The Limo"	Next → "Drumroll, Please"
- How I Met Your Mother season 1

"The Wedding" is the 12th episode in the first season of the television series How I Met Your Mother. It originally aired on January 9, 2006 on CBS.

== Plot ==
In 2006, Ted frets about finding a date for his friends Claudia and Stuart's wedding; when Robin breaks up with Derek, Ted invites her to the wedding, and she accepts. But when Ted runs into Claudia two days before the wedding and mentions that he is bringing a date, Claudia tells him that he indicated on his RSVP card that he would be coming alone and angrily forbids him from bringing a date. Ted tries to tell Robin that he will not be able to take her to the wedding but chickens out when he sees Robin in the dress she bought.

When he tells Lily his problem, she, against Marshall's advice, suggests that Ted appeal to Stuart, who permits Ted without a second thought. Ted is excitedly anticipating his romantic evening with Robin when Claudia calls to say that the wedding has been canceled: the issue of Ted's date led to a huge argument, and the couple broke up. Concerned about their friend and not wanting to disappoint Robin, who looks forward to the wedding, Marshall and Ted talk to Stuart, and Lily comforts Claudia at MacLaren's.

Stuart tells Ted and Marshall he is relieved the wedding is off and misses being single. Ted tries to reassure Stuart that everyone has doubts about commitment, but those doubts should not keep him from getting married; however, Marshall tells Stuart that he should not marry Claudia unless he is sure he wants to. Meanwhile, at MacLaren's, Barney finds Claudia waiting for Lily and immediately tries to seduce her, offering fake sympathy and alcohol. Lily pulls Barney away from Claudia and threatens him just as Stuart arrives with Ted and Marshall. Because of Marshall's words, Stuart apologizes to Claudia, and they get back together. After a few more drinks, which Ted prompted by asking the question that caused this whole mess again, Claudia finally agrees to allow Ted to bring a date.

On the night of the wedding, Ted arrives at Robin's apartment to pick her up, but just before they leave, Robin receives a phone call from her producer, offering her the opportunity to anchor the news that evening. Though disappointed, Ted tells her to go to work. Ted goes to the wedding alone, and Claudia shows him his RSVP, which he checked in the "coming alone" box. Thinking the mistake reveals that he has given up on finding someone, Ted tells Barney that he is ready just to be single; suddenly, he locks eyes with a pretty woman across the room.

== Reception ==
Victoria (Ashley Williams)'s first appearance on the show occurs at the end of the episode. Ted's first serious girlfriend on the show became popular with fans, defeating Robin Scherbatsky in a 2010 online poll held by the show to determine Ted's most popular ex-girlfriend. In 2011, co-creator Carter Bays stated:

There have been a lot of girls. But you really could count on one hand the ones that really had this kind of indefinable chemistry with Josh [Radnor], and Ashley's right at the top of that list. There’s something about that story and those actors together that first season that really was something special. We knew it at the time, and in the six years since then, nothing has quite… Great other ladies have come and gone in Ted's life, but Victoria was always someone very special. We knew we wanted to see a little more to that story.
