= Nothing Good Happens After 2 A.M. =

- How I Met Your Mother episode
- Episode no.: Season 1 Episode 18
- Directed by: Pamela Fryman
- Written by: Craig Thomas and Carter Bays
- Production code: 1ALH17
- Original air date: April 10, 2006

Guest appearances
- Ashley Williams as Victoria; Alexis Denisof as Sandy Rivers; George Kee Cheung as Korean Elvis; Cailey Jones as Kindergarten Student; Lawrence Mandley as Cab Driver #1; Wajid as Cab Driver #2 (uncredited)

Episode chronology
← Previous "Life Among the Gorillas"	Next → "Mary the Paralegal"
- How I Met Your Mother season 1

"Nothing Good Happens After 2 A.M." is the 18th episode of the first season of the television series How I Met Your Mother. It originally aired on April 10, 2006 on CBS.

== Plot ==
Future Ted tells his children of a saying his mother used: "Nothing good ever happens after 2 a.m." He then picks up his narrative from where the previous episode left off, having just returned home from a karaoke club and received a call from Robin.

Earlier that day, Robin does a presentation on her career with Lily's class but gets defensive when the children ask about her romantic life instead. Robin's feelings of loneliness are amplified when her co-anchor, Sandy Rivers, tells her that they should have sex. When she returns home, she drinks a large glass of wine and calls Ted, who has been waiting for a phone call from Victoria. Ted worries that Victoria will break up with him, but he has been feeling anxious waiting for her to call him. When Robin calls, he agrees to go to her apartment. Still, his attempts to rationalize his decision are undermined when he begins conversing with his conscience, which appears personified as Victoria. When Ted consults Marshall and Lily, they both attempt to dissuade him, but Lily unwittingly encourages him when she says Robin has feelings for Ted.

When Ted arrives at Robin's apartment, he lies about breaking up with Victoria, and they begin kissing. Ted goes to the bathroom to think about his situation. When he convinces himself that it is all right to sleep with Robin, he finds that he has mixed up Robin's phone with his. He emerges from the bathroom just as an upset Robin gets off his phone with Victoria, who has called at last. Robin tosses Ted's phone back at him and tells him to leave and call Victoria back. Victoria breaks up with Ted over the phone, and as Ted and Robin sleep alone in their respective bedrooms, Future Ted reminds his kids that nothing good happens after 2 a.m. and admits that lying to Robin was the stupidest thing he ever did.

Meanwhile, Barney attempts to prove to Lily and Marshall that good things can happen after 2 a.m. when they try to leave a karaoke bar early. Barney invites a Korean Elvis impersonator to come with the group to MacLaren's. When Korean Elvis tries to convince them to stay, he whispers something in Lily's ear, which causes her to knee him in the groin. Future Ted claims that Barney was right and the night was "legendary."

== Critical response ==
The TV Critic rated the episode 66 out of 100, describing the episode as "a very traditional mid season will they-won’t they romance story", but stating that it was "effective nonetheless".
