= Belly Full of Turkey =

- How I Met Your Mother episode
- Episode no.: Season 1 Episode 9
- Directed by: Pamela Fryman
- Written by: Phil Lord and Chris Miller
- Production code: 1ALH09
- Original air date: November 21, 2005

Guest appearances
- Lyndsy Fonseca as Daughter; David Henrie as Son; Bill Fagerbakke as Marvin Eriksen Sr.; Suzie Plakson as Judy Eriksen; Elizabeth Bogush as Amanda

Episode chronology
← Previous "The Duel"	Next → "The Pineapple Incident"
- How I Met Your Mother season 1

"Belly Full of Turkey" is the ninth episode in the first season of the television series How I Met Your Mother. It originally aired on CBS on November 21, 2005.

== Plot ==
Marshall and Lily visit Marshall's family in St. Cloud, Minnesota for Thanksgiving. Marshall plays a game of "bask-ice-ball" (a no-rules, brawling combination of basketball and ice hockey that the Eriksen family invented) with his father and older brothers. At the same time, Lily helps her future sister-in-law and mother-in-law in the kitchen. The talk turns to babies, and Mrs. Eriksen reveals that her first-born son was abnormally almost 15 pounds at birth; this frightens Lily, who is dwarfed not only by Marshall, the shortest of his brothers at 6'4", but his entire family, and she fears the idea of trying to give birth to at least one baby that size.

At dinner, Lily argues with Marshall and the Eriksens when she reveals she does not want to change her surname after the wedding or raise their kids in Minnesota. Increasingly worked up, she drives off to a convenience store, where she is arrested for public urination. Marshall goes to the station and discovers Lily has used a home pregnancy test. Lily tells him of her concerns about raising a family of "mayonnaise-guzzling giants in Minnesota," but Marshall, faced with the very real possibility of having a child, assures her that they will not settle down in Minnesota and alleviates Lily's fears. Suddenly, an officer walks in and holds out Lily's possessions, which include the pregnancy test. They find out that Lily is not pregnant and return to the Eriksens' home, much relieved. The Thanksgiving dinner concludes amicably.

Meanwhile, Robin and Ted have no plans for Thanksgiving and decide to help out at a soup kitchen. When they arrive, they are shocked to find Barney volunteering there already, highly regarded as one of the best volunteers on staff. The organizer tells Ted and Robin that they have enough volunteers, but after Barney vouches for them, they are allowed to help. Soon after, they discover that not all the food received as donations to the soup kitchen are distributed to the needy; many volunteers selfishly take the better, more expensive donations for themselves. As Ted complains to Barney about this, he discovers that Barney has been working there as a mandatory community service after being arrested for public urination in the judge's church and has become the volunteer of the year.

Ted, determined to be selfless, begins to distribute the rare food items to the needy, which results in him, Robin, and Barney being kicked out of the kitchen. To make it up to an irate Barney, Ted, and Robin go with him to the Lusty Leopard strip club, which has a Thanksgiving buffet. Ted pays for a homeless man to get a lap dance, which he realizes is the one act of charity he performed on Thanksgiving. Another stripper named Tracy (Katie A. Keane) introduces herself to Ted and compliments him on his generosity. Ted tells his kids that is "the story of how I met your mother," shocking them before Ted reveals, to their relief, that he is joking.

== Foreshadowing ==
Ted's kids are shocked when, after telling them of his meeting a stripper named Tracy, he says "And that, kids, is the true story of how I met your mother." Although he was joking, this led many fans to believe that The Mother's real name was Tracy based on his kids' shocked reactions. It was confirmed in the series finale that Ted's wife's name is Tracy.

== Reception ==
According to statistics gathered by USDISH it is one of the most popular TV show episodes during the holiday season. CBR called the episode the series best Thanksgiving episode, saying, "Without the unrelated gimmick to overshadow the character development, "Belly Full of Turkey" was able to actually explore the meaning of the holiday, the idea of family and its characters more than any subsequent attempts."
