= Maggie (The Afterparty episode) =

- The Afterparty episode
- Episode no.: Season 1 Episode 8
- Directed by: Christopher Miller
- Written by: Christopher Miller
- Cinematography by: Carl Herse
- Editing by: Joel Negron; Nick Olah
- Original air date: March 4, 2022
- Running time: 35 minutes

Guest appearances
- Will Forte as himself; Reid Scott as Aldrin Germain; Mel Rodriguez as Captain Ostrander

Episode chronology
← Previous "Danner"	Next → "Aniq 2: The Sequel"

"Maggie", also known as "WhoDannert?", is the eighth episode and first season finale of the American murder mystery comedy television series The Afterparty. The episode was written and directed by series creator Christopher Miller, and was released on Apple TV+ on March 4, 2022.

The series follows the events that follow a high school reunion after-party ending in a murder, where everyone is a suspect, as Detective Danner interviews the various suspects present, having her tell them their "mind-movies" about the night in question and the events leading up to it. The episode follows Danner as she interviews Brett's and Zoë's young daughter Maggie, who recounts the night's events in the style of a children's show, leading Danner to finally confirm who killed Xavier.

The episode received positive reviews from critics, who praised Ben Schwartz's performance as well as Miller's directing, writing, editing, and cinematography as strong points, for which he was nominated for Best Writing in a Streaming Series, Comedy for the episode at the 2022 Hollywood Critics Association TV Awards. On March 2, 2022, a second season was ordered, premiering its first two episodes, "Aniq 2: The Sequel" and "Grace", on July 12, 2023.

== Plot ==
Danner's final questioning is with Maggie (Everly Carganilla), who tells her recollection of the night in the style of an animated children's show. Maggie only snuck into the afterparty to retrieve her toy koala bear that Brett (Ike Barinholtz) took from her, but also decided to draw on Aniq's face. After playing hide and seek, Brett puts her back in the car, only for Maggie to hear Jennifer #2 go into labor.

After Maggie's story is done, Danner (Tiffany Haddish) gathers the guests in the main living room to reveal who killed Xavier (Dave Franco). She seemingly reveals to the group that Brett is the murderer, but Aniq (Sam Richardson) quickly steps in to defend him, despite this meaning that he would be the only other suspect left. However, Danner reveals her accusation of Brett was false: both a test for Aniq's character, and so she could confirm that he wasn't an accomplice to the true murderer: Yasper (Ben Schwartz).

After being harshly turned down by Xavier when Yasper asked to "bless" his music, a bitter Yasper used the loud videos to distract everyone while he tricked Xavier into coming up into the bedroom. Yasper confronted Xavier for stealing his ideas and punched him in the face, before throwing him off the balcony in a fit of rage. Once Yasper stole Xavier's phone, he used it to text his own phone to create an alibi, and he remotely erased the security camera recordings (Note: As depicted in "Yasper".) so his actions could not be uncovered.

When the phone is exposed, Yasper admits to his jealousy over Xavier's success that he felt he deserved. He is promptly arrested after attempting to flee and being tackled by Culp (John Early). As morning comes, everyone goes their separate ways; Danner brags to Ostrander (Mel Rodriguez) and Germain (Reid Scott) that she's solved the case, Yasper is overjoyed to see the press gathering to watch his arrest, while Aniq and Zoë (Zoë Chao) confess their feelings for each other and kiss.

== Production ==
=== Development ===
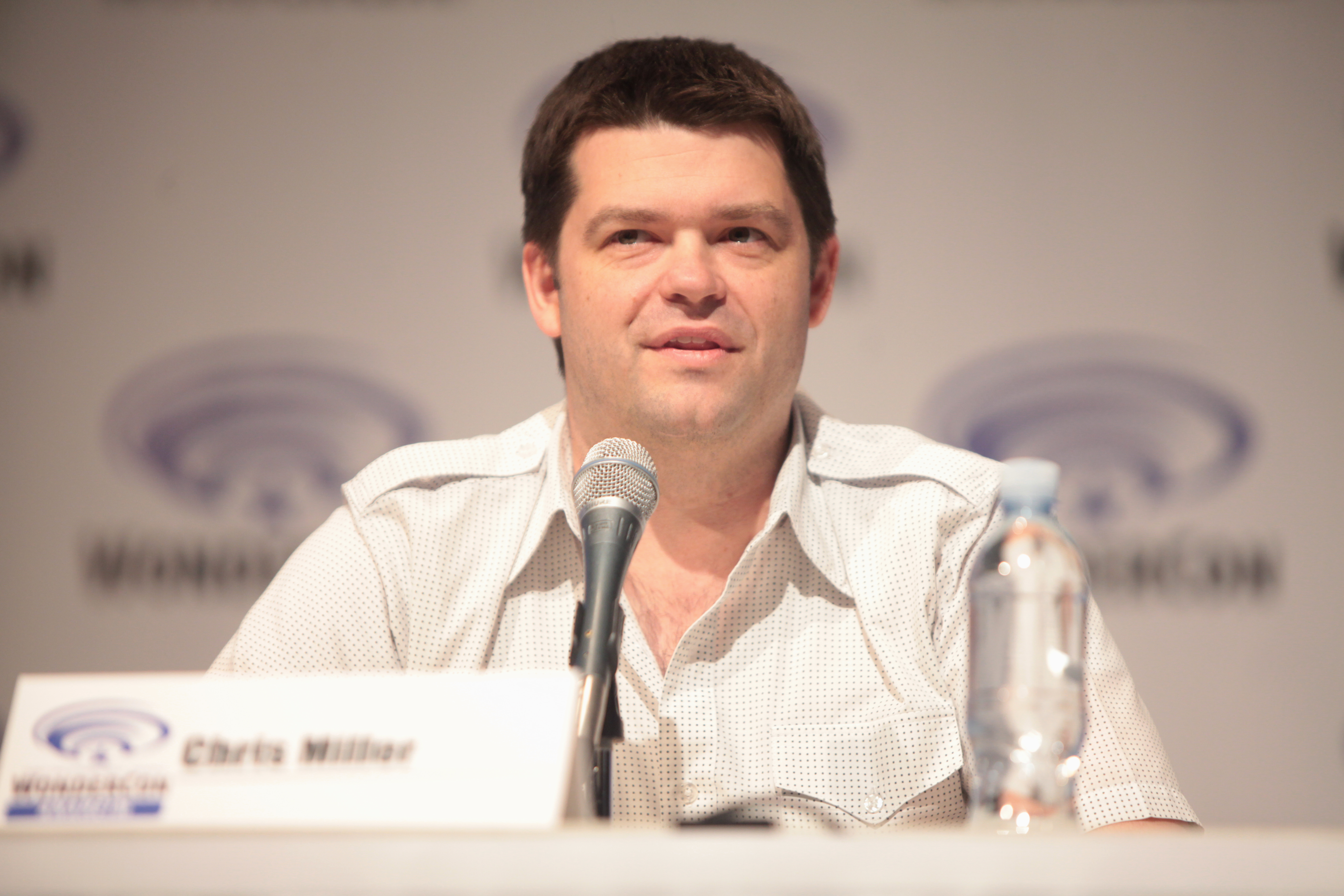
Series creator Christopher Miller wrote and directed the episode.

Christopher Miller conceived of The Afterparty in the early 2010s, where he wanted to make a murder mystery showing the different perspectives of the murder from its witnesses, inspired by his love of the murder-mystery genre and Akira Kurosawa's Rashomon. The high school reunion aspect was added after Miller attended a high school reunion himself, thinking it would be a unique setting for such a concept. Miller initially wrote it as a feature-length screenplay on his own while he was making Cloudy with a Chance of Meatballs and 21 Jump Street with Lord. In June 2013, the project was set-up at Sony Pictures as a film titled The Reunion, with Miller as sole writer and director, while producing the film along with Lord, Jonathan Kadin, and Hannah Minghella. However, the film never came to fruition due to commitments with The Lego Movie and 22 Jump Street. Lord and Miller were still optimistic in making The Reunion while promoting The Lego Movie, so when Miller considered making the project in later hears, he made the decision to make it as a mini-series. Miller felt that expanding the concept into a series would allow him to properly develop the characters. Doing so also gave Miller the idea to present each version of the event as a separate genre in line with the respective POV's of each witness, called "mind-movies" in the series itself.

On June 24, 2020, it was announced that Apple TV+ had given the production an eight-episode straight-to-series order, now titled The Afterparty. The series is created by Miller who is also the showrunner and is expected to executive produce alongside Lord while Aubrey Lee is a producer. Production companies involved with the series were slated to consist of Sony Pictures Television and TriStar Television. Up until the release of "Maggie", the episode was originally titled "WhoDannert?", a portmanteau of Tiffany Haddish's Detective Danner and the phrase "whodunnit" (a colloquial elision of "Who [has] done it?"), with the script being released on June 3, 2022.

=== Casting ===
In November 2020, the cast was announced, including Tiffany Haddish, Sam Richardson, Ben Schwartz, Ike Barinholtz, Ilana Glazer and Dave Franco, Schwartz having been told of his character's ultimate fate from the get-go.

=== Filming ===
On November 11, 2020, Miller, in an Instagram post, confirmed that filming for the series had officially begun. Miller directed "Maggie" and all eight episodes in the series, making it the first time he had directed separately since his collaborations with Phil Lord.

== Reception ==
=== Critical response ===
"Maggie" received extremely positive reviews from critics. Mary Littlejohn of TV Fanatic called the episode "a satisfying conclusion to a meticulously planned, incredibly entertaining series", in particular praising Everly Carganilla's performance as being "as adorable as child actors get [with her] line delivery [being] spot-on". Rating the episode "10/10", Christian Hubbard of Full Circle Cinema similarly praised Carganilla's "high levels of charisma and wit in this episode well beyond her years", stating that "the young actress impresses with the screentime she receives early on", lauding the overall episode as "a genuinely satisfying conclusion".

Jordan Lyon of Ready Steady Cut called the episode "excellent end to a brilliant series", while Jordan Williams of Screen Rant praised the episode's ending for "bring[ing] together some of the most common themes that occur when people are confronted with their past [and] displace the blame onto others, particularly onto those who succeeded in the exact manner they envisioned for themselves", with the ending's "significance tie[d] into the dangers of the pursuit of fame and obsession with celebrity [while] also preach[ing] the importance of facing one's past in order to move forward. Each character attends the reunion for a specific reason, typically to get another shot in terms of where they felt they fell short in life, try to get revenge for past conflicts, or prove how far they have come since their youth. The Afterparty's season 1 ending recalls how integral one’s high school years are to their future life and how easy it can be to revert to a youthful state of mind at a reunion. After 15 years, The Afterparty's characters, like Ike Barinholtz's Brett, are confronted head-on with their successes and failures, with such an event being a catalyst for these figures to bring out the worst and best in themselves. Just like real high school reunions, every suspect in The Afterparty is telling the story they want to tell in terms of how they wish to be perceived, but underneath these surface narratives are often lies to make themselves look better. However, The Afterparty's ending suggests that only when the characters are honest with themselves do they truly get the second chance they desire". Joan Kubicek of Vulture similarly called the episode "a ska-pe dre-am", lauding its "juicy unveiling" scene and "happy ending", and The Envoy Web lauding the "truth behind the killer ha[ving] a decent amount of suspense right till the end [and the] comic element of the series [being] maintained right till the end, [with] the reveal [being] detailed and mak[ing] sense".

=== Accolades ===
Year	Award	Category	Nominee(s)	Result	Ref.
2022	Hollywood Critics Association TV Awards	Best Writing in a Streaming Series, Comedy	Christopher Miller	Nominated	

At the 2022 Hollywood Critics Association TV Awards, Christopher Miller was nominated for Best Writing in a Streaming Series, Comedy for "Maggie".
