= The Afterparty (TV series) =

American murder mystery comedy television series

- Genre: Anthology; Murder mystery; Comedy
- Created by: Christopher Miller
- Showrunners: Christopher Miller; Anthony King
- Starring: Tiffany Haddish; Sam Richardson; Zoë Chao; Season 1: Ike Barinholtz; Ben Schwartz; Ilana Glazer; Jamie Demetriou; Dave Franco; Season 2: John Cho; Paul Walter Hauser; Ken Jeong; Anna Konkle; Poppy Liu; Elizabeth Perkins; Jack Whitehall; Zach Woods; Vivian Wu
- Music by: Daniel Pemberton; David Schweitzer (season 2)
- Country of origin: United States
- Original language: English
- No. of seasons: 2
- No. of episodes: 18

Production
- Executive producers: Anthony King; Phil Lord; Christopher Miller
- Producers: Michael Cedar; Bridger Winegar; Aubrey Lee; Annie Court; Nicole Delaney
- Cinematography: Carl Herse; Ross Riege
- Editors: Joel Negron; Nick Olah; Ivan Victor; Marissa Mueller
- Running time: 31–48 minutes
- Production companies: Lord Miller Productions; TriStar Television; Sony Pictures Television Studios

Original release
- Network: Apple TV+
- Release: January 28, 2022 – September 6, 2023

The Afterparty is an American comedy murder mystery anthology television series created by Christopher Miller that premiered on Apple TV+ on January 28, 2022. In March 2022, the series was renewed for a second season, which premiered on July 12, 2023. In October 2023, it was announced that the series would not return for a third season.

== Premise ==
The first season takes place at a high school reunion after-party with each episode a different character's perspective of what happened that night. Critic Olivia Rutigliano noted that it is an example of "the millennial whodunnit", a new subgenre of murder mystery in which the investigation is a vehicle for characters to find second chances, personal fulfillment, and a departure from boring or oppressive daily life (through the feeling that their life has become a new genre).

The second season takes place the day after a wedding, following the same formula of each guest's perspective of the preceding after-party and the events leading up to it.

== Cast and characters ==
=== Main ===
- Tiffany Haddish as Detective Danner, a police detective investigating the murder of Xavier. After leaving the police to become an author and private detective, she returns to help solve the murder of Edgar.
- Sam Richardson as Aniq Adjaye, an escape room designer and the primary suspect who attempts to use his escape room skills to clear his name after being accused of Xavier's murder, and later to investigate Edgar's murder.
- Zoë Chao as Zoë Zhu, Aniq's high school crush, and following her divorce from Brett, later his girlfriend.

==== Season 1 ====
- Ike Barinholtz as Brett, a volunteer firefighter and Zoë's ex-husband
- Ben Schwartz as Yasper E. Lennov (guest season 2), Aniq's best friend and Xavier's former bandmate, who hopes to restart his music career
- Ilana Glazer as Chelsea, a veterinary clinic receptionist who blamed Xavier for her ostracization by the whole school
- Jamie Demetriou as Walt Butler (guest season 2), a partygoer whom no one seems to remember from high school
- Dave Franco as Xavier, a pop icon and movie star who is the murder victim. While publicly mononymous, his real full name is later revealed to have been "Eugene Xavier Duckworth, Jr.".

==== Season 2 ====
- John Cho as Ulysses Zhu, Grace and Zoë's absentee uncle and Feng's half-brother
- Paul Walter Hauser as Travis Gladrise, Grace's ex-boyfriend and a citizen detective
- Ken Jeong as Feng Zhu, Grace and Zoë's father, and Taiwanese shaved ice business owner
- Anna Konkle as Hannah Minnows, Edgar's adopted sister
- Poppy Liu as Grace Zhu, Zoë's newlywed sister who becomes the prime suspect in Edgar's murder
- Elizabeth Perkins as Isabel Minnows, Edgar and Hannah's mother
- Jack Whitehall as Sebastian Drapewood, Edgar's childhood friend, business partner, and the best man A young version of Sebastian is played by actor Shylo Molina in episodes 4 and 5.
- Zach Woods as Edgar Minnows, Grace's newlywed billionaire husband who is the murder victim
- Vivian Wu as Vivian Zhu, Grace and Zoë's mother

=== Recurring ===
Season 1

- John Early as Detective Culp (guest; season 2), Danner's partner
- Tiya Sircar as Jennifer #1, a pregnant mean girl
- Ayden Mayeri as Jennifer #2, another pregnant mean girl who goes missing upon Danner's arrival
- Genevieve Angelson as Indigo, an eccentric hipster activist.
- Kelvin Yu as Ned, Jennifer #1's husband.
- Everly Carganilla as Maggie, Zoë and Brett's daughter

In addition, Christopher May and Miracle Laurie co-star as Mr. Shapiro and Quiet Heather, respectively, a science teacher and former student who, as a running gag during the first season, are caught having intimate relations in each of the stories.

Season 2

- Will Greenberg as Judson, Sebastian's cousin who is Jaxson's brother
- John Gemberling as Jaxson, Sebastian's cousin who is Judson's brother
- Zack Calderon as Kyler, the wedding videographer
- Jade Wu as Ruth, an aunt of Grace and Zoë's

=== Special guest stars ===
- Channing Tatum as himself (season 1), who co-starred with Xavier in the Hall & Oates biopic
- Will Forte as himself (season 1), who co-starred with Xavier in a dramatic film adaptation of the board game Hungry Hungry Hippos and was due to reprise his role in the sequel before Xavier's death
- Gemma Chan as "Zoë" (season 2), an actress cast as Zoë in Danner's film X Marks the Murder Spot
- Keke Palmer as "Danner" (season 2), an actress cast as Danner in Danner's film X Marks the Murder Spot
- Elijah Wood as "Yasper" (season 2), an actor cast as Yasper in Danner's film X Marks the Murder Spot
- Jaleel White as himself/"Aniq" (season 2), cast as Aniq in Danner's film X Marks the Murder Spot and Danner's fiancée. White's casting serves to pay off a recurring gag of characters comparing Aniq to Urkel, whom White played on Family Matters

== Episodes ==
Season	Episodes	Originally released	
Season	Episodes	First released	Last released
1	8	January 28, 2022	March 4, 2022
2	10	July 12, 2023	September 6, 2023

=== Season 1 (2022) ===
No. overall	No. in season	Title	Directed by	Written by	Original release date
1	1	"Aniq"	Christopher Miller	Teleplay by : Christopher Miller & Kassia Miller; Story by : Christopher Miller	January 28, 2022
A prominent pop music icon Xavier is found dead at the afterparty of a high school reunion in Marin County. Against the advice of her superior, Detective Danner takes on the case. She first questions Aniq, an escape room designer who tells his story in the style of a romantic comedy. He was in pursuit of his high school crush Zoë at the reunion, but he faced competition from both Xavier and Brett, her ex-husband.
2	2	"Brett"	Christopher Miller	Anthony King	January 28, 2022
Danner questions Brett, who tells his story in the style of an action movie, in which he casts himself as a ne'er-do-well hero who is committed to his family. Meanwhile, in the bathroom, Aniq and Yasper look through the garbage to find a discarded note written by one of the partygoers.
3	3	"Yasper"	Christopher Miller	Jack Dolgen	January 28, 2022
Danner's partner Culp accidentally deletes all the security camera footage. Danner's next questions Yasper, Xavier's ex-bandmate, who tells his story in the style of a show-stopping musical. Meanwhile, after noticing the handwriting on the discarded note matches the handwriting on one of the drawings on his face, Aniq asks the partygoers to write something to see if their handwriting matches the note, but then notices the disappearance of one of the partygoers.
4	4	"Chelsea"	Christopher Miller	Bridger Winegar	February 4, 2022
Danner interrogates Chelsea, who tells her story in the style of a psychological thriller. In her story, she receives mysterious text messages from an unidentified number. It is also revealed that she also had an affair with Brett, and an unknown incident at a St. Patrick's Day party in high school made the whole entire school ostracize her. Danner wants to know more about the party, but Chelsea will not say more, explaining that it is in the past and that she wants to move forward with her life.
5	5	"High School"	Christopher Miller	Nicole Delaney	February 11, 2022
Danner wants to know about the St. Patrick's Day incident, and Walt volunteers to tell the story, in the style of a teen drama. Unbeknownst to everyone, the party had taken place at his house. Yasper breaks up his ska band with Xavier, embarrassed by his new eccentricities. Believing Aniq to be the cause, Xavier pushes him into the pool in frustration, ruining his chance with Zoë. He also lies about having slept with a drunken Chelsea after she turned him down, ruining her reputation. A drunken Aniq is later arrested for destroying Xavier's car in revenge, costing him his college scholarship. In the present, now looking even more guilty, Aniq reveals the discarded note, only to learn that the writing is simply one of Xavier's lyrics.
6	6	"Zoë"	Christopher Miller	Phil Lord & Rachel Smith	February 18, 2022
Zoë's interrogation is presented as an animation. In her story, Zoë's different inner selves attempt to dominate her personality. She learns that it was Jennifer 2 who had been sending Chelsea the anonymous texts. Meanwhile, Aniq and Yasper attempt to eavesdrop on the interrogation, but Yasper's phone is low on battery, so they try to find a charger. In their search, they get trapped in a secret room. Culp catches them spying and tells Danner that the police captain Germain has taken her off the case.
7	7	"Danner"	Christopher Miller	Anthony King & Christopher Miller	February 25, 2022
While waiting for Germain to arrive, Danner relates to Culp on how she came to be a detective in the first place, in the style of a police procedural. She talks about a particular high-profile case that Germain kept insisting her to stay away from, with her actions helping to prevent someone innocent from being blamed for the crime. Meanwhile, Zoë discovers that Aniq and Yasper have been listening in, and Aniq shares his AirPods with Zoë. They overhear Danner's concern that Germain taking over the case will guarantee Aniq's arrest. After an epiphany, Danner says she finally knows who killed Xavier, but they have to talk to one last eyewitness: Zoë and Brett's daughter, Maggie.
8	8	"Maggie"	Christopher Miller	Christopher Miller	March 4, 2022
After interviewing Maggie, who tells her story in the style of a children's show, Danner seemingly reveals to the group that Brett was the killer. Aniq steps in to defend him, despite his intervention leaving him as the only remaining suspect. However, Danner reveals this to have been a test of Aniq's character, and she announces that it was actually Yasper who killed Xavier. Using inconsistencies from the others' stories, Danner deduced that Yasper had hidden in Xavier's closet and used the loud music as a cover to push Xavier off the balcony. Yasper's motive was revenge for Xavier plagiarizing his ideas and refusing to help promote his new music. Danner also realized that Yasper had stolen Xavier's phone, which he used to disrupt the security cameras and steal Xavier's voice recordings. Yasper admits to his jealousy over Xavier's success and is promptly arrested. As morning comes, everyone goes their separate ways; Danner brags to Germain that she's solved the case, while Aniq and Zoë confess their feelings for each other, and kiss.

=== Season 2 (2023) ===
No. overall	No. in season	Title	Directed by	Written by	Original release date
9	1	"Aniq 2: The Sequel"	Eric Appel	Christopher Miller & Anthony King	July 12, 2023
Aniq and Zoë are celebrating one year together following last season's events. They attend the wedding of Zoë's sister, Grace, to an eccentric Silicon Valley businessman named Edgar. When Edgar and his pet lizard Roxana are found dead, Aniq calls Danner for help. Danner, who has left the police to write a book about Xavier's murder, agrees. Over the phone, Aniq tells her his version of the story, with the same romcom tone of the testimony he gave a year earlier. He also tells Danner he did not want to call the police out of concern for Grace, whom he witnessed put something in Edgar's drink the night before.
10	2	"Grace"	Anu Valia	Rachel Smith	July 12, 2023
Aniq and Danner interview Grace, who recalls her love story with Edgar in the style of a regency period piece (Note: mimicking the literary works of Jane Austen.) She meets Edgar at the antique booth where she works, selling him a typewriter as a gift for his adopted sister, Hannah. Edgar and Grace's whirlwind romance alarms Zoë, who expresses concern that Edgar is always preoccupied with his work. Grace confesses she had spiked Edgar's drink with Adderall so he would stay awake past his strict sleeping schedule, but he drunkenly caused a scene at the afterparty and lashed out at the guests. Travis, who had declared that Edgar will die that night, investigates the crime scene with Zoë and finds some interesting clues in his belongings.
11	3	"Travis"	Christopher Miller	Mike Rosolio	July 19, 2023
Grace's ex-boyfriend, Travis, a citizen detective, tells his version of events in the style of a noir crime drama. Believing that his wedding invite from Grace was a distress signal, and that the wedding needs to be stopped, Travis does some online sleuthing prior to the ceremony. Hannah assists. He discovers that Edgar had been using his own shell companies to inflate the value of his crypto coin. Travis is confronted by Sebastian while searching Edgar's office, and is attacked when he tries to follow Edgar after he abruptly leaves Grace on the dancefloor. Suspecting that Edgar had been poisoned, Zoë finds datura in Hannah's garden, which can be fatal if consumed.
12	4	"Hannah"	Anu Valia	Nicole Delaney	July 26, 2023
Hannah's testimony is set up as a twee pop-style coming-of-age story. (Note: The style is a homage to the films of Wes Anderson.) Hannah's friendship with Grace begins at her adoption anniversary party, and eventually blossoms into an affair. Grace ultimately choses Edgar over Hannah, leading to Hannah initially conspiring with Travis to sabotage the wedding. Hannah has a change of heart after hearing Edgar's vows, realizing how much he loves Grace. In the present, Aniq and Danner explore Edgar's office and discover that he had been looking for candidates to replace his business partner, Sebastian, who was fraudulently impersonating Edgar.
13	5	"Sebastian"	Anu Valia	The Shipley Brothers	August 2, 2023
Aniq and Danner interrogate Sebastian who gives his account in the style of a heist film. Sebastian discloses that in spite of his well-spoken English accent, he is actually an ambitious American from a poor background who from an early age had been pulling cons with the help of his cousins, Jaxson and Judson. Having been fired by Edgar, Sebastian sets up an elaborate heist to break into Edgar's safe during the wedding to retrieve a valuable baseball card. The plan fails when he trips the safe's alarm system, resulting in Edgar's sudden departure from the dancefloor. Travis follows, and is attacked by Judson. On hearing this account, Aniq is convinced that Sebastian must be the killer, but Danner wants to interview the rest of the guests before reaching any conclusions.
14	6	"Danner's Fire"	Tamra Davis	Anthony King & Christopher Miller	August 9, 2023
Worried that Aniq is not being impartial during their inquiries, Danner tells him, in the style of an erotic thriller, a cautionary tale about the case that caused her to leave the police force. As part of an investigation into a series of arson attacks, Danner wants to get into the mind of an arsonist, and she seeks help from a psychiatrist named Quentin Devereaux, who has been working with the police's primary suspect. Danner loses objectivity, and is drawn into an adventurous sexual relationship with Devereaux. Too late, as Danner is chained to the bed and left to die when Devereaux sets the house on fire, she realises that the psychiatrist is the true arsonist and that he has been using his professional knowledge to frame the suspect. Rescued in the nick of time by Culp, Danner quits the force. She now admits to Aniq that she has lost all faith in herself and that she has not even started writing her intended book on the Xavier case. Meanwhile, Travis microdoses himself with the datura, showing how easy it would have been for anyone to make an infusion of it in order to poison Edgar.
15	7	"Ulysses"	Peter Atencio	Brenda Hsueh	August 16, 2023
Zoë's parents, Feng and Vivian, make it clear that they do not want want to be questioned. Next to be interrogated is Ulysses, Feng's half-brother and the self-described "funcle" (fun uncle) of Grace and Zoë. His retelling of the weekend is told as an epic romance in which he reveals his torrid love affair with his own sister-in-law, Vivian, before Grace was born. Feng eventually discovers their secret, prompting Ulysses to travel the world for many years in a vain attempt to move on with his life. As the date of Grace's wedding to Edgar draws near, Edgar seeks out Ulysses in a remote region of steppe, and asks him to attend. Initially declining, Ulysses changes his mind when Edgar suggests that Ulysses could be Grace's biological father. Ulysses attends the ceremony with the intention of confirming Grace's parentage, much to Feng's fury. Zoë realizes that the wedding videographer, Kyler, should have plenty of footage from the previous night that could help pinpoint the killer.
16	8	"Feng"	Eric Appel	The Shipley Brothers	August 23, 2023
Aniq persuades Vivian to tell the truth about her past dalliance with Ulysses to Grace and Zoë. Aniq and Danner analyze Kyler's raw video footage of the weekend's festivities, with Feng joining them to provide his own commentary. Kyler's clips show that Feng was struggling financially, and Danner notes that since Grace did not sign a prenuptial agreement, Feng would have had a motive to obtain access to the dead Edgar's money through his daughter. One video shows Feng pestering Edgar to try his baobing dessert, with both Edgar and Roxana taking a bite. After watching a clip of Edgar's mother, Isabel, speaking to him in a menacing tone, Danner decides to interrogate her next. Isabel claims that she knows who killed Edgar, and that it was not Grace.
17	9	"Isabel"	Christopher Miller	Anna Lockhart & Katie Miller	August 30, 2023
Isabel begins her testimony with the events leading up to the wedding, told in the style of a melodramatic thriller. (Note: The style mimicks the films of Alfred Hitchcock.) As Isabel's mental health deteriorates following the death of her husband, an unsympathetic Edgar threatens her with conservatorship. But when Travis confronts her with Edgar's alleged crimes at the wedding rehearsal, Isabel begins to ponder whether Edgar has been gaslighting her in a bid to take control of her wealth. Her suspicions are confirmed when Grace and Zoë point out that the pills Edgar gave her for insomnia were actually the stimulant Adderall. Realizing that Edgar had tampered with her reception speech, a paranoid Isabel switches the slices of cake he brings to her table, fearing he had poisoned the slice intended for her. Just as Aniq points out some potential inconsistencies with the poisoned cake theory, the police sheriff arrives.
18	10	"Vivian and Zoë"	Tamra Davis	Christopher Miller & Anthony King	September 6, 2023
Aniq and Danner realize that Zoë was not accounted for in anyone's recollections of the afterparty. She sets out her version as a camp-style horror story. Initially it seems she is admitting to the murder, but is actually admitting to having killed Edgar's vicious dog, Colonel, by throwing him out of the window. (It is later revealed that Colonel landed on a trampoline, and survived). Back to square one, Aniq and Danner try to come up with a different theory before the sheriff formally arrests Grace. Suddenly, Danner has an epiphany; Edgar was not the intended target. After Vivian recalls her conversation with Ulysses and Feng (in a soap opera-styled flashback), Aniq and Danner piece together the truth: Ulysses was responsible for Edgar's death. Wanting Vivian for himself, Ulysses poisoned a cocktail that he made for Feng, and Edgar picked it up by accident after trying Feng's dessert. Ulysses finally confesses. One year later, Aniq and Zoë are engaged, and Danner is making a movie adaptation of Xavier's murder with an all-star cast.

== Production ==
=== Development ===
Miller conceived of The Afterparty in the early 2010s, where he wanted to make a murder mystery showing the different perspectives of the murder from its witnesses, inspired by his love of the murder-mystery genre and Akira Kurosawa's Rashomon. The high school reunion aspect was added after Miller attended a high school reunion himself, thinking it would be a unique setting for such a concept. Miller initially wrote it as a feature-length screenplay on his own while he was making Cloudy with a Chance of Meatballs and 21 Jump Street with Lord. In June 2013, the project was set-up at Sony Pictures as a film titled The Reunion, with Miller as sole writer and director, while producing the film along with Lord, Jonathan Kadin, and Hannah Minghella. However, the film never came to fruition due to commitments with The Lego Movie and 22 Jump Street. Lord and Miller were still optimistic in making The Reunion while promoting The Lego Movie, so when Miller considered making the project in later years, he made the decision to make it as a mini-series. Miller felt that expanding the concept into a series would allow him to properly develop the characters. Doing so also gave Miller the idea to present each version of the event as a separate genre in line with the respective POV's of each witness.

On June 24, 2020, it was announced that Apple TV+ had given the production an eight-episode straight-to-series order, now titled The Afterparty. The series is created by Miller who is also the showrunner and is expected to executive produce alongside Lord while Aubrey Lee is a producer. Production companies involved with the series were slated to consist of Sony Pictures Television and TriStar Television. On March 2, 2022, Apple TV+ renewed the series for a second season. On April 27, 2022, it was revealed that the second season would consist of ten episodes, two more than the first, and will revolve around a murder mystery at a wedding. It was also revealed Anthony King would be serving as co-showrunner along with Miller.

On January 24, 2023, The Afterparty executive producer Katie Miller announced via Instagram Live that a third season had entered development, beginning "Day 1… [of] The Afterparty S3" and its writing room; consequently, the second season finale of The Afterparty, aired September 6, 2023, ended with a teaser for a third season following a murder following the after-party for the premiere of X Marks the Murder Spot, Danner's film about the events of the first season, featuring Jaleel White as himself and Gemma Chan, Keke Palmer, and Elijah Wood as unnamed actors starring in Danner's film, with the idea of them reprising their roles in a potential third season.

On October 13, 2023, it was revealed that Apple TV+ had cancelled the series and would not order a third season.

=== Casting ===
In November 2020, the cast was announced, including Tiffany Haddish, Sam Richardson, Ben Schwartz, Ike Barinholtz, Ilana Glazer and Dave Franco. After the first season finale aired, Schwartz revealed that he was told he would be the murderer upon being cast, and that he kept it secret from the rest of the cast until the table read for the episode.

Upon the second season renewal announcement, it was reported that Haddish is set to reprise her role as Detective Danner, but a new cast of suspects for the second season. In April 2022, it was announced that Richardson and Chao are set to reprise their roles for the second season, with Elizabeth Perkins, Zach Woods, Paul Walter Hauser, Poppy Liu, Anna Konkle, Jack Whitehall and Vivian Wu joining the starring cast as, respectively, Isabel, Edgar, Travis, Grace, Hannah, Sebastian, and Vivian. In May 2022, it was reported that Ken Jeong and John Cho were cast as series regulars for the second season. On June 13, 2022, Will Greenberg and John Gemberling joined the cast in recurring roles for the second season.

=== Filming ===
On November 11, 2020, Miller, in an Instagram post, confirmed that filming for the series had officially begun. Miller directed all eight episodes in the series, making it the first time he has directed separately after his collaborations with Lord. In another Instagram post, on February 17, 2021, Miller revealed that filming was finished for the first season.

The sixth episode features animation done by ShadowMachine, the animation studio behind BoJack Horseman and the 2023 revival of Lord and Miller's Clone High. The animation was designed by Lindsey Olivares, who previously worked with Lord and Miller on the aesthetic design for The Mitchells vs. the Machines. The animation was done at the same time as the live-action.

Filming for the second season began on May 11, 2022, with Miller again returning as director. In an Instagram post, on September 1, 2022, Jack Whitehall confirmed that filming for the second season had wrapped.

=== Music ===
The score for season 1 of The Afterparty was composed by Daniel Pemberton, who previously worked with Lord and Miller on Spider-Man: Into the Spider-Verse. In an interview with Variety, Pemberton explained the challenge of having to compose in different styles for each of the characters. He states, " It's like I'm scoring 10 films, plus a series, plus loads of incidental stuff, plus producing some songs. There was a lot on my shoulders with this project." Pemberton started work on the project by composing the main theme and the frame story outside of the flashbacks, then the music for the flashbacks. His influences on each include those of Richard Curtis films like Notting Hill for Aniq's rom-com flashback, the music of Howard Shore and Bernard Herrmann for Chelsea's psychological thriller, and the Tyler Bates' drum and guitar-heavy score of John Wick for Brett's action-movie story. The third episode is also a musical, containing three songs written by Jack Dolgen from Crazy Ex-Girlfriend and musical comedian Jon Lajoie, who worked with Lord and Miller on writing the songs for The Lego Movie 2: The Second Part. The soundtrack album for the season with the score and songs was released alongside the first three episodes on January 28, 2022. The score for season 2 was co-composed by Daniel Pemberton, who returned composing from season 1 and David Schweitzer. The season contains cover versions of Doris Day's Sentimental Journey and Hanson's MMMBop. The third episode that was set as a noir detective film had some music written by Ed Mitchell and Steve Morrell. The soundtrack album for the season with the score and songs was released of September 1, 2023, before the season finale.

Another extended play album was released on February 1, 2022, featuring four songs performed by Franco in character as "Xavier" called R.I.P. Xavier.

==== Season 1 soundtrack ====
The Afterparty: Season 1 (Apple TV+ Original Series Soundtrack)

Soundtrack album by Daniel Pemberton
- Released: January 28, 2022
- Length: 60:14
- Label: Sony Pictures Television Inc.
- Producer: Daniel Pemberton

Daniel Pemberton chronology
Welcome to Earth (2021)	The Afterparty: Season 1 (Apple TV+ Original Series Soundtrack) (2022)	Slow Horses (2022)

All tracks are written by Daniel Pemberton, except where indicated.

No.	Title	Writer(s)	Performer(s)	Length
1.	"The Afterparty (Titles)"			0:51
2.	"Danner Arrives"			2:06
3.	"Mind Movies"			2:03
4.	"Suspicious Times"			5:16
5.	"Aniq's Rom-Com World"			2:03
6.	"Remembering Xavier"			0:34
7.	"Aniq's Prelude to a Kiss"			1:54
8.	"Aniq and the Balloons"			1:08
9.	"The Afterparty (Chamber)"			2:48
10.	"Brett Scoping the Party"			1:35
11.	"Brett's Fists of Fury"			1:36
12.	"Two Shots"	Jack Dolgen, Jon Lajoie	Ben Schwartz, Sam Richardson, Jamie Demetriou	2:38
13.	"Yeah Sure Whatever"	Dolgen, Lajoie	Schwartz	2:23
14.	"Three Dots from Stardom"	Dolgen, Lajoie	Schwartz	3:23
15.	"Chelsea's Feeling Threatened"			1:21
16.	"Chelsea's Hip Flask"			2:29
17.	"Chelsea's Stalker"			2:28
18.	"Someone's Watching You, Chelsea"			3:48
19.	"Indigo's Visions"			2:18
20.	"The Usual Suspects"			0:38
21.	"High School Band Breakup"			1:18
22.	"Put Yourself Out There, Walt"			1:18
23.	"Stoner Zoë"			1:03
24.	"Zoë's Self Hug"			1:11
25.	"Danner Training Course"			1:11
26.	"Danner's On Patrol"			1:40
27.	"Maggie's Kid Eye World"			2:09
28.	"Whodunnit?"			2:07
29.	"I Did Not Kill Anyone"			3:40
30.	"One Clue Revealed"			2:13
31.	"J'Accuse"			5:44
32.	"Howdunnit"			3:05
33.	"Busted"			2:17
34.	"The Afterparty (End Credits)"			2:04
Total length:				60:14

==== Season 2 soundtrack ====
The Afterparty: Season 2 (Apple TV+ Original Series Soundtrack)

Soundtrack album by Daniel Pemberton and David Schweitzer
- Released: September 1, 2023
- Length: 81:00
- Label: Sony Pictures Television Inc.
- Producers: Daniel Pemberton and David Schweitzer

All tracks are written by Daniel Pemberton and David Schweitzer, except where indicated.

No.	Title	Writer(s)	Performer(s)	Length
1.	"The Afterparty (Season 2 Titles)"			1:03
2.	"Rom-Com Return"			1:02
3.	"The Hand Kisser"			1:10
4.	"Party Dancing"			2:44
5.	"Meeting Edgar"			2:50
6.	"Bachelorette Party"			2:31
7.	"Part of His World"			3:25
8.	"Satin Doll"	Ed Mitchell, Steve Morrell		3:15
9.	"Travis Flashback"			2:56
10.	"Travis and Hannah Team Up"			1:54
11.	"Stomping' at the Savoy"	Mitchell, Morrell		1:59
12.	"Morse Code"			2:14
13.	"Sentimental Journey"	Les Brown, Ben Homer, Bud Green	John Cho, Zoë Chao, Poppy Liu	1:30
14.	"Hannah's World"			1:11
15.	"Hannah and Travis Conspire"			1:10
16.	"Edger's Vows"			1:17
17.	"Two for One"	Mitchell, Morrell		2:49
18.	"Planning the Heist"			1:10
19.	"Connect Four"			1:43
20.	"Cousin Gang Robbery"			1:56
21.	"Sing Sing Sing"	Mitchell		2:49
22.	"Danner's Fire"			6:34
23.	"Candles and Consent"			2:07
24.	"Lighting up the Stage"			3:05
25.	"Erase Your Mistakes"			2:52
26.	"Kuwait"			2:03
27.	"Dance With the Pain"			2:08
28.	"White Horse"			1:16
29.	"What Really Happened"			1:01
30.	"Unraveling"			2:37
31.	"Gaslit!"			2:53
32.	"MMMBop"	Isaac Hanson, Taylor Hanson, Zac Hanson	Raewyn Davidson, Bri Holland, James Larson, Mackenzie Nibbe, Kennedy Nibbe	1:08
33.	"The Threat of Dr. Shulkind"			4:19
34.	"Chalice of Truth"			2:24
35.	"Wrapping Up"			2:21
36.	"Proposals"			1:33
Total length:				81:00

==== R.I.P. Xavier EP ====
R.I.P. Xavier

EP by Xavier (Dave Franco)
- Released: February 1, 2022
- Length: 10:12
- Labels: Sony Pictures Television, Inc.
- Producer: Stelios Phili

No.	Title	Writer(s)	Length
1.	"Imma Live Forever"	Christopher Robert Miller, Leven Kali, Simon Seay, Stelios Phili	2:26
2.	"X Marks the G Spot"	Phili	2:30
3.	"Do Wet"	Phili	2:21
4.	"Just Like U"	Miller, Phili	2:54
Total length:			10:12

== Release ==
The Afterparty premiered on January 28, 2022. The second season premiered on July 12, 2023, which was pushed back from its original date of April 28, 2023, with the first two episodes available immediately and one new episode debuting on a weekly basis until the season finale.

== Reception ==
=== Critical response ===
The review aggregator website Rotten Tomatoes reported a 90% approval rating with an average rating of 7.6/10 for season one, based on 69 critic reviews. The website's critics consensus reads, "The Afterparty sometimes strains to keep the jamboree of yuks going, but its ambitious melding of genres and extensive guest list of actors make for a worthwhile nightcap." Metacritic, which uses a weighted average, assigned a score of 72 out of 100 based on 26 critics, indicating "generally favorable reviews".

Rotten Tomatoes holds a 95% approval rating with an average rating of 7.4/10 for season two, based on 38 critic reviews. The website's critics consensus states, "The Afterparty welcomes in a mostly new cast and keeps things festive with its enduringly clever Rashomon-style format, stirring up an entertainment that viewers won't want to end." Metacritic assigned a score of 74 out of 100 based on 14 critics, indicating "generally favorable reviews".

=== Accolades ===
Year	Award	Category	Nominee(s)	Result	Ref.
2022	Hollywood Critics Association TV Awards	Best Streaming Series, Comedy	The Afterparty	Nominated	
2022	Hollywood Critics Association TV Awards	Best Actor in a Streaming Series, Comedy	Sam Richardson	Nominated	
2022	Hollywood Critics Association TV Awards	Best Actress in a Streaming Series, Comedy	Tiffany Haddish	Nominated	
2022	Hollywood Critics Association TV Awards	Best Supporting Actor in a Streaming Series, Comedy	Ben Schwartz	Nominated	
2022	Hollywood Critics Association TV Awards	Best Directing in a Streaming Series, Comedy	Christopher Miller (for "Yasper")	Nominated	
2022	Hollywood Critics Association TV Awards	Best Writing in a Streaming Series, Comedy	Christopher Miller (for "Maggie")	Nominated	
2022	Imagen Awards	Best Young Actor	Everly Carganilla	Nominated	
2023	Hollywood Music in Media Awards	Music Supervision – Television	Kier Lehman (for season 2)	Nominated	
