= Yasper =

- The Afterparty episode
- Episode no.: Season 1 Episode 3
- Directed by: Christopher Miller
- Written by: Jack Dolgen
- Cinematography by: Carl Herse
- Editing by: Joel Negron; Nick Olah
- Original air date: January 28, 2022
- Running time: 34 minutes

Episode chronology
← Previous "Brett"	Next → "Chelsea"

"Yasper" is the third episode of the American murder mystery comedy television series The Afterparty. The episode was written by Jack Dolgen and directed by series creator Christopher Miller. It was released on Apple TV+ on January 28, 2022, alongside "Aniq" and "Brett".

The series follows the events that follow a high school reunion after-party ending in a murder, where everyone is a suspect, as Detective Danner interviews the various suspects present, having her tell them their "mind-movies" about the night in question and the events leading up to it. The episode follows Danner as she interviews amateur one-man ska band and AV repairman Yasper E. Lennov, who recounts the night's events in the style of a show-stopping musical, as his best friend Aniq continues investigating outside.

The series premiere received positive reviews from critics, who praised Ben Schwartz's performance of "Two Shots" as well as Miller's directing, writing, editing, and cinematography as strong points, for which he was nominated for Best Directing in a Streaming Series, Comedy for the episode at the 2022 Hollywood Critics Association TV Awards.

== Plot ==
After Danner's partner Culp (John Early) apparently accidentally deletes all the security camera footage of the night of the murder, Danner (Tiffany Haddish) next interviews Xavier's ex-bandmate Yasper (Ben Schwartz), who tells his story in the style of a toe-tapping musical, having asked Xavier to "bless a track" of his at the reunion before waiting for him in his recording studio during the after-party. Meanwhile, after noticing the handwriting on the discarded note matches the handwriting on one of the drawings on his face, Aniq (Sam Richardson) asks the partygoers to write something to see if their handwriting matches the note, but then notices that one of the partygoers, Jennifer #2 (Ayden Mayeri), has been missing since the murder.

== Production ==
=== Development ===
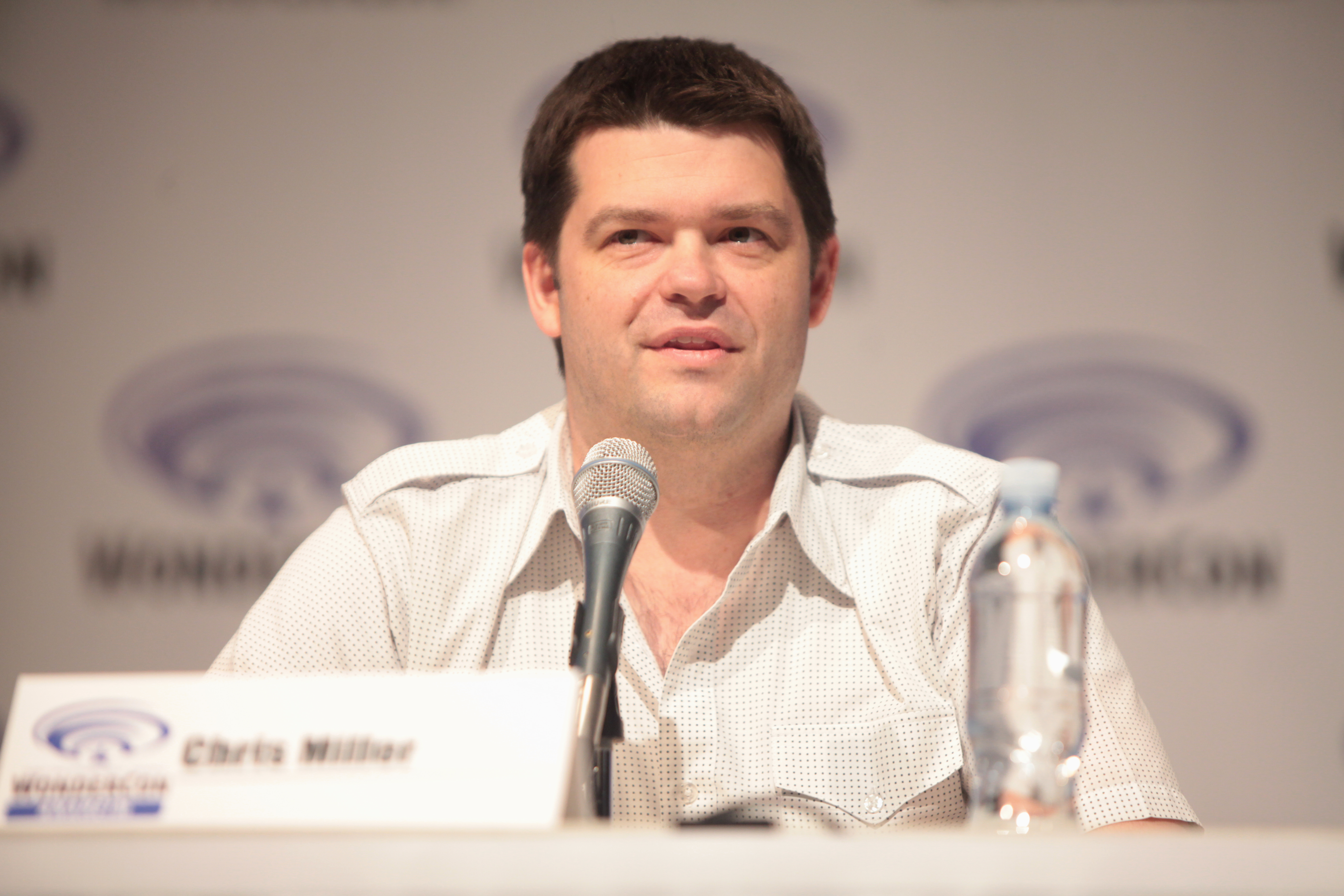
Series creator Christopher Miller directed the episode, written by Jack Dolgen.

Christopher Miller conceived of The Afterparty in the early 2010s, where he wanted to make a murder mystery showing the different perspectives of the murder from its witnesses, inspired by his love of the murder-mystery genre and Akira Kurosawa's Rashomon. The high school reunion aspect was added after Miller attended a high school reunion himself, thinking it would be a unique setting for such a concept. Miller initially wrote it as a feature-length screenplay on his own while he was making Cloudy with a Chance of Meatballs and 21 Jump Street with Lord. In June 2013, the project was set-up at Sony Pictures as a film titled The Reunion, with Miller as sole writer and director, while producing the film along with Lord, Jonathan Kadin, and Hannah Minghella. However, the film never came to fruition due to commitments with The Lego Movie and 22 Jump Street. Lord and Miller were still optimistic in making The Reunion while promoting The Lego Movie, so when Miller considered making the project in later hears, he made the decision to make it as a mini-series. Miller felt that expanding the concept into a series would allow him to properly develop the characters. Doing so also gave Miller the idea to present each version of the event as a separate genre in line with the respective POV's of each witness, called "mind-movies" in the series itself.

On June 24, 2020, it was announced that Apple TV+ had given the production an eight-episode straight-to-series order, now titled The Afterparty. The series is created by Miller who is also the showrunner and is expected to executive produce alongside Lord while Aubrey Lee is a producer. Production companies involved with the series were slated to consist of Sony Pictures Television and TriStar Television.

==== Music ====
Speaking on his performance of the rap duet "Two Shots" with Ben Schwartz in the episode, Sam Richardson called it "certainly a fun challenge [since] my skill set, is not rapping and choreography”, describing it as "like a music video", with Schwartz complimenting the choreography of his solo songs "Yeah, Sure, Whatever" and "Three Dots from Stardom", calling it "the monster one", having been approached for the series off of his musical talent.

=== Casting ===
In November 2020, the cast was announced, including Tiffany Haddish, Sam Richardson, Ben Schwartz, Ike Barinholtz, Ilana Glazer and Dave Franco.

=== Filming ===
On November 11, 2020, Miller, in an Instagram post, confirmed that filming for the series had officially begun. Miller directed "Yasper" and all eight episodes in the series, making it the first time he had directed separately since his collaborations with Phil Lord. Episode cinematographer Carl Herse described "La La Land, modern music videos, hip-hop videos, [and] 8 Mile" as having been influences for the episode's look.

== Reception ==
=== Critical response ===
"Yasper" received extremely positive reviews from critics. IndieWire ranked the episode second on their list of "The 20 Best TV Episodes of 2022", describing it as the most "satisfying" episode of the series, and describing Ben Schwartz as being "in his element, all manic-comedy energy and hilarious idiosyncrasy, finding jokes in everything from one-liners to Yasper’s body language on the sofa, and the production add[ing] visual gags to a genre known for spectacle", a sentiment echoed by Decider, who ranked the episode seventh on their list of "The Best TV Episodes of 2022", calling it "a shot of joyful adrenaline [full of] certified bangers [with] Schwartz's infectious comedic energy [being] on full display in this jubilant, hilarious offering".

Proma Khosla of Mashable complimenting the episode's songs and Ben Schwartz's and Sam Richardson's performances, calling the pair "a comedy dream team which might be The Afterparty's greatest gift", with "Two Shots" being "sinfully catchy", praising it in comparison Hamilton's "My Shot," and Eminem's "Lose Yourself," with both songs "emphasiz[ing] the importance of one shot (one opportunity) for a person to change their life forever", stating that while "packag[ing] the idea in a completely new way, starting with the one-shot philosophy and leading us elegantly toward two [and] references to Back to the Future, hypothetical scenarios ("If you fail the bar exam, become a paralegal"), and connections to the show itself and Aniq and Zoe's love story, "Two Shots" is a powerful bop and an emotional journey", calling the song "2022's first TV banger", and further retrospectively lauding the episode's foreshadowing on the airing of the first season finale "Maggie" in March 2022. Jordan Williams of Screen Rant similarly lauded the song's "playfully mocking twist" on Hamilton in being "a bit more optimistic in saying it's never too late to achieve your dreams".

Joan Kubicek of Vulture praised the episode's direction, calling Yasper's performances "his very own High School Musical, but thankfully without that tortured Troy Bolton bangs swoop", while Richard Schertzer of Sportskeeda praised Tiffany Haddish's "hilarious lead performance" in the episode and interactions with Schwartz. Greg Wheeler of The Review Geek complimented the characterisation of Yasper in the episode, while calling it "arguably the weakest of the bunch" of the three episodes that made up the series premiere (alongside "Aniq" and "Brett").

Mary Littlejohn of TV Fanatic called the episode "the funniest half-hour of television to grace my screen in a long time", stating that "Ben Schwartz is a gift to comedy, okay? Physicality, line delivery -- he’s got the goods. Also, the man can SING. He is in no way re-inventing himself as Yasper, the dorky audio-visual expert who desperately wants to be a big-time pop star [with] Schwartz knowing exactly how to play up the pathetic side of Yasper while also making him goofy and endearing without a trace of irony. He genuinely believes that this dream can happen for him", making him "the hero of a shallow narrative in which he is deeply invested. Every song he sings is about how close he is to making his fantasy come true [and] so single-minded that he doesn’t pay attention to anything that doesn’t affect him", further praising its "silliness stem[ming] from the absurdity of making up an entire song about seemingly innocuous events [and] Detective Danner’s irritability with Yasper. Her dry sense of humor [going] totally over his head, and their mismatched personalities ma[king] their scenes awkward and funny".

MJ Malpiedi of Comic Book Resources comparatively praised Schwartz's performance as Yasper to his Parks and Recreation character Jean-Ralphio Saperstein, deeming the characters to have similar "energy", describing the song "Two Shots" as "a motivational hip-hop track [spoofing] Eminem's "Lose Yourself"", "Yeah, Sure, Whatever" as "perfectly captur[ing] the themes of misconception and second chances", and "Three Dots from Stardom" as "solemn". Emma Fraser of IGN similarly praised the episode as "quite the earworm — I have already rewatched this episode multiple times. Ben Schwartz as Yasper is as if Jean-Ralphio Saperstein from Parks and Recreation had more self-awareness but the same desire to bust out a tune. It is an infectious, scene-stealing performance and his chemistry with Richardson is part of the overall charm".

Erin Allen of TellTaleTV lauded the episode's satire of the "unnecessary musical number" like that of The Office's "Threat Level Midnight", with Ben Schwartz "making it a pleasure to follow Yasper in the spotlight on his musical adventure, especially after his appearance in "Aniq" playing the funny and helpful sidekick role. Additionally, Schwartz's scenes with Haddish during the retelling are fun, too—the two play off each other really well".

Alex Welch of Inverse called the episode "a homage to [a] La La Land-esque musical [proving] that Schwartz and showrunner Christopher Miller need to team up for a feature-length musical", while rating the premiere "10/10", Christian Hubbard of Full Circle Cinema lauded the episode as "quite possibly, the best offering of the premiere episodes", stating that Schwartz "wows" as Yasper, and is "once again able to pull off what he's becoming famous for: stealing the show. Unlocking some hidden musical gifts as well as a becoming potential star on the rise, Schwartz is easily the MVP of the stacked cast". Shirley Tayshete of Meaww called the episode "very Bollywood-esque, filled with songs and a cast that join in for a perfectly choreographed number [with] Schwartz [being] extremely likable as Yasper and bring[ing] a child-like innocence to the character as he sings of his dreams", concluding to call out "Yasper and Aniq's bromance [as] a highlight with Richardson and Schwartz making an excellent comedic duo that goes together like peanut butter and jelly".

=== Accolades ===
Year	Award	Category	Nominee(s)	Result	Ref.
2022	Hollywood Critics Association TV Awards	Best Directing in a Streaming Series, Comedy	Christopher Miller	Nominated	

At the 2022 Hollywood Critics Association TV Awards, Christopher Miller was nominated for Best Directing in a Streaming Series, Comedy for "Yasper".

=== In popular culture ===
The artificial intelligence machine learning writing tool "Jasper AI" is named in reference to The Afterparty's Yasper (Jasper), with the programme described as able to write "entire blog posts in one shot", in reference to the song "Two Shots" and its lyrics.
