= Phil Lord and Christopher Miller =

American filmmaking and acting duo

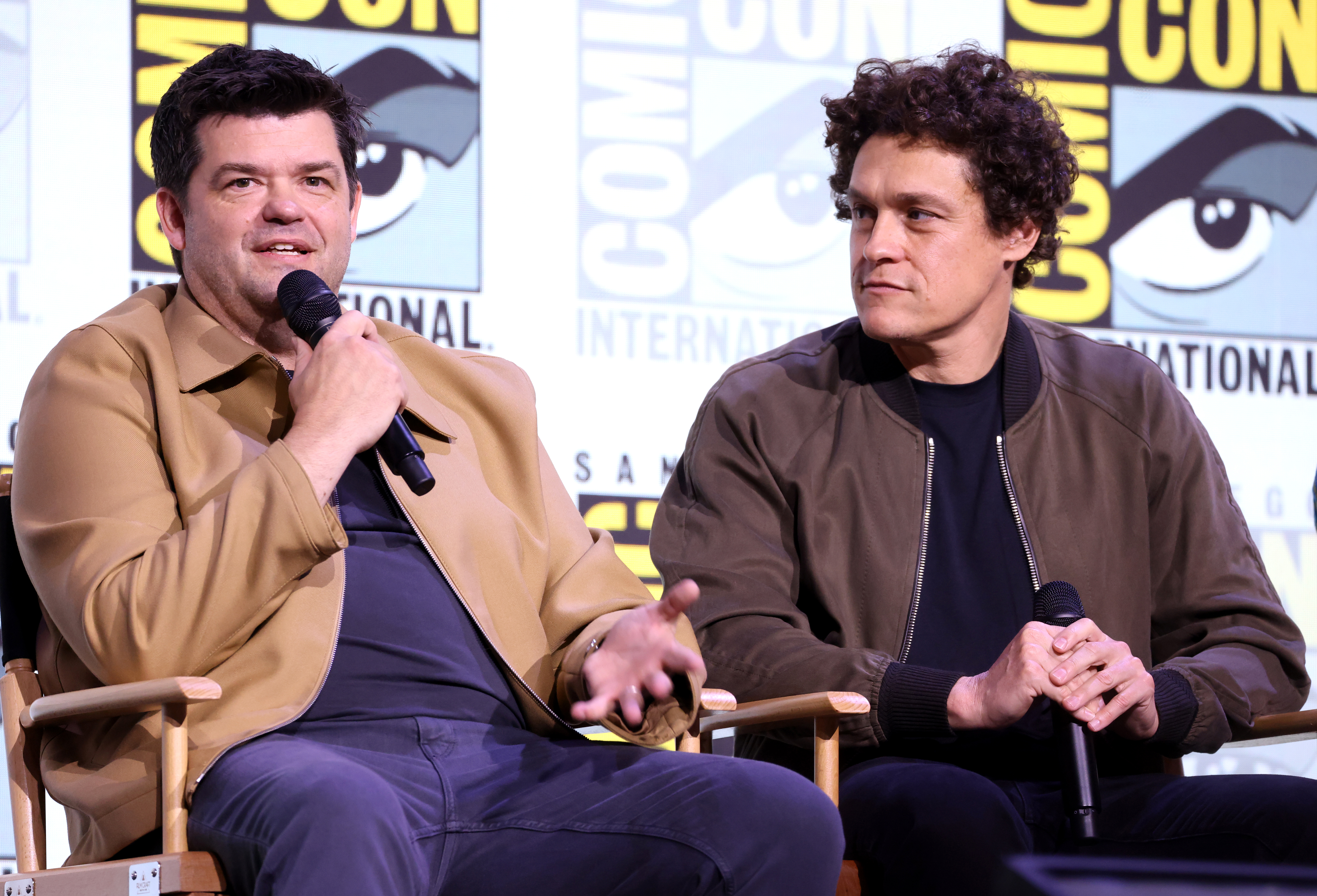
- Miller (left) and Lord (right) at the 2025 San Diego Comic-Con
- Born: Philip Anderson Lord; July 12, 1975 (age 51); Miami, Florida, U.S.; Christopher Robert Miller; September 23, 1975 (age 51); Everett, Washington, U.S.
- Education: Dartmouth College
- Occupations: Writers; voice actors; actors; directors; producers
- Years active: 1998–present
- Notable work: Cloudy with a Chance of Meatballs; The Lego Movie; Spider-Verse film franchise Clone High; 21 Jump Street; 22 Jump Street; Project Hail Mary
- Spouse: Robyn Murgio (Miller)
- Children: 2 (Miller)
- Awards: Academy Award for Best Animated Feature; Spider-Man: Into the Spider-Verse (2018)

Philip Anderson Lord (born July 12, 1975) and Christopher Robert Miller (born September 23, 1975) are an American filmmaking and acting duo. Their films are known for subversion of genre and detailed visual sensation, spanning various styles of live-action and animation. They are known for co-creating the Cloudy with a Chance of Meatballs, Lego Movie and Spider-Verse film franchises.

Lord and Miller were the co-creators, co-stars, and co-heads of the adult animated sitcom Clone High (2002–2003, 2023–2024), and were the writers and directors of the animated films Cloudy with a Chance of Meatballs (2009) and The Lego Movie (2014). They were the directors of the live-action comedy films 21 Jump Street (2012) and 22 Jump Street (2014), and the science fiction adventure film Project Hail Mary (2026). Lord and Miller have also worked on the television series The Last Man on Earth (2015–2018) for Fox, Unikitty! (2017–2020) for Cartoon Network, and The Afterparty (2022–2023) for Apple TV+.

For co-producing Spider-Man: Into the Spider-Verse (2018), they won the Academy Award for Best Animated Feature, and garnered nominations in the same category for co-producing the sequel Spider-Man: Across the Spider-Verse (2023) and for producing the film The Mitchells vs. The Machines (2021).

== Early lives ==
Lord is from Miami; his mother is a Cuban-born psychologist and his father retired from the aviation business and before that directed a dance company, Fusion, for 10 years. Miller is from Lake Stevens, Washington, where his father runs a lumber mill.

Lord and Miller both grew up making short films with an affinity for animation. They both attended Dartmouth College, where they first met, and had separate comics in the school newspaper, The Dartmouth. Lord was a member of Amarna, a co-ed undergraduate society while Miller was a brother at Alpha Chi Alpha. Both were members of the college's satire magazine Dartmouth Jack-O-Lantern, with Miller serving as the editor-in-chief and Lord as the Arts Editor. During his time in college, Miller met his girlfriend, now wife.

During their time at Dartmouth, the school paper published a profile on Miller, which caught the attention of Michael Eisner, then chairman of Disney. According to Lord, Eisner brought the profile to the attention of his fellow Disney executives who offered to set up a meeting with Miller. Miller agreed to the meeting under the condition that he also bring Lord. After three months, the two moved to Los Angeles and after one meeting were offered a two-year development deal at Disney Television Animation.

== Careers ==
=== 2000s ===
Though nothing they pitched made it to air, Lord and Miller produced the pilot to Clone High, which was subsequently dropped by Fox. After they wrote and produced on a series of sitcoms, MTV informed the duo that they were interested in purchasing a 13-episode season of Clone High. Although the show was met with acclaim, MTV canceled the series after hunger strike protests occurred in India over the show's portrayal of Gandhi as a motor-mouthed partier.

In 2003, the two were tapped to write a screenplay for Cloudy with a Chance of Meatballs, their first feature film. After a year working on the script, they were fired for story issues and replaced with new writers, who after a year were fired themselves. Lord and Miller were re-hired in 2006. The two completely redid the script, this time with the creative input of their crew. The new draft had the protagonist as a failed inventor who wanted to prove himself to his town. The two were almost fired again after Amy Pascal, the head of Sony Pictures at the time, criticized the film for a lack of story. Although the film succeeded on the comedic front in the animatic stage, Pascal cited the lack of an anchoring relationship in the film as a failure in the story telling. Unable to create new characters and environments to suit the new story demands, the two elevated the character of the tackle shop extra to be the protagonist's father, thereby creating the relationship Pascal had requested. Cloudy with a Chance of Meatballs was released in 2009 to positive reviews.

=== 2010s ===
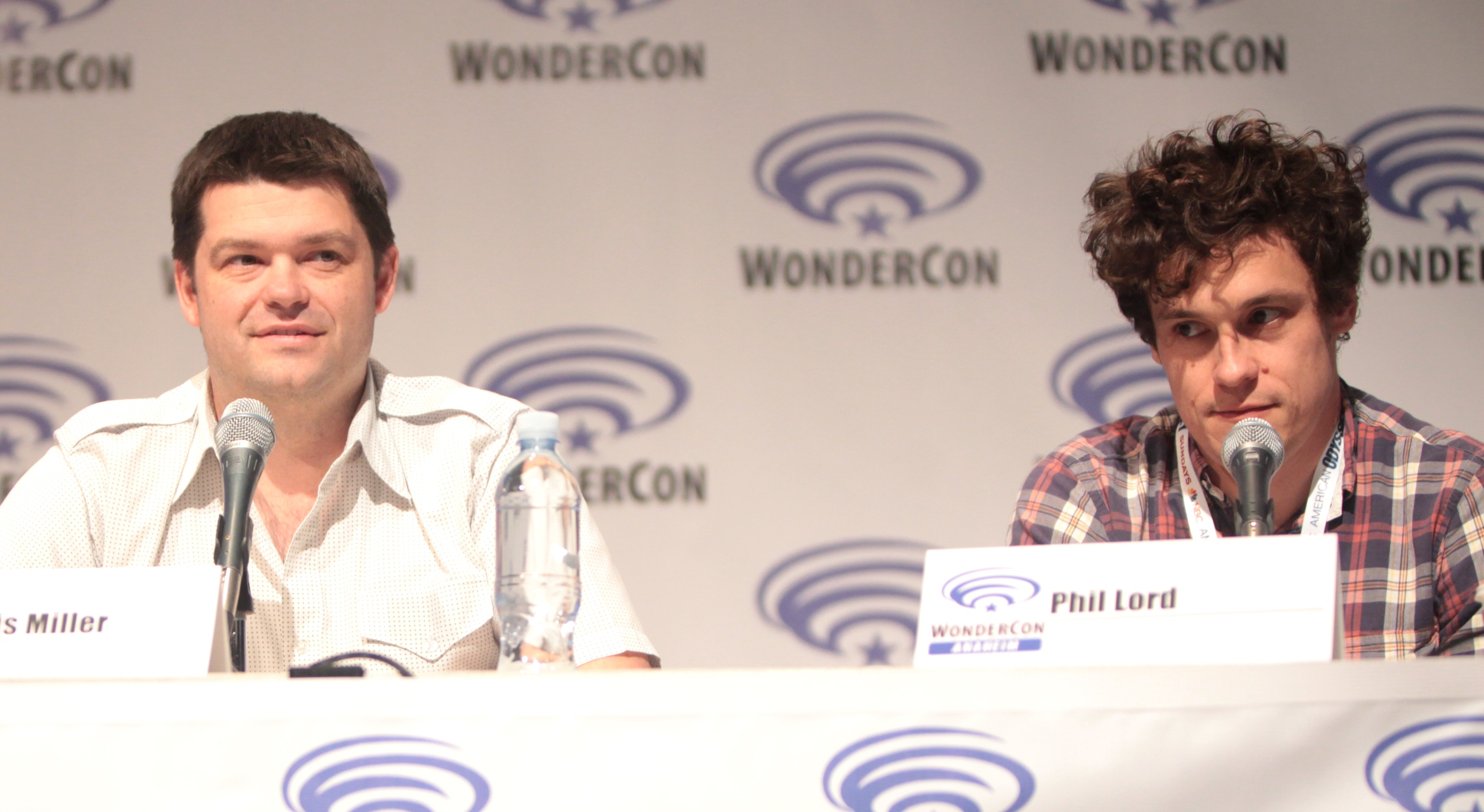
Miller and Lord at the 2015 WonderCon

After Cloudy with a Chance of Meatballs was released, the two sought to try to make something different and pitched themselves as possible directors for the 21 Jump Street script that Michael Bacall and Jonah Hill had written. The studio agreed and the two directed their first live-action R-rated film, released to critical acclaim, which led to the production of the sequel 22 Jump Street.

In an interview with Robert K. Elder for his book The Best Film You've Never Seen, Lord stated that "in an animated feature, you remake the movie three or four times, and it's really easy to get bummed out that the way you did it before didn't get greenlit, didn't get paid, and you're making a totally different version of that movie."

During the production of 21 Jump Street, they pitched a take on a possible Lego film to Dan Lin. Lin and Warner Bros. loved the take, so Lord and Miller wrote and eventually directed their third feature film together, The Lego Movie. The duo were picked by Warner Bros. to write the story treatment for the then-upcoming superhero film The Flash, but dropped out of the project in favor of directing the then-untitled Solo: A Star Wars Story. The duo were picked by Sony Pictures Animation in 2015 to create an animated Spider-Man film, with the option to direct. The film was eventually made as Spider-Man: Into the Spider-Verse (2018), which the duo produced and which Lord co-wrote.

The duo have developed a live-action/animated series, Son of Zorn, for Fox, with Jason Sudeikis voicing the lead role of animated character Zorn, and Johnny Pemberton and Cheryl Hines playing the live-action roles. They are producing a cable-TV drama based on the popular NPR/This American Life spinoff podcast Serial.

In January 2017, Lord and Miller began directing the then-untitled film Solo: A Star Wars Story, a standalone Star Wars movie based on the Han Solo character. On June 20, 2017, it was reported that they had been fired from the project by Lucasfilm, after over four-and-a-half months of filming, about three-quarters through principal photography. Lucasfilm announced that "creative differences" were the reason, with Entertainment Weekly reporting that Lord and Miller were going off-script and trying to make the film into more of a comedy. They were unwilling to compromise with Lucasfilm and writer Lawrence Kasdan on the direction of the film, preferring their vision. Two days later, Ron Howard was announced as the replacement, to complete the film and reshoots. Lord and Miller received executive-producer credits on Solo: A Star Wars Story.

In November 2017, Lord and Miller commented on their departure from Solo: A Star Wars Story. Lord stated "The experience of shooting the movie was wonderful. We had the most incredible cast and crew and collaborators. [...] We're really proud of the work we did on the movie and we wish everybody the best." Miller added "As Phil said, we had such a great relationship with cast and crew, we were really rooting for them. After we took a much-needed vacation, we got back into it and now we're writing and producing a sequel to The Lego Movie and producing a Miles Morales animated Spider-Man."

In August 2019, Lord and Miller signed a first-look deal with Universal Pictures.

=== 2020s ===
In 2021, Lord and Miller produced two animated films that were distributed through Netflix. The first was The Mitchells vs. the Machines for Sony Pictures Animation. They also produced an R-rated animated Netflix original film called America: The Motion Picture alongside Will Allegra, Matt Thompson, David Callaham, Channing Tatum, Reid Carolin and Peter Kiernan from a screenplay by Callaham and directed by Thompson.

In June 2020, it was reported that Lord and Miller would be developing an eight-episode television series titled The Afterparty for Apple TV+. The series is a murder mystery comedy set at a high school reunion where each episode features a retelling of the same night told through a different character's point of view. Miller created and directed the series, while serving as an executive producer alongside Lord. The series premiered on January 28, 2022, to critical acclaim.

On November 1, 2019, it was announced that Lord and Miller would be returning as producers and writers for Spider-Man: Across the Spider-Verse, which was released on June 2, 2023. In December 2021, Lord and Miller revealed that Across the Spider-Verse was being split into two parts after they had written down the story they wanted to tell for the sequel and realized that it was too much for a single film. Work on both parts was taking place simultaneously, or at least believed to be until June 2023 when animators claimed they were overworked to complete Part One, with Part Two since renamed to Spider-Man: Beyond the Spider-Verse. The film was removed from the release schedule on July 28, 2023, reportedly due to the then-ongoing 2023 SAG-AFTRA strike. Its original release date of March 29, 2024, was taken by Ghostbusters: Frozen Empire. Recording of voice lines were set to resume on November 9, 2023, following the resolution of the SAG-AFTRA strike, and production was confirmed by Miller to have resumed the following month. At CinemaCon, Sony announced a release date of June 4, 2027. By July, the film was further delayed to June 25, 2027, and pushed forward to June 18, 2027, in September.

On July 2, 2020, it was announced that MTV Entertainment Studios was developing a revival of Clone High, and that original series creators, Lord, Miller, and Bill Lawrence would be involved with the project. In February 2021, HBO Max ordered two seasons of the revival, the first of which premiered on May 23, 2023.

As part of their first-look deal with Universal Pictures, Lord and Miller have produced two R-rated comedy films for the studio: Cocaine Bear, a comedy horror film which was inspired by the true story involving the eponymous bear, and Strays, a comedy about talking dogs.

On May 15, 2020, Variety reported that Lord and Miller were attached to direct a film adaptation of Andy Weir's novel Project Hail Mary for Metro-Goldwyn-Mayer, with Ryan Gosling attached to star in the leading role and Amy Pascal producing. Filming began in June 2024 in the UK. The film, which was Lord and Miller's first directorial credit in over a decade, was released on March 20, 2026. Released the same year, Lord and Miller produced the Spider-Noir live-action television series for MGM+, and was credited as executive producers for The Sheep Detectives.

=== Future projects ===
In September 2017, it was announced that Lord & Miller will direct an adaptation of Andy Weir's Artemis for Regency Enterprises through 20th Century Fox, with Geneva Robertson-Dworet set to adapt the screenplay, along with Simon Kinberg and Aditya Sood producing. The film had been in development hell for several years due to the Disney-Fox merger, along with budgetary and technical issues. During promotion of Project Hail Mary (another adaptation of a Weir novel), Lord & Miller expressed renewed interest in directing Artemis, with hopes to start the project after finishing Spider-Man: Beyond the Spider-Verse.

In October 2023, writer Dennis E. Taylor, author of the Bobiverse series, announced that a potential adaptation had been optioned to Lord Miller Productions for distribution through Universal Pictures.

In August 2025, it was announced that Lord and Miller would be developing a feature adaptation film based on Archie Comics at Universal Pictures, with Tom King attached to pen the screenplay.

Lord and Miller are producing a film adaptation of the crime drama television series Murder, She Wrote, which was set to release on December 22, 2027 before being pushed back to February 4, 2028, a month later.

Lord and Miller are producing a sequel to The Mitchells vs. the Machines.

In June 2026, it was announced that the duo would produce Universal Pictures' I Promise We’re Cool, a "high concept comedy".

=== Other projects ===
Lord co-wrote the comic Spider-Man Annual #1, marking his first involvement on a comic book; he and Miller also co-wrote a Marvel comic celebrating the company's 80th anniversary, marking Miller's first time writing a comic book.

In September 2020, it was announced that a live-action television series based on the character Silk was in development, with both Lord and Miller serving as executive producers alongside Amy Pascal. The series, which is part of Sony's Spider-Man Universe, would be ordered by MGM+ and Amazon Prime Video under the title Silk: Spider Society, with Angela Kang serving as the showrunner. However, in February 2024, the series was redeveloped for a more "male-skewing" audience with the writers' room paused, and in May the same year, Amazon dropped the series, with Sony shopping it to other potential buyers.

Lord and Miller produced a Spanish-language drama film, Los Frikis.

== Style and influences ==
Lord and Miller are regarded as auteur filmmakers, although they dislike being associated with that term. Their films are noted for their bold visual sensation, extensive detail, usage of improvisation, and metamodernist approach to narrative and aesthetics. Though they slightly change their process between live-action and animation, Lord & Miller typically favor a formalist aesthetic, with hard cuts, usage of primary colors, and exaggerated mise-en-scene being defining parts of their style.

Thematically, their films explore friendship, creativity, and being an outsider. Much of their process was influenced by their time at Clone High and Cloudy, where they learned from future collaborator Amy Pascal about collaboration and emotion. They admit to using properties like LEGO, Jump Street, and Spider-Verse as a springboard for personal expression, with Lord stating: "It comes from trying not to be vain about what you're making on the surface...Like, who cares if [The Lego Movie is] based on a popular toy brand? It's still an opportunity to make something really interesting. I think we've always approached these things as a way to express ourselves personally, which no one does!" Because of this approach, their work gained a following for transforming "cynical" studio concepts into critically acclaimed and commercially successful films. Due to their hands-on filmmaking process and improvisational approach to storytelling, they are seen as perfectionists.

Lord and Miller have cited Robert Altman, Hal Ashby, Stanley Kubrick, Bill Plympton, the Coen brothers, Spike Lee, Akira Kurosawa, Billy Wilder, Chuck Jones, Matt Groening, George Lucas, Ingmar Bergman, Jim Henson, and Tim Burton as influences. Their favorite films include The Wizard of Oz (1939), Rashomon (1950), Singin' in the Rain (1952), 2001: A Space Odyssey (1968), McCabe & Mrs. Miller (1971), Harold and Maude (1971), The Hot Rock (1972), Star Wars (1977), The Muppet Movie (1979), Popeye (1980), American Pop (1981), Howard the Duck (1986), Matewan (1987), The Beaver Trilogy (2000), and Speed Racer (2008).

== Filmography ==
=== Film ===
Year	Title	Director(s)	Writer(s)	Producer(s)
2008	Extreme Movie	No	Yes	No
2009	Cloudy with a Chance of Meatballs	Yes	Yes	No
2012	21 Jump Street	Yes	No	No
2013	Cloudy with a Chance of Meatballs 2	No	Story	Executive
2014	The Lego Movie	Yes	Yes	No
2014	22 Jump Street	Yes	No	Executive
2016	Storks	No	No	Executive
2017	Brigsby Bear	No	No	Yes
2017	The Lego Batman Movie	No	No	Yes
2017	The Lego Ninjago Movie	No	No	Yes
2018	Solo: A Star Wars Story	Uncredited	No	Executive
2018	Smallfoot	No	No	Executive
2018	Spider-Man: Into the Spider-Verse	No	Phil Lord	Yes
2019	The Lego Movie 2: The Second Part	No	Yes	Yes
2021	The Mitchells vs. the Machines	No	No	Yes
2021	America: The Motion Picture	No	No	Yes
2023	Cocaine Bear	No	No	Yes
2023	Spider-Man: Across the Spider-Verse	No	Yes	Yes
2023	Strays	No	No	Yes
2024	Los Frikis	No	No	Yes
2026	Project Hail Mary	Yes	Additional Screenplay Material	Yes
2026	The Sheep Detectives	No	No	Executive
2027	Spider-Man: Beyond the Spider-Verse	No	Yes	

Other credits

Year	Title	Notes
2006	Open Season	Special thanks
2007	Surf's Up	Special thanks
2008	Igor	Special thanks
2014	Annie	Directors: MoonQuake Lake scenes
2016	Sausage Party	Special thanks
2016	Rogue One: A Star Wars Story	Special thanks
2017	Baby Driver	Special thanks
2023	The Spider Within: A Spider-Verse Story	Special thanks Credited as Lord Miller Productions

=== Television ===
Year	Title	Creators / Showrunners	Directors	Writers	Producers	Notes
1999–2000	Zoe, Duncan, Jack and Jane	No		Yes	No	Episode: "Crossing the Line"
2001	Go Fish	No		Yes	No	Episode: "Go Wrestling"
2002–2003, 2023–2024	Clone High	Yes	Supervising	Yes	Executive	33 episodes
2003	Luis	No	No	No	Supervising	5 episodes
2004	Method & Red	No	No	Yes	Consulting	9 episodes Episodes: "Well Well Well", "Da Shootout" and "A House Apart"
2004	Cracking Up	No	No	No	Consulting	6 episodes
2005–2006	How I Met Your Mother	No	No	Yes	Executive	17 episodes Episodes: "Sweet Taste of Liberty" and "Belly Full of Turkey"
2013	Brooklyn Nine-Nine	No	Yes	No	Executive	Episode: "Pilot"
2015–2018	The Last Man on Earth	No	Yes	No	Executive	67 episodes Episodes: "Alive in Tucson" and "The Elephant in the Room"
2016–2017	Son of Zorn	No	No	No	Executive	13 episodes
2017	Making History	No	No	No	Executive	9 episodes
2017–2018	Cloudy with a Chance of Meatballs	No	No	No	Consulting	104 episodes
2017–2020	Unikitty!	No	No	No	Executive	104 episodes
2019–2021	Bless the Harts	No	No	No	Executive	34 episodes
2020	Hoops	No	No	No	Executive	10 episodes
2022–2023	The Afterparty	Christopher Miller		Yes	Executive	Miller: Showrunner, directed 10 episodes and wrote 6 episodes Lord: wrote "Zoe"
2026	Spider-Noir	Developers	No		Executive	

Acting credits

Year	Title	Role as		Notes
Year	Title	Phil Lord	Christopher Miller	Notes
1997	The Empire Strikes Back	—N/a	Stormtrooper	Special Edition
1998–1999	Caroline in the City	Bill	Cliff	3 episodes
2002–2003, 2023–2024	Clone High	Principal Dr. Cinnamon J. Scudworth / Genghis Khan	JFK / Vice Principal Mr. Butlertron	Voice roles, 33 episodes
2007	How I Met Your Mother	Too Much Tongue Guy	—N/a	Episode: "How I Met Everyone Else"
2009	Cloudy with a Chance of Meatballs	Additional Voices	New York Homeless Man/Rat Birds	Voice roles
2014	The Lego Movie	—N/a	TV announcer	Voice role
2015	A Lego Brickumentary	Himself		Documentary film
2019	The Lego Movie 2: The Second Part	—N/a	Chad, horse, chocolate bar, Plantimals, Paperboy	Voice role
2020	Lego Masters	Himself		Episode: "Movie Genres"
TBA	Shrek 2 Retold	TBA	Prince Charming	Voice roles

== Awards and nominations ==
Year	Award	Nominated work	Result
2009	Satellite Award for Best Animated or Mixed Media Feature	Cloudy with a Chance of Meatballs	Nominated
2010	Golden Globe Award for Best Animated Feature Film	Cloudy with a Chance of Meatballs	Nominated
2010	Critics' Choice Movie Award for Best Animated Feature	Cloudy with a Chance of Meatballs	Nominated
2010	Annie Award for Best Animated Feature	Cloudy with a Chance of Meatballs	Nominated
2010	Annie Award for Directing in a Feature Production	Cloudy with a Chance of Meatballs	Nominated
2010	Annie Award for Writing in a Feature Production	Cloudy with a Chance of Meatballs	Nominated
2012	Teen Choice Award for Choice Movie: Comedy	21 Jump Street	Won
2013	People's Choice Award for Favorite Comedy Movie	21 Jump Street	Nominated
2013	Critics' Choice Movie Award for Best Comedy	21 Jump Street	Nominated
2013	Empire Award for Best Comedy	21 Jump Street	Nominated
2014	Teen Choice Award for Choice Summer Movie	22 Jump Street	Won
2014	National Board of Review: Top Ten Films	The Lego Movie	Won
2014	National Board of Review Award for Best Original Screenplay	The Lego Movie	Won
2014	Washington D.C. Area Film Critics Association Award for Best Animated Feature	The Lego Movie	Won
2014	Washington D.C. Area Film Critics Association Award for Best Original Screenplay	The Lego Movie	Nominated
2014	New York Film Critics Circle Award for Best Animated Film	The Lego Movie	Won
2014	New York Film Critics Online Award for Best Animated Film	The Lego Movie	Won
2014	San Diego Film Critics Society Award for Best Animated Film	The Lego Movie	Nominated
2014	Online Film Critics Society Award for Best Picture	The Lego Movie	Nominated
2014	Online Film Critics Society Award for Best Animated Film	The Lego Movie	Won
2014	Chicago Film Critics Association Award for Best Animated Film	The Lego Movie	Won
2014	Dallas–Fort Worth Film Critics Association Award for Best Animated Film	The Lego Movie	Won
2014	Kansas City Film Critics Circle Award for Best Animated Film	The Lego Movie	Won
2014	San Francisco Film Critics Circle Award for Best Animated Feature	The Lego Movie	Won
2014	St. Louis Gateway Film Critics Association Award for Best Animated Film	The Lego Movie	Won
2015	People's Choice Award for Favorite Movie	22 Jump Street	Nominated
2015	People's Choice Award for Favorite Comedic Movie	22 Jump Street	Won
2015	People's Choice Award for Favorite Family Movie	The Lego Movie	Nominated
2015	Golden Globe Award for Best Animated Feature Film	The Lego Movie	Nominated
2015	Critics' Choice Movie Award for Best Animated Feature	The Lego Movie	Won
2015	Critics' Choice Movie Award for Best Comedy	22 Jump Street	Nominated
2015	Annie Award for Best Animated Feature	The Lego Movie	Nominated
2015	Annie Award for Directing in an Animated Feature Production	The Lego Movie	Nominated
2015	Annie Award for Writing in an Animated Feature Production	The Lego Movie	Won
2015	Satellite Award for Best Animated or Mixed Media Feature	The Lego Movie	Nominated
2015	Satellite Award for Best Original Screenplay	The Lego Movie	Nominated
2015	BAFTA Award for Best Animated Film	The Lego Movie	Won
2015	Saturn Award for Best Animated Film	The Lego Movie	Won
2015	Primetime Emmy Award for Outstanding Directing for a Comedy Series	The Last Man on Earth	Nominated
2015	Monmouth Award for Communication Excellence (MACE)	Lifetime contributions in the field of communications	Won
2018	Producers Guild of America Award for Best Animated Motion Picture (With Dan Lin)	The Lego Batman Movie	Nominated
2019	Annie Award for Best Animated Feature	Spider-Man: Into the Spider-Verse	Won
2019	Producers Guild of America Award for Best Animated Motion Picture (With Avi Arad, Amy Pascal and Christina Steinberg)	Spider-Man: Into the Spider-Verse	Won
2019	Annie Award for Writing in a Feature Production (Only Phil Lord) (With Rodney Rothman)	Spider-Man: Into the Spider-Verse	Won
2019	BAFTA Award for Best Animated Film (Only Phil Lord)	Spider-Man: Into the Spider-Verse	Won
2019	Golden Globe Award for Best Animated Feature Film	Spider-Man: Into the Spider-Verse	Won
2019	Academy Award for Best Animated Feature (With Bob Persichetti, Peter Ramsey and Rodney Rothman)	Spider-Man: Into the Spider-Verse	Won
2020	Chicago Indie Critics for Best Animated Film (With Dan Lin, Roy Lee and Jinko Gotoh)	The Lego Movie 2: The Second Part	Nominated
2021	SCAD Savannah Film Festival Outstanding Achievement in Animation	The Mitchells vs. the Machines	Won
2021	Academy Award for Best Animated Feature (With Mike Rianda and Kurt Albrecht)	The Mitchells vs. the Machines	Nominated
2021	BAFTA Award for Best Animated Film (With Mike Rianda and Kurt Albrecht)	The Mitchells vs. the Machines	Nominated
2021	Producers Guild of America Award for Best Animated Motion Picture (With Kurt Albrecht)	The Mitchells vs. the Machines	Nominated
2022	Hollywood Critics Association TV Award for Best Directing in a Streaming Comedy Series (Only Christopher Miller)	The Afterparty ("Yasper")	Nominated
2022	Hollywood Critics Association TV Award for Best Writing in a Streaming Comedy Series (Only Christopher Miller)	The Afterparty ("Maggie")	Nominated
2023	Honorary Degree, Doctor of Arts (Christopher Miller)	Dartmouth College	Won
2023	Honorary Degree, Doctor of Arts (Phil Lord)	Dartmouth College	Won
2024	Annie Award for Best Animated Feature	Spider-Man: Across the Spider-Verse	Won
2024	Producers Guild of America Award for Best Animated Motion Picture (With Avi Arad, Amy Pascal and Christina Steinberg)	Spider-Man: Across the Spider-Verse	Won
2024	BAFTA Award for Best Animated Film	Spider-Man: Across the Spider-Verse	Nominated
2024	Golden Globe Award for Best Animated Feature Film	Spider-Man: Across the Spider-Verse	Nominated
2024	Academy Award for Best Animated Feature (With Kemp Powers, Justin K. Thompson, and Amy Pascal)	Spider-Man: Across the Spider-Verse	Nominated

== See also ==
- Phil Lord and Christopher Miller's unrealized projects
