= The Drunk Train =

- How I Met Your Mother episode
- Episode no.: Season 7 Episode 16
- Directed by: Pamela Fryman
- Written by: Craig Gerard; Matthew Zinman
- Production code: 7ALH16
- Original air date: February 13, 2012

Guest appearances
- Becki Newton as Quinn; Kal Penn as Kevin; Melissa Soso as Jenni; Guy Nardulli as Vinny; Nicole Zeoli as Lindsay; Lindsey Morgan as Lauren; Nicole Shabtai as Gina; Johnny Giacalone as Ronnie; Rachel Bloom as Wanda; Kim Hidalgo as Randi; Brandi Burkhardt as Candice

Episode chronology
← Previous "The Burning Beekeeper"	Next → "No Pressure"
- How I Met Your Mother (season 7)

"The Drunk Train" is the 16th episode of the seventh season of the CBS sitcom How I Met Your Mother, and the 152nd episode overall. It aired on February 13, 2012.

== Plot ==
Because Ted asked him to be his wingman, Barney meets a woman named Quinn who sees through all of his plays. To compensate for the poor night out, Barney insists that he and Ted try their luck on the late-night "Drunk Train", the last train out of the city, which is filled with the drunkest, most desperate bridge and tunnel people. The duo runs into difficulty scoring on the train, but they succeed on their third attempt when they find a solution: getting drunk themselves, until Barney reveals that he and Quinn had hooked up that first night. Ted realizes that Barney keeps thinking about Quinn, and tells him that if he feels something for her he should go after her, as it is Valentine's Day and such opportunities are rare. Ted admits that he is disappointed that he still has no-one he cannot stop thinking about. At the end of the night, Barney takes a cab ride with a woman but stops himself short of having sex with her. When she asks if he has a girlfriend, he replies that maybe someday he will.

On a couples retreat for Valentine's Day, Marshall and Lily try to show Robin and Kevin that the success to a long-term relationship is not to "keep score". Lily and Marshall eventually end up bickering over the issue, but when they return home they decide, as impending parents, that they should work together as a team and no longer keep score. On the weekend trip Kevin proposes to Robin, who wants to accept but must decide how to tell him that she cannot have children and does not ever want them. After consulting Marshall and Lily, she tells Kevin, who still wants to marry her. However, because Robin does not want Kevin to regret marrying her, she firmly tells him that she does not want to have children ever, not even by adoption, forcing Kevin to truly reflect on the issue. He then takes back the proposal and they break up.

When Ted and Robin meet on the roof, Robin explains everything to him and confesses that she finally feels ready to have a serious relationship but believes she will not be able to find someone who can accept her now. In response, Ted says that he could and tells her he loves her.

Meanwhile, unknown to Barney, Quinn is revealed to be a dancer at the Lusty Leopard strip club and comments that he should have recognized her earlier due to his frequent visits. Quinn is actually the stripper 'Karma' whom Barney knew.

== Critical response ==
Donna Bowman of the A.V. Club gave the episode a B, stating that Marshall and Lily's story inter-cutting with Kevin and Robin's made it a "return to form" after the disappointment of the previous episode.

Alan Sepinwall of Hitfix.com said Robin's breakup with Kevin and Ted's admission of feelings for her is part of Victoria's warning at the end of "Ducky Tie" coming true.

Ethan Alter of Television Without Pity gave the episode a C−, stating that he dreaded the consequences of Ted's confession to Robin for the rest of the season. Audience reviews were reported to be similarly negative.
