= The Naked Truth (How I Met Your Mother) =

- How I Met Your Mother episode
- Episode no.: Season 7 Episode 2
- Directed by: Pamela Fryman
- Written by: Stephen Lloyd
- Production code: 7ALH02
- Original air date: September 19, 2011

Guest appearances
- Nazanin Boniadi as Nora; Martin Short as Garrison Cootes; Jimmi Simpson as Pete Durkenson; Ashley Williams as Victoria

Episode chronology
← Previous "The Best Man"	Next → "Ducky Tie"
- How I Met Your Mother (season 7)

"The Naked Truth" is the second episode of the seventh season of the CBS sitcom How I Met Your Mother, and the 138th episode overall. It first aired on September 19, 2011.

== Plot ==
Marshall receives a call from Garrison Cootes, a partner at one of the nation's largest environmental law firms. He tells Marshall that the company is interested in Marshall's application for employment, and he will receive a job offer after the company completes an extensive background check. The background check concerns Marshall, who fears that a college-era video of him streaking through Wesleyan calling himself "Beercules", could result in Garrison dropping the job offer. Marshall contacts the uploader, an old college acquaintance, and asks him to remove the video. However, Marshall ends up getting drunk and streaking again after inadvertently playing Edward Fortyhands with Pete, and thus another "Beercules" video is uploaded. Eventually, Garrison does see the video, but offers Marshall a job anyway; the video is not an issue with him.

Thinking about a date with Nora, Barney appears to the gang in a leg cast and crutches, hoping to gain Nora's sympathy. He meets Nora at a 24-hour diner, where he is forced to explain to her all the plays he ever made on women, one of which irks one of his previous partners in an adjoining booth who overhears the conversation. Nora leaves, angry at Barney for lying to her. To prove to Nora that he will never lie to her again, Barney vows not to leave the diner until she agrees to a second date. The gang eats at the diner nine hours later and sees Barney wake up. True to his word, he does stay at the diner the whole time, which impresses Nora when she comes back.

Ted capitalizes on being featured in New York magazine, speaking to women at newsstands when they pick up a copy. From the connections made during this role, he dates two women who he had met. With Lily's and Robin's help, he must decide on one of the women as a date to the exclusive "Architect's Ball". Robin thinks that the event will be boring, but hints that she would like to become Ted's date when he mentions that Lenny Kravitz will be at the event, since she is an avid fan of the rock star. Ted winds up taking Robin to the gala, where she discovers that the Lenny Kravitz Ted was referring to is an old architect, Leonard Kravitz. Disappointed, Robin leaves the party. While looking at the gala guests, he sees his former girlfriend Victoria arranging cupcakes at a table and they establish eye contact.

== Critical response ==
Donna Bowman of The A.V. Club graded the episode a B. Robert Canning of IGN gave the show an 8 out of 10. Angel Cohn of Television Without Pity gave the episode a C.

Despite the show being in its 7th season this episode premiered to 12.22 million viewers, making it the show's third most watched episode, only behind the two-part series finale "Last Forever" and season one's "The Pineapple Incident".
