= No Pressure (How I Met Your Mother) =

- How I Met Your Mother episode
- Episode no.: Season 7 Episode 17
- Directed by: Pamela Fryman
- Written by: George Sloan
- Production code: 7ALH15
- Original air date: February 20, 2012

Guest appearances
- Conan O'Brien as Bar Patron, uncredited; Ellen D. Williams as Patrice

Episode chronology
← Previous "The Drunk Train"	Next → "Karma"
- How I Met Your Mother (season 7)

"No Pressure" is the 17th episode of the seventh season of the CBS sitcom How I Met Your Mother, and the 153rd episode overall. It aired on February 20, 2012.

== Plot ==
Future Ted tells his children that the day that he told their mother he loved her was significant because he had not said those words to anyone since he confessed to Robin that he still loved her. In the aftermath of Ted's confession, he reminds Robin that five years ago their thoughts on the future were too different, and they broke up. He heads to bed but Robin surprises him by kissing him the next morning. Before they can talk about how Ted's confession could change their platonic relationship and status as roommates, Robin suddenly has to leave to work on a story in Moscow — she thought she had another twelve hours before she had to leave. After Ted hurriedly helps her pack, she kisses him again before leaving, promising to continue the conversation with him once she gets back.

Meanwhile, a hungover Barney wakes up at Lily and Marshall's house after taking the "drunk train" and becomes convinced that they have a sex tape hidden somewhere in their house despite Lily's insistence that there is not one. While searching for it with the aid of some cleaning women, he finds a box of long-term bets they have been keeping, one of which involves Lily betting Marshall that Ted and Robin will not end up together. As Ted tells Marshall and Lily what happened between him and Robin (with Lily encouraging Ted's ill-judged plans of an elaborate welcome home party), Barney arrives and calls Marshall and Lily out on their numerous long-term bets. When Barney learns that one of the bets confirms the existence of a sex tape, he returns to Marshall and Lily's house and eventually finds the tape. Ted learns of the bet regarding his relationship with Robin and becomes upset with Lily, who forces Ted to consider why he has not gotten back together with Robin in the past five years.

After successfully finding the sex tape, Barney returns to Ted's apartment to use his VCR. When Ted considers that the reason why he and Robin never got back together was because she is in love with Barney, he is surprised with Barney's tepid reaction. Barney tells Ted everything that happened between him and Robin, saying, "Whatever I thought was there, she thought differently", and despite being told that Robin and Kevin broke up, he gives his blessing to Ted if he and Robin begin dating again. However, before they can watch the sex tape, Marshall and Lily arrive to try to win the bet involving the sex tape—Lily wins if Barney watches it, while Marshall wins if Barney does not. After scaring Barney with possible images that he will not want to see, Marshall wins the bet when Barney destroys Ted's VCR.

When Robin returns from Russia, she and Ted have the chance to re-examine their relationship. Ted picks her up at the airport and takes her to dinner at the Brooklyn bistro where they had their first date. Then at home, he realizes that they are not going to work out and turns down Robin's consolation that they still have an agreement to get married if they are both single at age 40. When Ted asks if Robin loves him, Robin admits that she does not and feels comfortable with them as friends. Ted asks her to forget that the past week ever happened.

Ted tells Marshall that he is giving up on the idea of being with Robin in any romantic context, and says he is happy about this because he knows he can finally move on from her. Marshall knows Ted is lying and that it is killing him on the inside, so he tells Robin that she should move out for Ted's sake, which she agrees to do, leaving Ted forlorn and alone on the roof of his apartment building. Some time later, as future Ted tells his children that getting closure on his relationship with Robin finally opened the possibility of meeting their mother, Ted walks out of MacLaren's Bar as all the people on the street walk by with yellow umbrellas. At their house, Lily, convinced that this is the definite end of Ted and Robin, asks Marshall to pay up on their bet. Echoing his words at Ted's wedding to Stella, Marshall refuses, smiles and then says "Not yet".

== Cameo appearance by Conan O'Brien ==
Talk show host Conan O'Brien makes a very brief cameo appearance in the episode as a non-speaking patron at MacLaren's; he can be seen in the first part of the episode, watching on as Barney races out of the bar. O'Brien won the role via a 2011 charity auction. According to show co-creator Carter Bays, when the show's writers and producers first learned that O'Brien won the auction, they started to brainstorm ideas about what he could play. O'Brien, however, replied back that he just wanted to be an extra who would blend in. "We realized this was really the funniest version [of a cameo]", said Bays. "In New York, every now and then you'll see somebody famous at a bar, but nobody really makes a big deal out of it."

== Critical response ==
Donna Bowman of The A.V. Club gave the episode an A−.

After being particularly critical of the previous episode, Television Without Pity's Ethan Alter gave "No Pressure" a B, stating that the Ted and Robin storyline was "mercifully brief" but criticised Lily and Marshall for breaking character.
