= Karma (How I Met Your Mother) =

- How I Met Your Mother episode
- Episode no.: Season 7 Episode 18
- Directed by: Pamela Fryman
- Written by: Stephen Lloyd
- Production code: 7ALH18
- Original air date: February 27, 2012

Guest appearances
- Becki Newton as Quinn / Karma; Ellen D. Williams as Patrice

Episode chronology
← Previous "No Pressure"	Next → "The Broath"
- How I Met Your Mother (season 7)

"Karma" is the 18th episode of the seventh season of the CBS sitcom How I Met Your Mother, and the 154th episode overall. It aired on February 27, 2012.

== Plot ==
Barney decides to pursue Quinn, even after discovering she works as a stripper named Karma. Although she appears interested, she avoids answering Barney as he continuously tries to ask her out on a second date, claiming that her boss is always watching. When Barney sees Quinn behaving similarly towards another client, he realizes Quinn was just playing him, tells her off for it and storms out of the club, leaving her feeling guilty. Barney later runs into Quinn at a coffee shop, where she defends her behaviour and tells him off for failing to recognize her even though she has worked at the Lusty Leopard for a year. When she mentions a number of things that Barney mentioned to her, he is impressed that she remembered; she admits she finds him interesting. Out of guilt, she buys him a coffee and he accepts her offer to sit down together to talk.

Robin has temporarily moved in with Lily and Marshall, but becomes annoyed at their mundane lifestyle. When she attempts to flee one night, Lily and Marshall catch her. They admit they find the suburbs boring, but believe it is best for their future child. Robin tells them that if they are unhappy with where they live, that will not make it the best place for their child. Robin finally moves out to stay at Patrice's apartment.

Since Robin has moved out, Ted attempts to take his mind off of her by using her empty room for various hobbies such as smoking meats, woodworking, and pottery. Robin goes to meet Ted later, and helps him realize that some things should not be forced and that one should instead just move on. A few days later, Lily and Marshall receive a message from Ted to come hang out in the city, and the two eagerly rush off. When arriving at Ted's apartment, they find the place empty and a note from Ted. Ted never took their names off the lease, and he has decided to move out for good as he needs a change. He gives the apartment to Marshall and Lily and has decided that Robin's old room should be used for their baby.

== Critical response ==
The A.V. Club's Katherine Miller graded the episode a B. She commended the show for dealing with common complaints about the show this season, giving more time to tertiary characters and making a significant change to the living arrangements.

Ethan Alter of Television Without Pity gave the episode a B−.

IGN gave the episode 7 out of 10.

Chris O'Hara of TV Fanatic gave the episode a score of 4.0 out of 5.
