= Symphony of Illumination =

- How I Met Your Mother episode
- Episode no.: Season 7 Episode 12
- Directed by: Pamela Fryman
- Written by: Joe Kelly
- Production code: 7ALH12
- Original air date: December 5, 2011

Guest appearances
- Vicki Lewis as Dr. Sonya; Chase Ellison as Scott; Todd Grinnell as Insane Duane; Danielle Weeks as Sheila; Andra Nechita as Robin's daughter; Noah Schnacky as Robin's son

Episode chronology
← Previous "The Rebound Girl"	Next → "Tailgate"
- How I Met Your Mother (season 7)

"Symphony of Illumination" is the 12th episode of the seventh season of the CBS sitcom How I Met Your Mother, and the 148th episode overall. It aired on December 5, 2011. The episode is a continuation of the previous episode, "The Rebound Girl".

It is the second most critically acclaimed episode of the 7th season (behind "Tick Tick Tick"), and has been well reviewed by critics, especially for its ending.

== Plot ==
Instead of Future Ted narrating to his kids as usual, this episode opens with Robin telling her two kids about the time she revealed to their father that she was pregnant. The scene cuts to Barney and Robin in the bathroom of Marshall and Lily's Long Island house, where Robin explains that she is a week late with her period, and has a doctor's appointment to find out if she is pregnant. She also reveals that she and Kevin have not yet had sex, meaning that if she is pregnant, Barney is the father. Although Barney is giddy at the prospect of becoming a father, Robin is still firmly against having children of her own. Barney comes to share her reservations when he sees how the life of an old friend, "Insane Duane", has changed since marrying and having children. Both Robin and Barney are relieved when the doctor informs them that Robin is not pregnant.

For a day Robin celebrates not being pregnant, until she receives additional news from the doctor: she is unable to have children. Robin struggles to find a way to tell her friends, so she lies and says instead that she is disappointed at not making the Canadian women's pole vaulting team. The others notice that Robin has been acting strange lately, and try to figure out why. After Ted and Lily joke that Robin hooked up with Barney, Ted assumes that she is homesick for Canada. When Ted offers her plane tickets for a Christmas visit to his home town in Cleveland, Ohio, Robin rejects the offer and tells him that he should not feel responsible for cheering her up. She goes for a walk in Central Park, where it is revealed that the kids Robin is telling the story to exist only in her imagination, and she is only talking to herself on a park bench as she begins to come to terms with her bad news.

She returns to the apartment to discover an intricate Christmas light display, animated and accompanied by vigorous AC/DC music, which Ted has erected. He tells her that while she does not have to tell him what happened, he will never stop trying to cheer her up. Robin dissolves into tears and is comforted by Ted, as Future Ted tells his kids that Robin never became a pole vaulter, but did become a famous journalist, traveled the world and even enjoyed a stint as a bullfighter; he also notes that she was never alone.

Meanwhile, Marshall wants to have better Christmas decorations than neighborhood rival Richard Holdman. He plans an entire display, which he names the "Symphony of Illumination" for the Long Island house, complete with Mannheim Steamroller Christmas music. When he begins the installation, he gratefully accepts an offer of assistance from a neighborhood teenager, Scott. However, Scott leaves him stranded on the roof, steals Marshall's phone and uses it to his advantage when texting Lily, and throws a party in Marshall's house. Though Marshall briefly relents, recalling his own antics when he was young, he is outraged when he sees Scott abusing a giant stocking that his late grandmother had knitted for Marshall's future child. He remains stranded on the roof until Lily arrives, unwittingly paying Scott 50 dollars for his help, and then sees the damage Scott has caused inside the house during the party.

== Reception ==
=== Critical reception ===
The episode received very positive reviews, with viewers praising the Robin-centred plot.

Donna Bowman of The A.V. Club graded the episode an A, observing that "If this episode is any indication—in what (HIMYM) can accomplish, because of what we’ve come to feel about the characters and because of the confidence with which it is moving forward in its overarching story—HIMYM has never been healthier."

Chris O'Hara of TV Fanatic gave this episode a 4.8 out of 5, praising Cobie Smulders' performance.

Eric Goldman of IGN gave the episode 8 out of 10 saying "I do think the show needs to finally stop playing so coy with so many carrot-dangling ideas – this episode didn't do anything to kill the possibility that Barney is marrying Robin at that wedding, after all. And HIMYM has done even better "dramatic" episodes, such as Marshall's storyline about his father dying last year. But as the show goes into its later years, and has become far more uneven, I did appreciate that I still cared about Robin and what she was going through here – and the sweetness of Ted being there to comfort her as a good friend at the end."

=== Ratings ===
This episode attracted 11.51 million American viewers, making it the fourth most viewed episode of the entire series. In Canada the episode was viewed by 1.028 million viewers, placing sixth for the night.
