= Now We're Even =

- How I Met Your Mother episode
- Episode no.: Season 7 Episode 21
- Directed by: Pamela Fryman
- Written by: Chuck Tatham
- Production code: 7ALH22
- Original air date: April 16, 2012

Guest appearances
- Becki Newton as Quinn; Alexis Denisof as Sandy Rivers; Marshall Manesh as Ranjit; Eben Ham as Pilot; Bryan Krasner as Gary

Episode chronology
← Previous "Trilogy Time"	Next → "Good Crazy"
- How I Met Your Mother (season 7)

"Now We're Even" is the 21st episode of the seventh season of the CBS sitcom How I Met Your Mother, and the 157th episode overall. It aired on April 16, 2012. The episode ties up with the events indicated in "The Mermaid Theory" in Season 6.

== Plot ==
Ted begins to get accustomed to life alone in his apartment. Barney invites Ted to "make every night legendary" by doing many things like establishing a mariachi band and bringing a horse inside MacLaren's. Before long, Ted resists Barney's invitations and shuns his offer to bungee-jump off the Statue of Liberty. Barney locks Ted out of the apartment to make him go out on the town, but Ted just heads down to MacLaren's to call his apartment superintendent for help. When pressed by Ted, Barney admits that he needs to get his mind off Quinn during her shift at the Lusty Leopard. Remembering an earlier conversation from 2010, Ted takes up a dare to get a woman's number while wearing a sun dress.

Marshall is distraught upon learning that Lily had a sex dream about someone else. As they go out on a fancy dinner date, he finds out that Ranjit is the one Lily dreamed about and confronts her on the road. Lily angrily leaves him and seeks advice from Quinn. Later over dinner, Marshall and Ranjit talk about the dreams and Ranjit counsels him that part of being a good husband and father is remaining calm while everyone else acts crazy. Marshall realizes that all the men in Lily's sex dreams were all great fathers. Back at the apartment, Marshall and Lily make up, though Lily keeps her wildest sex dreams a secret.

Although Robin has been promoted at World Wide News, she is disappointed that the front desk guard does not recognize her, while letting everybody else through without requesting ID. Sandy Rivers asks her to deliver the night-time traffic reports from a network helicopter, where the pilot suffers a stroke. She successfully lands the helicopter with help from the ground as the incident is covered live. Future Ted reveals that the incident made Robin an instant star – which resulted in her meeting Mayor Michael Bloomberg, appearing on Letterman, and having a special deli sandwich named after her. As she goes home, she receives a text message from Ted telling her that, even though they are not talking right now, he is glad to know she is okay.

== Reception ==
Donna Bowman of The A.V. Club gave the episode a B.

Michelle Profis of Entertainment Weekly lauded the episode for its "eclectic mix" of multiple elements.

Robert Canning of IGN gave the episode an 8 out of 10.

Ethan Alter of Television Without Pity gave the episode a D+ explaining that "spinning its wheels is really the only thing this show is consistently good at anymore".
