= Tailgate (How I Met Your Mother) =

- How I Met Your Mother episode
- Episode no.: Season 7 Episode 13
- Directed by: Pamela Fryman
- Written by: Carter Bays; Craig Thomas
- Production code: 7ALH13
- Original air date: January 2, 2012

Guest appearances
- Bill Fagerbakke as Marvin Sr.; Chris Elliott as Mickey Aldrin; Will Sasso as Doug; Kal Penn as Kevin; Alexis Denisof as Sandy Rivers; Chasty Ballesteros as Tina

Episode chronology
← Previous "Symphony of Illumination"	Next → "46 Minutes"
- How I Met Your Mother (season 7)

"Tailgate" is the 13th episode of the seventh season of the CBS sitcom How I Met Your Mother, and the 149th episode overall. It aired on January 2, 2012.

== Plot ==
On New Year's Day 2012, Marshall visits his father's gravesite to carry on their tradition of tailgating, listening to the Chicago Bears vs. Minnesota Vikings NFL football game on the radio. However, his attempts to have a private moment with his father are derailed when his brothers arrive with the same idea and then mourners at another funeral nearby gradually drift over and join Marshall's tailgating party. Nevertheless, Marshall tells the story at his father's grave of how he, Lily, Ted, Barney and Robin spent New Year's Eve.

Prior to the cemetery scene, this is what the five are doing:

Lily and Marshall are decorating the baby's bedroom in East Meadow when Marshall learns that Lily has not yet told her dad that she is pregnant. Marshall convinces her to call her father, who is in Chicago at a board-game convention, but Lily is disappointed with her father's nonchalant reaction. Next, Marshall decides to narrate his favourite childhood book "Enigmas of the Mystical", but Lily admits she cannot believe any of the stories. Realizing that Lily is upset, Marshall apologizes and explains he acted that way because his dad made him believe in the magical. Lily reveals that her dad taught her not to believe in anything but herself.

In the meantime, Ted and Barney turn Ted's apartment into an impromptu bar, calling it "Puzzles", after becoming frustrated with how difficult it is to get to MacLaren's during the New Year's Eve crush. They recruit Kevin to operate the bar, and Doug (the MacLaren's bouncer) as bouncer. They initially plan on providing drinks at reasonable prices, but are eventually forced to increase the price when they have trouble managing the rowdy patrons, who eventually all leave.

Robin is called into work on New Year's Eve because Sandy Rivers, the TV anchor, begins drinking on air when the female producer for World Wide News breaks up with him. He then disappears entirely. Robin struggles to get Sandy back on air, but close to midnight he disappears again. She calls Kevin in despair, who convinces her to take Sandy's place, even though he later finds a comatose Sandy in Ted's bathtub, which Kevin does not reveal to Robin. Robin takes his advice and Kevin, Ted, and Barney watch Robin as she anchors the New Year's Eve broadcast. Future Ted reveals that this became the turning point in Robin's career, gaining her a promotion to Sandy's co-host.

By the time Marshall has finished his story, there are many people with him, with Marshall increasingly annoyed at those trying to take advantage of the game and his food. When Marshall is on his last nerve, someone accidentally calls him Marvin, his father's name, saying Marshall is just like his dad. Marshall then recalls how his father always welcomed people at all their previous tailgate parties, and asks his brothers to join him, deciding that private moments are overrated.

In East Meadow, Lily opens the door to her house and unexpectedly finds her father with a giant teddy bear. He reveals that right after he heard her news, he drove all night from Chicago to see her and tells her how excited he is for her. A tear-struck Lily thanks her father and hugs him.

=== Continuity ===
The Puzzles bar concept was previously referenced in the Season 4 episode "Three Days of Snow" (2009), in which Ted and Barney first conceived of the idea of opening their own bar. The episode also marks the first significant career development for Robin Scherbatsky at World Wide News, as Future Ted reveals that her impromptu anchoring of the New Year's Eve broadcast led directly to her promotion as Sandy Rivers' co-anchor.

== Reception ==
"Tailgate" received a mixed-to-positive reception from critics. The A.V. Club gave it a B+ grade, praising the Marshall storyline as an emotionally resonant continuation of the show's treatment of grief following the death of Marvin Eriksen Sr., while noting that the Puzzles subplot was "the funniest of the three stories" and comparing the bar's theme song to the opening of Cheers. IMDb users rated the episode 7.7 out of 10.

== Critical response ==
The A.V. Club graded the episode a B+.

IGN stated that since the main characters are separated into storylines that weren't connected, they lost character interaction, and so the show was not funny.
