= Last Forever =

- How I Met Your Mother episodes
- Ted finally meets the Mother
- Episode nos.: Season 9 Episodes 23 and 24
- Directed by: Pamela Fryman
- Written by: Carter Bays; Craig Thomas
- Original air date: March 31, 2014

Guest appearances
- Jim Nantz as himself; Judith Drake as Bernice; Lyndsy Fonseca as Penny (credited as Daughter); David Henrie as Luke (credited as Son)

Episode chronology
← Previous "The End of the Aisle"	Next → —
- How I Met Your Mother season 9

"Last Forever" is the two-part series finale of the American sitcom television series How I Met Your Mother. The 23rd and 24th episodes of the ninth season, and the 207th and 208th overall, they were written by series creators Carter Bays and Craig Thomas and directed by Pamela Fryman. The episodes originally aired in the United States on CBS on March 31, 2014, and were watched by 13.13 million viewers in the United States.

"Last Forever" received a negative response from television critics and fans of the show alike, primarily in regard to the final twist ending, the relationship between Ted Mosby (Josh Radnor) and Robin Scherbatsky (Cobie Smulders), and the fate of the series's titular mother. Many viewers expressed considerable disdain for the disregard for character development and said the episode rendered the entire ninth season pointless. Due to the backlash, an alternate ending was included in the ninth season's home media release.

== Plot ==
=== Part 1 ===
In May 2013, at Barney and Robin's wedding reception, Ted discusses his move to Chicago with Marshall and Lily. Barney recognizes the bass player as the woman who advised him to pursue Robin and tries to convince Ted to introduce himself, but Ted declines. After saying goodbye, he heads to Farhampton train station. There, an elderly lady spots the Mother nearby, but Ted decides not to approach her since he is moving in less than a day. The next night, Ted surprises Marshall and Lily at MacLaren's, revealing he met the bass player from the wedding and they hit it off.

In 2015, Ted, now engaged, discusses wedding plans with Robin and Barney at MacLaren's. Robin is busier than ever traveling due to her career, causing tension in her marriage with Barney. The Mother arrives, revealing they need to postpone the wedding because she is pregnant.

By May 2016, Ted and the Mother host a get-together where Barney and Robin announce their divorce. The mood lifts when Marshall and Lily reveal they are expecting their third child. They all vow to stay friends.

In October 2016, Marshall and Lily throw a Halloween party on the rooftop of the apartment before moving out. Robin, feeling outgrown and conflicted about her unresolved feelings for Ted, decides to leave, which upsets Lily.

=== Part 2 ===
In 2018, Barney heads to MacLaren's. Meanwhile, Marshall and Lily, now parents, plan an early night. Marshall announces he is replacing a retiring judge, sparking a celebration. Lily scolds Barney for reverting to his old womanizing self, but Barney insists that his failed marriage with Robin has made him realize he will never find the love of his life. Lily relents, letting Barney enjoy his night.

In 2019, Barney learns that one of his one-night stands is now pregnant with his child. Despite his misgivings, Barney immediately loves his newborn daughter, Ellie, and commits himself to fatherhood.

In 2020, Ted re-proposes to the Mother, setting their wedding for the next Thursday. At MacLaren's, Marshall announces he is running for New York Supreme Court. Robin shows up, having reconsidered after the Mother's encouragement. Lily toasts to Ted and the Mother's future.

In 2013, Ted gathers the courage to introduce himself to the bass player under her yellow umbrella. She reveals her name is Tracy McConnell and remembers him from his first day as a professor. Ted recognizes her umbrella as the one he left at Cindy's. They realize how often they have narrowly missed each other as the train arrives.

In 2030, Luke and Penny, Ted's children, realize his story is more about his feelings for Aunt Robin than meeting their mother, who died six years earlier. They give their blessing for him to pursue Robin. Ted visits her with the blue French horn from their first date, and they share a meaningful smile.

==== DVD alternative ending ====
At Ted's and the Mother's wedding, Barney and Robin nod to each other and smile as Future Ted's narration implies they later get back together. He then adds that he believes he is lucky to wake up next to the Mother every morning, and cannot help but be amazed at how "easy" it all really was, recalling his former relationships and expressing incredulity at how allowing Barney and Robin to fall in love led him to leave their wedding early and run into the Mother. After Ted meeting the Mother is shown, Future Ted narrates "See? Easy. And that, kids, is how I met your mother."

== Production ==
=== Writing ===
Before writing the episode, Carter Bays and Craig Thomas decided to watch the series finales of other sitcoms for inspiration. They said that they crafted the last ten minutes of the series right from the start. In February 2014, Bays tweeted that he found a rough draft of the series finale that he first wrote in 2006. In an interview with CNN, Thomas revealed that there was worry among the cast that the series was doomed to fail. He added that he felt that they had written a successful ending for the series^{.}

Before the airing of the series finale, debates raged among fans concerning the fate of Ted and the Mother, fueled by scenes from various episodes through the ninth season which seemed to foreshadow a tragic ending. Additionally the season 7 episode "Tailgate" featured a headstone reading "Mother", Screen Rant's Kara Hedash attributed this to being for The Mother.

=== Filming ===
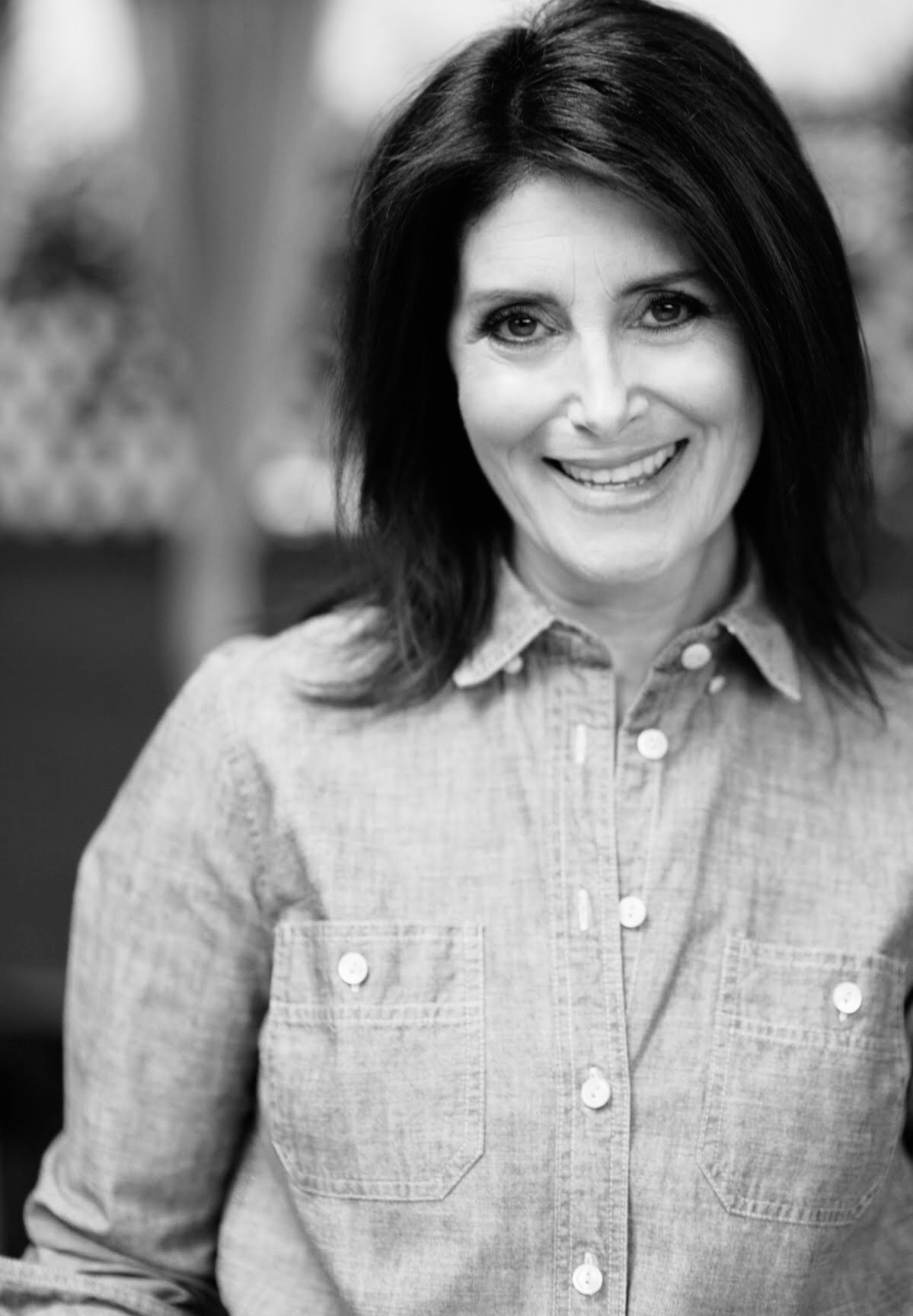
Pamela Fryman directed the episode.

According to tweets from Alyson Hannigan, approximately 18 minutes of the original episode had to be cut to fit the broadcast time. One cut sequence features Marshall paying Lily regarding a bet on whether Ted and Robin end up together, first referenced in the episode "No Pressure" (2012). Other cut scenes feature Robin, wearing her Robin Sparkles jeans jacket over her wedding dress, singing "Let's Go to the Mall" (2007) with the Mother's band at the wedding reception, as well as a montage showing Tracy's funeral.

The scene involving Ted's future children (Lyndsy Fonseca and David Henrie) was secretly shot in 2006 during the production of the second season. This was primarily done so the teenage characters would not age, since Fonseca and Henrie were adults by the time the final episode aired. The scene was filmed on a set closed to everyone except Bays, Thomas, executive producer/director Pamela Fryman, a camera operator, and Fonseca and Henrie, who signed non-disclosure agreements. Fonseca stated that she had forgotten the details of the scene in the years since its filming, while Henrie said, "I do remember. I think I remember. We'll see." Josh Radnor was also told some parts of the finale from the start, but neither he nor the rest of the cast were informed how the series would end.

An alternative cut of the ending appeared on the season nine DVD and the box set. It did not contain any new footage but is edited in a way that changes the fates of Tracy, Robin and Barney. The voiceover is performed by Saget, rather than Radnor, and is completely different.

=== Casting ===
"Last Forever" stars Josh Radnor, Cobie Smulders, Neil Patrick Harris, Jason Segel, Alyson Hannigan, and Cristin Milioti, as Ted Mosby, Robin Scherbatsky, Barney Stinson, Marshall Eriksen, Lily Aldrin, and The Mother.

Radnor, not Bob Saget, plays future Ted when he appears on camera. During a Reddit Ask Me Anything whether he should have played the role, Saget said that Radnor doing so "felt appropriate to me. It's not The Matrix where Ted CGI's into a narrator of his voice that was done as a sweet way to tell his story from almost his conscience from the future of his own life".

=== Music ===
Everything but the Girl's acoustic cover of the Tom Waits song "Downtown Train" was used in the scene where Ted and The Mother meet at the Farhampton train station. Music supervisor Andy Gowan says that Carter Bays "basically put it in the script, and wrote that script with that song in mind"; Gowan described the song as "heartbreakingly beautiful" and captured both the "sweet and romantic" and the "somber, dark part" of the scene.

"Heaven" by The Walkmen features in the final scene of "Last Forever". Gowan said that "it seemed like it was written for our show". Gowan had suggested the song before, especially for use in the season 8 premiere, and said that when he pitched it for use in the season 9 finale, "[the song] was just the one that resonated with all of us the most".

== Reception ==
=== Ratings ===
Both parts of "Last Forever" aired back-to-back on CBS on March 31, 2014. The episodes were watched by 13.13 million viewers in the United States in its original American broadcast and received a 5.4 rating/16% share among adults between the ages of 18 and 49. This marked a significant increase, of over four million viewers, in the ratings from the previous episode, "The End of the Aisle". It also ranks as the most-watched episode of the season, as well as the most-watched episode for the series, beating the season 1 episode "The Pineapple Incident", which was watched by 12.27 million viewers and received a 4.4 rating among adults ages 18–49. The episode also ranked first in its timeslot and second of the night as a whole.

=== Critical response ===
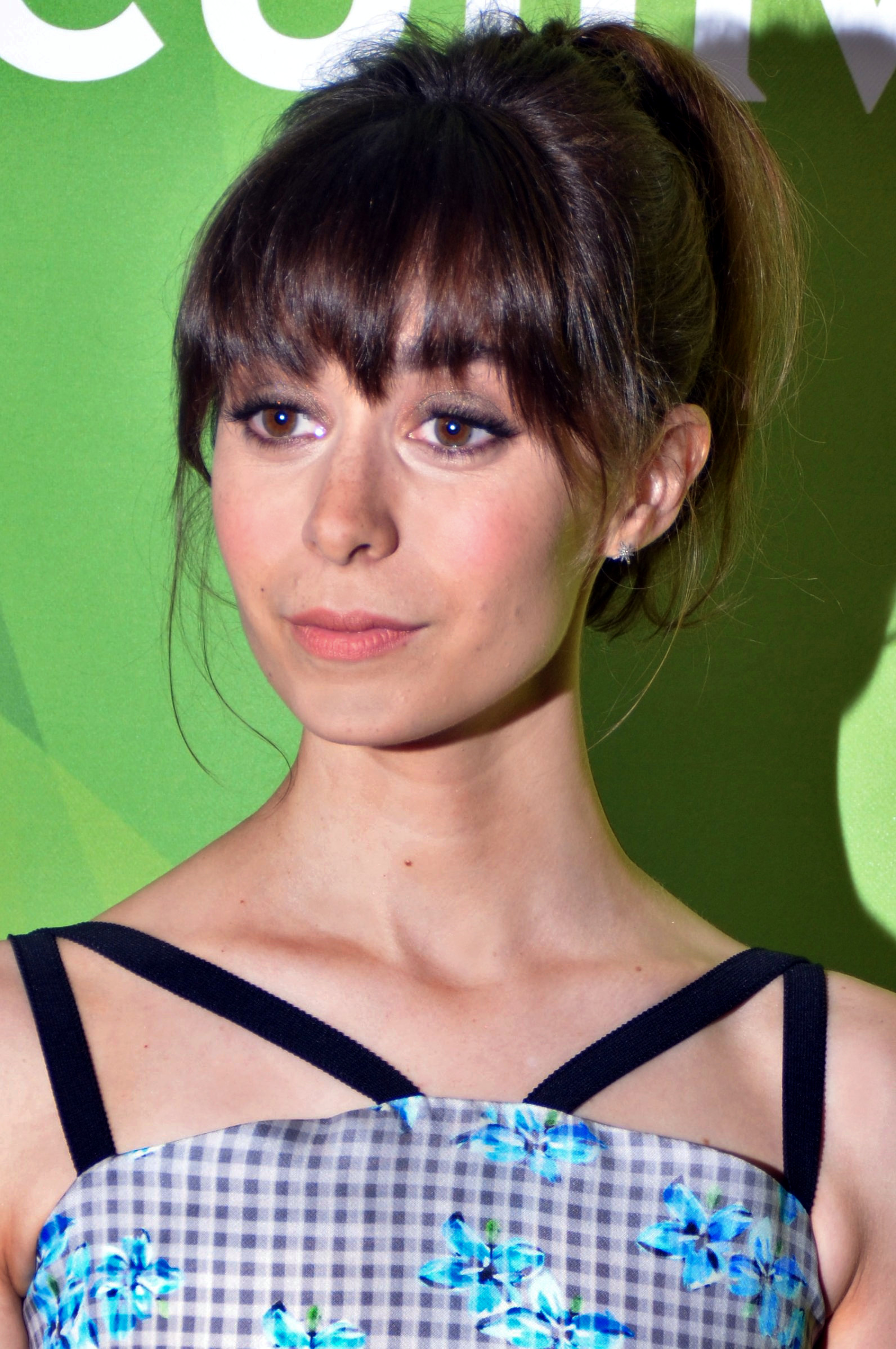
Cristin Milioti at NBCUniversal's 2014 Summer TCA Tour

"Last Forever" received an overwhelmingly negative response from critics and fans of the show alike. Many viewers expressed considerable dissatisfaction regarding the resolution of Ted's story, his relationship to Robin, and the fate of the titular mother. Additionally, the season-long buildup for Barney and Robin's wedding and their divorce 10 minutes into the next episode was criticized. Fans took to social media, such as Tumblr and Twitter, to express their disappointment. Some fans joked that the episode was an early April Fools' joke, because it aired on March 31.

Many critics noted how the finale disregarded the character development of Ted, Barney and Robin. The A.V. Club's Emily St. James felt that the episode, and the series as a whole, was poorly planned out and that it wasted the audience's time by investing them in Tracy. Alan Sepinwall of HitFix cited how the entire ninth season revolved around Barney and Robin's wedding and the chemistry between Harris and Smulders as a reason for the poor reception for the character's split. Sepinwall noted how pre-filming the ending limited the creative options for the series. Donna Bowman of The A.V. Club labeled Barney's character regression among the worst parts of the episode. She graded the episode a B+, calling the finale "a strange ride, marvelous in some ways, confounding in others. Endings are difficult, and I don't think any objective assessment would say they nailed this one."

Joyce Eng of TV Guide said that she'd have preferred Ted not to have ended up with Robin but believed that Carter Bays and Craig Thomas to be "romantics" with a desire to bring the plot back full-circle and reunite the Mother with Max, "her first true love". Though the Mother served as a "cheap plot device" to a degree, Eng said that "Ted's time with her also taught him nothing lasts forever, nothing's perfect. And he needs to move on with his life, but that doesn't make his relationship with The Mother any less important. I don't think the Ted of 2005 would've done the same."

Saim Cheeda from Screen Rant was critical of the nature of Mother's death. Cheeda felt that using the Mother's death as a framing device was one of the worst elements of the episode, stating that it was likely one of the main reasons why the finale was so poorly executed. The A.V. Club's St. James felt that handling of the death was more disappointing when compared with the unseen character Max's death in "How Your Mother Met Me" from earlier in season 9.

=== Legacy ===
As of June 2025, "Last Forever: Part Two" is the worst rated episode of the show on IMDb. Some fans of the show called on CBS to commission the creators of the show via a Change.org petition to rewrite and reshoot the finale. As of April 2, 2014, the petition had received more than 5,000 signatures. On April 5, 2014, Carter Bays announced on Twitter that an alternative ending, from the same filmed material, would be included on the season 9 DVD.

In the years succeeding its airing, it continued to be singled out as one of television's worst series finales. The episodes topped USA Today's 2018 list of "Worst Series Finales of All Time". Writing for Business Insider, Carrie Wittmer placed the episodes 10th on her 2018 list of the worst series finales. Wittmer felt it was worse than the Gossip Girl (2007–2012) finale "New York, I Love You XOXO" (2012) and the Roseanne (1988–1997) finale "Into That Good Night" (1997), but better than the Dexter (2006–2013) finale "Remember the Monsters?" (2013). She added that not only was the conclusion predictable, but it harmed the rewatchability of the series as a whole.

The cast had varying opinions of the finale, with Radnor and Hannigan criticizing it and Harris and Smulders praising it. Segel has stated that he has not viewed it. In a 2014 interview with David Letterman, Harris spoke about the ending:

Some people just hated it, and I think that that's a compliment to the show in a weird way because it means that they have grown up with these characters and feel like they wanted it to go a certain way, though I think it's great. But our show really did cross the line between funny funny and really serious, and that was kind of the balance that this show had. And as the show grew up, and as we grew up in the show, it ended in a more adult way and I think it was a nice, reflective, kind of sad, but happy ending to a long, long story.
