= Trilogy Time =

- How I Met Your Mother episode
- Episode no.: Season 7 Episode 20
- Directed by: Pamela Fryman
- Written by: Kourtney Kang
- Original air date: April 9, 2012

Guest appearances
- Becki Newton as Quinn; Michael Gladis as Chester; Meghan Maureen McDonough as Veronica; Gregory Michael as Trey

Episode chronology
| ← Previous "The Broath" | Next → "Now We're Even" |
- How I Met Your Mother (season 7)

"Trilogy Time" is the 20th episode of the seventh season of the CBS sitcom How I Met Your Mother, and the 156th episode overall. It aired on April 9, 2012.

== Plot ==
Quinn has thrown out most of her things in order to appease Barney's irrational fear of change, but Barney will not even let her keep her coffee mugs. Ted and Marshall suggest it would be a good time to sit down for another "trilogy time", in which they watch the original Star Wars trilogy and predict what their lives will be like in three years. The tradition started in 2000 when in college, Ted and Marshall chose to watch the entire trilogy instead of studying for their economics final (which they flunked) after Marshall stated that if one did not watch the trilogy through every three years, "the dark side wins".

Ted and Marshall begin to predict their futures three years at a time. Ted consistently imagines himself as a successful architect who has designed multiple skyscrapers and married to a woman who resembles Robin. Marshall imagines himself with a mustache, married to Lily, and a successful lawyer with a family of five children. Barney hopes to live his life the same way as he currently is, introducing the gang to a new girl he is sleeping with only to kick her out so that they will never see her again.

In 2012, Ted realizes after reflecting on the trilogy times of 2000, 2003, 2006, and 2009 that his friends are all moving on perfectly without him, and that there must be something wrong with him. He predicts a bleak future of himself in 2015 living alone while Marshall and Lily are happy with a large family and Robin has married someone else, with the only constant being Barney will always be looking for a new girl. Barney refutes Ted, stating that for the first time he wants to be with someone he knows three years later. He returns to his apartment, apologizes to Quinn, and christens his commitment to her by breaking some of his coffee mugs. He says that although they have not yet talked of their future, he wants her to know that he is hers for as long as she will have him. When both of them wind up farting in front of each other, something Barney had been doing outside for some time, drawing the attention, and later obsession, of a neighbor across the street, inadvertently destroying his marriage, Quinn happily says that they are at least a real couple.

Marshall comforts Ted, saying that "2015 will be different". In a flash forward to 2015, Marshall and Barney set up for another trilogy time. Though Barney complains that Ted is breaking their tradition by bringing a girl, he and Marshall make an exception because Ted really loves the girl, his infant daughter with the Mother.

== Production ==
In an interview, show co-creator Craig Thomas revealed that in the flash-forward to 2015 that Barney's left ring finger is intentionally not shown. He called it, "One of those little moments where you realize what a good actor Neil Patrick Harris is because he can somehow make hiding his left hand seem perfectly natural."

== Reception ==
The A.V. Club's Donna Bowman graded the episode a B+, stating that it had the show's "classic trope of flash-forwards and backs", mixed with fantasy predictions.

Chris O'Hara of TV Fanatic gave the episode a perfect score (5.0).

Michelle Profis of Entertainment Weekly said the episode's final scene opened potential for further material late in the series.

The episode has a 8.5/10 rating on IMDB from over four thousand reviews.
