= Noretta =

- How I Met Your Mother episode
- Episode no.: Season 7 Episode 7
- Directed by: Pamela Fryman
- Written by: Matt Kuhn
- Production code: 7ALH07
- Original air date: October 24, 2011

Guest appearances
- Kal Penn as Kevin; Nazanin Boniadi as Nora; Bill Fagerbakke as Marvin Eriksen Sr.; Chris Elliott as Mickey Aldrin; Wayne Brady as James Stinson; Frances Conroy as Loretta Stinson; Cristine Rose as Virginia Mosby; "Weird Al" Yankovic as himself

Episode chronology
← Previous "Mystery vs. History"	Next → "The Slutty Pumpkin Returns"
- How I Met Your Mother (season 7)

"Noretta" is the seventh episode of the seventh season of the CBS sitcom How I Met Your Mother and the 143rd episode overall. It aired on October 24, 2011. The gang realise that their partners bear some resemblance to their parents. Meanwhile, Barney and Nora's romantic evening is ruined by a string of disasters.

== Plot ==
Barney's brother, James, visits before Barney and Nora leave for a date with plans to consummate their relationship. James thinks Nora is too much like their mother, Loretta. Kevin, a therapist, comments that it is natural to like people who remind them of their parents. During the date, a series of mishaps nearly dissuade Barney from sleeping with Nora. He manages to turn all the incidents around, although he is unsettled when he sees the similarities between Nora and his mother.

Marshall accidentally insults Lily when she admits to feeling unattractive as her body begins to swell from pregnancy. To show her how beautiful she is, Marshall makes up a board game. However, the plan backfires when Lily recalls Kevin's words about how it is natural to like someone who resembles one's parents; Lily remembers that her father also loved to create absurd board games. When she admits to being uncomfortable around Marshall because she keeps imagining her father, Marshall winds up seeing familiar traits of his father in Lily. They cancel their romantic plans for the evening.

Ted admits to Robin that he is uncomfortable with Kevin after seeing Kevin standing in the apartment in his boxers. When Kevin tells Robin that the incident because he had just spilled coffee on his pants after seeing Ted walk by half-naked, he admits that he feels uncomfortable with how close Robin and Ted are considering their history. Robin assures him that there is nothing between her and Ted and that Ted is insecure about being alone. When Robin and Kevin's evening together in the apartment is interrupted by Ted, Kevin goes along with Robin's insistence on comforting Ted. He becomes upset when Ted invites Robin to a "Weird Al" Yankovic concert until Ted openly admits to feeling lonely and the sole reason he invited Robin was because he had already exhausted all his other friends and acquaintances. Kevin pretends to be a "Weird Al" fan and agrees to go the concert.

At the bar, Ted claims that he had suggested to "Weird Al" the lyrics for "Like a Surgeon". Barney returns and tells everyone he slept with Nora anyway by "turning her around", and remarks that her resemblance to his mother makes her more special to him since his mother is the best person he knows. This perspective causes Marshall and Lily to look more positively on the common traits they share with each other's parents. Kevin and Robin go to the apartment, leaving Ted alone, where he meets a "Weird Al" fan who resembles his mother. In the tag scene, "Weird Al" gets a fan letter from Ted in 1985 which gives him the inspiration for "Like a Surgeon".

== Reception ==
Donna Bowman of the A.V. Club gave the episode a B.
