= Mystery vs. History =

- How I Met Your Mother episode
- Episode no.: Season 7 Episode 6
- Directed by: Pamela Fryman
- Written by: Chuck Tatham
- Production code: 7ALH05
- Original air date: October 17, 2011

Guest appearances
- Kal Penn as Kevin; Ray Wise as Robin Sr.; Amber Stevens West as Janet; Eleanor Seigler as Mia; Rachel Sterling as Paula

Episode chronology
| ← Previous "Field Trip" | Next → "Noretta" |
- How I Met Your Mother (season 7)

"Mystery vs. History" is the sixth episode of the seventh season of the CBS sitcom How I Met Your Mother and the 142nd episode overall. It aired on October 17, 2011.

== Plot ==
When Ted decides to date a woman named Janet MacIntyre without researching her, Barney and Robin attempt to intervene by researching Janet for him, which he insists that they do not. Ted explains to Kevin that Robin and Barney have researched many of the women he dated in the past and ruined the relationships by revealing unappealing background information on them. Before his date with Janet, he makes a deal with her that they will not research each other on the Internet, which she agrees to.

In the meantime, Marshall and Lily recruit Barney, Robin, and Kevin to help paint the room for their baby. Though they have obtained the information on the sex of their baby, they choose not to open the envelope containing the information so that the baby's sex will be a surprise when it is born. Barney disagrees with their decision and tries to convince them to open the envelope, arguing that there are advantages to knowing what the child's sex will be. When everyone begins arguing about whether "mystery" is better, Kevin breaks and calls them out on their meddling, dysfunctional, and violent behavior. He admits that while he did not want to analyze them, he has noticed that everyone in their group is unreasonably close and have been meddling too much in each other's lives. While Kevin's assessment appears to be true, it causes a rift between him and Robin, which he attempts to make up for by offering to paint the rest of the room by himself.

During the painting session, Barney and Robin have insisted on continuing their research on Janet for Ted. Through their research, they learn a number of startling things about Janet which they attempt to share with Ted. Marshall eventually allows Barney to learn the sex of the baby if he does not tell him and Lily, but Barney eventually convinces them to look, only to rip the card in half and refuse to give the half with the information back to Lily and Marshall. Barney agrees to give it to them if they look at what he and Robin have learned about Janet. When Marshall gets the card, he and Lily are unable to firmly decide if they want to know, and Marshall ends up throwing the card out the window for the sake of "mystery".

Meanwhile, Ted is having trouble conversing with Janet without the use of the Internet during their date. Despite initial attempts to resist everyone's insistence that he should look her up on the Internet, he gives in and learns that she is extremely accomplished, highly altruistic, and very wealthy. Ted becomes nervous and Janet leaves him, recognizing that his sudden change in behavior means that he has learned about all her achievements and he has become intimidated, as has happened with all her previous dating encounters. After he rejoins his friends, Ted tells them that he regrets giving in and that he would rather have "mystery" over "history" for his future dates. When Ted puts his foot up on a stool, Marshall notices that the card he threw out the window had stuck to Ted's shoe; he and Lily learn that their baby will be a boy.

== Reception ==
Donna Bowman of the A.V. Club gave the episode a B+. Chris O'Hara of TV Fanatic gave the episode 4 out of 5 stars.

Robert Canning of IGN gave the episode 6.5, criticizing the writing and acting of the cast and crew. Mentioning such instances as that "Kal Penn's line delivery feels very sitcom-y, and I don't know if we should blame him or the writing. Or both.", and that "Kevin stands out like a sore thumb".
