= 46 Minutes =

- How I Met Your Mother episode
- Episode no.: Season 7 Episode 14
- Directed by: Pamela Fryman
- Written by: Dan Gregor; Doug Mand
- Production code: 7ALH14
- Original air date: January 16, 2012

Guest appearances
- Chris Elliott as Mickey; Dimitri Diatchenko as Aryvdas; Kal Penn as Kevin; Milynn Sarley as Ferrari; Ptolemy Slocum as Larry; Matt Lasky as Butterfly Knife

Episode chronology
← Previous "Tailgate"	Next → "The Burning Beekeeper"
- How I Met Your Mother (season 7)

"46 Minutes" is the 14th episode of the seventh season of the CBS sitcom How I Met Your Mother, and the 150th episode overall. It aired on January 16, 2012. In this episode, Marshall and Lily adjust to their new suburban home and struggle with having Mickey around. Meanwhile, the rest of the gang copes with the distance caused by Marshall and Lily's move to the suburbs.

== Plot ==
Marshall and Lily officially move to the suburbs, where they find Lily's dad Mickey unwilling to move out. After putting up with him for two weeks, Marshall finally tells Mickey to move out. When the power goes out, a hurt Mickey decides to play tricks on Marshall and attempts to prevent him from successfully reaching the basement where the fuse box is located. When Marshall trips down the basement stairs, Lily convinces Mickey to instruct Marshall, via intercom, how to reach the fuse box. He does so, and Marshall is able to restore the power.

Meanwhile, Ted finds himself missing Marshall and Lily, while Barney imposes himself as the group's new leader. The remaining gang, now including Kevin, are forced go to a strip club by Barney, where they encounter Lily's stripper doppelgänger (Alyson Hannigan) again. Barney tries to make Stripper Lily and her boyfriend Aryvdas fit into the group as a new Lily and Marshall. As the night progresses, Robin and Kevin play "New Relationship Chicken" (where they always say 'yes' to things to seem more interesting) until they admit they do not like it, and Ted becomes increasingly inebriated and sad. After a poker game, Stripper Lily and Aryvdas steal $200 from each of the gang, convincing them to go back to Marshall and Lily.

On Long Island, Ted tells Marshall and Lily that he misses them, and they all sit down for breakfast. Lily tells her father that he can stay for a little longer, to which he replies that he will be staying "two weeks max", although Future Ted states that he stayed for much longer. Future Ted then says that even though they all eventually moved away from their booth at MacLaren's, their "booth" was wherever they all were.

In the tag scene, Mickey watches "The Widow Rodriguez" work out, only to run off screaming for 911 when she appears to have a heart attack.

== Critical response ==
Donna Bowman of the A.V. Club graded the episode a B. Robert Canning of IGN gave a score of 8.5 saying that "Though the episode was light and silly, with its new openings and horror movie camera work, things ended with a soft, human, How I Met Your Mother touch."

Adam Vitcavage of Paste called it a funny filler episode which doesn't go anywhere fast.
