= The Burning Beekeeper =

- How I Met Your Mother episode
- Episode no.: Season 7 Episode 15
- Directed by: Pamela Fryman
- Written by: Carter Bays; Craig Thomas
- Production code: 7ALH17
- Original air date: February 6, 2012

Guest appearances
- Martin Short as Garrison Cootes; Chris Elliott as Mickey Aldrin; Rebecca Creskoff as Geraldine

Episode chronology
| ← Previous "46 Minutes" | Next → "The Drunk Train" |
- How I Met Your Mother (season 7)

"The Burning Beekeeper" is the 15th episode of the seventh season of the CBS sitcom How I Met Your Mother, and the 151st episode overall. It aired on February 6, 2012. The story of "The Burning Beekeeper" unfolds room by room at Lily and Marshall's housewarming party, mostly a bottle episode.

== Plot ==
In the cold opening, Marshall and Lily discuss their upcoming housewarming party with Lily's father, Mickey, imploring him not to ruin the night. However, during the conversation, Mickey mentions that he has been keeping bees in the basement as part of a recent business venture, much to the couple's dismay. On the night of the party, Ted and Robin arrive in the midst of an argument, which they put on hold as they enter the house. Future Ted explains to his kids that the housewarming party fell apart in five minutes. He proceeds to describe those five minutes, going room by room.

In the living room, Lily stresses about how the party is going despite Marshall's reassurance until his boss Garrison Cootes informs him that they need to go back to work. Lily suggests that Cootes have some vegan spring rolls and he departs for the dining room, only to return and confront Ted about the supply of vegan food having already been eaten. Cootes, being a vegan, is angry because he thinks that Ted has eaten the spring rolls, nearly coming to blows with an unusually aggressive Ted before Lily steps in and advises Cootes of other possible food options. He then goes back to the dining room. Meanwhile, a distraught Barney confides in Robin about an issue that is unknown at the moment. Marshall enters with a block of gouda cheese, which Lily quickly destroys. She then sits down, convinced that her party has been a disaster, but Robin manages to convince her otherwise. Moments later, a man in a beekeeper outfit runs through the house on fire.

In the dining room, Barney has eaten all the spring rolls as he converses with a woman he deems is crazy until he sees that she is attractive. He then seduces her and she tells him to meet her in the upstairs guest bedroom to engage in sex. After she departs, Cootes arrives and Barney blames Ted for the missing spring rolls, enraging Cootes who then goes into the living room to confront Ted. Having witnessed the conversation between Barney and the attractive woman, Lily demands that Barney talk to her privately in the kitchen. Marshall then asks Robin for help in confronting Cootes, during which Robin struggles to prove she can maintain her composure over small issues that normally enrage her. Soon afterward, Lily and Barney both leave the kitchen upset and enter the living room. Cootes re-enters the dining room, where Marshall asks to speak with him privately in the kitchen. Eventually, he comes back into the dining room, where Mickey tells him he threw a good party. Again, the scene ends with a man in a beekeeper outfit running through the house on fire.

In the kitchen, Ted and Robin continue their argument after putting the food they brought to the party in the oven and setting a five-minute timer. They argue over Robin's tendency to start arguments with strangers at the slightest provocation and Ted's tendency to run from confrontation, explaining their weird behaviour in the house. Unable to come to a resolution, they eventually disperse into the party before Lily and Barney enter the kitchen. Lily informs Barney of the attractive woman, her neighbor Geraldine, and her history involving previous lovers: the last man to have slept with Geraldine and not call afterward was hunted down and had a "certain part of his anatomy removed". As she warns him again not to have sex with Geraldine, the gouda cheese that Marshall served in the previous scene is accidentally knocked to the floor and almost immediately covered in mice. A shocked Lily flees in alarm, followed by Barney soon after he replaces the cheese on the kitchen counter.

Marshall and Cootes then enter the kitchen, where Marshall reveals that the recent long hours at the office have resulted in the neglect of his pregnant wife. He requests a night off to relax with family and friends, to which Cootes refuses. Marshall quits out of desperation, telling Cootes he needs to relax and find a hobby if he does not want to work himself to death, then leaves to serve the cheese. Realizing Marshall may have been right, Cootes, at the advice of Mickey, decides to don the beekeeper's outfit in an attempt to take up a hobby. However, based on Barney's apocryphal advice moments earlier, Mickey has doused the suit in kerosene to repel the bees. As Cootes begins to enter the basement, the five minute timer for Robin and Ted's dish goes off on the oven. Unaware of the danger, he opens the oven door and immediately bursts into flames. After a frantic run through the house, Cootes leaps into the snow-covered front yard to extinguish the blaze. Exhilarated at the feeling of being alive, he tells Marshall that they will take the night off. He then asks if he will see Marshall on Monday, to which Marshall replies in the affirmative. When Marshall attempts to re-enter the house, he realizes that Cootes has inadvertently allowed the bees to escape their basement enclosure.

Meanwhile, Barney and Geraldine have been upstairs having sex, oblivious to the action occurring in the rest of the house. Barney tries to sneak out when she begins describing their future. He sees the escaped bees in the hallway and hesitates before slinking off into the hallway, screaming at the insect stings.

== Production ==
When asked in 2014 "What is the episode you regret the most? why?", show co-creator Carter Bays stated

I wish we'd had an extra week of writing, an extra week of shooting, and an extra week of editing for "the Burning Beekeeper." It was a science project that we just ran out of time on. I want to turn it into a movie someday, just to get another crack at it.

== Critical response ==
The A.V. Club graded the episode a C+ and called it a "misfire".

TV Fanatic gave the episode 5 out of 5 stars.

Ethan Alter from Television Without Pity gave the episode a C and said that "for all the energy on display there weren't a lot of laughs".

Paste Magazine's Adam Vitcavage also criticized the episode for being "complicated and mushy". It had 9.98 million viewers and was second in its time slot behind The Voice on NBC.
