= The Slutty Pumpkin Returns =

- How I Met Your Mother episode
- Episode no.: Season 7 Episode 8
- Directed by: Pamela Fryman
- Written by: Tami Sagher
- Original air date: October 31, 2011

Guest appearances
- Katie Holmes as Naomi; Christina Pickles as Rita / Lily's Grandmother

Episode chronology
← Previous "Noretta"	Next → "Disaster Averted"
- How I Met Your Mother (season 7)

"The Slutty Pumpkin Returns" is the eighth episode of the seventh season of the CBS sitcom How I Met Your Mother, and the 144th episode overall. It originally aired on October 31, 2011. It is a follow-up episode that references the events of the sixth episode of the first season titled "The Slutty Pumpkin" which aired on October 24, 2005.

== Plot ==
Future Ted reminds his kids that ten years earlier he met the Slutty Pumpkin during the rooftop Halloween party, but lost the Kit Kat on which she had written her number and waited each year for her to appear again.

In October 2011, Ted sees the slutty pumpkin costume in the window of a shop, where the owner divulges the identity of the woman who rented it in 2001. Ted meets Naomi, the girl who wore the costume; she has also been searching for him, and they start dating. Ted realizes they have no chemistry and that he has no feelings for her, but he cannot bring himself to end the relationship so quickly after finally finding her. When Ted decides that he needs to break up with Naomi, he is stunned to see her wear the slutty pumpkin costume; he says that he loves her and they have sex. They arrive at the Halloween party on the roof wearing the costumes they wore when they first met. After Naomi consumes a Tootsie Roll cocktail, she confesses that she found their relationship as awkward as Ted did, but felt similarly resistant to ending it. They break up amicably.

Lily's judgement is impaired by the fact that she has "pregnancy brain", and impulsively decides she wants to live in the suburbs after she and Marshall are given her grandparents' house. Though Marshall wants to live in the suburbs, he does not want to take advantage of Lily's state of mind. Lily tries to trick Marshall into giving in due to the wholesomeness of the trick-or-treaters. When Lily realizes how her pregnancy brain has affected her ability to make decisions, evidenced by giving the trick-or-treaters a stapler, scissors, and a bottle of Pinot Noir instead of candy, resulting in the door being egged, she agrees to wait until she can think clearly before she and Marshall decide whether they want to move.

Robin learns from Barney's father Jerome Whittaker that Barney's paternal grandmother was born in Manitoba, thus making Barney one-quarter Canadian. Barney is horrified and Robin teases him as revenge for all the mockery she endured from him due to his disdain for the country. She agrees to stop if Barney wears a Mountie costume for the Halloween party on the roof, but Barney resists and winds up wearing an American-themed boxing outfit. Robin points out that Barney is not uncomfortable on the cold rooftop in his shirtless costume, due to his Canadian ancestry. When he returns home later, a fantasy sequence ensues in which his Canadian side manifests physically and Barney futilely tries to beat him up; the Canadian version of Barney is unfailingly polite, friendly and unharmed throughout the attack.

== Critical response ==
Donna Bowman of The A.V. Club graded the episode a B, praising Katie Holmes in particular for exceeding low expectations. Robert Canning of IGN claimed that "it's that character familiarity that made 'The Slutty Pumpkin Returns' work so well".

The episode attracted 10.49 million viewers.
