= How I Met Your Mother season 7 =

How I Met Your Mother
- Season 7
- The Complete Season 7. The Ducky Tie Edition
- Starring: Josh Radnor; Jason Segel; Cobie Smulders; Neil Patrick Harris; Alyson Hannigan
- No. of episodes: 24

Release
- Original network: CBS
- Original release: September 19, 2011 – May 14, 2012

Season chronology
- ← Previous; Season 6 Next → Season 8

The seventh season of the American television comedy series How I Met Your Mother was announced in March 2011, along with confirmation of an eighth season. The seventh season premiered on CBS on September 19, 2011, with two episodes airing back to back, and concluded on May 14, 2012.

== Cast ==
=== Main cast ===
- Josh Radnor as Ted Mosby
- Jason Segel as Marshall Eriksen
- Cobie Smulders as Robin Scherbatsky
- Neil Patrick Harris as Barney Stinson
- Alyson Hannigan as Lily Aldrin
- Bob Saget (uncredited) as future Ted Mosby (voice only)

=== Recurring cast ===
- Kal Penn as Kevin
- Lyndsy Fonseca as Penny, Ted's Daughter
- David Henrie as Luke, Ted's Son
- Becki Newton as Quinn Garvey
- Nazanin Boniadi as Nora
- Chris Elliott as Mickey Aldrin, Lily's father
- Ellen D. Williams as Patrice
- Ashley Williams as Victoria
- Alexis Denisof as Sandy Rivers
- Vicki Lewis as Dr. Sonya
- Martin Short as Garrison Cootes, Marshall's boss
- Frances Conroy as Loretta Stinson
- Wayne Brady as James Stinson
- Bill Fagerbakke as Marvin Eriksen Sr.
- Ray Wise as Robin Scherbatsky Sr., Robin's father
- Suzie Plakson as Judy Eriksen
- Cristine Rose as Virginia Mosby
- Joe Nieves as Carl
- Chris Romano as Punchy
- Marshall Manesh as Ranjit

=== Guest cast ===
- Jimmi Simpson as Pete Durkenson
- Jeff Probst as himself
- "Weird Al" Yankovic as himself
- Katie Holmes as Naomi/Slutty Pumpkin
- Christina Pickles as Lily's grandmother
- Teresa Castillo as Maya
- Jerry Minor as King Charles
- Ernie Hudson as himself
- Will Sasso as Doug Martin
- Lindsey Morgan as Lauren
- Rachel Bloom as Wanda
- Conan O'Brien as a background bar patron (uncredited)
- Francesca Capaldi as Young Lily
- Rob Huebel as Mr. Flanagan

== Ratings ==
As of December 21, 2011, the 7th season was averaging a 5.3 rating / 14% share among adults 18–49, ranking as the 5th highest rated comedy series among adults 18–49.

On April 8, 2012, the New York Times stated that the 7th season ratings had reached a series high, marking a 20% increase in ratings among adults 18–49.

== Reception ==
Season seven of How I Met Your Mother received mixed reviews from critics. Alan Sepinwall gave the season a mixed review and criticized the flash-forwards throughout the season saying, "the show is just much, much stronger when its stories dwell on matters of the present or the past, and where the writers don't have to act like magicians trying to keep the audience from figuring out how the trick works. And the finale affirmed that belief for me. The parts that had little or nothing to do with things to come were quite good; the parts that were all about the future made me roll my eyes and ask, for the umpteenth time: 'Really? This is where you're going with this?'". Ethan Alter, of Television Without Pity, gave the season a lukewarm response. In his review of the season finale, he criticized the Robin-Barney storyline throughout the season, writing "So after an entire season, we're basically right back where we started, with the writers having taken 24 episodes to stage a reveal that could have happened in the first five minutes of the premiere and had the exact same impact."

== Episodes ==
Season seven episodes
No. overall	No. in season	Title	Directed by	Written by	Original release date	Prod. code	US viewers (millions)
137	1	"The Best Man"	Pamela Fryman	Carter Bays & Craig Thomas	September 19, 2011	7ALH01	11.00
While Barney prepares for his wedding, he and Ted reminisce about Punchy's wedding, which was ruined due to Marshall's drunk antics. Robin considers telling Barney she has feelings for him until Barney receives a call from Nora.
138	2	"The Naked Truth"	Pamela Fryman	Stephen Lloyd	September 19, 2011	7ALH02	12.22
Marshall finally lands his dream job, but he worries that his new employer would rescind the offer because of some past videos showing him as a streaker – Beercules. Meanwhile, Ted is at a loss over whom to take to the Architects' Ball while Barney tries to convince Nora that he can be trustworthy.
139	3	"Ducky Tie"	Rob Greenberg	Carter Bays & Craig Thomas	September 26, 2011	7ALH03	10.50
Ted runs into his old girlfriend, Victoria, and tries to make amends with her since he cheated during their relationship. She reveals she's engaged to a man she met in Germany. Marshall and Lily make a bet with Barney that could force him to wear Marshall's ducky tie.
140	4	"The Stinson Missile Crisis"	Pamela Fryman	Kourtney Kang	October 3, 2011	7ALH04	10.39
Robin is forced to undergo court-mandated therapy sessions after she assaults a girl who is out to ruin Barney's relationship with Nora. Robin becomes attracted to her therapist, Kevin (Kal Penn). Ted gets too involved in Lily's pregnancy.
141	5	"Field Trip"	Pamela Fryman	Jamie Rhonheimer	October 10, 2011	7ALH06	8.89
Ted takes his class on a field trip and Barney tags along. Meanwhile, Marshall takes matters into his own hands when his boss treads too carefully in making a huge settlement with a major company.
142	6	"Mystery vs. History"	Pamela Fryman	Chuck Tatham	October 17, 2011	7ALH05	9.81
The gang intervenes in Ted's business when he refuses to gather information online about a woman he is going to date with disastrous consequences. Meanwhile, Marshall and Lily decide not to find out the sex of their baby, but Barney soon tempts them to change their minds while setting up the baby's room. Kevin, Robin's boyfriend, paints the baby's bedroom.
143	7	"Noretta"	Pamela Fryman	Matt Kuhn	October 24, 2011	7ALH07	9.87
Kevin helps the gang realize that their partners remind them of one of their parents, depressing and embarrassing Marshall and Lily. Meanwhile, Barney and Nora's planned romantic evening is ruined by a string of horrible events.
144	8	"The Slutty Pumpkin Returns"	Pamela Fryman	Tami Sagher	October 31, 2011	7ALH08	10.49
Ted runs into "The Slutty Pumpkin" (Katie Holmes) but realizes that she is not "The One" and actually has nothing in common with him. Barney learns he is part Canadian, to his dismay and Robin's joy, and Lily has pregnancy brain.
145	9	"Disaster Averted"	Michael Shea	Robia Rashid	November 7, 2011	7ALH09	10.28
While the gang reminisces about Hurricane Irene, Barney tries to cut a deal with Marshall and Lily to get out of wearing the Ducky Tie.
146	10	"Tick, Tick, Tick"	Pamela Fryman	Chris Harris	November 14, 2011	7ALH10	10.42
Barney and Robin hide a deep secret from their partners. Ted, Lily and Marshall attend a concert.
147	11	"The Rebound Girl"	Pamela Fryman	Carter Bays & Craig Thomas	November 21, 2011	7ALH11	10.01
On Thanksgiving, Ted and Barney talk about a potential life-changing decision together by adopting a baby. Barney then steals a baby who turns out to be his brother's new baby girl. Robin tries to discourage Marshall and Lily from moving to Long Island to start their new life as a family. Robin reveals a shocking secret to Barney concerning their night together.
148	12	"Symphony of Illumination"	Pamela Fryman	Joe Kelly	December 5, 2011	7ALH12	11.51
Robin receives bad news and decides to hide it from the gang. Marshall is trapped on the roof of his house in the suburbs and is blackmailed by a teenager to stay there.
149	13	"Tailgate"	Pamela Fryman	Carter Bays & Craig Thomas	January 2, 2012	7ALH13	10.14
Marshall visits his father's grave to continue an old family tradition. Barney and Ted open a new bar and Robin's career takes a more positive turn.
150	14	"46 Minutes"	Pamela Fryman	Dan Gregor & Doug Mand	January 16, 2012	7ALH14	10.08
Marshall and Lily move to Long Island and her father won't stop tormenting them about their house. Barney declares himself "New Leader of the Gang" now that Lily is not present to boss Barney around. The new and 'improved' gang embrace the 'new Lily and Marshall' (Lily's stripper doppelgänger and her boyfriend) with bad consequences.
151	15	"The Burning Beekeeper"	Pamela Fryman	Carter Bays & Craig Thomas	February 6, 2012	7ALH17	9.98
Lily and Marshall throw a housewarming party, where various things go awry.
152	16	"The Drunk Train"	Pamela Fryman	Craig Gerard & Matthew Zinman	February 13, 2012	7ALH16	9.01
Lily and Marshall invite Robin and Kevin on a Valentine's Day trip to Vermont. Lily and Marshall worry about scores concerning the pregnancy. Kevin and Robin use the trip to talk about taking their relationship to the next level. Robin admits to Kevin that she can't have children and he proposes. Meanwhile, Barney realizes he has finally met his match.
153	17	"No Pressure"	Pamela Fryman	George Sloan	February 20, 2012	7ALH15	9.68
After Kevin breaks up with Robin, Ted confesses his feelings to her. Barney finds something private in Marshall and Lily's things. Marshall says something to Robin that he feels Ted loves her too much to say. Special appearance by Conan O'Brien as a background extra in MacLaren's.
154	18	"Karma"	Pamela Fryman	Stephen Lloyd	February 27, 2012	7ALH18	9.07
Barney tries to convince Quinn, aka Karma the stripper (Becki Newton), to go out with him. Ted wonders what to do with the room now vacated by Robin, who has moved out to the suburbs with help from Marshall and Lily.
155	19	"The Broath"	Pamela Fryman	Carter Bays & Craig Thomas	March 19, 2012	7ALH19	8.15
Barney and Quinn want to move in together, but Barney's friends do not like or trust Quinn and try to break them up. Robin and Ted fight over who deserves to sublet Quinn's apartment.
156	20	"Trilogy Time"	Pamela Fryman	Kourtney Kang	April 9, 2012	7ALH23	8.00
Ted, Marshall and Barney watch the original Star Wars trilogy and suddenly think about their lives three years into the future.
157	21	"Now We're Even"	Pamela Fryman	Chuck Tatham	April 16, 2012	7ALH22	7.24
Although Ted is happy with living alone at his new apartment, Barney tries to convince him about going out every night, attempting to distract himself from the disturbing thoughts of what Quinn would be doing at that moment. Lily has a naughty dream, but Marshall is not in it. Robin finally starts her stint as a news anchor at World Wide News.
158	22	"Good Crazy"	Pamela Fryman	Carter Bays & Craig Thomas	April 30, 2012	7ALH20	7.99
Marshall panics when a baby shower indicates that the birth is close at hand and is taken on a road trip by Barney to Atlantic City where he gets completely and utterly drunk. Ted hallucinates seeing Robin while trying to get over her and decides to patch up their differences. Barney tries to talk Quinn out of being a stripper. Lily goes into labor.
159	23	"The Magician's Code"	Pamela Fryman	Jennifer Hendriks	May 14, 2012	7ALH21	8.58
160	24	"The Magician's Code"	Pamela Fryman	Carter Bays & Craig Thomas	May 14, 2012	7ALH24	8.58
Marshall and Barney are still in Atlantic City when Lily goes into labor. In order to get back to Manhattan in time for the birth, Marshall must do a deal with the devil — Barney. While waiting for them to get back to the city, Ted and Robin try to keep Lily's mind occupied with stories. Ted realizes that he has a history of bad relationships with every girl he has dated except for Victoria and makes it a plan to contact her. Ted is conflicted when Victoria meets up with him on her wedding day and asks him to run away with her. Lily and Marshall have Robin take pictures of the baby's first day. Meanwhile, Barney and Quinn are arrested by airport security while on the way to Hawaii when Barney refuses to open a box they are traveling with. On Barney's future wedding day, his bride is finally revealed.

== DVD release ==
How I Met Your Mother – Season Seven – The Ducky Tie Edition
Set Details	Special Features
Three discs; 523 minutes; Anamorphic widescreen format; English 5.1 Dolby Digital audio; English, French and Spanish subtitle options	Neil Patrick Harris' Hollywood Walk of Fame Tribute; Audio Commentary on "The Best Man" episode; Audio Commentary on "The Drunk Train" episode; Audio Commentary on "Karma" episode; Deleted Scenes; Guest Star Powers; How We Wrote Your Mother; How We Make Your Mother; Gag Reel
Release Dates
Region 1
October 2, 2012
