= The Possimpible =

- How I Met Your Mother episode
- Episode no.: Season 4 Episode 14
- Directed by: Pamela Fryman
- Written by: Jonathan Groff
- Production code: 4ALH14
- Original air date: February 2, 2009

Episode chronology
← Previous "Three Days of Snow"	Next → "The Stinsons"
- How I Met Your Mother season 4

The Possimpible is the 14th episode in the fourth season of the television series How I Met Your Mother and the 78th episode overall. It was written by Jonathan Groff, directed by Pamela Fryman, and originally aired on February 2, 2009.

In the episode, Robin faces deportation after receiving notice from Immigration that she must find a job within seven days. Meanwhile, Barney creates a video résumé filled with buzzwords, and Ted, Marshall, and Lily reflect on the questionable entries on their own résumés. The episode received positive reviews, with critics highlighting its depiction of Barney's growing feelings for Robin.

== Plot ==
Robin finds a work permit notice from Immigration stating that if she does not get a job in the next seven days, she will be deported back to Canada. She first tries for a position on the News 10 channel but fails since she has no catch phrase to end her broadcast and simply strings together weird phrases (finishing with "wear a condom").

After Ted laughs at Marshall's basketball record listed on his resume, Marshall defends himself by mentioning a medical condition he has that prevents him from playing. It is later revealed that the condition is actually "dancer's hip", a malady common among ballet dancers. The gang jokes about it, much to Marshall's dismay, but he later admits to Lily that he does dance "more than you know". Barney shows his "awesome video résumé"; after seeing it, Robin requests to have one made.

Robin notices that Barney's video resume uses meaningless buzz words, such as "the Possimpible" to describe the nexus between the Possible and the Impossible. She does not agree with his method of getting a new job (including breaking 15 bricks with her forehead and wearing an Amazon warrior outfit). Her last remaining choice is the Lottery girl job. After Robin is turned down from that job, Ted, Marshall, and Lily are there for her in her last hours in the US. Barney finishes Robin's video résumé without her and it gets her a job at channel 12 hosting a new morning show.

Meanwhile, Ted, Marshall, and Lily reflect on the unnecessary additions to their résumé. Ted still includes his stint as a supposedly controversial DJ (a persona he named "Dr. X") at WESU, Marshall includes his basketball dunking championship from Minnesota and Lily includes her victory at a hot dog eating contest (29 dogs in eight minutes, with a nickname of Lily "The Belly" Aldrin). None of these "achievements" have anything to do with their current careers.

While Ted and Marshall delete their "special" entries from their résumés, Lily updates hers after eating 33 hot dogs in eight minutes at MacLaren's in front of a cheering crowd.

== Critical response ==
Donna Bowman of the A.V. Club gave the episode an A rating.

Joel Keller of TV Squad praised the episode for its stealthy subtext, noting it was a subtle way to show more of Barney's growing love for Robin while superficially being about Robin staying in the country and the frivolous entries the others still kept on their résumés.

IGN's Michelle Zoromski said the episode was "mediocre". She gave praise to the episode as it pushed the love story between Barney and Robin by a "smidge".
