= The Stinson Missile Crisis =

- How I Met Your Mother episode
- Episode no.: Season 7 Episode 4
- Directed by: Pamela Fryman
- Written by: Kourtney Kang
- Production code: 7ALH04
- Original air date: October 3, 2011

Guest appearances
- Alexis Denisof as Sandy Rivers; Kal Penn as Kevin; Jeff Probst as himself; Nazanin Boniadi as Nora; Vicki Lewis as Dr. Sonya; Ellen D. Williams as Patrice

Episode chronology
← Previous "Ducky Tie"	Next → "Field Trip"
- How I Met Your Mother (season 7)

"The Stinson Missile Crisis" is the fourth episode of the seventh season of the CBS sitcom How I Met Your Mother and the 140th episode overall. It aired on October 3, 2011.

== Plot ==
After assaulting a woman aiming to break up Barney's relationship with Nora, Robin must attend a court-mandated therapy session. As she tells the therapist the events leading up to the assault, Robin keeps digressing into the story of how Ted became too involved with Lily's pregnancy.

She reveals to her therapist that she has been growing jealous of the attention that Barney showers on Nora, reinforcing the fact that Robin still has feelings for him. She succeeds in getting Nora sent to France to cover a G-8 summit, Robin hopes to use the time to win Barney back. Robin helps Barney pack up all of the items he uses for running plays on women, when Robin suggests they dress up and go out on the town drunk and wasted one last time. Nora walks in, having returned early. They leave and Robin ends up getting drunk. When a victim of one of Barney's plays shows up at the bar, Robin sends her after Barney and Nora, hoping to break them up.

Ted becomes concerned that Lily is consuming wine and Cheetos while pregnant, especially after learning that her doctor allows Lily to have a little bit of everything that Lily asks for. Ted lauds the fact that they have always been a trio, but Lily pushes back, saying that Ted never gives them privacy. Marshall takes Ted's side, sympathizing with how Ted has always been the third wheel in their relationship.

Marshall and Ted attend a Lamaze class that Ted had signed the group up for. Lily refuses to participate and at the class, Ted reveals that he is afraid of losing his friends. He feels his life is lagging behind everyone else's, thinking he should have been married and having kids. They leave the class and return to Marshall and Lily's apartment. Marshall apologizes to Lily, but finds that Ted has left the building, leaving one of his socks on the apartment doorknob, which is an acknowledgement of his respect for Lily and Marshall’s privacy.

When Robin and Ted talk at their apartment, Robin realizes she was selfish in trying to break up Barney and Nora. She rushes to the restaurant and attacks the girl to stop her from getting to Barney and both women are arrested.

== Reception ==
Donna Bowman of the A.V. Club gave the episode a B, whereas Chris O'Hara of TV Fanatic gave the episode 4 out of 5 stars.

Angel Cohn of Television Without Pity graded the episode a B+, stating that the subplot on Lily and Marshall "dragged down the few funny moments of Barney and Robin scheme-busting."
