= WESU =

- Middletown, Connecticut; United States
- Broadcast area: Central Connecticut
- Frequency: 88.1 MHz

Programming
- Format: Freeform and talk
- Affiliations: NPR; Pacifica; PRX

Ownership
- Owner: Wesleyan University

History
- Founded: 1939 as a carrier current station
- First air date: February 25, 1961
- Call sign meaning: Wesleyan University

Technical information
- Licensing authority: FCC
- Facility ID: 71537
- Class: A
- ERP: 6,000 watts
- HAAT: 11.0 meters (36.1 ft)
- Transmitter coordinates: 41°33′12″N 72°39′29″W

Links
- Public license information: Public file; LMS
- Webcast: Listen live
- Website: www.wesufm.org

WESU is a college/community non-commercial FM radio station owned by Wesleyan University and licensed to Middletown, Connecticut.

== History ==
The station traces its history to 1939, with the establishment of a very low power AM carrier current campus radio station in the basement of Clark Hall. Because of its limited range, the station do not require a license or receive an official call sign, and it operated under the self-selected identifier "WES". In the 1950s, the identifier was changed to WESU. On February 25, 1961, it began operating a licensed FM station at 88.1 MHz, eventually abandoning the AM station. Between 1967 and 1990, WESU was owned and operated by an independent student group, the now-defunct Wesleyan Broadcast Association, Inc. Today, it is owned by the Trustees of Wesleyan University, and operated by students and community volunteers. In 1999, the station moved offices and studios from the basement of Clark Hall to its current location next the Wesleyan Argus on 45 Broad Street.

Asked in 2020 whether WESU is not the oldest college radio station in the United States, its station manager Benjamin Michael gave an explanation of the complexities of what counts as a "college radio station" and then stated that WESU is "the last of the original student-owned and student-operated stations."

== Programming ==
WESU operates 24 hours a day. Until 2004, WESU's format had been entirely freeform, with DJs and student staff having complete freedom to program what they wanted. The university then announced its intention to seek an affiliation with National Public Radio (NPR), and to change the station's daytime format. Douglas Bennet, then president of Wesleyan University, was a former president of NPR. The station now broadcasts news and information shows during the day. Nights and weekends, WESU continues to operate as a free-form station.

WESU broadcasts with 6,000 watts effective radiated power (ERP), circular polarization, from the top of Wesleyan University's Exley Science Center in Middletown. The programming is a mix of freeform music, National Public Radio, Public Radio International (PRI) and Pacifica Radio Network programs. From NPR and PRI, WESU airs Morning Edition, Diane Rehm, The Takeaway, Weekend Edition, The Best of Car Talk and Science Friday. From Pacifica, it broadcasts Democracy Now!, Free Speech Radio News, The Ralph Nader Hour and Exploration in Science with Dr. Michio Kaku. The station airs Connecticut-made programs like The Jack Sullivan Radio Show, DEAD AIR with Uncle John and Acoustic Blender with Bill Revill. Most hours during the day, it airs NPR News at the beginning of the hour.

The radio station was featured in a plot on the TV comedy series "How I Met Your Mother." At the end of the episode "The Possimpible", Ted Mosby (played by Josh Radnor) is deleting his work experience at the radio station from his resume.

== Notable alumni ==
- Doug Berman - Producer of Car Talk and Wait Wait… Don't Tell Me!.
- John Perry Barlow - former lyricist for the Grateful Dead.
- Pete Ganbarg (also known as Pistol Pete)(Music Director - 1986 - 1988) - President Of A&R for Atlantic Records
- Damian Hess (also known as MC Frontalot) - Disc jockey of Nerdcore hip hop fame.

== See also ==
- Campus radio
- List of college radio stations in the United States
