= Three Days of Snow =

- How I Met Your Mother episode
- Episode no.: Season 4 Episode 13
- Directed by: Pamela Fryman
- Written by: Matt Kuhn
- Production code: 4ALH13
- Original air date: January 19, 2009

Guest appearances
- Cal Gibson as Ryan; Jordan Masterson as Colin; Yves Bright as Patrice; Gita Isak as Rachel Sondheimer; Ute Werner as Viveka; Pat Crawford Brown as Thelma; Eileen Boylan as Melissa; Amy Gumenick as Amanda; Marshall Manesh as Ranjit

Episode chronology
← Previous "Benefits"	Next → "The Possimpible"
- How I Met Your Mother season 4

"Three Days of Snow" is the 13th episode in the fourth season of the television series How I Met Your Mother and 77th overall. It originally aired on January 19, 2009.

== Plot ==
Future Ted recounts events taking place during a three-day snow storm in New York. Ted and Barney set up dates with two young women in a band, planning to meet back at MacLaren's the next night. The next night, with a huge snow storm outside, they sit alone at the bar, waiting for the girls. Barney and Ted beg Carl the bartender to leave them in charge of the bar for the rest of the night, as Carl has charity work. The girls show up with their "band", which is actually the Arizona Tech "Fighting Hens" Marching Band, filling the bar with rowdy college students. After being overwhelmed with bartending, and a call from Carl telling them he is returning, Ted and Barney direct the band upstairs to their apartment to continue partying.

Lily and Marshall reflect on a tradition of Lily bringing a six-pack of beer with her every time she returns from a trip and they decide to end the tradition, but independently change their minds. Marshall gets Robin to drive him to the airport in the midst of the snow storm to pick up Lily, arguing with her about the importance of traditions in relationships. They get trapped on the side of the road after a snow plow covers them in snow due to Robin ignoring his warnings to deliver a rant, but they eventually get to the airport terminal. After realizing she wants to continue the tradition, Lily tries to find some vintage Seattle beer. Arriving at the airport an hour early, she encounters Ranjit, and they drive to a local liquor store, only to find that the store only has a keg.

When Marshall and Robin arrive, Lily is not there. Future Ted reveals that each story took place across the three days of the storm: Robin and Marshall went to pick up Lily on the first day, Ted and Barney ran MacLaren's on the second, and Lily arrived on the third. On the first day, Marshall realizes that that day's lunchtime phone-call ritual between himself and Lily had been in a voicemail Lily had left that her flight back to New York City had been delayed for two more days due to the snow storm. Marshall ignored the call because he felt that all of their traditions were slipping away and that it was a natural progression of their relationship to let their rituals die, from the lunchtime phone-call to the New Year's kiss.

When Lily arrives, she does not find Marshall at the airport. Suddenly, airport residents, the "Fighting Hens", start playing marching band instruments to the tune of "Auld Lang Syne", and Marshall greets Lily. They joyfully reunite with a late New Year's kiss and Marshall asks if he now has to bring a marching band each time he picks up Lily.

== Critical response ==
Donna Bowman of The A.V. Club gave the episode an A rating.

Michelle Zoromski of IGN gave the episode 8.3 out of 10, commenting that it was "a good episode" but pointing out a storyline flaw as "you can't take liquids on a plane anymore".

The TV Critic rated the episode 67 out of 100, describing the humour as "decent" and praising the twist at the end.

Cindy McLennan from Television Without Pity gave the episode an A−.
