= Tick Tick Tick (How I Met Your Mother) =

- How I Met Your Mother episode
- Episode no.: Season 7 Episode 10
- Directed by: Pamela Fryman
- Written by: Chris Harris
- Original air date: November 14, 2011

Guest appearances
- Nazanin Boniadi as Nora; Kal Penn as Kevin; Jerry Minor as King Charles; Alexis Denisof as Sandy Rivers; Katie Gill as Erika; Tahmus Rounds as Guitar Man; Sy Smith as Singer #1; Jacob Witkin as Nora's Dad; Robin Krieger as Nora's Mom

Episode chronology
← Previous "Disaster Averted"	Next → "The Rebound Girl"
- How I Met Your Mother season 7

"Tick Tick Tick..." is the tenth episode of the seventh season of the American sitcom How I Met Your Mother, and the 146th episode overall. It aired on CBS on November 14, 2011.

The episode was directed by Pamela Fryman and written by Chris Harris.

== Plot ==
Barney and Robin awaken in bed together from the events of the previous night. They agree to try to keep it a secret, but this will prove difficult as they are attending a cruise party with their significant others, Kevin and Nora. They realize that they cannot keep it a secret, and believing this is the way they are meant to reconcile, decide to tell Kevin and Nora they cheated on them. After several failed attempts on the boat, Barney and Robin agree to tell Nora and Kevin respectively after they return to shore.

Meanwhile, Ted, Lily, and Marshall attend a concert, where Ted insists that he and Marshall consume some "sandwiches" (a euphemism that Future Ted uses to refer to marijuana) to enjoy the concert. Marshall reluctantly agrees, though he believes that he must become more responsible because he will be a father soon, while Ted fears that life is moving too quickly and they will not be able to enjoy all the things they wanted to in the past.

While they are high, Ted and Marshall leave their seats to find some nachos for Lily. Walking around the entire arena twice they become frustrated with one another and set off on their own. They are met by a mysterious guitarist, who guides them back together and presents them with nachos. Though disappointed that they have missed the concert, Ted and Marshall conclude that time will go on whether they are ready or not. When Lily finds them, she informs them that rather being gone for several hours, they were only gone for two minutes. As captured by a security camera, Ted and Marshall actually stayed in the same section of the arena, the guitarist was really a life-size cardboard cutout, and Ted actually pulled the nachos out of a trash can. They return to the concert, but decide to leave after ten minutes.

Kevin winds up in the hospital after a drink is thrown in his face. Robin tries to use the scene to tell Kevin she wants to break up with him in order to return to Barney, but Kevin first tells Robin that he loves her and accepts anything that she may do wrong. Barney, though at first obstructed by the unexpected arrival of Nora's parents, tells Nora the truth and when he admits that it meant something to him, they break up. Barney waits at the bar for Robin, and when Ted, Marshall and Lily walk in, he informs them he broke up with Nora, and says the hard part is over. Robin arrives at the bar with Kevin, unable to bring herself to tell him. This leaves Barney heartbroken and he excuses himself, not wanting to stick around. Ted leaves the bar soon after, as he is still high. As Ted gets back to his apartment, he sees Barney picking up rose petals off Robin's bed and blowing out the flames of candles, implying he had a special night planned. Ted walks to his room without saying anything.

== Production ==
The episode was directed by Pamela Fryman and written by Chris Harris.

== Release ==
"Tick Tick Tick" first aired in the United States on CBS on November 14, 2011.

=== Critical response ===
Donna Bowman from The A.V. Club graded the episode a B+, stating that Barney trying to accept the reality that he still pines for Robin is one of the episode's defining moments, even if the price was losing Nora.

IGN rated the episode with an 8/10.

Paste's Adam Vitcavage gave the episode a 9.2 and praised the final moments of the episode, saying that Neil Patrick Harris' acting was taken to a higher level, and applauding the writers. Of the writing, he said: "We've had the chance to laugh out loud and choke back tears throughout the six and a half seasons and with 'Tick, Tick, Tick...' it seems like we’re on the track back to balancing the two emotions extremely well."
