= Ducky Tie =

- How I Met Your Mother episode
- Episode no.: Season 7 Episode 3
- Directed by: Rob Greenberg
- Written by: Carter Bays; Craig Thomas
- Production code: 7ALH03
- Original air date: September 26, 2011

Guest appearance
- Ashley Williams as Victoria

Episode chronology
← Previous "The Naked Truth"	Next → "The Stinson Missile Crisis"
- How I Met Your Mother (season 7)

"Ducky Tie" is the third episode of the seventh season of the CBS sitcom How I Met Your Mother and the 139th episode overall. It aired on September 26, 2011.

== Plot ==
Marshall has acquired a blue tie with a yellow-duck pattern, which Barney despises because he finds the design unstylish. Now that Lily is pregnant, her breasts have gotten bigger, so Barney wants to see them; both Lily and Marshall refuse. The group decide to go to "Shinjitsu", a teppanyaki restaurant, for dinner, where Barney insults the cooking style, claiming he can do with ease all the techniques the chef can do. Marshall becomes angry and challenges Barney to do every technique, with permission to touch Lily's breasts if he succeeds. If Barney fails, he must wear the ducky tie for one year.

Barney unnerves Marshall and Lily throughout dinner with suggestions that he is as adept at cooking as he claims and has gone to the effort to take the Shinjitsu training course. Lily begins to suspect that Barney has been preparing for this the entire time when she sees him and the chef looking at each other, and Marshall realizes that Barney has been conditioning Marshall to associate Barney's sneezing with the desire to go to "Shinjitsu" as part of a future scheme to use Marshall if Barney ever wanted something from him. When Barney offers to call off the bet if he is allowed to see Lily's breasts for 30 seconds in the alley, they accept until Robin points out that seeing her breasts is all he has ever wanted, leading them to believe that he had faked everything in order to get to that spot. Lily and Marshall are confident they have won the bet until after dinner, when Barney easily executes all but one of the cooking techniques. In desperation, Lily pulls up her shirt and flashes her breasts at Barney, which distracts and prevents him from succeeding at the final cooking technique. When the group returns to MacLaren's, Barney reluctantly begins wearing the ducky tie.

Meanwhile, during dinner, Ted relays the story of what happened when he ran into Victoria at the Architect's Ball. Ted makes a long-awaited apology for cheating on her, which Victoria accepts, saying she is no longer angry. However, she is surprised to learn that Ted does not find it strange that he, Robin and Barney hang out every night, despite the fact that both men dated and broke up with Robin. When Ted offers to help Victoria wash the dishes at her bakery, he learns that she is getting engaged to Klaus, a classmate from Germany. He becomes upset when he further learns that she got together with him a day and a half after she and Ted broke up, meaning that he spent years feeling guilty for kissing Robin when Victoria was planning on leaving him for Klaus anyway. They end up arguing, but begin reminiscing about their time together after Ted reveals he deeply regretted cheating on her and they had loved one another; they end up sharing a kiss.

Despite the kiss, Victoria realizes that she wants to be with Klaus and leaves to meet him for a trip in the Hamptons. Though he concludes the story there with his friends, Future Ted reveals that he had asked Victoria what she imagined their lives would be like had they stayed together. Victoria had responded that Ted's relationships over the past six years have failed because of Robin, telling him that she is a bigger part of his life than he realizes and warns him that the current friendship that he shares with Robin and Barney does not work. Though Ted had not believed Victoria at the time, Future Ted reveals that she had been right.

== Reception ==
Emily VanDerWerff of The A.V. Club rated the episode an A−.

The episode had 10.556 million viewers.
