= Pilot (How I Met Your Mother) =

- How I Met Your Mother episode
- Episode no.: Season 1 Episode 1
- Directed by: Pamela Fryman
- Written by: Carter Bays; Craig Thomas
- Cinematography by: Steven V. Silver
- Editing by: Kirk Benson
- Production code: 1ALH79
- Original air date: September 19, 2005

Guest appearances
- Lyndsy Fonseca as Daughter; David Henrie as Son; Monique Edwards as Producer; Marshall Manesh as Ranjit; Saba Homayoon as Yasmin

Episode chronology
← Previous —	Next → "Purple Giraffe"
- How I Met Your Mother season 1

"Pilot" is the pilot episode and the first episode of the first season of the American television sitcom How I Met Your Mother. Written by Carter Bays and Craig Thomas and directed by Pamela Fryman, the episode originally aired on CBS on September 19, 2005. The episode takes place in 2030, as a future Ted Mosby (voiced by Bob Saget) is telling his kids the story of how he met their mother. It flashes back to 2005 to a younger Ted (Josh Radnor) who meets Robin Scherbatsky (Cobie Smulders), a reporter who he becomes smitten for. Meanwhile, Ted's lawyer friend Marshall Eriksen (Jason Segel) plans on proposing to his girlfriend Lily Aldrin (Alyson Hannigan), a kindergarten teacher.

The episode introduces several of the show's storytelling tools, including the framing device of future Ted as the narrator, his children, and many flashbacks to the past, present, and future. Future Ted reveals early the ending of a possible relationship story when he tells his children that Robin is not the mother, but "Aunt Robin". When asked if he regretted revealing that Robin ultimately becomes Ted's platonic friend in the pilot episode, Thomas explained they stick by the decision because they did not want the show to be about "will they or won't they" like Friends and that, despite their chemistry, it would have been criminal for Ted to decide he was ready to find someone and to have it happen so quickly. He and Bays said that the show is about how "Ted meets the perfect woman, and it's [still] not his final love story."

Bays and Thomas, who had previously become writers for the Late Show with David Letterman, based the show off their time in New York City with their friends, with Ted being based on Bays and Marshall and Lily based on Thomas and his wife. The interior shots for the episode was filmed at the CBS Radford in Los Angeles, making it the only episode of the show to be filmed at the studio.

The pilot received generally positive reviews from television critics. It was viewed by 10.94 million viewers.

The phrase olive theory is most known for its appearance in this "pilot" episode. In the scene, Ted tells the story of his first date with Robin to Lily and Marshall. Ted states that since he does not like olives but his date does, they are compatible. Lily and Marshall add on that the olive theory works in their relationship, as Marshall always gives Lily his olives. However, it is later said that Marshall only pretended not to like them to make Lily happy.

== Plot ==
In 2030, Ted Mosby is telling his teenage son and daughter the story of how he met their mother. The story flashes back to 2005, when 27-year-old Ted helps his best friend and roommate Marshall Eriksen prepare to propose to his girlfriend of 9 years, Lily Aldrin.

At MacLaren's pub, Ted confides to his friend Barney Stinson that Marshall's engagement has made him realize he wants to marry. Barney insists that Ted should remain single so that he can continue being his wingman. Ted then sees Robin Scherbatsky across the bar and is instantly smitten. Ted asks her to dinner the following night, and she agrees. Meanwhile, Marshall proposes to Lily, who ecstatically accepts.

Ted and Robin hit it off, and she then invites Ted to her apartment. As Ted is about to make his move, Robin is called away by the local news channel where she works. At MacLaren's, Ted's friends tell him he should have kissed Robin before she left. Ted, accompanied by the gang, goes to her apartment after stopping by the restaurant where they had their first date and stealing the blue French horn that she had admired. While waiting outside in the car, Barney thinks Marshall is subconsciously scared of getting married, but Marshall disagrees and affirms his love for Lily.

Robin and Ted resume their date. As they are about to kiss, however, Ted impulsively tells her he is in love with her, destroying his chances with her. After a lingering goodbye, he returns to MacLaren's with the gang, where they tell him he should have kissed Robin.

Future Ted tells his children that it is the story of how he met their "Aunt Robin." Confused, the kids say that they thought it was the story of how he met their mother, and Ted reminds them that it is a long story.

== Production ==
=== Casting ===
Thomas and Bays based the characters on their friends, with Ted being based on Bays and Marshall and Lily based on Thomas and his wife. Thomas' wife Rebecca was initially reluctant to have a character based on her, but agreed if they could get Alyson Hannigan to play her. Hannigan was looking to do more comedy work, and was available. Jason Biggs and Scott Foley were offered the role of Ted Mosby, but turned it down, Biggs wasn't sure about committing to a TV series; a decision he would later regret. Josh Radnor and Jason Segel, who were cast as Ted and Marshall, respectively, were not well known, though Segel had been a cast member on the short-lived Freaks and Geeks and a recurring guest star on Judd Apatow's follow-up Undeclared. The role of Barney was initially envisioned as a "John Belushi-type character". Several actors auditioned for the role, including Jim Parsons, before Neil Patrick Harris won the role after being invited to an audition by the show's casting director Megan Branman. Pamela Fryman invited Bob Saget to be the voiceover narrator, Future Ted, explaining to him that the show would be like The Wonder Years but "kind of into the future". Saget either went to the television studio and recorded the narration while watching the episode, or did so separately and rerecorded with the episode if necessary. He normally did not attend table readings, but did so for the last episode. In various interviews Bays and Thomas have stated that "a pretty famous actress" turned down the role of Robin, whom they revealed in February 2014 to have been Jennifer Love Hewitt. They then cast Cobie Smulders, also an unknown, for the role. Bays and Thomas later said, "Thank God we did for a million reasons... when Ted's seeing her for the first time, America's seeing her for the first time—the intriguingness of that propelled the show going forward and kept the show alive".

=== Filming ===
The interior shots for the episode were filmed at the CBS Radford in Los Angeles, making it the only episode of the show to be filmed at the studio. MacLaren's, an Irish bar in the middle of New York, in which some of the show is set, is loosely based on four favorite bars of Bays, Thomas and others from the Late Show staff. They include: McGee's, a Midtown tavern near the Ed Sullivan Theater where the Late Show is taped; McHale's, a legendary Hell's Kitchen bar which closed in 2006; Chumley's, a since-closed historic Greenwich Village pub; and Fez, another closed bar on the Upper West Side. McGee's had a mural that Bays and Thomas both liked and wanted to incorporate into the show. The name for the bar is from Carter Bays' assistant, Carl MacLaren; the bartender in the show is also named Carl, whose last name is later revealed to be MacLaren in the Season 8 episode The Time Travelers.

== Reception ==
=== Ratings ===
In its original American broadcast, the pilot episode of How I Met Your Mother was watched by 10.94 million viewers and averaged a 3.9 rating among adults ages 18–49.

=== Reviews ===
The episode received generally favorable reviews, garnering a score of 69 from Metacritic. Seth Thrasher gave the episode 5/5 saying: "...this is one of the funniest sitcoms I've seen in a LONG, LONG time". He also said that he was impressed by Harris' character: "I never realized Neil Patrick Harris was so damned funny. His character, Barney, is quite possibly the funniest new sitcom character to debut on television in ages". He also praised the rest of the cast. Brian Lowry of Variety said that it was a "bright" and "cleverly constructed" half-hour, putting it in the company of Two and a Half Men. "It's not often that a pilot has the polished feel of a show that's been around for a while, but How I Met Your Mother should be a solid bridge between The King of Queens and the aforementioned Two and a Half Men."
