= Becki Newton =

American actress (born 1978)

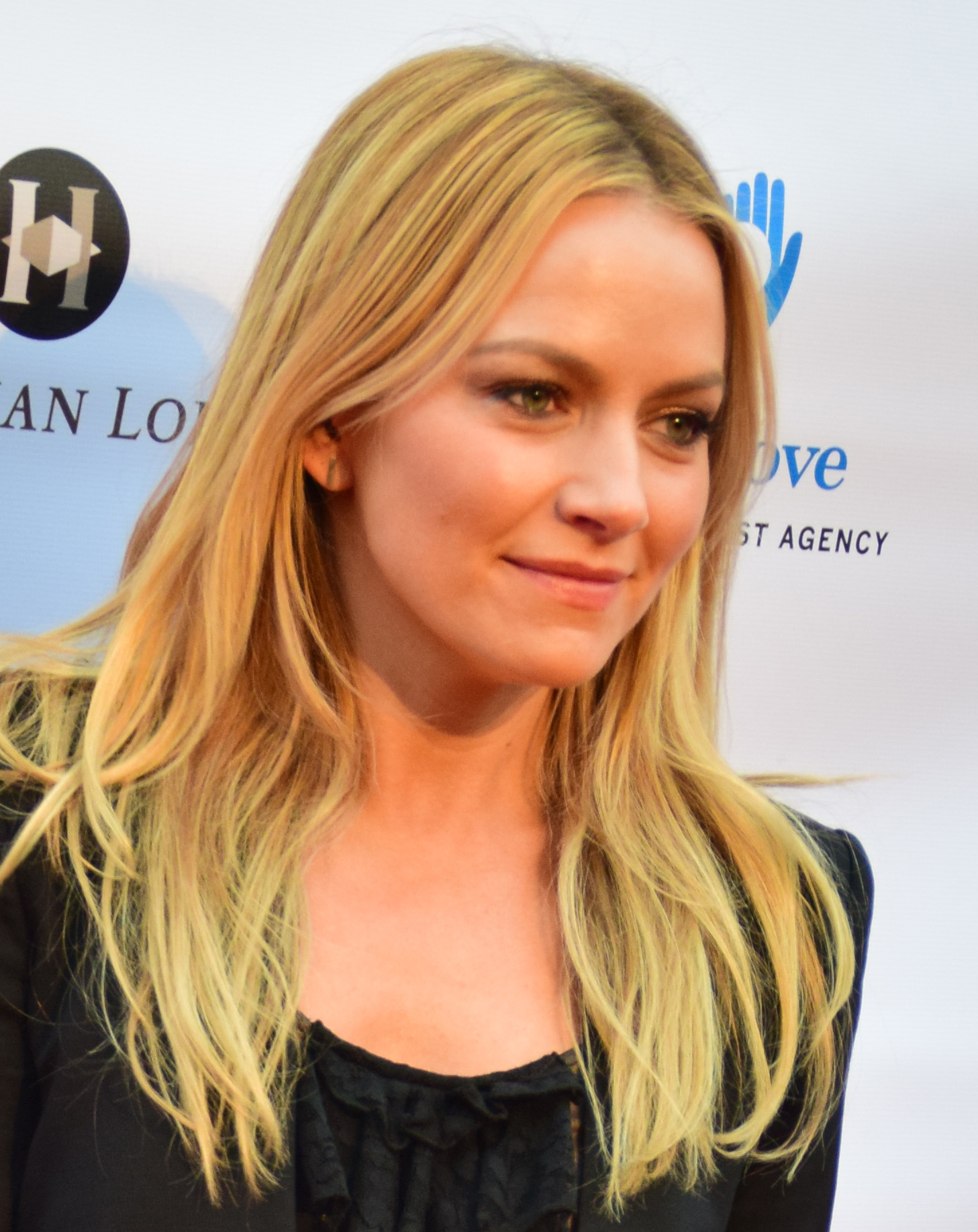
- Newton in 2015
- Born: July 4, 1978 (age 48)
- Education: University of Pennsylvania (B.A.)
- Occupation: Actress
- Years active: 2001–present
- Spouse: Chris Diamantopoulos (m. 2005)
- Children: 4
- Relatives: Matt Newton (brother); Stephanie Chase (maternal aunt); Bruce Chase (maternal grandfather); Sienna Miller (first cousin once removed); Savannah Miller (first cousin once removed)

Becki Newton (born July 4, 1978) is an American actress known for her roles as Amanda Tanen on Ugly Betty, Quinn Garvey on How I Met Your Mother, and Lorna Crane on The Lincoln Lawyer.

== Early life ==
Newton was born in New Haven, Connecticut. Newton is a first cousin once removed of actress Sienna Miller. She attended the University of Pennsylvania.

After graduation, Newton moved to New York City and landed several roles in television commercials for such companies as Olive Garden. She also appeared in a public service video, "Keg Party", about the dangers of drinking.

== Career ==
Newton portrayed Amanda Tanen in the ABC comedy-drama series Ugly Betty from 2006 to 2010. With her co-star Michael Urie, Newton co-hosted the official Ugly Betty podcast. She also starred in ABC.com's web series Mode After Hours opposite Urie. Ugly Betty was cancelled in 2010 after four seasons.

In late 2009, Newton performed at a New York City Center Encores! presentation of the Gershwin musical Girl Crazy, which was directed by Jerry Zaks. She portrayed Molly Gray and performed opposite her real-life husband Chris Diamantopoulos.

Newton starred in the television series Love Bites in 2011. The hour-long romantic comedy was created by the executive producer Cindy Chupack, who worked on Sex and the City. NBC announced the pick up of the series in May 2010. However, with Newton announcing her pregnancy, her co-star Jordana Spiro contractually obligated to stay with her other show, My Boys (which was later cancelled), and Chupack's desire to leave the show, Love Bites was pushed back to midseason. Love Bites was ultimately aired in July 2011 on NBC and was cancelled after its first-season order of episodes was burned off.

In November 2011, Newton was cast on CBS's How I Met Your Mother as Quinn Garvey, a love interest for Neil Patrick Harris's character Barney Stinson, where she played a stripper. In 2013, Newton starred in the midseason Fox comedy series The Goodwin Games. In 2018, Newton began appearing in a recurring role on the HBO TV series Divorce, playing Jackie Giannopolis, the new girlfriend of Thomas Haden Church's character.

On September 13, 2019, it was announced that Newton would once again team up with Urie on a sitcom project for CBS and Warner Bros. Television called Fun, for which both will co-star and co-executive produce with creator Michael Patrick King and fellow Ugly Betty showrunners Tracy Poust and Jon Kinnally. However, the pilot did not move forward.

On February 2, 2021, it was announced that Newton would replace Kiele Sanchez as Lorna Crane, Mickey Haller's second ex-wife and office manager, in the Netflix series The Lincoln Lawyer.

== Personal life ==
Newton met her husband, actor Chris Diamantopoulos, in a subway station in New York and they married on May 12, 2005. She gave birth to a son in early November 2010 and a daughter in early 2014. Newton gave birth to her second daughter in 2020 and her third in 2022.

Her older brother, Matt Newton, is also an actor. He played the recurring role of Marc St. James' boyfriend Troy in the fourth and final season of Ugly Betty. Her mother, Jennifer, is an artist, and her aunt, Stephanie Chase, is a classical violinist.

== Filmography ==
=== Film ===
Year	Title	Role	Notes
2004	P.S.	Rebecca	
2007	August Rush	Jennifer	
2019	Otherhood	Andrea	

=== Television ===
Year	Title	Role	Notes
2001	Burly TV	Herself	Host
2003	Cold Case	Melanie Whitley (1976)	Episode: "Look Again"
2003–2004	Guiding Light	Fantasy daughter	Unknown episodes
2004	American Dreams	Mindy	3 episodes
2004	Law & Order: Special Victims Unit	Colleen Heaton	Episode: "Weak"
2005	Charmed	"Glamoured" Piper Halliwell	Episode: "Something Wicca This Way Goes...?"
2006–2010	Ugly Betty	Amanda Tanen (Note: Also makes appearances as Young Fey Sommers in two episodes and Ruthie in the episode "Sofia's Choice.")	Main cast; 85 episodes Nominated—Screen Actors Guild Award for Outstanding Performance by an Ensemble in a Comedy Series
2007	American Dad!	Blonde Hoe (voice)	Episode: "When a Stan Loves a Woman"
2007	American Dad!	Mrs. Hannigan (voice)	Episode: "I Can't Stan You"
2008–2009	Mode After Hours	Amanda Tanen	Main cast; 19 episodes (Ugly Betty spin-off)
2011	Love Bites	Annie Matopoulos	Main cast; 6 episodes
2012–2013	How I Met Your Mother	Quinn Garvey	10 episodes
2013	The Goodwin Games	Chloe Goodwin	Main cast; 7 episodes
2014	Mickey Mouse	Cruise ship waitress (voice)	Episode: "Flipperboobootosis"
2014	American Dad!	Margie (voice)	Episode: "Introducing the Naughty Stewardesses"
2015	Weird Loners	Caryn Goldfarb	Main cast; 6 episodes
2018–2019	Divorce	Jackie Giannopolis	Recurring role (season 2), main role (season 3)
2018–2019	Tell Me a Story	Katrina Thorn	Recurring (season 1)
2022–present	The Lincoln Lawyer	Lorna Crane	Main cast; 40 episodes

=== Web ===
Year	Title	Role	Notes
2008–2009	Mode After Hours	Amanda Tanen	19 episodes

== Awards and nominations ==
Year	Awards	Category	Nominated work	Result
2007	Screen Actors Guild Award	Screen Actors Guild Award for Outstanding Performance by an Ensemble in a Comedy Series	Ugly Betty	Nominated
2008	Screen Actors Guild Award	Screen Actors Guild Award for Outstanding Performance by an Ensemble in a Comedy Series	Ugly Betty	Nominated
2008	Ewwy Awards	Best Supporting Actress in a Comedy Series	Ugly Betty	Nominated
2009	Glamour Awards	Glamour Award for Comedy Actress	Ugly Betty	Won
2009	Ewwy Awards	Best Supporting Actress in a Comedy Series	Ugly Betty	Nominated
2013	OFTA Awards	Best Guest Actress in a Comedy Series	How I Met Your Mother	Nominated
