= Ted Mosby =

Fictional character on the CBS sitcom "How I Met Your Mother"

- How I Met Your Mother character
- Josh Radnor as Ted Mosby
- First appearance: "Pilot"
- Last appearance: "Last Forever"
- Created by: Carter Bays; Craig Thomas
- Portrayed by: Josh Radnor
- Voiced by: Bob Saget (Future Ted)
- Birth date: April 25, 1978

In-universe information
- Full name: Theodore Evelyn Mosby
- Aliases: Teddy, T-Dawg, Schmosby, T-Mose, Crosby, Doctor X, Teddy Bear, Teddy Boy, Architect of Destruction, Professor Brosby, Senor Tedifier, El Ganso con la Riñonera, Teddy Westchester, Lady Tedwina Slowsby, Emsbry Postlethwaite
- Gender: Male
- Occupation: Architect (season 1–4 and season 6–present); Professor of Architecture (season 5–present)
- Family: Virginia Mosby (mother); Alfred Mosby (father); Heather Mosby (sister); Clint (stepfather); Unnamed Grandmother
- Spouses: Tracy McConnell-Mosby (m. 2020–2024) (broadcast ending) (m. 2020-) (alternate DVD ending)
- Significant others: Robin Scherbatsky (girlfriend; broadcast ending); Victoria (ex-girlfriend); Stella Zinman (ex-fiancée); Becky (ex-girlfriend); Zoey Pierson (ex-girlfriend); Jeanette Peterson (ex-girlfriend)
- Children: Penny Mosby (daughter, born in 2015, played by Lyndsy Fonseca); Luke Mosby (son, born in 2017, played by David Henrie)
- Relatives: Jimmy Mosby (cousin); Stacy (cousin); Charity (cousin once removed, via Stacy); Unnamed cousins once removed
- Nationality: American

Theodore Evelyn Mosby is a fictional character and the protagonist in the American sitcom How I Met Your Mother, portrayed by Josh Radnor. He serves as the show's narrator from the future, voiced by Bob Saget, as he tells his children the "long version" of how he met their mother.

== Character overview ==
Ted is the central character of How I Met Your Mother. The character was born April 25, 1978, he is from Shaker Heights, Ohio (like the show's creator, Carter Bays), a graduate of Wesleyan University (like Bays and show co-creator Craig Thomas), an Eagle Scout, and an architect. Ted continues his profession as an architect in New York City, and as a professor of architecture at Columbia University.

After his best friend, Marshall Eriksen (Jason Segel), gets engaged in the pilot episode, Ted decides to try to find his soulmate, often referred to as "The One". This quest informs the audience of the general direction of the show, along with Ted's relationship with Marshall, Marshall's wife Lily Aldrin (Alyson Hannigan), Ted's on/off girlfriend Robin Scherbatsky (Cobie Smulders), and his other best friend Barney Stinson (Neil Patrick Harris).

=== Personality ===
Ted is prone to questionable (and often desperate) romantic gestures; in the pilot episode, for example, he steals a blue French horn (nicknamed "The Smurf Penis") that was a topic of conversation in his first date with Robin, and then scares Robin off by telling her he is in love with her. In a similar vein, he dresses up as a "hanging chad" and attends the same party every year for Halloween, in the hopes of meeting "The Slutty Pumpkin”, a woman dressed as a jack-o'-lantern (complete with strategically placed holes) whom he once met at a Halloween party. (However, when he finally meets the woman, he discovers that they have no romantic chemistry whatsoever.)

Ted describes himself as "half-Jewish". He is seen cheering for the Cleveland Indians when they play the New York Yankees at a baseball game. He and Marshall were randomly assigned as freshman-year roommates at Wesleyan, and became best friends on a long, ill-fated road trip.

In several episodes, Ted claims to have been "vomit-free since '93", although it is untrue. Ted speaks French and knows American Sign Language, and has an annoying habit of correcting everything that people around him say. As a child, he had a detective club called "The Mosby Boys", which consisted of him and his sister, Heather. Ted also speaks and reads Spanish, albeit clumsily. Pablo Neruda is one of his favorite writers. He also has a fondness for high culture such as classical literature and philosophy, and has a tendency to become boring and pretentious when discussing it. He also has an interest in solving the crossword.

== Relationship with other characters ==
=== Robin Scherbatsky ===
In the pilot episode, Ted meets Robin at MacLaren's, the bar in which the main characters hang out. They go on a date, which Ted ruins by impulsively telling her he is in love with her. They decide to be friends, but they have lingering feelings for each other. Eventually, Ted wins Robin over, and they start dating. Their relationship last for a year until they break up at the end of the second season upon realizing that they want different things. They decide to remain friends, and are roommates between the fourth and seventh seasons.

Despite their romantic history, Ted and Robin go on to become good friends with one another and are very supportive of each other. The two eventually go on to see other people, and both seem fine until Robin and Barney sleep together in the third season, which causes a rift within their friend group. Ted later gets over it, however, and eventually becomes supportive of Robin's relationship with Barney.

Despite seemingly moving on, however, Ted never quite gets over Robin. He is particularly conflicted when she and Barney get engaged; he wants her to be happy, but cannot shake the feeling that he and Robin are meant to be together. Although he initially plans to win Robin back, Ted ultimately decides against it, as he sees that Barney makes her happy; he instead decides to remove himself from their life together by accepting a job in Chicago and planning to move there right after their wedding. On the day of Robin's wedding, she panics and tries to run off with him, but Ted knows it would not work and tells her that he no longer feels that way about her. That night, Ted meets Tracy McConnell, and they fall in love, eventually getting married. The series ends in the year 2030, with Tracy having died six years before. Ted's children encourage him to date Robin, and he brings the blue French horn he stole for her on their first date to her apartment. She smiles at him with tears in her eyes; a deleted scene with Lily and Marshall confirms they chose to rekindle their relationship.

However, in the DVD-exclusive alternate ending of the show, it is revealed that Tracy is still alive and that she and Ted are happily married.

=== Tracy McConnell ===
Ted meets the love of his life, Tracy McConnell, in 2013 after Barney and Robin's wedding, being the last of the gang to meet her (Barney met her six months prior, Lily meets her on the train to the wedding, Marshall meets her on the way to the Farhampton Inn, and Robin meets her moments before she gets married.) Tracy is the focal point of Ted's stories to his children and has actually encountered her at multiple points in his life before meeting her.

Ted ultimately meets Tracy while he is waiting for the train to the airport to take him to Chicago; however, he falls in love with her at first sight and changes his mind about moving. The following night, Ted calls Tracy and the two begin dating. Almost two years later, they get engaged and start to plan for a huge wedding. In 2015, they delay the wedding because she gets pregnant with their daughter, Penny; she gets pregnant again in 2017 with their son, Luke. They finally get married in 2020 and live together until Tracy dies in 2024. In the alternate ending, Tracy is still alive at the time Ted tells their children how they met.

=== Marshall Eriksen ===
Marshall is Ted's best friend. Their relationship is a core element within the series, with them rarely being at odds and sharing common interests in a wide variety of things, particularly the film Star Wars Episode IV: A New Hope. They were roommates in college, and became best friends following an ill-fated road trip. By the time Ted tells his children the story, he and Marshall have been friends for 34 years.

While Ted and Marshall are best friends, Marshall also becomes good friends with Barney despite the latter's repeated claims that he is truly Ted's best friend. The three enjoy watching Star Wars, hanging out at the bar, and talking about girls despite Marshall only ever sleeping with one woman in his life.

Ted is also very close friends with Marshall's wife, Lily, and the three have shared a longtime bond with one another since college. Despite sometimes feeling like a third wheel, Ted is extremely supportive of Marshall's relationship with Lily and would do anything to make sure they stay together. When Lily breaks up with Marshall at the end of the first season, Ted helps Marshall through the aftermath. All three share an apartment together from seasons one through four.

Marshall has always had faith in Ted's relationship with Robin, as well, encouraging him to go after her. He even has a running bet with Lily that Ted and Robin will end up together.

=== Barney Stinson ===
Barney is Ted's other best friend. The two met at MacLaren's in 2001 and he told Ted he was going to "teach him how to live". Barney is Ted's self-appointed "wingman", and they spend time together meeting women. Despite their conflicting views on life and relationships, Barney often acts as a mentor for Ted when it comes to picking up women, making important life decisions and living his life to the fullest. Barney insists that he is Ted's best friend, despite the fact that Ted repeatedly says that Marshall fills that role in his life. They have a brief falling out after Barney sleeps with Robin, but reconcile when Barney risks his life to be there for Ted after the latter gets into a car accident. Ted even tries to teach Barney how to be a good boyfriend to Robin, serves as his best man at his and Robin's wedding, and convinces Robin not to run out on him on their wedding day. Ted is also there for the birth of Barney's daughter in 2020.

=== Lily Aldrin ===
Lily has been close friends with Ted since they went to Wesleyan together. For several years they lived with Marshall in the same apartment. Despite sometimes being a third wheel in their relationship, Lily often relies on Ted's insight when it comes to Marshall. She is fiercely protective of Ted, and even goes so far as to break him up with women she does not believe are right for him - including Robin.

=== Victoria ===
Victoria is Ted's ex-girlfriend. They meet at a wedding and fall in love. After two months of dating, she moves to Germany and they try to have a long-distance relationship. They break up after Ted kisses Robin. Six years later, they meet again, and Victoria ends up leaving a man at the altar for Ted. Ted and Victoria get back together and last for a while. Ultimately, however, they break up again after Victoria insists that Ted end his friendship with Robin.

Victoria is portrayed by Ashley Williams.

=== Stella Zinman ===
Stella is Ted's ex-fiancé. They meet when Stella, a dermatologist, removes a lower back tattoo that Ted had gotten while drunk, and Ted is instantly smitten. She rejects his advances at first, but he wins her over after taking her on a two-minute date, complete with dinner, a movie, and a goodnight kiss. They get engaged after Ted has a near-death experience and realizes he loves her. He proposes to her in an arcade to which she says yes, although they have a few struggles in the process. On their wedding day, however, Stella leaves Ted at the altar for her ex-boyfriend Tony (Jason Jones), the father of her daughter.

Being left at the altar causes Ted to go into a deep depression to the point during which he refuses to go anywhere they went together. Despite initially wanting to confront her over leaving him for Tony, Ted ultimately decides not to after seeing Stella, Tony, and their daughter happy together as a family. No longer angry about what Stella did to him, Ted walks away without saying a word to her.

Stella is portrayed by Sarah Chalke.

=== Zoey Pierson ===
Zoey is another of Ted's ex-girlfriends. He has strong feelings for her, even though she is already married and is leading a campaign to preserve the building that Ted's company, GNB, plans to knock down to make way for the skyscraper that Ted has always wanted to design. She leaves her husband, The Captain (Kyle McLachlan), for him, and he briefly considers abandoning his dream of contributing a building to the New York City skyline so they can be together. In the end, however, Ted chooses the building over her, and they break up.

Zoey is portrayed by Jennifer Morrison.

=== Luke and Penny Mosby ===
Luke and Penny are Ted's two children with Tracy. Penny was born in 2015, and Luke in 2017. In the year 2030, six years after Tracy's death, he tells them the story of how he met their mother. The two are frequently seen at the beginning of episodes, sometimes looking bored or disinterested in Ted's stories leading to when he met their mother and often question whether or not they are that important, to which Ted always responds they are. At the end of the series finale, they convince Ted to go after Robin.

Luke is portrayed by David Henrie, and Penny by Lyndsey Fonseca.

== Character arc ==
Ted decides to meet his soulmate and settle down after Marshall and Lily get engaged. He meets and falls for Robin, but their mutual attraction is hampered by Robin's insistence that she does not want to get married or have children, so they agree to just be friends.

For a time in the first season, Ted dates a baker named Victoria, whom he meets at a friend's wedding. She accepts a culinary fellowship in Germany, prompting a long-distance relationship, which does not last, due in large part to his persistent feelings for Robin. Ted upsets Robin by implying that Victoria broke up with him when she did not; Ted and Robin make out before both women realize they've been deceived. Ted and Robin ultimately reconcile as friends, and, in "Come On", Ted makes one last attempt to win her over, hiring a string quartet with blue instruments to play in her apartment while he makes his appeal. She finally falls for him some time later when Ted apparently summons a storm with a complicated rain dance. They date throughout the second season, but break up in "Something Blue" upon realizing that they want different things from life.

At a St. Patrick's Day party he and Barney attended, his future wife was also present, although he did not meet her that night. Once he returns to the room of the party the morning after, he picks up a yellow umbrella which can be seen blowing in the wind in the season promo. Also, he becomes the second main character to actually own a car (a blue Toyota Camry Hybrid) after getting a raise at his job. By the end of the episode, Ted decides to sell the car to help Marshall with his money problems.

At the beginning of the third season, an inebriated Ted gets a tattoo on his lower back (his "tramp stamp"). He goes to see Dr. Stella Zinman in order to have it removed, and goes on a date with her in "The Platinum Rule." In "Ten Sessions," he falls for her, and after the tattoo is removed, Ted takes her on a "two-minute date" in which he fits an entire night of romance into the two minutes she can spare before work. They begin dating, and at the end of "Miracles" Ted proposes to her. She says yes at the beginning of the fourth season. In "Shelter Island", Ted invites Stella's ex-boyfriend, Tony, to his wedding; Stella and Tony rekindle their relationship, and Stella leaves a devastated Ted at the altar.

Ted's life continues its downward slide during the fourth season. After being left at the altar, Ted has trouble getting back into the dating world, and his job becomes a source of trouble as well. After being hired to design a project for Goliath National Bank, he is fired after weeks of unsuccessful work. He attempts to remedy this by starting his own firm, Mösbius Designs, but it is largely unsuccessful. In the season four finale "The Leap", Ted ultimately accepts a job as an architecture professor offered to him by Tony as a peace offering, though Tony's film The Wedding Bride, released in the next season, pits a caricature of Ted as its villain against a romanticized version of Tony and Stella.

He reaches a low point in his personal life in Season 7 and confides in Robin that he is beginning to believe he will never find "The One". This reaches a breaking point when he tells Robin he still loves her after she breaks up with her boyfriend Kevin (Kal Penn). However, Robin does not reciprocate his feelings and moves out. Eventually Ted gives the apartment back to Marshall and Lily and moves into the apartment Barney's girlfriend Quinn (Becki Newton) used to live in. In the episode "Trilogy Time" it is revealed that by 2015, Ted's daughter will already be born.

After a few months, Ted decides to patch things up with Robin, and she helps him realize that Victoria was the only woman who has even come close to being right for him. When Ted calls Victoria, she shows up in a wedding dress and says she is ready to run away with him. Initially, he tries to take her back to her wedding, but after realizing how much he likes her he changes his mind and they ride off into the sunset. After dating for a few months, Ted proposes, but Victoria says she will only marry Ted on the condition that he end his friendship with Robin. Ted tells Victoria that although he is no longer in love with Robin, she is like family and an irreplaceable part of his life. Victoria wishes him luck, and breaks up with him.

After Victoria, in the Season 8 episode "P.S. I Love You", Ted meets Jeanette Peterson (Abby Elliott), his final girlfriend before meeting The Mother. Ted and Jeanette meet on the subway after Ted notices they read the same book. Jeanette turns out to be obsessed with him: he finds out that she had been stalking him for a year and a half (since his appearance on New York Magazine), bought the same book as him 10 minutes after him (the book they were both reading on the subway), and started a fire outside his lecture hall to meet him. While his friends are horrified, Ted finds this romantic and ignores the warning signs. In "Weekend at Barney's", Jeanette breaks up with Ted; she takes virtually everything he says and does as proof that he is cheating on her. Barney tries to set up Ted with other women to get his mind off Jeanette, although Jeanette finds him at the bar and they get back together. However, this does not last long: Jeanette finds Barney's playbook in Ted's apartment and destroys the place, locking Ted out and throwing his things out the window to the street below. At this moment, Ted decides he is done with the single life and ready to settle down.

Although happy for them, Ted is upset when Robin and Barney get engaged. In "The Time Travelers", future Ted fantasizes about seeking out The Mother weeks before they actually meet, so that he can tell her how desperate he is to meet her. He is supportive of his friends' engagement, but ultimately realizes his lingering feelings for Robin would make it difficult to be around them once they are married, and so plans to move to Chicago the day after the wedding.

The series' final season revolves around the weekend of Barney and Robin's wedding, during which Ted wrestles with his feelings for Robin. He goes to extreme lengths to find a locket that Robin had buried in Central Park years before, which she wants as a "sign from the universe" that she should marry Barney. Moments before the wedding, Robin has cold feet and tells Ted that she should be marrying him instead of Barney. Ted swallows his true feelings and says that he no longer loves her in that way. He then stands by as Robin marries Barney, and bids an affectionate goodbye to his friends. The season also contains a number of flashforward scenes depicting Ted's life with the Mother, including their first date, the day he proposed and the birth of their second child.

In the final episode of the series, "Last Forever", it is revealed that Ted finally meets his wife, whose name is shown to be Tracy McConnell, at a train station as he is about to leave for Chicago. They hit it off immediately, and date for a year before getting engaged. They do not actually marry for another five years, during which time they have two children, Penny and Luke. Tracy dies in 2024.

Upon the conclusion of his story, his children tell him that it barely contained any mention of their mother and was more focused on Robin, who divorced Barney after a brief marriage. While Ted denies it, the children say that he is clearly seeking their approval to date Robin, which they grant. In the final scene of the series, Ted stands outside Robin's window, holding the blue French horn from their first date.

== Future Ted ==
Future Ted, voiced by Bob Saget, narrates every episode to his children in 2030, framed as the story of how he met their mother. The Mother was finally revealed in the season 8 finale "Something New," played by Cristin Milioti.

In the third season premiere, "Wait for It", Ted's children already know the "short version" of the story of how he met their mother, and that it was an incident involving her yellow umbrella. Some clues given are that Ted's future wife is a college student studying economics, as she was in the classroom on Ted's first day as a professor, where he initially went to the wrong room and started teaching Architecture 101 to what, actually, was Economics 305. It was also mentioned that she was at the same nightclub as Ted and Barney on St. Patrick's Day, 2008. In the first season episode "Belly Full of Turkey", Future Ted jokes to his kids that a stripper he meets named Tracy is The Mother (The Mother's first name also turned out to be Tracy in the finale). Future Ted told his kids that he met their mother "on the day of the wedding" which is later revealed to be the day of Barney and Robin's wedding, in which Ted is the best man. In the season premiere of the eighth season, Ted is reading a book while waiting at the "Farhampton" train station after Barney and Robin's wedding when "The Mother" (indicated by future Ted's voiceover and the appearance of the signature yellow umbrella) is shown arriving at the same station via taxicab, though whether or not they meet at that time is unconfirmed as the episode fades to credits with the two unaware of each other. In the Season 8 episode entitled "Band or DJ?" Future Ted reveals in a flashback that "The Mother" played bass guitar in the band that performed at Barney and Robin's wedding. Although the flashback shows that Ted does see The Mother at the wedding, it is implied that they do not actually formally meet there. Ted and his wife are shown in a flashforward standing outside a movie theater advertising The Wedding Bride III during the episode "No Pressure", although the wife's face is not shown nor is her identity revealed.

Throughout the series, Future Ted always uses past tense when referring to The Mother. Among other clues, this led many viewers to suspect that The Mother had died by 2030, which was confirmed in the broadcast finale.
