= Lily Aldrin =

Fictional character on the CBS sitcom How I Met Your Mother

- How I Met Your Mother character
- Alyson Hannigan as Lily Aldrin
- First appearance: "Pilot"
- Last appearance: "Last Forever"
- Created by: Carter Bays; Craig Thomas
- Portrayed by: Alyson Hannigan; Piper Mackenzie Harris (11-years-old); Francesca Capaldi (7-years-old)

In-universe information
- Occupation: Kindergarten teacher (2005–2013), art consultant (2013–present)
- Family: Mickey Aldrin (father); Janice Aldrin (mother)
- Spouse: Marshall Eriksen (m. 2007)
- Children: Marvin Wait-For-It Eriksen; Daisy Eriksen; Unnamed third child
- Relatives: Morris Aldrin (grandfather); Rita Aldrin (grandmother); Lois (grandmother); Amy (cousin)
- Nationality: American

Lily Aldrin is a fictional character in the CBS television series How I Met Your Mother. Lily is portrayed by American actress Alyson Hannigan. She is married to Marshall Eriksen and is best friends with Ted Mosby, Robin Scherbatsky, and Barney Stinson. Lily is a kindergarten teacher and an amateur painter. In the eighth season, she gets a job as an art consultant. She is the only member of the original main cast who has not appeared in every episode because Alyson Hannigan took leave after giving birth to her first child.

== Casting ==
Series creator Craig Thomas explained that he based Marshall and Lily on himself and his wife Rebecca. Rebecca had been upset after learning this, but, as a fan of Buffy the Vampire Slayer, was consoled when Alyson Hannigan was cast. Hannigan was looking to do more comedy work after having worked on the American Pie series and was available for the show.

== Character overview ==
Lily Aldrin, born on March 22, 1978, grew up in Park Slope, Brooklyn, New York. She is the daughter of Janice Aldrin, whom Lily describes as a feminist, and who worked two jobs to support the family. The creators stated in commentary that there is no evidence to the contrary that Lily's grandfather is astronaut Buzz Aldrin – and like Buzz Aldrin, her grandfather is said to have fought in the Korean War. Lily's father, Mickey (Chris Elliott), is an unsuccessful board game creator living in his parents' basement. Janice and Mickey divorced when Lily was a child. Lily is estranged from her father – an absentee parent who she claims "broke my heart every day for 20 years" – until he promises to be there for her following the birth of her son.

During her high school and college years, she was a part of the goth subculture, dyeing her hair and wearing stereotypical "goth" clothes. She dumped her high school boyfriend, Scooter (David Burtka), on prom night, admitting she only dated him because he looked like Kurt Cobain. He remains obsessed with her for years afterward. She met Marshall during her freshman year at Wesleyan University in 1996 and dated him throughout college.

As of 2023, Lily is 45 years old, meaning she was born circa 1978. According to her résumé, she is fluent in Italian, certified in teaching English as a Second Language, and proficient in Photoshop, Quark, and Java.

Lily frequently states her need for regular sex, saying that if she went without for too long, she'd be "out there selling it for a nickel." She has a more than passing sexual interest in other women, suggesting she may be bisexual. In particular, she has confessed several times, albeit in a seemingly joking fashion, that she finds Robin sexually attractive, and that Robin has been the subject of some "confusing dreams.” Well aware of Lily's sexual attraction to her, Robin at one point says that she won't go near Lily after she's been drinking martinis, as she is prone to flirt quite strongly with her and even try to get the guys to dare them to make out. Robin tends to alternate between ignoring Lily’s advances and being disturbed by them whenever they show themselves.

Lily possesses a skill for manipulating people and situations to achieve her desired outcomes. Her particular talent lies in orchestrating breakups between couples whom she perceives as not being well-suited for each other. Barney calls her a "diabolical puppet master" and "pure evil", while Ted calls her a "psychopath.”

== Character history ==
Lily and Marshall get engaged in the fall of 2005, as portrayed in the series pilot. Towards the end of the first season, she reveals to Robin that she has been having second thoughts about getting married without having experienced much else of life before Marshall. Those doubts intensify, and she acts upon them, applying for a painting fellowship in San Francisco. She is accepted and, after arguing with Marshall on and off – with several pause breaks in between for drinks, dinner at Red Lobster, and sex – Lily finally says that she cannot promise Marshall that she would return to him after the fellowship. They break up, and she goes to San Francisco.

She returns to New York three months later and confesses that leaving has been a mistake. She begs Marshall to take her back, but Marshall can't get over his wounded pride and refuses. They eventually get back together, however, and resume their engagement. They finally get married at the end of the second season.

In the third season, it is revealed that Lily has a penchant for shopping, particularly when faced with adversity. To manage her multiple credit cards, she maintains a "box of shame." Lily and Marshall grapple with the challenges posed by her credit card bills, especially as they contemplate purchasing an apartment. This situation forces Marshall to forgo his aspirations of becoming an environmental lawyer and instead accept a position at a large corporate firm. Despite these sacrifices, they secure the house, only to discover that the neighborhood is in close proximity to a water sewage treatment plant, and their apartment has a crooked floor.

Lily, along with Ted and Marshall, occasionally indulges in "sandwiches" (Future Ted's euphemism for marijuana) during college and at their 20th college reunion.

Out of all of the characters, she is the only one Barney chooses to confide in when he realizes that he is in love with Robin. In the fifth season, Lily compels Robin and Barney to come clean about their relationship by removing the doorknob from Robin's room at the apartment and urging them to have "the talk." Despite exchanging a series of notes under the door with ambiguous explanations, Lily remains unsatisfied. In an attempt to be released, Robin and Barney falsely claim to be a couple. However, after exiting the apartment hand-in-hand, Lily confides in Ted that "they didn't realize they weren't lying."

Lily and Marshall are both ecstatic to have another couple to hang out with. They invite Robin and Barney for an evening together, which goes awry; Lily and Marshall become clingy and dependent, prompting Barney and Robin to "break up" with them. Eventually, Barney and Robin realize they miss Lily and Marshall, and they all profess their desire to be a foursome. When Barney and Robin's relationship starts to falter, Lily "comes out of retirement" to break them up. She executes an elaborate plan to get them into a big argument; this fails, but they finally realize they don't work as a couple.

The group discovers that Lily has a doppelgänger named Jasmine, a Russian stripper. Lily is especially excited about this and is so enthralled by her stripper twin that she and Marshall get a private dance. At the end of the night, Lily switches place with Jasmine and dances with much difficulty on stage, eventually falling into the crowd, to Marshall's horror.

During the sixth season, Marshall and Lily embark on the journey to conceive a child. Initial attempts prove unsuccessful, leading to concerns about their ability to conceive. However, in the season finale, Lily learns that she is finally pregnant. At the end of the seventh season, she gives birth to a son, Marvin.

In the eighth season, Lily takes a job as an art consultant to a millionaire called "The Captain", who eventually offers to move her to Italy. Despite initially turning down the promotion due to conflicts with Marshall's job as an environmental lawyer, Lily ultimately decides to accept it. Marshall persuades her to take the opportunity, and the couple begins preparations for their move to Rome. In the season finale, Marshall accepts a judgeship without telling her, putting her plans in jeopardy.

During the final season, set during the weekend of Barney and Robin's wedding, Lily learns of Marshall's new job, and they get into a huge fight. She storms out, but returns and reconciles with Marshall upon learning that she is pregnant. Marshall turns the job down and agrees to go to Italy with her. A flash forward scene reveals that Lily gives birth to a girl, Daisy.

On the day of the wedding, Lily and Marshall renew their vows to each other.

The series finale, "Last Forever", reveals that, a few years later, Lily gives birth to a third child, a baby girl whose name is unknown. Even as the group drifts apart over the years, Lily is there for all the important moments of their lives: Robin and Barney's divorce, the birth of Barney's daughter and that of Ted's two children, and Ted's wedding to The Mother (whose real name is Tracy McConnell). She remains happily married to Marshall, who eventually becomes a State Supreme Court judge.

== Reception ==
Alyson Hannigan won the People's Choice Award for Favorite TV Comedy Actress in 2010 and 2012 for this role. She was nominated for the same award in 2011, too. In 2014, Alyson Hannigan and Cobie Smulders were also nominated for Favorite TV Gal Pals for their characters Lily Aldrin and Robin Scherbatsky.
