= The Window (How I Met Your Mother) =

- How I Met Your Mother episode
- Episode no.: Season 5 Episode 10
- Directed by: Pamela Fryman
- Written by: Joe Kelly
- Production code: 5ALH11
- Original air date: December 7, 2009

Guest appearances
- JoAnna Garcia as Maggie; Jamie Kaler as Jim; Alec Medlock as Waiter; Barbara Perry as Mrs. Douglas; Matthew Moy as Louis; Marieve Herington as Betty; George Finn as Jamie; Jay Lay as Nicest Guy in the World; Michael Spellman as Adam

Episode chronology
← Previous "Slapsgiving 2: Revenge of the Slap"	Next → "Last Cigarette Ever"
- How I Met Your Mother season 5

"The Window" is the tenth episode of the fifth season of the CBS situation comedy How I Met Your Mother and 98th episode overall. It aired on Monday, December 7, 2009.

== Plot ==
Marshall stops by Ted's apartment with a box of childhood memorabilia from his mother. Ted receives a call from an old woman telling him "the window is open", and races over to a woman's apartment a few blocks away. Later at MacLaren's, Ted explains that "the window" was the window of opportunity to date a woman named Maggie (JoAnna Garcia), who followed up every long-term relationship with a very short break, and then an even-longer relationship.

Ted had known Maggie, the "ultimate girl next door", since college, but she has always quickly found a new boyfriend after being single. After several failed attempts Ted begged Maggie's neighbor, Mrs. Douglas, to tell him the moment she was single again. Ted arranges to meet her at the bar, and is determined not to screw up this time to make sure she comes in contact with as few other men as possible, even ordering her a taxi with a female driver. Robin reminds Ted he still has to teach his evening class, and he is forced to leave Maggie with Marshall and Lily.

While his class counsels Ted on finding love, Marshall rifles through his childhood belongings at the bar. He finds a letter to himself from 1993. The rat-tailed, overalls-wearing 15-year-old insists that Future Marshall get an expensive vehicle, a hot wife, and that he never "sell out". Marshall mournfully reflects that his job at Goliath National Bank is the ultimate sell-out. He leaves MacLaren's, and Lily chases after him, leaving Maggie with Robin. Under Robin's watch, a coworker of Maggie's, named Jim, slips into the booth. Robin shamelessly flirts with Jim and butts in on his invitation to take Maggie to an art show, trying to keep him distracted. Robin passes Maggie off to Barney, who has dared himself to get laid wearing Marshall's old overalls. Ted races back to the bar, only to face Jim and Barney, who both want Maggie.

Lily heads to GNB, thinking Marshall is about to quit his job, but upon further inspection of the letter, she finds another thing that young Marshall was proud of: his ability to dunk a basketball. On the GNB basketball court, Marshall explains how sad he is to have never reached his dreams, but Lily insists that he has led a wonderful life. He attempts to dunk and injures himself. Lily offers to make it up to him and have sex in his office, but Marshall, unable to move, suggests instead they have sex right there on the court.

Robin covertly sends Maggie back to her apartment while the three men bicker over who should get first crack at Maggie. They race to her apartment door, and they find she has reunited with her childhood neighbor Adam, "the guy next door". Future Ted briefly retells their long-standing romance, the second-greatest love story he's ever heard, and flashes forward to their married bliss. When Ted exits the apartment building, he tells Barney he's ready to find true love again. Barney then sleeps with the old woman in Maggie's building to complete his overalls challenge.

Marshall returns to the bar to write a letter to himself 29 years further in the future. In the letter, he makes a small request for his future self to let him know if time travel exists. Lily returns to the booth with a free plate of hot wings, which she says someone "sent back" because they were too hot. Marshall finishes the letter, telling Future Marshall that so long as he is still with Lily he will be doing all right. As it turns out, an older version of Marshall is on the other side of the bar, who apologizes to Wendy the Waitress for sending the wings back, saying he "already had some wings earlier... much earlier".

== Critical response ==
The A.V. Club gave the episode B+ rating, with B reader rating.

IGN rated the episode 7.4 out of 10.

As of June 2025, it is rated 110 out of 208 episodes of How I Met Your Mother on IMDb.
