= Slapsgiving 3: Slappointment in Slapmarra =

- How I Met Your Mother episode
- Episode no.: Season 9 Episode 14
- Directed by: Pamela Fryman
- Written by: Carter Bays; Craig Thomas
- Original air date: January 13, 2014

Guest appearances
- Boyz II Men as themselves; Nazanin Boniadi as Nora; Stacy Keibler as Karina the Hot Bartender; April Bowlby as Meg; Katie Walder as Shannon; Eva Amurri as Shelly; Joe Nieves as Carl

Episode chronology
← Previous "Bass Player Wanted"	Next → "Unpause"
- How I Met Your Mother season 9

"Slapsgiving 3: Slappointment in Slapmarra" is the fourteenth episode of the ninth season of the CBS sitcom How I Met Your Mother, and the 198th episode overall. The episode's name is a reference to "The Appointment in Samarra", a fable by W. Somerset Maugham based on an ancient Mesopotamian story about the inevitability of death.

== Plot ==
Picking up where "Bass Player Wanted" left off, at 1 a.m on Sunday, 17 hours before the wedding, Marshall is about to slap Barney when Future Ted says there is a back story to this slap. A few weeks earlier at MacLaren's Bar, Marshall tells Barney that he wants the next slap from the slap bet to be as painful as humanly possible. Barney counters that he is now immune to all of Marshall's torments.

Marshall proceeds to tell Barney that he went to seek "special training" for the next slap, which he describes as happening sometime in the future. First, he learned from a kid at a martial arts training center about the existence of the "Slap of a Million Exploding Suns", and that he needed to visit three masters to learn this skill. He traveled to Shanghai for a year to learn the speed component from "The Cruel Tutelage of Red Bird", to the Slap Mountain to learn the strength component from "The Punishing Scholarship of White Flower" and to Cleveland to learn the accuracy component from "The Some-Might-Call-It-Nitpicky-But-It’s-Really-Just-Thorough Schooling of the Calligrapher".

The training from Red Bird (in the likeness of Robin) included Marshall practicing with a fabled "slapping tree" in Gongqing Forest Park, a tree that slaps back with its branches. White Flower (in the likeness of Lily) instructed Marshall to get slapped by several of Barney's former conquests so he can harness their anger to give him the strength for his slap. When visiting the Calligrapher (in the likeness of Ted), Marshall tried to save him from choking by slapping his back, but without learning accuracy yet, he slapped the Calligrapher's heart right out of him. Marshall ends his story complaining that he never got to finish his training.

Flashing forward to the wedding weekend, Barney runs into woods in panic just before Marshall's hand makes contact with his face. The gang finally catches up to him, and Marshall tells Barney that the Calligrapher did in fact teach him the secret to accuracy while dying on the floor, and that his training is complete. Barney says that he is also ready, and Marshall slaps Barney. Marshall reminds Barney that there is one slap remaining in the slap bet.

== Production ==
What happens when you combine Boyz II Men and a favorite original song from our series? Magic, that's what. We had a lot of fun bringing [Boyz II Men] into the studio and onto our set to make the end of this episode so damn funny. What other show can pull off a whole Kill Bill-inspired episode, centered around one character slapping the other in the face as hard as he can?

— Andy Gowan, How I Met Your Mother music supervisor

== Critical reception ==
Bill Kuchman of Popculturology said that despite the episode not advancing the show's story or featuring The Mother, "it was still a highlight of Season 9" thanks to "Marshall finally [being] reunited with Lily, Ted, Robin and Barney." Kuchman also noted that HIMYM may have created another timeline error, with Marshall yelling "That's four!" after slapping Barney in both this episode and in the Season 7 episode Disaster Averted. Except there was no error as there were two slaps remaining and Marshall said "One more!" shortly after saying "That's four!"

The A.V. Club's Donna Bowman graded the episode an A−.

Max Nicholson of IGN gave the episode 6.5/10, saying it delivered a fun and concise storyline that effectively set up future events.

=== Controversy ===
The episode generated criticism that the actors were in "yellow face", and were depicting Asian stereotypes and accents. While the episode was airing, #HowIMetYourRacism became a trending topic on Twitter. In response, show co-creator Carter Bays posted on Twitter that they were trying to pay homage to the kung fu movies that they grew up on and apologized to people who were offended.
