= Ted Mosby, Architect =

- How I Met Your Mother episode
- Episode no.: Season 2 Episode 4
- Directed by: Pamela Fryman
- Written by: Kristin Newman
- Production code: 2ALH04
- Original air date: October 9, 2006

Guest appearances
- Joe Manganiello as Brad; Dawn Olivieri as Anna; Ryan O'Connor as Chet

Episode chronology
← Previous "Brunch"	Next → "World's Greatest Couple"
- How I Met Your Mother season 2

"Ted Mosby, Architect" is the fourth episode in the second season of the television series How I Met Your Mother. It originally aired on October 9, 2006 on CBS.

== Plot ==
After Ted and Robin have their first fight as a couple, Ted meets Marshall and Barney at MacLaren's while Robin meets Lily in a nail salon. At work that day, Ted's boss unveiled a design for a skyscraper which is remarkably phallic, but when he tried to tell Robin about it, she said that she did not want to hear about his job because it is dull compared to hers. She said that one of his favorite films, Field of Dreams, is stupid, which also upset him. Lily explains to Robin that listening is essential to an relationship even if she is uninterested in Ted's work. Marshall asks Ted to join him at a law school party, but Ted has to return to work. Barney tells him that his job is not dull: women think that architects are hot, and Ted needs to present his career with the right attitude. As the three leave for their evening plans, Ted approaches a woman at the bar and asks her what she thinks about architects. She tells them she thinks architects are sexy, and they begin chatting.

Robin heads to the bar with Lily to apologize to Ted, but he is not there. Robin asks the bartender about Ted, and a woman at the bar tells her that he left with her friend to go to Marshall's law school party. Robin is calm and happy that Ted found someone to talk to about architecture so she does not have to hear it. Lily can't believe that Robin is not jealous that Ted is hitting on other women. Robin says she is picturing the other woman as unattractive, but when her friend says she is a kickboxing instructor and looks excellent, Robin decides to go to the party to check on Ted. Lily and Robin go to the law school party and ask around for Ted. The party's host, Brad, speaks reverently of Ted Mosby, the Architect, but says he left with his date and Marshall to dance at a club. Upset that Ted, who hates clubs, would dance with another woman, Robin tries calling him to apologize. When Ted does not answer his phone, Robin calls Marshall, who tells her that Ted is at work. Shocked that Marshall lied to her, Robin realizes that Ted is cheating on her.

At the club, the bouncer (who also refers to "Ted Mosby the Architect") tells them that Ted left with his date to go to her apartment across the street. After a bribe from her clutch purse, the bouncer tells Robin where Ted's date lives and the girls go to the apartment. Finding the door unlocked, they sneak in and discover Barney in the woman's bed. Robin asks where Ted is, and Barney replies that Ted is at work. Barney then tells them that he has been pretending to be Ted all night, introducing himself as "Ted Mosby, Architect" to the woman at MacLaren's after Ted left. Lily reassures Robin that everything is okay because Ted is not cheating on her, but Robin says she hates how crazy and paranoid she has been acting. Lily tells her that people act crazy and paranoid in relationships, and she misses those feelings. Leaving his standard goodbye letter for the woman he just had sex with, Barney, Robin, and Lily flee.

Robin brings donuts and coffee to Ted at work, apologizes for their fight, and tells him that she wants to be the person to whom he complains about work. Ted shows her an alternate design for the skyscraper that he has been working on, and Future Ted tells his kids that it was the first time he had ever shown his drawings to someone; the skyscraper later ended up being built, and he had pointed it out to them when they had previously visited Spokane as a family.

The woman Barney slept with finds his goodbye letter on the bed. In it, Barney pretends to be a ghost who could only spend a day on Earth every 10 years and "chose to spend it with [her]." However, he slips up as he signs the letter "Barney" (when she thinks he is Ted), leaving the girl utterly confused.

== Critical response ==
IGN gave the episode 8.8 out of 10.
