= Something Blue (How I Met Your Mother) =

- How I Met Your Mother episode
- Episode no.: Season 2 Episode 22
- Directed by: Pamela Fryman
- Written by: Craig Thomas & Carter Bays
- Production code: 2ALH22
- Original air date: May 14, 2007

Guest appearances
- K Callan as Grandma Lois; Marshall Manesh as Ranjit; Scoot McNairy as Fast Food Worker

Episode chronology
| ← Previous "Something Borrowed" | Next → "Wait for It" |
- How I Met Your Mother season 2

"Something Blue" is the 22nd and final episode in the second season of the television series How I Met Your Mother. It explores the aftermath of Marshall and Lily's wedding, with the title referring to the blue French horn that Ted stole. It originally aired on CBS on May 14, 2007.

== Plot ==
Marshall and Lily's wedding reception is in full swing, but they cannot eat there because food is being taken right out from under them while relatives congratulating them just before they can get a bite. Lily also gets drunk and misses in her attempt to feed Marshall some cake. When they finally get to the limo to their honeymoon, which is driven by Ranjit, Marshall asks to stop at a fast-food restaurant so that they can get something to eat. At the restaurant, Marshall begins to fully realize that Lily is his wife, and his realization makes him very happy.

At the reception, Ted and Robin begin discussing a big announcement, and when Barney overhears, he harasses them until they relent, telling him of what happened two weeks before the wedding.

On their first anniversary, Ted and Robin went to the restaurant where they had their first date. When they received two complementary glasses of champagne, Robin discovered an engagement ring at the bottom of the glass, and began to think that Ted was proposing to her. Barney reacts in horror at the thought they might marry, and Ted reveals Robin reacted with similar horror. The proposal was actually meant for a couple at another table; when the mix-up was clarified, the other woman accepted, but Robin's horror and subsequent relief unearthed unresolved issues between Ted and her. They asked each other where they see themselves five years from now: Ted wanted to get married, and Robin wanted to travel the world as a journalist, going to places such as Argentina, Tokyo or Paris. This made Ted question whether their relationship had any future at all.

The restaurant owner recognized Ted as the man who stole his blue French horn. Ted tried to escape, but ran into a waiter, getting food all over him and Robin. The restaurant owner forced Ted to return the blue French horn in order to get his credit card and driver's license back. They went to Robin's apartment to discuss their respective life passions. Ted expresses that he shares Robin's desire to travel the world, saying that he wished he had studied abroad for a year while at college and believing that having just finished a big project at work (the Seattle project), would allow him to finally travel. Barney is again disgusted by this idea, not on the terms of their relationship, but due to concerns of him being lonely in New York and Argentina being economically unstable. While discussing the issue of kids, Robin told Ted that she does not want to have kids, but would have his if she had no other choice. Before having sex, they realized that neither of them have a condom and initially decided to hold off, but then decided to take the risk. At this point, a terrified Barney believes that Robin is pregnant with Ted's child. His fears seem confirmed when he sees Robin catching the bouquet and making a point of drinking water rather than alcohol.

Ted and Robin then reveal that after they had sex that night, they realized that their relationship was not heading in a direction either of them wanted to follow, and that they could no longer pretend that these issues did not matter to them. After exactly a year of dating, Ted and Robin broke up on amicable terms. This further stuns Barney, who wondered why he had not heard. Through a flashback to the episode "Showdown", they explain that they decided to hold off announcing the breakup because of Lily and Marshall's impending wedding. As Robin is asked by a little boy for a dance at the wedding reception, Future Ted then reveals that they eventually both got what they wanted out of life; Robin went on to travel the world, while Ted met his future wife.

Ted then gets a drink from the bar and a cigar from Barney, who tells him that even though he had always joked about him and Robin breaking up, he thought that they were a good couple. Ted agrees, but says that they were not headed in the same direction, and needs to take a break from searching for "The One" for a while, telling Barney that he will need him as a wingman again. An overjoyed Barney declares the summer is going to be "Legen—wait for it..."

== Critical response ==
In his episode review at TV Squad Joel Keller gave the episode a 7, their highest rating.

Staci Krause of IGN gave the episode 9.3 out of 10.
