= How Lily Stole Christmas =

- How I Met Your Mother episode
- Episode no.: Season 2 Episode 11
- Directed by: Pamela Fryman
- Written by: Brenda Hsueh
- Production code: 2ALH12
- Original air date: December 11, 2006

Guest appearances
- Harry Groener as Clint; Michael Gross as Mr Mosby (voice); Cristine Rose as Mrs Mosby; Moon Zappa as Stacy; Wayne Knight as Lily's Landlord (voice, uncredited)

Episode chronology
← Previous "Single Stamina"	Next → "First Time in New York"
- How I Met Your Mother season 2

"How Lily Stole Christmas" is the 11th episode in the second season of the television series How I Met Your Mother. It originally aired on December 11, 2006 on CBS.

== Plot ==
Ted decides spend Christmas in his home this year with "his other family", not wanting to spend it with his mom and her new boyfriend, Clint; or his dad and his new "girlfriend", microbrewing; or his super-religious cousin, Stacy, in Staten Island. While Lily decorates his apartment, Marshall leaves for the law library to finish one last paper that is due that day. He refuses to look at any of the decorations as he leaves because he believes that the "winter wonderland" will be his reward for finishing the paper. After he leaves, Lily finds the old answering machine that was unplugged after Lily and Marshall broke up. Lily plays messages that are still on it, and hears a message from Ted to Marshall telling him to get over Lily. In this message, Ted calls Lily "a very, very bad word" which is substituted in Future Ted's re-telling of the story with the word "grinch".

Lily asks why Ted would call her that word, and Ted reveals that he was trying to get Marshall to stop idolizing Lily even after they had split during the summer, and told Marshall at the time if he did not stop putting her up on a pedestal, he would never get over her. Ted asked Marshall to tell him one thing wrong with Lily. Finally, Marshall gave in and he followed with making jokes about Lily along with Ted and Barney at the bar. Ted tells Lily that he was just trying to help Marshall and he refuses to apologize to Lily because she was "kind of a grinch".

At the bar, Ted is telling Robin and a progressively ill Barney about what happened, and realizes that he has to apologize to Lily. Ted brings a beer back up to the apartment to offer as an apology. When he opens the door, he finds that Lily has taken all the Christmas decorations away from their apartment. Wanting to make sure the winter wonderland will be there when Marshall gets back, Ted tries to call Lily but with no result. As Robin and a very sick Barney stack at the apartment, Ted decides to go to Lily's apartment to apologize. He tricks her into thinking he is the pizza delivery guy so he is able to get her to open the door to her tiny, crappy, cramped NY apartment. He says he is sorry that he called her a "grinch", but Lily works out that he is faking an apology, and is clearly still angry with her. She asks Ted why he will not forgive her when she has already apologized to Marshall. He replies that she never apologized to him, and that her abrupt departure and lack of contact had hurt him as well. He and Lily get into another argument, when her super, who lives above her, cuts off her apartment's power. Ted then tells Lily that she can take the decorations back to his and Marshall's apartment because he is going to visit Stacy's family in Staten Island. In the meantime, Robin insists upon taking care of Barney, who has caught a terrible cold. He whines about wearing sweatpants, not getting ice cream for dinner, and everything else he can until Robin spikes his tea with codeine, making him fall asleep.

Marshall comes back home to the apartment, finding the winter wonderland intact and no knowledge of what happened earlier in the day. He reveals he blew off his paper and spent hours tracking down his gift for Lily. He went to the post office and discovered that the package was already on the truck headed to Poughkeepsie, so ran the truck down to get the package back. He also decided to help the driver deliver all of the packages on his route in time for Christmas. Lily opens her package to find an Easy-Bake Oven, something she has wanted since childhood, but never got because her feminist mom did not want her to conform to traditional gender roles, and gave her a Lego set instead. Since she has no idea how Marshall knew about her preferred item, he admits learning about it from Ted, to whom Lily told her story back in college. This makes her feel guilty for what she did.

At Stacy's house, Ted is having a miserable time when Lily, Robin, Marshall and Barney arrive at the door with an apology beer for Ted. Ted tells Stacy that it is carolers to keep her from coming to the door. While the other three sing, Lily says she is sick of apologizing and the two agree to skip straight to the forgiveness. Ted and the group take off after Stacy's children overhear Lily say she "was kind of a grinch", and they all begin to cheer "grinch!" over and over, much to their parents' horror.

== Critical response ==
Joel Keller of TV Squad said it was a good episode, and an improvement over the previous year's New Year's Eve episode.
