= Swarley =

- How I Met Your Mother episode
- Episode no.: Season 2 Episode 7
- Directed by: Pamela Fryman
- Written by: Greg Malins
- Production code: 2ALH07
- Original air date: November 6, 2006

Guest appearances
- Tom Lenk as Scott; Morena Baccarin as Chloe

Episode chronology
← Previous "Aldrin Justice"	Next → "Atlantic City"
- How I Met Your Mother season 2

"Swarley" is the seventh episode in the second season of the television series How I Met Your Mother. It originally aired on November 6, 2006 on CBS.

The name "Swarley" is taken from an in-episode joke. A coffee shop barista mistakenly hears Barney's name as "Swarley" and writes it on his cup. This leads to a running gag in which everyone mercilessly refers to Barney as "Swarley" despite his protests. This culminates to the point of the entire bar shouting "Swarley" when he enters, as a callback to the sitcom Cheers.

The episode reunites Marshall and Lily as a couple. It received positive reviews from critics.

== Plot ==
The men go to a coffee shop to find out if hanging out at a coffee shop is as fun as hanging out at a bar (which they conclude it is not), where Ted points out that Chloe, the woman working there, has drawn a heart next to Marshall's name on his cup. Ted insists that Chloe has a crush on Marshall because she always laughs at his bad joke about how they fit a pumpkin into a pumpkin-flavored latte. She has not added hearts on Ted's or Barney's cups, but has written Barney's name as "Swarley", prompting everyone to call him the name for the duration of the episode. Barney protests, but variations on the nickname become a running gag throughout the episode.

Ted then proceeds to teach Marshall to charm Chloe to go out with him. As Marshall leaves, his name is called for an unordered pumpkin latte on which Chloe has written her number. Later, when Marshall introduces Chloe to Ted and Barney at the bar, they tell him that she has the "crazy eyes", an indicator of future mental instability. Both Ted and Barney give Marshall examples of their experiences with "crazy eyes", but Marshall shrugs it off. The next day, as Marshall is taking a test, he receives a call from Chloe who says that she is being followed by a hunchback with a limp. Later, Marshall takes Chloe back to his apartment and suspects that she broke a picture of him and Lily that was sitting on the end table, and decides to look into her eyes to see whether she is crazy or not. However, to Marshall and Chloe's surprise, Lily – who has been hiding in the apartment – pops out from behind the couch.

Earlier in the week, Lily confided in Robin that she is scared by the idea of Marshall going out on a date with another woman. Despite hearing that Ted believes she has "crazy eyes", Lily wanted to see what Chloe looks like. Lily was the hunchback following Chloe—she was carrying a book bag, then covered herself with a coat to shield herself from the rain hence the hump, and limped because she hit her knee while concentrating on seeing Chloe's face. While visiting Ted and Robin, Lily realized that Marshall had moved the picture of the two of them. She sneaked into the apartment before Marshall brought Chloe home to put it in a more conspicuous place and it broke. While hiding from Marshall and Chloe, she becomes upset and jumps out. Lily introduces herself and leaves the apartment dejected and crying. Marshall follows her out to the steps, leaving Chloe sitting on the sofa.

Marshall realizes that he wants to get back together with Lily and they resume their relationship after six months. The gang first goes to MacLaren's for a drink and then returns upstairs to the apartment, finding it has been ransacked by Chloe who has been searching for her lost keys which are in fact sitting in plain sight on the coffee table in front of where she had been sitting. Marshall points out the keys and Chloe departs, leaving a nonplussed gang and apparently proving the "crazy eyes" theory. As she leaves, Chloe calls Robin "Roland" and Barney tries to use it as an opportunity to stop everyone from calling him "Swarley", to no success.

In the final scene, Barney walks into the bar, everyone shouts "Swarley" referencing the entrance of Norm Peterson from Cheers and he turns and walks out dejectedly as Carl the bartender plays the Cheers theme: "Where Everybody Knows Your Name". The credits are then presented in the same font used on the show Cheers.

== Critical reception ==
Staci Krause of IGN said "the whole Swarley joke had gotten very old" by the end of the episode, although "it was funny for the first ten or so times" and "the homage paid to Cheers was well appreciated". Krause said the animated effects used for the women with 'crazy eyes' was "rather stupid", but that the story came to a "great conclusion" as Lily crying was "one of the best emotional moments this show has ever given us".

Both Digital Spy and Radio Times listed "Swarley" as one of the ten best How I Met Your Mother episodes, with the latter describing it as "one of the most ridiculous episodes of How I Met Your Mother", but claiming "that's exactly why it works".
