= The Leap (How I Met Your Mother) =

- How I Met Your Mother episode
- Episode no.: Season 4 Episode 24
- Directed by: Pamela Fryman
- Written by: Craig Thomas; Carter Bays
- Production code: 4ALH24
- Original air date: May 18, 2009

Guest appearances
- Jayden Lund as Bill; Joel McCrary as Wilkinson; Christine Scott Bennett as Tracey; John Duerler as Johnsen

Episode chronology
← Previous "As Fast as She Can"	Next → "Definitions"
- How I Met Your Mother season 4

"The Leap" is the 24th and final episode of season 4 of the How I Met Your Mother TV series and 88th overall. It originally aired on May 18, 2009.

== Plot ==
As Ted pulls an all-nighter in an attempt to win his firm a contract, Marshall attempts to lure Ted to the roof for a surprise 31st birthday party. An upset Marshall attempts to jump from their apartment roof to the neighboring building's roof (beautifully furnished with a hot tub), about seven feet away, but fails to get the courage to jump like previous times. Lily tries to dissuade him by falsely claiming that she is pregnant, resulting in Marshall saying that he noticed Lily gaining weight, and Lily storming off afterwards.

While Ted is hard at work, the goat scuttles through the apartment. After Ted repeatedly takes a wash-cloth away from the animal, the goat mauls Ted, and he is sent to the hospital. When he shows up to his restaurant design meeting, his clients decide to go with Swedish avant-garde architecture collective Sven, instead of him.

Barney decides to confess his feelings for Robin, but before he can say anything, she says that she loves him. He quickly reacts by saying they should just be friends, and picks up a random girl at the party. Lily then tells him that Robin overheard him using a suit analogy to ask for Ted's blessing to pursue her, and was worried about what to do. She discussed it with Lily and Marshall (who reveal they had known for months), who advised her to "Mosby" Barney, telling him she loves him right away, just like Ted did. A disappointed Barney confronts Robin at the hospital. She admits to "Mosbying" him, but then tries to do it again, until the two confess their complicated feelings for each other and kiss. After this, they decide to discuss it later.

Lily tells Ted that maybe he should just "take the leap" and do what the world seems to want him to do, Marshall takes the advice literally, and leaps from the roof to the other building, followed by the rest of the gang. Cheered on by his friends, Ted makes the leap to the other building alongside them and later accepts the professor job at the University. Future Ted reveals to his kids that the Mother was a student at the first class he taught there.

== Production ==
This episode was filmed out of order in order to allow Alyson Hannigan, who was about to begin her maternity leave, to appear.

== Critical response ==
Donna Bowman of The A.V. Club graded the episode B+.

"Prophets" by A.C. Newman features at the start and the end of the episode. Greg Chow on the Rolling Stone website complimented the song choice, describing it as a "transitional [song] of triumph" which "pretty much sums up Ted in a nutshell". It was also mentioned in an article in The Hollywood Reporter.
