= Spoiler Alert (How I Met Your Mother) =

- How I Met Your Mother episode
- Episode no.: Season 3 Episode 8
- Directed by: Pamela Fryman
- Written by: Stephen Lloyd
- Production code: 3ALH08
- Original air date: November 12, 2007

Guest appearances
- Lindsay Price as Cathy; Ron Butler as Proctor

Episode chronology
← Previous "Dowisetrepla"	Next → "Slapsgiving"
- How I Met Your Mother season 3

"Spoiler Alert" is the eighth episode of the third season of the American television series How I Met Your Mother and the 52nd episode overall. It originally aired on CBS on November 12, 2007. The episode was directed by Pamela Fryman and written by Stephen Lloyd.

The episode centers on Ted discovering an irritating habit of his new girlfriend Cathy, which leads the group to point out previously unnoticed flaws in one another. A parallel storyline follows Marshall as he tries to retrieve the results of his bar examination. The episode received generally positive reviews, with The A.V. Club giving it a B grade and IGN rating it 8.6 out of 10.

== Plot ==
Ted thinks that he has found the perfect girl, Cathy (Lindsay Price) and decides to take her to dinner with the gang. During the dinner, Ted can see the group's hate for Cathy and their annoyance whenever she speaks to them. At first they refuse to give a reason so as not to "spoil" her for him, but eventually Marshall tells him that she talks too much. Ted refuses to believe it, but when Robin insists that he think about the dinner, Ted realizes that Cathy did not allow the gang to answer her questions and continued speaking over them. Now that Ted knows, he cannot stand her garrulousness. The five friends then let slip each other's flaws until all are "spoiled,” and thus are more annoying to those who had previously not noticed the flaws:

- Lily chewing everything, even cotton candy, loudly (pointed out by Ted to Marshall)
- Ted overcorrecting people on minuscule things (pointed out by Lily to Robin)
- Robin overusing and misusing the word "literally" (pointed out by Ted)
- Marshall singing about whatever he is doing at the moment, or nonsense (pointed out by Robin to Lily)
- Barney speaking in a falsetto, using catchphrases and spacing out when his friends are talking to him (pointed out by Marshall, Robin and Ted to Barney, but ignored by Barney by his spacing out).

Whenever one or more of the group has these quirks pointed out to them, the sound of glass shattering is heard, representing the shattering of their illusions about one another.

Meanwhile, Marshall's bar exam results have been released, but he cannot remember the password he needs to retrieve the results online (thus making him wait for three months for a notification by mail). Barney offers to help but this is only a ruse to make him watch a video of a dog pooping on a baby – something Marshall is furious at him for putting a disgusting video over his friend's future, and, with Marshall angry at Barney and the whole gang annoyed with one another, the arguments reach a climax. The argument is halted when the group mockingly sings one of Marshall's "nonsense" songs (Apple Orchard Banana Cat Dance 8 6 6 3); the song was actually a mnemonic device to help Marshall remember his password (aobcd8663 – it is not shown if it has upper or lower case letters) for the bar exam results website. He enters it and discovers that he has passed the bar exam and is now a lawyer. The group then celebrates with champagne at MacLaren's with each sliding back into their bad habits (Marshall singing his own praises, Robin using "literally" incorrectly, Lily crunching loudly on bar snacks, Ted making a correction on a comment and Barney saying "law-suit up!" in a high-pitched voice) which they all let go.

Three years later, Ted runs into Cathy with her deaf fiancé Daniel, and uses sign language to announce how Cathy talks too much. Even though the man is deaf and it does not affect him, Ted has "spoiled" Cathy to Daniel, and a subtitle displays "(Glass Shattering)" as Ted walks away and Daniel looks on in utter despair. We do not know the fate of Cathy and Daniel.

== Critical response ==
Donna Bowman of The A.V. Club gave the episode a B rating.

IGN rated the episode 8.6 out of 10.

Omar G of Television Without Pity rated the episode A−.
