= Unpause =

- How I Met Your Mother episode
- Episode no.: Season 9 Episode 15
- Directed by: Pamela Fryman
- Written by: Chris Harris
- Original air date: January 20, 2014

Episode chronology
← Previous "Slapsgiving 3: Slappointment in Slapmarra"	Next → "How Your Mother Met Me"
- How I Met Your Mother season 9

"Unpause" is the fifteenth episode of the ninth season of the CBS sitcom How I Met Your Mother, and the 199th episode overall. In this episode, Ted's future children's names are finally revealed; the daughter's name is Penny and the son is Luke.

== Plot ==
In 2017, Ted's wife goes into labor during their stay at the Farhampton Inn, where they were babymooning. Ted tells his wife that he hopes the baby arrives soon due to his mother's rule that "Nothing good happens after 2am". However, his wife says she does not believe the rule and they prepare to leave for the hospital.

Four years earlier at exactly 2:01 am, 16 hours before the wedding, the gang has a last round of drinks before heading to bed. Marshall keeps ordering drinks to stall his inevitable confrontation with Lily over his new job and the plan to go to Italy. He also uses the opportunity to irritate Ted with the childhood items he got from Mrs. Mosby (one of which being a stuffed turtle toy with a voice recording), but Lily insists they leave. When Marshall learns Lily wants to have the fight after they have sex, he attempts to prolong their lovemaking as much as possible.

Just as Ted, Robin, and Barney are ready to call it a night, Barney reveals embarrassing information about himself. Previously, the gang had thought that Barney maxed out at "Jabba drunk", where he talked like Jabba the Hutt from Star Wars. However, Ted and Robin realize the drinks have brought Barney into a drunken state where he will truthfully answer any question, giving them the opportunity to ask anything they've always wanted to know about him. As Ted and Robin ask Barney questions, Barney makes a number of admissions such as: kissing Mrs. Mosby (but never got further), spending a "crapload" each year on suits, and Robin's family is incredibly wealthy, which angers Ted because he paid for everything during their relationship and she never did, while Robin defends herself by saying it belongs to her family and not her. Robin tries several times to find out why he keeps saying 'ring bear' instead of 'ring bearer' and if there is actually going to be a bear at the wedding. After a few failed attempts, Barney tells Robin that there will be a ring-bearer, whose name is Trevor Hudson, and Barney worked with his mother. Unknown to Robin, an animal keeper is later seen walking with an unseen Trevor Hudson on a chain, making it unclear whether Trevor is indeed a bear or an aggressive man.

Ted has one special question of his own: about Barney's real job, given that he has always scoffed the gang by saying "please" when asked what he does for a living. When Barney still answers the same, Ted guesses that 'please' could actually be referring to the job and asks for more information. Barney reminds them of how he transformed from a hippie to his present state after a yuppie named Greg took his girlfriend, Shannon, from him back in 1998, and needed help transitioning fully into the corporate world. After tracking down Greg, who failed to recognize him, Barney accepted a lucrative job offer from Greg where he is simply responsible for signing any legally questionable documents put in front of him. The "Please" remark is explained as "Provide Legal Exculpation And Sign Everything." Ted and Robin are horrified, pointing out that Barney could be set up like another employee who was arrested the day he applied. Barney tells them the job was part of his master plan: he is actually working with the Justice Department to take down Greg for his company's crimes (and finally score his revenge for what Greg did to him years ago). Future Ted says that a few months after the wedding, Barney revealed his true identity to Greg as FBI agents arrest him on the spot. Satisfied with the questioning, Robin says goodbye to Barney for the last time before the ceremony. When Ted asks how Barney truly feels about finally getting married, Barney confirms he is nervous, but knows Robin is part of what makes him awesome and reaffirms his love for her.

Meanwhile, Lily goes to sleep exhausted from the lovemaking but wakes up after Marshall steps on Ted's turtle toy and unpauses their fight. During their fight, Lily insists her art career was her dream and expresses her resentment at Marshall for not even consulting her about taking the judgeship. Marshall downplays her art career as a hobby and states being a judge is a great opportunity. When Lily accuses him of being more selfish to her than she ever was to him, Marshall angrily reminds her of the time she left him seven years ago to pursue an art fellowship in San Francisco. He asks if he, Marvin, and their future children are just consolation prizes to her. Upset by the suggestion, Lily leaves and calls up an unknown person to pick her up from the inn.

In another flash-forward to 2017, the Mosby family is leaving for hospital so the mother can give birth to the second child. Ted tells his wife that he and Penny (their infant daughter) are proud of her, revealing his daughter's name to the audience for the first time. As the Mosbys depart, Future Ted remarks: "Two AM. It's a good rule. But every rule has an exception, and for us that exception was you, Luke," referring to his son.

== Critical reception ==
Bill Kuchman of Popculturology praised the episode for having three strong storylines, saying that "'Unpause' may have contained one of the series' most devastating moments," referring to the fight between Marshall and Lily. Kuchman also noted that Penny, the name of Ted's daughter, possibly came from the Season 2 episode Lucky Penny, noting that Ted missed a flight to a job interview thanks to a series of events caused by a penny he found in the street. "Had Ted moved away all those years ago, he would have never met The Mother. Thanks to that lucky penny, Ted was in the right place at the right time".

Donna Bowman of The A.V. Club graded the episode a B+.

Max Nicholson of IGN gave the episode 8.5/10, saying it brought the goods, including answers to two big mysteries.
