= Monday Night Football (How I Met Your Mother) =

- How I Met Your Mother episode
- Episode no.: Season 2 Episode 14
- Directed by: Rob Greenberg
- Written by: Carter Bays; Craig Thomas
- Production code: 2ALH13
- Original air date: February 5, 2007

Guest appearances
- Lyndsy Fonseca as Daughter; Charlene Amoia as Wendy the Waitress; Joe Nieves as Carl; Emmitt Smith as Himself; Nicholas Roget-King as Doug; David Henrie as Son; Monique Edwards as Producer; John Ducey as Kevin; Robert Michael Morris as Lou

Episode chronology
← Previous "Columns"	Next → "Lucky Penny"
- How I Met Your Mother season 2

"Monday Night Football" is the 14th episode in the second season of the television series How I Met Your Mother. It originally aired on CBS on February 5, 2007. The episode was written by Carter Bays, and Craig Thomas. It was rated 5.4 out of 10 by Staci Krause of IGN.

== Plot ==
For Ted's favorite holiday, Super Bowl Sunday, he and the gang plan to continue their tradition of watching it together with hot wings. The plans are cut short when they find out a worker at the bar has died, and they reluctantly agree to attend the funeral, out of fear that they will be banned from the bar. The funeral starts at the same time as Super Bowl XLI, so they tape it figuring they will watch it afterwards. The wake lasts too long and they run out of time to watch the game. They plan to not find out the score of the game until they watch it together the next day.

Ted decides to work at home so no one can tell him the score while Barney handcuffs himself to Ted's wall so he cannot find out the score because he has bet a lot of money on the game. Ted constructs a device (the “Sensory Deprivator 5000”) so he can get the wings and not find out the score while he is in the sports bar. After he gets back, he realizes he must go back to get the dipping sauce. At the same time, Barney escapes from Ted's apartment and tries as hard as he can to find the score of the game. He runs into many people, including Emmitt Smith, who have all missed the game, to Barney's frustration.

Robin does the best she can to avoid the media by trying to delay the sports news and by covering her ears. When someone asks why she is acting weird, she uses the excuse of her friend dying and how she could not watch the game because she had to go to the funeral.

Marshall goes to class with Lily for show and tell, where a student threatens to tell the score to Marshall. Marshall asks the kid why he is threatening him and the kid replies that he is in love with Lily. The kid does many things to torment Marshall, such as blackmailing him to give him money. This continues until Marshall gets the kid back by spraying juice on his pants and threatens to tell everyone he wet his pants unless he returns the money.

While Ted is back in the bar getting the sauce, the others find out the score of the game without even watching it. Barney checks the newspaper, Robin hears the winner at the news station, and a janitor has the radio on in the kindergarten, revealing the score of the game to Marshall and Lily.

Marshall, Lily and Robin head to Ted's but do not reveal that they know who won, and Barney promises he will not tell – only to be heard loudly screaming in Marshall's room that he lost every bet, thus ruining the game for everybody since Ted knew who Barney bet on. Robin, Marshall and Lily play it off and pretend that Barney ruined the game for them. Despite this, the five decide to sit down and watch the game anyway and still manage to enjoy themselves as much as ever. Future Ted finishes the story by telling his kids that he does not remember who won or even who played, but he will always remember the evening as a fun one he spent with his friends.

== Critical response ==
Staci Krause of IGN gave this episode a rating of 5.4 out of 10.
