= Single Stamina =

- How I Met Your Mother episode
- Episode no.: Season 2 Episode 10
- Directed by: Pamela Fryman
- Written by: Kristin Newman
- Production code: 2ALH10
- Original air date: November 27, 2006

Guest appearances
- Wayne Brady as James; Gabrielle Richens as Girl at bar with tattoo; Sarah Cahill as Rosa; Megan Mullally as Barney's mother's voice (uncredited)

Episode chronology
← Previous "Slap Bet"	Next → "How Lily Stole Christmas"
- How I Met Your Mother season 2

"Single Stamina" is the tenth episode in the second season of the television series How I Met Your Mother. It originally aired on November 27, 2006 on CBS. The episode was nominated for the GLAAD Media Award for Outstanding Individual Episode.

== Plot ==
It is winter in New York City; Marshall, Lily, Ted, and Robin are in "couples' hibernation mode". Barney tries to get them to go out, but the two couples consistently refuse. Tired of being his own wingman, Barney invites his brother James to town. Ted warns Robin that James is just like Barney, only gay, so she should not be surprised. James arrives and Robin is very surprised to discover that James is black. Robin asks what the backstory is, and it is revealed that the two do not really know it; amongst other things, their mother says that Barney is white because she ate vanilla ice cream when she was pregnant with him, and James is black because she ate chocolate ice cream.

James tells them that they are young people living in New York and that they should go out and have fun. The six of them go out, and James helps Barney pick up a girl with a lower back tattoo. Lily, Marshall, Robin, and Ted note how single people have more "single stamina" than people in couples. While they are discussing whether it is more difficult to pick up a date or to deflect obnoxious flirts, the group notices that James is acting strangely – turning down a lot of guys, complaining about his feet hurting him, and generally acting like the four of them. When they see James text messaging someone, they realize that he must be in a monogamous relationship and they tell Barney. Barney confronts James, grabbing James's phone, which has a picture of James and another man. James tells Barney that the man in the picture is Tom, his fiancé. James then asks Barney to be his best man. An upset Barney rejects James, lamenting the end of single life once gay men start getting married.

The next day, Barney complains to his friends about James' marriage plans. Marshall points out that James' marriage does not have to change things. Ted recalls that he had to support his sister when she married someone he did not like, and suggests that Barney do the same with James. Barney takes James out to a gay club, where he tries to hook a resistant James up with other men. Ted and Marshall are flattered when gay men hit on them, but soon become uncomfortable with their advances. Robin and Lily are excited that they can dance without being groped, but find that they miss the flirtacious attention. When Barney accuses James of abandoning him and their way of life, James stuns Barney by revealing that he and Tom are adopting a baby. Barney is excited that he will be an uncle, and agrees to be James' best man.

A year later, Barney makes a toast at Tom and James' wedding. A recently married Marshall and Lily leave because of the time but Ted and Robin, having broken up at this point, stay at the reception. Barney meets James's son, and promises to take him out on his 21st birthday and show him how to pick up women. The baby is also wearing a suit, which Barney compliments.
