= Slapsgiving 2: Revenge of the Slap =

- How I Met Your Mother episode
- Episode no.: Season 5 Episode 9
- Directed by: Pamela Fryman
- Written by: Jamie Rhonheimer
- Production code: 5ALH09
- Original air date: November 23, 2009

Guest appearances
- Chris Elliott as Mickey Aldrin; Christina Pickles as Rita; Bill Fagerbakke as Marvin Eriksen Sr.; Suzie Plakson as Judy Eriksen; Robert Michael Ryan as Marvin Eriksen Jr.; Ned Rolsma as Marcus Eriksen; Greg Lewis as Mr. Ossias; Charles Chun as Mr. Park

Episode chronology
← Previous "The Playbook"	Next → "The Window"
- How I Met Your Mother season 5

"Slapsgiving 2: Revenge of the Slap" is the ninth episode of the fifth season of the CBS sitcom How I Met Your Mother and 97th episode overall. It aired on November 23, 2009.

== Plot ==
Future Ted describes the Thanksgiving of 2009, when Lily and Marshall invited the gang over to their apartment for dinner. Marshall picked out a turkey, but left it in the cab. Robin and Ted pick it up at the Port Authority, and in gratitude, Marshall bequeaths his fourth slap to them, on the condition they slap before sundown and decide among themselves who gets to slap Barney.

Lily's estranged father Mickey then shows up, surprising and angering Lily. Mickey had been living in his parents' basement, trying to develop his strange board game ideas, halting his parents' plan to move out of the house. Marshall, who comes from a close-knit family, tries to convince Lily to allow her father to have dinner with them. He then accidentally tells Lily that he had met up with Mickey a week ago and invited him over to Thanksgiving. She refuses, but Marshall invites him in anyway, only for Lily walk out the door. As they sit and wait for Lily to return, they play one of Mickey's unsuccessful games, "Diseases". After a part of the game sprays lead paint and horse bile all over the turkey, Marshall kicks him out and looks for Lily. Realizing what it would mean if her father died without seeing him again, they return to have Thanksgiving dinner together.

Ted and Robin playfully argue about who should slap Barney, begging off the honor to each other, but when Robin accepts, Ted gets angry. They then start to argue seriously on who gets to slap him. Barney tries to extend the argument, frightened of being tied to a chair and slapped. Robin gifts the slap to Ted, praising his growth since being left at the altar. Ted then gifts the slap to Robin, as closure to her relationship with Barney. Robin, unable to slap Barney, gifts the slap to Mickey as a welcome to the gang. Mickey then gifts the slap to Lily as an apology for his absentee parenting. Lily can't bring herself to slap Barney, and Marshall explains that he gave out the slap to bring everyone together. Barney is released from the chair, but before he can sit down to dinner, Marshall slaps him in the face, proclaiming, "That's four!".

As a postscript, a commercial is shown of Mickey's new board game, "Slap Bet", recreating the gang's tradition of slaps as a family game.

== Critical response ==
Donna Bowman of The A.V. Club rated the episode as B, saying the episode set itself up for failure by attempting to be a sequel to "Slapsgiving", one of the most popular episodes of the show.

Brian Zoromski of IGN gave the episode 8 out of 10.
