= Katie Walder =

American actress (born 1982)

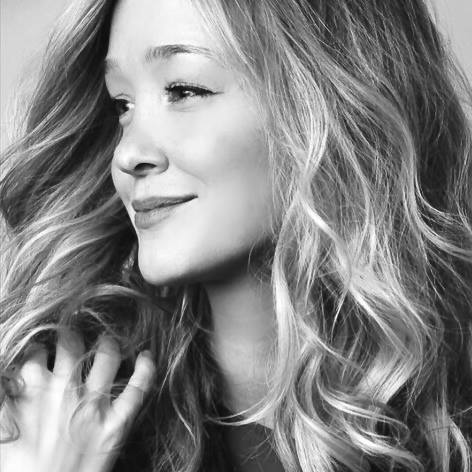
- Occupation: Actress

Katie Walder is an American actress.

== Career ==
Walder is best known for her recurring roles on Gilmore Girls as Janet Billings, How I Met Your Mother as Shannon, and Mad Men as Sherry. She has appeared in over 50 television shows, including New Girl, Franklin & Bash, Fairly Legal, The Good Wife, Supernatural, and Rules of Engagement. In 2007, she played Trevor Wright's girlfriend in the film Shelter. In 2014, she starred in the horror film Come Back to Me. Walder began her career in New York City, performing in stage roles.

== Filmography ==
=== Film ===
Year	Title	Role	Notes
2007	Shelter	Tori	
2007	Safe Harbour	Vanessa Bowles	Video
2007	The Neighbor	Nancy	
2008	Damn You Stephen Hawking	Becky	Video short
2011	Intervention: Cinderella	Cinderella	Short
2013	Broken Up	Katie	Short
2014	Come Back to Me	Sarah	
2015	Kiss Me, Kill Me	Susan Lynnwood	
2017	It Happened in L.A.	Zafu Girl	
2018	The Open House	Allison	
2018	30 Nights	Megan	
TBA	The Energy Specialist	Paige	Completed

=== Television ===
Year	Title	Role	Notes
2002	Law & Order: Special Victims Unit	Carey Thorne	Episode: "Prodigy"
2003–2005	Gilmore Girls	Janet Billings	Recurring role (season 4), guest (season 5)
2005	Cold Case	Beth Adams (1978)	Episode: "Blank Generation"
2006	CSI: Miami	Melinda Carson	Episode: "Shock"
2006	Without a Trace	Claire Norton	Episode: "All for One"
2006–07, 2014	How I Met Your Mother	Shannon	Episodes: "Game Night", "The Yips", "Slapsgiving 3", "Unpause"
2007	McBride: Semper Fi	Kaia Rourke	TV film
2007	Hustle	Janet	Episode: "As One Flew Out of the Cuckoo's Nest, One Flew In"
2007	Saving Grace	Patty	Episode: "A Language of Angels"
2007	Rules of Engagement	Claire	Episode: "Bag Ladies"
2008	Bitter Brew	Brittany	TV film
2009	Trust Me	Jacy	Episode: "What's the Rush?"
2009	The Good Wife	Jennifer Lewis	Episode: "Pilot"
2009	Always and Forever	Lindsay Taylor	TV film
2010	The New Adventures of Old Christine	Hannah	Episode: "A Whale of a Tale"
2010	Chase	Charlene Hughes	Episode: "Repo"
2011	Mad Love	White Whale	Episode: "The Spy Who Loved Me"
2011	Supernatural	Fate / Atropos	Episode: "My Heart Will Go On"
2011	NTSF:SD:SUV::	Reporter	Episode: "Cause for ConCERN"
2011	Man Up!	Sheri	Episode: "Wingmen"
2011, 2013	New Girl	Cheryl	Episodes: "Bad in Bed", "Bachelorette Party"
2012	Cupid, Inc.	Trina	TV film
2012	Fairly Legal	Beth Shepperd	Episode: "Shattered"
2012	Franklin & Bash	Kerry Dutton	Episode: "Jango and Rossi"
2012	The Mentalist	Nancy Sterling	Episode: "Not One Red Cent"
2012	Grimm	Elisha	Episode: "To Protect and Serve Man"
2013, 2015	Mad Men	Sherry	Episodes: "Collaborators", "The Milk and Honey Route"
2015	Kroll Show	Barb	Episode: "The Time of My Life"
2015	It Had to Be You	Tanya	TV film
2016	Skirtchasers	Chelsea Samuels	TV film
2016	Square Roots	Ruth	TV film
2017	Lethal Weapon	Denise Barnes	Episode: "El Gringo Loco"
2017	Scorpion	Jane Addison	Episode: "Who Let the Dog Out"
2017	Thanks for Trying	Dara	TV film
2018	Here and Now	Kelly	Episode: "Hide and Seek"
2018–19	Alexa & Katie	Ms. Rogers	Episodes: "The Play: Parts 1 & 2", "3.2"
2019	How to Get Away with Murder	Kelly Bryce	Episode: "I Hate the World"
2019	Thanks for Trying	Dara	TV miniseries
2022	A Christmas To Treasure	Tipper Tisdale	TV Film
2023	S.W.A.T.	Stacey	Episode: "To Protect And Serve Man"
2023	Station 19	Nancy	Episode: "It's All Gonna Break"
