= Is That a Gun in Your Pocket? =

- Directed by: Matt Cooper
- Written by: Matt Cooper
- Produced by: Matt Cooper; Lori Miller
- Starring: Andrea Anders
- Cinematography: Armando Salas
- Edited by: Luis Colina
- Music by: Tom Howe
- Release dates: February 24, 2016 (Sedona); September 16, 2016 (United States)
- Running time: 95 minutes
- Country: United States
- Language: English

Is That a Gun in Your Pocket? is a 2016 American comedy film written and directed by Matt Cooper and starring Andrea Anders.

== Plot ==
After a school shooting incident involving her son, Jenna a stay at home mother, living with her husband Glenn and their children, lead a movement of women by withholding sexual favors from their husbands until their town is free of guns.

== Cast ==
- Andrea Anders as Jenna Keely
- Matt Passmore as Glenn Keely
- Cloris Leachman as Maxine
- Katherine McNamara as Sandy Keely
- John Michael Higgins as Mayor Wally
- Horatio Sanz as Luis
- Lauren Bowles as Barb Archer
- John Heard as Sheriff Parsons
- Christine Estabrook as Shirley Parsons
- Kevin Conway as Cyrus
- David Denman as Byron
- Fernanda Romero as Connie
- Max Lloyd-Jones as Dexter
- Marshall Bell as Dwayne
- Chad Buchanan as Keith
- Victoria Moroles as Paula

== Reception ==
The film has a 0% rating on Rotten Tomatoes. Mark Jenkins of The Washington Post gave it one star out of four.

== See also ==
- Lysistrata
