= How I Met Your Mother season 2 =

How I Met Your Mother
- Season 2
- Season 2 DVD cover art
- Starring: Josh Radnor; Jason Segel; Cobie Smulders; Neil Patrick Harris; Alyson Hannigan
- No. of episodes: 22

Release
- Original network: CBS
- Original release: September 18, 2006 – May 14, 2007

Season chronology
- ← Previous; Season 1 Next → Season 3

The second season of the American television comedy series How I Met Your Mother premiered on September 18, 2006, and concluded on May 14, 2007. It consisted of 22 episodes, each approximately 22 minutes in length. CBS broadcast the first three episodes of the second season on Monday nights at 8:30 pm in the United States, the remaining episodes were broadcast at 8:00pm. The complete second season was released on region 1 DVD on October 2, 2007. In the United Kingdom it aired on E4 from October 2, 2009, weekdays at 7:30pm.

== Cast ==
=== Main cast ===
- Josh Radnor as Ted Mosby
- Jason Segel as Marshall Eriksen
- Cobie Smulders as Robin Scherbatsky
- Neil Patrick Harris as Barney Stinson
- Alyson Hannigan as Lily Aldrin
- Bob Saget (uncredited) as Future Ted Mosby (voice only)

=== Recurring cast ===
- Lyndsy Fonseca as Penny, Ted's Daughter
- David Henrie as Luke, Ted's Son
- Joe Nieves as Carl
- Charlene Amoia as Wendy the Waitress
- Joe Manganiello as Brad Morris
- Marshall Manesh as Ranjit

=== Guest cast ===
- Bryan Cranston as Hammond Druthers
- David Burtka as Scooter
- Bob Barker as himself
- Wayne Brady as James Stinson
- Michael Gross as Alfred Mosby
- Charles Robinson as Bank President
- Emmitt Smith as himself
- Lucy Hale as Katie Scherbatsky
- Ryan Pinkston as Kyle
- Candice King as Amy

== Episodes ==
Season two episodes
No. overall	No. in season	Title	Directed by	Written by	Original release date	Prod. code	US viewers (millions)
23	1	"Where Were We?"	Pamela Fryman	Carter Bays & Craig Thomas	September 18, 2006	2ALH01	10.48
The gang tries to help Marshall get over Lily. Barney takes him to a strip club, and Ted takes him to a Yankees game. Marshall finds a credit card trail that leads to Lily's hotel in the city, but the guys try to keep him from going to see her.
24	2	"The Scorpion and the Toad"	Rob Greenberg	Chris Harris	September 25, 2006	2ALH02	9.14
Barney teaches Marshall how to pick up women. When things start to go sour for an awkward Marshall, Barney steps in and wins the women over... for himself. Lily returns from her art experience. While helping her look for a new apartment, Ted gets sick of hearing about Lily's amazing summer in San Francisco.
25	3	"Brunch"	Pamela Fryman	Stephen Lloyd	October 2, 2006	2ALH03	9.32
When Ted, Robin, and the gang spend the weekend with his parents, Ted is stunned when a family secret that changes things forever is unveiled at brunch. Meanwhile, Marshall and Lily find it difficult to control themselves when they are forced to spend time together with Ted's parents.
26	4	"Ted Mosby, Architect"	Pamela Fryman	Kristin Newman	October 9, 2006	2ALH04	9.09
After Robin insinuates that Ted's job is boring, Barney sets out to convince his buddy otherwise. As the guys test out the pick-up line, "Ted Mosby, Architect" on the ladies, they realize it really works. But when Robin hears that Ted is parading around town picking up girls, she is hot on his heels to discover the truth.
27	5	"World's Greatest Couple"	Pamela Fryman	Brenda Hsueh	October 16, 2006	2ALH06	9.05
Lily moves into Barney's apartment. It works well at first, as Lily gets rid of Barney's conquests by pretending to be his wife. Barney throws her out when he's disappointed to find that they slept in his bed together without having sex.
28	6	"Aldrin Justice"	Pamela Fryman	Jamie Rhonheimer	October 23, 2006	2ALH05	9.59
Barney takes it on himself to please Marshall's disgruntled law professor, while Lily gets a job at Ted's architecture firm and tries to teach his boss a big lesson.
29	7	"Swarley"	Pamela Fryman	Greg Malins	November 6, 2006	2ALH07	8.22
Barney is mistakenly called Swarley at a coffee shop and his friends call him Swarley all day. Marshall starts dating a woman and they really hit it off, but Barney and Ted tell him he has to dump her because she has "crazy eyes".
30	8	"Atlantic City"	Pamela Fryman	Maria Ferrari	November 13, 2006	2ALH08	9.33
Marshall and Lily, together again, decide to elope to Atlantic City, and they gather Barney, Ted and Robin to take part in the wedding.
31	9	"Slap Bet"	Pamela Fryman	Kourtney Kang	November 20, 2006	2ALH09	8.85
Barney uncovers Robin's secret past and the real reason behind her strong aversion to malls, which leads Barney and Marshall to make a bet.
32	10	"Single Stamina"	Pamela Fryman	Kristin Newman	November 27, 2006	2ALH10	9.85
Barney's brother James (Wayne Brady) visits and Robin, the only one in the group who's never met him, is surprised. But James has a surprise for Barney that he finds hard to accept.
33	11	"How Lily Stole Christmas"	Pamela Fryman	Brenda Hsueh	December 11, 2006	2ALH12	8.66
Ted almost ruins Christmas for everyone when, still carrying around anger toward Lily over breaking the engagement, he calls her a horribly disgusting name.
34	12	"First Time in New York"	Pamela Fryman	Gloria Calderon Kellett	January 8, 2007	2ALH11	8.37
Robin wants to tell Ted she loves him, but she can't make the leap. Meanwhile, her sister visits and brings her boyfriend, and Robin doesn't react well when her sister says she's ready to lose her virginity.
35	13	"Columns"	Rob Greenberg	Matt Kuhn	January 22, 2007	2ALH14	9.42
When Ted is constantly insulted by his former boss, who is now working for him on a project, he is told to fire the man, but he finds that a hard thing to do. Meanwhile, Barney offers Lily a lot of money to paint a nude portrait of him.
36	14	"Monday Night Football"	Rob Greenberg	Carter Bays & Craig Thomas	February 5, 2007	2ALH13	10.61
The group plans to watch the Super Bowl XLI when they are invited to a funeral on the same evening. They make plans to record the game and to not find out the score before watching it the following day.
37	15	"Lucky Penny"	Pamela Fryman	Jamie Rhonheimer	February 12, 2007	2ALH15	9.68
Ted finds a "lucky" penny, and even though bad luck starts to follow him, it may be the best thing to ever happen to him. Marshall trains for the New York City Marathon.
38	16	"Stuff"	Pamela Fryman	Kourtney Kang	February 19, 2007	2ALH16	8.95
After Robin gives Ted grief over keeping all of his gifts from ex-girlfriends, Ted decides it's time to give them all away. However, the tides change when he finds that Robin has been holding on to items as well. Lily tells the whole group to come to her play. After Barney tells her it sucked, she tells him she would compliment a play he performed in regardless of how bad it was – Barney decides to prove her wrong.
39	17	"Arrivederci, Fiero"	Pamela Fryman	Chris Harris	February 26, 2007	2ALH17	9.33
Marshall's beloved 1988 Fiero dies just short of reaching the 200,000-mile mark, leading the gang to relive their greatest memories in the car.
40	18	"Moving Day"	Pamela Fryman	Maria Ferrari	March 19, 2007	2ALH18	7.27
As Ted and Robin hit a new milestone in their relationship, Barney does everything he can to derail their happiness. To do so, Barney steals the rental truck Ted is using for moving day, including all the belongings inside of it.
41	19	"Bachelor Party"	Pamela Fryman	Carter Bays & Craig Thomas	April 9, 2007	2ALH19	7.64
Ted plans a bachelor party for Marshall, against Barney's wishes. Lily has a bridal shower and Robin buys an inappropriate gift. When Barney ruins Marshall's bachelor party plans, Lily reveals information about Barney that forces Marshall to rethink his best man choice.
42	20	"Showdown"	Pamela Fryman	Gloria Calderon Kellett	April 30, 2007	2ALH20	7.24
Barney is chosen as a contestant on The Price Is Right giving him the opportunity to fulfill one of his life wishes: to meet Bob Barker, who he delusionally believes to be his father.
43	21	"Something Borrowed"	Pamela Fryman	Greg Malins	May 7, 2007	2ALH21	7.69
Lily and Marshall's wedding day arrives, but nothing goes as they had planned. Surprisingly, Barney steps in to save their once-in-a-lifetime moment. Meanwhile, Barney abuses the 'it's for the bride' superpower.
44	22	"Something Blue"	Pamela Fryman	Carter Bays & Craig Thomas	May 14, 2007	2ALH22	7.70
Barney overhears that Ted and Robin have a secret, leading him to wonder what it might be. When the secret is revealed, the truth stuns even Barney.
