= Slapsgiving =

- How I Met Your Mother episode
- Episode no.: Season 3 Episode 9
- Directed by: Pamela Fryman
- Written by: Matt Kuhn
- Production code: 3ALH09
- Original air date: November 19, 2007

Guest appearance
- Orson Bean as Bob

Episode chronology
← Previous "Spoiler Alert"	Next → "The Yips"
- How I Met Your Mother season 3

"Slapsgiving" is the ninth episode in the third season of the television series How I Met Your Mother and 53rd overall. It originally aired on CBS on November 19, 2007.

== Plot ==
Future Ted tells his kids about a private joke he and Robin used to share while they were dating: they would salute and repeat what had been said whenever another person used a word that sounded like a military rank before another word in a sentence (an example being "Kernel (Colonel) Stuck In My Teeth"). However, since breaking up they simply share awkward looks whenever someone does it, and are unable to spend time alone together.

Thanksgiving is approaching, and this will be the group's first with Marshall and Lily as a married couple. With Lily obsessing over making sure it is perfect, Robin invites her 41-year-old boyfriend Bob (who Ted perceives to be ancient) to Thanksgiving dinner, and Marshall terrorizes Barney in the days leading up to Barney's third slap and has even set up a countdown website. When Robin and Ted are the only two members of the group to show up to a night of baking pies, they notice that they have nothing to talk about when they are together, creating a nagging feeling that they are no longer really friends, but end up having sex out of awkwardness.

When Ted and Robin arrive at Marshall and Lily's apartment for Thanksgiving, they reveal separately to their friends what happened. Over the men's objections, Lily convinces Robin to talk to Ted about their relationship. After the two discuss how weird it is to be around each other, they come to the realization that they are not friends and agree that after the dinner they should not see each other again. Meanwhile, Barney begins to get upset at the notion of another slap. Following Marshall's relentless taunting of Barney and lack of interest in helping her prepare, Lily declares as Slap Bet Commissioner that no slap would occur on Thanksgiving, much to Barney's delight and Marshall's dismay.

Everyone sits down for Thanksgiving dinner and Lily is upset that no one is taking it very seriously. Robin and Ted exchange sad glances with each other. Marshall speaks up and thanks Lily for her hard work in putting together the dinner. Later during dinner Bob uses the phrase "major buzzkill", and Ted and Robin absent-mindedly salute, causing them to realize there is still a connection between them and they can still be friends. Future Ted tells his kids that since he had a great evening with his friends (and Bob), he takes them to Marshall and Lily's to spend Thanksgiving every year. Barney begins to taunt dismayed Marshall as the slap countdown enters the last ten seconds. At first Lily warns him not to go through with the slap, but when Barney keeps taunting, she allows the slap to happen with only three seconds to go. Overjoyed, Marshall slaps Barney immediately sending him flying across the room before singing "You Just Got Slapped" (a song of his own creation) with everybody.

In the kitchen after dinner, Ted notes there is going to be a "major clean-up" making everyone unknowingly salute and despair. Marshall asks if this is going to be a regular occurrence from now on and Robin replies, "That's the general idea", causing another salute.

== Critical response ==
- Donna Bowman of The A.V. Club rated the episode B.
- Eric Goldman of IGN gave the episode 8.5 out of 10. He describes the slap bet as one of the funniest running jokes of the series. Goldman was also impressed by how well Neil Patrick Harris took the slap, describing it as "like Biff Tannen taking a punch from George McFly".
- Entertainment Weekly put it on its end-of-the-decade, "best-of" list, saying, "After winning permission to slap Barney in a bet, Marshall renames Turkey Day in 2007. Slapstick ensues, setting the stage for "Slapsgiving 2" in 2009. Did we mention it's a real knee-slapper?"
