= Maura West =

American actress (born 1972)

- West in 2010
- Born: Maura Jo Snyder; April 27, 1972 (age 54); Springfield, Massachusetts, U.S.
- Education: Carnegie Mellon University; Boston University (BFA)
- Occupation: Actress
- Years active: 1995–present
- Known for: Performance in American soap opera television
- Works: Filmography
- Television: As the World Turns (1995–2010); The Young and the Restless (2010–2011); General Hospital (2013–present)
- Spouses: Jonathan Knight (m. 1995; div. 1999) Scott DeFreitas (m. 2000)
- Children: 5
- Awards: Full list

Maura West DeFreitas (born Maura Jo Snyder; April 27, 1972) is an American actress. She began her career in 1995 when she was cast Carly Tenney on the CBS soap opera As the World Turns; she remained with the soap until its series finale on September 17, 2010. West later went on to portray Diane Jenkins on The Young and the Restless from September 2010 to August 2011. In 2013, she was cast in the role of art dealer Ava Jerome on General Hospital. She has been nominated for 12 Daytime Emmy Awards, winning three of them for Outstanding Lead Actress in a Drama Series.

== Early life ==
West was born on April 27, 1972, in Springfield, Massachusetts, as the youngest of four children, with two brothers and a sister. Growing up in Ludlow, Massachusetts, West attended Boston University, graduating with a bachelor's degree in fine arts.

== Career ==
In 1995, West joined the cast of the CBS soap opera As the World Turns in the role of Carly Tenney. She held the role from April 11, 1995, to May 8, 1996. West later returned to the role on September 10, 1997, remaining on the series until its television finale on September 17, 2010. West has received a number of honors for her portrayal of Carly, including nominations for the Soap Opera Digest Award for Outstanding Villainess in 1996, for Outstanding Younger Lead Actress 1999 and 2000, for Favorite Couple in 2001, an award which she shared with costar Michael Park. She received a Daytime Emmy Award nomination for Outstanding Supporting Actress in a Drama Series in 2001 and 2002. West also received three nominations for the Daytime Emmy Award for Outstanding Lead Actress in a Drama Series in 2004, 2008 and 2009; winning twice, in 2007 and in 2010. At the 32nd Daytime Emmy Awards, West and Park received a nomination for the Special Fan Award for Most Irresistible Combination.

It was announced in August 2010 that West would join the CBS soap opera The Young and the Restless, as the third actress to portray Diane Jenkins. West began work in the role on September 1, 2010, and made her first appearance on the show on October 8, 2010. In May 2011, CBS Soaps In-depth confirmed West had been let go from the soap after only several months on-air.

In April 2013, it was announced that West would join the ABC soap opera General Hospital, in a top-secret role. On April 24, 2013, West was confirmed to have joined the cast in the newly created role of Ava Jerome, and first appeared on May 8. West's portrayal of Ava has been met with critical acclaim, having earned her a nomination for the Daytime Emmy Award for Outstanding Lead Actress in a Drama Series in 2015, her first for her portrayal of Ava and sixth over-all in the category. She later won in the category on April 26, 2015.

In 2014, West made her first feature film appearance in Come Back to Me, which served as an adaption of the novel The Resurrectionist.

== Personal life ==
West has been married twice: to director Jonathan Knight from 1995 until their divorce in 1999, and to former As the World Turns costar Scott DeFreitas since January 22, 2000. West has five children from her two marriages. Her marriage to Knight gave her a son: Benjamin (born in 1996). Meanwhile, she has four kids with DeFreitas: two sons Joseph (born 2000), and Basil (born 2007), and two daughters Katherine (born 2002) and Birdie (born 2009). One of her children, Joe West, is a Broadway actor.

== Filmography ==
List of acting performances in film and television
Year	Title	Role	Notes	Ref.
1995–2010	As the World Turns	Carly Snyder	Series regular	
2000	A Baby Story	Herself	One episode (May 12, 2000)	
2010–2011	The Young and the Restless	Diane Jenkins	Series regular	
2013–present	General Hospital	Ava Jerome	Series regular	
2014	Come Back to Me	Eileen Wallace	Film adaptation of The Resurrectionist	

== Awards and nominations ==
List of acting awards and nominations
Year	Award	Category	Title	Result	Ref.
1996	Soap Opera Digest Award	Outstanding Villainess	As the World Turns	Nominated	
1999	Soap Opera Digest Award	Outstanding Younger Lead Actress	As the World Turns	Nominated	
2000	Soap Opera Digest Award	Outstanding Younger Lead Actress	As the World Turns	Nominated	
2001	Daytime Emmy Award	Outstanding Supporting Actress in a Drama Series	As the World Turns	Nominated	
2001	Soap Opera Digest Award	Favorite Couple (shared with Michael Park)	As the World Turns	Nominated	
2002	Daytime Emmy Award	Outstanding Supporting Actress in a Drama Series	As the World Turns	Nominated	
2004	Daytime Emmy Award	Outstanding Lead Actress in a Drama Series	As the World Turns	Nominated	
2005	Daytime Emmy Award	Most Irresistible Combination (shared with Michael Park)	As the World Turns	Nominated	
2007	Daytime Emmy Award	Outstanding Lead Actress in a Drama Series	As the World Turns	Won	
2008	Daytime Emmy Award	Outstanding Lead Actress in a Drama Series	As the World Turns	Nominated	
2009	Daytime Emmy Award	Outstanding Lead Actress in a Drama Series	As the World Turns	Nominated	
2010	Daytime Emmy Award	Outstanding Lead Actress in a Drama Series	As the World Turns	Won	
2015	Daytime Emmy Award	Outstanding Lead Actress in a Drama Series	General Hospital	Won	
2016	Daytime Emmy Award	Outstanding Lead Actress in a Drama Series	General Hospital	Nominated	
2018	Daytime Emmy Award	Outstanding Lead Actress in a Drama Series	General Hospital	Nominated	
2019	Daytime Emmy Award	Outstanding Lead Actress in a Drama Series	General Hospital	Nominated	
2020	Daytime Emmy Award	Outstanding Lead Actress in a Drama Series	General Hospital	Nominated	

== See also ==
- Jack Snyder and Carly Tenney
