= Matt Passmore =

Australian actor (born 1973)

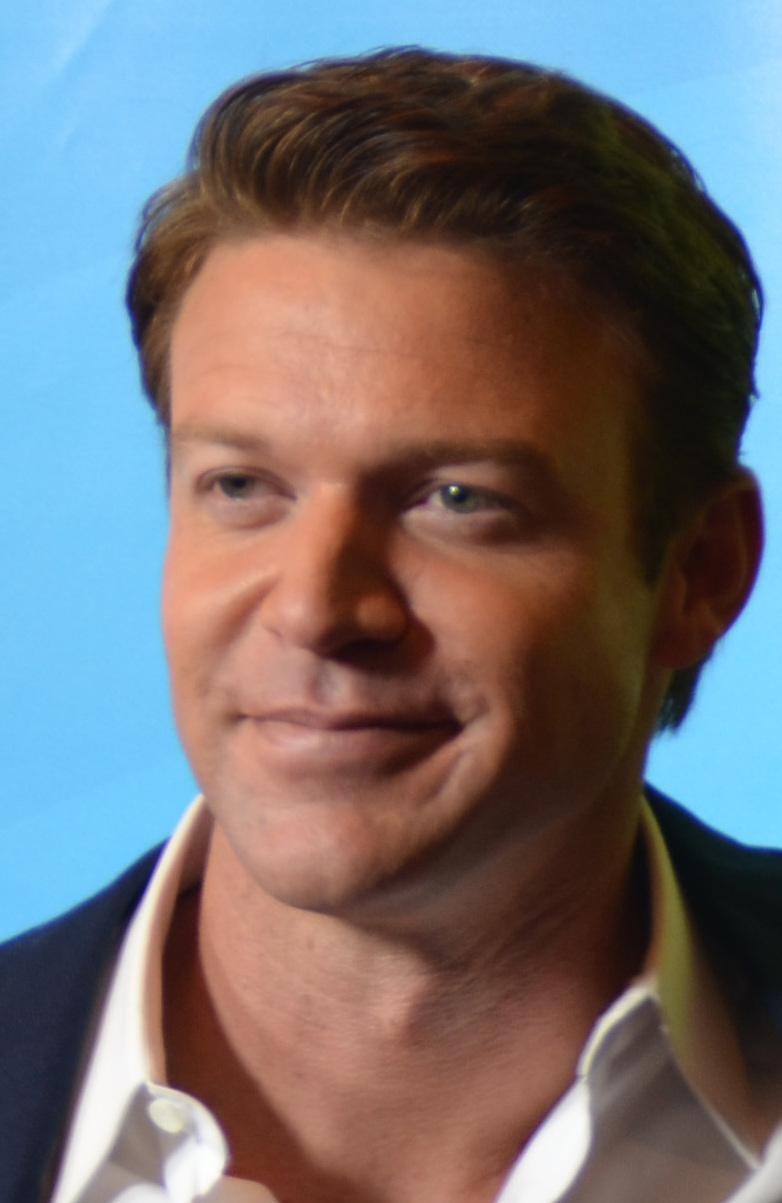
- Passmore in 2014
- Born: Matthew Passmore; 24 December 1973 (age 52); Brisbane, Queensland, Australia
- Occupation: Actor
- Years active: 2002–present
- Children: 1

Matthew Passmore (born 24 December 1973) is an Australian actor. In television, Passmore is known for his lead roles on Australian shows as Cameron Kennedy on the Seven Network series Last Man Standing (2005), Marcus Turner on the Nine Network drama series McLeod's Daughters (2006–2009), and Dan on the ABC TV series Frayed (2019–2021). In America, he is known for his lead roles as Jim Longworth on the A&E crime series The Glades (2010–2013) and Neil Truman on the USA Network series Satisfaction (2014–2015), and his recurring role as Ted Wynn on the Netflix series 13 Reasons Why (2020).

In film, Passmore has had main cast roles in Is That a Gun in Your Pocket? (2016) and Jigsaw (2017), and supporting roles in Come Back to Me (2014) and MR-9: Do or Die (2023).

== Career ==
Before his acting career began, Passmore spent time in the Australian army. He began his on screen career on the children's television series Play School. Later on, he took on a variety of roles on Australian television shows such as Always Greener, Blue Heelers, The Cooks, Last Man Standing, McLeod's Daughters, and Underbelly: Tale of Two Cities. Passmore also starred in USA Network's Satisfaction.

== Filmography ==
=== Film ===
List of films and roles
Year	Title	Role	Notes
2003	Tuck and Cover	Pete	Short film
2005	Son of the Mask	Network Executive	
2008	Noir Drive	Reilly	Short film
2009	Masterwork	Marcus Vanderwold	Television film
2014	Come Back to Me	Josh	
2016	Is That a Gun in Your Pocket?	Glenn Keely	
2017	Jigsaw	Logan Nelson	
2019	Nox	Peter Marlowe	Short film
2019	Family Pictures	Mark	Television film
2020	Army of One	Dillion Baker	
2021	Deadly Switch	Sheriff Eden	
2022	Wrong Reasons	Kirby Smothers	
2022	Onomatopeople	Chugga Chugga	Short film
2023	MR-9: Do or Die	Ricci Ross	

=== Television ===
List of television appearances and roles
Year	Title	Role	Notes
2002– 2011	Play School	Himself (presenter)	47 episodes
2003	Always Greener	Pete 'The Love Professor' Jones	Recurring role (season 2); 13 episodes
2003	Blue Heelers	Brad Fingleton	Recurring role (season 10); 5 episodes
2004– 2005	The Cooks	Jake	Recurring role; 6 episodes
2005	Last Man Standing	Cameron Kennedy	Main role; 22 episodes
2005	The Alice	Tom	Episode: "#1.16"
2006– 2009	McLeod's Daughters	Greg Hope / Marcus Turner	Guest (season 6), main role (season 7–8); 55 episodes
2009	The Cut	Andrew Telford	Main role; 6 episodes
2009	Underbelly: A Tale of Two Cities	Warwick Mobbs	Recurring role; 9 episodes
2010– 2013	The Glades	Jim Longworth	Main role; 49 episodes
2014– 2015	Satisfaction	Neil Truman	Main role; 20 episodes
2016	Roadies	Sean	Episode: "The Load Out"
2017	Lethal Weapon	Gideon Lyon	2 episodes
2019– 2021	Frayed	Dan	Main role; 10 episodes
2020	13 Reasons Why	Ted Wynn (Deputy Sheriff)	Recurring role (season 4); 6 episodes
2021	Younger	Kai Manning	2 episodes
2023	North Shore	Greg Hardy	Main role; 6 episodes
2024	Tracker	Government Official	Episode: "Ontological Shock"
2025	Poker Face	Himself	Episode: "The Taste of Human Blood"
