= The Bro Code =

2008 book by Barney Stinson

- Author: Carter Bays; Craig Thomas; Matt Kuhn
- Language: English
- Subject: Interpersonal relationships Etiquette
- Genre: Law
- Publisher: Simon & Schuster
- Publication date: October 14, 2008
- Publication place: Canada
- Media type: Print (Paperback); e-Book; Audio Book (CD)
- Pages: 208 (Paperback)
- ISBN: 978-1-4391-1000-3
- Followed by: Bro on the Go

The Bro Code is a book by Carter Bays and Craig Thomas, the creators of How I Met Your Mother, and Matt Kuhn, one of the show's writers.

The book was inspired by the notion of "Bro code" they developed in the sitcom. Published by Simon & Schuster, the book covers 150 rules written in articles of what "bros" should or should not do. The book was penned by Barney Stinson and also credited with Kuhn, who also wrote the entries of Barney's blog, mentioned in the series. The book was first shown in the episode "The Goat". Greig Dymond of CBC.ca calls the book "a tongue-in-cheek guide to etiquette for horn-dog dudes." At the end of each episode, a vanity card is used to display a random rule from the Bro Code, similar to what is done on Chuck Lorre–produced shows.

The Bro Code (As shown in The Bro Code: As seen on CBS's How I Met Your Mother):

"When in the course of human events it becomes necessary for Bros to settle a dispute, decent respect to the opinions of the Bro-Kind requires that they should declare the clauses which impel them to argue, Though prudence says it's probably a chick. We hold these truths to be self evident."

-Beginning of "The Bro Code"
