= Come Back to Me (2014 film) =

American psychological horror film

- Film poster
- Directed by: Paul Leyden
- Written by: James Leyden
- Based on: The Resurrectionist by Wrath James White
- Produced by: Anne Clements
- Starring: Katie Walder; Nathan Keyes; Matt Passmore; Laura Gordon; Jon Abrahams; Andrew Beckham; Maura West
- Cinematography: Joseph White
- Edited by: Sherwood Jones
- Music by: Thomas Morse
- Production companies: Base Productions; Idiot Savant Pictures
- Distributed by: Freestyle Releasing
- Release date: July 25, 2014
- Running time: 96 minutes
- Country: United States
- Language: English
- Box office: $7,744

Come Back to Me is a 2014 psychological horror film directed and written by Paul Leyden. It stars Katie Walder and Matt Passmore as a married couple who experience unexplained night terrors after a new neighbor (Nathan Keyes) moves in across the street. It is based on The Resurrectionist by Wrath James White.

== Plot ==
As a teenager, Dale witnesses the apparent murder of his mother, Eileen, by his methamphetamine-addicted father. When the police arrive, they confront and kill Dale's father. The officer who discovers Eileen runs from the house and vomits, but Dale re-enters the house and tells his mother that everything will be all right. Years later in Las Vegas, Dale moves across the street from married couple Sarah and Josh, who introduce themselves by bringing over cookies. Josh explains that he is a croupier and Sarah a graduate student who is working on her dissertation on the effects of pornography. When Sarah questions Dale as to why he is staring at her, he says that she reminds him of someone, later revealed to be his mother.

While Josh takes additional shifts at work, Sarah passes out and experiences a highly realistic dream in which she is murdered. Confused by the fact that her clothes are different and the room cleaned, she investigates further and discovers her original shirt in the laundry, bloodied. Josh suggests that she talk to her friend Leslie, a pregnant doctor. Leslie, who experienced similar issues in the past, diagnoses her with night terrors and prescribes a hypnotic. Although somewhat relieved, Sarah points out that a prominent scar has disappeared, which Leslie cannot explain. Concerned, Josh calls in a favor and surprises Sarah with a vacation at a luxurious hotel. There, Sarah sleeps well and does not experience any of her previous symptoms.

However, when she returns home, the night terrors and unexplained blackouts return, and she now experiences nausea. Much to her annoyance, Dale notices that she appears ill, and he demands to know where she was. When Dale leaves for work, Sarah investigates his house and finds photographs of various people in deathlike states, including herself. As she discovers a replica of her house key made while Dale delivered groceries, Dale returns home and apparently kills her with a blow to the head; Sarah wakes up in her own bed, gasping, and assumes the mostly-unremembered episode was another case of night terrors. Later, at Leslie's house, Sarah notices an unused home pregnancy test, which reveals that she is pregnant. Leslie promises to schedule more tests for the pregnancy, blackouts, and night terrors.

Unknown to Sarah, Josh is sterile. When he learns of her pregnancy, he immediately leaves her. Now on her own, Sarah installs hidden video surveillance cameras to record herself so she can better understand her night terrors, but they reveal that Dale has been entering the house, raping and murdering her, and then resurrecting her. In the process, she loses her memories of the event. Disturbed, she researches Dale online and finds that his mother has been institutionalized. At the hospital, she learns from Eileen that Dale has a long history of murdering and resurrecting neighbors. Eileen says that she caused herself to be institutionalized in order to escape Dale, who resurrected her after she committed suicide. Eileen asks Sarah to kill Dale, an action she could not bring herself to do.

When Leslie gives birth, she is confused when the baby does not look like either of the possible fathers, and she recalls the video evidence of Sarah's rape, knowing that she had prior contact with Dale when he delivered her groceries, too. Meanwhile, Josh returns home after his friend convinces him to give Sarah another chance; however, Sarah shoots and kills him when she mistakes him for Dale. Sarah begs Dale to resurrect Josh, and, when he refuses, seduces him so that she can trick him into it. As Josh revives, he confusedly rescues Sarah from Dale, and Sarah shoots Dale dead. As Dale dies, all of the victims that he has murdered and revived suddenly drop dead of their previous wounds, including Sarah, Josh, and Leslie. The film ends with a close-up of Leslie's child.

== Cast ==
- Katie Walder as Sarah
- Nathan Keyes as Dale
- Matt Passmore as Josh
- Laura Gordon as Leslie, Sarah's friend
- Jon Abrahams as Johnny, Josh's friend
- Maura West as Eileen, Dale's mother
- Steve Rizzo as Dale's father

== Release ==
Freestyle Releasing gave the film a limited theatrical release on July 25, 2014.

== Reception ==
Rotten Tomatoes, a review aggregator, reports that 17% of six surveyed critics gave the film a positive review; the average rating was 3.4/10. Metacritic rated it 31/100 based on five reviews. Frank Scheck of The Hollywood Reporter wrote, "A terrific premise is squandered in this ineffective horror film, which nonetheless has a truly disturbing climax." Ben Kenigsberg of The New York Times wrote that the film is unpredictable but only because it "is so ludicrous that logical conjecture is doomed to fail." Gary Goldstein of the Los Angeles Times called it an "exceedingly far-fetched" film that "borrows the best bits from several horror classics to great effect". Rob Staeger of The Village Voice called it "a tired stab at psychological horror" that uses voice-over as a narrative crutch. Tirdad Derakhshani of The Philadelphia Inquirer wrote, "A grisly supernatural slasher that boasts a devilishly clever twist, Leyden's film lacks the sophistication to allow its unique idea to flower into much more than a gimmick." Paul Doro of Shock Till You Drop called it "one strange, disjointed, and moderately compelling little movie" that may appeal to fans of "hard-to-categorize oddities". Scott Hallam of Dread Central wrote, "Definitely one to take a look at, Come Back to Me is a very entertaining story with some great performances and a director who deftly puts it all together."
