= Lucky Penny =

- How I Met Your Mother episode
- Episode no.: Season 2 Episode 15
- Directed by: Pamela Fryman
- Written by: Jamie Rhonheimer
- Production code: 2ALH15
- Original air date: February 12, 2007

Guest appearances
- Meredith Scott Lynn as Phyllis; John Rosenfeld as Guy; Kelly Perine as Fred

Episode chronology
← Previous "Monday Night Football"	Next → "Stuff"
- How I Met Your Mother season 2

"Lucky Penny" is the 15th episode in the second season of the television series How I Met Your Mother and 37th overall. It originally aired on CBS on February 12, 2007.

== Plot ==
Ted and Robin are running through the airport, trying to catch a plane to Chicago, where Ted has a job interview with a large architecture firm for the job of running the company's New York branch. As they reach their gate, the flight attendant tells them they cannot get on the flight. They explain that Ted had to attend a court date that morning for jumping a subway turnstile, and she asks them to wait while she talks with the flight. While they wait, Robin suggests that their lateness was Barney's fault.

The show then flashbacks a few months to when Marshall had just broken his toe, disappointing him as he had been training hard to run the New York City Marathon. Barney complained about his moaning, stating that running a marathon is easy, even without training. Marshall then bet Barney he could not complete the marathon, but to the group's surprise, Barney completed the marathon quite easily, showing no signs of being tired. Upon being informed that marathon runners could ride the subway free that day, Barney decided to ride the subway and show off the medal he was given for finishing the marathon. Later, Barney found himself suddenly unable to move his legs, forcing him to ride the subway end-to-end and call Ted to come and help him. In his rush, Ted failed to pay to use the subway, jumped the turnstile, and got tackled by a cop before he could help Barney.

The story then returns to the present, where the attendant tells Ted and Robin that their flight has already left, but they may be able to catch another flight leaving shortly. While making their way to the other gate, Ted remembers why Barney ran the marathon in the first place and blames Robin for the lateness. He recalls that in April 2006, Marshall decided to run the marathon to get into shape, with help from Lily and a guide book. One piece of advice suggested that the runner should apply petroleum jelly to areas affected by chafing, including the nipples. While following this advice, Robin walked in on Marshall, surprising him so much that he fell, breaking his toe.

Robin tells Ted that she is not to blame for their lateness, and the reason why she was at the apartment that morning was because of Lily. Robin recalls how she and Ted spotted a line of people camping outside a wedding dress store for a big sale. When they told Lily, she decided to go as well, and Robin agreed to camp out with her for the night. They could not get any sleep because of a car alarm, so Robin decided to sleep at Ted's apartment that day, where she found Marshall, causing him to break his toe.

Meanwhile, Ted and Robin reach the second flight in time and ask if there are any seats. While the attendant searches, Ted realizes it was not Lily's fault. A few months earlier, while riding the subway Ted found a penny from 1939 (during the events of “The Scorpion and the Toad”). Believing it to be valuable, Ted sold it to a collector, but only got $1.50. He and Robin decided to spend the money on hot dogs from the other side of town, which is where they saw the line for the dress store.

Knowing the story does not go back any further, Ted concludes it was his own fault for missing the first flight, Ted is then told there are no seats on the second flight, meaning that he has to miss the interview. Ted is upset, but Robin comforts him and tells him that if the firm wants him they will reschedule the interview. Future Ted reveals that the firm did not reschedule and someone else got the job, however he now knows that it was his destiny not to get it after all. Three months later, the guy who got the job was made to relocate to Chicago and Future Ted knows that if he had not found the penny and triggered the whole chain of events then he might have had to leave New York and never met his wife.

== Production ==
Craig Thomas later stated that Ted's children's names, Luke and Penny, came from the title of this episode.

== Critical response ==
Staci Krause of IGN gave the episode 8.8 out of 10.
