= Slap Bet =

- How I Met Your Mother episode
- Episode no.: Season 2 Episode 9
- Directed by: Pamela Fryman
- Written by: Kourtney Kang
- Production code: 2ALH09
- Original air date: November 20, 2006

Guest appearances
- Candace Kroslak as Girl #1; Rachel Specter as Girl #2

Episode chronology
← Previous "Atlantic City"	Next → "Single Stamina"
- How I Met Your Mother season 2

"Slap Bet" is the ninth episode of the second season of the American sitcom How I Met Your Mother. The episode, originally titled "Robin Sparkles", first aired on November 20, 2006 on CBS; the title was changed in order to keep the episode's ending a secret. The episode received highly positive reviews and features in several lists of the best How I Met Your Mother episodes. The episode led to two recurring jokes and storylines in the show: "Robin Sparkles", Robin's teenage pop star career, and the Slap Bet, in which Marshall slaps Barney at various points throughout the series.

== Plot ==
Ted, Marshall, Lily, and Barney find out that Robin never goes to malls and refuses to explain why. Marshall posits that Robin was married in a mall in Canada, because whenever asked about Canada, Robin only talks about her friend who got married way too young. Barney, however, believes that the secret is related to pornography. They agree to a slap bet, where the winner of the bet slaps the loser as hard as he can, and appoint Lily as the slap bet commissioner. Barney then starts working his way through hours of Canadian porn, which he finds both depressing and tedious.

Ted begins to worry that Robin is married. Ted pesters Robin to reveal if she really got married in Canada. After trying to avoid the issue, Robin tells Ted that she got married in a mall, after which her husband moved to Hong Kong without getting a divorce. Ted promises to keep it a secret but tells the gang after Lily begs him, so Marshall slaps Barney.

To try and help Ted, law student Marshall searches a legal database and he reveals that there is no record of a marriage license for Robin in Canada. After asking her various questions about her wedding, Ted confronts Robin and she admits she is not married but finds out that Ted told Marshall her supposed secret. She is angry and tells him that she was testing him to see how long it would take him to tell the rest of the gang. She refuses to tell Ted the true reason she avoids malls. Marshall tells Lily that Robin is not married and Lily, as the slap bet commissioner, must allow Barney to slap Marshall three times (one for the lie, two for being premature).

Barney reveals that he has uncovered a video of Robin and asks her if the name "Robin Sparkles" sounds familiar, which worries Robin. Ted tries to stop Barney from playing the video but Robin lets Barney play it. The beginning of the video shows Robin, dressed as a schoolgirl, seductively pleading with a teacher not to give her detention. Barney, to preserve Robin's dignity, pauses the video and slaps Marshall. Robin is surprised to learn that the others think that it is porn, and plays the rest of the video: A 1980s-style bubblegum pop music video where a teenage Robin (referred to as "Robin Sparkles") sings "Let's Go to the Mall". Robin repeatedly sang the Canadian hit on a lengthy tour of malls around the country, causing her to develop a phobia of malls.

Lily points out that Barney slapped Marshall without having won the bet and without the permission of the slap bet commissioner. Lily gives Barney a choice: He can be slapped ten times immediately, or five times at any moment Marshall chooses. Barney picks the five slaps. Robin tells Ted that she is glad Ted knows her secret now. They kiss and Marshall suddenly slaps Barney, proclaiming "That's one".

The episode ends with the group, excluding Robin, dancing to her music video.

=== The Eight Slaps ===
As said before, Marshall was initially granted five slaps by Lily; he received three supplementary slaps in Episode 7.09 "Disaster Averted". The total amount of eight slaps was distributed as follows.

- The first slap was immediately delivered.
- The second slap happened in Episode 2.16 "Stuff", after Barney forced his friends to watch a one-man show in which he provoked Lily.
- The third slap happened in Episode 3.09 "Slapsgiving", on Thanksgiving, after Slap bet commissioner Lily revoked the truce she had proclaimed for the feast.
- The fourth slap happened in Episode 5.09 "Slapsgiving 2: Revenge of the Slap": after being initially bequeathed to Ted and Robin who could not agree on who was going to use it, the slap was eventually delivered by Marshall.
- The fifth and the sixth slap happened in Episode 7.09 "Disaster Averted", where Barney has been forced to wear a duckie tie for days. Lily offers him to take it off, but he must gain three extra slaps, which he agrees on. Marshall immediately delivers two slaps.
- The seventh slap happened in Episode 9.14 "Slapsgiving 3", already mentioned, where Marshall calls it "The Slap Of A Million Exploding Suns".
- The eighth and final slap happened in Episode 9.22 "The End of the Aisle", where Marshall slaps Barney in order to calm him down during a panic attack.

== Production ==
The episode was originally titled "Robin Sparkles," but the title was changed to "Slap Bet" in order to avoid giving away the ending. In reruns, CBS used the originally intended "Robin Sparkles" title. In syndication, this episode is titled "Slap Bet".

The menu that Robin makes up when Ted questions her about her wedding was the actual menu at the wedding of writer Kourtney Kang, which took place two weeks prior to the writing of this episode.

This is the first appearance of Robin's young bubblegum pop persona, Robin Sparkles. Sparkles appears onscreen again in the season 3 episode "Sandcastles in the Sand" (also the name of Sparkles' music video) and the season 6 episode "Glitter". Robin's later grunge persona, Robin Daggers, appears in the season 8 episode "P.S. I Love You".

== Critical response ==
"Slap Bet" is often included in lists of the best How I Met Your Mother episodes. As of June 2025, it has the second-best rating of any How I Met Your Mother episode on IMDb, surpassed only by the 9th season episode "How Your Mother Met Me".

Staci Krause of IGN gave the episode 8.9 out of 10, describing it as "hilarious" and "a good break from the progressive storyline the show usually boasts". Krause said the "scene-stealing moment" was when the characters realized the video of Robin was a music video and described the video as "a very tongue-in-cheek homage to 80s pop in America". Later, in IGN's list of the 10 best How I Met Your Mother episodes, "Slap Bet" was selected as the best episode, citing the episode's introduction of "one of the show's most notable and iconic recurring bits: the titular Slap Bet" and noting that "it gave rise to Robin's teen pop star alter ego". The music video was described as the "ultimate gift" to television.

In 2010, Joyce Eng of TV Guide called the episode "possibly the show's finest half-hour" and said, "nothing will ever be or beat 'Slap Bet'".

Miss Alli of Television Without Pity gave the episode an A+. In 2009, TV Guide ranked "Slap Bet" #62 on its list of the 100 Greatest Episodes.

The episode appeared on Radio Times' list of the top 10 episodes of the series. Josh Lasser of HitFix said "Slap Bet" was the best episode of the show in a list of the top 10 episodes. Digital Spy rated the episode fourth in its top 10 list.

In 2012, Eric Eisenberg of Cinema Blend chose "Slap Bet" as the best episode of How I Met Your Mother. Eisenberg commented, "the highlight of "Slap Bet" is the use of misdirection", and described Robin's singing as "maddening and hilarious". He said the song was "one of the best TV-created pop songs of all time" and claimed the episode had "a wonderful impact on the show at large", explaining that "both major elements at play in "Slap Bet" have gone on to have effects seen in multiple episodes throughout the program". In 2018, TheRinger.com listed this episode at #52 in its list of the best 100 television episodes to have aired since 2000, and was the only episode of How I Met Your Mother to have made the list.
