= Disaster Averted =

- How I Met Your Mother episode
- Episode no.: Season 7 Episode 9
- Directed by: Michael Shea
- Written by: Robia Rashid
- Original air date: November 7, 2011

Guest appearances
- Kal Penn as Kevin; Teresa Castillo as Maya

Episode chronology
← Previous "The Slutty Pumpkin Returns"	Next → "Tick, Tick, Tick..."
- How I Met Your Mother (season 7)

"Disaster Averted" is the ninth episode of the seventh season of the CBS sitcom How I Met Your Mother, and the 145th episode overall. It aired on November 7, 2011.

== Plot ==
Barney has grown tired of his Ducky Tie and makes up a story in order to hide the fact that he has thrown it away, but he is foiled when Lily enters the bar holding the tie after having found it in the garbage.

When entering MacLaren's bar, Kevin notices a sign at the entrance which read "Absolutely no boogie boarding", and asks about it. The group tells him what happened to them during Hurricane Irene. Ted had planned to have his friends ride out the hurricane in his house out of the city, but Barney convinced them to stay in his city apartment, saying that the storm was nothing to worry about. Marshall had no health insurance during this time because of his unemployment. He saw death everywhere and refused to go alone anywhere without Lily because he feared he could be attacked by a bear.

Lily, Ted and Barney eventually got calls from their parents asking if they were all right, and Robin grew jealous because her father had not called her. When she denied that she felt neglected, Barney fake-called Robin as her dad to prove her jealousy. When the group did decide to evacuate to Ted's house, Ted told Barney that he could not come with them, as Ted found a girl in the hallway who he said could ride in Barney's place. This alteration caused altercations; everyone fought over who got to go or stay, especially as Lily complained that Marshall was not giving her enough alone time and that all she wanted to do is sit in the bath and read a book, until Ted finally decided to go by himself.

Marshall turned on the TV just in time to call Ted back to hear Mayor Bloomberg's speech saying that the evacuation time had passed and that everyone must go inside and wait out the storm. Later that night, Marshall ran Lily a bath and told her to have a little alone time. Out of gratitude, Lily kissed him passionately and they ended up conceiving their baby boy in Barney's bathroom.

Meanwhile, in the present, Barney offers to let Marshall deliver his final remaining slap in their Slap Bet in return for being allowed to take the Ducky Tie off. Marshall is torn between slapping Barney and forcing him to continue wearing the tie until Kevin points out that since Barney had not complained about the Ducky Tie in weeks, there must be an agenda to Barney's offer. Kevin hypothesizes that he has to impress someone and deduces that Barney is going to meet Nora's parents, which Barney reveals happens in two days. Lily and Marshall agree that Barney can take off the tie, but he must gain an extra three slaps to his already existing final slap. Barney agrees and Marshall delivers two of the slaps, with two still remaining.

In the end, it is shown that the gang had gone out after the end of the hurricane and played around in the rain, which led to Marshall going boogie-boarding and eventually crashing through MacLaren's front window – hence the sign against boogie-boarding. Robin and Barney decide to share a cab home and they reminisce about the moment after Marshall's accident when they had almost kissed but Robin's dad had called her. They make fun of what could have happened and end up kissing in the cab.

== Critical response ==
The A.V. Club's Donna Bowman graded the episode an A−, stating that it had several of the same elements that made the Ducky Tie a wonderful episode: "constantly interrupted storytelling, callbackariffic structuring, fleet pacing, machine-gun dialogue, and a dollop of sweetness at the end."

Angel Cohn of Television Without Pity gave the episode a B+.
