= Barney Stinson =

Fictional character on the CBS sitcom How I Met Your Mother

- How I Met Your Mother character
- Neil Patrick Harris as Barney Stinson
- First appearance: "Pilot (2005)"
- Last appearance: "Daddy (2023)"
- Created by: Carter Bays; Craig Thomas
- Portrayed by: Neil Patrick Harris; Tanner Maguire; Riley Thomas Stewart

In-universe information
- Full name: Barnabus Stinson
- Nicknames: The Barnacle; Awesome; Swarley
- Gender: Male
- Occupation: PLEASE...! (Provide Legal Exculpation and Sign Everything); FBI informant Lifestyle blogger
- Family: Loretta Stinson (mother); Jerome Whittaker (father); Cheryl Whittaker (step-mother); James Stinson (maternal half-brother); Jerome "J. J." Whittaker, Jr. (paternal half-brother); Carly Whittaker (paternal half-sister)
- Spouses: Robin Scherbatsky (m. 2013; div. 2016) (broadcast ending) (m. 2013; div. 2016) (m. 2020) (Alternate DVD ending)
- Children: Ellie Stinson (daughter, born 2020)
- Relatives: Tom (brother-in-law); Eli Stinson (nephew); Sadie Stinson (niece); Leslie (cousin)
- Nationality: American

Barney Stinson is a fictional character portrayed by Neil Patrick Harris and created by Carter Bays and Craig Thomas for the CBS television series How I Met Your Mother (2005–2014).

One of the show's main characters, Barney is known for his eccentric personality. He is a womanizer known for his love of expensive suits, laser tag, and Scotch whisky. To seduce women he frequently utilizes a variety of elaborate strategies, or 'plays', compiled in his 'playbook'. In later seasons, he has a few serious relationships, then marries, divorces, has a child with an unnamed woman from a one-night stand, and then marries the same woman again (as implied in the alternate ending). Barney's catchphrases included "Suit up!", “Go for Barney”, "What up?!", "Stinson out", "Legendary", "Wait for it" (often combining the two as "legen—wait for it—dary!"), "Daddy's home", "Haaaaave you met Ted", “True story”, “That’s the dream!”, "Challenge accepted", "Just.. just... okay?", and "I only have one rule." (that one rule is constantly changing).

Critics have praised the character and credited Harris’ performance for much of the show's success. Barney is considered the show's breakout character.

== Development ==
The show's creators envisioned Barney as what Bays later described as a "large, John Belushi-type character"; nonetheless, Megan Branman, the casting director for How I Met Your Mother, invited Harris to audition. He assumed that he was invited solely because the two were friends and did not believe he had a chance of winning the role. Harris later said: "Since I considered myself in the long shot, I didn't care that much, and I think that allowed a freedom." His audition centered on a scene playing laser tag, and Harris attempted a dive roll, accidentally knocking over a chair and slamming into a wall in the process. CBS executives enjoyed his playing and soon offered Harris the part. Before Harris' casting, Jim Parsons auditioned for the role. The character is named for a heroin dealer in the James Ellroy novel L.A. Confidential.

== Character ==
Barney Stinson is one of five main characters on How I Met Your Mother. He is a manipulative, oversexed businessman in his thirties who always wears a suit, likes women with "daddy issues" and is frequently willing to offer his (sometimes hypocritical) opinion. Throughout the earlier seasons, Barney is a huge womanizer, and has been described as a "high-functioning sociopath" by his best friend, Ted Mosby (Josh Radnor). Barney has a plethora of strategies and rules designed to meet women, sleep with them, and discard them. Through several seasons of the show, four of the main characters are couples, as Ted began dating Robin Scherbatsky (Cobie Smulders) and Ted's roommate Marshall Eriksen (Jason Segel) becomes engaged and later married to Lily Aldrin (Alyson Hannigan). This leaves Barney the only single character, and, according to Harris, Barney is "resentful" that the other characters have paired up. Later on, in season 5, he dates Robin. They end up breaking up not long after, once they both realize they are making one another miserable.

Harris describes Barney as a man who "likes to create crazy situations and then sit back and watch it all go down." He is an opportunist who manipulates any situation so that it goes his way. He is also highly competitive, and will take on "challenges" to complete outlandish tasks in order to prove his worth by often announcing "Challenge Accepted". He is proud and stubborn, and attempts to stand by his word no matter what. In "I Heart NJ", for example, he refuses to put down his fist unless someone offers him a fist bump. By the end of the episode, he has the same fist elevated in a sling after struggling to keep his fist up throughout the episode. In "Lucky Penny", when the others do not believe that he can run the New York City Marathon the next day without training, Barney immediately agrees to do so. Although he succeeds, he is unable to walk afterwards. Although he thinks of himself as worldly, Barney is sometimes extremely naive, believing many lies his mother told him well into adulthood, such as believing that Bob Barker is his father.

Barney, like Harris himself, is an illusionist. His favorite types of magic tricks involve fire, as seen in the tenth episode of the second season, "Single Stamina" and in the fourth episode of the fourth season, "Intervention". Barney uses magic tricks mostly to pick up women. His most common method of picking up women is telling them elaborate lies about himself, often using an alias. Many of his schemes for picking up women are in a book he has written called "The Playbook", which is exposed in the episode "The Playbook". He has commitment issues, as evidenced in his reluctance to put a label on his relationship with Robin and the fact that she is one of the few women he has actually dated since the show started.

Barney is very well-connected and is the most affluent member of the group. He frequently buys expensive items—such as a last-minute plane ticket to San Francisco, thousands of dollars in postage stamps, or two televisions specifically for smashing in frustration—in the spur of the moment. He is also something of a metrosexual; he waxes his chest, enjoys manicures and has an extensive knowledge of designer labels and gourmet food. However, he is also seen to have a gambling problem that he occasionally gets under control, only to relapse as seen in several episodes such as "Atlantic City", where he has gambling buddies in the Chinese Triad, and "Monday Night Football".

Although The Early Show described him as "Utterly devoid of morality", Barney lives by the "Bro Code", his own code of ethics. Despite his overall questionable character, according to creator Craig Thomas, Barney is "a pretty fragile character who's really afraid of being alone. He just wants people to like him, to be important to people, and to have disciples who follow his word." He has displayed a softer, kinder side on several occasions, however, such as preventing Marshall from sleeping with other women when he and Lily break up, and persuading Lily to come back to Marshall.

In "The Slutty Pumpkin Returns", Barney finds out he is one-quarter Canadian due to his grandmother's Canadian ancestry, much to his horror and embarrassment.

Throughout the series, one major character development is apparent in Barney: At the beginning of the show, his character is a womanizer who completely objectifies sex and women and wants nothing to do with dating and relationships. Although he does date Robin in Season 5, he resumes his promiscuous lifestyle immediately after they break up. In Seasons 6 and 7, however, he begins to confront his personal issues, like his relationship with his estranged father and his fear of commitment. By the time late Season 7 rolls around, Barney has finally "grown up," and has now warmed to the idea of a commitment and marriage, culminating in his proposal to his girlfriend, Quinn. Although he briefly retreats to his escapades after he and Quinn break up, he does make one major final leap in his maturity when he burns The Playbook and proposes to Robin in Season 8's two-part episode "The Final Page," after finally admitting to himself that he is still in love with her. Robin accepts and they plan their wedding in the second half of the season.

The final season revolves around Barney and Robin's wedding weekend. After some apprehension on both their parts, they get married in "The End of the Aisle" after he vows to always be honest with her. The series finale, "Last Forever", reveals that, three years after their wedding, they get divorced because Robin's hectic travel schedule prevents them from spending any time together. Barney returns to a lifestyle of meaningless sex with multiple women for several years afterward, reasoning that if he could not form a lasting relationship with Robin it was not going to happen with anyone else, until he gets one of his one-night stands pregnant. He hates the idea of being a father until the day his child – a girl named Ellie – is born. He falls in love with her at first sight and becomes a devoted father, turning away from his player lifestyle for good. The series' alternate ending implies that following Ted's wedding, Barney and Robin eventually got back together.

In the spinoff How I Met Your Father, during the episode "Daddy", which takes place in 2022, main character Sophie Tompkins (Hilary Duff) hits Barney's car (with a license plate reading "LGNDRY", a nod to his catchphrase, "Legendary"). He has attempted to stop womanizing by telling every woman he meets that he is "in recovery" and apologizing if he tricked them into having sex with him at some point in the past; he also wears an ankle bracelet that delivers an electric shock every time he says something sexually inappropriate. Seeing Sophie's distress, he offers to cover the damages to the car if she tells him her problem, and she admits her fears of dating a man who could be her father. Barney bonds with Sophie over growing up without a father, and inspires her to start looking for hers, but cautions that doing so may not entirely resolve her issues.

=== Childhood and family ===
A few references have been offered to identify Barney's birthday: In "Natural History", Barney claims he was six years old on July 23, 1981. This puts his birthday somewhere between July 24, 1974 and July 23, 1975; in "Zoo or False", Ted says Barney was born seven years after the Moon landing (which occurred in July 1969), In "Columns" set in 2007, Barney gives his age as 31, further confirming his birth year is 1976. In "The Drunk Train" Marshall states Barney is a Scorpio which places his birthday between October 23 and November 21, 1976.

He was raised in Port Richmond, Staten Island, by his mother Loretta (younger version voiced by Megan Mullally, played by Frances Conroy), who was apparently very promiscuous. His father proved to be an ongoing mystery in the series. When Barney was young, he asked his mother who his father was, and as The Price Is Right happened to be on TV at the time, she pointed to Bob Barker and replied, "Oh, I don't know. That guy." Barney believed the lie wholeheartedly. Years later, as portrayed in the season 2 episode "Showdown", he appears on The Price Is Right with the intention of naming Barker as his father on national television until he panics at the last minute and cannot go through with it. As a child, Barney was terrible at sports, and from various episodes, it is shown he had few friends (one scene shows that no one attended his birthday party). In the episode "The Leap," Lily reveals that Barney planned on being a violinist when he was young.

In "Natural History", Barney finds out that a man named Jerome Whittaker, whom Barney believed to be his uncle, signed a form claiming to be Barney's father. Barney finally meets Jerome (John Lithgow) again in the episode "Legendaddy" and learns that he is in fact his father. Upon meeting, Jerome feels pressured to act like the hard-partying womanizer he once was in order to impress Barney, and also because Barney refuses to see him any other way. Barney eventually breaks down and accuses Jerome of walking out on him. Jerome, who can offer no excuse, apologizes and pleads with Barney to allow him to be a part of his life. Later in the sixth season, in "Hopeless", Jerome tries to impress Barney by acting like his old self, but later reveals he was just pretending. Barney, nevertheless, willingly listens to advice from Jerome about settling down. Barney also learns of his Canadian heritage, when he finds out that Jerome's mother was born in Manitoba. In the How I Met Your Father episode "Daddy", Barney reveals that Jerome is helping him raise his daughter Ellie, and credits both of them for inspiring him to be a better man for his family.

Barney has three half-siblings: James (played by Wayne Brady), from his mother's side, a gay African American who is married to a man, with whom he has an adopted son and daughter (as revealed in the season seven episode "The Rebound Girl"); Carly (played by Ashley Benson), a university student from his father's side, whom Ted dates in the episode "Ring Up!", and Jerome Jr. (JJ), from his father's side, who is 11. He also has a female cousin named Leslie, with whom he accidentally grinds in a nightclub, as seen in the episode "Okay Awesome".

=== Education ===
Throughout the series Barney has claimed to have attended MIT; In the final season, Barney explains that MIT is an acronym for the Magicians Institute of Teaneck, not the Massachusetts Institute of Technology. He has worn a Cornell Big Red T-shirt, indicating that he may have gone there, instead, but he was wearing this shirt at Ted's apartment, in Ted's bed, and was previously seen in Ted's apartment wearing a suit. Therefore it is also possible that Ted attended Cornell, and Barney was borrowing Ted's shirt while he was sick. As evidenced in Season 2 "Atlantic City", Barney learned at least conversational Korean, both Mandarin and Cantonese, Japanese, as well as some French. He's also spoken Ukrainian (actually Russian) to his tailor. His musical skills include playing the drums, piano and violin, dancing the tango, and singing. He is also skilled at juggling and laser tag.

=== Adult life prior to 2005 ("Pilot") ===
"Game Night" reveals that Barney had once been an innocent, idealistic young man who wanted to join the Peace Corps with his first serious girlfriend, Shannon (Katie Walder). When she left him for a suit-wearing womanizer, James arranged for the 23-year-old Barney to lose his virginity to their mother's friend, Rhonda "the Man Maker" French (Stephanie Faracy). After he slept with Rhonda and was led to believe he satisfied her, he became a similarly suit-wearing womanizer, even going so far as to adopt some of his rival's catchphrases. He lives by a strict code known as the Bro Code.

Barney is also revealed to have had a gambling problem, enabled by his mother, who is a bookmaker. However, he assures the group that it is not a problem because he is so good at it. He revealed in "Atlantic City" that he lost his entire life savings playing a Chinese game. He has also apparently lost every one of his many bets on the Super Bowl. He will go to any lengths to win a bet, even if it takes one year for just $10.

=== In the series (2005–2014) ===
While Barney's softer, more generous side is not often apparent, it is not always relegated to flashbacks. When Marshall and Lily break their engagement in season one, Barney lures women away from Marshall so that he can remain faithful to the woman he truly loves. It is revealed that it was Barney who convinced Lily to come back to New York, even buying her a plane ticket home. Barney's relationship with women evolves throughout the series; in the later seasons, he begins to desire a more conventional relationship, as evidenced by his subsequent proposals to both Quinn Garvey and Robin Scherbatsky. He is also known to write a blog. In an allusion to Harris' role in Doogie Howser, M.D., the music played during his blogging sessions is the theme song from the show.

=== Career ===
Throughout the series, Barney frequently refuses to say what he does for a living, brushing off any questions about his job with a dismissive "Please."

Barney is apparently quite wealthy, He lives in an upscale apartment he calls the Fortress of Barnitude, located at 100 on an unspecified street, and is rich enough to own two 300 inch televisions shipped from Japan as well as expensive memorabilia, including an Imperial Stormtrooper costume from the Star Wars films. Barney is also shown to be a fan of the rock groups AC/DC, Van Halen and Bon Jovi.

In his blog, he writes that he is the Director of WHO DID THIS. The company he works for, Altrucell, advertises itself as the world's largest producer of the felt covers of tennis balls; however, Future Ted implies that the company's main profits come from other, less innocent sources, such as logging, oil drilling, small arms, tobacco farming and missile construction. Barney states in "Cupcake" that, as a lawyer for Altrucell, Marshall would make more money in three months than he and Lily make in a year because his company has so many lawsuits against it. In the season 3 episode "The Bracket," he says that he is good enough at lying to avoid perjury charges. As of Season 4, his company is involved in a hostile takeover of Goliath National Bank (GNB) and consequently shifts him to the management team of the bank, but he remains a powerful executive and continues to use the same office he has had since it was first shown in Season 1. Despite this, he has suggested there is the possibility he will one day wash up on shore with no teeth or fingerprints and supposedly has come under attack by ninjas in the past during work. In Season 4, during the episode "Happily Ever After", Barney states to a woman that he is an "Attorney in Law", though this was probably just part of a pick-up line as he immediately followed it with "Let's talk about getting you off". His video resume was published in Season 4 episode "The Possimpible". In a season 8 episode, it was implied that the full extent of Barney's career might never be revealed.

In the Season 9 episode "Unpause", he drunkenly reveals that his job is to "Provide Legal Exculpation And Sign Everything" (P.L.E.A.S.E.), setting him up to be the fall guy for his company's nefarious activities. Unknown to his company, he has been conspiring with the federal government as part of a long-term plan to get revenge on his boss, who stole his girlfriend prior to the start of the series.

=== Friends ===
==== Ted Mosby ====
Ted is Barney's self-proclaimed best friend and "wing man". They meet in 2001 at MacLaren's, and Barney takes it upon himself to "teach Ted how to live". While Ted is often annoyed by Barney's antics, he considers him a good friend, and in "Miracles," says that Barney is like a brother to him. Their friendship has been tested, however; in "The Goat", Ted finds out that Barney and Robin slept together and ends their friendship, and refuses to speak to him for several episodes. In the third-season finale, "Miracles", however, Ted forgives Barney after Barney severely injures himself while trying to help him. They remain an important part of each other's lives for the rest of the series, with Barney comforting Ted after he is left at the altar in "Shelter Island" and Ted teaching Barney how to be a good boyfriend to Robin in "Robin 101". Ted is the best man at Barney's wedding, and, along with the other main characters, is present for the birth of his child.

==== Marshall Eriksen ====
Barney meets Marshall around the same time as Ted, and takes it upon himself to give Marshall unwanted advice on picking up women. While Marshall makes fun of Barney's promiscuity and ethical lapses, Barney has helped him many times throughout the series. For example, Barney gets him an internship at Altrucell in "Life Among the Gorillas", keeps him from sleeping with other women in "The Scorpion and the Toad", persuades Lily to come back to him in "Bachelor Party", and gets him a job at Goliath National Bank in "The Best Burger in New York". Barney is "co-best man" with Ted at Marshall's wedding. Along with the other main characters, Marshall is present for the birth of Barney's daughter. In the episode "Slap Bet", Barney loses a bet with Marshall and agrees to let Marshall slap him five times at random occasions "throughout eternity". This is later extended to eight slaps in the episode "Disaster Averted". Marshall administers these slaps in the episodes "Slap Bet", "Stuff", "Slapsgiving", "Slapsgiving 2: Revenge of the Slap", "Slapsgiving 3: Slappointment in Slapmarra", and "The End of the Aisle".

==== Lily Aldrin ====
Barney makes many unwelcome sexual advances toward Lily throughout the series, and frequently implies that Lily is secretly attracted to him, despite all evidence to the contrary. Nevertheless, he considers Lily a confidante, seeking her advice on winning Robin over and telling her deeply personal secrets, such as his failed ambition to be a concert violinist. He also admires her skill at lying and manipulating people, considering it to be on par with his own. While Lily calls Barney "the world's biggest pervert" and a "womanizing creep", she also considers him one of her best friends. Throughout the series, it is evident that while Barney is good friends with Ted and Marshall, Lily is really the one who helps him most as a person. Along with the other main characters, Lily is present for the birth of Barney's daughter.

=== Romantic relationships ===
==== Robin Scherbatsky ====
Barney and Robin start out as friends, but he falls in love with her after they impulsively sleep together in "Sandcastles in the Sand". Throughout Season 4, he struggles with his feelings for her, until they finally get together in the season finale "The Leap". They become a full-fledged couple in season 5, but they break up in "The Rough Patch" when they find that they are making each other miserable. They never truly get over each other, however, even while they are dating other people. In the eighth season, he launches an elaborate plan to win Robin's heart (encouraged by Ted's future wife) that ends with Barney proposing to her. She accepts, and they get engaged. The final season revolves around their wedding weekend. After much doubt and soul-searching, they get married in "The End of the Aisle". The series finale, "Last Forever", reveals that, after three years of marriage, they get divorced because Robin's work schedule prevents them from spending any time together. They do not see each other again for several years, until Ted's wedding; the series' alternate ending implies that following Ted's wedding, Barney and Robin eventually got back together. This shows that Barney always loved Robin and always will as she is the one who got him to settle down in the first place and that it is never too late for them.

==== Others ====
Barney has two other serious girlfriends throughout the series: Nora (Nazanin Boniadi), on whom he cheats with Robin, and ends the relationship with in hopes Robin would do the same with her boyfriend at the time, Kevin. However, he is left broken hearted when he finds out that Robin chose to stay with Kevin. The other serious relationship of Barney was with Quinn (Becki Newton), a stripper to whom he proposes, but with whom he breaks up upon realizing that they do not trust each other.

== Appearances outside How I Met Your Mother ==
In 2008, the book The Bro Code, ostensibly written by Barney, was published. Three other books ostensibly written by Barney, Bro on the Go (2009), The Playbook (2010), and Bro Code for Parents: What to Expect When You're Awesome (2012), were also published.

In 2010, Barney was featured in a Super Bowl commercial that showed him in the stands at the Super Bowl with a sign stating "Hey Ladies Call Barney Stinson 1-877-987-6401." A recorded message by Neil Patrick Harris was played if the number was dialed.

Harris appeared as Barney alongside Ted in Family Guy in a cutaway gag.

== Catchphrases ==
In the show's pilot, Barney first utters the phrase, "Suit up!", as he tells others to dress like him to go out. The phrase "Suit up!" came from an ad for a suit sale in a later episode about his past with Shannon. According to creator Thomas, this is a sign that Barney "thought of his suit as some kind of superhero outfit that separated him from the pack." The phrase is repeated in many episodes, and is often modified to fit whatever clothing Barney is wearing, such as "Flight suit up", "Snow suit up", and even "Birthday suit up". He also uses the word "awesome" to describe anything that he finds remotely pleasing, and invents different kinds of "high-fives" for every occasion. Barney's invented high-fives include "The Self-Five" (in which Barney high-fives himself), "The Prayer-Five" (in which Barney and Robin discreetly move their hands in a motion replicating the Sign of the Cross -up, down, left, right- before making contact with the backs of their hands while sitting in a pastor's office), and "The Almighty-Five" (in which Barney supposedly receives a high-five from God himself).

However, Barney's arguably most famous catch phrase is "Legendary!" which he uses to describe anything and everything fun and exciting (In fact, Ted says that he over-uses it). When saying something is legendary, he typically says "it's going to be Legen... wait for it... dary! Legendary!" He also says "wait for it" quite often, and uses the word "Nice" to express when he enjoys something or someone.

In the show Barney frequently approaches attractive women with Ted in tow and asks "Haaaaave you met Ted?" as a way to start a conversation with strangers. Thomas says that this phrase is based in real life, as a one-time friend of his often used a similar line to meet women. He is also prone to saying "Daddy's Home" as either a chat-up line or for grand entrances, and "True Story" as an ending to stories or theories that are generally erroneous.

Barney often uses the phrase "Challenge accepted" when someone mentions an outlandish task that supposedly cannot be done; he takes this as a personal challenge and attempts, usually successfully, to perform the task.

== Reception ==
According to The Early Show, Barney was one of the main reasons that the show was a success. Maclean's stated that Barney is the show's most popular character and explains that the most likeable characters are often those with the best catchphrases. In 2006, TV Land named Barney's "Suit Up" one of the 100 Best Catchphrases. Barney's signature phrase is one of only four from contemporary television shows, as writers are now less likely to have a character repeat a phrase in many episodes. In June 2010, Entertainment Weekly named him one of the 100 Greatest Characters of the Last 20 Years. Paste included him in their list of the 20 Best Characters of 2011, ranking him No. 4.

From 2007 to 2010, Harris was nominated for a Primetime Emmy for Outstanding Supporting Actor in a Comedy Series for his work playing Barney. In 2008, Fireside published The Bro Code. Ostensibly written by Stinson, although actually penned by Matt Kuhn, a writer for the show, the book reveals the code by which the character supposedly lives his life (though he has been shown disregarding and/or violating a large portion of the articles in the book). Oxford Dictionaries recognized Stinson as "the quintessence of a certain iteration of the contemporary bro" and noted how his language uses the word literally.

== Bibliography ==
- Stinson, Barney (2008). The Bro Code. New York: Fireside. ISBN 978-1-4391-1000-3.
- Stinson, Barney (2009). Bro on the Go. New York: Fireside. ISBN 978-1-4391-7313-8.
- Stinson, Barney (2010). The Playbook: Suit up. Score chicks. Be awesome. New York: Touchstone. ISBN 978-1-4391-9683-0.
