= Marshall Eriksen =

Fictional character on the CBS sitcom How I Met Your Mother

- How I Met Your Mother character
- Jason Segel as Marshall Eriksen
- First appearance: "Pilot"
- Last appearance: "Last Forever"
- Created by: Carter Bays; Craig Thomas
- Portrayed by: Jason Segel; Koby Rouviere (8-years-old)

In-universe information
- Gender: Male
- Occupation: Lawyer (2005–2018); Judge (2018–); New York State Supreme Court Judge (2021– )
- Family: Marvin Eriksen (father, deceased); Judy Eriksen (mother)
- Spouse: Lily Aldrin (m. 2007)
- Children: Marvin Waitforit Eriksen; Daisy Eriksen unnamed third child
- Nationality: American

Marshall Eriksen is a fictional character on the CBS sitcom How I Met Your Mother, portrayed by Jason Segel. Series co-creator Craig Thomas explained that he based Marshall and Lily on himself and his wife Rebecca.

== Character overview ==
The series revolves around the adventures of the five main characters: Ted Mosby (Josh Radnor) and his best friend Marshall, his friend and Marshall's girlfriend (later fiancee and wife) Lily Aldrin (Alyson Hannigan), friend Barney Stinson (Neil Patrick Harris) and friend (and future love interest and wife to Barney Stinson) Robin Scherbatsky (Cobie Smulders).

Marshall met Ted and Lily during their freshman year at Wesleyan University in 1996 (though in Season 4, the diploma in Marshall's office at Goliath National Bank says Ohio Wesleyan University), and they moved into an apartment in New York City together after graduation. In the show's pilot episode, he proposes to Lily, inspiring Ted to start looking for the love of his life.

Marshall is fascinated by the paranormal, and has absolute faith that mythical creatures such as Sasquatch and the Loch Ness Monster are real. He has even discovered a paranormal event himself: a bizarre creature he names "the cockamouse". He is also a huge fan of the Minnesota Vikings, much like his father. He is a fan of the Minnesota Twins and New York Mets.

Although very few references were made to identify Marshall's birthday, it can be assumed he was in the same school year as best friend and roommate Ted Mosby and then-girlfriend Lily Aldrin. In "The Yips" Marshall says he is 29. This episode aired in November 2007. This confirms Marshall's birth year to be either 1977 or 1978. Ted turned 30 on April 25, 2008 in "The Goat". The dialogue in this episode implies that Lily, Marshall and Robin have not yet reached this milestone. In "Glitter", Lily says Marshall is 384 months old, thus 32 years, 1 week, 1 day and 21 hours old. Since the episode plays somewhere between November 9 (the date the previous episode played in) and November 24, 2010 (the date the next episode plays in) it can only be concluded that he was born between November 2 and November 14, 1978.

=== Life before first episode ===
Marshall was born and raised in St. Cloud, Minnesota, the youngest of three brothers. His last name, the fact that he is from Minnesota and his references to lutefisk suggests that he might be a Scandinavian American. He has been shown to be extremely close to his family, particularly his father, Marvin (Bill Fagerbakke). His relationships with his two older brothers, Marvin, Jr. and Marcus, was depicted in several episodes as involving pranks and brutal fighting matches when they were teenagers. By the time the series begins, both of his brothers are married and have started families. It was depicted that his brothers were the ones who gave Marshall his very first car, a Pontiac Fiero, which had a cassette single stuck in it containing the song "I'm Gonna Be (500 Miles)".

In an episode it's shown Marshall starts smoking while still in high school and struggles to stop until his children are born.

After graduating from Tarkenton St. Cloud high school (as seen in Desperation Day), Marshall attended and received his B.A. from Wesleyan University. He met both Lily and Ted during the move-in process. Ted was his first roommate in college. Marshall is shown to frequently smoke marijuana, though in the show, Future Ted refers to this as "eating a sandwich" in order to hide their past drug use from his children. In fact, Marshall is shown to have smoked marijuana before initially meeting Ted and confuses him for the dean of the school. Marshall is also shown to enjoy drinking to the point of intoxication in college. One of those times, he is involved in a hazing where he becomes so drunk that he streaks and proclaims himself "Beercules" following the drinking game "Edward 40-Hands", a reference to the film Edward Scissorhands, but instead of scissors for hands, the participant tapes 40 fl. oz. drinks to their hands.

Marshall and Ted became good friends after this. During a break during school, Marshall plans to drive back to Minnesota in his Fiero. Marshall offers Ted a ride to his own home in Shaker Heights saying that it is on the way, which Ted eventually accepts. They bond during a blizzard and over the song "I'm Gonna Be (500 Miles)". Ted's friendship with Marshall is shown to help strengthen Lily and Marshall's early relationship, by him inviting her into their first roommate photo, Ted encouraging Marshall to commit to Lily, despite Marshall not having much prior relationship experience. Ted and Marshall would also take frequent roadtrips to Chicago to get pizza from their favorite shop. They also begin their tradition of watching the original Star Wars trilogy while in school together.

Marshall met Lily during the move-in process, when Lily was determined to meet him and found his room. She asked him to install her stereo for her and they were in love at first sight. They exclusively date through college, even when she studies abroad in Paris. Their nicknames for each other are "Lily-pad" and "Marsh-mallow".

After graduating, Marshall and Ted move in together into the apartment in New York. Marshall is initially terrified of living in a large city, though he eventually overcomes his fear. He takes several years off, working in a clothing store, before attending Columbia University Law School to receive his Juris Doctor (J.D.).

=== How I Met Your Mother ===
During the pilot episode, Marshall proposes to Lily. Throughout the series, his relationship with Lily progresses through their engagement, their break up when she decides to move to San Francisco for an art fellowship, Lily's eventual return to New York City and their attempt at a friendship outside of a romantic relationship, their reconciliation and re-engagement, their wedding, and finally their marriage.

==== Initial engagement ====
Marshall and Lily are initially engaged during the first season. Their engagement is what initially prompts Ted to begin pursuing marriage for himself.

Marshall at times is shown to feel left out of the hijinks that Ted and Barney get into without him, going so far as to drive to Philadelphia to have a "legendary" adventure with them.

Marshall is shown to be completely committed in spite of his sadness at being left out of Ted and Barney's "single man" shenanigans. In Best Prom Ever, he sneaks into a high school prom in order to provide Lily with sheet music for the song they want to dance to at their wedding, "Good Feeling" from the Violent Femmes album.

During this period, the couple is generally happy, but the instability of their engagement and relationship is foreshadowed in several episodes. In "Okay Awesome", Marshall is shown to be jealous of the fun that Barney and Ted have by going out to clubs while Lily wants to have a "grown up" wine and cheese party with other couples. In "Belly Full of Turkey", the couple go to Minnesota to visit Marshall's family for Thanksgiving. There, Lily vocalizes that she does not want to change her name, that she is hesitant about starting a family with Marshall, and that the couple are not on the same page about where they would raise their family if they chose to have children. In "Zip, Zip, Zip", Marshall and Lily are trapped in the apartment bathroom and openly discuss that they are sad about no longer having new milestones. This period of their relationship ends in the first season finale, "Come On", when Marshall discovers that Lily interviewed for an art fellowship in San Francisco. They have a fight, during which Lily claims that she was never going to actually take the fellowship, but due to Marshall's comments during the fight, she decides that she needed to take a break from the relationship in order to pursue her dream as an artist.

During this time, it was demonstrated that Marshall and Lily have a psychic connection and are able to communicate with each other through thought.

==== Break-up and Lily's return to New York ====
The second season begins with Marshall dealing with the break-up of his long-term relationship and engagement. He was shown to be extremely depressed during the first few months post-break-up. He becomes obsessed with credit card bills that are still sent to their apartment. This obsession leads him to believe that Lily returned to New York and didn't tell him, causing him to believe that she does not want to get back together. When he goes to a New York hotel shown on her credit card bill to confront her and the man that had answered the phone when he had called their room, he discovers that Lily had not returned, but had been a victim of identity fraud. This allows him to let go of the relationship.

He eventually tries dating, though most of his attempts are stymied by his friend Barney Stinson, who is later revealed to be intentionally sabotaging these attempts in order to ensure the reunification of Marshall and Lily.

Marshall, while single, misses parts of being in a relationship, such as having someone to attend concerts with and going to brunch, which his friends tell him is something that can only be done when in a couple. Marshall begins a "bromance" with his friend and fellow law student, Brad Morris (Joe Manganiello), who had also recently gone through a break-up. Marshall thinks that Brad is becoming too romantic for the relationship, which culminates in Marshall reluctantly agreeing to attend a wedding with him, only to arrive in front of Brad's apartment to see him with flowers. Marshall assumes that the flowers are for him and panics, but Brad reveals that he had gotten back together with his recent break-up.

When Marshall encountered Lily after her return to New York City, Lily proposed they get back together, saying that leaving him was a mistake and that she still loves him. Marshall refused and said that he also needed time to discover who he is outside the relationship.

Marshall managed to date one woman, a barista, who his friends claimed has "crazy eyes". She tells him several outlandish stories, which are revealed to be true and caused by Lily, who is still obsessed with Marshall. At the end of their date, it is revealed that Lily had broken into the apartment to sabotage the date with a picture of Marshall and Lily together. This culminates with them making up and getting back together.

==== Second engagement and wedding ====
After reconciling, Marshall and Lily decide to elope in Atlantic City in order to avoid the judgment of Marshall's family for Lily having left him. They decide not to go through with it at the last moment and want to instead have a celebration with their families and friends present.

Marshall's friendship are further explored during this time in the episode "Slap Bet". Marshall agrees to a bet with Barney about the reason Robin doesn't like malls. Marshall, being from Minnesota, believes that Robin doesn't like malls because she was married in one, as some people had done in the Mall of America. This results in Marshall being given several slaps which he inflict upon Barney throughout the series, because, although Robin was not married at a mall, Barney was incorrect that she had been in a pornographic film.

During this time, Marshall's first car dies. He reminisces with his friends about the times that they all shared in the car and is reluctant to scrap the vehicle. He reveals that he is unhappy with the corporate job he had been working and felt that only his old, beaten car kept him connected with the kind of man that he wanted to be.

Toward the end of the second season, before the wedding, when Ted is planning to move in with his girlfriend, Robin, it is shown that most of the possessions in the apartment belonged to Ted. Marshall and Lily, while still wanting to get married, learn that they are somewhat dependent on Ted. The couple is relieved when Ted ultimately decides not to move in with Robin and returns to the apartment.

On the day of their wedding, Marshall begins to have anxiety about the day and shave his head. To relieve some of the stress of the day, Marshall and Lily have a two ceremonies; first, one that is private and only their closest friends attend and the second one which is in before all of their guests.

==== Post-wedding ====
After their wedding, Marshall and Lily continue to live with Ted in the apartment for some time until they decide that they need to move out to be on their own. In "I'm Not That Guy" Marshall ends up taking a job working at another corporate position, though he is unhappy about doing so. He takes the job instead of pursuing his dream of working in environmental law after being offered his dream job working for the Natural Resources Defense Council in order to provide for Lily, who had helped to support him during law school on her kindergarten teacher's salary. He was informed that his only client at the corporate office would be an amusement park, which is shown to be equally awful as the other clients of the office.

With his new salary, Marshall believes that he is able to afford a new home and makes plans with Lily to purchase an apartment in "Dowisetrepla". He finds out that Lily has massive credit card debt, which negatively affects their ability to get a good interest rate on a mortgage. They still decide to get the mortgage to afford the apartment, learn that "DOWISETREPLA" stands for "DOwn WInd of the SEwage TREatment PLAnt", which causes the area to reek of sewage when it is running during the week. Upon their initial move in to the apartment, they also discover that it is crooked and they temporarily move back in with Ted while the floors are levelled.

Marshall goes through several more life milestones. In "Spoiler Alert", he ends up passing the bar; then he ends up snapping when confronting his boss at the law office, resulting in Marshall quitting his job in "The Chain of Screaming".

Marshall also confronts Ted about his behavior. Ted attempting to pursue a married woman deeply offends Marshall now that he is married.

Toward the beginning of season 4, it is revealed that Barney has gotten a job for Marshall working the fictional Goliath National Bank (GNB). Lily and Marshall also discuss having a baby; initially Lily doesn't believe they are ready and Marshall does, but while working for GNB Marshall is extremely busy and while having to balance work with taking care of a drunken Lily, he realizes that he doesn't believe they are ready at that time and they decide to wait.

During this period of his life, Marshall reveals that he hates living in a small apartment in New York when visiting Ted's fiancee's home in New Jersey. He also reveals that he cannot fantasize about women other than Lily without first imagining that she has died and he has gone through a grieving process. It is shown in "The Sexless Innkeeper" that Lily and Marshall are terrible hosts during "couple's nights". Marshall is apparently relegated to picking the cheese, because Lily is a gifted chef; Marshall takes this too far and is obsessed with the gouda during a night spent with Robin and Barney.

It is also shown that Ted somewhat resents Lily, because Marshall and Lily have become inseparable. Marshall is unable or unwilling to take road trips with Ted the way they would when they were both unmarried.

==== Attempts at pregnancy and death of Marshall's father ====
Eventually, Marshall and Lily decide to start trying for a baby. They agree to only do so once they have seen a doppelganger for each of their friends. Marshall decides that when Lily sees someone who looks nothing like Barney, however, and decides that it is his doppelganger, to not tell her and that it must mean that she is ready. They make this agreement during the formation of their friend group's tradition of going to "Robots vs Wrestlers".

Marshall's relationship with his father is depicted around this time as being overly close. Lily was angered when she learned that Marshall had told his father that they were trying to conceive. Marshall realizes that while he loves his father and their relationship, he should keep some details of his private married life from him.

Marshall realizes that he would like his children to be boys, due to some internalized misogyny after recalling how he spoke to and treated girls when he was in high school and various strippers he has seen with Barney. Marshall's father gives him advice on how to only conceive boys, based on their family traditions. Marshall learned that Lily had hoped for a girl and was trying her own absurd methods for guaranteeing a girl; they decide not to try to influence the sex of the baby while trying to conceive.

After trying for several months, Marshall and Lily to see a specialist hoping that they won't have issues conceiving. This is where they ultimately see Barney's true doppelganger, a gynecologist. Marshall is able to have an open and frank discussion about his worries with fertility with his parents, which he is later grateful to Lily for being able to have. They learn that they have no fertility issues.

The same day that they learn that they have no fertility issues, Marshall's father passes away from a heart attack. When Marvin dies Marshall is devastated, and takes a long time to recover; not to mention that during the episode "Last Words" he struggles with remembering what Marvin's last words were to him. After the funeral, Marshall temporarily regresses to his teenage personality while staying with his mother under the guise of helping her to emotionally recover from Marvin's death.

Upon returning to New York, Marshall and Lily take a break from attempting to conceive, though by the season 6 finale, "Challenge Accepted", Lily is pregnant. Marshall leaves his job at GNB, hoping to start his career working in environmental law.

==== Pregnancy ====
After Marshall finds out that Lily is pregnant, he begins a new job working in an environmental law office. They begin to prepare their apartment for the baby's arrival and learn that they will be having a boy. During this time, Lily's paternal grandparents gift them their home on Long Island and despite Marshall wanting to move out of New York City to raise their children, they decide not to make any major decisions while Lily is having "pregnancy brain". They do eventually begin moving into the home, much to the chagrin of their friends. At this time, Lily's father also moves in with them.

After realizing that they do not enjoy living in the home on Long Island, Marshall and Lily are informed by Ted that they were never taken off the lease. Ted decided to move out of the apartment and gifts it to them. They happily move back, taking Ted's bedroom and converting Marshall's old room into the baby's nursery.

Toward the end of Lily's pregnancy, Marshall demonstrates his anxiety about beginning parenthood; he panics about their (perceived) lack of preparation for when the baby comes. Lily is frustrated by this and has him sent on a trip to Atlantic City with Barney, so that she can have some quiet time before the baby comes. She goes into labor while Marshall is away.

==== Beginning of parenthood and dream job ====
Marshall is able to return to New York in time for the birth of their son, whom they name after Marshall's late father, Marvin. Marshall also promised Barney that they would give Marvin the middle name "Wait-for-it". After returning home from the hospital, Marshall and Lily institute a new rule that their friends cannot come them with personal problems unless they are an 8 out of 10 or higher; this results in the couple not being aware of the struggles in their friends' lives, which the come to regret and rescind the rule after trying to find out whom they will appoint to be Marvin's godparents.

During this time, they agree to hire Lily's father Mickey as Marvin's nanny after Mickey recounts to Lily how he took care of her as a stay-at-home parent when she was young.

Marshall, now working his dream job, starts having new challenges there as well. He learns that his boss believes that the environment is already too devastated to save, so Marshall, to save the planet for his newborn son, marshals the office into being more aggressive when suing a pharmaceutical company. He also learns that he is not a credible reference, because he is too willing to approve of others; he learns this when he is a reference for his friend Brad, who actually works for the adverse pharmaceutical company on their big case and steals some of their work for the case. In the show, this is shown to be bad for Marshall's case, but in actuality, would have been detrimental for the pharmaceutical company under the Laws of Civil Procedure disallowing this type of activity. Marshall was still able to overcome this and win at trial, but the judge awards him a pittance. This inspires him to seek a position as a judge in New York.

==== Career conflicts ====
After he submits his application for a judge position, Lily starts a new career as a fine-arts consultant for Ted's now ex-girlfriend's ex-husband, The Captain. Marshall was at first supportive, but once Lily started, she began to spend very little time at home and he grew frustrated with feeling like he was handling more than his fair share of the parenting responsibilities. After communicating this to Lily, she helps to even the parenting load more.

After this, Lily was offered an opportunity to move to Rome for a year to consult for the Captain. which she turns down so that Marshall can continue pursuing his dream job of working in environmental law. Marshall then reveals that since the disappointing outcome of the case, the office has functionally been shut down from a lack of clients. Marshall told her that he would be thrilled to move to Italy for a year, so Lily took the position.

Marshall's mother then learns from Lily that they are planning to move to Italy and she wants to spend time with her grandson before they leave. Marshall flies out to Minnesota where he receives a phone call granting him a recently vacated judgeship. In the last episode of the eighth season, he had applied to become a judge, deciding that this is where he will be able to make the most impact. He accepts the judgeship without discussing it with Lily. This effectively cancelled their plans to move to Italy.

==== Robin and Barney's wedding weekend ====
Marshall spent time on the road trying to find his way back to New York City from Minnesota with his new companion Daphne who worked for an oil corporation. They initially butted heads, but became friends during their travels, bonding over their shared frustration with Ted's step-father and sharing their struggles with various aspects of parenthood. While Marshall was separated from Lily, she missed him so much that she attached a tablet to a body pillow so that he could be present for their conversations. She named it "Marsh-pillow" after him.

He has several attempts at trying to hide that he took the judgeship from Lily while he is on the road, but ultimately comes clean to her when he arrives at the wedding venue. He decided to do so because he didn't want to have any secrets from his wife.

Lily and Marshall had a fight about him accepting the position without first discussing it with her. After Lily stormed out, Marshall considered the consequences of the fight by having a discussion with his internal monologue which he pictured as his father and Lily from 10 years ago. He came to the conclusion that he doesn't want to win a fight over their careers, but wants them both to be happy. Lily and Marshall reconciled and Lily told Marshall to take the job, even though he was willing to give it up for her to be happy. Marshall soon learned that this was because Lily found out that she was pregnant with their second child. Marshall decided that since she has provided him with so much happiness from having a family, that he wanted to make her happy and agreed to move to Rome for her and her career.

==== Post Stinson-Scherbatsky wedding ====
The series finale, "Last Forever", reveals that he worked for another corporate firm after returning to New York, until another judge's seat opened up for him. In the year 2020, he is elected to the New York State Supreme Court. It is also shown that Marshall and Lily have a daughter for their second child, whom they name Daisy after the flower whose pot Lily stuck her pregnancy test into. Additionally, it is revealed that Lily becomes pregnant a third time, though the gender and name are not revealed. This pregnancy happens around the same time as Robin and Barney's divorce. Marshall and Lily eventually help their oldest son, Marvin, move into Wesleyan where they met.

=== How I Met Your Father ===
Though Marshall does not himself appear in the How I Met Your Father spinoff, it is revealed that by 2022, his, Ted's and Lily's apartment has been sold to Jesse who is roommates with Sid who also own the swords left behind.

== Relationships ==
=== Lily Aldrin ===
Marshall and Lily meet on their first day of college and fall in love at first sight. They move in together and eventually get engaged. In the final episode of the first season, Lily breaks off their engagement to accept a painting fellowship in San Francisco. Marshall falls into a deep depression, but nevertheless refuses to take Lily back when she returns to New York. They eventually reconcile, however, and get married in the end of the second season. They initially have trouble conceiving a child, but Lily finally gets pregnant at the end of the sixth season, and gives birth to a boy, Marvin, at the end of the seventh.

Marshall and Lily are soul mates; they do virtually everything together, tell each other about every minute detail of their lives, and have only had sex with each other. They can even understand each other perfectly when they are seemingly incoherent, such as when Lily is trying to speak through bouts of morning sickness or when Marshall is speaking in pseudo-Italian gibberish.

Throughout the final season, which takes place over one weekend, Marshall travels with Marvin to the Farhampton Inn, where Robin and Barney are getting married. He struggles with telling Lily about his new job, as it conflicts with her dream of working as an art consultant in Rome. When he finds out she is pregnant with their second child, however, he gives up the judgeship and agrees to go to Rome with her and their new family.

By the end of the series, Marshall and Lily have three children: Marvin, Daisy, and a third child whose name is never revealed.

=== Ted Mosby ===
Marshall and Ted are college roommates and best friends. They first bonded during an ill-fated college road trip. Marshall and Lily consider Ted a part of their family, their "third Musketeer". Ted helps Marshall recover when he and Lily briefly break up. Along with the other main characters, Marshall is by Ted's side during every major event in his life, including a serious car accident, being left at the altar, and, finally, Ted's marriage to the titular Mother. Ted is best man at Marshall's wedding, and Marshall does the honors when Ted gets married in the series finale.

=== Barney Stinson ===
Marshall and Barney know each other through Ted, Barney having taken it upon himself to "teach them how to live". Along with the other characters, Marshall is both amused and horrified by Barney's promiscuity, deceptiveness and penchant for over-the-top schemes. Barney has shown himself to be a good friend, however; he gets Marshall an internship, persuades Lily to return to New York from San Francisco, and gets him his job at Goliath National Bank. Barney serves as "co-best man" (along with Ted) at Marshall and Lily's wedding. Along with Ted, Lily, and the Mother, Marshall is present for the birth of Barney's daughter in the series finale.

In the episode "Slap Bet", Barney loses a bet with Marshall and agrees to let Marshall slap him five times at random occasions "throughout eternity", which is later extended to eight. Marshall administers these slaps in the episodes "Slap Bet", "Stuff", "Slapsgiving", "Slapsgiving 2: Revenge of the Slap", "Disaster Averted", "Slapsgiving 3: Slappointment in Slapmarra", and "The End of the Aisle".

=== Robin Scherbatsky ===
During the first season, Marshall and Robin are friends, but he nevertheless advises Ted to forget about his unrequited love for her. When the two finally get together, however, he accepts her as a permanent part of the group, and continues to do so after they break up. When Robin quits her job, he and Lily take her in to live with them, and do so again in the seventh season after Robin breaks up with her boyfriend, Kevin (Kal Penn). Marshall asks her to move out when it becomes clear that Ted has unrequited feelings for her. However, he has an ongoing bet with Lily that Robin and Ted will end up together, which he eventually wins in 2030.

A running joke throughout the series is that Marshall believes that Robin is attracted to him, despite all evidence to the contrary.

When Robin briefly leaves the group in 2016, as portrayed in the series finale, Marshall resents her for it, but nevertheless welcomes her back four years later to celebrate Ted's wedding.
