= The Lighthouse (How I Met Your Mother) =

- How I Met Your Mother episode
- Episode no.: Season 9 Episode 8
- Directed by: Pamela Fryman
- Written by: Rachel Axler
- Original air date: November 4, 2013

Guest appearances
- Sherri Shepherd as Daphne; Frances Conroy as Loretta Stinson; Anna Camp as Cassie; Harry Groener as Clint; Cristine Rose as Virginia Mosby; Roger Bart as Curtis

Episode chronology
← Previous "No Questions Asked"	Next → "Platonish"
- How I Met Your Mother season 9

"The Lighthouse" is the eighth episode of the ninth season of the CBS sitcom How I Met Your Mother, and the 192nd episode overall.

== Plot ==
At 9 AM on Saturday, with 33 hours before the wedding, Barney is caught in the middle as Robin and Loretta continue to feud over the blouse Robin won in "The Poker Game". The three of them, joined by Lily, sit down to brunch together as Robin flaunts the blouse in Loretta's face and escalates the feud when she claims her mother makes better scrambled eggs than Loretta. Barney tries to avoid taking sides, but he and Lily and many of the inn's patrons praise Loretta's eggs. When Robin is unable to cook scrambled eggs herself, she concedes defeat. When Loretta questions how Robin will care for her children if she cannot cook, Robin admits that she cannot have children, something Barney reveals to his mother that Robin had confessed to him the previous fall. He tells Loretta that he is marrying Robin because she is more important to him than his desire to start a family one day. Lily tries to comfort Robin by suggesting that Robin's mother can show Loretta up when she arrives, only for Robin to reveal that her mother was too afraid to get on a plane and will not come to the wedding. Loretta, learning of this, makes peace with Robin and tells her to call her "Mom" from now on.

Marshall and Daphne stop overnight at Mrs. Mosby's house in Cleveland to wait out a storm. Clint, Ted's stepfather, notices the tension between them and tries to resolve it. They decline his offer and soon set off again, but they bicker even worse than before. Marshall states that maybe Clint was right, causing him to reveal himself as he had stowed away in hopes they would take his advice. He tries to help them but only makes matters worse and, after they both make fun of his efforts, he snaps and starts yelling. He demands they pull over so he can meditate and regain his calm. After Daphne tells Marshall that he will never get any respect until he starts taking charge, Marshall drives off without Clint and expresses that he is furious with how Daphne forced him to prematurely reveal his decision to become a judge to Lily. He takes charge of the music, forcing Daphne to listen to "I'm Gonna Be (500 Miles)"; when a horrified Daphne states she hates the song, Marshall replies, "Give it time."

Meanwhile, Lily has been furious since learning that Marshall has accepted a judgeship, constantly breaking glasses in fury whenever something court-related is mentioned. When Ted tries to go see a local lighthouse and the clerk will not help him since he is single and lonely, Lily's anger leads her to poorly advise Ted to settle for Cassie, whom he had spent the previous evening consoling, and take her to the lighthouse and fall in love with her. Ted reluctantly attempts to take her, even after she displays little compatibility with him. Making matters worse, she trips and sprains her ankle and Ted is forced to carry her to the top of the lighthouse, after which he throws up. Ted later realizes that settling would have been a mistake and he was glad he did not. A flash-forward reveals that Ted took the Mother there two years later and proposed, which she enthusiastically accepted.

== Critical reception ==
The A.V. Club's Donna Bowman graded the episode an A.

Bill Kuchman of Popculturology praised the episode's ending, but said, "No matter how beautiful and touching it seemed, it appears that HIMYM has screwed up its timeline." Kuchman cited the Season 7 episode "Trilogy Time" and noted how that episode showed Ted already having a baby daughter in 2015. However, it ultimately transpired that there was no timeline error as shown in the series finale "Last Forever".

Uproxx stated that "The Lighthouse was actually one of the better season 9 episodes" but had a quite short review. Alan Sepinwall, the reviewer stated that he wants "to be writing about “How I Met Your Mother,” but I need it to be “How I Met Your Mother” more consistently for that to happen".

Max Nicholson of IGN gave the episode a 7.8/10 rating saying it "featured a couple of great character stories, although it still needs to pick up the pace."
