= Coming Back (How I Met Your Mother) =

- How I Met Your Mother episode
- Episode no.: Season 9 Episode 2
- Directed by: Pamela Fryman
- Written by: Carter Bays; Craig Thomas
- Original air date: September 23, 2013

Guest appearances
- Wayne Brady as James Stinson; Sherri Shepherd as Daphne; Roger Bart as Curtis

Episode chronology
← Previous "The Locket"	Next → "Last Time in New York"
- How I Met Your Mother season 9

"Coming Back" is the second episode of the ninth season of the CBS sitcom How I Met Your Mother, and the 186th episode overall.

== Plot ==
On Friday at noon, 54 hours before the wedding, Ted and Lily begin checking into the Farhampton Inn. The man at the front desk (Roger Bart) is condescendingly sympathetic towards Ted when he reveals he is at the wedding alone. Lily learns from Marshall that he missed his earlier flight and heads to the bar intending to drown her sorrows, even paying the bartender, named Linus, to constantly place another drink in her hand once it is empty.

Finding out their rooms are not ready yet, Ted and Lily join Barney, Robin and Barney's brother James for drinks as Barney reveals a curse that was placed on the Stinsons in early nineteenth-century Russia, when two brothers ran over an old Gypsy woman, that would cause all Stinson men to constantly be desperate for sex, but believes the curse to be lifted due to James's successful marriage to Tom. However, when Barney leaves to speak to Marshall on the phone, James reveals that he and Tom are getting divorced due to James cheating on him. Horrified, Robin begs James not to drop the bombshell on Barney that weekend, feeling Barney's positive feelings about marriage come from James' relationship. James reluctantly agrees only for a somewhat intoxicated Lily to accidentally blurt it out anyway, prompting Ted to ban her from any more drinks, which fails due to Linus. Barney immediately heads to the front desk and Robin, worried that he is freaking out and thinking about leaving, follows and begs him not to just head to a strip club. Barney reveals that he had actually come to get the keys to James's room which he had prepared specially for him and Tom (including a banner reading "Love is Awesome" and a life-size erotic cake of two naked men). Barney assures Robin that even if James is getting a divorce, he still believes in true love thanks to her and does not plan on going anywhere.

Back in Minnesota, Marshall speaks to Barney on the phone who encourages him to stop acting so nice but instead get more under-handed as it is the only way he will make it back in time. Marshall refuses; however, he and Daphne find out that all flights to New York are cancelled due to a storm meaning the only way he will make it back in time is to rent a car. Daphne throws one of Marshall's bags into a restricted area (something Barney had told Marshall to do) and by the time he retrieves it and makes it to the Rent-a-Car place he finds himself at the back of a long line with Daphne near the front of an adjacent queue. Marshall prays for a miracle, and is amazed when an old man who ends up in charge of his line is actually extremely efficient and Marshall gets ahead of Daphne and snags the last car (even if it is the environmentally unfriendly "Monstrosity"). However, the Rent-a-Car place does not have any child seats for Marvin. Daphne offers to buy Marshall a child seat in exchange for the car keys. Marshall not only gives her the keys but also money to buy a car seat. However, after being left waiting for a while, he begins to doubt Daphne's intentions until she returns with the child seat and the two finally head out for New York.

In the bar, Ted asks James how he is coping. James admits that while he is trying to be happy for Barney, he cannot help but have a different perspective on weddings now that he knows what comes afterwards is not always good. The receptionist arrives to tell James his room is ready, and Ted tells him not to give up and promises he will not either. The audience is then shown a flashforward to exactly a year later, as Ted visits the bar again but this time with the Mother (the first time the two are seen together on screen). The two are clearly very much in love, and Ted tells the Mother that he promised himself he would return there with her as he was sitting in the bar. The Mother tells him that he had not even met her at that point one year ago. Ted confirms this, but assures her he knew she was just around the corner.

In the final scene, Ted is told his room is finally ready only to find it filled with the decorations from James' room much to his dismay.

== Critical reception ==
Donna Bowman of The A.V. Club gave the double-episode premiere of "The Locket" and "Coming Back" a B+ rating. Alan Sepinwall of Uproxx also rated the double-episode saying that there was many "annoying little things, and a few big ones" but one big thing they got absolutely right: That was the Mother.

Max Nicholson of IGN gave the episode an 8.0/10 rating saying it "introduced several great subplots, including a scene between Ted and the Mother."
