= Mom and Dad (How I Met Your Mother) =

- How I Met Your Mother episode
- Episode no.: Season 9 Episode 10
- Directed by: Pamela Fryman
- Written by: Carter Bays; Craig Thomas
- Original air date: November 18, 2013

Guest appearances
- John Lithgow as Jerome Whittaker; Sherri Shepherd as Daphne; Frances Conroy as Loretta Stinson; Wayne Brady as James Stinson; Ben Vereen as Sam Gibbs; Billy Zabka as himself; Marshall Manesh as Ranjit

Episode chronology
← Previous "Platonish"	Next → "Bedtime Stories"
- How I Met Your Mother season 9

"Mom and Dad" is the tenth episode of the ninth season of the CBS sitcom How I Met Your Mother, and the 194th episode overall.

== Plot ==
On Saturday at 3pm, 27 hours before the wedding, Barney and Robin try to find someone to officiate their wedding in the wake of the previous minister's sudden death. James saves the day when he arrives with his father, Sam, who is a minister and has agreed to perform the ceremony. Barney's father, Jerry, arrives with his wife. Barney, after seeing that Jerry and Loretta still get along well after all these years, gets excited at the possibility of the two getting back together. To that end he has Ranjit drive his stepmother away and arranges for Jerry and Loretta to be trapped in an elevator together upon which he provides them with a champagne dinner and drenches them with water in an effort to get them to disrobe. They realize what Barney is doing and refuse to go any further. James quickly rescues the two before revealing to Barney that he wants Loretta to reunite with Sam. Soon the two learn that Loretta and Sam have resumed their relationship since the gang found Sam in Long Island. While Barney is initially upset, Robin convinces him that James needs his parents back together more after all he has lost recently. Barney agrees, and gives Sam and Loretta his blessing.

As best man, Ted is entrusted with an autographed Wayne Gretzky photograph Barney plans to give to Robin as a wedding gift. When Ted's calligraphy ink spills on the photo, he has three main suspects which include Billy Zabka who may have done it to try to reclaim the best man position from Ted. Ted, however, learns that Zabka was getting a massage at the time. When the other two suspects are discounted, Lily convinces Ted that he is being paranoid and that his own carelessness caused the accident. When cleaning the ink off the photograph, however, Lily finds it is a photograph of Zabka, while Ted discovers that it was Jerome getting the massage in Zabka's name. Lily tackles Billy and they confront him; he confesses that the "bad guy" roles he played in the 1980s led to widespread revilement, and being temporarily promoted as best man was a rare affirmation of his character, and he intended to be the 'good guy' by finding a replacement for the photo. He realizes, however, that he allowed himself to truly become a bad guy and he apologizes. Ted decides to tell Barney Billy's version of events, though Barney does not reassign the best man duties.

Daphne and Marshall seem to finally get along well together, but Daphne's mood sours after her daughter, hearing that Daphne might miss her Model UN speech, tells her not to come; this reveals that the story Daphne told Marshall in Minneapolis was not really a lie as she had claimed. Daphne explains that her daughter, who lives with Daphne's ex-husband, does not understand that Daphne spends time away to support the family. Marshall insists on bringing Daphne to the speech recital, which they reach in time, correctly believing that Daphne's daughter will forgive her as long as she shows up. Marshall says farewell to Daphne and excuses himself and Marvin to continue their journey to Farhampton.

In the end, Jerry successfully finds Ranjit's limousine and demands his wife back.

== Production ==
"Mom and Dad" features series regulars Josh Radnor as Ted Mosby, Jason Segel as Marshall Eriksen, Neil Patrick Harris as Barney Stinson, Alyson Hannigan as Lily Aldrin, and Cobie Smulders as Robin Scherbatsky. The episode guest stars John Lithgow. Executive producer Craig Thomas previously stated that they had plans to bring back Lithgow following his introduction in "Legendaddy".

== Critical reception ==
The A.V. Club's Donna Bowman graded the episode a B+.

Max Nicholson of IGN gave the episode 5.0/10, saying that it squandered another half-hour of the wedding weekend with three subpar storylines.

Angel Cohn at Television Without Pity gave the episode a D.
