= How Your Mother Met Me =

- How I Met Your Mother episode
- Episode no.: Season 9 Episode 16
- Directed by: Pamela Fryman
- Written by: Carter Bays; Craig Thomas
- Original air date: January 27, 2014

Guest appearances
- Andrew Rannells as Darren; Ahna O'Reilly as Kelly; Adam Paul as Mitch; the naked man; Roger Bart as Curtis; Lou Ferrigno, Jr. as Louis; Rachel Bilson as Cindy; Robert Belushi as Linus

Episode chronology
← Previous "Unpause"	Next → "Sunrise"
- How I Met Your Mother season 9

"How Your Mother Met Me" is the sixteenth episode of the ninth season of the CBS sitcom How I Met Your Mother and the 200th episode overall. This is the only episode of the series in which the episode title was used instead of the usual opening that featured the cast and series' title; the usual photos of Ted and his four friends enjoying themselves are replaced with analogous snapshots of the Mother and her friends.

The plot is mainly focused on Cristin Milioti's role as the Mother, and how some of her life events coincide with those of Ted's and the rest of the gang.

The episode has been very well received by viewers and critics, becoming the highest-rated episode of the series according to the online review aggregator IMDb.

== Plot ==
At MacLaren's Pub in September 2005, a woman passes by Barney and Ted as they get ready for another round of "Have you met Ted?" It turns out that the woman, Kelly, went to the wrong MacLaren's Pub and takes a cab to another MacLaren's on the East Side to join the Mother (her roommate) on her 21st birthday. She awaits the arrival of her boyfriend Max only to receive a call informing her of his death. After the funeral service, she returns to the apartment to open Max's last gift to her: a ukulele.

At St Patrick's Day three years later, Kelly encourages the Mother to go out and date again, bringing her to the same bar where Ted and Barney are celebrating. The two women run into Mitch, her old orchestra instructor who was then a music teacher at a Bronx public school. Inspired by his work, the Mother offers Mitch her cello and they head back to her apartment to get it. However, the Mother prepares the cello only to see Mitch pull off The Naked Man. She is disgusted at his move, but momentarily forgets he is naked while he shares some valuable wisdom with her. "What is it you want to do with your life." "I want to end poverty," she replies. "Then every decision you make from here on out should be in the service of that." He leaves and she remembers her yellow umbrella at the bar and goes out to get it, leaving behind Kelly (who earlier rebuffed Barney at the bar) to have sex with Mitch. She learns that a "super inconsiderate person" (Ted) took the umbrella. The Mother acts on the wisdom from the naked orchestra teacher revealing her desire to end poverty by taking up economics in college.

In the fall of 2009, the Mother sits her first session in Econ 305 and meets Cindy, whom she offers to move in with as her roommate. They see Ted enter the room (after which The Mother laughs at his "shellfish" joke), but the Mother thinks she's in the wrong room when he announces the subject and runs off. She heads back to the room after seeing Ted scramble to his actual classroom.

A few months later in 2010, she gets her umbrella back. Cindy tells her that she broke up with the "architecture professor" because the man picked out the Mother's items and saw that they were more compatible; in the ensuing conversation, Cindy spontaneously kisses The Mother, which makes her realise her homosexuality. In turn, The Mother decides to start dating again, having not been kissed in a long time.

Some time later, a man named Darren approaches the Mother and is welcomed into her band — however, Darren gradually takes it over and makes the Mother carry band equipment.

In April 2012, The Mother meets Louis and he helps her with the equipment, but later at MacLaren's Pub (which Louis thought was named "Puzzles"), she tells him she's not yet ready to date because of her loss. Louis asks her to give him a call if she changes her mind and she leaves just before Ted appears to Lily and Barney in a green dress. They begin dating not long after, but they are not really a perfect match (for example, Louis is not amused when The Mother has her English muffin sing show tunes). The Mother's band is eventually booked for Barney and Robin's wedding in 2013; she stays at Louis's summer cottage not far from the Farhampton Inn.

In a flash-forward to the eve of the wedding, the Mother discovers Darren's ad for a replacement bass player and heads down to the Inn to confront him, eventually picking up Marshall and Marvin along the way. After seeing Darren get his comeuppance, she returns to Louis's house, where he proposes to her, but she goes outside to think about it. She begins talking to Max and asks his permission to move on with her life. Interpreting a gust of wind as Max's answer, the Mother bids him one last goodbye and declines Louis's proposal, later checking in at Farhampton Inn. On her room's balcony, she plays the ukulele and sings "La Vie en Rose". Ted hears her next door (with Future Ted saying that it was the first and most favorite time he heard his future wife sing this song) and gets back inside to tell Barney about it, only to find out he has disappeared.

== Production ==
In interviews before it aired, Carter Bays stated that the episode is "a fun little Disneyland tour through the series from the perspective of someone outside the group". He also added that they used some "fun trickery" to incorporate scenes from the pilot and other past episodes. Unlike the 100th episode, which Bays said was more of a celebration of the cast, he stated that the 200th episode was "a different kind of story ... but it felt like the right one to do in terms of the greater story of the show."

There were a few mistakes in the episode; for instance, the St. Patrick's Day scene was said to take place in April. Carter Bays stated that these will be fixed for future airings of the episode.

== Critical reception ==
"How Your Mother Met Me" received critical acclaim, and is regarded as one of the strongest episodes of the series. As of June 2026, "How Your Mother Met Me" is rated 1 out of 208 episodes of How I Met Your Mother on IMDb.

Donna Bowman of The A.V. Club graded the episode an A−, saying it was "exactly what we need as we enter this final stretch of the series."

Max Nicholson of IGN gave the episode 8.5/10, calling it "both entertaining and heartwarming."

Alan Sepinwall of HitFix praised the episode as "lovely" saying, "overall it did about as good a job as possible as a single episode could at both telling a story of the Mother’s last seven years, while weaving her into the larger continuity of the series."

Jessica Goodman from HuffPost called it "one of the strongest, most beautiful episodes of 'How I Met Your Mother,'" "the best episode in years," and "20-something minutes of pure delight for... fans."

Sandra Gonzalez of Entertainment Weekly called it "a milestone of an episode."
