= The Broken Code =

- How I Met Your Mother episode
- Episode no.: Season 9 Episode 4
- Directed by: Pamela Fryman
- Written by: Matt Kuhn
- Original air date: October 7, 2013

Guest appearances
- Billy Zabka as himself; Tim Gunn as himself; Melissa Tang as Amanda; Marshall Manesh as Ranjit; Ellen D. Williams as Patrice

Episode chronology
← Previous "Last Time in New York"	Next → "The Poker Game"
- How I Met Your Mother season 9

"The Broken Code" is the fourth episode of the ninth season of the CBS sitcom How I Met Your Mother, and the 188th episode overall.

== Plot ==
51 hours before the wedding, Barney confronts Ted over his meeting with Robin and holding her hand. Ted explains he was comforting Robin as a friend.

Lily has improved her Marshpillow to incorporate a video screen with Marshall communicating through video chat while he is en route to Farhampton. Robin wishes Lily had put more time in planning her bachelorette party where only Patrice showed up. Lily was too busy planning the move to Rome, but later reveals that Robin does not have any girlfriends. Robin admits she has trouble connecting with other women, and Lily decides Robin needs to have at least one other female friend while she is away in Rome. Lily has Robin try to befriend women at the hotel bar, and eventually hits it off with someone who shares her love for ice hockey. Lily is jealous and drives her away, and the two decide they'll be fine as long as they have each other.

Ted plans a poker game for Barney and handwriting the table cards for the reception in calligraphy, Barney informs Ted he accidentally forgot the cards, which Ted agrees to remake. Barney asks Ted to move from his current room to the basement to make room for a relative, and to house the cages for doves to be used at the wedding. When delivering the cards to Barney, Ted realizes Barney is mad at him for holding hands with Robin. Barney has chosen Billy Zabka to be the best man, who has already started the poker game. Barney claims Ted's actions go against the Bro Code, which Ted disagrees. Unable to decide who is correct, the two ask Marshall via video chat to weigh in. Marshall asks the two to recreate the events, with Ted asked to hold Barney's hand and offer comfort, and see if it feels weird or not. Ted admits he still sometimes has feelings for Robin, but promises Barney he won't do anything to get between them and that he will try to let those feelings go. Barney forgives Ted and during a poker game, Barney reinstates him as the best man.

== Critical reception ==
Donna Bowman of The A.V. Club gave the episode a B− rating. She stated that the episode leaves "nothing fancy or inspired" and gave the writers some challenges in flexibility with the character pairings. Entertainment Weekly's Sandra Gonzalez said Ted and Barney's scenes may be closure for Ted, as far as his feelings for Robin are concerned. Bill Kuchman of Popculturology gave the episode poor marks, saying that the idea of Barney using the Bro Code against Ted shows that "HIMYM has forgotten a key moment in its history," ignoring the events of 'The Goat'. Max Nicholson of IGN gave the episode a 7.0/10 rating saying it "made some interesting headway with Ted and Barney, but quickly wore thin with Lily and Robin." Alan Sepinwall of HitFix said the episode showed the original cast in their usual ways, noting Milioti's absence.
