= Platonish =

- How I Met Your Mother episode
- Episode no.: Season 9 Episode 9
- Directed by: Pamela Fryman
- Written by: George Sloan
- Original air date: November 11, 2013

Guest appearance
- Bryan Cranston as Hammond Druthers

Episode chronology
← Previous "The Lighthouse"	Next → "Mom and Dad"
- How I Met Your Mother season 9

"Platonish" is the ninth episode of the ninth season of the CBS sitcom How I Met Your Mother, and the 193rd episode overall. The episode originally aired on November 11, 2013. It was directed by Pamela Fryman and written by George Sloan.

The episode features a guest appearance by Bryan Cranston as Hammond Druthers and includes Cristin Milioti as the Mother. Its storylines involve Ted reconsidering his feelings for Robin and Barney recalling the events that led him to create "The Robin".

== Plot ==
At 11am on Saturday, with 31 hours left before the wedding, Barney, Ted, and Lily comfort Robin over the news that her own mother is not attending her wedding. Barney takes this as a challenge to cheer her up, claiming he never fails a challenge, but Lily counters that Barney never finished a challenge to pick up diapers and samosas in the fall of 2012. Barney recounts the story.

One night at the bar, Barney discussed with the gang the fact that the group's only true male/female platonic relationship was between Marshall and Robin. By this point, Lily had been fed up with Barney's own creative plays to pick up women. She dares him to take up challenges that she and Robin will choose – which include getting a woman's number while speaking like a dolphin and not using any word that has the letter E. Seeing that Barney has passed all their challenges, Lily and Robin decide to make him do an errand for them by inserting the challenge of picking up a woman while performing the request – to buy her a pack of diapers for Marvin and samosas for Robin. Barney buys the items and then attempts a play on a woman at a pharmacy; the woman is actually Ted's future wife, who sees through his facade and assumes that Barney is doing this to take his mind off being sad about something. When Barney questions her, she senses that Barney was once in love but messed it up, and keeping himself busy enough to come to terms with that. (with Future Ted telling his kids this was "How Barney met your Mother"). Outside, the two talk about Barney's failed relationship with Robin and how he had felt lost since they broke up. When Barney says he can easily woo back Robin, the woman declares that if he really wants her so much, he will have to give it his very best shot. The woman leaves him and Barney returns home, leaving behind the diapers and samosas, to draft "The Robin".

Elsewhere, Marshall and Ted watch a game between the Washington Generals and the Harlem Globetrotters. As they watch the game (with both supporting the Generals), the two begin talking about Ted's feelings for Robin and whether he will not pursue her again. Ted assures Marshall he isn't interested, as he knows Robin isn't interested in any real commitment so their relationship is just 'platonic'. Marshall tells him that it has been years now and people change. Ted also gets a call from his old boss Hammond Druthers who offers Ted a job in Chicago in light of his success with the GNB headquarters. Ted initially refuses, but eventually agrees to think about it under pressure from Druthers. Returning home after the game, Ted finds Robin eating olives which surprises him as she hated olives during their first date, and Robin tells him that she changed her view on them. Reminded of Marshall's words, Ted calls Druthers and turns down the job believing he still has a chance with Robin. Druthers tells Ted that the offer remains open if he changes his mind, and later at MacLaren's, Ted admits he and Robin now only share a "platonish" relationship. However, rather than immediately pursue her, he wants to leave it up to fate to bring them together.

Flashforwarding back to the Farhampton Inn, Barney says that despite all of the challenges, he still hasn't finished one more challenge – to cheer up Robin. Now inspired by what Barney has done, Robin kisses him as Ted watches them sadly, feeling that his decision to leave his relationship with her up to fate may have cost him a future with her.

== Production ==
Show co-creator Carter Bays tweeted before the episode broadcast that the flashback takes place between "Splitsville" and "The Stamp Tramp".

== Critical reception ==
The A.V. Club's Donna Bowman graded the episode an A.

Laura Hertzfeld of Entertainment Weekly noted the episode's homages to When Harry Met Sally....

Bill Kuchman of Popculturology praised Milioti, saying she "continued to show us why she was the perfect pick for this role, giving life to a character that really has never been more than an abstract concept. We’ve only seen her a few times, but Milioti instantly makes The Mother someone you root for."

Max Nicholson of IGN gave the episode 7.8/10, saying that it had "solid storylines" for Barney and Ted, with Cranston and Milioti's appearances as the "high points."

Alan Sepinwall, a noted critic of the show, said the episode's emphasis on flashbacks was a welcome change from the Farhampton Inn.

TV.com's Kaitlin Thomas praised the episode for the revelation that the Mother set Barney off on the road that will lead him to marrying Robin.
