= Once (cast album) =

Once: A New Musical (Original Broadway Cast Recording)

Cast recording by the original Broadway cast of Once
- Released: 13 March 2012
- Recorded: 17 January 2012
- Studio: Avatar (New York, New York)
- Genre: Musical theatre; show tune
- Length: 46:58
- Label: Masterworks Broadway
- Producer: Steven Epstein; Martin Lowe

Once: A New Musical (Original Broadway Cast Recording) is the cast album to the 2012 Broadway musical Once based on the 2007 film of the same name directed by John Carney. Like the film, Glen Hansard and Markéta Irglová composed the music and penned the lyrics for the songs which were performed by Steve Kazee, Cristin Milioti, and other principal cast ensemble from the musical. The album was released by Masterworks Broadway on 13 March 2012, and won the Grammy Award for Best Musical Theater Album.

== Recording and production ==
The cast recorded the album at the Avatar Studios in New York City on 17 January 2012.

== Reception ==
Jon O'Brien of AllMusic wrote "Different enough from the movie soundtrack, but still wholly respectful, Once is a rare Broadway effort that can be enjoyed by both fans and detractors of musical theater." "The principals are as attractive as you could wish, but it would be even better if Milioti's lovely, flexible voice were featured on more than four songs." The New York Times wrote "To hear the score's plaintive Irish folk-pop played live by an ensemble that includes a shifting mix of guitar, violin, cello, mandolin, ukulele, accordion, piano and cajon drum is to be caressed by a warm acoustic sound that approaches the dynamic refinement of classical chamber music [...] Interspersed with upbeat jigs and traditional tunes, Once manages the feat of being emotional but never mawkish."

== Track listing ==
Once: A New Musical (Original Broadway Cast Recording) track listing
| No. | Title | Lyrics | Music | Performer(s) | Length |
|---|---|---|---|---|---|
| 1. | "The North Strand" | | Glen Hansard; Markéta Irglová | Instrumental | 1:11 |
| 2. | "Leave" | Hansard | Hansard; Irglová | Steve Kazee | 3:06 |
| 3. | "Falling Slowly" | Hansard; Irglová | Hansard; Irglová | Kazee; Cristin Milioti | 4:26 |
| 4. | "The Moon" | Hansard | Hansard; Irglová | Will Connolly; Ensemble | 2:49 |
| 5. | "Ej Pada Pada Rosicka" | Traditional | Hansard; Irglová | Ensemble | 2:09 |
| 6. | "If You Want Me" | Irglová | Hansard; Irglová | Kazee; Milioti; Ensemble | 3:46 |
| 7. | "Broken Hearted Hoover Fixer Sucker Guy" | Hansard | Hansard; Irglová | Kazee | 1:03 |
| 8. | "Say It to Me Now" | Hansard | Hansard; Irglová | Kazee | 2:30 |
| 9. | "Abandoned in Bandon" | Martin Lowe; Andy Taylor; Enda Walsh | Lowe; Taylor; Walsh | Taylor | 1:11 |
| 10. | "Gold" | Fergus O'Farrell | O'Farrell | Kazee; Ensemble | 4:00 |
| 11. | "Sleeping" | Hansard | Hansard; Irglová | Kazee | 4:18 |
| 12. | "When Your Mind's Made Up" | Hansard | Hansard; Irglová | Kazee; Milioti; Ensemble | 3:30 |
| 13. | "The Hill" | Irglová | Hansard; Irglová | Milioti | 4:28 |
| 14. | "It Cannot Be About That" | | Hansard; Irglová | Traditional | 0:57 |
| 15. | "Gold" (A Cappella) | O'Farrell | O'Farrell | Company | 2:28 |
| 16. | "Falling Slowly" (Reprise) | Hansard; Irglová | Hansard; Irglová | Kazee; Milioti; Ensemble | 5:01 |
| Total length: | | | | | 46:58 |

== Credits and personnel ==
Credits adapted from liner notes.

Album credits

- Martin Lowe – album producer
- Stephen Epstein – album producer
- Richard King – recording, mixing
- Rob Preuss – music supervisor
- Martin Lowe – conductor, orchestrator and arranger
- Fernando Lodeiro – assistant engineer
- Michael Bauer – assistant engineer
- Brett Mayer – editing, assistant mixing
- Federico Ruiz – design
- Roxanne Slimak – design direction
- Frank W. Ockenfels – photography
- Joan Marcus – photography

Performer credits

- Steve Kazee – vocals, guitar
- Cristin Milioti – vocals, piano
- J. Michael Zygo – vocals, guitar
- David Abeles – vocals, guitar, harmonica, piano
- Will Connolly – vocals, ukulele, bass
- Elizabeth A. Davis – vocals, violin
- David Patrick Kelly – vocals, mandolin
- Anne L. Nathan – vocals, accordion
- Lucas Papaelias – vocals, mandolin, banjo, drums
- Andy Taylor – vocals, cello
- Erikka Walsh – vocals, violin
- Paul Whitty – vocals, guitar, percussion, cajon, cymbal

== Chart performance ==
=== Weekly charts ===
Weekly chart performance for Once: A New Musical (Original Broadway Cast Recording)
| Chart (2012) | Peak position |
|---|---|
| US Cast Albums (Billboard) | 1 |

=== Year-end charts ===
Year-end chart performance for Once: A New Musical (Original Broadway Cast Recording)
| Chart (2012) | Position |
|---|---|
| US Cast Albums (Billboard) | 4 |
| Chart (2013) | Position |
| US Cast Albums (Billboard) | 3 |
| Chart (2014) | Position |
| US Cast Albums (Billboard) | 4 |
| Chart (2010) | Position |
| US Cast Albums (Billboard) | 15 |

== Accolades ==
Awards for Once: A New Musical (Original Broadway Cast Recording)
| Year | Award | Category | Recipient(s) | Result | Ref. |
|---|---|---|---|---|---|
| 2013 | Grammy Awards | Best Musical Theater Album | Steve Kazee and Cristin Milioti, principal soloists Steven Epstein and Martin Lowe, producers Glen Hansard and Marketa Irglova, composers/lyricists | Won | |
