= Rally (How I Met Your Mother) =

- How I Met Your Mother episode
- Episode no.: Season 9 Episode 18
- Directed by: Pamela Fryman
- Written by: Carter Bays; Craig Thomas
- Original air date: February 24, 2014

Guest appearances
- Ray Wise as Robin Scherbatsky Sr.; Robert Belushi as Linus; Spencer Ralston as Marvin Eriksen at 18; Katie Silverman as Penny Mosby; Dexter Cross as Luke Mosby

Episode chronology
← Previous "Sunrise"	Next → "Vesuvius"
- How I Met Your Mother season 9

"Rally" is the eighteenth episode of the ninth season of the CBS sitcom How I Met Your Mother, and the 202nd episode overall.

On their wedding day, Barney has a massive hangover. The gang tries to help him get over the hangover by finding the correct ingredients.

== Plot ==
On New Years Eve 2021, Ted and The Mother are in the back of a limo on their way to a New Year's Eve party. Ted pops open some champagne to toast to a great year with his wife, who has just released a new book. The Mother warns Ted to go easy on the champagne, but he tells her he will be fine as he made a vow in the past. Future Ted then recounts the story behind the vow to his children.

At 8 a.m. on Sunday, ten hours before the wedding in 2013, Ted and Robin finally find Barney passed out in front of his room and are unable to wake him. With the wedding pictures set to begin in two hours, the gang decides they must do whatever they can to revive him. Marshall, disgusted at Barney's drunkenness, makes a vow to never get that drunk again. Future Ted reveals that Marshall would break that vow when he was running for the New York Supreme Court in 2020 and thought he was about to lose to his old friend Brad (also a judge), only to make a comeback victory.

Ted reminds the others of Barney's hangover cure, "Stinson's Hangover Fixer Elixir", and they remember that it has cured all of their own worst hangovers. The only problem is that the drink has a secret ingredient that only Barney knows. Ted and Marshall decide to recover all the known ingredients, while Robin and Lily attempt to revive Barney long enough to learn the secret ingredient. Robin and Lily first try to take him outside for fresh air, but this results in accidentally throwing him down the stairs. After several other methods prove unsuccessful, Lily joins in Marshall's vow. Future Ted says that she would also break it on Marvin's first day of college in 2030 when she and Marshall drink to celebrate Marvin leaving home, only to see Marvin later walk into the same bar.

Marshall and Ted, having gathered most of the ingredients, attempt to gather the last one: grease. The chef at the inn states they have no grease, only for Ted to point out that bacon produces grease. The chef says they throw the grease out and will only make more bacon if it all gets eaten before breakfast is over. Ted tries to get Marshall to eat it all, but Marshall refuses and tells Ted to do it. Ted, having never eaten bacon due to his mother's lie that he is allergic, is reluctant to try. After his first bite, however, he begins to hungrily devour it and even wards off Marshall's attempts to eat any. They get the grease from the next batch, which Ted also attempts to eat. Future Ted states that this was the first and last time he ate bacon.

Meanwhile, the girls are still unable to revive Barney and Lily suggests making out with Robin, more out of personal interest than a desire to wake Barney. Robin also joins in Marshall's vow, revealed to be broken a few years later in 2016 while she and Barney are on vacation in Buenos Aires and they wake up in the wrong hotel room with someone else's baby. Their kiss is successful and Barney awakens long enough to tell the gang that the secret ingredient is actually a lie that he made up to make his friends feel better after the worst episodes of their lives. Barney says that he lied to his friends because he loves them and so the gang, realizing that he made a genuine and heartfelt effort to be there for them during some of their weakest moments, decides to lie to him, telling him that they used his "Weekend at Barney's" play to get through the wedding pictures and Robin's father was impressed with Barney's quieter side and requested a high-five. In reality, Robin canceled the photos and her father kicked Barney in the crotch out of anger. Finally, Ted joins in on the vow and it is revealed that he did not break it. Instead, on New Year's Day 2022, Ted gives the elixir to The Mother after she got too drunk the night before. She drinks it and greets her children as they run in the room.

The episode ends with Robin talking about how she and Lily actually made out and suggesting that they do it again in front of Ted and Marshall, even though it is clear she wants to do it again for her own pleasure. Lily, however, says she felt it was weird and has no desire to do it again.

== Critical reception ==
Bill Kuchman of Popculturology praised the episode for continuing Barney's evolution, saying, "It's amazing how much effort HIMYM has put into that transition over the past few seasons, but they've really succeeded in transforming a one-dimensional (yet very funny) womanizer into a fleshed-out person."

Donna Bowman of The A.V. Club graded the episode an A.

Max Nicholson of IGN gave the episode 7.5/10, saying it did little to move the story forward, but it did include a few telling flash-forward sequences.
