= Vesuvius (How I Met Your Mother) =

- How I Met Your Mother episode
- Episode no.: Season 9 Episode 19
- Directed by: Pamela Fryman
- Written by: Barbara Adler
- Original air date: March 3, 2014

Guest appearances
- Tracey Ullman as Genevieve, Robin's mother; Chris Kattan as Jed Mosely; Roger Bart as Curtis; Lucy Hale as Katie Scherbatsky; Jon Heder as Narshall

Episode chronology
← Previous "Rally"	Next → "Daisy"
- How I Met Your Mother season 9

"Vesuvius" is the nineteenth episode of the ninth season of the CBS sitcom How I Met Your Mother, and the 203rd episode overall. The episode features Ted in 2024, telling the Mother about the day of Robin and Barney's wedding. The final scene prompted some to think that the Mother was dead; this was proven correct in the series finale, "Last Forever".

== Plot ==
Ted and the Mother are dining at the Farhampton Inn during a snowstorm in 2024. They pass the time by telling each other stories, but come to realize that they have told each other every story they know, finally considering themselves "an old married couple". Curtis walks by and reminds Ted of a story about a lamp broken on the day of the wedding. Believing it to be a story he has never told the Mother, Ted excitedly recounts the events.

Near the end of the morning on the day of the wedding, Robin and her sister Katie are playing ice hockey and Robin hits a lamp with the puck, shattering it to pieces. Lily intervenes and tries to show Robin a special scrapbook of her and Barney's love life. Robin's lack of interest in the scrapbook leads Lily to believe that Robin has not fully accepted the fact that she is getting married, even taking time to watch The Wedding Bride Too on her TV. Lily shares her thoughts with Marshall, who heads to the room to watch the movie with Robin. While they are enjoying the movie, Lily puts on the wedding dress she planned to wear for pictures to try and scare Robin, but Robin still does not show any reaction. At this point, the Mother realizes she has heard the story, but continues to listen.

Meanwhile, Ted catches Barney secretly entering a room, and finds out that the room belongs to "Susan Tupp", leading him to believe that he is cheating on Robin. Ted breaks in to try and catch them in the act, but discovers that Barney actually rented the room as storage for all his suits (Sue Tupp a.k.a. "Suit Up!"). Barney is freaking out over which suit to wear and does not agree with Ted's choices. Finally, Ted tells him to try on a special wedding-day suit Tim Gunn made for him, but Barney dislikes it, claiming it looks and feels terrible. Ted explains to him that this is simply because the suit is new, but once the ceremonies begin, he will feel it is a perfect fit. This relaxes Barney, and he signs off on it. They rejoin the rest of the gang in Robin's room, where they realize this will be their last day together, as Ted is moving to Chicago the next day. They are sad at first, but get over it somewhat. The men go get some food while Robin goes out for some ice – and chances upon her mother, whom she happily embraces and finally realizes she is about to get married.

Reflecting on the events of the day 11 years later, Ted admits to the Mother that some moments like that one in Robin's room, with the gang all together possibly for the last time, were so intense that things were better left unsaid and to just enjoy the moments while you (still) have them. The Mother expresses worry at Ted living in his past stories, but instead asks him to live life moving forward. Noting the sudden appearance of Robin's mom, she asks, "What mother is going to miss her daughter's wedding?" At this, Ted falls silent, and his eyes visibly fill with tears. She quickly changes the subject to how Barney got the Scuba Suit for one of his earlier scams; Ted having forgotten that he had stolen it when he first told the story.

== Production ==
In December 2013, Cobie Smulders stated that the show was looking to cast Robin's mother, and said that Annette Bening was one of the actresses she pitched to producers.

== Critical reception ==
Bill Kuchman of Popculturology noted that the episode supports the theory that Ted is telling his children this story because The Mother is dead in the year 2030, drawing parallels between "Vesuvius" and "The Time Travelers". "When 'The Time Travelers' aired, there was a lot of discussion over what that soliloquy meant. Was The Mother dead? Was Ted dead? After seeing 'Vesuvius,' one of the theories certainly has a lot more weight now," Kuchman wrote. "Sure, maybe Ted’s speech in 'The Time Travelers' and the ending of 'Vesuvius' have nothing to do with each other, but is that really the most likely case? ... I originally nixed both 'The Mother is dead' and 'Ted is dead' theories, citing Occam's razor. The simplest explanation is often the correct explanation, and back then that was the case. If I’m sticking to Occam’s Razor still, it's now a lot harder to debunk 'The Mother is dead' theory."

Donna Bowman of The A.V. Club graded the episode a B.

Max Nicholson of IGN gave the episode 8.3/10, saying it finished strong thanks to a compelling and emotional frame story featuring Ted and the Mother.
