= Last Time in New York =

- How I Met Your Mother episode
- Episode no.: Season 9 Episode 3
- Directed by: Pamela Fryman
- Written by: Craig Gerard & Matthew Zinman
- Original air date: September 30, 2013

Episode chronology
← Previous "Coming Back"	Next → "The Broken Code"
- How I Met Your Mother season 9

"Last Time in New York" is the third episode of the ninth season of the CBS sitcom How I Met Your Mother, and the 187th episode overall. It was directed by Pamela Fryman and written by Craig Gerard and Matthew Zinman. The episode originally aired on September 30, 2013. The episode follows Ted Mosby and Lily Aldrin as Ted confronts his impending departure from New York, while Barney Stinson and Robin Scherbatsky seek time alone before their wedding. The episode received mixed-to-positive reviews from critics.

== Plot ==
On Friday at 2:00 PM, 52 hours before the wedding, Lily discovers Ted's list of things he wants to do in New York before he moves to Chicago. She becomes frustrated that she is the only person who knows about his plans. As she goes through the items on the list, Lily makes Ted realize that his list is just proof of how much he loves New York. She notes that the only item on Ted's list that he has not accomplished is having one last scotch with Barney and forces Ted to admit that he has been avoiding Barney and Robin since the day he tried to help Robin find her locket at the carousel. Lily convinces Ted to say goodbye to all the bad things since the good things will always be waiting for him. At some point during their conversation, Lily and Robin reveal that they broke a 30-year-old Glen McKenna Ted reserved for his drink with Barney during a sword fight and tried faking whatever is left. When Lily discovers that an earlier sword fight between Ted and Marshall destroyed a special dress she was planning to wear at the rehearsal dinner, she punishes them, especially Marshall as his road trip with Daphne brings them to Wisconsin.

Meanwhile, Robin and Barney realize they have very little time together before their elderly relatives arrive for their wedding. Worried that the drive and passion in their relationship will fade away after they are married, they look for a place to have sex one last time. When they see Robin's great-grandparents are still ready to jump on each other even after 60 years of marriage, they stop worrying that their relationship will become dull and argumentative and decide to face their relatives.

Ted finally decides to stop avoiding Barney and goes with a bottle and two glasses to meet Barney. Before Ted can offer the scotch, Barney reveals that he had seen Ted and Robin at the carousel where she had been looking for her missing locket.

== Critical reception ==
Donna Bowman of The A.V. Club gave the episode an A− rating, praising the episodes pacing, dialogue and editing. She notes that while they make familiar sitcom jokes around the wedding them HIMYM is able to make them fresh and new. She also highlights the performances of Neil Patrick Harris and Colbie Smulders, as well as the quieter scenes with Ted and Lily about his planned move to Chicago, which she felt added real emotional depth to the episode.

Max Nicholson of IGN gave the episode a 7 out of 10 rating claiming it "included a funny and sweet subplot for Ted and Lily, and not much else." He felt the other storylines were less engaging and that the episode relied to heavily on the Ted and Lily scenes.

Popculturology's Bill Kuchman felt that the episodes storylines were somewhat disjointed, however he particularly enjoyed the closing scene involving Lily. "Between last week's episodes and "Last Time in New York," Season 9 of HIMYM has felt less than a tight storyline and more like a series of vignettes punctuated by heartstring-tugging closing scenes. ... This week's episode wrapped up with one of my favorite Lily moments in a long time."

In a review from Hollywood.com, the episode is praised for its emotional focus on the friendship between Ted and Lily, particularly their final conversation about Ted's decision to move away from New York. The reviewer felt the scene recalled the emotional strength of the show's earlier seasons and showed that the series had retained its ability to balance comedy and heartfelt moments.
