= Sunrise (How I Met Your Mother) =

- How I Met Your Mother episode
- Episode no.: Season 9 Episode 17
- Directed by: Pamela Fryman
- Written by: Carter Bays; Craig Thomas
- Original air date: February 3, 2014

Guest appearances
- Sarah Chalke as Stella Zinman; Ashley Williams as Victoria; Abby Elliott as Jeanette; Bill Fagerbakke as Marvin Eriksen, Sr.; BriTANicK as Kyle and Justin; Roger Bart as Curtis; Tim Gunn as himself

Episode chronology
← Previous "How Your Mother Met Me"	Next → "Rally"
- How I Met Your Mother season 9

"Sunrise" is the seventeenth episode of the ninth season of the CBS sitcom How I Met Your Mother, and the 201st episode overall.

== Plot ==
Future Ted tells a story about how he watched his balloon "friend" fly away, stating the event caused him to believe that if you let go of the things you love, you will lose them forever. In the present, on Sunday at 5 AM, 13 hours before the wedding, Ted and Robin are walking along the beach, reminiscing about Ted's top five exes: 5. Stella, 4. Zoey, 3. Slutty Pumpkin, 2. Marshall from the time he and Ted pretended to be a couple to try to sell Barney's apartment, 1. Victoria; and his five worst exes: 5. Blah Blah (Carol), 4. "Boats, Boats, Boats" (Becky), 3. Karen, 2. Zoey (who made both lists), and 1. Jeanette.

Meanwhile, a drunk Barney walks out of the hotel to find two men on the street and takes them to a strip club saying he will teach them how to live. The two men are dismissive of Barney's claims that the way they dress will be key to picking up women when Barney takes them to Tim Gunn to be fitted for suits, but change their minds when they go to a party where Barney plays the "Have you met-" game, setting the boys up with two women. At sunrise, Barney tells the boys what he kept telling Ted earlier in the series, that every moment will be legendary if it's shared with friends. Barney hands the two men a stack of napkins; the top napkin says "The Playbook". Barney leaves after passing on everything he knew about the bachelor life to them without revealing his name.

At the hotel, Marshall imagines a ghost Lily in the hotel room with him. After he brings up San Francisco, the ghost Lily says he should have this argument with 2006 Lily. When he tells the 2006 Lily that her leaving him was the saddest he's ever felt, she reminds him of his father's death, which brings a shade of his father into the room. Marshall argues with his ghosts until the present imaginary Lily tells him that as long as he thinks of their arguments in terms of winning and losing, he is gradually going to lose her. When the real Lily returns, she and Marshall reconcile after she tells him that they should stay in New York.

When Robin asks if Ted has kept in touch with his ex-girlfriends, he says that he has not, though Future Ted reveals that he had lied. In truth, Ted had contacted Stella, Victoria, and Jeanette to locate Robin's missing locket. After calling Stella and failing to find the locket in Los Angeles, he learned that Victoria had taken the locket with her to Germany. Victoria agreed to send the locket to Ted, but the package had been intercepted by Jeanette. In the present, Ted confesses to Robin that he and Victoria broke up because he was unwilling to end his friendship with Robin. A stunned Robin tells him that she would have been unhappy, but understanding and that she demands to know why Ted would give up Victoria for their friendship; he admits it is because, for him, there is no top 5 – only a top 1, which is Robin. It is revealed that Ted's attempt to recover Robin's locket had concluded when Jeanette dropped the locket into the river after, ironically, pointing out how irrational he is for being unwilling to let go of Robin. Ted and Robin end their evening watching the sunrise together and Ted finally lets go of Robin, who is shown flying away in his mind, but is still disappointed to learn that Robin thought he should have kissed her at the end of their first date. While the scene plays out, Eternal flame by The Bangles plays in the background.

== Critical reception ==
Bill Kuchman of Popculturology gave the episode high marks, noting that it didn't just rehash previous episodes focusing on Ted and Robin's relationship. "There was never a 'will they or won’t they?' moment in this episode, a change from past Ted/Robin episodes like in last season's Something Old," Kuchman said.

Jessica Goodman from the HuffPost gave a positive review, although she criticized a few scenes from the episode: "This week, "Sunrise" catapulted us back to present day in Season 9, the morning of Robin and Barney's wedding. The shenanigans we've come to expect from the final season were back – some in an "ugh" kind of way (ahem ghosts) – but Ted's confession left me in a sweet spot."

Donna Bowman of The A.V. Club graded the episode an A. "I always knew that this last season of How I Met Your Mother would be an emotional gut-punch," Bowman wrote. "But now, I’m not sure that even the moment that will end the show, the moment Ted meets those kids’ mother, will be the height of those poignant emotions. Because tonight, Ted let go of Robin. In a beautiful, simple, understated effect, she rose beyond his reach just like that balloon he loved as a kid."

Max Nicholson of IGN gave the episode 7.0/10, saying it was definitely engaging, and sometimes even funny, but it also ended on an irritating note.
