= How I Met Your Mother season 9 =

How I Met Your Mother
- Season 9
- DVD cover of The Ninth and Legendary Final Season. The Rest of Your Life Edition
- Starring: Josh Radnor; Jason Segel; Cobie Smulders; Cristin Milioti; Neil Patrick Harris; Alyson Hannigan
- No. of episodes: 24

Release
- Original network: CBS
- Original release: September 23, 2013 – March 31, 2014

Season chronology
- ← Previous; Season 8

The ninth and final season of How I Met Your Mother, an American sitcom created by Carter Bays and Craig Thomas, premiered on CBS on September 23, 2013, with two episodes, and concluded on March 31, 2014. The show was renewed for the final season on December 21, 2012, after cast member Jason Segel changed his decision to leave the show after the eighth season. Cristin Milioti, who was revealed as "The Mother" in the season 8 finale, was promoted to a series regular, the only time How I Met Your Mother added a new regular cast member. Season 9 consists of 24 episodes, each running approximately 22 minutes in length.

Taking place immediately after where the previous season left off, season 9 covers the events of a single weekend that leads up to Barney (Neil Patrick Harris) and Robin's (Cobie Smulders) wedding. During the course of the weekend, "The Mother" (Milioti) is separately introduced to Robin, Barney, Lily (Alyson Hannigan), and Marshall (Jason Segel), before finally meeting Ted (Josh Radnor). The season also features frequent flashbacks and flashforwards in order to fully integrate The Mother's character with the rest of the cast. Thomas said in an interview that season 9 is like "the Wild West – anything can happen".

In February 2013, Bays and Thomas teased that season 9 is "going to be a new way to tell the story". The initial reaction to the new storytelling structure of season 9 was mixed. Ethan Anderton from Screen Rant was concerned about how "24 episodes of television are going to be crafted from just three days of time", and Alan Sepinwall of HitFix was exasperated that after eight seasons, "They are really going to stretch Robin and Barney's wedding weekend out over the entire final season", though he expressed more optimism after the San Diego Comic-Con panel for the final season.

== Casting ==
The ninth season features a cast of six actors who receive star billing. Josh Radnor, Jason Segel, Cobie Smulders, Neil Patrick Harris, and Alyson Hannigan all reprise their roles in this season. Cristin Milioti, who was revealed as The Mother in the Season 8 finale, has been promoted to series regular, a first for the series.

How I Met Your Mother was initially scheduled to run for eight seasons after CBS ordered a seventh and eighth season in 2011. The show gained a resurgence in ratings during season seven, and CBS began discussing the possibility of ordering a ninth season. By 2012, Deadline Hollywood reported that CBS, 20th Century Fox, and all regular cast members except Segel wanted to continue with a ninth season. Segel had initially wanted to focus on his film career, leaving the fate of a ninth season uncertain. Co-creator Carter Bays observed that the negotiations were stressful, with a lot of "white-knuckled, nail-biting going on", but claimed that he was "confident that everything would work out". Craig Thomas noted the flexibility of the show's filming schedule, saying: "We've always done everything humanly possible to allow [the actors] to do other things." Segel ultimately decided to sign on for the final season, and season 9 was announced on December 21, 2012. Thomas and Bays were relieved that a deal had been reached for another season, fearing that having to wrap up the show in Season 8 would have "felt rushed" and been "disappointing".

It was a pretty big umbrella to fill, and yet Cristin [Milioti] is, against all odds, exactly what we were looking for. She made us laugh on 30 Rock, she made us swoon in Once, and her ukulele skills are no joke. We're thrilled to welcome her to the How I Met Your Mother family, and look forward to getting to know her – and the character she plays – much better in the coming final season.

— Carter Bays

Bays and Thomas were first introduced to Milioti as a possibility for playing The Mother through casting director Marisa Ross. Narrowing down the candidates to three actresses early on allowed the casting department to avoid a publicized casting call for The Mother. Milioti was flown into Los Angeles to do an on-camera "chemistry test" with Radnor as part of her audition. Harris, who is a Broadway fan and had recognized her in the makeup trailer, gave Milioti a hug and exclaimed "You're The Mother!" before she was actually cast. Milioti was chosen partly because her musical history and time on Broadway, including her performance in Once, would have allowed her to play the role of The Mother, a musician, more convincingly. Bays and Thomas wanted to avoid casting someone who was well-known, fearing that the audiences' preconceptions of a famous actress might spill into her performance in the role. Milioti's casting was well received by critics, many of whom lauded the show for resisting the urge to cast a familiar face and instead opting for a relative unknown. Bill Kuchman from TV.com observed that, because "Milioti is a blank canvas to many of us", she has the "freedom to create a How I Met Your Mother character that's free of the burden of being compared to her past work".

When asked at Comic-Con about guest stars, Bays revealed that, "If there's someone we loved over the course of the series, there's a good chance they're coming back [for the final season]." Returning guest stars include Wayne Brady and John Lithgow as Barney's brother and father, respectively, and Ellen D. Williams as Robin's co-worker Patrice.

Also reprising their roles as Ted's teenage daughter and son in "The Year 2030" are Lyndsy Fonseca and David Henrie. For the bulk of the series' run, stock footage of a younger Fonseca and Henrie from the series' first season have been used, the better to reflect the kids not aging while hearing their father tell his story. The kids' scenes included one key moment filmed before production on Season 2 began; that scene, according to Bays and Thomas, served as the climax to Ted's story of how he and the kids' mother met. The climax was filmed on a set closed to everyone except Bays, Thomas, a camera operator, and Fonseca and Henrie, who signed non-disclosure agreements. Fonseca states she had forgotten the details of the scene in the years since its filming, while Henrie states, "I do remember. I think I remember. We'll see."

=== Main cast ===
- Josh Radnor as Ted Mosby
- Jason Segel as Marshall Eriksen
- Cobie Smulders as Robin Scherbatsky
- Cristin Milioti as The Mother/Tracy McConnell
- Neil Patrick Harris as Barney Stinson
- Alyson Hannigan as Lily Aldrin
- Bob Saget as future Ted Mosby (voice only; uncredited)

=== Recurring cast and guest stars ===
- Lyndsy Fonseca as Ted's future daughter, Penny Mosby
- David Henrie as Ted's future son, Luke Mosby
- Robert Belushi as Linus, The Bartender
- Sherri Shepherd as Daphne
- Wayne Brady as James Stinson
- Marshall Manesh as Ranjit
- William Zabka as himself
- Roger Bart as Curtis
- Tim Gunn as himself/Barney's Personal Tailor
- Frances Conroy as Loretta Stinson
- Joe Nieves as Carl MacLaren, The Bartender
- Ellen D. Williams as Patrice
- Tracey Ullman as Genevieve Scherbatsky
- Cristine Rose as Virginia Mosby
- Anna Camp as Cassie
- Andrew Rannells as Darren
- Suzie Plakson as Judy Eriksen
- Abby Elliott as Jeanette Peterson
- Lou Ferrigno Jr. as Louis
- Ray Wise as Robin Scherbatsky, Sr.
- John Lithgow as Jerome Whittaker
- Ben Vereen as Sam Gibbs
- Taran Killam as Gary Blauman
- Rhys Darby as Hamish
- Virginia Williams as Claudia
- Matt Boren as Stuart
- Harry Groener as Clint
- Lin-Manuel Miranda as Gus
- Bryan Cranston as Hammond Druthers
- Jon Heder as Narshall
- James Van Der Beek as Simon Tremblay
- Stacy Keibler as Karina
- Nazanin Boniadi as Nora
- April Bowlby as Meg
- Katie Walder as Shannon
- Eva Amurri as Shelly
- Mark Derwin as Greg
- Rachel Bilson as Cindy
- Alan Thicke as himself
- Adam Paul as Mitch, The Naked Man
- Sarah Chalke as Stella Zinman
- Ashley Williams as Victoria
- Bill Fagerbakke as Marvin Eriksen Sr.
- Chris Kattan as himself/Jed Mosely
- Lucy Hale as Katie Scherbatsky
- Chris Elliott as Mickey Aldrin
- Kyle MacLachlan as The Captain
- Laura Bell Bundy as Becky
- Jennifer Morrison as Zoey Pierson
- Kal Penn as Kevin Venkataraghavan
- Alexis Denisof as Sandy Rivers
- David Burtka as Scooter
- Jorge Garcia as Steve "The Blitz" Henry
- Abigail Spencer as Blahblah/Carol
- Jai Rodriguez as Tom

== Release ==
=== Promotion ===
How I Met Your Mother's cast and crew hosted a panel at the 2013 Comic-Con for the first time in the show's history to promote season 9. The panel released a teaser trailer featuring Ted's children as adults, still listening to Ted tell his story eight years from when he first began. Angry at having spent years listening, they insist Ted finish his story so they can leave. The panel answered questions from fans as well as releasing select plot spoilers planned for the season.

Bays was enthusiastic about the trajectory of the season, saying that "we've never been in a place where it's July and we've plotted out the entire season, but we have this year because there's so much exciting stuff".

=== Distribution ===
Season 9 premiered on CBS on September 23, 2013, with two 22-minute episodes, and contained 24 episodes.

=== Reception ===
The ninth season of How I Met Your Mother received mostly positive reviews from critics, gaining a better reception than the previous season. The review aggregation website Rotten Tomatoes gave an 80% approval rating for the season with an average rating of 7.3/10, based on 10 reviews. At the end of the season, Max Nicholson of IGN gave the season a negative review, writing: "Many How I Met Your Mother fans felt betrayed after watching the series finale – and understandably so after season 9 spent 22 of its 24 episodes building towards a wedding that was basically meaningless. In retrospect, almost any other arc would have made a better foundation for season 9, including the series finale. In the end, unbalanced storytelling, lack of focus and unfunny detours led to the show's eventual downfall". Adam Vitcavage of Paste Magazine gave the season a lukewarm review, saying: "Nothing was over-the-top funny, but it was a perfect combination of laughter and sweet moments that really do make up for all of the lackluster episodes in the past few seasons."

== Episodes ==
Season nine episodes
No. overall	No. in season	Title	Directed by	Written by	Original release date	Prod. code	US viewers (millions)
185	1	"The Locket"	Pamela Fryman	Carter Bays & Craig Thomas	September 23, 2013	9ALH01	9.40
Friday 11 a.m.: On their way to Long Island for their wedding weekend, Robin and Barney discover that they have a cousin in common and worry that they are blood relatives. Marshall worries that Lily will see a picture his mother posted online which reveals that he has accepted a judgeship, and Lily confronts Ted about letting go of Robin.
186	2	"Coming Back"	Pamela Fryman	Carter Bays & Craig Thomas	September 23, 2013	9ALH02	9.40
Friday 12 p.m.: When James reveals that he is getting divorced, Robin worries about how Barney will take the news. Meanwhile, Marshall races to find a way to get to New York in time for the wedding, and Ted deals with being alone at a romantic hotel.
187	3	"Last Time in New York"	Pamela Fryman	Craig Gerard & Matthew Zinman	September 30, 2013	9ALH04	7.87
Friday 2 p.m.: When Lily discovers Ted's list of things he wants to do in New York before he leaves for Chicago, she helps him review the list. Robin and Barney try to find some time together before their relatives start arriving for their wedding.
188	4	"The Broken Code"	Pamela Fryman	Matt Kuhn	October 7, 2013	9ALH03	7.53
Friday 3 p.m.: Barney is angry at learning that Ted still has feelings for Robin, prompting Marshall to be their arbiter over Skype. Lily realizes she is Robin's only girlfriend, and wants to find a new one for her, but when she actually does, Lily gets jealous and scares her away.
189	5	"The Poker Game"	Pamela Fryman	Dan Gregor & Doug Mand	October 14, 2013	9ALH05	7.98
Friday 6 p.m.: When Barney is forced to pick sides in a fight between Robin and his mother, Lily coaches him on how not to ruin his relationship. Meanwhile, Ted and Marshall get into a dispute over wedding gifts and thank-you notes.
190	6	"Knight Vision"	Pamela Fryman	Chris Harris	October 21, 2013	9ALH07	7.64
Friday 9 p.m.: When Ted finds himself with three prospects to be his date for the wedding weekend, he chooses poorly. Meanwhile, Barney and Robin have a confrontation with their minister, and Marshall learns more about his driving companion, Daphne.
191	7	"No Questions Asked"	Pamela Fryman	Stephen Lloyd	October 28, 2013	9ALH06	7.63
Friday 11:30 p.m.: When Daphne sends a troubling text message to Lily, Marshall enlists the gang's help to remove the message while enforcing the "No Questions Asked" rule.
192	8	"The Lighthouse"	Pamela Fryman	Rachel Axler	November 4, 2013	9ALH08	8.67
Saturday 9 a.m.: When Robin and Loretta's conflict escalates, Barney is caught in the crossfire. Meanwhile, Marshall and Daphne have to contend with Ted's Step-father Clint when he briefly stows away on their road trip, and Ted and Cassie try to enjoy a trip to a lighthouse.
193	9	"Platonish"	Pamela Fryman	George Sloan	November 11, 2013	9ALH10	8.08
Saturday 11 a.m.: In a flashback episode, the gang recollects events from the fall of 2012 that may have played critical roles in their new directions.
194	10	"Mom and Dad"	Pamela Fryman	Carter Bays & Craig Thomas	November 18, 2013	9ALH09	8.11
Saturday 3 p.m.: Barney wants to see his father Jerome get back together with his mother, but James has other ideas. Meanwhile, an important wedding-related duty is ruined and Ted is blamed.
195	11	"Bedtime Stories"	Pamela Fryman	Carter Bays & Craig Thomas	November 25, 2013	9ALH12	7.64
Saturday 5 p.m.: Marshall tries to get Marvin to sleep by reciting three rhyming bedtime tales about his friends as they wind down their epic cross-country journey.
196	12	"The Rehearsal Dinner"	Pamela Fryman	Chuck Tatham	December 2, 2013	9ALH11	8.04
Saturday 8 p.m.: Barney becomes fixated on having his rehearsal dinner at a laser tag arena, much to Robin's dismay. Meanwhile, Ted doesn't come through on a promise, which aggravates Lily.
197	13	"Bass Player Wanted"	Pamela Fryman	Carter Bays & Craig Thomas	December 16, 2013	9ALH13	7.71
Saturday 10 p.m.: The gang encounters a guy at the wedding who intentionally stirs up trouble among them, and Marshall finally arrives at the Farhampton Inn.
198	14	"Slapsgiving 3: Slappointment in Slapmarra"	Pamela Fryman	Carter Bays & Craig Thomas	January 13, 2014	9ALH15	8.59
Sunday 1 a.m.: Barney gets unnerved as Marshall describes his extensive preparations to make the next slap from the "slap bet" as painful as humanly possible.
199	15	"Unpause"	Pamela Fryman	Chris Harris	January 20, 2014	9ALH14	8.83
Sunday 2 a.m.: When Barney reaches a "truth serum" state of drunkenness, Ted and Robin decide to take advantage and coax him into revealing secrets he's been hiding for years. Meanwhile, Marshall's exhaustive efforts to avoid fighting with Lily backfire dramatically.
200	16	"How Your Mother Met Me"	Pamela Fryman	Carter Bays & Craig Thomas	January 27, 2014	9ALH16	10.81
The 200th episode of the series recounts some of the significant events that took place in the mother's life during the eight years before she met Ted, and how a number of these events connected to him and the gang.
201	17	"Sunrise"	Pamela Fryman	Carter Bays & Craig Thomas	February 3, 2014	9ALH18	9.98
Sunday 5 a.m.: As the day of the wedding begins, Robin and Ted reminisce about past relationships while out searching for an inebriated Barney. Meanwhile, Marshall and Lily come to a resolution about their differences, and Barney befriends two young guys eager to meet women.
202	18	"Rally"	Pamela Fryman	Carter Bays & Craig Thomas	February 24, 2014	9ALH17	9.28
Sunday 8 a.m.: Barney suffers from a massive hangover on the morning of the wedding, and the gang must work quickly to find the special ingredients needed to make the remedy.
203	19	"Vesuvius"	Pamela Fryman	Barbara Adler	March 3, 2014	9ALH19	9.11
Lily becomes increasingly irritated by Robin's apparent emotional detachment about the wedding. Barney freaks out about which suit to wear, and asks Ted for help. Meanwhile, the gang watches a movie Ted has forbidden them to see, and Robin is happily surprised by the arrival of an important wedding guest.
204	20	"Daisy"	Pamela Fryman	Carter Bays & Craig Thomas	March 10, 2014	9ALH20	7.70
Sunday 2 p.m.: Marshall enlists Ted and Barney to help him investigate where Lily went when she walked out in the middle of their fight. The gang ultimately discovers that Lily is pregnant and it is later revealed that she and Marshall will have a daughter.
205	21	"Gary Blauman"	Pamela Fryman	Kourtney Kang	March 17, 2014	9ALH22	7.78
With only a couple of hours left before the wedding, the gang goes crazy reminiscing about past encounters with Gary Blauman when he unexpectedly shows up for the ceremony.
206	22	"The End of the Aisle"	Pamela Fryman	Carter Bays & Craig Thomas	March 24, 2014	9ALH21	9.04
Sunday 5:28 p.m.: With under an hour until the wedding, Barney and Robin suffer panic attacks. Meanwhile, Marshall and Lily work on rewriting the vows from their own wedding, and Marshall's Slap Bet with Barney finally ends.
207	23	"Last Forever"	Pamela Fryman	Carter Bays & Craig Thomas	March 31, 2014	9ALH23	13.13
208	24	"Last Forever"	Pamela Fryman	Carter Bays & Craig Thomas	March 31, 2014	9ALH24	13.13
It is revealed that while abroad, Barney and Robin decide to divorce after three years of marriage, but say things will never change. Barney has a daughter, Ellie from a one-night stand, and is unexpectedly happy. In 2030, Penny and Luke Mosby hear the ending to their father's story and we learn the mother died six years ago from an unspecified illness. After Ted finally finishes recounting how he met their mother, Ted's children advise him to ask out "Aunt Robin", so Ted goes to Robin's apartment with the blue French horn.
