= No Questions Asked (How I Met Your Mother) =

- How I Met Your Mother episode
- Episode no.: Season 9 Episode 7
- Directed by: Pamela Fryman
- Written by: Stephen Lloyd
- Original air date: October 28, 2013

Guest appearance
- Rhys Darby as Hamish

Episode chronology
← Previous "Knight Vision"	Next → "The Lighthouse"
- How I Met Your Mother season 9

"No Questions Asked" is the seventh episode of the ninth season of the CBS sitcom How I Met Your Mother, and the 191st episode overall.

== Plot ==
On Friday at 11.30 PM, 42.5 hours before the wedding, Daphne has just texted Lily about Marshall taking his dream job as a judge in New York. Marshall is worried of the consequences, as he and Lily had been planning on moving to Italy for her dream job. When Lily calls, Marshall is relieved to learn that Lily has not read the message yet and is complaining that they have received room 13 at the Farhampton Inn. Room 13 is rumored to be haunted by Captain Dearduff the Hooker, a supposed serial killer from 1843 who froze to death because his hook was stuck on the wall. Lily tries to get another room, but the receptionist (Rhys Darby) keeps using Captain Dearduff as an excuse to all of Lily's complaints.

Meanwhile, Barney plans to release 100 doves when he and Robin come out from the church. Unaware of Barney's plan, Robin mentions that the release of the doves would be problematic as her family will do a 21-gun salute with real bullets when they leave the church. Both Robin and Barney realize that they both always go on with their own plan without telling each other first.

That night, Lily has trouble sleeping when a stranger with a hook appears at her window, though it turns out to be Ted. It's revealed that Marshall called Ted to delete the text on Lily's cellphone using a "No questions asked" favor that Ted owes him. Ted had been trapped inside a public mail collection box, and had asked Marshall to free him while not allowing him to ask any questions as to why he had ended up there in the first place. Despite having been told the lock was broken, Ted insisted on climbing the drainpipe and entered Lily's room from the window. He manages to soothe Lily back to sleep by singing Marvin's lullaby, but his search is interrupted by Barney, who is in the air ducts leading to the room, just like the 'bad guy in Die Hard'. As with Ted, Marshall had also asked Barney to delete the text message using another "No questions asked" Barney owes him from when he was trapped in a Macy's utility room with soiled pants and when Marshall had to discharge him from the hospital for swallowing lucky charms. Their subsequent arguing wakes Lily up, but they are interrupted by the arrival of food from room service. Because she did not request the food, Lily goes to confront the receptionist downstairs.

When Robin appears from under the food service cart, she reveals that Marshall also called her to delete the text on Lily's phone with a "No questions asked" she owed him when he helped her escape from a mysterious group who knew her as "Nightfalcon". When they try to find the phone, they realize that Lily has taken it with her downstairs. Barney and Robin manage to develop an overcomplicated plan to take the phone while working together, resolving their issue with working alone. However, they are stunned when Ted interrupts their plan and learns that he has already deleted the text by getting Lily to destroy her phone using a "No questions asked" she owed him when she had been tied up by her kindergarten class.

Ted calls Marshall and asks why he did not use a "No questions asked" on Lily. Marshall explains that he never used one on Lily as he is always open and honest with her, making him realize he should not be keeping his news from her. Using Ted's phone, Marshall tells Lily the truth about his new job. Lily is furious and makes it clear a huge fight will ensue once they finally reunite.

The final scene reveals how Ted got trapped in the mailbox: he had sent a sappy letter to a woman, then changed his mind almost immediately and tried to retrieve it. He saw the mailbox was unlocked and climbed in when the mailman passed, who ended up locking it with Ted still inside.

== Critical reception ==
Donna Bowman of the A.V. Club graded the episode a B due to its "pleasant character moments", the flashbacks, and the manager's ghost stories. She stated that the quest to prevent Lily reading the text message may have been in the creative team's minds in planning the season. However, she added that the episode can divide the show's viewers because of lingering plot issues.

Max Nicholson of IGN gave the episode a 7.7/10 rating saying it "was a solid effort in weaving together a clever Halloween-esque story, especially considering the time-constricted circumstances. Despite a kinda lame ghost story and the routine Barney/Robin fare, this was definitely one of the stronger episodes we've seen this season."
