= Something New (How I Met Your Mother) =

- How I Met Your Mother episode
- The Mother (Cristin Milioti) is finally seen in this episode.
- Episode no.: Season 8 Episode 24
- Original air date: May 13, 2013

Guest appearances
- Cristin Milioti as The Girl with the Yellow Umbrella / The Mother; Casey Wilson as Krirsten; Keegan-Michael Key as Calvin; Suzie Plakson as Judy Eriksen; Marshall Manesh as Ranjit; Joe Nieves as Carl; Ned Rolsma as Marcus Eriksen; Brian Huskey as Rand; Lyndsy Fonseca as Daughter; David Henrie as Son; Cherub Moore as Hostess

Episode chronology
← Previous "Something Old"	Next → "The Locket"
- How I Met Your Mother season 8

"Something New" is the 24th and final episode of the eighth season of the American sitcom How I Met Your Mother, and the 184th episode overall. The episode aired on CBS on May 13, 2013. This was the episode that finally introduced the titular character of The Mother, played by Cristin Milioti.

== Plot ==
Future Ted tells his kids that, during the spring of 2013, he was making the final touches to the house he bought, while Barney and Robin were preparing for their wedding. As Lily and Marshall pack their things to go to Italy, Marshall's mother calls them, and Lily accidentally reveals that they are moving to Italy. To compensate, Marshall promises her that he and his son will visit her for a week. A relieved Lily visits Ted at MacLaren's, and he shows her his finished house.

Meanwhile, Barney and Robin are sitting in a bar when an obnoxious couple, Krirsten and Calvin, start bothering them—demanding to see their cigars and stealing their reserved table. Barney and Robin begin planning to break them up, so Robin puts her engagement ring in one of their champagne glasses. When Krirsten finds the ring, she excitedly responds that she will marry Calvin, but he has no intentions of doing so. After their break-up, Robin and Barney smoke happily in a park when the couple finds them, saying that after the fight, they decided to get married. Barney and Robin feel proud after seeing them happy.

When Lily and Ted arrive at his house, Lily realizes that Marshall's mother is trying to convince him not to go to Italy, after seeing some Facebook photos. When Lily notices a "For Sale" sign, Ted reveals that he is moving to Chicago because he cannot be around Robin after the wedding. Marshall calls Lily one last time, telling her that no matter what happens, he will move to Italy with her. After this, Marshall receives a call saying that his application to be a judge has been accepted. Marshall realizes he may not be able to join Lily in Italy.

Ted then tells Lily that after he found Robin digging for her old locket, only to discover an empty box, she interpreted it as a sign not to marry Barney and grabbed Ted's hand. Ted left, telling her he would see her at the wedding. He realizes that, after all these years, he still has feelings for Robin and would do anything to make her happy. Lily reveals where the locket is: before Ted nearly married Stella, Lily had found Robin drinking away her sorrows over Ted's upcoming wedding. Together, they went to the park where the locket was buried. Robin found it and took it to Ted's apartment, hiding it in a race-car pencil box, which she had planned to take with her to Japan. Ted realizes he still has that box and wants to give Robin the locket as a wedding gift.

With the wedding just 56 hours away, Ted moves out of his empty apartment and meets Lily to head to the wedding. When she asks how he plans to return to the city before moving to Chicago, Ted says he will take the train. Ranjit picks up Robin and Barney from their apartment. Marshall calls Lily again, and she reminds him that in a week, they will be living in Italy. When Marshall's brother Marcus points out that Marshall has not told her about the job, Marshall says it is "face-to-face" news.

During a closing montage, with all of the gang heading to Farhampton for the wedding, the titular "mother" (Cristin Milioti) is finally revealed to the audience for the first time, as she steps up to a counter at a Long Island Rail Station, carrying her signature yellow umbrella and bass guitar, and asks for a ticket to Farhampton—where she will eventually meet Ted.

== Production ==
Milioti's scene was filmed on March 27, 2013; John Lithgow unknowingly assisted her in making the flight to Los Angeles in time for the shoot, without knowing about her role in the show. Although the Mother only says one line, the scene was filmed in secrecy, with scripts kept exclusively on hardcopy and later destroyed. Milioti was driven to the studio under the cover of night, and members of the production staff served as extras during the train station scene. Show creators Carter Bays and Craig Thomas mentioned that they welcomed Milioti to the set as if "Jesus has risen", with Thomas describing it as "a very surreal moment. It was a moment we had envisioned for many years."

== Reception ==
=== Ratings ===
Including DVR viewing, the episode was watched by 10.44 million viewers with an 18–49 rating of 4.5.

=== Critical reception ===
Something New received acclaim. Donna Bowman of The A.V. Club gave the episode an A−. Max Nicholson of IGN scored the episode 7.5. TV.com's Bill Kuchman described the episode as "monumental" and said that it "did a fantastic job" of keeping the show's future "under wraps", adding that the production team took a risk in casting a relatively unknown actress as the Mother. Alan Sepinwall commented on the casting of the unknown Milioti:

"Something New" received widespread acclaim. Donna Bowman of The A.V. Club gave the episode an A− rating. Max Nicholson of IGN scored it a 7.5 out of 10. Bill Kuchman of TV.com described the episode as "monumental," praising how it "did a fantastic job" of keeping the show's future "under wraps." He also noted that the production team took a significant risk by casting a relatively unknown actress as the Mother. Alan Sepinwall echoed this sentiment, commenting on the choice to cast the lesser-known Cristin Milioti:

"So that we would have no preconceived notions about the Mother. We didn't spend years watching her on Scrubs, or The O.C., or even a few months on Good Morning, Miami. She is a blank slate, onto whom the show and its audience can project whatever qualities we feel should be in Ted Mosby's ideal woman, without insisting that Elliott Reed, Summer Roberts, or Chris Elliott's daughter would act that way, play bass that way, etc. She is the Mother; she was put on this world to cross Ted Mosby's path on the night of his best friend's wedding and make him forget all about Robin Scherbatzky and a move to Chicago. Earlier knowledge of her is not required, and maybe not even preferred."

== Soundtrack ==
"Simple Song" by The Shins is played the first time the audience sees the mother during the last few minutes of the episode.
