= Knight Vision =

- How I Met Your Mother episode
- Episode no.: Season 9 Episode 6
- Directed by: Pamela Fryman
- Written by: Chris Harris
- Cinematography by: Christian La Fountaine
- Editing by: Sue Federman
- Original air date: October 21, 2013

Guest appearances
- Sherri Shepherd as Daphne; Anna Camp as Cassie; Edward Herrmann as Reverend Lowell; India de Beaufort as Sophia; Michael Rider as Knight Templar; Joe O'Connor as Cassie's Dad

Episode chronology
← Previous "The Poker Game"	Next → "No Questions Asked"
- How I Met Your Mother season 9

"Knight Vision" is the sixth episode of the ninth season of the CBS sitcom How I Met Your Mother, and the 190th episode overall.

The episode received mixed reviews from online critics.

== Plot ==
On Friday at 9:00 PM, 45 hours before the wedding, the gang (minus Marshall) begin the wedding weekend officially with drinks as Barney and Robin remind Ted that he has the chance to hook up with one of the single women who'll be attending that evening. Barney compares the choice with the Holy Grail scene from Indiana Jones and the Last Crusade. Barney and Robin present Ted with three choices: Sophia, Cassie, and Grace (who won't arrive until later). Although Barney suggests Sophia, Ted goes for Cassie when she arrives and mentions the two will probably have 'fun' that weekend.

When Lily meets the wedding's officiant, Reverend Lowell, she tells him the story of how she met Marshall, which causes him to angrily leave. Barney and Robin admit to Lily that they had stolen Lily and Marshall's story when they learned that Lowell would disapprove of the story of how they actually met and turn down the request for him to marry them. Though they manage to deceive Lowell again when they discover that Lowell believes that Lily is lying, Lowell realizes they are lying when they become indignant at Lily's insulting descriptions when Lily uses the story of how Barney and Robin really met as the basis of the "real" story of how she met Marshall. Robin and Barney beg him to marry them anyway, but he steadfastly refuses and tells them to leave the church. Barney admits they should not have lied as he loves the story of how he and Robin got together and briefly touch on their sordid histories, only to find out a couple of minutes later that Lowell has died in his chair. This leaves them free to marry in the church, but without a minister.

Though Ted and Cassie seem to hit it off well, Ted's weekend plans quickly begin to derail with each choice he makes. Cassie becomes despondent and dependent on Ted when she learns that she has lost her job, where she was hated by everyone, her ex-boyfriend is also a guest at the wedding and has hooked up with Sophia, and her parents unsympathetically leave Ted to comfort Cassie after he meets them. When their attempts to become intimate become increasingly unlikely, Cassie graciously allows Ted to leave her so he can still enjoy his weekend. However, everyone already believes that he and Cassie are a couple; when Grace finally arrives, Ted's last attempt to find another date is ruined when he proposes a toast in memory of Reverend Lowell, only to discover that he was Cassie's uncle. Ted excuses himself and says goodbye to Grace as he is forced to spend the rest of the night comforting Cassie. Future Ted notes that all he did that night was choose poorly, so he didn't hook up with anyone that weekend. However, he now knows that if he had, he probably would never have met his wife and remarks that perhaps he had chosen wisely in the long-run.

During their long drive to Farhampton, Marshall tells Daphne of how he needs to be tough and convince Lily to give up her dream job in Italy so he can remain in New York and be a judge. Daphne tries to coach Marshall through the conversation and ensuing argument he is bound to have with Lily, but keeps forcing him to start over. When Daphne learns that Marshall has already taken the job, she chews him out for not considering his wife's wishes or her dream, telling him that her husband was the same in regards to her career. When Marshall asks what her job is, he is furious to learn that she is a lobbyist for a big oil company and believes that Daphne wants him to refuse the job because he is an environmentalist. Marshall later apologizes for yelling at Daphne and agrees that he needs to be fair with Lily and not tough. Daphne accepts and apologizes, as she was so angry with Marshall, she sent Lily a text message telling her about Marshall's new job and how he's already taken it. Marshall is horrified, as his phone begins to ring.

== Critical reception ==
Max Nicholson of IGN gave the episode a 6.4/10 rating saying it "found a few funny moments in a sea of predictable narrative." The A.V. Club's Donna Bowman graded the episode an A−, stating that the Indiana Jones elements and Ted's reaction to the Knight's appearances were enough for the episode, but the Barney–Robin story is another good example of the actors' chemistry.

Jessica Goodman of The Huffington Post stated that the episode "solidified" the waiting game the season would largely be, though she noted that it was "a step up from last week's debacle." HitFix's Alan Sepinwall expressed that after despairing over the poor quality of the previous two episodes ("every idea, joke and person made me cringe"), this episode was "fairly painless", and stated that "at least this particular Robin/Barney story did not try to pretend they were anything less than awful".
