= The Locket (How I Met Your Mother) =

- How I Met Your Mother episode
- Ted gives Robin a photo of the gang instead of her locket.
- Episode no.: Season 9 Episode 1
- Directed by: Pamela Fryman
- Written by: Carter Bays; Craig Thomas
- Original air date: September 23, 2013

Guest appearances
- Wayne Brady as James Stinson; Suzie Plakson as Judy Eriksen; Sherri Shepherd as Daphne

Episode chronology
← Previous "Something New"	Next → "Coming Back"
- How I Met Your Mother season 9

"The Locket" is the first episode of the ninth season of the CBS sitcom How I Met Your Mother, and the 185th episode overall.

== Plot ==
On Friday at 11am, 55 hours before the wedding, the gang all set out on their separate trips to the wedding that will change their lives, as well as the life of the woman who will become Ted's wife.

Robin and Barney are being driven to Farhampton by Ranjit. They worry about which of their relatives will be the "Wild Card" (the person most likely to ruin the wedding). As they go through their family members, they find they share a "Crazy Cousin Mitch" and become horrified at the idea that they could be related. Though they try to make light of the situation, both are too repulsed by the notion to be affectionate with each other. After a bout of awkwardness, Robin finally speaks to her grandmother who confirms that Mitch is only related to them through marriage (for Barney) and adoption (for Robin). The awkwardness instantly lifts and Barney is not worried about a Wild Card anymore, promising it will be a "legendary" wedding. When Robin notes that he did not insert his usual "Wait for it" catchphrase into the middle, Barney tells Robin that thanks to her, he does not have to wait.

In Minnesota, Marshall is waiting on the plane for New York with Marvin while worrying about how to tell Lily about his job offer and irritating his seat neighbor, Daphne (Sherri Shepherd). When he discovers that his mother Judy (Suzie Plakson) has posted a photo on the internet of Marvin that reveals how Marshall will become a judge, Marshall realizes that the photo will also be forwarded to Lily. Marshall phones Judy to teach her how to remove the image, which delays the plane from taking off. A fight between Marshall and Daphne ensues, which results in both of them being removed from the plane. At the airport terminal, Marshall accesses his mother's account to delete the photo himself, but also finds himself stumped as to how to do it. However, the photo is successfully deleted when Marvin hits a random key on the keyboard. When Marshall and Daphne learn there is another flight to New York soon but there is only one seat available, the two race each other across the airport.

Meanwhile, Ted and Lily start their drive towards the Farhampton Inn. However Lily is soon irritated by Ted's behavior, which includes wearing driving gloves and taking her on long detours to see tourist stops. Lily eventually cannot take any more and has Ted drop her off at a train station. She gets on the train to Farhampton and ends up sitting just a few seats away from Ted's future wife. When she gets a notification on her phone about Marvin's photo, she decides to ignore it because all Judy's photos so far have been emotional blackmail to prevent her and Marshall from moving to Italy. When she starts to feel guilty about not looking at a photo of her son, the Mother notices and offers Lily a cookie, which Future Ted describes to his kids as "How Aunt Lily met your Mother". The two sit together and Lily sounds off about Ted's driving habits (which the Mother secretly thinks are cool) as the Mother tries to stop Lily from looking at Judy's picture of Marvin. The Mother notes that it seems like Ted wanted Lily to leave and Lily suddenly remembers the locket that Robin had been looking for that Ted thought he had. She recalls how Ted discovered he did not have the locket, but considered the idea that when he lived briefly with his former girlfriend Stella, she might have ended up with the locket and taken it with her to Los Angeles. Though Ted promises not to fly to Los Angeles to retrieve the locket, Lily worries that Ted has done just that, and is heading to the wedding with the locket now. Lily panics that Ted is going to ruin the wedding by using the locket as a last-ditch effort to win Robin back, but realizes that her bad mood can be partly attributed to not seeing Marvin for a week. The Mother allows her to look at the photo Judy posted, but it is deleted just before it can be opened. Lily begins to get upset, and the Mother hugs her in support.

Arriving at the Farhampton Inn, Ted is about to give Robin the gift when Lily tackles him (which Future Ted reveals was not the only time she tackled someone that weekend). Robin opens it, and finds not the locket, but a picture of the gang together taken soon after they started hanging out together. Ted tells Robin all her friends want is happiness for her and Barney. Lily apologizes for thinking the worst as Ted promises that he will not do anything insane and Future Ted claims that at that moment in time he meant it. However, Future Ted admits that he was a possible "Wild Card" at the wedding; unknown to Lily, Ted had actually flown to Los Angeles four days prior to look for the locket.

== Critical reception ==
Donna Bowman of The A.V. Club gave the double-episode premiere of "The Locket" and "Coming Back" a B+ rating. Alan Sepinwall of Uproxx also rated the double-episode saying that there was many "annoying little things, and a few big ones" but one big thing they got absolutely right: That was the Mother.

Bill Kuchman of Popculturology said the episode paled in comparison to the previous season's premiere, saying, "You want a legendary HIMYM season premiere? Go watch "Farhampton," last season's premiere. ... That's a season premiere. And that's the promise that HIMYM's final season holds."

Max Nicholson of IGN gave the episode a 7.8/10 rating saying it "delivered a relatively promising start to the wedding weekend."
