= Cristin Milioti =

American actress and musician (born 1985)

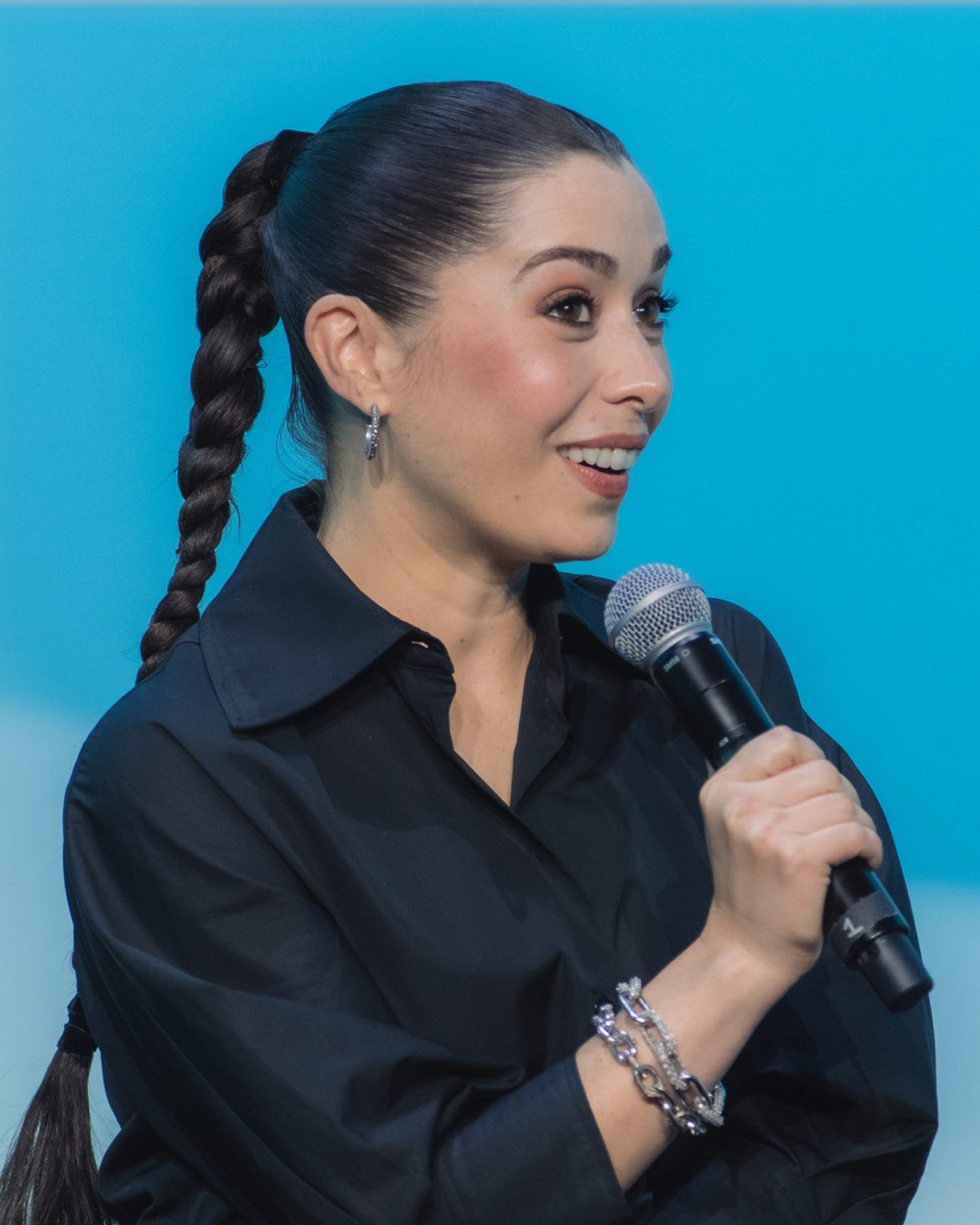
- Milioti in 2024
- Born: August 16, 1985 (age 41); Cherry Hill, New Jersey, U.S.
- Education: Drew University
- Occupations: Actress; singer; musician
- Years active: 2006–present

Cristin Milioti (born August 16, 1985) is an American actress and musician. Known for her roles on stage and screen, she has received various accolades including a Grammy Award and a Primetime Emmy Award, as well as nominations for an Actor Award and a Tony Award.

Milioti started her career with supporting roles on television, including as Catherine Sacrimoni in the HBO drama series The Sopranos (2006–2007). She rose to prominence for her performance as Tracy McConnell in the CBS sitcom How I Met Your Mother (2013–2014). She earned critical acclaim for her portrayal of Sofia Falcone in the HBO crime drama series The Penguin (2024), for which she earned the Primetime Emmy Award for Outstanding Lead Actress in a Limited or Anthology Series or Movie.

Milioti appeared in the Fox sitcom The Mindy Project (2015–2016), the second season of the FX anthology crime series Fargo (2015), the Netflix science fiction series Black Mirror (2017, 2025), the HBO Max comedy series Made for Love (2021–2022), and the Peacock comedy mystery series The Resort (2022). She also starred in films such as The Wolf of Wall Street (2013), It Had to Be You (2015), Palm Springs (2020), and Buddy (2026).

On stage, she acted on Broadway in the plays The Lieutenant of Inishmore (2006) and Coram Boy (2007) before starring in the musical Once (2011–2013), which earned her a Grammy Award as well as a nomination for the Tony Award for Best Actress in a Musical.

== Early life ==
Milioti was born on August 16, 1985, in Cherry Hill, New Jersey, a suburb of Philadelphia. She is of Italian descent, and calls her family "Olive Garden Italian". In middle school, she found her love of acting at Long Lake Camp for the Arts in Long Lake, New York. She graduated in 2003 from Cherry Hill High School East, where she began performing in school plays. She took acting-classes at New York University, but dropped out during her sophomore year, admitting that her dropping out was a result of her being "wildly unhappy there".

== Career ==
=== 2006–2010: Early roles and Broadway debut ===
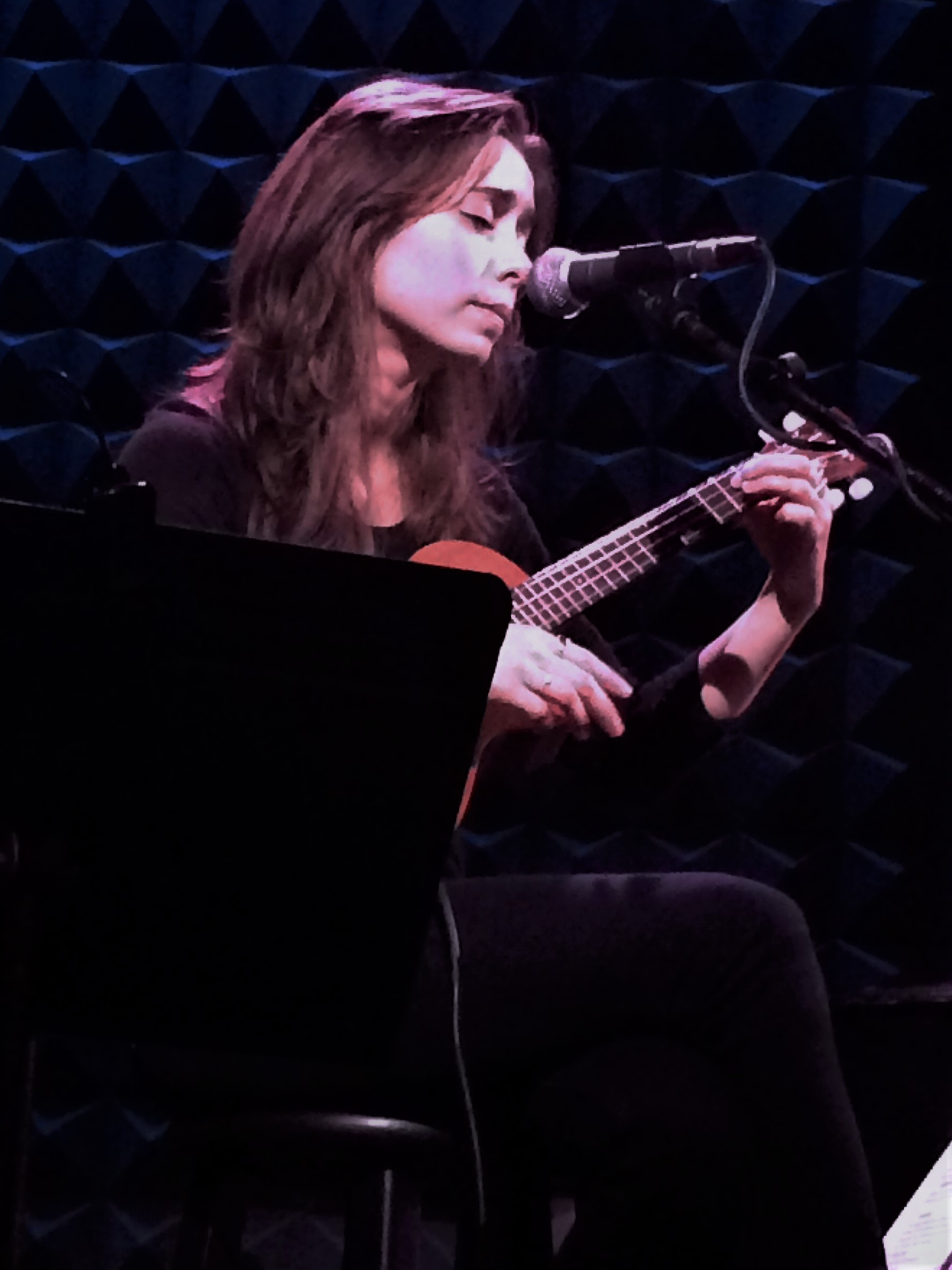
Milioti playing a ukulele in 2013

Milioti's first acting roles were bit parts in national advertising campaign ads, notably one for the Ford Edge. She appeared in television programs such as The Sopranos and films such as Greetings from the Shore. Milioti appeared in stage performances. In 2007, she appeared on Broadway as Alice Ashbrook in Helen Edmundson's award-winning adaptation of Jamila Gavin's novel Coram Boy. In 2010, she starred in That Face, and was nominated for the Lucille Lortel Award for Outstanding Lead Actress in a Play for her work in Stunning.

=== 2011–2019: Once and television work ===
In 2012, she received a Tony Award nomination for Best Actress in a Musical for her portrayal of Girl in Once, a musical in which she performed from 2011 to 2013. Of her performance, Ben Brantley of the New York Times wrote: "It's not easy playing a winsome life force with a foreign accent. But Ms. Milioti has mastered the assignment brilliantly. She brings a new confidence to her portrayal, and an enhanced mixture of wit and wisdom, which suggests a maturity in youth, a fatalism hard won during an Eastern European childhood. And together she and Mr. Kazee exude a chemistry that is all the more achingly real for being so subdued." Her Once performance, with fellow principal soloist Steve Kazee, earned the 2013 Grammy Award for Best Musical Theater Album. She also read aloud a short story for the 2011 This American Life episode "Adventure". In 2012, she appeared on several songs of Glen Hansard's debut album Rhythm and Repose.

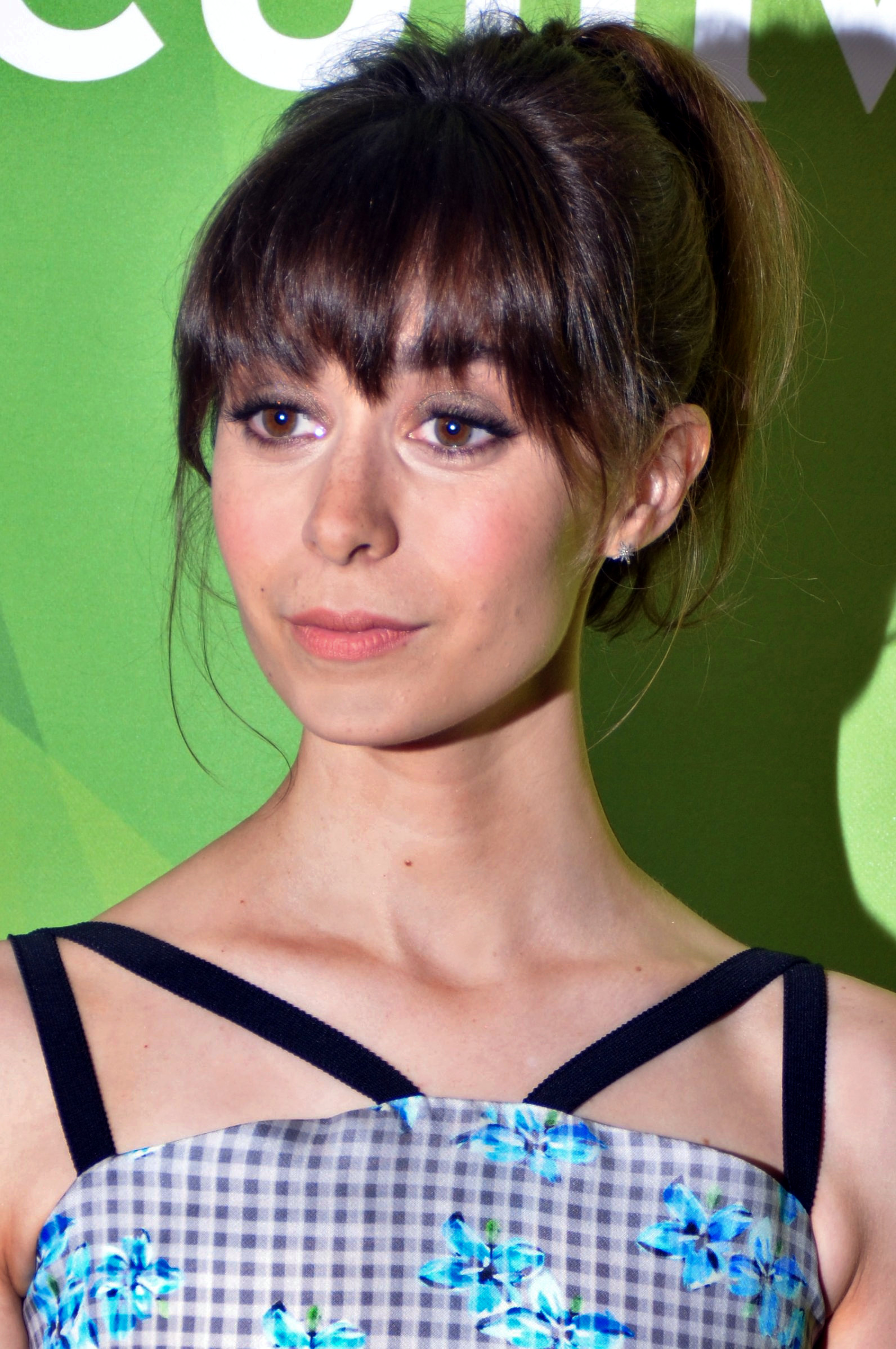
Milioti in 2014

In 2013, Milioti was cast in the CBS sitcom How I Met Your Mother as the titular Mother, appearing for the first time in the season eight finale titled "Something New", and was promoted to a series regular for the show's ninth and final season. Milioti portrayed Jordan Belfort's first wife, Teresa Petrillo, in the 2013 Martin Scorsese film The Wolf of Wall Street. In February 2014, she was cast as Zelda, the female lead on NBC's comedy A to Z which premiered that October and aired for one season of 13 episodes. In 2015, she co-starred on the second season of FX's Fargo as Betsy Solverson, the cancer-stricken wife of state trooper Lou Solverson and mother of future deputy Molly Solverson. In 2017, Milioti appeared in the fourth season of the sci-fi anthology show Black Mirror in the episode "USS Callister" as Nanette Cole, a newly employed game developer whose digital recreation becomes trapped in a virtual simulator game, a role she reprised in the 2025 seventh season episode "USS Callister: Into Infinity".

=== 2020–present: The Penguin and acclaim ===
In 2020, Milioti starred in the sci-fi/comedy Palm Springs, which premiered at the Sundance Film Festival in January and on Hulu in July. In 2021, she starred in the HBO Max dark comedy series Made for Love as the entrapped wife of a tech billionaire from whom she runs away.

In 2024, Milioti starred as Sofia Falcone in the HBO spin-off miniseries of The Batman titled The Penguin, opposite Colin Farrell. For her performance, she won the Critics' Choice Television Award for Best Actress in a Movie/Miniseries and Primetime Emmy Award for Outstanding Lead Actress in a Limited or Anthology Series or Movie.

== Personal life ==
In February 2021, Milioti worked with PETA in a video featuring her adopted dog, Rupert, which advocated for adopting a dog over purchasing one from breeders.

== Acting credits ==
=== Film ===
Key
†	Denotes films that have not yet been released

Year	Title	Role	Notes
2007	Greetings from the Shore	Didi	
2009	Year of the Carnivore	Sammy Smalls	
2012	Sleepwalk with Me	Janet Pandamiglio	
2012	I am Ben	The Journalist	
2012	The Brass Teapot	Brandi	
2013	Bert and Arnie's Guide to Friendship	Faye	
2013	The Wolf of Wall Street	Teresa Petrillo	
2014	The Occupants	Lucy	
2015	It Had to Be You	Sonia	
2017	Breakable You	Maud Weller	
2020	Palm Springs	Sarah Wilder	
2025	In Your Dreams	Joanne Ting (voice)	
2026	Buddy	Grace Gardner	
2027	The Comeback King †	TBA	Completed

=== Television ===
Key
†	Denotes television productions that have not yet been released

Year	Title	Role	Notes
2006	3 lbs	Megan Rafferty	Episode: "Bad Boys"
2006–2007	The Sopranos	Catherine Sacrimoni	3 episodes
2009	The Unusuals	Sketch Artist	2 episodes
2010	The Good Wife	Onya Eggertson	Episode: "Taking Control"
2011	30 Rock	Abby Flynn / Abby Grossman	Episode: "TGS Hates Women"
2011	Nurse Jackie	Monica	Episode: "...Deaf Blind Tumor Pee-Test"
2013–2014	How I Met Your Mother	Tracy McConnell / The Mother	Guest role (season 8), main role (season 9); 14 episodes
2014–2015	A to Z	Zelda Vasco	Main role
2015	Family Guy	Andrea Cricket	Voice role; episode: "Roasted Guy"
2015	Fargo	Betsy Solverson	Recurring role (season 2); 9 episodes
2015–2016	The Mindy Project	Whitney	Recurring role; 5 episodes
2016–2018	The Venture Bros.	Sirena / Various voices	Recurring voice role; 8 episodes
2017, 2025	Black Mirror	Nanette Cole / Capt. Cole	Episodes: "USS Callister" and "USS Callister: Into Infinity"
2018	No Activity	Frankie	Main role (season 2); 8 episodes
2019	Modern Love	Maggie Mitchell	2 episodes
2020	Mythic Quest: Raven's Banquet	Bean	Episode: "A Dark Quiet Death"
2020	Death to 2020	Kathy Flowers	Television special
2021	Ziwe	Friend	Episode: "55%"
2021	The Simpsons	Barb	Voice role; episode: "A Serious Flanders"
2021	Death to 2021	Kathy Flowers	Television special
2021–2022	Made for Love	Hazel Green	Main role
2022	The Resort	Emma Reed	Main role
2023	Bob's Burgers	Alice	Voice role; episode: "Radio No You Didn't"
2023	Teenage Euthanasia	Juggsaw	Voice role; episode: "Viva La Flappanista"
2024	Hit-Monkey	Iris McHenry	Voice role (season 2): 9 episodes
2024	The Penguin	Sofia Falcone / The Hangman	Limited series; main role
TBA	Seven Sisters †	TBA	Upcoming series; main role

=== Theater ===
Year	Title	Role	Venue(s)	Ref.
2006	The Lieutenant of Inishmore	Mairead (Note: (understudy))	Lyceum Theatre, Broadway	
2007	Coram Boy	Alice Ashbrook	Imperial Theatre, Broadway	
2007	The Devil's Disciple	Essie	Irish Repertory Theatre, Off-Broadway	
2009	The Heart is a Lonely Hunter	Mick Kelly	New York Theatre Workshop, Off-Broadway	
2009	Stunning	Lily	Lincoln Center Theater, Off-Broadway	
2010	The Little Foxes	Alexandra	New York Theatre Workshop, Off-Broadway	
2010	That Face	Mia	Manhattan Theatre Club, Off-Broadway	
2011	Once	Girl	American Repertory Theatre, Cambridge	
2011	Once	Girl	New York Theatre Workshop, Off-Broadway	
2012–2013	Once	Girl	Bernard B. Jacobs Theatre, Broadway	
2015–2016	Lazarus	Elly	New York Theatre Workshop, Off-Broadway	
2017	Moscow Moscow Moscow Moscow Moscow Moscow	Masha	Williamstown Theatre Festival, Williamstown	
2017	After the Blast	Anna	Lincoln Center Theater, Off-Broadway	

== Awards and nominations ==
Organizations	Year	Category	Work	Result	Ref.
Actor Awards	2024	Outstanding Actress in a Miniseries or Television Movie	The Penguin	Nominated	
Astra Film Awards (Note: Previously known as Hollywood Critics Association Film Awards.)	2020	Breakthrough Performance - Actress	Palm Springs	Won	
Astra TV Awards (Note: Previously known as Hollywood Critics Association TV Awards.)	2021	Best Actress in a Streaming Series, Comedy	Made for Love	Nominated	
Astra TV Awards	2025	Best Actress in a Limited Series or TV Movie	The Penguin	Won	
Astra TV Awards	2025	Best Cast Ensemble in a Limited Series or TV Movie	The Penguin	Won	
Astra TV Awards	2025	Best Supporting Actress in a Limited Series or TV Movie	Black Mirror: USS Callister: Into Infinity	Won	
Critics' Choice Awards	2016	Best Supporting Actress in a Movie/Miniseries	Fargo	Nominated	
Critics' Choice Awards	2024	Best Actress in a Limited Series or Movie Made for Television	The Penguin	Won	
Critics' Choice Super Awards	2020	Best Actress in a Science Fiction/Fantasy Movie	Palm Springs	Won	
Critics' Choice Super Awards	2025	Best Actress in a Superhero Series, Limited Series or TV Movie	The Penguin	Won	
Critics' Choice Super Awards	2025	Best Actress in a Science Fiction/Fantasy Series, Limited Series	Black Mirror: USS Callister: Into Infinity	Nominated	
Dorian TV Awards	2025	Best TV Performance — Drama	The Penguin	Nominated	
Golden Globe Awards	2024	Best Actress - Miniseries or Television Film	The Penguin	Nominated	
Gotham TV Awards	2025	Outstanding Lead Performance in a Limited Series	The Penguin	Nominated	
Grammy Awards	2013	Best Musical Theater Album	Once	Won	
Independent Spirit Awards	2024	Best Lead Performance in a New Scripted Series	The Penguin	Nominated	
Lucille Lortel Awards	2011	Outstanding Lead Actress	Stunning	Nominated	
Lucille Lortel Awards	2012	Outstanding Lead Actress	Once	Nominated	
Lucille Lortel Awards	2018	Outstanding Lead Actress in a Play	After the Blast	Nominated	
MTV Movie & TV Awards	2018	Most Frightened Performance	Black Mirror: USS Callister	Nominated	
Online Film & Television Association	2025	Best Actress in a Motion Picture, Limited or Anthology Series	The Penguin	Won	
Primetime Emmy Awards	2025	Outstanding Lead Actress in a Limited or Anthology Series or Movie	The Penguin	Won	
Satellite Awards	2024	Best Actress in a Miniseries or Television Film	The Penguin	Nominated	
Saturn Awards	2024	Best Supporting Actress in a Television Series	The Penguin	Won	
Tony Awards	2012	Best Actress in a Musical	Once	Nominated	

== Discography ==
Soundtrack album

List of soundtrack albums, with selected chart positions
Title	Album details
Once (Original Broadway Cast Recording)	Released: March 13, 2012; Label: Masterworks Broadway; Formats: CD, vinyl, digital download, streaming
How I Met Your Music	Released: September 24, 2012; Label: Fox Music; Formats: CD, digital download, streaming
Lazarus Original Cast Recording	Released: October 21, 2016; Label: Columbia Records / RCA / Sony Music; Formats: CD, vinyl, digital download, streaming

Songs

List of non-single appearances
Title	Year	Other artist(s)	Album	Ref.
"If You Want Me"	2012	—N/a	Once: (Original Broadway Cast Recording)	
"The Hill"	2012	—N/a	Once: (Original Broadway Cast Recording)	
"Falling Slowly (Reprise)"	2012	Steve Kazee and the Once Ensemble	Once: (Original Broadway Cast Recording)	
"La Vie En Rose"	2014	—N/a	How I Met Your Music	
"Changes"	2016	—N/a	Lazarus (Original Cast Recording)	
"Absolute Beginners"	2016	The cast of Lazarus (Note: Which included: Michael C. Hall, Michael Esper, Sophia Anne Caruso and Krystina Alabado)	Lazarus (Original Cast Recording)	
"Always Crashing in the Same Car"	2016	—N/a	Lazarus (Original Cast Recording)	
"Delete Delete"	2018	Boots and Run the Jewels	#DARKDAZE	
"715 Creeks"	2021	—N/a	Non-album single	

== See also ==
- List of Primetime Emmy Award winners
