= Masterworks Broadway =

- Masterworks Broadway logo]
- Parent company: Sony Music Entertainment
- Founded: 2006
- Distributor: Sony Masterworks
- Genre: Musical theatre
- Country of origin: U.S.
- Official website: www.masterworksbroadway.com

Masterworks Broadway is a record label created by the consolidation of Sony Music Entertainment's Broadway theatre music divisions, Columbia Broadway Masterworks and RCA Victor Records' Broadway series.

Masterworks Broadway's recent releases include the revival new cast recording of South Pacific (2008), Avenue Q (2003), Hairspray (2002) and Chicago (1997).

The record label's chief competitors are Angel Broadway, owned by UMG and Decca Broadway, which is also owned by Universal Music Group.

== See also ==
- List of record labels
