= The Poker Game (How I Met Your Mother) =

- How I Met Your Mother episode
- Episode no.: Season 9 Episode 5
- Directed by: Pamela Fryman
- Written by: Dan Gregor & Doug Mand
- Original air date: October 14, 2013

Guest appearances
- Billy Zabka as himself; Frances Conroy as Loretta Stinson; Virginia Williams as Claudia Bowers; Marshall Manesh as Ranjit; Matt Boren as Stuart Bowers; Sherri Shepherd as Daphne

Episode chronology
← Previous "The Broken Code"	Next → "Knight Vision"
- How I Met Your Mother season 9

"The Poker Game" is the fifth episode of the ninth season of the CBS sitcom How I Met Your Mother, and the 189th episode overall.

== Plot ==
On Friday at 6:00 PM, 48 hours before the wedding, Barney, Ted, Robin, Lily, James, Marshpillow, Tim Gunn, Ranjit, and Billy Zabka continue to play poker. All but Barney, Robin, James, Billy Zabka, and Ranjit fold before long. During the later stages of the game, Robin dares James to wager his own wedding ring over his frequent jabs against getting married. Robin wins the ring, but James later brings in his mother Loretta into the mix to try forcing her to give it back. As a result, Barney is caught between siding with his mother and brother or Robin (who defeats Loretta in a round of strip poker and gets her special blouse). Lily counsels him that in a marriage, the husband always stands by the wife. This prompts Barney to declare that he's severing his ties to James and Loretta after realizing that they're both selfish, but claims Robin ordered it so.

Lily is visibly displeased at Ted's plans to give Barney and Robin three wedding gifts. Future Ted says her anger stemmed from Ted's apparent failure to give them a wedding gift six years before; Marshall repeatedly signaled Ted about it ever since (even as he was about to marry Stella). When Ted is questioned about the present, he insists that he sent them a coffeemaker as his gift but also dropped his own hints for Marshall to acknowledge it. Lily discovers that Ted never got a thank-you note because Stuart passed it off as his present; he claims the item further strengthened his marriage to Claudia. Ted reconciles with Marshall by placing an order with their old Chicago pizza haunt Gazzola's and having a delivery man send it to Marshall as he and Daphne pass through Chicago. Future Ted then reveals he received a thank-you note from Marshall four months later.

Loretta lets Robin keep the blouse, but warns that she's not yet finished with her.

== Critical reception ==
The A.V. Club's Donna Bowman graded the episode a B+, stating that weddings will always have something that offends some of your loved ones. She hinted however, that the ending may set the stage for a bigger showdown between Robin and Loretta later in the season.

Bill Kuchman of Popculturology praised the episode for its flashbacks to the show's past, calling the Katie Holmes as the Slutty Pumpkin cameo a "nice callback to HIMYM's history."

Max Nicholson of IGN gave the episode a 7.3/10 rating saying it "made good use of flashbacks, but nevertheless felt a bit stagnant."
