= The Mother (How I Met Your Mother) =

Fictional character on the CBS sitcom How I Met Your Mother

Tracy McConnell
- How I Met Your Mother character
- Tracy appearing in "The Locket"
- First appearance: "Lucky Penny" (unseen) "Something New" (seen)
- Last appearance: "Last Forever"
- Created by: Carter Bays; Craig Thomas
- Portrayed by: Cristin Milioti

In-universe information
- Aliases: The Mother, T.M.
- Gender: Female
- Spouse: Ted Mosby (m. 2020)
- Significant others: Max (boyfriend, deceased); Louis (ex-boyfriend)
- Children: Penny Mosby (daughter); Luke Mosby (son)
- Nationality: American
- Born: September 13, 1984 (Note: The Mother celebrates her 21st birthday on the day that "Pilot" is set. The pilot is set on September 19, 2005.)
- Died: 2024 (aged 40); Westchester County, New York (broadcast ending)

Tracy Mosby (née McConnell) ("The Mother") is the title character from the CBS television sitcom How I Met Your Mother. The show, narrated by Future Ted (Bob Saget), tells the story of how Ted Mosby (Josh Radnor) met his children's mother. Tracy McConnell appears in eight episodes between season 2 and season 8, from "Lucky Penny" to "The Time Travelers", as an unseen character; she was first seen fully in season 8 finale "Something New" and was promoted to a main character in season 9. She is played by Cristin Milioti.

The story of how Ted met The Mother is the framing device behind the series; many facts about her are revealed throughout the series, including that Ted once unwittingly owned her umbrella before accidentally leaving it behind in her apartment. Ted and The Mother meet at the Farhampton train station following Barney Stinson (Neil Patrick Harris) and Robin Scherbatsky's (Cobie Smulders) wedding; this scene is shown in "Last Forever", the series finale. The Mother's death from an unspecified terminal illness in 2024, also revealed in the series finale, received a mixed reaction from fans.

== Casting ==
During its first eight seasons, the sitcom How I Met Your Mother often hinted at the unseen character of The Mother. Well-known actresses often made guest appearances on the show. Many fans expected that another would play the role, but creators Carter Bays and Craig Thomas wanted an unknown. Using Anne Hathaway and Amy Adams as examples, Thomas said that "We didn't want it to be a big famous star because we didn't want the wider audience to have associations with whatever actress this would be. The whole idea is that Ted's never seen this woman before, so it better feel that way to the audience", similar to how Cobie Smulders being cast as Robin Scherbatsky had "kept the show alive" when it began. They also did not want a large casting call.

Bays and Thomas chose Cristin Milioti after seeing her on 30 Rock and Once; her musical ability was also helpful, as The Mother had been described as a band member. Milioti filmed her first scene for the last episode of season 8 having never watched How I Met Your Mother before. She only learned of the character's importance after binge watching the show during the summer.

== Character history ==
The Mother was born on September 13, 1984.

The Mother, joined by her roommate Kelly (Ahna O'Reilly), awaits the arrival of her boyfriend Max, only to receive a call informing her of his death. After the funeral service, she returns to the apartment to open Max's last gift to her—a ukulele. The Mother spends the next few years grieving the passing of the man she believes was her one true love.

In "Wait for It", the short story of how they met involving her yellow umbrella is revealed. In "No Tomorrow", Ted finds the umbrella at a club and takes it home after attending a St. Patrick's Day party which she also attended, as it had been two and a half years since Max's death. She is still grieving, but Kelly encourages her to go out and date again, bringing her to the same bar where Barney Stinson (Neil Patrick Harris) and Ted are celebrating. The two women run into Mitch (Adam Paul), her old orchestra instructor; The Mother offers to give Mitch her cello for his work at a school and they head to her apartment. Mitch tries to seduce her with a move called "The Naked Man", but she turns him down. Nevertheless, Mitch encourages her to pursue her dreams. The Mother expresses her desire to end poverty by taking up economics in college.

On his first day of teaching as Professor Mosby, as seen in the season 4 finale "The Leap", he is seen in front of the classroom of students, one of which Future Ted says is the titular mother. But in the first episode of season 5, "Definitions", it is revealed that he was actually in the wrong classroom—Economics instead of Architecture. At the same time in "How Your Mother Met Me", the Mother sits her first session in Economics 305 and meets another graduate student named Cindy (Rachel Bilson), whom she offers to move in with as her roommate. They see Ted enter the room, but when he announces the subject, The Mother thinks she is in the wrong room and runs off. She heads back to the room after seeing Ted scramble to his actual classroom.

Later, in "Girls Versus Suits", Ted dates Cindy, not knowing that her roommate is his future wife. Throughout the episode, Ted notes that Cindy had spent most of their first date talking jealously about her roommate. When in Cindy and the Mother's apartment he picks up many of The Mother's belongings, attempting to show how compatible he and Cindy are (thinking the items are Cindy's) and glimpses the mother's foot as she disappears into her room after taking a shower. Ted finds out at this time that she plays bass guitar in a band. Ted forgets to take the yellow umbrella with him when he goes out and Future Ted mentions, "And your mom ... well, she got her yellow umbrella back." In "How Your Mother Met Me", it is revealed that after Ted left the apartment, the Mother had discovered the umbrella and, upon going to question Cindy, finds her crying. As the Mother tried to console her, Cindy kissed her, revealing that her jealousy towards her roommate was actually a crush. While this incident made Cindy realize that she was a lesbian, it also made the Mother decide to get back into dating, as the kiss was her first in a long time.

Some time after this, a man named Darren (Andrew Rannells) approaches the Mother and is welcomed into her band, Superfreakonomics. Darren gradually takes over the band, and becomes her nemesis.

In the season 6 opener "Big Days" it is revealed Ted meets his future wife "the day of" the wedding at which he is the best man. In the episode "False Positive" Robin asks Ted to be her future best man, should she ever get married. In the episode "Challenge Accepted", it is revealed that Ted meets the mother of his children the day of Barney's wedding. In the last episode of season 7, "The Magician's Code" it is shown that Barney will marry Robin, and Ted will meet the Mother the day of their wedding. In the premiere of season 8, Ted's wife appears after Barney and Robin's wedding, outside at the "Farhampton" station while holding a yellow umbrella and her bass guitar, though her face is not seen.

In the season 8 episode "Band or DJ?", Ted runs into Cindy and her partner on the subway and tells them that the band Barney and Robin hired to play at their wedding cancelled at the last minute. The end result of the encounter is that Cindy's (now ex-) roommate's band plays at Barney and Robin's wedding.

The Mother is first shown meeting Louis (Louis Ferrigno Jr.) in "How Your Mother Met Me" as she is left to carry the band equipment while the now-lead band member Darren talks to his fans. Later at MacLaren's Pub, she tells him she is not yet ready to date. Louis asks her to give him a call if she changes her mind, and they begin dating not long after. They live together for the next two years, but she knows deep down that she does not love him.

The Mother meets all of Ted's best friends—Barney, Robin, Lily Aldrin (Alyson Hannigan), and Marshall Eriksen (Jason Segel)—before she meets him. The Mother is responsible for convincing Barney to pursue Robin, as revealed through a flashback in "Platonish". In "The Locket", Tracy meets Lily on a train journey.

In "Bass Player Wanted", the Mother picks up a hitchhiking Marshall, carrying his infant son Marvin, on her way to Farhampton Inn. On their way, it is revealed that the Mother is the bass player in the band that is scheduled to play at the wedding reception, but Darren forced her to quit. The Mother ultimately decides to confront Darren and retake control of the band. Before she can, however, Darren walks up to her, furious the groom's best man punched him "for no reason", and quits the band.

In "How Your Mother Met Me", it is shown that after this incident, the Mother returns to Louis' summer cottage not far from where she had been staying for the duration of the wedding weekend. As she walks in the door, Louis proposes to her, but she goes outside to think about it for a few minutes. She looks skyward and asks Max for permission to let him go and move on; she takes a sudden gust of wind as a "yes", says goodbye, and declines Louis' proposal when she goes back inside. She leaves his cottage and checks in at Farhampton Inn. On her room's balcony, she plays the ukulele and sings "La Vie en Rose". Ted hears her singing from his room next door.

In "Gary Blauman", Ted and the Mother are on their first date. Ted picks her up at her New York City apartment and they proceed to walk to a Scottish-Mexican fusion restaurant for dinner. On the way there, Ted is telling her a story when they nearly have a run-in with Louis. She says that she is in the "weirdest place on earth" right now and that it is too soon for her to be dating. Ted walks her back to her apartment. They say goodnight and Ted begins to walk away. The Mother then stops him and asks him to finish the story he was telling her. When the story is over, they say goodnight again. The Mother takes a step towards Ted and they kiss for the first time, before deciding to carry on their date.

In a flashforward in "The Lighthouse", Ted proposes to the Mother at the top of the lighthouse near Farhampton Inn. She immediately accepts. In another flashfoward in "Unpause", the Mother is revealed to be pregnant with their second child, Luke, in the year 2017. She goes into labor while she and Ted are staying at Farhampton.

=== Name ===
The Mother's real name—Tracy McConnell—is not confirmed until the series finale, "Last Forever", when Ted meets her at the Farhampton train station. The name was hinted at in the season 1 episode "Belly Full of Turkey": Ted meets a stripper named Tracy and says "...that, kids, is the true story of how I met your mother". The children are horrified, but then he says he is joking, which led some fans to correctly guess that the Mother's name is Tracy.

== Fate ==
In the series finale, it is revealed that six years prior to Ted telling the story to his children, Tracy died in 2024 from an undisclosed illness. In the finale, the characters do not directly state that the Mother is dead. Ted says that she "became sick" and his children said that she has been "gone" for six years. Many fans expressed considerable disappointment with the Mother's death. Milioti cried when she learned her character was supposed to die, but came to accept the ending was what the writers had planned from the beginning. Bill Kuchman from Popculturology said that the Mother was "an amazing character" and that "over the course of this final season HIMYM made us care about Tracy". Kuchman said that "asking fans to drop all of that with a simple line about The Mother getting sick and passing away was a very difficult request", that the finale "advanced too quickly" and that "HIMYM was a victim of its own success on this issue".

A petition was started, aiming to rewrite and reshoot the finale. The petition had over 20,000 signatures and considerable online news coverage. On April 5, 2014, Carter Bays announced on Twitter that an alternate ending would be included on the season 9 DVD. No new material was shot for this scene. In the alternate ending, The Mother is still living when Ted is telling the story in 2030. Future Ted is heard saying, "...When I think how lucky I am to wake up next to your mom every morning, I can't help but be amazed how easy it all really was...", indirectly stating that The Mother is alive. The video ends right after the train passes at Farhampton station and credits start rolling, implying that Ted never went back to Robin and went on to have a long, happy marriage with Tracy.
