= Twin Beds (How I Met Your Mother) =

- How I Met Your Mother episode
- Episode no.: Season 5 Episode 21
- Directed by: Pamela Fryman
- Written by: Theresa Mulligan Rosenthal
- Production code: 5ALH19
- Original air date: May 3, 2010

Guest appearance
- Ben Koldyke as Don

Episode chronology
← Previous "Home Wreckers"	Next → "Robots Versus Wrestlers"
- How I Met Your Mother season 5

"Twin Beds" is the 21st episode of the fifth season of the CBS sitcom How I Met Your Mother and 109th episode overall. It aired May 3, 2010.

== Plot ==
Although Robin and Don have only been dating a short while, he surprises her by suggesting she move in with him. The rest of the gang think it might be too soon, so she agrees to let them meet Don, which she had specifically avoided before. They enjoy his company, but it soon becomes clear Don does not know that both Ted and Barney had once dated Robin. Don eventually finds out from Barney and Lily about the past relationships and, unable to comprehend that Robin continues to hang out with two of her exes, leaves the bar. Don apologizes the next day and offers to invite them over for dinner.

Once he and Robin have left, Barney reveals to Ted he still wants Robin. Ted tries to convince him he does not, and shows him the "letter"; Ted explains that every time he broke up with someone, he would write a letter to convince himself why he should not get back with the girl in the future. Ted had Barney write such a letter after breaking up with Robin, although it becomes clear after reading it that Barney still misses her. He proceeds to misbehave during dinner, bemusing Robin and Don. Ted reads his own letter; after he mentions Robin's then-fear of commitment, he realizes he too misses her. He and Barney end up arguing about who should get to be with Robin, becoming very drunk. They wind up crashing Don's place, much to Robin's embarrassment, especially as Ted has re-stolen the blue French horn for her.

The next day, a hungover Ted and Barney apologize, but Robin reveals she wants to take a break from the group and has agreed to move in with Don. Several days go by with no word from Robin or evidence that she has moved out, but one day Ted checks her room and finds it empty; all that has been left behind is the blue French horn.

Meanwhile, after spending a weekend sleeping in separate beds at a hotel, Marshall and Lily realize they both enjoy their personal space and get separate beds for their own room; they even plan to get a third bed just for sex. After going to Don's place for dinner, however, Lily begins to fear sleeping apart could ruin their marriage; especially as Don reveals he and his ex-wife slept in separate beds before divorcing. Marshall is not keen on giving up his own bed, but after having sex, he ends up climbing into Lily's bed with her.

== Critical response ==
Donna Bowman of The A.V. Club rated the episode grade B−.

Amanda Sloane Murray of IGN gave the episode 8.2 out of 10.

Cindy McLennan of Television Without Pity gave the episode a B− rating.

Alan Sepinwall of Uproxx compared it to The King of Queens episode "Bed Spread", which he said was even more funny.
