= Duel Citizenship =

- How I Met Your Mother episode
- Episode no.: Season 5 Episode 5
- Directed by: Pamela Fryman
- Written by: Chuck Tatham
- Production code: 5ALH05
- Original air date: October 19, 2009

Guest appearance
- Kenny Rogers as Kindly Book Narrator

Episode chronology
← Previous "The Sexless Innkeeper"	Next → "Bagpipes"
- How I Met Your Mother season 5

"Duel Citizenship" is the fifth episode of the fifth season of the CBS situation comedy How I Met Your Mother and 93rd overall. It originally aired on October 19, 2009.

== Plot ==
Future Ted explains that Robin's Canadian quirks and mannerisms were strange, which got her into trouble in the fall of 2009. After a bar fight, she is charged with assault and could be deported unless she gets American citizenship. Barney encourages her to take the citizenship test and teaches her to be obnoxious, arrogant and willfully ignorant—the hallmarks of a true American. Robin walks past her Canadian bar and goes in. After some serious drinking with Canada's national women's curling team, she blacks out and ends up in a Toronto hotel room.

Barney tracks her down and convinces her to take the test. They stop at a Tim Hortons, where the cashier mistakes her for an American. Barney makes a speech ridiculing Canadians for letting such an amazing woman go and then is beat up. After some free Canadian health care, they return home and Robin decides she wants dual citizenship.

Ted hears Gazola's pizzeria in Chicago is closing down. He and Marshall used to drive straight from Wesleyan to the pizzeria while in college, even though the pizza was awful. The road trips cemented their friendship, and Ted proposes they take one last trip. Pumped to spend some personal time with Marshall, Ted is disappointed that Lily is coming along.

Lily needs bathroom breaks frequently and insists they listen to an audiobook parodying Marley & Me. Ted is annoyed when they stop at a bed and breakfast instead of driving through the night. After Lily and Marshall engage in some couples' activities, Ted tricks Marshall into driving with him to Gazola's in his bathrobe. They enjoy the pizza, but Marshall feels guilty over abandoning Lily, and they leave. Ted admits that he is angry that Lily tagged along, and the two stop speaking.

They drive back to the bed and breakfast not speaking to each other, but the audio-book story they are listening to makes them realize they need each other's friendship, and they reconcile. Lily hasn't even noticed that they're gone because she has been powerfully sedated by the hotel's spa services. After some severe stomach pains from the pizza, the three head back to New York.

== Critical response ==
Donna Bowman of The A.V. Club rated the episode with a grade of A−.

Brian Zoromski of IGN gave the episode 9.5 out of 10.

Vlada Gelman writes about the Canadian jokes in the show and expresses a strong appreciation for the attention to detail and continuity the episode shows.
