= Rabbit or Duck =

- How I Met Your Mother episode
- Episode no.: Season 5 Episode 15
- Directed by: Pamela Fryman
- Written by: Carter Bays; Craig Thomas
- Production code: 5ALH15
- Original air date: February 8, 2010

Guest appearances
- Lauren Shiohama as Marissa; Arnold Chun as Waiter; Phil Simms as himself; Jim Nantz as himself; Bar Paly as Natalia

Episode chronology
← Previous "Perfect Week"	Next → "Hooked"
- How I Met Your Mother season 5

"Rabbit or Duck" is the 15th episode of the fifth season of the CBS sitcom How I Met Your Mother and 103rd episode overall. It originally aired on February 8, 2010. In a nod to CBS hosting that year's Super Bowl, the episode features NFL commentators Jim Nantz and Phil Simms in guest appearances as themselves.

== Plot ==
Ted, Marshall, Lily, and Robin hang out at Ted's apartment to watch Super Bowl XLIV, where the camera catches Barney holding up a sign in the crowd asking women to call him. It pays off as his phone keeps ringing with women on the other end. He hires Ranjit as his personal driver. Robin also reveals that, while they were on the air, she accepted an offer from her colleague, Don (Ben Koldyke), to go on a Valentine's Day date. The gang debates whether Robin is attracted to Don using the rabbit–duck illusion. This leads to an intense fight among the group, with Marshall supporting rabbits as an object of desire, and Ted, Robin, Lily and Ranjit supporting ducks. Marshall eventually concedes the point.

Given the success of Ranjit's arranged marriage, Ted decides to let Marshall and Lily pick his Valentine's Day date, claiming that he will marry the date if he likes her. Ted joins Robin at Don's apartment, as Don said there would be a party. Ted leaves when he sees Don on the couch naked, attempting The Naked Man. Robin confronts Don and he admits he is interested in her but didn't know how to say. However, she sees him with a large pair of rabbit ears.

Meanwhile, Barney has problems with his pickup phone. When he is about to bed one woman, another calls. This causes him to ditch the woman and have Ranjit drive him back to MacLaren's on three separate occasions. On the fourth incident, involving a woman named Natalia, Barney throws the phone in the dumpster so he can concentrate on her, but he continues to hear the phone ringing in the distance (in the manner of Poe's The Tell-Tale Heart) and goes to retrieve it. Marshall and Lily hide the phone, and later Ted finds it and answers.

Marshall and Lily, having forgotten to find Ted a date, frantically proposition various women in the bar. They ultimately settle on a "phone girl" after acquiring Barney's phone. Ted goes on the double date with Marshall and Lily, who have fixed him up with Natalia (Bar Paly). Despite their compatibility, Ted continues to answer the phone, which results in another encounter at MacLaren's. Barney tries to take the phone from Ted, but Ted passes it to Marshall and Lily, who drops the phone in a pitcher of beer.

While Robin prepares for her show, Don apologizes for his behavior and praises her anchor skills. He also tries to improve his work ethic by bringing Robin coffee. She later imagines a duck bill on his face.

== Critical response ==
Donna Bowman of The A.V. Club rated the episode with a grade A, while Cindy McLennan of Television Without Pity gave it a C+.

Brian Zoromski of IGN gave the episode 9 out of 10.

TV Fanatic gave the episode 4 out of 5 stars, praising the dialogue, while Time praised Neil Patrick Harris's acting.

Alan Sepinwall and The Star-Ledger described it as "a bizarre but ultimately funny episode of HIMYM."
