= How I Met Your Mother season 5 =

How I Met Your Mother
- Season 5
- The Complete Season 5. The Suited-Up Edition
- Starring: Josh Radnor; Jason Segel; Cobie Smulders; Neil Patrick Harris; Alyson Hannigan
- No. of episodes: 24

Release
- Original network: CBS
- Original release: September 21, 2009 – May 24, 2010

Season chronology
- ← Previous; Season 4 Next → Season 6

The fifth season of the American television comedy series How I Met Your Mother premiered on September 21, 2009, and concluded on May 24, 2010. It consists of 24 episodes, each running approximately 22 minutes in length. CBS broadcast the fifth season on Monday nights at 8:00 pm in the United States.

== Cast ==
=== Main cast ===
- Josh Radnor as Ted Mosby
- Jason Segel as Marshall Eriksen
- Cobie Smulders as Robin Scherbatsky
- Neil Patrick Harris as Barney Stinson
- Alyson Hannigan as Lily Aldrin
- Bob Saget (uncredited) as Future Ted Mosby (voice only)

=== Recurring cast ===
- Lyndsy Fonseca as Penny, Ted's Daughter
- David Henrie as Luke, Ted's Son
- Marshall Manesh as Ranjit
- Joe Nieves as Carl, the owner of MacLarens Pub
- Charlene Amoia as Wendy the Waitress
- Cristine Rose as Virginia Mosby
- Ben Koldyke as Don Frank
- Chris Elliott as Mickey Aldrin

=== Guest cast ===
- Joe Manganiello as Brad Morris
- Tim Gunn as TV's Tim Gunn (Barney's personal tailor)
- Lindsay Sloane as Jen
- Rachel Bilson as Cindy
- JoAnna Garcia as Maggie
- Jennifer Lopez as Anita Appleby
- Stacy Keibler as Karina (Hot Bartender)
- Alan Thicke as himself
- Amanda Peet as Jenkins
- Laura Prepon as Karen
- Nick Swisher as himself
- Carrie Underwood as Tiffany
- Malin Åkerman as Movie Stella
- Chris Kattan as Jed Mosely
- Judy Greer as Royce
- Peter Bogdanovich as himself
- Hong Chau as Cook Pu
- Charles Chun as Mr. Park
- Sarah Wright as Claire
- Phillip Wilburn as Joe
- Jim Nantz as himself

== Episodes ==
Season five episodes
No. overall	No. in season	Title	Directed by	Written by	Original release date	Prod. code	US viewers (millions)
89	1	"Definitions"	Pamela Fryman	Carter Bays & Craig Thomas	September 21, 2009	5ALH01	9.09
When the gang finds out that Barney and Robin are hesitant to define their relationship, Lily forces them to confront their biggest fear... becoming boyfriend/girlfriend. Meanwhile, Ted is anxious about teaching his first lecture.
90	2	"Double Date"	Pamela Fryman	Matt Kuhn	September 28, 2009	5ALH02	8.71
Ted discovers he had been fixed up with the same woman, seven years earlier. The rest of the gang goes to the Lusty Leopard strip club and see a dancer who looks like Lily.
91	3	"Robin 101"	Pamela Fryman	Carter Bays & Craig Thomas	October 5, 2009	5ALH03	8.08
When Robin fears that Barney is cheating on her, she soon discovers that he is spending his evenings with Ted learning everything there is to know on how to date her. Marshall gives away a prized possession.
92	4	"The Sexless Innkeeper"	Pamela Fryman	Kourtney Kang	October 12, 2009	5ALH04	8.56
Marshall and Lily desperately try to have a double date with Barney and Robin. A girl falls asleep at Ted's apartment after meeting him at the bar, making him the "Sexless Innkeeper".
93	5	"Duel Citizenship"	Pamela Fryman	Chuck Tatham	October 19, 2009	5ALH05	8.07
Ted proposes a road trip with Marshall to their favorite pizza parlor in Chicago to reminisce their bachelor days, but Lily comes on the trip, spoiling the 'bro' time. Barney is seeking American citizenship for Robin, but her Canadian traits still remain.
94	6	"Bagpipes"	Pamela Fryman	Robia Rashid	November 2, 2009	5ALH06	8.82
Barney, thinking he and Robin are the perfect couple, gives relationship advice to Marshall, which turns out to be a big mistake. Ted and Robin have some noisy neighbours.
95	7	"The Rough Patch"	Pamela Fryman	Chris Harris	November 9, 2009	5ALH07	8.67
Ted and Marshall decide to break Barney and Robin up for good after they hit a rough patch in their relationship. When their plan fails, they turn to Lily and she enlists some things to break them up, including Alan Thicke.
96	8	"The Playbook"	Pamela Fryman	Carter Bays & Craig Thomas	November 16, 2009	5ALH08	8.16
Barney pulls out all of his greatest tricks to reenter the dating scene after he and Robin break up with the use of the Playbook.
97	9	"Slapsgiving 2: Revenge of the Slap"	Pamela Fryman	Jamie Rhonheimer	November 23, 2009	5ALH09	8.75
The gang celebrates Thanksgiving this year with Lily's estranged father (Chris Elliott) whom she hadn't spoken to in three years. Ted and Robin are given the chance to use Marshall's fourth Slap Bet slap on Barney.
98	10	"The Window"	Pamela Fryman	Joe Kelly	December 7, 2009	5ALH11	8.79
Maggie (JoAnna Garcia), a girl next door that Ted has wanted to date for years, has suddenly broken up with her latest boyfriend, giving him and other guys a chance to score with her.
99	11	"Last Cigarette Ever"	Pamela Fryman	Theresa Mulligan Rosenthal	December 14, 2009	5ALH10	9.65
After quitting cold turkey, Marshall takes up smoking again, with Lily, Ted, Robin and Barney not far behind.
100	12	"Girls vs. Suits"	Pamela Fryman	Carter Bays & Craig Thomas	January 11, 2010	5ALH12	9.78
Ted meets Cindy (Rachel Bilson), a student (PhD candidate) who is close to his own age and who happens to be roommates with his future wife. Barney, meanwhile, tries to pick up a hot bartender (Stacy Keibler) who hates guys in suits by wearing casual clothes leading to a musical number performed by the entire cast.
101	13	"Jenkins"	Neil Patrick Harris	Greg Malins	January 18, 2010	5ALH13	10.41
Marshall finds himself in a quandary as Lily refuses to believe that one of his female colleagues (Amanda Peet) kissed him.
102	14	"Perfect Week"	Pamela Fryman	Craig Gerard & Matthew Zinman	February 1, 2010	5ALH14	9.28
Barney aims to achieve the perfect week: seven days, seven hook-ups, zero rejections, but a sudden accident changes his way of life.
103	15	"Rabbit or Duck"	Pamela Fryman	Carter Bays & Craig Thomas	February 8, 2010	5ALH15	10.00
Ted abdicates responsibility for finding a Valentine's Day date, and allows Lily and Marshall to "arrange" a date for him; Robin foolishly consents to attend a Valentine's day party given by her deeply inappropriate co-worker, Don Frank. Barney has a 'magic' phone but can't stop answering it.
104	16	"Hooked"	Pamela Fryman	Kourtney Kang	March 1, 2010	5ALH16	10.37
When a beautiful young woman "hooks" Ted (keeping Ted in reserve as backup while she pursues her own dream boyfriend), the gang discusses their own experiences both as the one who "hooks" and the one on the hook. Guest starring Carrie Underwood as "Tiffany".
105	17	"Of Course"	Pamela Fryman	Matt Kuhn	March 8, 2010	5ALH18	10.06
Robin is looking to get back at Barney for being insensitive to her after they broke up, hiring self-help author Anita (Jennifer Lopez) to help her out.
106	18	"Say Cheese"	Pamela Fryman	Robia Rashid	March 22, 2010	5ALH17	8.37
It is Lily's 32nd birthday, that Marshall has carefully planned. Ted has to ruin it all by bringing a stranger to the intimate celebration, an incident that causes Lily to drag out the photo albums and review the endless parade of short-timers in Ted's romantic life. Robin tries to catch Barney in a bad position to take a photograph.
107	19	"Zoo or False"	Pamela Fryman	Stephen Lloyd	April 12, 2010	5ALH22	6.80
Marshall gets mugged which leads Lily to think getting a gun is the answer to keeping them safe. Marshall tries to come up with ways to stop her.
108	20	"Home Wreckers"	Pamela Fryman	Chris Harris	April 19, 2010	5ALH20	7.71
Ted impulsively buys a dilapidated house after his mother's wedding.
109	21	"Twin Beds"	Pamela Fryman	Theresa Mulligan Rosenthal	May 3, 2010	5ALH19	7.70
Both Ted and Barney jeopardize Robin's new relationship by professing their love for her. Meanwhile, after spending a weekend sleeping in twin beds, Marshall and Lily decide to get twin beds at home.
110	22	"Robots vs. Wrestlers"	Rob Greenberg	Jamie Rhonheimer	May 10, 2010	5ALH21	8.10
Crashing a snobby high-society party allows Ted to show off how pretentiously intellectual he can be. Barney, Marshall, and Lily visit a Robots Vs Wrestlers event. Marshall and Lily make a secret pact to start trying to have a baby if they ever finally see Barney's doppelgänger.
111	23	"The Wedding Bride"	Pamela Fryman	Stephen Lloyd	May 17, 2010	5ALH24	7.63
Ted takes a date, Royce (Judy Greer), to see a new hit movie, The Wedding Bride. However, he recognizes its plot as similar to his relationship with Stella, especially since her fiance, Tony, wrote the screenplay.
112	24	"Doppelgangers"	Pamela Fryman	Carter Bays & Craig Thomas	May 24, 2010	5ALH23	8.06
Lily and Marshall make some hard choices upon seeing Barney's doppelganger. Robin finally gets an offer for her dream job but someone else would end up with it.

== Reception ==
Reviews for season 5 of How I Met Your Mother were mixed.

Cindy McLennan of Television Without Pity gave the season a negative review, and at the end of the season wrote: "I'm okay with any given season not being primarily focused on mother-meeting, but this season, the characters seemed to regress -- particularly Barney and Ted. Usually, when a season ends, I have to deal with a week or two weeks' worth of letdown. Right now, all I'm feeling is relief."

On the other hand, Amanda Sloane Murray from IGN gave the season a lukewarm review saying "So maybe this season didn't have the funniest jokes or the freshest material to work with. On the whole, it's not one that's going to stand out in our minds as one of the best seasons in the How I Met Your Mother canon; most of us are eager to forget Robin and Barney ever happened, Robin's co-anchor Don was switched up from funny guy to boring straight man and eventually discarded; nobody made significant strides in their career or their love life. Yet at the end of the day, a few loose ends suggest tantalizing possibilities for next season: Ted is now in possession of a house, while Marshall and Lily have decided to get pregnant. Our group is back together, unfettered by relationships inside or outside the inner circle, and we're happy to have it that way."
