= Robin 101 =

- How I Met Your Mother episode
- Episode no.: Season 5 Episode 3
- Directed by: Pamela Fryman
- Written by: Carter Bays; Craig Thomas
- Production code: 5ALH03
- Original air date: October 5, 2009

Guest appearances
- Christine Tonnu as Sandy; Heather Nichols as Mandy; Sophie Simpson as College Girl; Olga Fonda as Candy; Kazu Nagahama as Shin-Ya

Episode chronology
← Previous "Double Date"	Next → "The Sexless Innkeeper"
- How I Met Your Mother season 5

"Robin 101" is the third episode of the fifth season of the How I Met Your Mother TV series and 91st overall. It originally aired on October 5, 2009.

== Plot ==
Robin and Barney are officially girlfriend and boyfriend, but Barney is having trouble adjusting to couple life. He sneaks out of bed after sex as if it was a one-night stand, and when Robin has an awful day, he avoids consoling her, telling her to meet him afterwards for sex. After Robin protests, Ted criticizes Barney for his behavior and tells him that if he does not improve, their relationship will not last.

Barney makes more of an effort to be a better boyfriend to Robin. When he begins acting evasively, Robin fears that he is cheating on her. She tells Lily who tells her that she is overreacting. Robin then breaks into Barney's briefcase and finds a notebook full of notes about her, although she initially thought that Barney was cheating on her with a college girl. Barney is actually taking night classes from Ted: "Robin 101: How to date Robin Scherbatsky".

Marshall decides to get rid of a barrel he named Mabel that he used for years as a nightstand. He was saddened when he had to get rid of it due to Lily's "barrel resin allergy". He puts it in "The Bermuda Triangle", otherwise known as the front step, and he waits anxiously by the window with his binoculars waiting to see who will take the barrel. So far, there are no takers.

In "Robin 101", Ted teaches Barney which topics will distract Robin from being angry, which include hockey, guns and emperor penguins. He also teaches Barney about Robin's expressions and things to never do around her. At first, Barney plays the part of the distracted and bored student, but after Ted tests the knowledge he has given him, Barney asks him to stay. Unfortunately, Ted's successful classes with Barney are interrupted when Robin finds out about the lessons and shows up for class. Robin gets angry, accusing Ted of not knowing her at all, and storms out.

Ted stops by MacLaren's to talk to Robin, and he convinces Robin to give Barney another chance. Ted mentions how Barney usually tries to get rid of women after one night, but was amazed to find him try hard to keep Robin around. Robin finds Barney, who gives up his "Robin notebook", and apologizes to her, admitting that he was scared that she would break up with him. She forgives him and as they kiss, she reminds him that the notebook contains a lot of personal information, but the notebook mysteriously vanishes before they can reclaim it, and Marshall is upset because his barrel has still not been claimed.

== Critical response ==
Donna Bowman of The A.V. Club rated the episode with a grade A−.

Brian Zoromski of IGN gave the episode 8 out of 10.
