= Last Cigarette Ever =

- How I Met Your Mother episode
- Episode no.: Season 5 Episode 11
- Directed by: Pamela Fryman
- Written by: Theresa Mulligan Rosenthal
- Production code: 5ALH10
- Original air date: December 14, 2009

Guest appearances
- Harvey Fierstein as Lily's smoking voice; Ron Nicolosi as Mike; Ben Koldyke as Don; Tyler Peterson as 13-year-old Marshall; Trent Peltz as Ricky; Bob Odenkirk as Arthur Hobbs

Episode chronology
← Previous "The Window"	Next → "Girls Versus Suits"
- How I Met Your Mother season 5

"Last Cigarette Ever" is the 11th episode of the fifth season of the CBS situation comedy How I Met Your Mother and 99th episode overall. It aired on December 14, 2009.

== Plot ==
A frustrated Robin takes a smoke break up on the roof and is joined by Marshall, who is stressed about his new department head Arthur Hobbs. Lily smells the smoke on Marshall and soon uses it as an excuse to start smoking again herself. Ted and Barney feel left out as their friends smoke outside MacLaren's, and they join in as well. As the week continues, their smoking takes its toll and they all pledge to stop smoking.

Meanwhile, Robin is joined by a new co-anchor, Don Frank, a legend of the pre-6am television world, having been broadcast in 38 media outlets. Robin is impressed at first, but Don's lack of professionalism and total indifference to his job drive her to start smoking also.

The gang agrees to have "one last cigarette" as the sun rises, but Future Ted reveals it took years for each member of the gang to actually quit.

== Production ==
Due to Bob Odenkirk's appearance as Arthur Hobbs in this episode, he was unavailable to appear as Saul Goodman in the Season 2 finale of Breaking Bad. Consequently, the character of Mike Ehrmantraut was created to fill a similar role and was ultimately promoted to the main cast of Breaking Bad and eventually Better Call Saul.

== Critical response ==
Donna Bowman of The A.V. Club rated the episode with a grade A−.

Joel Keller, reviewer at TV Squad, described the casting of Harvey Fierstein as Lily's smoking voice as only the third funniest thing in the episode. He praises the flashback scenes to 13-year-old Marshall's first smoke as the funniest thing in the episode.

Brian Zoromski of IGN gave the episode only 5.5 out of 10. Zoromski noted that he had never been a smoker and described this as the worst episode ever.

TV Critic gave it 52 out of 100, commenting on the episode's humor: "These jokes wouldn't happen in real life and so each time one appears it induces a groan rather than a laugh."
