= Perfect Week =

- How I Met Your Mother episode
- Episode no.: Season 5 Episode 14
- Directed by: Pamela Fryman
- Written by: Craig Gerard, Matthew Zinman
- Production code: 5ALH14
- Original air date: February 1, 2010

Guest appearances
- Larry Poindexter as Joe Donovan; Hong Chau as Cook Pu; George Finn as Jamie Adamic; Ryan Dobson as Danny; Jessica Faye Borden as Joanna; Brooke Newton as Christy; Nick Swisher as Himself; Jim Nantz as Himself; Charlene Lovings as Assistant

Episode chronology
← Previous "Jenkins"	Next → "Rabbit or Duck"
- How I Met Your Mother season 5

"Perfect Week" is the 14th episode of the fifth season of the CBS situation comedy How I Met Your Mother and 102nd episode overall. It originally aired on February 1, 2010.

== Plot ==
Barney decides to attempt a "perfect week", defined as having sex with seven women in seven days without a single rejection. On the fifth night, Marshall informs Barney he thought Barney might get fired on Friday. Barney asks Ted for help finding the dumbest girl in the bar, whom Barney promptly takes home.

On the sixth night, Lily utters the phrase "perfect week", jinxing Barney. The next night, Lily is so confident that Barney will succeed in seducing Christy at the bar, she says "there's no such thing as a jinx." Then Nick Swisher, a member of the 2009 World Champion New York Yankees, walks through the door.

Lily realizes they all need Barney's perfect week to make them feel better. With the helps of his friends, Barney completes his tryst with Christy. Barney is called into the office and his boss says he will be keeping his job. Back at the bar, the gang commemorates Barney's week by retiring the tie he wore on the seventh day.

== Critical response ==
Donna Bowman of The A.V. Club rated the episode with a grade A−.

Brian Zoromski of IGN gave the episode 8.7 out of 10.
