= The Sexless Innkeeper =

- How I Met Your Mother episode
- Episode no.: Season 5 Episode 4
- Directed by: Pamela Fryman
- Written by: Kourtney Kang
- Production code: 5ALH04
- Original air date: October 12, 2009

Guest appearances
- Julianna Guill as Maiden, busty Girl-Ted sequence; Marshall Manesh as Ranjit; K.T. Tatara as Py; Sarah Edward as Suzy; Trey Ellett as Paul; Nikea Gamby-turner as Hostess

Episode chronology
← Previous "Robin 101"	Next → "Duel Citizenship"
- How I Met Your Mother season 5

"The Sexless Innkeeper" is the fourth episode of the fifth season of the CBS situation comedy How I Met Your Mother and 92nd overall. It originally aired on October 12, 2009.

== Plot ==
Lily and Marshall are excited to have another couple to hang out with. Future Ted explains that they had fared poorly with previous couples, coming across as clingy and desperate. With Barney and Robin now a couple, they hope to turn their luck around. After an evening together, Lily and Marshall believe that it was "the best night ever", despite Robin and Barney being obviously bored and uncomfortable, with them complaining about how weird Marshall got about the cheese and how they would overreact when one little thing went wrong, including an egg timer breaking during a game of Charades. Robin and Barney ignore their messages and avoid Lily and Marshall, but they eventually admit that they do not want to be "couple friends". Devastated, Lily and Marshall blame each other for the failure, citing Marshall's bizarre photo montages of trivial events and Lily's tendency to plan big outings too quickly.

After a week apart from Lily and Marshall, Robin and Barney realize they miss their friends, and head over to their condo, only to find them enjoying the company of another couple. Barney and Robin are crushed by the rejection. They interrupt another couples' night at Lily and Marshall's apartment, leading them outside with a trail of egg timers. In the rain, Barney and Robin ask for another chance, which Marshall and Lily grant them, attracted by their rebellious mystique. They promise to never fight again, and share a hug.

Ted has settled into the persona of a professor, often wearing a tweed jacket. He claims it attracts the ladies, but after a woman leaves his apartment in the morning without having sex, Barney and Robin accuse him of being the "Sexless Innkeeper". Barney elaborates with a poem set in a Dickensian version of Queens, where he was caught in a blizzard, walked a few blocks to an ugly woman's apartment, and feigned sleep to avoid sex. Ted is annoyed at the new nickname and constantly tries to prove them wrong.

As Barney and Robin leave for brunch with Lily and Marshall, Ted recites a poem of his own for Barney, telling the tale of a busty young blonde woman who was turned on by his professor persona. Barney is skeptical, but is left speechless when the young woman appears at Ted's bedroom door, inviting Ted back to bed, thus ending the reign of the Sexless Innkeeper.

== Critical response ==
Donna Bowman of The A.V. Club rated the episode with a grade B.

Brian Zoromski of IGN gave the episode 6.8 out of 10. The review described the episode as "mostly unfunny"; he went on to say that he liked the premise of Marshall writing sentimental songs for mundane occasions, but that it was not part of a believable story.

== Trivia ==
- Marshall's hobby of making up fun songs has been shown in previous episodes such as "Sweet Taste of Liberty" and "Slapsgiving". This trait of Marshall was mentioned to be annoying by Robin in "Spoiler Alert".
- Besides "itwasthebestnightever.com" Marshall created other websites such as "slapcountdown.com" and "lilyandmarshallselltheirstuff.com".
- "The Platinum Rule" and "Definitions" have also explored the theme of Lily and Marshall wanting couple friends.
- The title of this episode is centred around having sex to have a place to stay for the night and was one of the 50 reasons Lily had written for having sex in "The Naked Man".
