= Jenkins (How I Met Your Mother) =

- How I Met Your Mother episode
- Episode no.: Season 5 Episode 13
- Directed by: Neil Patrick Harris
- Written by: Greg Malins
- Production code: 5ALH13
- Original air date: January 18, 2010

Guest appearances
- Amanda Peet as Real Jenkins; Edward Flores as Male Jenkins

Episode chronology
← Previous "Girls Versus Suits"	Next → "Perfect Week"
- How I Met Your Mother season 5

"Jenkins" is the 13th episode of the fifth season of the CBS situation comedy How I Met Your Mother and 101st episode overall. It originally aired on January 18, 2010. The episode hit a season high with 10.52 million viewers and high overall ratings.

The episode is directed by starring actor and first-time director Neil Patrick Harris.

== Plot ==
Ted and Marshall walk into a college bar, and Ted is worried about meeting his students there. Marshall goes to the bar often to maintain his skeeball high score. Marshall tells him that Jenkins, a particularly quirky co-worker who has been the subject of a number of funny office stories that Marshall has told the group about, will be joining them. Because Marshall neglected to mention Jenkins's gender, Ted pictures Jenkins as a goofy fat man, and is therefore taken by surprise when Barney announces his intention to sleep with Jenkins. He finally gets the resolution when Jenkins arrives and turns out to be a beautiful woman. Marshall begs Ted not to tell Lily, since he is afraid that she would be jealous when she finds out Jenkins' real gender, since some of the things that Jenkins had done were crazy (peeing out of a cab window, taking off her shirt as she dances on the table, etc).

The next day, Lily unexpectedly shows up at Marshall's workplace, and finds out that Jenkins is a woman. However, she is not jealous or upset that he neglected to tell her Jenkins' gender. Ted and Robin theorize that in every relationship, one person is a "reacher", and one is a "settler", who settles for the less attractive partner. Marshall at first is offended and says that he did not "settle for Lily", but is upset when he realizes that Ted and Robin define him as a reacher. Marshall later asks Lily to classify herself and she says that she is a "settler", upsetting him even more.

To prove that he can date more attractive women, Marshall plans to show Lily how Jenkins flirts with him. At his workplace, Jenkins kisses Marshall on impulse. Marshall runs home and apologizes to Lily, but she dismisses him as lying to make her jealous. Jenkins later apologizes to Marshall, saying she was drunk from a late-night drinking game. She plans to apologize to Lily, which Marshall eagerly urges her to do to prove to Lily that Jenkins really did kiss him. Lily calmly listens to Jenkins' apology, then proceeds to beat her up.

In a separate story, Robin encounters fans of her pre-morning news show. At the college bar, one of Ted's students compliments Robin for her work. The next day, she interrupts Ted's class to announce that she is the show's host. After she leaves, Ted complains about how boring the show is and asks why would his students know her. The class explains to Ted that Robin is so hesitant when she does interviews that her constant interjections of "but um" are the basis for a drinking game, one that Jenkins had been playing when she drunkenly kissed Marshall.

Ted and Barney test the game the next night, watching Robin's show, and get smashed. After Robin brags about her wide viewership, Ted explains the reason. That night, Ted joins his class for the game. Annoyed by the truth, Robin decides to repeat the phrase "but um" excessively, making those playing the game drink much more than usual.

During the next day's class, Robin interrupts again, startling the hungover Ted and his students by shouting into a megaphone.

== Production ==
Neil Patrick Harris made his directorial debut with the episode. This is especially unusual for the show, as Pamela Fryman directed the majority of the episodes before this. Of the previous 100 episodes, 94 were directed by Fryman, 5 were directed by Rob Greenberg and 1 was directed by Michael Shea, making Harris only the fourth different person to direct an episode of the show. Harris summarized the experience describing it as [sic] "Equal parts overwhelm, education, and exhilaration." Harris' role is smaller in this episode due to directorial duties.

== Critical response ==
"Jenkins" received generally positive reviews from critics, with praise directed toward its humour, guest performance, and Neil Patrick Harris's directorial debut.

Donna Bowman of The A.V. Club awarded the episode a B+, describing it as a representative example of the series’ fifth season and praising its streamlined structure, use of setting, and integration of character-driven storylines. Bowman highlighted the episode’s balance between the Marshall–Lily and Ted–Robin plots, noting the effective use of the college bar setting and the episode’s focus on relationship dynamics rather than high-concept spectacle.

Brian Zoromski of IGN gave the episode 8.5 out of 10, calling it an entertaining installment with well-executed twists and strong guest casting. He praised Amanda Peet’s performance as Jenkins, citing her chemistry with Jason Segel and describing her role as a refreshing departure from the show’s typical use of guest characters. Zoromski also commended the episode’s two central reveals—Jenkins’ gender and the reason for Robin’s popularity among college students—as particularly effective. However, he criticised the “reacher” and “settler” theory introduced in the episode, arguing that it felt unnecessary given the established dynamics of Marshall and Lily’s relationship.

Other reviewers echoed similar sentiments. TV Fanatic praised Peet’s guest appearance, while Amos Barshad of Vulture.com highlighted the episode’s humor and escalating misunderstandings. Murray Ferguson of Screen Rant described the episode as light and accessible, noting Neil Patrick Harris’s effective use of established How I Met Your Mother tropes in his directorial debut.
