= Girls Versus Suits =

- How I Met Your Mother episode
- Episode no.: Season 5 Episode 12
- Directed by: Pamela Fryman
- Written by: Carter Bays & Craig Thomas
- Production code: 5ALH12
- Original air date: January 11, 2010

Guest appearances
- Rachel Bilson as Cindy; Tim Gunn as himself; Stacy Keibler as Hot bartender, Karina

Episode chronology
← Previous "Last Cigarette Ever"	Next → "Jenkins"
- How I Met Your Mother season 5

"Girls Versus Suits" is the 12th episode of the fifth season of the American situation comedy television series How I Met Your Mother and the 100th episode overall. Written by series creators Carter Bays & Craig Thomas and directed by Pamela Fryman, the episode originally aired on CBS on January 11, 2010.

The episode features a fantasy musical number, "Nothing Suits Me Like a Suit", performed by Neil Patrick Harris, which was nominated for the Primetime Emmy Award for Outstanding Original Music and Lyrics.

== Plot ==
Future Ted tells the kids about the time he almost met their mother.

Leaving class, Ted confiscates alcohol in 2010 from fraternity brother and shares it with the woman they were propositioning, Cindy (Rachel Bilson), a Ph.D. student roughly Ted's age. He asks her out and learns that Cindy has serious issues with her roommate (whom Future Ted reveals to be the Mother) with whom her dates keep falling in love. Ted promises Cindy to never fall in love with her roommate ("Oops," says Future Ted). Throughout the date, Cindy complains about her roommate and her odd habits which Ted secretly thinks are awesome.

After the date, Cindy tells Ted she cannot see him again, not wanting to risk her scholarship or Ted's teaching career. However, Ted does not want to miss a chance at love and returns to Cindy's apartment to persuade her to go out again. Ted picks three items from the room to show how much they have in common, but it turns out they are all connected to her roommate. Frustrated that Ted is already more compatible with her roommate, Cindy tells him to go. Ted catches a glimpse of the roommate's leg as he leaves, and forgets to take the yellow umbrella he had brought with him which returns to the possession of the Mother.

Barney seeks to bed MacLaren's attractive new bartender (Stacy Keibler), but after dating insensitive Wall Street losers she does not like men in suits. For a while he dresses casually, convincing the bartender she misjudged him. However, Barney exhibits withdrawal, becoming overly affectionate of a suit Marshall wears, and sneaking to the bathroom to wear a suit. Barney accidentally rips the jacket which is damaged beyond repair, though his tailor, Tim Gunn, transplants the buttons to save another suit and Barney cremates the remains.

With the urn of suit ashes and his real tears for his lost suit, Barney convinces the bartender to go to his apartment, where she accidentally opens his suit closet. She forces him to choose between her and his suits, and Barney imagines himself breaking into song, professing his love of suits—only to choose her at the end of the song when he realizes "she is pretty hot." He tells her she is more important than the suits and they will go first thing in the morning. As they fall into bed, he whispers, "You guys are fine" to his suits, which move slightly as if breathing a sigh of relief.

Meanwhile, Lily, Marshall, and Robin argue about the bartender's attractiveness. An envious Robin suggests the location amplifies natural beauty, eventually snapping and getting behind the bar to prove her point but is soon kicked out. Marshall insists the bartender is not that attractive, saying Lily is the most beautiful woman he has ever met. Lily, clearly impressed by the bartender herself, tries to get Marshall to say she is not as beautiful as the bartender, and eventually even implies that the bartender is better looking than Marshall, upsetting him a little.

== Production ==
Executive producer and co-creator Craig Thomas revealed Neil Patrick Harris will be performing a "big-ass musical" number as the culmination of a big Barney story. Thomas has said: "There is some serious Mother action in episode 100", revealing only a small teaser about the episode. "Nothing Suits Me Like a Suit" was backed by sixty-five dancers and accompanied by a fifty-piece orchestra.

=== Casting ===
Rachel Bilson was cast for an undisclosed role in episode 100 of the show, although her representative said she is only contracted for one episode.

Tim Gunn of Project Runway brings his sartorial skills to help out Barney in a time of need. Craig Thomas explains: "Tim is basically like Barney's ER physician for a serious suit emergency", and serves as a personal tailor and fashion consultant to fix a "Suit Catastrophe" for Barney. Speaking to Entertainment Tonight, Neil Patrick Harris said that they "never had a guest star on the show that people responded to more than Tim Gunn" and that even the cast and crew were asking for his autograph. Alyson Hannigan described him as "more popular than Britney Spears." Although unofficial, on the Season 5 DVD commentary of the episode, it has been expressed that they hope to have Gunn return as a possible recurring character.

Former wrestling diva Stacy Keibler guest stars as Karina, a bartender in MacLaren's. The writers describe her as "the hottest bartender in the world" and she gives the episode its title, as she forces Barney to choose between his suits and getting the girl. Her three previous ex-boyfriends were all suit wearers, and Barney cannot get with her without giving up his suits.

== Reception ==
Donna Bowman of The A.V. Club rated the episode with a grade A, describing the 100th episode as one of the best the show has ever produced. She describes the episode as appealing to fans in a way that doesn't exclude other viewers, noting the quality of the writing and editing, the voiceover being used to great effect, and advancing the storyline for all the characters.

Brian Zoromski of IGN gave the episode 9.8 out of 10, and called the milestone episode "a giant thank you to the fans" with plot advancement on the Mother topped by a lavish musical production. "If anyone ever doubted whether the writers could believably pull off this meandering, long-winded story of how a father met his kids' future mother without dropping the pieces, this episode shows that the How I Met team has a strong grasp of how everything fits together."

Cindy McLennan of Television Without Pity rated the episode with a grade A.

Nickolas Clague of The New York Times gave the episode 9.2 out of 10.

Actor Neil Patrick Harris has stated that this is his favorite episode of How I Met Your Mother.
