= Double Date (How I Met Your Mother) =

- How I Met Your Mother episode
- Episode no.: Season 5 Episode 2
- Directed by: Pamela Fryman
- Written by: Matt Kuhn
- Production code: 5AlH02
- Original air date: September 28, 2009

Guest appearances
- Alyssa Smith as April; Lindsay Sloane as Jen; Clyde Tull as Minister Giles; Alyson Hannigan as Jasmine / Stripper Lily; Rizwan Manji as Dr. Vikash; Molly Prather as Judy

Episode chronology
← Previous "Definitions"	Next → "Robin 101"
- How I Met Your Mother season 5

"Double Date" is the second episode of the fifth season of the sitcom How I Met Your Mother, and the 90th episode overall. It originally aired on September 28, 2009.

== Plot ==
Future Ted describes a date he went on in 2009, and the screen quickly changes to show a side-by-side shot of him preparing in 2009 and 2002. It turns out that Ted is about to go on a blind date with Jen, a woman he went on another blind date with in 2002. After going to exactly the same restaurant and exchanging the same dialogue, including a pun about shellfish that Jen describes as "really bad", Ted and Jen realize they are repeating their blind date from seven years ago. They remember that the date was horrible, from Ted's snobbish behavior to Jen's obsession with her cats and her ex-boyfriend. Frightened by the prospect of having to date everyone in New York City again, they decide to retrace their steps to find the mistakes of the first date.

Learning new things about themselves on the first date, Ted and Jen head to MacLaren's, where the gang is there to help them retrace the events of the 2002 date. Jen reveals that she thought Ted was checking out a woman at the bar, when Ted and Barney were really looking at "Mustache Marshall". Ted and Jen head up to the roof, and after they share a kiss they suddenly realize why they never had another date: Ted never called her. Ted apologizes for his blunder and gives a version of what might have happened had they gotten together. Before Ted and Jen can kiss again on the roof, he stops and realizes that their quirks are part of who they are and that they should hold out for someone who will not just tolerate them, but like them. Future Ted then tells his kids that when he told the shellfish pun to their mother, she laughed (almost completely sincerely).

Meanwhile, the rest of the gang grapples with relationship questions. Though Barney claims to have tickets to an origin of Chewbacca exhibit, which Marshall is genuinely excited about, they instead head to the Lusty Leopard strip bar, where Marshall is uncomfortable because he considers fantasies cheating. He explains to Barney that every time he wants to fantasize, he must create an elaborate scenario where Lily must die of a terminal illness. While they discuss this, Jasmine (Alyson Hannigan) — a stripper who looks exactly like Lily — appears on stage, exciting Barney to no end. He and Marshall return to MacLaren's and tell Robin and Lily about Lily's doppelgänger. It is also revealed that the gang has seen two other doppelgängers; a butch "Lesbian Robin", and "Mustache Marshall", Hispanic lawyer Señor Justicia. Lily is excited about the find, but Robin gets mad about Barney going to a strip club.

Barney makes Marshall tell Lily about his death fantasies that he uses to justify thinking about other women. Lily tells Marshall she is fine with him thinking about other women, at least as long as she is alive in the fantasy. Lily takes Marshall back to the strip club to fantasize about her doppelgänger to get over his discomfort, and is so enthralled by her stripper twin that she and Marshall get a private dance. Barney and Robin go too, where everyone recognizes him, stoking Robin's anger. She tells Barney how uncomfortable the thought of him going to a strip club makes her and wants to have a serious talk about their relationship, but Barney remains oblivious.

In the tag scene, Marshall comments to Lily that Jasmine is having trouble on stage. When "Lily" responds with a thick accent, a rather sullen tone and a cigarette in hand, "Jasmine" falls on stage and, realising that Lily has traded places with Jasmine and is now onstage, leaps up to help her.

== Production ==
True story: I heard this song ["Rewind" by Goldspot] in my head while reading the script for this episode. It was a weird moment of kismet. Its bittersweet poignancy was the perfect tone to play in an episode about missed opportunities, second chances and bad timing.

— Andy Gowan, How I Met Your Mother music supervisor

The episode was originally planned for season 4 but was shelved due to the complicated dual timeline. At the time the show had not yet been renewed for a fifth season.

== Critical response ==
Donna Bowman of The A.V. Club rated the episode with a grade A−.

Brian Zoromski of IGN gave the episode 7.5 out of 10. He criticized the episode for its portrayal of Robin as a jealous girlfriend, although he praised the episode for the editing and character appropriate way Ted behaved on his double date.
