= Definitions (How I Met Your Mother) =

- How I Met Your Mother episode
- Episode no.: Season 5 Episode 1
- Directed by: Pamela Fryman
- Written by: Carter Bays; Craig Thomas
- Production code: 5ALH01
- Original air date: September 21, 2009

Guest appearances
- Brett Ryback as Guy; Kim Matula as Girl; Abhi Sinha as Guy #2; Laura Ornelas as Girl #2; Dale E. Turner as Professor Calzonetti; Joe Manganiello as Brad

Episode chronology
← Previous "The Leap"	Next → "Double Date"
- How I Met Your Mother season 5

"Definitions" is the first episode of the fifth season of the How I Met Your Mother TV series and 89th episode overall. It originally aired on September 21, 2009.

== Plot ==
Future Ted explains how nervous he was his first day of teaching, when he was trying to figure out what kind of teacher he would be: formal disciplinarian or laid-back peer. Before the first class, Marshall gives Ted the gift of a worn leather fedora and whip, just like fictional professor Indiana Jones. That night, Ted has a dream about his first day. However, the dream quickly becomes a nightmare, causing Ted to wake in a panic and find Barney rifling through his nightstand for condoms.

At the first day of class, Ted quickly becomes anxious and alternates between being stern authority figure and laid-back buddy. Recalling his dream and deciding to take Barney's advice to not take any questions during the first class, Ted fails to learn from his students that he is in the wrong classroom. When the real professor arrives and announces that the class is for Economics, a humiliated Ted races across campus to his correct classroom. Exhausted and embarrassed, Ted does not have the energy to think about what kind of teacher he will be, and simply starts teaching, which turns out well. Future Ted adds that the mother had been in the Economics class, though he does not reveal where she had been sitting.

Meanwhile, after Barney and Robin finally confess their feelings towards each other, Lily is ecstatic to have another couple to double date with, but the two quickly tell her they are not dating. However, following the summer, they are caught making out on Ted's couch and admit that they spent the summer secretly having sex together. They say they have tried to have some discussion about their relationship ("the Talk"), only to discover that they hate talking about feelings and defining relationships. Later that night, Marshall's law school buddy Brad asks Robin out on a date to a hockey game.

At the arena, Robin is enthusiastic about the game, but admits that she feels weird going out with Brad, because she has feelings for Barney. Brad tells Robin she needs to have "the Talk" with Barney, and suddenly, they are put on the JumboTron for a public kiss. Back at the apartment, Ted tells Barney that Robin is already his girlfriend according to his "Gremlins" rule. During a tuxedo-themed night at the bar, Barney explains you cannot get a woman wet (let her shower in your house), expose her to sunlight (date her before sunset), or feed her after midnight (breakfast together), or she will turn into your girlfriend. Barney rushes to the arena and interrupts the New York Rangers "Kiss Cam" by ineffectually punching Brad in the face. After apologizing, he and Robin are still unable to admit that they are dating.

Back at the apartment, after another night of sex, Robin tries to leave the room, but the doorknob detaches. Lily reveals that she sabotaged the door to force them to define their relationship. After several notes that fail to satisfy Lily, they finally sit down and have "the Talk". They recall their bad experiences in relationships and agree they are not good at them, but do not want to stop having sex with each other. They decide to lie and tell Lily that they are boyfriend and girlfriend, though the lie clearly has elements of sincerity. Lily lets them out, and Barney and Robin go out to brunch. When Ted points out to Lily that Robin and Barney are lying to her, she responds that they do not realize they are not lying to each other, as she watches them holding hands together.

Later that night, after being left out of Tuxedo Night by Ted and Barney, Marshall shows up dressed to the nines at MacLaren's.

== Critical response ==
Donna Bowman of The A.V. Club rated the episode B+

Brian Zoromski of IGN gave the episode 9 out of 10.
