= The Rough Patch =

- How I Met Your Mother episode
- Episode no.: Season 5 Episode 7
- Directed by: Pamela Fryman
- Written by: Chris Harris
- Production code: 5ALH07
- Original air date: November 9, 2009

Guest appearances
- April Bowlby as Meg; Whit Hertford as Lost in Space Robot; Matt L. Jones as Pizza Guy; Alan Thicke as himself

Episode chronology
← Previous "Bagpipes"	Next → "The Playbook"
- How I Met Your Mother season 5

"The Rough Patch" is the seventh episode of the fifth season of the CBS sitcom How I Met Your Mother and 95th episode overall. It originally aired on November 9, 2009.

== Plot ==
Future Ted explains the gang's apprehension as Barney and Robin entered the later months of their relationship. Barney gives Ted all of his porn. Marshall can tell Barney is serious about Robin since he has developed "relationship gut" – weight put on when in a stable relationship from eating so much food. While trying to dispose of the porn after Marshall and Lily leave, Ted ends up watching a movie called "Archisexture", but the movie is suddenly overlapped by a message from Barney. The message assumes Barney is either dead or in a committed relationship, which he tells Ted to save him from. After showing the tape to Lily and Marshall, Ted starts to agree with the past Barney. Barney and Robin now have a declining attitude towards each other and their relationship, with Barney becoming morbidly obese and lethargic, and while Robin becomes haggard and snaps at him unreasonably (although Future Ted admits he is exaggerating and that they only let themselves go a little). Lily and Marshall just think the couple is going through a rough patch, and convince Ted not to interfere.

At MacLaren's, Marshall watches Barney eat an entire plate of ribs and asks him directly if he is happy. Not giving a proper answer, Barney describes his relationship in a depressing manner, convincing Marshall that he is unhappy. He and Ted ask Lily to help break up Barney and Robin, given her experience in plotting breakups. Since Lily has reformed her ways, she refuses. Ted plans a repeat of what broke up his relationship with Robin, involving champagne and a wedding ring. Much to their surprise, the plan results in the couple mutually surrendering to the idea of matrimony, out of pure convenience.

Lily agrees to break up Barney and Robin, and plans to remind them of their four biggest arguments: dirty dishes, Barney's ex-girlfriends, Stormtroopers, and a Canadian-American war. She contacts Robin's friend, Alan Thicke, to meet the couple at their usual diner, along with one of Barney's insane one-night stands, Meg (April Bowlby), a passing actor dressed as a Stormtrooper, and a busboy carrying dirty dishes.

The gang stakes out the location in a rented station wagon. Marshall is annoyed at Ted for being too cheap to rent a real stake-out van, Thicke and Meg arrive and apparently know each other, and Lily was unable to find a Stormtrooper and instead finds a man dressed as the robot from Lost in Space, as she thinks Stormtroopers are also robots. As they argue over the station wagon and a pizza delivery, Barney and Robin look right in their direction. Ted and Marshall think their cover is blown, but Lily executes the plan anyway. As the plan unfolds, they notice that neither Barney nor Robin are angry or arguing, and they kiss each other before leaving the diner.

In MacLaren's the gang share a beer with Thicke and the pizza delivery boy, and Robin stops by and explains that she and Barney have broken up. What the gang thought was Robin and Barney looking at them was really the couple aghast at their own reflections. The realization makes them examine their relationship and they agree that "two awesomes cancel each other out", making them less than they want to be, so they break up. Barney laments that they will not be able to go back to being friends, but Robin tells him not think of it as a break-up but as getting back together as friends. They quickly avoid all of Lily's traps and kiss each other goodbye. Although Robin says it might take Barney a while to recover from the breakup, he appears as his old self, catching enticing glances from most of the women in the bar and declaring "Daddy's home".

Before he leaves, Thicke reveals that he and Robin starred in a short-lived Canadian variety show. Barney runs off to find the footage.

== Critical response ==
Reviewer Scott Tobias from The A.V. Club, though skeptical of fat suits for what he describes as the Norbit Rule, felt it was worth it thanks to the "I'm my own wingman tonight" quip, and thought everything Alan Thicke related was funny. He is disappointed to see the show retreat back to where it was before but accepts Barney and Robin are not same characters unless independent. He gives the episode a rating of A− describing it as a near-classic.

Brian Zoromski of IGN gave the episode 7.8 out of 10.

Joel Keller of TV Squad notes this episode makes particularly effective use of Future Ted (Bob Saget) and the exaggerations and distortions he lends to the story, from fat Barney and haggard Robin, to the video flying magically into the player.

Eric Hochberger of TV Critic really enjoyed the ArchiSEXture idea.
