= The Playbook (How I Met Your Mother) =

- How I Met Your Mother episode
- Episode no.: Season 5 Episode 8
- Directed by: Pamela Fryman
- Written by: Carter Bays; Craig Thomas
- Production code: 5ALH08
- Original air date: November 16, 2009

Guest appearances
- Sarah Wright as Claire; Eva Amurri as Shelly

Episode chronology
← Previous "The Rough Patch"	Next → "Slapsgiving 2: Revenge of the Slap"
- How I Met Your Mother season 5

"The Playbook" is the eighth episode of the fifth season of the CBS situation comedy How I Met Your Mother and 96th episode overall. It originally aired November 16, 2009. A book based on the episode was published in 2010.

== Plot ==
Future Ted explains the key to dating is self-confidence, which Barney had in spades, but usually that confidence was in one of his characters. One night, Barney appears in full scuba suit while drinking scotch. Lily pulls aside Claire (Sarah Wright), a blonde woman at the bar, warning her of Barney's villainy, and she sits down with the rest of the gang as they explain the events that lead up to that night.

Barney and Robin are coping with the end of their relationship in their own different ways. Robin says she wants to focus on her career, but Marshall and Ted are convinced she will find the love of her life, citing several friends who gave up on dating to focus on their work, only to be married months later. Barney, on the other hand, decides to re-enter the dating scene, using his sacred "Playbook". The book describes a set of con artist scenarios designed by Barney to manipulate girls into bed.

Meanwhile, Lily tries to set up Ted with Shelly, a fellow teacher. When she had originally tried to get them to meet, Lily found Ted and Marshall in the middle of a chicken-finger mouth-stuffing attempt, so she convinced her coworker that Ted was not there. However, Ted is stood up by Shelly; when Lily confronts her, she discovers that Shelly was seduced by an exotic man at MacLaren's. Lily realizes it was Barney and angrily confronts him. Barney describes the play he used, the "Lorenzo von Matterhorn", using fake websites, a smartphone, and an exotic name.

Barney's next move is a play called "he's not coming", where he seduces vulnerable girls at the top of the Empire State Building. One of the girls Barney picks up, however, is an actress friend of Lily's, and she steals the playbook when in Barney's apartment. Lily reveals the ploy to Barney and threatens to post the playbook on the Internet if he does not stop using it. Barney shows up at the apartment in a scuba suit, saying he has one last play, "The Scuba Diver". While preparing to post the playbook, Marshall is bamboozled as "The Scuba Diver" is not in the playbook, having been torn away by Barney. They go down to the bar, where Barney sits in a booth, planning to seduce Claire, the blonde by the bar.

As they conclude the story there with Claire, they ask Barney what "The Scuba Diver" is, and he breaks down, saying his breakup with Robin was hurting him more than he thought, and this was how he coped. Touched, the gang convinces Claire to go out with Barney for a cup of coffee. After they leave, the gang gets a text message from Barney and finds the description of the "Scuba Diver" under their table at MacLaren's. It was actually an elaborate con; involving Lily's disgust at the playbook, revealing Barney's tricks to Claire, Barney's fake breakdown over his breakup, and his friends encouraging the prey to go with Barney.

Finally, a new co-host, Don, arrives at Robin's pre-morning show, and Robin suddenly realizes that Ted and Marshall may have been right.

=== Music ===
Non-original music used in this episode includes Mozart's Rondo Alla Turca and a piano version of Nino Rota's "A Time for Us" from Franco Zeffirelli's 1968 film Romeo and Juliet.

== Critical response ==
Donna Bowman of The A.V. Club graded the episode an A− in her review; she cheered the return of the "unredeemed essence" of Barney in the wake of his breakup with Robin. Brian Zoromski of IGN gave the episode 9.6 out of 10.

Cindy McLennan of Television Without Pity gave it an A because "it was supremely funny", even as a stand-alone.
