= Home Wreckers =

- How I Met Your Mother episode
- Episode no.: Season 5 Episode 20
- Directed by: Pamela Fryman
- Written by: Chris Harris
- Production code: 5ALH20
- Original air date: April 19, 2010

Guest appearances
- Cristine Rose as Virginia Mosby; Harry Groener as Clint; Gary Anthony Williams as Inspector; Linda Porter as Muriel

Episode chronology
← Previous "Zoo or False"	Next → "Twin Beds"
- How I Met Your Mother season 5

"Home Wreckers" is the 20th episode of the fifth season of the CBS situation comedy How I Met Your Mother and 108th episode overall. It aired on April 19, 2010.

== Plot ==
Ted is stunned when his mother and her long-term boyfriend Clint announce they are going to be married. At the reception, Ted is unable to grasp the fact that his mother is getting married a second time before he has even once, and when Clint begins singing an erotic but bizarre song, Ted flees without giving his toast. Three days later, Ted reveals that he has bid for and bought a house. The gang questions his decision, as the house is old and dilapidated, but Ted is convinced that as an architect he can fix up the house once he starts a family. The group berates Ted for making this decision too early, seeing as he is not even married yet.

Meanwhile, Barney catches Robin crying during Clint's song at the wedding, and takes every opportunity to mock her for it. Robin finally snaps and reveals it was in fact Barney who was crying, and that he offered to pay Robin to keep quiet and say she had been the one shedding tears. Barney claims he was jealous of Clint, revealing he had once kissed Ted's mother while dropping her off at the airport after their brunch in 2006, though the rest of the group doubts his story.

Marshall tries to take the pressure off Ted by having the group play a game where they try and guess whether Marshall had been a kid or drunk during wild and stupid instances in his life (such as putting fireworks in the microwave). When an inspector arrives and begins rambling off the number of problems with the house, Ted finally agrees with the group, especially after the inspector is injured when he falls through the ceiling. Dejected, Ted wonders if he will ever have the life he dreams of; Lily cheers him up by telling him to bash at the house with a sledgehammer, and the whole group has fun smashing a wall with it.

Ted goes back to Ohio to see his mother and Clint, and gives them the toast he had meant to give earlier. Later, Ted returns to the house, and finds Marshall cooking sausages on a grill in the back. Marshall knows Ted is not going to give up on the house, and Ted thanks him for sticking up for him and tells him his plans for it. Future Ted tells his kids that time can turn what seem to be stupid decisions into something else and that he did achieve his dreams for the house; it is the same house in which Ted is telling his kids the story of how he met their mother.

== Critical response ==
Donna Bowman of The A.V. Club gave the episode a B+. She said the episode exposed a different angle on Ted's love story by showing where his future family would live. She noted the execution of Marshall's Drunk or Kid game and Barney's exaggerated recollections were a bit off.

Cindy McLennan of Television Without Pity also gave the episode a B+ score, citing the implausibility of having a real-estate inspector study the house when Ted's architecture skills can determine the flaws as well.

IGN gave the episode 8.3 out of 10.
