= The Wedding Bride =

- How I Met Your Mother episode
- Episode no.: Season 5 Episode 23
- Directed by: Pamela Fryman
- Written by: Stephen Lloyd
- Production code: 5ALH24
- Original air date: May 17, 2010

Guest appearances
- Judy Greer as Royce; Jason Lewis as Movie Tony; Malin Åkerman as Movie Stella; Chris Kattan as Jed Mosley; Jacob Hopkins as Billy

Episode chronology
← Previous "Robots Versus Wrestlers"	Next → "Doppelgangers"
- How I Met Your Mother season 5

"The Wedding Bride" is the 23rd episode of the fifth season of the CBS sitcom How I Met Your Mother and is the 111th episode overall. It originally aired on May 17, 2010. Guest stars include Judy Greer, Jason Lewis, Malin Åkerman, and Chris Kattan.

== Plot ==
Future Ted talks to his kids about how everyone in their 30s tends to have "baggage". He talks about dating a girl named Royce who seems to have no baggage, despite several false starts in his apartment. The gang discusses their own baggage; Marshall's, for example, is that he is too nice and trusting.

When Ted watches the new movie The Wedding Bride with Royce, he discovers that it is based on his relationship with Stella and was written by Tony, the man she left him for at the altar; the character based on Ted, "Jed Mosley", is depicted as an over-the-top antagonist and "the most corrupt architect in New York City". He points out that several instances of his and Stella's relationship that were romantic were depicted in the movie so that he came off as antagonistic. Royce helps Ted realize that he has his own baggage, having been left at the altar. His friends also tell him that he should tell Royce the truth, but Ted believes he can ignore it despite the movie becoming the fifth-highest-grossing movie of all time. When Royce's friends talk about going to see the film again, he becomes upset and walks out on her. Also to his annoyance, his friends also become fans of the movie.

Marshall ultimately reminds Ted that he is fundamentally a good person. Ted rushes to the cinema where Royce is again watching the film and admits that the film is based on his life. With Barney telling Royce "Kiss him" (Future Ted says that "Barney didn't say 'Kiss,' implying that Barney actually said "Fuck") from the audience while the minister in the movie actually says "Kiss him," he kisses Royce in front of the screen displaying a kiss scene from the film and takes her back to his apartment for pancakes. Royce reveals serious personal issues, prompting Ted to end the relationship.

Meanwhile, Lily and Robin try to convince Marshall to be more assertive after he accidentally helps several thieves rob an apartment.

== Critical response ==
Donna Bowman of The A.V. Club rated the episode grade B−.

Amanda Sloane Murray of IGN gave the episode a grade of 9.3. She stated that the concept of a romantic comedy within a romantic comedy was a challenge for the writers, given the task of creating a fictional movie for the episode and casting actors who have themselves played characters in romantic comedies.

DeAnn Welker of Television Without Pity gave the episode a B− rating.

Steve Marsi of TV Critic gave the episode 4.5 out of 5 and called it "Legendary".

== Cultural references ==
Part of the soundtrack of the 2003 film Love Actually is used in the episode.
