= Robots Versus Wrestlers =

- How I Met Your Mother episode
- Episode no.: Season 5 Episode 22
- Directed by: Rob Greenberg
- Written by: Jamie Rhonheimer
- Production code: 5ALH21
- Original air date: May 10, 2010

Guest appearances
- Rebecca Klingler as Marla; Darby Stanchfield as Marissa Heller; Michael York as Jefferson Van Smoot; Ed Brigadier as Waiter; Michele Boyd as Jolene; Brea Cola as Hannah; Peter Bogdanovich as himself; Will Shortz as himself; Arianna Huffington as herself

Episode chronology
← Previous "Twin Beds"	Next → "The Wedding Bride"
- How I Met Your Mother season 5

"Robots Versus Wrestlers " is the 22nd episode of the fifth season of the CBS sitcom How I Met Your Mother and 110th episode overall. It aired on May 10, 2010.

== Plot ==
Barney is excited to get the gang to come with him to a grandscale fighting match called "Robots Versus Wrestlers". Barney had bought a fifth ticket for Robin, despite knowing she had wished to spend time away from them, and indeed she ends up declining. Meanwhile, Ted finds himself continuously snubbed by his friends whenever he tries to appear intellectual, such as by reciting a poem, as his friends always make fart noises to interrupt him. At Ted's apartment, Barney finds an envelope addressed to Marissa Heller, who Ted explains was the apartment's previous occupant. Ted has been receiving her mail ever since they had moved in 10 years ago, and over the years, he and Marshall had become curious about her personality. Ted opens the envelope, which is an invitation to a high-society party in the Alberta Building, a famous building that Ted describes as the most beautiful in Manhattan. Unfortunately, the party is the same night as "Robots Versus Wrestlers", so Ted convinces the gang they will make a brief appearance at the party before heading over to Robots, having Lily pretend to be Marissa so that they can gain entry to the party.

As Lily is about to introduce herself as Marissa to the doorman, the real Marissa arrives, foiling their plan. Ted manages to impress Marissa with his intellectual knowledge, and Marissa agrees to take the group with her up to the party. Ted has a great time at the party, becoming a big hit, while Marshall, Lily, and Barney find it boring and want to leave. Ted decides to stay, leaving Barney hurt, as he, Marshall and Lily head to the Robots event.

At "Robots Versus Wrestlers", Barney is bothered by the fact that their group appears to be growing apart: Robin moving in with Don, Ted leaving them for the party, and Marshall and Lily possibly having a baby soon. Lily assures Barney that, though they might drift apart, they will still remain friends. Meanwhile, Ted continues to have a good time at the party and begins reciting a poem to everyone there, in the original Italian. As he does so, Ted is amazed no one interrupts him and realizes maybe he has gone too far, and wishes someone would stop him. At that moment, Marshall and the others discover Ted's doppelgänger, a Mexican wrestler at the event. Barney sends Ted a picture, who upon seeing it immediately leaves the party.

At MacLaren's, Marshall asks Lily to seriously consider the possibility of having a baby. Lily points out they will not be able to do as many fun things as before, such as finding Ted's doppelgänger. They agree not to start trying for a baby until after they find the fifth doppelgänger of the group, Barney's. Ted arrives later, where Barney apologizes to him and allows to him to recite another poem. As Ted begins to do so, Robin arrives and interrupts him with a fart noise. As the gang shows her Ted's doppelgänger, Future Ted explains that, although the group grew apart one time or another, they always made sure to get together every year for "Robots Versus Wrestlers".

== Critical response ==
Donna Bowman of The A.V. Club rated the episode grade A.

Amanda Sloane Murray of IGN gave the episode 7.2 out of 10. "With its rare departure from the show's signature blend of flashbacks and cutaways, this episode often felt like it was ganked from a completely different, less funny show."

Cindy McLennan of Television Without Pity gave the episode a C+ rating.
