= Greg Malins =

American producer and screenwriter

- Born: December 5, 1967 (age 57); Seattle, Washington, U.S.
- Occupation(s): Television producer, screenwriter
- Spouse: Jennifer Milmore (m. 1999)

Greg Malins (born December 5, 1967) is an American television producer and screenwriter.

He served as an executive producer on the American sitcom Friends from 1998 to 2001. Malins has been nominated for four Primetime Emmy Awards in the category of Outstanding Comedy Series.
