= How I Met Your Mother =

American sitcom (2005–2014)

- Genre: Sitcom
- Created by: Carter Bays & Craig Thomas
- Showrunners: Carter Bays; Craig Thomas
- Directed by: Pamela Fryman; Rob Greenberg; Michael Shea; Neil Patrick Harris
- Starring: Joshua Radnor; Jason Segel; Cobie Smulders; Neil Patrick Harris; Alyson Hannigan; Cristin Milioti
- Narrated by: Bob Saget
- Music by: John Swihart
- Opening theme: "Hey, Beautiful" by The Solids
- Country of origin: United States
- Original language: English
- No. of seasons: 9
- No. of episodes: 208 (list of episodes)

Production
- Executive producers: Carter Bays; Craig Thomas; Rob Greenberg (pilot); Pamela Fryman; Eileen Heisler (season 1); DeAnn Heline (season 1); Greg Malins; Chris Harris; Stephen Lloyd; Kourtney Kang; Jamie Rhonheimer; Chuck Tatham
- Producers: Randy Cordray (pilot); Suzy Mamann Greenberg; Chris Harris; Jamie Rhonheimer; Kourtney Kang; Brenda Hsueh; Theresa Mulligan Rosenthal; Stewart Halpern-Fingerhut; Rob Greenberg; Tami Sagher
- Cinematography: Steven V. Silver (pilot); Christian La Fountaine
- Editor: Sue Federman
- Camera setup: Multi-camera
- Running time: 22 minutes
- Production companies: Bays Thomas Productions; 20th Century Fox Television

Original release
- Network: CBS
- Release: September 19, 2005 – March 31, 2014

Related
- How I Met Your Dad; How I Met Your Father

How I Met Your Mother (often abbreviated HIMYM) is an American sitcom created by Craig Thomas and Carter Bays for CBS. The series, which aired from September 19, 2005, to March 31, 2014, follows main character Ted Mosby and his group of friends in New York City's Manhattan. As a frame story, Ted (in 2030) recounts to his children Penny and Luke the events from September 2005 to May 2013 that led to him meeting their mother.

The series was loosely inspired by Thomas and Bays' friendship when they both lived in New York. The vast majority of the episodes (196 out of 208) were directed by Pamela Fryman. The other directors were Rob Greenberg (7 episodes), Michael Shea (4 episodes), and Neil Patrick Harris (1 episode).

Known for its non-contemporary structure, humor, and incorporation of dramatic elements, How I Met Your Mother was popular throughout its run. It received positive reviews initially, but reception became more mixed as the seasons went on. The show was nominated for 91 awards and received 21.

== Premise ==
The series follows the adventures of Ted Mosby (Joshua Radnor) and his love life as a single man. His stories are narrated by Bob Saget as Ted Mosby 25 years later, as he tells them to his adolescent children, Luke (named after Luke Skywalker) and Penny (named after Ted's love for coins).

The narrative leads to a flashback, and the story proper starts in 2005 with 27-year-old Ted Mosby living in New York City and working as an architect. The story deals primarily with his four best friends. These include the long-standing couple Marshall Eriksen (Jason Segel), a law student, and Lily Aldrin (Alyson Hannigan), a kindergarten teacher, who have been dating for almost nine years when Marshall proposes; and the playboy Barney Stinson (Neil Patrick Harris) and the Canadian news reporter Robin Scherbatsky (Cobie Smulders). All of the characters' lives are intertwined. The series explores many story lines, including "will they or won't they" relationships between Robin and each of the two single male friends, Marshall and Lily's relationship, and the ups and downs of the characters' careers.

The show's frame story depicts Ted (voice of Bob Saget, uncredited) telling the story to his son Luke (David Henrie) and daughter Penny (Lyndsy Fonseca) as they sit on the couch in the year 2030. This frame is the show's putative narrative present, and How I Met Your Mother exploits this narrative structure in numerous ways: to depict and re-depict events from multiple points of view; to set up jokes using quick and sometimes multiple flashbacks nested within the oral retelling; to substitute visual, verbal, or aural euphemisms for activities Ted does not want to talk about with his children (sexual practices, use of illicit substances, vulgar language, etc.)(ex."Sandwiches" used to refer to marijuana)

Although the traditional love story structure begins when the lead characters first meet, How I Met Your Mother does not introduce Ted's wife (Cristin Milioti) until the eighth-season finale and only announces her full name, Tracy McConnell, during the series finale. Her first name, Tracy, is mentioned in the first season at the end of episode nine.

== Production ==
How I Met Your Mother was inspired by Carter Bays and Craig Thomas' idea to "write about our friends and the stupid stuff we did in New York", where they previously worked as writers for Late Show with David Letterman, among others. The two drew from their friendship in creating the characters. Ted is based loosely on Bays, and Marshall and Lily are based loosely on Thomas and his wife. Thomas' wife Rebecca was initially reluctant to have a character based on her but agreed if they could get Alyson Hannigan to play her. Hannigan was looking to do more comedy work and was available. Joshua Radnor and Jason Segel, who were cast as Ted and Marshall, respectively, were not well known, although Segel had been a cast member on the short-lived Freaks and Geeks and a recurring guest star on Judd Apatow's follow-up show, Undeclared. The role of Barney was initially envisioned as a "John Belushi-type character" before Neil Patrick Harris won the role after being invited to an audition by the show's casting director Megan Branman. Pamela Fryman invited Bob Saget to be the voice-over narrator, Future Ted, explaining to him that the show would be like The Wonder Years but "kind of into the future". Saget either went to the television studio and recorded the narration while watching the episode, or did so separately and rerecorded with the episode if necessary. He normally did not attend table readings but did so for the last episode.

In multiple interviews Bays and Thomas have stated that "a pretty famous actress" turned down the role of Robin, who they revealed in February 2014 was Jennifer Love Hewitt. They then cast the unknown Cobie Smulders; Bays and Thomas later said, "Thank God we did for a million reasons... when Ted's seeing her for the first time, America's seeing her for the first time—the intrigue of that propelled the show going forward and kept the show alive". Although Ted is initially smitten by Robin in the pilot, it is quickly established at the end of the episode that she is not the mother, which Thomas said was done so they would not repeat the "will they or won't they" Ross and Rachel storyline from Friends.

According to an Entertainment Weekly article, the writers adopted facets of each main actor's personality and incorporated them into their characters. This includes Neil Patrick Harris' skills with magic, Jason Segel's passion for songwriting, Alyson Hannigan's absent-mindedness while pregnant, and Josh Radnor's intellectualism.

MacLaren's, an Irish bar in the middle of New York City, in which a lot of the show is set, is loosely based on four of Bays and Thomas's favorite bars: McGee's, a Midtown tavern near the Ed Sullivan Theater where the Late Show is taped; McHale's, a legendary Hell's Kitchen bar which closed in 2006; Chumley's, a since-closed historic Greenwich Village pub; and Fez, another closed bar on the Upper West Side. McGee's had a mural that Bays and Thomas both liked and wanted to incorporate into the show. The name for the bar is from Carter Bays' assistant, Carl MacLaren; the bartender in the show is also named Carl.

Episodes were generally shot over a three-day period in the Los Angeles-based Soundstage Studio 22 and featured upwards of 50 scenes with quick transitions and flashbacks. However, the pilot episode was filmed at CBS Radford. The laugh track was later created by recording an audience being shown the final edited episode. Thomas claimed that shooting before a live audience would have been impossible because of the structure of the show and the numerous flashforwards in each episode and because doing so "would blur the line between 'audience' and 'hostage situation'". Later seasons started filming in front of an audience on occasion, when smaller sets were used.

The theme song is a portion of "Hey Beautiful" by The Solids, of which Bays and Thomas are members. Episodes from season 1 generally started with the opening credits. A cold opening was used from season 2 onwards. Viewers then occasionally see Ted's children on a couch and hear him talking to them, telling the story of how he met their mother. Alternatively, scenes from previous episodes or shots of New York City are shown with Ted narrating over them. Thomas has stated that Future Ted is an unreliable narrator, since he is trying to tell a story that happened over 20 years earlier; this has been a plot point in several episodes including "The Goat", "Oh Honey", "How I Met Everyone Else", and "The Mermaid Theory". Nevertheless, Thomas has also emphasized maintaining a coherent and consistent universe and trying to avoid continuity errors, a problem he noticed in other shows.

A scene relating to the identity of the mother, involving Ted's future children, was filmed in 2006 for the show's eventual series finale. This was done because the teenage actors portraying them would be adults by the time the final season was shot.

During the 2007–2008 Writers Guild of America strike, How I Met Your Mother shut down production; when the strike ended, the show returned on March 17, 2008, with nine new episodes. The network announced a change in the timeslot to 8:30 pm ET/7:30 pm CT, flip-flopping from the summer schedule with The Big Bang Theory. CBS renewed the show for a fourth season on May 14, 2008, which premiered on September 22, 2008.

In September 2008, Lifetime Television announced it had purchased the cable rerun rights to How I Met Your Mother at a rate of about $725,000 per episode. The four-year syndication contract stipulated that the studio deliver at least 110 half-hour episodes by 2010 and allowed for up to eight seasons of the show. At the end of the fourth season only 88 episodes had been produced, and a further 22 episodes were required, ensuring that there would be a fifth season. There also was a complication with the writing of the show because of Alyson Hannigan's absence due to her pregnancy; in response, the writers had to create episodes that did not include one of the five main characters. On May 19, 2009, the fifth-season renewal was announced. May 20, 2009, CBS announced that How I Met Your Mother would again be aired at 8 pm, leading into the new comedy Accidentally on Purpose. On January 12, 2010, the show aired its 100th episode, and CBS announced that the series would return for a sixth season. Upon learning that the series would be syndicated, Thomas said, "We're thrilled that it will live on in other forms," and they were proud of the show and it was great to see the strong demand.

Reruns of the series began airing on local American broadcast television stations and on Chicago-based cable superstation WGN America on September 14, 2010. Featured in these airings are vanity cards previously unseen in the CBS and Lifetime airings due to marginalized credit sequences used by the two networks. Shown in between the closing credits and the production company credits, these vanity cards show portions of "The Bro Code", a list of rules frequently referenced by Harris' character, Barney Stinson, on how men should interact with each other, with an emphasis on activities involving pursuing members of the opposite sex. The opening theme song for the syndicated reruns is also slightly edited, running shorter and not using all the pictures seen in the opening montage that runs on DVD and the original CBS broadcasts. The episodes are also slightly shorter, to allow for more commercials during a timeslot in syndication.

One of the series' traditions involved giving guest roles to actors from various Joss Whedon productions, many of whom co-starred with Hannigan on Buffy the Vampire Slayer. Bays attributed this to their being "huge fans" and to those casts representing "a big talent pool".

On March 4, 2011, CBS announced that the show had been renewed for two more seasons, with the seventh season premiering with back-to-back episodes on September 19, 2011.

On July 27, 2011, the FX channel announced it had picked up the series for syndication. On September 5, 2011, FX began airing the series.

Cast members had said the show would not run longer than eight seasons, but a ninth season was secured in December 2012 amid tense negotiations with the studios and the actors—especially Segel, who had wanted to move on to other ventures after the eighth season. During these negotiations, Bays and Thomas originally approached the eighth season as if it were the show's last, but had a "Plan B" in case the show were renewed. After producers secured a ninth season, they implemented plans to secretly cast the titular future mother, with Cristin Milioti eventually winning the role, having bested at least two other contenders. Milioti first appeared in the last scene in the season eight finale "Something New" and was a regular cast member in the show's final season. This was the first time the show had expanded its core roster.

In January 2013, How I Met Your Mother was renewed for a ninth season. Carter Bays told Entertainment Weekly that season 9 would "feature some of the most non-linear episodes we've ever done".

The season 9 premiere episode aired on September 23, 2013, and the one-hour series finale aired on March 31, 2014.

== Syndication ==
How I Met Your Mother aired on Nick at Nite from September 8, 2014, to December 27, 2015, and TV Land from June 29, 2015, to 2018. It also aired on FX from September 5, 2011, to 2019, and Lifetime from 2009 to 2018.

== Cast and characters ==
Main cast

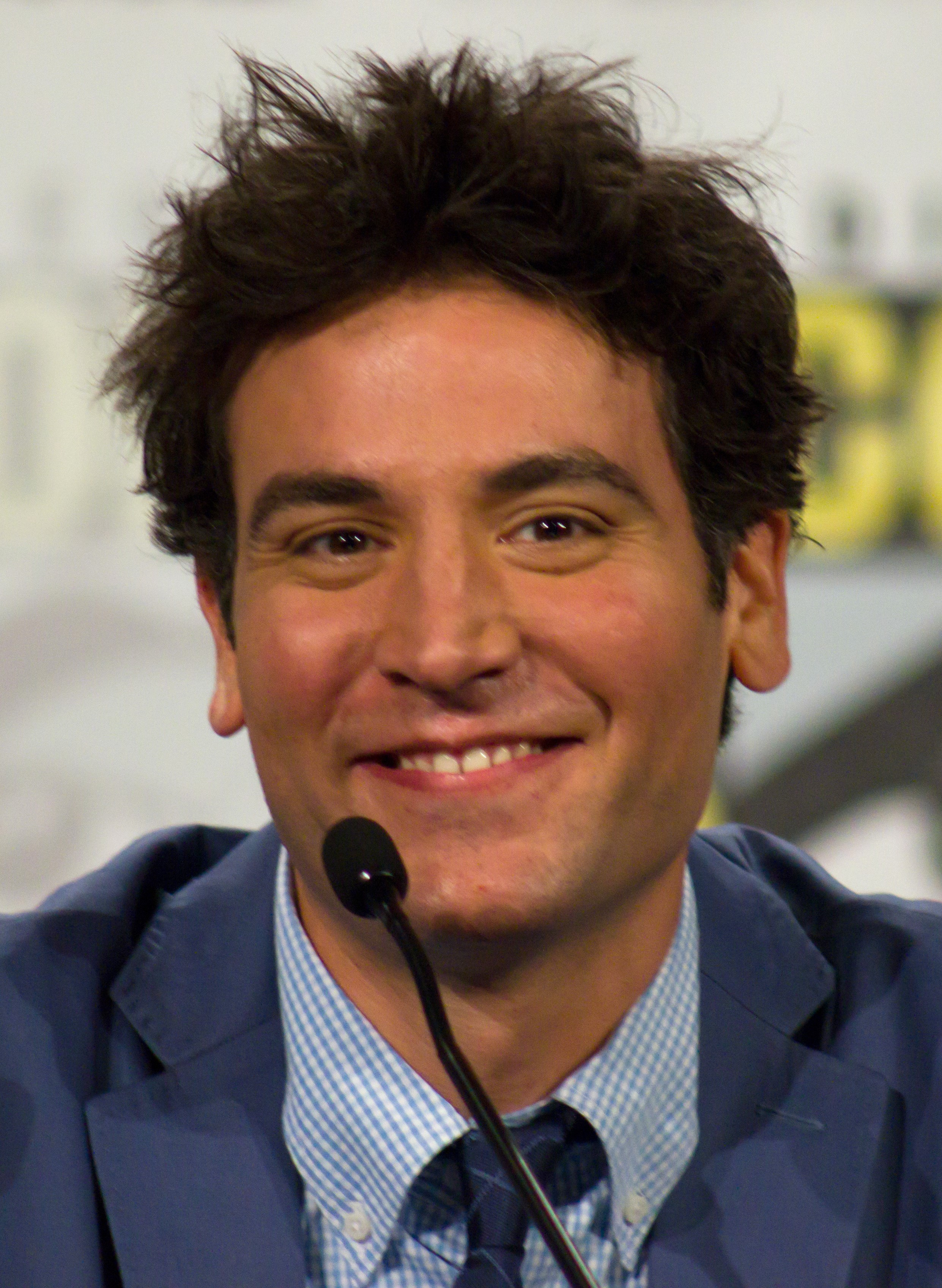
Josh Radnor
Ted Mosby

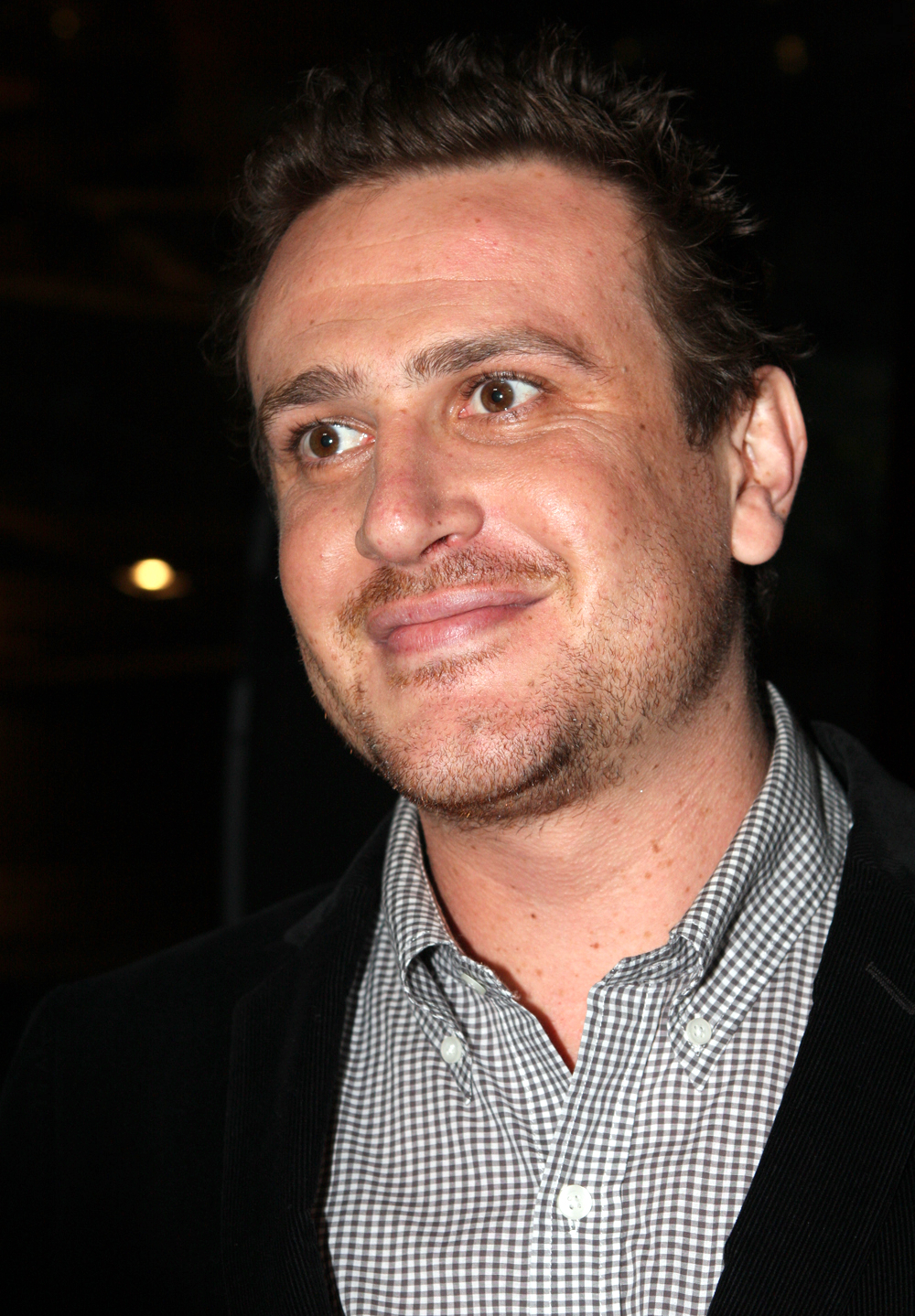
Jason Segel
Marshall Eriksen

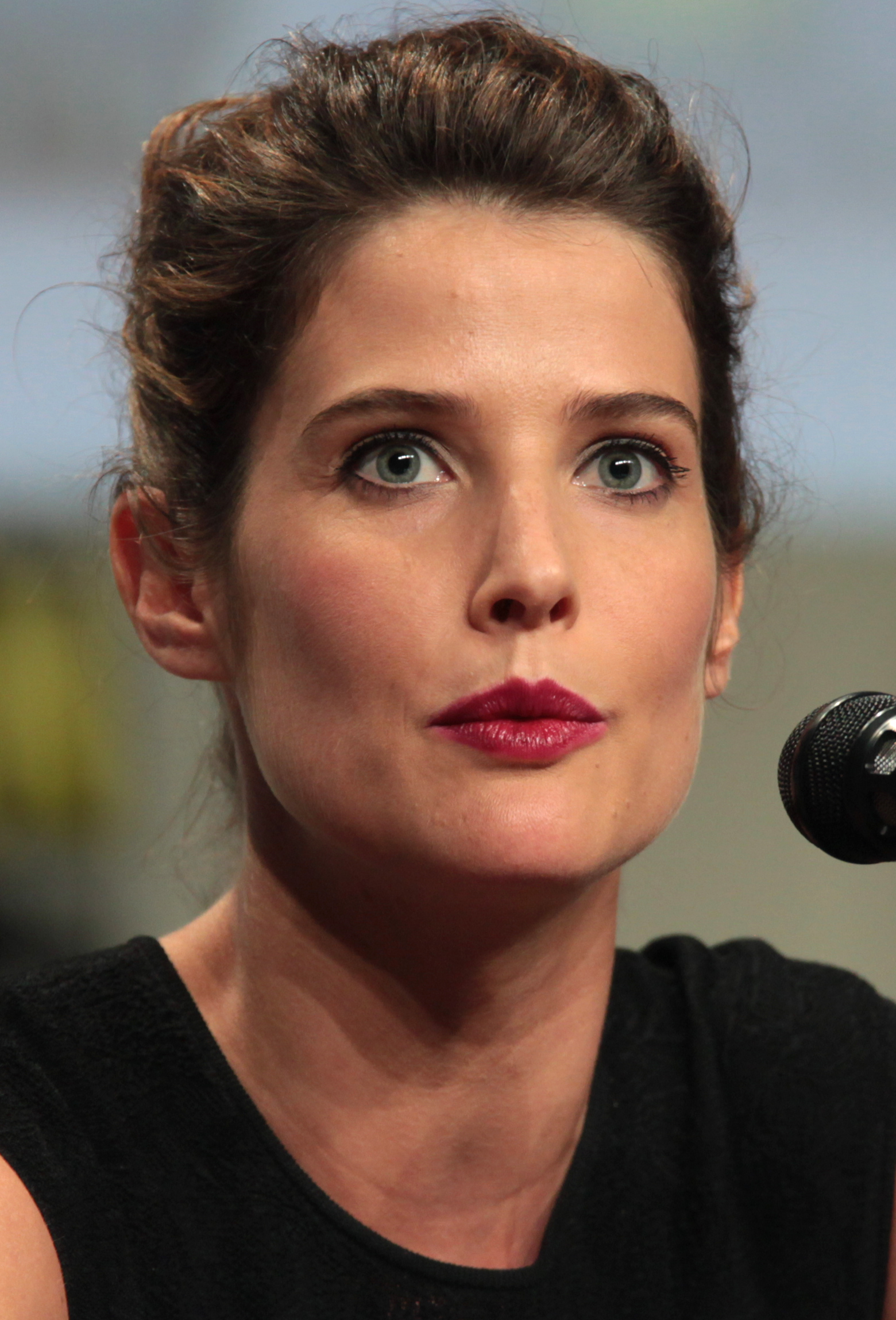
Cobie Smulders
Robin Scherbatsky

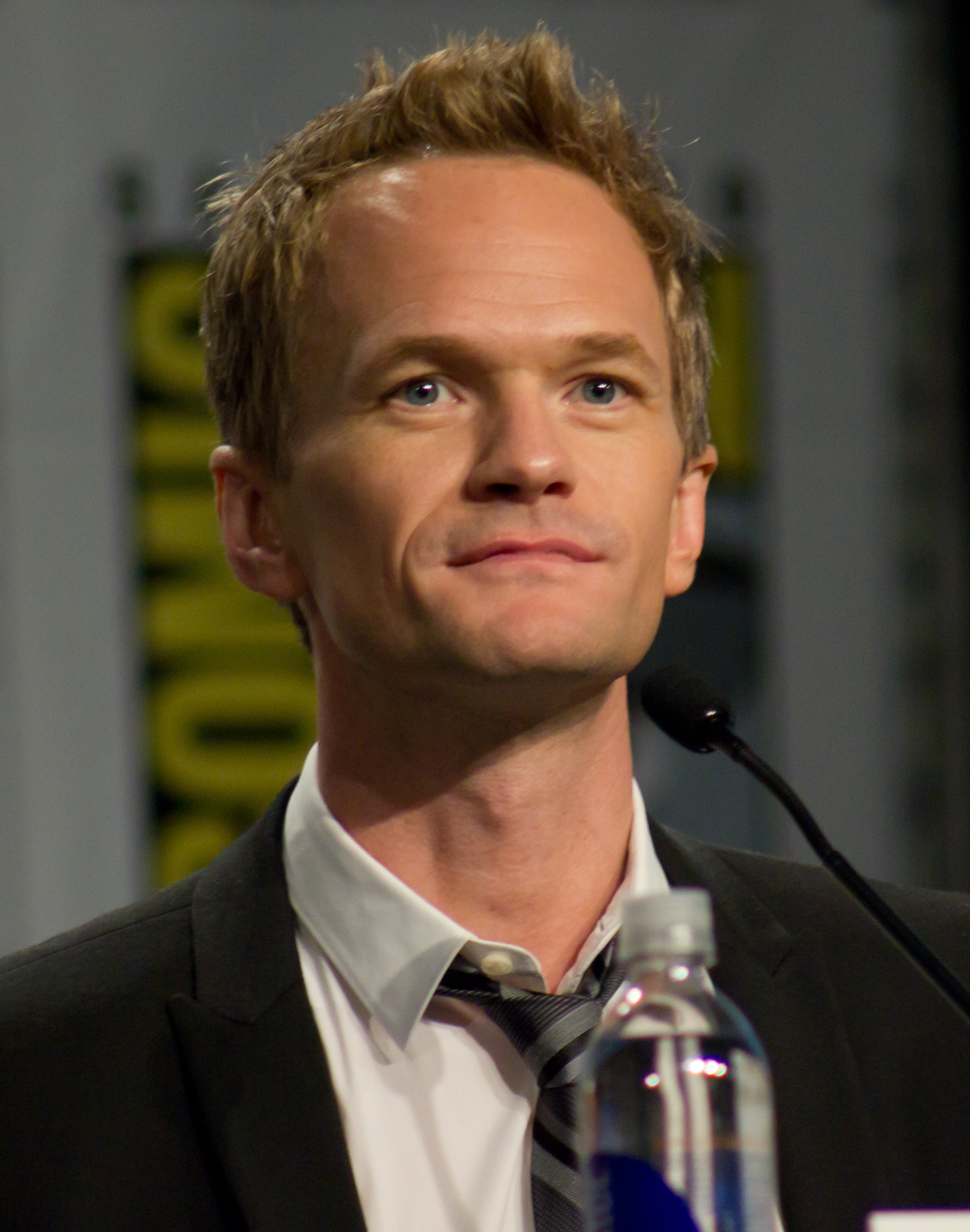
Neil Patrick Harris
Barney Stinson

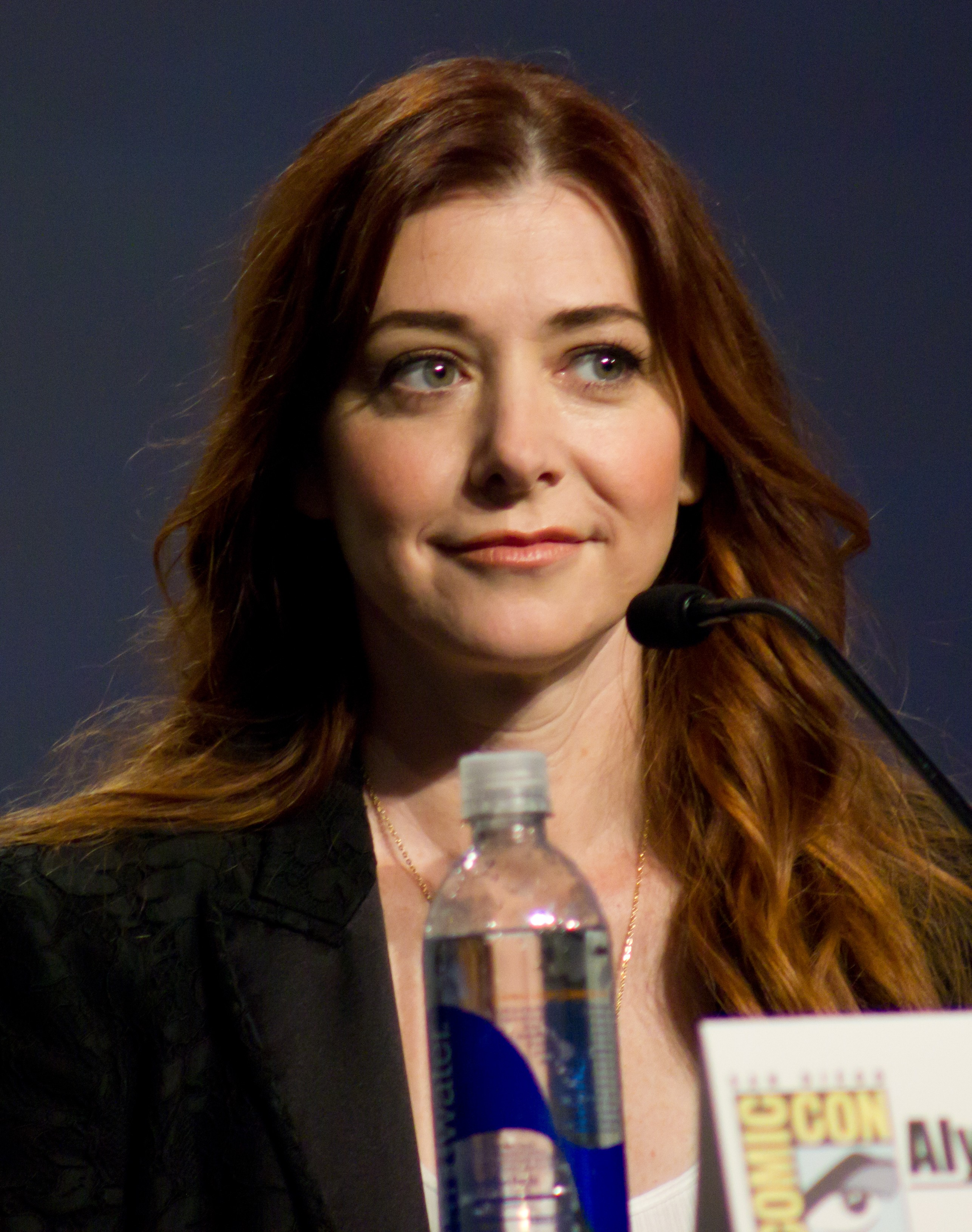
Alyson Hannigan
Lily Aldrin

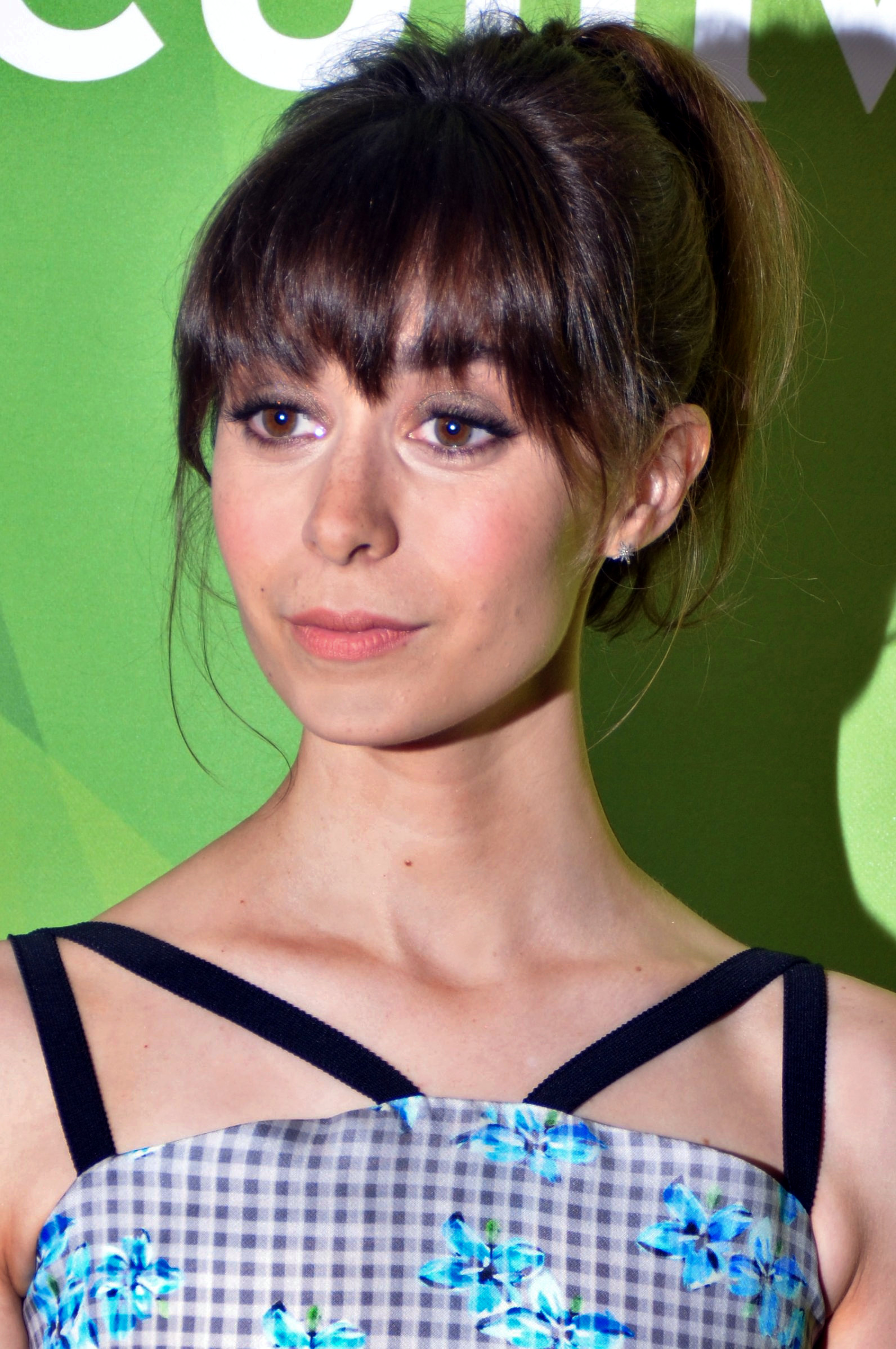
Cristin Milioti
Tracy McConnell
- Josh Radnor as Ted Mosby, an architect, college professor and the central character of the series. He tells the story of his adult years from his late twenties to his mid thirties, and all the obstacles he overcomes before he meets "The One" (the Mother). This story is told by the Older Ted Mosby, and narrator of the series, Bob Saget. Ted moved to New York City with his friends Marshall and Lily after graduating from Wesleyan University. In New York, he met Barney (at the urinal of MacLaren's) and Robin, to whom he was immediately attracted. Ted is on a quest for happiness and "The One", the woman he will marry. He has many relationships, one with Robin, that reveal the qualities he wants in his future wife. At the end of each relationship, with levity, he reflects on what went wrong. Although hope to find "the one" diminishes with each failed relationship, Ted does not give up. He has more elegant and higher-class interests than his friends. He goes to great lengths to profess his love to the women in his life, but they all falter eventually. Despite these qualities, Ted often acts immaturely, such as in wild activities with Barney. In the show's finale, he says that, in Tracy, he had met the love of his life (the titular Mother), but only after he is finished telling the story does he accept that he is ready to move on and admit he is still in love with Robin.
- Jason Segel as Marshall Eriksen, Ted Mosby's best friend. Marshall and Ted were roommates at Wesleyan, and remained living together when they moved to New York. In season 2 Marshall marries Lily, with whom he has been in love since his freshman year of college; they have a child during season 7. Marshall was born in St. Cloud, Minnesota, where his family and culture are the foundation of major conflicts he faces in the series. He has an interest in the paranormal and mythical creatures, particularly Sasquatch. His dream to be an environmental lawyer conflicts with his immediate need for money, such as for his wedding and to raise his children. He however, eventually switches from his corporate job, to his dream, environmental lawyer job, taking the pay cut willingly to help protect the environment. By the end of the sitcom, he has become a New York supreme court justice.
- Cobie Smulders as Robin Scherbatsky, a news anchor trying to make it as a journalist who dates both Ted and Barney. Robin emigrated from Canada to take a job at a news station and met Ted at MacLaren's; her Canadian background is a source of many jokes from her friends, for instance, 'Robin Sparkles' which was her stage name as a Canadian teenage pop-star. She is very career-centric and rejects traditional roles, such as getting married and having kids. Robin often drinks scotch and smokes cigars, and is an avid gun fan. She and Barney get engaged and marry in the penultimate episode of the series, but divorce in the first part of the series finale, three years later. Smulders's husband Taran Killam appeared in six episodes as Gary Blauman.
- Neil Patrick Harris as Barney Stinson, a serial playboy, using his relative wealth and an array of outrageous strategies to seduce women with no intention of engaging in a relationship. His catchphrases include 'Suit Up' and 'Legen-wait-for-it-Dary'. He is Ted's other best friend. Abandoned by his father at a young age, Barney has abandonment issues and clings to his friends. He tells extravagant lies about events in his life as a defense mechanism for his substandard childhood. He marries Robin in the penultimate episode of the series but they divorce after three years in the two-part series finale. In 2020, a failed one-night stand gives him a daughter, Ellie. Harris' husband David Burtka appeared in seven episodes as Scooter.
- Alyson Hannigan as Lily Aldrin, a kindergarten teacher, aspiring artist, and Marshall's wife. She is terrible at keeping secrets and can be manipulative at times. She marries Marshall in season 2 and gives birth to Marvin in season 7. Though appearing sweet and cute, Lily can be quite unexpectedly fierce. Her best girl friend is Robin, whom she met through Ted as he dated Robin. Hannigan's husband Alexis Denisof appeared in ten episodes as Sandy Rivers.
- Cristin Milioti as Tracy McConnell, the titular character who is Ted's future wife. She makes her first official appearance in Season 8, and gradually meets all the characters throughout Season 9 leading up to her meeting Ted. She is a musician who sings and plays bass, and shares many of Ted's hobbies and interests.

== Season synopses ==
Season	Episodes	Originally released	
Season	Episodes	First released	Last released
1	22	September 19, 2005	May 15, 2006
2	22	September 18, 2006	May 14, 2007
3	20	September 24, 2007	May 19, 2008
4	24	September 22, 2008	May 18, 2009
5	24	September 21, 2009	May 24, 2010
6	24	September 20, 2010	May 16, 2011
7	24	September 19, 2011	May 14, 2012
8	24	September 24, 2012	May 13, 2013
9	24	September 23, 2013	March 31, 2014

=== Season 1 ===
In 2030, Ted Mosby (voiced by Bob Saget) sits his children down to tell them the story of how he met their mother.

The series begins in September 2005 with Ted (Josh Radnor) as a single, 27-year-old architect living with his two best friends from his college years: Marshall Eriksen (Jason Segel), a law student, and Lily Aldrin (Alyson Hannigan), a kindergarten teacher and an aspiring artist. Lily and Marshall have been dating for almost nine years when Marshall finally proposes. Their engagement causes Ted to think about marriage and finding his soul mate, much to the disgust of his self-appointed best friend Barney Stinson (Neil Patrick Harris), whom he met in the restroom at a bar four years earlier. Barney is a serial womanizer who concocts elaborate con games, usually involving costumes and fake identities, designed to bed women, only to lose interest in them immediately afterward.

Ted begins his search for his perfect soul mate and meets an ambitious young reporter from Canada, Robin Scherbatsky (Cobie Smulders), with whom he quickly falls in love. Robin, however, does not want to rush into a relationship and the two decide to be friends. Future Ted reveals that Robin is not the mother after referring to her as "Aunt Robin".

Ted begins dating a baker, Victoria (Ashley Williams), whom he meets at Stuart and Claudia's wedding, causing Robin to become jealous, and realize she does have feelings for Ted. Victoria is offered a fellowship in pastry-making, moves to Germany and she and Ted try a long-distance relationship. Once Ted learns Robin has feelings for him, he tells her he broke up with Victoria, even though he has not. They almost have sex when Victoria calls and Robin answers, mistaking Ted's phone for her own. Ted and Victoria then break up and an angry Robin distances herself from Ted, but they eventually reconcile and decide to date.

Meanwhile, Lily begins to wonder if she has missed any opportunities because of her relationship with Marshall, and decides to pursue an art fellowship in San Francisco, breaking up with Marshall in the process. The season ends with Ted returning to the apartment, the morning after spending the night with Robin for the first time, to find Marshall sitting in the rain with Lily's engagement ring, devastated by their sudden break-up after nine years. Marshall must then call off their wedding.

The phrase olive theory is most known for its appearance in the "pilot" episode. In the scene, Ted tells the story of his first date with Robin to Lily and Marshall. Ted states that since he does not like olives but his date does, they are compatible. Lily and Marshall add on that the olive theory works in their relationship, as Marshall always gives Lily his olives. However, it is later said that Marshall only pretended not to like them to make Lily happy.

=== Season 2 ===
Ted and Robin are now a couple; meanwhile, a heartbroken Marshall tries to continue his life without Lily. After enduring numerous emotional breakdowns, Marshall's friends step in, and Barney, using sly catchphrases and pick-up lines, tries to get Marshall back in the dating game. Marshall becomes Barney's new 'wingman' as Ted is now in a relationship with Robin. Barney mentors Marshall in the art of flirting with women. Marshall fails at impressing women, but he finally obtains a barista's number. Later, Lily, after finally realizing she is not meant to be an artist, returns to New York. They remain separated as Marshall begins to date another girl, the barista whose number he earned, described by the gang as having 'crazy eyes'. The date with the girl does not end well and eventually leads to Lily and Marshall becoming reunited, and their engagement eventually resumes. When Robin refuses to go to the mall or explain why, Marshall suspects she is married, and Barney suspects she has performed in adult films. They make a slap bet on it, appointing Lily as "Slap Bet Commissioner." Lily oversees the search for the truth, as they discover that Robin was a teenage pop star named "Robin Sparkles", and Marshall eventually earns the right to slap Barney five times whenever he wishes. He uses one slap immediately and another later in the season. It is revealed that Barney has a gay African American half-brother named James (Wayne Brady) and, unaware that his mother lied to him, believes that Bob Barker is his father. As a result of this he takes a trip to California to be a contestant on The Price Is Right to meet his "father". While on the show, Barney wins all the prizes and gives them to Lily and Marshall as a 'happy early wedding' present.

In the season finale, Ted reveals to Barney that he and Robin have been broken up for some time due to their conflicting views on marriage and children. They did not tell anyone, in order to avoid taking attention away from Lily and Marshall's wedding. The season ends with Barney's excitement by the prospect of being an unfettered single man with Ted again. Barney's final words are "this is going to be legen- wait for it...".

=== Season 3 ===
Barney begins season 3 with the word, "-dary!" Robin returns from a trip to Argentina with her new boyfriend, Gael (Enrique Iglesias), and Ted must adjust to life as just her friend, while watching Robin and Gael fawning over each other. Marshall and Lily decide to move out on their own, falling in love with a place they cannot afford. Marshall is fighting his temptation to take a corporate job with high pay and focusing instead to follow his dream of becoming an environmental lawyer to protect the world from pollution. Robin learns of Lily's bad credit rating due to her compulsive shopping for designer brands, and forces Lily to tell Marshall. Despite this, they are able to finally secure their dream apartment, in Dowisetrepla, only to discover it is in a horrible location (DOwn WInd of the SEwage TREatment PLAnt) and more poorly constructed than they thought (the floor is tilted and the apartment is haunted by ghosts). Barney is slapped for the third time on Thanksgiving, which Marshall dubs "Slapsgiving."

Ted tells his children he met their mother through a story concerning her yellow umbrella. He finds the umbrella at a club and takes it home after attending a St. Patrick's Day party where his future wife was, although they did not meet. Ted attempts to woo Stella (Sarah Chalke), a dermatologist he sees to remove an embarrassing butterfly tattoo (his tramp-stamp). This culminates in a "two-minute date", which incorporates small talk, dinner, a movie (Manos, Hands of Fate), coffee, two cab rides, and a goodnight kiss. Robin sleeps with Barney after he comforts her following a break-up with a past Canadian love; Ted is infuriated, and decides to stop being friends with Barney. Meanwhile, an unknown woman begins to sabotage Barney's attempts to hook up. His saboteur is revealed to be Abby (Britney Spears), Stella's receptionist, with a vendetta against him for not calling her after they had sex.

In the season finale, Ted gets into a car accident and ends up in hospital after breaking up with Stella. Subsequently, Barney is hit by a bus while he is on his way to visit Ted and receives treatment in the same hospital. Ted realizes Barney cares about him and they renew their friendship. Barney's true feelings for Robin are revealed while Ted proposes to Stella in an arcade with a toy kangaroo.

=== Season 4 ===
Stella says yes to Ted's proposal. Robin takes a new job in Japan, but quickly resigns and returns to New York to attend Ted's wedding, after realizing how much she misses her friends. Stella leaves Ted at the altar to get back together with Tony (Jason Jones), the father of her daughter. Barney struggles with his feelings for Robin as his company shifts him to the management team of a new acquisition, Goliath National Bank (GNB), where Marshall has accepted a position as a lawyer.

Marshall and Lily move to their new apartment and debate over whether or not they are ready to have kids. Robin is threatened to be deported for not having a job in her field, which opens an opportunity for Barney to spend time with Robin. Robin gets a job as an anchor for a 4 AM news show after Barney submits her video resume, and becomes roommates with Ted. Ted and Robin decide to sleep together constantly so they will not fight over each other's bad co-living habits. Barney attempts to make them stop fighting to prevent this, revealing to Ted his love for Robin.

Ted finds out Lily has sabotaged all of his relationships with anyone she does not approve of and indirectly may have inspired his breakup with Robin. Robin and Ted end up talking about it, causing their friendship to begin moving toward a positive note. After Barney finally sleeps with his 200th woman (and rubs it in the face of the childhood bully who taunted him into pursuing it), he begins to question the purpose of the remainder of his life, leaving him more certain of his feelings for Robin. Barney secures Ted a job to design the new Goliath National Bank headquarters. When the company later suspends the project, Marshall and Barney try to hide this fact from Ted. Ted starts his own architectural design company, Mosbius Designs, after getting laid off; however, he is too afraid of failing and refuses to call clients.

Ted, while carrying the yellow umbrella, bumps into Stella and Tony. Tony later decides to visit him, sympathizing with Ted over his loss of Stella. Tony offers Ted a job as a professor of architecture at Columbia University, which Ted initially turns down.

In the season finale Robin finds out that Barney loves her, and initially refuses to commit to anything but a sex-only relationship; they seemingly end up together anyway. Ted decides that being an architect is leading nowhere, and finally decides instead to become a college professor. The finale ends with Ted preparing to teach his first class and Future Ted revealing to his children that one of the women in the class is their mother.

=== Season 5 ===
Ted begins his job as a professor of architecture, standing in the middle of a classroom – although the mother was present, it turns out to be an economics class as he's in the wrong lecture hall. Barney and Robin have had a sexual relationship throughout the summer and Lily locks them in a room, forcing them to come to terms with their relationship. After a rough patch they decide to break up. Robin describes it instead as "two friends getting back together." Barney immediately goes back to his old ways, using the playbook to score with women. Throughout the season Barney and Robin show feelings of regret over their break-up.

Ted dates a graduate student named Cindy (Rachel Bilson) and it is revealed her roommate is his future wife. Robin meets Don Frank (Benjamin Koldyke), her new co-anchor on her 4 AM TV show. Though she initially dislikes him (as seen in the rabbit or duck episode), the two start dating and eventually she moves in with him. At the end of the season they break up when Don takes a job in Chicago — a job which Robin had previously turned down to stay in New York with Don. Robin moves back into Ted's apartment. Lily's father, Mickey (Chris Elliott), who was absent during her childhood, makes an appearance at Thanksgiving. Mickey and Lily are able to mend their relationship at the end of the meal, where Marshall uses his fourth slap on Barney. Ted discovered that Tony, who stole Stella away from Ted at the altar, wrote a movie on Ted and Stella's relationship. The movie, "The Wedding Bride," portrays Tony as the hero and Ted as the villain. The movie becomes popular and Ted unexpectedly sees it while on a date with another girl. He is infuriated by how he is portrayed in the movie, and views the actual story as the complete opposite. Ted buys a house, which needs to be fixed up badly, but is later revealed to be the future home for him and his children.

Lily and Marshall are still unsure about having children. After watching four doppelgangers of their group (Lesbian Robin, Moustache Marshall, Stripper Lily and Mexican Wrestler Ted) they decide to leave the big decision to the universe's "infinite wisdom" and start trying when they have seen Barney's doppelganger.

In the season finale, Barney disguises himself to have sex with a girl from every country in the world, and Lily and Marshall mistake him for the final doppelganger. When Marshall finds out, he decides not to tell Lily, fearing she will want to wait even longer to have children. Lily eventually finds out and decides to wait. Lily thinks she sees Barney's doppelganger as a hot dog vendor, which causes the group to realize she is seeing what she wants to see, and play along. Eventually Barney agrees having babies is not a stupid idea and Lily and Marshall should go forth. The season ends with Lily asking Marshall to "put a baby in my belly".

=== Season 6 ===
In the season opening, Ted sees Cindy again with a girl who he thinks to be her roommate, but she turns out to be Cindy's girlfriend whom she later marries. After prodding by Barney, Ted is eventually hired by GNB once more as the architect of the bank's new headquarters, which was originally scrapped in Season 4. However, he encounters opposition when he meets Zoey Pierson (Jennifer Morrison), a woman who is protesting against GNB for selecting a decrepit hotel, the Arcadian, to be torn down for the headquarters. Over the season, Ted's encounters with Zoey eventually blossom into a relationship after she divorces her rich husband, the Captain (Kyle MacLachlan). However, when their relationship is challenging and turbulent, they break up, leading to Ted supporting the Arcadian's demolition.

Having agreed to conceive a baby at the end of the previous season, Lily and Marshall keep having sex, hoping she will get pregnant. Around Christmas, they have a false alarm and later seek fertility testing. The fertility specialist, Dr. Stangel, turns out to be Barney's doppelganger, fulfilling their promise with the universe in regard to their decision to have a child. However, tragedy strikes when Marshall's father passes away, leaving him devastated and the gang comforting him. Marshall tries to get over his father's death and live again. Despite a pledge to Lily to work harder for their future, Marshall resigns from GNB and follows his dream of being an environmental lawyer. Zoey also hires him as her lawyer in what became a futile battle to save the Arcadian.

Barney finally admits to the gang that Bob Barker is not his real father, especially when his mother decides to sell the house he grew up in and his brother, James, meets his own father. Loretta offers the identity of Barney's father on a sheet of paper, but Barney tears this up after realizing her efforts as a single mother. At the funeral of Marshall's father, Barney tells Loretta that he wants to see his father at last. The man, Jerry Whittaker (John Lithgow), is eventually revealed to be someone whom Barney thought was his uncle. Barney, who remembers Jerry as a fun-loving man, is disappointed after learning how Jerry has grown out of his free-wheeling ways. Although he tries to bring back Jerry's old behaviors, Barney admits that he wants to settle down someday. He is also introduced to Nora (Nazanin Boniadi), a co-worker of Robin, for whom he develops feelings. After an initial falling out, the two reconcile at the end of the season after Barney asks her for coffee.

Robin continues to work at her talk show, Come On, Get Up, New York!, but the presence of a new hyperactive co-host forces her to leave. She is accepted as a researcher in another network, World Wide News. The gang also discovers more of her past as the Canadian pop star Robin Sparkles. Robin also encounters a man (Michael Trucco) she has had a secret crush on since first seeing him when she and Ted were dating, and Future Ted hints that they will see more of him later.

In the season finale, Ted makes the decision that he wants to get back with Zoey. Robin and Barney try to stop them from getting back together. Marshall's interview goes wrong as food poisoning hits him during the meeting; Lily's similar sickness was thought to be food poisoning as well, but is revealed to be morning sickness, as she has become pregnant. Barney and Robin get closure by helping Ted not get back together with Zoey. Short scenes during the season premiere and finale feature a wedding set sometime in the future, where Ted will meet his future wife. In the final scene of the season, the groom is revealed to be Barney.

=== Season 7 ===
Season seven opens with another flash forward, in which Ted is helping Barney get ready for his wedding to a still-unknown bride. In the present, Marshall gets a job in environmental law while Lily's pregnancy progresses. Barney proves to Nora that he can be a good boyfriend to her, while Robin is revealed to still have feelings for Barney. After a court case for assault, Robin receives mandated therapy. Robin meets a therapist, Kevin (Kal Penn), and they start to date. Meanwhile, after a period of unemployment since leaving GNB, Marshall finally manages to land his dream job at a top environmental law firm. After losing a bet, Barney is forced to wear a tie with a duck pattern on it (nicknamed the 'Ducky Tie') which he hates. Marshall allows him to take it off when meeting Nora's parents on the condition that Barney has three slaps added to the one still remaining from the Slap Bet. Marshall uses two slaps immediately, leaving two left.

While reminiscing about Hurricane Irene, Lily and Marshall reveal that they conceived their baby in Barney's apartment, and Barney and Robin end up sleeping together. Barney and Robin decide to break up with their partners, but Robin cannot bring herself to break up with Kevin, leaving Barney alone and heartbroken. Robin has a pregnancy scare at Thanksgiving and tells Barney the child is his, since she and Kevin have not yet slept together. However, Robin's doctor informs her that she cannot have children at all. Kevin, who wants children, proposes to Robin, who warns him that she will never want children, and he breaks up with her. Ted comforts Robin and reveals he still loves her, but the gesture is unrequited. Eventually, she moves out to give him some space.

Marshall and Lily decide they want to move to Long Island, after Lily's paternal grandparents offer them their house there. Eventually, they move back to the old apartment in New York City after realizing suburban life is not for them. Ted gives them his apartment because he believes he cannot move on from Robin while living there, while he and Robin become estranged and do not speak for several weeks. Robin is eventually offered a news anchor job and subsequently achieves recognition after preventing a helicopter she is flying in from crashing.

Barney starts dating a stripper named Quinn (Becki Newton), to the group's initial apprehension. The gang begins to meddle in their relationship, but Barney and Quinn outsmart their attempts and win their approval. Quinn moves in with Barney, while Ted rents Quinn's old apartment. Lily goes into labor and frantically calls Barney and Marshall, who are out at a casino in Atlantic City and heavily intoxicated. Barney helps Marshall arrive in time for Lily's delivery and chooses the middle name for the baby, Marvin Waitforit Eriksen. Ted and Robin's friendship also recovers as a result of Marvin's birth. As the season concludes, Marshall and Lily begin a new family with their baby, Marvin. Barney proposes to Quinn performing an extravagant magic trick in airport security. Ted contacts his old girlfriend Victoria; unhappy with her own impending wedding, she leaves her fiancé for Ted and the pair drive off into the sunset. A final flash forward shows the day of Barney's wedding, where Robin is revealed as the bride.

=== Season 8 ===
Ted visits Robin on the day of her wedding to Barney, causing him to remember how he and Victoria ran away from her wedding to be together. The summer is spent with Ted, Barney, and Robin enjoying their current relationships; however, all subsequently break up with their partners. Barney and Quinn break up due to their inability to trust each other, Victoria splits up with Ted over his friendship with Robin, and Robin breaks up with Nick realizing his immaturity. Robin and Barney kiss but decide not to get together, despite Barney's wishes. Barney then begins dating Robin's hated co-worker Patrice (Ellen D. Williams), a relationship later exposed as a ruse to make Robin realize her true feelings for him. In a culminating scene, Barney proposes to Robin, who says yes.

Marshall and Lily attempt to get used to being parents, which causes a brief estrangement from the gang as baby Marvin takes up the majority of their time. Lily's father Mickey becomes Marvin's nanny, freeing the two up to spend more time with their friends. The Captain, ex-husband of Ted's old girlfriend Zoey, offers Lily a job as an art consultant after she identifies a painting that made a huge profit for him. Lily accepts, happy to finally achieve her dream of having a job in the art industry, while Marshall decides to apply to become a judge. The Captain offers Lily a year's work in Rome, which she accepts with Marshall's blessing. However, just before Barney and Robin's wedding, Marshall is informed that his application to become a judge has been granted, a development that would require them to stay in the US.

Ted briefly dates Jeanette (Abby Elliott), a girl who stalked him after he appeared on the cover of New York Magazine for designing GNB's headquarters. He quickly realizes he has made a mistake but decides to stay with her because he is slightly unstable, too. After they break up, Ted's feelings of loneliness grow, especially as he is now the only single member of the group, and he decides he is truly ready to settle down. He argues with Lily over hiring a DJ or a band for Barney and Robin's wedding, but is forced to provide a band at short notice when Lily concedes the argument. During a chance meeting on the subway, Cindy offers the services of her roommate's wedding band. This roommate is Ted's future wife.

As the week of the wedding approaches, Robin has doubts about marrying Barney and shares an emotional moment with Ted. Feeling guilty, Ted realizes he cannot be around Barney and Robin after they are married and decides to move to Chicago the day after the wedding. The season concludes with everyone traveling to Barney and Robin's wedding, including the mother of Ted's children (revealed on screen for the first time and portrayed by Cristin Milioti), who is seen buying a train ticket to the venue and holding her yellow umbrella.

=== Season 9 ===
With the exceptions of the series' 200th episode and the last episode, the entirety of season nine takes place in the 56 hours leading up to Barney and Robin's wedding.

Marshall, who is stuck in Minnesota, desperately tries to find a way to get to the wedding in time. Meanwhile, in Farhampton, the time is slowly counting down to the wedding, with a new problem arising in almost every episode. It is revealed that Lily is pregnant and that she and Marshall will have a daughter. It is also revealed that Ted's children are named Penny and Luke. In the 200th episode, the Mother's eight years before meeting Ted are revealed, while later episodes give viewers a glimpse of Ted and the Mother together in flash forward scenes. Also, Marshall uses his final two slaps from the slap bet: the first being used as an apology present for missing the rehearsal dinner, and the second when Barney begins to panic just before the beginning of the wedding ceremony.

In the series finale, it is revealed that after three years of marriage, Barney and Robin decided to divorce. Barney ends up later fathering a child during a one-night stand. Marshall eventually becomes a judge, and he and Lily have three children. Ted's wife, whose name is revealed to be Tracy McConnell, dies of an unknown illness in 2024, six years prior to the time of Ted telling his children the full story of how they met. Upon finishing the story, at the urging of his kids, Ted decides to ask Robin out. Alluding to the first episode, the finale ends with Robin, as she looks out of her apartment window to see Ted holding the blue French horn, smiling with tears in her eyes.

Following backlash from fans over the ending of the series, an alternative ending was cut together and released on the Season 9 DVD, in which future Ted narrates over the scene in which Ted and Tracy meet at the train station, recapping all major events from the series. He delivers the final line "and that kids is how I met your mother", and the episode ends, completely cutting the final scene with Penny and Luke.

== Critical reception ==
The first season was met with generally favorable reviews from critics, although some compared the series unfavorably to Friends. On Metacritic, a review aggregation site that collected 25 reviews for the series, it scored a 69 out of 100. Michael Abernethy of PopMatters gave the season a negative review, writing that "The comedy that does occur in How I Met Your Mother isn't enough to compensate for its inconsistencies." Tom Shales of The Washington Post gave the season a lukewarm review, saying it's "a little better than most other sitcoms, past and present -- especially those featuring wacky urban friends in their twenties experiencing the bittersweet mysteries of life." Melanie Macfarlane of the Seattle Post-Intelligencer gave the season a positive review, saying the show "may not break any comedic ground, but it's the sort of comfortable, reliable hitter CBS needs on Monday nights."

The second season received critical acclaim. Staci Krause of IGN gave the season a positive review, calling it "groundbreaking".

The third season was met with mostly positive reviews. Michelle Zoromski of IGN gave the season a positive review, saying that "the season was fun and clever, a good, consistent flow from the first two seasons".

The fourth season received critical acclaim. Michelle Zoromski of IGN gave Season 4 an overall rating of 8.5 out of 10, stating that "This fourth season seemed to settle down the chase for the titular mother. While Ted was busy dating Stella, the gang settled into many stand alone episodes which were every bit as entertaining as episodes devoted to Ted's love life". Zoromski went on to say: "A stellar Robin-Marshall episode, titled 'Little Minnesota', makes it clear that these two do not get enough screen time together. With Robin homesick and unemployed (and at risk of being deported), this pairing brought out the best Robin Sparkles reference of the season, when Marshall leads a rousing karaoke version of 'Let's Go to the Mall!'"

The fifth season received mixed reviews. Cindy McLennan of Television Without Pity gave the season a mixed review, and at the end of the season wrote: "I'm okay with any given season not being primarily focused on mother-meeting, but this season, the characters seemed to regress -- particularly Barney and Ted. Usually, when a season ends, I have to deal with a week or two weeks' worth of letdown. Right now, all I'm feeling is relief."

The sixth season received generally positive reviews. Justin Fowler of Late Reviews gave the season a positive review, saying that the season was "a pretty good season of television" and better than the "poor" fifth season. He also said that "Seventeen out of the 24 episodes are what I would consider good".

The seventh season received mixed reviews. Alan Sepinwall gave the season a mixed review and criticized the flash-forwards throughout the season, saying that "the show is just much, much stronger when its stories dwell on matters of the present or the past, and where the writers don't have to act like magicians trying to keep the audience from figuring out how the trick works. And the finale affirmed that belief for me. The parts that had little or nothing to do with things to come were quite good; the parts that were all about the future made me roll my eyes and ask, for the umpteenth time, 'Really? This is where you're going with this?'"

The eighth season received mixed reviews and is often considered the worst season of the series. Rotten Tomatoes reported that 54% of critics gave the show a positive review. The consensus reads: "How I Met Your Mother wears out its welcome this season, with an anticlimactic reveal and rote, less-than-fruitful humor."

The ninth season received mixed-to-positive reviews from critics, though fans found it worse than prior seasons. Rotten Tomatoes reported that 80% of critics gave the show a positive review, with an average rating of 7.3 out of 10. Gareth Mitchell at "House of Geekery" responded negatively, mostly criticizing the structure of the season, stating that they are "struggling to come up with stories that last out the 22 minutes".

The finale of the show received a largely negative reaction from critics and fans. Some complained that the last few seasons (particularly the final season before the finale which took place over one weekend) had built towards an end game that was discarded during the final hour-long episode, while others defended it as true to both the initial concept of the show and to life itself. In the years succeeding its airing, it continued to be singled out as one of the worst television series finales, e.g., topping USA Today's list of "Worst Series Finales of All Time".

== Subplots ==
=== The Slap Bet ===
It is in Season 2, episode 9, named "Slap Bet" when viewers are introduced to what is a slap bet, as explained by Marshall to Lily. The first slap bet of the series is made in this episode when Ted is adamant on discovering why Robin refuses to go to malls. In response Barney is positive that Robin is hiding pornography that she has starred in, while Marshall believes Robin is married. This is when Barney suggests a slap bet instead of betting money, Marshall explains that "whoever is right gets to slap the other person in the face as hard as they can -- but no rings". Lily initially believes it is immature until Marshall states she can be slap bet commissioner. Ted continues to badger Robin about why she refuses to go to malls, and when trying to figure out if she was married, Robin lies and says she was married. When Ted tells the group that Robin is married, Marshall preemptively slaps Barney. Marshall then tries to look up Robin's marital records at his law school library, and it is revealed that Robin lied. Eventually Marshall tells Lily, so Lily as slap bet commissioner imparts a slap penalty allowing Barney to slap Marshall three times, one for lying about finding out the truth and two for the premature slap. Barney then discovers someone that has the tape with proof of Robin's secret, a man in Malaysia, and he has posted the video onto MySpace. When Barney plays the video, he stops the video at a seemingly suggestive part and believing he has won the bet he slaps Marshall. Robin, to show that her secret was not pornography, then plays the entire video, revealing to the group that she was Robin Sparkles, a teenage pop star in Canada. Viewers and the group are introduced to Robin's song "Let's Go to the Mall". Lily allows Barney to choose between two punishments, ten slaps at that moment or five slaps that be doled out any time from then to eternity. Although Ted states that Barney should just take the ten slaps, Barney chooses the five slaps. When Ted apologizes for forcing the secret out of her, Robin tells Ted that she is glad he knows her better and they kiss, Marshall then slaps Barney, using his first slap stating "That's one". The slaps won by Marshall are an ongoing trope within the series and last through to the twenty second episode of season 9 "The End of the Aisle", the last episode before the two-episode series finale "Last Forever".

=== The Pineapple Incident ===
Introduced in The Pineapple Incident (Season 1, Episode 10), this mystery begins when Ted wakes up after a drunken night with a woman in his bed, a sprained ankle, and a pineapple on his nightstand. The gang tries to piece together the events of the night, but the origin of the pineapple remains unknown as they eat the pineapple in the end of the episode. It is later revealed in a deleted scene from Daisy (Season 9, Episode 20) that the pineapple came from the Captain’s home, as part of a naval tradition.

=== Robin Sparkles ===
First revealed in Slap Bet (Season 2, Episode 9), Robin’s secret past as a Canadian teen pop star emerges when Barney and Ted try to uncover her biggest secret. Over multiple episodes, more details surface, including her second song, "Sandcastles in the Sand" in Sandcastles in the Sand (Season 3, Episode 16) which sets off Barney and Robin's relationship, and her dark post-pop phase with "P.S. I Love You" in P.S. I Love You (Season 8, Episode 15) when Barney is in search for it and seems to become "obsessed" over it. In a deleted scene from The End of the Aisle (Season 9, Episode 22), Robin sings "Let's Go to the Mall" for the gang at her wedding reception, with Ted, Marshall, Lily, and Barney joining in.

=== The Doppelgängers ===
First introduced in Double Date (Season 5, Episode 2), the gang begins spotting doppelgängers of themselves:

- Lesbian Robin is the first to be found.
- Moustache Marshall is spotted in Double Date (Season 5, Episode 2), and seen again when Ted goes on a date with Jen after seven years in Double Date (Season 5, Episode 2)
- Stripper Lily appears in Double Date (Season 5, Episode 2).
- Mexican Wrestler Ted is seen in Robots Versus Wrestlers (Season 5, Episode 22).
- Doctor Stangel is (not) discovered in Doppelgangers (Season 5, Episode 24), but it leads Marshall and Lily to believe it's a sign to start a family. However, it turns out to actually be Barney in disguise. The real doppelgänger is finally spotted in Big Days (Season 6, Episode 1).

=== The Playbook ===
Introduced in The Playbook (Season 5, Episode 8), Barney reveals a book containing elaborate pick-up schemes. The book becomes a recurring element in the series, with Barney frequently using its strategies. It plays a major role in The Final Page – Part 2 (Season 8, Episode 12), where Barney burns it as part of an elaborate final play to propose to Robin.

=== Marshall vs. Machines ===
First heard in Subway Wars (Season 6, Episode 4), Marshall develops a fear of technology because he thought he could not get Lily pregnant and it was his fault. The theme motif is teased in Bedtime Stories (Season 9, Episode 12) at the end of the episode, and a second rendition of the song is heard in Bass Player Wanted (Season 9, Episode 13).

=== The Locket ===
These actions unfold in Something Old (Season 8, Episode 23) and Something New (Season 8, Episode 24)

A while back, Robin had buried her locket in a park, believing it was her "something old" for her wedding. It later becomes a symbol for Ted's unresolved feelings for her.

Right before Ted is supposed to marry Stella, it is shown that a distraught, drunk Robin had already dug the locket up, and Lily has placed it in Ted's childhood racecar pencil box.

As the wedding unfolds, Robin tries finding the locket but fails. Robin and Ted are seen holding hands in the same park where Robin spent the day searching for her locket as it rains, while Barney, in the background, jealously watches. Ted later tracks down the locket, that was with Victoria, his ex-girlfriend, in LA, and later was thrown into the river by his ex-girlfriend Jeanette. In Sunrise (Season 9, Episode 17) Ted dives into the river, retrieving the locket. In The End of the Aisle (Season 9, Episode 22), Robin finds out that Ted had jumped in the river.

On the day before the wedding, Ted gives the locket to Barney to give to Robin, but Robin figures out that Ted had found the locket. Believing that the universe is sending her a sign, she briefly considers running away with Ted. Ted refuses to let Robin run away and guides her back to Barney. Barney then finds Robin having a panic attack, but calms her down by making a vow to never lie again.

== Tie-ins ==
=== Books ===
- The Bro Code, cited by Barney many times throughout the series, is a set of written rules for bros to follow, and has been published as a tie-in novel, an audiobook, an iPhone Application and an Android Application. Barney alleges it was written by Barnabus Stinson, a contemporary of George Washington and Benjamin Franklin. Many of the rules listed in this book also appear in the show's closing vanity cards in syndication.
- Bro on the Go, a companion to The Bro Code, released in 2009.
- Bro Code for Parents: What to Expect When You're Awesome, released in 2012.
- The Playbook, based on the fifth season episode of the same name, by Barney Stinson and Matt Kuhn.
- How I Met Your Mother and Philosophy, released in 2013.

=== Podcast ===
- In addition to the television series, How I Met Your Mother has inspired various discussions and analyses through podcasts. Several fan-driven and one official podcast called How We Made Your Mother delve into the show's themes, characters, and cultural impact. Some explore the intricate storytelling and the long-running mystery of the mother’s identity, while others focus on the humor and life lessons embedded in the series. Notable podcast episodes have featured interviews with cast members, writers, and creators, offering behind-the-scenes insights into how the show was made.

=== Music volume ===
- The music of How I Met Your Mother played a crucial role in setting the tone for the series. From original songs performed by the characters to carefully curated indie and pop tracks, the show's soundtrack helped define key moments.
- The series featured memorable original songs such as "Let's Go to the Mall" by Robin Sparkles and "Nothing Suits Me Like a Suit" performed by Barney Stinson.
- Additionally, licensed music selections, including "Downtown Train" by Everything But The Girl, "Simple Song" by The Shins and "The Funeral" by Band of Horses, played during pivotal emotional moments. During the teaser scenes from the Series 5 Finale involving the Barney wedding, George Harrison’s "Ballad of Sir Frankie Crisp (Let It Roll)" was used, and during the scene where Barney teaches the Playbook to two wayward college kids in Series 9, The Bangles’ "Eternal Flame" plays. Comedically, in season 7, the song "Burnin' for You" by Blue Öyster Cult is playing when a character has accidentally been set on fire.
- Two official soundtrack albums, How I Met Your Music and How I Met Your Music: Volume 2, were released, featuring some of the most iconic songs from the show.
- The show's creators, Carter Bays and Craig Thomas, were heavily involved in selecting music as stated in many interviews. This attention to detail helped cement the show's status as a series with a strong musical identity.
- A 12-second clip from the song "Hey, Beautiful" by The Solids is the theme song for the show, which was created by band members Bays and Thomas.

=== Soundtracks ===
- A soundtrack album entitled How I Met Your Music: Original Songs from the Hit Series was released digitally to iTunes on September 24, 2012, featuring songs from the first seven seasons
- A second soundtrack album entitled How I Met Your Music: Deluxe was released digitally to iTunes on September 23, 2014, featuring songs from the final two seasons.

=== Pineapple Incident explained ===
After the end of the series, the officials released a short video, explaining the running mystery of the pineapple in "The Pineapple Incident", the tenth episode of the first season. The extra footage revealed that a character featured in the 6th season, the Captain (Kyle MacLachlan), had put a pineapple in front of his door as a tradition and Ted took the pineapple while he was drunk.

=== Websites ===
Websites were consistently mentioned throughout the How I Met Your Mother series. Many of the websites directly tie in to running gags on the show. CBS turned nearly every website mentioned in the series into a real functioning website. Since the show's ending in 2014, a majority of the websites remain active.

- The first Instance of a website tie-in on How I Met Your Mother was on Season 3, Episode 14 'The Bracket' with one of Barney's one-night-stands creating both http://tedmosbyisajerk.com and http://tedmosbyisnotajerk.com.
- In Season 3, Episode 19, 'Everything Must Go', Lily is forced to sell her clothes on the internet because she is in serious credit card debt. She jokes they should call the website http://www.guyforceshiswifetodressinagarbagebagforthenextthreeyears.com.
- Goliath National Bank (GNB) is first introduced in Season 4, Episode 2 'The Best Burger in New York' and is consistently mentioned throughout the show's run. Barney Stinson, Marshall Eriksen, and Ted Mosby have all worked for GNB. Goliath National Bank - Your Financial Wingman.
- In Season 4, Episode 7 'Not a Father's Day' as a form of celebration, Barney Stinson creates a fake holiday called "Not a Father's Day" as well as a subsequent website to promote it: http://www.notafathersday.com.
- In Season 4, Episode 14 'The Possimpible', Ted Mosby's alter-ego Doctor X was introduced. The episode explained Doctor X's origins and shared his website: http://mysteriousdrx.com.
- In Season 4, Episode 14 'The Possimpible', Robin Sherbatsky is facing deportation due to unemployment, and so Barney attempts to help her by sharing his video resume website: http://www.barneysvideoresume.com.
- In Season 4, Episode 18 'Old King Clancy', the gang is attempting to guess facts about Robin's sexual history with the help of http://canadiansexacts.org. This website is now inactive.
- In Season 5, Episode 4 'The Sexless Innkeeper', Marshall Eriksen creates http://www.itwasthebestnightever.com to celebrate "the best night ever".
- In Season 5, Episode 8 'The Playbook', Barney Stinson creates http://www.extremitiesquarterly.com, http://balloonexplorersclub.com, http://www.lorenzovonmatterhorn.com, and http://bigbusinessjournal.com to solidify his fake identity as Lorenzo von Matterhorn as a part of a play in "The Playbook".
- In Season 5, Episode 23 'The Wedding Bride', Ted Mosby's ex-finance Stella's new husband releases a successful movie about Ted and Stella's relationship. The website http://www.weddingbridemovie.com was created to promote the fictional movie.
- In Season 6, Episode 4 'Subway Wars', Ted uses http://grademyteacher.net to see what his college students are writing about him as a professor.
- In Season 7, Episode 4 'Stinson Missile Crisis', Barney creates two websites: http://www.stinsonbreastreduction.com and http://www.linsonbreastlawsuit.com as part of a play in "The Playbook".
- In Season 7, Episode 9 'Disaster Averted', Marshall creates the countdown website: http://www.theslapbetcountdown.com to warn Barney of his next slap as a part of their "Slap Bet", which was created five seasons earlier.
- In Season 7, Episode 13 'Tailgate', Barney and Ted start a bar titled Puzzles and use http://www.puzzlesthebar.com to promote the bar.
- In Season 7, Episode 23 'The Magician's Code (Part 1)' Ted creates http://www.lilysinlabor.com to announce that Lily is in labor.
- In Season 8, Episode 3 'Nannies' Marshall and Lily use http://www.heynannynanny.com to find a nanny.
- In Season 8, Episode 9 'Lobster Crawl' Barney starts a new business called "Bro Bibs" and uses the website http://www.brobibs.com to sell his product. Barney's company is challenged by the competing brand http://www.dudeaprons.com.

=== Spin-offs ===
==== How I Met Your Dad ====
On November 15, 2013, it was announced that CBS and the series' producer 20th Television would launch How I Met Your Dad, a woman-centric variation executive-produced by Bays, Thomas, and Emily Spivey. The new series would possibly have featured a new bar and would not have tied into the original series. The primary cast of the series was revealed on March 14, 2014, to be Greta Gerwig, Drew Tarver, Nicholas D'Agosto, Krysta Rodriguez and Andrew Santino. Tiya Sircar was cast not long after on March 26, 2014, replacing Krysta Rodriguez's role in the series. On April 23, 2014, Meg Ryan was announced to voice future Sally.

On May 14, 2014, CBS passed on picking up How I Met Your Dad since show creators Craig Thomas and Carter Bays did not want to reshoot the pilot. Nina Tassler, the entertainment president at CBS, stated that "there were elements of the pilot that didn't work out". Talks of the series being "shopped" to other networks emerged. Netflix, FOX and NBC were named as possible candidates for picking up the show.

Ultimately, nothing came of those talks. It was reported that the options on the cast contracts had expired and they had been released from their contracts and co-creator Carter Bays denied any rumors that the spin-off pilot will be reshot. On July 11, 2014, Bays confirmed that the spin-off project was officially dead. Six days later, Nina Tassler said that CBS would "love the opportunity to take another shot" at the pilot and that she would continue to "hound" Carter Bays and Craig Thomas, even though they shot down the idea of a new version of the project stating that they had both moved on.

In 2016, two years after the project was announced "dead", a full script of the pilot episode was leaked online. In 2020, the full pilot episode was also leaked by a Reddit user on the How I Met Your Mother subreddit, which included a modified ending compared to the leaked script from 2016.

==== How I Met Your Father ====
On December 14, 2016, it was reported that Isaac Aptaker and Elizabeth Berger were set to write a new version of the previous spin-off's pilot, re-titled How I Met Your Father, with Bays and Thomas serving as executive producers. On March 6, 2017, it was announced that following signing new contracts with 20th Television that would see both Aptaker and Berger being promoted to executive producers and co-showrunners on This Is Us alongside Dan Fogelman, their completed spec script for How I Met Your Father would be placed on the back burner in light of their new duties.

On August 8, 2017, Fox chairman Dana Walden told Deadline that the studio was set to try a third attempt at a spin-off with different writers due to the unavailability of Aptaker and Berger. It was also stated that all ideas from the previous two attempts are not carried over and the new attempt are created from scratch. On August 11, 2017, Deadline reported that Alison Bennett had been selected to write the spin-off. It was also confirmed that this incarnation would be developed under the title used for the Aptaker and Berger project, and that Bays and Thomas are once again attached as executive producers.

On April 21, 2021, it was announced that the spin-off series was ordered by Hulu, with Hilary Duff attached to play lead character Sophie. Aptaker and Berger would helm the project as creators, writers, and executive producers. On June 16, 2021, Chris Lowell was announced to have joined the cast in a starring role. On August 10, 2021, Francia Raisa, Tom Ainsley, Tien Tran and Suraj Sharma joined the cast in starring roles. On August 30, 2021, Daniel Augustin joined the cast in a recurring role, replacing Brandon Micheal Hall, who exited the project due to scheduling conflicts.

On January 18, 2022, How I Met Your Father began streaming on Hulu in the US, Disney+ internationally and Star+ in Latin America.

In September 2023, the show was cancelled after 2 seasons.

== Nielsen ratings ==
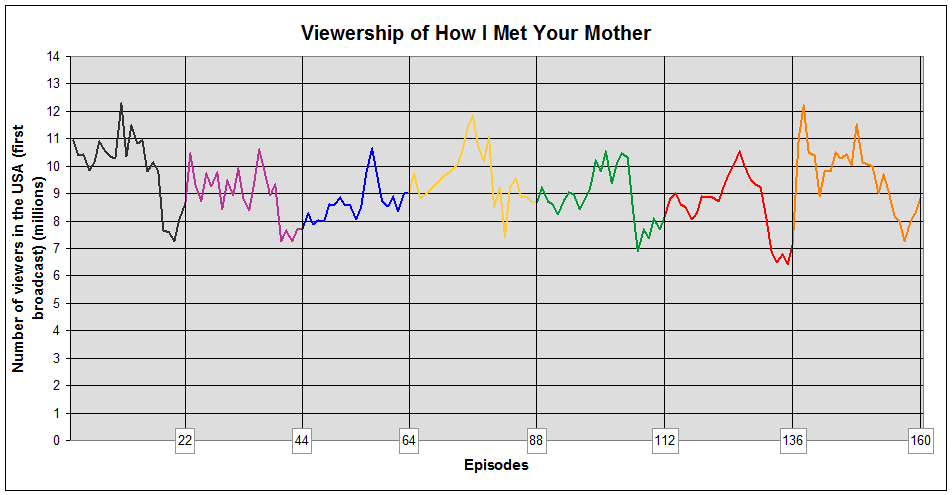
Viewership represented in a line graph

The show's highest viewed episode was the series finale, "Last Forever", watched by 13.13 million viewers. Previously, the most viewed episode was the season 1 episode "The Pineapple Incident", watched by 12.3 million viewers. The lowest-viewed episode was the season 6 episode "Landmarks", watched by 6.4 million viewers, approximately 52% of the show's previous series high, and approximately 49% of the show's finale viewership.

Season nine was the highest watched season overall and among the 18–49 adults, scoring a 4.5 rating in that sector up from the second-highest rating of 4.1 in season seven.

Viewership and ratings per season of How I Met Your Mother
Season	Timeslot (ET)	Episodes	First aired		Last aired		TV season	Viewership rank	Avg. viewers (millions)
Season	Timeslot (ET)	Episodes	Date	Viewers (millions)	Date	Viewers (millions)	TV season	Viewership rank	Avg. viewers (millions)
1	Monday 8:30 pm	22	September 19, 2005	10.94	May 15, 2006	8.64	2005–06	54	9.47
2	Monday 8:30 pm (1–3); Monday 8:00 pm (4–22)	22	September 18, 2006	10.48	May 14, 2007	9.90	2006–07	61	8.94
3	Monday 8:00 pm (1–11); Monday 8:30 pm (12–20)	20	September 24, 2007	8.12	May 19, 2008	7.99	2007–08	70	8.21
4	Monday 8:30 pm	24	September 22, 2008	9.79	May 18, 2009	8.73	2008–09	49	9.42
5	Monday 8:00 pm	24	September 21, 2009	9.09	May 24, 2010	8.06	2009–10	42	8.60
6	Monday 8:00 pm	24	September 20, 2010	8.79	May 16, 2011	7.15	2010–11	48	8.79
7	Monday 8:00 pm	24	September 19, 2011	11.00	May 14, 2012	8.58	2011–12	45	9.67
8	Monday 8:00 pm	24	September 24, 2012	8.84	May 13, 2013	8.57	2012–13	42	9.02
9	Monday 8:00 pm	24	September 23, 2013	9.40	March 31, 2014	13.13	2013–14	28	10.51

== Awards and nominations ==
The show has been nominated for 72 awards, winning 18. The show has been nominated for 28 Emmy Awards, including a nomination for Outstanding Comedy Series. Stars Alyson Hannigan and Neil Patrick Harris have each received acting accolades, with both winning People's Choice Awards, and Harris receiving Emmy and Golden Globe nominations. In 2012, seven years after its premiere, the series won the People's Choice for Favorite Network TV Comedy. The show's art direction, editing and cinematography have also been awarded.

== Home media ==
DVD season	Release dates			Episodes	Additional information
DVD season	Region 1	Region 2	Region 4	Episodes	Additional information
Season 1	November 21, 2006	May 7, 2007	January 10, 2007	22	Includes: commentaries on six episodes; a video yearbook; 2 music videos ("First Round" and "Last Call"); a gag reel; Episodes have been cropped from the broadcast widescreen to a full frame 4:3 format
Season 2	October 2, 2007	February 8, 2010	April 8, 2008	22	Includes: commentaries on seven episodes; How We Make Your Mother; 2 music videos ("Let's Go To The Mall" and "Hey Beautiful"); 3 "How It Really Happened" scenes; a gag reel; an Easter Egg.
The Legendary Season 3	October 7, 2008	May 10, 2010	February 11, 2009	20	Includes: commentaries on 7 episodes; a series retrospective; Lily & Marshall's honeymoon videos; cast favorites; a behind the scenes of "We're Not From Here"; 6 "How It Really Happened" scenes; 2 music videos ("You Just Got Slapped" and "Sandcastles in the Sand"); "Ted Mosby Is A Jerk" audio track; a gag reel.
The Awesome Season 4	September 29, 2009	July 19, 2010	October 27, 2009	24	Includes: commentaries on 4 episodes; A Night With Your Mother: Academy of Television Arts & Sciences Panel Discussion; season recap; Eriksen's Fight Club; a music video ("That Guy's Awesome"); a gag reel; Also available on Blu-ray, and is the only season to have a subsequent Blu-ray release.
The Complete Season 5. The Suited-Up Edition	September 21, 2010	November 8, 2010	October 27, 2010	24	Includes: a gag reel; music videos for "Super Date", "Nothing Suits Me Like a Suit", and "Best Night Ever"; 2 behind the scenes features; making of "Super Date"; behind the scenes of the 100th episode; an extended version of the "Wedding Bride" trailer; a musical series recap.
The Complete Season 6. The New Is Always Better Edition	September 27, 2011	October 3, 2011	October 5, 2011	24	Includes: a gag reel; making of "Subway Wars"; behind the scenes of "Glitter"; commentaries on 3 episodes; an extended performance of "Stand By Me"; a season recap
The Complete Season 7. The Ducky Tie Edition	October 2, 2012	October 15, 2012	October 10, 2012	24	Includes: a gag reel; 2 behind the scenes featurettes; deleted scenes; audio commentaries on 3 episodes; a feature on Neil Patrick Harris' Hollywood Walk of Fame star.
The Complete Season 8. The Yellow Umbrella Edition	October 1, 2013	September 30, 2013	November 9, 2013	24	Includes: deleted scenes; audio commentary on "Farmhampton" and "The Final Page"; music video for "PS I Love You"; making of "PS I Love You"; Where We Make Your Mother: Set Tour; a gag reel.
The 9th and Legendary Final Season. The Rest of Your Life Edition	September 23, 2014	October 13, 2014	October 22, 2014	24	Includes: Deleted Scenes; Audio Commentary on "The Locket"; Audio Commentary on "The Rehearsal Dinner"; Audio Commentary on "How Your Mother Met Me"; Last Forever Alternate Ending; How It All Ends; Cristin Milioti Audition; Behind the Scenes of "Gary Blauman"; Gag Reel
The Whole Story Seasons 1–9	September 23, 2014	October 13, 2014	October 22, 2014	208	Includes: All Out of Spoilers: Looking Back at Your Mother – A Retrospective; Table Read of the Series Finale with the Entire Cast; The Secret of the Pineapple Incident Revealed; Meeting the Mother; How I Met Your Mother at Comic-Con 2013–2014; The Mosby Kids: 8 Years on the Couch; How We Filmed the Kids; Plus All the Special Features from Every Previous Season

Seasons 1 through 9 were available to stream on Netflix in Austria, Canada, Finland, France, Germany, Ireland, Israel, Italy, Latin America, Lebanon, Turkey, Spain, Sweden, the Philippines, Romania, Russia, and the UK; season 9 was released on September 26, 2014. But they were ultimately pulled and relocated to Disney+. Seasons 1–9 were removed from Netflix in the United States as of November 13, 2017 and are now available on Hulu. As of March 2020, Seasons 1 through 9 are available on Amazon Prime Video in Brazil. Seasons 1 through 9 are available to stream on Hotstar in India. As of December 31, 2020, seasons 1–9 are removed from Netflix in The Netherlands. Seasons 1 to 9 were Previously available on Netflix, Stan and Star on Disney+ in Australia. However, Disney has pulled the show from both Stan and Netflix making Disney+ the only streaming service in Australia for the show. All nine seasons are available to stream on Hulu and Amazon Prime Video in the US. Repeats in Australia are often shown on 7flix and on 7plus and are shown on Fox Comedy.

- Note: The whole story DVD had a different package in Region 1 as opposed to Region 2 + 4.
