= List of How I Met Your Mother episodes =

Episodes of American television series

Logo for series

How I Met Your Mother is an American sitcom which ran for nine seasons on CBS from 2005 through 2014. It was created by Carter Bays and Craig Thomas. Set in New York City, the series follows the social and romantic lives of Ted Mosby (Josh Radnor) and his four best friends, Marshall Eriksen (Jason Segel), Robin Scherbatsky (Cobie Smulders), Lily Aldrin (Alyson Hannigan), and Barney Stinson (Neil Patrick Harris), as Ted seeks out his future wife. The titular mother is unseen until the season eight finale, "Something New", in which she is portrayed by Cristin Milioti. Milioti was promoted to series regular for the ninth season. The show tells this story through the framing device of "future" Ted (Bob Saget) as an unreliable narrator who is recounting to his son and daughter the events that led him to their mother.

Over the course of the series, 208 episodes aired. The series premiere aired on September 19, 2005, with the season one finale airing on May 15, 2006. Season two was broadcast from September 18, through May 14, 2007. The third season aired from September 24 through May 19, 2008. The series was renewed for a fourth season on May 14, 2008. Season four aired September 22, through May 18, 2009. On May 19, a fifth season, which was mandated by a syndication deal, was ordered; it ran from September 21, through May 24, 2010. In January 2010, the series was given an early renewal. Season six began on September 20 and finished on May 16, 2011. On May 7, the seventh and eighth seasons were ordered, with the series being renewed through the 2012–2013 television season. Season seven ran from September 19 through May 14, 2012. The eighth season premiered on September 24 and concluded on May 13, 2013. During the eighth season, Segal stated that he planned to depart the series when his contract expired at the end of the season. As a result, the fate of the series was unknown. However, in late January 2013, a ninth and final season was officially ordered by CBS with Segel remaining on board. The ninth season began on September 23 with the series finale airing on March 31, 2014.

How I Met Your Mother premiered to 10.94 million viewers, peaking with 12.3 million viewers for season one's tenth episode, "The Pineapple Incident". The record set by "The Pineapple Incident" was not broken until the series finale aired to a series high of 13.13 million viewers. The first few seasons maintained generally steady though declining viewership. However, its audience grew starting with season four. The first season averaged 9.5 million viewers, in comparison, the final season averaged 10.5 million. Having a larger audience at the conclusion of a series compared to the start is fairly uncommon for long running television shows. In 2014, due to the success of the series, a pilot for a spinoff starring Greta Gerwig, titled "How I Met Your Dad", was produced but not picked up. In 2022, a series titled How I Met Your Father premiered on Hulu. It starred Hilary Duff and was cancelled after two seasons.

== Series overview ==
| Season | Episodes | Originally released | |
| Season | Episodes | First released | Last released |
|---|---|---|---|
| 1 | 22 | September 19, 2005 | May 15, 2006 |
| 2 | 22 | September 18, 2006 | May 14, 2007 |
| 3 | 20 | September 24, 2007 | May 19, 2008 |
| 4 | 24 | September 22, 2008 | May 18, 2009 |
| 5 | 24 | September 21, 2009 | May 24, 2010 |
| 6 | 24 | September 20, 2010 | May 16, 2011 |
| 7 | 24 | September 19, 2011 | May 14, 2012 |
| 8 | 24 | September 24, 2012 | May 13, 2013 |
| 9 | 24 | September 23, 2013 | March 31, 2014 |

== Episodes ==
=== Season 1 (2005–06) ===
Season one episodes
| No. overall | No. in season | Title | Directed by | Written by | Original release date | Prod. code | US viewers (millions) |
|---|---|---|---|---|---|---|---|
| 1 | 1 | "Pilot" | Pamela Fryman | Carter Bays & Craig Thomas | September 19, 2005 | 1ALH79 | 10.94 |
| 2 | 2 | "Purple Giraffe" | Pamela Fryman | Carter Bays & Craig Thomas | September 26, 2005 | 1ALH01 | 10.40 |
| 3 | 3 | "Sweet Taste of Liberty" | Pamela Fryman | Phil Lord & Chris Miller | October 3, 2005 | 1ALH02 | 10.44 |
| 4 | 4 | "Return of the Shirt" | Pamela Fryman | Kourtney Kang | October 10, 2005 | 1ALH03 | 9.84 |
| 5 | 5 | "Okay Awesome" | Pamela Fryman | Chris Harris | October 17, 2005 | 1ALH04 | 10.14 |
| 6 | 6 | "Slutty Pumpkin" | Pamela Fryman | Brenda Hsueh | October 24, 2005 | 1ALH05 | 10.89 |
| 7 | 7 | "Matchmaker" | Pamela Fryman | Chris Marcil & Sam Johnson | November 7, 2005 | 1ALH07 | 10.55 |
| 8 | 8 | "The Duel" | Pamela Fryman | Gloria Calderón Kellett | November 14, 2005 | 1ALH06 | 10.35 |
| 9 | 9 | "Belly Full of Turkey" | Pamela Fryman | Phil Lord & Chris Miller | November 21, 2005 | 1ALH09 | 10.29 |
| 10 | 10 | "The Pineapple Incident" | Pamela Fryman | Carter Bays & Craig Thomas | November 28, 2005 | 1ALH08 | 12.27 |
| 11 | 11 | "The Limo" | Pamela Fryman | Sam Johnson & Chris Marcil | December 19, 2005 | 1ALH10 | 10.36 |
| 12 | 12 | "The Wedding" | Pamela Fryman | Kourtney Kang | January 9, 2006 | 1ALH11 | 11.49 |
| 13 | 13 | "Drumroll, Please" | Pamela Fryman | Gloria Calderón Kellett | January 23, 2006 | 1ALH12 | 10.82 |
| 14 | 14 | "Zip, Zip, Zip" | Pamela Fryman | Brenda Hsueh | February 6, 2006 | 1ALH13 | 10.94 |
| 15 | 15 | "Game Night" | Pamela Fryman | Chris Harris | February 27, 2006 | 1ALH14 | 9.82 |
| 16 | 16 | "Cupcake" | Pamela Fryman | Maria Ferrari | March 6, 2006 | 1ALH15 | 10.15 |
| 17 | 17 | "Life Among the Gorillas" | Pamela Fryman | Carter Bays & Craig Thomas | March 20, 2006 | 1ALH16 | 9.80 |
| 18 | 18 | "Nothing Good Happens After 2 A.M." | Pamela Fryman | Carter Bays & Craig Thomas | April 10, 2006 | 1ALH17 | 7.65 |
| 19 | 19 | "Mary the Paralegal" | Pamela Fryman | Chris Harris | April 24, 2006 | 1ALH18 | 7.60 |
| 20 | 20 | "Best Prom Ever" | Pamela Fryman | Ira Ungerleider | May 1, 2006 | 1ALH19 | 7.24 |
| 21 | 21 | "Milk" | Pamela Fryman | Carter Bays & Craig Thomas | May 8, 2006 | 1ALH20 | 8.07 |
| 22 | 22 | "Come On" | Pamela Fryman | Carter Bays & Craig Thomas | May 15, 2006 | 1ALH21 | 8.64 |

=== Season 2 (2006–07) ===
Season two episodes
| No. overall | No. in season | Title | Directed by | Written by | Original release date | Prod. code | US viewers (millions) |
|---|---|---|---|---|---|---|---|
| 23 | 1 | "Where Were We?" | Pamela Fryman | Carter Bays & Craig Thomas | September 18, 2006 | 2ALH01 | 10.48 |
| 24 | 2 | "The Scorpion and the Toad" | Rob Greenberg | Chris Harris | September 25, 2006 | 2ALH02 | 9.14 |
| 25 | 3 | "Brunch" | Pamela Fryman | Stephen Lloyd | October 2, 2006 | 2ALH03 | 9.32 |
| 26 | 4 | "Ted Mosby, Architect" | Pamela Fryman | Kristin Newman | October 9, 2006 | 2ALH04 | 9.09 |
| 27 | 5 | "World's Greatest Couple" | Pamela Fryman | Brenda Hsueh | October 16, 2006 | 2ALH06 | 9.05 |
| 28 | 6 | "Aldrin Justice" | Pamela Fryman | Jamie Rhonheimer | October 23, 2006 | 2ALH05 | 9.59 |
| 29 | 7 | "Swarley" | Pamela Fryman | Greg Malins | November 6, 2006 | 2ALH07 | 8.22 |
| 30 | 8 | "Atlantic City" | Pamela Fryman | Maria Ferrari | November 13, 2006 | 2ALH08 | 9.33 |
| 31 | 9 | "Slap Bet" | Pamela Fryman | Kourtney Kang | November 20, 2006 | 2ALH09 | 8.85 |
| 32 | 10 | "Single Stamina" | Pamela Fryman | Kristin Newman | November 27, 2006 | 2ALH10 | 9.85 |
| 33 | 11 | "How Lily Stole Christmas" | Pamela Fryman | Brenda Hsueh | December 11, 2006 | 2ALH12 | 8.66 |
| 34 | 12 | "First Time in New York" | Pamela Fryman | Gloria Calderon Kellett | January 8, 2007 | 2ALH11 | 8.37 |
| 35 | 13 | "Columns" | Rob Greenberg | Matt Kuhn | January 22, 2007 | 2ALH14 | 9.42 |
| 36 | 14 | "Monday Night Football" | Rob Greenberg | Carter Bays & Craig Thomas | February 5, 2007 | 2ALH13 | 10.61 |
| 37 | 15 | "Lucky Penny" | Pamela Fryman | Jamie Rhonheimer | February 12, 2007 | 2ALH15 | 9.68 |
| 38 | 16 | "Stuff" | Pamela Fryman | Kourtney Kang | February 19, 2007 | 2ALH16 | 8.95 |
| 39 | 17 | "Arrivederci, Fiero" | Pamela Fryman | Chris Harris | February 26, 2007 | 2ALH17 | 9.33 |
| 40 | 18 | "Moving Day" | Pamela Fryman | Maria Ferrari | March 19, 2007 | 2ALH18 | 7.27 |
| 41 | 19 | "Bachelor Party" | Pamela Fryman | Carter Bays & Craig Thomas | April 9, 2007 | 2ALH19 | 7.64 |
| 42 | 20 | "Showdown" | Pamela Fryman | Gloria Calderon Kellett | April 30, 2007 | 2ALH20 | 7.24 |
| 43 | 21 | "Something Borrowed" | Pamela Fryman | Greg Malins | May 7, 2007 | 2ALH21 | 7.69 |
| 44 | 22 | "Something Blue" | Pamela Fryman | Carter Bays & Craig Thomas | May 14, 2007 | 2ALH22 | 7.70 |

=== Season 3 (2007–08) ===
Season three episodes
| No. overall | No. in season | Title | Directed by | Written by | Original release date | Prod. code | US viewers (millions) |
|---|---|---|---|---|---|---|---|
| 45 | 1 | "Wait for It" | Pamela Fryman | Carter Bays & Craig Thomas | September 24, 2007 | 3ALH01 | 8.12 |
| 46 | 2 | "We're Not from Here" | Pamela Fryman | Chris Harris | October 1, 2007 | 3ALH02 | 7.87 |
| 47 | 3 | "Third Wheel" | Pamela Fryman | David Hemingson | October 8, 2007 | 3ALH04 | 7.96 |
| 48 | 4 | "Little Boys" | Rob Greenberg | Kourtney Kang | October 15, 2007 | 3ALH03 | 7.71 |
| 49 | 5 | "How I Met Everyone Else" | Pamela Fryman | Gloria Calderon Kellett | October 22, 2007 | 3ALH05 | 8.50 |
| 50 | 6 | "I'm Not That Guy" | Pamela Fryman | Jonathan Groff | October 29, 2007 | 3ALH07 | 7.82 |
| 51 | 7 | "Dowisetrepla" | Pamela Fryman | Brenda Hsueh | November 5, 2007 | 3ALH06 | 8.77 |
| 52 | 8 | "Spoiler Alert" | Pamela Fryman | Stephen Lloyd | November 12, 2007 | 3ALH08 | 8.42 |
| 53 | 9 | "Slapsgiving" | Pamela Fryman | Matt Kuhn | November 19, 2007 | 3ALH09 | 8.07 |
| 54 | 10 | "The Yips" | Pamela Fryman | Jamie Rhonheimer | November 26, 2007 | 3ALH10 | 7.91 |
| 55 | 11 | "The Platinum Rule" | Pamela Fryman | Carter Bays & Craig Thomas | December 10, 2007 | 3ALH11 | 8.30 |
| 56 | 12 | "No Tomorrow" | Pamela Fryman | Carter Bays & Craig Thomas | March 17, 2008 | 3ALH12 | 9.61 |
| 57 | 13 | "Ten Sessions" | Pamela Fryman | Chris Harris and Carter Bays & Craig Thomas | March 24, 2008 | 3ALH14 | 10.67 |
| 58 | 14 | "The Bracket" | Pamela Fryman | Joe Kelly | March 31, 2008 | 3ALH13 | 9.50 |
| 59 | 15 | "The Chain of Screaming" | Pamela Fryman | Carter Bays & Craig Thomas | April 14, 2008 | 3ALH15 | 8.08 |
| 60 | 16 | "Sandcastles in the Sand" | Pamela Fryman | Kourtney Kang | April 21, 2008 | 3ALH16 | 8.45 |
| 61 | 17 | "The Goat" | Pamela Fryman | Stephen Lloyd | April 28, 2008 | 3ALH17 | 8.84 |
| 62 | 18 | "Rebound Bro" | Pamela Fryman | Jamie Rhonheimer | May 5, 2008 | 3ALH18 | 8.36 |
| 63 | 19 | "Everything Must Go" | Pamela Fryman | Jonathan Groff & Chris Harris | May 12, 2008 | 3ALH19 | 8.93 |
| 64 | 20 | "Miracles" | Pamela Fryman | Carter Bays & Craig Thomas | May 19, 2008 | 3ALH20 | 7.99 |

=== Season 4 (2008–09) ===
Season four episodes
| No. overall | No. in season | Title | Directed by | Written by | Original release date | Prod. code | US viewers (millions) |
|---|---|---|---|---|---|---|---|
| 65 | 1 | "Do I Know You?" | Pamela Fryman | Carter Bays & Craig Thomas | September 22, 2008 | 4ALH01 | 9.79 |
| 66 | 2 | "The Best Burger in New York" | Pamela Fryman | Carter Bays & Craig Thomas | September 29, 2008 | 4ALH02 | 8.72 |
| 67 | 3 | "I Heart NJ" | Pamela Fryman | Greg Malins | October 6, 2008 | 4ALH04 | 8.98 |
| 68 | 4 | "Intervention" | Michael Shea | Stephen Lloyd | October 13, 2008 | 4ALH03 | 9.25 |
| 69 | 5 | "Shelter Island" | Pamela Fryman | Chris Harris | October 20, 2008 | 4ALH05 | 9.45 |
| 70 | 6 | "Happily Ever After" | Pamela Fryman | Jamie Rhonheimer | November 3, 2008 | 4ALH06 | 9.40 |
| 71 | 7 | "Not a Father's Day" | Pamela Fryman | Robia Rashid | November 10, 2008 | 4ALH07 | 9.79 |
| 72 | 8 | "Woooo!" | Pamela Fryman | Carter Bays & Craig Thomas | November 17, 2008 | 4ALH09 | 9.99 |
| 73 | 9 | "The Naked Man" | Pamela Fryman | Joe Kelly | November 24, 2008 | 4ALH08 | 9.96 |
| 74 | 10 | "The Fight" | Pamela Fryman | Theresa Mulligan Rosenthal | December 8, 2008 | 4ALH10 | 10.49 |
| 75 | 11 | "Little Minnesota" | Pamela Fryman | Chuck Tatham | December 15, 2008 | 4ALH12 | 11.37 |
| 76 | 12 | "Benefits" | Pamela Fryman | Kourtney Kang | January 12, 2009 | 4ALH11 | 11.76 |
| 77 | 13 | "Three Days of Snow" | Pamela Fryman | Matt Kuhn | January 19, 2009 | 4ALH13 | 10.69 |
| 78 | 14 | "The Possimpible" | Pamela Fryman | Jonathan Groff | February 2, 2009 | 4ALH14 | 10.31 |
| 79 | 15 | "The Stinsons" | Pamela Fryman | Carter Bays & Craig Thomas | March 2, 2009 | 4ALH15 | 11.09 |
| 80 | 16 | "Sorry, Bro" | Pamela Fryman | Craig Gerard & Matthew Zinman | March 9, 2009 | 4ALH16 | 8.68 |
| 81 | 17 | "The Front Porch" | Rob Greenberg | Chris Harris | March 16, 2009 | 4ALH17 | 9.29 |
| 82 | 18 | "Old King Clancy" | Pamela Fryman | Jamie Rhonheimer | March 23, 2009 | 4ALH19 | 7.36 |
| 83 | 19 | "Murtaugh" | Pamela Fryman | Joe Kelly | March 30, 2009 | 4ALH18 | 9.20 |
| 84 | 20 | "Mosbius Designs" | Pamela Fryman | Kourtney Kang | April 13, 2009 | 4ALH20 | 9.60 |
| 85 | 21 | "The Three Days Rule" | Pamela Fryman | Greg Malins | April 27, 2009 | 4ALH22 | 8.87 |
| 86 | 22 | "Right Place, Right Time" | Pamela Fryman | Stephen Lloyd | May 4, 2009 | 4ALH21 | 8.89 |
| 87 | 23 | "As Fast as She Can" | Pamela Fryman | Carter Bays & Craig Thomas | May 11, 2009 | 4ALH23 | 8.78 |
| 88 | 24 | "The Leap" | Pamela Fryman | Carter Bays & Craig Thomas | May 18, 2009 | 4ALH24 | 8.73 |

=== Season 5 (2009–10) ===
Season five episodes
| No. overall | No. in season | Title | Directed by | Written by | Original release date | Prod. code | US viewers (millions) |
|---|---|---|---|---|---|---|---|
| 89 | 1 | "Definitions" | Pamela Fryman | Carter Bays & Craig Thomas | September 21, 2009 | 5ALH01 | 9.09 |
| 90 | 2 | "Double Date" | Pamela Fryman | Matt Kuhn | September 28, 2009 | 5ALH02 | 8.71 |
| 91 | 3 | "Robin 101" | Pamela Fryman | Carter Bays & Craig Thomas | October 5, 2009 | 5ALH03 | 8.08 |
| 92 | 4 | "The Sexless Innkeeper" | Pamela Fryman | Kourtney Kang | October 12, 2009 | 5ALH04 | 8.56 |
| 93 | 5 | "Duel Citizenship" | Pamela Fryman | Chuck Tatham | October 19, 2009 | 5ALH05 | 8.07 |
| 94 | 6 | "Bagpipes" | Pamela Fryman | Robia Rashid | November 2, 2009 | 5ALH06 | 8.82 |
| 95 | 7 | "The Rough Patch" | Pamela Fryman | Chris Harris | November 9, 2009 | 5ALH07 | 8.67 |
| 96 | 8 | "The Playbook" | Pamela Fryman | Carter Bays & Craig Thomas | November 16, 2009 | 5ALH08 | 8.16 |
| 97 | 9 | "Slapsgiving 2: Revenge of the Slap" | Pamela Fryman | Jamie Rhonheimer | November 23, 2009 | 5ALH09 | 8.75 |
| 98 | 10 | "The Window" | Pamela Fryman | Joe Kelly | December 7, 2009 | 5ALH11 | 8.79 |
| 99 | 11 | "Last Cigarette Ever" | Pamela Fryman | Theresa Mulligan Rosenthal | December 14, 2009 | 5ALH10 | 9.65 |
| 100 | 12 | "Girls vs. Suits" | Pamela Fryman | Carter Bays & Craig Thomas | January 11, 2010 | 5ALH12 | 9.78 |
| 101 | 13 | "Jenkins" | Neil Patrick Harris | Greg Malins | January 18, 2010 | 5ALH13 | 10.41 |
| 102 | 14 | "Perfect Week" | Pamela Fryman | Craig Gerard & Matthew Zinman | February 1, 2010 | 5ALH14 | 9.28 |
| 103 | 15 | "Rabbit or Duck" | Pamela Fryman | Carter Bays & Craig Thomas | February 8, 2010 | 5ALH15 | 10.00 |
| 104 | 16 | "Hooked" | Pamela Fryman | Kourtney Kang | March 1, 2010 | 5ALH16 | 10.37 |
| 105 | 17 | "Of Course" | Pamela Fryman | Matt Kuhn | March 8, 2010 | 5ALH18 | 10.06 |
| 106 | 18 | "Say Cheese" | Pamela Fryman | Robia Rashid | March 22, 2010 | 5ALH17 | 8.37 |
| 107 | 19 | "Zoo or False" | Pamela Fryman | Stephen Lloyd | April 12, 2010 | 5ALH22 | 6.80 |
| 108 | 20 | "Home Wreckers" | Pamela Fryman | Chris Harris | April 19, 2010 | 5ALH20 | 7.71 |
| 109 | 21 | "Twin Beds" | Pamela Fryman | Theresa Mulligan Rosenthal | May 3, 2010 | 5ALH19 | 7.70 |
| 110 | 22 | "Robots vs. Wrestlers" | Rob Greenberg | Jamie Rhonheimer | May 10, 2010 | 5ALH21 | 8.10 |
| 111 | 23 | "The Wedding Bride" | Pamela Fryman | Stephen Lloyd | May 17, 2010 | 5ALH24 | 7.63 |
| 112 | 24 | "Doppelgangers" | Pamela Fryman | Carter Bays & Craig Thomas | May 24, 2010 | 5ALH23 | 8.06 |

=== Season 6 (2010–11) ===
Season six episodes
| No. overall | No. in season | Title | Directed by | Written by | Original release date | Prod. code | US viewers (millions) |
|---|---|---|---|---|---|---|---|
| 113 | 1 | "Big Days" | Pamela Fryman | Carter Bays & Craig Thomas | September 20, 2010 | 6ALH01 | 8.79 |
| 114 | 2 | "Cleaning House" | Pamela Fryman | Stephen Lloyd | September 27, 2010 | 6ALH02 | 9.00 |
| 115 | 3 | "Unfinished" | Pamela Fryman | Jamie Rhonheimer | October 4, 2010 | 6ALH03 | 8.60 |
| 116 | 4 | "Subway Wars" | Pamela Fryman | Chris Harris | October 11, 2010 | 6ALH04 | 8.48 |
| 117 | 5 | "Architect of Destruction" | Pamela Fryman | Carter Bays & Craig Thomas | October 18, 2010 | 6ALH05 | 8.05 |
| 118 | 6 | "Baby Talk" | Pamela Fryman | Joe Kelly | October 25, 2010 | 6ALH07 | 8.29 |
| 119 | 7 | "Canning Randy" | Pamela Fryman | Chuck Tatham | November 1, 2010 | 6ALH06 | 8.88 |
| 120 | 8 | "Natural History" | Pamela Fryman | Carter Bays & Craig Thomas | November 8, 2010 | 6ALH09 | 8.87 |
| 121 | 9 | "Glitter" | Pamela Fryman | Kourtney Kang | November 15, 2010 | 6ALH08 | 8.87 |
| 122 | 10 | "Blitzgiving" | Pamela Fryman | Theresa Mulligan Rosenthal | November 22, 2010 | 6ALH10 | 8.73 |
| 123 | 11 | "The Mermaid Theory" | Pamela Fryman | Robia Rashid | December 6, 2010 | 6ALH11 | 9.26 |
| 124 | 12 | "False Positive" | Pamela Fryman | Craig Gerard & Matthew Zinman | December 13, 2010 | 6ALH12 | 9.70 |
| 125 | 13 | "Bad News" | Pamela Fryman | Jennifer Hendriks | January 3, 2011 | 6ALH13 | 10.15 |
| 126 | 14 | "Last Words" | Pamela Fryman | Carter Bays & Craig Thomas | January 17, 2011 | 6ALH14 | 10.54 |
| 127 | 15 | "Oh Honey" | Pamela Fryman | Carter Bays & Craig Thomas | February 7, 2011 | 6ALH15 | 10.00 |
| 128 | 16 | "Desperation Day" | Pamela Fryman | Tami Sagher | February 14, 2011 | 6ALH16 | 9.51 |
| 129 | 17 | "Garbage Island" | Michael Shea | Tom Ruprecht | February 21, 2011 | 6ALH17 | 9.33 |
| 130 | 18 | "A Change of Heart" | Pamela Fryman | Matt Kuhn | February 28, 2011 | 6ALH19 | 9.24 |
| 131 | 19 | "Legendaddy" | Pamela Fryman | Dan Gregor & Doug Mand | March 21, 2011 | 6ALH18 | 8.03 |
| 132 | 20 | "The Exploding Meatball Sub" | Pamela Fryman | Stephen Lloyd | April 11, 2011 | 6ALH20 | 6.87 |
| 133 | 21 | "Hopeless" | Pamela Fryman | Chris Harris | April 18, 2011 | 6ALH22 | 6.49 |
| 134 | 22 | "The Perfect Cocktail" | Pamela Fryman | Joe Kelly | May 2, 2011 | 6ALH21 | 6.77 |
| 135 | 23 | "Landmarks" | Pamela Fryman | Carter Bays & Craig Thomas | May 9, 2011 | 6ALH24 | 6.41 |
| 136 | 24 | "Challenge Accepted" | Pamela Fryman | Carter Bays & Craig Thomas | May 16, 2011 | 6ALH23 | 7.15 |

=== Season 7 (2011–12) ===
Season seven episodes
| No. overall | No. in season | Title | Directed by | Written by | Original release date | Prod. code | US viewers (millions) |
|---|---|---|---|---|---|---|---|
| 137 | 1 | "The Best Man" | Pamela Fryman | Carter Bays & Craig Thomas | September 19, 2011 | 7ALH01 | 11.00 |
| 138 | 2 | "The Naked Truth" | Pamela Fryman | Stephen Lloyd | September 19, 2011 | 7ALH02 | 12.22 |
| 139 | 3 | "Ducky Tie" | Rob Greenberg | Carter Bays & Craig Thomas | September 26, 2011 | 7ALH03 | 10.50 |
| 140 | 4 | "The Stinson Missile Crisis" | Pamela Fryman | Kourtney Kang | October 3, 2011 | 7ALH04 | 10.39 |
| 141 | 5 | "Field Trip" | Pamela Fryman | Jamie Rhonheimer | October 10, 2011 | 7ALH06 | 8.89 |
| 142 | 6 | "Mystery vs. History" | Pamela Fryman | Chuck Tatham | October 17, 2011 | 7ALH05 | 9.81 |
| 143 | 7 | "Noretta" | Pamela Fryman | Matt Kuhn | October 24, 2011 | 7ALH07 | 9.87 |
| 144 | 8 | "The Slutty Pumpkin Returns" | Pamela Fryman | Tami Sagher | October 31, 2011 | 7ALH08 | 10.49 |
| 145 | 9 | "Disaster Averted" | Michael Shea | Robia Rashid | November 7, 2011 | 7ALH09 | 10.28 |
| 146 | 10 | "Tick, Tick, Tick" | Pamela Fryman | Chris Harris | November 14, 2011 | 7ALH10 | 10.42 |
| 147 | 11 | "The Rebound Girl" | Pamela Fryman | Carter Bays & Craig Thomas | November 21, 2011 | 7ALH11 | 10.01 |
| 148 | 12 | "Symphony of Illumination" | Pamela Fryman | Joe Kelly | December 5, 2011 | 7ALH12 | 11.51 |
| 149 | 13 | "Tailgate" | Pamela Fryman | Carter Bays & Craig Thomas | January 2, 2012 | 7ALH13 | 10.14 |
| 150 | 14 | "46 Minutes" | Pamela Fryman | Dan Gregor & Doug Mand | January 16, 2012 | 7ALH14 | 10.08 |
| 151 | 15 | "The Burning Beekeeper" | Pamela Fryman | Carter Bays & Craig Thomas | February 6, 2012 | 7ALH17 | 9.98 |
| 152 | 16 | "The Drunk Train" | Pamela Fryman | Craig Gerard & Matthew Zinman | February 13, 2012 | 7ALH16 | 9.01 |
| 153 | 17 | "No Pressure" | Pamela Fryman | George Sloan | February 20, 2012 | 7ALH15 | 9.68 |
| 154 | 18 | "Karma" | Pamela Fryman | Stephen Lloyd | February 27, 2012 | 7ALH18 | 9.07 |
| 155 | 19 | "The Broath" | Pamela Fryman | Carter Bays & Craig Thomas | March 19, 2012 | 7ALH19 | 8.15 |
| 156 | 20 | "Trilogy Time" | Pamela Fryman | Kourtney Kang | April 9, 2012 | 7ALH23 | 8.00 |
| 157 | 21 | "Now We're Even" | Pamela Fryman | Chuck Tatham | April 16, 2012 | 7ALH22 | 7.24 |
| 158 | 22 | "Good Crazy" | Pamela Fryman | Carter Bays & Craig Thomas | April 30, 2012 | 7ALH20 | 7.99 |
| 159 | 23 | "The Magician's Code" | Pamela Fryman | Jennifer Hendriks | May 14, 2012 | 7ALH21 | 8.58 |
| 160 | 24 | "The Magician's Code" | Pamela Fryman | Carter Bays & Craig Thomas | May 14, 2012 | 7ALH24 | 8.58 |

=== Season 8 (2012–13) ===
Season eight episodes
| No. overall | No. in season | Title | Directed by | Written by | Original release date | Prod. code | US viewers (millions) |
|---|---|---|---|---|---|---|---|
| 161 | 1 | "Farhampton" | Pamela Fryman | Carter Bays & Craig Thomas | September 24, 2012 | 8ALH01 | 8.84 |
| 162 | 2 | "The Pre-Nup" | Pamela Fryman | Carter Bays & Craig Thomas | October 1, 2012 | 8ALH02 | 8.17 |
| 163 | 3 | "Nannies" | Pamela Fryman | Chuck Tatham | October 8, 2012 | 8ALH03 | 7.82 |
| 164 | 4 | "Who Wants to Be a Godparent?" | Pamela Fryman | Matt Kuhn | October 15, 2012 | 8ALH04 | 7.93 |
| 165 | 5 | "The Autumn of Break-Ups" | Pamela Fryman | Kourtney Kang | November 5, 2012 | 8ALH06 | 7.22 |
| 166 | 6 | "Splitsville" | Pamela Fryman | Stephen Lloyd | November 12, 2012 | 8ALH05 | 7.95 |
| 167 | 7 | "The Stamp Tramp" | Pamela Fryman | Tami Sagher | November 19, 2012 | 8ALH07 | 7.45 |
| 168 | 8 | "Twelve Horny Women" | Pamela Fryman | Eric Falconer & Romanski | November 26, 2012 | 8ALH08 | 8.73 |
| 169 | 9 | "Lobster Crawl" | Pamela Fryman | Barbara Adler | December 3, 2012 | 8ALH09 | 8.26 |
| 170 | 10 | "The Over-Correction" | Pamela Fryman | Craig Gerard & Matthew Zinman | December 10, 2012 | 8ALH10 | 8.82 |
| 171 | 11 | "The Final Page" | Pamela Fryman | Dan Gregor & Doug Mand | December 17, 2012 | 8ALH11 | 8.70 |
| 172 | 12 | "The Final Page" | Pamela Fryman | Carter Bays & Craig Thomas | December 17, 2012 | 8ALH12 | 8.70 |
| 173 | 13 | "Band or DJ?" | Pamela Fryman | Carter Bays & Craig Thomas | January 14, 2013 | 8ALH13 | 10.51 |
| 174 | 14 | "Ring Up!" | Pamela Fryman | Jennifer Hendriks | January 21, 2013 | 8ALH14 | 10.07 |
| 175 | 15 | "P.S. I Love You" | Pamela Fryman | Carter Bays & Craig Thomas | February 4, 2013 | 8ALH15 | 10.30 |
| 176 | 16 | "Bad Crazy" | Pamela Fryman | Carter Bays & Craig Thomas | February 11, 2013 | 8ALH16 | 8.98 |
| 177 | 17 | "The Ashtray" | Pamela Fryman | Carter Bays & Craig Thomas | February 18, 2013 | 8ALH18 | 8.85 |
| 178 | 18 | "Weekend at Barney's" | Pamela Fryman | George Sloan | February 25, 2013 | 8ALH17 | 8.59 |
| 179 | 19 | "The Fortress" | Michael Shea | Stephen Lloyd | March 18, 2013 | 8ALH20 | 7.44 |
| 180 | 20 | "The Time Travelers" | Pamela Fryman | Carter Bays & Craig Thomas | March 25, 2013 | 8ALH19 | 6.99 |
| 181 | 21 | "Romeward Bound" | Pamela Fryman | Chuck Tatham | April 15, 2013 | 8ALH22 | 6.58 |
| 182 | 22 | "The Bro Mitzvah" | Pamela Fryman | Chris Harris | April 29, 2013 | 8ALH21 | 7.06 |
| 183 | 23 | "Something Old" | Pamela Fryman | Carter Bays & Craig Thomas | May 6, 2013 | 8ALH23 | 6.99 |
| 184 | 24 | "Something New" | Pamela Fryman | Carter Bays & Craig Thomas | May 13, 2013 | 8ALH24 | 8.57 |

=== Season 9 (2013–14) ===
Season nine episodes
| No. overall | No. in season | Title | Directed by | Written by | Original release date | Prod. code | US viewers (millions) |
|---|---|---|---|---|---|---|---|
| 185 | 1 | "The Locket" | Pamela Fryman | Carter Bays & Craig Thomas | September 23, 2013 | 9ALH01 | 9.40 |
| 186 | 2 | "Coming Back" | Pamela Fryman | Carter Bays & Craig Thomas | September 23, 2013 | 9ALH02 | 9.40 |
| 187 | 3 | "Last Time in New York" | Pamela Fryman | Craig Gerard & Matthew Zinman | September 30, 2013 | 9ALH04 | 7.87 |
| 188 | 4 | "The Broken Code" | Pamela Fryman | Matt Kuhn | October 7, 2013 | 9ALH03 | 7.53 |
| 189 | 5 | "The Poker Game" | Pamela Fryman | Dan Gregor & Doug Mand | October 14, 2013 | 9ALH05 | 7.98 |
| 190 | 6 | "Knight Vision" | Pamela Fryman | Chris Harris | October 21, 2013 | 9ALH07 | 7.64 |
| 191 | 7 | "No Questions Asked" | Pamela Fryman | Stephen Lloyd | October 28, 2013 | 9ALH06 | 7.63 |
| 192 | 8 | "The Lighthouse" | Pamela Fryman | Rachel Axler | November 4, 2013 | 9ALH08 | 8.67 |
| 193 | 9 | "Platonish" | Pamela Fryman | George Sloan | November 11, 2013 | 9ALH10 | 8.08 |
| 194 | 10 | "Mom and Dad" | Pamela Fryman | Carter Bays & Craig Thomas | November 18, 2013 | 9ALH09 | 8.11 |
| 195 | 11 | "Bedtime Stories" | Pamela Fryman | Carter Bays & Craig Thomas | November 25, 2013 | 9ALH12 | 7.64 |
| 196 | 12 | "The Rehearsal Dinner" | Pamela Fryman | Chuck Tatham | December 2, 2013 | 9ALH11 | 8.04 |
| 197 | 13 | "Bass Player Wanted" | Pamela Fryman | Carter Bays & Craig Thomas | December 16, 2013 | 9ALH13 | 7.71 |
| 198 | 14 | "Slapsgiving 3: Slappointment in Slapmarra" | Pamela Fryman | Carter Bays & Craig Thomas | January 13, 2014 | 9ALH15 | 8.59 |
| 199 | 15 | "Unpause" | Pamela Fryman | Chris Harris | January 20, 2014 | 9ALH14 | 8.83 |
| 200 | 16 | "How Your Mother Met Me" | Pamela Fryman | Carter Bays & Craig Thomas | January 27, 2014 | 9ALH16 | 10.81 |
| 201 | 17 | "Sunrise" | Pamela Fryman | Carter Bays & Craig Thomas | February 3, 2014 | 9ALH18 | 9.98 |
| 202 | 18 | "Rally" | Pamela Fryman | Carter Bays & Craig Thomas | February 24, 2014 | 9ALH17 | 9.28 |
| 203 | 19 | "Vesuvius" | Pamela Fryman | Barbara Adler | March 3, 2014 | 9ALH19 | 9.11 |
| 204 | 20 | "Daisy" | Pamela Fryman | Carter Bays & Craig Thomas | March 10, 2014 | 9ALH20 | 7.70 |
| 205 | 21 | "Gary Blauman" | Pamela Fryman | Kourtney Kang | March 17, 2014 | 9ALH22 | 7.78 |
| 206 | 22 | "The End of the Aisle" | Pamela Fryman | Carter Bays & Craig Thomas | March 24, 2014 | 9ALH21 | 9.04 |
| 207 | 23 | "Last Forever" | Pamela Fryman | Carter Bays & Craig Thomas | March 31, 2014 | 9ALH23 | 13.13 |
| 208 | 24 | "Last Forever" | Pamela Fryman | Carter Bays & Craig Thomas | March 31, 2014 | 9ALH24 | 13.13 |

== Ratings ==
=== Season 1–3 ===
How I Met Your Mother : U.S. viewers per episode (millions)

| Season | Episode number | | | | | | | | | | | | | | | | | | | | | |
| Season | 1 | 2 | 3 | 4 | 5 | 6 | 7 | 8 | 9 | 10 | 11 | 12 | 13 | 14 | 15 | 16 | 17 | 18 | 19 | 20 | 21 | 22 |
|---|---|---|---|---|---|---|---|---|---|---|---|---|---|---|---|---|---|---|---|---|---|---|
| 1 | 10.94 | 10.40 | 10.44 | 9.84 | 10.14 | 10.89 | 10.55 | 10.35 | 10.29 | 12.27 | 10.36 | 11.49 | 10.82 | 10.94 | 9.82 | 10.15 | 9.80 | 7.65 | 7.60 | 7.24 | 8.07 | 8.64 |
| 2 | 10.48 | 9.14 | 9.32 | 9.09 | 9.05 | 9.59 | 8.22 | 9.33 | 8.85 | 9.85 | 8.81 | 8.37 | 9.42 | 10.61 | 9.68 | 8.95 | 9.33 | 7.27 | 7.64 | 7.24 | 7.69 | 7.70 |
| 3 | 8.12 | 7.88 | 7.96 | 7.71 | 8.50 | 8.55 | 8.77 | 8.58 | 8.07 | 7.91 | 8.49 | 9.73 | 10.67 | 9.50 | 7.99 | 8.45 | 8.84 | 8.36 | 8.93 | 7.99 | – | |

Audience measurement performed by Nielsen Media Research (Note: For the first season see, Episode one: Episode two: Episode three: Episode four: Episode five: Episode six: Episode seven: Episode eight: Episode nine: Episode ten: Episode eleven: Episode twelve: Episode thirteen: Episode fourteen: Episode fifteen: Episode sixteen: Episode seventeen: Episode eighteen: Episode nineteen: Episode twenty: Episode twenty-one: Episode twenty-two:) (Note: For the second season see, Episode one: Episode two: Episode three: Episode four: Episode five: Episode six: Episode seven: Episode eight: Episode nine: Episode ten: Episode eleven: Episode twelve: Episode thirteen: Episode fourteen: Episode fifteen: Episode sixteen: Episode seventeen: Episode eighteen: Episode nineteen: Episode twenty: Episode twenty-one: Episode twenty-two:) (Note: For the third season see, Episode one: Episode two: Episode three: Episode four: Episode five: Episode six: Episode seven: Episode eight: Episode nine: Episode ten: Episode eleven: Episode twelve: Episode thirteen: Episode fourteen: Episode fifteen: Episode sixteen: Episode seventeen: Episode eighteen: Episode nineteen: Episode twenty:)

=== Season 4–6 ===
How I Met Your Mother : U.S. viewers per episode (millions)

| Season | Episode number | | | | | | | | | | | | | | | | | | | | | | | |
| Season | 1 | 2 | 3 | 4 | 5 | 6 | 7 | 8 | 9 | 10 | 11 | 12 | 13 | 14 | 15 | 16 | 17 | 18 | 19 | 20 | 21 | 22 | 23 | 24 |
|---|---|---|---|---|---|---|---|---|---|---|---|---|---|---|---|---|---|---|---|---|---|---|---|---|
| 4 | 9.79 | 8.72 | 8.98 | 9.25 | 9.45 | 9.40 | 9.79 | 9.99 | 10.04 | 10.49 | 11.44 | 11.76 | 10.69 | 10.30 | 11.08 | 8.51 | 9.29 | 7.36 | 9.20 | 9.56 | 8.87 | 8.89 | 8.70 | 8.73 |
| 5 | 9.09 | 8.73 | 8.23 | 8.56 | 8.07 | 8.82 | 8.82 | 8.44 | 8.75 | 8.79 | 9.65 | 9.78 | 10.52 | 9.28 | 10.00 | 10.37 | 10.06 | 8.37 | 6.88 | 7.71 | 7.70 | 8.16 | 7.69 | 8.18 |
| 6 | 8.79 | 9.00 | 8.60 | 8.48 | 8.05 | 8.29 | 8.88 | 8.87 | 8.87 | 8.73 | 9.26 | 9.70 | 10.15 | 10.54 | 10.00 | 9.51 | 9.33 | 9.24 | 8.03 | 6.87 | 6.49 | 6.77 | 6.41 | 7.16 |

Audience measurement performed by Nielsen Media Research (Note: For the fourth season see, Episode one: Episode two: Episode three: Episode four: Episode five: Episode six: Episode seven: Episode eight: Episode nine: Episode ten: Episode eleven: Episode twelve: Episode thirteen: Episode fourteen: Episode fifteen: Episode sixteen: Episode seventeen: Episode eighteen: Episode nineteen: Episode twenty: Episode twenty: Episode twenty: Episode twenty: Episode twenty:) (Note: For the fifth season see, Episode one: Episode two: Episode three: Episode four: Episode five: Episode six: Episode seven: Episode eight: Episode nine: Episode ten: Episode eleven: Episode twelve: Episode thirteen: Episode fourteen: Episode fifteen: Episode sixteen: Episode seventeen: Episode eighteen: Episode nineteen: Episode twenty: Episode twenty-one: Episode twenty-one: Episode twenty-one: Episode twenty-one:) (Note: For the sixth season see, Episode one: Episode two: Episode three: Episode four: Episode five: Episode six: Episode seven: Episode eight: Episode nine: Episode ten: Episode eleven: Episode twelve: Episode thirteen: Episode fourteen: Episode fifteen: Episode sixteen: Episode seventeen: Episode eighteen: Episode nineteen: Episode twenty: Episode twenty-one: Episode twenty-one: Episode twenty-one: Episode twenty-one:)

=== Season 7–9 ===
How I Met Your Mother : U.S. viewers per episode (millions)

| Season | Episode number | | | | | | | | | | | | | | | | | | | | | | | |
| Season | 1 | 2 | 3 | 4 | 5 | 6 | 7 | 8 | 9 | 10 | 11 | 12 | 13 | 14 | 15 | 16 | 17 | 18 | 19 | 20 | 21 | 22 | 23 | 24 |
|---|---|---|---|---|---|---|---|---|---|---|---|---|---|---|---|---|---|---|---|---|---|---|---|---|
| 7 | 11.00 | 12.22 | 10.50 | 10.39 | 8.89 | 9.81 | 9.87 | 10.49 | 10.28 | 10.42 | 10.01 | 11.51 | 10.14 | 10.08 | 9.98 | 9.01 | 9.68 | 9.07 | 8.15 | 8.00 | 7.24 | 7.99 | 8.58 | 8.58 |
| 8 | 8.84 | 8.17 | 7.82 | 7.93 | 7.22 | 7.95 | 7.45 | 8.73 | 8.26 | 8.82 | 8.70 | 8.70 | 10.51 | 10.07 | 10.30 | 8.98 | 8.85 | 8.59 | 7.44 | 6.99 | 6.58 | 7.06 | 6.99 | 8.57 |
| 9 | 9.40 | 9.40 | 7.87 | 7.53 | 7.98 | 7.64 | 7.63 | 8.67 | 8.08 | 8.11 | 7.64 | 8.04 | 7.71 | 8.59 | 8.83 | 10.81 | 9.98 | 9.28 | 9.11 | 7.70 | 7.78 | 9.04 | 13.13 | 13.13 |

Audience measurement performed by Nielsen Media Research (Note: For the seventh season, see) (Note: For the eighth season, see) (Note: For the ninth season, see)
