= List of awards and nominations received by How I Met Your Mother =

Awards and nominations received by How I Met Your Mother
Awards and nominations
Award	Wins	Nominations
ALMA Awards	1	2
Art Directors Guild Awards	0	10
Artios Awards	0	1
Critics' Choice Television Awards	1	1
EWwy Awards	1	2
GLAAD Media Awards	0	1
Golden Globe Awards	0	2
Golden Nymph Awards	1	1
Guild of Music Supervisors Awards	0	1
Humanitas Prizes	0	3
ICG Publicists Awards	0	1
People's Choice Awards	5	19
Primetime Emmy Awards	10	30
Prism Awards	1	2
Satellite Awards	0	4
TCA Awards	0	2
Teen Choice Awards	0	6
Writers Guild of America Awards	1	1
Young Artist Awards	0	2

Totals (Note: Certain award groups do not simply award one winner. They acknowledge several different recipients, have runners-up, and have third place. Since this is a specific recognition and is different from losing an award, runner-up mentions are considered wins in this award tally. For simplification and to avoid errors, each award in this list has been presumed to have had a prior nomination.)
- Wins: 21
- Nominations: 91

How I Met Your Mother (often abbreviated to HIMYM) is an American sitcom that premiered on CBS on September 19, 2005, and concluded on March 31, 2014. The series follows Ted Mosby (Josh Radnor) and his group of friends, Marshall Eriksen (Jason Segel), Robin Scherbatsky (Cobie Smulders), Lily Aldrin (Alyson Hannigan), and Barney Stinson (Neil Patrick Harris). As a framing device, Ted, in the year 2030, recounts to his son and daughter the events that led him to meeting their mother.

The show was created by Craig Thomas and Carter Bays, who also serve as the show's executive producers and frequent writers. The series was loosely inspired by their friendship when they both lived in New York City. Known for its unique structure and eccentric humor, How I Met Your Mother has received positive reviews throughout most of its run and has gained a cult following over the years.

The show has been nominated for 91 awards, winning 21. The show has been nominated for 30 Primetime Emmy Awards, including a nomination for Outstanding Comedy Series. Stars Alyson Hannigan and Neil Patrick Harris have each received acting accolades, with both receiving People's Choice Awards, and Harris receiving Emmy and Golden Globe nominations. In 2012, seven years after its premiere, the series won the People's Choice for Favorite Network TV Comedy. The show's art direction, editing and cinematography have also been awarded.

== Awards and nominations ==
Awards and nominations received by How I Met Your Mother
Award	Year (Note: The listed year refers to the date of the ceremony, not necessarily the year in which the corresponding season or episode aired.)	Category	Nominee(s)	Result	Ref.
ALMA Awards	2006	Outstanding Script for a Television Drama or Comedy	Gloria Calderón Kellett (for "The Duel")	Nominated	
ALMA Awards	2008	Outstanding Writing for a Television Series	Gloria Calderón Kellett (for "How I Met Everyone Else")	Won	
Art Directors Guild Awards	2006	Episode of a Multi-Camera Television Series	Stephan Olson (for "Pilot")	Nominated	
Art Directors Guild Awards	2007	Episode of a Multi-Camera Television Series	Stephan Olson (for "World's Greatest Couple")	Nominated	
Art Directors Guild Awards	2008	Episode of a Multi-Camera Television Series	Stephan Olson (for "Something Blue")	Nominated	
Art Directors Guild Awards	2009	Episode of a Multi-Camera Television Series	Stephan Olson, Daniel Saks, and Susan Mina Eschelbach (for "Miracles")	Nominated	
Art Directors Guild Awards	2010	Episode of a Multi-Camera, Variety, or Unscripted Series	Stephan Olson, Daniel Saks, Craig Vilaubi, and Susan Mina Eschelbach (for "Old King Clancy")	Nominated	
Art Directors Guild Awards	2011	Episode of a Multi-Camera Television Series	Stephan Olson, Daniel Saks, and Susan Eschelbach (for "Natural History")	Nominated	
Art Directors Guild Awards	2012	Episode of a Multi-Camera, Variety, or Unscripted Series	Stephan Olson, Daniel Saks, and Susan Eschelbach (for "Ducky Tie")	Nominated	
Art Directors Guild Awards	2013	Episode of a Multi-Camera, Variety, or Unscripted Series	Stephan Olson, Daniel Saks, and Susan Eschelbach (for "The Magician's Code, Part 1")	Nominated	
Art Directors Guild Awards	2014	Episode of a Multi-Camera, Variety, or Unscripted Series	Stephan Olson, Daniel Saks, and Susan Eschelbach (for "The Lighthouse")	Nominated	
Art Directors Guild Awards	2015	Multi-Camera Television Series	Stephan Olson, Daniel Saks, and Susan Eschelbach (for "How Your Mother Met Me")	Nominated	
Artios Awards	2006	Outstanding Achievement in Casting: Television Pilot – Comedy	Megan Branman	Nominated	
Critics' Choice Television Awards	2011	Best Supporting Actor in a Comedy Series	Neil Patrick Harris	Won	
EWwy Awards	2013	Best Comedy Series	How I Met Your Mother	Nominated	
EWwy Awards	2013	Best Supporting Actress, Comedy	Cobie Smulders	Won	
GLAAD Media Awards	2007	Outstanding Individual Episode	"Single Stamina"	Nominated	
Golden Globe Awards	2009	Best Supporting Actor – Series, Miniseries or Television Film	Neil Patrick Harris	Nominated	
Golden Globe Awards	2010	Best Supporting Actor – Series, Miniseries or Television Film	Neil Patrick Harris	Nominated	
Golden Nymph Awards	2015	International TV Audience Award (Comedy)	How I Met Your Mother	Won	
Guild of Music Supervisors Awards	2013	Scripted Comedy/Musical	Andrew Gowan	Nominated	
Humanitas Prizes	2009	30 Minute Category	Jamie Rhonheimer (for "Happily Ever After")	Nominated	
Humanitas Prizes	2011	30 Minute Category	Carter Bays and Craig Thomas (for "Last Words")	Nominated	
Humanitas Prizes	2015	30 Minute Category	Carter Bays and Craig Thomas (for "Last Forever, Part 2")	Nominated	
ICG Publicists Awards	2014	Maxwell Weinberg Campaign Award, TV	20th Century Fox Television	Nominated	
People's Choice Awards	2006	Favorite New TV Comedy Series	How I Met Your Mother	Nominated	
People's Choice Awards	2008	Favorite Scene Stealing Star	Neil Patrick Harris	Nominated	
People's Choice Awards	2009	Favorite Scene Stealing Guest Star	Britney Spears	Nominated	
People's Choice Awards	2010	Favorite TV Comedy	How I Met Your Mother	Nominated	
People's Choice Awards	2010	Favorite TV Comedy Actress	Alyson Hannigan	Won	
People's Choice Awards	2010	Favorite TV Comedy Actor	Neil Patrick Harris	Nominated	
People's Choice Awards	2011	Favorite TV Comedy	How I Met Your Mother	Nominated	
People's Choice Awards	2011	Favorite TV Comedy Actress	Alyson Hannigan	Nominated	
People's Choice Awards	2011	Favorite TV Comedy Actor	Neil Patrick Harris	Won	
People's Choice Awards	2011	Favorite TV Guest Star	Carrie Underwood	Nominated	
People's Choice Awards	2012	Favorite TV Comedy	How I Met Your Mother	Won	
People's Choice Awards	2012	Favorite TV Comedy Actor	Neil Patrick Harris	Won	
People's Choice Awards	2012	Favorite TV Guest Star	Katy Perry	Won	
People's Choice Awards	2013	Favorite Network TV Comedy	How I Met Your Mother	Nominated	
People's Choice Awards	2013	Favorite Comedic TV Actor	Neil Patrick Harris	Nominated	
People's Choice Awards	2014	Favorite Network TV Comedy	How I Met Your Mother	Nominated	
People's Choice Awards	2014	Favorite Comedic TV Actor	Neil Patrick Harris	Nominated	
People's Choice Awards	2014	Favorite TV Bromance	Ted Mosby (Josh Radnor), Marshall Eriksen (Jason Segel), and Barney Stinson (Neil Patrick Harris)	Nominated	
People's Choice Awards	2014	Favorite TV Gal Pals	Lily Aldrin (Alyson Hannigan) and Robin Scherbatsky (Cobie Smulders)	Nominated	
Primetime Emmy Awards	2007	Outstanding Supporting Actor in a Comedy Series	Neil Patrick Harris	Nominated	
Primetime Emmy Awards	2008	Outstanding Supporting Actor in a Comedy Series	Neil Patrick Harris	Nominated	
Primetime Emmy Awards	2009	Outstanding Comedy Series	How I Met Your Mother (Note: Nominees: Carter Bays, Craig Thomas, Pamela Fryman, and Greg Malins (executive producers); Stephen Lloyd, Chris Harris, Chuck Tatham, and Suzy Mamann Greenberg (co-executive producers); Jamie Rhonheimer, Kourtney Kang, and Theresa Mulligan (supervising producers))	Nominated	
Primetime Emmy Awards	2009	Outstanding Supporting Actor in a Comedy Series	Neil Patrick Harris	Nominated	
Primetime Emmy Awards	2010	Outstanding Supporting Actor in a Comedy Series	Neil Patrick Harris	Nominated	
Primetime Emmy Awards	2011	Outstanding Directing for a Comedy Series	Pamela Fryman (for "Subway Wars")	Nominated	
Primetime Creative Arts Emmy Awards	2006	Outstanding Art Direction for a Multi-Camera Series	Stephan Olson and Richard C. Walker (for "Pilot")	Won	
Primetime Creative Arts Emmy Awards	2006	Outstanding Cinematography for a Multi-Camera Series	Christian La Fountaine (for "The Limo")	Won	
Primetime Creative Arts Emmy Awards	2007	Outstanding Art Direction for a Multi-Camera Series	Stephan Olson and Susan Eschelbach (for "Aldrin Justice", "Something Borrowed", and "Something Blue")	Won	
Primetime Creative Arts Emmy Awards	2007	Outstanding Multi-Camera Picture Editing for a Series	Sue Federman (for "Robin Sparkles" (Note: Also known as "Slap Bet"))	Nominated	
Primetime Creative Arts Emmy Awards	2008	Outstanding Art Direction for a Multi-Camera Series	Stephan Olson and Susan Eschelbach (for "The Yips", "No Tomorrow", and "Miracles")	Won	
Primetime Creative Arts Emmy Awards	2009	Outstanding Art Direction for a Multi-Camera Series	Stephan Olson and Susan Eschelbach (for "Shelter Island" and "Not a Father's Day")	Won	
Primetime Creative Arts Emmy Awards	2009	Outstanding Picture Editing for a Comedy Series (Single or Multi-Camera)	Sue Federman (for "The Naked Man")	Nominated	
Primetime Creative Arts Emmy Awards	2010	Outstanding Art Direction for a Multi-Camera Series	Stephan Olson and Susan Eschelbach (for "Duel Citizenship")	Nominated	
Primetime Creative Arts Emmy Awards	2010	Outstanding Hairstyling for a Multi-Camera Series or Special	Grace Hernandez Leider and Jennifer Guerrero-Mazursky (for "Doppelgangers")	Nominated	
Primetime Creative Arts Emmy Awards	2010	Outstanding Original Music and Lyrics	Carter Bays and Craig Thomas (for "Nothing Suits Me Like a Suit" from "Girls Versus Suits")	Nominated	
Primetime Creative Arts Emmy Awards	2011	Outstanding Art Direction for a Multi-Camera Series	Stephan Olson and Susan Eschelbach (for "Subway Wars")	Nominated	
Primetime Creative Arts Emmy Awards	2011	Outstanding Cinematography for a Multi-Camera Series	Chris La Fountaine (for "Hopeless")	Nominated	
Primetime Creative Arts Emmy Awards	2011	Outstanding Makeup for a Multi-Camera Series or Special (Non-Prosthetic)	Jennifer Turchi, Megan Moore, and Bradley M. Look (for "Bad News")	Nominated	
Primetime Creative Arts Emmy Awards	2011	Outstanding Picture Editing for a Comedy Series (Single or Multi-Camera)	Sue Federman (for "Subway Wars")	Won	
Primetime Creative Arts Emmy Awards	2012	Outstanding Art Direction for a Multi-Camera Series	Stephan Olson and Susan Eschelbach (for "Now We're Even", "The Magician's Code, Part 1", and "The Magician's Code, Part 2")	Nominated	
Primetime Creative Arts Emmy Awards	2012	Outstanding Cinematography for a Multi-Camera Series	Chris La Fountaine (for "46 Minutes")	Nominated	
Primetime Creative Arts Emmy Awards	2012	Outstanding Makeup for a Multi-Camera Series or Special (Non-Prosthetic)	Jennifer Turchi Nigh, Megan Moore, and Kevin Haney (for "Trilogy Time")	Nominated	
Primetime Creative Arts Emmy Awards	2012	Outstanding Multi-Camera Picture Editing for a Comedy Series	Sue Federman (for "Trilogy Time")	Won	
Primetime Creative Arts Emmy Awards	2013	Outstanding Art Direction for a Multi-Camera Series	Stephan Olson and Susan Eschelbach (for "Farhampton", "P.S. I Love You", and "The Final Page, Part 2")	Nominated	
Primetime Creative Arts Emmy Awards	2013	Outstanding Cinematography for a Multi-Camera Series	Chris La Fountaine (for "The Final Page, Part 2")	Won	
Primetime Creative Arts Emmy Awards	2013	Outstanding Makeup for a Multi-Camera Series or Special (Non-Prosthetic)	Jennifer Turchi Nigh, Megan Moore, Brian Sipe, Cheryl Calo, and Renee Napolitano (for "P.S. I Love You")	Nominated	
Primetime Creative Arts Emmy Awards	2013	Outstanding Multi-Camera Picture Editing for a Comedy Series	Sue Federman (for "P.S. I Love You")	Won	
Primetime Creative Arts Emmy Awards	2014	Outstanding Cinematography for a Multi-Camera Series	Chris La Fountaine (for "Daisy")	Won	
Primetime Creative Arts Emmy Awards	2014	Outstanding Multi-Camera Picture Editing for a Comedy Series	Sue Federman (for "Gary Blauman")	Nominated	
Prism Awards	2010	Comedy Series	How I Met Your Mother (for "Last Cigarette Ever")	Won	
Prism Awards	2010	Performance in a Comedy Series	Neil Patrick Harris	Nominated	
Satellite Awards	2009	Best Television Series, Comedy or Musical	How I Met Your Mother	Nominated	
Satellite Awards	2009	Best Actor in a Supporting Role in a Series, Miniseries or Motion Picture Made for Television	Neil Patrick Harris	Nominated	
Satellite Awards	2010	Best Actor in a Supporting Role in a Series, Miniseries or Motion Picture Made for Television	Neil Patrick Harris	Nominated	
Satellite Awards	2011	Best Actor in a Supporting Role in a Series, Miniseries or Motion Picture Made for Television	Neil Patrick Harris	Nominated	
TCA Awards	2009	Outstanding Achievement in Comedy	How I Met Your Mother	Nominated	
TCA Awards	2009	Individual Achievement in Comedy	Neil Patrick Harris	Nominated	
Teen Choice Awards	2007	Choice TV Actor: Comedy	Neil Patrick Harris	Nominated	
Teen Choice Awards	2008	Choice TV Show: Comedy	How I Met Your Mother	Nominated	
Teen Choice Awards	2008	Choice TV Actor: Comedy	Neil Patrick Harris	Nominated	
Teen Choice Awards	2009	Choice TV Show: Comedy	How I Met Your Mother	Nominated	
Teen Choice Awards	2009	Choice TV Actor: Comedy	Neil Patrick Harris	Nominated	
Teen Choice Awards	2012	Choice TV Actor: Comedy	Neil Patrick Harris	Nominated	
Writers Guild of America Awards	2015	On-Air Promotion (Television, New Media or Radio)	Dan Greenberger	Won	
Young Artist Awards	2011	Best Performance in a TV Series – Guest Starring Young Actor 10 and Under	Riley Thomas Stewart	Nominated	
Young Artist Awards	2014	Best Performance in a TV Series – Guest Starring Young Actress 10 and Under	Kyla-Drew Simmons	Nominated	
