= The Platinum Rule =

The Platinum Rule may refer to:

- A variation of the Golden Rule
- The Platinum Rule (How I Met Your Mother), an episode of the TV show How I Met Your Mother
