= Shelter Island (How I Met Your Mother) =

- How I Met Your Mother episode
- Episode no.: Season 4 Episode 5
- Directed by: Pamela Fryman
- Written by: Chris Harris
- Production code: 4ALH05
- Original air date: October 20, 2008

Guest appearances
- Jason Jones as Tony; Annie Abrams as Desk Clerk; Danneel Harris as Nora; Derek Shizuto as Host; Aaron Hendry as Juice Bar Guy

Episode chronology
← Previous "Intervention"	Next → "Happily Ever After"
- How I Met Your Mother season 4

"Shelter Island" is the fifth episode in the fourth season of the television series How I Met Your Mother and 69th overall. It originally aired on October 20, 2008.

== Plot ==
Marshall, Lily and Barney are at MacLaren's when Ted and Stella arrive. Stella is upset because her sister is stealing her dream wedding on Shelter Island, marrying a vegan man Stella hates. Ted and Stella meet her sister, who tells them her fiancé has run off with another woman. Ted and Stella then have what they each think is a clear nonverbal conversation, but they both misunderstand what the other one is trying to say. While Ted thinks he is agreeing to pay for dinner, Stella tells her sister they will take over her wedding and all the arrangements so they do not go to waste.

At the bar, Barney is surprisingly supportive of Ted's marriage. He tells Lily it will be a good opportunity to hook up with Robin, who is living in Japan but has agreed to return for the wedding. Robin's job in Japan has turned out to be a ridiculous farce involving more camera time spend on her chimpanzee co-hosts than on news reporting, which disappoints her.

The day before the wedding, the group travels to Shelter Island only to find that the venue is a yoga resort, which disappointingly serves only vegan food and non-alcoholic drinks. Stella finds out Robin has been invited to the wedding, which makes her angry and uncomfortable, as Robin is Ted's ex. She says that her ex Tony would be the last person she would want at her and Ted's wedding and then asks Ted to uninvite Robin. Barney calls Robin. She has not left Japan yet, but he lies and tells the others she is already on the plane.

Stella tells Ted that Tony is refusing to bring their daughter Lucy to the wedding. Ted decides to go meet with Tony to try to convince him to change his mind. Barney meets Stella's sister, who propositions him. Barney tries to resist, thinking of Robin. Ted convinces Tony to let Lucy come to the wedding, but after he cries about losing Stella to Ted, Ted ends up taking pity on him and invites him as well. At the wedding venue, Stella is upset to see Tony, and Robin's arrival makes things worse.

Ted and Stella argue about the possibility of unresolved feelings about their exes. They agree to tell both Tony and Robin they cannot attend the wedding. Although Stella wants Ted to talk to Tony and offers to talk to Robin herself, Ted goes to talk to Robin instead and suggests Stella talk to Tony. Robin is relieved and agrees that it is weird for her to be at the wedding. She tells him that she quit her job in Japan and is moving back to New York City. She reminds him about their romantic history and warns him not to rush into getting married, which upsets Ted. Robin goes to see Barney, but he has a woman in his room, so she leaves. Stella's sister arrives and joins Barney with the other woman.

On the morning of Ted and Stella's wedding, Ted finds a card from Stella saying she has run away with Tony. Marshall, Lily and Barney try to console Ted, while Robin sees Stella and Tony together on the ferry from Shelter Island. Ted finally understands that Stella was not really worried about Robin coming to the wedding, but was thinking about her unresolved issues with Tony.

== Production ==
In an interview for Television Without Pity, series co-creator Craig Thomas praised guest star Jason Jones, saying that they "all just dorked out" when casting him because they were such fans of The Daily Show. They then thanked the latter program for its coverage of the 2008 election.

== Critical response ==
Noel Murray of The A.V. Club gave the episode a B+, noting that it was "way too rushed".

Michelle Zoromski of IGN rated it 7/10, summarizing that it was "bland" and "unmemorable".
