= The Rebound Girl =

- How I Met Your Mother episode
- Episode no.: Season 7 Episode 11
- Directed by: Pamela Fryman
- Written by: Carter Bays; Craig Thomas
- Original air date: November 21, 2011

Guest appearances
- Wayne Brady as James; Jai Rodriguez as Tom; Ernie Hudson as himself

Episode chronology
← Previous "Tick, Tick, Tick..."	Next → "Symphony of Illumination"
- How I Met Your Mother (season 7)

"The Rebound Girl" is the 11th episode of the seventh season of the CBS sitcom How I Met Your Mother, and the 147th episode overall. It aired on November 21, 2011.

== Plot ==
Ted and Barney have been drinking and they decide to adopt a child as "bros". When an argument ensues, Barney storms out and Ted attempts to apologize the next day, but is surprised to see Barney with a baby. While Ted is worried about where the baby came from, he is swayed into keeping her when he notices how much female attention he and Barney attract with her.

Marshall and Lily drop by the house they were given by her grandparents in Long Island, which they are planning to sell. After returning to their New York City apartment, they perceive it to be much smaller than before, and they decide to move to the Long Island house. When Robin learns of their decision, she is shocked and afraid of losing "the gang". In an effort to change their minds, she reminds them of the time when Marshall almost purchased an abandoned fire-house and became a Ghostbuster after encountering the signs: the ambulance, the firehouse, and Ernie Hudson.

When the three arrive at the house to prepare for Thanksgiving, Robin locks herself in their bathroom and refuses to leave until they change their minds. Marshall soon becomes worried about her and knocks on the bathroom window to find out what is going on and why she is not reacting well to the thought of him and Lily moving. Robin says that maybe she need needs them more than they think. When Marshall asks if this is about more than them moving, she does not respond.

When Barney and Ted arrive at Marshall and Lily's house with the baby, Lily is shocked. She manages to convince Ted this is not a good idea. Barney's brother, James, and his husband arrive, and the child is their daughter, Sadie, who Barney offered to babysit after inviting James and his family for Thanksgiving. James tells Ted he almost adopted a baby with a female friend, but once they met their life partners, they were both happy that they had not followed through with the plan. Ted tells Barney that he no longer wishes to adopt, saying that they need to find their soulmates first before they can think about having kids. Barney leaves to take a walk, but when he sees Robin through the bathroom window, he climbs inside to talk to her. Robin then blurts out that she is pregnant.

== Critical response ==
The A.V. Club's Katherine Miller graded the episode a B+. This episode attracted 10.01 million viewers.
