= Good Crazy =

- How I Met Your Mother episode
- Episode no.: Season 7 Episode 22
- Directed by: Pamela Fryman
- Written by: Carter Bays and Craig Thomas
- Original air date: April 30, 2012

Guest appearances
- Becki Newton as Quinn; K Callan as Grandma Lois; Bruce Gray as Yuthers; Karissa Vacker as Holly; Todd Sandler as Darryl; Casey Washington as Larry; Cristen Irene as Robyn; Katy Stoll as Lizbeth; Mike Nojun Park as Waiter; Michael G. Coleman as Lou

Episode chronology
| ← Previous "Now We're Even" | Next → "The Magician's Code – Part 1" |
- How I Met Your Mother (season 7)

"Good Crazy" is the 22nd episode of the seventh season of the CBS sitcom How I Met Your Mother, and the 158th episode overall.

== Plot ==
Barney's relationship with Quinn is strained as he overreacts whenever he thinks her job is mentioned. After two of Quinn's regular customers greet her on the sidewalk, Barney fires a top GNB employee and offers Quinn a job at the bank as an "executive strategy coordinator", so she can earn income without having to strip. Seeing that Barney is trying to dictate her career, Quinn asks for some time to think and leaves Barney, who reinstates the employee.

Lily and Marshall hold their baby shower. Ted and Robin separately miss the shower on purpose to avoid seeing each other. Barney encourages Ted to try online dating and sets him up with three specific women. Over the course of each date, Ted suddenly visualizes Robin sitting in front of him and is determined to get her out of his mind even if his dates find him weird. On the third date, Ted finds out that his date, Holly, needed someone to get her over a recent breakup, which leads them to sleeping together. Ted goes back to MacLaren's and tries to order a drink, but sees Robin as the bartender and as a nearby patron. Both pseudo-Robins encourage him to find Robin and make amends.

With the baby's impending birth, Marshall conditions himself for various parenthood situations by using a watermelon as a practice baby. Lily is not happy with what he is doing and applies for a two-day parental workshop. Marshall dozes off seeing Lily as the driver but wakes up hours later with Barney behind the wheel. Barney explains that Lily asked him to help trick Marshall into taking a vacation in Atlantic City so Marshall could unwind. At a casino, Barney proposes wearing the Ducky Tie again if they can turn off their phones for one hour and drink 100 tequila shots.

As Robin pulls up to McLaren's in a taxi, Ted tells her that they need to talk; she tells him that now is not a good time. In Atlantic City, a drunk Marshall madly tosses poker chips around the casino floor while Barney turns his phone back on and sees 17 voicemails – all coming from Lily, who is now in labor and wants them back in New York immediately.

== Critical reception ==
Donna Bowman of The A.V. Club gave the episode a B−, stating that Barney's role worked well for the characters.

Ethan Alter of Television Without Pity graded the episode a C.

Adam Vitcavage of Paste Magazine had said that "If anything, this wasn’t a huge episode, but it was the introduction to what is building up to be one of the most important season finales in HIMYM history." He also praised the cleaned up up-in-the-air relationship between Ted and Robin which ends up with Ted finding another wife.
