= Wait for It (How I Met Your Mother) =

- How I Met Your Mother episode
- Episode no.: Season 3 Episode 1
- Directed by: Pamela Fryman
- Written by: Craig Thomas & Carter Bays
- Production code: 3ALH01
- Original air date: September 24, 2007

Guest appearances
- Enrique Iglesias as Gael; Mandy Moore as Amy; Amanda Loncar as Lydia; David Henrie as Son; Lyndsy Fonseca as Daughter

Episode chronology
← Previous "Something Blue"	Next → "We're Not from Here"
- How I Met Your Mother season 3

"Wait for It" is the first episode in the third season of the television series How I Met Your Mother and 45th episode overall. It originally aired on CBS on September 24, 2007.

== Plot ==
Future Ted narrates to his children about the journey to becoming the man ready to meet their mother, beyond the simple tale of a yellow umbrella. At Marshall and Lily's wedding, Barney encourages Ted to "conquer New York," but Ted hesitates until Robin returns with a new boyfriend, Gael, sparking Ted to prove he's moved on. Ted, with Barney's help, aims to outdo Robin by dating someone impressive, ending up with Amy, a tattooed girl played by Mandy Moore.

Lily and Marshall, attempting to dislike Gael for Ted's sake during a double date, find themselves charmed by Gael's allure. Ted, focusing on Amy, impulsively gets a tattoo, leading to a humorous revelation the next morning of a butterfly tattoo on his lower back, shared with Barney, Lily, and Marshall.

Ted confronts Robin, feeling outpaced in their breakup, but learns Robin struggled with their split, soothing his ego with a peculiar reassurance about his physical attributes, leading Ted to claim victory over the breakup.

The episode closes with Barney anxiously anticipating the next slap from Marshall, as part of their ongoing Slap Bet, marking a countdown to an inevitable comedic moment.

== Critical response ==
Donna Bowman of The A.V. Club rated the episode B+.

Staci Krause of IGN gave the episode 8.7 out of 10.

Joel Keller of TV Squad originally said Moore "doesn't pull [her hard-ass role] off", although later said, that she wasn't too bad.
