= Ten Sessions =

- How I Met Your Mother episode
- Episode no.: Season 3 Episode 13
- Directed by: Pamela Fryman
- Written by: Chris Harris and Carter Bays & Craig Thomas
- Production code: 3ALH14
- Original air date: March 24, 2008

Guest appearances
- Sarah Chalke as Stella; Britney Spears as Abby; Marshall Manesh as Ranjit

Episode chronology
← Previous "No Tomorrow"	Next → "The Bracket"
- How I Met Your Mother season 3

"Ten Sessions" is the 13th episode of the third season of How I Met Your Mother, and the 57th episode overall of the series. It originally aired on March 24, 2008 on CBS. The episode was written by series co-creators Carter Bays and Craig Thomas, and directed by Pamela Fryman. In the episode, Ted is repeatedly rejected by his dermatologist Stella for a date, so Stella's receptionist, Abby, becomes interested in him.

In March 2008, it was announced that American recording artist Britney Spears would make a guest appearance on the show as Abby. Alongside Spears, "Ten Sessions" featured guest appearances from Sarah Chalke and Marshall Manesh. Television critics reacted positively to the episode, who praised the storyline and Spears' performance. According to the Nielsen ratings, "Ten Sessions" was watched by 10.62 million viewers, which was the show's highest rating for the third season of the series.

== Plot ==
Ted is at the clinic to remove his lower-back butterfly tattoo, where he is attracted to his doctor, Stella (Sarah Chalke). They agree to go to a movie, Plan 9 from Outer Space, but Ted does not realize Stella had brought her friends along with her and it was not a date. At the next session, Ted suggests waiting until his ten tattoo removal sessions are over before asking her out, but Stella tells him she will still say no. Even though the first five sessions go well with Ted and Stella getting to know each other better, Stella confirms her answer is still no. Ted tries to show Stella his good side by being nice to the receptionist, Abby (Britney Spears), but instead, Abby starts to show interest in him. Then, Ted tries using a self-help book he saw in Stella's clinic, but she reveals it is not her book and she detests it, while Abby confirms that Ted was reading the book in the reception.

Robin and Barney suggest that Ted give up on Stella and instead focus on Abby. Barney claims to a disbelieving Ted that he made an appointment with Stella to meet her and discovered that she is only attracted to men with mustaches. Ted grows a mustache to impress Stella, which only causes her to laugh at him (a year earlier, Barney had made a ten-dollar bet with Ted that he could get him to grow a mustache). Lily tells an embarrassed Ted to try again, as Stella is interested in him, though she says she has not been to see her. It is then revealed that Marshall had gone to see Stella to talk up Ted, and found out Stella had a crush on him; Marshall left his self-help book at her clinic. Happy that Stella is interested in him, Ted asks her out after his last session, but she says she does not have time for dating because she has a daughter. However, Ted soon realizes that she did not actually say the word "no".

Recalling Stella saying that she only has two minutes out for lunch every day, Ted takes her out on a "two-minute date" – to dinner at a table at the café next door to her practice and "the important parts" of Manos: The Hands of Fate at the electronics store two doors down, with help from Ranjit (Marshall Manesh) and Wendy the Waitress. The date goes well, and Stella kisses Ted and promises to call him if she ever has time. Finally, Abby sees Ted outside the clinic holding flowers he tried to give to Stella, and chases him down the street. At the reception, Abby complains to Barney about how Ted toyed with her emotions, after which she and Barney go out to have sex.

== Production ==
"Ten Sessions" was written by series co-creators Carter Bays and Craig Thomas, and directed by Pamela Fryman. In early March 2008, it was confirmed that singer Britney Spears would guest star on the show. Neil Patrick Harris was "shocked" that Spears was willing to "come and do some acting", noting that she had not acted in a while. Spears's last acting role was on Will & Grace in 2006. Harris told Entertainment Tonight that the paparazzi would not be a problem, since the show is shot on the Fox secure lot. Before Sarah Chalke was given the role as Stella, Alicia Silverstone was originally set to guest star, but dropped out when her representatives feared she would be "overshadowed" by Spears. Co-creators Carter Bays and Craig Thomas "love" Silverstone and hoped she would eventually guest star on the show, although she never did.

Alyson Hannigan said that Spears "was so funny" and that she had "no idea she [Spears] had such great comic timing". According to Jason Segel, Spears improvised a few lines that were "really good" and set "everyone laughing". Spears was nominated for a People's Choice Award in the Favorite Scene-Stealing Guest Star category for her performance in the episode. "Ten Sessions" first aired on CBS in the United States on March 24, 2008. Spears's wardrobe in the episode was put up for an online auction to benefit the Natural Resources Defense Council. The auction began just after the episode aired and would be going on for a week. The yellow Nanette Lepore lace dress Spears wore in the episode was sold for US$1,525, and the embroidered rust dress was sold for US$1,925.

== Reception ==
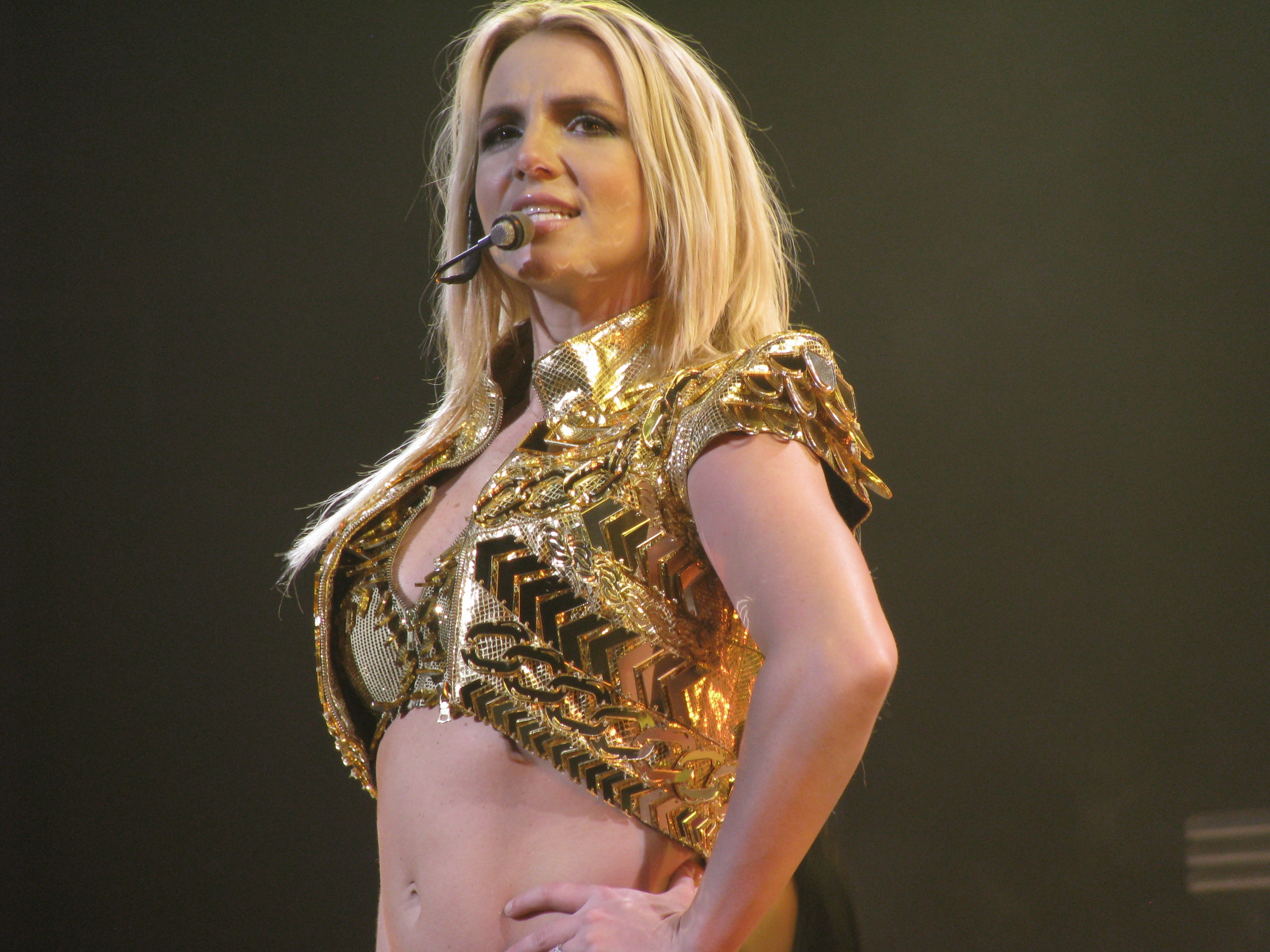
Critics commended Spears for her performance in the episode.

In its original broadcast in the United States, "Ten Sessions" was watched by 10.62 million viewers according to the Nielsen ratings. It attracted 1 million more viewers than the previous episode, and 2.4 million more than the show's average before the writer's strike. The episode achieved a 4.5/12 rating in the key 18–49 demographic among adults, and was the fourth highest-rated show of the evening; it subsequently achieved the show's highest rating ever in the 18–49 demographic. Show co-creator Bays later said that Britney Spears' appearance greatly benefited ratings: "And by golly she put our show on the map. It can't be overstated. Britney Spears rescued us from ever being on the bubble again. Thanks Britney!"

Spears' appearance was critically acclaimed by most critics. David Hinckley of New York Daily News echoed similar sentiments, avouching that she "proved [that] she can act every bit as well as she can sing". Michelle Zoromski of IGN argued however that while Spears' appearance was a "nice change of pace from her latest public appearances", it was nonetheless a "bit clunky and not as seamless as other guest roles have been on the show". Donna Bowman of The A.V. Club was also less enthusiastic about the singer's performance. Bowman opined: "The Big Britney Episode, as it will henceforth be known, wasn't really much to get all huffy over. You can say this for the [How I Met Your Mother] team: They tend to minimize the annoyance factor of their special guest stars. Britney was a sideshow, and she got her couple of laughs, but she didn't hog the screen time."

Along with Spears's performance specifically, "Ten Sessions" as a whole was generally well received by television critics. In television critics Alan Sepinwall and Matt Zoller Seitz's 2016 book TV (The Book), Sepinwall singles out this episode (along with "Slap Bet") as episodes where he "will still laugh, and be touched, and marvel at just how inventive a traditional-looking sitcom can be". Bowman gave the episode a 'B' grade, and was more critical of "Ten Sessions". She expressed: "the timing wasn't spot-on all the way through 'Ten Sessions'. The episode was slow starting, and as with many of the series' 'Ted is a master of romance' attempts, the two-minute date seemed as likely to be annoying-quirky as endearing-quirky, if you were the one being wooed. I wanted to like it more than I did. Maybe it almost works because Elliot on Scrubs would have really liked it, ditzy romantic that she is. But no—it's just an ounce heavy on the trying-too-hard scale." In contrast, Zoromski gave the episode an 8.9 out of ten, signifying a "great" rating. He thought that the episode was superior to the previous episode, adding that the show returned to full form.
