= Woooo! =

- How I Met Your Mother episode
- Episode no.: Season 4 Episode 8
- Directed by: Pamela Fryman
- Written by: Craig Thomas; Carter Bays
- Production code: 4ALH09
- Original air date: November 17, 2008

Guest appearances
- Bryan Callen as Bilson; Erika Medina as Stacey; Jamie-Lynn Sigler as Jillian

Episode chronology
← Previous "Not a Father's Day"	Next → "The Naked Man"
- How I Met Your Mother season 4

"Woooo!" is the eighth episode in the fourth season of the television series How I Met Your Mother and 72nd overall. It originally aired on November 17, 2008.

== Plot ==
Barney tells Ted that Goliath National Bank is renovating their main building and that he is trying to convince his boss to give Ted's architecture firm a chance to pitch a design. Ted faces competition from a Swedish architecture collective called Sven, a company he already hates. Excited at the prospect of the three of them working together, Marshall says they should include Ted in the "conference call", an excuse he and Barney use to go up to the roof and drink beer. Future Ted, meanwhile, explains that this is his big shot to fulfill his dream of adding a building to the New York City skyline.

Ted presents his ideas to the board of GNB, and leaves feeling optimistic about his chances. Later that night, Barney tells him they decided to go with Sven's design. Ted is particularly upset after the bad couple of months he just had, so he, Barney and Marshall decide to go urinate on the current GNB building. At GNB, Marshall tells Bilson that even though they did not pick him, Ted is still a great architect. When Bilson replies that he voted for Ted, Marshall grabs Barney for a conference call to confront him. Barney explains that Ted's pitch was good but he was swayed by Sven, who offered a building shaped like a Tyrannosaurus rex and promised to give Barney a button to make it breathe fire, as well as putting in a strip club. Marshall is so upset he abandons Barney and locks him outside on the roof alone.

Still unemployed, Robin seeks solace in hanging out with Lily, but she is upset that Marshall is always there. Lily suggests that Robin come with her to a birthday party for Jillian, a second grade teacher at Lily's school. Robin and Lily arrive at a western-style bar for Jillian's party, where they are shocked to find out that Jillian is actually a "woo girl": a single girl who loves to go out partying and constantly shouts "Woooooo!". Later, Robin starts hanging out with the woo girls so she can have fun with other unmarried women. Lily tries to hang out with Robin by becoming a woo girl, but cannot get it right. Robin explains that Lily cannot be a woo girl because she is happy. Robin translates each of the girl's woos and shows that each of them is miserable, as is Ted, who also appears at the bar after losing his contract. She also tells Lily that at the moment, Robin is like them, being unemployed and single. Lily promises to make more time for Robin and to try to get away from Marshall now and then.

Barney invites the Svens to a conference call, but finds they do not understand what he is doing. Feeling bad about betraying his friend, Barney has GNB fire Sven and hire Ted. At the bar, Barney is about to explain that it was his fault Ted did not get the job in the first place when Marshall stops him, blaming Bilson. Marshall soon caves in and tells Ted the truth, so Ted ties Barney to a mechanical bull which was set to the maximum speed (after finding out that Barney has an inner ear problem) and goes home. Barney is freed three hours later, but is so dizzy he misses out on a threesome with Jillian and her "woo girl" friend (who was intending to find "that guy Ted").

== Critical response ==
Donna Bowman of The A.V. Club gave the episode an A−, complaining about the unnecessary computer-generated effects (used for the T-Rex building and the pigeons on the rooftop), but praising the "crackerjack comic timing" and "solid script structure".

Michelle Zoromski of IGN rated it 8.7/10, complimenting the "wordplay" used in the dialogue between Robin and Lily.

In August 2022, a play by Alica Daine Benning partially inspired by this episode entitled Woo Girls! had a workshop production at Chicago's Factory Theater. The basic premise is five women reuniting in a Chicago bar five years after graduating from high school. In the author's notes to the online program, Benning states that the play initially made the characters more annoying as she found them in real life. After writing the first draft, she saw this episode and found it unfunny and insulting to women and rewrote the play to make the characters more relatable. The play's logline states: "Over the course of one ill-fated Girls’ Night Out, five unhinged women are forced to acknowledge their relationships to patriarchy in order to reconnect with each other and save their friendship."
