= Where Were We? (How I Met Your Mother) =

- How I Met Your Mother episode
- Episode no.: Season 2 Episode 1
- Directed by: Pamela Fryman
- Written by: Carter Bays & Craig Thomas
- Production code: 2ALH01
- Original air date: September 18, 2006

Guest appearance
- George Clinton as Himself

Episode chronology
← Previous "Come On"	Next → "The Scorpion and the Toad"
- How I Met Your Mother season 2

"Where Were We?" is the first episode in the second season of the television series How I Met Your Mother. It originally aired on September 18, 2006 on CBS. (also referred as “Columbia Phonographic Broadcasting System” or “Columbia Broadcasting System.)

== Plot ==
Ted is happy in his new relationship with Robin, while Marshall wallows in depression following his breakup with Lily; which makes Marshall unintentionally more depressed. Barney is unhappy with all of them, being forced to endure either Ted and Robin being cutesy together or Marshall lamenting the loss of Lily. After 40 days, Marshall has yet to leave the apartment, and Robin, Ted, and Barney discuss the situation. Barney attempts to cheer Marshall up by taking him to a strip club, arguing that Marshall is not truly over Lily because he can still picture her naked. However, Marshall can only think about Lily, ensuring how deeply he is still attached to her. Ted later takes Marshall to a New York Yankees vs. Cleveland Indians baseball game, hoping sports will distract him. When a nearby couple becomes engaged during the game, Marshall emotionally breaks down and throws a hot dog at them.

Robin, who has been hiding from Ted the fact that she likes guns, takes Marshall to a firing range, which cheers him up a little. However, his good mood is short-lived when he finds one of Lily's credit card bills in the mail. Barney tells Marshall to look at her online credit card bills to see more recent charges, and Marshall discovers charges for a hotel in New York. Despite Ted's best efforts, Marshall calls the hotel, and a man, presumably her new boyfriend, answers the phone in Lily's room. Marshall decides to go to the hotel to beg Lily to take him back. Still, Ted finally loses patience and yells at him that he is pathetic and has spent too much time wallowing in self-pity and that going to Lily in his current state will ruin any chance he has of ever getting back together with her. Marshall agrees not to go to the hotel, and Ted and Robin leave for a romantic weekend after persuading Barney to look after Marshall. Ted calls Barney to see how Marshall is doing, but Barney, having taken Marshall to another strip club, realizes that Marshall is gone. Ted and Robin turn around and head to the hotel.

At the hotel bar, Ted finds Marshall, who reveals that he already went to Lily’s room and punched the man who answered the phone. It is later revealed that the man was not Lily’s boyfriend but a criminal who had stolen her credit card and was arrested for multiple counts of identity theft.

Although relieved that Lily does not have a new partner, Marshall is crushed to learn that the last connection he believed he had to her was false. Ted reminds Marshall of their college years before Lily entered his life and encourages him not to let the breakup define him.

However, one week later (two months after his breakup with Lily), Robin and Ted wake up one Sunday morning to find Marshall making the pancakes Lily used to make, thus taking the first big step to learning to live without her. As Marshall begins going out again, Lily appears at MacLaren's one night. She sees her friends having drinks and considers going in, but despondently leaves unnoticed after seeing how happy Marshall is without her.

== Critical response ==
The episode received generally positive reviews from television critics. Joel Keller of TV Squad described the episode as a “very strong opening to the season,” suggesting that the series showed potential to become “a monster hit” with minor improvements. Keller praised the emotional weight of Marshall’s storyline and the balance between comedy and character development.

Brian Zoromski of IGN gave the episode a positive review, highlighting Jason Segel performance as Marshall and noting that the episode successfully blended heartbreak with humor. Zoromski commented that the premiere demonstrated stronger emotional storytelling compared to much of the first season.

== Themes and character development ==
The episode “Where Were We?” explores grief and heartbreak after a long-term relationship, emotional dependency, and the difficulty of change. Marshall’s arc represents the first stage of personal growth after loss, while Ted’s confrontation shows a shift in their friendship dynamic. Lily’s silent return at the end establishes tension that continues throughout the season.
