= The Bracket =

- How I Met Your Mother episode
- Episode no.: Season 3 Episode 14
- Directed by: Pamela Fryman
- Written by: Joe Kelly
- Production code: 3ALH13
- Original air date: March 31, 2008

Guest appearances
- Chris Tallman as Mark; Maïté Schwartz as Holly; April Bowlby as Meg; Dawn Olivieri as Anna; Ken Barnett as Colton Dunn; Brendan Patrick Connor as Janitor; Yvonne DeLaRosa as Charna; Katy Savoy as Karen; Kathy Uyen as Julia; Hallie Lambert as Kate; Tess Alexandra Parker (Mysterious Woman)

Episode chronology
← Previous "Ten Sessions"	Next → "The Chain of Screaming"
- How I Met Your Mother season 3

"The Bracket" is the 14th episode in the third season of the television series How I Met Your Mother and 58th overall. It originally aired on March 31, 2008.

== Plot ==
Barney attempts to track down and identify a woman who is stalking him in order to warn women he picks up from having sex with him. He narrows down a list of 64 women most likely to want revenge, then has the gang help him eliminate possibilities tournament style. Lily, the only person who has seen the stalker, forces him to confront his "final four,” none of whom is the stalker, although the woman from "Ted Mosby, Architect" started tedmosbyisajerk.com under the impression that Barney's identity is Ted's. Lily is irked by Barney’s refusal to apologize to the women he has hurt but Barney reasons that they were consenting adults, he showed them a good time, and remembered each and every one — even going so far as to scrapbook each experience.

Eventually, they concoct a plan where Robin will pretend to be a girl that Barney wants to hook up with, while Lily stays by the jukebox at MacLaren's, and the rest of the guys hang out at the booth. When Barney pretends to go to the bathroom, he notices a woman approaching Robin. Barney finally apologizes to the woman when he thinks that she is the avenger but he does not recall having slept with her. This turns out to be a friend of Robin's, but Lily nonetheless is proud of Barney for finally giving out a sincere apology. The woman warning Barney’s potential conquests is not revealed, but Future Ted reassures that she will be revealed another time.

At the end of the episode, Barney writes of the experience in his oft-mentioned blog in a scene similar to the computerized diary scenes of Doogie Howser, M.D., in which Neil Patrick Harris (Barney) stars. After glancing over at another conquest he snagged through deception, he concludes that the lesson to all this is that he is "awesome.”

== Production ==
The episode was originally named "The Final Four". Many blogs and reviews refer to it by that name.

The tie-in website http://www.tedmosbyisajerk.com was initially bought to prevent it being exploited by cybersquatters, then a simple website was added. Associate producer Carl MacLaren had the idea to do a song for the website, which sprawled into a much longer 20-minute work. The song syncs up slightly with the episode a la the alleged The Dark Side of the Moon/Wizard of Oz sync, which can be seen on the season 3 DVD. The vocals were performed by Charlene Amoia (Wendy the Waitress).

== Critical response ==
Donna Bowman of The A.V. Club gave the episode a B rating.

IGN gave the episode a rating of 7.6 out of 10.

Omar G of Television Without Pity rated the episode A+. It was the only episode of the season rated A+, and described as "one of the best episodes of the show".
