= Architect of Destruction =

- How I Met Your Mother episode
- Episode no.: Season 6 Episode 5
- Directed by: Pamela Fryman
- Written by: Carter Bays; Craig Thomas
- Production code: 6ALH05
- Original air date: October 18, 2010

Guest appearances
- Jennifer Morrison as Zoey Pierson; Geoff Stults as Max; Miss Coco Peru as Drag Queen Streetwalker

Episode chronology
← Previous "Subway Wars"	Next → "Baby Talk"
- How I Met Your Mother season 6

"Architect of Destruction" is the fifth episode of the sixth season of the CBS sitcom How I Met Your Mother, and the 117th episode overall. It originally aired on October 18, 2010.

== Plot ==
Barney is excited that Ted will be designing the new GNB building, which means they will be working together. Barney reveals that a defunct hotel called the Arcadian will be demolished to make way for the GNB building. Ted admits he has become involved in efforts to save the building through a new romantic interest, Zoey, who does not know he is the GNB architect.

Ted joins Zoey in picketing the building, but Barney retaliates by erecting a billboard revealing Ted as the architect of the proposed GNB building. Ted confronts Barney, who admits to revealing the lie in an effort to ruin Ted's chances with Zoey and restore his enthusiasm for the GNB project.

Barney offers Ted complete freedom of vision for the GNB project. Ted redesigns the building, incorporating the facade of the Arcadian in order to prevent it from being demolished. Zoey is thrilled with the compromise. Ted notices her wedding ring for the first time, and she confirms she is married. Ted realizes he was only interested in the Arcadian because of her and throws the new design away.

Meanwhile, Marshall and Lily continue to try to conceive. Robin and Max have hooked up, and Marshall is happy for his former law school friend. Lily tells Marshall that Max has a small penis, which Marshall cannot stop thinking about. On a double date with Robin and Max, Marshall continually references sizes, which is awkward for Robin and Lily, although Max doesn't seem to notice. When Max leaves momentarily, Marshall reprimands Robin and Lily for telling him about Max. He is shocked to learn that Lily tells Robin about her sex life. Robin argues that Marshall probably engages in similar talk with male friends, which Marshall denies. While having sex with Lily, Marshall is haunted by the thought of Lily telling Robin about it, and storms out of the room. Marshall has Lily call Robin later and give a scripted speech about the amazing sex, though Robin recognizes what Marshall is doing.

In the end, as Marshall, Ted, Barney, and Max gather in a locker room, Max states he's thinking of breaking up with Robin due to her odd behavior in the bedroom. Ted and Barney, as her ex-boyfriends, confirm they know what Max is talking about, but when Marshall tries to ask about it, Max scoffs and says "locker room".

== Critical response ==
Donna Bowman of The A.V. Club gave the episode a C+ rating and wonders if there is a connection between the themes of a big building and a small penis.

Robert Canning of IGN gave the episode a score of 8 out of 10.

DeAnn Welker of Television Without Pity gave the episode an A− score.

Chris O'Hara of TVFanatic.com gave the episode a rating of 4 out of 5.
