= No Tomorrow (How I Met Your Mother) =

- How I Met Your Mother episode
- Episode no.: Season 3 Episode 12
- Directed by: Pamela Fryman
- Written by: Craig Thomas; Carter Bays
- Production code: 3ALH12
- Original air date: March 17, 2008

Guest appearances
- Vanessa Minnillo as Ashlee; Terrell Lee as Bouncer

Episode chronology
← Previous "The Platinum Rule"	Next → "Ten Sessions"
- How I Met Your Mother season 3

"No Tomorrow" is the 12th episode in the third season of the television series How I Met Your Mother and 56th overall. It originally aired on March 17, 2008. It was the first episode to air after the 2007–2008 Writers Guild of America strike concluded.

== Plot ==
On Saint Patrick's Day 2008, Ted, Marshall, and Lily plan a board game night, opting out of joining Barney, who dresses in green and goes out alone. Barney convinces Ted to join him for a night out with the promise of no consequences and a date. Meanwhile, Marshall and Robin discover the new apartment floor is crooked, leading to the creation of a game called "roller luge".

Ted experiences a night filled with bad behavior including ditching dates, charging champagne to someone else's tab, and him almost pursuing a one-night stand with a married woman, which ends with him getting punched. Ted wakes up with regrets and a black eye, reflecting on his actions after hearing voicemails he unintentionally left for Marshall.

Ted later retrieves a yellow umbrella from the club, unaware it connects to his future wife, who was also there that night. The episode ends with Barney declaring his awesomeness despite waking up next to a dumpster.

== Critical response ==
Donna Bowman of The A.V. Club rated the episode B+.

Michelle Zoromski of IGN gave the episode 8 out of 10.

Several critics speculated on whether actress Nicole Muirbrook, who is credited as "Woman" in the episode, could be the titular Mother.

Joel Keller of TV Squad described the episode as "above average" and wondered if the show would survive to be renewed for a fourth season. The article also included a poll asking if the woman Ted ran into was the mother or a red herring thrown in by the writers.
