= Farhampton =

- How I Met Your Mother episode
- Episode no.: Season 8 Episode 1
- Directed by: Pamela Fryman
- Written by: Carter Bays; Craig Thomas
- Original air date: September 24, 2012

Guest appearances
- Becki Newton as Quinn; Ashley Williams as Victoria; Michael Trucco as Nick / Secret Crush; Thomas Lennon as Klaus

Episode chronology
← Previous "The Magician's Code"	Next → "The Pre-Nup"
- How I Met Your Mother season 8

"Farhampton" is the premiere episode of the eighth season of the CBS sitcom How I Met Your Mother, and 161st overall. It aired on September 24, 2012, and it gained mixed reviews.

== Plot ==
Sitting alone at a train station in the fictional Hamptons hamlet Farhampton, 10 hours after Barney and Robin's wedding, Ted tells a nearby older woman the story of what has recently happened.

When Robin asked to see him before the ceremonies began, she asks how Barney is doing. Ted tells her that Barney is fully committed to the wedding, even as Barney tries to run away with Marshall and Lily holding him back. Robin says that while Barney will see the wedding through, she is not ready to get married and wonders whether she can go out the window in her wedding dress. Ted narrates to her the story of how he and Victoria fared at her own wedding.

In a flashback to May 2012, future Ted narrates his drive with Victoria, who apparently forgot to leave her fiancé, Klaus, a note stating her decision to run away. Ted decides to drive back to the church—the same one Barney and Robin's wedding will occur in—and forces her to write a note which he will leave at the bride's room. During his initial attempt to infiltrate the church, Ted runs into Klaus' sister Uta. After Barney distracts her with phone sex, Ted leaves the note. He returns to his car only to forget that he left the car keys in the bride's room. As Ted tries to get back in the church, he sees Klaus also escaping and heading to the Farhampton train station, giving Victoria an alibi for her departure.

Meanwhile, Marshall and Lily cannot put their newborn son Marvin to sleep and, out of exhaustion, misinterpret anything Barney, Quinn, and Robin say. Robin and Lily accept Quinn's offer to be her bridesmaids, but Robin is concerned it may be weird between them because of Barney and Robin's history. Her concerns are amplified when Barney reveals that he had doctored or purged all of his mementos from his relationship with Robin to ensure that Quinn will not be jealous. Unfortunately, Lily accidentally reveals that Barney used to date Robin. An angry Quinn gives Barney one minute to explain everything about him and Robin, which he does in less than 52 seconds. Quinn almost leaves the apartment when Robin assures her that she is already seeing someone else. Quinn is not sure if Robin is not going to always want Barney, but after meeting Robin's boyfriend Nick (who was also Robin's secret crush), at MacLaren's, she allows it. While Robin is perplexed at how Barney was able to destroy the memories of their relationship, he gives her a key to a storage unit where he kept all the mementos intact.

Before he and Victoria leave, Ted goes to the train station and asks Klaus why he ran away. Klaus explains that Victoria is a wonderful woman, but she is not "the One" for him, his "lebenslangerschicksalsschatz" (lifelong treasure of destiny). When he asks Ted if he has found "the One", Ted says he thinks he has; but Klaus corrects him, saying that having to think about it means he has not found it yet. Returning to the post-wedding flashforward, as Ted reads Love in the Time of Cholera waiting for the train to come in, the future mother arrives as well with a yellow umbrella, but her face is hidden from view.

== Critical reception ==
The A.V. Club's Donna Bowman said that "the comedy doesn't suffer on account of the many mother-related threads that need to be kept in the weave" and gave the episode a B.

Max Nicholson at IGN wrote that the episode "lacks the classic elements that once made the show so great" and gave the episode 6/10.

Angel Cohn of Television Without Pity graded the episode a D+, calling it "a shitty story with some random non-sequiturs". He added, "the only redeeming thing in this whole episode is the countdown clock that Quinn initiates when she gives Barney a chance to explain himself."
