= Miracles (How I Met Your Mother) =

- How I Met Your Mother episode
- Episode no.: Season 3 Episode 20
- Directed by: Pamela Fryman
- Written by: Craig Thomas; Carter Bays
- Production code: 3ALH20
- Original air date: May 19, 2008

Guest appearances
- John Getz as Bob Hewitt; Doug Benson as Cool Customs Guy; Darcy Rose Byrnes as Lucy; Anthony Palermo as Customs Guy; Sarah Chalke as Stella

Episode chronology
← Previous "Everything Must Go"	Next → "Do I Know You?"
- How I Met Your Mother season 3

"Miracles" is the 20th and final episode of the third season of the CBS television series How I Met Your Mother and 64th overall. It was written by series creators Craig Thomas and Carter Bays, and directed by Pamela Fryman. It originally aired on May 19, 2008.

== Plot ==
While in a cab, Ted is hit by a car speeding through an intersection. The entire gang, except Barney, rush to the hospital and are relieved to find that he is perfectly fine. Ted reveals that he and Stella had gotten into a fight after she invited him to her sister's wedding in six months and he broke up with her, realizing that they could be moving too fast. When the accident occurred, Ted had seen all the things that he loved, allowing him to re-examine his relationship with Stella and realize that he wants her back. Stella arrives in the hospital and reveals she has forgiven Ted. However, when she learns Ted thought they had broken up (while she thought they had only gotten into a small fight), Stella becomes upset and explicitly breaks up with him.

Lily calls Barney to tell him about Ted's accident, but he hangs up before she can tell him that Ted is fine, seemingly not caring. However, it is revealed Barney skipped an important business meeting and ran all the way to the hospital. He ends up getting hit by a bus and breaks nearly all the bones in his body. Touched that Barney was so concerned about him, Ted and Barney finally declare themselves as bros once more. While Marshall and Lily joke about what Barney must have seen when he was hit by the bus, Barney stares longingly at Robin, implying that he loves her. Meanwhile, Marshall attributes Ted and Barney surviving their respective accidents as miracles, a notion Robin dismisses as she does not believe in miracles.

Marshall begins to relate a series of anecdotes (shown in flashbacks) where he believed a miracle had occurred. The stories involve a pencil falling from the ceiling and bouncing into Barney's nose, Marshall successfully smuggling drugs from Amsterdam to the United States due to the customs officer changing shifts while about to have his luggage inspected and Marshall losing his job because of head lice he had gotten from Lily's kindergarten class shortly before Marshall's boss was arrested. Robin dismisses all of Marshall's perceived miracles and reveals why she does not believe in them: when she was a child and her dog was dying, her parents and the veterinarian supposedly saved her dog with a special operation, which "turned" her dog into a turtle. After the nurse tells Ted he can leave, he rushes out to meet Stella, who is at Kiddy Fun Land with her daughter. He gives Stella a small orange kangaroo stuffed animal and explains that he unsuccessfully tried to get a fake diamond ring. Stella is confused as to why he would need a diamond ring, and Ted proposes to her.

== Production ==
In an interview for Television Without Pity, series co-creator Craig Thomas said he always knew he wanted to end a season on a proposal if the show was successful.

== Critical response ==
The episode was received positively. Donna Bowman of The A.V. Club praised the episode, rating the episode A−. Omar of Television Without Pity rated the episode with a grade B+. IGN gave the episode 8.5 out of 10.
