= The Platinum Rule (How I Met Your Mother) =

- How I Met Your Mother episode
- Episode no.: Season 3 Episode 11
- Directed by: Pamela Fryman
- Written by: Craig Thomas & Carter Bays
- Production code: 3ALH11
- Original air date: December 10, 2007

Guest appearances
- Charlene Amoia as Wendy the Waitress; Kristen Schaal as Laura Girard; John Sloan as Michael Girard; Hayes MacArthur as Curt "The Ironman" Irons

Episode chronology
← Previous "The Yips"	Next → "No Tomorrow"
- How I Met Your Mother season 3

"The Platinum Rule" is the 11th episode in the third season of the American television series How I Met Your Mother, and 55th episode overall. Written by Carter Bays and Craig Thomas and directed by Pamela Fryman, it originally aired on CBS on December 10, 2007.

The episode follows Ted Mosby as he plans to date the doctor removing his tattoo, prompting Barney Stinson and the rest of the group to recount experiences in which becoming too close to people they regularly encountered led to awkward consequences. Barney frames their stories around his "Platinum Rule", a rule against dating someone who remains part of everyday life. The episode presents the stories through a series of nested flashbacks, before Ted ultimately rejects Barney's rule and Future Ted proposes "coexistence" as an additional stage.

"The Platinum Rule" was the final new episode broadcast before How I Met Your Mother entered a hiatus during the 2007–08 Writers Guild of America strike. Donna Bowman of The A.V. Club gave the episode a B+, praising its nested-flashback structure and editing, while Television Without Pity awarded it a C+.

== Plot ==
Ted tells the group that he plans to ask his tattoo-removal doctor, Stella, to a movie, but his friends immediately warn him against dating someone he has to see regularly. Barney explains what he calls the "Platinum Rule": avoiding romantic relationships with people who are part of everyday life, because a breakup would leave both people continuing to encounter one another.

To persuade Ted, the group recounts three previous experiences: Marshall and Lily becoming overly involved with their neighbours Michael and Laura, Robin dating her fellow news anchor Curt "The Ironman" Irons, and Barney having a casual relationship with Wendy the Waitress at MacLaren's Pub. Barney organizes their stories into eight stages, with three flashbacks unfolding alongside one another as each relationship progresses from initial attraction to an awkward fallout.

Barney bases his "Platinum Rule" on the Golden Rule, joking that "Love thy neighbor" should instead become “never ever, ever, ever love thy neighbor.” He argues that romantic relationships with people are likely to become awkward if they end. Barney then divides the rule into eight stages, while the group recount their own experiences in an attempt to persuade Ted not to go on the date.

=== The Platinum Rule ===
The eight steps of the process and the group’s examples:

1. Attraction (Marshall and Lily meet their neighboring couple, Michael and Laura, who, like them, loves eating brunch; Curt, an ex hockey player, introduces himself to Robin; Barney realizes how easy it would be to sleep with Wendy)
2. Bargaining (Marshall and Lily plan on inviting Michael and Laura for dinner; Robin realizes she has a crush on Curt; Barney decides to seduce Wendy and announces it to the group, who think he will ruin the bar if he decides to sleep with her)
3. Submission (Marshall and Lily invite Michael and Laura to dinner; Curt invites Robin to a hockey game; Barney finally sleeps with Wendy)
4. Perks (Marshall and Lily explain that it is convenient to have friends who live across the hall (they can go on double dates and have game nights together); Robin tells the group she and Curt could split a cab, they have the same lunch and how Curt got Robin to meet Vancouver Canucks player Mason Raymond; Barney realizes he could get free food)
5. The Tipping Point (Marshall and Lily notice that Michael and Laura always show up when they plan to do things on their own; Robin realizes how clingy Curt actually is; Barney gets upset that he cannot hit on women at MacLaren's anymore)
6. Purgatory (Marshall and Lily finally vent about Michael and Laura and how they always appear when not wanted; Robin complains about how Curt is always leaving love notes everywhere; Barney blames the group for him dating Wendy and tells them about his dismay over sleeping with same women)
7. Confrontation (Marshall and Lily tell Michael and Laura that they are tired of playing charades with them; Robin finally breaks up with Curt; Barney bluntly tells Wendy that he wants to sleep with other women)
8. Fallout (Marshall and Lily run into Michael and Laura while trying to sneak out; Robin is doing a news segment with Curt, who makes a euphemism about how Robin did not deserve his love; Barney believes that Wendy is trying to poison him)

Even after all three experiences are fully recounted, Ted still decides to go on his date. When he gets back, he tells the group that Stella did not consider it a date and that it is actually against AMA rules for her to date patients. Future Ted reflects on the "Platinum Rule" and suggests there is a ninth step: Co-Existence, as we see the other members of the gang begin to do so with those they dated (except for Barney, who still believes that Wendy is trying to kill him). However, he hints that he and Stella would eventually date in the future.

== Critical response ==
Donna Bowman of The A.V. Club gave the episode a B+, praising its nested-flashback structure and the way the three storylines were interwoven across the episode’s eight stages. She also highlighted the episode’s construction and editing, while noting that relatively little happened in terms of the wider storyline.

Television critic Alan Sepinwall responded positively to the episode’s nonlinear structure, describing it as one of the season’s most distinctively How I Met Your Mother-style episodes. He praised the way the three separate stories repeatedly folded into one another, arguing that presenting them sequentially would have made them more predictable.

Omar Gallaga of Television Without Pity gave the episode a grade of C+. In a later retrospective, Den of Geek included “The Platinum Rule” among its ten best episodes of the series, praising its script and multi-year narrative structure.
