= How I Met Your Mother season 3 =

How I Met Your Mother
- Season 3
- The Legendary Season 3 DVD cover art
- Starring: Josh Radnor; Jason Segel; Cobie Smulders; Neil Patrick Harris; Alyson Hannigan
- No. of episodes: 20

Release
- Original network: CBS
- Original release: September 24, 2007 – May 19, 2008

Season chronology
- ← Previous; Season 2 Next → Season 4

The third season of the American television comedy series How I Met Your Mother premiered on September 24, 2007 and concluded on May 19, 2008. It consisted of 20 episodes, each running approximately 22 minutes in length. CBS broadcast the third season on Monday nights at 8:00 pm in the United States until December 10, 2007 when the season was interrupted by the writer's strike. When the season continued on March 17, 2008, it was moved back to 8:30pm. The complete third season was released on Region 1 DVD on October 7, 2008. In the United Kingdom it aired via E4 from October 30, 2009 weekdays at 7:30pm.

== Cast ==
=== Main cast ===
- Josh Radnor as Ted Mosby
- Jason Segel as Marshall Eriksen
- Cobie Smulders as Robin Scherbatsky
- Neil Patrick Harris as Barney Stinson
- Alyson Hannigan as Lily Aldrin
- Bob Saget (uncredited) as Future Ted Mosby (voice only)

=== Recurring cast ===
- Lyndsy Fonseca as Penny, Ted's Daughter
- David Henrie as Luke, Ted's Son
- Charlene Amoia as Wendy the Waitress
- Sarah Chalke as Stella
- Marshall Manesh as Ranjit
- Bryan Callen as Bilson

=== Guest cast ===
- Britney Spears as Abby
- Enrique Iglesias as Gael
- Maggie Wheeler as Margaret
- April Bowlby as Meg
- John Cho as Jefferson Coatsworth
- Mandy Moore as Amy
- James Van Der Beek as Simon
- Heidi Klum as herself
- Orson Bean as Bob
- Lindsay Price as Cathy
- Kristen Schaal as Laura Girard
- Abigail Spencer as Blah Blah
- Alan Thicke as himself
- Tiffany Darwish as herself
- Doug Benson as Cool Customs Guy
- Danica McKellar as Trudy
- Busy Philipps as Rachel
- Neil Jackson as Ian
- Bob Odenkirk as Arthur Hobbs
- Brad Rowe as George
- Joe Manganiello as Brad
- Janet Varney as Stacey
- Betsy Rue as Audrey
- Ron Butler as Proctor

== Episodes ==
Season three episodes
No. overall	No. in season	Title	Directed by	Written by	Original release date	Prod. code	US viewers (millions)
45	1	"Wait for It"	Pamela Fryman	Carter Bays & Craig Thomas	September 24, 2007	3ALH01	8.12
When Robin arrives home with a hunky Argentinean boyfriend, Ted decides to go out with Barney for a "legen...wait for it...dary!" night to forget about Robin moving on. Guest starring: Enrique Iglesias as "Gael" and Mandy Moore as "Amy".
46	2	"We're Not from Here"	Pamela Fryman	Chris Harris	October 1, 2007	3ALH02	7.87
After seeing girls swoon for Robin's boyfriend, Gael, because of his foreign charm, Barney and Ted try to pull themselves off as out-of-towners in order to meet girls. Marshall and Lily write letters which are to be read after their death, while Robin begins to lose her relaxed self she had when she was in Argentina for a vacation.
47	3	"Third Wheel"	Pamela Fryman	David Hemingson	October 8, 2007	3ALH04	7.96
Two women become very interested in Ted and end up taking the party to his place. The gang must show Ted that bad luck doesn't come in threes. Guest starring: Danica McKellar as "Trudy"
48	4	"Little Boys"	Rob Greenberg	Kourtney Kang	October 15, 2007	3ALH03	7.71
Robin dates a single dad, and to her surprise, bonds with the man's son, which causes her to worry that the relationship is too serious. Meanwhile Ted and Barney compete to see who has more 'game'.
49	5	"How I Met Everyone Else"	Pamela Fryman	Gloria Calderon Kellett	October 22, 2007	3ALH05	8.50
Ted's new girlfriend becomes jealous that the story about how Ted and his friends met is better than how she met him, resulting in her ranking on Barney's "crazy scale" to go through the roof.
50	6	"I'm Not That Guy"	Pamela Fryman	Jonathan Groff	October 29, 2007	3ALH07	7.82
When a law firm tries to recruit Marshall, executive Jefferson Coatsworth (John Cho) is able to win him over, forcing Marshall to stray from his dream to save the Earth. Meanwhile, the gang finds out that a porn star is named after one of them.
51	7	"Dowisetrepla"	Pamela Fryman	Brenda Hsueh	November 5, 2007	3ALH06	8.77
Lily and Marshall make a rash of irresponsible decisions when buying an apartment in the "Dowisetrepla" neighbourhood, while Barney uses this opportunity to hook up with women without giving away his address. Marshall learns about Lily's secret.
52	8	"Spoiler Alert"	Pamela Fryman	Stephen Lloyd	November 12, 2007	3ALH08	8.42
An annoying habit in Ted's new girlfriend causes the gang to point out their own bad habits which are unnoticed by the group. Marshall turns to Barney for help after forgetting his password to check his bar exam results.
53	9	"Slapsgiving"	Pamela Fryman	Matt Kuhn	November 19, 2007	3ALH09	8.07
Lily and Marshall have their first Thanksgiving as a married couple; Barney is tortured by the slap bet countdown clock, worrying about when the slap will be dished out.
54	10	"The Yips"	Pamela Fryman	Jamie Rhonheimer	November 26, 2007	3ALH10	7.91
After the gang joins a gym, Barney sees Rhonda (the woman who took his virginity) there. After learning that his performance with her was poor, he loses his ability to approach women. Barney loses his 'mojo' and heads to the Victoria's Secret Fall Fashion Show party to try to get it back, but he's put to the test when he meets Heidi Klum.
55	11	"The Platinum Rule"	Pamela Fryman	Carter Bays & Craig Thomas	December 10, 2007	3ALH11	8.30
Ted's friends try to discourage him from going on a date with his tattoo-removal doctor, a person he sees regularly, by telling their own bad experiences.
56	12	"No Tomorrow"	Pamela Fryman	Carter Bays & Craig Thomas	March 17, 2008	3ALH12	9.61
Ted decides to take on Barney's lifestyle for St. Patrick's Day, which would likely include activities which are very un-saintly. Robin and Marshall don't know how to tell Lily that something is wrong with their new apartment.
57	13	"Ten Sessions"	Pamela Fryman	Chris Harris and Carter Bays & Craig Thomas	March 24, 2008	3ALH14	10.67
While Ted is repeatedly rejected for a date by his dermatologist, Stella (Sarah Chalke), her receptionist, Abby (Britney Spears), becomes interested in him.
58	14	"The Bracket"	Pamela Fryman	Joe Kelly	March 31, 2008	3ALH13	9.50
A mysterious woman is sabotaging Barney's attempts to hook up with other women, forcing him to use a tournament bracket to narrow down a group of 64 women who have a reason to hate him.
59	15	"The Chain of Screaming"	Pamela Fryman	Carter Bays & Craig Thomas	April 14, 2008	3ALH15	8.08
Marshall cries in front of his boss after he screams at him, and everybody gives Marshall their own unique advice on how to confront his boss about the situation.
60	16	"Sandcastles in the Sand"	Pamela Fryman	Kourtney Kang	April 21, 2008	3ALH16	8.45
Robin rekindles a spark with Simon, an old flame (James Van Der Beek), but he ends up breaking her heart again. Barney and his own inimitable style helps make her feel better. Guests appearances Tiffany and Alan Thicke.
61	17	"The Goat"	Pamela Fryman	Stephen Lloyd	April 28, 2008	3ALH17	8.84
After sleeping with Robin, Barney feels guilty and hires Marshall to search for a loophole in the Bro Code so Barney can maintain his friendship with Ted. Meanwhile, Lily decides to rescue a goat while the gang plans Ted's surprise party.
62	18	"Rebound Bro"	Pamela Fryman	Jamie Rhonheimer	May 5, 2008	3ALH18	8.36
Stella is finally ready to get intimate with Ted. Meanwhile, since his split with Ted, Barney searches for a replacement Bro, finally settling reluctantly on his hapless co-worker Randy (Will Forte).
63	19	"Everything Must Go"	Pamela Fryman	Jonathan Groff & Chris Harris	May 12, 2008	3ALH19	8.93
Lily attempts to sell her paintings to pay to fix the slanted floor in the apartment. Barney finally confronts his mysterious saboteur and uses this opportunity to strike a blow to Ted.
64	20	"Miracles"	Pamela Fryman	Carter Bays & Craig Thomas	May 19, 2008	3ALH20	7.99
Ted re-evaluates his life and his relationship with Stella after a close call with death from an accident. Marshall and Robin debate about the existence of miracles.

== Reception ==
The third season of How I Met Your Mother was met with mostly positive reviews. Michelle Zoromski of IGN gave the season a positive review and said that "the season was fun and clever, a good, consistent flow from the first two seasons".
