= Carter Bays =

American television producer, writer, showrunner, and musician

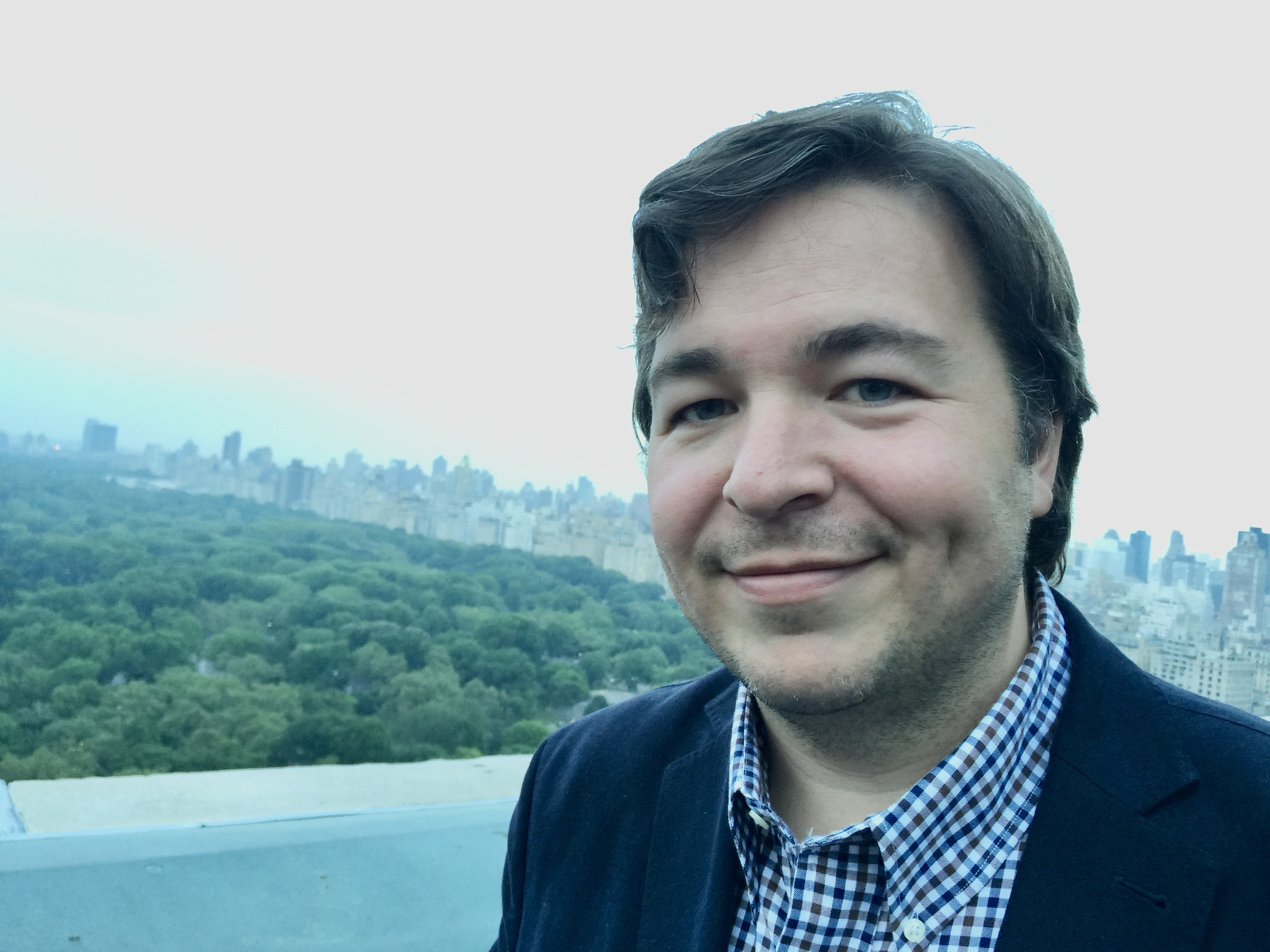
- Born: Carter Loard Bays; August 12, 1975 (age 51); Shaker Heights, Ohio, U.S.
- Education: Wesleyan University
- Occupations: Television producer, showrunner, writer, musician
- Years active: 1998–present
- Spouse: Denise Cox Bays
- Children: 3
- Website: carterbays.com

Carter Loard Bays (born August 12, 1975) is an American author, playwright, television writer, and musician. He co-created the CBS sitcom How I Met Your Mother, and served as showrunner, writer and executive producer for all nine seasons. His novel, The Mutual Friend, was released in 2022 by Dutton Books. His play, True Marriage, is scheduled for production at the McCarter Theatre in the spring of 2027.

== Early life ==
Bays was born in Cleveland, Ohio. He grew up in Shaker Heights, Ohio, and attended Shaker Heights High School. While in high school, his play Five Visits From Mr. Whitcomb was selected by Young Playwrights Inc. (founded by Stephen Sondheim) as a finalist in its 1993 Young Playwrights Festival. It was produced at Playwrights Horizons in New York City in the fall of 1993.

Bays studied English at Wesleyan University, where he met How I Met Your Mother co-creator Craig Thomas. While at Wesleyan, Bays and Thomas co-founded the band The Solids, best known for the How I Met Your Mother theme song, "Hey Beautiful". In the summer of 1996, Bays and Thomas worked as interns in the Development department of MTV.

== Career ==
=== 1997-2005 ===
In 1997, Bays began writing for Late Show with David Letterman. His work received five Emmy nominations. After leaving the show in 2002, Bays wrote for Oliver Beene, Method & Red, Quintuplets, and American Dad!.

=== 2005-2014 ===
In 2005, Bays and Craig Thomas created the series How I Met Your Mother, and served as its sole showrunners for its entire nine season run. During that time they also created the series The Goodwin Games with fellow How I Met Your Mother writer Chris Harris.

=== 2014-Present ===
Carter's debut novel, The Mutual Friend, was published June 7, 2022, through Dutton Books.

Since 2024 he has been an Assistant Adjunct Professor at Columbia University School of the Arts, where he teaches television writing in the masters film program. He is also an Associate Fellow at Davenport College at Yale University. For three years he served on the board of the Armed Services Arts Partnership, which helps veterans return to civilian life through comedy and the arts.

== Personal life ==
Bays lives in New York City with his wife, Denise Cox Bays, and their three children.

== Works ==
=== How I Met Your Mother ===
- "Pilot"
- "Purple Giraffe"
- "The Pineapple Incident"
- "Life Among the Gorillas"
- "Nothing Good Happens After 2 A.M."
- "Milk"
- "Come On"
- "Where Were We?"
- "Monday Night Football"
- "Bachelor Party"
- "Something Blue"
- "Wait for It"
- "The Platinum Rule"
- "No Tomorrow"
- "Ten Sessions"
- "The Chain of Screaming"
- "Miracles"
- "Do I Know You?"
- "The Best Burger in New York"
- "Woooo!"
- "The Stinsons"
- "As Fast as She Can"
- "The Leap"
- "Definitions"
- "Robin 101"
- "The Playbook"
- "Girls Versus Suits"
- "Rabbit or Duck"
- "Doppelgangers"
- "Big Days"
- "Architect of Destruction"
- "Natural History"
- "Last Words"
- "Oh Honey"
- "Landmarks"
- "Challenge Accepted"
- "The Best Man"
- "Ducky Tie"
- "The Rebound Girl"
- "Tailgate"
- "The Burning Beekeeper"
- "The Broath"
- "Good Crazy"
- "The Magician's Code"
- "Farhampton"
- "The Pre-Nup"
- "The Final Page"
- "Band or DJ?"
- "P.S. I Love You"
- "Bad Crazy"
- "The Ashtray"
- "The Time Travelers"
- "Something Old"
- "Something New"
- "The Locket"
- "Coming Back"
- "Mom And Dad"
- "Bedtime Stories"
- "Bass Player Wanted"
- "Slapsgiving 3: Slappointment in Slapmarra"
- "How Your Mother Met Me"
- "Sunrise"
- "Rally"
- "Daisy"
- "The End of the Aisle"
- "Last Forever"

=== Oliver Beene ===
- "Dancing Beene"
- "The Nudie Mag"
- "X-Ray Specs"
- "A Trip to Coney Island"
- "Oliver and the Otters"

=== The Goodwin Games ===
- "Pilot"
- "Hamletta"

=== American Dad! ===
- "Stan of Arabia: Part 2"
