= Craig Thomas (screenwriter) =

American television writer and producer

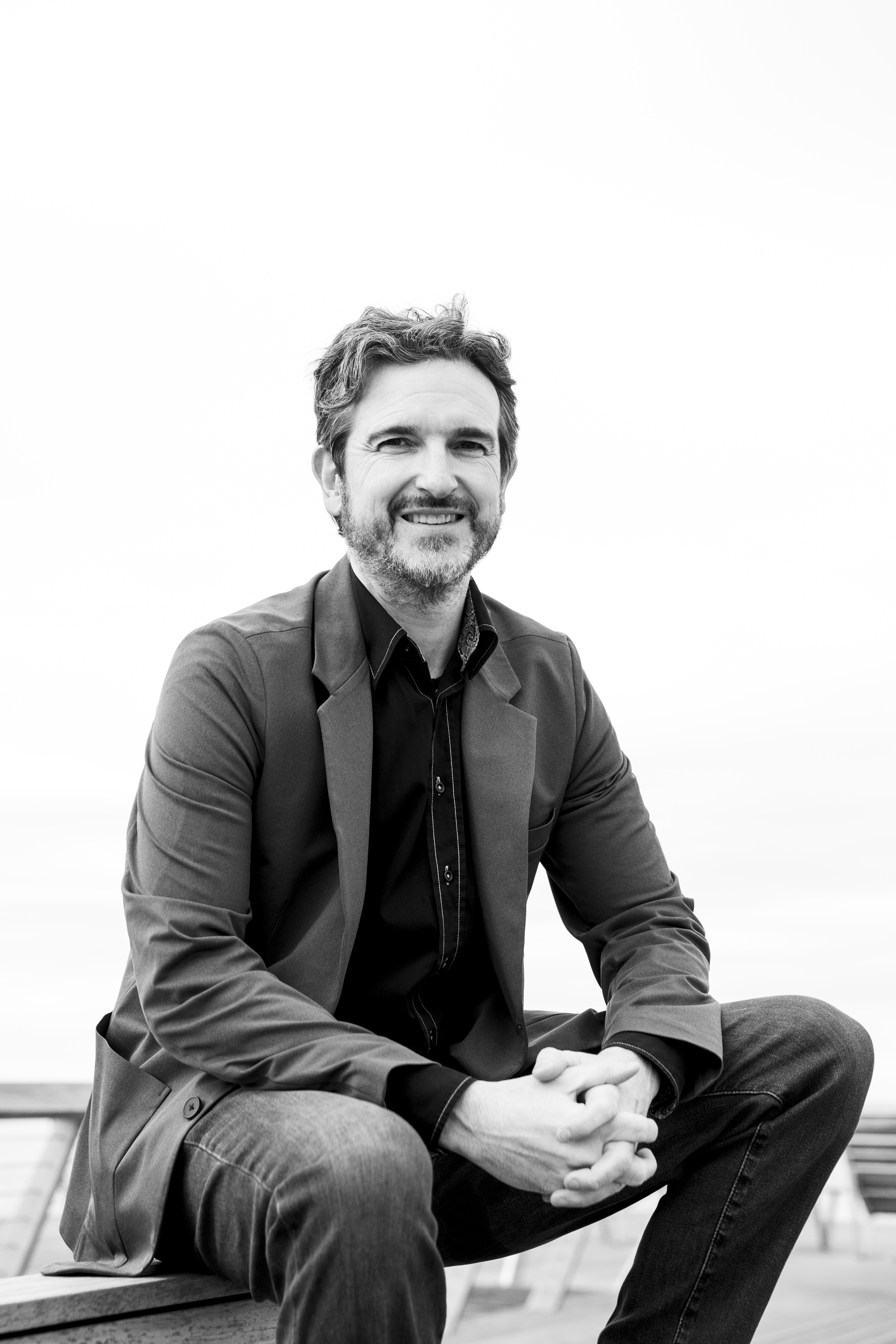
- Craig Thomas in 2025
- Born: Craig David Thomas
- Education: Wesleyan University
- Occupations: Television writer, producer, musician
- Years active: 1998–present
- Notable work: How I Met Your Mother
- Website: https://www.craigthomaswriter.com/

Craig David Thomas is an American television writer who, along with writing partner Carter Bays, has written episodes of American Dad!, Oliver Beene, Quintuplets and the hit CBS sitcom How I Met Your Mother, which they created in 2005. In 2012, How I Met Your Mother won a People's Choice Awards.

Along with Carter Bays he is a member of The Solids, who perform the theme song to How I Met Your Mother. He has been nominated for seven primetime Emmy Awards, including Best Original Song for "Nothing Suits Me Like a Suit".

After graduating from Wesleyan University in 1997, Thomas wrote for the Late Show with David Letterman for 5 years.

In 2014, he shot a pilot for the show How I Met Your Dad with his partner Carter Bays, Emily Spivey and Greta Gerwig, but CBS asked them to do a second pilot, and they refused.

On April 15, 2019, Thomas joined a host of other writers in firing their agents as part of the WGA's stand against the ATA and the practice of packaging.

In November of 2025, Thomas's debut novel, That's Not How It Happened was published by HarperCollins. The book was inspired by Thomas's experience raising his young adult son with Jacobsen Syndrome.

In addition to his writing, Thomas has fundraised extensively for Dr. Paul Grossfeld's lab at the Rady Children's Hospital of San Diego. Grossfeld's lab conducts research into the genetic causes of congenital heart disease, particularly Jacobsen syndrome, a rare genetic disorder caused by the loss of a part of the 11th human chromosome.

== Works ==
=== How I Met Your Mother ===
- "Pilot"
- "Purple Giraffe"
- "The Pineapple Incident"
- "Life Among the Gorillas"
- "Nothing Good Happens After 2 A.M."
- "Milk"
- "Come On"
- "Where Were We?"
- "Monday Night Football"
- "Bachelor Party"
- "Something Blue"
- "Wait for It"
- "The Platinum Rule"
- "No Tomorrow"
- "Ten Sessions"
- "The Chain of Screaming"
- "Miracles"
- "Do I Know You?"
- "The Best Burger in New York"
- "Woooo!"
- "The Stinsons"
- "As Fast as She Can"
- "The Leap"
- "Definitions"
- "Robin 101"
- "The Playbook"
- "Girls Versus Suits"
- "Rabbit or Duck"
- "Doppelgangers"
- "Big Days"
- "Architect of Destruction"
- "Natural History"
- "Last Words"
- "Oh Honey"
- "Landmarks"
- "Challenge Accepted"
- "The Best Man"
- "Ducky Tie"
- "The Rebound Girl"
- "Tailgate"
- "The Burning Beekeeper"
- "The Broath"
- "Good Crazy"
- "The Magician's Code"
- "Farhampton"
- "The Pre-Nup"
- "The Final Page"
- "Band or DJ?"
- "P.S. I Love You"
- "Bad Crazy"
- "The Ashtray"
- "The Time Travelers"
- "Something Old"
- "Something New"
- "The Locket"
- "Coming Back"
- "Mom And Dad"
- "Bedtime Stories"
- "Bass Player Wanted"
- "Slapsgiving 3: Slappointment in Slapmarra"
- "How Your Mother Met Me"
- "Sunrise"
- "Rally"
- "Daisy"
- "The End of the Aisle"
- "Last Forever"

=== Oliver Beene ===
- "Dancing Beene"
- "The Nudie Mag"
- "X-Ray Specs"
- "A Trip To Connie Island"
- "Oliver and The Otters"

=== The Goodwin Games ===
- "Pilot"
- "The Hamletta"

=== American Dad! ===
- "Stan of Arabia: Part 2"

He did audio commentary for his episode of American Dad! and has been prominent in the How I Met Your Mother DVD audio commentaries.

== Songwriting ==
=== The Solids ===
- "Soap On Your Skin"
- "You Don't Know What You've Begun"
- "Dishwasher"
- "Guns"
- "Clowns Like Candy"
- "Across The Overpass"
- "My Best Year"
- "Hey Good News"
- "Second Coat"
- "Noisemaker"
- "Page for the Kid"
- "February Graffiti"
- "Webb Pierce Song"
- "Widow to a Haircut"
- "The Wrong Man"
- "If Anything"
- "The Future is Now"

=== How I Met Your Mother ===
- "Nothing Suits Me Like A Suit" (Emmy Nomination)
- "You Just Got Slapped"
- "Let's Go to the Mall"
- "Hey Beautiful"
- "Sandcastles in the Sand"
- "PS I Love You"
- "Barney Stinson, That Guy's Awesome"
- "Ted Mosby is a Jerk"
- "Best Night Ever"
- "Superdate"
- "Shame on You"
- "Food Delivery / Cat Sitting / Cat Funeral"
- "Ode to Virginia"
- "Murder Train"
- "The Bro Chant"
- "Mosbius Designs Have Failed"
- "Marshall vs the Machines"
- "Hey Beautiful (Barney Version)"
- "Two Beavers are Better Than One"
- "Puzzles Theme Song"
- "Bang Bang Bangity Bang"
- "Night Night Little Marvin"
- "On the House"
- Asking Out Lily Pts 1 & 2"
- "Soul Bang"
- "And There She was" (Featuring John Swihart)
- "Barney Makes 3 Its 1 & 2"

=== Sesame Street ===
- Look for the Slime (Season 46, Episode 2)
- The Vet Song (Season 49, Episode 1)
- Packing PJ's (Season 50, Episode 1)
- I Wonder (Season 51, Episode 23)
- How Do You Build a Robot Dog? (Season 52, Episode 1)

== The Solids ==
In 1996, Thomas and Carter Bays (with whom he would later create How I Met Your Mother) formed the power pop band The Solids with fellow Wesleyan University students Patrick Butler and Nick Coleman. The band went on to write the theme songs for two television shows: Oliver Beene and How I Met Your Mother.

== Other Writing ==
In addition to writing for television, Thomas published the novel That's Not How It Happened in November 2025. His prose has also been featured in the New Yorker's Shouts & Murmurs column five times (Bad Reviews of Beloved Classics, RE: The Asteroid, Studio Notes on Your Rom-Com Screenplay, One Writer's Year in Pandemic Think Pieces, A Look Back at March 12, 2020), McSweeney's, the Boston Globe, and the Iowa Review.
