= Pamela Fryman =

American television producer and director (born 1959)

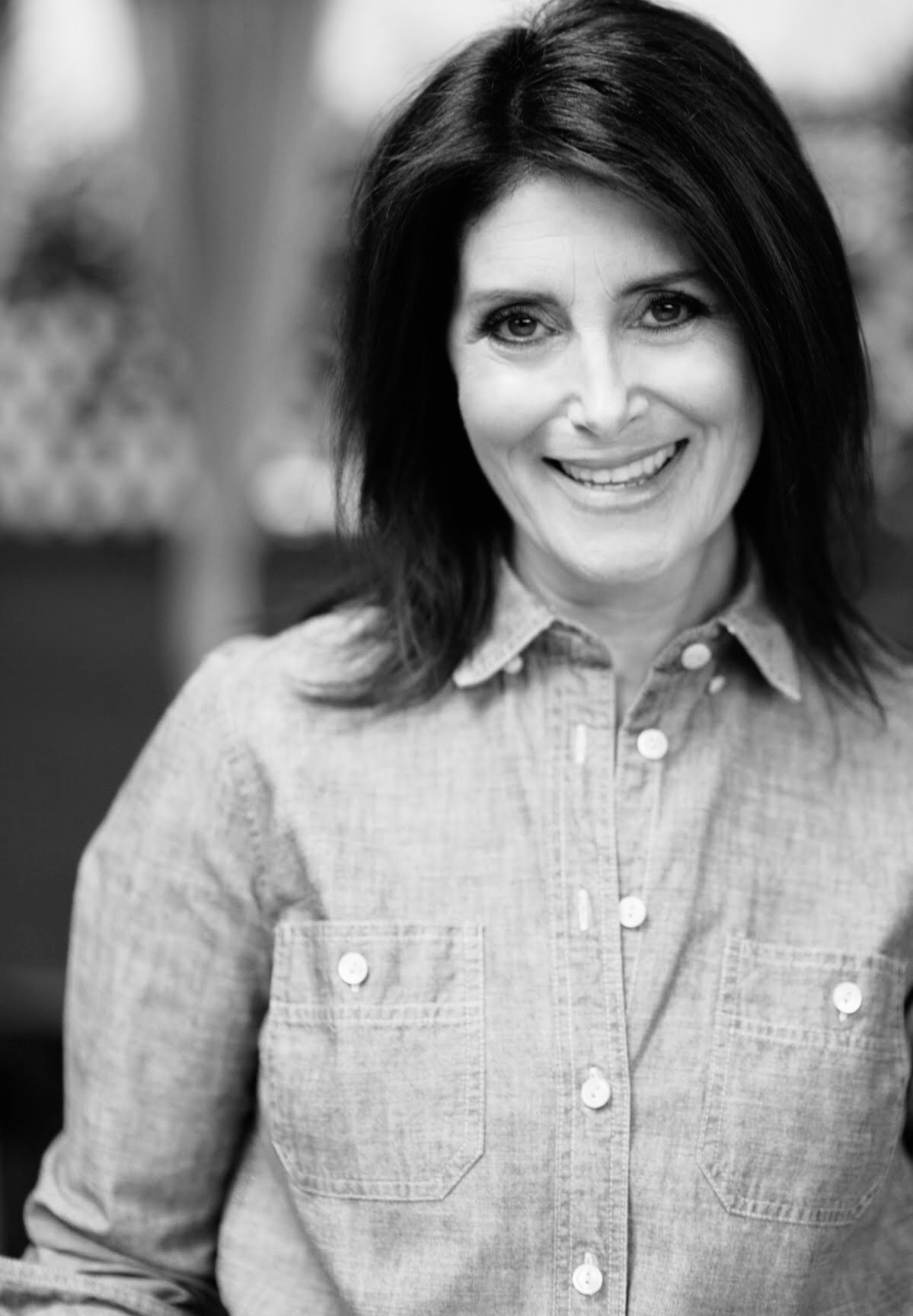
- Born: Pamela Gail Fryman; August 19, 1959 (age 67); Philadelphia, Pennsylvania, U.S.
- Occupations: Television director and producer
- Years active: 1988–present

Pamela Gail Fryman (born August 19, 1959) is an American sitcom director and producer. She was the principal director of the television series How I Met Your Mother, directing 196 of the show's 208 episodes.

== Biography ==
Born and raised in Philadelphia, Pennsylvania, Fryman got her first job on The John Davidson Show as an assistant to the talent coordinator, and went on to be a booth production assistant and secretary on Santa Barbara, eventually moving up to assistant director (AD), and director. In 1993, producer Peter Noah, with whom she had worked on the game show Dream House, gave Fryman a chance to direct an episode of the short-lived sitcom Café Americain.

Fryman, who had done stage directing earlier in her career, was hired for that reason by Frasier creator and executive producer David Lee due to that show's rehearsal resembling play staging. Fryman directed 34 episodes of the show from seasons four through eight.

She also became main director on Just Shoot Me!, directing 94 out of the 148 episodes the show aired.

Fryman directed the majority of the episodes of How I Met Your Mother. Show creator Craig Thomas praised her communication skills, saying, "She makes everyone feel they've been heard and respected and she can connect with anyone." Though Fryman's original career plan did not include directing (she figured she would "follow in her father's footsteps in merchandising"), she has grown to realize that directing is her forte and passion. In Variety magazine, Fryman said that continuing to direct How I Met Your Mother is her fantasy realized. In 2014, she officiated the wedding of How I Met Your Mother star Neil Patrick Harris and David Burtka, who played a side role in the show.

She also directed 19 out of the 30 episodes of How I Met Your Father.

She achieved the milestone of directing her 500th episode of television in 2016 with the third episode of the third season of The Odd Couple.

== Awards ==
Fryman has received recognition from the Academy of Television Arts & Sciences also known as the (ATAS), the National Academy of Television Arts and Sciences, the Directors Guild of America, Goldderby.com, the Online Film & Television Association also known as the (OFTA), and the Women in Film organization.

- 1990 Won - Daytime Emmy Award for Outstanding Drama Series Directing Team (Santa Barbara)
- 1991 Won - Daytime Emmy Award for Outstanding Drama Series Directing Team (Santa Barbara)
- 1998 Nominated - Directors Guild Award for Outstanding Directorial Achievement in Comedy Series ("Halloween (Part 1)") (Frasier)
- 1999 Nominated - Directors Guild Award for Outstanding Directorial Achievement in Comedy Series ("Two Girls for Every Boy") (Just Shoot Me!)
- 2000 Nominated - Directors Guild Award for Outstanding Directorial Achievement in Comedy Series ("The Flight Before Christmas") (Frasier)
- 2001 Nominated - Directors Guild Award for Outstanding Directorial Achievement in Comedy Series ("And The Dish Ran Away With The Spoon (Part 1 & 2)") (Frasier)
- 2009 Nominated - Primetime Emmy Award for Outstanding Comedy Series (How I Met Your Mother)
- 2011 Nominated - Online Film & Television Association Award for Best Direction in a Comedy Series (How I Met Your Mother)
- 2011 Nominated - Primetime Emmy Award for Outstanding Directing for a Comedy Series ("Subway Wars") (How I Met Your Mother)
- 2011 Won - Women in Film Crystal + Lucy Award, Dorothy Arzner Directors Award
- 2020 Nominated - Primetime Emmy Award for Outstanding Directing for a Variety Special (Live in Front of a Studio Audience: "All in the Family" and "Good Times") (shared with Andy Fisher)

== Filmography ==
=== Film ===
Year	Title	Credited as		Notes
Year	Title	Director	Producer	Notes
2001	The Gene Pool	Yes	No	Television Movie
2001	Count Me In	Yes	No	Television Movie
2003	The Snobs	Yes	No	Television Movie
2006	You've Reached the Elliotts	Yes	No	Television Movie
2006	Sex, Power, Love & Politics	Yes	No	Television Movie
2006	Inseparable	Yes	No	Television Movie
2007	The Minister of Divine	Yes	No	Television Movie
2009	The Karenskys	Yes	No	Television Movie
2009	CBS Fall Preview	Yes	No	Television special
2010	True Love	Yes	No	Television Movie
2010	Livin' on a Prayer	Yes	No	Television Movie
2010	Freshman	Yes	No	Television Movie
2011	The Assistants	Yes	No	Television Movie
2011	And They're Off	No	Yes	Feature Film; Producer
2012	Table for Three	Yes	No	Television Movie
2013	Divorce: A Love Story	Yes	No	Television Movie
2014	Save the Date	Yes	No	Television Movie
2014	Cuz-Bros	Yes	No	Television Movie
2014	Cabot College	Yes	Yes	Television Movie; also Executive Producer
2014	How I Met Your Dad	No	Yes	Television Movie; also Executive Producer
2015	The Perfect Stanleys	Yes	No	Television Movie
2015	The History of Us	Yes	No	Television Movie
2016	My Time Your Time	Yes	Yes	Television Movie; also Executive Producer
2016	Good Fortune	Yes	No	Television Movie
2017	Distefano	Yes	Yes	Television Movie; also Executive Producer
2017	Real Life	Yes	Yes	Television Movie; also Executive Producer
2018	Most Likely To	Yes	No	Television Movie
2018	History of Them	Yes	Yes	Television Movie; also Executive Producer
2018	Making Friends	Yes	Yes	Television Movie; also Executive Producer

=== Television ===
Year	Title	Credited as		Notes
Year	Title	Director	Producer	Notes
1990–1993	Santa Barbara	Yes	No	21 episodes (director); 177 episodes (also associate director); Episode: "#1.916" (actor)
1994	Cafe Americain	Yes	No	Episode: "Oh, Brother"
1994	Muddling Through	Yes	No	3 episodes
1994–1997	Friends	Yes	No	2 episodes
1995	The Boys Are Back	Yes	No	Episode: "Bad Hair Day"
1995	Bringing Up Jack	Yes	No	Episode: "Close Personal Friends"
1995	The Single Guy	Yes	No	unknown episode
1995	Dweebs	Yes	No	9 episodes
1995–1996	Bless This House	Yes	No	3 episodes
1996	Ned and Stacey	Yes	No	Episode: "Friends and Lovers"
1996	Good Company	Yes	No	2 episodes
1996	Caroline in the City	Yes	No	Episode: "Caroline and the Cereal"
1996	Hope & Gloria	Yes	No	2 episodes
1996	Pearl	Yes	No	Episode: "The Two Mrs. Rizzos"
1996	Townies	Yes	No	7 episodes
1996–1997	The Naked Truth	Yes	No	3 episodes
1996–1997	Cybill	Yes	No	4 episodes
1997	Fired Up	Yes	No	2 episodes
1997	Suddenly Susan	Yes	No	5 episodes
1997–1998	George and Leo	Yes	No	4 episodes
1997–2001	Frasier	Yes	No	34 episodes
1998	The Simple Life	Yes	No	Episode: "Pilot"
1998	Maggie Winters	Yes	No	Episode: "Pilot
1998	Encore! Encore!	Yes	No	Episode: "I Am Joe's Ego"
1998	The King of Queens	Yes	No	3 episodes
1998–2003	Just Shoot Me!	Yes	Yes	95 episodes (director); 46 episodes (also Executive Producer)
1999	Norm	Yes	No	Episode: "Drive, Norm Said" also known as "The Norm Show"
1999	Work with Me	Yes	No	Episode: "Pilot"
1999	Love & Money	Yes	No	Episode: "Pilot"
2000	Welcome to New York	Yes	No	unknown episode
2001	Three Sisters	Yes	No	3 episodes
2001	Inside Schwartz	Yes	No	2 episodes
2002	In-Laws	Yes	No	2 episodes
2003	My Big Fat Greek Life	Yes	No	Episode: "The House Gift"
2003–2004	Happy Family	Yes	Yes	22 episodes (director); 21 episodes (also Executive Producer)
2004–2005	Two and a Half Men	Yes	No	20 episodes
2005–2014	How I Met Your Mother	Yes	Yes	208 episodes (Executive Producer); 196 episodes (also director);
2006	Courting Alex	Yes	No	Episode: "A Tale of Two Kisses"
2009	Accidentally on Purpose	Yes	No	2 episodes
2011	Mad Love	Yes	No	Episode: "Fireworks"
2011	How to Be a Gentleman	Yes	No	2 episodes
2012	Friend Me	Yes	No	unknown episode
2013	Mom	Yes	No	Episode: "Pilot"
2014–2015	The McCarthys	Yes	Yes	11 episodes (director); 11 episodes (also Executive Producer)
2015	Truth Be Told	Yes	Yes	7 episodes (director); 7 episodes (also Executive Producer)
2016–2017	The Odd Couple	Yes	No	3 episodes
2016–2018	Man with a Plan	Yes	No	12 episodes
2017–2018	9JKL	Yes	Yes	8 episodes (director); 8 episodes (also Executive Producer)
2017–2020	One Day at a Time	Yes	Yes	11 episodes (director); Episode: "This Is It" (Executive Producer)
2018	Murphy Brown	Yes	Yes	Episode: "Pilot" (director); Episode: "Pilot" (also Executive Producer)
2019	Abby's	Yes	Yes	5 episodes (director); also Executive Producer
2019–2020	Carol's Second Act	Yes	No	8 episodes (director)
2019	Merry Happy Whatever	Yes	Yes	4 episodes (director); also Executive Producer
2019	Live in Front of a Studio Audience: "All in the Family" and "Good Times"	Yes	No	Television special (director)
2021	Call Your Mother	Yes	Yes	10 episodes (director); also, Executive Producer
2021	Pretty Smart	Yes	Yes	3 episodes (director); also, executive producer
2022–2023	How I Met Your Father	Yes	Yes	19 episodes (director); also, executive producer
2023–2024	Night Court	Yes	Yes	6 episodes (director); also executive producer
2024–2026	Happy's Place	Yes	Yes	16 episodes (director); also executive producer
2026	Newlyweds	Yes	Yes	Director; Also executive producer
