= List of How I Met Your Mother characters =

From left to right: Ted, Robin, Barney, Marshall, Lily.

The US sitcom How I Met Your Mother premiered on CBS on September 19, 2005. Created by Craig Thomas and Carter Bays, the show is presented from the perspective of Ted Mosby in 2030 ("Future Ted") as he tells his children how he met the titular mother. The show lasted for nine seasons and 208 episodes; the finale first aired on March 31, 2014. A stand-alone sequel series, How I Met Your Father, premiered on Hulu on January 18, 2022. Created by Isaac Aptaker and Elizabeth Berger, the show is presented from the perspective of Sophie in 2050 as she recounts to her unseen son the events that followed meeting his father in January 2022.

The main characters of How I Met Your Mother are: Ted Mosby, a romantic searching for "The One"; Barney Stinson, a womanizer; Robin Scherbatsky, a journalist who moved to New York in 2005; and Marshall Eriksen and Lily Aldrin, a long-term couple. Although the show is based around The Mother, her first appearance is not until the season eight finale. How I Met Your Father meanwhile features the main characters Sophie, a romantic searching for her "soulmate"; Jesse, an aspiring musician; Sid, Jesse's best friend; Valentina and Charlie, Sophie's best friend and her British boyfriend; and Ellen, Jesse's adoptive sister, while also featuring main characters from How I Met Your Mother in guest roles.

Many of the main characters' relatives appear throughout the show, such as Lily's father or Barney's brother. They may also be seen in family gatherings, such as Barney and Robin's wedding or Marshall's father's funeral. Ted's children and Marvin W. Eriksen (son of Marshall and Lily) appear in the background of many episodes and key moments without being crucial to many plots.

Ranjit, Carl, and several other characters often appear because they work in places the main cast frequently visit/hang out at (such as MacLaren's Pub). Characters in relationships with Ted, Barney, or Robin often appear in several episodes within a short period of time, such as Victoria, Nora, or Kevin. Minor characters such as the Slutty Pumpkin or Mary the Paralegal may only appear in one or two episodes, but still play a crucial role in the episodes in which they appear.

== Cast table ==
Character	Portrayed by	How I Met Your Mother									How I Met Your Father	
Character	Portrayed by	1	2	3	4	5	6	7	8	9	1	2
Main Characters
Ted Mosby	Josh Radnor	Main	Main	Main	Main	Main	Main	Main	Main	Main		
Future Ted Mosby	Bob Saget (voice only) ^{2}	Main	Main	Main	Main	Main	Main	Main	Main	Main		
Marshall Eriksen	Jason Segel	Main	Main	Main	Main	Main	Main	Main	Main	Main		
Robin Scherbatsky	Cobie Smulders	Main	Main	Main	Main	Main	Main	Main	Main	Main	Guest	
Barney Stinson	Neil Patrick Harris	Main	Main	Main	Main	Main	Main	Main	Main	Main		Guest
Lily Aldrin	Alyson Hannigan	Main	Main	Main	Main	Main	Main	Main	Main	Main		
The Doppelgängers	Various^{1}					Main	Main	Main		Main		
Tracy McConnell	Cristin Milioti^{3}								Guest	Main		
Sophie Tompkins	Hilary Duff										Main	Main
Future Sophie Tompkins	Kim Cattrall (voice only)										Main	Main
Jesse	Christopher Lowell										Main	Main
Valentina	Francia Raisa										Main	Main
Sid	Suraj Sharma										Main	Main
Charlie	Tom Ainsley										Main	Main
Ellen	Tien Tran										Main	Main
Supporting Characters
Penny Mosby	Lyndsy Fonseca	Recurring	Recurring	Recurring	Recurring	Recurring	Recurring	Recurring	Recurring	Recurring		
Luke Mosby	David Henrie	Recurring	Recurring	Recurring	Recurring	Recurring	Recurring	Recurring	Recurring	Recurring		
Carl MacLaren	Joe Nieves	Recurring	Recurring		Guest	Guest	Guest	Guest	Guest	Recurring	Guest	
Ranjit Singh	Marshall Manesh	Recurring	Guest	Recurring	Guest	Guest	Guest	Guest	Guest	Recurring		
Sandy Rivers	Alexis Denisof	Recurring					Guest	Recurring	Guest	Guest		Guest
Victoria	Ashley Williams	Recurring						Recurring	Recurring	Guest		
Wendy the Waitress	Charlene Amoia	Recurring	Recurring	Recurring	Recurring	Recurring	Recurring					
Marcus Eriksen	Ned Rolsma	Guest	Guest		Guest	Guest	Guest	Guest	Recurring			
Bilson	Bryan Callen	Guest		Guest	Recurring							
Marvin Eriksen	Bill Fagerbakke	Guest			Guest	Guest	Recurring	Guest	Guest	Guest		
Judy Eriksen	Suzie Plakson	Guest				Guest	Recurring	Guest	Recurring	Guest		
Trudy	Danica McKellar	Guest		Guest								
Scooter	David Burtka	Guest	Guest		Guest	Guest	Guest		Guest	Guest		
Stuart Bowers	Matt Boren	Guest	Guest		Guest		Guest		Guest	Guest		
Gary Blauman	Taran Killam	Guest		Guest	Guest	Guest				Guest		
Claudia Bowers	Virginia Williams	Guest			Guest		Guest			Guest		
Brad Morris	Joe Manganiello		Recurring			Guest			Guest			
James Stinson	Wayne Brady		Guest	Guest			Guest	Guest		Recurring		
Loretta Stinson	Megan Mullally (voice only)		Guest									
Loretta Stinson	Frances Conroy				Guest		Guest	Guest	Guest	Recurring		
Virginia Mosby	Cristine Rose		Recurring			Guest	Guest	Guest		Recurring		
Alfred Mosby	Michael Gross		Recurring				Guest					
Hammond Druthers	Bryan Cranston		Recurring							Guest		
Gael	Enrique Iglesias			Recurring								
Stella Zinman	Sarah Chalke			Recurring	Recurring					Guest		
Abby	Britney Spears			Recurring								
Lucy Zinman	Darcy Rose Byrnes			Guest	Recurring							
Arthur Hobbs	Bob Odenkirk			Guest		Guest	Recurring		Guest			
Alan Thicke	Himself			Guest		Guest	Guest		Guest	Guest		
Meg	April Bowlby			Guest		Guest				Guest		
Punchy	Chris Romano			Guest			Guest	Guest				
Simon Tremblay	James Van Der Beek			Guest					Guest	Guest		
Randy Wharmpess	Will Forte			Guest			Guest					
Tony Grafanello	Jason Jones				Recurring							
Anita	Jennifer Lopez					Guest						
Honey	Katy Perry						Guest					
Karen	Laura Prepon				Guest	Guest						
Robin Scherbatsky Sr.	Eric Braeden				Guest							
Robin Scherbatsky Sr.	Ray Wise						Guest	Guest	Guest	Guest		
Mrs. Matsen	Renée Taylor				Guest		Guest	Guest				
Don Frank	Benjamin Koldyke					Recurring						
Mickey Aldrin	Chris Elliott					Guest	Guest	Recurring	Recurring	Guest		
Tim Gunn	Himself					Guest				Recurring		
Jim Nantz	Himself					Guest				Guest		
Cindy	Rachel Bilson					Guest	Guest		Guest	Guest		
Nora	Nazanin Boniadi						Recurring	Recurring		Guest		
George Van Smoot/The Captain	Kyle MacLachlan						Recurring		Recurring	Guest	Guest	
Becky	Laura Bell Bundy						Recurring		Guest	Guest	Guest	
Zoey Pierson	Jennifer Morrison						Recurring			Guest		
Nick Podarutti	Michael Trucco						Guest		Recurring			
Jerome Whittaker	John Lithgow						Recurring			Recurring		
Sam Gibbs	Ben Vereen						Guest			Guest		
Patrice	Ellen D. Williams							Recurring	Recurring	Recurring		
Quinn Garvey	Becki Newton							Recurring	Recurring			
Kevin Venkataraghavan	Kal Penn							Recurring		Guest		
Garrison Cootes	Martin Short							Recurring				
Dr. Sonya	Vicki Lewis							Recurring				
Marvin W. Eriksen	Uncredited							Guest	Recurring			
Marvin W. Eriksen	Jake Elliott								Guest			
Marvin W. Eriksen	August Maturo								Guest			
Marvin W. Eriksen	Spencer Ralston									Recurring		
Jeanette Peterson	Abby Elliott								Recurring	Guest		
Louis	Lou Ferrigno Jr.								Guest	Recurring		
William Zabka	Himself								Guest	Recurring		
Bernice	Judith Drake									Recurring		
Curtis	Roger Bart									Recurring		
Daphne	Sherri Shepherd									Recurring		
Linus	Robert Belushi									Recurring		
Darren	Andrew Rannells									Recurring		
Genevieve Scherbatsky	Tracey Ullman^{4}		Guest							Recurring		

Notes:

- ^1In a recurring gag, the five main main cast members of How I Met Your Mother also portray their doppelgängers in episodes from the fifth season onward: "Moustache Marshall" (Jason Segel), "Lesbian Robin" (Cobie Smulders), Jasmine "Stripper Lily" (Alyson Hannigan), "Mexican Wrestler Ted" (Josh Radnor), and Doctor John Stangel (Neil Patrick Harris).
- ^2 Bob Saget goes uncredited for his narration.
- ^3"The Mother" was played by various stunt actresses (including Jennifer Birmingham and the show's director, Pamela Fryman) throughout the series until Cristin Milioti assumed the role for the season 8 finale.
- ^4An uncredited actress voices Robin's mother in the season 2 episode “Swarley”. However, the character is not formally introduced until the season 9 episode “Vesuvius”.

== Main characters ==
=== Ted Mosby ===
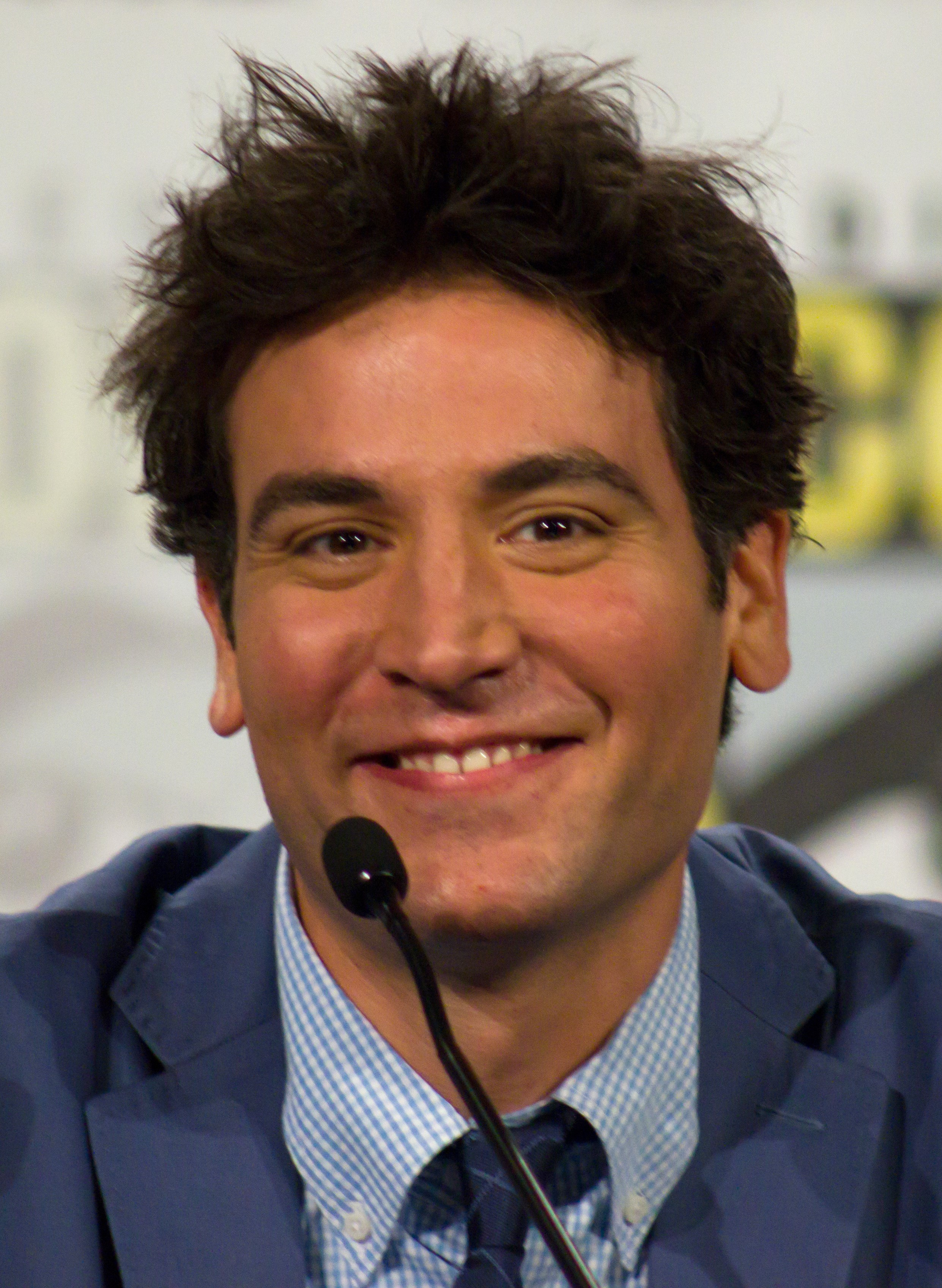
Josh Radnor

Appears in all 208 episodes from "Pilot" to "Last Forever"

Portrayed by Josh Radnor, Theodore Evelyn "Ted" Mosby (born on April 25, 1978) is a romantic, originally searching for "The One" and often discussing destiny and "The Universe" controlling things. Ted grew up in Shaker Heights, Ohio with parents Virginia Mosby, Alfred Mosby, and sister Heather Mosby. He is an architect who graduated from Wesleyan University, where he met Marshall and Lily. Ted is also the show's narrator from the future, voiced by Bob Saget, as he tells his children a very long story, with the premise of explaining how he met their mother. Ted's history includes being left at the altar, taking a job as an architecture professor and designing the new headquarters for Goliath National Bank.

Ted dates many people and has several long-term relationships. Ted has an on-again, off-again relationship with Robin. Ted also dates Victoria, Stella, Zoey and Jeanette. Ted finally meets his wife-to-be, Tracy, on the day of Barney and Robin's wedding, after a series of missed connections over the course of the series: accidentally teaching one of her college classes, owning her yellow umbrella for a short time, and dating her roommate.

In the finale, it is revealed that his wife died six years earlier. His children tell him that his story was about him being in love with Robin as their mother only features in a small amount of it. They urge him to get back together with Robin and he does, bringing the iconic blue French horn with him. A deleted scene confirms they rekindled their relationship.

=== Marshall Eriksen ===
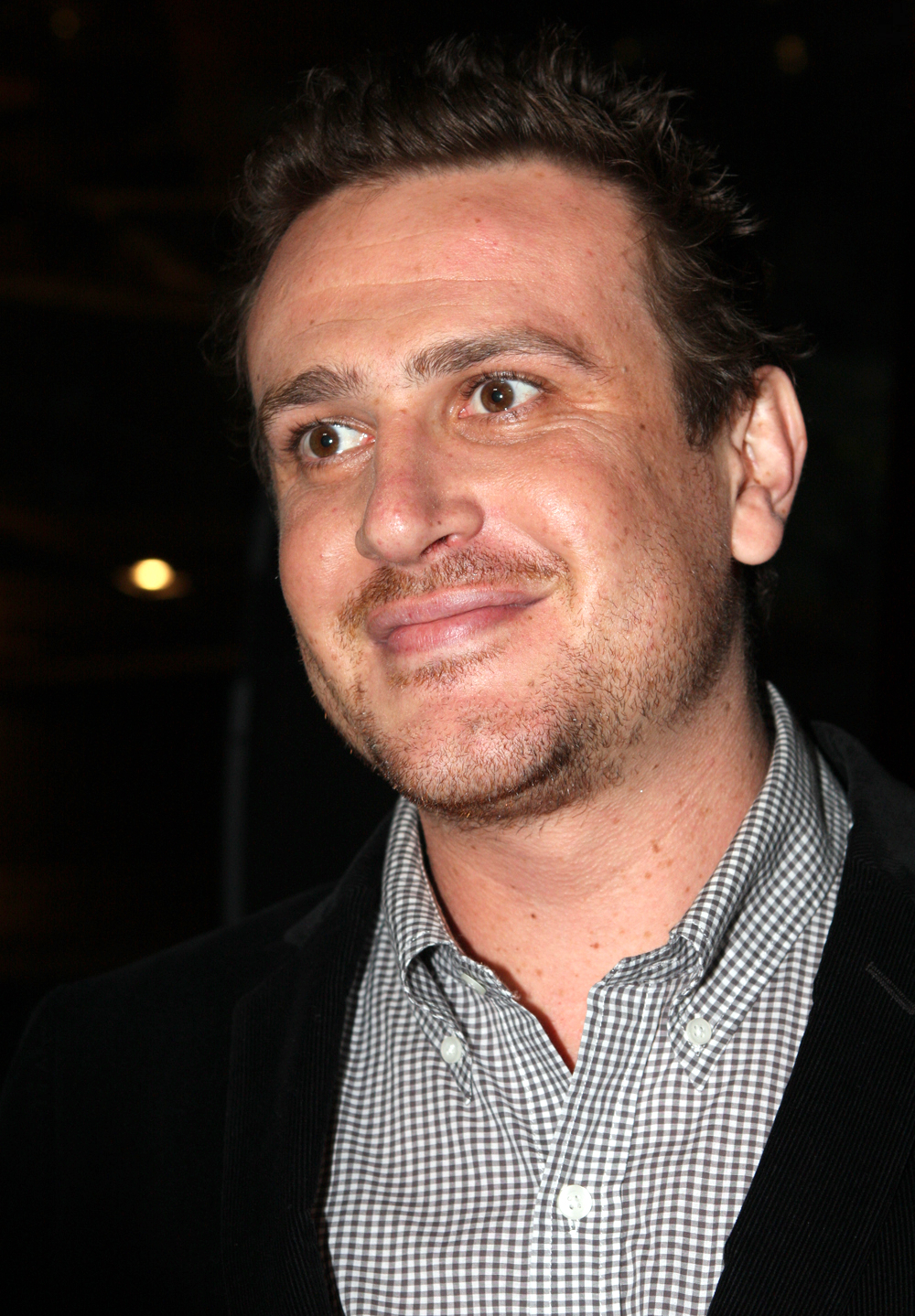
Jason Segel

Appears in all 208 episodes from "Pilot" to "Last Forever"

Portrayed by Jason Segel, Marshall Eriksen met Ted and Lily during their freshman year at Wesleyan University. He and Lily began dating during college and got married at the end of season 2. Marshall is a Columbia Law School graduate originally from Minnesota. Marshall became a lawyer because he was interested in environmental protection laws. He accepts a job at a corporate law firm, before joining the legal team at Goliath National Bank, where Barney also works. Marshall believes in the paranormal, specifically Sasquatch and the Loch Ness Monster. In early 2011, after being told Marshall and Lily are capable of having a baby, Marshall's dad has a fatal heart attack and dies. His first son, born in the episode "The Magician's Code – Part 1" is named Marvin, after Marshall's father.

Marshall eventually is accepted to his dream job, being a judge, after committing to move to Italy with Lily. This leads to constant conflict between the couple through most of the final season. Throughout the first half of the last season, Marshall is on a car ride from Minnesota to Long Island after missing his flight to Barney and Robin's wedding. In this process, Marshall meets The Mother.

=== Robin Scherbatsky ===
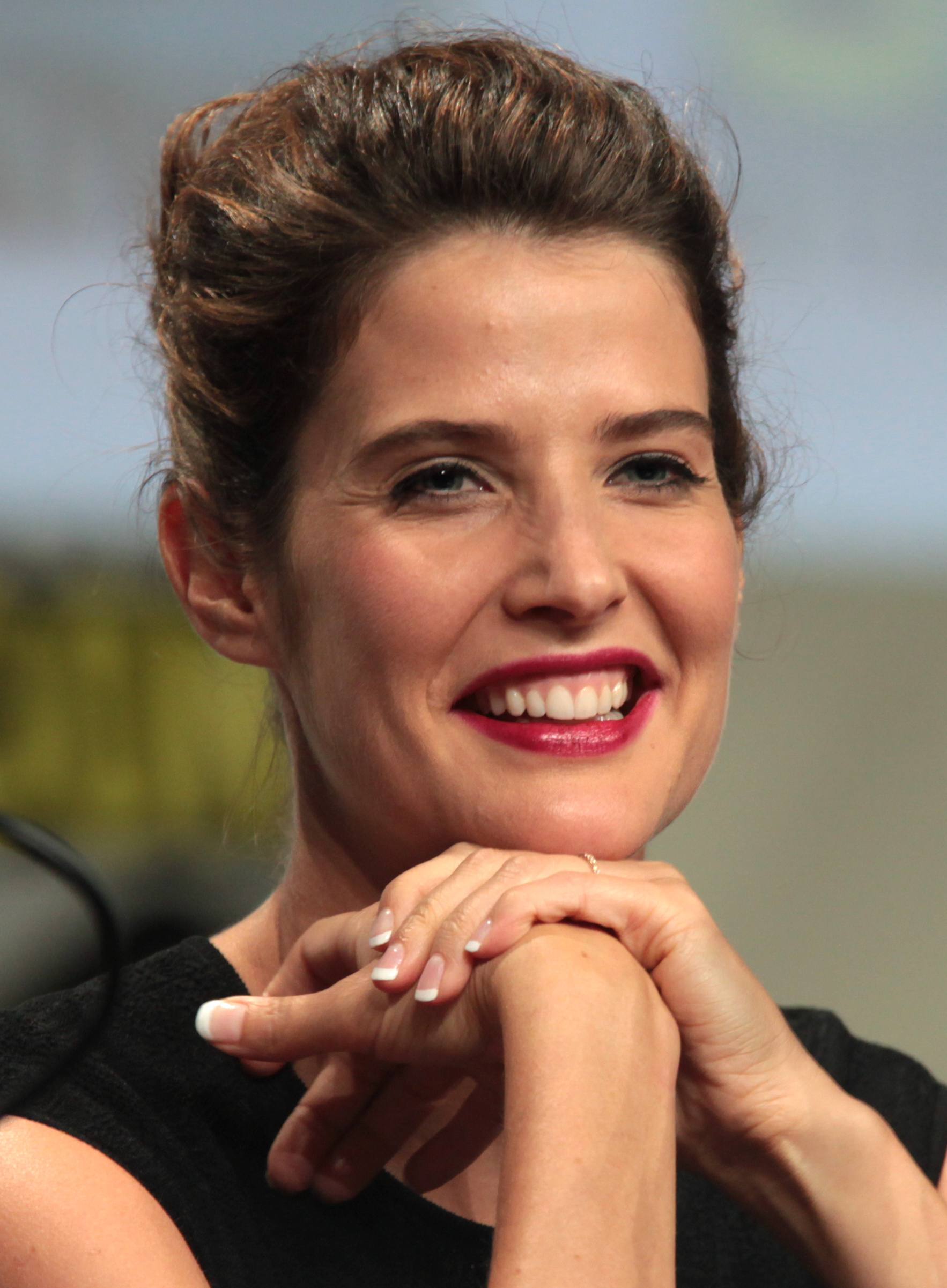
Cobie Smulders

Appears in all 208 episodes of How I Met Your Mother from "Pilot" to "Last Forever", and one episode of How I Met Your Father

Portrayed by Cobie Smulders, Robin Charles Scherbatsky Jr. works as a news reporter for various stations, ending up at World Wide News. She is originally from Vancouver, British Columbia and is a fan of the Vancouver Canucks. Robin was named after her father, who she has some issues with as he wanted a male child. She and Ted have an on-again, off-again relationship. The subject of four episodes, Robin was a teen pop singer named Robin Sparkles. Her first boyfriend, Simon, starred in her second music video. In season 4, Robin moves in with Ted after leaving her short-lived job in Japan. During "The Leap", she and Barney pursue a relationship, but it soon ends.

Robin is frequently made fun of for her tendency to laugh while lying, as well as her references to places and history exclusive to Canada, such as Mount Waddington or Danby's. Though she has stated explicitly that she does not like children, Future Ted mentioned that she eventually grew to like them and even became close to Ted's children. After being unemployed for a while, Robin found out that she would be deported from America if she did not get a job. Barney helped her land a job for an early morning show in "The Possimpible". Soon after she started she got a co-host named Don whom she originally disliked. However, she grew to like him and they dated for a while. In "False Positive", Robin worked as a researcher for World Wide News and eventually moved up to co-anchor after hosting a New Year's Eve show. It is revealed in the season 7 finale that Robin married Barney. They divorce after almost three years of marriage. In 2030, Robin is shown to be living with her dogs in New York when she gets asked out by Ted, a six-year widower by then. A deleted scene reconfirms they rekindled their relationship, while an alternate ending in which Ted is not widowed depicts Robin and Barney as renewing their relationship.

=== Barney Stinson ===
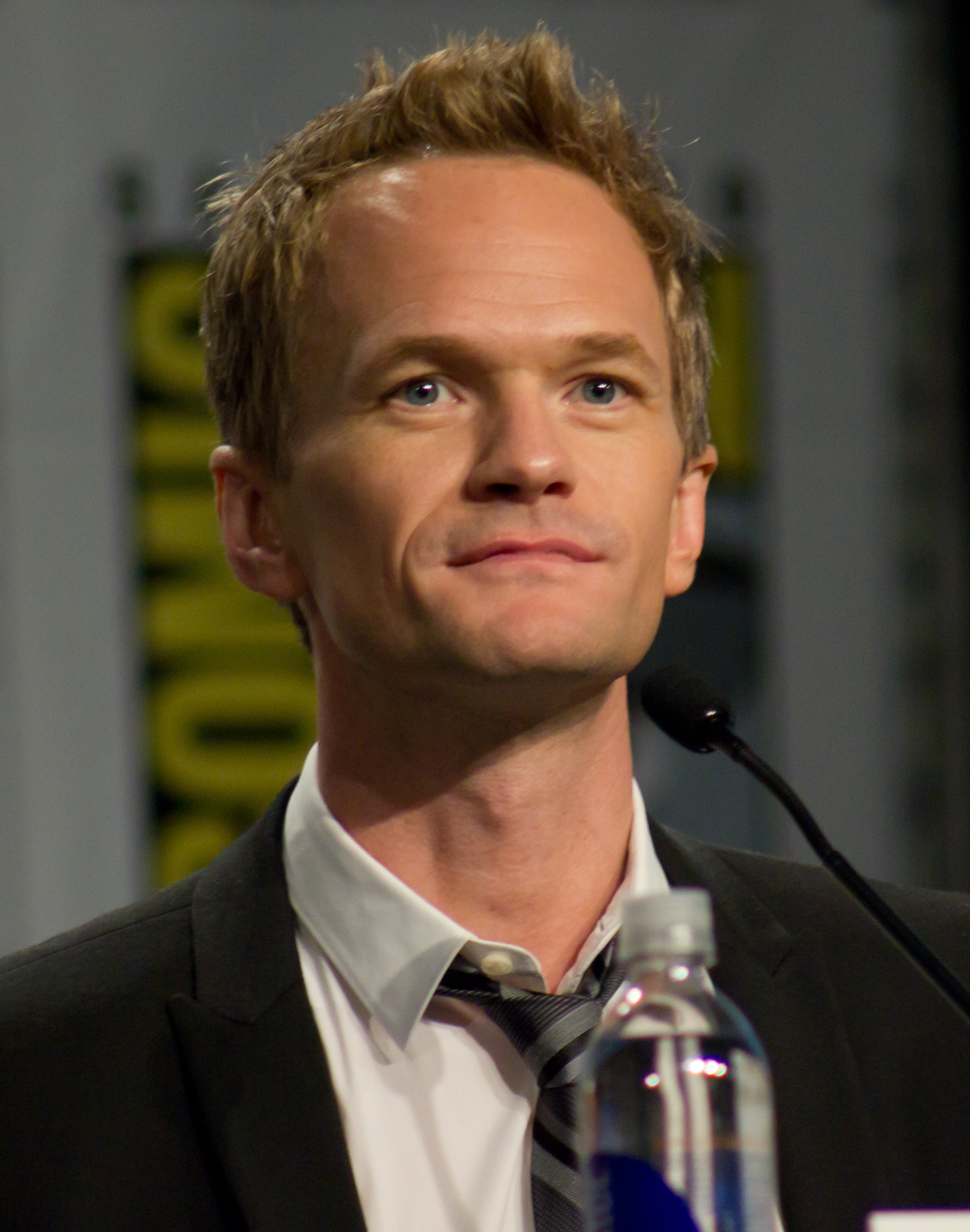
Neil Patrick Harris

Appears in all 208 episodes of How I Met Your Mother from "Pilot" to "Last Forever", and 2 episodes of How I Met Your Father

Portrayed by Neil Patrick Harris, Barnabus "Barney" Stinson is a former womanizer. He is known for wearing suits, playing laser tag, performing magic tricks, and overusing catchphrases such as "Suit up!", "Legend-wait-for-it-dary" and "Challenge accepted!". Barney is the writer of the Bro Code and the Playbook, documenting rules for best friends ("bros") and his favorite moves to use on women.

Barney was raised by a single mother, Loretta, along with his older brother James. He is abandoned by his father. In season 6, Barney's father Jerome returns to his life hoping to make amends. As a young adult, Barney was a long-haired hippie with plans to join the Peace Corps. Soon after his girlfriend rejects him for a businessman, he drastically changes his lifestyle, dressing in suits and accepting a corporate job. Shortly after, he met Ted Mosby at a urinal and announced that he would "teach [Ted] how to live", thus beginning his life with Ted's group of friends.

In season 4, Barney falls in love with Robin and spends the next season hiding it from her. The two get together in season 5, but the relationship is short-lived. After their breakup, Barney returns to one-night stands, but sometimes shows regret in ending his relationship with Robin. In "Desperation Day", Robin introduces him to her friend Nora. Barney and Nora have a brief relationship, but it ends because Barney is unwilling to let himself be honest with her about his feelings. Later, they get back together but Barney cheats on Nora with Robin. In "Challenge Accepted", it is revealed that Barney gets married at some point in the future; in "The Magician's Code", the bride is revealed to be Robin. However, Barney and Robin get divorced in 2016. Barney goes back to having one-night stands, and eventually impregnates a woman. The birth of his daughter, Ellie, effectively causes him to change his ways for good.

=== Lily Aldrin ===
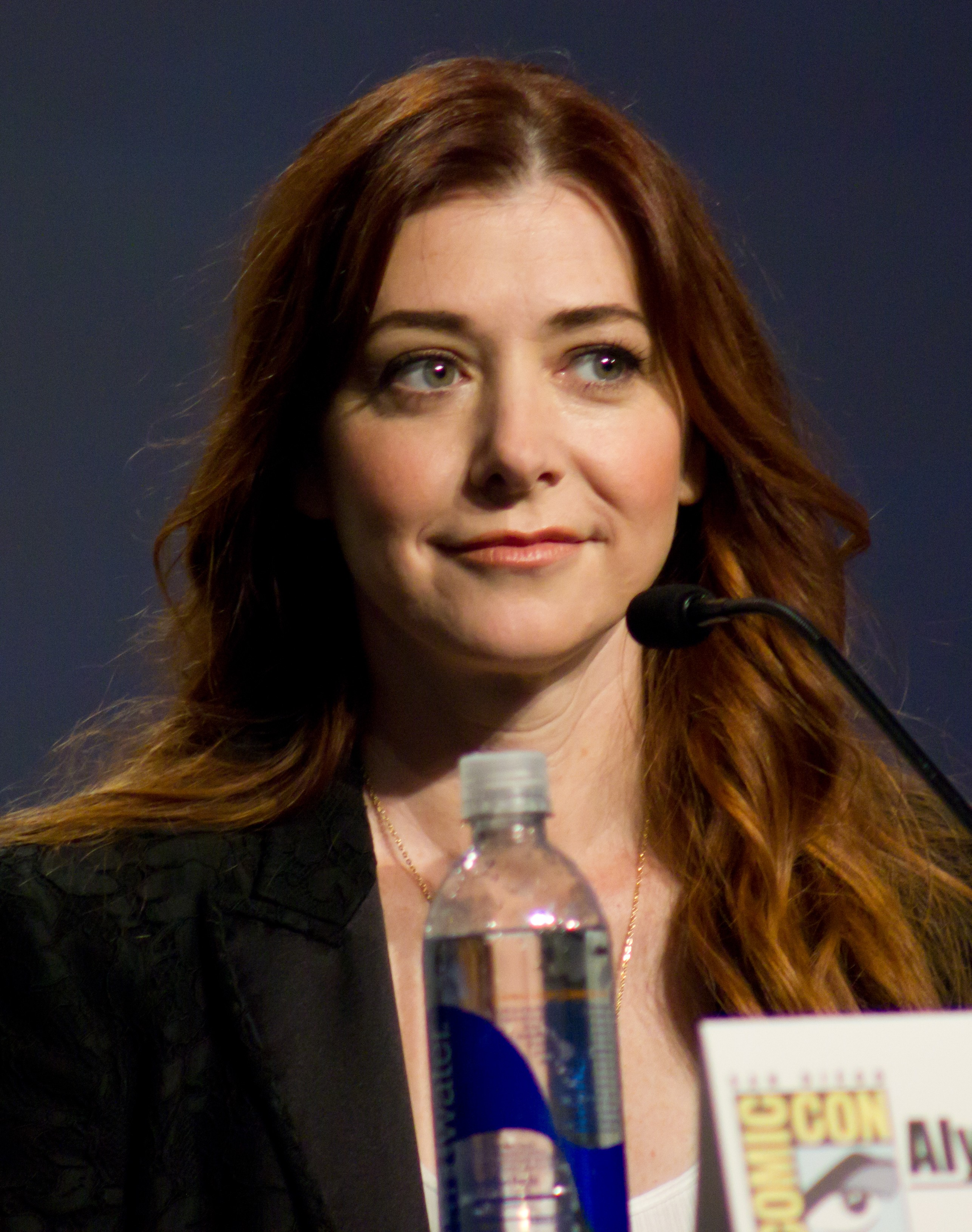
Alyson Hannigan

Appears in 206 episodes from "Pilot" to "Last Forever"

Portrayed by Alyson Hannigan, Lily Aldrin is a kindergarten teacher. She is married to Marshall and grew up in Brooklyn, New York. Like Ted and Marshall, she is a graduate of Wesleyan University and dreams of being an artist. Lily has a huge debt problem because of her impulsive shopping; she is able to hide this from Marshall until they apply for a mortgage in "Dowisetrepla". She is very manipulative, having caused several of Ted's relationships to end when she disliked his date. It has been shown many times that she cannot keep a secret, with a few exceptions: she hides her second pregnancy and keeps Ted's move to Chicago a secret from everyone but Marshall. Another ongoing joke in the show is her implied bisexuality, as evidenced by plenty of commentary as well as a couple instances of her kissing Robin.

Prior to college, Lily dated Scooter. At college, she met Ted and started dating Marshall. She and Marshall were together for 9 years and engaged for almost a year before Lily broke up with Marshall to move to San Francisco for a summer to concentrate on her art. Marshall was so hurt that they stayed separated for a few months after she returned to New York. They eventually get married at the end of season 2. They move into an apartment in "Dowisetrepla"; previously, they had been living with Ted. They consider children for years before feeling "ready". Lily finds out in the season 6 finale that she is pregnant. In the episode "Good Crazy", Lily goes into labor five weeks early and in the episode "The Magician's Code – Part 1", gives birth to Marvin. In season eight, Lily accepts a job as The Captain's art consultant. The Captain later asks her to move to Italy to search for and purchase artwork for his collection; she and Marshall agree to move there. However, this is the cause of disagreement between the couple as Marshall accepts an offer to be a judge without consulting Lily. Lily is revealed to be pregnant with a second child in "Daisy", followed by third child a few years later in "Last Forever".

=== The Doppelgängers ===
In "Double Date", Ted mentions that the group has seen people who look exactly like them. This theme of five doppelgängers, one for each of the main characters (excluding The Mother), continues throughout several episodes.

The first three doppelgängers are seen in "Double Date". "Moustache Marshall" appears on an advert on the side of a bus, and is spotted by Barney in MacLaren's. "Lesbian Robin" is seen in the streets of New York. "Stripper Lily" (known by the name "Jasmine") works at the Lusty Leopard and also appears in "46 Minutes" and "Gary Blauman", eventually marrying Scooter. "Mexican Wrestler Ted" is discovered in "Robots Versus Wrestlers".

Barney's doppelgänger is the most significant; Lily and Marshall want a sign from "the universe" that they are ready to have children, and agree to start trying once they see Barney's double. In "Doppelgangers", Marshall meets a cab driver who he thinks is Barney's doppelgänger, but who turns out to be Barney in disguise. Lily then sees a pretzel vendor and thinks he is the double; in reality, the vendor looks nothing like Barney but they begin to try to have children as Marshall claims it means that Lily is subconsciously ready to have kids. Barney's real doppelgänger, Doctor John Stangel, is revealed in "Bad News". He is a fertility doctor, making Lily uncomfortable as she is convinced he is Barney in disguise.

=== The Mother (Tracy McConnell) ===
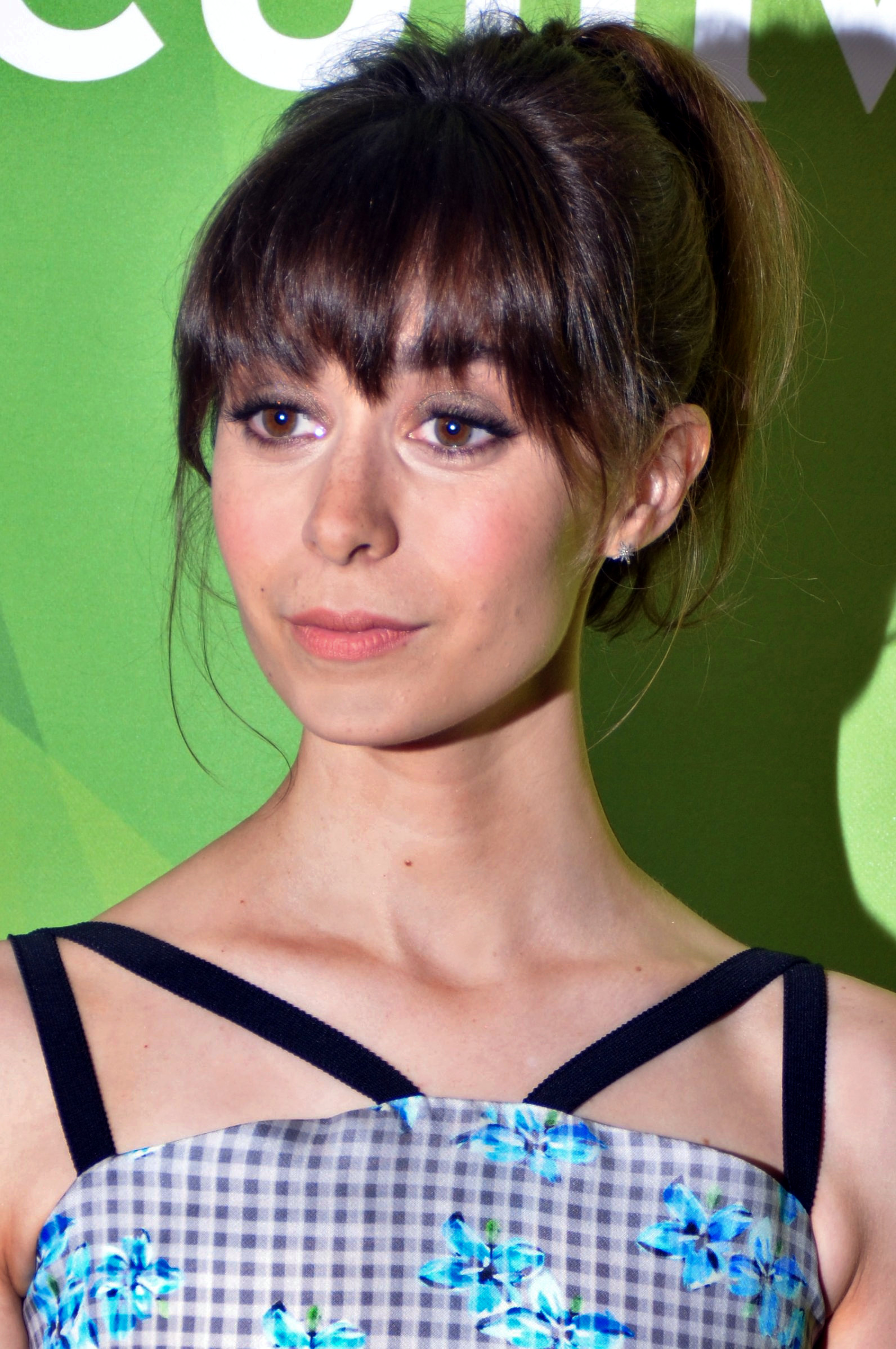
Cristin Milioti

Appears in eight episodes from "Lucky Penny" to "The Time Travelers" as an unseen character, appears in 14 episodes from "Something New" to "Last Forever"

Portrayed by Cristin Milioti, the Mother is the title character of the series; Ted's narration of the series is based around how he met her. While several clues about the Mother are revealed throughout the series (including the story of the yellow umbrella), she is not fully seen until the season eight finale, "Something New". Season 9 reveals more about the Mother through several flashforwards throughout the season and the 200th episode, "How Your Mother Met Me", which shows the years 2005 through 2013 from her perspective. In that episode, it is revealed that her boyfriend Max died on her 21st birthday and that she refrained from dating in the years following; her first boyfriend after Max, Louis, proposed to her the night before Barney and Robin's wedding, but she rejected him, allowing herself to move on.

Ted is shown meeting The Mother in the series finale at the Farhampton train station following Barney and Robin's wedding. They date, get engaged, and have two children called Luke and Penny. In the original ending of the show, The Mother is shown to have been deceased in 2024. Many fans of the show had become emotionally attached to The Mother. In many scenes throughout the show, it was shown how incredibly perfect Ted and Tracy were for each other and how nice she was to everyone. Her death in the series finale was met with considerable dissatisfaction by many viewers.

A petition was started, aiming to rewrite and reshoot the finale. The petition received over 20,000 signatures and considerable online news coverage. An alternate ending was released in the ninth season DVD. In the alternate ending, Tracy is still living when Ted is telling the story in 2030. In the video, future Ted is heard saying, "...When I think how lucky I am to wake up next to your mom every morning, I can't help but be amazed how easy it all really was...", indirectly stating that The Mother is alive. The video ends right after the train passes at Farhampton station and credits start rolling, implying that Ted never went back to Robin as he lived a successful married life with Tracy.

=== Sophie ===
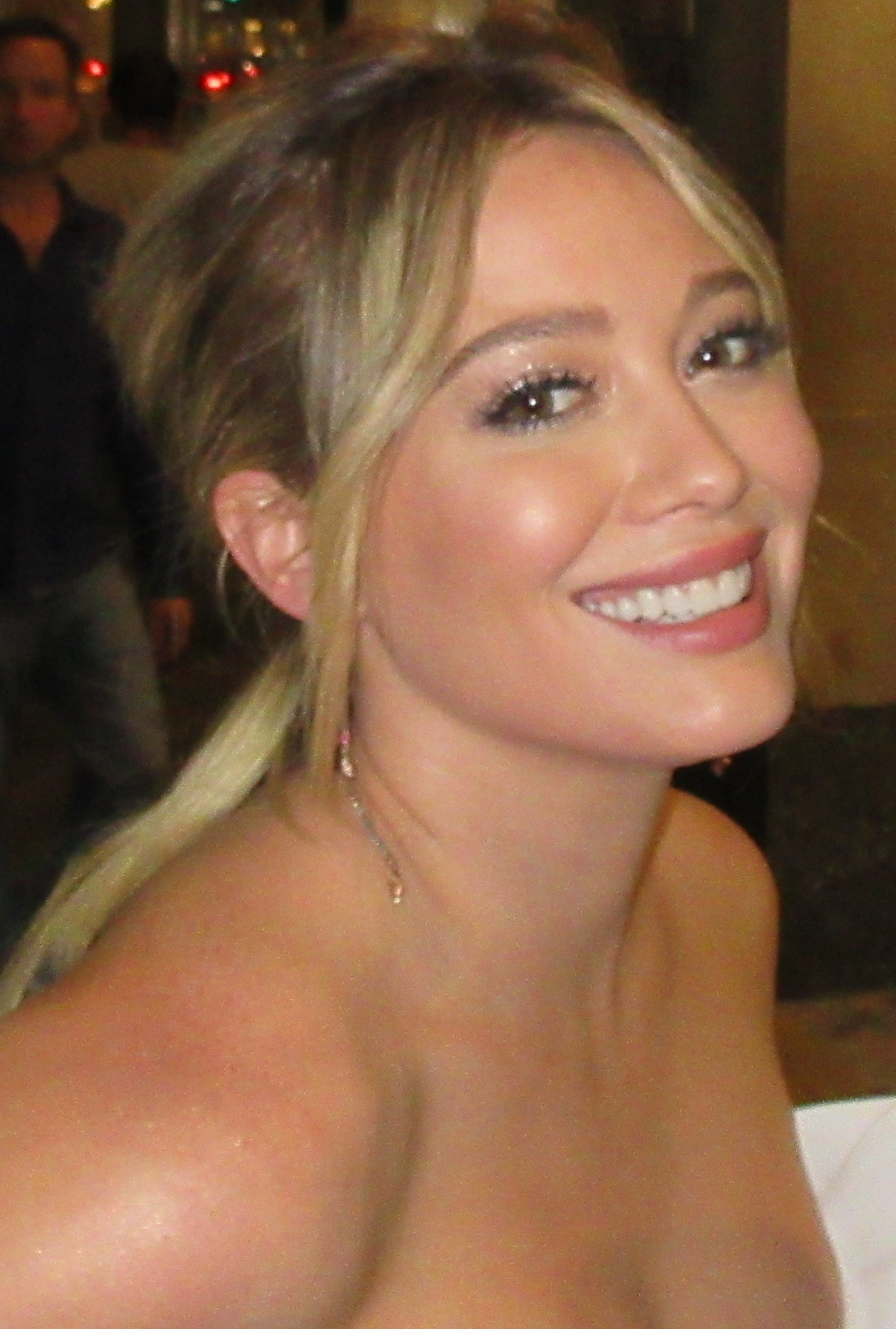
Hilary Duff

Appears in all episodes of How I Met Your Father

Portrayed by Hilary Duff, Sophie is a hopeless romantic, originally searching for her "soulmate" and often discussing destiny controlling things. Though believing in true love, she is unaware of her biological father due to her "party girl" mother having slept with random men. Sophie is also the show's narrator from the future, portrayed by Kim Cattrall, as she tells her son a very long story, with the premise of explaining the events that followed after she met his father.

=== Jesse ===
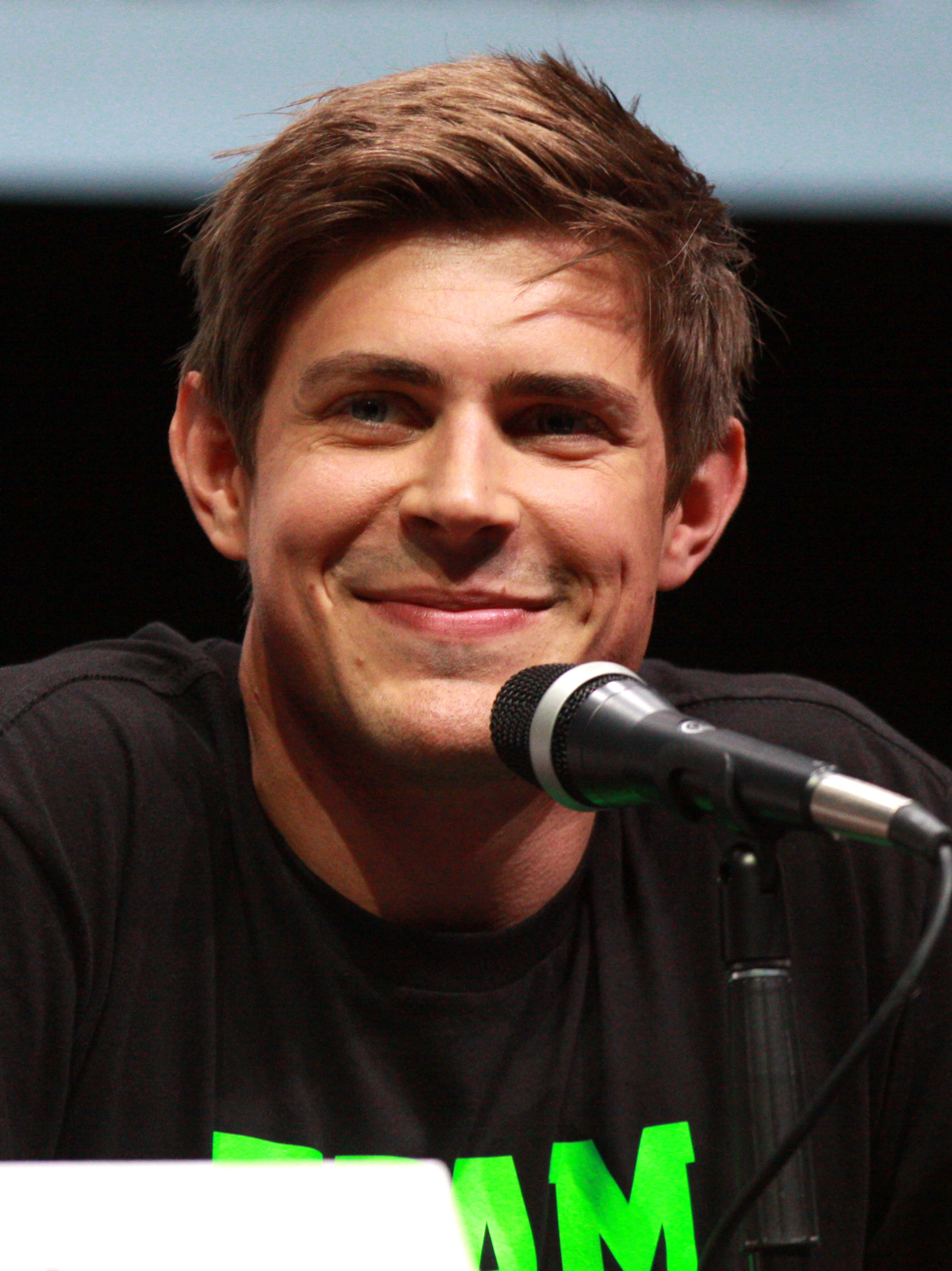
Christopher Lowell

Appears in all episodes of How I Met Your Father

Portrayed by Christopher Lowell, Jesse is an aspiring musician who works as an Uber driver and music teacher, who has become an internet meme after being left by his ex-girlfriend Meredith after a failed marriage proposal. He lives with Sid in Ted, Marshall and Lily's old apartment, and is presented as a possible candidate as Future Sophie's son's father.

=== Valentina ===
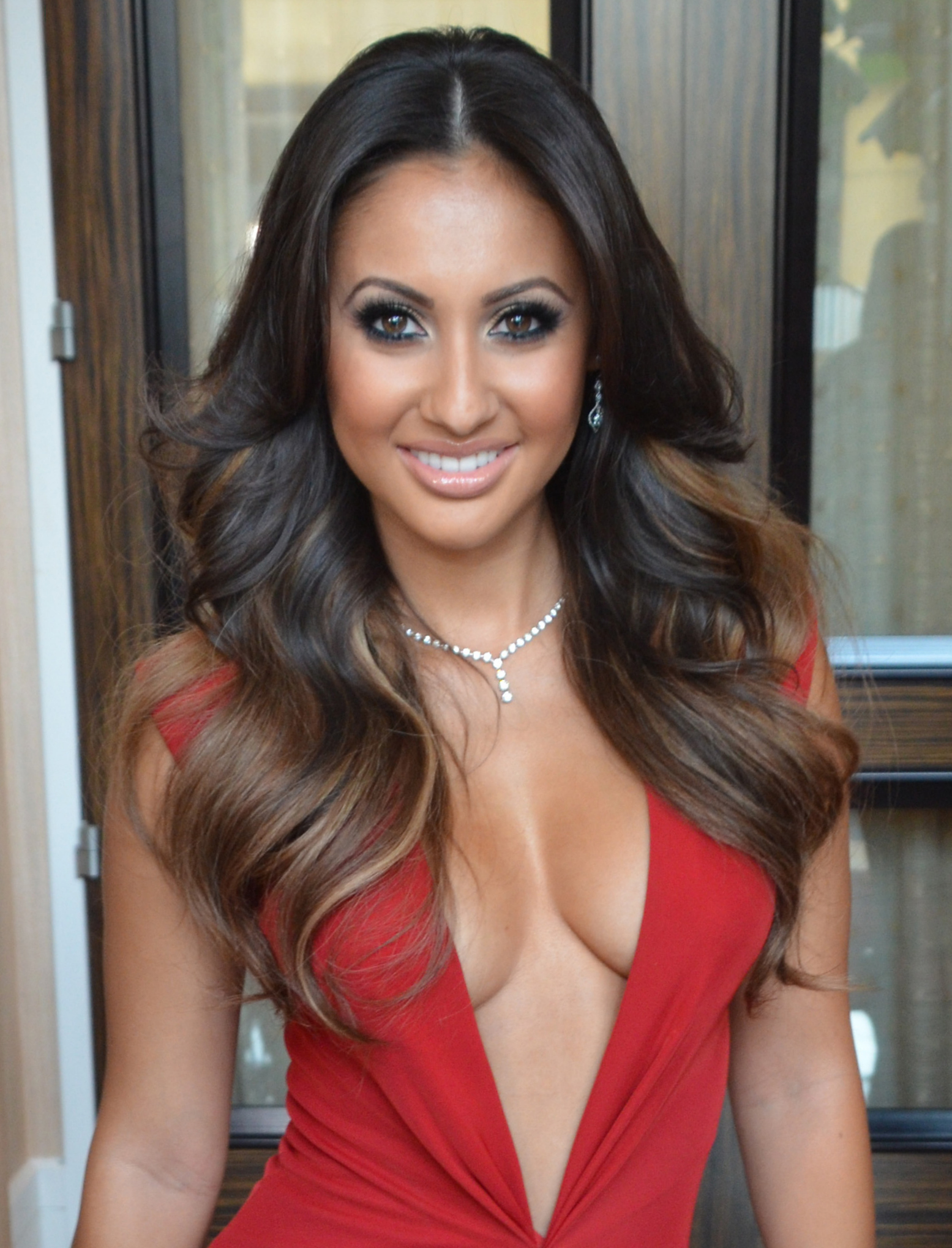
Francia Raisa

Appears in all episodes of How I Met Your Father

Portrayed by Francia Raisa, Valentina is an impulsive assistant-stylist who is also Sophie's best friend and roommate and Charlie's love interest.

=== Sid ===
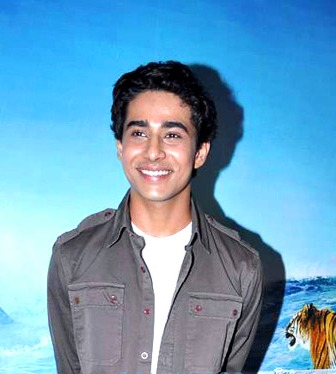
Suraj Sharma

Appears in all episodes of How I Met Your Father

Portrayed by Suraj Sharma, Sid is Jesse's best friend and roommate who owns a bar. He is introduced as engaged to his long-distance girlfriend Hannah, and is presented as a possible candidate as Future Sophie's son's father.

=== Charlie ===
Appears in all episodes of How I Met Your Father

Portrayed by Tom Ainsley, Charlie is a British aristocrat who abandons his inheritance to follow his love interest Valentina to New York after meeting her at London Fashion Week (having previously done the same with three other women). He later moves in with Ellen and the two become roommates, before being hired by Sid as a bartender. He was presented as a possible candidate as Future Sophie's son's father, but instead has a child with Valentina.

=== Ellen ===
Appears in all episodes of How I Met Your Father

Portrayed by Tien Tran, Ellen is Jesse's adoptive sister who moves to New York City to find romance after her divorce from her wife, later moving in with Charlie, with the two becoming roommates. She owns a produce farm.

== Secondary characters ==
=== Penny and Luke Mosby ===
First Appearance: "Pilot"; Last Appearance: "Last Forever"

Penny and Luke are Ted's children, teenagers in 2030 as Ted narrates the story of how he met their mother. Penny is portrayed by Lyndsy Fonseca while Luke is portrayed by David Henrie. Georgina Bays, the daughter of Carter Bays, has portrayed Ted's daughter as an infant. Penny and Luke as young children are portrayed by Katie Silverman and Dexter Cross in "Rally".

The names of Ted's children were unknown until "Unpause". Before he had met their mother, Ted had repeatedly expressed the desire to name them Luke and Leia. The children initially appear only in the framing narrative, though Penny appears as an infant in "Trilogy Time", "Lobster Crawl" and "Unpause". Both Penny and Luke appear as young children in "Rally", when they greet their parents on New Year's Day in 2022.

Since the actors playing Ted's children were going to age quickly, stock footage of them was shot in 2006, to be used in later episodes. Additionally, footage for the series finale was shot and the actors were made to sign non-disclosure agreements; Fonseca said in 2013 that she did not "remember what the secret was", although Henrie thought he remembered. A season nine promotional video was filmed with the same actors, now adults, joking that they have been listening to Ted tell the story for eight years, and was first shown at the 2013 San Diego Comic-Con.

=== Marvin W. Eriksen ===
Appears in 27 episodes from "The Magician's Code – Part 1" to "Daisy"

Marvin Wait-for-it Eriksen is the son of Lily and Marshall. In "Challenge Accepted", Lily discovers she is pregnant after a long-running storyline of Marshall and Lily trying to have kids. Marvin is born in "The Magician's Code – Part 1"; Marshall arrives just in time for the birth. Barney helped Marshall arrive in the hospital, in return for choosing the middle name of the baby: "Wait-for-it". Marvin appears in many episodes after that, usually causing Marshall and Lily to become stressed and sleep deprived. In "Who Wants to Be a Godparent?", Ted, Barney and Robin all become godparents of Marvin. "Bedtime Stories" is based around Marvin going to sleep.

Marvin was played by twins, and several actors have been credited as playing him; Jake Elliott, August Maturo and Spencer Ralston have played the part of Marvin during various flashforwards. Craig Thomas said that they were "tending to the fact that [Marshall and Lily] have a baby more than other shows have", although Marvin "doesn't take over the show."

=== Ranjit Singh ===
Appears in 22 episodes from "Pilot" to "Last Forever"

Played by Marshall Manesh, Ranjit is a cab driver from Bangladesh. He drives the main characters around during several significant moments of their lives; for instance, he drives Marshall and Lily in a limo shortly after they are married and helps Ted with a "two-minute date" in "Ten Sessions". In "The Sexless Innkeeper", he and his wife Falguni go on a double date with Marshall and Lily, although they do not enjoy it. He also appears in episodes such as "The Limo", "Rabbit or Duck", "The Goat" and "Three Days of Snow". In "Gary Blauman", Future Ted reveals that Ranjit became rich through investments and bought a limo service.

Ranjit is the only recurring character to appear in all nine seasons.

=== Carl the Bartender ===
Appears in 20 episodes from "Pilot" to "Last Forever"

Played by Joe Nieves, Carl is the bartender at MacLaren's, which is frequented by the main characters. He manages the bar. Carl eventually has a son who helps him at MacLaren's.

Joe Nieves received the part after the scene he was supposed to be in was cut from the pilot but no one had told him, and he turned up on set in a police officer costume. As no one wanted to tell him that they had cut his scene, they gave him the role of Carl. Carl is named after one of the assistants to the producers.

=== Wendy ===
Appears in 17 episodes from "Return of the Shirt" to "Garbage Island"

Played by Charlene Amoia, Wendy is a waitress from MacLaren's bar. Characterized as sweet and somewhat naive, she is well liked by the main characters. Barney once had a brief relationship with her. It is also revealed in "Garbage Island" that Wendy the Waitress falls in love and is later married to Marshall's ex-co worker Meeker (Daniel G. O'Brien), who found out at the time they both hate Marshall after his "Go Green" fiasco. She and Meeker have three kids.

=== Victoria ===
Appears in 16 episodes from "The Wedding" to "Sunrise"

Played by Ashley Williams. A baker at The Buttercup Bakery, Victoria meets Ted in "The Wedding" at the wedding reception of Ted's friends, for whom Victoria had baked the wedding cake. They agree to spend the evening together anonymously in order to preserve the memory of the night, despite their attraction to one another. However, Ted quickly finds her and they begin an intense romantic relationship. The relationship is complicated when Victoria is offered a cooking fellowship in Germany and they attempt to remain together in a long-distance relationship. However, Ted kisses Robin and they break up.

Victoria reappears in Ted's life five years later, when she is catering the Architect's Ball that Ted is attending at the end of "The Naked Truth". During their reunion, Ted apologizes for cheating on her and she accepts his apology. However, he becomes upset when he learns that she began dating Klaus, whom she met not long after arriving in Germany, almost immediately after they broke up. During their ensuing argument, they begin to remember what they loved about their relationship together and end up kissing. Victoria responds to the kiss with the revelation that Klaus intends to propose to her soon and she and Ted part on amicable terms, though she also warns Ted that his existing relationships with Robin and Barney are stopping him from finding his true love.

In "The Magician's Code", Ted, having recently reconciled with Robin, follows her suggestion to contact Victoria in hopes of learning if she ever got married. When they meet, Ted is stunned to see that Victoria has secretly run away from her wedding to Klaus. Recalling his own experience at being left at the altar by Stella, Ted attempts to have Victoria return to her wedding to at least inform Klaus that she has run away, but they learn that Klaus has also run away from the wedding, as he has realized that he and Victoria are not meant to be together. Ted and Victoria's renewed relationship is short-lived; when Ted proposes to her, she presents an ultimatum: he must end his friendship with Robin to be with her. Since he is unwilling to give up his friendship with Robin, Victoria breaks up with him. She is later revealed to have returned to Germany and sends him Robin's locket, which she had taken with her.

Bays and Thomas planned to have Victoria as a backup Mother in case CBS decided to cancel the series after season 2. Another possible storyline was Williams wearing a fat suit to portray Victoria having become, according to Bays, "enormously fat" because of her baking career. Victoria was described as Ted's best girlfriend by People magazine.

=== Judy Eriksen ===
Appears in 15 episodes from "Belly Full of Turkey" to "Daisy"

Played by Suzie Plakson, Judy Eriksen is the mother of Marshall. Married to the late Marvin Eriksen, she has three children: Marvin, Marcus and Marshall. She lives in St. Cloud, Minnesota and is known to have a tense, sometimes adversarial relationship with Lily, leaving Marshall torn as he loves Lily, but has trouble understanding how she could dislike his mother. In "The Over-Correction," she begins a sexual relationship with Lily's father, Mickey.

=== James Stinson ===
Appears in 13 episodes from "Single Stamina" to "The End of the Aisle"

Played by Wayne Brady, James is Barney's gay African-American half-brother; they are very alike and act as each other's "wingmen", but this all changes when James meets Tom, his future husband. Barney tries to stop his brother from marrying but changes his mind when he learns that they are adopting a baby. James marries Tom and they have a son named Eli. In the season 6 episode "Cleaning House," James finds out his father is Sam Gibbs after he and Barney discover an unsent letter that their mother Loretta addressed to him. At the end of "The Rebound Girl", it is revealed that James and Tom have adopted an infant daughter named Sadie. In "Coming Back", James announces that he is getting a divorce after Tom discovered him cheating. Robin wins James' wedding ring in "The Poker Game" and refuses to give it back because James has been saying that she and Barney should not get married. Barney initially stands by his brother, but then realizes that James' selfishness is what caused his own marriage to fail. James reveals that Gary Blauman was one of the guys that he cheated on Tom with in "Gary Blauman". Future Ted explains to his children that James and Tom did eventually get back together, and raised Eli and Sadie as a happy family.

=== Zoey Pierson ===
Appears in 13 episodes from "Architect of Destruction" to "Gary Blauman"

Played by Jennifer Morrison. One of Ted's girlfriends. Ted first meets Zoey when she was an activist protesting the destruction of a historic New York building, the Arcadian, in "Architect of Destruction". At first Ted is attracted to her, even though he is the architect responsible for the building's demolition. However, when she discovers this fact, she turns on him, and the two develop a mutually antagonistic relationship. In "Natural History", Ted meets her rich husband, who calls himself The Captain, at a black-tie event at a museum. Zoey spends Thanksgiving hanging out with the gang in "Blitzgiving" because her husband is spending it with his daughter; surprisingly, it is Ted who convinces the group to let her do so, after deducing that she is hurting by her stepdaughter's rejection of her. Zoey is (by marriage) a van Smoot, whose family is shown to have owned the mansion in which Marshall and Lily were married, and an apartment in the Alberta building. In "Oh Honey", Zoey divorces the Captain and gets together with Ted. However, they break up in "Landmarks" due to tensions caused by the Arcadian. Zoey appears in "Challenge Accepted", where she unsuccessfully tries reuniting with Ted. In "Gary Blauman", Future Ted reveals that Zoey continued campaigning for various causes.

=== Patrice ===
Appears in 12 episodes from "The Stinson Missile Crisis" to "The End of the Aisle"

Played by Ellen D. Williams, Patrice is a World Wide News employee. Robin hates her permanent state of cheerful friendliness and often yells at Patrice to shut up (even when Patrice hasn't said anything) and at one point fires her out of spite (though she recognizes she was wrong and rehires her almost immediately, not that Patrice was upset or even noticed she'd been fired in the first place). In season 8, Patrice joins Barney's "The Robin" play by pretending to date him as part of his successful long-con effort to win Robin's love. In "Gary Blauman", it is shown that Patrice later moves on to becoming a radio talk show host.

=== Marvin Eriksen ===
Appears in 12 episodes from "Belly Full of Turkey" to "Sunrise"

Played by Bill Fagerbakke, Marvin Eriksen is: Judy's husband; the father of Marvin, Marcus and Marshall; father-in-law of Lily; grandfather of Marshall and Lily's three children and Marcus and Sarah's children, Marcus Jr. and Martin. He was very close to Marshall and the rest of his family prior to his passing in early 2011. After "Last Words", set at Marvin's funeral, Carter Bays stated that they intended to bring back Bill Fagerbakke as Marshall's father in future episodes during flashbacks.

=== Nora ===
Appears in 11 episodes from "Desperation Day" to "Slapsgiving 3: Slappointment in Slapmarra"

Played by Nazanin Boniadi, Nora is an English co-worker of Robin's who meets Barney the day before Valentine's Day. Though he is interested in her, Barney is reluctant to admit it, despite Robin's encouragement. During his first formal date with Nora, she reveals her wishes to eventually marry and settle down and invites him to meet her parents, both of which Barney accepts as things he wants. At the end of their date, however, he tells her that his words were a lie and criticizes Nora's dreams, which seemingly ends the relationship. Though Barney is convinced that he was lying to her, he later realizes that he does want to marry and settle down. He gets a second chance with Nora, when he convinces her that he will be honest in their relationship. They start dating but break up in "Tick Tick Tick" after Barney confesses to cheating on her with Robin.

=== Mickey Aldrin ===
Appears in 11 episodes from "Slapsgiving 2: Revenge of the Slap" to "Daisy"

Played by Chris Elliott, Mickey Aldrin is Lily's father. Obsessed with attempting to launch Aldrin Games, his unsuccessful board game creator business, he was frequently absent, distant, and unreliable throughout her childhood. He and Lily did not have a close relationship during the first few seasons. As the series progressed he gradually redeems himself. He eventually moves in with Marshall and Lily at Lily's grandparents' home in Long Island. Once there he refuses to leave his childhood home, despite being unwelcome; he does eventually agree to leave at Lily and Marshall's insistence, although they let him stay after he makes pancakes for them. From then on his hobbies make him an occasional nuisance in the household, eventually accidentally burning the house down after Marshall and Lily had returned to the apartment. This leads to him joining them in Manhattan and despite Lily's expectations, he proves very helpful in looking after his grandson Marvin W. Eriksen. He reveals that he had taken much better care of Lily prior to her going to school; only when she started kindergarten and he found himself at loose ends did he go to the racetrack on a whim, where he developed a gambling addiction.

=== Linus ===
Appears in 11 season 9 episodes from "Coming Back" to "Daisy"

Played by Robert Belushi, Linus is a bartender at the Farhampton Inn. Lily pays him $100 to make sure she always has a drink in her hand during the weekend of Barney and Robin's wedding. Throughout season 9, he is constantly seen handing her drinks followed by Lily saying "Thank you, Linus." It is revealed in "Daisy" that these drinks are non-alcoholic as Lily correctly suspects she is pregnant.

=== Stella Zinman ===
Appears in 10 episodes from "Ten Sessions" to "Sunrise"

Played by Sarah Chalke, Stella is Ted's dermatologist, who removes his ill-advised butterfly tattoo. He attempts to convince her to date him over the course of the episode "Ten Sessions". Stella initially refuses, wanting to focus on her daughter Lucy, but eventually agrees to go on a two-minute lunch date. They start dating soon after. In the last episode of season three, Ted proposes to Stella, and in the season four premiere, she accepts. In "Shelter Island", after her sister's wedding falls apart, Ted and she agree to take over the wedding. She ends up leaving Ted at the altar and getting back together with Tony, her ex-boyfriend and father of Lucy. She later appears in "Right Place Right Time", where she is still with Tony.

=== Kevin Venkataraghavan ===
Appears in 10 episodes from "The Stinson Missile Crisis" to "Gary Blauman"

Played by Kal Penn, Kevin is originally introduced as Robin's therapist but later becomes her boyfriend. She cheats on him with Barney, although he never discovers this. It is unclear, however, if Kevin correctly assumes what happened when saying, "something that needs to be said, doesnt always need to be heard." He proposed to Robin before she told him of her infertility. He still wanted to marry her, suggesting they could adopt or use a surrogate, but when Robin made it clear to him that she did not want to have any children, they broke up. In "Gary Blauman", Future Ted says that Kevin ended up with Jeanette.

=== Quinn Garvey ===
Appears in 10 episodes from "The Drunk Train" to "The Bro Mitzvah"

Played by Becki Newton, Quinn is a romantic interest for Barney in season 7, as she has a scheming personality similar to him. In season 7, episode 18, she tells Barney that at the strip club, she goes by the name Karma. Barney becomes interested in her without realizing she is a stripper at the Lusty Leopard, despite being a frequent patron. Quinn initially scams Barney out of a large amount of money, but gives Barney a chance. Due to Barney's insecurity, she quits her job as a stripper and accommodates most of his demands regarding his apartment when she moves in with him. Barney proposes to her in "The Magician's Code". However, due to their inability to trust one another, they break up in "The Pre-Nup". Quinn makes a brief return in "The Bro Mitzvah" as a stripper hired for Barney's bachelor party, much to his chagrin.

=== Sandy Rivers ===
Appears in 10 episodes from "Nothing Good Happens After 2 A.M." to "Gary Blauman"

Played by Alexis Denisof, Alyson Hannigan's real life husband, Sandy is a narcissistic lecherous anchorman. He debuts as Robin's colleague at Metro News One and spares no opportunity to ask her out. Ted and Marshall make fun of him during his segments. He resigns from the network to take up a job at CNN but recommends Robin to succeed him as lead anchor. Sandy and Robin cross paths again in season 6 as colleagues at World Wide News, where he is often seen hitting on young female interns. Sandy's inappropriate behavior ruins his career in the US and he does not change his ways even as he anchors a news show in Russia.

=== Marcus Eriksen ===
Appears in 10 episodes from "Belly Full of Turkey" to "Something New"

Marcus Eriksen is one of Marshall's brothers, known for pranking Marshall. He and the rest of his brothers often played roughly with each other. In "Who Wants to Be a Godparent?", Marcus left his wife and two children for his dream job of being a bartender. Marcus is often seen at family events such as his father's funeral.

=== Loretta Stinson ===
Appears in 9 episodes from "The Stinsons" to "The End of the Aisle"

Played by Frances Conroy, Loretta is Barney's mother. Prior to her first proper appearance, she appeared from the neck down voiced by Megan Mullally in "Single Stamina" and "Showdown". Loretta had a very promiscuous lifestyle and neither Barney nor James knows who his real father is until they are adults. She also tends to tell ridiculous lies to her sons to cover up bad news, such as saying Barney's father is Bob Barker. So that his mother would not worry about him, Barney hired actors to pretend to be his family; when he is forced to reveal the truth in "The Stinsons", Loretta is not upset. She returns in "Cleaning House": the gang go to her home as she is planning to move. Though she had hidden the identities of James and Barney's fathers so that she could be both mother and father to them, she eventually discloses who both of their fathers are.

=== Arthur Hobbs ===
Appears in 9 episodes from "The Chain of Screaming" to "The Pre-Nup"

Played by Bob Odenkirk, Arthur is a boss at Goliath National Bank and was also Marshall's boss at Nicholson, Hewitt & West. Due to his habit of screaming at his employees, he is nicknamed "Artillery Arthur." He has a dog named Tugboat.

=== Virginia Mosby ===
Appears in 8 episodes from "Brunch" to "Sunrise"

Played by Cristine Rose. Virginia is Ted's mother, married to Alfred for 30 years before they get divorced. She marries Clint in "Home Wreckers". Barney jokes on several occasions that he had sex with Virginia, although it is revealed in "Unpause" that they only shared a kiss.

=== Daphne ===
Appears in 8 season 9 episodes from "The Locket" to "Mom and Dad"

Played by Sherri Shepherd. When she, Marshall and Marvin get kicked off a plane, they spend the first half of season 9 travelling together. Marshall gets to know Daphne through the journey; she has a daughter and is worried that she is not a good mother.

=== Brad Morris ===
Appears in 7 episodes from "Ted Mosby: Architect" to "Twelve Horny Women"

Played by Joe Manganiello, Brad is a friend of Marshall from law school. Brad and Marshall begin to hang out after they both discover they are single, following breakups with their respective girlfriends, Kara and Lily. The bromance between Brad and Marshall becomes increasingly awkward after they go to brunch and a musical together. Eventually, Brad gets back together with his girlfriend. He attends Marshall's bachelor party and wedding and gets punched in the face by Barney when he tries to kiss Robin, although he bears no hard feelings. He appears in "The Stamp Tramp", claiming to be in need of help but later revealing that he is the opposition lawyer in a big court case, putting Marshall's job at risk. The trial takes place in "Twelve Horny Women" and Gruber Pharmaceuticals are found guilty but only have to pay $25,000, because the judge is biased due to his attraction to Brad; this leads to Marshall becoming a judge, as he realizes that is the position from which to effect the most change. His image appears in a flash forward in "Rally" when a news report shows him leading in exit polls over Marshall for New York State Supreme Court Judge in 2020.

=== The Captain ===
Appears in 7 episodes from "Natural History" to "Daisy"

Played by Kyle MacLachlan, George van Smoot (known by his nickname "The Captain") is introduced as Zoey Pierson's husband at a gala at the Natural History Museum. He is obsessed with boats, an interest that Zoey does not share. Despite the Captain's frightening demeanor, such as the murderous look he has in his eyes, he proves to be generous, if rather strange; he is also seen to be somewhat shy because of the apparent age gap between him and most of Zoey's peers. While he comes to like Ted, Ted's fear of the Captain is exacerbated by the fact that Ted and Zoey are attracted to one another. Zoey eventually divorces the Captain and leaves him for Ted. A year after Ted breaks up with Zoey, the Captain unexpectedly runs into Ted, Robin and Lily at a gallery show. He reveals that he holds no hard feelings for Ted regarding his divorce with Zoey. During the gallery show, Lily's advice about artwork, while initially dismissed by the Captain, proves to be invaluable and the Captain ends up hiring Lily as his new art consultant in "The Ashtray". He announces his intention to move to Rome for a year and asks for Lily and her family to accompany him; following a fight between Marshall and Lily, they do live in Italy for a year. The Captain has three Olympic gold medals in fencing and ends up engaged to Becky.

=== Nick Podarutti ===
Appears in 7 episodes from "Hopeless" to "Splitsville"

Played by Michael Trucco, Nick is a love interest of Robin. They originally met in a clothes shop and later came face-to-face in a bar called "Hopeless". Each had a crush on the other. Although Nick was supposed to be a recurring character in season 7, Michael Trucco could not return as he was playing Justin Patrick in the second season of Fairly Legal. Instead, he began dating Robin in season 8. Nick is characterized as overly emotional and unintelligent, and in "Splitsville", Robin begins to get annoyed by these traits (Nick's groin injury prevents the two from having sex, so she begins to notice his personality more). They break up in the same episode, after Barney makes an impassioned speech about being in love with Robin; although he tells her that he was lying, it is later revealed he was telling the truth.

=== Robin Sr. ===
Appears in 7 episodes from "Happily Ever After" to "The End of the Aisle"

Played by Eric Braeden in "Happily Ever After" and Ray Wise in all other appearances, Robin Charles Scherbatsky Sr. is an overbearing father who wanted a son. When the baby (Robin) turned out to be a girl, he raises her as a son, teaching her stereotypically male activities such as hunting. Robin Sr expresses his disappointment of his daughter over the years; he has very little contact with her, becoming married without telling her. The two eventually reconcile.

=== Bilson ===
Appears in 7 episodes from "Life Among the Gorillas" to "The Leap"

Played by Bryan Callen. He works for Goliath National Bank as Barney and Marshall's co-worker and fires Ted when he designed an Employee Termination Room that was too "inspired".

=== Scooter ===
Appears in 7 episodes from "Best Prom Ever" to "Gary Blauman"

Played by David Burtka, Neil Patrick Harris' real life husband, Scooter is Lily's old high-school boyfriend and is obsessed with her. They broke up during their high-school prom after being in a relationship for a long time. Scooter appears over several seasons, during which he fails to win back Lily at her wedding, works as a waiter in a fine-dining restaurant and as a cafeteria server at her school. A flashback shows that Lily intimidated Scooter into hanging out with her during her days as a bully in 1994. Scooter eventually marries Lily's doppelganger, Jasmine the stripper.

=== Gary Blauman ===
Appears in 6 episodes from "Life Among the Gorillas" to "The End of the Aisle"

Played by Taran Killam, Cobie Smulders' real life husband, Gary was Barney and Marshall's coworker until he quit, having snapped after being shouted at during a board meeting. In "The Chain of Screaming", Barney claims his life went downhill after being fired and that he eventually died. However, Blauman appears in later episodes; he inexplicably starts hanging out with Bilson when the two of them start working for Goliath National Bank. In "Gary Blauman", it is revealed that he slept with Barney's brother James, in an affair leading to Tom and James nearly getting divorced.

=== Don Frank ===
Appears in 6 episodes from "The Playbook" to "Doppelgangers"

Played by Ben Koldyke, Don is Robin's boyfriend and co-anchor in season 5, despite Robin originally disliking him. Robin decides to move into his apartment in "Twin Beds". She is offered a job in Chicago but decides to stay for him. When offered the same job, Don accepts. In "Unfinished", a drunken Robin is shown calling him, leaving death threats as she never got over their breakup.

=== Jeanette Peterson ===
Appears in 5 episodes from "P.S. I Love You" to "Gary Blauman"

Played by Abby Elliott, Jeanette is the last person Ted dates before The Mother. Clinically insane, she is a New York Police Department officer who stalks Ted for roughly a year and a half after he was featured in a magazine, Jeanette is described by the gang as "crazy" after she messes up Ted's apartment, destroys Barney's Playbook and throws Robin's locket off a bridge. It is revealed in "Gary Blauman" that she ended up with Kevin the psychiatrist.

=== Becky ===
Appears in 5 episodes from "Subway Wars" to "Daisy"

Played by Laura Bell Bundy, Becky is Robin's replacement co-anchor for Don Frank at the morning talk show Come On, Get Up New York!, and starts to eclipse Robin in the show. Her hyperactivity and cheerfulness wins over the production staff, but Robin dislikes her as she fails to remain professional on camera. In "Canning Randy", she does a commercial about boats, giving her the nickname "Boats Boats Boats". She marries The Captain.

=== Curtis ===
Appears in 5 season 9 episodes from "Coming Back" to "Vesuvius"

Played by Roger Bart. He is the front desk clerk at the Farhampton Inn, who works there until at least 2024. He is unintentionally condescending to Ted upon learning he is single. When The Mother shows up at the inn in the middle of the night, he gives her a key to Robin's mother's empty room.

=== Alfred Mosby ===
Appears in 3 episodes from "Brunch" to "Last Words"

Played by Michael Gross. Alfred is Ted's father, married to Virginia for 30 years before they get divorced. He shares similar views on romance to Ted, being described as a "head-in-the-clouds romantic" by Virginia.

== Guest stars ==
As themselves

- Maury Povich in "Subway Wars": a recurring joke in the episode is that the gang see Maury Povich everywhere and he appears in many scenes that occur simultaneously.
- Regis Philbin, along with Marshall, tries to track down "The Best Burger in New York". He also hosts the fictional show Million Dollar Heads or Tails.
- Heidi Klum, Alessandra Ambrosio, Marisa Miller, Miranda Kerr and Adriana Lima of Victoria's Secret appear in "The Yips".
- Marshall imagines a conversation between him and pictures of Kim Kardashian, Spencer Pratt and Heidi Montag on the front page of his magazine in "Benefits". Scenes were shot on November 12, 2008.
- Boyz II Men (Wanya Morris, Nathan Morris and Shawn Stockman) sing "You Just Got Slapped" at the end of "Slapsgiving 3: Slappointment in Slapmarra". Their appearance was described as "a decent surprise" by one critic; another said their cameo "didn't make sense"; a third described it as "way random".
- "Weird Al" Yankovic reads a fan letter from Ted in "Noretta".
- Ralph Macchio and William Zabka appear in "The Bro Mitzvah" as a surprise at Barney's bachelor party; William Zabka also appears in 6 other episodes from "The Broken Code" to "The End of the Aisle", attending Barney's wedding.
- Emmitt Smith guest stars in "Monday Night Football": Barney meets him when he tries to find out the Super Bowl result. One critic said his "60-second bit was not funny".
- Jim Nantz appears in "Perfect Week" and "Last Forever – Part 2"; in both episodes, Barney imagines being interviewed by him. In "Perfect Week", his appearance was complimented by Donna Bowman from The A.V. Club.
- Frank Viola phones Marshall, who is unable to speak to him because of a jinx, in "The Final Page – Part 1".
- Nick Swisher, a former New York Yankee, walks into MacLaren's during "Perfect Week". This attracts the attention of the girl Barney was trying to pick up. His appearance on the show was first announced in December 2009; his episode aired in February 2010.
- Funk musician George Clinton appears in "Where Were We?", in a scene imagined by Marshall. Robin Pierson said Clinton's scene was "pure silliness" and Marshall's imaginings were "just a stupid excuse to give Clinton a part on the show".
- Game show host Bob Barker appears in "Showdown", hosting The Price is Right in which Barney competes. Barney claims Bob Barker is his father, a lie told by his mother. Staci Krause said "Barney's emotional closing words to Bob Barker almost brought tears to [her] eyes". Pierson said "the writers handled [Barney's storyline] beautifully".
- Tim Gunn appears in 5 episodes from "Girls Versus Suits" to "The End of the Aisle". First appearing in the 100th episode of the show, he is Barney's tailor and in season 9, goes to Farhampton during Barney's wedding weekend. Tim Gunn designs Barney's wedding tux; they play poker together in "The Poker Game" and in "Sunrise", a drunk Barney takes Justin and Kyle to Tim Gunn to be fitted for suits. Brian Zoromski said Gunn "seemed a little bit stilted in his delivery"; however, Hannigan said he was "more popular than Britney Spears" and that she "[wanted] him back in every episode". He was third in a list of best guest stars in the show by Bustle.
- Alex Trebek appears in "False Positive" and "P.S. I Love You". In the former, a Christmas special, he hosts the fictional game show Million Dollar Heads or Tails; it was announced Trebek would appear in the show on December 13 by TV Guide on November 17, 2014. Later, Trebek appeared alongside a number of Canadian guest stars in "P.S. I Love You" in an episode centered around "Robin Sparkles".
- Alan Thicke appears in 5 episodes from "Sandcastles in the Sand" to "The Rehearsal Dinner". In the Robin Sparkles music video "Sandcastles in the Sand," he was cast as Sparkles' dad. In "The Rough Patch", he was hired by Lily to help with a plan to break Robin and Barney up; one critic said about the episode "anything Alan Thicke-related was funny" while another said the highlight of the episode was Thicke telling Barney that he and Robin once worked together on a Canadian variety show. It was revealed in "Glitter" that Thicke worked with Robin and Jessica Glitter in the variety show "Space Teens". Thicke appeared in "P.S. I Love You", where he beats Barney easily in a fight, after Barney mistakenly thinks Robin had a crush on Thicke as a teenager. Thicke's final appearance on the show was in "The Rehearsal Dinner", where he sings a Crash Test Dummies song. However, Thicke also appeared on a website made specifically for the show, CanadianSexActs.org, featured in the episode "Old King Clancy".
- Jason Priestley, Paul Shaffer, Geddy Lee, Dave Coulier, k.d. lang, Luc Robitaille and Steven Page appear in a fictional documentary during "P.S. I Love You"; it was announced these Canadian guest stars would appear in a Robin Sparkles–related episode on January 7, 2013, roughly a month before the episode aired.

As characters

Abby
Played by Britney Spears; appears in "Ten Sessions" and "Everything Must Go". Abby is Stella's receptionist. Very energetic and scatterbrained, she developed an obsessive crush on Ted while he was pursuing Stella. Barney ended up sleeping with her. It was announced Spears would appear on the show in March 2008; most critics complimented her acting in "Ten Sessions", with Segel noting that she improvised a few "really good" lines. However, her scenes in "Everything Must Go" were described as "rushed and awkward", and her character as "silly". An article in Bustle ranked her top in a list of guest stars on How I Met Your Mother.
Amy
Played by Mandy Moore; appears in "Wait for It". A girl who Ted meets at MacLaren's shortly after breaking up with Robin. After committing theft and trespassing in someone else's home, she takes an intoxicated Ted to get a tattoo, a butterfly on his lower back which his friends call a "tramp stamp". She was described by IGN as "fantastic in her brief role"; Joel Keller of TV Squad originally said Moore "doesn't pull [her hard-ass role] off", although later said that she was not too bad. Moore described her kiss with Radnor as "unbelievably awkward", although Radnor said "she was a really good fake kisser".
Anita Appleby
Played by Jennifer Lopez; appears in "Of Course". Anita has written a book about dating, encouraging women to "train" men and refrain from sex until they have had seventeen dates with a person; after being interviewed by Robin on the news, Robin hires her to seduce Barney.
Gael
Played by: Enrique Iglesias, the guy Robin appears with when returning from Argentina after the breakup with Ted. He appears in the first two episodes of the third season, "Wait for It" and "We're Not from Here".
Genevieve Scherbatsky
Played by Tracey Ullman, Robin's mother appears in three episodes of season 9 from "Vesuvius" to "The End of the Aisle". She is Robin's mother, but the gang know very little about her until she is finally seen in season 9. Nicholson described her scene in "Vesuvius" as "an appearance that fans have been waiting to see since the season began".
Honey
Played by Katy Perry; appears in "Oh Honey". She is Zoey van Smoot's cousin, the gullible character who Barney eventually sleeps with. As Future Ted cannot recall her real name, she is referred to as "Honey". Perry's appearance was described as a "gimmick", but still praised.
Jessica Glitter
Played by Nicole Scherzinger; appears in "Glitter". She plays an old friend of Robin's from Canada. Glitter was her character's name on a Canadian TV show called "Space Teens" where she and Robin used math to complete missions in space.
Tiffany
Played by Carrie Underwood; appears in "Hooked". Ted is said to be "on the hook" for this girl: he is infatuated with her while she is just friends with him. Brian Zoromski of The A.V. Club described her acting as "decent", especially for a "singer turned actor".

== Other characters ==
"Blah Blah" / Carol
Played by Abigail Spencer; appears in "How I Met Everyone Else" and "Gary Blauman". She meets Ted on World of Warcraft and when she is introduced to the gang, they spend the night wondering whether she is crazy. Ted calls her "blah blah" upon recounting the story to his children in "How I Met Everyone Else", as he cannot remember the girl's actual name; this joke was called "ridiculously funny" by one critic. She appears again in "Gary Blauman", where Ted suddenly remembers that her name was Carol.
Mrs. Buckminster
Played by Jane Carr; appears in "Nannies". She is a "delightful" nanny but Marshall and Lily cannot afford her salary. Barney tries to pay, but Lily realises she feels uncomfortable leaving Marvin with a stranger.
Carly Whittaker
Played by Ashley Benson; appears in "Ring Up!". She is Barney's half-sister, whom Ted briefly dates.
Cathy
Played by Lindsay Price; appears in "Spoiler Alert". Ted is happy dating Cathy until his friends point out that she never stops talking. Once Ted realises this, it starts to annoy him and they eventually break up.
Cindy
Played by Rachel Bilson; appears in 4 episodes from "Girls Versus Suits" to "How Your Mother Met Me". She is a PhD candidate who dates Ted. Her roommate turns out to be The Mother. Cindy turns out to be a lesbian and marries Casey. Cindy, who first appears in the show's 100th episode, "is very important to the ultimate story" according to Bays.
Coat-Check Girl
Played by Jayma Mays; appears in "Okay Awesome" and "The Time Travelers". Ted meets this girl at a dance club, but never calls her. Several years later, he imagines her dropping by at MacLaren's, with two hypothetical future versions warning him that a relationship with her would end after she or Ted became sick of the other.
Darren
Played by Andrew Rannells; appears in "Bass Player Wanted" and "How Your Mother Met Me". Tracy invited him to join her band, and he quickly began to take over it, culminating in him firing Tracy. Darren tries to ruin friendships between Ted and Barney, and Lily and Robin; one critic said "his shit-starting added an edge to everybody's dynamic."
Daryl
Played by Seth Green in "The Final Page – Part 1". A friend from their college days, Daryl became obsessed with Lily and Marshall. He runs a business selling Hacky Sacks whose success he attributes to his friendship with Lily and Marshall. After they tell him that they were not really friends, Daryl calmly accepts it (although Lily and Marshall lose out on a cut of the business's profits as a gift). Max Nicholson said "Daryl's "Hackmigos" bit was a little bizarre, but funny."
Doug Martin
Played by Will Sasso, Doug is an angry, violent bartender who beats up three men for sitting in the gang's booth. Although he appears in the background of several significant events in "The Fight", he is not in the original scenes. He originally wore an unconvincing toupee, with his decision to stop only making him more terrifying.
Garrison Cootes
Played by Martin Short; appears in 3 episodes from "The Naked Truth" to "The Burning Beekeeper". He is Marshall's "workaholic boss" and an "environmental pixie" at the Natural Resources Defense Council. It was announced that Short would appear on the show playing Marshall's boss in June 2011.
Hammond Druthers
Played by Bryan Cranston; appears in 3 episodes from "Aldrin Justice" to "Platonish". Druthers is a condescending architect who is Ted's boss at their architecture firm. Druthers designs a building in Spokane, Washington that, according to Ted and Lily, looks like an erect penis; their client accepts Ted's design instead. Druthers is then forced to work under Ted but continues to undermine him. Druthers is fired by Ted (at the instance of their boss) whilst his life is otherwise going downhill. It was announced in 2013 that Cranston would return to the show. In the ninth season (during "Platonish"), Druthers offers Ted a new job but Ted declines.
Janice Aldrin
Played by Meagen Fay; appears in 3 episodes from "Bachelor Party" to "The Sexless Innkeeper". Janice is Lily's mother, who divorced Lily's father (Mickey) in 1985. She and Lily do not have a good relationship.
Jen
Played by Lindsay Sloane; appears in "Double Date". Ted and Jen are set up on a blind date in 2002 and again in 2009.
Jefferson Coatsworth
Played by John Cho; appears in "I'm Not That Guy". He interviews Marshall for the Nicholson, Hewitt & West law firm.
Jenkins
Played by Amanda Peet; appears in "Jenkins". Jenkins is a lawyer at Goliath National Bank. She kisses Marshall when drunk and is attacked by Lily when she finds out.
Jerome Whittaker
Played by John Lithgow; appears in 4 episodes from "Legendaddy" to "The End of the Aisle". Barney begins to wonder who his real father is after James meets his own biological father in "Cleaning House". Though Barney refuses Loretta's initial offer to reveal his father, he discovers in "Natural History" that it is Jerome, although Barney was told as a child that Jerome was his uncle. Barney is disappointed that Jerome is a "lame suburban dad". Jerome has a wife named Cheryl and two children: J.J. (Jerome Junior) and Carly.
Kara
Played by Aisha Kabia; appears in "Ted Mosby: Architect" and "World's Greatest Couple". Marshall's friend from law school and Brad's old girlfriend.
Karen
Played by Laura Prepon; appears in 3 episodes from "Sorry, Bro" to "Say Cheese", as well as being mentioned in several others. Ted's first real girlfriend, Karen is depicted as highly sarcastic and snooty, which results in Marshall and Lily loathing her. The feeling is mutual, as Karen also has a low opinion of Ted's friends. Karen enjoys berets, Bordeaux wine and Baudelaire's erotic poetry. While Ted is deeply in love with her, Karen cheats on him every time she wants to break up. After Ted discovered that Lily had, as with every other one of his bad relationship, engineered his and Karen's break-up, and that this practice unintentionally led to his and Robin's break-up, he sincerely dumps Karen when she insists that he break off all contact with Lily and Marshall. Karen is often described by critics as "Ted's worst girlfriend".
Katie Scherbatsky
Played by Lucy Hale; appears in "First Time in New York" and "Vesuvius". Katie visits Robin (her sister) in New York and Robin reacts badly when she discovers Katie is planning to lose her virginity to a boy named Kyle. Bustle ranked her second in a list of best guest stars in the series.
Klaus
Played by Thomas Lennon; appears in "Farhampton" and "The Pre-Nup". Klaus is Victoria's fiancé. They were classmates at Victoria's culinary fellowship in Germany but enter a relationship roughly a day after Ted and Victoria break up. He appears on-screen in "Farhampton" as Victoria's groom, but both of them get cold feet at their wedding. The failure of the wedding sends Klaus into a spiral and he briefly stays at Ted's apartment.
Professor Lewis
Played by Jane Seymour; appears in "Aldrin Justice". Professor Lewis is Marshall's recently divorced law professor who is considered a "cougar" by Barney. He has sex with her several times.
Liddy Gates
Played by Mircea Monroe; appears in "Romeward Bound". She is Barney and Robin's wedding planner, and has a "ridonkulous" body according to Ted and Barney.
Mary
Played by Erinn Bartlett; appears in "Mary the Paralegal". Although she is a paralegal, Barney tells Ted she is a prostitute. After initially refusing, Ted tries to have sex with Mary but when he calls her a prostitute she slaps him.
Maggie Wilks
Played by JoAnna Garcia; appears in "The Window". She is described by Ted as so perfect that every person that meets her falls in love with her. Ted tries three times to start a relationship with her, between her long-term relationships with other men, but fails each time as when he arrives she is already dating another man.
Marissa Heller
Played by Darby Stanchfield; appears in "Robots Versus Wrestlers". She used to live in Ted and Marshall's apartment and they occasionally receive mail supposed to go to her.
Mrs. Matsen
Played by Renée Taylor; appears in 3 episodes from "As Fast as She Can" to "The Magician's Code – Part 2". She is Ted's neighbor and helps Marshall reunite Ted and Zoe in "Oh Honey".
Max
Played by Geoff Stults; appears in "Subway Wars" and "Architect of Destruction". He dated Robin briefly.
'Crazy' Meg
Played by April Bowlby; appears in 4 episodes from "Dowisetrepla" to "Slapsgiving 3: Slappointment in Slapmarra". A girl who appears obsessed with commitment, Meg initially hooks up with Barney in an apartment that Marshall and Lily later buy, but was arrested for trespassing when Barney leaves her there. In "The Rough Patch", she is part of Lily's plan to break up Robin and Barney, with whom she is still obsessed.
Naomi the 'Slutty Pumpkin'
Played by Katie Holmes; appears in "The Slutty Pumpkin Returns", after being the subject of "Slutty Pumpkin". After meeting her at a Halloween party ten years earlier, Ted believed that they were very compatible but lost the candy bar where she had written her phone number. For years, Ted wore the same costume and attended the same party in hopes of running into her again. By chance, he finally finds her costume and tracks her down, but finds that they are not as well-matched as they believed. They break up.
Nate "Scooby" Scooberman
Played by Robbie Amell; appears in "A Change of Heart" and "The Exploding Meatball Sub". Robin finds this enthusiastic guy in the park and is slow to realize his dog-like qualities.
Nora Zinman
Played by Danneel Ackles; appears in "Shelter Island". Nora is Stella's sister. After her fiancé ran off, Stella offered to take over her sister's wedding with Ted.
Penelope
Played by Amy Acker; appears in "Come On". A girl who hooked up with Barney twice, Penelope tries to teach Ted how to do a rain dance.
PJ
Played by Ryan Sypek; appears in "Mosbius Designs". For a brief time, he is Ted's office assistant and dates Robin.
Punchy
Played by Chris Romano; appears in 4 episodes from "Sandcastles in the Sand" to "The Best Man". Adam "Punchy" Punciarello is Ted's high school buddy. Ted experiences "revertigo" when he is around Punchy: he acts the way he was in high school. The gang attends Punchy's wedding in "The Best Man".
Randy Wharmpess
Played by Will Forte; appears in "Rebound Bro" and "Canning Randy". An employee of Goliath National Bank's legal department, Randy worships Barney. Randy's ineffectiveness results in his sacking, but is rehired as Marshall feels guilty. Randy then resorts to destroying Marshall's office to get fired again, wanting a severance package so he can establish a new microbrewery for his signature beer.
Rhonda French
Played by Stephanie Faracy; appears in "The Yips". A friend of Loretta Stinson, Rhonda is known as the "man-maker" as she has made many men lose their virginity, including Barney.
Sam Gibbs
Played by Ben Vereen; appears in 4 episodes from "Cleaning House" to "The End of the Aisle". He is James Stinson's father, who was absent from his childhood as Loretta did not want him around. James meets him at the age of 37. Sam officiates at Barney and Robin's wedding.
Sarah O'Brien
Played by Beth Lacke; appears in "Matchmaker". She is an engaged dermatologist deemed to be extremely compatible with Ted by Love Solutions, a dating service.
Sascha
Played by Carla Toutz; appears in "Sweet Taste of Liberty". An airport security officer, Sascha invites Barney and Ted back to her house for an incredibly disappointing "party".
Shelly
Played by Eva Amurri; appears in "The Playbook" and "Slapsgiving 3: Slappointment in Slapmarra". Shelly is a teacher who works at Lily's school. After she sees Ted stuffing himself with chicken wings, Lily waits three years before trying to fix them up again. However, Barney sleeps with her before Ted can meet her.
Simon Tremblay
Played by James Van Der Beek; appears in 3 episodes from "Sandcastles in the Sand" to "Bedtime Stories". Robin's Canadian ex-boyfriend, who broke up with her to date Louise Marsh. Years later, he visits Robin in New York and they briefly date; he breaks up with her a second time, again to date Louise Marsh. He later becomes engaged to Louise and Robin steals and eats his wedding cake.
Dr. Sonya
Played by Vicki Lewis; appears in three episodes from "The Stinson Missile Crisis" to "The Magician's Code – Part One". She is Lily's doctor and helps her give birth to Marvin, as well as being the doctor who tells Robin she is infertile.
Stacy Gusar
Played by Janet Varney; appears in "Little Boys". Barney and Ted try to sleep with her in order to determine who has the most "game".
Steve Biel
Played by Kevin Heffernan; appears in "I'm Not That Guy". He is a porn star who performs under the name "Ted Mosby".
Steve 'Blitz' Henry
Played by Jorge Garcia; appears in "Blitzgiving" and "Gary Blauman". He is a college friend of Ted and Marshall, who gets his nickname from the curse he has: amazing events occur whenever he leaves. He passes the curse on to several other characters, including Barney and Ted, before the curse gets passed back to him. He makes numerous allusions to Jorge Garcia's Lost character.
Tom
Played by Jai Rodriguez; appears in "The Rebound Girl" and "Gary Blauman". Tom marries James Stinson and they adopt two children, Eli and Sadie. James cheats on Tom and they almost get divorced.
Lucy Zinman
Played by Darcy Rose Byrnes. Daughter of Stella and Tony, she is often seen happily around Ted and her parents. Appears in 5 episodes from "Rebound Bro" to "Happily Ever After"
Tony Grafanello
Played by Jason Jones; appears in three episodes from "Shelter Island" to "As Fast as She Can". He dated Stella and they have a child together. Stella leaves Ted at the altar and gets back together with Tony. Feeling guilty for "stealing" Stella, Tony gets Ted a college teaching position. Subsequently, Tony made a movie about their love triangle called The Wedding Bride, and two sequels were later released. Ted is infuriated by his Roman à clef character of Jed Mosley, a stereotypical, over-the top antagonist, and the depiction of his romantic gestures as selfish and sexist. His friends find it hilarious and, at times, quite accurate, becoming fans of the franchise; however Marshall is later outraged by the character of Narshall, an oafish sidekick to Mosley.
Trudy
Played by Danica McKellar; appears in "The Pineapple Incident" and "Third Wheel". She ends up in Ted's bed after he gets really drunk. In a later episode, Ted tries to have a threesome with her and another girl, although it is never said whether he did or not.
Professor Vinick
Played by Peter Gallagher; appears in "The Final Page – Part 1". He told Ted he'd never make it as an architect, damaging Ted's self-esteem and causing him to bear a grudge.
