= Rebound Bro =

- How I Met Your Mother episode
- Episode no.: Season 3 Episode 18
- Directed by: Pamela Fryman
- Written by: Jamie Rhonheimer
- Production code: 3ALH18
- Original air date: May 5, 2008

Guest appearances
- Sarah Chalke as Stella; Will Forte as Randy

Episode chronology
← Previous "The Goat"	Next → "Everything Must Go"
- How I Met Your Mother season 3

"Rebound Bro" is the 18th episode of the third season of the television series How I Met Your Mother and 62nd overall. It originally aired on May 5, 2008.

== Plot ==
When Ted rejects Barney's attempts to reconcile with him, Robin is confused as to why he is more mad at Barney than her for their one-night stand. Lily reasons that it is because Ted is more focused on his relationship with Stella. After two months, Ted wants to take things to the next level, but she is reluctant and tells Ted a secret: she has not had sex in five years.

When Stella comes over on the night that she is meant to have sex with Ted, Marshall and Lily accidentally reveal they know her secret. Stella is upset that Ted betrayed her trust and says she cannot trust him. When Ted asks Stella if she is looking for a reason not to sleep with him and whether it scares her that things between them are getting serious, Stella storms off without answering.

Stella comes back to Ted's apartment and admits that Ted is right: she was looking for a reason not to get too close, but has realized that she is ready to take the next step with him. Ted and Stella's relationship goes even further than expected as Ted meets Stella's daughter and gets to know her. Stella tells Ted that her sister is still in town and can take care of Stella's daughter. Stella and Ted rush to a motel, where they consummate their relationship. When Ted jokingly picks up the phone to tell Marshall and Lily about it after the deed is done, Stella pushes him off the bed in a lighthearted manner.

Barney tries to find a "rebound bro" to whom he can be a wingman to help him get casual sex with women. He puts applications up on his blog and receives few responses except for an enthusiastic proposal from his colleague Randy. After unsuccessfully resorting to calling up old friends and previous wingmen, he decides to be the "bro" to Randy and give him a chance. Randy has not had sex in thirteen years and Barney is repeatedly unsuccessful at getting him together with a woman, since Randy is uncomfortable with talking to women, and gets nosebleeds whenever he gets an erection. Barney then enlists Robin's help to make Randy comfortable with small talk with women, telling Robin that he may have a sex tape with her to convince her. After another bad attempt, Robin points out that Barney is trying to fill the void left behind by Ted by rushing into wingmanship with Randy as a rebound bro. Barney agrees and tells Randy it is not working out, but when Randy admits he was a police officer, but was fired for incompetence, Barney, knowing being in the "force" impresses women, finds a woman who takes Randy home with her. However, he gets emotional when Robin tells him that Ted does not know what he is missing.

== Critical response ==
Donna Bowman of The A.V. Club rated the episode A−.
