= Nannies (How I Met Your Mother) =

- How I Met Your Mother episode
- Episode no.: Season 8 Episode 3
- Directed by: Pamela Fryman
- Written by: Chuck Tatham
- Original air date: October 8, 2012

Guest appearances
- Chris Elliott as Mickey Aldrin; Kim Shaw as Julie Jorgenson; Jane Carr as Mrs. Buckminster; Ashley Williams as Victoria; Michael Trucco as Nick

Episode chronology
← Previous "The Pre-Nup"	Next → "Who Wants to Be a Godparent?"
- How I Met Your Mother season 8

"Nannies" is the third episode of the eighth season of the CBS sitcom How I Met Your Mother, and the 163rd episode overall.

== Plot ==
With Marshall and Lily's parental leave about to expire, the two scramble to find a nanny to take care of baby Marvin, while Barney goes back to his womanizing ways to get over his recent breakup with Quinn, organizing a festival called "Bangtoberfest" to pick up women. Lily's father, Mickey, who has moved in temporarily with the family after his house was destroyed by a fire (the incident was featured in Robin's newscast), makes repeated offers to care for Marvin, which Lily refuses, partly due to her childhood issues with him. Robin offers to babysit Marvin with Nick, and she and Ted wind up arguing about whose relationship is better: Robin with Nick or Ted with Victoria. Both attempt to outdo the other by pointing out benefits in their own relationships.

In Marshall and Lily's search for a nanny, an elderly British woman named Mrs. Buckminster quickly emerges as the leading candidate, until they realize that they cannot afford her salary demands. After fruitless searches over a nanny agency's website, the second favorite nanny who comes from the same town as Marshall seems like a perfect match, but after her last interview of the day tells them that she will not be becoming a nanny because she met a rich man. Lily and Marshall immediately realize it was Barney, but when they meet her at his apartment, she refuses to be a nanny for people who are friends with such a person. Barney then explains he only used her as part of a plan to pick up women: he added children's toys to his apartment and used the same nanny hire website Lily used so he could try to seduce young women under the guise of a widower seeking a nanny for his child. Furious at Barney, they leave. Mrs. Buckminster returns to them later, stating that Barney paid her salary in remorse for chasing off their nanny. All seems well until Lily's anxiety at leaving Marvin with a stranger gets the better of her. She irrationally decides to fire Mrs. Buckminster on the spot, despite Marshall's attempts to calm her down.

When Ted and Robin's bragging drags on, both of them are forced to admit that there is something wrong with their relationships, with Ted seeing that Nick is too emotional after watching him cry during a game, and Robin pointing out that Victoria is a slob after seeing her make a mess of Ted's apartment. This culminates in a period of sadness now that both Ted and Robin are amplifying the flaws of their partners that each of them did not see before. However, Barney arrives looking disheveled and cries about many of the nannies ganging up on him and beating him up earlier that day – all because he cannot stop himself from his womanizing ways after he split from Quinn, no matter how hard he tries. After hearing this, and with some pity for Barney, both Ted and Robin decide they should appreciate the flaws in their relationships, as this helps them grow in them. Future Ted later states that both relationships would "implode within the month".

When Lily falls asleep with Marvin, she and Marshall are horrified to discover their son missing when she wakes up. They think Mrs. Buckminster stole the child while Lily was asleep until they learn that Mickey took care of Marvin's needs for the whole day and even brought him to the park for a stroll. He also tells Lily that as the house burned, he went back inside to recover an old photo album showing him taking care of Lily as a baby right up to her first day at preschool. Lily and Marshall happily let Mickey take care of Marvin. A collection of pictures shows that Mickey turned out well as a grandfather, even joining Lily in seeing Marvin off on his first day at preschool.

As Barney sulks over his fate and tries to seduce women again, Mrs. Buckminster wards them off and later sleeps with him.

== Critical reception ==
The A.V. Club's Donna Bowman described Barney's response to breaking up with Quinn as "wacky and unrealistic", Lily and Marshall's trouble finding a nanny as "cliche and predictable", and their combination as "an unpromising brew of sitcom business as usual". She described the secondary plot, involving Ted and Robin as "fresh and vibrant". Overall, she graded the episode B−.

Max Nicholson at IGN gave the episode 5.4/10 (mediocre) and said that the episode "had its brief flashes of potential, but right now those classic moments are still a distant memory."

Television Without Pity's Ethan Alter gave the episode a D. He writes that at the end of the episode "nobody [wins], especially those of us watching at home" and describes the series as "increasingly terrible."
