= The Pre-Nup =

- How I Met Your Mother episode
- Episode no.: Season 8 Episode 2
- Directed by: Pamela Fryman
- Written by: Carter Bays; Craig Thomas
- Original air date: October 1, 2012

Guest appearances
- Becki Newton as Quinn; Ashley Williams as Victoria; Michael Trucco as Nick; Thomas Lennon as Klaus; Bob Odenkirk as Arthur Hobbs; Suzie Plakson as Judy Eriksen; Bill Fagerbakke as Marvin Eriksen Sr.

Episode chronology
← Previous "Farhampton"	Next → "Nannies"
- How I Met Your Mother season 8

"The Pre-Nup" is the second episode of the eighth season of the CBS sitcom How I Met Your Mother, and the 162nd episode overall.

The episode narrates Ted Mosby's problems with his current girlfriend, Victoria, and it focuses on the downfall and eventual breakup of Barney and Quinn. It gathered 8.17 million viewers, but it was panned by critics.

== Plot ==
Future Ted tells his children that the summer of 2012 was uneventful because everyone was happy and in love, so he skips ahead to October. Barney is scared by his boss Arthur Hobbs into designing a prenuptial agreement for his and Quinn's upcoming wedding because his marriage could fail and leave him with nothing, just like Hobbs' own failure to get a pre-nup resulted in him losing everything in their divorce. The conditions in the detailed and complex pre-nup are unreasonable; Quinn angrily tells Lily, Robin, and Victoria, who all agree with her.

When Barney tells the story to Marshall, Ted, and Nick, they all consider how there are things in their relationships they would like to change. Marshall is upset that Lily will not let him play with baby Marvin as he wishes, Nick is annoyed by how Robin wants to watch television as they have sex (unaware that she is aroused from watching herself on the news), and Ted is having second thoughts about letting Victoria's ex-fiancé Klaus stay with them as he tries to get back on his feet. That night, all the couples talk about the pre-nup, and Future Ted reveals that all of the couples except Lily and Marshall would break up by the end of the season and that one would break up the following day.

After complaining to each other about their other half's frustrations, Quinn and the girls confront Barney with an equally unreasonable pre-nup. Barney calls up the other guys and the meeting turns into a huge argument between all the couples. Hobbs convinces everyone to stop fighting and reveal what has been bothering them in their relationships. All the couples manage to resolve their differences, except Barney and Quinn. Despite their attempt to get rid of their pre-nups, they realize that getting married should not be so hard but find they cannot trust each other, so they break up.

At MacLaren's, Barney tells Marshall and Ted that he is better off not getting married and that his single life will always be "legendary". However, in a flash-forward, he announces his wedding will be "legendary" to his co-workers. When Hobbs asks if he needs a pre-nup, Barney tells him he will not need it this time as Robin arrives and they leave GNB together.

== Music ==
- "Hey Beautiful" – The Solids
- "Museum of Flight" – Damien Jurado (uncredited)

== Critical reception ==
The A.V. Club's Donna Bowman wrote that, "While HIMYM can sometimes take hackneyed plots and give them fresh twists, that didn't happen here," because ", the episode proceeds by the numbers." She gave the episode a C.

Max Nicholson at IGN said that, "It was most definitely lackluster in both comedy and all-around enjoyable content." He gave the episode a score of 5.2/10 (mediocre).

Television Without Pity's Angel Cohn graded the episode a C− writing that it, "Was annoying and nearly completely useless, save for the fact that it explained how/why Barney and Quinn split up."
