= Gary Blauman =

- How I Met Your Mother episode
- Episode no.: Season 9 Episode 21
- Directed by: Pamela Fryman
- Written by: Kourtney Kang
- Original air date: March 17, 2014

Guest appearances
- Taran Killam as Gary Blauman; Ellen D. Williams as Patrice; Emily Chang as Steph; Jennifer Morrison as Zoey Pierson; Wayne Brady as James Stinson; Lou Ferrigno, Jr. as Louis; Marshall Manesh as Ranjit; Joe Nieves as Carl The Bartender; Kal Penn as Kevin; Alexis Denisof as Sandy Rivers; Jorge Garcia as Steve "The Blitz" Henry; Jai Rodriguez as Tom; Billy Zabka as himself; Abby Elliott as Jeanette Peterson; David Burtka as Scooter; Abigail Spencer as Blahblah / Carol

Episode chronology
← Previous "Daisy"	Next → "The End of the Aisle"
- How I Met Your Mother season 9

"Gary Blauman" is the 21st episode of the ninth season of the CBS sitcom How I Met Your Mother, and the 205th episode overall. It follows future Ted Mosby as he explains to The Mother why going somewhere without a reservation is not easy, through the story of Gary Blauman, as they ditch the restaurant they wanted to go to earlier and choose to go someplace where they do not really need a reservation.

== Plot ==
Ted and the Mother are going out to dinner on their first date at 8 p.m. on Wednesday, three days after Barney and Robin's wedding. When they decide not to go to the restaurant they originally chose, the Mother says they should just find a restaurant where they do not need a reservation. Ted tells her that going somewhere without a reservation is not easy, through the story of Gary Blauman.

Three days earlier, Blauman shows up two hours before the wedding and congratulates Robin, who panics when she realizes that she did not plan a seat for him. Marshall tries to change the wedding seating plan, but finds it difficult and recruits Ted's help. Ted refuses, having hated Blauman ever since they competed for a girl once at a party. Lily advocates for Blauman, grateful for him stopping her from getting a huge tattoo on her back following her and Marshall's breakup.

Barney does not want Blauman there either, as Blauman once stole four of Barney's fries at MacLaren's, including the accidental curly. Billy Zabka and James come in; Zabka wants him there, because Blauman appreciates his poetry, but James does not, as his affair with Blauman caused his husband Tom to leave him. Upon hearing this, Ted changes his mind, realizing that Blauman is gay and that he actually wanted to woo Ted at the party.

Marshall ultimately makes the tie-breaking vote: Blauman stays because Robin wants him to, as she is the bride and has final say over any decision. Barney then admits that he already told Blauman to leave. The gang finds Blauman as he is about to drive away, leading Ted to realize that he must hold on to the people that matter most to him, as they could instantly disappear from his life. Future Ted reveals the fates of many acquaintances he and his friends had met in his stories, and adds that James and Tom eventually got back together. Blauman returns and apologizes, agreeing to attend the wedding.

While Ted is telling the story, The Mother stops him momentarily after spotting her ex-boyfriend in the distance. She tells Ted she recently had a bad breakup and is not ready to date, but wants him to finish the story. Later, the Mother cuts off the story again when they reach her building. They exchange goodbyes, but the Mother quickly calls Ted back and asks him to finish the story, much to his relief. After Ted finishes the story, he and the Mother have their first kiss, and decide to walk around the city some more.

== Critical reception ==
Donna Bowman of The A.V. Club graded the episode an A.

Max Nicholson of IGN gave the episode 8.7/10, saying that it "delivered a sharp and enjoyable storyline that felt like a snapshot of the show's former glory."
