= Who Wants to Be a Godparent? =

- How I Met Your Mother episode
- Episode no.: Season 8 Episode 4
- Directed by: Pamela Fryman
- Written by: Matt Kuhn
- Original air date: October 15, 2012

Guest appearances
- Ashley Williams as Victoria; Michael Trucco as Nick

Episode chronology
← Previous "Nannies"	Next → "The Autumn of Break-Ups"
- How I Met Your Mother season 8

"Who Wants to Be a Godparent?" is the fourth episode of the eighth season of the CBS sitcom How I Met Your Mother, and the 164th episode overall. It first aired on October 15, 2012. This episode depicts the characters Lily and Marshall not being able to decide on godparents for Marvin, they put the others to the test to see who would make the best one. The episode received 7.93 million viewers.

== Plot ==
With Mickey now taking care of Marvin, Marshall and Lily finally reunite with the gang at MacLaren's. However, when the two ask Barney, Ted, and Robin about how they are doing, the three simply say everything is great. In reality, they have nothing good to say per Marshall and Lily's previous "eight-or-higher" decree: Victoria tells Ted a joke about him owing her father $70,000 for the wedding, Robin was duped by Nick about riding a motorbike powered by corn, and Barney just slept with another woman who was not an "8 or higher".

After a short drink, Marshall and Lily leave to spend some time together on the street. However, a close brush with a taxicab forces them to consider preparing a last will and testament, designating a guardian for Marvin in case either or both of them die (which saddens Lily at the mere mention of the word). The two argue over possibly designating Marshall's mother Judy, his elder brother Marcus (who left his family despite being a good father), or Lily's parents as the guardian.

Ted, Barney, and Robin volunteer to be Marvin's guardian. Marshall and Lily hold a game show in the apartment called "Who Wants to Be a Godparent?". The objective is to determine who of the three is suitable to be Marvin's godparent. As Ted, Barney, and Robin make trite answers to various questions on a game wheel, Marshall and Lily get angry at them for not appreciating how hard it is to be a parent. The three respond by expressing frustration at the couple for being apathetic to their personal problems. The group reconciles by dropping the "eight-or-higher" rule and hang out at the bar once more. The next morning, Ted, Robin, and Barney wake up at the apartment and Robin and Ted step up to help take care of Marvin so Lily and Marshall can go back to sleep while Barney leaves the apartment. The two decide to list all three of them as their son's legal guardians.

== Critical reception ==
The A.V. Club's Donna Bowman graded the episode a C, calling the main plot "limping" and "almost apologetic". Overall she calls the episode "passable, but not what we should be expecting from a show that's set itself much higher standards of creativity."

Max Nicholson at IGN gave the episode 4.3/10 (Bad) and said that "If a TV show had multiple sharks to jump, HIMYM's "Who Wants to Be a Godparent?" would have been one of them."

Television Without Pity's Ethan Alter gave the episode a D−. He describes the game show sequence as "a lengthy, cringe-inducing montage of [Ted, Barney, and Robin] acting like maroons."
