= Bedtime Stories (How I Met Your Mother) =

- How I Met Your Mother episode
- Episode no.: Season 9 Episode 11
- Directed by: Pamela Fryman
- Written by: Carter Bays; Craig Thomas
- Original air date: November 25, 2013

Guest appearances
- James Van Der Beek as Simon Tremblay; Lin-Manuel Miranda as Gus; Camille Guaty as Lisa

Episode chronology
← Previous "Mom and Dad"	Next → "The Rehearsal Dinner"
- How I Met Your Mother season 9

"Bedtime Stories" is the eleventh episode of the ninth season of the CBS sitcom How I Met Your Mother, and the 195th episode overall.

== Plot ==
On Saturday at 5pm, 25 hours before Barney and Robin's wedding, Marshall and his son, Marvin, are taking the bus in the final leg of their journey to Farhampton. In an effort to get Marvin to sleep, Marshall constantly uses rhymes (the entire episode is worded with rhymes), and begins telling stories of his friends. The intro sequence employs a music box version of the theme song. The episode also features Lin-Manuel Miranda as a rhyming and rapping bus passenger named Gus.

=== "Mosby at the Bat" ===
The first story concerns Ted while he was still a professor. Lisa, a young physics professor, introduces herself to Ted and asks him out to dinner to learn more about his inspiring lectures. Ted is at first excited, but then wonders if Lisa will view the dinner as a date or as just a meeting between coworkers. Throughout the dinner, Ted receives mixed signals on whether it is a date or not, and Lisa eventually reveals she had once dated a New York Yankees player. Ted is so intrigued he urges her to tell who; she reveals him to be Derek Jeter just as she casually describes their meeting as "a lovely date", but when Lisa shows him a picture, Ted is annoyed to find out it is actually Barney.

=== "Robin Takes the Cake" ===
The next story begins with Robin having recently broken up with one of her ex-boyfriends (Marshall is unable to remember who), and is unashamedly shoveling down sweets at a bakery. She then runs into Simon and is surprised to see he is more clean-shaven and professional than before, but quickly becomes dejected when he reveals he's engaged to be married. In anger, Robin steals Simon's wedding cake and begins eating it at Ted's apartment, much to Ted's scolding and bewilderment. When Robin has finished nearly half the cake, Lily arrives, and Robin feels remorse for her actions and decides to stop. Lily, however, convinces Robin to be strong and finish the cake. Her struggle to finish soon draws others to the apartment to cheer her on, including Barney who brings a keg of beer. She eventually finishes, then proceeds to do a keg stand (Marshall adds that afterwards they had to get her stomach pumped).

=== "Barney Stinson, Player King of New York City" ===
The final story has the gang at McLaren's, where Barney has his sights set on a girl who just walked into the bar. Lily says the girl is out of Barney's league, but Barney claims no girl is unworthy as he is the "Player King of New York City". Barney relates a story of how, after bedding Lisa, he was called before the High Council of Players, a group of pickup artists of differing social backgrounds each with a specific borough of New York City in which they can seduce women (the members are all played by Neil Patrick Harris): hipster Pickle Jar Bob in Brooklyn, guido Staten Island Lou in Staten Island, airline pilot impersonator Captain Bill in Queens, New York Yankee impersonator Bronx Donnie in the Bronx, and upper class Tuxedo Charlie with whom Barney shares Manhattan, using Fifth Avenue as the boundary; Charlie gets the eastern side, Barney the western side. Because Lisa lives on East 22nd Street and Barney had impersonated Derek Jeter to bed her, Barney must offer Robin and Lily to Charlie and Donnie respectively as recompense for using Donnie's methods in Charlie's territory. Barney agrees, then offers a toast of champagne to everyone. They all drink except Barney, who reveals he had poisoned the drinks, and laughs as the other members die. In the present, the others sarcastically applaud Barney's story, but reveal Ted to be making out with the girl to punish Barney for sleeping with Lisa, leaving Barney annoyed and jealous. The scene is an allusion to a similar meeting scene in The Godfather in which the leaders of the five crime families of New York meet to settle a dispute.

Marshall nearly gets Marvin to sleep when the bus suffers a flat tire, and Marshall and the other riders step outside to view a fireworks display. Marshall tells Marvin he will be with his mother soon, but dreads the impending fallout he would face from Lily finding out about his judgeship. Marshall hopes Marvin is too young to remember the day's events, but Future Ted remarks the fireworks would be the first memory Marvin would remember. Gus, another passenger on the bus, informs Marshall that the Farhampton Inn is only five miles away, and Marshall decides to walk there, a decision Future Ted explains Marshall would later regret.

== Critical reception ==
The A.V. Club's Donna Bowman graded the episode an A−, calling it "a bravura performance, full of gratuitous and therefore adorable ambition, and everybody looks like they’re having a marvelous time pulling it off. But if you don’t like this kind of thing, if it smacks of gimmickry and desperation to you, I doubt I can convince you otherwise."

Max Nicholson of IGN gave the episode 5.5/10, saying it was "a time-killer" that had "a couple somewhat promising stories... marred by a mediocre execution."
