= Third Wheel (How I Met Your Mother) =

- How I Met Your Mother episode
- Episode no.: Season 3 Episode 3
- Directed by: Pamela Fryman
- Written by: David Hemingson
- Production code: 3ALH04
- Original air date: October 8, 2007

Guest appearances
- Busy Philipps as Rachel; Danica McKellar as Trudy; Lyndsy Fonseca as Daughter; David Henrie as Son; Christine Woods as Waitress; Neil Jackson as Ian; Melissa Ordway as Woman #1; Chantelle Barry as Woman #2

Episode chronology
← Previous "We're Not from Here"	Next → "Little Boys"
- How I Met Your Mother season 3

"Third Wheel" is the third episode in the third season of the television series How I Met Your Mother and 47th overall. It originally aired on CBS on October 8, 2007.

== Plot ==
Ted calls Barney from the bathroom of MacLaren's to explain that he is about to "go for the belt", which Barney cannot believe. Half an hour previously, we see Barney and Marshall playing tennis on Nintendo Wii and Ted, 'suited up' and about to leave, tries to get them to come with him. Engrossed in their game, Barney and Marshall say they will follow shortly.

Robin and Lily are also dressed up; Lily explains she got the boots Robin is wearing in a shoe sale "footwear feeding frenzy", but after asking if the boots are a bit high for her dress, Robin explains her new 'no shave' policy, which Barney ridicules.

Ted calls Barney from the bar, but the guys can't make it down due to their tennis tournament. Ted then runs into Trudy from "The Pineapple Incident" and, while chatting, Trudy's competitive sorority sister Rachel appears and joins in.

Ted calls Barney again to explain the situation that's arising and to ask which girl he should go for. Lily takes Barney's phone and tells Ted she will come down to see and let him know, but when she arrives she says that both are giving him the green light. Meanwhile, Robin is on a date with a British surgeon and flirting to comical proportions, but then she calls Lily and tells her to bring a razor, as she is about to break her 'no shave' policy.

Rachel and Trudy insinuate to Ted about their plans for a threesome (or as Ted puts it, "tricycle") and Ted explains to Lily and Marshall about the ongoing competition between himself and Barney for 'the belt', a replica wrestling belt that Barney bought some time ago, which would be awarded to the first one to pull off 'the tricycle'. Marshall is upset he wasn't included in the tricycle competition and tries to convince everyone he could win, while Rachel, Trudy and Ted decide to head up to the apartment.

Robin calls Lily again to ask for a razor but Lily cannot leave the apartment due to Ted's situation, so Robin is forced to pay $50 to a waitress at the restaurant to get her a razor from a nearby pharmacy.

Ted tells Barney, Lily and Marshall that he is bringing the girls upstairs, so they hide in Ted's room. Ted goes to get a CD but runs into the rest of the gang in his room, where Barney attempts to sabotage Ted's plans and insists that the belt is his birth-right.

Barney tells the story of how he almost "rode the tricycle" the year before, but a spilled glass of red wine ruined his chance. As Ted protests about Barney's interference, Lily takes a closer look at the girls and recognises Rachel from the earlier shoe sale incident as the girl who snatched a pair of boots from Lily's grasp.

On Robin's date, the waitress gives Robin a razor but without any shaving cream, and so she is forced to improvise in the bathroom with some butter she takes from her table. She slips and knocks herself out on the bathroom floor, leaving her date waiting outside the restaurant.

As Rachel and Trudy attempt to step things up with Ted, he suffers an attack of nerves and tries to end things abruptly. When he confronts the gang in his bedroom, Barney defends Ted's actions by explaining that this problem is not uncommon and is actually what ended his "tricycle" efforts the previous year: the nerves provoked him to deliberately spill the wine and run out.

Seeing the opportunity Ted has, Barney decides to coach him into winning the belt and tells Ted to open proceedings with a foot massage and then use "the mortality angle", but by the time he leaves the bedroom the girls appear to be gone. When he hears giggling coming from Lily and Marshall's room, Ted peers in then enters with a smile on his face.

Cutting to the next day at the bar, Barney, Ted, Lily and Marshall are discussing the night and Barney demands to know what happened. Ted will not divulge any information (even when physically offered the belt), which annoys Barney.

The final scene recaps events at the restaurant the previous night, where Robin's date asks the waitress to check if Robin is still in the bathroom. Peering in to see Robin sprawled, semi-conscious on the floor, she tells him no one is in there and the window is open. Seizing the moment, the waitress then leaves with Robin's date and Robin finally comes out of the bathroom to try and salvage the night, only to note that her head is bleeding before collapsing again.

== Critical response ==
Donna Bowman of The A.V. Club rated the episode A−.

Staci Krause of IGN gave the episode a rating of 8.3 out of 10. The review also mentions the extended scene that was posted on the official site, which was improvised by the actors after Ted says, "see you on the other side".
