= Daisy (How I Met Your Mother) =

- How I Met Your Mother episode
- Episode no.: Season 9 Episode 20
- Directed by: Pamela Fryman
- Written by: Carter Bays; Craig Thomas
- Original air date: March 10, 2014

Guest appearances
- Tracey Ullman as Genevieve; Billy Zabka as himself; Marshall Manesh as Ranjit; Kyle MacLachlan as The Captain; Chris Elliott as Mickey Aldrin; Suzie Plakson as Judy Eriksen; Laura Bell Bundy as Becky

Episode chronology
← Previous "Vesuvius"	Next → "Gary Blauman"
- How I Met Your Mother season 9

"Daisy" is the twentieth episode of the ninth season of the CBS sitcom How I Met Your Mother, and the 204th episode overall. It was written by Carter Bays and Craig Thomas, directed by Pamela Fryman, and aired on March 10, 2014.

The episode centers around the guys searching for Lily (Alyson Hannigan), who is missing after a fight with her husband Marshall (Jason Segel), as they try to figure out why she changed her mind about going to Italy. At the same time, Robin (Cobie Smulders), who is engaged to marry Barney (Neil Patrick Harris), is worried she is marrying her someone just like her father. This episode contains a deleted scene that reveals the genesis of the pineapple from "The Pineapple Incident," a long-running gag on the show. "Daisy" received mostly positive critical reception.

== Plot ==
Four hours before the wedding, Robin asks her mother how she made it despite a fear of flying. Genevieve says she somehow got over the fear despite panicking on board and accidentally opening the exit door, resulting in her being restrained to her seat by duct tape. Genevieve asks Robin more about Barney and immediately makes comparisons to Robin Sr. Genevieve's various descriptions of Robin Sr. rankle Robin and Lily because the similarities with Barney make Robin think she is about to marry someone like him.

Marshall discusses his upcoming judgeship with Ted, Barney, Ranjit and Billy Zabka. He admits he feels guilty due to Lily's desire to move to Italy and confused at her changing her mind while she was gone. Zabka claims he saw Lily leaving a nearby convenience store in a car owned by the Captain. The men go to the Captain's estate to confront him and discover he is engaged to Robin's old colleague Becky. The Captain insists that nothing happened between him and Lily, who came to use the powder room. When the Captain brings Ted a daisy from the powder room, Ted analyzes Lily's actions over the past several days.

Ted states his theory that Marshall's recent absence prompted Lily to smoke, and that the fight with Marshall made Lily smoke one last cigarette in the Captain's powder room. After deducing that the cigarette butt was in the daisy's vase, Ted searches for it. Instead, he uncovers a positive pregnancy test. A flashback shows what really happened: after getting sick on the train to Farhampton, Lily paid Linus to serve her non-alcoholic drinks because she suspected she might be pregnant, later buying the test kit at the store.

The men return to the Farhampton Inn, where Marshall reconciles with Lily over her pregnancy and tells her they are moving to Italy to let her pursue her dream. Barney is introduced to his soon-to-be mother-in-law, whom he embraces. Noting that Barney is a hugger unlike Robin Sr., Genevieve brings Robin to the balcony and tries to ease her wedding jitters. A year later in Rome, it is revealed that Marshall and Lily's second child is a girl named Daisy.

== Deleted scene ==
A scene cut from this episode explains where the pineapple, one of the show's running gags from "The Pineapple Incident", came from. The scene was released online by BuzzFeed. In the clip, The Captain has a pineapple on his porch, and explains to the gang that he practices the tradition of putting one outside as a "symbol of hospitality". This leads Ted to remember stealing an identical pineapple from The Captain's house in New York when he was very drunk.

== Critical reception ==
Bill Kuchman of Popculturology raised the theory that based on the reveal that Lily and Marshall had a daughter, the ending of Vesuvius could be foreshadowing something happening to Lily, saying, "Maybe Ted isn't broken up in 2024 over the thought of his wife missing the future wedding of his daughter, Penny—maybe Ted is broken up over the thought of Lily missing the future wedding of her daughter, Daisy. ... We won't know for sure what the ending of 'Vesuvius' really meant, but if this theory is right, HIMYM once again outwitted one of the biggest fan theories surrounding the show." Donna Bowman of The A.V. Club graded the episode a B+. Max Nicholson of IGN gave the episode 7.3/10, saying it was saved by an interesting shake-up for Marshall and Lily. Kaitlin Thomas of TV.com said the Marshall and Lily plot did not hit all of the "right emotional beats."
