= Little Boys =

- How I Met Your Mother episode
- Episode no.: Season 3 Episode 4
- Directed by: Rob Greenberg
- Written by: Kourtney Kang
- Cinematography by: Christian La Fountaine
- Production code: 3ALH03
- Original air date: October 15, 2007

Guest appearances
- Brad Rowe as George; Janet Varney as Stacey; Nicholas Roget-King as Doug; Pamela Darling as 4-year-old Katie; Deanna Russo as Brooke

Episode chronology
| ← Previous "Third Wheel" | Next → "How I Met Everyone Else" |
- How I Met Your Mother season 3

"Little Boys" is the fourth episode in the third season of the television series How I Met Your Mother and 48th overall. It originally aired on CBS on October 15, 2007. The episode received middling reviews. The plot centers around Robin dating a man who has a child, which the character claims to despise but comes round to the concept. A central theme is the woes of the dating world, with Ted, Marshall and Barney also participating in various pick-up strategies.

== Plot ==
Lily tells Robin she will set her up on a date with a guy named George. After she lists his good qualities, Ted points out that she has not mentioned his flaw (or as the gang call it, his "but..."), though when pushed, Lily reveals that George has a son in her kindergarten class. Despite Robin's personal dislike of children, she goes on a date with George and ends up meeting his son, Doug.

After some initial hesitance and an argument about how cereal should be served, Robin and Doug actually hit it off. However, when Robin decides to break up with George before Doug becomes attached to her, Lily shows Robin a picture that Doug has drawn of his "new mommy.” Despite Robin claiming otherwise, everyone else believes the woman in the picture is Robin. Lily informs Robin that if she breaks up with George, she must break up with Doug as well and Robin reluctantly agrees.

Robin goes to see Doug and takes advantage of the fact that he has never been dumped before by using "every cliché in the book,” but is interrupted by the arrival of George's new girlfriend, Brooke, whom she realises is actually the woman in Doug's drawing. Lily tries to comfort Robin after her breakup, but cannot believe she was dumped by a six-year-old. Robin claims she is done with kids but Future Ted narrates that she would eventually make her peace with kids and go on to appear in some important works of art – pictures drawn by his kids of themselves with "Aunt Robin".

Meanwhile, Ted ridicules Barney's latest pick-up plan (a story involving snakes and an eye-patch) and the two argue about who has more "game,” while, to his dismay, Marshall is classed as irrelevant. To settle the argument, Ted and Barney select a woman from the bar to see who can sleep with her first. While Ted is distracted Barney makes his move, only to be slapped in the face by the woman. Barney explains this is because he had already slept with her the year before and therefore, has won the bet, but Ted rules otherwise and begins his pick-up attempt and succeeds.

Ted and Stacey, the woman from the bar, have begun dating so he gloats to Barney about winning the bet. However, Barney makes Ted uncomfortable with thoughts that Barney has already been with Stacey and Ted breaks up with Stacey, admitting to Barney and Marshall that he was unable to get past the thought of her and Barney together. Barney reveals that he had not slept with Stacey at all; on the night of the bet, he asked Stacey to slap him to make it appear as though she hated him to set up the entire ruse that they had slept together. As Ted gloated his dates with Stacey, Barney learned various details about Stacey's life so that he could be there for her when she broke up with Ted. However, one month later, he finds himself bored and frustrated for agreeing to Stacey's request to take things slowly since her experience with Ted.

== Critical response ==
Donna Bowman of The A.V. Club rated the episode C−. She complained the episode had a Friends-esque pair of premise and is "executed with a tin ear and slack discipline" a criticism she even reiterated the following week.

Staci Krause of IGN gave the episode 8.5 out of 10.

Omar G of Television Without Pity gave an episode a B rating.
