= I'm Not That Guy =

- How I Met Your Mother episode
- Episode no.: Season 3 Episode 6
- Directed by: Pamela Fryman
- Written by: Jonathan Groff
- Production code: 3ALH07
- Original air date: October 29, 2007

Guest appearances
- John Cho as Jefferson Coatsworth; Kevin Heffernan as Steve Beal / Ted Mosby Porn Star

Episode chronology
← Previous "How I Met Everyone Else"	Next → "Dowisetrepla"
- How I Met Your Mother season 3

"I'm Not That Guy" is the sixth episode in the third season of the television series How I Met Your Mother and fiftieth overall. It originally aired on CBS on October 29, 2007.

== Plot ==
Marshall is thrilled when he is offered his dream job at the Natural Resources Defense Council. However, Lily urges him to keep his interview with the corporate, polluter-defending law firm Nicholson, Hewitt, & West. Marshall is surprised at how young and understanding his interviewer Jefferson Coatsworth (John Cho) is, and agrees to go to dinner with him. Barney asserts that Jefferson is trying to seduce Marshall, but Lily still insists that Marshall should still go to the dinner. While Marshall enjoys his fancy dinner and meets one of NH&W's clients, Patrick Swayze, Robin discovers why Lily wants Marshall to take the high-paying corporate job: Lily has dozens of credit cards and has racked up so much debt from impulse shopping. This upsets Robin, who asks Lily to confess to Marshall.

Although Marshall agrees to take the job, he has moral conflicts about it the next day, and Lily, unwilling to see him suffer from his selling out, eventually urges him to reject NH&W and work at the NRDC, while vowing to Robin to find a way to pay off her debt on her own. Coatsworth takes Marshall to an amusement park, which he assures will be his only client, at which point Marshall decides that he will take the job. He comments that the amusement park is the "least evil place in the world", although Future Ted mentions that the amusement park was later found to be in violation of several safety standards; three people died and an E. coli outbreak was traced back to the park's corndogs.

Barney has discovered a pornographic movie titled Welcome to the Sex Plane featuring a porn star named "Ted Mosby" (Kevin Heffernan). While Ted is at first amused to discover the reason behind strange encounters in his neighborhood, he then becomes uncomfortable and confused upon learning that porn star Ted Mosby is from the same town as Ted: Shaker Heights, Ohio. He and Barney go to an adult video convention to confront "Bizarro Ted", who used his name while idolizing him. They tell him to change his name to Lance Hardwood. Porn star Ted responds by instead making a new movie titled Lance Hardwood: Sex Architect (starring Ted Mosby). Everyone watches the new movie in Ted's apartment until Barney reveals that he allowed it to be filmed in the very same apartment.

== Critical response ==
Donna Bowman of The A.V. Club rated the episode B+.

Staci Krause of IGN gave the episode 8.1 out of 10.
