= How I Met Everyone Else =

- How I Met Your Mother episode
- Episode no.: Season 3 Episode 5
- Directed by: Pamela Fryman
- Written by: Gloria Calderon Kellett
- Original air date: October 22, 2007

Guest appearances
- Abigail Spencer as Blah Blah / Carol; Jolie Jenkins as Alexa

Episode chronology
| ← Previous "Little Boys" | Next → "I'm Not That Guy" |
- How I Met Your Mother season 3

"How I Met Everyone Else" is the fifth episode in the third season of the television series How I Met Your Mother and 49th overall. It originally aired on CBS on October 22, 2007. Gloria Calderon Kellett, the writer of this episode, won a National Council of La Raza ALMA award for Outstanding Writing for a Television Series for this episode on August 17, 2008. It was directed by Pamela Fryman.

== Plot ==
At the bar, Ted introduces the gang to his newest girlfriend, whose name Future Ted cannot remember and instead refers to as "Blah Blah". Embarrassed that she and Ted met online, she makes up a story about how she saw Ted across a crowded room at a cooking class, only for Ted to tell the rest of the group otherwise. It soon becomes clear that she is neurotic and paranoid when she feels threatened by Robin. In order to change the subject, everyone begins to reminisce about how they all met each other: Marshall, Lily and Ted met on their first official day at college; later on Ted met Barney in the bar's bathroom and introduced him to Marshall and Lily the next day.

Throughout the stories, Blah Blah becomes increasingly paranoid, particularly when she learns that Ted and Robin met and dated for a while. When she wishes that she and Ted had a wonderful love at first sight story like Lily and Marshall, Ted reluctantly counters that the story is not as great as it sounds and says that he met Lily at their freshman party, where they drunkenly made out the night before she met Marshall. Lily recounts the event differently, saying Marshall introduced her to him the next day while he was desperately apologizing to his long-distance girlfriend Karen for kissing another girl. When Blah Blah presses for details, Ted takes Lily aside to discuss what happened at the party. Though Lily recalls kissing someone at the party, she cannot remember who the guy was while Ted insists it was him, much to her horror. Marshall mollifies Lily, saying he saw her and Ted make out with different people at the party. Furious at Ted for kissing another woman, Blah Blah storms out after revealing that she met Ted playing World of Warcraft. For the sake of Marshall and Lily's relationship, Ted accepts Marshall's story, though he is secretly unconvinced.

At their college reunion in 2020, Ted is approached by a woman who tells him that she was the one he made out with at the freshman party, proving Marshall was correct.

== Critical response ==
Staci Krause of IGN gave the episode 8.9 out of 10, describing the episode as 'hilarious' whilst noting the lack of progression in the series.

Both Donna Bowman of The A.V. Club and Oma G of Television Without Pity rated the episode with an A.

In a retrospective, Variety named ranked the episode 19th out of its top 20 episodes from the show.
