= Dowisetrepla =

- How I Met Your Mother episode
- Episode no.: Season 3 Episode 7
- Directed by: Pamela Fryman
- Written by: Brenda Hsueh
- Production code: 3ALH06
- Original air date: November 5, 2007

Guest appearances
- April Bowlby as Meg; Phill Lewis as Loan Officer; Maggie Wheeler as Margaret

Episode chronology
← Previous "I'm Not That Guy"	Next → "Spoiler Alert"
- How I Met Your Mother season 3

"Dowisetrepla" is the seventh episode in the third season of the television series How I Met Your Mother and 51st overall. It originally aired on CBS on November 5, 2007.

== Plot ==
Marshall and Lily finally become tired of Ted's never-ending presence and his invasion on the married couple's personal space, so they decide to rent a new apartment. In the newspaper they find an apartment in a neighborhood called "Dowisetrepla", which is explained as part of New York City's tendency to shorten neighborhood names (such as Tribeca and Soho), and is supposedly an up-and-coming neighborhood in the city. The apartment is for sale, rather than for rent, but Marshall convinces Lily to view it with him. Marshall falls in love with the apartment in Dowisetrepla, imagining himself playing drums in a band with his future sons. Lily feels guilty because of the huge credit card debt she hides from Marshall, but still imagines herself painting with two daughters and eventually ends up saying that she loves the apartment, despite Robin persisting that Lily tell Marshall the truth.

The next day, Lily and Marshall apply for a mortgage, resulting in Marshall finding out about Lily's credit card debt. Later, Ted, Barney, and Robin go home, where Ted discovers that Lily and Marshall were having a fight based on "evidence" strewn about the room. While Robin realizes that Marshall found out about the credit card debt, Ted disregards her explanation and incorrectly concludes the fight was over something minor (the peanut butter jar, Lily leaving the jar out without the lid after Marshall's repeated insistence to not do so) and hits re-dial on the apartment phone, expecting the number to be Marshall's cell phone, which Lily would have called to apologize and make up. They instead hear the receptionist of a divorce lawyer, which makes them panic at how Lily and Marshall's divorce could split the group. Lily explains to Marshall that she had the idea of divorcing Marshall so he would not be dragged down by her debt, but Marshall remarks that by marrying Lily, he married all her problems, too, and chooses to stand by her. Finally, they exclaim to the others that they bought the apartment.

The next day, Lily and Marshall take a taxi to their new home, but as they step out of the cab, they smell an extremely strong stench. The cab driver reveals that the area is near the sewage treatment plant, but the plant is shut down on weekends. They realize that "DoWiSeTrePla" is short for: DOwnWInd of the SEwage TREatment PLAnt, revealing why the real estate agent wanted the apartment to be viewed on the weekends.

== Critical response ==
Donna Bowman of The A.V. Club rated the episode A−. She compares the show to Friends and notes the appearance of actress Maggie Wheeler, who previously played Chandler's on-and-off girlfriend Janice, as the real estate agent.

Staci Krause of IGN gave the episode 8.0 out of 10. She commented: ‘The scene stealer in this episode was learning what Dowistrepla meant …….. This is likely the beginning of what could be an extremely funny story arc’
