= We're Not from Here =

- How I Met Your Mother episode
- Episode no.: Season 3 Episode 2
- Directed by: Pamela Fryman
- Written by: Chris Harris
- Production code: 3ALH02
- Original air date: October 1, 2007

Guest appearances
- Enrique Iglesias as Gael; Nikki Griffin as Lindsay; Darryl Sivad as Officer Roque; Damon Gameau as Australian Backpacker

Episode chronology
← Previous "Wait for It"	Next → "Third Wheel"
- How I Met Your Mother season 3

"We're Not from Here" is the second episode in the third season of the television series How I Met Your Mother and 46th overall. It originally aired on CBS on October 1, 2007 and was directed by Pamela Fryman.

== Plot ==
Future Ted narrates that Robin needed time away following their breakup and enjoyed her vacation with Gael, saying she felt up-tight in New York. Back in the bar she claims to be a different person, but Barney says Robin is still the same, adding that she will realize this and dump Gael soon.

Lamenting how easy it is for Gael to get women simply by being from out of town, Ted and Barney decide to pose as tourists outside MacLaren's and they strike up a conversation with two passing women, Colleen and Lindsay. The women agree to show them around town the following day and Barney suggests they meet outside MacLaren's, but Colleen and Lindsay say it is a lame bar. Ted tries to defend his favorite watering hole without revealing he is a New Yorker. To Ted's dismay, Colleen and Lindsay take him and Barney to a potato restaurant. When the women go to the bathroom, Ted complains about them being lame but Barney convinces Ted to continue with the plan and the women decide to take Ted and Barney to a friend's party. On the cab ride there, Ted questions where they are going and is terrified to learn they are heading for the South Bronx. His fears are confirmed as they end up giving descriptions to the police of three guys who have apparently mugged them. Back on the street, Ted and Barney are invited back to Colleen and Lindsay's place but Ted finally snaps when he finds out that they are actually from New Jersey. Ted chastises the women about not being from New York and derides New Jersey due to his deep seated hatred for the state. He tells them to go home, which they do by getting a ride from the police officers that interviewed them, but said officers also abandon Ted and Barney since one of them was born in Newark, New Jersey.

Lily asks Robin how things are going with Gael and Robin reveals she has become annoyed with things at home that she loved on vacation, such as being hand-fed her food by Gael (dropping spaghetti on her sofa) and him sweeping the table clear to make love to her (breaking her laptop). Robin tries to go with the flow, but when Gael invites some strange Australian backpackers to stay with him and Robin indefinitely, it results in Robin unknowingly eating a marijuana-laced blueberry muffin that one of the backpackers had baked, causing her to say some inappropriate things on the air at her news anchor job. Awoken one night by the sound of bongo drums, Robin confronts "vacation Robin" in the living room who tells her that she has lost her way since coming home. Robin retorts by saying that her vacation self is boring, lame, and getting sand everywhere. As the two are about to kiss, Robin is really woken by drums and finds the group of travelers playing in the living room. She finally gets rid of them by brandishing her gun, but the shouting wakes Gael and Robin tells him they have to break up. Barney toasts the return of the real Robin while she mentions that "vacation Robin" popped up in her dreams again and managed to seduce her.

Meanwhile, Lily and Marshall begin putting together their "death folders" containing useful information should either of them die, which includes a letter to the other, but Marshall is nervous about writing his letter to Lily. He pours his heart (and tears) out over many pages, and once finished, he decides to read Lily's letter to him and is angry to discover it is not as heart-felt as his, instead containing information on her teacher's pension and a reminder to cancel Vogue. Marshall argues with Lily over her loveless letter, resulting in their first fight as a married couple. When he asks her why she could not write a love letter like he did and Lily states it is because she cannot bear to think about not being with him, and that he would just open the letter and read it as soon as she has finished writing anyway. Marshall promises he will not, so Lily agrees to write her letter, but Marshall asks her to make the letter "dirty" and slip in some Polaroids. In November 2029, an older, balding Marshall opens the letter in his office to find Lily busting him both in writing and in her older, alive form for reading it too soon. When Marshall says Lily also broke her promise as there are no naked pictures for him, Lily says she will take some photos, but Marshall does not want them anymore, which offends Lily and sparks an argument.

== Critical response ==
- Donna Bowman of The A.V. Club rated the episode C.
- Staci Krause of IGN gave the episode 5.9 out of 10. This episode received the lowest rating from IGN from all of season 3.
