= Weekend at Barney's =

- How I Met Your Mother episode
- Episode no.: Season 8 Episode 18
- Directed by: Pamela Fryman
- Written by: George Sloan
- Original air date: February 25, 2013

Episode chronology
← Previous "The Ashtray"	Next → "The Fortress"
- How I Met Your Mother season 8

"Weekend at Barney's" is the 18th episode of the eighth season of the CBS sitcom How I Met Your Mother, and the 178th episode overall.

== Plot ==
Barney wakes up in the middle of the night, dreaming about a special play called the "Weekend at Barney's", inspired by the 1989 film Weekend at Bernie's. It angers Robin, who knows he destroyed the Playbook. After returning the wedding invitation with Jeanette as his plus-one, Ted finds that Jeanette has impulsively trashed the apartment after reading a spam email message; she breaks up with him on the spot. Marshall and Lily console him, but the gang is elated at the breakup.

Learning of Ted's plan to win Jeanette back, Barney sees it as an opportunity to find a replacement plus-one by matching up Ted at the bar using the Playbook (the copy he burned was a "ceremonial" copy). Barney sets up a station at the apartment to guide Ted with the plays. Two attempts fall flat, but as Barney guides Ted with a Scottish-themed play, Robin appears at Ted's apartment. She storms out at seeing the Playbook, causing Barney to go after her, missing Jeanette making up with Ted at the bar. Barney explains to Robin that all his plays were definitely based on lies, but it helped him realize that he loves her, winning her over with a bouquet of paper roses.

Marshall and Lily visit an art gallery where an up-and-coming artist named Strickland Stevens is showing his works. Since she is the Captain's art consultant, Lily scouts for new works while Marshall tries to crack art-related jokes. He fails with the jokes and later accidentally spills a bag of Skittles on the floor, embarrassing Lily. Marshall pledges to remain quiet, but a remark about Teenage Mutant Ninja Turtles results in him and Lily hitting things off with Stevens.

Ted returns to his apartment with Jeanette, who fumes at seeing the Playbook. His friends find him sitting on the street while she throws all his things out the window and destroys the place. As Jeanette tapes the Playbook to a batch of fireworks from Barney's prop trunk, Ted asks her not to blow it up, but Barney allows it to be destroyed. Erasing Jeanette's name from the invitation, Ted pledges to no longer date and is ready to settle down. Future Ted narrates that at that point for the first time in his life, he really meant it.

== Critical reception ==
Donna Bowman of the A.V. Club gave the episode an A.
