= How I Met Your Mother season 8 =

How I Met Your Mother
- Season 8
- The Complete Season 8. The Yellow Umbrella Edition
- Starring: Josh Radnor; Jason Segel; Cobie Smulders; Neil Patrick Harris; Alyson Hannigan
- No. of episodes: 24

Release
- Original network: CBS
- Original release: September 24, 2012 – May 13, 2013

Season chronology
- ← Previous; Season 7 Next → Season 9

The eighth season of the American television comedy series How I Met Your Mother was announced in March 2011 along with confirmation of the seventh season. The season premiered on September 24, 2012 and concluded on May 13, 2013.

In addition to the Region 1 DVD release of the season on October 1, 2013, it was also added on Netflix for streaming in the same day.

== Cast ==
=== Main cast ===
- Josh Radnor as Ted Mosby
- Jason Segel as Marshall Eriksen
- Cobie Smulders as Robin Scherbatsky
- Neil Patrick Harris as Barney Stinson
- Alyson Hannigan as Lily Aldrin
- Bob Saget as future Ted Mosby (voice only) (uncredited)

=== Recurring cast ===
- Michael Trucco as Nick Podarutti
- Ashley Williams as Victoria
- Ellen D. Williams as Patrice, Robin's coworker
- Lyndsy Fonseca as Penny, Ted's future daughter
- David Henrie as Luke, Ted's future son
- Chris Elliott as Mickey Aldrin
- Becki Newton as Quinn
- Abby Elliott as Jeanette Peterson
- Kyle MacLachlan as The Captain
- Thomas Lennon as Klaus
- Joe Manganiello as Brad Morris
- Ray Wise as Robin Scherbatsky, Sr.
- Suzie Plakson as Judy Eriksen
- Marshall Manesh as Ranjit

=== Guest stars ===
- Geddy Lee as himself
- Steven Page as himself
- Rachel Bilson as Cindy
- Ashley Benson as Carly Whittaker
- Laura Bell Bundy as Becky
- Bill Fagerbakke as Marvin Eriksen, Sr.
- David Burtka as Scooter
- Frances Conroy as Loretta Stinson
- Alexis Denisof as Sandy Rivers
- Alex Trebek as himself
- James Van Der Beek as Simon Tremblay
- Peter Gallagher as Professor Vinnick
- Mike Tyson as himself
- Seth Green as Daryl LaCourte
- Joe Lo Truglio as Honeywell
- Ralph Macchio as himself
- William Zabka as Clown/Himself
- Dave Coulier as himself
- k.d. lang as herself
- Jayma Mays as the Coat-Check Girl
- Keegan-Michael Key as Calvin
- Casey Wilson as Krirsten
- Cristin Milioti as Tracy McConnell, The Mother
- Alan Thicke as himself
- Jason Priestley as himself

== Episodes ==
Season eight episodes
No. overall	No. in season	Title	Directed by	Written by	Original release date	Prod. code	US viewers (millions)
161	1	"Farhampton"	Pamela Fryman	Carter Bays & Craig Thomas	September 24, 2012	8ALH01	8.84
To calm an anxious Robin on her wedding day to Barney, Ted recounts the story of how he persuaded Victoria to write a left-at-the-altar note to her ex-fiance Klaus explaining why she ran out on their wedding. Meanwhile, Barney attempts to hide the fact that he and Robin used to date from Quinn, but Quinn learns the truth when sleep-deprived Marshall and Lily accidentally blurt it out.
162	2	"The Pre-Nup"	Pamela Fryman	Carter Bays & Craig Thomas	October 1, 2012	8ALH02	8.17
Barney prepares a comprehensive pre-nup, causing the other guys to think about relationship amendments for their significant others. Tension sparks among the couples when Quinn sets up her own pre-nup proposal.
163	3	"Nannies"	Pamela Fryman	Chuck Tatham	October 8, 2012	8ALH03	7.82
Lily and Marshall have trouble finding a nanny when Barney comes up with an elaborate scheme to meet girls. Meanwhile, Robin and Ted fight over whose relationship is more serious.
164	4	"Who Wants to Be a Godparent?"	Pamela Fryman	Matt Kuhn	October 15, 2012	8ALH04	7.93
When Lily and Marshall can't decide on whom to appoint as godparents for baby Marvin, they put the gang to the test to see who would be the best choice.
165	5	"The Autumn of Break-Ups"	Pamela Fryman	Kourtney Kang	November 5, 2012	8ALH06	7.22
As the season of break-ups continues, Ted and Victoria decide to end their relationship. Meanwhile, Barney uses a dog as his wingman which worries Robin.
166	6	"Splitsville"	Pamela Fryman	Stephen Lloyd	November 12, 2012	8ALH05	7.95
Barney helps Robin break up with Nick, when she is hesitant to do so herself. Meanwhile, Lily and Marshall desperately look for some time alone.
167	7	"The Stamp Tramp"	Pamela Fryman	Tami Sagher	November 19, 2012	8ALH07	7.45
Marshall recommends his old law-school classmate Brad (Joe Manganiello) for a job at his firm, but the interview goes awry, and Marshall must do damage control with his boss. Meanwhile, Robin helps negotiate Barney's return to the strip club circuit.
168	8	"Twelve Horny Women"	Pamela Fryman	Eric Falconer & Romanski	November 26, 2012	8ALH08	8.73
Marshall competes against his old friend/new nemesis Brad in the most important court case of his career. Meanwhile, the rest of the gang reminisces about their run-ins with the law as teenagers; which leads to a debate over who was the biggest delinquent.
169	9	"Lobster Crawl"	Pamela Fryman	Barbara Adler	December 3, 2012	8ALH09	8.26
A determined Robin goes to great lengths to get back together with Barney. Meanwhile, Ted substitutes as Marvin's nanny, leading Marshall and Lily to realize that Ted is using baby Marvin as a replacement for his other baby, the GNB building.
170	10	"The Over-Correction"	Pamela Fryman	Craig Gerard & Matthew Zinman	December 10, 2012	8ALH10	8.82
Robin becomes suspicious of Barney's motives for dating Patrice. Meanwhile, Marshall and Lily are disturbed by the fact that his widowed mother begins dating her father.
171	11	"The Final Page"	Pamela Fryman	Dan Gregor & Doug Mand	December 17, 2012	8ALH11	8.70
172	12	"The Final Page"	Pamela Fryman	Carter Bays & Craig Thomas	December 17, 2012	8ALH12	8.70
Before the opening of his building, Ted confronts his architecture professor from college. Meanwhile, Robin confronts Patrice, Barney gets jinxed by Marshall, and Marshall and Lily run into an old friend from college. It's almost Christmas, and Barney has told Ted that he plans to propose to Patrice. Ted then must decide whether to tell Robin. Meanwhile, Lily and Marshall have their first night away from Marvin, but their plans are nearly ruined when they suffer from a case of separation anxiety.
173	13	"Band or DJ?"	Pamela Fryman	Carter Bays & Craig Thomas	January 14, 2013	8ALH13	10.51
Robin wants Barney to ask her father for permission to marry her. Lily and Ted feud about planning the wedding, which gets Ted to admit his regrets about letting go of Robin and Lily to confess her regrets about motherhood and her career. Baby Marvin's bout of constipation stresses Lily and Marshall.
174	14	"Ring Up!"	Pamela Fryman	Jennifer Hendriks	January 21, 2013	8ALH14	10.07
Even though Ted and his new girlfriend share none of the same interests, Barney urges Ted to sleep with her, until they find out she is Barney's half-sister. Meanwhile, Robin is adapting to her new status as an engaged woman.
175	15	"P.S. I Love You"	Pamela Fryman	Carter Bays & Craig Thomas	February 4, 2013	8ALH15	10.30
While trying to find out the identity of the person with whom Robin was once obsessed, Barney uncovers the 'Robin Sparkles' episode of the music-documentary series Underneath the Tunes. Marshall and Lily are concerned that Ted's latest girlfriend might be stalking him.
176	16	"Bad Crazy"	Pamela Fryman	Carter Bays & Craig Thomas	February 11, 2013	8ALH16	8.98
Ted is reluctant to break up with his girlfriend Jeanette despite her unstable behavior, and Lily offers him advice. Meanwhile, after an adventurous experience babysitting, Robin finally overcomes her fear of holding baby Marvin and becomes emotionally attached to him. Guest starring Mike Tyson.
177	17	"The Ashtray"	Pamela Fryman	Carter Bays & Craig Thomas	February 18, 2013	8ALH18	8.85
Zoey's ex-husband, The Captain, unexpectedly calls Ted, and the gang reminisces about what happened when they last saw him a year and a half earlier. Lily gets a surprising new career opportunity when The Captain offers her a job as his art consultant.
178	18	"Weekend at Barney's"	Pamela Fryman	George Sloan	February 25, 2013	8ALH17	8.59
After Ted and Jeanette part ways, Barney steps in as matchmaker using the supposedly-destroyed Playbook. Meanwhile, Marshall has some embarrassing moments at an art gallery opening where Lily is battling to make a good impression.
179	19	"The Fortress"	Michael Shea	Stephen Lloyd	March 18, 2013	8ALH20	7.44
Barney reluctantly attempts to sell his apartment by holding an open house, during which Ted and Marshall get mistaken for a couple. Tension arises between Lily and Marshall when her new job causes her to spend less time at home.
180	20	"The Time Travelers"	Pamela Fryman	Carter Bays & Craig Thomas	March 25, 2013	8ALH19	6.99
Ted and Barney's future versions attempt to persuade present day Ted to go see Robots Versus Wrestlers. Marshall challenges Robin to a dance-off after she is given credit at MacLaren's for a cocktail he invented.
181	21	"Romeward Bound"	Pamela Fryman	Chuck Tatham	April 15, 2013	8ALH22	6.58
The Captain asks Lily to relocate to Rome for a year to work as his art consultant, but she is afraid Marshall will resent her if she agrees. Ted and Barney notice a beautiful woman wearing a puffy coat and become obsessed with finding out what she's hiding.
182	22	"The Bro Mitzvah"	Pamela Fryman	Chris Harris	April 29, 2013	8ALH21	7.06
The gang brainstorms to plan the ultimate bachelor party for Barney.
183	23	"Something Old"	Pamela Fryman	Carter Bays & Craig Thomas	May 6, 2013	8ALH23	6.99
Robin desperately tries to locate the antique locket that she buried in Central Park (when she visited at 14 years old) to wear as her "Something Old" for the wedding. Meanwhile, Marshall and Lily ask Ted to help them pack for Italy and Barney invites Robin's father to play Laser Tag in order to bond with him.
184	24	"Something New"	Pamela Fryman	Carter Bays & Craig Thomas	May 13, 2013	8ALH24	8.57
As the gang prepares to go to Robin and Barney's wedding, Ted invites Lily to see the final renovations he made on his house in Westchester. Meanwhile, Robin and Barney's night of relaxation is ruined by an obnoxious couple and Marshall takes baby Marvin on a last-minute trip to visit his family in Minnesota. The episode concludes with The Mother onscreen for the first time.

== Reception ==
The eighth season of How I Met Your Mother received mixed reactions. The review aggregation site Rotten Tomatoes reported that 54% of 13 critics gave it a positive review, with an average rating of 6.1/10. The consensus reads: "How I Met Your Mother wears out its welcome this season, with an anticlimactic reveal and rote, less-than-fruitful humor."

Alexander Lowe of We Got This Covered criticised the reveal of the mother, writing: "After 8 long years and 192 episodes of How I Met Your Mother, the future Mrs. Ted Mosby has finally been revealed. And it was dreadfully anticlimactic". Matt Roush of TV Guide Was critical of its season premiere, writing: "I find it hard not to stifle a yawn. Move on, show, and please give serious thought to wrapping things up this season while we might still care." While the majority of the reviews were mixed, some were positive, with Donna Bowman from The A.V. Club giving its season premiere "Farhampton" a "B" grade.

== Ratings ==
No.	Title	Air date	Rating/share	Rating/share (18–49)	Viewers (million)
1	Farhampton	September 24, 2012	5.4/8	3.6/11	8.84
2	The Pre-Nup	October 1, 2012	5.1/8	3.3/9	8.17
3	Nannies	October 8, 2012	5.1/8	3.1/9	7.82
4	Who Wants to Be a Godparent?	October 15, 2012	5.0/8	3.2/9	7.93
5	The Autumn of Break-Ups	November 5, 2012	4.6/7	2.8/7	7.22
6	Splitsville	November 12, 2012	5.0/7	3.0/8	7.95
7	The Stamp Tramp	November 19, 2012	5.1/8	2.9/8	7.45
8	Twelve Horny Women	November 26, 2012	5.6/8	3.3/9	8.73
9	Lobster Crawl	December 3, 2012	5.3/8	3.1/9	8.26
10	The Over-Correction	December 10, 2012	5.7/9	3.2/9	8.82
11/12	The Final Page	December 17, 2012	5.4/8	3.4/9	8.70
13	Band or DJ?	January 14, 2013	6.4/10	3.9/11	10.42
14	Ring Up!	January 21, 2013	6.2/9	3.7/10	10.07
15	P.S. I Love You	February 4, 2013	6.5/10	4.0/11	10.30
16	Bad Crazy	February 11, 2013	5.8/9	3.2/9	8.98
17	The Ashtray	February 18, 2013	5.6/8	3.4/10	8.85
18	Weekend at Barney's	February 25, 2013	5.5/8	3.3/10	8.59
19	The Fortress	March 18, 2013	4.7/7	3.0/9	7.44
20	The Time Travelers	March 25, 2013	3.8/6	2.7/8	6.99
21	Romeward Bound	April 15, 2013	4.3/7	2.7/8	6.58
22	The Bro Mitzvah	April 29, 2013	4.4/7	2.7/9	7.06
23	Something Old	May 6, 2013	4.4/7	2.6/8	6.99
24	Something New	May 13, 2013	4.4/7	3.4/11	8.57
