= The Final Page =

- How I Met Your Mother episodes
- Episode nos.: Season 8 Episodes 11 and 12
- Directed by: Pamela Fryman
- Written by: Dan Gregor (Part 1); Doug Mand (Part 1); Carter Bays (Part 2); Craig Thomas (Part 2)
- Original air date: December 17, 2012

Guest appearances
- Seth Green as Daryl; Peter Gallagher as Professor Vinick; Chris Elliott as Mickey; Marshall Manesh as Ranjit; Alexis Denisof as Sandy Rivers; Ellen D. Williams as Patrice

Episode chronology
← Previous "The Over-Correction"	Next → "Band or DJ?"
- How I Met Your Mother season 8

"The Final Page" is an hour-long episode of the eighth season of the CBS sitcom How I Met Your Mother. It aired in two half-hour episodes on December 17, 2012.

== Plot ==
Part 1

Marshall calls "Jinx" on Barney when they utter the same phrase simultaneously. Future Ted explains the group takes the game very seriously; Barney had previously broken the jinx out of mockery, but later had been hit by a bus, causing everyone to follow the rules whenever they are jinxed, including Barney jinxing Marshall just as he was about to talk with one of his boyhood heroes. The group relishes Barney's silence. Ted's new building is set to open and he invites his favorite architecture professor, Vinick, from his college days to the grand opening. The group says that Ted has put the professor in his "pit", in that he has obsessed over him since college. This is further confirmed when the professor declines the invitation. Ted takes the group to Wesleyan, intending to unleash his wrath on Vinick. After hearing one of his inspiring lectures, Ted craves Vinick's approval and shows him a sketch of the GNB building. Vinick is unimpressed and Ted brings a 3-D model, but Vinick views the attempt as pathetic. Ted realizes he has to move on.

Marshall and Lily explain they are in someone else's pit. Daryl, a friend from college, became obsessed with the two, causing them to feel uncomfortable. They run into Daryl at Wesleyan, having formed a company selling hacky sacks named after the three of them. He invites them to his house; Marshall and Lily fear they will be killed, but find that Daryl's company has become successful, and they unknowingly reject his offer to give them $100,000, claiming it was partly their idea. Daryl seems to accept that they do not want any part of his life.

Robin has Patrice in her pit and when Sandy Rivers tasks her with laying off employees, she plans to fire Patrice for getting together with the man she loves. Midway through the firing, Patrice realizes that Robin is hurt by her dating Barney, and gives her a consoling hug; which Robin reciprocates and apologizes. She resolves to move on and lets Patrice stay.

At the end of the day, Barney secretly tricks Ted into saying his name by showing him a wedding ring, breaking the jinx. Barney explains that he is serious and makes Ted promise not to tell anyone he plans to propose to Patrice and unjinks Ted when he agrees. He then gets revenge on Marshall and Lily by putting them into an indefinite jinx themselves.

Part 2

Ted's new building is opening that night, but he is distracted by his promise to Barney; he winds up asking Robin to be his date to the gala when he loses the nerve to tell her. When Ted meets up with Robin in Ranjit's limo, he tells her. Robin claims to be fine with Barney's plans, she admits that she has still loved him for a long time, but cannot keep chasing after Barney if he will never feel the same way about her. Finally letting go of his pursuit of her, Ted takes Robin to the WWN building where Barney intends to propose to Patrice.

Marshall and Lily are excited to have their first evening away from baby Marvin, thanks to her father Mickey taking care of him. Marshall hears about Barney and the two end up missing Marvin. They decide they are more content spending the night back home with him.

When Robin heads to the roof of the building, she sees no sign of Patrice. Instead she finds a page from Barney's Playbook, titled "The Robin". Barney had a long plan to get back together with Robin, which started with proclaiming his love for Robin and intentionally getting shot down. He went to Patrice for help and pretended to date her so that Robin would realize her feelings for him. When Barney arrives, Robin feels that she cannot trust Barney because of how he manipulated her to get to this moment. He asks her to turn the page over and she does; it reads "Hope she says yes." When she puts the page down, she sees Barney down on one knee holding the ring, asking her to marry him. She tearfully accepts, and they embrace and kiss as snow begins to fall.

At the gala, a GNB executive proposes a toast to Ted. While Robin, Barney, Marshall, and Lily are shown happily in their respective couplings, Ted stares out from the GNB building alone; his future uncertain.

== Production ==
One of my favorite parts about my job is helping to share music from relatively unknown acts with a larger audience. We went through a ton of songs for this scene – including songs from much bigger acts – but this song won the day, and it was one of the most popular song uses in the show's history. I still hear from people about this one, thanking me for helping them discover this band.

— Andy Gowman, How I Met Your Mother music supervisor

Originally, episodes 11 and 12 were not planned to be shown together as a two-part, one-hour combined episode, but the decision was made to present them together after the show was preempted because of Hurricane Sandy. Show co-creator Carter Bays said, "we knew we wanted [episode 12] to be our Christmas episode, and we were thinking of creative ways to catch up. ... Episodes 11 and 12 really felt like two halves of the same story, so we thought, let's make this our big hour-long Christmas special." Before the two episodes were combined, episode 11 was entitled "The Silence of the Jinx" and episode 12 was entitled "The Robin".

Bays said that "the idea of a long con" represented by Barney's play to win Robin was influenced by "the final run of episodes in season four of Breaking Bad and that they "wanted a moment of, 'Ohhhhh, that's what's been going on.' Just without anyone getting blown up or poisoned." He adds that they are "not blind to the possible ickiness of how Barney went about getting Robin to say yes" but that it shows Barney's character "in a nutshell: loveable amorality."

Series co-creator Craig Thomas added that Ted and Robin's scene in the limo packed unexpected power because the script did not call for the two characters to be teary-eyed.

== Critical reception ==
Donna Bowman of The A.V. Club gave the episode an A. She calls the episode "hilarious" and "touching". She says that the show "deftly and imaginatively" turned "Barney the womanizer into Barney the fiancé." She called making "Patrice ... part of the final play" a "brilliant idea". She adds that "nearly every character gets great material" in the episode.

Ethan Alter of Television Without Pity gave the episode a C+. He described the episode as "not good" and the storyline of Barney and Robin's reunion as "painfully drawn-out". He referred to the presence of Peter Gallagher and Seth Green as "the upside" of the episode and using the "Silence of the Lambs motif as both a comic and dramatic device" as "the downside". He describes the trip to Wesleyan as "obvious, but not entirely unenjoyable filler." He says that the reveal of the final play and Barney's proposal comes "to nobody's surprise besides Robin's."

Michael Arbeiter of Hollywood.com writes that "this week's 'big twist' that Barney was actually using his relationship with Patrice as a cover for his plan to propose to Robin is a far cry from surprising, and as such not as effective as the show might have hoped it would be." Overall, he calls the episode "one of the stronger of the season's outputs" but notes that "the show has lost a ton of its luster." He also comments that "an appearance by Ranjit can always be celebrated."

Max Nicholson of IGN gave the episode a score of 7.8/10 (Good). He writes that Seth Green's "pathetic obsession with Lily and Marshall offered a few chuckles, as did Barney's sustained silence throughout the proceedings." He says that "in the second half ... Marshall and Lily's story took a notable downturn" but that it ends "with a satisfying reunion for Barney and Robin."

Sandra Gonzalez of EW.com said that the first part was "a great episode in and of itself." About the second part she commented that "the proposal ... was great because it was 100 percent from Barney's heart."
