= Romeward Bound =

- How I Met Your Mother episode
- Episode no.: Season 8 Episode 21
- Directed by: Pamela Fryman
- Written by: Chuck Tatham
- Original air date: April 15, 2013

Guest appearances
- Kyle MacLachlan as George "The Captain" Van Smoot; Mircea Monroe as Liddy; Robert Baxt as Bernard; Mario di Donato as Auctioneer; Jocelyn Osorio as Bellissima

Episode chronology
← Previous "The Time Travelers"	Next → "The Bro Mitzvah"
- How I Met Your Mother season 8

"Romeward Bound" is the 21st episode of the eighth season of the CBS sitcom How I Met Your Mother, and the 181st episode overall.

== Plot ==
The Captain announces he is moving to Rome, and asks Lily to come with him as his art consultant for a year. Lily turns him down, reasoning that Marshall is happy in his current job at Honeywell & Cootes and will not want to move. She discusses this with the gang, who argue that Marshall would be happy to move to Italy, but Lily stands by her decision. Visiting Marshall at work, Lily finds most of the office empty as the firm lost a lot of business after the case against Gruber Pharmaceuticals, leaving him as one of only two workers remaining. Furious that Marshall has kept the truth from her, Lily tells him of the offer she just turned down. Marshall concurs that he would love to move to Rome, and speaks with the Captain. When the Captain offers the job again, Lily turns him down, and later admits to Marshall that after her bad experiences in San Francisco, she is apprehensive about such a big move, especially since they will have no friends and cannot speak Italian. When Marshall assures Lily that she will be fine, and they will have each other for support, she decides to take the job.

At the bar, Ted and Barney spot a woman wearing a large, puffy coat. The woman, Liddy, attends the same yoga class as Ted. While Barney's schemes for Liddy to remove her coat fail, Robin arrives and reveals that Liddy is Barney and Robin's wedding planner. Robin is also curious about what's underneath the coat and when Liddy goes to the bathroom, Barney bemoans the fact that Marshall is not present. Barney reasons that because Marshall is attached to someone, women would not be suspicious of his motives. When Robin points out that the same applies to Barney, he succeeds at getting Liddy to remove her coat, leaving Robin and Barney astounded by her figure. After Robin and Liddy leave the bar, Ted expresses his concern that Robin will not be happy with Barney's behavior. Barney becomes angry with Ted for presuming that Ted knows more about Robin than he does, and Ted apologizes. Barney finds Robin waiting for him wearing nothing but the coat, causing him to turn up the thermostat.

== Critical reception ==
Donna Bowman of The A.V. Club gave the episode a B−.

Max Nicholson of IGN said the episode explores some intriguing territory between Ted and Barney, while delivering a so-so story, and in the end he gave the episode a 6.7 out of 10.

TV.com's Bill Kuchman said the episode was one of the "buzzkill episodes at the most unfortunate times" by pointing out recycled plot hooks from earlier in the season.

Alan Sepinwall of Hitfix.com critiqued the episode as a "sampling" of problems that have appeared in the season at the expense of off-the-mark jokes.
