= Lobster Crawl =

- How I Met Your Mother episode
- Episode no.: Season 8 Episode 9
- Directed by: Pamela Fryman
- Written by: Barbara Adler
- Original air date: December 3, 2012

Guest appearances
- Chelan Simmons as Brandi; Ellen D. Williams as Patrice

Episode chronology
← Previous "Twelve Horny Women"	Next → "The Over-Correction"
- How I Met Your Mother season 8

"Lobster Crawl" is the ninth episode of the eighth season of the CBS sitcom How I Met Your Mother, and the 169th episode overall. It originally aired on December 3, 2012.

The episode's plot centers on Robin's stubborn pursuit of Barney despite his rejection, which Lily compares to Robin's physical allergy to lobsters. Meanwhile, Ted's over-involvement in baby Marvin's developmental milestones causes friction with Marshall and Lily, and Barney attempts to market "Bro-Bibs" after ruining one of his favorite ties.

The episode was directed by Pamela Fryman and written by Barbara Adler. It received mixed-to-positive reviews from critics; commentators praised the individual character moments and the sincerity of the Barney-Robin dynamic, but criticized Ted's storyline as being one-dimensional and contrived.

== Plot ==
The gang dines out at MacLaren's with baby Marvin and Marshall and Lily are confident anyone can take care of Marvin. Since Lily's father Mickey is ill, Ted volunteers to take care of the baby. Ted is always present for the baby's firsts, such as learning to crawl, which angers Lily. When Ted cancels a meeting with a headhunter for a new project in order to spend time with Marvin, Marshall and Lily fire him as a babysitter. They reconcile with him after discovering that he made a scrapbook of Marvin's firsts, and persuade him to meet the headhunter. A flashforward sees Marshall and Lily taking Ted's daughter to see Santa Claus as payback for taking Marvin to see Santa for the first time.

Having rebuffed Marshall's attempts to get some of his food, Barney accidentally spills ketchup on one of his favorite ties. Despondent that his tie has "died", he mourns its loss but later has a business idea. He intends to produce "Bro-Bibs", a line of adult-themed bibs designed to protect men's clothes against spilled food.

Meanwhile, Lily notices that Robin has been flirting with Barney even though he made it clear he will never pursue her again. She tries to discourage Robin from trying it again, and brings up the time Robin was diagnosed as allergic to lobsters. After learning about the allergy, Robin deliberately ate lobster because she knew she could not have it; Lily links Robin's feelings for Barney to Robin's allergy. Robin stubbornly refuses to listen and tries various methods to get his attention, with all of them failing. During Robin's last play, Barney winds up seducing WWN's new weather forecaster Brandi, but he changes his mind after realizing that he has been feeling adrift since breaking up with Quinn. Robin decides to give him space, but arrives at Barney's apartment to seduce him again. To her surprise, he is on a date with Patrice, who has been giving him advice about his problems. Robin leaves before they notice her.

== Critical reception ==
Donna Bowman of The A.V. Club gave the episode a B+. She says that the episode "doesn't have the effortless exuberance of the very best HIMYM episodes. But it has an overflowing lollipop bin of throwaway lines and little character moments." She also notes that while "some people will dismiss the rollercoaster of the Barney-Robin pairing as just ... by the numbers sitcom writing ... it has a kind of sincerity ... that I can't help but respect."

Michael Arbeiter of Hollywood.com writes that while it is "one of the better episodes of the present season, ... [it] falters in regards to one incredibly important element: Ted." He says that "Ted has been used as set dressing" and "even his comedy is pretty one-dimensional these days." Regarding the Robin and Barney romance he writes, "I'm ready for their back-and-forth to be done with. It's tiresome."

Max Nicholson of IGN gave the episode a score of 5.9/10 (Mediocre), saying that "for the most part, I did enjoy Ted's babysitting storyline" but "tying the whole thing in to Ted's work felt a bit contrived." He says that "Barney's 'Bro Bib' storyline was decent, if not a little distracting" and calls the final scene "bizarre." Overall, he argues that the episode "did ... feature one pleasant (if not flawed) storyline and a few gratifying jokes."

Angel Cohn of Television Without Pity gave the episode a C−, saying that overall the episode was "pretty damn terrible. So much so that if it wasn't my job to watch it, I would have turned it off." Cohn says, "I miss laughter and writing down lines that cracked me up, but instead my notes are filled with things that annoyed me. It's depressing."
