= Splitsville (How I Met Your Mother) =

- How I Met Your Mother episode
- Episode no.: Season 8 Episode 6
- Directed by: Pamela Fryman
- Written by: Stephen Lloyd
- Original air date: November 12, 2012

Guest appearances
- Michael Trucco as Nick Padarotti; Ellen D. Williams as Patrice

Episode chronology
← Previous "The Autumn of Break-Ups"	Next → "The Stamp Tramp"
- How I Met Your Mother season 8

"Splitsville" is the sixth episode of the eighth season of the CBS sitcom How I Met Your Mother, and the 166th episode overall.

== Plot ==
Robin has not had sex with Nick in days because Nick had a groin injury from being a ringer with the Force Majeurs, Marshall's team in the Midtown Professionals Basketball League. She has seen that Nick is dumb and does not catch on to her hints that they should break up. Barney presents her with an ultimatum: She must break up with Nick by 8pm or he will post an online invitation about Robin going out with her annoying co-worker Patrice for a whole day. Barney suggests that the breakup take place at Splitsville, a nearby cafe where couples go to break up.

During the date, Robin tries to tell Nick that they are breaking up and puts her phone on speaker so Lily, Marshall, Ted and Barney can hear the breakup. He gets despondent because his doctor called about an MRI scan on his groin—the injury is enough to put him out of action for the season. Marshall is angry at the degree of the injury because he was banking on Nick to lead the Majeurs to the playoffs. When Nick's amorous gestures sway Robin from breaking up, Barney marches down to the cafe and proclaims his love for Robin. It is too much for Nick, who cries so hard about a broken heart, he attracts the attention of two crying women who were just dumped. Barney and Robin walk down the street and she thanks him for helping. Barney says he was covering for her being his bro. They almost kiss, but because he forgot to put down the invitation, Patrice calls up Robin and their special day pushes through.

Marshall works out inside the apartment, while Lily is aroused by sexual images of a ringer that another MPBL team, the Number Crunchers, used against the Majeurs and even imagines an orgy involving Barney, Robin, Nick and the two women he picked up. Disgusted, Ted confronts Lily and Marshall on why they have not had sex in months, having seen this behavior previous times. They admit it is because Marvin cries whenever the two get intimate or when Marshall barely touches her. Ted takes out Marvin for a stroll while Marshall and Lily get down to business.

Ted also plays in the MPBL with his team of architects, the T-Squares. As playing coach, he brags about a crazy buzzer beater shot against the Crunchers, but the shot was not allowed and the Crunchers win the game, 112–0. Ted meets up with his teammates, who throw him off the team by ordering a banana split for him.

== Critical reception ==
Donna Bowman of the A.V. Club gave the episode an A−, stating that "Robin and Nick's breakup is the best—meaning funniest and most meaningful—of 'The Autumn of Break-Ups'." She describes Nick as "a comedy machine" and calls Barney's declaration of love for Robin as "classically beautiful".

Angel Cohn of Television Without Pity gave the episode a C− and expresses disbelief that Robin could be just discovering that Nick is stupid. Cohn dismisses Barney's speech to Nick as "blah blah blah" and also calls the plotline of Ted's basketball team "ridiculous".

Max Nicholson of IGN gave the episode a score of 5.2/10 (Mediocre), saying that "aside from a couple laughs involving Ted and Marshall, [it] was stunningly average." He writes that "Nick's exit felt contrived and meaningless." He says that "the B-stories weren't as annoying as usual," although he calls Ted's subplot "lame" and says Marshall and Lily's problem "felt tacked on and inconsequential."

Michael Arbeiter of Hollywood.com wrote that the episode "is just another showcase of how lazy the program seems to have become." He describes making Nick as stupid as he is "the grossest example of lethargic writing." He also comments that Barney's speech about loving Robin had "hardly any immediate lead-up" and so "seems a little out of the blue and unsubstantiated."
