= The Ashtray =

- How I Met Your Mother episode
- Episode no.: Season 8 Episode 17
- Directed by: Pamela Fryman
- Written by: Carter Bays; Craig Thomas
- Cinematography by: Christian La Fountaine
- Editing by: Sue Federman
- Original air date: February 18, 2013

Guest appearances
- Kyle MacLachlan as George "The Captain" Van Smoot; Laura Bell Bundy as Becky; Becky Baeling as Shelly

Episode chronology
← Previous "Bad Crazy"	Next → "Weekend at Barney's"
- How I Met Your Mother season 8

"The Ashtray" is the 17th episode of the eighth season of the CBS sitcom How I Met Your Mother, and the 177th episode overall. It originally aired on CBS in the United States on February 18, 2013. In the episode, Ted, Robin and Lily recount their previous encounter with George "The Captain" Van Smoot at an art gallery, with the former two recalling events inaccurately due to their then inebriated frame of mind. Written by series creators Carter Bays and Craig Thomas and directed by Pamela Fryman, the episode featured guest appearances by Kyle MacLachlan as The Captain, Laura Bell Bundy as Becky and Becky Baeling as Shelly.

The episode received mostly positive reviews from online critics, who generally commended its "structural cleverness" while criticizing its "weak" plot.

== Plot ==
When Zoey's ex-husband, the Captain, unexpectedly calls Ted, the gang reminisces about what happened when they last saw him a year and a half earlier. Ted tells Barney and Marshall that he, Robin, and Lily had attended a gallery opening a year and a half ago, after Ted and Zoey had broken up and he was dating Becky. The Captain and his art consultant Shelly showed up at the gallery; Ted recalled the Captain looked tense but had invited them all to view a painting at his apartment. After he threatened Ted with a harpoon gun, Ted claims that the Captain mentioned he had moved on. However, Ted screamed upon seeing that the Captain had a picture of Becky.

When Ted calls the Captain, he asks for Robin's number. Robin tells the guys her part of the story, revealing that Ted was high on a "sandwich" (Note: In past episodes, Future Ted has used the word "sandwich" as a euphemism for marijuana.) and the Captain was hitting on her, making her feel uncomfortable. At the Captain's apartment, she walked into his bedroom and saw the Captain lying on the bed in a seductive manner. According to Robin, she turned him down. On the advice of the group, she calls the Captain to tell him she is engaged. It is then revealed that the Captain has been referring to Lily, having mixed up Robin and Lily's names.

Lily tells her side of the story, revealing to the group that Robin was actually drunk at the gallery opening, and was flirting with the Captain, while the picture Ted saw was of a yacht magazine cover with a small photo of Becky in the corner. When the Captain showed Lily the abstract masterpiece he had acquired in his bedroom, Lily felt that the elephant painting from the gallery would look better, though he dismissed her opinion because she was a kindergarten teacher. Lily took those words to heart, and stole his ashtray in retaliation.

Marshall and Lily proceed to argue with each other, with Lily admitting that she regrets not following her artistic dreams and deciding to be a mother instead. Though Marshall reassures her that she will be able to pursue her art career some day, Lily worries about her dimming chances.

Meanwhile, Barney repeatedly attempts to insert himself into Ted, Robin, and Lily's story. He eventually admits that while everyone else has something they are passionate about, Barney feels the only thing that makes him stand out is being involved in crazy stories. Ted and Robin invent a part of the story where Barney seduces the Captain's art consultant using a play from "The Playbook" so Barney is included.

The next morning, Lily meets the Captain at his apartment to return the ashtray and finds out why he needed to see her – after that gallery opening, he bought the elephant painting and hung it in his bedroom. He is now selling it for $4,000,000, after the artist had become a star in the last year and a half. To make it up to Lily for his harsh words to her, he offers Lily a job as his new art consultant. The episode concludes with the group celebrating Lily's new job.

In the post-credits scene, Barney is shown seducing Shelly at the art show, suggesting that he really was there.

== Critical reception ==
Max Nicholson of IGN gave "The Ashtray" a score of 7.7 out of 10, stating that though the episode has a "middling C story", overall it "was bolstered by a clever use of story structure and much needed character development for Lily." Farihah Zaman of The A.V. Club gave the episode a B. Kevin Fitzpatrick of ScreenCrush gave it a positive review, albeit with reservations, stating that the episode's use of multiple perspectives is overall "a tried and true formula for tonight's 'How I Met Your Mother,' but one showing as much gray hairs as The Captain himself." Alan Sepinwall of Uproxx expressed that the episode "wasn't great, but it was at least a reminder of the structural cleverness 'HIMYM' has played with at its best."

Phoebe Reilly of Vulture gave the episode one out of five stars, panning the episode's flashback-based storyline which she called "flimsy" and "irrelevant".
