= The Fortress (How I Met Your Mother) =

- How I Met Your Mother episode
- Episode no.: Season 8 Episode 19
- Directed by: Michael Shea
- Written by: Stephen Lloyd
- Original air date: March 18, 2013

Episode chronology
← Previous "Weekend at Barney's"	Next → "The Time Travelers"
- How I Met Your Mother season 8

"The Fortress" is the 19th episode of the eighth season of the CBS sitcom How I Met Your Mother, and the 179th episode overall.

== Plot ==
Robin asks Barney where they should live after the wedding. Barney said they are going to live in his apartment, but Robin refuses because he has bedded countless women there. Barney agrees to find a new place, but also wants the apartment to go to someone who will appreciate it. When Ted rejects Barney's offer, Barney tells Robin that he could not find anyone to take the apartment.

Robin arranges for an open house and Barney explains the features while recounting his sexual escapades. Robin accuses him of trying to scare off potential buyers, which he denies. Despite his efforts a couple declares that they want the apartment.

Marshall is growing frustrated that Lily's new job as the Captain's art consultant is stopping them from spending time with each other and Marvin. Ted convinces Marshall to break his promise not to watch Woodworthy Manor, a British drama (a parody of Downton Abbey), without Lily. When Lily arrives late to Robin's open house, she finds that Marshall and Ted are posing as a gay British couple with Marvin as their child to help encourage potential buyers. While maintaining his gay persona, people mistake his argument with Lily as her scolding him for being a gay man. The ruse falls apart when Ted is caught making out with a woman.

At the bar, Marshall scolds Lily for abandoning him. When Lily receives a call from the Captain about another assignment, she asks to put it on hold for now to reconcile with Marshall. Barney agrees to sell the apartment because he wants Robin to be happy. She reveals she rejected the couple after learning they were going to tear the place down and rebuild it because she loves him. The woman Ted met at the open house leads Ted away, claiming she will show him what it is like to be with a woman. The gang gathers at Barney's apartment to watch another Woodworthy Manor episode, but Robin and Barney use a secret chute in the kitchen to escape.

== Critical reception ==
Donna Bowman of the A.V. Club gave the episode an A−.

Max Nicholson of IGN praised some scenes as enjoyable and funny but complained most of the episode was "outrageous" things from Barney.
