= The Stamp Tramp =

- How I Met Your Mother episode
- Episode no.: Season 8 Episode 7
- Directed by: Pamela Fryman
- Written by: Tami Sagher
- Original air date: November 19, 2012

Guest appearances
- Joe Manganiello as Brad; Joe Lo Truglio as Mr. Honeywell

Episode chronology
← Previous "Splitsville"	Next → "Twelve Horny Women"
- How I Met Your Mother season 8

"The Stamp Tramp" is the seventh episode of the eighth season of the CBS sitcom How I Met Your Mother, and the 167th episode overall. The title refers to the "tramp stamp", a kind of tattoo on one's lower back.

== Plot ==
On his way to work, Marshall runs into his old law school classmate Brad, who has been a bum for the past two years, and recommends him to his bosses as an associate partner. The gang is displeased because he always gives stamps of approval to everyone and everything; even earning the ire of a senior partner, Henry Honeywell, after treating his colleagues to food from a restaurant with unsanitary health ratings. Lily warns him that this could even affect his performance in the case against Gruber Pharmaceuticals. Honeywell is unimpressed with Brad's attitude and removes Marshall from the case, but he gets back with Ted and Lily's help.

At the hearing, Marshall and Honeywell are stunned to see Brad among Gruber's lawyers. The company, which had actually hired Brad during those two years he told Marshall he was unemployed, planted him as a bum to spy on the law firm. Honeywell warns Marshall that he will be fired if Gruber, now informed of the plaintiff's battle plan, wins the case.

Ted tries to dispel Lily's claim that he has never sealed his own stamp of approval and piggybacked on everybody else's ideas. He pulls out his old video diary tapes from college to prove a point, but instead confirms their claims while also humiliating him. Lily is touched when she sees one video entry where Ted approved of her as Marshall's potential soulmate after they went out on their third date.

Barney has discovered that his ex-fiancée, Quinn, has returned to stripping at the Lusty Leopard. Since appearing there would make things awkward for both of them, Barney decides to find a new strip club. Numerous strip clubs woo him over and a Lusty Leopard employee begs him to stay. When Robin suggests further options, Barney lets her negotiate with the strip clubs. Her dealing results in Barney being the next patron of the seniors' joint Golden Oldies. He fires Robin when he learns that the strip club bribed her with gifts. They reconcile by getting drunk at Barney's new strip club, the Mouth Beach. Barney and Robin reflect on what happened and he kisses her - she momentarily returns it but soon rebuffs him and leaves.

== Critical reception ==
The episode received mixed reviews.

Todd van der Werff of the A.V. Club graded the episode a B, writing that in general the show "really does feel like a story that's kept going past its sell-by date," but that this episode "is one of the better half hours of the season, though it still features some of the show's recent comedic problems." He also noted that the story involving Marshall "elevates this episode from merely pleasant to downright enjoyable."

Hillary Busis of Entertainment Weekly described the plot involving Barney and Robin as "silly" and the story involving Ted and Lily as "sweet". With the story involving Marshall she commented that the return of Brad to the show was a "reason to be excited".

Phoebe Reilly of Vulture.com reported that she had "nothing but praise" for the episode because it had "a solid driving device, memorable callbacks, and even a twist that we didn't see coming," referring to Brad working for Gruber. She noted that "it's hard to add plausible dimensions to old characters," so "Ted’s being a 'piggyback stamper' ... really got us" because "this didn't feel like a tacked-on trait."

On the other hand, Michael Arbeiter of Hollywood.com said that the episode "doesn't offer much". He describes the Barney & Robin plot as having "a vile (sic) of energy that is almost bone-dry" and as "nonsense ... without so much as a single solid joke." Even the kiss at the end he calls "sudden, lazy, and unsurprising." With Brad and Marshall he writes that "in exchange for an easy plot twist [they] sell old Brad's character down the river." He says that no plot line is ever "utterly 'useless,' but "Ted's story this week is the closest thing to it."

Ethan Alter of Television Without Pity gave the episode a C, saying that overall it was a "moderately funny episode" that was "largely a time-waster that didn't advance the overarching plot in any significant way," although lately the overarching plot has been "terrible." He says the Barney & Robin story has a "belabored set-up" leading to a "dated pop culture joke." He says that Ted's story this week is "not much of a plot," although "douchey College Ted is one of the few remaining reliable sources of humor that this show has left."

Max Nicholson of IGN gave the episode a score of 5.3/10 (Mediocre), saying it was "pretty drab," but "noticeably more tolerable that before" and "still generally lacking in overall entertainment value." He wrote that the episode "featured a nice arc for Ted" and that "college Ted and Marshall are almost always good for a laugh." He commented that "Brad's return wasn't all it was cracked up to be" as the show "sullied a once liked character by turning them into someone else completely," He said that the Barney and Robin plot was "the most ludicrous and least inspired" storyline.
