= The Over-Correction =

- How I Met Your Mother episode
- Episode no.: Season 8 Episode 10
- Directed by: Pamela Fryman
- Written by: Craig Gerard; Matthew Zinman
- Original air date: December 10, 2012

Guest appearances
- Suzie Plakson as Judy Eriksen; Chris Elliott as Mickey Aldrin; Ellen D. Williams as Patrice

Episode chronology
← Previous "Lobster Crawl"	Next → "The Final Page – Part 1"
- How I Met Your Mother season 8

"The Over-Correction" is the tenth episode of the eighth season of the CBS sitcom How I Met Your Mother, and the 170th episode overall.

== Plot ==
Robin, Marshall, Lily, and Ted are trapped in different closets. Future Ted narrates how things came to be.

A week earlier at MacLaren's, Marshall and Lily tell Ted and Robin that Marshall's mother Judy is sleeping over at their apartment; much to Lily's chagrin as the apartment is already crowded due to her father Mickey moving in to help care for their son Marvin. Judy tells Lily that having gotten over the death of her husband, she is ready to date again so Lily gives her advice on how to express her sexuality. While Lily is out, a horrified Marshall catches Judy hooking up with Mickey, and seeks refuge in a closet.

Noting Robin's frustrations over Patrice and Barney dating, the gang claims that Barney has "over-corrected"; dating warm, nurturing Patrice in comparison to his ex-fiance Quinn, a stripper whom he never really trusted. Robin says that Barney is just using Patrice to compensate for not trying to pursue her. Still in love with Barney, she tries to convince Patrice of his real intentions, but when it fails, she breaks into his apartment to steal a copy of the Playbook and show it to her. While trying to find it, she scrambles to hide in Barney's bedroom closet as he arrives home. She calls Ted and asks him to distract Barney for her to escape.

Ted, angry at the gang for failing to return anything they borrowed from him over the years, helps out as Robin finally uncovers the Playbook. When Barney returns to the apartment to wait for Patrice in setting up a Christmas tree, Robin and Ted hide. Robin calls up Lily for help only to discover she is in a nearby closet; Lily needed a place to privately use her breast pumps as an escape from her crowded apartment. Robin leaves the Playbook on the bed for Patrice to see. While Patrice and Barney argue at the terrace, Robin, Lily, and Ted hide in another closet – just in time to see Barney confess to Patrice that he wants to change, starting by burning the Playbook. When they leave, Ted declares to never again lend the gang anything because they do not respect him, and gets back his red cowboy boots and a label maker. He also tries to reclaim his mini-cooler but reneges upon learning that Lily spilt her breast milk over it.

Lily returns to the apartment, only to vomit after learning from Marshall about their parents hooking up. Barney later consoles them at the bar, saying that people can change. Still unconvinced about Barney and Patrice, Robin asks Marshall, Lily, and Ted to hold an intervention for Barney – but the three hold it instead for her. Lily and Marshall tell Mickey and Judy that it is okay for them to date, but when the parents admit just wanting to have sex, Marshall and Lily throw up into Ted's mini-cooler.

== Critical reception ==
Donna Bowman of the A.V. Club gave the episode a C+. She says that the episode executes its concept "half-heartedly" and its "emotional arc ... is missing in action". She also notes that she continues to "object to the shallowness of the way [Robin obsessing over Barney's relationship with Patrice is] presented". Despite this, she also notes that Barney's reaction when Ted tells him that Hugh Hefner is in his building's lobby "should go on a season eight highlight reel" and that the frequent mentions of items borrowed from Ted is "a reliably amusing running gag".

Michael Arbeiter of Hollywood.com writes that the main characters are "sociopaths stuck in a carbonite of suspended adolescence" and "nut jobs [who] have extensive time to concoct harebrained schemes." He speculates that the show's creators are suffering from a "psychologically paralyzing insomnia that stunts the bounds of good judgment." He concludes that all of the main characters "are just kind of... horrible."

Ethan Alter of Television Without Pity gave the episode a D. He says that with this episode "the writers continue Robin's ongoing character assassination." He criticizes Lily's reluctance to let Marshall's mother stay with them saying she has "little room in her two-sizes-too-small heart for a still-grieving widow." He asks rhetorically, "could the hostility that now pervades this group be any thicker?" Overall, he expresses the hope that viewers have "wised up and abandoned HIMYM until May’s series finale."

Max Nicholson of IGN gave the episode a score of 7.9/10 (Good), saying overall that it "delivered one of the best arcs of the season, along with a less than stellar B story for Marshall." He describes the characters being trapped in various closets as "the real highlight of this arc." He also commented that the episode "featured some great sight comedy" and the references to Ted's borrowed belongings was "one of the funniest of the season." However, he also noted that Marshall's story was "the only real weak link", calling it "pretty obvious and predictable" and "totally creepy."

Alan Sepinwall of Hitfix.com said the episode was "trapped between the smart, honest show it used to be and the cartoonish show it is now that's willing to sell out any character or emotion in search of a laugh." He comments that "Patrice... exists only for that horrible running gag where Robin shrieks at her — which has never been funny." He added that "The other subplots... weren't especially funny."

Bill Kuchman of TV.com said the episode shows that the series "not only still has some life left in it, but that the show also still has a few tricks up its sleeve." He says, "some of HIMYM's best episodes have been the ones that dealt in misdirection" and adds "I have a hunch that 'The Over-Correction' was one of these episodes."
