= Something Old =

- How I Met Your Mother episode
- Ted consoles Robin after she doesn't find her locket.
- Episode no.: Season 8 Episode 23
- Directed by: Pamela Fryman
- Written by: Carter Bays; Craig Thomas
- Original air date: May 6, 2013

Guest appearance
- Ray Wise as Robin Scherbatsky Sr.

Episode chronology
← Previous "The Bro Mitzvah"	Next → "Something New"
- How I Met Your Mother season 8

"Something Old" is the 23rd episode of the eighth season of the CBS sitcom How I Met Your Mother, and the 183rd episode overall.

== Plot ==
In 1994, Robin and her father visited New York (on what Robin Sr. called a 'father-son bonding trip') with Robin determined to move to the city one day. While in Central Park, Robin buried a locket intending to return for it before her wedding so it could be her "something old". Visiting the park with her father again in 2013, she intends for the two to find the locket, only for Robin Sr. to quickly leave to join Barney (who he has bonded with to the point of nicknaming him 'B-Dog') for a round of lasertag. The two initially get along well against the children also playing, but soon get into an argument and organize the children into their own teams to take each other on. After a hard-fought battle, the two reconcile and happily return to shooting the other kids.

While Robin searches for her locket, Lily and Marshall prepare for their "something new" by packing up for their move to Italy. However, since neither can bring themselves to leave anything behind, they call in Ted (who believes himself to be an expert after travelling around Mexico for two weeks with only a fanny pack) to help decide what goes with them and what goes in the "Bermuda Triangle". Ted agrees to help despite having an important meeting, but he proves to be more of a hindrance, as he packs seemingly useless stuff including an old and leaking bean-bag chair to Italy while intending to leave more valuable things such as an Italy guide book in the Triangle. Eventually, Marshall and Lily call Ted out on this but when he refuses to relent, they send him out to buy fanny packs. On his return, he finds Marshall and Lily about to leave the bean-bag in the Triangle and begs them to keep it, sitting down in it and refusing to move even if it means missing the meeting. He admits the chair means a lot to him as it was the first piece of furniture they bought after moving into the apartment. When he admits his worry that their friendship will deteriorate if the two are not around, Marshall and Lily promise that it will not happen. They decide to leave Ted alone, and after a few seconds' thought about holding on to the past, Ted hails a cab and later sees that the bag is gone. He later gets a picture message from Marshall and Lily revealing that they have reclaimed the bean-bag chair, however Ted encourages them to get rid of it, much to their relief.

Robin discovers that the locket is not where she thought she buried it, and frantically digs up several holes in a fruitless attempt to find it. She calls Barney in the middle of his game but when he asks if it is important, she just responds that it is "stupid" and Barney goes right back to playing. She calls Ted, who is on the way to his meeting, and gives the same response when he asks if she has something important. Despite this, Ted turns up at Central Park to help Robin dig and she admits her fears regarding marrying Barney, particularly because Ted implicitly knew she needed help and Barney did not. When Robin does find the locket box, she thinks finding it is a sign she should push through with the wedding – and when the box turns up empty, she laments about Barney not being meant for her, further thinking that a fresh downpour is indeed a sign. Ted reminds Robin that she is usually skeptical of this sort of thing and maybe signs do not exist; but then Robin takes Ted's hand, as the storm begins to settle down.

== Production ==
The episode incorrectly associated mariachi with Spain. After fans complained, reruns were modified to depict Ted as having traveled to Mexico instead.

== Critical reception ==
Donna Bowman of The A.V. Club gave the episode a B.

Max Nicholson of IGN scored the episode 7, stating that the episode featured a strong comedic A story, a weak B story and an intriguing but mostly hollow end.
