= The Time Travelers (How I Met Your Mother) =

- How I Met Your Mother episode
- Episode no.: Season 8 Episode 20
- Directed by: Pamela Fryman
- Written by: Carter Bays; Craig Thomas
- Original air date: March 25, 2013

Guest appearances
- Jayma Mays as Coat-Check Girl; Joe Nieves as Carl the Bartender; Lyndsy Fonseca as Ted's Daughter; David Henrie as Ted's Son; Lou Ferrigno Jr. as Louis

Episode chronology
← Previous "The Fortress"	Next → "Romeward Bound"
- How I Met Your Mother season 8

"The Time Travelers" is the 20th episode of the eighth season of the CBS sitcom How I Met Your Mother, and the 180th episode overall.

== Plot ==
At MacLaren's, in April 2013, Ted passes up Barney's invitation to watch Robots Versus Wrestlers: Legends because he has to prepare for class. Barney claims he will regret this in 20 years, and Ted is then shocked when likenesses of Barney and Ted from 2033 appear and try to convince him. A Ted from 20 hours in the future warns present Ted that he will enjoy the event at the expense of a massive hangover and a sprained wrist. Present Ted is convinced about going, but a Barney from 20 minutes in the future holds back the group long enough to see a woman enter the bar; the coat-check girl, whom Ted had not seen for seven years. Ted prepares to talk to her, but is stopped by her future versions—one who grew sick of Ted and a version very much obsessed with him. They inform Ted the relationship is doomed, mainly due to his previous failed relationships, and Ted lets the woman walk out of the bar.

Meanwhile, Marshall brags about a fancy cocktail drink he had invented called the Minnesota Tidal Wave, and attempts to order one at the bar. He is shocked when Carl the Bartender calls it The Robin Scherbatsky; it is named in her honor because she had ordered it several times. Marshall is annoyed and challenges Robin to a dance-off, but Lily forbids it due to his worsening dancer's hip. Marshall attempts to get back at Robin by writing her name and phone number in a men's bathroom stall, but Robin promptly goes in to erase it. She then heads into the girls' bathroom, implying she has written Marshall's number in there. Nervous about entering the ladies' room, Marshall eventually goes in to find a long message by Robin stating the adverse treatment she endured from her father—but it's a prank to force Marshall to hide in a stall when a woman enters. Marshall attempts to leave, scaring women from the bathroom out and humiliating himself. Lily lets Marshall and Robin dance off.

Ted returns to Barney, who reveals that the entire cocktail story happened in 2008, and Ted is actually sitting in the bar alone, with Barney and their future selves being a figment of his imagination, and that Ted relived the story to get rid of his loneliness; his friends were too busy to go to Robots Vs. Wrestlers, and Ted is preparing to head to the event alone (echoing "Robots Versus Wrestlers", in which Barney is upset because he feels the group is growing apart). Future Ted states if he could relive the events of that night, he would have instead visited his apartment, his friends, and most importantly, the mother (who was living several blocks away at the time). Future Ted imagines himself running through the streets before knocking on the mother's apartment door. Ted introduces himself, telling her how much he loves her, that they will meet in 45 days, and he would give anything to spend that extra time with her before getting punched in the face by her boyfriend.

Ted snaps back to reality, standing outside MacLaren's. He puts the ticket in his pocket and then walks home.

The episode concludes on a bittersweet note with Ted, imaginary Barney, and the imaginary future versions of themselves at MacLaren's singing an a cappella version of Billy Joel's "The Longest Time".

== Critical reception ==
Donna Bowman of The A.V. Club gave the episode a B+.

TV.com's Bill Kuchman praised Bob Saget's narration and added that the episode's climax stands up there with some of the show's finest moments.

Max Nicholson of IGN said the episode was very bizarre but had a grounded storyline. He noted that the time-traveler plot device may have been lifted off Felicity, and in the end he gave the episode an 8.7 out of 10.

Kevin Olsta of Starpulse said Bays and Thomas did well with writing the episode.

Sandra Gonzalez of Entertainment Weekly said the episode tackled time travel for the first time since the season 5 episode "The Window", but it can be one of the show's best.
