= The Bro Mitzvah =

- How I Met Your Mother episode
- Episode no.: Season 8 Episode 22
- Directed by: Pamela Fryman
- Written by: Chris Harris
- Original air date: April 29, 2013

Guest appearances
- Becki Newton as Quinn; Frances Conroy as Loretta Stinson; Ralph Macchio as himself; William Zabka as Clown / himself; Calvin Jung as Chinese Mobster

Episode chronology
← Previous "Romeward Bound"	Next → "Something Old"
- How I Met Your Mother season 8

"The Bro Mitzvah" is the 22nd episode of the eighth season of the CBS sitcom How I Met Your Mother, and the 182nd episode overall.

== Plot ==
The episode opens with Barney sitting in despair on the sidewalk, as Future Ted tells the story of the night his life fell apart. Six hours earlier, Robin asked Barney to deliver a $5,000 deposit to the wedding caterer and join her in a dinner with his mother Loretta. Ted and Marshall abduct Barney for a surprise bachelor party.

Barney calls Robin to tell her he will not be making it to dinner and Loretta is already there so it is too late to cancel much to Robin's dismay. Reaching a cheap hotel near Atlantic City, Ted and Marshall explain that they remember what Barney requested for his bachelor party (which he has dubbed the 'Bro Mitzvah') from when he was engaged to Quinn. However, they manage to get everything wrong and end up bringing a DVD of An Inconvenient Truth (for Barney's requirement of "Fear for our Lives") and a clown who does balloon animals (for "Mind-blowing Entertainment"). They also invite Ralph Macchio for when Barney stated he wanted to meet the hero of The Karate Kid, only to be reminded that he considers Johnny Lawrence as the hero of the film. Lily starts flirting with Macchio and Barney refuses to get along with him despite expressing the same behavior.

Barney is stunned to learn that the stripper hired is actually Quinn, who claims to have been despondent after they broke up and is furious that Barney is engaged again. She agrees to put on a show for everyone except Barney, who is forced to sit in the hotel bathroom taking angry calls from Robin, who is having a terrible time with Loretta. Afterwards, he decides to call it a night and join Robin, but on the ride back with Ted, Marshall, Lily, Quinn, Ralph and the clown, he is reminded of the many casinos in the city and turns back where he quickly gambles away the $5,000. In an attempt to recoup his losses, he gambles away Marshall as collateral for $80,000. Heading home, he admits to everyone what he did and Ted angrily ends his friendship with him. He runs into a furious Robin who, upon seeing Quinn and realizing she was the stripper, breaks up with him.

As a devastated Barney collapses onto the sidewalk (as per the opening scene), Robin gets out-of-sight and calls Ted to tell him everything is on schedule, revealing the entire evening to be a hoax. Three weeks earlier, the gang brainstormed for ideas but when Marshall notes they will never be able to give a guy like Barney the best night of his life, Robin, whom as his fiancée Barney dismissed as incapable of organizing bachelor parties, proposes giving him the worst. Having arranged everything with Quinn, Loretta, Ralph and the casino bosses, the entire evening has been a perfect set-up to make Barney think his life was ruined.

Back on the sidewalk, the casino mobsters arrive and seemingly cut off Marshall's hand before dragging Barney inside. When he reaches his apartment, he finds everyone waiting for him. When they come clean about the plan, Barney is amazed at its complexity, and even more so when he learns that Robin planned it all. The plan appears to satisfy all his requests for a "Bro Mitzvah", except for including the hero of The Karate Kid. However, Barney gets the biggest surprise when the clown reveals he is actually William Zabka, wearing a Cobra Kai uniform underneath his clown costume. Barney hugs his hero in happiness.

== Critical reception ==
Entertainment Weekly's Sandra Gonzalez gave the episode a positive review, and wrote that it "was one of [her] favorite just-for-fun surprises they’ve delivered in years".

Donna Bowman of The A.V. Club gave the episode a B+ stating that while this is one of the show's better entries, what stopped it from being truly great was that the evening felt like a ruse right from the beginning.

Angel Cohn of Television Without Pity gave the episode a B−, praising the episode for giving Robin the chance to show her deviousness, the performance by Ralph Macchio and having the entire cast involved in the main plot.

Max Nicholson of IGN scored the episode 7.8, stating that while he enjoyed the majority of the episode (in particular, the final twist regarding the clown's identity), it suffered from the Robin/Loretta dinner scenes (stating that they felt hammy and were unnecessary, especially considering they never really happened) and the flirting between Lily and Ralph.
