= Band or DJ? =

- How I Met Your Mother episode
- Episode no.: Season 8 Episode 13
- Directed by: Pamela Fryman
- Written by: Carter Bays; Craig Thomas
- Original air date: January 14, 2013

Guest appearances
- Rachel Bilson as Cindy; Kaylee DeFer as Casey; Ray Wise as Robin Scherbatsky, Sr.

Episode chronology
← Previous "The Final Page – Part 2"	Next → "Ring Up!"
- How I Met Your Mother season 8

"Band or DJ?" is the 13th episode of the eighth season of the CBS sitcom How I Met Your Mother, and the 173rd episode overall.

== Plot ==
In 2013, Robin wants Barney to ask her father, Robin Sr, for his blessing on their wedding. They are surprised to find that her formerly strict father has taken a turn for the cool, wearing Hawaiian shirts, offering hugs instead of a formal handshake, and keeping himself up-to-date on Facebook. Despite his brighter demeanor, Robin Sr. nonetheless turns down Barney's request to marry Robin. While Barney attempts to win over Robin Sr., Robin notes her father's repeated insistence to add him on her Facebook friends list and finally accepts the friend request. She is bitterly disappointed to learn that her father got remarried to his girlfriend Carol without telling her (despite proudly proclaiming it on his page). Because of the elder Scherbatsky's lack of involvement in her life, Robin declares that she will marry Barney without his permission and will not invite him to the wedding. Barney later helps the two reconcile and Robin Sr agrees to her request to share a dance with her at the reception.

Meanwhile, Ted and Lily fight over whether to hire a band or a DJ for the wedding—Ted is determined to hire a DJ and blocks all of Lily's attempts to hire a band requested by Robin. With Marshall taking care of a constipated baby Marvin, Lily forces Ted to admit his unhappiness towards Robin and Barney being engaged by revealing a terrible secret of her own: sometimes she wishes she never became a mother. Although she loves Marvin and being his mother, she feels exhausted and unhappy that she was unable to fulfill her dreams as an artist. Ted finally admits hating the idea of Robin marrying Barney and feels extremely hurt, even though he is happy for both of them. Lily thinks that both she and Ted need to accept the pain in their lives and move on; Ted agrees to hire a wedding band.

Future Ted recollects meeting his ex-girlfriend Cindy and her wife, Casey, a week before the wedding and he revealed how the band Robin picked canceled at the last minute. Upon hearing the news, Cindy immediately suggests a replacement: her ex-roommate's band is available for the wedding since they were dropped from their gig. Future Ted goes on to tell his children that if Robin and Barney had let him hire a DJ, he would have never met their mother.

== Critical reception ==
Donna Bowman of the A.V. Club gave the episode a B+. She says that "Marshall and Lily’s storylines tend to be off in their own separate world—distractingly so" but then remarks that in this episode Ted and Lily's predicaments are united by the theme of "longing for the roads we did not take, no matter how rewarding the one we did take turns out to be".

Michael Arbeiter of Hollywood.com writes that Lily's " 'Holy cow!' revelation" about her "resentment of her new motherhood and sporadic desire to run out on Marshall and Baby Marvin ... isn't really worth the muster of its musical sting." About Ted's feelings for Robin he says "none of this is anything we haven't seen before."

Max Nicholson of IGN gave the episode a score of 7.0/10 (Good). He writes that "Robin Sr.'s scenes with Barney weren't particularly funny" but "his scenes with Robin were a bit more compelling" and "overall, this storyline felt pretty weak comedically." He comments that the story of Marvin's constipation "wasn't much more than one, long poop joke, the story did feature a fairly amusing 'whiz-bang' conclusion." He also notes that "the Ted not being over Robin thing is now officially tiresome." More positively, he writes that "it was really Lily's confession to Ted that stood out" and "it was nice that Lily was given a substantial arc."

Angel Cohn of Television Without Pity gave the episode a C. Cohn wrote that the episode demonstrates that the show is "going to beat this Ted loves Robin nonsense into the damned ground now." After Robin decides that her father's permission to marry is not important, Cohn comments that "we're not sure why it really was in the first place given her strained relationship with the man." Cohn also comments that it would have been better for Jason Segel to "have made Muppets 2 instead of sticking it out with this show another year."
