= Twelve Horny Women =

- How I Met Your Mother episode
- Episode no.: Season 8 Episode 8
- Directed by: Pamela Fryman
- Written by: Chris Romano; Eric Falconer
- Original air date: November 26, 2012

Guest appearances
- Joe Manganiello as Brad Morris; David Burtka as Scooter; Jake Elliott as 14-year-old Marvin; Dennis Haskins as Judge #2; Joe Lo Truglio as Mr. Honeywell

Episode chronology
← Previous "The Stamp Tramp"	Next → "Lobster Crawl"
- How I Met Your Mother season 8

"Twelve Horny Women" is the eighth episode of the eighth season of the CBS sitcom How I Met Your Mother, and the 168th episode overall.

== Plot ==
The New York State Judiciary Committee convenes to question Marshall about his conduct during the previous week's trial against Gruber Pharmaceuticals over its alleged contamination of Frog Lake. Marshall begins to narrate what happened.

At the trial, Marshall is angry that Brad, his close friend, turned on him, but decides to hold his ground over the course of the hearing. While Marshall does his best to explain his camp's position on the case (including showing a bird from the lake suffering from acute dermatitis), Brad tries a different approach. He talks while using his muscular frame in several ways to try winning over the all-women jury and even the judge. He also questions a quack doctor and exhibits a video that aims to prove that Frog Lake was safe (mostly footage of him dipping in the water while flexing his body before the camera). However, upon seeing the video, Marshall calls Brad to the witness stand and asks him to unbutton his shirt; the jurors are left aghast at seeing Brad's chest having signs of acute dermatitis as a result of his frolicking in the lake. The judge finds Gruber Pharmaceuticals guilty of the contamination, but only orders that it pay $25,000 in damages instead of the original $25-million claim.

Sulking at MacLaren's over the sudden turn of events, a bitter Marshall tells Brad that he cannot forgive him for siding with Gruber. Brad reconciles with him by saying that he has left the company and joined Marshall's firm to try using his courtroom skills to save the world. He also says that the judge who oversaw the trial was bad and he knew Marshall can do better. At this point it is revealed that Marshall went before the state judiciary committee to apply for a job as a judge. The panel asks for time to deliberate on the matter.

Meanwhile, Ted, Barney, Lily and Robin have been invited to witness the hearing. At MacLaren's and later in the courthouse, the group talk about their past as juvenile delinquents and try to argue who had the nastiest reputation. Lily brings up the time she was a feared neighborhood bully in 1994, (referencing Omar Little) and even slapped a police officer who caught her and Scooter drinking alcohol. Ted says he was booked on numerous charges by the Cleveland Police Department. Robin claims she trashed a Manitoba inn during a Robin Sparkles road tour. Barney claims that his own exploits have amassed him a large rap sheet. A bailiff recognizes Barney and recalls that he was part of a popular magician's club, which forces everybody else to admit the truth: Robin was actually commended by the inn management for being an orderly guest and Ted was pilloried at a Renaissance fair. When the gang still doubts Lily's story, they all walk down the street with Marshall after the trial – and see all bystanders scamper away at seeing her, proving that Lily's story is true.

Since the kiss after going to Mouth Beach, Barney and Robin decide to forget what happened. Later, Barney tells Robin that he is done with pursuing her and will concentrate instead on more women. As Barney leaves to pick up another woman, Robin thinks about what he said and suddenly says, "Huh."

== Critical reception ==
Donna Bowman of the A.V. Club gave the episode a B. About the main plot of Marshal's trial she wrote that "the payoff was beautiful" and the brief mention of the Barney–Robin relationship was "a beautiful thing", but she was "almost actively annoyed by the perfunctory B-story."

Michael Arbeiter of Hollywood.com described how "Brad flexes his bicep and every woman in the room melts into a stammering puddle" as "cheap, thoughtless, idiotic, and lazy" and says that "it'd be downright offensive if it weren't so... stupid." He also wondered if "the writers even care about [Barney and Robin] anymore."

Max Nicholson of IGN gave the episode a score of 7.2/10 (Good), saying that overall it "wasn't particularly laugh-out-loud funny, but it was still a nice watch." He says the main plot "delivered a rather entertaining court sesh for Marshall." He also wrote that although Brad's "wooing of the all-female jury wasn't especially hilarious, his Frog Lake promo video did provide a few chuckles" and "his rapid-fire word abbreviations were pretty clever." He also described the main subplot as "fun" with "some entertaining flashbacks."

Angel Cohn of Television Without Pity gave the episode a C, saying that the episode was "nearly entirely pointless" and refers to the subplot as "RIDICULOUSLY stupid". Cohn also calls the mentions of the state of Barney and Robin's relationship "just more filler and padding leading up to the eventual wedding."
