= Ellen D. Williams =

American actress

- Occupation: Actress/Writer

Ellen D. Williams is an American theatre and television actress.

== Life and career ==
In 2011, Williams was cast and is best known for her role in How I Met Your Mother, portraying Patrice. Since then she has appeared in such shows as The Mindy Project, Life in Pieces, Criminal Minds, The Real O'Neals, Pitch, Kevin from Work, to name a few. In 2016, Williams started recurring opposite Zach Galifianakis in the FX show Baskets, as Nicole Baskets.

In 2016, Williams starred opposite Ginger Gonzaga and Jason Ritter in Gonzaga's short film, Your Day.

Williams is an actress who has appeared in numerous theatre productions in the Los Angeles and Seattle areas. Working with such companies in Los Angeles as Playwrights Arena at LATC, East West Players, South Coast Repertory, LoudRMouth, The Garage Theatre Company, to name a few. She garnered a "Leading Female Performance" nomination from LA Weekly in 2009 for her role as Ruby in Boni B. Alvarez's play Ruby, Tragically Rotund.

== Personal life ==
Her mother is of Filipino, Chinese, and Spanish descent, and her father is of English, Irish, Scottish descent. Williams is openly gay.

== Filmography ==
Film
Year	Title	Role	Notes
2004	When a Telemarketer Calls	Sandy Gibb	Short
2005	Monster In My Pants	Mary Roundfirmenhigh	Short
2008	Brown Soup Thing	Cousin Ellen	
2012	Salesgirl	Donna	post-production

Television
Year	Title	Role	Notes
2011–14	How I Met Your Mother	Patrice	Season 7–9 (Recurring; 12 episodes)
2015	Kevin from Work	Liz	Season 1 (1 Episode)
2016	Baskets	Nicole Baskets	Season 1–3 (Recurring; 7 episodes)
2016	Pitch	Producer	Season 1 (Episode 2)
2016	Criminal Minds	M.E. Dawn Durboraw	Season 12 (Episode 3)
2016	The Real O'Neals	Joyce	Season 2 (Episode 7)
2017	The Mindy Project	Dr. Irene Lee	Season 5 (Episode 12)
2017	You're the Worst	Casting Associate	Season 3 (Episode 10)
2017	Brooklyn Nine-Nine	Helgata	Season 5 (Episode 6)
2018	Life in Pieces	Shelley	Season 3 (Episode 18)
2019	Superstore	Jasmine	Season 4 (Episode 10)
2019	Bless This Mess	Dr. Rachel Kappler	Season 1 (Episode 4)
2022	Barry	Customer	Season 3 (Episode 6)
