= List of Minder episodes =

This episode list gives brief descriptions and some other details of the episodes of the ITV television series Minder, set in contemporary London.

The earliest episodes focus on Terry McCann (Dennis Waterman), a former professional boxer who has served time in jail and is determined not to return there. He finds himself in the orbit of Arthur Daley (George Cole), a middle-aged car salesman and self-described entrepreneur working on the edge of (and often beyond) the law in pursuit of a quick profit. Terry works for Arthur as an assistant/bodyguard (known as a 'minder') and is often loaned by Arthur to work for others in a similar capacity. Over the course of the first three series, the focus of the show shifts so that the ever-scheming Arthur moves from being a supporting character to co-lead with Terry.

Series 1–7 (first broadcast from 1979 to 1985, then in 1989) feature both Terry and Arthur. Two TV films were also made between series 6 and 7, broadcast on Christmas Day 1985 and Boxing Day 1988. Terry was written out of the show after series 7.

Series 8–10 (first broadcast in 1991, 1993 and 1994) focus on Arthur Daley, older but no wiser, and his nephew Ray Daley (Gary Webster) as his new minder/assistant.

Series 11 (first broadcast in 2009 on Channel 5) was a short-lived revival of the programme with a completely new cast.

Following the deaths of George Cole in 2015, Glynn Edwards in 2018 and Dennis Waterman in 2022, Gary Webster and Patrick Malahide are the two surviving cast members.

== Series overview ==
| Series | Episodes | Originally released | |
| Series | Episodes | First released | Last released |
|---|---|---|---|
| 1 | 11 | 29 October 1979 | 21 January 1980 |
| 2 | 13 | 11 September 1980 | 18 December 1980 |
| 3 | 13 | 13 January 1982 | 7 April 1982 |
| 4 | 12 | 26 December 1983 | 21 March 1984 |
| 5 | 9 | 5 September 1984 | 26 December 1984 |
| 6 | 7 | 4 September 1985 | 25 December 1985 |
| 7 | 7 | 26 December 1988 | 6 February 1989 |
| 8 | 13 | 5 September 1991 | 25 December 1991 |
| 9 | 13 | 7 January 1993 | 1 April 1993 |
| 10 | 10 | 6 January 1994 | 10 March 1994 |
| 11 | 6 | 4 February 2009 | 11 March 2009 |

=== Series 1 (1979–80) ===
- Broadcast: 29 October 1979 – 21 January 1980 (ITV)
- Regular cast: Dennis Waterman as Terry McCann, George Cole as Arthur Daley, Glynn Edwards as Dave Harris

| No. in series | Title | Original release date |
|---|---|---|
| 1 | "Gunfight at the OK Laundrette" | 29 October 1979 |
Terry is caught up in an armed robbery at a laundrette owned by gangster-turned-successful businessman Alfie Cavallo. The robbery goes wrong, and all present are held at gunpoint. Alfie is shot and wounded. As police try to talk them into releasing the hostages, Terry tries to persuade the gunman to give himself up while he has a chance. After a tense night, the gunman does so, and Terry becomes a hero. Meanwhile, Arthur is trying to generate publicity for Terry's actions. (The episode title spoofs the 1957 film Gunfight at the OK Corral.) Guest stars: Dave King as Alfie Cavallo, Hilary Mason as Mrs. Mayhew, Donald Burton as Chief Superintendent, Arnold Diamond as Bernie
| 2 | "Bury My Half at Waltham Green" | 5 November 1979 |
Terry guards Albert Stubbs, a newly released bank robber, until he can retrieve the stolen money he has buried. Terry discovers that he's actually lumbered with George Wilson, a look-alike decoy, to divert attention from the "real" Stubbs, who is being housed at Arthur's flat. Stubbs' former partners, including Rose Mellors, are also after the cash. When it's dug up, it's found to be out of date and unusable. (The episode title spoofs the 1970 book Bury My Heart at Wounded Knee.) Guest stars: Ann Lynn as Rose Mellors, Kenneth Cope as Stubbs, Nicky Henson as George, Tony Selby as Jacko
| 3 | "The Smaller They Are" | 12 November 1979 |
Scotch Harry, a sneak thief, grabs an attache case full of hundred-dollar bills, which prove to be counterfeit. He finds himself out of his depth, tangling with international currency smugglers who are prepared to be violent. Arthur and Terry help to extricate him from his precarious situation. DC Rycott is also interested in Harry's activities. (The episode title spoofs the proverb "The bigger they are, the harder they fall".) Guest stars: Phil McCall as Scotch Harry, David Jackson as Big Stan, George Tovey as Pub Landlord, Hilary Ryan as Airline Receptionist
| 4 | "A Tethered Goat" | 19 November 1979 |
Terry guards a visiting Lebanese businessman/politician at a West Kensington flat. Having been assured it is a simple job, he finds that the visitor has been set up for a politically motivated assassination. Despite Arthur's well-meaning interference, Terry fights off a group of violent killers and manages to keep him safe. The two then help the visitor to leave the country, steering clear of police and avoiding a diplomatic incident. Guest stars: Lee Montague as Bassam Sayin, Kenneth Griffith as Dai Llewellyn, Michael Sheard as Elliot, Nadim Sawalha as Sardi, Patrick Jordan as Police Inspector, Ian Collier as 1st Police Sergeant, David Millett as 2nd Police Sergeant
| 5 | "The Bounty Hunter" | 26 November 1979 |
Terry and Arthur help a young widow who has been swindled out of her life savings in a Majorcan property scheme run by Freddie Fenton, a crooked businessman. She gets her money back, but only after Des and Terry hijack Fenton's Rolls-Royce and blackmail him. Guest stars: Derek Jacobi as Freddie Fenton, June Ritchie as Jo Williams, George Layton as Des, James Aubrey as Graham Hurst, Tony Steedman as Ralph Hurst, Christopher Biggins as Harold, Keith Alexander as Andy.
| 6 | "Aces High – and Sometimes Very Low" | 3 December 1979 |
After being banned by several casinos for being too successful, and subsequently mugged, professional gambler and poker player Maurice Michaelson participates for revenge in an illegal high-stakes card game, with Terry minding him. The game is rigged, but Maurice manages to win anyway – with a spot of cheating. (The episode title spoofs the 1976 film Aces High.) Guest stars: Anthony Valentine as Maurice, Marina Sirtis as Stella, Kevork Malikyan as Chris, Marc Zuber as Nick, David Baron as Casino Manager
| 7 | "The Bengal Tiger" | 10 December 1979 |
Terry and Arthur are drawn into the problems of newspaper shop owner Mr. Mukerjee, whose daughter Indira has been promised in arranged marriages to several older wealthy Indian businessmen in return for dowry payments. However, she has other ideas – and the potential bridegrooms want their money back, or else. Guest stars: Saeed Jaffrey as Mukerjee, Graham Stark as Car owner, Ahmed Khalil as Aslam, Roy Evans as Elderly Man, Eamonn Boyce as barman, Clive Hornby as Norman Gibbons, Mike Grady as Kev, Shireen Anwar as Indira, Dennis Gimes as thug
| 8 | "Come in T-64, Your Time Is Ticking Away" | 17 December 1979 |
Terry is persuaded to go undercover as a driver (in a clapped-out Austin A60 Cambridge) to find out who is sabotaging the minicab firm Arthur co-owns. He eventually discovers that Arthur's minority partner wants out, and is paying for the sabotage so that he can buy Arthur's share cheaply and sell the land for a supermarket. Guest stars: Alfred Burke as Kevin, Daphne Anderson as Katie, George Layton as Des, Oscar James as Dave, W. Morgan Sheppard as John, Eric Mason as Paddy, Diana Malin as Debbie
| 9 | "Monday Night Fever" | 7 January 1980 |
Arthur falls heavily for Sharon, a glamorous would-be nightclub singer and offers to manage her career, despite her terrible voice. Chris, the club owner, who's been paid by Arthur to help launch her career with massive publicity, fails to come good. Arthur engages Vic Piner, a violent thug, to retrieve the money and deliver retribution. However, Terry negotiates with Chris, to avoid any violence. (The episode title spoofs the 1977 film Saturday Night Fever.) Guest stars: Sheila White as Sharon Nightingale, Peter Blake as Barry, Eric Deacon as Chris Lambert, Brian Croucher as Big John, Anthony Heaton as Vic Piner, Tommy Wright as Henry Piner, Michael Melia as Freddie, Gennie Nevinson as Penny
| 10 | "The Dessert Song" | 14 January 1980 |
Terry and Arthur assist Charlie, a Greek Cypriot newly arrived in London, but learn that he has come with a rifle in order to kill Omar, the Turkish Cypriot man he believes killed his brother in Cyprus. Terry minds the restaurant run by Charlie's cousin Christina, and finds himself in the middle of a potential "honour killing". (The episode title spoofs the 1953 film The Desert Song.) Guest stars: Peter Bland as Charlie, Diane Keen as Christina Kostos, Daniel Hill as Johnny, Godfrey James as Omar, Michael Angelis as Nick, Vic Tablian as Chef
| 11 | "You Gotta Have Friends" | 21 January 1980 |
"Pretty Billy" Gilpin turns up at Arthur's home, badly injured, and begging for assistance. Terry drives him to where he wants to go, but Billy is later found drowned. It emerges that he was involved in a lucrative racket selling fake bearer bonds, but trying to rip off his partner, successful and violent gangster Bobby Altman. He was also having an affair with Lady Ingrave. Altman suspects Arthur's involvement, and kidnaps him to force him to hand over the bonds. Terry obtains the bonds from Lady Ingrave and rescues Arthur. Guest stars: George Baker as Altman, Roy Kinnear as "Big Kev" Whaley, David Buck as Billy, Deborah Grant as Lady Ingrave, Brian Hall as Alan, Allan Surtees as D.I. Barnett, Prentis Hancock as Stuart

=== Series 2 (1980) ===
- First broadcast: 11 September – 18 December 1980 (ITV)
- Regular cast: Dennis Waterman as Terry McCann, George Cole as Arthur Daley, Glynn Edwards as Dave Harris

| No. in series | Title | Original release date |
|---|---|---|
| 1 | "National Pelmet" | 11 September 1980 |
Arthur persuades Terry to guard "Pelmet", a racehorse, at stables near Brighton. Terry initially refuses, but changes his mind when he meets Jocelyn, the attractive female jockey, although it's Rita, the stable girl, who makes passes at him. Attempts at sabotage are foiled, and at the racecourse Terry encounters and catches the perpetrator: Rita's ex-husband, a religious maniac who is stalking her. (The episode title spoofs the 1944 film National Velvet.) Guest stars: Liza Goddard as Jocelyn Maxwell-Saunders, Jane Carr as Rita, Jim Norton as O'Brady, Jeremy Young as Everett
| 2 | "Whose Wife is it Anyway?" | 18 September 1980 |
Terry guards an antique shop owned by Alex, a friend of Arthur, after two men demand protection money. He isn't keen on the job as he has to share a flat with Jim, a gay man, Alex's partner. He soon discovers that the story of the protection racket is a fabrication, that Alex is also gay, and that his ex-wife Gloria set up the "accident" that has put Alex in hospital. (The episode title spoofs the 1972 television play Whose Life is it Anyway?.) Guest stars: Alun Lewis as Jim, David Daker as Alex, John Forgeham as George, Charles Pemberton as Policeman
| 3 | "You Lose Some, You Win Some" | 25 September 1980 |
Maurice Michaelson (previously seen in Series 1), a professional gambler, is running a roulette syndicate at a casino, taking a percentage of the profits. However, the casino owners are watching him and try to break up the syndicate. The syndicate members end up moving into Terry's flat for safety, although he had planned to spend time with his girlfriend Penny. To top it all, Maurice's wife Maureen disappears, and he suspects the casino owner of kidnapping her. Guest stars: Anthony Valentine as Maurice, Gennie Nevinson as Penny, Lesley Joseph as Maureen, Lynda Baron as Sadie, Ronald Leigh-Hunt as Major Lampson, Leslie Schofield as Parsons
| 4 | "Don't Tell Them Willie Boy was Here" | 9 October 1980 |
Retired champion boxer Willie Reynolds, the "Mersey Mouth", returns to London from Jamaica for a comeback fight, but gets hit with a demand for payment of back taxes. He doesn't take the fight very seriously, but Terry learns that Barney, his trainer, is planning to fix the fight. Terry decides to take over Willie's training, and Willie wins the fight, much to Barney's anger. Arthur also makes some money. (The episode title spoofs the 1969 film Tell Them Willie Boy Is Here.) Guest stars: Paul Barber as Willie Reynolds, Alfred Marks as Barney Mather, Jackie Collins as herself, Ronnie Stevens as TV host, Vicki Michelle as Sarah Jane, Tania Rogers as Ruth Reynolds, Imogen Bickford-Smith as Girl in disco, Barry Wade as Fashion Photographer
| 5 | "Not a Bad Lad, Dad" | 16 October 1980 |
Beryl, a former girlfriend of Terry, escaping a violent marriage, leaves her nine-year-old son Peter on Terry's doorstep with a note claiming that he's the father. Terry looks after the lad with help from a visiting Penny, and warms to him. However, Beryl's husband tracks them down, and Terry has to fight him off. Guest stars: Sharon Duce as Beryl, Gennie Nevinson as Penny, Dicken Ashworth as Ronnie, Stanley Price as Publican
| 6 | "The Beer Hunter" | 23 October 1980 |
Arthur has a drunken reunion with his former army mate Yorkie, but in the morning Yorkie can't be found at his hotel. In fact, he's ended up with a part-time prostitute, but he can't remember where or what his hotel is. With Yorkie's wife on her way to London from Yorkshire, Arthur and Terry must find Yorkie. The trail takes them via a phantom night porter, a school rugby match (in which Arthur scores a try!) and a one-armed taxi driver, to Yorkie – just in time. (The episode title spoofs the 1978 film The Deer Hunter.) Guest stars: Brian Glover as Yorkie, Georgina Hale as Renee, Janine Duvitski as Carol
| 7 | "A Nice Little Wine" | 30 October 1980 |
Arthur buys a consignment of red wine from dodgy dealer Clive Stannard, but Stannard is later drugged and robbed by a visiting masseuse in his hotel. He blames Arthur, who has to track down the phoney masseuse and get back the money before Stannard sends a former army mate to "do over" Arthur. He traces the culprit to a sleazy sex shop, and recovers the money. However, before it can be returned, Stannard is arrested by DS Chisholm – and Arthur gets to keep the money. Guest stars: Peter Jeffrey as Stannard, Rachel Davies as Bettina, Lois Baxter as Sandra, Pam St. Clement as Sandra's mum, Burt Kwouk as Sojo, Davyd Harries as Policeman, Donald Douglas as Scots Winetaster
| 8 | "All Mod Cons" | 6 November 1980 |
The elderly Charlie Vickery asks Arthur to remove some squatters from a house that he wants to renovate, but Terry discovers that they're actually paying rent to Charlie's granddaughter Kate. When she hires some other muscle to force the tenants out, Terry finds himself up against them. Terry also takes a well paying job as a bouncer at an exclusive nightclub where his current girlfriend, Helen, works but leaves after she is falsely accused of fraud by the crooked manager. Guest stars: Annette Lynton as Helen, Simon Cadell as Simon, Harry Towb as Harry, Toyah Willcox as Kate, Michael Robbins as Jack McQueen, Tony Osoba as Pearce, James Ottaway as Vickery
| 9 | "Diamonds are a Girl's Worst Enemy" | 20 November 1980 |
Terry is hired as driver/bodyguard for old flame Rose Mellors (previously seen in Series 1), who is handling uncut diamonds for dealer Mr Tajvir. Her car is stolen, with the diamonds still in it, and Tajvir is furious. He blames Arthur and Terry and gives them 24 hours to find them. It transpires that Rose had planned to have the car and stones stolen by her own assistant/minder Jacko and go into business for herself. But Terry persuades her to return them, for all their sakes. (The episode title spoofs the song "Diamonds Are A Girl's Best Friend".) Guest stars: Ann Lynn as Rose, Tony Selby as Jacko, George Layton as Des, Zia Mohyeddin as Tajvir, Sam Kydd as Sid, John Ringham as Harrison, Howard Attfield as Driver
| 10 | "The Old School Tie" | 27 November 1980 |
Terry's friend George Palmer escapes from prison with only three months left of his sentence for a diamond robbery and asks Terry to help prove that he was innocent. He was actually on a "job" in a nearby street and was caught escaping the scene. Terry gets a journalist friend to assist, but George is kidnapped by the men behind the diamond robbery. It transpires that George's brother-in-law Harry was the "inside man" and he leads Terry to where George is being held. With DC Rycott's help, George is rescued and the real thieves arrested. George's wife Olive is offered money by the newspaper for her story. Guest stars: Paul Copley as George Palmer, Sherrie Hewson as Olive, Derek Thompson as Harry, Nick Stringer as Tommy, Diana Malin as Debbie
| 11 | "All About Scoring, Innit?" | 4 December 1980 |
Over-sexed footballer Danny Varrow, deep in gambling debts, tries to sell his "exclusive story" to alcoholic sports writer Ronnie Raikes, but Raikes doesn't want to know. Arthur and Terry decide to "manage" him to get a better price for the story and hide him in an expensive penthouse suite at a hotel. But Varrow is being stalked by a farmer whose daughter he had an affair with. Varrow is kidnapped by Rafferty, his loan shark, but Terry manages to get him away when the former's minder turns out to be an old boxing mate of Terry's. Arthur is left deep in debt, and Varrow is sold to a Dutch club. Guest stars: Karl Howman as Danny Varrow, Sean Caffrey as Leo Rafferty, Forbes Collins as Arklow, Adrienne Posta as Jenny, George Sweeney as Clifton Fields, Anthony Douse as Ronnie Raikes, Martin Neil as Reporter
| 12 | "Caught in the Act, Fact" | 11 December 1980 |
Terry is hired to mind Lady Margaret Thompson, but isn't told that she has major memory lapses and shoplifting tendencies. She does go shoplifting while Terry is minding her, but has no memory of it and Terry is arrested and charged. Her husband denies all knowledge of the events and Terry appears in court. DS Chisholm suspects the truth and persuades Terry to plead guilty. He gets a suspended sentence but is furious with Arthur, who did know of Lady Margaret's mental problems. Guest stars: Angela Browne as Lady Margaret, Glyn Houston as Harry Thompson, George Layton as Des, Angus MacKay as Mr. Knight, James Marcus as Bertie, John Rolfe as Collin
| 13 | "A Lot of Bull and a Pat on the Back" | 18 December 1980 |
Arthur is hired by two farmers to repossess a prize bull and persuades a very reluctant Terry to help him. They later read in the newspaper that the bull has been stolen, and Terry, determined to clear himself of any guilt, persuades Arthur to help him steal it back. They return it to the farmers and also return the money they've been paid. Terry also finds time to see off a brothel-keeper who's been hassling Debbie and her fellow strippers. (This is the only episode in which both of Terry's recurring girlfriends, Penny and Debbie, meet.); Guest stars: Derek Benfield as Brown, Diana Malin as Debbie, Gennie Nevinson as Penny Note: For many years it was assumed this episode was the final episode of series 2 because it was broadcast at a later date in the London region. In the London region, Thames broadcast a Telethon for Children's charities on 2 October 1980 and this episode was finally broadcast in the London region to catch up on 18 December 1980. Therefore, on original DVD releases of the series this episode is often mistakenly shown as the final episode in the series, when really it is the fourth. All other regions outside London broadcast this episode in its original position in the series on 2 October 1980.

=== Series 3 (1982) ===
- Broadcast: 13 January – 7 April 1982 (ITV)
- Regular cast: Dennis Waterman as Terry McCann, George Cole as Arthur Daley, Glynn Edwards as Dave Harris

| No. in series | Title | Original release date |
|---|---|---|
| 1 | "Dead Men Do Tell Tales" | 13 January 1982 |
Travel agent Monty Wiseman helps a lady to repatriate her husband's body. The coffin is stored in Arthur's lockup until the funeral, but when an inquest is ordered, Arthur is forced to move the coffin to Terry's flat. Wiseman plans to use an alcoholic tramp ('Incapable'), a former surgeon, to extract smuggled diamonds from the dead body, but all doesn't go as planned. DS Chisholm is also interested in the goings-on. (The title spoofs the 1938 film Dead Men Tell No Tales.) Guest stars: Patricia Maynard as Mrs Chambers, Harry Fowler as Monty Wiseman, Harold Innocent as Incapable, Derek Fowlds as Meadhurst, Suzi Quatro as Nancy, Eileen Way as Mrs. Chambers' Mother, Rayner Bourton as Randolf, Michael Jenkinson as Vicar
| 2 | "You Need Hands" | 20 January 1982 |
Terry is employed to guard a consignment of diamonds, but is injured. Arthur "borrows" Vernon, a minder for a mate of his, to guard the shipment of the diamonds. He finds out that the items being shipped are really drugs and is kidnapped by the dodgy dealer to stop him talking. Then the real owner of the drugs turns up at the meet in a muddy Essex field at dawn, with armed muscle. But Terry and Des have learned of the events and manage to save the day. (The title refers to the song "You Need Hands", sung by Max Bygraves.) Guest stars: Mike Reid as Vernon, Alan MacNaughtan as Merrick, Harry Landis as Lenny Bowman, Julian Holloway as Matthews, Leslie Sarony as man in café, Steve Emerson as Merrick's Heavy, Gareth Milne as Gerry, Martin Fisk as Security Guard
| 3 | "Rembrandt Doesn't Live Here Anymore" | 27 January 1982 |
Talented painter-turned-forger Frankie Simmons is painting copies of "old masters" that a dodgy art dealer can easily sell. Arthur sells one painting to bookmaker Rory Quinn, but no one realises that Frankie's jealous girlfriend Monica has added a small detail that marks it as a fake. Quinn is furious when he finds out and pressures Arthur for his money back. Frankie quickly skips the country. (The title spoofs the 1974 film Alice Doesn't Live Here Anymore.) Guest stars: George Sewell as Frankie Simmons, Ewan Hooper as Quinn, Patricia Quinn as Monica Mason, John Tordoff as Max, Valentino Musetti as Gerry
| 4 | "Looking for Micky" | 3 February 1982 |
"Mad" Micky escapes from prison and makes his way to Debbie's flat. Micky wants to go to the Press to convince the world he has been "misrepresented" as a dangerous convict, thereby hoping to obtain from the authorities a firm date for his release. Debbie goes to Terry to ask him for help, persuading Terry, who knew Micky when they were both boxing, to help Micky go to the newspapers. Arthur sees an opportunity to make some money by selling the story to a journalist, but Micky's nasty former boxing manager has other ideas and does a deal with an equally ruthless journalist to get Micky back to jail. Guest stars: John Labanowski as Micky Dixon, Bill Nighy as Oates, John Moffatt as Freddie Baker, Diana Malin as Debbie, Tom Watson as Anker, Jim McManus as George
| 5 | "Dreamhouse" | 10 February 1982 |
Terry minds pop star Frankie Farrow's country mansion while the latter is supposedly performing in Las Vegas. He meets Farrow's brother Derek, once his assistant and accountant, but now a frustrated and jobless alcoholic. It emerges that Frankie is a "has-been" and is really performing at small workingmen's clubs in the north of England. To top it all, Frankie then decamps to Spain to escape his creditors. Meanwhile, Arthur is being pursued by the vengeful sons of a newly widowed lady, Beryl, whose money he has tried to invest. Guest stars: Richard Griffiths as Derek Farrow, Wanda Ventham as Beryl, Roger Sloman as Georgie Silver, Frank Coda as Mr Woods, Adrian Mills as Stanley, Sidney Kean as Harry
| 6 | "Another Bride, Another Groom" | 17 February 1982 |
Arthur's attempts at organising his niece's wedding turn into a catalogue of disasters. Terry is reluctantly driving the limousine that picks up the bride, but he also has to collect some books on the way. The "books" turn out to be a carload of illegal pornographic magazines that Arthur plans to quickly unload. A corrupt copper follows Terry to the church with a view to blackmailing Arthur, while thugs working for Grantly, the legal owner of the magazines, are following him. The magazines are destined to be pulped, but when Terry's friend is beaten up by the thugs, he exacts revenge. (The title spoofs the phrase "Another Day, Another Dollar".) Guest stars: Warren Clarke as DC Ashmole, Ian Hogg as Grantly, John Judd as Noisy, Desmond McNamara as Reggie, Jeffrey Segal as Middle Aged Man, Jayne Lester as Trina
| 7 | "The Birdman of Wormwood Scrubs" | 24 February 1982 |
Arthur and Terry are asked to look after former gangster Ernie Dodds, just out of prison after 14 years. Arthur helps Ernie financially, on the understanding that the latter will pay him back when he gets his ill-gotten money out of a secret bank account. They discover that the account has been closed and emptied by a corrupt bank manager. And they soon realise that Kate Grundy (daughter of Ernie's former partner), a retired (and corrupt) police superintendent and a bent "screw" are also after the money. But the now-deceased manager has lost the money in bad business deals and all that's left is his widow's pet shop. (The title spoofs the 1962 film Birdman of Alcatraz.) Guest stars: Rula Lenska as Kate Grundy, Maurice Denham as Billings, Max Wall as Ernie Dodds, Joe Ritchie as Ron Grundy, Avril Angers as Mrs Knight, Stephen Greif as Spencer, Frederick Treves as Bank Manager
| 8 | "The Son Also Rises" | 3 March 1982 |
Corrupt property developer Ted Standen refuses to pay Alex Rowan, his former accountant just out of prison. Rowan had kept quiet about Standen's dealings, in return for a promised pay-off. Rowan has Standen's schoolboy son John roughed up to "persuade" him to pay, but Terry, who is given the job of minding John, thinks there's a better way. With assistance from canny accountant Morrie Levin, Standen is confronted by Arthur in the persona of John's financial advisor. Under pressure, Standen is forced to pay Rowan and also pay out his son's trust account as he's just turned 18. (The title spoofs the 1926 novel and 1957 film The Sun Also Rises.) Guest stars: Gareth Hunt as Ted Standen, Annabel Leventon as Muriel Standen, Alfie Bass as Morrie Levin, Gary Waldhorn as Alex Rowan, Stephen Garlick as John Standen, Christopher Ellison as Charlie, Nigel Humphreys as Ronald, David Arlen as Phil, Christopher Coll as Probation Officer Morley, Ozzie Stevens as 1st Youth, Steve Fletcher as 2nd Youth
| 9 | "Why Pay Tax" | 10 March 1982 |
Barry the Book, a high-stakes bookmaker, hires Terry to mind him when making a large payout, but the money is stolen and Terry is injured in the fracas. He learns that the theft wasn't accidental, and Barry loses all his household goods when the real punter comes to collect. Later, to get out of another large debt, Barry ends up working for the betting shop owner, whom Terry has been romancing. Meanwhile, Arthur is dealing with local Irish builder Dermot, purchasing a job-lot of secondhand fireplaces. However, Arthur is conned out of an antique Robert Adam fireplace by Ray's valuer, Cyril. Guest stars: Michael Medwin as Barry the Book, Nigel Davenport as Ray, Kika Markham as Dolly Warner, Roger Brierley as Cyril, Shay Gorman as Forman
| 10 | "Broken Arrow" | 17 March 1982 |
Terry meets Dafydd, a young Welshman, an expert ambidextrous darts player, and Arthur sees the chance to make some money by managing him. After a competition in a rough south London boozer where the locals don't take kindly to his playing, Arthur organises his own tournament. However, fewer players than expected enter, and Arthur is left scrambling to raise the prize money. (The title refers to the 1950 Western film – and subsequent television series of the same name – Broken Arrow.) Guest stars: Sean Mathias as Dafydd Evans, Maggie Steed as Sherry, Edward Peel as Ted Turton, Michael Graham Cox as Wally Brabham, John Joyce as Eddie Pitt, Jonathan Kydd as Len, Paddy Joyce as Pat, Alfred Maron as Little Freddie, Roy Pattison as Man at Silver Rose, Honora Burke as Woman at Silver Rose, Gary Olsen as Derek and Jestyn Phillips as Mr Rice
| 11 | "Poetic Justice, Innit?" | 24 March 1982 |
Terry's girlfriend Debbie, now working as an in-home hairdresser, is a witness to a violent jewellery robbery. Terry helps to track down the perpetrators, although DS Soames, a new arrival on the manor, firmly believes that Debbie and Terry set up the theft. Arthur is called for jury service, at a robbery trial, to the horror of DS Chisholm, the prosecuting officer. Guest stars: Michael Culver as DS Soames, Diana Malin as Debbie, James Cossins as Judge, Larry Martyn as Smith, Barrie Cookson as Parsons, Peter-Hugo Daly as Knowles, Bernard Horsfall as Mr. Russel QC, John Bardon as Jury Member, Lloyd McGuire as Jury Member, Gwyneth Strong as Jury Member, David Sibley as Jury Member
| 12 | "Back in Good Old England" | 31 March 1982 |
Ex-con Jack "Oily" Wragg returns from self-imposed exile in Spain. Terry's glad to see him, but no one else is – Archie, his former partner-in-crime, wants to kill him. Wragg enthusiastically claims to be planning a major wages snatch, but the plan turns out to be ill-conceived and no one will take it seriously. His potential partner gets cold feet, and Jack realises that London has changed too much since he went away. With Archie and his heavies close behind him, he escapes across the English Channel to Holland on a boat provided by a mate of Des. (The title spoofs the popular 1916 music hall song "Take Me Back to Dear Old Blighty".) Guest stars: Pete Postlethwaite as Jack Wragg, David Hargreaves as Archie, Jonathan Fletcher as Nigel Kendal, George Layton as Des, Norman Beaton as Billy, Tariq Yunus as Chris, John Benfield as Painter, Royston Tickner as The Skipper, Stanley McGeagh as Police Sergeant
| 13 | "In" | 7 April 1982 |
Arthur takes delivery of a privately imported BMW car, but his car lot is raided by police and Arthur is arrested for drug trafficking. While he is being interrogated by Rycott and a German detective, and the car is being stripped and searched, Terry tries to track down the delivery driver. He finds his sister, a feisty nurse, and eventually the driver. This leads to a brutal fight leaving them both bloodied and battered on a London bus. Due to lack of evidence Arther is released. As Arther leaves the police station Terry is brought in for affray. (The title spoofs the 1978 Thames Television series Out.) Guest stars: Frederick Jaeger as Inspector Klingmann, Brian Cox as Frank, Lindy Whiteford as Bridget, Russell Hunter as Billy "The Ferret", Diane Langton as Rita, John Hallam as Gypsy Joe, Linal Haft as Ronnie, Barry Stanton as Georgie, Dominic Allan as Police Doctor, Annette Badland as Nurse, Edward Kelsey as Foreman, Peter Van Dissel as Plain Clothes Man, Timothy Block as Armed Officer, Trevor Cooper as Officer 2, Brian Grellis as Van Radio Officer

=== Series 4 (1983–84) ===
- Broadcast: 26 December 1983 – 21 March 1984 (ITV)
- Regular cast: Dennis Waterman as Terry McCann, George Cole as Arthur Daley, Glynn Edwards as Dave Harris

| No. in series | Title | Original release date |
|---|---|---|
| 1 | "Minder's Christmas Bonus" | 26 December 1983 |
Arthur and Terry help Dave to decorate the Christmas tree in the Winchester, while 'Er Indoors and the children are supposedly on their way to Florida. It transpires that the tickets, purchased by Arthur from a mate, are standby only, and she is not pleased. She remains stranded at the airport, but Arthur makes a few urgent calls and eventually she gets away. At the Winchester, they reminisce about times past; clips from previous episodes are shown, featuring such memorable characters as Maurice Michaelson, Big Bobby Altman, and Scotch Harry.
| 2 | "Rocky Eight and a Half" | 11 January 1984 |
"Dirty Harry" Lynch suggests to Arthur that Terry might want to return to boxing – seven years after losing his licence – and fight his former opponent Jackie Wilson in a "pirate" match. Initially not enthusiastic, even with the chance to make some money, Terry is persuaded and goes back into intensive training with "Soldier" Atkins. Arthur sees the chance to make some easy money from betting. But Wilson's wife, worried about his health, asks Terry to go easy on him. The match, attended by Rycott and other police officers, turns into a "needle match", and Terry knocks Wilson out, winning the match. And Arthur, who Harry has swindled in a property deal, makes some money out of it. (The episode title spoofs the 1982 film Rocky III.) Guest stars: Christine Kavanagh as Nicky, David Lodge as "Soldier" Atkins, George Innes as Harry Lynch, Ian McNeice as Eric Morgan, Frank Gatliff as Darrow, the Solicitor, Donald Eccles as Medical Officer, Jonathan Burn as Boxing M.C., Bruce Wells as Boxing Referee
| 3 | "Senior Citizen Caine" | 18 January 1984 |
Recently widowed car dealer Cecil Caine divides up the business between his two greedy sons, whom he hates. Knowing that the family want to have him institutionalised, he gets Terry to protect him while he hides in the canal narrowboat he has bought for his retirement. It emerges that Caine has been having an affair with his secretary and has also been fiddling his taxes for many years. When the VAT inspectors track him down, it is Cecil's son Johnny who is put in the frame, while Caine and Miss Jones drive off into the sunset on a classic motorbike. (The episode title spoofs the 1941 film Citizen Kane.) Guest stars: Lionel Jeffries as Cecil Caine, Keith Barron as Johnny Caine, Angela Richards as Sheila Jones, John Carlin as Derek Caine, James Cosmo as Jock McLeish, Iain Rattray as Scotsman, Gillian Taylforth as Girl in Pub, Kim Taylforth as Girl in Pub, Griffith Davies as Drunk
| 4 | "High Drains Pilferer" | 25 January 1984 |
While Terry is driving for gangster-turned-businessman Micky "The Fish" Metcalfe, Micky's girlfriend's flat is burgled and expensive jewellery stolen. Micky is furious, and DS Chisholm initially suspects Terry's involvement. However, Terry thinks he knows who the culprit is – his former cellmate and cat burglar, Eddie. Despite Terry's assistance, Eddie is arrested. (The episode title spoofs the 1973 film High Plains Drifter.) Guest stars: David Calder as Micky the Fish, Sheila Ruskin as Susie Blake, Chris Matthews as Eddie Venables, Paul Brooke as Hamster
| 5 | "Sorry Pal, Wrong Number" | 1 February 1984 |
Arthur starts a horse-race tipping service with J.J. Mooney, a suave and persuasive elderly conman. Terry cops the job of giving out the daily selections from the office – which turns out to be three telephone boxes outside a West London railway station. An initial success, the business quickly folds when J.J. is admitted to hospital after a heart attack. Arthur learns that J.J. had a similar arrangement with Sprott, a corrupt copper, recently dismissed from the force, and Sprott now wants Arthur's share – or else! (The episode title spoofs the 1948 film Sorry, Wrong Number.) Guest stars: T. P. McKenna as J.J. Mooney, Shaun Curry as Sprott, Royce Mills as Andrew, Vivian Mann as Tony, Rosalind Lloyd as Fenella, Timothy Bateson as Railwayman, Hugh Futcher as Mo, Alan Chuntz as Punter in Betting Shop
| 6 | "The Car Lot Baggers" | 8 February 1984 |
Someone is sabotaging Wally West's car lot, burning cars and stealing documents. Initial suspicion falls on a local group of Irish travellers, but Nathan, their leader, proves to Terry, who's minding the lot, that they are innocent. With Nathan's help, Terry tracks down the miscreants, who admit to working for a ruthless property developer, Apsimon, who wants to buy Wally's land cheaply. He is assisted in this by Fribbins, a corrupt local councillor. Arthur and Wally confront Apsimon and negotiate a steep price for Wally's land. (The episode title spoofs the 1964 film The Carpetbaggers.) Guest stars: Jimmy Nail as Nathan Loveridge, Ray Winstone as Arnie, June Whitfield as Tilly Murdoch, Artro Morris as Mr De Ath, Harry Scott as Wally West, James Faulkner as Apsimon, Colin Jeavons as Fribbins, Christopher Benjamin as Mr. Rushmer, Jeff Stewart as Mick, John Altman as Cabbie
| 7 | "If Money Be the Food of Love, Play On" | 15 February 1984 |
An attractive Australian girl arrives at the Winchester, seeking Arthur's help in finding her former boyfriend, believed to be living in London. While searching, Arthur manages to sub-rent her Terry's flat, sell her a second-hand car and a stolen fur coat. The man, when found, turns out to be a partner-in-crime of the girl, having absconded with criminal proceeds. He reluctantly hands over what cash is left, and the girl returns to Australia. (The episode title spoofs the line "If music be the food of love, play on", from Shakespeare's Twelfth Night.) Guest stars: Penny Downie as Dee Rogers, Larry Lamb as Greg Collins, Barry Jackson as Mournful Morris, Laurence Harrington as Builder
| 8 | "A Star is Gorn" | 22 February 1984 |
Pop star Zac Zolar (aka Albert Trout) disappears at the height of his fame. A dead body turns up, but the police are unable to find anyone who can identify it as that of Zolar. Arthur inadvertently buys a discarded master tape of Zolar's unreleased early recordings, and tries to sell it at a high price to the record company. But Zolar's ruthless manager, Cyril Ash, also wants them. Ash's minder tracks down Zolar at his girlfriend's place in the country, where he wants to get away from the business, under the new name of Alan Trent. He is kidnapped by Ash, but Terry is able to find and rescue him. They all meet at the recording studio, but to their chagrin, the tape has been stored next to a box of magnetic toys in Arthur's lockup and is unusable. (The episode title spoofs the 1954 film A Star is Born). Guest stars: Mel Smith as Cyril Ash, Mike Holoway as Zac Zolar, Primi Townsend as Sharon, Charles Kay as John Sutton, Tim Healy as George, Jackie Smith-Wood as Jessica Trent, Michael Deeks as Billy Cronin
| 9 | "Willesden Suite" | 29 February 1984 |
Terry becomes temporary house detective at a hotel where Arthur is supplying Norma Bates, the manageress, with toilet rolls and butter and jam portions. He's persuaded to address a Rotary Club luncheon, but when his carefully crafted script goes missing, the result is a drunken disaster. The lunch is violently interrupted by a jewel thief who was in league with the manageress. Meanwhile, Terry has to cope with two thieves posing as priests, and a would-be model being fleeced by a lecherous photographer. (The episode title spoofs the 1978 film California Suite.) Guest stars: Toby Robins as Norma Bates, Susan Kyd as Sue, William Simons as Pongo, Bernard Kay as Charles Riding, Valentine Palmer as Barry Pollard, Reece Dinsdale as Steve, Brian Hawksley as Mr. Robinson, Sally Jane Jackson as Karen Bradly
| 10 | "Windows" | 7 March 1984 |
Arthur starts a health club, the "Daley Workout", with moonlighting blackjack dealers acting as coaches. His business partner's wife and daughter disappear, and Terry, the daughter's godfather, finds himself having to sort out the resultant mess. He also tangles with a cannabis-growing would-be gangster. The club is closed down by the local health authority. (The title spoofs the title of 1983 Thames television series Widows.) Guest stars: Patrick Troughton as Joe Mancini, Jenifer Landor as Laura, Stephen Rea as Roddy, Tony Anholt as Johnny Petselli, Janet Fielding as Janice, Billy Hartman as Billy, Judith Byfield as Ms. Knight, Jack Le White as Old Irishman
| 11 | "Get Daley" | 14 March 1984 |
Arthur is a witness when a gunman threatens a man who then dies of a heart attack. Chisholm questions him and the dead man's business partner over the killing, but can't prove anything. Arthur, in hospital for minor surgery; gets a midnight visit from a thug, working for Albert "Wendy" Wendle, a crooked and agoraphobic bookmaker who's owed money by the dead man. Terry assists in getting Chisholm to Nick Wendle and his associates. (The episode title spoofs the 1971 film Get Carter.) Guest stars: Gorden Kaye as Sammy, Roger Hammond as Albert Wendle, Peter Alexander as Tony Apsey, Maureen O'Farrell as Sandra, Frank Mills as Harry Martin, Kevin Lloyd as Dermott, Brian Peck as Vic Harrison, Miranda Forbes as Nurse
| 12 | "A Well Fashioned Fit-Up" | 21 March 1984 |
Terry acts as night-guard to a collection of designer clothes at Ronald Shyver's fashion house. But as he's already engaged as bouncer for the opening of an Irish pub, Arthur agrees to take part of his shift. Terry is late arriving, following a major fight at the pub, and when he turns up, Arthur has gone – and so have the clothes. It emerges that Shyver arranged the theft himself to have the clothes cheaply copied in Hong Kong, thus cheating Zoe, the talented designer. As revenge, Terry, Arthur and Zoe arrange to have the garments replaced by a load of "high street tat", to be themselves cheaply copied. Shyver is furious but can do nothing about it. Guest stars: Stanley Meadows as Ronald Shyver, Sara Sugarman as Zoe, Gerard Murphy as Kevin O'Hara, Richard Ireson as Market Stallholder, George Little as Ted

=== Series 5 (1984) ===
- Broadcast: 5 September – 26 December 1984 (ITV)
- Regular cast: Dennis Waterman as Terry McCann, George Cole as Arthur Daley, Glynn Edwards as Dave Harris

| No. in series | Title | Original release date |
|---|---|---|
| 1 | "Goodbye Sailor" | 5 September 1984 |
Arthur does a deal with Commander Hawksly to buy some cheap tobacco, sending Terry and Arnie down to Buckler's Hard to collect the stock. The following morning, when Arthur joins them, they find that Hawksly and Winstanley, the commodore of the sailing club, are running a profitable racket, smuggling the tobacco from France. They have to go out on Hawksly's boat for the handover. They make the collection, but are detected and chased by a Customs launch, giving them the slip, although Winstanley is caught. Some of the tobacco, which was jettisoned overboard, is washed up on mudflats and the intrepid trio retrieve it. (The title spoofs the popular phrase, "Hello, sailor!") Guest stars: Moray Watson as Commander Hawksly, Reginald Marsh as Johnny Winstanley, Ray Winstone as Arnie, Sarah Berger as Penny, Peter Rutherford as Large Man, Bill Treacher as Punter
| 2 | "What Makes Shamy Run?" | 12 September 1984 |
Shamy, a young Anglo-Indian conman and petty crook, working in a Brick Lane video shop, settles a debt to Arthur with shonky banknotes – money that comes to DS Chisholm's attention and leads to a search of Arthur's lockup. Shamy tries to persuade Arthur to back him in a plot to steal a master tape of a new-release Bollywood film and have it copied in Bombay. When he refuses, Terry, who's had a big win on the horses with a "Yankee" bet, backs him. Shamy carries out the theft and goes to Bombay. Much to everyone's surprise, the deal works out and Shamy decides to stay there, even sending for his wife. And there's a financial return for Terry, much to Arthur's chagrin. (The title spoofs the 1941 novel and subsequent Broadway musical What Makes Sammy Run?) Guest stars: Art Malik as Shamy, Robbie Coltrane as Mr Henry, Fred Evans as "The Syrup", Albert Moses as Mr Desai, Madhav Sharma as Mr. Mitra, Stacy Davies as Smudger, Ishaq Bux as Elderly Indian Man
| 3 | "A Number of Old Wives Tales" | 19 September 1984 |
"Confident Clive" Cosgrove is getting married. He invites Arthur to give the bride away and Terry to be Best Man. Despite hardly knowing anything about Clive's personal life, they agree. Arnie volunteers to provide a bridal limousine, but it turns out to be a second-hand recovery truck. After the ceremony at Chiswick register office, the bride's drunken ex-husband turns up and an altercation ensues. A photo gets into the local newspaper, where it's seen by various other ladies. It emerges that Clive is already married, and not just once, but several times, and also has two children by two different wives. His various wives and the police are already on his trail. After hiding in a male-only health club, Cosgrove is persuaded to give himself up to DS Chisholm, but flees from the wrath of his various furious "wives". Guest stars: Patrick Mower as Cosgrove, Kate Williams as Mary, Ray Winstone as Arnie, Sue Holderness as Laura, Gary Holton as Barry, Jonathan Kydd as Ernie, Kenneth Waller as Roland, David Weston as Peter, Michael Attwell as Harry, Peter Dennis as Geoffrey
| 4 | "The Second Time Around" | 26 September 1984 |
Retired romance novelist Ruby Hubbard (aka Lorraine Masters) returns from Capri to write another novel, as she needs the money. But she finds that she has writer's block. On top of that, her swish Hampstead house has been sold from under her in a crooked Spanish property deal perpetrated by her estranged, philandering husband Barney. Arthur, who had an innocent hand in the sale, has enquiries made to expose the fraud. Terry takes on the job of minding Ruby, but finds himself assisting in devising the plot and even writing the story. Barney and his crooked lawyer return from Spain and Arthur forces them to pay Ruby her share of the sale. The novel is completed and delivered to the publishers, who are well aware that it's essentially a rewrite of her first novel. Ruby and Barney return to Capri. Guest stars: Beryl Reid as Ruby, Bill Maynard as Barney Todd, John F. Landry as Ronnie Todd, Ivor Roberts as Jack Hodgson, Nigel Le Vaillant as Andy, Peter Birrel as John Scott, David Webb as John Draham
| 5 | "Second Hand Pose" | 10 October 1984 |
Terry is nearly frozen to death in a butcher's cold store. On recovery, he angrily swears not to work with Arthur anymore and is offered a job with Charlie Pope, a second-hand furniture dealer. Charlie and Terry get a house-clearing job from an estate agency, but unknown to Terry, Charlie is removing (stealing) furniture from another flat in the same block – some of which Arthur immediately sells on with a large mark-up. Terry is furious when he realises that he's been had, and by then DS Rycott is onto them. Pulled in by Rycott, Terry and Charlie swear innocence. Unable to prove anything definite, Rycott is forced to let them go and they promptly replace all the stolen goods. Everyone's happy, except the baffled Rycott. And Terry returns to Arthur's employ. (The title spoofs the song "Second Hand Rose".) Guest stars: Billy Murray as Charlie Pope, David Warbeck as Roger Collins, Stacy Dorning as Abigail Collins, Andrew Lodge as John Rawlings, Johnny Shannon as Roly, Roy Boyd as Bill, Tim Pearce as Ben, Roger Nott as Ambulance Attendant
| 6 | "The Long Ride Back to Scratchwood" | 17 October 1984 |
Justin James concocts a scheme with a former footballer to obtain tickets for an England v Scotland football match. He plans to on-sell them at a major mark-up to Scottish fans. With Arthur's financial backing, he hopes to cut out Phil the 'Ticket King'. Arthur puts up the money and they set off for Scotland with the tickets. Phil and his minder follow, and a confrontation ensues at a motorway service area. Arthur is forced to sell the tickets to Phil, but before the deal goes down, it emerges that the tickets are actually forged – so there's no deal, and no return for anyone. Guest stars: Mark Farmer as Justin James, Alan Hunter as Steve Benson, Jon Croft as Alisdair Fraser, James Marcus as Phil, Derek Martin as Cedric, Nicolas Chagrin as Mario, David Beckett as Mechanic
| 7 | "Hypnotising Rita" | 24 October 1984 |
Arthur and Terry provide sanctuary to a young girl, Rita, and her boyfriend. Rita's brothers are trying to break them up. She explains that she'll inherit some money on her birthday, a few days hence, but believes that he isn't interested in the money, only her. Her boyfriend, Walter Sudbury, a hypnotist, assists Arthur in return for sanctuary, by making him believe that his cigars taste of burning rubber. Arthur and Terry attempt to mediate between Rita and her Mother, but it transpires that there is no money to inherit. Rita refuses to listen to her Mother's pleas, even after Sudbury vanishes. Arthur also makes a foray into the carpet cleaning business, but exits quickly after he ruins a valuable Persian rug. (The title spoofs the 1980 play and subsequent film Educating Rita.) Guest stars: Nicola Cowper as Rita, Donald Sumpter as Sudbury, June Brown as Rita's mum, Renu Setna as Mr. Sharman, Sally Faulkner as Clare
| 8 | "The Balance of Power" | 31 October 1984 |
After Arthur's car lot is threatened with a compulsory purchase order, he storms off to the town hall to complain to his councillor. But the latter has just died and an election is pending. Arthur decides to stand as an independent "law and order" candidate. The opposing parties, realising that Arthur might well be elected and hold the political balance on the council, launch a "dirty tricks" campaign to discredit him. The police are supplied with fake tip-offs and DS Chisholm is forced to question Arthur about major diamond smuggling – despite knowing that Arthur is really only a small-time operator. Julie, a journalist, writing an article on Terry's boxing experiences, assists with the campaign and sees to it that Lent, a journalist in the pay of the opposition councillors, stays permanently drunk until election day. Arthur wins the election by a landslide, but his win is invalidated when it is revealed that he overspent on his campaign expenses. Guest stars: Caroline Langrishe as Julie, Peter Woodthorpe as Jeff Lent, Clifford Rose as Cooke, Brian McDermott as Blakeney, Neville Jason as Rutherford, Nicholas Courtney as Raymond Wilkins, Michael Ripper as Commissionaire, Chris Sullivan as Poker Player, Graham Cull as Taxi Driver
| 9 | "Around the Corner" | 26 December 1984 |
Arthur acquires a "racing" greyhound in settlement of a debt. He is offered a good deal on a consignment of video players by Fred and Ted, mates of conman "Tasty Tim". Rycott and Chisholm both independently receive tip-offs about the deal and hope to arrest Arthur for receiving. It turns out that Tim's been conning Fred and Ted. It falls to Terry to track them down and get back Arthur's money. In the meantime, Rycott and Chisholm both try to arrest Arthur, crashing their police cars – which results in a roasting by their boss, DI Norton. Guest stars: Colin Farrell as Tasty Tim, Tony Caunter as DI Norton, Brian Capron as Fred, Sidney Kean as Harry

=== Series 6 (1985) ===
- Broadcast: 4 September – 26 December 1985 (ITV)
- Regular cast: Dennis Waterman as Terry McCann, George Cole as Arthur Daley, Glynn Edwards as Dave Harris

| No. in series | Title | Original release date |
|---|---|---|
| 1 | "Give Us This Day Arthur Daley's Bread" | 4 September 1985 |
Arthur gives some landscaping work to a group of ex-criminals, who the Vicar of St Chad's, is (thus far, unsuccessfully) trying to persuade to "go straight". While they carry out the job, under Terry's unwilling supervision, they also start stealing household goods from the neighbouring houses – which they store in the church vestry. They are found out, but return the items before Chisholm and Jones are able to arrest them. (Episode title spoofs the Biblical quotation "Give us this day our daily bread".) Guest stars: James Booth as Godfrey, Avril Elgar as Mrs Bickerton-Jones, David Jackson as Marion, Norman Eshley as Rev. Brian Redwood, Sylvia Kay as Mrs Hurst, Geraldine Alexander as Fiona Hurst, Eric Francis as "Glue", Nat Jackley as "Paper", Ellis Dale as Mr Howlett, Patsy Smart as Mrs. Foskitt, Paul Cooper as Ron
| 2 | "Life in the Fast Food Lane" | 11 September 1985 |
Arthur buys a consignment of car phones from Joseph McTaggart and his assistant/technician Ozzie, but soon finds out that they're not British Telecom approved. Meanwhile, Terry has started romancing Sarah Bates, not knowing she's the daughter of Sir Ronald Bates, ruthless self-made millionaire owner of "Bates Bigger Burgers". To break up Terry and expensively educated Sarah, Bates has him beaten up by thugs. When this doesn't work, he promises ten thousand pounds to Arthur to split them up. But Bates goes bust and escapes to Spain before he can pay the money. With DS Chisholm and a quietly amused DC Jones hot on his trail, Arthur is forced to give the phones back to Ozzie (McTaggart has gone bankrupt and has vanished), who decamps to Glasgow with them, seconds ahead of Chisholm and Jones. (The episode title spoofs the expression "life in the fast lane".) Guest stars: Jake D'Arcy as McTaggart, Peter Capaldi as Ozzie, Jan Francis as Sarah Bates, Timothy Carlton as Granger, Benjamin Whitrow as Doctor, David Daker as Sir Ronald Bates, Debbie Arnold as Julie, Royce Mills as Andrew, Howard Attfield as Private Detective
| 3 | "The Return of the Invincible Man" | 18 September 1985 |
S and S Clothing is bankrupt – again – and Solly Salmon asks Arthur to arrange a break-in and theft of the cash in the safe so that he can't pay his workers their redundancy entitlements. Mindful of his police record, Terry stays out of it and the job falls to the Beesley brothers and Scotch Harry (previously seen in "The Smaller They Are"). However, Harry bungles the job and ends up in hospital with facial burns. Chisholm and Jones strongly suspect what's happened but can't prove it. Even Terry has a cast-iron alibi. Harry is spirited out of hospital before his bandages come off and returned to his wife – whom he deserted many years before. Solly restarts his business, but Arthur is out of pocket after the events. (The title spoofs the names of horror movie sequels featuring recurring characters, such as The Invisible Man.) Guest stars: Phil McCall as Scotch Harry, John Bluthal as Solly, Anne Kristen as Margaret Stuart, Anna Savva as Angie, Pat Roach as Painter, Paul Cooper as Ron, Mike Sarne as Billy Beesley
| 4 | "Arthur is Dead, Long Live Arthur" | 25 September 1985 |
Under siege by tax collectors and other creditors, Arthur decides there's only one way out. He disappears, leaving a suicide note, which berates the Inland Revenue for hounding him. The note is found by a newspaper reporter and Arthur becomes a minor celebrity. But unknown to anyone, even Terry, Arthur has gone to ground in a small hotel, disguised as a novelist seeking solitude. Terry is furious with Arthur for not confiding in him. The hotel owner has realised who her mysterious guest is. She is highly insulted, but agrees to play along with the story that Arthur stumbled in one night with amnesia. In return, Arthur gives her the Ford Granada car he'd been driving. Chisholm and Jones don't believe his story, but can't prove otherwise. Most of Arthur's cronies at the Winchester, who had contributed to have a papier-mâché bust of him made, are (fairly) pleased to see him restored to life. (Episode title spoofs the proverb "the King is dead, long live the King".) Guest stars: Penny Morrell as Daphne Mount, Mark Farmer as Justin, Jonathan Elsom as Mr Muir, Ben Howard as Second-hand Sid, Robert Austin as Freddy the Fly, Royce Mills as Andrew, Johnnie Wade as Albert, Paul Cooper as Ron, John Alkin as John Beadle, Barry Ewart as 1st Reporter, John Livesey as 2nd Reporter
| 5 | "From Fulham with Love" | 2 October 1985 |
Arthur is forced to give Nigel, his wife's skinhead nephew, a job. His only skill appears to be sewing, learned in prison, so he alters a batch of tracksuits that Arthur plans to sell to Sergei, a seaman from a Russian cargo ship in the London Docks. Arthur's mate, Ernie, also wants Arthur to sell the seaman digital watches and personal stereos, but when the deal is made, Arthur is paid in roubles, which his bank won't exchange. The ship's boatswain and political officer, the attractive Natasha, seeks out Terry and gets him and Arthur to track down Sergei, who has gone on a drunken tour of London with Ernie. He seems to want to defect, but before Natasha and his crewmates can persuade him not to, Chisholm arrests the whole party. DCI Norton is furious at a possible diplomatic incident and has them released. (Episode title spoofs the 1963 film From Russia with Love.) Guest stars: Joe Melia as Ernie, Rula Lenska as Natasha, Michael Gothard as Sergei, Tony Caunter as DCI Norton, Jonathan Warren as Nigel, Claire Davenport as Nigel's mum. (Trivia: Dennis Waterman and Rula Lenska would later get married in 1987.)
| 6 | "Waiting for Goddard" | 9 October 1985 |
Albert Goddard, an eccentric recluse, may have inherited a large sum of money. A private detective engages Arthur to locate him, but Albert isn't interested. Seeing the opportunity to make some money, Arthur persuades Goddard to move into one of his rental properties, only to be accused of kidnapping him. Albert eventually receives his legacy of £200,000 after being "sprung" by Terry, who gives the £45 finder's fee to a very disgruntled Arthur. The episode ends with the two main characters not on good terms, and with their relationship unclear, Terry having resigned – or been sacked – part-way through the episode. (Episode title spoofs the 1952 play Waiting for Godot.) Guest stars: Ronald Fraser as Albert Goddard, Kenneth Cope as "Scooter", Mel Martin as Caroline Selby, Donald Douglas as Mr. Prosser, Seán Barrett as Mugger
| TV–film | "Minder on the Orient Express" | 25 December 1985 |
See synopsis at Minder on the Orient Express Guest cast: Peter Childs as Detective Sergeant Ronald "Kenny" Rycott, Patrick Malahide as Detective Sergeant Albert "Charlie" Chisholm, Ralph Bates as François LeBlanc, Robert Beatty as The Judge, Honor Blackman as Helen Spender, James Coombes as Mark Graves, Maurice Denham as Meredith Gascoyne, Adam Faith as James Crane, James Faulkner as Ted Moore, Ronald Lacey as Harry Ridler, Amanda Pays as Nikki South, Manning Redwood as Angelo Cappelloni, Dennis Edwards as Mr. Dryden, Katherine Schofield as Deborah South, Virginia Wetherell as Debbie South, John Moreno as Claude, Garfield Morgan as Superintendent Mason, Jonathan Kydd as Van Driver. (Episode title spoofs the 1974 film Murder on the Orient Express.)

=== Series 7 (1988–89) ===
- Broadcast: 26 December 1988 – 6 February 1989 (ITV)
- Regular cast: Dennis Waterman as Terry McCann, George Cole as Arthur Daley, Glynn Edwards as Dave Harris

| No. in series | Title | Original release date |
|---|---|---|
| TV–film | "An Officer and a Car Salesman" | 26 December 1988 |
See synopsis at An Officer and a Car Salesman. (Episode title spoofs the 1982 film An Officer and a Gentleman.) Patrick Malahide as Albert "Charlie" Chisholm, Peter Childs as DS Rycott, Michael Povey as DC Jones, Richard Briers as Col. Caplan, Diana Quick as Annie, Mark McManus as Dixon, Simon Williams as Roger, Garfield Morgan as Supt. Mason, George Sweeney as Alfie, Clive Swift as Chisholm's director, Al Hunter Ashton as Bindle, John Judd as Williams, Nigel Miles-Thomas as Mitchell, Gordon Salkilld as Gold refinery manager, Iain Rattray as Police officer, Martin Fisk as Security guard, Sean Blowers as Security guard
| 1 | "It's a Sorry Lorry Morrie" | 2 January 1989 |
Business is bad for Arthur; his warehouse is empty and he is driving a clapped-out Ford Granada. He's persuaded to buy a lorry-load of stolen electronic goods. The lorry is parked on a derelict site owned by Fat Charlie. The plan is to collect the goods under cover of darkness, but Arthur discovers too late he's been set up and that the van is the subject of a police stakeout. To make matters worse – Terry's fingerprints are all over it. Self-Inflicted Sid (a severe alcoholic) volunteers to torch the van using petrol, despite concerns that he isn't up to the job. Meanwhile, while the police argue over which Sergeant has jurisdiction, Jones and Rycott miss Arthur picking up the goods, but end up accidentally causing Sid's petrol to ignite, destroying the van and the evidence in the process. Guest stars: Roy Kinnear as Fat Charlie, Ronald Fraser as Self-Inflicted Sid, James Marcus as Morrie, Garfield Morgan as Supt. Mason, Kenneth Farrington as George, Steve McFadden as Mickey, Claire Toeman as Young Mother, Tom Owen as Keith
| 2 | "Days of Fines and Closures" | 9 January 1989 |
Dave fails to return from a coach trip to Folkestone and Terry temporarily takes over running the Winchester. The licence is up for renewal and he has to appear in court to defend the renewal. With DS Rycott pushing for the refusal of the licence, Arthur successfully argues for the renewal of the licence, with covert assistance from DS Jones, who wants the club kept open. Dave returns, having been arrested while drunk – in Hamburg. (Episode title spoofs the 1962 film Days of Wine and Roses.) Guest stars: George Baker as Cooper, Patricia Maynard as Lucy Harris, Thorley Walters as The Magistrate, Tony Selby as Muldoon, Del Henney as Tombo, Michael Melia as Fletcher, John Nettleton as William Shanks, Tim Barrett as Auctioneer
| 3 | "Fatal Impression" | 16 January 1989 |
Patrick Riley, a supposedly reformed gambler, owes Arthur and others over thirteen thousand pounds in gambling debts – but he refuses to leave his house and face his creditors. When they stake out his house in Hounslow, his wife announces that he's just died. On entering the house, Arthur notices Riley's impression on the sheet where the body has been lying and decides that it can be promoted as a religious miracle, with a "nice little earner" to be made. But no one, not even the local newspaper reporter, will take it seriously and the plan comes to nothing. Arthur takes the sheet home and his wife innocently washes it. The police arrest Riley and his wife trying to skip the country. While this is going on, Terry gives refuge to a battered wife, a former girlfriend of him, and considers making it a permanent arrangement, but she is reconciled to her husband. (The title spoofs the 1987 film Fatal Attraction.) Guest stars: Billy Connolly as Tick Tack, Dick Sullivan as Riley, Valerie Lilley as Devla Riley, Sheila Steafel as the Pub singer, Stephen Cuttle as Little Steve, Kim Thomson as Sylvie, Ian Redford as Stevo, John Abineri as Mr Marsden
| 4 | "The Last Video Show" | 23 January 1989 |
Big-time gangster Jack Last has a compromising video of corrupt DI Dyer and colleagues at his villa in Spain. He keeps the video at home, but his wife Sandra innocently returns it in a different cover to the video-hire shop "Daley Videos", which Arthur is running. Last tries to find the video for blackmail purposes, and eventually tracks it to the shop and threatens Arthur if the video isn't produced. They eventually hand it over, but as insurance, they make a copy. Terry returns the video to Last and the copy to Dyer. But when they view the tapes, they find that Arthur has messed up the recording and the compromising film has been taped over with a children's cartoon. (The episode title spoofs the 1971 film The Last Picture Show.) Guest stars: Brian Blessed as DI Dyer, Garfield Morgan as Supt Mason, Ian McShane as Jack Last, Rula Lenska as Sandra Last, Patrick Ryecart as Nigel, Tony Vogel as Det. Sgt. Bradshaw, David Arlen as Charlie, Milton Johns as Mr. Sinclair, Emma Wray as Tracy
| 5 | "Fiddler on the Hoof" | 30 January 1989 |
A security depository has been turned over. Arthur's safety deposit box (containing money no-one knows about) has not been touched but the one that bagman Maltese Tony is supposed to open has been emptied. Desperate to fulfil his contract, Tony breaks into Arthur's lock-up, takes part of the money and delivers it to his contact. Tony is beaten up by a gangland mobster whose brother he landed in jail. (The episode title spoofs the 1971 film Fiddler on the Roof.) Guest stars: Michael Kitchen as "Maltese" Tony Manzoni, Don Henderson as Billy Lynch, Billy Murray as Mick, Gerald Campion as Café Owner, John Tordoff as Shop Assistant, David Simeon as Assistant Manager, Lloyd McGuire as Kramer's Man
| 6 | "The Wrong Goodbye" | 6 February 1989 |
Arthur's bank manager won't extend his already considerable overdraft and his car lot, lock-up and goods have been seized for non-payment. He contemplates retirement, but he hasn't paid National Insurance since 1957, so does not qualify for a state pension. Terry tries unsuccessfully to get a bank loan to buy Arthur out, but then an attractive offer comes from entrepreneur Guy Wheeler to buy the entire business. But Guy is conspiring with a corrupt town planning officer and the bank manager – fellow Freemasons – to get Arthur's land cheaply so that it can be sold to build a supermarket. Arthur does the deal anyway, contemplating a comfortable retirement. His accountant explains that after capital gains tax and payment of his debts, he'll be virtually penniless. Arthur and his lawyer try desperately to withdraw from the deal, but this would equally cost them big money and Arthur would still be penniless after paying penalties. Terry's current girlfriend, a clerk in the council planning office, overhears what's going on and informs Terry who speaks to DS Jones. Jones too is a Freemason, and although he is loath to assist Arthur, he can't ignore what he's learned. He has "a little chat" with his fellow masons and as a result, it is Wheeler who withdraws from the agreement. So in the end, Arthur not only retains his business but makes some extra money from the deal. (The episode title spoofs the 1973 film The Long Goodbye.) Guest stars: Paul Eddington as Guy Wheeler, Simon Cadell as William Pierce, the bank manager, Michael Lees as Tony Davis, Iain Cuthbertson as McKenna, Mark Farmer as Justin, Cassie Stuart as Veronica, Royce Mills as Andrew, Morris Perry as DHSS Manager, Ray Mort as Billy

=== Series 8 (1991) ===
- Broadcast: 5 September – 25 December 1991 (ITV)
- Regular cast: George Cole as Arthur Daley, Gary Webster as Ray Daley, Glynn Edwards as Dave Harris

| No. in series | Title | Original release date |
|---|---|---|
| 1 | "The Loneliness of the Long Distance Entrepreneur" | 5 September 1991 |
Terry marries and leaves for Australia without telling anyone, leaving Arthur unprotected and vulnerable to opportunists. One gang even tries to offer "protection" to the Winchester club. Arthur is asked to give his nephew Ray a job and after he proves himself as tough as Terry was, he becomes Arthur's new minder and assistant. Ray finds his French language skills of use when he is sent to Brussels to pick up a car, which DS Morley has ordered. Ray suspects that the car is being used for nefarious purposes and saves Arthur from being arrested for drug trafficking. (The title spoofs the 1962 film The Loneliness of the Long Distance Runner.) Guest stars: Roberta Taylor as Pat Norris, Raymond Brody as Bouncing Morry, Lill Roughley as Doreen Daley, Allie Byrne as Lucy, Tim Barker as Wilf
| 2 | "A Bouquet of Barbed Wine" | 12 September 1991 |
Arthur is persuaded by Herbie Collins to buy a large consignment of British wine allegedly made by the "Blessed Brothers of Saint Bidolph" in Kent. Before Arthur can collect the wine, Collins is arrested and the warehouse chained up prior to an inventory being taken. Ray and Arthur break in and take the cases they have already paid for. Arthur holds an official launch of "Bulldog Wines PLC" at the Winchester, but discovers that all the wine has been "corked" and is unsaleable. So he and Ray break back into the warehouse and return the wine. In doing so, he is stuck between floors on a broken-down lift. In the morning, DS Morley and DC Park find him still stuck in the lift. (The title spoofs the 1976 TV series A Bouquet of Barbed Wire.) Guest stars: Philip McGough as Herbie Collins, Emma Cunningham as Gloria, Charlie Roe as Parnham, Martyn Read as Policeman
| 3 | "Whatever Happened to Her Indoors" | 19 September 1991 |
Arthur's bank won't extend his already large overdraft, the telephone and electricity in the lock-up have been cut off and the local council won't let him fly a special flag on the flagpole in his car lot. Then Mrs Daley disappears without a word. While Arthur is taken to court by the council, Morley and Park investigate his wife's disappearance. Arthur, defending himself in court, successfully has the case dismissed. But Morley has convinced himself that Arthur has killed his wife and buried her under a concrete slab on the car lot. Mrs Daley finally reappears; she'd decided, without telling anyone, to go to a health farm. The flagpole is re-erected, but then nicked. (The title spoofs the 1962 film What Ever Happened to Baby Jane?.) Guest stars: Sydney Livingstone as Bert Daley, Lill Roughley as Doreen Daley, George Costigan as Billy, Cherry Gillespie as Lynn, Kevin McNally as Richards, Philip Glenister as Greg Hunt
| 4 | "Three Cons Make a Mountain" | 26 September 1991 |
Three men who have been conned by Arthur decide to pool their resources to get back at him. He's drawn into a card game for big money, and is landed with a Trabant, which is worth very little. Then he bids at an auction, thinking that he's buying furniture but finds himself buying a greyhound that proves to be a non-runner. Then Ray sells a car, taking a piano in part-exchange, thinking it's a rare and valuable item, but it proves to be worth only a hundred pounds. Arthur begins to realise who is behind the con and sets out to turn the tables on them. The greyhound proves its worth at a stud farm, and the car is sold back to the man who sold it to Arthur – at ten thousand pounds. And Arthur presents the piano to the Winchester. (The title spoofs the 1954 film and well-known song Three Coins in the Fountain.) Guest stars: David Ryall as Ashley Brown, Dermot Crowley as Nick Rutherford, Geoffrey Greenhill as Big Mike, Raymond Brody as Bouncing Morry, Allie Byrne as Lucy, Peter Craze as Middleton, Terence Harvey as Auctioneer, David Jackson as Mr. Fletcher, Jonny Lee Miller as Auctioneer's Assistant
| 5 | "Guess Who's Coming to Pinner" | 3 October 1991 |
Arthur is invited to the funeral of big-time gangster Charlie Johnson and the wake afterwards. The funeral is being carefully observed by police and the palatial Johnson home in Pinner is bugged. Police identify Tommy Hambury, a major crook returned after many years abroad and conclude that something major is being planned. Ray starts romancing Joanna, a friend of the family, who is later revealed to be an undercover police officer. Tommy tells Arthur that he has in mind a really major operation – even bigger than The Great Train Robbery – and wants Arthur in on it. But Arthur gets so drunk that next morning, he can't remember what was said. As Arthur desperately tries to remember, even consulting a psychiatrist, consignments of goods start to appear at the lock-up, including armoured Land Rovers, scuba gear and welding equipment – all apparently paid for by Tommy. Finally, Tommy demands a meeting with Arthur at midnight at the end of Southend pier. Revealing that he hadn't actually discussed any details with Arthur, he then falls off the end of the pier and is drowned. So the nature of the proposed operation remains unknown. The following day, Arthur attempts to sell an acquaintance the goods at Tommy's funeral. (The title spoofs the 1967 film Guess Who's Coming to Dinner?) Guest stars: Michael Gambon as Tommy Hambury, Susan Tracy as Mrs Johnson, Gina McKee as Joanna
| 6 | "The Last Temptation of Daley" | 10 October 1991 |
Arthur's doctor wants him to give up alcohol and tobacco if he wants to avoid a stomach ulcer, but this causes Arthur even more stress and he begins to believe that everyone's after him. The feeling is reinforced when building contractor Benny McLeish threatens him over a paint deal that goes sour. Arthur becomes so paranoid that he demands police protection. But Ray has a better idea. (The title spoofs the 1988 film The Last Temptation of Christ.) Guest stars: Andrew McCulloch as Benny McLeish, Terrence Hardiman as Dr Hardman, Roger Brierley as Donald, Arthur Whybrow as Landlord
| 7 | "A Bird in the Hand is Worth Two in Shepherds Bush" | 17 October 1991 |
Bookmaker Stan Sorrell and Billy from Bradford have a £10,000 bet on a pigeon race from London to Bradford. Billy asks Arthur to lend him Ray for this job, so Ray goes to Bradford with Billy. While there, he falls heavily for Sorrell's daughter Donna. Back in London, Ray starts thinking about moving to Bradford to be with Donna. Arthur sets up Donna in a nightclub with "Nostalgic" to break up the budding romance. The race is nearly cancelled when Arthur accidentally releases Billy's pigeon. But all goes well (just) and Billy's pigeon wins the race. Ray returns to Arthur's employ sadder and wiser. (The title spoofs the proverb "A bird in the hand is worth two in the bush".) Guest stars: George Costigan as Billy from Bradford, Willie Ross as Stan Sorrell, Gabrielle Cowburn as Donna Sorrell, Nick Reding as "Nostalgic", Stephen Churchett as Head Waiter, Joe Belcher as Operator
| 8 | "Him Indoors" | 24 October 1991 |
Arthur sets himself up as a "security consultant", selling security alarms to business premises. He recruits Ron the Burglar, a reformed burglar, for his hard-won expertise, but when Ron installs a system on Arthur's lock-up, it immediately malfunctions. Arthur is unable to leave the premises and he's forced to stay there all night. A series of break-ins at premises that have installed Arthur's equipment soon arouse the suspicions of the police and Morley and Park investigate. Ray discovers that Ron has let his old habits get the better of him and he and Ron are arrested. Arthur has to come up with a convincing story to get them off the hook. Guest stars: Simon Rouse as Inspector York, Kenneth Colley as Ron
| 9 | "The Greatest Show in Willesden" | 31 October 1991 |
Arthur and Monty Hinchcliffe book a former music hall act for the "British Volunteer" – retired ventriloquist "Professor Pickford and Mystic Micky". The act goes down well with the punters – but Tommy Pickford has heart trouble and can't continue the act every night. Then some karaoke gear that Arthur's rented from Mrs Gabadini is stolen from his van. He sees dire consequences from admitting its loss to Mrs Gabadini and her sons, but then Ray strikes lucky. He does a deal with dodgy wheeler-dealer club owner Barry to sell the karaoke machine, which he stole, to the Gabadinis. They recognise it as their own equipment, and Arthur is off the hook. (The episode title spoofs Dan Rice's circus (1830s–1860s), first described by an Arkansas paper as "The Greatest Show on Earth".) Guest stars: Steven O'Donnell as Barry the Barrel, John Cater as Tommy Pickford, Harry Landis as Monty Hinchcliffe, Frank Mills as Len, Pauline Letts as Mrs Gabadini, Emma Cunningham as Gloria, James Ottaway as Percy
| 10 | "Too Many Crooks" | 7 November 1991 |
Gangland boss Billy Meadows comes to London from Birmingham for a meet with his estranged brother Vinnie to locate Henri, a French chef who has got his daughter pregnant. Henri is working for "Daley Catering" who are about to cater for a police retirement party. He is kidnapped and returned to Birmingham for a shotgun wedding, but all's not well with Arthur. A police Superintendent at the party is admitted to hospital with possible food poisoning. (The episode title spoofs the proverb "Too many cooks spoil the broth".) Guest stars: Trevor Byfield as Billy Meadows, David Sibley as Vinnie Meadows, David Marrick as Henri, Godfrey James as Arnie. (Susannah Corbett appears in several scenes as Billy's daughter Sadie, but never speaks.)
| 11 | "The Odds Couple" | 14 November 1991 |
Former casino owner Lewis Nelson gives Ray the job of making sure that his wife Lorna, a compulsive gambler, doesn't visit a casino (where she habitually makes a loss). But she persuades Arthur to do her gambling for her, using her money and her "system". Arthur is initially successful but then the system instructions disappear and he starts losing heavily. To make matters worse, the flirty Lorna escapes Ray's care and turns up at the casino. Lewis steals back Lorna's losses and suspicion falls on Arthur, who contrives to pay the money back to the casino by deliberately losing. (The episode title spoofs the 1978 film The Odd Couple.) Guest stars: Lee Montague as Lewis Nelson, Hetty Baynes as Lorna Nelson, Joseph Long as Carlo, Neale Goodrum as Irksome Eric
| 12 | "The Coach That Came in from the Cold" | 21 November 1991 |
DS Morley is ordered to sell a police bus to Arthur so that their accounts will balance. The latter starts using it for tourist purposes; taking punters through "The London The Tourist Never Sees". The bus breaks down and the whole tour ends up at the Winchester. They become spectators at a fight between Denny Willis and Ray, which pleases them greatly and they are satisfied to have had their money's worth. In the meantime, Arthur is trying to join an exclusive golf club. Ray assists the club's catering manageress to expose the current captain's underhand scheme to sell the club's land for executive apartments. Arthur is also being hounded by Denny Willis, to whom he owes a rather large sum of money. (The episode title spoofs the 1965 film The Spy Who Came in from the Cold.) Guest stars: Trevor Peacock as "Previous", Geoffrey Whitehead as Superintendent Roden, Lisa Jacobs as Lorraine, Patrick Godfrey as Major Beatty, Rory Edwards as Denny Willis, Clive Kneller as Rambo. (Stephen Tompkinson as DC Park is credited, but does not actually appear in this episode.)
| 13 | "The Cruel Canal" | 25 December 1991 |
When his van breaks down, Arthur resorts to canals to transport a cargo of stolen video players to a fence known as "Two-Tone". He rents a narrowboat and he and Ray proceed to take the goods from Greenford to Limehouse via the Grand Union Canal and Regent's Canal. As they near their destination, the boat gets stuck under a low bridge. Then they ram at speed into the jetty and the goods are lost in the canal. In the meantime, Arthur is being dogged by ex-boxer Big Dai who thinks that Arthur has nicked his precious collection of boxing videos. (The episode title spoofs the 1953 film The Cruel Sea.) Guest stars: Neil Phillips as "Two-Tone", Anthony O'Donnell as Big Dai, Cathy Murphy as Vicky, Trevor Cooper as Derek, Michael Goldie as Freddie

=== Series 9 (1993) ===
- Broadcast 7 January 1993 – 1 April 1993 (ITV)
- Regular cast: George Cole as Arthur Daley, Gary Webster as Ray Daley, Glynn Edwards as Dave Harris

| No. in series | Title | Original release date |
|---|---|---|
| 1 | "I'll Never Forget Whats'ername" | 7 January 1993 |
Marty "Brains" Goldblum, serving a sentence at an open prison, escapes and turns to Arthur for help. Knowing Marty's vast knowledge, Arthur decides to use him as a team member in a pub quiz. But Marty has a minor nervous breakdown and can't go through with the quiz. Ray persuades him to give himself up to police, which he does. The quiz is under way with only Dave and Arthur competing and they're losing heavily. Almost at the last moment, Ray turns up with DC Field (who owes him a favour) and their combined knowledge puts them equal with the opposition. With one tiebreaker to go, Arthur has the answer – identifying a piece of music played by Albert Sandler – and wins for the Winchester. (The episode title spoofs the 1967 film I'll never forget What's 'Isname.) Guest stars: Allan Corduner as Marty Goldblum, Kenneth Cranham as Walter, John Barrard as Baths Attendant
| 2 | "No Way to Treat a Daley" | 14 January 1993 |
Arthur starts using advertising balloons, but businessman Tony Pike sees himself as having cornered the market for balloons, and sends Warren, his minder, to kidnap Arthur. He takes him to an abandoned power station near the banks of the Thames for "a night on the marshes" – a night of psychological torture followed by maiming by his thugs. While Ray and Les (who's also suffered at Pike's hands) try to track down Arthur, the latter manages to establish a rapport with Warren. He allows Arthur to escape and when Ray arrives, he meets only Pike, whom he finds to be really a coward. Warren is now a changed man with a new outlook on life, thanks to Arthur's philosophy. (The episode title spoofs the 1968 film No Way to Treat a Lady.) Guest stars: Philip Martin Brown as Tony Pike, Desmond McNamara as Les, Richard Ridings as Warren
| 3 | "Uneasy Rider" | 21 January 1993 |
Arthur starts a motorbike courier business, "The Daley Post", using very secondhand equipment and employing moonlighting bikers, including "Rabbit", the longest-established bike courier in London. Many of their customers are passed onto them by the Warnock brothers, ostensibly as they want to wind back their own business. However, Ray smells a rat; many of the delivery addresses don't exist, and some of the undeliverable parcels are found to contain forged passports, tickets and cash. Before the police can get onto them, the business is quickly closed down, and a plan devised to get back at the brothers who have set them up. (The episode title spoofs the 1969 film Easy Rider.) Guest stars: Brian Hibbard as "Rabbit", Ian Bartholomew as Ralphy, Nick Dunning as Keef, Elaine Lordan as Trish, Annie Lambert as Laura Kaye, Jeff Rawle as Jehovah's Witness
| 4 | "Looking for Mr. Goodtime" | 28 January 1993 |
While searching for car dealership Good Time Motors, Arthur is arrested for kerb crawling, soliciting a prostitute and assaulting a police officer. Despite DS Morley's opinion that Arthur would be incapable of such offences, DS Tomkins is determined to proceed with the case. Arthur insists on defending himself in court. As the trial proceeds, Ray seeks out the elusive Good Time Motors and eventually finds the premises under an out-of-date sign. He persuades the owner to appear in court as a defence witness, and the prosecution withdraw all charges. (The episode title spoofs the 1977 film Looking for Mr Goodbar.) Guest stars: Jim Carter as Tomkins, René Zagger as Stuart, Colin Jeavons as Lockwood, Arthur's lawyer, David Belcher as Tony Goodtime, Alan Rowe as Magistrate, Colin Spaull as John
| 5 | "Opportunity Knocks and Bruises" | 4 February 1993 |
Arthur sells some surplus stock to Alexei Nolan, a fairground owner, in exchange for a slot machine, but takes the wrong machine. He discovers that it's full of Irish money, and realises that Nolan is laundering part of the proceeds from a mint robbery some years previously. Arthur manages to persuade DS Morley of his innocence and an operation is set up to arrest Nolan and his cronies. (The episode title refers to the saying "Opportunity knocks but once" and spoofs the television series Opportunity Knocks.) Guest stars: Sean McGinley as Alexei Nolan, Natalie Roles as Amanda, Chris Matthews as Cecil
| 6 | "Gone with the Winchester" | 11 February 1993 |
Toby "Jug" Johnson is released from prison after many years and a drunken reunion begins at the Winchester between him, Arthur and Dave, who were members of the same gang in their youth, the "Brentford Backhanders". Arthur begins to suspect that Dave is setting up a rival business with another gang member, and they fall out – so Arthur starts a rival club and a price war erupts. Ray is eventually able to arrange a mediation, and peace is restored. (The episode title spoofs the 1939 film Gone With the Wind.) Guest stars: James Booth as Toby "Jug", Frank Mills as Len, Sidney Livingstone as Bert
| 7 | "How to Succeed in Business without Really Retiring" | 18 February 1993 |
Arthur decides to retire and leaves Ray in charge. He is initially successful, computerising the records and expanding business, but he doesn't have Arthur's hard-won knowledge of people and their habits. Ray falls victim to a sting operation involving jewellery, and Arthur, who's become bored with retirement anyway, returns to the business to sort out the mess. (The episode title spoofs the 1967 film How to Succeed in Business Without Really Trying.) Guest stars: Liz Fraser as Delilah, John Normington as Hapless Harry, John Halstead as Norman, Helen Masters as Janice
| 8 | "The Roof of All Evil" | 25 February 1993 |
Seeing the fashion for television satellite dishes, Arthur employs Logie Lawson, a self-trained electronics "expert", to install ex-East German army dishes – but the instructions are all in German and they mess up their first job. They get an order to install one on the house of "Fingers" Rossetti, who has a very bad reputation and a very short temper. The installation goes badly wrong and both Arthur and Logie, who has a fear of heights, are stranded on the roof. Meanwhile, Ray gets involved in Rosetti's daughters tangled love-life. (The title refers to the Biblical line, "The love of money is the root of all evil".) Guest stars: Pete Postlethwaite as Eric "Logie" Lawson, Philip Locke as Franco "Fingers" Rosetti, Liza Walker as Isabella Rosetti
| 9 | "Last Orders at the Winchester" | 4 March 1993 |
To celebrate Dave's 25 years at the Winchester, Arthur offers to get the club redecorated. He gives the job to "Heart Attack" – but the latter promptly breaks through a bearing wall and the club is forced to close down. To raise the money for repairs, Arthur organises a fundraiser football match against a police team, refereed by DS Morley. Then "Heart Attack", who'd vanished, reappears and hands over the money for the repairs, which he's stolen from Vic, a rival club owner and police informer. To allay police suspicions, an auction is held in order to "launder" the money. Guest stars: Geoffrey Hutchings as Heart Attack, Gavin Richards as Vic, James Saxon as Harry, George Sweeney as Little Pete, George Raistrick as Monty, Basil Moss as Vicar
| 10 | "Cars and Pints and Pains" | 11 March 1993 |
After not selling a car for several weeks, Arthur decides to rent them out instead. This ploy is successful, and soon all but one have been rented – including Arthur's own Daimler. One punter is late in returning his Vauxhall Cavalier, and Ray and his friend Winston are forced to repossess it. This leads to accusations of theft, especially when the one car left on the lot – a MK2 Ford Cortina that Arthur has to drive – is found to have been stolen. Arthur's car is tracked by police while it is driven around the country, but is finally returned to the car lot. (The title spoofs the 1965 hit song "Trains and Boats and Planes".) Guest star: Deobia Oparei as Winston
| 11 | "The Great Trilby" | 18 March 1993 |
A private detective, Bill McCabe, arrives from Australia to investigate a claim that Arthur is heir to a fortune left by a distant relative, Joshua Daley, who's died intestate. Ray and Arthur carry out some genealogical research at the Family Records Centre (then located at St. Catherine's House and now merged with the National Archives), and also search parish records. They finally locate what appears to be clinching evidence of Arthur's claim to be the last surviving descendant of the deceased's family. But the executors require the inheritor to be "of good character", and Arthur has just been charged with unauthorised use of parking infringement notices (which are also forged). With big money at stake, Ray prevails upon DC Field to persuade DS Morley to drop the charges. On Arthur's promise to pay a sum equivalent to the probable fine into police benevolent funds, Morley does so. Arthur and Ray receive business-class tickets to Australia to claim the inheritance. (The title spoofs the 1925 novel and subsequent film The Great Gatsby.) Guest stars: Simon Chilvers as Bill McCabe, Frank Baker as Spiky
| 12 | "A Taste of Money" | 25 March 1993 |
Expecting a massive windfall from his unknown Australian relative, Arthur prepares to fly to Sydney with Ray. On arrival, they are met by Bill McCabe and booked into an expensive hotel. At the lawyer's office, they discover that there are several claimants to the estate of great-uncle Joshua Daley. Arthur and Ray visit the Daley estate; Paradise Springs; a largely derelict homestead on several thousand acres of outback land – land that's potentially valuable for grazing and possibly mineral rights. But a crooked businessman wants to get his hands on it and sends in another claimant with fake identity and documents. In the event, Joshua's legitimate son (there were several illegitimate children) is the recipient of the estate. Arthur now discovers that he has been given only one-way flight tickets and is also unable to meet his massive hotel bill. (The title spoofs the 1958 play and subsequent film A Taste of Honey.) Guest stars: Simon Chilvers as Bill McCabe, Bill Hunter as Reid, Nikki Coghill as Susan Hamilton
| 13 | "For a Few Dollars More" | 1 April 1993 |
Marooned in Sydney and unable to pay their hotel bills or airfares home, Ray and Arthur move into a cheap backpackers hostel. Ray gets some bar work and Arthur falls in with Derek Collins and his daughter Robyn, small-time street dealers and receivers of stolen goods, whose methods he is very familiar with. He starts street trading himself and makes some money, but the police soon catch up with him. Glad to see the back of him, they give him forty-eight hours to leave Australia. Then Reid mistakes Arthur for a rival big-time drug smuggler, and gives him twenty-four hours to get out of town. By now, they've raised enough to pay their bills and with Robyn's help get a free stand-by courier airfare to London and thankfully fly home. (The title refers to the 1965 film For a Few Dollars More.) Guest stars: Bill Hunter as Reid, Roy Billing as DS Davis, Terry Gill as Derek Collins, Danielle Spencer as Robyn Collins, Mark Strickson as Swan

=== Series 10 (1994) ===
- Broadcast 6 January 1994 – 10 March 1994
- Regular cast: George Cole as Arthur Daley, Gary Webster as Ray Daley, Glynn Edwards as Dave Harris

| No. in series | Title | Original release date |
|---|---|---|
| 1 | "A Fridge Too Far" | 6 January 1994 |
To sell a consignment of mopeds to The Pizza Man (an unseen character), Arthur gets involved in complicated money-juggling. He has pawned his wife's jewellery to fund the purchase, but instead uses the cash to buy a lorry-load of fridge-freezers at a knockdown price. But when one of them is proved to be faulty and nearly burns down the house of Mervyn Krawitz, who was the planned supplier of the said mopeds, Mervyn withholds them and Arthur's stuck. To get liquid again, he fakes a robbery and then a fire. The fridge-freezers, all of which are faulty anyway, go up in smoke, the insurance company (reluctantly) pay up, and the money goes to pay for the mopeds to be sold to The Pizza Man. But how will he redeem the jewellery before "Er Indoors" finds out? (The title spoofs the 1977 film A Bridge Too Far.) Guest stars: Linal Haft as Mervyn Krawitz, Dilys Watling as Maureen Krawitz, Lesley Duff as Lucy Conti, Tony Steedman as Tewkesbury, Shaun Dingwall as Wayne, Jim McManus as Brian, Christopher Owen as Mr. Gordon
| 2 | "Another Case of Van Blank" | 13 January 1994 |
To take advantage of new rules concerning duty-free alcoholic drinks, Arthur, Ray and Dave take a van to Calais, planning to stock up on cheap booze. While Ray and Dave go to a hypermarket, Arthur has a meet with Henry/Henri, a former mate, and gets unwittingly drawn into breaking into a liquor warehouse. Arrested by French police who don't believe his story, he spends the night in jail. Meanwhile, Ray asks Madeleine, an attractive café owner who thought Arthur was a former British soldier she had an affair with in the War, to assist. They manage to convince the sceptical police that Arthur is innocent and this is confirmed when Henry turns himself in. In the meantime, the liquor from the hypermarket is stolen from the van. They return broke and empty-handed to Dover, where customs, seeing an empty van, suspect drug trafficking and start to dismantle the vehicle. Guest stars: Mylène Demongeot as Madeleine, Olivier Pierre as Inspector Rochelle, David Simeon as Henry Saunders, Peter Cleall as Wally, John Leeson as Passport Officer
| 3 | "All Things Brighton Beautiful" | 20 January 1994 |
Businessman Sydney Myers has himself transported in a packing case to Arthur's lockup. He had paid a skinhead to murder him after learning that he had terminal cancer, but when the diagnosis was proved false, he has tried to keep clear of the potential murderer. Arthur spirits him away to Brighton in a caravan to hide him, but the caravan catches fire and is lost over a cliff. Both he and Arthur are now bereft of any money or documents. Arthur can't even contact Ray and in desperation they turn to the Salvation Army, who feed and house them. They meet a recently released prisoner and psychopath Bernie the Bosh, who Sydney fears is out to kill him, but he's reformed and become a Born Again Christian. The trio celebrate by joining in the singing of Onward, Christian Soldiers at the Salvation Army hostel. (The title spoofs the Anglican hymn All Things Bright and Beautiful.); Guest stars: Andrew Sachs as Sidney Myers, Peter Kelly as Bernie the Bosh, Sheila Steafel as Sadie Myers Note: This episode was listed by TV Times as the 100th episode of Minder (not counting the 1983 Minder's Christmas Bonus).
| 4 | "One Flew Over the Parents' Nest" | 27 January 1994 |
While his parents are on holiday in Spain, Ray, driving Bert's taxi, picks up Susie, an attractive girl who claims to be on the run from a violent husband. Arthur, scenting a "nice little earner", installs her in Bert and Doreen's house. She starts working from the house, claiming to be a market researcher, but is a prostitute on the run from Manchester police. She has had some very high-profile clients and fears not only the police but a gang of thugs. And to top it all, Arthur is arrested for running a brothel. (The title spoofs the 1975 film One Flew Over the Cuckoo's Nest.) Guest stars: Susannah Doyle as Susie, John Bowler as DI Styles, Tony Robinson as Willie the Weed, Bernard Kay as Cronin, Martyn Whitby as Aldridge
| 5 | "The Immaculate Contraption" | 3 February 1994 |
A nun buys an Austin Allegro from Arthur's car lot, despite Arthur knowing it's clapped out and overpriced. Then things start going wrong with his attempts to supply equipment – Jacuzzis – to Björn, the manager at Jorgensen's new stress reduction clinic. He's convinced that divine retribution is to blame and sends Ray to the convent with instructions to put the car in good order – whatever the cost. The clinic equipment is duly installed and starts working the very moment Jorgensen arrives from America. Arthur believes that he's been vindicated. (The title spoofs the Madonna album The Immaculate Collection, itself a spoofing of Roman Catholic belief the Immaculate Conception.) Guest stars: Metin Yenal as Björn, Frances Cuka as Sister Angelica, Edda Sharpe as Sister Virginia, Peter Shorey as Hacksaw Harry, Kevork Malikyan as Chico, Jerry Harte as Jorgensen
| 6 | "All Quiet on the West End Front" | 10 February 1994 |
Arthur takes over a booth at a Business Expo, and sets up as a provider of services to busy executives – West End theatre visits, casinos, hard-to-get tickets for booked out shows etc. The initial attempt is a disaster, but another one goes fairly well with satisfied customers. This arouses the ire of another whose ideas he's pinched. Ray is drawn into a fight with a hyperactive casino owner and also tries unsuccessfully to romance the Expo manageress. This arouses the jealousy of his current girlfriend, a jazz singer. (The title spoofs the 1930 film All Quiet on the Western Front.) Guest stars: Ian McNeice as Hargreaves, Natascha McElhone as Vanessa, Samantha Janus as Marian Prince
| 7 | "The Great Depression of 1994" | 17 February 1994 |
Ray's Uncle Brian is suffering from what appears to be deep depression and won't talk to anyone about it. Arthur seeks advice from a successful businessman who suffers similarly but has managed to live with it. Meanwhile, he sells a car to a punter, a retired Detective Inspector, who also has depression since being dismissed for corruption. The man returns to the Winchester, on which site the house he was born in once stood, locks himself in the toilet and refuses to come out. Despite his newly found knowledge, Arthur can't communicate with him and has to call police and a doctor to get him out. (Title spoofs the Great Depression of 1929, which was a severe worldwide economic depression that began in 1929 and lasted throughout the 1930s.); Guest stars: Peter Jones as ex-DI Henry Keys, Barry Jackson as Brian, Amelda Brown as Heather, James Warrior as DS Richard Rogerson, Robert Stephens as Percy Vallins NOTE: Barry Jackson previously appeared as "Mournful Morris" in the episode "If Money Be The Food of Love, Play on".
| 8 | "On the Autofront" | 24 February 1994 |
A price war has erupted and the "gentleman's agreement" between Daley Motors and the former owner of a nearby car dealership is violated after moneylender Don Gedley takes over. Arthur attempts to increase business by radio advertising, but can only afford to use amateur announcers on a local pirate radio station. Grant Gedley, a thrusting young executive determined to prove himself to his father, tries to sabotage Arthur by setting him up with police on hit-and-run charges. Anxious to keep the peace and equally anxious to keep his son out of trouble, Don proposes that Arthur pleads guilty to all charges, in return for paying his fine. However, Grant won't cooperate, and violence is the result. (The title spoofs the 1954 film On the Waterfront.) Guest stars: Godfrey Jackman as Don Gedley, Perry Fenwick as Grant Gedley, Jim Carter as DS Tomkins, Ian Thompson as Trevor Carson
| 9 | "Bring Me the Head of Arthur Daley" | 3 March 1994 |
Violent bank robber Charlie Knowles, a life prisoner, has decided to get even with his former partners who all received lighter sentences. Phelan, his former quartermaster and "outside man" sets them all up and they get extra jail time. Arthur, who sold him the getaway car that broke down and allowed police to arrest them, is set up on dangerous driving charges and cops a sentence of 100 hours community service. Despite the evidence, DS Rogerson isn't convinced of Arthur's guilt and Ray helps him to expose the set-up. It emerges that Phelan, who originally "cooperated" with police, also double-crossed Knowles. Phelan is arrested, but Knowles dies in prison. (The title spoofs the 1974 film Bring Me the Head of Alfredo Garcia.) Guest stars: Stratford Johns as Knowles, Kenneth Cope as Phelan, James Warrior as DS Rogerson, Phyllida Law as Magistrate, Jack Watson as Hammer Callaghan, Alan Ford as Bennett, Desmond McNamara as Gossip, Sebastian Abineri as Prison Officer, Tim Munro as Doctor, Jeff Nuttall as Rossitor, Tim Potter as Lionel, Stephen Tate as DC Fitzgibbon
| 10 | "The Long Good Thursday" | 10 March 1994 |
Café owner Luigi is opening a mafia-themed restaurant, the "Cosa Noshtra" with Arthur's financial backing. On the evening before the grand opening, "Cranky Frankie" Connor escapes from prison and holds Arthur at gunpoint in his lockup. He demands to see Rosie, his wife, whom he suspects of having an affair with Luigi. Luigi's wife Carla also has her suspicions. After a night in the lockup, Arthur persuades Frankie, now angry and highly emotional, to be driven to the Winchester to have it out with Rosie. But Rosie will have none of it and informs the police. Arthur is arrested for harbouring Frankie and Dave and Ray are also arrested. In the end, they are driven off in a police van, with Arthur bemoaning his fate. (The title spoofs the 1980 film The Long Good Friday.) Guest stars: Matthew Scurfield as Frankie, Chris Sanders as Luigi, Mary Maddox as Carla, Jean Warren as Rosie

=== Series 11 (2009) ===
| No. in series | Title | Directed by | Written by | Original release date | Viewers (millions) |
|---|---|---|---|---|---|
| 1 | "Better the Devil You Know" | David Innes Edwards | Tim Loane | 4 February 2009 | 2.90 |
"Businessman" Archie Daley, nephew of Arthur, is being leaned on by the deeply unpleasant Gold brothers, a pair of property developers, to bribe single mother Petra Bennett whose pub stands in the way of their planned local redevelopment scheme. Councillor Conway, a bent politician, also stands to gain by the scheme. Archie meets Jamie, a young taxi driver down on his luck and tries to rope him in to the plan. Jamie, however, has scruples and persuades Archie to concoct an elaborate scheme, which will expose the villains to D.I. Murray.
| 2 | "In Vino Veritas" | David Innes Edwards | Tim Loane | 11 February 2009 | 2.08 |
Archie agrees to provide the wine for the wedding of Roxy, the daughter of old school chum Maurice. Maurice fears that Neil, the groom, might stand Roxy up so Jamie is employed to stalk him and discovers him in conversation with Teddy B, a notorious loan shark. Things do not look good, especially when Neil fails to turn up for his own wedding. Archie and Jamie track him down and find that he is not in debt; Teddy B is his father whom he wanted to keep away from the wedding. On the other hand it is the apparently successful Maurice who owes money to the loan shark. He is bankrupt and suicidal and it is down to Archie to stop him killing himself.
| 3 | "The Art of the Matter" | David Innes Edwards | Tim Loane | 18 February 2009 | 1.59 |
While buying furniture from financially stretched pensioners Anita and Brian Richardson, Archie discovers a piece of graffiti on the bedroom wall-paper which he has authenticated as being the work of Banksy, who was once the Richardsons' lodger. He displays it at a tatty art exhibition of his own where a glamorous gallery employee tells him it is worth a fortune and exhibits it for him. Unfortunately the Richardsons come clean to Archie, explaining that it is one of many forgeries perfected by Brian and given to a middle man whom they only know as "Picasso" who sold them on for them. When things got uncomfortable, thanks to the earnest fraud officer Inspector Willoughby, Picasso disappeared. Willoughby now believes he knows the identity of "Picasso" – Archie Daley. Jamie must retrieve the false Banksy from the gallery before the deception is discovered.
| 4 | "A Matter of Life and Debt" | David Innes Edwards | Tim Loane | 25 February 2009 | 1.81 |
Archie attends the reading of the will of a former business associate, Harry Grant, who owed him several thousand pounds. Almost all of Harry's money is to be left to his beloved cats, annoying his ex-wife Liz, son Hugo and young Irish widow Maria. Archie believes that Harry hid some stolen diamonds before he died but none of the interested parties claim to know of their whereabouts. A visit to sham medium Vlad the Impostor gives Archie a clue that the diamonds were "worn by girls". Harry referred to his cats as his girls, and the one he loved most died recently, and was buried in a graveyard. Maria recalls that Harry may have buried the cat in a diamond-studded collar, so everyone rushes to be the first to get to the cat's last resting place.
| 5 | "Thank Your Lucky Stars" | Karl Neilson | Jeff Povey | 4 March 2009 | 1.36 |
Archie is invited to play poker with millionaire Felix Cornell after arranging the security for a charity fashion show given by Felix's trophy wife Eve. Inevitably he loses and must hand over a Porsche he is "minding" for a thuggish friend, due to arrive in London in a few days. He passes Jamie, a good card player, off as Mr. De Lisle for a return game at the Cornells' mansion. The game begins badly but certain revelations lead to Eve saving the day for Archie and Jamie.
| 6 | "Till Debt Do Us Part" | David Innes Edwards | Tim Loane | 11 March 2009 | 1.34 |
Archie needs cash to stop his estranged wife Delilah exposing his dodgy dealings, and hits upon the perfect revenge plan. Jamie, a former boxing champion, will train wannabe Ryan Doyle to beat up-and-coming fighter Carlo Rocks, Delilah's toy-boy, in the boxing ring – and Archie will bet on the victory. Delilah gets Ryan out of the way, and it is down to Jamie to replace him in the ring – though he is horrified to learn that Archie expects him to lose. Ultimately, Archie must ask Delilah for a favour to keep his young minder on board.
