= Frank Mills (British actor) =

English actor (1927–2021)

- Publicity photo of Mills
- Born: Albert Frank Mills; 11 August 1927; London, England
- Died: 11 February 2021 (aged 93)

Albert Frank Mills (11 August 1927 – 11 February 2021) was an English actor. He starred in numerous films and television series such as Rumpole of the Bailey. He was best known for his television work, notably the role of Billy Williams in Coronation Street.

== Biography ==
=== Early life ===
Mills was born in London, England, in 1927.

=== Career ===
During the 1970s Mills appeared as the fraudulent medium Mr Tyson in The Treasure of Abbot Thomas (1974), as chip shop proprietor Len Holmes, in The Sweeney episode "May" (1976) and as paedophile Reginald Barton in the Granada Television daytime series, Crown Court, the episode entitled "Common Sense" (1978).

Further television appearances during the 1980s saw him appear as Commissionaire Peterson in 'The Blue Carbuncle' episode of The Adventures of Sherlock Holmes in 1984, and Reginald Crump in Miss Marple: A Pocketful of Rye in 1985. Also in 1984 he appeared as Harry Martin, an accountant or book keeper, employed by agoraphobic bookmaker Albert Wendle in the Minder episode Get Daley! He again appeared in Minder in 1991, this time in the episode The Greatest Show in Willesden in which he played Arthur Daley's barber, Len. He also appeared in Channel 5's revival of Minder starring Shane Richie and Lex Shrapnel. Along with Linal Haft and Paul Brooke he is one of only three actors to appear in both the classic series and this reboot, but starring in different roles in each.

In 1997 he played Albert Potter in the Yorkshire Television period drama Heartbeat, the episode entitled "Small Beer."

Mills appeared in television series such as The Brief, Midsomer Murders, Foyle's War, Flambards and The Palace.

Other television appearances have included Season Three of Hetty Wainthropp Investigates playing Frank Wainthropp (1997), and as William Caulder, an ill-treated pensioner in a retirement home who commits suicide in the 2004 The Royal episode "For Better For Worse".

He starred alongside Ray Brooks in the 1984 hit BBC drama Big Deal as the grumpy bookmaker Gil.

== Death ==
Mills died in 2021 at the age of 93.

== Filmography ==
Year	Title	Role	Notes
1977	The Glitterball	Supermarket Manager	Uncredited
1980	Rough Cut	Passport Clerk	
1982	Witness for the Prosecution	Chief Inspector Hearne	
1982	The Missionary	Sir Cyril Everidge	
1984	Champions	Charles	
1985	Parker	Mr. Epps	
1987	Bellman and True	Security Man	
1993	Closing Numbers	Frank	
1995	The Young Poisoner's Handbook	Uncle Jack	
1998	The Tribe	Emily's Father	
2001	Bodywork	Sydney Greengrass	
2002	Mrs Caldicot's Cabbage War	Leslie	
2003	Wondrous Oblivion	Mr. Robinson	
2005	Oliver Twist	Elderly Officer	
