= An Officer and a Car Salesman =

- Written by: Tony Hoare
- Directed by: Roy Ward Baker
- Starring: Dennis Waterman; George Cole
- Country of origin: United Kingdom
- Original language: English

Original release
- Release: 26 December 1988

Related
- Minder on the Orient Express

An Officer and a Car Salesman is a comedy/thriller television film made in 1988 as a spin-off from the successful television series Minder. It was first broadcast on 26 December (Boxing Day) 1988. It falls between Series 6 and Series 7 of Minder, but, like Minder on the Orient Express, which preceded it, it follows a stand-alone storyline. It was the last appearance of Patrick Malahide as Chisholm.

== Plot ==
Terry has been convicted of receiving stolen goods – actually stored in his flat by Arthur – and emerges from prison after serving 16 months, determined to have nothing further to do with Arthur. Meanwhile, Arthur has done well for himself, operating a large warehouse and import/export operation, employing several staff and driving a Rolls-Royce. One of his customers is self-styled 'Colonel' Caplan, who operates a military-style executive survival programme from his country estate.

Terry is recommended for a job as a gardener/handyman on the estate by Angie, an employee of Arthur's. But no one knows that she's actually an under-cover police officer, investigating the possibility of nefarious activities between Arthur and Caplan. These suspicions appear justified when a consignment of CS gas is found in the warehouse, Arthur claiming not to know how it got there.

It emerges that Caplan and his staff are planning a military-style gold bullion robbery. The transport is being guarded by a security company, whose Chief Security Officer is ex-Sergeant Chisholm, and one of the guards is in Caplan's pay.

Investigating further, Arthur, Terry, DS Rycott, DC Jones and Angie are held captive at the estate whilst the robbery goes down. But thanks to the defective equipment supplied by Arthur, it fails and the police manage to get there in time to nab the thieves.

A confrontation with senior police leads to Arthur being stripped of his business interests (and possibly arrest), Chisholm close to a second nervous breakdown, and Rycott and Jones getting a major roasting. Only Terry escapes unscathed.

== Cast ==
- George Cole as Arthur
- Dennis Waterman as Terry
- Glyn Edwards as Dave
- Richard Briers as Caplan
- Diana Quick as Angie
- Patrick Malahide as Chisholm
- Peter Childs as DS Rycott
- Meic Povey as DC Jones
- Garfield Morgan as Superintendent Mason
- Clive Swift as Chisholm's boss
