= Iain Rattray =

British actor

Iain Rattray is a British actor.

He appeared in episodes of The Bill, Howards' Way, Chancer, Casualty, Boon, Minder, Grange Hill, London's Burning, Doctor Who, and Between the Lines, plus the TV MiniSeries Wild Justice and Jack the Ripper.
