= Peter Childs =

English actor (1939–1989)

- Born: 31 August 1939; Eastbourne
- Died: 1 November 1989 (aged 50)
- Occupation: Actor
- Years active: 1965–1989

Peter Childs (31 August 1939 – 1 November 1989) was an English character actor best known for playing Cockney Detective Sergeant Ronnie Rycott, nemesis of Arthur Daley in Minder.

== Biography ==
Childs was born at Eastbourne, East Sussex, on 31 August 1939, and was educated at the local grammar school before training to be an actor. He trained at the Birmingham Theatre School, toiling 10 years doing repertory work before breaking into television, playing a small role in the Anton Rodgers crime series Zodiac. Later Childs gained valuable experience working with the Manchester 59 company, appearing in Erb, a show that transferred to London's West End. He also played a comical undertaker in Joe Orton's Loot to great effect.

A regular performer at the Theatre Royal, Stratford East, Childs gave an outstanding performance in Joan Littlewood's last performance there, So You Want to Be in Pictures. During this time he showed considerable gifts for comedy and improvisation. Childs also appeared in the Royal Court Theatre (and later in the West End) in David Storey's play The Changing Room, which was directed by Lindsay Anderson, who also cast him in the 1973 film O Lucky Man.

On television, Childs' familiar features were seen in The Sweeney, The Onedin Line, Rumpole of the Bailey, Bergerac, Juliet Bravo, Ever Decreasing Circles and Blakes 7. He also appeared in a host of other dramas, including the first series of spin-off series to BBC children's series Grange Hill, Tucker's Luck. Also Childs featured in two separate appearances in Granada TV's popular soap opera, Coronation Street. Childs had made his name on television a number of years earlier, as Detective Ron Gash in the final series of Public Eye, transmitted in 1975. The following year he was cast as Det. Sgt Donald Grant in the final series of the long-running BBC police series Softly, Softly: Task Force. But it was the programme Minder that made Childs a household name in Great Britain. In the hugely popular series, his character had a burning desire to see Arthur Daley, played by George Cole, behind bars.

Other movie appearances by Childs include Sweeney!, Ellis Island, If You Go Down in the Woods Today, An Officer and a Car Salesman and most memorably Minder on the Orient Express, where he reprised his role as Ronnie Rycott.

In his personal life Childs was a fervent fan of racecourses and greyhound stadiums.

Childs died of leukaemia aged 50, on 1 November 1989.
