= James Coombes (actor) =

British actor (born 1956)

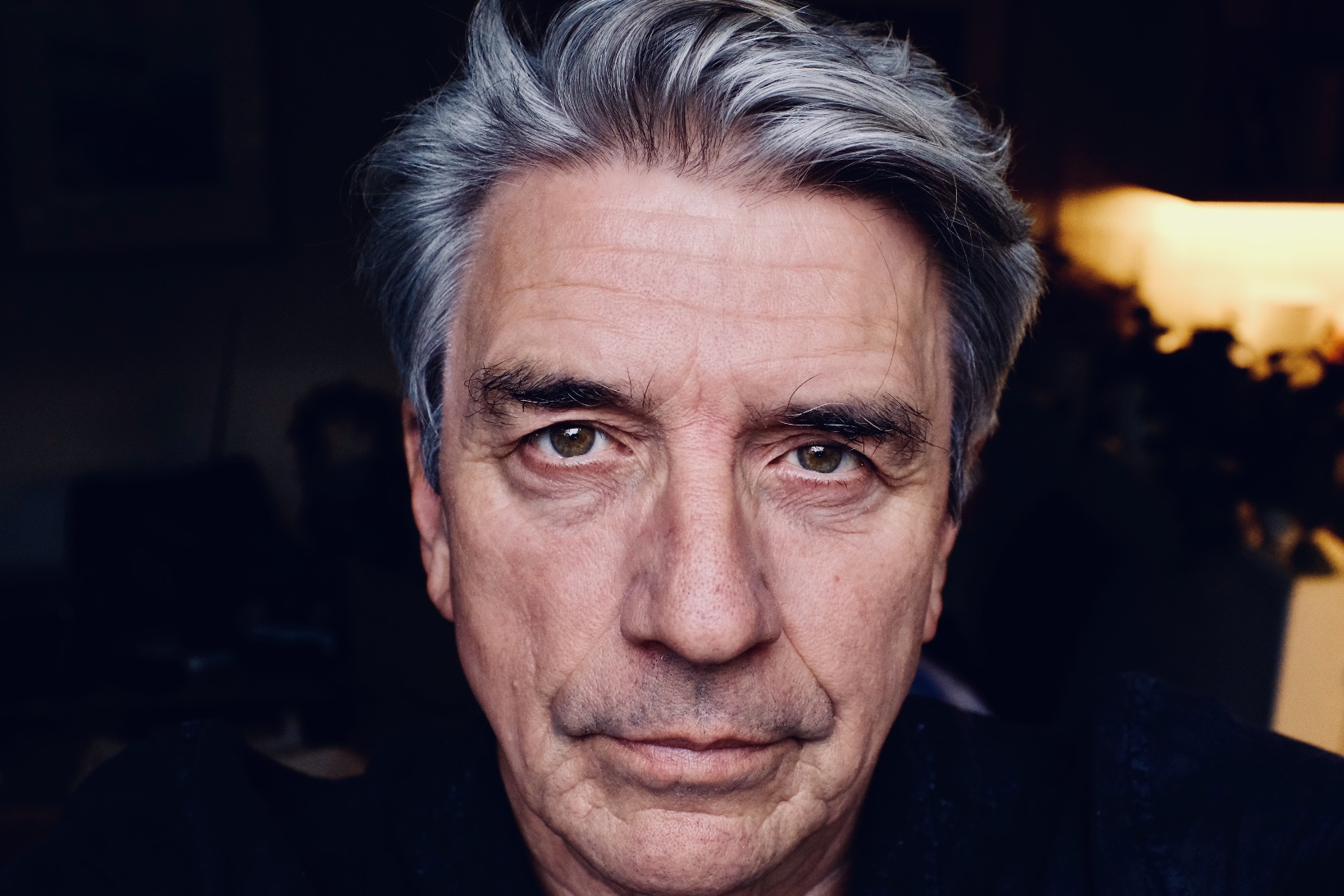
- Born: James Southey Coombes; 8 October 1956 (age 69); Newport, Monmouthshire, Wales
- Occupation: Actor
- Notable work: Robin of Sherwood as Grendel
- Spouse: Cathy Finlay (m. 1989)
- Children: 3

James Coombes (born 8 October 1956 in Newport, Monmouthshire) is a British film, television and theatre actor.

== Early life ==
Coombes trained as an actor at the Birmingham School of Speech and Drama from 1975 to 1978.

== Career ==
Coombes is best known for his roles as Pierre Challon during the final series of the BBC drama Howards' Way, Iain Strathmorris in the long running STV series Take the High Road, and Grendel in HTV's Robin of Sherwood. He also donned the famous black polo top as the iconic Milk Tray Man in the eighties' TV adverts. He appeared as Paroli in the 1984 Doctor Who serial Warriors of the Deep and provided the voice of the Krargs in the lost episode Shada, written by Douglas Adams. He has appeared in many films including Murder with Mirrors co-starring with Bette Davis and Helen Hayes, and played Richard Gere's son, Amnon, in the Bible epic, King David. He also played Sir Lancelot in the Disney film, A Knight in Camelot with Whoopi Goldberg. He appeared in Monarch.

Coombes has worked extensively in the theatre including seasons at Chichester Festival, Pitlochry Festival, Bristol Old Vic, London Young Vic, The Arts Theatre, London, Ludlow Festival, Coventry, Southampton Nuffield and Birmingham Rep.

Other credits include: Minder on the Orient Express, The Country Diary of an Edwardian Lady, Capital City, US mini series Napoleon and Josephine, Boon, The Kenny Everett Television Show, Drop the Dead Donkey, Saracen, Heartbeat, Bugs, Holby City, Starhunter, The Bill, My Family and Dinosapien. He appeared as Paul Deroulard in "The Chocolate Box" episode of Agatha Christie's Poirot, and was Gennaro Lucca in The Memoirs of Sherlock Holmes adventure, "The Red Circle". He recently appeared in a UK and Ireland tour of Dirty Dancing, playing Dr. Jake Houseman following runs at the Piccadilly Theatre, and the Phoenix Theatre, London. He appears as Governor De Rouvray in Knightfall which started broadcasting in December 2017 on History Channel. In January 2018, he directed Hayfever by Noel Coward at ArtsEd London.

As well as acting, Coombes regularly tutors at the Academy of Creative Training in Brighton and guest directs at ArtsEd School of Musical Theatre, and Drama Studio London. He is a trustee for charity Acting for Others which provides support to all theatre workers in times of need. He is also a founding trustee of theatre company Persever Productions Ltd. During the Covid pandemic, Coombes retired from acting and is now a photographer and civil funeral celebrant. He is a member of The Institute of Civil Funerals.

== Personal life ==
In 1989, he married Cathy Finlay, daughter of actor Frank Finlay CBE. They have three children, Josh, Charlotte and Benedict.
