= Martin Fisk =

English actor (born 1946)

- Born: Martin S. Fisk; 28 April 1946 (age 80); London, England
- Occupation: Actor

Martin Fisk (born 28 April 1946 in London) is an English actor.

== Early life ==
Initially he worked as a lorry driver for Rowntrees Mackintosh before become an actor.

From his schooldays at Highgate School and Southgate College, Fisk developed a love for the theatre. He attended Mountview Theatre School in North London whilst studying for his A levels before graduating at the Royal Academy of Dramatic Art.

== Career ==
Fisk has worked extensively in theatre, television and film. became a recognised face when playing a truck driver in a series of commercials for Yorkie chocolate bar. However, he was let go when it turned out he was more popular than the product itself. Nevertheless, the actor was able to find work in many TV shows including:

- Poldark in 1975
- Thriller: The Next Victim (1976)
- A Horseman Riding By in 1978, starring Nigel Havers, and was released on DVD in 2004
- Doctor Who: The Leisure Hive (1980)
- Miss Marple dramatisation of The Moving Finger in 1985

== Personal life ==
Whilst at RADA, Fisk met his wife, Diane Barker (who was studying a stage management course), then personal assistant to the head of a film distribution company. After his graduation in 1971, they were married. She accompanied her husband when he toured with different repertory companies including a year in St Andrews and two years at Newcastle's University Theatre. They are now retired and living in Spain.
