= Minder (TV series) =

British TV comedy-drama series (1979–1994, 2009)

- Original title sequence featuring Dennis Waterman (1979–1989)
- Genre: Comedy drama
- Created by: Leon Griffiths
- Starring: Dennis Waterman (series 1–7); George Cole (series 1–10); Glynn Edwards; Patrick Malahide (series 1–6); Peter Childs (series 1–7); Gary Webster (series 8–10); Shane Richie (series 11); Lex Shrapnel (series 11)
- Country of origin: United Kingdom
- Original language: English
- No. of series: 11
- No. of episodes: 114 (list of episodes)

Production
- Running time: 60 minutes (including commercials)
- Production companies: Euston Films (1979–1994); for Thames (1979–1991); for Central (1993–1994); Talkback Thames (2009)

Original release
- Network: ITV
- Release: 29 October 1979 – 10 March 1994
- Network: Channel 5
- Release: 4 February – 11 March 2009

Minder is a British comedy-drama series about the London criminal underworld. Initially produced by Verity Lambert, it was made by Euston Films, a subsidiary of Thames Television, and shown on ITV for ten series between 29 October 1979 and 10 March 1994.

The series was revived by Channel 5 in 2009 but was discontinued after only six episodes. It was nominated three times for Best Drama Series or Serial at the British Academy Television Awards.

== Plot ==
The first seven series starred Dennis Waterman as Terry McCann, an honest and likeable former boxer turned bodyguard (minder in Cockney parlance), and George Cole as Arthur Daley, a middle-aged chancer and petty schemer, importer/exporter, wholesaler, used-car salesman and purveyor of anything else from which there was money to be made, legally or otherwise.

The series is principally set in working-class west London (specifically Shepherd's Bush, Ladbroke Grove, Fulham and Acton), and was largely responsible for introducing the word minder, meaning personal bodyguard, into the UK popular lexicon. The characters often drank at the local members-only Winchester Club, where owner and barman Dave Harris (Glynn Edwards) acted, often unwittingly, as a messenger for Arthur, and turned a blind eye to his shady deals.

=== Series 1–7 ===
Although initially developed to focus on Terry's character, equal prominence was allotted to Arthur and his dodgy dealings as the series progressed. Barman Dave Harris at first made only occasional appearances, but the character also became popular and by the second series Dave was featured more prominently as well. The opening sequence of Series 7 was changed slightly to include shots of Terry, Arthur and Dave at the Winchester, and Edwards was given his own billing rather than remaining among the guest cast.

=== Series 8–10 ===
In 1989, after filming the seventh series, Waterman left the cast, feeling that the character had run its course and that it was becoming harder for the writers to come up with plots as sharp as the earlier series. Minder returned in 1991 with another character replacing Terry. Waterman's final episode, Series 7's coincidentally titled "The Wrong Goodbye", was filmed before Waterman announced his departure from the series, so there was no mention in the episode of Terry's forthcoming departure either. In the opening episode of series 8, "The Loneliness of the Long Distance Entrepreneur", Arthur finds Terry has married and emigrated to Australia to finally escape his influence. At the same time, he is stuck with looking after his nephew Ray Daley (Gary Webster), at the request of Arthur's brother, to give him employment and keep him out of trouble.

With Terry gone, local undesirables start to muscle in on Arthur, but it soon emerges that Ray is able to handle himself in a tight situation, so Arthur appoints him his new "minder". Ray is well spoken, well educated (O-level French and woodwork) and less likely to be called upon as a pugilist, as fights were far less frequent and graphic than in the show's early episodes. He dresses snappily in designer suits, prefers mineral water or a soft drink to a pint of ale, but lacks his own car, usually relying upon the beaten-up old blue Ford Transit van from Arthur's lockup.

The original theme tune was replaced by a rock-style instrumental version, credited to "Kenny" (Gerard Kenny). By this stage, the grittier elements of the early series had been toned down in favour of the comedic aspects of Arthur's dodgy dealings. Waterman praised Gary Webster for fitting into the series, but remained vocal in his comments that the series was no longer about a "minder", and that the revamped version should go under a different title, reflecting its reorientation to Arthur.

Other new characters were Sidney Livingstone (who had previously appeared as a casino bouncer in the episode, "You Lose Some, You Win Some") as Bert Daley, Arthur's gullible brother and Ray's father, who views Arthur as a successful businessman rather than a con man, and entrusts Ray to his care; Bert's wife and Ray's mum, Doreen (Lill Roughley); and Ray's recurring girlfriend Gloria (Emma Cunningham), who is frustrated with Ray being torn between her and Arthur. The new police nemeses were Detective Sergeant Michael Morley (Nick Day), and D.C. Park (Stephen Tompkinson) in series 8, who in turn, was replaced by D.C. Field (Jonty Stephens) in series 9.

At the conclusion of the final episode of Series 10, "The Long Good Thursday", Arthur along with Ray, Dave and crazy prisoner, Frankie (Matthew Scurfield), are finally apprehended by the police who drive them away in a convoy. In a final monologue over closing credits, a bemused Arthur protests that he is a hardworking, upstanding citizen. The following week, a slightly edited version of the first episode, "Gunfight at the O.K. Laundrette" was broadcast. In the introduction, in response to being asked to name his favourite episode, Cole states that "all were of such quality that he could not". He closed with "Goodbye... for now".

=== Series 11 ===
Final title sequence

In 2009, Minder resumed on Channel 5 after a 15-year break. The first episode of the six-part series was broadcast on 4 February. The makers emphasised that it was a revival rather than a remake.

The show focused on Arthur's nephew Archie, played by Shane Richie, and a new minder, Jamie Cartwright, played by Lex Shrapnel. Channel 5 stated that there were no plans for Cole, Waterman or Webster to reprise their roles. The series was produced by Talkback Thames.

In the weeks leading up to the new series, Channel 5 launched a national advertising campaign to promote the show's return. This featured a series of adverts on television and billboards; other promotions included advertisements on taxi receipts, a social networking campaign and branded beer mats, all designed to attract the young male audience Channel 5 was targeting. Although a Christmas episode was initially planned and announced ahead of the intended second series, poor ratings meant that Channel 5 did not commission either.

== Cast and characters ==
=== Terry McCann ===
Terry (Dennis Waterman) is a former professional boxer who has served time in Wormwood Scrubs ("two years for GBH and three for attempted robbery" according to a police sergeant in the first episode, "Gunfight at the OK Laundrette", although other episodes slightly contradict this and the overall details are often quite vague), having served a substantial term because he would not become an informant against his co-accused. With few options, Terry is employed as Arthur's "minder" on vague and ungenerous terms, with it often being hinted that Arthur has manipulated him into this job, and indeed is seen to continue to manipulate Terry throughout the character's run in the series, despite Terry often attempting to find other means of employment and break free from Arthur's control (the later feature-length special "An Officer and a Car Salesman", which leads into Series 7, Terry's last stint in the series, begins with Terry once again inside, this time after being caught with some of Arthur's dodgy merchandise). In Terry and Arthur's final episode "The Wrong Goodbye", it is suggested that one of Terry's prison terms was taken in place of Arthur and explains why Arthur and Terry have a deep bond, though casts Arthur's treatment of Terry in far less flattering light.

In the title sequence, Arthur is shown meeting Terry at the prison gates following his release. He drives a white Ford Capri (though is sometimes seen driving a copper-coloured Capri in some episodes, and a silver Capri in several others). Terry enjoys a drink but usually responsibly, does not smoke and has an eye for the ladies. Despite his incarceration, he is honest, trustworthy and loyal, particularly to Arthur, although the scrapes that Arthur lands him in make him wonder why. He is intelligent and streetwise enough to disperse situations that his role as minder often lands himself, and Arthur or those around him, in, although at the same time is seen not to be strong willed enough to break free of Arthur's often devious ways of keeping their working relationship in place. Terry's romantic interests are far less impressed with Arthur's hold on Terry and frequently suggest that he should break free and make his own path in life (often as a precursor to a deeper relationship). Arthur sees these women as a threat to his workforce and is not averse to breaking up any relationship which may interfere in Terry's availability. While Terry resents this, he is also commitment shy and resists attempts to settle down often, which Arthur exploits through a thinly veiled desire for him to be independent of women.

=== Arthur Daley ===
Arthur Edward Daley (George Cole) is a mid-level professional criminal of mature years, a minor con man eternally involved in dodgy dealings and usually seen puffing Castella Panatella cigars. In the series 3 episode "In", a German police officer reading Arthur's file reveals that Arthur served 18 months in prison during the 1950s but does not reveal the reason. In early episodes he is depicted as more cunning and streetwise, as well as showing an interest in young women. Later his character is softened, becoming more of a cowardly con man than an outright villain and almost prudish about young women. Arthur's exact age is only stated once, in S1, E1, when he tells Terry's date that he is 52 and thus born in 1927. Later, in S2, E6, he is said to have been called up for National Service in 1949, implying a birth year of 1931 (George Cole was born in 1925).

Arthur typically drives an upmarket car; the Jaguar XJ6 being the vehicle the character is most associated with. In the early episodes he drives a 4.2 Series II XJ6. In the latter part of Series 3, Arthur has changed over to a silver Mercedes 280E and in Series 4 he drives a Portland beige Daimler Sovereign 4.2 Series III. Series 7 again sees Arthur driving a silver Jaguar XJ6. As a used car salesman, Arthur occasionally makes use of other cars. In the Series 3 episode "Broken Arrow", he uses a Ford Granada Mk.II. Due to an accident, this car has to be repaired and Arthur is forced to borrow a friend's customised Chevrolet Corvette C3 Stingray that he is trying to sell. Also in Series 3, Arthur uses a brown Jaguar XJR in the episodes "Dead Men Do Tell Tales" and "Looking for Micky". In the Series 7 episode "It's a Sorry Lorry, Morrie", Arthur is down on his luck and has to resort to driving a clapped-out mustard yellow Ford Granada Mk.II. In the episode "A Nice Little Wine" Daley drives, to road test, a pale blue Rover SD1. In the special episode "An Officer and a Car Salesman", Arthur has moved up in the world and drives a yellow Rolls-Royce Silver Shadow. In the later Ray Webster era, he then has a silver Jaguar XJ40.

He survives by his wiles and self-belief, and exploits everyone around him, especially Terry. He is always trying to make extra money, which he often describes as a "nice little earner", and his schemes usually backfire and leave him either in debt to local underworld figures, or with his activities coming under the scrutiny of the police, or occasionally a combination of the two, with Terry ultimately being left to sort out the mess and get him out of trouble. Arthur thinks of himself as an "entrepreneur", but his tailored three-piece suits, Jaguar and social affectations do not disguise his working class origins. Arthur tests Terry's patience with dishonest and doomed schemes to make money, then uses his cunning to persuade Terry to stay with him. In the same way, Arthur manipulates friends such as Dave, the barman (and part owner with Arthur) of the private, downmarket Winchester Club. Most episodes depict Arthur losing or only just breaking even as the result of some scheme going wrong. Arthur owns various businesses outright or is a part-owner as well as partner with Dave in the Winchester, and he also seems to own various rental properties.

Arthur refers to his wife, who never appeared, as "'Er indoors", the implication being that she is a fierce and formidable woman. Arthur is not above bending the law and sometimes attracts the attention of the police. Despite Terry's prison sentence, with an additional oblique reference to "minor misdemeanours in the dim and distant past", he serves as the show's moral conscience, keeping Arthur from straying too far outside the law and persuading him to do the right thing whether Arthur likes it or not. The name Arthur Daley has become synonymous with a dishonest salesman or small-time crook.

With Arthur's dodgy schemes, the duo encounter underworld figures, many of whom turn nasty, leaving Terry to fight and outwit their way out of trouble. For all Arthur's obsession with get-rich-quick schemes, he is never malicious, usually simply being blinded by greed, and the pair often end up putting some other wrong right or helping others in need or who have been done wrong by, even if it proves to be the hindrance to Arthur's latest scheme fully succeeding. Most of Arthur's schemes fail in the end, owing to his incompetence or greed, but he does occasionally have minor victories and puts one over on the law or more serious criminals. Arthur's favourite drink was a large vodka and tonic, which he referred to as a "large VAT", a wordplay on Value Added Tax (the UK tax on sales).

=== Ray Daley ===
After Terry leaves, Arthur is persuaded by his brother Bert to give his son Ray (Gary Webster) a job. Ray is only a few years out of school, reasonably well educated, but directionless and on the fringes of dodgy company (mostly those he went to school with). He is appointed Arthur's "minder" and proves well able to handle the job, although he is also keen to "get into tie-wearing activities". To this end, he finds himself carrying out a wide range of jobs, from car mechanic ('The Immaculate Contraption') to barge navigation ('The Cruel Canal') and satellite dish installation ('The Roof of all Evil'). Unlike Terry, Ray has no police record but that does not stop him being apprehended by police, and Arthur has to talk them into letting him go ('Cars and Pints and Pains'). Ray is a snappy dresser, typically seen in designer suits, and not a heavy drinker, usually seen sipping mineral water or a "Saint Clements" (orange and lemon). Ray does not initially have a driving licence but can handle most vehicles, including the beaten up old blue Ford Transit van from Arthur's lock-up. Like Terry, he has an eye for the ladies but the affairs are usually short. He eventually moves in with Gloria, a professional photographer, but she is frustrated to be playing second fiddle to Ray's sense of duty to Arthur's welfare.

=== Dave Harris ===
Dave (Glynn Edwards) is a childhood friend, part owner (with Arthur) and bar manager of the local, members-only Winchester Club. Arthur and Terry regularly drink there and Dave acts, often unwillingly, as a message service for Arthur, and turns a blind eye to the shady deals being arranged by the patrons. As a counsel and resource of last resort, he on occasion helps Arthur and Terry get out of tight spots through offering advice, money, space at the Winchester to store items or people and reluctantly, personal information through a brother-in-law working in the police. With a trading licence to maintain, he is a wise character keeping the delicate balance of a legitimate private members' drinking establishment and a safe space for the local villains to congregate. Frequently given first refusal on Arthur's dodgy merchandise, he has been offered cars, watches, toast, clothing and various consumer goods. Episodes give snippets of his home life, including his wife Lucy (whose only appearance is in Series 7, episode 2, "Days of Fines and Closures"), daughter Naomi (mentioned in Series 2, episode 10 "The Old School Tie" ), and a dead dog. In a promotional video called 'Number' made for UK Premium Bonds, where both Dennis Waterman and Glynn Edwards reprise their roles as Terry McCann and Dave 'the barman', Dave is referred to as 'Mr Edwards' and not Harris.

=== Police adversaries ===
Given the nature of Arthur's activities and Terry's criminal past, they were always in the spotlight of the local police and crossed paths with several regular and occasional characters:

DS Albert Chisholm; Detective Sergeant Albert "Cheerful Charlie" Chisholm (played by Patrick Malahide) made a brief appearance in the first episode and appeared in 23 more episodes in the first six series. Chisholm frequently arrested Arthur, but was not clever enough to make charges stick. Beginning in Series 3 he was accompanied by:

DC/DS "Taff" Jones; (played by Meic Povey), a Welshman. Although not seeming particularly bright on first sight, Jones often proved mildly sharper than his superior, and was quietly amused by Arthur's frequent humiliation of Chisholm, even occasionally going into the Winchester for a social drink, away from Chisholm's domination. He tolerated the put-downs of his senior officer with "Celtic willpower and a morbid fear of unemployment". Jones was promoted to Detective Sergeant in Series 7, with DC MacDonald (Robin Cameron) as his assistant.

DC/DS Ronald Rycott; Detective Constable Ronald "Kenny" Rycott (played by Peter Childs) made his first appearance in Episode 3, "The Smaller They Are". Rycott previously had a "spot of bother", which prevented him from rising through the ranks, although he later became a detective sergeant. A lone figure, not afraid of violent situations and more than willing to do a bit of "freelance" work, he was frequently on the edge of a nervous attack as Arthur slipped through his fingers. Rycott appeared in 14 more episodes up to the end of Series 7. His regular assistant was:

DC Melish; (Michael Troughton). DC Melish was, like DC Jones, mainly amused at Arthur's activities.

Many episodes in the first seven series featured either Chisholm and Jones or Rycott and Mellish, and the two pairs sometimes appeared together, emphasising the professional rivalry between them, much to the annoyance of their superior officer, Detective (Chief) Inspector Norton (Tony Caunter). This rivalry reached fever pitch in the episode "Around the Corner" (which closed Series 5) when all four officers, in two cars, crashed head-on while attempting to arrest Arthur and Terry. DI Norton's subsequent comments were scathing. Although Norton's appearances were always brief, they demonstrated the personal nature of Chisholm's and Rycott's campaigns. In the Series 6 episode "From Fulham with Love" Norton appears for less than a minute, but spends that entire appearance denouncing Chisholm for his "personal vendetta against Arthur Daley".

In the feature-length episode "An Officer and a Car Salesman" that preceded series 7, Chisholm was written out (he was seen to have taken a job as a security officer), and Jones was promoted to DS. Although he took over the probing of Arthur's plots, he was less hell-bent on nabbing him, finding most of Arthur's schemes humorous.

New police officers appeared from Series 8:

DS Michael Morley; (Nicholas Day). DS Michael Morley was also a highly driven officer, but tempered with a sense of humour that Chisholm lacked. He also failed to make charges against Arthur stand up in court. His assistants were:

DC Park; (Stephen Tompkinson). DC Johnny Park was openly amused at Arthur and Ray's activities, but knew his duty; as did

DC Field; (Jonty Stephens). DC Phil Field was a conscientious officer but he occasionally did Arthur a "good turn";

DS Rogerson; (James Warrior). DS Richard Rogerson was a loyal and tenacious "old school" officer. On occasion he even assisted Ray to prove that Arthur was innocent of police charges.

=== Other characters ===
Arthur's world was mainly populated by petty crooks, fellow minders, dropouts, "tea leaves" (Cockney rhyming slang for "thieves"), "fences" and those happy to quickly turn over dodgy goods, usually (but not always) without violence. Characters that Arthur would interact with regarding his various dodgy dealings included such characters, often memorably named, as fellow car dealer Wally West, Jewish travel agent-cum-undertaker Monty Wiseman, "Dirty 'Arry", eternally glum "Mournful Morris", drunk former surgeon "Incapable", "Self Inflicted Sid", Tic-tac", "Freddy, the Fly", "Tasty Tim", "Scotch Harry", "Maltese Tony", "Confident Clive", "Smudger Harris", a forger of variable talent, unrelated man-with-a-van "Pongo Harris", "Dipso Pete" and "Oily Wragg" (played by Pete Postlethwaite) and Shamy (played by Art Malik).

Recurring characters included Des (George Layton) (series 1–3), a back-street mechanic friend of Terry's who was friendly and likable, but not beyond car theft when called for; professional gambler Maurice Michaelson (Anthony Valentine) (series 1–2), kind-hearted stripper Debbie Mitchell (Diana Malin) and air stewardess Penny (Gennie Nevinson), both recurring girlfriends of Terry's; Ray Winstone as mechanic Arnie (series 4–7, conceived as a replacement for George Layton's Des, and as dim as Des was sharp); and wide boy Justin James (Mark Farmer) (series 5–7), who idolised Arthur and aspired to be like him, seeing him as a kind of godfather. Royce Mills also starred as Arthur's financial adviser, Andrew, whose character appeared in a number of episodes across several series.

As the series progressed, the guest stars became more prestigious, including Derek Jacobi as criminal Freddy Fenton, Brian Glover as Arthur's old army buddy Yorkie, Suzi Quatro as Terry's singer girlfriend Nancy, and Michael Kitchen as "Maltese Tony". Later series starring Cole and Waterman featured Billy Connolly playing Tick-Tack, a bookie and grifter, Brian Blessed as corrupt police officer DI Dyer, Ian McShane as gangster Jack Last, Roy Kinnear as "Fat Charlie" and Andrew Sachs as Sidney.

Indeed, the show gave roles to young actors who have since achieved considerable fame including Brian Cox, Steve McFadden, Peter Capaldi, Bill Nighy, and Leslie Grantham.

Arthur frequently mentioned his wife, who was never named or seen and referred to as "'Er indoors" (Ray would refer to her as "Auntie" in the later series). However, an out-of-focus photograph of bride and groom can be seen in the background of one early episode ('Bury my Half at Waltham Green') in Arthur's flat. Their children are occasionally mentioned in passing but no specific details are ever confirmed.

Rula Lenska, who was married to Dennis Waterman, played a number of roles in the show.

=== 2009 revival characters ===
Archibald "Archie" Daley is the main character in the 2009 revival. It is never specified whether Archie is related to Arthur or not, but in one scene in the final episode, Archie says "If my uncle Arthur could see me now!" In the specially filmed trailer for the upcoming series, Archie mentions his " Uncle Arthur". Like Arthur, he is a "wide" businessman, who likes expensive clothing and cars although his tastes are less traditional. Archie tries to get involved in many types of enterprises usually unsuccessfully. Archie is getting divorced from his wife Delilah at the start of the series, but appears to have no children. He seems to have no qualms about having affairs.

Jamie Cartwright is a newly qualified black cab driver, who is good at defending himself. He is less of a womaniser than either Terry or Ray, but still fancies himself as popular with women. He is the "minder" in this version. His Hackney cab is a major feature in many of the plots.

Petra Bennett is a pub landlady. In the first episode of the revival, Archie calls on Jamie to try and get her to sell up for a development organised by an acquaintance of Archie's. However, they soon come over to her side after her pub is torched. The bar is refitted at Archie's expense and renamed The Winchester. Petra is perhaps the equivalent of Dave from the previous series, but is on better terms with Jamie than Archie. It Is implied that she is the daughter of Dave Harris.

== Production ==
=== Development ===
Minder was devised by writer Leon Griffiths as a vehicle for Dennis Waterman after his success in The Sweeney. George Cole's wheeler-dealer character is almost secondary, with Arthur assigning Terry a new "minding" job in each episode. A number of early episodes focus on Terry in such assignments, with Arthur remaining in the background. However, as the comedy potential of Cole's dodgy-dealing character emerged, as well as the successful on-screen pairing of Waterman and Cole (which proved to be one of the series' most popular elements), the emphasis increasingly focused more on Arthur's exploits, and by a few series into the show's life, typical plots revolved more around Arthur's latest shady scams instead of some of the more "gritty" plots of Terry's minding jobs.

While the show was broadly entertaining, Griffiths—who was raised in the Communist Party—always saw it in political terms as well. As he told the Daily Mail in 1984, "Terry is a failure–a loser. So is Arthur. That’s part of the charm of the series. They’re little people. Arthur’s a selfish man, with a self-protective skin. He’s a survivor. To me Arthur is the unacceptable face of private enterprise."

Despite its eventual success, Minder was a slow burner, not helped by being delayed by a technicians' strike which forced the ITV network off the air for 75 days from 10 August to 24 October 1979. In the light of initially poor viewing figures, management at Thames were intent on scrapping the show but managing director Bryan Cowgill persuaded them to commission one further series and repeat the first. Both attracted much larger audiences and by series 3, the show had become a major hit, and at its peak was often cited as the "jewel in ITV's Drama crown".

=== Storylines ===
The tone of the programme in series one and two, and much of series three, mixed poignant drama and action sequences with offbeat comic moments, and many of these tales had a grittier feel to them than the more light-hearted storylines that would go on to be more familiar. As the series progressed over 15 years, more emphasis was placed on the comedic aspects of the minder-principal relationship, and the show became more a comedy driven by a dramatic plot. Social satire played a strong part throughout the series, grounded in the cinematic and social ethos of the 1980s. In the earlier series, Terry would succeed in seducing a 'dolly bird', resulting in at least one scene of female semi-nudity per average episode, though as the series became more popular these instances were reduced (and some repeat screenings, even those post-watershed, toned such scenes down). Although always an element of the series, the fights - common and brutal in early episodes - were also toned down and became less frequent.

Another significant element of the series were the subplots typically found in a Minder episode. Although subplots were not found in all of the episodes, they were found in most and usually consisted of one of Arthur's dodgy deals, Terry's minding jobs and/or favours done for friends and in a few instances involved the police tackling particular cases.

The series has a number of parallels with long-running BBC comedy Only Fools and Horses, with both being set in London and involving lovable dodgy dealers with endless get-rich-quick schemes that invariably backfire and get them into trouble (and both of whom tried to make out to be of a higher status than they really were), and both having a blend of comedy and drama. Indeed, Only Fools and Horses creator / writer John Sullivan claimed that one of the ways he persuaded the BBC to commission the series was by pointing to the success of ITV's Minder, which had begun two years previously. After both having lukewarm starts, both series went on to become huge hits, and share much of the same fan base. At Christmas 1985, specials of Only Fools and Horses and Minder were scheduled against each other, angering many viewers in the days before video recorders were commonplace in UK homes.

When the series was first broadcast, some viewers complained about the use of swearing and foul language in the episodes. Even though this gave the storylines a sense of gritty reality, it was noticed that as the series progressed from season to season, the amount of swearing steadily decreased up to the point that when the special episode TV feature film "Minder on the Orient Express" was broadcast, there was practically none at all.

=== Recurring features ===
As well as heavy use of leading British actors, other features were Arthur's constant rhyming slang and other misquoted sayings (one being "the world is your lobster" and "I had a dream"), the derelict sites used as locations, and the episode titles, which contained references to films (e.g. "Gunfight at the O.K. Launderette", "Monday Night Fever", "National Pelmet", "The Beer Hunter", "Days of Fines and Closures", "The Wrong Goodbye" and "Guess Who's Coming to Pinner?").

=== Opening and closing credits ===
The show's opening credit sequence shows the Arthur Daley and Terry McCann characters negotiating over the sale of the white Ford Capri interspersed with still photos of the two main characters, highlighting Terry's credentials as a retired boxer and ex-convict, this presumably symbolising the characters' first meeting and the terms of their partnership. During the Dennis Waterman era, the closing credits consisted of a number of black and white (with blue tint) still photographs of Arthur and Terry together outside famous London landmarks, and a few hinting of (unseen) previous escapades typical of a standard episode plot. In the later Gary Webster series, this changed to Arthur and Ray walking along Southend Pier, which is over a mile long: at the end Arthur realises he has left his lighter at the other end of the pier and they start to walk back to find it.

The 2009 revival features a very different opening sequence, with a reworked theme tune. Archie Daley is shown putting on his suit and opening a suitcase of money, while Jamie is out driving his Hackney cab.

=== Theme tune ===
The theme tune, "I Could Be So Good for You", written in 1979 by Gerard Kenny and Patricia Waterman, was sung by Dennis Waterman. It was released as a single in October 1979, credited to 'Dennis Waterman with the Dennis Waterman Band', but failed to enter the charts. It was then re-released in October 1980, upon which it became more successful, peaking at No.3 in the UK Singles Chart in November. The writing credit of Kenny/Waterman often lead people to mis-credit Dennis as co-writer. Dennis Waterman also sang the theme songs to other programmes he starred in, including On the Up, Stay Lucky, and New Tricks, and this led to a parody in Little Britain where Dennis Waterman played by David Walliams is offered acting work; he always assumes he will also "write the theme tune, sing the theme tune...".

== Episodes ==
Series	Episodes	Originally released	
Series	Episodes	First released	Last released
1	11	29 October 1979	21 January 1980
2	13	11 September 1980	18 December 1980
3	13	13 January 1982	7 April 1982
4	12	26 December 1983	21 March 1984
5	9	5 September 1984	26 December 1984
6	7	4 September 1985	25 December 1985
7	7	26 December 1988	6 February 1989
8	13	5 September 1991	25 December 1991
9	13	7 January 1993	1 April 1993
10	10	6 January 1994	10 March 1994
11	6	4 February 2009	11 March 2009

== Reception ==
At its peak, the show was one of ITV's most popular programmes, even the repeats attracting over 10 million viewers. The highest rated episode was 1984's "Second Hand Pose", with 16.4 million viewers. In 2005, Arthur Daley came second in ITV's 50th anniversary poll to find its favourite TV characters.

The show was said a number of times to have come to an end, only to reappear. For example, in 1984, TV Times reported that series 5 would be the last. In 1985, it again seemed as if the current series was the last, and it was off the air (bar repeats) for three years, to reappear in 1988. This series appeared to be the last as Dennis Waterman announced his departure at the end of its run. However, after a two-and-a-half-year break, the show was back again for a further two-and-a-half-years, which ended with the 10th series in 1994.

== In other media ==
The series inspired a hit single, "Arthur Daley (E's Alright!)" by The Firm, which made the UK Top 20 in 1982. George Cole and Dennis Waterman released a Christmas record in 1983 called "What are We Gonna Get 'Er Indoors?" which reached No. 21 in the charts. The duo performed it on Top of the Pops on 22 December 1983.

In 1980, an annual based on the series was released by Grandreams. It was based upon the early concept of the series being based around Terry, and made no reference to Arthur. Two further annuals were released by World International Publishing for 1985 and 1986. These annuals featured both Terry and Arthur, with illustrations of both Dennis Waterman and George Cole.

A Leon Griffiths authored book - Arthur Daley's Guide To Doing It Right!, which included black & white stills from the series, along with caricatures by John Ireland - was published in 1985 by Willow Books, appearing in paperback in 1986 from Fontana.

In 1985, an officially licensed Minder computer game was published for the ZX Spectrum and Amstrad CPC. The player's aim was to make money by buying and selling goods, interacting with other characters through a rudimentary conversation system. The game was written by Don Priestley and published by DK'Tronics.

In 2021, Paul Stenning released a podcast interviewing people involved with the show. Episodes released include interviews with George Layton, Gerard Kenny, Suzi Quatro, Karl Howman and Gennie Nevinson. The show also includes investigations into how certain Minder episodes were filmed or written. These include episodes based upon real life events such as the murder of a Krays associate in Looking For Micky, or Caught in the Act, Fact which was based upon Isobel Barnett.
