= Meic Povey =

Welsh actor and director (1950–2017)

- Born: Michael Povey; 28 November 1950; Wales
- Died: 5 December 2017 (aged 67)
- Occupations: Actor; Screenwriter; Director
- Notable work: Minder

Michael "Meic" Povey (28 November 1950 – 5 December 2017) was a Welsh screenwriter, director and actor in Welsh and English language roles, considered to be one of Wales's leading playwrights and screenwriters. He was also one of the co-creators of the long running soap opera Pobol y Cwm.

Outside Wales, he was probably best known for portraying DC Jones, DS Chisholm's put-upon detective constable in the popular series Minder. Originally from Nant Gwynant, near Beddgelert in Gwynedd, Povey lived in Cardiff for many years. He died of cancer on 5 December 2017, aged 67.

In October 2021 The Minder Podcast paid tribute to Povey.

== Works ==
=== Plays ===
- Curious Under the Stars (2016)
- Tyner yw'r Lleuad Heno (2009)
- Hen Bobl Mewn Ceir (2006)
- Life of Ryan ... and Ronnie (2005)
- Indian Country (2003)
- Yr Hen Blant (1999)
- Diwedd y Byd (1999)
- Tair (1998)
- Bonanza (1997) (Bonansa)
- Fel Anifail (1995)
- Yn Debyg Iawn i Ti a Fi (1995)

=== As screenwriter ===
- Byw Celwydd (2016-2018)
- Teulu
- Talcen Caled
- Nel
- Sul Y Blodau (Palm Sunday)

=== As actor ===
- Minder - DC 'Taff' Jones (1982-1989)
- Gawain and the Green Knight - The Blacksmith (1991)
- Un Nos Ola' Leuad - Preis (1991)
- The Jazz Detective - DS Priest (1992)
- Pobol y Cwm - Eddie Lewis (1991-1994, 1996)
- A Mind to Kill - Jack Bevan (1994-1997)
- Y Mabinogi - voice (2003)
- Doctor Who - Coachman, episode "The Unquiet Dead" (2005)
