= Minder on the Orient Express =

- Genre: Adventure; Comedy; Crime; Drama
- Written by: Andrew Payne
- Directed by: Francis Megahy
- Starring: Dennis Waterman; George Cole
- Theme music composer: Denis King
- Country of origin: United Kingdom
- Original language: English

Production
- Executive producer: Lloyd Shirley
- Producer: George Taylor
- Cinematography: Dusty Miller
- Editor: Roger Wilson
- Running time: 106 mins
- Production company: Euston Films

Original release
- Release: 25 December 1985

Related
- Minder

Minder on the Orient Express is a 1985 comedy/thriller television film as a spin-off from the successful television series Minder. It was first broadcast on Christmas Day 1985, as the highlight of that year's ITV Christmas schedule. This Christmas special was written by Andrew Payne.

== Plot ==
When Nikki South (Amanda Pays) inherits the contents of a bank strongbox left by her father, former gangland boss Jack South, shortly before his death in 1975, she realises that the contents form a clue to the number of a Swiss bank account used to stash her father's ill-gotten gains.

Nikki is waylaid on her way to her birthday party. The masked attackers try to wrestle the clues, kept in an envelope, from her, but she is rescued by Terry McCann (Dennis Waterman), who is working as a temporary doorman at the club where the party is to be held. She later thanks him by presenting him with two return tickets for the Orient Express to Venice. Terry, not realizing Nikki has an ulterior motive for inviting him, plans to take Annie, his current girlfriend who also works at the club, with him.

Nikki plans to travel to Switzerland with her boyfriend Mark (James Coombes) on the same train to claim the contents. But others have their eyes on the potential windfall, especially several former associates of her father. They include a bent bank manager (Maurice Denham), a hitman (Adam Faith) and the widow of a former associate (Honor Blackman).

Arthur Daley (George Cole) is on the run. He's been a reluctant witness to a protection racket attack and Detective Sergeant Rycott (Peter Childs) is trying to serve a subpoena on him to testify in court against violent gangster, Brian "Brain Damage" Gammidge. Arthur persuades Terry's girlfriend that Terry's (non-existent) wife and children have arrived unexpectedly, and when she angrily dumps him, Arthur turns up at the railway station and brazenly persuades a furious Terry to take him along, thus evading the subpoena.

As they travel towards Folkestone, Nikki enlists Terry's help again, as the former associates try to get the envelope off her. They also discover that Arthur's other nemesis, Detective Sergeant Chisholm (Patrick Malahide), is also travelling on the train, having been seconded to Interpol alongside Interpol agent Sergeant Francois LeBlanc (Ralph Bates) to observe the various 'faces'.

As the train travels through night-time France, matters eventually come to a head and a free-for-all scrap ensues. Even Chisholm joins in the fight, upholding the honour of the police in the face of an easy-going and slightly drunk French detective. As the train comes to a halt following the pulling of the emergency cord, Arthur, Terry and Nikki get off the train, to be joined by Chisholm.

Nikki and Terry complete the cracking of the code to the bank account number (players' shirt numbers from the 1971 Arsenal F.C. FA Cup match), but following a fight with two of the villains on a local French train, the partial Swiss Bank account number is lost. So there's no pot of gold for anyone and the protagonists return to Fulham Broadway.

== Supporting cast ==
Both George Cole and Johnny Goodman (Executive in Charge of Production) have stated that this is 'probably' their favourite episode of the whole series, and certainly the most fun to make as it had such a diverse supporting cast. Joining the regular cast of Dennis Waterman, George Cole, Glynn Edwards, Patrick Malahide and Peter Childs were a number of high-profile supporting actors. These included:

- Hammer Horror, Poldark and Dear John star Ralph Bates as Interpol detective Francois LeBlanc
- Canadian film actor Robert Beatty as The Judge, an American tourist who consistently mistakes Arthur for a waiter
- Honor Blackman as the widow of one of Jack South's henchmen
- Adam Faith as hitman James Crane
- Ronald Lacey as Harry Ridler, who used to 'sit on' Jack South's robbery proceeds until "the dust settled"
- Linda Hayden as Terry's girlfriend, Annie
- Maurice Denham as Meredith Gascoigne, another of Jack South's cronies
- James Faulkner as gangster Ted Moore, another South associate
- Amanda Pays as Nikki South, Jack South's daughter and sole heiress to his fortune.
- Actress Alexandra Avery plays young Nikki South.
- James Coombes as the son of one of South's henchmen
- Tony Hawks is an uncredited supporting artist.
- Garfield Morgan as Superintendent Mason. Both Morgan and Waterman also appeared in The Sweeney as DCI Frank Haskins and DS George Carter respectively
- Jonathan Kydd as Van Driver
