= Lists of home video releases =

This is list of lists of home video releases.

== List ==
- List of Bratz home video releases
- List of Buffy the Vampire Slayer home video releases
- List of Da Ali G Show home video releases
- List of Danger Mouse home video releases
- List of Degrassi home video releases
- List of Doctor Who home video releases
- List of Dora the Explorer home media releases
- List of Family Guy home video releases
- List of Garfield home video releases
- List of Hannah Montana home video releases
- List of Heartbeat home media releases
- List of Hi-5 home video releases
- List of King of the Hill home video releases
- List of Mighty Morphin Power Rangers home video releases
- List of Murder, She Wrote home video releases
- List of My Little Pony home video releases
- List of My Little Pony: Friendship Is Magic home video releases
- List of Mystery Science Theater 3000 home video releases
- List of NCIS home video releases
- List of NCIS: Los Angeles home video releases
- List of other Doctor Who home video releases
- List of Prisoner home video releases
- List of South Park home video releases
- List of SpongeBob SquarePants home video releases
- List of Star Trek: Deep Space Nine home video releases
- List of Teenage Mutant Ninja Turtles (2003 TV series) home video releases
- List of That '70s Show home video releases
- List of The Bill home video releases
- List of The Simpsons home video releases
- List of Top Gear home video releases
- List of Twin Peaks home video releases
