= Big Deal (TV series) =

- Genre: Comedy drama
- Created by: Geoff McQueen
- Written by: David Crane
- Starring: Ray Brooks; Sharon Duce; Pamela Cundell; James Ottaway; Lisa Geoghan
- Theme music composer: Bobby G
- Opening theme: "Big Deal"
- Country of origin: United Kingdom
- Original language: English
- No. of series: 3
- No. of episodes: 30

Production
- Producer: Terry Williams
- Running time: 50 minutes

Original release
- Network: BBC1
- Release: 14 October 1984 – 4 November 1986

Big Deal is a British comedy-drama television series originally broadcast by the BBC between 14 October 1984 and 4 November 1986. The series was created and written by Geoff McQueen, who created several other major television series including Give Us a Break, Stay Lucky, and The Bill.

Starring Ray Brooks, Sharon Duce and Lisa Geoghan, the series concentrated on the ups and downs of small-time London gambler Robby Box (played by Brooks) and the effect that his poker addiction has on his long suffering girlfriend Jan Oliver (Duce) and her daughter Debby (Geoghan).

The theme music was by Bucks Fizz member Bobby G.

== Cast ==
- Ray Brooks – Robby Box
- Sharon Duce – Jan Oliver
- Lisa Geoghan – Debby Oliver
- Pamela Cundell – Vi Box
- James Ottaway – Tommy
- Andy Mulligan – Geordie
- Kenneth Waller – Ferret
- Deirdre Costello – Joan
- Stephen Tate – Dick Mayer
- Frank Mills – Gil Roach
- Alex Tetteh-Lartey – Black George
- Roger Walker – Kipper
- Tony Caunter – Henry Diamond

== Series overview ==
Series	Episodes	Originally released	
Series	Episodes	First released	Last released
1	10	14 October 1984	30 December 1984
2	10	3 September 1985	5 November 1985
3	10	2 September 1986	4 November 1986

== Episodes ==
=== Series 1 (1984) ===
No.	Title	Directed by	Written by	Original release date
1	"Red Lady, Black Night"	Brian Lighthill	Geoff McQueen	14 October 1984
2	"One Good Turnover"	John Glenister	Geoff McQueen	21 October 1984
3	"A Ragged Run"	Carol Wiseman	Geoff McQueen	28 October 1984
4	"Some You Win..."	Christopher Menaul	Gawn Grainger	4 November 1984
5	"The Luck of the Irish"	John Glenister	Gawn Grainger	11 November 1984
6	"Fighting Chance"	Carol Wiseman	Anthony Couch	18 November 1984
7	"Video Man"	Chris Menaul	Gawn Grainger	2 December 1984
8	"Cash Flow"	Gerald Blake	Max Marquis	9 December 1984
9	"Nine Bob Notes"	Carol Wiseman	Gawn Grainger	23 December 1984
10	"Home An' Dry"	David Reynolds	Geoff McQueen	30 December 1984

=== Series 2 (1985) ===
No.	Title	Directed by	Written by	Original release date
11	"Down and Under"	Jeremy Summers	Geoff McQueen	3 September 1985
12	"Getting Knotted"	Jeremy Summers	Gawn Grainger	10 September 1985
13	"What Are Friends For?"	John Glenister	Anthony Couch	17 September 1985
14	"Popping Across the Pond"	Carol Wiseman	Gawn Grainger	24 September 1985
15	"Breakthrough"	Derek Lister	Anthony Couch	1 October 1985
16	"Guv'nor"	Jeremy Summers	Anthony Couch	8 October 1985
17	"Partners"	Derek Lister	Max Marquis	15 October 1985
18	"The Rabbit and the Hare"	Carol Wiseman	Gawn Grainger	22 October 1985
19	"Windfall"	Jeremy Summers	Neil Rudyard	29 October 1985
20	"I Gotta Horse"	Carol Wiseman	Gawn Grainger	5 November 1985

=== Series 3 (1986) ===
No.	Title	Directed by	Written by	Original release date
21	"The Big Sleep"	Jeremy Summers	Geoff McQueen	2 September 1986
22	"The Z Team"	Jeremy Summers	Anthony Couch	9 September 1986
23	"Deals on Wheels"	Jan Sargent	Gawn Grainger	16 September 1986
24	"Tuppence Coloured"	Laurence Moody	Anthony Couch	23 September 1986
25	"The Chicken and the Egg"	Jeremy Summers	Gawn Grainger	30 September 1986
26	"Panel Money"	Jan Sargent	Geoff McQueen	7 October 1986
27	"Following in Father's Footsteps"	Laurence Moody	Gawn Grainger	14 October 1986
28	"Playing the Ace"	Jeremy Summers	Anthony Couch	21 October 1986
29	"The Biggest Deal"	Laurence Moody	Geoff McQueen	28 October 1986
30	"Innocent, OK?"	Jeremy Summers	Gawn Grainger	4 November 1986

== DVD releases ==
Series 1 of Big Deal was released on DVD by the BBC on 24 July 2006.
