= Lisa Geoghan =

English actress (born 1966)

- Born: Lisa Maria Geoghan; 1 June 1966 (age 60); Southwark, London, England
- Occupation: Actress
- Years active: 1980–2004, 2015–present
- Spouse: Michael Power (1996–present)
- Children: 2

Lisa Maria Geoghan (/ˈɡeɪɡən/ [rhymes with pagan]; born 1 June 1966 in Southwark, London) is an English actress best known for playing PC Polly Page from 1992 to 2004 in the long-running police drama The Bill.

== Career ==
Geoghan trained at the Anna Scher Theatre School from the age of 12, and acted at the Old Vic Youth Theatre between 1978 and 1980. Her first TV appearance was a small role in Trevor Preston's drama Fox in 1980. She has been well known in the UK since appearing at 16, as Sarah Gill, in Tucker's Luck. Other leading roles were all three series of The Bill creator's Geoff McQueen's gambling drama Big Deal (with Ray Brooks), and 20 episodes of Desmond's between 1989 and 1992.

=== The Bill ===
Following a guest appearance in the episode "Breakout" in late 1991, Geoghan became a cast regular as WPC Polly Page in The Bill from 1992 to 2004, a role she played for 12 years. As Page, she made 601 episodes of the series. Long-running storylines included a relationship with colleague Dave Quinnan (Andrew Paul) and, after she joined the Community Safety Unit, a murder plot involving PC Cathy Bradford. Geoghan took a year off from the police drama after her son was born and, after returning for a while, she decided to leave permanently to concentrate on her role as a mother.

=== Later ===
Geoghan guest-starred in Casualty in 2015, in her first return to acting in ten years.

In 2019 she appeared on stage at the Theatre Peckham's 30th anniversary celebration of Desmond's first ever episode.

Also in 2019, Geoghan shared her memories of her career in a two-part interview for The Bill Podcast.

In December 2021 Geoghan made a guest appearance in EastEnders playing Paula, a barmaid in the pub owned by Linda Carter's (Kellie Bright) mother Elaine Peacock (Maria Friedman).

== Personal life ==
Geoghan grew up on a council estate in Bermondsey, first meeting her future husband when she was 14. They met again when she was 20, and have been together since. The couple have two children, Oliver and Harry.
