= I Woke Up One Morning =

Television series

- Genre: Sitcom
- Written by: Carla Lane
- Starring: Michael Angelis; Peter Caffrey; Frederick Jaeger
- Country of origin: United Kingdom
- Original language: English
- No. of series: 2
- No. of episodes: 12

Production
- Producer: Robin Nash
- Running time: 30 minutes
- Production company: BBC

Original release
- Network: BBC 1
- Release: 21 March 1985 – 17 April 1986

I Woke Up One Morning is a British television sitcom which aired on BBC One in two series from 1985 to 1986.

== Main cast ==
- Michael Angelis as Max
- Peter Caffrey as Danny
- Robert Gillespie as Zero
- Frederick Jaeger as Derek
- Jonathan Kydd as Eddie
- Tim Potter as Irrelevant
- Jennifer Daniel as Isobel
- Shirin Taylor as Rosa
- Jean Boht as Mrs. Hamilton
- Marcia Warren as Doris
- Frances White as Sister May
- Barrie Gosney as Colin
- David Shaw Parker as Joey

== Bibliography ==
- Horace Newcomb. Encyclopedia of Television. Routledge, 2014.
