= List of The Bill home video releases =

The following is a complete list of home media releases related to the British ITV of the police drama series The Bill which aired from 16 August 1983 to its cancellation on 31 August 2010.

== DVDs ==
=== United Kingdom ===
DVD title	Number of episodes	Years of series	Release date	Notes
The Trial of Eddie Santini	3	1999–2000	7 October 2002	Includes a condensed version of the episodes "Lone Ranger", "Old Flame", "Push It" and "Kiss Off", entitled "Kiss Off: Parts 1 & 2", plus "The Trial of Eddie Santini". This DVD set contains 1 disc.
The Complete First Series	12	1983 & 1984–1985	6 June 2005	Includes episodes 1–12 of series one; also includes the pilot episode of the series, "Woodentop". This DVD set contains 4 discs.
The Complete Second Series	12	1985–1986	26 October 2005	Includes episodes 1–12 of series two. This DVD set contains 3 discs.
Promotional Taster	2	1983 & 1986	16 April 2007	Includes the pilot episode of the series, "Woodentop", and the last episode of the second series, "The Chief Super's Party". This DVD set contains 1 disc.
The Complete Third Series	12	1987	28 May 2007	Includes episodes 1–12 of series three. This DVD set contains 3 discs.
The Complete Series 1 – 3	36	1984–1987	19 November 2007	Also includes the pilot episode of the series, "Woodentop". This DVD set contains 10 discs.
The Bill: Volume 1	13	1988	30 June 2008	Includes episodes 1–13 of series four. This DVD set contains 2 discs.
The Bill: Volume 2	13	1988	2 March 2009	Includes episodes 14-26 of series four. This DVD set contains 2 discs.
The Bill: Volume 3	13	1988	11 May 2009	Includes episodes 27-39 of series four. This DVD set contains 2 discs.
The Bill: Volume 4	13	1988–1989	15 March 2010	Includes episodes 40-48 of series four, and episodes 1–4 of series five. This DVD set contains 2 discs.
The Bill: Volume 5	13	1989	11 July 2011	Includes episodes 5-17 of series five. This DVD set contains 2 discs.
Soap Box: Volume 1	1	2003	31 October 2011	Included as part of the Soap Box compilation, featuring episodes of various British soaps and TV dramas. Includes live episode, Series 19 – Episode #87 from 2003.
The Bill: Volume 6	48	1989	15 October 2012	Includes episodes 18-65 of series five. This DVD set contains 6 discs.
The Bill: Volume 7	48	1989–1990	2 September 2013	Includes episodes 66–104 of series five and episodes 1–9 of series six. This DVD set contains 6 discs.
The Bill: Volume 8	48	1990	5 October 2015	Includes episodes 10 – 57 of series six. This DVD set contains 6 discs. The final ever volume of The Bill from Network; in 2019, Network decided not to release any more of The Bill on DVD in the UK.
ITV 60	1	1993	26 October 2015	Included as part of the ITV 60 compilation, featuring episodes of various British soaps and TV dramas. Includes Series 9 – Episode #36 ("The Short Straw") from 1993.

=== Australia ===
Via Vision Entertainment acquired the rights to the series and started releasing the series from September 2020 to November 2020. Series 1–4 on 16 September 2020, Series 5 and 6 on 21 October 2020, Series 7 and 8 on 18 November 2020.

DVD release name	Episodes	Discs	Years of series	Release date	Notes
Season 1 – 3	1–36	12	1984–1987	10 May 2006	Includes all thirty-six episodes from the first three series, including the pilot episode, "Woodentop". Box set is in Region 4.
Season 4 & 5	1–48	12	1988	4 December 2006	Although stated on the box art, the set contains all forty-eight episodes from series four only, and does not contain any episodes from series five. Box set is in Region 4.
Collection 3	49–96	12	1989	8 August 2007	Contains the first forty-eight episodes of series five. Box set is in Region 4.
Collection 4	97–144	12	1989	7 November 2007	Contains episodes 49 – 96 of series five. Box set is in Region 4.
Collection 5	145–192	12	1989–1990	9 April 2008	Contains episodes 97-104 of series five, and the first forty episodes of series six. Box set is in Region 4.
Collection 6	193–240	12	1990	8 October 2008	Contains episodes 41 – 88 of series six. Last box set in the series after the distributor, Magna Pacific, went into liquidation. Not many copies of this collection were printed. Box set is in Region 4.
Series 1	1–12	4	1984–1985	3 August 2011	The complete first series. Also contains the pilot episode of the series, "Woodentop". DVD set is in Region 0.
Series 2	1–12	3	1985–1986	3 August 2011	The complete second series. DVD set is in Region 0.
Series 3	1–12	3	1987	3 August 2011	The complete third series. DVD set is in Region 0.
Series 4	1–48	7	1988	31 August 2011	The complete fourth series. Series 4 has two different covers, the slim amaray case has Ted Roach and the fat pack has Bob Cryer and Jim Carver. Both DVD sets is in Region 0.
Farewell: The Bill	30–31	1	2010	5 October 2011	Includes the last ever episodes, "Respect: Part 1" and "Respect: Part 2", plus the behind-the-scenes documentary, Farewell: The Bill. DVD is in Region 0.
Series 1 – 4	1–84	17	1984–1988	1 February 2012	Also includes the pilot episode of the series, "Woodentop". DVD Box set is in Region 0.
Series 5: Part 1	1–52	8	1989	7 March 2012	Includes the first fifty-two episodes of series five. DVD set in Region 0.
Series 5: Part 2	53–104	8	1989	7 March 2012	Includes the last fifty-two episodes of series five. DVD set is in Region 0.
Series 6: Part 1	1–52	8	1990	7 March 2012	Includes the first fifty-two episodes of series six. DVD set is in Region 0.
Series 6: Part 2	53–104	8	1990	7 March 2012	Includes the last fifty-two episodes of series six. DVD set is in Region 0.
Series 7: Part 1	1–53	8	1991	6 June 2012	Includes the first fifty-three episodes of series seven. DVD set is in Region 0.
Series 7: Part 2	54–105	8	1991	6 June 2012	Includes the last fifty-two episodes of series seven. DVD set in Region 0.
Series 8: Part 1	1–52	8	1992	6 June 2012	Includes the first fifty-two episodes of series eight. DVD set in Region 0.
Series 8: Part 2	53–105	8	1992	6 June 2012	Includes the last fifty-three episodes of series eight. DVD set in Region 0.
Series 9: Part 1 & 2	1–77	12	1993	3 October 2012	Includes the first seventy-seven episodes of series nine. DVD set in Region 0.
Series 9: Part 3 & 4	78–155	12	1993	3 October 2012	Includes the last seventy-eight episodes of series nine. DVD set in Region 0.
Series 10: Part 1 & 2	1–78	12	1994	3 October 2012	Includes the first seventy-eight episodes of series ten. DVD set in Region 0.
Series 10: Part 3 & 4	79–156	12	1994	3 October 2012	Includes the last seventy-eight episodes of series ten. DVD set in Region 0.
Series 11: Part 1 & 2	1–74	11	1995	6 February 2013	Includes the first seventy-four episodes of series eleven. DVD set in Region 0.
Series 11: Part 3 & 4	75–149	11	1995	6 February 2013	Includes the last seventy-five episodes of series eleven. DVD set in Region 0.
Series 12: Part 1 & 2	1–77	12	1996	6 February 2013	Includes the first seventy-seven episodes of series twelve. DVD set in Region 0.
Series 12: Part 3 & 4	78-156	12	1996	6 February 2013	Includes the last seventy-nine episodes of series twelve. DVD set in Region 0.
Series 13: Part 1 & 2	1–76	12	1997	3 April 2013	Includes the first seventy-six episodes of series thirteen. DVD set in Region 0.
Series 13: Part 3 & 4	77-152	12	1997	3 April 2013	Includes the last seventy-six episodes of series thirteen. DVD set in Region 0.
Series 14: Part 1 & 2	1–60	10	1998	3 April 2013	Includes the first sixty episodes of series fourteen. DVD set in Region 0.
Series 14: Part 3 – 5	61–121	13	1998	3 April 2013	Includes the last sixty-one episodes of series fourteen. DVD set in Region 0.
THE 80s COLLECTION	1–188	33	1984–1989	3 April 2013	Contains Series 1–5 (all episodes from the 1980s); also includes the pilot episode of the series, "Woodentop". DVD Box set is in Region 0.
Series 15: Part 1 & 2	1–43	11	1999	5 June 2013	Includes the first forty-three episodes of series fifteen. DVD set in Region 0.
Series 15: Part 3 & 4	44-87	12	1999	5 June 2013	Includes the last forty-four episodes of series fifteen. DVD set in Region 0.
Series 16: Part 1 & 2	1–43	12	2000	5 June 2013	Includes the first forty-three episodes of series sixteen. DVD set in Region 0.
Series 16: Part 3 & 4	44-86	11	2000	5 June 2013	Includes forty-three episodes of series sixteen. Does not include episode 67 in Safe Hands due to licensing rights not being available. DVD set in Region 0.
Series 17: Part 1 & 2	1–46	11	2001	14 August 2013	Includes the first forty-six episodes of series seventeen. DVD set in Region 0.
Series 17: Part 3 & 4	47–92	12	2001	14 August 2013	Includes the last forty-six episodes of series seventeen. DVD set in Region 0.
Series 18: Part 1 & 2	1–43	11	2002	14 August 2013	Includes the first forty-three episodes of series eighteen. DVD set in Region 0.
Series 18: Part 3 & 4	44–86	11	2002	14 August 2013	Includes the last forty-three episodes of series eighteen. DVD set in Region 0.
Beech Is Back	—	2	2001	4 September 2013	Contains the storyline "Beech on the Run" / "Beech Is Back", Series 17 Episodes 60–66. The DVD is set in Region 4. This is the only release from Shock that is in Region 4.
Series 19: Part 1 – 3	1–53	13	2003	16 October 2013	Includes the first fifty-three episodes of series nineteen. DVD set in Region 0.
Series 19: Part 4 – 6	53–106	13	2003	16 October 2013	Includes the last fifty-three episodes of series nineteen. DVD set in Region 0.
Series 20: Part 1 – 3	1–48	13	2004	16 October 2013	Includes the first forty-eight episodes of series twenty. DVD set in Region 0.
Series 20: Part 4 – 6	49–96	13	2004	16 October 2013	Includes the last forty-seven episodes of series twenty. DVD set in Region 0.
Series 21: Part 1 – 3	1–53	15	2005	5 February 2014	Includes the first fifty-three episodes of series twenty one. DVD set in Region 0.
Series 21: Part 4 – 6	54–106	15	2005	5 February 2014	Includes the last fifty-three episodes of series twenty-one. DVD set in Region 0.
Series 22: Part 1 – 3	1–47	12	2006	5 February 2014	Includes the first forty-seven episodes of series twenty-two. DVD set in Region 0.
Series 22: Part 4 – 6	48–94	12	2006	5 February 2014	Includes the last forty seven episodes of series twenty-two. DVD set in Region 0.
Series 23: Part 1 & 2	1–45	12	2007	2 April 2014	Includes the first forty five episodes of series twenty-three. DVD set in Region 0.
Series 23: Part 3 & 4	46–81 & 85–92	12	2007	2 April 2014	Includes forty four of the last forty seven episodes of series twenty-three. DVD set in Region 0. The three part storyline "Moving Target" is not included on this set.
Series 24: Part 1 & 2	1–44	11	2008	2 April 2014	Includes the first forty four episodes of series twenty-four. DVD set in Region 0.
Series 24: Part 3 & 4	45–88	11	2008	2 April 2014	Includes the last forty four episodes of series twenty-four. DVD set in Region 0.
Series 25: Part 1 – 3	1–65	17	2009	30 April 2014	Includes all sixty five episodes of series twenty-five. DVD set in Region 0.
Series 26: Part 1 & 2	1–31	10	2010	30 April 2014	Includes all thirty one episodes of series twenty-six, The Bill: Uncovered' Four Part Documentary and Farewell The Bill. DVD set in Region 0.
The 90's Collection	—	20	1992–1999	1 October 2014	Selected episodes from 1992 to 1999, "FIREPROOF", "THE PADDY FACTOR", "THE WILD ROVER", "COINCIDENCE", "GOING SOFT" are some of the selected episodes in this 20 disc set. DVD set in Region 4.
Christmas Collection	1–5	2	1997–2008	1 October 2014	Includes all five Christmas episodes, Twanky (1997), Christmas Star (1998), When the Snow Lay Round About (1999), The Night Before (2000) and Santa's Little Helper (2008). DVD set in Region 4.
Series 1–4	1–84	17	1984–1988	16 September 2020	Also includes the pilot episode of the series, "Woodentop". DVD Box set is in Region 0.
Series 5	1–104	16	1989	21 October 2020	All one hundred and four episodes of series five. DVD set is in Region 0.
Series 6	1–104	16	1990	21 October 2020	All one hundred and four episodes of series six. DVD set is in Region 0.
Series 7	1–105	16	1991	18 November 2020	All one hundred and five episodes of series seven. DVD set is in Region 0.
Series 8	1–105	16	1992	18 November 2020	All one hundred and five episodes of series eight. DVD set is in Region 0.
Series 9	1–155	24	1993	16 December 2020	All one hundred and fifty-five episodes of series nine. DVD Set is in Region 0.
Series 10	1–156	24	1994	16 December 2020	All one hundred and fifty-six episodes of series ten. DVD Set is in Region 0.
Series 11	1–149	22	1995	6 January 2021	All one hundred and forty-nine episodes of series eleven. DVD Set is in Region 0.
Series 12	1–156	24	1996	17 February 2021	All one hundred and fifty-six episodes of series twelve.
Series 13	1–152	24	1997	17 March 2021	All one hundred and fifty-two episodes of series thirteen.
Series 14	1–121	23	1998	21 April 2021	All one hundred and twenty-one episodes of series fourteen.
Series 15	1–87	23	1999	19 May 2021	All eighty-seven episodes of series fifteen.
Series 16	1–84	23	2000	16 June 2021	All eighty-four episodes of series sixteen. Also includes the previously unreleased-to-DVD episode "In Safe Hands".

=== United States ===
DVD title	Episodes	Years of series	Release date	Notes
The Complete First Series	1–12	1984–1985	5 June 2007	Includes all twelve episodes from the first series, including the pilot episode, "Woodentop". Also included as special features are Behind the creation of The Bill, The London Beat featurette, and photo galleries. This DVD is locked to Region 1.

== VHS ==
=== United Kingdom ===
Title	Release date	Notes
The Bill – Volume 1	5 June 1989	Includes the series two episodes "Snouts and Red Herrings" (Episode 1) and Suspects (Episode 2).
The Bill – Volume 2	6 August 1990	Includes the series five episodes "Don't Like Mondays" (Episode 59) and "Pick Up" (Episode 60), and the series six episodes "Trojan Horse" (Episode 41) and "Rites" (Episode 42).
Woodentop	11 October 1993	Includes the pilot episode of the series, "Woodentop".
The Originals – Volume 1	23 October 1995	Includes the pilot episode of the series, "Woodentop", and the series one episode, "Funny Ol' Business" (Episode 2).
The Originals – Volume 2	23 October 1995	Includes the series one episodes "A Friend in Need" (Episode 3) and "Clutching at Straws" (Episode 4).
The Originals – Volume 3	6 November 1995	Includes the series one episodes "Long Odds" (Episode 5) and "A Dangerous Breed" (Episode 8).
Target	11 March 1996	Includes the series twelve episode "Target" (Episode 89), which, in turn, is a condensed version of the series eleven episodes "Fire" (Episode 114), "All Tucked Up" (Episode 115) and "Bait" (Episode 116). Also includes the series eleven episode "Damage Limitation" (Episode 117).
Two Extended Editions	23 June 1997	Includes the series twelve episodes "Spill" (Episode 74) and "Death of a Nobody" (Episode 138).
The Burnside Files	14 July 1997	Includes the series six episodes "A Clean Division" (Episode 7), "Burnside Knew My Father" (Episode 21) and "Scores" (Episode 50), and the series nine episode "If It Isn't Hurting" (Episode 27).
The Roach Files	11 August 1997	Includes the series five episode "Don't Like Mondays" (Episode 59), the series six episodes "Information Received" (Episode 31) and "Friends and Neighbours" (Episode 104), and the series nine episode "Punch Drunk" (Episode 57).
The Trial of Eddie Santini (Also Released on DVD)	9 October 2000	Includes the series 16 episodes, "Kiss Off: Part One" (Episode 21), "Kiss Off: Part Two" (Episode 22) and "The Trial of Eddie Santini" (Episode 23).

=== Australia ===
Title	Release date	Notes
The Bill: The Burnside Specials – Volume 1	11 May 1996	Includes the series six episodes "Burnside Knew My Father" (Episode 21) and "Information Received" (Episode 31), and the series eight episode "Dinosaur" (Episode 7).
The Bill: The Burnside Specials – Volume 2	3 December 1996	Includes the series six episodes "A Clean Division" (Episode 7) and "Scores" (Episode 50), and the series nine episode "If It Isn't Hurting" (Episode 27).
The Bill: When Opportunity Knocks	15 September 2000	Includes the series ten episode "Beg, Borrow or Steal" (Episode 139), and the series eleven episodes "Street Life" (Episode 17) and "When Opportunity Knocks" (Episode 47).
The Bill: Waiting For Frank	19 November 2000	Includes the series twelve episode "Waiting for Frank" (Episode 103), and the series fourteen episode "Cast No Shadow" (Episode 99).
The Bill: A Bunch of Fives	15 January 2001	Includes the series twelve episode "Death of a Nobody" (Episode 138), and the series thirteen episode "A Bunch of Fives" (Episode 61).
The Bill: Gentleman Jim	9 March 2001	Includes the series eleven episode "Saved" (Episode 126) and the series thirteen episodes "True to Life Player" (Episode 17) and "Gentleman Jim" (Episode 83).
The Bill: In on the Game	17 August 2001	Includes the series twelve episode "Spill" (Episode 74) and the series eleven episode "In on the Game" (Episode 40).

== Online ==
=== iTunes ===
On 23 November 2011, Shock Entertainment started making some of its The Bill DVD release available to purchase through iTunes (Australia Store only); all releases are below.

Title	Episodes	Years of series	Notes
Series 1	1–12	1984–1985	Included episodes 2–12 from the first series; excludes the pilot episode, "Woodentop".
Series 2	1–12	1985–1986	Includes the complete second series.
Series 3	1–12	1987	Includes the complete third series.
Series 4	1–48	1988	Includes the complete fourth series.
Series 5: Part 1	1–52	1989	Includes the first fifty-two episodes of series five.
Series 5: Part 2	53–104	1989	Includes the last fifty-two episodes of series five.
Series 6: Part 1	1–52	1990	Includes the first fifty-two episodes of series six.
Series 6: Part 2	53–104	1990	Includes the last fifty-two episodes of series six.
Series 7: Part 1	1–53	1991	Includes the first fifty-three episodes of series seven.
Series 7: Part 2	45–105	1991	Includes the last fifty-two episodes of series seven.
Series 8: Part 1	1–52	1992	Includes the first fifty-two episodes of series eight.
Series 8: Part 2	53–105	1992	Includes the last fifty-three episodes of series eight.
Series 9: Part 1	1–36	1993	Includes the first thirty-six episodes of series nine.
Series 9: Part 2	37–77	1993	Includes the next forty-one episodes of series nine.
Series 9: Part 3	78–114	1993	Includes the next thirty-seven episodes of series nine.
Series 9: Part 4	114–155	1993	Includes the last forty-one episodes of series nine.
Series 10: Part 1	1–37	1994	Includes the first thirty-seven episodes of series ten.
Series 10: Part 2	38–77	1994	Includes the next forty episodes of series ten.
Series 10: Part 3	78–114	1994	Includes the next thirty-seven episodes of series ten.
Series 10: Part 4	78–156	1994	Includes the last forty-two episodes of series ten.
Series 11: Part 1	1–33	1995	Includes the first thirty-three episodes of series eleven.
Series 11: Part 2	34–74	1995	Includes the next episodes forty-one of series eleven.
Series 11: Part 3	75–108	1995	Includes the next episodes thirty-four of series eleven.
Series 11: Part 4	109–149	1995	Includes the last episodes forty-one of series eleven.
Series 12: Part 1	1–37	1996	Includes the first thirty-seven episodes of series twelve.
Series 12: Part 2	38–77	1996	Includes the next forty episodes of series twelve.
Series 12: Part 3	78–114	1996	Includes the next thirty-seven episodes of series twelve.
Series 12: Part 4	114–156	1996	Includes the last forty-two episodes of series twelve.
Series 13: Part 1	1–38	1997	Includes the first thirty-eight episodes of series thirteen.
Series 13: Part 2	39–79	1997	Includes the next forty-one episodes of series thirteen.
Series 13: Part 3	80–114	1997	Includes the next thirty-five episodes of series thirteen.
Series 13: Part 4	115–152	1997	Includes the last thirty-eight episodes of series thirteen.
Series 14: Part 1	1–30	1998	Includes the first thirty episodes of series fourteen.
Series 14: Part 2	31–60	1998	Includes the next thirty episodes of series fourteen.
Series 14: Part 3	61–93	1998	Includes the next thirty-three episodes of series fourteen.
Series 14: Part 4	94–109	1998	Includes the next sixteen episodes of series fourteen.
Series 14: Part 5	110–121	1998	Includes the next twelve episodes of series fourteen.
Series 15: Part 1	1–24	1999	Includes the first twenty-four episodes of series fifteen.
Series 15: Part 2	25–43	1999	Includes the next nineteen episodes of series fifteen.
Series 15: Part 3	44–65	1999	Includes the next twenty-two episodes of series fifteen.
Series 15: Part 4	66–87	1999	Includes the last twenty-two episodes of series fifteen.
Series 16: Part 1	1–23	2000	Includes the first twenty-three episodes of series sixteen.
Series 16: Part 2	24–45	2000	Includes the next twenty-two episodes of series sixteen.
Series 16: Part 3	46–68	2000	Includes the next twenty-three episodes of series sixteen.
Series 16: Part 4	69–86	2000	Includes the last eighteen episodes of series sixteen.
Series 17: Part 1	1–24	2001	Includes the first twenty-four episodes of series seventeen.
Series 17: Part 2	25–41	2001	Includes the next twenty-two episodes of series seventeen.
Series 17: Part 3	42–70	2001	
Series 17: Part 4	71–92	2001	
Series 18: Part 1	1–24	2002	Includes the first twenty-four episodes of series eighteen.
Series 18: Part 2	25–44	2002	Includes the next twenty episodes of series eighteen.
Series 18: Part 3	45–67	2002	Includes the next twenty-three episodes of series eighteen.
Series 18: Part 4	67–86	2002	Includes the last eighteen episodes of series eighteen.
Series 19: Part 1	1–36	2003	
Series 20: Part 1	1–18	2004	
Series 20: Part 2	19–32	2004	
Series 21: Part 1	1–18	2005	
Series 21: Part 2			
Series 21: Part 3			
Series 21: Part 4			
Series 21: Part 5			
Series 21: Part 6			
Series 22: Part 1			
Series 22: Part 2			
Series 22: Part 3			
Series 22: Part 4			
Series 23: Part 1			
Series 23: Part 2			
Series 23: Part 3			
Series 23: Part 4			
Series 24: Part 1			
Series 24: Part 2			
Series 24: Part 3			
Series 24: Part 4			
Series 25: Part 1			
Series 25: Part 2			
Series 25: Part 3			
Series 26: Part 1			
Series 26: Part 2			
Farewell: The Bill	30–31	2010	Includes the last ever episodes, Respect: Part 1 and Respect: Part 2, plus the behind-the-scenes documentary, Farewell: The Bill (available in standard-definition only).

=== YouTube ===
On 19 March 2013, more than three years since the cancellation on ITV, Fremantle Media began uploading episodes of The Bill onto video-sharing website YouTube. Currently, the first five episodes of the first series are available, with a banner displayed, stating that there are "more episodes coming soon".

In January 2025, Fremantle Media started uploading episodes of The Bill to a new channel on YouTube. Starting with season 1 (including the pilot episode "Woodentop"), all episodes have been uploaded, in order of each season, at a rate of about five a day. As of late April 2026, episodes to the end of season 16 are available.

Opening titles have been stripped to show only a few seconds of the title card. Notably, the "Devised by Geoff McQueen" credit is missing. End credits are also missing.

== Spin-off shows ==
=== Burnside DVD ===
DVD title	Episodes	Years of series	UK release date (Region 2)	North American release date (Region 1)	Australian release date (Region 4)
Burnside: The Complete Series	1–6	2000	9 September 2013	—	18 August 2009; 1 August 2012 (re-released Region Free)

=== Murder Investigation Team DVD ===
DVD title	Episodes	Years of series	UK release date (Region 2)	North American release date (Region 1)	Australian release date (Region 4)
Murder Investigation Team – Series One	1–8	2003	25 October 2004	1 March 2011	—
Murder Investigation Team – Series Two	9–12	2005	—	27 March 2012	—
MIT: Murder Investigation Team: The Complete Series	1–12	2003 & 2005	16 September 2013	—	5 June 2013 (Region Free) in NTSC Format
