= Shirin Taylor =

British actress (born 1951)

Shirin Taylor (born 1951 as Shirin C. Ghadiali) is an English actress, best known for playing Jackie Ingram in the television soap opera Coronation Street from 1990 to 1992 as well as Tina, girlfriend to Robert Lindsay's character in comedy drama Give Us a Break, and Rosa in the sitcom I Woke Up One Morning.

== Early life ==
Born to an Indian father and English mother, Taylor initially trained as a dancer at the Royal Ballet School before studying drama at Bristol Old Vic Theatre School.

== Acting career ==
Year	Title	Role	Notes
1978	Doctor Who: The Stones of Blood	Camper	1 episode
1982	Crown Court	Felicity Coleman	2 episodes
1983	The Cleopatras	Charmiran	3 episodes
1983–84	Give Us a Break	Tina	8 episodes
1984	Shine on Harvey Moon	Nora	1 episode
1984–85	One by One	Miss Seski	1 episode
1985	Crossroads	Sue Kirk	TBC
1985–86	I Woke Up One Morning	Rosa	9 episodes
1986	Boon	Elena Saladin	1 episode
1987	Dramarama	Barba	1 episode
1987	Doctor Who: Dragonfire	Customer	2 episodes
1988	Bust	Sally McLaren	6 episodes
1989	Casualty: A Grand in the Hand	Helen Masters	1 episode
1989–2004	The Bill	various characters	7 episodes
1990	The Ruth Rendell Mysteries	Lillian Hatton	3 episodes
1990–92	Coronation Street	Jackie Ingram	75 episodes
1995	A Touch of Frost	Helen Cartwright	1 episode
1998	Hetty Wainthropp Investigates	Conchita Flintoff	1 episode
1998	London's Burning	Mrs. Danvers	1 episode
1999	Holby City	Eileen Hindell	1 episode
2001	Night & Day	Roxanne's Boss	3 episode
2001	Doctors	Gillian Ashcroft	1 episode

== Theatre work ==
On stage, Taylor made her West End debut in Educating Rita, first as understudy to star Julie Walters and then taking over the role of the leading lady.
