= List of That '70s Show home video releases =

That '70s Show was released on DVD in Regions 1, 2 and 4 by 20th Century Fox Home Entertainment (a then-sister company to the network the show originally aired on, Fox, under license from Carsey-Werner, the show's producer) at an increment of two seasons per year.

The complete series was released in Region 1 on October 14, 2008, the Canadian cost being almost double the U.S. price.

The DVDs contain various bonus features, such as the original promos for the episodes that aired on Fox on the original air date, retrospective interviews with various cast members, and commentaries by director David Trainer on selected episodes.

The first five seasons were released in four slimcases per season with one disc per slimcase, however, beginning with season six, Fox scaled back the sets to two cases with two discs in each. This was also a complaint among collectors. Other complaints of the sets were the reusage of Eric Forman's face twice on the spine and then the discontinuation of characters on the spine. Noticeably also, every set contained the season number on the spine except for season seven.

The music that featured many popular bands was predominantly removed or replaced with stock music on the DVD releases, in order to avoid paying royalties to the artists involved (unlike the actual run of a series, where studios would only have to pay royalties to the artist for that single episode, and maybe for syndication).

Despite his brief appearance in the eighth season, Michael Kelso's image is prominently featured on both the cover and disc art for the season's DVD set, as released by 20th Century Fox. His portrayer Ashton Kutcher's name is credited with the cast which reads "and special guest star: Ashton Kutcher". The re-issue by Mill Creek Entertainment does not include Kelso's image for season eight.

On May 4, 2011, Mill Creek Entertainment announced that they had acquired the rights to re-release the series on DVD in Region 1. They have subsequently re-released all eight seasons on DVD

On October 12, 2011, Mill Creek Entertainment announced that they were working on a Blu-ray release of season 1 and that it would be released on January 10, 2012. However, the date was pushed back to March 20. Season 2 was released on Blu-ray on October 16, 2012. No further seasons were released due to poor sales.

On May 14, 2013, Mill Creek released That '70s Show: The Complete Series on DVD in Region 1.

On November 3, 2015, Mill Creek released That '70s Show: The Complete Series on Blu-ray.

The Mill Creek sets claim to contain the original uncut broadcast edits, with most though not all of the original music intact. However, upon closer inspection, it was revealed that they're mostly repeats of the Fox sets with the majority of the music still omitted.

In Australia, after the release of The Complete Series in 2010, Beyond Home Entertainment acquired the rights to the series and released all 8 seasons individually on December 1, 2011. Then on May 2, 2012, The Complete Collection was released. Then followed The Collector's Edition on August 6, 2014. Followed by The Collector's Set on April 20, 2016. Lastly, The Complete Series on August 1, 2018.

Season	Episodes	Release date			Additional features
Season	Episodes	Region 1	Region 2	Region 4	Additional features
1	25	October 26, 2004; September 13, 2011 (re-release)	May 15, 2005	September 21, 2005 (Parts 1 and 2); May 24, 2006 (Complete season)	"Hello Wisconsin!" Season One Featurette; That '70s Trivia Show; Promo-Palooza
2	26	April 19, 2005; September 13, 2011 (re-release)	September 19, 2005	September 21, 2005 (Parts 1 and 2); May 24, 2006 (Complete season)	Audio Commentaries on "Halloween," "Hunting," and "Cat Fight Club"; Behind the Scenes Webisodes for "Kelso's Serenade," "Jackie Moves On," "Holy Crap!" "Red Fired Up," "Cat Fight Club," and "Moon Over Point Place"; Season 2 Featurette: A Talk with Director David Trainer; Season One: a Look Back
3	25	November 15, 2005; April 3, 2012 (re-release)	February 27, 2006	May 24, 2006	Promos for every episode Director David Trainer and Producer Patrick Kienlen Audio Commentaries on "Too Old to Trick or Treat, too Young to Die," "Eric's Panties," and "Dine & Dash"; Director David Trainer Audio Commentaries on "Radio Daze," "Eric's Drunken Tattoo," and "The Promise Ring" "A Look back at Season Three" featurette Cast Member Introductions by Mila Kunis, Danny Masterson, Wilmer Valderrama, Debra Jo Rupp, Kurtwood Smith, or Don Stark on 18 episodes
4	27	May 9, 2006; April 3, 2012 (re-release)	August 21, 2006	August 9, 2006	Audio Commentaries on "Eric's Depression," "Class Picture," and "Hyde's Birthday"; Promos for every episode A '70s Flashback: Laura Prepon and Mila Kunis "Season 4 in 4 Minutes" featurette Making Company: David Trainer on directing That '70s Show
5	25	October 17, 2006; September 4, 2012 (re-release)	April 2, 2007	April 18, 2007	"Season 5 in 5 Minutes" featurette A '70s Flashback: Danny Masterson and Wilmer Valderrama; Promos for every episode
6	25	May 8, 2007; September 4, 2012 (re-release)	August 6, 2007	August 15, 2007	A '70s Flashback: Debra Jo Rupp and Kurtwood Smith "Six Minutes of Season 6" featurette Audio Commentaries on "Substitute," "Sparks," and "My Wife"; Promos for every episode
7	25	October 16, 2007; March 12, 2013 (re-release)	January 21, 2008	January 23, 2008	A '70s Flashback: Don Stark; 3 Audio Commentaries "Behind The Polyester: Writing That '70s Show" Featurette "That Seventh '70s Season" Featurette; Promos for every episode
8	22	April 1, 2008; March 12, 2013 (re-release)	June 9, 2008	April 9, 2008	A '70s Flashback: Tommy Chong & Josh Meyers; That '70s Set Tour w/ David Trainer; Featurette:That '70s Show retrospective Topher Grace-"Eric"; Ashton Kutcher-"Kelso"; Laura Prepon-"Donna"; Mila Kunis-"Jackie"; Danny Masterson-"Hyde"; Wilmer Valderrama-"Fez"; Kurtwood Smith & Debra Jo Rupp-"Red & Kitty"; Don Stark-"Bob"; Promos for every episode
The Complete Series Stash box	200	October 14, 2008; May 14, 2013 (re-release)	August 16, 2010	January 27, 2010	Includes all of the bonus features on previous DVDs. A "yearbook" including notes from the director, cast interviews, character timelines and photos. A script from the final episode signed by the cast members.
