= List of Twin Peaks home video releases =

The contents of the 10-disc edition of Twin Peaks Gold Box Set

Twin Peaks has had various VHS and DVD releases over the years, with varying degrees of commercial and critical success. Home video releases of Twin Peaks have had problems with rights management, most notably with the delayed DVD release of Season 2.

== International pilot ==
The pilot episode, first shown on TV in the US, was released on home video in Europe in 1989. The international version is 20 minutes longer than the TV pilot, with a different ending added to bring closure to the story. Cooper, Truman, Hawk, and Andy find Laura's murderer, who confesses and then is shot by Mike, the one-armed man. The Red Room dream sequence that ends episode two, where Cooper encounters the Man from Another Place and Laura Palmer, was originally shot for this film. Lynch was so happy with the material that he incorporated part of it into the second episode of the regular series (that is, the third episode shown in the U.S., including the pilot) as a dream Cooper has about the case (at the start of episode three, Cooper gives a scene-by-scene account of the European ending, including references to events seen only in the international pilot and not the dream-sequence version). This version of the pilot was also offered by Warner Home Video in the United States, resulting in a rights-entanglement which prevented the broadcast version of the pilot being released for a number of years. On October 30, 2007, the broadcast version of the pilot finally received a legitimate U.S. release as part of the Twin Peaks "Definitive Gold Box Edition". This set includes both versions of the pilot.

== Home video releases ==
A complete series set of 14 VHS cassettes, distributed by Amuse Video, was released in Japan, selling for the equivalent of US $440. By August 1992, about 15,000 sets had been sold, plus 7,000 sets of equally expensive LaserDiscs. This was despite the fact that the series had been carried only on Wowow, a pay television satellite channel that at the time had about 900,000 subscribers.

On December 18, 2001, the first season (episodes 1-7, minus the pilot) of Twin Peaks was released on DVD in Region 1 by Republic Pictures, which had an output deal through Artisan Entertainment, now part of Lions Gate Entertainment. The box set was noted for being the first TV show to have its audio track redone in DTS. The region 1 release was heavily criticized for not including the key pilot episode, which could not be included due to the fact Lynch sold the rights to it to Warner Home Video in order to facilitate its video release in Europe. When the series was released on video in the US (twice by Spelling Entertainment's Worldvision Home Video), the pilot episode was excluded both times. In turn, Warner Home Video released the pilot on video — however, it was actually the international version, which was designed to work as a standalone feature film and not the series' pilot episode. As a result, it featured an alternate ending which summarized the first sixteen episodes of the series, thus spoiling the series' conclusion and central "murder mystery" entirely. Despite this, Warner simply labelled the pilot as having "bonus footage". The televised pilot episode up to that time had been included in the UK (region 2) DVD release from Universal Home Entertainment. A DVD collection of Season One was released in Australia by Paramount Pictures, in 2001. In 2006, Season 2 was released by the same distributor in two parts (Collections 1 and 2). In addition, the entire series was released in Australia in a box set collector's edition.

The first season DVD box set is known to have production errors, which cause many DVD players to freeze. One known track glitch occurs during the opening credits of episode 2. Another glitch occurs fifteen minutes into episode 4, during Donna and Audrey's scene in the girls' high school restroom. The European DVD box set of season two has an audio flaw where in episode 12, the center and right channels have been flip-flopped. The release of Season Two was complicated by the sale of Spelling Entertainment (which included both Republic Pictures, and the predecessor company, Worldvision Enterprises, the series' former distributor) - and later the transition of video rights - to Paramount/Viacom in 1998; and the 2006 split of Viacom into two separate companies — this saw the rights go to CBS Corporation/CBS Studios. Also, Lynch oversaw the transfer from video to DVD personally, but was delayed by the production of his new film, Inland Empire.

The first season was released on DVD by Artisan Entertainment, the video licensee for Republic, but Artisan/Lions Gate's rights expired in September 2005, and thus were transferred to Viacom subsidiary Paramount. As a result of the 2006 corporate split of CBS and Viacom, CBS Studios (which ended up with Republic Pictures' and Spelling Entertainment's TV holdings) now owns the rights to the original Twin Peaks series, with CBS Television Distribution handling syndication, and Paramount Home Entertainment, the owner of the DVD (and later Blu Ray) rights, using the CBS DVD banner for the series. The second season release was postponed several times, from September 2004, to early 2005, and then to September 2005, to early 2006. Season Two was finally released in the United States and Canada on April 3, 2007 via Paramount Home Entertainment/CBS DVD, which now acts as home video distributor. In Germany, Season 2 was released in two parts on separate dates in April 2007. Part 1 went on general release on January 4, 2007, including the "broadcast" version of the pilot episode. North American rights to the Twin Peaks: Fire Walk with Me film are owned by Janus Films, and is available on blu ray via The Criterion Collection as a stand-alone release, and as part of CBS’ various box sets of the franchise. In Canada, the DVD was distributed through Alliance Atlantis, which holds all Canadian rights to the New Line library.

The sequel series (...The Return, aka Season 3) was both a production of, and owned by, CBS subsidiary Showtime, and has been released on home video in-house (via Paramount, under the Showtime banner).

At the 2007 San Diego Comic-Con, a Twin Peaks box set was confirmed for U.S. release. It includes both seasons, the two versions of the Pilot episode, deleted scenes for both seasons, and a feature-length retrospective documentary. It was released on October 30, 2007. No date as yet has been announced for a UK release. A Netherlands release exists which is Region 2 encoded, however the text on the packaging is in Dutch.

The Definitive Gold Box Set was released in Australia on December 4, 2007. Playback, the company that released Season 1 of Twin Peaks in the UK, announced that Season 2 would be available on Region 2 in the UK at the beginning of 2010. On March 22, 2010, both the second season DVD and the Definitive Gold Box Edition DVD were released in the UK.. On March 14, 2017 the Definitive Gold Box Set was re-released.

The Twin Peaks: The Entire Mystery Blu-ray boxed set was released on July 29, 2014. The set included 90 minutes of missing footage from Twin Peaks: Fire Walk With Me, later to be titled Twin Peaks: The Missing Pieces, as well as the entire film for the first time in a unified boxed set.

== DVD release summary ==
Twin Peaks The First Season
Set details
Special features
- 7 or 8 episodes (Region 1 excluded pilot episode)
- 4-disc set
- 1.33:1 aspect ratio
- Subtitles: English
- English (Dolby Digital 5.1 Surround)
- Directors' audio commentaries
- On-camera interviews with the cast
- Additional interviews with cinema and television experts
- Archival materials from the fanzine for Twin Peaks, Wrapped in Plastic; the official Twin Peaks magazine
- "Log Lady Introductions"
- Written synopsis of pilot episode (because Region 1 excluded pilot)
Release dates
Region 1
Region 2
Region 4
December 18, 2001
November 5, 2002
February 7, 2003

Twin Peaks The Second Season
Set details
Special features
- 22 episodes
- 6-disc set
- 1.33:1 aspect ratio
- Subtitles: English
- English (Dolby Digital 5.1 Surround)
- Interactive Interview Grid
- Behind the scenes
- "Log Lady Introductions"
- Insights by Caleb Deschanel, Duwayne Dunham, Todd Holland, Tim Hunter, Stephen Gyllenhaal, and Jennifer Lynch
Release dates
Region 1
Region 2
Region 4
April 3, 2007
March 22, 2010
April 12, 2007

Twin Peaks: Fire Walk With Me
Set details
Special features
- Film
- 1-disc set
- 1.78:1 aspect ratio
- Subtitles: English
- English (Dolby Digital 2.0 Stereo)
- Original documentary - Reflections on the phenomenon of Twin Peaks by members of the cast and crew
- Featuring new on-camera interviews with crew
- Trailer
Release dates
Region 1
Region 2
Region 4
February 26, 2002
September 17, 2001
September 22, 2005
February 8, 2012

Twin Peaks The Definitive Gold Box Edition
Set details
Special features
- 31 episodes
- 10-disc set
- 1.33:1 aspect ratio
- Subtitles: English
- German, Danish, Finnish, Dutch, Italian, Norwegian, Swedish, Spanish (EU version only)
- English (Dolby Digital 5.1 Surround)
- German, Spanish, Italian (EU version only)
- A Slice of Lynch
- Northwest Passage: Creating the Pilot
- Freshly Squeezed: Creating Season 1
- Where We're From: Creating the Music
- Into the Night: Creating Season 2
- Saturday Night Live sketch (featuring Kyle MacLachlan)
- Return to Twin Peaks
- Interactive map
- "Falling" music video, featuring Julee Cruise
- Georgia Coffee commercials (5 spots)
- Image galleries
  - The Richard Beymer Gallery
  - Unit photography
  - Twin Peaks trading cards
- TV spots
  - Premiere spots (8 spots)
  - There's No Place Like Home spots
  - 1-900 promo ads
  - T-shirt ad
  - Holiday greeting
  - Patriot greeting
Release dates
Region 1
Region 2
Region 4
October 30, 2007
October 30, 2007 (Germany)
March 22, 2010 (UK)
December 4, 2007
