= List of Teenage Mutant Ninja Turtles (2003 TV series) home video releases =

Starting on September 2, 2003, 4Kids Entertainment and Funimation Entertainment began distributing 2003 Teenage Mutant Ninja Turtles animated TV series to DVD, and originally also to VHS. The latest VHS release occurred on June 7, 2005, while the original run of DVD releases continued until October 21, 2008.

== Release pattern ==
Many fans heavily criticized Funimation's erratic release patterns, and while a more traditional seasonal release pattern began in 2007, production ceased following Nickelodeon purchasing the entire TMNT franchise in October 2009. In June 2015, Nickelodeon began once again releasing DVDs of the series. However, they too began an erratic release pattern, with several months between volumes and each volume containing only three non-sequential episodes.

== List ==
Title	Release date
TMNT (2003) Vol. 1: Attack of the Mousers	September 2, 2003
Episodes: S01E01, 001: "Things Change"; S01E02, 002: "A Better Mousetrap"; S01E03, 003: "Attack of the Mousers"
TMNT (2003) Vol. 2: Meet Casey Jones	September 2, 2003
Episodes: S01E04, 004: "Meet Casey Jones"; S01E05, 005: "Nano"; S01E06, 006: "Darkness on the Edge of Town"
TMNT (2003) Vol. 3: The Way of Invisibility	October 14, 2003
Episodes: S01E07, 007: "The Way of Invisibility"; S01E08, 008: "Fallen Angel"; S01E09, 009: "Garbageman"
TMNT (2003) Vol. 4: The Shredder Strikes	October 14, 2003
Episodes: S01E10, 010: "The Shredder Strikes, Part 1"; S01E11, 011: "The Shredder Strikes, Part 2"; S01E12, 012: "The Unconvincing Turtle Titan"
TMNT (2003) Box Set 1 (Vol. 1–4)	November 18, 2003
DVD Set: TMNT (2003) Vol. 1: Attack of the Mousers; TMNT (2003) Vol. 2: Meet Casey Jones; TMNT (2003) Vol. 3: The Way of Invisibility; TMNT (2003) Vol. 4: The Shredder Strikes
TMNT (2003) Vol. 5: Notes from the Underground	January 13, 2004
Episodes: S01E13, 013: "Notes from the Underground, Part 1"; S01E14, 014: "Notes from the Underground, Part 2"; S01E15, 015: "Notes from the Underground, Part 3"
TMNT (2003) Vol. 6: The Shredder Strikes Back	January 13, 2004
Episodes: S01E16, 016: "The King"; S01E17, 017: "The Shredder Strikes Back, Part 1"; S01E18, 018: "The Shredder Strikes Back, Part 2"; S01E19, 019: "Tales of Leo"
TMNT (2003) Vol. 7: Return to New York	March 16, 2004
Episodes: S01E20, 020: "The Monster Hunter"; S01E21, 021: "Return to New York, Part 1"; S01E22, 022: "Return to New York, Part 2"; S01E23, 023: "Return to New York, Part 3"
TMNT (2003) Vol. 8: The Search for Splinter	March 16, 2004
Episodes: S01E24, 024: "Lone Raph and Cub"; S01E25, 025: "The Search for Splinter, Part 1"; S01E26, 026: "The Search for Splinter, Part 2"
TMNT (2003) Vol. 9: Turtles in Space	May 4, 2004
Episodes: S02E01, 027: "Turtles in Space, Part 1: The Fugitoid"; S02E02, 028: "Turtles in Space, Part 2: The Trouble with Triceratons"; S02E03, 029: "Turtles in Space, Part 3: The Big House"; S02E04, 030: "Turtles in Space, Part 4: The Arena"
TMNT (2003) Vol. 10: Secret Origins	June 8, 2004
Episodes: S02E05, 031: "Turtles in Space, Part 5: Triceraton Wars"; S02E06, 032: "Secret Origins, Part 1"; S02E07, 033: "Secret Origins, Part 2"; S02E08, 034: "Secret Origins, Part 3"
TMNT (2003) Vol. 11: The Ultimate Ninja	August 17, 2004
Episodes: S02E09, 035: "Reflections"; S02E10, 036: "The Ultimate Ninja"; S02E11, 037: "Modern Love: The Return of Nano"; S02E18, 044: "The Golden Puck"
TMNT (2003) Vol. 12: Croc Attack!	October 5, 2004
Episodes: S02E12, 038: "What a Croc!"; S02E13, 039: "Return to the Underground"; S02E17, 043: "Junklantis"; S02E21, 047: "April's Artifact"; S02E22, 048: "Return of the Justice Force"
TMNT (2003) Michelangelo's Christmas Rescue	October 19, 2004
Episodes: S03E13, 065: "The Christmas Aliens"; S01E01, 001: "Things Change"; S01E05, 005: "Nano"; S01E10, 010: "The Shredder Strikes, Part 1"
TMNT (2003) Vol. 13: The Battle Nexus	November 9, 2004
Episodes: S02E23, 049: "The Big Brawl, Part 1"; S02E24, 050: "The Big Brawl, Part 2"; S02E25, 051: "The Big Brawl, Part 3"; S02E26, 052: "The Big Brawl, Part 4"
TMNT (2003) Vol. 14: City at War	January 18, 2005
Episodes: S02E14, 040: "City at War, Part 1"; S02E15, 041: "City at War, Part 2"; S02E16, 042: "City at War, Part 3"; S02E19, 045: "Rogue in the House, Part 1"; S02E20, 046: "Rogue in the House, Part 2"
TMNT (2003) 3.1: Ways of the Warrior: Alien Invasion	March 15, 2005
Episodes: S03E01, 053: "Space Invaders, Part 1"; S03E02, 054: "Space Invaders, Part 2"; S03E03, 055: "Space Invaders, Part 3"; S03E08, 060: "Hunted"; S03E12, 064: "The Lesson"
TMNT (2003) 3.2: Ways of the Warrior: Worlds Collide	April 26, 2005
Episodes: S03E04, 056: "Worlds Collide, Part 1"; S03E05, 057: "Worlds Collide, Part 2"; S03E06, 058: "Worlds Collide, Part 3"; S03E07, 059: "Touch and Go"; S03E11, 063: "New Blood"
TMNT (2003) 3.3: Ways of the Warrior: Return of the Ultimate Ninja	June 7, 2005
Episodes: S03E19, 071: "Reality Check"; S03E20, 072: "Across The Universe"; S03E21, 073: "Same As It Never Was"; S03E22, 074: "The Real World, Part 1"; S03E23, 075: "The Real World, Part 2"
TMNT (2003) 3.4: Ways of the Warrior: Shredder's Final Countdown	August 30, 2005
Episodes: S03E25, 077: "Exodus, Part 1"; S03E26, 078: "Exodus, Part 2"; S04E01, 079: "Cousin Sid"; S04E04, 082: "Dragon's Brew"; S04E08, 086: "Bad Day"
TMNT (2003) 3.5: Mutants and Monsters	October 4, 2005
Episodes: S03E14, 066: "The Darkness Within"; S03E16, 068: "The Entity Below"; S03E24, 076: "Bishop's Gambit"; S04E05, 083: "I, Monster"; S04E12, 090: "All Hallows Thieves"
TMNT (2003) 3.6: Turtles Against H.A.T.E.	January 31, 2006
Episodes: S03E09, 061: "H.A.T.E."; S03E15, 067: "Mission of Gravity"; S03E17, 069: "Time Travails"; S04E02, 080: "The People's Choice"; S04E03, 081: "Sons of the Silent Age"
TMNT (2003) 3.7: Hun on the Run	May 16, 2006
Episodes: S03E10, 062: "Nobody's Fool"; S03E18, 070: "Hun on the Run"; S04E06, 084: "Grudge Match"; S04E07, 085: "A Wing and a Prayer"; S04E09, 087: "Aliens Among Us"; S04E10, 088: "Dragon's Rising"
TMNT (2003) Season 4: 14 Episodes	September 12, 2006
Episodes: Disc 1: S04E11, 089: "Still Nobody"; S04E13, 091: "Samurai Tourist"; S04E14, 092: "The Ancient One"; S04E15, 093: "Scion of the Shredder"; S04E16, 094: "Prodigal Son"; S04E17, 095: "Outbreak"; S04E18, 096: "Trouble with Augie"; S04E19, 097: "Insane in the Membrane"; Disc 2: S04E20, 098: "Return of Savanti, Part 1"; S04E21, 099: "Return of Savanti, Part 2"; S04E22, 100: "Tale of Master Yoshi"; S04E23, 101: "Adventures in Turtle Sitting"; S04E24, 102: "Good Genes, Part 1"; S04E25, 103: "Good Genes, Part 2"
TMNT Fast Forward: Future Shellshock!	February 6, 2007
Episodes: Disc 1: S06E01, 118: "Future Shellshock"; S06E02, 119: "Obsolete"; S06E03, 120: "Home Invasion"; S06E04, 121: "Headlock Prime"; S06E05, 122: "Playtime's Over"; S06E06, 123: "Bishop to Knight"; S06E07, 124: "Night of Sh'Okanabo"; Disc 2: S06E08, 125: "Clash of the Turtle Titans"; S06E09, 126: "Fly Me to the Moon"; S06E10, 127: "Invasion of the Body Snatcher!"; S06E11, 128: "The Freaks Come Out at Night"; S06E12, 129: "Bad Blood"; S06E13, 130: "The Journal"
TMNT (2003) Season 1, Part 1	May 22, 2007
Episodes: Disc 1: S01E01, 001: "Things Change"; S01E02, 002: "A Better Mousetrap"; S01E03, 003: "Attack of the Mousers"; S01E04, 004: "Meet Casey Jones"; S01E05, 005: "Nano"; S01E06, 006: "Darkness on the Edge of Town"; Disc 2: S01E07, 007: "The Way of Invisibility"; S01E08, 008: "Fallen Angel"; S01E09, 009: "Garbageman"; S01E10, 010: "The Shredder Strikes, Part 1"; S01E11, 011: "The Shredder Strikes, Part 2"; S01E12, 012: "The Unconvincing Turtle Titan"
TMNT Fast Forward: The Day of Awakening	August 7, 2007
Episodes: Disc 1: S06E14, 131: "The Gaminator"; S06E15, 132: "Graduation Day: Class of 2105"; S06E16, 133: "Timing is Everything"; S06E17, 134: "Enter the Jammerhead"; S06E18, 135: "Milk Run"; S06E19, 136: "The Fall of Darius Dunn"; S06E20, 137: "Turtle X-Tinction"; Disc 2: S06E21, 138: "Race for Glory!"; S06E22, 139: "Head of State"; S06E23, 140: "DNA is Thicker than Water"; S06E24, 141: "The Cosmic Completist"; S06E25, 142: "The Day of Awakening"; S06E26, 143: "Zixxth Sense"; NOTE: The inside cover states the episode "Turtle X-Tinction" is on the second disc but is really on the first.
TMNT (2003) Season 1, Part 2	September 18, 2007
Episodes: Disc 1: S01E13, 013: "Notes from the Underground, Part 1"; S01E14, 014: "Notes from the Underground, Part 2"; S01E15, 015: "Notes from the Underground, Part 3"; S01E16, 016: "The King"; S01E17, 017: "The Shredder Strikes Back, Part 1"; S01E18, 018: "The Shredder Strikes Back, Part 2"; S01E19, 019: "Tales of Leo"; Disc 2: S01E20, 020: "The Monster Hunter"; S01E21, 021: "Return to New York, Part 1"; S01E22, 022: "Return to New York, Part 2"; S01E23, 023: "Return to New York, Part 3"; S01E24, 024: "Lone Raph and Cub"; S01E25, 025: "The Search for Splinter, Part 1"; S01E26, 026: "The Search for Splinter, Part 2"
TMNT (2003) Season 2, Part 1	February 19, 2008
Episodes: Disc 1: S02E01, 027: "Turtles in Space, Part 1: The Fugitoid"; S02E02, 028: "Turtles in Space, Part 2: The Trouble with Triceratons"; S02E03, 029: "Turtles in Space, Part 3: The Big House"; S02E04, 030: "Turtles in Space, Part 4: The Arena"; S02E05, 031: "Turtles in Space, Part 5: Triceraton Wars"; S02E06, 032: "Secret Origins, Part 1"; Disc 2: S02E07, 033: "Secret Origins, Part 2"; S02E08, 034: "Secret Origins, Part 3"; S02E09, 035: "Reflections"; S02E10, 036: "The Ultimate Ninja"; S02E11, 037: "Modern Love: The Return of Nano"; S02E12, 038: "What a Croc!"
TMNT (2003) Ninja Tribunal	May 20, 2008
Episodes: Disc 1: S04E26, 104: "Ninja Tribunal"; S05E01, 105: "Lap of the Gods"; S05E02, 106: "Demons and Dragons"; S05E03, 107: "Legend of the 5 Dragons"; S05E04, 108: "More Worlds Than One"; S05E05, 109: "Beginning of the End"; S05E07, 111: "Membership Drive"; Disc 2: S05E08, 112: "New World Order, Part 1"; S05E09, 113: "New World Order, Part 2"; S05E10, 114: "Fathers and Sons"; S05E11, 115: "Past and Present"; S05E12, 116: "Enter the Dragons, Part 1"; S05E13, 117: "Enter the Dragons, Part 2"
TMNT (2003) Season 2, Part 2	October 21, 2008
Episodes: Disc 1: S02E13, 039: "Return to the Underground"; S02E14, 040: "City at War, Part 1"; S02E15, 041: "City at War, Part 2"; S02E16, 042: "City at War, Part 3"; S02E17, 043: "Junklantis"; S02E18, 044: "The Golden Puck"; S02E19, 045: "Rogue in the House, Part 1"; Disc 2: S02E20, 046: "Rogue in the House, Part 2"; S02E21, 047: "April's Artifact"; S02E22, 048: "Return of the Justice Force"; S02E23, 049: "The Big Brawl, Part 1"; S02E24, 050: "The Big Brawl, Part 2"; S02E25, 051: "The Big Brawl, Part 3"; S02E26, 052: "The Big Brawl, Part 4"
NYC Showdown	June 9, 2015
Episodes: S01E21, 021: "Return to New York, Part 1"; S01E22, 022: "Return to New York, Part 2"; S01E23, 023: "Return to New York, Part 3"
The Search for Splinter	June 9, 2015
Episodes: S01E01, 001: "Things Change"; S01E25, 025: "The Search for Splinter, Part 1"; S01E26, 026: "The Search for Splinter, Part 2"
Meet Casey Jones	TBD (Scheduled for September 15, 2015)
Note: This DVD was announced in a press release but has yet to actually be released for retail sale.
The Shredder Strikes	TBD (Scheduled for September 15, 2015)
Note: This DVD was announced in a press release but has yet to actually be released for retail sale.
Cowabunga Christmas	October 13, 2015
Episodes: S03E13, 065: "The Christmas Aliens"; S01E07, 007: "The Way of Invisibility"; S01E08, 008: "Fallen Angel"
The Ultimate Collection	July 25, 2023
Episodes: Disc 1: S01E01, 001: "Things Change"; S01E02, 002: "A Better Mousetrap"; S01E03, 003: "Attack of the Mousers"; S01E04, 004: "Meet Casey Jones"; S01E05, 005: "Nano"; S01E06, 006: "Darkness on the Edge of Town"; S01E07, 007: "The Way of Invisibility"; S01E08, 008: "Fallen Angel"; S01E09, 009: "Garbageman"; Disc 2: S01E10, 010: "The Shredder Strikes, Part 1"; S01E11, 011: "The Shredder Strikes, Part 2"; S01E12, 012: "The Unconvincing Turtle Titan"; S01E13, 013: "Notes from the Underground, Part 1"; S01E14, 014: "Notes from the Underground, Part 2"; S01E15, 015: "Notes from the Underground, Part 3"; S01E16, 016: "The King"; S01E17, 017: "The Shredder Strikes Back, Part 1"; S01E18, 018: "The Shredder Strikes Back, Part 2"; Disc 3: S01E19, 019: "Tales of Leo"; S01E20, 020: "The Monster Hunter"; S01E21, 021: "Return to New York, Part 1"; S01E22, 022: "Return to New York, Part 2"; S01E23, 023: "Return to New York, Part 3"; S01E24, 024: "Lone Raph and Cub"; S01E25, 025: "The Search for Splinter, Part 1"; S01E26, 026: "The Search for Splinter, Part 2"; S02E01, 027: "Turtles in Space, Part 1: The Fugitoid"; Disc 4: S02E02, 028: "Turtles in Space, Part 2: The Trouble with Triceratons"; S02E03, 029: "Turtles in Space, Part 3: The Big House"; S02E04, 030: "Turtles in Space, Part 4: The Arena"; S02E05, 031: "Turtles in Space, Part 5: Triceraton Wars"; S02E06, 032: "Secret Origins, Part 1"; S02E07, 033: "Secret Origins, Part 2"; S02E08, 034: "Secret Origins, Part 3"; S02E09, 035: "Reflections"; S02E10, 036: "The Ultimate Ninja"; Disc 5: S02E11, 037: "Modern Love: The Return of Nano"; S02E12, 038: "What a Croc!"; S02E13, 039: "Return to the Underground"; S02E14, 040: "City at War, Part 1"; S02E15, 041: "City at War, Part 2"; S02E16, 042: "City at War, Part 3"; S02E17, 043: "Junklantis"; S02E18, 044: "The Golden Puck"; S02E19, 045: "Rogue in the House, Part 1"; Disc 6: S02E20, 046: "Rogue in the House, Part 2"; S02E21, 047: "April's Artifact"; S02E22, 048: "Return of the Justice Force"; S02E23, 049: "The Big Brawl, Part 1"; S02E24, 050: "The Big Brawl, Part 2"; S02E25, 051: "The Big Brawl, Part 3"; S02E26, 052: "The Big Brawl, Part 4"; S03E01, 053: "The Christmas Aliens"; S03E02, 054: "Space Invaders, Part 1"; Disc 7: S03E03, 055: "Space Invaders, Part 2"; S03E04, 056: "Space Invaders, Part 3"; S03E05, 057: "Worlds Collide, Part 1"; S03E06, 058: "Worlds Collide, Part 2"; S03E07, 059: "Worlds Collide, Part 3"; S03E08, 060: "Touch and Go"; S03E09, 061: "Hunted"; S03E10, 062: "H.A.T.E."; S03E11, 063: "Nobody's Fool"; Disc 8: S03E12, 064: "New Blood"; S03E13, 065: "The Lesson"; S03E14, 066: "The Darkness Within"; S03E15, 067: "Mission of Gravity"; S03E16, 068: "The Entity Below"; S03E17, 069: "Time Travails"; S03E18, 070: "Hun on the Run"; S03E19, 071: "Reality Check"; S03E20, 072: "Across The Universe"; Disc 9: S03E21, 073: "Same As It Never Was"; S03E22, 074: "The Real World, Part 1"; S03E23, 075: "The Real World, Part 2"; S03E24, 076: "Bishop's Gambit"; S03E25, 077: "Exodus, Part 1"; S03E26, 078: "Exodus, Part 2"; S04E01, 079: "Cousin Sid"; S04E02, 080: "The People's Choice"; S04E03, 081: "Sons of the Silent Age"; Disc 10: S04E04, 082: "Dragon's Brew"; S04E05, 083: "I, Monster"; S04E06, 084: "Grudge Match"; S04E07, 085: "A Wing and a Prayer"; S04E08, 086: "Bad Day"; S04E09, 087: "Aliens Among Us"; S04E10, 088: "Dragon's Rising"; S04E11, 089: "Still Nobody"; S04E12, 090: "All Hallows Thieves"; Disc 11: S04E13, 091: "Samurai Tourist"; S04E14, 092: "The Ancient One"; S04E15, 093: "Scion of the Shredder"; S04E16, 094: "Prodigal Son"; S04E17, 095: "Outbreak"; S04E18, 096: "Trouble with Augie"; S04E19, 097: "Insane in the Membrane"; S04E20, 098: "Return of Savanti, Part 1"; S04E21, 099: "Return of Savanti, Part 2"; Disc 12: S04E22, 100: "Tale of Master Yoshi"; S04E23, 101: "Adventures in Turtle Sitting"; S04E24, 102: "Good Genes, Part 1"; S04E25, 103: "Good Genes, Part 2"; S04E26, 104: "Ninja Tribunal"; S05E01, 105: "Lap of the Gods"; S05E02, 106: "Demons and Dragons"; S05E03, 107: "Legend of the 5 Dragons"; S05E04, 108: "More Worlds Than One"; Disc 13: S05E05, 109: "Beginning of the End"; S05E06, 110: "Membership Drive"; S05E07, 111: "New World Order, Part 1"; S05E08, 112: "New World Order, Part 2"; S05E09, 113: "Fathers and Sons"; S05E10, 114: "Past and Present"; S05E11, 115: "Enter the Dragons, Part 1"; S05E12, 116: "Enter the Dragons, Part 2"; Disc 14: S06E01, 117: "Future Shellshock"; S06E02, 118: "Obsolete"; S06E03, 119: "Home Invasion"; S06E04, 120: "Headlock Prime"; S06E05, 121: "Playtime's Over"; S06E06, 122: "Bishop to Knight"; S06E07, 123: "Night of Sh'Okanabo"; S06E08, 124: "Clash of the Turtle Titans"; S06E09, 125: "Fly Me to the Moon"; Disc 15: S06E10, 126: "Invasion of the Body Snatcher!"; S06E11, 127: "The Freaks Come Out at Night"; S06E12, 128: "Bad Blood"; S06E13, 139: "The Journal"; S06E14, 130: "The Gaminator"; S06E15, 131: "Graduation Day: Class of 2105"; S06E16, 132: "Timing is Everything"; S06E17, 133: "Enter the Jammerhead"; S06E18, 134: "Milk Run"; Disc 16: S06E19, 135: "The Fall of Darius Dunn"; S06E20, 136: "Turtle X-Tinction"; S06E21, 137: "Race for Glory!"; S06E22, 138: "Head of State"; S06E23, 139: "DNA is Thicker than Water"; S06E24, 140: "The Cosmic Completist"; S06E25, 141: "The Day of Awakening"; S06E26, 142: "Zixxth Sense"; S07E01, 143: "Tempus Fugit"; Disc 17: S07E02, 144: "Karate Schooled"; S07E03, 145: "Something Wicked"; S07E04, 146: "The Engagement Ring"; S07E05, 147: "Hacking Stockman"; S07E06, 148: "Incredible Shrinking Serling"; S07E07, 149: "Identity Crisis"; S07E08, 150: "Web Wranglers"; S07E09, 151: "SuperQuest"; S07E10, 152: "Virtual Reality Check"; Disc 18: S07E11, 153: "City Under Siege"; S07E12, 154: "Super Power Struggle"; S07E13, 155: "Wedding Bells and Bytes"; Turtles Forever

== See also ==
- List of Teenage Mutant Ninja Turtles (2003 TV series) episodes
- List of Teenage Mutant Ninja Turtles (2003 TV series) characters
- List of Teenage Mutant Ninja Turtles (1987 TV series) home video releases
- List of Teenage Mutant Ninja Turtles (2012 TV series) home video releases
