= List of Prisoner home video releases =

The following is a list of home video releases from the Australian television series Prisoner (internationally re-titled Prisoner: Cell Block H in the United States and the United Kingdom, and Caged Women in Canada). The entire series, consisting of 8 seasons and 692 episodes is available in both Australia and the UK. Initially released in "Best Of" compilation format on DVD in Australia with three sets, in the United States with the first two sets, and in the United Kingdom with only the first set.

In Australia, Shock Records commenced releasing what was to be the beginning of the entire series in 2006 in volume format on DVD; the complete series over 40 volumes. Prior to the release of Volume 13, "The Complete Collection" was made available with the remaining individual volumes released subsequently. A second version of "The Complete Collection" was released in 2011. All of the original sets are now out-of-print. As of late 2016, ViaVision are releasing Prisoner on DVD in their original complete season formats.

In the United Kingdom, the series began releasing on VHS with the first 12 episodes over six videos and a video containing episodes 326 & 327. Prisoner Cell Block H DVDs have been released in stages by FremantleMedia Home Entertainment between 2008 - 2013. The content on the discs is identical to the Australian release, but with different cover/sleeve artwork. The UK releases started out as boxed sets of eight discs (32 episodes) with two discs in four cases within each set, but from Volume 4 onwards all the discs are packed into a plastic case with flip disc holders. The entire series has been released over a total of 20 volumes, the first 16 volumes featuring eight discs each but Volume 17 onwards contains ten discs.

The UK DVD releases are a combination of two volumes as released in Australia. For example, the UK Volume 1 consists of the Australian Volumes 1 and 2.

As with the Australian versions of the DVDs, the episodes are on the whole uncut, but due to the aged source of the master tapes, sometimes minor edits are made to the episodes to cover breaks in the picture or sound. "The Edna Pearson Story", released on UK DVD in February 2010, contains most of the previously cut scenes although, episode 470 is still missing a scene.

== VHS ==
=== United States ===
The first 12 episodes of Prisoner: Cell Block H were over six VHS tapes in the United States in 1993 via MPI Home Video

| Title | Release date | Season | Rating | Additional information |
|---|---|---|---|---|
| Episodes 1 & 2 | 23 June 1993 | Season 1 | Not rated | |
| Episodes 3 & 4 | 23 June 1993 | Season 1 | Not rated | |
| Episodes 5 & 6 | 23 June 1993 | Season 1 | Not rated | |
| Episodes 7 & 8 | 23 June 1993 | Season 1 | Not rated | |
| Episodes 9 & 10 | 23 June 1993 | Season 1 | Not rated | |
| Episodes 11 & 12 | 23 June 1993 | Season 1 | Not rated | |

=== United Kingdom ===
NTV Entertainment released eight VHS tapes between 1993 and 1995 in the United Kingdom.

| Title | Release date | Season | Rating | Additional information |
|---|---|---|---|---|
| Episodes 1 & 2 | 1993 | Season 1 | 15 | |
| Episodes 3 & 4 | 1993 | Season 1 | PG | |
| Episodes 5 & 6 | 1993 | Season 1 | PG | |
| Episodes 7 & 8 | 1 February 1994 | Season 1 | 15 | |
| Episodes 9 & 10 | 15 August 1994 | Season 1 | PG | |
| Episodes 11 & 12 | 7 November 1994 | Season 1 | PG | Exclusive interview footage with members of the cast |
| Episodes 326 & 327 | 11 October 1993 | Season 4, episode 80 & Season 5, episodes 1 | 15 | Features the ″Great Fire of Wentworth″ which includes the Season Four finale and the opening episode of Season Five. |

- All episodes from the VHS releases have been re-rated 12 for the DVD releases in United Kingdom for violence, language, drug references, nudity, and sexual threat.
- An additional video, ″The Great Escape″, a behind-the-scenes documentary featured the ″On the Outside″ tour from 1990 and was released on 10 April 1995.

== DVD ==
In North America, Some of the episodes of this soap drama cult classic series were released on Region 1 DVD by A&E Home Entertainment, under licence from FremantleMedia International through the Reg Grundy Organisation from 2004-2007.

=== Compilation releases ===
| Title | Initial release | | | Episodes | No. of discs | Additional information |
| Title | Region 1 | Region 2 | Region 4 | Episodes | No. of discs | Additional information |
|---|---|---|---|---|---|---|
| The Best Of (1) | 30 November 2004 | 22 September 2003 | 18 February 2002 | 12 | 3 | Features: Disc 1 - The Early Years: episodes 166, 287, 327 & 400; Disc 2 - The Terrorist Siege: episodes 550, 551, 550 & bonus episode 536; Disc 3 - The End: episodes 600, 601, 691 & 692; Released as 25th Anniversary Collector's Edition in United States; Also released on VHS format in Australia; Special features: Interviews with Val Lehman (Bea Smith), Anne Phelan (Myra Desmond) & casting director Jan Russ; Clean End Credit Sequence; Photo Gallery - 100 Unseen Continuity Polaroids; Ratings: Not Rated (U.S.); 15 (UK); M (Australia); (also released as individual discs in Australia): Region 2 re-release: 21 October 2013; Region 4 re-release: 4 December 2013 |
| The Best Of (2) | 19 December 2006 | TBA | 24 February 2003 | 12 | 3 | Features: Disc 1 - The Beginning: episodes 1, 2, 3 & 4; Disc 2 - The Great Escapes: episodes 20, 165, 471* & 598; Disc 3 - On the Inside: episodes 247, 248, 586 & 667 (titled A Not So Quiet Riot on Region 1 set); Released as Set 2 in United States; Also released on VHS format in Australia; Special features: Photo Gallery; Post Cards; Ratings: Not Rated (U.S.); M (Australia); (also released as individual discs in Australia) (special features on region 4 only) * Episode 471 was released uncut in the US, but had scenes cut in the Australian version |
| The Best Of (3) | TBA | TBA | 26 July 2004 | 12 | 3 | Features: Disc 1 - Ann and Meg's Kidnapping: episodes 498,499,500 & 501; Disc 2 - Rita at Blackmoor: episodes 664,665,666 & 667; Disc 3 - Lead Up to the Final: episodes 687,688,689 & 690; Also released on VHS format in Australia; Special Features: On the Inside documentary; Ratings: M (Australia) |
| The Edna Pearson Story | TBA | 8 February 2010 | TBA | 8 | 2 | Features: Episodes 463–470; Ratings: 12 (UK) |

=== Region 4 ===
Prisoner is rated M (recommended for mature audiences) for moderate themes, violence, moderate violence, infrequent moderate violence, drug references, moderate drug references, moderate drug use, moderate drug themes and coarse language.

==== Volume sets ====
| Title | Release date | Season | Episodes | No. of discs | ACB rating | Additional information |
|---|---|---|---|---|---|---|
| Volume 1 | 19 October 2006 | Season 1, episodes 1–16 | 16 | 4 | M | Special features: The Wentworth Files: Who's Who; Wentworth Galleria - exclusive & unseen photos |
| Volume 2 | 19 October 2006 | Season 1, episodes 17–32 | 16 | 4 | M | Special features: The Wentworth Files: Who's Who on Both Sides of the Bars; Wentworth Galleria |
| Volume 3 | 20 November 2006 | Season 1, episodes 33–48 | 16 | 4 | M | Special features: Wentworth Galleria |
| Volume 4 | 20 November 2006 | Season 1, episodes 49–64 | 16 | 4 | M | Special features: Inside Out: Morphing Galleria |
| Volume 5 | 17 March 2007 | Season 1, episodes 65–79; Season 2, episode 1; (Episodes 65–80) | 16 | 4 | M | Special features None |
| Volume 6 | 17 March 2007 | Season 2, episodes 2–17; (Episodes 81–96) | 16 | 4 | M | Special features: Hidden Baby Elizabeth Easter Egg |
| Volume 7 | 21 April 2007 | Season 2, episodes 18–33; (Episodes 97–112) | 16 | 4 | M | Special features None |
| Volume 8 | 21 April 2007 | Season 2, episodes 34–49; (Episodes 113–128) | 16 | 4 | M | Special features None |
| Volume 9 | 19 May 2007 | Season 2, episodes 50–65; (Episodes 129–144) | 16 | 4 | M | Special features None |
| Volume 10 | 19 May 2007 | Season 2, episodes 66–81; (Episodes 145–160) | 16 | 4 | M | Special features None |
| Volume 11 | 18 August 2007 | Season 2, episodes 82–86; Season 3, episodes 1–11; (Episodes 161–176) | 16 | 4 | M | Special features None |
| Volume 12 | 20 August 2007 | Season 3, episodes 12–27; (Episodes 177–192) | 16 | 4 | M | Special features None |
| Volume 13 | 20 October 2007 | Season 3, episodes 28–43; (Episodes 193–208) | 16 | 4 | M | Special features: Audio Commentary with Val Lehman and Amanda Muggleton on Episode 195; Episode 200 Introduction from Val Lehman |
| Volume 14 "The Vera Bennett Edition" | 20 October 2007 | Season 3, episodes 44–59; (Episodes 209–224) | 16 | 4 | M | Special features: Reminisce with Fonia Spence; Episode 212 Introduction; Fonia's Edition; Poor Old Vera; Prisoner Advisors; Prisoner Reminisce; UK Tour, The Fans; A Little Bit of Vera; Thoughts and Advise; Episode 217 Introduction; Soft Spot; Prisoner Characters; Vera, 20 Years Later; Episode 223 Introduction; Episode 224 Introduction; Work Together, Play Together; Favourite Storyline; Cast and Crew |
| Volume 15 | 3 November 2007 | Season 3, episodes 60–75; (Episodes 225–240) | 16 | 4 | M | Special features: Reminisce With Val Lehman: The Shower; Letter Bomb |
| Volume 16 | 3 November 2007 | Season 3, episodes 76–81; Season 4, episodes 1–10; (Episodes 241–256) | 16 | 4 | M | Special features: Reminisce With Val Lehman; Dangerous Props; Pigsworth |
| Volume 17 | 16 February 2008 | Season 4, episodes 11–26; (Episodes 257–272) | 16 | 4 | M | Special features None |
| Volume 18 | 16 February 2008 | Season 4, episodes 27–42; (Episodes 273–288) | 16 | 4 | M | Special features: Reminisce With Val Lehman: 1st Time Director |
| Volume 19 | 15 March 2008 | Season 4, episodes 43–58; (Episodes 289–304) | 16 | 4 | M | Special features: Audio Commentary with Amanda Muggleton and Julieanne Newbould on Episode 293 |
| Volume 20 | 15 March 2008 | Season 4, episodes 59–74; (Episodes 305–320) | 16 | 4 | M | Special features None |
| Volume 21 | 12 April 2008 | Season 4, episodes 75–80; Season 5, episodes 1–10; (Episodes 321–336) | 16 | 4 | M | Special features: Audio Commentary with Val Lehman and Jentah Sobott on Episode 327 |
| Volume 22 | 12 April 2008 | Season 5, episodes 11–26; (Episodes 337–352) | 16 | 4 | M | Special features: Reminisce with Val Lehman: K for Killer: Introduction from Val Lehman on episode 342; Prison Food on Set |
| Volume 23 | 14 July 2008 | Season 5, episodes 27–42; (Episodes 353–368) | 16 | 4 | M | Special features: Dear Chrissie: Q&A with Amamda Muggleton: Other Things; Auditions; Chrissie's Return; Funniest Moment; Funniest Moment; Women in Prison; Your Character; Like Mother Like Daughter |
| Volume 24 | 14 July 2008 | Season 5, episodes 43–58; (Episodes 369–384) | 16 | 4 | M | Special features: Dear Chrissie: Q&A with Amanda Muggleton: Looking Good; Chrissie and You; Recurring Character; Favourite Top Dog and Governor; Stunts; Once Off Special; Remake |
| Volume 25 | 18 August 2008 | Season 5, episodes 59–74; (Episodes 385–400) | 16 | 4 | M | Special features: Reminisce with Val Lehman: Prisoner Direction; Logies Surprise; Tough Character; Bea's Last Episode; Drugs |
| Volume 26 | 18 August 2008 | Season 5, episodes 75–90; (Episodes 401–416) | 16 | 4 | M | Special features None |
| Volume 27 | 13 September 2008 | Season 6, episodes 1–16; (Episodes 417–432) | 16 | 4 | M | Special features None |
| Volume 28 | 13 September 2008 | Season 6, episodes 17–32; (Episodes 433–448) | 16 | 4 | M | Special features: Audio Commentary with Tina Bursill and Michael Idato on Episode 433; Audio Commentary with Tina Bursill and Michael Idato on Episode 447 |
| Volume 29 | 13 September 2008 | Season 6, episodes 33–48; (Episodes 449–464) | 16 | 4 | M | Special features None |
| Volume 30 | 13 September 2008 | Season 6, episodes 49–64; (Episodes 465–480) | 16 | 4 | M | Special features None |
| Volume 31 | 18 October 2008 | Season 6, episodes 65–80; (Episodes 481–496) | 16 | 4 | M | Special features: Interview with Anne Phelan |
| Volume 32 | 18 October 2008 | Season 6, episodes 81–89; Season 7, episodes 1–7; (Episodes 497–512) | 16 | 4 | M | Special features None |
| Volume 33 | 18 October 2008 | Season 7, episodes 8–23; (Episodes 513–528) | 16 | 4 | M | Special features None |
| Volume 34 | 18 October 2008 | Season 7, episodes 24–47; (Episodes 529–552) | 24 | 6 | M | Special features None |
| Volume 35 | 15 November 2008 | Season 7, episodes 48–71; (Episodes 553–576) | 24 | 6 | M | Special features None |
| Volume 36 | 15 November 2008 | Season 7, episodes 72–83; Season 8, episodes 1–12; (Episodes 577–600) | 24 | 6 | M | Special features: Audio Commentary on Episode 595 with Glenda Linscott and Lois Collinder; Interview with Casting Director Jan Russ |
| Volume 37 | 15 November 2008 | Season 8, episodes 13–36; (Episodes 601–624) | 24 | 6 | M | Special features None |
| Volume 38 | 15 November 2008 | Season 8, episodes 37–60; (Episodes 625–648) | 24 | 6 | M | Special features None |
| Volume 39 | 1 January 2009 | Season 8, episodes 61–84; (Episodes 649–672) | 24 | 6 | M | Special features None |
| Volume 40 | 1 January 2009 | Season 8, episodes 85–104; (Episodes 673–692) | 20 | 5 | M | Special features None |
| The Complete Collection | Original release: 29 September 2007; Re-release: 5 October 2011 | Seasons 1–8; 692 episodes | 692 | 174 | M | Special features: All special features between Volumes 1–40; Bonus Disc 174 |

==== Complete season sets ====
In late 2016, Australian distribution company ViaVision commenced releasing the series in their complete season formats on DVD and is under its original title of Prisoner as opposed to the Region 4 volume sets which contained the international title Prisoner: Cell Block H.

| Title | Release date | Episodes | No. of discs | ACB rating | Additional information |
|---|---|---|---|---|---|
| The Complete Season One | 2 November 2016 | 79 | 20 | M | Special features Photo Gallery Behind The Scenes |
| The Complete Season Two | 11 January 2017 | 86 | 21 | M | Special features None |
| The Complete Season Three | 8 February 2017 | 81 | 21 | M | Special features None |
| The Complete Season Four | 8 March 2017 | 80 | 21 | M | Special features TBA |
| The Complete Season Five | 5 April 2017 | 90 | 23 | M | Special features TBA |
| The Complete Season Six | 7 June 2017 | 89 | 22 | M | Special features Audio Commentary x 2 Interview x 1 |
| The Complete Season Seven | 8 August 2017 | 83 | 21 | M | Special features TBA |
| The Complete Season Eight | 6 September 2017 | 104 | 26 | M | Special features 2 x Audio Commentary Interview |

==== Collection sets ====
| Title | Release date | Episodes | No. of discs | ACB rating | Features |
|---|---|---|---|---|---|
| Collection One: Seasons One & Two | 2 February 2022 | 165 | 41 | M | TBA |
| Collection Two: Seasons Three & Four | 6 April 2022 | 161 | 42 | M | TBA |
| Collection Three: Seasons Five & Six | 20 July 2022 | 179 | 45 | M | TBA |
| Collection Four: Seasons Seven & Eight | 21 September 2022 | 187 | 47 | M | TBA |
| The Complete Series (Limited Edition) | 6 November 2024 | 692 | 175 | M | |

=== Region 2 ===
In the United Kingdom, Prisoner: Cell Block H was released via Fremantle Home Entertainment, beginning late 2008. The complete series was released through 20 volumes containing 32 episodes per set for the first sixteen volumes; Volume 17 contains 40 episodes, Volume 18 and Volume 19 both contain 48 episodes and the final volume contains 44 episodes. The reason for the increased number of episodes on later sets was due to the fact that Fremantle wanted to keep exactly double the number of episodes as the original Australian sets. The first 33 Australian releases contain 16 episodes per set; sets 34 to 39 containing 24 episodes per set and Volume 40 containing 20 episodes. Therefore, Fremantle in the UK doubled-up on episodes so that they could finish releasing by Volume 20.

In Australia, distribution company Shock Records began releasing the UK volumes in 2011, as their original volumes are now out of print. The final volume was released in early 2014.

| DVD title | Release date | | Features |
| DVD title | Region 2 | Region 4 | Features |
|---|---|---|---|
| Volume 1: Episodes 1–32 | 10 November 2008 | 9 March 2011 | Season 1, episodes 1–32; 32 episodes; 8-disc set; BBFC rating: 15; ACB: M; Special features: Commentary on Episode 1 from produce Ian Bradley; Who's Who of Wentworth: Case Files; Meet the Press Game; The Wentworth Files: Who's Who on Both Sides of the Bars; Wentworth Galleria: photos and production stills from the show |
| Volume 2: Episodes 33–64 | 1 June 2009 | 9 March 2011 | Season 1, episodes 33–64; 32 episodes; 8-disc set; BBFC rating: 12; ACB: M; Special features: Wentworth Galleria; Inside out - Morphing Gallery |
| Volume 3: Episodes 65–96 | 12 October 2009 | 11 May 2011 | Season 1, episodes 65–79; Season 2, episodes 1–17; 32 episodes; 8-disc set; BBFC rating: 12; ACB: M |
| Volume 1–3: Episodes 1–96 | 30 November 2009 | No release | Complete Season 1 (episodes 1–79); Season 2, episodes 1–17; 96 episodes; 24-disc set; BBFC rating: 15; See individual releases for special features |
| Volume 4: Episodes 97–128 | 24 May 2010 | 29 July 2011 | Season 2, episodes 18–49; 32 episodes; 8-disc set; BBFC rating: 12; ACB: M |
| Volume 5: Episodes 129–160 | 11 October 2010 | 30 November 2011 | Season 2, episodes 50–81; 32 episodes; 8-disc set; BBFC rating: 12; ACB: M |
| Volume 6: Episodes 161–192 | 21 February 2011 | 1 February 2012 | Season 2, episodes 82–86; Season 3, episodes 1–27; 32 episodes; 8-disc set; BBFC rating: 15; ACB: M |
| Volume 7: Episodes 193–224 | 18 April 2011 | 7 May 2012 | Season 3, episodes 28–59; 32 episodes; 8-disc set; BBFC rating: 12; ACB: M |
| Volume 8: Episodes 225–256 | 27 June 2011 | 4 July 2012 | Season 3, episodes 60–81; Season 4, episodes 1–10; 32 episodes; 8-disc set; BBFC rating: 12; ACB: M; Special features: Reminiscing with Val Lehman: Val's anecdotes about the showers; Letterbomb; Dangerous Props; Pigsworth |
| Volume 9: Episodes 257–288 | 29 August 2011 | 5 September 2012 | Season 4, episodes 11–42; 32 episodes; 8-disc set; BBFC rating: 12; ACB: M |
| Volume 10: Episodes 289–320 | 31 October 2011 | 5 September 2012 | Season 4, episodes 43–74; 32 episodes; 8-disc set; BBFC rating: 15; ACB: M |
| Volume 11: Episodes 321–352 | 20 February 2012 | 6 February 2013 | Season 4, episodes 75–80; Season 5, episodes 1–26; 32 episodes; 8-disc set; BBFC rating: 15; ACB: M |
| Volume 12: Episodes 353–384 | 12 March 2012 | 6 February 2013 | Season 5, episodes 27–58; 32 episodes; 8-disc set; BBFC rating: 12; ACB: M |
| Volume 13: Episodes 385–416 | 20 April 2012 | 1 May 2013 | Season 5, episodes 59–90; 32 episodes; 8-disc set; BBFC rating: 15; ACB: M |
| Volume 14: Episodes 417–448 | 20 July 2012 | 1 May 2013 | Season 6, episodes 1–32; 32 episodes; 8-disc set; BBFC rating: 12; ACB: M |
| Volume 15: Episodes 449–480 | 6 August 2012 | 3 July 2013 | Season 6, episodes 33–64; 32 episodes; 8-disc set; BBFC rating: 12; ACB: M |
| Volume 16: Episodes 481–512 | 24 September 2012 | 3 July 2014 | Season 6, episodes 65–89; Season 7, episodes 1–7; 32 episodes; 8-disc set; BBFC rating: 12; ACB: M |
| Volume 17: Episodes 513–552 | 5 November 2012 | 16 October 2013 | Season 7, episodes 8–47; 40 episodes; 10-disc set; BBFC rating: 12; ACB: M |
| Volume 18: Episodes 553–600 | 25 February 2013 | 16 October 2013 | Season 7, episodes 48–83; Season 8, episodes 1–12; 48 episodes; 12-disc set; BBFC rating: 15; ACB: M |
| Volume 19: Episodes 600–648 | 25 March 2013 | 8 January 2014 | Season 8, episodes 13–60; 48 episodes; 12-disc set; BBFC rating: 15; ACB: M |
| Volume 20: Episodes 649–692 | 13 May 2013 | 8 January 2014 | Season 8, episodes 61–104; 44 episodes; 11-disc set + bonus disc; BBFC rating: 15; ACB: M |
