= Stay Lucky =

British television series, 1989 to 1993

- DVD cover.
- Genre: Drama
- Created by: Geoff McQueen
- Written by: Geoff McQueen; Alan Whiting; Michael Aitkens
- Directed by: Graeme Harper; David Reynolds
- Starring: Dennis Waterman; Jan Francis; Emma Wray; Niall Toibin; Susan George; Ian McNeice; Leslie Ash; Dougray Scott
- Composer: John Powell
- Country of origin: United Kingdom
- Original language: English
- No. of series: 4
- No. of episodes: 27

Production
- Executive producer: David Reynolds
- Producer: Andrew Benson
- Production locations: Leeds, West Yorkshire, England
- Running time: 60 minutes (including adverts)
- Production company: Yorkshire Television

Original release
- Network: ITV
- Release: 8 December 1989 – 6 August 1993

Stay Lucky is a British television comedy-drama series ran from 8 December 1989 to 6 August 1993. Made by Yorkshire Television and screened on the ITV network, it starred Jan Francis (series 1 to 3) and Dennis Waterman.

== Plot ==
Drama about a small-time gangster Thomas Gynn (Dennis Waterman) from London who discovers a new life up north in Yorkshire.

Helping widowed, self-sufficient businesswoman Sally Hardcastle (Jan Francis) when her car breaks down on the motorway, Thomas reluctantly accepts an offer of a lift to Leeds.

Over the coming months, the two become involved in a series of misadventures that soon find them being drawn closer together.

== Cast ==
- Dennis Waterman as Thomas Gynn
- Jan Francis as Sally Hardcastle
- Emma Wray as Pippa
- Niall Toibin as John Lively
- Susan George as Samantha Mansfield
- Ian McNeice as Franklyn Bysouth
- Leslie Ash as Jo Blake
- Dougray Scott as Alex
- Willie Ross as Barney Potter
- Chris Jury as Kevin
- James Grout as Ken Warren
- Lou Hirsch as Monty
- Mac McDonald as Vinny

Others include Paul Chapman, Belinda Lang, Rula Lenska, Amanda Noar and Rosemary Martin.

== Episodes ==
Series	Episodes	Originally released	
Series	Episodes	First released	Last released
1	3	8 December 1989	22 December 1989
2	7	29 September 1990	10 November 1990
3	7	12 October 1991	23 November 1991
4	10	4 June 1993	6 August 1993

=== Series 1 (1989) ===
No. overall	No. in series	Title	Directed by	Written by	Original release date
1	1	"A1 Rain Dancer"	David Reynolds	Geoff McQueen	8 December 1989
2	2	"The Howling"	David Reynolds	Geoff McQueen	15 December 1989
3	3	"Fool's Gold"	David Reynolds	Geoff McQueen	22 December 1989

=== Series 2 (1990) ===
No. overall	No. in series	Title	Directed by	Written by	Original release date
4	1	"Burning Your Boats"	David Reynolds	Geoff McQueen	29 September 1990
5	2	"Bring Back My Barney to Me!"	Graeme Harper	Michael Aitkens	6 October 1990
6	3	"A Woman's Lot"	John Glenister	Michael Aitkens	13 October 1990
7	4	"The Devil Wept in Leeds"	David Reynolds	Steven Moffat	20 October 1990
8	5	"Trial by Marriage"	Graeme Harper	Michael Aitkens	27 October 1990
9	6	"Hotrod Horace"	David Reynolds	Geoff McQueen	3 November 1990
10	7	"Bigamy Blues"	John Glenister	Geoff McQueen	10 November 1990

=== Series 3 (1991) ===
No. overall	No. in series	Title	Directed by	Written by	Original release date
11	1	"Poetic Justice"	Lawrence Gordon Clark	Geoff McQueen	12 October 1991
12	2	"The Food of Love"	Graeme Harper	Michael Aitkens	19 October 1991
13	3	"Hard Times, Hard Men"	David Reynolds	Michael Aitkens	26 October 1991
14	4	"An Unsavoury Business"	David Reynolds	Alan Whiting	2 November 1991
15	5	"The Sisters of Achill"	Graeme Harper	Geoff McQueen	9 November 1991
16	6	"A Roman Empire"	Lawrence Gordon Clark	Alan Whiting	16 November 1991
17	7	"Shingle Beach"	David Reynolds	Geoff McQueen	23 November 1991

=== Series 4 (1993) ===
No. overall	No. in series	Title	Directed by	Written by	Original release date
18	1	"Flameproof and Free!"	Keith Washington	Geoff McQueen	4 June 1993
19	2	"The Driving Instructor"	Ian White	Alan Whiting	11 June 1993
20	3	"A Quick Killing"	Keith Washington	Jonathan Rich, Julian Jones	18 June 1993
21	4	"Down to Earth"	David Reynolds	Jeff Povey	25 June 1993
22	5	"The Long Road... There!"	Lawrence Gordon Clark	Alan Whiting	2 July 1993
23	6	"The Long Road... Back!"	Lawrence Gordon Clark	Alan Whiting	9 July 1993
24	7	"Gilding the Lily"	Steve Goldie	Jeff Povey	16 July 1993
25	8	"Blowing Bubbles"	Mike Vardy	Bernard Dempsey	23 July 1993
26	9	"Sand Dancer"	Mike Vardy	Geoff McQueen	30 July 1993
27	10	"One Jump Ahead"	David Reynolds	Geoff McQueen	6 August 1993

== Locations ==
- Clarence Dock, Leeds, West Yorkshire, England, UK (Series 1 – Sally's boatyard)
- Canal Basin, Sowerby Bridge, West Yorkshire, England, UK (Series 2 and 3 – Sally's boatyard)
- Armley Mills Industrial Museum, Armley, Leeds, West Yorkshire, England, UK (Series 4 – The Yorkshire Industrial Museum)
