= List of NCIS: Los Angeles home video releases =

The following is a complete list of home video releases for the CBS television series NCIS: Los Angeles. The first five seasons have been released on DVD in Regions 1, 2, and 4, and Season 1 was released on Blu-ray Disc in Region A. The first season DVD release includes the introductory episodes that aired as part of the sixth season of NCIS, which were also included on the NCIS Season 6 DVD set. All releases are distributed by Paramount Home Entertainment through CBS Home Entertainment.

== Box sets ==
=== DVD ===
| Title | Set details | DVD release dates | | | Special features | Ref. |
| Title | Set details | Region 1 | Region 2 | Region 4 | Special features | Ref. |
|---|---|---|---|---|---|---|
| NCIS: Los Angeles: The First Season | Discs: 6; Episodes: 24; Runtime: 1,035 minutes | August 31, 2010 | August 2, 2010 | August 19, 2010 | Inspired Television: NCIS: L.A.; The L.A. Team: Meet the Cast and Crew; Inside the Inner Sanctum: The Set Tour; Do You Have a Visual? Inside the OPS Center; Lights, Camera...Action! The Stunts of NCIS: L.A.; CBS Promos; LL Cool J Music Video "No Crew Is Superior"; Making of "No Crew Is Superior"; Commentary by Shane Brennan on "Identity"; Legend (Parts I and II) from NCIS Season 6, the pilots for NCIS: Los Angeles | |
| NCIS: Los Angeles: The Second Season | Discs: 6; Episodes: 24; Runtime: 1,038 minutes | August 23, 2011 | August 22, 2011 | September 1, 2011 | Absolution – The Table Read; Shooting Up L.A.: The Cinematography of NCIS: Los Angeles; Location, Location, Location; Uncovering Season 2; There's Something About Hetty; Commentary by Eric Christian Olsen and Daniela Ruah on "Anonymous" | |
| NCIS: Los Angeles: The Third Season | Discs: 6; Episodes: 24; Runtime: 1,029 minutes | August 21, 2012 | August 27, 2012 | August 1, 2012 | Deleted scenes: "Lange, H.", "Betrayal", "The Debt," and "Blye, K. Part 2"; Raise the Roof; Dishing... with Barrett and Renee; Aligning the Stars; Carmageddon; Commentary by Daniela Ruah and Eric Christian Olsen on "Neighborhood Watch"; Investigating Season 3; Surf and Turf; "Pa Make Loa" | |
| NCIS: Los Angeles: The Fourth Season | Discs: 6; Episodes: 24; Runtime: 1,032 minutes | August 20, 2013 | August 19, 2013 | August 14, 2013 | Sound Off; Chris at the Helm; Un4gettable: Season Four of NCIS: Los Angeles; Some Assembly Required; Commentary by Daniela Ruah and Eric Christian Olsen on "Wanted"; Commentary by Barrett Foa and Renee Felice Smith on "Recruit" | |
| NCIS: Los Angeles: The Fifth Season | Discs: 6; Episodes: 24; Runtime: 1,030 minutes | August 19, 2014 | August 18, 2014 | August 20, 2014 | Commentary by Daniela Ruah and Eric Christian Olsen; Commentary by Renee Felice Smith and Barrett Foa; Happy 100th; Unexpected Developments; The Write Staff; No Crew Is Superior remix; Deleted Scenes; Crafting Afghanistan | |
| NCIS: Los Angeles: The Sixth Season | Discs: 6; Episodes: 24; Runtime: 1,027 minutes | August 18, 2015 | September 14, 2015 | August 26, 2015 | | |
| NCIS: Los Angeles: Season 7 | Discs: 6; Episodes: 24; Runtime: 979 minutes | August 30, 2016 | September 19, 2016 | September 29, 2016 | | |
| NCIS: Los Angeles: Season 8 | Discs: 6; Episodes: 24; Runtime: 1,057 minutes | August 22, 2017 | September 18, 2017 | August 30, 2017 | | |
| NCIS: Los Angeles: Season 9 | Discs: 6; Episodes: 23; Runtime: 977 minutes | August 28, 2018 | September 17, 2018 | August 15, 2018 | | |
| NCIS: Los Angeles: Season 10 | Discs: 6; Episodes: 24; Runtime: 1,012 minutes | August 27, 2019 | September 23, 2019 | August 28, 2019 | | |
| NCIS: Los Angeles: Season 11 | Discs: 5; Episodes: 22; Runtime: 1,000 minutes | August 4, 2020 | TBA | TBA | | |
| NCIS: Los Angeles: Season 12 | Discs: 5; Episodes: 18; Runtime: | August 24, 2021 | TBA | TBA | | |
| NCIS: Los Angeles: Season 13 | Discs: 5; Episodes: 22; Runtime: | August 23, 2022 | TBA | TBA | | |
| NCIS: Los Angeles: The Final Season | Discs: 6; Episodes: 21; Runtime: | September 5, 2023 | TBA | TBA | | |

=== Blu-ray Disc ===
| Title | Set details | Blu-ray Disc release dates | | Special features | Ref. |
| Title | Set details | Region A | Region B | Special features | Ref. |
|---|---|---|---|---|---|
| NCIS: Los Angeles: The First Season | Discs: 5; Episodes: 24; Runtime: 1,035 minutes | August 31, 2010 | —N/a | Inspired Television: NCIS: L.A.; The L.A. Team: Meet the Cast and Crew; Inside the Inner Sanctum: The Set Tour; Do You Have a Visual? Inside the OPS Center; Lights, Camera...Action! The Stunts of NCIS: L.A.; CBS Promos; LL Cool J Music Video "No Crew Is Superior"; Making of "No Crew Is Superior"; Commentary by Shane Brennan on "Identity"; Legend (Parts I and II) from NCIS Season 6, the pilots for NCIS: Los Angeles; Exclusive Special Features via BD-Live | |

== DVD compilations ==
| Title | Set details | DVD release dates | | | Special features | Ref. |
| Title | Set details | Region 1 | Region 2 | Region 4 | Special features | Ref. |
|---|---|---|---|---|---|---|
| NCIS: Los Angeles: Seasons 1–3 | Discs: 18; Episodes: 72; Runtime: 3,102 minutes | August 21, 2012 | —N/a | —N/a | Includes all special features from seasons 1–3 | |
| NCIS: Los Angeles: Seasons 1–4 | Discs: 24; Episodes: 96; Runtime: 4,134 minutes | August 20, 2013 | —N/a | August 14, 2013 | Includes all special features from seasons 1–4 | |
| NCIS: Los Angeles: Seasons 1–5 | Discs: 30; Episodes: 120; Runtime: 5,164 minutes | August 19, 2014 | August 18, 2014 | August 20, 2014 August 28, 2019 (Re-Release) | Includes all special features from seasons 1–5 | |
| NCIS: Los Angeles: Seasons 6–10 | Discs: 30; Episodes: 118; Runtime: 5,052 minutes | N/A | N/A | August 28, 2019 | | |
| NCIS: Los Angeles: The Complete Series | Discs: 81; Episodes: 323; Runtime: | N/A | N/A | September 5, 2023 | | |
