= List of Hi-5 home video releases =

Hi-5 is an Australian children's television series, originally produced by Kids Like Us and later Southern Star for the Nine Network and created by Helena Harris and Posie Graeme-Evans. The program is known for its educational content, and for the cast of the program, who became a recognised musical group for children outside of the series, known collectively as Hi-5. It has generated discussion about what is considered appropriate television for children. The series premiered in April 1999 on the Nine Network and aired until 2011, before returning to Nine in 2017 with a revived series.

In Australia, Roadshow Entertainment have released selected songs and segments from the television series, compiled on VHS and later DVD, for home video consumption. Each compilation release usually featured three feature Songs of the Week and a range of segments from the corresponding television series, selected to reflect the specific theme of the video. In 2012 and 2013, selected full episodes were released on DVD. Roadshow also distributed three DVDs featuring Hi-5 performing live stage shows, entitled Hi-5 Live! The Playtime Concert (2009), Hi-5 Surprise! Live (2010) and Hi-5 Holiday! Live (2012). These releases did not feature any footage from the television series.

The home video releases were typically well received by the target audience. In its first three months, Move Your Body had sold 80,000 copies on VHS. Summer Rainbows was the highest selling VHS title for Australian children in 1999 and Star Dreaming was the most sold in 2000. The Summer Rainbows / Move Your Body double release was the highest selling DVD in 2003, and Surfing Safari was the highest selling VHS of the same year. Playing Cool (2001) was certified as double platinum by the time of its 2004 DVD release.

== Compilation releases ==
Series	DVD Title	Release Date (Region 4)	Songs of the Week	Special features	Ref.
1	Move Your Body	VHS: June 1999; DVD: 19 February 2003 (Note: Move Your Body and Summer Rainbows were made available on DVD as part of a double release.)	Move Your Body; Ready or Not; L.O.V.E.	—N/a	
1	Summer Rainbows	VHS: 1999; DVD: 19 February 2003	Living in a Rainbow; Grow; Five Senses	—N/a	
1	Star Dreaming	VHS: 13 March 2000; DVD: 9 April 2002	Dream On; You and Me; In a Different Place	Audio commentary by Helena Harris (creator) and Helen Martin (early childhood advisor)	
2	Animal Adventures	VHS: 10 July 2000; DVD: 10 March 2004	So Many Animals; Special Days; North, South, East and West	—N/a	
2	Music Machine	VHS: 30 October 2000; DVD: 9 April 2002	Robot Number One; Mirror, Mirror; Feel the Beat	Audio commentary by Helena Harris (creator) and Helen Martin (early childhood advisor)	
2	Snow Party	VHS: April 2001; DVD: 3 August 2005	It's a Party; Feelings; Three Wishes	—N/a	
3	Five Alive	VHS: 3 September 2001; DVD: 1 October 2003	Boom Boom Beat; Friends; Rain Rain	—N/a	
3	Playing Cool	VHS: 19 November 2001; DVD: 11 February 2004	You're My Number One; Let's Get to Work; I Spy	—N/a	
3	Magical Treasures	VHS: 25 February 2002; DVD: 9 September 2004	I Can Go Anywhere (Note: Labelled as "Let's Pretend"); Opposites Attract; Buried Treasure	—N/a	
4	Let's Celebrate	VHS: 21 October 2002; DVD: 9 September 2004	Celebrate; Hand in Hand; Inside My Heart	—N/a	
4	Surfing Safari	VHS / DVD: 2 April 2003	Going Out; Give it a Go; Reach Out	—N/a	
4	Hi-Energy	VHS / DVD: 13 August 2003	E-N-E-R-G-Y; One Step Forward; Move It!	—N/a	
5	It's a Hi-5 Christmas	VHS / DVD: 12 November 2003	Sleigh Ride	Christmas Eve concert featurette	
5	Hi-5 Holiday	VHS / DVD: 8 April 2004	Holiday; Underwater Discovery; Give Five	—N/a	
5	Come On and Party	VHS / DVD: 8 July 2004	Come On and Party; Build it Up; L.O.V.E.	—N/a	
5	Space Magic	VHS / DVD: 7 October 2004	Hi-5 Base to Outer Space; Dream On; I Believe in Magic	—N/a	
6	Space Magic	VHS / DVD: 7 October 2004	Hi-5 Base to Outer Space; Dream On; I Believe in Magic	—N/a	
7	Action Heroes	VHS / DVD: 7 July 2005	Action Hero; T.E.A.M.; Planet Disco	—N/a	
7	Wonderful Journeys	VHS / DVD: 1 December 2005	Some Kind of Wonderful; Come Around to My Place; Rainbow 'Round the World	—N/a	
7	Mix it Up	DVD: 6 July 2006	Making Music; Ch-Ch-Changing; City and Country (Note: Labelled as "Home Sweet Home")	—N/a	
8	Sharing Wishes	DVD: 1 November 2006	Share Everything with You; Special; Wish Upon a Star	—N/a	
8	Have Some Fun	DVD: 21 February 2007	Have Some Fun; Peek-a-Boo; Growing Up	—N/a	
8	Travelling Circus (Note: While primarily featuring content from Series 8, this release also contains three segments from Series 9 (Episode 30, "Circus").)	DVD: 4 July 2007	Pretending Day; Are We There Yet?; Hey, What's Cooking!	—N/a	
9	Travelling Circus	DVD: 4 July 2007	Pretending Day; Are We There Yet?; Hey, What's Cooking!	—N/a	
9	Team Hi-5	DVD: 7 November 2007	Happy Today; Strong and Brave; Switching	"T.E.A.M." song	
9	Party Street	DVD: 2 April 2008	Wow!; Stop and Go; Party Street	—N/a	
9	Go Wild!	DVD: 19 June 2008	Around the World; Time Machine; Love All Around	—N/a	
10	Playtime!	DVD: 2 October 2008	Playtime; When I Grow Up; Planet Earth; Techno World; Abracadabra	"Hi-5's Cool Dance School" featurette, including songs "Celebrate", "Hi-5 Base to Outer Space", "How Much Do I Love You?", "E-N-E-R-G-Y" and "Going Out".	
10	Jump and Shout	DVD: 5 January 2009	Jump and Shout; Come Alive; We're a Family; The Best Things in Life Are Free	"Hi-5's Cool Dance School" featurette, including songs "Give Five", "Come On and Party", "I Believe in Magic", "Holiday" and "Underwater Discovery".	
11	Fun with Friends	DVD: 1 October 2009	Zoo Party; Knock, Knock, Knock; Spin Me Round	—N/a	
11	Santa Claus is Coming	DVD: 3 December 2009	Santa Claus is Coming; Living in a Fairytale; Favourite Teddy Bear; Let's Get Away	—N/a	
11	Stop, Look and Listen	DVD: 7 January 2010	Stop, Look, Listen; Four Seasons; Happy Monster Dance	—N/a	
11	Sharing Stories	DVD: 18 March 2010	Living in a Fairytale; Spin Me Round; Zoo Party; Knock, Knock, Knock; Favourite Teddy Bear; Four Seasons; Let's Get Away; Stop, Look, Listen; Happy Monster Dance	—N/a	
12	Imagine That	DVD: 7 October 2010	Martian Groove; Hi-5 Farm; Stand Up Tall on Tippy Toes	—N/a	
12	Happy Hi-5 House	DVD: 6 January 2011	Happy House; Toy Box; Backyard Adventurers	—N/a	
12	Hey Presto	DVD: 3 March 2011	Hey Presto!; The Dancing Bus; Turn the Music Up!	—N/a	
12	Sharing Stories 2	DVD: 2 June 2011	Turn the Music Up!; Hi-5 Farm; Toy Box; Hey Presto!; Stand Up Tall on Tippy Toes; Backyard Adventurers; Martian Groove; Happy House; The Dancing Bus	—N/a	
13	Amazing	DVD: 17 November 2011	Wow! (Note: Labelled as "Amazing"); Underwater Discovery; L.O.V.E.	—N/a	
13	Ready or Not	DVD: 5 January 2012	Ready or Not; Robot Number One; Five Senses	—N/a	
13	Make a Wish	DVD: 1 March 2012	Wish Upon a Star; Making Music; Some Kind of Wonderful (Note: Labelled as "Wonderful")	—N/a	
13	Sharing Stories 3	DVD: 21 June 2012	Making Music; Underwater Discovery; Wish Upon a Star; Robot Number One; Wow!; L.O.V.E.; Five Senses; Ready or Not; Some Kind of Wonderful	"Chats with Chats" featurette	

== Full episode releases ==
Series	DVD Title	Release Date (Region 4)	Songs of the Week	Episodes	Special features	Ref.
12	Fun & Games	DVD: 5 September 2012	The Dancing Bus; Happy House; Toy Box	"Summer Holiday" (Series 12, Episode 22); "Backyard Games" (Series 12, Episode 18); "Games" (Series 12, Episode 28)	—N/a	
13	Discovery	DVD: 14 November 2012	Wow!; Underwater Discovery; Some Kind of Wonderful	"Wonders of the World" (Series 13, Episode 1); "At the Beach" (Series 13, Episode 8); "Animal Friends" (Series 13, Episode 32)	—N/a	
13	Let's Play!	DVD: 9 January 2013	Making Music; Ready or Not; Five Senses	"Making Music" (Series 13, Episode 41); "Games" (Series 13, Episode 36); "Human Body" (Series 13, Episode 26)	—N/a	
13	Feeling Fine	DVD: 6 March 2013	Five Senses; L.O.V.E.; Some Kind of Wonderful	"Food" (Series 13, Episode 27); "Favourite Things" (Series 13, Episode 15); "Friendship" (Series 13, Episode 31)	Hi-5 World Vision visit to Cambodia featurette	
12	Animal Fun	DVD: 19 June 2013	Hi-5 Farm; Martian Groove; Turn the Music Up!	"Jungle Adventure" (Series 12, Episode 3); "In Nature" (Series 12, Episode 12); "Babies - Something New" (Series 12, Episode 44)	—N/a	

== Special releases ==
Series	DVD Title	Release Date (Region 4)	Songs of the Week	Ref.
1	Hi-5 Dance Hits, Volume 1	VHS / DVD: 17 March 2005	L.O.V.E.; You and Me; Dream On; Grow; Ready or Not; Move Your Body; Five Senses; Living in a Rainbow; In a Different Place	
2	Hi-5 Dance Hits, Volume 2	VHS / DVD: 22 September 2005	So Many Animals; North, South, East and West; Feelings; Three Wishes; Feel the Beat; Robot Number One; Mirror, Mirror; Special Days; It's a Party	
3	Hi-5 Dance Hits, Volume 3	DVD: 2 March 2006	Boom Boom Beat; Friends; Opposites Attract; I Can Go Anywhere; Rain Rain; I Spy; Buried Treasure; Let's Get to Work; You're My Number One	
2 – 10	Favourites	DVD: 24 June 2009	Ready or Not (Note: Series 5 version.); So Many Animals; Boom Boom Beat; Celebrate; L.O.V.E.; Going Out; Some Kind of Wonderful; Holiday; Give Five; Action Hero; Are We There Yet?; Party Street; Wow!; Come Alive; Abracadabra	
