= List of Degrassi home video releases =

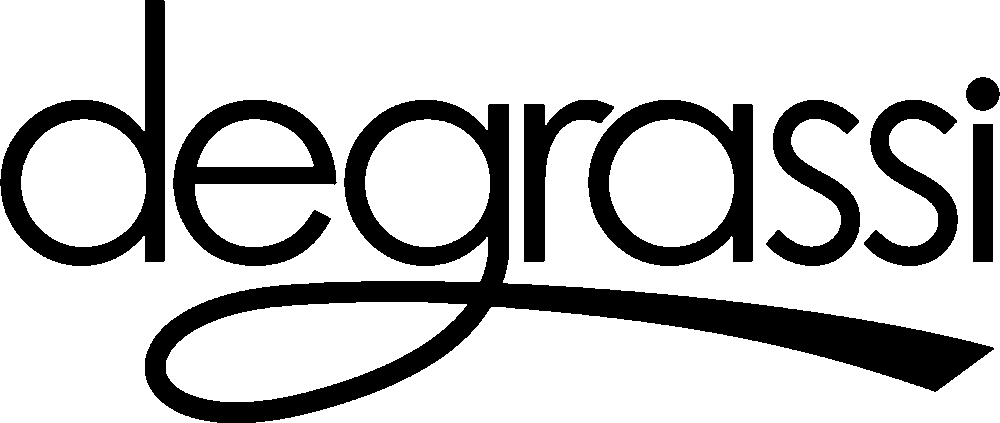

Degrassi is a Canadian teen drama franchise created by Linda Schuyler and Kit Hood in 1979. The franchise spans five main series: The Kids of Degrassi Street, Degrassi Junior High, Degrassi High, Degrassi: The Next Generation, and Degrassi: Next Class, as well as several made-for-television movies, web miniseries and novelizations. Beginning as a series of short films about children who live on or near De Grassi Street in Toronto, Ontario, starting with Degrassi Junior High, the franchise began to focus on an ensemble cast of students attending various schools with the Degrassi name as they confront various issues and challenges. Also starting from Degrassi Junior High, the franchise became a cultural phenomenon in Canada and a cult hit in the United States, garnering critical acclaim for its realistic portrayal of adolescence.

Throughout the years, the franchise (save Next Class) has seen numerous releases to VHS and DVD. In the United States, Degrassi Junior High and Degrassi High were initially distributed in the late 1980s by mail order from Direct Cinema Ltd. for educational use. Large VHS box sets of Degrassi Junior High and Degrassi High were released in 1999 and 2000 by WGBH Boston Home Video, followed by DVD releases in 2005 and 2007, respectively. Degrassi: The Next Generation was distributed on home video in Canada by Alliance Home Entertainment, and in the United States by FUNimation Entertainment and later Echo Bridge Entertainment, with all but it's thirteenth and fourteenth seasons released to DVD.

== The Kids of Degrassi Street ==
=== VHS ===
WGBH releases
Release	Ep #	Release date
"Ida Makes A Movie"/"Cookie Goes To Hospital"/"Irene Moves In"	3	2000
"Lisa Makes The Headlines"/"Noel Buys A Suit"	2	2000
"Ryan Runs For Help"/"Martin Hears The Music"	2	2000
"Billy Breaks The Chain"/"Catherine Finds Her Balance"	2	2000
"Sophie Minds The Store"/"Casey Draws The Line"	2	2000
"Rachel Runs For Office"/"Griff Makes A Date"	2	2000
"Connie Makes The Catch"/"Karen Keeps Her Word"	2	2000
"Pete Takes A Chance"/"Chuck Makes A Choice"	2	2000
"Martin Meets The Pirates"/"Connie Goes To Court"	2	2000
"Lisa Gets Her Picture"/"Griff Gets A Hand"	2	2000

=== DVD ===
Season	Set details	DVD release dates			Special features
Season	Set details	Region 1	Region 2	Region 4	Special features
The Kids Of Degrassi Street: The Complete Series	Discs: 3; Episodes: 26; 1.33:1 aspect ratio	July 31, 2007		March 12, 2008	N/A

== Degrassi Junior High ==
=== VHS ===
Direct Cinema Ltd. releases
Release	Ep #	Release date
Degrassi Junior High: Term 2	13	1988
Degrassi Junior High: Term 3	16	1988

WGBH releases
Release	Ep #	Release date
"Kiss Me Steph"/"The Big Dance"	2	1999
"The Experiment"/"The Cover-Up"	2	1999
"The Great Race"/"Rumor Has It"	2	1999
"The Best Laid Plans"/"Nothing To Fear"	2	2000
"What A Night!"/"Smokescreen"	2	2000
"It's Late"/"Parent's Night"	2	2000
"Revolution/"Eggbert"	2	2000
"A Helping Hand"/"Great Expectations"	2	2000
"Dinner And A Show"/"Stage Fright"	2	2000
"Fight!"/"Bottled Up"	2	2000
"Sealed With A Kiss"/"Dog Days"	2	2000
"Censored"/"Trust Me"	2	2000
"He's Back"/"Pass Tense"	2	2000
"Can't Live With 'Em, Parts 1 & 2"	2	2000
"A Big Girl Now"/"Seasons Greetings"	2	2000
"Loves Me, Loves Me Not"/"He Ain't Heavy"	2	2000
"The Whole Truth"/"Star-Crossed"	2	2000
"Food For Thought"/"Twenty Bucks"	2	2000
"Taking Off, Parts 1 & 2"	2	2000
"Pa-Arty!"/"Bye Bye Junior High"	2	2000
21 Video Set	42	March 7, 2000

=== DVD ===
Season	Set details	DVD release dates			Special features
Season	Set details	Region 1	Region 2	Region 4	Special features
Degrassi Junior High: Season One	Discs: 4; Episodes: 13; 1.33:1 aspect ratio	February 1, 2005	April 30, 2007	2005-2006	Region 1: Degrassi Talks: On Drugs; Degrassi Talks: On Sexuality; Degrassi Talks: On Sex; Trivia; Wallpapers; Printable materials
Degrassi Junior High: Season Two	Discs: 3; Episodes: 13; 1.33:1 aspect ratio	June 7, 2005		2005	Region 1: Degrassi Talks: On Alcohol; Degrassi Talks: On Abuse; Degrassi Talks: On Depression; Trivia; Wallpapers; Printable materials
Degrassi Junior High: Season Three	Discs: 3; Episodes: 16; 1.33:1 aspect ratio	September 27, 2005		2005	Region 1: Degrassi Between Takes; Trivia; Wallpapers; Printable materials
The Complete Collection/Series	Discs: 9 (2005), 6 (2016); Episodes: 42; 1.33:1 aspect ratio	October 25, 2005 October 11, 2016			Special features from individual sets
The Complete Degrassi High (Degrassi High & Degrassi Junior High)	Discs: 13; Episodes: 71; 1.33:1 aspect ratio			November 2, 2016	Degrassi Talks; Degrassi Between Takes; Degrassi: School's Out

=== Streaming ===
In 2019, Encore+, the YouTube channel of Canada Media Fund, made the entirety of Degrassi Junior High available free to view, in both English and French.

== Degrassi High ==
=== VHS ===
Direct Cinema Ltd. releases
Release	Ep #	Release date
Degrassi High: Term 4	13	1990
Degrassi High: Term 5	16	1990

=== DVD ===
Season	Set details	DVD release dates			Special features
Season	Set details	Region 1	Region 2	Region 4	Special features
Degrassi High: The Complete Series	Discs: 4; Episodes: 29; 1.33:1 aspect ratio	October 9, 2007 December 13, 2016			Region 1: Pop Quiz! - Degrassi High trivia; Degrassi High wallpaper; Printable materials for educators; Printable cast interviews
Degrassi High Collection	Discs: 5 (includes School's Out on separate disc); Episodes: 29; 1.33:1 aspect ratio			March 12, 2008	N/A

== School's Out ==
=== VHS ===
Release	Distributor	Release date
School's Out: The Degrassi High Graduation Special	WGBH Boston Home Video (United States)	1992
Degrassi High: School's Out	ABC Video/Roadshow Entertainment (Australia)	1993
Degrassi High: School's Out	WGBH Boston Home Video (United States)	March 7, 2000

=== DVD ===
Release	Distributor	Release date
Degrassi High: School's Out	Force Entertainment (Australia)	July 10, 2006

== Degrassi: The Next Generation ==
Complete Season DVD Release
Release	Ep #	Release dates				Special Features
Release	Ep #	Region 1		Region 2	Region 4	Special Features
Release	Ep #	Canada	United States	Region 2	Region 4	Special Features
Season One	15	October 5, 2004	September 28, 2004	—N/a	May 3, 2007 (ABC DVD) September 8, 2010 (Umbrella Entertainment)	Degrassi Karaoke, Degrassi Photo Album, Character Descriptions, Cast Biographies, Deleted Scenes, Oops and Bloopers, Original Television Promos, and Audition Tapes.
Season Two	22	June 21, 2005		—N/a	September 8, 2010	130+ Deleted/Extended Scenes and Bloopers, Cast Audition Tapes, Season 2 Second Call Back Tapes, "Poor Thing" Karaoke, Interactive Fan Quiz, Degrassi Yearbook, Snake and Spike's Wedding Album, Student and Adult Profiles, and Cast Biographies.: Note: Region 4 DVD Release Only Has 72 Deleted Scenes
Season Three	22	March 28, 2006		—N/a	April 13, 2011	Audio Commentaries ("Accidents Will Happen" and "Pride"), Deleted Scenes, "Rock and Roll High School" Karaoke, Season 3 Interactive Quiz, CTV Degrassi Promo, Degrassi Yearbook, and Character and Cast Biographies.
Season Four	23	October 24, 2006	November 28, 2006	—N/a	April 13, 2011	Audio Commentaries ("Time Stands Still" and "Secret"), Deleted Scenes, Blooper Reel, Original Cast Auditions, Season 4 Interactive Quiz, Character and Cast Biographies, Jay and Silent Bob Flipbook, Degrassi Yearbook, and PAX Gun Violence Prevention Public Service Announcements.: Note: Audio Commentary on "Secret" is only available on the United States release.
Season Five	19	July 3, 2007		—N/a	—N/a	Deleted Scenes, Blooper Reel, Original Cast Auditions, Interview with Cassie Steele, Character and Cast Biographies, Degrassi Yearbook, Simple Plan Music Video and Interview, and Trailers.
Season Six	19	May 27, 2008		—N/a	—N/a	Deleted Scenes, Bloopers, Original Auditions, Character and Cast Biographies, Degrassi Yearbook, and Trailers.
Season Seven	24	May 26, 2009	March 17, 2009	—N/a	—N/a	Bloopers, Deleted Scenes, Photo Gallery, Webisodes, and "On The Set".
Season Eight	23	September 1, 2009		—N/a	—N/a	"Degrassi Goes Hollywood" The Movie, Bloopers, Deleted Scenes, Podcasts, Webisodes, "On The Set" Webisodes, and "My Window" Music Video.
Season Nine	23	July 20, 2010		—N/a	—N/a	"Degrassi Takes Manhattan" The Movie, Bloopers, Deleted Scenes, Webisodes and Minis, and Music Videos.
Season Ten	44	October 18, 2011	September 13, 2011	—N/a	—N/a	Episode Commentaries ("My Body Is A Cage" and "Umbrella"), Music Videos, Bloopers, and Webisodes.
Season Eleven	45	December 3, 2013		—N/a	—N/a	Meet the New Kids, The Gallery Shoot, Set Tour, Parking Lot Tour, From Rehearsal to Shooting, Goodbyes, Behind the Scenes, Deleted Scenes, Bloopers, and Webisodes.
Season Twelve	40	October 29, 2013		—N/a	—N/a	Back to Degrassi, New Kids on the Block, Shooting the Opening Sequence, 300th Episode Celebration, A Day with the Ice Hounds, Goodbye Uniforms, Inside Fiona's Birthday Brawl, Say Cheese: Photoshoot with Demetrius, Vanessa and Justice, The Making of Romeo & Jules, Bloopers, The Inside Look and The Table Read - Bitter Sweet Symphony, Graduation Day, Prom Night, The One and Only - Dylan Everett, Eli's Short Film - LIFE, Eli's Short Film - NYU Portfolio, Video Yearbook, and Episode Commentary.
Season Thirteen	40	—N/a	—N/a	—N/a	—N/a	To Be Announced
Season Fourteen	28	—N/a	—N/a	—N/a	—N/a	To Be Announced

=== Future DVD releases ===
As of 9 July 2026, there have been no future Degrassi home media releases beyond the twelfth season of Next Generation. In 2015, Stephen Stohn stated on Twitter that they had delivered the elements for the season 13 DVD release, but the distributor changed.
