= List of Heartbeat home media releases =

This is a list of media releases of the television series Heartbeat, which includes DVD and VHS.

== DVD release ==
DVDs of the series in the UK are listed below, released by Network DVD. Only series 1–5 have been released so far in Finland. In Australia (Region 4) Series 1–5 have been released both individually and as a box set. Series 6–10 have also been released. Series 11 and 12 were released on 6 November 2013. Some music has been partly changed or removed due to copyright grounds/licensing costs.

== All region releases ==
DVD series	Ep #	Original air date	Region 2 (UK)	Region 2 (Finland)	Region 4 (Aus) (N.Z)
The Complete Series 1	10	1992	27 September 2010	13 November 2009	5 April 2012
The Complete Series 2	10	1993	8 November 2010	19 March 2010	5 April 2012
The Complete Series 3	10	1993	28 February 2011	5 November 2010	3 May 2012
The Complete Series 4	16	1994	27 June 2011	3 December 2010	2 August 2012
The Complete Series 5	15	1995	18 July 2011	16 September 2011	21 November 2012
The Complete Series 6	17	1996	15 August 2011	14 May 2014	6 March 2013
The Complete Series 7	24	1997–1998	26 September 2011	14 May 2014	6 March 2013
The Complete Series 8	24	1998–1999	24 October 2011	21 August 2014	3 April 2013
The Complete Series 9	24	1999–2000	6 February 2012	21 August 2014	5 June 2013
The Complete Series 10	24	2000–2001	26 March 2012	13 November 2014	7 August 2013
The Complete Series 11	24	2001–2002	27 August 2012	13 November 2014	6 November 2013
The Complete Series 12	25	2002–2003	8 October 2012	12 December 2014	6 November 2013
The Complete Series 13	25	2003–2004	26 November 2012	12 December 2014	4 December 2013
The Complete Series 14	26	2004–2005	4 March 2013	24 April 2015	5 March 2014
The Complete Series 15	26	2005–2006	27 May 2013	24 April 2015	2 April 2014
The Complete Series 16	24	2006–2007	29 July 2013	14 August 2015	7 May 2014
The Complete Series 17	24	2007–2008	28 October 2013	14 August 2015	5 November 2014
The Complete Series 18	24	2008–2010	3 February 2014	23 October 2015	3 December 2014

Other DVD boxsets	Ep #	Original air date	Region 2 (UK)	Region 2 (Finland)	Region 4 (Australia)
Series 1 – 2	20	1992–1993	N/A	5 November 2010	N/A
Series 1 – 3	30	1992–1993	N/A	13 November 2014	2 January 2013
Series 1 – 5	61	1992–1995	N/A	N/A	21 November 2012
Series 1 – 7 – The Rowan Years	102	1992–1998	21 October 2013	N/A	N/A
The Complete Series	372	1992–2010	TBA	N/A	5 November 2014
