= List of Murder, She Wrote home video releases =

DVD Releases Of Murder, She Wrote TV Series

Cover art of Murder, She Wrote: The Complete First Season

Universal Studios Home Entertainment has released Murder, She Wrote on DVD. All twelve seasons and four TV movies are available in Regions 1, 2 & 4. The DVDs have also been released in several countries around the world dubbed in their respective languages.

All twelve seasons and four TV movies are available in Regions 1, 2, and 4. The DVDs have also been released in several countries around the world dubbed in their respective languages. All 264 episodes from twelve seasons are included, re-packaged on 63 discs. The TV movies are not included with this set but were released as a separate two-DVD set. The show was remastered in 4K and released on Blu-ray, along with the four TV movies, in 2025.

== Special features ==
The first and second season sets lacked in any special features other than previews of other Universal releases. Seasons three through seven, ten, and eleven have had some sort of bonus included (except for season five in Region 2).

The season three set includes the Magnum, P.I. crossover episode, "Novel Connection", but was originally going to include an episode from season four. The season also includes a documentary about iconic 1980s TV shows called "The Great '80s TV Flashback".

The season four set includes a bonus episode from season five, and the fifth, sixth, and seventh seasons feature exclusive interviews with the cast and crew (the Region 2 release of season five did not include the interview).

The Region 1 release of season six includes "America's Top Sleuths", a documentary about the best American TV sleuths, as well as the interview "Recipe for a Hit". These bonus features were not included on the Region 2 release.

Universal asked fans whether the episode "Amsterdam Kill" should be released with the season ten set since it was produced during the tenth season, or if it should be included with season eleven, when it originally aired. After fans contacted TVShowsOnDVD.com with their views, Universal decided to put the episode on both releases as the results were split. Due to this, the episode was a bonus feature on the season ten DVD and a regular episode on the season eleven release.

The season eleven DVDs includes two bonus episodes from the show's twelfth and final season, "Big Easy Murder" and "Home Care".

In addition to the regular bonus features, most Region 2 releases also have a Universal Playback trailer showcasing classic and cult TV releases from the studio.

== Cover art ==
Region 2 versions of seasons five and six have slightly different cover art from the Region 1 releases, with different pictures replacing the originals. Universal Playback have not given a reason for this, although the season six image may have been changed because the original picture was used on the back of the season one release in both regions.

The Region 4 release of season eleven used the same picture for the front cover art as the one used for season ten.

== Season releases ==
Murder, She Wrote: The Complete First Season
Set Details
Special Features
- Episodes: 22
- Aspect Ratio: 1.33:1
- Number of Discs: 3 (R1) • 6 (R2 & R4)
- Languages: English (Dolby Digital 2.0 Mono)
- Subtitles: English, French, Spanish (R1) • English, Dutch (R2)
- Rating: Not Rated (R1) • Parental Guidance (R2 & R4)
- None
Release Dates
Region 1
Region 2
Region 4
March 29, 2005
August 29, 2005
May 2, 2007

Murder, She Wrote: The Complete Second Season
Set Details
Special Features
- Episodes: 22
- Aspect Ratio: 1.33:1
- Number of Discs: 3 (R1) • 6 (R2 & R4)
- Languages: English (Dolby Digital 2.0 Mono)
- Subtitles: English, Spanish (R1) • None (R2)
- Rating: Not Rated (R1) • Parental Guidance (R2) • Mature (R4)
- None
Release Dates
Region 1
Region 2
Region 4
December 6, 2005
May 1, 2006
August 1, 2007

Murder, She Wrote: The Complete Third Season
Set Details
Special Features
- Episodes: 22
- Aspect Ratio: 1.33:1
- Number of Discs: 3 (R1) • 6 (R2 & R4)
- Languages: English (Dolby Digital 2.0 Mono)
- Subtitles: English (R1) • None (R2)
- Rating: Not Rated (R1) • 12 years and over (R2) • Mature (R4)
- "The Great '80s TV Flashback" – Documentary about iconic 1980s TV shows.
- "Novel Connection" – Bonus crossover episode from Magnum, P.I.
Release Dates
Region 1
Region 2
Region 4
March 14, 2006
July 31, 2006
September 5, 2007

Murder, She Wrote: The Complete Fourth Season
Set Details
Special Features
- Episodes: 22
- Aspect Ratio: 1.33:1
- Number of Discs: 5 (R1) • 6 (R2 & R4)
- Languages: English (Dolby Digital 2.0 Mono)
- Subtitles: English (R1) • None (R2)
- Rating: Not Rated (R1) • 12 years and over (R2) • Mature (R4)
- "Snow White, Blood Red" – Bonus episode from Season Five.
Release Dates
Region 1
Region 2
Region 4
October 17, 2006
March 24, 2007
September 5, 2007

Murder, She Wrote: The Complete Fifth Season
Set Details
Special Features
- Episodes: 22
- Aspect Ratio: 1.33:1
- Number of Discs: 5 (R1) • 6 (R2 & R4)
- Languages: English (Dolby Digital 2.0 Stereo)
- Subtitles: English (R1) • None (R2)
- Rating: Not Rated (R1) • 12 years and over (R2) • Mature (R4)
- "Origin of a Series" – Exclusive interviews with the cast and crew. (R1)
Release Dates
Region 1
Region 2
Region 4
January 30, 2007
July 23, 2007
November 21, 2007

Murder, She Wrote: The Complete Sixth Season
Set Details
Special Features
- Episodes: 22
- Aspect Ratio: 1.33:1
- Number of Discs: 5 (R1) • 6 (R2 & R4)
- Languages: English (Dolby Digital 2.0 Stereo)
- Subtitles: English (R1) • None (R2)
- Rating: Not Rated (R1) • 12 years and over (R2) • Mature (R4)
- "Recipe for a Hit" – Exclusive interviews with the cast and crew.
- "America's Top Sleuths" – Documentary about the best American TV sleuths. (R1)
Release Dates
Region 1
Region 2
Region 4
April 17, 2007
September 10, 2007
November 21, 2007

Murder, She Wrote: The Complete Seventh Season
Set Details
Special Features
- Episodes: 22
- Aspect Ratio: 1.33:1
- Number of Discs: 5 (R1) • 6 (R2 & R4)
- Languages: English (Dolby Digital 2.0 Stereo)
- Subtitles: English (R1) • None (R2)
- Rating: Not Rated (R1) • 12 years and over (R2) • Mature (R4)
- "The Perils of Success" – Exclusive interviews with the cast and crew.
Release Dates
Region 1
Region 2
Region 4
October 9, 2007
March 31, 2008
April 30, 2008

Murder, She Wrote: The Complete Eighth Season
Set Details
Special Features
- Episodes: 22
- Aspect Ratio: 1.33:1
- Number of Discs: 5 (R1) • 6 (R2 & R4)
- Languages: English (Dolby Digital 2.0 Stereo)
- Subtitles: English (R1) • None (R2)
- Rating: Not Rated (R1) • 12 years and over (R2) • Mature (R4)
- None
Release Dates
Region 1
Region 2
Region 4
April 1, 2008
June 16, 2008
July 2, 2008

Murder, She Wrote: The Complete Ninth Season
Set Details
Special Features
- Episodes: 22
- Aspect Ratio: 1.33:1
- Number of Discs: 5
- Languages: English (Dolby Digital 2.0 Stereo)
- Subtitles: English (R1) • None (R2)
- Rating: Not Rated (R1) • 12 years and over (R2) • Mature (R4)
- None
Release Dates
Region 1
Region 2
Region 4
February 17, 2009
April 20, 2009
June 3, 2009

Murder, She Wrote: The Complete Tenth Season
Set Details
Special Features
- Episodes: 21
- Aspect Ratio: 1.33:1
- Number of Discs: 5
- Languages: English (Dolby Digital 2.0 Stereo)
- Subtitles: English (R1) • None (R2)
- Rating: Not Rated (R1) • 12 years and over (R2) • Mature (R4)
- "Amsterdam Kill" – Bonus episode from Season Eleven.
Release Dates
Region 1
Region 2
Region 4
July 7, 2009
August 31, 2009
September 30, 2009

Murder, She Wrote: The Complete Eleventh Season
Set Details
Special Features
- Episodes: 21
- Aspect Ratio: 1.33:1
- Number of Discs: 5 (R1) • 6 (R2 & R4)
- Languages: English (Dolby Digital 2.0 Stereo)
- Subtitles: English (R1) • None (R2)
- Rating: Not Rated (R1) • 12 years and over (R2) • Mature (R4)
- "Big Easy Murder" and "Home Care" – Bonus episodes from Season Twelve.
Release Dates
Region 1
Region 2
Region 4
February 2, 2010
April 26, 2010
May 4, 2010

Murder, She Wrote: The Complete Twelfth Season
Set Details
Special Features
- Episodes: 24
- Aspect Ratio: 1.33:1
- Number of Discs: 5 (R1) • 6 (R2 & R4)
- Languages: English (Dolby Digital 2.0 Stereo)
- Subtitles: English (R1) • None (R2)
- Rating: Not Rated (R1) • Parental Guidance (R2) • Mature (R4)
- None
Release Dates
Region 1
Region 2
Region 4
November 23, 2010
January 31, 2011
March 30, 2011

== TV movies release ==
Murder, She Wrote: 4 Movie Collection
Set Details
Special Features
- Episodes: 4
- Aspect Ratio: 1.33:1 / 1.78:1 (The Celtic Riddle only)
- Number of Discs: 2
- Languages: English (Dolby Digital 2.0 Stereo)
- Subtitles: English (R1) • None (R2)
- Rating: Not Rated (R1) • 12 years and over (R2) • Mature (R4)
- None
Release Dates
Region 1
Region 2
Region 4
February 14, 2012
March 26, 2012
May 2, 2012

== Other releases ==
Murder, She Wrote: Seasons One, Two & Three
Set Details
Special Features
- Episodes: 66
- Aspect Ratio: 1.33:1
- Number of Discs: 18
- Languages: English (Dolby Digital 2.0 Mono)
- Subtitles: English, Dutch (Season One only)
- Rating: 12 years and over (R2)
- "The Great '80s TV Flashback" – Documentary about iconic '80s TV shows.
- "Novel Connection" – Bonus crossover episode from Magnum, P.I.
Release Dates
Region 1
Region 2
Region 4
—N/a
November 20, 2006
—N/a

Murder, She Wrote: Seasons One, Two, Three, Four & Five
Set Details
Special Features
- Episodes: 110
- Aspect Ratio: 1.33:1
- Number of Discs: 30
- Languages: English (Dolby Digital 2.0 Mono)
- Subtitles: English, Dutch (Season One only)
- Rating: 12 years and over (R2)
- "The Great '80s TV Flashback" – Documentary about iconic '80s TV shows.
- "Novel Connection" – Bonus crossover episode from Magnum, P.I.
Release Dates
Region 1
Region 2
Region 4
—N/a
October 22, 2007
—N/a

The Law & Harry McGraw: The Complete Series – The Murder, She Wrote Spin-off Series
Set Details
Special Features
- Episodes: 16
- Aspect Ratio: 1.33:1
- Number of Discs: 5
- Languages: English (Dolby Digital 2.0 Mono)
- Subtitles: None
- Rating: Mature (R4)
- "Tough Guys Don't Die" – Bonus episode from Season One.
- "Death Takes a Dive" – Bonus episode from Season Three.
Release Dates
Region 1
Region 2
Region 4
—N/a
TBA
November 7, 2012

Murder, She Wrote: The Complete Series
Set Details
Special Features
- Episodes: 264
- Aspect Ratio: 1.33:1
- Number of Discs: 63
- Languages: English (Dolby Digital 2.0 Mono/Stereo)
- Subtitles: English
- Rating: Not Rated (R1)
- "The Great '80s TV Flashback" – Documentary about iconic '80s TV shows.
- "Novel Connection" – Bonus crossover episode from Magnum, P.I.
- "Origin of a Series", "Recipe for a Hit" and "The Perils of Success" – Exclusive interviews with the cast and crew.
- "America's Top Sleuths" – Documentary about the best American TV sleuths.
Release Dates
Region 1
Region 2
Region 4
October 1, 2013
July 9, 2018
April 25, 2018

== Blu-ray ==
In France, on November, 12, 2019, Universal Studios worked with the French company Elephant Films to release the first six seasons of Murder She Wrote on Blu-Ray under the title "Arabesque". The set is region free (Region A/B/C) which means it will play on any Blu-ray player in the world. The set has the original English audio version and the French dubbed version. As of July 2025, Elephant Films has not released the subsequent seasons in the series.

The complete remastered series was released on Blu-ray in the United States on June 17, 2025. The set includes all four made-for-TV movies.
