= Give Us a Break (TV series) =

British television series

- Genre: Comedy drama
- Written by: Geoff McQueen
- Starring: Robert Lindsay; Paul McGann; Shirin Taylor
- Composer: Harry South
- Country of origin: United Kingdom
- Original language: English
- No. of series: 1
- No. of episodes: 8

Production
- Producer: Terence Williams
- Running time: 50 minutes (series); 95 minutes (special)
- Production company: BBC

Original release
- Network: BBC One
- Release: 22 September 1983 – 31 December 1984

Give Us a Break is a British comedy drama television series which was originally broadcast on BBC One in a series of seven episodes between 22 September and 3 November 1983 with a feature-length Christmas Special the following year.

== Synopsis ==
A London wheeler dealer is extremely put out at having to look after his girlfriend's younger brother from Liverpool. Things change, however, when he discovers that he is a snooker prodigy.

== Main cast ==
- Robert Lindsay as Micky Noades
- Paul McGann as Mo Morris
- Shirin Taylor as Tina
- David Daker as Ron Palmer
- Ron Pember as Bobby Weeks
- Alan Ford as Nobby Wilson
- David Sibley as Billy Wilson
- Johnny Shannon as Lenny Stone
- Tony Selby as Benny
- Julian Holloway as Dave Nelson
- John Forgeham as Brindly
- William Simons as Tommy Buck
- David Jackson as Stitch Peters
- Bill Wallis as Jack Hobson
- Victoria Burgoyne as Nancy
- Walter Sparrow as Alan Clegg
- Sara Sugarman as Pat

== Bibliography ==
- Perry, Chris. The Kaleidoscope British Christmas Television Guide 1937-2013. 2017.
- Vahimagi, Tise. British Television: An Illustrated Guide. Oxford University Press, 1996.
