= Geoff McQueen =

British television screenwriter (1947–1994)

- Born: Geoffrey McQueen; 24 July 1947; Dalston, London, England
- Died: 6 July 1994 (aged 46); England
- Occupation: Screenwriter
- Spouse(s): Jan Reeve (m. 1967–1994) (his death)
- Writing career
- Period: 1982–94
- Notable work: The Bill (1984–2010)

Geoffrey McQueen (24 July 1947 – 6 July 1994) was a British television screenwriter and creator of the long-running police procedural The Bill. He also wrote the popular comedy-dramas Give Us a Break, Big Deal and Stay Lucky.

Early in his career, he worked as a carpenter and joiner, building British-style pubs around the world. He began writing for television in his early thirties. His first success was in 1982 when an episode of The Gentle Touch he had written was broadcast. He originally conceived of The Bill as a one-off television drama which first aired on August 16, 1983.

He wrote for other shows, including Boon, and two Jim Davidson sitcoms.

== Personal life and death ==
He was married to his wife Jan, and they had two children. His son Greg McQueen is the editor of the book 100 Stories for Haiti.

He died on 6 July 1994, aged 46, from an aneurysm.
