= An Inspector Calls (disambiguation) =

An Inspector Calls is a 1945 play by J. B. Priestley.

An Inspector Calls may also refer to:

- An Inspector Calls (1954 film), directed by Guy Hamilton
- An Inspector Calls (TV series), directed by Michael Simpson
- An Inspector Calls (2015 Hong Kong film), Hong Kong black comedy film directed by Raymond Wong and Herman Yau
- An Inspector Calls (2015 TV film), directed by Aisling Walsh
- "An Inspector Calls" (Mind Your Language), a 1978 television episode
- "An Inspector Calls" (The Brittas Empire), a 1992 television episode

== See also ==
- "An Inspector Called", an episode of Doctors
