= Aled Pugh =

Welsh actor

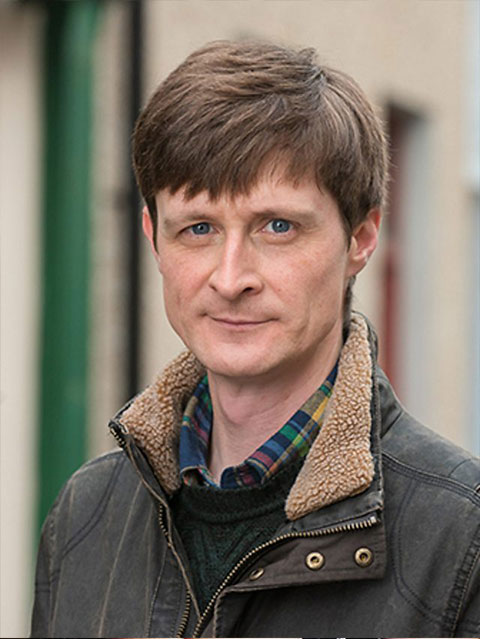
- Pugh in 2020
- Born: Aled Pugh; May 1979 (age 47); Ammanford, Dyfed, Wales
- Education: Ysgol Gyfun Maes yr Yrfa
- Occupation: Actor
- Years active: 1990–present
- Spouse: Emily Kate Evans (m. 2014)
- Children: 2

Aled Pugh (born May 1979) is a Welsh actor who has worked extensively in television roles and movies in both Welsh and English medium. He is best known for playing Bobby Gittins in the Sky One series Stella, and Gerwyn Parri in the long-running Welsh soap Pobol y Cwm.

== Career ==
Pugh first came to prominence in 1990, playing school-child Rhys in the Welsh comedy-drama Hapus Dyrfa. He starred in three series on S4C.

In 2005 Pugh played Ryan Davies in a play about the lives of Welsh comedy double act Ryan and Ronnie. He later took the same role in a screen adaptation, with critical acclaim. He was awarded a BAFTA Cymru award in May 2010 for best actor in this role.

== Personal life ==
Pugh was brought up in Tycroes, near Ammanford by his parents Sian and Hywel Pugh. He later attended Ysgol Gyfun Maes yr Yrfa secondary school.

Pugh lives in Llangynwyd with his wife Emily whom he married in summer 2014. They have two children; Eila (born August 2012) and Efan (born May 2015).

His brother is Welsh rugby player Dylan Pugh who represented Wales at under-21 level.

== Filmography ==
=== Film ===
Year	Film	Role	Notes
2010	Royal Wedding	Robbie	
2011	Hunky Dory	Tim	Musical film
2017	Canaries	Ryan	
2018	Say My Name	Victor	

=== Television ===
Year	Title	Role	Notes
1990–1992	Hapus Dyrfa	Rhys	
2000	The Secret World of Michael Fry	Karl	Main role
20??	Treflan	William Ellis	
2003	My Family	Giles	
2004	Red Cap	Pte. Oliver Teale	1 episode
2007	Primeval	Plumber	1 episode
2007–2009	Y Pris	Bryn Pritchard	Main Role
2009	Ar y Tracs	Gwenci	S4C television film
2009	Ryan a Ronnie	Ryan Davies	S4C TV film
2009	Caerdydd	Dai Rees	
2011	Tri Diwrnod Diwetha'	Man on phone	Short film
2011–2012	Alys	Kevin	Main role
2011	Ar y Tracs - Y Trên i'r Gêm	Gwenci	S4C sequel film
2012–2017	Stella	Bobby Gittins	Main role; 6 series
2014–2015	Gwaith/Cartref	Dewi Pritchard	Series 4–5
2016	Ordinary Lies	Lenny	Series 2
2016	Hinterland	Paul Webb	
2018	Tourist Trap	Darren	
2018–2022	Pobol y Cwm	Gerwyn Parri	Series regular
2022	The Light in the Hall	Ian	Co-production with S4C and Channel 4
2025	The One That Got Away	DS Celyn Howells	

== Awards and nominations ==
Year	Award	Category	Result	Refs
2010	BAFTA Cymru	Best actor	Won	
