= Pramface =

Television series

- The opening title sequence of Pramface
- Genre: Sitcom
- Created by: Chris Reddy
- Written by: Chris Reddy
- Directed by: Dan Zeff (Series 1); Misha Manson-Smith (Series 2); Ben Gosling-Fuller (Series 2); Natalie Bailey (Series 3)
- Starring: Scarlett Alice Johnson; Sean Michael Verey
- Country of origin: United Kingdom
- Original language: English
- No. of series: 3
- No. of episodes: 19

Production
- Producer: Lucy Robinson
- Production locations: Edinburgh, Scotland
- Running time: 30 mins; 60 mins (The Edge of Hell)
- Production company: Little Comet

Original release
- Network: BBC Three
- Release: 23 February 2012 – 25 March 2014

Pramface is a British sitcom starring Scarlett Alice Johnson and Sean Michael Verey. Written by Chris Reddy, the first series, comprising six half-hour episodes, piloted on 23 February 2012. The second series, which was commissioned by the BBC before the first series had even aired, began transmission on 8 January 2013 with an hour-long special as the first episode. The remaining six episodes of the series were of the usual half-hour length. A third series was commissioned which began airing on 25 February 2014 with the double episode series finale, which aired on 25 March 2014, bringing the third series to a total of six half-hour episodes. It was confirmed in August 2014 that a fourth series would not be commissioned.

== Plot ==
Best friends Jamie, Mike, and Beth finish their GCSE exams and head towards a sixth form party. Meanwhile, 18-year-old Laura, encouraged by her best friend Danielle, breaks her parents' curfew and heads to the same party; both Jamie and Laura are determined to have a good time. During the party they meet and drunkenly have sex. The next morning Jamie writes Laura a note with his phone number on it and leaves. Some few weeks later, Laura discovers that she is pregnant, and that Jamie is only 16. Life is about to begin, but not in the way either of them expected.

Series 1 follows the life of the two teenagers and their family and friends as they try to get to grips with the impending parenthood and the struggles of pregnancy. Series 2 follows the next stage, caring for the newly born baby, Emily, while Laura faces the difficulties associated with being a new mother. Series 3 follows Jamie encountering a new woman in his life and how that affects his relationship with the mother of his child.

== Production ==
=== Filming ===
The show was filmed in and around Edinburgh, Scotland, with specific locations including amongst others The Grange suburb and the Corstorphine parish church.

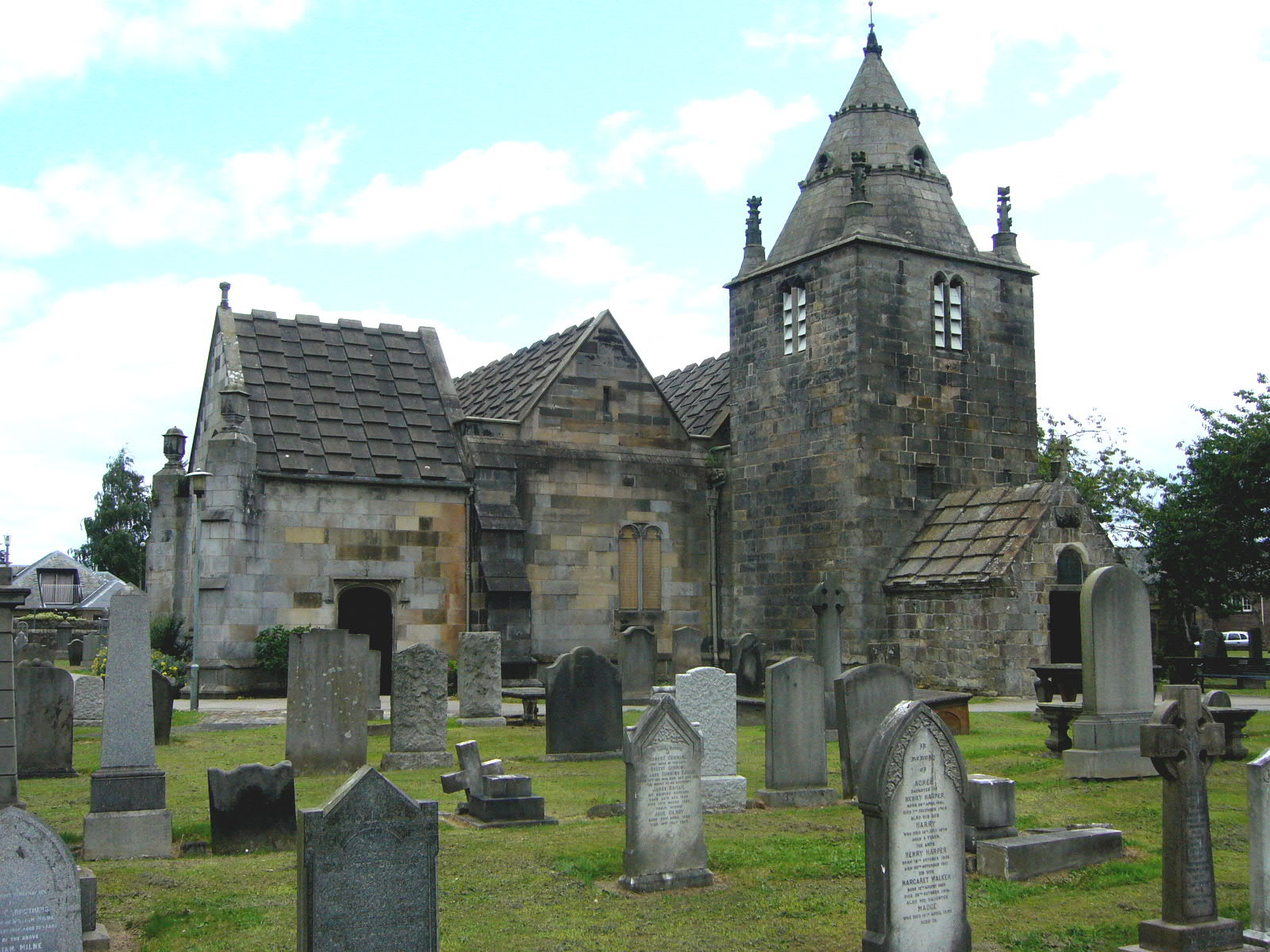
The Corstorphine Old Parish Church in Edinburgh which featured extensively in the episode "The Edge of Hell"

== Cast ==
- Scarlett Alice Johnson as Laura Derbyshire
- Sean Michael Verey as Jamie Prince
- Dylan Edwards as Mike Fenton
- Yasmin Paige as Beth Mitchell
- Emer Kenny as Danielle Reeves
- Ben Crompton as Keith Prince
- Bronagh Gallagher as Sandra Prince
- Angus Deayton as Alan Derbyshire
- Anna Chancellor as Janet Derbyshire

== Series overview ==
Series	Episodes	Originally released		DVD release date
Series	Episodes	First released	Last released	DVD release date
1	6	23 February 2012	29 March 2012	18 February 2013
2	7	8 January 2013	19 February 2013	TBA
3	6	25 February 2014	25 March 2014	TBA

== Episodes ==
=== Series 1 (2012) ===
No. overall	No. in series	Title	Directed by	Written by	Original release date	Viewers
1	1	"Like Narnia But Sexy"	Dan Zeff	Chris Reddy	23 February 2012	470,000
As far as Jamie and his best mate Mike are concerned, their carefree summer is off to a great start. Exams are over and they're on mission to crash the sixth form party and get laid. Across town, 18-year-old Laura, encouraged by her best friend Danielle, breaks her parents' curfew and heads off to the same party, determined to have fun. Life is about to begin, but not in the way either of them expected.
2	2	"Pregnant Rapist"	Dan Zeff	Chris Reddy	1 March 2012	580,000
Laura is in shock, having discovered that Jamie is only 16 years old, and refuses to speak to him. Jamie feels that Laura is not taking him seriously and decides the only way to get her attention is to propose. Meanwhile, Janet and Alan are in counselling, trying to repair their marriage, but their guidance counsellor Jeremy (Karl Theobald) doesn't really seem up to the job.
3	3	"Edinburgh... in Scotland"	Dan Zeff	Chris Reddy	8 March 2012	510,000
Laura is no closer to making a decision on whether to have the baby, but heads off to university anyway. When Jamie finds out she has gone without telling him, he is furious and decides to follow her to Edinburgh... but he's definitely not stalking her. Meanwhile, Beth realises if she wants any chance of getting together with Jamie she's going to have to make her move now.
4	4	"Man of the Moment"	Dan Zeff	Chris Reddy	15 March 2012	400,000
Laura arranges a dinner party that nobody really wants to attend, especially Keith who is suffering after a big night out. Meanwhile, Beth, in an effort to get over Jamie, embarks on a double date. But she needs a wing man and unfortunately Mike is the only person available. At the awkward dinner party, Alan and a tipsy Sandra get on surprisingly well, much to Janet's irritation. However negotiations about the baby don't go well. Jamie and Laura fall out and Janet and Alan wind up having a blazing row.
5	5	"Knocked Up and Homeless"	Dan Zeff	Chris Reddy	22 March 2012	370,000
With three months to go, Laura is still living at Jamie's house and the pressure is starting to show. Keith is sick of being locked out of the bathroom all the time. Jamie is exhausted trying to hold down a job while sleeping on the living room sofa. And, despite the benefits of Laura's obsessive cleaning, even Sandra is starting to wonder when she will actually leave. Meanwhile, Alan and Janet have decided to make a go of their marriage.
6	6	"Aaargh"	Dan Zeff	Chris Reddy	29 March 2012	440,000
At eight and half months, Laura is in the final stages of pregnancy. She's also stuck at home and really bored. With Laura's parents lost in their rekindled love, and best friend Danielle otherwise engaged, Laura gets Jamie to take her on a shopping trip. What could possibly go wrong? Meanwhile Mike has decided to get a professional in to help him lose his virginity. He's raising money for a prostitute by pretending, or so he thinks, to do a fun run. Beth has innocently been helping with the fundraising, but when she discovers where the money is actually going, she's furious. And Keith is taking Sandra on a trip to the Lakes, hoping the beautiful landscape will soften the blow when he breaks the news to her that he's packed in his job.

=== Series 2 (2013) ===
No. overall	No. in series	Title	Directed by	Written by	Original release date	Viewers
7	1	"The Edge of Hell"	Misha Manson-Smith	Chris Reddy	8 January 2013	754,000
Laura and Jamie are struggling to cope with the everyday challenges of raising their baby, so the last thing they need is a big family event. But the Christening is looming and they're nowhere near ready for it. Keith, under pressure from Sandra, is forced to take temping work at the toy shop to help pay for the Christening. But Keith finds it hard to cope when he discovers his new supervisor is his son. Alan is still recovering from his head injury, and Janet wants to go back to work, although she's not mentioning this to Alan. As the visiting relatives arrive, squabble and then criticise, Jamie and Laura are really feeling the pressure – and they haven't even managed to agree on a name yet.
8	2	"Stay at Home Losers"	Misha Manson-Smith	Chris Reddy	15 January 2013	550,000
Beth is confused when she finds herself attracted to a posh boy with views politically opposed to her own. In the absence of real girl friends, she is forced to turn to Jamie and Mike for guidance. Laura is attempting to widen her circle of friends, but she finds it hard to find a peer group – the pramface mums in the park are more interested in nicking her phone, and the competitive yummy mummies just want to patronise and score points off her. Meanwhile, a lonely Alan employs Keith, to be his driver.
9	3	"Supermum and Hardguy2000"	Misha Manson-Smith	Tom Edge	22 January 2013	550,000
Laura has a work placement so, with Janet out at work and Alan too clumsy to be safely left with a baby, she takes up Jamie's offer to babysit. When Jamie finds out he has an exam on the same day but doesn't want to let Laura think he's shirking his responsibility, he is forced to leave Emily with his last resort babysitters, Mike and Beth. Sandra, sick of Keith's increasing employment torpor, pushes him into getting a job.
10	4	"Just Two People with a Kid"	Ben Gosling Fuller	Dan Gaster; Colin Swash	29 January 2013	684,000
Jamie is turning 18 and Mike has taken over organising the party. His main mission is to source some high-quality mind-altering substances. Mike decides to go organic and get hold of some mushrooms. Beth comes on the hunt and steers him towards a harmless non-psychedelic type. Meanwhile, Keith has been forced to take a new-age influenced 'back to work' course. He goes on an accelerated journey of self-discovery. He's getting fitter, and closer to the eternal truths of the universe but he's no closer to getting a job.
11	5	"If You Cry, I'll Cry"	Ben Gosling Fuller	Chris Reddy	5 February 2013	680,000
When Laura learns that Jamie has a date, she goes out of her way to get one herself. She wants to show him that if he's over her, she can move on too. She arranges an internet date with Marcus, a proper, grown-up man with a flat and a job. But, on Danielle's advice, she chooses not to tell him about being a mother for the time being. Mike is on a body-transforming course combining high-strength Russian muscle steroids with a kettlebell workout. But the side effects are taking their toll on his waistline and his emotional state. Keith is approached by a model agent offering work for Emily. He and Sandra enter the world of baby modelling, but soon find out it's more competitive, catty and aggressive than they imagined.
12	6	"Grumpy and Target Boy"	Ben Gosling Fuller	Chris Reddy	12 February 2013	774,000
Danielle encourages Laura to come to a university ball in Edinburgh. But when she arrives Danielle introduces her to her new friend, Francesca, who seems intent on undermining Laura so she can have Danielle to herself. Jamie is depressed – convinced he's blown it with Laura, failing at school and miserable in his job. Mike is so worried about his mate that, when Jamie goes missing, Mike thinks he may be about to kill himself. Keith, too, is at a low ebb in his self-esteem. He even suspects Sandra of cheating with her boss and decides to confront him man to man.
13	7	"Optimum Conditions"	Ben Gosling Fuller	Chris Reddy	19 February 2013	580,000
The future is still uncertain for Jamie and Laura, who are now officially a couple, but Jamie is concerned that Laura's not really into him as she won't 'go public' with the news and tell her parents. Mike is throwing a party to celebrate the end of exams, but finds himself instead drinking away his sorrows with Beth, who is at an all time low and is questioning her status as the 'smart one' after discovering she got a B in one of her exams. Alan and Janet hit the rocks when she is too busy with work to turn up to a counselling session, and he later ends their marriage after Janet reveals she is going on a six-month work placement to New York.

=== Series 3 (2014) ===
No. overall	No. in series	Title	Directed by	Written by	Original release date	Viewers
14	1	"I'm Excited Too!"	Natalie Bailey	Dan Zeff	25 February 2014	N/A
Jamie and Laura are finally a couple, but Laura is already having commitment issues. She is also caught in the crossfire of her parents' impending divorce. Janet is still in New York and Alan has put the family home up for sale. Jamie is having domestic problems too – Sandra and Keith have fallen behind with their mortgage payments and are being evicted. When they are forced to move into a static caravan park, Jamie decides to drop out of school and get a job to provide for his family. Mike and Beth are acting awkwardly with each other after their night together. Mike wants to 'hook up' again and is desperate to tell Jamie he's finally lost his virginity, but a mortified Beth wishes it had never happened and swears Mike to secrecy.
15	2	"Tinker, Tiger, Lobster"	Natalie Bailey	Colin Swash; Dan Gaster	4 March 2014	N/A
Laura is finding living with her dad Alan intolerable. The bachelor pad is completely unsuitable for a baby and Alan has started dating Penny, a girl Laura's age. Jamie, finding it hard to get a job, takes casual work as a painter and decorator, but is horrified to discover he is being pimped out by his boss as eye candy for middle-aged women. Keith, after successfully selling off some old furniture, buys a chest freezer of frozen lobsters to sell, but his new entrepreneurial venture turns out to be tougher than he thought.
16	3	"Proper Little Family"	Natalie Bailey	Chris Reddy	11 March 2014	N/A
Jamie and Laura start flat hunting, but Laura finds fault with every property. Their estate agent Isabel, who has taken a liking to Jamie, quickly realises that their relationship is rocky and sees an opportunity to split them up. Mike gets a job when a cute girl, Lorraine, recruits him to run her father's sports shop. Beth is convinced something fishy is going on and discovers that the business is a front for smuggling cartons of Chinese cigarettes. Mike is in it up to his neck, but he can't walk away as Lorraine's father will kill him. Luckily, Beth has a plan. Sandra runs into Hester, the campsite snob who is holidaying at the caravan park. Too proud to reveal she is actually a permanent resident, Sandra lies and says she's on holiday too, a pretence that is hard to keep up when Hester invites Sandra and Keith to a barbecue.
17	4	"Ignore the Monkey"	Natalie Bailey	Chris Reddy	18 March 2014	N/A
Jamie has been seeing Isabel for a few weeks and is enjoying having some carefree fun for once. Laura is hurt and shocked to discover he's in a new relationship and can't believe Jamie has been so easily manipulated. However, Jamie doesn't see it that way and is happy to finally be in a relationship with a girl who is not blowing hot and cold all the time. Laura, after confronting both Isabel and Jamie, realises she may have finally lost him. Danielle is in a dilemma about dating her tutor, only sleeping with him to get good grades; she later on dumps him. Beth finds it hard to shake off a lesbian admirer, Poppy. Worried that she has led Poppy on and too PC to rebuff her directly, Beth consults Mike on the best way to alienate women – after all, he's an expert. Mike coaches Beth, Cyrano de Bergerac-style, on how to get dumped.
18	5	"Enchanted Picnic"	Natalie Bailey	Chris Reddy	25 March 2014	N/A
Jamie is still dating Isabel, but is starting to find her clingy and juvenile, throwing a tantrum when he criticizes her fairy tale themed 'enchanted picnic'. She persuades Jamie to bring Mike on a double date with the attractive Nicola but Mike is more preoccupied with Beth who, having fallen for hunky fund raiser Ben, is collecting money for a refuge purely to impress him. At a slave auction Beth is appalled to find that the fund raising is based on sex appeal but Mike saves her from humiliation. Laura is adjusting to finally living on her own with Emily, but her domestic idyll is interrupted by the rude arrival of Janet who has come back to contest the divorce settlement, with Laura finding Janet an even more annoying flat-mate than Alan. Janet is hoping to reach a conciliatory settlement, but is outgunned by Alan's glamorous and ruthless lawyer, Sally. Janet sees a glimmer of hope in Alan's apparent generosity, until she realises that he's clearly sleeping with Sally.
19	6	"Kiss for the Camera"	Natalie Bailey	Chris Reddy	25 March 2014	N/A
Laura is trying to move on with her life, applying for university courses and planning for Emily's first birthday. But Janet, depressed about the divorce, is really dragging down the party mood. Alan is still dating his divorce lawyer Sally, who has invited him to meet her teenage son Luke, who explains that Alan is but one of many men she has dated to help with Luke's bad behavior and Alan makes a swift exit. Jamie has realised he can't string Isabel along anymore and tries to find a way to end their relationship, but she's not taking no for an answer. Sandra's sister Evelyn arrives at the caravan park to offer money if Keith will leave his job and look for a house. Sandra sees it as a way to get out of the caravan site, but it soon becomes clear that Evelyn will be attaching conditions to her generosity, all of which involve sticking it to Keith. The Princes are initially tempted until Keith finds out the lucrative practice of disposing of the corpses of elderly residents who have died of hypothermia. At the birthday party Beth and Mike announce that they are a couple, Alan and Janet find that perhaps they should put their divorce on hold and Laura and Jamie realize that there is still a spark between them.

== International broadcast ==
- Australia – Season 1 premiered in Australia on 3 January 2013 on ABC2.
- Netherlands – All three seasons have been picked up by Netflix in the Netherlands.
- United States – All three seasons of the show have been picked up by Hulu in the United States.

== Online ==
In addition to episode preview clips and character information on the BBC website, the writer and stars wrote blog posts about making the show for the BBC TV Blog and BBC Three Blog. An official Facebook page was set up for fans although this has since been closed and one of the main characters, Mike Fenton, was given his own Twitter account where he commented in-character on the events of the episodes as well as other things going on in the real world at the time.
