= Bernard Hepton =

British actor and director (1925–2018)

- Hepton (right) in Emma (1996)
- Born: Francis Bernard Heptonstall; 19 October 1925; Bradford, West Riding of Yorkshire, England
- Died: 27 July 2018 (aged 92); Martin Mill, Dover, Kent, England
- Education: Bradford Civic Playhouse
- Occupations: Actor, director
- Spouses: Nancie Jackson (m. 1957; died 1977) Hillary Liddell (m. 1979; died 2013)

Bernard Hepton (19 October 1925 – 27 July 2018) was a British actor and theatre director. He is known for his stage work and television roles in teleplays and series. He also appeared briefly on radio and in film.

== Early life and education ==
Hepton was born as Francis Bernard Heptonstall, the second of four children, in Bradford, West Riding of Yorkshire. His father, Bernard senior, was an electrician, while his mother Hilda (née Berrington) was from a mill-working family. Brought up as a Catholic, he attended St Bede's Grammar School. His short-sight meant he was unable to serve in the British Army during the Second World War. He trained as an aircraft engineer and draughtsman while undertaking firewatching duties.

== Theatre ==
Hepton trained at the Bradford Civic Playhouse under director Esme Church. He had extensive stage experience as an actor in repertory, especially in Scarborough and York. In 1952, he joined Birmingham Rep under Barry Jackson, later himself becoming the theatre's artistic director in 1957. For a brief period from 1963, he was director of the Liverpool Playhouse, but resigned during his first season. Productions of the Max Frisch play The Fire Raisers and John Osborne's Luther featured in his effort to move the theatre's repertoire beyond its standard fare. He was responsible for arranging the fight sequences in Laurence Olivier's film version of Richard III (1955) and an Old Vic production of Hamlet with Richard Burton in 1953.

== Television ==
Hepton made his television debut as Sir Thomas More in Robert Bolt’s A Man for All Seasons in a live broadcast in 1957. Hepton played Caiaphas in the 1969 Dennis Potter play Son of Man. He was cast as the Kommandant in Colditz (1972–74) and later appeared for the same production team as Albert Foiret in three series of Secret Army (1977–79). Before that he made a guest appearance in an episode of the first series of Catweazle (1970) where he played a naturalist. Other notable performances included Thomas Cranmer in both The Six Wives of Henry VIII (1970) and Elizabeth R (1971). He reprised the role in the film adaptation of the former, Henry VIII and His Six Wives (1972). Hepton acted in adaptations of John le Carré's novels, as Toby Esterhase in the BBC Television versions of Tinker, Tailor, Soldier, Spy and Smiley's People, and George Smiley in the radio adaptations. He appeared in I, Claudius (1976) as Pallas and in the comedy series The Squirrels (1974–77).

Between 1977 and 1979 he played Albert Foiret, proprietor of the Cafe Candide in Secret Army. This role was later parodied as René in 'Allo, 'Allo.

Having played Inspector Goole in An Inspector Calls (1982) and Sir Thomas Bertram in Mansfield Park (1983), Hepton appeared as Sam Toovey in the 1989 television adaptation of Susan Hill's ghost story The Woman in Black (1989). In 1996 he appeared in the television adaptation of Jane Austen's Emma, as the title character's hypochondriac father, Mr Woodhouse. In 1987 he appeared in the television programme The Charmer, in which he played Donald Stimpson

== Radio and film ==
On radio, Hepton played the role of Albert, in Stranger in the Home by Alan Dapre, also the role of The Old Man in the Corner, the amateur and mostly sedentary, sleuth in the BBC Radio 4 dramatic adaption called The Teahouse Detective (1998–2000) by Baroness Orczy. He also starred in Robert Barr's quirky detective radio series "Galbraith" as Inspector Bill Galbraith on BBC radio and as Dr Soppoth in Peter Tinniswood radio monologue "The Governor's Consort" starring Mary Wimbush. On October 2, 1982, Hepton played Malvolio to Harriet Walter's Olivia in a BBC Radio 4 production of Shakespeare's Twelfth Night for Saturday Night Theatre. On April 25, 1993, Hepton played Montague in a BBC R3 production of Romeo and Juliet directed by Kenneth Branagh.

Hepton's appearances in feature films were less frequent. He made his debut in 1949. He made a brief appearance as Thorpey, a gangster, in the classic British crime thriller Get Carter (1971) and another small role, as Milton Goldsmith, in Voyage of the Damned (1976).

== Personal life and death ==
Hepton was said, by his friends, to be "very private" and seldom spoke of his acting career. Hepton married actress Nancie Oldfield Jackson in 1957. Jackson played Thomas More’s wife Alice opposite Hepton as More in the 1957 television film A Man for All Seasons; Hepton and she settled in Barnes, London. Jackson died on 18 January 1977. Hepton married the actress Hilary Joyce Liddell in 1979; he was widowed for a second time when Liddell died on 4 April 2013. Hepton died on 27 July 2018, aged 92, in Martin Mill, Dover, Kent. In his will he left behind a substantial donation to an actors' cafe. He was succeeded by a nephew and a great niece.

== Filmography ==
=== Film credits ===
- A Boy, a Girl and a Bike (1949) as Cyclist (uncredited)
- Richard III (1955) as Soldier, uncredited and credited as Master of Horse
- Get Carter (1971) as Thorpe
- Henry VIII and His Six Wives (1972) as Archbishop Thomas Cranmer
- Barry Lyndon (1975) as Man selling painting to Barry
- Voyage of the Damned (1976) as Milton Goldsmith
- The Plague Dogs (1982) as Stephen Powell (voice)
- Gandhi (1982) as G.O.C, British army in India
- The Holcroft Covenant (1985) as Commander Leighton
- Shadey (1985) as Captain Amies
- Stealing Heaven (1988) as Bishop
- Eminent Domain (1990) as Slovak
- The Baroness and the Pig (2002) as Soames

=== Television credits ===
- A Man for All Seasons (1957) as Sir Thomas More
- The Life of Henry V (1957) as Chorus
- Compact (1964) - director, two episodes
- Swizzlewick (1964) - producer, 20 episodes
- Thursday Theatre (1965) - producer, two episodes
- United! (1965–1966) - producer, 28 episodes
- Play of the Month: The Devil's Eggshell (1966) as Lord Portmanteau
- Great Expectations (1967) as Wemmick
- The Spanish Farm (1968) as Captain Dormer
- Out of the Unknown: The Fosters (1969) as Harry Gerwyn
- The Wednesday Play: Son of Man (1969) as Caiaphas
- The Gold Robbers (1969) as Harold Oscroft
- The Elusive Pimpernel (1969) as Chauvelin
- W. Somerset Maugham: Lord Mountdrago (1969) as Dr Audlin
- Play For Today: Robin Redbreast (1970) as Fisher
- The Six Wives of Henry VIII (1970, in four episodes) as Archbishop Thomas Cranmer
- Elizabeth R (1971) as Archbishop Thomas Cranmer
- Omnibus: Paradise Restored (1971) as Oliver Cromwell
- The Organization (1972) as Rodney Spurling
- Follow the Yellow Brick Road (1972) as Colin Sands
- Colditz (1972–1974) as Kommandant
- Play of the Month: The Adventures of Don Quixote (1973) as Village Priest
- A Pin to See the Peepshow (1973) as Herbert Starling
- Some Mothers Do 'Ave 'Em (1973) as Webster
- The Squirrels (1974–1977) as Mr Fletcher
- Sadie, It's Cold Outside (1975) as Norman Potter
- Orde Wingate (1976) as Palmer
- I, Claudius (1976) as Pallas
- Secret Army (1977–1979) as Albert Foiret
- Tinker Tailor Soldier Spy (1979) as Toby Esterhase
- Blood Money (1981) as Det Chief Supt Meadows
- Kessler (1981) as Albert Foiret
- An Inspector Calls (1982) as Inspector Goole
- Smiley's People (1982) as Toby Esterhase
- Mansfield Park (1983) as Sir Thomas Bertram
- Dear Box Number (1983) as Walter Cartwright
- Cockles (1984) as Sergeant Naughton
- A Profile of Arthur J. Mason (1984) as Arthur J. Mason
- Bleak House (1985) as Krook
- Bergerac (1985) as Sir Geoffrey Newton
- Honour, Profit and Pleasure (1985) as Bishop of London
- The Disputation (1986) as Raymund de Penjaforte
- The Life and Loves of a She-Devil (1986) as Judge Bissop
- The Lady's Not for Burning (1987) as Hebble Tyson
- The Charmer (1987) as Donald Stimpson
- The Contract (1988) as Henry Carter
- The Woman in Black (1989) as Sam Toovey
- A Perfect Hero (1991) as Arthur Fleming
- The Old Devils (1992) as Malcolm Cellan-Davies
- Dandelion Dead (1994) as Mr Davies
- Emma (1996) as Mr Woodhouse
- Midsomer Murders: Death of a Hollow Man (1998) as Harold Winstanley
- Heartbeat: Bread & Circuses (2002) as Colonel Barber/James Barker
