= Frazer Lee =

Frazer Lee is a British screenwriter, filmmaker, and novelist.

== Career ==
Lee's film directing credits include On Edge (1999), Red Lines (2002), and The Stay (2015). In 2007 he was shortlisted as one of the top 12 UK directors in MySpace.com's Movie Mash-up contest by a panel including representatives from 20th Century Fox, Vertigo Films and Film Four. He was awarded the Edgar Allan Poe Gothic Filmmaker Award in 2018 for The Stay.

His screenplay credits include Simone (2010) and Panic Button, which had its market premiere at Cannes Film Festival and its public premiere at London FrightFest Film Festival after festival director Alan Jones placed it at number one in his 'Top 5 must-see gems' for 2011.

Frazer Lee's novel The Lamplighters was a Bram Stoker Award for Best First Novel Finalist in 2011. His other published works include Panic Button: The Official Movie Novelization (2011), Hearthstone Cottage (2019), Greyfriars Reformatory (2020), and the "Daniel Gates Adventures" series of novellas (2013-2018).

== Biography ==
Frazer Lee was born in Rochford, South East Essex and formed his first production company, Robber Baron Productions, in 1998. His guest speaking engagements have included The London Screenwriters Festival and The Guerilla Filmmakers Masterclass. He is Head of Creative Writing at Brunel University London, where he was awarded a PhD. He resides in Buckinghamshire, UK with his family.

== Film ==
| Year | Title | Director | Writer | Producer | Notes |
|---|---|---|---|---|---|
| 1998 | On Edge | Yes | Yes | No | Short film |
| 2002 | Red Lines | Yes | Yes | Yes | Short film |
| 2010 | Simone | No | Yes | No | Short film |
| 2011 | Panic Button | No | Yes | No | Co-written with Chris Crow, John Shackelton, and David Shillitoe |
| 2015 | The Stay | Yes | Yes | Yes | Short film |

== Novels ==
- The Lamplighters, Samhain Publishing, 2011
- Panic Button: The Official Movie Novelization, All2gethr Industries, 2011
- The Jack in the Green, Samhain Publishing, 2013
- The Skintaker, Samhain Publishing, 2015
- Hearthstone Cottage, Flame Tree Press, 2019
- Greyfriars Reformatory, Flame Tree Press, 2020
- Damnation: The Gothic Game, Blackletter Games, 2022

== Novellas ==
=== The Daniel Gates Adventures ===
- The Lucifer Glass, Samhain Publishing, 2013
- The Leper Window, Samhain Publishing, 2015
- The Lilyth Mirror, Crossroad Press, 2018
- The Lucifer Gate, Crossroad Press, 2018

== Short fiction ==
- Ill Met By Moonlight (published in Lighthouse Magazine Issue 2, Dec 2003)
- Pendragon Rising (published in Maelstrom, Calvin House 2004)
- Urbane (published in Lunar Harvest, paperback, Calvin House 2005 & Read By Dawn Vol. 2, Bloody Books 2007)
- Conspiracy of Silence (published in Nocturne 5, Calvin House 2006)
- Tinsel (published in Read By Dawn Vol. 3, Bloody Books 2008)
- Hair of the Dog (published in Urbane and Other Horror Tales, 2009)
- The Minus Touch (published in Urbane and Other Horror Tales, 2009)
- Half/Life (published in Urbane and Other Horror Tales, 2009)
- To Take the Water Down and Go to Sleep (published in The Beauty of Death Volume 2, Independent Legions 2017 & Shadows on the Water, Flame Tree Publishing 2024)
- Sixpack And The Angel (published in The Sixth BHF Book of Horror Stories, BHF Books 2021)
- So Much To See (published in The Seventh BHF Book of Horror Stories, BHF Books 2021)
- Planet of the Dead (published in The Unofficial Blake's 7 Annual, Cult Edge 2023)
- Tumulus (published in Hiding Under The Leaves, The Slab Press 2025)
- Eternity Room (published in Captain Creepy’s Tome of Terror #3, 2025)
- Inglenook (published in Periphery: The Horror of Landscape and Place, Warped Perspective 2026)

== Audio Stories ==
- Doctor Who Interludes: Gobbledegook (Big Finish 2023)

== Short Fiction Collections ==
- Urbane and Other Horror Tales (ebook & paperback, Create Space 2009)
- Ill Met By Moonlight (chapbook, Ghost Writer Publications 2009)

== Edited Anthologies ==
- Faeries, Fiends & Flying Saucers (ebook & paperback, Brunel University London 2017)
- Wizards, Werewolves & Weird Engines (ebook & paperback, Brunel University London 2018)
- Robots, Rogues & Revenants (ebook & paperback, Brunel University London 2020)
- Myths, Monsters & Mayhem (ebook & paperback, Brunel University London 2021)

== Poetry ==
- Some Velvet Mourning published in Horror Writers Association Poetry Showcase Volume V (ebook & paperback, Horror Writers Association 2018)

== Non-fiction ==
- "Not everything that moves, breathes and talks is alive": Christianity, Korean Shamanism and Reincarnation in Whispering Corridors (1998) and The Wailing (2016) – published in Scared Sacred: Idolatry, Religion and Worship in the Horror Film, editors: Rebecca Booth, Erin Thompson, R.F. Todd (House of Leaves Publishing, 2020)
- Koji Suzuki's Ring: A world literary perspective – published in Horror Literature From Gothic to Postmodern: Critical Essays. Editors Nicholas Diak, Michele Brittany (McFarland Publishing, 2020)
- "Rewriting the landscape" – published in Hellebore #12: The Storytelling Issue. Editor: Maria J. Pérez Cuervo (2024)

== Recognition ==
- Finalist, Bram Stoker Award for Best First Novel, (The Lamplighters) 2011

== Other awards and nominations ==
- Runner up, Geoffrey Ashe Prize, (Pendragon Rising) Library of Avalon UK 1998
- Highly Commended (On Edge) Fantastic Films Manchester UK 2000
- Best Short Film (On Edge) Halloween Filmfest Germany 2001
- Best Short Film (On Edge) (3rd) AKA Shriekfest, Los Angeles USA 2003
- Highly Commended (Red Lines) Fantastic Films Manchester UK 2003
- Best Short (Red Lines) Fearless Tales, San Francisco USA 2004
- Best Horror Short, 1st Place (On Edge) Dragon*Con Film Festival, Atlanta USA 2009
- Semi-finalist (Simone) Action/Cut Short Film Competition, USA 2010
- 2nd Place (Simone) Filmslam Film Festival, USA 2010
- Award Winner (Simone) Reel Terror Film Festival, USA 2010
- Best Short, Audience Choice (Simone) Shockerfest, USA 2010
- Best Atmosphere (The Stay) Independent Horror Movie Awards, USA 2015
- Finalist Book Pipeline Competition (The Lamplighters), USA 2015
- Best Story (The Stay) Things2Fear Film Fest, USA 2016
- Semifinalist (Skindred) ScreenCraft Sci-fi Screenplay Contest, USA 2016
- Quarter-finalist (The Reformatory) ScreenCraft Horror Screenplay Contest, USA 2017
- Best Short Film (The Stay) Changing Face International Film Festival, Australia 2017
- Silver Award Winner (The Stay) Spotlight Horror Film Awards, USA 2017
- Best Horror Short Silver Award (The Stay) Independent Shorts Awards, LA USA 2018
- Outstanding Directing Award (Frazer Lee, The Stay) ZedFest, Hollywood USA 2018
- Outstanding Screen Story Award (Frazer Lee, The Stay) ZedFest, Hollywood USA 2018
- The Edgar Allan Poe Gothic Filmmaker Award 2018 (Frazer Lee, The Stay) ZedFest, Hollywood USA 2018
- Best Writer (Frazer Lee, The Stay) Couch Film Festival, Toronto Canada 2019
- Best Mystery (Frazer Lee, The Stay) Hollywood Blood Horror Festival, Los Angeles USA 2019
- Creepy Tree Exemplar Award – Best Horror Film (Standard) – Creepy New Concept & Plot (Frazer Lee, The Stay) Creepy Tree Film Festival, USA 2020
- Best International Film (Frazer Lee, The Stay) The Thing in the Basement Horror Fest, USA 2020
- Outstanding Achievement Award (Short Films, Frazer Lee, The Stay) Virgin Spring Cinefest, 2021
- Special Mention (Frazer Lee, The Stay) Vesuvius International Film Festival, 2021
- Best Horror Short (Frazer Lee, The Stay) V.i.Z. Film Awards, Bulgaria 2021
- Best Short Horror (Frazer Lee, The Stay) Cult Movies International Film Festival, 2021
- Best Horror Short (Frazer Lee, The Stay) Madrid Arthouse Film Festival, 2022
- Best Mystery Thriller (Frazer Lee, The Stay) The Cyprus Horror Society 2022 Awards
- Best Horror Short (Frazer Lee, The Stay) Austin International Art Festival 2022
- Best Horror (Frazer Lee, The Stay) Make Art Not Fear Festival 2022
- Best Horror Short (Frazer Lee, The Stay) World Indie Film Awards 2023
- Best Horror/Mystery (Frazer Lee, The Stay) Reale Film Festival 2025
- Best Horror (Frazer Lee, The Stay) Night of Shorts 2025
- Best Short Film (Frazer Lee, The Stay) Whispers of the Universe International Film Festival 2026
