= Elen Rhys =

Welsh actress

- Born: Elen Rhys; Aberystwyth, Wales, United Kingdom
- Education: Royal Welsh College of Music and Drama
- Years active: 2007–present
- Children: 1

Elen Rhys is a Welsh actress. She is known for her roles as Gwen in the 2011 film Panic Button and as Miranda Blake in the BBC drama The Mallorca Files.

== Early life and education ==
Elen Rhys was born in Aberystwyth, Wales.

She trained at the Royal Welsh College of Music and Drama.

== Career ==
Rhys played Gwen in the 2011 film Panic Button

In 2016, Rhys secured the supporting role of Caz, the wife of main character Fletch in Ordinary Lies. The following year, she had another supporting role as Zoe in season 3 of the BBC series Broadchurch.

Rhys played the lead role of detective Miranda Blake in the BBC crime drama The Mallorca Files from 2019 to 2024. She was next seen in the co-lead role of Detective Inspector Ffion Lloyd, opposite Richard Harrington, in Welsh crime drama miniseries The One That Got Away.

== Personal life ==
Rhys has one child.

== Filmography ==
=== Film ===
Year	Title	Role	Notes
2011	Panic Button	Gwen	
2011	Season of the Witch	Peasant Girl	
2013	World War Z	Flight Attendant	
2013	A Viking Saga: The Darkest Day	Eara	
2015	The Rezort	Sadie	
2018	Apostle	Jennifer	
2019	The Krays' Mad Axeman	Lisa	
2023	Consent	Fiona	

=== Television ===
Year	Title	Role	Notes
2013	The Lingo Show	Blodwen	Voice role; 5 episodes
2016	Silent Witness	Amy Coulter	Episode: "River’s Edge"
2016	The Bastard Executioner	Petra Brattle	
2016	Ordinary Lies	Caz	Season 2
2017	Broadchurch	Zoe	Season 3, episode 4
2018	Casualty	Jodie Salsmann	Season 33, spisode 1
2019–present	The Mallorca Files	Miranda Blake	Main role
2021	Agatha Raisin (TV series)	Eirwen Jones	Episode: "There Goes The Bride"
2022	Hidden	Hannah Lewis	Season 3, recurring
2022	FBI: International	Amy Palmer	Episode: "Yesterday's Miracle"
2025	The One That Got Away	DI Ffion Lloyd	
