= The Sleeping Room =

2014 British film by John Shackleton

- Directed by: John Shackleton
- Written by: Ross Jameson; Alex Chandon; John Shackleton
- Produced by: Gareth I Davies; John Shackleton
- Starring: Leila Mimmack; Joseph Beattie; Julie Graham; Christopher Adamson; David Sibley; Chris Waller
- Cinematography: Simon Poulter
- Edited by: John Gillanders
- Music by: Paul Saunderson
- Production company: Movie Mogul Films
- Release date: 23 August 2014 (London FrightFest Film Festival)
- Running time: 78 minutes
- Country: United Kingdom
- Language: English

The Sleeping Room is a 2014 British horror film that was directed by John Shackleton. It had its world premiere on 23 August 2014 at the London FrightFest Film Festival and stars Leila Mimmack as a call girl who finds herself entangled in a series of strange events surrounding a hidden room. Funding for The Sleeping Room was raised using equity crowdfunding and is credited as being the first British film to use this method.

== Plot ==
Blue is a call girl working in Brighton that has been sent out to an old building that Bill is trying to restore. She's somewhat surprised when he shows little interest in having sex with her, but ends up staying in the house with him since he has paid for her time. As she is looking around, Blue discovers a mutoscope, through which she sees a series of moving images depicting a hooded man. Shortly after that, Blue and Bill discover a secret room that is the key to unlocking many dark and terrifying secrets relating to Blue’s family, and the death of her mother.

== Cast ==
- Julie Graham as Cynthia
- Christopher Adamson as Fiskin
- Joseph Beattie as Bill
- Chris Waller as Glenny
- Leila Mimmack as Blue
- David Sibley as Freddie
- Lucy Clements as Helena
- Nicola Colmer as TV presenter
- Billy Chainsaw as Neighbour
- Mike Altmann as Jim Whipps
- Antonia Northam as Abigail
- Chrisanthe Grech as Librarian
- Barry Kristopher Sullivan as TV presenter

== Reception ==
The film received generally negative reviews from critics, though the number of reviews is limited due to its limited release.

Nerdly gave The Sleeping Room a four star review and wrote "A superb example of modern British horror, The Sleeping Room, like fellow Frightfest movie The Forgotten, marks a new bright future for genre filmmaking in the UK that, in a perfect world, would be held in the same esteem as Hammer’s prolific output". Anton Bitel of Grolsch Film Works also praised The Sleeping Room, stating "Once the possessions and ghostly manifestations have fully kicked in, it all becomes a little Punch and Judy... but The Sleeping Room works best as an incestuous love letter to Brighton and the town's darker, ever-present history".

Coming Soon gave a mixed review for The Sleeping Room, writing "While the leads are appealing and Fiskin is very creepy looking, the mystery fails to deliver suspense or scares. The snuff films are meant to terrify, but they are more silly than scary as glimpsed through an old machine. And the conclusion, a dragged out chase and showdown in the old building, is perfunctory and fairly dull, making a short movie feel much longer than it actually is". Others were more critical such as Top 10 Films which, in its one-star review, praised the performance of actress Leila Mimmack but felt the film was handicapped by a convoluted script that contained "one-note characters" and a reliance on "horror tropes". It wrote: "[John] Shackleton never knows whether to stick or twist leaving The Sleeping Room engaging the wrong gears like a premature learner driver behind the wheel for the first time".

Jon Dickinson of Scream was disappointed with the lead role in the film, stating that "[John Shackleton] had a firm foundation to make his feature debut an incredibly creepy experience thanks to an interesting concept devised by [the screenwriters], but the end product is anything but".
