= Scarlett Alice Johnson =

English actress (born 1985)

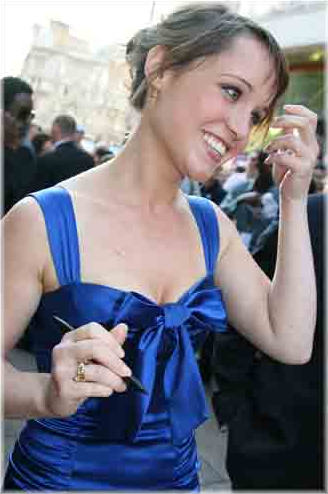
- Johnson in 2008
- Born: 7 April 1985 (age 41); Stroud Green, London, England
- Other name: Scarlett Verey
- Occupations: Actress; producer; teacher
- Years active: 1994–present
- Known for: EastEnders; Pramface
- Spouse: Sean Michael Verey (m. 2017)
- Children: 2

Scarlett Alice Johnson (born 7 April 1985) is an English actress, producer and drama teacher. She is known for her roles as Vicki Fowler in the BBC soap opera EastEnders and Laura Derbyshire in the BBC Three sitcom Pramface.

== Early life ==
Johnson was born in North London, England, and educated at the Highgate Wood School Arts College.

== Career ==
Whilst attending Highgate Wood School Arts College, Johnson was spotted by an agent in a production of Guys and Dolls, in which she played the lead. She subsequently appeared in numerous stage productions, including a six-month run in a National Theatre production of Dylan Thomas' Under Milk Wood directed by Roger Michell.

Her first television role, in 2003, was as Vicki Fowler on the BBC soap opera EastEnders. She spent nearly two years and 194 episodes in the show; for her portrayal of Vicki, she was ranked 83rd in EastEnders: The Greatest Cliffhangers.

Johnson left EastEnders at the end of 2004 to return to stage acting and embark on a career in films. In 2005, she played Juliet in an open air run of Romeo and Juliet at Stafford Castle and received favourable notices including in The Stage. In the same year she also appeared as the lead in the acclaimed UK tour of Henry James' Daisy Miller directed by Christopher Morahan and in the pantomime Cinderella at Stafford's Gatehouse Theatre.

In 2009 she played Mindy in a revival of Aunt Dan and Lemon at the Royal Court Theatre, receiving positive notices in the Evening Standard, The Guardian and The Times. In the same year, she played the role of Helen in the horror film The Reeds.

In April 2010, Johnson was cast by Warner Bros. in The CW network's US TV pilot Damn Thorpes (aka The Wyoming Project) opposite co-star Sean Faris (The Vampire Diaries). In the same year she also played the lead role in the UK film Panic Button and in the Channel 4 comedy Pete Versus Life as Trish, the girlfriend of Pete's friend Ollie. In February to March 2010 she appeared in the play Slaves for the Olivier award-winning Theatre503, London.

She joined the cast of E4's Beaver Falls for its second series, playing the role of PJ. The second series began airing in early August 2012, with the final episode of the series airing in early September 2012. It was announced on 22 September 2012 that the drama would not be recommissioned.

She played the role of Laura Derbyshire, a pregnant teenager and subsequently a new mother, in the BBC Three comedy Pramface, alongside her Beaver Falls co-star Emer Kenny. The first series piloted in late February 2012. She reprised her role for the second series which began airing in the new year of 2013 and was broadcast for a second time on BBC One throughout the summer of 2013. She reprised her role again for a third and final series, which started airing in late February 2014.

In 2019, she appeared in the 3rd series of ITV's medical drama The Good Karma Hospital, playing Tommy, the daughter of series regular Greg McConnell, played by Neil Morrissey.

Until 2022, Johnson was Vice Principal at the Bethnal Green Branch of Pauline Quirke Academy, with her husband, who was the Principal. She has also worked as an acting coach at City Academy in London.

== Filmography ==
=== Film ===
| Year | Title | Role | Notes |
|---|---|---|---|
| 2008 | Adulthood | Lexi | |
| 2009 | The Reeds | Helen | (credited as Scarlett Johnson) |
| 2010 | Pimp | Lizzie | |
| 2010 | Winter Sun | Girl | (short) |
| 2011 | Panic Button | Jo | |

=== Television ===
Television roles
| Year | Title | Role | Notes |
|---|---|---|---|
| | Freaks | Debbie | |
| 2003–2004 | EastEnders | Vicki Fowler | Regular role |
| 2010 | Pete Versus Life | Trish | |
| 2011–2012 | Beaver Falls | PJ | 6 episodes |
| 2012–2014 | Pramface | Laura Derbyshire | 19 episodes |
| 2013 | Big Bad World | Lucy Deacon | |
| 2013 | Midsomer Murders | Jessie | Episode: "The Flying Club" |
| 2017 | Loaded | Paula | |
| 2017 | Josh | Millie | |
| 2018 | Call the Midwife | Olive Mawson | |
| 2020 | The Good Karma Hospital | Tommy McConnell | |
| 2022 | Casualty | Tara Rawlin | Episode: "Delayed Reaction" |
| 2026 | Death in Paradise | Keira Mayhew | Series 15, Episode 2 |

== Stage ==
| Year | Title | Role | Notes |
|---|---|---|---|
| 1996 | La bohème – centenary performance | Posh girl | |
| 1996 | Yehudi Menuhin – 80th Birthday Concert | Chorus | |
| 2005 | Cinderella | Cinderella | |
| 2005 | Daisy Miller | Daisy | |
| 2005 | Romeo and Juliet | Juliet | |
| 2009 | Aunt Dan and Lemon | Mindy | |
| 2010 | Slaves | Jessica/Melissa | |
| 2014 | The Angry Brigade | | |
| 2016 | Radiant Vermin | | |
