= The Mallorca Files =

British television series

- Genre: Crime drama; Mystery; Procedural
- Created by: Dan Sefton
- Starring: Elen Rhys; Julian Looman; María Fernández Ache; Nacho Aldeguer; Alex Hafner; Nansi Nsue as Luisa Rosa; Tábata Cerezo
- Composer: Charlie Mole
- Country of origin: United Kingdom
- Original language: English
- No. of series: 3
- No. of episodes: 24

Production
- Executive producers: Ben Donald; Murray Ferguson
- Producer: Dominic Barlow
- Production locations: Mallorca, Spain
- Cinematography: Jan Jonaeus; Søren Bay
- Running time: 45 minutes
- Production companies: Cosmopolitan Pictures; Clerkenwell Films

Original release
- Network: BBC One (series 1–2); Amazon Prime Video (series 3)
- Release: 25 November 2019 – present

The Mallorca Files is a British police procedural television drama series set on the Spanish island of Mallorca, starring Elen Rhys and Julian Looman. The series, originally broadcast on BBC One, was created by Dan Sefton. It focuses on a Welsh detective, Miranda Blake (Rhys), and a German detective, Max Winter (Looman), as they solve crimes on the Spanish island of Mallorca. The first two series were broadcast on BBC One, with series three moving to Amazon Prime Video. Series 1 was broadcast in France on the France 2 channel in June 2020.

A second series was confirmed on 11 November 2019, before the first episode was broadcast. Series 2 aired on BBC One from 1 February 2021 and all episodes were available on BBC iPlayer from that date. It was later recommissioned for a third series, which was filmed in Mallorca between March and July 2023. The third series began airing on 8 August 2024 on Prime.

== Synopsis ==
Total opposites Miranda Blake from Wales, a Detective Constable with London's Metropolitan Police, and Max Winter, a German detective, are forced to team up to solve crimes by Inés Villegas, the Chief of Palma Police. They are generally crimes committed against the international community on the island of Mallorca, Villegas usually giving them cases with less importance because they are not Spanish detectives.

== Cast ==
=== Main cast ===
- Elen Rhys as Detective Miranda Blake
- Julian Looman as Detective Max Winter
- María Fernández Ache as Chief Inés Villegas
- Nacho Aldeguer as Federico Ramis, forensic pathologist (Series 1)
- Alex Hafner as Roberto Herrero, forensic pathologist (Series 2–)
- Nansi Nsue as Luisa Rosa, forensic assistant (Series 2)
- Tábata Cerezo as Carmen Lorenzo, Max's girlfriend

=== Recurring cast ===
- Denis Schmidt as Christian, Max's best friend
- Carlos Olalla as Joan Lorenzo, Carmen's father
- Tanya Moodie as Supt. Abbey Palmer, Blake's former boss (Series 1)
- David Mora as Detective Benito Mancuso, a detective from Barcelona helping out the Palma Police (Series 3)

== Production ==
Series 1 and 2 were a co-production between Cosmopolitan Pictures, Clerkenwell Films, BritBox US and Canada, ZDFneo and France 2. Series 3 is a co-production between Cosmopolitan Pictures, Clerkenwell Films, BBC Studios, and Amazon MGM Studios.

Cosmopolitan Pictures founder Ben Donald said the series came from "[a] desire to create a feel-good action-driven cop show like the ones I grew up with and, secondly, a desire to rebrand and refresh the Anglo-German relationship on television." Filming for the first series started in November 2018.

Filming on the second series was interrupted due to the COVID-19 pandemic. Only six of the planned ten episodes were produced. Despite announcements prior to the series premiere, Nacho Aldeguer and Tanya Moodie did not return to the series, even though Moodie had become a regular cast member. Episodes penned by Rachael New, Alex McBride, Jackie Okwera and Emily Fairweather were written for the series, with Rob Evans signed on to direct. The unfilmed episodes are expected to be carried over into the third series. Producer Ben Donald stated that post-production on the six finished episodes was completed in August 2020. Phil Daniels and Josette Simon were later confirmed amongst the guest actors cast.

Filming on the third series took place on location in Mallorca in March to July 2023.

== Episodes ==
Series	Episodes	Originally released	
Series	Episodes	First released	Last released
1	10	25 November 2019	6 December 2019
2	6	1 February 2021	8 February 2021
3	8	8 August 2024	8 August 2024

=== Series 1 (2019) ===
No. overall	No. in series	Title	Directed by	Written by	Original release date	BBC One Broadcast
1	1	"Honour Amongst Thieves"	Bryn Higgins	Dan Sefton	25 November 2019	25 November 2019
While being escorted back to Britain by Miranda Blake, gangland witness Niall Taylor (played by Aidan McArdle) is murdered at Palma airport, and Miranda is saved from the same fate by Max Winter, who was at the airport meeting his girlfriend. After being ordered to return to London by her boss, Miranda connives to stay in Mallorca to find the killer. Chief of police Inés Villegas teams her with Max, and they investigate as more members of the same gang are murdered.
2	2	"King of the Mountains"	Charles Palmer	Dan Muirden	25 November 2019	26 November 2019
While Inés is away, Miranda and Max investigate the apparent kidnap of local hero Esteban Domenech, who became a cycling superstar after his parents and brother were all killed in a car crash. Max and Miranda suspect one of Domenech's teammates, Philippe Tromeur, or the manager of a rival team, Terry Davies, who are both convinced Domenech has been taking performance enhancing drugs, despite him never failing a drug test. Domenech later escapes his kidnappers, and Miranda notices how his wife's attitude changes towards her husband at different times.
3	3	"The Oligarch's Icon"	Bryn Higgins	Alex McBride & Dan Sefton	25 November 2019	27 November 2019
Miranda and Max investigate the theft of an invaluable icon being returned to the church it had been stolen from centuries before, which has now been returned by Kati Gorenka, the widow of an assassinated Russian oligarch. Following a lead, they discover an artist's studio, whose uncooperative owner disappears before they can search the premises with a warrant. When the icon later turns up out of the blue, Max and Miranda suspect it is a fake, and secretly search Gorenka's luxury yacht. Miranda finds the real icon, Max finds the body of the artist, and both are confronted by her bodyguard.
4	4	"Number One Fan"	Charles Palmer	Rachael New	25 November 2019	28 November 2019
Max and Miranda investigate the disappearance of supermodel Valentina Caligari, who vanished from a local train en route from Sóller to Palma. Their investigation zooms in on the Caligaris’ chef, Richard Webb, who is revealed to have secretly been in love with Valentina, but he denies having caused her any harm. After an attempted escape from the Caligari estate, Webb is arrested, and admits that he'd followed Valentina on the day of her disappearance. Although he has the necklace Valentina was wearing when she'd boarded the train, he claims he found it the morning she disappeared. Continuing evidence eventually leads Max and Miranda to a less obvious explanation: Valentina was never on the train. When they can't find Valentina's brother, Otto, at the estate, they head to the marina, where they discover Otto with Valentina's girlfriend, Azra Bolat. They reveal to the detectives that an argument had broken out at the estate, during which Valentina had slipped and hit her head on the tiles. Otto had then disguised himself as Valentina on the train, and jumped off it when Webb had entered the carriage. Otto and Azra then dumped Valentina's body in the sea, and had planned to go away together with Azra's baby. Max also helps Miranda overcome her claustrophobia, and the force celebrates Inés' 45th birthday.
5	5	"Sour Grapes"	Gordon Anderson	Dan Muirden	25 November 2019	29 November 2019
A dog is killed out in the Mallorcan countryside at a vineyard owned by the Schröder family. Max and Miranda soon learn that it could be connected to a series of anonymous threatening letters, which had been sent to the family over the preceding six months. Rainer Schröder later discovers a tank of his wine has been tampered with, deepening the mystery of who is responsible. Max and Miranda talk to Emilio Byass, the owner of a rivalling vineyard, and learn that his son, Julio Byass, was in love with Stephanie Weber, the sister of Rainer's wife, Yvonne Schröder. Footage of Rainer and Yvonne's daughter is later discovered, and soil from the most recent threatening letter reveals that it originated from the Byass vineyard. Upon arriving there, Max and Miranda discover Rainer Schröder confronting Margalida Byass, Emilio's daughter. She escapes on her brother's bike and nearly kills herself on a rail crossing, but narrowly escapes after being talked out of it by Miranda. Back at the Schröder vineyard, Winter learns from Rainer that the torn-down vineyard building was demolished in 1991, the same year that Stephanie and Julio Byass supposedly died in a boating accident. Skeletal remains are later discovered beneath the soil, and it's revealed that Hans Weber, Yvonne and Stephanie's father, had shot Julio while he and Stephanie were eloping to Menorca. Julio's death had then caused Stephanie to take her own life with Hans' rifle.
6	6	"To Kill a Stag"	Rob Evans	Sarah-Louise Hawkins	25 November 2019	2 December 2019
A German groom-to-be named Karl is found dead in the swimming pool of a luxury villa. Max and Miranda discover that Karl had been robbed and dumped in the pool afterwards. Evidence subsequently points to Karl having a liaison with a prostitute, even though he was going to marry Chloe Sumner, the sister of one of his stags, Danny Sumner. Chloe later arrives in Mallorca to deal with the aftermath of Karl's death. Max and Miranda go on an undercover mission to apprehend their prime suspect, Cariño De La Noche, and track her to a luxury villa, where Christian, a friend of Max, has been tased by Cariño. After apprehending Cariño, she admits she robbed Karl, but claims she never killed anyone. It's later revealed that Karl's friend Torsten had wanted to prove to Chloe that Karl was having an affair, but he never got any photographs of a sexual encounter between Karl and Cariño. He also reveals to Chloe that he thought they could still be together after a one-night stand, something Chloe refuses before Max and Miranda arrive and arrest Torsten for Karl's murder.
7	7	"Friend Henry"	Bryn Higgins	Alex McBride & Dan Sefton	25 November 2019	3 December 2019
German DJ Kurt Sommer is found dead in his hotel room after a night's performance, from an apparent overdose, which is later proven to be correct. In addition to Sommer's death, Max and Miranda apprehend María, a girl who works as a drug dealer for Luis Gardera, a notorious drug lord. They ask her to work for them as an informant so they can apprehend Gardera, which she accepts on the condition that she works with them and them alone, as Gardera has informants throughout the police. After a detour from her original pick-up, María seems to be in danger when Heinrich, one of Gardera's enforcers, confronts María about her talking to the police. She manages to persuade him that working as an informant could sway in Gardera's favour and asks to speak to Gardera about it. The day after, she is brought to Gardera's mansion in the countryside, with Max, Miranda, and police units on their tail. At the mansion, María fails to persuade Gardera that she could help him by becoming a police informant, and she's brought to a room to be executed, before Heinrich turns on Gardera just as the police burst in and arrest him. It's revealed that María was best friends with Alba, Heinrich's sister and a victim of Gardera, and that the entire operation, including her becoming an informant, was planned beforehand, so they could bring the police straight to Gardera.
8	8	"Death in the Morning"	Bryn Higgins	Rachael New	25 November 2019	4 December 2019
British author Nicholas Mountford is murdered like a bull in a bullfight, by an unknown matador in a bullring in Cazador. Max and Miranda face a town that hardly speaks, but later suspect the bullring security guard's father, Manu Alzamora. Though he admits he was in debt to Mountford, he did not kill him. Max and Miranda are asked by Inés to stay in Cazador until the case is solved, something Miranda is against, and which leads the two detectives to a near-kiss during a Paso Doble. Max and Miranda's suspicion later falls on Alzamora's son, Victor, after a prior record with Mountford is discovered by the police in Palma. They discover that Victor was having an affair with Mountford's wife, Leanne, but that he really expressed love for her. Despite this, neither one of them was responsible for the murder of Mountford, given their alibi in the timeline of his murder. At the bullring, Max and Miranda examine the matador suit and sword, where they discover blood on the suit cuff, and a chipped part of the sword that perfectly matches a fragment of metal found in Mountford's stab wound. They ask bullring manager Cati Herrero to close the ongoing festival while also sharing their discovery. Herrero tries to escape after accidentally revealing that she already knew the sword was chipped, but she's stopped by Max and Miranda. It's revealed that Herrero murdered Mountford because he had discovered the truth about her father, and had been planning to publish this in his new book, which would have stripped Herrero's father of his status as a legendary bullfighter.
9	9	"Mallorca's Most Wanted"	Rob Evans	Sarah-Louise Hawkins	25 November 2019	5 December 2019
A drug bust at a club owned by Rob King leads Max and Miranda onto the case of catching Mallorca's Most Wanted — the owner's brother, Charlie King, who allegedly killed his girlfriend Gabriela, and has now returned to Mallorca to see his dying father. The manhunt leads to Mike Fowler, a close friend of Charlie, who is the only person who he trusted outside the family. Fowler admits his friendship with Charlie, but claims he never would have provided a hiding place for him on his return to the island. Max and Miranda don't find anything in Fowler's apartment, but do find evidence in his boat that someone had been staying there. Miranda spots Charlie on the way to the boat, but he escapes after locking her and Max in the port. It's later discovered that Max's girlfriend, Carmen, was a friend of Gabriela, and she reveals vital information about Gabriela's life and relationship with Charlie King. Miranda eventually comes up with a theory that the lead investigator of Gabriela's murder, Ramón Hernández, might be corrupt, given evidence from a hotel and the fact that he was the policemen who Gabriela formerly had a relationship with. She does not get support from Max or Inés, but decides to investigate on her own nonetheless. After looking for clues in the warehouse of the suppliers for Rob King's club, Miranda is knocked unconscious in her car and then tied up in the warehouse by Rob. It's revealed that Miranda was correct about Hernández being corrupt, and that Gabriela was killed because she learned about it. Worried that Miranda may be in trouble, Max goes to the warehouse to investigate, and is also captured. After the two of them have a near-death experience, it's revealed that Max had called for backup before going to find Miranda. Hernández and Rob King are arrested, and Miranda gives Charlie a chance to see his dying father in hospital.
10	10	"Ex Factor"	Bryn Higgins	Dan Sefton	25 November 2019	6 December 2019
Max and Miranda are given a case of stolen music equipment at Jürgen Kuhl's residence and studio, where he also hosts a controversial music show. During their inquiries, a participant, Jens Schmitt, who is chastised by Kuhl for not singing his songs, grabs Max's gun and holds everyone in the residence hostage, including Miranda. He demands that the situation be broadcast live and that he can sing a song, written by himself, to his ex-girlfriend Lena. Outside, Inés insists on waiting for mainland negotiators, but Max disagrees, expressing that they should move in given that Schmitt seems unstable. Before his performance, Schmitt ties Kuhl with tape to a chair with Miranda's help. After the keyboardist, Carlos, has an apparent panic attack, Miranda takes over. In the meantime, Max breaks with Inés' plan and sneaks onto the premises in a surprise attack. When Inés spots Max on the live feed, she orders other officers to move in. Max surprises Schmitt from behind as the remaining officers storm the house and surround him. Having performed his song, Schmitt is arrested, but is cheered by the crowd that gathered outside the premises. Max also suggests marriage to Carmen, something she decides she wants to put on hold, and Miranda gets a promotion in London, but she eventually decides to stay in Mallorca because she feels it's become her new home.

=== Series 2 (2021) ===
No. overall	No. in series	Title	Directed by	Written by	Original release date	BBC One Broadcast
11	1	"The Maestro"	Bryn Higgins	Dan Sefton	1 February 2021	1 February 2021
Max and Miranda investigate two seemingly unrelated deaths — opera singer José Castaña, and a woman who killed herself by drowning in the sea. They discover the woman was a violin player, and that Castaña was a known philanderer. The dead woman was pregnant by Castaña, and suspicion falls on Castaña's manager, Elvira Cortez, who also had a baby by Castaña. Inés is left to make a decision when Miranda and Max present the #MeToo/I am Spartacus confessions from twenty-seven women who had known the maestro.
12	2	"Son of a Pig"	Bryn Higgins	Damian Wayling	1 February 2021	2 February 2021
Max and Miranda investigate the disappearance of Diego Gris, a much-hated man. Evidence suggests it may be linked to an archaeological dig which has uncovered the remains of eight republicans murdered during the Spanish Civil War by Diego's father, known as The Pig. Unexpected help comes from a private investigator, employed by the Gris family, who is more interested in a ninth skeleton found near the dig — possibly that of his grandfather, a volunteer on the republican side.
13	3	"A Dish Served Cold"	Craig Pickles	Sarah-Louise Hawkins	1 February 2021	3 February 2021
Max and Miranda investigate the poisoning of food critic Oliver Barker during a meal cooked by his favourite chef. Their suspects are those seated at the table and the staff of the restaurant, until the autopsy reveals he had been poisoned the day before with amanita mushrooms. Delving into the victim's and suspects’ pasts, Max and Miranda discover a connection in the past and a motive for revenge. A revenge that also threatens the lives of innocent partygoers.
14	4	"The Beautiful Game"	Craig Pickles	Dan Muirden	1 February 2021	4 February 2021
Max and Miranda investigate death threats against Rico Alonso, star player for Real Mallorca, who's been receiving these threats because of his upcoming move to a German team for €40 million. Suspects include his best friend Carlos, who retired from football due to injury, Rico's team coach, his agent, his mother, and an obsessive fan who doesn't want him to leave Real Mallorca. When Carlos is murdered, attention turns to Rico's mother, who used to follow Rico and Carlos's careers as young teammates.
15	5	"The Blue Feather"	Christiana Ebohon-Green	Tim Whitnall	1 February 2021	5 February 2021
Max and Miranda investigate the disappearance of diabetic Tony Ball, a British birdwatcher. Believing he may be on a nature reserve, they find his campervan and his insulin supply, creating a greater urgency to find him. Their investigation stumbles across a bird-smuggling ring, and they wonder if Ball had also discovered it, or was part of the ring. They are also hindered by uncooperative reserve wardens, one with a criminal record.
16	6	"The Outlaw Jose Rey"	Christiana Ebohon-Green	Liz Lake	1 February 2021	8 February 2021
Max and Miranda head to the other side of the island to investigate credit card fraud against tourists at a horse-riding ranch. Finding evidence, they charge José Rey — grandson of the owner Xisco Rey, who was about to retire and pass on the ranch to José. Max and Miranda are called back to the ranch the following day when Xisco is found dead, and a horseback manhunt for José — their prime suspect for the murder — begins, with the two detectives led by José's mentor Javier, who is not happy because José is to marry his daughter. Javier relates the history of the Rey family; José's missing father, his drunken mother, and a grandfather not wanting to retire.

=== Series 3 (2024) ===
No. overall	No. in series	Title	Directed by	Written by	Original release date
17	1	"All That Glisters"	Craig Pickles	Dan Muirden	8 August 2024
The geography teacher inventor of an island-wide treasure hunt is kidnapped after a television appearance, and Max and Miranda race to try to save his life. Max focuses on solving the puzzle, while Miranda considers this wasting time. While they are too late to save the man, they do work out who killed him and make an arrest. Max’s father makes his first visit to the island and there is friction between father and son.
18	2	"Clandestino"	Rob Evans	Dan Sefton & Jackie Okwera	8 August 2024
When a Mallorcan aristocrat is murdered at a big charity function in Palma, suspicion falls on one of the city’s immigrant street-peddlers. With the help of a young lookout for the street-sellers, Max and Miranda work together to prove who really committed the murder.
19	3	"The Spanish Prisoner"	Craig Pickles	Dan Sefton	8 August 2024
Max and Miranda go undercover as a wealthy married couple to try and capture a notorious conman. All is not as it seems, and after a high-speed boat chase, Inés reveals she’d worked it out from the start, catching the real conman while keeping her detectives in the dark. Max and Carmen’s relationship is tested when she gets a job in Madrid and Max doesn’t want to leave the island.
20	4	"Water Water Everywhere"	Craig Pickles	Dan Muirden	8 August 2024
Max and Miranda investigate arson in a rural village that has become the focus of an election, due to the mayor wanting to flood it to create a reservoir and help solve the island’s water shortage problems. The detectives have to unravel the intertwining of politics and eco-activism to solve the murder of a woman found near the village.
21	5	"The Great Escape"	Kate Cheeseman	Sarah-Louise Hawkins	8 August 2024
An incarcerated accountant escapes on the island while being transferred between prisons, and Max and Miranda find themselves working with an overbearing officer from Barcelona to track him down before a gangster from the mainland gets to him. While initially very cool towards their new colleague Detective Mancuso, Miranda eventually warms to him, leaving Max confused when he sees them kissing.
22	6	"A Girls Best Friend"	Rob Evans	Emily Fairweather	8 August 2024
A diamond smuggling bust in Palma goes wrong, with Max picking up the remains of someone’s lunch instead of the jewels. Annoyed, Inés sends Max and Miranda undercover in a luxury resort hotel to investigate some petty thefts from guests’ rooms. In the course of their investigations, they solve both the thefts and the diamond smuggling, which one of the hotel’s employees turns out to be involved in. Over from Barcelona to tie up some loose ends in the escaped prisoner case, Mancuso asks Miranda out for dinner.
23	7	"Madre"	Kate Cheeseman	Dan Sefton & Alex McBride	8 August 2024
Reluctantly on annual leave, workaholic Miranda can’t help getting involved when a body is found across the water from a women-only island retreat. She joins the retreat ostensibly on holiday, but spends her time investigating the death, getting herself into mortal danger in the process. Max and Mancuso race to the island to save her.
24	8	"The Enemy Within"	Craig Pickles	Sarah-Louise Hawkins	8 August 2024
Max and Miranda investigate the disappearance of a journalist, and end up uncovering a plot to assassinate a film star during a climate summit being held at an industrialist-turned-eco-warrior’s luxury estate. Max and Miranda have their biggest row since the heated argument in the early days of their partnership, patched up only when a near-death experience shows them how much they mean to each other.

== Soundtrack ==
The Mallorca Files (Music from Series One of the Television Series)

Soundtrack album by Charlie Mole
- Released: 28 February 2020
- Genre: Soundtrack
- Length: 51:46
- Label: Dubois Records

A soundtrack consisting of music from series one of The Mallorca Files was digitally released in February 2020. Music on the album was composed by Charlie Mole, and included guest vocals from Anna Ross who performs on the show's title and closing tracks.

No.	Title	Length
1.	"Surrender (feat. Anna Ross)"	3:30
2.	"Time on our Side (feat. Anna Ross) [Single Version]"	3:26
3.	"The Mallorca Files Theme"	4:32
4.	"Investigating"	1:14
5.	"Mallorca Time"	1:53
6.	"The Train"	1:36
7.	"Time for Business"	1:21
8.	"The Chase"	1:38
9.	"The Bullring"	1:59
10.	"The Balcony Scene"	2:10
11.	"Horas de Barra"	1:51
12.	"Bike Race"	1:04
13.	"Hombre de Lyrca"	1:37
14.	"Goodbye"	3:01
15.	"Mahler's Twist Symphony"	3:52
16.	"The Tail"	4:44
17.	"The Dealer"	2:57
18.	"Ja Ja Ja Auf Wiedersehen Baby"	2:15
19.	"Oh Lena"	4:46
20.	"It's My Life (End Credits Reprise)"	2:11
Total length:		51:46
