= David Sibley (actor) =

English actor

David Sibley (born 16 July 1948) is an English actor.

He is known for character roles in several television series: as twisted radio DJ Tom Everett in BBC television detective series Shoestring (in the episode Mocking Bird); and in Doctor Who as Pralix (in The Pirate Planet). He appeared on a DVD extra when this story was released recently. His first regular television role was in Wings in 1977.

Other appearances include Blake's 7, Survivors, Fun at the Funeral Parlour, Target, Minder, Lovejoy, and the film Gandhi. He appeared as Eric Birling in the 1982 BBC adaptation of J.B. Priestley's An Inspector Calls. He returned to television in The Year That London Blew Up (1995), a dramatisation of the IRA attacks on London in 1974–75. He played John Carver in Midsomer Murders in 2010. Between 2001 and 2012 he played four different characters in Doctors. In 2012 he was in New Tricks episode Part Of A Whole, playing journalist Nigel Baxter. In 2014, Sibley starred as Freddie in the supernatural thriller The Sleeping Room.

== Filmography ==
Film
| Year | Title | Role | Notes |
|---|---|---|---|
| 1982 | Gandhi | Subaltern | |
| 1988 | Willow | Galladoorn Warrior | Uncredited |
| 1989 | Great Balls of Fire! | Third English Reporter | |
| 1994 | Princess Caraboo | Harrison | |
| 1997 | Incognito | Whitehurst Landlord | |
| 1999 | Guest House Paradiso | Intimidating Man | |
| 2013 | Closed Circuit | Vicar | |
| 2014 | The Sleeping Room | Freddie | |
| 2015 | 45 Years | George | |
| 2023 | Tuesday | Robert | |

Television
| Year | Film | Role | Notes |
|---|---|---|---|
| 1983 | Give Us a Break | Billy Wilson | 4 episodes |
| 2015 | Silent Witness | Judge Gilmore | Episode: "Protection" (2 parts) |
| 2022 | Death in Paradise | Julius Rotfeld | Season 11, episode 8 |
