= John Shackleton (filmmaker) =

British filmmaker

- Occupations: Film director; screenwriter; producer

John Shackleton is a British film director, screenwriter and producer. He co-wrote and produced the 2011 horror film Panic Button and made his feature-film directorial debut with the 2014 horror film The Sleeping Room, which he also co-wrote and produced. He has also been involved in developing alternative methods of financing independent films, including the Movie Mogul film-funding venture and the use of equity crowdfunding for The Sleeping Room.

== Career ==
In 2007, The Guardian reported on a film-funding venture developed by Shackleton that allowed members of the public to financially support proposed independent films and take part in aspects of their development. The newspaper described the project as the "brainchild" of Shackleton, who was then working as a film producer in Cardiff.

Shackleton later co-wrote and produced Panic Button, a British horror thriller directed by Chris Crow. The screenplay was credited to Crow, Frazer Lee, Shackleton and David Shillitoe. In a 2017 interview with Screenwords, Shackleton said that the idea developed from an earlier filmmaking exercise based around deliberately restrictive production rules, before he and Shillitoe began developing the feature concept.

In 2013, Screen Daily reported that Shackleton's next feature, The Sleeping Room, would use equity crowdfunding to finance its production, describing it as the first UK film to use the funding method in which backers received an equity stake. The film was released in 2014 and marked Shackleton's feature-film directorial debut. He directed the film, co-wrote the screenplay with Ross Jameson and Alex Chandon, and produced it with Gareth I. Davies.

The Sleeping Room premiered at FrightFest in 2014. Critical response was mixed. SFFWorld praised the film's atmosphere and Shackleton's emphasis on character over visual effects, while Starburst found the film engaging but criticised its lack of scares and tension.

== Filmography ==
Year	Title	Role	Ref.
2011	Panic Button	Screenwriter, producer	
2014	The Sleeping Room	Director, screenwriter, producer	
