= Panic Button (2011 film) =

- Directed by: Chris Crow
- Screenplay by: Chris Crow; Frazer Lee
- Produced by: John Shackleton
- Starring: Scarlett Alice Johnson; Michael Jibson; Jack Gordon; Elen Rhys; Joshua Richards; Millie Midwinter
- Music by: Mark Rutherford
- Release date: 27 August 2011 (Film4 FrightFest)
- Country: United Kingdom
- Language: English
- Budget: £300,000

Panic Button is a British independent horror-thriller film released in 2011. The film is intended as a cautionary tale on the dangers of online social networking.

== Plot ==
Four young people win the competition of a lifetime; Jo, Max, Gwen and Dave head off on an all expenses paid trip to New York, courtesy of the social network All2gethr.com. As they board the private jet, they are asked to relinquish their mobile phones and take part in the in-flight entertainment – a new online gaming experience. An animated alligator on-screen asks them a series of personal questions that they are supposed to answer truthfully. The alligator then reveals the embarrassing lies they have told.

The next round of questions reveals even more lies about their sexual pasts, which the alligator says have been tracked through their All2gethr accounts. When Dave refuses to continue and Max tries unsuccessfully to send an email for help, the screen shows them apparently live footage of friends being tortured and killed. They are all then told to come one at a time to the plane's bathroom to be given an individual task. They are shown someone close to them and told that if they fail in the task that person will die. They have 45 minutes to complete the tasks, after which the plane will be crashed and they will all die. Max reveals that he is not actually Max, but hacked into Max's account to take the prize. Dave and Max fight, and Max kills Dave. They are shown Max's brother having an arm cut off and Dave's fiancée being killed by the alligator. Jo gives Max wine, which he drinks.

Gwen tries to seduce Max in the bathroom, as this is now her task. Max realises the plane's hold adjoins the bathroom, and starts to break through with an axe. Gwen tries to stop him and has her neck broken by Jo. Gwen's sister is shown being set alight. Max breaks through into the hold and finds the bodies of their friends: they have been watching recordings of them being killed. Max finds his laptop and attempts to get help, but the pilot demands the laptop from him, and destroys it. Jo and Max scuffle with the pilot. Max starts to feel ill; as he dies Jo reveals that she has poisoned him with the wine as her task. Jo and the pilot stand off and the alligator demands he go back into the cockpit or else his family will die. Jo tries to convince him that they are already dead. Before he goes back into the cockpit, he tazes Jo. She eventually regains consciousness.

Jo, as the only survivor, is shown a video of a girl, Lucy Turner, committing suicide. The alligator reveals that all four of them had watched the video and made disparaging comments about it rather than trying to save her. He is going to release the video of their ordeal and tells Jo he harmed her daughter. With 6 minutes to impact, Jo runs to the exit of the plane and manages to open the plug door, getting sucked out of the plane just before it crashes into the sea. News reporters talk about the wreckage, confirming the video went viral. Jo's daughter, Sophie, is shown with the man who was the alligator. He introduces himself as Rupert Turner and tells her that she is no longer Sophie, but Lucy. He introduces her to her new "mother" and "brother." The film ends with them walking away hand in hand.

== Cast ==
- Scarlett Alice Johnson as Jo
- Jack Gordon as Max
- Michael Jibson as Dave
- Elen Rhys as Gwen
- Joshua Richards as Alligator/Rupert Turner
- Vern Raye as Callahan
- Kezia Burrows as Newsreader
- Sarah Parks as Annie Turner
- Millie Midwinter as Lucy Turner
- David Morgan as Man with Suitcases

== Release ==
The film has been screened at the London FrightFest Film Festival and at the Cannes Film Festival. Panic Button was released onto DVD and Blu-ray on 7 November 2011.

== Reception ==
Critical reception for the film was mixed. Dread Central criticized the movie's "undercooked climax and frankly preposterous final scene", but praised the film's acting and directing. Bloody Disgusting called the movie "a lame cyber-bullying metaphor disguised as a mildly diverting Brit B-flick."
