= Pete versus Life =

- Genre: Sitcom
- Created by: George Jeffrie; Bert Tyler-Moore
- Starring: Rafe Spall; Pippa Duffy; Reece Ritchie; Scarlett Alice Johnson
- Country of origin: United Kingdom
- Original language: English
- No. of series: 2
- No. of episodes: 11

Production
- Camera setup: Single-camera
- Running time: 25 minutes
- Production company: Objective Productions

Original release
- Network: Channel 4
- Release: 6 August 2010 – 9 December 2011

Pete versus Life is a Channel 4 sitcom created by George Jeffrie and Bert Tyler-Moore. It stars Rafe Spall and the first episode was aired on 6 August 2010. It was recommissioned for a second series after averaging 1.6 million viewers and a young demographic during its first run, and series two started airing on 21 October 2011.

== Synopsis ==
The programme follows the misadventures of Pete Griffiths, a budding sports journalist in London struggling with both his personal and professional life, dealing with issues such as relationships and trying to find work as a major reporter. He often finds himself in socially awkward situations and can never quite find the right things to say. Whilst he goes about his everyday doings, he is commentated on by two announcers as if his life were a sports broadcast. The two commentators often cringe at the humiliating positions Pete ends up in, and are unprofessional in their approach. One of the commentators, Terry McIllroy, is an ex-professional footballer and is loosely based on real life co-commentator and former Sky Sports pundit, Andy Gray.

== Cast ==
- Rafe Spall as Pete Griffiths
- Joseph Kloska as Rob
- Pippa Duffy as Anna
- Reece Ritchie as Ollie
- Chris Geere as Kurt
- Daniel Ings as Jake Oakman
- Philip Jackson as Frank Griffiths
- Susannah Fielding as Chloe Richardson
- Scarlett Alice Johnson as Trish
- David Fynn as Manfred
- Simon Greenall as Colin King
- Ian Kirkby as Terry McIlroy
- Catherine Russell as Jen

== Episode list ==
=== Series 1 (2010) ===
No.	Title	Original release date	UK viewers (millions)
1	"Eco Warrior"	6 August 2010	1.33
Pete inadvertently impresses a young lady when he lies about his commitment to green issues to get out of a stag weekend in Amsterdam when he finds the bride is coming as well. Pete quickly realises that to maintain his new relationship, he's going to have to make a few changes.
2	"Fankoo"	13 August 2010	1.43
Pete goes to a party where Jake, a friend but also a rival, reveals an intimate detail about his sex life. Pete promises to keep it a secret and then tells everyone.
3	"Older Woman"	20 August 2010	1.88
Pete meets an attractive older lady at an art auction, and they hit it off. But being a 'boy toy' results in complications with the woman's husband.
4	"Marriage of Convenience"	27 August 2010	1.64
Pete realises that he's too selfish and decides to turn his life around. His first altruistic act is to agree to a visa marriage with Kurt's girlfriend from Zimbabwe, which is shown to be a sham when Pete's parents show at the same time as an immigration agent.
5	"Ollie's Girlfriend"	3 September 2010	1.11 (overnight)
Pete finally gets a decent sports writing job but it's on the basis of a pretend relationship with his best mate's girlfriend. Problems ensue when an office romance blossoms.

=== Series 2 (2011) ===
No.	Title	Original release date	UK viewers (millions)
1	"Mum's Cleaner"	21 October 2011	N/A
Pete takes on the responsibility of walking an old woman's dog, and tries to get to know his mother's attractive Polish cleaning woman, who has some kinky fetishes.
2	"Frank Leaves Noreen"	28 October 2011	N/A
Pete is trying to get back with his ex-girlfriend, Chloe, and is not helped when his dad turns up, has an affair, and decides to separate from Pete's mum.
3	"The Tennis Player"	4 November 2011	N/A
Pete gets a chance to revive his sports journalist career by writing a critical article about a female tennis player. It is published in a national paper, and all would be well... if he wasn't dating the player he wrote about.
4	"A Night at the Light Opera"	11 November 2011	N/A
Pete wins some tickets to see the hit musical Mamma Mia! and manages to find a date, Helene. Helene is much more intelligent than Pete, which doesn't bode well. Pete knicks a jacket from a thrift store which ruins his chances with Helene.
5	"The Veteran"	25 November 2011	N/A
Pete claims that he's been in the army in order to impress Mel, his new girlfriend. Unfortunately for Pete, her brother Tom is a genuine veteran.
6	"Does Pete Dream of Electric Sheep"	9 December 2011	N/A
Pete starts dating a new girlfriend, Tilly, who believes that UFOs are of alien origin. All is going well until Pete discovers that Chloe, 'the one that got away', is going out with his nemesis, Jake.

== International broadcast ==
In Australia, series one of this programme commenced airing on ABC2 each Tuesday at 9pm from 18 October 2011. Series two commenced airing on ABC2 each Tuesday at 9pm from 6 March 2012.
