= The One That Got Away (British TV series) =

Welsh television series

- Also known as: Cleddau
- Genre: Crime drama
- Written by: Catherine Tregenna
- Directed by: Sion Ifan
- Starring: Elen Rhys; Richard Harrington; Rhian Blythe; Ioan Hefin; Aled Pugh; Mali Ann Rees; Ian Puleston-Davies
- Country of origin: United Kingdom filmed in Wales
- Original languages: English and Welsh
- No. of series: 2
- No. of episodes: 6

Production
- Executive producers: Ben Bickerton; Phillip Trethowan
- Producer: Mared Swain
- Cinematography: Paul Andrew
- Editor: Dafydd Hunt
- Running time: 50 minutes
- Production company: BlackLight TV
- Budget: Unknown

Original release
- Network: BBC One Wales; BBC Four
- Release: 25 February 2025 – present

The One That Got Away is a British crime drama television series that is an English-language adaptation of the Welsh-language show Cleddau, originally produced for S4C. The series premiered on 25 February 2025 on BBC One Wales. In October 2025, it was renewed for a second series.

The second series is currently on S4C in Welsh. The English version will be on BBC One Wales in the new year.

All of the Welsh-language series and the first series of the English version are available on BBC iPlayer, with the English version of series 2 available in the new year.

== Plot ==
=== Series 1 ===
The murder of student nurse Abby Rayner in the Welsh seaside town of Pembroke Dock bears the hallmarks of a double murder twelve years ago. The original investigative team of DI Ffion Lloyd and DS Rick Sheldon are reunited to help crack the case, but their own personal history, having been previously engaged, threatens to turn both of their worlds upside down.

=== Series 2 ===
The discovery of a woman's body in the Cleddau River leads DI Ffion Lloyd and DS Rick Sheldon to investigate a suspected serial killer who uses online dating platforms to lure women to their deaths. Meanwhile, Ffion attempts to move on with her personal life, while her complicated relationship with Rick continues to affect their partnership.

Series 3

It is unknown is bbc will renew the show for a third series

== Cast and characters ==
- Elen Rhys as DI Ffion Lloyd
- Richard Harrington as DS Rick Sheldon
- Rhian Blythe as Helen Sheldon
- Ioan Hefin as DCI Alan Vaughan
- Aled Pugh as DS Celyn Howells
- Mali Ann Rees as DC Mog 'Moggsy' Morgan
- Ian Puleston-Davies as Paul Harvey
- William Thomas as Griff Lloyd
- Sharon Morgan as Delyth Lloyd
- Hannah Daniel as Lisa Redwood
- Eiry Thomas as Anna Harvey
- Gwidion Rhys as Rhys Moss
- Matthew Aubrey as Mel Owen
- Sion Alun Davies as Jamie Tilston
- Sule Rimi as Alex Hinton

== Production ==
The series is produced by BlackLight TV and written by Catherine Tregenna, with a cast led by Richard Harrington and Elen Rhys and also including Rhian Blythe. It is the English-language rendition of Welsh-language drama Cleddau, an original series for Welsh language broadcaster S4C and is set and shot in Pembroke Dock.

An all-Welsh cast also includes Sule Rimi, Ian Puleston-Davies, Ioan Hefin, Aled Pugh, Mali Ann Rees, Will Thomas, Sharon Morgan and Hannah Daniel.

The first series was shot between November 2023 and April 2024, with the Welsh and English language versions made back to back.

== Broadcast ==
The series was made available on BBC iPlayer from 25 February 2025, with the subsequent broadcast on BBC Cymru Wales and BBC Four.

== Reception ==
Writing in The Guardian, The One That Got Away was given four stars by Lucy Mangan who said the series "is a rare double delight – something not just better than you were expecting, but better than it needs to be." She described it as a "smartly plotted thriller" which "provides an astute portrait of complicated adults with complicated relationships that holds the attention no less than the twisty narrative".

== Accolades ==
It received four nominations at the BAFTA Cymru Awards in 2025, including Best Actress for Elen Rhys, and for Sound, Editing, and Breakthrough; for producer Mared Swain.
