= Ordinary Lies =

- Genre: Drama
- Created by: Danny Brocklehurst
- Written by: Danny Brocklehurst
- Directed by: John McKay; Juliet May; Misha Manson-Smith; Jon Wright
- Starring: Jo Joyner; Michelle Keegan; Max Beesley; Jason Manford; Mackenzie Crook; Sally Lindsay; Shazad Latif; Con O'Neill; Angela Griffin; Kimberley Nixon; Joel Fry; Rebekah Staton; Matt Di Angelo; Luke Bailey
- Country of origin: United Kingdom
- Original language: English
- No. of series: 2
- No. of episodes: 12

Production
- Executive producer: Nicola Shindler
- Producer: Tom Sherry
- Production location: The London Studios Warrington
- Running time: 60 minutes
- Production company: Red Production Company

Original release
- Network: BBC One; BBC One HD
- Release: 17 March 2015 – 22 November 2016

Ordinary Lies is a British television drama series that was first broadcast on BBC One on 17 March 2015. The six-part first series, written by Danny Brocklehurst, is set in a car showroom. The second, also in six-parts, is set in the warehouse of a sports goods company based in Wales. The series executive producer is Nicola Shindler. The series was commissioned by Charlotte Moore for the BBC. In Australia, the series premiered on BBC First from 25 July 2015.

== Plot ==
=== Series 1 ===
JS Motors, a car dealership in Warrington, employs a number of 'ordinary' people, each with dark secrets. As each episode unravels, it becomes clear how quickly lies can escalate with shocking consequences.

=== Series 2 ===
Coopers Outdoors, a Sports Goods Company based in Cardiff, has a number of workers who each hold a dark secret.

== Cast ==
=== Main cast ===
==== Series 1 (2015) ====
- Max Beesley as Mike Hill, co-owner and boss of the company, who is having an affair with Beth
- Jo Joyner as Beth Corbin, deputy manager, whose husband has been missing for a year
- Michelle Keegan as Tracy Shawcross, a receptionist who becomes involved with drug trafficking
- Sally Lindsay as Kathy Kavanagh, Mike's secretary who becomes dissatisfied at her husband's inability to have sex
- Shazad Latif as Rick Ahmed, a mechanic who has sex with Mike's 15-year-old daughter, Ruby (episodes 1—4)
- Jason Manford as Marty McLean, a down on his luck salesman who lies that his wife has died to keep his job
- Mackenzie Crook as Pete Blythman, a company salesman and former gambler

==== Series 2 (2016) ====
- Matt Di Angelo as Robert 'Fletch' Fletcher, a warehouse picker who finds his happy marriage threatened when he reunites with his father
- Kimberley Nixon as Holly Pryce, Jenna's PA and Neil's girlfriend, who believes everyone lives a more interesting life than she does
- Rebekah Staton as Wendy Walker, a forklift driver whose life is turned upside down when her former, abusive girlfriend returns
- Angela Griffin as Jenna Moss, general manager, who oversees both the warehouse and sales floors
- Joel Fry as Billy 'Toke' Tokington, warehouse manager who becomes a crime-fighting superhero at night
- Con O'Neill as Joe Brierley, Head of Sales who believes his wife is cheating on him and goes to great lengths to prove it
- Luke Bailey as Ash Driscoll, Coopers' new recruit who embarks on a toxic relationship with recent divorcee Ally
- Jennifer Nicholas as Ally, newly divorced call centre worker who catches the eye of Ash

=== Supporting cast ===
==== Series 1 (2015) ====
- George Bukhari as Fat Jason, a salesman who struggles with his weight
- Rebecca Callard as Grace, a young, lonely accountant who has a fling with Marty
- Belinda Stewart-Wilson as Alison Hill, Mike's estranged wife
- Manjinder Virk as Marianne Morton, a receptionist who had an affair with Beth's husband
- Fisayo Akinade as Ziggy, a mechanic who works with Rick in the workshop
- Cat Simmons as Emma, a company accountant and bride-to-be, engaged to Jez
- Kris Mochrie as Jez, Emma's fiancé
- Cherrelle Skeete as Viv Baxter, a receptionist who becomes involved with drug trafficking (episodes 1—2)
- Erin Shanagher as Katriana McLean, Marty's ailed wife, who he claims to be dead (episode 1)
- Tony Maudsley as Ralf Kavanagh, Kathy's husband (episode 3)
- Edward MacLiam as Niall, Kathy's sex buddy (episode 3)
- Holly Earl as Ruby Hill, Mike's 15-year-old daughter who becomes involved with Rick (episode 4)
- Ellie Haddington as Gina Corbin, Beth's mother-in-law and Dave's mother (episodes 5—6)
- Shaun Dooley as Dave Corbin, Beth's estranged husband (episode 6)

==== Series 2 (2016) ====
- Jill Halfpenny as Belinda Brierley, Joe's wife, whom he believes is cheating on him (episode 1)
- Griff Rhys Jones as Patrick, Fletch's father, whom Fletch believes walked out on him as a child (episode 5)
- Elen Rhys as Caz, Fletch's wife, who reignites the relationship between Fletch and his father
- Gareth Pierce as Karl Shelvey, a call centre worker who is best friends with Ray
- Noel Sullivan as Neil, forklift driver and Holly's current boyfriend
- Ian Davies as Ray, a call centre worker who is best friends with Karl
- Ella Peel as Chrissy, a young girl whom Toke takes into his care (Episode 3)
- Elinor Crawley as Sarah-Jane, a PA appointed by Jenna following Holly's departure
- Aled Pugh as Lenny, a warehouse picker who is connected to a local gang of thugs (episode 4)

== Episodes ==
=== Series 1 (2015) ===
No. overall	No. in series	Title	Directed by	Written by	Original release date	UK viewers (millions)
1	1	"Marty's Story"	John McKay	Danny Brocklehurst	17 March 2015	6.34
Salesman Marty (Jason Manford) is in trouble with company boss Mike (Max Beesley) for repeatedly arriving late for work. In order to escape being sacked, he tells a shocking lie - that his ill wife has died. Secretary Kathy (Sally Lindsay) homes in on his lie, but not before he has cheated with accountant Grace (Rebecca Callard). Meanwhile, Mike wants to embark on a future with the deputy manager Beth (Jo Joyner), but she is hung up on her husband, who has been inexplicably missing for a year.
2	2	"Tracy's Story"	John McKay	Danny Brocklehurst	24 March 2015	6.90
Receptionists Tracy (Michelle Keegan) and Viv (Cherrelle Skeete) tell everyone at work that they are both going to Ibiza on holiday, when actually they are actually running an errand for Tracy's boyfriend Jimmy. When they discover that the errand involves heading to the Dominican Republic to smuggle drugs back into the country, the pair immediately try to back out, but Jimmy isn't having any of it. Whilst Tracy makes it back without being caught, Viv is arrested by local customs officials.
3	3	"Kathy's Story"	Juliet May	Danny Brocklehurst	31 March 2015	6.31
Secretary Kathy (Sally Lindsay) is tired of husband Ralf (Tony Maudsley) being unable to have sex, and decides to seek a partner to do it with after years of being celibate. After getting involved with Niall, (Edward MacLiam), she believes she has found the answer to all of her problems, until things start to escalate. When Kathy witnesses an attack whilst with Niall, she is forced to battle with her conscience. Does she tell the police, or does she keep her affair a secret from her husband?
4	4	"Rick's Story"	Juliet May	Danny Brocklehurst	7 April 2015	6.19
Mechanic Rick (Shazad Latif) is suffering from marital problems. Mike allows him to stay as a guest in his spare room until he can get himself back on his feet, but Rick soon finds himself becoming too involved with Mike's 15-year-old daughter, Ruby (Holly Earl). Rick struggles to understand his feelings towards the immature Ruby. Though he is fully aware that legally she is a child, with her consent, he takes her virginity - but soon comes to realise exactly what he has done.
5	5	"Pete's Story"	John McKay	Danny Brocklehurst	14 April 2015	6.41
Salesman Pete (Mackenzie Crook) is left to face the consequences when a woman with whom he had an affair, as well as her new partner, Lloyd (Darren Connelly), begin to demand money from him in order for him to see his illegitimate son. Pete organises a sting in which two of the most expensive cars on the company forecourt are hijacked during a test drive, but his actions come close to being exposed by Mike. Meanwhile, Jason (George Bukhari) reveals the truth about his relationship with his girlfriend.
6	6	"Beth's Story"	John McKay	Danny Brocklehurst	21 April 2015	6.35
Deputy manager Beth (Jo Joyner)'s estranged husband Dave (Shaun Dooley) returns sixteen months after he disappeared, just as she is about to settle into a relationship with Mike. Torn over whether to allow her ex a chance, or form a relationship with her new beau, Beth's life begins to crumble around her. But when the real reasons behind Dave's disappearance start to come to light, Beth is forced to make a promise which she realises that she might not be able to keep.

=== Series 2 (2016) ===
No. overall	No. in series	Title	Directed by	Written by	Original release date	UK viewers (millions)
7	1	"Joe's Story"	Misha Manson-Smith	Danny Brocklehurst	18 October 2016	5.42
Head of Sales Joe Brierley (Con O'Neill) is forced to go home early one day following a workplace related accident. When he arrives home, he finds his wife, Belinda (Jill Halfpenny), acting strangely. Suspecting that she may be playing away, Joe decides to CCTV cameras inside his home. Although he discovers no evidence of an affair, he discovers Belinda is regularly meeting with another woman. When he decides to follow her, he discovers she is involved with something much darker than he ever expected.
8	2	"Holly's Story"	Misha Manson-Smith	Danny Brocklehurst	25 October 2016	5.59
Social media addict Holly Pryce (Kimberley Nixon) makes the most of manager Jenna (Angela Griffin) being away, and decides to spice up her life by reconnecting with her ex-boyfriend, who claims to be recently divorced. Moving into Jenna's empty flat, and taking her place at a charity dinner at a swanky hotel, Holly finally believes she is living the life she has always wanted. But when she discovers her new beau is playing away, and she accidentally kills Jenna's cat, her dream lifestyle begins to crumble around her.
9	3	"Toke's Story"	Jon Wright	Danny Brocklehurst	1 November 2016	4.55
Warehouse manager Toke (Joel Fry) likes to dress up as a superhero, Rain Town Knight, in his spare time. When out patrolling the streets one night, he comes across a young girl named Chrissy, while she is being stabbed. He takes her to A&E, and the pair strike up a friendship. In order to get Chrissy off the streets, he allows her to sleep in his camper van. As the pair continue to bond, he inadvertently becomes involved in Chrissy's bid to gain access to her young son, who is in the care of her stepfather and his girlfriend.
10	4	"Wendy's Story"	Misha Manson-Smith	Danny Brocklehurst	8 November 2016	4.98
Forklift driver Wendy (Rebekah Staton)'s relationship with her girlfriend Katya is rocked when her ex, Nina, begins to target them with a campaign of harassment. Wendy decides to warn Nina off, but she responds by posting revenge porn online. Wendy realises that the only way to end Nina's torment is to fight fire with fire. She concocts a plan with work colleague Lenny to pay a group of thugs £5,000 to scare Nina. But when Nina is nearly killed in a hit and run, Wendy realises her plan has gone horribly wrong.
11	5	"Fletch's Story"	Jon Wright	Danny Brocklehurst	15 November 2016	4.55
Office couple Fletch (Matt Di Angelo) and Caz (Elen Rhys) are happily married, but their marriage is rocked when Caz contacts Fletch's absent father Patrick (Griff Rhys Jones) without his consent. When Patrick rejects Fletch in favour of his other family, he goes into a destructive downward spiral, leaving Caz and nearly starting an affair with fellow office worker Sarah-Jane (Elinor Crawley).
12	6	"Jenna's Story"	Jon Wright	Danny Brocklehurst	22 November 2016	4.10
General manager Jenna (Angela Griffin) is rocked when her troublesome sister Lizzie (Judi Shekoni) is released from prison. With her relationship with fiance Jake (Kingsley Ben-Adir) showing cracks after rounds of failed IVF, Jenna succumbs to Lizzie's bad influence and takes drugs on a night out. However, events come back to haunt her when she is arrested for dealing to a boy who had a bad reaction to the drugs. Meanwhile, Ally (Jennifer Nicholas) finally inspires Ash (Luke Bailey) to get help.
