= An Inspector Calls (TV series) =

1982 television film by Michael Simpson

- Created by: J. B. Priestley
- Directed by: Michael Simpson
- Starring: Bernard Hepton as Inspector Goole; Sarah Berger as Sheila Birling; David Sibley as Eric Birling; Simon Ward as Gerald Croft; Nigel Davenport as Arthur Birling; Margaret Tyzack as Sybil Birling; Jean Leppard as Edna
- Country of origin: United Kingdom
- Original language: English
- No. of episodes: 3

Production
- Producer: Ronald Smedley
- Editor: Ian Williams
- Running time: 80 minutes

Original release
- Network: BBC1
- Release: 17 August 1982

In 1982, the BBC broadcast a made-for-television adaptation of An Inspector Calls based on the 1945 J. B. Priestley play of the same title and directed by Michael Simpson. It starred Bernard Hepton as Inspector Goole, with the younger Birlings played by Sarah Berger, and David Sibley as Eric. It also starred Nigel Davenport as Arthur Birling and Margaret Tyzack as Sybil Birling. Simon Ward played Gerald Croft, Sheila's fiancé, and the part of the maid Edna was acted by Jean Leppard.
