= An Inspector Calls =

1945 play by J. B. Priestley

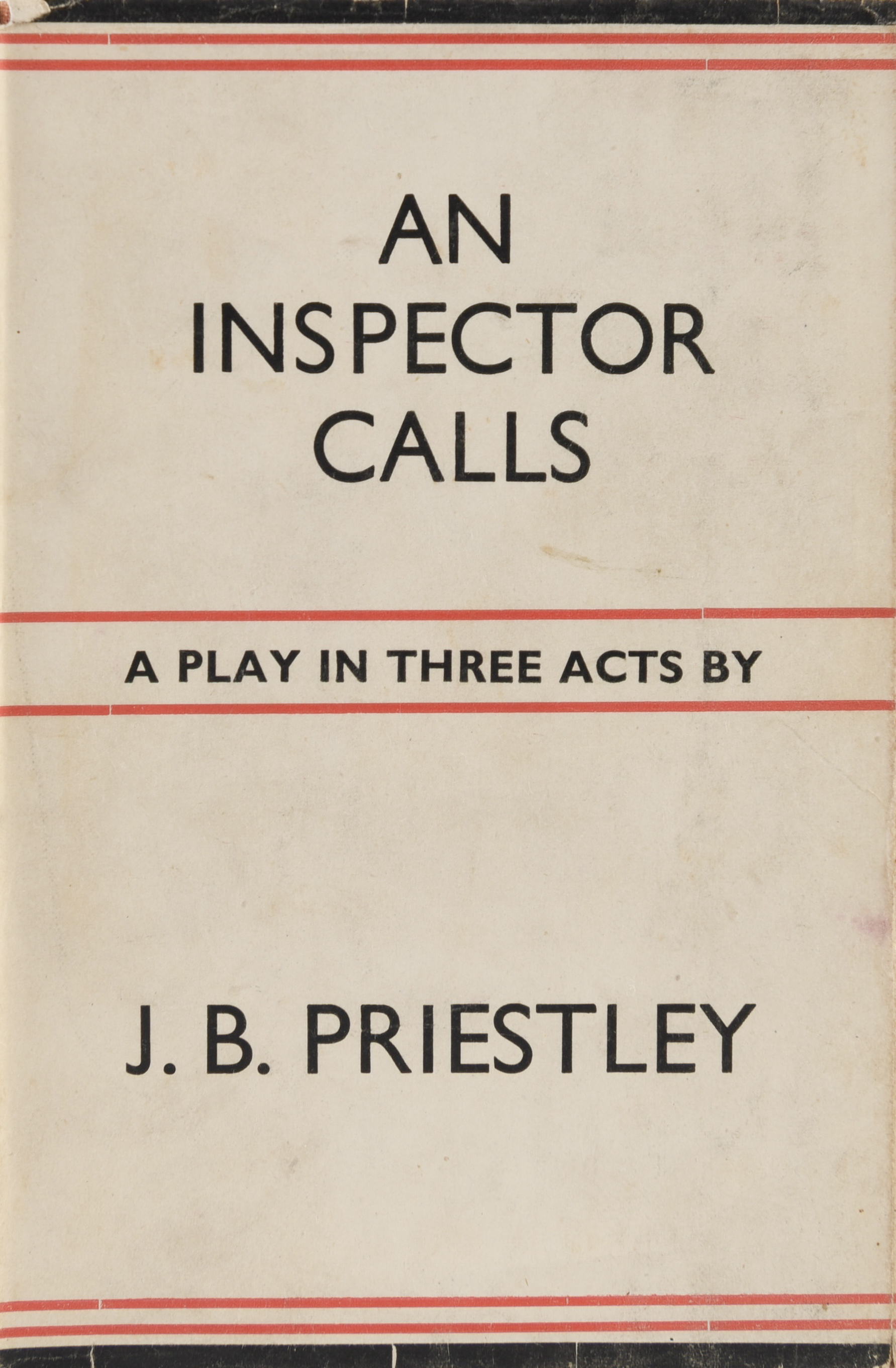
- First edition (1947) with dust jacket
- Original language: English
- Written by: J. B. Priestley
- Genre: Drama
- Setting: Edwardian England

Premiere
- Date: 7 June 1944
- Place: Russia

An Inspector Calls is a modern morality play and drawing room play written by English dramatist J. B. Priestley. It was first performed in the Soviet Union in May 1945 and at the New Theatre in London the following year. It is one of Priestley's best-known works for the stage and is considered to be one of the classics of mid-20th century English theatre. The play's success and reputation were boosted by a successful revival by English director Stephen Daldry for the National Theatre in 1992 and a tour of the UK in 2011–2012.

The play is a three-act drama which takes place on a single night in 1912. The play focuses on the prosperous upper-middle-class Birling family, who live in a comfortable home in the fictional town of Brumley, "an industrial city in the north Midlands." The family is visited by a man calling himself Inspector Goole, who questions the family about the suicide of a working-class woman in her mid-twenties. The play is notable amongst students as many British and international schools study it as a prescribed text for the GCSE and IGCSE English Literature courses.

== Synopsis ==
=== Act 1 ===
The play is set in 1912 at the Birlings' large home in the fictional industrial town of Brumley. Arthur Birling, a wealthy factory owner, magistrate and local politician, celebrates his daughter Sheila's engagement to Gerald Croft, son of a rival magnate. Also present are Birling's wife Sybil and their son Eric (whose drinking problem the family discreetly ignores). After dinner, Sheila and Sybil leave the dining room to go into the drawing room, while Birling lectures the young men on the importance of self-reliance and looking after one's own, and talks of the bright future that awaits them (which, he believes, will include a knighthood for himself in the next honours list).

The evening is interrupted when the maid Edna announces the arrival of a man calling himself Inspector Goole, who explains that earlier that day he had seen the dead body of a young woman named Eva Smith, who had died by drinking disinfectant. He has been given the "duty" of investigating her death and the Birlings' involvement in it. He has seen her diary, which mentions members of the Birling family.

Goole produces a photograph of Smith and shows it to Birling, who confirms that she worked in one of his factories. He reveals he dismissed her for leading a strike action demanding higher wages. Despite acknowledging that he left Smith without a job, Birling denies any responsibility for her death.

Sheila, having been sent by her mother to bring Birling, Eric and Gerald to the drawing room, is shown a photograph of Smith. She explains that once, when she was out shopping with her mother, Sheila saw a dress she liked and tried it on, even though her mother and an assistant thought it was not right for her. Smith, now employed at this shop, also helped with the trying-on. Sheila realised that the dress did not suit her; Smith held the dress against herself, and Sheila could see that it looked much better on her. Seeing Smith smiling at the other assistant, Sheila took umbrage and angrily ordered the manager of the department store to fire her. Sheila's real motivation, which she ashamedly confesses, was the jealousy that she felt towards Smith, perceiving her as prettier than herself. Eric leaves the dining room.

Sybil enters the dining room. The inspector mentions that Smith subsequently used the name Daisy Renton.

=== Act 2 ===
Gerald is noticeably startled and admits to having met a woman named Daisy Renton in the Palace Bar, where Smith had resorted to prostitution to sustain herself. Seeing that Smith was hungry and struggling to cope financially, and was out of place there, Gerald gave her money and arranged for her to move temporarily into a vacant flat belonging to one of his friends. Gerald reveals that he began a relationship with Smith over the summer but parted with her after a few months. Sheila, disheartened, returns her engagement ring to Gerald, who leaves the house, saying he will return.

The inspector turns his attention to Sybil, a patron of a charity that helps women in difficult situations, which Smith, by then pregnant and destitute, had turned to for help, using the name "Mrs. Birling". Sybil, seeing this as a deliberate mockery of herself, convinced the committee to deny her a grant. She argued that Smith had been irresponsible and suggested that she find the father and get him to face his responsibilities; Smith said that she had refused to accept any more money from the father once she knew it had been stolen. Despite vigorous cross-examination from the inspector, Sybil denies any wrongdoing. Goole plays his final card, forcing Sybil to lay the blame on the "drunken young man" who had got Smith pregnant. It slowly dawns on the rest of the family, except Sybil, that Eric is the young man in question, and "Mrs. Birling" was the first name that had come to Smith's mind because he had fathered her child.

=== Act 3 ===
Eric enters, and after brief questioning from Goole, breaks down and admits responsibility for the pregnancy: he had raped Smith after a drinking spree at the Palace Bar. After finding out that Smith was pregnant, Eric stole £50 (equivalent to £4,938 in 2025) from his father's business to support her and their child, but she refused the stolen money and cut contact with Eric. Birling and Sybil are outraged by Eric's behaviour, and the evening dissolves into angry recriminations. The inspector reminds the family that actions have consequences and that all people are intertwined in one society, stating: "if men will not learn that lesson, then they will be taught it in fire and blood and anguish." He leaves.

Birling's greatest worry is the scandal that will arise from Eric's theft of his firm's money, which will come out at the inquest. The family begins to question if "Goole" was a real police inspector. Gerald returns and reveals that he had met a police sergeant he knew, who did not know of any police inspector named Goole. To confirm this, Birling makes a phone call to his friend, the chief constable, who confirms that there is no Inspector Goole on the force. Gerald points out that they could not be sure that Goole had shown the same photograph to the different members of the family; there could have been several young women, and they did not know that any of them had died. Gerald phones the infirmary, and they confirm that no one has died there that day, and they have not had a suicide in months. The family concludes that the inspector was a fraud and that they have been the victims of a hoax.

Gerald and the elder Birlings celebrate in relief, but Eric and Sheila continue to rue their own and the others' actions. The phone rings: it is the police, who tell Birling that a young woman has just died on her way to the infirmary in a suspected suicide, and that a policeman is on his way to question the family.

== Characters ==
=== Eva Smith/Daisy Renton ===
The deceased young woman who represents the working class in a capitalist society. She is described as young and pretty, with dark eyes. Her parents were dead, and she had no one to turn to when she was unable to support herself through honest employment.

=== Inspector Goole ===
Apparently a police inspector, sent to investigate a suicide. He seems to be familiar with every detail of the case already, interrogating the family solely to expose their guilt rather than to discover unknown information. It is suggested in the final scene that a real investigation will follow Goole's, and his purpose has been to warn the family in advance and encourage them to accept responsibility for their wrongdoing. The inspector is the drive for Priestley's socialist views within the play.

=== Arthur Birling ===
Arthur Birling is "a heavy-looking, rather portentous man in his middle fifties". He represents the ruling capitalist class, repeatedly describing himself with pride as a "hard-headed businessman", and is arguably the main subject of Priestley's social critique. Dominant, arrogant, self-centred, and morally blind, he shows his stubbornness by refusing to take any responsibility for Eva's death. He remains unaffected by the suicide, and his concerns appear to be the avoidance of public scandal, the recovery of the money Eric stole from the company, and the resumption of Sheila and Gerald's engagement, which promises to effect a Croft–Birling merger (which looks likely to bring about a monopoly). Arthur Birling is used by Priestley as a dramatic vehicle to criticise capitalism, the arrogance of the wealthy middle class, and the ignorance of the older generation.

=== Sybil Birling ===
Mrs Birling, "a rather cold woman" of about fifty, is Arthur's wife, from a higher social class than his. As the leader of a charitable organisation, she assumes a social and moral superiority over Inspector Goole, whose questioning style she frequently describes as "impertinent" and "offensive". Like her husband, she refuses to accept responsibility for the death of Eva Smith and is more concerned with maintaining the family's reputation, even going so far as to lie and deny that she recognises Smith's picture. She derides women like Eva as immoral, dishonest, and greedy.

=== Sheila Birling ===
Sheila Birling is the daughter of Arthur and Sybil Birling, and the older sister of Eric. Sheila begins as a naive and self-centred young woman, but becomes the most sympathetic member of the group over the course of the play, revealing insecurity about her appearance, showing remorse for her part in Eva's downfall, and encouraging her family to do the same. By the play's end her social conscience has been awakened and she has a new awareness of her responsibilities to others. She represents the younger generation's break from the selfish behaviour and capitalist views of its elders. Sheila shows her naivety and lack of maturity in the way she reacts to her father. She is quick to apologise, it is clear that she is keen to behave well. She also refers to her father as 'Daddy', a childish term. As the play progresses, Sheila's character develops and she begins to stand up for herself.

=== Eric Birling ===
Eric Birling is the son of Arthur and Sybil Birling and the younger brother of Sheila. Eric is presented as a "Jack the Lad" character with a drinking habit, who raped Eva and made her pregnant. He is distanced from the rest of the family and feels he cannot talk to them about his problems. With his sister, he repents of, and accepts responsibility for, the way he treated Eva.

=== Gerald Croft ===
The son of Sir George and Lady Croft of Crofts Limited, a friendly competitor of Birling and Company, and the fiancé of Sheila. The revelation of Gerald's affair with Eva puts an end to the engagement, though Sheila commends him for his truthfulness and for his initial compassion towards Smith.

=== Edna ===
Edna is the maid for the Birling family. She introduces the Inspector into the dining room in Act 1.

== Productions ==
An Inspector Calls was first performed in 1945 in two Russian theatres (Moscow's Kamerny Theatre and Leningrad's Comedy Theatre), as a suitable British venue could not be found. Priestley had written the play in a single week and all Britain's theatres had already been booked for the season. The play had its first British production in 1946 at the New Theatre in London with Ralph Richardson as Inspector Goole, Harry Andrews as Gerald Croft, Margaret Leighton as Sheila Birling, Julien Mitchell as Arthur Birling, Marian Spencer as Sybil Birling and Alec Guinness as Eric Birling.

The first Broadway production opened at the Booth Theatre on 21 October 1947 and ran for 95 performances until 10 January 1948. The production was staged by Cedric Hardwicke and produced by Courtney Burr and Lassor H. Grosberg. The cast included Melville Cooper as Arthur Birling, John Buckmaster as Gerald Croft, Rene Ray as Sheila Birling, Doris Lloyd as Sybil Birling, Patricia Marmont as Edna, John Merivale as Eric Birling and Thomas Mitchell as Inspector Goole.

The play was produced and performed at the Ferdowsi Theatre in Iran in the late 1940s, based on the translation by Bozorg Alavi. It was staged in the first season of the Edinburgh Gateway Company in 1953.

In 1986 Richard Wilson directed a production at the Royal Exchange, Manchester, with Geraldine Alexander as Sheila Birling, Hugh Grant as Eric Birling and Graeme Garden as Inspector Goole.

Tom Baker played Inspector Goole in a 1987 production directed by Peter Dews and designed by Daphne Dare that opened at Theatr Clwyd on 14 April then transferred to London's Westminster Theatre on 13 May 1987. The cast included Pauline Jameson as Sybil Birling, Peter Baldwin as Arthur Birling, Charlotte Attenborough as Sheila Birling, Simon Shepherd as Gerald Croft and Adam Godley as Eric Birling.

A revival of the play by British director Stephen Daldry (produced by PW Productions) opened at the National Theatre's Lyttelton Theatre in September 1992. Daldry's concept was to reference two eras: the 1945 post-war era, when the play was written, and the ostensible historical setting for the work in pre-war 1912; this emphasised the way the character Goole was observing, and deploring, the Birling family's behaviour from Priestley's own cultural viewpoint. It won the Drama Desk Award for Outstanding Revival of a Play, and was widely praised for making the work involving and politically relevant for a modern audience. The production is often credited with single-handedly rediscovering Priestley's works and "rescuing" him from the reputation of being obsolete and class-bound, although the production had some detractors, including Sheridan Morley, who regarded it as a gimmicky travesty of the author's patent intentions. The success of the production since 1992 has led to a critical reappraisal of Priestley as a politically engaged playwright who offered a sustained critique of the hypocrisy of English society. A Broadway transfer of the production starring Philip Bosco opened at the Royale Theatre (now the Bernard Jacobs Theatre) on 27 April 1994 and played 454 performances.

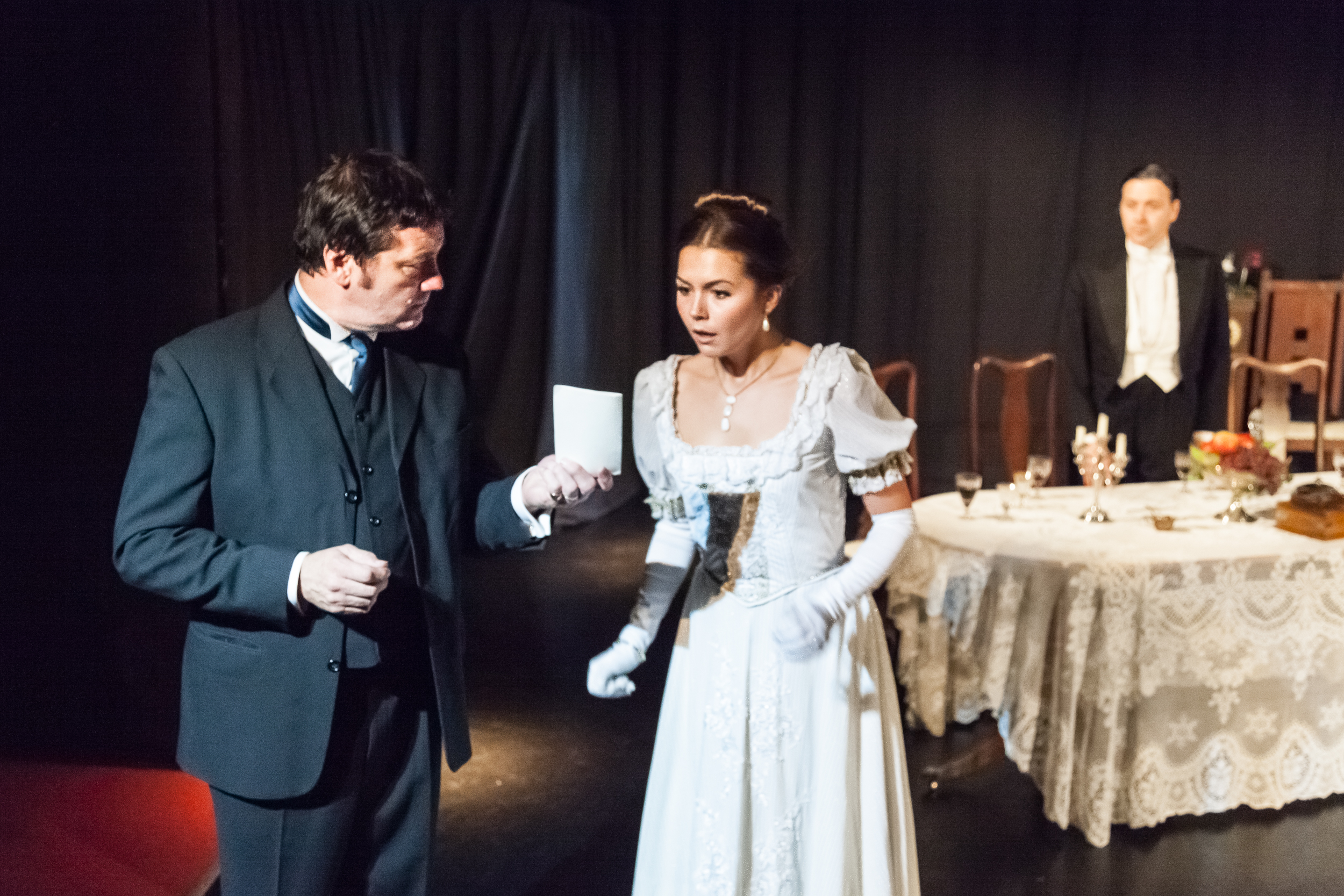
Sheila recognises a picture of Eva presented by the Inspector, as Gerald looks on. A 2012 production by OVO theatre company, St Albans

The Stephen Daldry production went on a tour of the UK in 2011 and continued to tour into 2020, with Tom Mannion and Liam Brennan among the actors playing Inspector Goole. The production returned to the Playhouse in London's West End in November 2016, with Liam Brennan in the name part. Brennan once again starred as Inspector Goole in a 2022 tour of the UK billed as the production's Thirtieth Anniversary Tour.

Another production opened on 25 October 1995 at the Garrick Theatre and ran for six years until its transfer to the Playhouse Theatre in 2001. In 2009 it reopened at the Novello Theatre for a year-long run, followed by another transfer to Wyndham's Theatre in December 2009, running for only four months.

== Adaptations ==
The play has been adapted to film or television at least eleven times, including:

- 1948 British television play, produced by Harold Clayton
- 1954 British film, directed by Guy Hamilton
- 1965 Bengali film, Thana Theke Aschi, directed by Hiren Nag
- 1973 Soviet film, He came, directed by A. Proshkin and L. Ishimbaeva
- 1979 Soviet film, Inspektor Gull, directed by A. Proshkin
- 1983 Swiss film, E Inspäkter chunnt, directed by Bruno Kaspar
- 1982 British television serial, directed by Michael Simpson
- 1998 BBC World Service radio play, starring Bob Peck
- 2010 BBC Radio 4 radio play, starring Toby Jones
- 2010 Bengali film, Thana Theke Aschi, directed by Saron Dutta
- 2015 Hong Kong film, directed by Raymond Wong and Herman Yau
- 2015 British television film, directed by Aisling Walsh
- 2018 British film, directed by Jason Farries

== Awards and nominations ==
=== Awards ===
- 1993 Laurence Olivier Award for Best Revival (also won Best director for Stephen Daldry, Best Set Designer for Ian MacNeil and Best Actress in a Supporting Role for Barbara Leigh-Hunt as Sybil Birling))
- 1994 Drama Desk Award for Outstanding Revival of a Play (also won Outstanding Director of a Play, Outstanding Music in a Play, Outstanding Set Design, Outstanding Lighting Design, Outstanding Special Effects and Outstanding Supporting Actress in a Play (Jane Adams as Sheila Birling))
- 1994 Tony Award for Best Revival of a Play (also won Best Director of a Play, Best Lighting and Best Featured Actress in a Play (Jane Adams))

== Editions ==
- Priestley, J. B. (1947). An Inspector Calls: A Play in Three Acts (First ed.). London: Heinemann. OCLC 59564726.

== See also ==
- Social murder
