= Match of the Day (disambiguation) =

Match of the Day is a football television programme broadcast by the BBC.

Match of the Day may also refer to:

- Match of the Day (American TV series), based on the BBC version
- Match of the Day (novel), a Doctor Who novel
- "Match of the Day" (Man About the House), a 1973 television episode
- "Match of the Day" (Second Thoughts), a 1991 television episode
- "Match of the Day", a song by Genesis from the Spot the Pigeon EP
