= Marianne and Mark =

Novel by Catherine Storr

- First edition
- Author: Catherine Storr
- Language: English
- Genre: Children's novel
- Publisher: Faber and Faber
- Publication date: 1960
- Publication place: United Kingdom
- Preceded by: Marianne Dreams

Marianne and Mark (1960) by Catherine Storr is a sequel to Marianne Dreams (1958). It continues the story of the eponymous characters. The novel has far less basis in fantasy than the first book with Storr focusing on the trials of growing up rather than magical happenings, although there is arguably a fantastic subtext in Marianne and Mark.

== Plot ==
Now aged fifteen Marianne returns to Brighton, where she recuperated from her illness at the end of Marianne Dreams, when she was ten. Much to her disappointment she finds Brighton a lonely and boring place, and she tags along with local girls Alice and Josie despite having little in common with them.

One evening Josie's friend Billie tells the girls of a visit to a local fortune teller who apparently gives remarkably accurate readings. Reluctantly, Marianne joins the girls on a trip to the fortune teller and there she is astonished at how much the woman guesses about her life, including details of her illness five years ago. The fortune teller assures Marianne that she will not be lonely for much longer and that soon she will experience romance.

Spurred on by this Marianne accepts a date with a boy called Alan, whom she doesn't realise is Billie's former boyfriend. This inadvertent betrayal alienates Marianne from the few friends she had, and after Alan also deserts her she is left on her own. It is then that she meets Mark, a boy from London who, it transpires, is the same boy with whom she shared a tutor but never met in Marianne Dreams. The two enjoy the last few days of the holiday together and promise to meet again in London.

== Themes ==
Unlike Marianne Dreams with its magical plot, the sequel focuses on character and emotion. There are however, a number of occasions which could be interpreted as supernatural, especially the fortune teller's knowledge of Marianne and her dream. It is left ambiguous as to whether Mark experienced the events of Marianne Dreams or if they were all only a dream of Marianne's. There are hints that it was more than just a dream as the fortune teller notes that Marianne's previous actions helped Mark, and later Mark takes Marianne to a lighthouse which looks exactly the same as the one from the dream, and he asks her if she remembers it. This could mean that the dream did happen to both of them or he could be simply commenting on the fact that both of them have in fact visited the spot before, in real life.

At a conference on children's literature, one respondent suggested that the novel was realistic rather than fantasy because of the needs of the novel form for older children, and that this is less successful than the earlier book. Storr's response was:

Perhaps this didn't come off as well. … I wrote that because I'd always wanted to write on the Macbeth theme – if you are told that something is going to happen to you, you make it happen. That was what the book was supposed to be about and there is a very good example of using fantasy.

== Setting ==
Most of the settings in the novel are real places in Brighton and Eastbourne including: the West Pier and the Palace Pier, West Street, North Street and East Street (an area known as The Lanes), Brighton Station, Beachy Head and Belle Tout Lighthouse.
