= Andrew Lowe Watson =

English composer

Andrew Lowe Watson (17 January 1958 - 25 April 2021) was an English composer for musical theatre and concert music. In 2002, along with author Catherine Storr, he wrote an opera based on the children's fantasy novel Marianne Dreams. It premiered in London in June 2004. He was a student of Norma Fisher.

His eight musicals, commissioned by the Brüder-Grimm-Märchenfestspiele in Hanau, Germany, and based on the Tales of the Brothers Grimm, have been performed in Germany and Japan.
