= I Could Be So Good for You =

I Could Be So Good for You may refer to:

- "I Could Be So Good for You", the theme tune to the TV series Minder later released as a single
- "I Could Be So Good for You", a song on the Kenny Rogers album Love or Something Like It
