= Match of the Seventies =

- Genre: Sports
- Directed by: Danny Fenton & Chris Kelly
- Starring: Dennis Waterman
- Narrated by: Dennis Waterman
- Opening theme: 20th Century Boy
- Country of origin: United Kingdom
- Original language: English
- No. of series: 2
- No. of episodes: 11

Production
- Executive producer: Tony Moss
- Producer: Chris Kelly
- Running time: 40 minutes
- Production company: BBC

Original release
- Network: BBC1
- Release: 26 July 1995 – 2 September 1996

Match of the Seventies is a British sports documentary television series broadcast on BBC1 in two series between 26 July 1995 and 2 September 1996. Presented by Dennis Waterman it featured highlights of the English football seasons during the 1970s. It begins in the summer of 1970, shortly after England's defeat in the World Cup in a season in which Arsenal won the double and concludes at the end of the 1979-1980 season with an increasingly dominant Liverpool side retaining their league title.

Each episode featured a string of pop and rock songs which were released around the same time as the footballing events which were being recalled.

The series was able to utilise the BBC's Match of the Day archives. It was part of the growing boom in nostalgia for the decade. Waterman, a football fan, had become a television star during the decade in The Sweeney and remained closely associated with that era. It was subsequently followed by Match of the Eighties, presented by Danny Baker, which for legal reasons did not cover the whole decade.

== Production ==
The series could not include certain matches because no footage was available.

== Episodes ==
=== Series 1 ===
This series was broadcast on Wednesdays. This series has six episodes:

- Episode 1: 26 July 1995. This episode covers the 1970–71 season.
- Episode 2: 2 August 1995. This episode covers the 1971–72 season.
- Episode 3: 9 August 1995. This episode covers the 1972–73 season.
- Episode 4: 16 August 1995. This episode covers the 1973–74 season.
- Episode 5: 23 August 1995. This episode covers the 1974–75 season.
- Episode 6: 30 August 1995. This episode covers the 1975–76 season.

=== Series 2 ===
This series was broadcast on Mondays. This series has five episodes:

- Episode 1: 5 August 1996. This episode covers the 1976–77 season.
- Episode 2: 12 August 1996. This episode covers the 1977–78 season.
- Episode 3: 19 August 1996. This episode covers the 1978–79 season.
- Episode 4: 26 August 1996. This episode covers the 1979–80 season.
- Episode 5: 2 September 1996. The title of this episode is Greatest Hits.

== Reception ==
Jim White said that Match of the Seventies is "superb".

Journalists watching the series noticed the players' sideburns.

== Match of the Eighties ==
Match of the Eighties covers English football between the summer of 1980 and the summer of 1986, supplemented by television comedy broadcast, and recorded music released, between those dates. The series has six episodes:

- Episode 1: 21 July 1997. This episode covers the 1980–81 season.
- Episode 2: 28 July 1997. This episode covers the 1981–82 season.
- Episode 3: 4 August 1997. This episode covers the 1982–83 season.
- Episode 4: 11 August 1997. This episode covers the 1983–84 season.
- Episode 5: 18 August 1997. This episode covers the 1984–85 season.
- Episode 6: 25 August 1997. This episode covers the 1985–86 season, including the Heysel Stadium disaster.

David Prentice called this series "outstanding". This series was followed by Match of the Nineties.

== Match of the Nineties ==
Match of the Nineties was broadcast in 1999, and covers English football between the summer of 1989 and the summer of 1999. This series was presented by Mark Radcliffe and Marc Riley, and has ten episodes:

- Episode 1: 30 July 1999. This episode covers the 1989–90 season.
- Episode 2: 6 August 1999. This episode covers the 1990–91 season.
- Episode 3: 13 August 1999. This episode covers the 1991–92 season.
- Episode 4: 20 August 1999. This episode covers the 1992–93 season.
- Episode 5: 26 August 1999. This episode covers the 1993–94 season.
- Episode 6: 2 September 1999. This episode covers the 1994–95 season.
- Episode 7: 9 September 1999. This episode covers the 1995–96 season.
- Episode 8: 16 September 1999. This episode covers the 1996–97 season.
- Episode 9: 20 September 1999. This episode covers the 1997–98 season.
- Episode 10: 27 September 1999. This episode covers the 1998–99 season.
