= Marianne Dreams =

1958 novel by Catherine Storr

- First edition
- Author: Catherine Storr
- Illustrator: Marjorie-Ann Watts
- Cover artist: Watts
- Genre: Children's, fantasy novel
- Publisher: Faber and Faber
- Publication date: 1958
- Publication place: United Kingdom
- Media type: Print (hardcover)
- Pages: 191; 203 (1964)
- OCLC: 20180027
- LC Class: PZ7.S8857 Mar2 (revised ed., Puffin Books, 1964)
- Followed by: Marianne and Mark

Marianne Dreams is a children's fantasy novel by Catherine Storr. It was illustrated with drawings by Marjorie-Ann Watts and published by Faber and Faber in 1958. The first paperback edition, from Puffin Books in 1964, is catalogued by the Library of Congress as revised.

== Plot introduction ==
Marianne is a young girl who is bedridden with a long-term illness. She draws a picture to fill her time and finds that she spends her dreams within the picture she has drawn. As time goes by, she becomes sicker, and starts to spend more and more time trapped within her fantasy world, and her attempts to make things better by adding to and crossing out things in the drawing make things progressively worse. Her only companion in her dreamworld is a boy called Mark, who is also a long-term invalid in the real world.

Catherine Storr's later novel Marianne and Mark was a sequel to Marianne Dreams.

== Reception ==
John Rowe Townsend commented, "Marianne Dreams is strong stuff for children of the fairly low age-group (about nine to twelve) for which I have seen it suggested. But I would not say it is unsuitable. The realization that we all have power for evil must come some time, and could take far more disturbing forms than this."

== Film, television and theatrical adaptations ==
Marianne Dreams has been the basis of several film, TV and radio adaptations, including the 1972 British ITV children's TV series Escape Into Night (which was quite faithful to the novel), and the movie Paperhouse (which was less so). The author adapted it herself as an opera libretto in 1999: the first performance of the opera Marianne Dreams took place in 2004 with music by the British composer Andrew Lowe Watson. Will Tuckett directed a new adaptation by Moira Buffini at the Almeida Theatre in December 2007.
