= Paperhouse (film) =

1988 film by Bernard Rose

- Film poster
- Directed by: Bernard Rose
- Written by: Matthew Jacobs
- Based on: Marianne Dreams by Catherine Storr
- Produced by: Tim Bevan; Sarah Radclyffe; Jane Frazer; Dan Ireland; M.J. Peckos
- Starring: Charlotte Burke; Ben Cross; Glenne Headly; Elliott Spiers
- Cinematography: Mike Southon
- Edited by: Dan Rae
- Music by: Stanley Myers; Hans Zimmer
- Production company: Working Title Films
- Distributed by: Vestron Pictures
- Release dates: September 10, 1988 (Toronto International Film Festival); June 2, 1989 (United Kingdom)
- Running time: 92 minutes
- Country: United Kingdom
- Language: English
- Budget: $1.6-2 million
- Box office: $241,278

Paperhouse is a 1988 British dark fantasy film directed by Bernard Rose. It was based on the 1958 novel Marianne Dreams by Catherine Storr. The film stars Ben Cross, Glenne Headly and Gemma Jones. The original novel was the basis of a British TV series for children titled Escape Into Night.

== Plot ==
While suffering from glandular fever, 11-year-old Anna Madden draws a house. When she falls asleep, Anna has disturbing dreams in which she finds herself inside the house she has drawn. After she draws a face at the window, in her next dream Anna finds Marc, a boy who suffers with muscular dystrophy, living in the house. Anna learns from her doctor that Marc is a real person, and she later visits the house in her dreams several times, each time adding new things to her drawing which also appear in her dream. First Anna draws stairs so that she can go up and visit Marc, then adding more items to his room and a fruit tree to the front yard. In the real world, Anna's relationship with her mother is strained by Anna's lying, as well as the lingering pain she feels from her father's long absences for work and his alcoholism.

Anna sketches her father into the drawing so that he can help carry Marc away, but inadvertently gives him an angry expression which she then crosses out, and the father appears in the dream as a furious, blinded figure with scratch marks over his eyes. After hiding in a closet with Marc, he suggests Anna lie down and mimic the motions she would use to grab the drawing in real life and tear the part of the drawing containing her father out. Anna does so, barely avoiding lighting the paper on fire, and tears her father out of the drawing in her sleep. This does not work, and her father breaks into the closet and carries Anna away before beating her in the chest repeatedly while shouting "Do you know who I am?" at her. Marc musters the strength to attack Anna's father with a hammer, destroying him. Anna wakes up in the hospital, her health having taken a serious turn in her sleep. It is implied that her dream father's attack was mimicking the actions of the ambulance staff administering a heart massage. Anna's doctor tells her that Marc is 'getting better' but Anna sees through her deception, saying that she knows Marc is dying. The doctor is skeptical of Anna's knowledge, but she provides information she could not have known otherwise. Anna asks for her drawing supplies to be brought to the hospital.

While Anna recovers in the hospital, her father returns with her mother to discuss going away on holiday, though Anna is not receptive to her father or the idea of a holiday. Anna draws a new room for Marc with nicer accommodations, and adds a pencil so that they could add anything they needed while in their dream. When she falls asleep, Anna finds Marc at the lighthouse, seemingly cured of his paralysis and in much better spirits. They spend time together playing on a nearby hill and share a first kiss. Soon after, they discuss drawing a ladder to get down from the cliff to the shore. Marc instead suggests that Anna draw a helicopter, which she declines, saying she doesn't know how. Marc says he can, but insists that he must do it alone in the lighthouse. Anna reluctantly agrees, and Marc enters the lighthouse as Anna tells him "Don't go without me." Anna soon wakes from her dream without finding out if Marc had drawn the helicopter.

Anna is discharged from the hospital soon after. Her father reveals to her that he has been given a job in the home office and will not have to go away any more, though Anna still acts coldly towards him. Her father tells her that Anna's doctor said that Marc has passed away. Anna says she already knew. The family goes away on a holiday to the seaside, where Anna is still saddened over Marc's death, though her relationship with her father improves somewhat. After father opens the window in her hotel room, Anna sees the lighthouse from her dream on a nearby cliff. She runs from the hotel by herself, overjoyed, but when she arrives at the lighthouse and calls for Marc repeatedly she finds the door locked and Marc absent. She sits on the step, upset, but finds a note from Marc under a nearby rock. The note shows him and his helicopter, along with a message saying that he can't wait any longer, but he will come back for her if she waits. Anna runs to the nearby cliff and calls to Marc. A helicopter arrives, dropping a ladder. Anna hears Marc calling for her, but then yelling to be careful and to stay away from the cliff. As Anna reaches for the ladder Marc continues to yell for her to be careful, until the helicopter flies away and Anna's mother grabs before she can fall off the cliff. Anna reconciles her relationship with her parents, having come to terms with Marc's death.

== Cast ==
- Charlotte Burke - Anna Madden
- Ben Cross - Dad
- Glenne Headly - Kate Madden
- Elliott Spiers - Marc
- Gemma Jones - Dr. Sarah Nichols
- Jane Bertish - Miss Vanstone
- Samantha Cahill - Sharon
- Sarah Newbold - Karen

== Production ==
On the advice of his ex-wife, Bernard Rose read the novel Marianne Dreams by Catherine Storr and loved the central concept of a girl creating a dreamworld out of a drawing and continually changing the boundaries by additional sketching. As the threat in the book came from abstract phallic shaped stones, Rose changed the threat to a man with a hammer as he felt it was psychologically the same and allowed the film to be heavier and more adult as a result. After failing to find financial backing for the film in his native Britain, Rose ultimately found financial support for the film from Vestron Pictures who backed it on the condition it would not receive an R-rating. The film was set up with producer Tim Bevan at Working Title Films who knew Rose through their work on music videos.

== Reception ==
Film critic Roger Ebert gave Paperhouse four stars out of four and called it "a film in which every image has been distilled to the point of almost frightening simplicity" and ended by saying "this is not a movie to be measured and weighed and plumbed, but to be surrendered to."

On the television show Siskel & Ebert, Paperhouse received a "Thumbs Up" from Roger Ebert who commented "I suppose Paperhouse will be classified as a fantasy thriller, but I thought it was a lot more than that. A dream movie that uses images so real and so concrete, they seem more convincing than most real-life dramas." He also commented how effective the soundtrack was. He said that Paperhouse showed that director Bernard Rose was extremely talented. Gene Siskel gave the film a marginal "Thumbs Down", but he agreed that Bernard Rose was very talented and said, "for about two-thirds of the way I was fascinated by this film." He also commented on how well the dream scenes were handled and said, "these seem to be legitimate fears that child might have." He stated that "when the film got more explicit... I thought the film went over-the-top with imagery and I got a little tired of it. Until then, I was fascinated by it."

On the review aggregator website Rotten Tomatoes, 100% of 7 critics' reviews are positive, with an average rating of 8.2/10.

== Home media ==
Paperhouse was initially released on VHS format not long following its theatrical exhibition in the United Kingdom. In the United States, Vestron Video handled releasing it on both VHS and Laserdisc, both in the 1:33.1 aspect ratio.

The film was made available on DVD on 24 September 2001 via Columbia TriStar Home Entertainment in its original widescreen aspect ratio of 1.66:1. Lionsgate Home Entertainment released a re-issue of the film to DVD on 24 September 2007.

In France, the film received its first Blu-ray release from Metropolitan distribution on 2 May 2013 in a Special Edition containing the original English audio and a dubbed French audio, both in DTS-HD Master Audio 2.0, and optional French subtitles. It features an aspect ratio of 1.78:1. This set is now out-of-print. The film was also released on Blu-ray in Germany in a limited "Collector's Edition" via Nameless Video on 8 November 2019. A standard edition Blu-ray set was released in Germany from Tiberius Films on 4 November 2022.

== Tie-in book edition ==
The film's book basis, Marianne Dreams by Catherine Storr, was given a hardcover film tie-in release in 1989, featuring a film still of Charlotte Burke reaching towards a stormy sky with the imaginary house in the background, along with a bottom-corner caption reading, "new major feature film Paperhouse". The release was unusual, as most children's film tie-in books at the time were released as mass-market paperbacks, while publisher Lutterworth Press had opted for a bound hardcover instead. This edition of Storr's book has since fallen out of print.
