= New York, New York (So Good They Named It Twice) =

1978 song by Gerard Kenny

"New York, New York (So Good They Named It Twice)" is a song performed and composed by singer-songwriter Gerard Kenny in 1978. The song is an ode to his hometown and state New York, New York.

Kenny wrote the song about myth versus fact and explains that the city is overall a great place ("It was a really nice night for a good street fight or a robbery / But I always knew in my home town that would never happen to me"). The line "So Good They Named It Twice" is a play on the fact the name of the city and state are both "New York".

"New York, New York" (as it is sometimes simply called) was the first hit for Kenny after a number of non-charting singles in the United States. In 1978, after moving to England, the song was released. Although it only reached number 43 on the UK Singles Chart, it remained on the chart for two months. Shirley Bassey later covered the song, as part of her "New York Medley", along with "Theme from New York, New York".

The song was included on the following albums released by Kenny:

- Made It Through the Rain (1979)
- The Music of Gerard Kenny (1984)
- In Concert (2007)

The song was also parodied in the Beautiful South song "Liar's Bar" in which there was the line "singing: 'whisky, whiskey...so good they named it twice'".

On the 1959 album by George Russell, New York, NY (Decca Records), on the first track, Rodgers and Hart's "Manhattan", vocalist Jon Hendricks says at 0:44 "... a city so nice, they had to name it twice..."
