= Gerard Kenny =

American singer-songwriter

Gerard W. Kenny (born July 8, 1947, New York City, United States) is an American singer-songwriter, based in London, England. In 1981, he received the Ivor Novello Award for Best Television Theme Music for his song "I Could Be So Good for You", the theme tune of the ITV series Minder.

== Career ==
Kenny formed his first band whilst in high school and between then and the early 1970s, he toured the club circuit. In 1968, he landed his first recording contract with Warner Bros. Records, and from that point until 1977 issued a number of singles that failed to break the charts. He also recorded for Buddah and Laurie; one of the singles on the latter titled "Happiest Man" is now collectable, selling for up to £200.

Kenny relocated to London in 1977 and it was not until the following year that he scored his first hit single with "New York, New York (So Good They Named It Twice)" (an ode to his hometown), which spent two months on the UK Singles Chart, with its parent album Made It Through the Rain going top 20 the following year. Another single on the RCA label, "Fantasy", proved to be another chart hit in 1980, which is from Kenny's second album Living on Music, released the same year. The album saw success in the Philippines, and its lead single "Getting to Know Each Other" became a hit on local radio stations and was featured as a soundtrack in several films and TV shows within the country. It was later covered by local artists Ariel Rivera, Xian Lim, Billy Crawford, Sharon Cuneta, DK Tijam and VR Caballero. "Fantasy" was also covered by Regine Velasquez and Joselito Pascual.

Kenny's composition "I Could Be So Good for You" was recorded by Dennis Waterman for the theme tune of the ITV series Minder and became a top 10 hit single in the United Kingdom during 1980. It also gained an Ivor Novello Award for Kenny. In a 2021 interview, he spoke about the composition and reception of the song and how he met Waterman.

In 1983, he began to work with Alan Jay Lerner on a musical adaption of My Man Godfrey, but Lerner died before it could be completed. However, two of the songs the pair had composed for this musical, namely "I've Been Married" and "Some People", later appeared on Kenny's album The Time Between the Time a decade later. Also this year, Kenny worked for Spike Milligan as the musical director for his show Spike Milligan and Friends, which toured across Australia. In 1985, after moving to WEA, Kenny charted in the UK with another theme song, "No Man's Land", from the ITV drama series Widows.

Since then, Kenny has continued to record and release music periodically. His songs have been recorded by Barry Manilow, Johnny Mathis, Perry Como, Jack Jones, Marion Montgomery, Sacha Distel, James Last and Shirley Bassey, who recorded a song that he co-wrote with Lynsey de Paul, called "There's No Place Like London". Other notable songs co-written by Kenny and de Paul include "Just a Little Time", the title track from de Paul's 1994 album and "Take Back Your Heartache" which appeared on Kenny's 1995 album, An Evening with Gerard Kenny Live.

== Selected discography ==
=== Albums ===
- Made It Through the Rain (1979) – UK No. 19
- Living on Music (1980)
- City Living (1981)
- The Music of Gerard Kenny (1984)
- All for a Dream (1984)
- Play Me Some Porter Please (1992)
- The Time Between Time (1994)
- An Evening with Gerard Kenny Live (1995)
- The Best of... The Singles (1998)
- Coming Home (2005)

=== Singles ===
- "Where Are You?" (1967)
- "3 Weeks, 4 Days, 15 Hours" (1967)
- "Leave It to Me" (1968)
- "New York, New York (So Good They Named It Twice)" (1978) - UK No. 43
- "D-D-D-Dancing" (1979)
- "Getting to Know Each Other" (1980)
- "Fantasy" (1980) – UK No. 34
- "The Other Woman, The Other Man" (1984) – UK No. 69
- "No Man's Land" (1985) – UK No. 56
