= Dennis Waterman =

English actor and singer (1948–2022)

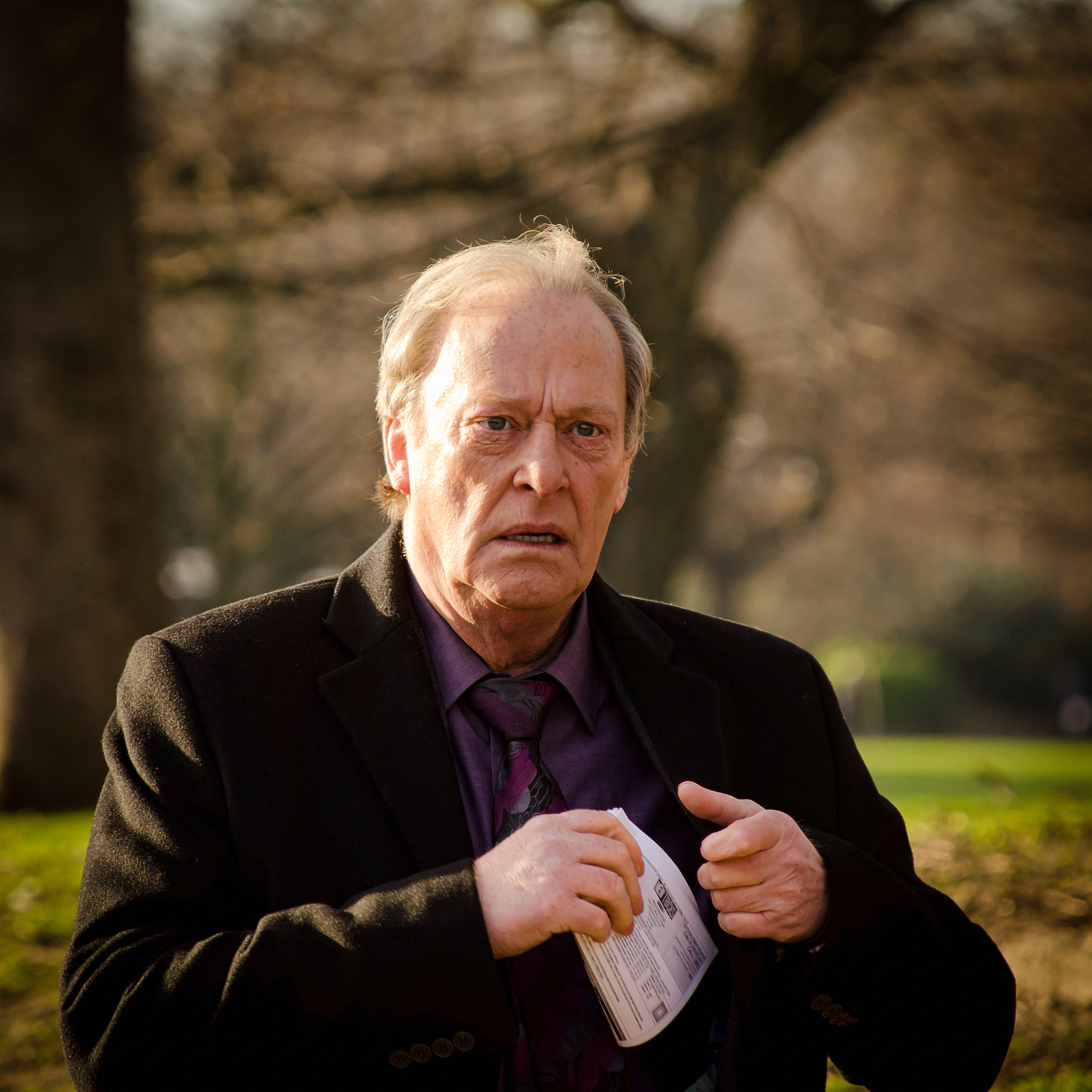
- Waterman in 2012
- Born: 24 February 1948; Clapham, London, England
- Died: 8 May 2022 (aged 74); La Manga, Murcia, Spain
- Occupations: Actor, singer
- Years active: 1960–2020
- Spouses: Penny Dixon (m. 1967; div. 1976); Patricia Maynard (m. 1977; div. 1987); Rula Lenska (m. 1987; div. 1998); Pam Flint (m. 2011)
- Children: 2, including Hannah

Dennis Waterman (24 February 1948 – 8 May 2022) was an English actor and singer. He was best known for his tough-guy leading roles in television series including The Sweeney, Minder and New Tricks, singing the theme tunes of the latter two.

Waterman's acting career spanned 60 years, starting with his childhood roles in film and theatre, and adult roles in film, television and West End theatre. He was known for the range of roles he played, including drama (Up the Junction), horror (Scars of Dracula), adventure (Colditz), comedy (Fair Exchange), comedy-drama (Minder), musical (Windy City) and sport (The World Cup: A Captain's Tale). He appeared in 29 films, the last being released in 2020.

== Early life and education ==
Waterman was born on 24 February 1948, as the youngest of nine children to Rose Juliana (née Saunders) and Harry Frank Waterman in Clapham, south west London. The family, which included siblings Ken, Peter (a welterweight boxing champion), Stella, Norma, and Myrna, lived at 2 Elms Road, Clapham Common South Side. Harry Waterman was a ticket collector for British Railways. Two older sisters, Joy and Vera, had already left home by the time Dennis was born, and another brother, Allen, had died as a young child.

Boxing was a big part of Waterman's childhood. His father had been an amateur boxer and made all of his sons box. His older brother Ken first took Dennis boxing when he was three years old and, when he was ten, Dennis joined Caius Boxing Club.

Waterman was educated at the Granard Primary School, a state primary school on the Ashburton Estate in Putney, south-west London. He failed his Eleven-plus exam, and he went on to attend the Corona Academy, an independent stage school at Ravenscourt Park in Hammersmith, west London.

== Career ==
=== 1960s ===
Waterman's acting career began in childhood. His first role was in Night Train for Inverness (1960) and then Snowball (1960) with Gordon Jackson. He appeared in two small stage roles for the Royal Shakespeare Company's 1960 season in Stratford-upon-Avon In 1961, at the age of 13, he played the part of Winthrop Paroo in the Adelphi Theatre production of The Music Man. A year later, he starred as William Brown in the BBC TV series William based on the Just William books of Richmal Crompton. Waterman played the role of Oliver Twist in the production of the Lionel Bart musical Oliver! staged at the Mermaid Theatre, London, in the early 1960s, and appeared on the cast recording released in 1961. Waterman travelled to Hollywood aged 15, as a series regular in the 1962-63, CBS comedy Fair Exchange, playing teenager Neville Finch. In 1963, he took a "starring" role in the Children's Film Foundation film Go Kart Go. In 1964, Waterman starred as Mike in the Associated-Rediffusion children’s television series, The Barnstormers.

He later appeared in the premiere of Graham Greene's Carving a Statue, produced by Peter Wood, on 17 September 1964 at the Haymarket Theatre, London. Waterman played His Son, with Ralph Richardson as The Father.

Waterman was also in the original cast of Saved, the play written by Edward Bond, and first produced at the Royal Court Theatre in November 1965. He had a major role in the feature film version of Up the Junction (1968) in which he played Peter, boyfriend to Polly (Suzy Kendall).

=== 1970s ===
In the early 1970s, Waterman appeared in the BBC television series Colditz as a young Gestapo officer. He played the brother of a victim of Count Dracula (Christopher Lee) in the Hammer film Scars of Dracula (1970), and the boyfriend of Susan George in Fright (1971). He appeared alongside Richard Harris and John Huston in a Hollywood western, Man in the Wilderness (1971). Waterman appeared in an episode of the BBC2 TV French farce series Ooh La La! (1973), as Camille in Caught in the Act. He was a member of the company of actors who featured in The Sextet (1972), a BBC 2 series which included the Dennis Potter drama Follow the Yellow Brick Road, and Waterman later appeared in the same dramatist's Joe's Ark (Play for Today, 1974). Also in 1974, Waterman appeared in episode 4 of the second series of the comedy programme Man About the House entitled "Did You Ever Meet Rommel?", in which he played a friend of Robin, a German student by the name of Franz Wasserman. Waterman guest starred in a 1974 Special Branch episode entitled "Stand and Deliver".

He became a household name as DS George Carter in The Sweeney during the 1970s. As well as starring as Terry McCann in Minder, from 1979, Waterman sang the theme song, "I Could Be So Good for You", which was a top three UK hit in 1980 and a top ten hit in Australia. It was written by his then-wife Patricia along with Gerard Kenny. Waterman also wrote and recorded a song with George Cole: "What Are We Gonna Get For 'Er Indoors?". Based on their 'Minder' characters, it reached No. 21 in the UK charts at Christmas 1983.

In 1976, Waterman released his first album, Downwind of Angels, arranged and produced by Brian Bennett. A single, "I Will Glide", was released from the album.

In 1978, Waterman returned to the RSC to play Sackett in Bronson Howard's comedy Saratoga.

=== 1980s ===
Waterman starred in a television film made by Tyne Tees Television entitled The World Cup: A Captain's Tale (1982). It was the true story of West Auckland Town F.C., a part-time side who won the Sir Thomas Lipton Trophy, sometimes described as the 'First World Cup', in 1909 and 1911. Waterman played the part of Bob Jones, the club captain. It cost £1.5 million to make, most of which was funded by Waterman. Shooting took place in the North East and in Turin in Italy. Scenes were shot in County Durham pit villages and in Ashington, Northumberland, where goalposts and a grandstand were erected in a public park with a colliery headframe in the background.

In 1982, Waterman starred in the musical Windy City. A relatively short-lived production, the cast included Amanda Redman, with whom Waterman had an eighteen-month affair during the run of the musical and with whom he later went on to star in the TV series New Tricks. Windy City closed after 250 performances. Waterman took the lead male role in the BAFTA Award-winning BBC adaptation of Fay Weldon's The Life and Loves of a She-Devil (1986).

In an Australian television film, The First Kangaroos (1988), Waterman's depiction of the rugby player Albert Goldthorpe drew formal complaints from Goldthorpe's granddaughter.

In 1988, Waterman voiced Vernon's sidekick Toaster in the children's animated series Tube Mice, which also starred George Cole. After ten years as Terry, Waterman severed his Minder role in 1989.

=== 1990s ===
After leaving Minder, Waterman appeared as Thomas Gynn in the comedy drama Stay Lucky (1989–93), with Jan Francis and Emma Wray; self-made millionaire Tony Carpenter in the sitcom On the Up (1990–92); and John Neil in the mini series Circles of Deceit (1995–96). Between 1997 and 1999, he appeared in series 3 and 4 of the crime drama The Knock.

=== 2000s ===
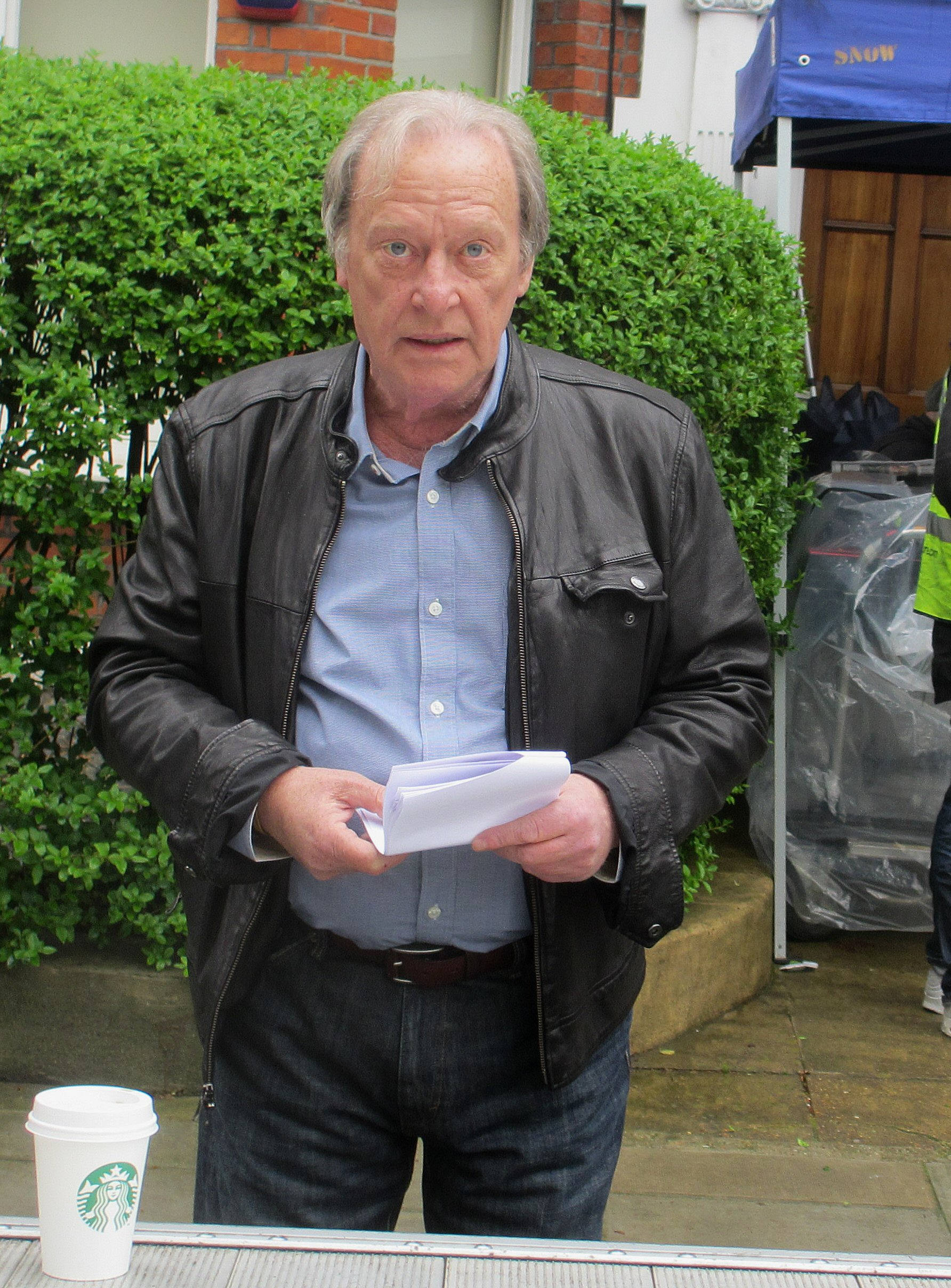
Waterman filming New Tricks in 2012

He was a regular cast member in every series of New Tricks, from 2003 to 2014, and also sang the theme song. Waterman appeared on stage in Jeffrey Bernard is Unwell by Keith Waterhouse and as Alfred P. Doolittle in the 2001 London revival of My Fair Lady. In 2005-06 he was the voice of Walter Thompson in Churchill's Bodyguard for the 13-part TV documentary based on Thompson's journals. Waterman narrated the reality-format television programme Bad Lads' Army and appeared in the 2009 BBC2 mini-series Moses Jones.

=== 2020s ===
In 2020, Waterman starred in the Australian drama-comedy film Never Too Late which had been filmed in Adelaide, Australia, the previous year. The Minder Podcast revealed that Waterman was semi-retired and living in Spain. The podcast referred to Waterman as "a truly underrated actor" and following Waterman's death pledged to go off air for seven weeks, one for each series of Minder he had appeared in, in commemoration. An audio tribute episode was released after seven weeks. In May 2023 the show broadcast a second tribute, Revisiting Reminder.

== Personal life and death ==
Waterman was married four times:

- Penny Dixon (1967–1976)
- Patricia Maynard (1977–1987), an actress with whom he had two daughters, one of whom, Hannah Waterman, is also an actress. Hannah is best known for playing Laura Beale in the BBC1 soap opera EastEnders, and later appeared in New Tricks alongside Waterman as his character's daughter.
- Rula Lenska (1987–1998) Waterman's marriage to Lenska ended because of his violent behaviour towards her. In March 2012, he caused controversy with some comments on this issue: "It's not difficult for a woman to make a man hit her. She certainly wasn't a beaten wife, she was hit and that's different." Lenska said there was a "violent, abusive pattern"; Waterman himself admitted he might have "drunk too much" to remember details. The interview was broadcast in full on Piers Morgan's Life Stories on ITV in May 2012.
- Pam Flint (November 2011–2022)

Waterman emigrated to Spain with his wife Pam in 2015 after New Tricks ended, living at a villa in La Manga, and playing golf at the La Manga Club.

Waterman was banned from driving for three years in January 1991, following his second drink driving conviction in four years. He was a fan of Chelsea F.C. His love of football was reflected in him being chosen to present Match of the Seventies from 1995 to 1996, a nostalgic BBC show celebrating the best football matches from the 1970s.

In 2015, his friend of many years, George Cole, who had played Arthur Daley in Minder, died aged 90. Waterman delivered the eulogy at Cole's funeral on 12 August.

On 8 May 2022, Waterman died from lung cancer at his home on La Manga, Spain, aged 74.

== In popular culture ==
=== Little Britain ===
Waterman was caricatured by David Walliams in the radio and TV comedy series Little Britain, in sketches where he visits his agent, Jeremy Rent (played by Matt Lucas), looking for parts. Most of the jokes in these sketches feature Waterman being extremely small, with common objects being made to appear massive in comparison. The Waterman caricature is offered, but always declines, respectable parts because he is not allowed to "write the theme tune, sing the theme tune" of the particular production. This running joke is based on Waterman having sung the theme tunes for at least four of the programmes in which he starred, namely Minder, Stay Lucky, On the Up and New Tricks. In November 2006, Waterman made a guest appearance in Comic Relief Does Little Britain Live, alongside the comedy character version of himself.

== Bibliography ==
- 2000: Waterman, Dennis; and Jill Arlon. – ReMinder. – London: Hutchinson. – ISBN 978-0-09-180108-3.

== Filmography ==
- Night Train for Inverness (1960) – Ted Lewis
- Ali and the Camel (1960) – (voice)
- Snowball (1960) – Mickey Donovan
- Crooks Anonymous (1962) – Boy in Park
- The Pirates of Blood River (1962) – Timothy Blackthorne
- Go Kart Go (1963) – Jimpy
- Up the Junction (1968) – Pete
- Oh! What a Lovely War (1969)
- The Smashing Bird I Used to Know (1969) – Peter
- Wedding Night (1970) – Joe O'Reilly – Groom
- My Lover, My Son (1970) – James Anderson
- A Promise of Bed (also known as This, That and the Other) (1970) – Photographer
- Scars of Dracula (1970) – Simon Carlson
- Fright (1971) – Chris
- Man in the Wilderness (1971) – Lowrie
- Alice's Adventures in Wonderland (1972) – 2 of Spades
- The Belstone Fox (1973) – Stephen Durno
- Sweeney! (1977) – Det. Sgt. George Carter
- Sweeney 2 (1978) – Det. Sgt. George Carter
- The World Cup: A Captain's Tale (1982)
- Minder on the Orient Express (1985)
- The Life and Loves of a She-Devil (TV, 1986) – Bobbo
- The First Kangaroos (1988) – Albert Goldthorpe
- Cold Justice (1989) – Father Jim
- Fiddley Foodle Bird (1991)
- Vol-au-vent (1996) – Pete / Kevin
- Arthur's Dyke (2001) – Derek Doubleday
- Back in Business (2007) – Jarvis
- Run for Your Wife (2012, Cameo role)
- Never Too Late (2020) – Jeremiah Caine

== Discography ==
=== Albums ===
Year	Title	AUS Chart	Label	Cat. No.
1976	Down Wind of Angels	-	DJM	DJF 20483
1977	Waterman	-	DJM	DJF 20513
1980	So Good For You	59	EMI	EMC 3349

=== Singles ===
Date	A-Side	B-Side	Label	Chart (UK)	Chart (AUS)
12 March 1976	"For Their Pleasure"	"You're A Part of Me"	DJM	–	–
8 October 1976	"I Will Glide"	"Snakes And Ladders"	DJM	–	–
21 January 1977	"Hooray for Curly Woolf"	"Don't Say No"	DJM	–	–
Sep 1977	"It Ain't Easy"	"Rock 'N' Roll Sunshine Lady"	DJM	–	–
Aug 1979	"Love's Left Me Bleeding"	"Nothing at All"	EMI	–	–
Oct 1980	"I Could Be So Good for You"	"Nothing at All"	EMI	3	9
Jun 1980	"Holding On to Love"	"Gone Wrong Song"	EMI	–	–
Jan 1981	"Wasn't Love Strong Enough"	"Gone Wrong Song"	EMI	–	–
May 1981	"Come Away with Me"	"If Only"	EMI	–	–
Mar 1982	"We Don't Make Love on Sundays"	"Indian Silk"	C&D	–	–
Jul 1982	"Shake the City"	"Wait Till I Get You on Your Own Tonight"	EMI	–	–
Dec 1983	"What Are We Gonna Get 'Er Indoors?"	"Quids and Quavers"	EMI	21	–
