= Patricia Maynard =

British actress

- Born: Sheffield, South Yorkshire, England
- Occupation: Actress
- Spouse(s): Dennis Waterman (m. 1977; div. 1987) Jeremy Griggs
- Children: 2, including Hannah

Patricia Maynard is a British actress who is known primarily for her work on television and in theatre.

== Early life and education ==
Patricia Maynard was born in Beighton, Sheffield, and raised in Tooting Bec, South London and went to school in Battersea, just down the road from the Old Vic where she learned her love of Shakespeare. She trained at the Guildhall School of Music and Drama.

== Career ==
The first five years of her career were spent in rep and the theatre. One of her first theatrical engagements was in a play Collapse of a Stout Party, written by Trevor Peacock; in 1965, she appeared in The Philanderer in Manchester. In 1966, she joined the RSC, the same year as Trevor Nunn and Terry Hands, with appearances as Katharine to Ian Holm’s Henry V and also Castiza in The Revenger's Tragedy. She was at the Bristol Old Vic from 1967–69, where her plays included Blithe Spirit, Comedy of Errors, Venice Preserved (with Alan Bates, Bernard Hepton and Alan Webb), Vote, Vote, Vote for Nigel Barton by Dennis Potter, and a musical of Nancy Mitford’s book The Pursuit of Love written by Julian Slade. She returned to Bristol in 1982, playing Lady India in Anouilh’s Ring Round the Moon.

Her television work has included playing the heroine Cora in The Last of the Mohicans in 1971, the children's science fiction series Escape Into Night as governess Miss Chesterfield in 1972 and the 1974-75 Doctor Who serial Robot, as leading villain Hilda Winters. She appeared in two films for television in the 1970s, When Day is Done, co-starring with Edward Woodward, and Lives of our Own. Her TV series have included This Year, Next Year about Yorkshire hill farmers, General Hospital, playing the gynaecologist, with Lynda Bellingham, Strike it Rich - two series in the 1980s - and guest appearances in The Sweeney ("Abduction"), Minder (for which she wrote the lyrics to the show's theme song - "I Could Be So Good for You"), Jemima Shore Investigates, The House of Eliott, and Campion. She has appeared in most of the soaps of the time – Coronation Street, Emmerdale Farm, Casualty, Holby City, Crossroads and EastEnders, where she played the part of Edwina Dunn, the mother of Laura Beale, who was played by her daughter Hannah.

== Personal life ==
Maynard was the second wife of actor Dennis Waterman. They had two daughters, one of whom is the actress Hannah Waterman.

Maynard is married to Jeremy David Griggs (b.1945) a retired circuit judge (2010) for the region of the South West of England.
