= Escape Into Night =

1972 British children's television serial

- Genre: Fantasy; Horror; Children's
- Created by: Catherine Storr
- Developed by: Ruth Boswell
- Country of origin: United Kingdom
- Original language: English
- No. of series: 1
- No. of episodes: 6

Production
- Producer: Alan Coleman
- Running time: 25 minutes
- Production company: ATV Midlands

Original release
- Network: ITV
- Release: 19 April – 24 May 1972

Escape Into Night is a six-part British children's fantasy horror television serial made by ATV for ITV that was broadcast from 19 April to 24 May 1972. It was directed by Richard Bramall.

The serial was an adaptation of Catherine Storr's 1958 novel Marianne Dreams, and deals with a young girl, Marianne, whose drawings become the basis for dreams, and how the dividing line between dreams and reality blurs. The novel was later adapted into a 1988 film, Paperhouse.

The series was made in colour, but the original colour masters are missing; only black-and-white telerecordings of the series exists. These surviving recordings were released in the UK on Region 2 by Network Distributing Ltd Home Entertainment in May 2009.

For its theme music, Escape Into Night used a segment of the third movement of the Symphony No.6 in E minor by Ralph Vaughan Williams.

It was filmed at Barr Beacon, Aldridge.

== Cast ==
Character	Actor
Marianne	Vikki Chambers
Mrs Austen	Sonia Graham
Mark	Steven Jones
Miss Chesterfield	Patricia Maynard
Dr Burton	Edmund Pegge

== Episodes ==
No.	Title	First broadcast
1	"Episode One"	19 April 1972
2	"Episode Two"	26 April 1972
3	"Episode Three"	3 May 1972
4	"Episode Four"	10 May 1972
5	"Episode Five"	17 May 1972
6	"Episode Six"	24 May 1972
