= Elliott Spiers =

British actor (1973–1994)

- Born: Elliott Vaughan Spiers; 12 October 1973; London, England
- Died: 15 January 1994 (aged 20); Royal Free Hospital, London, England
- Occupation: Actor
- Years active: 1988–1994

Elliott Vaughan Spiers (12 October 1973 – 15 January 1994) was an English actor.

== Career ==
Spiers made his acting debut in an episode of the 1986 children's drama series Dodger, Bonzo and the Rest. Next, he appeared in an episode of Jim Henson's television series The Storyteller in the episode titled "The Heartless Giant" in 1987. He also appeared in two films, Paperhouse (1988) and Taxandria (1994) which was his final acting role. Taxandria was filmed in 1989, but was not released until 1994 due to its lengthy post-production.

== Death ==
Spiers suffered a negative reaction to an anti-malaria medication that left him gravely ill. He could not do the dubbing for Taxandria so another actor was used in his place. He never recovered, and died aged 20 on 15 January at the Royal Free Hospital, prior to Taxandria's release. The film was dedicated to his memory and released eight months after his death at a screening in October 1994 in the Flanders Film Festival.
