= Carving a Statue =

1964 play by Graham Greene

Carving a Statue is a 1964 three-act play by Graham Greene. Set in a studio in South London, the play revolves around the relationship between a father and his son. The father obsesses over his carving of a large stone statue of God – which has been in progress for sixteen years. The son continuously fails to connect with his father, and attempts to bring girls into the studio and start a relationship.

== Characters ==
- The Father
- His Son
- The First Girl
- The Second Girl
- Dr Parker

== Productions ==
Carving a Statue was first produced by Peter Wood on 17 September 1964 at the Haymarket Theatre, London. The cast consisted of; Ralph Richardson as The Father, Dennis Waterman as His Son, Barbara Ferris as The First Girl, Jane Birkin as The Second Girl and Roland Culver as Dr Parker.

The play was staged off-Broadway at the Gramercy Arts Theater in 1968, in a production directed by Margaret Webster. The cast comprised Larry Gates as The Father, Saylor Cresswell as His Son, Fran Myers as the First Girl, Judy Allen as the Second Girl and Tony Capodilupo as Dr. Parker.

== Graham Greene On Carving a Statue ==
"Never before have I known a play like this one so tormenting to write or so fatiguing in production. I am grateful to the reviewers who may have a little accelerated the end. At the age of sixty there is no reason to work, except to earn a living or to have 'fun'. This play was never fun and I earn my living in another field".
