= Clever Polly and the Stupid Wolf =

Children's book series by Catherine Storr

Clever Polly and the Stupid Wolf is a series of four children's books by Catherine Storr. The first, Clever Polly and the Stupid Wolf, was published in 1955, with illustrations by Marjorie-Ann Watts.

A review in The Guardian stated, "there are many levels to them. The wolf is simultaneously a dangerous wild animal, a sexual predator and an annoying little brother, slipping from one role to another within the space of a sentence... You get a real sense of the wolf being truly threatening, sinister and cunning, but this is almost immediately dispelled, a few lines on, by his childlike pleasure in having managed some shopping on his own. This agility in the storytelling keeps the book from being just frightening, just comic, or just a cautionary tale."

Storr's real-life daughter Polly commented, "Children love it because it's funny, and because the wolf makes silly mistakes of the kind they might make themselves. So they can sympathise with him, and feel superior to him, at the same time."

They were reissued by Penguin Books as "The Complete Adventures of Clever Polly and the Stupid Wolf".

== Books ==
- Clever Polly and the Stupid Wolf (1955)
- Polly and the Wolf Again (1967)
- Tales of Polly and the Hungry Wolf (1980)
- Last Stories of Polly and the Wolf (1990) (Republished as "More Stories of Clever Polly and the Stupid Wolf")
