= List of Man About the House episodes =

Man About the House is a British sitcom starring Richard O'Sullivan, Paula Wilcox, Sally Thomsett, Yootha Joyce and Brian Murphy. First broadcast on ITV on 15 August 1973, the series ran for 39 episodes over six series until 7 April 1976. Written by Johnnie Mortimer and Brian Cooke, the series follows the lives of three flatmates and the couple who sublet the church-commissioned property. The series, which was made by Thames Television and recorded at their Teddington Studios, was considered rather risqué when it was first broadcast as it focused on a young single man sharing a flat with two young single women.

Man About the House led to two spin-off series, George and Mildred and Robin's Nest.

== Series overview ==
Series	Episodes	Originally released	
Series	Episodes	First released	Last released
1	7	15 August 1973	26 September 1973
2	6	9 January 1974	13 February 1974
3	7	9 October 1974	20 November 1974
4	6	6 March 1975	10 April 1975
5	6	4 September 1975	9 October 1975
6	7	25 February 1976	7 April 1976

== Episodes ==
=== Series 1 (1973) ===
No. overall	No. in series	Title	Produced & Directed by	Written by	Original release date
1	1	"Three's a Crowd!"	Peter Frazer-Jones	Johnnie Mortimer & Brian Cooke	15 August 1973
After their flatmate moves out, Chrissy and Jo need a replacement. Unimpressed with talkative prospective flatmate Gabrielle (Helen Fraser), they decide Robin Tripp is ideal as he can cook, but George the flat's caretaker, who lives downstairs, does not think it morally appropriate. Chrissy allays his fears by falsely telling George that Robin is gay.
2	2	"And Mother Makes Four"	Peter Frazer-Jones	Johnnie Mortimer & Brian Cooke	22 August 1973
Chrissy's mother (Daphne Oxenford) comes to stay, so Jo and Chrissy try to hide the fact that their new flatmate is a man. It turns out that George has already told her and she does not mind, reasoning that she will not have to worry about them since there is a man about the house.
3	3	"Some Enchanted Evening"	Peter Frazer-Jones	Johnnie Mortimer & Brian Cooke	29 August 1973
Jo has her date, David, who is very reluctant romantically, round for the evening. Robin is talked into preparing the meal. To give Jo some space, Robin and Chrissy visit the Ropers and play French Monopoly with them. The date goes badly, due to Jo serving bacon and pork to David, unaware that he will not eat such meat because he is Jewish. After David leaves, Robin finds the rejected food in the lampshade.
4	4	"And Then, There Were Two!"	Peter Frazer-Jones	Johnnie Mortimer & Brian Cooke	5 September 1973
Jo is going to her sister's for the weekend. Chrissy worries that Robin will make sexual advances towards her. Later on Saturday, he brings his girlfriend Liz (Jenny Hanley) back to the flat, to which Chrissy becomes jealous. Later that night, Chrissy deliberately ruins his evening by walking in, pretending to be pregnant by him and falsely claiming that she and Jo are his lovers. Liz walks out. First appearance of Larry Simmonds (Doug Fisher).
5	5	"It's Only Money!"	Peter Frazer-Jones	Johnnie Mortimer & Brian Cooke	12 September 1973
Robin and Chrissy return home to find their front door open and the rent money that was on the sideboard missing. They frantically try to raise the money, avoiding George - who eventually tells them that he took the rent money, but they still owe him this month's rent.
6	6	"Match of the Day"	Peter Frazer-Jones	Johnnie Mortimer & Brian Cooke	19 September 1973
George has a nasty cold and gives it to Robin, who is annoyed, because he is playing a football match at the weekend. So Chrissy and Jo try to make him better using a range of home-made remedies. As he walks onto the pitch, he realises that it is a rugby match. Featuring: Duncan Lamont as Dr. Macleod
7	7	"No Children, No Dogs"	Peter Frazer-Jones	Johnnie Mortimer & Brian Cooke	26 September 1973
Larry has three puppies, which he is trying to find homes for. Robin tells him that the landlord of their local pub is looking for a dog. At Larry's request, Robin takes one of the dogs round to the landlord; but, when he arrives, Larry has already sold him one, leaving Robin stuck with a puppy. No pets are allowed in the flat. Will the Ropers find out?

=== Series 2 (1974) ===
No. overall	No. in series	Title	Produced & Directed by	Written by	Original release date
8	1	"While the Cat's Away"	Peter Frazer-Jones	Johnnie Mortimer & Brian Cooke	9 January 1974
When George and Mildred go to stay at her wealthy sister's house, the flatmates plan a party. Chrissy invites self-centred actor Mark (Ian Lavender), with whom she is infatuated, and Robin invites Liz (Jenny Hanley). Mark moves in on Liz, so Robin tries to seduce Chrissy. When George delights over his brother-in-law's conviction for drink driving, they are told to leave. They come home early and are invited to the party. Later, when moving his car, the breathalyser catches up with George.
9	2	"Colour Me Yellow"	Peter Frazer-Jones	Johnnie Mortimer & Brian Cooke	16 January 1974
Robin brags about his proficiency at judo, but when Chrissy is harassed by an intimidating, tall man (Paul Angelis) at the pub, Robin defends her using words and the man backs off. However, Robin worries that he came off as a coward and is eager to prove otherwise.
10	3	"In Praise of Older Men"	Peter Frazer-Jones	Johnnie Mortimer & Brian Cooke	23 January 1974
Chrissy's new boyfriend Ian Cross (Norman Eshley) invites her along to a "business trip" in Bournemouth. Mildred tells Robin and Jo that Ian is married and they inform Chrissy. She tells him that she knows, to which Ian tells her he is divorced. Robin subsequently finds out Ian is still married and takes Chrissie to visit Ian's wife. George tries to sell Robin his defective car.
11	4	"Did You Ever Meet Rommel?"	Peter Frazer-Jones	Johnnie Mortimer & Brian Cooke	30 January 1974
Chrissy invites the Ropers up for a meal, not realising that Robin has invited his German friend Franz Wasserman (Dennis Waterman). The meal does not go well, as George has a grudge against the Germans and will not stop taking about the war.
12	5	"Two Foot Two, Eyes of Blue"	Peter Frazer-Jones	Johnnie Mortimer & Brian Cooke	6 February 1974
Jo is going on a date with Philip, but has forgotten that she is meant to be babysitting for Simon and Podge (Jo Kendall) - who is nine months pregnant. Chrissy agrees to take her place and persuades Robin to come with her as the house has a colour TV. When they arrive, it looks as if Robin is going to regret his decision, as the TV is being repaired and the drinks cabinet is locked. Bella Emberg also appears. The baby is played by Christopher Brett
13	6	"Carry Me Back to Old Southampton"	Peter Frazer-Jones	Johnnie Mortimer & Brian Cooke	13 February 1974
Robin fails his cooking exams and feels he has to go back to Southampton and join his father's business. However, his father (Leslie Sands) admits Robin is not suited to the family business and more suited to cooking, and agrees to fund Robin to re-take his course. Larry believes he will take Robin's place in the flat and burns his bridges with his fussy landlord.

=== Series 3 (1974) ===
No. overall	No. in series	Title	Produced & Directed by	Written by	Original release date
14	1	"Cuckoo in the Nest"	Peter Frazer-Jones	Johnnie Mortimer & Brian Cooke	9 October 1974
Having been thrown out of his flat, Larry is staying with Robin, but the flat is too crowded. So, when the Ropers decide to convert the attic into another flat, Larry moves into it. Featuring: Norman Chappell as Mr. Morris
15	2	"Come Into My Parlour"	Peter Frazer-Jones	Johnnie Mortimer & Brian Cooke	16 October 1974
Robin plots to seduce his naive new girlfriend Angie (Caroline Dowdeswell) over dinner in the flat. Chrissy objects in a mix of jealousy and concern. When Angie arrives, she is revealed as Chrissy's former school chum. Angie insists that Chrissy stays for dinner, angering Robin, so he plans a second dinner and a contrite Chrissy is stuck with an evening looking at George's holiday snaps.
16	3	"I Won't Dance, Don't Ask Me..."	Peter Frazer-Jones	Johnnie Mortimer & Brian Cooke	23 October 1974
Chrissy and Jo are going to their staff dinner dance and Chrissy does not have a partner, so she decides that Robin should accompany her. All he needs now is dancing lessons from Mildred and a dinner jacket from George.
17	4	"Of Mice and Women"	Peter Frazer-Jones	Johnnie Mortimer & Brian Cooke	30 October 1974
Jo sees a mouse in her bedroom and refuses to sleep in there. Much to Chrissy's dismay, Jo swaps with Robin while the mouse is on the loose. Larry kills the mouse.
18	5	"Somebody Out There Likes Me!"	Peter Frazer-Jones	Johnnie Mortimer & Brian Cooke	6 November 1974
Chrissy receives flowers and chocolates from a secret admirer. She gives them to Mildred, who uses them to make George jealous, assuming that Mildred has a secret admirer. It turns out that the admirer had meant the presents for Jo, whom he had wrongly assumed to be called Chrissy.
19	6	"We Shall Not Be Moved"	Peter Frazer-Jones	Johnnie Mortimer & Brian Cooke	13 November 1974
When Mildred is away visiting her sister, George attempts to evict the tenants so that he and Jerry can convert the flat into separate units to increase the rental income. When Mildred comes home early and discovers the plan, she stops it.
20	7	"Three of a Kind"	Peter Frazer-Jones	Johnnie Mortimer & Brian Cooke	20 November 1974
While Robin is in hospital having his tonsils removed, Chrissy takes his place at the weekly card game. She claims that a woman can play cards just as well as a man, even though she does not know how to play poker. George steals the money that Mildred has been saving for a new coat so that he can join the card game. Featuring: Duncan Lamont as Dr. Macleod

=== Series 4 (1975) ===
No. overall	No. in series	Title	Produced & Directed by	Written by	Original release date
21	1	"Home and Away"	Peter Frazer-Jones	Brian Cooke	6 March 1975
Robin and Chrissy have borrowed the Ropers' car to drive to Southampton for the Arsenal match, but the car breaks down and they miss the game. Meanwhile, George has bought himself a toupée, which becomes the talking point of the pub.
22	2	"One for the Road"	Peter Frazer-Jones	Brian Cooke	13 March 1975
Chrissy is practising for her driving test and is receiving lessons from Robin. Meanwhile, George has started making home brew liquor, which turns out rather stronger than expected. He offers a glass to Robin, who is about to take Chrissy out for a driving lesson. Robin is stopped by the police whilst moving the car after Chrissy squashes a man's bicycle. Robin is later convicted of drink-driving. When Chrissy takes her test, her examiner is the same man, and she squashes his bicycle again.
23	3	"All in the Game"	Peter Frazer-Jones	Johnnie Mortimer & Brian Cooke	20 March 1975
George thinks that the upstairs flat has woodworm and gets Jerry to investigate. Jerry soon realises it is not woodworm but dart holes. However, he tells George that the room needs fumigation, which will cost him dearly. It also means that the flatmates will have to spend the night with the Ropers, playing board games with them.
24	4	"Never Give Your Real Name"	Peter Frazer-Jones	Johnnie Mortimer & Brian Cooke	27 March 1975
Larry gives girls fake names, the most recent one he uses is Robin Tripp; so when a girl turns up at the door saying she is pregnant, Chrissy and Jo think Robin is a real bounder. When the girls tell him about her visit, he wrongly assumes that it was his girlfriend Linda. He proposes to her, before he finds out the truth from Larry and unproposes. The girl phones Larry to tell him that she is not pregnant, but her father is still angry and visits, hitting George after mistaking him for his daughter's lover.
25	5	"The Tender Trap"	Peter Frazer-Jones	Johnnie Mortimer & Brian Cooke	3 April 1975
George is trying to sell tickets for the British legion concert at which he will be singing, but nobody is interested. Chrissy has the best excuse as she is going to her sister's child's christening in her Sussex home town, taking Robin with her. Chrissy finds it unbearable at her parents’ home due to her mother's incessant pressurising her to marry. Therefore, they return to London and the concert - at which George's singing is dreadful.
26	6	"My Son, My Son"	Peter Frazer-Jones	Johnnie Mortimer & Brian Cooke	10 April 1975
The Inland Revenue are investigating George for tax irregularities and come round to talk to him and his son, whom he invented for financial gain. George tries to persuade one of his tenants to pretend to be his fictitious son. A mix-up means that Larry, Robin and Jo all turn up - pretending to be the non-existent Leslie. Featuring: Anthony Sharp as Mr. Matthews. John Carlin also appears.

=== Series 5 (1975) ===
No. overall	No. in series	Title	Produced & Directed by	Written by	Original release date
27	1	"The Last Picture Show"	Peter Frazer-Jones	Johnnie Mortimer & Brian Cooke	4 September 1975
It is Chrissy's birthday and she receives a cine camera and projector from her boyfriend Neil. Larry plans to use it to watch a porn film.
28	2	"Right Said George"	Peter Frazer-Jones	Johnnie Mortimer & Brian Cooke	11 September 1975
George's car fails its MOT and he needs £20 to get it fixed, so he sells his piano to Robin. They are unable to carry it upstairs, so Jerry uses a crane to try to bring it in through the upstairs front window. Unfamiliar with the controls, he releases it, causing it to fall on George's car; the piano collapses as it destroys the car's roof. Featuring: Roy Kinnear as Jerry.
29	3	"A Little Knowledge"	Peter Frazer-Jones	Johnnie Mortimer & Brian Cooke	18 September 1975
George needs help finding the answers for all the competitions he enters. Luckily, Robin is starting a new job selling encyclopedias and is looking for his first buyer. A mix-up with the sales form means that George has sold them to Robin. Featuring: Peter Jones as Mr Morris.
30	4	"Love and Let Love"	Peter Frazer-Jones	Johnnie Mortimer & Brian Cooke	25 September 1975
While the flatmates compete to get the flat to themselves to entertain friends, George is trying to find jobs to avoid Mildred.
31	5	"How Does Your Garden Grow?"	Peter Frazer-Jones	Johnnie Mortimer & Brian Cooke	2 October 1975
When Mildred enters a flower arranging competition, Chrissy offers her a plant found in the garden for her display. When Larry sees one of the plants removed from the garden in Chrissy's flat he thinks it is a cannabis plant, so Robin puts it in the back of a bin lorry. At the competition, it is revealed by the judge to not be cannabis.
32	6	"Come Fly with Me!"	Peter Frazer-Jones	Johnnie Mortimer & Brian Cooke	9 October 1975
Chrissy receives two tickets for a Frank Sinatra concert, but does not want them. Instead, she enjoys being pampered by Jo and Robin as they compete for the tickets. Meanwhile, George buys Mildred a budgerigar for their wedding anniversary. He gives it to the tenants to look after, but it escapes - so they give him the concert tickets as a replacement present.

=== Series 6 (1976) ===
No. overall	No. in series	Title	Produced & Directed by	Written by	Original release date
33	1	"The Party's Over!"	Peter Frazer-Jones	Johnnie Mortimer & Brian Cooke	25 February 1976
George is not happy that the tenants are having a party, but Mildred is delighted as she is invited. However, George spoils the party by placing a "party cancelled" sign on the front door. When Mildred finds out, she leaves home. George is lonely without her and starts to pester the flatmates. Will they manage to persuade Mildred to return? Featuring: Hilda Braid as Mrs Hollins. John Carlin also appears. Note: Sally Thomsett (Jo) does not appear.
34	2	"One More for the Pot"	Peter Frazer-Jones	Johnnie Mortimer & Brian Cooke	3 March 1976
The lease is up on the flat and George wants to increase the rent. The flatmates decide that the only way to raise the money is to get a fourth tenant to share but they cannot decide on a suitable person.
35	3	"The Generation Game"	Peter Frazer-Jones	Johnnie Mortimer & Brian Cooke	10 March 1976
Mildred is going to the Floral Society annual dinner dance. George does not want to go and locks himself in the bathroom to avoid Mildred's protests. Robin agrees to accompany Mildred to the dance leaving George rather jealous.
36	4	"The Sunshine Boys"	Peter Frazer-Jones	Johnnie Mortimer & Brian Cooke	17 March 1976
George needs some money so he sells Mildred's sun lamp to Larry for £5, who sells it to Robin for £10. Later, when Mildred is upstairs, she sees her lamp and thinks Robin has stolen it. Mildred is angry with George when she finds out that he sold it.
37	5	"Mum Always Liked You Best"	Peter Frazer-Jones	Johnnie Mortimer & Brian Cooke	24 March 1976
Robin's brother Norman comes to stay for two days and takes a shine to Chrissy, which is reciprocated. Robin does his best to discourage Norman. When the three of them go out to dinner and Robin gets food poisoning, Norman says he will stay for a week till he recovers. Featuring: Norman Eshley as Norman Tripp
38	6	"Fire Down Below"	Peter Frazer-Jones	Johnnie Mortimer & Brian Cooke	31 March 1976
George has received a £40 gas bill and has decided to open up his chimney, but it needs to be swept so he gets a gadget from Jerry to suck out the soot. Meanwhile, things have moved on considerably with Norman and Chrissy, which Robin is jealous about - but just as Norman is about to propose they are covered in soot. The music featured in this episode - 'Chabadabada' from the film Un homme et une femme, (A Man and a Woman) - plays as Norman and Chrissy go sight-seeing around famous London landmarks including The Tower of London, Piccadilly Circus, and Trafalgar Square. Featuring: Norman Eshley as Norman Tripp
39	7	"Another Bride, Another Groom"	Peter Frazer-Jones	Johnnie Mortimer & Brian Cooke	7 April 1976
It's the day before Norman and Chrissy's wedding and Mildred is upset that she has not received an invitation. However, when she delivers their wedding present, she discovers that they have been invited and that George has hidden it from her because he wants to go to a darts match. Featuring: Norman Eshley as Norman Tripp
