= I Could Be So Good for You (Dennis Waterman song) =

Single by Dennis Waterman

from the album So Good for You
- B-side: "Nothing at All"
- Released: October 1979; 13 October 1980 (reissue)
- Recorded: 1979
- Genre: Pop
- Length: 3:17
- Label: EMI
- Songwriters: Gerard Kenny; Patricia Waterman
- Producer: Christopher Neil

Dennis Waterman singles chronology
"Love's Left Me Bleeding" (1979)	"I Could Be So Good for You" (1979)	"Holding on to Love" (1980)

"I Could Be So Good for You" was a 1979 single for actor / singer Dennis Waterman. The theme song for his series Minder, it became a significant hit for him with the single's re-release.

== Background ==
The theme tune, "I Could Be So Good for You", written in 1979 by Gerard Kenny and Patricia Waterman, was sung by Dennis Waterman. It was released as a single in October 1979, credited to 'Dennis Waterman with the Dennis Waterman Band', but failed to enter the charts. It was then re-released in October 1980, upon which it became more successful, peaking at No.3 in the UK Singles Chart in November. The writing credit of Kenny/Waterman often lead people to mis-credit Dennis as co-writer. Dennis Waterman also sang the theme songs to other programmes he starred in, including On the Up, Stay Lucky, and New Tricks, and this led to a parody in Little Britain where Dennis Waterman played by David Walliams is offered acting work; he always assumes he will also "write the theme tune, sing the theme tune...".

The words for the song were included in the 27 November – 10 December 1980 issue of Smash Hits.

== Other versions ==
Glasgow band Attic Lights re-worked the theme for the 2009 series.

Writer Gerard Kenny has also released his own version of the song, appearing on his 1994 album Time Between the Time. A live version of the song sung in duet between Gerard Kenny and Dennis Waterman was released on 1997's The Best of Gerard Kenny – The Singles album. Also, in 2004, Kenny released yet another album Coming Home which featured a "chilled" (and slower) recording of the song as its opening track. Kenny spoke about the composition of the song, including how Dennis Waterman gave his own writing credit to his wife to avoid a contractual obligation, and how he met Waterman in a 2021 interview.

In 2025, Robbie Williams covered the song with the BBC Concert Orchestra for the BBC Radio 2 Piano Room. He also performed the song as part of his Britpop Tour.

== Charts ==
=== Weekly charts ===
Chart (1980–83)	Peak position
Australia (Kent Music Report)	9
Ireland (IRMA)	5
New Zealand (Recorded Music NZ)	3
UK Singles (OCC)	3

=== Year-end charts ===
Chart (1983)	Position
Australia (Kent Music Report)	60
