= Catherine Storr =

English children's writer (1913–2001)

- Born: Catherine Cole; 21 July 1913; Kensington, London, England
- Died: 8 January 2001 (aged 87); London, England
- Education: St Paul's Girls' School; Newnham College, Cambridge; Middlesex Hospital
- Occupation: Novelist
- Spouse(s): Anthony Storr (1942–70); Thomas Balogh (1970–85)
- Children: Sophia; Polly; Emma
- Writing career
- Language: English
- Notable work: Marianne Dreams

Catherine Storr (née Catherine Cole; 21 July 1913 – 8 January 2001,) was an English children's writer, best known for her novel Marianne Dreams and for a series of books about a wolf ineptly pursuing a young girl, beginning with Clever Polly and the Stupid Wolf. She also wrote under the name Helen Lourie.

== Life ==
She was born in Kensington, London, one of three children of a barrister, Arthur Frederick Andrew Cole (1883–1968), and his wife, Margaret Henrietta, born Gaselee (1882–1971). One of her brothers was Hugo Cole, the composer and music critic. She attended St Paul's Girls' School, where she was taught music by Gustav Holst and became the school's organist. She went on to study English literature at Newnham College, Cambridge, and at first pursued a career as a novelist without success. Without giving up this ambition, she studied medicine, qualifying as a doctor in 1944. From 1950 to 1963 she acted as a Senior Medical Officer in the Department of Psychological Medicine at the Middlesex Hospital. Afterwards, while regularly producing children's books, she also worked as an editorial assistant for Penguin Books from 1966 to the early 1970s.

She had met the psychiatrist and author Anthony Storr (1920–2001) during her training and married him in 1942. They had three daughters, Sophia, Polly and Emma, but divorced in 1970. She later married economist and member of the House of Lords, Thomas Balogh (1905–1985).

Storr continued writing novels into her eighties. She died at her London flat in January 2001.

== Work ==
Unusually among the leading children's writers of her time, much of her work was for younger children, at the start of their reading, notably the series of stories about Polly and the wolf, which were written for her daughter, Polly. The stories, starting with the collection Clever Polly and the Stupid Wolf (1955), feature a wolf trying to catch a little girl: the wolf, himself a fairy tale figure, takes his always impractical subterfuges from fairy tales, but is outmatched by Polly every time.

A novel for slightly older children Marianne Dreams (1958) is more disturbing: a young girl, being tutored at home during sickness, travels in dreams to the house she has drawn while awake and meets there another pupil of her tutor; in a moment of jealousy she draws stones with eyes around the house to keep him prisoner and must then undo her actions. It was made into the TV series Escape Into Night and the film Paperhouse; Storr was not fond of the latter, and particularly disliked the ending.

Storr's books often involve confronting fears, even in the lighthearted Polly stories, and she was aware that she wrote frightening stories. On the subject, she writes: "We should show them that evil is something they already know about or half know. It's not something right outside themselves and this immediately puts it, not only into their comprehension, but it also gives them a degree of power".

An opera for schools, Flax into Gold: The Story of Rumpelstiltskin (1957), was written in collaboration with her brother, the composer Hugo Cole. She wrote two series of the ATV series Starting Out (1973 and 1976), made to be shown in schools.

== Books ==
- Clever Polly and the Stupid Wolf (1955)
- Polly and the Wolf Again (1967)
- Tales of Polly and the Hungry Wolf (1980)
- Last Stories of Polly and the Wolf (1990)
