= Landmarks (How I Met Your Mother) =

- How I Met Your Mother episode
- Episode no.: Season 6 Episode 23
- Directed by: Pamela Fryman
- Written by: Carter Bays; Craig Thomas
- Production code: 6ALH24
- Original air date: May 9, 2011

Guest appearances
- Jennifer Morrison as Zoey Pierson; Bob Odenkirk as Arthur Hobbs; Cristine Rose as Virginia Mosby

Episode chronology
← Previous "The Perfect Cocktail"	Next → "Challenge Accepted"
- How I Met Your Mother season 6

"Landmarks" is the 23rd episode of the sixth season of the CBS sitcom How I Met Your Mother and the 135th episode overall. It aired on May 9, 2011.

== Plot ==
Marshall presents his case for preserving the Arcadian at a meeting of the Landmark Preservation Commission (LPC), where the fate of the Arcadian would be decided once and for all. When Ted is called up to present his opinion, Future Ted explains how difficult it was for him to come to his decision.

Ever since Zoey had explained how she had grown up in the Arcadian, Ted had sided with her, hoping to keep their relationship strong. However, Barney learns from his boss Arthur Hobbs that not only will Ted be fired if the project does not go through, but Barney will also be fired for having suggested Ted as the architect in the first place. When Ted hears of this, he refuses to budge, but Robin explains that no matter what happens to the Arcadian, his relationship with Zoey will end badly: Zoey will feel betrayed if the Arcadian is not accepted as a landmark, otherwise Ted will blame Zoey for ruining his own dreams.

Ted soon has a dream with Barney dressed up as the original architect of the Arcadian. He convinces Ted that the Arcadian must go, as being able to design a building in New York would undoubtedly help his career and future. The next day at the LPC meeting, Ted ultimately says he does not wish for the Arcadian to be preserved. This prompts Zoey to present voice recordings of Ted saying how he was in support of the Arcadian's preservation, particularly mentioning its ornate stonework of a lion head.

With the LPC poised to give a decision the next morning, Ted is saddened to realize they will vote to preserve the Arcadian, causing him and Barney to lose their jobs. However, Lily comes up with a plan to have the Arcadian demolished. They go to Hobbs to explain their plan, but Hobbs is upset about losing everything, including his dog Tugboat, to his divorce. Marshall hugs Hobbs to comfort him, resolving their feud, and Lily then explains her plan on the condition that Ted and Barney keep their jobs, but Future Ted says that he cannot mention the specifics for legal reasons.

The next day, the LPC explain although they had been persuaded by Ted's description of the lion head stonework to preserve the Arcadian, the lion head had vanished the night before (the group got two construction workers to remove it), thus prompting them to ultimately decide not to preserve the Arcadian. Realizing what has happened, Zoey angrily confronts Ted; when he says sometimes things have to fall apart to make way for better things, she silently storms out on him, ending their relationship.

Later that night, Ted calls Barney so Barney can complain about Zoey. However, Barney admits that Zoey may have been right about the lion head, which he had mounted on a wall in his room.

== Reception ==
The A.V. Club's Donna Bowman gave the episode a B+ rating. TV Fanatic rated the episode 3.5 out of 5 stars. IGN, in its review, said "The one thing I will take away from this episode, however, is Ted's last line to Zoey: "Sometimes things have to fall apart to make room for better things." That's what I'm going to believe this episode was, the Ted/Zoey story falling apart to make room for the better stories in the last couple episode of the season." Uproxx said, "What the hell was that? And how did they not only think this was a good idea at the start of the season, but as it became clear early and often how much it wasn’t working? Even if they had Jennifer Morrison under contract for more episodes than the character wound up being worth, they could have pivoted and made lemonade out of this – turned Zoey into an outright villain or something to keep her around while embracing the loathsomeness of the character. Instead, they just kept scrambling and scrambling and scrambling to make it work, and even the promise of an epic break-up didn’t really come to pass, as things closed with a whimper."

This is the least viewed episode of the entire series, and only earned 6.41 million viewers.
