= Legendaddy =

Legendaddy may refer to

- "Legendaddy" (How I Met Your Mother), television episode
- Legendaddy (album), album by Daddy Yankee
