= Getting Lost (film) =

2024 documentary by Taylor Morden

- Release poster
- Directed by: Taylor Morden
- Produced by: Ralph D. Apel; Emily Claire; Taylor Morden; Jo Garfein
- Cinematography: Steven F. Heuer; Taylor Morden; Jonathan Thorpe
- Music by: Michael Giacchino
- Production company: PopMotion Pictures
- Release date: September 22, 2024
- Country: United States
- Language: English
- Budget: $250,794

Getting Lost (stylized as Getting LOST) is an independent documentary film directed and co-produced by Taylor Morden. It chronicles the development and cultural impact of ABC’s science fiction adventure drama television series Lost. The film features interviews with the cast and crew of the original series, and was fully financed by crowdfunding on Indiegogo. It premiered on September 22, 2024, twenty years after the show's pilot episode first aired on TV.

== Synopsis ==
The film documents the impact Lost has had on pop culture and television history, as well as the cult following the show has attracted since its release. Along with new interviews with the cast and crew of the original series, the film features interviews with members of the show's fan community, including celebrities, charity organizers, and podcast hosts. It also addresses reactions to the show's polarizing ending, and allegations of a toxic work environment on the show that were revealed during the film's production. It includes archival footage from the series itself, behind-the-scenes footage, and prior interviews.

== Cast ==
The documentary's cast includes around half of the main cast from Lost, several recurring cast members, multiple crew members who worked on the show, and longtime fans.

Main cast from Lost

- Evangeline Lilly
- Josh Holloway
- Jorge Garcia
- Terry O'Quinn
- Daniel Dae Kim
- Henry Ian Cusick
- Elizabeth Mitchell
- Emilie de Ravin
- Michael Emerson
- Nestor Carbonell
- Maggie Grace
- Jeff Fahey
- Malcolm David Kelley

Recurring and guest cast from Lost

- Sonya Walger
- François Chau
- Tania Raymonde
- Andrew Divoff
- Eric Lange
- Patrick Fischler
- Andrea Gabriel
- M. C. Gainey
- Daniel Roebuck
- Sterling Beaumon
- Greg Grunberg
- Sean Whalen
- Bai Ling

Crew of Lost, including writers, directors, and producers

- J. J. Abrams
- Damon Lindelof
- Carlton Cuse
- Jack Bender
- Michael Giacchino
- Bryan Burk
- Larry Fong
- Javier Grillo-Marxuach
- Brian Keaulana

Others peripherally involved with the series, including journalists, authors, fans, critics, podcasters, and bloggers

- Morgan Evans
- Allie Goertz
- Jeff Jensen
- Samm Levine
- Bobby Moynihan
- Ryan Ozawa
- Paul Scheer

== Production ==
The film was announced on March 8, 2023. It was fully financed by crowdfunding on Indiegogo. The campaign launched on August 15, 2023, and reached its initial funding goal of $42,000 in two days. The campaign ended on August 15, 2024, with a total of $250,794 raised by donors.

The director revealed on social media that Dominic Monaghan and Matthew Fox declined the invitation to join the documentary. Ian Somerhalder expressed interest in being part of the project but couldn't participate due to scheduling reasons.

== Release ==
Getting Lost premiered on September 22, 2024, at the Fine Arts Theatre in Beverly Hills, CA. This date marked the 20th anniversary of the original series' premiere. Several actors who appeared in the show and documentary were seen at the premiere, including Jorge Garcia, Maggie Grace, Malcolm David Kelley, and Bai Ling. The Hawaiʻi International Film Festival screened the film as part of its 2024 program on October 11.

Serielizados, a film festival in Barcelona, screened Getting Lost on October 16, 2024. Phoenix Cinema in London screened the documentary followed by a one-hour filmed Q&A session on November 2, 2024.

Canadian movie theater chain Cineplex held screenings of Getting Lost in theaters on November 3, 2024 and November 6, 2024.
