= Glitter (How I Met Your Mother) =

- How I Met Your Mother episode
- Episode no.: Season 6 Episode 9
- Directed by: Pamela Fryman
- Written by: Kourtney Kang
- Production code: 6ALH08
- Original air date: November 15, 2010

Guest appearances
- Nicole Scherzinger as Jessica Glitter; Chris Romano as Punchy; Stefanie Black as Kelly; Alan Thicke as himself

Episode chronology
← Previous "Natural History"	Next → "Blitzgiving"
- How I Met Your Mother season 6

"Glitter" is the ninth episode of the sixth season of the CBS sitcom How I Met Your Mother, and the 121st episode overall. It aired on November 15, 2010.

== Plot ==
When Lily becomes obsessed with babies, Robin becomes distant from her. Meanwhile, Barney has found a disc he calls "Robin Sparkles 3", which contains Space Teens, a variety series involving two Canadian teenagers, Robin Sparkles and Jessica Glitter (Nicole Scherzinger), using math to solve crimes presented by Alan Thicke. The group see that much of the Space Teens dialogue is laden with innuendo, which Robin denies. When conversation turns to why the group has never met Jessica if she and Robin were such good friends, Robin abruptly reveals that she has not spoken to Jessica in five years and attempts to drop the subject. When Robin leaves the apartment, Ted discovers a Christmas card Jessica sent to Robin with a picture of Jessica's baby. Ted speculates that Robin dumped Jessica as a friend when Jessica got pregnant, which upsets Lily, who fears that Robin will do the same to her.

When Lily continues to talk about having a baby, Robin becomes fed up with her and the two of them fall out, which upsets Marshall. Marshall takes Lily to see Jessica, who works as the organist for the New York Rangers at Madison Square Garden. Jessica reveals that it was she who stopped being friends with Robin, not the other way around, because motherhood meant she no longer had the time to maintain their friendship. Jessica has considered getting back in touch with Robin, but never had the courage to try.

Lily finds Robin at The Hoser Hut and they reconcile; Robin reveals that she has been afraid that Lily will abandon her once she becomes pregnant like Jessica did, while Lily promises not to talk about babies so much. Jessica, who has come to the Hoser Hut as well, sings the Beaver Song from Space Teens and Robin joins her, rekindling their friendship.

Meanwhile, Robin and Jessica's estrangement prompts Ted to contact his old high school friend Punchy, who appears in New York. Punchy's male bonding with Ted irks Barney, who tells Ted that Punchy has to go. When Ted tells Punchy that he has to go back to Cleveland, Punchy said he thought Ted sounded depressed when he called and his girlfriend encouraged him to visit. Punchy tells Ted he is getting married and asks him to be his best man, an offer Ted gladly accepts.

== Critical response ==
Zach Oat of Television Without Pity gave the episode a B+ score, saying it added more material into Robin's origins but also upped viewer frustration to her being secretive on certain issues. He noted that Punchy's offer to Ted as best man fuels speculation that the wedding in "Big Days" is Punchy and Kelly's, and is set in Cleveland.

The A.V. Club's Donna Bowman, on the other hand, graded the episode at A−, citing "season six-style" fan service to previous episodes and further detail on the characters' friendship, but noted excessiveness on Barney's reality-show catchphrases.

Robert Canning of IGN gave the episode a rating of 8.5 out of 10.

Chris O'Hara of TVFanatic.com gave the episode a rating of 4 out of 5.

Brian Ford Sullivan of The Futon Critic rated this episode as 27th on their list of the 50 Best Television Episodes of 2010.
