= Last Words (How I Met Your Mother) =

- How I Met Your Mother episode
- Episode no.: Season 6 Episode 14
- Directed by: Pamela Fryman
- Written by: Carter Bays; Craig Thomas
- Production code: 6ALH14
- Original air date: January 17, 2011

Guest appearances
- Danny Strong as Trey Platt; Suzie Plakson as Judy Eriksen; Bill Fagerbakke as Marvin Eriksen Sr.; Chris Elliott as Mickey Aldrin; Ray Wise as Robin Scherbatsky, Sr.

Episode chronology
← Previous "Bad News"	Next → "Oh Honey"
- How I Met Your Mother season 6

"Last Words" is the 14th episode of the sixth season of the American television sitcom How I Met Your Mother. The episode was written by series creators Carter Bays and Craig Thomas, and was directed by Pamela Fryman. It originally aired on January 17, 2011, on CBS to an audience of 10.51 million viewers. Upon airing, the episode received generally positive reviews from critics for its comedy and subject matter; it has received thematic analysis from several writers.

How I Met Your Mother follows Ted Mosby (Josh Radnor) and his group of friends in New York City. "Last Words" focuses on Marshall Eriksen (Jason Segel) as he mourns the death of his father (Bill Fagerbakke). Concurrently, Lily (Alyson Hannigan) continues to try to win over the affection of Judy. Suzie Plakson and Chris Elliott reprise their roles as Marshall's mother and Lily's father, respectively. Eric Braeden was set to reprise his role as Robin's father but pulled out, causing a clash between him and Neil Patrick Harris; the role was recast as Ray Wise.

== Plot ==
The gang travel to St. Cloud, Minnesota, to attend the funeral of Marshall's father Marvin. Marshall's mother, Judy, keeps herself distracted and has not eaten or slept in two days. Lily offers to help Judy, which results in Judy yelling at her before taking a nap. Robin accidentally gives alcohol to Marshall's teenaged cousin, however Lily takes the blame allowing Judy to vent all her emotions. Finally, an exhausted Judy eats and rests. Meanwhile, Ted and Barney attempt to make Marshall laugh by showing him funny videos.

The pastor, Marshall's childhood bully Trey, arrives and states the theme is "last words". However, Marshall is reluctant to tell his story as his last conversation with his father was about renting Crocodile Dundee 3, while the stories told by his family are very touching and inspiring. After charging his phone, Marshall discovers that he has a voicemail from his father. Wary about listening to the message, he asks the gang what their father's last words to them would be; they realize that none of them would have anything special to say.

During the service, after hearing stories told by Judy, Marcus, and Marvin Jr., Marshall's turn to speak at the memorial service comes. He impulsively goes out to hear his father's message, which appears to be a pocket dial. An outraged Marshall says how much his father meant to him and how unfair it is that his last message to him was a "pocket dial". However, as he continues to rant, Marvin's voice jokes about mistakenly calling him, telling Marshall that he enjoyed his visit before saying "I love you". He keeps his father's real message private and instead tells everyone that the last thing his father said to him was to rent Crocodile Dundee 3. Judy thanks Lily for helping her throughout the service, resolving their strained relationship. After reflecting on the service, Ted, Lily, and Robin call their fathers to have meaningful conversations with them. Meanwhile, Barney calls his mother and tells her that he is ready to meet his father.

== Production ==
"Last Words" was written by series creators Carter Bays and Craig Thomas. It was directed by Pamela Fryman who directed nearly every episode of the series, and was the fourteenth episode of the season to be filmed. The closing moments of the episode feature Barney attempting to contact his absent father; Barney's father had first been mentioned in How I Met Your Mother's second season. The character, later named Jerome Whittaker, was formally introduced later in the season in "Legendaddy".

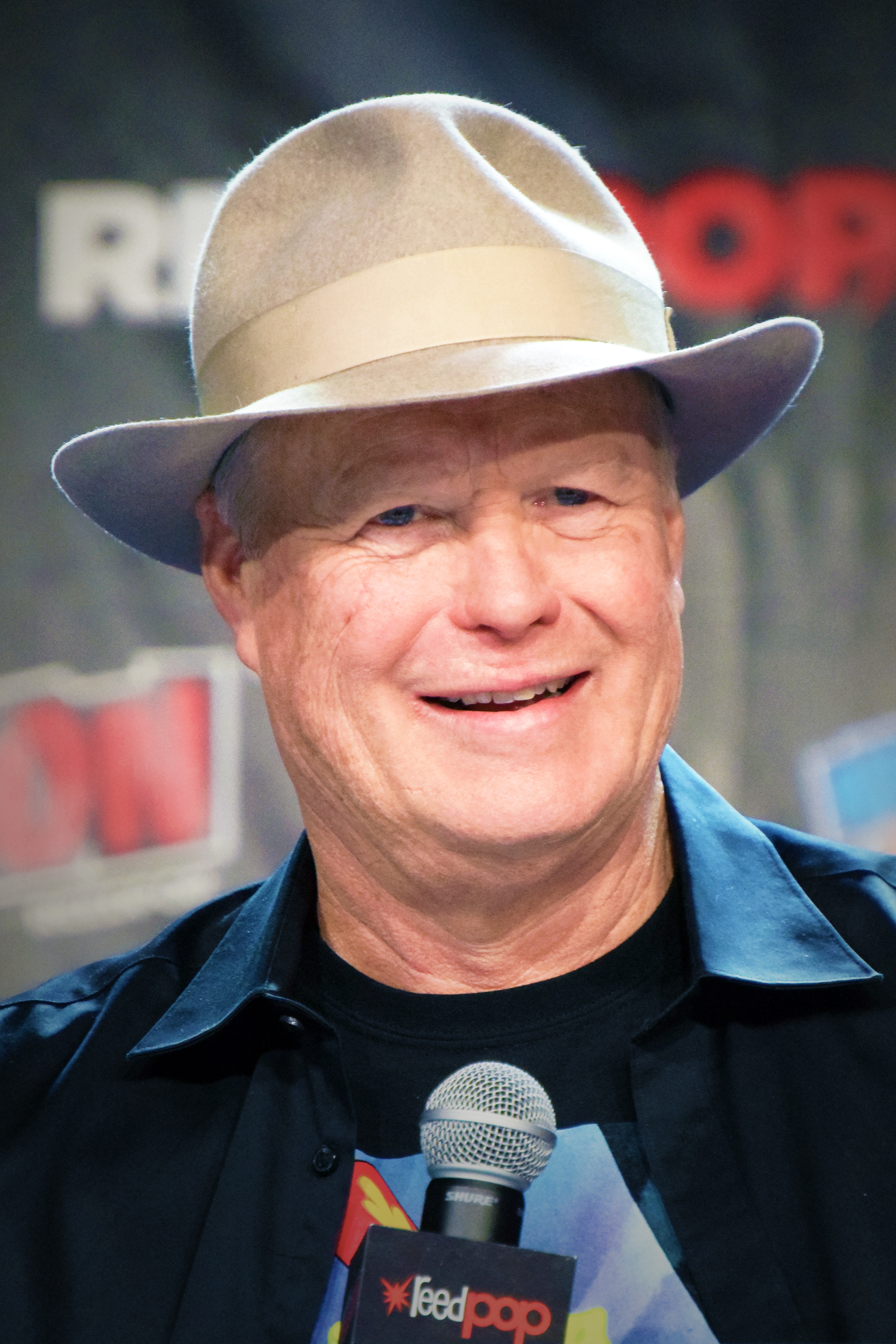
Bill Fagerbakke at the 2022 New York Comic Con

"Last Words" stars Jason Segel as Marshall Eriksen, alongside Josh Radnor as Ted Mosby, Neil Patrick Harris as Barney Stinson, Alyson Hannigan as Lily Aldrin, and Cobie Smulders as Robin Scherbatsky. Bill Fagerbakke appears in flashbacks as Marvin Erikson. Despite killing off his character, Bays stated the producers had plans to have Fagerbakke reprise his role in future episodes through flashback sequences. Fagerbakke returned in a later season six episode, "Desperation Day", as a hallucination. The character's final appearance was in the season nine episode "Sunrise".

Suzie Plakson and Chris Elliott reprise their roles as Marshall's mother Judy and Lily's father Mickey, respectively. Danny Strong guest stars as Marshall's childhood bully Trey. According to Harris, Eric Braeden was set to reprise his role as Robin Scherbatsky Sr, Robin's father, but backed out at the last minute, claiming that his cameo appearance was not "substantial" enough. The character was recast as Ray Wise who remained in the role through the remainder of the series. Harris publicly criticized Braeden's decision over Twitter calling him a "D-Bag". Braeden told Deadline Hollywood that while he enjoyed working on the series, he ultimately pulled out as he felt overworked with his role on the soap opera The Young and the Restless. He noted that he had never met Harris while working on How I Met Your Mother. In a statement to The Hollywood Reporter, he described Harris as a "little boy" who "needs to be spanked".

== Analysis ==
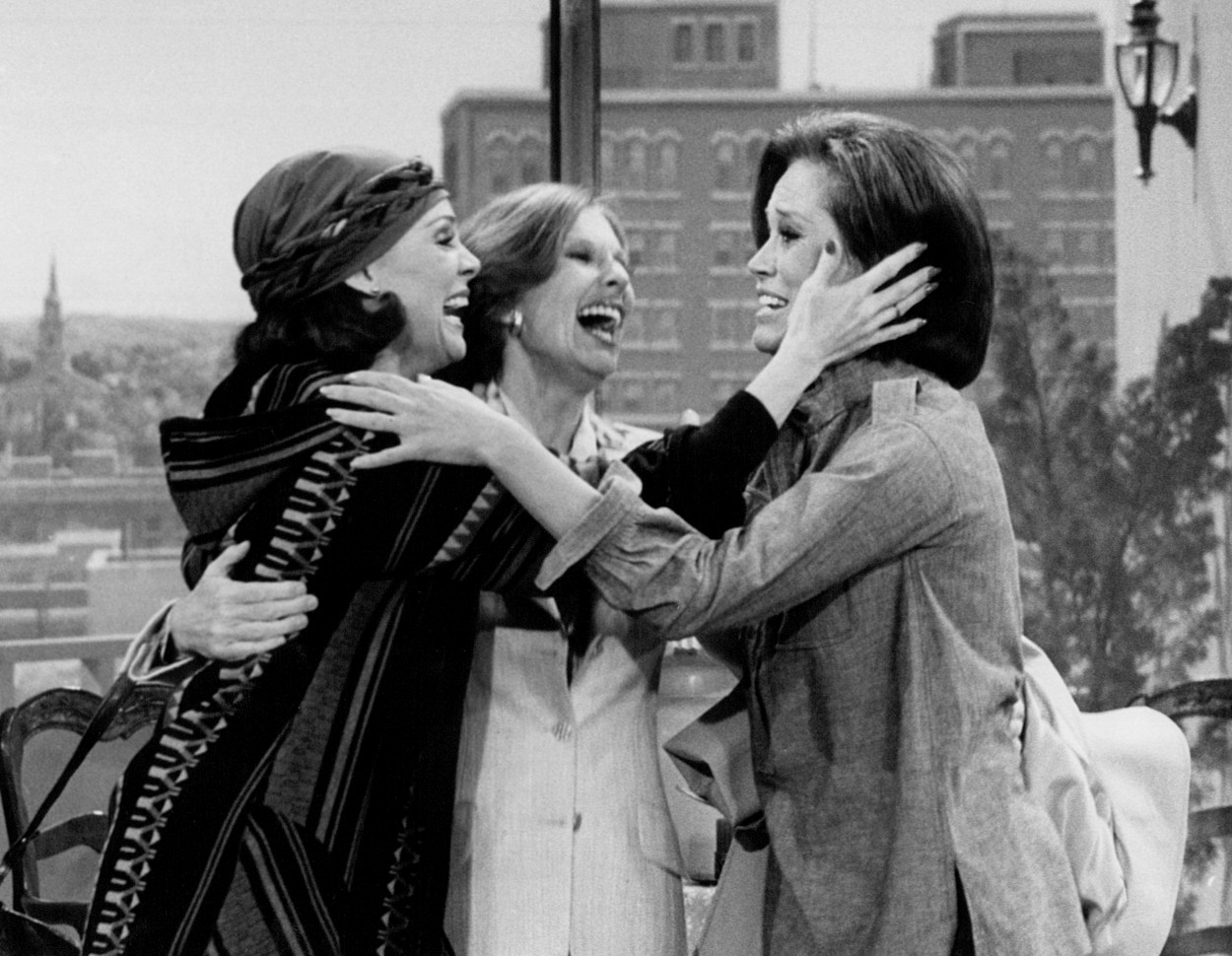
The episode's overall impact on the series has been compared to an episode of The Mary Tyler Moore Show.

The main theme of the episode is how quickly death can come, as seen by the abrupt reveal of Marshall's father dying at the end of the previous episode, "Bad News", and how soon the funeral comes in the series' timeline. Author Elize de Mul felt the episode represented how looking for "linear narrative[s]" in life could be worthless in the long run. She asserts that Marshall's struggle to come up with meaningful last words showcases how the series was able to differentiate itself from other sitcoms—which are more likely to not discuss such serious topics—and instead uses unique types of storytelling like this to get its theming of identity and purpose across. Henry Hanks of CNN.com's Marquee Blog compared the episode's humor and impact on the series to that of The Mary Tyler Moore Show episode "Chuckles Bites the Dust"—about the titular character of Chuckles dying, which used lighthearted humor to make jokes at the expense of a serious topic like death—and the first episode of NewsRadio to air after Phil Hartman's death in 1998. The episode contains much darker undertones than what is expected from the series, yet critic Erin Strecker, writing for Entertainment Weekly, felt this tonal switch was symbolic of how the series was able to blend slapstick humor and "a hit to the heart".

== Reception ==
"Last Words" was first aired on CBS in the United States on January 17, 2011, to an audience of 10.51 million viewers with a 3.9/9 share among adults 18–49. It was the most viewed broadcast in its 8 pm timeslot and fifth highest of the night overall. It marked an increase in viewership from the previous episode, "Bad News", which drew in 10.15 million viewers, the previous season high.

=== Critical reception ===
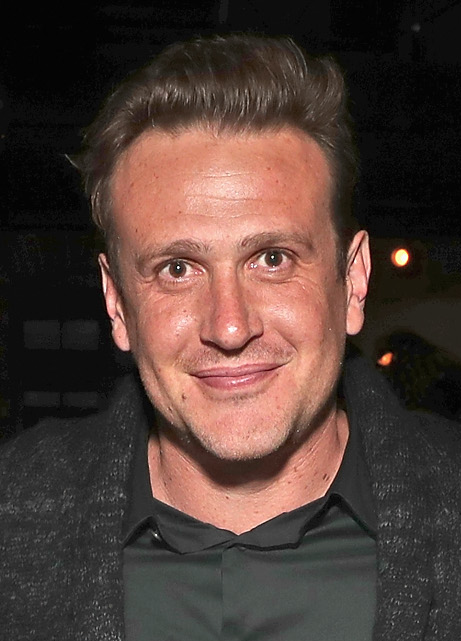
Jason Segel at the 2017 Sundance Film Festival in Utah

"Last Words" met with generally positive reviews from critics. Donna Bowman of The A.V. Club gave the episode an A, noting it "unpretentious, unobtrusive, funny, balanced, and shot through with genuine feeling and unexpected grace". Robert Canning of IGN rated the episode a 8.5 out of 10. He said the episode built on the momentum from "Bad News" and enjoyed the storyline, however he felt Barney and Ted's subplot was relatively weak. By contrast, Bowman found the subplot to feature the episode's best moment.

DeAnn Welker of Television Without Pity graded the episode at A. In a review by the staff of Time, the episode was praised for the realistic premise and for "not backing down" from a serious topic. However, they felt the episode had a strong ending, they felt the plot had "some rough patches". While they felt that the episode's major running gags were well done, Danny Strong's character was unfunny and the cutaway gag involving Nathan Hale was boring. Writing for Vulture, Phoebe Reilly praised the episode's handling of the subject matter, noting it easily could have felt hollow. However, she criticized some of the episode's gags, Strong's role in particularly, as being overdone.
