= How I Met Your Mother season 6 =

How I Met Your Mother
- Season 6
- Season 6 DVD cover art
- Starring: Josh Radnor; Jason Segel; Cobie Smulders; Neil Patrick Harris; Alyson Hannigan
- No. of episodes: 24

Release
- Original network: CBS
- Original release: September 20, 2010 – May 16, 2011

Season chronology
- ← Previous; Season 5 Next → Season 7

The sixth season of How I Met Your Mother, an American sitcom created by Carter Bays and Craig Thomas, premiered on CBS in the United States on September 20, 2010, and concluded on May 16, 2011.

== Production ==
=== Development ===
Following the premiere of the 100th episode, CBS announced in early 2010 that it had renewed How I Met Your Mother for a sixth season.

=== Casting ===
Jennifer Morrison revealed in an interview that she was contracted for 10 episodes but felt that it was likely she would appear in more.

Co-executive producer Craig Thomas said the issue about the identity of Barney's real father was already a plot point in the initial conceptualization of the series. John Lithgow was the first choice to play Jerome Whittaker and the producers gave him a collection of specific episodes detailing Barney's father issues (including "Showdown") to help him get acquainted with the role. Thomas said Lithgow will still appear in future episodes, as the role would complicate Barney's connection with Nora.

== Cast ==
=== Main cast ===
- Josh Radnor as Ted Mosby
- Jason Segel as Marshall Eriksen
- Cobie Smulders as Robin Scherbatsky
- Neil Patrick Harris as Barney Stinson
- Alyson Hannigan as Lily Aldrin
- Bob Saget (uncredited) as Future Ted Mosby (voice only)

=== Recurring cast ===
- Lyndsy Fonseca as Penny, Ted's Daughter
- David Henrie as Luke, Ted's Son
- Marshall Manesh as Ranjit
- Bob Odenkirk as Arthur Hobbs
- Jennifer Morrison as Zoey Pierson
- Laura Bell Bundy as Becky
- Kyle MacLachlan as The Captain
- Bill Fagerbakke as Marvin Eriksen Sr.
- Ned Rolsma as Marcus Eriksen
- Suzie Plakson as Judy Eriksen
- Chris Romano as Punchy
- Nazanin Boniadi as Nora

=== Guest cast ===
- Maury Povich as himself
- Rachel Bilson as Cindy
- Frances Conroy as Loretta Stinson
- Wayne Brady as James Stinson
- Ben Vereen as Sam Gibbs
- Will Forte as Randy Wharmpess
- Nicole Scherzinger as Jessica Glitter
- Alan Thicke as himself
- Jorge Garcia as Steve Henry / The Blitz
- Alex Trebek as himself
- Kaylee DeFer as Casey
- Danny Strong as Trey Platt
- Michael Gross as Alfred Mosby
- Ray Wise as Robin Scherbatsky, Sr.
- Katy Perry as Honey
- Alexis Denisof as Sandy Rivers
- John Lithgow as Jerome Whittaker
- Robbie Amell as Scooby
- Michael Trucco as Nick Podarutti
- Dave Foley as Jake Bloom

== Episodes ==
Season six episodes
No. overall	No. in season	Title	Directed by	Written by	Original release date	Prod. code	US viewers (millions)
113	1	"Big Days"	Pamela Fryman	Carter Bays & Craig Thomas	September 20, 2010	6ALH01	8.79
Ted and Barney argue about who has "dibs" on a hot girl at the bar while Marshall's closeness with his father and desire to start a family gets him into trouble with Lily.
114	2	"Cleaning House"	Pamela Fryman	Stephen Lloyd	September 27, 2010	6ALH02	9.00
The gang comes to help Barney's mom move out of her home, so unravel startling revelations about him. Meanwhile, Ted gets upset when Robin oversells him to a blind date.
115	3	"Unfinished"	Pamela Fryman	Jamie Rhonheimer	October 4, 2010	6ALH03	8.60
Goliath National Bank revives its headquarters project but Ted wants no part of it after what happened to him the last time. Barney tries to convince him of giving it a second chance by using all of his best womanizing tactics. Robin's post-breakup depression leads her to drunk-dial Don.
116	4	"Subway Wars"	Pamela Fryman	Chris Harris	October 11, 2010	6ALH04	8.48
Robin vows to convince the gang she is a "real" New Yorker, despite their teasing to the contrary, since she hails from Canada. When Woody Allen is spotted in a downtown restaurant, Robin and the gang rush to see the quintessential New Yorker.
117	5	"Architect of Destruction"	Pamela Fryman	Carter Bays & Craig Thomas	October 18, 2010	6ALH05	8.05
Ted is confronted by a beautiful girl named Zoey (Jennifer Morrison) who's upset about the landmark to be torn down to make way for the new GNB headquarters he's designing.
118	6	"Baby Talk"	Pamela Fryman	Joe Kelly	October 25, 2010	6ALH07	8.29
Marshall and Lily study the ways of conception. Robin's frustration with her overbearing co-anchor, Becky, continues to grow.
119	7	"Canning Randy"	Pamela Fryman	Chuck Tatham	November 1, 2010	6ALH06	8.88
Zoey sits in at Ted's class and gets his students on her side of the fight to save the hotel being torn down for the new GNB headquarters. Ted, Marshall and Barney see Robin in a Halloween "parade". Marshall has problems with his assistant Randy and how GNB treats people.
120	8	"Natural History"	Pamela Fryman	Carter Bays & Craig Thomas	November 8, 2010	6ALH09	8.87
When the gang goes to a black-tie event at the Natural History Museum, Ted gets introduced to Zoey's husband, The Captain. Barney and Robin dare each other to break the laws of the museum by touching all of the exhibits.
121	9	"Glitter"	Pamela Fryman	Kourtney Kang	November 15, 2010	6ALH08	8.87
The gang learns about Jessica Glitter (Nicole Scherzinger), a friend of Robin's from her pop-star days as Robin Sparkles, thanks to a new tape Barney discovers about a Canadian children's show.
122	10	"Blitzgiving"	Pamela Fryman	Theresa Mulligan Rosenthal	November 22, 2010	6ALH10	8.73
An old college friend (Jorge Garcia) with a mean streak of bad luck celebrates Thanksgiving with Lily, Robin, Marshall, and Barney. Ted, who cooked a surprise feast for the gang, celebrates the occasion instead with Zoey.
123	11	"The Mermaid Theory"	Pamela Fryman	Robia Rashid	December 6, 2010	6ALH11	9.26
When Ted's new friendship with Zoey tests the theory that single men and married women can't be friends, he invites her husband, "The Captain," to hang out with them. Meanwhile, Marshall and Robin decide to spend alone time together, and Barney and Lily possibly have a fight.
124	12	"False Positive"	Pamela Fryman	Craig Gerard & Matthew Zinman	December 13, 2010	6ALH12	9.70
After hearing startling news of Lily being pregnant, everyone must reflect on their lives. Robin becomes newly employed and Ted must do a few things because he is Punchy's best man. Meanwhile, Barney tries to get into the Christmas spirit.
125	13	"Bad News"	Pamela Fryman	Jennifer Hendriks	January 3, 2011	6ALH13	10.15
Marshall and Lily see a reproduction specialist out of fear she will never get pregnant while Marshall's parents pay him a surprise visit. Their quest results in both good and bad news. Robin is made a laughing stock at her new job.
126	14	"Last Words"	Pamela Fryman	Carter Bays & Craig Thomas	January 17, 2011	6ALH14	10.54
The gang consoles Marshall as they all return to Minnesota upon learning of his bad news. Marshall's experiences inspire everyone, causing Barney to muster the courage to find his father.
127	15	"Oh Honey"	Pamela Fryman	Carter Bays & Craig Thomas	February 7, 2011	6ALH15	10.00
Barney opens up about himself and his father to Zoey's cousin, Honey (Katy Perry). Ted, whom Zoey had tried to pair up with Honey, confesses to the group his feelings for Zoey.
128	16	"Desperation Day"	Pamela Fryman	Tami Sagher	February 14, 2011	6ALH16	9.51
The gang tries to finalize their plans for Valentine's Day with less than 24 hours to go. Lily faces the prospect of spending the day without Marshall. Robin spends the holiday with her co-workers while Barney tries to take advantage of dateless women.
129	17	"Garbage Island"	Michael Shea	Tom Ruprecht	February 21, 2011	6ALH17	9.33
Marshall becomes obsessed with saving the environment, and The Captain returns.
130	18	"A Change of Heart"	Pamela Fryman	Matt Kuhn	February 28, 2011	6ALH19	9.24
Barney realizes he has heartfelt attraction for Nora (Nazanin Boniadi) and he thinks that something is wrong with him. Robin dates a guy who acts like a dog.
131	19	"Legendaddy"	Pamela Fryman	Dan Gregor & Doug Mand	March 21, 2011	6ALH18	8.03
Barney and his father, Jerome Whittaker (John Lithgow), meet for the first time as father and son. The rest of the gang are struggling with certain issues.
132	20	"The Exploding Meatball Sub"	Pamela Fryman	Stephen Lloyd	April 11, 2011	6ALH20	6.87
Marshall finally leaves GNB to join an environmental organization – which does not sit well with Barney and Lily. The GNB headquarters project drives another wedge between Ted and Zoey.
133	21	"Hopeless"	Pamela Fryman	Chris Harris	April 18, 2011	6ALH22	6.49
In an attempt to bond with his father, Barney asks the gang to embellish their histories with him by adding fake details to their lives. Robin runs into a guy she had a crush on when she and Ted were dating.
134	22	"The Perfect Cocktail"	Pamela Fryman	Joe Kelly	May 2, 2011	6ALH21	6.77
Marshall and Barney begin to argue over GNB's demolition of the Arcadian Hotel, and it's up to Robin and Lily to help them make up using cocktails. Ted plans a romantic weekend away for him and Zoey.
135	23	"Landmarks"	Pamela Fryman	Carter Bays & Craig Thomas	May 9, 2011	6ALH24	6.41
The gang finally tells Ted what they really feel about Zoey, which drives him to make an important decision.
136	24	"Challenge Accepted"	Pamela Fryman	Carter Bays & Craig Thomas	May 16, 2011	6ALH23	7.15
Robin and Barney meddle in Ted's relationship but things get more complicated when Barney sees Nora again. An incident makes Marshall think he could get sick with food poisoning. Ted pushes ahead with being best man at a very important wedding. Lily discovers that she is pregnant.
