= Legendaddy (How I Met Your Mother) =

- How I Met Your Mother episode
- Barney Stinson (Neil Patrick Harris) attempts to steal JJ's basketball hoop while Jerry Whittaker (John Lithgow) tries to understand why he's disappointed to meet him. The scene was praised by critics who noted the chemistry between Lithgow and Harris.
- Episode no.: Season 6 Episode 19
- Directed by: Pamela Fryman
- Written by: Dan Gregor; Doug Mand
- Production code: 6ALH18
- Original air date: March 21, 2011

Guest appearances
- John Lithgow as Jerome "Jerry" Whittaker; Marieve Herington as Betty; Michael Rupnow as Scott; Nancy Travis as Cheryl Whittaker; Will Shadley as JJ Whittaker

Episode chronology
← Previous "A Change of Heart"	Next → "The Exploding Meatball Sub"
- How I Met Your Mother season 6

"Legendaddy" is the 19th episode of the sixth season of the American sitcom How I Met Your Mother. The series revolves around Ted Mosby (Josh Radnor) and his group of friends in New York City as he recounts to his children the story of how he met their mother. The episode was directed by Pamela Fryman and written by series co-creator Dan Gregor and Doug Mand. It first aired on CBS on March 21, 2011, to an audience of 8.03 million viewers. The episode received positive reviews by critics who praised the performances of Neil Patrick Harris and guest star John Lithgow.

"Legendaddy" follows Barney Stinson (Harris) as he reconnects with his father Jerome "Jerry" Whittaker (Lithgow) who abandoned him as a child. Meanwhile Marshall Eriksen (Jason Segel) attempts to get his friends to treat him like they did prior to his father's death. Barney having an absent father had a plot point first established in the second season, the introduction of Jerry was first teased earlier in the sixth season in the closing moments of "Last Words". Lithgow was the first choice to play the character; he reprised his role later in season six and season nine.

== Plot ==
The gang finds that Barney's television is broken, and, after learning he does not know how to use tools, calls a repairman to fix it. However, instead of the repairman, Barney is greeted at the door by Jerome "Jerry" Whittaker, his father who left him as a child. Jerry tells Barney that he received his letter and wants to reconnect. The two get together at MacLaren's Pub. Later, Barney relates to the gang his meeting with Jerry, claiming he is a tour manager who loves Scotch, suits, and loose women as much as he does. However, Jerry reveals to the rest of the gang that he is actually a driving instructor with a normal suburban life. He tells them that during the actual meeting with Barney he attempted to impress him but failed miserably leading to Barney "ghosting" him.

The gang tries to convince Barney to see his father, but he refuses saying they will never speak again. Marshall tells Barney that he will never speak to his deceased father again, but Barney can still speak with his. Barney reluctantly agrees to have dinner with Jerry's family and meets Jerry's wife, Cheryl, and his son JJ. Barney acts antagonistically toward JJ until he learns that JJ stands for Jerome Junior. Upset, Barney abruptly leaves and Jerry follows him to the garage, where Barney is attempting to steal the basketball hoop attached to it. When Barney expresses his resentment that Jerry is nothing more than "some lame suburban dad", Jerry asks why this upsets him. Barney admits he is still hurt because Jerry had never been the responsible father he needed in his childhood. Jerry apologizes for abandoning Barney and helps him remove the hoop while teaching him how to use a screwdriver. Barney goes back to Ted's house with the gang and gifts him the hoop, urging him to save it for his future kids saying, "A kid needs a hoop."

Meanwhile, the gang begins to note all of the things that each of them never learned. Marshall is the only one whom the gang does not mention, and he eventually asks the gang to pick on him. He reveals that he is aware that the gang has been careful around him ever since his father died, (Note: As depicted in "Bad News") and says that he just wants to feel normal again.

== Production ==
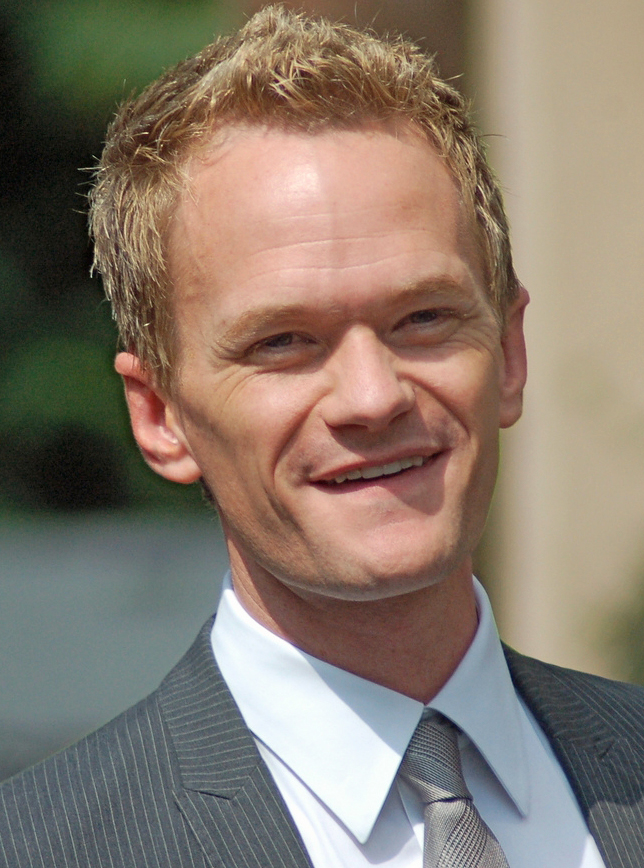
"Legendaddy" centers around Neil Patrick Harris's (pictured) character Barney Stinson as he attempts to reconnect with his absent father.

"Legendaddy" was written by Dan Gregor and Doug Mand; it was directed by Pamela Fryman, who directed nearly every episode of the series. It was Mand's first writing credit on the series. The episode stars Neil Patrick Harris as Barney Stinson, alongside Josh Radnor as Ted Mosby, Jason Segel as Marshall Eriksen, Alyson Hannigan as Lily Aldrin, and Cobie Smulders as Robin Scherbatsky. John Lithgow and Nancy Travis guest star as Barney's absent father Jerome Whitaker and his wife Cheryl, respectively. Both Lithgow and Travis had previously starred on other sitcoms.

The introduction of Barney's father had been setup prior in the season. In the closing moments of "Last Words", Barney called his mother to ask about his father. Later, Barney sent him a letter. In an interview with the Los Angeles Times, series co-creator Craig Thomas stated the issue about the identity of Barney's real father was already a plot point in the initial conceptualization of the series. Barney's father had first been mentioned in How I Met Your Mother's second season. Lithgow was the first choice to play Jerome Whittaker, and the producers gave him a collection of episodes detailing Barney's father issues to help him get acquainted with the role. Thomas said Lithgow would reprise his role in future episodes, and that the character would complicate Barney's connection with his girlfriend Nora. Lithgow later returned in episode 21 of season six, "Hopeless", where he further attempts to reconnect with Barney.

== Release ==
"Legendaddy" first aired in the United States on CBS on March 21, 2011, to an audience of 8.03 million viewers. It had a 3.0/9 share among adults 18–49. The episode was down around 1.10 million viewers from "A Change of Heart", the previous episode, It was viewed by around 1.06 million more than "The Exploding Meatball Sub", the following episode. "Legendaddy" finished eighth of the night overall just below Harry's Law on NBC but above Mad Love on ABC. In Australia, the episode aired on May 12, 2011, on Seven Network to an audience of 712 thousand viewers, 41 thousand more than the previous episode.

=== Critical reception ===
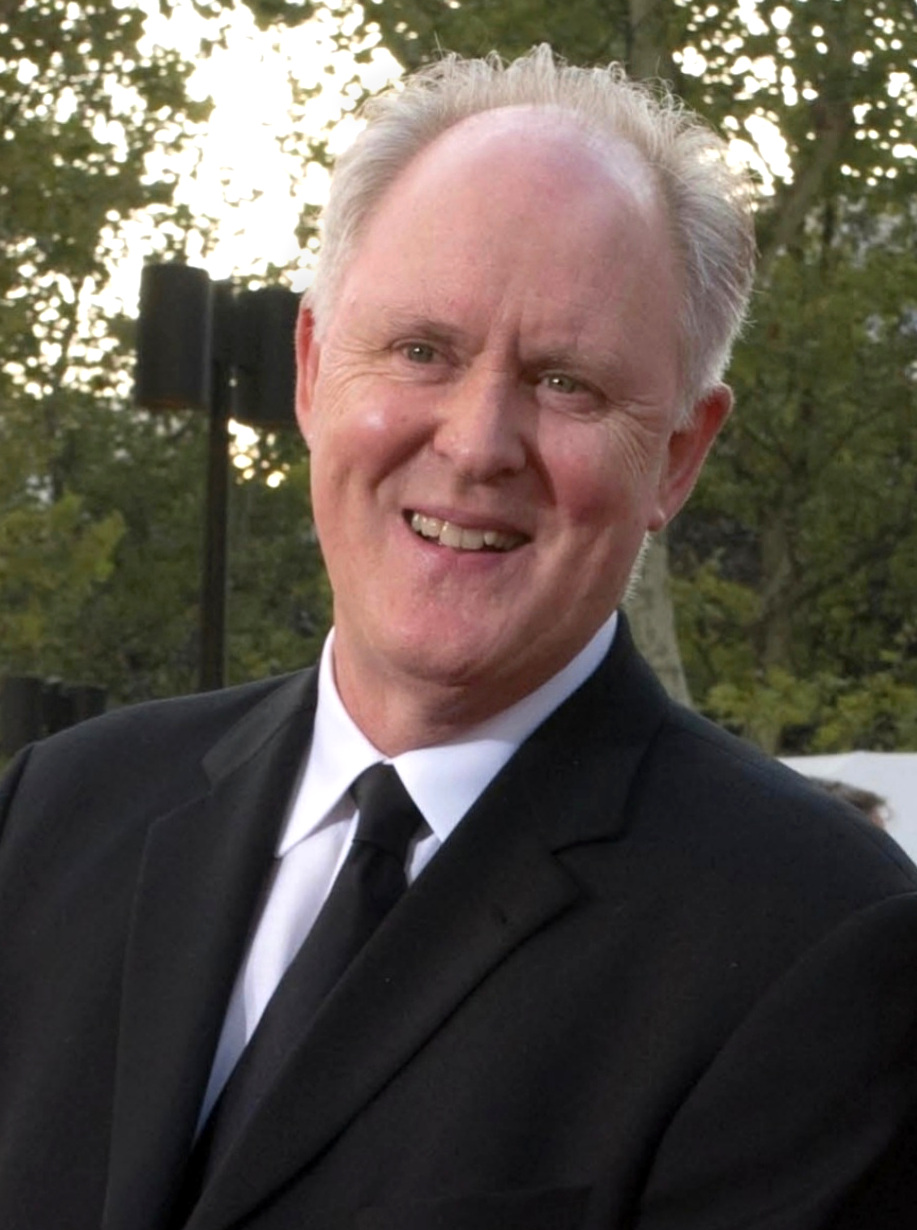
John Lithgow's (pictured) acting was highly praised by critics.

Donna Bowman of The A.V. Club gave the episode a B. She felt that the episode was a disappointment and failed to meet the excitement generated by the associated promotional material. Still, Bowman did praise Barney and Marshall's character development. Zach Oat of Television Without Pity gave the episode at B+ rating.

Robert Canning of IGN rated the episode an 8 out of 10. While he felt the plot was somewhat formulaic, Canning praised the narrative, particularly the performance of Lithgow and Harris. He labeled the b-plot as a highlight of the episode, noting how it was consistent with How I Met Your Mother's continuity, writing, "it was Barney's screwdriver gap in knowledge that drove the rest of the episode for Ted, Robin, Marshall and Lily. I've said before that its our knowledge of these characters and their history that make storylines like this work." Writing for Entertainment Weekly, Ken Tucker felt Lithgow's performance elevated the episode. Tucker noted how Lithgow gave a distinct performance, particularly his mannerisms, in both versions of the MacLaren's scene showcased his range. A number of reviews also praised the scene where Barney attempts to steal the basketball hoop, especially the emotional performances of Harris and Lithgow.

In a 2023 ranking for Collider, Neha Rawani labelled the episode the fourth saddest of the series, below season six's "Bad News" and above season nine's "Last Forever". She specifically called attention to the acting between Harris and Lithgow. In a 2025 ranking for How I Met Your Mother's 20th anniversary, Andrew McGowan of Variety listed "Legendaddy" as the 16th best episode of the series.
