= Cleaning House =

- How I Met Your Mother episode
- Episode no.: Season 6 Episode 2
- Directed by: Pamela Fryman
- Written by: Stephen Lloyd
- Production code: 6ALH02
- Original air date: September 27, 2010

Guest appearances
- Ben Vereen as Sam Gibbs; Frances Conroy as Loretta Stinson; Wayne Brady as James Stinson; Riley Thomas Stewart as Young Barney; Michael Earl Reid as Post Master General

Episode chronology
← Previous "Big Days"	Next → "Unfinished"
- How I Met Your Mother season 6

"Cleaning House" is the second episode of the sixth season of the CBS sitcom How I Met Your Mother, and the 114th episode overall. It originally aired on September 27, 2010.

== Plot ==
Barney is with the gang at MacLaren's and tells them they will be helping him move his mother's belongings out of his childhood home. Despite their protests, he convinces them and they meet Barney's mother, Loretta, and brother, James, at the house in Staten Island. They find evidence of his lonely childhood, covered up by Loretta's lies. Lily finds a basketball jersey, and Barney tells the gang that he was asked by the coach to quit the team because he was too good. James backs Barney; but when he is out of earshot, tells them that Barney was awful, but their mother covered it up with the story. James was lied to with a white glove sent from Michael Jackson for his 10th birthday. Barney accepts the delusions, until he and his brother find an un-mailed letter to a "Sam Gibbs", with a photo of them, with the words "your son" on the back. Loretta desperately tries to lie out of it, resorting to yelling, making James distrust her even more and Barney believe her even more. James eventually snaps and yells at Barney, begging him to stop living in a fantasy world and accept that all the lies Loretta told them, like Bob Barker being his father, are false.

The gang heads over to the address. An older black man answers the door. James realizes that Sam is his father, and the two embrace, crying. But Barney joins the hug, under the impression that this man is his father. He then proceeds to feed into the idea that he is African-American. Back at his mother's house, Barney sits in his room with Loretta who gives him a note to the identity of his father. Barney puts together all the work his mother did for him as a child to make him happy. Barney tears up the note and realizes that she's all the father he'll ever need.

Robin tells Ted that she has been promoting him to a make-up artist at work, but when she describes his selling points, Ted is worried that she oversold him. She sends a series of text messages to try to balance out this faux pas, which Ted becomes upset about since he believed that the things Robin had texted were too horrible. Robin receives a text from the woman which says she is still interested in meeting Ted. Ted then asks Robin why would the woman still want to meet him after all of the bad things that Robin had told her and realizes that Robin has possibly oversold the woman to him.

== Critical response ==
Donna Bowman of The A.V. Club gave the episode an A− score. She said that while the episode had no real innovations aside from recurring characters and meeting relatives for the very first time, Barney's acceptance of the truth was not long in coming. She also took note of the way Barney joined in the duet between James and his father. James Poniewozik of Time noted Barney's attempts to feel like a black man with respect to Sam and James was akin to the behavior of Navin Johnson, Steve Martin's character in the film The Jerk. Robert Canning of IGN gave the episode a rating of 6.5 out of 10. DeAnn Welker of Television Without Pity gave the episode a C+ score, saying there was not much of a storyline for the other four main characters.
