= Hopeless (How I Met Your Mother) =

- How I Met Your Mother episode
- Episode no.: Season 6 Episode 21
- Directed by: Pamela Fryman
- Written by: Chris Harris
- Production code: 6ALH22
- Original air date: April 18, 2011

Guest appearances
- John Lithgow as Jerry Whittaker; Michael Trucco as Robin's Secret Crush; Will Shadley as J.J. Whittaker

Episode chronology
← Previous "The Exploding Meatball Sub"	Next → "The Perfect Cocktail"
- How I Met Your Mother season 6

"Hopeless" is the 21st episode of the sixth season of the CBS sitcom How I Met Your Mother and the 133rd episode overall. It aired on April 18, 2011.

== Plot ==
The episode starts with Barney and his father, Jerry, parting in 1983 after his mother Loretta forbids them further contact due to Jerry's wild lifestyle. In 2011, Barney is disappointed in Jerry's normal suburban lifestyle, and is reluctant to pursue any further contact. However, when Jerry invites Barney to go fishing with him and his son JJ, Barney resolves to take his dad out to lead him back to his old "party hard" lifestyle. He creates alternate identities for the group so as to impress Jerry: Marshall is a playwright in an open marriage with Lily, while Robin and Ted are dating.

The next night, the group meets Jerry at MacLaren's where, after a brief discussion on which club to head to, which leads to a confusing exchange as all the clubs they name are named after normal words, like Lame and Okay, a reference to the Abbott and Costello comedy sketch Who's on First?. They ultimately decide on one called Hopeless. Jerry is reluctant to drink, as he is going fishing with JJ the next day, but finally agrees and begins downing several shots. Jerry and Barney have a great time, eventually roaming the streets of New York and pulling various pranks, such as picking a fight with a heavyset biker and yanking out a parking meter, but are eventually arrested after Jerry throws up on a police car.

As they sit handcuffed on the curb, Jerry reveals that he was in fact never drunk, having only pretended to take the shots, while the various pranks really did not happen: due to Barney's drunkenness, he could not tell Jerry was faking, and it was Barney who had thrown up. Jerry wanted to hang out with Barney while at the same time showing him he cannot keep partying forever. However, because Jerry is also an aspiring magician, like Barney, they manage to free themselves from the handcuffs, and head back to Jerry's house, getting a ride with one of Jerry's driving students so that he can make it on time for the fishing trip.

On the ride back, Barney asks Jerry how he managed to settle down and live a "normal" life, and confides that someday he too wishes to settle down. Jerry declines to reveal his secret, but advises Barney to first meet the right girl. Barney says that maybe he has already met the right girl. When they arrive at the house, Jerry produces a memento from their last day together when Barney was a kid: the "Legalize It" button they had gotten together, and expresses how much it meant to him over the intervening years. Barney then decides to go fishing with Jerry and JJ.

Meanwhile, Marshall and Lily make a bet to see who can pick up five numbers from people at the club the fastest, with either winner getting to have sex in the bathroom. Lily ends up winning, though Marshall claims to have won "the race" of the prize. Robin runs into an old crush of hers at the club; before she has a chance to ask him out, Ted claims to be dating her, to keep up the ruse for Jerry. Robin had met the man several years before at a clothing store; Ted realizes he and Robin had been dating at the time, and promptly decides to announce to everyone in the club that he and Robin are to get married, ruining any chance Robin has with the man. Robin points out Ted's hypocrisy as had only bought his red cowboy boots that day because another woman had told him he would look good in them. As the gang head home, Lily apologizes for Robin's secret crush not working out. Robin replies that it is okay, and maybe it was not meant to be. Lily asks her why she is smiling and she says she does not know. Meanwhile, Robin's crush talks to someone on his cell phone saying that he met "that" girl again and that she is engaged to Ted. Future Ted hints there would be more between them later.

== Reception ==
Donna Bowman of the A.V. Club graded the episode an A−. She stated that the episode has moments that are part of people's transformation into married adults, and Barney's moments with his father are a step in the right direction, while praising John Lithgow's acting as definitive of the episode.

Henry Hanks of CNN.com's Marquee blog stated the episode was a "great example" of emotional arcs filling up the show.

Vlada Gelman of Showtracker.com said the episode dropped clues about the wedding seen in "Big Days" and added speculation as to whether Robin or Nora is the "right girl".

Robert Canning of IGN rated the episode 8.5 out of 10, saying that the episode paid homage to the history of the series and added much laughs in the process.

This is the second least viewed episode of the entire series, and only earned 6.49 million viewers.
