= The Perfect Cocktail =

- How I Met Your Mother episode
- Episode no.: Season 6 Episode 22
- Directed by: Pamela Fryman
- Written by: Joe Kelly
- Production code: 6ALH21
- Original air date: May 2, 2011

Guest appearances
- Jennifer Morrison as Zoey Pierson; Bob Odenkirk as Arthur Hobbs

Episode chronology
← Previous "Hopeless"	Next → "Landmarks"
- How I Met Your Mother season 6

"The Perfect Cocktail" is the 22nd episode of the sixth season of the CBS sitcom How I Met Your Mother and the 134th episode overall. It was aired on May 2, 2011.

== Plot ==
In the cold open, Future Ted narrates that when Marshall resigned from GNB, his boss Arthur Hobbs asked to be put as his character reference when applying for a new job at an environmental organization. However, the organization rejects his application, revealing that Hobbs gave them negative feedback by recalling his supposed unprofessionalism and stories about his disdain for the environment (including clubbing a seal with an even cuter seal). Marshall returns to GNB to confront Hobbs and runs into Zoey, who offers him a job as her group's lawyer.

At MacLaren's, Barney hands out invitations to the Arcadian's demolition. Zoey introduces Marshall as her lawyer, which upsets Barney because he helped Marshall land a job at GNB in the first place. He launches a prank war against Marshall by doing questionable disgusting things to anything Marshall's mouth touches and sending photographs to him. Marshall retaliates by ruining Barney's hookups at the bar over several days, for instance by pretending to be a doctor and telling Barney he had crabs with "super-herpes". The pranks go too far and Carl bans them both from the bar, as well as Lily and Robin, who were irritated by a woman lurking by their booth for a chance for her and her friends to sit there.

Meanwhile, Ted goes off to spend the weekend out of town with Zoey at Martha's Vineyard. When Lily tells him what happened between Marshall and Barney, he confronts Zoey while on the road, despite an agreement to never talk about the Arcadian, and told her that it was okay for her to disrupt his own plans, but seeing his friends turn on each other was too much. Ted proposes that if Zoey can spend one night in the decrepit hotel, she will have him on her side to save it from demolition, a proposal which Zoey accepts. Ted asks her why saving the Arcadian was so important to Zoey. She reveals that she grew up in the hotel as a child, and its destruction would see part of her identity gone with it. When they see the cockamouse creep around the room and discover its offspring, Zoey admits defeat and they spend the night at Ted's apartment.

Distraught by the rift, Lily and Robin decide to have Marshall and Barney make up using various drinks and discover that certain party drinks trigger various situations — daiquiris makes Marshall narcissistic, red wine brings out Barney's self-pitying side, while absinthe makes Robin hallucinate and martinis exacerbate Lily's attraction to Robin. Armed with this knowledge, the two plan a drinking binge for Marshall and Barney by ordering drinks in such a way that they would get angry at each other first, then eventually reconcile. However, while the plan is underway, Marshall and Barney drink tequila shots and return to MacLaren's, where Barney tries to hit on a lesbian and Marshall eats chicken wings while smoking. The two forgive each other after Carl gives them beer and he lifts the ban on the four. However, a round of champagne that Lily ordered results in Marshall and Barney blacking out and resuming their feud at Ted's apartment the next morning, which is only worsened when Ted tells them he is on Zoey's side as well. Seeing their plan go to waste, Robin suggests that she and Lily drink absinthe, which puts them in a dream-like state.

The last scene of the episode shows Lily and Robin pulling a prank on the women who stole their booth. When Barney's assistant shows the women a photograph, they scramble out of the bar in disgust. Lily and Robin immediately come back to clean up the booth.

== Reception ==
Reviews of the episode were mixed.

The A.V. Club's Zack Handlen gave the episode a B−, stating the prank war was funny, but the execution of the drink gag was not well-timed.

Lindsey Bahr of Atlantic Monthly said it had "fast-paced energy" that the Zoey and Ted angle spoils, and nothing is resolved by the end of the episode.

James Poniewozik of Time said the episode was a "single, extended running gag."
