= Subway Wars =

- How I Met Your Mother episode
- The gang running off to find Woody Allen
- Episode no.: Season 6 Episode 4
- Directed by: Pamela Fryman
- Written by: Chris Harris
- Production code: 6ALH04
- Original air date: October 11, 2010

Guest appearances
- Marshall Manesh as Ranjit; Maury Povich as himself; Geoff Stults as Max; Laura Bell Bundy as Becky; Jan Bryant as Mildred

Episode chronology
← Previous "Unfinished"	Next → "Architect of Destruction"
- How I Met Your Mother season 6

"Subway Wars" is the fourth episode of the sixth season of the American sitcom How I Met Your Mother, and the 116th episode overall. The episode was written by Chris Harris and directed by Pamela Fryman.

The series follows main character Ted Mosby (Josh Radnor) and his group of friends in New York City. The frame story features a future version of Ted recounting stories to his children. In "Subway Wars", the main characters race to see who can get to Downtown New York the fastest.

"Subway Wars" originally aired on CBS on October 11, 2010, to an audience of 8.48 million viewers. It was met with positive reviews from critics and was nominated for Outstanding Directing for a Comedy Series at the 63rd Primetime Emmy Awards.

== Plot ==
Marshall learns that celebrity Woody Allen has been spotted at a restaurant downtown. He and his friends debate on the fastest way to get to the restaurant and decide to race each other there: Ted rides the bus, Lily takes the subway, Robin opts to hail a cab, Marshall to run there on foot, and Barney fakes a heart attack to take an ambulance to a hospital next to the restaurant. His plan backfires, however, when the ambulance takes him to a hospital uptown, and he is forced to contact Ranjit for a ride. Meanwhile, Lily misinterprets the subway conductor's announcement that the subway is undergoing maintenance, and soon after exiting the train, it departs. Marshall is at first enthusiastic and confident that he can outrun everyone, though he soon begins to lose energy while on foot. Robin fails to enter a car so she joins Barney in Ranjit's car. During the ride, Robin angrily reveals to Barney that she had tried to talk to him about how low she was feeling recently due to her break-up with Don and feeling shunned and forgotten due to her overly-enthusiastic new co-anchor, yet Barney ignored her and tried to use her as a decoy while he eyed up a woman at the bar. Barney apologises to Robin, but she is not interested and leaves the car.

Robin takes the subway, where she sees a poster up for her news show, with her co-anchor's face taking up much more space than hers. Enraged, she rips it down, only to see an older poster behind it with one of her and Don and breaks down crying. Lily spots her and comforts her, though she quickly abandons her and calls Ranjit in favor of the race. Lily has Ranjit pick up Marshall on the way, and the two discuss their concerns: Lily had been feeling dejected after having been unable to conceive a baby with Marshall for two months, and Marshall was feeling the same, believing it to be his fault. They then agree there is really no rush to become parents, and abandon the race. Ted, Barney, and Robin race for the finish; however, Barney trips, taking Ted down with him and allowing Robin to win the race. Future Ted reveals he knew that Barney had intentionally tripped as he had spotted Robin crying earlier.

== Production ==
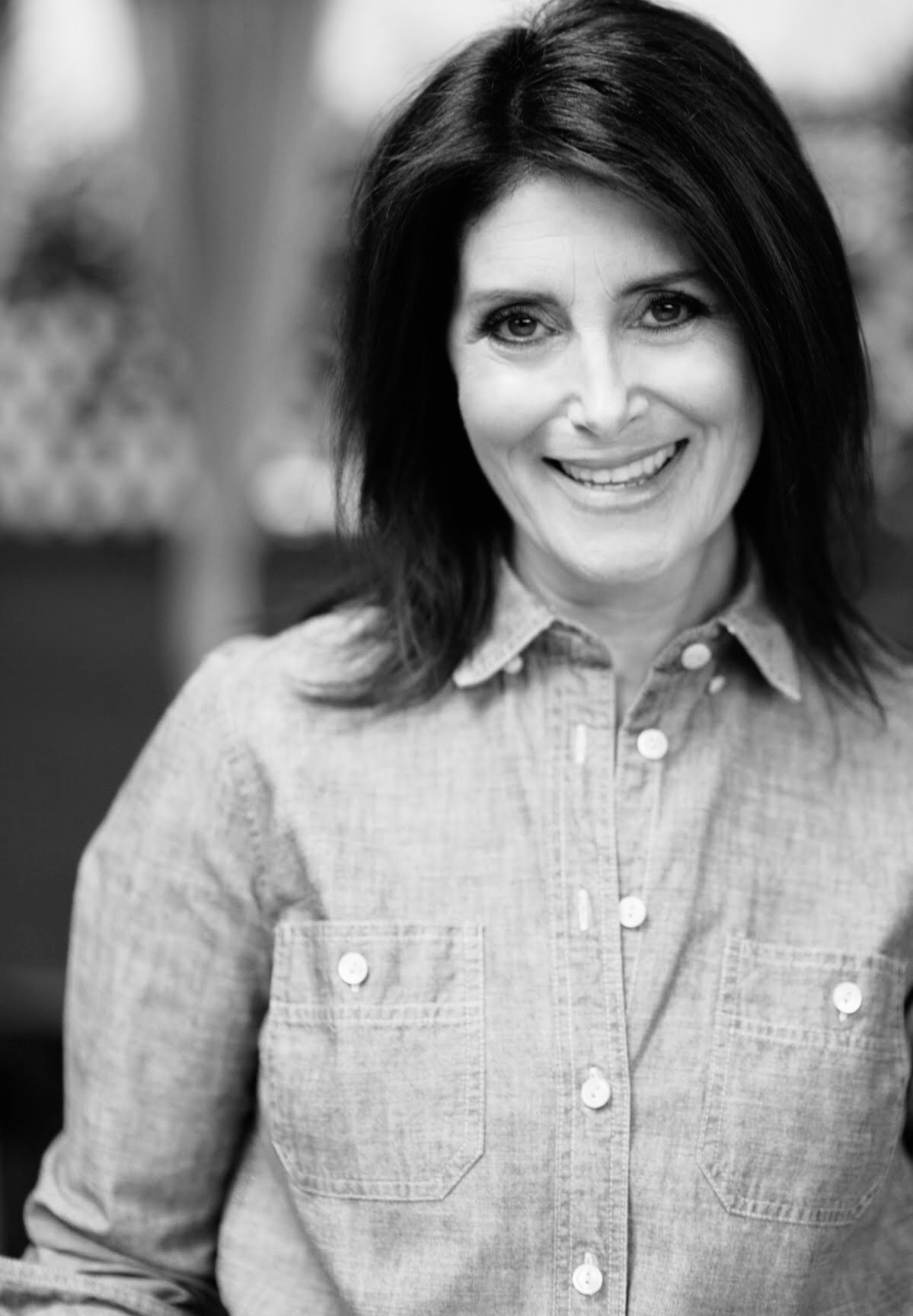
Pamela Fryman directed the episode

"Subway Wars" was written by Chris Harris and directed by Pamela Fryman. In an interview with Vulture series co-creator Craig Thomas, revealed that he and Carter Bays were interested in shooting the episode on location in New York City, but the episode, like the majority of the series, ended up being filmed on various sound stages in Los Angeles, California. Despite this, the episode makes various references to the New York City setting. Thomas described the premise of the episode as being a mix of The Cannonball Run and The Amazing Race. "Subway Wars" is mostly self contained, featuring very few references other episodes. However, it does progress some of the various plots of the show's sixth season, including Lily and Marshall attempting to have a child, and Robin getting over her break up.

"Subway Wars" features series regulars Josh Radnor as Ted Mosby, Jason Segel as Marshall Eriksen, Neil Patrick Harris as Barney Stinson, Alyson Hannigan as Lily Aldrin, and Cobie Smulders as Robin Scherbatsky. Marshall Manesh also appears in a recurring role as Ranjit. The episode featured the running gag of television personality Maury Povich appearing as himself in seemingly random locations. The original song "Marshal vs The Machines" appears in the episode sung by Segal, in character as Marshall. An alternate version of the song appeared in the ninth season. The song was later released on the compilation album How I Met Your Music (2012); which was later made available via music streaming service in 2019.

== Broadcast ==
"Subway Wars" originally aired on October 11, 2010, on CBS. During its American broadcast, the episode was viewed live by an estimated 8.48 million viewers. The episode received the sixth highest viewership of the night overall, just below House but above Two and a Half Men. "Subway Wars" had around 150,000 less viewers from the previous episode. and had around 430,000 more than the following episode. In Australia, the episode aired on Seven on February 10, 2011, to an audience of 874,000 viewers, and was the 11th most-viewed program of the night. It was released alongside "Unfinished", which it beat in ratings by around 160,000 viewers.

== Reception ==
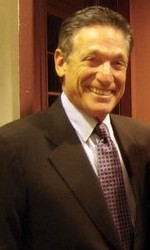
Maury Povich's inclusion was met with mixed reception.

"Subway Wars" was met with positive reviews from critics, who praised the episode's premise, comedy, and overall plot. Povich's inclusion was met with mixed reception. The episode was somewhat poorly received on social media. Screen Rant's Mariana Fernandes noted it was one of the higher rated episodes of the season on IMDb. Donna Bowman from The A.V. Club gave the episode a B+ rating. Bowman praised the chaotic nature of the episode's plot and liked the episode's humor and the various running gags, although she criticized the degree of which Povich appeared. In contrast, Tiana Flores from Screen Rant praised Povich, opining that the more he appeared, the funnier the joke became.

Robert Canning of IGN gave the episode a rating of 9 out of 10. Canning praised the episode for continuing various plotlines, noting that it easily could have avoided furthering the plot. DeAnn Welker of Television Without Pity gave the episode a B+ score. The Atlantic's Lindsey Bahr opined that the episode was "mostly silly, occasionally amusing, and surprisingly clever." Writing for Uproxx, Alan Sepinwall felt "Subway Wars" was significantly better than the previous episode, believing that while "Unfinished" was disappointing, "Subway Wars" left him feeling "pleasantly surprised". For her work on the episode, director Pamela Fryman was nominated for Outstanding Directing for a Comedy Series at the 63rd Primetime Emmy Awards. She lost the award to Michael Spiller for his work on the Modern Family episode "Halloween".
