= Baby Talk (How I Met Your Mother) =

- How I Met Your Mother episode
- Episode no.: Season 6 Episode 6
- Directed by: Pamela Fryman
- Written by: Joe Kelly
- Production code: 6ALH07
- Original air date: October 25, 2010

Guest appearances
- Laura Bell Bundy as Becky; Matt Boren as Stuart; Virginia Williams as Claudia; Bill Fagerbakke as Marvin Eriksen Sr.; Suzie Plakson as Judy Eriksen; Emily Wilson as Marshall's Daughter

Episode chronology
← Previous "Architect of Destruction"	Next → "Canning Randy"
- How I Met Your Mother season 6

"Baby Talk" is the sixth episode of the sixth season of the American sitcom How I Met Your Mother, and the 118th episode overall. It aired on October 25, 2010. It was directed by Pamela Fryman and written by Joe Kelly.

It first aired in the United States on CBS to an audience of 8.29 million viewers. The episode was met with praise from critics.

== Plot ==
Marshall and Lily visit Stuart and Claudia, who are having trouble naming their newborn baby. When Claudia and Stuart leave the room, Marshall and Lily both come up with names for the baby, although the names are different. They both decide that to solve this problem, they would both come up with names and present them to the other later on. Marshall comes up with boy names that Lily rejects because of her past experiences with trouble-making kindergarten boys and Lily comes up with girl names that Marshall rejects because of his experience with a hot girl and a stripper. A future fantasy has an older Barney hitting on and subsequently marrying their daughter. Marshall, worried that it might be a girl, consults his father on how to ensure that it will be a boy while Lily has been searching for ways to make sure it will be a girl. When they found out, they realize that they have no control over the gender and decide to give him/her the gender-neutral name Jamie. Lily rejects the name later because of a troublemaker named Jamie.

Becky, Robin's new, overly cheery co-anchor at Come On, Get Up New York! reveals that she is dating Ted. Robin takes issue with Ted dating a girl who uses baby talk, while Ted, Barney, and Marshall defend girls using baby talk as a way for men to feel more manly and protective. Robin states that women would never fly with a man using baby talk, and Barney tries and fails the baby talk play. Robin discovers Ted finds dependent girls attractive and was put off by Robin's independence and assertiveness. Robin asks Barney if he felt needed during their relationship; Barney reassures her, saying he thought her independence was awesome. Robin then pointed out a crazy woman in his apartment—she had approached Barney as he was indulging himself in ice cream, and seduced him after he responded to her in a childish manner. Barney asks Robin to help him get rid of the woman, and Robin grabs Barney's decorative sword and heads into the bedroom.

At the end of the episode, Ted and Becky are in a park, and as Becky licks an ice cream cone, Ted notices her shoe is untied and bends down to tie it. He then notices a nearby father tying his daughter's shoe and breaks up with Becky.

== Production ==
"Baby Talk" was written by Joe Kelly and directed by Pamela Fryman. The episode serves as the conclusion to the cliff hanger ending of "Architect of Destruction".

"Baby Talk" features series regulars Josh Radnor as Ted Mosby, Jason Segel as Marshall Eriksen, Neil Patrick Harris as Barney Stinson, Alyson Hannigan as Lily Aldrin, and Cobie Smulders as Robin Scherbatsky.

== Broadcast ==
"Baby Talk" first aired in the United States on CBS to an audience of 8.29 million viewers.

=== Critical reception ===
"Baby Talk" was met with positive reviews from critics. DeAnn Welker of Television Without Pity gave the episode a score of A−. The A.V. Club's Donna Bowman gave the episode a B+ rating. Robert Canning of IGN gave the episode a rating of 7.5 out of 10. Chris O'Hara of TVFanatic.com gave the episode a rating of 5 out of 5.
