= The Mermaid Theory =

- How I Met Your Mother episode
- Episode no.: Season 6 Episode 11
- Directed by: Pamela Fryman
- Written by: Robia Rashid
- Production code: 6ALH11
- Original air date: December 6, 2010

Guest appearances
- Jennifer Morrison as Zoey Pierson; Kyle MacLachlan as George "The Captain" Van Smoot; Tamara Lynn Davis as Iris

Episode chronology
| ← Previous "Blitzgiving" | Next → "False Positive" |
- How I Met Your Mother season 6

"The Mermaid Theory" is the 11th episode of the sixth season of the CBS sitcom How I Met Your Mother, and the 123rd episode overall. It aired on December 6, 2010. The episode hints at future events, which are elaborated in the Season 7 episode "Now We're Even".

== Plot ==
Ted tells the group Zoey has invited them to an art gala, though only Ted expresses interest. Lily cautions Ted on hanging out alone with a married woman. Ted dismisses Lily's concerns but when out with Zoey she tells her husband, The Captain, that she is "out with friends" instead of specifically mentioning Ted causing him to become concerned.

In an attempt to straighten things out, Ted agrees to spend an evening with the Captain and Zoey on their boat, but on arrival Zoey is ill requiring Ted to be alone with the Captain. Ted suspects the Captain knows he has been hanging out with Zoey and fears he will be murdered. When Ted prepares to escape, the boat hits a bump and Ted falls in the water. After being brought back on the boat, Ted admits his fears. The Captain says he is glad Zoey has found a new friend and they agree to be friends. Ted and Zoey meet up later and both agree that they should stop hanging out if either begins to develop feelings for the other.

During these events, Marshall and Robin have dinner together, having realized they have never really spent much time alone. The dinner is initially awkward until Marshall reveals that the reason he doesn't spend much time alone with Robin is due to Barney's "Mermaid Theory", that the longer you spend time with someone the more likely you will want to sleep with them. Barney claimed the theory comes from the fact that sailors used to picture manatees as mermaids due to long periods without female contact. Marshall and Robin both get drunk and enjoy the evening, though when they return to the apartment, Marshall begins seeing Robin as a mermaid. When she throws up all over the floor, however, Marshall once again sees her as a manatee, much to his relief.

Throughout the episode Future Ted struggles to remember the details of an argument between Barney and Lily after Lily rebuffs Barney's offer to hang out with her. The argument continues at the bar with several plot holes, including motorcycles coming in out of nowhere and Barney's and Lily's mismatched personalities. Eventually, Future Ted remembers that this relates to events much later than the rest of the episode when Lily is pregnant. Lily is offended when Barney tells her he views her as a manatee now that she is pregnant. The argument is resolved when Barney tells Lily that she can become a mermaid again when she begins breastfeeding. They reconcile, after which Ted walks in wearing a green dress proclaiming "now we're even!", which Future Ted states is the ending of a "totally different story".

== Critical response ==
Donna Bowman of The A.V. Club gave the episode a B+ rating.

Robert Canning of IGN gave the episode a rating of 8 out of 10.
