= Tamara Rey =

Cuban American actress and writer

Tamara Rey (born Tamara Camille Fernandez 19 February 1989) is a Cuban American actress and writer.

== Personal life ==
Rey was raised in Sugar Land, Texas by her mother and father. She has one older sister, Renee, a graphic designer who lives in Austin, Texas. Her younger sister, Sabrina, is a nurse.

Before moving to Los Angeles, Rey became an active member of the Chi Omega fraternity and attended the University of Texas at Austin, majoring in Radio, Television and Film.

== Career ==
Rey started her career using the name Tamara Camille in CSI: Crime Scene Investigation. In 2011, Rey landed a role in the How I Met Your Mother episode "The Exploding Meatball Sub".

Since moving to Los Angeles, she has starred in television shows such as Parenthood and Shameless, along with feature films including Best Friends Forever, and Fight to the Finish.

== Filmography ==
Year	Film	Role	Episodes
2011	CSI: Crime Scene Investigation	Lanetta	All That Cremains
2011	How I Met Your Mother	Woman in bed with Barney	The Exploding Meatball Sub
2011	J.A.W.	Grayson Summers	
2011	Brisk	Ally	
2012	Shameless	Le Club Lady	Summertime
2013	Best Friends Forever	Olivia	
2013	Tiesto: "Take Me" ft. Kyler England	Tamara	
2013	Parenthood	Lincoln	It Has to Be Now
2014	Fight to the Finish	Melissa Gaines	
2015	Ranger Danger	Suzy the Final Girl	
