= Blitzgiving =

- How I Met Your Mother episode
- Episode no.: Season 6 Episode 10
- Directed by: Pamela Fryman
- Written by: Theresa Mulligan Rosenthal
- Production code: 6ALH10
- Original air date: November 22, 2010

Guest appearances
- Jennifer Morrison as Zoey Pierson; Jorge Garcia as Steve Henry / The Blitz

Episode chronology
| ← Previous "Glitter" | Next → "The Mermaid Theory" |
- How I Met Your Mother season 6

"Blitzgiving" is the tenth episode of the sixth season of the American sitcom How I Met Your Mother, and the 122nd episode overall. It aired on CBS on November 22, 2010, to an audience of 8.73 million viewers. It was written by Theresa Mulligan Rosenthal and directed by Pamela Fryman. The episode was met with praise from critics, who enjoyed the gimmick of guest star Jorge Garcia's character.

"Blitzgiving" features Ted Mosby's (Josh Radnor) friend Steve Henry (Garcia), also known as The Blitz, a man who is "cursed" to miss notable events, celebrating Thanksgiving with the gang. Ted goes to sleep early one night, missing a party attended by the gang alongside his enemy Zoey Pierson (Jennifer Morrison).

== Plot ==
It is the day before Thanksgiving, and Ted is hosting his first Thanksgiving for the group and tries his best to make it memorable. He makes a special turkey by stuffing it with a smaller turkey, calling it a "turturkeykey". Just as he is about to call it an early night, Marshall and the group tell him not to leave the bar, or he will get the curse of "The Blitz". Future Ted explains how an old college friend, Steve Henry, had the curse of The Blitz; whenever he would leave the room with a group, something amazing would happen.

The next morning, Ted wakes up to chaos in his apartment. The place is a mess, and he discovers Zoey sleeping in the bathtub. Lily explains that after Ted left the bar, Zoey came in, and instead of seeking revenge, the group ended up having a great time with her and Steve. Ted soon realizes that he has been hit by the curse of The Blitz, missing out on an unforgettable night. With the oven broken, the gang scrambles to find a place to cook the turkey. Lily recalls that Zoey had invited them over for Thanksgiving since her husband is spending the holiday with his daughter. Meanwhile, Barney, feeling uneasy about possibly being cursed as well, takes a separate cab to Zoey's. He soon realizes he has become "The Blitz" when he learns about a Thanksgiving Day parade they encountered earlier.

At Zoey's apartment, Ted and Zoey argue leading to him comparing her to a fairy-tale evil stepmother, which strikes a nerve. Zoey, hurt, demands they leave. As they walk away, Ted reflects on his insult and realizes it cuts deeper than he intended—Zoey feels rejected by her stepdaughter during the holidays. Understanding her pain, Ted decides to return and ask for her forgiveness, recognizing the importance of family and connection. After dinner, Barney and Steve head towards the elevator. Steve remembers that he forgot his jacket and turns to retrieve it. Just then, a girl from the neighboring apartment darts into the elevator, with Barney inside. As the door closes, her dress gets stuck between the doors and rips apart. Steve realizes that he has been "Blitzed" again.

== Production ==
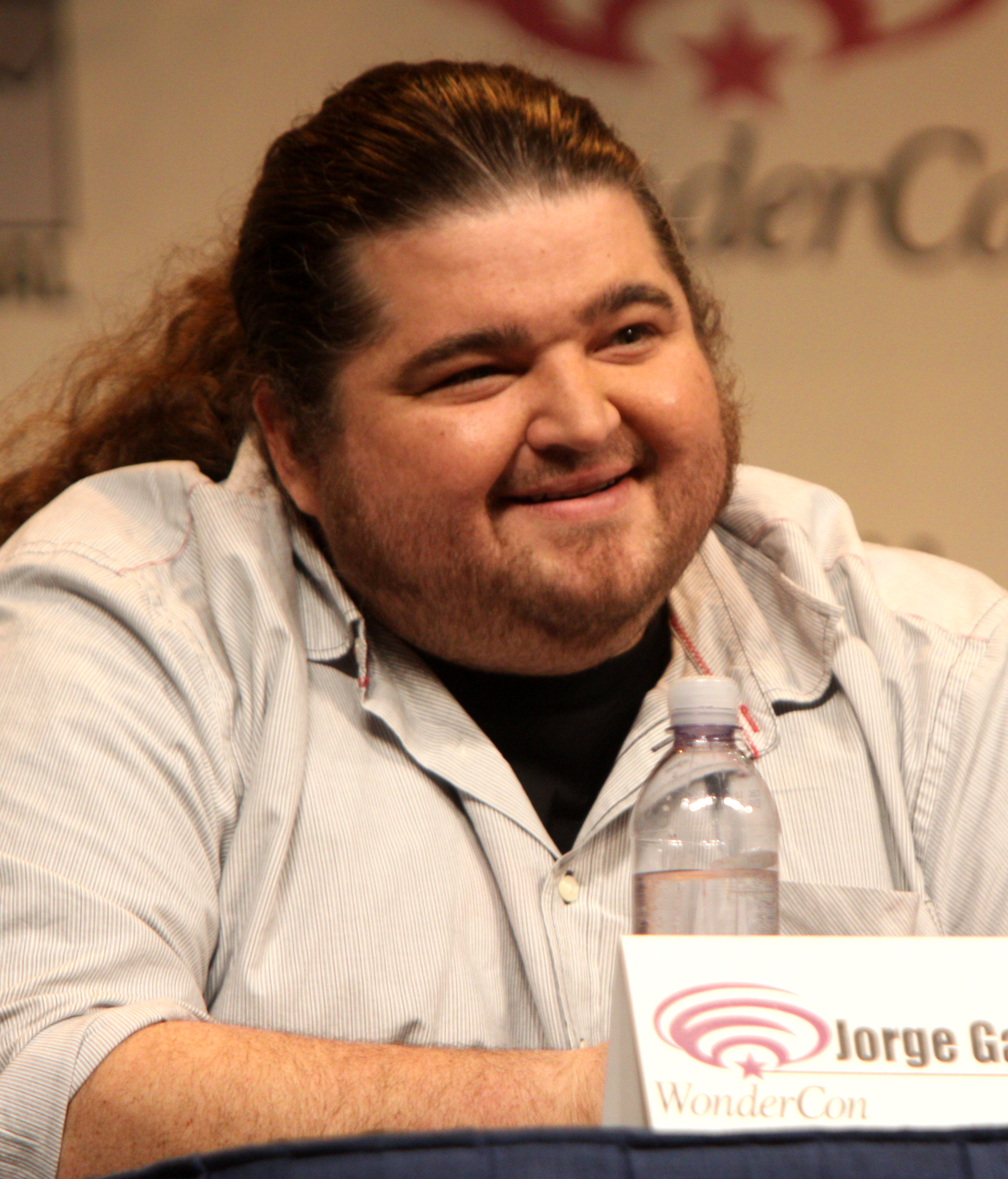
Jorge Garcia speaking at Wondercon in Anaheim, California.

"Blitzgiving" was written by Theresa Mulligan Rosenthal and directed by Pamela Fryman. Fryman was the director for nearly every episode of the series.

"Blitzgiving" stars Josh Radnor as Ted Mosby, alongside Jason Segel as Marshall Eriksen, Neil Patrick Harris as Barney Stinson, Alyson Hannigan as Lily Aldrin, and Cobie Smulders as Robin Scherbatsky. The episode guest stars Jorge Garcia as the titular character Steve Henry / The Blitz. Garcia's role on Lost is referenced in the episode through various lines of dialogue. Additionally, the numbers 4, 8, 15, 16, 23, and 42, which are central to the mythology of Lost, are also mentioned. Garcia later reprised his role as Blitz in a cameo appearance in the closing moments of the ninth season episode "Gary Blauman". Jennifer Morrison appears as the recurring character Zoey Pierson. Following her role as Allison Cameron on the medical drama House, Morrison wanted a more comedic role.

== Release ==
"Blitzgiving" first aired in the United States on CBS on November 22, 2010, to an audience of 8.73 million viewers.

In Australia, the episode was aired alongside "The Mermaid Theory" by Seven Network on March 10, 2011. It was viewed live by 811 thousand viewers, 93 thousand less than "The Mermaid Theory".

=== Critical response ===
"Blitzgiving" was praised by critics. Angel Cohn of Television Without Pity also put the episode at A−, praising the Lost easter eggs included in the episode, as well as showcasing of Garcia's comedic range. Donna Bowman of The A.V. Club graded the episode at A−, praising the story development and the various ideas put in that actually worked together. She also noted similarities between Steve and Garcia's Lost character Hurley Reyes. Robert Canning of IGN gave the episode a rating of 8 out of 10 and praised the episode's humor and casting of Garcia. He praised Morrison's role in the episode, finding that it helped to "humanize" Zoey, making the character more likeable. Canning praised the premise of "The Blitz" but found its accompanying flashbacks to be lackluster while still enjoyable.

In 2019, Screen Rant's Irina Curovic listed Garcia among the best guest stars featured in How I Met Your Mother. In a later 2019 Screen Rant article, Ben Sherlock labeled "Blitzgiving" as the best episode of How I Met Your Mother season six. In 2023, according to Collider's Amy Brown and Ryan Heffernan, the episode was the tenth highest rated of the series on IMDb.
