= False Positive (How I Met Your Mother) =

- How I Met Your Mother episode
- Episode no.: Season 6 Episode 12
- Directed by: Pamela Fryman
- Written by: Craig Gerard; Matthew Zinman
- Production code: 6ALH12
- Original air date: December 13, 2010

Guest appearances
- Chris Romano as Punchy; Alex Trebek as himself; Ben Vereen as Sam Gibbs; Melissa Molinaro as Noelle

Episode chronology
← Previous "The Mermaid Theory"	Next → "Bad News"
- How I Met Your Mother season 6

"False Positive" is the 12th episode of the sixth season of the CBS sitcom How I Met Your Mother, and the 124th episode overall. It aired on December 13, 2010. It features guest star Alex Trebek.

== Plot ==
Ted waits outside a movie theater showing It's a Wonderful Life, carrying a gingerbread house as a Christmas-themed snack. Future Ted explains that, two days earlier, Marshall and Lily received what appeared to be a positive pregnancy test and told Ted, Barney, and Robin, before later learning from the doctor that it was a false alarm.

The news causes the others to reconsider their own choices. Robin, who has been auditioning for a game-show job hosted by Alex Trebek, decides to accept an associate researcher position at World Wide News after Ted criticizes her for abandoning her New Year's Resolution. Barney receives an end-of-year bonus and initially plans to spend it on luxuries, but the pregnancy news makes him briefly decide to donate the money instead. Marshall and Lily, meanwhile, panic about becoming parents and try to prepare their apartment before learning that Lily is not pregnant.

When the group meets outside the theater, Marshall and Lily admit they are relieved and consider getting a dog instead. Robin and Barney also begin retreating from their changed decisions. Ted angrily smashes the gingerbread house and tells each of them to follow through: Marshall and Lily should keep trying to conceive, Barney should give away the money, and Robin should take the World Wide News job. He also pushes Punchy to go through with his wedding after Punchy gets cold feet.

In the end, Marshall and Lily continue trying to conceive, Barney returns his diamond suit and donates money and suits to charity, and Robin begins her first day at World Wide News. Robin later thanks Ted for his outburst, and he accepts her offer to be the best man if she ever marries someone else.

== Critical response ==
Donna Bowman of The A.V. Club gave the episode an A− rating.

Robert Canning of IGN gave the episode a rating of 9.5 out of 10.

DeAnn Welker of Television Without Pity graded the episode an A.

Jordan Cramer of TVOvermind graded the episode B+, highlighting the episodes ending to show Ted's most genuine side, when he finally loses his temper and forces the group to re-examine their choices, this showed more depth and care to Ted's Character on the show.
