= A Change of Heart (How I Met Your Mother) =

- How I Met Your Mother episode
- Episode no.: Season 6 Episode 18
- Directed by: Pamela Fryman
- Written by: Matt Kuhn
- Production code: 6ALH19
- Original air date: February 28, 2011

Guest appearances
- Nazanin Boniadi as Nora; Robbie Amell as Nate "Scooby" Scooberman; Suzy Nakamura as Dr. Kirby

Episode chronology
← Previous "Garbage Island"	Next → "Legendaddy"
- How I Met Your Mother season 6

"A Change of Heart" is the 18th episode of the sixth season of the CBS sitcom How I Met Your Mother and the 130th episode overall. It originally aired on February 28, 2011. After Nora announces her intention to marry and settle down, Barney is worried; meanwhile, Robin's new boyfriend displays idiosyncrasies that remind her friends of a dog.

The episode received a fairly positive reception, with 9.24 million watching the episode when it first aired. Some critics found elements of the plot cheesy, although the plot twist and character interactions were complimented.

== Plot ==
Chastened by Marshall's father's fatal heart attack, the gang all go to get their hearts checked, except Barney, who is too scared to go alone. Lily agrees to accompany him so long as Barney promises her to never lie to his new girlfriend, Nora. When Barney visits the cardiologist, she requests that he wear a heart monitor for 24 hours, citing a possible arrhythmia. The next day, Barney and Lily return to the doctor, who notices some oddities in the readout. She asks Barney what happened at these certain times, and Barney tells the story of the last 24 hours.

At dinner, Barney became worried when Nora began talking about marriage and settling down; he claims he wants the same things. After dinner, Barney blackmails the group into pretending this is true. Nora tells everyone that her parents are in town and invites Barney to meet them the next day. However, Barney admits that he was lying about wanting to get married and Nora slaps him. Lily and the cardiologist also slap him when he tells the story.

Lily insists that Barney genuinely does want to settle down and get married, but when Barney denies this, Lily has the cardiologist check what happened when Barney first saw Nora on their date. They see that Barney's heart literally skipped a beat, which he and Lily interpret as a sign he really wants to settle down. Barney goes to the brunch to tell Nora about his feelings; seeing her with her parents. However, he loses his nerve and leaves before Nora sees him.

Meanwhile, Robin plans to get a dog, but Ted forbids it because he thinks that he will end up caring for it. Instead, based on Marshall's advice, Robin finds a boyfriend. He is nicknamed Scooby, and his behavior closely mimics a dog, which causes the gang to make a series of puns and jokes, to Robin's annoyance. When Robin goes to work, Scooby and the rest of the gang consume marijuana (with Ted replacing it with sandwiches in his story to his kids). While the others are high, Scooby goes missing. They eventually find him urinating on a fire hydrant, only for him to get hit by a car when he runs across the street.

The episode ends with a flashback of an incident involving Marshall in 2006, which explains the event Barney referenced when blackmailing him. Marshall drops a calzone while walking on the street, but picks it up after ensuring that nobody is looking at him. As he takes his first bite, however, he sees Barney nearby and slowly walks away in embarrassment.

== Reception ==
=== Ratings ===
"A Change of Heart" first aired on February 28, 2011, garnering 9.24 million views on CBS and a 5.6/9 Nielsen rating. In Australia, the episode aired on May 5 to an audience of 0.671 million households.

=== Reviews ===
Donna Bowman of The A.V. Club gave the episode a rating of A−, criticizing the episode for being "sappy" but describing herself as "impressed" by the twist ending to the scene with Nora's parents. Angel Cohn of Television Without Pity graded the episode at B−. Robert Canning of IGN gave the episode a rating of 8.5 out of 10, saying that Nora was likeable and that he enjoyed the interaction between the friends, who even managed to make "silly filler plots" enjoyable.
