= Natural History (How I Met Your Mother) =

- How I Met Your Mother episode
- Episode no.: Season 6 Episode 8
- Directed by: Pamela Fryman
- Written by: Carter Bays; Craig Thomas
- Production code: 6ALH09
- Original air date: November 8, 2010

Guest appearances
- Jennifer Morrison as Zoey Pierson; Bob Odenkirk as Arthur Hobbs; Dan Bakkedahl as Curtis; Ted Jonas as Russell; Kyle MacLachlan as George "The Captain" Van Smoot; David Burtka as Scooter

Episode chronology
← Previous "Canning Randy"	Next → "Glitter"
- How I Met Your Mother season 6

"Natural History" is the eighth episode of the sixth season of the CBS sitcom How I Met Your Mother, and the 120th episode overall. It aired on November 8, 2010.

== Plot ==
Ted and the gang are invited to a gala party at the Natural History Museum thrown by George van Smoot, also known as "The Captain". While hobnobbing, Ted sees Zoey, with whom he is angry for writing a column criticizing his work at GNB regarding the Arcadian, describing Ted and his colleagues as "fat cats". At the party, Zoey introduces Ted to her husband, the Captain (Kyle MacLachlan), a wealthy, much older man who is obsessed with boats.

Later, Ted corners Zoey and berates her for the hypocrisy of her column and trying to ruin his career, angrily calling her a "bored trophy wife". At this, Zoey starts crying and tells Ted that she is unhappy in her marriage. Ted immediately feels sorry for her, and he tries to commiserate with her by ranting against GNB and their obnoxious work culture. However, Zoey's tears are a ruse: she had been recording the entire conversation to use against him. The Captain hears about the situation and sympathises with Ted, who replies that despite her betrayal, he respects her activism. The Captain offers to erase the recording, but Ted, surprised that the Captain would betray his own wife, declines the offer. Because of the acoustic capabilities of the museum, Zoey overhears their conversation and is visibly hurt by her husband's words. She and Ted share a dance and she promises she will erase the conversation herself, resolving to play fair from now on.

Meanwhile, Barney pulls various pranks using off-limits exhibits along with Robin. Barney brags about having knocked down the blue whale exhibit as a child, which none of the gang believe. After catching Robin by surprise disguised as an Egyptian pharaoh, a security guard catches them in the act and brings them to the security office. Robin's skepticism about the blue whale incident prompts the security officer to check old records. One file, dated July 23, 1981, recounts the incident in full, but a check of the document reveals that Barney's guardian that day, Jerome Whittaker—who he believed as a child to be his "Uncle Jerry"—identified himself as Barney's father on the visitor form. Barney then reveals to Robin that his mother forbade them further contact soon after this incident. He asks Robin not to mention the discovery to the others.

Marshall tells Lily that GNB has offered him a five-year contract. Lily, however, is still firm on her belief that Marshall will resign and pursue his dream of being an environmental lawyer. In the ensuing argument, Marshall insists on staying in the company for financial reasons, and Lily storms out; she feels he has not stayed true to himself and their values. In another part of the museum, Lily visualizes an exhibit showing extinct "College Marshall" at their old Wesleyan dorm; the same Marshall she first fell in love with. She talks with College Marshall, who tells her that while "Corporate" Marshall may have changed in a few ways, the most important part is that he still loves her. Just then, the real Marshall appears and promises to work hard to provide a stable future for their family. Later, Future Ted reveals that Marshall will leave GNB in the future, with the camera pulling back to reveal an exhibit showing extinct Corporate Marshall.

== Critical response ==
Reviews of the episode have been positive.

Donna Bowman of The A.V. Club gave the episode a B+ score, saying the episode tackled people's thoughts about their past and how they should let things go, which were explained well during the third part.

DeAnn Welker of Television Without Pity gave the episode an A− score.

Robert Canning of IGN gave the episode a rating of 6.5 out of 10.

Chris O'Hara of TVFanatic.com gave the episode a rating of 4 out of 5.
