= Daniel Escobar =

American actor (1964-2013)

- Escobar on Lizzie McGuire
- Born: Daniel Rene Escobar; April 9, 1964; California, U.S.
- Died: December 13, 2013 (aged 49); Los Angeles, California, U.S.
- Occupation: Actor
- Years active: 1988–2011

Daniel Rene Escobar (April 9, 1964 – December 13, 2013) was an American actor known for playing Mr. Escobar, a teacher on the Disney Channel TV series, Lizzie McGuire. His other television credits include Charmed, Curb Your Enthusiasm, NYPD Blue, and Malcolm in the Middle, amongst others. He died in a Los Angeles hospital on December 13, 2013, from complications resulting from diabetes; he was 49 years old.

== Early life and career ==
He was born in McAllen, Texas. His last role was a waiter in Whitney back in 2011.

== Filmography ==
Year	Title	Role	Notes
1988	Talk Radio	Frank	Film, Voice
1997	The Beautician and the Beast	Hector	Film
1997	Leather Jacket Love Story	Zana	Film
1998-2002	NYPD Blue	Tim Jones / Falana	2 episodes
1999-2002	Dharma & Greg	Lorenzo	4 episodes
2000	Malcolm in the Middle	Franklin	Episode: "Red Dress"
2000	Between Christmas and New Year's	Manager	Film
2001	The Mexican	Raoul	Film
2001	Blow	Emilio Ochoa	Film
2001	Fishes	Deck Dexter	Film
2001-2002	Lizzie McGuire	Mr. Escobar	5 episodes
2002	The Country Bears	Store Manager	Film
2002	Curb Your Enthusiasm	Chef Josh	Episode: "Club Soda and Salt"
2003	The Lizzie McGuire Movie	Mr. Escobar	Film
2003	Charmed	Richard Jean	Episode: "Sense and Sense Ability"
2003	Two and a Half Men	Richard	Episode: "Alan Harper, Frontier Chiropractor"
2008	The Human Contract	Seth	Film
2009	Not Forgotten	Hector	Film
2009	Desperate Housewives	Photographer	Episode: "Bargaining"
2009	Weeds	Receptionist	Episode: "Glue"
2010	Sympathy for Delicious	Hector	Film
2011	How I Met Your Mother	Professor Rodriguez	Episode: "The Exploding Meatball Sub"
2011	Whitney	Waiter	Episode: "First Date", (final appearance)
