= Challenge Accepted =

- How I Met Your Mother episode
- Episode no.: Season 6 Episode 24
- Directed by: Pamela Fryman
- Written by: Carter Bays; Craig Thomas
- Production code: 6ALH23
- Original air date: May 16, 2011

Guest appearances
- Nazanin Boniadi as Nora; Marshall Manesh as Ranjit; Jennifer Morrison as Zoey Pierson; Dave Foley as Jake Bloom; Chi McBride as Rod

Episode chronology
← Previous "Landmarks"	Next → "The Best Man"
- How I Met Your Mother season 6

"Challenge Accepted" is the 24th and final episode of the sixth season of the CBS sitcom How I Met Your Mother and the 136th episode overall. It aired on May 16, 2011.

== Plot ==
With the Arcadian, Barney and Ted argue who is going to press the button to blow up the building. Ted mentions that he ran into his ex-girlfriend Zoey after breaking up and she asked to get coffee, which Robin and Barney say is a signal that she wants to get back together.

The episode flashes-forward to September 2011. Marshall is feeling down, so Lily decides to get them both some of their favorite soup from a filthy rundown restaurant, but Lily gets ill and begins throwing up presumably from terrible food poisoning. Desperate to stop Marshall from eating any, she runs from the school to their house, where she stops him before he takes a spoonful of his third bowl. Marshall has a business meeting with a prospective employer and has figured out the time when he will begin vomiting. After disgusting images and stories, Marshall runs out of the room to vomit. He comes home and lies down to get some rest before his "countdown" finishes. He wakes up the following morning to find out that he was not ill and Lily is pregnant.

Ted is distraught about the lighting for the new building and decides that this warrants getting back together with Zoey. He decides to meet her and buys an orchid like he first did, but Barney and Robin stop him. While on their way to stop Ted, they have a tender moment, but decide they need to move on. Barney lets Ted press the button to blow up the Arcadian, and Barney meets Nora again, and asks her to coffee, which Nora accepts. Robin becomes upset as she sees that Barney wants to get back together with Nora. The episode flashes-forward to the wedding first seen in "Big Days", where Ted and Marshall are sitting outside the church, and Ted is then called in by Lily. Ted goes inside to check on the groom, who is Barney.

== Production ==
It was such an honor to be able to use music from a Beatle (and one of my favorite albums of all time – All Things Must Pass is definitely on my 'desert island' albums list). We bookended the season with this song ["Ballad of Sir Frankie Crisp (Let It Roll)" by George Harrison], which was the first time it was hinted at that the place where Ted ultimately meets 'The Mother' was at a wedding. It certainly wasn't easy to secure the rights to the song, but it was well worth it.

— Andy Gowan, How I Met Your Mother music supervisor talking about "Ballad of Sir Frankie Crisp"

According to show co-creators Carter Bays and Craig Thomas, a majority of this Season 6 finale takes place in September instead of May "so we can pick up Season 7 exactly where we left off". Said Thomas, "This is the first time in the history of our show we're doing a finale that is not set in May. We jump ahead to September, basically to the beginning of next season."

This episode was shot with extra security because of the two major revelations at the end: Lily being pregnant and Barney being the groom at the future wedding.

== Reception ==
Donna Bowman of The A.V. Club gave the episode a B. IGN gave the episode a rating of 7.0 out of 10.0.
