= Garbage Island (How I Met Your Mother) =

- How I Met Your Mother episode
- Episode no.: Season 6 Episode 17
- Directed by: Michael Shea
- Written by: Tom Ruprecht
- Production code: 6ALH17
- Original air date: February 21, 2011

Guest appearances
- Jennifer Morrison as Zoey Pierson; Kyle MacLachlan as George "The Captain" Van Smoot; Nazanin Boniadi as Nora; Dan O'Brien as Meeker

Episode chronology
| ← Previous "Desperation Day" | Next → "A Change of Heart" |
- How I Met Your Mother season 6

"Garbage Island" is the 17th episode of the sixth season of the CBS sitcom How I Met Your Mother and the 129th episode overall. It aired on February 21, 2011.

== Plot ==
At Hong Kong International Airport in 2021, Ted's flight to New York City has been cancelled. While arguing with an attendant at the departure lounge, he runs into Wendy the Waitress. Future Ted describes how it happened.

At MacLaren's, Ted and Zoey tell Wendy the Waitress how they ended up together. Ted says Zoey was unhappy with her marriage to the Captain, and after a serious fight that ended with the Captain wanting a divorce, Zoey and Ted decided to give a relationship a try. Zoey asks Ted to get her personal belongings from the Captain's apartment. The stuff has been left at the lobby. Just as Ted comes to get the box, the Captain encounters him and at his study, says that Zoey left him for a mustachioed man, narrating a different version of his last argument with Zoey. Ted fails to get the box. He later returns to the apartment building, where the Captain claims that the doorman seduced Zoey. He threatens to harm the doorman but Ted convinces him to let her go because they have nothing in common anyway. Before leaving the apartment with Zoey's box, he admits that he was the one for whom Zoey left the Captain. Later at MacLaren's, Zoey says that good things can come out of something bad.

Meanwhile, Barney reports to the gang that his laser tag date on Valentine's Day with Nora did not go well, despite her giving him her calling card which he later tears up. Robin catches Barney smiling whenever he mentions Nora, and gives him a napkin with Nora's phone number so he can call her. Robin eventually dares him to sleep with her to prove he does not like Nora. Barney shows up at Ted and Robin's apartment, which infuriates Robin because she had been encouraging him to pursue Nora. However, Barney reveals he had actually come to ask for Nora's phone number; pleased, Robin gives it to him and tells him to go for it.

Lily is frustrated at home because Marshall is too fixated with watching a documentary about the Great Pacific Garbage Patch to even think about sex. He creates a presentation for a new GNB environmental campaign, but it is negatively received and Arthur Hobbs fires Meeker, the only employee who liked the presentation. Lily catches Marshall in the dumpster trying to find a set of Tallboy O-rings. Marshall tells Lily that his father's death affected his career choices and fears that starting a family right away could force him to work at GNB forever. Lily asks him to save the planet first then start raising a family.

Marshall's obsession also angers Wendy the Waitress because his advocacy prompts MacLaren's to have her carry spent bottles to the recycling center every night, which results in her having back pains. Future Ted says Meeker was a MacLaren's patron who met Wendy the night he goes to the bar to confront Marshall over his dismissal. Wendy's bag of bottles breaks and Meeker helps Wendy pick them up.

The ending scene shows that because they both hated Marshall, Wendy and Meeker did end up together, being on their second honeymoon when they encountered Ted at the airport. Ted says he is already married with two kids, and his relationship with Zoey did not end well. Ted begins the story of how he met his wife starting from the wedding, but Wendy interrupts saying they have to go. Ted immediately calls Marshall about the encounter.

== Critical response ==
Robert Canning of IGN gave the episode a rating of 7 out of 10.

Donna Bowman of The A.V. Club gave the episode an A−.
