= Unfinished (How I Met Your Mother) =

- How I Met Your Mother episode
- Episode no.: Season 6 Episode 3
- Directed by: Pamela Fryman
- Written by: Jamie Rhonheimer
- Production code: 6ALH03
- Original air date: October 4, 2010

Guest appearances
- Tara Erica Moore as Rachel; Malea Mitchell as Chrissy; Jude Will as 7-year-old karate student; James Lanham as 16-year-old karate student

Episode chronology
← Previous "Cleaning House"	Next → "Subway Wars"
- How I Met Your Mother season 6

"Unfinished" is the third episode of the sixth season of the CBS sitcom How I Met Your Mother, and the 115th episode overall. It aired on October 4, 2010.

== Plot ==
Future Ted states that during his early years as a professor, he had a simple goal: to give a lecture that would change someone's life. While giving a lecture on Antoni Gaudí's unfinished magnum opus, the Sagrada Família, Ted takes an airplane out of his pocket. The story flashes back a couple days earlier, when Barney surprises Ted one day by telling him that Goliath National Bank is reconsidering Ted's design of the new GNB building that had been scrapped before. Ted is intrigued but decides he does not want to work for GNB, with him and Marshall likening them to the Galactic Empire. Barney seems to accept this, but later is seen to be ignoring Ted. Ted realizes Barney is playing him like he would a hot girl, as Barney really does want Ted to design the building. Barney's attempts to "woo" Ted seem to be working, as Ted finds himself wanting to accept the job more and more.

Finally, Barney tells Ted they have already accepted another offer, with Marshall backing up his claim. Ted goes to Barney and offers to do the job at half price, but Marshall reveals they had not accepted another offer, only pretending to do so to convince Ted even more. Shocked that Barney and Marshall had lied to him, Ted declines the offer again. The story returns to the lecture, where Ted changes his mind and rushes to Barney to accept the job; he however, forces Barney to take him out to dinner first, as Barney had stated he never took a woman out before "closing the deal" first.

Meanwhile, Robin reveals she may not have gotten over her relationship with Don as easily as everyone thought; having accidentally seen him on TV for a news show in Chicago, she ends up drunk dialing him and leaving angry messages. Lily tries to get her to delete Don's number, though at first she lies about it and leaves another message while drunk. Robin confronts Lily about some of her unfinished passions and asks her to delete the number of a karate dojo. Lily had accidentally walked into a group of kids training, and to her embarrassment, she had been trounced by one of the kids. Marshall also deletes the number of a booker for the club where his band played once, and Marshall is forced to agree they would probably never get back together.

When they delete the numbers, Robin also deletes Don's number, but ends up calling him anyway, this time sober and leaving another message as she had memorized his number. Robin admits that the reason why she is having such a hard time getting over Don is because their relationship ended so quickly, it feels unfinished. Some time later, Robin attempts to leave him another message, but finds she has forgotten his number. Smiling, she realizes she finally got some of the closure she wanted.

In the end, Lily and Marshall show they are still attached to their respective passions; Lily practices a kick, while Marshall sings like he did in his gig. In the tag scene, Lily returns to the karate dojo to confront the kid; now older and seemingly still in the same class, the boy replies, "I knew this day would come" and he and Lily rush towards each other to fight.

== Production ==
In a July 2010 interview, show co-creator Craig Thomas said the GNB tower project is a result of the bank getting bailout money under the American Recovery and Reinvestment Act of 2009.

== Critical response ==
Donna Bowman of The A.V. Club gave the episode a B+ rating.

Robert Canning of IGN gave the episode a rating of 9 out of 10.

DeAnn Welker of Television Without Pity gave the episode a B+ score.

Chris O'Hara of TVFanatic.com gave the episode a rating of 3.5 out of 5.
