= Canning Randy =

- How I Met Your Mother episode
- Episode no.: Season 6 Episode 7
- Directed by: Pamela Fryman
- Written by: Chuck Tatham
- Production code: 6ALH06
- Original air date: November 1, 2010

Guest appearances
- Jennifer Morrison as Zoey Pierson; Will Forte as Randy Wharmpess; Bob Odenkirk as Arthur Hobbs; Laura Bell Bundy as Becky

Episode chronology
← Previous "Baby Talk"	Next → "Natural History"
- How I Met Your Mother season 6

"Canning Randy" is the seventh episode of the sixth season of the CBS sitcom How I Met Your Mother, and the 119th episode overall. It aired on November 1, 2010.

== Plot ==
Ted is overjoyed that his class adores him, but it is because he gives out Halloween candy. Zoey Pierson sits in at Ted's class and turns his students against him. She reveals Ted's planning to demolish the Arcadian to design a new building, and the class skips to attend a protest. Ted takes Lily's advice to not appear so gentle, and threatens to have the entire class fail if they keep skipping.

Marshall is bothered by inept fellow employee Randy at work; Barney urges Marshall to fire Randy, but Marshall does not wish to be so cruel like GNB is thought to be. Randy annoys Marshall so much that he fires him. Marshall feels guilty and convinces his boss Arthur Hobbs to have Randy rehired and urges him to be more benevolent. Randy is thrilled he was fired, as he plans to use his severance to start a beer brewery. Randy does not take Marshall's "good" news about being rehired well, and promptly begins intentionally destroying Marshall's office to get himself fired, as quitting his job would not net him the severance. Marshall resists the urge to fire him despite the mess Randy is creating; with Marshall's office in disarray, Randy apologizes. He offers Marshall a bottle of his homemade beer; noting how good it tastes, Marshall fires Randy. Future Ted states Randy starts a brewing company, brewing a beer called Wharmpess, which becomes a success.

Robin continues to be annoyed by her new co-anchor, Becky. She is even more bothered when Becky appears in a commercial, which Robin thinks is unprofessional for a journalist. The morning after Halloween, the gang catches Robin coming back from last night's parties, assuming she had a one-night stand. Lily believes she had slept with Randy, due to Randy appearing to have a slight interest in her. Robin claims this to be the truth, though eventually she reveals she had given in and starred in a commercial to appear popular; the commercial is for adult diapers, much to everyone's amusement. Robin says the commercial may not even air, though Future Ted states it ran for seven years.

== Public reviews ==
Reviews for this episode were mixed. Hitfix's Alan Sepinwall said: "Canning Randy was one of the weakest episodes we've had in season six." DeAnn Welker of Television Without Pity graded the episode at D, stating that it was no different from the "very choppy days of last season," citing a lack of direction about GNB's ad campaign and how things don't work when supporting characters hog the airtime at the expense of main characters such as Barney. Michaelangelo Matos of The A.V. Club gave the episode a B rating. Robert Canning of IGN gave the episode a rating of 6.5 out of 10. Chris O'Hara of TVFanatic.com gave the episode a rating of 3 out of 5.
