= Ryan Ozawa =

Hawaiian writer

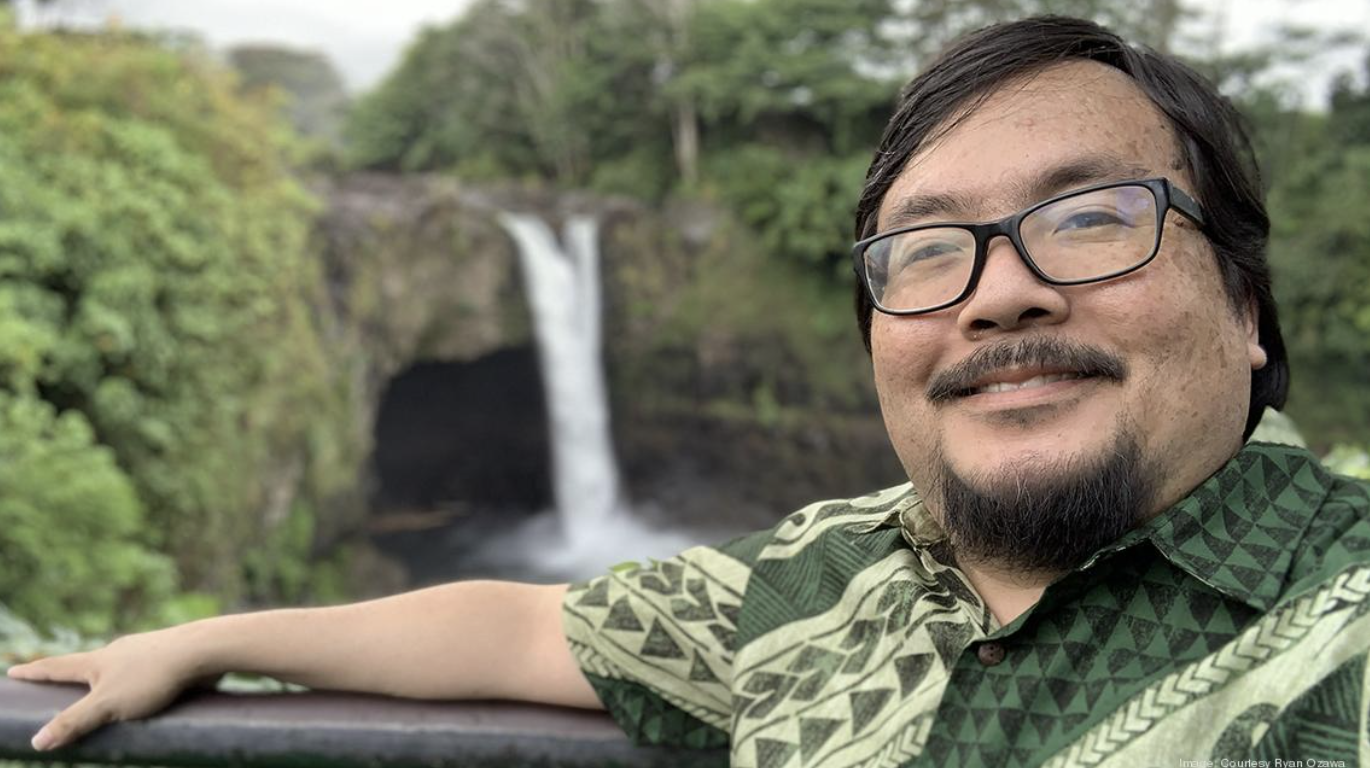
Ozawa at Rainbow Falls in Hilo, Hawai'i.

Ryan Ozawa is a Hawaiian writer, journalist, and tech entrepreneur. He is noted for having published an online diary and a podcast before such media had become popular.

== Journalism ==
Ryan has contributed as a technology correspondent for every major media outlet in Hawaii. He is a technology columnist for the Honolulu Star-Advertiser and a former technology talk show host at Hawaii Public Radio. He appears regularly on Hawaii News Now, Civil Beat, KHON and KITV where he has advised on topics ranging from the Hawaiian Labor Department's computer system, which he identified as outdated, as well as the potential of telecommuting for Hawaii workers.

He was among 25 independent journalists nationwide selected to participate in Facebook’s Bulletin platform launch in 2021. Ryan Ozawa served as the Editor-in-Chief of the daily student newspaper at the University of Hawaii at Manoa, Ka Leo, and the weekly student newspaper at the University of Hawaii at Hilo.

He founded the website Diarist.net. in 1994 and is an early example of an online diarist. Ozawa also established the website Hawaii Stories, which focuses specifically on writing about the community.

In 2004, Ozawa participated in the Honolulu Community-Media Council luncheon, where he participated in the discussion surrounding "Technology and Digital Journalism." As part of this luncheon, Ozawa argued that the Internet's potential had not yet been tapped by that point.

== Startups ==
Ozawa has been involved in a number of startups including Smart Yields, an ag-tech startup founded in 2015. Ozawa was named CEO in 2022. He also co-founded an organization called Kahanu, which brings together "entrepreneurs, engineers, designers and developers" to design and build open-source ventilators during the ventilator shortage in the COVID-19 pandemic.

== COVID-19 ==
In April 2020, Ozawa developed a map that combines Hawaii's rate of COVID-19 infection by ZIP Code in Hawaii with Google Maps. He did this to address flaws in the official data from the State of Hawai'i. He used reports from 250 locations as of August 26, 2020 from businesses of COVID-19 cases. Ozawa noted that such information should have been compiled by the Department of Health. He was also highly critical of the fact that the DOH frequently changed the parameters of the data. His data was utilized by researchers to help with both studying and developing a response plan for the virus. These include a mathematical model for the University of Hawaii and by the National Disaster Preparedness Training Center. Another COVID-19 project Ozawa worked on was a registry to help Hawaii residents find where they can buy face masks. Ozawa and his daughter were also among the first to participate in Pfizer's COVID-19 vaccine trials in Hawaii.

== Awards ==
In 1999, Ozawa received the "Carol Burnett Fund for Responsible Journalism" award. In 2017, HVCA awarded him the "Startup Champion of the Year" award. In 2013 he was named a "SBH Business Booster" by the Small Business Hawaii Entrepreneurial Education Foundation, due to his involvement in his community, as well as trying to speak up for businesses and entrepreneurs. In 2017, HVCA awarded him the "Startup Champion of the Year" award.

== Culture ==
Ozawa and his wife produced a podcast about the television show Lost, and will be featured in a 2024 documentary about the show.

When a federal judge in Hawaii placed a temporary block on President Donald Trump's travel ban, supporters of the ban spread the Twitter hashtag campaign #BoycottHawaii. Ozawa, whose Twitter account has the handle @Hawaii, was the subject of a significant amount of invective from these protesters, due to the impression that the Twitter account was associated with the State government.

== Personal ==
In addition to his online projects, he has also worked as the communications director for Hawaii Information Service. and as the information security officer Internet banking manager for Hawaii National Bank. He received a degree in journalism from the University of Hawaii. He has three children, and lost his wife Jennifer to cancer in 2021.
