= The Exploding Meatball Sub =

- How I Met Your Mother episode
- Episode no.: Season 6 Episode 20
- Directed by: Pamela Fryman
- Written by: Stephen Lloyd
- Production code: 6ALH20
- Original air date: April 11, 2011

Guest appearances
- Jennifer Morrison as Zoey Pierson; Robbie Amell as Nate "Scooby" Scooberman; Tamara Camille as Woman in Barney's Bed; Daniel Escobar as Professor Rodriguez; Edward Flores as Marc; Bruce Gray as Senior Partner; Elizabeth Nicole as Random Girl

Episode chronology
← Previous "Legendaddy"	Next → "Hopeless"
- How I Met Your Mother season 6

"The Exploding Meatball Sub" is the 20th episode of the sixth season of the CBS sitcom How I Met Your Mother and the 132nd episode overall. It aired on April 11, 2011.

== Plot ==
Ted and the others realize how much he and Zoey argue, a polar opposite of Lily and Marshall’s relationship, where the two always seem to be in support of each other. Ted and Lily argue throughout the episode about whose relationship is better. However, Ted begins to feel Lily is right and is growing tired of his constant feuding with Zoey; he is also especially annoyed that Zoey had requested the Arcadian be listed as a landmark, which could scrap his entire project if accepted. When Ted argues again with Zoey about his dream to build a skyscraper in New York, he begins thinking he needs to break up with her. However, Ted realizes he has grown fond of their arguing ("graduation goggles"), and instead kisses her. Future Ted muses on which type of relationship is better, but promptly decides a supportive one is best, a fact his younger self would have to learn the hard way.

Marshall has been growing increasingly displeased with his job at GNB, and is considering quitting to get a job with the Natural Resources Defense Council. Lily assures him that he has her full support no matter what, despite Barney pointing out Marshall's new job would pay considerably less. Lily's resolve is tested, however, when Marshall quits GNB and begins work at the NRDC, but only in a volunteer capacity. Marshall later offers his home to host an NRDC fundraiser, and Lily takes Ted to pick up a guest from the airport. When they arrive, however, Lily reveals she is fed up with Marshall's plans, and worried that their future may be in jeopardy due to the lack of income. She promptly leaves to head to Spain, a trip she had been hoping to take with Marshall, but one that now seems impossible. Later, at the fundraiser, Ted attempts to tell Marshall about Lily, but she makes a surprise return and assures Marshall again that he has her support. When Ted glances skeptically at her, Lily breaks down and reveals her doubts, but Marshall thanks Lily for her support and states that he will begin looking for another job with pay.

Upon hearing Marshall's decision to quit GNB, Barney is considerably shaken, prompting Robin to wonder if it is because of Barney's recent estrangement from his father. After Robin witnesses Barney tearing up his office, the two finally talk about it. Barney explains the real reason: some time ago, Marshall had pointed out some marinara sauce on Barney's suit while eating a meatball sub. Extremely irked by this comment, Barney spent months plotting his revenge, designing an exploding meatball sub to give to Marshall. Marshall had quit on the day Barney had planned to have Marshall receive the sub, denying him his chance at revenge.

In the end, ten years later, Barney is shown apparently on his death bed, with his grieving friends beside him. Barney tells Marshall to eat a meatball sub as his last request; the sub promptly explodes in Marshall's face, and Barney reveals he isn't actually sick, rejoicing at having finally taken his revenge. When Ted points out some marinara sauce on Barney's clothes, Barney begins eyeing Ted in the same vengeful way he had with Marshall.

== Reception ==
Donna Bowman of the A.V. Club gave the episode a B+ score. She said the subplots about the GNB headquarters project, Marshall and Lily's efforts to have a baby, and Marshall's dream to be an environmental lawyer, melded together after being sidelined for weeks because of the death of Marshall's father and the appearance of Barney's father.

Robert Canning of IGN rated the episode at 6.5 out of 10, saying the episode had very unsatisfying results in trying to be grounded in reality.

Angel Cohn of Television Without Pity graded the episode a C.
