= Bad News (How I Met Your Mother) =

- How I Met Your Mother episode
- Lily talks to Dr. John Stangel, who bears a resemblance to her friend Barney.
- Episode no.: Season 6 Episode 13
- Directed by: Pamela Fryman
- Written by: Jennifer Hendriks
- Production code: 6ALH13
- Original air date: January 3, 2011

Guest appearances
- Alexis Denisof as Sandy Rivers; Suzie Plakson as Judy Eriksen; Bill Fagerbakke as Marvin Eriksen Sr.

Episode chronology
← Previous "False Positive"	Next → "Last Words"
- How I Met Your Mother season 6

"Bad News" is the 13th episode of the sixth season of the American sitcom How I Met Your Mother. It originally aired on January 3, 2011, on CBS. The series focuses on main character Ted Mosby (Josh Radnor) and his group of friends in New York City. The episode's narrative mainly follows characters Marshall (Jason Segel) and Lily (Alyson Hannigan) as they question their chances of being able to conceive and find a specialist that happens to have an uncanny resemblance to their friend Barney (Neil Patrick Harris). After receiving good news about their fertilization, the episode ends with Marshall being informed by Lily that his father has had a heart attack and died. Meanwhile, Robin (Cobie Smulders) runs into someone from her past at her new job.

The death of Marshall's father came from the writers' desire to explore the characters' reactions to such a loss. The episode acquired high ratings and generally positive reception from critics, who praised its twist ending and emotion. In 2011, TV Guide listed "Bad News" in its list of the year's Top TV Episodes. It earned Jennifer Turchi, Megan Moore and Bradley M. Look nominations at the 63rd Primetime Creative Arts Emmy Awards for Outstanding Makeup for a Multi-Camera Series or Special (Non-Prosthetic).

== Plot ==
After several months of trying to conceive without success, married couple Marshall and Lily are referred to a fertility expert. As they tell their friend Ted the news at MacLaren's, their other friend Barney arrives and announces to Ted and Marshall's dismay that he needs a partner for a laser tag tournament. Lily goes to her appointment with the fertility expert, Dr. John Stangel, who looks exactly like Barney except for his beard and dark brown hair. Lily assumes he is Barney in disguise and confronts him, but Marshall says they were together the whole day. Marshall skeptically attends Lily's next appointment, but to his surprise also becomes convinced that Stangel and Barney are the same person. Barney arrives, acknowledges the similarity and leaves. After some misunderstandings, Lily finally sees Barney and Stangel in the same room together and is satisfied that they are two different people.

When Lily's tests reveal that she is extremely fertile, Marshall considers that his sperm may be the problem. He decides to get his sperm tested but is unable to produce a sperm sample at the doctor's office. He returns home to produce the sample, only to find that his parents have dropped by for a surprise visit. He reluctantly tells them his concerns about infertility, but they reassure him that they love him no matter what.

Meanwhile, Robin's new job at World Wide News has started badly. The network's lead anchor is her old colleague Sandy Rivers, who tells the entire office that they had sex and tells increasingly embarrassing stories about her to her co-workers. After an especially humiliating day, Ted helps Robin confront Sandy at his apartment. Ted learns that Sandy is bald and wears a toupee; he takes a picture and tells Robin to show their office. At work the next day, Robin pulls out her old Robin Sparkles jacket, embracing the mockery and moving on rather than humiliating Sandy.

Concurrently, after spending the entire day anticipating bad news, Marshall receives good news about his fertility from Stangel. Marshall tries to call his father, but there is no answer. Lily then pulls up in a taxi and tearfully informs Marshall that his father has died after suffering a heart attack. A shocked and grief-stricken Marshall weeps in Lily's arms and says he is not ready for "this".

== Production ==
=== Writing ===
The twist ending of Marshall's father's death was the result of show co-creators and producers Carter Bays and Craig Thomas' desire to explore the issue of the characters experiencing such a loss. Talking about the unexpected death of Marshall's father, Bays said that "these kind of moments happen when you don't expect them". The writers wanted to "shock the audience" and have them relate to the characters. Bays said that "much of what we love about the show is the relatability of it". The writers tried to "create characters and stories that people see themselves in...As we've ticked off every milepost of young adulthood, sadly this is another one of those mileposts".

Speaking of the episode's emotional ending, Bays said in an interview that it is difficult to "create a sense of foreboding on a 22-minute CBS sitcom. We wanted it to be a sucker punch, but we wanted to balance the sucker-to-punch ratio." According to Bays, "very early" into the episode's production, the writers "set the goal for [themselves] that [they] weren't going to sugarcoat it or back away from something if there's a little darkness to it. Loss is a part of life". An early draft of the episode contained a scene with an onscreen death of Marshall's father, but it was cut out of the final version. Jason Segel says the scene was left out due to fear of it possibly being leaked onto the internet.

I was surprised that people caught it, actually...I thought it would be a thing you notice three viewings in, but I guess it was a little more visible than we intended.

— Bays on the episode's countdown sequences

Throughout "Bad News", numbers appear on ordinary objects counting down from 50 to 1. This is a countdown from the beginning of the episode to the eventual bad news, which is told right after the "1" is shown. As the final scene of the episode closes, a parking meter is shown displaying an "expired" state. The countdown was an idea taken from the 1988 film Drowning by Numbers; through the course of that film, the numbers 1 to 100 appear in order, sometimes seen in the background, and other times spoken by the film's characters. According to Bays, the countdown was used to give an early signal to the audience that something big was going to happen at the end of the episode.

=== Filming ===
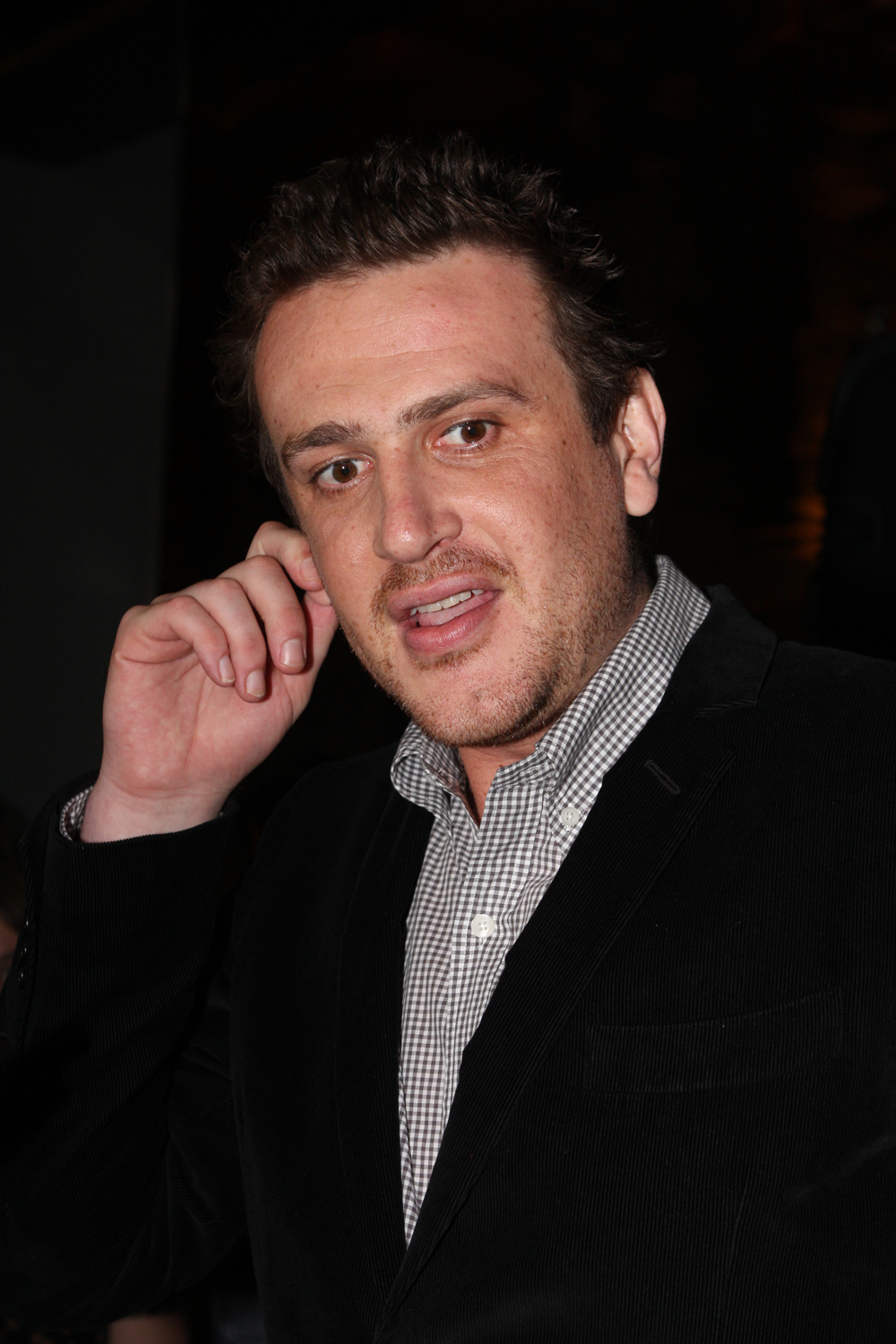
Jason Segel says he was not told about the episode's ending.

Jason Segel and Alyson Hannigan, who portray Marshall and Lily, respectively, were not told about the final scene. Segel said the original script had Lily saying she was pregnant, but on the scene's actual shooting day, the producers revealed that the scene would turn out differently. The script simply stated "Lily tells Marshall some news", in order to protect the script from leaking and spoiling the ending. Segel and Hannigan worked out a plan wherein Segel's cue to react would be on Hannigan finishing her line with the word "it", so Segel would not know what the bad news is until the filming of the scene itself. The scene was done in only one take.

== Release ==
"Bad News" first aired on January 3, 2011, on CBS. The episode was viewed by an audience of 10.15 million live viewers, a high for the sixth season. The episode's numbers was surpassed by the following episode, "Last Words", by around 360 thousand.

=== Critical reception ===
"Bad News" was positively received by critics, who praised the episode's emotion and acting. Robert Canning of IGN gave the episode a rating of 9.5 out of 10. He praised the episode, calling it a "[classic] that will surely rank high with some of the show's best". The review also was positive towards Robin's side-plot, writing that it "worked" because of the "flashbacks and videos of Robin's many faux past". In its annual list of the year's best episodes, TV Guide placed "Bad News" in its 2011 list, describing Segel's "quick switch from jubilation to inconsolable heartbreak" as "Emmy-worthy".

Conversely, Donna Bowman of The A.V. Club gave the episode a C rating, opining that the ending was "well handled". Bowman also called the episode's treatment of Marshall "cruel". DeAnn Welker of Television Without Pity graded the episode an A. In a ranking by the staff of Entertainment Weekly highlighting the series' 50 best episodes placed "Bad News" in the #6 spot. The review, which put the episode together with "Last Words", reacted positively to its emotion, saying the episode left the audience "stunned" and crying.

"Bad News" was honored at the 63rd Primetime Creative Arts Emmy Awards. Makeup artists Jennifer Turchi, Megan Moore and Bradley M. Look received nominations for Outstanding Makeup for a Multi-Camera Series or Special (Non-Prosthetic), ultimately losing to an episode of Saturday Night Live.
