= Desperation Day =

- How I Met Your Mother episode
- Episode no.: Season 6 Episode 16
- Directed by: Pamela Fryman
- Written by: Tami Sagher
- Production code: 6ALH16
- Original air date: February 14, 2011

Guest appearances
- Jennifer Morrison as Zoey Pierson; Suzie Plakson as Judy Eriksen; Bill Fagerbakke as Marvin Eriksen Sr.; Nazanin Boniadi as Nora

Episode chronology
← Previous "Oh Honey"	Next → "Garbage Island"
- How I Met Your Mother season 6

"Desperation Day" is the 16th episode of the sixth season of the CBS sitcom How I Met Your Mother and the 128th episode overall. It aired on February 14, 2011. As the story approaches Desperation Day (the eve of Valentine's Day), new tensions and bonds form between the characters.

== Plot ==
Lily mentions how lonely she is with Marshall still living with his mother Judy in Minnesota, especially as Valentine's Day is nearing; the couple has an odd tradition of watching Predator every year on Valentine's after Marshall's brothers accidentally taped over a romantic film they rented in college. After admitting having used a stuffed pillow as a stand-in to Marshall (which she has nicknamed Marshpillow), Lily finally heads to Marshall's home to convince him to return. Marshall, who has essentially reverted to his teenage self, playing his old video games and not even realizing how much Lily misses him, does not wish to leave so soon, but it becomes clear Judy has become annoyed with his presence, though not admitting it to Marshall.

After confessing their feelings for each other, Ted and Zoey are happily dating though they agree to take things slow. Zoey invites Ted to help bake cookies one night; when Ted describes this is as odd to the rest of the gang, they tell him "baking cookies" is essentially code for staying over for the night. Ted arrives at Zoey's apartment with an overnight bag, but she sends him home, saying he was being presumptuous. The day before Valentine's Day, Zoey apologizes and tells Ted she is ready to get serious. However, Ted feels there is added pressure, as Zoey has just separated from her husband, and begins feeling anxious. He soon joins Marshall, claiming to help Marshall deal with his loss though in reality trying to avoid the pressure of committing to a relationship with Zoey.

Lily finally announces that she is heading back home to New York, leaving Marshall saddened. Marshall reveals to Ted the real reason he has stayed in Minnesota is because he feels lost without his dad and does not wish to return to his life. The two agree to drive back home that night, as flights have been cancelled due to a storm. During the drive, Marshall has trouble seeing the road ahead when the image of his late father appears in his back seat, giving him advice on how he drove in such conditions. Encouraged by his father's words, Marshall makes it back to New York. Lily is later thrilled when Marshall comes home, and the two watch Predator together. Meanwhile, Zoey greets Ted at his apartment and shows him her own overnight bag. Ted jokingly calls her presumptuous, and the two kiss, thus ending their anxieties about commitment.

Barney claims that single women will find themselves desperate and easy to hook up with on Desperation Day, the eve of Valentine's Day. Robin decides to prove him wrong and hangs out with her female colleagues that night. Barney hits on women until he takes interest in one of Robin's colleagues, Nora, who had just arrived. Nora privately tells Barney that unlike Robin and her other colleagues, she actually loves Valentine's Day. Barney hints that the fact she tries to appear romantic comes across as desperate, and instead begins explaining how to play laser tag. The two return to Robin to find her friends have left, as they had gone home with two other guys. Nora soon leaves as well, to Barney's disappointment, and Robin points out it is after midnight, and Barney had failed to hook up with a woman on Desperation Day. She also claims Barney is beginning to like Nora; though he denies it, Robin later invites Nora to play laser tag with Barney. Future Ted states it was the first time Barney had been on a date on Valentine's Day.

== Critical response ==
Robert Canning of IGN gave the episode a rating of 7 out of 10.

Donna Bowman of The A.V. Club gave the episode a grade of A−.
