= Jorge Garcia =

American actor and comedian (born 1973)

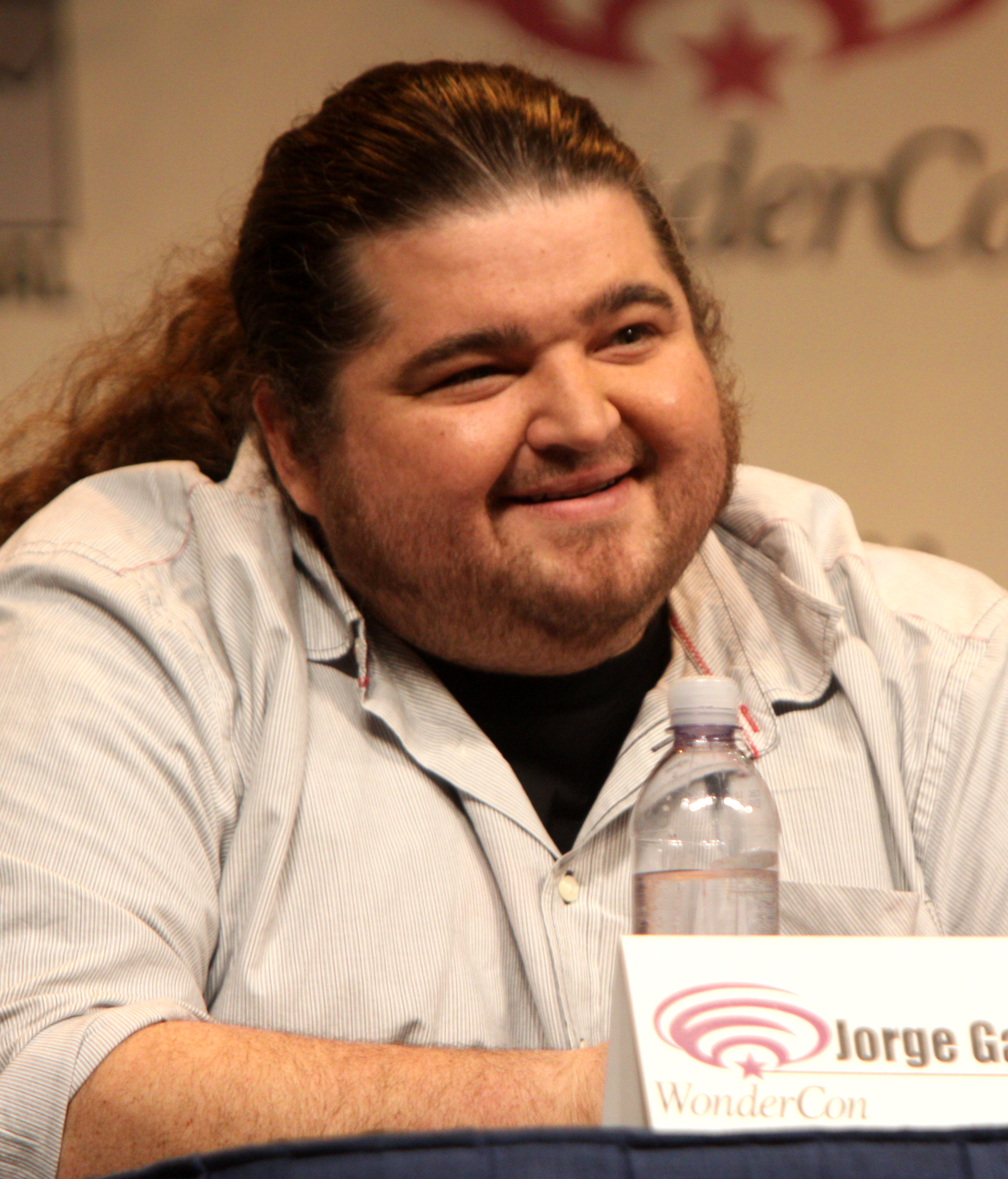
- Garcia at the March 2012 WonderCon
- Born: April 28, 1973 (age 53); Omaha, Nebraska, U.S.
- Education: University of California, Los Angeles
- Occupations: Actor, voice actor, comedian
- Years active: 1997–present
- Spouse: Rebecca Birdsall (m. 2019)
- Website: kaijupod.wordpress.com

Jorge Garcia (born April 28, 1973) is an American actor and comedian. He first came to public attention with his performance as Hector Lopez on the television show Becker, but subsequently became best known for his portrayal of Hugo "Hurley" Reyes in the television series Lost from 2004 to 2010. He starred in the Fox television series Alcatraz and played a minor character on ABC's Once Upon a Time. He starred as Jerry Ortega on Hawaii Five-0 and can be seen in the Netflix film The Ridiculous 6. Recently, he starred in the comedy series Bookie (2023-2025). Garcia also appeared on the cover of Weezer's 2010 album Hurley in a close-up shot from a photo he took with vocalist Rivers Cuomo.

== Early life and education ==
Garcia was born in Omaha, Nebraska. His mother, Dora Mesa, is a Cuban-born professor, and his father, Humberto Garcia, is a Chilean-born doctor. He grew up in San Juan Capistrano in Orange County, California and went to San Clemente High School. He wrestled in high school, where he was given the nickname "Baby-Faced Killer". As a senior, he was selected by the faculty as "Triton of the Year", the highest award given to a graduating senior.

Garcia graduated from the University of California Los Angeles (UCLA) in 1995 as a communication studies major. He also studied acting at the Beverly Hills Playhouse acting school.

== Career ==
Garcia spent six years working at Borders while auditioning. He was in a few commercials during that time. He later said that his first taste of street recognition came from starring in a Jack in the Box commercial which was aired frequently on local television.

Garcia was the first actor to be cast on Lost after the producers saw him on Curb Your Enthusiasm the night before casting began, and created the character of Hugo Reyes specifically for him. Garcia appeared in the second episode of the eighth season of Celebrity Poker Showdown, where he lost to Michael Ian Black. He was a contestant on an episode of Russian Roulette on Game Show Network. He missed a question about the Boxer Rebellion of 1900 and fell through the trap door.

Garcia is an associate producer and star in the independent film When We Were Pirates, in which he plays Jerry, who along with a group of close friends, learns that his childhood love of playing pirates helps him overcome some of the difficulties he faces later in life. He is seen singing in the studio for the upcoming project on an officially released YouTube clip.

During Lost's run, Garcia wrote a blog about the show called Dispatches from the Island. He also hosted a weekly podcast, Geronimo Jack's Beard, in which he discussed the script of Season 6.

Garcia is also featured on the front cover of Weezer's album Hurley, released on September 10, 2010. The album is named after his character from Lost. He performed as a guest vocalist at several Weezer concerts in 2010.

On November 21, 2010, Entertainment Weekly announced that Garcia was cast in the upcoming U.S. television series Alcatraz. On November 22, 2010, Garcia made a guest appearance on How I Met Your Mother's episode "Blitzgiving". In the episode, references are made to Garcia's time on Lost.

In 2011, Garcia appeared as a recurring character in Mr. Sunshine, portraying a caretaker at the Sunshine Center. Starting in January 2012, Garcia portrayed Dr. Diego Soto, an Alcatraz expert, in the Fox series Alcatraz. The show was a mid-season replacement for Fox's Terra Nova. The series was officially canceled by Fox on May 9, 2012, due to dropping viewership throughout its run. Garcia appeared on The Nerdist podcast posted June 18, 2012.

After appearing as a guest star in several season 4 episodes of Hawaii Five-0, Garcia, who plays the character of Jerry Ortega, was promoted to a series regular starting with season five.

In 2015, he joined the cast of The Healer starring with British actors Oliver Jackson-Cohen, Camilla Luddington, and Jonathan Pryce.

Garcia launched a biweekly podcast with co-host Ralph Apel dedicated to kaiju films titled Kaiju Podcast on November 14, 2016.

In 2022, Garcia competed in season seven of The Masked Singer as "Cyclops" of Team Bad. He was eliminated alongside Jordan Mailata as "Thingamabob" of Team Cuddly.

== Filmography ==
Film
Year	Title	Role	Notes
1997	Raven's Ridge	Monty	
1999	Tomorrow by Midnight	Jay	
2000	King of the Open Mics	Meatloag	
2002	The Slow and the Cautious	Teddy	Short film
2003	Tales from the Crapper	Racoon Head	Direct-to-video
2004	Our Time Is Up	Gardener	Short film
2005	The Good Humor Man	Mt. Rushmore	
2005	Little Athens	Pedro	
2006	Deck the Halls	Wallace	
2007	Sweetzer	Sergio	
2011	Maktub	Carlos	
2014	Cooties	Rick	
2015	The Wedding Ringer	Lurch / Garvey	
2015	The Ridiculous 6	Herm	
2016	Get a Job	Fernando	
2016	Rock Dog	Germur (voice)	
2017	The Healer	Father Malloy	
2020	The Wrong Missy	Guy on Plane	
2020	Nobody Knows I'm Here	Memo	
2021	All the World Is Sleeping	Nick	
2022	The Munsters	Floop	
2023	Condor's Nest	Proprietor Hipolito	
2024	Getting Lost	Himself	
2026	History's Mystery Files	Himself	

Television
Year	Title	Role	Notes
2000	The Wild Thornberrys	Ricardo	Voice, episode: "Spirited Away"
2001	Spin City	Taxi Driver	Episode: "The Arrival"
2003	Old School	Jorge	Television film
2003	Columbo	Julius	Episode: "Columbo Likes the Nightlife"
2003	Rock Me Baby	Vizzy	Episode: "Would I Lie to You?"
2003–2004	Becker	Hector Lopez	13 episodes
2004	Curb Your Enthusiasm	Drug Dealer	Episode: "The Car Pool Lane"
2004–2010	Lost	Hugo "Hurley" Reyes	108 episodes ALMA Award for Outstanding Supporting Actor in a Television Series (2006); ALMA Award for Outstanding Supporting Actor in a Drama Television Series (2008); Screen Actors Guild Award for Outstanding Performance by an Ensemble in a Drama Series (2006) (shared with cast); Nominated—ALMA Award for Outstanding Supporting Actor - Television Series, Mini-Series or Television Movie (2007); Nominated—Imagen Award for Best Supporting Actor - Television (2007–2008); Nominated—Imagen Award for Best Actor - Television; Nominated—Scream Award for Best Ensemble (2009); Nominated—Teen Choice Award for Choice TV Sidekick (2005–2007); Nominated—Teen Choice Award for Choice TV Breakout Performance - Male (2005)
2005	Higglytown Heroes	Dog Trainer Hero	Voice, episode: "Me and My Shadow"
2010, 2014	How I Met Your Mother	Steve (The Blitz)	2 episodes: "Blitzgiving" and "Gary Blauman"
2011	Mr. Sunshine	Bob Bobinson Bobert	3 episodes: "Pilot", "Hostile Workplace", and "The Assistant"
2011	Fringe	Kevin	Episode: "Os"
2012	Alcatraz	Dr. Diego Soto	13 episodes
2012	Phineas and Ferb	Rodrigo	Voice, episode: "Minor Monogram"
2012–2013	Once Upon a Time	Anton, the Giant	3 episodes: "Tallahassee", "Tiny", and "Lacey"
2013	The Ordained	Carlos	Television film
2013	Californication	Drug Dealer	2 episodes: "Rock and a Hard Place" and "Mad Dogs and Englishmen"
2013	Maggie	Gaspar	2 episodes: "Gaspar, the Friendly A.D.S.A." and "Gaspar, the Ambiguous"
2013	iSteve	Steve Wozniak	Internet film
2013–2020	Hawaii Five-0	Jerry Ortega	Recurring (season 4); main cast (seasons 5–10)
2014	Food Truck	Kyle	Television film
2016	BoJack Horseman	Himself	Voice, episode: "The BoJack Horseman Show"
2017	Tim and Eric's Bedtime Stories	Bryan	Episode: "The Duke"
2020	MacGyver	Jerry Ortega	Episode: "SOS+Hazmat+Ultrasound+Frequency+Malihini"
2022	The Masked Singer	Cyclops	Contestant on season 7; Eliminated in third episode
2023	Bookie	Hector	Main cast; 8 episodes
