= Big Days =

- How I Met Your Mother episode
- Episode no.: Season 6 Episode 1
- Directed by: Pamela Fryman
- Written by: Carter Bays; Craig Thomas
- Production code: 6ALH01
- Original air date: September 20, 2010

Guest appearances
- Rachel Bilson as Cindy; Kaylee DeFer as Casey; Bill Fagerbakke as Marvin Eriksen

Episode chronology
← Previous "Doppelgangers"	Next → "Cleaning House"
- How I Met Your Mother season 6

"Big Days" is the first episode of the sixth season of the American sitcom How I Met Your Mother. It was written by series creators Carter Bays and Craig Thomas, and directed by Pamela Fryman. It originally aired on September 20, 2010, on CBS.

== Plot ==
In a church backyard, Marshall brings Ted a beer and notices he is nervous about something. Flashing back to the present day at MacLaren's, Ted is worried about a blonde girl at the bar he wants to approach, Barney "calls dibs" on her. While they argue, Robin enters the bar looking disheveled, she has sunk into a depression after being left by her boyfriend Don. After being heckled by Barney, she returns to apartment and returns with a sundress. Robin then realizes that the girl is on a date.

Ted notices the girl has been standing next to Cindy, one of his university students who he had a bad date with, after which she treated him poorly at school. Future Ted's narration reveals Cindy's roommate is the eponymous mother. Present Ted assumes that the woman at the bar is Cindy's roommate and is determined to meet her. Cindy sees Ted and takes him aside. She thanks him for helping her realize what she was "looking for" and apologizes for mistreating him after their date. She introduces Ted to the girl, named Casey, and gives her a kiss, prompting Ted to realize that the girl is not Cindy's roommate but her girlfriend. In the future, Ted tells his kids that Cindy and the girl, whose name is revealed to be Casey, got married and had a daughter together, he then reveals he met their mother at a wedding. Back at the church backyard, Ted admits to Marshall that he is nervous about his best man wedding toast.

Meanwhile, Lily has planned a romantic evening but gets angry with Marshall when she finds out that he has told his father Marvin that they are trying to have a child. Marshall argues that his father is a part of his life and deserves to know, but Lily cannot stand Marvin's constant calls and domineering personality. The two eventually reconcile, agreeing that Marshall's father is somewhat insane and very enthusiastic, just like Marshall.

== Production ==
Rachel Bilson reprises her role as Cindy from the season five episode "Girls Versus Suits". Kaylee DeFer guest stars as Casey. Both Bilson and DeFer later return in the season eight episode "Band or DJ?".

The song "Ballad of Sir Frankie Crisp (Let It Roll)" by George Harrison appears in the closing moments of the episode. Andy Gowan, music supervisor for the series, told The Hollywood Reporter that it "certainly wasn't easy to secure the rights to the song, but it was well worth it" and that it "was such an honor to be able to use music from a Beatle". The song is heard again in the closing moments of the season finale "Challenge Accepted". Gowen listed the use of the song as one of the "top musical moments" of How I Met Your Mother.

== Critical response ==
Donna Bowman of The A.V. Club gave the episode a B+ score. She said that the episode put in the show's "core competencies in a shrewdly calculated package," citing flash-forwards to the day Ted meets the Mother and how other elements could have a role in making it happen.

Robert Canning of IGN gave the episode a rating of 8.5 out of 10.

DeAnn Welker of Television Without Pity gave the episode a B+. The episode received praise from both the Los Angeles Times and Vulture.
