= P.S. I Love You (Robin Daggers song) =

2013 song by Robin Daggers

Single by Robin Daggers

from the album How I Met Your Music: Deluxe
- Released: February 4, 2013
- Genre: Comedy; grunge
- Length: 2:34
- Label: 20th Century Fox Records; Fox Music
- Songwriters: Craig Thomas; Carter Bays
- Producer: John Swihart

How I Met Your Mother singles chronology
"You Just Got Slapped" (2012)	"P.S. I Love You" (2013)	"Night Night, Little Marvin" (2013)

"P.S. I Love You" is a song written by Craig Thomas and Carter Bays for the CBS television series How I Met Your Mother. The song was performed by Canadian actress Cobie Smulders in the role of Robin Scherbatsky, who has a secret past as a teenage Canadian pop star with the stage name Robin Sparkles. It appeared in an episode of the same name which aired on February 4, 2013.

The song, inspired by Alanis Morissette's "You Oughta Know" (1995), marks the last appearance of Robin Sparkles on the show. It was released as a single on the TV-premiere date, and appeared on the soundtrack album How I Met Your Music: Deluxe (2014). Smulders' persona was renamed "Robin Daggers", and lyrically "P.S. I Love You" depicts Daggers' obsession with a former lover. Its music video featured Daggers with a new look, inspired by Courtney Love. Television and music critics praised its humor and Smulders' performance.

== Background ==
Cobie Smulders played Robin Scherbatsky, a dedicated broadcast journalist who moves from Canada to New York for a job, in the CBS TV series How I Met Your Mother. In season 2's "Slap Bet" (2006), the character was revealed to have been a Canadian teen pop star with the stage name of Robin Sparkles. Her songs "Let's Go to the Mall" (2007) and "Sandcastles in the Sand" (2008) pay homage to 1980s American pop music, and the former was inspired by Alanis Morissette's "cheesy" material before Jagged Little Pill. The songs had 4,000 and 1,000 digital downloads, respectively, in the United States by August 2008.

Before Sparkles' appearance in season 6's "Glitter", series creators and executive producers Craig Thomas and Carter Bays came up with several ideas (including a story about a rivalry between her and Morissette). The episode (which aired November 15, 2010) ended with Sparkles appearing in the Canadian children's show Space Teens with Alan Thicke and her friend, Jessica Glitter (Nicole Scherzinger), in which Sparkles and Glitter sing "The Beaver Song". Alyssa Fikse of Uproxx suggested that it referred to Morissette's appearance on the Canadian television show You Can't Do That on Television (1986).

== Development ==
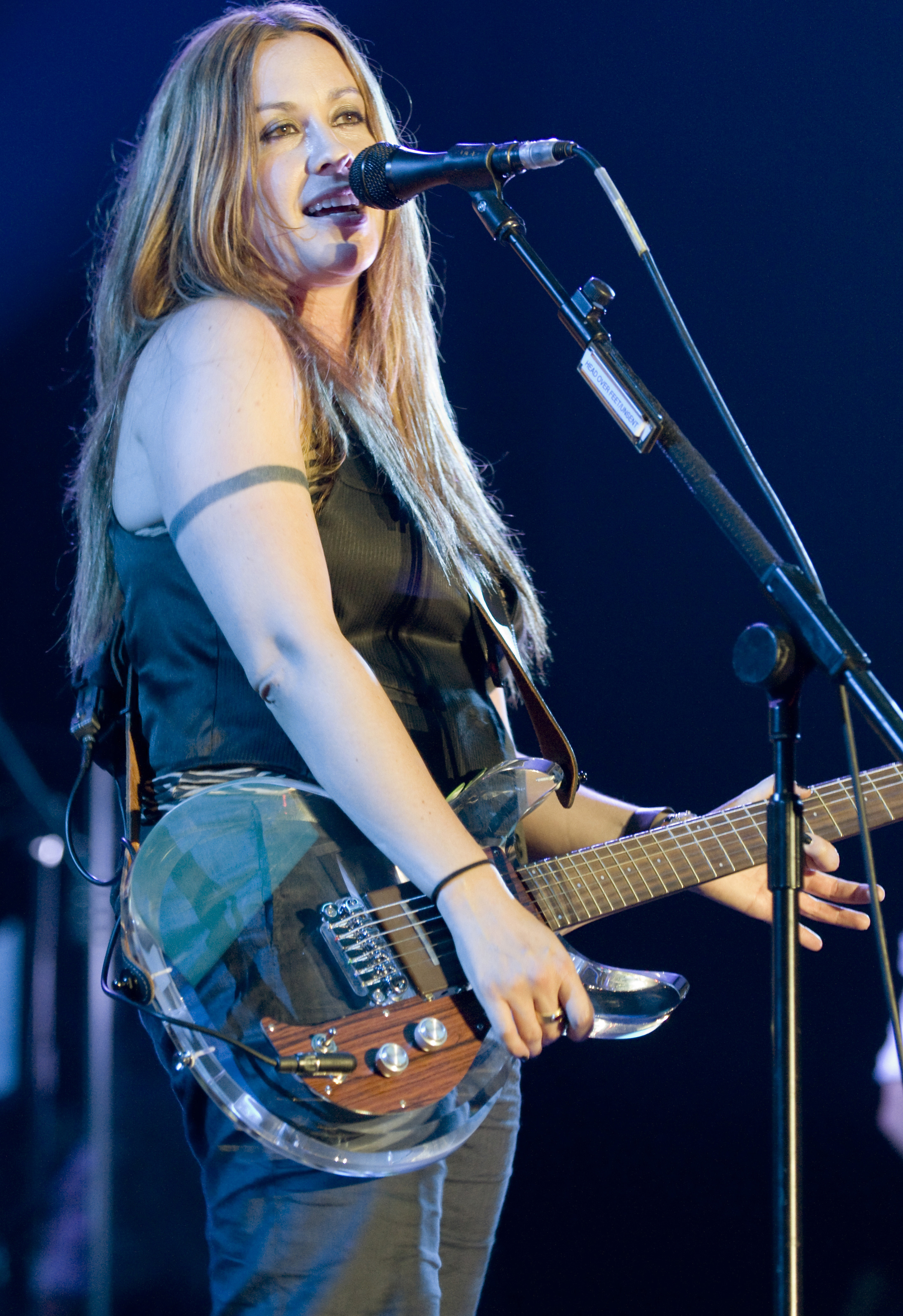
The writers were inspired by Alanis Morissette's "You Oughta Know".

Smulders tweeted a photo of herself dressed as Sparkles in October 2012 with the caption, "Guess who's back ..." Bays confirmed with TVLine two months later that there would be an episode featuring Sparkles in season 8, exposing a "darker and edgier" side of the character. Shortly after the series was announced as renewed for its ninth and final season, a number of celebrities (including James Van Der Beek, Alan Thicke, Jason Priestley, and Paul Shaffer) confirmed to be appearing in the episode on January 7. Although Brad Roberts and Morissette were contacted, they did not appear in the episode.

In an early February 2013 conference call, Thomas and Smulders spoke about the episode. Sparkles' new look and her song, "P.S. I Love You", were influenced by Morissette's "You Oughta Know" (1995). Thomas discussed lost footage from Underneath the Tunes (a parody of the documentary series Behind the Music), which showed a controversial side of Sparkles resembling "the Milli Vanilli skipping-CD-record moment". The creators wanted viewers to observe her progression over the years, with Thomas saying that this "may be the craziest Robin Sparkles yet". It was Sparkles' last appearance on the show, although Smulders and Thomas expressed interest in reprising the character in the future.

Lost footage of MuchMusic's Underneath the Tunes in the episode reveals that after "Let's Go to the Mall" and "Sandcastles in the Sand" went maple, Sparkles reached a breaking point; she changed her stage name to Robin Daggers, and recorded "P.S. I Love You" about her obsession with Paul Shaffer. Her record company, Dominant Records, refused to release it because of its dark theme. Her career ended in 1996, when she performed the song and revealed her new persona at the 84th Grey Cup halftime show (when Alex Trebek and Geddy Lee claimed that grunge began).

== Composition and recording ==
Similar to the previous songs, Smulders recorded "P.S. I Love You" with Thomas, who said that she found the new voice of Sparkles in about the third take at nine in the morning. He described the experience as "different from all of the other ones we've done ... like learning a whole other language", and considered it his favorite moment. Unlike the previous output, Smulders felt "more in tune" with the grunge-influenced song: "It's just fun to go and create something from words on a page and make a song out of it. And then choose the silly actions involved and the story lines that are happening within the song".

The 2:34 grunge song was written by Thomas and Bays. Lyrically, "P.S. I Love You" describes Daggers' obsession with a former lover. The song begins with "You, you're beautiful / On your pedestal / I see you, you don't see me". Daggers insists that she would "never move on": "Even if I get married, he'll always be second to you". The song refers to a restraining order, and contains a legal disclaimer from her record company: "The views expressed in this song do not necessarily reflect the views of Dominant Records or any of its subsidiaries". Daggers reminiscences about wearing flannel, lacing her boots, reading fanzines and watching Reality Bites while she misses her lover. Although she prays to God, "she doesn't reply". In the song, a robot says "Move on"; she replies, "I'm trying!". Daggers performs the song in an angst-ridden manner, creepily whispering "P.S. I love you" during the bridge.

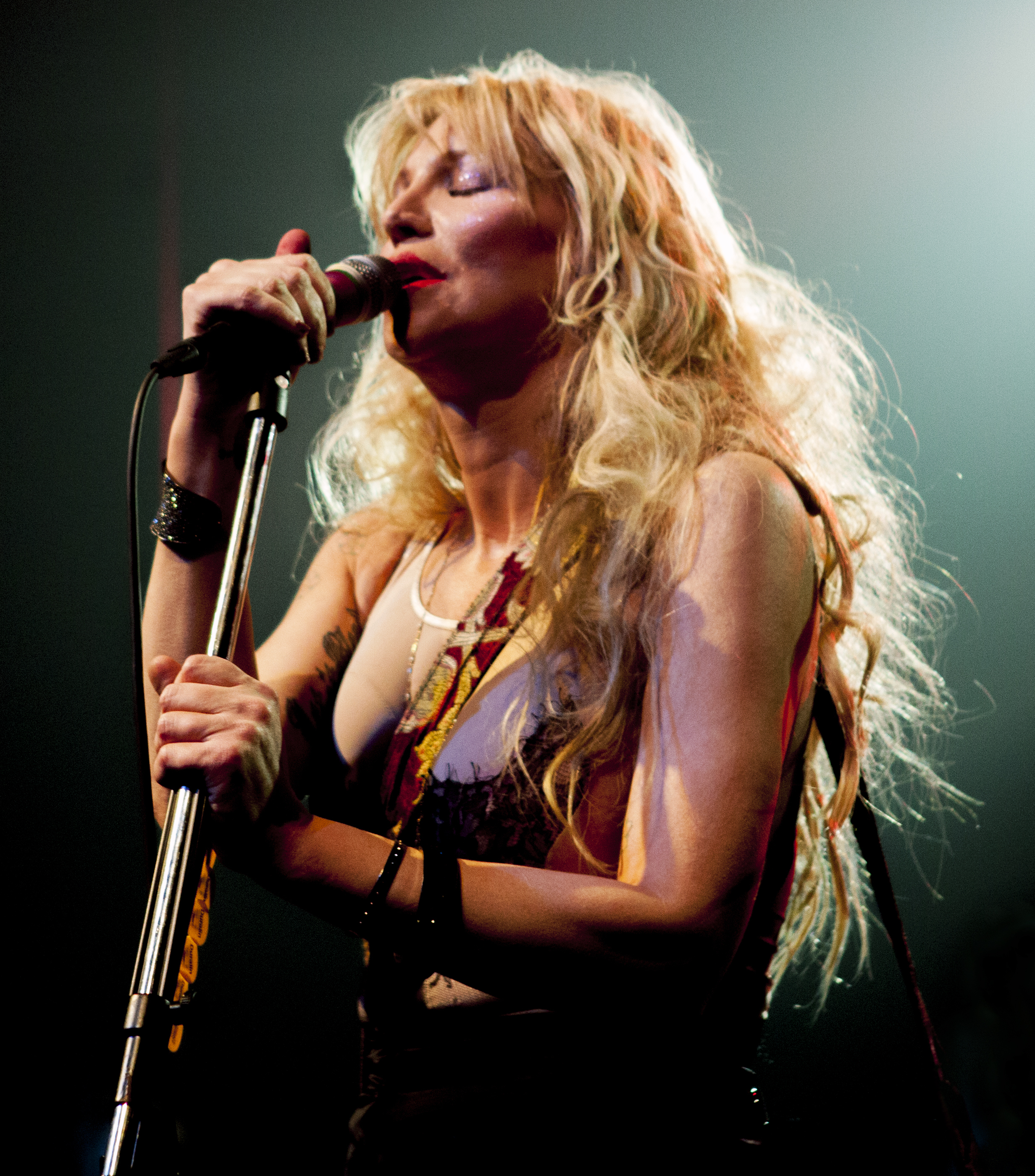
Daggers' look in the video was inspired by Courtney Love.

Smulders said that the song is a breaking point for the character: "I feel like this is sort of at the tail end of her [music] career ... She's sort of breaking away from all that and she does that by becoming this character of Robin Daggers, which has a lot of similarities to Alanis Morissette." Mark Graham of VH1 described it as a song "about being scorned", and Ethan Alter of Television Without Pity called it an "amusingly anti-love song". Kate Stanhope and Joyce Eng of TV Guide said that Daggers "lost it when she started obsessing over a mystery man" with the "Morissette-esque" song. Alyssa Fikse wrote that the track demonstrates the evolution of Daggers from a "bubbly pop star ... into [a] 90s grunge riot grrrrrl": "Any song that name-checks Reality Bites is bound to be overdramatic." Mark Perigard of the Boston Herald wrote that the song brings out Daggers' goth side, and Sarah Freymiller of Bustle described it as a "grunge-infused stalk-fest".

== Music video ==
The music video for "P.S. I Love You" was directed by Pamela Fryman. According to series costume designer Reiko Kurumada, the crew researched the "Courtney Love-ish era" to create Daggers' look. Her costume includes slip dresses with fishnets, "Kurt Cobain-ish" silk nightgowns from vintage stores, ripped-up leggings, and Dr. Martens motorcycle boots with flannel and chokers. "It was very grunge. It was a little mix of grunge with a tiny bit of femininity in it," Kurumada recalled.

According to The Hollywood Reporter, Daggers (in "grunge mode") wears dark flannel, cutoff jeans, black tights and boots, and heavy eye liner. Liat Kornowski of HuffPost wrote that she "went goth/grunge '90s. Like, Black Hole Sun '90s". Daggers is seen undressing and performing onstage (with a sign reading "Consider Questioning Authority, Please" in the background) before a crowd full of slamdancing Mounties, with interspersed shots of a shirtless old man and random words written in chalk. Fikse and Graham noted many influences of "angsty 90s music videos", including Fiona Apple's "Criminal" (1997), Nirvana's "Smells Like Teen Spirit" (1991), Metallica's "Enter Sandman" (1991), Pearl Jam's "Jeremy" (1992) and Morissette's "You Oughta Know". Phoebe Reilly of Vulture wrote that the video also parodies Hole's "Miss World" (1994).

== Release ==
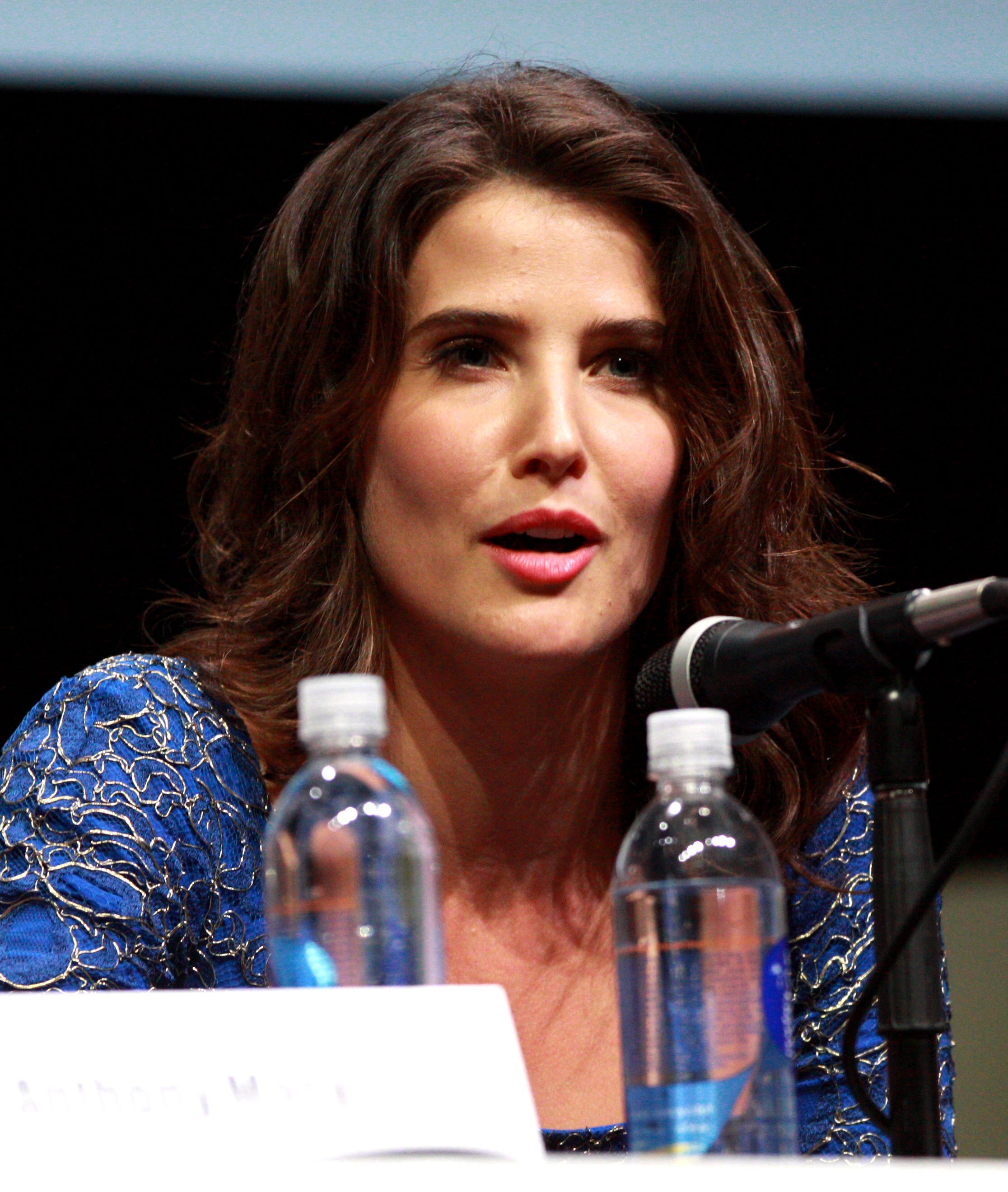
Smulders' performance as Robin Daggers received positive reviews.

"P.S. I Love You" appeared in an episode of the same name which aired on February 4, 2013. A digital single was released by 20th Century Fox Records that day. It was later included on the compilation album, How I Met Your Music: Deluxe (2014). Portions of the music video were shown in the episode; the full video became available in a press release the following day. The video was included in the series' season-eight DVD release. The "P.S. I Love You" episode received a 4/11 Nielsen rating/share in the 18–49 demographic and attracted 10.30 million American viewers, up eight percent from the previous episode. It was the night's top-rated show, and the most-watched of the series' season.

"P.S. I Love You" received generally-positive reviews from television and music critics. Fikse enjoyed the song, which "perfectly mirrored the outsized emotion and angst that characterized the 90s". Caryn Ganz of Spin called Daggers a "Grunge Goddess" and her transformation "angsty badass" and "historically accurate". Max Nicholson of IGN liked Smulders' "angst-ridden" performance, saying that it "was a satisfying redemption" for the season. Margaret Lyons of Vulture wrote that her comeback was "terrific ... maybe the best thing HIMYM has ever done".

Maggie Panos of PopSugar called the video "torrid" and "ominous". Vlada Gelman of TVLine praised Smulders' "anti-conformist" performance in the "hilariously twisted" music video. Gelman also liked the song: "It's damn catchy". According to Mark Perigard of the Boston Herald, the song "gave you all the hints you needed" in a "middling episode". Perigard wrote that it was time to retire the character, and the show could not let go of a good idea. A Yahoo! reviewer said that the song was impossible to "get out of your head". Tom Eames of Digital Spy called "P.S. I Love You" "grunge-tastic", and called Daggers' storyline one of the series' best running gags. Fox News rated it as the series' ninth-best musical moment.
