= How I Met Your Music =

How I Met Your Music (Original Songs from the Hit Series "How I Met Your Mother")

Soundtrack album by The cast of How I Met Your Mother
- Released: September 24, 2012
- Recorded: 2005–11
- Genres: Soundtrack; comedy
- Length: 37:44
- Label: Fox Music

Deluxe artwork
- Album artwork of the 2014 Deluxe version

How I Met Your Music is the name of two albums (the first being followed by the subtitle Original Songs from the Hit Series "How I Met Your Mother", the second being followed by Deluxe) composed of songs from the CBS television series How I Met Your Mother, the first of which was released hours before the Season 8 premiere. It features 20 songs that had appeared in the first seven seasons of the show and was released only digitally, originally through iTunes. A second iteration, titled How I Met Your Music: Deluxe album, was released a year later. It contains an entirely different play list. Many critics have said that the albums reflect the series' consistently effective use of music.

== Show soundtrack summaries ==
Critics have often commented on the series' "thoughtful" use of music. As Rolling Stone noted:

Maybe you liked the show's soundtrack better than its 'surprise' ending? It may have gotten lost in all the meeting-the-mother mythology, catchphrases, slaps and recurring gags, but How I Met Your Mother was an incredibly musically-minded sitcom ... the show had some truly catchy original tunes, ranging from teen pop ... to show tunes ... to death metal ... . If that weren't enough, HIMYM has also been incredibly adept at matching great scenes with great songs.

One critic said the show makes "flawless" music choices that meld with the story. Jessica Blankenship wrote that the show's writers seamlessly "use a song as a punchline, a bridge, or an emotional punctuation mark." It was a hallmark of the series.

In 9 seasons (208 episodes), at least 408 songs were used. (Note: Not including Golden Girl, which is not listed although twice used, and reportedly involved copyright infringement. According to the band's drummer, Tristan Davies, there was a silver lining in the theft: "The exposure was great and we were blown away by the fact that they would even consider something that we'd done – some s***house band in Canberra that no-one's ever heard." The band was paid more than if the song had been properly licensed. The infringement was said to be ironic given the lyrics. "While the producers of television sitcom How I Met Your Mother only used the heavy guitar riffs of TONK's rock tune, ... [the song's opening lines are] 'Out in the streets, it's a dirty dirty living.'".)

Viewers report that the soundtrack varies depending upon forums and media. It is claimed there is a significant discontinuity in the songs that were originally used, the DVD version, and the Netflix versions of the show.

The 100th episode was dubbed "How I Met Your Musical", which presaged the albums' names.

== The albums ==
The very concept of "best" songs from the series is problematic as the many lists of 'iconic' songs vary.

The first album contained about 20 tracks totaling 40 minutes. According to Craig Thomas, a co-creator of How I Met Your Mother, a decision was made to release it without a physical CD, "because that’s so 1992". Entitled How I Met Your Music: Original Songs from the Hit Series, it was originally released digitally to iTunes in 2012, and featured songs from the first seven seasons of the show.

Following the show's end, a second album, How I Met Your Music: Deluxe, was released digitally via iTunes in 2014. It features songs from the final two seasons. One review says it contains 14 of the "most memorable songs of the nine seasons of the series." It includes various actors/artists as performers: Boyz II Men, Wayne Brady, Frances Conroy, Alyson Hannigan, Neil Patrick Harris, John Lithgow, Sam Moore, Cristin Milioti, Jason Segel, Cobie Smulders, The Solids, John Swihart, and Ben Vereen.

== Track listing ==
How I Met Your Music — (Original Songs from the Hit Series "How I Met Your Mother")
No.	Title	Performer(s)	Length
1.	"Hey Beautiful"	The Solids	3:41
2.	"Let's Go to the Mall"	Cobie Smulders	3:18
3.	"Barney Stinson, That Guy's Awesome"	Neil Patrick Harris	0:56
4.	"Best Night Ever"	Jason Segel & Nuno Bettencourt	2:13
5.	"Superdate"	Josh Radnor	1:41
6.	"Food Delivery / Cat Sitting / Cat Funeral"	Jason Segel	1:20
7.	"Shame on You"	Jerry Minor	1:27
8.	"Ode to Virginia"	Harry Groener	1:05
9.	"Murder Train"	The Foreskins	0:33
10.	"Sandcastles in the Sand"	Cobie Smulders	3:38
11.	"Nothing Suits Me Like a Suit"	Neil Patrick Harris & How I Met Your Mother Cast	2:50
12.	"You Just Got Slapped"	Jason Segel	1:41
13.	"The Bro Chant"	Brian H. Kim	1:37
14.	"Mosbius Designs Has Failed"	Josh Radnor	1:24
15.	"Marshall vs. the Machines"	Jason Segel	2:13
16.	"Hey Beautiful (Barney Version)"	Neil Patrick Harris	0:38
17.	"Two Beavers are Better Than One"	Cobie Smulders & Kamille Rudisill	3:25
18.	"Puzzles Theme Song"	Josh Radnor & Neil Patrick Harris	1:05
19.	"Bang Bang Bangity Bang"	How I Met Your Mother Cast	1:10
20.	"You Just Got Slapped (Slo Jam Remix)"	Jason Segel	1:49
Total length:			37:44

How I Met Your Music — Deluxe
No.	Title	Performer(s)	Length
1.	"You Just Got Slapped"	Boyz II Men	1:25
2.	"Marshall vs. The Machines (Journey to Farhampton)"	Jason Segel	1:03
3.	"Night Night Little Marvin"	Jason Segel & Alyson Hannigan	1:21
4.	"On the House"	Cobie Smulders	0:47
5.	"Asking Out Lily Pts. 1 & 2"	Jason Segel	0:31
6.	"Soul Bang"	Sam Moore	1:51
7.	"P.S. I Love You"	Robin Daggers	2:47
8.	"La Vie En Rose"	Cristin Milioti	1:24
9.	"You're All Alone"	John Swihart	3:58
10.	"And There She Was" (featuring John Swihart)	The Solids	4:35
11.	"Mmmm Mmmm Mmmm Mmmm" (HIMYM Version)	Wayne Brady & Alan Thicke	4:51
12.	"Barney Makes 3 Pts 1 & 2"	Francis Conroy, John Lithgow, Ben Vereen, Neil Patrick Harris	1:21
13.	"The Robin"	John Swihart	3:22
14.	"Doppelganger's Tango"	John Swihart	0:50
Total length:			30:06

== Charts ==
Chart (2012)	Peak position
US Top Current Albums (Billboard)	191
US Soundtrack Albums (Billboard)	8
US Top Comedy Albums (Billboard)	1
