= P.S. I Love You (How I Met Your Mother) =

- How I Met Your Mother episode
- Episode no.: Season 8 Episode 15
- Directed by: Pamela Fryman
- Written by: Carter Bays; Craig Thomas
- Original air date: February 4, 2013

Guest appearances
- James Van Der Beek as Simon Tremblay; Abby Elliott as Jeanette; Dave Thomas as Chuck "Chuck" Gerussi; Jason Priestley as himself; Geddy Lee as himself; Alex Trebek as himself; Paul Shaffer as himself; Luc Robitaille as himself; Dave Coulier as himself; k.d. lang as herself; Steven Page as himself; Alan Thicke as himself

Episode chronology
← Previous "Ring Up!"	Next → "Bad Crazy"
- How I Met Your Mother season 8

"P.S. I Love You" is the 15th episode of the eighth season of the CBS sitcom How I Met Your Mother, and the 175th episode overall.

== Plot ==
Ted tells the gang that he found his destined love on the subway—they were both reading One Hundred Years of Solitude—but lost her at the next stop. Ted hopes to find her again, but Marshall and Lily are unsure of this, especially when Ted reveals he has written details he remembered about her. However, Ted indeed reunites with the woman, Jeanette, after a fire alarm at his Columbia building. He believes that it was destiny, since Jeanette had written down details she remembered about him; but could not figure out which class he was at until the fire alarm rang.

Skeptical of Jeanette's intentions toward Ted, Marshall explains that one cannot force destiny, but instead must let it happen, and he describes Lily's seemingly random choice of picking his door to knock on in 1996 at Wesleyan University. Marshall gets Ted to realise that it was unlikely Jeanette just happened to be at the fire alarm, so she must have been stalking him at that point and pulled it in order to meet him. Charmed by the sentiment, Ted explains his theory that a romantic advance could be "Dobler or Dahmer"; an act is only charming if the recipient finds it charming, making it "Dobler" (a reference to Lloyd Dobler in Say Anything...), but if the recipient is creeped out by it, it is "Dahmer" (a reference to American serial killer and sex offender Jeffrey Dahmer). He is charmed by Jeanette, therefore, her pulling the fire alarm is charming. To back up the theory, Robin admits to the gang that she was once a stalker to show how there is a fine line between romance and obsession. When she refuses to tell Barney with whom she was obsessed until he admits that anyone can become obsessed, he breaks into her apartment and reads her teenage journals, and is puzzled by the cryptic phrase "P.S. I Love You".

While Barney flies to Robin's hometown of Vancouver, British Columbia to interview her ex-boyfriends, Ted asks Jeanette about her pulling the fire alarm to force them to meet, and she says it was because she could not "stand the idea of not meeting (him)", leaving Ted once again charmed with her. Marshall makes Ted realize that the fire alarm is actually a smoke detector, meaning to set it off, Jeanette would have had to start a fire; Jeanette admits to this but still, Ted finds it charming. Meanwhile, Robin's co-star from the "Sandcastles in the Sand" video, Simon, reveals to Barney that a MuchMusic documentary about musicians' lives offstage, Underneath The Tunes, discussed Robin's career in an episode.

Marshall gets increasingly irritated that Ted has found Jeanette's behavior attractive, and that their "destiny" was forced. Barney returns with a copy of the Underneath The Tunes episode and shows it to Ted, Marshall, and Lily. Using interviews with many Canadian celebrities, the documentary depicts a picture of Robin's musical career different from how she had described it to the group. Robin had said "Let's Go to the Mall" was a minor hit and "Sandcastles in the Sand" was her artistic follow-up and a total flop, possibly to stop the group from finding out more. However, the documentary reveals both were hits that went "Maple", with "Let's Go to the Mall" going "Double Maple", but Robin's musical career declined in the mid-90s. Dissatisfied with the bubblegum pop-star persona that made her popular, Robin reinvented herself as a grunge singer named Robin Daggers. She made a music video of a song, "P.S. I Love You", that her record company refused to release. Robin's career ended after a disastrous 84th Grey Cup halftime show at which she revealed her new persona as soon as she appeared on stage. When the show speculates that Robin's occasional costar Alan Thicke is the subject of the song, Barney visits him and violently demands the truth; Thicke easily defeats Barney and denies that he was the song's subject.

The badly bruised Barney returns to the others, claiming that he fought Thicke to a draw. The situation forces him to admit that it is easy to end up obsessed over romantic interests. Robin comforts him and reveals that the "P.S." in the song was Paul Shaffer. Barney admits that his jealousy made him a total "Dahmer", but Robin assures him, saying he is her "Dahmer", making him a "Dobler". Ted still insists that his and Jeanette's relationship is likewise, frustrating Marshall, but he is angered when Lily admits that their chance encounter was not chance at all; she had seen him during the freshman orientation and, under the pretense of needing someone to fix her radio, knocked on all doors in Marshall's dorm building until she found him. Despite it being creepy, Marshall slowly finds it charming and concedes to Ted. When Ted is with Jeanette and finds her copy of One Hundred Years of Solitude, he learns that the book was bought within minutes after he bought his copy. Jeanette admits that she has been stalking him since he appeared on the cover of New York magazine in fall 2011. Even still, Ted finds her confession charming and the two start kissing passionately, as Future Ted tells his kids that Jeanette was the last mistake he made before he met his future wife.

== Development ==
The episode describes the ultimate decline of Robin's career as Robin Sparkles, who first appeared in the season 2 episode "Slap Bet", returning in the season 3 episode "Sandcastles in the Sand" (also the name of Sparkles' music video) and the season 6 episode "Glitter". Series co-creator Craig Thomas said it would be a "fitting end" to the show tackling Robin's music past. Dave Coulier's appearance references the theory that Alanis Morissette wrote the song You Oughta Know about him; it also references Coulier's friendship with How I Met Your Mother actor Bob Saget.

== Reception ==
=== Ratings ===
In Canada, the episode was watched by 890,000 viewers through City.

=== Critical reception ===
The episode received positive reviews. Donna Bowman of the A.V. Club gave the episode an A−. Bill Kuchman of TV.com said the episode provided some of the season's funniest moments. IGN's Max Nicholson said the episode was "redemption" for some of the show's rough patches this season. Alan Sepinwall of Uproxx stated that the episode's plot on Robin Sparkles was a "genuine idea" almost as big as her introduction in "Slap Bet".

ScreenCrush described the episode as "good plain fun" and a fitting conclusion to one of the show's best recurring storylines, calling it an entertaining entry before the season's final arc began. We Got This Covered praised the episode for taking the show's recurring Canada jokes to a new level, noting the impressive lineup of Canadian guest stars from the 1990s.

Jason Priestley's line about making a Tim Horton's donut named after him the night of Robin's debacle inspired the fast food chain to make an actual "The Priestley" donut. An in-house food scientist who was a fan of the show developed the item as Priestley described—a Timbit inside a strawberry vanilla donut—within hours of the broadcast. A small batch was eventually made, but the company does not intend to make it part of the menu.
