= The Solids =

Band

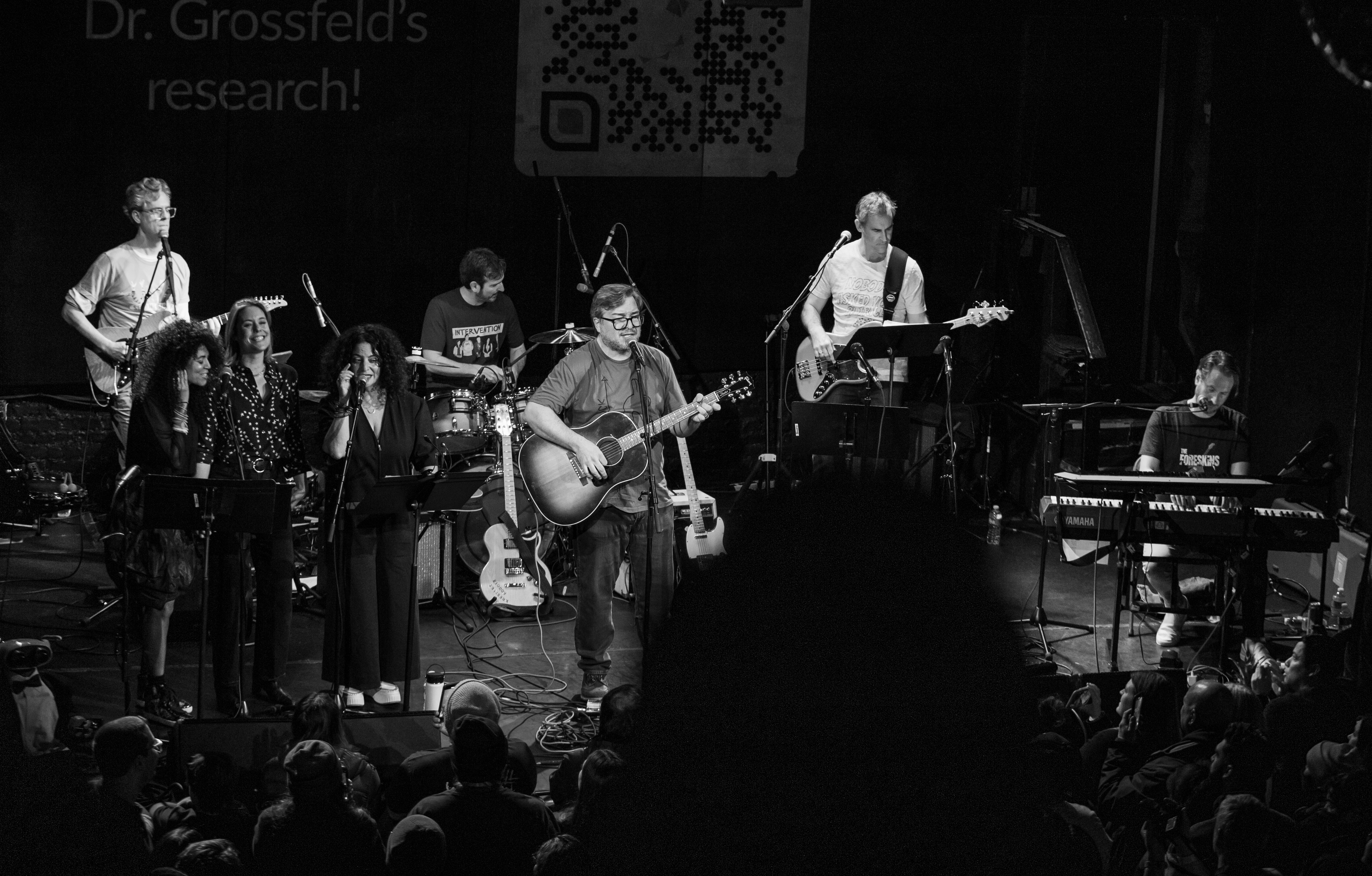
- The Solids in New York in 2025, by Aaron Hoffman

Background information
- Origin: Middletown, Connecticut
- Genres: Power pop, alternative rock
- Years active: 1996–present
- Labels: 20th Century Fox Music, Dominant Records
- Members: Carter Bays; Craig Thomas; Patrick Butler; C.C. DePhil
- Website: thesolids.com

The Solids are an American pop/rock band from Middletown, Connecticut. The band consists of Carter Bays (vocals, guitar), Craig Thomas (drums), Patrick Butler (keyboards), Doug Derryberry (lead guitar) and Josh Suniewick (bass). They have been writing, recording, and performing music since 1996. The Solids first became popular for their song "The Future Is Now," which was the theme song for the Fox television program Oliver Beene. A 12-second clip from their song "Hey, Beautiful" is the theme song for another show, the CBS sitcom How I Met Your Mother which was created by band members Bays and Thomas.

== Background ==
The band was formed in the summer of 1996 by Bays and Thomas. They were joined by Patrick Butler and Nick Coleman and played their first show September 28, 1996, at the Alpha Delta Phi chapter house located at 185 High Street, in Middletown, Connecticut, on the campus of Wesleyan University, where they all studied.

Following the exposure Oliver Beene granted the band, the official website of The Solids became somewhat popular among alternative music fans. Along with "The Future Is Now", various mp3 files were offered for free, including demos and live performances. In 1999, their song "Clowns like Candy" charted as #10 in "Top Alternative Internet Downloads" for issue #825 of Rolling Stone magazine, as well as an "Editor's Pick" for Rolling Stone Online. In 2001, the song was featured on an episode of NBC's Ed about a fictionalized version of the Solids. The band released its self-titled album on January 24, 2008.

Throughout the 9 seasons of How I Met Your Mother, many original songs written by the band's founders appeared on the show and were turned into full-length music videos. Among these, CinemaBlend called "Let's Go to the Mall", performed by Cobie Smulders as her Robin Sparkles character "one of the best TV-created pop songs of all time", and "Nothing Suits Me Like a Suit" was nominated for the Primetime Emmy Award for Outstanding Original Music and Lyrics, charted at #50 in UK Singles Chart and peaked at 76 on the Canadian Top 100.

Since 2019, the band has been regularly performing sold-out charity concerts for pediatric cardiology at Rady Children's Hospital that have included guest performances by Josh Radnor, Cristin Milioti, Ashley Williams, Will Forte, Jamie-Lynn Sigler, J.P. Manoux, Matthew Caws of Nada Surf, Keith Slettedahl of The 88, and other actors and musicians featured in How I Met Your Mother.
