= Ring Up! =

- How I Met Your Mother episode
- Episode no.: Season 8 Episode 14
- Directed by: Pamela Fryman
- Written by: Jennifer Hendriks
- Original air date: January 21, 2013

Guest appearance
- Ashley Benson as Carly Whittaker

Episode chronology
← Previous "Band or DJ?"	Next → "P.S. I Love You"
- How I Met Your Mother season 8

"Ring Up!" is the 14th episode of the eighth season of the CBS sitcom How I Met Your Mother, and the 174th episode overall.

== Plot ==
Ted meets a new girlfriend who turns out to be a leather cuff salesperson just slightly younger than 21 who convinced him to buy a leather cuff, so the gang is unable to meet her in person at MacLaren's. While he finds her really attractive, their age difference means he has trouble connecting with her. When he is about to end things with her, Barney convinces him to give it a shot, which will allow Barney to live vicariously through Ted now that Barney is engaged to Robin. Ted is about to end it with her upon realizing she has a really strong fetish for old people (Her believing him to be a senior citizen despite him only being in his 30s), but finally gives in when he realizes she likes Star Wars. After they sleep together, however, Barney finds out that she is actually Carly, his half-sister, and is furious at this betrayal. Later, Barney attempts to marry Ted and Carly, and mentions that he finds the idea of a one-night stand "cheap, meaningless and disgusting". Both Ted and Barney then realize that Barney is done with his detox from one-night stands. Though happy with this freedom, Barney urges Ted and Carly not to sleep with each other again.

While Barney struggles with his detox, Robin is going through her own struggles as well—she has difficulty getting used to being engaged. Where she used to get freebies by being a single, beautiful young woman, the ring now deprives her of them—including buying herself a beer at MacLaren's. However, Marshall and Lily assure her that when she looks at the man she loves, everyone else becomes invisible. Later that night, Robin understands the true power of her ring when she looks at Barney, and cleverly solves her problems by asking Barney to help buy her a drink instead.

Meanwhile, Marshall takes to wearing Ted's leather cuff as it turns Lily on. This is in spite of the fact that his wrist starts swelling and eventually gives off a horrible smell. Lily finally explains that he does not need the leather cuff to turn her on. Afterwards, Lily receives a pair of elastic waist jeans in the mail by mistake, which turns out to be a big turn-on for Marshall.

== Music ==
- "Hey, Beautiful" – The Solids
- "On the House" – performed by Cobie Smulders
- "Treulich geführt" (Bridal Chorus from Lohengrin) – Richard Wagner
- "What Would I Do Without You" – Drew Holcomb & The Neighbors

== Critical reception ==
Donna Bowman of the A.V. Club gave the episode a C+. She wrote that the episode treated Barney's "long history as a character defined by his womanizing" as "either as a source for lazy jokes, or as a story problem to be gotten past as quickly and sloppily as the show can get away with." She also objected to how Carly is "shoehorned into this recovery-from-sex-addiction business" because it is "far less than what this particular character arc deserves."

Max Nicholson of IGN gave the episode a score of 4.9/10 (Bad). Overall, he commented that "no single story arc pulled through as particularly engaging or eventful, and there were seldom any laughs" and called the episode "one of the bigger duds this season." He also said it "lacked originality, wit and humor – although, there was plenty of sleaze."

Angel Cohn of Television Without Pity gave the episode a B, but qualified the grade as a result of "grading on the curve of this season". Cohn also described the episode as "not terrible" and "not total torture". Commenting on how the conclusions of Barney and Robin's separate stories in the episode brings them closer together, Cohn "grudgingly tolerated their cutesy 'could I love you more' stuff, since at least it made them seem like a real couple... who we want to occasionally punch."
