= Omnibot =

1980s toy robot manufactured by Tomy

The Omnibot (オムニボット) is a toy robot originally manufactured by Tomy in the mid-1980s. The name then came to apply to the successful line of robots manufactured by the company. The initial Omnibot was announced with expectations of restoring popular interest in robots, at a time when it was becoming obvious that robots with advanced AI were still a long way away. A more advanced version of the Omnibot was called the Omnibot 2000 and did not have a plastic bubble over its head. With the success of the Omnibots, the Omnibot range quickly expanded. After the video game crash of 1983 and its debilitating effect on the nascent home electronics industry, the Omnibot faded away but it was revived in the early 2000s. The latest version of the Omnibot is the i-SOBOT.

Both the Omnibot and the more advanced Omnibot 2000 had a cassette tape player built into the chest area of the robot, which slid out like a drawer to reveal the cassette and could record and play back sequences of commands, as well as regular audio recordings. The built in digital clock with timers and alarms allowed the playback of movement recordings at specified times, such as moving into the bedroom in the morning. Both robots were able to broadcast speech from the remote control handset through a speaker on the robot, and both were shipped with a cardboard "home" base which was suggested to be taped to the floor and used as a reference point for programming.

Both Omnibot and the Omnibot 2000 could carry light objects. The Omnibot carried a specially made tray which slotted into its claws, and the Omnibot 2000 had a tray which slotted into its motorised "accessory panel", allowing the tray to revolve cups and glasses into the reach of the arm.

The Omnibot 2000 was 25 inches tall, powered by a 6-volt lead–acid battery and two AA batteries. Its right arm was controllable. The user could control its shoulder, elbow, wrist and fingers, the left arm being a poseable "dummy".

Losing the remote control unit for an Omnibot meant that the robot was virtually useless outside of the clock and cassette deck based functions.

Two lesser known robots in the Omnibot range were the Omnibot OOM and the Omniwagon. The Omnibot OOM was shaped like a standard Omnibot except with the addition of a spherical head, its remote controller including a basic form of voice-control. The Omniwagon was a remote controlled drive unit and wheels from an omnibot with a flat surface on top to carry objects. The unit could also follow routes drawn out in black tape.

== Related robots ==
=== Omnibot OOM / Hearoid ===
The 1985 Omnibot OOM (#TR6000) from Tomy TTC, released to North America in 1985 by Tomy TTC as "Hearoid" (#2010), was largely based on the standard Omnibot unit (#5402). Changes included a new anthropomorphic head design with a bubble-lens enclosing the face (whereas the 5402's 'head' was encased by a bubble dome). The OOM's 'eyes' illuminated rather like car headlights via two small 3V lightbulbs, and a third flashing light behind a lens strip was used to visually represent a 'mouth' à la Verbot (#5401). Additionally the OOM's cassette control panel was divergent in design, reminiscent of an 1980s car stereo cassette deck. The robot came with a more sophisticated remote controller which included primitive voice control.

=== Robie Sr. ===
As with numerous other products, Tandy's RadioShack would retail their own version of Omnibot OOM / Hearoid in 1986, releasing it as "Robie Sr." (#60-2398). Custom manufactured in Japan and South Korea, it was essentially the same as Tomy TTC's OOM but with its cassette control panel replaced with that of the standard Omnibot unit (#5402). Sound effects are also different, as is product coloration.

=== Omnibot Jr. "Charmmy"/Robie Jr. ===
The Omnibot Jr., also known as the "Charmmy", was a 10.5 inches (27 cm) tall remote controlled robot with an attachable tray, featuring styling reminiscent of the original Omnibot. Simultaneously released by Radio Shack as the Robie Jr., Omnibot Jr. included a microphone on either side of the robot's head that allowed it to hear an ultrasonic sound emitted by the remote controller. The dual microphones allowed Charmmy to determine the rough direction of the controller, and navigate to its location, sometimes even around corners. The Omnibot Jr. was also equipped with a bump sensor that allowed it to navigate around objects, and this sensor was also used along with sensors in the arms to trigger several recorded announcements should the robot bump into an object or an item be placed on the tray.

=== Verbot/KI*KU*ZO ===
The classic Omnibot had a cheaper, smaller cousin known as the Verbot, known in its native Japan as the KI*KU*ZO. At nine inches tall, the Verbot was the mid-sized option compared to the smaller Dingbot and the larger Omnibot. It was somewhat similar to the Omnibot in appearance but was much more limited in features. The Verbot also came with a wireless remote control that could operate the robot through voice commands. Up to eight commands could be programmed. The Verbot could move forward and backward, left and right, on command. The Verbot was also able to pick up small objects, a feature many toy robots of the era lacked. The robot expressed some personality by blinking and smiling. Disadvantages common to the Verbot were that it was quite noisy, reprogramming was necessary every time the robot was powered up again, and as with all of the Omnibot series, its white plastic body would turn yellow if left in the sun. The Verbot was actually quite complex, utilizing a single motor for all its movements and an intricate set of gears for picking up objects. Programming Verbot was accomplished by pushing one of the buttons on its front panel and holding it down while the corresponding action was spoken into the remote control's microphone and then releasing the button. As with most Omnibots, losing the remote meant the robot could not be used to full capacity, but some hobbyists have modified cheap 1980s walkie-talkies for inputting voice commands.

== Omnibots today ==
In recent times, many hobbyists have turned to hacking, tweaking and improving their Omnibots. Commonly added features are IR Sensors, video cameras, speech recognition chips, stronger motors, microcontrollers, sonars and other advanced enhancements that would not have been possible in the 80s.

In the early 2000s, a gutted Omnibot was used as part of a contestant on the US television show BattleBots. The robot, named Dr. Inferno Jr. (an updated version of another combat robot that used a gutted Omnibot) won several awards in the competition's "Lightweight Division". The Omnibot on top of the drivetrain had no dome on top, and its arms were replaced with twin saws.

An Omnibot 2000 was a recurring character on How I Met Your Mother. The Robot is seen in flashbacks to Robin Scherbatsky's teen years in Canada, where it was her consistent sidekick, appearing on her TV series Space Teens and her three music videos. The Robot inexplicitly appears in the "present day" settings, dancing next to Robin when she sings "The Beaver Song" at the Hoser Hut and (in a deleted scene) "Let's Go to the Mall" at her own wedding reception.

=== i-SOBOT ===
In 2006, shortly after the merger of Tomy and Takara, the company first unveiled a prototype for a new Omnibot, initially called "Omnibot 2007: i-SOBOT" but which has since been officially named, "Omnibot 17μ: i-SOBOT" ("μ" is the Greek letter "mu" symbolizing micron, referring to the specs of the servo motors) in Japan and simply "i-SOBOT" in the U.S. market. i-SOBOT was scheduled to go on sale in Japan in October 2007 (Japanese language with blue and white color), but an English language, black and grey version went on sale first in the U.S., in September of the same year.

i-SOBOT, which has been certified by Guinness World Records as "the world's smallest humanoid robot in production", is equipped with 17 proprietary servo-motors and can be controlled by an IR remote controller and also via voice commands. It is capable of speaking hundreds of words and phrases and has nearly 200 pre-programmed actions, plus allows additional programming by the user via the remote control. The retail price is approximately ¥30,000 in Japan and $350 in the U.S. i-SOBOT is fully bi-pedal. In 2013 Tomy released the new robot called i-SODOG.

== See also ==
- Topo, a contemporary of Omnibot, aimed at the consumer and educational market.
- '80s Robot, a similar looking Muppet character.
- Cassette tape
