= Let's Go to the Mall =

Single by Robin Sparkles (Note: In How I Met Your Music, Smulders was credited as the song's artist instead of Robin Sparkles.)

from the album How I Met Your Music
- Released: September 4, 2007
- Recorded: 2006
- Genre: Comedy; teen pop
- Length: 3:16
- Label: 20th Century Fox Records; Fox Music
- Songwriters: Craig Thomas; Carter Bays
- Producer: John Swihart

How I Met Your Mother singles chronology
"Hey Beautiful" (2007)	"Let's Go to the Mall" (2007)	"Sandcastles in the Sand" (2008)

"Let's Go to the Mall" is a song written by Craig Thomas and Carter Bays for the CBS television series How I Met Your Mother. The song was performed by Canadian actress Cobie Smulders in the role of Robin Scherbatsky, who has a secret past of being a teenage Canadian pop star and adopted the stage name Robin Sparkles. Thomas and Bays originally came up with the idea and spent weeks developing the story with writer Kourtney Kang. The song was first featured in the form of a faux music video in the episode "Slap Bet" that aired on November 20, 2006, before the song was digitally released as a single on September 4, 2007. The track later appeared on the soundtrack album How I Met Your Music (2012).

"Let's Go to the Mall" is a teen pop song, in which Robin invites people to come to the shopping mall and have fun. The lyrics contain references to both the 1980s and Canadian culture, such as jelly bracelets, hockey player Wayne Gretzky and Prime Minister Brian Mulroney. "Let's Go to the Mall" garnered generally positive reviews from both television and music critics, who praised its catchiness and humor. Several media publications listed it among the show's best musical sequences. It has sold 4,000 digital downloads in the United States as of August 2008, and the music video attracted more than 300,000 viewers on MySpace and the CBS official website. Robin Sparkles became a running gag throughout the show; Smulders later reprised the role in "Sandcastles in the Sand" (2008), "Glitter" (2010), and her alter-ego as Robin Daggers in "P.S. I Love You" (2013).

== Background ==
Cobie Smulders played Robin Scherbatsky, a devoted broadcast journalist who moves from Canada for a job in New York, in the CBS television series How I Met Your Mother. During its first season, creators and executive producers Craig Thomas and Carter Bays wanted to make the character Canadian after learning that Smulders is also Canadian. "[Thomas and Bay] thought [being Canadian] was exotic—which is the very first time I've ever been called that," Smulders said. Robin's Canadian side was initially intended to reflect on "the absurdity of American culture", but the creators later turned it into a medium for satire and jokes instead. "It's such filthy lucre for writers... We just couldn't stop ourselves," Bays said. Robin was first revealed to be Canadian in "Belly Full of Turkey".

In June 2006, executive producer Greg Malins submitted the idea of a music video starring one of the characters, and he picked out Robin. After watching a young Matt LeBlanc play a cameo role in Alanis Morissette's music video for "Walk Away", the creators decided to create Robin's secret past of being a Canadian pop star who "never became legit". The creators worked with writer Kourtney Kang to develop the story into an episode, feeling like they "finally cracked it" after weeks of work. Kang said that in an earlier version of the story, Robin was part of a duo and had to go back to Canada to help "resurrect her career". She was excited about the storyline, saying "I love the '80s [...] So this was a gift from the heavens."

In the episode, character Robin Scherbatsky revealed that she was a Canadian teenage pop star, using the stage name Robin Sparkles, which embarrassed her as an adult. "Let's Go to the Mall", released in 1993 on an album called Make It Sparkle by Dominant Records, became a minor hit in the country. 16-year-old Robin used to travel to shopping malls and sing the song, while living off of Orange Julius and Wetzel's Pretzels. Robin explained that despite being recorded in the early 1990s, the song and video were influenced by the late 1980s style because the 1980s "didn't come to Canada until '93".

== Writing and recording ==
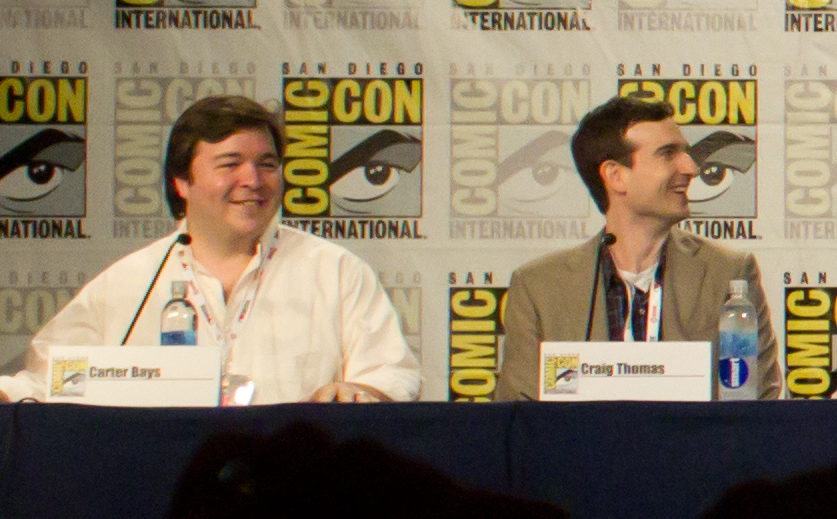
Carter Bays (left) and Craig Thomas (right), creators and executive producers of the show, wrote the song.

Bays and Thomas enjoy writing songs together. When they were working as writers for American Dad! and Late Show with David Letterman, they did several songs and fake musical numbers for the shows. They composed and performed "Hey Beautiful", the theme song of How I Met Your Mother, credited as The Solids. For "Let's Go to the Mall", the creators were inspired by Morissette's "cheesy" material from her pre-Jagged Little Pill years. The lyrics came after the title, with the writers using the name "Let's Go To The Mall" as their inspiration. According to Thomas, the song originally "started off too big" and contained several acts. Eventually, it was incorporated into Robin and Ted's "small relationship story" about trust and secrets, which Thomas believed was "the only reason the episode came together".

Smulders, who had taken singing lessons the previous year, was nervous and excited when she first heard about the song. She later went to the recording studio with Thomas, where he described her as "the most nervous" he had seen throughout the entire process. "I was really terrified, because I just didn't want to suck! ... But it was in the top ten of the most fun I've ever had," Smulders said. According to Thomas, they drank alcohol in the studio to help Smulders channel her "inner 16-year-old to great effect". Smulders improvised the line "I love my hoop earrings!" in a Valley Girl accent and it was later added to the song. Thomas was pleased by Smulders performance, saying "She's fantastic at it... We just thought it would be fun to do and she just nailed it."

== Composition and lyrics ==
"Let's Go to the Mall" was written by Thomas and Bays. It is a teen pop song with a runtime of 3:16. The song is a tongue-in-cheek homage to 1980s American pop music, featuring "robot vocoders, skater 'tudes, and brat-rap breakdowns," according to the staff of Spin. The song was also noted for its "brain-burrowing and persuasive" chorus, and "frothy pop tunes". Erin Strecker and Margaret Lyons of Entertainment Weekly described the track as "carefree" and "blissful[ly] innocent", and CBC.ca called it "campy". Spin and Mark Graham of VH1 both compared "Let's Go to the Mall" to the bubblegum pop tracks of Debbie Gibson and Tiffany. Meanwhile, the song reminded Miss Alli of Television Without Pity of Deniece Williams' "Let's Hear It for the Boy", and Boston Herald's Mark Perigard felt it was "Canada's answer to Debbie Boone".

In "Let's Go to the Mall", Robin invites people to come to the shopping mall and have fun. She giggles girlishly throughout the song, and performs a rap at one point. She uses both valley girl and Canadian accent, which Noel Murray from The A.V. Club found "unobtrusive". The song begins with the line, "Let's go to the mall everybody! Go!". Several references about women's fashion in the 1980s can be heard in the song, including jelly bracelets, graffiti-coats, hoop earrings, and Benetton shirts. The line "Put on your jelly bracelets and your cool graffiti coat" was compared to the work of Tiffany by Donna Bowman from The A.V. Club. It also mentions a number of Canadian cultural figures, such as Canada Day, former Prime Minister Brian Mulroney, and former professional ice hockey player Wayne Gretzky. Spin felt that the song "took things to the Upper Plaza level" by mentioning such icons.

== Music video ==
Smulders as Robin Sparkles (centre) on the set of the music video. Her appearance is reminiscent of Debbie Gibson's music videos during the Electric Youth-era and Tiffany's "I Think We're Alone Now".

In 2006, the creators decided to make "an embarrassing piece of videotape footage" for every main character from the show, beginning with Barney Stinson (Neil Patrick Harris) in his pre-ladies man days shown in an episode in season 1, "Game Night". According to the lead stylist Reiko Kurumada, the main idea of the video was to emulate the style of Tiffany. For Robin Sparkles's costume, the crew researched Tiffany's old videos. The clothing and jewelry shown in the video were taken from various sources, including Universal Studios, American Apparel, shops on Melrose and other costume houses. "We had so much fun vintage shopping for old turquoise cowboy boots and acid washed denim," she recalled. The crew also studied 1980s music videos, including the video for Debbie Gibson's "Electric Youth", which Thomas described as "an amazing piece of footage". Smulders watched Gibson's live performance of "Electric Youth" on The Arsenio Hall Show for inspiration.

The faux music video for "Let's Go to the Mall", and the episode "Slap Bet" as a whole, was directed by Pamela Fryman. It was filmed when the production of its parent episode had completed several days earlier, and the cast had a week off, except for Smulders. It took her two days to learn the choreography from Kristin Denehy, the choreographer who played Barney's cousin and arranged Jason Segel's routine in the "Okay Awesome" episode. Kristin was also writer Kourtney Kang's cousin; Kang was "amazed" when she realized it was her relative.

Despite taking many sets and props, the video was filmed in one day, with Smulders acting in forty takes. The classroom scene was the first to be filmed, followed by the main mall set. In the afternoon, Smulders went on to perform in front of a green screen, in the food court scene, and sequences with the band played by crew members. "It was so easy for everyone involved ... That was the greatest day ever," Thomas recalled.

The video begins in a classroom, where Robin wears a schoolgirl outfit and a blonde wig. She begs a teacher for forgiveness for being a "bad girl" and decides to sing him a song. Robin is then seen wearing a stonewashed denim miniskirt, a pair of leggings, and a matching jacket that has her name graffitied on the back, with the sleeves rolled up in a shopping mall. Her appearance is reminiscent of Debbie Gibson in the music videos during the Electric Youth-era and Tiffany's "I Think We're Alone Now". She moves around the set, where a fictional "La Chocolatiere" store can be seen in the background, takes part in a "highly choreographed" performance and interacts with various props. The video then cuts to scenes where she performs with a band sporting 1980s hairstyles. At one point, she sings the line "I'm going to rock your body until Canada Day" in front of a giant Canadian flag. Robin's sidekick, an Omnibot 2000, is also featured in the video.

== Release ==
The song was first featured in "Slap Bet", the ninth episode in season 2, which aired on November 20, 2006. The episode was originally titled "Robin Sparkles," but it was changed to "Slap Bet" in order to avoid giving away the ending. Prior to its premiere, the creators also put up a page for Robin Sparkles on MySpace, a "creative" way to promote the show that the creators came up with from the beginning of the season. "Let's Go to the Mall" and "Hey Beautiful" were released as digital singles by 20th Century Fox Records and Fox Music on September 4, 2007, (Note: The release date for "Let's Go to the Mall" on iTunes Store was falsely credited as January 1, 1993.) and later included in the soundtrack album How I Met Your Music (2012). Portions of the music video were shown in "Slap Bet". The full three-minute footage became available on MySpace and CBS.com after its TV premiere; there was a tag at the end of the episode that encouraged viewers to watch the full video online. It was also included in the show's season 2 DVD release.

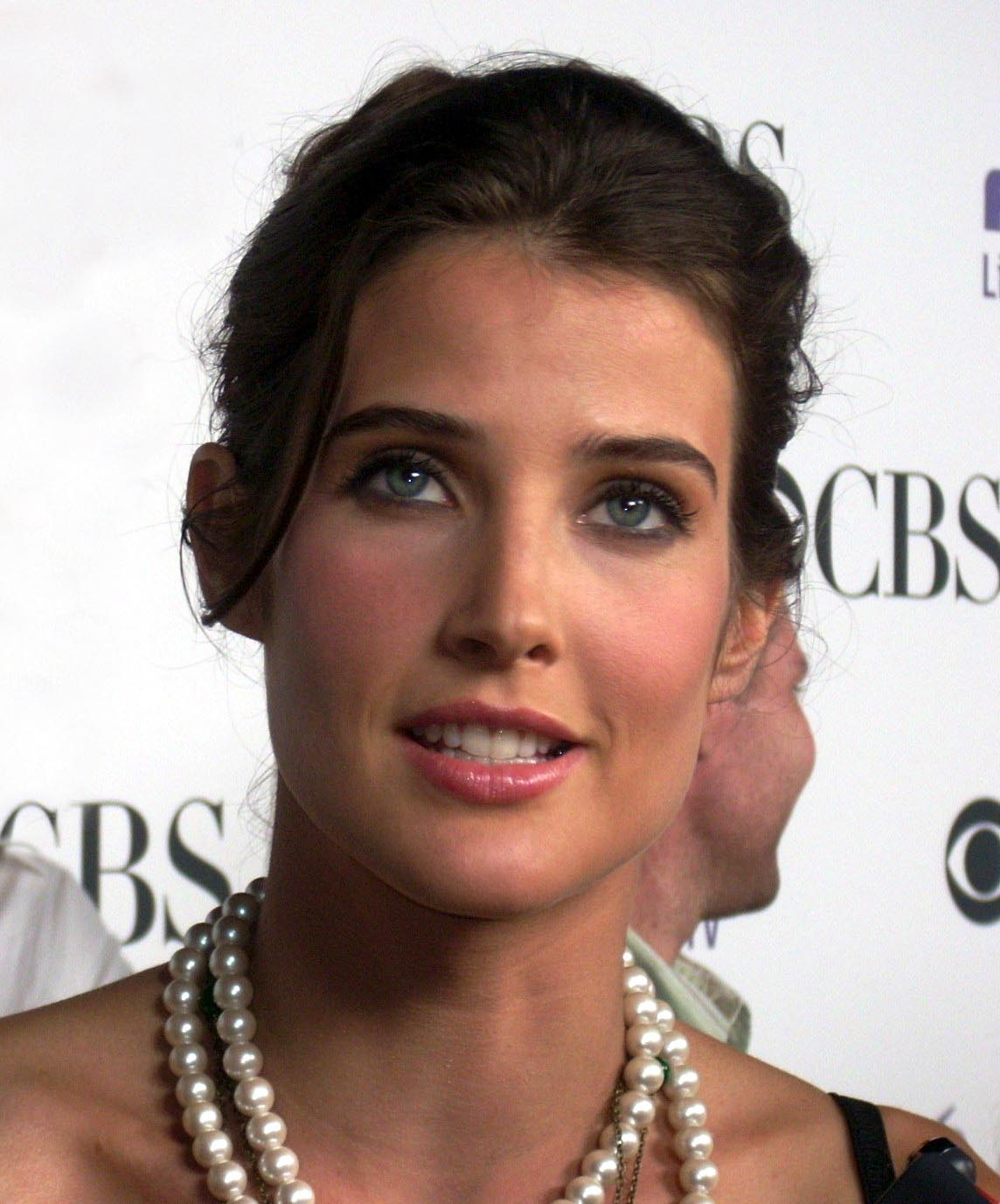
Smulders' performance received critical acclaim. She reprised the role of Robin Sparkles in three more episodes.

"Let's Go to the Mall" garnered generally positive reviews from both television and music critics. Perigard was impressed by Robin Sparkles's "genius" first appearance, and further called the song "an insanely catchy comic number". Eric Goldman of IGN enjoyed Smulders' "exuberant" performance, declaring it "may be the most awesome thing [he has] ever seen" and said that the backup dancers were "perfectly cast". Tom Eames of Digital Spy thought that the song was "actually pretty damn good," while calling the video "possibly HIMYM's finest moment" and "pure gold". Amos Barshad of Vulture called the "Tiffany-indebted" music video an "undeniable highlight" for the show, and it was the "closest the show has ever come to touching the kind of sharp pop-culture-skewering 30 Rock tosses off several times an episode." Eric Eisenberg of Cinema Blend praised Smulders' performance as "maddening and hilarious," while calling the track "one of the best TV-created pop songs of all time".

Vlada Gelman of TVLine described Robin Sparkles first appearance as "infectious" and "an unexpected and hilarious surprise". She went on to rank it as the show's "Best Song and Dance Moments." Fox News ranked it as the second-best musical moments of the show, said that the song set the standard for the show's follow-up musical numbers by its "compulsively catchy tune". On VH1 "Best Best (Fake) Songs Written For TV" list, Stacy Lambe ranked the song at number two, and wrote that it is "the best mall jam. Ever." Spin ranked it as number eight in "The 50 Best Fictional Songs of All Time" list, summarizing the song as "the late-'80s mall-pop explosion" and one of the "pitch-perfect period singles" from the show. Rolling Stone named it the second-best moment from the show, described the video as "a pitch-perfect send-up of neon revelry, synchronized dance, bad rapping, and corny, faux-candid close-ups à la Debbie Gibson".

"Slap Bet" received a 3.1/8 Nielsen rating/share in the 18–49 demographic and attracted 8.85 million American viewers during its initial broadcast. Within the first 10 days after its premiere, the full music video of "Let's Go to the Mall" attracted more than 300,000 viewers on MySpace and the CBS official website. On YouTube, it reached more than 430,000 viewers as of March 2009. Promotion through social media helped the show generate an estimated 600,000 additional viewers for the next episode. Variety reported that Robin Sparkles's debut appearance attracted 5,000 new friends on her MySpace page, and more than 1 million new viewers for the show. According to Nielsen SoundScan, the song has sold 4,000 digital downloads in the United States as of August 2008.

== Later appearances ==
Smulders considers filming the video for "Let's Go to a Mall" to be a big moment for her throughout the show, saying "it was just such an unusual moment playing a character who’s playing this character. It was just a blast." In 2013, she said that "Let’s Go To the Mall" was "extremely catchy" and praised the writers for their ability "to write a very catchy song". Her alter-ego as Robin Sparkles became one of the running gags of the show. The song itself went on to appear in two episodes in season 4: Marshall Eriksen (Segel) performs a karaoke version of the song in "Little Minnesota"; and Ted Mosby (Josh Radnor) uses it as his ringtone in "As Fast as She Can". In 2011, the track became available in the video game Just Dance 3. In 2014, a cut scene from the final episode features Robin singing "Let's Go to the Mall" in her wedding dress with the acid washed jean jacket over it.

Smulders reprised her role as Robin Sparkles in three more episodes. In season 3's "Sandcastles in the Sand", she released a song of the same name, with a music video featuring Tiffany, Alan Thicke, and her teenage boyfriend Simon (James Van Der Beek). Robin Sparkles appeared on Canadian children's show Space Teens with Alan Thicke and her friend Jessica Glitter (Nicole Scherzinger) in season 6's "Glitter". Sparkles and Glitter sing a song called "The Beaver Song" together on the show. She hit her breaking point in February 1996, when she changed her stage name to Robin Daggers and released a grunge-influenced track called "P.S. I Love You", which was revealed in a faux documentary that appeared in an episode of the same name in season 8. "Sandcastles in the Sand" and "P.S. I Love You" were released as stand-alone singles in 2008 and 2013, respectively. An alternative version of "The Beaver Song"—titled "Two Beavers are Better Than One", performed by Smulders and Kamille Rudisill—was included in How I Met Your Music.

Smulders sang the song live at the 2013 San Diego Comic-Con, and the 2016 Portuguese Comic-Con. In a 2016 interview with Peter Travers on ABC News's Popcorn, she sang the song in the style of Bob Dylan. In May 2020, during the COVID-19 pandemic, Smulders performed a COVID-19-themed parody of the song entitled "Let's All Stay at Home" for an Instagram Live session, which was rewritten by Thomas, Bays and Brian Kim.
