= Sandcastles in the Sand (song) =

2008 single by Robin Sparkles

Single by Robin Sparkles (Note: In How I Met Your Music, Smulders was credited as the song's artist instead of Robin Sparkles.)

from the album How I Met Your Music
- Released: April 23, 2008
- Genre: Pop
- Length: 3:33
- Label: 20th Century Fox Records; Fox Music
- Songwriters: Craig Thomas; Carter Bays
- Producer: John Swihart

How I Met Your Mother singles chronology
"Let's Go to the Mall" (2007)	"Sandcastles in the Sand" (2008)	"Ted Mosby Is a Jerk" (2008)

"Sandcastles in the Sand" is a song written by Craig Thomas and Carter Bays for the CBS television series How I Met Your Mother. The song was performed by Canadian actress Cobie Smulders in the role of Robin Scherbatsky, who has a secret past as a teenage Canadian pop star under the stage name Robin Sparkles. A follow-up to "Let's Go to the Mall" (2006), "Sandcastles in the Sand" was inspired by several 1980s pop ballads. The song was made available for streaming on April 15, 2008, before it appeared in an episode of the same name that aired on April 21. It was released as a single on April 23, and appeared on the soundtrack album How I Met Your Music (2012).

"Sandcastles in the Sand" is a breakup ballad song about teenage love. The music video was shot at Zuma Beach, California, featuring Tiffany, Alan Thicke, and James Van Der Beek as her love interest. Television and music critics praised the song's humor and compared it to "Let's Go to the Mall". It had sold 1,000 digital downloads in the United States as of August 2008, and the music video attracted more than 70,000 views online after 3 days of release. Smulders later reprised the role of Robin Sparkles in "Glitter" (2010) and "P.S. I Love You" (2013). Thicke and Van Der Beek also returned in multiple episodes.

== Background and recording ==
Cobie Smulders played Robin Scherbatsky, a devoted broadcast journalist who moves from Canada for a job in New York, in the CBS television series How I Met Your Mother. In season 2's "Slap Bet" (2006), the character was revealed to have been a Canadian teen pop star under the stage name Robin Sparkles. That episode featured the song "Let's Go to the Mall", which had sold 4,000 digital downloads in the United States as of August 2008, while its music video received more than 300,000 viewers on MySpace and the CBS official website within the 10 days of its TV premiere. Smulders was pleased about the favorable reception towards the song, calling it "hilarious".

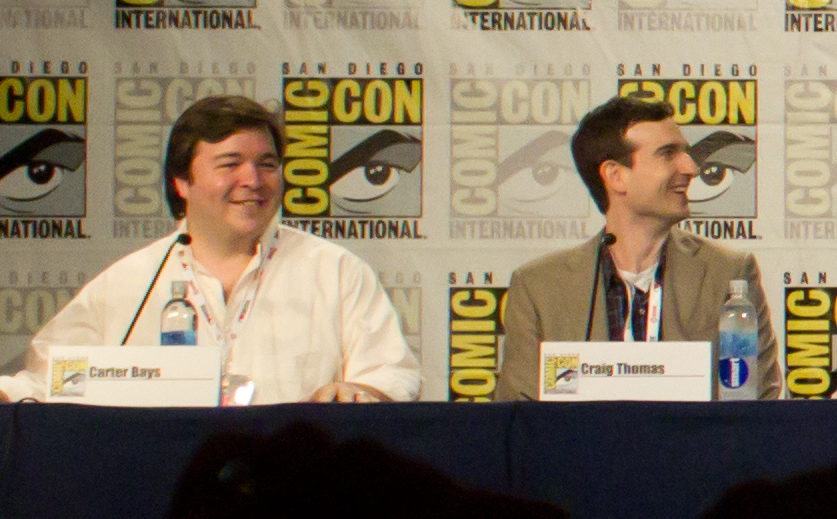
"Sandcastles in the Sand" was one of the three original songs written by the creators, Carter Bays and Craig Thomas (pictured), for season 3.

During the production of "Slap Bet", creators and executive producers Craig Thomas and Carter Bays had deliberated over the idea of bringing back Robin's musical past in a later season. Thomas revealed that the storyline would mention another song by her that "wasn't as big a hit". Bays said that they had to "somehow build on [the storyline] or find a new dimension to it," and that the song would be "the perfect way to see another side of [Sparkles]". Kourtney Kang, who wrote "Slap Bet", had been "pushing for another [Robin Sparkles episode]" and was excited when they got a chance to do it.

In March 2008, Thomas confirmed that there would be an episode featuring Robin Sparkles in season 3, with a B-side song to "Let's Go to the Mall". Titled "Sandcastles in the Sand", it was one of the three original songs written by Thomas and Bays for season 3, along with "Ted Mosby is a Jerk" and "You Just Got Slapped". They found the inspiration for "Sandcastles in the Sand" from several 1980s pop ballads, particularly Belinda Carlisle's "Circle in the Sand" (1988), Debbie Gibson's "Foolish Beat" (1988), and Martika's "Toy Soldiers" (1989). Smulders spent hours in the recording studio with Thomas, where she changed parts of the audio "bit by bit". Thomas noticed her voice became "raspy" at nine in the morning. John Swihart, one of the show's composers, advised her to eat a green apple to smoothen it. Thomas and Smulders were pleased with the recording session and the final results. Smulders improvised the line "I'm on the pill now!" and it was later added to the song. "The technology that these studios now have is pretty amazing. Anyone can go in and come out sounding OK, so I have that on my side," Smulders said.

In the episode, character Robin Scherbatsky reveals that "Sandcastles in the Sand" was a less-successful artistic follow-up to her minor hit "Let's Go To The Mall", with both songs released by Dominant Records on an album called Make It Sparkle. It was about her first boyfriend Simon, who led a rock band and had a collection of Hard Rock Cafe T-shirts. The couple met while making the music video for the song and broke up behind his van after spending a week and a half together.

== Composition ==
Written by Bays and Thomas, it is a breakup ballad song with a runtime of 3 minutes and 33 seconds. Lyrically, "Sandcastles in the Sand" discusses teenage love. The creators labeled it a "slow, mournful breakup song"; Smulders, on the other hand, called it a "pretty funny" and "a love ballad about teen heartbreak". The song begins with the line, "Met you at the mall / Didn't know how far I would fall". She recalls "the greatest week and a half" of her life with her love interest: he taught her how to french kiss and they were "gonna travel the globe / From Alberta to Ontario". Lines such as "You're a fool!", "Shut up!", or "I'm on the pill now!" can be heard in the background.

Kelly West of Cinema Blend thought that the song resembles "every other moany pop-ballad from the 80's". PopSugar and Isabelle Carreau of TV Squad described it as a "wistful", "touching", "overwrought, obviously-written-by-a-16-year-old" ballad. Whitney Pastorek of Entertainment Weekly felt that it was a "heartwrenching B-side" track, and CBC.ca called it "campy". Vlada Gelman of TVLine declared the song a "temporary foray into semi-serious balladry". Alyssa Fikse of Uproxx noted similarities from the song to Gibson's power ballad "Only in My Dreams" (1986). Fox News interpreted the recording as a "melodramatic torch song ... near and dear to Robin's heart".

== Music video ==
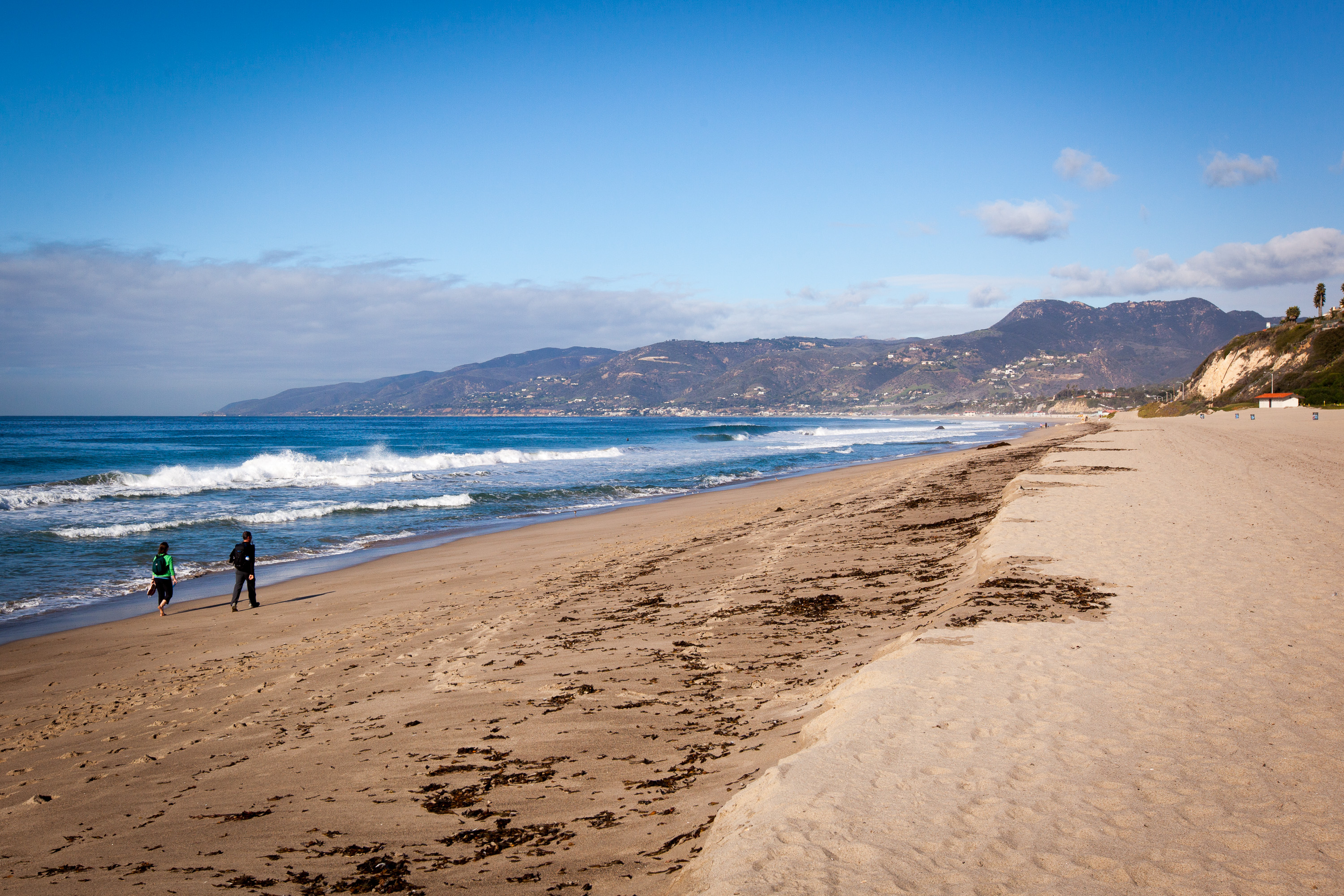
The music video was filmed at Zuma Beach, on the coast of Malibu, California.

According to TV Squad, the show began to enlist more guest stars after the ratings success of "Ten Sessions", in which Britney Spears appeared in a cameo role. Writer Greg Malins, who had worked with James Van Der Beek, offered him a role in the episode. In March 2008, it was announced that he agreed to play Simon, Sparkles' love interest. A week later, Tiffany and Alan Thicke confirmed their roles as Sparkles' friend and father, respectively. The creators had asked Tiffany to join the show after studying her videos on YouTube. Thicke was a friend of director Pamela Fryman and had worked with her on Hope & Gloria.

The faux music video for "Sandcastles in the Sand", and the 60th episode as a whole, was directed by Fryman. It was filmed at Zuma Beach, on the coast of Malibu, California, a week and a half after its parent episode was shot at the 20th Century Fox soundstage. The crew had to hurry to complete filming before the sun set. Bays wanted the video to show Sparkles' origin story and what she was going through, from the "one time she loved so fully and gave herself over to her heart and got burned real bad by it."

The video begins with Sparkles, wearing a long white dress, walking along the beach while singing about her summer love. It then cuts to Sparkles and Simon frolicking on the beach, in one of several black-and-white flashbacks, with Sparkles wearing her jean jacket from "Let's Go to the Mall" with no sleeves. Sparkles' girlfriends appear in schoolgirl uniforms as a form of Greek chorus, lip-synching to the lyrics and jumping ropes. An animation shows a van going across a map from Alberta to Ontario; later, handwritten text reads, "It was the greatest week and a half of my life...R+S 4EVA." As the song's chorus begins, Sparkles writes the lyrics into her diary, sitting at a desk on the beach. In a chair behind her, her father smokes a pipe and reads a newspaper. He wears a sweater vest over a button-down shirt, which Eric Goldman of IGN compared to Thicke's appearance in his 1985–1992 sitcom Growing Pains. There is a sandcastle with a small Canadian flag on top, and they are surrounded by other furnishings, a grandfather clock and a spinning globe. Robin's sidekick from the "Let's Go to the Mall" video, the Omnibot 2000, arrives with flowers to cheer up Sparkles.

== Release ==
"Sandcastles in the Sand" appeared in an episode of the same name that aired on April 21, 2008. The song was fully made available for streaming on April 15 on the official website of Variety. On April 23, it was released as a digital single by 20th Century Fox Records and Fox Music. The song was later included in the compilation album How I Met Your Music (2012). The video premiered online on April 18; brief clips had been posted on MySpace three days earlier. Similar to "Let's Go to the Mall", only portions of the video were shown in its parent episode. The full four-minute footage became available on MySpace and CBS.com after its TV premiere; there was a tag at the end of the episode that encouraged viewers to watch the full video online. It was also included in the show's season 3 DVD release.

"Sandcastles in the Sand" garnered generally positive reviews from both television and music critics. Fox News called it a "worthy follow-up" to "Let's Go to the Mall". Writing in 2011, Gelman felt that it did not live up to "Let's Go to the Mall", but that the video's casting compensated for any weaknesses of the song. TVLine placed it in a tie for fourth place among the show's "Best Song and Dance Moments". Joel Keller of TV Squad said that it was "the funniest part" of a "full of eighties and nineties goodness" episode. Ryan Keefer of DVD Talk thought that the video "totally exploits Robin's Canadian heritage" and is "one of the funniest things" from the show. Mickey O'Connor of TV Guide felt that the song was "made of crack cocaine, and will be stuck in your head all day."

Fikse found that the storyline solidified Sparkle's status as a "one-hit wonder" and the video "was just as hilarious" as "Let's Go to the Mall". She commended Thicke and Van Der Beek's appearances, which show "how absurdly behind Canada was with its pop culture". Michelle Zoromski of IGN also praised their cameo performances, and cited the "splendid" song to be a highlight of the "notch up" episode. PopSugar said that the video "[has] a great, dated vibe, with a dose of Heidi Montag beach video and an amazingly awkward Dawson-related make-out scene", and compared it with Wilson Phillips' "Hold On" (1990). Writing about its online promotion, Liz Shannon Miller of Gigaom felt that it was "a great example of... understanding and incorporating" offline media through online video."

The "Sandcastles in the Sand" episode received a 3/8 Nielsen rating/share in the 18–49 demographic and attracted 8.45 million American viewers. According to Nielsen SoundScan, the song has sold 1,000 digital downloads in the United States as of August 2008. Meanwhile, its music video garnered almost 70,000 views online over the first 3 days of release. An instrumental version of "Sandcastles in the Sand" can be heard when Scherbatsky walks down the aisle in season 9's "The End of the Aisle".

== Release history ==
Region	Date	Format	Label	Ref.
Various	April 15, 2008	Streaming	20th Century Fox Records; Fox Music	
Various	April 21, 2008	TV premiere	20th Century Fox Records; Fox Music	
Various	April 23, 2008	Digital download	20th Century Fox Records; Fox Music	
