= Nothing Suits Me Like a Suit =

Single by Neil Patrick Harris and the cast of How I Met Your Mother
- Released: January 5, 2010
- Genre: Show tune
- Length: 2:50
- Label: 20th Century Fox TV Records
- Songwriters: Carter Bays, Craig Thomas
- Producer: John Swihart

"Nothing Suits Me Like a Suit" is a song performed by Neil Patrick Harris as Barney Stinson and the cast of the comedy series How I Met Your Mother from the 100th episode "Girls Versus Suits (2010)". Carter Bays and Craig Thomas were nominated for the Primetime Emmy Award for Outstanding Original Music and Lyrics for writing the song.

== Background ==
The song premiered on the 100th episode of How I Met Your Mother, "Girls Versus Suits" (season 5, episode 12) in a dream sequence where Harris' character, Barney Stinson, contemplates whether to keep his collection of suits or continue seeing the attractive bartender with whom he was about to hook up.

== Production ==
The musical number featured 65 dancers and a 50-piece orchestra and was choreographed by Zach Woodlee (Glee).

== Release ==
The episode premiered on January 11, 2010, with the single being released the following day.

=== Chart performance ===
The song peaked at #50 on the UK Singles Chart. In Canada, the song peaked at 76 on the Canadian Hot 100.

Chart	Peak position
Australian ARIA Charts	113
Canadian Hot 100	76
UK Singles Chart	50

== Accolades ==
For writing the song, series creators Carter Bays and Craig Thomas were nominated for a Primetime Emmy Award for Outstanding Original Music and Lyrics at the 62nd Primetime Emmy Awards.

== Personnel ==
- Lead vocals – Neil Patrick Harris as Barney Stinson
- Additional vocals – Jason Segel as Marshall Eriksen, Josh Radnor as Ted Mosby, Alyson Hannigan as Lily Aldrin, and Cobie Smulders as Robin Scherbatsky
