= Sandcastles in the Sand =

- How I Met Your Mother episode
- Episode no.: Season 3 Episode 16
- Directed by: Pamela Fryman
- Written by: Kourtney Kang
- Production code: 3ALH16
- Original air date: April 21, 2008

Guest appearances
- James Van Der Beek as Simon; Tiffany as Friend in music video; Alan Thicke as Dad in music video; Ryan Michelle Bathe as Michelle

Episode chronology
← Previous "The Chain of Screaming"	Next → "The Goat"
- How I Met Your Mother season 3

"Sandcastles in the Sand" is the 16th episode in the third season of the television series How I Met Your Mother and 60th overall. It originally aired on April 21, 2008.The episode is notable for revisiting Robin Scherbatsky's past as Canadian pop star Robin Sparkles and for introducing the fictional song "Sandcastles in the Sand," a parody of late 1980s and early 1990s pop ballads.

== Plot ==
The episode begins with a montage of Robin from her time as Canadian bubblegum pop star Robin Sparkles. At MacLaren's, Robin announces that her former boyfriend, Simon (James Van Der Beek), will be meeting her there later. Robin describes their break-up: after she loaded his band's equipment into their van after a performance, he dumped her for Louise Marsh.

The group agrees that every time exes reunite, there is a clear winner and a clear loser. They begin to tally the points for Robin and Simon, awarding Robin five and Simon zero. Robin agrees she will be the clear winner, unless Simon got more attractive. Simon arrives and it is clear he has not: he appears older, less stylish and physically changed from Robin's memories. Despite this, Robin is clearly still smitten with him.

After the reunion, the group retires to Marshall and Ted's apartment. They criticize Simon's personality and how Robin handled the meeting. The group learns that Robin and Simon met after he starred in the music video for her second single, "Sandcastles in the Sand", which the group was previously unaware of. Barney immediately leaves, vowing to find the video.

When Robin attempts to defend herself, the group discusses how being around someone from your past can cause you to revert to the person you were when you knew them, a phenomenon Marshall dubs "revertigo". Marshall and Ted tell Robin that Lily suffers from this; as proof, they invite Lily's high school friend Michelle to hang out with them.

At MacLaren's the next day, Robin tells the group that Simon came to her apartment the night before to reconcile, which she accepted, to the group's dismay. Michelle arrives, and she and Lily begin speaking like excitable teenagers. Michelle, a Ph.D. student in behavioral psychology, identifies this phenomenon as "associative regression".

Mirroring their original breakup, Simon again asks Robin to help load his van before abruptly leaving her for Louise Marsh. The group attempts to console Robin, but fails. She drinks alone at MacLaren's until Barney arrives, complaining that he has yet to find a copy of her video. Realizing what Robin is upset about, Barney consoles her. She invites him to watch the music video at her place. They watch the video over and over, making fun of it, and eventually begin kissing on the couch.

== Critical response ==
The A.V. Club gave the episode an A rating. IGN gave the episode a 9 out of 10 rating. Television Without Pity graded the episode A−.
