= Television criticism =

Evaluating merits of broadcast audiovisual shows

Television criticism (also called TV criticism or TV reviewing) is the act of writing or speaking about television programming to subjectively evaluate its worth, meaning, and other aspects. It is often found in newspapers, television programs, radio broadcasts, Internet and specialist periodicals and books.

While originally developed to critique content for children, it has been used to critique how various issues and topics are presented on television, including race and femininity. Relations with audiences and networks are important to critics, but problems can arise with both.

== Overview ==
Television criticism originally began as a way to analyze the shows children were watching, and to make sure they were getting quality educational content. Originally being defined as visual literacy, the term changed in the 1990s to media literacy. The purpose of television criticism is to evaluate the content of television and make a judgement about shows' messages and/or quality. Television criticism often includes interpretation and the creation of an argument to support the interpretation given. Television criticism often recommends or condemns programs in critics' writings.

Broadcast networks often provide forums for television criticism. Examples of this include The Review Show on BBC Four in the United Kingdom, which hosts a monthly discussion on the arts, often including a television series. Television criticism is also often spread via the internet and media.

Television can be criticized in a variety of ways, including quality evaluation and content interpretation.

== Perspective-based criticism ==
Viewing television from specific viewpoints can impact how it is interpreted. Authors of such perspective-based criticism may feel that such viewpoints are underrepresented in mainstream television criticism. Perspective-based television criticism focuses on viewing programs with the explicit purpose of critiquing by specifically analyzing the perspectives of female characters from a feminist perspective, or by critically analyzing representations of racial diversity from a racially diverse perspective. This may involve analysis of character portrayals, messages/purposes, and themes explored in the program. Perspective-based criticism seeks to discuss issues specific to groups within society. A prominent perspective-based television critic is Herman Grey, who has discussed racially diverse television criticism at length and categorized it at length, including assimilation and multiculturalism.

== Issues in criticism ==
Television criticism is sometimes regarded as a mode of advertising for television networks. This is because critics can be seen as authorities and their opinions can form audience opinions on programs.

Additionally, critics and networks have sometimes been in conflict over the content of shows.

== Relationship with readers ==
Most critics admit that they take in industrial factors, such as commercial viability, when reviewing a show, but also consider they may not be the target audience of the show. Critics often take into consideration audience views and balance it with their knowledge of the television industry and their own views.

== Modern television criticism ==
The rise of the internet has allowed television critics to publish their work in a cheaper manner that is easy to distribute. Multiple websites dedicated to critiquing television have sprung up over the years, with wide diversity in their writing. Some examples of this are the website Television Without Pity providing that provide "more creative and interactive commentary" and FLOW displaying a "more academic, yet still generally accessible discussion of television."

== See also ==
- Did You See...?
- Category:Television critics
