= Cobie Smulders =

Canadian actress (born 1982)

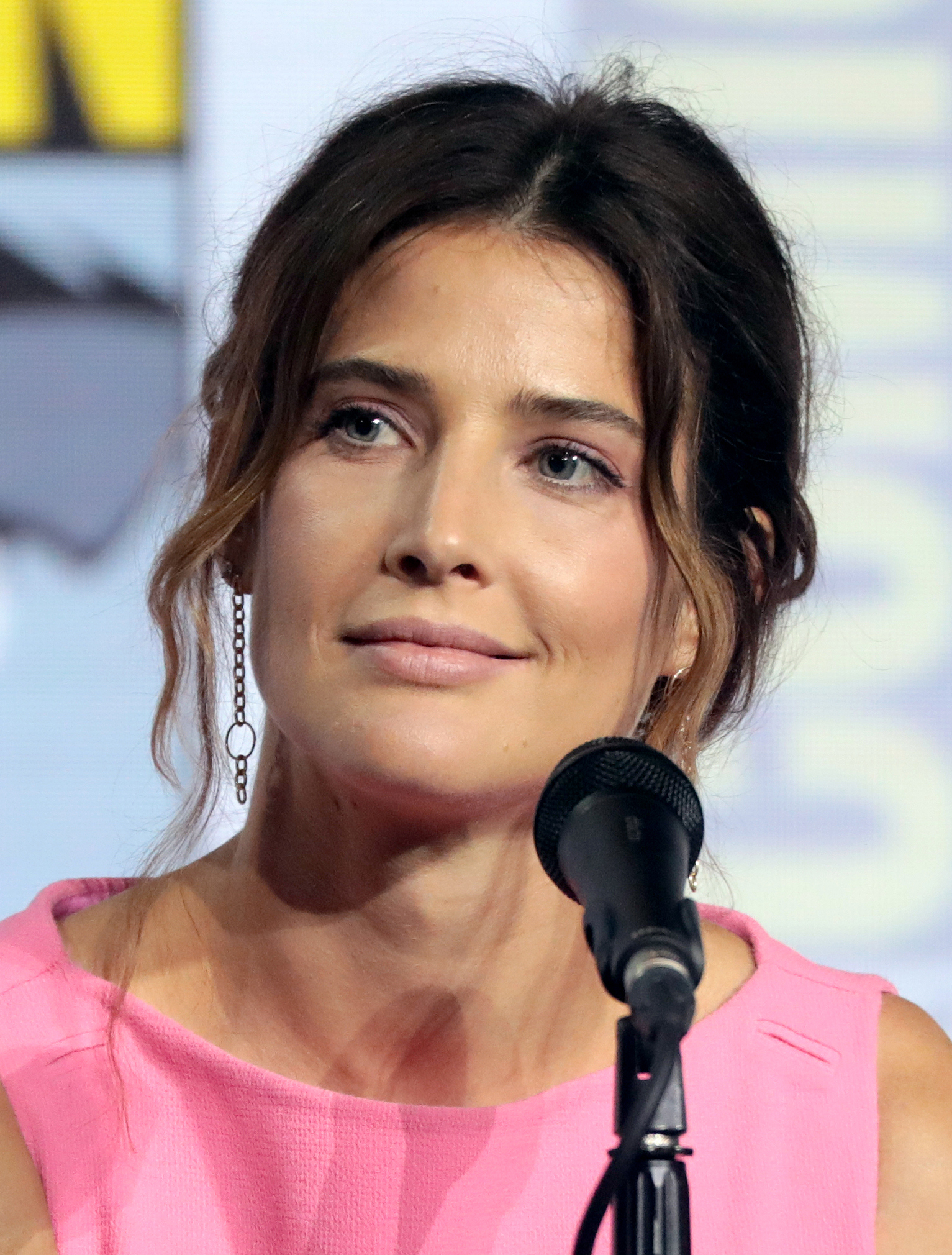
- Smulders in 2019
- Born: Jacoba Francisca Maria Smulders; April 3, 1982 (age 44); Vancouver, British Columbia, Canada
- Citizenship: Canada; United States
- Occupation: Actress
- Years active: 2002–present
- Spouse: Taran Killam (m. 2012)
- Children: 2

Jacoba Francisca Maria "Cobie" Smulders (born April 3, 1982) is a Canadian actress. She is known for her starring role as Robin Scherbatsky in the CBS series How I Met Your Mother (2005–2014) and as S.H.I.E.L.D. agent Maria Hill in the Marvel Cinematic Universe superhero franchise, starting with the film The Avengers (2012), through the television miniseries Secret Invasion (2023).

Smulders's other films include Safe Haven (2013), The Lego Movie franchise (2014–2019), Results (2015), The Intervention (2016), and Jack Reacher: Never Go Back (2016). She also starred in the Netflix comedy drama series A Series of Unfortunate Events (2017), the Netflix comedy series Friends from College (2017–2019), the ABC crime drama series Stumptown (2019–2020), and the FX true crime series Impeachment: American Crime Story (2021).

Smulders made her theater debut in the off-Broadway production of the Nora Ephron play Love, Loss, and What I Wore in 2010. She then made her Broadway debut in the revival of the Noël Coward comedy Present Laughter (2017) earning a Theater World Award.

== Early life and education ==
Smulders was born in Vancouver, British Columbia, to a Dutch father and a British mother. She was raised in White Rock, British Columbia, and later moved to the affluent West Point Grey neighbourhood to attend high school at Lord Byng Secondary School. She was named after her great-aunt, from whom she gained the nickname "Cobie". Smulders describes herself as "a fluent listener" of French. She has four sisters. Smulders was also a member of the Girl Guides of Canada as a child, participating as a Brownie (Girl Guide program for 7- to 10-year-olds). In her youth, Smulders aspired to be a marine biologist. She took an interest in theatre throughout high school and briefly studied at the University of Victoria before returning to acting.

=== Modeling ===
Smulders worked in modeling, which she later said she "kind of hated", adding that the experience made her hesitant about pursuing acting as a career: "You know, you go into these rooms, and I've had the experience of people judging you physically for so long and I was over that but, then it was like... 'Oh no, I have to actually perform. I have to do well, and I have to have a voice... and I have to have thoughts now.'"

== Career ==
=== 2002–2016: Early roles and breakthrough ===
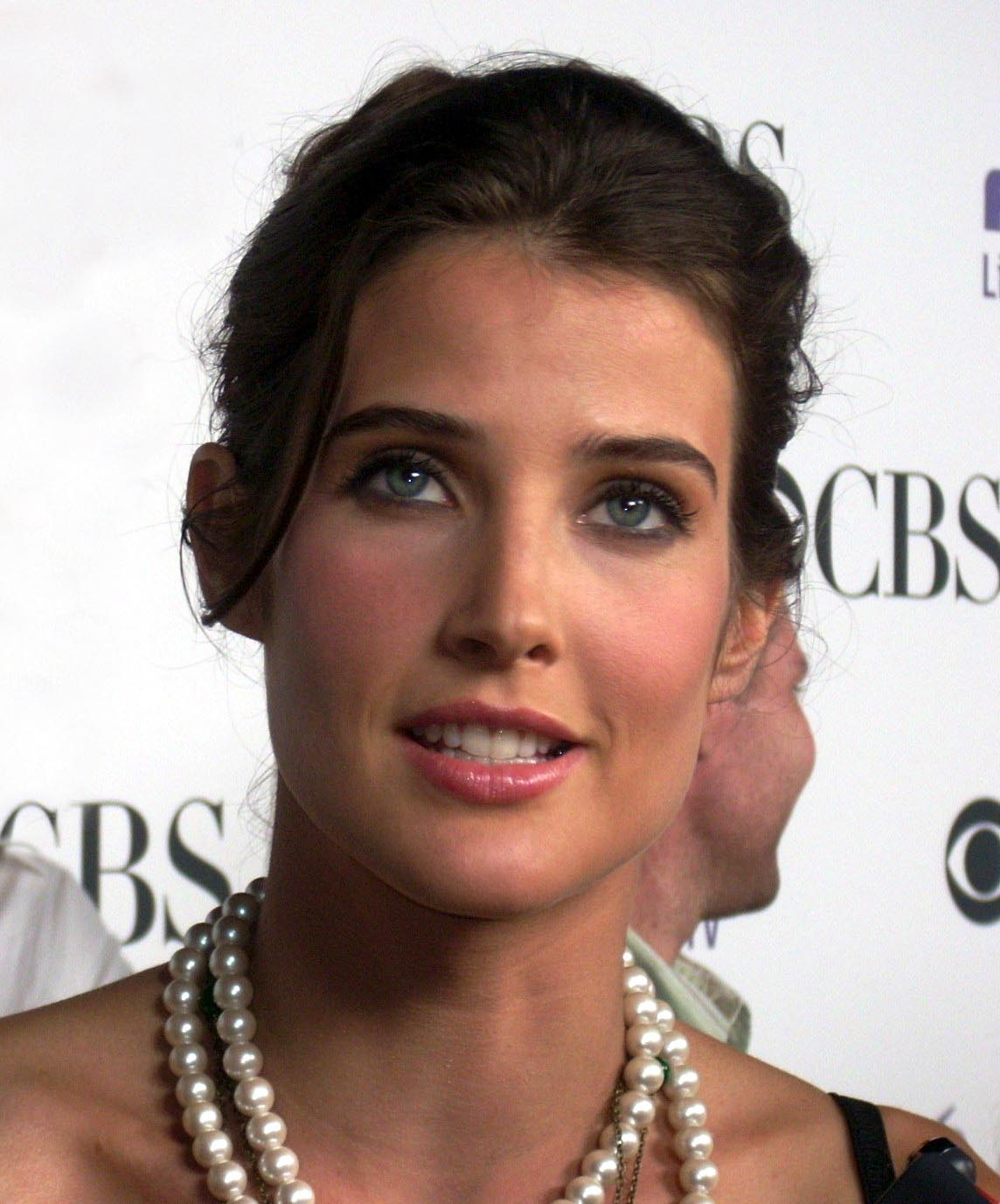
Smulders at a CBS event in 2008

Smulders made her professional acting debut in 2002, with guest appearances in the UPN science fiction comedy series Special Unit 2 and the Showtime science fiction drama series Jeremiah. She subsequently made multiple appearances on television, including in the Fox supernatural drama series Tru Calling (2003), the WB superhero series Smallville (2003), and the Global space opera series Andromeda (2005). Smulders's first role as a series regular was in the short-lived 2003 ABC adventure drama series Veritas: The Quest, which ran for one season. She made her film debut in 2004 with a supporting role in the action film Walking Tall. She then had a supporting role in the 2005 comedy film The Long Weekend. That same year, she had a recurring role as Leigh Ostin in the Showtime drama series The L Word.

In 2005, Smulders was cast as television reporter and former teen pop star Robin Scherbatsky in the CBS series How I Met Your Mother. The series concluded in 2014 after nine seasons, winning ten Emmy Awards throughout its run. For her performance, she garnered wide recognition and earned a People's Choice Award nomination. In 2009, she appeared in the comedy film The Slammin' Salmon. She then appeared in the 2010 pilot episode of the HBO comedy-drama series How to Make It in America. In June 2010, Smulders made her off-Broadway debut in Delia and Nora Ephron's play Love, Loss, and What I Wore at the Westside Theatre. She went on to star in the 2012 political comedy film Grassroots.

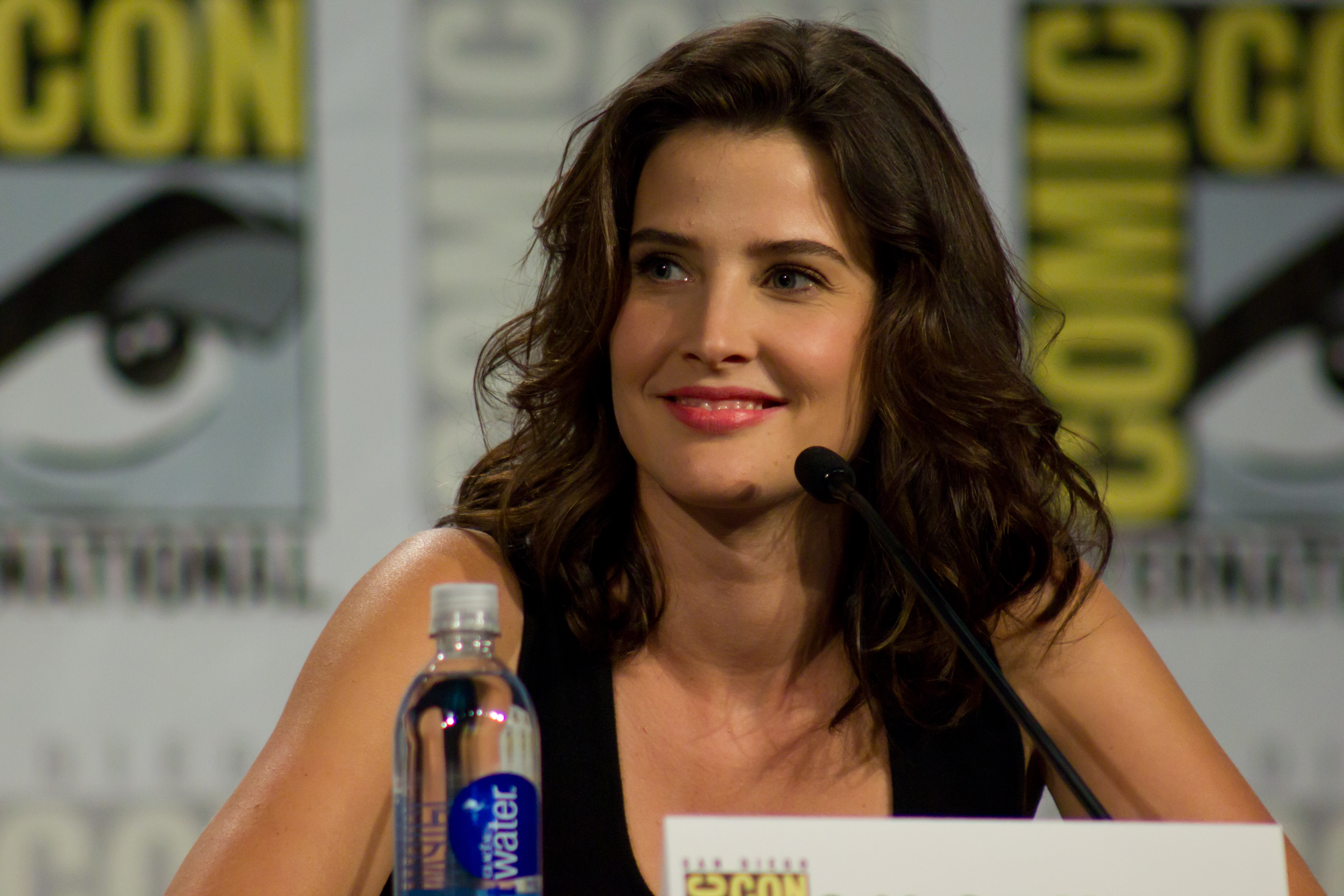
Smulders at the 2013 San Diego Comic-Con

Smulders gained further recognition for starring as S.H.I.E.L.D. agent Maria Hill in the Marvel Cinematic Universe franchise, beginning with the 2012 superhero action film The Avengers. She received training from a Los Angeles SWAT team trainer to handle guns to portray the character. Smulders reprised the role in three episodes of the ABC superhero television series Agents of S.H.I.E.L.D. (2013–2015), and in the films Captain America: The Winter Soldier (2014), Avengers: Age of Ultron (2015), Avengers: Infinity War (2018), Avengers: Endgame (2019), and Spider-Man: Far From Home (2019). In 2013, she appeared in an episode of the comedy series Comedy Bang! Bang!. Smulders also starred in the romantic drama Safe Haven (2013), the comedy-drama Delivery Man (2013) and the romantic comedy They Came Together (2014). Smulders voiced a Lego version of Wonder Woman in the 2014 animated film The Lego Movie. It was the first time the Wonder Woman character had a theatrical film appearance.

In July 2015, she was reported to have exited the television film Confirmation because she had broken her leg; Zoe Lister-Jones was then confirmed to replace her in the role of Harriet Grant. In 2015, Smulders starred in the drama film Unexpected and the romantic comedy Results. She also appeared in the documentary film Being Canadian and guest starred in the NBC variety series Best Time Ever with Neil Patrick Harris. In 2016, she appeared in the comedy-drama The Intervention starring Melanie Lynskey, Natasha Lyonne, and Alia Shawkat as well as the action adventure film Jack Reacher: Never Go Back, the latter opposite Tom Cruise. Smulders had guest voice roles in the HBO animated series Animals (2016) and the PBS Kids animated series Nature Cat (2017–2018).

=== Since 2017: Broadway debut and other roles ===
In 2017 she made her Broadway debut portraying Joanna Lyppiatt in the revival of Noël Coward's comedy Present Laughter opposite Kevin Kline. Marilyn Stasio of Variety praised Smulders in the role writing, "Smulders has a graceful, Cowardian air in the role, and makes Susan Hilferty’s costumes look even more fabulous." David Rooney of The Hollywood Reporter wrote, "Smulders looks sensational; she’s the epitome of late-’30s elegance...she carries herself with poise and assurance". For her performance she was honored with a Theatre World Award for Outstanding Broadway debut. Her performance was filmed with Great Performances and shown on PBS.

Also in 2017, she portrayed the recurring character of "Mother", also known as Mrs. Quagmire, in the Netflix black comedy drama series A Series of Unfortunate Events, based on the book series of the same name. That same year, she appeared in the comedy films Literally, Right Before Aaron and Killing Gunther. From 2017 to 2019, she starred in the Netflix comedy series Friends from College, in the main role of Lisa Turner. In 2018, she starred in the lead role of Joanne Skye in the comedy-drama film Songbird, also alternatively titled Alright Now. The film was improvised, and shot in the course of five days. She then reprised her role as Wonder Woman in the 2019 animated sequel film The Lego Movie 2: The Second Part.

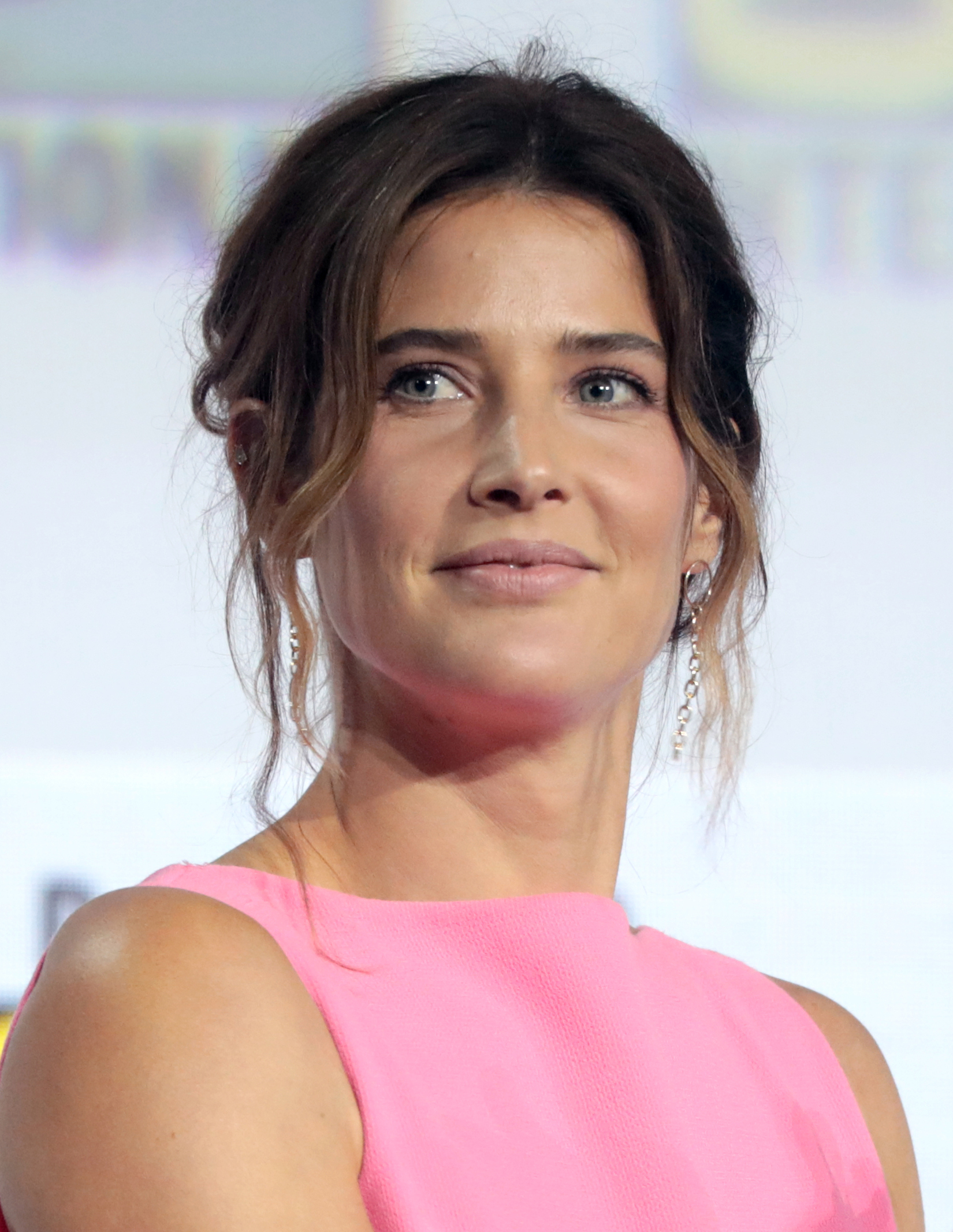
Smulders at the 2019 San Diego Comic-Con

In 2019, she guest starred as Young Lucille Bluth in three episodes of the Netflix sitcom Arrested Development and appeared in an episode of the HBO anthology series Room 104. She also starred as Dexedrine "Dex" Parios, a PTSD-stricken military veteran turned private detective, in the ABC crime drama series Stumptown, which premiered on September 25, 2019, to positive reviews. She received a Critics' Choice Super Award for Best Actress in a Superhero Series nomination for her performance. The series was cancelled after one season due to production delays caused by the COVID-19 pandemic (It had originally been renewed for a second season). In 2020, Smulders starred in the romantic drama film Cicada and voiced a guest appearance in the Fox animated sitcom The Simpsons.

In 2021, she portrayed media pundit Ann Coulter in the FX true crime anthology series Impeachment: American Crime Story, which received positive reviews from critics. That same year, she had a voice role as Maria Hill in the Disney+ animated anthology series What If...?. In 2022, she reprised her role of Robin Scherbatsky in the first season finale of the HIMYM spinoff How I Met Your Father, which aired on Hulu. Also in 2022, she starred in the Amazon Freevee coming-of-age drama series High School, based on the 2019 memoir of the same name by Tegan and Sara.

In 2023, Smulders reprised her role as Maria Hill, voicing the character in the Disney Channel animated series Moon Girl and Devil Dinosaur and appearing in the Disney+ limited series Secret Invasion.

== Personal life ==
Smulders became engaged to Taran Killam in January 2009 after meeting him at a mutual friend's party four years earlier. They married on September 8, 2012, in Solvang, California. They have two daughters. In January 2025, Smulders and Killam's home in Pacific Palisades, Los Angeles was destroyed by a wildfire.

In 2015, Smulders revealed she had been diagnosed with ovarian cancer at age 25, while shooting season three of How I Met Your Mother in 2007. She had surgery to remove two tumors from her ovaries, but the cancer had spread to her lymph nodes, resulting in the need for multiple operations over the course of two years. In August 2019, Smulders revealed she is in remission.

In 2020, Smulders announced that she had become an American citizen, while still retaining her Canadian citizenship. She stated that part of her motivation to become an American citizen was the right to vote in the 2020 presidential election.

She is a fan of the Vancouver Canucks.

=== Charity work ===
Smulders filmed a public service announcement with Oceana, an international ocean-conservation organization, in 2014. In May 2020, she released a clip parodying "Let's Go to the Mall", a song her character performed on How I Met Your Mother, titled "Let's All Stay at Home", to encourage the public to enforce COVID-19 lockdowns. Smulders also encouraged fans to donate to Save the Children, CanadaHelps and the Daily Bread Food Bank amidst the pandemic.

== Filmography ==
=== Film ===
Year	Title	Role	Notes
2004	Walking Tall	Exotic Beauty	
2005	The Long Weekend	Ellen	
2009	The Slammin' Salmon	Tara	
2012	The Avengers	Maria Hill	
2012	Grassroots	Clair	
2013	Safe Haven	Carly Jo Wheatley	
2013	Delivery Man	Emma	
2014	The Lego Movie	Wonder Woman / Diana Prince	Voice
2014	They Came Together	Tiffany Amber Thigpen	
2014	Captain America: The Winter Soldier	Maria Hill	
2015	Unexpected	Samantha Abbot	
2015	Results	Kat	
2015	Avengers: Age of Ultron	Maria Hill	
2015	Being Canadian	Herself	Documentary
2016	The Intervention	Ruby	
2016	Jack Reacher: Never Go Back	Major Susan Turner	
2017	Literally, Right Before Aaron	Allison	
2017	Killing Gunther	Lisa McCalla	
2018	Avengers: Infinity War	Maria Hill	Uncredited cameo; post-credits scene
2018	Songbird	Joanne Skye	
2019	The Lego Movie 2: The Second Part	Wonder Woman / Diana Prince	Voice
2019	Avengers: Endgame	Maria Hill	Cameo
2019	Spider-Man: Far From Home	Maria Hill	(Note: In the post-credits scene of Spider-Man: Far From Home it is revealed that Maria Hill was Soren in disguise all along during the film.)
2020	Cicada	Sophie	
2024	Sharp Corner	Rachel	
2025	Easy's Waltz	Monica	

=== Television ===
Year	Title	Role	Notes
2002	Special Unit 2	Zoe	1 episode
2002	Jeremiah	Deborah	1 episode
2003	Tru Calling	Sarah Webb	1 episode
2003	Veritas: The Quest	Juliet Droil	Main role, 13 episodes
2004	Smallville	Shannon Bell / Eve Andrews	1 episode
2005	Andromeda	Jillian Rhade	2 episodes
2005	The L Word	Leigh Ostin	4 episodes
2005–2014	How I Met Your Mother	Robin Scherbatsky	Main role, 208 episodes
2010	How to Make It in America	Hayley	1 episode
2013	Comedy Bang! Bang!	Herself	1 episode
2013–2015	Agents of S.H.I.E.L.D.	Maria Hill	3 episodes
2015	Best Time Ever with Neil Patrick Harris	Herself	1 episode
2016	Animals.	Anni	Voice role, 1 episode
2017	A Series of Unfortunate Events	Mrs. Quagmire	Recurring role, 8 episodes
2017–2018	Nature Cat	Nature Dog	Voice role, 4 episodes
2017–2019	Friends from College	Lisa Turner	Main role, 16 episodes
2019	Arrested Development	Young Lucille Bluth	3 episodes
2019	Room 104	Marian Wallace	1 episode
2019–2020	Stumptown	Dexadrine "Dex" Parios	Main role, 18 episodes; also producer
2020	The Simpsons	Hydrangea	Voice role, 1 episode
2021	Impeachment: American Crime Story	Ann Coulter	Recurring role, 5 episodes
2021–2023	What If...?	Maria Hill	Voice role, 2 episodes
2022	How I Met Your Father	Robin Scherbatsky	1 episode
2022	The Boss Baby: Back in the Crib	Stella Chimeric	Voice role, 1 episode
2022	High School	Simone Bates	Main role, 8 episodes
2023	Secret Invasion	Maria Hill	Miniseries, 1 episode
2023–2025	Moon Girl and Devil Dinosaur	Maria Hill	Voice role, 6 episodes
2024	Accused	Val Pierce	1 episode
2024–present	Shrinking	Sofi	Recurring role, 5 episodes
2025	Super Team Canada	Niagara Falls / Joan Shoop	Main role, Voice role
2025	How Not To Draw	Animator	Episode: "How Not To Draw: Perry The Platypus"
2026	The Lincoln Lawyer	Allison J. Haller	1 episode
2026	Big City Greens	Scientist	Episode:"Fitness Test"

Video game

Year	Title	Role	Notes
2016	Lego Marvel's Avengers	Maria Hill	Voice role

=== Audio drama ===
Year	Title	Role	Notes
2022–2026	Mistletoe Murders	Emily Lane	

== Theatre ==
Year	Title	Role	Notes
2010	Love, Loss, and What I Wore	Principal character	June 10, 2010 – June 26, 2010; Westside Theatre
2017	Present Laughter	Joanna Lyppiatt	April 5, 2017 – July 2, 2017; St. James Theatre

== Awards and nominations ==
Year	Award	Category	Work	Result
2013	EWwy Award	Best Supporting Actress – Comedy	How I Met Your Mother	Won
2014	People's Choice Award	Favorite TV Gal Pals (shared with Alyson Hannigan)	How I Met Your Mother	Nominated
2017	Theatre World Award		Present Laughter	Honoree
2021	Critics' Choice Super Awards	Best Actress in a Superhero Series	Stumptown	Nominated

== Notes ==
Preceded by Michelle Monaghan (2010–2011)	Voice of Wonder Woman	Succeeded by
