= Robin Scherbatsky =

Fictional character on the CBS sitcom How I Met Your Mother

- How I Met Your Mother character
- Cobie Smulders as Robin Scherbatsky
- First appearance: "Pilot" (2005)
- Last appearance: "Timing is Everything" (2022)
- Portrayed by: Cobie Smulders

In-universe information
- Full name: Robin Charles Scherbatsky Jr.
- Aliases: Robin Sparkles; Robin Daggers; Night Falcon
- Nicknames: Aunt Robin; Bus Lady; Ro-ro; Roland; RJ
- Gender: Female
- Occupation: Journalist; News anchor Canadian pop star (formerly)
- Family: Robin Charles Scherbatsky Sr. (father); Geneviève Scherbatsky (mother); Katie Scherbatsky (sister)
- Spouses: Barney Stinson (m. 2013; div. 2016) (broadcast ending) (m. 2013; div. 2016) (m. 2020) (Alternate DVD ending)
- Significant others: Ted Mosby (boyfriend; broadcast ending)
- Nationality: Canadian-American (dual citizenship)

Robin Charles Scherbatsky Jr. is a fictional character created by Carter Bays and Craig Thomas for the CBS television series How I Met Your Mother, portrayed by Cobie Smulders.

Robin is the on and off love interest of Ted Mosby (Josh Radnor) and Barney Stinson (Neil Patrick Harris), and a close friend to Lily Aldrin (Alyson Hannigan) and Marshall Eriksen (Jason Segel).

== Development ==
The creators of How I Met Your Mother, Carter Bays and Craig Thomas, always intended for Robin Scherbatsky not to be "The Mother" of Ted Mosby's children. Rather, Ted perceives Robin as the perfect woman, allowing that: "...it's still not his final love story." Bays and Thomas have said that "a pretty famous actress" turned down the role of Robin; they revealed in February 2014 that it was Jennifer Love Hewitt.

They then cast Cobie Smulders, an unknown actress at the time. Bays and Thomas later said: "Thank God we did for a million reasons... when Ted's seeing her for the first time, America's seeing her for the first time – the intriguingness of that propelled the show going forward and kept the show alive."

== Character biography ==
=== Early life ===
The character Robin Charles Scherbatsky Jr. was born on 23 July 1980 to a Canadian father, Robin Charles Scherbatsky Sr. (Ray Wise), and an English mother, Genevieve Scherbatsky (Tracey Ullman), in Vancouver, British Columbia, Canada, North America. She has a teenage sister named Katie (Lucy Hale). Robin has a difficult relationship with her father, who raised her as if she were a boy. She is a fan of the Vancouver Canucks.

Robin had a minor career as a bubblegum pop singer under the stage name of Robin Sparkles, with one hit single, "Let's Go to the Mall". After an accompanying music video, and the ensuing year-long mall tour, she developed a serious aversion to shopping malls that lasted for years. Robin followed "Let's Go to the Mall" with an "artistic follow-up" entitled "Sandcastles in the Sand", which tanked.

As her alter ego Robin Sparkles, Robin also appeared on the Canadian educational children's show Space Teens with Alan Thicke and Jessica Glitter (Nicole Scherzinger), about two teen girls traveling through space in a curling stone–shaped spaceship who "solve mysteries using math". The show was heavy with unintentional sexual innuendo, such as the song "Two Beavers Are Better Than One".

Robin attempted to shift from teen pop to grunge by adopting a new stage name, "Robin Daggers", and penning a track entitled P.S. I Love You. "P.S." is a dark, angry song about her unrequited infatuation with an unnamed person, later revealed as Paul Schaffer. In an episode parodying Alanis Morissette and her single "You Oughta Know", Robin performed the song at the 84th Grey Cup, effectively ending her career in music.

As an adult, Robin is embarrassed by her teenage stardom.

=== Life in New York City ===
After moving to New York City, Robin became a news anchor and later became a host of her own early-morning talk show.

Robin lives in the Park Slope area of Brooklyn; she meets Ted Mosby, the show's main character, and they are immediately attracted to each other. They go on a date in which Ted steals a blue French horn for her, but Ted spoils his chances with her by impulsively saying he is in love with her. They agree to remain friends, but their relationship is complicated by lingering romantic feelings.

Robin is reluctant to date Ted because he wants to get married and settle down, but they become a couple anyway at the end of season one. They break up at the end of season two, and while it is difficult at first to remain in each other's lives, Robin and Ted eventually become close, trusted friends. At the end of the fifth season, Robin moves back in to Ted's apartment after breaking up with her boyfriend Don (Benjamin Koldyke) when he decides to move to Chicago.

Although Robin was a reporter for "fluff news pieces" at the end of news segments when she first met Ted, over the course of the series, she works her way up to be lead news anchor. She briefly takes a prominent anchoring position in Japan, only to return to New York and, with help from Barney, host her own talk show.

In the seventh season, Robin discovers that she is unable to have children. Although she had always believed she did not want to have children, she is devastated by the knowledge that she no longer has the option.

Robin's romantic feelings for Barney resurface in the eighth season, when he begins dating Patrice (Ellen D. Williams), a cheerful coworker for whom she has an irrational hatred. In "The Final Page", Barney reveals that his courtship with Patrice was an elaborate ruse designed to get Robin back; he then proposes. Robin accepts.

The final season of the show depicts the 56 hours before her wedding to Barney. On her wedding day, she gets cold feet when she learns that Ted went to great lengths to find a locket she had buried years before; she takes it as a "sign from the universe" that she should be with Ted. Wanting her to be happy, Ted tells her that he no longer loves her in that way. She goes through with the wedding after Barney vows to always be honest with her.

The series finale, "Last Forever", reveals that Robin and Barney divorced after three years because Robin's busy work schedule prevented them from spending time together. Robin leaves the group upon realizing that she cannot bear to be around Barney, who has resumed his womanizing lifestyle, or Ted, who she has unresolved feelings for, and who is now happily involved with Tracy McConnell (Cristin Milioti). She and the gang drift apart over the ensuing years, but she is there for Ted and Tracy's wedding, where she finally makes her peace with Ted and Barney.

== Character discography ==
- "Let's Go to the Mall" (released under the stage name Robin Sparkles)
- "Sandcastles in the Sand" (released under the stage name Robin Sparkles)
- "The Beaver Song"
- "P.S. I Love You" (released under the stage name Robin Daggers)

== In popular culture ==
The Robin Sparkles song "Let's Go to the Mall" was included on the video game Just Dance 3.

The name Scherbatsky could be a reference to the character Kiti Shcherbatskaya in Anna Karenina, who is also humiliated by one man before finding love with another.
