= List of highest-paid American television stars =

This is a list of people starring on American television that are the highest-paid, based on verified sources for each person.

== TV and streaming salaries per episode ==
Name	Program	Role	Salary	Inflation adjusted	Year	Ref.
Jennifer Aniston	The Morning Show	Alex Levy	$4 million	$2,519,000	2019–	
Reese Witherspoon	The Morning Show	Bradley Jackson	$4 million	$2,519,000	2019–	
Charlie Sheen	Two and a Half Men	Charlie Harper	$1.8-2 million	$2,576,000	2010–11	
Ray Romano	Everybody Loves Raymond	Raymond Barone	$1.825 million	$2,802,000	2003–05	
Kelsey Grammer	Frasier	Frasier Crane	$1.6 million	$2,727,000	2002–04	
Chris Pratt	The Terminal List	James Reece	$1.4 million	$1,742,000	2022–	
Tim Allen	Home Improvement	Tim Taylor	$4 million	$2,416,000	1998–99	
Jennifer Aniston	Friends	Rachel Green	$1.1 million	$2,008,000	2003 and 2004	
Courteney Cox	Friends	Monica Geller	$1.1 million	$2,008,000	2003 and 2004	
Lisa Kudrow	Friends	Phoebe Buffay	$1.1 million	$2,008,000	2003 and 2004	
Matt LeBlanc	Friends	Joey Tribbiani	$1.1 million	$2,008,000	2003 and 2004	
David Schwimmer	Friends	Ross Geller	$1.1 million	$2,008,000	2003 and 2004	
Matthew Perry	Friends	Chandler Bing	$1.1 million	$2,008,000	2003 and 2004	
Jerry Seinfeld	Seinfeld	Jerry Seinfeld	$1 million	$1,975,000	1997–98	
Helen Hunt	Mad About You	Jamie Buchman	$1 million	$1,933,000	1998–99	
Paul Reiser	Mad About You	Paul Buchman	$1 million	$1,933,000	1998–99	
James Gandolfini	The Sopranos	Tony Soprano	$1 million	$1,553,000	2006–07	
Jennifer Aniston	Friends	Rachel Green	$1 million	$1,705,000	2002	
Courteney Cox	Friends	Monica Geller	$1 million	$1,705,000	2002	
Lisa Kudrow	Friends	Phoebe Buffay	$1 million	$1,705,000	2002	
Matt LeBlanc	Friends	Joey Tribbiani	$1 million	$1,705,000	2002	
David Schwimmer	Friends	Ross Geller	$1 million	$1,705,000	2002	
Matthew Perry	Friends	Chandler Bing	$1 million	$1,705,000	2002	
Kaley Cuoco	The Big Bang Theory	Penny	$1 million	$1,342,000	2015–17	
Johnny Galecki	The Big Bang Theory	Leonard Hofstadter	$1 million	$1,342,000	2015–17	
Jim Parsons	The Big Bang Theory	Sheldon Cooper	$1 million	$1,342,000	2015–17	
Simon Helberg	The Big Bang Theory	Howard Wolowitz	$1 million	$1,342,000	2017	
Kunal Nayyar	The Big Bang Theory	Raj Koothrappali	$1 million	$1,342,000	2017	
Nicole Kidman	Big Little Lies	Celeste Wright	$1 million	$1,259,000	2019	
Reese Witherspoon	Big Little Lies	Madeline Martha Mackenzie	$1 million	$1,259,000	2019	
Jeff Bridges	The Old Man	Dan Chase	$1 million	$1,244,000	2021–24	
Sarah Jessica Parker	And Just Like That	Carrie Bradshaw	$1 million	$1,188,000	2021–25	
Roseanne Barr	Roseanne	Roseanne Conner	$875,000	$1,796,000	1996-97	
John Goodman	Roseanne/The Conners	Dan Conner	$860,000	$1,796,000	1996-97; 2019-25	
Ashton Kutcher	Two and a Half Men	Walden Schmidt	$755,000	$1,013,000	2014	
Drew Carey	The Drew Carey Show	Drew Carey	$750,000	$1,278,000	2001–04	
David Hyde Pierce	Frasier	Niles Crane	$750,000	$1,278,000	2004	
Lauren Graham	Gilmore Girls: A Year in the Life	Lorelai Gilmore	$750,000	$1,006,000	2016	
Alexis Bledel	Gilmore Girls: A Year in the Life	Rory Gilmore	$750,000	$1,006,000	2016	
Bryan Cranston	Your Honor	Michael Desiato	$750,000	$933,000	2019–2020	
Hugh Laurie	House	Dr. Gregory House	$700,000	$982,000	2011–12	
Andrew Lincoln	The Walking Dead	Rick Grimes	$650,000	$833,000	2017–18	
Kate Winslet	Mare of Easttown	Mare Sheehan	$650,000	$809,000	2019–2020	
Jon Cryer	Two and a Half Men	Alan Harper	$620,000	$842,000	2013–15	
Julia Louis-Dreyfus	Seinfeld	Elaine Benes	$600,000	$1,185,000	1997–98	
Jason Alexander	Seinfeld	George Costanza	$600,000	$1,185,000	1997–98	
Michael Richards	Seinfeld	Cosmo Kramer	$600,000	$1,185,000	1997–98	
Eric McCormack	Will & Grace	Will Truman	$600,000	$958,000	2005–06	
Debra Messing	Will & Grace	Grace Adler	$600,000	$958,000	2005–06	
Megan Mullally	Will & Grace	Karen Walker	$600,000	$958,000	2005–06	
Sean Hayes	Will & Grace	Jack McFarland	$600,000	$958,000	2005–06	
Steve Martin	Only Murders in the Building	Charles-Haden Savage	$600,000	$746,000	2020–	
Martin Short	Only Murders in the Building	Oliver Putnam	$600,000	$746,000	2020–	
Selena Gomez	Only Murders in the Building	Mabel Mora	$600,000	$746,000	2020–	
Gillian Anderson	The First Lady	Eleanor Roosevelt	$600,000	$746,000	2021–	
Viola Davis	The First Lady	Michelle Obama	$600,000	$746,000	2021–	
Michelle Pfeiffer	The First Lady	Betty Ford	$600,000	$746,000	2021–	
Pedro Pascal	The Last of Us	Joel Miller	$600,000	$746,000	2021–	
Ellen Pompeo	Grey's Anatomy	Meredith Grey	$575,000	$724,000	2005–	
Alec Baldwin	Dr. Death	Robert Henderson	$575,000	$715,000	2020–2021	
Norman Reedus	The Walking Dead	Daryl Dixon	$550,000	$705,000	2017–18	
Julia Louis-Dreyfus	Veep	Selina Meyer	$500,000	$767,000	2019	
Julie Bowen	Modern Family	Claire Dunphy	$500,000	$630,000	2017-2020	
Ty Burrell	Modern Family	Phil Dunphy	$500,000	$630,000	2017-2020	
Jesse Tyler Ferguson	Modern Family	Mitchell Pritchett	$500,000	$630,000	2017-2020	
Ed O'Neill	Modern Family	Jay Pritchett	$500,000	$630,000	2017-2020	
Eric Stonestreet	Modern Family	Cameron Tucker	$500,000	$630,000	2017-2020	
Sofía Vergara	Modern Family	Gloria Pritchett	$500,000	$630,000	2017-2020	
James Gandolfini	The Sopranos	Tony Soprano	$400,000	$691,000	2003-2004	
Sarah Jessica Parker	Sex and the City	Carrie Bradshaw	$100,000-150,000	$209,000	2001	

== Television hosts ==
=== Network primetime salaries per season ===
Name	Program	Role	Salary	Year	Ref.
Simon Cowell	The X Factor	Judge	$75 million	2012–13	
Ariana Grande	The Voice	Coach	$25 million	2021	
Katy Perry	American Idol	Judge	$25 million	2017–18	
Jennifer Lopez	American Idol	Judge	$20 million	2011–12	
Christina Aguilera	The Voice	Coach	$20 million	2011–16	
Mariah Carey	American Idol	Judge	$18 million	2012–13	
Ryan Seacrest	American Idol	Host	$15 million	2013–16	
Britney Spears	The X Factor	Judge	$15 million	2012	
Miley Cyrus	The Voice	Coach	$13 million	2016–17	
Adam Levine	The Voice	Coach	$13 million	2016–18	
Blake Shelton	The Voice	Coach	$13 million	2016–18	
Kelly Clarkson	The Voice	Coach	$12 million	2018	
Shakira	The Voice	Coach	$12 million	2013	
Gwen Stefani	The Voice	Coach	$12 million	2017	
Nicki Minaj	American Idol	Judge	$12 million	2012–13	

=== Daytime annual salaries ===
Name	Program	Role	Salary	Year	Ref.
Ellen DeGeneres	The Ellen DeGeneres Show	Host	$50 million	2017	
Judith Sheindlin	Judge Judy	Judge	$47 million	2013	
Barbara Walters	The View	Host	$13 million	2007	
Bob Barker	The Price Is Right	Game show host	$10 million	2001	

== News presenters ==
Name	Program	Role	Salary	Year	Ref.
Matt Lauer	Today	Anchor	$21 million		
Meredith Vieira	Today	Anchor	$15 million		
Katie Couric	CBS Evening News	News anchor	$15 million		
