= Will & Grace season 8 =

Will & Grace
- Season 8
- American DVD cover
- No. of episodes: 24

Release
- Original network: NBC
- Original release: September 29, 2005 – May 18, 2006

Season chronology
- ← Previous; Season 7 Next → Season 9

The eighth season of Will & Grace premiered with a live episode on September 29, 2005, and concluded on May 18, 2006, consisting of 24 episodes. The eighth season was the final season of the series' original run; the ninth season and series revival premiered on September 28, 2017.

== Cast and characters ==
=== Main cast ===
- Eric McCormack as Will Truman
- Debra Messing as Grace Adler
- Megan Mullally as Karen Walker
- Sean Hayes as Jack McFarland
- Shelley Morrison as Rosario Salazar

=== Recurring cast ===
- Harry Connick Jr. as Dr. Marvin "Leo" Markus
- Bobby Cannavale as Vince D'Angelo
- Leslie Jordan as Beverley Leslie
- Michael Angarano as Elliot
- Leigh-Allyn Baker as Ellen
- Tom Gallop as Rob
- Tim Bagley as Larry
- Jerry Levine as Joe

=== Special guest stars ===
- Alec Baldwin as Malcolm Widmark
- Andy Richter as Dale
- Richard Chamberlain as Clyde
- Jason Biggs as Baby Glenn
- Debbie Reynolds as Bobbi Adler
- Blythe Danner as Marilyn Truman
- Steven Weber as Sam Truman
- Matt Lauer as himself
- Lily Tomlin as Margot
- Taye Diggs as James Hanson
- Daryl Hall as himself
- John Oates as himself
- Shohreh Aghdashloo as Pam
- Britney Spears as Amber-Louise
- George Takei as himself
- Wanda Sykes as Cricket
- Eileen Brennan as Zandra
- Sydney Pollack as George Truman
- Lesley Ann Warren as Tina
- Bernadette Peters as Gin
- Josh Lucas as himself
- Kevin Bacon as himself

=== Guest stars ===
- Millicent Martin as Leni
- Jim Rash as Brent
- Traci Lords as Rose
- Reed Alexander as Jordan Truman
- Jennette McCurdy as Girl in Cinema
- Robert Michael Morris as Tommy
- Shawn Christian as Travis
- Kyle Bornheimer as Waiter
- John Ducey as Jamie
- Laura Kightlinger as Nurse Sheila
- Paris Barclay as Director
- Christina Moore as Kitty
- Jere Burns as Man in Cast
- Maria Thayer as Lila

== Episodes ==
No. overall	No. in season	Title	Directed by	Written by	Original release date	Prod. code	U.S. viewers (millions)
171	1	"Alive and Schticking"	James Burrows	Bill Wrubel	September 29, 2005	8005	9.81
Grace tries to tell Tom that she doesn't want to hook up with a married man, but he continues to pursue her. After talking with Jack, Grace decides to throw caution to the wind, but when Jack realizes what he accidentally talked Grace into, he quickly talks her out of it. Jack is missing an eyebrow from a fire at the premiere of his talk show. Will tells Grace about Stan being alive, and the news quickly gets out. Malcolm asks out Karen, and Will is horrified, so to stop the date he tells Karen that Stan is alive. At first, Karen doesn't believe him, but then when Rosario admits that she's been reporting to Stan on Karen for over a year, Karen fires Rosario and goes out with Malcolm anyway, saying that Stan may not be dead, but he's dead to her.
172	2	"I Second That Emotion"	James Burrows	Gary Janetti	October 6, 2005	8001	8.44
Karen kicks out Rosario for not telling her about Stan being alive, and Will makes it his mission to emotionally heal Karen. He gets Karen to let some of her emotions out, but when all her bad memories start coming back to haunt her, she lashes out and scratches some of Will's open wounds to bring him down with her. Will and Karen end up drunk together, and decide together to put back up their emotional walls. Karen, however, decides to hang onto how hurt she's been by Stanley, while Will decides to figure out why he threw away a great boyfriend and a burgeoning career. Grace accidentally appears on Jack's talk show, and due to bad editing, it looks like she says that she hates all gay men. When gays all over New York start yelling at her and throwing things at her, she forces Jack to let her back on the show so that she can set the story straight.
173	3	"The Old Man and the Sea"	James Burrows	Greg Malins	October 13, 2005	8002	8.34
When Jack learns that Will never learned to swim, Jack insists that he teach Will how. However, Will doesn't really trust Jack, so he secretly signs up with a real instructor. When Jack finds out, he's incredibly hurt, and can't believe Will doesn't trust him with this when he trusted him with coming out of the closet. Will realizes Jack is right, and cancels his lesson with the instructor, entrusting his safety back with his friend. Karen sets up Grace on a blind date with one of Malcolm's friends. Grace is put off when she finds out the guy is a piano tuner that lives on a landfill in Staten Island, but when Karen calls Grace a snob, Grace determines to give the guy a chance. She ends up really liking the guy, but when he hears her sing, it turns out he's the snob and he ends their date early.
174	4	"Steams Like Old Times"	James Burrows	Gail Lerner	October 20, 2005	8003	7.88
After Stanley secretly talks to Jack, Jack tells Karen that he thinks she belongs with Stanley, but Karen says that she's happy with Malcolm. Jack goes to tell Stanley the bad news, but is interrupted by Malcolm who want to talk to Stanley himself. Malcolm later tells Karen that Stanley gave them his blessing to be together, and Karen, guess as hell, confronts Stanley, hurt that he would give her up without a fight. She says that there's nothing he can say to get her back, but all he has to do is say one thing and she goes running back into his arms. Will starts delivering food to the elderly homebound, and brings one older gay man, Clyde, home with him on the same night that Grace tries to celebrate the 10th anniversary of game night. Will forces Grace to play Celebrity with Clyde, who is totally useless, and Grace finally blows up at Will for ruining game night. Will admits that he worries that he's going to end up like Clyde when he's an old lonely gay man, but then Clyde tells everyone he's actually not gay, and he used to be married to a doctor but then she cheated on him so he left her. Everyone realizes that Clyde is actually Grace's future.
175	5	"The Hole Truth"	James Burrows	Sally Bradford	November 3, 2005	8004	7.93
Jack hooks up with another wanna-be celebrity gay man, Baby Glenn, whose 15 minutes involved falling down a hole and being stuck there for 3 days when he was 12 years old. Jack and Baby Glenn both go up for auction at Will's charity auction and carnival, and while Baby Glenn (Jason Biggs) actually gets bought for $1,100, no one bids on Jack. Will tries hard to pretend that Jack sold for $1,500, but Jack knows that it was Will doing the bidding. Will bucks up his old friend though, saying that it was worth every penny, and Jack really will be famous someday. Karen, who is back with Stanley, is still dating Malcolm, because she doesn't want to break his heart. When Grace lets it slip to Malcolm that Karen is back with Stanley, Karen and Malcolm break up, and Grace is left to pick up the pieces of Malcolm, agreeing to be his date to Will's carnival. When Grace can't take the freaky Malcolm anymore, Karen comes to the rescue and gets back together with Malcolm, but just as she's about to dump him again, he gets called for 2-year mission in Sri Lanka and breaks up with her.
176	6	"Love Is in the Airplane"	James Burrows	Tracy Poust & Jon Kinnally	November 10, 2005	8007	8.85
While en route to London, Will and Grace spot Grace's ex-husband Leo on their flight. Will charms a pair of gay flight attendants, and ends up working as a flight attendant himself, to smuggle Grace into first class to talk to Leo. Grace and Leo start out awkward, but end up remembering why they fell in love, and they have sex on the plane. Grace is okay with this being closure, but Leo tries to make it something more. Grace is tempted, but once they're back on the ground, she remembers why their marriage didn't work in the first place, and she bids Leo a sad goodbye. Back in New York, Jack tries to reunite Karen and Rosario, but he has to face off with Karen's new British maid who is determined not to lose her new job. Jack gets Rosario and Karen back together, but has to face off against the violent new maid to do it.
177	7	"Birds of a Feather Boa"	James Burrows	Abraham Higginbotham	November 17, 2005	8008	8.89
Jack decides to find a new apartment, and Will becomes oddly obsessed with the plight of two gay penguins at the Central Park Zoo that are going to be separated, learning more about the issue by Rose (Traci Lords), an activist who realizes in a conversation that she is actually a lesbian. Luckily, Jack realizes that Will is confusing the penguins' plight with his own, and decides not to move, donating his apartment money to the zoo so that the penguins don't have to be separated. Karen and Grace attend the funeral of Beverley Leslie's wife, Crystal, and Grace can't resist trying on a custom couture gown that used to belong to the late woman. When trying to help Grace out of the gown, Karen gets her own outfit stuck in Grace's zipper, and so they spend the ceremony stuck together with a blanket covering Grace's dress. Of course, Beverley Leslie busts them, and then gets his own outfit stuck in the zipper of the dress while trying to get Grace out of it.
178	8	"Swish Out of Water"	James Burrows	Kirk J. Rudell	November 24, 2005	8006	5.82
Grace finds it impossible to put up with her mother Bobbi's (Debbie Reynolds) constant nitpicking, so Jack takes it upon himself to help her because, according to him, no one knows how to be a good daughter better than a gay son. Jack subjects her to a barrage of Bobbi-esque insults until Grace finally learns what her mother really means underneath her harsh words. Meanwhile, Will's first case at the Coalition for Justice is about tenants' rights, and the slumlord turns out to be none other than Karen.
179	9	"A Little Christmas Queer"	James Burrows	Jamie Rhonheimer	December 8, 2005	8011	8.79
While spending the holidays at Will's mother Marilyn's (Blythe Danner) house, Grace gets cozy with Will's brother and old flame Sam (Steven Weber). Sam's adopted daughter finds a fan in Karen, who is intrigued by the little girl. Meanwhile, Jack helps Will's nephew organize and perform a Christmas show, which Marilyn is thrilled about. Will is silently fuming, however, as Marilyn is much more tolerant of the young boy than she ever was of her own son.
180	10	"Von Trapped"	James Burrows	Gail Lerner	January 5, 2006	8013	7.95
The "Sound of Music Sing-Along" has come to town and no one is more excited than Grace. She plans to, with Will, attend the musical in character by dressing up in costumes. The night turns into a disaster when she ends up babysitting a group of children and Will accidentally goes to the wrong theater, then is detained further by James (Taye Diggs), a handsome man he meets. Meanwhile, Karen and Jack try to flee when Karen gets in trouble with the theater's manager, who blocks off the exits, trapping everyone inside and forcing them to plot their escape.
181	11	"Bathroom Humor"	James Burrows	Greg Malins	January 12, 2006	8014	9.69
All of New York's high society has been invited to Karen's birthday party – but the affair goes downhill when Will, Grace and Jack embarrass themselves and wind up crammed together in Karen's bathroom with the birthday girl.
182	12	"Forbidden Fruit"	James Burrows	Janis Hirsch	January 19, 2006	8010	7.49
Grace is confused when Will adamantly insists that she turn down a job offer from his former boss Margot (Lily Tomlin), who has asked Grace to redecorate the law firm. When she takes the job after telling Will that she wouldn't, Grace learns some startling news that he has been hiding from her. Meanwhile, Jack discovers Karen's softer side when he finally sees what's inside the "forbidden room" at the Walker mansion.
183	13	"Cop to It"	James Burrows	Sally Bradford	January 26, 2006	8012	6.91
Will and Grace dread a dinner date with married friends Rob and Ellen who they assume will announce Ellen is pregnant yet again – but when the couple reveals that they are separated and loving it, Grace gets depressed. She's quickly distracted however when Will's cop ex-boyfriend, Vince (Bobby Cannavale), approaches their table as their server. Ignoring Rob and Ellen's big news, Will and Grace discuss how Vince must have gone off the deep end and quit the force after splitting with Will, and Vince's request to switch table assignments seems to confirm their thoughts. Meanwhile, Jack decides he needs to spice up "JackTalk" by helping his fan, Tommy Shields, come out of the closet. Jack and Karen set up a bowling alley meeting with Tommy when Karen is recruited to join a woman's league game as an emergency fill-in.
184	14	"I Love L. Gay"	James Burrows	Steve Gabriel	February 2, 2006	8015	7.27
Jack, Will, Karen, and a star struck Grace travel to Los Angeles to support Elliot as he is visiting colleges. Coincidentally, Will runs into James (Taye Diggs) while in LA, but to his surprise James is Canadian and in jeopardy of being deported. After spending a perfect weekend together, Will and James find that they don't have to say good-bye to each other again when Grace makes a special proposal.
185	15	"The Definition of Marriage"	James Burrows	Abraham Higginbotham	February 9, 2006	8016	7.45
The big day has finally arrived – Grace and James (Taye Diggs) are getting ready for their green card wedding. To Grace's dismay, Karen takes it upon herself to ignore her wish for a low-key wedding ceremony and decides to arrange a huge affair instead including hiring Hall & Oates to perform "Maneater" at the ceremony. However, despite Karen's plans and Grace getting sick before the vows, the wedding goes well, with James singing to Will during the ceremony. The next day, Grace discovers she's pregnant from her earlier encounter with Leo.
186	16	"Grace Expectations"	James Burrows	Janis Hirsch	March 16, 2006	8017	9.09
A nervous but optimistic Grace decides to tell Leo (Harry Connick Jr.) she is pregnant with his child, but when she finally works up enough courage to actually meet with him, she decides not to when she discovers that he's engaged. Meanwhile, Will is settling in comfortably with James (Taye Diggs) until he reveals a side of himself unknown to Will. And as Jack attempts to document every moment of Grace's pregnancy for his talk show, Karen sulks alone, jealous over the good fortunes of her friends.
187	17	"Cowboys and Iranians"	James Burrows	Robia Rashid	March 23, 2006	8009	8.82
An ecstatic Jack coerces Will into going out with him to a gay cowboy bar to meet his new boyfriend Travis (Shawn Christian). Will soon discovers that Travis is not as perfect as he seems and steps up to defend Jack's honor, which eventually leads to a bar fight. In order to show Karen the positives of multiculturalism, she hires an incompetent Iranian assistant (Shohreh Aghdashloo).
188	18	"Buy, Buy Baby"	James Burrows	Kirk J. Rudell	March 30, 2006	8018	9.38
After a large corporation takes over OutTV, Jack's talk show "JackTalk" is completely revamped. An immediate change comes when the new conservative owners hire Amber-Louise (Britney Spears) as "JackTalk"'s new co-host. While Jack is deciding whether or not he'll stand up to his new bosses, Karen goes baby shopping. After seeing Grace so happy about her pregnancy, Karen decides she wants a baby of her own and offers to pay a make-up lady, Cricket (Wanda Sykes), to carry one for her.
189	19	"Blanket Apology"	James Burrows	James Lecesne	April 6, 2006	8019	8.21
After losing his job as the host of "JackTalk," Jack vows never to return to acting. An unrelenting Karen, however, will not let Jack give up on his passion and decides to do whatever it takes to get Jack to an audition. Meanwhile, Grace accompanies Will to dinner at his parents' home, but a simple dinner soon turns into a showdown between Will and his father when his dad decides to give Grace's unborn child Will's cherished baby blanket.
190	20	"The Mourning Son"	James Burrows	Jamie Rhonheimer	April 27, 2006	8020	7.58
Friends and family gather for the funeral of Will's father. During the reception everyone shares with Will fond last memories of his father, while Will's last memory of his father is not as pleasant. As he tries to come to terms with their last fight, Marilyn (Blythe Danner) helps him realize the changes he must make in his life. Will's ex-boyfriend Vince (Bobby Cannavale) also attends the funeral service. Meanwhile, Grace attempts to comfort the grieving younger members of the family and begins to doubt her ability to be a good mother.
191	21	"Partners 'n' Crime"	James Burrows	Josh Silberman & Zack Slovinsky	May 4, 2006	8021	7.00
Will and Grace begin attending childbirth classes in preparation for the baby, but as Will and Vince (Bobby Cannavale) take another chance at their relationship together, Grace starts to doubt whether Will is up for raising a child with her. Meanwhile, Karen looks to Jack for comfort as her marriage with Stan hits a bumpy road but finds that Jack is a little preoccupied with his new television show.
192	22	"Whatever Happened to Baby Gin?"	James Burrows	Gary Janetti & Tracy Poust & Jon Kinnally	May 11, 2006	8022	9.36
Just as Will and Grace are settling into the idea of raising the baby together, Will's boyfriend Vince (Bobby Cannavale) surprises him with an announcement that will ultimately lead Will to choose between his commitment to Grace and his relationship with Vince. Meanwhile, Karen shocks everyone when she announces that she has a sister, Gin (Bernadette Peters), who was injured as a child during a game of Twister. Jack meets actor Josh Lucas, who was also up for the role Jack got on the new TV cop show "The Badge".
193	23	"The Finale"	James Burrows	David Kohan & Max Mutchnick	May 18, 2006	8023	18.43
194	24	"The Finale"	James Burrows	David Kohan & Max Mutchnick	May 18, 2006	8024	18.43
Part 1: Grace and Leo have a baby girl, and Will and Vince have a baby boy. Grace has a weird dream about the gang's future. Karen's arch-enemy Beverly Leslie makes an offer to Jack that changes his life. Part 2: Will and Grace have a falling out that lasts for years. They eventually meet up when their children meet in college (who eventually get married) and make up.

=== Special ===
Title	Directed by	Written by	Original release date	Prod. code	U.S. viewers (millions)
"Say Goodnight, Gracie"	James Burrows	David Kohan & Max Mutchnick	May 18, 2006	8025	12.91
An hour-long series retrospective that preceded the series finale, featuring interviews with the cast, crew, and guest stars.
