= Dolls and Dolls =

- Will & Grace episode
- Episode no.: Season 5 Episode 21
- Directed by: James Burrows
- Written by: Kari Lizer
- Production code: 119
- Original air date: April 24, 2003

Guest appearance
- Madonna as Liz

Episode chronology
← Previous "Leo Unwrapped"	Next → "May Divorce Be With You"
- Will & Grace season 5

"Dolls and Dolls" is the twenty-first episode of the fifth season of the American television series Will & Grace. It was written by Kari Lizer and directed by series producer James Burrows. The episode originally aired on NBC in the United States on April 24, 2003. Singer Madonna guest starred in "Dolls and Dolls".

In the episode, Karen (Megan Mullally) is prompted to meet "real people", and finds a peculiar office worker named Liz (Madonna), and becomes her roommate. Meanwhile, when Will (Eric McCormack) sprains his ankle, he develops a habit of taking too many painkillers, and his drastic personality change prompts a concerned Grace (Debra Messing) and Jack (Sean Hayes) to intervene and interfere.

"Dolls and Dolls" received mixed reviews from television critics. According to the Nielsen ratings system, the episode was watched by 17.7 million households during its original broadcast, and received a 9.3 rating/23 share among viewers in the 18–49 demographic.

== Plot ==
Following her divorce, Karen (Megan Mullally) decides that she would like to spend time with "real people" and after seeing a roommate needed ad, she decides to be someone's roommate. She visits Liz (Madonna), a peculiar office worker and the individual who put up the ad. At meeting Liz, Karen becomes intrigued and decides to be her roommate. The two go to a bar, in search for men. While there, Karen and Liz discover they both like the same man, which prompts the two to fight over him. As a result, they are no longer welcomed back to the bar. The two go home with Liz no longer wanting to be roommates with Karen. Karen tries to change Liz's mind, but to no avail. Liz tells Karen to write a check to the landlord, Walker Property Management, for her side of the rent. Unbeknownst to Liz, Karen owns the apartment building, and decides she does not want Liz as a tenant in her building.

Meanwhile, when Will (Eric McCormack) sprains his ankle, he begins taking painkillers, as prescribed by his doctor, to relieve himself from the pain. His friends, Grace (Debra Messing) and Jack (Sean Hayes), begin seeing changes in Will's personality, including him not going to work, and not reacting to a messy apartment as he is compulsively obsessed with cleanliness. One day, he notices that his pill bottle has gone missing and is searching for them, not knowing that Grace and Jack have taken it. They will not give him the bottle back as they believe he has a problem. At the end, Will admits to his problem and promises his friends he will stop taking them.

== Production ==
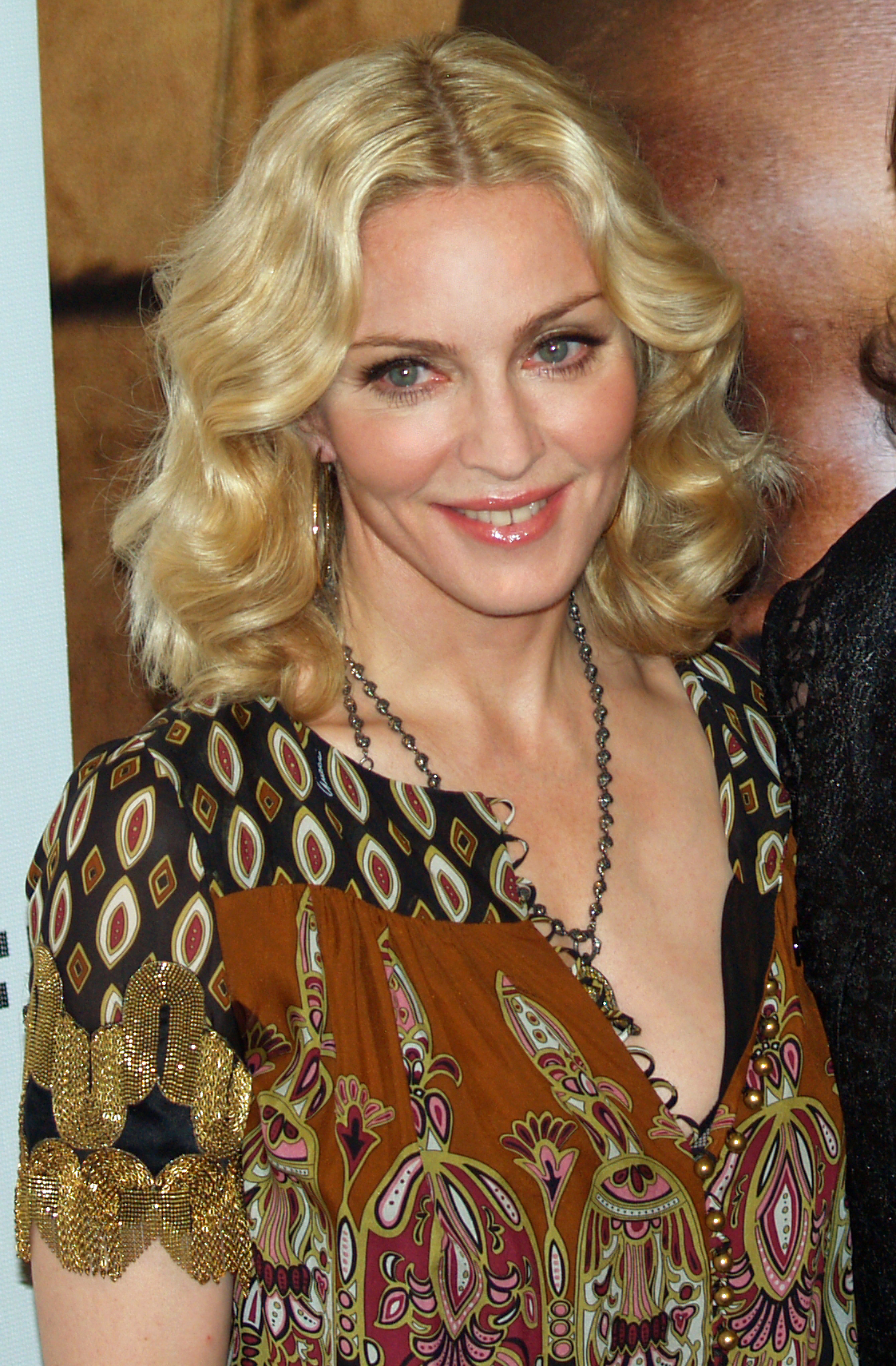
Madonna guest starred on Will & Grace at the request she get to work alongside Megan Mullally, who plays Karen on the show.

"Dolls and Dolls" was written by Kari Lizer and directed by series producer James Burrows. It originally aired on NBC in the United States on April 24, 2003. Will & Grace was one of several sitcoms to have a "super-sized" episode, which NBC employed as a sweeps stunt, and to initiate a mostly comedy lineup. Instead of the usual 30-minute episodes, "Dolls and Dolls" was increased to 40 minutes.

NBC Entertainment President Jeff Zucker announced at the annual Television Critics Association news tour in January 2003, that singer Madonna would be appearing in an episode of Will & Grace. On March 18, Madonna taped her appearance. While taping "Dolls and Dolls", Madonna recalled the first time she made her way on the set, the studio audience "cheered so hard" that she had to make her entrance all over again. "I had to wait too long to say my first line, so we had to do it over." Madonna's role in the show made it her episodic television series debut. In an interview with the entertainment news program Access Hollywood, the singer revealed that her manager gave her tapes of the show to watch. She liked the show and called it "hysterical" with "really good writing". She most enjoyed actress Megan Mullally's character Karen, and said she would do the show if her scenes were with her.

Executive producer Tim Kaiser told TV Guide that he sent Madonna arrangements of English roses with an invitation to make an appearance on the show, as he was informed that she did not own a television set, and had no idea what Will & Grace was until tapes of the show—with past guest stars—were sent to her. He noted that she agreed to do the appearance, as long as she did not have to play herself. Kaiser admitted that Madonna "had a few nerves" but was a real professional on set. In the episode, she played the character Liz, and according to Entertainment Weekly, a nod to her long-time publicist Liz Rosenberg.

It was reported that Madonna's appearance on the show was to promote her album American Life (2003). Many believed that the guest spot on the show would be good for the singer, following her appearance in the film 2002 film Swept Away, which was a box office disappointment. Her manager, however, insisted that Madonna's guest spot was not an attempt to showcase her acting abilities.

== Reception ==
According to the Nielsen ratings system, "Dolls and Dolls" was watched by 17.7 million households in its original American broadcast. The episode received a 9.3 rating/23 share among viewers in the 18–49 demographic. The episode finished in the number eighth spot tied with the April 23, 2003 episode of Fox's reality show competition American Idol. It finished in 13th place in the weekly ratings for the week of April 21–27, 2003. Following the airing of "Dolls and Dolls" a clip show of past guest stars aired, garnering 16.92 million viewers, and receiving an 8.8 rating/21 share. Since airing, "Dolls and Dolls" has received mixed reviews from television critics.

Adam Buckman of the New York Post did not enjoy Madonna's guest appearance, observing that she "proves she'll do just about anything for attention, including going on a dumb show like Will & Grace [...] Madonna did herself no favors by agreeing to participate in a cheap, desperate ratings stunt." Nonetheless, Buckman said that in the episode "she delivered her lines capably" and that her role as Liz was with "admirable gusto." Entertainment Weekly writer Ken Tucker noted that the singer's appearance was "one of the worst, if most fascinating, celebrity cameos I've ever witnessed." Tucker said that "Madonna-as-TV-actress" defeated "Madonna-as-movie-actress" primarily because "she was paired with a pro like [Megan] Mullally and had less screen time than she did in her most recent movie dud, Swept Away. According to David Kronke for the Whittier Daily News, "Madonna may have put the kibosh on her video, but not on her guest appearance as Karen's ... new best bosom buddy." While Charleston Daily Mail's Kevin McDonough reported that Madonna appearing on Will & Grace was "clearly a reprise" of singer Cher's guest stints on the episodes "Gypsies, Tramps and Weed" and "A.I.: Artificial Insemination". McDonough wrote that the cameos made by Cher "made sense", and that the latter "has an ability to laugh at herself that Madonna has never exhibited." Mark A. Perigard of the Boston Herald said Will & Grace had been "guilty of some pretty poor stunt casting" and included Madonna as a primary example. Writing for The Times publication, Lisa Verrico noted that Will & Grace was becoming the "new" Friends opining with all the guest stars in season five—Demi Moore, Minnie Driver, and Madonna—that have been featured on the show.

Before the airing, Neal Justin of the Star Tribune expected "sparks" between Madonna and Mullally's characters in this episode. A reviewer from the Sunday Independent wrote that Madonna "stretches herself to play someone with a sense of humour" in "Dolls and Dolls". The Hartford Courant's Roger Catlin wrote that despite Madonna not being successful on the big screen, "she happens to cut just the right figure" as Karen's roommate. With Catlin writing "with some sharp timing on a bunch of self-referential jokes", he asked "Is there a series in her [Madonna's] future?" Jim Keogh for the Worcester Telegram & Gazette was complimentary to the singer commenting that she was "pretty good" in "Dolls and Dolls". Jeffrey Robinson of DVD Talk was complimentary in his review of season five, writing, that the cast were involved in a lot of "fun situations" with the guest appearances from Kevin Bacon, Rip Torn, Elton John, Andy García, Madonna, Demi Moore, Macaulay Culkin, and Gene Wilder." In March 2006, Entertainment Weekly named Madonna's guest spot as their number ten most memorable guest appearance on Will & Grace.
