= Buy, Buy Baby =

- Will & Grace episode
- Episode no.: Season 8 Episode 18
- Directed by: James Burrows
- Written by: Kirk J. Rudell
- Production code: 180
- Original air date: March 30, 2006

Guest appearances
- Britney Spears as Amber-Louise; Wanda Sykes as Cricket; George Takei as himself

Episode chronology
← Previous "Cowboys and Iranians"	Next → "Blanket Apology"
- Will & Grace season 8

"Buy, Buy Baby" is the eighteenth episode of the American television series Will & Grace's eighth season. It was written by Kirk J. Rudell and directed by series producer James Burrows. The episode originally aired on NBC in the United States on March 30, 2006. Guest stars in "Buy, Buy Baby" include Britney Spears, Wanda Sykes, and George Takei.

In the episode, Jack's (Sean Hayes) talk show Jack Talk is completely revamped, after right-wing conservatives take over the gay network, OutTV. The new owners hire the ultra-conservative Amber-Louise (Spears) as Jack Talk's new co-host, infuriating Jack. While Jack is deciding whether or not he will stand up to his new bosses, Karen (Megan Mullally) desires a baby of her own. After seeing Grace (Debra Messing) so happy about her pregnancy, Karen decides she wants a baby and offers to pay a surrogate (Sykes) to carry one for her.

Before the airing of "Buy, Buy Baby", a press release from NBC revealed that the episode would include a scene in which Spears hosted a Christian cooking segment called "Cruci-fixins". The name of the segment was met with protest from Christian groups, who accused it of mocking Jesus' crucifixion. The network canceled the segment after criticism from the American Family Association. "Buy, Buy Baby" received generally mixed reviews and, according to Nielsen ratings, was watched by 3.7 million households during its original broadcast.

== Plot ==
Jack (Sean Hayes) learns that OutTV, the gay television network where he is employed, has been bought by a "large corporation" and that his talk show Jack Talk will have a co-host "to widen the audience." Not in favor of the idea, Jack agrees and meets his co-host, Amber-Louise (Britney Spears). During an episode of Jack Talk, Jack is stunned to realize that OutTV, which has been bought by right-wing conservatives, have made changes to the show, including it being renamed Talk Time USA. Not thrilled at the idea, Jack is told to compromise; Amber-Louise admits to Jack that she is a lesbian, and is merely pretending to be an ultra-conservative Christian to get by in the TV world. She asks him to go along with it, so that he can keep his job. Jack gets on board and informs his guest, actor George Takei, that the network asked that he not reveal he is gay on the show. Will tells Jack not to be let himself be pushed around, and to stand up for who he is. Jack takes Will's advice and does not compromise, which ultimately costs him his job.

Grace's (Debra Messing) pregnancy prompts Karen (Megan Mullally) to have a baby of her own. She pays a surrogate, Cricket (Wanda Sykes), to carry her child. Grace, who is bewildered at the idea of Karen having a baby, suspects that the only reason is that she is having one. Karen, however, dismisses the idea. Meanwhile, Cricket begins to have second thoughts on becoming Karen's surrogate, following Karen's strange behavior towards her and Karen's admission on how she and her husband, Stanley, will raise the child. This prompts Cricket to quit and Karen revealing to Grace that the only reason she wanted a baby was to help her marriage. She also admits that she has thought about leaving her husband.

== Production ==
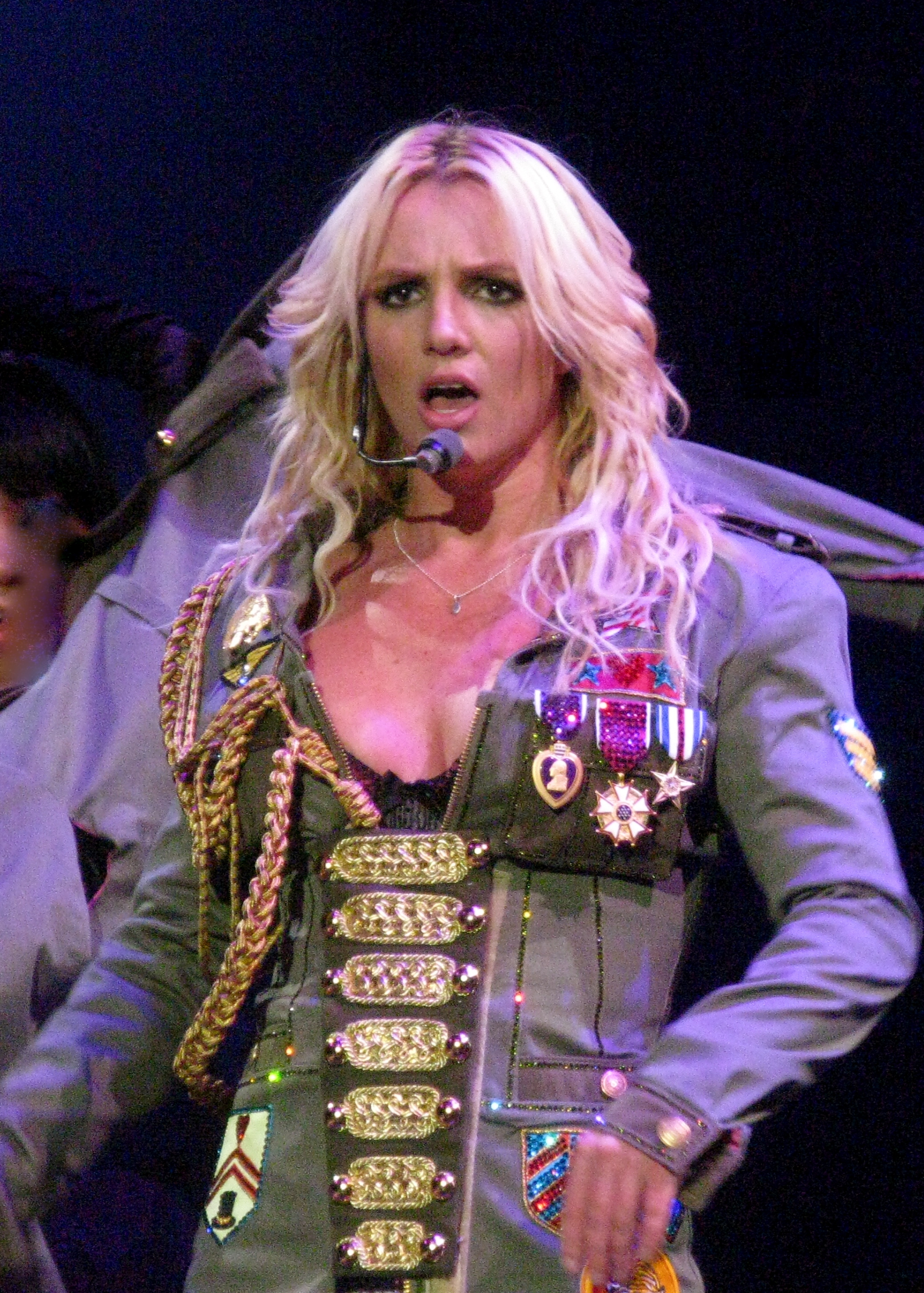
Britney Spears guest starred in the episode. Her appearance received mixed reviews from critics.

"Buy, Buy Baby" was written by Kirk J. Rudell and directed by series producer James Burrows. In February 2006, it was confirmed that singer Britney Spears would guest star on the show. She rehearsed with the cast on February 11, 2006, and recorded her lines in front of a live audience on February 13 and February 15, 2006. Spears' appearance on Will & Grace was her first acting performance on prime-time television, and her first television appearance since giving birth to a child in September 2005. The show's creators, David Kohan and Max Mutchnick, thought she did a "surprisingly good job". On March 28, 2006, the Human Rights Campaign announced that actor George Takei would also appear in the episode, in support of Gay, Lesbian, Bisexual, and Transgender (GLBT) issues since coming out as gay. In addition, actress Wanda Sykes appears as Cricket.

The episode first aired on NBC in the United States on March 30, 2006. According to a press release for "Buy, Buy Baby" released by NBC in February 2006, the episode was to air on April 13, 2006 (Maundy Thursday), the day before Good Friday and the crucifixion of Jesus. In the press release, NBC said the episode would include a scene in which Spears hosted a Christian cooking segment called "Cruci-fixins". The name of the segment was met with controversy from Christian groups, who called it a "mockery" of Jesus' crucifixion. According to the American Family Association (AFA), pressure from themselves and NBC's affiliates, caused NBC to cancel the segment and move the episode's air date. NBC, however, stated that the "Cruci-fixins" segment was "erroneous information" mistakenly included in the press release and that it was an idea for another episode that had yet to be written. An NBC spokesperson stated: "The reference to 'Cruci-fixins' will not be in the show and the storyline will not contain a Christian characterization at all. We value our viewers and sincerely regret if this misinformation has offended them." AFA responded by claiming that the network was "lying" in its claim that the segment had never been a part of the episode. A statement on AFA's website read:

In an attempt to confuse the public, the network issued an intentionally misleading statement that left the impression that AFA had lied to our supporters. When NBC said that the script 'has yet to be written,' what they didn't tell you is that the 'story board' had been completed and the offensive material was scheduled to be a part of the episode. The story board contains the outline of the program. That is the reason for the detailed description of the episode issued by NBC in their initial press release. The bottom line is that the actions taken by AFA online supporters like you caused them to rewrite the episode and remove the offensive segment.

— American Family Association (AFA) on the controversial segment,

== Reception ==
In its original American broadcast, "Buy, Buy Baby" was watched by approximately 3.7 million households, according to Nielsen ratings. The episode achieved an 11% in the key 18–49 demographics among adults. It was the eighth highest-rated show on the NBC network that week. Since airing, the episode has received mixed reviews from television critics. R. D. Heldenfels of the Akron Beacon Journal said Spears' appearance on the show was "uninspired". Lenny Ann Low of The Sydney Morning Herald commented that Spears as a right-wing co-host was a miss. "It proves she can talk and avoid the furniture but her flitting, one-dimensional character feels like a stunt." In Low's opinion, the only thing that saved the episode from a "thumbs down", was "its message about finding the courage to be yourself in a sea of conservatism, saccharine though that sounds." Maureen Ryan of the Chicago Tribune thought Spears "bombed" in the episode, and Jeff Hidek of Star-News disliked the Southern accent she used in her performance. The Plain Dealer's Mark Dawidziak commented: "Granted, the episode wasn't very well written, but Spears seemed more out of place on the show than Megan Mullally's Karen at a sensitivity seminar."

A Herald Sun reviewer, however, thought she gave the final season of Will & Grace the "send-off it deserved." Rachel Browne of The Sun-Herald said the problem with Spears' performance is that "it's impossible to accept her in any role other than her own headline-hugging self." Browne, however, thought her appearance was "fun to watch". The Sunday Mail was also positive about Spears' performance, commenting that she "does well, especially when you remember the dismal Crossroads." Trent Vanegas of Pink is the New Blog said that doing the show was a "great move" for Spears. Television researcher Tim Brooks, the co-author of the 1979 book The Complete Directory to Prime Time Network and Cable TV Shows, commented that Spears' role was a "very good way to get her chops into comedy", in part because it is "very out of type. She's not just playing herself as a celebrity."
