= 11 Years Later =

- Will & Grace episode
- Episode no.: Season 9 Episode 1
- Directed by: James Burrows
- Written by: David Kohan; Max Mutchnick
- Original air date: September 28, 2017

Guest appearances
- Kyle Bornheimer as Lenny; Eddie Matos as Congressman Steve Sandoval; Kate Micucci as Page; Anthony Ramos as Tony

Episode chronology
← Previous "The Finale"	Next → "Who's Your Daddy"
- Will & Grace season 9

"11 Years Later" is the ninth season premiere of the American sitcom Will & Grace, and the 195th episode overall. It was first broadcast on September 28, 2017, on NBC, and was watched by 10.2 million people during its original broadcast. It was written by David Kohan and Max Mutchnick, and directed by James Burrows. Airing over 11 years after the original series finale, the episode's intro scene effectively retcons many of the events of the finale out of existence as a daydream Karen experiences.

== Plot ==
At Will's apartment, Karen awakens from a dream in which Will and Grace married their partners, and had children who married each other. Will and Grace explain that they have no children, that they are both separated from their partners, and that Grace is staying at Will's apartment temporarily while she finalizes her divorce.

Will writes an angry letter to Steve Sandoval, a congressman gutting the Environmental Protection Agency, but to whom Will is also secretly attracted. Jack uses his connections to get himself and Will invited to an event held by Sandoval at the White House Rose Garden. Will and Sandoval meet; they flirt with each other, and Sandoval instructs a page to take Will on a tour of the West Wing.

Meanwhile, Karen uses her friendship with Melania Trump to get Grace's interior design studio hired to redecorate the Oval Office. Though Grace opposes Trump politically, she accepts the high-paying job. She travels to the White House, where she encounters Will at Sandoval's event. Their hypocritical motivations for being in Washington are exposed, and they have an argument that devolves into a pillow fight in the Oval Office.

Back in New York, Grace decides to move out of Will's apartment. Will convinces her to stay, and they reconcile with the agreement that they will keep politics out of their relationship. Karen admonishes Grace for rejecting the opportunity to decorate the Oval Office, but Grace responds that she made one change: a "Make America Gay Again" hat left on top of the President's chair.

== Ratings and reception ==
"11 Years Later" was watched by 10.2 million people during its original broadcast, and gained a 3.0 ratings share among adults aged 18–49.

Kendall Williams of Den of Geek gave the episode a 3 out of 5, saying, "The episode doesn't venture from its usual shenanigans and social commentary about people and causes that matter. It's no mistake that the season premiere refers to the current occupant in The White House, and then temporarily relocates the main characters to D.C. to act out their personal and political prejudices." She also mentioned that "some of the intended jokes and jabs didn't hit their mark with me", despite enjoying the chemistry between the leading actors. However, she still gave some positive thoughts about the episode, saying "Nothing significant has changed on the show, which is a good thing. Viewers would be disoriented if presented with unrealistic scenarios that might come across as forced or angry in order for the writers to prove a point." Justin Kirkland from Entertainment Weekly gave the episode an A−. He particularly praised the political message of the episode, saying, "Will & Grace is the best political vehicle when it's being absolutely ridiculous, which is why it doesn't take long to come back together." He also enjoyed the characters' dynamics and relationships, especially between Will and Grace. He also acknowledged that the episode alone was not capable of solving the "whole last season" and its ending. However, he completed this point by saying, "If Will and Grace proved two things, it's that we have bigger fish to fry, and that sometimes the best way to fight the fight is with something familiar."

Jonathan Bernstein from The Daily Telegraph gave the episode a 2 out of 5, with a mixed to negative review. He said, "If you're an American comedy in 2017 with ambitions to take on the current administration, you're automatically at the tail-end of a very, very long and angry queue. You should spend your time sharpening your claws and your teeth for the kill. In this episode, Will & Grace did the exact opposite." He felt that the main plot of the premiere was contrived, and "entirely bereft of depth or character development." However, he noticed the attempts of the episode to appear relevant, despite being "a broad, blowsy old-fashioned show." Finally, he mentioned that he would give another chance to the season, as the premiere does not "immediately doom the entire comeback." Vulture's Brian Moylan gave the episode a 3 out of 5, with a mixed review, saying, "From stem to stern, this episode is like one long exhale for the pent-up liberals who have been glued to outrage Twitter and mainlining Rachel Maddow since the election." He also acknowledged that the episode "isn't long enough to contain everything", especially the introduction of Tony, and was saddened that the political message ended up being personal. He concluded his review by saying, "Although it's like going back in a time machine, it's a past I certainly won't mind visiting for the next few months — or at least until Trump gets impeached."
