= Alive and Schticking =

- Will & Grace episode
- Scene where Malcolm (Alec Baldwin) is afraid of being caught talking to Will (Eric McCormack); so when Rosario (Shelley Morrison) and Karen (Megan Mullally) arrive he pretends to be Will's boyfriend and kiss him.
- Episode no.: Season 8 Episode 1
- Directed by: James Burrows
- Written by: Bill Wrubel
- Production code: 163
- Original air date: September 29, 2005

Guest appearance
- Alec Baldwin as Malcolm

Episode chronology
← Previous "Kiss and Tell"	Next → "I Second That Emotion"
- Will & Grace season 8

"Alive and Schticking" is the season premiere of the American television series Will & Grace's eighth season. It was written by Bill Wrubel and directed by series producer James Burrows. The episode was broadcast live on NBC in the United States on September 29, 2005, and was performed twice by the actors that evening for the East and West coasts. Alec Baldwin guest starred in "Alive and Schticking" and received an Emmy Award nomination for his performance.

In the episode, Grace (Debra Messing) contemplates having an affair with a married man, while Jack (Sean Hayes) begins a new career as the host of his new talk show Jack Talk. Meanwhile, Will (Eric McCormack) tries to hide from Karen (Megan Mullally) the fact that her husband, Stan, is alive and faked his death due to troubles with the mob. Will also tries to stop his former boss, Malcolm (Baldwin), from dating Karen.

Will & Grace creators and executive producers David Kohan and Max Mutchnick were in favor of doing a live episode, and Kevin Reilly, who at the time served as NBC Entertainment President, thought it would be a good way to inaugurate the (at the time) final season of the show. Since airing, "Alive and Schticking" has received mostly positive reviews from television critics, who enjoyed watching the mistakes made by the actors and their attempts to hide their laughter during the live broadcast. The episode acquired a Nielsen rating of 9.81 and garnered the series' highest rating in the 18–49 demographic since February 17, 2005, and biggest overall viewer total since February 24, 2005.

== Plot ==
Will (Eric McCormack) reveals to Grace (Debra Messing) that Karen's (Megan Mullally) husband Stan is still alive. He learned this from his former boss, Malcolm (Alec Baldwin), a secret agent, who told him that Stan is now living under seclusion and faked his death because of troubles with the mob. Will makes Grace promise that she keep this information to herself, but she breaks the promise and tells Jack (Sean Hayes). When Malcolm later visits Will at his apartment and warns him not to tell people about Stan's predicament, Karen and Rosario (Shelley Morrison) also arrive. At meeting Karen, Malcolm becomes fond of her, as does Karen of him, even asking him out on a date, to which he accepts. Will, however, tells Malcolm that he cannot date Karen because Malcolm is still protecting Stan from the mob.

Meanwhile, Grace and Jack are discussing their own problems. Grace uses Jack's promiscuous history with married men as a legitimate reason to have an affair with a married man, but Jack tells her to forget about it as both of them are the moral role models to their friends. After being honest with her, Jack confesses that the reason he is wearing an eye patch is not because he got glitter in his eye, as he told his friends. When he refused to stop his singing performance during the debut of his new talk show, Jack Talk, even though the entire set had accidentally been set on fire, his eyebrow was burnt off. Later, Will, Grace, and Jack all decide that it would be for the best to let Karen know the truth about Stan. Will breaks the news to her, but Karen believes he is joking. Rosario tells Karen that Stan is not dead, as she has been giving him reports on Karen. At the admission, Karen fires Rosario and leaves Will's apartment with Malcolm, explaining that Stan may be alive, but that he is still dead to her.

== Production ==
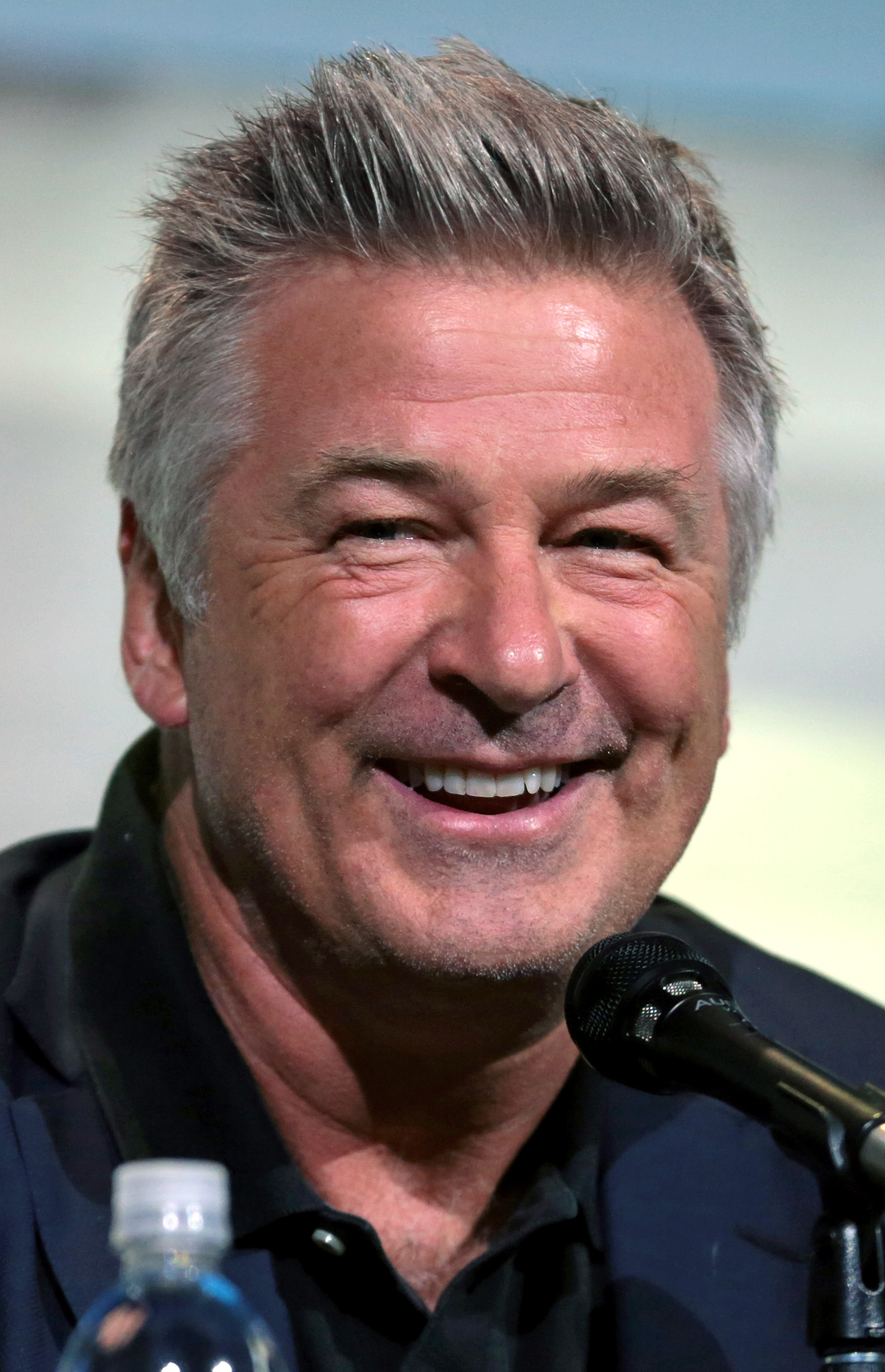
Alec Baldwin guest starred on Will & Grace at the request he get to work alongside Megan Mullally, who plays Karen on the show.

"Alive and Schticking" was written by Bill Wrubel and directed by series producer James Burrows. In July 2005, it was announced by the National Broadcasting Company (NBC) that Will & Grace's season premiere for season eight would be performed live. It was also confirmed that actor Alec Baldwin would appear in the episode. This was Baldwin's third appearance, as he guest starred in two episodes from season seven, playing Will's boss. His initial decision to do the show was to work with Megan Mullally, who plays Karen; "I just love Megan. And so I said, 'Well, if you let me do it with Megan.' And they said 'You got it.' So I went and did that with them for four [episodes]. It was fun. For me now, it's about who I work with."

Will & Grace creators and executive producers David Kohan and Max Mutchnick were in favor of doing a live episode; "We love the idea of a live episode because we get to show the audience of Will & Grace what we've known from day one — we work with the best cast in network television," said Mutchnick. He noted that the live element would allow the writers to make changes in the script right up until the airing of the episode. Kevin Reilly, who at the time served as NBC Entertainment President, said the "challenging live platform launch" for Will & Grace would be a good way for the show to inaugurate its final season. In discussion of the episode, Burrows, the director of all Will & Grace episodes, commented: "This will be like the classic golden era of television that I was weaned on, where the audience sees everything. Directing a live broadcast will be a first for me, and as long as I have been in the business, there are very few firsts."

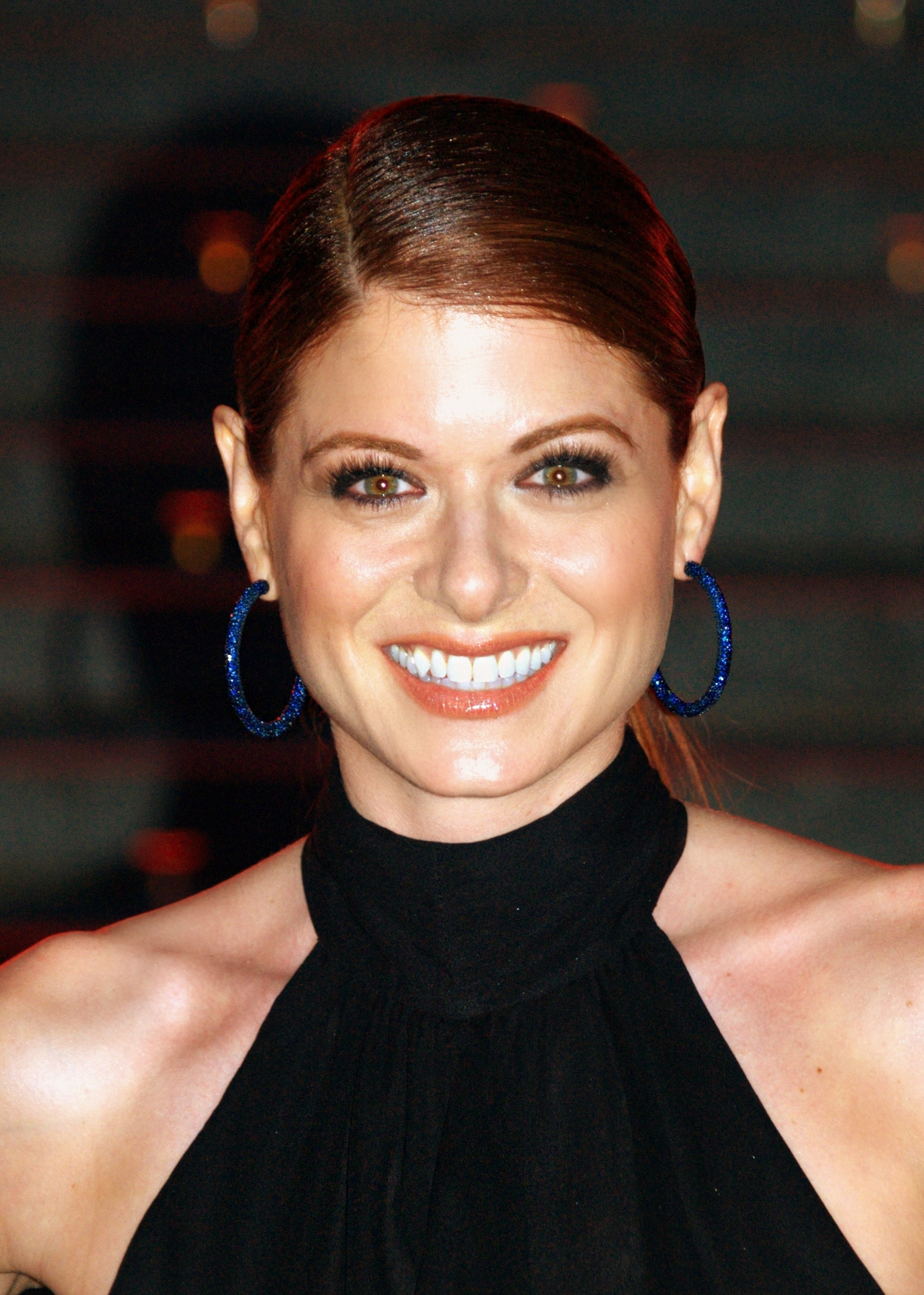
Debra Messing, in regards to the episode, said that the live premiere started the show's final season in a special way.

Upon learning about the live telecast, the cast had mixed emotions. Sean Hayes, who plays Jack, was nervous about the episode and hoped there would be cue cards. Debra Messing (Grace) "gasped loudly" when it was revealed that the technical demands of live television would mean that Burrows would not be directing on the stage floor, but would be up in a booth instead. Messing noted that she had never done live television, but in regards to the live broadcast, said, "It starts out our final season in a real special way." Eric McCormack (Will) was intrigued about the idea and seemed to be ready for whatever happened; "It keeps it interesting for us. It stirs it up. It gives us a new way to do it."

Mullally revealed that the show's writing team was "notorious for tinkering with the script's laugh lines", even during the actual taping of the episodes. She hoped they would resist that urge for the live episode. Messing, however, was sure that the writers would interfere during the broadcasts; "I have a gut feeling that, like, 10 minutes before we go they'll be like, 'Oh, no, no, you know what? Change this line to this. Now we're locked – go.'" Prior to the live episode, the cast had shot the second, third and fourth episodes of the season. Shortly before this episode, Mullally injured her foot and was unable to walk without crutches. The writers therefore had to put Mullally's character, Karen, in a cast and a motorized scooter, ostensibly because the character was recovering from an operation to correct a webbed toe.

"Alive and Schticking" was performed live twice for viewers in the East and West coasts, with different jokes for each broadcast. The first show was broadcast at 8:30 p.m. (ET) for the East (this feed also aired live at 7:30 p.m. in the Central Time Zone) and the second three hours later at 11:30 p.m. ET (8:30pm PT) for the West. During the two performances, Messing and Hayes had "attacks of the giggles". An audience member who was in attendance commented that Messing and Hayes "were so bad at keeping a straight face" during a dress rehearsal that Burrows had to get on the show's PA system to yell at them. After both telecasts were aired, Burrows revealed that McCormack, Messing, Hayes, Mullally, and Baldwin "had a ball, but they also dreaded it."

== Reception ==
In its original American broadcast, "Alive and Schticking" was watched by 9.81 million households, according to Nielsen ratings. The episode received a 4.4 rating/11 share among viewers in the 18–49 demographic. It also scored the series' highest 18–49 rating since February 17, 2005, and biggest overall viewer total since February 24, 2005. "Alive and Schticking" finished 21st in the weekly ratings for the week of September 26–October 2, 2005. In 2006, Baldwin was nominated for a Primetime Emmy Award in the "Outstanding Guest Actor in a Comedy Series" category for this episode.

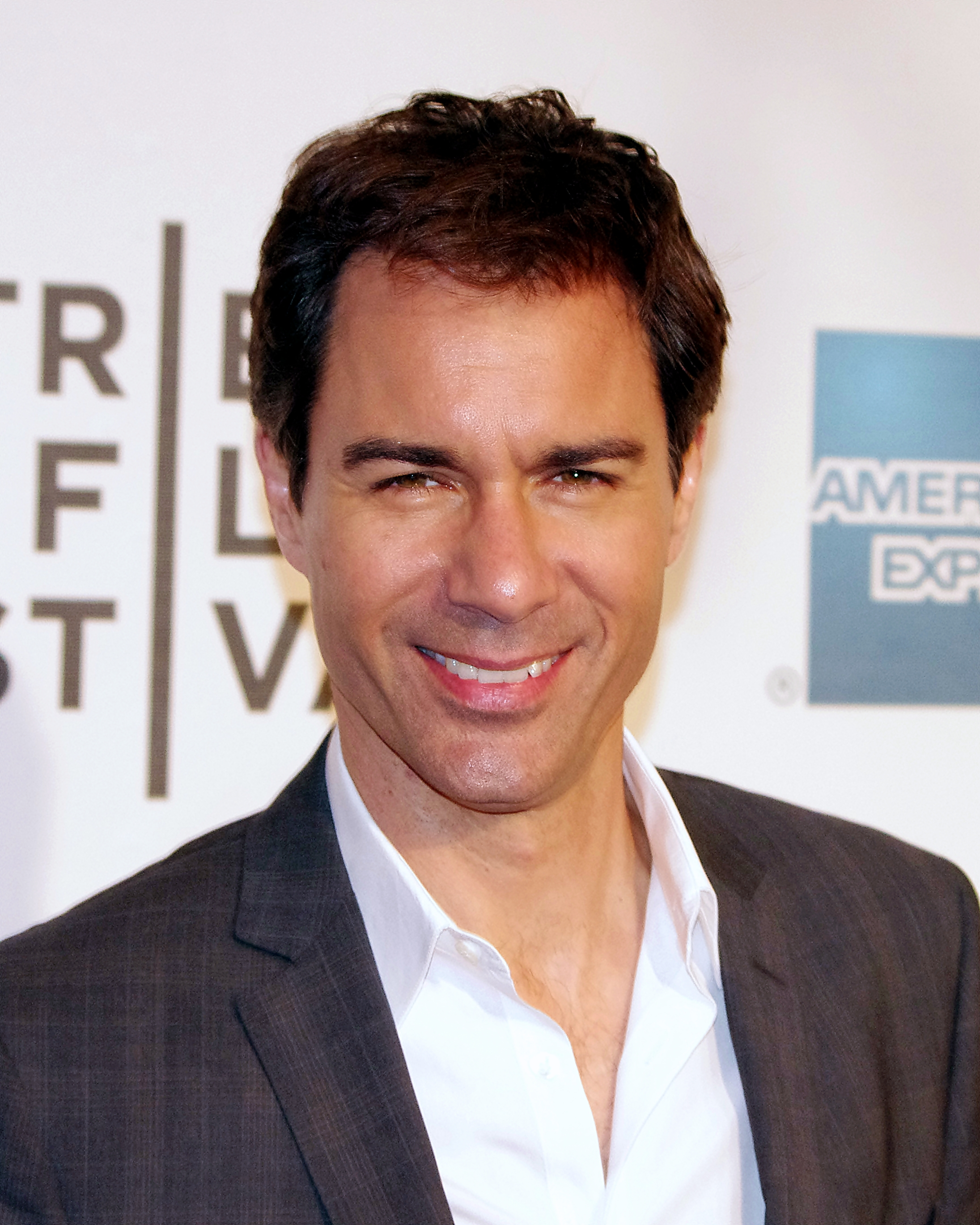
Dana Stevens of Slate magazine wrote that Eric McCormack "never lost his cool throughout the episode; he was the most professional".

"Alive and Schticking" received positive reviews. Fort Worth Star-Telegram contributor Robert Philpot, who gave the episode a B+ rating, thought it was a pleasant surprise and an indication that there "might be some life" left in the show. He added that the episode feels fresher because of the "rapid-fire dialogue, farcical situations and ubiquitous double-entendres. And although this live edition was inarguably a stunt, it did prove that real people — and not mere machines — laugh at the characters and the jokes." Sal Cinquemani of Slant Magazine also noted that the episode showed that Will & Grace still had a bit of life left. He added that McCormack seemed to flourish under the pressure, and that Hayes and Mullally "were given free rein to flex their Jack and Karen [...]". Dana Stevens of Slate magazine reported that "Alive and Schticking" offered a chance to punch up the show with some "unusually broad sight gags." She wrote that the real reason to watch the episode were the mistakes made by the actors.

Philpot continued that moments like Will and his boss making out recalled the show's "glory days", and Messing's trouble keeping a straight face "brought back fond memories of Tim Conway cracking up Harvey Korman on The Carol Burnett Show." Knoxville News Sentinel's writer Terry Morrow also commented that the episode reminded him of The Carol Burnett Show because of its "goofiness and by-the-seat-of-its-pants style." Morrow added that the episode made him laugh more than any other sitcom on network television. Jeffrey Kauffman of DVD Talk praised Baldwin for his performance and commented that "Alive and Schticking" helped "jumpstart the series creatively after a couple of seasons" and "It's fun [...] to see the actors momentarily break character, a la The Carol Burnett Show, where the absurdity of certain situations (usually involving Jack and/or Karen) makes giggling all but impossible." Entertainment Weekly television critic Gary Susman gave "Alive and Schticking" four stars, while Frazier Moore of the Associated Press lauded it as a "fun, and attention-grabbing, note." The Hollywood Reporter's Ray Richmond said "In hindsight, this live thing proved a good idea."

"Alive and Schticking" received less positive reviews as well. Gail Pennington of the St. Louis Post-Dispatch wrote that the live episode "proved once and for all that Will & Grace should have been buried before now," and Jeffrey Robinson of DVD Talk pointed out that its underlying storyline "is a little too over-the-top." Jessica Banov of The Fayetteville Observer wrote, "The first live show ... was so-so. The lighting was weird, and I'm not sure what was up with Debra Messing's hair. But it was funny to see Messing and Sean Hayes break from their scripts to giggle." Cinquemani commented that Baldwin's "absurd" role as Malcolm "is proving to be one of Will & Grace's most enduring guest stars." David Blum of The New York Sun reported that the producers of Will & Grace wasted Baldwin's "prodigious talents on a supporting role this past season, when it's clear he could effortlessly carry his own network series." Kauffman concluded that Grace's joke about George Bush being brain dead "just falls amazingly flat".
