= The Finale (Will & Grace) =

- Will & Grace episodes
- Promotional poster for "The Finale", showing the main cast bowing.
- Episode nos.: Season 8 Episodes 23 & 24
- Directed by: James Burrows
- Written by: David Kohan; Max Mutchnick
- Original air date: May 18, 2006

Guest appearances
- Kevin Bacon as himself; Harry Connick Jr. as Leo; Leslie Jordan as Beverley Leslie; Bobby Cannavale as Vince

Episode chronology
← Previous "Whatever Happened to Baby Gin?"	Next → "11 Years Later"
- Will & Grace season 8

"The Finale" is the two-part season finale of the eighth season of the American television series Will & Grace. The episode is the 23rd and the 24th episode of the season, and the 193rd and the 194th episode overall, and originally served as the series finale prior to the announcement of a 16-episode ninth season revival slated for the 2017–18 TV season. It originally aired on NBC in the United States on May 18, 2006, when it was watched by an average of eighteen million viewers, making it the most watched episode of the final two seasons of Will & Grace. In the finale, Will and Grace have a falling-out that lasts for years. They each have a child with their respective partners, and eventually reconcile when their children (Laila and Ben) meet at college. Meanwhile, Karen's arch-enemy Beverley Leslie makes an offer to Jack which ultimately leads to Jack inheriting Beverley's fortune.

The episode was written by series creators and executive producers David Kohan and Max Mutchnick and directed by James Burrows. Filming took place at CBS Studio Center in Studio City, California in April 2006. The cast members took the news about the show ending well, but they became emotional as the final scene was being filmed. NBC heavily promoted the finale, and the main cast members appeared on The Oprah Winfrey Show and The Today Show to bid farewell. An hour-long series retrospective, "Say Goodnight Gracie", featuring interviews with the cast, crew, and guest stars, preceded the hour-long series finale.

Since airing, "The Finale" has received mixed reviews from television critics. Within the series continuity, when Will & Grace began its ninth season 11 years after this episode aired, most of the events of "The Finale" were retconned out of existence. Although Grace and Leo did remarry, neither Grace nor Will ever had children, Karen did not divorce Stan, and Jack never married Beverley Leslie; the entire episode was said to have been a drunken daydream of Karen's. Since Grace was pregnant for most of season 8, and her pregnancy affected the storylines of the entire season, it is presumed that she lost the baby and did not conceive again while remarried to Leo. However, this is never addressed in the revival series.

== Plot ==
Grace Adler (Debra Messing), heavily pregnant, is having bizarre dreams of the future in which she and her gay friend and roommate Will Truman (Eric McCormack) are an old couple raising their child. In her dream, Jack McFarland (Sean Hayes) is married to actor Kevin Bacon, and Karen Walker (Megan Mullally)—who has not aged (her explanation: "Money")—is now in a relationship with her maid Rosario Salazar (Shelley Morrison). In Grace's real life, however, her relationship with Will is complicated. Grace is not sure if she wants to spend the rest of her life living with Will. When her ex-husband Marvin "Leo" Markus (Harry Connick Jr.) shows up and proposes to her—unaware she is pregnant with his child—she immediately accepts. Will feels betrayed and stops speaking to her.

Two years later, Grace moves with Leo to Rome and lives there for a year. They then move back to New York City, where they raise their daughter, Laila. Will and Vince D'Angelo (Bobby Cannavale) have since reconciled, and are raising a son, Ben. Karen and Jack grow tired of the fact that Will and Grace are not speaking with each other, so they lure them to the same place and force them to make up. The four meet at Will and Vince's apartment, and even though Will and Grace have a pleasant evening together, they find that too much has changed between them, and drift apart.

Meanwhile, Karen finalizes her divorce from Stan, but soon finds out that all his money was borrowed and that she will be left with nothing. When learning that Beverley Leslie (Leslie Jordan) and his "business associate" Benji (Brian A. Setzer) have broken up, Karen plots to have Jack take Benji's place, after Jack confesses that Beverley offered to share his entire fortune with him. Though he is not attracted to Beverley, Jack goes ahead with the scheme because Karen had financially supported him for the whole of their relationship. Karen realizes that she is doing to Jack what her mother did to her and tells him that she cares more about his happiness than the money. When Beverley dies after being blown off a balcony from high winds, Jack inherits all of his money.

Around twenty years later, Laila meets Ben as they both move into college. Will and Grace are reunited while helping their children move into their dorm rooms and rekindle their friendship. Laila and Ben eventually marry. Jack and Karen, meanwhile, are now living comfortably with each other and Rosario. While everyone else is older, Karen—just like in Grace's dream—has not aged due to extensive plastic surgery, and she and Jack perform a duet of the song "Unforgettable". The show ends with Will and Grace watching ER together, reminiscing and discussing the marriage of their respective children. Feeling uplifted, the four friends gather at a bar to toast to their friendship, which then flashes back to the four as their younger selves.

== Production ==
Will & Grace creators and executive producers David Kohan and Max Mutchnick, who had not served as writers since the season four season finale, wrote the script for the series finale. Regarding the finale, Mutchnick stated: "We wrote about what you want to have happen with people you love. I think Will and Grace end up very fleshed out. They end up as full adults. All the things that matter in life, they end up having." Three years before the series finale was created, Mutchnick was asked on his opinion regarding how he would like to see the character's story come to a conclusion, "The truth is that [Will and Grace] serve each other's dysfunction. And the best way for their story to end is to find love."

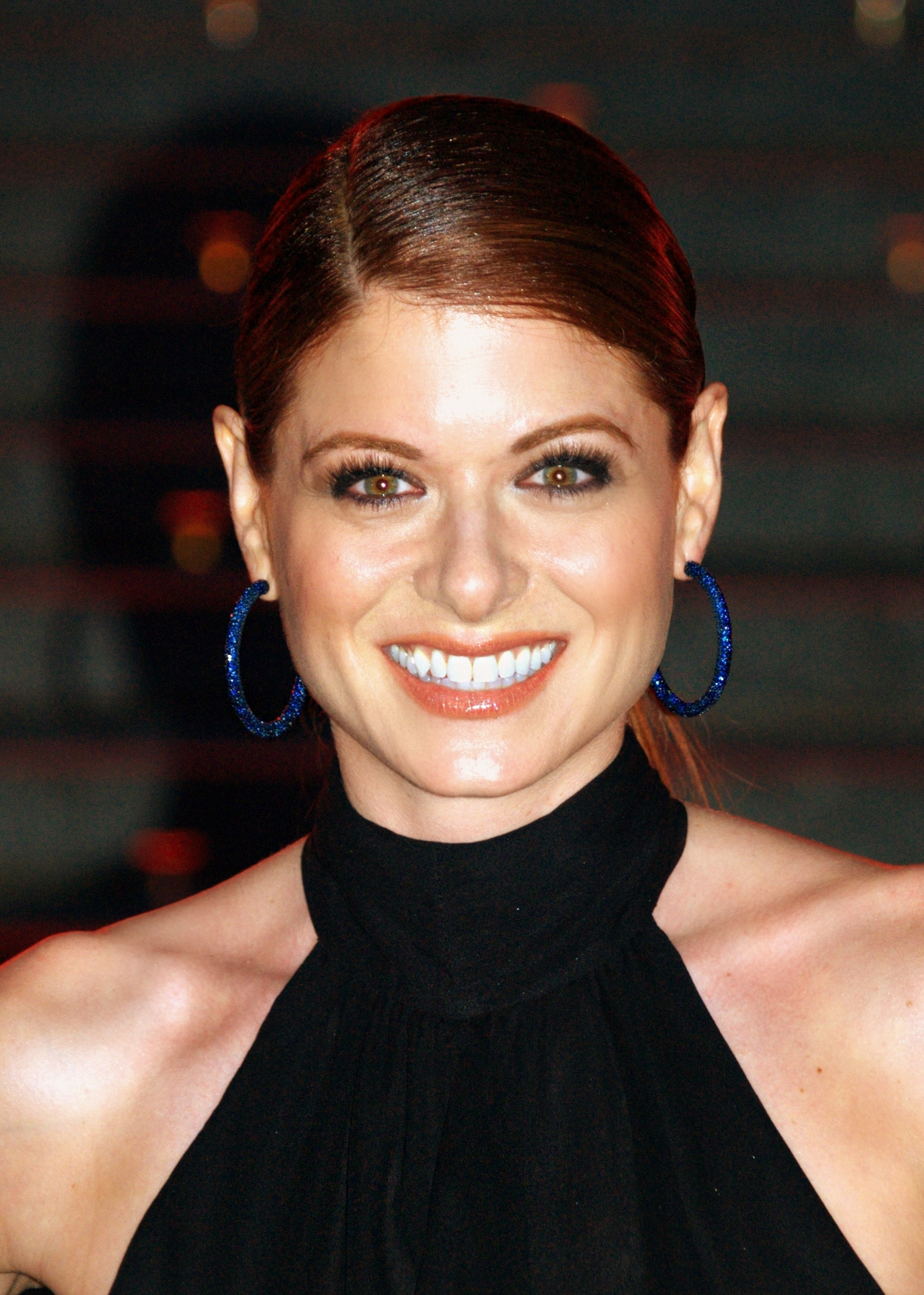
Debra Messing, who plays Grace, thought Will & Grace fans would be satisfied with the finale.

The episode was shot in Studio City, California on Stage 17 at CBS Studio Center. It was filmed on April 10, 11 and 13, 2006. The make-up effects used in Grace's dream and the scenes fifteen years into the future were done by Academy Award-winning make-up artists. Kohan and Mutchnick joined long-time director James Burrows on the set as filming began. The cast and crew tried to remain cheerful in front of the live audience between takes while the writers gathered in a room to rework lines for potentially larger laughs. However, "there were a lot of snotty, tearful faces all around the set. When we got to the very, very last scene, everybody was just a mess. We started sobbing and hugging each other," said Megan Mullally, who plays Karen. Eric McCormack, who portrays Will, commented that his saddest moment was "the last time I stood in Will's kitchen. That was the most colorful position for me, standing there and stirring something. It was my pulpit, the place where I delivered my best jokes."

The set was already being broken down the day after filming finished. Debra Messing, who plays Grace, said it was "cordoned off like an accident scene. It was a shock to see parts of it gone already." Each cast member was allowed to keep their favorite souvenir from the set. Messing took the door to Grace's office; she wanted to lean it up against the wall at her house as a piece of modern art. Sean Hayes was given a couple of pieces from Will's apartment: "There's a leather box that was on Will’s desk that I want to find a place for." Mullally chose a simple portrait from one of the walls, and McCormack took a small ceramic dog, though he said he would have taken everything if he could.

The cast members of the show took the news about the show ending well. Hayes said: "I'm proud of being a part of something in history and I'm proud to have been given a platform to make people laugh." McCormack added, "We have never taken ourselves or this show too seriously but now that it's over I take our collective achievement very, very seriously." The actors were satisfied with the episode and thought the viewers would find it satisfying as well. "It's daring and ambitious and more far-reaching than most finales go. I think people will be quite surprised," McCormack said. Messing added: "I think Will & Grace fans will be satisfied. Ultimately, [the episode] was done beautifully and it ties up loose ends for all of the characters in a way that's wonderful."

== Broadcast and reception ==
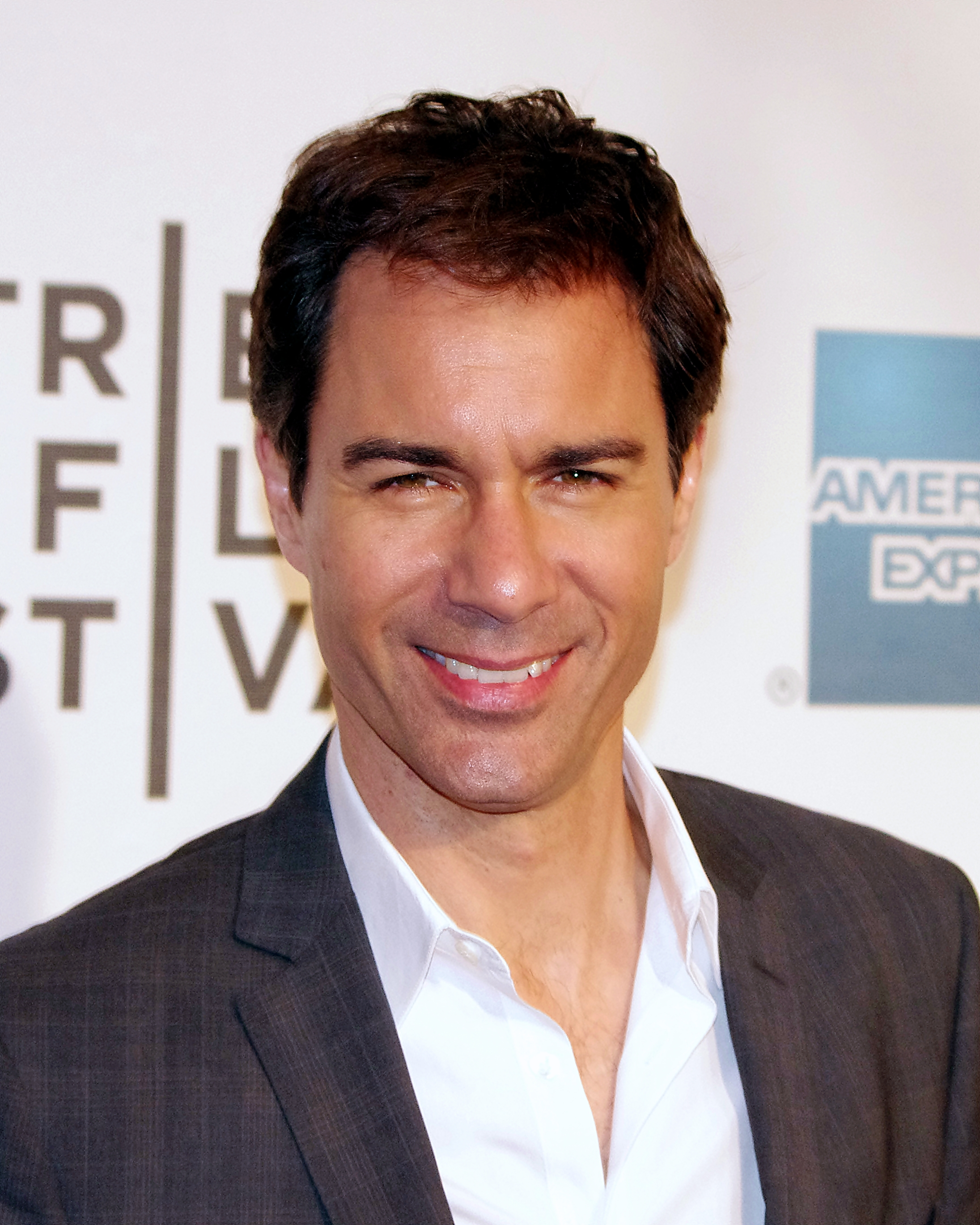
Eric McCormack and the rest of the main cast members appeared on The Oprah Winfrey Show and The Today Show to bid farewell.

The series finale was heavily promoted by NBC, and the main cast members appeared on The Oprah Winfrey Show, The Today Show, and Live with Regis and Kelly to bid farewell. NBC devoted a two-hour block in its primetime schedule on May 18, 2006, for the Will & Grace send-off. An hour-long series retrospective, "Say Goodnight Gracie", featuring interviews with the cast, crew, and guest stars, preceded the hour-long series finale. The retrospective was viewed by an estimated 12.7 million viewers, while the finale drew 18.43 million viewers and a Nielsen rating of 11.5/18, making it the most watched episode of the final two seasons of Will & Grace.

Since airing, the episode has received mixed reviews from television critics. Richard Keller of TV Squad thought the finale's theme of Will and Grace's connection to each other was well-presented by director James Burrows. Keller added, "While not as satisfying as, say, the Friends finale or as crushing as the Seinfeld finale, the series finale to Will & Grace did have its moments and came back to the original concept of friendship among a close group of people. There were some moments where I did laugh out loud, but they were few." CHUD.com's David Oliver praised the finale for not having characters "go on wild tangents that betray who they were during the entirety of the show's run." He also commented that Messing and McCormack are "affecting in their performances" and the episode "nicely summarizes [Will and Grace's] friendship over the course of the entire show."

Some critics criticized the finale for putting the action in several different time periods. Jennifer Armstrong of Entertainment Weekly said "we endure a swirl of confusing, unnecessary sequences, from Grace's dream to current reality to two years later to their kids' first day of college to their kids' impending wedding. By the end, instead of being sad to bid adieu, we're just relieved not to have yet another disbelief-suspending flash-forward thrust upon us." Jim Schembri of The Sydney Morning Herald wrote: "The time-jumping device is overused and a tad awkward but, by and large, it’s a noble finale to one of the better standard three-wall sitcoms from America." Amy Amatangelo of Zap2it commented that Will & Grace "is a show that spent eight seasons predicated on the lasting friendship of Will and Grace, and we're supposed to believe that they spent over 20 years not talking to each other just because their lives went in different directions? That there is no way their friendship could have been sustained once they both found the love of their life?" Amatangelo enjoyed Jack and Karen's performance of "Unforgettable", but the rest of the finale she "could have done without."
