= Maria Thayer =

American actress (born 1975)

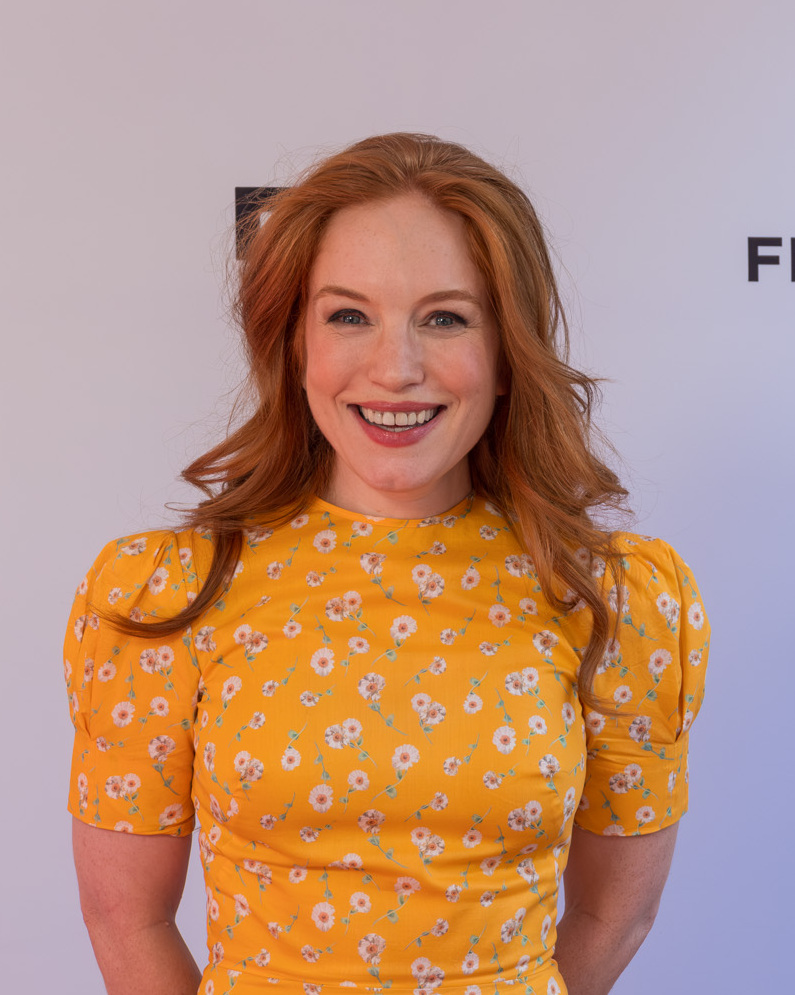
- Thayer in 2026
- Born: Maria Christina Thayer; October 30, 1975 (age 51); Portland, Oregon, U.S.
- Education: Juilliard School (BFA)
- Occupations: Actress, comedian
- Years active: 1999–present

Maria Christina Thayer (born October 30, 1975) is an American actress and comedian. She first earned public recognition for her portrayal of Tammi Littlenut on the cult series Strangers with Candy in 1999. Thayer has also had supporting roles in the comedy films Hitch (2005), Accepted (2006), and Forgetting Sarah Marshall (2008).

She has appeared in numerous television series, including a lead role on the Adult Swim series Eagleheart (2011–2014), and a lead role as Abbey Logan on the comedy series Those Who Can't. She played the title role in the movie Night of the Living Deb.

== Early life ==
Thayer was born in Portland, Oregon, and spent her early life in the small town of Boring, east of Portland, where her parents owned a bee farm. During her childhood, the family relocated to Apple Valley, Minnesota, where she attended Apple Valley High School and was a member of the award-winning forensics program and the National Forensic League, as well as 1993 Homecoming Queen. She studied acting at The Juilliard School in New York.

== Career ==
In 2005, Thayer appeared in Hitch with Will Smith and Eva Mendes.

In Forgetting Sarah Marshall, Thayer plays a woman on holiday with a new husband, played by Jack McBrayer. Thayer and McBrayer reunited on an episode of 30 Rock in which she portrays Kenneth Parcell's blind love interest (who may be a distant relative). She also played Grace and Leo's daughter, Lila, in the series finale of Will & Grace (2006). In 2009, she appeared in the film State of Play as Sonia Baker, the researcher and mistress of a congressman.

Thayer stars in the Adult Swim comedy series Eagleheart, which began airing on February 3, 2011, on Cartoon Network. She appeared as Tracey Bluth in the fourth season of Arrested Development in flashback scenes. In 2012, she was featured in the music video "Sensitive Man" by Nick Lowe.

In 2014, Thayer played the sudden wife of Forrest MacNeill (Andy Daly) on the Comedy Central show Review for the episode "Marry, Run, Party" of the first season.

Starting in 2015, she starred in the TruTV sitcom Those Who Can't as an incompetent teacher at a Denver high school, alongside Ben Roy, Adam Cayton-Holland and Andrew Orvedahl (The Grawlix).

== Personal life ==
Thayer was previously engaged to actor David Harbour.

== Filmography ==
=== Film ===
Year	Title	Role	Notes
1999	Kimberly	Louise	
2001	Storytelling	Amy	Segment: "Fiction"
2001	Scratch		Short film
2005	Strangers with Candy	Tamela "Tammi" Littlenut	
2005	Hitch	Lisa	
2006	Accepted	Rory Thayer	
2008	Forgetting Sarah Marshall	Wyoma	
2009	State of Play	Sonia Baker	
2011	Let Go	Beth	
2015	Night of the Living Deb	Deborah Clarington	
2017	Table 19	Infamous Kate Milner	

=== Television ===
Year	Title	Role	Notes
1999–2000	Strangers with Candy	Tamela "Tammi" Littlenut	14 episodes
2001	Big Apple	Rosemary	3 episodes
2001	The Education of Max Bickford	Tina	Episode: "Herding Cats"
2003	Miss Match	Chelsea Greer	Episode: "Pilot"
2003	Law & Order: Criminal Intent	Claire Brody	Episode: "A Murderer Among Us"
2004	Comedy Lab	Jill	Episode: "12:21"
2005	Romancing the Bride	Kimmy	Television film
2006	Will & Grace	Laila	Episode: "The Finale"
2006	The Colbert Report	Jenny (voice)	Episode: "Will Power"
2006	Nip/Tuck	Transplant Consultant	Episode: "Burt Landau"
2006	Law & Order: Special Victims Unit	Hope	Episode: "Infiltrated"
2008	Lipstick Jungle	Cassidy	3 episodes
2009	30 Rock	Jennifer Rogers	Episode: "St. Valentine's Day"
2009	House	Annie	Episode: "Both Sides Now"
2010	Important Things with Demetri Martin	Edith	Episode: "Strategy"
2010	Our Show		Television film
2011	Traffic Light	Esme	Episode: "Credit Balance"
2011	Harry's Law	Julie Cassidy	Episode: "Purple Hearts"
2011	Annie Claus is Coming to Town	Annie	
2011–2014	Eagleheart	Susie Wagner	24 episodes
2012	Louie	Rental Car Lady	Episode: "Dad"
2012	New Girl	Amelia	Episode: "Halloween"
2013	Cougar Town	Lisa Riggs	3 episodes
2013	Portlandia		Episode: "Nina's Birthday"
2013	Family Tools	Wendy Doyle	Episode: "Now You See Me, Now You Don't"
2013	Maron	Megan	Episode: "Dominatrix"
2013	Arrested Development	Tracey Bluth	Episode: "It Gets Better"
2014	Review	Eliza	Episode: "Marry; Run; Party"
2014	American Dad!	Nun (voice)	Episode: "Cock of the Sleepwalk"
2014	Dads	Maria	Episode: "Baby Face"
2014	Men at Work	Bridget	Episode: "Molly"
2014–2016	Comedy Bang! Bang!	Monica Dubinsky / Marissa Price	4 episodes
2014	Mulaney	The Doula	Episode: "The Doula"
2014	The League	Cheryl	2 episodes
2015	Man Seeking Woman	Maude	Episode: "Dram"
2015	Kroll Show	Duchess Tina	Episode: "The Time of My Life"
2015	Difficult People	Nicole	Episode: "The Courage of a Soldier"
2015	Gotham	Scottie Mullen	2 episodes
2015	Married	Kristi	Episode: "Gymnastics"
2016-2019	Those Who Can't	Abbey Logan	3 seasons
2016	The Mindy Project	Courtney	3 episodes
2017	The Catch	Gretchen	Episode: "The Knock-Off"
2017	Brooklyn Nine-Nine	Jean Munhroe	Episode: "The Venue"
2018	Robot Chicken	Julia Child, Helen, Woman (voice)	Episode: "Why Is It Wet?"
2020	Robot Chicken	Rita Repulsa, Jeffrey's Mom, Bird (voice)	Episode: "Sundancer Craig in: 30% of the Way to Crying"
2020	A.P. Bio	Molly	Episode: "Get Hoppy”
2021	Superstore	Hannah	4 episodes
2026	St. Denis Medical	Carolyn	Episode: "You're in His Bubble Space"
2026	Ghosts	Margaret	Episode: "Halloween 6: The Mirror"

=== Music videos ===
Year	Artist	Title	Role
2011	Hospitality	"Friends of Friends"	Friend in Glasses
2012	Nick Lowe	"Sensitive Man"	Girlfriend

== Stage ==
Year	Title	Role	Notes
2002	Necessary Targets	Nuna	Variety Arts Theatre
2002	Endpapers	Sara Maynard	Variety Arts Theatre
2012	Unscreened	Stranger in the Park	Elephant Theatre Company
2013	Love's Labour's Lost	Rosaline	Delacorte Theater
