= Will Truman =

Fictional character

- Will & Grace character
- Eric McCormack as Will Truman in Will & Grace
- First appearance: "Pilot" (episode 1.01)
- Last appearance: "It's Time" (episode 11.18)
- Created by: Max Mutchnick
- Portrayed by: Eric McCormack

In-universe information
- Full name: William Truman
- Nicknames: Will; Wilma (by Karen); Will Woman (a play on Truman); Willard (by Nathan)
- Gender: Male
- Title(s): William Truman, Esq.
- Occupation: Attorney; College professor
- Family: George Truman (father; deceased); Marilyn Truman (mother); Paul Truman (brother); Peggy Truman (sister-in-law); Sam Truman (brother); Jordan Truman (nephew); Casey Truman (niece); Martin Adler (stepfather); Janet Adler (stepsister); Grace Adler (stepsister); Joyce Adler (stepsister)
- Spouses: Vince D'Angelo (ex-civil partner)
- Children: Ben Truman (son, with Vince, in the flash-forward; retconned from the revival)

William Truman is a fictional character and one of the two protagonists on the American sitcom Will & Grace. Portrayed by the actor Eric McCormack, the character is a lawyer who lives on the Upper West Side of Manhattan in New York City with his best friend, Grace Adler (Debra Messing). The series is centered around Will and Grace's relationship, and their interactions with the two other main characters, Karen Walker (Megan Mullally) and Jack McFarland (Sean Hayes).

== Fictional character history ==
Will was born on October 23, 1966, in Bridgeport, Connecticut, to WASP parents Marilyn (Blythe Danner) and George Truman (Sydney Pollack). He has two brothers, Paul (Jon Tenney) and Sam (John Slattery in the first season, Steven Weber in the eighth). Will and Grace met in college and began dating, while Will was in denial about being gay. He came out as gay in 1985, when—after being accused of living in denial by then-acquaintance Jack McFarland—he found himself attracted to a poster of Kevin Bacon. Will then realized that his relationship with Grace masked his true sexuality. He and Grace had a fight after Will came out to her—after proposing marriage to her in a desperate means of avoiding sex—and did not speak to each other for a year. Eventually, however, they reconciled and became inseparable best friends, after running into each other at D'AGOSTINO.

After graduating from Columbia University and NYU School of Law, he started working for a successful law firm on track to make partner, but decided to quit and start his own practice. His practice folds in the show's second season after his main client Harlin Polk (Gary Grubbs) fires him, and he begins working for the law firm Doucette & Stein (Doucette played by Gregory Hines and Stein played by Gene Wilder), where he remains until the end of the seventh season, when he quits to do something more meaningful with his life.

Will's next job is working for the mysterious Malcolm (Alec Baldwin), but that comes to an end when Malcolm reveals that he is a CIA agent who's protecting a back-from-the-dead former client—Karen's husband, Stanley Walker. In the eighth season, Will takes a job at the Coalition of Justice, a business providing legal support for people who cannot afford it. He ultimately returns to Doucette & Stein, taking back his old job after being offered a partnership by his new boss at the firm, Margo (Lily Tomlin).

In the ninth season, after being promoted to senior partner, Will finally quits from the firm for good after realizing that this is not what he wants, and partners with Grace at Grace Adler Designs. In the tenth season, Will works as a part-time law professor at New York University, before eventually securing a full-time position midway through the season.

In season 11, Will decides to have a child. He hires a surrogate named Jenny (Demi Lovato) to carry his baby.

== Relationships ==
=== Grace Adler ===
Will and Grace have been best friends since college. They dated in 1985, before Will realized that he was gay; after he came out to her, she was so hurt that they didn't speak for a year, but they eventually reconciled and became inseparable best friends. They move in together after Grace breaks up with her fiance Danny and live together for a year. At the beginning of the second season, Grace moves out, albeit only across the hall. They are on-and-off roommates for the rest of the series. Their relationship is somewhat codependent, with each basing the future of every romantic relationship on whether the other approves. Other characters in the series, particularly Jack and Karen, often compare their relationship to a dysfunctional marriage.

In the fifth season, Will and Grace decide to have a baby together through in vitro fertilization. The process is repeatedly delayed through a series of mishaps, however, and Grace changes her mind after she begins dating Leo Markus (Harry Connick, Jr.), whom she marries later in the season. Will is hurt that she does not want to have a baby with him, and the ensuing argument nearly ruins their friendship. Eventually, however, they both realize that they just want the other to be happy, and reconcile.

Will and Grace become roommates again in the sixth season when Grace admits her marriage to Leo is deteriorating, and Will supports her in the seventh season when she decides to get a divorce from Leo for cheating on her. In the eighth season, Grace finds out that she is pregnant with Leo's child after a chance encounter with him, and she and Will plan on raising the child together. In the series finale, however, Grace has a nightmare that the two will become miserable and resentful from raising the child, and thus reunites with Leo when he proposes to her again. Will feels betrayed and ends their friendship. They do not see each other again for two years. By the time they reconcile, they both have their own families, and they find that they have no time for each other. They drift apart, until 16 years later, when they meet again while helping their children move into the same college dorm. Will's son, Ben (Ben Newmark), and Grace's daughter, Lila (Maria Thayer), begin dating and eventually marry, and Will and Grace once again become close friends.

When the series was revived in 2017, the events of the original 2006 finale were retconned. While Grace and Leo did remarry, they never had any children and were going through a divorce. Grace moves back in with Will while her divorce is being finalized. When Grace gets pregnant in the 11th season, Will plans to raise their children with her, and they eventually buy a house together in Upstate New York. In the series finale, Grace goes into labor as they are packing up the apartment, and Will leaves with her, Jack, and Karen to go to the hospital.

=== Jack McFarland ===
Will and Jack meet in 1985, and Jack sees immediately that Will is gay. Jack helps Will come out and find the confidence to start dating men, and the two become best friends. That closeness does not prevent them from trading insults with each other at virtually every opportunity: Will makes fun of Jack's promiscuity, effeminate behavior and perpetual unemployment, while Jack mocks Will's stagnant love-life and enjoys calling Will "fat and bald" (which he clearly isn't). However, on several occasions, Jack has confessed his love for Will, and it is occasionally suggested that Jack is attracted to him. Jack is often portrayed sponging off of Will, who pays half of his rent, gives him money to pay his back taxes, and foots the bill for clothes and meals.

=== Karen Walker ===
In the beginning of the series, Will has an antagonistic relationship with Grace's assistant Karen Walker; she makes fun of his sexuality, while he mocks her alcoholism and vain, spoiled demeanor. They warm up to each other somewhat after Will becomes Karen's lawyer, although they continue to mock each other ruthlessly. Throughout the series' run, however, Karen has expressed concern for him and has even offered her friendship, albeit in her own sarcastic fashion. In one eighth-season episode, they get drunk together and bond over their troubles, while still bantering incessantly. She also comforts him at his father's funeral. In the series finale, Will and Karen are portrayed as still being friends 18 years in the future.

=== Romances ===
Will has had romantic relationships with three women: Claire (Megyn Price), his high school girlfriend; Grace, whom he dated in college; and Diane (Mira Sorvino), with whom he had a one-night stand after he and Grace broke up. Diane had a brief cameo in season 3, episode 8, "Lows In The Mid-Eighties," played by another actor. Diane is the only woman Will has ever had sex with.

At the beginning of the series, Will's most successful relationship was with his long-term boyfriend Michael (Chris Potter/Cheyenne Jackson), with whom he was with from 1989 to November 1996. They briefly reconcile in 2018 but Will ends it once more after realizing that Michael is manipulative and controlling.

In the seventh season, he enters into a serious relationship with NYPD officer Vince D'Angelo (Bobby Cannavale). They break up after Vince, who loses two consecutive jobs because he can't resist trying on gloves while on duty, needs to take some time off for himself from their relationship. The two reunite during the funeral of Will's father in season eight and are shown to be raising a son together, Ben Truman, after the series' time-jump in the 2006 series finale. Nearly twenty years later, Ben, who was conceived through in vitro fertilization with a surrogate, goes off to college and meets Grace's daughter, Laila Markus, whom he would eventually marry.

In the 2017 revival of the series, the events of the original 2006 finale were retconned. In the new continuity, Will and Vince were together for five years. They never had children, as it was revealed that Ben and the series' original time-jump were figments of Karen's imagination. Vince visits Will and informs him that he is getting married and invites him to his wedding ceremony. Will tries to be happy for Vince, but is secretly insecure, not knowing why their relationship ended. When Will shows up at the wedding and his toast at the reception end up being condescending, Vince reveals that they broke up because Will criticized everything he did and did not really appreciate him. Vince and Will then manage to patch things up somewhat, Will assuring Vince he is not making a mistake with his marriage and the two fondly reminiscing about the time they had together.

In the 10th season, Will begins dating McCoy Whitman (Matt Bomer), a famous news anchor. Although they have problems at first due to McCoy's insecurity and Will's fear of commitment, they eventually move in together, and Will finally proposes to him during Jack's wedding. In the season 11 premiere, they get into a discussion about having children and start making plans to adopt. However, several episodes later, McCoy changes his mind and admits to Will that he is not ready to have children and needs to break off their engagement if this becomes a problem for them. This prompts Will to break up with him so he can continue with his adoption plans. In the series finale, however, Will and McCoy get back together.

=== Family ===
Will comes from a wealthy but dysfunctional family of Connecticut WASPs. His relationship with his parents is complicated, particularly with his father, who is uncomfortable with his son's sexuality. In season eight, the two have a fight in which George confesses that he wishes Will wasn't gay. A few days later, having not spoken with Will since the fight, George dies of a heart attack. Will is devastated, but he learns from the tragedy to be more open about his feelings, especially with people he loves.

Will is close with his mother, Marilyn, played by Blythe Danner. Marilyn admits Will is her favorite son in s4 e10 'Moveable Feast Part 2'. Marilyn also admits, however, that she was unable to pick up Will for the first year of his life (season 7, 'Christmas Break'). Still, the pair have a close bond, living together after the breakdown of his parents' marriage, visiting the gym together, sharing clothes, and many dinners.

He was once very close to his brother Sam, but they stopped speaking to each other following a fight over Sam's marriage (Will disliked Sam's wife). They do not see each other for five years after that, until, in the first-season episode "Big Brother is Coming", Grace engineers a chance meeting and forces them to talk out their problems. They have another fight in the following episode when Will finds out that Sam and Grace slept together, but they eventually repair their relationship.

== Reception ==
The character was met with a mixed reception from critics; some applauded him for not conforming to gay stereotypes, while others criticized him as a safe version of a gay man designed to be more palatable to heterosexual viewers. Nevertheless, McCormack won a Primetime Emmy Award for Outstanding Lead Actor in a Comedy Series in 2001 for his performance.
