= Grace Adler =

Fictional character from Will & Grace played by Debra Messing

- Will & Grace character
- Debra Messing as Grace Adler in Will & Grace
- First appearance: "Pilot" (episode 1.01)
- Last appearance: "It's Time" (episode 11.18)
- Created by: David Kohan; Max Mutchnick
- Portrayed by: Debra Messing

In-universe information
- Full name: Grace Elizabeth Adler (birth name); Grace Elizabeth Adler-Markus (former married name)
- Nicknames: Gracie, G, GG (by Karen Walker) Gracious, Gross Adler
- Gender: Female
- Occupation: Interior designer
- Family: Martin Adler (father); Bobbi Adler (mother, deceased); Janet Adler (sister); Joyce Adler (sister); Fiona (niece); Marilyn Truman (stepmother); Paul Truman (stepbrother); Sam Truman (stepbrother); Will Truman (stepbrother)
- Spouses: James Hanson (m. 2006; ann. 2006); Marvin "Leo" Markus (m. 2002; div. 2004) (m. 2006; div. 2017)
- Relatives: Dr. Jay Markus (former father-in-law); Eleanor Markus (former mother-in-law)
- Religion: Judaism

Grace Elizabeth Adler (formerly Adler-Markus) is a fictional character and one of the two titular protagonists in the American sitcom Will & Grace, portrayed by Debra Messing. She is a Jewish interior designer living in New York City, who lives with her gay best friend, Will Truman (Eric McCormack), for a majority of the series. She is also the employer of Karen Walker (Megan Mullally) and a friend and neighbor of Jack McFarland (Sean Hayes).

== Character overview ==
Grace was born on April 7, 1967, in Schenectady, New York. She was particularly influenced by her mother, Bobbi (Debbie Reynolds), a flamboyant actress from whom she inherited her many neuroses. Grace also constantly strives for the affection of her father Martin (Alan Arkin, then Robert Klein), competing with her two sisters (one younger, one older), who have more obvious problems than she (Joyce, played by Sara Rue, is a compulsive overeater, while Janet, portrayed by Geena Davis then Mary McCormack, is rarely employed and promiscuous). Grace herself is decidedly selfish and neurotic, but this is usually played for laughs, like when her husband Leo (Harry Connick Jr.) asks, "You want me to be happy, right?" and she sweetly replies "Not if it affects me negatively in any way." She is also somewhat vain, once declaring herself to be a "frickin' bombshell" and believing that she bears a strong resemblance to red-haired celebrities like Rita Hayworth (once even thinking a photo of Hayworth was one of herself) and Nicole Kidman as well as Julia Roberts. This, however, leads to her being taken down a peg, and she is usually the butt of numerous jokes by other characters. In one episode, while in Los Angeles, she is repeatedly mistaken for Kathy Griffin by tourists. She is a Democrat and a graduate of Columbia University and the Fashion Institute.

Grace's quirks and physical abnormalities are often fodder for the show's antics. Like the fact that her red hair is unnatural. She has a remarkably flat chest, even more so than junior high school girls. And Karen (who is well-endowed) often teases her for it. She has gargantuan feet, even for her height, and she's often ridiculed for them. She comments that she has "feet the size of canoes" that were the only things her father ever gave her. When Will pulls a pair of over-sized footwear out of a box of her childhood memorabilia, she remarks "Those are my ballet slippers from fourth grade! I went from a four to an eight in a month!" When Grace met another woman with big feet named Julie, she commented, “Yeah. I waited my whole life to develop, and those are the only things that grew.” In one episode, Will remarked of her feet: “Stop trying to squeeze into a size 6!” In another episode, she and Will travel to Los Angeles and visit the Hollywood Walk of Fame, and Grace finds that her hands and feet fit perfectly into John Wayne's hand and footprints ("Was he really tiny, or am I just a monster?"). Leo Markus, attempts to exchange a foot massager Grace received from the store because she herself was too embarrassed to return it herself due to her lanky, gangly foot size. Will, Karen and Jack often tease her about her freakishly big feet. Jack himself has referred to her as "Bigfoot's Cousin". Despite her own issues with her own oversized feet, she once dumped a man because he had an extra toe.

There is a general running joke that she is slovenly and unladylike, which contrasts with Will's fastidiousness, usually for purposes of comedy. She is very cheap, freeloads and often hoards free things (such as pretending to have a drinking problem in order to get free food and therapy at Alcoholics Anonymous meetings) and even steals. She once mentions selling Will's college term papers for a profit, of which Will had no knowledge. She is considerably athletic (particularly at baseball), in contrast with Will’s complete ineptitude at sports.

In the 10th season episode "Grace's Secret", Grace reveals that she was sexually assaulted at age 15 by her father's best friend, Harry.

In the 11th season, Grace discovers that she is pregnant, the result of a one-night stand while on vacation. She decides to raise the child with Will, who is also having a child via surrogate. In the series finale, she goes into labor and Will, Jack, and Karen go with her to the hospital to have the baby and begin a new chapter in her life.

Debra Messing said that she asked the producers to make Grace explicitly Jewish and requested references to Camp Ramah, intending the character to be recognizable to Jewish viewers without being reduced to a stereotype.

== Relationships ==
=== Will ===
Grace's best friend since college is Will Truman, and their relationship is the focus of the show. They met at a college party at Columbia University. Through the third-season episode "Lows in the Mid-Eighties", we see they began dating and Grace did not realize that Will was gay at the time, and Will had not come out of the closet yet. Will "proposed" to Grace during Thanksgiving, in an effort to postpone actually having sex with her. When he finally came out to her hours later, Grace was so angry with him that she didn't speak to him for a year. They ran into each other at a grocery store a year later, made up, and became inseparable best friends. Grace moves into Will's apartment in season 1 when she breaks up with her fiancé, Danny (Tom Verica). She moves out in season 2 to declare her independence – albeit only to an apartment across the hall. She moves back in by season 3. She eventually moves to Brooklyn in season 5 when she marries Leo, but moves back in with Will in season 7 when she gets divorced.

Her closeness to Will is a running joke throughout the series; many other characters refer to them as a married couple. They can finish each other's sentences, which helps them in their fast rounds in trivia and parlor games. They can also be quite dysfunctional and co-dependent, sometimes even requiring the other's approval of clothing and boyfriends. When Will begins dating his future husband Vince D'Angelo (Bobby Cannavale) in season 6, Will is nervous about Grace's opinion of him, noting that he has ended relationships because Grace disliked one detail about them (one example given is that all Grace had to say about one such boyfriend Will was about to move in with was "mock turtleneck," and the relationship was ruined).

In the revived series, which retcons the events of the first series finale, Grace has divorced Leo, and is once again living with Will. They go into business together briefly, before Will gets a job as a law professor. When she gets pregnant in the 11th season, she decides to raise the baby with Will, and they buy a house together in Upstate New York. In the series finale, she goes into labor, and Will assures her that they can do this together as he goes with her to the hospital.

=== Jack and Karen ===
Grace also has a close relationship with her assistant, Karen Walker, a rich, alcoholic socialite who does virtually no work. Karen is nevertheless useful to Grace, as she pays for her employer's health insurance, gives Grace holiday bonuses, and occasionally uses her society connections to help Grace get work. Otherwise, Karen spends her "work" hours drinking and belittling Grace. Karen routinely criticizes Grace's choices in fashion (usually by disdainfully asking, "Honey, what's this all about?") and men. Karen doesn't exactly withhold her judgments; in one episode, when Will calls Grace at work and Karen answers, she puts him on hold and says "Grace, the reason you're not in a relationship is on line one." Nonetheless, Grace and Karen become close friends over the years. Grace eventually learns to look past Karen's faults, and Karen occasionally does stop ridiculing her to reveal a softer, more caring side. In one episode, Grace stands up to Milo (Andy García) after he refuses to go on a second date with Karen, who is feeling vulnerable because she is going through a divorce. In another instance, Karen turns down Grace's proposal for a business loan to protect her, as Grace does not have a strong business plan.

Grace also has a close bond with Will's other best friend, Jack McFarland. Early in the series, Jack and Grace dislike each other, seeing each other as a rival for Will's affections. However, after they spend time together while Will is in the Cayman Islands between seasons 2 and 3, they develop a closer friendship. They still antagonize one another, however, often leading to Grace striking Jack in some manner.

=== Romantic relationships ===
Grace has a string of boyfriends throughout the series, many played by guest stars such as Woody Harrelson and Gregory Hines. Grace marries Leo Markus (Harry Connick, Jr.), a Jewish doctor on November 21, 2002, but the marriage ends when he has a one-night stand with a doctor from the Red Cross while working in Cambodia with Doctors Without Borders. In season 8, the two reunite briefly during a flight to London when they coincidentally meet on the plane. Their mile high tryst leads to Grace getting pregnant, but she doesn't tell Leo because he is engaged to another woman. However, in the series finale, she and Leo remarry and raise the baby, a girl named Laila, together. Laila is born in Rome, where Leo is working at a hospital as a researcher. After living in Rome for a year, the family moves back to New York, to their apartment in Brooklyn. Laila (Maria Thayer) goes on to attend college and there meets Will and Vince's son, Ben (Ben Newmark). Laila and Ben are living in dorm rooms opposite each other's while at college; the same scenario that Will and Grace found themselves in while they attended college. Ben and Laila marry soon afterward.

When the series was revived in 2017, the events of the season finale – in which Grace gives birth to Leo's child and drifts apart from Will – are retconned as one of Karen's drug and alcohol-induced hallucinations. In this continuity, Grace has recently divorced Leo, has never had children, and has moved back in with Will while she recovers from the divorce. When Leo reappears sometime later, it is revealed that the marriage ended because Grace did not trust Leo not to cheat on her again, and because she was closer to Will than to her own husband. Despite the couple trying months of therapy and taking up golf together, they could not make it work and Grace, unable to forgive Leo, turned to Will for comfort.

In season 10, Grace enters a serious relationship with Noah Boarder (David Schwimmer), after several tense meetings where he tries to sabotage her campaign for interior design president. Their romance slowly blossoms, Grace gets to know Noah's daughter, and he eventually asks her to move in with him. In the season finale, when Noah is unable to come to Jack's wedding, Grace is not happy after overhearing Will say she can do much better than him and begins to wonder where their relationship is going. After meeting Marcus (Reid Scott), a fellow traveler who plans on traveling the world indefinitely in an effort to find himself, Grace decides to leave the country with him to find true happiness.

In the season 11 premiere, Grace returns to New York from her whirlwind European adventure, during which she had sex with Marcus. During a doctor's appointment, Grace is startled to find that she is pregnant. When Marcus reappears in the next episode, Grace tells him that she is pregnant with his child, only for Marcus to tell her that he had a vasectomy. Karen then gathers three other men that Grace had sex with during her European adventure in an effort to find out who her baby's father is via a DNA test. Marcus shows up, admits to Grace that he lied about getting a vasectomy, and promises that he will sacrifice his dreams and do everything he can to raise her baby with her. Grace then decides she does not want to know the identity of the father for the time being – all she wants to do is raise the baby, either alone or with someone who loves her.

Grace has a reputation for "turning" men gay. Several of her boyfriends – such as Will himself, and her second-season boyfriend Josh (Corey Parker) – have turned out to be gay, and she has a recurring fear that this will happen again. In one episode, she enters a room to find her boyfriend Nathan (Woody Harrelson) passed out on a bed with Jack and Will, and moans, "Oh, no, I turned another one." In season 8, she takes this to a new level when she briefly marries James Hanson (Taye Diggs), Will's Canadian boyfriend, in search of a green card. They annul the marriage a few days later, after Will and James break up.

== Reception ==
For her performance as Grace Adler, Messing received 5 nominations for the Primetime Emmy Award for Outstanding Lead Actress in a Comedy Series, winning once in 2003.

== See also ==
- List of fictional Jews
