= Karen Walker (Will & Grace) =

Fictional character in Will and Grace

- Will & Grace character
- Megan Mullally as Walker in Will & Grace
- First appearance: "Pilot" (episode 1.01)
- Last appearance: "It's Time" (episode 11.18)
- Created by: Max Mutchnick
- Portrayed by: Megan Mullally

In-universe information
- Aliases: Shu-Shu Fontana; Anastasia Beaverhausen; Sister Frances Beaverhausen; Pilar Palabundar; Lupita
- Nicknames: Cruella (by Will); Miss Karen, Mami (by Rosario); Kare, Kay, Kare Bear (by Jack); Kiki (by Lois Whitley)
- Gender: Female
- Title(s): Chairman, CEO, and Board Member (Walker, Inc.)
- Occupation: Current: Businesswoman; Personal assistant to Grace Adler; Socialite; Former: Personal assistant to Jack McFarland (at Out TV; fired)
- Family: Mr. Delaney (father; deceased); Lois Whitley (mother; deceased); Virginia "Ginny" Delaney (sister)
- Spouses: Mr. St. Croix (ex-husband); Dick Popeil (ex-husband); Stanley Walker (m. 1995; div. 2003) (m. 2005; div. 2018) (m. 2020); Lyle Finster (m. 2004; div. 2004)
- Children: Mason Walker (stepson, via Stanley); Olivia Walker (stepdaughter, via Stanley); Lorraine Finster (former stepdaughter, via Lyle)
- Relatives: Sylvia Walker (mother-in-law, via Stanley); Kimmie Walker (sister-in-law, via Stanley); Jonny Walker (brother-in-law, via Stanley); Dan Lee Walker (brother-in-law, via Stanley); Barry (cousin); Gina (cousin); Sumner Davis (nephew)

Karen Walker (née Delaney; formerly St. Croix, Popeil, and Finster) is a fictional character on the American television sitcom Will & Grace, portrayed by Megan Mullally. Although Karen was originally conceived as a supporting character role for Will & Grace, her escapades became a more prominent part of the show due to the popularity of the character with the audience. She was a multi-millionaire thanks to her marriage to Stanley Walker (an unseen character), until it was discovered that all of his money was loaned after their divorce in the series finale. However, at the end of the series, she regains this status.

The 2017 revival of the series retconned that revelation as one of Karen's daydreams; she is still rich and still married to Stan. However, in the tenth season, Karen and Stan go through another divorce after she is caught cheating on him with his friend, a government agent by the name of Malcolm Widmark (Alec Baldwin), and she struggles with her loneliness and erratic emotions.

Karen has been described by Grace Adler (Debra Messing) as "a spoiled, shrill, gold-digging socialite who would sooner chew off her own foot than do an honest day's work." She is also a promiscuous alcoholic/drug addict with an often tenuous grip on reality and very few morals. She’s best friends with Will Truman’s (Eric McCormack) equally narcissistic friend Jack McFarland (Sean Hayes). After Mullally spoke her lines in her normal speaking voice in the pilot, she increased her delivery in pitch in subsequent episodes until her distinct nasal voice became one of the character's trademarks. In 2010, Karen Walker was ranked No. 23 on the TV Guide Network special 25 Greatest TV Characters of All Time.

== Fictional character history ==
=== Early years ===
Karen Delaney was born on January 12, 1959 (which is revealed in the show's season 8). She had a difficult childhood, thanks in part to her unstable relationship with her mother, Lois Whitley (Suzanne Pleshette), a con artist who incorporated her young daughter into her schemes. Karen has made many references in the show to her education and her maiden name, Delaney, which suggest she is of Irish-American background.

Although she tries to keep her age a secret, Jack revealed that she was 42 in 2001, meaning she was born in January 1959. She has been married four times – her first husband's surname was St. Croix, her second husband was named Popeil (a reference to the American culinary businessman/entrepreneur Ron Popeil), her third was Stan Walker (married since 1995), and she was married for less than a day to Lyle Finster (John Cleese) in May 2004. As of the end of the series, she is still married to Stanley (see below), who has two children of his own, Olivia and Mason. She has intimated an illicit relationship with Ronald Reagan. Karen also goes under the alias "Anastasia Beaverhausen" ("Anastasia as in Russian royalty, Beaverhausen as in ... where the beaver live") and also once used the alias Pilar Palabundar to "beat up businessmen for cash in Chinatown." Fans of the Beaverhausen have created several interesting social media profiles, further fictionalizing both the alias character Anastasia and creating relatives. One of the more prominent iterations is Alexander Beaverhausen, who is a photographer in Dallas. Living a luxury life in Dallas but has strayed away from Anastasia.

Another alias was Lupita, used when she had an affair with a hotel janitor while trying to pass as a maid using Rosario's uniform. Her real name may not, in fact, be Karen, as she changes her name from time to time to "throw off the Feds." Her mother refers to her as "Kiki", which was her childhood nickname. She has made more than one reference to attending Sarah Lawrence College. She is noted also for her shrill, squeaky voice; in one episode in the third season, Karen inhales helium from a balloon, only for the gas to have absolutely no effect on her voice. She is also noted for her addiction to alcohol and prescription drugs.

Karen seems to have had a background in acting (including a performance in a soft-core adult film as a naughty maid); however, she vowed never to act again after her part as a bank teller in the TV show Mama's Family was cut. (Her one line was: "Would you like that in fives, tens, or fifteens?" delivered in a Southern accent). She has also spoken of a two-episode character arc in Dynasty.

Karen tends to have trouble separating stories she has read, seen, or heard about with her actual life. On one occasion she explains that she loves her family and then recites the story of Heidi, claiming it as her own. Another situation involves Karen's fear of elevators: she and Jack are walking up the stairs of a skyscraper because she refuses to use the elevator. Jack asks her why she's afraid of elevators, and she recounts the opening scene of the movie Speed (1994). She has also described the events of Norma Rae (1979) and To Sir, with Love (1967) as her own life experiences.

== Overview ==
=== Connection to other characters ===
To entertain herself, Karen takes a job as personal assistant to interior designer Grace Adler. Though she rarely accomplishes any work, she keeps the job because it keeps her "away from Stan and the kids", as she once told an intern. Karen actually quits Grace Adler Designs twice. First, when Grace found Karen in a dominatrix film and Karen was horribly embarrassed, and second, when Karen does a design job all on her own and Grace takes credit for it. In the first instance, Karen returned to the company at the end of the episode because Grace gave her 49 copies of the film (Grace keeps one—totaling 50) so "no one would have to see the tape again." The second time, Karen returned in the next episode. She becomes Jack's assistant at "Out TV", but she gets fired because she and Jack couldn't keep a professional relationship, and she then returned to Grace like "nothing ever happened", even though she remarks, "I missed you".

Despite her incompetence, Grace never fires her because of the business benefits from Karen's social contacts; Karen also pays for Grace's health insurance and Christmas bonus. For a long time, Karen never cashed any of the paychecks she was given because, being rich, she didn't need to; also, Karen and Grace had made a deal that, in exchange for not cashing the checks, Karen was not required to actually do any work. Instead, she kept them in a shoe box on her desk because she thought they were "pretty little blue pieces of paper." In one episode, when Stan cuts down on her extravagant spending habits, she cashes all her paychecks at once, nearly bankrupting Grace. Karen gives the money back to Grace in the end.

Karen and Grace are very close friends, despite Karen's constant criticisms and insults regarding Grace's clothing choices and personal life (often dismissing Grace's wardrobe with the comment "Honey, what is this? What's going on here?" What are we trying to say?"). Karen and Grace's best friend Will Truman initially dislike each other, but they gradually become friends as well. Through Grace, she also meets Jack McFarland, and they become inseparable best friends.

=== Karen's home life ===
For the first few seasons of the show, Karen lives with husband Stan Walker. Karen met Stan Walker in 1985, brushing off three simultaneous relationships (with Martina Navratilova, Sultan Habibi Shoshani Padush Al-Kabir, and a man named Clayton) to be with him, only to learn that Stan was married. After going through two other marriages, she finally got together with Stan 10 years later. At some point before this, she also agreed to appear in the fetishistic simply film Next to Godliness, a dominatrix flick. Stan is an obese man who was credited with keeping Taco Bell and Pizza Hut in business, and who has worn a toupee since his teens.

Stan was a mostly unseen character during the show's run, despite being mentioned in many episodes. His hands and legs were shown in the episode "New Will City" but his face never was shown. His two children by his first wife, Mason (whom Karen calls "the fat one") and Olivia ("the girl"), were often left in Karen's incompetent care.

In the fourth season, Stan is jailed for tax evasion and tells Karen to date other men. She cannot bring herself to do so until she meets rich bachelor Lionel Banks (Rip Torn), but just as their affair begins, Stan is released from jail. However, after Karen catches Stan with his mistress, Lorraine Finster (Minnie Driver), a cafeteria worker at the prison, the couple separate and Karen moves into the Palace hotel. After beginning divorce proceedings at the end of the fifth season, Stan dies suddenly. Despite cruelly mocking him for years, Karen is genuinely saddened by his death.

During season six, Karen pursues romantic liaisons and eventually marries Lyle Finster (John Cleese), Lorraine's father. However, after 20 minutes of marriage, she asks for a divorce upon realizing that Lyle puts his own needs ahead of hers.

Karen becomes the head of Walker, Inc. upon Stan's death. However, at the end of season seven, it is revealed that Stan faked his death and had actually been in hiding. Karen begins dating Malcolm (Alec Baldwin), a government agent who had helped Stan go underground. However, she ultimately reconciles with Stan, and Malcolm leaves on a government mission to Sri Lanka. But later in the eighth season, Karen and Stan experience significant marital difficulties. They finally choose to divorce, only for Karen to learn in season eight's finale that his money is borrowed, so she is now broke.

Karen then pressures Jack into a relationship with Beverley Leslie (played by Leslie Jordan), who is wealthy enough to support Jack—and in turn keep Karen in the extravagant lifestyle to which she is accustomed. Though he is not attracted to Beverley, Jack goes ahead with the scheme because Karen had financially supported him for the whole of their relationship. Karen realizes that she is doing to Jack what her mother did to her, and tells him that she cares more about his happiness than the money. Beverley, who had been in the bathroom, then comes out to an empty bedroom, looks for Jack on the outside balcony and, being 4'11 and 100 lbs., is swept to his death by a gust of wind. Beverley had left his $100 million estate to Jack. He happily becomes the provider in his relationship with Karen, which has otherwise not changed. The series finale shows that—until at least 2028—Karen, Jack, and Rosario share an extravagant penthouse apartment together, and, thanks to plastic surgery, Karen appears to have not aged a day.

When the series was revived in 2017, however, the events of the finale were written off as one of Karen's drug-induced hallucinations. In this continuity, Karen is still married to Stan and still independently wealthy, and has become a member of First Lady Melania Trump's inner circle.

However, in the final two episodes of season 9, it is revealed that Karen and Malcolm go on a rendezvous trip every year. By this point, Malcolm is very tired of having to hide from Stan and pressures Karen into deciding between him and Stan. Though she is reluctant to change their situation and despite both of them being tempted to give in to each other, Karen decides to stay with Stan and she and Malcolm share an awkward goodbye. In the beginning of season 10, Malcolm confesses the affair to Stan in hopes of starting a relationship with Karen again, but when Karen finds out about this, she slaps Malcolm and tells him to leave her alone for good. Karen is then served divorce papers from Stan, and in the next few episodes is seen struggling with her emotions and loneliness. Later in the season, Malcolm reappears at Karen's and Grace's office, hoping to win Karen back, but she is still angry at him and Grace is forced to be a mediator between them. Grace manages to convince Karen to forgive Malcolm and they decide to take things slow. However, when she feels that Malcolm is not putting as much effort into their relationship as she is, she confides her troubles to a lesbian named Nikki (Samira Wiley) who tells her she needs someone to take care of her. They then become lovers and Karen begins to question changing her sexuality. Ultimately in the season 10 finale, she announces herself as straight and breaks things off with Nikki, after realizing how lost she has become since her divorce from Stan.

In the series finale, Stan asks her to take him back, and she realizes that she still loves him. At his direction, she goes to the observation deck of the Statue of Liberty, where they had their first date, but he does not show up. Just as she is about to leave, however, Stan arrives on a helicopter and sends down a note asking her to marry him again. She says yes, and boards the helicopter. That night, she is with Will, Grace, and Jack as Grace goes into labor, and accompanies them to the hospital.

== Other relationships ==
=== Rosario ===
Karen is very close to her maid Rosario Salazar (Shelley Morrison), whom she met and hired in 1985. Although the duo often bicker and fight, it is only part of the bond they share. In the beginning of the series, it seems that Rosario didn't speak much English, and Karen has a hard time communicating with her. Karen's way of giving Rosario orders is to add the letter "o" to the end of every word she says (e.g., "Enougho with the April Fresho. *hangs up the phone* Right now she's calling me a bitcho"). In another example of miscommunication, Karen ends phone calls with Rosario by saying "hola", which means "hello" in Spanish and not "goodbye". When Rosario is first seen on-camera at the end of the first season, it is revealed that she speaks English fluently and that Karen is merely being patronizing. In a later season, we see Karen forced to live in an apartment block she owns in Spanish Harlem as punishment for failing to bring the building to code. She is seen in this episode screeching at a child in the street in fluent Spanish. In the final episode of the first season, Karen arranges for Rosario to marry Jack so she can get a Green Card.

Karen and Rosario have a love-hate relationship: They have frequent, volatile arguments that end with them embracing each other and emotionally declaring their affection for each other. Rosario affectionately calls Karen "mami" from time to time, when they're not trading insults. The only low points occur when Karen loses Rosario in a bet to her nemesis Beverley Leslie and when Karen fires Rosario after discovering she had hidden the truth about Stan being alive. In "Saving Grace, Again (2)" it is suggested that Karen uses Rosario as a horse or at least treats her like one because she asks Jack if "winter white is a good color for Rosario's saddlebag" and in "Cheatin' Trouble Blues", after climbing up numerous flights of stairs, said, "Well, if I'd known we were gonna do all this walking, I would've saddled up Rosario, like when we go to Greece!"

In the 2017 revived series, Rosario dies of a heart attack. Karen keeps up an uncaring façade for days afterward, even as she arranges a funeral for her, as well as the quinceañera she never had. She loses her nerve and flees the funeral before it starts, drowning her sorrows at a nearby bar. However, she does bid Rosario a quietly emotional goodbye when she is alone with the casket, and tells her she was her best friend, and that she loves her, tearfully declaring "te amo mami".

=== Gin ===
Karen has a sister named Gin, played by Bernadette Peters. According to Gin, Karen rigged a floorboard during a game of Twister so she would fall through, hurt herself, and end her career in dance. Gin always mentions how one of her legs is now shorter than the other due to the incident. Later, Gin admits she rigged the floorboard as a cry for attention.

=== Lois Whitley ===
Lois, played by Suzanne Pleshette, is Karen's mother who appears in the episode "Someone Old, Someplace New". Jack is making a movie called The Mystery of Karen Walker and while making the movie he meets Lois. At the end of the episode Karen and Lois see each other for the first time in many years. Karen says "I told you I never wanted to see you again." It is later revealed that Lois made a living as a con artist during Karen's childhood and adolescence, implicating Karen in many of her schemes. As a result of this unconventional upbringing, Karen decided to distance herself from her mother, presumably in an attempt to lead a more stable life. However, the fruit does not fall far from the tree, as Karen's long, colorful history of multiple marriages and desire to "throw the feds off" proves. They forgive each other in the next episode, "Something Borrowed, Someone's Due", but Lois wants to do one last job: conning an elderly shut-in out of his fortune. Karen would appear to be a down-on-her-luck daughter who is so "slow" that she was a cheerleader who never stopped clapping. While doing this Karen makes Lois sign a paper saying she will never pull another con with Karen again, and Karen notarizes it; she reveals that she is a legal notary from a Chicago job they once pulled. The job fails when the old man's daughter gets a restraining order against Lois; then Lois and Karen make amends.

=== Other rivals ===
Karen's arch rivals include, but are not limited to, Beverley Leslie (Leslie Jordan), Lorraine Finster (Minnie Driver), Anita Bryant, Candice Bergen (who is also Karen's best friend, referring to running into her at a restaurant as "a nightmare-slash-delightful"), and Marlo Thomas (Karen hates her, but likes her husband, Phil Donahue). Further enemies include Scott Woolley (Jeff Goldblum), whom she jilted in high school; Candace "Candy" Pruitt (Christine Ebersole), who once said that Karen's voice sounded "like someone strangling an old macaw"; and Helena Barnes (Joan Collins), a famous interior designer. Karen often openly insults or ridicules her enemies, while simultaneously thinking of them as her friends. Karen has a tendency to stumble upon becoming aware of her physical proximity to certain rivals. The most notable occurrence of this physical reaction occurs during her encounters with Beverley Leslie.

== Personality ==
With other staff and help, Karen is deliberately patronizing, referring to them solely by their title both in conversation and to their faces: "Driver", "Butler", "Private Detective", "Pharmacist", "Back-Up Pharmacist", et cetera, and even refers to Will as "Lawyer" on occasion. She does this even when they are doing other jobs ("Cook sometimes cleans, Cleaner sometimes cooks, Driver sometimes provides an alibi ..."). This rude tone is not just limited to her employees, as she looks down on or openly mocks most people she meets, even her friends. Karen is often cruel to her staff at home, training them to run when she enters a room. Other times, she berates them, but somehow this comes across as an act of affection.

While being patronizing and condescending most of the time, Karen also seems to respect those that won't back down from her. When she first meets Rosario, she bickers with her after Rosario told her that no one wants to hear her whining, only to say she likes Rosario and tells her she wants her to work for her. On another occasion, she asks Ben Ducette's assistant Mrs. Freeman to pop a stamp on a letter and put it into the mail for her, only to receive a very icy look in return without touching the envelope or replying to her. After an uncomfortable pause for Will and Ben, Karen takes back the envelope and genuinely tells her she likes her.

Sometimes Karen unintentionally reveals to her friends a softer side. In one such incident, Karen's husband has an apparent heart attack. Karen discovers that her friends have placed a bet to see who can get her to cry first, so she punishes each of them by leading them on to think she might break down in their presence. In the end, it is revealed that it was not a heart attack but rather acute angina. She then has an emotional breakdown over the incident, during which Grace stumbles in and consoles her. Another episode sees Karen and Jack in her mansion with her refusing to let him enter 'the forbidden room'. When Jack finally gains access he discovers it is a nursery which Karen had prepared during a pregnancy scare in an earlier season. Although she agrees to change the room into a liquor storage room, she quickly changes her mind and the audience sees her stony façade crumble.

In one episode, Jack accidentally gives away her favorite shoes to charity, and she rushes to buy them back, only to find that a poor woman is about to buy them. Karen gives the woman $500 for the shoes and admonishes Jack not to tell anyone.

== Sexuality and gender ==
Karen frequently implies that she's attracted to other women, and has hinted that she has slept with members of the same sex. She makes frequent references to Grace being secretly attracted to her, and once considered marrying Martina Navratilova during the 1980s. During the original series, she has made advances towards multiple women, including one woman named Diane who seemed open to the idea. In the 10th season, she enters a lesbian relationship with a woman named Nikki (Samira Wiley), but ends it upon realizing that she is not really a lesbian, but is simply feeling lost. In the first episode of season 11, Karen mentions to Will that she considers herself pansexual, despite deciding that she was straight in the season 10 finale.

== After Will and Grace ==
Walker's persona has appeared in advertisements for The Megan Mullally Show, which debuted in September 2006 and canceled in January 2007. In one of the advertisements, "Karen" asks Mullally to take her along, and in another, Karen tries to pass for Mullally at a meeting with studio executives until she is caught by Mullally and they begin to physically struggle with each other. Mullally once again donned a Walker persona in an episode of The Megan Mullally Show which featured Andy Dick. In September 2016, just over a decade after the Will & Grace series finale had first aired, Mullally appeared in a 10-minute Will & Grace webisode as Karen, alongside Eric McCormack (Will), Debra Messing (Grace), Sean Hayes (Jack), and Shelley Morrison (Rosario). In the webisode, Karen announces that she is going to vote for Donald Trump in the presidential election, much to the chagrin of the other characters.

=== Karen: The Musical ===
In 2009, Mullally announced that she was developing a Broadway musical entitled Karen: The Musical, which was to be the "return of Karen Walker". However, when the project was brought up during a 2013 interview, Mullally revealed that it had been abandoned after she lost the rights to the Karen Walker character.
