= Jack McFarland =

Fictional character from Will and Grace

- Will & Grace character
- Sean Hayes as Jack McFarland in Will & Grace
- First appearance: "Pilot" (episode 1.01)
- Last appearance: "It's Time" (episode 11.18)
- Created by: Max Mutchnick
- Portrayed by: Sean Hayes

In-universe information
- Full name: John Philip McFarland
- Nicknames: Jackie (by Karen); Poodle (by Karen); Just Jack; Jack 2000; Judy; Mo; Dorothy; Mary
- Gender: Male
- Occupation: Current: Actor; Acting coach and teacher; Cater waiter; Choreographer; Dancer; Singer; Former: Junior executive (Out TV; Seasons 7–8); Sales clerk (Barney's New York; Season 4); Nurse
- Family: Joe Black (biological father; deceased); Judith McFarland (mother); Daniel McFarland (legal father/stepfather); Elliot (son); Skip (grandson)
- Spouses: Rosario Salazar (ex-wife); Estéfan Gloria (husband)
- Children: Elliot (son, with Bonnie via IVF)

John Philip "Jack" McFarland is a fictional character on the American television sitcom Will & Grace, played by Sean Hayes.

== Character overview ==
Jack is Will Truman's (Eric McCormack) best friend in the American television sitcom Will & Grace. In the show, Jack is considered a "camp" gay man. He is very mercurial and changes careers rapidly from cater waiter, Banana Republic and Barneys New York sales clerk, to acting teacher, to student nurse, to surfer, and to back-up dancer for Jennifer Lopez and Janet Jackson. This and Jack’s irresponsibility with money often forces him to rely on Will or Karen to take care of him financially.

Although Jack considers all his relationships serious, he is actually a notorious serial dater who “falls in love” with any man he becomes attracted to only to move on shortly after having sex with them. His only romantic relationship that’s lasted longer than a few weeks (with Stuart, a client of Will's played by Dave Foley), and even that one ended as a result of Jack's cheating.

Jack's is unashamedly vain and self-absorbed, and adores all gay icons, particularly Cher, of whom he has a rare doll. According to Will, he has the best gaydar in the tristate area. He is a fan of Buffy the Vampire Slayer, particularly lesbian character Willow Rosenberg. He also collects clippings of celebrities' hair, including a complete collection from the four main actresses on The Golden Girls, as well as Broadway icons Bernadette Peters, Betty Buckley, Idina Menzel, and – as of season seven — Patti LuPone. Jack also stalks actor Kevin Bacon, briefly becoming the actor's assistant.

He believes in gay rights, and is an LGBTQ advocate, but tends to lend his support to shallow causes, such as protesting NBC censoring a gay kiss on a television show ("What about our Constitutional right to see two hotties get it on?"). Even though his character has flaws, in the end his intentions are essentially good and this can be seen as the story progress throughout the seasons.

== Character history ==
Jack was born February 16, 1969, and was raised by his mother Judith (Veronica Cartwright) and stepfather Daniel (Beau Bridges). He also had a babysitter named Sissy (played in one episode by Demi Moore). His mother did not know he was gay, and his stepfather was not close to him. He claims to have come out as early as preschool. While he was in high school, Jack befriended Will and helped him come to terms with his sexuality. They have been best friends ever since.

Since the first season, Jack has established a close bond with alcoholic socialite Karen Walker (Megan Mullally), who works as Grace's secretary. Karen is his closest female friend, and they bond due to their shared narcissism and materialism. Jack also strikes up a friendship with Will's other best friend Grace Adler (Debra Messing), through association with Will and Karen.

In the pilot episode, Jack is living with Will while his floors are re-done, but has to find elsewhere to live when Grace moves in. At the end of season one, Jack agrees to marry Karen's maid Rosario (Shelley Morrison) to secure her green card. Jack lives with Karen for the entirety of season two, but after a year together, the marriage is annulled when Rosario wants to marry Karen's gardener. Therefore, at the end of season two, Jack moves in with Will, but when Will takes Grace in after an attempted burglary at her apartment, Jack agrees to sublet Grace's apartment — although Will, Karen, and his mother pay the rent. (In "Moveable Feast Part 1," it emerged that each of the three pays one half of the cost, meaning that Jack is actually collecting one and a half times the actual amount of his rent.)

In season three, Jack undertakes a search for his biological father, which ends when he discovers that his father died several years back. Jack does, however, meet Elliot (Michael Angarano), his own biological son, whom he fathered by depositing at a sperm bank as a teenager so that he could buy a leather jacket. He later discovers that the boy's mother Bonnie (Rosie O'Donnell) is a lesbian; she was a nurse at the sperm bank who stole Jack's deposit and was inseminated with it.

Jack's most consistent vocation results from his taking over the class of his acting teacher Zandra (Eileen Brennan) after she is fed up with his lack of talent. After taking everyone's money and leaving, another student (Stacy Keach) takes over the class and begins teaching the "McFarland method" ("acting is attracting") without Jack's knowledge. He also trains to be a student nurse, but ultimately gives it up when, during Karen's fourth wedding, he meets Jennifer Lopez and becomes her back-up dancer (and, for a short time, Janet Jackson's back-up dancer), a career that fizzles as well.

In the seventh season, Jack embarks on a proper career as a producer for OutTV, a new gay television network. By season's end, his profile rises to the point that he is given a talk show of his own to host. In season eight, however, Jack loses his job at the network after he speaks out against the new right-wing ownership of the show, which has given him a conservative co-host named Amber Louise (Britney Spears). He has a hard time finding work, and out of desperation auditions for a minor role on a television show. Feeling depressed and rejected at the time, he displays real emotion instead of his usual over-dramatic acting style, and ends up getting the lead role of Chuck Rafferty, a straight, alcoholic, womanizing cop.

In the series finale, Jack is forced into a relationship with Karen's nemesis Beverley Leslie (Leslie Jordan); Karen, who has recently lost all of her money, demands that he take up with the obnoxious millionaire so he can inherit Leslie's fortune and keep her in the lifestyle to which she is accustomed. Eventually Karen realizes that she is doing to Jack what her mother did to her, and tells him that she cares more about his happiness than the money. When Beverley dies after being swept off his balcony by a gust of wind, Jack is left with his money, which he shares with Karen. A flash forward reveals that, 16 years later, Jack and Karen are still living together.

When the series was revived in 2017, however, the events of the finale were retconned. In the new continuity, Jack was never engaged to Beverly Leslie, is not rich, is still living across the hall from Will and Grace, and is still pursuing an acting career while throwing himself at every available man in sight. During the ninth season, he takes up a part-time job as rehearsal pianist and acting teacher at the Bronx Boys and Girls Club. In the 11th season, he takes over as owner and manager of Cleo's, a legendary New York gay bar.

In the series finale, Jack is cast in a Broadway show as a "fifth understudy", and finally achieves his dream of appearing on the Great White Way when the original actor and all four other understudies call in sick. In the final scene, he goes with Will, Grace, and Karen to the hospital when Grace goes into labor.

== Relationships ==
=== Romantic relationships ===
Jack is known for his several various flings throughout the show. Most of them are mentioned but not shown, and Jack never seems to take any of them seriously or settle down with anyone for very long. Jack's longest relationship is with Stuart Lamarack (Dave Foley), which lasts several months during the sixth season, until Jack cheats on him. During the ninth season, Jack enters into a relationship with Drew (Ryan Pinkston) after realising he fears growing old and lonely. Drew later abruptly breaks up with Jack after two months, claiming he is not ready for a committed relationship and wants to see other people, which devastates Jack as he realises he is now ready to settle down with someone. In the ninth season finale, he instantly goes on a rebound fling and quickly gets engaged to Estéfan Gloria (Brian Jordan Alvarez), a man he met on said rebound vacation. While Jack at first struggles with the idea of a lifelong commitment, he finally realizes that he loves Estéfan, and marries him in the 10th season finale.

=== Will ===
The episode "Lows in the Mid-Eighties" reveals that Jack met Will at a party in 1985 and realized immediately that he was gay. After Will comes out of the closet, he and Jack become best friends, with Jack helping Will navigate life as an openly gay man.

While they care deeply for each other, however, Jack and Will fight and make fun of each other constantly. Jack often calls Will "bald and fat" (which he clearly isn't), while Will makes fun of Jack's promiscuity, shallowness, and perpetual unemployment. Nevertheless, Will pays virtually all of Jack's bills, including half his rent (with Karen and Jack's mother also paying half each).

Several episodes suggest that Jack has feelings for Will. In "Lows in the Mid-Eighties," he confesses his love to Will, but tries to pass it off as a 'test of friendship' when Will doesn't feel the same. He has a similar reaction in an eighth-season episode when Will's boyfriend James (Taye Diggs) accuses him of being jealous of their relationship.

=== Karen ===
Jack and Karen meet in the second episode of the first season, and become instant best friends. Karen calls Jack "poodle" and he calls Karen “Kare Bear” as well as sometimes entering a room asking Karen “Who’s Your Daddy” and she responds “You are.” Karen lavishes him with gifts and attention, while also paying half Jack’s rent. They also provide each other with emotional support (in their own self-absorbed fashion), with Karen defending him from people who treat him unkindly and Jack giving her a shoulder to cry on when her marriage falls apart.

In the series finale, Jack reluctantly moves in Karen's nemesis Beverley Leslie to provide for a newly bankrupt Karen. However, Karen realizes that she doesn't want him to make a mistake and stops him from marrying Beverley. After Beverley dies, Jack inherits his money, and he and Karen live together in luxury for the rest of their lives. The 2017 revival retcons these events as one of Karen's drug-induced hallucinations, though Karen does not tell Jack about what happened to him in this dream. Eric McCormack has referred to Jack and Karen as the “fun house mirror reflection of Will and Grace”.

=== Grace ===
Jack and Grace initially dislike each other, seeing each other as competition for Will's attention. Eventually, they bond over their shared love of ice skating. For the remainder of the series, they are good friends, although they make fun of each other constantly.

=== Elliot ===
In the third season, Jack finds out that he has a son, Elliot (Michael Angarano), conceived through in vitro fertilization using sperm that Jack donated to a sperm bank years before. Jack initially has trouble adjusting to fatherhood, especially since Elliot's mother Bonnie (Rosie O'Donnell) dislikes him. Eventually, however, Jack realizes that he loves Elliot and commits (in his own way) to being a good father.

In the revived series, Jack and Elliot have been estranged for several years. Jack learns that Elliot has a son, Skip, who is presumed to be gay. He is horrified to learn that Elliot and his wife are sending Skip to "hetero camp", and follows the boy there to tell him that there is nothing wrong with him. Elliot realizes the error of his ways and invites Jack into his family.

== Reception ==
The character has gained a mixed reception from critics for perpetuating gay stereotypes. Nevertheless, Hayes won a Primetime Emmy Award for Outstanding Supporting Actor in a Comedy Series in 2000 for his performance.
