= List of Ugly Betty episodes =

This is an episode listing for the comedy drama TV series Ugly Betty. The show premiered on September 28, 2006 on ABC in the United States and ended its run on April 14, 2010 after 85 episodes.

== Series overview ==
Season	Episodes	Originally released	
Season	Episodes	First released	Last released
1	23	September 28, 2006	May 17, 2007
2	18	September 27, 2007	May 22, 2008
3	24	September 25, 2008	May 21, 2009
4	20	October 16, 2009	April 14, 2010

== Episodes ==
=== Season 1 (2006–07) ===
No. overall	No. in season	Title	Directed by	Written by	Original release date	U.S. viewers (millions)
1	1	"Pilot"	Richard Shepard	Silvio Horta	September 28, 2006	16.32
2	2	"The Box and the Bunny"	Sheree Folkson	Silvio Horta	October 5, 2006	14.26
3	3	"Queens for a Day"	James Hayman	Marco Pennette	October 12, 2006	13.95
4	4	"Fey's Sleigh Ride"	Tricia Brock	Sheila Lawrence	October 19, 2006	13.17
5	5	"The Lyin', the Watch and the Wardrobe"	Rodman Flender	Donald Todd	October 26, 2006	13.14
6	6	"Trust, Lust, and Must"	Jamie Babbit	Cameron Litvack	November 2, 2006	13.62
7	7	"After Hours"	James Hayman	Dailyn Rodriguez	November 9, 2006	12.81
8	8	"Four Thanksgivings and a Funeral"	Sarah Pia Anderson	Marco Pennette	November 16, 2006	12.95
9	9	"Lose the Boss"	Ken Whittingham	Oliver Goldstick	November 23, 2006	8.74
10	10	"Fake Plastic Snow"	James Hayman	Veronica Becker & Sarah Kucserka	November 30, 2006	13.02
11	11	"Swag"	Tamra Davis	James D. Parriott	January 4, 2007	11.65
12	12	"Sofia's Choice"	James Hayman	Silvio Horta	January 11, 2007	13.49
13	13	"In or Out"	Michael Spiller	Myra Jo Martino	January 18, 2007	14.10
14	14	"I'm Coming Out"	Wendey Stanzler	James D. Parriott	February 1, 2007	14.00
15	15	"Brothers"	Lev L. Spiro	Shelia Lawrence	February 8, 2007	14.27
16	16	"Derailed"	James Hayman	Cameron Litvack	February 15, 2007	13.66
17	17	"Icing on the Cake"	Jeff Melman	Dailyn Rodriguez	March 15, 2007	10.80
18	18	"Don't Ask, Don't Tell"	Tricia Brock	Sarah Kucserka, Veronica Becker & Marco Pennette	March 22, 2007	10.41
19	19	"Punch Out"	Miguel Arteta	Oliver Goldstick	April 19, 2007	9.46
20	20	"Petra-Gate"	Paul Lazarus	Harry Werksman & Gabrielle Stanton	April 26, 2007	9.62
21	21	"Secretaries' Day"	Victor Nelli, Jr.	Henry Alonso Myers	May 3, 2007	10.68
22	22	"A Tree Grows in Guadalajara"	Lev L. Spiro	Tracy Poust & Jon Kinnally	May 10, 2007	9.63
23	23	"East Side Story"	James Hayman	Silvio Horta & Marco Pennette	May 17, 2007	10.50

Notes:

- "Swag" was originally scheduled to be aired as the 4th episode, but was moved to 11th by the network. The change resulted in a number of continuity problems, which were "fixed" by making most of the episode a flashback and adding scenes with Betty telling Christina the bulk of the story. In Italy, Denmark, Spain, India and the Philippines, the episode is retained as the 4th episode.
- On the season 1 DVD box set, "Swag" is listed as episode 4, without the scenes of Betty talking to Christina in a flashback. Other noticeable changes on the DVD were the reversed order of the show's episode chronology: "The Box and the Bunny", which is the second episode, is listed as the third episode, having swapped places with "Queens for a Day". However, "The Box and the Bunny" should be the second episode.

=== Season 2 (2007–08) ===
No. overall	No. in season	Title	Directed by	Written by	Original release date	U.S. viewers (millions)
24	1	"How Betty Got Her Grieve Back"	James Hayman	Silvio Horta & Marco Pennette	September 27, 2007	11.16
25	2	"Family/Affair"	Victor Nelli, Jr.	Bill Wrubel	October 4, 2007	9.78
26	3	"Betty's Wait Problem"	Tricia Brock	Jon Kinnally & Tracy Poust	October 11, 2007	10.35
27	4	"Grin and Bear It"	Tucker Gates	Sarah Kucserka & Veronica Becker	October 18, 2007	9.67
28	5	"A League of Their Own"	Wendey Stanzler	Sheila Lawrence	October 25, 2007	9.84
29	6	"Something Wicked This Way Comes"	Wendey Stanzler	Henry Alonso Myers	November 1, 2007	9.90
30	7	"A Nice Day for a Posh Wedding"	James Hayman	Silvio Horta & Marco Pennette	November 8, 2007	10.89
31	8	"I See Me, I.C.U."	Rodman Flender	Bill Wrubel	November 15, 2007	10.73
32	9	"Giving Up the Ghost"	Gary Winick	Charles Pratt, Jr.	November 22, 2007	7.49
33	10	"Bananas for Betty"	Michael Spiller	Jon Kinnally & Tracy Poust	December 6, 2007	9.34
34	11	"Zero Worship"	Ron Underwood	Dawn DeKeyser	January 10, 2008	9.89
35	12	"Odor in the Court"	Victor Nelli, Jr.	Bill Wrubel	January 17, 2008	9.52
36	13	"A Thousand Words Before Friday"	Matt Shakman	Sheila Lawrence & Henry Alonso Myers	January 24, 2008	8.92
37	14	"Twenty Four Candles"	Michael Spiller	Sarah Kucserka & Veronica Becker	April 24, 2008	8.52
38	15	"Burning Questions"	Matt Shakman	Henry Alonso Myers	May 1, 2008	7.93
39	16	"Betty's Baby Bump"	Linda Mendoza	Story by : Dawn DeKeyser; Teleplay by : Bill Wrubel	May 8, 2008	7.99
40	17	"The Kids Are Alright"	Wendey Stanzler	Brian Tanen	May 15, 2008	8.47
41	18	"Jump"	Victor Nelli, Jr.	Silvio Horta	May 22, 2008	8.75

Notes:

- Season 2 was originally slated to have a total of 24 episodes, but due to the Writers Guild of America strike, it had 18 episodes with the last five written and produced following the strike's end.

=== Season 3 (2008–09) ===
No. overall	No. in season	Title	Directed by	Written by	Original release date	U.S. viewers (millions)
42	1	"The Manhattan Project"	Victor Nelli, Jr.	Silvio Horta	September 25, 2008	9.77
43	2	"Filing for the Enemy"	Michael Spiller	Joel Fields	October 2, 2008	8.58
44	3	"Crimes of Fashion"	Victor Nelli, Jr.	Henry Alonso Myers	October 9, 2008	8.48
45	4	"Betty Suarez Land"	Michael Spiller	Chris Black	October 16, 2008	8.21
46	5	"Granny Pants"	Fred Savage	Sheila Lawrence	October 23, 2008	8.66
47	6	"Ugly Berry"	Ron Underwood	Bill Wrubel	October 30, 2008	8.55
48	7	"Crush'd"	Victor Nelli, Jr.	Tracy Poust & Jon Kinnally	November 6, 2008	8.95
49	8	"Tornado Girl"	John Terlesky	Peter Elkoff	November 13, 2008	9.20
50	9	"When Betty Met YETI"	Victor Nelli, Jr.	Brian Tanen	November 20, 2008	8.30
51	10	"Bad Amanda"	John Putch	Chris Black	December 4, 2008	8.47
52	11	"Dress for Success"	Matt Shakman	Cara DiPaolo	January 8, 2009	7.51
53	12	"Sisters on the Verge of a Nervous Breakdown"	Lee Shallat-Chemel	Henry Alonso Myers	January 22, 2009	7.54
54	13	"Kissed Off"	Rose Troche	David Grubstick	February 5, 2009	7.27
55	14	"The Courtship of Betty's Father"	John Terlesky	Peter Elkoff	February 12, 2009	7.44
56	15	"There's No Place Like Mode"	Bethany Rooney	Sheila Lawrence	February 19, 2009	7.65
57	16	"Things Fall Apart"	Tom Verica	Henry Alonso Myers	February 26, 2009	6.78
58	17	"Sugar Daddy"	David Warren	Brian Tanen	March 5, 2009	6.35
59	18	"A Mother of a Problem"	Matthew Diamond	Bill Wrubel	March 12, 2009	7.21
60	19	"The Sex Issue"	Victor Nelli, Jr.	Cara DiPaolo	March 19, 2009	7.82
61	20	"Rabbit Test"	Richard Heus	Chris Black	April 30, 2009	6.81
62	21	"The Born Identity"	John Terlesky	Steven Ross	May 7, 2009	7.49
63	22	"In the Stars"	Paul Holahan	Sheila Lawrence	May 14, 2009	6.83
64	23	"Curveball"	Victor Nelli, Jr.	Tracy Poust & Jon Kinnally	May 21, 2009	6.16
65	24	"The Fall Issue"	Tom Verica	Silvio Horta	May 21, 2009	6.37

Notes:

- ABC placed Ugly Betty on a temporary hiatus after the March 19, 2009 episode to air Samantha Who? and In the Motherhood in the 8-9PM E/P slot, but returned it after the shows complete their runs. Ugly Betty returned on April 30, 2009 to finish its 3rd season, ending with a 2-hour season finale airing on May 21, 2009.

=== Season 4 (2009–10) ===
No. overall	No. in season	Title	Directed by	Written by	Original release date	U.S. viewers (millions)
66	1	"The Butterfly Effect (Part 1)"	John Terlesky	Sheila Lawrence & Henry Alonso Myers	October 16, 2009	5.01
67	2	"The Butterfly Effect (Part 2)"	Victor Nelli, Jr.	Sheila Lawrence & Henry Alonso Myers	October 16, 2009	5.18
68	3	"Blue on Blue"	Victor Nelli, Jr	Abraham Higginbotham	October 23, 2009	4.55
69	4	"The Weiner, the Bun, and the Boob"	Wendey Stanzler	Brian Tanen	October 30, 2009	4.50
70	5	"Plus None"	Paul Holahan	Cara DiPaolo	November 6, 2009	4.76
71	6	"Backseat Betty"	John Putch	Tracy Poust & Jon Kinnally	November 13, 2009	4.46
72	7	"Level (7) with Me"	John Fortenberry	Chris Black	November 27, 2009	3.39
73	8	"The Bahamas Triangle"	Victor Neili, Jr.	Sheila Lawrence	December 4, 2009	4.23
74	9	"Be-Shure"	David Dworetzky	Gail Lerner	December 11, 2009	4.80
75	10	"The Passion of the Betty"	S.J. Clarkson	David Grubstick & Chris Black	January 6, 2010	5.13
76	11	"Back in Her Place"	Richard Heus	Abraham Higginbotham	January 13, 2010	4.67
77	12	"Blackout!"	John Putch	Cara DiPaolo	January 20, 2010	4.59
78	13	"Chica and the Man"	Victor Nelli, Jr.	Gail Lerner	February 3, 2010	4.34
79	14	"Smokin' Hot"	John Scott	Brian Tanen	February 10, 2010	4.68
80	15	"Fire and Nice"	John Terlesky	Erika Johnson	March 10, 2010	4.10
81	16	"All the World's a Stage"	Andy Wolk	Abraham Higginbotham & David Grubstick	March 17, 2010	3.33
82	17	"Million Dollar Smile"	Paul Holahan	Henry Alonso Myers & Chris Black	March 24, 2010	4.56
83	18	"London Calling"	Mark Worthington	David Grubstick & Sheila Lawrence	March 31, 2010	4.01
84	19	"The Past Presents the Future"	Paul Holahan	Jon Kinnaly & Tracy Poust	April 7, 2010	4.03
85	20	"Hello Goodbye"	Victor Nelli Jr.	Silvio Horta	April 14, 2010	5.43

Notes:

- Episodes 66–74 aired on Fridays (October 16, 2009 – December 11, 2009).
- Episodes 75–85 aired on Wednesdays (January 6, 2010 – April 14, 2010).
- Season 4 was originally slated to have a total of 22 episodes but was reduced to 20 episodes.

== Mode After Hours episodes ==
=== Season 1 (2008) ===
#	Title	Director	Writer(s)	Original airdate
1 (1)	"Gwadalaharahh"	Max Yoffe	Veronica Becker & Sarah Kucserka	September 18, 2008
Alone in the office, Marc and Amanda start dressing up and imitating Betty and Daniel – with unexpected results!
2 (2)	"The Friend-iversary VLOG"	Richard Heus	Brian Tanen & David Grubstick	September 25, 2008
Amanda makes a blog about an egg-salad and a salami, thus forgetting about her friend-iversary with Marc.
3 (3)	"Bowling for Cliff"	Richard Heus	Brian Tanen & David Grubstick	October 2, 2008
Amanda teaches Marc how to bowl before his bowling date with Cliff.
4 (4)	"Slumber Party Secrets"	Richard Heus	Brian Tanen & David Grubstick	October 9, 2008
Amanda and Marc sleep at Mode, and share some of their secrets.
5 (5)	"Sommers Seance"	Richard Heus	Brian Tanen & David Grubstick	October 16, 2008
Marc and Amanda organize a seance trying to contact her dead mother Fey.
6 (6)	"Trapped in the Elevator"	Max Yoffe	Veronica Becker & Sarah Kucserka	October 23, 2008
Amanda and Marc get locked in the Mode elevator and share their darkest secrets.

=== Season 2 (2008–09) ===
Season 2 initially included 6 episodes but an Amazon-exclusive 7th episode was subsequently added.

#	Title	Director	Writer(s)	Original airdate
1 (7)	"Big Package"	Richard Heus	Michael Russo	October 30, 2008
Marc and Amanda have their own Christmas with unopened and undelivered office packages.
2 (8)	"April Fools"	Richard Heus	Casey Fisher	March 16, 2009
Marc and Amanda think of clever ways to trick Betty on April Fool's Day.
3 (9)	"Roller Girlz"	Richard Heus	Casey Fisher	March 23, 2009
Marc teaches Amanda how to skate in order to lose weight.
4 (10)	"Breaking the Band"	Richard Heus	Michael Russo	March 30, 2009
Marc and Amanda compete to sing at a local karaoke bar.
5 (11)	"London Calling"	Richard Heus	Brian Tanen	April 6, 2009
Marc and Amanda call the Mode UK office for a YETI assignment and end up finding their British counterparts.
6 (12)	"When Marc Met Mandy"	Richard Heus	David Grubstick & Brian Tanen	April 13, 2009
Marc and Amanda flash back to the first time they ever met.
7 (13)	"I Spy"	Richard Heus	David Grubstick & Brian Tanen	April 20, 2009
Marc cancels dinner plans with Amanda to spy on his crush, Jake.

=== Season 3 (2009) ===
#	Title	Director	Writer(s)	Original airdate
1 (14)	"Always a Bridesmaid"	Richard Heus	David Grubstick	September 26, 2009
Marc helps Amanda with her dream wedding at Mode offices.
2 (15)	"Harassment of a Sexual Nature"	Jim Klever-Weis	David Grubstick	October 3, 2009
Marc and Amanda work out scenarios from sexual harassment in the workplace training.
3 (16)	"A Vlog to Remember"	Richard Heus	Erika Johnson	October 10, 2009
Marc and Amanda attempt to make a vlog of their own in response of the one by Meade Security
4 (17)	"Role Playing"	Jim Klever-Weis	David Grubstick	October 17, 2009
Amanda asks Marc to plead with Wilhelmina for a promotion and raise.
5 (18)	"Queenseeker"	Jude Gorjanc	Casey Fisher	October 24, 2009
Amanda creates a profile for Marc on an online dating service.
6 (19)	"Stress-Orcism"	Mark Worthington	Michael Russo	October 31, 2009
Amanda tries out her workplace stress relief techniques on Marc.
