= Ugly Betty season 1 =

First season of the American television series

Ugly Betty
- Season 1
- Promotional poster
- No. of episodes: 23

Release
- Original network: ABC
- Original release: September 28, 2006 – May 17, 2007

Season chronology
- Next → Season 2

The first season of the American dramedy television series Ugly Betty began airing on September 28, 2006 and concluded on May 17, 2007.

In addition to the twenty-three regular episodes in season one, a special, "The Beautiful World of Ugly Betty", was aired on April 12, 2007. Another special, which was a half-hour update recapping the first ten episodes, aired during the month of January 2007 on local ABC affiliates and various cable networks.

== Cast ==
For the first season of Ugly Betty, nine characters were initially included in the main cast.

Michael Urie and Kevin Sussman were originally credited as Special Guest Stars but were upgraded to regulars in episode 14. Although Sussman's character was written out almost immediately after, in episode 15, he was credited as a regular for the rest of the season.

Rebecca Romijn was added to the show’s main cast in episode 13, after her character was initially played by (a heavily disguised) Elizabeth Payne.

=== Main cast ===
- America Ferrera as Betty Suarez
- Eric Mabius as Daniel Meade
- Alan Dale as Bradford Meade
- Tony Plana as Ignacio Suarez
- Ana Ortiz as Hilda Suarez
- Ashley Jensen as Christina McKinney
- Becki Newton as Amanda Tanen
- Mark Indelicato as Justin Suarez
- Vanessa L. Williams as Wilhelmina Slater
- Michael Urie as Marc St. James
- Kevin Sussman as Walter
- Rebecca Romijn as Alexis Meade (episode 13–23)

=== Recurring cast ===
- Kevin Alejandro as Santos
- Bailey Chase as Beckett 'Becks' Scott
- Brett Cullen as Ted LeBeau
- Ava Gaudet as Gina Gambarro
- Gina Gershon as Fabia
- Christopher Gorham as Henry Grubstick
- Max Greenfield as Nick Pepper
- Salma Hayek as Sofia Reyes
- Jowharah Jones as Nico Slater
- Judith Light as Claire Meade
- Jayma Mays as Charlie
- Elizabeth Payne as the Masked Lady
- Stelio Savante as Steve
- Octavia Spencer as Constance Grady

=== Guest cast ===
- Kristin Chenoweth as Diane
- Jesse Tyler Ferguson as Dr. Gabe Farkus
- Cristián de la Fuente as Rodrigo Veloso
- Rebecca Gayheart as Jordan Dunn
- Kathy Griffin as a Fashion TV Host
- Tim Gunn as a Fashion TV Reporter
- Leslie Jordan as Quincy Combs
- Lucy Liu as Grace Chin
- Patti LuPone as Mrs. Jean Weiner
- Debi Mazar as Leah Feldman
- AnnaLynne McCord as Petra
- Ivana Milicevic as Lena
- Rita Moreno as Aunt Mirta
- Jerry O’Connell as Joel
- Teddy Sears as Hunter
- Liz Torres as Evelyn
- Lorraine Toussaint as Amelia ‘Yoga’ Bluman
- Angélica Vale as Angelica

The first season also saw Katharine McPhee and Martha Stewart make cameo appearances as themselves.

== Episodes ==
No. overall	No. in season	Title	Directed by	Written by	Original release date	U.S. viewers (millions)
1	1	"Pilot"	Richard Shepard	Silvio Horta	September 28, 2006	16.32
Betty lands a job as an assistant at a fashion magazine, but her employer wants to make sure her first week on the job will be her last.
2	2	"The Box and the Bunny"	Sheree Folkson	Silvio Horta	October 5, 2006	14.26
Betty must find the mock-up of the magazine cover featuring a movie star; Bradford becomes more interested in the private life of the supposedly deceased Fey.
3	3	"Queens for a Day"	James Hayman	Marco Pennette	October 12, 2006	13.95
Betty uses her Queens connections to lure an in-demand photographer for a series of shoots; Bradford seeks out the car that killed Fey; Wilhelmina prepares for a big date.
4	4	"Fey's Sleigh Ride"	Tricia Brock	Sheila Lawrence	October 19, 2006	13.17
Betty reluctantly teams up with Marc and Amanda to find out who leaked the ideas for a Christmas photo shoot to a rival magazine; Daniel and Wilhelmina are forced to pair up in order to beat the magazine's deadline; Justin visits MODE for a school project.
5	5	"The Lyin', the Watch and the Wardrobe"	Rodman Flender	Donald Todd	October 26, 2006	13.14
Betty is the only one in the office to dress for Halloween; Wilhelmina tries to squeeze into a dress that doesn't fit her; Daniel visits his mother and questions his father about his affair with Fey.
6	6	"Trust, Lust, and Must"	Jamie Babbit	Cameron Litvack	November 2, 2006	13.62
After Daniel falls in lust with a beauty in the MODE lobby (played by Salma Hayek in the first of a seven-episode arc), he asks Betty to find out who the mysterious woman is. In the meantime, Wilhelmina has to deal with the strong character of her daughter after she comes home from boarding school, while Betty and Hilda get unexpected news as the sisters try to raise cash for a special cause.
7	7	"After Hours"	James Hayman	Dailyn Rodriguez	November 9, 2006	12.81
Betty takes a break from her escalating family troubles when she's assigned to review a posh new hotel. Meanwhile, Daniel is dismayed when Sofia Reyes and her team take up residence in the MODE conference room, and Wilhelmina prepares to go a little bit country to woo a mega rich Texan to advertise his stores in MODE.
8	8	"Four Thanksgivings and a Funeral"	Sarah Pia Anderson	Marco Pennette	November 16, 2006	12.95
Daniel, to his dismay, must attend his family's Thanksgiving gathering at the Country Club along with Claire (who was just released from the institution), Bradford. ..and Sofia. Amanda and Marc decide to create their own festive gatherings at MODE. There is also a dinner at The Suarezs', where Santos, Justin's father, will be in attendance as he brings gifts to his kid that would please all boys his age. Meanwhile Betty does a little more investigating on lawyer Leah Stillman before she hires her to represent Ignacio. And Wilhelmina hosts a Thanksgiving dinner as well but her feast doesn't look as good as it does in the magazine pictures she envisions.
9	9	"Lose the Boss"	Ken Whittingham	Oliver Goldstick	November 23, 2006	8.74
Betty is left alone during an important photo shoot during which the photographer, Bruno, has come up with questionable concepts. Meanwhile, Daniel spends the day with Betty's family helping to decorate their Christmas tree while also recovering from a hangover. Mr. Green interrogates a mortician about the remains of a client. Ignacio gets in trouble with Immigration and Customs.
10	10	"Fake Plastic Snow"	James Hayman	Veronica Becker & Sarah Kucserka	November 30, 2006	13.02
It's Christmas time at MODE, as Betty questions her relationship with Walter and her feelings for Henry. Daniel, on the other hand, is sure of his love for Sofia (Salma Hayek), despite her doubt, and Marc frantically tries to win over Wilhelmina in fear of losing his life. Meanwhile, Amanda vies for Betty's position as Daniel's new assistant by planning and executing a perfect MODE holiday party that fills the office with styrofoam snow and holiday wishes.
11	11	"Swag"	Tamra Davis	James D. Parriott	January 4, 2007	11.65
Betty helps Daniel entertain a Japanese designer who is visiting the magazine; Christina's swag giveaway causes mayhem among the employees; Wilhelmina is targeted by the accounting department and from behind the scenes.
12	12	"Sofia's Choice"	James Hayman	Silvio Horta	January 11, 2007	13.49
Betty starts at M.Y.W. and discovers that Sofia's assistant (portrayed by Becki Newton) is a dead ringer for Amanda; Surprises await at a strip club; Ignacio gets a caseworker; Wilhelmina starts showing her nice side after Ted returns.
13	13	"In or Out"	Michael Spiller	Myra Jo Martino	January 18, 2007	14.10
Betty consoles a heartbroken Daniel by setting him up with a supermodel, as Wilhelmina starts setting things up to take Daniel's job away... and along with that, Christina and Amanda's as well; Hilda goes into business for herself after Herbalux is recalled; the "mystery woman" is revealed.
14	14	"I'm Coming Out"	Wendey Stanzler	James D. Parriott	February 1, 2007	14.00
As Fashion Week nears, Betty is stunned that Daniel has hired Hilda to help with the preparations, while Daniel is stunned over Bradford's plans to hand over Meade Publications; an old friend causes Daniel to return to old habits (after Daniel tries to seduce her); Christina prepares to test the designer waters; Wilhelmina tests out a new line of cosmetic products; Amanda and Marc set their sights on a sought-after designer outfit; a bombshell will be dropped, affecting all parties involved.
15	15	"Brothers"	Lev L. Spiro	Shelia Lawrence	February 8, 2007	14.27
Everyone is in for a shocking reaction as Alexis shows up and drops more surprises for those involved, especially the Meades (who are now fighting among themselves), Betty (who has to play mediator for the dysfunctional clan) and Wilhelmina (who's using this backdrop as part of her expanded plans); Betty is asked out on a date by Henry and is in for a surprsing announcement from Walter; Hilda learns that Justin was in a fight at school and is surprised to learn that Santos now wants to be more involved in Justin's upbringing.
16	16	"Derailed"	James Hayman	Cameron Litvack	February 15, 2007	13.66
A blizzard in New York City could derail Christina's plans to create a designer gown for a high-profile celebrity; Betty and Walter finally go their separate ways, but Betty's way to Henry's heart is stopped at the tracks by his visiting girlfriend, Charlie; Claire is suspected by Betty in Fey's death; Santos returns to prove to Justin that he can be a father; Daniel and Alexis become co-EICs at MODE, a move that makes Wilhelmina furious and suspicious.
17	17	"Icing on the Cake"	Jeff Melman	Dailyn Rodriguez	March 15, 2007	10.80
Betty asks her orthodontist (played by Jesse Tyler Ferguson) out for a date after she is invited by Henry to Charlie's birthday party; Wilhelmina resorts to plan B as she tries to have Daniel and Alexis turn on each other; Daniel tries to keep Alexis from finding out about hiring Grace Chin (Lucy Liu) as Alexis keeps Bradford from leaving jail; Amanda is amused when a designer makes her his "muse" and sends her a silver rubber hobble dress named after her.
18	18	"Don't Ask, Don't Tell"	Tricia Brock	Sarah Kucserka, Veronica Becker & Marco Pennette	March 22, 2007	10.41
Marc, promising to help Betty with inside info for Daniel, convinces her to pretend to be his "girlfriend" when his suspicious mom, Mrs. Weiner (Tony winner Patti LuPone), arrives in town. Things go from bad to worse when Mrs. Weiner invites herself to dinner at the Suarez home and Betty's whole family has to play along with the charade. Meanwhile, Daniel and Alexis struggle to work together after their mom – who actually owns MODE – names them co-editors-in-chief of the magazine.
19	19	"Punch Out"	Miguel Arteta	Oliver Goldstick	April 19, 2007	9.46
Betty attempts to keep Daniel focused on his work, but he's tempted to return to his partying ways; Fey's secret diaries becomes a sought-after prize, thanks to Wilhelmina, Alexis and a tell-all writer who has the books in her possession; Constance pressures Ignacio into restarting their 'romance' again.
20	20	"Petra-Gate"	Paul Lazarus	Harry Werksman & Gabrielle Stanton	April 26, 2007	9.62
Betty finds herself alone after learning the truth about Daniel, Christina and Henry; Daniel tries to get over his latest breakup; For the first time as a woman, Alexis is asked out by a guy; Amanda flirts with a designer she thinks is gay; Wilhelmina attracts an unlikely suitor; Santos is ready to surprise Hilda.
21	21	"Secretaries' Day"	Victor Nelli, Jr.	Henry Alonso Myers	May 3, 2007	10.68
Betty juggles her task of bailing her family out of legal problems while setting things up for MODE's assistants' party, but the place she picks to hold the event could bring back memories for Amanda in more ways than one; Alexis ponders about accepting Rodrigo's offer; Daniel seeks Betty's help for his sex addiction; Hilda prepares for her exam; Wilhelmina makes her bold move to take over MODE.
22	22	"A Tree Grows in Guadalajara"	Lev L. Spiro	Tracy Poust & Jon Kinnally	May 10, 2007	9.63
The Suarezes travel to Mexico in an effort to help Ignacio obtain a visa, and at the same time reconnect with more lost relatives, who could provide Betty with the answers about her late mother and Ignacio's real identity; Alexis' former flame from her former life as Alex has now fallen for brother Daniel; Marc becomes jealous over Amanda's new gay friend; Wilhelmina tries to makeover her latest beau; Another "fea" shows up.
23	23	"East Side Story"	James Hayman	Silvio Horta & Marco Pennette	May 17, 2007	10.50
Betty and Henry's romance heats up, but then hits a stumbling block when Charlie announces she is pregnant. Henry and Charlie return to Arizona, but Betty later learns that Charlie cheated on Henry and the child may not be his. Meanwhile, Wilhelmina plans her wedding to Bradford, while Daniel descends further in a drug-induced downward spiral. Justin plays the lead in his school's production of West Side Story, while Santos is shot in a convenience-store robbery (and presumed killed). Claire makes a break from prison, while Daniel and Alexis are involved in an accident, where the brake lines of their car were purposely cut by the man Alexis hired to kill her father.

Notes:

- "Swag" was originally scheduled to be aired as the 4th episode, but was moved to 11th by the network. The change resulted in a number of continuity problems, which were "fixed" by making most of the episode a flashback and adding scenes with Betty telling Christina the bulk of the story. In Italy, Denmark, Spain, India and the Philippines, the episode is retained as the 4th episode.
- On the season 1 DVD box set, "Swag" is listed as episode 4, without the scenes of Betty talking to Christina in a flashback. Other noticeable changes on the DVD were the reversed order of the show's episode chronology: "The Box and the Bunny", which is the second episode, is listed as the third episode, having swapped places with "Queens for a Day". However, "The Box and the Bunny" should be the second episode.

== Ratings ==
=== United States ===
In the following summary, "Rating" is the estimated percentage of all televisions tuned to the show, and "Share" is the percentage of all televisions in use that are tuned in, "viewers" is the estimated number of actual people watching, in millions, while "ranking" is the approximate ranking of the show against all prime-time TV shows for the week (Sunday to Saturday).

Episode	Title	Airdate	Rating	Share	18–49	Viewers	Rank
1	"Pilot (aka I Am Not Going to Sell Herbalux)"	September 28, 2006	10.7	17	5.5	16.32	#9
2	"The Box and the Bunny"	October 5, 2006	9.5	15	4.9	14.26	#18
3	"Queens for a Day"	October 12, 2006	9.3	15	4.4	13.95	#21
4	"Swag"	January 4, 2007	7.8	12	3.9	11.65	#22
5	"Fey's Sleigh Ride"	October 19, 2006	8.9	14	4.3	13.17	#21
6	"The Lyin', the Watch and the Wardrobe"	October 26, 2006	8.9	14	4.3	13.14	#21
7	"Trust, Lust, and Must"	November 2, 2006	9.3	14	4.4	13.62	#22
8	"After Hours"	November 9, 2006	8.6	13	4.1	12.81	#27
9	"Four Thanksgivings and a Funeral"	November 16, 2006	8.9	14	3.9	12.95	#23
10	"Lose the Boss?"	November 23, 2006	5.3	11	2.9	8.74	#48
11	"Fake Plastic Snow"	November 30, 2006	9.0	14	4.3	13.02	#21
12	"Sofia's Choice"	January 11, 2007	10.4	16	4.4	13.49	#14
13	"In or Out"	January 18, 2007	9.5	15	4.5	14.10	#14
14	"I'm Coming Out"	February 1, 2007	9.3	14	4.8	14.00	#13
15	"Brothers"	February 8, 2007	9.1	14	4.7	14.27	#20
16	"Derailed"	February 15, 2007	9.1	14	4.5	13.66	#19
17	"Icing on the Cake"	March 15, 2007	7.4	12	3.5	10.80	#19
18	"Don't Ask, Don't Tell"	March 22, 2007	7.4	13	3.2	10.41	#24
19	"Punch Out"	April 19, 2007	6.7	12	3.0	9.46	#25
20	"Petra-Gate"	April 26, 2007	6.8	12	3.1	9.62	#29
21	"Secretaries' Day"	May 3, 2007	7.1	12	3.6	10.68	#27
22	"A Tree Grows in Guadalajara"	May 10, 2007	6.6	12	2.9	9.63	#32
23	"East Side Story"	May 17, 2007	7.1	13	3.5	10.50	#25

=== United Kingdom ===
Ugly Betty was aired on Channel 4 on a usual time of Fridays at 9.00pm.

Episode #	Title	Airdate	Rating (Millions)	Rank
1	"Pilot (aka I Am Not Going to Sell Herbalux)"	January 5, 2007	4.89m	#4
2	"The Box and the Bunny"	January 12, 2007	3.53m	#13
3	"Queens for a Day"	January 19, 2007	5.27m	#5
4	"Swag"	March 23, 2007	2.20m	#16
5	"Fey's Sleigh Ride"	January 26, 2007	4.07m	#9
6	"The Lyin', the Watch and the Wardrobe"	February 2, 2007	3.42m	#8
7	"Trust, Lust, and Must"	February 9, 2007	3.30m	#10
8	"After Hours"	February 16, 2007	3.12m	#8
9	"Four Thanksgivings and a Funeral"	February 23, 2007	3.32m	#3
10	"Lose the Boss"	March 2, 2007	2.98m	#8
11	"Fake Plastic Snow"	March 9, 2007	2.71m	#9
12	"Sofia's Choice"	March 30, 2007	2.36m	#12
13	"In or Out"	April 6, 2007	2.16m	#12
14	"I'm Coming Out"	April 13, 2007	2.48m	#5
15	"Brothers"	April 20, 2007	2.58m	#5
16	"Derailed"	April 27, 2007	2.25m	#15
17	"Icing on the Cake"	May 4, 2007	2.34m	#7
18	"Don't Ask, Don't Tell"	May 11, 2007	2.24m	#13
19	"Punch Out"	May 18, 2007	2.63m	#10
20	"Petra-Gate"	May 25, 2007	2.51m	#6
21	"Secretaries' Day"	May 25, 2007	2.60m	#4
22	"A Tree Grows in Guadalajara"	June 1, 2007	2.59m	#11
23	"East Side Story"	June 8, 2007	3.28m	#9

== DVD release ==
DVD name	Ep #	Release dates			Additional Features
DVD name	Ep #	Region 1	Region 2	Region 4	Additional Features
The Complete First Season – The Bettyfied Edition	23	August 21, 2007	September 24, 2007	October 31, 2007	This six disc box set contains all 23 episodes from the first season.

The 23 episodes, along with bonus footage and unaired extras, are featured in "Ugly Betty: The Complete First Season — The Bettyfied Edition", which is distributed internationally by Buena Vista Home Entertainment. According to TV Shows on DVD, BVHE released the six-disc set on August 21, 2007 and is available in regions 1 (United States and Canada), 2 (European territories) and 4 (Asia and Australia). The features include a look at the show's best and worst fashions, a Spanish audio track, a discussion with the cast on the show's origins, and a behind-the-scenes documentary with commentary from the production, set, and costume designers on the program. The discs are presented in Dolby Digital 5.1 Surround Sound and have a total running time of 992 minutes/946 minutes R4.

Among the features:

- "Becoming Ugly"
  - America Ferrera and the cast discuss what it means to get Bettyfied
- "A La MODE"
  - Behind-the-scenes with production, set and costume designers to discover how the world of MODE was created
- "Green is the New Black"
  - See the high fashion of Manhattan and coziness of Queens all created on a Hollywood sound stage
- Deleted scenes
- Audio commentaries
- Bloopers

== Soundtrack ==
The first season of the series included the following songs:

- Suddenly I See by KT Tunstall
- I Like It A Lot by Princess Superstar
- She Works Hard for the Money by Donna Summer
- Wanna Fly by Vassy
- In The Car Crash by Swayzak
- Love Me or Hate Me by Lady Sovereign
- Buttons by Pussycat Dolls
- Hips Don't Lie by Shakira
- La Cubanita by Los Ninos De Sara
- Keep Ya Body Movin' by Dance Dance Revolution
- Can I Get Get Get by Junior Senior
- Beauty and the Beast by Angela Lansbury
- Right Back Where We Started From by Maxine Nightingale
- Machine Gun by The Commodores
- Latin Lover by Lemon
- Season of the Witch by Luna
- Bad Girls by Donna Summuer
- The Glamorous Life by Sheila E
- A Marshmallow World by Dean Martin
- Santa Claus Is Comin' to Town by The Chipmunks
- Mambo Santa Mambo by The Enchanters
- Dance of the Sugar Plum Fairy (Red Baron Remix) by Berlin Symphony Orchestra
- Love Theme by Jeff Beal
- Broken heart by Jeff Beal
- Bebot by Black Eyed Peas
- We Share Our Mother's Health by The Knife
- 9 to 5 by Lady Sovereign
- The Weekend by Michael Gray
- I Got You Babe by Sonny and Cher
- Lovely 2 C U by Goldfrapp
- Because I'm Awesome by The Dollyrots
- Fame by David Bowie
- Shake by Mainline
- Ooh by Scissor Sisters
- I Know What Boys Like by The Waitresses
- Kiss And Say Goodbye by Steve Brookstein
- Tomorrow by Aileen Quinn
- What Goes Around...Comes Around by Justin Timberlake
- Super Freak by Rick James
- You Give Me Something by James Morrison
- Do Right Man by Aretha Franklin
- Turn to Real Life by Shiny Toy Guns
- Boys Wanna Be Her by Peaches
- Orange Sky by Alexi Murdoch
- Chariots of Fire by Vangelis
- I Am Ready by Counting Crows
- Colorblind by Counting Crows
- Grace Kelly by Mika
- Here I Come by Fergie
- Hot Like Wow by Space Cowboy Feat. Nadia Oh
- Running Away by Space Cowboy Feat. Nadia Oh
- Glamorous (Space Cowboy Remix) by Fergie
- We Luv You by Unkle Jam
- Mas Que Nada by Sergio Mendes feat. The Black Eyed Peas
- Departure by William Bradford Mersereau Jr.
- Eye of the Tiger by Survivor
- This is Not a Test by Oppenheimer
- We Will Rock You by Queen
- Sonido Total by Pinker Tones
- La Gallina by Ozomatli
- The Way We Were by Dave Koz feat. Vanessa L. Williams
