= After Hours (Ugly Betty) =

- Ugly Betty episode
- Walter questions the food at the restaurant that Betty is sent to review
- Episode no.: Season 1 Episode 7
- Directed by: Jim Hayman
- Written by: Dailyn Rodriguez
- Production code: 108
- Original air date: November 9, 2006

Guest appearance
- Salma Hayek

Episode chronology
← Previous "Trust, Lust, and Must"	Next → "Four Thanksgivings and a Funeral"
- Ugly Betty season 1

"After Hours" is an episode from the dramedy series Ugly Betty, which aired November 9, 2006. In the United States, Canada and Australia, it is the seventh episode but the eighth overall, and was written by Dailyn Rodriguez and directed by Jim Hayman.

== Plot ==
Daniel is trying to find a freelance reporter to write an article on a newly opened hotel. Betty arrives with his bagel, and Daniel decides he has found the person to write the review. Betty accepts the assignment from Daniel, but she and Walter had made plans to go to Atlantic City that weekend. Betty asks Walter to accompany her, but Walter declines, leaving Betty to visit the hotel on her own. Upon arrival, Betty finds herself being given the VIP treatment, including a massage given by a handsome man, only to be interrupted by Walter.

After she explains the situation, both Betty and Walter agreed to spend time in the hotel, as long as Betty can finish her review. As they look at the less-than-desirable cuisine in the restaurant, Walter becomes frustrated and orders a cheeseburger and fries. Betty admits that she is embarrassed, while Walter tells Betty he doesn't know her anymore since she started working at Mode. After realizing what Walter said days later, Betty leaves a message on his phone to apologize. After returning home, Betty sees Walter sitting on her steps; they kiss and make up after she tells him that despite her job she is still a Queens girl.

In Bradford's office, Wilhelmina is tasked to entertain a department store chain mogul from Texas. As Wilhelmina and Marc transform the office into "The Lone Star State," the two get a chance to learn more about their guest, who arrives just in time to be given the intro and pitch by Wilhelmina, who also was thinking of Nico and the care packet she sent to her. But the Texan wants a lot more excitement, so instead of a planned dinner reservation, he takes Wilhelmina and Marc to a honky tonk bar. After an evening of shots, the guest agrees to sign the deal, telling her that he was impressed before he thought of the bar idea and tells Wilhelmina about what it is like to be a parent.

Over at the Suarezes, Hilda tells Ignacio that she might be able to get money from her former boyfriend Santos, who also happens to be Justin's father, to pay Leah; though this does not sit well with either Ignacio or Justin. Later in the evening Hilda sees Santos playing dominoes and approaches him to ask about the money. Santos gives the money to Hilda on the condition that he sees Justin later in the evening. After she shows Ignacio the money, her dad is none too happy because of Santos' background, and it is made worse when she said he was stopping by. Hours later, Santos arrives at the Suarezes' - beaten up by thugs who wanted the money he gave Hilda. Hilda treats his wounds and tells him that he can still come by for Thanksgiving; much to Justin's chagrin.

Meanwhile, Daniel is none too happy that Sofia is now taking up space in the magazine's conference room as she prepares to launch her new magazine. The sexually charged banter between the two continues, along with accusations over his womanizing and her being a tease, and the two end up sharing an evening of unwinding over a game of pool at a bar.

The following day, after Sofia finishes up using the conference room, Daniel hopes they will hook up for another night together, only to have Sofia drop a bombshell; she has a boyfriend. Daniel then rejects Betty's article claiming it isn't right for Mode. Upset over the rejection, Betty seeks solace in the bathroom when Sofia gives her encouragement and offers to publish the article in her magazine. After she leaves, Betty's mood turns to excitement as she does a dance in the bathroom.

== Production ==
This episode welcomed Kevin Alejandro to the cast as Santos. In addition, stuntperson Anna Mercedes Morris would appear in the first of three episodes in which a stunt double was used for America Ferrera's character.

== Reception ==
Notes Entertainment Weekly's Tanner Stransky: "Think about it: Every Betty episode to date has been a variation on the same theme. Garishly dressed heroine heads to work, tries to fit in at unforgivingly chic fashion mag, fails miserably, then finds last-minute success/redemption thanks to her kind heart, intelligence, and sheer determination. The boss always acts like a horndog. His nemesis is always hilariously catty. The big sister brings the sass, the boyfriend brings the annoying, and the nephew brings the camp."

There was a lot of negative feedback from websites and blogs about Salma Hayek being added to the cast, as evidenced by these messages, which has called Hayek's character a "Mary Sue."

== Ratings ==
The episode was watched by 12.81 million viewers in the United States and placed 27th in the Nielsens for the week ending November 12, 2006

== Also starring ==
- Kevin Sussman - Walter
- Michael Urie - Marc
- Kevin Alejandro - Santos
- Salma Hayek - Sofia Reyes

== Guest stars ==
- Brett Cullen (Ted)
- Darryl Stephens (Waiter)
