= Don't Ask, Don't Tell (Ugly Betty) =

- Ugly Betty episode
- Marc [coming out] to his mother
- Episode no.: Season 1 Episode 18
- Directed by: Tricia Brock
- Written by: Marco Pennette, Veronica Becker & Sarah Kucserka
- Production code: 118
- Original air date: March 22, 2007

Guest appearance
- Patti LuPone

Episode chronology
← Previous "Icing on the Cake"	Next → "Punch Out (Footloose and Meade-Free)"
- Ugly Betty season 1

"Don't Ask, Don't Tell" is the 18th episode of the dramedy series Ugly Betty, which aired in the US on March 22, 2007. The episode was co-written by Marco Pennette, Veronica Becker and Sarah Kucserka and directed by Tricia Brock. The episode's title refers to the United States' "Don't ask, don't tell" military policy.

== Plot ==
In the wake of Claire Meade's arrest, the Suarezes find themselves dealing with the press coverage, and Betty expresses her guilt over Claire's arrest to Hilda.

At MODE, the now released Bradford and Alexis finally face off, with Bradford firing his daughter. Later, Bradford goes to see Claire, who is handcuffed to her bed, to see how she is doing. Daniel later comes in and Claire informs them that she wants them to be a family again, including Alexis. She overrules an extremely uncomfortable Bradford's firing of Alexis, reminding him that while he is the owner of Meade Publications, she owns the rights to MODE and therefore Alexis stays.

Meanwhile, Marc's mother — to whom he has never disclosed his homosexuality — visits the office; bringing her cat, Lady Buttons of Camelot. Marc tells Amanda, who has willingly pretended to be Marc's girlfriend during such visits for three years, that he is "dumping" her in absentia because he wants to escape his mother's pressure to move on to marriage.

Hours later, Betty tells Daniel that it may be a good thing that he and Alexis work side by side, but Daniel informs her that it was never easy working directly beside Alex, because he always had to come out on top. Daniel and Alexis later meet with Wilhelmina to inform her that they are both Editors-in-Chief at MODE while she is still the creative director. When Daniel begins to claim what duties he will handle, Alexis interrupts and insists that she does not want anything to do with the business. After Daniel leaves the room, Wilhelmina dissuades Alexis from leaving MODE and tells her to take what belongs to her, then volunteers her office. Marc then panics when Wilhelmina drags him down to their new office and tells him it is only temporary—just long enough for Alexis and Daniel to push each other out.

Marc receives a text message on his cell phone informing him that his mother is in the building. Marc's mother, Jean, stops at the desk to see Amanda and insults her for her alleged drug and sex addictions. An incensed Amanda then sees Betty walking down the hall, pulls her over to the desk and vengefully tells Jean that Betty is Marc's new girlfriend. Betty laughs, but before she is able to mention that Marc is gay, Marc cuts Betty off in mid-sentence by kissing her on the lips. He then takes a stunned Betty to the bathroom and begs her to help him conceal his homosexuality from his mother; she agrees to play along. Back at the desk Amanda notices Betty's cell phone is ringing, and when she sees it is Ignacio on the phone, Amanda cruelly hands the phone to Jean, who initiates a chat about Betty and Marc's relationship. Moments later Amanda joyfully rushes over to tell Marc and Betty that they have dinner plans with Betty's family. Marc promises to give Betty important information to help save Daniel's job in exchange for her help.

Betty informs Daniel that Alexis is planning to take over the company and push him out, prompting Daniel to confront Alexis, who then tells him they should try working together. Daniel insists he is not just her kid brother anymore and she cannot push him around, but when Alexis tells him they are in this 50/50, he instructs her to have her "letter from the editor" ready by noon the next day so they can print them side by side. When he leaves, she calls in her new assistant, Nick, and orders him to cancel his plans for tonight because they have to complete their work by midnight, informing him Daniel is crazy if he thinks she is going to share anything with him. Alexis has a major photo shoot and submits her pictures for the next cover of MODE. Wilhelmina is pleased with this scheme, but Alexis tells her that Daniel is not going to know what hit him. As Betty advises Daniel to write his "letter from the editor" as his own statement about the Meade family instead of about shoes, Wilhelmina then visits Claire in the hospital and expresses her concerns about the business due to the divide between Daniel and Alexis. She suggests she have her attorney to draw up a power of attorney so she can keep things running smoothly, but Claire informs Wilhelmina that only a Meade will run the company from now on. Wilhelmina then taunts Claire's alcoholism by pouring a glass of liquor on the table just out of Claire's reach. Scheming in her office, Wilhelmina scratches out her own last name on her stationery and writes Meade in its place, then asks Bradford out on a dinner date.

Marc, Jean and Buttons the cat arrive at the Suarez household for dinner. As everyone struggles to make conversation during the dinner, Betty focuses the conversation on Jean and her cats. Jean then brings up Marc's old roommate and friend, Chuck; oblivious that Chuck and Marc had actually dated. After Hilda and Ignacio jokingly hint at Marc's homosexuality, Betty excuses them to her room, informing a reluctant Marc that he is a grown man and needs to tell his mother the truth, assuring him that it is the right thing to do and will improve their relationship. Justin arrives and complains to everyone that his father took him out for fast food when he is trying his best to watch points for swim suit season, before showing off his "Free Claire Meade" T-shirt, saying that he will not rest until Claire is free. When Buttons notices the door open and runs out, Ignacio runs after her and sets the alarm off on his ankle tag.

As Jean sits in shock at all the chaos, Daniel visits the house, and when Jean asks who he is, Justin tells her that Daniel is Betty's ex-boyfriend. Daniel tells Betty that he has finished his letter and wants her to proof it, to see her look at him with pride. She informs him that she is proud of him and that she will submit it in time for the printers. After Daniel leaves, Marc walks in and informs Betty that she need not worry about the letter since Alexis has already sent the issue to print. In shock, Betty runs off to notify Daniel and they rush off to stop the press, leaving Marc all alone with his mother and Betty's family.

As Marc and Jean gather their things to leave Betty's house, he informs her he is breaking up with Betty. She is thrilled to hear this and starts criticizing all the Suarez family until Justin runs by, excited to watch a Golden Girls marathon. Jean insults Justin, calling him "swishy". Marc becomes furious and sternly informs his mother that these people have done a really nice thing for him and that she is practically calling her own son "swishy" by insulting Justin. Marc tells her to open her eyes and see him for what he really is. He bravely tells her that he loves her, but wants her to know the real him as he is. Jean tells her son that she does not want to know him for the lifestyle he has chosen, and sarcastically thanks the Suarezes for a "lovely" evening while leaving the house.

Alexis sees Daniel and Betty running down the street to the printers and as they sprint side by side toward the entrance, Alexis wins in the end. Daniel later runs into Betty at a bar and tells her that if Alexis wants the company, then she can have it and he will be only too glad to return to his old lifestyle of partying and unemployment.

Betty arrives back home and finds Marc sitting alone on her front porch. He tells her that his mother left when he told her the truth. Betty tells him she has learned that it is not always family that loves you the most, but that sometimes it is the family we make for ourselves. Marc tells her fondly that she will always be his "Little Chimichanga" and then leaves to go home while Betty sits alone to read the letter that Daniel wrote, in which he talks about how happy he is to have Alexis back with him and that his family is finally coming together. Betty then goes inside and spends time with her family.

== Production ==
Marc and his mother have different last names. In "Fake Plastic Snow" we learned that Marc's last name is St. James, but in this episode his mother's last name is Weiner, which means that this is also Marc's real last name. However that reason behind Marc's last name being changed was edited out when "Don't Ask" aired. In the deleted scene, Betty asks Mark, "Your real (last) name is Weiner?" Marc answers: "I had to change it. A gay kid named Weiner? I wanted to beat myself up." The idea for Marc to come out to his mother was both actor Michael Urie (Marc St. James) and America Ferrera's idea.

In a bonus feature from the season one DVD, the scene where Betty bumps into a bus shelter is actually a green screen with the outside setting digitized.

Ashley Jensen (Christina) does not appear in this episode. Also, this episode introduces Max Greenfield to the cast as Nick Pepper.

This episode makes references to properties with connections to The Walt Disney Company and its subsidiaries: Golden Girls, Cinderella (which Henry claims is Betty's favorite character and movie), Mulan, She's All That and High School Musical (which is Marc's favorite musical).

== Awards ==
"Don't Ask, Don't Tell" was submitted for consideration in the category of "Outstanding Writing in a Comedy Series" for the 2007 Emmy Awards. In addition, Vanessa L. Williams submitted this episode for consideration in the category of "Outstanding Supporting Actress in a Comedy Series" on her behalf. Mark Indelicato and Michael Urie also chose this episode respectively to submit for consideration of their work in the category of "Outstanding Supporting Actor in a Comedy Series," while Patti Lupone submitted this episode as her entry in the category of "Outstanding Guest Actress in a Comedy Series".

== Music notes ==
The song "Boys Wanna Be Her" by Peaches is played during Alexis's photo shoot. The song heard at the end of this episode is "Orange Sky" by Alexi Murdoch.

== Reception ==
The episode was well-received because of Michael Urie's character. Entertainment Weekly's Tanner Stransky noted, "Looks like my Betty wish came true. In my TV Watch last week, I pined for more focus on the supporting characters, and — voila! — an episode centered on Marc, his sexuality, and how he has not come out to his in-your-face, overbearing mother. Plus, some nice support from Amanda. And a bit from his girlfriend Betty, too. Simply awesome. And we were treated to Claire in the hospital, Willy hatching more ways to take over Mode (including an attempt to seduce Bradford!), and some always awkward conversation between Henry and Betty. Double awesome. All around, another great episode."

== Also starring ==
- Judith Light (Claire Meade)
- Christopher Gorham (Henry)
- Max Greenfield (Nick Pepper)

== Guest stars ==
- Patti LuPone (Mrs. Jean Weiner)
- John Burke (Reporter)
