= Icing on the Cake =

- Ugly Betty episode
- Amanda wearing "The Amanda"
- Episode no.: Season 1 Episode 17
- Directed by: Jeff Melman
- Written by: Dailyn Rodriguez
- Production code: 117
- Original air date: March 15, 2007

Episode chronology
← Previous "Derailed"	Next → "Don't Ask, Don't Tell"
- Ugly Betty season 1

"Icing on the Cake" is the 17th episode from the dramedy series Ugly Betty, which aired March 15, 2007. The episode was written by Dailyn Rodriguez and directed by Jeff Melman.

== Plot ==
As Grace and Daniel finish having sex in bed, Daniel feels a very hot orgasm before starting the day. He tells her where she has been all his life as Grace has a very sexy body as from her nerdy appearance during college and she likes to have sex three times a night. Daniel then panics when she informs him that she needs to speak with his mother, but tells her that Claire has gone away and that she probably won’t be able to find her, so Daniel sends Claire off to a hotel to stay low and instructs her not to talk to anyone. Daniel later tells Betty that she can’t let anyone know that he is sleeping with Grace, including Alexis. So Betty swears to keep the secret and heads downstairs to see Christina, only to learn that Christina knows about Daniel and Grace as she sees through Betty's secret.

Henry stops in and gives Betty the invitation to Charlie’s birthday party. Christina is surprised to hear that she is going, but Betty informs her that she does not want to lose Henry as a friend. Christina insists that Betty will need a date for the evening, so they ponder the thought and Betty calls her orthodontist for an appointment and informs him that a wire has snapped on her braces, so he schedules her for one. As she hangs up the phone Betty turns to Christina with a big smile, and in turn Christina snaps a wire. Later in the day Betty arrives for her appointment and tells her that it happened while eating a bagel. After he fixes the problem and she promises to be more careful, Betty responds that he may have to have dinner with her to ensure that she doesn’t eat anything too dangerous. Her plan works and he accepts her proposal.

Over at Casa Suarez, Constance visits Ignacio and continues to pour on the charm by wrestling him down and steals a kiss. As Hilda and Justin walk in the front door they are shocked to find Ignacio hiding in the dark from his case worker. He tells them that he doesn’t know what to do about her. Justin tells them that Constance gave him $1 the other day to call her grandma. Despite all this Ignacio insists that he has to keep her happy until the court date. Later on in the day Hilda gives Constance a new hairdo, only to freak out when Hilda tells her that Ignacio is a ladies' man. Constance tells Hilda that he should have told her if he was seeing someone, but tells Hilda that she is okay with it.

Back at MODE, Amanda tells Marc that she met designer Oswald Lorenzo the other night at a party and tells him the story of how she fought another girl for his affections at the social. Amanda opens a packaged delivery and finds a dress that Lorenzo has sent to her and is thrilled to find out that he has named the dress "The Amanda". Amanda grabs the tiny silver hobble dress and runs to change into it and it fits as tight as a mermaid outfit. As Amanda struggles to move around she refuses to take it off.

Alexis goes to see Wilhelmina and tells her that she has to at least give Daniel a chance since he was willing to turn his back on their father, only to learn that Alexis is upset and leaves when she sees the news coverage of Grace Chin defending her father. This prompts Alexis to interrupt the board meeting and yells to Daniel about Grace's track record and to point out that their father is a murderer and still blames him for causing turmoil in the Meade family. As Marc listens from around the corner, Daniel tells his sister that he doesn’t know anything about hiring Grace. Amanda rushes over to get the scoop and falls flat on her face because the dress is way too tight.

Later that evening, Betty and Gabe (her orthodontist) arrive at the party, surprising even Henry. Charlie tells Betty that Gabe is so cute and she can sense the chemistry between them. The four of them head over to the bar and manage to make small talk, followed by a slow song as they pair off and dance. But the evening is interrupted when Claire calls Betty and tells her that it's an emergency and she needs a corporate credit card fast. As Betty arrives at Claire’s hotel room and finds her packing her bags, she tells Betty that she has to disappear, but Betty insists that she call Daniel first, prompting Claire to throw her cell phone across the room and destroying it. Betty tells Claire that she doesn’t have the credit card with her. Meanwhile, Gabe walks in and Claire wants to know what she is doing with him when it's Henry that she really likes. So Betty plays it off by kindly suggesting that it was a long time ago.

As Marc and Wilhelmina plow through the closet looking for a specific dress, they learn from Christina that Daniel had it, so when Wilhelmina becomes suspicious and demanded to know what Daniel did with the dress, Christina refuses. But when Wilhelmina threatens to call Betty to tell her about the "evidence" she that got her into Fashion Week, Christina lashes out at her and tells her that she can’t keep treating her like this, but gives in and tells them that Daniel gave the dress to Grace. Both Wilhelmina and Marc are puzzled since Daniel has told everyone that he doesn’t even know Grace, so Wilhelmina quickly puts 2 and 2 together and orders Marc to follow Daniel everywhere he goes and to get proof of his affair with Grace.

Daniel panics when Betty comes in and informs him that Grace is going to talk to Claire. Daniel locates them at a restaurant and tries to interrupt, but Grace insists that she be able to speak with Claire. Claire informs Grace that Fey was cruel and manipulative. Grace excuses herself to take a phone call. Daniel takes the time to ask her again to stay clear of Grace, but she insists that she knows what is best. Daniel steps out to the lobby of the restaurant and uses his charm on Grace. She tells him that he has six minutes and they rush inside the coat check room where no one is allowed in. Inside they quickly undress each other and start to have sex, unaware that someone was watching. It was Marc who took out his cell phone and started recording, he didn't like looking at it but managed to.

Hours later Wilhelmina is thrilled to get the video that Marc has captured on his cell phone of Grace and Daniel having sex on a dirty floor, so she burns it on CD and delivers the proof to Alexis, who becomes furious. Wilhelmina tells her that she knows exactly how she feels because she has been betrayed by a so-called friend (Alexis). As Grace tells Daniel that she knows that Claire is the one that killed Fey and tells him that she is confident that she can help her mother out of the situation by getting her doctors to testify, Alexis walks in and scolds her brother for lying to her. As Alexis shows Daniel and Grace the footage, she tells them that she wants Grace to remove herself from the case or she will show it to the judge. Grace becomes furious and tells Daniel that he needs a shrink and tells Alexis that she needs a closer shave. When she leaves, Daniel tells Alexis that he can’t believe what she has done and shocks Alexis when he tells her that Claire killed Fey, and thanks to Alexis's interference and the CD, their mother will go to jail because of it.

Across town, Betty takes Claire and Gabe to her house to get the credit card, even as she tries to convince Claire not to leave the country. But as Claire reminds Betty of how she killed Fey, Gabe takes this as a sign that he needs to leave, but Betty lies, saying it's a game. As Betty goes upstairs to get the card she leaves the two of them alone. Ignacio walks in and mistakes Gabe for Henry. Claire corrects him and tells him that she has seen the accountant and that he is much hotter. He once again screams to Betty that he really should go, but she yells back for her father to put on some coffee for them all. Ignacio takes Claire’s coat and asks her how she likes her coffee ("vodka and ice...hold the coffee.") She takes a seat on the couch and Constance spies through the window. Betty calls Daniel and prays that he will answer. A loud knock at the door suddenly comes as Ignacio is in the kitchen, and when Claire opens the door she finds Constance there accusing her of stealing her man and gets into a shoving match until Ignacio and Gabe come between them. Ignacio takes Constance to the kitchen and tells her that Claire is not his girlfriend, and neither is she. But as he turns to the sink, she slaps an electronic tracking device to his ankle and tells him that she will now know where he is at every minute of every day. When Betty rushes downstairs to see what is going on, Gabe tells her that she still has feelings for Henry and he leaves.

Betty gives Claire the credit card so that she can leave the country, saying that she watched the man she loved love someone else and it killed her and makes her promise not to make the same mistake that she did. Betty sits with Claire on the couch and tells her that she needs to be strong right now and that running away isn’t the answer so Claire calls the police and turns herself in for murdering Fey. The cops swarm the house and take Claire into custody.

Meanwhile, another package arrives for Amanda. She tells the delivery guy that she has rubber burns all over her body from that dress and that she doesn’t want anymore gifts, but gets excited though when he tells her that this time it's a hat. As she opens the box Amanda puts on the rubber cone shaped hat on her head, unaware that she is the target of a rival worker at MODE, who set Amanda up with help from the delivery guy, for she hated Amanda.

Finally, Henry goes to see Betty in her office and tells her that he hated that she had to leave so soon last night, so he invites her to have lunch with Charlie and him, but Betty tells him that it is not good for her to hang out with the two of them and she just can’t do that right now. She informs him that right now they can only be two people that happen to work in the same building. As Henry gives her a slice of birthday cake and leaves, Betty instantly threw it away without him noticing.

== Production ==
Viewers hear Amanda's last name during this episode. Though it sounded like 'Tanner' it was shown to be 'Tanen' in the 21st episode Secretaries' Day, where a screen shot of Amanda's acting reel shows her name to be spelled 'Tanen'.

The Wizard of Oz is referenced yet again when Wilhelmina tells Marc to "fly my pretty!" The first time was in "I'm Coming Out" when she told Fabia that she would "get her...and her little dog too" and again when Christina said she was "not one of [Wilhelmina's] flying monkeys"

When Claire checked in the Grand Regent Hotel, she went under the pseudonym "Brandy Schlooe" so she can keep a low profile. Brandy Schlooe was also the name of JoBeth Williams's character on "Guiding Light" from 1976 to 1977.

== Casting ==
This is the last episode in which lawyer Grace Chin (Lucy Liu) appears. Also, Alan Dale, although credited, was absent from this episode.

== Awards ==
Jesse Tyler Ferguson submitted this episode for consideration of his work in the category of "Outstanding Guest Actor in a Comedy Series" for the 2007 Emmy Awards.

== Music notes ==
The song played during the slow dance of Charlie's party is "You Give Me Something" by James Morrison.

== Reception ==
The episode is considered the weakest of the series. In a review of the episode, Entertainment Weekly's Tanner Stransky notes, "You'd think an episode titled Icing on the Cake would be sweet and totally Betty-licious. Coated in wonderful Betty one-liners. Whipped up with delicate Betty care. And smoothed over with a perfect Betty glaze. Just the way fans ordered it. But that's not how our dessert was served up tonight. There was something actually ugly — okay, maybe just unattractive — about this episode of Betty, don't you think, TV Watchers?"

== Ratings ==
The episode was only seen by 10.63 million viewers in the United States, down slightly from the previous episode.

== Also starring ==
- Judith Light (Claire Meade)
- Christopher Gorham (Henry)
- Jayma Mays (Charlie)

== Guest stars ==
- Lucy Liu (Grace Chin)
- Jesse Tyler Ferguson (Dr. Gabe Farkas)
