= A Tree Grows in Guadalajara =

- Ugly Betty episode
- Episode no.: Season 1 Episode 22
- Directed by: Lev L. Spiro
- Written by: Tracy Poust & Jon Kinnally
- Original air date: May 10, 2007
- Running time: 43 minutes

Guest appearances
- Arap Bethke (Antonio Reyes); Lilyan Chauvin (The curandera); Rebecca Gayheart (Jordan); Lillian Hurst (Yolanda); Justina Machado (Cousin Clara); Rita Moreno (Aunt Mirta); Bunnie Rivera (Yolanda's nurse); Mykel Shannon-Jenkins (Tavares)

Episode chronology
← Previous "Secretaries' Day"	Next → "East Side Story"
- Ugly Betty season 1

"A Tree Grows in Guadalajara" is the 22nd episode of the first season of the American television dramedy Ugly Betty. It was written by Tracy Poust and Jon Kinnally and directed by Lev L. Spiro. The episode was originally broadcast by the American Broadcasting Company (ABC) in the United States on May 10, 2007.

Ugly Betty centers on Betty Suarez's job at the fashion magazine MODE, where she works despite not fitting their expectations of female beauty and style. In this episode, Betty accompanies her family on a trip to Mexico and learns more about her mother. Back at MODE's New York office, Alexis Meade has a tense reunion with ex-girlfriend Jordan Dunn. Amanda Tanen and Marc St. James disagree over her relationship, and Bradford Meade attempts to recapture his youth.

"A Tree Grows in Guadalajara" features guest appearances by Rita Moreno, Justina Machado and Rebecca Gayheart. The initial broadcast of the episode was watched by 9.4 million viewers; it received the second-highest rating for its time slot. The scenes in Mexico have attracted attention from scholars who discussed the episode's representation of Mexico, the Suarez family's cultural background, and Betty's relationship with her mother. "A Tree Grows in Guadalajara" received a mixed response from critics, some of whom praised certain lines of its dialogue.

== Plot ==
Ignacio Suarez returns to Mexico, accompanied by his two daughters, Betty and Hilda, and his grandson Justin, to obtain a United States visa. Betty researches her mother Rosa and their family tree. She learns that her maternal grandmother, Yolanda Salazar, is alive and that she disapproved of her parents' relationship. Betty takes Hilda to look for a blue house that a curandera ("healer") predicts holds answers about their mother. Following visions of her crush, Henry Grubstick, Betty finds Yolanda, who is being treated for Alzheimer's disease. Yolanda mistakes Betty for her daughter, and apologizes for mistreating Ignacio. Betty is gifted her mother's wedding dress, which she gives to Hilda for her upcoming wedding. Ignacio tells them that his visa request was denied and he must remain in Mexico. A waiter recognizes Ignacio for murdering Rosa's first husband, Ramiro Vasquez, and sets up a revenge plot.

At the fashion magazine MODE, creative director Wilhelmina Slater informs co-editors-in-chief Daniel and Alexis Meade that Jordan Dunn will be the "Fearless Woman" feature. Alexis disagrees with the choice to hire her ex-girlfriend. Daniel continues abusing drugs rather than handle his sex addiction. He accompanies Jordan on a bungee jumping photo shoot to make Alexis jealous. Alexis and Jordan reconcile and kiss. While trying to get more pills, Daniel is beaten by two men.

Meanwhile, MODE receptionist Amanda Tanen is having a secret relationship with up and coming designer Tavares, who pretends to be gay to advance his career in fashion; Wilhelmina's assistant and Amanda's friend Marc St. James grows jealous of this. Amanda advises Tavares on his designs, but he publicly mistreats her. Upon discovering them kissing, Marc berates Amanda for pursuing toxic relationships. He exposes Tavares as straight, but no one cares; Amanda ruins Tavares's reputation by showing his coconut-shell shirts, a design that Wilhelmina hates. Amanda and Marc reconcile and discover the love dungeon, which former editor-in-chief Fey Sommers had built during her affair with Meade publications CEO Bradford Meade.

Bradford hesitates about finalizing his divorce from his wife Claire Meade. Wilhelmina encourages Bradford to get a makeover to relive his younger days and enlists the help of MODE's seamstress, Christina McKinney. Wilhelmina tries to build Bradford's ego by ordering Marc to flirt with him, but Bradford realizes he cannot recapture his youth; Wilhelmina says she prefers his refinement compared to his younger and cockier self. Touched by her words, Bradford signs the divorce papers.

== Production ==
The 43-minute episode was written by Tracy Poust and Jon Kinnally and directed by Lev L. Spiro. The episode was filmed in Los Angeles in April 2007. In the same month, the American Broadcasting Company (ABC) announced that Rita Moreno and Justina Machado would guest-star as members of Betty's family, and Rebecca Gayheart would play Alexis' ex-girlfriend. An Ottawa Sun writer considered the casting to be part of Ugly Betty's promotion for the May sweeps. Prior to the episode airing, Entertainment Weekly's Michael Slezak speculated that Gayheart could play Amanda Tanen's older sister since he believe she resembled Becki Newton.

People en Español erroneously reported that Angélica Vale would reprise her role as Letticia "Lety" Padilla Solis from the Mexican telenovela La fea más bella for the episode. ABC contacted Vale's manager to arrange the guest appearance; Vale described the network's directness as odd, saying that Mexican actors were not often reached out to by Hollywood programs. It would have been the first crossover between two Yo soy Betty, la fea adaptations, in which Betty Suarez meets Lety while visiting Mexico. However, Vale portrayed an orthodontist's receptionist in the following episode, "East Side Story", instead.

== Themes ==
The episode's portrayal of Mexico received academic attention. Media studies scholar Alex Bevan wrote that Ugly Betty treats Mexico as a "dreamscape". Bevan identified curandera's prophecies, Betty's visions, and seemingly coincidental meetings with people from Ignacio's past as part of the "Orientalist tradition of representing the non-Western world". She considered the episode to be typical of diasporic media, saying they portray Mexico with similar "openness, spatiality, and dream-like qualities" used by diasporic cinema to represent the homeland. Film studies scholar Kathleen Rowe Karlyn associated the episode with magic realism because of its unnatural lighting and Betty's visions of Henry. Chicana/o studies professors Eliza Rodriguez y Gibson and Tanya González argued that Ugly Betty unironically invokes and parodies popular images of Mexico to address sociopolitical issues around immigration. They wrote that the series uses camp by characterizing Mexico through stereotypes.

Scholars discussed the episode's representation of nationality. Although the Suarez family has a Mexican background, none of the actors portraying these characters are Mexican or Mexican American. Instead, the show casts Hispanic actors of varying nationalities to establish a broader connection with its Latino/a viewers. Academics noted that during the scenes in Mexico, the Americanness of Betty and her immediate family are emphasized to contrast with their surroundings. Throughout the episode, Betty struggles with Spanish, which represents similar experiences felt by second-generation immigrants. According to Latino studies scholar Isabel Molina-Guzmán, "A Tree Grows in Guadalajara" is one of the few instances where Ugly Betty uses Betty and Hilda's ethnicity for humor; scenes focus on their "adept acculturation to U.S. society and foreignness in Mexico", comparable to a fish out of water story.

Betty's relationship to her mother was the subject of scholarly analysis. Yo soy Betty, la fea includes a mother character, but for the Ugly Betty adaptation, Betty's mother is shown as dead prior to the series premiere. Latino studies scholar Amara Graf describes Betty and Hilda's search for their maternal grandmother as the inverse of La Llorona ("The Weeping Woman"), a folk tale about a dead mother looking for her children. According to Graf, Betty and Hilda take on a metaphorical quest to better understand their cultural backgrounds and mother country. Karyln had a different interpretation of the episode, writing that by finding her grandmother and learning more about her mother, Betty grows into her "own adult identity" and decides to pursue Henry.

== Broadcast history and release ==
"A Tree Grows in Guadalajara" received a Nielsen rating of 9.4 million viewers, the second-highest rating for its time slot behind an episode of the reality television series Survivor. It was number one for its time slot for women viewers aged 18 to 34 and number two for adults in the same category. The ratings were down from the show's previous episode ("Secretaries' Day") which was viewed by 10.7 million people. The following episode ("East Side Story") saw a ratings increase to 10.4 million viewers. "A Tree Grows in Guadalajara" was included in the season one DVD release in 2007, and made available on iTunes and other streaming video on demand services, including Amazon Prime Video, Hulu, Google Play, and Vudu.

== Critical reception ==
"A Tree Grows in Guadalajara" received a mixed critical response. Alex Strachan, writing for the Ottawa Sun, praised the episode as "funny ... but also sweet and gently charming, without being sentimental or cloying". Despite his initial apprehension that the storyline around Ignacio's citizenship status would be boring, Entertainment Weekly's Tanner Stransky enjoyed it and said it became "a breath of fresh, wholesome air in an otherwise really bitchy, shallow (but totally delicious!) season of television". Although he enjoyed Amanda and Marc's friendship, Stransky dismissed Alexis and Jordan's kiss as "cheap" and Gayheart's acting as incongruent with the show's style. Vulture's Amina Akhtar criticized the fashion, specifically the clothing worn by Hilda and Marc.

Lines from the episode's dialogue were highlighted in reviews. Akhtar praised one of Marc and Wilhelmina's conversations, citing "You're as dead on the outside as you are on the inside" as an example. Strachan described Wilhelmina's response to Tavares' heterosexuality, "Well this is my very first public 'in-ning.' And while it's interesting, I don't see how it's relevant", as an example of the show's wit and subversion of stereotypes. In a retrospective review of Ugly Betty's most notable quotes, Zap2it's Andrea Reiher included Marc's line, "Of course, Tavares. Clearly you replaced me with that African queen, I'm yestergay's news".
