= Fey's Sleigh Ride =

- Ugly Betty episode
- Walter sings "Beauty and the Beast" to Betty on the steps of her house
- Episode no.: Season 1 Episode 4
- Directed by: Tricia Brock
- Written by: Sheila Lawrence
- Production code: 105
- Original air date: October 19, 2006

Guest appearances
- Rhys Coiro and Nicholas Gonzalez

Episode chronology
← Previous "Queens for a Day"	Next → "The Lyin', the Watch and the Wardrobe"
- Ugly Betty season 1

"Fey's Sleigh Ride" is the fourth broadcast episode of the American comedy-drama series Ugly Betty (fifth overall). It aired on October 19, 2006, after being scheduled for October 26, 2006. The episode was written by Sheila Lawrence and directed by Tricia Brock.

== Plot ==
Betty attends a fashion-industry bar with Marc and Amanda, who expect her to embarrass herself while trying to fit in. There they encounter Carlo Medina, an employee of rival magazine Isabella, as well as fellow MODE staffer Carol, who clashes with her coworkers.

The next day, Wilhelmina learns that Isabella has obtained details of MODE's upcoming Christmas spread and begins interrogating departments to identify the source. Suspicion falls on Betty, Marc, and Amanda because each spoke with Carlo at the bar. Betty admits she mentioned minor details, while Marc and Amanda attempt to shift blame to Carol. Wilhelmina concludes that Carol provided the crucial information and dismisses her, while quietly recruiting Carlo as an informant inside Isabella.

With the original concept compromised, Daniel proposes a replacement shoot inspired by a past holiday spread featuring Fey Sommers on a sleigh. The idea advances the season-long mystery surrounding Fey’s death and the missing music box connected to Bradford’s affair. A message urges Daniel to examine the box’s contents, and Betty discovers burned items inside that trigger Daniel’s memories of his parents’ marriage and its fallout.

At home, Walter continues trying to win Betty back, following Ignacio’s advice and performing "Beauty and the Beast" for her. Meanwhile, Justin talks Betty into bringing him to work for a school project, which ends with Hilda disciplining him for skipping school. Betty also learns troubling information about Ignacio after discovering discrepancies in his Social Security records, raising questions about his past.

== Production ==
The episode was produced as the fifth of the season, but it aired earlier after "Swag" was postponed. Some scenes were edited, including material involving Wilhelmina taking the music box from Bradford’s office; the filmed footage appeared in the "Previously on Ugly Betty" recap. During the episode, the music box prop plays while its internal components remain stationary.

The episode includes the fourth installment of the in-show telenovela Vidas de Fuego, featuring Marlene Favela and Luis Roberto Guzmán. A line indicating that MODE is 50 years old places its founding around 1956. The rival magazine Isabella has been interpreted as a tongue-in-cheek reference to Mirabella.

== Reception ==
Entertainment Weekly critic Michael Slezak highlighted the episode’s use of the series’ central mystery and described its emotional impact as a turning point in the early run.

== Ratings ==
The episode was watched by 13.1 million viewers in the United States, the series’ fifth-highest audience overall.

== Also starring ==
- Michael Urie as Marc St. James
- Kevin Sussman as Walter
- Elizabeth Payne as the masked woman
- Stelio Savante as Steve
- Diane Cary as Bradford’s assistant

== Guest stars ==
- Rhys Coiro as Vincent Bianchi
- Cleo King as Anne Fraiser
- Miranda Frigon as Carol
- Nicholas Gonzalez as Carlo Medina
