= Derailed (Ugly Betty) =

- Ugly Betty episode
- Lucy Liu as Grace Chinn
- Episode no.: Season 1 Episode 16
- Directed by: Jim Hayman
- Written by: Cameron Litvack
- Production code: 116
- Original air date: February 15, 2007

Episode chronology
← Previous "Brothers"	Next → "Icing on the Cake"
- Ugly Betty season 1

"Derailed" is the 16th episode from the dramedy series Ugly Betty, which aired on February 15, 2007. It was written by Cameron Litvack and directed by Jim Hayman.

== Plot ==
After having a nightmare about Claire Meade, Betty tells Daniel about Claire's confession of killing Fey Sommers. Daniel insists that Claire becomes a little deranged when she drinks, but after Betty goes into the details about the murder, Daniel immediately takes this info to Bradford at prison. However Bradford tells Daniel that Claire is simply a confused drunk and instead wants his son to focus on other things. Bradford orders him to hire lawyer Grace Chin, a plain girl whom Daniel happened to stand up when they went to college together. When the now-attractive Grace finally arrives to meet Daniel, she stuns him by refusing to take the case and confronts him for the way he treated her back at college. Daniel insists that this matter is about his father and pledges to make it up to Grace. He tries to plan a dinner for him and Grace, but she reads out a list of girls he hurt in college and orders him to apologize to all of them in exchange for her taking the case. Daniel takes her orders and starts to make the long overdue calls, only for Grace to see his sadness as a turn-on, and they then have sex.

Marc tells a stressed Wilhelmina that he will find out what is going on with Alexis, as Wilhelmina calls Christina to her office and demands to know if Betty has said anything about her and Daniel and reminds Christina that her job is to "snitch", not "stitch". When Marc informs Wilhelmina that Alexis' calendar is blank and that she has no friends (of any kind), Wilhelmina invites Alexis out to the Met for a girls' night. Along the way, Wilhelmina and Alexis stop by for drinks. As Wilhelmina steps away for a minute to call Marc and see how things are going, she turns around and is upset to find Alexis talking to a guy named Joel. Wilhelmina rushes over and tells Alexis that it is time to go so that they can get to the show, but Alexis tells her that she wants to stay, and end up staying for a bit longer as Alexis hits things off with him. Before they finally leave, Joel asks Alexis to write down her phone number on a napkin, but after she does, he brags about it to his friends. Alexis then learns that he knows exactly who she is and that he does not date freaks and tells her that it was just a bet to see if he could get her number. An irate Wilhelmina defends Alexis by punching Joel in the face. On their way back, Alexis thanks Wilhelmina for being there and is thankful that Daniel is on her side. But when Wilhelmina reminds Alexis that Daniel is the enemy, Alexis tells her that she is keeping Daniel as EIC and insists that Daniel is her brother, after which a furious Wilhelmina gets out of the car.

When Christina receives a call from Sarah Jessica Parker's people claiming that she saw her work at Fashion Week and that she wants Christina to design a dress for her by the next day, Christina cancels her plans with Betty to get the dress done. Later, Marc follows Wilhelmina's orders and goes to hang out with Christina where he ends up helping her with the dress. The two of them go around MODE trying to put together a dress with anything they can find. Wilhelmina shows up and tells Marc and Christina that they need a new plan because Alexis has changed her mind. Christina tells her that she is not one of her flying monkeys, but Wilhelmina quickly reminds her that she is and tells her that if it was not for her she would never have gotten noticed at fashion week. Later, Marc and Christina are alone again in the office when Sarah Jessica Parker's people call and tell her that they have changed their mind about the dress. Marc comforts a depressed Christina and reassures her that it will get easier.

As Betty stops by the cafeteria line she meets a new friend, Charlie. the two hit it off and even make plans to go to a party together, until Henry comes up and introduces Charlie to Betty as his girlfriend. Henry stops by to see Betty later at her desk and thanks her for getting Charlie to go out. He asks her if this is going to be weird, but she lies and insists that it will be fine. Amanda tells Betty that it is time to seize her inner MODE girl and suggests that she find Charlie's weakness and exploit it. As Betty and Charlie are walking out in the blizzard, Betty keeps seeing Amanda's face and hearing her voice, which keeps telling her to lose Charlie so she will be so scared enough to leave town. As Betty struggles with the voices, the crowd starts rushing in and out of the subway car and she lets go of Charlie's hand and the doors close, leaving Betty on the outside and Charlie on the inside. As the subway takes off Charlie screams out for Betty. Betty finally comes to her senses, prompting her to chase after the train screaming for Charlie to get off at the next stop. Henry shows up in a panic but assures Betty that this is not her fault but is shocked when she says that she thinks that she may have lost her on purpose. He tells her that he does not understand what Charlie did to her to make this happen. Betty then breaks down and tells Henry that she did not love Walter anymore and that she broke up with him. Henry tells her that now she will be able to find someone that sees how wonderful, kind and beautiful she is. But as they stare at each other and prepare to kiss, Charlie runs up and tells her that she loves New York and insists that it must have been fate that separated them tonight. Crushed, Betty gives the two tickets to Henry and Charlie.

At the Suarez home, Hilda cuts her father's hair as Justin stresses over a blizzard approaching the city that could threaten him getting to see Hairspray tonight. Ignacio tells Hilda that he does not know if inviting Santos to the musical is a good idea, but Hilda insists that Santos wants to spend to more time with his son. Later that evening, as Santos, Justin and Hilda hop on the subway to go to the show, Justin stresses even more when suddenly the power starts flickering and tells Hilda that he is mostly upset because his father is going to miss that wonderful experience. So Justin stands up, takes off his coat and puts on his own version of the 2003 Tony Award winner. All eyes in the subway car are on Justin until a man tells him that they have seen enough, which prompts Santos to stand up and tells him that he is going to let his son finish and that he had better clap when it is over.

Claire goes to see Bradford and tells him that she is going to turn herself in, but Bradford screams for her not to, but she insists that she has to. As she arrives home Daniel waits for her, having learned from Grace that Claire's blue Aston Martin was at the murder scene, just as Betty mentioned earlier.

== Awards ==
Rebecca Romijn submitted this episode for consideration in the category of "Outstanding Supporting Actress in a Comedy Series" on her behalf for the 2007 Emmy Awards. Lucy Liu also chose this episode for submission in consideration of her work in the category of "Outstanding Guest Actress in a Comedy Series".

== Contest ==
This episode was a tie-in with a contest in which Ashley Jensen's character, Christina, must come up a designer outfit that was created by viewers at home. The winning design was unveiled in this episode. On February 8, 2007 Ricardo Rodriguez of Fort Lauderdale, Florida was announced as the winner.

== Also starring ==
- Judith Light (Claire Meade)
- Christopher Gorham (Henry)
- Kevin Alejandro (Santos)
- Jayma Mays (Charlie)

== Guest stars ==
- Lucy Liu (Grace Chin)
- Jerry O'Connell (Joel)
