= Trust, Lust, and Must =

- Ugly Betty episode
- Ignacio speaks about the reasons why he didn't apply for an American Greencard
- Episode no.: Season 1 Episode 6
- Directed by: Jamie Babbit
- Written by: Cameron Litvack
- Production code: 107
- Original air date: November 2, 2006

Guest appearance
- Debi Mazar

Episode chronology
← Previous "The Lyin', the Watch and the Wardrobe"	Next → "After Hours"
- Ugly Betty season 1

"Trust, Lust, and Must" is an episode from the dramedy series Ugly Betty. In the United States, Canada and Australia, it aired as the sixth episode, but is actually the seventh overall. Written by Cameron Litvack and directed by James Babbitt, the episode first aired on November 2, 2006. It is executive producer Salma Hayek's first on-screen appearance on the series as a recurring regular outside her cameo from the telenovela scenes that appear on the episodes.

== Plot ==
Betty, Hilda and Ignacio consult with a lawyer on ways to keep Ignacio in the United States as Ignacio is asked about why he never applied for a green card or took up the amnesty program that was offered in 1986. Ignacio only states that "he was busy" and when the lawyer tells them that he will take up the case for only $20,000, the Suarezes know that they had their work cut out for them. While going through files and papers that could help their dad stay in the country, Betty and Hilda find a photo of their mother Rosa with part of the picture torn off but featured a hand of someone else. When Betty asked who it was, Ignacio is not in a good mood to tell her, only to say that was that it was a boyfriend of hers, which contradicts his claim that they were first time loves.

Despite that setback, Hilda suggests that she and a reluctant Betty sell Herbalux at MODE to solve their legal problems. While Betty struggles at selling Herbalux at work, she does take a closer look at the picture and tells Hilda that their mother has a wedding ring that dates back to 1975, but Hilda is too caught up in selling trying to sell the products in another part of town, where after a mêlée outside a gym she runs into a lawyer name Leah Stillman, who quickly bails her out of the argument. Leah then gives her a card if she needs to hire her.

Hilda decides to go to MODE personally to help her sister sell the stuff, of which they succeed in a big way, knowing that selling products at Meade Publications violates company rules as pointed out by Wilhelmina, who calls Betty into her office. As Wilhelmina asks Betty why she did it, Betty tells her it was to help her father. This prompts Wilhelmina to write a check for Betty on the condition that she sell out Daniel. After telling Hilda the consequences and later on in the evening after having a drink with Christina at the rack, Betty ponders what to do if she accepted the check, especially after arguing with her dad.

Wilhelmina has her own problems to deal with as her daughter Nico has arrived from boarding school and so far has stirred up trouble for her mother in an effort to get attention, and so far it has not worked: her shoplifting incident was quickly brushed under the rug and Wilhelmina wants to send Nico to boarding school in Paris. After a phone call to Fashion TV, Nico takes advantage of MODE's upcoming January 2007 issue by showing up in PETA-inspired clothing to criticize their support of fur, only to get upstaged by Wilhelmina wearing real fur and covering it up by telling everyone that this was a staged event to debate the war over wearing fur in the upcoming issue. A frustrated Nico then lashes out at Wilhelmina for not knowing how to be a mother to her own daughter, in front of Daniel, Betty, Amanda and Marc.

In the end, Betty decides not to cash the check and gives it back to Wilhelmina. She also apologizes to Ignacio for lashing out and wants to forget about the photo. But Ignacio decides to let his daughters know the truth about why he came to United States: the hand in the photo was that of their mother's first husband, Ramiro Vasquez, a banker that he had worked for as their cook. Ignacio and Rosa were in love but she could not escape Ramiro's abuse, so Ignacio beat him after Ramiro pulled a knife on him. He tells his daughters that if the authorities send him back to Mexico, he could face time in prison because he killed Ramiro in self-defense.

Wilhelmina also has a conversation with the mystery woman, who drops hints at what is to come, which is Fey's birthday, celebrated every year with Bradford. And as Bradford remembers the times that he had with Fey, it appears that the spirit of Fey is now haunting him. When he goes to the cemetery where her body lies in a tombed casket he notices someone who looks just like Fey watching him and before he can find out who it is the woman is gone. Even a security camera has no trace after his informant talks to him. That leaves Bradford to call someone who he feels may know what is going on.

Daniel's day at MODE begins with a conversation with Amanda, who is hoping that her chance with Daniel would be her dream come true, but Daniel brushes her off after he sees a hot and attractive Latina, so he follows her to the elevator, where after spilling her coffee on her dress he offers a chance to give her some clothes, but she assumed that he is trying to bed her, so she turns him down. Daniel will not give up until he finds out who the girl is. He finds out in a big way at a meeting of editor-in-chiefs in Bradford's office that this hard-to-get woman, best-selling author Sofia Reyes, is part of an upcoming new magazine that is being launched in 2007.

With Daniel now knowing her extensive background or lack of, he decides to apologize to Sofia, but the two seem to be playing hard-to-get since she is onto him but the sexual tension is obvious. The thought of Daniel having Sofia on his mind would carry into the bedroom after he slept with Amanda, who figured out that he still is not interested in her. The following day, Amanda goes to Daniel's office to apologize for taking his watch, but then says she will not waste her time going after him now that she sees Daniel as just a womanizer.

== Production ==
Marlene Favela and Sebastián Rulli appear in another telenovela scene from Vidas de Fuego, which continues the storyline that was seen in "The Box And The Bunny", that featured a pregnant housekeeper (Favela) who kisses a priest (Rulli), but in this one the housekeeper's sister (Sister Eva) used a soccer ball from her handsome player boyfriend to find out if the priest was the father of her sister's baby. After the soccer ball dropped from her belly, the father learned that he spilled the truth to the nun. The telenovela scene also featured English subtitles.

== Casting ==
Mark Indelicato, although credited, was absent from this episode.

== Reception ==
Entertainment Weekly's Allysa Lee notes "This episode of Ugly Betty was a must-see, if not for all the skeletons that emerged from the characters' closets, then for the flagrant use of the word must, as in Mode magazine's Must List for 2007. Or, as in our Must List, a concept the Betty writers blatantly stole. Don't know whether to tip our hat or tip off our lawyers on that one."

== Ratings ==
The episode was ranked 22nd with 13.62 million viewers in the United States tuning in

== Also starring ==
- Salma Hayek - Sofia Reyes
- Elizabeth Payne - Masked Lady
- Stelio Savante - Steve
- Jowharah Jones - Nico Slater
- Diane Cary - Bradford's Assistant

== Guest stars ==
- Debi Mazar - Leah Stillman
- Andy Milder - Lawyer
- Chris Damino - Gym Manager
- Alexis Krause - Hot Mode Girl
- Lauren Rose Lewis - Lara
- Lizzie Murray - Store Manager
- Allen Nabors - 1990 Fashion TV Host
- Rayan Raftery - Karaoke Singer
