= John Litvack =

American media executive (1945–2015)

- Born: May 25, 1945; Newton, Massachusetts, U.S.
- Died: March 21, 2015 (aged 69); Los Angeles, California, U.S.
- Education: Columbia University
- Occupation: Media executive
- Children: Cameron Litvack

John A. Litvack (May 25, 1945 – March 21, 2015) was an American television producer and media executive who was head of scheduling and programming for The WB network and earlier was an executive at CBS, NBC, MGM Television and Walt Disney Television. He was called the "dean of current programming".

== Early life and education ==
Litvack was born in Newton, Massachusetts, on May 25, 1945. He received a bachelor's degree from Columbia University in 1966.

== Career ==
He began his television career as a cue-card holder for the children's television series Captain Kangaroo.

He worked his way up in the network, becoming a director of television soap operas, including The Edge of Night, The Guiding Light, As the World Turns, and Search for Tomorrow, becoming director of daytime programs for CBS from 1975 to 1978. He was credited for credited with helping innovate the look of soap operas by making them look more cinematic.

From 1979 to 1981, Litvack was head of current programming at MGM Television. He was named vice president of current drama at NBC in 1981 and supervised shows, including Hill Street Blues, The A-Team, Miami Vice, St. Elsewhere, and Remington Steele. From 1986 to 1987, he worked at MTM Productions.

He joined Disney TV as senior vice president of current programming in 1989, working with Garth Ancier and Jordan Levin. He oversaw the development of shows, including The Golden Girls and Home Improvement, and helped develop the show Boy Meets World. He also helped start the Archive of American Television during this time.

From 1997 to 2004, Litvack was executive vice president, head of scheduling and current programming at The WB network. During that time, he oversaw the production of Dawson's Creek, Buffy the Vampire Slayer, 7th Heaven, Charmed, Felicity, Popular, Everwood and Smallville. He was credited by Variety for mentoring J. J. Abrams, Joss Whedon, Greg Berlanti on how to run television series.

Litvack was a co-executive producer of Hill Street Blues, Smallville, and consulting producer of Fringe.

== Personal life ==
Litvack was the father of Cameron Litvack. He died on March 21, 2015, following surgery complications at age 69.
