= Lillian Hurst =

Puerto Rican actress and comedian

Lillian Hurst (born August 13, 1943) is a Puerto Rican actress and comedian. She made her debut as a television comedian in the early-1960s. She has worked in film, stage and television productions in the United States.

== Early life ==
Hurst was born in the Villa Palmeras neighborhood of San Juan, Puerto Rico. Her father owned the "Farmacia Imperial" ("Imperial Pharmacy"), located in Barrio Obrero, Santurce. She received her primary and secondary education in San Juan, the capital. At an early age, she informed her parents that she wanted to be an actress. They soon enrolled her in Ana Santisteban's modeling academy. In 1960, when she was 17 years old, she was discovered by producer Gaspar Pumarejo.

== Career ==
In 1960, Hurst was contracted and she starred in the television comedy Pompilia y su Familia (Pompilia and her Family), which was broadcast on WAPA-TV. Later, she hosted La Hora del Niño (The Children's Hour) on Channel 6.

Some of the other comedies in which she participated in the 1960s were Casos y Cosas de la Casa (Cases and Things of the House) with actor Braulio Castillo and Matrimonio y Algo Más (Marriage and Something More). In 1969, Hurst was contracted by Panamericana de Television of Lima, Peru to work in the program El Hit del Momento (The Hit of the Moment), for one year.

When Hurst returned to Puerto Rico, she went to work in some of the programs produced by her cousin, Tommy Muñiz. She also participated in various theater productions for the first time. Among them were La Casa de las Hojas Azules (The House with the Blue Leaves) and La Verdadera Historia de Pedro Navaja (The True Story of Pedro Navaja). In 1980, Hurst wrote and produced a stage show which she presented at the Condado Beach Hotel in San Juan.

=== Career in the United States ===
Hurst went to New York City where she worked for a short time on some Off-Broadway productions. In 1989, she moved to Los Angeles, California. She also enrolled at Santa Monica College and majored in psychology. Hurst was able to work in both Spanish and English language productions. She landed a role as "Mrs. Maris" in Windows (1991), which was presented at the Taper Forum Theater, and as "Lola" in La Balada de Tina Juarez (The Ballad of Tina Juarez; 1992). She founded an acting school for Hispanic children.

=== Later years ===
Hurst has participated in twenty movies, including the 2005 film English as a Second Language. She has also made over thirty television guest appearances in programs such as JAG, NYPD Blue, The King of Queens, The X-Files, ER, Lost, True Blood and a recurring role in Dharma & Greg, where she played the role of "Celia" in sixteen episodes. She also appeared in the Ugly Betty episode "A Tree Grows in Guadalajara" as Yolanda Salazar, the grandmother of Betty Suarez. In 2009, she appeared on Nip/Tuck as Liz Cruz's mother, Mariela.

In 2016, she returned to Los Angeles and appeared in The Comeback and Fear the Walking Dead.

In March 2023 she joined the production of Getting Lost, an upcoming documentary about the TV show Lost.

== Filmography ==
=== Film ===
Year	Title	Role	Notes
1962	Romance in Puerto Rico	Celia	
1985	Amigos	Mirta	
1991	The Doctor	Mrs. Maris	
1994	A Million to Juan	Nosey Neighbor	
1995	Private Obsession	Estella	
1995	Sleepstalker	Old Woman	
1996	Brittle Glory	Mrs. Bell	
1998	Folle d'elle	Gradiosa	
1998	Melting Pot	Grandma Álvarez	
1999	Things I Forgot to Remember	Consuelo	
1999	Candyman 3: Day of the Dead	Flower Woman	
2000	Bread and Roses	Anna	
2001	Shooting LA	Grandma	
2002	Orange County	Lupe	
2002	Nightstalker	Thelma Martinez	
2004	Criminal	Mrs. Ochoa	
2005	English as a Second Language	Juanita	
2009	Not Forgotten	Hotel Manager	
2012	I Am a Director	Lillian	
2016	Yo Soy Un Político	Eneida	

=== Television ===
Year	Title	Role	Notes
1982	Fue sin querer	Fue sin querer	3 episodes
1988	Sesame Street	Mrs. Figueroa	2 episodes
1991	The Summer My Father Grew Up	Mrs. Gonzales	Television film
1992	From the Files of Joseph Wambaugh: A Jury of One	Mrs. Madrid	Television film
1993	Nurses	Mother	Episode: "Bring Me, the Head of Hank Kaplan"
1995	JAG	Sra. Escamilla	Episode: "War Crimes"
1996	NYPD Blue	Mrs. Marquez	Episode: "Hollie and the Blowfish"
1996	The Pretender	Bartender	Episode: "The Fly"
1997	The X-Files	Flakita	Episode: "El Mundo Gira"
1997	ER	Mrs. Landeta	Episode: "When the Bough Breaks"
1997–2001	Dharma & Greg	Celia	18 episodes
1999	Profiler	Mrs. Alvarez	Episode: "Heads, You Lose"
1999	L.A. Doctors	Maria Sandoval	Episode: "Immaculate Deception"
1999	Cracker	Housekeeper	Episode: "The Club"
1999	Mad About You	Phyllis	Episode: "The Final Frontier"
1999	The King of Queens	Maria	Episode: "Assaulted Nuts"
1999	My Little Assassin	Distraught Woman	Television film
2000	Seven Days	Teo's Mom	Episode: "The Cuban Missile"
2000	Ready to Run	Lourdes Ortiz	Television film
2001	Spyder Games	Grandmother	Episode #1.49
2002	George Lopez	Mrs. Cardenas	Episode: "Who's Your Daddy?"
2003	Cold Case	Bonita Rafael	Episode: "Look Again"
2003	Dragnet	Maria Ramos	Episode: "Coyote"
2003	Arrested Development	Luz	Episode: "Top Banana"
2004	Cracking Up	Dorsa	4 episodes
2005	Girlfriends	Concepcion Immaculata	2 episodes
2005–2010	Lost	Carmen Reyes	6 episodes
2005–2015	The Comeback	Esperanza	11 episodes
2006	Huff	Fellata	Episode: "Sweet Release"
2006	The Unit	Senora Berenguer	Episode: "Report by Exception"
2006–2007	The Nine	Consuela Hernandez	4 episodes
2007	Ugly Betty	Yolanda Salazar	Episode: "A Tree Grows in Guadalajara"
2007	Side Order of Life	Mathilda	2 episodes
2007	Reaper	Ben's Grandmother	Episode: "Ashes to Ashes"
2008	Azucar Morena	Mima	Television film
2009	Nip/Tuck	Mariela Cruz	Episode: "Allegra Caldarello"
2009	Lost: The Story of the Oceanic 6	Carmen Reyes	Television film
2010	True Blood	Great Aunt Cecilia	Episode: "I Smell a Rat"

== See also ==
- List of Puerto Ricans
