= In or Out =

- Ugly Betty episode
- Episode no.: Season 1 Episode 13
- Directed by: Michael Spiller
- Written by: Myra Jo Martino
- Production code: 113
- Original air date: January 18, 2007

Episode chronology
← Previous "Sofia's Choice"	Next → "I'm Coming Out"
- Ugly Betty season 1

"In or Out" is an episode from the dramedy series Ugly Betty, the thirteenth in the series overall, which aired on January 18, 2007. It was written by Myra Jo Martino and directed by Michael Spiller. The episode title itself is an allusion to the 1997 film In & Out.

== Plot ==
Following Sofia's deception, Betty is working as a waitress at a Mexican restaurant called Burrito King. When Betty remarks that she needs to pick up Daniel's dry cleaning and run a few errands for him, Hilda points out that she is not his assistant anymore, but Betty says she needs to look out for him. Betty later discovers a disheveled and depressed Daniel hiding out in his dirty apartment, having told everyone he was in Rio to save himself some embarrassment. She tells him next week is Fashion Week and the company needs him. Daniel is relieved to learn that Betty quit her MYW job with Sofia, and rehires her as his assistant.

The next morning, while Betty and her family have breakfast, Betty discusses with Hilda whether she should pursue a new relationship with Henry at MODE or settle down into a future with Walter. Betty then meets Daniel on the way to work, where Daniel is unsettled to see posters of MYW's first issue, featuring Sofia's article plastered on buses and walls, complete with the Daniel-Sofia cover shot. Betty reminds Daniel that he can do this; he can go to work and survive if he runs into Sofia. Daniel takes Betty and Amanda into his office and tells them they are both going to be his assistants.

At the Wilmont Clinic, Wilhelmina and the mystery woman are informed by Steve, the private eye Wilhelmina hired, that the price is $1,000,000 to make it look like Bradford is responsible for Fey's death. The mystery woman insists to Wilhelmina that they have to move quickly once she pays the money and that Wilhelmina must eliminate anyone she does not trust at MODE. Wilhelmina then returns to her office and discusses with Marc who is in and who is out at MODE. She opens her secret compartment with pictures of MODE's employees, half of whom are placed on a side labeled "In" and half are on the side labeled "Out". Christina is placed on the center line, not quite "In" or "Out" because Wilhelmina does not know if she can trust her despite her having worked as her seamstress. Amanda is "Out" because Wilhelmina sees her as loyal to Daniel and believes that Amanda must prove her loyalty to her to get "In".

At MODE, Betty tells Amanda that they have to build up Daniel's confidence again and take his mind off Sofia. Betty tells Amanda to put 8pm on Daniel's calendar for that night, and then goes to Christina to search for a new date. Betty takes Christina's advice and contacts supermodel Gisele Bündchen's people to arrange a dinner date for her and Daniel. Daniel tells Betty he is not ready to be set up with anyone yet, but Betty tells him that the tabloids need to see him on the arm of a supermodel. Marc tells Amanda she needs to sabotage both Betty and Daniel to prove her loyalty to Wilhelmina, and shows Amanda the secret bulletin board in Wilhelmina's office, with Amanda on the "Out" list. Amanda is conflicted on whether to betray Daniel, but when Marc tells Amanda that Daniel will always choose Betty over her, Amanda tells him she is on the team that is staying. Impersonating Betty, she calls Gisele's people to cancel the date.

While Daniel waits at the restaurant for his date, everyone in the restaurant stares and paparazzi take pictures from outside. Daniel calls Betty and tells her Gisele has not shown up. Betty rushes to the rescue and takes a seat at Daniel's table, telling him that as far as the tabloids know, he is just meeting with his assistant to discuss her raise. Daniel and Betty manage to lose the paparazzi on the streets of Brooklyn and duck into a cozy pizza restaurant. Betty tells Daniel that he is a much better person now because he was ready to put his heart out there for the right woman; she says she wishes she could feel that way. Daniel says it is obvious that Henry is really into her. Betty then coaxes a reluctant Daniel onstage to sing karaoke with her, and they do a duet of "I Got You Babe" together.

Walking across the Brooklyn Bridge, they stop to admire the Manhattan night skyline, and then talk about Daniel's late brother, Alex. Daniel opens up to Betty about how Alex used to call Daniel and have him meet at some after-hours diner to just hang out and talk, much like he and Betty are doing. Betty gently asks how Alex died, and Daniel says he jumped out of a helicopter to ski on Mt. Juneau, but says at least Alex lived an exciting life. Betty tells Daniel she cannot be with Henry since she saw him kissing Daniel's ex-girlfriend Aerin at the company Christmas party, and feels overshadowed by her. Daniel reassures Betty that she does not need to worry about Aerin, because she casually kissed six men at the party.

The next morning, a surprised Amanda sees the paper with pictures of Betty and Daniel at the restaurant. When Betty comes in, Amanda shows her to her new, larger desk and admits that she and Betty have one thing in common: they both want what is best for Daniel. Betty will be Daniel's only assistant, and Amanda asks Daniel for her old job back, along with a raise.

Hilda learns that Herbalux has been recalled by the FDA, leaving her unemployed. When she listens to a voicemail from Justin's teacher, thanking her for the cupcakes that Ignacio made and insisting there is money in them, Hilda then starts her own bakery, Grandma Suarez's Cupcakes, and receives an order from a diner for 500 cupcakes for the next morning. She forces Ignacio, Justin and a Chinese neighbor to work all day on the cupcakes, resulting in her earning $181, which Ignacio later points out is not enough to cover the equipment and supplies they bought. When the diner doubles their order for the next day, an exhausted Ignacio refuses to help, so Hilda stays up all night working on the cupcakes herself, only to accidentally burn them. Hilda then complains to Betty how she does not have anything to show for herself at 30; though Justin is the best thing that has ever happened to her, she cannot help but wonder what her life would be like if she was not a single mother, which Justin overhears. Betty tells Hilda that she is a super mom and that this was meant to happen so that she could go on to bigger and better things.

Wilhelmina gets a delivery with all the information needed to frame Bradford for Fey's death. They mystery lady tells her this must be taken to the police by someone with no connection to Wilhelmina. Back at her office, Wilhelmina looks at the "In" and "Out" board and sets her sights on Christina. For years, Christina has submitted her own designs for Fashion Week, but Wilhelmina, who selects the final designs, has never picked her. Wilhelmina goes downstairs and tries to butter Christina up by telling her that if she does favors for the right people, she could make it as a designer. Christina, knowing how Wilhelmina works, says that she would rather make it on her own. However, Christina later reconsiders and reluctantly agrees to help Wilhelmina in exchange for possible recognition as a designer. Wilhelmina hands Christina the package and tells her to drop it off anonymously at the nearest police station. Wilhelmina then goes to the clinic to see the mystery lady and tells her the package is being delivered as they speak. The mystery lady then walks out of the shadows, with all of her bandages removed, wearing a stunning dress. As she poses in the mirror, the woman asks Wilhelmina how she looks. Wilhelmina compliments "Alex Meade" on her "skiing accident". The woman smiles at Wilhelmina and tells her to call her "Alexis".

== Production ==
This episode introduces Rebecca Romijn to the cast as a series regular. She took over the role of the masked woman, who is actually Daniel's brother, Alex Meade, who was supposedly dead. Alex, upon her sex change, changes her name to "Alexis". The episode also marks one of the few times that a post-operative transgender character has been a full-time regular, and the third in prime time, the others being The Education of Max Bickford and the short lived 1986 NBC series The Last Precinct, which featured the character of Officer Mel Brubaker, portrayed by Randi Brooks. In an interview with TV Guide, Silvio Horta explained the reason behind this surprising twist involving Alexis: "While we were shooting the pilot," he explains, "I got to the point where Wilhelmina screws Daniel over, and I felt at the end it just needed something else. Something bigger. So I wrote a scene between her and a mysterious woman."

When Amanda placed a picture of herself on the "In" part on Wilhelmina's "In or Out" board, she placed it on the right of Marc. A couple of scenes later, when Wilhelmina was on the phone to "The Mystery Woman" she looks at the board. It can be seen from this camera angle that the picture of Amanda is back on the "Out" section, and the space next to Marc is no longer occupied by Amanda. Betty was already placed on "Out" on Wilhelmina's "In or Out" board, well before she came back to her job as Daniel Meade's assistant.

In this episode, Daniel sprays fake tan on himself to make him look like he's been away. When he returns to work he hugs Wilhelmina and makes orange hand marks on her back. Later on in the episode when Wilhelmina is in the closet with Christina the orange marks are gone from Wilhelmina's back however she is wearing the same white outfit.

The restaurant where Betty was "chip chick" was the El Coyote Restaurant on Beverly Blvd. near Hollywood, in Los Angeles.

The karaoke scene and the walk across the bridge featuring Betty and Daniel followed the same storyline setting as Betty la Fea, but the outcome was different in the original version. This scene was also documented in the first season DVD, where both America Ferrera and Eric Mabius are actually shooting on a green set that is later digitized to make it look like Brooklyn Bridge and the Manhattan skyline.

The props department created a newspaper for the character Amanda to read after Daniel and Betty's night out featuring the front-page headline "Man Brutally Attacked by Pigeons In Central Park : Lives To Tell Gruesome Tale".

== Casting ==
This episode was also the final one featuring Stelio Savante's character Steve.

== Awards ==
Eric Mabius submitted this episode for consideration in the category of "Outstanding Supporting Actor in a Comedy Series" on his behalf for the 2007 Emmy Awards.

== Ratings ==
The episode was watched by 14.1 million viewers in the United States. The surge came in the wake of the series' win at the Golden Globes on January 16, three days earlier.

== Also starring ==
- Stelio Savante (Steve)

== Guest stars ==
- Kathy Griffin (Fashion TV reporter)
- Shelly Desai (Jorge)
- Robert Thorne (Maitre d')
- Josh Kelly (Busboy)
- Hope Shapiro (Bald Woman on TV)
- Ralph P. Martin (Large Italian Singing Man)
