= Secretaries' Day (Ugly Betty) =

- Ugly Betty episode
- Betty riding the bull to win money for her fathers flight ticket
- Episode no.: Season 1 Episode 21
- Directed by: Victor Nelli, Jr.
- Written by: Henry Alonso Myers
- Production code: 121
- Original air date: May 3, 2007

Episode chronology
← Previous "Petra-Gate"	Next → "A Tree Grows in Guadalajara"
- Ugly Betty season 1

"Secretaries' Day" is the 21st episode from the dramedy series Ugly Betty, which aired on May 3, 2007. The episode was written by Henry Alonso Myers and directed by Victor Nelli, Jr.

== Plot ==
Betty and Hilda struggle with a dilemma; Ignacio needs to return to Mexico and apply for his visa so he can re-enter the country legally and apply for citizenship. However, the fare isn't cheap. Betty is also juggling with the task of planning MODE's big assistants' week, "Administrative Professionals' Day", or, as she prefers to call it, "Secretaries' Day". Betty has planned the party at The Middle Ages, a medieval-themed restaurant.

Later, at MODE, Betty talks to Daniel about his problems with sexual addiction and recommends ways for him to seek help. Betty brings in Tyler, a writer for Psychology Now, to help him, but Daniel refuses. Frustrated, he turns to Tyler, who passes him some pills to take every time he is tempted to have sex.

Everyone is looking forward going to The Middle Ages, except Amanda, who shows her displeasure by making the MODE staff miserable. It turns out she used to be an actress and did an embarrassing commercial for The Middle Ages that gets played on a loop near the entrance. She is afraid the other assistants will make fun of her, but when they arrive, she notices she was replaced in the video by a younger actress. Amanda gets upset and goes on an eating binge. The young actress later appears, saying her performance was an homage to Amanda's.

Meanwhile, Betty is still worried about the money for Ignacio's ticket. To get it, she decides to ride the restaurant's mechanical steed. She almost wins, but Nick throws something at her and she gets knocked out. Furious, Henry challenges Nick to a joust. Unfortunately, Henry loses and says "I love you" to Betty right before passing out. Charlie arrives, sees Betty trying to wake Henry up and gets upset. She tells Betty to back off and takes Henry home. Christina tries to console Betty, who is confused and distraught. Nick starts mocking her, but Betty defends herself by hitting him with a jousting staff. The following day, Betty gets a lot of respect from everyone at work for putting Nick in his place.

Alexis's relationship with Rodrigo continues going well, until she overhears him on the phone and finds out Bradford paid Rodrigo to seduce her and get her out of the country. Alexis decides to leave Rodrigo and, as the door to his hotel room shuts, she collapses sobbing on the floor. The next day, she makes a phone call to ask about a problem she needs "eliminated", as she tears up a picture of Alex and Bradford.

Meanwhile, Hilda has problems with her teacher at the cosmetology school. She constantly criticizes Hilda on her looks and technique, prompting her to quit before the final. But thanks to advice from Justin and Ignacio, Hilda returns to school, faces her teacher, and passes the test.

Finally, Wilhelmina prepares for her plan to take over MODE and Meade Publications. She goes to prison to visit Claire, who threatens to tell people about her affair with Bradford. Later in the evening, Wilhelmina calls Marc to come to the Meade Building. In the stairwell, she asks Marc to punch her until she gets bruises. Marc is unsure at first, but ends up complying, making her tumble down the stairs. The next day, she tells Bradford that Claire hired three thugs to beat her up. Bradford decides to divorce Claire.

The day after the party, Daniel surprises Betty with first class tickets to Mexico for her whole family, saying he was a thoughtless boss. Betty is overcome with emotion and thanks Daniel with a hug. After she tells the family the good news, a model arrives, and smiles at Daniel, who takes a pill, as it appears that he may have moved on to a new addiction.

== Production ==
This is the second episode in which stuntperson Anna Mercedes Morris would appear as a stunt double for America Ferrera's character in the scene when Betty was riding the mechanical bull. In addition, viewers hear Henry's last name, Grubstick, for the first time. Also, Lorraine Toussaint starts her recurring role as Amelia "Yoga" Bluman in this episode.

The episode also offered another showcase for actress Becki Newton who was interviewed in TV Guide the week this episode aired. Another clarification would be her character's last name. Originally thought to have been 'Tanner', Amanda's last name is revealed to be 'Tanen', as shown on the computer screen during her acting reel that she shows Marc. In addition, The Middle Ages restaurant commercial is also a reference to Newton appearing in an Olive Garden commercial, which she did before joining "Ugly Betty." The Middle Ages is also a spoof of the Medieval Times chain.

== Reception ==
In a review from Entertainment Weekly, Tanner Stransky wrote "Week after week, Ugly Betty continues to top itself. I mean, you gotta love an episode that features an Administrative Professionals Day party at a medieval-themed restaurant in Times Square (complete with a robotic horse); footage of Mandypants (a.k.a. Amanda) as a phone-sex operator, a bar wench, and a slutty nurse; and Claire Meade dishing with her transsexual daughter about the hotness of Brazilian men. It's like the guts of three Lifetime movies smashed together. But witty! And pretty! And addictive!"

The Recapist also echoed the same sentiments in their review.

== Ratings ==
The episode was watched by 10.7 million viewers in the United States, an increase from the previous episode.

== Also starring ==
- Judith Light (Claire Meade)
- Christopher Gorham (Henry Grubstick)
- Jayma Mays (Charlie)
- Max Greenfield (Nick Pepper)

== Guest stars ==
- Cristian de la Fuente (Rodrigo)
- Maria Costa (Valerie)
- David Noroña (Tyler Blake)
- Rachel Roberts (Marla)
- Shayna Rose (Replacement Serving Wench)
- Jonathan Slavin (Squire Josh Weinstock)
- Lorraine Toussaint (Yoga)
- Joe Duer (Dr. Lorenzo)
