= The Lyin', the Watch and the Wardrobe =

- Ugly Betty episode
- Marc in his "Betty" Halloween costume
- Episode no.: Season 1 Episode 5
- Directed by: Rodman Flender
- Written by: Donald Todd
- Production code: 106
- Original air date: October 26, 2006

Episode chronology
← Previous "Fey's Sleigh Ride"	Next → "Trust, Lust, and Must"
- Ugly Betty season 1

"The Lyin', the Watch and the Wardrobe" is the fifth broadcast episode of the American comedy-drama series Ugly Betty (sixth overall). It aired on October 26, 2006. The title is a play on The Lion, the Witch and the Wardrobe from The Chronicles of Narnia.

== Plot ==
On Halloween, Betty arrives at work in costume after being misled by a prank email from Marc. Daniel asks her to retrieve his expensive watch, which he left at a former girlfriend’s apartment but cannot identify. Betty eventually discovers that Amanda has the watch and confronts her. Amanda admits that she has feelings for Daniel but knows they will never be reciprocated and gives the watch back.

Meanwhile, Betty develops an interest in Henry from accounting, which creates tension with her boyfriend Walter. After a confrontation between the two men, Betty decides to continue her relationship with Walter, although their future remains uncertain.

Daniel visits his mother Claire at a rehabilitation clinic and learns new details about Bradford’s long-term affair with Fey Sommers. Claire reveals that she and Fey confronted Bradford shortly before Fey’s death. Daniel later confronts his father, who expresses regret but denies responsibility for the events.

Wilhelmina struggles with public criticism for dating a younger man and works with Christina to maintain her image. She continues her secret communication with the mysterious woman connected to Fey’s disappearance.

The episode ends with Betty confronting Ignacio about inconsistencies in his identity documents. He admits that he entered the United States illegally, leaving Betty shocked by the revelation.

== Production ==
This episode was originally produced as the sixth of the season but aired earlier after the postponement of "Swag". It marked the first appearance of Judith Light as Claire Meade. Producer Silvio Horta had previously worked with Light on an unaired pilot and wrote the role specifically for her.

== Reception ==
Entertainment Weekly critic Michael Slezak praised the episode for its use of Halloween as a thematic device to explore the characters’ hidden identities and emotional conflicts.

== Awards ==
The episode was submitted for consideration in the category of "Outstanding Writing for a Comedy Series" for the 59th Primetime Emmy Awards. Tony Plana also submitted this episode for consideration for "Outstanding Supporting Actor in a Comedy Series".

== Also starring ==
- Michael Urie as Marc St. James
- Kevin Sussman as Walter
- Christopher Gorham as Henry Grubstick
- Judith Light as Claire Meade
- Elizabeth Payne as the masked woman
- Stelio Savante as Steve
- Jowharah Jones as Nico Slater

== Guest stars ==
- Patrick Fabian as Fashion TV anchor
- Alison McAtee as Friday Night
- Tasha Taylor as Thursday Night
- Jean-Christophe Febbrari as waiter
- Amanda Lockwood as MODE girl
- Jesse Marchant as Jason
- Jeanne Simpson as receptionist
