= Lose the Boss =

- Ugly Betty episode
- Episode no.: Season 1 Episode 9
- Directed by: Ken Whittingham
- Written by: Oliver Goldstick
- Production code: 110
- Original air date: November 23, 2006

Guest appearance
- Salma Hayek

Episode chronology
| ← Previous "Four Thanksgivings and a Funeral" | Next → "Fake Plastic Snow" |
- Ugly Betty season 1

"Lose the Boss" is the ninth episode of the American comedy-drama television series Ugly Betty. It originally aired on November 23, 2006, on ABC. The episode was written by Oliver Goldstick and directed by Ken Whittingham. The title is a pun on the sitcom Who's the Boss?.

== Plot ==
Following Thanksgiving, Daniel Meade is left devastated after Sofia Reyes leaves him for her fiancé. He avoids returning to work and instead spends the day at Betty Suarez's home, where he bonds with her family and reflects on his troubled upbringing.

At MODE, Bradford Meade becomes concerned about an upcoming exclusive photo shoot of a celebrity couple's newborn. With Daniel absent, Betty is forced to take increasing responsibility for organizing the project, while struggling with an uncooperative stylist and Sofia's unexpected involvement.

Meanwhile, Wilhelmina Slater and her assistant Marc St. James find themselves in trouble after their recent schemes backfire. Stranded while attempting to manage the situation, Wilhelmina admits her growing frustration over constantly having to compensate for Daniel's incompetence, while Marc begins to realize the risks of remaining loyal to her.

As tensions rise, Betty proposes a new creative concept for the photo shoot and gains confidence in her abilities. Daniel, encouraged by Betty's family, eventually confronts Sofia and asks for another chance. Sofia agrees to reconsider their relationship.

The episode concludes with Daniel reconciling with Sofia and encouraging Betty to pursue a new job opportunity she has been offered. However, the hopeful tone is undermined when immigration officers arrive at the Suarez household and arrest Ignacio, abruptly ending the family's celebration.

== Reception ==
Entertainment Weekly critic Michael Slezak praised the episode, calling it one of the funniest of the series’ early run and highlighting the strength of the ensemble cast.

== Ratings ==
"Lose the Boss" was the lowest-rated episode of the first season, ranking 48th for the week with 8.74 million viewers in the United States.

== Also starring ==
- Kevin Alejandro as Santos
- Salma Hayek as Sofia Reyes

== Guest stars ==
- Isaac Mizrahi as himself
