= Punch Out (Ugly Betty) =

- Ugly Betty episode
- Quincy and Wilhelmina
- Episode no.: Season 1 Episode 19
- Directed by: Miguel Arteta
- Written by: Oliver Goldstick
- Production code: 119
- Original air date: 19 April 2007

Guest appearance
- Leslie Jordan as Quincy Combs

Episode chronology
← Previous "Don't Ask, Don't Tell"	Next → "Petra-Gate"
- Ugly Betty season 1

"Punch Out" (also known as "Why Do You Want to Treat Me So Bad?") is the 19th episode from the dramedy series Ugly Betty, which aired on April 19, 2007. The episode was written by Oliver Goldstick and produced by Miguel Arteta.

== Plot ==
As the day begins, Betty frantically tries to keep Daniel focused on work, but it appears that he is more preoccupied with sleeping with women and has reverted to his old hard-partying ways. Betty also notices author Quincy Combs (Leslie Jordan) in Daniel's office, looking to dig up dirt about the Meade family. Betty tells Quincy that he is wasting his time but Quincy isn't buying Betty's threats.

Christina thinks Betty is too focused on Daniel, so she shares with her an invitation Wihelmina gave her to a new night club. At the club, Betty tries to loosen up but it's not working. She later sees Daniel and Becks partying and flirting with a young model, Petra, and her sister, Lena. She also thinks she sees Quincy stalking Daniel and tries to warn him by taking a microphone from the DJ booth. Quincy turns out to not be there and Daniel, upset over being embarrassed by Betty, starts berating her in front of everyone. Later, she learns from Christina about her "deal" with Wilhelmina and how she got the invitation, which results in Betty ending her friendship with the only person she ever trusted at MODE.

Meanwhile, Quincy stalks the Meades and Alexis schemes to get her hands on the diaries. Wilhelmina also hunts for them, as Quincy claims that the last six months of her life were detailed in the hidden set. Alexis tries to use the diaries to manipulate Bradford, but Wilhemina beats her to it. She gave Quincy pictures of Alexis in exchange for information on how to seduce Bradford. She succeeds in winning Bradford over and stops him from receiving Alexis's calls.

Meanwhile, Ignacio feels the heat when Constance pressures him to make their relationship a romantic one. He is not attracted to her, but knows that her demands stands in the way of him obtaining a green card. So despite warnings by Hilda not to go, Ignacio believes it's the only way he can see the lawyer that Constance hired for him. When he arrives to Constance's apartment, he discovers that Constance tricked him; she never called the lawyer and used this evening to lure him into marrying him.

Hours later, Hilda is visited by Ignacio's real caseworker. Hilda learns from him that Constance was fired two months earlier, prompting Hilda to go to Constance's place after she warns Ignacio. As she arrives and prepares to confront her, Ignacio tells Hilda that Constance isn't a bad person; she had her heart broken, so he decides not to turn her in and forgives her.

Back at Daniel's apartment, Daniel is having sex with Petra. But Lena comes in to drop a bombshell: Petra is actually 16 and her "sister" Lena is actually her mother. She extorts him into putting her daughter on the cover of MODE and he finds himself wondering what he should do to get himself out of this situation. He calls Betty, who, still upset over Daniel's actions at the club towards her, tells Ignacio to give him a message: she just "punched out".

== Production ==
The episode's original title was Footloose and Meade-Free.

It is also the last episode that recurring regular Octavia Spencer appears as Constance Grady. Both Spencer and Leslie Jordan submitted this episode for consideration of their work in the categories of "Outstanding Guest Actress in a Comedy Series" and "Outstanding Guest Actor in a Comedy Series" respectively for the 2007 Emmy Awards.

== Music notes ==
The song that is playing when Betty chooses clothes is "Here I Come" by Fergie.

The songs that are playing when Betty's in the club are "Glamorous" by Fergie, Running Away by "Space Cowboy" and a dance remix of "Grace Kelly" by Mika. Mika would later rewrite one of his songs, "Big Girl (You Are Beautiful)", for the show's second-season promos.

== Reception ==
There were a lot of criticism from viewers involving the underage storyline as noted in a Q&A message to TV Guide's Matt Roush.

== Also starring ==
- Octavia Spencer (Constance Grady)
- Max Greenfield (Nick Pepper)
- Bailey Chase (Becks)

== Guest stars ==
- Leslie Jordan (Quincy Combs)
- Ivana Miličević (Lena)
- AnnaLynne McCord (Petra)
- Eric Edelstein (Ben)
- Jeff Meacham (Kevin)
