= Petra-Gate =

- Ugly Betty episode
- Petra and her "Mother" blackmail Daniel
- Episode no.: Season 1 Episode 20
- Directed by: Paul Lazarus
- Written by: Gabrielle Stanton & Harry Werksman
- Production code: 120
- Original air date: 26 April 2007

Episode chronology
← Previous "Punch Out"	Next → "Secretaries' Day"
- Ugly Betty season 1

"Petra-Gate" is the 20th episode from the dramedy series Ugly Betty, which aired on April 26, 2007. The episode was co-written by Gabrielle Stanton and Harry Werksman and directed by Paul Lazarus.

== Plot ==
After seeing her working relationship with Daniel, her close friendship with Christina, and her chance to date Henry all fall apart, Betty is left with no choice but to turn her back on all three, this after Daniel tries to ask her about Petra, sees Henry and Charlie argue while trying to get a bagel, and rebuffs Christina's attempts to apologize, followed by Hilda climbing into Betty's room after a night out with Santos, which is also noticed the following day by Ignacio after he brought it up. Betty, however, starts to realize that she needs them in her life after all and thinks about whether she should forgive them. Hilda and Justin strongly advise her to, recalling a similar situation when Betty's high school friend, Trina DiPaolo, bailed on their "anti-prom" night after she got asked to the prom.

Daniel's aftermath of sleeping with Petra and being blackmailed by Lena forces him to either pay them off or relinquish his EIC job to Alexis. This prompts Henry to question him about a $75,000 check just to pay them off. Henry tells Betty about this, and the two begin to become suspicious of Petra. It appears that earlier in the day Betty saw Petra buy cigarettes after bumping into each other. As Betty confronts Daniel over this and for not trusting her, Daniel finally admits that he made a mistake and decides that he will hand over his editor-in-chief (EIC) duties to Alexis. But just as Daniel is about to sign his EIC duties away, Betty remembers Petra buying cigarettes at the stand, which prompts her and Henry to snatch Petra's ID and find out her real age: 20. When Daniel and Alexis see this, he tears up the contract and remains co-EIC. While Betty might have saved Daniel's job, she is concerned that he has not changed as he heads towards the elevator to go home. And as expected, Betty finds herself back at the center of Henry's attention and the two celebrate their latest victory. As they look at each other, they are unaware that Charlie has walked in and seen them together.

Betty also reconciles with Christina, who offers her info on Wilhelmina's schemes. Betty also decides to forgive her former high school friend, and arranges an outing with Trina.

Meanwhile, romance is in the air as Alexis catches the attention of Rodrigo, creative director at MODE Brazil and he asks her out. He is also aware of her being a post-op and to him it does not matter anyway. After Wilhelmina tells her that it is time to "put the key in the ignition", Alexis finally goes out with Rodrigo, and later on in the evening the two have sex. The following day, Rodrigo invites Alexis to come to Brazil with him, an offer that may prove to be tempting. Unbeknownst to Alexis, Rodrigo is being paid off by Bradford and Wilhelmina (who suggested the idea to him as a way to get back at "Little Orphan Tranny"), in exchange for promoting Rodrigo to the EIC job at MODE Brazil by getting Alexis out of the country. This after Bradford offered her $10 million to resign from MODE, leave town, and let Daniel once again take the position of editor-in-chief, which Alexis turned down.

Wilhelmina steps up her plot to lure Bradford in and acquires fake Viagra pills from Marc. Bradford reminds her that he will not divorce Claire, but it looks like the "pills" he took might be working, and Wilhelmina seems to be pleased.

Amanda flirts with Tavares, a designer who she believes is gay, after she falls for his exciting fashions, which impresses even Wilhelmina, who turned him away earlier. But as Amanda falls head over heels for him and his designs, she discovers that he is actually a straight guy and that he is using this ruse just to get his designs noticed, which gives Amanda an idea to help him, even as she falls for him.

Over at the Suarezes', Santos asks Hilda to marry him, and she accepts. Justin is happy that Santos finally proposed to his mother, but Ignacio refuses to accept Santos into the family because of his past experiences. However, Ignacio receives a call from his caseworker, informing him that he will have to return to Mexico.

== Production ==
The scene where Betty sees Petra buy cigarettes at the newsstand is actually Downtown Los Angeles; a Los Angeles County MTA bus can be spotted in the background. Also, When Betty enters Daniel's office after discovering that Petra was not 16, you could see the camera through the window's reflection (the window on the right).

In this episode, we learned that Henry is a fan of the soap opera All My Children, which is also produced by ABC. However, when he referenced trivia about Erica Kane's daughter Kendall Hart going after Erica's fourth husband (when Erica was a Chandler at the time), Henry was off by two: Kendall was going after Erica's sixth husband (which was Dimitri Marick).

The episode also had the working titles "Why You Wanna Treat Me So Bad?" and "Petra-Fined."

== Reception ==
Although Entertainment Weekly's Karen Leigh gave the episode high marks, she notes "Still, I have a major problem with the fact that so many of its characters — Bradford, Walter, even Amanda — are totally cardboard. We do get the rare bit of compassion or sadness from them (witness Marc's coming out to Mama LuPone), but though I think they're funny, when I compare them with fleshed-out Betty, Henry, Daniel, and even Wilhelmina, I can't help thinking that Betty's often fluffy story lines would benefit if these people had a little more soul."

== Also starring ==
- Judith Light (Claire Meade)
- Christopher Gorham (Henry Grubstick)
- Kevin Alejandro (Santos)
- Jayma Mays (Charlie)

== Guest stars ==
- Cristian de la Fuente (Rodrigo)
- Mykel Shannon-Jenkins (Tavares)
- AnnaLynne McCord (Petra)
- Ivana Miličević (Lena)
- Rachel Style (Trina DiPaolo)
- Andrew Reville (Student)
