= Four Thanksgivings and a Funeral =

- Ugly Betty episode
- Episode no.: Season 1 Episode 8
- Directed by: Sarah Pia Anderson
- Written by: Marco Pennette
- Production code: 109
- Original air date: November 16, 2006

Guest appearances
- Salma Hayek; Martha Stewart

Episode chronology
← Previous "After Hours"	Next → "Lose the Boss"
- Ugly Betty season 1

"Four Thanksgivings and a Funeral" is an episode from the dramedy (drama-comedy) series Ugly Betty, which aired on November 16, 2006. In the United States, Canada and Australia, it is the eighth episode, but it's the ninth overall and was written by Marco Pennette and directed by Sarah Pia Anderson. This episode's title is a pun of the film Four Weddings and a Funeral.

== Plot ==
As Thanksgiving Day approaches, it appears that everyone has plans that are about to go awry, in more ways than one.

Betty finds herself waiting for Daniel to let her go home so she can fix dinner, but it appears that her multi-tasking is causing a rift with the family. Hilda and Ignacio are upset that she didn't come home earlier to meet Leah, who has agreed to represent Ignacio, and Justin is upset that she missed his school play. But before Daniel let her go for the evening, Betty noticed that Daniel still has feelings for Sofia, since he was still waiting for her to call him back and he had to spend Thanksgiving Dinner with Bradford and Claire. After she gives Daniel a little pep talk Sofia suddenly shows up and tells her that will be at Meades' get together and wants Daniel to meet her boyfriend Hunter. That prompted Daniel to change his mind quickly.

As Betty prepares to return home she runs into Gina, who seems to know all about Ignacio's problems but warned Betty that Leah is not to be trusted because not only she has ripped off other people who asked for her help but has scammed them out of their money after making promises. After Betty returned home she gets the third degree from Hilda about neglecting the family at a time of crisis, especially at a holiday, where the guests include Christina, Santos and Walter. For Santos, he comes bearing gifts for Justin by giving him a New York Jets jersey and a cup that Justin mistakes for a mask to which he says he is the Phantom of the Opera. Santos also seemed to have buried the hatchet with Ignacio for now. Betty at first shrugged it off but after meeting Leah at the house she tells Hilda that she is not so sure that she should give money to her.

However, the family discord continues on Thanksgiving Day when Betty gets a call from Daniel, thus disrupting the gathering. As she travels crosstown to Daniel's apartment, she finds out the reason why he asked her to come over, and that was to help him pick out a shirt. Betty, upset over that, told Daniel that he should figure things out for himself if really cares about Sofia and gives him more pep talk before returning home, but before she does Betty decided to do a little investigating by visiting the last person Leah saw, a woman who was promised that she would get her children back but never did, and told Betty that it would happen on Thanksgiving. After returning home and seeing Leah, Betty asks Hilda to talk to her in private and told her not to go through with it. But Hilda refused to listen and accused Betty of not being around for the family.

Meanwhile, Daniel does go to the country club where he sees a sober Claire and Bradford finally make peace for now. But Daniel was more concentrated on Sofia, who brought along a handsome blonde, the aforementioned Hunter, who happens to be a Peace Corps worker. Daniel figures that Hunter is his competition for Sofia, so when Hunter is invited to go dancing by Sofia even after admitting to her that he is not a great dancer, Daniel insists on coming along and Sofia agrees. However Daniel didn't expect it would be a Salsa Club, so he once again calls Betty for mambo lessons, but as he was about to make his move on Sofia, Hunter shows up and sweeps Sofia off her feet and then told Daniel that he was a ballroom champion back in 1988 but gave it up. Defeated, Daniel decided that he can't compete with Hunter and when Sofia came out to talk to him Daniel asked if she had feelings for him. Sofia responded by saying yes and that he asked her to marry him. That was all the answer Daniel needed and as she left he wanted to go somewhere to be left alone.

As for Bradford, it appears that the festivities are starting to warm up in more ways than one. While he went to another part of the room he saw what looked like Fey Sommers and thought he was seeing things but couldn't convince Claire, who thought he was the one with a drinking problem. After that melee he called someone to meet him at Fey's tomb. At the cemetery Bradford confronted Steve and showed him the empty casket, then put two and two together: It appears that Steve is working for the masked woman, so Bradford took care of that by telling Steve his services are no longer needed, permanently...thanks to a new replacement.

For Wilhelmina, she learned that Nico was visiting for the holiday even though Wils had other plans. So she cancels them to do something special for her and Nico, create a Thanksgiving dinner. After getting coached on how to prepare one by Martha Stewart, Wilhelmina comes through with creating the feast. However, when Nico arrives, she tells her mother that she had other plans, thus disappointing Wilhelmina, but hours later Nico changed her mind and finally bonded with her mother over dinner.

Back at MODE, Amanda and Marc, both bored with their holiday plans, decide to take advantage of the offices' closure for the holiday by staying in Wilhelmina's office to see the Macy's Thanksgiving Day Parade and frolic around in the couture by wearing dresses, singing along to Dreamgirls. But the party is about to take on a lot more surprises with Amanda and Marc spilling their confessions, including Amanda admitting to falling in love with Daniel (as did Marc but was quick to change the subject). Marc also told Amanda that Wilhelmina seems to be spending time talking to a person at weird times when he is not around her after he suspects his boss of being a lesbian, so after finding her phone bill and finding the number the two called it, which led them to the Wilmont Plastic Surgery Clinic and to the bandaged woman. After the woman picked up the phone Amanda pretended to be Wilhelmina and hung up, only to realize that the woman already knows they were calling from her office, so they ran out of the office. As expected, the woman calls Wilhelmina at home and tells her that her office was used to call her, leading to indications that has the two believing that someone else knows about their plans.

Over at the Suarez's, Betty, upset over Hilda giving the money to Leah, stood up and told her not to do it but Leah twisted it by saying that the woman that Betty talked to was drunk and wasn't stable. Convinced, Betty believed her and Hilda told Leah that she was invited to have Thanksgiving with them. However, reality set in as Hilda learned hours later that Leah had scammed them and Betty was right all along. The two then blamed themselves for their problems and decided to make up, knowing that after pointing fingers the sisters do need to support each other in this time of need.

The following day Betty got a phone call from a bar, who told her that Daniel was there, drunk. Betty then goes to the tavern and takes him home to her house in Queens.

== Production ==
In yet another telenovela scene from Vidas de Fuego, Marlene Favela appears as a nun from the fourth episode, who confronts the padre after learning that he is a murderer and wanted man.

A pair of Broadway musicals were referenced. Marc possibly made a tongue-in-cheek reference to Avenue Q when he speaks of telling his parents all about his girlfriend who lives in Canada. Another was a homage to Dreamgirls.

After Wilhelmina sits down to eat Thanksgiving dinner with Nico, in between shots some hairs move out of place in her side parting, then back into place, seemingly without her touching them, as she hasn't moved.

== Reception ==
There were some mixed feelings about this episode. As Entertainment Weekly's Michael Sleazek points out, "It's just that a couple of missed opportunities and a few slightly-off-the-mark plot twists surfaced like lumps in an otherwise delectable gravy."

== Ratings ==
The episode was watched by 12.95 million viewers in the United States and came in 23rd with a 4.6 for the week ending November 19, 2006

== Also starring ==
- Kevin Alejandro (Santos)
- Salma Hayek (Sofia Reyes)
- Judith Light (Claire Meade)
- Jowharah Jones (Nico Slater)
- Stelio Savante (Steve)

== Guest stars ==
- Martha Stewart (Herself)
- Sal Landi (Mr. Green)
- Teddy Sears (Hunter)
- Debi Mazar (Leah)
