= Fake Plastic Snow =

- Ugly Betty episode
- Henry talking about the snow in snowglobes.
- Episode no.: Season 1 Episode 10
- Directed by: Jim Hayman
- Written by: Veronica Becker; Sarah Kucserka
- Production code: 111
- Original air date: November 30, 2006

Guest appearance
- Salma Hayek

Episode chronology
← Previous "Lose the Boss"	Next → "Swag"
- Ugly Betty season 1

"Fake Plastic Snow" is an episode from the dramedy series Ugly Betty, written by Veronica Becker and Sarah Kucserka and directed by Jim Hayman. It is the eleventh episode overall in the series, but was presented as the tenth episode in the United States, Canada, and Australia. The title refers to the Radiohead song "Fake Plastic Trees" from their album The Bends.

== Plot ==
Betty is at her desk working on an expense report for Daniel when Henry comes by and asks if she's making her Christmas list. He spots mistletoe on her desk. She says it's just holly, but he kisses her anyway and tells her she's the girl he's been looking for. But it looks like this was all a fantasy as Betty wakes up in shock and glares at the photo of Walter by her bed before throwing the sheets over her face.

Back at Daniel's place, Sofia wakes up beside Daniel. Worried she will miss her flight, Sofia says they need a breather to see if what they have is real. Daniel insists he loves her, but Sofia says it's just hormones and sex; if this is real, she says, he should see other women while she's gone. If he doesn't get sweaty palms with them, maybe he does love her. He says that this is crazy but Sofia says this will convince her Daniel really feels this only for her.

Back at the Suarez's, Betty tells Hilda her dream, but Hilda says dreams don't mean anything and tells her sister to avoid Henry and everything will be fine. Meanwhile, Ignacio, who was arrested by Immigration a few days ago but was let go, comes down and Betty gives him his pills. He has a caseworker coming to work with him next month. Hilda gets in a fight with their neighbor Gina after she runs over her Christmas tree while it's sitting in the street.

Meanwhile, in Wilhelmina's office, Marc, who now knows the truth of his boss' intentions, is bringing Wilhelmina her breakfast and asking if Nico is coming home. He lithely snatches her whole wheat bagel causing her to almost bite his head off before he reminds her that they're 'sharing things' now that he knows her little secret.

Over at an office meeting in the conference room, Daniel announces that Betty has been offered a job and she will be accepting resumes for her position. The news brings a round of applause for Miss Suarez. Amanda and Marc wonder if they need to invite her to her own leaving party. Betty is surprised he's announced this, but he says that her going to work with Sofia is what's best for her. Amanda is already confident that she's the best one to take the job. Daniel then takes Betty into his office to tell her Sofia wants him to have an affair while she's away. He's through with being a bachelor and places half a dozen rings across his desk to try to pick out which will be perfect.

After leaving Daniel's office, Betty goes to her desk and opens a gift waiting for her, which turns out to be a notebook. She assumes this is from Daniel and gives him a thumbs-up, but he doesn't know what she's doing, since it didn't come from him. She walks down the hall to Amanda who tells her flatly that she is the right person to replace her and she'll prove it: she'll help Betty plan the Christmas party. Betty reluctantly accepts the offer. A bundle of fake snow arrives and Betty walks it into Henry, spilling it over both of them. He bashfully tries to pull some out of her hair as they shyly glance at each other. Henry then makes a series of unintentional double-entendres while Betty tries to hide her excitement when he says he will be 'on top of her' for the next few days overseeing the party budget.

Meanwhile, half a dozen lingerie models arrive to pose the new collection for Daniel. They include Aerin, Daniel's first supermodel girlfriend. Betty leaves to try to sort through resumes before she rushes in again to stop Daniel from easy temptation and announces that the photographer is ready for the models.

Across town later that day, Betty and Walter are at his store's Christmas party. They have their photo taken with Walter's boss and his wife. The wife of Walter's boss tells Betty that she used to work in Manhattan too, but they're "Queens girls" and this is where they belong. Betty stares at Walter and his boss with a less than enthusiastic feeling. Betty asks the woman when she knew that her husband was the one. She just knew; when did Betty know Walter was? She's not sure yet.

Upset that Marc wants in on her secret, Wilhelmina gets a call from her mysterious friend who's concerned about having Marc silenced. Wilhelmina states he will be permanently silenced very soon. She adjusts the Christmas tree ornaments and walks out revealing Marc hiding behind the tree. He's terrified and takes a breath of his inhaler.

In another part of the MODE building, it's late in the office and Amanda is still there, rummaging through Daniel's desk and trying on the rings he bought for Sofia. Her feelings for Daniel aren't exactly as simple as she wishes they were. One ring gets stuck on her finger.

Also later on in another location at the Meade Building, Bradford is being visited by Mr. Greene. He's managed to find proof that Fey Sommers is really dead after visiting the coroner at the cemetery, which leads to new questions over who the mystery woman really is, now that a relative has claimed Fey's remains.

The following morning, a worried Marc brings Wilhelmina her whole wheat. She asks him for his home address; she's sending a special delivery his way. He panics and takes another hit off his inhaler.

Amanda updates Betty on the elaborate party preparations she's done. Betty says she appreciates the help, but it doesn't erase her history with Daniel; she's not right for the job. Betty goes to her desk when Henry appears with ornaments. She tries to ignore him, but he tells her that he never saw snow until he moved to New York and she's so charmed that she can't stop staring at him. They begin to chat and she starts to fantasize about him before freezing up and telling him she has to get back to work.

Betty is pushing ornaments into Amanda's arms when she sees one of Daniel's rings on her finger. Betty chases her around the office before they try to remove the ring together. Betty spits on an appalled Amanda's finger and starts to pull while Amanda claims she doesn't feel anything for Daniel anymore. While pulling, Betty falls over and Amanda walks off.

Marc arrives at the party. At first, he's stuck in an elevator with a man who seems to be a hitman. He rushes past him and asks Amanda if she has a gun. Amanda says that no one would sell guns to anyone at the party. Marc rushes off to hide from the wrath of Wilhelmina and Amanda goes to stand by Betty to pester her about the job. Betty thinks Daniel needs someone who can look after him. Amanda says she'll run interference between Daniel and the models just to prove she can fill Betty's shoes. After glancing at Betty's clogs, she takes a swig and stomps off. Betty is left alone while Henry stands across the room flirting with her.

Christina is drunk on Santa's lap and slurs out a wish list of presents for her co-workers: "A heart for Wilhelmina, courage for Marc and brains for Amanda." Marc runs by while Betty moves around the room and under desks while trying to hide from Henry. She bangs her head and her painful yelp brings her to Henry's attention. He helps her up with a string of condoms in her hand but he was only there for a corkscrew. Christina walks by them dragging Santa into the bathroom as an appalled Marc runs out. Wilhelmina and the 'hitman' spot him and call him into her office. They take Marc to the parking garage and, just when he thinks they're going to kill him, they flip on a light to reveal a Hummer, delivered to him by the 'hitman', who happens to be an auto dealer. Marc is relieved to see they're just trying to buy his silence.

Daniel goes into his office followed by Aerin, who starts making out with him. Amanda promptly interrupts and reminds him that he's supposed to be engaged. Daniel agrees, telling Aerin he's in love with someone else. When Aerin thinks it's Amanda, she suggests a threesome (and possibly a ménage à trois), but Daniel explains that's not what he meant. Aerin then leaves.

Afterwards, Betty tells Daniel the only person she's seen who she could leave to look after him is Amanda. Betty said if Daniel was serious about her going, this was goodbye. Daniel gives Betty a silver business card holder and says he's proud of her; she's destined for bigger things. She hugs him and tries not to cry. Before she leaves, she asks him if the other gifts she's been receiving were from him. They weren't. Daniel calls Sofia to say he loves her and his heart doesn't race for anyone else. Betty walks out to her desk and looks at Henry. They exchange waves before Aerin walks by and kisses Henry, but he pushes her away. Betty is crushed at the sight and rushes away to the elevator while Henry runs after her. The ring falls off Amanda's finger.

Back in Queens, Hilda is going through Justin's gift list when they look out the window and see Gina obscenely defaming their Christmas lawn ornaments. By evening, Hilda returns with a decapitated glowing reindeer just before the lights go out. Hilda walks out to find Gina collapsed on the porch. They've been competing since they were teenagers and Gina always loses. After Gina admits her parents are away and she is spending Christmas alone, Hilda takes pity on her and invites her in for eggnog and brandy. It looks like they buried the hatchet for now.

Later on at MODE, Amanda is trying to clear up after the party. Daniel tells her Betty thinks she should be his new assistant, but can she do it? They promise to be professionals. Meanwhile, Ted the Texan walks in on Wilhelmina as she's about to leave and her heart starts to race.

Betty gets home and wonders if she's doing what's best with her life. She shows Hilda the photo of her with Walter. Hilda says she should appreciate Walter more. Within moments, Walter arrives with her last present (a Manhattan calendar); he was using Daniel to sneak her presents at work. Henry calls to ask if Betty wants to come over and watch "Rudolph the Red-Nosed Reindeer" on TV, but Hilda says Betty is busy, takes a message and promptly throws it away. Walter tells Betty that he's trying to understand her life in Manhattan, but she feels cold and it becomes clear to her that she doesn't love him.

== Allusions ==
When Betty asks Marc to suggest a replacement for her, now that she is going to MYW, Marc responds Anne Hathaway, a reference to the star's hit movie, The Devil Wears Prada, which the show was previously compared to. Christopher Gorham, who officially became a recurring regular starting with this episode, co-starred with Hathaway in the 2001 film The Other Side of Heaven.

== Production ==
Two names for this episode - "Fake Plastic Snow" and "Five Platinum Rings" were published on different web sites, but "Fake Plastic Snow" is the correct name. There were also conflicting errors on the details and at one point was supposed to be two episodes, but it also turned out to be false.

Marc's last name, St. James, is revealed for the first time in this episode. However it was not known at the time whether St. James was his actual last name, since his mother, who would show up in episode 17, had a different last name, Weiner. Marc would later admit to Betty that it was his real name in the aforementioned episode, but it was deleted.

Also, this episode had a deleted scene, but can be played on DVD version of Ugly Betty. This scene takes place right after the party was over, Amanda's ring has no drop, but Daniel admitted he bought six engagement rings to Sofia, but will choose one of them. Amanda tells Daniel about the ring having no drop, which disappoints Daniel.

== Reception ==
TV Guide's Matt Roush cited this installment as "adorable" and one of the best things to watch on Thursday nights

Gorham also sites "Fake Plastic Snow" as one of his favorite episodes on the show

== Ratings ==
"Fake Plastic Snow" was watched by 13.3 million viewers in the United States, its fourth highest in the series

== Awards ==
Becki Newton and Christopher Gorham submitted this episode for consideration of their work in the categories of "Outstanding Supporting Actress in a Comedy Series" and "Outstanding Guest Actor in a Comedy Series" respectively for the 2007 Emmy Awards.

== Also starring ==
- Christopher Gorham (Henry)
- Salma Hayek (Sofia Reyes)

== Guest stars ==
- Sal Landi (Mr. Green)
- Mini Anden (Aerin)
