= Anna Mercedes Morris =

American stuntwoman and actress (born 1978)

- Born: Anna Mercedes Morris; November 6, 1978 (age 47); Charlotte, North Carolina, U.S.
- Other name: Michelle Diamond
- Occupation: Stuntwoman/Actress
- Years active: 2001–present

Anna Mercedes Morris (born November 6, 1978) is an American professional Hollywood stuntwoman and actress. She also goes by the alias Michelle Diamond.

== Career ==
She has performed stunts on various shows and films including The Shield, Wizards of Waverly Place, CSI: NY, Cemetery Gates, and 2 Fast 2 Furious. She acts as a stunt double for various actors on shows including The Riches, Ugly Betty (for America Ferrera), and Without a Trace, and films such as Black Christmas, Dead & Deader (for Susan Ward), The Thirst: Blood War, Lonely Street and Bratz: The Movie.

Morris has also appeared on-screen; she had a small role on Cemetery Gates as a bicyclist. On-screen though, she is probably better known for competing (with the nickname of "Roadrunner") on a 1993 episode of Nickelodeon sports show, Nickelodeon GUTS, where she battled through a bad knee suffered in the Basic Training event to win the gold medal in the entire competition.
