= Jon Kinnally =

American television writer & producer

Jon Kinnally is an American television writer and producer.

== Career ==
Much of Kinnally's work has been with writing partner Tracy Poust. Kinnally and Poust have had a long association with Will & Grace. They started on the show as staff writers, eventually becoming executive Producers and showrunners in the show's eighth season. They penned the famous episode "A Chorus Lie" where Matt Damon (as Owen, Jack's heterosexual rival) pretended to be gay to vie for a spot in the Manhattan Gay Men's Chorus. They won a Writer's Guild Award for Outstanding Writing Episodic Comedy in 2018 for their episode "Rosario's Quinceañera."

Kinnally and Poust also wrote and produced on Ugly Betty which was nominated for and won Emmy, Golden Globes, NAACP Awards, and a Peabody, among others. They were nominated for a Writers Guild Award and an NAACP Image award for their episode "Crush'd." They were co-creators of the show Fun, a 2019 pilot that would have reunited Ugly Betty stars Michael Urie and Becki Newton. CBS did not pick up the show as a series.

Kinnally and Poust also wrote or produced episodes of 2 Broke Girls and AJ and the Queen as well as other television shows.

Kinnally also appeared as Mitchell in the Will & Grace episode "One Gay at a Time".

In August 2025, Kinnally released his memoir, I'm Prancing As Fast As I Can.

He is from Syracuse and is a graduate of the State University of New York at Oswego.
