= Cameron Litvack =

American TV producer and screenwriter

- Born: September 23, 1980 (age 45); Los Angeles, California, U.S.
- Occupations: Television producer, screenwriter
- Father: John Litvack

Cameron Litvack (born 23 September 1980) is an American television producer and screenwriter.

== Career ==
Litvack was born in Los Angeles, California. As a producer, he has worked on sixteen episodes of V (2009), sixteen episodes of Ugly Betty's first season and two episodes of Charmed's eighth season. As a writer, he has worked on ten episodes of Charmed, three episodes of V (2009), two episodes of Ugly Betty's first season and a single episode of Smallville's first season.

The demon character "Litvack" that appeared on the sixteenth episode of the second season of Charmed was named after his father, a WB executive at the time.

The character "Dr. Litvack," a neurosurgeon that appeared in the "Lexmas" episode of Smallville, was named after his brother Zachary Litvack, an actual neurosurgeon.

== Personal life ==
He is the son of television executive and producer John Litvack, known as the "dean of current programming".
