= Dailyn Rodriguez =

American television writer, producer, and showrunner

- Occupations: Television writer, producer, showrunner
- Known for: Queen of the South, The Lincoln Lawyer

Dailyn Rodriguez is an American television writer, producer, and showrunner. She is known for her work as a co-executive producer and writer on the USA Network series Queen of the South, where she later served as showrunner, and as a co-showrunner of the Netflix series The Lincoln Lawyer.

== Career ==
Rodriguez began her television writing career as a staff writer on the ABC series Ugly Betty. She later wrote for series including The Glades on A&E and Reckless on CBS.

Her most prominent role has been on the drama series Queen of the South, an adaptation of the telenovela La Reina del Sur. Rodriguez joined the series as a co-executive producer and writer for its first season. She was promoted to executive producer and served as the series' showrunner for its final seasons until the show concluded in 2021.

Following Queen of the South, Rodriguez joined the Netflix drama The Lincoln Lawyer as a co-showrunner for its second season. In early 2026, Netflix renewed the series for the fifth season. She has been awarded the Recipient of the Norman Lear Writer's Award at Imagen Awards.

== Filmography ==
- Ugly Betty (writer, 2006–2007)
- The Glades (writer, 2011)
- Reckless (writer, 2014)
- Queen of the South (writer, co-executive producer, executive producer, showrunner; 2016–2021)
- The Lincoln Lawyer (co-showrunner, 2024)
