= Tricia Brock (director) =

American screenwriter and director

- Occupations: Television director, television writer
- Years active: 1979–present

Tricia Brock is an American television director and writer.

== Career ==
Brock began her career working in television commercials. She was then recruited to write two episodes of the television series Twin Peaks. She continued to write for other television series, namely Knots Landing, Family Law and the television film Due East, directed by Helen Shaver.

In 2002, Brock shifted her focus to directing, making her directorial debut with the short film The Car Kid starring James Franco and Brad Renfro. A portion of the film was later re-edited into the full-length feature Killer Diller, which was screened at the South by Southwest Film Festival and the Tribeca Film Festival in 2004.

In 2005, she began directing for television, directing episodes of Grey's Anatomy, Veronica Mars, Ugly Betty, The L Word, Gossip Girl, Breaking Bad, 30 Rock, Hellcats, White Collar, Smash, The Walking Dead, Mr. Robot, On Becoming a God in Central Florida, Almost Family, Love Life, NOS4A2, Girls, Person of Interest, Silicon Valley and other series.

In 2020, Brock directed Dummy, which earned Anna Kendrick a Primetime Emmy nomination for Outstanding Actress in a Short Form Comedy or Drama Series. In 2022, Brock directed two episodes of Bridgerton season 2.
