= Will & Grace season 6 =

Will & Grace
- Season 6
- American DVD cover
- No. of episodes: 24

Release
- Original network: NBC
- Original release: September 25, 2003 – April 29, 2004

Season chronology
- ← Previous; Season 5 Next → Season 7

The sixth season of Will & Grace premiered on September 25, 2003, and concluded on April 29, 2004. It consisted of 24 episodes.

== Cast and characters ==
Due to Debra Messing's pregnancy - which is visible in multiple episodes late in the season - Grace did not appear in five episodes; "Heart Like a Wheelchair" (episode 6), "I Never Cheered for My Father" (episode 21), "Speechless" (episode 22) and "I Do. Oh, No, You Didn't" (episode 23/24).

=== Main cast ===
- Eric McCormack as Will Truman
- Debra Messing as Grace Adler
- Megan Mullally as Karen Walker
- Sean Hayes as Jack McFarland
- Shelley Morrison as Rosario Salazar

=== Recurring cast ===
- Harry Connick Jr. as Dr. Marvin "Leo" Markus
- Leslie Jordan as Beverley Leslie
- John Cleese as Lyle Finster
- Minnie Driver as Lorraine Finster
- Dave Foley as Stuart Lamarack
- Tim Bagley as Larry
- Jerry Levine as Joe
- Bobby Cannavale as Vince D'Angelo
- Michael Angarano as Elliott

=== Guest stars ===
- Emily Rutherfurd as Joanne
- Stephanie Faracy as Eva
- Laura Kightlinger as Nurse Sheila
- Lea DeLaria as Nurse Carver
- Kali Rocha as Stephanie
- Chris Penn as Rudy
- Keone Young as Owner
- Brandon Routh as Sebastian
- Kathryn Joosten as Felicia
- Kenneth Tigar as John
- Amy Farrington as Phyllis
- Sara Paxton as Melanie

=== Special guest stars ===
- Blythe Danner as Marilyn Truman
- Mira Sorvino as Diane
- James Earl Jones as himself
- Gordon Davidson as himself
- Jack Black as Dr. Isaac Hershberg
- Dylan McDermott as Tom
- Candice Bergen as herself
- Tom Everett Scott as Alex
- Debbie Reynolds as Bobbi Adler
- Barry Manilow as himself
- Sara Gilbert as Cheryl
- Geena Davis as Janet Adler
- Hal Linden as Alan
- Tracey Ullman as Ann
- Suzanne Pleshette as Lois Whitley
- Eileen Brennan as Zandra
- Edie Falco as Deirdre
- Chloë Sevigny as Monet
- John Edward as himself
- Bebe Neuwirth as herself
- Sharon Osbourne as Nonny
- Lesley Ann Warren as Tina
- Jennifer Lopez as herself
- Tim Curry as Marion Finster

== Episodes ==
No. overall	No. in season	Title	Directed by	Written by	Original release date	Prod. code	U.S. viewers (millions)
123	1	"Dames at Sea"	James Burrows	Adam Barr	September 25, 2003	6001	20.29
Karen and Rosario get back to the yacht on a stolen Jet Ski, and Karen tries to weasel out of her promise to let Rosario take one Friday off of work a month because Rosario saved her life. Grace freaks out about the romantic letter to her husband from another doctor, but when Leo has to come back to the U.S. (because he left his passport in the bag that Grace had), he assures her she's the only woman he's interested in. Leo decides to give up Doctors Without Borders so he can be with Grace. Jack and Will wake up naked in bed together and aren't sure what happened. Each decides the other must be romantically interested, and each tries to let the other down easily. Luckily, Karen has video surveillance in every room on the boat, and she confirms that nothing happened between the drunk and naked duo. Note: Originally aired as a 41-minute episode.
124	2	"Last Ex to Brooklyn"	James Burrows	Alex Herschlag	October 2, 2003	6002	16.80
Leo invites his pretty ex-girlfriend, Diane (guest star Mira Sorvino), to dinner at his and Grace's apartment, and Grace rounds out the guest list with Will, Karen and Jack for the dinner party. Grace has all jealousy firmly under control, and even gets along with Diane, until she finds out that Diane also happens to be the only woman Will has ever slept with. The night degenerates from there when Grace has a jealous fit about Will, Leo wonders why Grace isn't jealous about his relationship with Diane, and Diane admits that not only was Will better in bed than Leo, but Will gave her the only orgasm she's ever had and she still carries a torch for him. Some peace is made when Will explains to Grace that Diane meant nothing to him, and that's exactly why he was able to sleep with her and not with Grace, his best friend. Jack and a lecherous Karen comfort a weepy Diane and give her Lorraine's small dog that they found in Karen's closet.
125	3	"Home Court Disadvantage"	James Burrows	Jhoni Marchinko	October 9, 2003	6003	14.56
When Grace and Leo go to play tennis at a posh country club with Karen, Grace finds out that Karen actually doesn't like Leo. Grace is bothered by this, but Leo convinces her that it doesn't matter, because he doesn't really like Karen and her opinion doesn't matter to him. Just as Grace is becoming used to not caring what Karen thinks, Leo does an about-face and starts trying to prove to Karen how likeable he is. Grace tells Karen that if she doesn't like Leo, then they probably won't be spending as much time together anymore, and Karen is so concerned about losing Grace as a friend that she promises she will always pretend to like Leo—just like she does Will. Will and Jack go to visit Will's mother, Marilyn, after her divorce and find her moping around in the dark drinking wine and not bathing. They take her to see Mamma Mia on Broadway and cheer her up, but then she dreads going back home. Jack has the great idea of having Marilyn move in with Will for a while, and even though Will thinks it's a terrible idea, he can't say no when he sees how much his mom perks up at the idea.
126	4	"Me and Mr. Jones"	James Burrows	Gary Janetti	October 23, 2003	6004	13.51
Jack gets a one-line part in an off-Broadway play starring James Earl Jones, but when the director likes Jack's delivery better than James's, James Earl Jones finds himself studying in Jack's acting class. Grace trails after a woman and her trainer at the gym so that she can make use of the trainer without having to pay for it. Will and his mother are both sick of living together, but neither wants to say it to the other. Finally, they admit their feelings, and Marilyn decides to move back home that night, but in the process of moving she twists her ankle and Will finds himself having to care for his wheelchair-using mother for a few more weeks.
127	5	"A-Story, Bee-Story"	James Burrows	Gail Lerner	October 30, 2003	6007	15.89
Leo gets an offer to set up a clinic in Cambodia, and he is itching to go, but realizes that if he left he would make Grace miserable. While Grace is sick in bed, Will takes Leo out on the town to remind him of how great New York is, but Will's New York is not Leo's New York, and Leo is relieved when he finally talks Will into going to a Rangers hockey game. Leo still wants to go to Cambodia, and it's Will who ends up distressed when Leo reports that he is going to Cambodia... and Grace is going with him. Karen coaches Jack to prepare for a gay spelling bee, but when Jack is one of the final two contestants, he gets angry with Karen when she tries to help him cheat. Luckily, Jack wins on his own anyway. Note: The storyline of Grace being bed-ridden with food poisoning in this episode is a result of Debra Messing being confined to bed rest because of severe morning sickness. Consequently, the two small scenes in which she appears were actually filmed in her house. Note: Originally aired as a 40-minute episode.
128	6	"Heart Like a Wheelchair"	James Burrows	Tracy Poust & Jon Kinnally	November 6, 2003	6005	14.68
Will is frustrated by still having to take care of his mother, but when he meets a cute guy (Dylan McDermott) in the park who is also wheeling his infirm mother around, he forces Marilyn to stay even when she's able to get around on her own. Will finally goes out on a date with the cute stranger from the park, but it turns out that he's a big freak that can't be away from his mother for even an evening. Karen hunts down an L. Finster at a local hotel, and goes there to confront her rival, Lorraine. Instead, Karen meets Lorraine's dapper father, Lyle (John Cleese), who immediately takes a liking to Karen and convinces her to make out with him even though she claims to hate him. Absent: Debra Messing as Grace
129	7	"Nice in White Satin"	James Burrows	Bill Wrubel	November 13, 2003	6006	15.21
Karen has to get a physical, but she ends up with an extremely unorthodox doctor (Jack Black). Grace calls from yet another fast-food restaurant in Cambodia. Jack meets a cute male nurse and enrolls in nursing school. After he demands that Karen and Will support his dream and pay his tuition, he drops out, deciding to be a surfer instead. Will and Karen go to the nursing school to get the tuition back, and find out that nursing was something that Jack was actually good at. Jack's friends convince him to seriously give nursing a try.
130	8	"Swimming from Cambodia"	James Burrows	Sonja Warfield	November 20, 2003	6008	16.38
Grace comes back from Cambodia, ostensibly for her mother's 50th birthday party, but she later admits to Will that she's back for good. Her being in Cambodia with Leo wasn't working out, and there's something wrong with their marriage. She's going to stay in New York and wait for him to be done with his assignment in Cambodia. Will offers to let her move in with him again, and she happily accepts. Jack has a new tough teacher in nursing school, and when she makes Jack sad, Karen threatens her, guaranteeing Jack an A. However, when Jack starts coasting and skipping classes, he soon realizes that he actually misses his classes and studying.
131	9	"Strangers with Candice"	James Burrows	Sally Bradford	December 4, 2003	6009	14.23
Everyone goes out to a restaurant, but when they can't get their table for 5, because Will's date hasn't shown up, Grace grabs a stranger from the bar so that their "entire party" is there and they can get seated. Will meets a woman (Kali Rocha) at the bar who thinks he's cute, so he flirts with her to make himself feel better after getting stood-up. Meanwhile, it turns out that the stranger Grace grabbed is actually a guy she randomly made out with in a bar in her early '20s, and she flirts with him in order to make herself feel better about her crumbling marriage. Will is horrified by what Grace is doing, and tells her companion that she's married. Grace is equally horrified by what Will is doing, and tells his companion that he's gay. Grace and Will's dates leave together. Karen runs into her old friend/arch-nemesis, Candice Bergen, and they continue their trend of playing practical jokes on each other. At one point, they team up, and play a practical joke on Jack, making him think that Candice needs the Heimlich maneuver which he recently learned in nursing school. Guest star – Candice Bergen.
132	10	"Fanilow"	James Burrows	Kari Lizer	December 11, 2003	6010	12.82
Will is excited to be first in line for Barry Manilow tickets, and asks Grace to hold his place while he runs across the street to use the bathroom. Grace is shocked to see her mother, who cancelled their annual Hanukkah shopping trip, having dinner at a nearby restaurant with Jack. Grace calls Karen and gets her to hold Will's place in line while she confronts her mother. Meanwhile, Will snubs a guy who is hitting on him only to later find out that he is Barry Manilow's tour manager, and can get him backstage to meet the man himself. Will does some serious ass-kissing, and promises to go on a date with the guy in Philadelphia, in order to meet his idol. Grace realizes that she actually does want to spend time with her mother, and is jealous that her mother is choosing to spend time with Jack instead. Karen realizes she likes Barry Manilow's music.
133	11	"The Accidental Tsuris"	James Burrows	Jeff Greenstein	January 15, 2004	6011	14.95
Grace's screw-up sister Janet (Geena Davis) comes to town, and when she decides to crash at Will and Grace's apartment and sponge off them while she gets her celebrity jewelry line going, Grace finally yells at her and tells her to get a real job and her own apartment. Grace is amazed when, just a few weeks later, Janet has a studio apartment, a job at Ann Taylor, a new look, and cooks a fabulous dinner for Grace and her friends. Unlike Will and Jack, Grace can't seem to be happy for her sister, and finally she admits that she likes having screw-up sisters, because then she gets to be the normal one. Janet tells Grace that this was all Will's doing, and Will admits that he thought Grace wanted a normal sister, so he tried to make Janet normal. Grace is touched that Will would go through so much trouble for her, and is relieved to hear that Janet got fired from her job at Ann Taylor because she was drunk on the job. Meanwhile, Lyle Finster hunts down Karen, and tells her he wants her, but she blows him off. However, when Lorraine shows up and tells Karen to keep her dirty paws off her father, Karen runs straight to Lyle's bed and arranges for Lorraine to find them in a compromising position. Lyle tells Karen that he's in love with her, so Karen admits that she slept with him just to annoy Lorraine. Karen tells Lyle that she has fallen for him as well, but Lyle feels used and kicks Karen out of his hotel room.
134	12	"A Gay/December Romance"	James Burrows	Tracy Poust & Jon Kinnally	January 22, 2004	6012	15.71
Will goes to an art opening and meets a handsome older man, Alan, who is a rich plastic surgeon. He is surprised when Alan buys him one of the paintings at the opening, and then as they begin to spend more time together, Alan buys him more and more extravagant gifts, including a horse and a Western outfit to go with it. Grace points out to Will that he has a sugar daddy, while Jack bemoans his lack of a sugar daddy. Will confronts Alan, who plays hurt and makes Will feel bad for assuming the worst, but Will later finds Alan with a brand new boy toy at another art opening. Grace discovers a great Asian noodle place near her office, but when she drops her take-out and they won't replace it for free, she decides to boycott the place and get all her friends to boycott it too. Luckily, Jack and Karen ignore her, and she finally realizes that the noodles are just too good to stay away.
135	13	"Ice Cream Balls"	James Burrows	Laura Kightlinger	February 10, 2004	6013	10.84
Will has a new client, Stuart, that meets Jack and wants to be set up with him, so Will bribes Jack into going out with him. When Stuart starts including Jack in the negotiations to sell his company, and follows Jack's ridiculous advice, Will blurts out that he bribed Jack. Both Jack and Stuart end up hurt, so Will figures out a way to get them back together. Grace takes Karen up to Vermont with her to tend to Leo's cabin where the pipes have frozen. When they get into bed, they find thousands of dollars stashed beneath the mattress. Grace, horrified that Leo has been hiding all this money from her, decides to go out and spend it on frivolous things. Grace is later horrified when she realizes that she was in the wrong cabin, and she just spent an elderly couple's life savings.
136	14	"Looking for Mr. Good Enough"	James Burrows	Gary Janetti	February 19, 2004	6014	18.91
Will takes a cooking class, and gets depressed when he's the only single person in it. Luckily, a really hot guy named Adam shows up and not only pairs up with Will for cooking, but is also immediately attracted to Will and wants to take him home. Will is excited until he is led to believe that Jack might have hired Adam who is actually a prostitute. Will tells off Adam who leaves, hurt, and then Will finds out that Jack didn't hire him. Will chases after Adam, but it turns out that it was actually the cooking teacher, Ann, who hired Adam for Will, thinking Will was pathetic and alone. Karen's mother Lois moves to New York to be closer to Karen and asks to Grace to decorate her apartment. Grace does so, on a tight budget, because Lois doesn't want to take any money from Karen. Grace and Karen work hard to make the apartment beautiful with as little money as possible, and they do so. Lois is pleased that she has a place in which her daughter can come visit her, but when she gets an offer to sell the apartment for $100,000 more than she paid for it, she takes the money and runs to Japan. Will and Grace realize that that wouldn't be a bad business plan....
137	15	"Flip-Flop"	James Burrows	Adam Barr	February 26, 2004	6015	18.14
138	16	"Flip-Flop"	James Burrows	Alex Herschlag	March 4, 2004	6016	15.32
Part I: While seeing patients as a student nurse, Jack runs into his old acting teacher Zandra who is preparing to move into the Actors' Retirement Home. Will and Grace, who want to be the apartment flippers who care, begin by buying Zandra's apartment and re-doing it. When Zandra sees it, she decides she wants it back, and Jack tries to guilt Will and Grace into giving it back. However, when Stuart sees the apartment, he proposes that he buy it and he and Jack move into it, and suddenly Jack forgets all about Zandra. Lyle Finster finally forgives Karen for using him, and he moves into her luxurious apartment. When Lorraine shows up penniless at their doorstep, Lyle convinces Karen to let Lorraine move in with them. Karen is quickly disgusted by the way Lyle always coddles Lorraine and always gives into her. Part II: Jack and Stuart prepare to settle into their new apartment, but quickly realize that they're moving too fast and aren't ready to feel so settled—and old. Will and Grace encourage their indecision, having just received a huge offer on the apartment. The flippers who care feel they've learned a lesson in caring when Jack and Stuart decide not to take the apartment, and the huge offer is withdrawn at the same time. They decide to sell the place back to Zandra, but when the huge offer is re-issued, Will doesn't hesitate to boot Zandra again. Lyle finally disciplines Lorraine a little, and she yells at him and moves out. Lyle blames Karen for driving a wedge between him and his daughter, and leaves her. Lorraine comes and finds Karen and tells her how miserable Lyle is. Lorraine and Karen make their peace, and Lyle and Karen happily reunite. Everyone decides to move back into Karen's apartment together, and Lyle proposes marriage to Karen, which she happily accepts.
139	17	"East Side Story"	James Burrows	Gail Lerner	March 11, 2004	6017	15.61
With their new apartment-flipping business, Will and Grace find themselves going head to head with the infamous flipping dykes of the East Side, Deirdre and Monet. To defeat them, they decide to divide and conquer, and Will goes after the weak one, Monet, who is clearly attracted to him. Their plan fails, however, when Deirdre makes a move on Grace. Karen worries about not having Stan's blessing for her new marriage to Lyle, but can't get John Edward to put her in touch with Stan's spirit. Jack tries to impersonate Stan's spirit and tell Karen that she has his blessing, but Karen doesn't fall for it. Luckily, Karen does fall for it when Rosario does it.
140	18	"Courting Disaster"	James Burrows	Sally Bradford	March 18, 2004	6018	15.00
Jack and Grace go to the movies, and Jack is horrified to see Stuart there with a hot young guy. Jack makes a scene in the theater and stomps out, but later finds out that Stuart was seeing a movie with his son. Stuart apologizes to Jack for not telling him about his son, and Jack apologizes for not telling Stuart about his son either. Will attempts to teach Karen how to drive, but they quickly get pulled over and given a ticket. When Will sees that the cop forgot to sign the ticket, he decides to fight it in court. In court, Will and cop who wrote the ticket realize that they have mutual friends who have been trying to set them up for years, so instead of fighting over the ticket they decide to go out on a date Friday night.
141	19	"No Sex 'n' the City"	James Burrows	Steve Gabriel	March 25, 2004	6019	15.94
Grace advises Will to not be so needy in his burgeoning relationship with Vince, and instead play it cool. Will takes her advice, but plays it so cool that he turns off Vince, who isn't into stupid relationship games. Luckily, Will realizes that he screwed up and apologizes to Vince, and Vince is very forgiving. Karen is horrified when she finds out both Friends and Frasier are having their series finales this year. She and Jack lament the loss of their favorite shows, and wonder what they're going to talk about now that they're over. Both of them freak out when they run into Bebe Neuwirth, who they both call Lilith, in their favorite coffee shop.
142	20	"Fred Astaire and Ginger Chicken"	James Burrows	Ain Gordon	April 1, 2004	6020	13.48
Will finally introduces Vince to Grace by having them both over for dinner, but when Grace leaves in a rush before dinner has even been served, Will can't stop stressing that she doesn't like his new boyfriend. When Will drags Vince over to Grace's apartment to ask her what's wrong, she admits that she actually likes Vince very much, she was just saddened seeing the two of them so happy together when her relationship with Leo is such a mess. Karen tells Jack that they won't be able to spend much time together after she gets married and that he should be ready to move on. However, when Karen sees Jack auditioning replacement straight female friends, she gets jealous and promises him that she'll find time for him.
143	21	"I Never Cheered for My Father"	James Burrows	Adam Barr	April 8, 2004	6021	13.29
Will's dad's mistress, Tina, comes to Will concerned that his dad, George, is seeing someone else. Will investigates, and finds out that his father and mother have started sleeping together again. Will tells Tina that his dad is seeing someone else, and she should move on. Will's mother comes over and tells him that sex with his father isn't as much fun now that they're not sneaking around. At the same time, Tina comes over because she found out that it was Will's mom that George was sleeping with. Will tells Tina to get over it, and tells his mom to just be with his dad and be happy about it, but after they leave Will's apartment, the two women agree to share George instead. Elliot tries out for the cheerleading squad at school just to get some of Jack's attention. Absent: Debra Messing as Grace
144	22	"Speechless"	James Burrows	Sally Bradford	April 22, 2004	6022	16.36
Jack's nursing school graduation is a day earlier that he expected, and he hasn't yet prepared his speech that he gets to give because he was voted most popular student. Will, who is depressed that a play he wrote in college isn't as good as he thought it would be, takes on the task of ghostwriting the speech for Jack. Will writes a beautiful and moving speech about following your dreams, and as Jack starts to read it at graduation, he realizes that nursing isn't his dream and he still wants to be an actor. Absent: Debra Messing as Grace
145	23	"I Do, Oh, No, You Di-in't"	James Burrows	Jeff Greenstein & Jhoni Marchinko	April 29, 2004	6023	20.53
146	24	"I Do, Oh, No, You Di-in't"	James Burrows	Kari Lizer & Sonja Warfield	April 29, 2004	6024	20.53
Lyle comes up with the idea of skipping the picturesque fall wedding, and instead getting married in Vegas. Karen warms up the private jet and takes Will and Jack to Las Vegas, Nevada with her for her wedding. Karen finds herself compromising more and more to Lyle's wishes, but Jack assures her that marriage needs compromise. Karen meets Lyle's strangely affectionate brother, Marion. Leo shows up from Cambodia, and breaks the news that Grace hurt her back in New York and won't be able to make it. Will is confused as to why Leo doesn't seem that broken up about Grace not being there, and doesn't jump at the chance to borrow Karen's jet and go see his wife. Leo finally admits to Will that he kissed someone else while he was in Cambodia. Karen bumps into Jennifer Lopez in the hotel bathroom and gets her sing at the wedding because Jennifer used to be friends with Rosario. Karen and Lyle get married, but Karen is furious because the one thing she insisted on, the music when she walked down the aisle, Lyle changed without consulting her. Karen swallows her rage as Lyle eloquently apologizes for not honoring her wishes about the music. Will encourages Leo to talk to Grace and tell her the truth about kissing another woman. Rosario leads the wedding guests in the chicken dance. Jennifer Lopez shows up to perform, but one of her backup dancers twists his ankle so Jack fills in. Lyle gives an eloquent speech about how much Karen has given up for him, and says he's lucky to have found a woman who is "happy to mortgage her entire personal identity" just for him. Karen realizes she's not happy that way, and decides she wants a divorce. Leo, after talking to Grace on the phone, tells Will that Grace never wants to see him again. Will is confused why Grace would overreact so badly to one kiss, but then Leo admits he actually slept with the other woman. Will tells Leo that he's on his own. Jack is ecstatic when he gets an offer to go on tour with Jennifer Lopez. Absent: Debra Messing as Grace
