= Will & Grace season 2 =

Will & Grace
- Season 2
- American DVD cover
- No. of episodes: 24

Release
- Original network: NBC
- Original release: September 21, 1999 – May 23, 2000

Season chronology
- ← Previous; Season 1 Next → Season 3

The second season of Will & Grace premiered on September 21, 1999, and concluded on May 23, 2000. It consists of 24 episodes.

== Cast and characters ==
=== Main cast ===
- Eric McCormack as Will Truman
- Debra Messing as Grace Adler
- Megan Mullally as Karen Walker
- Sean Hayes as Jack McFarland

=== Recurring cast ===
- Shelley Morrison as Rosario Salazar
- Tom Gallop as Rob
- Leigh-Allyn Baker as Ellen
- Marshall Manesh as Mr. Zamir
- Gregory Hines as Ben Doucette
- Jo Marie Payton as Mrs. Freeman

=== Special guest stars ===
- Debbie Reynolds as Bobbi Adler
- Veronica Cartwright as Judith McFarland
- Stone Phillips as himself
- Sydney Pollack as George Truman
- Al Roker as himself
- Molly Shannon as Val Bassett
- Neil Patrick Harris as Bill
- Orson Bean as Professor Joseph Dudley
- Piper Laurie as Sharon
- Joan Collins as Helena Barnes

=== Guest stars ===
- Shirley Prestia as Mrs. Pressman
- Lou Cutell as Mr. Arthur Pressman
- Scott Patterson as Donald Dorio
- Peter Paige as Roger O'Neil
- Gary Grubbs as Harlin Polk
- Steve Valentine as Kai
- Tamlyn Tomita as Naomi
- Penn Badgley as Todd
- Megyn Price as Claire
- Laura Kightlinger as Nurse Sheila
- Markus Flanagan as Dr. Loranger
- Corey Parker as Josh
- Mary Pat Gleason as Sally
- Chris Potter as Michael
- Dan Bucatinsky as Neil
- Jennifer Elise Cox as Nurse Pittman
- Reggie Hayes as Dr. Osher
- Debra Mooney as Sister Robert
- Daryl Sabara as Broccoli Boy

== Episodes ==
Note: the episodes on the Season 2 DVD are not in the same order as the broadcast dates shown below.

No. overall	No. in season	Title	Directed by	Written by	Original release date	Prod. code	Viewers (millions)	Rating/share (18–49)
23	1	"Guess Who's Not Coming to Dinner"	James Burrows	David Kohan & Max Mutchnick	September 21, 1999	63401	16.09	8.72/22
Grace moves into an apartment across the hall and decides to throw a party without Will's help to show her new-found independence. Will stresses about a date with a man from a bookstore. Jack has to move in with Rosario in Karen's apartment to make things look good for the INS.
24	2	"Election"	James Burrows	Adam Barr	September 28, 1999	63402	12.99	6.1/16
When Grace finds out that Will, acting as tenant board president, is the only tenant with a working fireplace, she decides to run against him in the upcoming election and take him down a notch or two in arrogance. They run an ugly race, slandering each other and buying vote, and in the end Grace wins when the two of them pester the last tenant for his vote while he's in his hospital room. But Grace isn't sure she wants the position when Will actually seems psyched to not have the job anymore, and she starts being pestered by all the tenants. Karen lets Guapo, the parrot out the window by mistake, and goes on a buying spree for Jack to make it up to him. When Guapo comes back, Jack hides the bird in the closet so that he can keep getting expensive gifts from Karen. Karen finally gives him the keys to an expensive boat, and he finally feels so guilty that he tells her what he did, and then she tells him that she actually knew all the time because she had video cameras everywhere. And the keys are only to Grace's office anyway.
25	3	"Das Boob"	James Burrows	Jhoni Marchinko	November 2, 1999	63406	12.94	6.4/16
Grace is written up in the newspaper with an accompanying picture that makes her look much bustier than she actually is. When an old high school crush calls her and asks her out, she is incredibly excited until Karen points out that she'll now have to live up her published dimensions. With Karen's help she buys a water-filled bra that makes her look much larger up front than she is, but she springs some leaks while on her date at the art gallery and has to admit to her crush that she's wearing a water-bra. He calls her too shallow for his taste and quickly ditches her. Jack finds out that Will hooked up with his ex-boyfriend Walter and dumps Will as a friend because Walter was the love of his life. Will feels terrible, and tries to arrange a reconciliation between Jack and Walter, but when he does so it turns out that Jack was thinking about someone else and he isn't interested in Walter at all.
26	4	"Whose Mom is it Anyway?"	James Burrows	Alex Herschlag	November 9, 1999	63405	11.82	6.0/15
Grace's mom comes to town and Grace is scared that her mom will try to set her up again. It turns out, however, that her mom is more interested in setting up Will with someone. Grace looks at this as an opportunity to show her mother how bad she is at setting people up, but is horrified when Will actually gets along with the guy. Grace finally admits that even though she's been telling her mom to stop setting her up for years now, she feels bad that her mother has actually stopped. Jack and Rosario are being interviewed by the INS to make sure their greencard marriage is for real, but it turns out their interviewer is somebody that Jack has met and hooked up with before. Luckily, Jack makes a big show of his love for Rosario, and the INS officers passes them just for trying so hard.
27	5	"Polk Defeats Truman"	James Burrows	Jeff Greenstein	November 16, 1999	63404	12.41	6.2/15
Will's ego inflates after closing a major deal for Harlin, and he decides to focus solely on the millionaire's business by dumping all of the smaller clients who supported him when he first became a lawyer. But Will gets a harsh lesson when Harlin decides to fire him, leaving the lawyer without any prospects. Stan puts Karen on a budget to stop her wild spending, and she becomes terrified when Grace takes her to an outlet mall to teach her how to shop smarter.
28	6	"To Serve and Disinfect"	James Burrows	Katie Palmer	November 23, 1999	63407	11.83	6.2/16
Jack challenges Will to become a cater-waiter on his staff, but when Will finds out that the catered event is for the American Bar Association, he backs out and joins the dinner guests. However, when one of Will's acquaintances starts treating Jack horribly, Will stands up for his friend and rejoins the wait staff. Grace finds out that Karen once starred in a fetish video, causing Karen to be so embarrassed that she quits her job as Grace's assistant. Grace placates Karen by finding and buying all the copies of the video and giving them to Karen... but of course she keeps one for herself.
29	7	"Homo for the Holidays"	James Burrows	Alex Herschlag	November 25, 1999	63408	19.15	8.8/22
Will invites Jack's mother to Thanksgiving dinner as a surprise, only to discover that Mrs. McFarland doesn't know her son is gay; instead, Jack has claimed that he and Grace used to date. Will and Grace encourage Jack to tell the truth, while Karen is more upset by the fact that he chose Grace to be his imaginary girlfriend instead of her. When Jack finally works up the courage to confess, his mother reveals a secret of her own. In 2009, TV Guide ranked this episode #74 on its list of the 100 Greatest Episodes.
30	8	"Terms of Employment"	James Burrows	David Kohan & Max Mutchnick	November 30, 1999	63409	11.61	5.8/15
Grace looks to Will for representation when a famous lawyer, Ben Doucette, doesn't pay her for a consulting assignment. Will ends up getting a job offer, and when he accepts it, his first job is to make Grace's claim go away. Under protest, he takes on the assignment, but when Grace is about to get screwed, he backs down and can't go through with it. Ben tells Will that it was actually all a test of Will's character, and ends up giving Grace the money she's owed and letting Will keep his new job. Jack gets a part in a sexual harassment education video, but when his co-star falls ill, Karen takes her place. Karen discovers during filming that Jack's tongue can do miraculous things in her ear, and it takes them 147 takes to get the video right. After they're done filming, Karen shows Jack what she can do with HER tongue in HIS ear, and they trade ear favors back and forth.
31	9	"I Never Promised You An Olive Garden"	James Burrows	Jon Kinnally & Tracy Poust	December 14, 1999	63403	12.02	6.1/16
Will and Grace tire of their boring friends Rob and Ellen, and instead bond with Kai and Naomi, a hip young couple who introduce the pair to New York's nightlife. When Rob and Ellen find out that Will and Grace have been lying to them, they leave in a huff – and leave the latter two in an uncomfortable position when Kai and Naomi's wild partying proves too much for them. Karen drags Jack along when she attends a parent-teacher conference at her children's school, and a chance encounter with a sensitive young boy named John helps Jack face his traumatic experiences as a victim of bullying.
32	10	"Tea and a Total Lack of Sympathy"	James Burrows	Jon Kinnally & Tracy Poust	January 11, 2000	63410	13.44	6.9/17
Will has until Friday to find a new client or lose his job, so he finds himself kissing Karen's ass to get her husband's business. Jack and Grace use a crappy teapot to get on their favorite TV show, Antiques on the Road (Antiques Roadshow). When they find out, to their surprise, that the teapot is worth $30,000, they fight over it, breaking someone else's valuable antique and having to give up the teapot in payment.
33	11	"Seeds of Discontent"	James Burrows	Jhoni Marchinko	January 25, 2000	63414	12.56	6.9/16
Grace is upset when Will's best friend from high school comes to visit from Paris and asks Will to be the father of her baby. Grace realizes that it's partly because she's worried about Will having a child growing up so far away, but even more than that, she sort of always thought of Will as her backup sperm in case she never met a man she wanted to marry and have kids with. Will calls her selfish when she tells him this, but then he realizes that he always thought of Grace as his backup eggs, and if he ever has a kid he wants it to be with her.
34	12	"He's Come Undone"	James Burrows	Adam Barr	February 8, 2000	63411	13.70	7.3/18
Will is terrified when he starts having erotic dreams about Grace, and starts seeing a therapist to solve the problem. The doctor's apparently innocent suggestion to bring Grace in for a session becomes tense when he starts dating her, which leads to frustration for Will – and a solution to the causes of his nightmares. Jack wants Karen to treat Rosario better, but is surprised to discover that both are happier when they're arguing and fighting with one another.
35	13	"Oh Dad, Poor Dad, He's Kept Me in the Closet and I'm So Sad"	James Burrows	Katie Palmer	February 15, 2000	63412	11.96	6.3/15
Will's father comes to town to accept a lifetime achievement award from his company. Will, who has always gotten along well with his father, takes Grace to the ceremony to surprise his dad. He finds out that his dad has been telling all his colleagues that Will is straight and married to Grace. Although Grace attacks the role of Will's wife with relish, Will confronts his father about the lie. Will tells his father that he understands that he had to do what he had to do, and guilts his father into basically turning his entire award-acceptance speech into a diatribe on how much he loves his gay son. Will's father's appearance reminds Jack of the fact that he has no idea who his biological father is. Karen takes it upon herself to hire a private investigator and finds Jack's dad. She sets up a mysterious meeting for them, and they start hitting on each other before Karen shows up and tells them why they're actually meeting. The mysterious man claims that he's gay and always has been, and so couldn't possibly be Jack's dad, so they plan a date instead of a family reunion.
36	14	"Acting Out"	James Burrows	David Kohan & Max Mutchnick	February 22, 2000	63413	12.53	6.5/16
When a scheduled kiss between two gay TV characters doesn't happen, Jack gets very upset and convinces Will to protest at NBC with him. When they are rebuffed by the president's office, they see Al Roker doing "The Today Show" on the streets of New York, and go to talk to him. When Al ignores Jack asking how long he will have to wait to see a gay kiss on TV, Will grabs Jack and kisses him. Grace can't find a way to break up with her very sweet but very annoying boyfriend, Josh. She finally takes Karen's advice and tells Josh that she's in love with Will... right before they see Will kissing Jack on national television.
37	15	"Advise and Resent"	James Burrows	Jon Kinnally & Tracy Poust	February 29, 2000	63417	12.53	6.8/17
Ben sets up Will on a blind date, and Will reluctantly goes. Will and his date Charlie actually get along, but when Charlie doesn't call after three days, Will fears he's a bad date. After Jack gives Will some terrible counseling on how to be a better date, Jack finally tells Will that he should call Charlie and not be a wuss and wait for him to call. Just as Will finally gets the guts up to call, he sees Charlie in the very restaurant where he's eating with Jack. Grace is happily dating Josh, but would like to change some things about him like his cheap "nature" gifts and his indecisiveness. Karen recommends Grace try withholding sex to implement her changes, and against her better judgement, Grace does so and Josh breaks up with her. When Josh comes storming into her office ranting about how he won't change for anyone and she has to take him as he is, his decisiveness and forcefulness turn her on and she jumps him.
38	16	"Hey La, Hey La, My Ex-Boyfriend's Back"	James Burrows	Jeff Greenstein	March 14, 2000	63416	10.45	5.6/15
Will's former boyfriend Michael is back in town and they run into each other since Grace is decorating Michael's new apartment. Will feels like he gets a vibe from Michael that he might be interested in getting back together, so he goes over to Michael's place and makes a fool of himself when he meets Michael's new boyfriend. Will blows up at Grace for not telling him about it, when he's actually upset with himself over the fact that Michael has moved on and Will doesn't seem to be able to. Karen has aspirations of being an interior decorator, and wants to be the one to decorate Michael's apartment, but Grace is only willing to let her do one chair, which is enough to make Karen's head spin.
39	17	"The Hospital Show"	James Burrows	Adam Barr	March 28, 2000	63420	12.26	6.2/16
Will is on a date with a friend of the family who is incredibly annoying, and has Grace call him with a fake emergency to get him out of it. It turns out Grace's emergency is real when Karen's husband Stan is admitted to the hospital with a supposed heart attack. Will, Grace, Jack, and Rosario are in the waiting room arguing over who Karen will turn to for support, and they end up making a bet on it. Meanwhile, the doctor not only informs Karen that her husband is fine and didn't have a heart attack, but tells her about her friends making the bet. In order to torture them, Karen gets them all to do things they hate: Grace gives blood, Rosario cleans the hospital, Jack cuts up his credit cards, and Will makes nice to his annoying date of earlier. Then she lets them know that they tried to play with her, and she won, and reminds them that she doesn't do emotion. She does, however, end up breaking down to Grace at the end.
40	18	"Sweet and Sour Charity"	James Burrows	Gail Lerner	April 4, 2000	63415	11.71	6.1/16
Grace begs God to help her and Will win Joni Mitchell concert tickets, and so when they actually win, Grace convinces Will to help direct a kids' play at a local church. When the play performance time is moved to coincide with that of Joni Mitchell concert, Grace bags the play for the concert. Grace ends up showing up in time for the play because she got kicked out of the concert for singing too loud. Pushed by Grace, Jack helps Karen donate some clothing to charity. Jack accidentally donates Karen's favorite Chanel sling-back heels, and Karen goes to retrieve them. She and a homeless woman each find one of the shoes at the same time, and Karen bargains the woman down to five to get her other shoe back. As Karen is counting out hundreds, she hears the woman murmur how five dollars will make her day. Karen gives the woman the five dollars, and then gives her a few hundred on top when she sees how much the woman values the tiny amount of money.
41	19	"An Affair to Forget"	James Burrows	Alex Herschlag & Laura Kightlinger	April 18, 2000	63418	12.15	6.4/18
Will & Grace's best friends, Rob and Ellen, announce that they're getting married. Rob asks Will to be his best man, and Will happily accepts. Ellen asks Grace to be her maid of honor, and Grace stumbles around awkwardly for a moment before agreeing. When the happy couple leaves, Grace tells Will that she and Rob slept together the last time Rob and Ellen broke up. Later, Will is throwing the bachelor party while a guilty Grace has the bridal shower. Jack freaks out when the stripper at the bachelor party gives him a lap dance that actually turns him on, but is relieved when he finds out that the stripper is actually a preoperative trans woman. Ellen overhears Will and Grace talking about the fact that Grace slept with Rob, and freaks out, calling Rob and Grace terrible names and saying the wedding is off. After Ellen tries to seduce Will to even the score, Rob and Ellen finally make up in Will's bed.
42	20	"Girls, Interrupted"	James Burrows	Jon Kinnally & Tracy Poust & Jhoni Marchinko	May 2, 2000	63422	12.06	6.6/17
Grace and Val unexpectedly bond over their miserable Saturday nights, and become friends. However, when Grace's music box goes missing, she suspects Val, and convinces Will to snoop in her apartment. At a club, Jack meets Bill (Neil Patrick Harris), and is disgusted to find out he is running a support group for ex-gays. To woo him, he and Karen infiltrate the meeting as a straight couple.
43	21	"There But for the Grace of Grace"	James Burrows	Michelle Bochner	May 9, 2000	63419	11.93	6.4/17
Will and Grace visit an old college professor and his female best friend, and fear that they will become just like them once they are old. Jack and Ben help Karen learn how to cook, but the two men start competing over everything.
44	22	"My Best Friend's Tush"	James Burrows	Ellen Idelson & Rob Lotterstein	May 16, 2000	63421	11.97	6.4/17
Jack asks for Will's help in funding a product that he has designed. Grace goes for a job against a high-profile designer (Joan Collins). Will and Jack go into business together to market a subway butt-pillow.
45	23	"Ben? Her?"	James Burrows	David Kohan & Max Mutchnick	May 23, 2000	63423-63424	15.52	8.5/21
46	24	"Ben? Her?"	James Burrows	David Kohan & Max Mutchnick	May 23, 2000	63423-63424	15.52	8.5/21
Will tries to get Grace and his boss, Ben, to get along, and they get along so well that they end up in bed together. Will decides he's not going to freak out about it. Rosario tells Jack that she wants a divorce so she can marry the gardener. Jack decides to sue Karen to keep him in the lifestyle that he's become accustomed to. Will helps Jack, but Ben tells him he can't because Karen is their client. On top of this, Will discovers Ben cheating on Grace, so he quits his job. Will realizes that Ben and Grace are actually both dating other people, and are both okay with this. He can't believe he quit his job over this. Jack loses miserably in his lawsuit against Karen, and so he moves in with Will. Due to all the crises with his friends, Will keeps putting off a date with a cute lawyer he met until the cute lawyer finally gives up on him. Will is depressed with his life, although glad that he can finally tell Karen off now that she's no longer a client since he quit. Will runs away to a tropical island, leaving Jack and Grace bereft. Ben hunts him down and gives him everything he asks for so that he'll help a client on the tropical island with some tax problems. The client turns out to be Karen.
