= Will & Grace season 1 =

Will & Grace
- Season 1
- American DVD cover
- No. of episodes: 22

Release
- Original network: NBC
- Original release: September 21, 1998 – May 13, 1999

Season chronology
- Next → Season 2

The first season of Will & Grace premiered on September 21, 1998, and concluded on May 13, 1999. It consisted of 22 episodes.

== Cast and characters ==
=== Main cast ===
- Eric McCormack as Will Truman
- Debra Messing as Grace Adler
- Megan Mullally as Karen Walker
- Sean Hayes as Jack McFarland
- Gary Grubbs as Harlin Polk

=== Recurring cast ===
- Shelley Morrison as Rosario Salazar
- Tom Gallop as Rob
- Leigh-Allyn Baker as Ellen

=== Special guest stars ===
- Rudy Galindo as himself
- Debbie Reynolds as Bobbi Adler
- Molly Shannon as Val Bassett

=== Guest stars ===
- Beth Lapides as Ione
- Julian McMahon as Guy in Elevator
- Wendie Jo Sperber as April
- Raphael Sbarge as Alex
- John Slattery as Sam Truman
- David Sutcliffe as Campbell
- Miguel Ferrer as Nathan Berry
- Tom Verica as Danny

== Episodes ==
| No. overall | No. in season | Title | Directed by | Written by | Original release date | Prod. code | U.S. viewers (millions) |
|---|---|---|---|---|---|---|---|
| 1 | 1 | "Pilot" "Love and Marriage" | James Burrows | David Kohan & Max Mutchnick | September 21, 1998 | 62801 | 11.82 |
Grace gets an unexpected marriage proposal and her best friend Will deals with his own feelings about her proposal. Will advises Grace against marrying Danny and she freaks out.
| 2 | 2 | "A New Lease on Life" | James Burrows | David Kohan & Max Mutchnick | September 28, 1998 | 62802 | 11.11 |
With nowhere to stay, Grace turns to Will for shelter. First he dismisses her idea of living together, but later agrees. Will's friend Jack meets Grace's assistant Karen.
| 3 | 3 | "Head Case" | James Burrows | David Kohan & Max Mutchnick | October 5, 1998 | 62803 | 11.07 |
Grace makes plans to create one large bathroom out of her and Will's individual spaces in the apartment. Will dislikes the idea, but forces himself to agree to prove that he knows how to compromise. The change leads to Will revealing his fears about why his relationships end in failure. Meanwhile, Jack needs help working on his resume, and Karen reluctantly takes on more responsibility in Grace's office.
| 4 | 4 | "Between a Rock and Harlin's Place" | James Burrows | David Kohan & Max Mutchnick | October 12, 1998 | 62804 | 12.51 |
Grace designs a room for Will's boss, Harlin, which Will dislikes. Jack begins his singing career with his first show of Just Jack.
| 5 | 5 | "Boo! Humbug" | James Burrows | Jon Kinnally & Tracy Poust | October 26, 1998 | 62807 | 8.55 |
On Halloween, Will and Grace plan to ignore the holiday--but they are forced to baby-sit Harlin's two children, and eventually get into the spirit of the evening. Jack and Karen dress up and spend a night on the town, and Karen becomes very popular with some drag queens.
| 6 | 6 | "William, Tell" | James Burrows | William Lucas Walker | November 9, 1998 | 62806 | 8.45 |
Grace brags that she and Will are the best of friends, with no secrets from each other--but when Jack reveals that Will briefly had an affair that Grace didn't know about, she becomes fearful that he might be hiding things from her. Karen privately hires Will when she begins to consider divorcing her husband Stanley, and her insistence on secrecy only makes Grace more paranoid.
| 7 | 7 | "Where There's a Will, There's No Way" | James Burrows | Jhoni Marchinko | November 16, 1998 | 62808 | 7.46 |
Grace fears that Will is the reason that she has no interest in dating men. Jack faces trouble when the IRS catches up to him regarding his tax evasion.
| 8 | 8 | "The Buying Game" | James Burrows | Dava Savel | November 30, 1998 | 62809 | 9.59 |
Grace asks for Will's help in buying the studio that serves as her office space. They end up competing to see who can get the lowest price from the owner. Jack begins a career in massage therapy, taking on Karen as his first client.
| 9 | 9 | "The Truth About Will and Dogs" | James Burrows | David Kohan & Max Mutchnick | December 15, 1998 | 62810 | 12.06 |
Grace feels left out when all of her friends talk about their dogs, so she adopts an adorable Yellow Lab puppy. Though Will initially hates the idea, he soon becomes obsessed with the puppy, and Grace realizes that he is lonely for companionship. Meanwhile, Karen and Jack become the puppy's dogsitters, and Karen has some fun by thinning Grace's closet of outfits she deems ugly.
| 10 | 10 | "The Big Vent" | James Burrows | Story by : Tracy Poust and Jon Kinnally; Teleplay by : Jhoni Marchinko | January 5, 1999 | 62811 | 13.07 |
Will and Grace find entertainment in listening to the conversations through their heating vent. Jack writes and performs a play that expresses his dismay over the fact that Will and Grace are ignoring him.
| 11 | 11 | "Will on Ice" | James Burrows | Michael Patrick King | January 12, 1999 | 62805 | 13.60 |
It's Will's birthday, and everyone goes to see Champions on Ice--even though Will doesn't want to (but pretends that he is okay). Grace and Jack find a mutual interest in figure skating.
| 12 | 12 | "My Fair Maid-y" | James Burrows | Adam Barr | February 2, 1999 | 62812 | 12.24 |
When Grace nears a nervous breakdown during a design competition, Will hires a cleaning lady named April to organize the apartment. Grace soon becomes dependent on April's odd brand of moral support, frustrating Will. Jack lands a date with a cute graduate student in a bookstore, but inadvertently ruins a potential relationship when he pretends to be a lawyer.
| 13 | 13 | "The Unsinkable Mommy Adler" | James Burrows | Alex Herschlag | February 9, 1999 | 62814 | 12.09 |
Grace's mother Bobbi (Debbie Reynolds), an actress with a big ego, comes to town for a visit and drives Grace crazy with passive-aggressive criticisms and suggestions, such as her marrying Will. But it's Will who hurts Grace most of all when he remarks that even if he was straight, he wouldn't want to be her husband. Karen finds out that her period is late, and faces conflicting emotions about her possible pregnancy. The episode is a subtle homage to Reynolds acting career, naming it after her 1964 movie The Unsinkable Molly Brown, singing with Karen a line from Singin' in the Rain and Jack renting a Star Wars video, that features Reynolds daughter Carrie Fisher.
| 14 | 14 | "Big Brother Is Coming" | James Burrows | David Kohan & Max Mutchnick | February 16, 1999 | 62816 | 11.75 |
| 15 | 15 | "Big Brother Is Coming" | James Burrows | David Kohan & Max Mutchnick | February 23, 1999 | 62817 | 11.85 |
Part I: Will refuses to reconnect with his estranged brother, Sam. Grace and Sam have a fling. Part II: Will finds out about Grace sleeping with his brother, and although he's initially upset, he comes to terms with the fact that he really has not right to tell her who she can and can't sleep with.
| 16 | 16 | "Yours, Mine or Ours" | James Burrows | Ellen Idelson & Rob Lotterstein | March 2, 1999 | 62818 | 10.85 |
Will and Grace invite the same man over for a dinner date, and struggle while determining if he is straight or gay. Karen has to fire her driver.
| 17 | 17 | "Secrets and Lays" | James Burrows | Dava Savel | March 23, 1999 | 62813 | 13.25 |
Grace organizes an apparently spontaneous weekend getaway for her, Will, Jack, and Karen to the mountains at Karen's cabin, but the real reason is more emotional: the trip coincides with what would have been Will and Michael's anniversary. Problems arise when Grace runs into an old friend named Campbell, and she finds herself torn between pursuing him and supporting Will, who eventually admits that he does still miss his ex-boyfriend.
| 18 | 18 | "Grace, Replaced" | James Burrows | Katie Palmer | April 8, 1999 | 62821 | 19.08 |
While Grace is consumed by work, Will befriends another woman in the building, Val Bassett (Molly Shannon). Jack is sentenced to community service for slapping a meter maid.
| 19 | 19 | "Will Works Out" | James Burrows | Michael Patrick King & Jon Kinnally & Tracy Poust | April 22, 1999 | 62815 | 17.19 |
When Jack joins Will and Grace's gym, Will becomes upset by his flamboyant behavior and transparent homosexuality, and even calls Jack a fag, a statement which Jack inadvertently overhears. Jack accuses Will of being reluctant to accept his own gayness, and Will is forced to consider that he may be right. Karen and Stan face marital troubles, so Grace suggests she spend some time with a girlfriend to feel better--and ends up inviting Karen over for a night of drinking and bonding.
| 20 | 20 | "Saving Grace" | James Burrows | Jhoni Marchinko | April 29, 1999 | 62820 | 16.89 |
Grace is hired by an arrogant publicist (Miguel Ferrer) under the condition that he gets a date with Will.
| 21 | 21 | "Alley Cats" | James Burrows | Jhoni Marchinko & Alex Herschlag | May 6, 1999 | 62819 | 17.24 |
Will accuses Grace of having too much competitiveness at their game night. Grace tries losing, but proves that Will is just as competitive. Jack teaches Karen CPR, which she reluctantly uses to save a man's life.
| 22 | 22 | "Object of My Rejection" | James Burrows | Adam Barr | May 13, 1999 | 62822 | 18.14 |
After Grace temporarily gets back together with her ex-fiance, Grace and Will realize that their living together may be preventing them from finding mates. Jack marries Karen's maid Rosario so that she can stay in the country.
