= List of Will & Grace episodes =

Will & Grace is an American television sitcom created by David Kohan and Max Mutchnick that aired for eight seasons on NBC from September 21, 1998, to May 18, 2006, and resumed on September 28, 2017. The show earned sixteen Emmy Awards, and 83 nominations. Will & Grace is set in New York City and focuses on Will Truman, a gay lawyer, and his best friend Grace Adler, a straight woman who runs her own interior design firm. Also featured are their friends Karen Walker, a rich socialite; Jack McFarland, a struggling gay actor/singer/dancer who also has had brief careers as a choreographer, cater-waiter, nurse and talk show host; and Rosario Salazar, Karen's maid with whom she has a love-hate relationship.

Despite initial criticism for its particular portrayal of gay people, Will & Grace is the most successful series portraying gay principal characters, as it went on to become a staple of NBC's Must See TV Thursday night lineup where it was ensconced in the Nielsen Top 20 for half of its network run. Every episode of the series was directed by James Burrows, one of the show's executive producers. In January 2017, NBC announced that the series would return for a 12-episode season during the 2017–18 season. All four principal cast members (Debra Messing, Eric McCormack, Sean Hayes, and Megan Mullally) confirmed their return to the revival. An additional four episodes were ordered on August 3, 2017, for a total of 16, and a tenth and eleventh season were also ordered.

During the course of the series, 246 episodes of Will & Grace aired, concluding on April 23, 2020.

== Series overview ==
Season	Episodes	Originally released		Rank	Rating	Viewers (millions)
Season	Episodes	First released	Last released	Rank	Rating	Viewers (millions)
1	22	September 21, 1998	May 13, 1999	40	—N/a	12.72
2	24	September 21, 1999	May 23, 2000	44	—N/a	12.96
3	25	October 12, 2000	May 17, 2001	14	11.3	18.66
4	27	September 27, 2001	May 16, 2002	9	11.0	18.43
5	24	September 26, 2002	May 15, 2003	11	11.0	18.34
6	24	September 25, 2003	April 29, 2004	13	10.4	15.79
7	24	September 16, 2004	May 19, 2005	44	—N/a	10.41
8	24	September 29, 2005	May 18, 2006	61	—N/a	9.08
Webisode	1	September 23, 2016		—N/a	—N/a	—N/a
9	16	September 28, 2017	April 5, 2018	36	—N/a	8.85
10	18	October 4, 2018	April 4, 2019	72	—N/a	5.31
11	18	October 24, 2019	April 23, 2020	82	—N/a	4.01
Special		April 23, 2020		—N/a	—N/a	2.97

== Episodes ==
=== Season 1 (1998–99) ===
No. overall	No. in season	Title	Directed by	Written by	Original release date	Prod. code	U.S. viewers (millions)
1	1	"Pilot" "Love and Marriage"	James Burrows	David Kohan & Max Mutchnick	September 21, 1998	62801	11.82
2	2	"A New Lease on Life"	James Burrows	David Kohan & Max Mutchnick	September 28, 1998	62802	11.11
3	3	"Head Case"	James Burrows	David Kohan & Max Mutchnick	October 5, 1998	62803	11.07
4	4	"Between a Rock and Harlin's Place"	James Burrows	David Kohan & Max Mutchnick	October 12, 1998	62804	12.51
5	5	"Boo! Humbug"	James Burrows	Jon Kinnally & Tracy Poust	October 26, 1998	62807	8.55
6	6	"William, Tell"	James Burrows	William Lucas Walker	November 9, 1998	62806	8.45
7	7	"Where There's a Will, There's No Way"	James Burrows	Jhoni Marchinko	November 16, 1998	62808	7.46
8	8	"The Buying Game"	James Burrows	Dava Savel	November 30, 1998	62809	9.59
9	9	"The Truth About Will and Dogs"	James Burrows	David Kohan & Max Mutchnick	December 15, 1998	62810	12.06
10	10	"The Big Vent"	James Burrows	Story by : Tracy Poust and Jon Kinnally; Teleplay by : Jhoni Marchinko	January 5, 1999	62811	13.07
11	11	"Will on Ice"	James Burrows	Michael Patrick King	January 12, 1999	62805	13.60
12	12	"My Fair Maid-y"	James Burrows	Adam Barr	February 2, 1999	62812	12.24
13	13	"The Unsinkable Mommy Adler"	James Burrows	Alex Herschlag	February 9, 1999	62814	12.09
14	14	"Big Brother Is Coming: Part I"	James Burrows	David Kohan & Max Mutchnick	February 16, 1999	62816	11.75
15	15	"Big Brother Is Coming: Part II"	James Burrows	David Kohan & Max Mutchnick	February 23, 1999	62817	11.85
16	16	"Yours, Mine or Ours"	James Burrows	Ellen Idelson & Rob Lotterstein	March 2, 1999	62818	10.85
17	17	"Secrets and Lays"	James Burrows	Dava Savel	March 23, 1999	62813	13.25
18	18	"Grace, Replaced"	James Burrows	Katie Palmer	April 8, 1999	62821	19.08
19	19	"Will Works Out"	James Burrows	Michael Patrick King & Jon Kinnally & Tracy Poust	April 22, 1999	62815	17.19
20	20	"Saving Grace"	James Burrows	Jhoni Marchinko	April 29, 1999	62820	16.89
21	21	"Alley Cats"	James Burrows	Jhoni Marchinko & Alex Herschlag	May 6, 1999	62819	17.24
22	22	"Object of My Rejection"	James Burrows	Adam Barr	May 13, 1999	62822	18.14

=== Season 2 (1999–2000) ===
No. overall	No. in season	Title	Directed by	Written by	Original release date	Prod. code	Viewers (millions)	Rating/share (18–49)
23	1	"Guess Who's Not Coming to Dinner"	James Burrows	David Kohan & Max Mutchnick	September 21, 1999	63401	16.09	8.72/22
24	2	"Election"	James Burrows	Adam Barr	September 28, 1999	63402	12.99	6.1/16
25	3	"Das Boob"	James Burrows	Jhoni Marchinko	November 2, 1999	63406	12.94	6.4/16
26	4	"Whose Mom is it Anyway?"	James Burrows	Alex Herschlag	November 9, 1999	63405	11.82	6.0/15
27	5	"Polk Defeats Truman"	James Burrows	Jeff Greenstein	November 16, 1999	63404	12.41	6.2/15
28	6	"To Serve and Disinfect"	James Burrows	Katie Palmer	November 23, 1999	63407	11.83	6.2/16
29	7	"Homo for the Holidays"	James Burrows	Alex Herschlag	November 25, 1999	63408	19.15	8.8/22
30	8	"Terms of Employment"	James Burrows	David Kohan & Max Mutchnick	November 30, 1999	63409	11.61	5.8/15
31	9	"I Never Promised You An Olive Garden"	James Burrows	Jon Kinnally & Tracy Poust	December 14, 1999	63403	12.02	6.1/16
32	10	"Tea and a Total Lack of Sympathy"	James Burrows	Jon Kinnally & Tracy Poust	January 11, 2000	63410	13.44	6.9/17
33	11	"Seeds of Discontent"	James Burrows	Jhoni Marchinko	January 25, 2000	63414	12.56	6.9/16
34	12	"He's Come Undone"	James Burrows	Adam Barr	February 8, 2000	63411	13.70	7.3/18
35	13	"Oh Dad, Poor Dad, He's Kept Me in the Closet and I'm So Sad"	James Burrows	Katie Palmer	February 15, 2000	63412	11.96	6.3/15
36	14	"Acting Out"	James Burrows	David Kohan & Max Mutchnick	February 22, 2000	63413	12.53	6.5/16
37	15	"Advise and Resent"	James Burrows	Jon Kinnally & Tracy Poust	February 29, 2000	63417	12.53	6.8/17
38	16	"Hey La, Hey La, My Ex-Boyfriend's Back"	James Burrows	Jeff Greenstein	March 14, 2000	63416	10.45	5.6/15
39	17	"The Hospital Show"	James Burrows	Adam Barr	March 28, 2000	63420	12.26	6.2/16
40	18	"Sweet and Sour Charity"	James Burrows	Gail Lerner	April 4, 2000	63415	11.71	6.1/16
41	19	"An Affair to Forget"	James Burrows	Alex Herschlag & Laura Kightlinger	April 18, 2000	63418	12.15	6.4/18
42	20	"Girls, Interrupted"	James Burrows	Jon Kinnally & Tracy Poust & Jhoni Marchinko	May 2, 2000	63422	12.06	6.6/17
43	21	"There But for the Grace of Grace"	James Burrows	Michelle Bochner	May 9, 2000	63419	11.93	6.4/17
44	22	"My Best Friend's Tush"	James Burrows	Ellen Idelson & Rob Lotterstein	May 16, 2000	63421	11.97	6.4/17
45	23	"Ben? Her?"	James Burrows	David Kohan & Max Mutchnick	May 23, 2000	63423-63424	15.52	8.5/21
46	24	"Ben? Her?"	James Burrows	David Kohan & Max Mutchnick	May 23, 2000	63423-63424	15.52	8.5/21

=== Season 3 (2000–01) ===
No. overall	No. in season	Title	Directed by	Written by	Original release date	Prod. code	U.S. viewers (millions)
47	1	"New Will City"	James Burrows	David Kohan & Max Mutchnick	October 12, 2000	63801	24.32
48	2	"Fear and Clothing"	James Burrows	Adam Barr	October 19, 2000	63802	19.82
49	3	"Husbands and Trophy Wives"	James Burrows	Kari Lizer	October 19, 2000	63804	18.59
50	4	"Girl Trouble"	James Burrows	Alex Herschlag	October 26, 2000	63807	17.54
51	5	"Grace 0, Jack 2000"	James Burrows	Tracy Poust & Jon Kinnally	November 2, 2000	63805	19.68
52	6	"Love Plus One"	James Burrows	Richard Rosenstock	November 9, 2000	63809	18.20
53	7	"Gypsies, Tramps and Weed"	James Burrows	Katie Palmer	November 16, 2000	63806	22.33
54	8	"Lows in the Mid-Eighties"	James Burrows	Jeff Greenstein	November 23, 2000	63810-63811	18.28
55	9	"Lows in the Mid-Eighties"	James Burrows	Jeff Greenstein	November 23, 2000	63810-63811	18.28
56	10	"Three's a Crowd, Six is a Freak Show"	James Burrows	Jhoni Marchinko	December 14, 2000	63803	20.77
57	11	"Coffee and Commitment"	James Burrows	Adam Barr	January 4, 2001	63808	20.36
58	12	"Swimming Pools... Movie Stars"	James Burrows	Katie Palmer	January 11, 2001	63812	19.86
59	13	"Crazy in Love"	James Burrows	Tracy Poust & Jon Kinnally	February 1, 2001	63813	20.38
60	14	"Brothers, A Love Story"	James Burrows	David Kohan & Max Mutchnick	February 8, 2001	63815	19.21
61	15	"My Uncle the Car"	James Burrows	Kari Lizer	February 15, 2001	63814	19.18
62	16	"Cheaters"	James Burrows	Alex Herschlag	February 22, 2001	63816A-63816B	18.51
63	17	"Cheaters"	James Burrows	Alex Herschlag	February 22, 2001	63816A-63816B	18.51
64	18	"Mad Dogs and Average Men"	James Burrows	Adam Barr	March 15, 2001	63819	16.84
65	19	"Poker? I Don't Even Like Her"	James Burrows	Jeanette Collins & Mimi Friedman	March 29, 2001	63817	16.66
66	20	"An Old-Fashioned Piano Party"	James Burrows	Jhoni Marchinko & Tracy Poust & Jon Kinnally	April 19, 2001	63820	13.97
67	21	"The Young and the Tactless"	James Burrows	Jeff Greenstein	April 26, 2001	63821	15.90
68	22	"Alice Doesn't Lisp Here Anymore"	James Burrows	Sally Bradford	May 3, 2001	63818	14.06
69	23	"Last of the Really Odd Lovers"	James Burrows	Kari Lizer	May 10, 2001	63822	14.17
70	24	"Sons and Lovers"	James Burrows	David Kohan & Max Mutchnick	May 17, 2001	63823-63824	20.50
71	25	"Sons and Lovers"	James Burrows	David Kohan & Max Mutchnick	May 17, 2001	63823-63824	20.50

=== Season 4 (2001–02) ===
No. overall	No. in season	Title	Directed by	Written by	Original release date	Prod. code	U.S. viewers (millions)
72	1	"The Third Wheel Gets the Grace"	James Burrows	David Kohan & Max Mutchnick	September 27, 2001	64401	20.64
73	2	"Past and Presents"	James Burrows	Tracy Poust & Jon Kinnally	October 4, 2001	64405	19.54
74	3	"Crouching Father, Hidden Husband"	James Burrows	Adam Barr	October 11, 2001	64402	19.64
75	4	"Prison Blues"	James Burrows	Alex Herschlag	October 18, 2001	64403	16.26
76	5	"Loose Lips Sink Relationships"	James Burrows	Kari Lizer	October 25, 2001	64406	16.20
77	6	"The Rules of Engagement"	James Burrows	Jeff Greenstein	November 1, 2001	64407	18.75
78	7	"Bed, Bath, and Beyond"	James Burrows	Jhoni Marchinko	November 8, 2001	64404	19.16
79	8	"Star-Spangled Banter"	James Burrows	Cynthia Mort	November 15, 2001	64410	16.59
80	9	"Moveable Feast"	James Burrows	Kari Lizer	November 22, 2001	64408-64409 (Note: These episodes originally aired as a single double-length episode but are sometimes split into two episodes for syndication, reruns and DVD presentation.)	17.82
81	10	"Moveable Feast"	James Burrows	Kari Lizer	November 22, 2001	64408-64409	17.82
82	11	"Stakin' Care of Business"	James Burrows	Bill Wrubel	December 6, 2001	64411	16.21
83	12	"Jingle Balls"	James Burrows	Laura Kightlinger	December 13, 2001	64413	19.38
84	13	"Whoa, Nelly"	James Burrows	Adam Barr	January 10, 2002	64412	18.35
85	14	"Grace in the Hole"	James Burrows	Bill Wrubel	January 17, 2002	64415	17.60
86	15	"Dyeing Is Easy, Comedy Is Hard"	James Burrows	Darlene Hunt	January 31, 2002	64414	19.91
87	16	"A Chorus Lie"	James Burrows	Tracy Poust & Jon Kinnally	February 7, 2002	64418	25.30
88	17	"Someone Old, Someplace New"	James Burrows	Story by : Jeff Greenstein; Teleplay by : Jhoni Marchinko & Alex Herschlag	February 28, 2002	64416	18.17
89	18	"Something Borrowed, Someone's Due"	James Burrows	Story by : Kari Lizer; Teleplay by : Bill Wrubel & Adam Barr	March 7, 2002	64417	18.50
90	19	"Cheatin' Trouble Blues"	James Burrows	Alex Herschlag	March 28, 2002	64422	15.31
91	20	"Went to a Garden Potty"	James Burrows	Story by : Sally Bradford; Teleplay by : Tracy Poust & Jon Kinnally	April 4, 2002	64423	16.14
92	21	"He Shoots, They Snore"	James Burrows	Sally Bradford	April 11, 2002	64419	16.30
93	22	"Wedding Balls"	James Burrows	Laura Kightlinger	April 18, 2002	64420	15.81
94	23	"Fagel Attraction"	James Burrows	Jenji Kohan	April 25, 2002	64421	15.67
95	24	"Hocus Focus"	James Burrows	Sally Bradford	May 2, 2002	64424	17.02
96	25	"A Buncha White Chicks Sittin' Around Talkin'"	James Burrows	David Kohan & Max Mutchnick	May 9, 2002	64425	18.13
97	26	"A.I.: Artificial Insemination"	James Burrows	Story by : Kari Lizer & Jhoni Marchinko; Teleplay by : Adam Barr & Jeff Greenstein & Alex Herschlag	May 16, 2002	64426-64427	23.65
98	27	"A.I.: Artificial Insemination"	James Burrows	Story by : Kari Lizer & Jhoni Marchinko; Teleplay by : Adam Barr & Jeff Greenstein & Alex Herschlag	May 16, 2002	64426-64427	23.65

=== Season 5 (2002–03) ===
No. overall	No. in season	Title	Directed by	Written by	Original release date	Prod. code	U.S. viewers (millions)
99	1	"...And the Horse He Rode in On"	James Burrows	Adam Barr	September 26, 2002	5002	21.45
100	2	"Bacon and Eggs"	James Burrows	Alex Herschlag	October 3, 2002	5001	20.64
101	3	"The Kid Stays Out of the Picture"	James Burrows	Jhoni Marchinko	October 10, 2002	5003	20.19
102	4	"Humongous Growth"	James Burrows	Kari Lizer	October 17, 2002	5004	19.54
103	5	"It's the Gay Pumpkin, Charlie Brown"	James Burrows	Gary Janetti	October 31, 2002	5005	17.21
104	6	"Boardroom and a Parked Place"	James Burrows	Gail Lerner	November 7, 2002	5007	21.40
105	7	"The Needle and the Omelet's Done"	James Burrows	Tracy Poust & Jon Kinnally	November 14, 2002	5006	19.09
106	8	"Marry Me a Little, Marry Me a Little More"	James Burrows	Jeff Greenstein & Bill Wrubel	November 21, 2002	5008	24.26
107	9	"Marry Me a Little, Marry Me a Little More"	James Burrows	Jeff Greenstein & Bill Wrubel	November 21, 2002	5009	24.26
108	10	"The Honeymoon's Over"	James Burrows	Sally Bradford	December 5, 2002	5010	19.32
109	11	"All About Christmas Eve"	James Burrows	Adam Barr	December 12, 2002	5011	16.21
110	12	"Field of Queens"	James Burrows	Katie Palmer	January 9, 2003	5012	16.25
111	13	"Fagmalion Part I: Gay It Forward"	James Burrows	Tracy Poust & Jon Kinnally	January 16, 2003	5013	15.97
112	14	"Fagmalion Part II: Attack of the Clones"	James Burrows	Gary Janetti	January 30, 2003	5014	15.77
113	15	"Homojo"	James Burrows	Bill Wrubel	February 6, 2003	5015	16.49
114	16	"Women and Children First"	James Burrows	Laura Kightlinger	February 13, 2003	5017	18.71
115	17	"Fagmalion Part III: Bye, Bye, Beardy"	James Burrows	Alex Herschlag	February 20, 2003	5016	16.41
116	18	"Fagmalion Part IV: The Guy Who Loved Me"	James Burrows	Gail Lerner	March 13, 2003	5018	15.01
117	19	"Sex, Losers, and Videotape"	James Burrows	Steve Gabriel	April 3, 2003	5019	15.04
118	20	"Leo Unwrapped"	James Burrows	Sonja Warfield	April 17, 2003	5020	14.69
119	21	"Dolls and Dolls"	James Burrows	Kari Lizer	April 24, 2003	5022	17.71
120	22	"May Divorce Be with You"	James Burrows	Sally Bradford	May 1, 2003	5021	17.15
121	23	"23"	James Burrows	Adam Barr & Jeff Greenstein & Gary Janetti & Sally Bradford & Alex Herschlag	May 8, 2003	5023	17.10
122	24	"24"	James Burrows	Gail Lerner & Kari Lizer & Jhoni Marchinko & Tracy Poust & Jon Kinnally & Bill Wrubel	May 15, 2003	5024	20.28

=== Season 6 (2003–04) ===
No. overall	No. in season	Title	Directed by	Written by	Original release date	Prod. code	U.S. viewers (millions)
123	1	"Dames at Sea"	James Burrows	Adam Barr	September 25, 2003	6001	20.29
124	2	"Last Ex to Brooklyn"	James Burrows	Alex Herschlag	October 2, 2003	6002	16.80
125	3	"Home Court Disadvantage"	James Burrows	Jhoni Marchinko	October 9, 2003	6003	14.56
126	4	"Me and Mr. Jones"	James Burrows	Gary Janetti	October 23, 2003	6004	13.51
127	5	"A-Story, Bee-Story"	James Burrows	Gail Lerner	October 30, 2003	6007	15.89
128	6	"Heart Like a Wheelchair"	James Burrows	Tracy Poust & Jon Kinnally	November 6, 2003	6005	14.68
129	7	"Nice in White Satin"	James Burrows	Bill Wrubel	November 13, 2003	6006	15.21
130	8	"Swimming from Cambodia"	James Burrows	Sonja Warfield	November 20, 2003	6008	16.38
131	9	"Strangers with Candice"	James Burrows	Sally Bradford	December 4, 2003	6009	14.23
132	10	"Fanilow"	James Burrows	Kari Lizer	December 11, 2003	6010	12.82
133	11	"The Accidental Tsuris"	James Burrows	Jeff Greenstein	January 15, 2004	6011	14.95
134	12	"A Gay/December Romance"	James Burrows	Tracy Poust & Jon Kinnally	January 22, 2004	6012	15.71
135	13	"Ice Cream Balls"	James Burrows	Laura Kightlinger	February 10, 2004	6013	10.84
136	14	"Looking for Mr. Good Enough"	James Burrows	Gary Janetti	February 19, 2004	6014	18.91
137	15	"Flip-Flop: Part I"	James Burrows	Adam Barr	February 26, 2004	6015	18.14
138	16	"Flip-Flop: Part II"	James Burrows	Alex Herschlag	March 4, 2004	6016	15.32
139	17	"East Side Story"	James Burrows	Gail Lerner	March 11, 2004	6017	15.61
140	18	"Courting Disaster"	James Burrows	Sally Bradford	March 18, 2004	6018	15.00
141	19	"No Sex 'n' the City"	James Burrows	Steve Gabriel	March 25, 2004	6019	15.94
142	20	"Fred Astaire and Ginger Chicken"	James Burrows	Ain Gordon	April 1, 2004	6020	13.48
143	21	"I Never Cheered for My Father"	James Burrows	Adam Barr	April 8, 2004	6021	13.29
144	22	"Speechless"	James Burrows	Sally Bradford	April 22, 2004	6022	16.36
145	23	"I Do, Oh, No, You Di-in't"	James Burrows	Jeff Greenstein & Jhoni Marchinko	April 29, 2004	6023	20.53
146	24	"I Do, Oh, No, You Di-in't"	James Burrows	Kari Lizer & Sonja Warfield	April 29, 2004	6024	20.53

=== Season 7 (2004–05) ===
No. overall	No. in season	Title	Directed by	Written by	Original release date	Prod. code	U.S. viewers (millions)
147	1	"FYI: I Hurt, Too"	James Burrows	David Flebotte & Alex Herschlag	September 16, 2004	7002	16.55
148	2	"Back Up, Dancer"	James Burrows	Tracy Poust & Jon Kinnally	September 23, 2004	7001	15.32
149	3	"One Gay at a Time"	James Burrows	Sally Bradford	September 30, 2004	7003	12.82
150	4	"Company"	James Burrows	Bill Wrubel	October 7, 2004	7004	12.41
151	5	"Key Party"	James Burrows	Sonja Warfield	October 14, 2004	7005	13.00
152	6	"The Newlydreads"	James Burrows	Kate Angelo	October 21, 2004	7006	10.95
153	7	"Will & Grace & Vince & Nadine"	James Burrows	Gary Janetti	November 4, 2004	7007	11.87
154	8	"Saving Grace, Again: Part I"	James Burrows	Greg Malins	November 11, 2004	7008	11.96
155	9	"Saving Grace, Again: Part II"	James Burrows	Gail Lerner	November 18, 2004	7009	12.02
156	10	"Queens for a Day"	James Burrows	Kirk J. Rudell	November 25, 2004	7010	8.10
157	11	"Queens for a Day"	James Burrows	Kirk J. Rudell	November 25, 2004	7011	8.10
158	12	"Christmas Break"	James Burrows	Bill Wrubel	December 9, 2004	7012	10.14
159	13	"Board Games"	James Burrows	Sally Bradford	January 6, 2005	7013	10.10
160	14	"Partners"	James Burrows	Alex Herschlag	January 13, 2005	7014	9.68
161	15	"Bully Woolley"	James Burrows	Greg Malins	February 3, 2005	7015	9.99
162	16	"Dance Cards and Greeting Cards"	James Burrows	Gail Lerner	February 10, 2005	7016	11.49
163	17	"The Birds and the Bees"	James Burrows	Steve Gabriel	February 17, 2005	7017	9.93
164	18	"The Fabulous Baker Boy"	James Burrows	Kate Angelo	February 24, 2005	7019	9.91
165	19	"Sour Balls"	James Burrows	Laura Kightlinger	March 17, 2005	7018	8.45
166	20	"The Blonde Leading the Blind"	James Burrows	Sonja Warfield	April 21, 2005	7020	8.05
167	21	"It's a Dad, Dad, Dad, Dad World"	James Burrows	Jordana Arkin	May 5, 2005	7021	7.62
168	22	"From Queer to Eternity"	James Burrows	Barry Langer	May 10, 2005	7022	5.42
169	23	"Friends with Benefits"	James Burrows	Tracy Poust & Jon Kinnally	May 19, 2005	7023	7.92
170	24	"Kiss and Tell"	James Burrows	Gary Janetti	May 19, 2005	7024	7.92

=== Season 8 (2005–06) ===
No. overall	No. in season	Title	Directed by	Written by	Original release date	Prod. code	U.S. viewers (millions)
171	1	"Alive and Schticking"	James Burrows	Bill Wrubel	September 29, 2005	8005	9.81
172	2	"I Second That Emotion"	James Burrows	Gary Janetti	October 6, 2005	8001	8.44
173	3	"The Old Man and the Sea"	James Burrows	Greg Malins	October 13, 2005	8002	8.34
174	4	"Steams Like Old Times"	James Burrows	Gail Lerner	October 20, 2005	8003	7.88
175	5	"The Hole Truth"	James Burrows	Sally Bradford	November 3, 2005	8004	7.93
176	6	"Love Is in the Airplane"	James Burrows	Tracy Poust & Jon Kinnally	November 10, 2005	8007	8.85
177	7	"Birds of a Feather Boa"	James Burrows	Abraham Higginbotham	November 17, 2005	8008	8.89
178	8	"Swish Out of Water"	James Burrows	Kirk J. Rudell	November 24, 2005	8006	5.82
179	9	"A Little Christmas Queer"	James Burrows	Jamie Rhonheimer	December 8, 2005	8011	8.79
180	10	"Von Trapped"	James Burrows	Gail Lerner	January 5, 2006	8013	7.95
181	11	"Bathroom Humor"	James Burrows	Greg Malins	January 12, 2006	8014	9.69
182	12	"Forbidden Fruit"	James Burrows	Janis Hirsch	January 19, 2006	8010	7.49
183	13	"Cop to It"	James Burrows	Sally Bradford	January 26, 2006	8012	6.91
184	14	"I Love L. Gay"	James Burrows	Steve Gabriel	February 2, 2006	8015	7.27
185	15	"The Definition of Marriage"	James Burrows	Abraham Higginbotham	February 9, 2006	8016	7.45
186	16	"Grace Expectations"	James Burrows	Janis Hirsch	March 16, 2006	8017	9.09
187	17	"Cowboys and Iranians"	James Burrows	Robia Rashid	March 23, 2006	8009	8.82
188	18	"Buy, Buy Baby"	James Burrows	Kirk J. Rudell	March 30, 2006	8018	9.38
189	19	"Blanket Apology"	James Burrows	James Lecesne	April 6, 2006	8019	8.21
190	20	"The Mourning Son"	James Burrows	Jamie Rhonheimer	April 27, 2006	8020	7.58
191	21	"Partners 'n' Crime"	James Burrows	Josh Silberman & Zack Slovinsky	May 4, 2006	8021	7.00
192	22	"Whatever Happened to Baby Gin?"	James Burrows	Gary Janetti & Tracy Poust & Jon Kinnally	May 11, 2006	8022	9.36
193	23	"The Finale"	James Burrows	David Kohan & Max Mutchnick	May 18, 2006	8023	18.43
194	24	"The Finale"	James Burrows	David Kohan & Max Mutchnick	May 18, 2006	8024	18.43

=== Special ===
Title	Directed by	Written by	Original release date	Prod. code	U.S. viewers (millions)
"Say Goodnight, Gracie"	James Burrows	David Kohan & Max Mutchnick	May 18, 2006	8025	12.91

=== Season 9 (2017–18) ===
No. overall	No. in season	Title	Directed by	Written by	Original release date	U.S. viewers (millions)
195	1	"11 Years Later"	James Burrows	David Kohan & Max Mutchnick	September 28, 2017	10.19
196	2	"Who's Your Daddy"	James Burrows	Tracy Poust & Jon Kinnally	October 5, 2017	7.14
197	3	"Emergency Contact"	James Burrows	Nina Pedrad	October 12, 2017	6.72
198	4	"Grandpa Jack"	James Burrows	Alex Herschlag	October 19, 2017	6.69
199	5	"How to Succeed in Business Without Really Crying"	James Burrows	Suzanne Martin & John Quaintance	October 26, 2017	6.79
200	6	"Rosario's Quinceañera"	James Burrows	Tracy Poust & Jon Kinnally	November 2, 2017	5.74
201	7	"A Gay Olde Christmas"	James Burrows	John Quaintance	December 5, 2017	7.18
202	8	"Friends and Lover"	James Burrows	Suzanne Martin	January 4, 2018	4.90
203	9	"There's Something About Larry"	James Burrows	Alex Herschlag	January 11, 2018	4.17
204	10	"The Wedding"	James Burrows	David Kohan & Max Mutchnick & Tracy Poust & Jon Kinnally	January 18, 2018	4.39
205	11	"Staten Island Fairy"	James Burrows	Story by : David Kohan & Max Mutchnick; Teleplay by : John Quaintance	February 1, 2018	4.12
206	12	"Three Wise Men"	James Burrows	Tracy Poust & Jon Kinnally	March 1, 2018	4.00
207	13	"Sweatshop Annie & the Annoying Baby Shower"	James Burrows	John Quaintance	March 8, 2018	3.92
208	14	"The Beefcake & the Cake Beef"	James Burrows	Suzanne Martin	March 15, 2018	4.71
209	15	"One Job"	James Burrows	Suzanne Martin & Alex Herschlag	March 29, 2018	3.73
210	16	"It's a Family Affair"	James Burrows	David Kohan & Max Mutchnick	April 5, 2018	3.63

=== Season 10 (2018–19) ===
No. overall	No. in season	Title	Directed by	Written by	Original release date	U.S. viewers (millions)
211	1	"The West Side Curmudgeon"	James Burrows	John Quaintance	October 4, 2018	3.96
212	2	"Where in the World is Karen Walker?"	James Burrows	Adam Barr	October 11, 2018	3.40
213	3	"Tex and the City"	James Burrows	John Quaintance	October 18, 2018	3.36
214	4	"Who's Sorry Now?"	James Burrows	Tracy Poust & Jon Kinnally	October 25, 2018	3.22
215	5	"Grace's Secret"	James Burrows	Suzanne Martin	November 1, 2018	3.45
216	6	"Kid 'N Play"	James Burrows	Suzanne Martin	November 15, 2018	2.93
217	7	"So Long, Division"	James Burrows	Adam Barr	November 29, 2018	2.78
218	8	"Anchor Away"	James Burrows	Alex Herschlag	December 6, 2018	2.86
219	9	"Family, Trip"	James Burrows	Tracy Poust & Jon Kinnally	January 31, 2019	3.09
220	10	"Dead Man Texting"	James Burrows	Jordan Reddout & Gus Hickey	February 7, 2019	3.07
221	11	"The Scales of Justice"	James Burrows	Laura Kightlinger	February 14, 2019	2.94
222	12	"The Pursuit of Happiness"	James Burrows	John Quaintance & Adam Barr	February 21, 2019	2.63
223	13	"The Real McCoy"	James Burrows	Alex Herschlag	February 28, 2019	2.35
224	14	"Supreme Courtship"	James Burrows	Jordan Reddout & Gus Hickey	March 7, 2019	2.63
225	15	"Bad Blood"	James Burrows	Adam Barr	March 14, 2019	2.46
226	16	"Conscious Coupling"	James Burrows	Tracy Poust & Jon Kinnally	March 21, 2019	2.96
227	17	"The Things We Do for Love"	James Burrows	John Quaintance	March 28, 2019	3.25
228	18	"Jack's Big Gay Wedding"	James Burrows	Alex Herschlag & Suzanne Martin	April 4, 2019	2.99

=== Season 11 (2019–20) ===
No. overall	No. in season	Title	Directed by	Written by	Original release date	U.S. viewers (millions)
229	1	"Eat, Pray, Love, Phone, Sex"	James Burrows	David Kohan & Max Mutchnick and Jon Kinnally & Tracy Poust	October 24, 2019	2.28
230	2	"Pappa Mia"	James Burrows	Suzanne Martin	October 31, 2019	2.63
231	3	"With Enemies Like These"	James Burrows	John Quaintance	November 7, 2019	2.17
232	4	"The Chick or the Egg Donor"	James Burrows	Jordan Reddout & Gus Hickey	November 14, 2019	2.16
233	5	"The Grief Panda"	James Burrows	Jon Kinnally & Tracy Poust	November 21, 2019	2.19
234	6	"Performance Anxiety"	James Burrows	John Quaintance	January 9, 2020	2.39
235	7	"What a Dump"	James Burrows	Suzanne Martin	January 16, 2020	2.13
236	8	"Lies & Whispers"	James Burrows	Adam Barr	January 23, 2020	2.32
237	9	"Bi-plane"	James Burrows	Aaron Huffines & C.R. Honce	February 6, 2020	2.35
238	10	"Of Mouse and Men"	James Burrows	Adam Barr	February 13, 2020	1.97
239	11	"Accidentally on Porpoise"	James Burrows	Suzanne Martin	February 20, 2020	1.95
240	12	"Filthy Phil, Part I"	James Burrows	Jon Kinnally & Tracy Poust	February 27, 2020	2.06
241	13	"Filthy Phil, Part II"	James Burrows	Adam Barr	March 5, 2020	2.10
242	14	"The Favourite"	James Burrows	Laura Kightlinger	March 12, 2020	2.30
243	15	"Broadway Boundaries"	James Burrows	Jordan Reddout & Gus Hickey	March 19, 2020	2.73
244	16	"We Love Lucy"	James Burrows	John Quaintance	April 9, 2020	2.66
245	17	"New Crib"	James Burrows	Jon Kinnally & Tracy Poust	April 16, 2020	2.46
246	18	"It's Time"	James Burrows	David Kohan & Max Mutchnick	April 23, 2020	3.14

== Webisode ==
No.	Title	Original release date
1	"#VoteHoney"	September 26, 2016
Will and Grace discuss how upset they are about Donald Trump being a candidate for President of the United States. Karen walks in, voicing her support for Trump, followed by Jack, who does not think he is going to vote because he is undecided. Grace tries to convince him to vote for Hillary Clinton, while Karen tries to convince him to vote for Trump. Shelley Morrison makes a cameo as Rosario. The cast reunited to film a 10-minute scene related to the 2016 United States presidential election where the characters talk about the importance of voting and who they think should win the election. It was released on September 26, 2016. After the release of the webisode, it was rumored the show would get a revival, which was later confirmed by NBC in January 2017.

== Special (2020) ==
Title	Directed by	Written by	Original release date	U.S. viewers (millions)
"A Will & Grace-ful Goodbye"	James Burrows	David Kohan & Max Mutchnick	April 23, 2020	2.97

== Ratings ==
Will & Grace : U.S. viewers per episode (millions)

Season	Episode number																										
Season	1	2	3	4	5	6	7	8	9	10	11	12	13	14	15	16	17	18	19	20	21	22	23	24	25	26	27
1	11.82	11.11	11.07	12.51	8.55	8.45	7.46	9.59	12.06	13.07	13.60	12.24	12.09	11.75	11.85	10.85	13.25	19.08	17.19	16.89	17.24	18.14	–				
2	16.09	12.99	12.94	11.82	12.41	11.83	19.15	11.61	12.02	13.44	12.56	13.70	11.96	12.53	12.53	10.45	12.26	11.71	12.15	12.06	11.93	11.97	15.52	15.52	–		
3	24.32	19.82	18.59	17.54	19.68	18.20	22.33	18.28	18.28	20.77	20.36	19.86	20.38	19.21	19.18	18.51	18.51	16.84	16.66	13.97	15.90	14.06	14.17	20.50	20.50	–	
4	20.64	19.54	19.64	16.26	16.20	18.75	19.16	16.59	17.82	17.82	16.21	19.38	18.35	17.60	19.91	25.30	18.17	18.50	15.31	16.14	16.30	15.81	15.67	17.02	18.13	23.65	23.65
5	21.45	20.64	20.19	19.54	17.21	21.40	19.09	24.26	24.26	19.32	16.21	16.25	15.97	15.77	16.49	18.71	16.41	15.01	15.04	14.69	17.71	17.15	17.10	20.28	–		
6	20.29	16.80	14.56	13.51	15.89	14.68	15.21	16.38	14.23	12.82	14.95	15.71	10.84	18.91	18.14	15.32	15.61	15.00	15.94	13.48	13.29	16.36	20.53	20.53	–		
7	16.55	15.32	12.82	12.41	13.00	10.95	11.87	11.96	12.02	8.10	8.10	10.14	10.10	9.68	9.99	11.49	9.93	9.91	8.45	8.05	7.62	5.42	7.92	7.92	–		
8	9.81	8.44	8.34	7.88	7.93	8.85	8.89	5.82	8.79	7.95	9.69	7.49	6.91	7.27	7.45	9.09	8.82	9.38	8.21	7.58	7.00	9.36	18.43	18.43	–		
9	10.19	7.14	6.72	6.69	6.79	5.74	7.18	4.90	4.17	4.39	4.12	4.00	3.92	4.71	3.73	3.63	–										
10	3.96	3.40	3.36	3.22	3.45	2.93	2.78	2.86	3.09	3.07	2.94	2.63	2.35	2.63	2.46	2.96	3.25	2.99	–								
11	2.28	2.63	2.17	2.16	2.19	2.39	2.13	2.32	2.35	1.97	1.95	2.06	2.10	2.30	2.73	2.66	2.46	3.14	–								

Audience measurement performed by Nielsen Media Research
