= Will & Grace season 3 =

Will & Grace
- Season 3
- American DVD cover
- No. of episodes: 25

Release
- Original network: NBC
- Original release: October 12, 2000 – May 17, 2001

Season chronology
- ← Previous; Season 2 Next → Season 4

The third season of Will & Grace premiered on October 12, 2000, and concluded on May 17, 2001. It consisted of 25 episodes.

== Cast and characters ==
=== Main cast ===
- Eric McCormack as Will Truman
- Debra Messing as Grace Adler
- Megan Mullally as Karen Walker
- Sean Hayes as Jack McFarland
- Shelley Morrison as Rosario Salazar

=== Recurring cast ===
- Gregory Hines as Ben Doucette
- Tim Bagley as Larry
- Jerry Levine as Joe
- Tom Gallop as Rob
- Leigh-Allyn Baker as Ellen
- Marshall Manesh as Mr. Zamir
- Leslie Jordan as Beverley Leslie
- Woody Harrelson as Nathan
- Michael Angarano as Elliot

=== Special guest stars ===
- Patrick Dempsey as Matthew
- Jeremy Piven as Nicholas
- Camryn Manheim as Psychic Sue
- Cher as herself
- Debbie Reynolds as Bobbie Adler
- Martina Navratilova as herself
- Sandra Bernhard as herself
- Ellen DeGeneres as Sister Louise
- Sydney Pollack as George Truman
- Lesley Ann Warren as Tina
- Christine Ebersole as Candace Pruytt
- Ellen Albertini Dow as Sylvia Walker
- Molly Shannon as Val Bassett

=== Guest stars ===
- Corey Parker as Josh
- Natasha Lyonne as Gillian
- Maria Pitillo as Paula
- Ever Carradine as Pam
- Sara Rue as Joyce Adler
- Ken Marino as Mark
- Joel McHale as Ian
- Peter Jacobson as Paul Budnik
- Gigi Rice as Heidi Dauro
- Alex Kapp Horner as Alice Robinson
- Todd Stashwick as Gabe Robinson

Following the death of Leslie Jordan in 2022, writer Jeff Greenstein revealed that Joan Collins was in negotiations to reprise her role of Helena Barnes from the previous season episode "My Best Friend's Tush". However, after reading the final script, Collins backed out. The role was rewritten to create the role of Beverly Leslie, who debuted in "My Uncle the Car".

== Episodes ==
No. overall	No. in season	Title	Directed by	Written by	Original release date	Prod. code	U.S. viewers (millions)
47	1	"New Will City"	James Burrows	David Kohan & Max Mutchnick	October 12, 2000	63801	24.32
Will gets sick of Karen bugging him and returns from the tropics to find Jack not only taking his place in his apartment, but also taking his place as Grace's best friend and confidant. Will is jealous until Grace assures him that her love for him will never fade. Grace has been dating both Ben and Josh all summer, and thinks it's time she made a choice. Her choice becomes easier when she finds out Jack screwed around with Josh. On her way back into the country, Karen lets Rosario take the fall for her smuggling in some black pearls. Grace has to convince Karen to get Rosario out of jail by reminding her how much Rosario does for her.
48	2	"Fear and Clothing"	James Burrows	Adam Barr	October 19, 2000	63802	19.82
When someone tries to break into Grace's apartment, she moves in with Will and Jack. Will can't stand living with two other people, so he tells his two friends that one of them will have to move out, and they get to decide which one. After Grace and Jack duke it out for a while, they finally agree that Grace will move back across the hall. When Will hears their decision, he asks Grace to stay with him and suggests that Jack move into Grace's old place. Jack and Karen are still feuding since Jack tried to sue Karen. Will convinces Karen to forgive Jack, and although at first Jack doesn't accept the apology, the two end up bonding over their mutual love of laughing at other people's misfortune.
49	3	"Husbands and Trophy Wives"	James Burrows	Kari Lizer	October 19, 2000	63804	18.59
When Grace joins Ben at the yacht club and sees Karen there, she finds out from Rosario that Karen is insecure because she is reaching the age of Stan's first wife. She tries complimenting Karen to boost her failing ego, but Karen just thinks Grace is a lesbian, so Grace asks Ben to flirt with Karen. Ben successfully does so, but when Stan sees him he gets jealous and has Ben thrown out of the yacht club. Will and Jack go to what they think is going to be a crazy gay weekend in the Hamptons, but what they find is that all of their crazy friends have settled down and are raising babies. Will volunteers himself and Jack to babysit for a night and is disappointed with the results, concluding that he'll make a terrible father. Jack reassures Will that he'll be a great father someday because he's already a great father to Jack.
50	4	"Girl Trouble"	James Burrows	Alex Herschlag	October 26, 2000	63807	17.54
Grace gets a young intern in her office who worships Grace and her work, but Grace's delight is short-lived when the intern quickly remakes herself in Karen's image. Meanwhile, Will is putting together a skit for gay sensitivity seminar for the local police, and asks Jack to act in it along with two lesbians Jack doesn't get along with. Jack manages to remain polite to the lesbians as an acting challenge from Will, but when Will makes fun of Jack's character voice, Jack loses it and insults the lesbians in front of the police audience. Jack and Will end up in a screaming fight that they are terribly embarrassed about, but it turns out that their real insults are actually educational as well.
51	5	"Grace 0, Jack 2000"	James Burrows	Tracy Poust & Jon Kinnally	November 2, 2000	63805	19.68
Grace decides she doesn't love Ben and she should break up with him, but when she does so he refuses to let her. Finally, with help from Karen, Grace convinces herself that she does love Ben, but then Ben breaks up with her. Jack has a new cabaret act, Jack 2000, which does terribly until he adds stand-up that makes fun of Will's personal life. Will is insulted, and stops telling Jack details about his personal life. Jack's act fails when he has no new material and he's depressed about his best friend being mad at him. Karen convinces Will to help Jack out, and Will gives Jack permission to use even his most embarrassing moments, but Jack, reminded of what a good friend Will is, doesn't use them.
52	6	"Love Plus One"	James Burrows	Richard Rosenstock	November 9, 2000	63809	18.20
An old boyfriend of Grace's named Nicholas (Jeremy Piven) comes into town with his new girlfriend and asks Grace to join them for a threesome. When Will and Karen laugh at the thought of Grace in a three-way, she decides to go through with it, but backs out at the last minute. Jack, working his new job at Banana Republic, meets a gorgeous man (Patrick Dempsey) who is such a "smarty" that he can't approach him. Jack uses Will for a Cyrano de Bergerac move and lets Will's words come out of his mouth. Jack soon realizes that his target, Matthew, is boring to him, and Matthew soon realizes that Will is just his type and gives the embarrassed lawyer his card.
53	7	"Gypsies, Tramps and Weed"	James Burrows	Katie Palmer	November 16, 2000	63806	22.33
At Will's birthday dinner the waiter is so rude that Grace complains about him and ends up getting him fired. She feels so badly that she hires him on as her office assistant, but then she's even more disappointed when she finds him dealing pot out of her office. Will sees a psychic who is so strangely right about things that he believes her when she says that he is going to spend the rest of his life with a man that he already knows named Jack. Will is horrified at the thought of spending the rest of his life with Jack, but then he and Jack realize that they could spend the rest of their lives together like the friends they are now. Jack finally gets to meet his idol, Cher in a café, but mistakes her for a drag queen Cher-imitator until she slaps him.
54	8	"Lows in the Mid-Eighties"	James Burrows	Jeff Greenstein	November 23, 2000	63810-63811	18.28
55	9	"Lows in the Mid-Eighties"	James Burrows	Jeff Greenstein	November 23, 2000	63810-63811	18.28
In order to help a confused girl who doesn't realize she is dating a gay man, Will and Grace tell the story of when they dated in college, and Will didn't come out of the closet until after proposing to Grace and meeting her entire family as her fiance.
56	10	"Three's a Crowd, Six is a Freak Show"	James Burrows	Jhoni Marchinko	December 14, 2000	63803	20.77
Grace hides from others after a minor medical procedure leaves her with a sore on her lip, then breaks up with a guy she likes just because he has six toes on one foot and fears this makes her shallow. Will and Jack find out that they're dating the same man. Karen tries to buy a Christmas present for her step-son.
57	11	"Coffee and Commitment"	James Burrows	Adam Barr	January 4, 2001	63808	20.36
Will is tired of always paying for things for Grace, and when they go to their friends' civil union ceremony, he refuses to put her name on the gift he bought. They fight about it, and eventually it comes out that Will feels like Grace is his wife, and he doesn't want that. They make up when they do a reading together about love during the ceremony that brings home to them how they feel about each other. Jack gets addicted to caffeine when he has a crush on a guy who works at a coffee shop. Karen tries to help him quit, but they're both in trouble when they find out that the commitment ceremony is alcohol-free and there's only a coffee bar.
58	12	"Swimming Pools... Movie Stars"	James Burrows	Katie Palmer	January 11, 2001	63812	19.86
Will and Grace meet Sandra Bernhard by posing as prospective buyers of her apartment. Jack ends up in a bidding war for Britney Spears' sneakers, while Karen tries to support her stepson Mason in his swimming games. Sandra tells Will and Grace they resemble Dharma & Greg.
59	13	"Crazy in Love"	James Burrows	Tracy Poust & Jon Kinnally	February 1, 2001	63813	20.38
Will finally calls Matt (Patrick Dempsey), the sports writer he met at Banana Republic forever ago, and they go out on a date. Matt mentions that one of the things he didn't like about his ex-boyfriend was that he hated sports, so Will pretends to be a big jock. Will tries desperately to get better at baseball by going to the batting cages, but only Grace can actually hit a ball. Will and Matt play basketball together and Matt totally busts Will as someone who doesn't like sports. Will explains why he pretended and Matt is surprised that Will thinks he's that shallow. Matt assures Will that they can still date even if Will isn't into sports. Grace forges a note from her therapist saying that she's crazy to get out of jury duty. Karen and Jack ask Grace to redecorate Jack's apartment but they are extremely difficult clients. They accidentally read the note from Grace's therapist and believe that she's actually crazy. She figures out that they read it and uses the fact that they're scared of her to do great work on Jack's apartment without their interference. When she's done, she admits to them that she tricked them but they don't believe her when she says she's not crazy.
60	14	"Brothers, A Love Story"	James Burrows	David Kohan & Max Mutchnick	February 8, 2001	63815	19.21
Will is upset when his boyfriend, Matt, introduces him to his boss as his brother and their relationship becomes strained because Matt is still in the closet. He tries to break up with Matt, but is so desperate for male affection that he wimps out. Grace tries to stand strong for him and be his conscience. When Matt's boss asks Matt straight out if he's gay and Matt denies it in front of Will, Will (by pretending to be Matt's brother as they have a serious discussion in front of his boss) tells Matt that the only way for their 'relationship' to work is if they were both open and honest, hoping for Matt to come out to his boss about his sexuality as well as his relationship with Will but Matt is reluctant to do so. Will is finally so disgusted that he breaks up with Matt. Karen is upset when she finds a copy of Stan's will and realizes that a third of her husband's money is being willed to charity. She blames her husband's bleeding heart lawyer, Will.
61	15	"My Uncle the Car"	James Burrows	Kari Lizer	February 15, 2001	63814	19.18
Jack is misled by a postcard he gets from his mother and thinks his father was African American. Will finally convinces Grace to get rid of the crappy car that her uncle left her and they sell it to a nun who needs it to deliver cheesecakes. When Graces changes her mind and wants the car back, the nun demands almost ten times the amount she paid for it. Will finally makes a deal that they get the car back if they drive the nun on her errands. Karen finds out that Rosario has been cheating on her and cleaning for someone else. Karen confronts her friend that Rosario has been cleaning for and they end up playing pool: the winner gets Rosario. They both cheat and end up duking it out over Rosario. Rosario is so disgusted by the objectification that she says she doesn't want to clean for either of them anymore. Karen laments the loss of her beloved Rosie until Rosario decides to return.
62	16	"Cheaters"	James Burrows	Alex Herschlag	February 22, 2001	63816A-63816B	18.51
63	17	"Cheaters"	James Burrows	Alex Herschlag	February 22, 2001	63816A-63816B	18.51
Will's dad, George, comes to visit New York, but it quickly becomes clear that he came to visit his mistress, not his son. Grace is horrified that Will just wants to deny the affair rather than confronting his father, and even George is surprised when Will invites him and his mistress to dinner and they spend the whole night talking about the weather. Will finally tells his father how disappointed he is. Meanwhile, Grace asks Karen about her opinion on the affair, and Karen thinks that Grace is telling her that Stanley is having an affair, so Karen enlists Jack's help in spying on her husband.
64	18	"Mad Dogs and Average Men"	James Burrows	Adam Barr	March 15, 2001	63819	16.84
Will is dating a loser named Paul, and hasn't been able to break up with him because he likes his dog, Pepper, so much. Will is in the process of trying again to break up with Paul when Paul asks Will to take Pepper for the weekend while he's out of town. Will is excited to do so, but horrified when Pepper runs away. Will tries to use Pepper's disappearance to make Paul dump him, but instead, Paul wants Will's comfort. Paul suggests they go out of town for the weekend, and Will can't say no, but when he goes to pick up Paul he finds Pepper tucked away in the bedroom. It turns out Paul uses Pepper to get guys, and pulls this trick all the time. Pepper has doggie Lo-Jack, a tracking chip in his neck, and is trained to run away. Will is finally able to walk out on Paul. Grace meets Karen's very good-looking nephew, Sumner, and sparks immediately fly. When Grace tells Karen she's interested, Karen tells her Sumner is married. Grace finds out that Karen is lying, and asks her why. Karen tells Grace that she only told her that because Sumner takes advantage of women and uses them for their money... in fact, he went to jail for it once. Grace quickly finds out that this, too, is a lie. Grace is offended, and thinks that Karen has decided that Grace isn't good enough for Sumner. When Grace confronts her employee, Karen finally admits that she actually thinks Sumner isn't good enough for Grace.
65	19	"Poker? I Don't Even Like Her"	James Burrows	Jeanette Collins & Mimi Friedman	March 29, 2001	63817	16.66
Will is on the verge of kicking Grace out of his weekly poker game because his friends can't stand her playing, but she convinces him to give her one last chance. He's amazed when her game seriously improves, and she admits that she's cheating. When he is horrified, she gives him a sob story about having to win back her grandmother's turquoise jewelry, but he quickly finds out that's a lie. When he threatens to tell everyone that she's cheating, she warns him that she'll tell everyone that he was in on it. When their friend Rob later accuses Will of cheating and the two get into a violent fight over it, Grace breaks it up by admitting her wrong-doing. It turns out that the fight was just a setup to get her to confess. Karen is curious about new shoulder-enhancement surgery, but wants to see it on someone else before she goes through with it. She and Jack trick a rich cosmetic surgery-happy friend of Karen's into going through with it first. Karen is horrified when she thinks her friend died on the operating table, but is even more horrified when her friend comes out with fabulous huge shoulders and informs Karen that these were the last implants available.
66	20	"An Old-Fashioned Piano Party"	James Burrows	Jhoni Marchinko & Tracy Poust & Jon Kinnally	April 19, 2001	63820	13.97
When Grace frets that she and Will might drift apart like their similar friends, she impulsively buys an expensive piano. She not only hopes that this communal property will keep Will from ever leaving her, but she hopes that she and Will can spend time together playing it. When Will wants to go out at night and doesn't always want to stay home and play the piano with her, Grace takes it personally. She invites all of Will's friends over to have an old-fashioned piano party, but when he'd still rather go out she loses it and finally admits her fears. He comforts her with a song about how their love will keep them together, and they agree to send the piano back. Jack gets dumped by Rocco and starts writing romance novels to "work through the pain." Karen gets incredibly turned on by reading Jack's work, and is left wanting more when Jack gets back together with Rocco. Karen pays off Rocco to dump Jack again, but Jack sees through her scam and is too angry with her to write anymore. When she offers Jack himself a pay-off as well, Jack goes back to work.
67	21	"The Young and the Tactless"	James Burrows	Jeff Greenstein	April 26, 2001	63821	15.90
Karen dumps her hated mother-in-law, Sylvia, on Will and Jack, who end up taking her to a gay club opening. She advises a morose Will that if he wants to change his life, he needs to change himself, and he uncharacteristically accepts a date with a much younger guy who works at a video store. Sylvia, when she realizes that she helped a "fag" get a date, is horrified and thinks she's going to hell. Grace rants and raves at a guy in her building, Nathan, who takes her wet laundry out of the dryer to put his own in. She finds herself giving him advice on how to get his girlfriend back, but after his attempts fail he decides to go after Grace. Grace doesn't want to give him the time of day until he kisses her, and then she agrees to one date with him.
68	22	"Alice Doesn't Lisp Here Anymore"	James Burrows	Sally Bradford	May 3, 2001	63818	14.06
Grace and Will attend a funeral for a girl that Grace made fun of in school. Jack believes he has been nominated for a gay cabaret award.
69	23	"Last of the Really Odd Lovers"	James Burrows	Kari Lizer	May 10, 2001	63822	14.17
Grace hates herself for her fatal attraction to her boorish neighbor, Nathan, and keeps the relationship a secret from Will. Likewise, Will is a bit embarrassed by his dating the much younger Scott, and keeps the relationship a secret from Grace. When Karen finds out about both secrets and therefore Grace and Will realize that each has been lying to the other, the roommates agree to break up with their respective embarrassments. Will successfully sets Scott loose, but Grace can't contain herself and ends up kissing Nathan instead of dumping him. Jack loves that Val is his new number one fan, but when she starts stalking him and crawling into his bed at night he freaks out and pushes her screaming from his apartment. Later, he misses the attention again.
70	24	"Sons and Lovers"	James Burrows	David Kohan & Max Mutchnick	May 17, 2001	63823-63824	20.50
71	25	"Sons and Lovers"	James Burrows	David Kohan & Max Mutchnick	May 17, 2001	63823-63824	20.50
Will finds out Grace is still dating Nathan and is disgusted. He's even more unhappy when Nathan more or less moves in with them because Grace finds out he's been living with his ex-girlfriend. Jack finally thinks he's found his father and is excited to meet him, but is devastated to find out that the man's actually been dead for five years. Will and Nathan finally become friends when Will is touched by Nathan's sensitivity in dealing with a depressed Jack. Will keeps seeing a cute guy around the neighborhood that he calls his imaginary boyfriend but is too shy to talk to. Jack finds out that he has a son that he fathered through a sperm bank when the thirteen-year-old boy shows up wanting to meet his father. Grace realizes that things are getting serious with Nathan and worries that it might ruin her friendship with Will. She plans a trip to Morocco with Will and secretly dumps Nathan. When Will finds out that Grace ruined a potentially great relationship, he insists that she stay in town with Nathan. Luckily, Will meets his imaginary boyfriend at the airport and Grace and Nathan admit their love for one another.
