= Grace, Replaced =

- Will & Grace episode
- Scene where Will (Eric McCormack) separates the fight between Grace (Debra Messing) and Val (Molly Shannon).
- Episode no.: Season 1 Episode 18
- Directed by: James Burrows
- Written by: Katie Palmer
- Production code: 18
- Original air date: April 8, 1999

Guest appearances
- Molly Shannon as Val; Leigh-Allyn Baker as Ellen; Tom Gallop as Rob

Episode chronology
← Previous "Secrets and Lays"	Next → "Will Works Out"
- Will & Grace season 1

"Grace, Replaced" is the eighteenth episode of the first season of the American television series Will & Grace. It was written by Katie Palmer and directed by series producer James Burrows. The episode originally aired on NBC in the United States on April 8, 1999. Actors Molly Shannon, Leigh-Allyn Baker, and Tom Gallop guest starred on "Grace, Replaced".

In the episode, Grace's (Debra Messing) job forces her to work overtime, which leads to Will (Eric McCormack) feeling neglected. As a result, he seeks solace in the company of a new neighbor, Val (Shannon). Meanwhile, Jack (Sean Hayes) is annoyed that he has to perform community service for assaulting a meter maid.

Before the airing, NBC moved the program to Thursdays at 8:30 p.m., after it was a success in the Tuesday lineup. "Grace, Replaced" was the first episode to debut on the Thursday slot. Since then, the episode has generally received positive reviews from television critics. According to the Nielsen ratings system, it was watched by 19.1 million viewers, which resulted in the series attracting its highest ratings of the season.

== Plot ==
Will (Eric McCormack) feels neglected by his best friend, Grace (Debra Messing), as she spends a lot of time with her work. When Will calls Grace to confirm for a lunch date, Grace cannot go as she is too busy creating interior designs. Later, while doing his laundry, Will meets his new upstairs neighbor, Val (Molly Shannon). Immediately, the two take a liking to one another. The next day, Will visits Grace at work and introduces Val to her. After the two leave, Karen (Megan Mullally)—Grace's friend and socialite assistant—tells Grace that she did not like the way Will and Val acted towards one another. Grace, however, refuses to accept what Karen implies.

Meanwhile, after slapping a meter maid, Jack (Sean Hayes) is ordered to work 40 hours of community service, picking up garbage, and while he does this is forced to wear an orange jumpsuit. While doing community service he visits Karen at Grace Adler Designs. While there, Jack goes through a trash bag and sees Soon-Yi Allen's phone bill. Jack shows Karen the bill which quickly results in the two prank calling Soon-Yi.

At Will and Grace's apartment, Will and Val play Pyramid against Will's friends Ellen (Leigh-Allyn Baker) and Rob (Tom Gallop). Grace, who comes home, is shocked when her Pyramid record with Will—2 minutes and 14 seconds—is the same as Will and Val's. Before leaving, Grace is horrified that Will called her Val. While at her office, Grace learns that Will is sick. She goes home to attend to him and is surprised to see Val there. Grace tells her that since she is home that Val can go. Val, however, does not leave. This results in the two fighting. The fight, however, is broken by Will and tells them to work the situation out. Grace admits she felt jealous of Val as she believed Val had replaced her, due to her not being there for Will. Will, however, reassures Grace that no one can replace her as his best friend. As a result, Grace and Val make up.

== Production ==
"Grace, Replaced" was written by Katie Palmer and directed by series producer James Burrows. This was Palmer's first written episode, and was Burrows' 18th directed episode. It originally aired on NBC in the United States on April 8, 1999. Before the airing of the episode, it was confirmed that actress Molly Shannon would guest star as Val, a new neighbor in Will and Grace's apartment building. This episode would be Shannon's first appearance on the show, with her later guest starring in the episodes "Girls, Interrupted", "Last of the Really Odd Lovers", "Fagel Attraction", and "One Gay at a Time".

== Reception ==
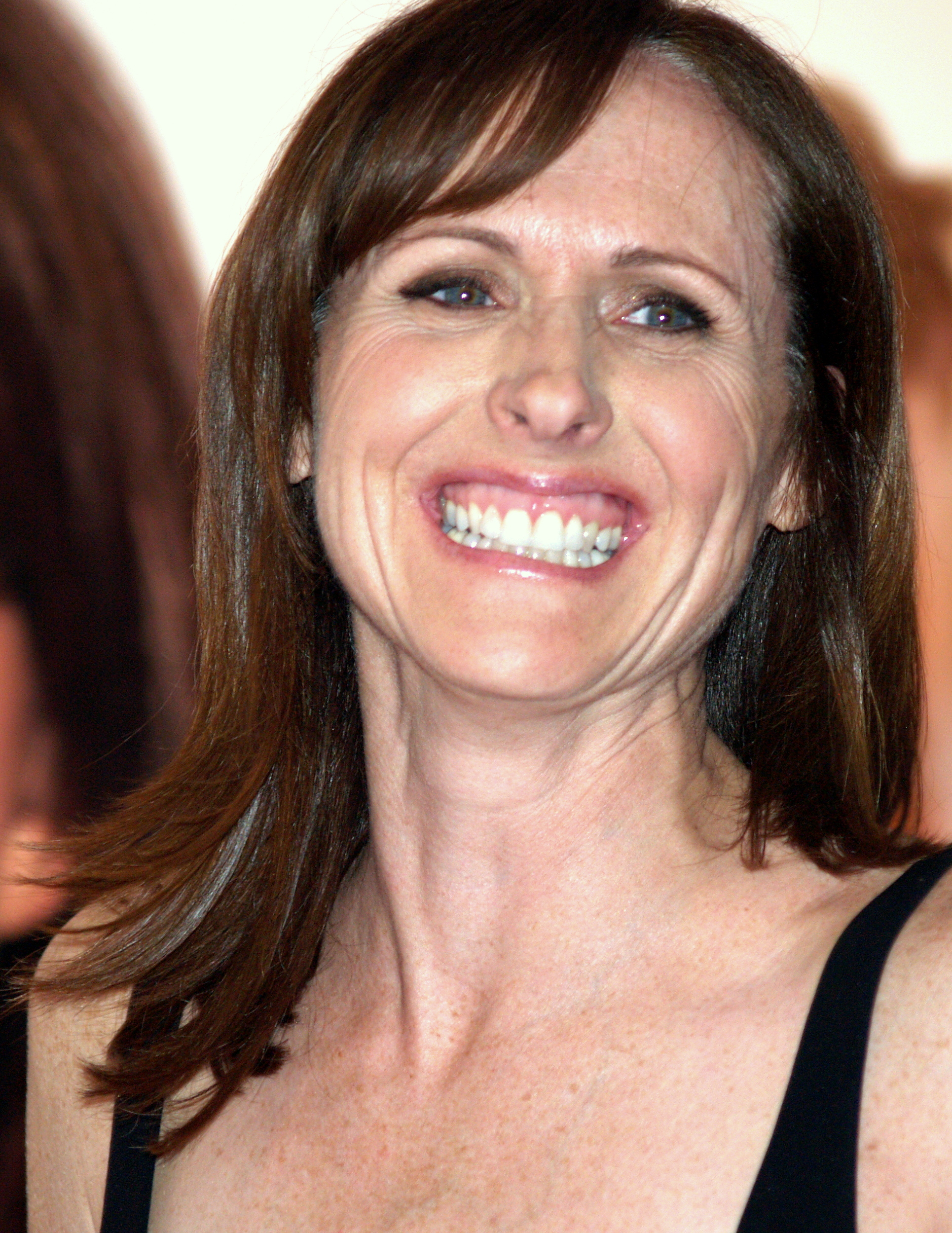
Molly Shannon guest starred in the episode. Her appearance was well received by critics.

"Grace, Replaced" brought in 19.1 million American viewers upon its original broadcast in the United States, and making it the seventh highest-rated show during the week of April 5–11, 1999. Originally, Will & Grace aired on Mondays, but due to insufficient viewership, NBC decided to move the program to Tuesdays at 9:30 p.m., which was a success as viewers tuned in. The network then changed the time slot from Tuesdays to Thursdays at 8:30 p.m., between Friends and Frasier, with this episode becoming a success as it attracted its highest audience ratings of the season. The previous episode, "Secrets and Lays", was watched by 13.3 million viewers. Many believed this decision was a good one, with a contributor of The Buffalo News commenting that the time slot change suggested that NBC felt that Will & Grace had a better chance of becoming a success than the current sitcom Jesse. In a report in The Star-Ledger it said that the decision of Will & Grace airing on Thursdays was a good benefit on behalf of NBC as the program was "the only watchable comedy".

The episode received generally positive reception. Alan Sepinwall and Matt Zoller Seitz of The Star-Ledger were complimentary towards "Grace, Replaced", writing that the episode "is a winner, packed with witty dialogue." Monica Collins of the Boston Herald said that the episode "is one of the best of the series so far". The Dallas Morning News writer Ed Bark noted that "Grace, Replaced" was "another energetic, generally amusing" episode. Bark, in regards to Jack and Karen, said that the two together "sometimes are almost more than the scenery can bear." Aaron Barnhart for The Kansas City Star called the episode riotous, and said that the show "with [its] pop-culture jokes delivered at blistering speed, outsized performances from 'supporting' players Sean Hayes and Megan Mullally, and a camaraderie between platonic pals Eric McCormack and Debra Massing that would make even Plato blush." Ted Cox of the Daily Herald was less positive about the episode, reporting that this episode "looked like more of the same", recounting the show's past story lines, and past NBC programs. Chicago Tribune's Steve Johnson opined that the episode "starts strong and then goes awry [...] It's funny for a while [...] But then it takes it to a ludicrous level, selling out its own internal logic by conspiring to put [Molly] Shannon and Messing into a ... catfight. At its best this series works a groove of pop-culture savvy; this visit from The Three Stooges by way of Dynasty will have you rolling your eyes in dismay."

Critics praised Shannon's performance in the episode. Bark wrote, "...the talented Ms. Shannon is winningly glossy and brassy [in this episode]. Someday soon she'll have her own sitcom. Bet on it." Tom Feran of The Plain Dealer reported that Shannon's appearance on the show would make "a good introduction for viewers curious about Will & Grace." The Boston Globe's Matthew Gilbert enjoyed the actress in "Grace, Replaced", writing that she is appealing as the Grace replacement.
