= Fear and Clothing =

Fear and Clothing may refer to:

- "Fear and Clothing" (My Hero), a 2005 television episode
- "Fear and Clothing" (Will & Grace), a 2000 television episode
