= Sean Hayes =

American actor (born 1970)

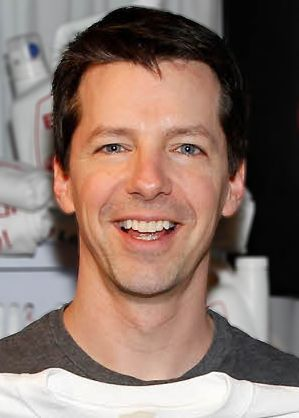
- Hayes in 2010
- Born: Sean Patrick Hayes; June 26, 1970 (age 56); Evergreen Park, Illinois, U.S.
- Education: Illinois State University
- Occupations: Actor; comedian; producer
- Years active: 1996–present
- Spouse: Scott Icenogle (m. 2014)

Sean Patrick Hayes (born June 26, 1970) is an American actor, comedian, and producer. Known for his performances on stage and screen, he gained acclaim for his role as Jack McFarland on the NBC sitcom Will & Grace, for which he won a Primetime Emmy Award and four Actor Awards, in addition to nominations for six Golden Globe Awards.

On stage, he made his Broadway debut in the musical revival Promises, Promises (2010) for which he was nominated for the Tony Award for Best Leading Actor in a Musical. He portrayed Oscar Levant in the Doug Wright play Good Night, Oscar for which he won the Tony Award for Best Actor in a Play in 2023. He reprised the role on the West End for which he won the Laurence Olivier Award for Outstanding Musical Contribution in 2026. He hosted the 64th Tony Awards in 2010 for which he was awarded a Primetime Emmy Award.

Hayes is also known for his work in film. He portrayed Jerry Lewis in the CBS film Martin and Lewis (2002). He is known for his appearances in films such as Billy's Hollywood Screen Kiss (1998), Cats & Dogs (2001), Pieces of April (2003), The Cat in the Hat (2003), Win a Date with Tad Hamilton! (2004), The Bucket List (2007), Igor (2008), The Three Stooges (2012), Monsters University (2013), and Am I OK? (2022).

He also runs a television production company called Hazy Mills Productions, which produces shows such as Grimm, Hot in Cleveland, The Soul Man, and Hollywood Game Night. Since July 2020, he has co-hosted the comedy podcast SmartLess alongside Jason Bateman and Will Arnett.

== Early life ==
Hayes was born in Evergreen Park, Illinois, the youngest child of five of Mary Hayes (1939–2018), the director of a non-profit food bank called the Northern Illinois Food Bank, and Ronald Hayes, a lithographer. He is of Irish descent and was raised as a Roman Catholic in the Chicago suburb of Glen Ellyn, Illinois. His father, an alcoholic, left the family when Hayes was five, leaving his mother to raise him and his siblings. He has been estranged from his father for many years.

After graduating from Glenbard West High School, Hayes attended Illinois State University, where he studied piano performance. He left "two or three classes short" of graduation when he became music director at the Pheasant Run Theater in St. Charles, Illinois. Hayes worked as a classical pianist. He practiced improv at The Second City in Chicago. He also composed original music for a production of Antigone at the Steppenwolf Theatre Company in Chicago. He moved to Los Angeles in 1995, where he found work as a comedian and an actor on stage and on television, including a commercial for Doritos which aired during Super Bowl XXXII in 1998.

== Career ==
=== Early career ===
As a teenager, Hayes was an extra in the film Lucas (1986), which was filmed at his high school. He made his professional debut in the independent film Billy's Hollywood Screen Kiss (1998), which brought him wide attention.

=== Will and Grace ===
The same year, he was cast as Jack McFarland, a flamboyantly gay and frequently unemployed actor, in the NBC comedy series Will & Grace. The show became a long-running hit and Hayes' performance earned him seven consecutive Emmy Award nominations as Outstanding Supporting Actor in a Comedy Series. He won the award for his first nomination. He was also nominated for six Golden Globe Awards for his performances.

=== Film ===
Hayes also made film appearances as the voice of the villainous white Persian cat Mr. Tinkles in Cats & Dogs (2001), as Jerry Lewis in Martin and Lewis (2002), Wayne in Pieces of April (2003) and Win a Date with Tad Hamilton! (2004). He was also the voice of Brain in the 2008 film Igor, and has guest-starred in television shows such as Scrubs and 30 Rock. In 2005, he was executive producer for Bravo's Situation: Comedy, a reality television series about sitcoms. He also executive produced The Sperm Donor and Stephen's Life, the two winning scripts that were chosen by NBC. He guest-starred in 2006 in the Adult Swim cameo-filled show Tom Goes to the Mayor (S2E15, "Bass Fest"). Hayes appeared as Thomas in the film The Bucket List (2007). On July 5, 2008, he made his New York stage debut as Mr. Applegate / Devil in New York City Center's Encores! production of Damn Yankees.

He also appeared as Mr. Hank Humberfloob and provided the voice of "The Fish" in The Cat in the Hat. In 2010, he reprised the role of Mr. Tinkles in Cats & Dogs: The Revenge of Kitty Galore.

He played Larry Fine in the film The Three Stooges (2012).

In 2017, Hayes played the role of Steven, the devil emoji in The Emoji Movie.

=== Broadway ===
He made his Broadway debut in the April 2010 Broadway revival of the musical Promises, Promises. He received a nomination for the Drama League Award for Distinguished Performance, and was nominated for a Tony Award for Best Actor in a Musical.

Hayes was host of the 64th Annual Tony Awards on June 13, 2010, on CBS.

Hayes starred in the Broadway production An Act of God, June 6 to September 4, 2016, after engagements in Los Angeles and San Francisco.

In 2022, Hayes portrayed pianist Oscar Levant in the play by Doug Wright entitled Good Night, Oscar which premiered at the Goodman Theatre in Chicago. He reprised the role on Broadway at the Belasco Theatre, beginning in April 2023. He received rave reviews for his performance earning a Tony Award for Best Actor in a Play. He also received the Drama Desk Award for Outstanding Lead Performance in a Play. In February 2025, it was announced that Hayes would make his debut on the West End reprising this role in a production at the Barbican Theatre in the summer of 2025.

Hayes currently starts in the one-man play The Unknown, Off-Broadway at Studio Seaview, having begun previews on January 31, 2026, with the run slated to end on April 12, 2026.

=== Other television work ===
On November 15, 2010, he appeared in a satirical PSA for the repeal of Don't Ask, Don't Tell on The Daily Show with Jon Stewart. In a 2008 interview in The New York Times, Hayes talked about a television project, BiCoastal, about "a guy with a wife and kids in California and a boyfriend in New York" for Showtime. He was the host of An All Star Tribute to James Burrows. Hayes has also guest starred as Buddy Wood on the NBC sitcom Parks and Recreation. Hayes starred in and was one of the executive producers for the Netflix series Q-Force, released September 2, 2021.

=== Producing and production company ===
Aware that his role in Will & Grace "wouldn't go on forever," Hayes teamed up with friend Todd Milliner, whom he met at Illinois State University, to create the television production company Hazy Mills Productions in 2004. Hayes was co-executive producer of the TV Land original comedy series Hot in Cleveland, which premiered in June 2010 and ran for six seasons. He was also a co-executive producer of the NBC series Grimm, as well as creator and executive producer on another NBC series, Hollywood Game Night. Other television series produced by the company include The Soul Man and Sean Saves the World.

=== Ventures with his husband ===
Hayes and his husband, Scott Icenogle, produce lip-sync videos under their YouTube channel, The Kitchen Sync. They lip-synced to songs such as "Trouble" and "Burnitup!" Hayes always had an interest in The Nutcracker and memorized the whole musical piece. Given his interest, Hayes went on to write a prequel to the holiday play with his husband.

=== Podcasting ===
In July 2020, Hayes, along with Will Arnett and Jason Bateman, created a comedy and talk podcast called SmartLess. He also hosts another podcast with Priyanka Wali called HypochondriActor.

== Personal life ==
Hayes refused to discuss his sexual orientation for many years, saying he believed that audiences would therefore be more open-minded about his characters. Nevertheless, after the success of Will & Grace, he was frustrated to find himself typecast, only receiving offers for gay roles. To avoid questions about his sexuality, he declined interview offers from gay publications during the run of the show. In response to a satirical piece run in The Advocate, which criticized him for being opaque about his sexual orientation, he appeared to imply that he is gay, stating: "Really? You're gonna shoot the gay guy down? I never have had a problem saying who I am. I am who I am." He also indicated that he was in a relationship. He feels he has "contributed monumentally to the success of the gay movement in America, and if anyone wants to argue that, I'm open to it." After he received Outfest's Trailblazer Award in 2016 he addressed this criticism in his speech, saying in part: "Looking back at my choice to stay silent, I am ashamed and embarrassed. What was I thinking? [...] I know I should've come out sooner, and I'm sorry for that, especially when I think about the possibility that I might have made a difference in someone's life."

He received an honorary PhD from Illinois State University in February 2013. In November 2014, Hayes announced that he had married his partner of eight years, Scott Icenogle. In October 2017, while appearing on an episode of The Ellen DeGeneres Show, Hayes revealed that he had been hospitalized with a rare condition in which his small intestine burst. The intestine was repaired.

Hayes has been open about living with atrial fibrillation, a cardiac disorder that causes him to frequently visit the ER to get his heart shocked back into sinus rhythm whenever his heartbeat is too irregular or rapid. About his condition, Hayes has said, "When I go to the ER, I'm like Norm from 'Cheers.' They're like, 'Sean!', because I'm in there all the time."

== Acting credits ==
=== Film ===
Year	Title	Role	Notes
1996	A&P	Sammy	Short film
1998	Billy's Hollywood Screen Kiss	Billy Collier	
2000	Buzz Lightyear of Star Command: The Adventure Begins	Brain Pod No. 13	Voice
2001	Cats & Dogs	Mr. Tinkles	Voice
2003	Pieces of April	Wayne	
2003	The Cat in the Hat	Mr. Hank Humberfloob / Voice of the Fish	
2004	Win a Date with Tad Hamilton!	Richard Levy the Shameless	
2005	Roberto the Insect Architect	Narrator	
2007	The Bucket List	Matthew	
2008	Soul Men	Danny Epstein	
2008	Igor	Brain	Voice
2010	Cats & Dogs: The Revenge of Kitty Galore	Mr. Tinkles	Voice
2012	The Three Stooges	Larry Fine	
2012	Hit and Run	Sandy Osterman	
2013	Monsters University	Terri Perry	Voice
2017	The Emoji Movie	Steven the Devil	Voice
2020	Lazy Susan	Susan O'Connell	
2022	Am I OK?	Stu	
2025	Is This Thing On?	Stephen	
2025	The Running Man	Gary Greenbacks	

=== Television ===
Year	Title	Role	Notes
1996	Silk Stalkings	Roger	Episode: "Services Rendered"
1998–2006, 2017–2020	Will & Grace	Jack McFarland	246 episodes
2001	Rugrats	Talent Show Director	Voice, episode: "And the Winner Is.../Dil's Bathtime/Bigger Than Life"
2001	Scrubs	Nick Murdoch	Episode: "My Super Ego"
2001	Saturday Night Live	Himself/host	Episode: "Sean Hayes/Shaggy"
2002	Martin and Lewis	Jerry Lewis	Television film
2006	Tom Goes to the Mayor	Tour Guide	Episode: "Bass Fest"
2006	Lovespring International	Victor	Episode: "A Rear Window"
2006	Will & Grace: Say Goodnight Gracie	Jack McFarland	Television film
2006–2007	Campus Ladies	Marshall	2 episodes
2007	30 Rock	Jesse Parcell	Episode: "Hiatus"
2008	Man Stroke Woman	Various	Television film
2010	64th Tony Awards	Host	Television special
2010–2015	Hot in Cleveland	Chad	Episode: "One Thing or a Mother"; Also executive producer; 124 episodes
2011–2017	Grimm		Executive producer; 108 episodes
2012–2016	The Soul Man		Executive producer; 11 episodes
2012	Portlandia	Sean	Episode: "Cops Redesign"
2012	Parks and Recreation	Buddy Wood	Episode: "Lucky"
2012	Up All Night	Walter	4 episodes
2013	Smash	Terrence Falls	3 episodes
2013	American Dad!	Foster	Voice, episode: "Lost in Space"
2013–2014	Sean Saves the World	Sean Harrison	15 episodes Also executive producer
2013–2020	Hollywood Game Night	Himself	2 episodes Also creator, executive producer; 6 episodes
2014–2015	The Millers	Kip Finkle	11 episodes
2014	The Comeback	Himself	Episode: "Valerie Gets What She Really Wants"
2014	How Murray Saved Christmas	Edison Elf	Voice, television special
2015	The Late Late Show	Himself/Guest Host	3 episodes
2016	Crowded		Executive producer; 13 episodes
2016	Maya & Marty	Himself/various	2 episodes
2016	An All Star Tribute to James Burrows	Himself/host	Television special Also executive producer
2016	Hairspray Live!	Mr. Pinky	Television special
2017–2020	Tangled: The Series	Pete the Guard	Voice, 21 episodes
2019	Live in Front of a Studio Audience	Mr. Frank Lorenzo	Episode: "Norman Lear's All in the Family and The Jeffersons"
2020, 2022	Jimmy Kimmel Live!	Himself/host	6 episodes
2021	Q-Force	Steve Maryweather	Voice, main role
2022	Murderville	Santa Claus	Episode: "Who Killed Santa? A Murderville Murder Mystery"
2022	Lego Masters	Himself	Episode: "Start Your Engines"
2024	Curb Your Enthusiasm	Christopher Mantle	Episodes: "Fish Stuck" and "The Colostomy Bag"
2026	Life, Larry and the Pursuit of Unhappiness	Orville Wright	Episode: "McCarthy"
2027	The Morning Show	Wyatt Hartman	Recurring role

=== Theatre ===
Year	Title	Role	Notes	Ref.
2008	Damn Yankees	Applegate	New York City Center, Encores!	
2010–2011	Promises, Promises	Chuck Baxter	Broadway Theatre, Broadway	
2015	An Act of God	God	US Tour	
2016	An Act of God	God	Booth Theatre, Broadway	
2022	Good Night, Oscar	Oscar Levant	Goodman Theatre, Chicago	
2023	Good Night, Oscar	Oscar Levant	Belasco Theatre, Broadway	
2025	Good Night, Oscar	Oscar Levant	Barbican Theatre, London	
2026	The Unknown	Elliott	Studio Seaview, Off-Broadway	

== Awards and nominations ==
Year	Award	Category	Production	Result	Ref.
2000	Primetime Emmy Award	Outstanding Supporting Actor in a Comedy Series	Will & Grace (episode: "Homo for the Holidays" + "Acting Out")	Won	
2001	Primetime Emmy Award	Outstanding Supporting Actor in a Comedy Series	Will & Grace (episode: "Gypsies, Tramp and Weed" + "Grace 0, Jack 2000")	Nominated	
2002	Primetime Emmy Award	Outstanding Supporting Actor in a Comedy Series	Will & Grace (episode: "A Chorus Line" + "Went to a Garden Potty")	Nominated	
2003	Primetime Emmy Award	Outstanding Supporting Actor in a Comedy Series	Will & Grace (episode: "Bacon & Eggs" + "Sex, Losers, and Videotape")	Nominated	
2004	Primetime Emmy Award	Outstanding Supporting Actor in a Comedy Series	Will & Grace (episode: "Me & Mr. Jones" + "I Never Cheered for my Father")	Nominated	
2005	Primetime Emmy Award	Outstanding Supporting Actor in a Comedy Series	Will & Grace (episode: "Queens for a Day" + "It's a Dad, Dad, Dad, Dad World")	Nominated	
2006	Primetime Emmy Award	Outstanding Supporting Actor in a Comedy Series	Will & Grace (episode: "Alive and Schticking" + "I Love L. Gay")	Nominated	
2011	Primetime Emmy Award	Outstanding Special Class Program	64th Tony Awards	Won	
1999	Golden Globe Award	Best Supporting Actor – Television	Will & Grace (season 1)	Nominated	
2000	Golden Globe Award	Best Supporting Actor – Television	Will & Grace (season 2)	Nominated	
2001	Golden Globe Award	Best Supporting Actor – Television	Will & Grace (season 3)	Nominated	
2002	Golden Globe Award	Best Supporting Actor – Television	Will & Grace (season 4)	Nominated	
2003	Golden Globe Award	Best Supporting Actor – Television	Will & Grace (season 5)	Nominated	
2004	Golden Globe Award	Best Supporting Actor – Television	Will & Grace (season 6)	Nominated	
2026	Golden Globe Award	Best Podcast	SmartLess	Nominated	
2000	Screen Actors Guild Awards	Outstanding Ensemble in a Comedy Series	Will & Grace	Won	
2000	Screen Actors Guild Awards	Outstanding Male Actor in a Comedy Series	Will & Grace	Nominated	
2001	Screen Actors Guild Awards	Outstanding Ensemble in a Comedy Series	Will & Grace	Nominated	
2001	Screen Actors Guild Awards	Outstanding Male Actor in a Comedy Series	Will & Grace	Won	
2002	Screen Actors Guild Awards	Outstanding Ensemble in a Comedy Series	Will & Grace	Nominated	
2002	Screen Actors Guild Awards	Outstanding Male Actor in a Comedy Series	Will & Grace	Won	
2002	Screen Actors Guild Awards	Outstanding Male Actor in a Limited Series or Movie	Martin and Lewis	Nominated	
2003	Screen Actors Guild Awards	Outstanding Ensemble in a Comedy Series	Will & Grace	Nominated	
2003	Screen Actors Guild Awards	Outstanding Male Actor in a Comedy Series	Will & Grace	Nominated	
2004	Screen Actors Guild Awards	Outstanding Ensemble in a Comedy Series	Will & Grace	Nominated	
2004	Screen Actors Guild Awards	Outstanding Male Actor in a Comedy Series	Will & Grace	Nominated	
2005	Screen Actors Guild Awards	Outstanding Male Actor in a Comedy Series	Will & Grace	Won	
2017	Screen Actors Guild Awards	Outstanding Male Actor in a Comedy Series	Will & Grace	Nominated	
2010	Tony Award	Best Leading Actor in a Musical	Promises, Promises	Nominated	
2023	Tony Award	Best Leading Actor in a Play	Good Night, Oscar	Won	
2010	Audie Awards	Audiobook of the Year	Nelson Mandela's Favorite African Folktales	Won	
2010	Audie Awards	Multi-Voiced Performance	Nelson Mandela's Favorite African Folktales	Won	
2022	Jeff Award	Performer in a Principal Role in a Play	Good Night, Oscar	Won	
2023	Drama Desk Award	Outstanding Lead Performance in a Play	Good Night, Oscar	Won	
2023	Drama League Award	Distinguished Performance Award	Good Night, Oscar	Nominated	
2026	Drama League Award	Distinguished Performance Award	The Unknown	Nominated	
2011	Outer Critics Circle Awards	Outstanding Actor in a Musical	Promises, Promises	Nominated	
2023	Outer Critics Circle Awards	Outstanding Lead Performer in a Broadway Play	Good Night, Oscar	Won	
2026	Outer Critics Circle Awards	Outstanding Solo Performance	The Unknown	Nominated	
2026	Laurence Olivier Awards	Best Actor	Good Night, Oscar	Nominated	
2026	Laurence Olivier Awards	Outstanding Musical Contribution	Good Night, Oscar	Won	
2026	Critics' Circle Theatre Awards	Best Actor	Good Night, Oscar	Nominated	
