= Rosario Salazar =

Fictional character

- Will & Grace character
- First appearance: "Object of My Rejection" (episode 1.22)
- Last appearance: "#VoteHoney" (One off special)
- Created by: Adam Barr
- Portrayed by: Shelley Morrison

In-universe information
- Nicknames: Rosie, Ro-Ro, Mami
- Gender: Female
- Occupation: Maid (for Karen Walker); Teacher; Various other demeaning jobs
- Family: Unnamed brother (brother; incarcerated)
- Spouses: Jack McFarland (m. 1998; div. 1999)
- Children: Elliot (former stepson, via Jack); Possible other children (estranged)

Rosario Inés Consuelo Yolanda Salazar (previously McFarland; also known as "Rosie" and "Ro-Ro") is a fictional character on the American television sitcom Will & Grace, portrayed by actress Shelley Morrison. Originally due to appear just once, the character was so popular with audiences that the show's writers made her a semi-regular character.

== Fictional character history ==
=== Early life ===
A native of El Salvador, Rosario was a school teacher, who received a bachelor's degree in clinical psychology from the University of Texas and who almost got a master's degree (three credits short); she also attended business school. At some point, she moved to The Bronx, presumably while studying business. However, Karen states that she bought Rosario from Rosario's parents, and another comment made by Jack states that Karen smuggles staff in from Latin America, namely Mexico, and probably El Salvador as well. While there, she also performed with a then-unknown Jennifer Lopez, including a production of "Tea for Two" at the Shalom Retirement Center. At some point, she was also paid to tape pornographic videos for Tommy Lee. One of Rosario's brothers is a political prisoner, and remarks made by Karen suggests she has children, possibly still in El Salvador.

=== Series overview ===
Although she had been mentioned by Karen since the pilot episode, Rosario's first appearance was in the season-one finale, "Object of My Rejection." Due to Karen's patronizing tone, we're made to think she doesn't speak English well. Rosario actually speaks English fluently albeit with a thick accent, but is an undocumented immigrant.

To keep her in the country, Karen has her marry Jack McFarland, her gay friend, to get her green card. The marriage was later terminated at the end of season two, when Rosario asked for a divorce to pursue other romantic interests. However, she maintained a close relationship with Jack after (often echoing hers with Karen) and claimed to still think of him as family. Rosario was one of few people with whom Stan remained in contact after he faked his death (at the end of season five). When Karen learned that Rosario had kept this news from her (in season eight), she fired her. Rosario worked as a bar attendant until Karen took her back. During a live episode, it is revealed by Karen that Rosario earns $350,000 per year.

In the show's series finale, Rosario was shown to have lived with Karen and Jack in the years after the show ended, growing older with them and possibly still working for them despite being in a wheelchair (though she states that she is only in the wheelchair due to a sprained ankle). Rosario is usually seen wearing a Members Only jacket over her maid's uniform. She has a particular fondness for Subway sandwiches. Morrison was a guest star in the first two seasons, but from season three until the eighth season, she was credited as a main cast member in the episodes she appeared.

=== Series revival ===
In the series revival in 2017, Rosario is an unseen character, referred to but never appearing. Morrison had declined to reprise her role, having retired from acting. The character was written out of the show in the episode "Rosario's Quinceañera", in which Rosario dies of a heart attack off screen.

=== Relationship with Karen Walker ===
In 1985, Rosario met Karen Walker at a club, while working as a cigarette lady, and went to work for her as a maid, which was where she was working when the series began in 1998. Rosario and Karen are very close, but their relationship is love-hate. They are notorious for swapping insults back and forth. Rosario is just as feisty as Karen, and is one of the few people that can go toe-to-toe with her.

In earlier episodes, they often yell and argue with each other at the same time. However, many of those fights end with an emotional embrace or light-hearted exchange between the two, which makes it clear that they really do care about each other. Examples of this include the season 3 episode "My Uncle, The Car," where Karen becomes sad at almost losing Rosario in a bet to her rival Beverley Leslie, and the season 7 episode "Partners," where Karen ignores the plight of a very sick Rosario because she is afraid of losing her. Rosario also mentions in season 4's "The Third Wheel Gets The Grace" that, for their 15-year anniversary, all she wanted to do was spend time with Karen.

When Rosario dies in the series revival, Karen arranges the funeral, giving Rosario the quinceañera she never had. She bolts out of the funeral before it starts, however, drowning her sorrows at a bar, unable to handle the loss of her friend. She later comes back to the church to sit next to the casket and say goodbye, admitting with rare emotion that Rosario was her best friend, her "sparring partner", and her "everything".
