= Shelley Morrison =

American actress (1936–2019)

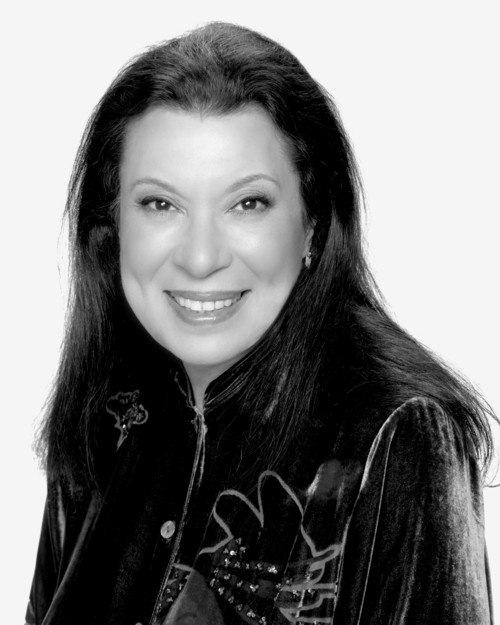
- Born: Rachel Mitrani; October 26, 1936; New York City, New York, U.S.
- Died: December 1, 2019 (aged 83); Los Angeles, California, U.S.
- Other name: Rachel Dominguez
- Occupation: Actress
- Years active: 1961–2016
- Spouse: Walter Dominguez (m. 1973)
- Children: 6
- Website: shelleymorrison.com

Shelley Morrison (born Rachel Mitrani; October 26, 1936 – December 1, 2019) was an American actress. Morrison was known for her role as maid Rosario Salazar in the NBC comedy Will & Grace, which she played from 1999 to 2006. She was also a regular performer on the sitcom The Flying Nun, playing Sister Sixto, a nun known mostly for mangling the English language, and she had a recurring role in the soap opera General Hospital in 1982. She was also the voice of Mrs. Portillo in the animated Disney show Handy Manny.

== Early life ==
Morrison was born Rachel Mitrani in the South Bronx, New York City, the only daughter of Hortense, a homemaker, and Maurice Mitrani, a clothing manufacturer. Her parents were both Spanish-speaking Sephardic Jews who immigrated to the United States from Spain. Spanish was Morrison's first language. She was raised in the Bronx before moving to Los Angeles, California when she was 10 years old. She studied journalism at the University of Southern California, after which she studied acting at Los Angeles City College.

== Career ==
Soon after her time at Los Angeles City College Morrison began acting in summer stock theater at the Tustin Playbox, portraying Mrs. Potts in Picnic (1956).

In 1961 Morrison and actor Tom Sheldon (or Selden) formed the New Playwright Company. Their first production, Cotton Candy, opened at the Vine Street Playhouse on July 11, 1961.

Morrison landed early film roles in Divorce American Style and How to Save a Marriage and Ruin Your Life.

From 1965 to 1967, she appeared four times as an American Indian, Linda Little Trees, in the television series Laredo (in the episodes "Yahoo", "Jinx", "No Bugles, One Drum", and "Split the Difference.") In 1966 she played “Addie Moonercan” in the episode “Which Doctor” of Gunsmoke. In 1967, she played the Puerto Rican nun Sister Sixto, who had trouble with English, in Sally Field's show The Flying Nun. She played this role until the show was cancelled in 1970. Morrison also appeared in the 1997 romantic comedy film Fools Rush In, starring Salma Hayek and Matthew Perry, as well as more dramatic films such as Blume in Love and Breezy (both 1973).

One of Morrison's notable roles was as the Salvadoran maid Rosario Inés Consuelo Yolanda Salazar on the sitcom Will & Grace. She appeared in 64 episodes from 1999 to 2006 (as well as a brief cameo on the September 2016 Will & Grace webisode in support of Hillary Clinton's presidential campaign). The role originally was created for a brief one-episode appearance, but Rosario was so popular with viewers that she became a recurring character. In addition to sparring with her libertine and very spoiled employer Karen Walker (Megan Mullally), Rosario married Karen's gay friend Jack McFarland (Sean Hayes) to prevent her deportation.

Among approximately 25 film appearances and 200 television appearances, Morrison portrayed a maid or housekeeper on 32 separate occasions. Morrison had just informed her agent not to offer her any more "maid parts" when the call came for Will & Grace. In 2017, NBC revived Will & Grace for a new series of episodes. On August 3, 2017, co-creator Max Mutchnick announced to reporters that Morrison had been asked to reprise her role as Salazar on the show, but that she ultimately decided to retire completely from acting. Although her last official acting role was a voiceover in the 2012 animated film Foodfight!, her final appearance as an actress was the 2016 election-themed webisode of Will & Grace.

== Personal life ==
In June 2003 Morrison pleaded no contest to a misdemeanor charge of shoplifting jewelry valued at almost $450. The case resulted from her arrest on April 23, 2003, after security guards at a Robinsons-May department store in Los Angeles found her with the jewelry. Her sentence was a fine of $300 and one year of probation. Her attorney said, "I think Ms. Morrison has certainly learned from this experience. She will never find herself in this situation again."

Morrison was married to author Walter Dominguez, whom she met in 1973. They adopted six children.

== Death ==
Morrison died at Cedars-Sinai Medical Center in Los Angeles on December 1, 2019, as a result of heart failure after a brief illness. She was 83 years old.

== Filmography ==
Year	Title	Role	Notes
1962	The Interns	Party Girl	Uncredited
1966	Castle of Evil	Lupe Tekal d'Esperanza	
1967	Divorce American Style	Jackie	
1968	How to Save a Marriage and Ruin Your Life	Marcia Borie	
1968	Laredo	Linda Little Trees	Four episodes
1968	Funny Girl	Second Floor Woman	Uncredited
1969	Mackenna's Gold	The Pima Squaw	
1971	Man and Boy	Rosita	
1972	Stand Up and Be Counted	Rosa	Uncredited
1973	Blume in Love	Mrs. Greco	
1973	Breezy	Nancy Henderson	
1974	People Toys	Ruth	
1978	Rabbit Test	Mrs. Borzoni	
1983	Max Dugan Returns	Mother	
1989	Troop Beverly Hills	Rosa the Maid	
1997	Fools Rush In	Aunt Carmen	
2004	Shark Tale	Mrs. Sanchez	Voice
2011	Foodfight!	Lola Frutola	Voice
