= Adam Barr =

American screenwriter and television producer

Adam Barr is a television screenwriter and producer best known for his comedy credits including the hit NBC series Will & Grace.

In the early nineties he teamed up with best friend Peter Ocko, with whom he wrote 12 episodes of Parker Lewis Can't Lose. Later in the decade the writing duo scripted ten episodes of Weird Science, the series spun off the 1985 sci-fi comedy film of the same name.

Perhaps Barr's most notable work was on Will & Grace, the long-running situation comedy about a gay man and his best friend, which first aired in the US from 1998 to 2006. Barr wrote 18 episodes of the sitcom and had a hand in the production of 70 (variously as Consulting Producer, Supervising Producer or Co-Executive Producer).

Barr also guest-starred once in the show: he played the role of Guy in 'Last Of The Really Odd Lovers', episode 23 of season three.

Barr also wrote and directed a short film, Mackenheim, which was produced by Billy Pollina in 2002.

Most recently, he was involved in the writing of a screenplay for the American adaptation of the Icelandic comedy series Næturvaktin ("The Night Shift"). He now lives in California with wife and daughter. He graduated from Harvard College.
