= Alex Herschlag =

American screenwriter

- Born: New York, New York, U.S.
- Occupations: Television producer, writer and stand-up comedian
- Years active: 1987–present
- Spouse: Apryl Huntzinger

Alex Herschlag is an American television producer, writer and stand-up comedian. He is best known for his work on the sitcom Will & Grace for which he won a Primetime Emmy Award in 2000, as a part of the producing and writing team. He was nominated five more times, until he left the series after the seventh season. He returned to the show for the 2017 (season 9) return.

== Life and career ==
Herschlag was born in the New York City borough of The Bronx, and grew up in Spring Valley. He moved to Montreal to attend McGill University where he majored in Psychology. He began performing stand-up comedy in Montreal and continued doing so when he moved to San Francisco after graduating college. While living in San Francisco, he began writing comedy material for various sketch comedy groups.

He then moved to Los Angeles, where he began and performing with a comedy group featuring a then-unknown Molly Shannon. After a number of career disappointments, Herschlag began writing material for various stand-up comedians. He met Ellen DeGeneres, through this experience, who hired him as a producer and writer on her self-titled 1990s sitcom from 1995 to 1997.

Herschlag's other television credits include Costello, Teachers, Andy Barker, P.I., Sit Down, Shut Up, Modern Family, 100 Questions and Hot in Cleveland. He has also been credited as a writer for the Primetime Emmys, the Grammy Awards and the Academy Awards.

== Personal life ==
Herschlag currently resides in Los Angeles with his wife, Apryl Huntzinger, who was a writer on The Drew Carey Show.

== Television ==
Year (s)	Television Program	Title
1996–1997	Ellen	Co-producer
1998	Costello	Co-executive producer
1999–2005; 2017–2019	Will & Grace	Executive producer, writer
2006	Teachers	Co-executive producer
2006–2007	Sons & Daughters	Consulting producer
2007	Andy Barker, P.I.	Consulting producer, writer
2009	Sit Down, Shut Up	Co-executive producer, writer
2010	Modern Family	Consulting producer, writer
2010	100 Questions	Consulting producer
2011–2015	Hot in Cleveland	Executive producer, consulting producer, writer
2016	Mike & Molly	Consulting producer, writer
2016–2017	Man with a Plan	Consulting producer, writer
2017	I'm Dying Up Here	Writer
2020	Broke	Creator, executive producer, writer
