= Jhoni Marchinko =

American screenwriter

Jhoni Marchinko is an American screenwriter who has worked on several television shows, including Will & Grace and Murphy Brown.

== Career ==
She started out, writing material for Dennis Miller, and later Louie Anderson. She worked as a writer and story editor on Ink. She worked on 2 Broke Girls as a writer and consulting producer. In 2020, she worked on AJ and the Queen as a writer and executive producer, with RuPaul starring. On March 6, 2020, Netflix announced that the series had been cancelled.
