= Tracy Poust =

American television producer and writer

Tracy Poust is a producer and writer known for her work on the American television sitcom Will & Grace (1998–2006, 2017–2020) and the ABC show Ugly Betty (2006–2010).
