= List of awards and nominations received by Will & Grace =

Awards and nominations received by Will & Grace
Awards and nominations
| Award | Won | Nominated |
| Emmy Awards | 18 | 96 |
| Directors Guild of America Awards | 1 | 6 |
| Golden Globe Awards | 0 | 30 |
| Producers Guild of America Awards | 0 | 5 |
| Satellite Awards | 2 | 9 |
| Screen Actors Guild Awards | 7 | 13 |
| Television Critics Association Awards | 0 | 8 |
| Writers Guild of America Awards | 1 | 2 |
- Total number of wins and nominations
| Totals | 51 | 206 |
- Footnotes

Will & Grace is an American sitcom created by Max Mutchnick and David Kohan about the relationship between best friends Will Truman (Eric McCormack), a gay lawyer, and Grace Adler (Debra Messing), a straight interior designer. It was broadcast on NBC from September 21, 1998 to May 18, 2006, for a total of eight seasons. During its original run, Will & Grace was one of the most successful television series with gay principal characters. It was revived by NBC in 2017 for a ninth and tenth season.

Despite initial criticism for its particular portrayal of homosexual characters, it has been met with continued critical acclaim and won several major awards, including 18 Primetime Emmy Awards and seven Screen Actors Guild Awards. Additionally, the show received 30 Golden Globe Award nominations (but no wins).

== Major awards ==
=== Primetime Emmy Awards ===
The Primetime Emmy Award is an American award bestowed by the Academy of Television Arts & Sciences in recognition of excellence in American primetime television programming. Will & Grace has received 18 awards from 96 nominations, including an award for each main cast member. In addition to this, there have been three times when all four main actors were nominated for their respective category in the same year: 2000, 2001 and 2003.

| Year | Category | Nominee | Result | Ref |
|---|---|---|---|---|
| 1999 | Outstanding Directing for a Comedy Series | James Burrows (for "Pilot") | Nominated | |
| 2000 | Outstanding Comedy Series | | Won | |
| 2000 | Outstanding Lead Actor in a Comedy Series | Eric McCormack (for "Oh Dad, Poor Dad, He's Kept Me in the Closet and I'm So Sad") | Nominated | |
| 2000 | Outstanding Lead Actress in a Comedy Series | Debra Messing (for "Das Boob") | Nominated | |
| 2000 | Outstanding Supporting Actor in a Comedy Series | Sean Hayes (for "Homo for the Holidays" and "Acting Out") | Won | |
| 2000 | Outstanding Supporting Actress in a Comedy Series | Megan Mullally (for "To Serve and Disinfect" and "Polk Defeats Truman") | Won | |
| 2000 | Outstanding Art Direction for a Multi-Camera Series | Glenda Rovello and Melinda Ritz (for "Ben? Her?") | Nominated | |
| 2000 | Outstanding Casting for a Comedy Series | Tracy Lilienfield | Nominated | |
| 2000 | Outstanding Cinematography for a Multi-Camera Series | Tony Askins (for "Acting Out") | Nominated | |
| 2000 | Outstanding Directing for a Comedy Series | James Burrows (for "Homo for the Holidays") | Nominated | |
| 2000 | Outstanding Guest Actress in a Comedy Series | Debbie Reynolds | Nominated | |
| 2000 | Outstanding Multi-Camera Picture Editing for a Series | Peter Chakos (for "Ben? Her?") | Nominated | |
| 2001 | Outstanding Comedy Series | | Nominated | |
| 2001 | Outstanding Lead Actor in a Comedy Series | Eric McCormack (for "Lows in the Mid Eighties") | Won | |
| 2001 | Outstanding Lead Actress in a Comedy Series | Debra Messing (for "Lows in the Mid Eighties") | Nominated | |
| 2001 | Outstanding Supporting Actor in a Comedy Series | Sean Hayes (for "Gypsies, Tramps and Weed" and "Grace 0, Jack 2000") | Nominated | |
| 2001 | Outstanding Supporting Actress in a Comedy Series | Megan Mullally (for "Husbands and Trophy Wives" and "Crazy in Love") | Nominated | |
| 2001 | Outstanding Art Direction for a Multi-Camera Series | Glenda Rovello and Melinda Ritz (for "Lows in the Mid-Eighties") | Won | |
| 2001 | Outstanding Casting for a Comedy Series | Tracy Lilienfield | Nominated | |
| 2001 | Outstanding Cinematography for a Multi-Camera Series | Tony Askins (for "Sons & Lovers") | Won | |
| 2001 | Outstanding Costumes for a Series | Lori Eskowitz and Mary Walbridge (for "Lows in the Mid-Eighties") | Nominated | |
| 2001 | Outstanding Directing for a Comedy Series | James Burrows (for "Lows in the Mid-Eighties") | Nominated | |
| 2001 | Outstanding Multi-Camera Picture Editing for a Series | Peter Chakos (for "Lows in the Mid-Eighties") | Nominated | |
| 2001 | Outstanding Writing for a Comedy Series | Jeff Greenstein (for "Lows in the Mid-Eighties") | Nominated | |
| 2002 | Outstanding Comedy Series | | Nominated | |
| 2002 | Outstanding Lead Actress in a Comedy Series | Debra Messing (for "Bed, Bath and Beyond") | Nominated | |
| 2002 | Outstanding Supporting Actor in a Comedy Series | Sean Hayes (for "A Chorus Lie" and "Went to a Garden Potty") | Nominated | |
| 2002 | Outstanding Supporting Actress in a Comedy Series | Megan Mullally (for "Grace in the Hole" and "A.I. Artificial Insemination") | Nominated | |
| 2002 | Outstanding Art Direction for a Multi-Camera Series | Glenda Rovello and Melinda Ritz (for "Cheatin' Trouble Blues") | Won | |
| 2002 | Outstanding Casting for a Comedy Series | Tracy Lilienfield | Nominated | |
| 2002 | Outstanding Cinematography for a Multi-Camera Series | Tony Askins (for "A Chorus Lie") | Won | |
| 2002 | Outstanding Costumes for a Series | Lori Eskowitz and Mary Walbridge (for "A Moveable Feast") | Nominated | |
| 2002 | Outstanding Directing for a Comedy Series | James Burrows (for "A Chorus Lie") | Nominated | |
| 2002 | Outstanding Guest Actor in a Comedy Series | Michael Douglas | Nominated | |
| 2002 | Outstanding Guest Actress in a Comedy Series | Glenn Close | Nominated | |
| 2002 | Outstanding Multi-Camera Picture Editing for a Series | Peter Chakos (for "A Chorus Lie") | Nominated | |
| 2002 | Outstanding Multi-Camera Sound Mixing for a Series or Special | Peter Damski, Todd Grace and Craig Porter (for "Fagel Attraction") | Nominated | |
| 2003 | Outstanding Comedy Series | | Nominated | |
| 2003 | Outstanding Lead Actor in a Comedy Series | Eric McCormack (for "The Kid Stays Out of the Picture") | Nominated | |
| 2003 | Outstanding Lead Actress in a Comedy Series | Debra Messing (for "The Kid Stays Out of the Picture") | Won | |
| 2003 | Outstanding Supporting Actor in a Comedy Series | Sean Hayes (for "Bacon & Eggs" and "Sex, Losers, and Videotape") | Nominated | |
| 2003 | Outstanding Supporting Actress in a Comedy Series | Megan Mullally (for "The Honeymoon's Over" and "23") | Nominated | |
| 2003 | Outstanding Art Direction for a Multi-Camera Series | Glenda Rovello and Melinda Ritz (for "23") | Won | |
| 2003 | Outstanding Casting for a Comedy Series | Tracy Lilienfield | Nominated | |
| 2003 | Outstanding Cinematography for a Multi-Camera Series | Tony Askins (for "23") | Won | |
| 2003 | Outstanding Directing for a Comedy Series | James Burrows (for "24") | Nominated | |
| 2003 | Outstanding Guest Actor in a Comedy Series | Gene Wilder | Won | |
| 2003 | Outstanding Multi-Camera Picture Editing for a Series | Peter Chakos (for "Marry Me a Little, Marry Me a Little More") | Nominated | |
| 2003 | Outstanding Multi-Camera Sound Mixing for a Series or Special | Peter Damski, Todd Grace and Craig Porter (for "23") | Nominated | |
| 2004 | Outstanding Comedy Series | | Nominated | |
| 2004 | Outstanding Supporting Actor in a Comedy Series | Sean Hayes (for "Me & Mr. Jones" and "I Never Cheered for My Father") | Nominated | |
| 2004 | Outstanding Supporting Actress in a Comedy Series | Megan Mullally (for "Heart Like a Wheelchair" and "Speechless") | Nominated | |
| 2004 | Outstanding Art Direction for a Multi-Camera Series | Glenda Rovello and Melinda Ritz (for "I Do, Oh, No, You Di-in't") | Nominated | |
| 2004 | Outstanding Cinematography for a Multi-Camera Series | Tony Askins (for "Ice Cream Balls") | Nominated | |
| 2004 | Outstanding Guest Actor in a Comedy Series | John Cleese | Nominated | |
| 2004 | Outstanding Guest Actress in a Comedy Series | Eileen Brennan | Nominated | |
| 2004 | Outstanding Multi-Camera Picture Editing for a Series | Peter Chakos (for "Looking for Mr. Good Enough") | Nominated | |
| 2004 | Outstanding Multi-Camera Sound Mixing for a Series or Special | Peter Damski, Todd Grace and Craig Porter (for "Looking for Mr. Good Enough") | Nominated | |
| 2005 | Outstanding Comedy Series | | Nominated | |
| 2005 | Outstanding Lead Actor in a Comedy Series | Eric McCormack (for "Queens for a Day") | Nominated | |
| 2005 | Outstanding Supporting Actor in a Comedy Series | Sean Hayes (for "Queens for a Day" and "It's a Dad, Dad, Dad, Dad World") | Nominated | |
| 2005 | Outstanding Supporting Actress in a Comedy Series | Megan Mullally (for "The Birds and the Bees" and "Saving Grace, Again") | Nominated | |
| 2005 | Outstanding Art Direction for a Multi-Camera Series | Glenda Rovello and Melinda Ritz (for "The Birds and the Bees") | Nominated | |
| 2005 | Outstanding Casting for a Comedy Series | Tracy Lilienfield | Nominated | |
| 2005 | Outstanding Cinematography for a Multi-Camera Series | Tony Askins (for "Friends With Benefits") | Won | |
| 2005 | Outstanding Directing for a Comedy Series | James Burrows (for "It's a Dad, Dad, Dad, Dad World") | Nominated | |
| 2005 | Outstanding Guest Actor in a Comedy Series | Alec Baldwin | Nominated | |
| 2005 | Outstanding Guest Actor in a Comedy Series | Bobby Cannavale | Won | |
| 2005 | Outstanding Guest Actor in a Comedy Series | Victor Garber | Nominated | |
| 2005 | Outstanding Guest Actor in a Comedy Series | Jeff Goldblum | Nominated | |
| 2005 | Outstanding Guest Actress in a Comedy Series | Blythe Danner | Nominated | |
| 2005 | Outstanding Multi-Camera Picture Editing for a Series | Peter Chakos (for "It's a Dad, Dad, Dad, Dad World") | Nominated | |
| 2005 | Outstanding Multi-Camera Sound Mixing for a Series or Special | Peter Damski, Kathy Oldham and Craig Porter (for "Friends With Benefits" and "Kiss and Tell") | Nominated | |
| 2006 | Outstanding Lead Actress in a Comedy Series | Debra Messing (for "The Finale") | Nominated | |
| 2006 | Outstanding Supporting Actor in a Comedy Series | Sean Hayes (for "Alive and Schticking" and "I Love L. Gay") | Nominated | |
| 2006 | Outstanding Supporting Actress in a Comedy Series | Megan Mullally (for "The Finale") | Won | |
| 2006 | Outstanding Art Direction for a Multi-Camera Series | Glenda Rovello and Melinda Ritz (for "The Finale") | Nominated | |
| 2006 | Outstanding Guest Actor in a Comedy Series | Alec Baldwin | Nominated | |
| 2006 | Outstanding Guest Actor in a Comedy Series | Leslie Jordan | Won | |
| 2006 | Outstanding Guest Actress in a Comedy Series | Blythe Danner | Nominated | |
| 2006 | Outstanding Hairstyling for a Series | Luke O'Connor and Tim Burke (for "The Finale") | Nominated | |
| 2006 | Outstanding Makeup for a Series (Non-Prosthetic) | Patricia Bunch, Karen Kawahara, Farah Bunch and Greg Cannomfor (for "The Finale") | Nominated | |
| 2006 | Outstanding Multi-Camera Picture Editing for a Series | Peter Chakos (for "The Finale") | Nominated | |
| 2018 | Outstanding Supporting Actress in a Comedy Series | Megan Mullally (for "Rosario’s Quinceanera") | Nominated | |
| 2018 | Outstanding Guest Actress in a Comedy Series | Molly Shannon (for "There’s Something About Larry”) | Nominated | |
| 2018 | Outstanding Cinematography for a Multi-Camera Series | Gary Baum (for "A Gaye Olde Christmas") | Won | |
| 2018 | Outstanding Multi-Camera Picture Editing for a Comedy Series | Peter Beyt (for "Grandpa Jack") | Won | |
| 2018 | Outstanding Production Design for a Narrative Program (Half-Hour or Less) | Glenda Rovello, Conny Marinos, Peter Gurski (for "A Gaye Olde Christmas") | Nominated | |
| 2019 | Outstanding Production Design for a Narrative Program (Half-Hour or Less) | Glenda Rovello, Conny Marinos, Peter Gurski (for "Jack's Big Gay Wedding") | Nominated | |
| 2019 | Outstanding Cinematography for a Multi-Camera Series | Gary Baum (for "Family, Trip") | Nominated | |
| 2019 | Outstanding Multi-Camera Picture Editing for a Comedy Series | Peter Beyt (for "Family, Trip") | Nominated | |
| 2020 | Outstanding Directing for a Comedy Series | James Burrows (for "We Love Lucy") | Nominated | |
| 2020 | Outstanding Production Design for a Narrative Program (Half-Hour or Less) | Glenda Rovello, Conny Marinos, Peter Gurski (for "We Love Lucy") | Nominated | |
| 2020 | Outstanding Cinematography for a Multi-Camera Series | Gary Baum (for "Accidentally on Porpoise") | Nominated | |
| 2020 | Outstanding Multi-Camera Picture Editing for a Comedy Series | Peter Beyt (for "We Love Lucy") | Nominated | |
| 2020 | Outstanding Multi-Camera Picture Editing for a Comedy Series | Joseph Fulton (for "What a Dump") | Nominated | |

=== Screen Actors Guild Awards ===
The Screen Actors Guild Award is an accolade given by the Screen Actors Guild‐American Federation of Television and Radio Artists to recognize outstanding performances in film and primetime television. Will & Grace has received seven awards from twenty-one nominations.

| Year | Category | Nominee | Result | Ref |
|---|---|---|---|---|
| 2000 | Outstanding Performance by a Male Actor in a Comedy Series | Sean Hayes | Nominated | |
| 2000 | Outstanding Performance by a Female Actor in a Comedy Series | Debra Messing | Nominated | |
| 2000 | Outstanding Performance by a Female Actor in a Comedy Series | Megan Mullally | Nominated | |
| 2000 | Outstanding Performance by an Ensemble in a Comedy Series | | Won | |
| 2001 | Outstanding Performance by a Male Actor in a Comedy Series | Sean Hayes | Won | |
| 2001 | Outstanding Performance by a Female Actor in a Comedy Series | Megan Mullally | Won | |
| 2001 | Outstanding Performance by an Ensemble in a Comedy Series | | Nominated | |
| 2002 | Outstanding Performance by a Male Actor in a Comedy Series | Sean Hayes | Won | |
| 2002 | Outstanding Performance by a Female Actor in a Comedy Series | Megan Mullally | Won | |
| 2002 | Outstanding Performance by an Ensemble in a Comedy Series | | Nominated | |
| 2003 | Outstanding Performance by a Male Actor in a Comedy Series | Sean Hayes | Nominated | |
| 2003 | Outstanding Performance by a Female Actor in a Comedy Series | Debra Messing | Nominated | |
| 2003 | Outstanding Performance by a Female Actor in a Comedy Series | Megan Mullally | Won | |
| 2003 | Outstanding Performance by an Ensemble in a Comedy Series | | Nominated | |
| 2004 | Outstanding Performance by a Male Actor in a Comedy Series | Sean Hayes | Nominated | |
| 2004 | Outstanding Performance by a Female Actor in a Comedy Series | Megan Mullally | Nominated | |
| 2004 | Outstanding Performance by an Ensemble in a Comedy Series | | Nominated | |
| 2005 | Outstanding Performance by a Male Actor in a Comedy Series | Sean Hayes | Won | |
| 2005 | Outstanding Performance by a Female Actor in a Comedy Series | Megan Mullally | Nominated | |
| 2006 | Outstanding Performance by a Female Actor in a Comedy Series | Megan Mullally | Nominated | |
| 2018 | Outstanding Performance by a Male Actor in a Comedy Series | Sean Hayes | Nominated | |

=== Golden Globe Awards ===
The Golden Globe Award is an accolade bestowed by the 93 members of the Hollywood Foreign Press Association, recognizing excellence in film and television, both domestic and foreign. Will & Grace has received 30 nominations.

| Year | Category | Nominee | Result | Ref |
|---|---|---|---|---|
| 2000 | Best Television Series – Musical or Comedy | | Nominated | |
| 2000 | Best Actor – Television Series Musical or Comedy | Eric McCormack | Nominated | |
| 2000 | Best Actress – Television Series Musical or Comedy | Debra Messing | Nominated | |
| 2000 | Best Supporting Actor – Television Series Musical or Comedy | Sean Hayes | Nominated | |
| 2001 | Best Television Series – Musical or Comedy | | Nominated | |
| 2001 | Best Actor – Television Series Musical or Comedy | Eric McCormack | Nominated | |
| 2001 | Best Actress – Television Series Musical or Comedy | Debra Messing | Nominated | |
| 2001 | Best Supporting Actor – Television Series Musical or Comedy | Sean Hayes | Nominated | |
| 2001 | Best Supporting Actress – Television Series Musical or Comedy | Megan Mullally | Nominated | |
| 2002 | Best Television Series – Musical or Comedy | | Nominated | |
| 2002 | Best Actor – Television Series Musical or Comedy | Eric McCormack | Nominated | |
| 2002 | Best Actress – Television Series Musical or Comedy | Debra Messing | Nominated | |
| 2002 | Best Supporting Actor – Television Series Musical or Comedy | Sean Hayes | Nominated | |
| 2002 | Best Supporting Actress – Television Series Musical or Comedy | Megan Mullally | Nominated | |
| 2003 | Best Television Series – Musical or Comedy | | Nominated | |
| 2003 | Best Actor – Television Series Musical or Comedy | Eric McCormack | Nominated | |
| 2003 | Best Actress – Television Series Musical or Comedy | Debra Messing | Nominated | |
| 2003 | Best Supporting Actor – Television Series Musical or Comedy | Sean Hayes | Nominated | |
| 2003 | Best Supporting Actress – Television Series Musical or Comedy | Megan Mullally | Nominated | |
| 2004 | Best Television Series – Musical or Comedy | | Nominated | |
| 2004 | Best Actor – Television Series Musical or Comedy | Eric McCormack | Nominated | |
| 2004 | Best Actress – Television Series Musical or Comedy | Debra Messing | Nominated | |
| 2004 | Best Supporting Actor – Television Series Musical or Comedy | Sean Hayes | Nominated | |
| 2004 | Best Supporting Actress – Television Series Musical or Comedy | Megan Mullally | Nominated | |
| 2005 | Best Television Series – Musical or Comedy | | Nominated | |
| 2005 | Best Actress – Television Series Musical or Comedy | Debra Messing | Nominated | |
| 2005 | Best Supporting Actor – Television Series Musical or Comedy | Sean Hayes | Nominated | |
| 2018 | Best Television Series – Musical or Comedy | | Nominated | |
| 2018 | Best Actor – Television Series Musical or Comedy | Eric McCormack | Nominated | |
| 2019 | Best Actress – Television Series Musical or Comedy | Debra Messing | Nominated | |

=== Television Critics Association Awards ===
The Television Critics Association Awards are awards presented by the Television Critics Association in recognition of excellence in television. Will & Grace received eight nominations.

| Year | Category | Nominee | Result | Ref |
|---|---|---|---|---|
| 1999 | New Program | | Nominated | |
| 1999 | Outstanding Achievement in Comedy | | Nominated | |
| 1999 | Individual Achievement in Comedy | Sean Hayes | Nominated | |
| 1999 | Individual Achievement in Comedy | Megan Mullally | Nominated | |
| 2000 | Outstanding Achievement in Comedy | | Nominated | |
| 2000 | Individual Achievement in Comedy | Sean Hayes | Nominated | |
| 2000 | Individual Achievement in Comedy | Megan Mullally | Nominated | |
| 2006 | Heritage Award | | Nominated | |

== Other awards ==
=== ADG Excellence in Production Design Awards ===
The ADG Excellence in Production Design Awards are an award presented annually by the Art Directors Guild to recognize excellence in production design and art direction in the film and television industries. Will & Grace received two awards from four nominations.

| Year | Category | Nominee | Result | Ref |
|---|---|---|---|---|
| 2001 | Excellence in Production Design for a Multi-Camera Series | Glenda Rovello (for "Prison Blues") | Won | |
| 2003 | Excellence in Production Design for a Multi-Camera Series | Glenda Rovello (for "Fanilow") | Nominated | |
| 2004 | Excellence in Production Design for a Multi-Camera Series | Glenda Rovello (for "Queens for a Day") | Won | |
| 2005 | Excellence in Production Design for a Multi-Camera Series | Glenda Rovello (for "The Old Man and the Sea") | Nominated | |
| 2017 | Excellence in Production Design for a Multi-Camera Series | Glenda Rovello (for "Eleven Years Later" and "A Gay Olde Christmas") | Won | |
| 2019 | Excellence in Production Design for a Multi-Camera Series | Glenda Rovello (for "Family, Trip", "The Things We Do for Love" and "Conscious Coupling") | Nominated | |
| 2020 | Excellence in Production Design for a Multi-Camera Series | Glenda Rovello (for "Accidentally on Porpoise", "We Love Lucy" and "It's Time") | Won | |

=== American Cinema Editors ===
Founded in 1950, American Cinema Editorsis an honorary society of film editors that are voted in based on the qualities of professional achievements, their education of others, and their dedication to editing. Will & Grace received one award from three nominations.

| Year | Category | Nominee | Result | Ref |
|---|---|---|---|---|
| 2003 | Best Edited Half-Hour Series for Television | Peter Chakos (for "A Chorus Lie") | Nominated | |
| 2004 | Best Edited Half-Hour Series for Television | Peter Chakos (for "Last Ex to Brooklyn") | Won | |
| 2005 | Best Edited Half-Hour Series for Television | Peter Chakos (for "I Do, Oh No You Di-In't") | Nominated | |

=== American Comedy Awards ===
The American Comedy Awards are a group of awards presented annually in the United States recognizing performances and performers in the field of comedy, with an emphasis on television comedy and comedy films. Will & Grace received two awards from nine nominations.

| Year | Category | Nominee | Result | Ref |
|---|---|---|---|---|
| 2000 | Funniest Television Series | | Nominated | |
| 2000 | Funniest Female Performer in a TV Series | Debra Messing | Nominated | |
| 2000 | Funniest Supporting Male Performer in a TV Series | Sean Hayes | Nominated | |
| 2000 | Funniest Supporting Female Performer in a TV Series | Megan Mullally | Nominated | |
| 2001 | Funniest Television Series | | Nominated | |
| 2001 | Funniest Female Performer in a TV Series | Debra Messing | Nominated | |
| 2001 | Funniest Supporting Male Performer in a TV Series | Sean Hayes | Won | |
| 2001 | Funniest Supporting Female Performer in a TV Series | Megan Mullally | Won | |
| 2001 | Funniest Male Guest Appearance in a TV Series | Gregory Hines | Nominated | |

=== American Latino Media Arts Awards ===
The American Latino Media Arts Award is an award highlighting the best American Latino contributions to music, television, and film. Will & Grace received two nominations.

| Year | Category | Nominee | Result | Ref |
|---|---|---|---|---|
| 2001 | Outstanding Actress in a Television Series | Shelley Morrison | Nominated | |
| 2002 | Outstanding Supporting Actress in a Television Series | Shelley Morrison | Nominated | |

=== British Comedy Awards ===
The British Comedy Awards are an annual awards ceremony in the United Kingdom celebrating notable comedians and entertainment performances of the previous year. Will & Grace received one nomination.

| Year | Category | Nominee | Result | Ref |
|---|---|---|---|---|
| 2003 | Best International Comedy TV Show | | Nominated | |

=== Casting Society of America ===
Since October 1985, the Casting Society of America has presented the Artios Awards for excellence in casting. Members are honored in over eighteen different theatrical casting categories in simultaneous events held in New York City and Beverly Hills, California. Will & Grace received three awards from nine nominations.

| Year | Category | Nominee | Result | Ref |
|---|---|---|---|---|
| 1999 | Best Casting for TV – Comedy Pilot | Tracy Lilienfield | Won | |
| 1999 | Best Casting for TV – Episodic Comedy | Tracy Lilienfield | Nominated | |
| 2000 | Best Casting for TV – Episodic Comedy | Tracy Lilienfield | Won | |
| 2001 | Best Casting for TV – Episodic Comedy | Tracy Lilienfield | Nominated | |
| 2002 | Best Casting for TV – Episodic Comedy | Tracy Lilienfield | Won | |
| 2003 | Best Casting for TV – Episodic Comedy | Tracy Lilienfield | Nominated | |
| 2004 | Best Casting for TV – Episodic Comedy | Tracy Lilienfield | Nominated | |
| 2005 | Best Casting for TV – Episodic Comedy | Tracy Lilienfield | Nominated | |
| 2006 | Best Casting for TV – Episodic Comedy | Tracy Lilienfield | Nominated | |

=== Critics' Choice Television Awards ===
The Critics' Choice Television Awards have been presented annually by the Broadcast Television Journalists Association since 2011. Will & Grace has received one nomination.

| Year | Category | Nominee | Result | Ref |
|---|---|---|---|---|
| 2018 | Best Supporting Actor in a Comedy Series | Sean Hayes | Nominated | |

=== Costume Designers Guild ===
Founded in 1999, the Costume Designers Awards honors costume designers in Motion Pictures, Television, and Commercials annually. Will & Grace received three nominations.

| Year | Category | Nominee | Result | Ref |
|---|---|---|---|---|
| 2001 | Excellence in Costume Design – Contemporary Series | Lori Eskowitz | Nominated | |
| 2002 | Excellence in Costume Design – Contemporary Series | Lori Eskowitz | Nominated | |
| 2004 | Excellence in Costume Design – Contemporary Series | Lori Eskowitz | Nominated | |

=== Directors Guild of America Awards ===
The Directors Guild of America Awards are issued annually by the Directors Guild of America. The first DGA Award was an “Honorary Life Member” award issued in 1938 to D. W. Griffith. The statues are made by New York firm, Society Awards. Will & Grace received one award from seven nominations.

| Year | Category | Nominee | Result | Ref |
|---|---|---|---|---|
| 1999 | Outstanding Directorial Achievement in Comedy Series | James Burrows (for "Pilot") | Nominated | |
| 2000 | Outstanding Directorial Achievement in Comedy Series | James Burrows (for "Yours, Mine or Ours") | Nominated | |
| 2001 | Outstanding Directorial Achievement in Comedy Series | James Burrows (for "Lows in the Mid-Eighties") | Won | |
| 2002 | Outstanding Directorial Achievement in Comedy Series | James Burrows (for "Bed, Bath & Beyond") | Nominated | |
| 2003 | Outstanding Directorial Achievement in Comedy Series | James Burrows (for "Marry Me a Little, Marry Me a Little More") | Nominated | |
| 2004 | Outstanding Directorial Achievement in Comedy Series | James Burrows (for "Last Ex to Brooklyn") | Nominated | |
| 2006 | Outstanding Directorial Achievement in Comedy Series | James Burrows (for "Alive and Schticking") | Nominated | |

=== GLAAD Media Awards ===
The GLAAD Media Award is an accolade bestowed by the Gay & Lesbian Alliance Against Defamation to recognize and honor various branches of the media for their outstanding representations of the lesbian, gay, bisexual and transgender (LGBT) community and the issues that affect their lives. Will & Grace received seven awards from eight nominations.

| Year | Category | Nominee | Result | Ref |
|---|---|---|---|---|
| 1999 | Outstanding TV Comedy Series | | Won | |
| 2000 | Outstanding TV Comedy Series | | Won | |
| 2001 | Outstanding TV Comedy Series | | Won | |
| 2002 | Outstanding Comedy Series | | Won | |
| 2003 | Outstanding Comedy Series | | Won | |
| 2004 | Outstanding Comedy Series | | Nominated | |
| 2005 | Outstanding Comedy Series | | Won | |
| 2006 | Outstanding Comedy Series | | Won | |

=== Gracie Awards ===
| Year | Category | Nominee | Result | Ref |
|---|---|---|---|---|
| 2018 | Actress in a Supporting Role - Comedy or Musical | Megan Mullally | Won | |

=== GoldDerby Awards ===
| Year | Category | Nominee | Result |
|---|---|---|---|
| 2018 | Best Comedy Series | | Nominated |
| 2018 | Best Comedy Actor | Eric McCormack | Nominated |
| 2018 | Best Comedy Supporting Actress | Megan Mullally | Nominated |
| 2018 | Best Comedy Supporting Actor | Sean Hayes | Nominated |
| 2018 | Best Comedy Episode of the Year | Rosario’s Quincinara | Nominated |

=== Hollywood Makeup Artist and Hair Stylist Guild ===
| Year | Category | Nominee | Result | Ref |
|---|---|---|---|---|
| 2000 | Best Contemporary Makeup for TV – Episode of a Regular Series | Patricia Bunch and Cynthia Bachman (for "Big Brother is Coming") | Nominated | |
| 2000 | Best Contemporary Makeup for TV – Episode of a Regular Series | Patricia Bunch and Cynthia Bachman (for "I Never Promised You an Olive Garden") | Nominated | |
| 2000 | Best Contemporary Hair Styling for TV – Episode of a Regular Series | Tim Burke (for "Homo for the Holidays") | Nominated | |
| 2001 | Best Period Makeup for TV – Episode of a Regular Series | Patricia Bunch and Karen Kawahara (for "Lows in the Mid-Eighties") | Nominated | |
| 2002 | Best Contemporary Hair Styling for TV – Episode of a Regular Series | Tim Burke, Luke O'Connor, Maria Valdivia and Mel Stetson (for "The Moveable Feast") | Won | |

=== National Television Awards ===
The National Television Awards is a British television awards ceremony, broadcast by the ITV network and initiated in 1995. The National Television Awards are the most prominent ceremony for which the results are voted on by the general public. Will & Grace received two nominations.

| Year | Category | Nominee | Result | Ref |
|---|---|---|---|---|
| 2005 | Most Popular Comedy Programme | | Nominated | |
| 2006 | Most Popular Comedy Programme | | Nominated | |

=== People's Choice Awards ===
The People's Choice Awards is an American awards show, recognizing the people and the work of popular culture, voted on by the general public. Will & Grace received two awards.

| Year | Category | Nominee | Result | Ref |
|---|---|---|---|---|
| 1999 | Favorite Television New Comedy Series | | Won | |
| 2005 | Favorite Television Comedy Series | | Won | |

=== Producers Guild of America ===
The Producers Guild of America Award was originally established in 1990 by the Producers Guild of America as the Golden Laurel Awards, created by PGA Treasurer Joel Freeman with the support of Guild President Leonard Stern, in order to honor the visionaries who produce and execute motion picture and television product. Will & Grace received five nominations.

| Year | Category | Nominee | Result | Ref |
|---|---|---|---|---|
| 2001 | Best Episodic Comedy | | Nominated | |
| 2002 | Best Episodic Comedy | | Nominated | |
| 2003 | Best Episodic Comedy | | Nominated | |
| 2004 | Best Episodic Comedy | | Nominated | |
| 2005 | Best Episodic Comedy | | Nominated | |

=== Rose d'Or Light Entertainment Festival ===
The Rose d'Or (Golden Rose) is an international awards festival in entertainment broadcasting and programming. Will & Grace received one award.

| Year | Category | Nominee | Result | Ref |
|---|---|---|---|---|
| 2000 | Best Sitcom | | Won | |

=== Satellite Awards ===
The Satellite Awards are annual awards given by the International Press Academy that are commonly noted in entertainment industry journals and blogs. Will & Grace received two awards from nine nominations.

| Year | Category | Nominee | Result | Ref |
|---|---|---|---|---|
| 2000 | Best Actor – Television Series Musical or Comedy | Eric McCormack | Nominated | |
| 2001 | Best Actor – Television Series Musical or Comedy | Sean Hayes | Nominated | |
| 2002 | Best Actor – Television Series Musical or Comedy | Eric McCormack | Nominated | |
| 2002 | Best Actress – Television Series Musical or Comedy | Debra Messing | Won | |
| 2003 | Best Actor – Television Series Musical or Comedy | Eric McCormack | Nominated | |
| 2003 | Best Actress – Television Series Musical or Comedy | Debra Messing | Won | |
| 2003 | Best Supporting Actor – Series, Miniseries or Television Film | Sean Hayes | Nominated | |
| 2003 | Best Supporting Actress – Series, Miniseries or Television Film | Megan Mullally | Nominated | |
| 2004 | Best Actor – Television Series Musical or Comedy | Eric McCormack | Nominated | |
| 2004 | Best Actress – Television Series Musical or Comedy | Debra Messing | Nominated | |
| 2004 | Best Supporting Actor – Series, Miniseries or Television Film | Sean Hayes | Nominated | |

=== Teen Choice Awards ===
The Teen Choice Awards is an annual awards show that airs on the Fox television network. The awards honor the year's biggest achievements in music, movies, sports, television, fashion, and more, voted by adolescent viewers (ages 10 to 15). Will & Grace received three awards from fourteen nominations.

| Year | Category | Nominee | Result | Ref |
|---|---|---|---|---|
| 2000 | Choice TV Show: Comedy | | Nominated | |
| 2000 | Choice TV: Sidekick | Sean Hayes | Won | |
| 2001 | Choice TV Show: Comedy | | Nominated | |
| 2001 | Choice TV: Actor | Eric McCormack | Nominated | |
| 2001 | Choice TV: Actress | Debra Messing | Nominated | |
| 2001 | Choice TV: Sidekick | Sean Hayes | Won | |
| 2001 | Choice TV: Sidekick | Megan Mullally | Nominated | |
| 2002 | Choice TV Show: Comedy | | Nominated | |
| 2002 | Choice TV Actor: Comedy | Sean Hayes | Nominated | |
| 2002 | Choice TV Actress: Comedy | Debra Messing | Nominated | |
| 2002 | Choice TV Actress: Comedy | Megan Mullally | Nominated | |
| 2004 | Choice TV: Sidekick | Sean Hayes | Won | |
| 2005 | Choice TV: Sidekick | Sean Hayes | Nominated | |
| 2006 | Choice TV Actress: Comedy | Debra Messing | Nominated | |

=== TV Guide Awards ===
The TV Guide Award was an annual award created by the editors of TV Guide magazine, as a readers poll to honor outstanding programs and performers in the American television industry. Will & Grace received two awards from four nominations.

| Year | Category | Nominee | Result | Ref |
|---|---|---|---|---|
| 2001 | Actor of the Year in a Comedy Series | Eric McCormack | Nominated | |
| 2001 | Actress of the Year in a Comedy Series | Debra Messing | Won | |
| 2001 | Supporting Actor of the Year in a Comedy Series | Sean Hayes | Won | |
| 2001 | Supporting Actress of the Year in a Comedy Series | Megan Mullally | Nominated | |

=== TV Land Awards ===
The TV Land Awards is an American television awards ceremony that generally commemorates shows now off the air, rather than in current production as with the Emmys. Will & Grace received two nominations.

| Year | Category | Nominee | Result | Ref |
|---|---|---|---|---|
| 2005 | Chicest Sitcom Décor | Will's Apartment | Nominated | |
| 2006 | Favorite Made-for-TV Maid | Shelley Morrison | Nominated | |

=== Viewers for Quality Television Awards ===
Viewers for Quality Television was an American nonprofit organization founded in 1984 to advocate network television series that members of the organization voted to be of the "highest quality." The group's goal was to rescue "...critically acclaimed programs from cancellation despite their Nielsen program rating." Will & Grace received one award from eleven nominations.

| Year | Category | Nominee | Result | Ref |
|---|---|---|---|---|
| 1999 | Founder's Award for Unheralded Excellence | | Won | |
| 1999 | Best Quality Comedy Series | | Nominated | |
| 1999 | Best Actor in a Quality Comedy Series | Eric McCormack | Nominated | |
| 1999 | Best Actress in a Quality Comedy Series | Debra Messing | Nominated | |
| 1999 | Best Supporting Actor in a Quality Comedy Series | Sean Hayes | Nominated | |
| 1999 | Best Supporting Actress in a Quality Comedy Series | Megan Mullally | Nominated | |
| 2000 | Best Quality Comedy Series | | Nominated | |
| 2000 | Best Actor in a Quality Comedy Series | Eric McCormack | Nominated | |
| 2000 | Best Actress in a Quality Comedy Series | Debra Messing | Nominated | |
| 2000 | Best Supporting Actor in a Quality Comedy Series | Sean Hayes | Nominated | |
| 2000 | Best Supporting Actress in a Quality Comedy Series | Megan Mullally | Nominated | |

=== Writers Guild of America Awards ===
The Writers Guild of America Awards for outstanding achievements in film, television, radio, and video game writing, including both fiction and non-fiction categories, have been presented annually by the Writers Guild of America, East and Writers Guild of America, West since 1949. Will & Grace has received two nominations.

| Year | Category | Nominee | Result | Ref |
|---|---|---|---|---|
| 2000 | Best Writing: Episodic Comedy | Jeff Greenstein (for "Hey La, Hey La, My Ex-Boyfriend's Back") | Nominated | |
| 2018 | Best Writing: Episodic Comedy | Tracy Poust & Jon Kinnally (for "Rosario's Quinceanera") | Won | |

=== Young Artist Awards ===
The Young Artist Award is an accolade bestowed by the Young Artist Association, a non-profit organization founded in 1978 to honor excellence of youth performers, and to provide scholarships for young artists who may be physically and/or financially challenged. Will & Grace received one nomination.

| Year | Category | Nominee | Result | Ref |
|---|---|---|---|---|
| 2006 | Best Performance in a TV Series – Guest Starring Young Actor | Reed Alexander | Nominated | |
