= Final Approach (2007 film) =

- Genre: Action, Thriller
- Written by: Adam Armus; Nora Kay Foster
- Directed by: Armand Mastroianni
- Starring: Dean Cain; Anthony Michael Hall; Ernie Hudson
- Theme music composer: Marc Streitenfeld
- Country of origin: United States
- Original language: English

Production
- Producer: Armand Mastroianni
- Cinematography: Dane Peterson
- Editor: Pietro Scalia
- Running time: 120 minutes

Original release
- Network: Hallmark Channel
- Release: May 24, 2008

Final Approach is a 2008 American made-for-television action thriller film featuring an ensemble cast led by Dean Cain as disgraced FBI hostage negotiator Jack Bender. The film premiered on Hallmark Channel on May 24, 2008.

== Plot summary ==
Jack Bender (Dean Cain) suddenly finds himself in a hostile situation as a group of highly trained and well-armed terrorists, led by Greg Gilliad (Anthony Michael Hall), seize the airplane on which he is traveling, a Lockheed L-1011 of Infinity Air Flight 732 from Newark International Airport to LAX. Bender must re-immerse himself into a world he thought he left behind forever.

== Cast ==
- Dean Cain as Jack Bender
- Anthony Michael Hall as Greg Gilliad
- Ernie Hudson as Agent Dawson
- Lea Thompson as Alicia Bender
- Shailene Woodley as Maya Bender
- Sunny Mabrey as Sela Jameson
- William Forsythe as Silas Jensen
- Barry Livingston as Brian Fields
- Judith Hoag as Marie Gilford
- Stacy Haiduk as Alexa Windom

== Reception ==
The film, as of March 2016, holds a 0% rating with critics not critiquing and the audience rates the program as 100% favorable on Rotten Tomatoes.
