= Will & Grace season 4 =

Will & Grace
- Season 4
- American DVD cover
- No. of episodes: 27

Release
- Original network: NBC
- Original release: September 27, 2001 – May 16, 2002

Season chronology
- ← Previous; Season 3 Next → Season 5

The fourth season of Will & Grace premiered on September 27, 2001, and concluded on May 16, 2002. It consisted of 27 episodes.

== Cast and characters ==
=== Main cast ===
- Eric McCormack as Will Truman
- Debra Messing as Grace Adler
- Megan Mullally as Karen Walker
- Sean Hayes as Jack McFarland
- Shelley Morrison as Rosario Salazar
- Michael Angarano as Elliot

=== Recurring cast ===
- Woody Harrelson as Nathan
- Marshall Manesh as Mr. Zamir
- Tim Bagley as Larry
- Leslie Jordan as Beverley Leslie
- Tom Gallop as Rob
- Leigh-Allyn Baker as Ellen

=== Special guest stars ===
- Adam Goldberg as Kevin Wolchek
- Eileen Brennan as Zandra
- Parker Posey as Dorleen
- Debbie Reynolds as Bobbi Adler
- Lainie Kazan as Aunt Honey
- Beau Bridges as Daniel McFarland
- Blythe Danner as Marilyn Truman
- Lesley Ann Warren as Tina
- Rosie O'Donnell as Bonnie
- Matt Damon as Owen
- Sandra Bernhard as herself
- Suzanne Pleshette as Lois Whitley
- Sydney Pollack as George Truman
- Michael Douglas as Detective Gavin Hatch
- Molly Shannon as Val Bassett
- Glenn Close as Fannie Lieber
- Rip Torn as Lionel Banks
- Cher as herself

=== Guest stars ===
- Landry Allbright as Nancy
- Douglas Sills as Teddy Bowers
- Anne Meara as Mrs. Friedman
- Kenneth Mars as Uncle Sid
- Jon Tenney as Paul Truman
- Helen Slater as Peggy Truman
- Nick Offerman as Nick
- Larry Sullivan as Robert
- Dan Gauthier as Curt
- Kirk Baltz as Glenn Gabriel
- Tom Verica as Danny
- Jennifer Aspen as Sarah
- Maggie Wheeler as Polly
- Peter Mackenzie as Mean Guy
- Tom Poston as Norman
- J.P. Manoux as Minion
- Laura Kightlinger as Nurse Sheila

== Episodes ==
No. overall	No. in season	Title	Directed by	Written by	Original release date	Prod. code	U.S. viewers (millions)
72	1	"The Third Wheel Gets the Grace"	James Burrows	David Kohan & Max Mutchnick	September 27, 2001	64401	20.64
Will comes back from his trip to France early and interrupts Grace and Nathan's (Woody Harrelson) continuing romance. Nathan quickly starts to feel left out when Grace spends all her time with Will, but when he tries to horn in on Will and Grace's day of shopping at a sale at Barney's, he becomes grateful for Will's presence in Grace's life and realizes that there are just some things that should be left to Will. Will comes home with a fabulous pair of jeans from France that he insists are men's jeans, but everyone else insists were made for a woman. Jack worries that his son, Elliot, doesn't like him, so he takes the boy back-to-school shopping at Barney's. Elliot tries on things that Jack likes, but is hesitant to buy them, and finally admits that he was only trying them on so that Jack would like him. Rosario reminds Karen that it's their fifteenth anniversary as mistress and maid, so Karen takes Rosario to the sale at Barney's to buy her something. Karen is mystified when Rosario takes forever to decide on a pair of shoes, and finally Rosario admits that she just wanted to spend some time with Karen. Karen runs away, scared of feeling an emotion.
73	2	"Past and Presents"	James Burrows	Tracy Poust & Jon Kinnally	October 4, 2001	64405	19.54
Will pretends to be unthreatened when Kevin (Adam Goldberg), a former classmate, starts working at his firm. However, the memories of Kevin forcing Will do his homework for him come rushing back when Kevin intimidates Will into writing a proposal for one of Kevin's clients. Will tries to stand up to Kevin, but is too wimpy, but gets back at Kevin by writing embarrassing things in the proposal. Grace is mortified when her perfect gift for Nathan's birthday is completely dwarfed by the motorcycle that Karen gets him. She tries to compete with Karen by getting another more expensive gift, but when all she has to give Nathan is her love, Nathan assures her that it's the best gift he's ever received.
74	3	"Crouching Father, Hidden Husband"	James Burrows	Adam Barr	October 11, 2001	64402	19.64
Jack's son Elliot (guest star Michael Angarano) asks a girl named Nancy to the school dance, but she says she already has a date. Jack convinces Grace to be Elliot's date and tags along as an escort. At the dance, it turns out that Nancy's date got sick, so Jack encourages Elliot to ask her to dance while Grace finds herself reliving her own high-school days as a wallflower on the bench with the other losers. Jack tries to teach Elliot to dance, but when his favorite song comes on he pushes his son to the side and takes center stage. Elliot is embarrassed, but he and Nancy bond over having gay parents. Karen has great fun at her lawyer Will's expense when she continues to capriciously summon him for bogus "emergencies" like fixing a fax machine and opening a jar of olives. But when FBI agents start investigating Karen's husband Stanley, and Karen calls Will with this real emergency, he believes she's just crying wolf again and refuses to come to her aid. When the FBI agents come to Will's office, he mocks them, thinking they're actors hired by Karen... until he sees on the news that Stanley has been arrested.
75	4	"Prison Blues"	James Burrows	Alex Herschlag	October 18, 2001	64403	16.26
After Stan is arrested for tax evasion, the gang goes to visit him in prison. Afterwards, Karen awkwardly asks Grace to stay with her in her mansion of an apartment. Grace stays to help out her friend, but after she gets a taste of the good life, Karen has a hard time getting her friend to leave, and finally has to kick her out. As Stan's attorney, Will struggles with stagefright when he babbles during a TV news interview, so Jack convinces him to polish his communication skills by attending an acting class ruled by an imperious teacher. Will has a breakthrough and becomes silky-smooth on camera.
76	5	"Loose Lips Sink Relationships"	James Burrows	Kari Lizer	October 25, 2001	64406	16.20
In a sneaky ploy to bum a night off from work at Barney's department store, a conniving Jack plays matchmaker. Jack knows that his geeky female supervisor has a crush on Will, while Will has a fantasy of modeling in the store's catalogue, so Jack parlays their mutual desires into a "date," even though neither knows the other's intention. Grace compares her previous sexual experience with her boyfriend Nathan's and both are concerned when Grace has had many more partners, but Nathan has had a lot more sex. Karen plays off their mutual insecurities to create a comical situation in which Grace attempts give Nathan the best sex of his life while Nathan is determined to improve his communication with Grace and not have sex at all.
77	6	"The Rules of Engagement"	James Burrows	Jeff Greenstein	November 1, 2001	64407	18.75
Nathan proposes marriage to Grace while they're having sex and she says that's not the way she wants to be proposed to. After talking to Will, Grace realizes that she does, in fact, want to marry Nathan, and decides to propose to him. But Nathan has reconsidered, and when Grace pops the question he breaks up with her, leaving her devastated. Will, Jack, and Karen war over who is more ethical.
78	7	"Bed, Bath, and Beyond"	James Burrows	Jhoni Marchinko	November 8, 2001	64404	19.16
Grace wallows in bed as she grieves over losing Nathan, and Will, Jack and Karen each try, in their own way, to perk her up. The first time she ventures out to the living room, however, she hears a message on the answering machine for Nathan from a travel agent planning a trip for him and someone named Suzie to the Bahamas. Grace retreats back to bed and Karen sends Rosario in after her, but Grace just drags Rosario into watching a childhood slide show. Karen, Jack and Will try to drag Grace into a shower, but she yells at them to stop and makes them realize what's sad in their own lives. All four of them end up in Grace's bed watching a childhood slide show.
79	8	"Star-Spangled Banter"	James Burrows	Cynthia Mort	November 15, 2001	64410	16.59
Will and Grace support different candidates for city council, he the gay candidate, and she the female Jewish candidate. They both plan fund-raisers for their candidate at their apartment on the same night, and are both horrified when their candidates turn out to be bigoted conservatives. Jack is sad when Karen and Elliot don't get along, so he leaves them alone together while he goes to an audition to be a corpse on Six Feet Under. Karen accuses Elliot of being a goody-two-shoes, and he proves that he isn't by prank-calling people. Jack is pleased when he returns and Karen and Elliot are now friends.
80	9	"Moveable Feast"	James Burrows	Kari Lizer	November 22, 2001	64408-64409 (Note: These episodes originally aired as a single double-length episode but are sometimes split into two episodes for syndication, reruns and DVD presentation.)	17.82
81	10	"Moveable Feast"	James Burrows	Kari Lizer	November 22, 2001	64408-64409	17.82
Rather than be apart on Thanksgiving Day, Will and Grace join Jack and Karen for a festive holiday motor tour of their respective dysfunctional families. Karen is miffed when she visits Stan in jail and he tells her to sleep with other men, but then she starts to explore the possibilities. Grace is horrified when Jack lets it slip to her mother that Nathan dumped her, her mother does her I Told You So dance, so Grace insults her mother by telling her she can't act. Jack takes his son Elliot to meet his stepfather who is welcoming to both stepson and stepgrandson... but Jack keeps snapping at perceived slights. Will and his brother compete over who will to ditch their mother and finally Will's brother makes their mother choose who should have to stay, and Will is set free but disturbed when his mother doesn't choose him. The gang leaves Rosario in charge of basting the turkey but she ends up eating part of it. When they get back to have dinner Rosario encourages them to go back out and resolved their family issues so she can get back to work on the turkey. Karen tells Stan she loves him and doesn't want to be with anyone else, Grace apologizes to her mother and tells her she doesn't appreciate the I Told You So, Jack and his step-father try to forge a new relationship, and Will reassures himself that he's his mother's favorite son. Rosario has finished the turkey.
82	11	"Stakin' Care of Business"	James Burrows	Bill Wrubel	December 6, 2001	64411	16.21
Will gets used as a rebound guy and decides to apologize to the guy he used as a rebound many years before. He is horrified when he finds out the two guys are a couple. Jack tries to start his workout catch phrase but he keeps getting pre-empted by a certain personal trainer at the gym. Karen encourages Grace to ask her for a loan when Grace wants to expand her business, but then turns Grace down after demanding a full presentation. Grace leaves Karen stuck when Karen gets trapped in the elevator until Karen admits that she had sound economic reasons for encouraging Grace to keep her business small.
83	12	"Jingle Balls"	James Burrows	Laura Kightlinger	December 13, 2001	64413	19.38
Will is dating a new guy named Robert who is a ballet dancer, but is reluctant to introduce him to Grace. Grace sneakily invites Robert over for dinner and Will is incredibly over-sensitive about Robert's flamboyant danciness and over-analyzes everything Grace says about him. Will accuses Grace of being judgmental, but quickly realizes that Robert does embarrass him and ends the relationship. Jack finagles his way into designing a window at Barney's, but he does a terrible job and his evil boss threatens him with losing his job if he doesn't fix it. Jack prays to Santa for help while Karen asks Grace even though Jack screwed Grace over to get the design job in the first place. Grace secretly redesigns Jack's window and does a great job. Jack thinks it's a Christmas miracle from Santa. (Parker Posey guest stars).
84	13	"Whoa, Nelly"	James Burrows	Adam Barr	January 10, 2002	64412	18.35
Grace and Will run into Will's father's mistress, Tina, who is lamenting the state of her affair with anyone who will listen. Grace gets the idea to set up Tina with another man to get her away from Will's father, but the guy she gets to go out with Tina backs out at the last minute. Grace and Will quickly sub in their gay friend Larry, who surprisingly charms Tina. Will is excited at how well things are going until Tina starts talking about how awful his father is, at which point Will reflexively defends his dad, reminding Tina of all the reasons she loves him. Tina rejects Larry to go back to Will's dad. Jack and Karen buy a prize stallion to put out to stud, and are surprised when the horse turns out to be gay. Karen decides to put the useless horse up for auction, but at the last minute realizes she loves him and can't give him up.
85	14	"Grace in the Hole"	James Burrows	Bill Wrubel	January 17, 2002	64415	17.60
While visiting Stan in prison, Grace runs into a charming old crush from high school, Glen, who is doing 5 to 10 for real-estate fraud. Grace starts "dating" Glen, but is soon horrified to discover that he's two-timing her. Meanwhile, as a favor to Grace, Will has taken on Glen's appeal, and is excited to actually be litigating. When Grace breaks up with Glen and asks Will to drop the case, Will refuses, and gets Glen off, but then tells Glen to stay away from Grace. Grace ends up proud of Will's performance in court. Rosario is angry with Karen for not visiting Stan in prison enough, and can't believe it when Karen says that prison isn't that bad. Rosario bets Karen and Jack that they can't stay in her room for three days, never mind prison, and Karen takes the bet, promising to visit Stan every day if she loses. Karen and Jack suffer together for three days, and almost win the bet, but two hours away from freedom Karen realizes that if she's had this horrible a three-day stay in Rosario's room, real prison must be awful for Stan, so she loses the bet willingly and goes to visit her husband.
86	15	"Dyeing Is Easy, Comedy Is Hard"	James Burrows	Darlene Hunt	January 31, 2002	64414	19.91
Grace drags Will to her ex-fiance Danny's wedding. Will is annoyed by people's reaction when he tells them he's a lawyer, so he pretends to be a professional tennis player. He thinks his cover is blown when he meets another professional tennis player at the wedding, but the other guy covers for him. When they get a moment in private, the other guy admits he was just pretending too, and he actually works for the IRS. Grace gives a joking speech at the rehearsal dinner about how immature Danny is, and the next day, Danny's fiancée Sarah tells Grace she was right on the money and now Sarah doesn't want to marry Danny either. Grace goes into a long diatribe about how great Danny is to try to convince Sarah not to run, and Grace is so convincing that by the end of it she wants to marry Danny too. Sarah goes through with the ceremony, and when Danny grabs her ass and gives a thumbs up to his friends during the kiss, Grace is reminded why she left him. When Jack lets his son Elliott dye his hair blond, his mom Bonnie (Rosie O'Donnell) tells Jack she doesn't want them to spend time together anymore. Karen kidnaps Elliott from school and takes him to see Jack to cheer him up, but Jack brings Elliott back home. Jack and Bonnie argue, and Jack claims that Bonnie must not like gay people. Bonnie admits that she's gay too, but she just hasn't told Elliott yet and she might have reacted because she's jealous of how easily Jack told Elliott. She tells Jack he can see Elliott again, but warns him that she decides what color his hair will be.
87	16	"A Chorus Lie"	James Burrows	Tracy Poust & Jon Kinnally	February 7, 2002	64418	25.30
Karen brings Will as her date to her annual Valentine's Day party, and when her friend teases her about being alone, she claims that Will is her whore. Will is surprised when so many of Karen's female friends want to be his new "clients," and is horrified when he finds out why. Will ditches Karen and leaves her to dance the final spotlight dance alone, but at the last minute comes back to save her from embarrassment. Jack is in the final auditions for the Gay Men's chorus, and thinks that his toughest competition, Owen (Matt Damon), is straight pretending to be gay. Grace has been lamenting her flirting skills, so Jack enlists her to help him "in" Owen. Grace gives it her best, and finally gets a very straight Owen to make out with her on the couch. Jack fails to get proof, but still tries to tell everyone at rehearsal that Owen is straight. Owen breaks down and admits that yes, he is straight, but the chorale director still lets him join the chorus, partly because he doesn't want to discriminate and partly because Owen is just so cute.
88	17	"Someone Old, Someplace New"	James Burrows	Story by : Jeff Greenstein; Teleplay by : Jhoni Marchinko & Alex Herschlag	February 28, 2002	64416	18.17
Will and Grace decide they want to move to a bigger apartment, and while looking at places they fall in love with a gorgeous apartment that is way out of their price range. They decide that, to afford it, they should sublet their current apartment and gouge the renters to get enough money to afford their new place. They're excited when they find out that their friends, Rob and Ellen, who are expecting their first child, are looking to move back into New York from New Jersey. While making a film about Karen's life for her birthday, Jack finds her mother working as a cocktail waitress in a bar and decides to reunite them on her birthday.
89	18	"Something Borrowed, Someone's Due"	James Burrows	Story by : Kari Lizer; Teleplay by : Bill Wrubel & Adam Barr	March 7, 2002	64417	18.50
Finding their new apartment too big and rambling, Will and Grace try to trick Rob and Ellen into moving out of their old place by pretending that the Upper West Side Slasher is on the loose in their neighborhood. Unfortunately, Ellen not only doesn't fall for it, she goes into labor. With the birth of their son, Rob and Ellen decide they want to move back to New Jersey anyway, and Rob yells at Will for gouging them on the rent. Jack tries to engineer another reunion between Karen and her mother Lois, and Karen tells Lois that she still resents her for all the scams she was forced to pull as a child. Lois and Karen start to reconcile, but then Lois tells Karen there's one more con she'd like to pull, and she needs Karen to do it. Karen goes along with it, because she can't say no to her mother, and ends up at the same hospital where Ellen is giving birth, helping her mother try to scam and dying rich man out of his estate. Karen is humiliated in front of her friends when they catch her dressed up like a poor, stupid ex-cheerleader, and her mother's scam is busted anyway when the old man's daughter gets a restraining order.
90	19	"Cheatin' Trouble Blues"	James Burrows	Alex Herschlag	March 28, 2002	64422	15.31
Will takes his parents to the Rainbow Room for their anniversary and is pleased to see how well they're getting along. Will assumes that his father has dropped his mistress, and excitedly presents his parents with their gift: a cruise for two. Will is crushed when, in a moment alone, his father asks if the cruise is fully booked or if he could bring his "buddy" Tina along, and Grace is horrified when Will's mother confides to her that she wants to bring a "buddy" of her own. Against Grace's advice, Will confronts his parents with their dual affairs, and his parents decide to separate. Will gloomily contemplates going on the cruise with Grace. Meanwhile, due to Karen's phobia of the Rainbow Room elevator, she and Jack take the stairs to the skytop restaurant while hefting the anniversary cake.
91	20	"Went to a Garden Potty"	James Burrows	Story by : Sally Bradford; Teleplay by : Tracy Poust & Jon Kinnally	April 4, 2002	64423	16.14
In the aftermath of his parents' divorce, Will salvages a beloved garden gnome and proudly plants the childhood relic in his apartment's community garden area until Grace accidentally breaks it and blames someone else. Karen casts Jack in a mattress commercial and Jack plays straight so well he's afraid he may get type-cast and ruin his career as a gay actor.
92	21	"He Shoots, They Snore"	James Burrows	Sally Bradford	April 11, 2002	64419	16.30
Jack is upset when Will takes Elliot to a basketball tournament in Connecticut and counsels him on what his first kiss means. Jack feels cheated out of a fatherly moment, but later on in the tournament Jack gets to help Elliot get over losing the game for his team. Meanwhile, Will becomes friends with three beefy dads who are fascinated to get to know a gay man. Grace teaches an interior design seminar at The New School and is a big boring flop. She gets her students to come back for a second day by promising them that they'll get to visit a famous person's apartment, and then tries to intimidate Karen into making her empty promise a reality. Karen tells her she'll get her into Katie Couric's apartment, but then double-crosses her and admits that she doesn't even know Katie Couric. Grace's disappointed students leave for good this time.
93	22	"Wedding Balls"	James Burrows	Laura Kightlinger	April 18, 2002	64420	15.81
Grace gets a little too involved when she helps plan Will's cousin's wedding in New York and starts to see herself as the bride. When she gets to the point where she's trying on the wedding dress, Will intervenes and she gets depressed, thinking she'll never get married herself. Will and Karen start becoming friends when they bond over a book they're both reading for a book club and Jack gets jealous. Will and Karen stage a fight to make Jack feel better.
94	23	"Fagel Attraction"	James Burrows	Jenji Kohan	April 25, 2002	64421	15.67
Will's laptop is stolen from a coffee shop and a friendly detective, Gavin (Michael Douglas), is on the case. Gavin is also a member of Jack's new gay therapy group, and he admits to the group that he's nervous about asking out guys so he makes up stories to spend time with them. He also has a big problem when people have food stuck in their teeth. Gavin tells Will they have to go undercover to a gay club to bust the gay laptop stealing ring, and Will starts to catch on that something strange is going on. When Will runs into Jack who tells him all about Gavin, he then brings Gavin home and purposely gets food stuck in his teeth to wig him out. Will gets Gavin to admit the "undercover" scheme was a ploy to go on a date, and hopes Gavin will ask him out for real, but Gavin runs away because of the stuff still in Will's teeth. Grace's crazy neighbor Val tries to be friends with Grace again, but when Grace isn't interested she tries to become a designer and steal both Grace's ideas and Grace's client.
95	24	"Hocus Focus"	James Burrows	Sally Bradford	May 2, 2002	64424	17.02
At a charity auction, Will wins a photo session with a famous photographer, Fannie Lieber (Glenn Close), and a chance to be in her new book about families. Will brings his family, Grace, to the photo session, and they are shocked when Fannie is curt and rude to them. However, they are even more surprised when Fannie, who has been drug-free for 90 days, disappears behind a curtain for a moment and returns excitable, frantic, and horny. Will and Grace, after a mad posing session, get their picture, and Will hates the way that he looks. They demand a reshoot, but in their second picture, Grace hates the way she looks. They demand another reshoot. Eventually, the photographer accuses them of being too self-obsessed to be truly emotional. This prompts Will to jokingly ask Grace to have a baby with him. The two pause, and the photographer captures the truly conflicted emotions on their faces. Jack's new show is a magic show, but it ends up a disaster when he fights with his lovely assistant, Karen, who steals the show.
96	25	"A Buncha White Chicks Sittin' Around Talkin'"	James Burrows	David Kohan & Max Mutchnick	May 9, 2002	64425	18.13
Will, Grace, Karen, and Jack decide to do the things they've most wanted to do but have been afraid to attempt. Karen tries to have a conjugal visit with Stan, but Stan is busted insider trading from jail and their visit is cancelled. Karen warns Stan that she's not sure how much longer she can put up with being married a to a jail-bird, particularly now that his sentence has been lengthened. Jack tries to audition for a Broadway show, but realizes that maybe it's not his calling after all. Will tells Grace he wants to have a baby with her, but Grace thinks she might want to wait for Mr. Right. When they go see a therapist together to work things out, Grace can't help but be tempted by Will's description of what their child could be like. They decide to go for it.
97	26	"A.I.: Artificial Insemination"	James Burrows	Story by : Kari Lizer & Jhoni Marchinko; Teleplay by : Adam Barr & Jeff Greenstein & Alex Herschlag	May 16, 2002	64426-64427	23.65
98	27	"A.I.: Artificial Insemination"	James Burrows	Story by : Kari Lizer & Jhoni Marchinko; Teleplay by : Adam Barr & Jeff Greenstein & Alex Herschlag	May 16, 2002	64426-64427	23.65
Will and Grace decide to use artificial insemination to get pregnant, but they misplace the sperm sample and are disappointed that they'll have to wait. They decide to try the old-fashioned way, and Karen gets them an expensive hotel room, but they can't bring themselves to actually have sex. They give artificial insemination one last try, but Grace has an accident in the park and a man on a white horse comes to her rescue. Karen is tempted when a rich and charming man comes on to her and gives her the key to his hotel room. Jack, giving up on being an actor, decides to dedicate himself to retail and his job at Barney's, and is rewarded with a promotion to floor manager. However, while celebrating in his new office, he knocks himself out and has a vision of Cher who urges him to go back to performing. Jack wakes up and races to make a voice-over audition that he was going to ignore.

== Awards and nominations ==
=== Emmy Awards ===
Will & Grace earned 13 Primetime Emmy Awards nominations in the summer of 2002 and won two awards.

Award	Category	Nominee	Result
54th Primetime Emmy Awards	Outstanding Comedy Series	Producers of the Series	Nominated
54th Primetime Emmy Awards	Outstanding Directing for a Comedy Series	James Burrows	Nominated
54th Primetime Emmy Awards	Outstanding Lead Actress in a Comedy Series	Debra Messing	Nominated
54th Primetime Emmy Awards	Outstanding Supporting Actor in a Comedy Series	Sean Hayes	Nominated
54th Primetime Emmy Awards	Outstanding Supporting Actress in a Comedy Series	Megan Mullally	Nominated
54th Primetime Emmy Awards	Outstanding Guest Actor in a Comedy Series	Michael Douglas	Nominated
54th Primetime Emmy Awards	Outstanding Guest Actress in a Comedy Series	Glenn Close	Nominated
54th Primetime Emmy Awards	Outstanding Art Direction for a Multi-Camera Series	Melinda Ritz & Glenda Rovello	Won
54th Primetime Emmy Awards	Outstanding Casting for a Comedy Series	Tracy Lilienfield	Nominated
54th Primetime Emmy Awards	Outstanding Cinematography for a Multi-Camera Series	Tony Askins	Won
54th Primetime Emmy Awards	Outstanding Costumes for a Series	Lori Eskowitz-Carter & Mary Walbridge	Nominated
54th Primetime Emmy Awards	Outstanding Multi-Camera Picture Editing for a Series	Peter Chakos	Nominated
54th Primetime Emmy Awards	Outstanding Multi-Camera Sound Mixing for a Series or Special	Peter Damski, Todd Grace & Craig Porter	Nominated
