= Sidewinder 1 =

1977 film by Earl Bellamy

- Theatrical release poster
- Directed by: Earl Bellamy
- Written by: Nancy Voyles Crawford; Thomas A. McMahon
- Produced by: Elmo Williams
- Starring: Marjoe Gortner; Michael Parks; Susan Howard; Alex Cord; Charlotte Rae; Barry Livingston
- Cinematography: Dennis Dalzell
- Edited by: Frank B. Bracht
- Music by: Mundell Lowe
- Production company: Ibex Films
- Distributed by: AVCO Embassy Pictures
- Release date: September 21, 1977
- Running time: 96 minutes
- Country: United States
- Language: English

Sidewinder 1 is a 1977 American action film directed by Earl Bellamy and written by Nancy Voyles Crawford and Thomas A. McMahon. The film stars Marjoe Gortner, Michael Parks, Susan Howard, Alex Cord, Charlotte Rae and Barry Livingston. The film was released on September 21, 1977, by AVCO Embassy Pictures.

== Plot ==
Aging motorcycle racer J.W. Wyatt is approached by rich industrialist and racing enthusiast Packard Gentry to endorse his own custom-designed cycle, the Sidewinder 1. Wyatt brings in a team, including young and reckless Digger, to test and augment the prototype bike. When Gentry dies in a motocross accident, Wyatt must persuade Gentry's unenthusiastic and corporate-minded sister Chris to continue backing the project.

== Cast ==
- Marjoe Gortner as Digger
- Michael Parks as J.W. Wyatt
- Susan Howard as Chris Gentry
- Alex Cord as Packard Gentry
- Charlotte Rae as Mrs. Holt
- Barry Livingston as Willie Holt
- Bill Vint as Jerry Fleming
- Byron Morrow as Gentry Executive
