= Will & Grace season 5 =

Will & Grace
- Season 5
- American DVD cover
- No. of episodes: 24

Release
- Original network: NBC
- Original release: September 26, 2002 – May 15, 2003

Season chronology
- ← Previous; Season 4 Next → Season 6

The fifth season of Will & Grace premiered on September 26, 2002, and concluded on May 15, 2003. It consisted of 24 episodes, including the series' 100th episode.

== Cast and characters ==
=== Main cast ===
- Eric McCormack as Will Truman
- Debra Messing as Grace Adler
- Megan Mullally as Karen Walker
- Sean Hayes as Jack McFarland
- Shelley Morrison as Rosario Salazar

=== Recurring cast ===
- Harry Connick Jr. as Dr. Marvin "Leo" Markus
- Tim Bagley as Larry
- Jerry Levine as Joe
- Tom Gallop as Rob
- Leigh-Allyn Baker as Ellen
- Michael Angarano as Elliott
- Minnie Driver as Lorraine Finster
- Leslie Jordan as Beverley Leslie
- Marshall Manesh as Mr. Zamir

=== Special guest stars ===
- Rip Torn as Lionel Banks
- Kevin Bacon as himself
- Gene Wilder as Mr. Stein
- Eileen Brennan as Zandra
- Tom Skerritt as Dr. Jay Markus
- Judith Ivey as Eleanor Markus
- Debbie Reynolds as Bobbi Adler
- Katie Couric as herself
- Elton John as himself
- Andy Garcia as Milo
- Seth MacFarlane as Pencil Sharpener (voice)
- Demi Moore as Sissy Palmer-Ginsburg
- Madonna as Liz
- Macaulay Culkin as Jason Towne
- Nicollette Sheridan as Dr. Danielle Morty

=== Guest stars ===
- Laura Kightlinger as Nurse Sheila
- Mary Beth McDonough as Mom
- Reginald VelJohnson as Dr. Kaplan
- Jason Marsden as Kim
- Emily Rutherfurd as Joanne
- Ethan Sandler as Doctor
- Matthew Glave as Kirk
- Dan Futterman as Barry
- Rosanna Arquette as Julie
- Kathleen Wilhoite as Sally
- Bruno Campos as Anton
- Steven W. Bailey as Vin
- Clark Gregg as Cameron
- Jamie Kaler as Gary

== Episodes ==
No. overall	No. in season	Title	Directed by	Written by	Original release date	Prod. code	U.S. viewers (millions)
99	1	"...And the Horse He Rode in On"	James Burrows	Adam Barr	September 26, 2002	5002	21.45
Grace is rescued by a cute and charming Jewish doctor named Leo Markus. Leo takes Grace to the clinic on horseback and she is inseminated with Will's sperm. Will and Grace make a pact to not date other people for a while. Grace runs into Leo again and he pesters her to go out with him, but she tells him she's off the market. Leo stops by the apartment to drop off Grace's wallet that she lost and Will gets jealous, scaring off Leo and accusing Grace of dating him. It turns out Will is just feeling guilty because he kissed a guy the other night at a club. Grace finds Leo's card in her wallet with a request "from his horse" to call. Karen fools around with Lionel Banks and then decides to go for it and go all the way, but she gets a surprise when Stan shows up at her room instead.
100	2	"Bacon and Eggs"	James Burrows	Alex Herschlag	October 3, 2002	5001	20.64
Grace takes a pregnancy test and she and Will are disappointed when it comes out negative, but plan to try again in two weeks. Leo hunts Grace down at her office and continues to pursue her. Grace pushes him away because of her promise to Will. Karen sends Rosario to break up with Lionel for her, but Rosario is seduced by him as well. Karen finally gets up the nerve to break up with Lionel herself, and then Rosario comes back for round two. Jack stalks Kevin Bacon, and then accidentally gets hired as his assistant. Jack is sad when he finds out being Kevin's assistant doesn't mean he gets to dance with him, it actually means he has to hunt down his stalker. Jack brings Will stalking with him next time, and Kevin busts them. Jack fingers Will as the stalker and runs. It turns out that Kevin is actually excited to meet his stalker, because having a stalker means his career isn't dead. Jack is horrified when he finds Kevin and Will dancing together. Grace finally gives in and calls Leo, leaving a message on his machine for him to call her.
101	3	"The Kid Stays Out of the Picture"	James Burrows	Jhoni Marchinko	October 10, 2002	5003	20.19
Grace has an incredible date with Leo and they share an incredible kiss. Meanwhile, Will is just getting more and more excited about having a baby. When Grace doesn't seem as excited as he is about his mother sending over his baby crib, he decides to get her a present and offer to take the pressure off. In the meantime, Grace wants to see how things with Leo will work out and wants a little more time before the next insemination, which is supposed to be tomorrow. They both get each other presents and have a heart-to-heart talk, in which they agree to wait another month before trying again. Grace, however, doesn't tell Will that Leo is the real reason she wants to wait. Will finds out about Leo through a present-returning snafu and confronts Grace. He demands that she either get inseminated tomorrow or they won't do it at all. She says then they won't do it at all, and accuses Will of not wanting her to be happy. Will tells her to move out of their apartment.
102	4	"Humongous Growth"	James Burrows	Kari Lizer	October 17, 2002	5004	19.54
Jack and Karen convince Will and Grace to attend Joe and Larry's daughter's birthday party to get the old friends in the same room together. Once there, Will and Grace each try to ensure that Joe and Larry will stay their friends, finally destroying the birthday cake in their competition. Jack and Karen lock Will and Grace in the bouncy castle, where they finally have it out, and Will admits that he hopes Leo is right for Grace, and he should probably wait to have a baby until he's found a life-partner with whom to raise it. Will and Grace reconcile.
103	5	"It's the Gay Pumpkin, Charlie Brown"	James Burrows	Gary Janetti	October 31, 2002	5005	17.21
Leo convinces Will and Grace to go biking up in the Catskills and get a pumpkin for Halloween. Leo even set Will up with a friend of his, but Will is turned off when it turns out his date, Kim is less than five feet tall. Grace tries to get into the outdoorsiness, but can't fake it anymore when she is covered in mud and it starts to rain on her. Will is a grump for the entire trip, but surprisingly hits it off with Kim. Karen starts feeling guilty about her almost affair and decides to tell Stanley about it, but when she goes to talk to him, she finds out that he's having an affair. Karen leaves Stanley. Jack starts a café outside his apartment in the building hallway.
104	6	"Boardroom and a Parked Place"	James Burrows	Gail Lerner	November 7, 2002	5007	21.40
Karen, who has left Stan and been cut off financially, is living with Rosario in her limo. Jack and Grace try to persuade her to move in with them, but she refuses. Finally, after enjoying Grace's pulsating shower-head, she agrees, but just then her financial worries go away and instead, Grace and Jack go with Karen to enjoy her luxurious hotel room. Will tries to help out his new boss, Mr. Stein (Gene Wilder), who admits that he's a bit crazy. Will helps Stein with the everyday tasks of running the law firm, and in return, Stein gives him perks promised to other and even fires one of the firm's favorite elderly lawyers to give Will her coveted corner office. Will's co-workers hate him, so Will tries to bolster up Stein's confidence so that Stein will be able to function on his own.
105	7	"The Needle and the Omelet's Done"	James Burrows	Tracy Poust & Jon Kinnally	November 14, 2002	5006	19.09
Grace goes to brunch at the Plaza with Leo and they meet up with some "friends" of his. When she finds out later that he tricked her and she's actually met his parents, she regrets her earlier casual attitude. As they fight over his lying to her, he admits that he only tricked her because he loves her and he really wanted her to meet his parents. She admits she loves him too and they make up. Will gets Botox with Karen. Zandra tells Jack that he's a terrible actor, so Jack accuses Zandra of being a terrible teacher. Zandra lets him teach a class, and Jack makes acting all about "attracting". Zandra tells him he's also a terrible teacher, so he storms out of the class, actually taking two students with him.
106	8	"Marry Me a Little, Marry Me a Little More"	James Burrows	Jeff Greenstein & Bill Wrubel	November 21, 2002	5008	24.26
107	9	"Marry Me a Little, Marry Me a Little More"	James Burrows	Jeff Greenstein & Bill Wrubel	November 21, 2002	5009	24.26
Grace and Leo run into Katie Couric in Central Park during a Today Show sweeps gimmick and end up being one of many couples that get married in a mass wedding. Will is upset when he finds out that his dream of being at Grace's wedding has been usurped, so they have a reception so that he can give his dream toast. At the reception, Grace realizes that she and Leo don't really know each other that well, and she starts to have second thoughts. When Katie Couric makes a second appearance and tells them that it turns out their marriage wasn't valid, Grace thinks maybe that's okay. Luckily, she second-guesses herself again and decides that she and Leo should get married again, and this time do it right. Will puts together a dream wedding for Grace in a very short time, but when Grace's father throws his back out and Grace asks her best friend to walk her down the aisle, Will refuses. Grace assures him that he's not going to lose her as a friend, and finally Will gives her away to Leo. NOTE: This episode is billed as the 100th episode but aired as 106 and 107; it was, however, on the 100th original airing date.
108	10	"The Honeymoon's Over"	James Burrows	Sally Bradford	December 5, 2002	5010	19.32
After a displaced Karen is booted from her Plaza Hotel digs, a sympathetic Will agrees to let her move in with him—at least until she turns his apartment into a federal disaster zone with her exorbitant lifestyle, forcing Will to try to unload her onto Grace's shoulders. Meanwhile, Jack loses style points when he poses incognito out of fear that the "Gay Mafia" has it out for him. Grammy-winning superstar Elton John plays himself as an omniscient "Gay Mafia" figurehead.
109	11	"All About Christmas Eve"	James Burrows	Adam Barr	December 12, 2002	5011	16.21
Grace and Leo plan on spending Christmas Eve at The Nutcracker, while Will accepts an offer to spend Christmas Eve lounging in a bathrobe with Jack and Karen at the Palace Hotel. At the last minute, Leo gets beeped and has to go into the hospital, so Grace invites Will to join her. Will, who has always loved the Nutcracker, can't say no, but when Leo shows up at the last minute he gracefully bows out so that Grace can spend Christmas Eve with her husband. Will joins Karen and Jack back at the hotel caroling the service people at the hotel, and Grace and Leo try to enjoy hot buttered rum before the show starts, but Leo gets beeped again. Grace drags Will back to the theater, but Leo shows up again just before they go inside. Grace makes the difficult decision of taking Will with her to the show, but it turns out that neither Will nor Leo really wants to watch dancing toys, so they both end up ditching her. Eventually Grace and Leo join the others at the hotel, caroling the service people.
110	12	"Field of Queens"	James Burrows	Katie Palmer	January 9, 2003	5012	16.25
Karen goes on a date with a charming and handsome restaurant owner, Milo (Andy García), but starts to get a little uneasy when he says he's going to call her and then doesn't for three days. Grace goes to give Milo a piece of her mind, and is shocked when he admits to being a playboy and says that he lied to Karen to make her feel better, but she's too old for him. Grace tries to give Karen the news gently. Jack talks Will into joining a gay soccer team, under the assumption that it will be like a "gay bar on astroturf", but when the team turns out to be serious about the game, Will decides to quit because he's terrible at soccer. Jack is upset when Elliot decides to quit his own soccer team because he's so bad at the game, so Will decides to stick with it to be a role model for Elliot. Elliot quits his team anyway, and Will actually has to get off the bench and play when one of his teammates is injured during a game. In a total fluke, while trying to run away from the ball, Will slips and, while falling, kicks the ball backwards into the goal, scoring the winning point for his team.
111	13	"Fagmalion; Parts I & II"	James Burrows	Tracy Poust & Jon Kinnally	January 16, 2003	5013	15.97
112	14	"Fagmalion; Parts I & II"	James Burrows	Gary Janetti	January 30, 2003	5014	15.77
Part I: "Gay It Forward" — Grace moves into Leo's apartment in Brooklyn and meets a friendly neighbor, Julie. Julie is a massage therapist, and when she gives Grace a free massage, Grace is concerned when she massages a little further south than usual. Grace gets Karen to hire Julie to see if that's a normal part of Julie's massage, and when she finds out that it isn't, she asks Julie about it. Julie assures Grace that it's perfectly normal for girlfriends to be physically friendly with each other, and that's all it was, friendly. Grace is reassured, but thrown off-guard when Julie surprises her again during a hug. Karen sets up Will with her newly out-of-the-closet cousin Barry. Jack tries to fight Will for the opportunity to date Barry, until he sees the man. While Karen encourages the relationship, Will tries to let Barry down easily. Jack tells Will that he should mentor Barry, and teach him how to be a proper gay man. Part II: "Attack of the Clones" – Will and Jack begin their Barry project in earnest, particularly after Karen gives them money to back it. Will works on the mind while Jack works on the body. Will encourages Barry to try to pick someone up at a gay bar, remembering his success the first time he did it. Barry is shot down, and Jack admits that he paid the guy that Will asked out his first time. Barry thinks Jack and Will are too shallow, and since they're still alone, he doesn't think they can teach him anything, but finally he admits that having any kind of help is better than no help at all. Leo tells Grace that he has to make a last-minute month-long trip to Africa for Doctors Without Borders. On the way to the airport, Grace picks a fight, and after Leo goes to get on his plane she regrets it. Grace buys a last-minute plane ticket and gets on Leo's plane, but just as the plane is taking off she finds out that he went home to make up with her.
113	15	"Homojo"	James Burrows	Bill Wrubel	February 6, 2003	5015	16.49
Will and Grace worry that they've lost their mojo (or in their case, their homojo) when they don't seem to have the connection that they used to. Their situation becomes critical when it looks like they might lose at game night with their friends. They have a serious talk and vow to work harder at communicating about the little, trivial things that are so important in their lives, and they get it together just in time to pull a win. Karen has to fight for her queer when Jack becomes entranced by the new woman in Stan's life, a British ex-stripper named Lorraine (guest star Minnie Driver).
114	16	"Women and Children First"	James Burrows	Laura Kightlinger	February 13, 2003	5017	18.71
Grace hosts girls' night at her apartment, looking forward to Leo returning soon, but Leo calls and says that he'll be staying longer than he originally planned. Grace says that's okay, and asks all her female friends, except Karen, if that was the right thing to do. All the other unhappy women say that sounds fine, but Karen says Grace should tell Leo she's upset, but then stomps out, angry that Grace didn't want her opinion. Grace calls Leo and tells him that she's upset and they need to make these decisions together, and Karen comes back and she and Grace reconcile. Jack runs into his old babysitter (Demi Moore), Sissy, and hires her to be his babysitter again. Will is disgusted by the strange relationship between Jack and Sissy, and urges Jack to end things, but what finally convinces Jack to get rid of Sissy is when he finds out how much she costs.
115	17	"Fagmalion; Part III & IV"	James Burrows	Alex Herschlag	February 20, 2003	5016	16.41
116	18	"Fagmalion; Part III & IV"	James Burrows	Gail Lerner	March 13, 2003	5018	15.01
Part III: "Bye, Bye, Beardy" — Will and Jack's transformation of Karen's schlubby cousin Barry is complete, and the whole gang gussies up to attend the gay gala of the year. Will suddenly realizes that he's attracted to Barry, but just before he gets up the nerve to ask him out, clueless Jack beats him to the punch. Karen spars with her old "friend", Beverly Leslie, who is out for blood now that Karen has been dumped by Stan. Part IV: "The Guy Who Loved Me" – Will and Jack, now both infatuated with Barry, make Barry choose between them, and Barry chooses Will. Will has a week of great dates with Barry, and finally gets Jack to forgive him by telling Jack that he looks older when he's angry. Will asks Barry to be exclusive, but Barry says he wants to play the field for a while since he just came out. Karen impersonates a maid when a hot maintenance man at her hotel mistakes her for one. They start a passionate love affair, and Karen finally admits that she's not really a maid, she's actually rich. Karen is excited when her poor maintenance man says he can still love her even though she's not poor like he is, but when she finds out that he doesn't drink she calls the whole thing off.
117	19	"Sex, Losers, and Videotape"	James Burrows	Steve Gabriel	April 3, 2003	5019	15.04
A lovesick Will mourns the loss of Barry and forms a lonely hearts club with Karen and his crazy boss, Mr. Stein. Unfortunately, the club comes to a screeching halt when Karen and Mr. Stein hook up. Grace tries to make a sexy videotape for Leo, but turns to Jack for acting help when she realizes that she's more silly than sexy. Jack finds that the best solution is to tape Grace in the shower when she doesn't know about it so she acts natural.
118	20	"Leo Unwrapped"	James Burrows	Sonja Warfield	April 17, 2003	5020	14.69
For Grace's birthday, Will flies in Leo as a surprise, but when Leo arrives a day early Will tries to hide him away to preserve the surprise for the day of Grace's actual birthday. Leo gets fed up and goes back to his apartment to freshen up, but he runs into Grace there and they have a happy reunion. When Grace finds out what Will went through to surprise her, she tells Leo that they have to pretend they didn't see each other, but when Leo sees Will, he can't keep his mouth shut. Will decides that he and Leo shouldn't tell Grace that Will knows that she's not going to be surprised, while Karen and Jack try to support both pretenses.
119	21	"Dolls and Dolls"	James Burrows	Kari Lizer	April 24, 2003	5022	17.71
Karen decides to get a taste of "real life" and moves in with a woman named Liz (guest star Madonna). She and Liz get along fabulously until they go out clubbing and set their sights on the same guy. Liz tries to kick Karen out of the apartment, but Karen realizes that she actually owns the whole building, so she kicks Liz out instead. Will falls off his clogs and sprains his ankles. When Will starts enjoying his painkillers a little too much, Grace and Jack stage an intervention.
120	22	"May Divorce Be with You"	James Burrows	Sally Bradford	May 1, 2003	5021	17.15
When Karen finds out that Will is representing Stan in the divorce, she hires her own hotshot attorney, Jason Towne. Will worries about Karen's judgment when Jason turns out to be a young snot-nosed kid that doesn't know pro bono from a fidelity clause. Will tries to help Jason, and then advises Karen to get a new lawyer, but when Karen confronts Jason it turns out that he's not as bumbling as he seemed, that it was all an act to make Will slip up. Jack brings in a new client for Grace, his latest boyfriend, Cam. Not only is Cam rich, but Grace loves his taste in home decor, and when Cam dumps Jack the next day, Grace is loath to give into Jack's demands and drop Cam as a client. Grace goes to tell Cam she can't work for him anymore, but Cam talks her into remodeling his enormous country house instead. Jack busts them and Grace finally quits entirely, valuing her friendship with Jack too much to betray him. Then, of course, Jack gets back together with Cam. Macaulay Culkin and Clark Gregg guest-star.
121	23	"23"	James Burrows	Adam Barr & Jeff Greenstein & Gary Janetti & Sally Bradford & Alex Herschlag	May 8, 2003	5023	17.10
As the divorce proceedings continue, Karen suddenly finds out that Stan has died. Karen and all her friends attend the funeral, as does Stan's mistress Lorraine (Minnie Driver), who was under him at the time of his death and was trapped under his body for two days. A number of people speak fondly of Stan at his funeral, but everyone is really just waiting for the reading of the will. Rosario finds out that she gets $10 million if she works for Karen for another 20 years. Grace gets a painting of Karen. Apparently, Stan thought Will and Jack were a couple, and leaves them $20,000 to get married. Finally, Karen finds out that she gets the bulk of Stan's estate, and Lorraine is left with nothing. Leo gets invited to Guatemala to help set up a new Doctors Without Borders clinic, and asks Grace to come with him. Grace happily accepts his offer, even though she really doesn't know where Guatemala is.
122	24	"24"	James Burrows	Gail Lerner & Kari Lizer & Jhoni Marchinko & Tracy Poust & Jon Kinnally & Bill Wrubel	May 15, 2003	5024	20.28
Grace gets more and more depressed about going to Guatemala with Leo, especially when Will and Jack plan to accompany Karen on her yacht to the Caribbean Sea to scatter Stan's ashes. Leo tells Grace she can go on the yacht instead of to a third-world country with him, and she celebrates until she sees the hot blonde doctor that will be going with Leo. On the yacht after Leo's departure, Grace convinces herself that he would never cheat on her, but becomes more concerned when she discovers a letter from hot doctor Danielle to her husband saying that she wants him. Grace orders the yacht to Guatemala. Karen, while scattering Stan's ashes, discovers that his mistress Lorraine (Minnie Driver) has stowed away on the boat. The two women actually start to get along, until Lorraine asks Karen for some of Stan's money. In the fight that ensues, Lorraine pushes Karen overboard and Rosario jumps in after her to save her. Karen and Rosario end up being rescued by a Russian barge that is delivering thousands of cases of Stolichnaya vodka. Will and Jack thoroughly enjoy their tropical vacation, and also enjoy a few too many tropical drinks. They are both horrified when they wake up in the same bed. Nicollette Sheridan guest-stars.
