= Barry Livingston =

American actor (born 1953)

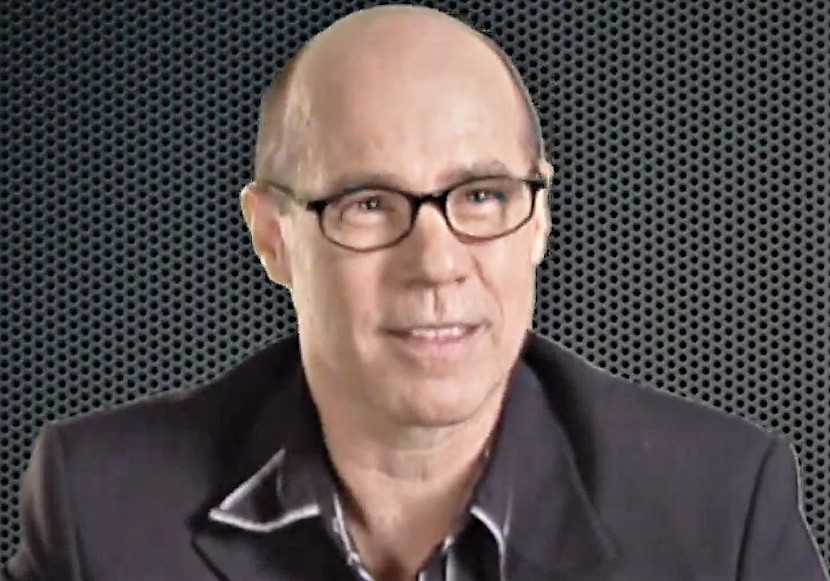
- Livingston in 2020
- Born: Barry Gordon Livingston; December 17, 1953 (age 72); Los Angeles, California, U.S.
- Occupation: Actor
- Spouse: Karen Huntsman (m. 1983)
- Children: 2

Barry Gordon Livingston (born December 17, 1953) is an American television and film actor, known for his role as Ernie Douglas on the television series My Three Sons (1963–72). He is the younger brother of actor/director Stanley Livingston, who played Ernie's older brother "Chip" on the show.

== Life and career ==
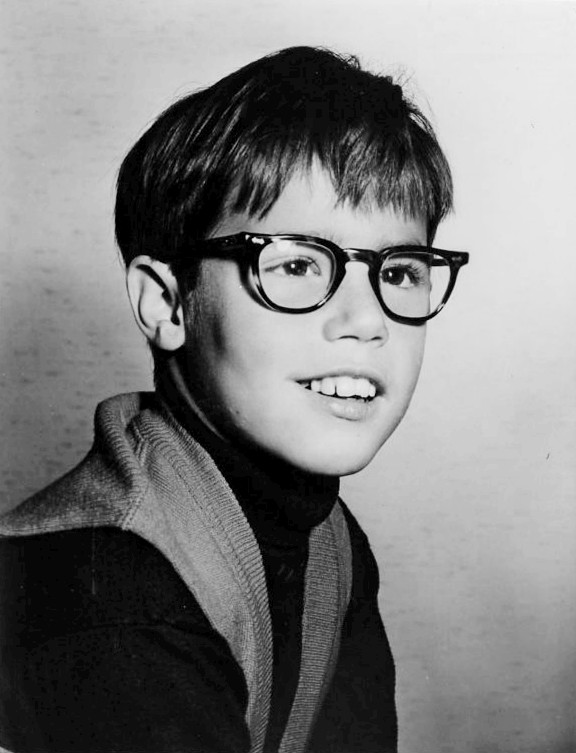
Livingston in 1963

Livingston was born in Los Angeles, California, the son of Lillian Rochelle Palyash and Hilliard Livingston.

He began his career as a child actor in the late 1950s. He considers his film debut a role he won as one of the sons of Paul Newman in the film Rally 'Round the Flag, Boys! (1958) with his older brother Stanley who, by this time, was already working as a child actor. He was let go from the film when he was told that he needed to get glasses to successfully correct his astigmatism. His first professional onscreen appearance was in a small, uncredited role in the 1961 film The Errand Boy, followed by roles as Barry, a neighborhood kid, in The Adventures of Ozzie & Harriet; on The Dick Van Dyke Show; and as "Arnold Mooney", son of banker Theodore J. Mooney portrayed by Gale Gordon, on The Lucy Show. In 1962, he appeared as one of the six children adopted by Debbie Reynolds in the film My Six Loves. In 1963, he joined the cast of the ABC sitcom My Three Sons as next door neighbor Ernie Thompson.

His older brother, Stanley Livingston, was already a series regular as Chip Douglas. After Tim Considine left the series two years later, Livingston joined the cast permanently (his character was adopted into the family, keeping the show's title intact) and remained with the series until its end in 1972. In 1964, at the age of ten, he appeared in the ABC medical drama about psychiatry, Breaking Point in the episode titled "A Land More Cruel".

After My Three Sons ended in 1972, Livingston landed roles in Room 222 and The Streets of San Francisco. He appeared on the stage as Linus in You're a Good Man Charlie Brown, which he reprised when the musical was adapted for television in 1973. Throughout the 1970s and 1980s, he continued to work steadily in films, made-for-TV movies and episodic television including Police Woman, Sidewinder 1, Simon & Simon, and 1st & Ten. He also appeared throughout the country in stage plays, including Broadway and off-Broadway. In 1974 he appeared in Sons and Daughters, a short-lived CBS series.

In 2007, he appeared in Zodiac. He had a major role in the Hallmark Channel movie Final Approach. He has also appeared in You Don't Mess with the Zohan (2008), The Social Network (2010), Horrible Bosses (2011), and War Dogs (2016).

In October 2011, Barry Livingston released his anecdote-filled autobiography, The Importance of Being Ernie -- detailing his career from My Three Sons to Mad Men and beyond. He most recently appeared on television in episodes of Mad Men, The New Adventures of Old Christine, Two and a Half Men, and Anger Management. Barry Livingston is the only cast member of My Three Sons to still have an active Screen Actors Guild Card.

== Select filmography ==
=== Film ===
Year	Title	Role
1962	My Six Loves	Sherman Smith
1972	Peege	Damion
1977	Sidewinder 1	Willie Holt
1987	Masters of the Universe	Charlie
1989	Easy Wheels	Reporter
1992	The Nutt House	Williams
1993	Maniac Cop III: Badge of Silence	Asst. Coroner
1997	Invisible Mom	Professor Karl Griffin
2000	Little Man on Campus	Barry
2001	Tremors 3: Back to Perfection	Dr. Andrew Merliss
2004	First Daughter	Press Secretary
2007	Zodiac	Copy Editor #3
2008	You Don't Mess with the Zohan	Gray Kleibolt
2009	Porky's Pimpin' Pee Wee	Uncle Howard
2010	The Social Network	Mr. Cox
2011	Hostel: Part III	Doctor
2012	Argo	David Marmor, CIA official
2014	Jersey Boys	Accountant
2016	War Dogs	Army Bureaucrat
2026	Behemoth!	Musician #5
2026	The Further Mis-Adventures of Cliff Booth	TBA

=== Television ===
Year	Title	Role	Notes
1962	The Dick Van Dyke Show		1 episode
1960–62	The Adventures of Ozzie & Harriet	Barry	8 episodes
1963	Sam Benedict		1 episode
1964	Breaking Point		1 episode
1963–64	The Lucy Show	Arnold Mooney	2 episodes
1966	Vacation Playhouse		1 episode
1969	Dragnet	Horace Thornton	1 episode; credited as "Michael Tanner"
1969	Marcus Welby, M.D.	Bobby	1 episode; credited as "Michael Tanner"
1963–72	My Three Sons	Ernie Thompson/Douglas	Recurring roles
1973	Room 222		1 episode
1973	Ironside		1 episode
1973	You're a Good Man, Charlie Brown		
1973	Thicker Than Water		1 episode
1973	The Streets of San Francisco		1 episode
1974	The Elevator		
1974	Sons and Daughters		
1974	Police Woman		1 episode
1975	Lucas Tanner		1 episode
1983	High School U.S.A.		
1984	Simon & Simon		1 episode
1984	Hart to Hart		1 episode
1985	1st & Ten		1 episode
1990–92	Doogie Howser, M.D.		2 episodes
1994–95	Lois & Clark: The New Adventures of Superman		3 episodes
1996	Boston Common		1 episode
1997	The Nanny		1 episode
1997	Sliders		1 episode
1998	Ally McBeal		1 episode
1998	USA High		1 episode
1998	Beyond Belief: Fact or Fiction		1 episode
1999	Soldier of Fortune, Inc.		1 episode
1999	The Hughleys		1 episode
2000	Judging Amy		1 episode
2000	Zoe, Duncan, Jack and Jane		1 episode
2000	The Huntress		1 episode
2000	Sabrina, the Teenage Witch		1 episode
2001	Boston Public		1 episode
2001	The West Wing		1 episode
2001	All About Us		1 episode
2002	Will & Grace	Vince	Episode: "Fagel Attraction"
2002	Maybe It's Me		1 episode
2002	Roswell		1 episode
2002	Son of the Beach		1 episode
2002	American Dreams		1 episode
2003	The Guardian		1 episode
2004	She Spies		1 episode
2004	The Drew Carey Show		1 episode
2004	Wedding Daze		
2004	Strong Medicine		1 episode
2006	Crossing Jordan		1 episode
2006	Mystery Woman: Wild West		1 episode
2006	Rodney		1 episode
2007	Pandemic		
2007	Final Approach		
2007	Mad Men		1 episode
2008	Eli Stone		1 episode
2008	The New Adventures of Old Christine		1 episode
2008	Two and a Half Men		1 episode
2009	Everybody Hates Chris		1 episode
2009	Monk		1 episode
2009	NCIS		1 episode
2012	CSI: Miami		1 episode
2012	It's Always Sunny in Philadelphia		1 episode
2013	Second Chances	Bill	Hallmark movie
2014	Anger Management		3 episodes
2017	The Middle		1 episode
2017	Angie Tribeca		1 episode
2017	The Orville		1 episode
2018	Bosch		3 episodes
2022	Bosch: Legacy		1 episode
