= Marry Me a Little, Marry Me a Little More =

- Will & Grace episodes
- Scene where Will (Eric McCormack) walks Grace (Debra Messing) down the aisle and hands her to Leo (Harry Connick Jr.).
- Episode nos.: Season 5 Episodes 8 and 9
- Directed by: James Burrows
- Written by: Jeff Greenstein; Bill Wrubel
- Cinematography by: Tony Askins
- Editing by: Peter Chakos
- Production code: 100
- Original air date: November 21, 2002

Guest appearances
- Harry Connick Jr. as Leo Markus; Katie Couric as herself; Judith Ivey as Eleanor Markus; Debbie Reynolds as Bobbi Adler

Episode chronology
← Previous "The Needle and the Omelet's Done"	Next → "The Honeymoon's Over"
- Will & Grace season 5

"Marry Me a Little, Marry Me a Little More" is the eighth and ninth episode of the fifth season of the American television series Will & Grace, and the 106th and the 107th episode overall. It was written by Jeff Greenstein and Bill Wrubel and directed by series producer James Burrows. The episode originally aired on NBC in the United States on November 21, 2002. Guest stars in "Marry Me a Little, Marry Me a Little More" include Harry Connick Jr., Katie Couric, Judith Ivey, and Debbie Reynolds.

The episode focuses on Grace (played by Debra Messing) impulsively accepting a marriage proposal from her boyfriend Leo (Harry Connick, Jr.) despite that the two have only known each other for a short time. They get married and tell their friends about the news, despite Grace's best friend Will's (Eric McCormack) unease about the whole idea. Grace and Leo decide to host a wedding reception for themselves, but at the festivity, Grace learns unsettling details about Leo, which gives her reason to wonder if she has made a mistake.

Before the episode aired, some critics worried that bringing Leo into the storyline would disrupt the friendship between Will and Grace. Co-creator David Kohan, however, believed the two characters had to "move on forward in their lives in some way", and sought to assure the worrying critics that a third individual added to the mix would be unlikely to replace Will as the best friend of Grace. NBC was also in full support of creating a triangle between the three characters, stating that it was a way for the producers to find a new "spark" for the series.

Once the episode aired, it received generally mixed reviews from television critics. Despite this, "Marry Me a Little, Marry Me a Little More" was watched by 24.3 million households in its original airing, according to Nielsen ratings. The episode also garnered Will & Grace's second-largest audience ever among adults aged 18 to 49. The Nation magazine commented that this was the first time that a prime-time sitcom showed a Jewish protagonist (Grace) marrying inside the faith.

== Plot ==
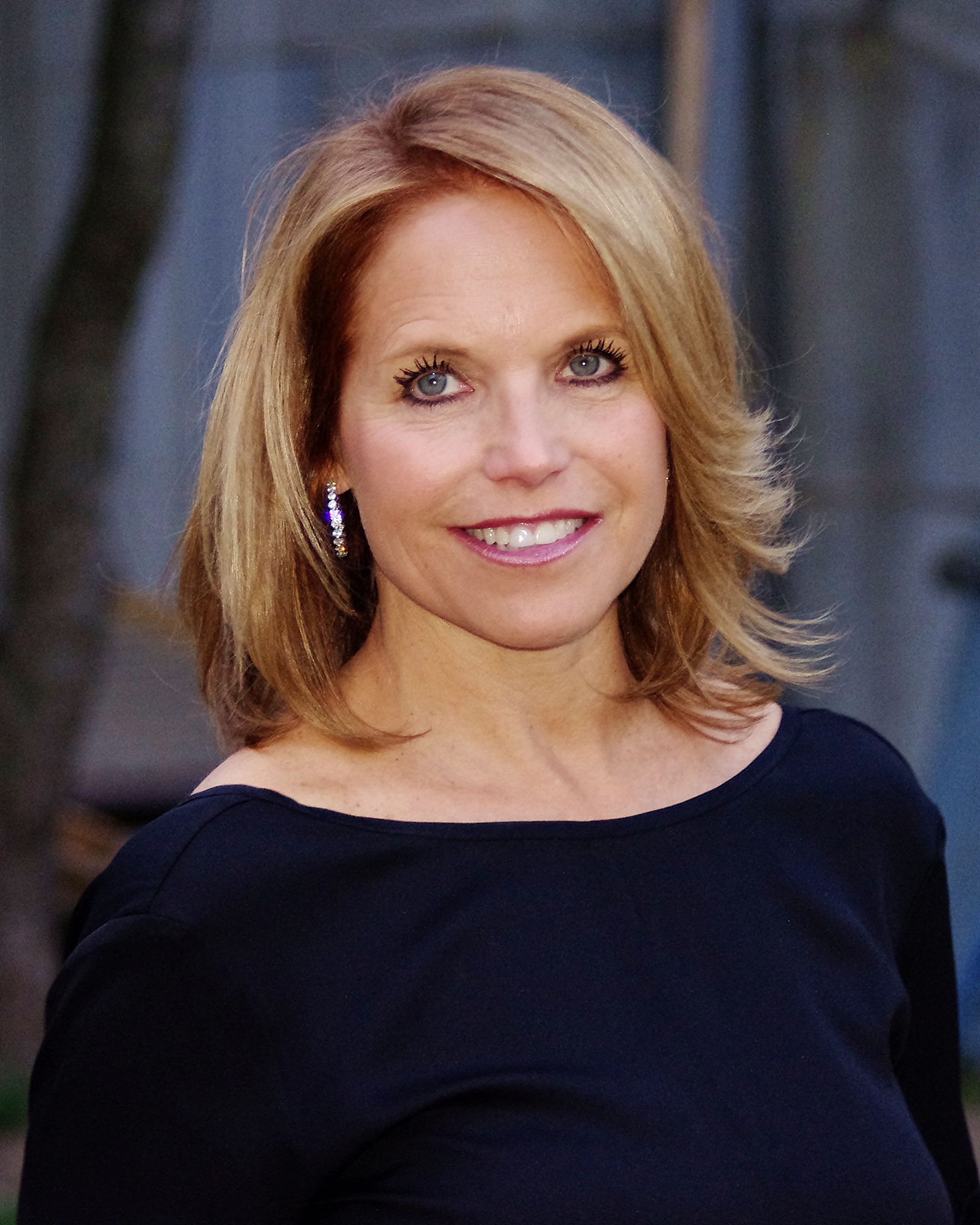
Katie Couric, co-host of The Today Show, appears in the episode.

When Grace (Debra Messing) and her boyfriend Leo (Harry Connick Jr.) take a walk around Central Park, they notice a tent and a van parked nearby, after a bride and groom ran past them. Eager to know what is happening, Grace stops by the van, sees Katie Couric, and asks her what is going on. Katie tells Grace that The Today Show is having massive televised weddings in the park for ratings sweeps week. When Katie asks Grace and Leo if they would like to get married, Leo says yes, but Grace believes he is being sarcastic, only later realizing that he is serious. Leo explains to Grace that because they originally met in a park, they should also get married in a park. Leo proposes and Grace accepts, despite that the two have only known each other for two months.

Upon arriving at Will's (Eric McCormack) apartment, Grace and Leo reveal to their friends, Will, Jack (Sean Hayes), and Karen (Megan Mullally), that they have gotten married. The friends' reactions to the news are not positive; in particular, Grace's gay best friend Will is uneasy about the whole idea. Leo and Grace, however, assure Will that they will have a wedding reception in honor of him, which improves Will's relationship with both Grace and Leo.

During the reception, Grace learns many things she did not know about Leo, including that his first name is Marvin (revealed by his mother, Eleanor (Judith Ivey)). So many unsettling details about Leo come to light that Grace becomes uneasy and leaves the reception; Leo follows her. The two run into Katie in the lobby who tells them that The Today Show has scrapped the wedding segment because the judge who performed the ceremony was not licensed in New York so their marriage is not valid. Upon learning this, Grace tells Leo that she needs time to think about their relationship. Leo returns to the reception and announces to everyone that his marriage to Grace is not legitimate. Grace returns to the reception later, and reveals that she does want to marry Leo.

At the synagogue where Grace and Leo's wedding is to take place, Grace learns from her mother, Bobbi (Debbie Reynolds), that her father will not be able to walk her down the aisle. Grace panics, but Karen suggests that Will should walk with her instead. She agrees and calls upon him. Although Will at first declines to give her away because of the prior argument, they make up and he finally escorts her down the aisle. After the wedding reception, Will, Grace, Leo, Jack, and Karen walk through Central Park enjoying Grace and Leo's marriage.

== Production ==
"Marry Me a Little, Marry Me a Little More" was written by Jeff Greenstein and Bill Wrubel and was directed by series producer James Burrows. It was the one-hundredth episode of Will & Grace, and the producers celebrated the milestone by planning an hour-long episode followed by a clip show featuring highlights and outtakes from past seasons. In an interview with The Jewish Journal in 2001, David Kohan, the co-creator of Will & Grace, in discussing the lead characters, stated that a marriage could be a problem for the dynamic between the two characters: "I'd love for [Grace] to find a Jewish love interest, but that relationship might actually work, and then there'd be no more 'Will & Grace'." Kohan, however, changed his mind by the time of a follow-up interview in 2002: he noted that the characters had to "move on forward in their lives in some way" and it would be unlikely that Grace's possible husband would displace her gay best friend, Will. In July 2002, reports surfaced that a possible wedding involving Grace would happen, but the staff were not allowed to reveal anything.

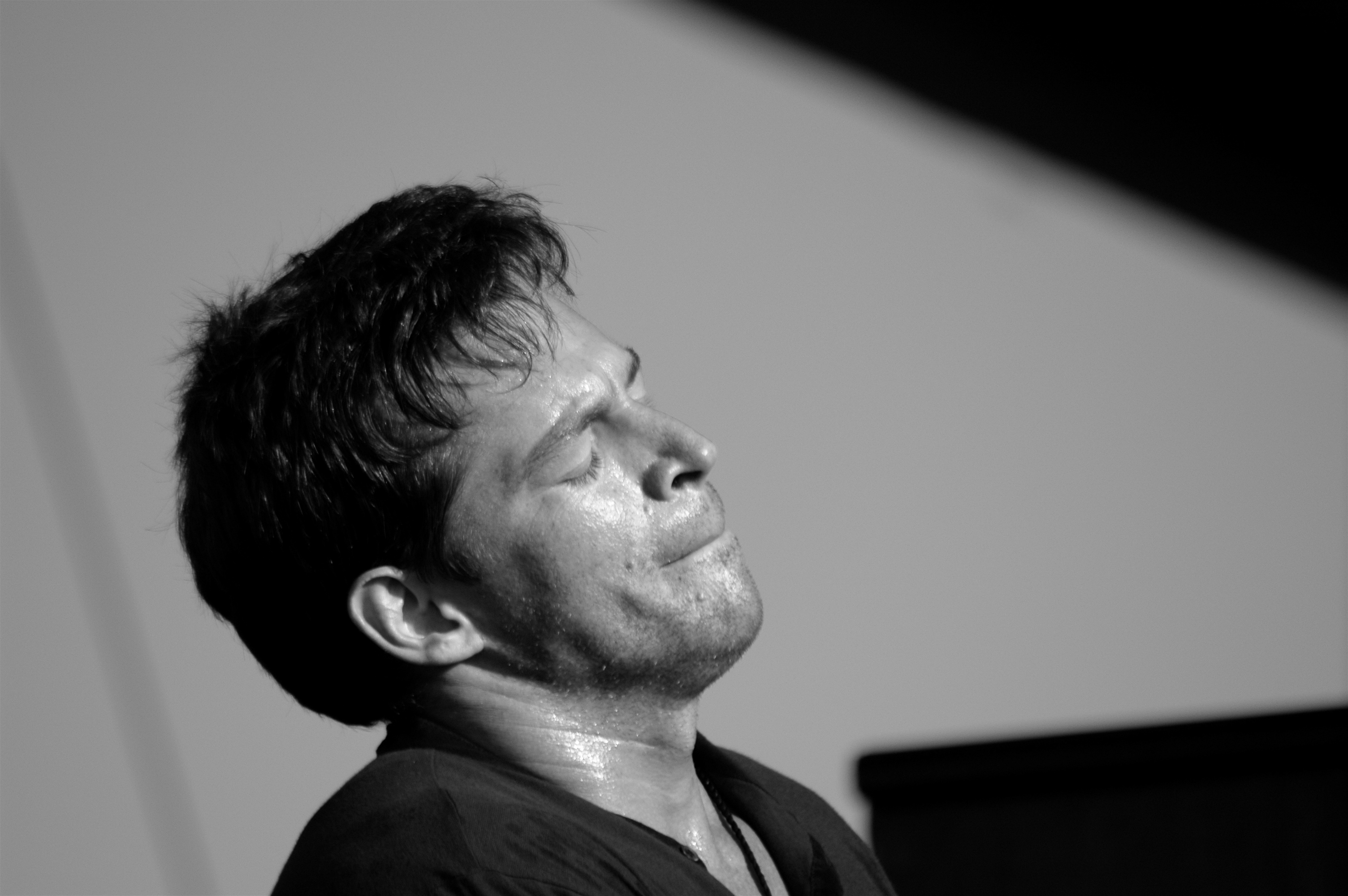
Musician Harry Connick Jr., was cast in the role of Leo.

Musician Harry Connick Jr., was cast in the role of Leo. He received a call from co-creators Kohan and Max Mutchnick asking him to appear on Will & Grace, and agreed to do it after learning that it was his wife's favorite show. According to Debra Messing, who plays Grace, Kohan and Mutchnick had a specific vision of Grace's husband from the start. They thought it was important that Grace meet a "menschy, nice Jewish man who happens to be a hottie, and that's what we got with Harry Connick Jr," she said. According to The Nation magazine, this was the first time that a prime-time sitcom showed a Jewish protagonist (Grace) marrying inside the faith. Connick, who is part-Jewish, said he enjoyed the fact that he was not asked to sing on the show, because "it throws you out of character a little bit when that stuff happens. It's been great just doing the acting thing." Messing, in discussing Grace and Leo's relationship, commented that it is "unlike anything that Grace has ever been a part of before and just the little that we've done so far, it feels wonderful to be playing with Harry." In another interview, also discussing the characters' relationship, she explained, "...bringing Leo into it and making it a viable and potent relationship for Grace, that's never happened before. I think she's a little less frenetic and neurotic, and I think that really being in love markedly changes Grace. That sexual energy in a great way has shaken things up, because it is the greatest threat to the friendship of Will and Grace to date."

Before the Grace and Leo storyline was written, NBC worried that the show's characters never seemed to move forward or mature. They wanted the show to be more like Friends, which received higher ratings because of its romantic storyline cliffhangers. Greenstein commented that "there was an interchangeability among the episodes from season to season. We wanted to create more continuing story arcs; we wanted to deepen the predicaments the characters are in, get the audience kind of rooting for something from week to week." In November 2002, negotiations were made for Connick to play a series regular on Will & Grace; he originally signed on for only 13 episodes. Jeff Zucker, who at the time served as President of NBC Entertainment, commented that creating a triangle between Will, Grace, and Leo was a "brilliant" way to give the series a new spark. He was confident that it would be well received by the audience and the fans.

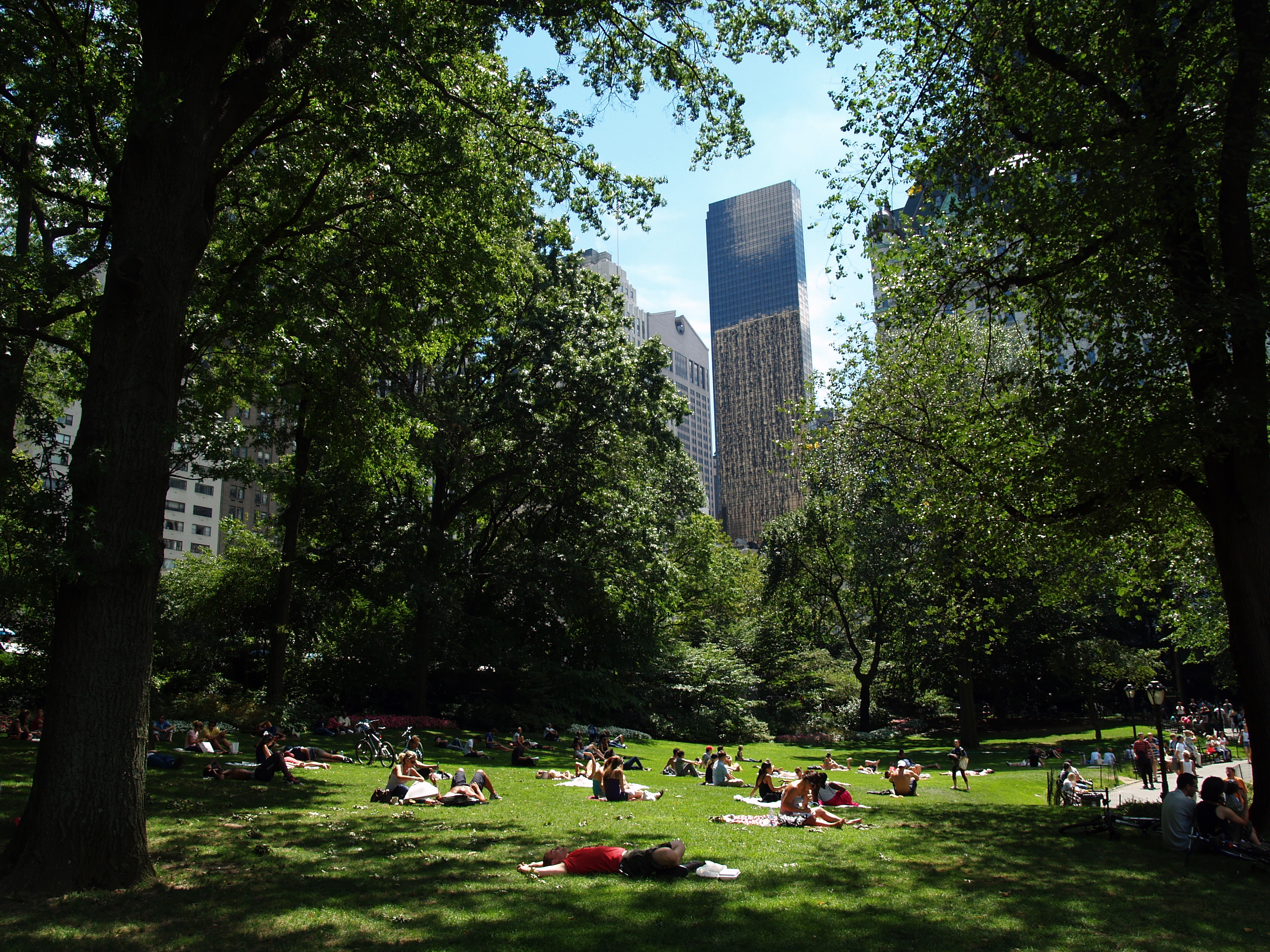
The Central Park scenes were filmed in November 2002.

The episode was filmed over three days at the end of October and beginning of November 2002. It was supposed to take only two days, but the filming of the wedding scenes was postponed after Messing got sick on the first day. On November 3, 2002, the rooftop terrace scene was filmed at the New York Palace Hotel. In November 2002, the scene in Central Park was shot in New York. The wedding ceremony was filmed, in part, at Temple Israel of Hollywood. As the actors performed their lines in front of a studio audience, the writing staff stood behind the cameras taking notes in the script and watching the audience's reaction to jokes. The writers often stopped the cameras and added new inflections to the dialog. According to the Knoxville News Sentinel's Terry Morrow, the cast handled the changes quickly, and scenes were routinely redone up to three times even if the actors executed their lines properly.

Debbie Reynolds and Judith Ivey guest-starred in the episode as the mothers of Grace and Leo, respectively. Reynolds had played Grace's mother in the episode "The Unsinkable Mommy Adler" in season one, while Ivey played Connick's mother in the previous episode, "The Needle and the Omelet's Done". Katie Couric portrayed herself in the episode. Vera Wang designed Grace's wedding dress, which cost approximately $20,000. The show's costume designer, Lori Eskowitz-Carter, provided Sergio Rossi boots worth $1,750 for the episode, while Grace's jewelry was supplied by Martin Katz.

== Reception ==
"Marry Me a Little, Marry Me a Little More" brought in an average of 24.3 million viewers during its original airing on November 21, 2002, the second-largest audience ever for a Will & Grace episode; as a result, CSI: Crime Scene Investigation received its smallest audience that season. The episode received an 11.8 rating/27% share among viewers in the 18-49 demographic, making it Will & Grace's second-largest audience ever in that demographic. Editor Peter Chakos was nominated for an Emmy Award in the category of "Outstanding Multi-Camera Picture Editing for a Series" at the 55th Primetime Emmy Awards.

The episode received a mixed reception from television critics. Alan Pergament of The Buffalo News commented that "like all hourlong episodes of comedies, this one becomes a little bloated in the middle. But it holds up for the most part and has some very funny and poignant moments, including an emotional rooftop scene between Will and Grace that defines their friendship." Whitney Matheson of USA Today said she "was bored to tears" by the episode, while Jeffrey Robinson of DVD Talk thought it was a "fun episode". Seth Davis of Sports Illustrated was not complimentary towards Connick: "Whoever came up with the idea to cast Connick on Will & Grace should be fired." A writer from Entertainment Weekly, however, commented that Leo "fits right in to the antic Will & Grace world of Will, Grace, Jack, and Karen." Matt Roush of TV Guide was not thrilled of the idea of Grace getting married, writing: "Well, is the show called Will & Grace & Leo? I don't think so." The Star-Ledger's Alan Sepinwall commented that Will & Grace "has already been infected with a sense of cattiness and despair, as the writers try to top each other's nasty one-liners. A happy, healthy relationship could be just the cure for what's ailing the one-time Emmy winner."

Bill Carroll, Vice President and Director for the Katz Television Group, a consulting firm, wondered where the show would head after Grace got married: "The real question now is, where is the critical development of that show going to be? Now that they've married her off, where is the show's focus?" The Hartford Courant's Roger Catlin did not think Grace's and Leo's marriage would last long. "Are we to believe Will & Grace will now be about a married woman, her husband and her gay roommate? That they'll all still live together? That Connick will no longer have merely special-guest status? The inevitable breakup and annulment to come are as obvious as the sweeps-timing of the ceremony."
