= Fagel Attraction =

- Will & Grace episode
- Episode no.: Season 4 Episode 23
- Directed by: James Burrows
- Written by: Jenji Kohan
- Original air date: April 25, 2002

Guest appearances
- Michael Douglas as Detective Gavin Hatch; Molly Shannon as Val; Barry Livingston as Vince

Episode chronology
← Previous "Wedding Balls"	Next → "Hocus Focus"
- Will & Grace season 4

"Fagel Attraction" is the twenty-third episode of the fourth season of the American television series Will & Grace. It was written by Jenji Kohan and directed by series producer James Burrows. The episode originally aired on NBC in the United States on April 25, 2002. Michael Douglas, Molly Shannon, and Barry Livingston guest starred.

In the episode, Will (Eric McCormack) files a police report after his laptop computer is stolen. He then meets a police detective (Douglas) who takes a special interest in his case as they go undercover—however, Will does not know that the detective participates in Jack's (Sean Hayes) therapy group for gays. Meanwhile, Grace (Debra Messing) is once again hassled by her kleptomaniac neighbor Val (Shannon) who opens a rival design business and prospers by stealing Grace's ideas.

Since airing, "Fagel Attraction" has received positive reviews from television critics. According to Nielsen ratings, the episode was watched by 14.3 million households during its original broadcast. Douglas was mostly praised from critics for his performance and received an Emmy Award nomination in the "Outstanding Guest Actor in a Comedy Series" category.

== Plot ==
Following the theft of Will's (Eric McCormack) laptop computer, detective Gavin Hatch (Michael Douglas) assures Will he will do everything he can to get his laptop back. Upon meeting Will, Gavin becomes attracted to him. Instead of asking him out on a date, due to fear of rejection, Gavin makes up an elaborate story that Will's laptop theft was part of a "gay laptop-theft ring." Meanwhile, at Grace Adler Designs, Grace (Debra Messing) is showing some designs to a potential client, Vince (Barry Livingston). He is fond of her work and would like to become her client, but reveals that he promised another designer he would listen to her ideas too. Grace becomes horrified when she learns that her kleptomaniac neighbor and nemesis, Val (Molly Shannon), is the other designer.

Meanwhile, Will and Gavin go undercover at a gay nightclub. Will believes they are doing police business for the "gay laptop-theft ring", but it is actually a date planned by Gavin. Jack (Sean Hayes), a friend of Will's, sees the two dancing and is dumbfounded. Jack and Gavin attend the same gay therapy group, and the two dislike one another, which leads Jack to tell Will all he knows about Gavin. At Will's apartment, Gavin reveals to Will that he is gay, after Will admits to having a liking to him, but that he is "barking up the wrong tree." Will, however, identifies Gavin's problem with asking men out and his knack of making stories up to spend time with them. Before Gavin leaves, Will tells him to face his fears.

At Grace Adler Designs, Val suggests she and Grace integrate their presentations in the same meeting with Vince, to which Grace agrees. In the middle of Grace's presentation, Val begins repeating the same thing Grace says. This leads to the two bickering, which prompts Karen (Megan Mullally), Grace's friend and socialite assistant, to pull them apart. She tells them that violence is never the answer, "but sometimes it is," then chops Val behind the neck, rendering Val unconscious. Karen tells Grace to go get Vince, who was out of the room, while she gets "rid" of Val's body.

== Production ==
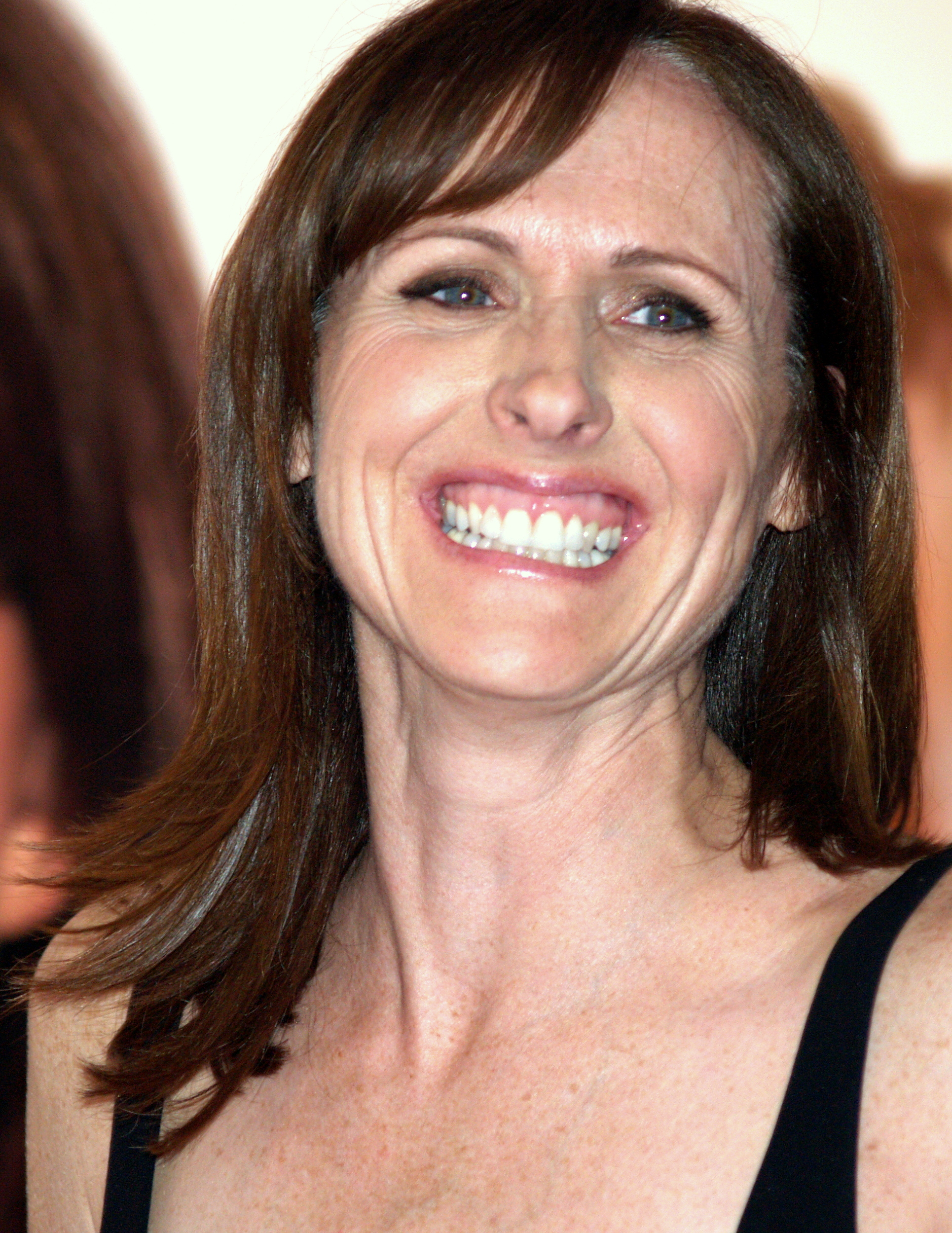
Molly Shannon made her fourth appearance on the show in this episode.

"Fagel Attraction" was written by Jenji Kohan and directed by series producer James Burrows. The episode's title is a reference to the 1987 film Fatal Attraction which starred actor Michael Douglas. In March 2002, it was announced that Michael Douglas would guest star on the show, playing a gay detective who becomes attracted to Will. His role on the show was his first television acting role in almost 30 years, since his role in the police drama The Streets of San Francisco. It was also confirmed that actress Molly Shannon would reprise her role as Val, Grace's nemesis. This was Shannon's fourth appearance on the show.

While in negotiations, Douglas' staff approached the show's producers about a guest spot for Douglas and the sitcom's executives sought to work against Douglas' image. His management team wanted him to stretch beyond his usual roles, and believed a successful comedy show like Will & Grace would be a good way to do so. The show's producers said that Douglas was willing to go with any story line the writers could come up with. Executive producer and co-creator of the show, David Kohan said: "There's something great about playing on a person's iconic status. [...] Michael Douglas often plays these virile men, and the idea of making him a gay cop too shy to ask Will out was funny."

However, in another interview, it was revealed that Douglas himself called the show's producers to ask them about a guest appearance. "I am a big fan of the show, so when the opportunity to guest-star came along, I had to grab it", Douglas said on his official website. "It's been awhile since I've performed in front of a live audience, and it was great to flex that old theater acting muscle. It was also my first experience with a television sitcom."

== Reception ==
In its original American broadcast, "Fagel Attraction" was watched by 14.3 million households, according to Nielsen ratings. It received a 10.3 rating/15 share among viewers in the 18–49 demographic, and was the seventh highest-rated show on the NBC network that week. "Fagel Attraction" has received mostly positive reviews from television critics since airing, and several reviewers praised Douglas for his appearance. Debra Messing, who plays Grace, commented that it was "hilarious how easily" Douglas played his character in the episode. In 2002, he was nominated for a Primetime Emmy Award in the "Outstanding Guest Actor in a Comedy Series" category for this episode, but lost to Anthony LaPaglia of Frasier. In March 2006, Entertainment Weekly named Douglas' guest spot the fourth most memorable guest appearance on Will & Grace.

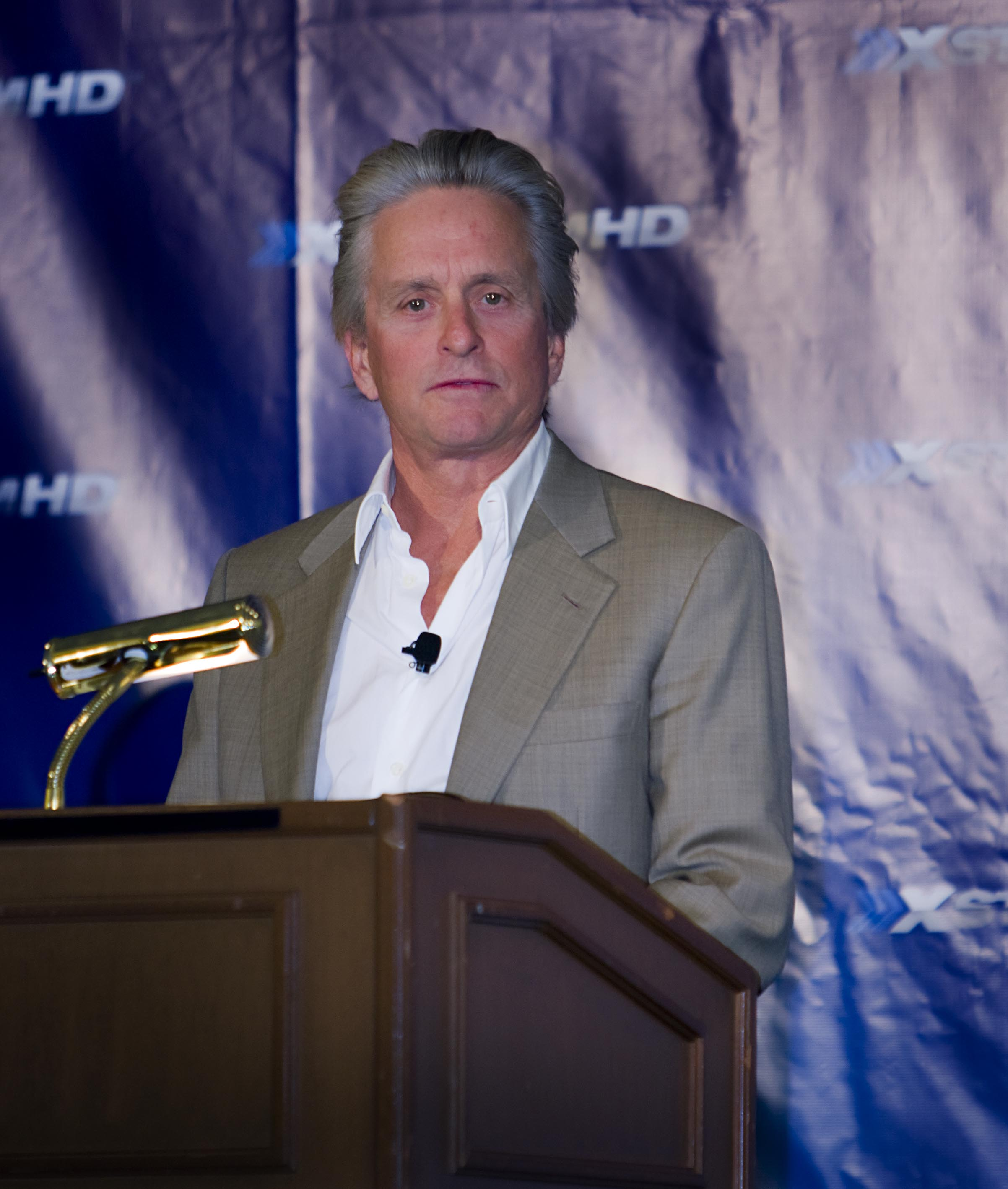
Michael Douglas received praise for his performance.

Kevin McDonough of Charleston Daily Mail called Douglas' appearance an "unforgettable performance", and Adam Buckman of the New York Post commented that Douglas is "such a commanding presence on screen" that he "steals every scene". Renée Peck of The Times-Picayune reported that she enjoyed watching Douglas have fun with an "off-the-wall" role combining an alternate lifestyle with altered consciousness. TV Guide contributor Matt Roush, in review of season four, said that without guest appearances from actors such as Douglas, the season "would be an awfully sad misfire." Mark A. Perigard of the Boston Herald wrote that the "biggest laughs" in the episode come when Douglas holds hands with Will and then dances with him. Alan Pergament of The Buffalo News also praised this sequence, calling it "priceless".

The episode received less positive reviews as well. Allan Johnson of the Chicago Tribune wrote that the episode is good, but not great: "It proves stunt-casting doesn't necessarily work unless the actor is up to the script and lead performers. And Douglas, an otherwise fine actor, basically does a caricature of a macho gay man." Ted Cox of the Daily Herald wrote that the idea of Douglas being cast as a neurotic gay man "isn't a whole lot to this episode." A television reviewer from Deseret News thought that because of his role on Will & Grace, Douglas should give the Oscar he won earlier in his career back. The reviewer concluded: "He's embarrassingly bad, as is this episode."

Johnson was complimentary towards Molly Shannon: "Far funnier is a subplot with Molly Shannon of Saturday Night Live back as Will and Grace's (Messing) whacked-out neighbor Val [...] Shannon, always funny and fun to watch, isn't a mere stunt ... Shannon shows a guest actor can shine when paired with the right character." The Palm Beach Post's Kevin D. Thompson wrote that Shannon's performance "displays why she should have her own sitcom", while Cox wrote that she has a "quality in which a tightly bound surface normalcy seems to barely contain a bundle of tics and impulses, and the writers make excellent use of it by having Val try to first steal Grace's flair for design, then cop one of her clients." Perigard noted that Grace and Val's storyline made it "clear that the producers just like the sight of the two women flailing their arms in a mock catfight."
