= A Chorus Lie =

- Will & Grace episode
- Scene where Grace (Debra Messing) is making out with Owen (Matt Damon), and Jack (Sean Hayes) photographs them both.
- Episode no.: Season 4 Episode 16
- Directed by: James Burrows
- Written by: Tracy Poust; Jon Kinnally
- Cinematography by: Tony Askins
- Editing by: Peter Chakos
- Original air date: February 7, 2002

Guest appearances
- Matt Damon as Owen; Leslie Jordan as Beverley Leslie; Patrick Kerr as Choral Director

Episode chronology
← Previous "Dyeing is Easy, Comedy is Hard"	Next → "Someone Old, Someplace New"
- Will & Grace season 4

"A Chorus Lie" is the sixteenth episode of the American television series Will & Grace's fourth season. It was written by Tracy Poust and Jon Kinnally and directed by series producer James Burrows. The episode originally aired on NBC in the United States on February 7, 2002. Guest stars in "A Chorus Lie" include Matt Damon, Leslie Jordan, Patrick Kerr, and real life members of the Gay Men's Chorus of Los Angeles.

In the episode, Jack (Sean Hayes) begins a rivalry with a fellow named Owen (Matt Damon). They are competing to be the final entrant in a gay men's chorus, and after learning that Owen is straight, Jack tries to "in" him with help from Grace (Debra Messing). Meanwhile, Karen (Megan Mullally) tries to pass off Will (Eric McCormack) as her lover and not her lawyer when she discovers that she is the object of pity for being single at her own Valentine's Day party.

The episode received positive reviews from television critics. According to Nielsen ratings, "A Chorus Lie" was watched by 25.3 million viewers during its original broadcast, making it the most-watched episode in the history of the show. The episode garnered three Emmy Award nominations and won one in the "Cinematography for a Multi-Camera Series" category.

== Plot ==
Following his audition, Jack (Sean Hayes) receives a callback and is informed that he has become a finalist for the Manhattan Gay Men's Chorus. At the final auditions for the chorus, Jack is informed by the choral director that he will have a solo, but before he can sing it, Owen (Matt Damon)—originally intended for the solo part—barges in and sings his part. Jack sees Owen as a competition and thinks of a way to get rid of him. He learns that Owen is posing as a gay man, after observing his gaze at a woman. Jack strikes a plan to get Owen to confess he is straight, in which he invites him to "rehearse" in Will and Grace's apartment. Jack's plan fails miserably, so he enlists the help of Grace (Debra Messing) to "in" Owen for him. Grace begins flirting with Owen, which ultimately leads to the two making out, prompting Jack to barge in and take a picture. Owen, however, tricks him into pulling the film out of the camera, destroying the proof. At the chorus rehearsal, Jack and Owen begin bickering, which results in Jack revealing to everyone that Owen is straight, to which Owen admits. Despite the revelation, the chorus director (Patrick Kerr) tells Owen he has made it into the chorus.

Meanwhile, Will (Eric McCormack) accepts Karen's (Megan Mullally) invitation as her date, due to her husband being in prison, to her annual Valentine's Day party. It is there that Karen passes off Will as her "gigolo," after her rival Beverley Leslie (Leslie Jordan) teases her for being alone. Word gets around that Will is "working" for Karen for the weekend, which prompts many women asking for Will's "services". Much to his dismay, Will believes he, a lawyer, is accepting legal clients. Karen finally reveals to Will that she has been telling everyone he is her gigolo. Will becomes outraged at the revelation and leaves. At the party, Beverley makes fun of Karen because she has no partner for the annual spotlight dance. Will, however, returns and dances with Karen.

== Production ==
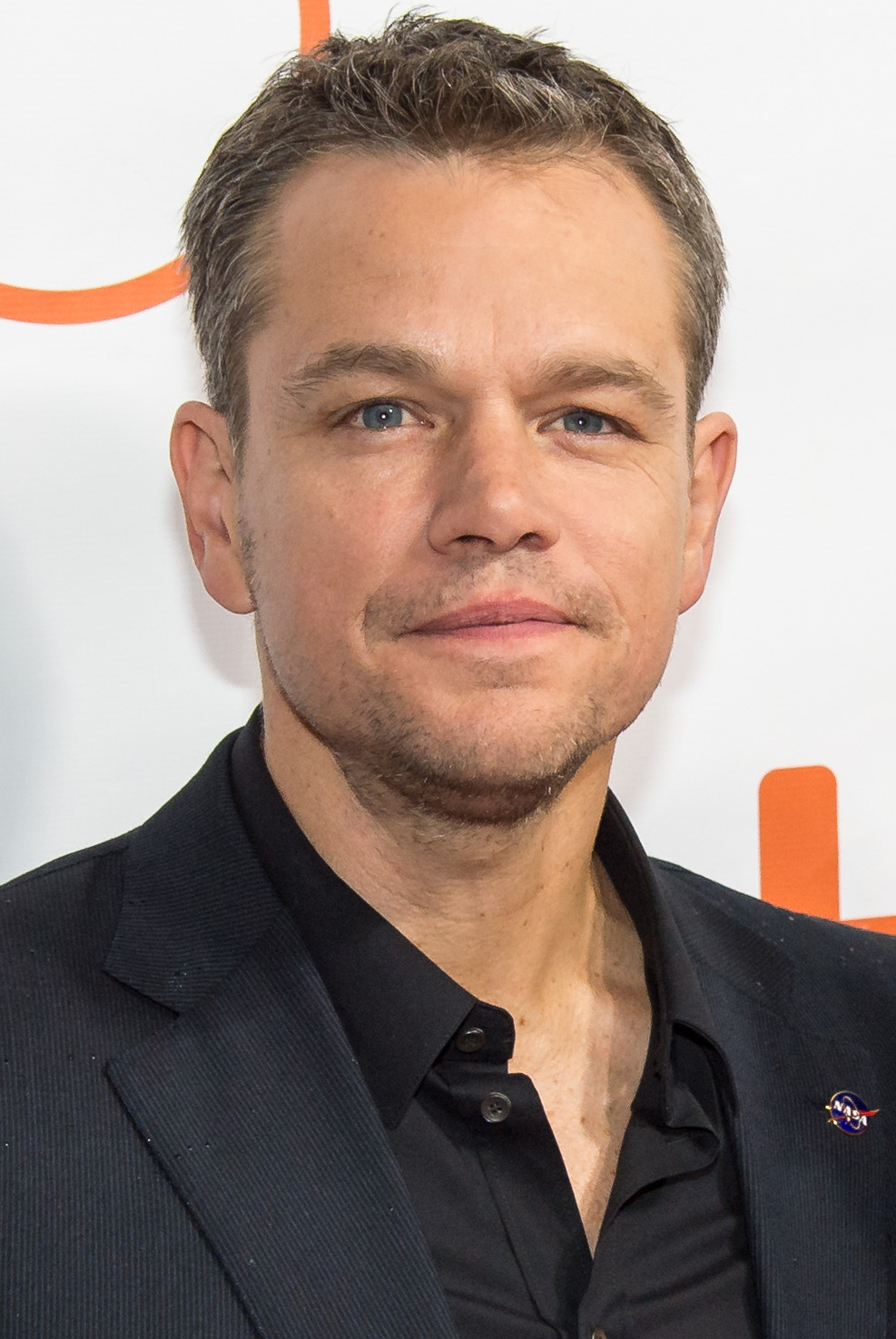
Matt Damon (pictured here in 2015) guest starred on the episode "A Chorus Lie" at the request of his friend Sean Hayes who plays Jack on the show.

"A Chorus Lie" was written by Tracy Poust and Jon Kinnally and directed by series producer James Burrows. In January 2002, it was confirmed that actor Matt Damon would guest star on Will & Grace. Damon guest starred on the episode to promote his then upcoming movie at the time The Bourne Identity, which was released in June the same year. In the same month, it was announced that NBC would extend "A Chorus Lie" with four additional minutes to accommodate the network's "supersize" plan to compete against the CBS reality show Survivor. Jeff Zucker, who at the time was President of NBC Entertainment, said that the show's producers approached NBC about the "supersizing" idea rather than the other way around; "When scripts came in long, [the producers] asked NBC if the network could handle a few extra minutes of footage." Zucker commented that the lengthening of this episode "turned out great, and there was no real extra work for anyone. It's a great development that [the producers] know that [NBC is] open to things like this."

In an interview with the San Francisco Chronicle, Damon revealed that he was asked to appear on the show by his friend Sean Hayes, who plays Jack on Will & Grace. Damon enjoyed the idea for the episode and agreed to appear on the show. He commented that it was easy for him to get into character because he had previously played a gay character in the film The Talented Mr. Ripley (1999). Following his appearance, Damon told the Chicago Sun-Times in June 2002 that he would like to come back and guest star.

== Cultural references ==
When Grace and Owen make out on the couch, Grace is wearing a pair of Seven jeans. According to Betsy Taylor of the St. Louis Post-Dispatch, this scene "prompted a ripple effect" in the United States of people seeking out the jeans label. At the chorus rehearsal, Jack and Owen are singing with the chorus when they begin bickering. Jack sings "Lyin' and a-cheatin'!" to Owen and Owen sings "tubby and a-tone-deaf" to Jack, a reference to Hal David and Burt Bacharach's 1963 song "Wishin' and Hopin'".

== Reception ==
"A Chorus Lie" brought in 25.3 million viewers, which drew the highest number of viewers in the show's history, according to Nielsen ratings. The episode received a 15.5 rating/23 share among viewers in the 18–49 demographic. The episode outperformed the 15.2 rating/22 share of CBS' crime drama series CSI: Crime Scene Investigation in the 18-49 category. The episode was nominated for three Emmy Awards, Tony Askins won an Emmy for Cinematography for a Multi-Camera Series, while Peter Chakos was nominated for Outstanding Multi-Camera Picture Editing for a Series, and James Burrows was nominated for Outstanding Directing for a Comedy Series.

The episode received generally positive reception. According to Darrell Giles of The Courier Mail, several American critics characterized it as the best episode of the show. Jason Steele of the Chicago Tribune's RedEye named it one of his three favorite episodes of Will & Grace. Jeffrey Robinson of DVD Talk wrote that the episode was hilarious. Ken Tucker of Entertainment Weekly noted, "Damon's spunky appearance ... as a straight guy posing as homosexual and competing with Jack (Sean Hayes) for a spot in a gay men's choir. The show is endlessly imaginative in the ways it explores themes like this with a humor that doesn't betray or belittle its core gay characters." Scott D. Pierce of the Deseret News was less positive about the episode, stating that it "plays like bad camp. There's nothing realistic about it—[the characters] seem more like the inhabitants of a lame Saturday Night Live sketch than marginally real characters." He also noted that "the extent of the tastelessness of the sex talk and Karen faking a sexual encounter is amazing."

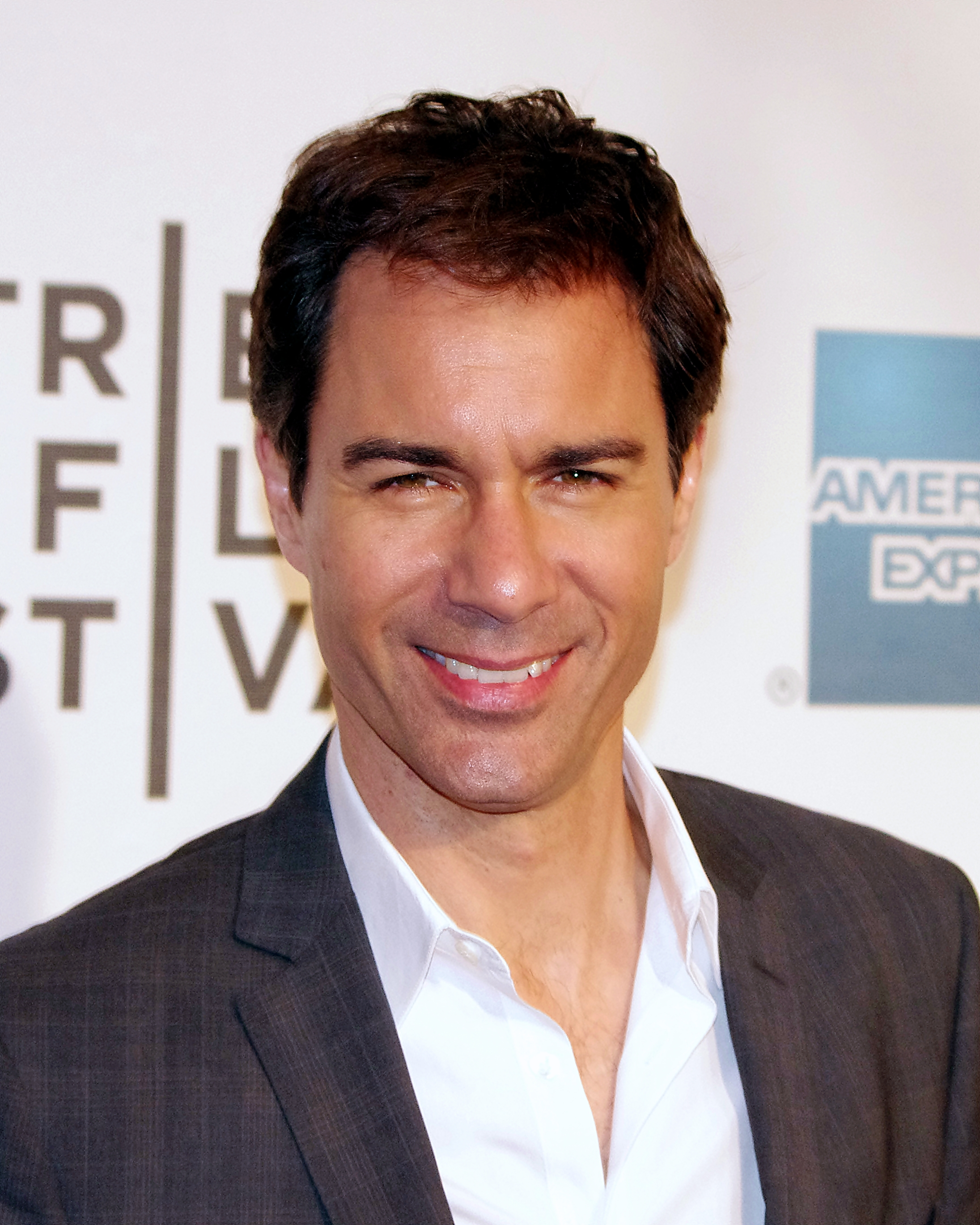
Eric McCormack praised Damon's performance.

Critics praised Damon's performance in the episode. A television reviewer from The Sacramento Bee noted that Damon "did a well-publicized (and very good) gig" on the show. Robert Bianco of USA Today commented that Damon was "incredibly charming" and funny. Matt Roush of TV Guide, in review of season four, said: "If it weren't for some inspired guest stars — Matt Damon as a straight guy bluffing his way into a gay chorus, Michael Douglas as a gay detective clowning it up on the dance floor, Glenn Close as a lusty photographer groping both Will and Grace during a shoot — this season would be an awfully sad misfire." Wales on Sunday's Wil Marlow called Damon's performance one of the most memorable guest appearances in the history of the show, and commented that he "held his own well against serial scene-stealer Sean Hayes." Mark Perigard of the Boston Herald said the episode "flies with jokes predicated on stereotypes and sexual innuendo", but "Damon is a good sport with all the silliness, though, and seems more at ease here in the sitcom than he has in his last three films." Eric McCormack, who portrays Will, said Damon was "magnificent" in the episode and a "great experience" for the cast of the show. Sean Hayes cites "A Chorus Lie" as one of his favorite episodes. In March 2006, Entertainment Weekly named Damon's guest spot as their number two most memorable guest appearance on Will & Grace.
