= Joe Patrick Ward =

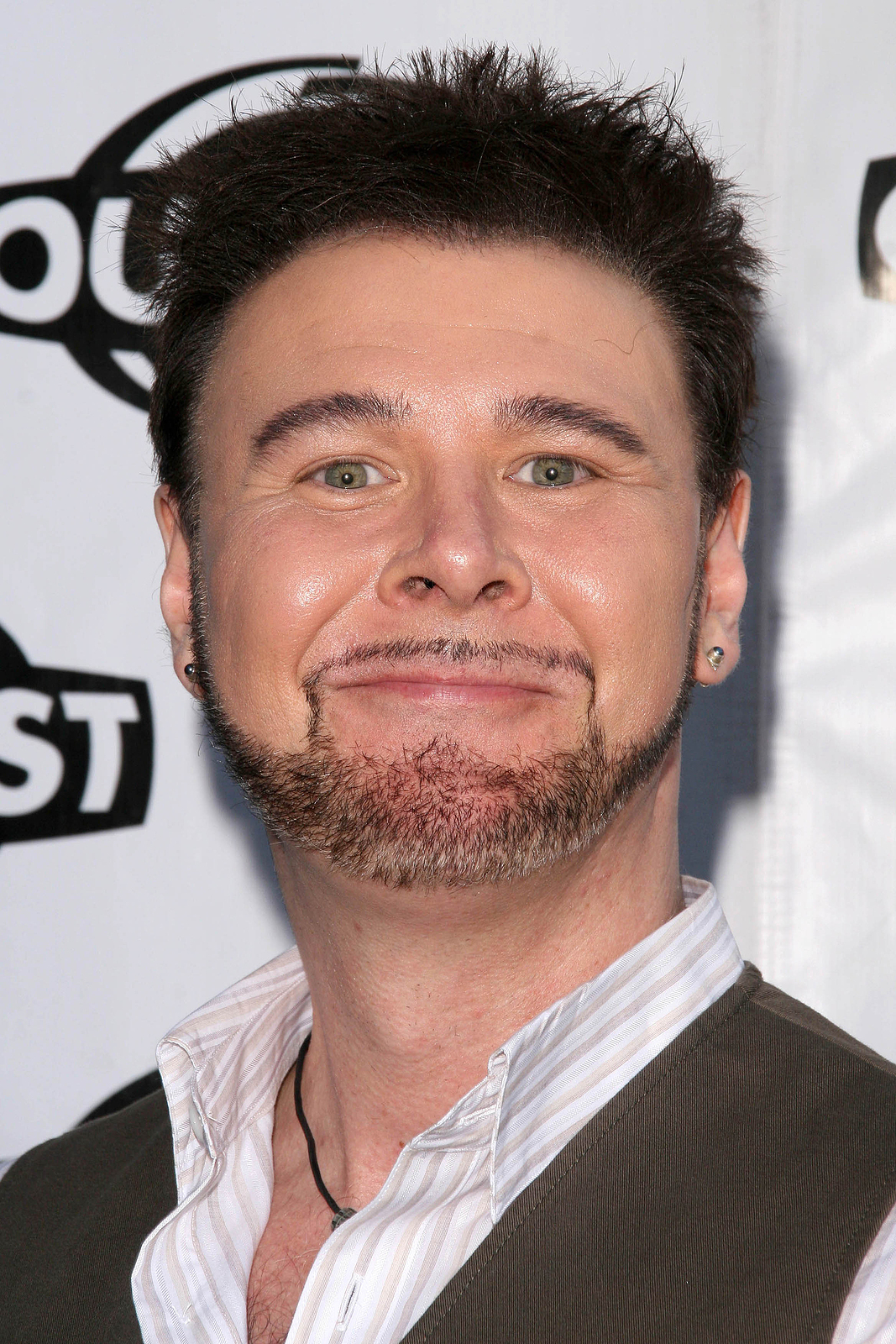
Joe Patrick Ward is an American playwright, actor and composer/lyricist for theatre, television and film.

Joe Patrick Ward is an American playwright, composer and lyricist. Ward has scored music for film and television, and has written songs (both music and lyrics) for several stage plays and musicals. He is a recipient of the Los Angeles Ovation Award for Best World Premiere Musical, and the Los Angeles Drama Critics Circle Award and NAACP Theatre Award for Best Production.

== Film and television ==
Ward composed music soundtracks for the films Blues for Willadean (2012), Southern Baptist Sissies (2013), and A Very Sordid Wedding (2017). For television, he scored all episodes of the comedy Sordid Lives: The Series (2008) for LogoTV. He also had songs commissioned for the Animated Feature division of Warner Brothers Studios.

== Stage ==
Ward wrote the music and lyrics for the off-Broadway musical Hysterical Blindness (And Other Southern Tragedies That Have Plagued My Life Thus Far). The play was produced at 15 Van Dam (now the SoHo Playhouse) in 1994 and ran for seven months. The show was co-written with Ward’s longtime friend, Emmy-Award winning character actor Leslie Jordan, who also starred in the production. Ward directed Jordan in a subsequent production of "Hysterical Blindness" at the Circle Theatre in Fort Worth, Texas.

In 2001 Ward first staged The Grave White Way, an original musical for which he wrote the book, music and lyrics. The show follows five dead stage actors attempting to gain admittance into Heaven by performing a revue of the flop musicals that condemned them to the musical theatre purgatory known as "The Grave White Way". The songs within the show satirize the history of bad musical theater from the 1930s to the present. One of the show's unique gimmicks was casting a theatre celebrity in every performance, including "Wicked" composer Stephen Schwartz, stage legend John Raitt, original Broadway "Dreamgirl" Loretta Devine, and Tony winners Billy Porter and Gregory Jbara. Variety called the show a “witty spoof of Broadway flops with a limitless future".

Ward also wrote the music and lyrics for the musical Judy's Scary Little Christmas with co-writers David Church and James Webber. The show is a spoof of 1950’s television variety shows and contains campy humor based on the sensationalized personal lives of its main characters Judy Garland, Bing Crosby, Liberace, Ethel Merman, Richard Nixon, Lillian Hellman and Joan Crawford. Originally produced in Los Angeles in 2002, the show received nominations for Best Musical from L.A. Weekly and the Los Angeles Ovation Awards. Connie Champagne, who portrayed "Judy Garland" in the production, won the Ovation Award for "Best Actress in a Musical". The play is published by Samuel French and is frequently produced in cities across the United States. A recording of the original Los Angeles cast was released on CD in 2005.

In 2003, Ward wrote original songs for the theatrical production The Trials and Tribulations of a Trailer Trash Housewife (also published by Samuel French). With a book by Del Shores, the play addresses the subject of domestic abuse. Originally produced at the Zephyr Theatre in Los Angeles, the show won "Best Production” from both the Los Angeles Drama Critics Circle Awards and the NAACP Theatre Awards. All five of the play’s original actors, including Beth Grant, Dale Dickey, David Steen, and future Academy Award winner Octavia Spencer, reprised their stage roles for the film version, which was retitled Blues for Willadean. Ward’s songs in the film (and play) were sung by Billboard Dance Recording Artist Debby Holiday, who portrayed “The Blues Singer”.
