= Levi Kreis =

American musician and actor

- Born: Levi Kreis; November 4, 1981 (age 44); Oliver Springs, Tennessee
- Genres: Southern Soul, Gospel, Pop
- Occupations: Actor, Singer/Songwriter
- Instruments: Vocals, piano,
- Years active: 2005–present
- Label: Vision 9 Records
- Website: LeviKreis.com

Levi Kreis (born November 4, 1981) is an American actor and singer from Oliver Springs, Tennessee. In 2010, he won a Tony Award for playing Jerry Lee Lewis in Million Dollar Quartet.

== Career ==
=== Music ===
Kreis's debut album, One of the Ones, was released on November 17, 2005, and was accompanied by an appearance on a special SiriusXM's edition of The Apprentice. Four hopefuls were chosen from thousands of submissions. The two teams had a challenge to write, record, produce and package an artist for XM Cafe; Kreis and his team won the challenge. His song "I Should Go" was featured in the Jan 10, 2006 episode of Days of Our Lives and "Hardly A Hero" (both from the debut album) was featured in the Mar 10 episode of Young And The Restless.

He followed his debut album with The Gospel According to Levi, confronting religion and its unhealthy views on sexuality, specifically as it relates to the LGBT community and conversion therapy (Kreis did six years with Exodus International). In 2009, Kreis won the OUTMusic Award for his song "Stained Glass Window", a song inspired by the Del Shores play Southern Baptist Sissies.

His music has also been featured in The Vampire Diaries, Sons of Anarchy, So You Think You Can Dance, Mob Wives, and films The War Room and Kiss the Bride.

Kreis has settled into the southern soul genre and released an EP, "Bad Habit", on March 20, 2020.

=== Acting ===
Kreis was cast in the role of Roger in the national tour of Rent. He next starred in Don't Let Go starring Katharine Ross and Scott Wilson. He also played opposite Matthew McConaughey with the role of Adam Meiks in Bill Paxton's directorial debut Frailty.

Kreis was part of the original cast of One Red Flower: Letters from 'Nam, a musical based on the book Dear America: Letters Home from Vietnam. The musical was written and directed by Paris Barclay.

The producers of One Red Flower: Letters from 'Nam later sought Kreis to portray Jerry Lee Lewis in the Broadway musical Million Dollar Quartet. On June 13, 2010, he received the Tony Award for "Best Featured Actor in a Musical" for the role. He also won the Outer Critics Circle Award for Best Featured Actor in a Musical, along with a Drama League nomination. Kreis left the show in March 2011 following an injury.

Other notable stage credits include the Tony-nominated Broadway revival of Violet, Smokey Joe's Cafe at Arena Stage, and Pump Boys and Dinettes at The Village Theater.

Kreis was involved in the development of the musicals Mozart, l'opéra rock and Get Jack. He starred as Pastor Jimmy Ray Brewton in the film A Very Sordid Wedding (2017) and as Tom Cutler in the film The Divide (2018). Beginning in October 2021, Kreis starred as narrator Hermes in the first US national tour of Hadestown.

== Personal life ==
In the May 2010 edition of The Rage Monthly, a San Diego gay lifestyle magazine, Kreis answered questions from the author Bill Biss about coming out, saying:

I think it was the first of many moves toward me dispelling what I call the illusion of limitation. To think that opportunities become limited because of anything such as sexuality, age, race, etc, is to not have faith in the absolute support the universe has in our creative expression. It's like telling God that He is incapable! It's like telling me that there is something wrong with me. I can't subscribe to any of this anymore. I believe nature even teaches us that all life supports itself, and that very support is ours to the degree we believe it to be. I believe that God is all-supportative, all-good and there is no opposition to that. To live in this space, own whom you are and step into life with this level of authority and faith is how I hoped to live ever since I released that first CD and came out.

Kreis is a licensed spiritual practitioner through the Centers for Spiritual Living and launched a podcast called The Church of Kreis in March 2020, focusing on the law of attraction and practical self-improvement.

He is married to classical-crossover artist Jason Antone.

== Discography ==
- "One of the Ones" (2005)
- "The Gospel According To Levi" (2007)
- "Bygones" (2008)
- "Where I Belong" (2009)
- "Live @ Joe's Pub" (2011)
- "Imagine Paradise"(2013)
- "Broadway at the Keys" (2017)
- "Liberated" (2018)
- "Home For The Holidays" (2018)
- "Three Words" - Single (2019)
- "Faith" - Single (2020)
- "Bad Habit" (2020)

== Awards and nominations ==
Year	Award	Category	Nominated work	Result	Ref.
2010	Tony Award	Best Featured Actor in a Musical	Million Dollar Quartet	Won	
2010	Outer Critics Circle Award	Outstanding Featured Actor in a Musical	Million Dollar Quartet	Won	
2010	Drama League Award	Distinguished Performance	Million Dollar Quartet	Nominated	
