= Margot Rose =

American actress

- Occupations: Actress, composer, lyricist
- Years active: 1978–present

Margot Rose is an American television and film actress, composer and lyricist.

== Background ==
Margot began her career in 1975 working in theater (Godspell) and television commercials and was a member of the original company of I'm Getting My Act Together & Taking it on the Road at the New York Shakespeare Festival, then later at the Circle in the Square Downtown.

== Career ==
Rose has guest starred on over sixty television series including: Hill Street Blues, E/R, Night Court, Star Trek: Deep Space Nine, L.A. Law, The West Wing, Judging Amy, Desperate Housewives, Law and Order: Los Angeles, Murphy's Law, The Mentalist and Numb3rs, among many others. She had a leading role in the 1992 Star Trek: The Next Generation episode "The Inner Light", one of the most widely acclaimed episodes of that series.

Rose has had a number of roles in films, including: 48 Hrs., A Civil Action, True Believer, Brewster's Millions and Hollow Man. Rose composed the music for the 2000 film Sordid Lives and the 2008 television series Sordid Lives: The Series. She also performed in the original Del Shores stage production of Sordid Lives in 1996 in the role of Bitsy Mae Harling.

=== Theater ===
- Still Getting My Act Together
- Equus
- I'm Getting My Act Together and Taking It on the Road
- Godspell
- Sordid Lives
- Largo Desolato
- Last Summer at Bluefish Cove
- Gay '90s Revue
- Siblings
- Robber Bridegroom
- Working
- Taken in Marriage
- Uncommon Women & Others
- Fixations
- Goddess of Mystery
- An Awfully Big Adventure

=== Filmography ===
- Killer's Delight (1978) as Bar Patron
- Report to Murphy (1982, TV Series) as Baker
- Hill Street Blues (1982, TV Series) as Katy Bambridge
- Something So Right (1982, TV Series) as 2nd Club Act
- 48 Hrs. (1982) as Casey
- We Got It Made (1983, TV Series) as Sally
- Simon & Simon (1984, TV Series) as Molly Jessup
- Never Again (1984, TV Movie) as Denise
- E/R (1985, TV Series) as Sally
- Brewster's Millions (1985) as Torchy's Waitress
- He's the Mayor (1986, TV Series) as Kelly Enright
- Foley Square (1986, TV Series)
- Stranded (1986, TV Movie) as Anita
- Starman (1986, TV Series) as Laurie
- Night Court (1986, TV Series) as Charlotte Lund
- Murder Ordained (1987, TV Movie) as Nancy Horst
- Hotel (1987, TV Series) as Margaret Hudson
- Hunter (1988, TV Series) as Mary Ressell
- True Believer (1989) as Ms. Jessum
- 21 Jump Street (1989, TV Series) as D.A. Katherine Sullivan
- Chain Letter (1989, TV Movie)
- Freddy's Nightmares (1990, TV Series) as Mollie Roads
- Equal Justice (1990, TV Series) as Debbie / Chris' Secretary
- Eating (1990) as Party Guest #11
- The Famous Teddy Z (1990, TV Series)
- Howie and Rose (1991, TV Movie) as Lisa Hubbard
- Star Trek: The Next Generation (1992, Episode: "The Inner Light") as Eline
- A House of Secrets and Lies (1992, TV Movie) as Caroline
- Her Final Fury: Betty Broderick, the Last Chapter (1999, TV Movie)
- From the Files of Joseph Wambaugh: A Jury of One (1992, TV Movie)
- Jack's Place (1993, TV Series) as Hillary Morgan
- Dying to Love You (1993, TV Movie) as Agent McCormick
- Lois & Clark: The New Adventures of Superman (1993, TV Movie) as Mrs. Powell
- L.A. Law (1994, TV Series) as Mrs. Askoff's Atty. Cecily
- Models Inc. (1994-1995, TV Series) as Marie Colvin
- Beverly Hills, 90210 (1996, TV Series) as Kelly's Student Advisor
- Star Trek: Deep Space Nine (1996, Episode: "Hard Time") as Rinn
- Melrose Place (1996, TV Series) as Margeaux
- Murder One (1996, TV Series) as Dr. Gretchen Hearn
- Mr. & Mrs Smith (1996, TV Series) as Local newscaster
- Chicago Hope (1997-1998, TV Series) as Attorney Elizabeth Moreno / Artina Reinhart
- L.A. Doctors (1998, TV Series) as Dr. Meyer
- A Civil Action (1998) as Donna Robbins
- Damon (1998, TV Series)
- Women: Stories of Passion (1999, TV Series) as Christina's Friend
- Getting Away with Murder: The JonBenet Ramsey Story (2000, TV Movie)
- The Pretender (2000, TV Series) as Agent Berger
- Sordid Lives (2000, Composer)
- Hollow Man (2000) as Mrs. Kramer
- Grosse Pointe (2001, TV Series, Director / Composer) as Director
- The Division (2001, TV Series)
- Judging Amy (2001-2004, TV Series) as Atty. Adelle Perlmutter / Denise Toler
- The West Wing (2004, Episode: "The Benign Prerogative") as Portia Colgrave
- Plainsong (2004, TV Movie) as Betty Roubideaux
- The Nine (2006-2007, TV Series) as Mary Sommers
- Sordid Lives: The Series (2008, TV Series, Composer)
- The Mentalist (2009, TV Series) as Belinda Sandborne
- Law and Order: Los Angeles (2010, TV Series) as Warden Linda Jordan
- Desperate Housewives (2010, TV Series) as Principal Harris
- All About Christmas Eve (2012, TV Movie) as Ellen Wright

== Audio work ==
- Tell Me a Story 3: Women of Wonder (Audio CD, narrator and singer)

== Recognition ==
Of Rose's performance in the theatrical production of The Gay '90s Musical in 1997, Variety wrote the play "features the beautifully harmonized voices of Margot Rose, [Bill] Ledesma and [Bill] Hutton as a trio of gay friends who nurture and support each other throughout their lives".

Of her performance in the 1996 theatrical production Sordid Lives Variety wrote "Also lending solid support are ... and Margot Rose as the well-worn Betsy Mae, whose gentle musical offerings of such ballads as 'Will the Circle Be Unbroken,' 'The Water Is Wide' and an original title song punctuate the onstage doings."
