= Sordid Lives =

2000 film by Del Shores

- Theatrical release poster
- Directed by: Del Shores
- Screenplay by: Del Shores
- Based on: Sordid Lives by Del Shores
- Produced by: Sharyn Lane; Victoria Alonso; Max Civon; J. Todd Harris
- Starring: Newell Alexander; Rosemary Alexander; Bonnie Bedelia; Beau Bridges; Earl H. Bullock; Delta Burke; Kirk Geiger; Beth Grant; Sarah Hunley; Leslie Jordan; Olivia Newton-John; Ann Walker
- Cinematography: Max Civon
- Edited by: Ed Marx
- Music by: George S. Clinton
- Production companies: Daly-Harris Productions; Davis Entertainment Classics; Sordid Lives LLC
- Distributed by: Regent Entertainment
- Release dates: February 4, 2000 (Palm Beach Festival); May 11, 2001
- Running time: 111 minutes
- Country: United States
- Language: English
- Budget: $500,000
- Box office: $1.1 million

Sordid Lives is a 2000 American black comedy film written and directed by Del Shores, in his directorial debut. It is based on his 1996 play—inspired by Shore's own coming out experience—about a Texas family coming together in the aftermath of the matriarch's death. Produced independently, filming took place in Los Angeles on a $500,000 budget in late 1999. It was shot digitally that was later transferred to 35mm film.

It premiered at the Palm Beach International Film Festival on February 4, 2000. It was given a limited eight-theater release in the United States on May 11, 2001, that ran until April 2003 and grossed $1.1 million. Reviews from critics were negative, but was described as later gaining cult status.

It was followed by a television series, Sordid Lives: The Series (2008), and a film, A Very Sordid Wedding (2017).

== Premise ==
A family from a small Texas town must come to grips with the accidental death of the elderly family matriarch during a clandestine meeting in a motel room with her much younger married neighbor. The woman's family must deal with their own demons while preparing for what could be an embarrassing funeral.

== Cast ==
- Newell Alexander as Wardell "Bubba" Owens
- Rosemary Alexander as Dr. Eve Bolinger
- Bonnie Bedelia as Latrelle Williamson
- Beau Bridges as G.W. Nethercott
- Earl H. Bullock as Odell Owens
- Delta Burke as Noleta Nethercott
- Kirk Geiger as Ty Williamson
- Beth Grant as Sissy Hickey
- Sarah Hunley as Juanita Bartlett
- Leslie Jordan as Earl "Brother Boy" Ingram
- Olivia Newton-John as Bitsy Mae Harling
- Ann Walker as Vonda DuPree
- Sharron Alexis as Sara Kaufman
- Mitch Carter as Bumper
- Mary-Margaret Lewis as Ethel
- William Edward Phipps as Rev. Barnes
- Dale Dickey as Glyndora
- Gloria LeRoy as Peggy Ingram

== Production ==
=== Development ===
The film is based on Del Shores's stage play Sordid Lives, inspired by his own coming out experience to his parents. It began playing in Los Angeles on May 11, 1996, and ended 13 months later. The play received 14 Drama-Logue Awards and 13 Critic's Choice honors. After writing the script for the film in 1999, he created his own independent company to produce. It also marks his film directorial debut.

=== Casting ===
Beau Bridges was the first to sign on and gave permission to use his name to help raise funds for the film. Cast that returned from the play include Beth Grant, Leslie Jordan, Rosemary Alexander, Mary-Margaret Lewis, Kirk Geiger, Ann Walker, Mitch Carter, Newell Alexander and Earl H. Bullock. Olivia Newton-John replaced Margot Rose as Bitsy Mae. The role of Noleta, originally portrayed by Patrika Darbo, was replaced by Delta Burke, because of Darbo's commitment to Days of Our Lives. The gay character of Ty Williamson that Geiger originated from the play, was offered to actors Noah Wyle and Chris O'Donnell, who both turned it down. A fan of Geiger, Shores showed the producers a tape of his stage performance and agreed to cast him. Geiger, who is straight, said in a 2000 interview "To tell you the truth, I've been petrified from day one of getting in there and not (playing a gay man) right".

=== Filming ===
On a production budget of $500,000, principal photography took place in Los Angeles in late 1999. It was shot in digital video and transferred to 35mm film, which according to Shores "saved a lot of money on this production".

== Music ==
The score was composed by George S. Clinton. The soundtrack was produced by Varèse Sarabande and released by Universal Music Distribution on June 12, 2001. AllMusic gave it a score of two out of five.

=== Track listing ===
No.	Title	Writer(s)	Performer	Length
1.	"Sordid Lives"		Olivia Newton-John	02:07
2.	"Opening"	George S. Clinton	George S. Clinton	02:12
3.	"Trash Talk"		Delta Burke / Beth Grant	00:49
4.	"Better a Painful Ending, Than an Endless Pain"	Sharyn Lane / Mark McGuinn	Bobbie Eakes / Doo Wah Riders	04:08
5.	"Blue Country"	George S. Clinton	George S. Clinton	02:28
6.	"Tallywacker Talk/Mano a Mano"		Bonnie Bedelia /George S. Clinton / Kirk Geiger / Beth Grant	02:48
7.	"Truth Talk"		Bonnie Bedelia / Beth Grant / Ann Walker	00:54
8.	"Will the Circle Be Unbroken"	A.P. Carter	Olivia Newton-John	02:05
9.	"Ty's Theme"	George S. Clinton	George S. Clinton	01:34
10.	"Someone to Grow Young With"	Kacey Jones / Sharyn Lane	Kacey Jones	03:44
11.	"No Fault Love"	Kacey Jones / Sharyn Lane	Kacey Jones	03:11
12.	"Sh*t Talk"		Beau Bridges / Earl H. Bullock	00:13
13.	"Get off the Cross, We Need the Wood"	Kacey Jones / Sharyn Lane	J. Scott Jones	02:24
14.	"Cheatin'"		Newell Alexander	01:39
15.	"Break-Out Talk/Escape"		Newell Alexander /Rosemary Alexander /Mitch Carter /George S. Clinton / Leslie Jordan / Mary Margaret Lewis	01:39
16.	"Please Don't Be Gay"	Sharyn Lane	Sharron Alexis	02:19
17.	"Mother/Son Talk"		Bonnie Bedelia / Kirk Geiger	01:55
18.	"Coming Home"		Olivia Newton-John	02:10
19.	"In Daddy's Eyes"	George S. Clinton	George S. Clinton	04:17
20.	"Tex-Mex"	George S. Clinton	George S. Clinton	01:59
21.	"Funeral Talk"		Olivia Newton-John	01:03
22.	"Just As I Am"	William B. Bradbury / Charlotte Elliot	Olivia Newton-John	01:01
23.	"Transvestite Talk"		Bonnie Bedelia / Beau Bridges / Kirk Geiger / Beth Grant / Leslie Jordan / Olivia Newton-John /Ann Walker	00:32
24.	"Just As I Am (Conclusion)"	William B. Bradbury / Charlotte Elliot	Olivia Newton-John	00:41
25.	"Mama Talk"		Leslie Jordan	00:05
26.	"Sordid Lives (Reprise)"		Olivia Newton-John	00:58
27.	"Trust Yourself"	Olivia Newton-John	Olivia Newton-John	05:38
Total length:				54:33

== Release ==
Sordid Lives premiered at the Palm Beach International Film Festival on February 4, 2000, and was screened at the Philadelphia Gay and Lesbian Film Festival on July 18, 2000. It began an eight-theater limited run in the United States by Regent Entertainment on May 11, 2001. In its opening weekend it made $14,000 and grossed a total of $1.1 million after ending its run on April 20, 2003.

=== Home media ===
Fox Home Entertainment released the DVD on March 18, 2003, and sold over 300,000 units. Wolfe Video released the Blu-ray on September 30, 2014.

== Reception ==
=== Critical response ===
On the review aggregator website Rotten Tomatoes, 37% of 27 critics' reviews are positive, with an average rating of 4.8/10. Metacritic, which uses a weighted average, assigned the film a score of 47 out of 100, based on 8 critics, indicating "mixed or average" reviews.

Ken Eisner of Variety wrote what Sordid Lives does best is "showing Southern gals in the full flight of rabid self-denial — it's as screamingly funny as this subgenre can get". He took issue with Shore's addition of "poignant confessions, gay polemics and heart-tugging family redemption", saying the "high fizz eventually goes flat". He gave praise to the production value and the cast, particularly Bonnie Bedelia. Kevin Thomas of the Los Angeles Times wrote "Sordid Lives has its moments here and there, but not nearly enough of them to add up to a satisfying movie. [It] is most likely to be appreciated by Shores fans simply grateful to have one of his plays preserved on film".

Wesley Morris of the San Francisco Chronicle described the film quality as a "vaguely underwater look of a sunken sitcom". He ended his review with "[T]he laughs come in all the wrong places when they come at all. Shores took all this from his play, which on the stage must have been like catching a taping of the Springer show on a stupendously off day". Robert K. Elder writing for the Chicago Tribune called it "a train wreck you can't help but watch". The Globe and Mail's Rick Groen wrote: "But if the film's flaws are large, so are its laughs. Large and intermittent and unexpected -- they sneak up on you. Just as you're about to give up on the picture, as the erratic tone lurches from bald farce to strained poignancy and back again, a laugh is there again, doing what laughter does best–redeeming Sordid Lives.

== Legacy ==
Though not popular with film critics upon release, the film developed notoriety as an "unlikely cult hit" and a "cult phenomenon". A 20th anniversary stage production brought a new cast to Orlando's Parliament House from August 19, 2016, to September 3, 2016.

=== Television prequel series ===
Logo produced and aired Sordid Lives: The Series from July 2008 to October 2008. It consists of 12 episodes and is a prequel to the film. Many of the film's cast returned. However, Caroline Rhea replaced Delta Burke, and Jason Dottley replaced Kirk Geiger as Ty Williamson. Rue McClanahan was added as mother Peggy Ingram. A second season was not ordered due to legalities with producers not paying out residuals to the artists. The crew would later be awarded $2.5 million in unpaid residuals and penalties.

=== Sequel film ===
In June 2014, Del Shores announced that he was working on a sequel to the film titled A Very Sordid Wedding. Beard Collins Shores Productions launched an Indiegogo fundraising campaign to assemble the project and secure investor financing. The film is set in 2015 Winters, Texas, which is 16 years after the first film, and deals with the impact of the advancement of same-sex marriage in the conservative Southern community.

Several actors from the first film reprise their roles, including Bonnie Bedelia, Leslie Jordan, Newell Alexander, Sarah Hunley, Rosemary Alexander, Ann Walker, and Kirk Geiger. Joining them from the Sordid Lives series are: David Steen, David Cowgill, and Caroline Rhea. Original actors Beth Grant and Olivia Newton-John turned down offers to return for the sequel. While Grant's role of Sissy was recast, Newton-John's role of Bitsy Mae was written out of the script. It premiered in Palm Springs, California on March 10, 2017.
