= A Very Sordid Wedding =

2017 film by Del Shores

- Theatrical release poster
- Directed by: Del Shores
- Written by: Del Shores
- Produced by: Del Shores; Emerson Collins
- Starring: Bonnie Bedelia; Leslie Jordan; Caroline Rhea; Dale Dickey; Rosemary Alexander; Newell Alexander; David Cowgill; Kirk Geiger; Sarah Hunley; Lorna Scott; David Steen; Ann Walker
- Cinematography: Paul Suderman
- Edited by: Donna Matthewson
- Music by: Joe Patrick Ward
- Production companies: Beard Collins Shores; Buffalo Gal Pictures
- Distributed by: The Film Collaborative
- Release date: March 10, 2017 (Palm Springs)
- Running time: 109 minutes
- Country: United States
- Language: English
- Box office: $40,000 (opening day)

A Very Sordid Wedding is a 2017 comedy film and sequel to Sordid Lives (2000) and Sordid Lives: The Series (2008), written, produced and directed by Del Shores. It stars Bonnie Bedelia, Leslie Jordan, Caroline Rhea, Dale Dickey, Rosemary Alexander, Newell Alexander, David Cowgill, Kirk Geiger, Sarah Hunley, Lorna Scott, David Steen and Ann Walker.

The film had a world premiere in Palm Springs at the Camelot Theatres on March 10, 2017, grossing $40,000 and received positive reviews.

== Cast ==
- Bonnie Bedelia as Latrelle Williamson
- Caroline Rhea as Noleta Nethercott
- Leslie Jordan as Earl "Brother Boy" Ingram
- Dale Dickey as Sissy Hickey
- Newell Alexander as Wardell Owens
- Rosemary Alexander as Dr. Eve Bolinger
- David Cowgill as Odell Owens
- Kirk Geiger as Ty Williamson
- Sarah Hunley as Juanita Bartlett
- Lorna Scott as Vera
- David Steen as G.W. Nethercott
- Ann Walker as LaVonda DuPree
- Emerson Collins as Billy Joe Dobson
- Carole Cook as Hortense
- Katherine Bailess as Greta
- Michael MacRae as Wilson
- Levi Kreis as Jimmy Ray Brewton
- Scott Presley as Roger
- Aleks Paunovic as Hardy
- T. Ashanti Mozelle as Kyle
- Alec Mapa as Marty Wells
- Sharon Garrison as Mrs. Barnes
- Ron Corning as Newscaster
- Blake McIver as Peter
- Whoopi Goldberg as a priest

== Production ==
In June 2014, Del Shores announced that he had completed the script for a sequel to Sordid Lives (2000) titled, A Very Sordid Wedding. That November, Beard Collins Shores Productions launched an Indiegogo fundraising campaign to assemble the project and secure investor financing. The film is set in 2015 Winters, Texas, which is 16 years after the first film, and deals with the impact of the advancement of same-sex marriage in the conservative Southern community.

Most of the cast from the first film and TV series returned. Original actors Beth Grant and Olivia Newton-John turned down offers to return for the sequel. While Grant's role of Sissy was recast to Dale Dickey, Newton-John's role of Bitsy Mae was written out of the script.

Principal photography took place in Winnipeg and Selkirk for two weeks from May 2 to May 14, 2016.

== Release ==
The film had a world premiere in Palm Springs at the Camelot Theatres on March 10, 2017, where it grossed $40,000. It was followed by a two-week limited theater rollout by The Film Collaborative in 34 other markets.

=== Home media ===
The film was released on video on demand, DVD and Blu-ray by Gravitas Ventures on October 17, 2017. In its first week it sold 9,457 DVDs ($96,367) and 10,082 Blu-rays ($240,948). It sold an estimated total of $631,361 between both platforms.

== Reception ==
On the review aggregator website Rotten Tomatoes, 86% of 7 critics' reviews are positive, with an average rating of 7.1/10. Metacritic, which uses a weighted average, assigned the film a score of 59 out of 100, based on 4 critics, indicating "mixed or average" reviews.

Frank Scheck of The Hollywood Reporter wrote that fans of the original would enjoy the same "raucous, gay-themed humor". He wrote "Very Sordid Wedding offers some undeniably entertaining moments, and its talented ensemble, clearly encouraged to pull out all the stops, delivers their comic shtick with admirable gusto". Scott Tobias writing for Variety gave it a negative review, saying "A few of the gags land, most of them don't, but the overall rhythm is stilted and rudderless, flattened further by d.p. Paul Suderman's point-and-shoot camerawork".

Gary Goldstein of the Los Angeles Times gave a positive review, noting it was "as broad as the side of a barn but much more amusing G. Allen Johnson writing for the San Francisco Chronicle praised Shores' writing and called the film "undeniably energetic". He noted that it "descends into obvious preachiness, and from this view, the unrelenting wackiness becomes overwhelming. Still, good times are had by all".
