= David Steen (actor) =

American actor and writer (born 1954)

David Steen (born June 26, 1954) is an American playwright, actor and writer.

Steen has appeared in a number of Quentin Tarantino films including Once Upon a Time in Hollywood, Django Unchained, and Reservoir Dogs. He also appeared opposite Beth Grant, Dale Dickey, and Oscar winner Octavia Spencer in the Del Shores dramatic festival film Blues for Willadean. The film was an adaption of Shores' The Trials and Tribulations of a Trailer Trash Housewife. Steen co-wrote and produced and starred in the independent film The Corndog Man, which premiered at the Sundance Film Festival. He also had a series regular role as G. W. in Shores' cable series Sordid Lives. Steen created the role of J. D. in Shores' hit play The Trials and Tribulations of a Trailer Trash Housewife, for which he won an LA Weekly Award for Best Supporting Actor and an Ovation Award for Acting Ensemble.

Steen's first stage work as a playwright was A Gift from Heaven, which was the first play developed in the San Fernando Valley to be made into a feature film. It earned a Critic's Choice Pick from the Los Angeles Times as well as other honors including eleven Drama-Logue Awards. He followed that with Avenue A., which featured Mark Ruffalo. It received a Critic's Choice Pick and opened to sold-out performances in Los Angeles, New York and Chicago.

== Personal life ==
Until early adulthood, Steen lived in Memphis, graduating from White Station High School in 1972. He divides his time between Los Angeles and Palm Springs and is married to actress Bobbie Eakes.
