= Sordid Lives: The Series =

2008 American TV series

- DVD poster
- Genre: Comedy
- Created by: Del Shores
- Showrunner: Del Shores
- Written by: Del Shores
- Directed by: Del Shores
- Starring: Bonnie Bedelia; Beth Grant; Rue McClanahan; Olivia Newton-John; Caroline Rhea; Leslie Jordan
- Theme music composer: Margot Rose; Beverly Nero
- Opening theme: "Sordid Lives"
- Composer: Joe Patrick Ward
- Country of origin: United States
- Original language: English
- No. of seasons: 1
- No. of episodes: 12

Production
- Executive producers: Alex Fraser; Damian Ganczewski; Del Shores; Stanley M. Brooks
- Cinematography: David Sanderson
- Running time: 30 minutes (including commercials)
- Production companies: Once Upon a Time Films; Del Shores Productions; Scout Productions

Original release
- Network: Logo TV
- Release: July 23 – October 29, 2008

Related
- Sordid Lives; A Very Sordid Wedding

Sordid Lives: The Series is an American comedy television series created, written, and directed by Del Shores. It is prequel to his 2000 film, Sordid Lives. It is set in a small town of Texas and centers on the Ingram family, and stars Bonnie Bedelia, Beth Grant, Rue McClanahan, Olivia Newton-John, Caroline Rhea, Leslie Jordan, along with most of the original cast of the film.

It premiered on Logo TV in the United States in July 2008 and ended its first and only season in October 2008.

== Plot ==
In April 1998, family matriarch Peggy Ingram takes in the town bar singer Bitsy Mae Harling who has just been released from prison. Peggy's daughter LaVonda lives with Peggy's chain-smoking sister Sissy, while Peggy's good girl Latrelle maintains an image of seeming perfection. Latrelle's son Ty is an actor living in Los Angeles and struggling with several therapists to come to terms with his homosexuality.

Peggy's third child, Earl "Brother Boy" Ingram, is locked in a mental institution where he performs as Tammy Wynette. He plots to escape while he attends therapy sessions with Dr. Eve who believes she can de-homosexualize him. LaVonda's best friend Noleta lives in a trailer in Sissy's backyard with her husband G.W., a Vietnam veteran with two wooden legs. G.W. escapes regularly to the local bar in town amidst a small crowd of regulars including brothers Wardell and Odell, Bitsy Mae, and the bar's resident drunk Juanita.

== Production ==
=== Development ===
A few years after Sordid Lives (2000) was released, Del Shores published an online novel called The Sordid Saga, serving as a prequel to the film. He wrote 22 chapters (one per week) before stopping after being hired to write for Queer as Folk. When Logo TV launched in 2005, Shores' then-husband Jason Dottley suggested he pitch the novel into a TV series.

=== Casting ===
Many of the film's cast returned, however there were some changes. David Steen replaced Beau Bridges as G.W. Nethercott. Dottley replaced Kirk Geiger as Ty. Originally, Caroline Rhea signed on for guest appearance as a therapist, but after reading the script she wanted a bigger role. After Delta Burke decided not to return, Rhea took over the role of Noleta.

Rue McClanahan signed on as family matriarch Peggy. She said in an interview for the reason she accepted the role, "It was the funniest script I'd read since The Golden Girls. The same way I knew in Golden Girls I wanted to play Blanche, I knew I wanted to play Peggy. They're 180 degrees different, of course, except for one thing: They're both looking for love". She is said to have been paid more for one episode of Golden Girls than for the whole 12 episodes of Sordid Lives.

=== Filming ===
Principal photography took place on a low-budget in Shreveport, Louisiana, for 36 days between November 2007 and January 2008. Shores stated the cast worked for less than their usual fees. To save time and since all episodes were written, Shores would "block-shot it, like a movie". Leslie Jordan filmed his scenes in six days.

== Cast ==
=== Main ===
- Bonnie Bedelia as Latrelle Williamson
- Beth Grant as Sissy Hickey
- Rue McClanahan as Peggy Ingram
- Olivia Newton-John as Bitsy Mae Harling
- Caroline Rhea as Noleta Nethercott
- Leslie Jordan as Earl "Brother Boy" Ingram
- Newell Alexander as Wardell 'Bubba' Owens
- Rosemary Alexander as Dr. Eve Bolinger
- David Cowgill as Odell Owens
- Jason Dottley as Ty Williamson
- Sarah Hunley as Juanita Bartlett
- David Steen as G.W. Nethercott
- Ann Walker as LaVonda DuPree

=== Recurring ===
- Mitch Carter as Bumper
- Ted Detwiler as Jacob
- Mary Margaret Lewis as Ethel
- Sharron Alexis as Sara Kaufman
- T. Ashanti Mozelle as Vegas
- Robert Lewis Stephenson as Marc/Hunter
- Craig Taggart as Craig Stephen
- Allison Tolman as Tink
- Katherine Bailess as nurse Waring
- Chris Pudlo as Conroy
- Joe Patrick Ward as Marshall
- Lorna Scott as Vera
- Emerson Collins as Max
- Tate Taylor as Richie
- Cassie Shea Watson as Saline
- Scott Presley as Roger
- Bob Downs as Reverend Barnes
- Sharon Garrison as Mrs. Barnes
- Susan Leslie as Jackie
- Liz Mikel as Maggie

=== Special guest stars ===
- Dale Dickey as Glyndora
- Georgette Jones as Tammy Wynette
- Bobbie Eakes as Daniella
- Margaret Cho as therapist #17
- Carson Kressley as therapist #18
- Candis Cayne as therapist #19

== Episodes ==
No.	Title	Original release date
1	"The Day Tammy Wynette Died, Part 1"	July 23, 2008
2	"The Day Tammy Wynette Died, Part 2"	July 30, 2008
3	"Pills, Poison & Penises"	August 6, 2008
4	"Secrets and Lies"	August 13, 2008
5	"The Fall and Rise of Brother Boy"	August 20, 2008
6	"Call Waiting"	September 10, 2008
7	"An Audacious Affair"	September 17, 2008
8	"Guess Who's Coming to Bubba's"	September 24, 2008
9	"Those Pesky Little Stalkers"	October 1, 2008
10	"Desperately Seeking Ty"	October 8, 2008
11	"Compromising Situations"	October 22, 2008
12	"The Trip"	October 29, 2008

== Release ==
Logo TV aired Sordid Lives: The Series with 12 episodes from July 22, 2008, to October 21, 2008. Well Go USA released the complete series on DVD and Blu-ray in the United States on January 11, 2011.

A second season was not ordered due to legalities with producers not paying out residuals to the artists. The crew would later be awarded $2.5 million in unpaid residuals and penalties.

== Reception ==
Metacritic, which uses a weighted average, assigned the series a score of 65 out of 100, based on 6 reviews, indicating "generally favorable reviews".

Barry Garron from The Hollywood Reporter gave a positive review, "Sordid Lives plays out like a white trash daytime drama on steroids. In each episode, outrageous things happen to outrageous characters, often producing outrageous laughs". He described it as "Mama's Family meets Will and Grace". The Boston Globe's Matthew Gilbert wrote that the series "has a decidedly amateurish tone, with shoddy production values and acting that shows some seams. But the tone works in the show's favor".
