= Her Costly Affair =

- Genre: Thriller
- Written by: Carmen Culver
- Directed by: John Patterson
- Starring: Bonnie Bedelia; Brian Austin Green
- Music by: Michael Hoenig
- Country of origin: United States
- Original language: English

Production
- Executive producers: Carmen Culver; Peter Frankovich; Sheldon Pinchuk
- Producer: Ed Lahti
- Cinematography: Mark W. Gray
- Editor: Michael Kewley
- Running time: 96 minutes
- Production companies: Carmen Culver Films; Peter Frankovich Productions; Finnegan/Pinchuk Productions

Original release
- Network: NBC
- Release: October 28, 1996

Her Costly Affair is a 1996 American made-for-television thriller film directed by John Patterson. The film was initially to be released as Consensual Relations, until lead actress Bonnie Bedelia had it changed. Filming took place in Southern California.

== Plot ==
Dr. Diane Weston is a college professor who teaches English literature. Not entirely happy with her life, she trusts a colleague Sally with her desire of an adventurous life. Because she is not getting a lot of sympathy from her husband Carl and teenage daughter Tess, she isn't bothered with the special attention of Jeff. Jeff is a transfer student he moved after the mysterious death of his girlfriend. He immediately falls in love with Diane and explains that she reminds him of his former girlfriend. She initially denies his attempts to seduce her and focuses on recapturing the passion with her husband. However, when he cancels a romantic trip with her to attend a tennis match with Tess, she agrees to accompany Jeff on a trip.

Unwantedly feeling attracted to him, she agrees to sleep with him, but soon regrets this decision. She immediately ends their affair, but he isn't willing to stop seeing her and shows aggressive behavior. Diane soon notices that he is stalking her and he even goes as far as raping her at a public library. She later threatens to step to the police, but he responds by saying he will tell Carl about their affair if she does. Because he is continuing to harass her, she starts to collect information about his past. She eventually finds out that the death of his girlfriend Ann was a suicide, although Jeff was the prime suspect of murder for a long time. She is further on shocked to hear that Ann was his college professor.

Afraid of what will happen, she admits the whole story to Sally, who advises her to admit what happened to Carl. Later that day, she finds out that Jeff dropped out of college and moved town. Diane finally thinks her life will turn back to normal, until it turns out that Tess' new boyfriend Jack is actually Jeff. She threatens to kill him if he ever sees Tess again and later forbids her from spending time with him, which only leads to an estrangement. The next day, she pretends to be in love with him to help him get counseling, but finds out later that day that he went into the woods with Carl and Tess to go shooting. Worried about them, she admits everything to Carl upon their return. Upset, Carl sends her away and she is soon harassed by Jeff. She tries to run away to a rooftop, but he catches her and admits to the murder of Ann. They threaten to fall off, but are rescued by Carl and Sally. In the end, Jeff is arrested and Diane reunites with Carl.

== Cast ==
- Bonnie Bedelia as Dr. Diane Weston
- Brian Austin Green as Jeff Dante
- Joe Spano as Carl Weston
- Gina Philips as Tess Weston
- Steven Gilborn as Dr. Sorenson
- Roma Maffia as Sally Canter
- Andrew Craig as Matt
- Ron Brooks as Bob
- Gene Wolande as Don
- Zar Acayan as Ray
- David Ramsey as Shep Walker
- William Bassett as Ed Baines
- Benito Martinez as Campus Cop
- Taylor Sheridan as Chris
- Amy Smart as Dee
- Jeanne Sakata as Mrs. Beals
- Laurie Fortier as Liz
- Amanda Carlin as Jeannette
- Chris Ellis as Wes
- David Quittman as Johnny
