= Bonnie Bedelia =

American actress (born 1948)

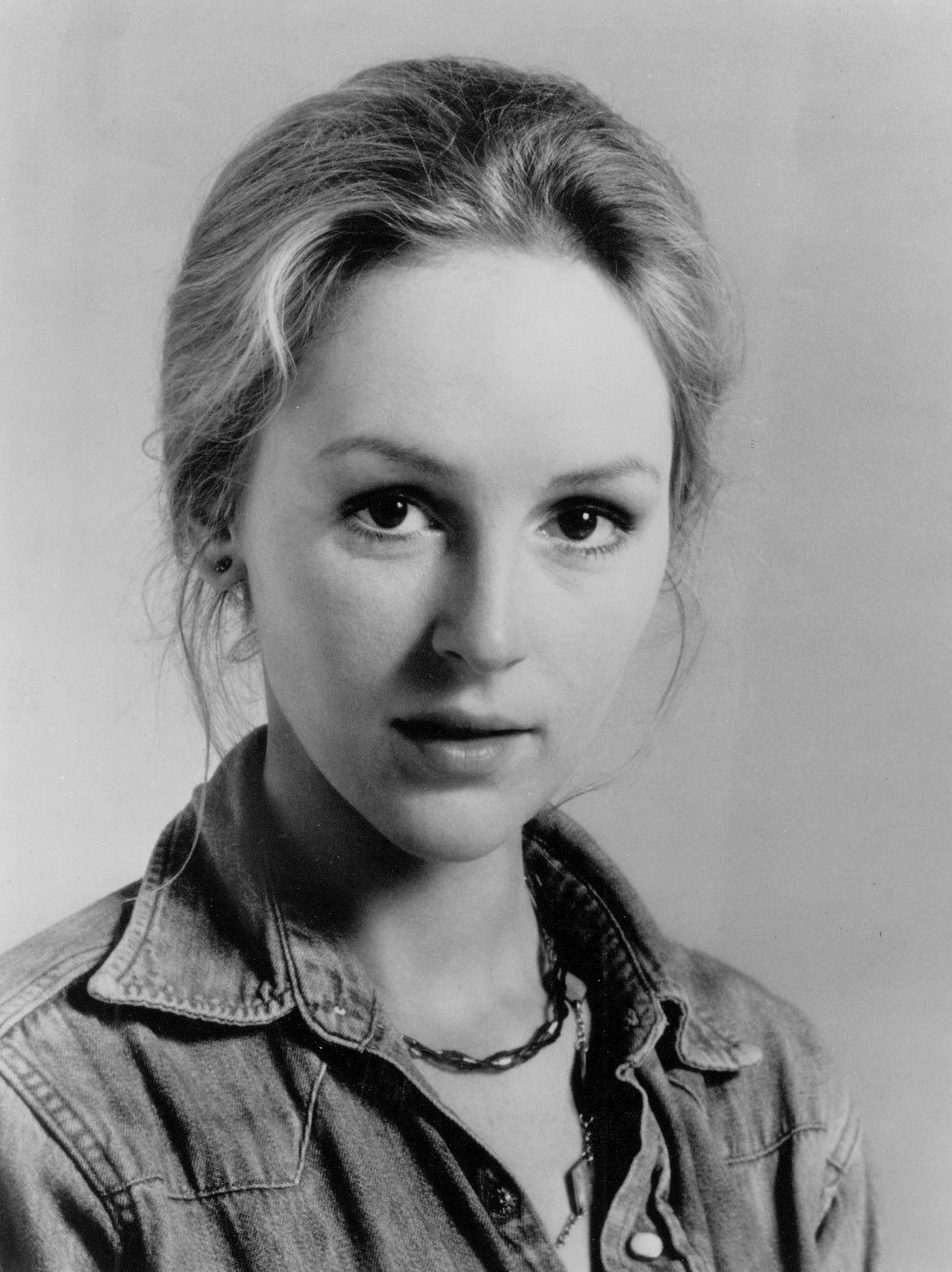
- Bedelia in The New Land (1974)
- Born: Bonnie Bedelia Culkin; March 25, 1948 (age 78); New York City, U.S.
- Occupation: Actress
- Years active: 1958–present
- Spouses: Ken Luber (m. 1969; div. 1980) Michael MacRae (m. 1995)
- Children: 2
- Relatives: Kit Culkin (brother); Macaulay Culkin (nephew); Kieran Culkin (nephew); Rory Culkin (nephew)

Bonnie Bedelia Culkin (born March 25, 1948) is an American actress. After beginning her career in theatre in the 1960s, Bedelia starred in the CBS daytime soap opera Love of Life and made her film debut in The Gypsy Moths. Bedelia subsequently appeared in the films They Shoot Horses, Don't They?, Lovers and Other Strangers, Heart Like a Wheel, The Prince of Pennsylvania, Die Hard, Presumed Innocent, Sordid Lives, and Needful Things.

For her television work, Bedelia has earned two Emmy Awards nominations. From 2001 to 2004, Bedelia played the lead role in the Lifetime television drama series The Division. She also starred as family matriarch Camille Braverman in the NBC family drama series Parenthood (2010–15).

== Early life ==
Bedelia was born in New York City, the daughter of Marian Ethel (née Wagner), a writer and editor, and Philip Harley Culkin, who was in public relations and 50 years old at the time. She was born in a difficult financial period when her father's firm went bankrupt, and they lived in a cold-water tenement flat. Her mother died when she was 14, and her father, who always had ulcers, spent a year in hospital following her death. She has two brothers, one of whom is actor Kit Culkin, and an older sister, Candice Culkin. She is the aunt of actors Macaulay, Kieran, and Rory Culkin.

Bedelia studied dance in her youth, at School of American Ballet. She received her acting training at HB Studio.

== Career ==
Before becoming an actress, Bedelia studied ballet and appeared in a few productions with the New York City Ballet, including The Nutcracker. Her only dancing role onscreen was that of Clara in the Playhouse 90 television production of the George Balanchine Nutcracker (1958). (By that time she had begun using just her first and middle name.)

From 1961 to 1967, Bedelia was a regular on the CBS soap opera Love of Life, portraying Sandy Porter. She also worked on Broadway, where she debuted supporting Patty Duke in 1962, in Isle of Children, and won a Theatre World Award for playing the lead of in My Sweet Charlie, in 1966.

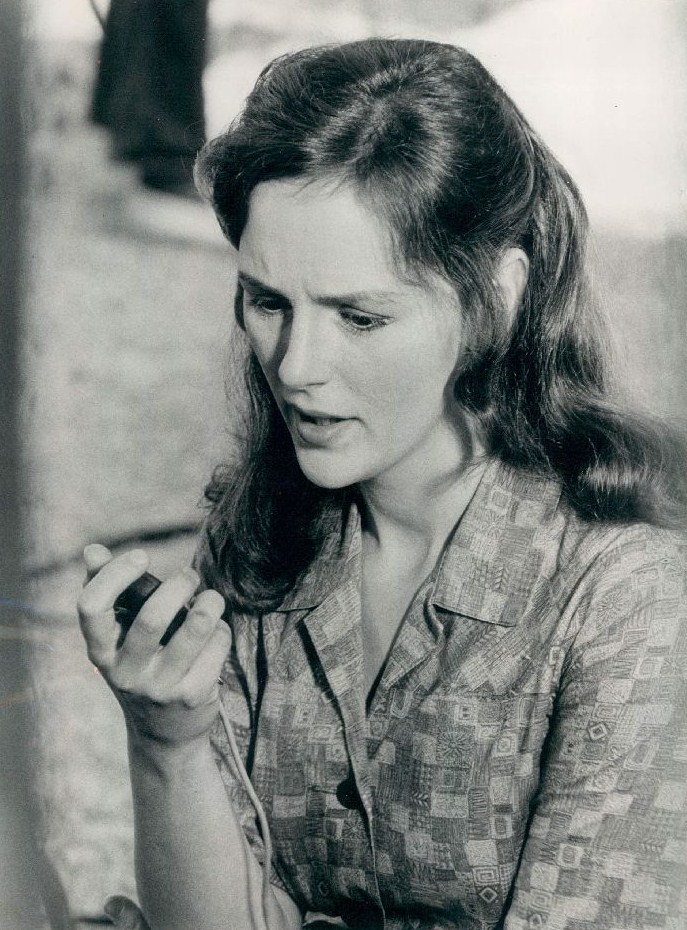
Bedelia in the made-for-TV film Message to My Daughter (1973)

Bedelia made her film debut in The Gypsy Moths in 1969; later that year she attracted attention as the pregnant marathon dancer in They Shoot Horses, Don't They? She starred in the comedy Lovers and Other Strangers (1970), had dramatic roles in The Strange Vengeance of Rosalie (1972), Bonanza (1972), and Between Friends (1973), and appeared opposite Richard Dreyfuss in the comedy The Big Fix (1978). On television she played the leading role in the short-lived ABC drama series, The New Land (1974).

In 1984, Bedelia received critical acclaim and was nominated for a Golden Globe for her starring role in Heart Like a Wheel (1983), as drag racer Shirley Muldowney. Other well-known performances include her portrayals of Holly Gennero McClane, the wife of Bruce Willis's character John McClane in Die Hard (1988) and Die Hard 2 (1990), and of Barbara Sabich, the wife of Harrison Ford's character in Presumed Innocent (1990).

Bedelia appeared in two Stephen King screen adaptations: Salem's Lot (1979) and Needful Things (1993). She was nominated for Emmy Awards for her performance in the Showtime anthology series Fallen Angels (1993) and for the leading role in the made-for-television movie Locked in Silence (1999). She played a number of leading roles in television films and miniseries, such as Switched at Birth, A Mother's Right: The Elizabeth Morgan Story, Her Costly Affair, and Picnic. From 2001 to 2004, Bedelia starred as Capt. Kate McCafferty in the Lifetime television drama series The Division. She later guest-starred in Big Love and CSI: Crime Scene Investigation, and starred opposite Rue McClanahan and Olivia Newton-John in the 2008 sitcom Sordid Lives: The Series.

Bedelia starred in the NBC drama series Parenthood (2010–15) as the family matriarch, Camille Braverman.

In 2017, she appeared in season 2 of the ABC crime drama series Designated Survivor, and in two Hallmark movies. In 2019, she guest starred on the Netflix series What/If.

== Personal life ==
Bedelia married scriptwriter Ken Luber on April 24, 1969. The couple had two sons, before divorcing in 1980. She wed actor Michael MacRae in 1995.

== Filmography ==
=== Film ===
Year	Title	Role	Notes
1969	The Gypsy Moths	Annie Burke	
1969	They Shoot Horses, Don't They?	Ruby Bates	
1970	Lovers and Other Strangers	Susan Henderson	
1972	In Pursuit of Treasure		
1972	The Strange Vengeance of Rosalie	Rosalie	
1973	Between Friends	Ellie	
1978	The Big Fix	Suzanne	
1983	Heart Like a Wheel	Shirley Muldowney	
1986	Death of an Angel	Deacon Grace McKenzie	
1986	Violets Are Blue	Ruth Squires	
1986	The Boy Who Could Fly	Charlene Michaelson	
1987	Like Father Like Son	Lady with Gum in Hair	
1987	The Stranger	Alice Kildee	
1988	The Prince of Pennsylvania	Pam Marshetta	
1988	Die Hard	Holly Gennaro McClane	
1989	Fat Man and Little Boy	Kitty Oppenheimer	
1990	Die Hard 2	Holly Gennaro McClane	
1990	Presumed Innocent	Barbara Sabich	
1993	Needful Things	Polly Chalmers	
1994	Speechless	Annette	
1994	Judicial Consent	Gwen Warwick	
1997	Bad Manners	Nancy Westlund	
1999	Gloria	Brenda	
1999	Anywhere But Here	Carol	
2000	Sordid Lives	Latrelle Williamson	
2003	Manhood	Alice	
2005	Berkeley	Hawkins	
2013	Munchausen	Mother	Short
2016	Broken Links	Melanie	
2017	A Very Sordid Wedding	Latrelle Williamson	
2017	The Scent of Rain and Lightning	Annabelle	
2019	A Stone in the Water	Martha	
2021	Violet	Aunt Helen	
2022	The Noel Diary	Ellie Foster	
2023	The Hill	Gram	

=== Television films ===
Year	Title	Role	Notes
1968	The High Chaperral	Tina Granger	
1969	Then Came Bronson	Temple Brooks	
1972	Sandcastles	Jenna Hampshire	
1973	A Time for Love	Kitty	
1973	Message to My Daughter	Janet Thatcher	
1974	Heatwave!	Laura Taylor	
1978	A Question of Love	Joan Saltzman	
1979	Walking Through the Fire	Dr. Rand	
1979	Salem's Lot	Susan Norton	Miniseries
1980	Tourist	Mandy Burke	
1980	Fighting Back: The Rocky Bleier Story	Aleta	
1982	Million Dollar Infield	Marcia Miller	
1983	Memorial Day	Cass	
1985	The Lady from Yesterday	Janet Weston	
1986	Alex: The Life of a Child	Carole Deford	
1987	When the Time Comes	Liddy Travis	
1990	Somebody Has to Shoot the Picture	Hannah McGrath	
1991	Switched at Birth	Regina Twigg	
1992	A Mother's Right: The Elizabeth Morgan Story	Elizabeth Morgan	
1993	The Fire Next Time	Suzanne Morgan	
1995	Legacy of Sin: The William Coit Story	Jill Coit	
1995	Shadow of a Doubt	Robin Harwell	
1996	Homecoming	Eunice Logan	
1996	A Season in Purgatory	Valerie Sabbath	Miniseries
1996	Her Costly Affair	Dr. Diane Weston	
1997	Any Mother's Son	Dorothy Hajdys	
1998	To Live Again	Iris Sayer	
1999	Locked in Silence	Lydia	
2000	Flowers for Algernon	Rose	
2000	Picnic	Flo Owens	
2017	A Joyous Christmas	Joy	
2017	Christmas on the Coast	Ellie Cassadine	
2022	The Noel Diary	Ellie Foster	

=== Television series ===
Year	Title	Role	Notes
1958	Playhouse 90	Clara	Episode: "The Nutcracker"
1961–1967	Love of Life	Sandy Porter	Main role
1964	East Side/West Side	Linda Stuart	Episode: "The $5.98 Dress"
1968	Judd, for the Defense	Ellie	Episode: "The Death Farm"
1968	The High Chaparral	Tina Granger	Episode: "The Deceivers"
1969	Then Came Bronson	Temple Brooks	Episode: "Pilot"
1969, 1972	Bonanza	Laurie Mansfield /Alice Harper	Episodes: "The Unwanted" & "Forever"
1973	Hawkins	Edith Dayton-Thomas	Episode: "Death and the Maiden"
1973	Love Story	Alice Hartman	Episode: "Love Came Laughing"
1974	The New Land	Anna Larsen	Main role
1993	Fallen Angels	Sally Creighton	Episode: "The Quiet Room"
1996	The Outer Limits	Nancy McDonald	Episode: "Worlds Apart"
2001–2004	The Division	Capt. Kate McCafferty	Main role
2007	Big Love	Virginia "Ginger" Heffman	Episode: "Good Guys and Bad Guys"
2008	CSI: Crime Scene Investigation	DDA Madeline Klein	Episode: "Grissom's Divine Comedy"
2008	Sordid Lives: The Series	Latrelle Williamson	Main role
2010–2015	Parenthood	Camille Braverman	Main role
2017	Designated Survivor	Eva Booker	5 episodes
2019	What/If	Margaret Denner	Episode: "What Secrets"
2021	Panic	Anne McCarthy	Recurring role

== Awards and nominations ==
Year	Award	Category	Work	Result
1967	Theatre World Award	Theatre World Award	My Sweet Charlie	Won
1984	Golden Globe Award	Best Actress – Motion Picture Drama	Heart Like a Wheel	Nominated
1989	Independent Spirit Awards	Best Supporting Female	The Prince of Pennsylvania	Nominated
1994	Emmy Award	Outstanding Guest Actress in a Drama Series	Fallen Angels	Nominated
1997	CableACE Award	Outstanding Actress in a Movie or Miniseries	Any Mother's Son	Nominated
1999	Lone Star Film & Television Awards	Best TV Actress	To Live Again	Won
2000	Emmy Award	Outstanding Actress in a Movie or Miniseries	Locked in Silence	Nominated
2012	Ojai Film Festival	Lifetime Achievement Award		Won
2017	FilmOut Festival Award	Best Actress	A Very Sordid Wedding	Won
