= The Grave White Way =

The Grave White Way is a musical theatre stage play written by Joe Patrick Ward. The show follows five dead stage actors attempting to gain admittance to Heaven by performing an afterlife-revue of the disastrous musicals that condemned them to the musical theatre purgatory known as "The Grave White Way".

== Plot ==
The play is a celebration of Broadway musical flops, and creates an alter-universe of skewed Broadway history complete with fictitious shows, composers, lyricists, directors and producers. Some of the imagined musical disasters in "The Grave White Way" include the 70's rock opera "Nazareth High" depicting Jesus's lesser-known high school years; "Hey Helen!", the toe-tapping musical version of The Miracle Worker; a Sondheim-inspired retelling of the cannibalistic Donner Party called "Winter in the Woods With Donner", and a failed precursor to Oklahoma! called "Wichita!", featuring the jaunty opening number "Goin' to the Cockfights".

== Productions ==
The play was first staged in 2001 at the Hudson Backstage Theatre in Los Angeles, before it began opening in other cities. The show's original cast included Lesli Margherita, Shannon Stoeke, Joshua Finkel, Amy Rutberg, Craig A. Curtis and Joe Patrick Ward. The musical also featured guest appearances by many renowned musical celebrities such as John Raitt, Stephen Schwartz, Billy Porter, Loretta Devine, Ken Page, Yeardley Smith, Gregory Jbara, and Jason Graae, all who played along with the joke and sang original off-kilter, pastiche showtunes. The producers of the original production were Jayson Raitt, Michael Weiner, and Alan Zachary. The show's director was Sarah Gurfield, with choreography by Kay Cole.

The Los Angeles production received mixed reviews.
