= Prison of Secrets =

1997 American television film

- DVD cover
- Written by: Layce Gardner
- Directed by: Fred Gerber
- Starring: Stephanie Zimbalist
- Music by: Nan Schwartz
- Country of origin: United States
- Original language: English

Production
- Cinematography: John Fleckenstein
- Editor: Lisa M. Citron
- Running time: 92 minutes
- Production companies: Hearst Entertainment; Lionsgate

Original release
- Release: March 16, 1997

Prison of Secrets is a 1997 American television film directed by Fred Gerber. The film is based on a true story and focuses on a female prison inmate who fights for women's rights while still in jail.

== Plot ==
Lynn Schaffer is a loving mother and wife, who gets arrested for a crime she did not realize she had committed. She does not take the arrest seriously at first. Viewing herself as innocent, she goes against the advice of her lawyer to take a plea-bargain. Instead she opts for a trial. Coming as a complete surprise to her, she is convicted, receives the maximum sentence of 10 years and is sent to a women's prison, leaving behind her husband Larry and daughter Carey. In prison, she has difficulty adjusting to not having any privacy and having to deal with drug addicts and prostitutes but soon finds out that the prison is corrupt, with Sergeant Ed Crang and other prison guards often sexually abusing inmates.

Lynn is determined to stop this, but Larry advises her to not interfere, pointing out that she could be free soon on probation. Lynn tries to take his advice, knowing that tough Angie and Betsy are the only people who are raped. However, when Frannie, one of the few women Lynn befriended, becomes the third victim, she realizes that nobody is safe and decides to fight back. With the help of her husband, who runs a radio station, she informs the media about the corruption.

Sergeant Crang, determined to keep Lynn silent, watches her every move, prohibits her from receiving visits from her husband and even physically assaults her. To collect proof, Lynn tries to convince fellow inmates to support her, but at first no one is willing to cooperate because they are either afraid of Crang or Angie, who forces the girls to remain silent. Angie has always been profiting from the corrupt system, getting drugs from the police and being released on supervision once a week to prostitute herself.

In the end, Lynn receives a file from a sympathetic female guard with all the evidence she needs. When a senator visits to investigate the rape accusations, Crang and Angie try to keep Lynn from giving the materials to the senator, but with the help of fellow inmates and the female guard, Sheila, Lynn is able to reach the senator. Eventually, more than 20 guards are fired and replaced by female guards. Lynn is allowed to serve the rest of her sentence on house arrest.

== Cast ==
- Stephanie Zimbalist as Lynn Schaffer
- Finola Hughes as Angie
- Gary Frank as Larry Schaffer
- Rusty Schwimmer as Carla
- Dan Lauria as Sergeant Ed Crang
- Kimberly Russell as Frannie
- Stephanie Sawyer as Carey Schaffer
- Paige Moss as Betsy
- Dale Dickey as Lynn’s friend
