= Million Dollar Quartet (musical) =

Jukebox musical

- Music: Various Artists
- Lyrics: Various Artists
- Book: Colin Escott; Floyd Mutrux
- Productions: 2006 Florida; 2010 Broadway; 2011 West End; 2011 US tour

Million Dollar Quartet is a jukebox musical with a book by Colin Escott and Floyd Mutrux. It dramatizes the Million Dollar Quartet recording session of December 4, 1956 among early rock and roll/country stars who recorded at Sun Studio in Memphis, which are Elvis Presley, Johnny Cash, Carl Perkins and newcomer Jerry Lee Lewis. The musical opened on Broadway in 2010, after several tryouts and regional productions, and spawned a 2011 West End production.

== Productions ==
=== Florida and Washington (2006–2008) ===
The musical premiered at Florida's Seaside Music Theatre, running from November 9 to December 4, 2006, and was then staged at the Village Theatre in Issaquah, Washington, in September through October 2007, and Everett, Washington, in January 2008, breaking box office records.

=== Chicago (2008–2016) ===
The musical had a limited run at Chicago's Goodman Theatre, opening on September 27, 2008. Mutrux co-directed the Chicago production with Eric D. Schaeffer, Artistic Director of Virginia's Signature Theatre. The show transferred to Chicago's Apollo Theater where it opened on October 31, 2008. It celebrated its 2500th performance on September 20, 2014., The show closed on January 17, 2016 and ranked as the third-longest running show, in terms of calendar span, in Chicago Theatre history (behind Co-Ed Prison Sluts and Shear Madness).

The cast featured David Lago as Elvis Presley, Gabe Bowling as Carl Perkins, Sean Sullivan as Johnny Cash, Lance Lipinsky as Jerry Lee Lewis, Tim Decker as Sam Phillips, and Kelly Lamont as Dyanne.

=== Broadway (2010–2011) ===
The Broadway production premiered at the Nederlander Theatre on April 11, 2010, with a cast featuring Eddie Clendening as Elvis Presley, Lance Guest as Johnny Cash, Levi Kreis as Jerry Lee Lewis, Robert Britton Lyons as Carl Perkins and Hunter Foster as Sam Phillips. The Broadway cast also included Elizabeth Stanley as "Dyanne", who in the show accompanies Elvis Presley to the Sun Records studio and sings "Fever" and "I Hear You Knocking", as well as provides back-up vocals. The original Broadway cast also included Corey Kaiser as Jay Perkins on bass and Larry Lelli as Fluke the drummer. Again directed by Eric Schaeffer, the scenic design is by Derek McLane, costume design is by Jane Greenwood, and lighting design by Howell Binkley.

The musical was nominated for three 2010 Tony Awards: Best Musical, Best Book of a Musical and Best Featured Actor in a Musical for Levi Kreis. Kreis won the award for Best Featured Actor for his portrayal of Jerry Lee Lewis.

The original cast recording was released in 2010.

The musical closed on June 12, 2011 after having played 489 performances and 34 previews. The production opened Off-Broadway at the New World Stages in July 2011.

=== West End (2011–2012) ===
Million Dollar Quartet: The Musical opened in the West End at the Noël Coward Theatre on February 28, 2011, with previews from February 8.

The original cast featured Bill Ward as Sam Phillips, Ben Goddard as Jerry Lee Lewis, Derek Hagen as Johnny Cash, Francesca Jackson as Dyanne, Robert Britton Lyons as Carl Perkins (However, from March 2011, he was replaced by Oliver Seymour-Marsh who was originally the first understudy for the same role), and Michael Malarkey as Elvis Presley. This production is again directed by Schaeffer with orchestrations and arrangements by Chuck Mead.

The show closed in London on January 14, 2012, having previously been booking until October 27, 2012.

=== Off-Broadway (2011–2012) ===
The musical transferred to New World Stages in July 2011. The show had struggled at the box office in final months of the Broadway production, taking in $242,786 out of a potential $1,109,700 and playing to 36.76% of capacity for the week ending June 5, 2011. The cast for Million Dollar Quartet at New World Stages features Eric Stang (Jerry Lee Lewis), Eddie Clendening (Elvis Presley), Lance Guest (Johnny Cash), Robert Britton Lyons (Carl Perkins), Victoria Matlock (Dyanne), James Moye (Sam Phillips), Corey Kaiser (Jay Perkins) and Don Peretz (Fluke). The production closed on June 24, 2012.

=== U.S. tour (2011–) ===
A United States national tour of the musical began in October 2011 at the Palace Theatre at Playhouse Square in Cleveland, Ohio. The tour cast features Derek Keeling as Johnny Cash, Cody Slaughter as Elvis Presley, Martin Kaye as Jerry Lee Lewis, Lee Ferris as Carl Perkins, Christopher Ryan Grant as Sam Phillips, Kelly Lamont as Dyanne, Billy Shaffer as Fluke and Chuck Zayas as Jay Perkins. The national tour visited Appleton Fox Cities, Portland, Miami, Houston, Indianapolis, Memphis, Las Vegas, Los Angeles, Tempe, Salt Lake City, Seattle, San Jose, and many more.

=== Original Canadian cast (2016) ===
The Million Dollar Quartet original Canadian cast premiered at the Chemainus Theatre Festival on February 12, 2016. It ran through March 26th, 2016. It featured Alexander Baerg as Elvis Presley, Dan Kosub as Carl Perkins, Montgomery Bjornson as Jerry Lee Lewis, Jonas Shandel as Johnny Cash, Leon Willey as Sam Phillips, Meaghan Chenosky as Dyanne, Scott Carmichael as Fluke, and Kraig Waye as Brother Jay.

West End (2026-27)

In August 2026 it was announced that The Million Dollar Quartet would be transferring to the West End for a limited run at The Arts at Marble Arch. The production, directed by Jonathan O'Boyle with choreography by Joanna Goodwin, originally ran from 15 June - 22 August at The Barn Theatre in Cirencester.

== Synopsis ==
On December 4, 1956, Johnny Cash, Jerry Lee Lewis, Carl Perkins and Elvis Presley assemble at the Sun Record recording studio in Memphis, Tennessee.

Established performer Carl Perkins was there to record songs with a new performer, Jerry Lee Lewis. Elvis Presley stops by the studio along with his girlfriend, a singer named Dyanne (at the real session, Elvis’ girlfriend was a dancer, Marilyn Evans—now Riehl). Johnny Cash has stopped by to talk to recording impresario Sam Phillips. They soon have a jam session together. Phillips attempts to re-sign Johnny Cash to a new contract, unaware he has already signed with Columbia Records. Typically, as a member from the Quartet enters for the first time, he sings a verse of one of his most famous songs, followed by an onstage freeze of all actors. During this time Sam Phillips relates to the audience how he first discovered the boy, and a brief, few line scene of that moment occurs between Philips and the musician, followed by Sam Phillips asking the boy to play something for him, which is the next verse of the song, and everyone unfreezes.

The show is performed without an intermission.

At the end of the show, the traditional announcement is made that "Elvis has left the building".

== Casts and characters ==
Character	Chicago	Broadway	West End	West End
Character	2008	2010	2011	2026
Sam Phillips	Tim Decker	Hunter Foster	Bill Ward	Darren Day
Jerry Lee Lewis	Lance Lipinsky	Levi Kreis	Ben Goddard	Joe Bence
Carl Perkins	Gabe Bowlings	Robert Britton Lyons	Robert Britton Lyons	Joey Bradick
Johnny Cash	Sean Sullivan	Lance Guest	Derek Hagen	Christopher Erasmus
Elvis Presley	David Lago	Eddie Clendening	Michael Malarkey	Connor Payne
Dyanne	Kelly Lamont	Elizabeth Stanley	Francesca Jackson	Jenay Naima

=== Characters ===
- Carl Perkins
- Johnny Cash
- Jerry Lee Lewis
- Elvis Presley
- Sam Phillips (producer and founder of Sun Records)
- Jay Perkins (bass, brother of Carl Perkins)
- W. S. "Fluke" Holland (drummer)
- Dyanne

== Musical numbers ==
- Blue Suede Shoes (Music and Lyrics By Carl L. Perkins) – Company
- Real Wild Child (Music and Lyrics By Johnny O'Keefe, John Greenan and Dave Owens) – Jerry Lee Lewis
- Matchbox (Music and Lyrics By Carl L. Perkins) – Carl Perkins
- Who Do You Love? (Music and Lyrics By Ellas McDaniel) – Carl Perkins
- Folsom Prison Blues (Music and Lyrics By John R. Cash) – Johnny Cash
- Fever (Music and Lyrics By Eddie Cooley and Otis Blackwell) – Dyanne
- Memories Are Made of This (Music and Lyrics By Terry Gilkyson, Richard Dehr and Frank Miller) – Elvis Presley
- That's All Right (Music and Lyrics By Arthur Crudup) – Elvis Presley
- Brown Eyed Handsome Man (Music and Lyrics By Chuck Berry) – Company
- Down by the Riverside – Company
- Sixteen Tons (Music and Lyrics By Merle Travis) – Johnny Cash
- My Babe (Music and Lyrics By Willie Dixon) – Carl Perkins
- Long Tall Sally (Music and Lyrics By Robert Blackwell, Enotris Johnson and Richard Penniman) – Elvis Presley
- Peace in the Valley (Music and Lyrics By Thomas A. Dorsey) – Company
- I Walk the Line (Music and Lyrics By John R. Cash) – Johnny Cash
- I Hear You Knocking (Music and Lyrics By Dave Bartholomew and Pearl King) – Dyanne
- Party (Music and Lyrics By Jessie Mae Robinson) – Carl Perkins and Company
- Great Balls of Fire (Music and Lyrics By Otis Blackwell and Jack Hammer) – Jerry Lee Lewis
- Down by the Riverside (Reprise) – Company
- Hound Dog (Music and Lyrics By Jerry Leiber and Mike Stoller) – Elvis Presley
- Ghost Riders (Music and Lyrics By Stan Jones) – Johnny Cash
- See You Later Alligator (Music and Lyrics By Robert Guidry) – Carl Perkins
- Whole Lotta Shakin' Goin' On (Music and Lyrics By Curly Williams) – Jerry Lee Lewis

=== Notable celebrity performers ===
Several notable performers have joined the cast of the show for the encore, including: Melissa Etheridge on June 23, 2010, Jerry Lee Lewis on September 10, 2010, Lesley Gore on October 28, 2010, and Ray Benson on November 16, 2010.

== Reception ==
Million Dollar Quartet received mixed reviews from critics (the average grade of 28 major reviews was a "B").

The New York Times reviewer wrote that "There's a lot to like about this relatively scrappy variation on a familiar theme. 'Million Dollar Quartet' has a pleasing modesty, taking place as it does on a single afternoon, Dec. 4, 1956, in the rattletrap recording studio of Sun Records in Memphis...The actors portraying these pioneers... don’t just play the roles but play the music too. Gifted musicians and likable performers, they tackle with no apparent discomfort the unenviable chore of impersonating some of the most revered names in pop music, from their slick pompadours right down to their frisky, agile fingertips."

In a summary of the Broadway reviews, the Backstage reviewer noted: "When the curtain call is the most exciting part of a show, it's definitely a problem. Such is the case with "Million Dollar Quartet", the latest attempt to turn pop nostalgia into Broadway box-office gold." The New York Magazine reviewer commented "The actors—all four of them crackerjack singers and musicians—distill the essence of their real-life counterparts without succumbing to excessive caricature."

== Awards and nominations ==
=== Original Broadway production ===
Year	Award Ceremony	Category	Nominee	Result
2010	Tony Award	Best Musical		Nominated
2010	Tony Award	Best Book of a Musical	Colin Escott and Floyd Mutrux	Nominated
2010	Tony Award	Best Featured Actor in a Musical	Levi Kreis	Won
2010	Drama Desk Award	Outstanding Musical Revue		Nominated
2010	Outer Critics Circle Award	Outstanding Featured Actor in a Musical	Levi Kreis	Won
2010	Drama League Award	Distinguished Production of a Musical		Nominated
