= Blues for Willadean =

- Directed by: Del Shores
- Screenplay by: Del Shores
- Based on: The Trials and Tribulations of a Trailer Trash Housewife by Del Shores
- Produced by: Emerson Collins; Beth Grant; Robert L. Rearden III; Robert L. Rearden Jr.; Del Shores
- Starring: Beth Grant; Octavia Spencer
- Cinematography: David Sanderson
- Edited by: Luis Colina
- Music by: Joe Patrick Ward
- Production companies: Del Shores Productions; Big Leap Productions
- Distributed by: Kestrel Films
- Release date: October 2012
- Country: United States
- Language: English

Blues for Willadean is a 2012 American drama film written and directed by Del Shores and starring Beth Grant and Octavia Spencer. It is based on Shores’ 2003 play The Trials and Tribulations of a Trailer Trash Housewife.

== Plot ==
The story is about Willadean, a woman who explores the shame, emotions and privacy of battered women. A film mixed with drama, humor, pain but which offers just hope to abused women. Willadean, wife of a truck driver, tries to escape from the small prison she built thanks to a friend and friend LaSonia who is always close to her and is a blues singer and encourages her with music.

== Cast ==
- Beth Grant as Willadean Winkler
- Octavia Spencer as LaSonia Robinson
- Dale Dickey as Rayleen Hobbs
- David Steen as J.D. Winkler
- Debby Holiday as Blues Singer
- Louise Beard as Mrs. Garrison

== Production ==
The film was shot in Atlanta.
