= Dale Dickey =

American actress

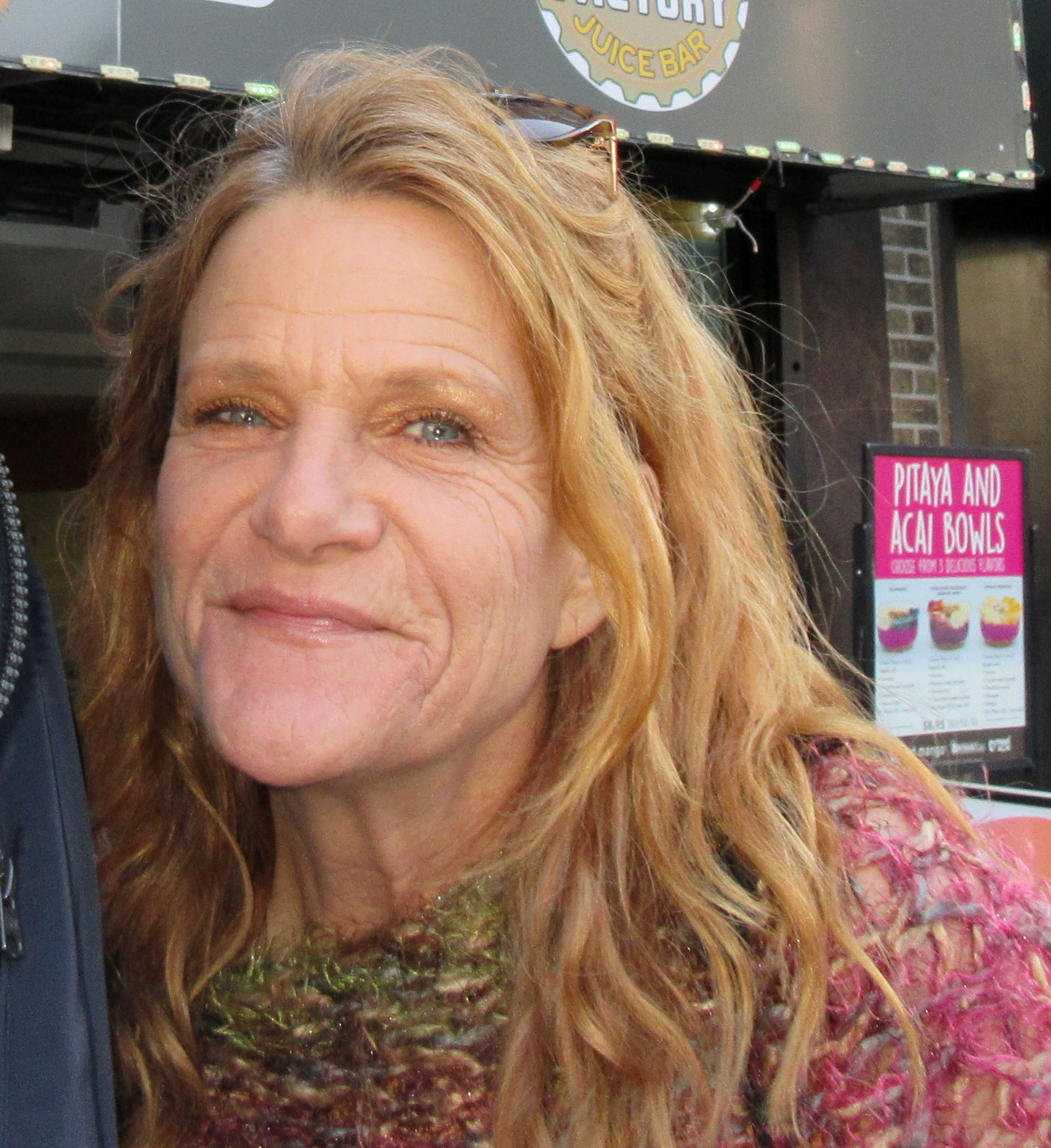
- Dickey in 2018
- Born: Diana Dale Dickey; 1961 or 1962 (age 64–65); Knoxville, Tennessee, U.S.
- Education: University of Tennessee
- Occupation: Actress
- Years active: 1972–present

Diana Dale Dickey is an American character actor who has worked in theater, film, and television. She began her career on stage, performing in the 1989 Broadway version of The Merchant of Venice, before appearing in popular revivals of A Streetcar Named Desire, Steel Magnolias, Sweeney Todd and more off-Broadway and in regional theaters. She's the recipient of two Ovation Awards for her stage work in Los Angeles.

Known as a "consummate character actor," Dickey made her screen debut in 1995. She won the Independent Spirit Award for Best Supporting Female for her breakthrough performance as Merab in the 2010 independent drama film Winter's Bone. Over her career, she has appeared in more than 60 movies, most notably Changeling (2008), Super 8 (2011), Iron Man 3 (2013), Regression (2015), Hell or High Water (2016), Leave No Trace (2018), Bloodline (2018) and No Exit (2022). Her television credits include recurring roles on My Name Is Earl (2005–09), Breaking Bad (2009), True Blood (2012–13), Justified (2014), and Claws (2017–22). She also was a regular cast member on the second season of the HBO comedy series Vice Principals (2017), co-starred in the Netflix miniseries Unbelievable (2019), and featured in Amazon's 2022 comedy-series reboot of A League of Their Own.

Dickey received widespread acclaim from critics for her lead performance in the 2022 romantic drama film A Love Song, for which she received the Chlotrudis Award for Best Actress and was nominated for the Independent Spirit Award for Best Lead Performance and the Gotham Independent Film Award for Outstanding Lead Performance. In 2023 she played the leading role in the thriller film The G. For her performance as Rosemary in the Apple TV+ series, Widow's Bay, Dickey was nominated for a 2026 Primetime Emmy Award for Outstanding Supporting Actress in a Comedy Series.

== Early life ==
Diana Dale Dickey was born in Knoxville, Tennessee, and attended Bearden High School. She played several roles in high school productions, notably as Emily in Our Town. According to the Knoxville News Sentinel, Dickey likely made her acting debut in a Clarence Brown Theater production of "Oliver!" in 1972. She later attended the University of Tennessee from 1979 to 1984, but left to pursue her acting career. On December 10, 2015, she returned to the University of Tennessee as a guest speaker, where she gave the commencement speech to Fall graduates, and was awarded an honorary Master of Fine Arts degree from the university.

== Career ==
Dickey has been working as a character actress in both mainstream and independent films since the 1990s. Prior it she spent 11 years in New York performing on theater productions. She made her television debut playing the recurring role of Opal McHone in CBS historical drama series, Christy from 1994 to 1995. The following year, she made her big screen debut in the comedy-drama film The Incredibly True Adventure of Two Girls in Love and the following year appeared in the drama Running Wild. She later had supporting parts in the made-for-television movies Cagney & Lacey: Together Again (1995), Prison of Secrets (1997) and Christy: Return to Cutter Gap (2000). In 1995 she moved to Los Angeles and went to audition for the ABC police procedural High Incident when director, Charles Haid said: “Could you come back tomorrow as a heroin addict?”. The following years she was typecast for playing roles such as prisoners, prostitutes, drug addicts and homeless. She played Glyndora Roberts in the 2000 independent comedy film, Sordid Lives, and later returned to the role in the Logo sitcom Sordid Lives: The Series (2008). She returned to the franchise in 2017, playing a different role in A Very Sordid Wedding (replacing Beth Grant as Sissy Hickey). Her other 2000s film credits include The Pledge (2001), Our Very Own (2005), and Changeling (2008).

During the 2000s, Dickey guest-starred in a number of television series, including The X-Files, Frasier, CSI: Crime Scene Investigation, Gilmore Girls, The Closer and Ugly Betty. From 2005 to 2009, she had a recurring role as Patty the Daytime Hooker in the NBC comedy series, My Name Is Earl. In 2009, she had a recurring role as Spooge's "Skank" Lady, a meth addict in the AMC drama series, Breaking Bad. Dickey also performed in various stage productions, including the Broadway production of The Merchant of Venice (1989), the 1989 Chicago production of Steel Magnolias playing Annelle Dupuy-DeSoto opposite Constance Towers and receiving a note from the Chicago Tribune, and the 2009 stage adaptation of A Streetcar Named Desire as Blanche DuBois, and many other off-Broadway and regional theatres receiving two Ovation Awards.

Dickey received critical praise for her performance as Merab in 2010 independent drama film Winter's Bone opposite Jennifer Lawrence, winning the Independent Spirit Award for Best Supporting Female in February 2011. From 2012 to 2013, she played the role of Martha Bozeman in the fifth and sixth seasons of the HBO series True Blood. After Winter's Bone, Dickey appeared in the science fiction film Super 8 (2011) directed by J. J. Abrams, the road comedy The Guilt Trip starring Barbra Streisand, and the superhero film Iron Man 3, directed by Shane Black in 2013. In 2013 she starred in the miniseries Bonnie and Clyde: Dead and Alive on Lifetime and appeared in the drama film, The Trials of Cate McCall starring Kate Beckinsale. In 2014, she had a recurring role in the FX series Justified. She also made guest appearances on 2 Broke Girls, Grey's Anatomy, Sons of Anarchy, Better Things, Shameless and Why Women Kill. In 2015, Dickey portrayed Rose Gray in the Spanish-American thriller film Regression, in which she co-stars with Ethan Hawke and Emma Watson.

Dickey mostly appeared in the independent features during the 2010s playing character roles, notable the Gothic thriller The Yellow Wallpaper (2011), the dramas Being Flynn (2012) starring Robert De Niro, Blues for Willadean (2013) alongside Beth Grant and Octavia Spencer, Southern Baptist Sissies (2013), White Bird in a Blizzard (2014), the action thriller What Lola Wants (2015), the comedy-drama Waffle Street (2015), the action thriller Blood Father (2016), and the prison drama Dead Women Walking (2018) receiving a positive review from Variety. On television, she had a recurring role of Juanda Husser in the TNT crime comedy-drama series, Claws from 2017 to 2022. In 2017, she starred in the second season of HBO dark comedy Vice Principals and in 2019 appeared in the Netflix miniseries Unbelievable. In 2022, she had a recurring role in the Amazon series A League of Their Own. She also appeared in the films Hell or High Water (2016), Leave No Trace (2018), Bloodline (2018), Palm Springs (2020), and Flag Day (2021).

In 2022, Dickey played the leading role in the drama film A Love Song. The performance received positive reviews from critics, notably from the Los Angeles Times and Rolling Stone. The film marks the first leading role in her career. In her interview for IndieWire, Dickey said: "I fell between the cracks. I was not pretty enough in this category to be the leading lady and I wasn't quirky or odd enough in this category to be the only character actress". "Even in college, I tended to play everybody under 12 or over fifty. I think you finally grow into your age range and, sure enough, when I started getting into my mid-forties is when I started working more. I slowly built a career, but it was difficult." She received Independent Spirit Award for Best Lead Performance and Gotham Independent Film Award for Outstanding Lead Performance nominations for her role. Also that year, she starred in the thriller film, No Exit, and played another leading role in the Irish drama film The Cry of Granuaile playing a grieving American filmmaker who travels to the west of Ireland with an Irish assistant, in order to research the 16th-century swashbuckler of the title. In 2023, Dickey was cast in the Paramount+ western series Lawmen: Bass Reeves and Amazon series Fallout. Also that year, Dickey played the leading role in the crime thriller film The G written and directed by Karl R. Hearne. Released on November 29, 2024, The G received positive reviews from critics, on the review aggregator website Rotten Tomatoes, 100% of 41 critics' reviews are positive. Her performance was praised by Variety, The Guardian, Screen Daily and Alliance of Women Film Journalists.

In 2024, Dickey played a strong matriarch in the Western film, Horizon: An American Saga – Chapter 1, and in 2026 appeared in the road comedy-drama film, Hot Water playing key supporting role. On television, she had recurring roles on Bookie, Bosch: Legacy and The Lowdown. In 2026, Dickey guest-starred in an episode of Dutton Ranch, and later began starring in the horror comedy series, Widow's Bay. For her performance as Rosemary, an office worker whose monologue scenes went viral, Dickey received positive reviews and a Primetime Emmy Award nomination for Outstanding Supporting Actress in a Comedy Series.

== Filmography ==
Key
†	Denotes works that have not yet been released

=== Film ===
Year	Title	Role	Notes
1995	The Incredibly True Adventure of Two Girls in Love	Regina	
1995	Running Wild	Judith	
1995	The Journey of August King	Jenny	
1997	Prison of Secrets	Harriet	
2000	Sordid Lives	Glyndora	
2001	The Pledge	Strom	
2005	Our Very Own	Skillet	
2005	Domino	Edna Fender	
2006	Nothing but Ghosts	Annie	
2008	Trailer Park of Terror	Daryl	
2008	Dark Canvas	Wilma	
2008	Changeling	Patient	
2008	Leaving Barstow	Linda	
2009	A Perfect Getaway	Earth Momma	
2010	Winter's Bone	Merab	Independent Spirit Award for Best Supporting Female; Gotham Independent Film Award for Best Ensemble Performance; Village Voice Film Poll for Best Supporting Actress (2nd place); Southeastern Film Critics Association Award for Best Ensemble (2nd place); Nominated — San Diego Film Critics Society Award for Best Supporting Actress; Nominated — San Diego Film Critics Society Award for Best Ensemble Performance
2011	Child of the Desert	Elia	
2011	Super 8	Edie	
2011	Pirates of the Caribbean: Tales of the Code: Wedlocked	Oona	
2012	Evidence	Katrina Fleishman	
2012	Blues for Willadean	Rayleen Hobbs	
2012	Tales of Everyday Magic	Maggie	
2012	The Happiest Person in America	Meg	
2012	My Greatest Teacher	Maggie	
2012	Being Flynn	Marie	
2012	The Yellow Wallpaper	Jennie Gilman	
2012	The Man Who Shook the Hand of Vicente Fernandez	Denise	
2012	The Guilt Trip	Tammy	
2012	Lost on Purpose	Retta Lee	
2012	9 Full Moons	Billie	
2013	C.O.G.	Debbie	
2013	Dark Around the Stars	Rita	
2013	The Trials of Cate McCall	Mrs. Stubbs	
2013	Teddy Bears	Lori	
2013	Iron Man 3	Mrs. Davis	
2013	Southern Baptist Sissies	Odette	
2013	Evidence	Katrina Fleishman	
2014	What Lola Wants	Mama	
2014	White Bird in a Blizzard	Mrs. Hillman	
2014	The Possession of Michael King	Beverly	
2014	San Patricios	Colleen Donnelly	
2015	Ain't It Nowhere	Aunt Sissie	
2015	Regression	Rose Gray	
2015	Waffle Street	Crazy Kathy	
2015	Blood Father	Cherise	
2016	Poor Boy	Deb Chilson	
2016	Hell or High Water	Elsie	
2016	Message from the King	Mrs. Lazlo	
2017	Small Town Crime	Leslie	
2017	A Very Sordid Wedding	Sissy Hickey	FilmOut San Diego Audience Award for Best Supporting Actress
2017	Inheritance	Effy Monroe	
2017	Last Requests	Maggie	Short Film
2017	You're Gonna Miss Me	Zelda Montana	
2018	Bella	Nurse Charlotte Warren	Nominated — Northern Virginia International Film and Music Festival Award for Best Ensemble Acting
2018	Leave No Trace	Dale	Nominated — Indiana Film Journalists Association Award for Best Ensemble Acting
2018	Dead Women Walking	Rebecca	
2018	Lawless Range	Coleen Donnelly	
2018	Bloodline	Marie Cole	
2019	Wish Man	Clover	
2020	Palm Springs	Darla	
2021	Flag Day	Grandma Margaret	
2022	The Phantoms	Jenny Gilman	
2022	Continue	Nurse Love	
2022	The Cry of Granuaile	Maire	
2022	A Love Song	Faye	Chlotrudis Society for Independent Films Award for Best Actress; Seattle International Film Festival Award for Best Performance; Provincetown International Film Festival for Excellence in Acting Award; Nominated — Independent Spirit Award for Best Lead Performance; Nominated - Gotham Independent Film Award for Outstanding Lead Performance
2022	No Exit	Sandi	
2022	Savage Salvation	Greta	
2023	The G	Ann Hunter/The G	Bari International Film Festival Award for Best Actress
2024	Horizon: An American Saga – Chapter 1	Mrs. Sykes	
2026	Hot Water		
TBA	Rated	Lani	

=== Television ===
Year	Title	Role	Notes
1994–1995	Christy	Opal McHone	4 episodes
1995	Cagney & Lacey: Together Again	Gloria	TV movie
1995	The Client	Estelle	Episode: "Drive, He Said"
1996	High Incident	Jane Doe	2 episodes
2000	City of Angels	Rose Odalee Greenup	Episode: "The High Cost of Living"
2000	Christy: The Movie	Opal McHone	TV movie
2001	Christy, Choices of the Heart, Part II: A New Beginning	Opal McHone	TV miniseries; 2 episodes
2001	The X-Files	Game Warden	Episode: "Existence"
2003	Frasier	Mrs. Grant	Episode: "Some Assembly Required"
2004	CSI: Crime Scene Investigation	Cassie	Episode: "Bad to the Bone"
2004	ER	Mrs. Price	Episode: "Twas the Night"
2005	Numb3rs	Karen	Episode: "Counterfeit Reality"
2005–2009	My Name Is Earl	Patty, the daytime hooker	19 episodes
2006	Gilmore Girls	Ruthie	2 episodes
2006	Cold Case	Reba Dautry	Episode: "Joseph"
2006	The Closer	Anna Larson	Episode: "Out of Focus"
2007	Shark	Nancy Padget	Episode: "Porn Free"
2007	Ugly Betty	Sugar Free Shirley	Episode: "East Side Story"
2008	Sordid Lives: The Series	Glyndora Roberts	Series regular, 6 episodes
2009	Princess Protection Program	Helen	TV movie
2009	Breaking Bad	Spooge's "Skank" Lady	Episodes: "Breakage" and "Peekaboo"
2010	All Signs of Death	Thea	TV Pilot
2010	Bones	Marsha Vinton	Episode: "The X in the File"
2010	Criminal Minds	Carol	Episode: "Exit Wounds"
2010	Weeds	Sugarpop	Episode: "Gentle Puppies"
2011	2 Broke Girls	Elena	Episode: "And the Pop-Up Sale"
2012–2013	Raising Hope	Patty	2 episodes
2012–2013	True Blood	Martha Bozeman	12 episodes
2013	Grey's Anatomy	Gasoline	Episode: "Things We Said Today"
2013	Southland	Maureen	Episode: "Heroes"
2013	Last Man Standing	Doris	Episode: "Shoveling Snow"
2013	Bonnie and Clyde: Dead and Alive	Cummie Barrow	TV miniseries; 2 episodes
2014	Justified	Judith	4 episodes
2014	The Middle	Sandy	Episode: "Orlando"
2014	Dinner with Friends with Brett Gelman and Friends	Herself	TV special
2014	Sons of Anarchy	Renee O'Leary Egan	Episode: "The Separation of Crows"
2015	Backstrom	Judge Nunn	Episode: "Rock Bottom"
2015	Documentary Now!	Joelle Fellweather	Episode: "The Eye Doesn't Lie"
2016	Better Things	Jace	Episode: "Sam/Pilot"
2017	Red Blooded	Bo	TV pilot
2017	Vice Principals	Nash	Series regular, 9 episodes
2017	Shameless	Aunt Ronnie	Episode: "Fuck Paying It Forward"
2017–2022	Claws	Juanda Husser	11 episodes
2018	Into the Dark	Red	Episode: "Pooka!"
2019	Unbelievable	RoseMarie	Miniseries, 6 episodes
2019	Why Women Kill	Ruby Jenkins	Episode: "Practically Lethal in Every Way"
2019	Room 104	Sharon	Episode: "Animal for Sale"
2021	Them	The Woman	3 episodes
2022	A League of Their Own	Beverly	8 episodes
2022	Let the Right One In	Debra Harper	2 episodes
2023	The Mandalorian	Saifir (voice)	Episode: "Chapter 22 Guns For Hire"
2023	Station 19	June Hardy	Episode: "What Are You Willing to Lose"
2023	Lawmen: Bass Reeves	Widow Dolliver	2 episodes
2024, 2026	Fallout	Ma June	2 episodes
2024–2025	Bookie	Wendy	Recurring role
2025	Bosch: Legacy	Sheila Walsh	3 episodes
2025	The Lowdown	Bonnie	3 episodes
2026	Widow's Bay	Rosemary	Main role
2026	Dutton Ranch	Anna Dupree	Episode: "Act of God Business"
2026	The Hunting Wives	Zelda Moffitt	Season 2

=== Stage ===
Year	Title	Role	Notes
1972	Oliver!	Bet	Clarence Brown Theater
1989	The Merchant of Venice	Ensemble	46th Street Theatre, Broadway
1989	Steel Magnolias	Annelle	Royal-George Theatre, Chicago
2003	The Trials and Tribulations of a Trailer Trash Housewife	Rayleen Hobbs	Zephyr Theater
2004	The Conquest of the South Pole	Braukmann's Wife	Odyssey Theatre Ensemble
2009	A Streetcar Named Desire	Blanche DuBois	Clarence Brown Theater
2012	Sweeney Todd: The Demon Barber of Fleet Street	Mrs. Lovett	Clarence Brown Theater
2016	Barbecue	Adlean	Geffen Playhouse
2020	This Side of Crazy	Abigail	Zephyr Theater

== Awards and nominations ==
Year	Award	Category	Work	Result	Ref.
2010	Independent Spirit Award	Best Supporting Female	Winter's Bone	Won	
2010	Gotham Independent Film Award	Best Ensemble Performance	Winter's Bone	Won	
2010	Village Voice Film Poll	Best Supporting Actress	Winter's Bone	Runner-up	
2010	Southeastern Film Critics Association	Best Ensemble	Winter's Bone	Runner-up	
2010	San Diego Film Critics Society	Best Supporting Actress	Winter's Bone	Nominated	
2010	San Diego Film Critics Society	Best Ensemble Performance	Winter's Bone	Nominated	
2017	FilmOut San Diego Audience Award	Best Supporting Actress	A Very Sordid Wedding	Won	
2016	Northern Virginia International Film and Music Festival Award	Best Ensemble Acting	Bella	Nominated	
2018	Indiana Film Journalists Association Award	Best Ensemble Acting	Leave No Trace	Nominated	
2022	Provincetown International Film Festival Award	Excellence in Acting Award	A Love Song	Won	
2022	Seattle International Film Festival Award	Best Performance	A Love Song	Won	
2023	Chlotrudis Award	Best Actress	A Love Song	Won	
2023	Independent Spirit Award	Best Lead Performance	A Love Song	Nominated	
2023	Gotham Independent Film Award	Outstanding Lead Performance	A Love Song	Nominated	
2024	Bari International Film Festival Award	Best Actress	The G	Won	
2026	Primetime Emmy Award	Outstanding Supporting Actress in a Comedy Series	Widow's Bay	Nominated	
