= Mr. & Mrs. Smith (1996 TV series) =

Television series

- Genre: Action drama
- Created by: Kerry Lenhart; John J. Sakmar
- Showrunners: Kerry Lenhart; John J. Sakmar
- Written by: Mitchell Burgess; Michael Cassutt; Susan Cridland Wick; Michael Gleason; Sanford Golden; Robin Green; Kerry Lenhart; John J. Sakmar; Del Shores; Douglas Steinberg
- Directed by: Lou Antonio; Daniel Attias; Ralph Hemecker; David Jackson; Artie Mandelberg; Nick Marck; Sharron Miller; James Quinn; Jonathan Sanger; Oz Scott; Rob Thompson; James Whitmore, Jr.; Michael Zinberg
- Starring: Scott Bakula; Maria Bello; Roy Dotrice
- Composer: Velton Ray Bunch (all episodes)
- Country of origin: United States
- Original language: English
- No. of seasons: 1
- No. of episodes: 13 (4 unaired)

Production
- Executive producers: Kerry Lenhart; John J. Sakmar
- Producers: Scott Bakula; Artie Mandelberg
- Cinematography: Ronn Schmidt
- Editor: Lee Haxall
- Running time: 46 minutes 60 minutes (original airing)
- Production companies: Page Two Productions; Bakula Productions; Warner Bros. Television

Original release
- Network: CBS
- Release: September 20 – November 8, 1996

Mr. & Mrs. Smith is an American action drama television series that aired on CBS. Starring Scott Bakula and Maria Bello, the series aired from September 20, 1996, to November 8, 1996. Mr. & Mrs. Smith was set and filmed in Seattle. The series was produced by Page Two Productions and Bakula Productions in association with Warner Bros. Television.

== Synopsis ==
A spy known only as Mr. Smith (Bakula) works for a private security organization known as "The Factory". Using covert operatives and the latest technology they gather information on technology, science, and economics in an effort to protect corporate America from espionage. They are also hired out as private security or to help with covert operations like the recovery of stolen Stinger missiles. In the pilot, a rival named Mrs. Smith (Bello) becomes entangled in a case with Mr. Smith. After losing her job when her mission fails, The Factory hires her and assigns them to work together. Though they often bicker, and know nothing about each other's personal lives, including real names, they make a good team.

The series was canceled after nine of the thirteen episodes produced were aired. The remaining four episodes aired in Norway, Poland, Finland, Australia, the Netherlands, and Germany.

== Cast ==
- Scott Bakula as Mr. Smith
- Maria Bello as Mrs. Smith
- Roy Dotrice as Mr. Big

== Production ==
Mr. & Mrs. Smith was executive produced by Kerry Lenhart and John J. Sakmar. Series star Scott Bakula served as one of the series' producers.

The pilot episode marked the acting debut of Timothy Olyphant, who played Mr. Smith's original partner.

== Episodes ==
No.	Title	Directed by	Written by	Original release date	Prod. code
1	"Pilot"	David S. Jackson	Kerry Lenhart & John J. Sakmar	September 20, 1996	296641
While searching for two missing physicists who've made a breakthrough in cold fusion, a secret agent encounters an equally secret and capable blonde girl who is in competition with him.
2	"The Suburban Episode"	Oz Scott	Robin Green & Mitchell Burgess	September 27, 1996	465851
Now forced to work together and masquerading as a suburban couple, "Mr. and Mrs. Smith" spy on their neighbor who is suspected of stealing top-secret information from his employer.
3	"The Second Episode"	Ralph Hemecker	Kerry Lenhart & John J. Sakmar	October 4, 1996	465853
With the assistance of a nerdy bookkeeper, Mr. and Mrs. Smith go to sea to spy on a shipper who is suspected of stealing 200 Stinger missiles.
4	"The Poor Pitiful Put-Upon Singer Episode"	Nick Marck	Del Shores	October 11, 1996	465854
With the assistance of an annoying computer expert, Mr. and Mrs. Smith try to find out who is behind an assassination attempt on a record producer.
5	"The Grape Escape"	Dan Attias	Susan Cridland Wick	October 18, 1996	465855
Mr. and Mrs. Smith go to Napa Valley to find out who is trying to use genetically engineered insects to destroy the grape crop, and Mr. Smith learns more about his mysterious partner's past. Note: This episode begins with a flashback to "The Publishing Episode".
6	"The Publishing Episode"	James Quinn	Douglas Steinberg	October 25, 1996	465852
Mr. and Mrs. Smith pose as author and literary agent, respectively, to track down a former agent's book which could compromise the identity of American spies all over the world.
7	"The Coma Episode"	Michael Zinberg	Douglas Steinberg	October 28, 1996	465857
Mr. and Mrs. Smith enter a hospital, posing as a doctor and his comatose patient, to protect an unconscious woman who can identify a saboteur when she wakes up.
8	"The Kidnapping Episode"	Lou Antonio	Robin Green & Mitchell Burgess	November 1, 1996	465856
Mr. and Mrs. Smith go after a kidnapper, who always seems to be one step ahead of them.
9	"The Space Flight Episode"	Sharron Miller	Michael Cassutt	November 8, 1996	465858
Mr. and Mrs. Smith go after the scientist son of a former astronaut, who has sold his novel flying platform to crooked military contractor who wants to turn it into a weapon.
10	"The Big Easy Episode"	James Whitmore, Jr.	Del Shores	Unaired	465859
The Smiths pose as "spin doctors" for a New Orleans senator who's involved in a scandal where his girlfriend is accused of selling defense secrets to Iraq. Together with Rox they are trying to expose the real culprit.
11	"The Impossible Mission"	Artie Mandelberg	Story by : Douglas Steinberg; Teleplay by : Kerry Lenhart & John J. Sakmar	Unaired	465860
Mr. & Mrs. Jones are sent in to retrieve stolen currency plates from the U.S. Department of the Treasury. When Mrs. Jones gets shot Mr. & Mrs. Smith get called in to finish the job.
12	"The Bob Episode"	Jonathan Sanger	Sanford Golden	Unaired	465861
The Smiths and a CIA-agent lose a ball of plutonium-239 due to the interference of Bob Myers, an old friend of Jerry Rawlins (Mr. Smith). Now they must retrieve the plutonium and protect Bob from the terrorist.
13	"The Sins of the Father Episode"	Rob Thompson	Michael Gleason	Unaired	465862
Mr. Smith disappears during a mission and leaves Mrs. Smith hanging. She escapes and begins to search for the missing Mr. Smith. Meanwhile, he finds out that his son has been kidnapped and to get him back he must kill a man.
