= Del Shores =

American playwright and filmmaker (born 1957)

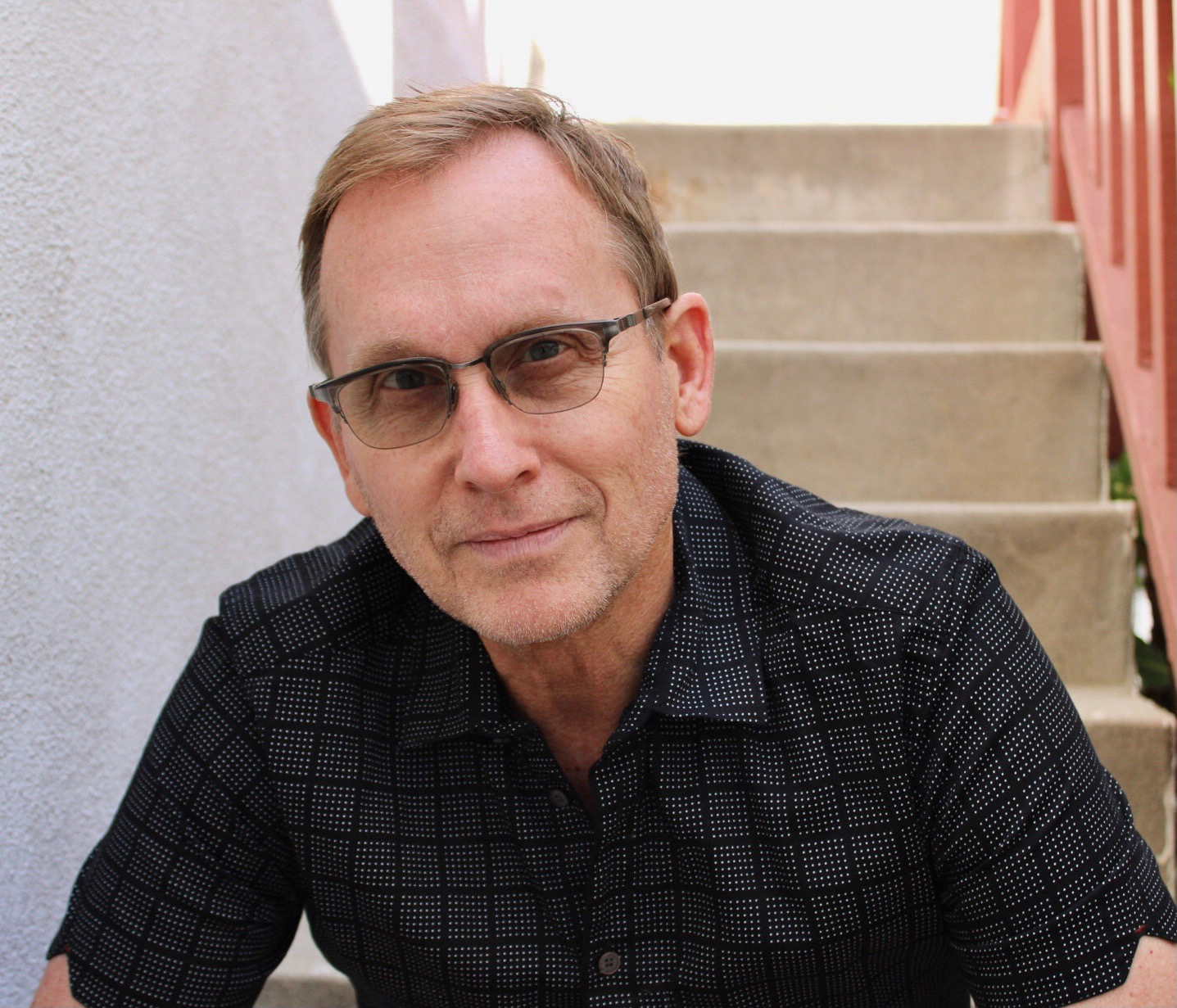
- Shores in 2023
- Born: Delferd Lynn Shores; December 3, 1957 (age 68); Winters, Texas, U.S.
- Education: Baylor University
- Occupations: Playwright; film director; producer; screenwriter; actor
- Years active: 1984–present
- Spouses: Kelley Alexander (m. 1986; div. 1996); Jason Dottley (m. 2003; div. 2011)
- Children: 2
- Website: www.delshores.com

Del Shores (born Delferd Lynn Shores; December 3, 1957) is an American director, producer, screenwriter, playwright and actor known for his work in theater, television, and film. He debuted with his first play, Cheatin' (1984) which became successful, and later rose to prominence for his play Sordid Lives (1996) and the 2000 film adaptation. His works often explore themes of LGBTQ+ identity, Southern culture, and dysfunctional family dynamics, blending humor with drama.

Shores has also written and directed other plays, including Southern Baptist Sissies (2000), The Trials and Tribulations of a Trailer Trash Housewife (2003), and Yellow (2010), many of which he adapted into films. In television, he has worked as a writer and producer on shows like Queer As Folk and Dharma & Greg.

== Early life and influence ==
Delferd Lynn Shores was born in Winters, Texas on December 3, 1957, to Vernie Loraine Shores (née Fuller; 1936–2001), a school teacher, and William David Shores (1933–2003), a Southern Baptist minister. (Note: Attributed to multiple sources:) When he was about to start first grade, his family relocated to Brownwood, Texas. Shores credits his mother for sparking his passion for theater, as she encouraged him and his brother to participate in stage productions at Howard Payne University and rewarded them with a dollar for every book or play they read. He later attended Baylor University, earning a degree in journalism and Spanish.

In 1980, Shores moved to Los Angeles to pursue an acting career. While there, he became a Sunday school teacher at a Baptist church in Beverly Hills and discovered a passion for writing. In 1982, Shores first met actors Newell Alexander, his wife Rosemary and daughter Kelley at a musical. Two years later Shores produced his first play titled, Cheatin' in North Hollywood and cast Newell, while also hiring Kelly as a stage manager. Shores credits his inspiration comes from the works of Tennessee Williams and Preston Jones. Shores also cast Leslie Jordan in subsequent productions, which would establish a professional and personal friendship with Jordan. He and Kelly were married in 1986. They divorced in 1996 after Shores came out as gay, but remained close.

== Career ==
=== Theater ===
Shores' second play Daddy's Dyin': Who's Got the Will?, debuted in Los Angeles at Theatre/Theater on February 7, 1987. The production received positive reviews and ran for two years. On May 20, 1993, the final play in his Lowake trilogy set, Daughters of the Lone Star State premiered at the Zephyr Theatre under the direction of Ron Link. Variety described the production as a "an unflinching, if somewhat unfocused, look at the racial and social tensions so prevalent in modern-day America".

Shores wrote and directed a fourth play, Sordid Lives, a comedy inspired by his own family that revolves around the eccentric Ingram family in Texas while incorporating LGBTQ themes. The play premiered in Los Angeles on May 11, 1996, and ran for 13 months. At the time, Shores was going through a divorce and described Sordid Lives as his "coming out play". The production received positive reviews, earning 14 Drama-Logue Awards and 13 Critic's Choice honors.

Shores' play Southern Baptist Sissies premiered at the Zephyr Theatre in Los Angeles in September 2000, running for ten months and returning in 2001. The production earned a GLAAD Media Award for Outstanding Los Angeles Theater It was revived in April 2002 for another six-month run and later played at the Bailiwick Repertory Theatre in Chicago in July 2002 to positive reviews He then wrote and directed The Trials and Tribulations of a Trailer Trash Housewife, a more dramatic play than his previous comedies, which debuted in 2003 at the Zephyr Theatre in Los Angeles. The play won NAACP Theatre Awards for Best Playwright/Playwright Adaptation/Best Production In 2012, Shores adapted it into the film Blues for Willadean, starring Octavia Spencer and Beth Grant.

In 2006, Shores revived three of his plays—Sordid Lives, Southern Baptist Sissies, The Trials and Tribulations of a Trailer Trash Housewife—at the Zephyr Theatre. That same year, he received a Golden Palm Star on the Palm Springs Walk of Stars. Shores returned to theater in April 2010 with Yellow, performed at The Coast Playhouse in West Hollywood. In 2018, he wrote and performed Six Characters in Search of a Play, followed by the premiere of his ninth play, This Side of Crazy, at the New Conservatory Theatre Center in San Francisco in 2019. The stage version of A Very Sordid Wedding played in 2021. The Recipe Box premiered at the Terrific New Theatre in Birmingham, Alabama from February 5 to 20, 2026. The play was written and directed by Shores and stars his longtime creative partner Emerson Collins.

=== Television ===
In 1995, Shores produced the first season of the sitcom Ned and Stacey and wrote three episodes. The following year he served as co-producer and writer of two episodes for Mr. & Mrs. Smith. He directed a 2001 TV film The Wilde Girls for Showtime, starring Olivia Newton-John, Chloe Lattanzi, and Swoosie Kurtz.

From 2003 to 2005 he was a writer and producer on the Showtime series Queer As Folk. In 2008, he created, wrote, and directed 12 episodes of Sordid Lives: The Series, a prequel to Sordid Lives, which aired for one season on Logo.

=== Film ===
While Daddy's Dyin': Who's Got the Will? was still playing, Shores wrote a screenplay for a film version, starring. His manager invited director Jack Fisk and his wife, actress Sissy Spacek, to see the play. Fisk, who had an existing deal with Propaganda Films, took an interest in directing the adaptation, and the company agreed to produce the film using Shores' screenplay. The film adaptation was released in 1990 by MGM. Around this time, Shores also signed a deal with Warner Brothers. After writing the script Sordid Lives in 1999, he created his own independent company to fund and produce. The film premiered at the Palm Beach International Film Festival on February 4, 2000, and was given an eight-theater limited run from May 11, 2001, to April 20, 2003, grossing a total of $1.1 million. In 2013, Shores wrote, produced and directed a film adaptation of Southern Baptist Sissies. Shores wrote, produced, and directed A Very Sordid Wedding, a sequel film in the Sordid Lives series, which was released in 2017.

=== Other ventures ===
Shores has performed stand-up gigs in Los Angeles and Florida. In 2019, Shores founded a Del Shores Foundation, a nonprofit organization dedicated to discovering and supporting LGBTQ creative voices from the American South. He appeared in an episode of House Hunters on January 31, 2026.

== Personal life ==
Shores has two daughters with Kelley Alexander (m. 1986–1996). Shores was married to Jason Dottley from 2003 to 2011. Shores describes himself as agnostic, but also spiritual. He explained in a 2015 interview with Out Front that: "I believe in humanity. I don't pretend to know any more about God. So I don't know, I suspect there is not. I don't think there is a god. I don't believe in all that, so I am not a Christian. I am not religious on any level".

== Credits ==
=== Plays ===
- Cheatin' (1984; also performed)
- Daddy's Dyin': Who's Got the Will? (1987)
- Daughters of the Lone Star State (1993)
- Sordid Lives (1996; also director)
- Southern Baptist Sissies (2000; also director)
- The Trials and Tribulations of a Trailer Trash Housewife (2003; also director)
- Yellow (2010; also director)
- Six Characters In Search of a Play (2018; also performed)
- This Side of Crazy (2019; also director)
- A Very Sordid Wedding (2021; also director)
- In Memoriam of Lena (2021; also director)
- The Red Suitcase (2023; director only)
- Wounded (2024; director only)
- The Recipe Box (2026; also director)

=== Books ===
- The Sordid Lives Saga: Before The Trip (2022, self-published)

=== Film ===
Feature and short film credits
Year	Title	Producer	Writer	Director	Notes	Ref(s)
1988	Two Moon Junction	No	No	No	Part of the walla group	
1990	Daddy's Dyin'... (Who's Got The Will?)	Yes	Yes	No	Executive producer	
2000	Sordid Lives	No	Yes	Yes	Directorial debut	
2011	Del Shores: My Sordid Life	Yes	Yes	Yes		
2012	Del Shores: Sordid Confessions	Yes	Yes	Yes		
2012	Blues for Willadean	Yes	Yes	Yes		
2012	Cry	No	No	No	Jeremy	
2013	Southern Baptist Sissies	Yes	Yes	Yes		
2017	Del Shores: Naked, Sordid, Reality	Yes	Yes	Yes		
2017	A Very Sordid Wedding	Yes	Yes	Yes		
2019	Six Characters in Search of a Play	Yes	Yes	No		
2019	Cognitive	No	No	No	Brother Elymas	
2023	Shafted	No	No	Yes	Short	

=== Television ===
Television credits
Year	Title	Executive producer	Writer	Producer	Notes	Ref(s)
1987	The Quick and the Dead	No	No	No	TV film; played Purdy Mantle	
1994	Touched by an Angel	No	Yes	No	1 episode	
1995	Live Shot	No	Yes	No	1 episode	
1995– 1996	Ned and Stacey	No	Yes	Yes	Wrote 3 episodes	
1996	Mr. & Mrs. Smith	No	Yes	No	2 episodes; also co-producer	
1999	Martial Law	No	Yes	No	2 episodes	
2001	The Wilde Girls	Yes	Yes	No	TV film; also director	
2001– 2002	Dharma & Greg	No	Yes	No	5 episodes; also consulting producer	
2003– 2005	Queer as Folk	Yes	Yes	Yes	16 episodes; also co-executive producer	
2008	Sordid Lives: The Series	Yes	Yes	Yes	Also showrunner and director	
