= Southern Baptist Sissies =

- Film poster
- Directed by: Del Shores
- Written by: Del Shores
- Based on: Southern Baptist Sissies by Del Shores
- Produced by: Emerson Collins; Del Shores
- Starring: Leslie Jordan; Dale Dickey
- Cinematography: Nickolas Dylan Rossi
- Edited by: Donna Mathewson
- Music by: Joe Patrick Ward
- Production company: Beard Collins Shores Productions
- Release date: November 18, 2013 (St. Louis)
- Running time: 138 minutes
- Country: United States
- Language: English

Southern Baptist Sissies is a 2013 American drama film written and directed by Del Shores. It is based on Shores's 2000 play of the same name.

== Plot ==
Based in a small town in Texas, four boys named Mark, Benny, TJ, and Andrew retell their experiences of discovering their homosexuality while being raised in a conservative Baptist church. The film is a satirical comedy and a serious exploration of what it means to be gay.

== Cast ==
- Emerson Collins as Mark
- Willam Belli as Benny
- Matthew Scott Montgomery as Andrew
- Luke Stratte-McClure as TJ
- Bobbie Eakes as Mark's Mother
- Rosemary Alexander as Andrew's Mother
- Joe Patrick Ward as Houston / Bro. Chaffey
- Newell Alexander as Preacher
- Leslie Jordan as Preston 'Peanut' LeRoy
- Dale Dickey as Odette Annette Barnett
- Ann Walker as Benny's Grandmother

== Reception ==
The film has a 60% approval rating on Rotten Tomatoes based on five reviews, with an average score of 6.13/10.
