= Palm Beach International Film Festival =

- Location: Palm Beach, Florida, United States
- Founded: 1996 Closed in 2017
- No. of films: 160
- Website: http://www.pbifilmfest.org/

The Palm Beach International Film Festival was a film festival in the United States held in Palm Beach, Florida which showcased over 120 films annually in April for over 20,000 attendees. It was ranked by the international movie publication MovieMaker Magazine as one of the top 10 destination film festivals in the world as well as one of the Top 25 Independent Festivals in the world. The festival has also hosted more than 150 World Premieres and thousands films from over 60 countries.

The Palm Beach International Film Festival (PBIFF) is a not for profit 501 (c) 3 defunct organization.

== History ==
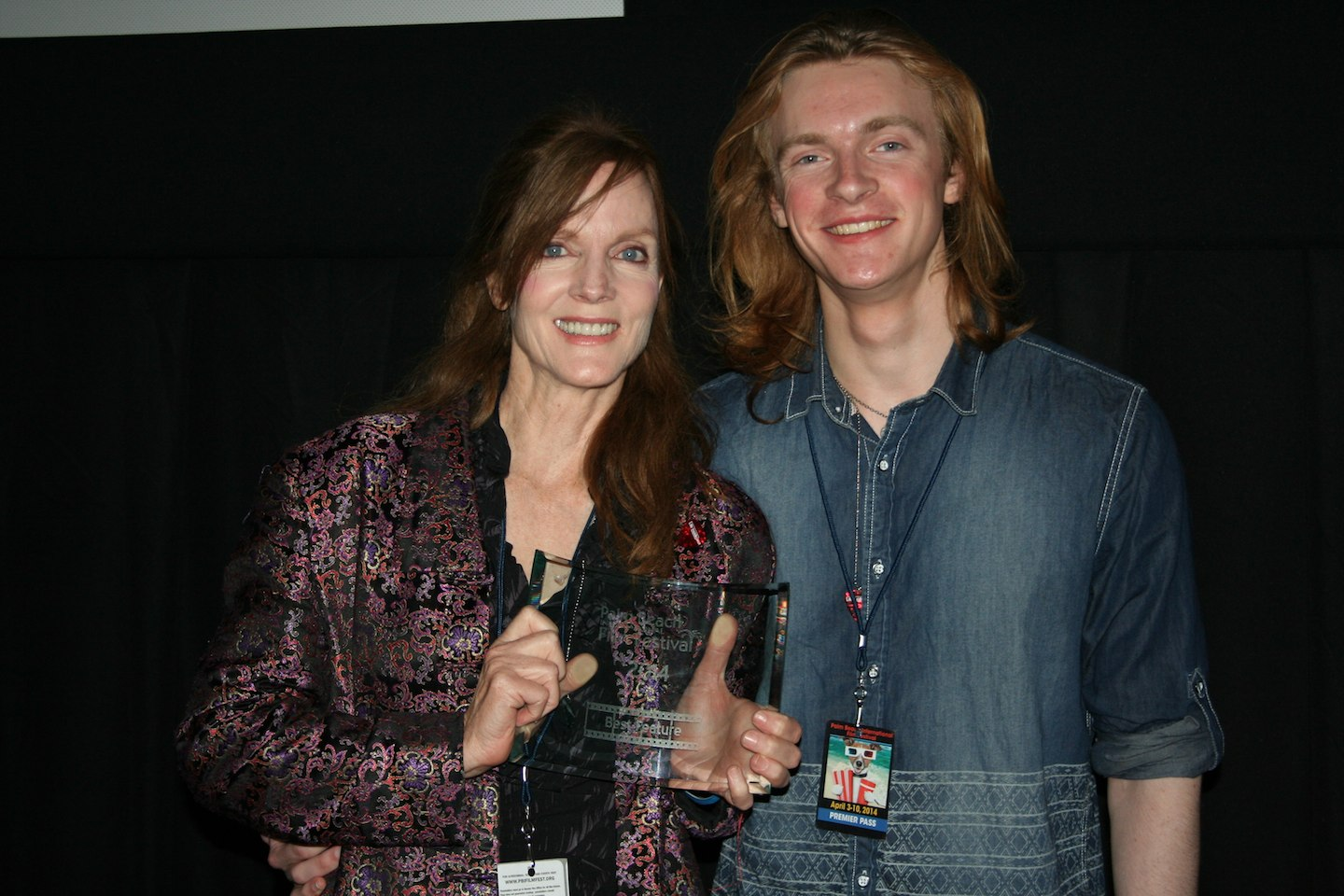
Maggie Baird and Finneas O'Connell receiving the Best Feature award in 2014

Palm Beach International Film Festival was founded in 1996 by Commissioner Burt Aaronson and local philanthropists George Elmore, Keith Waters, Charlotte Pelton and Michael Ostroff. They envisioned the festival as offering an exciting cultural venue for the community and as a fundraising opportunity for educational film and television programs throughout Palm Beach County schools.

The original Palm Beach International Film Festival closed in 2017.

=== Awards ===
The festival became a competitive forum in 2003. The festival jury presented awards in such categories as:

- Best Picture
- Best Documentary
- Best Director
- Best Actor/Actress
- Best Short Film
- Audience Favorite

The festival has not operated since 2017.
