= Beth Grant =

American actress (born 1949)

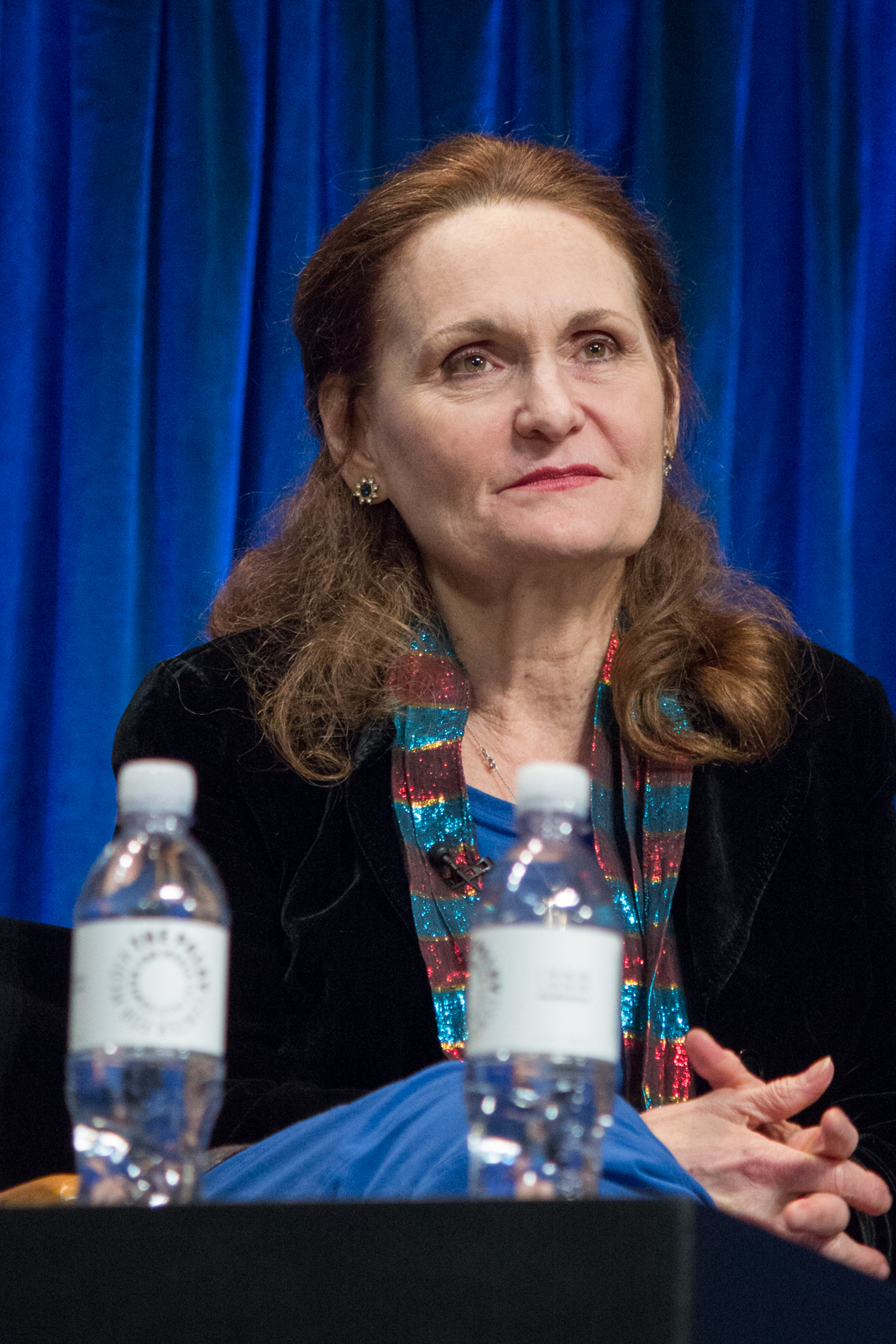
- Grant in 2013
- Born: September 18, 1949 (age 77); Gadsden, Alabama, U.S.
- Education: East Carolina University
- Occupation: Actress
- Years active: 1979–present
- Spouse: Michael Chieffo (m. 1985)
- Children: Mary Chieffo

Beth Grant (born September 18, 1949) is an American character actress known for playing "quirky and emotionally complex characters".

Her credits include Rain Man (1988), Child's Play 2 (1990), Flatliners (1990), Speed (1994), To Wong Foo, Thanks for Everything! Julie Newmar (1995), A Time To Kill (1996), Sordid Lives (2000), Donnie Darko (2001), Wonderfalls (2004), Little Miss Sunshine (2006), Jericho (2006–2007), No Country for Old Men (2007), Pushing Daisies (2008), Dear Lemon Lima (2009), The Artist (2011), The Mindy Project (2012–2017), Mockingbird Lane (2012), As I Lay Dying (2013), Bad Words (2013), Faults (2014), Consumed (2015), Jackie (2016), Lucky (2017), A Series of Unfortunate Events (2019), Dollface (2019–2022), Willy's Wonderland (2021), Grace and Frankie (2022), Mayfair Witches (2023), Carol & the End of the World (2024), and The Bondsman (2025).

== Early life ==
Grant was born on September 18, 1949, in Gadsden, Alabama. She grew up in Wilmington, North Carolina and graduated from New Hanover High School in Wilmington in 1967. Her father was a poultry specialist and salesman. Her mother worked as a manager for the North Carolina Employment Security Commission and was an activist for the Equal Rights Amendment. Grant credits her mother with providing her the inspiration to become an actress.

Grant graduated from East Carolina University in 1973 with a Bachelor of Fine Arts in Acting and Directing and then moved to New York City to pursue a career in acting.

== Career ==
Grant has appeared in a wide range of films, including three Oscar Best Picture winners: as Mother at Farm House in Rain Man; Helen in Speed; Loretta in To Wong Foo, Thanks for Everything! Julie Newmar; Love Field; Kitty Farmer in Donnie Darko; Cora Mae Cobb in A Time to Kill; Pageant Official Jenkins in Little Miss Sunshine; Child's Play 2; Daltry Calhoun; City Slickers II: The Legend of Curly's Gold; Don't Tell Her It's Me; Matchstick Men; Factory Girl; The Wizard; Sordid Lives; The Rookie; All About Steve; Carla Jean's dying Mother in No Country for Old Men, Extract, Crazy Heart, Rango, Hollywood to Dollywood (as herself), and Dance with Me.

Grant has appeared in many TV shows, including Coach; Everwood; Delta; The Golden Girls; Malcolm in the Middle; The X-Files; Friends; CSI; Six Feet Under; Wonderfalls; Pushing Daisies; My Name Is Earl; Yes, Dear; King of the Hill; The Office; Angel; Judging Amy; Jericho; Sordid Lives: The Series; Criminal Minds, Sabrina The Teenage Witch; True Blood; How I Met Your Mother; Modern Family; and The Mentalist;

Between 2012 and 2017, she was a series regular as Beverly Janoszewski, in the television comedy The Mindy Project. She is also known for her role as Gracie Leigh in the CBS post-apocalyptic, the drama Jericho. Grant played Arianne Marie Beetle, in the short-lived show Wonderfalls and Pushing Daisies, both created by Bryan Fuller, and portrays the similarly named "Marie" in Mockingbird Lane, Fuller's re-imagining of The Munsters.

Grant guest-starred as Gillian, Brady Kelly's mother, in the third season of the sitcom Husbands.

Grant received the award on behalf of the cast for 2014 Chlortrudis Best Ensemble winner, for her role as Annie Bundren in the film As I Lay Dying (2013). Inspired by Mindy Kaling, Grant is also in the process of writing a Broadway musical, set in 1969 Greenwich Village.

Grant was nominated as Best Supporting Performance Female at the 2016 Milan Film Festival for her role as Kristin Kessler; Sophie's diabetic mother and Garrett's grandmother in Consumed (2015). She later portrayed the recurring role of "The Woman with Hair but No Beard" in Netflix's A Series of Unfortunate Events (2019), and the Cat Lady in Hulu's Dollface (2019–2022).

She had regular slots Dr. Louise Gelson in Grace and Frankie (2022), as Carlotta Mayfair in Mayfair Witches (2023), as Pauline Kohl in Carol & the End of the World (2024), and played Kitty Halloran in The Bondsman (2025).

== Personal life ==
Grant married actor Michael Chieffo in 1984 or 1985. The couple have one daughter, actress Mary Chieffo. Grant lives with her family in Los Angeles.

== Filmography ==
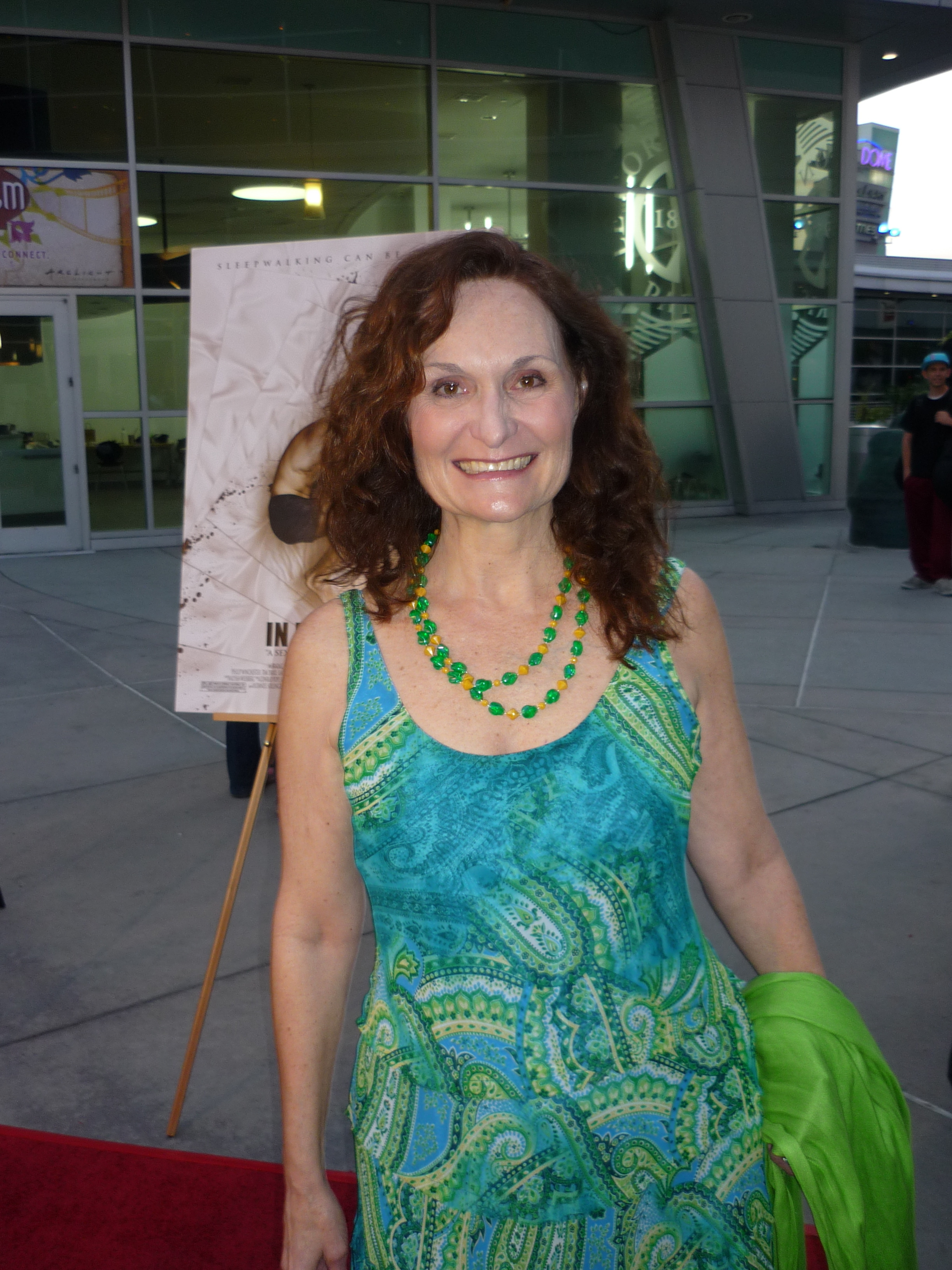
Grant at the premiere of In My Sleep in 2010

=== Film ===
Year	Title	Role	Notes
1987	Under Cover	Miss Randolph	first film role
1988	Rain Man	Mother at Farm House	first major film role
1989	The Wizard	Diner Manager	
1990	Flatliners	Housewife	
1990	Don't Tell Her It's Me	Babette	
1990	Welcome Home, Roxy Carmichael	Lillian Logerfield	
1990	Child's Play 2	Elizabeth Kettlewell	
1990	Eating	Carla	
1992	White Sands	Roz Kincaid	
1992	Love Field	Hazel	
1993	The Dark Half	Shayla Beaumont	
1994	Speed	Helen	
1994	City Slickers II: The Legend of Curly's Gold	Lois	
1995	Safe	Becky – Auditorium Speaker	
1995	To Wong Foo, Thanks for Everything! Julie Newmar	Loretta	
1995	Lieberman in Love	Linda Baker	short film
1996	A Time to Kill	Cora Mae Cobb	
1996	Love Always	Stephanie	lost film
1997	A Thousand Acres	Roberta	
1997	Lawn Dogs	Trent's Mother	
1997	Interruptions	Peggy, the Mistress	
1998	Dr. Dolittle	Woman	
1998	Dance with Me	Lovejoy	
1998	Making Sandwiches	Mrs. Hellman	short film
1998	Angelmaker	Mrs. Turcott	short film
2000	Sordid Lives	Sissy Hickey	
2001	Donnie Darko	Kitty Farmer	
2001	The Rising Place	Melvina Pou	
2001	Pearl Harbor	Motherly Secretary	
2001	Rock Star	Mrs. Cole	
2002	Desert Saints	Lou	
2002	The Rookie	Olline	
2002	Birdseye	Ruth Betters	
2003	Judge Koan	Brenda Lundy	
2003	Matchstick Men	Laundry Lady	
2003	Evil Alien Conquerors	Sheila	
2004	Sweet Union	Mama Iris Bailey	short film
2004	A One Time Thing	Mom	
2005	Our Very Own	Virginia Kendal	
2005	Homefront	Pam	short film
2005	Daltry Calhoun	Dee	
2005	Hard Pill	Mom	
2006	Little Miss Sunshine	Pageant Official Jenkins	
2006	Hard Scrambled	Alice	
2006	Hot Tamale	Dori Woodriff	
2006	Southland Tales	Dr. Inga Von Westphalen / Marion Card	
2006	The House of Usher	Mrs. Thatcher	
2006	Flags of Our Fathers	Mother Gagnon	
2006	Factory Girl	Julia Warhol	
2006	These Days	Maureen	
2006	Rocker	Mrs. Hill	
2007	Magnus, Inc.	Magnus' Mom	short film
2007	The Ungodly	Emma Lemac	
2007	No Country for Old Men	Agnes Kracik	
2007	Welcome to Paradise	Frances Loren	
2008	Natural Disasters	Beth	
2008	Henry Poole is Here	Josie	
2008	Hide	Candy	
2008	No Place Like Home	Mom	short film
2008	Polar Opposites	General Railen	
2008	Winged Creatures	Carla's Mom	
2009	Dear Lemon Lima	Principal Applebomb	
2009	Door Prize	N/A	short film
2009	Extract	Mary	
2009	All About Steve	Mrs. Horowitz	
2009	Stolen	Older Edvena	
2009	Abracadabra	Patti	short film
2009	Herpes Boy	Mom	
2009	Crazy Heart	JoAnn	
2010	In My Sleep	Evelyn	
2010	Spork	Principal Tulip	
2010	Operation: Endgame	Susan	
2011	Rango	Bonnie	voice role
2011	Sedona	Deb	
2011	Life of Lemon	Phyllis	
2011	Valley of the Sun	Marva	
2011	The Artist	Peppy's Maid	
2011	Serenity House	Judith Levine-Bluestone	short film
2011	Mister Handsome	Emily's Mom	short film
2012	Swerve	Alsa	
2012	Blues for Willadean	Willadean Winkler	
2013	Miss Dial	Mrs. Wojiechowski	
2013	The Violation	Linda Helm	short film
2013	As I Lay Dying	Addie Bundren	Chlortrudis Best Ensemble winner
2013	Bad Words	Irene	
2014	The Midnight Swim	Amelia Brooks	
2014	Alex of Venice	Teacher	
2014	Just Before I Go	Mrs. Lawrence	
2014	The Bridge Partner	Mattie	short film
2014	Faults	Evelyn	
2015	Addicted to Fresno	Tilda	
2015	Band of Robbers	Widow Douglass	
2015	Consumed	Kristin Kessler	1 Nomination at 2016 MIFF
2016	Six LA Love Stories	Meg Albright	
2016	Jackie	Lady Bird Johnson	
2017	Heartland	Crystal	
2017	Andover	Rebecca	
2017	Lucky	Elaine	
2017	The Concessionaires Must Die!	Coupon Lady	
2017	The Long Home	Mrs. Winer	post-production
2018	Mississippi Requiem		
2018	Hover	Joana	
2019	Hold On	Shelly	
2020	Wander Darkly	Patty Healy	
2020	Fully Realized Humans	Tipper	
2020	Words on Bathroom Walls	Sister Catherine	
2021	Willy's Wonderland	Sheriff Eloise Lund	
2021	Grave Intentions	Mattie Whalen	
2021	The Long Home	Mrs. Winer	
2022	Amsterdam	Mrs. Dillenbeck	
2022	Confessions of a Closeted People Pleaser	Mom	
2023	Maximum Truth	Mary Jo Nackserson	
2026	Remarkably Bright Creatures	Barb Vanderhoof	

=== Television ===
Year	Title	Role	Notes
1979	B.J. and the Bear	Miss	first onscreen role
1986	CBS Schoolbreak Special	Waitress	episode: God, the Universe & Hot Fudge Sundaes
1987	Deadly Care	Madge	TV movie
1987	Santa Barbara	Nurse	episode: 1,748
1987	Hooperman	N/A	episode: The Answer My Friend Is Passing in the Wind
1987	Mr. Belvedere	Mrs. Meyers	episode: G.I. George
1989	I Know My First Name Is Steven	Mrs. Beta	miniseries
1989–1991	The Golden Girls	Louise/Terry Franco	2 episodes: Two separate roles for each episode
1989–1993	Coach	Martha/Maid	recurring role: 7 episodes
1990	The Image	Martha Packard	TV movie
1990	Empty Nest	Helen	episode: M.D., P.O.V.
1990	Fall from Grace	Paulene	TV movie
1990	The Outsiders	Mrs. Jones	episode: Union Blues
1990	Dragnet	Mrs. Furber	episode: Pretty Girl
1990	Hunter	Dottie Pinder	2 episodes
1991	Switched at Birth	Sophie	TV movie
1992	Overkill: The Aileen Wuornos Story	Pat McGinty	TV movie
1992–1993	Delta	Thelma Wainwright	first series regular role
1993	Bakersfield P.D.	Donna Stiles	recurring role: 2 episodes
1993	Dream On	Farm Woman	episode: Silent Night, Holy Cow Part II
1994	Murder, She Wrote	Meg Thomas	episode: Roadkill
1994	Sweet Justice	Mrs. Farragut	episode: High School Confidential
1994	Friends	Lizzy	episode: The One with the Thumb
1995	Sister Sister	Angie	episode: Weird Science (Season 3)
1996	Norma Jean & Marilyn	Grace Goddard	TV movie
1996–1998	Something so Right	Nurse Gruber	recurring role: 2 episodes
1997	The Pretender	Mrs. Haring	episode: Bomb Squad
1997	To Dance with Olivia	N/A	
1997	Goode Behavior	Pearl	episode: Goode Behavior
1997	Desert's Eagle	N/A	TV short
1997–1998	Sabrina, the Teenage Witch	Mrs. Grant / Mrs. Popowski	recurring role: 3 episodes (two separate roles)
1998	Profiler	Cook	episode: Birthright
1998	Cybill	Waiter's Mother	episode: Whose Wife Am I, Anyway?
1998	Maximum Bob	Inez Crowe	recurring role: 5 episodes
1998	Maggie Winters	Beatrice	episode: Suburban Myth
1998	Five Houses	Arlene	TV movie
1998–2010	King of the Hill	Various voices	11 episodes
1999	Two Guys and a Girl	Tufts College Employee	episode: Two Guys, a Girl and Graduation
1999	Providence	Lillian Gerrish	episode: If Memory Serves
1999	Blue Valley Songbird	Ruby	TV movie
1999	Angel	Maude Pearson	episode: Rm w/a Vu
2000	The X-Files	Iris Finster	episode: "Signs and Wonders"
2000–2003	Malcolm in the Middle	Dorene Hooper	recurring role: 2 episodes
2001	Diagnosis: Murder	Penelope	episode: No Good Deed
2001	Murder, She Wrote: The Last Free Man	Louisa Ashland	TV movie
2001	Any Day Now	Dorothy Johnson	episode: Everyone Deserves to Be Loved
2001	Judging Amy	Principal Mott	episode: Darkness for Light
2001–2004	Yes, Dear	Kitty Hughes	recurring role: 4 episodes
2002	CSI: Crime Scene Investigation	Sally Roth	episode: The Execution of Catherine Willows
2002–2003	Everwood	Miss Violet	recurring role: 3 episodes
2003	Boomtown	Landlady	episode: Lost Child
2004	Six Feet Under	Dorothy Sheedy	episode: In Case of Rapture
2004	A Thief of Time	Ranger Mildred Luna	TV movie
2004	Wonderfalls	Marianne Marie Beetle	episode: Muffin Buffalo
2004	JAG	Senator Maria Tsangrides	episode: "Whole New Ball Game"
2005	Mystery Woman: Mystery Weekend	Angela	TV movie
2005	8 Simple Rules	Mrs. Whitley	episode: Freaky Friday
2006	My Name is Earl	Lorraine Mariano	episode: Van Hickey
2006–2007	Jericho	Gracie Leigh	recurring role: 10 episodes
2007	Drive	The Waitress	episode: Partners
2007	Bones	Lizbeth Harding	episode: The Secret in the Soil
2007	Polly and Marie	Bell	TV movie
2008	According to Jim	Mrs. Whitney	episode: All Dolled Up
2008	Sordid Lives: The Series	Sissy Hickey	series regular
2008	Pushing Daisies	Marianne Marie Beetle	episode: Comfort Food
2008, 2013	The Office	Melvina	2 episodes: "Dinner Party" & "Junior Salesman"
2010	Medium	Librarian	episode: "Dear Dad"
2010	Criminal Minds	Anita Weld Roycewood	episode: "Mosley Lane"
2010	A Drop of True Blood	Joanne Smallwood	webseries: "Episode – Bill"
2011	Futurestates	June	episode: "Spring of Sorrow"
2011	American Dad!	voice	episode: "Gorillas in the Mist"
2012	Modern Family	Maxine	episode: "Tableau Vivant"
2012	BlackBoxTV	Mom/Donna	episode: "AEZP: The Hollow"
2012	Dexter	Donna Randall	episode: "Buck the System"
2012	Mockingbird Lane	Marianne Marie Beetle	TV movie
2012–2017	The Mindy Project	Beverly	main cast (season 1–6); 79 episodes
2013	Justified	Mother Truth	episode: "Where's Waldo"
2013	Grey's Anatomy	Sheila Olsen	episode: "The End Is the Beginning Is the End"
2013	The Secret Life of the American Teenager	Victoria	recurring role: 2 episodes
2013	Husbands	Gillian Kelly	episode: "I Do Over"
2013	The Millers	Myra	episode: "Giving the Bird"
2014	I Didn't Do It	Judy Tanzer-Dinkins	episode: "Now Museum, Now You Don't"
2016–2017	One Mississippi	Mellie Saint-Clair	4 episodes
2016	Con Man	Susan	episode: "What Goes Up..."
2017	American Gods	Jack	2 episodes
2017	Animals.	Auntie May (voice)	episode: "Dog."
2019	A Series of Unfortunate Events	The Woman with Hair but No Beard	3 episodes
2019–2022	Dollface	Cat Lady	recurring
2020	Beef House	Eric's Mother	episode: "Crab Dip"
2020	Teenage Bounty Hunters	Church Lady	episode: "Ham's Good"
2021	Goliath	Judge Meredith Reiss	5 episodes
2022	Slippin' Jimmy	Ms. Retch & Mrs. Brockfrater	
2022	Grace and Frankie	Dr. Louise Gelson	
2023	Mayfair Witches	Carlotta Mayfair	5 episodes
2023	Carol & the End of the World	Pauline Kohl	4 episodes
2025	The Bondsman	Kitty Halloran	Main Role
2025	Digman!	Laverne Dawson (voice)	Episode: “Jack and Rose”
2025	Haunted Hotel	Aunt Rose (voice)	Episode: “Aunt Rose”
2026	Malcolm in the Middle: Life's Still Unfair	Herself	Episode 4 (Cameo)

=== Stage ===
Year	Title	Role	Notes
1971	Holy Ghosts	Nancy Shedman	East Carolina Playhouse
1983	On A Southern Journey	Ana	Spirit Square
1986	Picnic	Irma Kronkite	Ahmanson Theatre
1988	Summer and Smoke	Mrs. Bassett	Ahmanson Theatre
1996	Sordid Lives	Aunt Sissy	Zephyr Theater, Los Angeles
2000	The Day Emily Married	Lyd Davis	Ruth B. Shannon Center for the Performing Arts
2003	The Trials and Tribulations of a Trailer Trash Housewife	Willadean Winkler	Zephyr Theater, Los Angeles
2009	Cornelia	Ruby	The Globe Theatre
2010	Grace and Glorie	Grace	The Colony Theatre
2011	Still Life	Georgia O'Keefe	Latino Theater Company, Workshop
2011	Tricks the Devil Taught Me	Betty	Minetta Lane Theatre, Off-Broadway
2017	Miracle on 34th Street	Charlene	Pasadena Playhouse

== Awards and nominations ==
Year	Award	Category	Work	Result	Ref.
2010	Los Angeles Drama Critics Award		Del Shores	Won	
2010	2010 Ovation Awards	Lead Actress in a Play	Grace & Glorie	Won	
2012	SoHo International Film Festival	Best Short Film (Audience award)	The Perfect Fit (Short)	Won	
2014	Chlotrudis Society for Independent Films	Chlortrudis Best Ensemble winner	As I Lay Dying (2013)	Won	
2016	Milan Film Festival	Best Supporting Performance Female	Consumed (2015)	Nominated	
