= Will & Grace season 11 =

Season of television series

Will & Grace
- Season 11
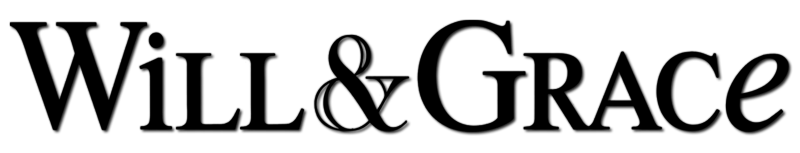
- The intertitle used in the show's 2017 revival
- No. of episodes: 18

Release
- Original network: NBC
- Original release: October 24, 2019 – April 23, 2020

Season chronology
- ← Previous; Season 10

The eleventh and final season of the American comedy series Will & Grace premiered on October 24, 2019, and consisted of 18 episodes, ending on April 23, 2020. The season was initially going to premiere midseason, but was moved up after the cancellation of Sunnyside.

== Production ==
In March 2018, NBC ordered five more episodes for Will & Grace's revival's second season, bringing the total to 18 episodes, and it was also renewed for an 18-episode third season. On July 25, 2019, it was announced that the eleventh season will be the final season of the series after mutual agreement between the show's cast and creators.

It was reported on October 24, 2019, that Megan Mullally would be absent from two episodes of this season amidst rumors of alleged on-set tension between her and co-stars Debra Messing and Sean Hayes. Mullally was absent from the seventh episode, "What a Dump," and the tenth episode, "Of Mouse and Men." After missing the two episodes, Mullally returned to complete the series. Mullally alluded to being "bullied" by Messing on set during an episode of her podcast co-hosted by her husband Nick Offerman.

Show creators David Kohan and Max Mutchnick said the season would tackle a number of issues such as the MeToo movement and address ignorance towards bisexuality, as well as a finale that focused on a less heteronormative ending.

The cast of the series were reported to have made a significant increase in salary per episode for the final season with the lead actors being paid $470,000 per episode for the reboot series, an increase from the previous series where the lead actors were being paid $150,000 per episode. NBC was said to be paying $3.5 million per episode for the show.

Emmy nominated production designer Glenda Rovello who had been nominated for her work on the previous season also returned for the final season. Rovello hinted that the sets in the final season would be the most extravagant seen so far. One of the most notable works from the production team was the replica set and costumes created for the episode “We Love Lucy”. The production team created “45 custom-made costume pieces; built exact replicas of the Ricardo apartment, candy factory, Italian wine vineyard and television studio from the Vitameatavegamin commercial; and brought in 14,000 pieces of the same milk chocolate-covered buttercream from See’s Candy, 1,200 pounds of black grapes for wine-stomping and 48 bottles to match the original Vitameatavegamin prop.” .

== Awards and nominations ==
Season 11 of Will & Grace received a total of 5 Primetime Emmy Award nominations for Season 11 from the Academy of Television Arts & Sciences. Will & Grace has received a total of 18 awards and 88 nominations during its entire run.

| Year | Category | Nominee | Result | Ref |
|---|---|---|---|---|
| 2020 | Outstanding Directing for a Comedy Series | James Burrows (for "We Love Lucy") | Nominated | |
| 2020 | Outstanding Production Design for a Narrative Program (Half-Hour or Less) | Glenda Rovello, Conny Marinos, Peter Gurski (for "We Love Lucy") | Nominated | |
| 2020 | Outstanding Cinematography for a Multi-Camera Series | Gary Baum (for "Accidentally on Porpoise") | Nominated | |
| 2020 | Outstanding Multi-Camera Picture Editing for a Comedy Series | Peter Beyt (for "We Love Lucy") | Nominated | |
| 2020 | Outstanding Multi-Camera Picture Editing for a Comedy Series | Joseph Fulton (for "What a Dump") | Nominated | |

== Cast and characters ==
=== Main ===
- Eric McCormack as Will Truman
- Debra Messing as Grace Adler
- Megan Mullally as Karen Walker
- Sean Hayes as Jack McFarland

=== Recurring ===
- Brian Jordan Alvarez as Estéfan Gloria-McFarland
- Matt Bomer as McCoy Whitman
- Patton Oswalt as Danley Walker

=== Special guest stars ===
- Chris Parnell as Dr. DiLorenzo
- Vanessa Bayer as Amy/Friday
- Demi Lovato as Jenny
- Miss Coco Peru as Herself
- Aileen Quinn as Ramona Delaney
- Joel McHale as Phil
- Ryan Phillippe as Himself
- Gus Kenworthy as Slutty Steve
- Billie Lourd as Fiona Adler
- Tim Bagley as Larry
- Lucie Arnaz as Factory Boss
- Leslie Jordan as Beverly Leslie
- Minnie Driver as Lorraine Finster

=== Guest ===
- Patricia Belcher as Ellie
- Livia Treviño as Mrs. Timmer
- Reid Scott as Marcus
- Paul Ben-Victor as Mario
- Dylan Riley Snyder as DJ
- Charles Berthoud as Paolo
- Karan Soni as Mike
- Ali Wentworth as Dr. Superstein
- Meredith Salenger as Lucy
- Ben Giroux as Grief Panda
- Nicole Sullivan as Ruth
- T.R. Knight as Dexter Murphy
- Christopher Thornton as Luke
- Matt Cook as Ross Elliot
- Sarah Baker as Cathy

== Episodes ==
| No. overall | No. in season | Title | Directed by | Written by | Original release date | U.S. viewers (millions) |
|---|---|---|---|---|---|---|
| 229 | 1 | "Eat, Pray, Love, Phone, Sex" | James Burrows | David Kohan & Max Mutchnick and Jon Kinnally & Tracy Poust | October 24, 2019 | 2.28 |
| 230 | 2 | "Pappa Mia" | James Burrows | Suzanne Martin | October 31, 2019 | 2.63 |
| 231 | 3 | "With Enemies Like These" | James Burrows | John Quaintance | November 7, 2019 | 2.17 |
| 232 | 4 | "The Chick or the Egg Donor" | James Burrows | Jordan Reddout & Gus Hickey | November 14, 2019 | 2.16 |
| 233 | 5 | "The Grief Panda" | James Burrows | Jon Kinnally & Tracy Poust | November 21, 2019 | 2.19 |
| 234 | 6 | "Performance Anxiety" | James Burrows | John Quaintance | January 9, 2020 | 2.39 |
| 235 | 7 | "What a Dump" | James Burrows | Suzanne Martin | January 16, 2020 | 2.13 |
| 236 | 8 | "Lies & Whispers" | James Burrows | Adam Barr | January 23, 2020 | 2.32 |
| 237 | 9 | "Bi-plane" | James Burrows | Aaron Huffines & C.R. Honce | February 6, 2020 | 2.35 |
| 238 | 10 | "Of Mouse and Men" | James Burrows | Adam Barr | February 13, 2020 | 1.97 |
| 239 | 11 | "Accidentally on Porpoise" | James Burrows | Suzanne Martin | February 20, 2020 | 1.95 |
| 240 | 12 | "Filthy Phil" | James Burrows | Jon Kinnally & Tracy Poust | February 27, 2020 | 2.06 |
| 241 | 13 | "Filthy Phil" | James Burrows | Adam Barr | March 5, 2020 | 2.10 |
| 242 | 14 | "The Favourite" | James Burrows | Laura Kightlinger | March 12, 2020 | 2.30 |
| 243 | 15 | "Broadway Boundaries" | James Burrows | Jordan Reddout & Gus Hickey | March 19, 2020 | 2.73 |
| 244 | 16 | "We Love Lucy" | James Burrows | John Quaintance | April 9, 2020 | 2.66 |
| 245 | 17 | "New Crib" | James Burrows | Jon Kinnally & Tracy Poust | April 16, 2020 | 2.46 |
| 246 | 18 | "It's Time" | James Burrows | David Kohan & Max Mutchnick | April 23, 2020 | 3.14 |

== Reception ==
=== Ratings ===
Viewership and ratings per episode of Will & Grace season 11
| No. | Title | Air date | Rating/share (18–49) | Viewers (millions) | DVR (18–49) | DVR viewers (millions) | Total (18–49) | Total viewers (millions) |
|---|---|---|---|---|---|---|---|---|
| 1 | "Eat, Pray, Love, Phone, Sex" | October 24, 2019 | 0.5/3 | 2.28 | 0.6 | 1.99 | 1.1 | 4.27 |
| 2 | "Pappa Mia" | October 31, 2019 | 0.6/3 | 2.63 | 0.5 | 1.78 | 1.1 | 4.33 |
| 3 | "With Enemies Like These" | November 7, 2019 | 0.5/3 | 2.17 | 0.6 | 2.02 | 1.1 | 4.19 |
| 4 | "The Chick or the Egg Donor" | November 14, 2019 | 0.4/2 | 2.16 | 0.5 | 1.89 | 0.9 | 4.05 |
| 5 | "The Grief Panda" | November 21, 2019 | 0.5/3 | 2.19 | 0.5 | 1.74 | 1.0 | 3.93 |
| 6 | "Performance Anxiety" | January 9, 2020 | 0.5/3 | 2.39 | 0.5 | 1.74 | 1.0 | 4.13 |
| 7 | "What a Dump" | January 16, 2020 | 0.4/2 | 2.13 | 0.5 | 1.78 | 0.9 | 3.91 |
| 8 | "Lies & Whispers" | January 23, 2020 | 0.5/3 | 2.32 | 0.4 | 1.65 | 0.9 | 3.97 |
| 9 | "Bi-plane" | February 6, 2020 | 0.5 | 2.35 | 0.4 | 1.60 | 0.9 | 3.95 |
| 10 | "Of Mice and Men" | February 13, 2020 | 0.4 | 1.97 | 0.4 | 1.64 | 0.8 | 3.61 |
| 11 | "Accidentally on Porpoise" | February 20, 2020 | 0.4 | 1.95 | 0.4 | 1.55 | 0.8 | 3.50 |
| 12 | "Filthy Phil, Part I" | February 27, 2020 | 0.4 | 2.07 | 0.4 | 1.50 | 0.8 | 3.57 |
| 13 | "Filthy Phil, Part II" | March 5, 2020 | 0.5 | 2.11 | 0.4 | 1.52 | 0.9 | 3.63 |
| 14 | "The Favourite" | March 12, 2020 | 0.5 | 2.30 | 0.4 | 1.45 | 0.9 | 3.76 |
| 15 | "Broadway Boundaries" | March 19, 2020 | 0.7 | 2.70 | 0.4 | 1.45 | 1.1 | 4.15 |
| 16 | "We Love Lucy" | April 9, 2020 | 0.6 | 2.66 | 0.4 | 1.63 | 1.0 | 4.29 |
| 17 | "New Crib" | April 16, 2020 | 0.6 | 2.46 | 0.4 | 1.62 | 1.0 | 4.08 |
| 18 | "It's Time" | April 23, 2020 | 0.5 | 3.11 | 0.5 | 1.75 | 1.0 | 4.86 |

=== Critical response ===
While the previous two seasons of Will & Grace received generally positive reviews, the eleventh and final season received mixed to negative reviews from critics.

Tara Ariano from Vanity Fair criticized the series finale as well as other comparative attempts at television reboots, remarking that "another unnecessary TV revival fizzles out with its second series finale." Ariano also criticized the show for relying too heavily on guest stars in each episode and the rehashing of previous storylines from the original series.

Matthew Gilbert from the Boston Globe described the final season as a "joyless affair", noting that the writing seemed "forced and desperate for material". In regards to the actors he believed that the chemistry between actors that was present in previous seasons had dissipated: "At one point, the Will & Grace four — Debra Messing, Megan Mullally, Eric McCormack, and Sean Hayes — were among TV's best ensembles, with perfectly timed delivery, expert physical comedy, and a familiarity with one another that shone through the material. Now, the crackle is gone and the chemistry feels labored." He also cited the alleged feud between Mulally and other cast members as a possible reason for this.

Cristina Iskander rated the mid-season finale episode of the series "The Grief Panda" two out of five stars, stating the episode was a "sad state of affairs" and draws comparison to the criticized final season of the original series. The "show runners have a rare second chance to get things right, they are completely wasting that opportunity". She also criticized the writing for the episode's guest star Vanessa Bayer, stating that "the show doesn't utilise her character in any way that feels purposeful or even particularly funny."

Sal Cinequemani from Slant wrote positively about the episode "We Love Lucy" and praised the replica set design and costumes made to recreate scenes from the 1950s sitcom I Love Lucy. The production design of "We Love Lucy" was nominated for an Emmy for the category of Outstanding Production Design for a Narrative Program (Half-Hour). Cinequemani praised Messing's performance of character Lucy Ricardo and actress Lucille Ball, saying she "pitch-perfectly fills Lucy's shoes". Cinequemani also praised Mulally's comedic performance playing a number of side characters in the episode.
