= Will & Grace season 10 =

Will & Grace
- Season 10
- No. of episodes: 18

Release
- Original network: NBC
- Original release: October 4, 2018 – April 4, 2019

Season chronology
- ← Previous; Season 9 Next → Season 11

The tenth season of the American comedy series Will & Grace premiered on October 4, 2018. The season concluded on April 4, 2019, and consisted of 18 episodes.

== Production ==
In August 2017, Will & Grace was renewed for a second 13-episode season. In March 2018, NBC ordered five more episodes bringing the total to 18, and it was also renewed for an 18-episode third season. The revival is shot on Stage 22 at Universal Studios Hollywood, as opposed to Stage 17 at CBS Studio Center. Filming ran from July 18 to December 19, 2018.

== Cast and characters ==
=== Main cast ===
- Eric McCormack as Will Truman
- Debra Messing as Grace Adler
- Megan Mullally as Karen Walker
- Sean Hayes as Jack McFarland

=== Recurring ===
- David Schwimmer as Noah Broader
- Brian Jordan Alvarez as Estefan Gloria
- David Douglas as Edward
- Matt Bomer as McCoy Whitman
- Livia Treviño as Mrs. Timmer
- Robert Klein as Martin Adler
- Blythe Danner as Marilyn Truman-Adler
- Samira Wiley as Nikki

=== Special guest stars ===
- Alec Baldwin as Malcolm Widmark
- Leslie Jordan as Beverley Leslie
- Jon Cryer as himself
- Minnie Driver as Lorraine Finster
- Chelsea Handler as Donna Zimmer
- Andrea Martin as Zusanna
- Molly Shannon as Val Bassett
- Tim Bagley as Larry

=== Guest cast ===
- Charles C. Stevenson Jr. as Smitty
- Samuel Faraci as Skip
- Yelyna De Leon as Blanca
- Clinton Leupp as Miss Coco Peru
- Martha Kelly as Patty
- Derek Gaines as Theodore
- Mary McCormack as Janet Adler
- Tucker Smallwood as Professor Henry Rice
- Aya Cash as Olivia Walker
- Barrett Foa as Paul
- Reid Scott as Marcus

== Episodes ==
No. overall	No. in season	Title	Directed by	Written by	Original release date	U.S. viewers (millions)
211	1	"The West Side Curmudgeon"	James Burrows	John Quaintance	October 4, 2018	3.96
Grace runs for office, campaigning for president of the New York Society of Interior Designers, where she meets Noah, the West Side Curmudgeon. Karen asks Will for legal advice when she learns an Italian doctor is "knocking off her knockers." Jack's FaceTime call to his fiancé's family goes awry after using a facial numbing cream for an upcoming surgery.
212	2	"Where in the World is Karen Walker?"	James Burrows	Adam Barr	October 11, 2018	3.40
Karen disappears after seeking help from her friends but, with Grace distracted with her campaign, Will starting a new career teaching law, and Jack avoiding marriage, none of them realize why she has left until Malcolm reveals that he told Stan of their affair. Karen is then served divorce papers.
213	3	"Tex and the City"	James Burrows	John Quaintance	October 18, 2018	3.36
Grace wants the apartment to herself to have sex with Noah, so she sends Will along with Jack to Texas to support Skip at his talent competition. Meanwhile, Karen runs into Beverly Leslie at her sponsored portion of the border wall.
214	4	"Who's Sorry Now?"	James Burrows	Tracy Poust & Jon Kinnally	October 25, 2018	3.22
In a walk down memory lane, Will and Grace embarrassingly read their college love letters, which teaches Grace an important lesson. Jack, now a certified psychic, helps Karen sort through memories of Stan and channels Rosario to reignite her faith in love.
215	5	"Grace's Secret"	James Burrows	Suzanne Martin	November 1, 2018	3.45
Grace takes a road trip with her dad to Schenectady. At a roadside diner, her father's cheeky remarks to a waitress finally lead to her opening up about her story involving one of her old bosses, her father's friend. Meanwhile, Will and Karen engage in a lip-sync battle to decide who will be Jack's best man.
216	6	"Kid 'N Play"	James Burrows	Suzanne Martin	November 15, 2018	2.93
Karen helps Jack with his return to theater and his production of Gaybraham Twinkin' while Grace tries to help Will bond with Noah, who confesses he has a 12-year old daughter.
217	7	"So Long, Division"	James Burrows	Adam Barr	November 29, 2018	2.78
Will convinces Grace that her boyfriend, Noah, is not in the wrong by refusing to let her meet his daughter, Katie. When Grace goes to apologize to Noah, she unintentionally meets Katie. Meanwhile, Will's mom, Marilyn, visits after the death of her beloved dog and becomes upset when she doesn't get the emotional support she expects from her son and Jack gets into an argument with his rec center boss, Theo.
218	8	"Anchor Away"	James Burrows	Alex Herschlag	December 6, 2018	2.86
During Karen's divorce settlement negotiations, Grace and Karen are forced to revisit an old acquaintance. Meanwhile, by mimicking Jack's behavior, Will lands a date with celebrity news anchor McCoy Whitman.
219	9	"Family, Trip"	James Burrows	Tracy Poust & Jon Kinnally	January 31, 2019	3.09
Will, Jack, and Karen discover there is more to chocolate milk than just sugar and dairy. Grace struggles to accept a relationship between her sister, Janet, and a new client.
220	10	"Dead Man Texting"	James Burrows	Jordan Reddout & Gus Hickey	February 7, 2019	3.07
Will invites his boss over for dinner in an attempt to gain a full-time teaching position. When things go awry, Will and Grace find themselves in a very awkward position. Meanwhile, Jack tries to control a rift between Karen and his fiancé, Estefan.
221	11	"The Scales of Justice"	James Burrows	Laura Kightlinger	February 14, 2019	2.94
Will puts together a "Mock Trial," in which Karen and her estranged step-daughter, Olivia, play the plaintiff and defendant. After an embarrassing double wardrobe malfunction, Grace and Jack decide to go on a diet.
222	12	"The Pursuit of Happiness"	James Burrows	John Quaintance & Adam Barr	February 21, 2019	2.63
Will finds out that office dating can come with strings attached. Grace unwillingly mediates the reunion between Karen and Malcolm. Meanwhile, Jack rediscovers his love of acting and learns a valuable lesson.
223	13	"The Real McCoy"	James Burrows	Alex Herschlag	February 28, 2019	2.35
It's election night for the presidency of The New York Society of Interior Design. Grace makes quite an impression on the voters after a run-in with her former nemesis, Val. In desperate need of a date to Jack's wedding, Will attempts to rekindle a relationship with McCoy Whitman.
224	14	"Supreme Courtship"	James Burrows	Jordan Reddout & Gus Hickey	March 7, 2019	2.63
It is Valentine's Day and, in Grace's desperate attempt to buy Noah a gift, she assaults a Supreme Court Judge. Karen meets her favourite author and decides to take matters into her own hands once she discovers the ending isn't what she'd hoped. Jack realises that lying does not pay off after he tries to convince Estefan that Will has a crush on him.
225	15	"Bad Blood"	James Burrows	Adam Barr	March 14, 2019	2.46
Martin and Marilyn join Will and Grace for dinner. Martin gets rushed to hospital and needs a blood transfusion, but refuses to accept one from Will. Grace is incensed, but Will lets it lie because he is tired of fighting for his rights and dignity. When Marilyn finds out, she chastises Martin for his behavior and Will for not standing up for himself. Will explains to Martin the state of gay men's health; Martin apologizes and tells Will he loves him. Marilyn allows Grace to call her "mom," conditionally. Meanwhile, Karen is paying for Jack's wedding, but uses that to monopolize the planning. When she refuses a tacky unicorn-themed dessert station, and also alters his play, Jack disinvites her from the wedding and refuses her financial support. After Karen tells Jack he is like a little sister to her, they reconcile; he accepts her offer to pay for the wedding, including the dessert station.
226	16	"Conscious Coupling"	James Burrows	Tracy Poust & Jon Kinnally	March 21, 2019	2.96
When both of their boyfriends ask to move in, Will and Grace use each other as an excuse to get out of it. A snowstorm traps Karen at the office and Jack in an elevator, where he reunites with old flame Drew and tests his commitment to monogamy.
227	17	"The Things We Do for Love"	James Burrows	John Quaintance	March 28, 2019	3.25
Jack realizes he lost 13 gold coins he is supposed to give Estefan at their wedding to avoid a curse. Will is concerned that Grace is the only one compromising in her relationship with Noah. Karen shows up at a dinner party with her new date, Nikki.
228	18	"Jack's Big Gay Wedding"	James Burrows	Alex Herschlag & Suzanne Martin	April 4, 2019	2.99
Jack and Estefan's romantic wedding in Spain takes a detour when their flight is cancelled, forcing them to get married at the airport by their friend Miss Coco. McCoy's big job offer in London has Will worried about engaging in a long-distance relationship. While dealing with doubts about her current relationship, Grace meets a charming guy at the airport who inspires her to make an impulsive decision. Meanwhile, advice from Smitty makes Karen reconsider her commitment to Nikki and her own sexual orientation.

== Reception ==
=== Ratings ===
Viewership and ratings per episode of Will & Grace season 10
No.	Title	Air date	Rating/share (18–49)	Viewers (millions)	DVR (18–49)	DVR viewers (millions)	Total (18–49)	Total viewers (millions)
1	"The West Side Curmudgeon"	October 4, 2018	1.0/4	3.96	0.9	2.96	1.9	6.73
2	"Where in the World is Karen Walker?"	October 11, 2018	0.8/4	3.40	0.9	2.73	1.7	6.13
3	"Tex and the City"	October 18, 2018	0.9/4	3.36	0.8	2.49	1.7	5.85
4	"Who's Sorry Now?"	October 25, 2018	0.8/3	3.22	0.8	2.39	1.7	5.62
5	"Grace's Secret"	November 1, 2018	0.8/3	3.45	0.8	2.25	1.6	5.70
6	"Kid 'N Play"	November 15, 2018	0.7/3	2.93	0.8	2.31	1.5	5.24
7	"So Long, Division"	November 29, 2018	0.6/3	2.78	0.7	2.20	1.3	4.98
8	"Anchor Away"	December 6, 2018	0.7/3	2.86	0.7	2.24	1.4	5.10
9	"Family, Trip"	January 31, 2019	0.8/4	3.09	0.8	2.62	1.6	5.71
10	"Dead Man Texting"	February 7, 2019	0.8/4	3.07	0.8	2.41	1.5	5.47
11	"The Scales of Justice"	February 14, 2019	0.7/3	2.94	0.7	2.32	1.4	5.27
12	"The Pursuit of Happiness"	February 21, 2019	0.7/3	2.63	0.7	2.36	1.4	4.99
13	"The Real McCoy"	February 28, 2019	0.6/3	2.35	0.7	2.12	1.3	4.48
14	"Supreme Courtship"	March 7, 2019	0.7/3	2.63	0.7	2.20	1.4	4.83
15	"Bad Blood"	March 14, 2019	0.6/3	2.46	0.6	2.10	1.2	4.56
16	"Conscious Coupling"	March 21, 2019	0.7/3	2.96	0.6	1.80	1.3	4.77
17	"The Things We Do For Love"	March 28, 2019	0.7/3	3.25	0.6	1.91	1.3	5.16
18	"Jack's Big Gay Wedding"	April 4, 2019	0.7/4	2.99	0.7	2.06	1.4	5.04
