= Will & Grace season 9 =

Will & Grace
- Season 9
- Promotional poster
- No. of episodes: 16

Release
- Original network: NBC
- Original release: September 28, 2017 – April 5, 2018

Season chronology
- ← Previous; Season 8 Next → Season 10

The ninth season of the American comedy series Will & Grace premiered on September 28, 2017. It comprised 16 episodes, and is the first of three reunion seasons following the series' eighth season in 2006. The season concluded on April 5, 2018.

== Overview ==
10 years after the original run, Will and Grace, now in their late 40s, are back to living with each other following their divorces. However, now newly single, they realized the world and the dating scene underwent significant change when they were married, but they try to keep their boisterous humor in a now more complicated world.

== Production ==
In January 2017, NBC announced that Will & Grace would return for a 12-episode limited series during the 2017–18 season. At the time of the announcement, all four principal cast members (Debra Messing, Eric McCormack, Sean Hayes and Megan Mullally) had already confirmed their return to the revival. An additional four episodes were ordered on August 3, 2017, for a total of 16, as well as a tenth season.

== Cast and characters ==
=== Main cast ===
- Eric McCormack as Will Truman
- Debra Messing as Grace Adler
- Megan Mullally as Karen Walker
- Sean Hayes as Jack McFarland

=== Recurring ===
- Ryan Pinkston as Drew
- Anthony Ramos as Tony
- Mary Pat Gleason as Bridget

=== Special guest stars ===
- Harry Connick Jr. as Dr. Marvin "Leo" Markus
- Michael Angarano as Elliot
- Jane Lynch as Roberta
- Andrew Rannells as Reggie
- Max Greenfield as Eli Wolff
- Leslie Jordan as Beverley Leslie
- Minnie Driver as Lorraine Finster
- Nick Offerman as Jackson Boudreaux
- Molly Shannon as Val Bassett
- Tim Bagley as Larry
- Jerry Levine as Joe
- Bobby Cannavale as Vince D'Angelo
- Jennifer Lopez as herself/Harlee Santos
- Leigh-Allyn Baker as Ellen
- Cheyenne Jackson as Michael
- Vanessa Bayer as Amy
- Alec Baldwin as Malcolm
- Robert Klein as Martin Adler
- Blythe Danner as Marilyn Truman
- Mary McCormack as Janet Adler
- Sara Rue as Joyce Adler

=== Guest cast ===
- Kyle Bornheimer as Lenny
- Charles C. Stevenson Jr. as Smitty
- Eddie Matos as Congressman Steve Sandoval
- Kate Micucci as a page at the White House
- Ben Platt as Blake
- Laura Kightlinger as Nurse Sheila
- Chris Redd as Alvin
- Ramone Hamilton as Jordan
- Jordan Julian as Tasha
- Jet Jurgensmeyer as Skip
- Natalie Dreyfuss as Emma
- Derek Gaines as Theodore
- Brian Posehn as Pete
- Mitch Silpa as Maitre D'
- Emilio Borelli as Mario D'Angelo
- Sterling Sulieman as Ryan
- Rose Abdoo as Aunt Rita
- Jack McGee as Officer Murphy
- Mackenzie Marsh as Angela
- Lauren Weedman as Cheryl
- Andy Buckley as Hank
- Barry Bostwick as Professor Jerry Wise
- Matt Letscher as James Wise
- Andy Favreau as JJ Wise
- Dan Bucatinsky as Neil
- Danielle Weeks as Morgan
- Carly Dutcher as Ilana
- Katarina Demetriades as Brianna
- Brian Jordan Alvarez as Estéfan Gloria

== Episodes ==
No. overall	No. in season	Title	Directed by	Written by	Original release date	U.S. viewers (millions)
195	1	"11 Years Later"	James Burrows	David Kohan & Max Mutchnick	September 28, 2017	10.19
196	2	"Who's Your Daddy"	James Burrows	Tracy Poust & Jon Kinnally	October 5, 2017	7.14
Will and Jack are faced with the harsh reality that they are much older than they used to be when they begin to date younger guys. Grace comes to the realization that she needs Karen more than she thought she did.
197	3	"Emergency Contact"	James Burrows	Nina Pedrad	October 12, 2017	6.72
After having a breast biopsy, Grace is reunited with her ex-husband, Leo, when he's brought in as her emergency contact. While Jack teaches theater to kids at the community center, Karen helps a girl become a young woman.
198	4	"Grandpa Jack"	James Burrows	Alex Herschlag	October 19, 2017	6.69
When Jack gets reunited with his son, Elliot, he learns he has a grandson, Skip, who happens to be gay. While Will and Jack try to bail Skip out of reform camp, Karen helps Grace get her sexuality back.
199	5	"How to Succeed in Business Without Really Crying"	James Burrows	Suzanne Martin & John Quaintance	October 26, 2017	6.79
Grace tries for her biggest job yet: decorating a string of boutique hotels for an obnoxious mogul. Meanwhile, Will is surprised at his reaction to making Senior Partner, Beverley Leslie discloses a secret to Karen, and Jack fights for his half of a winning lottery ticket.
200	6	"Rosario's Quinceañera"	James Burrows	Tracy Poust & Jon Kinnally	November 2, 2017	5.74
After Rosario passes away from a heart attack, Karen decides to throw the party for her that she never had: a quinceañera. While Jack struggles to know how to be there for Karen, Lorraine Finster makes a surprise return to show her support. Will upsets Grace when he leases the office space next to Grace's office without her permission.
201	7	"A Gay Olde Christmas"	James Burrows	John Quaintance	December 5, 2017	7.18
On Christmas Eve, Will, Grace, Jack, and Karen stop at a historical museum so Grace can use the restroom; however, the museum requires them to take the tour before she's allowed to use it. All four find themselves on a more "interactive" tour than they anticipated.
202	8	"Friends and Lover"	James Burrows	Suzanne Martin	January 4, 2018	4.90
Will and Grace take a bread-making class and both end up falling for their celebrity teacher, Jackson Boudreaux. Jack and Karen struggle to get a catchy jingle out of their heads.
203	9	"There's Something About Larry"	James Burrows	Alex Herschlag	January 11, 2018	4.17
Will and Grace learn that Larry has a major crush on Will and Jack and Karen fight off the craziness of Val, who's after Karen's friendship.
204	10	"The Wedding"	James Burrows	David Kohan & Max Mutchnick & Tracy Poust & Jon Kinnally	January 18, 2018	4.39
Vince, Will's ex-boyfriend, invites him to his wedding, prompting Will to reevaluate their relationship and why it ended. A cop exploring his sexuality falls in love with Jack, but his wife is none the wiser. Karen goes on a scavenger hunt.
205	11	"Staten Island Fairy"	James Burrows	Story by : David Kohan & Max Mutchnick; Teleplay by : John Quaintance	February 1, 2018	4.12
While Will and Grace venture into their next business move selling bed linens on QVC, Jack's new love interest outs himself to his wife.
206	12	"Three Wise Men"	James Burrows	Tracy Poust & Jon Kinnally	March 1, 2018	4.00
Grace is shocked when she realizes she slept with three men (the grandfather, the father, and the son) from the same family. Will and Karen spy on her staff at the mansion and produce a telenovela of them.
207	13	"Sweatshop Annie & the Annoying Baby Shower"	James Burrows	John Quaintance	March 8, 2018	3.92
Will and Grace go to Ellen's niece's baby shower. While Jack is shooting scenes with Jennifer Lopez for Shades of Blue, Karen is put in charge of the kids in his acting class and unexpectedly bonds with one of the girls.
208	14	"The Beefcake & the Cake Beef"	James Burrows	Suzanne Martin	March 15, 2018	4.71
Grace and Karen cause commotion at a bakery that refuses to make a cake for the President. Jack cautions Will about moving too fast in his new relationship with his ex, Michael.
209	15	"One Job"	James Burrows	Suzanne Martin & Alex Herschlag	March 29, 2018	3.73
Will and Grace go to Schenectady to celebrate Bobbi Adler's birthday. When Jack gets dumped by Drew, he goes to Karen for support, only to find that she's cheating on Stan with Malcolm.
210	16	"It's a Family Affair"	James Burrows	David Kohan & Max Mutchnick	April 5, 2018	3.63
Will and Grace end up in an awkward position after Grace invites Will's mom, Marilyn, over as revenge for Will inviting Martin, Grace's dad, to move in with them. While Malcolm makes Karen choose between him and Stan, Jack gets over Drew by romancing a flight attendant, Estéfan. A double proposal ensues.

== Reception ==
=== Critical response ===
On Rotten Tomatoes the season has a rating of 88% based on 49 reviews, with an average rating of 6.98/10. The website's consensus reads, "Will & Grace reunites its ever-hilarious cast for a revival season that picks up right where the show left off 11 years ago -- adding a fresh relevance and a series of stories that make sharply funny use of the passage of time." On Metacritic, the season has a weighted average score of 73 out of 100, based on 27 critics, indicating "generally favorable" reviews.

=== Ratings ===
Viewership and ratings per episode of Will & Grace season 9
No.	Title	Air date	Rating/share (18–49)	Viewers (millions)	DVR (18–49)	DVR viewers (millions)	Total (18–49)	Total viewers (millions)
1	"11 Years Later"	September 28, 2017	3.0/10	10.19	2.0	5.65	5.0	15.85
2	"Who's Your Daddy"	October 5, 2017	2.0/7	7.14	1.7	4.36	3.7	11.50
3	"Emergency Contact"	October 12, 2017	1.8/7	6.72	1.5	3.90	3.3	10.62
4	"Grandpa Jack"	October 19, 2017	1.7/6	6.69	1.6	3.90	3.3	10.59
5	"How to Succeed in Business Without Really Crying"	October 26, 2017	1.8/7	6.79	1.5	3.76	3.3	10.55
6	"Rosario's Quinceañera"	November 2, 2017	1.6/6	5.74	1.3	3.48	2.9	9.22
7	"A Gay Olde Christmas"	December 5, 2017	1.8/7	7.18	1.2	3.24	3.0	10.43
8	"Friends and Lover"	January 4, 2018	1.4/5	4.90	0.9	N/A	2.3	N/A
9	"There's Something About Larry"	January 11, 2018	1.1/4	4.17	1.3	3.25	2.4	7.42
10	"The Wedding"	January 18, 2018	1.3/5	4.40	1.1	3.06	2.4	7.46
11	"Staten Island Fairy"	February 1, 2018	1.2/5	4.12	1.0	2.89	2.2	7.01
12	"Three Weiss Men"	March 1, 2018	1.1/4	4.00	1.1	2.97	2.2	6.97
13	"Sweatshop Annie & the Annoying Baby Shower"	March 8, 2018	1.0/4	3.92	1.1	2.96	2.1	6.91
14	"The Beefcake & the Cake Beef"	March 15, 2018	1.2/5	4.71	1.0	2.79	2.2	7.50
15	"One Job"	March 29, 2018	0.9/4	3.73	1.0	2.73	1.9	6.46
16	"It's a Family Affair"	April 5, 2018	0.9/4	3.63	1.0	2.85	1.9	6.47
