= List of Will & Grace characters =

This list provides descriptions of characters on the NBC situation comedy Will & Grace.

== Main characters ==
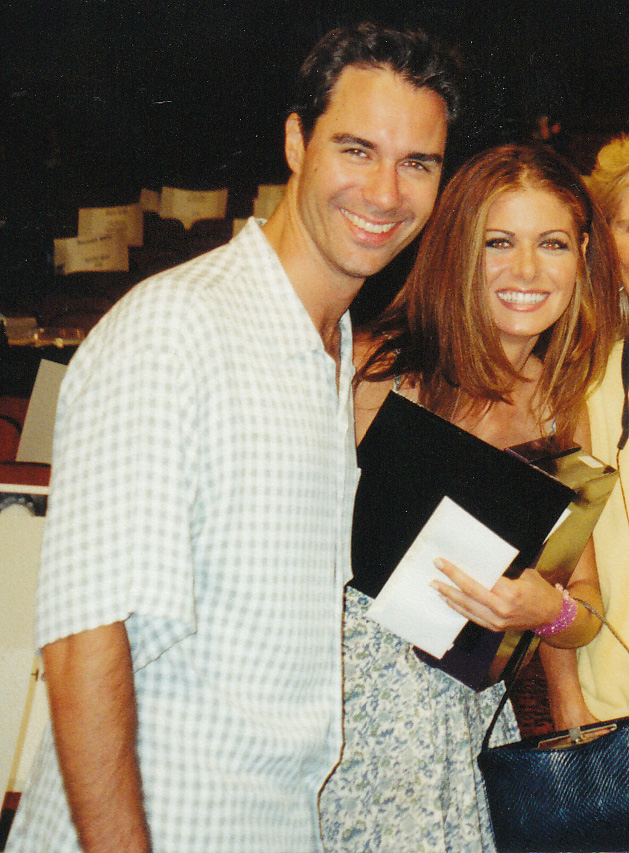
Eric McCormack and Debra Messing in 1999

- Eric McCormack as Will Truman: Will is a gay man working as a corporate lawyer. He studied at Columbia University in New York City, which is where he met his best friend, Grace. Will's personality seems uptight and obsessive. Especially when it comes to cleaning, dressing, and decorating. However, Will sometimes displays a very patient and compassionate nature towards those close to him, often to a fault. Other times, he may appear to be insecure.
- Debra Messing as Grace Adler: Grace is a friendly, out-going woman who owns her own interior design business. Grace has a personality that largely tends to center on herself. She's fond of eating all the time. Grace has been Will's best friend since college, and they have been roommates on the show, although there are times where they've each had their own apartments. Grace is Jewish but does not practice her religion staunchly. She tends to rely on Will for emotional support at times, and her characteristics balance well with Will's uptight nature.
- Megan Mullally as Karen Walker: Karen is Grace's assistant and friend at Grace's interior design business. Karen has, on a few occasions, help Grace score or potentially score some high-profile design jobs. Karen is married to the wealthy (but mostly unseen) Stanley Walker. Because of her husband's wealth, Karen does not actually need a job and she hadn't been cashing her paychecks from work, preferring to "collect" them instead. She mentions at one point that she only took a job to get herself away during the week "from Stan and the kids". Karen is also known for loving alcohol and drugs of any kind, though it is usually played as comedy. She adores Grace and is very close to Jack. She and Will only had a lukewarm relationship for several years, but eventually warmed up to each other during the show's run. Even though she is devoid of manners and seems clueless at times to events happening around her, like her friend Jack, Karen has shown many moments of sharpness. She also has a street-sense sensibility. She is often rude and thoughtless towards the working class or poor people, often criticizing and mocking what she fails to understand.
- Sean Hayes as Jack McFarland: Will's close friend from the time Will was in college. Jack met Will when Jack crashed a college party (as Jack is a few years younger than both Will and Grace) and hid in the closest all night as he was still in high school. Jack is flamboyantly gay, confident, free-spirited, and self-centered. He drifts from man to man, rarely works a job, and when he does work, finds himself changing jobs after a short period of time. He has tried working as an actor, an acting instructor, a backup dancer, a sales associate at Banana Republic and Barneys New York, a cater-waiter, a student nurse, a Junior VP for a network called Out TV, and a host of his own Out TV talk show, called Jack Talk. He has also attempted to be a magician. In addition, he attempted four one-man stage shows in small bars and clubs (called Just Jack, Jack 2000, Jack 2001, and Jack 2002) to showcase his singing/dancing/acting abilities; all having only marginal success. He is close to Will and Grace and is very close to Karen. Jack typically relies on Will, Karen, and his parents for financial support.
- Gary Grubbs as Harlin Polk (season 1; guest season 2): A major client of Will's in season one who ultimately fires Will.
- Shelley Morrison as Rosario Salazar (seasons 3–8; recurring seasons 1–2): Karen's maid, who Karen fights with all the time. The two, however, are very close. For a short time, Rosario was married to Jack, who is gay. Karen arranged this union so Rosario would get a green card and be allowed to stay in the United States. Rosario and Jack later split. Morrison was invited to reprise her role of Rosario during the show's second run but declined as she had retired from acting.
- Michael Angarano as Elliot (season 4; recurring seasons 3, 5–6, 8; special guest season 9): Jack's son. Shortly after Jack learns of the death of his own biological father, whom he never met, Jack finds out he has a child, Elliot, his biological son created from sperm that Jack sold for money years ago to a clinic.

== Supporting characters ==
Actor	Character	Seasons										
Actor	Character	1	2	3	4	5	6	7	8	9	10	11
Gary Grubbs	Harlin Polk	Present	Present									
Leigh-Allyn Baker	Ellen	Present	Present	Present	Present	Present		Present	Present	Present		
Tom Gallop	Rob	Present	Present	Present	Present	Present			Present			
Steve Paymer	Steve	Present	Present		Present	Present						
Debbie Reynolds	Bobbi Adler	Present	Present	Present	Present	Present	Present	Present	Present			
Molly Shannon	Val Bassett	Present	Present	Present	Present			Present		Present	Present	Present
Gregory Hines	Ben Doucette		Present	Present								
Laura Kightlinger	Nurse Sheila		Present		Present	Present	Present		Present	Present	Present	Present
Marshall Manesh	Mr. Zamir		Present	Present	Present	Present						
Sydney Pollack	George Truman		Present	Present	Present				Present			
Michael Angarano	Elliott			Present	Present	Present	Present		Present	Present		
Tim Bagley	Larry			Present	Present	Present	Present	Present	Present	Present	Present	Present
Woody Harrelson	Nathan			Present	Present							
Leslie Jordan	Beverley Leslie			Present	Present	Present	Present	Present	Present	Present	Present	Present
Jerry Levine	Joe			Present		Present	Present	Present	Present	Present		
Sara Rue	Joyce Adler			Present						Present		
Lesley Ann Warren	Tina			Present	Present		Present		Present			
Blythe Danner	Marilyn Truman				Present		Present	Present	Present	Present	Present	Present
Eileen Brennan	Zandra				Present	Present	Present		Present			
Charles C. Stevenson Jr.	Smitty				Present	Present		Present	Present	Present	Present	Present
Rip Torn	Lionel Banks				Present	Present						
Harry Connick, Jr.	Dr. Marvin 'Leo' Markus					Present	Present	Present	Present	Present		
Minnie Driver	Lorraine Finster					Present	Present			Present	Present	Present
Jamie Kaler	Gary					Present		Present	Present			
Emily Rutherfurd	Joanne					Present	Present	Present				
Jon Fleming	Russell					Present	Present	Present				
Bobby Cannavale	Vince D'Angelo						Present	Present	Present	Present		
Alec Baldwin	Malcolm Widmark							Present	Present	Present	Present	
Mathew Botuchis	Dave							Present	Present			
Bernadette Peters	Gin								Present			
Brian Jordan Alvarez	Estefan Gloria									Present	Present	Present
David Schwimmer	Noah Broader										Present	
David Douglas	Edward										Present	
Matt Bomer	McCoy Whitman										Present	Present

=== Family members ===
==== Grace's family ====
- Dr. Marvin "Leo" Markus, portrayed by actor and singer Harry Connick, Jr., is a Jewish doctor and Grace's husband from the fifth season. Leo meets Grace Adler in Central Park while she is on her way to be artificially inseminated with gay best friend Will's baby. After Will finds out that Leo and Grace are dating, they have their biggest fight of the entire series, in which Will tells Grace to move out. Thanks to Jack and Karen's meddling, they forgive each other and Will accepts Grace's relationship. In November 2002, Grace and Leo are married at a spontaneous group ceremony in Central Park, which was supposed to be broadcast on The Today Show. It was later revealed in the storyline that the ceremony was not legal, but the two officially marry at a ceremony soon after. Leo and Grace's relationship was a constant source of tension between Will and Grace, although they eventually achieved a certain accord with each other – Leo even commented to Will at one point that he considered himself essentially married to both of them due to his ability to accept their close relationship. Leo's true first name is Marvin, as revealed by his mother at their wedding reception. According to The Nation Magazine, this was the first time in television history that a Jewish protagonist character had married inside the faith. Grace immediately realizes she does not know as much about Leo as she expected. Their marriage fails after less than two years, when Leo reveals that he had a one-night stand while working in Cambodia for Doctors Without Borders. Leo admits his affair to Will first. Will then refuses to help Leo break the news to Grace. After Leo comes clean about his affair, Grace briefly considers continuing their marriage but quickly decides she wants a divorce. Leo reappears during season eight, a little over a year after the divorce in the storyline, in the episode "Love Is in the Airplane." In the episode, he and Grace have a sexual encounter on an airplane after coincidentally ending up on the same flight to London, though Leo was to continue to Thailand. The result is Grace's pregnancy, as discovered in the season eight episode "The Definition of Marriage". A couple of months later Grace meets Leo, with the intention of telling him that she is pregnant with his baby, but he informs her that he is engaged to another woman, Kate. Consequently, Grace decides not to tell Leo about the pregnancy. In the series finale (May 2006) Leo tells a heavily pregnant Grace that he loves her. Leo has a job as a hospital researcher in Rome, and this is where Grace gives birth. After one year in Rome, Leo and Grace moved back to Brooklyn, where they raise their daughter, Lila, together. Eleven years later in season 9 it was revealed that this was part of Karen's dream.
- Bobbi Adler, Grace's mother, was played by Debbie Reynolds. Bobbi is an actress and singer, although her performances are generally with the Schenectady Players and involve gender-changing roles, in plays such as "Death of a Salesperson", "The Music Person" and "Queen Lear". She has a constant desire to meddle in the love lives of her daughters, is the creator of the Adler family "Told you so" dance, and can always be relied upon to have a song for every occasion. She has, in the past, shown a perfect willingness for Will and Grace to get married. It is mentioned in the Season 9 episode "Rosario's Quinceañera" that she died.
- Martin Adler, Grace's father, played by Alan Arkin and Robert Klein in Season 9. Portrayed by his family as the stereotypical Jewish patriarch, Martin shows genuine affection for Grace, although remarks he has made suggest Joyce is his favorite. He has been known to pinpoint Grace's flaws without looking up from his Kojak and Baretta reruns.
- Janet Adler, Grace's older sister, is played by Geena Davis and Mary McCormack in Season 9. Janet lives in a van and designs jewelry. Her nickname for Grace is "Smudge". It is once implied that she has difficulties with her mother. In the episode "Lows in the Mid-Eighties", Will asks if Grace has another sister named Janet, to which Bobbi, Joyce, and Grace quickly answer "No!"
- Joyce Adler, Grace's younger sister, is played by Sara Rue. It is suggested that Grace and Joyce had a not-too-friendly relationship growing up and that Joyce was formerly a binge eater. She is often hostile to Grace, but one word from Will and she tends to giggle and act girlishly; it appears that she, like Grace before her, has a crush on Will.
- Lila Markus, Grace and Leo's daughter, is played by Maria Thayer. Lila was conceived by Leo and Grace on an aircraft, during a period when her parents were divorced. She was going to be raised by Will and Grace, but her parents remarried shortly before her birth. She appears on screen only during the series finale.
- Warren, played by Jesse Fremont Allis, is the imaginary son of Grace and Leo in a dream that Grace has during the last episode of season 8. Grace and Will raise 'their' son together.

==== Will's family ====
- Vince D'Angelo, played by Bobby Cannavale. An Italian-American police officer, Vince first met Will after giving Karen a ticket for speeding and they started dating after the subsequent hearing. Vince was friends with Joe and Larry and began Will's first long-term relationship in the series' run. Vince broke up with Will, requesting time alone after repeatedly losing his job. He re-encountered Will in season 8 and, during the funeral of Will's father, they acknowledged their mutual feelings, thus rekindling their romance. In the finale, Will and Vince are shown raising a son, Ben, together. 11 years later in season 9 it was revealed that this was part of Karen's dream. He also got remarried in season 9 with Will struggling with Vince moving on.
- Marilyn Truman, Will's mother, is played by Blythe Danner. A (stereo-)typical WASP, Marilyn regularly drinks, collects Lladró statues and treats them as if they were her children, and puts up with her husband's regular affairs until their ultimate separation. She is not a fan of musical theater – once claiming that Les Misérables was unrealistic because "poor people don't sing that much" – but was impressed with Mamma Mia!. She does not like the jokes Grace and Karen make about Will's sexuality, saying, "Is that a gay joke? I don't like that."
- George Truman, Will's father, is played by Sydney Pollack. While he and Will have a close loving relationship, of which both Jack and Grace are envious, it is eventually revealed that he had trouble dealing with telling others of his son's sexuality, initially telling his friends Will was married to Grace. He dies in season 8, only days after having a fight with Will in which he admitted that he would rather that Will was not gay.
- Sam Truman, Will's brother, is played by John Slattery in season one and Steven Weber in season 8. He had a falling-out with Will over comments Will made about his wife, but reconciled after he had a one-night stand with Grace. He eventually divorced his wife and gained full custody of their two children.
- Paul Truman, Will's brother, is played by Jon Tenney. Paul never really came to terms with his brother's sexuality and often behaved like a childish bully, belittling and insulting Will.
- Peggy Truman, Paul's wife and Will's sister-in-law, is played by Helen Slater. She was only shown in one episode and came off as waspish and suspicious of Grace's friendly behavior towards her own husband.
- Tina, George's mistress, is played by Lesley Ann Warren. She began a relationship with George while he was still married to Marilyn, but was dismayed to learn that George was then seeing his ex-wife behind her back. Ultimately she and Marilyn come to an understanding, that they will share George between them without him knowing what is going on. This arrangement apparently ended not long before George's death.
- Jordy Truman, Sam's son, and Will's nephew is played by Reed Alexander. Flamboyant Jordan incenses Will since Marilyn is incredibly accepting of him even though she was not at first accepting of Will. His nickname is Jordy. He is perceived to be gay by the other characters, although he is still a child, because of his flamboyant nature, love of show tunes and musicals, along with his general disposition.
- Casey Truman, Sam's daughter, and Will's niece is played by Kyla Dang. Casey was adopted by Sam and his ex-wife.
- Ben Truman, Will, and Vince's son are played by Ben Newmark. Appearing only during the series finale, Ben was apparently born from a surrogate mother using Will's sperm. Upon going to college, he meets and later marries Grace's daughter, Lila.

==== Karen's family ====
- Stanley "Stan" Walker, Karen's husband, is a mostly unseen character. Karen is his second wife. He is an obese man and has worn a toupee since his teens. Stan has two children from a previous marriage to a woman named Kathy. Karen fell in love with him in the 1980s but they did not marry until 1995. Stan was jailed for tax evasion in season four and began an affair with a cafeteria worker named Lorraine (played by Minnie Driver), and – after his release in season five – continued the affair, ultimately separating from Karen because of it. He is reported to have died at the end of season five but, at the end of season seven, he reveals to Will that he had faked his own death and is hiding out with the aid of the government. He and Karen reconcile in season 8 but subsequently faced marital difficulties and divorce. Stan's popularity with fast food establishments leads to Pizza Hut taking out a full-page ad in the New York Times to congratulate him on his release from prison; Taco Bell also organized a flyover at his funeral. It is revealed in the original series finale that Stan's riches were actually borrowed and that he had no real money of his own, though this and the divorce is disregarded in the 2017 revival as one of Karen's daydreams. Another lengthy divorce occurs in season 10 when Stan discovers that Karen cheated on him with his friend Malcolm Widmark. In the revival finale, Stan asks Karen to take him back, and she realizes that she still loves him. At his direction, she goes to the observation deck of the Statue of Liberty, where they had their first date, but he does not show up. Just as she is about to leave, however, Stan arrives on a helicopter and sends down a note asking her to marry him again. She says yes, and boards the helicopter.
- Mason Walker, Stan's son, is another unseen character. He is known to Karen as "the fat one". During one episode, Karen visits Mason during a swim try-out. She cheers and applauds and has a conversation with him until, in the end, she realizes she has been conversing with the wrong boy and not Mason after all.
- Olivia Walker, Stan's daughter, is played by Hallee Hirsh (child) and Aya Cash (adult). Although she has had fun times with Karen, such as sticking food to the floor to see how long Mason will spend trying to eat it, she also has problems with her stepmother.
- Lois Whitley, Karen's mother, played by Suzanne Pleshette. A con artist who used Karen in her early schemes. They had been estranged for several years before they reconciled in season 4, with the help of Jack.
- Virginia "Ginny" Delaney, Karen's sister, played by Bernadette Peters. In 1963, as a child, she was injured in a brutal game of Twister played with Karen.
- Barry, Karen's cousin, is played by Dan Futterman. Originally a gay bookish homebody, Karen had Will and Jack bring him out of his shell to become an attractive person whom both Will and Jack fall for.
- Sylvia Walker, Karen's mother-in-law, is played by Ellen Albertini Dow. She is a woman that 'strikes fear in her heart-facsimile'. A seemingly kind, but homophobic old woman, Sylvia appears in one episode to accompany Will and Jack to a club. In the beginning, neither Will nor Jack wanted to babysit Sylvia, known as "Syl". She had been dumped on them by Karen, who then ditched her. Karen and Syl have a caustic relationship.
- Sumner, Karen's nephew, is played by Paul Satterfield. Karen tries to keep him from dating Grace in season 3.

==== Rosario Inés Consuelo Yolanda Salazar ====
Karen Walker's put-upon but faithful maid is portrayed by Shelley Morrison. In 1985, Rosario met Karen Walker at a club, while working as a cigarette lady, and went to work for her as a maid, which was where she was working when the series began in 1998. Rosario and Karen are very close, but their relationship is love-hate. They are notorious for swapping insults. Rosario is just as feisty as Karen and is one of the few people who manage to go head-to-head with her. A native of El Salvador, Rosario was a school teacher who received a bachelor's degree in clinical psychology from the University of Texas and who almost got a master's degree. She also attended business school. At some point, she moved to the Bronx, presumably while studying business; however, Karen makes a comment that she bought Rosario from Rosario's parents. While there, she also performed with a then-unknown Jennifer Lopez, including a production of "Tea for Two" at the Shalom Retirement Center. At one point, she was also paid to tape pornographic videos for Tommy Lee. Although she had been mentioned by Karen since the pilot episode, Rosario's first appearance was in the season 1 finale. Due to Karen's patronizing tone, we're made to think that Rosario doesn't speak English well. Rosario actually speaks English fluently, albeit with a thick accent, but is an illegal alien. To keep her in the country, Karen has her marry Jack McFarland, her gay friend, to get a green card. The marriage was later terminated at the end of season 2 when Rosario asked for a divorce in order to pursue other romantic interests. However, she maintained a close relationship with Jack (often echoing hers with Karen) and claimed to still think of him as family. In the series finale, Rosario was shown to have lived with Karen and Jack in the years after the show ended, growing older with them and possibly still working for them despite being in a wheelchair (though she states that she is only in the wheelchair due to a sprained ankle).

In the series reboot in 2017, Rosario died off-camera in Season 9 Episode 6, "Rosario's Quinceañera".

==== Jack's family ====
- Judith McFarland, Jack's mother, is played by Veronica Cartwright. Despite the obvious clues, Judith did not learn about Jack's sexuality until he was 30. She was impregnated with Jack while at a swinger's costume and pool party.
- Daniel McFarland, Jack's stepfather, is played by Beau Bridges. Daniel always had trouble relating to Jack, due to his own athleticism and Jack's lack thereof. Despite Jack's statements to the contrary, Daniel is shown to be a caring man who is at least recently trying to reconnect with Jack.
- Joe Black, Jack's biological father. Never portrayed on screen, Joe was revealed to have attended a swingers costumed pool party during the 60s, where he was dressed as Richard Nixon. During the party he impregnated Judith, who was dressed as the rear end of a horse. He dies several years before Jack discovers that Daniel McFarland is not his biological father.
- Elliott, Jack's son, is played by Michael Angarano. Shortly after learning of his biological father's death, Jack meets Elliott – his biological son created from sperm Jack donated at the age of 17. He is described by Will as, "Polite, sweet, and kind" which, he says, is the reason Karen initially dislikes him. His relationship with Jack is shown to be very close – Jack noting in one episode that he wants to avoid being the kind of father he had as he always regretted the fact that they never really connected. However, they have a brief rift when Elliott prepares to leave for college during the last season.
- Bonnie, Elliott's mother, is played by Rosie O'Donnell. Initially, Bonnie did not want Jack to be included in Elliott's life. Bonnie is a lesbian, but was not open about her sexuality to Elliott. She felt jealous that Jack found it easy to be open with Elliott about his sexuality when she did not feel she could be.
- Estéfan Gloria-McFarland, Jack's husband, is played by Brian Jordan Alvarez. Estéfan, a flight attendant, meets Jack in season 9, as a rebound from a recent breakup of Jack's. Throughout season 10, their relationship builds and leads to a marriage in that season's finale.

=== Friends ===
- Rob and Ellen, Will and Grace's close friends, are played by Tom Gallop and Leigh-Allyn Baker. Ellen and Grace were best friends since college, as were Rob and Will, and the two couples regularly played charades and other games during dinner parties. Grace also sleeps with Rob in season one when they were both going through break-ups and felt emotionally vulnerable, a fact that didn't come up until Rob and Ellen's wedding some years later. The couple did get married, however, and have since had three children, the youngest named Roman (which is the name of Debra Messing's real-life son, born in 2004). Rob and Ellen want to separate, so that they could begin dating other people, and they announce their separation at a dinner date with Will and Grace. Grace makes them realize that they had worked at their marriage and they should remain together; and also keenly reminded them that no one else would have them. Rob and Ellen decided to give their marriage another chance.
- Joe and Larry are Will, Jack and Grace's close friends, and are played by Jerry Levine and Tim Bagley. A gay couple, once party animals, Joe and Larry adopted a baby girl called Hannah in season three. Karen occasionally refers to them as "Mo and Mary", with "Mo" being a play on the word "Homo".
- Val Bassett, a neighbor of Will and Grace, is played by Molly Shannon. Slightly unstable, and alcoholic, Val originally befriends only Will, until Grace eventually discovers some common interests with her. Both of them still consider her unstable, as does Jack, who found her as an uninvited guest in his bedroom. When Grace accidentally attends an AA meeting, she is seen there by Val, who coerces her to stay. Grace pretends to be an alcoholic for the "free food and therapy".
- Beverley Leslie, played by Leslie Jordan, is an effeminate and very short "frenemy" of Karen's. Having a wealthy spouse, as Karen does, Karen and Beverley routinely find themselves traveling in the same society circle of the wealthy and elite. Their relationship is that of friends and enemies. Beverley's wife's name is Crystal and is considerably older than he is. His marriage seems to be held together purely out of his love of Crystal's money. Karen, Will, Grace, and Jack see Beverley as a closeted gay man. He is often seen with a younger attractive man named Benji who appears to be his lover, but Beverley tries to pass him off as a "business associate". When Beverley appears on screen he often catches the other characters by surprise. Sometimes his appearance comes after a character says something that could be comically associated with him. For instance, whilst discussing a dessert, Jack says, "I want something small and fruity, with ladyfingers," and Beverley enters. Beverley and Karen often trade insults, as Karen enjoys ridiculing him for his height. Whenever he appears on screen he can usually be heard saying 'Well, well, well' in an effeminate way. Crystal later dies and Beverley inherits the fortune. Some years later Karen's husband Stan loses his fortune, putting Karen's extravagant lifestyle in jeopardy. Beverley presumably spends several more years with Benji after Crystal's death, and then begins seeing a reluctant Jack, who only dated Beverley to support Karen's excessive spending habits, as she had done for him for so many years. During the series finale Beverley is swept off a balcony by a strong gust of wind and dies, leaving his estate in his will to Jack. In the 2017 revival, this is retconned as one of Karen's daydreams, as Beverley shows up alive and well in the same hotel room Karen is staying, and with another younger male lover, coincidentally also named Benji. During a morphine-induced stupor, Beverley finally admits to Karen that he is gay and seeks her help coming out to his wife, Crystal, whom it turns out had survived her death, coming back to life during her burial, with Beverley wishing he had cremated her. Karen agrees to help, but is frustrated when Beverley reneges on the deal, claiming to have no memory of his "confession". As payback, Karen subjects Beverley to a night of unwanted torrid lovemaking by Crystal.
- Rory, Toby, and Josh are friends of Jack who are never seen, but mentioned in various episodes. Early in Season 3, Rory is mentioned as being into Asian men. In Season 4 Josh, Toby, and Jack watch a video of Will freezing up on camera talking about Stanley Walker, but Josh and Toby leave before Will gets home, mainly because Jack ran out of wine.

=== Love interests ===
==== Grace ====
- Danny, played by Tom Verica, Grace's long-term boyfriend from roughly 1995–1998, whom she nearly marries in the pilot episode. She realizes, after Will advised her against the marriage, that Danny was too immature for her, and practically leaves him at the altar. They reunite at the end of season 1, much to Will's dismay. Yet again Grace decides that she does not love him and, after roughly a week (one episode), Grace breaks up with him off-screen.
- Ben Doucette, played by Gregory Hines, is introduced in mid-season 2. Grace sues him after he violates her contract of employment, firing her without reimbursement for expenses she incurred while decorating his house. Although at first he played Grace and Will, who was representing her, he eventually gave her the money voluntarily and hired Will to work at his renowned law firm. Grace and he disliked each other for the rest of the season, until the season finale when Ben showed her his more humane face, when Will invited him to dine with them. They then started a happy, semi-monogamous relationship that lasted for roughly six months, until they broke up early in Season 3 when they realized that they were not in love.
- Josh, played by Corey Parker. A sweet, romantic New Age-y man whom Grace dates in season 2. Grace often has issues with him being far too affectionate and nice, to the point of being obnoxious. The two broke up because Jack confessed that he had slept with him.
- Mark, played by Ken Marino, is another of Grace's partners in Season 3, "Three's a Crowd, Six is a Freakshow". She dumps him because he has six toes on one foot, although the actual sixth toe was not seen in the episode.
- Nathan, played by Woody Harrelson. Nathan is Grace's neighbor in season 3, who becomes her boyfriend. They appear to be a good match, but early in Season 4 he abruptly proposes to her during sex and she becomes distraught at the unromantic nature of his proposal, forcing him to take it back and ask again in a more romantic way. For several days they are awkward around each other and, fearing that their relationship is over, Grace proposes to Nathan who reluctantly refuses and breaks up with her.
- Nick, played by Edward Burns. A greetings-card writer who falls for Grace when he meets her one Valentine's Day in season 7, after her divorce from Leo. Nick is the first guy Grace starts dating after her divorce with Leo. They decide to break up when he has to go out of the country to work on a screenplay he wrote.
- Tom Cassidy, played by Eric Stoltz. An old friend of Grace's, now married, with whom she reunited briefly at the end of season 7. He asks her to help design his and his wife's hotel, yet she still feels chemistry with him and kisses him. She nearly takes it further, but feels guilty and breaks it off with him at the beginning of season 8.
- Noah Broader, played by David Schwimmer, is a Twitter-based critic known as the West Side Curmudgeon, who Grace encounters at the start of season 10. A relationship deepens, as she moves in with Noah within the season. Will later voices concerns about Grace's relationship compromises being one-sided, and the couple part ways amid plans for Jack and Estefan's wedding.

==== Will ====
- Barry, played by Dan Futterman. Karen sets up her hopeless cousin Barry with Will, shortly after he comes out. Will and Jack soon undertake a Pygmalion-esque attempt at turning Barry into a more confident gay man, ending when Will falls for Barry though Barry wants to play around before settling down.
- James Hanson, played by Taye Diggs. Will meets James at a Manhattan theater and the two have an immediate connection. He later runs into James while on a trip to Los Angeles. James has recently discovered he is going to be deported back to Canada. Grace agreed to marry James so that he can acquire a green card in order to remain in the United States, thus giving James and Will's relationship a chance. However, Will soon discovers James was not who he thought he was, as James began showing himself to be self-centered. Will requests that Grace annul their marriage.
- Matthew, played by Patrick Dempsey, is a sports reporter Will meets at a Banana Republic store while trying to help Jack woo him. Jack and Matt have little in common and Will instead finds himself in a relationship with him. They date for a while but Matt's refusal to come out leads to their break-up.
- Scott, played by Branden Williams, is Will's 23-year-old date in two episodes in season 3, and works at a local video rental shop. Although they get along well together, Will feels self-conscious about dating Scott, who is quite a bit younger than he is. Will agrees to break it off with Scott if Grace agrees to dump Nathan. Grace agrees and Will breaks up with Scott, though Grace keeps on seeing Nathan.
- Diane, played by Mira Sorvino & Lisa Borgnes, is a woman with whom Will has a drunken one-night stand in order to convince himself he was 100% gay after leaving Grace. Diane is also one of Leo's exes. Both of these facts make Grace very jealous. Diane states that Will is much better in bed than Leo. Diane was shown briefly (though she had no lines) in the season 3 episode titled "Lows In the Mid-Eighties", but was played by a writer's assistant, Lisa Borgnes.
- Claire, played by Megyn Price, is Will's high school friend and girlfriend, the first of the only two women Will has ever dated, the second being Grace. She lives in Paris and asks Will to donate sperm so that she can have a baby, but Will realizes that if he was going to donate sperm he wanted to donate it to Grace.
- Michael, played by Chris Potter in season 2 and Cheyenne Jackson in season 9, is a mostly unseen character and is Will's lover of seven years. When the sitcom first appeared, he and Michael had recently broken up. Michael appears in the episode "Hey La, Hey La, My Ex-Boyfriend's Back", which aired on March 14, 2000. He is mentioned occasionally by Will and Grace, and more than once Will refers to him as the love of his life. In the early seasons of the show Will has a hard time letting him go. He and Will begin dating again in season 9, but Will ends it when Michael asks for money.
- McCoy Whitman, played by Matt Bomer, is a TV anchor Will initially tries to date early in season 10, only to find McCoy's taste in men to be shallow. The two connect again later in the season, with Jack's assistance, and develop a long-distance relationship as McCoy accepts a foreign correspondent position in London. After an engagement and talk of raising a child, McCoy says he is not ready to have children and the couple's relationship ends in season 11. In the series finale, McCoy changes his mind about children and he and Will get back together.

==== Karen ====
- Lyle Finster, played by John Cleese. Lyle is the father of Stan's mistress, Lorraine. He becomes Karen's fourth husband for about 20 minutes until the couple realize how little they had in common outside of the bedroom.
- Scott Woolley, played by Jeff Goldblum. Woolley is the man who lost to Karen for Student Body President and has spent his life hatching schemes to ruin her. Sadly, his schemes are often poorly thought out and eventually Grace realises that he does not hate Karen, he loves her. However, his attempts to woo her are as misguided as his previous ones. Woolley also has a dreadful sense of word-play (e.g., "The Scotty Mammoth", "Beam me up, Woolley"). He also changes his first name when using an alias, whereas most people change their last names.
- Lionel Banks, played by Rip Torn. Banks is a bachelor who falls for Karen, under her alias Anastasia Beaverhausen, while Stan is in jail and tempts her into having an affair.
- Malcolm Widmark, played by Alec Baldwin. Malcolm is a government agent who helps Stan fake his death. He has a brief relationship with Karen before she reconciles with Stan, and Malcolm goes on a government mission to Sri Lanka. Malcolm reappears in the final two episodes of season 9, where it is revealed that he and Karen go on a rendezvous trip every year. However, Malcolm is very tired of having to hide from Stan and pressures Karen into deciding between him and Stan. Though she is reluctant to change their situation and despite both of them being tempted to give in to each other, Karen decides to stay with Stan and she and Malcolm share an awkward goodbye. In the beginning of season 10, Malcolm confesses the affair to Stan in hopes of starting a relationship with Karen again, but when Karen finds out about this, she slaps Malcolm and tells him to leave her alone for good. Later in the season, Malcolm reappears at Karen's and Grace's office, hoping to win Karen back, but she is still angry at him and Grace is forced to be a mediator between them. Grace manages to convince Karen to forgive Malcolm and they decide to take things slow. However, when she feels that Malcolm is not putting as much effort into their relationship as she is, she breaks up with him.
- Nikki, played by Samira Wiley. Nikki is a lesbian who works in the office above Grace Adler Designs in season 10. During a snowstorm, Karen confides in Nikki when she feels that Malcolm is not putting as much effort into their relationship as she is, and Nikki tells her she needs someone to take care of her. They then become lovers and Karen begins to question changing her sexuality. Ultimately in the season 10 finale, she announces herself as straight and breaks things off with Nikki, after realizing how lost she has become since her divorce from Stan.

==== Jack ====
- Stuart Lamarack, played by Dave Foley, is a client of Will's who becomes Jack's longest relationship, until Jack cheats on him.
- Drew, played by Ryan Pinkston, is a police officer, Vince's co-worker and Jack's boyfriend for the second half of season 9. Jack meets him at Vince D’Angelo's wedding in “The Wedding”. As Drew is the only cop at the wedding whose favourite show is “This is Us”, Jack concludes he must be gay and sleeps with him. This turns out to be the first gay experience for the formerly straight Drew, who reveals he is married, tells Jack he loves him and then introduces him to his wife Angela. Jack is annoyed at that revelation, but later comes to relish it and he and Drew go at it in the bathroom. In the next episode, Jack and Drew start seeing each other secretly and Jack, nervous about screwing things up too soon, advises a reluctant Drew to hold off on coming out to Angela for the time being. He even supports the alibi of them being just guy friends by having Karen pose as his wife. However, Karen, reminded of her mother's unhappiness in her marriage, outs both Jack and Drew in front of Angela, who is surprisingly supportive and arranges a coming out party for Drew, much to Jack's distress. Jack admits to Drew that he fears missing out on other great men in his life, but when Karen reminds him of his fear of being old and lonely, which is even worse, he decides to give Drew another chance. In “One Job”, after two months of dating, Drew breaks up with Jack, admitting he is not ready for a serious commitment at the moment and wants to see other people. Jack is devastated at the breakup, as he realises that he is now ready to settle down with someone. Drew reappears in the season 10 episode "Conscious Coupling" when he rescues Jack from an elevator stuck in a snowstorm. He admits that he has regretted breaking up with Jack and wants to give their relationship another chance. However, Jack tells Drew that he is engaged and although both are tempted to have a one-night stand in the elevator, Jack refuses to cheat on his fiancé, whom he is now in love with, and tells Drew that they both need to move on.
- Jack has countless short-term lovers over the course of the series (and presumably long before and after the events of the original run), although most are never mentioned by name, or mentioned at all; it is constantly assumed, and not always stated, that he has multiple boyfriends in every episode. Due to Jack's promiscuity, and his habit of forgetting his boyfriends' names, it would be literally impossible to list all of his love interests over the course of the show. Will jokes that if he was to avoid every man that Jack has ever slept with, "that would leave [him] with women." Grace jokes that if everyone stopped working for every man that broke his heart "the city would shut down." Jack also comments that he goes on thousands of dates a year.

=== Other supporting characters ===
- Lorraine Finster, played by Minnie Driver, is Stan's mistress. She is a slutty prison cafeteria worker (and, it is implied, prostitute) and she and Karen dislike one another. She was Karen's stepdaughter for a very brief time when Lyle, her father, marries Karen. Lorraine occasionally calls Karen "mother" to annoy her. It is implied she was estranged from her father for several years and may have been born out of wedlock.
- Harlin Polk, played by Gary Grubbs, is a major client of Will's in season one who ultimately fires Will as his lawyer.
- Mrs. Freeman, played by Jo Marie Payton, is an executive assistant at Doucette & Stein, her most commonly uttered phrase is "Mm-hmm" which she often says with sass.
- Zandra Zoggin, played by Eileen Brennan, is Jack's crusty acting coach and a chain-smoking former Hollywood star. After Jack takes over her class, Zandra loses her interest in life and ends up in an actor's retirement village.
- Dr. Jay Markus, played by Tom Skerritt, is Leo's father and Grace's eventual father-in-law. She meets him during brunch, thinking he is one of Leo's "old friends".
- Eleanor Markus, played by Judith Ivey, is Leo's mother and a noted author of three books on theatre; she meets Grace during brunch alongside her husband. She also is the first to tell her new daughter-in-law her son's actual name, Marvin.
- Mr. Stein, played by Gene Wilder, is the senior partner at Will's firm, an eccentric man who takes a liking to Will. He refers to Will as "Gay Will," but without at first realising that Will is actually gay. He and Karen are attracted to each other, but nothing comes of it. He is away from the office for some time prior to season 5 due to a mental breakdown and subsequent incarceration in a mental facility; having been referred to in the company letter-head as running "The London Office" in his absence.
- Margot, played by Lily Tomlin, is a senior partner at Will's firm, who apparently takes over after Mr. Stein. She is also quite eccentric and sarcastic. She promotes Will to partner.
- Dorleen, played by Parker Posey, is Jack's bitchy, chain-smoking boss during his brief tenure at Barneys New York.
- Mr. Zamir, played by Marshall Manesh, is an obnoxious tenant in Will and Grace's building, with a tendency to take off his shirt and to steal Will and Grace's newspapers.
- Benji, played by Brian A. Setzer, is Beverley Leslie's "business associate" and boytoy.
- Joanne, played by Emily Rutherfurd, is a student of Zandra's acting class who becomes a devoted follower of Jack and his "McFarland method".
- Russell, played by Jon Fleming, is a handsome, muscular student of Zandra's acting class who is often asked by Jack to take his shirt off when Jack is teaching the "McFarland method".
- Julius, played by Neil Vipond, is Bobbi Adler's friend and musical arranger/accompanist.
- Gary, played by Jamie Kaler, is Will's coworker at Doucette and Stein.
- Nurse Sheila, played by Laura Kightlinger, is a rather creepy nurse who works at the sperm bank (where Will visits, intending to donate sperm to his high-school friend Claire). She openly admits she is a whore in season 4 (when Will and Grace are planning to have a baby together), and thereafter seems to appear whenever Will goes into a hospital. She is pregnant in season 8 and attends birth-classes alongside Grace. Her brother, a doctor played by guest-star Jack Black (Kightlinger's real-life former boyfriend), claims he would be "tappin' that big time" if they weren't related.
- Dave, played by Mathew Botuchis, is the only openly straight worker at OutTV, the gay network where Jack works in the last seasons. Jack is unimpressed with his heterosexuality and instead refers to him as Elizabeth.
- Jamie, played by John Ducey, is the station manager and Jack's boss at OutTV.
- Tim, played by Mark Harelik, is a member of senior management at OutTV.
- Jimmy, played by Sam Pancake, is a colleague of Jack's at OutTV.
- Smitty, played by Charles C. Stevenson Jr, is a bartender who regularly serves Karen at different establishments. She has been known to call other bartenders "Smitty", even when they tell her it isn't their name. If Karen is depressed Smitty will tell her a tragic story about his own life, which she will laugh at thinking it is a joke.
- Tony, played by Anthony Ramos, is Grace's assistant

== Guest stars playing one-time characters ==
- Shohreh Aghdashloo, as Pam, an incompetent Iranian hired by Grace who she then fires upon realizing Pam is Jewish and thus she 'doesn't owe (her) anything'.
- Rosanna Arquette, as Julie, a masseuse who lives in the same building as Leo and Grace.
- Orson Bean, as Professor Joseph Dudley, a gay former literature professor of Will and Grace.
- Jason Biggs, as Baby Glenn, a former local celebrity and a guest at Will's auction.
- Roscoe Lee Browne, as Linus, owner of a landmark gay bookstore about to be turned into a gym.
- Jack Black (uncredited), as Dr. Isaac Hershberg. He examines Karen and is also the brother of the occasionally seen nurse Sheila, played by show writer and Black's girlfriend at the time, Laura Kightlinger.
- Richard Chamberlain, as Clyde, an elderly man who Will brings to game night, much to Grace's chagrin
- Glenn Close, as Fannie Lieber (a play on celebrity photographer Annie Leibovitz), a noted photographer who takes Will and Grace's picture.
- Joan Collins, as Helena Barnes, a designer with whom Grace competes for a job, and a nemesis of Karen's.
- Macaulay Culkin, as Jason Towne, a lawyer representing Karen in her divorce from Stan.
- Tim Curry, as Marion Finster, Lyle Finster's brother.
- Matt Damon, as Owen, Jack's heterosexual rival, pretending to be gay to vie for a spot in the Manhattan Gay Men's Chorus.
- Kristin Davis, as Nadine, Vince's straight female friend – the same as Grace is to Will.
- Ellen DeGeneres, as Sister Louise, a nun to whom Will sells Grace's uncle's old car.
- Michael Douglas, as Gavin Hatch, a somewhat closeted gay police detective who becomes attracted to Will and has issues with seeing food stuck in people's teeth.
- Christine Ebersole, as Candy Pruitt, another of Karen's rivals.
- Edie Falco, as Deirdre, one of a pair of lesbian real-estate "flippers".
- Victor Garber, as Peter Bovington, a former actor now working as a doorman.
- Andy García, as Milo, a restaurateur, and lover of Karen's, who fails to phone Karen after their date and is confronted by Grace.
- Sara Gilbert, as Cheryl who, like Will, is a Barry Manilow fanatic, a.k.a. "fanilow".
- Seth Green, as Randall Finn, a former child star.
- Clark Gregg, as Cameron, Jack's wealthy boyfriend who becomes Grace's client.
- Neil Patrick Harris, as Bill, the leader of a group of so-called "former" lesbians and gays.
- Alex Kapp Horner, as Alice Robinson, one of Grace's former classmates.
- Peter Jacobson, as Paul Budnik, an overbearing guy who Will dates but is more fond of his dog.
- Kathryn Joosten, as the owner to a cabin Grace finds money in.
- Stacy Keach, as Wendell Schacter, a former colleague of Jack's who usurps his acting class.
- Piper Laurie, as Sharon Timmers, the best friend of Professor Joseph Dudley.
- Michele Lee, as Lucille, one of the lesbians who ended up dancing with both Will & Jack.
- Hal Linden, as Alan Mills, an elderly gay man who befriends Will and bestows expensive gifts upon him.
- Natasha Lyonne, as Gillian, Grace's intern who decides to turn into the spitting image of Karen.
- Madonna, as Liz, Karen's roommate.
- Lee Majors, as Burt Wolfe, a friend of Grace's father.
- Camryn Manheim, as Psychic Sue.
- Jason Marsden, as Kim, a friend of Leo's.
- Dylan McDermott, as Tom, a boyfriend of Will's who is very closely attached to his elderly mother.
- Michael McDonald, as a Don, a student in a cooking class Will takes and dates his brother.
- Julian McMahon, guy in an elevator who Grace flirts with.
- Demi Moore, as Sissy, Jack's former babysitter.
- Nick Offerman, as a plumber that Karen has sex with on Thanksgiving when Stan asks her to be sexually active while he is still in jail.
- Offerman also appeared in season 9 as Jackson Boudreaux, a celebrity chef who meets Will and Grace at a cooking class, and begins a sexual relationship with both of them.
- Sharon Osbourne, as a bartender in No Sex N' in the City.
- Peter Paige, as a gay Immigration and Naturalization Service officer whom Jack tries to convince his marriage with Rosario is real.
- Scott Patterson, as Grace's former high school crush in "Das Boob".
- Sara Paxton, as Melanie, the head cheerleader at Elliot's school.
- Luke Perry, as Aaron, a "hot gay nerd" bird-watcher on whom Jack develops a crush.
- Jeremy Piven, as Nicholas, Grace's ex. who asks Grace if she wants to join him in a threesome with his current lover.
- Chita Rivera, as Lenore, one of the lesbians who ended up dancing with Will & Jack.
- Brandon Routh, as Sebastian, a stud whom Alan Mills replaces Will with, after the two have a falling out over Will's misinterpretation of their relationship.
- Chloë Sevigny, as Monet, a wealthy bisexual real-estate agent who falls for Will.
- Nicollette Sheridan, as Dr. Danielle Morty, a fellow doctor who wanted Leo sexually.
- Jamie-Lynn Sigler, as Ro, Vince's lesbian sister.
- Britney Spears, as Amber-Louise, a conservative Christian and a "hardcore lesbian" as she describes herself, and a co-host to Jack on his talk show.
- Wendie Jo Sperber, as April, Grace's short-lived housekeeper.
- Sharon Stone, as Georgia Keller, Will and Grace's therapist.
- Larry Sullivan, as Robert, Will's ballet dancing boyfriend on the holiday episode "Jingle Balls".
- Wanda Sykes, as Cricket, a woman Karen offers to pay to deliver a child for her.
- Tamlyn Tomita, as Naomi, half of the couple that takes Will and Grace out all night.
- Rip Torn, as Lionel Banks, a man with whom Karen almost cheats on Stan with during his incarceration.
- Stuart Townsend, as Edward, Karen's pansexual pastry chef, who ends up "sexing" Will, Karen, and Rosario.
- Tracey Ullman, as Anne, the instructor of a couples cooking class that Will, Jack, and Jack's boyfriend Stuart attend.
- Steve Valentine, as Kai, half of the couple who takes Will and Grace out all night.
- Steven Weber, as Will's brother Sam.

== Guest stars playing themselves ==
- Kevin Bacon
- Candice Bergen
- Sandra Bernhard
- Cher
- Katie Couric
- John Edward
- Jennifer Lopez
- Rudy Galindo
- Hall & Oates
- Deborah Harry
- Janet Jackson
- Elton John
- James Earl Jones
- Matt Lauer
- Stone Phillips
- Josh Lucas
- Patti LuPone
- Barry Manilow
- Martina Navratilova
- Bebe Neuwirth
- Al Roker
- George Takei
- Rip Taylor
