= Will & Grace =

American sitcom (1998–2006, 2017–2020)

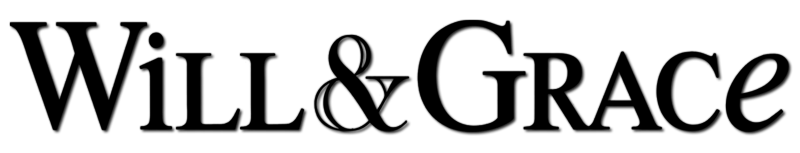
- The intertitle used in the show's 2017 revival
- Genre: Sitcom
- Created by: David Kohan; Max Mutchnick
- Showrunners: David Kohan; Max Mutchnick
- Directed by: James Burrows
- Starring: Eric McCormack; Debra Messing; Megan Mullally; Sean Hayes; Gary Grubbs; Leslie Jordan; Shelley Morrison; Michael Angarano
- Theme music composer: Jonathan Wolff
- Composers: Jonathan Wolff (seasons 1–7); Jonathan Wolff & Paul Buckley (season 8); Scott Icenogle & Lior Rosner (seasons 9–11)
- Country of origin: United States
- Original language: English
- No. of seasons: 11
- No. of episodes: 246 (list of episodes)

Production
- Executive producers: Max Mutchnick; David Kohan; James Burrows; Jhoni Marchinko; Jeff Greenstein; Alex Herschlag; Dave Flebotte; Jon Kinnally; Tracy Poust; Gary Janetti; Greg Malins; Bill Wrubel; John Quaintance; Suzanne Martin; Adam Barr
- Cinematography: Tony Askins; Gary Baum
- Editors: Peter Chakos; Peter D. Beyt
- Camera setup: Multi-camera
- Running time: 22 minutes
- Production companies: KoMut Entertainment; 3 Sisters Entertainment (1998–2006); 3 Princesses and a P Productions (2017–2020); Universal Television (Note: Credited as NBC Studios from 1998 to 2004; as NBCUniversal Television Studio from 2004 to 2006)

Original release
- Network: NBC
- Release: September 21, 1998 – May 18, 2006
- Release: September 28, 2017 – April 23, 2020

Will & Grace is an American television sitcom created by Max Mutchnick and David Kohan. Set in New York City, the show focuses on the friendship between best friends Will Truman (Eric McCormack), a gay lawyer, and Grace Adler (Debra Messing), a straight interior designer. The show was originally broadcast on NBC from September 21, 1998, to May 18, 2006, for a total of eight seasons, before returning to NBC on September 28, 2017, and permanently ending on April 23, 2020. Will & Grace has been one of the most successful television series with gay principal characters.

Despite initial criticism for its stereotypical portrayal of gay characters, the show went on to become a staple of NBC's Must See TV Thursday night lineup and was met with continued critical acclaim. It was ensconced in the Nielsen top 20 for half of its 1998–2006 network run. The show was the highest-rated sitcom among adults 18–49 from 2001 to 2005. Will & Grace earned 18 Primetime Emmy Awards and 96 nominations. Each main actor received an Emmy Award throughout the series. In 2014, the Writers Guild of America placed the sitcom at number 94 in their list of the 101 best-written TV series of all time.

Since the final episode of the 1998–2006 run aired, the sitcom has been credited with helping and improving public opinion of the LGBT community, with then U.S. Vice President Joe Biden commenting that the show "probably did more to educate the American public" on LGBT issues "than almost anything anybody has ever done so far". In 2014, the Smithsonian Institution added an LGBT history collection to their museum which included items from Will & Grace. Curator Dwight Blocker Bowers stated that the sitcom used "comedy to familiarize a mainstream audience with gay culture" in a way that was "daring and broke ground" in American media.

During its original run, Will & Grace was filmed in front of a live studio audience (most episodes and scenes) on Tuesday nights, at Stage 17 in CBS Studio Center. A long-running legal battle between both the original executive producers and creators and NBC took place between 2003 and 2007. Will and Grace's apartment was put on display at the Emerson College Library, donated by series creator Max Mutchnick. When the set was removed in 2014, rumors came up about a cast reunion, but the actors involved denied that such a reunion was planned, explaining it was merely being moved.

In September 2016, the cast reunited for a 10-minute special (released online), urging Americans to vote in the 2016 presidential election. After its success, NBC announced that the network was exploring the idea of putting Will & Grace back into production. In January 2017, NBC confirmed the series' return for a ninth season, for the 2017–2018 television season, which was eventually expanded to 16 episodes. This was followed by renewals for 18-episode tenth and eleventh seasons. On July 25, 2019, it was announced that the eleventh season would be the final season of the series which premiered on October 24, 2019, and concluded on April 23, 2020.

== Premise ==
Will & Grace is set in New York City and focuses on the relationship between Will Truman, a gay lawyer, and his best friend Grace Adler, a Jewish woman who owns an interior design firm. Alongside them are their friends Karen Walker, a demonically alcoholic socialite, and Jack McFarland, a gay actor. The interplay of relationships features the trials and tribulations of dating, marriage, divorce, and casual sex; as well as comical key stereotypes of gay and Jewish culture.

== Cast and characters ==
=== Main ===
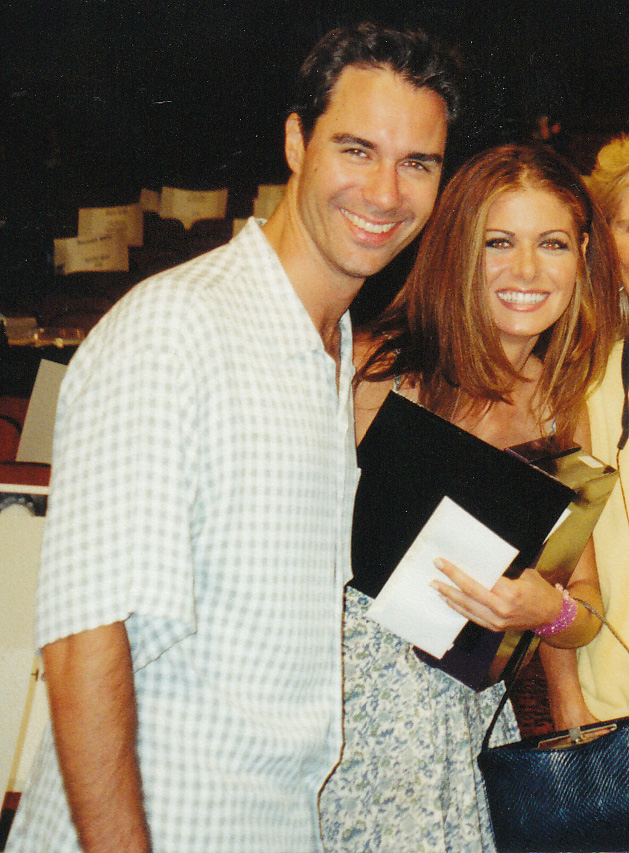
Eric McCormack and Debra Messing in 1999

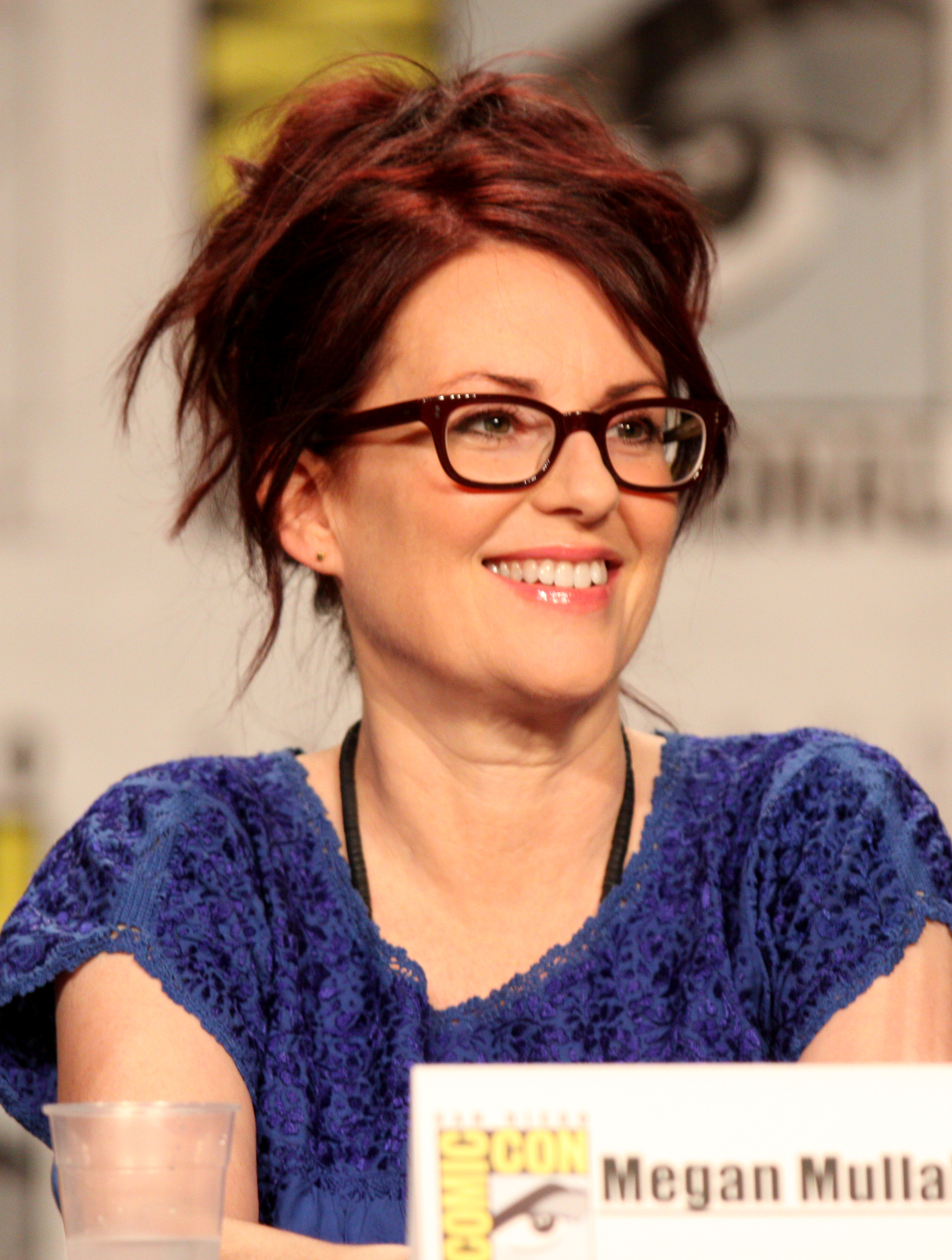
Mullally in 2011

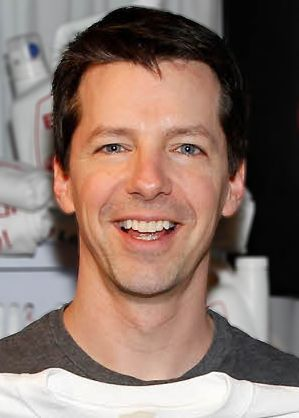
Hayes in 2010

- Eric McCormack as Will Truman: The male titular protagonist in the show, Will is a gay man who is a successful corporate lawyer who studied at Columbia University, where he met Grace as a freshman; they have been best friends ever since. He is very precise and obsessive when it comes to certain tasks, especially cleaning, dressing, and decorating. However, Will does have a very patient and compassionate nature towards those close to him, often to a fault. Will has a less expressive personality than Jack and has at times chosen not to announce his sexual orientation to people. Several characters commented that his relationship with Grace is more like that of a married couple than two friends; at one point Will even considered having a baby with Grace.
- Debra Messing as Grace Adler: The female titular protagonist in the show, Grace is a straight interior decorator with a fondness for food and a sometimes selfish attitude. She has been Will's best friend since college and roommate throughout most of the show. Grace is Jewish but does not practice her religion staunchly. She plays as a neurotic foil for Will's more everyman character. Grace tends to rely heavily on Will for moral and emotional support, especially after a break-up.
- Megan Mullally as Karen Walker: Karen "works" as Grace's assistant, making "Grace Adler Designs" popular among her socialite acquaintances. She is married to the wealthy (but unseen) Stanley Walker. Because of her husband's wealth, Karen does not actually need a job and it is shown in the pilot episode that she had not been cashing her paychecks, preferring to "collect" them instead. She mentions at one point that she only took the job to get herself "away from Stan and the kids". Karen is also known for casually downing alcohol and prescription medication, as well as her venomous personality. She is very close to Jack, secretly adores Grace, and throughout the show's run, warms up to Will. Even though she seems to be devoid of manners and social graces, Karen inconsistently shows bouts of intelligence: having a working knowledge of business/real estate market economics, a moderate understanding of computers, and a flair for interior design. She is also a certified public notary and an aficionado of various liquors and prescription drugs. Despite this, she is often unaware of her rudeness and thoughtless conduct toward the working and middle classes, often criticizing and mocking what she fails to understand.
- Sean Hayes as Jack McFarland: Will's close friend since college. Jack is flamboyant, gay, confident, and free-spirited, having been so from a young age. He drifts from man to man and changes occupations often, being very fickle when it comes to both. He has worked as a struggling actor, an acting instructor, a back-up dancer for Jennifer Lopez and Janet Jackson, a sales associate at Banana Republic and Barneys New York, a cater-waiter, a student nurse, Junior VP for Out TV, and host of his own Out TV talk show, called Jack Talk. Jack made four one-man shows (called Just Jack, Jack 2000, Jack 2001, and Jack 2002) to showcase his singing/dancing/acting abilities; all attempts having only marginal success. Early on in the show he establishes a close friendship with Karen; the pair often spend time together and orchestrate various pranks. Throughout the series, Jack relies on Will and Karen for financial support, but in the finale of the original series, he inherits Beverley Leslie's money and becomes very rich. He idolizes Cher.
- Gary Grubbs as Harlin Polk (regular season 1; guest season 2): A major client of Will's in season one who ultimately fires him.
- Shelley Morrison as Rosario Salazar (regular seasons 3–8; recurring seasons 1–2): Karen's maid, and later Jack's wife then ex-wife because of a green card marriage. Morrison was invited to reprise her role when the series was revived, but declined, having retired from acting.
- Michael Angarano as Elliot (regular season 4; recurring seasons 3, 5–6, 8; special guest season 9): Jack's son. Shortly after learning of his biological father's death, Jack meets Elliot, his biological son created from sperm Jack donated at the age of 17.

=== Supporting ===
Supporting characters on Will & Grace
Main characters	Will Truman	Grace Adler	Jack McFarland	Karen Walker
Spouses	Vince D'Angelo (Bobby Cannavale); McCoy Whitman (Matt Bomer)	Marvin "Leo" Markus (Harry Connick Jr.)	Rosario Salazar (Shelley Morrison); Estéfan Gloria (Brian Jordan Alvarez)	Stanley Walker (unseen character); Lyle Finster (John Cleese)
Family	George Truman (Sydney Pollack); Marilyn Truman (Blythe Danner); Sam Truman (John Slattery / Steven Weber); Paul Truman (Jon Tenney)	Bobbi Adler (Debbie Reynolds); Martin Adler (Alan Arkin/Robert Klein); Janet Adler (Geena Davis/Mary McCormack); Joyce Adler (Sara Rue); Fiona Adler (Billie Lourd); Eleanor Markus (Judith Ivey)	Judith McFarland (Veronica Cartwright); Elliot (Michael Angarano); Daniel McFarland (Beau Bridges); Skip (Jet Jurgensmeyer)	Lois Whitley (Suzanne Pleshette); Gin (Bernadette Peters); Barry (Dan Futterman); Lorraine Finster (Minnie Driver); Marion Finster (Tim Curry); Sumner Davis (Paul Satterfield)
Family	Ben Truman (Ben Newmark), Lila Markus (Maria Thayer)		Judith McFarland (Veronica Cartwright); Elliot (Michael Angarano); Daniel McFarland (Beau Bridges); Skip (Jet Jurgensmeyer)	Lois Whitley (Suzanne Pleshette); Gin (Bernadette Peters); Barry (Dan Futterman); Lorraine Finster (Minnie Driver); Marion Finster (Tim Curry); Sumner Davis (Paul Satterfield)
Friends	Karen Walker (Megan Mullally), Jack McFarland (Sean Hayes), Rob (Tom Gallop), Ellen (Leigh-Allyn Baker), Joe (Jerry Levine), Larry (Tim Bagley), Steve (Steve Paymer)		Will Truman (Eric McCormack), Grace Adler (Debra Messing), Karen Walker (Megan Mullally), Zandra Zoggin (Eileen Brennan)	Will Truman (Eric McCormack), Grace Adler (Debra Messing), Jack McFarland (Sean Hayes), Candice Bergen (Candice Bergen), Smitty (Charles C. Stevenson Jr.)
Neighbors	Val Bassett (Molly Shannon), Mr. Zamir (Marshall Manesh), Nathan (Woody Harrelson), Mrs. Timmer (Livia Treviño)			—N/a
Love interests	Michael (Chris Potter); Scott Sender (Branden Brent Williams); Matthew (Patrick Dempsey); James Hanson (Taye Diggs); Vince D'Angelo (Bobby Cannavale); McCoy Whitman (Matt Bomer)	Ben Doucette (Gregory Hines); Danny (Tom Verica); Josh (Corey Parker); Nathan (Woody Harrelson); Nick (Edward Burns); Tom Cassidy (Eric Stoltz); Marvin "Leo" Markus (Harry Connick Jr.); Noah Broader (David Schwimmer)	Stuart Lamarack (Dave Foley); Kevin Bacon (Kevin Bacon)	Lionel Banks (Rip Torn); Malcolm Widmark (Alec Baldwin); Nikki (Samira Wiley)
Rivals	Kevin Wolchek (Adam Goldberg)	Val Bassett (Molly Shannon)	Artemis Johnson (Will Arnett); Owen (Matt Damon); Jimmy (Sam Pancake)	Helena Barnes (Joan Collins); Beverley Leslie (Leslie Jordan); Lorraine Finster (Minnie Driver); Scott Woolley (Jeff Goldblum); Candy Pruitt (Christine Ebersole); Val Bassett (Molly Shannon); Candice Bergen (Candice Bergen)
Bosses	Ben Doucette (Gregory Hines); Mr. Stein (Gene Wilder); Margot (Lily Tomlin); Malcolm Widmark (Alec Baldwin)	—N/a	Jamie (John Ducey); Tim (Mark Harelik); Dorleen (Parker Posey)	Grace Adler (Debra Messing)
Employees / Subordinates	Mrs. Freeman (Jo Marie Payton); Connie (Kari Lizer)	Karen Walker (Megan Mullally); Gillian (Natasha Lyonne); Tony (Anthony Ramos)	Dave (Mathew Botuchis)	Rosario Salazar (Shelley Morrison); Friday (Vanessa Bayer)
Clients	Harlin Polk (Gary Grubbs); Stanley Walker	—N/a	Joanne (Emily Rutherfurd); Russell (Jon Fleming)	—N/a
Co-workers	Gary (Jamie Kaler)	—N/a	—N/a	—N/a
Others	Tina (Lesley Ann Warren), Benji (Brian A. Setzer), Nurse Sheila (Laura Kightlinger), Diedre (Edie Falco), Monet (Chloë Sevigny), Cher (Cher), Jenny (Demi Lovato)			

== Episodes ==
Season	Episodes	Originally released		Rank	Rating	Viewers (millions)
Season	Episodes	First released	Last released	Rank	Rating	Viewers (millions)
1	22	September 21, 1998	May 13, 1999	40	—N/a	12.72
2	24	September 21, 1999	May 23, 2000	44	—N/a	12.96
3	25	October 12, 2000	May 17, 2001	14	11.3	18.66
4	27	September 27, 2001	May 16, 2002	9	11.0	18.43
5	24	September 26, 2002	May 15, 2003	11	11.0	18.34
6	24	September 25, 2003	April 29, 2004	13	10.4	15.79
7	24	September 16, 2004	May 19, 2005	44	—N/a	10.41
8	24	September 29, 2005	May 18, 2006	61	—N/a	9.08
Webisode	1	September 23, 2016		—N/a	—N/a	—N/a
9	16	September 28, 2017	April 5, 2018	36	—N/a	8.85
10	18	October 4, 2018	April 4, 2019	72	—N/a	5.31
11	18	October 24, 2019	April 23, 2020	82	—N/a	4.01
Special		April 23, 2020		—N/a	—N/a	2.97

== Production ==
=== Conception ===
Creators of Will & Grace and real-life friends Max Mutchnick and David Kohan modeled the show after Mutchnick's relationship with childhood friend Janet Eisenberg, a New York City voice-over casting agent. Mutchnick, who is gay, met Eisenberg while rehearsing a play at Temple Emanuel in Beverly Hills, California, when aged 13. He was the main star of the Hebrew school musical, while she was a student in the drama department. About three years later, she introduced him to Kohan, the son of comedy writer Alan Kohan, in the drama department at Beverly Hills High School. "Max and Janet seemed to have a lovely rapport, but the romantic element confused me, and it confused them as well", Kohan later recalled. "They went out for a couple of years, then they went off to different colleges. And Max comes out of the closet, springs it on her—and she was stunned. It was a shocking revelation for her, so I kind of functioned as a liaison between the two of them, because they both still really loved each other."

While Kohan practiced his shuttle diplomacy, he and Mutchnick began developing sitcom ideas, which prompted the pair to start writing as a duo. They eventually landed staff jobs on HBO's adult-themed sitcom Dream On and executive produced the NBC sitcom Boston Common. In 1997, they developed an ensemble comedy about six friends, two of them based on Mutchnick and Eisenberg. At the same time, Warren Littlefield, the then-president of NBC Entertainment, was seeking another relationship comedy for the network as Mad About You was going off the air. When Kohan and Mutchnick pitched their idea, which centered on three couples, one of which was a gay man living with a straight woman, Littlefield was not excited about the first two couples, but wanted to learn more about the gay and straight couple, so Mutchnick and Kohan were sent to create a pilot script centering on those two characters. While Kohan and Mutchnick elaborated on the pilot script, they spent four tense months faxing Littlefield the box office grosses from hit films with gay characters such as The Birdcage and My Best Friend's Wedding.

NBC was positive about the project, but there was still some concern that the homosexual subject matter would cause alarm. Ellen DeGeneres's sitcom Ellen, which aired on ABC, was canceled the year before Will & Grace premiered because ratings had plummeted after the show became "too gay." Despite the criticism ABC received for DeGeneres's coming out episode, "The Puppy Episode", Kohan said, "there's no question that show made it easier for Will & Grace to make it on the air." He added: "Will & Grace had a better shot at succeeding where Ellen failed, however, because Will has known about his homosexuality for 20 years. He's not exploring that awkward territory for the first time, as Ellen did. The process of self-discovery and the pain most gay men go through is fascinating, but the average American is put off by it."

=== Pilot ===
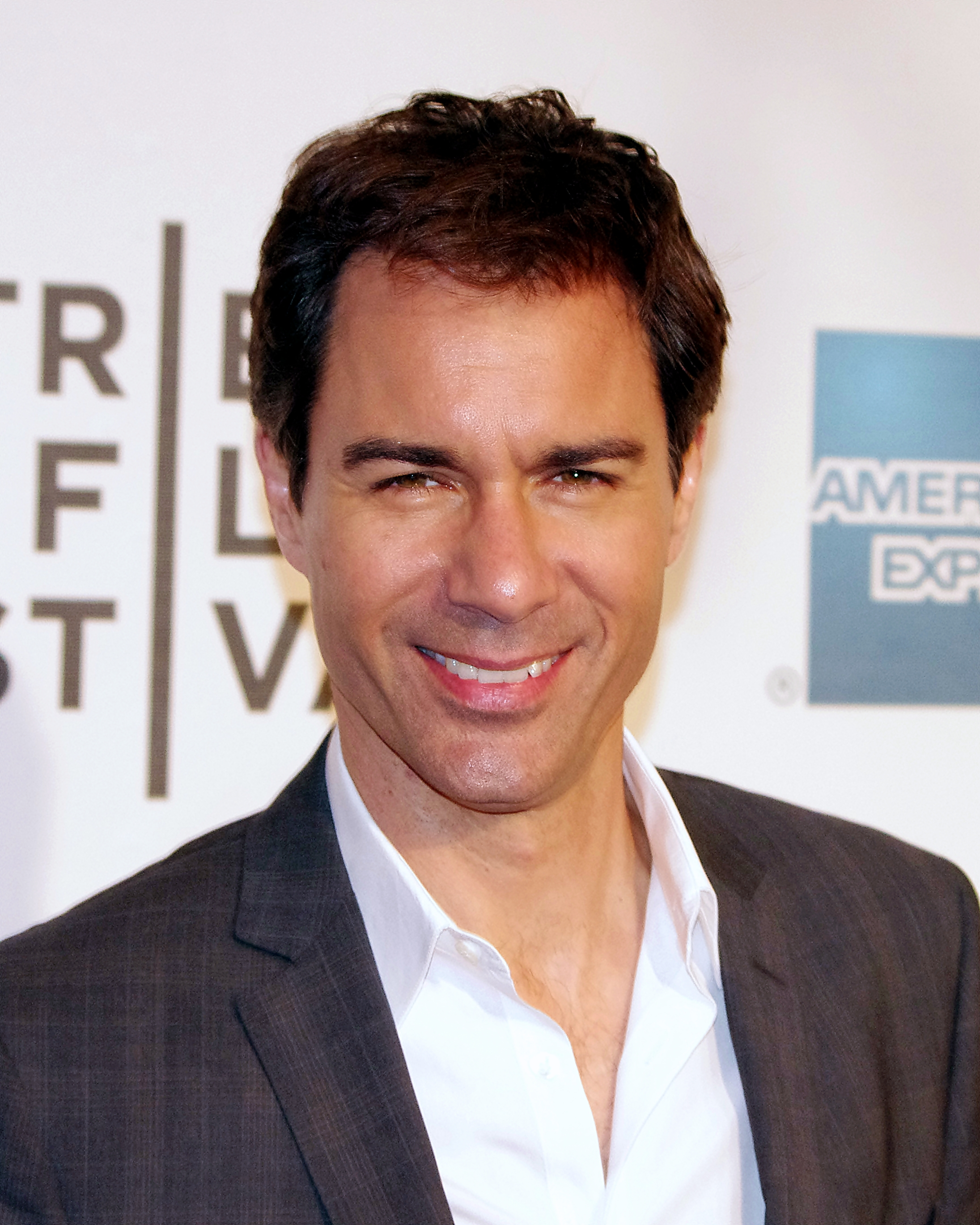
Eric McCormack was the first actor cast in the series

NBC went to sitcom director James Burrows to see what he thought of the homosexual subject matter and if an audience would be interested in the show. Burrows liked the idea and when he first read the script in November 1997, he decided that he wanted to direct it. Burrows said, "I knew that the boys had captured a genre and a group of characters I have never read before." The filming of the pilot began on March 15, 1998. The actors behind Will and Grace, Eric McCormack and Debra Messing, were positive about the series and they thought it had the potential to last long on television. McCormack said: "When shooting was finished that night, Debra and I were sitting on the couch and looking at each other and I said, 'We're gonna be on this set for a while.' And we sort of clasped hands, but we didn't want to say anything beyond that and jinx it."

The part of Will Truman went to Eric McCormack, who was the first actor cast in the series. Having played gay characters several times in his career, McCormack did not have a problem with it and thought his character could become a "poster boy for some gay movement", in the way that DeGeneres became a spokesperson with her character. Sean Hayes was invited to audition for Jack after an NBC casting executive saw him in a role in the indie gay romance film Billy's Hollywood Screen Kiss. Even though Hayes enjoyed the script when he read it, he threw it away and decided not to try out for the audition until he was sent the script again. Megan Mullally initially auditioned for the role of Grace Adler, but admitted that she did not want to audition for the part of Karen since it seemed too similar to Christine Baranski’s part on Cybill. Once Mullally got the role, she was able to put her own spin on the character and add some fun quirks to Karen. By contrast, Debra Messing, with whom Mullally had first worked on Ned and Stacey, was initially unsure if she wanted to play the role of Grace. The last actor to be cast, she later admitted that director Burrows was the reason for doing Will & Grace. The production team once admitted that they got her to finally say yes once she was drunk at a party.

=== Revival ===
In January 2017, NBC closed a deal for a new 10-episode season of the series, which aired during the 2017–18 season. Hayes executive produced this season as well as creators/executive producers Max Mutchnick and David Kohan. Veteran director James Burrows is on board to direct and executive produce. In April 2017, the episode order was increased to 12 episodes. In August 2017, it was extended again to 16 episodes, and a 13-episode tenth season was ordered. The revival was filmed at Stage 22 at Universal Studios Hollywood, as opposed to Stage 17 at CBS Studio Center. In March 2018, NBC ordered five more episodes for the revival's second season, bringing the total to 18 episodes, and it was also renewed for an 18-episode third (eleventh) and final season.

== Aftershow ==
=== Will & Grace: After Party ===
Logo for the aftershow

With the release of the ninth season of the series, NBC also released Will & Grace: After Party, an aftershow hosted by Kristin dos Santos. The guests of the aftershow are composed of cast and crew from the series, including David Kohan, Max Mutchnick, and the series' stars, to discuss the development and behind-the-scenes production of the series. The series premiered on NBC.com on September 29, 2017.

No.	Title	Episode discussed	Guest(s)	Original release date
1	"Episode 1"	11 Years Later	Eric McCormack	September 29, 2017
2	"Episode 2"	Who's Your Daddy	Harry Connick Jr. and Bobby Cannavale	October 6, 2017
3	"Episode 3"	Emergency Contact	Jane Lynch and Glenda Rovello	October 12, 2017
4	"Episode 4"	Grandpa Jack	Minnie Driver	October 19, 2017
5	"Episode 5"	How to Succeed in Business Without Really Crying	Leslie Jordan	October 26, 2017
6	"Episode 6"	Rosario's Quinceañera	Megan Mullally, David Kohan, and Max Mutchnick	November 2, 2017

== Legal issues ==
In December 2003, in the midst of the series' sixth season, executive producers and creators David Kohan and Max Mutchnick sued NBC and NBC Studios. Alleging that the network sold the rights to the series in an attempt to keep profits within the NBC family, Kohan and Mutchnick felt that they were cheated out of considerable profits because the network did not shop the show to the highest bidder. Another allegation against the network was that during the first four seasons of the series, the studio licensed the rights for amounts that were insufficient for covering production costs, thus leading to extraordinarily large production deficits. Three months later, NBC filed a countersuit against Kohan and Mutchnick stating that the co-creators were expected to act as an independent third party in the negotiations between NBC and its subsidiary, NBC Studios (since subsumed into Universal Television).

With a pending lawsuit and production beginning on other projects, Kohan and Mutchnick were absent on the Will & Grace set for most of its final seasons. They wrote the season 4 episode, "A Buncha White Chicks Sittin' Around Talkin'" and did not return to the writers' seat until the series finale four years later. Three years after NBC's countersuit and one year after the series ended, the legal battle between NBC and Kohan and Mutchnick ended in 2007 when all parties agreed on a settlement, with the series creators being awarded $49 million of the $65 million they sued for.

== Syndication ==
Will & Grace entered off-network syndication in 2002, and remained in local syndication until 2008. In 2002 WGN America acquired the cable rights to air the series, where it aired until 2005 when Lifetime Television acquired the cable rights to the series. After eight years and the expiration of Lifetime's contract, the rights to the series were picked up by WeTV and Logo TV in 2013, with both eventually letting the rights lapse.

The streaming service Hulu later picked up the show, in anticipation of the show's revival in 2017, with the entire series also carried on NBC.com. Around the same time, NBC's classic subchannel network Cozi TV picked up the series and airs it four times nightly, and promotes it as "The Original Series" to avert confusion with the current-day run.

In the United Kingdom, the series was broadcast on Channel 4 up until its season finale in 2006. The revival of the show was picked up by Channel 5 instead, premiering in January 2018. The channel chose not to broadcast any further episodes, and the tenth (and eleventh) seasons went straight to a DVD release in August 2019 and July 2020 respectively, before Comedy Central – a sister channel – began the tenth season in January 2021.

In Ireland, the series first aired on TV3 Ireland until its conclusion in 2006. It was confirmed in January 2018 rival channel RTÉ2 picked up the broadcasting rights for the 2017–18 season run, beginning in February 2018.

== Reception ==
=== Critical response ===
The show garnered a fair amount of criticism and negative reviews upon its debut in 1998, most of which compared the show to the recently canceled ABC sitcom Ellen. One such review said, "If Will & Grace can somehow survive a brutal time period opposite football and Ally McBeal, it could grow into a reasonably entertaining little anomaly—that is, a series about a man and a woman who have no sexual interest in one another. But don't bet on it. If it's doomed relationships viewers want, they'll probably opt for Ally." As popular as the show came to be, particularly among gay viewers, Will & Grace continuously dealt with criticism for having a limited view of the gay community and for reinforcing stereotypes when some felt it should have torn them down.

The ninth season was met with generally positive reviews. On Rotten Tomatoes, the season has a rating of 86% based on 37 reviews, with an average rating of 7.3/10. The site's critical consensus reads, "Will & Grace reunites its ever-hilarious cast for a revival season that picks up right where the show left off 11 years ago—adding a fresh relevance and a series of stories that make sharply funny use of the passage of time." On Metacritic, the season has a weighted average score of 73 out of 100, based on 26 critics, indicating "generally favorable reviews".

The series finale was heavily promoted by NBC, and McCormack, Messing, Mullally and Hayes appeared on The Oprah Winfrey Show and The Today Show to bid farewell, on May 10 and 18, respectively. NBC devoted a two-hour block in its primetime schedule on May 18, 2006, for the Will & Grace send-off. An hour-long series retrospective, "Say Goodnight, Gracie", featuring interviews with the cast, crew, and guest stars, preceded the hour-long series finale. Series creators and executive producers Kohan and Mutchnick, who had not served as writers since the season 4 finale, penned the script for "The Finale". Regarding the finale, Mutchnick stated, "We wrote about what you want to have happen with people you love... All the things that matter in life, they end up having."

The show has been criticized for not fully challenging stereotypes. "Battles and Hilton-Morrow (2002) analyse Will & Grace with regard to its dependence on traditional sitcom formulas and argue that the narratives diminish any of the show's potentially subversive themes...Kanner (2003) notes that the gayness of Will & Grace is normalized because the driving force of the show is their heterosexual friendship. Will's sexuality is assumed and incorporated into the show mostly as comic source and rarely as driving narrative."

== Awards and nominations ==
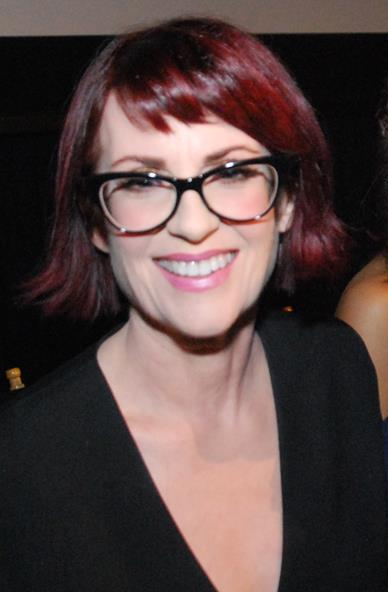
Megan Mullally received two Primetime Emmy Awards for her portrayal of Karen

Will & Grace has been nominated for 83 Primetime Emmy Awards, winning 18 of them, including once for Outstanding Comedy Series in 2000. McCormack, Messing, Hayes, and Mullally each won at least one Emmy Award for their respective performances, becoming one of four live-action sitcoms, along with All in the Family, The Golden Girls and Schitt's Creek, where all the principal actors have won at least one Emmy Award. Mullally also won a second time for her performance in 2006, a year when Will & Grace was nominated for 10 Emmys for its final season. The year before, the show had garnered 15 nominations, tied with Desperate Housewives as the series receiving the most nominations. This was almost an all-time record; the two shows were second behind The Larry Sanders Show, with 16 nominations in 1996.

With three each, both Hayes and Mullally held the record of winning the most Screen Actors Guild Awards for the categories Best Performance by an Actor in a Comedy Series and Best Performance by an Actress in a Comedy Series, respectively, for their roles in Will & Grace; however, Tina Fey went on to tie with Mullally and Alec Baldwin went on to surpass Hayes, both for their roles on the series 30 Rock. Will & Grace has won several GLAAD Media Awards for its advocacy of the gay community. Despite 30 total nominations, Will & Grace never won a Golden Globe Award.

== Ratings ==
The show debuted on Mondays beginning on September 21, 1998, and steadily gained in popularity, culminating when it moved to Thursday night as part of NBC's Must See TV line-up. The show ultimately became a highly rated television show in the United States, earning a top-twenty rating during four of its eight seasons, including one season at No. 9. From 2001 to 2005, Will & Grace was the highest-rated sitcom among adults aged 18–49. However, when the show lost Friends as its lead-in after the 2003–04 season, Will & Grace began shedding viewers and slipped out of the top 20 during its last two seasons.

"The Finale" drew over 18 million viewers, ranking No. 8 for the week, easily making it the most watched episode of seasons seven & eight. While the season eight finale is considered a ratings success, it is far from being the most watched episode of Will & Grace—that accolade remains with the season four episode "A Chorus Lie", which aired on February 7, 2002, and ranked No. 8 for the week. When the show was at the height of its popularity (seasons 3–5), ranking in the Top 10 was a common occurrence, but the finale's Top 10 rank was the only such rank for season 8 and the first such rank since the season 7 premiere "FYI: I Hurt, Too". Although it had slipped down the overall rankings, Will & Grace ended its final, eleventh season as NBC's most watched comedy series.

=== Average seasonal ratings ===
Viewership and ratings per season of Will & Grace
Season	Timeslot (ET)	Episodes	First aired		Last aired		TV season	Viewership rank	Avg. viewers (millions)
Season	Timeslot (ET)	Episodes	Date	Viewers (millions)	Date	Viewers (millions)	TV season	Viewership rank	Avg. viewers (millions)
1	Monday 9:30 pm (1–8); Tuesday 9:30 pm (9–17); Thursday 8:30 pm (18–22)	22	September 21, 1998	11.82	May 13, 1999	18.14	1998–99	40	12.72
2	Tuesday 9:00 pm	24	September 21, 1999	16.09	May 23, 2000	15.52	1999–2000	44	12.96
3	Thursday 9:00 pm	25	October 12, 2000	24.32	May 17, 2001	20.50	2000–01	14	18.66
4	Thursday 9:00 pm	27	September 27, 2001	20.64	May 16, 2002	23.65	2001–02	9	18.43
5	Thursday 9:00 pm	24	September 26, 2002	21.45	May 15, 2003	20.28	2002–03	11	18.34
6	Thursday 9:00 pm (1–12, 22–24); Thursday 8:30 pm (13–21)	24	September 25, 2003	20.29	April 29, 2004	20.53	2003–04	16	15.79
7	Thursday 8:30 pm	24	September 16, 2004	16.55	May 19, 2005	7.92	2004–05	44	10.41
8	Thursday 8:30 pm (1–9); Thursday 8:00 pm (10–24)	24	September 29, 2005	9.81	May 18, 2006	18.43	2005–06	61	9.08
9	Thursday 9:00 pm	16	September 28, 2017	10.19	April 5, 2018	3.63	2017–18	36	8.85
10	Thursday 9:00 pm (1–8, 17–18); Thursday 9:30 pm (9–16)	18	October 4, 2018	3.96	April 4, 2019	2.99	2018–19	72	5.31
11	Thursday 9:30 pm (1–5); Thursday 9:00 pm (6–18)	18	October 24, 2019	2.28	April 23, 2020	3.14	2019–20	82	4.01

=== Cultural impact ===
The series was the first prime-time television series on American television to star openly gay lead characters, making it the highest-profile presence of LGBT characters on American broadcast television since Ellen's eponymous lead character's coming-out in the 1997 "Puppy Episode". It has also been heralded as responsible for opening the door to a string of gay-themed television programs, such as Queer as Folk, Queer Eye for the Straight Guy, and Boy Meets Boy. In 2004, the cast of the show were listed in Bravo's 100 Greatest TV Characters. In 2012, The Washington Post ranked Will & Grace the ninth-best NBC comedy of all time. In 2014, scripts, props, and set decor from Will & Grace were donated to the National Museum of American History, which is part of the Smithsonian. In December 2023, Variety ranked Will & Grace #93 on its list of the 100 greatest TV shows of all time.

In May 2012, during a Meet the Press interview with host David Gregory, then U.S. Vice President Joe Biden cited the series as an influence in American thinking regarding LGBT rights, saying, "I think Will & Grace did more to educate the American public than almost anything anybody has ever done. People fear that which is different. Now they're beginning to understand." In the same interview, Biden stated that he was "absolutely comfortable" with same-sex marriage, a statement which was followed on May 9 by President Barack Obama's speaking in favor of it. The day after Obama's statement, series co-creator Mutchnick later told CBS This Morning that Biden had spoken similar words at a private function which Mutchnick and his husband had attended two weeks prior to Biden's statement, although a White House official was cited by CBS This Morning's Bill Plante as asserting that the Meet the Press interview was not a "trial balloon" for the statement. Both Mutchnick and Kohan praised Biden's statement, but were critical of Obama's stance on marriage during the time between Biden's and Obama's statements.

== Home media ==
Lions Gate Home Entertainment and NBC Enterprises has released all eight seasons of Will & Grace on DVD in Region 1, 2, and 4. The show was re-released and re-packaged on October 3, 2011, on region 2. Universal Studios Home Entertainment currently holds the rights to the series in Region 1. On August 29, 2017, Universal re-released season 1 of the series on DVD in a 3-disc set. The re-release carries over all bonus features from the original Lionsgate release. It is unknown whether or not Universal will re-release the rest of the series. On June 12, 2018, Universal released season 9 on DVD and made-on-demand Blu-Ray, as Will & Grace: The Revival – Season One in region 1. Season 10 was released as Will & Grace: The Revival – Season Two on DVD and made-on-demand Blu-Ray on June 18, 2019. Finally, on July 7, 2020, Season 11 was released as Will & Grace: The Revival – Season Three: The Farewell Season on DVD only.

Season	Ep#	Discs	Release dates			Notes
Season	Ep#	Discs	1	2	4	Notes
1	22	4	August 12, 2003	August 30, 2004	2004	Reissued on August 29, 2017, by Universal; 22 uncut episodes
2	24	4	March 23, 2004	August 30, 2004	2004	Syndicated (edited) version "Ben? Her?" appears. However, the full version appears on the complete boxed set and the compilation "Will & Grace: Best of Love & Marriage."; Episode listing on box does not match episode listing on discs; Episodes on the fourth disc appear out of sequence
3	25	4	September 7, 2004	August 30, 2004	2005	"Gypsies, Tramps and Weed" appears as its syndicated version.; The "super-size" episode, "Cheaters", appears as the original version, without the extra footage later added for syndication; "Cheaters" is incorrectly labeled as "Cheaters, part 1"; Various international Season 3 sets feature the syndicated versions of "Cheaters" (in two parts), with the extra footage included.
4	27	4	August 16, 2005	August 30, 2004	2005	27 uncut episodes
5	24	4	August 29, 2006	March 7, 2005	2006	The "super-size" episodes, "Women and Children First", "Dolls and Dolls", "May Divorce Be with You", "23", and the season finale "24", appear as the syndicated versions
6	24	4	May 1, 2007	August 15, 2005	2007	The "super-size" episodes, "Dames at Sea", "A-Story, Bee-Story" and "Ice Cream Balls", appear as the syndicated versions.; Although not a "super-size" episode, "Strangers with Candace" is edited to its syndicated version.; The one-hour season finale, "I Do, Oh, No, You Di-in't," is split into two episodes (Parts 1 & 2). However, there is no footage missing.
7	24	4	December 4, 2007	January 30, 2006	2007	The episode "Friends with Benefits" is presented in its syndicated cut version. The original version can be found on the 2007 Emmy-consideration promotional DVD.; The bloopers in the United States have been censored/cut, with approx. 1 minute of footage removed compared to the international editions.; All episodes after "Christmas Break" originally aired in widescreen, but are presented in 4x3 here.
8	24	4	September 16, 2008	August 7, 2006	2008	All 24 episodes included in their entirety.; As with the later half of season 7, all episodes in this season originally aired in widescreen, and are presented in 4x3 here.
Finale	1	1	May 30, 2006	—	—	One-hour series finale included in its entirety.
9	16	2	June 12, 2018	TBA	June 13, 2018	
10	18	2	June 18, 2019	TBA	June 18, 2019	
11	18	2	July 7, 2020	TBA	July 7, 2020	
1–8	194	33	September 16, 2008	August 7, 2006	April 30, 2008	Re-packaged discs from the previous releases with a bonus disc containing: A re-hashing of season 8's themed featurettes; Eric's favorite episode with commentary by him and Debra Messing; Debra's favorite episode with commentary by her and Eric McCormack; The Pilot Episode with commentary by Max Mutchinck, David Kohan, and James Burrows; A slideshow of stills from over the series' run

== Spin-offs ==
=== Karen: The Musical ===
It had been announced that Megan Mullally would be creating and starring in a new Broadway musical titled Karen: The Musical. This musical would have had Mullally reprising her role of Karen Walker. She stated in an interview that the show may also involve recurring guest star Leslie Jordan in his role as Beverley Leslie, with a story revolving around their rivalry.

According to Mullally, the project was cancelled due to the rights to the Karen character being withdrawn. Mullally stated to have already gained approval from the network, as well as having the Broadway production company Fox Theatricals, director and choreographer Casey Nicholaw and composer Jeff Blumenkrantz all lined up to participate in the production, before certain stakeholders in the Karen Walker character withdrew the rights for its use in the production.

=== Jack & Karen ===
There had been talk in 2008 that a spin-off was being developed by NBC titled Jack & Karen, featuring Sean Hayes and Megan Mullally reprising their roles. Hayes initially showed interest in the spin-off but was ultimately put off by the Friends spin-off, Joey. Furthermore, Mullally's new work schedule in the form of her talk show, which was canceled several months later, did not allow her to pursue the spin-off at the time.

=== #VoteHoney ===
On September 26, 2016, the main cast—McCormack, Messing, Hayes, and Mullally, plus Morrison in a cameo role—reunited for a 10-minute web special, urging Americans to vote in the 2016 presidential election. In the special – titled #VoteHoney – Karen, an avid Donald Trump supporter, tries to persuade Jack to vote for Trump, while Will and Grace, both avid Hillary Clinton supporters, try to persuade him to vote for Clinton. At the end, Will reveals that singer Katy Perry is a supporter of Clinton, which persuades Jack to vote for Clinton. The success of the special resulted in the series' revival in 2017.

== See also ==
- Lists of television shows with LGBT characters
- Gimme Gimme Gimme – a British sitcom often compared to Will & Grace
