= Charles C. Stevenson Jr. =

American film and television actor

- Stevenson in Scandal, 2012
- Born: 1930/1931
- Died: January 19, 2026 (aged 95); Camarillo, California, U.S.
- Education: University of California, Berkeley
- Occupations: Film and television actor

Charles C. Stevenson Jr. (1930/1931 – January 19, 2026) was an American film and television actor. He was best known for playing the recurring role of Smitty, the bartender in the American sitcom television series Will & Grace from 2003 to 2006 and again from 2017 to 2020.

== Life and career ==
Stevenson was raised in Piedmont, California. He served in the United States Navy during the Korean War. After his discharge, he attended the University of California, Berkeley, earning his degree in English. He began his screen career in 1982, appearing in the NBC science fiction television series Voyagers!. In 1984, he appeared in the film Rhinestone.

Later in his career, Stevenson guest-starred in numerous television programs including Dynasty, The Middle, Knots Landing, Shameless, Everybody Loves Raymond, Spin City, Curb Your Enthusiasm, NewsRadio, Don't Trust the B— in Apartment 23, Weeds, The John Larroquette Show, House, Scandal and Matlock, and played the recurring role of Smitty, the bartender in the NBC sitcom television series Will & Grace from 2003 to 2006 and again from 2017 to 2020. He also appeared in films such as The Naked Gun: From the Files of Police Squad!, Naked Gun 33 1/3: The Final Insult, Ghost World, Snow Buddies, Men in Black, Sgt. Bilko and Ed Wood. His final credit was in Will & Grace in 2020.

== Death ==
Stevenson died of natural causes on January 19, 2026, in Camarillo, California, at the age of 95.
