= Leslie Jordan =

American actor, comedian, writer and singer (1955–2022)

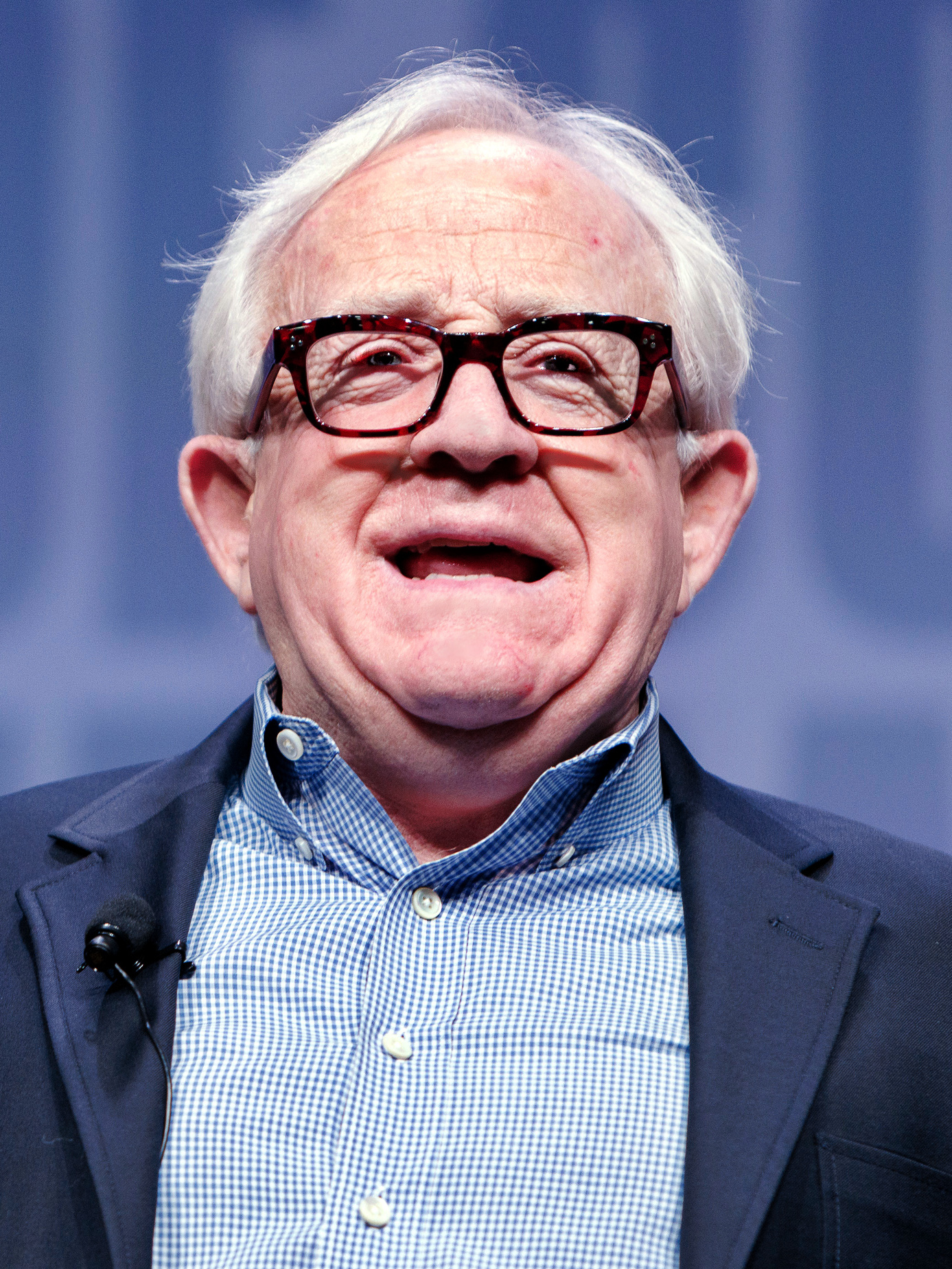
- Jordan in September 2022 at the National Book Festival
- Born: Leslie Allen Jordan; April 29, 1955; Chattanooga, Tennessee, U.S.
- Died: October 24, 2022 (aged 67); Los Angeles, California, U.S.
- Burial place: Hamilton Memorial Gardens
- Occupations: Actor; comedian; writer; singer
- Years active: 1986–2022

Leslie Allen Jordan (April 29, 1955 – October 24, 2022) was an American actor, comedian, writer, and singer. His television roles include Beverley Leslie on Will & Grace (2001–2006 and 2017–2020), several characters in the American Horror Story franchise (2013–2019), Sid on The Cool Kids (2018–2019), Phil on Call Me Kat (2021–2022), and Lonnie Garr on Hearts Afire (1993–1995). On stage, Jordan played Earl "Brother Boy" Ingram in the 1996 play Sordid Lives, later portraying the character in the 2000 film of the same name. During the COVID-19 pandemic, he became an Instagram contributor, amassing 5.8 million followers in 2020, and published his autobiography How Y'all Doing? Misadventures and Mischief from a Life Well Lived in April 2021.

== Early and personal life ==
Jordan was born in Memphis, Tennessee on April 29, 1955 and grew up in Chattanooga. He graduated from Brainerd High School. His mother was Peggy Ann Jordan (née Griffin; 1935–2022) and his father was Allen Bernard Jordan. The latter, a major in the United States Army Reserve, died along with two others in the crash of a civilian Beechcraft Debonair airplane at Camp Shelby, on March 31, 1967; at the time Leslie was almost 12 years old.

In 1982 Leslie Jordan moved to Los Angeles, where he became involved with drugs and alcohol and was arrested several times. He began to journal daily, which helped him recover from drug and alcohol abuse. In 2010, Jordan told talk show host Wendy Williams that he had been sober for 13 years. In the same appearance, Jordan said that before he gave up drinking, he once shared a cell with Robert Downey Jr., and when they both appeared later on Ally McBeal, Downey could not quite place where they had met before.

Jordan was gay. He said his mother was supportive and accepting, despite never truly understanding him. In a 2014 interview, he said that he had a difficult time growing up Southern Baptist. "I was baptized 14 times. Every time the preacher would say, 'Come forward, sinners!' I'd say, 'Oooh, I was out in the woods with that boy. I better go forward.'" Early in the AIDS crisis, Jordan became involved in AIDS Project Los Angeles as a buddy and as a food delivery-person for Project Angel Food.

== Career ==
=== Film and television ===
Jordan began his career in 1986, appearing as Malone in the adventure series The Fall Guy. He quickly became recognizable in the industry for his diminutive size and Southern drawl. He appeared as newspaper editor Mr. Blackly in the movie The Help. His television career includes guest appearances on Murphy Brown, Will & Grace, Lois & Clark: The New Adventures of Superman, Star Trek: Voyager, Caroline in the City, Pee-wee's Playhouse, Reba, Boston Public, Boston Legal, Nash Bridges, American Horror Story, Perfect Strangers, and Hearts Afire. In 1990, Jordan portrayed the ski patrol director in Ski Patrol. In 2007, he guest-starred on the comedy drama Ugly Betty as celebrity-trasher Quincy Combs, and he starred as Jesse Joe in the short-lived CW television program Hidden Palms.

On the television series Will & Grace, Jordan played Beverley Leslie, Karen Walker's pretentious, poorly-closeted rival, for which he received an Emmy Award for Outstanding Guest Actor in a Comedy Series at the 58th Annual Primetime Emmy Awards in 2006. His Emmy Award earned him an invitation to present the awards for Outstanding Writing for a Comedy Series and Outstanding Directing for a Comedy Series at the 2006 Emmy Awards with Cloris Leachman a week later. Jordan starred in the pilot episode of Laugh Out, the world's first interactive, gay-themed comedy show. On August 18, 2014, he became a housemate in the fourteenth season of the British reality game show Celebrity Big Brother. He was the second person to leave the Big Brother house (August 29, 2014). In January 2015, he guest-starred in the British sitcom Benidorm for two episodes, as the character Buck A. Roo. On November 1, 2017, he appeared in the new British television drama Living the Dream, produced jointly by Sky and Big Talk Productions but branded as a Sky Original Production. In 2018–2019, he starred in the Fox sitcom The Cool Kids, along with Martin Mull, Vicki Lawrence, and David Alan Grier.

On April 2, 2020, it was announced Jordan would play the series regular role of Phil in the Fox sitcom Call Me Kat, along with Mayim Bialik, Swoosie Kurtz, Kyla Pratt, and Cheyenne Jackson. The show premiered in January 2021. In the same year, Jordan was a guest panelist on season six of The Masked Singer during Week 5 where he also did a performance of "This Little Light of Mine" as "Soft Serve". He later returned as a guest panelist in season seven and season eight. A posthumously-airing holiday episode of Lego Masters was one of his final works before his death.

=== Theater ===
Jordan played Earl "Brother Boy" Ingram in Sordid Lives and also portrayed this character in the popular cult film of the same name. He reprised the role in a televised spin-off of the movie, which aired on Logo, where he played a character who is institutionalized in a mental hospital. He wrote and starred in the autobiographical play Lost in the Pershing Point Hotel, which was made into a motion picture. In 2004, he toured the country performing his one-man stage comedy, Like a Dog on Linoleum, to generally favorable reviews.

Jordan's first autobiographical stage show was called Hysterical Blindness and Other Southern Tragedies That Have Plagued My Life Thus Far, with music and lyrics by Joe Patrick Ward. The production, in which Jordan was backed by a gospel choir singing satirical songs about racism and homophobia, was produced off-Broadway at the SoHo Playhouse and ran for seven months. Next, he distilled his experiences growing up as an effeminate, tiny boy in the South and in show business into an autobiographical one-man show, My Trip Down the Pink Carpet. During the opening of My Trip Down the Pink Carpet, Jordan's microphone stopped working, but he kept on with the show like nothing happened; the show was a success. After touring the nation for several months with the production, the show opened off-Broadway at the Midtown Theater on April 19, 2010. The show was produced by Jordan's friend, actress Lily Tomlin. He announced on The Paul O'Grady Show that he would be bringing his show to London's Apollo Theatre.

=== Music ===
Jordan released a gospel music album, Company's Comin' in 2021.

=== Social media ===
At the time of his death, Jordan had accumulated 5.8 million Instagram followers. His following grew substantially in response to his comedy posts during the COVID-19 pandemic.

== Death ==
On October 24, 2022, at approximately 9:30 am PDT, while driving to the Call Me Kat set, Jordan's car hit the side of a building at Cahuenga Boulevard and Romaine Street in Hollywood, California. He was believed to have experienced a medical episode that led to the crash. He was pronounced dead at the scene. He was 67 years old.

In January 2023, the autopsy report said Jordan died by "sudden cardiac dysfunction", due to arteriosclerotic cardiovascular disease. There was no evidence of alcohol or other drugs in Jordan's system. At the time of his death, he had been sober for more than two decades.

== Awards ==
In 2006, Jordan won an Outstanding Guest Actor in a Comedy Series Emmy Award for his part as Beverley Leslie in Will & Grace.

In 2021, Jordan received GALECA: The Society of LGBTQ Entertainment Critics' Timeless Star award, the group's career achievement honor given to "an actor or performer whose exemplary career is marked by character, wisdom and wit." He accepted the award in the Society's Dorian Awards 'Toast' TV.

== Credits ==
=== Writer ===
- Lost in the Pershing Point Hotel (play)
- My Trip Down the Pink Carpet (2008)
- Hysterical Blindness and Other Southern Tragedies That Have Plagued My Life Thus Far
- How Y'all Doing?: Misadventures and Mischief from a Life Well Lived (2021)

=== Stage ===
- Found a Peanut (1986)
- Sordid Lives (1996)
- Southern Baptist Sissies (2000)
- Lost in the Pershing Point Hotel
- Like a Dog on Linoleum (2004)
- My Trip Down the Pink Carpet (2010)
- Lucky Guy (2011); off-Broadway musical, in the role of Big Al Wright

== Filmography ==
=== Film ===
| Year | Title | Role | Notes |
|---|---|---|---|
| 1988 | Moving | Customer at Bar | |
| 1990 | Ski Patrol | Murray | |
| 1992 | Hero | Court Official | |
| 1992 | Missing Pieces | Krause | |
| 1993 | Jason Goes to Hell: The Final Friday | Shelby | |
| 1995 | Black Velvet Pantsuit | Ernie | |
| 1996 | Shoot the Moon | | |
| 1997 | Two Weeks from Sunday | | Short |
| 1998 | Goodbye Lover | Homer | |
| 1998 | Hamburger Helper | Larry Lewis | Short |
| 1999 | Eat Your Heart Out | Director | |
| 2000 | John John in the Sky | Tot Dixon | a.k.a. I'll Wave Back |
| 2000 | Lost in the Pershing Point Hotel | Storyteller | Writer (play; screenplay) |
| 2000 | Sordid Lives | Earl "Brother Boy" Ingram | |
| 2001 | The Gristle | Jake Bennett | |
| 2003 | Farm Sluts | Coroner | Short |
| 2003 | Moving Alan | Arthur | |
| 2004 | Home on the Range | Photographer (voice) | |
| 2004 | Madhouse | Dr. Morton | |
| 2005 | Sissy Frenchfry | Principal Principle | Short |
| 2007 | Watch & Learn | Martin | Short |
| 2007 | Undead or Alive: A Zombedy | Padre | |
| 2008 | Roadside Romeo | Additional voices | |
| 2009 | Eating Out 3: All You Can Eat | Harry | |
| 2009 | Rockabilly Baby | | Writer (play) |
| 2010 | Demonic Toys: Personal Demons | Prof. Butterfield | |
| 2010 | Love Ranch | Mr. Hainsworth | |
| 2010 | Leslie Jordan: My Trip Down the Pink Carpet | Himself | Stand up (also a book) |
| 2011 | The Help | Mr. Blackly | |
| 2011 | Mangus! | Bruce Jackson | |
| 2012 | Hollywood to Dollywood | Himself | |
| 2012 | Yahoo! News/Funny or Die GOP Presidential Online Internet Cyber Debate | Ron Paul | |
| 2013 | Southern Baptist Sissies | Peanut | |
| 2014 | Lucky Dog | Mr. Kaufman | |
| 2016 | Fear, Inc. | Judson | |
| 2017 | A Very Sordid Wedding | Earl "Brother Boy" Ingram | |
| 2021 | The United States vs. Billie Holiday | Reginald Lord Devine | |
| 2021 | I'm Not for Everyone | Himself | Music Video |
| TBA | Strangers in a Strange Land | Gentleman | Post-production; posthumous release |

=== Television ===
| Year | Title | Role | Notes |
|---|---|---|---|
| 1986 | The Fall Guy | Malone | |
| 1986 | The Wizard | Jimmy | |
| 1987 | CBS Summer Playhouse | Worm | |
| 1988 | Frankenstein General Hospital | Iggy | |
| 1988 | Night Court | Irwin | |
| 1989 | Midnight Caller | Little Bob Johnson | |
| 1989 | Murphy Brown | Kyle | |
| 1989 | Newhart | L. Gardner | |
| 1989 | The People Next Door | Truman Fipps | 10 episodes |
| 1989 | The Road Raiders | Whip | Uncredited |
| 1990 | American Dreamer | Short | |
| 1990 | Babes | Clem | |
| 1990 | Pee-wee's Playhouse | Busby | |
| 1990 | Sugar and Spice | Monsieur Jacques | |
| 1991 | Top of the Heap | Emmet Lefebvre | 6 episodes |
| 1992 | Bodies of Evidence | Lemar Samuels | 16 episodes |
| 1992 | Perfect Strangers | Rob Bob Phillips | |
| 1992–1993 | Reasonable Doubts | Asst. Public Defender Clifford Sizemore; Marvin Sizemore | 16 episodes |
| 1993 | Getting By | Mr. Bergner | |
| 1993–1994 | Lois & Clark: The New Adventures of Superman | Alan Morris / The Invisible Man; William Wallace Webster Waldecker / Resplendent Man | |
| 1993 | Nurses | Mr. Cooley Waits | |
| 1993–1995 | Hearts Afire | Lonnie Garr | 28 episodes |
| 1994 | Roseanne | Gordy | |
| 1995 | Charlie Grace | Darnell Sims | |
| 1995 | Courthouse | Mr. Barnes | |
| 1996 | Coach | Blatt | |
| 1996 | Star Trek: Voyager | Kol | Episode: "False Profits" |
| 1996 | Mr. & Mrs. Smith | Earl Borden | |
| 1997 | Arli$ | Skip Lloyd | |
| 1997 | The Pretender | Pat | |
| 1997 | Weird Science | Boyd Butayne | |
| 1997 | Wings | Teddy Kolb | |
| 1998 | Buddy Faro | Frankie Delgado | |
| 1998 | Caroline in the City | Dr. Leslie | |
| 1998 | Dharma & Greg | Kenny | |
| 1998 | Ellen | Top Studio Executive | |
| 1998 | Maximum Bob | Cletus Huntley | |
| 1998 | Pacific Blue | Bo Nyby | |
| 1999 | Martial Law | Horatio Hawkins | |
| 2000 | Any Day Now | Big Top Police Officer | |
| 2000 | FreakyLinks | Hotel Clerk | |
| 2000 | Nash Bridges | Walter Marley | |
| 2000 | Sabrina, the Teenage Witch | Chuck | |
| 2000 | The Strip | Gaston | |
| 2000, 2002 | Son of the Beach | Jordan | 2 episodes |
| 2001 | Ally McBeal | Dr. Benjamin Harris | |
| 2001–2002 | Boston Public | Dr. Benjamin Harris | Recurring role; 5 episodes |
| 2001–2006, 2017–2020 | Will & Grace | Beverley Leslie | 17 episodes |
| 2003 | Judging Amy | Reginald Hoyt | |
| 2003 | Tracey Ullman in the Trailer Tales | Rog Monroe | |
| 2003–2004 | Reba | Terry / Jeweller | Recurring role; 3 episodes |
| 2004 | George Lopez | Doctor | Episode: "Leave It To Lopez" |
| 2004 | Monk | Town Official | |
| 2005 | Boston Legal | Bernard Ferrion | Recurring role; 6 episodes |
| 2005 | Chasing Christmas | Past | |
| 2005–2006 | American Dad! | Beauregard LaFontaine (voice) | 2 episodes |
| 2007 | Ugly Betty | Quincy Combs | Episode: "Punch Out" |
| 2007 | Hidden Palms | Jesse Jo | Recurring role; 5 episodes |
| 2008 | 12 Miles of Bad Road | Kenny Kingman | Recurring role; 6 episodes |
| 2008 | Privileged | Dale Dart | |
| 2008 | Sordid Lives: The Series | Earl "Brother Boy" Ingram | 10 episodes |
| 2008–2011 | Under the Pink Carpet | Himself | 4 episodes |
| 2009 | Alligator Point | | |
| 2009 | Glenn Martin, DDS | Additional voices | |
| 2011 | Desperate Housewives | Felix Bergman | |
| 2011 | Shake It Up | Theodore Van Glorious | |
| 2012 | DTLA | Theatre Director | |
| 2012 | The Game | Donatella Sweetescott | |
| 2012 | The Secret Life of the American Teenager | | Episode: "I Do and I Don't..." |
| 2012 | The Neighbors | Carla | Episode: "Thanksgiving Is for the Bird-Kersees" |
| 2012–2013 | Raising Hope | Reverend Bob | |
| 2013 | The Exes | Percy | Episode: "Toy Story" |
| 2013 | American Horror Story: Coven | Quentin Fleming | Recurring role; 3 episodes |
| 2013 | Supernatural | Yorkie, Mutt (voice) | Episode: "Dog Dean Afternoon" |
| 2013 | Baby Daddy | Edwin the Mall Elf | Episode: "Emma's First Christmas" |
| 2013, 2022 | RuPaul's Drag Race | Himself | 2 episodes, including "RuPaul Roast"; guest judge/guest director |
| 2014 | Partners | Marion Phillips | Episode: "Jurist Prudence" |
| 2014 | Celebrity Big Brother UK | Himself | Series 14, 12 episodes |
| 2015 | Benidorm | Buck A. Roo | Series 7, episodes 1 & 2 |
| 2015–2017 | Con Man | Leslie Jordan / 'Curley' | Recurring role; 6 episodes |
| 2016 | American Horror Story: Roanoke | Ashley Gilbert (reenactor of Cricket Marlowe) | Recurring role; 3 episodes |
| 2016 | K.C. Undercover | Cecil B. DeVille | |
| 2017 | Life in Pieces | Neils | Episode: "Poison Fire Teats Universe" |
| 2017–2019 | Living the Dream | Aiden | |
| 2018 | The Last Sharknado: It's About Time | Benjamin Franklin | |
| 2018–2019 | The Cool Kids | Sid | Main role |
| 2019 | American Horror Story: 1984 | Courtney | Recurring role; 4 episodes |
| 2021 | The Great North | Thomas Wintersbone (voice) | Episode: "Pride and Prejudice Adventure" |
| 2021 | Fantasy Island | Jasper | Episode: "Día de los Vivos" |
| 2021 | Special | Charles | Episode: "Why Is No One Ready?" |
| 2021–2022 | Call Me Kat | Phil | Main role |
| 2021–2022 | The Masked Singer | Soft Serve/Guest panelist | 4 episodes |
| 2022 | Trixie Motel | Himself | Episode: "Malibu Barbara" |
| 2022 | Celebrity IOU | Himself | Posthumous release |
| 2022 | Lego Masters | Himself | Episode: "Celebrity Holiday Bricktacular"; posthumous release |

== Discography ==
- Company's Comin' (April 2, 2021)
