= Laura Kightlinger =

American actress and writer (born 1968/1969)

- Born: 1968 or 1969 (age 57–58); Jamestown, New York, U.S.
- Occupations: Actress; writer; comedian
- Years active: 1991–present
- Partner: Jack Black (1996–2005)
- Website: laurakightlinger.com

Laura Kightlinger (born 1968 or 1969) is an American actress, writer and comedian. She was a writer and consulting producer on Will & Grace, while also occasionally appearing on the show as the character Nurse Sheila. Her 2003 documentary about New York drug reform, Sixty Spins Around the Sun, won numerous awards. Kightlinger also played the titular character in the TV show The Minor Accomplishments of Jackie Woodman, which she created, wrote, and executive produced.

== Early life ==
Kightlinger was born in Jamestown, New York.

== Career ==
=== Television ===
Kightlinger was a featured player for Saturday Night Live (1994–95).

In 1997, she appeared in the Tenacious D episode "Angel in Disguise" as a groupie.

In 2006, she appeared in The Minor Accomplishments of Jackie Woodman, a comedy series. Asked how much of the series was based on her personal experience, she said:

I think like 85% and then the other 15 is the experience of a woman. We usually cull a lot of stories from what happened to us and our friends, so I'd say a lot of it is. I always feel like rejection is my petrol. That's what keeps me going.

Kightlinger has had three stand-up comedy specials on HBO and six on Comedy Central.

=== Film ===
In 1997, Kightlinger appeared in Who's the Caboose?, an independent movie comedy starring Sarah Silverman and directed by Sam Seder.

In 2001, Kightlinger made a short film, Dependable People, which won both the Black Maria Film Festival Director's Citation (Honorable Mention) and the International Festival of Cinema and Technology Best New Director Award in 2002. It was released on the DVD Celebrity Mix with other short films in 2006.

In 2003, she directed her first documentary, Sixty Spins Around the Sun, which chronicles the New York City street movement to repeal the Rockefeller Drug Laws. It focuses on political satirist turned activist Randy Credico and his fight to repeal the laws. The film follows Credico to Tulia, Texas during a racially motivated drug bust. Included in this documentary are stand-up comics Larry David, Colin Quinn, Don Gavin, Vanessa Hollingshead, and Nick DiPaolo. It won Best Documentary at the 2003 Empire State Film Festival, 2003 Boston International Film Festival, and 2005 Beverly Hills Film Festival (Jury Award).

In 2005, Kightlinger starred in the short film Dysenchanted, directed by Terri Edda Miller, which received critical acclaim.

In 2017, she had a cameo in The Lego Batman Movie, voicing the roles of Orca and Reporter Pippa.

She has written and directed several short films, including Cat Demon: Re-Exhumed, which are available to view on her website.

Additional film credits include Daddy Day Care, Kicking & Screaming, Wake Up, Ron Burgundy: The Lost Movie, The Truth About Lies and The Outdoorsman.

=== Book ===
Kightlinger's book Quick Shots of False Hope was published in 1999. The New York Times Book Review described it as "funny and disturbing", "memorable", and an "idiosyncratic and darkly comic debut." As of 2006, she was adapting the book for film.

=== Internet ===
Kightlinger has written several shorts for Funny or Die and Atom.com, including "American Heroine", in which she starred, and "Roy Fabcock: Legendary Lover" (2010).

== Personal life ==
Kightlinger dated fellow actor and comedian Jack Black from 1996 through early 2005.

Kightlinger endorsed Senator Bernie Sanders for President in the 2016 U.S. presidential election.

== Bibliography ==
- Kightlinger, Laura (October 1999). Quick Shots of False Hope: A Rejection Collection. Avon Books. ISBN 0380810468.
