= Louis (film) =

- Poster
- Directed by: Dan Pritzker
- Written by: Derick Martini; Steven Martini; Dan Pritzker; David N. Rothschild
- Produced by: Jon Cornick; Michele Tayler; Derick Martini; Steven Martini
- Starring: Jackie Earle Haley; Shanti Lowry; Anthony Coleman
- Cinematography: Vilmos Zsigmond
- Edited by: Mark Yoshikawa; Richard Chew
- Music by: Wynton Marsalis
- Release date: August 25, 2010
- Running time: 70 minutes
- Country: United States

Louis is a 2010 American silent drama film written by Derick Martini, Steven Martini, Dan Pritzker and David N. Rothschild, directed by Pritzker and starring Jackie Earle Haley, Shanti Lowry and Anthony Coleman.

== Cast ==
- Jackie Earle Haley as Judge Perry
- Shanti Lowry as Grace
- Anthony Coleman as Young Louis Armstrong
- Michael Rooker as Pat McMurphy
- Joe Chrest as Tom Anderson
- Steven Martini as Alex Karnofsky
- Derick Martini as Morris Karnofsky
- Carmen de Lavallade
- Anthony Mackie as Buddy Bolden
- Angela Ray as Mayann Armstrong

== Release ==
The film was screened on August 25, 2010.

In 2025 Musician Wynton Marsalis did a live concert to the film on an eleven screen west coast tour.

== Reception ==
The film has a 33% rating on Rotten Tomatoes based on six reviews. Andrew Schenker of Slant Magazine awarded the film one star out of four.

Ronnie Scheib of Variety gave the film a negative review and wrote, "though commendably attentive to Chaplin-esque pantomime on the part of lead villain Jackie Earle Haley, this cinematic anomaly (press-screened with the pre-recorded score) falls flat as a stand-alone, though doubtless wows in context."

The Associated Press via The Hollywood Reporter gave the film a positive review: "A faux black-and-white silent film that will gain immeasurably from its road show presentations, Louis is more of a novelty than a satisfying cinematic experience."
