= Vescio =

Vescio is a surname. Notable people with this surname include:

- Darcy Vescio (born 1993), Australian rules footballer
- Dave Vescio (born 1970), American actor, retired soldier, and photojournalist
