= Derick Martini =

American actor

- Born: 1975 or 1976 (age 50–51) New York City
- Occupation: Director, screenwriter, editor
- Spouse: Angela Somerville Martini
- Children: 2

Derick Martini is an American screenwriter and film director and an owner of commercial property and advertising billboards located in New York City.

== Film and television ==
Martini's feature film writing credits include the coming of age story Lymelife starring Alec Baldwin, Emma Roberts and Rory Culkin, which he wrote with his brother Steven Martini. Lymelife marked Martini's directorial debut and premiered at the Toronto International Film Festival in September 2008, where it won the International Federation of Film Critics (FIPRESCI) Award for best film. Martini also received a nomination for Breakthrough Director from the 2009 Gotham Awards for the film. Lymelife was filmed in 22 days and on a budget of 1.5 million dollars. Martin Scorsese, a producer of Lymelife, is a champion of Martini's work.

At the time, Martini was the youngest filmmaker to ever win the prestigious International Federation of Film Critics (FIPRESCI) award.

Before turning to directing Martini script doctored numerous studio feature films for which he is uncredited.

Martini's other feature film credits include 2000's Smiling Fish and Goat on Fire, written, produced and starring both he and his brother Steven Martini. It premiered at the Toronto International Film Festival where it won the festival's Discovery Award; and went on to a theatrical release. Bolden, a full-length feature film he co-wrote with the director Daniel Pritzker depicting the life of obscure jazz legend Buddy Bolden; and Louis, a black and white silent film chronicling the early days of Louis Armstrong and his quest to acquire his first trumpet.

Hick, his second feature film as a director, is based on the autobiographical novel of the same name and stars Chloë Grace Moretz, Eddie Redmayne and Blake Lively. Its author, Andrea Portes, adapted her own work for the screen. Hick premiered at the Toronto International Film Festival on September 10, 2011, to extremely divisive critical and audience responses. In a negative review, Roger Ebert praised Martini as a "gifted filmmaker", but questioned the point of the film. The film was released theatrically in 2012 by Phase 4 Films.

Martini dropped out of film school and was invited to develop his film Lymelife at The Sundance Institute Filmmaker's Lab where he met Kieran Culkin who was cast as the lead character of Scott for the experimental scenes. When the film was ready to go into production, Martini and Culkin felt he was too old to play the lead character. Martini, an avid fan of Kieran's younger brother Rory Culkin was cast as Scott and Martini offered the role of Scott's older brother, Jimmy, to Kieran. Martini became so attached to the idea of real brothers playing brothers in the film, he has said that he could never have made the film as well as he did without the real sibling dynamic Kieran and Rory brought to the project.

After "Lymelife" premiered to raves and an award and was picked up for theatrical distribution in 2008 at the Toronto International Film Festival, Martini pushed for the film go unreleased until the programmers at the Sundance Film Festival, to whom Martini was very grateful, got a chance to see the film and decide if they wanted to put it in their line up despite it not being considered a "premiere". The programmers chose to invite the film to show at the 2009 Sundance Film Festival where it again garnered more raves but caused its theatrical release to be delayed until April 29, 2009.

His television credits include the Jennifer Lopez-produced television series South Beach, and a remake of Alex Raymond's Flash Gordon.

== Personal life ==
Martini married actress Amy Hathaway in 2001 and divorced her in 2003.

== Filmography ==
Year	Title	Notes
2000	Smiling Fish and Goat on Fire	Screenwriter, screen story and producer: Toronto International Film Festival Discovery Award winner; Milan International Film Festival Audience Award winner
2006	South Beach	Series writer (1.5: "Who Do You Trust") and story editor
2007	Flash Gordon	Co-writer (1.2: "Pride")
2009	Lymelife	Director and screenwriter: International Federation of Film Critics Award Winner for Best Director and Best Feature Film; Gotham Award Nominee for Breakthrough Director; Milan International Film Festival Winner for Best Director and Screenplay
2010	Louis	Screenwriter and producer with Wynton Marsalis Feature-length black and white silent film
2011	Hick	Director Feature film based on the novel by Andrea Portes, screenplay by Andrea Portes
2014	The Curse of Downers Grove	Director and screenwriter
