= Gemini Rising =

2013 film by Dana Schroeder

- Theatrical release poster
- Directed by: Dana Schroeder
- Written by: Michael Todd; Kenny Yakkel
- Produced by: Tim Anderson; Peter Tunney; Steven Ameche; Cyril O'Reilly
- Starring: Lance Henriksen; Amy Hathaway; John Savage; Brian Krause; Dave Vescio
- Cinematography: Keith L. Smith
- Edited by: Nathaniel Nose
- Music by: Andrew Morgan Smith
- Production companies: Pathfinder Film Group; Pathfinder Productions
- Distributed by: Nikkatsu; AMG Entertainment; Breaking Glass Pictures; FilmCanal; Pathfinder Films; Safecracker Pictures
- Release date: July 3, 2013 (Japan); (DVD premiere)
- Running time: 93 mins
- Country: United States
- Language: English

Gemini Rising (also known as Alien Rising) is a 2013 American sci-fi action thriller produced by Tim Anderson and directed by Dana Schroeder. The film stars Lance Henriksen, Amy Hathaway, John Savage, Brian Krause and Dave Vescio. This was Hathaway's final film role before she retired from acting.

== Plot ==
In 2023, an unidentified spacecraft is found orbiting Neptune and an investigation is started. Meanwhile, Lisa (Amy Hathaway), a special agent for the DEA witnesses what she thinks is the death of her best friend, Manning (John Savage), during a drug raid. She quits her job to become a dance teacher, but is soon recruited again for a secret mission, and shipped off to a small remote island.

On the island she finds out the secret mission is an investigation into the alien spacecraft that was found orbiting Neptune. She discovers two aliens were found; one small, one larger and of a different species, with the smaller alien (which looks somewhat like an underdeveloped foetus with typical 'grey alien' large eyes) controlling the much larger and robust one through telepathy. The team has nicknamed the larger alien 'Spike' due to its spiky and ominous appearance. Later, in attempting to escape or explore her surroundings, Lisa has a surprise meeting with her old friend Manning whom she had thought was dead. After a discussion with Colonel Cencula (Lance Henriksen) it comes to light that Lisa's sister also worked on the alien investigation but was killed through unknown circumstances (later revealed to be due to a mistaken overdose of the serum they're trying to develop), and that Lisa was chosen because of the natural psychic/telepathic link she shared with her twin sister.

After seeing the smaller alien, which is imprisoned in a glass chamber, and forming a chance telepathic connection with it, Lisa is tested for a mental connection with her twin sister by Dr. Bainbridge (Dave Vescio). During the investigation Lisa meets Plummer (Brian Krause) and builds a friendship with him which soon blossoms into romance. Meanwhile, Colonel Cencula, Manning, and the doctor are working together to try and develop a serum to control people using the alien's telepathic technology. The Colonel sells this mind control technology to a North Korean billionaire for $4 billion. Lisa learns of the Colonel's plans, steals the access codes to the money/account, and attempts to flee the island.

Colonel Cencula starts a hunt for Lisa and sends Plummer after her, but with Manning controlling him through their telepathy technology. Manning finds Lisa and attacks her but Lisa soon discerns it is really Manning via his obnoxious behavior, and begs Plummer to fight the mind control. Ultimately Plummer regains enough control to kill himself rather than risking harming Lisa. Enraged, Cencula kills Manning with a shot to the head for failing him. He then calls for a full evacuation of the island and releases the large alien, forcing Doctor Bainbridge to control 'Spike' to pursue Lisa. Fleeing from the alien, Lisa runs into a mine field and the alien sets off the mines causing a landslide, burying them both. The Colonel presumes they're dead, but both Lisa and the large alien are still alive as the little alien had managed to wrest control from the doctor and used "Spike" to protect Lisa from being crushed. The small alien informs Lisa telepathically that it wants her to help free both aliens.

With help from the aliens Lisa defeats the military army on the island and they both confront the Colonel Cencula. Lisa begs him to stop the torture and release the aliens. When he emphatically refuses the large alien disarms him and rips him to shreds. Lisa frees both aliens and they escape as the island is set to self-destruct. The aliens thank and warn Lisa to quickly run, then take to their spaceship.

Lisa is rescued from the island via a helicopter, relaying to the superior officer therein that the corrupt colonel and the experiment have been destroyed, that the aliens are 'gone,' and that it's best they take off before the whole island blows up. Meanwhile, somewhere below, in a somewhat cryptic scene, Dr. Bainbridge is seen rowing down a river with a metal suitcase and what appears to be the comatose body of Lisa's twin sister.

As the entire island blows, a spaceship takes off back into space...

== Cast ==
- Lance Henriksen as Colonel Stephen Cencula
- Amy Hathaway as Lisa Morgan
- John Savage as Manning
- Brian Krause as Plummer
- Dave Vescio as Dr. Bainbridge
