= Deal or No Deal (Indian game show) =

Indian game show

- Genre: Game show
- Creative director: Manav Dhanda
- Presented by: R. Madhavan; Mandira Bedi; Rajeev Khandelwal; Ronit Roy
- Country of origin: India
- Original language: Hindi
- No. of seasons: 4

Production
- Executive producer: Manisha
- Producers: Miditech; Endemol India
- Camera setup: Multi-camera

Original release
- Network: Sony Entertainment Television (season 1 - 3) &TV (season 4)
- Release: 23 November 2005 – 29 November 2015

Deal or No Deal (Note: Also known as Deal Ya No Deal in Hindi.) is an Indian adaptation of the popular international game show of the same name, which is owned and produced by Endemol International.

It premiered on 23 November 2005 on Sony Entertainment Television and aired on three nights each week. The first series had a set similar to the Spanish version, and the theme song and music cues were the same as those used in the Dutch version. Contestants held the boxes. The top prize is 10,000,000 rupees (about $142,000 USD), and the lowest prize is 25 paise (a paisa is the Indian counterpart to a cent/penny). The second lowest prize was originally 1 rupee, but was later changed to a Chlormint (an Indian breath refresher). It was hosted by Madhavan, but he quit after fulfilling his 35-episode contract, and was replaced by Mandira Bedi.

The second series premiered in late January 2006 and had a set virtually identical to the Australian version, except there were 22 briefcases. In this series, when the contestant picked a case, the contestant that held the case could guess the amount in it. If they guessed correctly, they would win Rs. 50,000.

After the second series, Mandira Bedi quit, citing time constraints as the reason for her departure. Therefore, the third season of the series, which premiered in April 2006, was presented by a new host, Rajeev Khandelwal, and aired once weekly. The third series features a new set and new graphics that are virtually identical to those used on the American version. Even though it was a lot similar to the US version, the third series did not have any games that carried over and did not show previous offers when it was time for the offer. Models were also introduced to hold the briefcases, instead of the contestants in series 1 and 2. In this series, once the host calls out the name of the contestant, he asks them a question with 2 possible answers. If they give the correct answer, they will get to play. At the end of most episodes of series 3, Rajeev ended by saying, "Keep Smiling!" This version ended in July 2006, as it was believed viewers couldn't connect with the concept.

== Season 4 on &TV ==
Season 4 of this show was aired from 5 September 2015 to 29 November 2015 and will air on Saturday-Sunday nights at 8:00pm on &TV.

== Case values ==
=== First and Second Series (2005-06) ===
25 paisa	₹ 50,000
₹ 1	₹ 1,00,000
₹ 10	₹ 2,00,000
₹ 100	₹ 3,00,000
₹ 250	₹ 4,00,000
₹ 500	₹ 5,00,000
₹ 1,000	₹ 10,00,000
₹ 2,500	₹ 25,00,000
₹ 5,000	₹ 50,00,000
₹ 7,500	₹ 75,00,000
₹ 10,000	₹ 1,00,00,000

=== Third Series (2006) ===
25 paisa	₹ 1,00,000
₹ 1	₹ 1,50,000
₹ 10	₹ 2,00,000
₹ 100	₹ 3,00,000
₹ 250	₹ 4,00,000
₹ 500	₹ 5,00,000
₹ 1,000	₹ 7,50,000
₹ 2,500	₹ 10,00,000
₹ 5,000	₹ 15,00,000
₹ 10,000	₹ 25,00,000
₹ 25,000	₹ 50,00,000
₹ 50,000	₹ 75,00,000
₹ 75,000	₹ 1,00,00,000

=== Fourth Series (2015) ===
₹ 1	₹ 1,00,000
₹ 10	₹ 2,00,000
₹ 100	₹ 3,00,000
₹ 500	₹ 4,00,000
₹ 1,000	₹ 5,00,000
₹ 2,500	₹ 6,00,000
₹ 5,000	₹ 7,50,000
₹ 10,000	₹ 10,00,000
₹ 20,000	₹ 15,00,000
₹ 30,000	₹ 20,00,000
₹ 40,000	₹ 25,00,000
₹ 50,000	₹ 50,00,000
₹ 75,000	₹ 1,00,00,000
