= Steven Martini =

American actor

- Born: 1975 or 1976 (age 48–49); New York City
- Occupation(s): Screenwriter, actor, producer, composer, singer/songwriter

Steven Martini is an American writer, actor, composer, editor, and singer/songwriter. His first break as an actor was as Cadet Alex J. Stone in Major Payne. He and his brother Derick Martini wrote the films Smiling Fish and Goat on Fire and Lymelife. Based on experiences from the Martinis' childhood, Lymelife won the FIPRESCI award at the 2008 Toronto International Film Festival, and premiered at the 2009 Sundance Film Festival. Martini is also known for being the singer/songwriter for the Los Angeles–based band The Spaceship Martini.

== Personal life ==
After the release of Major Payne, Martini moved to Los Angeles to work in film and television. Derick soon followed suit, and, before long, they started making Smiling Fish and Goat on Fire, in which they play the titular brother characters. The Martini brothers have gone on to portray Alex and Morris Karnofsky in Louis, a silent film they co-wrote, based on the historical brothers who helped Louis Armstrong get his first trumpet.

The story of Lymelife is based on Steven and Derick's childhood in the New York suburbs of Long Island. After the incidents of the film, Steven moved from Long Island back into his birthplace of New York City, where he attended the Professional Children's School. There, he met the Culkin brothers, who portrayed the Martini brothers on film. It was during this period that Steven met Adrianna, whose father had Lyme disease. This relationship is the basis of the love story between Rory Culkin and Emma Roberts in the film.

During the Sundance Labs, Kieran Culkin played the role of Scott, which is based on Steven, and later was played by his brother Rory Culkin. Steven played Jimmy, the role eventually played by Kieran, and based on older brother Derick. Alec Baldwin played their father. His brother William Baldwin co-produced Lymelife.

== Career ==
Because of his early roles including Major Payne and the TV series Prince Street, many of his viewers saw Steven as an up-an-coming star who bears a strong resemblance to a young Mel Gibson because of his looks, voice, and acting skills. Steven's writing career began instead with Smiling Fish and Goat on Fire, a film he and his brother financed for $50,000 and starred as the title roles, which won the Discovery Award at the 1999 Toronto International Film Festival. Smiling Fish was co-written and directed by Steven's friend and fellow Professional Children's School alumni, Kevin Jordan. The film drew from experiences in the Martini brothers' lives.

His second script, Lymelife, was accepted in the Sundance Institute's Film Program, where he and Derick shot, edited, and scored several scenes, which were reviewed by celebrity creative advisers. Some of this experience was recorded in Sundance 20, a documentary film made by director Doug Pray.

Martini is currently the singer/songwriter of The Spaceship Martini. "Spaceship" is Martini's nickname, based on his "out there" demeanor. The music of the Spaceship Martini is an ever-evolving mix of storytelling and sound, often centering on the lyrics that Martini writes. Most recently they scored Lymelife.

Martini started editing Lymelife during the 22-day film shoot in New Jersey on Final Cut Pro, a program he learned during pre-production. The film's score, which was recorded under the Spaceship Martini moniker, evolved out of the editing process.
