= Eddie Griffin: Going for Broke =

2009 VH1 television series

Eddie Griffin: Going for Broke is an American reality documentary television series on VH1 that debuted September 14, 2009. The series chronicles the life of comedian Eddie Griffin's financial foibles caused by the family and friends he's supporting plus the help he's receiving from his mother, who has moved in with him.

== Episodes ==
No.	Title	Original release date
1	"Mama Drama"	September 14, 2009
2	"Love Is Blind"	September 21, 2009
3	"Karma's a Bitch"	September 28, 2009
4	"Working Clean"	October 5, 2009
5	"Opportunity Rocks!"	October 12, 2009
6	"Going for Broke"	October 19, 2009

== Reception ==
Melissa Camacho of Common Sense Media wrote, "While Griffin's generosity seems genuine, the show's depiction of family isn't always the most positive. ... And some of Griffin's attempts to curb his own negative behaviors -- like hosting flamboyant parties, drinking, and smoking -- seem a bit half-hearted, too. But all that aside, there are definitely real lessons to be learned here." Variety's Brian Lowry said of the show, "If VH1 is looking to spruce up its besmirched celeb-reality profile, it could probably start with a judicious snip or two of its own."
