= Time Bomb 9/11 =

- A promotional image of "Time Bomb 9/11" featuring Rajeev Khandelwal as Varun Awasthi.
- Created by: Zee Telefilms Limited in association with Maya Movies Pvt. Ltd.
- Directed by: Ketan Mehta
- Starring: see below
- Opening theme: "Time Bomb"
- Country of origin: India
- No. of seasons: 1
- No. of episodes: 24

Production
- Running time: approx. 40 minutes

Original release
- Network: Zee TV
- Release: 20 June – 28 November 2005

Time Bomb 9/11 or just Time Bomb was a Hindi political thriller that aired on Zee TV from 20 June 2005 to 28 November 2005. It used to air every Monday at 10:00pm, and the show had a similar format to "24". The story focuses on Osama bin Laden and his terrorist group aiming to destroy the city of New Delhi on 11 September as well as assassinating the Indian Prime Minister who was played by Kay Kay Menon. A RAW group led by Field Officer Varun Awasthi (played by Rajeev Khandelwal) has to protect the Prime Minister and more importantly, the city.

It also starred Pankaj Tripathi as one of the RAW Officers. Umar Abbasi acted as a golfer turned rogue.

== Cast ==
- Rajeev Khandelwal as Field Officer Varun Awasthi
- Ujjwal Chopra as Amar RAW Agent
- Amrita Raichand as Roma Awasthi
- Akashdeep Saigal as Usmaan Bin Laden
- Kay Kay Menon as Prime Minister of India Anirudh Prakash
- Rajat Kapoor as Industrialist Narendra Nath
- Amruta Khanvilkar as Anu, Prime Minister's Daughter
- Shrivallabh Vyas as Osama bin Laden
- Aamir Bashir as Mr. Sejpal/ R. Diwan, Contract Killer from South Africa
- Shivani Tanksale as Menaka Senior Field Officer
- Denzil Smith as Head of ACT RAW
- Pankaj Tripathi as ACT RAW Officer Tripathi
- Vivan Bhatena
- Anupam Shyam as Ramji Yadav, one of the MP (He was later revealed to be involved in the conspiracy against the PM)
- Bikramjeet Kanwarpal as Dr. Ghoshal
- Abhijit Lahiri
- Anand Abhyankar
- Igal Fingali as Habib
- Achyut Potdar as The President of India
