= Reporters (Indian TV series) =

- Genre: Newsroom drama
- Created by: Rose Audio Visuals Pvt. Ltd.
- Written by: Sammeer Arora; Satyam Tripathi
- Directed by: Goldie Behl
- Creative director: Sheetal Kolvalkar
- Starring: Kritika Kamra; Rajeev Khandelwal
- Country of origin: India
- Original language: Hindi
- No. of seasons: 1
- No. of episodes: 132

Production
- Producers: Goldie Behl; Shrishti Arya
- Production location: Mumbai
- Camera setup: Multi-camera
- Production company: Rose Audio Visuals Pvt. Ltd.

Original release
- Network: Sony Entertainment Television
- Release: 13 April – 19 October 2015

Reporters is an Indian newsroom drama television series very loosely based on The Newsroom that premiered on 13 April 2015 on Sony Entertainment Television. The show stars Rajeev Khandelwal as Kabir and Kritika Kamra as Ananya.

Producer Shristi Arya stated that after meeting a reporter she was inspired to make a show based on journalists' life. The character of Kabir (Rajeev Khandelwal) is based on Rajdeep Sardesai and Arnab Goswami.

== Plot summary ==
Reporters is a story in a newsroom backdrop of journalists Ananya Kashyap (Kritika Kamra) and Kabir Sharma ( Rajeev Khandelwal). Ananya is a junior reporter at KKN, the news channel she works for run by Malvika (Megha Chatterjee), the daughter of KL Prasad, the owner of KKN and his friend and partner Khalid (Bikramjeet Kanwarpal). Kabir, after working for Delhi Kranti Newspaper, joins KKN as the Editor-in-Chief. Kabir's special news bulletins at 9 pm brings the show to number one in the ratings. Ananya also puts up her share in KKN's success due to her bright thinking and potential to be a good journalist.

Ananya carries an article that had been written many years ago by Kabir in which Kabir defends her father, Sudhir Kashyap, against accusations made about pharmaceutical company corruption. Because of Kabir, Ananya decided to become a journalist. Ananya and her family are still in the hope that someday they'll meet her father, who had suddenly disappeared after he was released on bail. After the success of KKN's achievement of number one in ratings, Ananya gets a call from a farmer-turned-gunman, Baghi Madhavnath, for an interview, which she wants to do, despite the dangers. Kabir also accompanies her, as this interview can be very useful for their channel (and he secretly also wants to protect her even though they both hate each other). They are abducted by Madhavnath and his gang. After a few episodes, the duo escape thanks to Kabir's quick thinking and skills and escape from the kidnappers, who chase them into the jungle. During the jungle episodes, Ananya and Kabir share a good time with each other. Later, she tells Kabir about her father's story, making Kabir realize that she is the daughter of Sudhir Kashyap. But Kabir deliberately enacts that he doesn't remember her father. The run and chase drama finally ends.

The police finally capture Baghi Madhavnath and his accomplices, and Ananya and Kabir make it to KKN Studio, where they do a joint interview on one of Madhavnath's henchmen who helped them escape from the jungle, after realising how wrong he was about them. Kabir and Ananya finally become friends, with both falling in love with each other without even realising. Ananya also ask for Kabir's help to find the real culprits behind conspiracy against her father. Later Kabir returns Ananya her father's wallet stating that her father committed suicide. Knowing about her father's demise, Ananya's best friend Ronnie (Puru Chibber) who secretly loves Ananya consoles her and her family in their grief. Seeing this Kabir turns jealous and drinks alcohol who had quit drinking long back.

In the same intoxicated condition, he reads the news bulletin and returns to Ananya's home and seeing Ronnie again with her family, he drives back home. While driving back, he gets into an accident. When Kabir is in hospital, Ananya spots Kabir having good time with Tarini, about whom world talks about being his mistress, but are actually very good friends. This leads to a misunderstanding between Kabir and Ananya and their fights and misunderstandings continue for a while. At the same time, Ronnie proposes Ananya and Ananya politely says no to him stating she just considered him as her best friend. This upsets Ronnie and he stops talking to Ananya. Taking advantage of these situations, Malvika plots to remove Ananya from KKN offering her a job in Mumbai with a higher raise and the post of senior reporter through her friend on Mumbai's news channel. Wanting to stay away from Kabir and their fights and also stop upsetting Ronnie, Ananya decides to grab the job and resigns from KKN. Knowing this, Ronnie resolves his issues with Ananya and they become friends again but this doesn't stop Ananya from leaving KKN. Knowing how much Kabir and Ananya actually love each other, their colleague, Trisha, insists Ananya to visit KKN office before she boards her flight to receive a farewell and plans to reunite Kabir and Ananya by lying to her about farewell party, as there wasn't anyone supposed to be in office as everyone had gone for a summit which Kabir didn't attend. Kabir and Ananya being alone in office. Kabir proposes to Ananya and opens his heart in front of her, after which they share a kiss.

Ananya and Kabir finally realize their love for each other and are brought together, and romantic instances start to take place. But then Malvika is not happy about this. She steals the video chip about arms and ammunition smuggling and makes Kabir believe that it was lost due to Ananya's carelessness. Kabir shouts at Ananya in front of everybody in the office. Kabir goes to drop Ananya and after a brief altercation, she fumes out of the car. During the office hours the cold war continues between the two. To apologize to her, on the insistence of Tarini, Kabir goes to her house and ends up telling Ananya's mother about their relationship, who is now upset. But when Kabir explains to her about them, she agrees happily. Kabir asks Ananya out on a dinner date and they spend a wonderful and a romantic night together. Meanwhile, at KKN he's offered to be a 2% shareholder but with a 3-year lock-in period.

Kabir accepts it after Ananya urges him to and Khalid is relieved. The new Business-Head shows up after the merger deal is closed and everyone is stunned to see that it's Shreya (Ankita Bhargava), Ex-Mrs. Kabir Sharma. Kabir sees through all the trickery and accuses Khalid and KL of conspiring against him to force him to stay. Shreya claims to have joined for purely professional reasons. Although in the beginning, Shreya is sweet and polite, especially with Ananya, Kabir doesn't believe her. Disturbed by her presence, Kabir decides to tell Ananya truth about his married life with Shreya. Kabir reveals that he had initially written about a scam at Shreya's office to which Shreya tries to resolve this matter cleverly and challenging her friends that she would make Kabir bow down to her, who is all about his self-respect and principles. Shreya belonged to a rich family and Kabir at that time didn't even own a home and stayed on rent. They both keep meeting again and again regarding work and fall in love and get hitched. Soon after, Shreya starts showing her true colors from time to time, insulting Kabir in front of her friends about his poor financial status. One day, he gets to know about her challenge while at a party with Shreya and her friends. Devastated, he lands on Tarini's doorstep, who is his intern and a good friend. But in a flow of emotions, they both end up spending the whole night together, crossing all limits of marriage, which puts Kabir under guilt for cheating on Shreya, and he confesses to her. Seeking this opportunity which she was waiting for, Shreya divorces Kabir for being unfaithful to her and defames him and Tarini. Kabir feels responsible for destroying Tarini's life and career and starts supporting her (by making her his stringer) and her younger brother Anurag for their living. Ananya very maturely understands Kabir's side and accepts his love and promises to be with him forever. Meanwhile, Shreya also narrates their marriage story to Ananya's mother but altering few details and keeping Kabir at fault and poisoning her mind that Kabir was always hesitant to commit to her. To which Ananya's mother questions Kabir and asks him to get engaged with Ananya if he truly loves her, which he accepts. It is revealed that Shreya is lonely, so she comes back to India to again continue her lost relationship with Kabir. But by this time, Kabir had moved on with Ananya. Shreya teams up with Maanav luring him for the position of Co-Editor-in-chief.

Just a day before their engagement, a bomb scare incident occurs in which a bomb jacket is tied to Ananya and is aired live on the news channel. Seeing Kabir standing strong by her side even in time of death, Ananya's mother realizes her mistake of not trusting Kabir. After the bomb is defused, the next day, Ananya and Kabir get engaged with the happy consent of her mother. Hreya also lands up in their engagement from realizing that Ananya is Sudhir Kashyap's daughter and knows the truth about her father. Soon, Malvika resigns (for personal development).

It is later revealed that RG was responsible for Ananya's father's death and, abir all the while, knew the truth about Ananya's father's death, to which she broke her engagement with Kabir. Kabir had hidden this truth, fearing for the life of his brother Rajveer's son, who had once been kidnapped by the RG, forcing Kabir to unfollow this case. RG and Shreya team up to kill Ananya and Kabir. In all this conspiracy, Ronnie gets killed instead and Maanav realizes that this game is way more dangerous and gets scared. It is later revealed, after an investigation by Kabir, his colleagues and his stringer, that Shreya suffers from split bipolar disorder and is still on medication, which is revealed to the world, and Shreya is fired from KKN. With the help of Maanav, Kabir gets a sting operation done on Shreya and RG and the truth is revealed to the world about the conspiracy against Sudhir Kashyap and served justice. Finally, Kabir and Ananya accept their love for each other and lead a happy life.

== Cast ==
Main

- Rajeev Khandelwal as Kabir Sharma
- Kritika Kamra as Ananya Kashyap
- Ankita Bhargava as Shreya Bhagat
- Bikramjeet Kanwarpal as Khalid
- Sunny Hinduja as Manav Gupta
- Aakash Pandey as Tinu Sharma
- Parvinder Singh Prince as Sunny Gill
- Nikhil Sabharwal as Rohan Singhania
- Megha Chatterjee as Malvika Prasad
- Shivangi Verma as Richa Lakhani
- Divyangana Jain as Baby Malhotra

Recurring

- Pyumori Mehta Ghosh as Mrs. Kashyap, Ananya's mother
- Alam Khan as Armaan Kashyap
- Shivani Manchanda as Ritu Sharma
- Alefia Kapadia as Tarini
- Khushboo Purohit as Trisha Rajput
- Puru Chibber as Ronnie Singh

== Reception ==
Rajyasree Sen of Fir, tpost reviewed negatively saying, "Instead of pretending to be "hard-hitting", maybe it would, be wiser for TV producers to stick to what they're good at – to emoenal ftoly dramas that strike a deadly balance between sexism and over-acting." Daily News and Analysis rated it 3/5 and summarized it as, "Definitely a change from the routine fare on TV, but needs to focus more on news gathering rather than breaking news." Indian Express rated 2/5 saying, "Reporters is all rattling bones with no flesh to sink one's teeth into."
