= Param Gill =

Indian film director

- Born: Moga, Punjab, India
- Occupation(s): Film director Film producer Screenwriter
- Years active: 2009–present

Param Gill is an American film director and writer of Indian origin, known for directing films which tackle diverse themes. He is active in Hollywood and Bollywood film industry and has won numerous awards for his films. His latest film, Going to America, was released by AMC theaters on 28 August 2015 and was distributed on Home Video/VOD by Sony Pictures. Gill received mixed reviews from critics with Atlas and Aeris praising the film but was panned by other critics.

== Career ==
Gill made history, and became first director in the world to premiere his Hollywood film, Last Supper (released in theaters as Going to America), and Bollywood film, Death of Amar, over the same weekend at a film festival in San Francisco . The movies competed against each other and went on to win multiple awards, including best director with a cash prize of US$100,000. Gill was born at Moga, Punjab, and his father was a farmer. He was penniless when he came to United States in May 2001 and worked nights at a gas station in New Jersey. Gill received a joint master's degree from the University of Medicine and Dentistry of New Jersey and the New Jersey Institute of Technology in 2003 and received a diploma in film-making from New York Film Academy in 2005. He practiced dentistry in Modesto and founded Gill Dental Dental Group with multiple locations in Northern California until he completely transitioned to films.

=== Films ===
Gill made his directorial debut in 2009 with the Hollywood film Rockin' Meera', starring Terrence Quaites, Sonu Sood, Nauheed Cyrusi, Debra Wilson and Sayaji Shinde. Although the film was well promoted and had a decent opening at the box office, it failed commercially since it was released only on limited screens. Rockin' Meera collected a million dollars from just about 15 prints spread on 45 screens over a period of 3 months, which was way short of its $1.5 million budget. The film found critical acclaim in the festival circuit and played at Independent Black film festival, South Asian film festival, Sweet Auburn film festival and many others. The movie soundtrack was composed by Will Storkson and Satish-Ajay. The soundtrack featured Sukhwinder Singh, Shaan, Sunidhi Chauhan, Terrence Quaites and Tatyana Ali.

Gill's next movie, Hotel Hollywood, was a dark thriller about a wedding party which checks into a hotel and is not found again. The film opened to average response in North American theaters. Critics gave the following comments: "Terrifying Action and Suspense! I felt wary and fearful for 2 days after watching Hotel Hollywood... Mac Ferguson (Critic). Hotel Hollywood is a Must Watch... Times of India.

Gill's next release was a kung fu epic film Warrior Savitri, featuring an international cast of Om Puri, Lucy Pinder, Tim Man, Ron Smoorenburg, Niharica Raizada and Rajat Barmecha. It is a modern-day adaptation of the legendary fable of Savitri, Satyavaan and Yamaraj from Mahabharata, one of the major Sanskrit epics of ancient India set in sin city, Las Vegas. The film was shot in United States, India and United Kingdom and was released on 22 July 2016. The film was banned in many parts of India for portraying Goddess Savitri as modern 21st century woman. Gill received death threats and the film got a very low key release.

=== Books ===
Gill wrote a book, "How to lose a million dollars and not lose your smile" based on his experiences with the film industry. The book is set for release through Amazon.com.

=== Dentistry ===
Gill founded 'Gill Dental Group' at the heights of recession. He owned a dental practice in Stockton, California, when the recession hit in 2007, and Stockton was declared the foreclosure capital of the country. Most of his patients lost their jobs and associated medical and dental benefits. Gill sensed an opportunity to make a difference and provide dental services for the uninsured. Gill Dental plan was introduced in 2008 and was a big help to the underprivileged and uninsured until it was folded in 2012, once the economy inched back to normal.

== Awards ==
| Award | Film | Event |
|---|---|---|
| Best Director | Last Supper | Los Angeles International Film Festival 2014 |
| Platinum Award | Last Supper | Oregon Film Festival Awards 2014 |
| Best Director | Last Supper | San Francisco Global Movie Fest 2014 |
| Award of Merit | Last Supper | Indie Fest Awards 2014 |
| Audience Choice Award | DOA Death of Amar | San Francisco Global Movie Fest 2014 |
| Platinum Award | Last Supper | International Independent Film Awards 2015 |
| Award of Merit | Last Supper | Accolade Global Film Awards 2015 |
| Winner | Last Supper | American Movie Awards 2015 |

== Filmography ==
| Film | Producer | Release date |
|---|---|---|
| Shell Shocked Hope | Sada Entertainment | June 2006 |
| Rocking Meera | Sada Entertainment | September 2009 |
| Hotel Hollywood | Gurdeep Singh Productions | July 2010 |
| DOA Death of Amar | Remo D'Souza Productions | August 2014 |
| Going to America | Young N Free Films LLC | August 2015 |
| Waarrior Savitri | Dr Bob Productions | July 2016 |
