= Eddie Griffin =

American actor and comedian (born 1968)

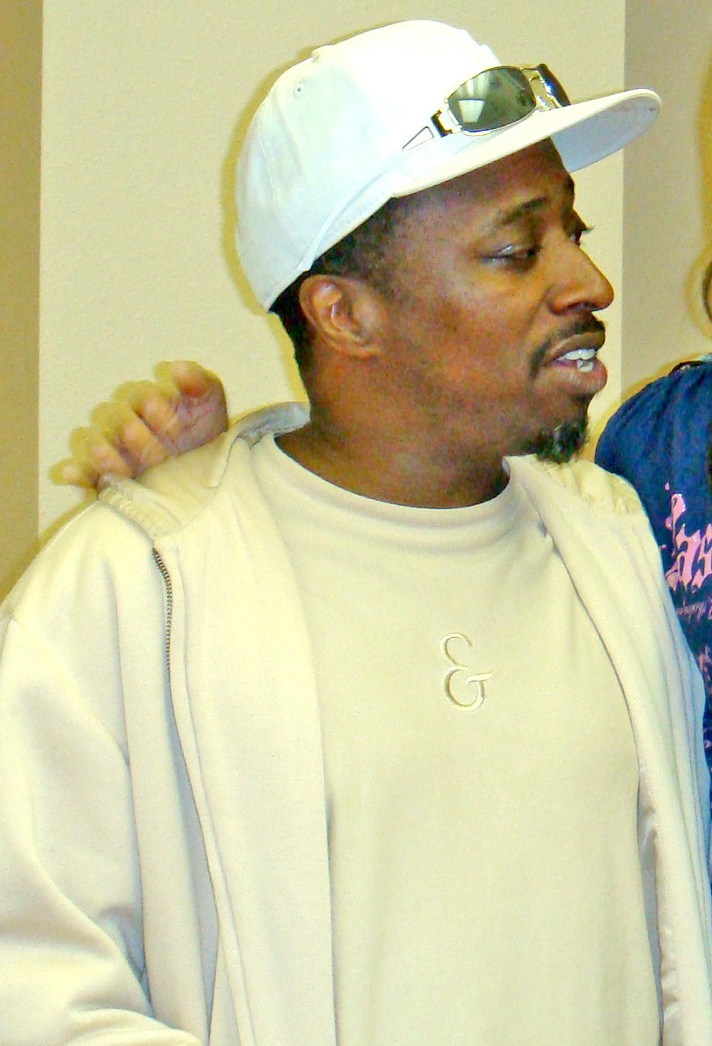
- Griffin in 2008
- Born: Edward Rubin Griffin; July 15, 1968 (age 58); Kansas City, Missouri, U.S.
- Spouses: Carla Griffin (m. 1984; div. 1997) Rochelle Griffin (m. 2002; div. 2009) Nia Rivers (m. 2011; div. 2012) Ko Lee (m. 2017)
- Children: 12

Comedy career
- Years active: 1989–present
- Medium: Stand-up, film, television
- Genres: Improvisational comedy, observational comedy, blue comedy, satire
- Subjects: African-American culture, recreational drug use, human sexuality, race relations, politics, racism, religion, everyday life
- Website: eddiegriffin.com

Edward Rubin Griffin (born July 15, 1968) is an American stand-up comedian and actor. He is best known for portraying Eddie Sherman in the sitcom Malcolm & Eddie, the title character in the 2002 comedy film Undercover Brother, and Tiberius Jefferson "T.J." Hicks in Deuce Bigalow: Male Gigolo (1999) and Deuce Bigalow: European Gigolo (2005). He also portrayed Lester Matthews in John Q. (2002), Orpheus in Scary Movie 3 (2003), Pope Sweet Jesus in Norbit (2007), and voiced Richard Pryor on Black Dynamite (2012–2015). Griffin was ranked at number 62 on Comedy Central's list of the 100 Greatest Stand-Ups of All Time.

== Early life ==
Griffin was born in Kansas City, Missouri, and was raised by his single mother, Doris Thomas, a phone company operator. His family were Jehovah's Witnesses. In 1984, at 16 years old, he moved to Compton, California, to live with his cousins. He later became a father and enlisted in the U.S. Navy but was discharged within months for using marijuana. After six months in jail on an assault conviction following a fight, he made ends meet dancing and painting houses.

== Career ==
At a comedy club open-mic night in 1989, Griffin hopped onstage on a bet and earned a standing ovation with family stories. He talked his way into stand-up gigs around town and in L.A. One popular bit was his gay version of tough-guy comic Andrew Dice Clay, who later hired Griffin to open for him.

Once he achieved success in standup, Griffin became known at The Comedy Store for doing guest sets on open mic nights and staying on stage long enough to tire the audience out for the next comedian.

Griffin has appeared in films such as The Meteor Man (1993), The Walking Dead (1995), David E. Talbert: A Fool & His Money (1997), Deuce Bigalow: Male Gigolo (1999), Double Take (2001), Undercover Brother (2002), John Q (2002), Scary Movie 3 (2003), Deuce Bigalow: European Gigolo (2005), Norbit (2007), and Urban Justice (2007).

Griffin has appeared on television shows such as Malcolm & Eddie (1996–2000) and Chappelle's Show in the skit "World Series of Dice" as Grits n' Gravy. Griffin performed on two tracks from Dr. Dre's 1999 album, 2001, and the intro track from The D.O.C.'s 1996 album Helter Skelter. He has also appeared on commercials for Miller Beer's Man Laws.

In 2011, Comedy Central released Griffin's stand-up comedy special You Can Tell 'Em I Said It on DVD. In December 2019, his stand-up comedy special, E-Niggma, was released on Showtime.

== Personal life ==
Griffin and his mother got into an argument at his 20th birthday party when she accused him of stealing jewelry from her, which Griffin denied doing. Afterward, Griffin did not see his mother for four years until he moved back to Los Angeles, California, in March 1992, to be closer with his family when his mother was injured in a car accident.

Griffin has been married four times. He married his first wife, Carla in 1984 when he was 16 years old. They divorced in 1997. He married his second wife, Rochelle, in 2002 and divorced in 2009. On September 8, 2011, he married his third wife, Nia Rivers. However, they filed for divorce after one month of marriage, citing irreconcilable differences. They were officially divorced six months later in 2012. He married his fourth wife, Ko Lee Griffin, on July 27, 2017, in Las Vegas, Nevada.

In March 2007, Griffin participated in a charity race at Irwindale Speedway to promote the film Redline, using a Ferrari Enzo owned by Daniel Sadek. During a practice run, Griffin accidentally hit the gas pedal instead of the brake and lost control of the Enzo, crashing hard into a concrete barrier. He walked away unscratched, but the $1.5 million supercar was badly damaged. Griffin later criticized reporters who suggested the crash was a publicity stunt.

During the sexual assault allegations on Bill Cosby, Griffin suggested that Cosby was the victim of a conspiracy to destroy his image and claimed, without specification, that several other prominent African-American men had been victims of similar conspiracies. Griffin has also been called out by the Sikh community for referring to an elderly Sikh man as "Osama Bin Laden" in the aftermath of 9/11, despite Osama bin Laden being Muslim and not Sikh. Such comments were believed to have helped fuel the rising hate crime rates against both groups.

In October 2024, Griffin stated that he would likely vote for Donald Trump in the 2024 United States presidential election. He said, referring to Kamala Harris, "Everybody I talk to don't like you. Ain't nobody gonna vote for you."

== Filmography ==
=== Film ===
Year	Title	Role	Notes
1991	Dice Rules	Gas Station Attendant	
1991	The Last Boy Scout	Club DJ	
1992	Brain Donors	Messenger	
1993	Coneheads	Customer	
1993	The Meteor Man	Michael Anderson	
1994	The Legend of Dolemite	Himself	
1994	House Party 3	Guest at Kid's Bachelor Party	
1994	Jason's Lyric	Rat	
1995	The Walking Dead	Pvt. Hoover Brache	
1998	Armageddon	Bike Messenger	
1999	Deuce Bigalow: Male Gigolo	Tiberius Jefferson "T.J." Hicks	
1999	The Mod Squad	Sonny	
1999	Foolish	Miles "Foolish" Waise	
2000	All Jokes Aside	Himself	
2000	Picking Up the Pieces	Sediento	
2001	Double Take	Freddy Tiffany	
2002	John Q.	Lester Matthews	
2002	The New Guy	Luther	
2002	Undercover Brother	Anton Jackson/Undercover Brother	
2002	Pinocchio	The Cat (voice)	
2003	Dysfunktional Family	Himself	
2003	Scary Movie 3	Orpheus	
2004	My Baby's Daddy	Lonnie	
2004	Blast	Lamont Dixon	
2004	Pryor Offenses	Richard Pryor	TV movie
2005	The Wendell Baker Story	McTeague	
2005	Deuce Bigalow: European Gigolo	Tiberius Jefferson "T.J." Hicks	
2006	Date Movie	Frank Jones	
2006	Irish Jam	James "Jimmy Da Jam" McDevitt	
2006	Who Made the Potatoe Salad?	Malik	
2006	The Year Without a Santa Claus	Jingle	TV movie
2007	Norbit	Pope Sweet Jesus	
2007	Redline	Infamous	
2007	Urban Justice	Armand Tucker	Video
2008	Beethoven's Big Break	Stanley Mitchell	Video
2012	ATypical Love	Sweet Jimmy	
2012	Highway	Redneck Trucker	
2013	How Sweet It Is	Ronnie	
2014	The Slimbones	K-Kutta	
2014	Going to America	Fumnanya	
2015	American Hero	Lucille	
2017	All About the Money	Christopher Jefferson Johnson	
2018	A Star Is Born	Pastor	
2020	The Comeback Trail	Devon	
2020	Bad President	The Devil	
2023	All You Need Is Blood	Detective Moses T. Swan	
2025	Raging Midlife	El Duque	

=== Television ===
Year	Title	Role	Notes
1992	One Night Stand	Himself	Episode: "Eddie Griffin"
1992	Just for Laughs	Himself	Episode: "Episode #7.0"
1992	Def Comedy Jam	Himself	Episode: "Episode #1.8"
1993	Roc	Al	Episode: "Labor Intensive"
1994	HBO Comedy Half-Hour	Himself	Episode: "Eddie Griffin"
1996–2000	Malcolm & Eddie	Eddie Sherman	Main Cast
1999	Hollywood Squares	Himself/Panelist	Recurring Guest
2003	Punk'd	Himself	Episode: "Episode #1.1"
2003	The Osbournes	Himself	Episode: "The Osbourne Family Christmas Special"
2004	Celebrity Blackjack	Himself	Episode: "Tournament 1, Game 3"
2004	Chappelle's Show	Grits N' Gravy	Episode: "World Series of Dice & Mooney on Movies"
2005	Independent Lens	Himself/Narrator	Episode: "Parliament Funkadelic: One Nation Under a Groove"
2005	Reel Comedy	Himself	Episode: "Deuce Bigalow European Gigolo"
2005	Comedy Central Roast	Himself/Roaster	Episode: "Comedy Central Roast of Pamela Anderson"
2008	Black Poker Stars Invitational	Himself	Main Guest
2009	Eddie Griffin: Going for Broke	Himself	Main Cast
2011	Comedy All-Stars	Himself	Episode: "Eddie Griffin"
2012	Black Dynamite	Richard Pryor (voice)	Episode: "Taxes and Death or Get Him to the Sunset Strip"
2014	The Boondocks	Himself (voice)	Episode: "Good Times"
2017	The Comedy Get Down	Himself	Main Cast
2020	This Is Stand-Up	Himself	Episode: "Episode #1.2"
2020	The Comedy Store	Himself	Recurring Guest
2020–22	Woke	40 Oz. Bottles (voice)	Recurring Cast: Season 1, Guest: Season 2
2021	Dark Humor	Himself	Recurring Guest
2022–23	Criss Angel's Magic with the Stars	Himself/Host	Main Host

=== Music video appearances ===
Year	Artist	Song
1993	Snoop Dogg featuring Daz Dillinger, Heney Loc & Jewell	"Gin & Juice"
1997	Mariah Carey	"Honey"
1997	Puff Daddy featuring Mase	"Can't Nobody Hold Me Down"
1999	Magic, Master P & Mo B. Dick (musician)	"Foolish (Master P song)"
2001	Lil' Bow Wow featuring Fundisha	"Take Ya Home"

=== Comedy specials ===
Year	Title
1997	Eddie Griffin: Voodoo Child
2003	Eddie Griffin: Dysfunktional Family
2008	Eddie Griffin: Freedom of Speech
2011	Eddie Griffin: You Can Tell 'Em I Said It!
2018	Eddie Griffin: Undeniable
2019	Eddie Griffin: E-Niggma

=== Documentary ===
Year	Title
2007	I'm Rick James

== Discography ==
=== Live albums ===
Title	Album details
Message in the Hat	Released: July 27, 1993; Label: Epic; Formats: CD, digital download, LP
The Message	Released: March 29, 1999; Label: Warner Bros.; Formats: CD, digital download, LP
Freedom Of Speech	Released: April 24, 2008; Label: Comedy Central/CodeBlack; Formats: digital download|-
You Can Tell 'Em I Said It	Released: February 22, 2011; Label: Comedy Central; Formats: digital download

=== Soundtrack albums ===
Title	Album details	Peak chart positions		Certifications
Title	Album details	US	US R&B	Certifications
Foolish (with various artists)	Released: March 23, 1999; Label: No Limit Records/Priority Records; Format: CD, digital download, LP	32	10	RIAA: Gold

=== Album appearances ===
- 1996 "Intro" (from The D.O.C. album Helter Skelter)
- 1998 "DP Gangsta" (from Snoop Dogg & C-Murder album Da Game Is to Be Sold, Not to Be Told)
- 1999 "Bar One" (with Traci Nelson and Ms. Roq) (from Dr. Dre album 2001)
- 1999 "Ed-ucation" (from Dr. Dre album 2001)
- 2002 "Bitch Ass Niggaz" (from Xzibit album Man vs. Machine)
- 2003 "I Thought U Knew" (with Crooked I, Eastwood & The Dramatics album Dysfunktional Family) (Various artists)
- 2003 "Dys-Funk-Tional" (from Spider Loc & Eddie Griffin album Dysfunktional Family) (Various artists)
- 2008 "Take A Ride Skit" & "Feed The Lions Skit" (from T-Pain album Thr33 Ringz)

== Awards ==
Award	Film	Event
Best Actor	Last Supper	Los Angeles International Film Festival 2014
Best Actor	Last Supper	San Francisco Global Movie Fest 2014
