= Gabriel (2014 film) =

- Directed by: Lou Howe
- Written by: Lou Howe
- Story by: Lou Howe
- Produced by: Luca Borghese; Ben Howe
- Starring: Rory Culkin; David Call; Deirdre O'Connell; Lynn Cohen
- Cinematography: Wyatt Garfield
- Edited by: Jane Rizzo
- Music by: Patrick Higgins
- Production company: AgX
- Distributed by: Oscilloscope
- Release dates: April 17, 2014 (Tribeca); June 19, 2015 (United States)
- Running time: 85 minutes
- Country: United States
- Language: English

Gabriel is a 2014 Independent psychological thriller drama film written and directed by Lou Howe and starring Rory Culkin. It is Howe's directorial debut.

== Plot ==
A troubled young man searches obsessively for his first love, risking everything in an increasingly desperate pursuit.

== Cast ==
- Rory Culkin as Gabriel
- Deirdre O'Connell as Meredith
- David Call as Matthew
- Emily Meade as Alice
- Lynn Cohen as Nonny
- Louisa Krause as Sarah
- Alexia Rasmussen as Kelly
- Frank De Julio as Paul
- Desmin Borges as Rudy
- Seán Cullen as Jonathan Norton

== Reception ==
The film has an 84% rating on Rotten Tomatoes. Eric Kohn of IndieWire graded the film a B+. Matt Zoller Seitz of RogerEbert.com awarded the film three stars. Mike D'Angelo of The A.V. Club graded the film a B. Clayton Dillard of Slant Magazine awarded the film one and a half stars out of four.
