= Joyride (1997 film) =

- Theatrical release poster
- Directed by: Quinton Peeples
- Written by: Quinton Peeples
- Produced by: Jon Juhlin; Laurent Zilber
- Starring: Tobey Maguire; Amy Hathaway; Wilson Cruz; Christina Naify; Adam West; Benicio Del Toro
- Cinematography: S. Douglas Smith
- Edited by: Cindy Parisotto
- Distributed by: Live Entertainment
- Release date: November 18, 1997
- Running time: 93 minutes
- Country: United States
- Language: English

Joyride is a 1997 American film directed by Quinton Peeples.

== Plot summary ==
J.T., the bored slacker son of a motel owner, begins flirting with a visitor of the motel named Tanya, an aspiring model. James, J.T.'s best friend, gets drunk with J.T. and eventually steals the car of a motel visitor named Ms. Smith (played by Christine Naify) . J.T., Tanya, and James drive around their dead-end town laughing and enjoying the night. They soon find a body in the trunk of the stolen car. J.T. and Tanya dump the body of the person in the lake. The body belonged to the town's doctor. It is revealed that Ms. Smith killed the doctor and is a professional assassin. They logically conclude that the car will not be reported stolen so J.T. decides to keep it. Later, two local bullies who harassed James and J.T. start destroying the car. Tanya gets the bully's baseball bat and they start kicking and beating them out of anger. The next day, the cops find the body and visit J.T.. Ms. Smith vouches and helps them evade suspicion from the detectives. She then threatens the lives of their families if her car is not returned that night. Later, she kills a man who attempted to rape Tanya, and gets a photo of her at the crime scene, which could incriminate her. J.T. kisses Tanya in the car right before Ms. Smith arrives with James. She then tells Tanya to tie them both up and kill them. She whispers them both instructions to fake their deaths and it was successful. Ms. Smith takes Tanya and the car with her as she leaves. She later tells Tanya that she knew that they were not dead and that it was a test for Tanya that she passed. They destroy the car in an explosion and Tanya becomes her apprentice.

== Cast ==
- Tobey Maguire as J.T.
- Amy Hathaway as Tanya
- Wilson Cruz as James
- Christina Naify as Ms. Smith
- James Karen as The Client
- Adam West as Harold
- Benicio del Toro as Detective Lopez
- Steven Gilborn as Arthur
- J.P. Bumstead as Dr. Brewer
- Kenn Norman as Sheriff Cork
- Judson Mills as Redneck Joey
- Susan Romick as Redneck Joey's Girlfriend
- Marc Robinson as Bobby
- Julie Donatt as Lisa
- Leslie Bartlett as Martina Hirsch
- Kristal Cawagas as Casey

== Soundtrack ==
On November 11, 1997, Warner Bros. Records released the Original Motion Picture Soundtrack for Joyride. The 17 tracks are:

- Light from a Dead Star (Instrumental) - Lush
- Chlorine Dream - Spirea X
- Game Of Broken Hearts - Tarnation
- Cherry Stars Collide - Swallow
- Unbearable Lightness of Bean - Baked Beans
- Human Bean - Baked Beans
- Something Borrowed - This Mortal Coil
- Cannon (Instrumental) - Scheer
- Subsonic Interferences - Oliver Lieb
- Shoot Out - Colourbox
- Breakdown - Michael Brook
- Ivy and Neet - This Mortal Coil
- A Thousand Stars Burst Open - Pale Saints
- Desire Lines - Lush
- Meniscus - This Mortal Coil
- No Motion - Dif Juz
- Home - His Name Is Alive

== Reception ==
On Rotten Tomatoes it has a score of 20% based on reviews from 5 critics.

The A.V. Club called it "A depressingly mediocre little film"

== Home media ==
On September 24, 2002, Artisan Entertainment released Joyride on DVD.
