= Kit Culkin =

American actor (born 1944)

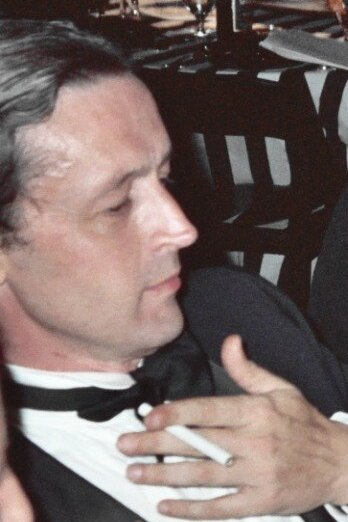
- Culkin in 1991
- Born: Christopher Cornelius Culkin; December 6, 1944 (age 81); New York City, U.S.
- Occupation: Actor
- Years active: 1954–1978
- Partner: Patricia Brentrup (1974–1995)
- Children: 8, including Macaulay, Kieran and Rory
- Relatives: Bonnie Bedelia (sister)

Christopher Cornelius "Kit" Culkin (born December 6, 1944) is an American actor, dancer and the father of actors Macaulay, Rory and Kieran Culkin who all began their careers at a young age. He is best known for managing the careers of his children prior to a highly publicized child custody trial from 1995 to 1997. Like his sons, Culkin also was active as a performer as a child and had several siblings who were performers; including his sister Bonnie Bedelia. He appeared in two productions on Broadway, including Richard Burton's Hamlet which was adapted into a film with Culkin remaining in the part he played on stage. He also performed with the New York City Opera, the Lyric Opera of Chicago, and at the Paper Mill Playhouse during his career. He was also a dancer with the New York City Ballet and appeared in the 1961 film version of the musical West Side Story.

== Early life ==
Culkin was born Christopher Cornelius Culkin on December 6, 1944, in Manhattan, New York City, the son of Philip Harley Culkin (1898–1977), who was in public relations, and Marian Ethel (née Wagner; 1914–1964). He and his younger sisters Candice and Bonnie and his younger brother Terry were raised in New York City. The family experienced financial hardship when his father's firm went bankrupt, and the family lived in a cold water flat.

For middle school, Culkin attended Saint Thomas Choir School in Midtown Manhattan. He and his sister Bonnie took classes at School of American Ballet (as did his son Macaulay in the late 1980s).

== Career ==
Kit Culkin began his career performing as an actor in commercials at the age of 10. He was born into a family of entertainers with he and several of his siblings working as child performers. His sister Candace Culkin was Patty Duke's understudy for the role of Helen Keller in the original Broadway production of The Miracle Worker, and also appeared on-stage as one of the students at the Perkins Institute of the Blind. Candace performed in several Off-Broadway plays; portrayed Jigee in the 1961 broadcast of the television play A Clearing in the Woods in the anthology series The Play of the Week; had guest starring parts of the television series East Side West Side; and appeared in the film Up the Down Staircase (1967).

Kit's brother Terry Culkin portrayed Willie Maurrant in Kurt Weill's Street Scene at the Lyric Opera of Chicago and New York City Opera (NYCO) in 1960; a production which also featured Kit in the part of Charlie Hildebrand when he 15 years old. His other sister Bonnie Bedelia Culkin (later known as an adult as actress Bonnie Bedelia) also began her career as a child performer at the NYCO. Bonnie had a role as a teenager on the soap opera Love of Life, and has maintained a substantial career as an actress, including starring in the Die Hard film franchise.

In 1959, Kit had a supporting role in the musical Fanny at the Paper Mill Playhouse. In 1960, he had a lead role in the religious film Treasure of Bethany which was made in Detroit by and for the National Council of Churches. That same year he made his Broadway debut at the St. James Theatre as Henry's younger son in Jean Anouilh's Becket with Laurence Olivier in the title role and Anthony Quinn as his character's father, King Henry II. He returned to Broadway in 1964 as the Player Queen in the Lunt-Fontanne Theatre's production of William Shakespeare's Hamlet with Richard Burton in the title role, Alfred Drake as Claudius, John Gielgud as the Ghost, and Linda Marsh as Ophelia. This production was filmed as Richard Burton's Hamlet with Culkin in the cast. He subsequently performed in Hamlet at the Pabst Theater in 1965 with John Cullum in the title role.

Culkin also played the role of a dancer in the original West Side Story film in 1961, and performed in George Balanchine's production of The Nutcracker by the New York City Ballet. In 1978, he toured as a leading actor in productions of Hamlet, Macbeth, and Romeo and Juliet with the South Carolina Theatre Company which presented those plays at colleges, universities, and high schools.

== Family life and parent-manager ==
In the early 1970s, Culkin was a struggling aspiring actor in California, and was at that time living out of a tent. In 1974 he decided to return to New York City, and while driving cross-country through Wyoming he met Patricia "Pat" Brentrup with whom he began a romantic relationship. Pat left her job in construction and came with him back to Manhattan where Kit continued unsuccessfully to make a career as an actor. He joined the staff of St. Joseph Church as a sacristan.

By the late 1980s, Kit had eight children. The oldest, Jennifer Adamson, was with Adeena VanWagoner; his other children, with Patricia Brentrup, were: Shane, Dakota, Macaulay, Kieran, Quinn, Christian, and Rory. Culkin and Brentrup were together for 21 years (from 1974 to 1995), but never married. Three of their sons — Macaulay, Rory, and Kieran — are professional actors whose careers he managed from the late 1980s to the mid-1990s. Macaulay became popular due to his starring roles in the Home Alone films, and he was the first child in Hollywood to receive a million-dollar salary (for My Girl in 1991). Kit Culkin had quit his job to manage Macaulay's career. From 1995 to 1997, Kit was part of a bitter child custody trial. Jennifer Adamson died in 2000 from a drug overdose. On December 9, 2008, Dakota Culkin was struck by a vehicle when she stepped off a curb into its path. She was taken to the Ronald Reagan UCLA Medical Center, where she died of her injuries the following afternoon, at the age of 29.

Culkin has been almost entirely estranged from his children since 1997. In a 2021 interview with Hollywood Reporter, Kieran Culkin stated Kit was not physically or emotionally abusive towards him, unlike Macaulay who claimed such abuse. Kieran nonetheless said Kit was "not a good person [and] probably not a good parent" and had erratic behavior and long absences from his family. Kieran added he had not seen or spoken to Kit since 2014 after Kit suffered a major stroke.

== Later life ==
Culkin resided for many years in Grants Pass, Oregon. After his long-time friend and partner Jeanette Krylowski died on May 31, 2017, Culkin left his Grants Pass residence.

== Filmography ==
=== Film ===
| Year | Film | Role | Notes |
|---|---|---|---|
| 1960 | Treasure of Bethany | | |
| 1961 | West Side Story | Dancer | |

=== Theatre ===
| Year | Film | Role | Notes |
|---|---|---|---|
| 1959 | Fanny | | Paper Mill Playhouse |
| 1960 | Becket | Henry's younger son | St. James Theatre |
| 1964, 1965 | Hamlet | Player Queen | Lunt-Fontanne Theatre, Pabst Theater |
| 1978 | Hamlet | | South Carolina Theatre Company |
| 1978 | Macbeth | | South Carolina Theatre Company |
| 1978 | Romeo and Juliet | | South Carolina Theatre Company |

== Notes and references ==
=== Bibliography ===
- Wallner, Rosemary (1993). Macaulay Culkin: Child Movie Star. Abdo Group. ISBN 978-1562392277.
