= Soundtrack (film) =

- Directed by: Neerav Ghosh
- Written by: Neerav Ghosh; Rajiv Gopalakrishnan; Chintan Gandhi
- Based on: It's All Gone Pete Tong by Michael Dowse
- Produced by: Sanjiv Goenka; Apurv Nagpal
- Starring: Rajeev Khandelwal; Soha Ali Khan; Mrinalini Sharma
- Cinematography: Anshuman Mahaley
- Edited by: Sanjey Roderick; Ambar Vyas
- Music by: Midival Punditz; Karsh Kale
- Production company: Saregama India Limited
- Release date: 7 October 2011
- Running time: 132 minutes
- Country: India
- Language: Hindi

Soundtrack is a 2011 Indian Hindi-language drama film and an official remake of the British-Canadian film It's All Gone Pete Tong (2004). It was directed by newcomer Neerav Ghosh and stars Rajeev Khandelwal and Soha Ali Khan.

== Plot ==
Raunak Kaul (Rajeev Khandelwal) lives, eats and breathes music, having inherited the talent and passion from his deceased father Parth Kaul, who was an unsuccessful musician. He arrives in Mumbai, and starts as a DJ in his uncle Surendra's (Yatin Karyekar) night club Tango Charlie, owned by Charlie (Mohan Kapoor). Raunak soon finds himself expanding his avenues to establishing his own studio, making his own music and composing the score for a movie by Anurag Kashyap.

Raunak starts to lose his hearing, first apparent when he hears a high-pitched ringing sound instead of his interview on TV. At this time, Raunak is making his next album with his mates Banjo (Ankur Tewari) and Biscuit (Siddharth Coutto). Raunak continues working and playing gigs at clubs, but his hearing degrades rapidly and progress on his album stagnates. Raunak refuses to acknowledge his problem until a gig in the club, when he cannot hear the second channel in his headphones and must crossfade one song into the next without being able to beatmatch them. The crowd boos him, and he throws the turntable and the mixer onto the dance floor, and is forcibly removed from the club. Raunak agrees to see a doctor (Manu Rishi), who tells him he's lost hearing in one ear and has 30% left in the other. He warns Raunak that unless he stops abusing drugs and listening to loud noises, he will soon be completely deaf.

During a recording session, Raunak confesses the full nature of his hearing loss to Banjo. He inserts his hearing aid to demonstrate, and, overwhelmed by the sudden sound exposure, leans close to one of the monitor speakers. Before he can react, however, a frustrated Biscuit smashes a guitar into an amplifier whose volume is maximized. The noise is excruciating, and the feedback knocks Raunak unconscious. The damage leaves him permanently deaf.

Without his hearing, Raunak cannot complete his album. He loses his recording contract, and Charlie abandons him. Soon after, Shonali leaves him. He falls into deep depression, repeatedly throwing his body against the walls. Raunak flushes all his drugs down a toilet, only to be faced with the vision of a menacing badger. Raunak fights and kills it, and removes the badger's head to reveal that the badger is, in fact, himself.

Raunak meets Gauri (Soha Ali Khan), an instructor for the deaf who coaches him in lip-reading. They become close, and eventually intimate. He confides his unhappiness at losing music, and she helps him perceive sound through visual and tactile methods instead. Raunak devises a system for mixing songs, in which he watches an oscilloscope trace while resting his feet on the pulsating speakers, managing to produce new mix CD (Raunak Is "Hear") entirely by himself. He delivers it to Charlie, who is wildly pleased – particularly by the potential of using Raunak's disability to increase record sales.

Charlie convinces Raunak to play live as a career comeback, despite Raunak's insistence that he has nothing to prove to his critics. The gig goes exceedingly well, and many claim it showcases even greater talent than his early work. After the show, Raunak and Gauri disappear from Charlie, the media, and the music scene altogether. In a talking heads sequence, characters speculate on where he is now (if alive). As the film ends, we see Raunak teaching a group of deaf children how to perceive sound like he does. He keeps sending a CD of his compositions to Charlie every 6–8 months. Additionally, Raunak is seen who is then met by Gauri and a child (presumably their own). They affectionately walk together down a street unrecognized.

== Cast ==
- Rajeev Khandelwal as Raunak Kaul
- Soha Ali Khan as Gauri
- Mrinalini Sharma as Shonali
- Mohan Kapoor as Charandeep S. Dhingra a.k.a. Charlie
- Yatin Karyekar as Surinder Bhan (Raunak's uncle)
- Ankur Tewari as Banjo
- Siddharth Coutto as Biscuit
- Manu Rishi as Dr. M.R. Chadha
- Anurag Kashyap as himself

=== Cameo appearances in narration parts ===
- Kailash Kher
- Bani J
- DJ Aqeel
- Salim Merchant
- Anu Malik

== Music ==
| No. | Title | Singer(s) | Length |
|---|---|---|---|
| 1. | "Symphony of the streets" (Instrumental) |
| 2. | "What the F" | Anushka Manchanda |
| 3. | "Mein Chala" | Kailash Kher |
| 4. | "Ek Manzil" | Vishal Vaid |
| 5. | "Ruk Jaana Nahin" | Suraj Jagan |
| 6. | "Jannat" | Ankur Tewari |
| 7. | "Banao" | Angarag Papon Mahanta |
| 8. | "Naina Laagey" | Angarag Papon Mahanta |
| 9. | "Yeh Jeevan Hai" | Malini Awasthi |
| 10. | "Fakira" | Vishal Vaid |
| 11. | "Atomizer" | Gaurav Raina, Karsh Kale |
| 12. | "The Soundtrack theme" (Instrumental) |

== Reception ==
Taran Adarsh of Bollywood Hungama gave the film 3 out of 5, writing, "On the whole, SOUNDTRACK captivates you with a story that talks of the triumph of the human spirit. An inspiring film, a human story, a relatable and credible journey with an atypical, feel-good conclusion." Shaikh Ayaz of Rediff.com gave the film 3 out of 5, writing, "Soundtrack is a watchable film, with able support from its cast and if Ghosh is to be credited for anything, let it be said that he has an eye for his material and knows where to look."

Conversely, Sanjukta Sharma of Mint wrote, "Soundtrack is a downer, but for a few powerful scenes—all of which are exact replicas from the movie it's inspired from."

== See also ==
- List of films featuring the deaf and hard of hearing
