= Hick (film) =

2011 film by Derick Martini

- Theatrical release poster
- Directed by: Derick Martini
- Screenplay by: Andrea Portes
- Based on: Hick by Andrea Portes
- Produced by: Steven Siebert; Christian Taylor; Charles de Portes; Jon Cornick
- Starring: Chloë Grace Moretz; Eddie Redmayne; Rory Culkin; Juliette Lewis; Ray McKinnon; Anson Mount; Blake Lively; Alec Baldwin
- Cinematography: Frank Godwin
- Edited by: Mark Yoshikawa
- Music by: Larry Campbell
- Production companies: Stone River Productions; Lighthouse Entertainment; Taylor Lane Productions
- Distributed by: Phase 4 Films
- Release dates: September 10, 2011 (TIFF); May 11, 2012 (United States)
- Running time: 99 minutes
- Country: United States
- Language: English
- Budget: $6 million

Hick is a 2011 American coming-of-age comedy-drama film directed by Derick Martini from a screenplay by Andrea Portes, based on Portes' 2007 novel of the same name. The film stars Chloë Grace Moretz, Eddie Redmayne, Rory Culkin, Juliette Lewis, Ray McKinnon, Anson Mount, Blake Lively, and Alec Baldwin. It follows Luli (Moretz), a 13-year-old Nebraskan girl who runs away from her neglectful parents and sets out for Las Vegas. Along the way, she meets a drifter (Redmayne) and a troubled young woman (Lively).

The film had its world premiere at the Toronto International Film Festival on September 10, 2011. It was released in the United States by Phase 4 Films on video on demand on May 8, 2012, and in select theaters on May 11.

== Plot ==
In the 1980s, Luli McMullen lives in Palmyra, Nebraska, with her neglectful mother and alcoholic father, who constantly fight. On her 13th birthday, she receives a revolver as a gift. Her mother suddenly takes off with Luxe Feld, and her father also leaves after he hears of this news. One day, Luli sees a television commercial for Las Vegas and decides to run away there. She hitches a ride from Eddie, an erratic drifter with a limp. They argue and she leaves his truck. She eventually convinces another passerby, Glenda, to give her a ride. They bond after Luli helps Glenda rob a convenience store and spend the night in a trailer behind a bowling alley, where a little boy named Angel, who is seemingly under Glenda's care, lives. Luli encounters Eddie again that night in the parking lot of the bowling alley.

The next day, Glenda takes Luli to the house she shares with her husband, Lloyd. Luli discovers that Eddie works for Lloyd as a bartender and that Glenda knows Eddie and is upset to see him. While Lloyd initially appears friendly, his true nature shows through when he viciously berates Eddie for a small mistake. Luli makes peace with Eddie, and he takes her to a local bar so Glenda and Lloyd can be alone. Eddie is interrupted by Luli while hustling pool, and when his hustle fails, the man that he was hustling makes a deal with Eddie. The man then follows Luli into the bathroom and tries to rape her. She fights him before Eddie comes in and savagely beats the man to death.

As they leave the bar, Eddie claims that Glenda has asked him to take Luli to a motel to meet Glenda because she got in a fight with Lloyd. At the motel, Eddie tells Luli that Glenda actually paid him $1,000 to take her off Glenda's hands. Heartbroken by this revelation and unnerved by Eddie's odd behavior, Luli goes outside, where she meets a boy named Clement and enjoys a drinking game with him. Eddie interrupts them in a drunken outburst, and the two leave the motel. When Eddie insinuates he has fallen in love with Luli, she tells him she will never love him back and asks him to pull over, leaving the truck despite Eddie begging her to stay. As she walks away, Eddie exits the truck and chases Luli into a cornfield, where he rapes her.

The next day, Luli awakens to find herself tied to a bed in a rented cabin, her hair cut short and dyed black. Eddie arrives and unties her, promising to take care of her. They are interrupted by the proprietor, Beau, who briefly talks with both of them and leaves. The next day, Luli, tied up again, awakens to find Glenda in the room. Glenda reveals that Eddie used to be her lover and Angel is their son; she eventually ran away with Angel, fearing what Eddie was capable of. Glenda also denies giving Eddie any money and insists she has been looking for Luli since she disappeared. Glenda unties Luli, but Eddie soon walks in and accidentally shoots Glenda dead with Luli's revolver. Luli picks up the gun and kills Eddie before collapsing.

Luli awakens in Beau's house, and he assures her that he can make it look like Glenda and Eddie killed each other and Luli was never there. He tells Luli about his sister who lives in Los Angeles and who always wanted a daughter, suggesting that Luli contact her, but she declines the offer. Beau drives Luli to the bus station. She phones home and learns from her mother that she sold their land to a property developer and that Luli's father has left the family. Disillusioned about returning home, Luli hangs up the phone and cries. On the bus to Nebraska, she flips through her sketchbook of drawings and finds a note from Beau containing his sister's home address, in case she changes her mind. Deciding to take up Beau's offer to be adopted by his sister, Luli gets off the bus, races back to the station, and happily boards the next bus to Los Angeles.

== Cast ==
- Chloë Grace Moretz as Luli McMullen
- Eddie Redmayne as Eddie Kreezer
- Juliette Lewis as Tammy Cutter-McMullen
- Rory Culkin as Clement
- Ray McKinnon as Lloyd
- Anson Mount as Nick McMullen
- Robert Baker as Ray
- Robert J. Stephenson as Lux
- Shaun Sipos as Blane
- Blake Lively as Glenda
- Alec Baldwin as Beau
- Leon Lemar as the clerk
- Dartanian Sloan as Angel
- David Allen Vescio as the stranger

== Production ==
It was announced in June 2010 that Chloë Grace Moretz would star in a film adaptation of Andrea Portes' 2007 coming-of-age novel Hick, with Derick Martini set to direct from a screenplay by Portes. In November, Kirsten Dunst joined the cast. Blake Lively and Eddie Redmayne were added to the cast in February 2011, with Lively replacing Dunst. The following month, Juliette Lewis was cast in the film, with Alec Baldwin, Rory Culkin, and Ray McKinnon rounding out the cast in May.

Principal photography began in the last week of March 2011 and lasted approximately 30 days, with filming taking place in 11 cities in North Carolina, including Whiteville, Hallsboro, Kelly, Burgaw, Atkinson, Lexington, Madison, Concord, Winnabow, Lake Waccamaw, and Wilmington.

== Release ==
Hick had its world premiere at the Toronto International Film Festival on September 10, 2011. In November 2011, Phase 4 Films acquired US and Canadian distribution rights to the film. It was released in the United States on video on demand on May 8, 2012, and in select theaters on May 11.

== Reception ==
Although the novel was a bestseller, Hick was almost universally panned by critics. On the review aggregator website Rotten Tomatoes, the film holds an approval rating of 5% based on 22 reviews, with an average rating of 3.1/10. The website's critics consensus reads, "Hick's talented young star is ill served by a film whose story wavers between discomfitingly inappropriate and simply muddled." Metacritic, which uses a weighted average, assigned the film a score of 28 out of 100, based on 10 critics, indicating "generally unfavorable" reviews.
