= Dysfunktional Family =

- Theatrical release poster
- Directed by: George Gallo
- Written by: Eddie Griffin
- Produced by: Eddie Griffin; David Permut; Paul Brooks
- Starring: Eddie Griffin
- Cinematography: Theo van de Sande
- Edited by: Michael R. Miller
- Music by: Andrew Gross
- Production company: Gold Circle Films
- Distributed by: Miramax Films
- Release date: April 4, 2003
- Running time: 89 minutes
- Country: United States
- Language: English
- Budget: $3 million
- Box office: $2.2 million

Dysfunktional Family is an American documentary and stand-up comedy concert film written, produced and starring comedian Eddie Griffin, and directed by George Gallo. It was released to theaters by Miramax Films on April 4, 2003 and stayed in theaters until May 18, 2003. The film earned $2,255,000 with its widest release being in 602 theaters. Dysfunktional Family is mainly a concert performance featuring Eddie Griffin filmed live at the Star Plaza Theatre in Merrillville, Indiana that also includes behind-the-scenes documentary footage filmed in Kansas City, Missouri detailing the stand-up comedian's personal life and family as he travels to a family reunion to reunite with the cast of characters who are the root of his comedy: his mother, an uncle who is an ex-pimp, and his Uncle Curtis, who pontificates on his career as a porno director.

== Soundtrack ==
A soundtrack containing hip hop music was released on March 11, 2003 by the reformed Death Row Records. It peaked at 95 on the Billboard 200 and 14 on the Top R&B/Hip-Hop Albums.

On a separate note, in 2012, a number of lines and quotes from the film were sampled into the rap song "Fair Fight" performed by the group Strong Arm Steady, alongside a sampled quote from Chris Rock's Never Scared comedy show.
