= Andrea Portes =

American novelist

Andrea Portes is a bestselling novelist. Her novels include: Hick, Bury This, Anatomy of a Misfit, The Fall of Butterflies, This is Not a Ghost Story, Liberty, Henry and Eva and The Castle on the Cliff, Henry and Eva and the Famous People Ghosts, and Creeping Beauty.

Portes was raised in rural Nebraska. She later attended Bryn Mawr College. After graduation, Portes moved to the neighborhood of Echo Park in Los Angeles. She has lived ever since on the east side in Echo Park, Silver Lake and Los Feliz.

In 2007, Portes published her debut novel Hick, which was a best seller. The movie adaptation, starring Chloë Grace Moretz, Alec Baldwin, Eddie Redmayne, Juliette Lewis and Blake Lively, premiered at the Toronto International Film Festival in 2011.

== Books ==
- Hick. Unbridled Books. April 15, 2007. ISBN 978-1-932961-32-4.
- Bury This. Catapult. December 31, 2013. ISBN 978-1-59376-535-4.
- Anatomy of a Misfit. Harper Collins. September 2, 2014. ISBN 978-0-06-231366-9.
- The Fall of Butterflies. HarperCollins. May 10, 2016. ISBN 978-0-06-231369-0.
- Liberty: The Spy Who (Kind of) Liked Me. HarperCollins. June 6, 2017. ISBN 978-0-06-242201-9.
- Henry & Eva and the Castle on the Cliff. HarperCollins. November 6, 2018. ISBN 978-0-06-256005-6.
- Henry & Eva and the Famous People Ghosts. HarperCollins. October 8, 2019. ISBN 978-0-06-256007-0.
- Henry and Eva and the Famous People Ghosts. HarperCollins Publishers Limited. October 6, 2020. ISBN 978-0-06-256006-3.
- This Is Not a Ghost Story. HarperCollins. November 17, 2020. ISBN 978-0-06-242246-0.
- Creeping Beauty. HarperCollins. August 22, 2023. ISBN 978-0-06-242249-1.
