= I'm Rick James =

- Directed by: Perry Santos
- Written by: Perry Santos
- Produced by: Perry Santos
- Starring: Rick James; Eddie Griffin; Charlie Murphy; George Clinton; Janice Dickinson
- Cinematography: Hank Baumert Jr. Andrew Parke
- Edited by: Christian Stoehr
- Music by: Levi Ruffin Jr.
- Distributed by: Shoreline Entertainment
- Release date: September 8, 2007
- Running time: 90 minutes
- Country: United States
- Language: English

I'm Rick James is a 2007 documentary film by Perry Santos from Shoreline Entertainment.

== Appearances ==
- Rick James
- Eddie Griffin
- Charlie Murphy
- George Clinton
- Janice Dickinson
- Dave Chappelle
- Darius McCrary
- Ron Jeremy

== Production ==
In a recent radio interview, the director said,

This was one of the most difficult projects I've ever been involved with ... Rick was a complicated guy, with a crazy lifestyle ... most of the people that were involved with him are pretty complicated too. Dozens of interviews were set up where the people just didn't show. We had crews sitting at rented locations or on built sets, for hours waiting for them. Most of the big stars that were really close to Rick, didn't want to be interviewed or participate. I guess they were afraid of revealing their 'party times' with Rick. Even Eddie Murphy wouldn't do an interview for us ... Eddie went back over 20 years with Rick ... But I tell ya, the stories that we got from the ones that did show, are incredible! Some of the stories were too heavy to make the cut, but I'm sure they'll make the bonus materials on the DVD. In the end, it was worth it. You really get an inside look at this guy ... all his talents for making music, his incredible career, all the money he made and blew ... his wild lifestyle ... then losing it all to drugs ... going to jail ... the Dave Chappelle thing ... and just as he starts to get his life back, he checks out. It's quite a story. Eddie Griffin described Rick's life as 'a beautiful tragedy' and that's truly what it was. But three years on the same movie? It just wiped me out.

== See also ==
- Chappelle's Show
