= Salt Bridge (film) =

2015 Indian drama film by Abhijit Deonath

- Directed by: Abhijit Deonath
- Written by: Abhijit Deonath
- Produced by: Abhijit Deonath; Alakananda Deonath
- Starring: Rajeev Khandelwal; Chelsie Preston Crayford; Usha Jadhav
- Cinematography: Miguel Gallagher
- Edited by: Rabiranjan Maitra; Ben Wade
- Music by: Abhijit Deonath
- Release dates: 27 July 2017 (Australia); 4 January 2019 (India)
- Running time: 100 minutes
- Countries: India; Australia
- Language: Hindi

Salt Bridge is an Indian drama film produced and directed by Indian writer and director Abhijit Deonath. It tells the story of a man who left India to live in a small town in Australia, looking for a better future. He befriends an Australian woman. Their friendship, being unorthodox in their community, becomes a problem to other Indian people living in Salt Bridge. The film was released in Australia on 27 July 2017 and in India on 4 January 2019.

== Cast ==
- Rajeev Khandelwal as Basant
- Chelsie Preston Crayford as Madhurima
- Usha Jadhav as Lipi
- Kaushik Das as Shubhro
- Mayur Kamble as Deep
- Adam Grant as John
- Asim Das as Shantanu

== Plot ==
Basant is the newest migrant in Salt Bridge, which already houses a small Indian community. He lives a happy, frictionless life with his wife and son, until he befriends Madhurima, a married woman. The friendship that starts between the two is highly questionable to the Indian community living in Salt Bridge.
