= Rajeev Khandelwal =

Indian actor (born 16 October 1975)

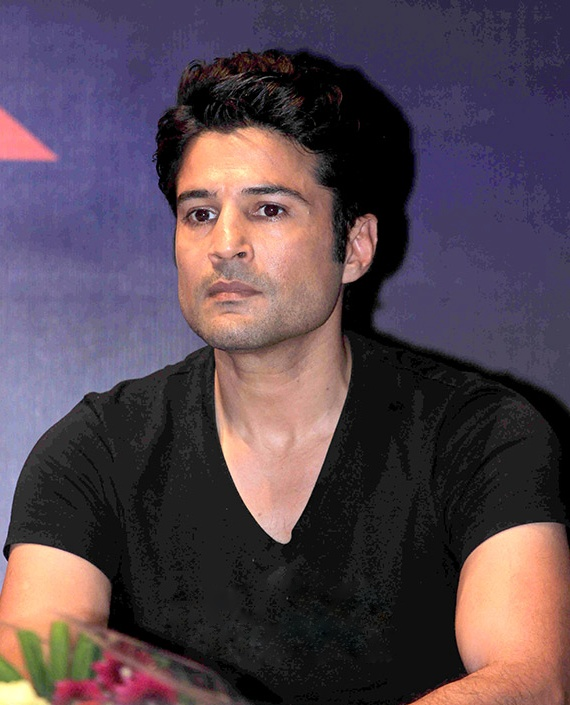
- Khandelwal in 2016
- Born: 16 October 1975 (age 51); Jaipur, Rajasthan, India
- Education: St. Xavier's College, Ahmedabad
- Occupations: Actor; host; singer
- Years active: 1998–present
- Known for: Kahiin to Hoga
- Spouse: Manjiri Kamtikar (m. 2011)
- Children: 1

Rajeev Khandelwal (born 16 October 1975) is an Indian film and television actor, singer and host.

He started his career directing the television series Filmy Chakkar. His break as an actor was as the lead in the television drama, Kahiin To Hoga (2003-2005). After this he acted in many television shows which include Time Bomb 9/11 (2005), Sun Leyna (2006), Left Right Left (2007), and Reporters (2015). In 2008, he made his Bollywood debut with the film Aamir which proved to be a turning point in his career. After this he became part of many films like Shaitan (2011), Soundtrack (2011), Table No.21 (2013), Samrat & Co (2015) among others. Khandelwal made his web series debut in 2018 with ALTBalaji's Haq Se. In 2019, he appeared in another ALTBalaji web series Coldd Lassi Aur Chicken Masala opposite Divyanka Tripathi.

Apart from acting he has hosted many reality shows, including Deal Ya No Deal, Sacch Ka Saamna, Super Cars and My Endeavour. In 2015, he returned to television with Sony TV's show Reporters with Kritika Kamra. In 2018, he hosted Zee TV's talk show Juzzbaatt.

== Life and family ==
Khandelwal belongs to Kalandri, a town situated in Sirohi district of Rajasthan. He was born on 16 October 1975 in Jaipur, Rajasthan, India in a Marwari family. He is the second son of Lt. Col. C.L. Khandelwal (retired) and Mrs Vijay Laxmi Khandelwal. His elder brother is Sanjeev Khandelwal and Rahul Khandelwal is his younger brother. He did his schooling from Kendriya Vidyalaya, Jaipur. He later earned a Bachelor's degree in Chemistry from St. Xavier's College, Ahmedabad.

In 2007, he adopted a five-year-old girl named Swati from an institute called Muskaan. Khandelwal married his longtime girlfriend Manjiri Kamtikar on 7 February 2011. He has said he is an atheist but he is not against people who follow any religion. He currently lives in Goregaon, Mumbai, Maharashtra, India.

== Career ==
=== 1998–2007: Television debut and success ===
He started working with a Delhi based production house and also modelled for brands like LML, Green Label Whiskey, Videocon and many more. He began his television career with a negative role in the show Kya Hadsaa Kya Haqeeqat (2002). In 2002 he was offered Balaji Telefilms' Kahiin To Hoga, a romantic drama. He portrayed the character of Sujal Garewal who is 6 feet tall, dark handsome and rich, a Mills & Boonish hero and a scorned lover. For portraying Sujal Garewal, he became a recipient of many awards and accolades for Best Debut and Best Actor. In 2005, he was seen as the RAW Field Officer Varun Awasthi in Ketan Mehta's action television series, Time Bomb 9/11. In 2006, he entered C.I.D as ACP Prithviraj and also acted as Sharim in the Pakistani show, Sun Leyna. In 2006-2007 he featured in the youth based drama series, Left Right Left as Captain Rajveer Singh Shikhawat; the character was later killed off. His portrayal of this character received appreciation from audiences as well as critics.

=== 2008–2015: Bollywood and break from television ===
Khandelwal made his Bollywood debut with Ronnie Screwvala's action-thriller Aamir (2008). He was cast as Dr. Aamir Ali, who returns to India from England and becomes the reluctant pawn of a terrorist group. Film critic Taran Adarsh from Bollywood Hungama reviewed "Rajeev Khandelwal is remarkable in the title role. The film would've fallen flat had it been entrusted to an inferior actor, but Rajeev lends the right shades and emerges triumphant. Watch him emote with his eyes in the latter reels mainly, and you realize that he knows the craft so well. An excellent debut!".CNN-IBN's Rajeev Masand added, "Uninhibited, spontaneous and blessed with unmistakable presence, Khandelwal holds the screen like a seasoned artist. Using his face as a canvas to display emotions, he emerges as the biggest strength of this little film." The film grossed ₹18 million (US$190,000) domestically. For his work in the film, he received the nomination of Filmfare Award for Best Male Debut. In 2011, Khandelwal had two film releases. His first appearance was in the Bejoy Nambiar's thriller film Shaitan (2012) co-starring Kalki Koechlin. He played the role of Inspector Arvind Mathur, who is assigned by the Police Commissioner to solve a case unofficially, as he is on suspension after throwing a corporator from the first floor of his own house for allegedly beating up a woman. Taran Adarsh of entertainment portal of Bollywood Hungama wrote of his performance:"Rajeev Khandelwal, playing a cop who's fighting his inner demons, nails the role, giving a tight, focused performance".

Khandelwal was next seen in Sanjiv Goenka's Soundtrack opposite Soha Ali Khan. He played the role of DJ, Raunak [Rajeev Khandelwal], who gets addicted to drugs and alcohol and loses his hearing ability. His career nosedives, but his love for music helps him resurrect himself. Subhash K. Jha of NDTV reviewed "his performance is so accomplished that he proves, not for the first time, that he's among the most engaging actors today. For the money, time and attention, he is the true rock star." Taran Adarsh added "Playing an emotionally unstable character is always taxing and an edgy journey for any actor, but Rajeev emerges triumphant with a bravura performance." The film grossed ₹5.3 million (US$57,000) domestically. Khandelwal next played alongside Shreyas Talpade and Mugdha Godse in the romantic comedy, Will You Marry Me? (2012). However the film did not receive very good reviews. Taran Adarsh praised Khandelwal as:"Rajeev Khandelwal handles his part with gusto." The film grossed ₹0.32 crore (US$34,000) domestically. His next release was the psychological mystery thriller, Table No. 21 (2013) with Paresh Rawal and Tena Desae where he played the role of Vivaan Agasthi. Zee News reviewed his performance as "In this film, Rajeev has proven, yet again, the limit to which his acting skills reach, which – no doubts about that – is the sky." The film grossed ₹10.9 crore (US$1.2 million) domestically.

He next featured in the romantic comedy film Ishk Actually (2013) with Neha Ahuja and Raayo S. Bakhirta. He portrayed the character of Neil, who falls passionately for a girl named Gia. Many reviewers questioned Khandelwal about the reason for signing the film and called it "Boredom". The Times Of India cited of his performance:"Rajeev Khandelwal makes his presence felt, while the rest are mediocre. The film grossed ₹0.34 crore (US$36,000) domestically. Khandelwal next acted in the adventure film, Peter Gaya Kaam Se alongside Lekha Washington and Prashant Narayanan. The film's release is on hold. Khandelwal plays the character of Peter Rodrigues in the film. Rajshri Productions' drama thriller Samrat & Co. opposite Madalasa Sharma was Khandelwal's next release. He played the role of Samrat Tilakdhari, a detective who is approached by a lady with a strange case. CNN-IBN criticised the film as:"Why so many good actors like Rajeev Khandelwal, Girish Karnad, Smita Jaykar and Indranil Sengupta agreed to do this film is the one mystery we were unable to solve." Faheem Ruhani of India Today reviewed:"After watching this film you miss the Rajeev Khandelwal who debuted in the brilliantly made Aamir (2008). Better to watch the more thrilling CID on TV than suffer Samrat and his company. The film grossed ₹1.29 crore (US$140,000) domestically.

=== 2015–present: Comeback on television and recent work ===
In 2015, Khandelwal appeared in the Indo-Australian film Salt Bridge where he played the role of Basant, an Indian migrant who arrives in Australia and meets an Australian woman. The film was in a competition for Oscar and has received appreciation from critics. In February 2015, Khandelwal made a comeback to television after seven years with Shrishti Arya and Goldie Behl's media drama based finite television show, Reporters opposite Kritika Kamra. He played the role of Kabir Sharma, the Editor-in-Chief of KKN with a horrid past who falls passionately for a junior reporter, Ananya Kashyap. The show received good reviews and ended on 19 October 2015. He has also worked in Rajeev Jhaveri's directorial Fever. Khandelwal will be soon seen in Remo D'Souza's DOA Death of Amar co-starring Zarine Khan. This was his first experience working on a public sector project. Rajeev khandelwal was the host of zee TV's Juzz baatt which aired on television in 2018 and had 26 episodes.

== Other work ==
Khandelwal's media career started with making documentaries, writing scripts and directing those. One of his documentaries, a fictional series called Samarpan was featured on Doordarshan. Its story revolved around para military forces in India and it also won an award. Khandelwal has also hosted some reality shows. In 2006, he hosted the show Deal Ya No Deal (Indian version of Deal or No Deal) alongside Mandira Bedi. He also hosted two seasons of the reality talk show Sacch Ka Saamna in 2007 and 2008. He had also become the brand ambassador of National Geographic Channel's show Super Cars and hosted it. In 2016, Khandelwal hosted a documentary film, The Legend Of Jaggannath, which takes a behind-the-scenes look at the Indian religious festival of Rath Yatra. In 2016, he sang for the promotional version of the song "Teri Yaad" from his film Fever.

== Filmography ==
=== Films ===
Year	Title	Role	Notes	Ref(s)
2008	Aamir	Dr. Aamir Ali	Debut film	
2011	Shaitan	Inspector Arvind Mathur		
2011	Soundtrack	Raunak Kaul		
2012	Will You Marry Me?	Rajveer		
2013	Table No.21	Vivaan Agasthi		
2013	Ishk Actually	Neil		
2014	Peter Gaya Kaam Se	Peter Rodrigues	Released only at a film festival	
2014	Samrat & Co.	Samrat Tilakdhari		
2016	The Legend Of Jaggannath	Host	Documentary film	
2016	Fever	Armin Salem		
2016	DOA: Death of Amar	Amar Anand	Film festival release	
2017	Salt Bridge	Basant		
2019	Pranaam	Ajay Singh		
2020	Ateet	Ateet Rana	Zee5 film	
2020	Court Martial	Captain Bikash Roy	Zee5 film	
2022	Salaam Venky	Dr. Shekhar Tripathi		
2023	Bloody Daddy	Sameer Singh		JioCinema film

=== Television ===
Year	Title	Role	Notes	Ref(s)
1998	Banphool	Maharaaj	Debut	
2002	Kya Hadsaa Kya Haqeeqat	Raj Karmarkar		
2003-2005	Kahiin To Hoga	Sujal Garewal		
2005	Time Bomb 9/11	Field Officer Varun Awasthi		
2006	Deal Ya No Deal	Host	Game Show	
2006	Sun Leyna	Sharim		
2006	C.I.D.	ACP Prithviraj		
2006	Left Right Left	Captain Rajveer Singh Shekhawat		
2008	C.I.D.	Himself	Episode 519: The Case of the Missing Bride	
2009	Sacch Ka Saamna	Host	Talk Show	
2011	Sacch Ka Saamna 2	Host	Talk Show	
2011	Super Cars	Host	Reality Show	
2013	My Endeavour	Host	Reality Show	
2015	Reporters	Kabir Sharma		
2018	Juzzbaatt	Host	Talk Show	
2019	Rag Rag Mein Ganga	Himself	Travelogue for DD National	
2021	Rag Rag Mein Ganga Season 2	Himself	Travelogue for DD National	
2026	Tum Ho Naa - Ghar Ki Superstar	Host		

=== Web series ===
Year	Title	Role	Platform	Notes	Reference
2018	Haq Se	Dr. Naushaad Rizvi	ALTBalaji	Digital Debut	
2019	Coldd Lassi Aur Chicken Masala	Chef Vikram Singh Chauhan	ALTBalaji and ZEE5		
2019	Marzi	Dr. Anurag Saraswat	Voot		
2020	Naxalbari	Raghav	ZEE5		
2022	Miya Biwi Aur Murder	DCP Jayesh Roy	MX Player		
2024	Showtime	Arman Singh	Disney+ Hotstar		
2025	The Secret of the Shiledars	Dr. Ravi Bhatt	Disney+ Hotstar		
2026	' 'Amar Vishwas' '	MX Player			

== Discography ==
Year	Song	Film	Ref(s)
2016	Teri Yaad	Fever	

== Awards and nominations ==
Year	Award	Category	Work	Result	Reference
2004	Indian Telly Awards	Best Fresh New Face (Male)	Kahin To Hoga	Won	
2004	Indian Telly Awards	Best Television Personality	Kahin To Hoga	Won	
2004	Indian Telly Awards	Best Onscreen Couple (Aamna Shariff)	Kahin To Hoga	Won	
2005	Indian Telly Award	Best Television Personality	Kahin To Hoga	Won	
2005	MTV Lycra Style Awards	Most Stylish Persona (Male)	Kahin To Hoga	Won	
2005	MTV Lycra Style Awards	Most Stylish Actor On TV	Kahin To Hoga	Won	
2006	MTV Lycra Style Awards	Most Stylish Host On TV	Deal Ya No Deal	Won	
2007	Gold Awards	Best Actor In Leading Role (Male)	Left Right Left	Won	
2007	Sansui Television Awards	Best Actor Popular (Male)	Left Right Left	Won	
2008	Indian Telly Awards	Special Commendations	Aamir	Won	
2009	Filmfare Awards	Best Male Debut	Aamir	Nominated	
2009	Screen Awards	Best Male Debut	Aamir	Nominated	
2009	Indian Telly Awards	Best Anchor	Sacch Ka Saamna	Won	
2011	Indian Television Academy Awards	Best Anchor (Game/Quiz Show)	Sacch Ka Saamna	Won	
2012	Screen Awards	Best Ensemble Cast (Shiv Panditt, Kalki Koechlin, Gulshan Devaiah, Kirti Kulhari, Neil Bhoopalam)	Shaitan	Nominated	

== See also ==
- List of Indian television actors
