= Smiling Fish and Goat on Fire =

- Directed by: Kevin Jordan
- Written by: Kevin Jordan
- Starring: Derick Martini; Bill Henderson; Steven Martini; Christa Miller; Amy Hathaway; Rosemarie Addeo
- Release date: September 16, 1999 (TIFF)
- Running time: 90 minutes
- Country: United States
- Language: English

Smiling Fish And Goat On Fire is a film about brothers, made by brothers Derick Martini and Steven Martini who wrote, produced and portrayed two brothers, and directed by Kevin Jordan, writer/director of Brooklyn Lobster. Martin Scorsese served as the Executive Producer and it won the Discovery Award at the Toronto International Film Festival. The film also won the Audience Award at the 2000 Milan International Film Festival. It was released theatrically in September 2000 by the now defunct Stratosphere Entertainment.

== Cast ==
- Derick Martini as Chris Remi
- Amy Hathaway as Alison
- Steven Martini as Tony Remi
- Heather Moudy as Nicole (as Heather Jae Marie)
- Wesley Thompson as Burt
- Melba Englander as Nurse
- Rena Riffel as Party Girl #2
