= Amy Hathaway =

American actress (born 1974)

- Born: July 27, 1974 (age 52); Los Angeles, California, U.S.
- Years active: 1980-2013
- Spouse(s): Derick Martini (2001-2003); Nicholas Jarardi (2010-present)
- Children: 4

Amy Hathaway (born 1974) is an American former actress. She first came to prominence as a teenaged actor, playing the role of Shelby Haskell in seasons two and three of My Two Dads (1989–90). She had major co-starring roles in the TV movie Last Exit to Earth (1996) and the feature film Joyride (1997). Her last television role was in a 2009 episode of The Closer, and her last film was a lead role in Gemini Rising (2013).

== Career ==
=== 1980s to 1990s ===
Hathaway made her debut in film in the year 1988, in the television film Mutts. In 1989, she acted in the film Kinjite: Forbidden Subjects that starred Charles Bronson. Her role was Rita Crowe who was the daughter of Bronson's character, LAPD Vice Squad detective Lt. Crowe.

From 1987 to 1990, Hathaway played the part of Shelby Haskell in the sitcom series My Two Dads as the best friend of lead character Nicole (Staci Keanan). in 1991, she appeared in the episode "Frank and Denise" of the series The Wonder Years, playing the episode's title character of Denise "The Grease" Lavelle, opposite Noah Blake as Frank "The Stank" Stanavukovic.

In 1996, Hathaway co-starred as Kali in the Katt Shea directed sci-fi TV movie Last Exit to Earth. In 1997, she played the part of Tanya in Joyride. Her character, a ravishing young hussy, was the daughter of a slimy man played by Adam West who uses her to entrap men.

One of Hathaway's last feature film roles for the 1990s was in the Bryan Cranston directed Last Chance which was released in 1999.

=== 2000s ===
Hathaway co-starred in the film Smiling Fish and Goat on Fire, released in 2000. It was a film about two brothers, with Hathaway playing the troubled Allison, girlfriend of Chris (played by her soon-to-be husband, Derick Martini). She played the part of Lynn in Sven Pape's comedy L.A. Twister that was released in 2004.

In 2009, she appeared as Lauren in the episode "Walking Back the Cat" of the series The Closer. In 2013, she co-starred in the sci-fi thriller Gemini Rising which starred Lance Henriksen.

=== Other work ===
Hathaway is currently a board adviser and stock holder in iDream Media Inc.

== Personal life ==
Hathaway was married to Derick Martini from 2001 to 2003. Between 2002 and 2004, she attended Santa Monica College and then, studied at the University of California and earned a degree in biological sciences. She is the great-granddaughter of a survivor of the Titanic sinking.

Hathaway married Nicholas Jarardi, with whom she went to school in the fourth grade at Chandler School. In 2008, they reconnected on Facebook and from there dated and married in 2010. They reside in Los Angeles with their four children.

She is an honorary member of "The New Hollywood" Women's Goal Group Inc. that was founded by actress Brianna Brown.

== Filmography ==
Film roles
Year	Title	Role
1989	Kinjite: Forbidden Subjects	Rita Crowe
1994	The Client	Karen
1996	Courage Under Fire	Annie
1996	Joyride	Tanya
1997	The Small Hours	N/A
1997	The Sleepless	N/A
1998	In God's Hands	Girl on train
1998	Dante's View	Vicky
1999	Last Chance	Ava
2000	Smiling Fish and Goat on Fire	Alison
2001	The Cure for Boredom	Betty
2002	A.K.A. Birdseye	Heidi Logan
2004	L.A. Twister	Lynn
2005	Mr. & Mrs. Smith	Beauty
2008	The Rascal	Cynthia Fiesta
2009	The Proposal	Dia
2013	Gemini Rising	Lisa Morgan

Television roles
Year	Title	Role	Notes
1988	Mutts	Chris Hayden	TV movie
1988	14 Going on 30	Young Peggy	TV movie
1989–1990	My Two Dads	Shelby Haskell	32 episodes
1991	The Wonder Years	Denise Lavelle	Episode: "Frank and Denise"
1992	The Torkelsons	Callie Kimbro	Episodes: "The Ice Princess", "It's My Party"
1992	Arresting Behavior	Rhonda Ruskin	5 episodes
1993	The Hat Squad	Lisa	Episode: "Lifestyles of the Rich and Infamous"
1994	Weird Science	Deb	Episode: "Wyatt Erectus"
1994	Lois & Clark: The New Adventures of Superman	Bonnie Parker	Episode: "That Old Gang of Mine"
1995	Earth 2	Young Lydia	Episode: "Natural Born Grendlers"
1996	Murder, She Wrote	Udella Vaughn	Episode: "Murder in Tempo"
1996	Last Exit to Earth	Kali	TV movie
1998	Becker	Lisa	Episode: "Sex in the Inner City"
1998	Zoe, Duncan, Jack and Jane	Gigi	Episode: Pilot
1999	Felicity	Nicole	Episodes: "Love and Marriage", "The Force"
2001	Gideon's Crossing	Rachel	Episode: "Freak Show"
2002	Buffy the Vampire Slayer	Christine	Episode: "Seeing Red"
2009	CSI: Crime Scene Investigation	Diane Palento	Episode: "The Grave Shift"
2009	Castle	Attorney	Episode: "Hell Hath No Fury"
2009	The Closer	Lauren Hines	Episode: "Walking Back the Cat"
