= Karmveer Choudhary =

Indian actor and motivational speaker

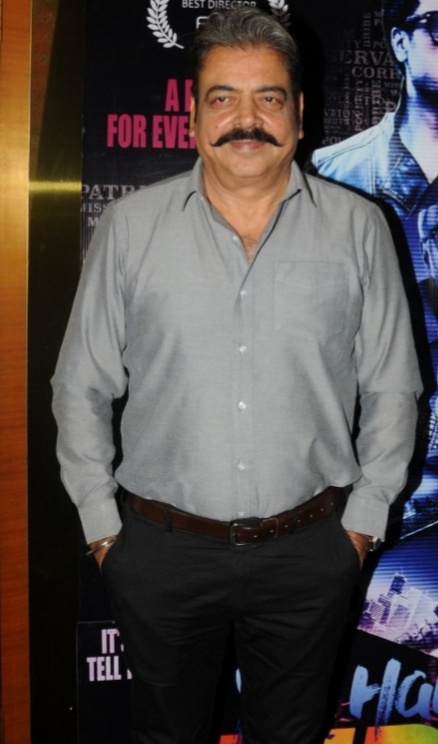
- Born: 24 July 1963 (age 63); Jhunjhunu, Rajasthan
- Education: Dayanand college Ajmer, M.COM
- Occupations: Actor; motivational speaker
- Years active: 2005-present
- Known for: Badho Bahu, Dangal
- Spouse: Bhawna choudhary (m. 1987)
- Children: Ritu Choudhary Ankit Choudhary, Dr Piyush Joshi, Spine Surgeon (Son-in-Law), kanika choudhary (daughter-in-law)
- Parent(s): Laxmi Devi(mother); Bhagwan Singh (father)
- Awards: Best Villain 2014 Jaipur International Film Festival

Karmveer Choudhary (born 24 July 1963) is an Indian actor and motivational speaker known for his works in Hindi cinema and Indian television.

== Life and career ==
He started his career with Rajasthani Cinema (regional cinema), where he has appeared in more than 20 films as the villain. He came into prominence after being cast in the 2016 movie Sultan, where he acted as a government sports officer. He also played Aamir Khan's father in Dangal. Choudhary appeared on the television show Badho Bahu as Kailash Singh Ahlawat (Lucky's Tau Ji) aired on & TV during 2016–18. Prior to his acting career, he stood for election as a Samajwadi Party candidate in 2003 from Mavli constituency in Udaipur. He appeared on the television show Kuch Rang Pyar Ke Aise Bhi as Khatri (Main Villain), aired on Sony TV (India) during 2016 - 17 and Kya Qusoor Hai Amala Ka? as Hemraj, aired on Star Plus (2017). He also appeared in Mere Brother Ki Dulhan, with Katrina Kaif (2011). He was awarded for Best Villain at the Jaipur Film Festival in 2014. He has also done TV Commercials for Kurkure in 2009, Symphony cooler in 2013, Pepsi in 2015 and IDFC Bank in 2016. He played a strong character as Pandit Ji in Waarrior Savitri (2016). He played the main villain in Gauraiya (2015).

== Filmography ==
=== Films ===
Year	Title	Character	Language	Notes
2008	Odh Li Chunariya	Thakur	Rajasthani	
2009	Beero Bhat Bharan Ne Aayo	Hardev Singh	Rajasthani	
2009	Maa Bhatiyani Sa Ro Rati Jaago	Thakur	Rajasthani	
2010	Veer	Mantri of Jacky Shroff	Hindi	
2011	Mere Brother Ki Dulhan	Hariyanvi Girl's Father	Hindi	
2011	Hum Tum Shabana	Gangster	Hindi	
2013	Dangal	Govardhan	Rajasthani	
2013	Kahani Ek Devi Ki	Babu Ram		
2013	Nirankush	Mukhtar Bhai Don		
2014	Mothers Day - Sharman Joshi Speaks The Truth			Short film
2015	Gauraiya	Dhanua		
2016	Dangal	Mr. Phogat, Mahavir's Father	Hindi	
2016	Sultan	Govt. Sports Officer	Hindi	
2016	Waarrior Savitri	Pandit Ji	Hindi	
2017	Karz - The Story Of A Daughter			Short film
2018	Beti - Meri Beti Mera Abhiman			Short film
2019	Panipat (film)	King Suraj Mal	Hindi	
2019	Yeh Hai India	Dashrath singh	Hindi	
2022	Bhool Bhulaiyaa 2	Mukhya	Hindi	
2023	Rocky Aur Rani Kii Prem Kahaani	Dada ji	Hindi	
2023	A Winter Tale at Shimla	Deputy CM	Hindi	
2026	Toaster	Guruji	Hindi	
TBA	Bhagwan Ke Liye Mujhe Chhod Do	Don	TBA	
TBA	Mumbai Tiger	Home Minister	TBA	
TBA	Guns Of Gujarat	D G P	TBA	

=== Television ===
Year	Serial Name	Character	Notes
2010	Jyoti	Roy Sahab	
2010–2011	Zindagi Ka Har Rang...Gulaal	Sarpanch	
2012	Adrishya	Officer	
2012	Balika Vadhu	Shambhu Singh	
2012	26 12	Motiwala	
2012–2013	Aamna Samna	Pratap singh	
2012–2015	Adaalat		
2012–2017	Savdhaan India		
2013	Shaitaan	Kapoor Sahab	
2013	Aashiyana	Khurana	
2013–2015	CID		
2013–2016	Crime Patrol		
2015	Code Red		
2015–2016	Pyaar Tune Kya Kiya	Father	
2016–2017	Kuch Rang Pyar Ke Aise Bhi	Khatri	
2016–2018	Badho Bahu	Kailash Singh Ahlawat	
2017	Kya Kasoor Hai Amla Ka	Hemraj	
2019	Patiala Babes	Sardar Singh Chautala	
2025	Dhaakad Beera	Sarpanch	
2026–present	Lakshmi Niwas	Jagannath Choudhary	

=== Web series ===
Year	Serial Name	Character	Platform	Notes
2020	Undekhi	Kandpal	SonyLIV	
2020	Paper	Minister Rawat	Ullu	
2020	Mum Bhai	Minister Chavan	ALTBalaji & Zee5	
2021	Saat Kadam	Prakash team owner	Eros Now	
2023	Bambai Meri Jaan	Home Minister	Amazon Prime Video	
2024	Murshid (TV series)	Namdev kulkarni	Zee5	

== See also ==
- List of Bollywood actors
- List of Indian television actors
