= Lymelife =

- Theatrical release poster
- Directed by: Derick Martini
- Written by: Derick Martini; Steven Martini
- Produced by: Alec Baldwin; Steven Martini; Barbara DeFina; Jon Cornick; Angela Somerville; Michele Tayler
- Starring: Rory Culkin; Alec Baldwin; Kieran Culkin; Emma Roberts
- Cinematography: Frank Godwin
- Edited by: Derick Martini; Steven Martini; Mark Yoshikawa
- Music by: Steven Martini; The Spaceship Martini
- Production company: Bartlett Films
- Distributed by: Screen Media Films
- Release dates: September 8, 2008 (TIFF); April 8, 2009 (United States; limited)
- Running time: 94 minutes
- Country: United States
- Language: English
- Budget: $1.5 million
- Box office: $526,245

Lymelife is a 2008 American comedy-drama film written by brothers Derick Martini and Steven Martini, and directed by Derick Martini, depicting aspects of their life in 1970s Long Island from a teenager's perspective. It stars Alec Baldwin, Rory Culkin, Kieran Culkin and Emma Roberts. Martin Scorsese served as an executive producer. The film debuted at the 2008 Toronto International Film Festival in September 2008, and won the International Federation of Film Critics Award (FIPRESCI). After its theatrical release in 2009, writer director Derick Martini was nominated for a Gotham Award for Breakthrough Director.

== Plot ==
Set in 1979 Syosset, Long Island, New York, Lymelife follows two families, the Bartletts and the Braggs, who crumble when tangled relationships, real-estate problems, and Lyme disease converge in the heart of suburbia. 15-year-old Scott Bartlett is a gentle boy, radically different from his blustery father Mickey and mother Brenda. An outbreak of Lyme disease, as well as the accompanying paranoia, hits their community hard.

When the Bartlett's neighbor, Charlie Bragg, is diagnosed with the illness, Charlie is unable to work and his wife Melissa must keep the income flowing herself. She is hired by Mickey, a friendly favor motivated by lust. Mickey's history of philandering is one of the many things upsetting Brenda. Scott has been in love with the Braggs' one year-older daughter Adrianna for all his life; she is starting to return his interest.

Charlie spends days hiding in his basement, while his wife believes he is in Manhattan on job interviews. He is obsessed with hunting deer. Scott and Charlie have a good relationship, one of the only ones Charlie is able to maintain throughout his illness. Things heat up when Jimmy, Scott's older brother, comes home from the army on their mom's birthday. Brenda leaves early from Jimmy's going-away party when it is clear that there is a relationship between Mickey and Melissa. Jimmy and Mickey have a confrontation.

Scott learns of the affair and confronts his mother. Adrianna helps him through this, but shuns him after a rumor spread from a lie he tells a friend. Brenda kicks Mickey out of the house and is once again able to act the role of an effective parent. Charlie also confronts Mickey after he inadvertently witnesses the affair; when his wife finds out that he has been letting her earn the family's keep, she packs to leave. Scott and Adrianna reconnect and lose their virginity to each other. Brenda lets Mickey spend the night at their house but on the couch.

== Cast ==
- Rory Culkin as Scott Bartlett
- Alec Baldwin as Mickey Bartlett
- Emma Roberts as Adrianna Bragg
- Jill Hennessy as Brenda Bartlett
- Kieran Culkin as Jimmy Bartlett
- Timothy Hutton as Charlie Bragg
- Cynthia Nixon as Melissa Bragg
- Logan Huffman as Blaze Salado
- Brandon Thane Wilson as Stuart
- Adam Scarimbolo as Todd O'Leary
- Derick Martini as Photographer (uncredited)
- Steven Martini as Taxi driver (uncredited)
- Matthew Martini as Jimmy's friend (uncredited)

== Production ==
The film had a budget of $1.5 million. Portions of the film were shot at Montclair High School in Montclair, New Jersey.

== Release ==
The film began its North American theatrical release in April 2009. Initially, Lymelife was only shown on screens in New York and Los Angeles but eventually expanded to 35 screens. The film grossed $421,307 in the United States and an additional $104,938 internationally for a total worldwide gross of $526,245.

== Reception ==
The film premiered at the 2008 Toronto International Film Festival and won the International Federation of Film Critics award (FIPRESCI). The film received a 63% approval rating on Rotten Tomatoes based on 109 reviews; the average rating is 6.1/10. The consensus states: "Lymelife features sharp performances, but the story lacks the emotional depth or focus worthy of its talented cast." Metacritic, which uses a weighted average, assigned the film a score of 64 out of 100, based on 19 critics, indicating "generally favorable" reviews.
