= DOA: Death of Amar =

- Directed by: Param Gill
- Produced by: Remo D'Souza
- Starring: Rajeev Khandelwal; Zareen Khan; Prashant Narayanan
- Cinematography: Rajesh Kata
- Music by: Meet Bros, Raga Boys
- Production company: Remo D'Souza Entertainment
- Release date: 16 August 2014
- Country: India
- Language: Hindi

DOA: Death of Amar is a 2014 Hindi-language film. Starring Rajeev Khandelwal, Zareen Khan and Prashant Narayanan, the film received its world premiere on 16 August 2014 as an official selection at the 22nd San Francisco Global Movie Fest and won the Audience Choice Award. The film was also awarded for Best Original Score. The film is produced by Remo D'Souza and directed by Param Gill.

== Synopsis ==
The story revolves around a struggling actor who is poisoned and has few hours to live. He must find out who killed him and why.

== Cast ==
- Rajeev Khandelwal as Actor
- Zareen Khan as Journalist
- Prashant Narayanan as Mafia Don
- Murli Sharma as Cop
