= Rag Rag Mein Ganga =

- Directed by: Divya Bhardwaj
- Starring: Rajeev Khandelwal
- No. of episodes: 21

Rag Rag Mein Ganga is an Indian television travel series produced by Doordarshan in association with the National Mission for Clean Ganga (NMCG). The series was launched by union water resources minister Nitin Gadkari and aired on DD National on 2 February 2019.

== Overview ==
The show is being hosted by Rajeev Khandelwal, who travels around the Himalayan regions to depict the story of the origin of river Ganga and its journey from Gangotri to Ganga Sagar. The series comprises 21 episodes. The show was shot in Uttarakhand under the direction of Divya Bhardwaj, some of the shots of this serial were shot at the Alaknanda-Bhagirathi Sangam site, Sri Raghunath Temple, Ramkund and the Nakshatra Observatory Institute.

== Cast ==
- Rajeev Khandelwal as anchor

== See also ==
- Ekaant, Indian television series
