= Birdseye (film) =

- Directed by: Stephen Beckner; Michael Huber
- Written by: Stephen Beckner; Michael Huber
- Produced by: Karin Koch; Patrick Tönz; Stephan Schindel; Samir
- Starring: Stefan Kurt; Fred Ward; Amy Hathaway; Jaimz Woolvett; Beth Grant
- Cinematography: Thomas Wüthrich
- Edited by: Markus Welter
- Music by: Chris Vrenna; Clint Walsh
- Production companies: Dschoint Ventschr Filmproduktion AG; SRF Schweizer Radio und Fernsehen; Teleclub AG
- Distributed by: Look Now! Distribution
- Release date: August 2002
- Running time: 90 minutes
- Countries: Switzerland; United States
- Languages: English; Swiss German

A.K.A. Birdseye is a 2002 Swiss film directed by Stephen Beckner and Michael Huber. The film follows Colorado sheriff Nolan Sharpless as he investigates the disappearance of a Swiss man known as Birdseye. Presented in a documentary-like style that incorporates surveillance footage and television formats, it premiered in August 2002.

== Synopsis ==
Colorado sheriff Nolan Sharpless becomes drawn into a pursuit of a notorious criminal after the kidnapping of a Swiss tourist. Combining tabloid-style media and reality television elements, the film follows his search for the mysterious Birdseye against the backdrop of American society around the turn of the millennium.

== Cast ==
The cast includes:

- Stefan Kurt as Birdseye/Urs Vogelaug
- Fred Ward as Nolan Sharpless
- Amy Hathaway as Heidi Logan
- Jaimz Woolvett as Fingers
- Beth Grant as Ruth Betters

== Production ==
The directors spent seven years securing financing for the film. When pitching it to potential investors, they used fabricated press materials that presented the story as if it were real. The finished film combines surveillance footage with talk-show, news, and reality-television formats, and shifts between the United States and Zurich, including shots of Colorado.

== Reception ==
Filmdienst described the film as a culturally and formally ambitious detective story that makes skilful use of digital technologies and playfully weaves together different formats.

Swissinfo described the film as a sustained satire of genre films, American mannerisms, and German-speaking Swiss heaviness, but said that it eventually turns in circles and runs out of steam.

Variety described the film as a sophisticated European parody of American television and said its American setting and dialogue could help it find an international audience, while also suggesting that some of its subplots were less successful.

== Festival screenings ==
The film premiered in August 2002, and festival screenings included the Locarno Film Festival in 2002, the Hof International Film Festival in 2002, the Solothurn Film Festival in 2003, the Minneapolis–Saint Paul International Film Festival in 2003, and the Taos Talking Picture Festival in 2003.
