= Waarrior Savitri =

- Official Poster of movie
- Directed by: Param Gill
- Written by: Param Gill
- Produced by: Upender Maheshwari &; Dr. Bobby Kanda
- Starring: Niharica Raizada; Lucy Pinder; Rajat Barmecha; Om Puri; karmveer Choudhary; Gulshan Grover
- Cinematography: Kabir Lal; Syed Shaid Lal; Rodrick "Rip" Jones
- Edited by: Sandeep Francis
- Production company: Dr. Bobs Production
- Release date: 25 August 2016
- Country: India
- Language: Hindi

Waarrior Savitri is a 2016 Indian Hindi-language action drama film written and directed by Param Gill. The film stars Niharica Raizada, Rajat Barmecha, Om Puri, Karmveer Choudhary and Gulshan Grover. Upender Maheshwari and Bobby Kanda produced Waarrior Savitri under the banner of Dr Bob’s Production. It is a modern-day adaptation of the Indian fable – Satyavan Savitri.

Waarrior Savitri has been filmed in Chandelao Garh, Jodhpur, Mumbai and Las Vegas. British model Lucy Pinder made her Bollywood debut with the film. The film was released on 25 August 2016.

The film was banned in many parts of India for portraying goddess Savitri as a modern 21st century woman. Director Param Gill received death threats, and the film received a very low key release.

== Cast ==
- Niharica Raizada as Savitri
- Lucy Pinder as Candy
- Rajat Barmecha as Satya
- Om Puri as Yamraj
- Gulshan Grover as Satya's father
- Karmveer Choudhary as Pandit ji
- Tim Man as The Monk
- Ron Smoorenburg as Mani John
- Sheetal Sharma as Savitri's friend
- Aditya Raj Kapoor as Thakur - Savitri's father
- Palak J. Jhaveri as Baby Savitri

== Music ==
Waarrior Savitri

Soundtrack album
- Released: 1 June 2016
- Genre: Feature film soundtrack
- Length: 13:34
- Language: Hindi
- Label: Zee Music
- Producer: Dr. Bob Productions

All songs were written and composed by Param Gill.

No.	Title	Lyrics	Music	Singer(s)	Length
1.	"Chahat Ki Baarish"	Param Gill	Param Gill	Aaniya	02:45
2.	"Jadon Teri Yaad"	Param Gill	Param Gill	Ustad Rahat Fateh Ali Khan	03:15
3.	"Heavy Heavy"	Param Gill	Param Gill	Labh Janjua	02:12
4.	"Shake my Booty"	Param Gill	Param Gill and Vijay Verma	Shalmali Kholgade	02:49
5.	"Night and Day"	Param Gill	Param Gill	Shaan, Supriya	03:10

== Controversy ==
The film received opposition at some places for its depiction of the Hindu goddess Savitri as a 21st-century woman.
