= Seeing Red (Buffy the Vampire Slayer) =

- Buffy the Vampire Slayer episode
- Episode no.: Season 6 Episode 19
- Directed by: Michael Gershman
- Written by: Steven S. DeKnight
- Production code: 6ABB19
- Original air date: May 7, 2002

Guest appearances
- Danny Strong as Jonathan Levinson; Adam Busch as Warren Mears; Tom Lenk as Andrew Wells; Amy Hathaway as Christine; Nichole Hiltz as Diana; James C. Leary as Clem; Garrett Brawith as Frank; Tim Hager as Administrator; Stephan Marks as Guard #1; Christopher James as Guard #2; Kate Orsini as Girl in Bronze

Episode chronology
← Previous "Entropy"	Next → "Villains"
- Buffy the Vampire Slayer season 6

"Seeing Red" is the 19th episode of season 6 of the television series Buffy the Vampire Slayer. The episode aired on May 7, 2002, on UPN. In North America, this episode was somehow syndicated onto UPN affiliates a week early by accident. Although none of them broadcast the episode by mistake, the episode was leaked onto the internet more than a week before it was slated to air. The episode was also noted for its drastic and controversial content, being the only episode of the series to air at an alternate time on the Canadian family network YTV.

== Plot ==
After their reconciliation, Tara confirms Willow's suspicions that Buffy and Spike have had a sexual relationship, adding that Buffy feels ashamed of her sexual relationship with Spike. Willow is hurt that she was never told, but simply puts it aside when she remembers what Buffy is going through. Buffy breaks into the Trio's lair, but finds the place deserted and ensnared with traps. She escapes, managing to grab a few items before large saw blades tear apart the house. Anya sits with a young scorned woman who wants to wish vengeance on her cheating boyfriend, but Anya is distracted by her own relationship problems to notice the young woman's wish. Dawn visits Spike at his crypt, informing him that she knows he had sex with Anya and Buffy. She lectures him about hurting Buffy when he supposedly loves her.

Meanwhile, in a cave, the Trio kill a large Nezzla demon who is guarding the Orbs of Nezzla'khan. Warren and Andrew make Jonathan wrap himself in the dead Nezzla's skin to cross a barrier that can only be passed by one of the demons, and as he fetches the orbs the other two conspire against him. Warren tests the power of the orbs and is pleased when he can easily kill another demon.

Xander, aghast that Buffy had sex with Spike, storms out of an argument with her. He leaves for The Bronze when the Trio enter. Now enhanced with power, Warren hits on a former schoolmate's girlfriend, and when the woman's boyfriend steps in Warren fights off the boyfriend and several others with ease. Xander tries to intervene but is tossed aside. Later, Buffy, badly injured from patrolling earlier, runs a bath for herself when Spike shows up uninvited and tries to convince her that she loves him. She protests as he forces himself on her, his attempt to make her feel love for him again. With her back injured, Buffy barely manages to stop his advance on her. Immediately horrified by his behavior, Spike attempts to apologize, but Buffy knows he only stopped because she made him. He flees before Xander finds his coat on the stairs, then finds Buffy on the floor in the bathroom with a large bruise on her leg. Xander is stopped from going after Spike when Willow and Tara arrive to tell Buffy they found plans indicating the Trio are planning to steal a large amount of money. After Xander warns her of Warren's new strength, Buffy rushes off to stop them.

Returning to his crypt, Spike pours himself a drink, but is haunted by his rape attempt. Spike boards his motorcycle at the city limits and leaves Sunnydale, vowing to return a changed being. Warren overturns an armored car loaded up with money from a big weekend at an amusement park. Buffy shows up and fights him, but quickly finds herself outmatched against Warren's strength; Warren taunts Buffy with his supposed mastery. Jonathan jumps on Buffy's back and quietly coaches her to smash the orbs on Warren's belt in order to defeat him. No longer strong, Warren uses a hidden jet pack to escape freely into the sky. Andrew attempts to follow suit with his own jet pack, only to knock himself out on the overhanging roof above him. As the cops haul Jonathan and Andrew off to jail, the jetpack-less Jonathan realizes that the two were about to betray him.

The next day, Buffy and Xander begin to discuss Buffy's relationship with Spike, and the two make amends and reaffirm their friendship. As the two hug, Xander spots Warren entering the backyard with a gun. Warren rants about his recent defeat, pulls out the gun, fires directly at Buffy as revenge, then shoots randomly over his shoulder as he runs away. Buffy and Xander topple to the ground as a bullet fires at the window to Willow's bedroom and strikes Tara in the back as she is facing Willow. As Tara collapses and dies, Willow cries out holding her as her eyes turn magically dark red, while outside, Xander tries to stanch the bleeding of Buffy's chest wound.

== Writing ==
The episode continues the emphasis on the consequences of actions. Spike takes the time to explain to Dawn that what he and Anya did was wrong.

This is the first and only episode where Amber Benson (Tara) appears in the main title credits, and is also her death episode. Joss Whedon had long wanted to kill off a major character the first time they joined the main credits. Originally he indicated that he wanted Eric Balfour who played Jesse in "Welcome to the Hellmouth", and "The Harvest" to be added to the beginning credits to add the shock that a main cast character could die unexpectedly, but due to budget constraints he could not be added at the time. Whedon also saw Tara's death as necessary to further Willow's character; she had to deal with her dark powers, but nothing short of Tara's death would allow them to come out so forcefully.

Tara had become popular among fans, and Whedon and series writer David Fury decided that her death would elicit a strong response, something that Whedon felt sure was the correct course to take. He was unprepared, however, for how forcefully viewers reacted to Tara's death. Fans were so upset that some stopped watching. Because the death came at the end of an episode where Willow and Tara were portrayed in bed between sexual encounters, critics accused Whedon of implying that lesbian sex should be punishable by death, a familiar trope in film. Producers were inundated with mail from people—women especially—who expressed their anger, sadness, and frustration with the writing team. Series writer and producer Marti Noxon was unable to read some of the mail because it was so distressing, but she counted the response as a natural indication that television simply had few strong female role models, and no lesbian representation.

Benson defended Whedon in 2007, saying he "is 100 percent behind the LGBT community. I know this for a fact." Author Rhonda Wilcox writes that Tara's death is made more poignant by her earthy naturalness representing the "fragility of the physical". Roz Kaveney comments that Tara's murder is "one of the most upsetting moments of the show's seven seasons", and Nikki Stafford states that the episode in which Tara dies is possibly the most controversial of the series, causing divisions about whether it was necessary, or assertions that Tara was created only to be killed. In response to fans and critics who accused the writers of being motivated by homophobia, Stafford comments, "they seem to forget that it was those same writers who created such an amazing, gentle, and realistic portrait in the first place; that Tara is certainly not the first character to be killed off on the show; and Tara was a lot more than just 'the lesbian', and her character deserves better than that." Kaveney concurs with the opinion that the series avoided playing a cliché, "proving that it is possible for a queer character to die in popular culture without that death being the surrogate vengeance of the straight world".

In the Academy of Television Arts & Sciences panel discussion that took place between seasons six and seven, Alyson Hannigan revealed that getting the shot of Tara's blood spraying onto Willow's shirt was incredibly difficult. Because they only had two shirts, the wardrobe department kept washing the shirts but did not have time to dry them, so the shirt was wet in most of the takes. Hannigan joked that when they finally got the take she was not sure what she was doing acting-wise, she was just concerned with the appearance of the blood on the shirt remaining consistent. In a 2002 interview with the BBC, Benson stated that by the end of the filming of Tara's death scene, both she and Sarah Michelle Gellar were crying, as a close friend of theirs who had worked on the show had died just prior to filming.

In the DVD commentary, James Marsters said that filming the scene in which Spike attempts to rape Buffy was one of the hardest he ever had to do. He has since said that he will never do such a scene again. That scene has also generated controversy between fans and the writers, but Marsters and writer Jane Espenson said that the moment was necessary to set up a powerful motivation for Spike's quest to gain a soul. Marsters would later say in 2012 that he understood the idea to have come from "a female writer, [who] had a situation in her life where she was and her boyfriend were breaking up and she decided if she just made love to him one more time, that they wouldn't break up. She ended up trying to force herself on him and decided to write about that. The thing is, if you flip it and make it a man forcing himself on a woman, I believe it becomes a whole different thing... I'm not really sure it expressed what the author was intending and on that score it was not successful."

In her essay on sex and violence in Buffy the Vampire Slayer, Gwyn Symonds calls the scene itself "technically and emotionally intricate" in that, unlike most depictions of attempted rape, it "encourages a complex audience engagement with both... the perpetrator and the victim." The action was "very carefully choreographed" according to James Marsters, with the camera alternating between close-ups of Buffy and Spike separately to reinforce the audience's shifting empathy with both Buffy and Spike. Writer Rebecca Rand Kirshner agrees that the viewer "could feel how [Spike's] very innards were twisted into this perversion of what he wanted," and she found that experiencing the scene from his perspective was additionally disturbing.

== Cast ==
=== Starring ===
- Sarah Michelle Gellar as Buffy Summers
- Nicholas Brendon as Xander Harris
- Emma Caulfield as Anya Jenkins
- Michelle Trachtenberg as Dawn Summers
- Amber Benson as Tara Maclay (Benson's only appearance in the main cast credits)
- James Marsters as Spike
- Alyson Hannigan as Willow Rosenberg

=== Guest starring ===
- Danny Strong as Jonathan Levinson
- Adam Busch as Warren Mears
- Tom Lenk as Andrew Wells
- Amy Hathaway as Christine (Blonde)
- Nichole Hiltz as Diana (Beautiful Woman)

=== Co-starring ===
- James C. Leary as Clem
- Garrett Brawith as Frank
- Tim Hager as Administrator
- Stephan Marks as Guard #1
- Christopher James as Guard #2
- Kate Orsini as Girl at Bronze
