= Going to America (film) =

- Theatrical Release Poster
- Directed by: Param Gill
- Written by: John Buchanan; Param Gill
- Story by: Anzeljc Vojko
- Produced by: J Bhandal; Param Gill
- Starring: Eddie Griffin; Josh Meyers; Najarra Townsend; Penny Marshall; Dave Vescio
- Cinematography: Rudy Harbon
- Edited by: Ludmil Kazakov
- Music by: Andrew Thomas Gallegos
- Distributed by: Sony Pictures
- Release dates: August 15, 2014 (San Francisco); August 28, 2015 (United States)
- Running time: 90 minutes
- Country: United States
- Language: English

Going to America is a 2014 American black comedy film written and directed by Param Gill set to release nationwide in AMC theaters on 28 August 2015. The film toured the festival circuit under the title of Last Supper and won numerous awards. The film received favorable reviews from critics with Atlas and Aeris independent film magazine calling director Param Gill as the next big independent filmmaker in Hollywood. The film stars Eddie Griffin, Josh Meyers, Najarra Townsend, Dave Vescio and Penny Marshall. It is about two lunatics who escape a mental institution to make a film. It was the opening night film at 22nd annual San Francisco Global Movie Festival on August 15, 2014. The film swept the festival with wins in five categories including best director for Param Gill with a cash award of $100,000.

== Synopsis ==
Going to America is about two romantic and ambitious lunatics, Fumnanya (Eddie Griffin) and Andy (Josh Meyers) who escape a mental institution with a video camera and set out to make a movie about their romantic quest to find a princess and be rewarded with a magical kiss. The duo encounters various obstacles, not the least of which is that their 'princess' turns out to be a burned-out prostitute (Najarra Townsend) who wants to commit suicide. She enlists Fumnanya and Andy to help her, only to have her suicide plans turn out to be a disaster and her pimp Rocco (Dave Vescio) emerge as a menacing threat. But along the way, the trio ends up becoming overnight sensations on YouTube, as followers speculate whether the whole thing is a clever hoax or a moving if unorthodox attempt at redemption.

== Awards ==
Award	Person	Event
Best Director	Param Gill	Los Angeles International Film Festival 2014
Best Film	J Bhandal	Los Angeles International Film Festival 2014
Best Actor	Eddie Griffin	Los Angeles International Film Festival 2014
Best Actress	Najarra Townsend	Los Angeles International Film Festival 2014
Platinum Award	Param Gill	Oregon Film Festival Awards 2014
Best Director	Param Gill	San Francisco Global Movie Fest 2014
Best Film	J Bhandal	San Francisco Global Movie Fest 2014
Best Actor	Eddie Griffin	San Francisco Global Movie Fest 2014
Best Actress	Najarra Townsend	San Francisco Global Movie Fest 2014
Best Editor	Ludmil Kazakov	San Francisco Global Movie Fest 2014
Award of merit	Param Gill	Indie Fest Awards 2014
Best Film	Param Gill	International Independent Film Awards 2015
Best Film	Param Gill	Accolade Global Film Awards 2015
Official Finalist	Param Gill	American Movie Awards 2015

== Principal cast ==
Actor	Role
Eddie Griffin	Fumnanya
Josh Meyers	Andy
Najarra Townsend	Candy
Dave Vescio	Rocco
Yves Bright	Dr Tucker
Mindy Robinson	Nurse Betty
Penny Marshall	Herself

== Development and production ==
The film was loosely adapted from an original Slovenian film which was the biggest box office hit in the history of Slovenian Cinema. Lindsay Lohan was originally asked to play the role of Candy but the role eventually went to Najarra Townsend. Penny Marshall has a cameo and plays herself.

== Reception ==
The initial trailer was released on June 23, 2014 to a mixed response.
