= Dave Vescio =

American actor

- Born: David Allan Vescio; June 24, 1970 (age 54); Somerset, Pennsylvania, United States
- Education: Atlantic Theater Company
- Occupation(s): Soldier, actor, photojournalist
- Years active: 2005–present
- Height: 1.78 m (5 ft 10 in)

David Allen Vescio (born June 24, 1970) is an American actor and former soldier and photojournalist best known for his villainous roles in film and television. Such as his role in the films Hick, Lost Soul, House of Flesh Mannequins, Air Collision, Gemini Rising and Virus X.

== Early life ==
When Vescio was young his father was in the army which led him to move twelve times by the time he was 18. He also went to three different elementary schools, two middle schools, and two high schools. Dave Vescio lived in seven different states by that time of traveling.

== Service in the US military ==
Vescio served in the US army with the 25th Infantry Division (United States) as an infantryman and was honored for making a citizen's arrest by KNX Newsradio (CBS Radio)

== Substance abuse ==
While in the military Vescio became a substance abuser of alcohol and illegal drugs. In an interview he stated: "I was mostly dealing LSD, sometimes cocaine, sometimes steroids". He was eventually caught and evaded the police for a year and a half before being arrested in the state of Virginia at the age of 23 and then sentenced to ten years at Fort Leavenworth Maximum security prison.

== Filmography ==
=== Film ===
Year	Title	Role	Notes
2005	Manic	The Man	Short film
2005	Blue Hour	Eyepatch	
2005	SomePlace Wonderful	Toothfairy	Short film
2006	Damon	Ciscirri	
2006	Wunderkind	Willy	Short film
2007	Kill Your Inner Child	Aaron	Video
2008	Paula Peril: Midnight Is the Darkest Hour	Delphi	
2008	The Two Men	Jack	
2008	Wading	Waiter	Short film
2009	Spicy Mac Project	FBI David	
2009	Truly Blessed	Jeremy	
2009	Soul Diaspora	Zach	
2009	Sister of Night	Kafni	
2009	Lost Soul	Donald	
2010	The Alley	Det. DeAngelo	
2010	Q for Death	David Jacobs	Video
2010	Changing Hands	Tony	
2011	Vic	Dave	Short film
2011	The Custom Mary	Pat	
2011	Hick	Stranger	
2012	Delusions of Grandeur	Guy	
2012	Air Collision	Eli Reyher	Video
2012	The Millionaire Tour	Eddie	
2012	Betty I Am	Bruce the Killer	
2013	Alien Rising	Dr. Bainbridge	
2013	Revelation Road 2 The Sea of Glass and Fire	Dale	
2013	Vanquisher	Dr. Walter Zeigler	
2013	The Trials of Cate McCall	Sign Man	Post-production
2013	The Divine Order	Elyon	Post-production
2014	The Legacy of Avril Kyte	Vandal	Pre-production
2014	Holy Masquerade	Andy	Announced
2014	Last Supper	Rocco	Thanksgiving 2014 Release
????	Blood on the Border	Bennie	Pre-production
????	Chinook	Shane	Announced

=== Television ===
Year	Title	Role	Notes
2007	The Real Roswell	Maj. Jesse Marcel	TV film
2007	Andrew Jackson	Sen. John Tyler	TV film
2008	Bedside Manor	Prostate Patient	Episode: "Prostate Problems"
2008	Amazing Sports Stories	Bootlegger	Episode: "Mysterious Montague: Golf's Greatest Con Man"
2008	Pushing Twilight	Security Guard	Episode: "Justin"
2009	The Skyjacker That Got Away	FBI Special Agent	TV film
2010	1000 Ways to Die	Religious Fanatic	Episode: "Gratefully Dead"
2011	Got Home Alive	Walter Kieser	Episode: "Jailed in Katrina, Bhutan Motorcycle Crash, Kings Canyon Rescue"
