= Rory Culkin =

American actor (born 1989)

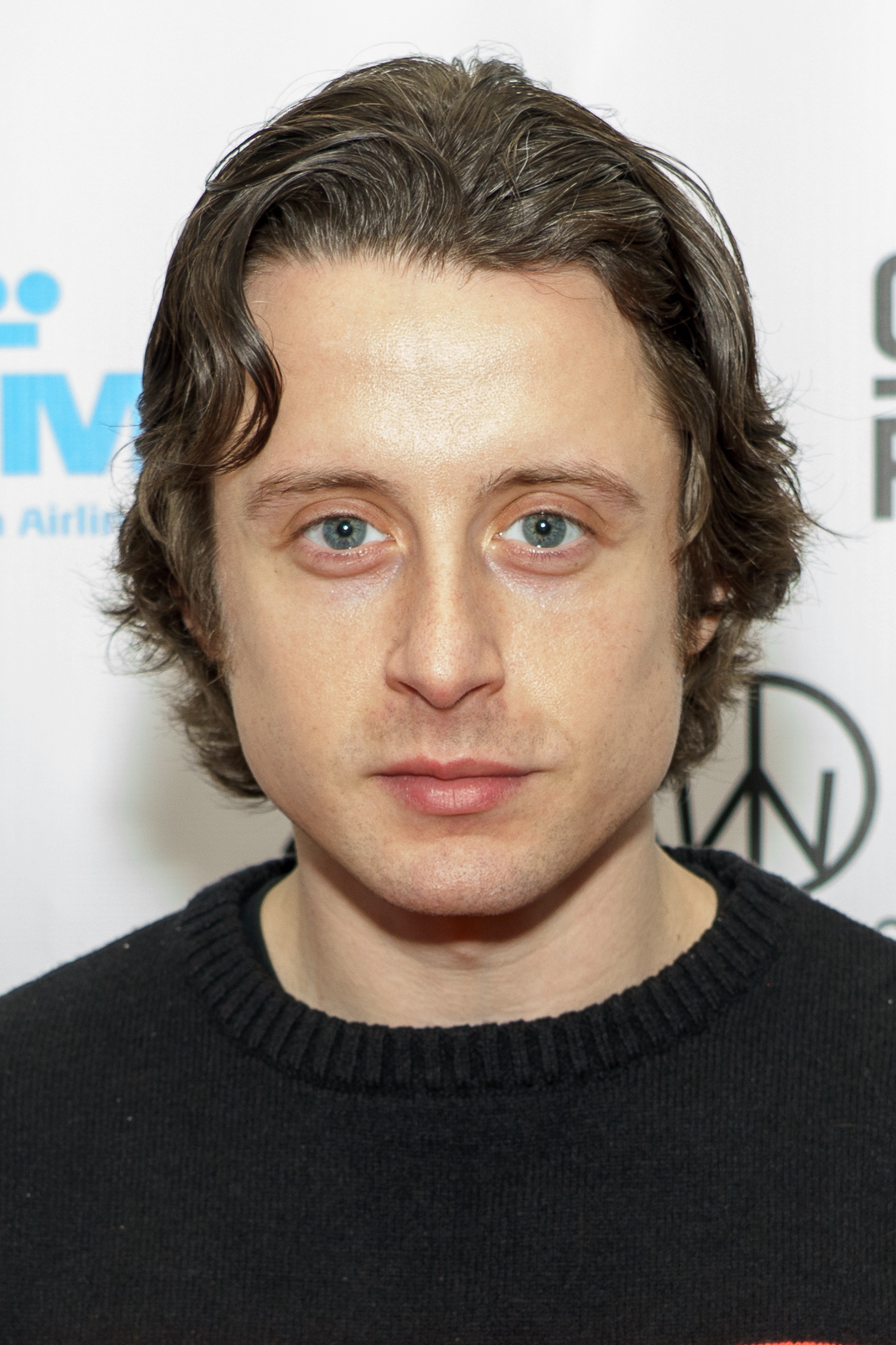
- Culkin at the 2025 Woodstock Film Festival
- Born: Rory Hugh Culkin; July 21, 1989 (age 37); New York City, U.S.
- Occupation: Actor
- Years active: 1993–present
- Spouse: Sarah Scrivener (m. 2018; div. 2022)
- Partner: Katelin Arizmendi (2023–present)
- Children: 1
- Father: Kit Culkin
- Relatives: Macaulay Culkin (brother); Kieran Culkin (brother); Bonnie Bedelia (aunt)

Rory Hugh Culkin (born July 21, 1989) is an American actor known for his roles in You Can Count on Me (2000), Signs (2002), Scream 4 (2011), Columbus (2017), and Lords of Chaos (2018). He has also appeared on television series such as Waco (2018), Under the Banner of Heaven (2022), and the Black Mirror (2023) episode "Beyond the Sea." In 2025, his short film Dear Shop Girl premiered at the Woodstock Film Festival.

He is the youngest brother of actors Macaulay and Kieran Culkin.

== Early life ==
Culkin was born on July 21, 1989, in New York City. His father is Christopher "Kit" Culkin, a former Broadway stage actor. His mother is Patricia Brentrup, a native of North Dakota who met Kit in 1974 while working as a road traffic controller in Sundance, Wyoming. Rory is the youngest of their seven children. Culkin's siblings include Shane (b. 1976), Dakota (1979–2008), Macaulay (b. 1980), Kieran (b. 1982), Quinn (b. 1984), and Christian (b. 1987). He also had a paternal half-sister, Jennifer (1970–2000). Culkin's paternal aunt is actress Bonnie Bedelia. He has German, Irish, and Norwegian ancestry.

== Career ==
Culkin began acting by playing alongside his elder brothers, among them Macaulay and Kieran, often as the younger versions of their characters. He first appeared in a photograph as a baby in The Good Son (1993), then as Young Richie in Ri¢hie Ri¢h (1994) (Richie being played by his brother Macaulay) and in 2002, played 10-year-old Igby in Igby Goes Down (17-year-old Igby was played by his older brother Kieran).

Culkin's breakthrough role was in You Can Count on Me (2000), opposite Laura Linney, a role for which he received much praise and a Young Artist Award. Since then, Culkin has appeared in numerous films, including Signs (2002), in which he starred alongside Mel Gibson and Joaquin Phoenix, and Electrick Children, in which he starred alongside Julia Garner.

As a teenager, Rory started moving into more independent films. He took a leading role in Mean Creek (2004), a film about a group of teenagers that plan revenge on a bully. The entire youth cast won an Independent Spirit Award for this film. He appeared in other independent films, such as The Chumscrubber (2005), Down in the Valley (2005), and Hick (2011).

Since his Young Artist Award win for You Can Count on Me, Culkin has received three more nominations. He had a guest role in the Law & Order: Special Victims Unit episode "Manic", and in the episode "Azoth the Avenger Is a Friend of Mine" of The Twilight Zone alongside Patrick Warburton. In May 2010, Culkin was cast for the slasher film Scream 4, which was released on April 15, 2011. Culkin was cast as Euronymous in the biographical film Lords of Chaos (2018) which tells the story about the events of the Norwegian black metal scene and the band Mayhem.

In 2014, Culkin starred as the titular character in Gabriel. Culkin was commended by critics, and was subsequently nominated for the Gotham Independent Film Award for Breakthrough Actor.

In 2016, he appeared in the horror movies Welcome to Willits and Jack Goes Home.

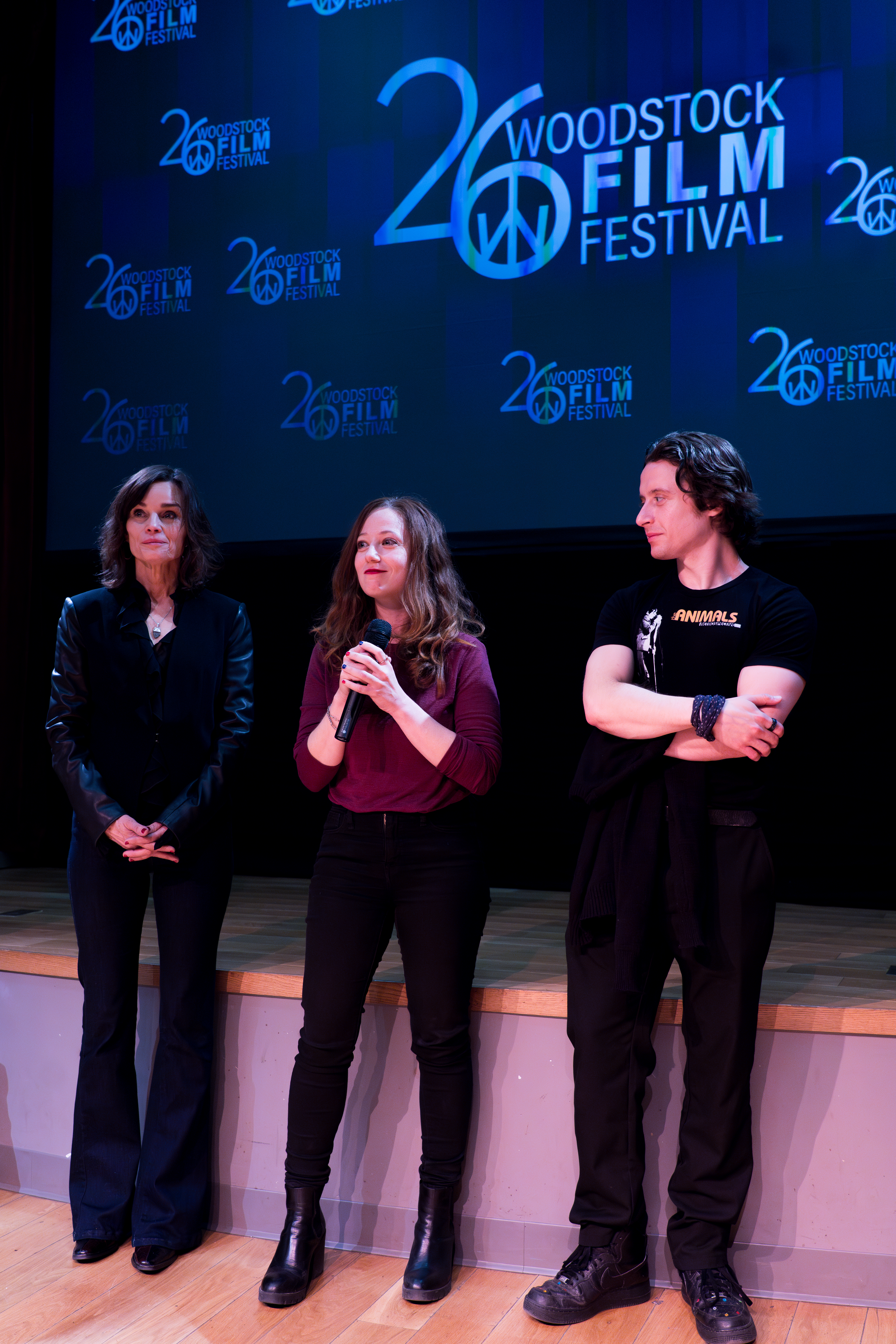
Culkin with Lorraine Farris and Nira Burstein at the 2025 Woodstock Film Festival

In 2023, Culkin guest-appeared in Amazon Prime Video series Swarm.

In June of 2026, it was announced Culkin would star opposite Lauren LaVera in Red Wedding, a new horror-thriller film.

== Personal life ==
Culkin met cinematographer Sarah Scrivener in 2010 during the production of Scre4m, and worked together on several projects. They got engaged in December 2017, and were married on April 7, 2018 in New Orleans, Louisiana. Their wedding was officiated by Paul Heyman on the eve of WrestleMania 34. Culkin and Scrivener eventually separated.

Culkin entered a relationship with cinematographer Katelin Arizmendi in 2023. They welcomed their first child, a daughter, on May 23, 2026.

== Filmography ==
=== Film ===
Year	Title	Role	Notes
1993	The Good Son	Richard Evans	Cameo
1994	Richie Rich	Young Richie Rich	
2000	You Can Count on Me	Rudy Prescott	
2002	Signs	Morgan Hess	
2002	Igby Goes Down	10-Year-Old Igby	
2003	It Runs in the Family	Eli Gromberg	
2004	Mean Creek	Sam Merric	
2005	The Zodiac	Johnny Parish	
2005	The Chumscrubber	Charlie Stifle	
2005	Down in the Valley	Lonnie	
2006	The Night Listener	Pete D. Logand	
2008	Chasing 3000	Roger	
2008	Lymelife	Scott	
2010	Twelve	Chris	
2011	Hick	Clement	
2011	Scream 4	Charlie Walker	
2012	Electrick Children	Clyde	
2014	Gabriel	Gabriel	
2015	Intruders	Dan Cooper	
2016	Jack Goes Home	Jack	
2016	Welcome to Willits	Possum	
2017	Columbus	Gabriel	
2017	The Song of Sway Lake	Ollie	
2017	Bullet Head	Gage	
2018	Lords of Chaos	Euronymous	
2020	Materna	Gabe	
2021	The Last Thing Mary Saw	The Intruder	
2024	5lbs of Pressure	Mike	
2024	Dead Money	Uncle Ronnie / Revolver	
2025	Dear Shop Girl	Customer	

=== Television ===
Year	Title	Role	Notes
2001	Off Season	Jackson Mayhew	Television film
2001–2002	The Job	Davey McNeil	2 episodes
2002	The Twilight Zone	Craig Hansen	Episode: "Azoth the Avenger Is a Friend of Mine"
2003	Law & Order: Special Victims Unit	Joe Blaine	Episode: "Manic"
2017–2018	Sneaky Pete	Gavin	2 episodes
2018	Waco	David Thibodeau	6 episodes
2018	Castle Rock	Willie	4 episodes
2019	City on a Hill	Clay Roach	5 episodes
2020	The Expecting	Tyler	9 episodes
2020	50 States of Fright	Older Aiden	2 episodes
2021	Halston	Joel Schumacher	Episode: "Becoming Halston"
2022	Under the Banner of Heaven	Samuel Lafferty	7 episodes
2023	Swarm	Marcus	Episode: "Stung"
2023	Black Mirror	Kappa	Episode: "Beyond the Sea"
2026	Nocturne	Karl	Upcoming series
