= Holy Sepulchre Cemetery (New Rochelle, New York) =

Cemetery in New Rochelle, New York, United States

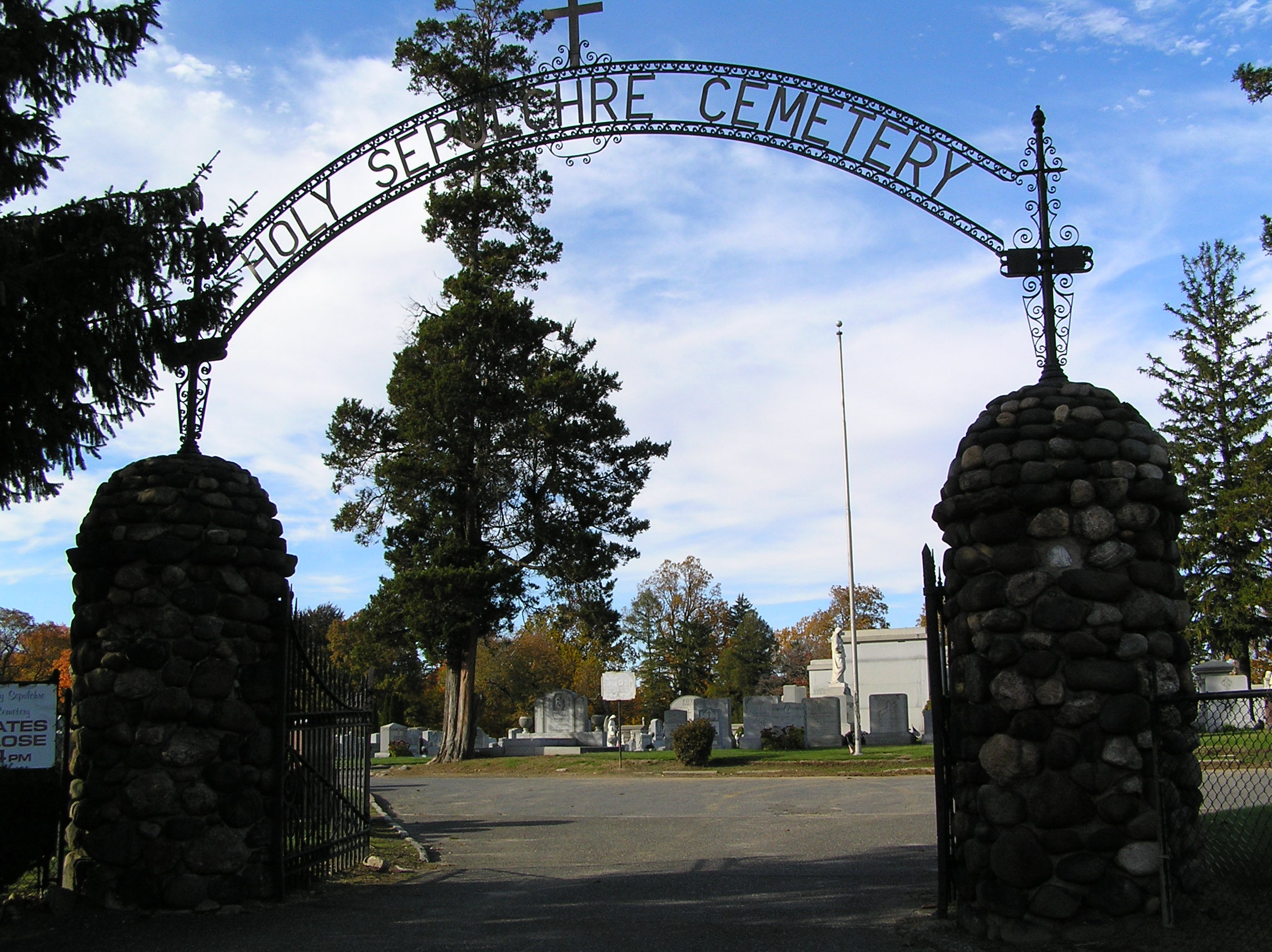
- The main entrance to Holy Sepulchre Cemetery
- Interactive map of Holy Sepulchre Cemetery

Details
- Established: 1886
- Location: New Rochelle, New York, United States
- Coordinates: 40°54′13″N 73°47′51″W
- Type: Catholic
- Owned by: Blessed Sacrament Church
- Find a Grave: Holy Sepulchre Cemetery

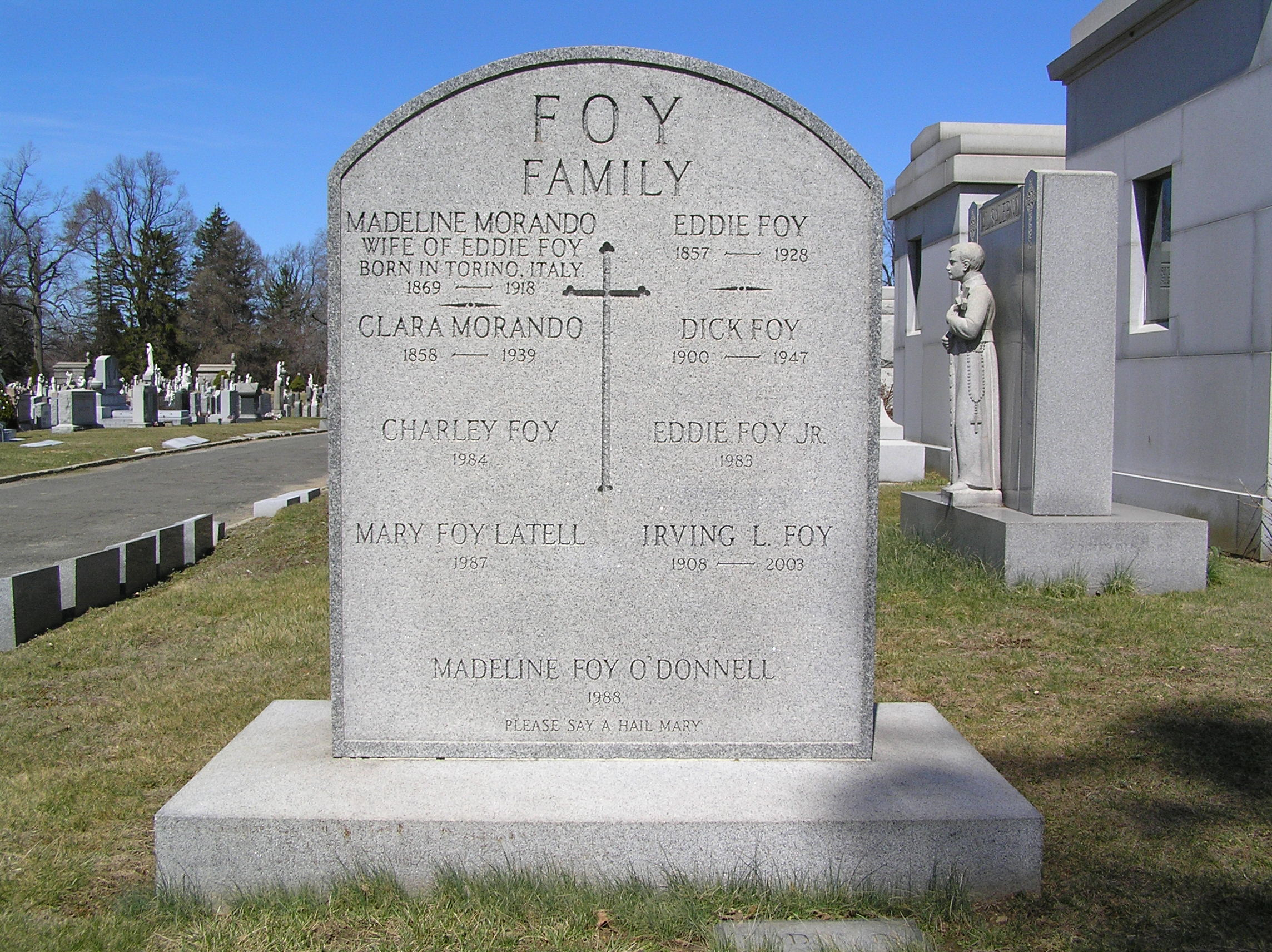
Foy family headstone

Holy Sepulchre Cemetery is a Catholic cemetery in New Rochelle in Westchester County, New York, United States. The cemetery is maintained by the Blessed Sacrament Church, whose pastor, Father McLoughlin, established it in 1886.

Holy Sepulchre Cemetery is the resting place of notables including Eddie Foy and his family of famous Vaudeville actors and actresses, memorialized in the 1955 film The Seven Little Foys.

== Notable interments ==
- Richard Beddows (1843–1922), Civil War Congressional Medal of Honor Recipient.
- Charley Foy (1898–1984), actor
- Eddie Foy Jr. (Edwin Fitzgerald), (1905–1983), actor
- Eddie Foy Sr. (Edwin Fitzgerald), (1856–1928), actor
- Irving Foy (1909–2003), actor
- Madeline Foy (1906–1988), actress
- Mary Foy (1901–1987), actress
- Richard Foy (1905–1947), actor
- Harry Tierney (1890–1965), composer

== See also ==
- Beechwoods Cemetery (New Rochelle, New York)
