= Madeline Foy =

American actress and vaudevillian

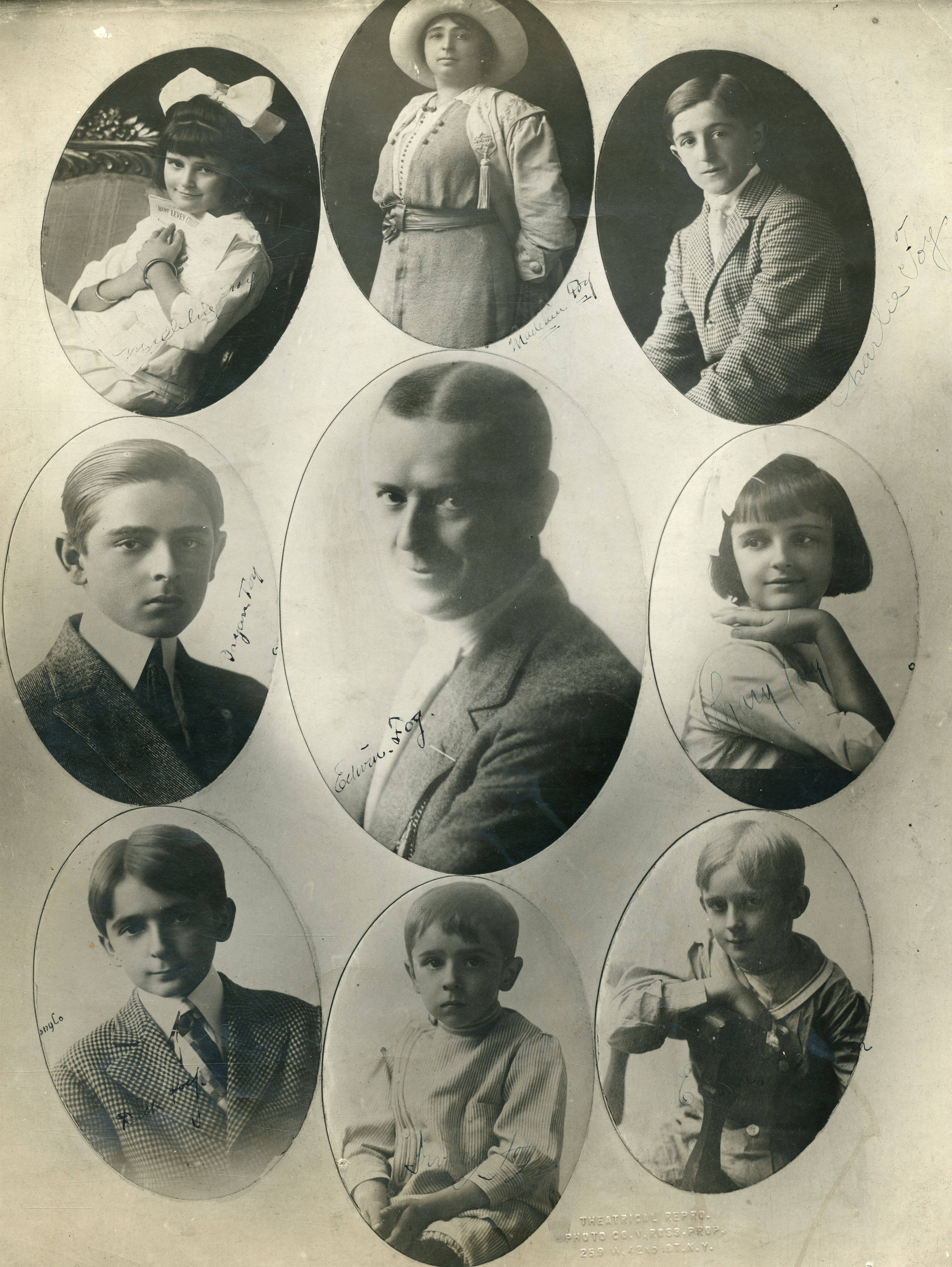
- Eddie Foy, his wife Madeline, and the Seven Little Foys. Madeline Foy is center-right.
- Born: September 21, 1903; New York City, New York, U.S.
- Died: July 5, 1988 (aged 84); Los Angeles, California, U.S.
- Resting place: Holy Sepulchre Cemetery, New Rochelle, New York
- Occupations: Actress, entertainer
- Years active: 1912–1967
- Spouse: William F. O'Donnell (m. 1928)
- Parent(s): Eddie Foy (father); Madeline Morando (mother)
- Relatives: Bryan Foy (brother); Charley Foy (brother); Eddie Foy Jr. (brother); Mary Foy (sister); Richard Foy (brother); Irving Foy (brother)

Madeline Foy (September 21, 1903 - July 5, 1988) was an American vaudeville actress and entertainer. She was the fourth of the seven surviving children of vaudevillian Eddie Foy and performed as part of the family act, Eddie Foy and the Seven Little Foys from childhood. She later appeared in small roles in Hollywood films during the late 1950s and 1960s.

== Early life and family ==
Madeline Foy was born on September 21, 1903, in New York City. She was the daughter of Eddie Foy (born Edwin Fitzgerald, 1856–1928), one of the most celebrated comic performers in American vaudeville, and his third wife, Madeline Morando, an Italian dancer. Eleven children were born to the couple, of whom seven survived childhood: Bryan (1896–1977), Charley (1898–1984), Mary (1901–1987), Madeline (1903–1988), Eddie Jr. (1905–1983), Richard (1905–1947), and Irving (1908–2003).

The family was based in New Rochelle, New York, where Eddie Foy Sr. had purchased a large house he called "The Foyer."

== Vaudeville career ==
Eddie Foy Sr. first brought his children onto the vaudeville stage together in August 1912, and by 1913 the family started its first touring season. Madeline's mother, Madeline Morando Foy, traveled with the act until her death in 1918. The act, billed as Eddie Foy and the Seven Little Foys, performed for a decade and achieved wide popularity, particularly during the First World War years.

In 1928, following their father's death, six of the seven siblings appeared in a Vitaphone sound short produced by Warner Bros., Chips of the Old Block (Vitaphone reel #2580), directed by their brother Bryan Foy. In the short, Madeline and her sister Mary sang the song I Just Roll Along, accompanied by their brother Richard on guitar. Bryan Foy, who had moved into film direction, did not appear on screen.

The family group disbanded after Eddie Foy Jr. started a solo career and several of the siblings married. The family's act was featured in the 1955 movie, The Seven Little Foys, starring Bob Hope. Madeline was portrayed by Linda Bennett.

== Later life ==
Madeline Foy's film career consisted of supporting roles in the late 1950s and 1960s. In 1958 she appeared as a WAAC sergeant in Jet Attack, a low-budget Korean War drama directed by Edward L. Cahn and produced by American International Pictures. The same year she played Mary, a Texas Ranger's secretary, in The Bonnie Parker Story, a film directed by William Witney and starring Dorothy Provine as the outlaw Bonnie Parker. In 1967 she appeared in the Italian production Fai in fretta ad uccidermi... ho freddo! as Alice.

During the 1960s, Madeline also worked at her brother Charles' supper clubs.

== Personal life ==
Madeline Foy married William Francis O'Donnell on July 19, 1928. O'Donnell worked in the film exhibition industry, serving as General Manager of Texas Consolidated Theaters, a division of Interstate Theaters. The couple had one daughter, Madeline Frances Foy O'Donnell (1929–2015). Foy died on July 5, 1988, in Los Angeles, California, at the age of 84. Her remains were interred at Holy Sepulchre Cemetery in New Rochelle, New York, alongside her father and several of her siblings.

== Filmography ==
Year	Title	Role	Notes
1928	Chips of the Old Block	Herself	Vitaphone short; directed by Bryan Foy
1958	Jet Attack	WAAC Sergeant	
1958	The Bonnie Parker Story	Mary, Ranger's Secretary	
1967	Fai in fretta ad uccidermi... ho freddo!	Alice	
