= Eddie Foy (disambiguation) =

Eddie Foy (1856–1928), was an American vaudeville actor and comedian

Eddie Foy may refer to:

- Eddie Foy Jr. (1905–1983), American character actor who was earlier one of the "Seven Little Foys"
- Eddie Foy III (1935–2018), American actor and film director
