= Curtis Dennis =

American basketball player

Free agent
- Position: Shooting guard / small forward

Personal information
- Born: January 15, 1988 (age 38) Bronx, New York, U.S.
- Listed height: 6 ft 5 in (1.96 m)
- Listed weight: 205 lb (93 kg)

Career information
- High school: Blessed Sacrament-St. Gabriel (New Rochelle, New York); Gulf Shores (Houston, Texas); Findlay Prep (Henderson, Nevada)
- College: New Mexico (2008–2010); Toledo (2011–2012); Iona (2012–2013)
- NBA draft: 2013: undrafted
- Playing career: 2013–2016

Career history
- 2014: Tadamon Zouk

Career highlights
- Honorable mention All-MAC (2012)

Curtis Lamont Dennis (born January 15, 1988) is a Former American professional basketball player from the Bronx, New York. He first attended the University of New Mexico, then transferred to University of Toledo, and finished his collegiate career at Iona College. In high school, he attended St. Raymond High School for Boys, than transferred to Blessed Sacrament-St. Gabriel High School where he graduated in 2006. After graduating he went to Houston Inner City Academy/Gulf Shores Academy in Houston, Texas. After completing a full year there he later transferred to Findlay Prep Academy in Henderson, Nevada. Dennis played for Tadamon Zouk in Lebanon, and is currently retired.

== Prep career ==
=== Blessed Sacrament-St. Gabriel (2004–06) ===
Blessed Sacrament-St. Gabriel High School, located in New Rochelle, New York, is where Dennis played his junior year along with cousin Jarrid Famous. The season was cut short in the playoffs against Salesian High School in the CHSAA B. Dennis averaged 13.0 points per game. His senior year he averaged 18.2 points per game and won the CHSAA B City Championship against Regis High School in Iona College Gymnasium. They followed that with a victory in the state championship game against Nichols High School in Niagara University's gymnasium. He was the most valuable player of both Championships. In The Glen Falls Federation championship, Blessed Sacrament won the first game vs Lackawanna High School but came up short against Global Studies. Blessed Sacrament Varsity Men's Basketball Team of 2005–2006 season was inducted into The New Rochelle Hall of Fame.

=== Houston Inner City Academy/Gulf Shores Academy (2006–07) ===
Following Blessed Sacrament-St. Gabriel High School Dennis did a post-graduate year at Gulf Shores Academy in Houston, Texas. He was coached by Ken "Juice" Williams (who coached NBA players Gerald Green and Darington Hobson). Dennis averaged 24.5 points per game and led the Tigers to a 45–3 record. Coach Williams said, "I call him "Captain Curt" because of his leadership abilities on and off the court. During the summer he would train unfortunate kids for free because he wanted to give back to the community. That is tremendous for his age." In summer 2007, Dennis played AAU basketball for the Houston Playmakers and Houston Elite. He became a top 25 prospect in the country due to his performances in these leagues.

=== Findlay Prep (2007–08) ===
Following the summer season, Dennis was asked to join the Findlay Prep team in Henderson, Nevada by their coaches. He joined a class of future NCAA Division I standouts in Kentucky's DeAndre Liggins, Florida State's Deividas Dulkys, UTEP's Jacques Streeter, California's Jorge Gutierrez, Seattle's Clarence Trent and UNLV's Carlos Lopez and Brice Massamba. Dennis average 13.0 points per game and shot 40% from behind the 3-point line and helped lead the Pilots to a 32–1 record and an appearance in the national prep school championship game versus Hargrave Military Academy, where the Pilots came up short. During his tenure at Findlay Prep he helped the Pilots become ranked #2 in the country, and himself became the 13th highest rated high school player in the country by Rivals.com and Scout.com. He committed and later signed a letter of intent to University of New Mexico coaches Steve Alford and Craig Neal.

== College career ==
=== University of New Mexico (2008–10) ===
Coming into the New Mexico, Dennis was part of top 10 recruiting class in the country by ESPN, Scout.com and Rivals.com. This class consisted of Phillip McDonald, Nate Garth, Will Brown, Isaiah Rusher, Curtis Dennis, and AJ Hardeman. They were ranked #9 in the country. His first year at New Mexico he red-shirted with the Lobos until the 2009–10 season. He primarily came off the bench and helped them become ranked as high as #8 in the country at one point. The Lobos won the Mountain West Conference regular season championship and earned an automatic bid into the NCAA tournament. The Lobos knocked off Montana in the first round but then lost to Washington in the ensuing round. During that season he contributed to 31 games, scoring 11 points in 14 minutes versus #10 BYU, led by Jimmer Fredette, and 14 points in 14 minutes against No.20 Texas Tech. Dennis' sophomore year he started in three games scoring 12 points in 23 minutes vs Detroit, and 7 points 3 assists vs Arizona State. He later transferred to University of Toledo to play for Tod Kowalczyk.

=== University of Toledo (2011–12) ===
Due to being a mid-year transfer he had to sit out until December, where he made his opening games vs Youngstown State University. When playing for the Toledo Rockets he was the team's second leading scorer, averaging 13.0 points per game. He averaged 27 minutes per game and shot 35% from behind the 3-point line in the non-conference season, and 39% from behind the 3-point line in the Mid-American Conference (MAC). He made 49 three-pointers during this season, with a career-high five three-pointers in a single game more than once. He scored in double figures in 17 games scoring 20 or more points twice. He was runner-up for Sixth Man of the Year in the MAC and was 2012 All-MAC Honorable Mention. He was among the leaders in the nation in steals and scored on 20 percent of Toledo's possessions. Dennis was a part of the reason the program went from a 4–28 record consecutively for four years to a 19–17 record in the 2011–12 season. They also won their first postseason game in the CollegeInsider.com Postseason Tournament.

=== Iona College (2012–13) ===
Due to NCAA sanctions and the rule of allowing seniors not to be held accountable, Dennis was able to transfer to Iona College in the Metro Atlantic Athletic Conference (MAAC). After losing two big players Scott Machado and Mike Glover from Iona's 2012 season it was clear they needed to add a few pieces to relive that run. Head coach Tim Cluess felt Dennis would be a good piece to that equation in joining Lamont Jones and Sean Armand. Dennis helped the Iona Gaels go 20–14 in 2012–13. He helped the team to win the 2013 MAAC tournament championship against Manhattan College to earn a bid in NCAA Tournament. Iona lost to Ohio State in the opening round.

== Professional career ==
In January 2014 Curtis Dennis signed to a Lebanon Basketball Team Tadamon Zouk with cousin Jarrid Famous. In 2016 Curtis retired from the game of basketball.
