= Dottley =

Dottley is a surname. Notable people with the surname include:

- Jason Dottley (born 1980), American actor, singer, writer, director, and producer
- Kayo Dottley (1928–2018), American football player
