= Eddie Foy =

19th- and 20th-century American actor

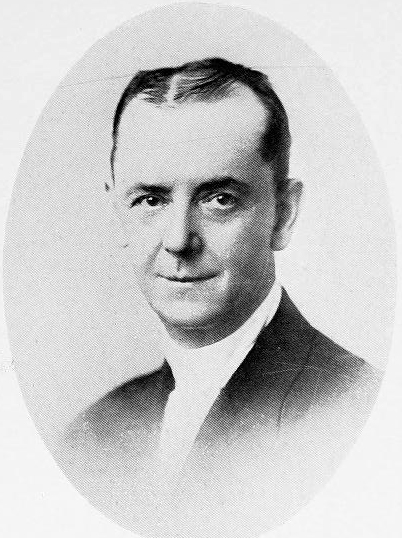
- Foy in 1912
- Born: Edwin Fitzgerald; March 9, 1856; Manhattan, New York City, US
- Died: February 16, 1928 (aged 71); Kansas City, Missouri, US
- Occupation: Actor
- Children: Bryan Foy 1896–1977; Charley Foy 1898–1984; Richard Foy 1899–1947; Mary Foy 1901–1987; Madeline Foy 1903–1988; Eddie Foy Jr. 1905–1983; Irving Foy 1908–2003

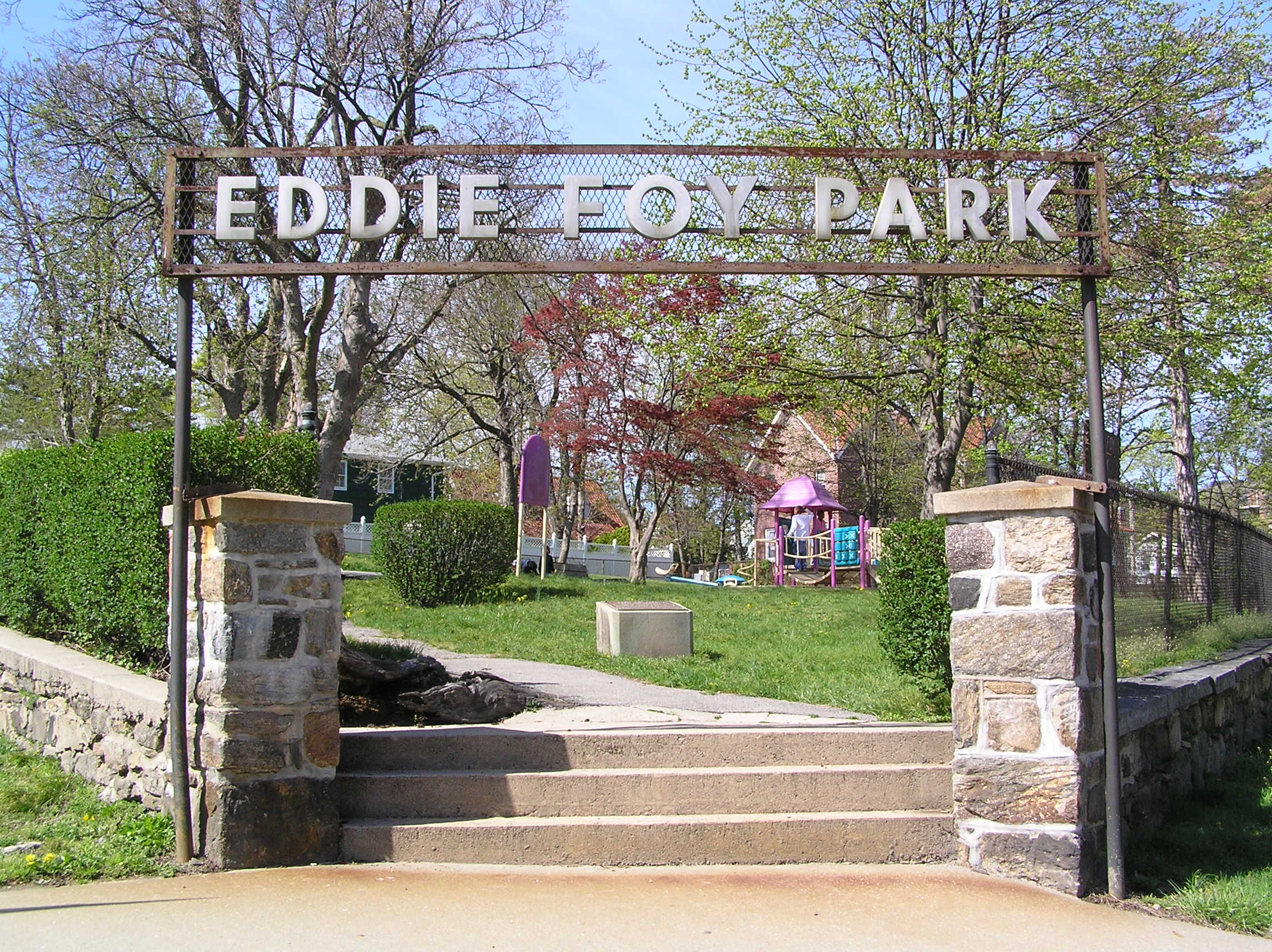
Eddie Foy Park at the corner of Weyman Avenue and Pelham Road in New Rochelle, New York

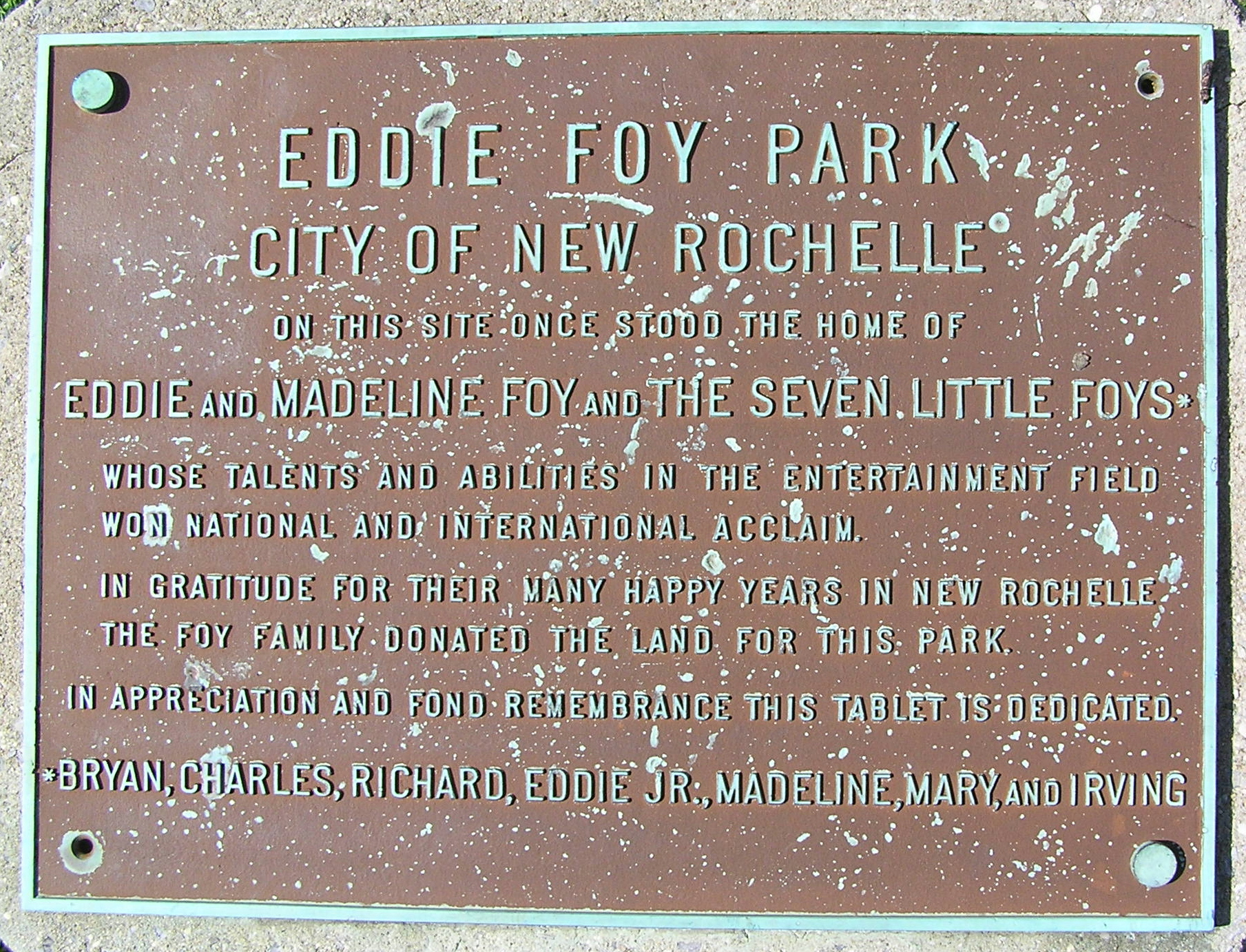
Plaque in Eddie Foy Park: "in gratitude for their many happy years in New Rochelle the Foy Family donated the land for this park."

Edwin Fitzgerald (March 9, 1856 – February 16, 1928), known professionally as Eddie Foy and Eddie Foy Sr., was an American actor, comedian, dancer and vaudevillian.

== Early years ==
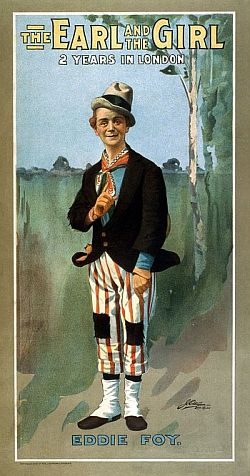
Poster from The Earl and the Girl, 1905

Foy's parents, Richard and Mary Fitzgerald, emigrated to the United States from Ireland in 1855 and lived first in New York City's Bowery neighborhood and then in Greenwich Village, where Eddie was born. After Richard died in an insane asylum in 1862 from syphilis-induced dementia, Mary took their four children (Eddie was second oldest) to Chicago, where at one time she reportedly tended the mentally ill widow of Abraham Lincoln.

Six-year-old Eddie began performing in the streets and local saloons to support his family. At 15 he began to use the stage name Foy, and with a partner began dancing in bars, traveling throughout the western United States. He worked for a time as a supernumerary in theatrical productions, sharing a stage at times with such leading men of the time as Edwin Booth and Joseph Jefferson. With another partner, Jim Thompson, Foy went west again and gained his first professional recognition in mining camps and cow towns. In one such town, Dodge City, Kansas, Foy and his partner lingered for some time and Foy became acquainted with notable citizens Wyatt Earp, Bat Masterson, and Doc Holliday. In later years, Foy told of an altercation over a girl with fellow actor Charles Chaplin (not the later film star), who was drunkenly taking pot-shots at Foy. The gunfire awakened Wyatt Earp, who disarmed the actor and sent both the players home to sleep it off. Foy is also rumored to have been in Tombstone, Arizona, in October 1881, appearing at the Birdcage Theater when the Gunfight at the O.K. Corral occurred on the 26th of that month.

In 1879, Foy married Rose Howland, one of the singing Howland Sisters, who were traveling the same circuit. Three years later, Foy and troupe relocated to Philadelphia and joined the Carncross Minstrels. That same year Rose died in childbirth, as did the child she was delivering. Foy lingered with the troupe for two seasons and then returned to the road. He joined David Henderson's troupe and traveled all around the U.S., dancing, doing comedy, and acting in farces. In San Francisco, still in 1882, he met Lola Sefton and was romantically involved with her for ten years until her death in 1894; the two never married, but had a daughter named Catherine who was raised by Foy's sister, Mary.

== Return to Chicago ==
Foy returned to Chicago in 1888 as the star comedian in variety shows and revues, initially for his own company. In 1889 he had a tremendous success as the star of the musical Blue Beard, Jr. when it premiered at the Grand Opera House, Chicago He then toured with that production nationally; including stops at Boston's Tremont Theatre (1889) and Broadway's Niblo's Garden (1890). He also played the variety circuits for years in a series of song and dance acts.

In 1896, Foy married his third wife, Madeline Morando, a dancer with his company. She gave him eleven children, of whom seven survived childhood: Bryan (1896–1977); Charley (1898–1984); Mary (1901–1987); Madeline (1903–1988); Eddie Jr. (1905–1983); Richard (1905–1947); and Irving (1908–2003). Eddie Jr.'s son, Eddie Foy III, was a casting director with Columbia Pictures for over 40 years.

Between 1901 and 1912, Foy played the leading comic roles in a series of musical comedies in New York City and on tour, including The Strollers (1901), The Wild Rose (1902), Mr. Bluebeard (1903), Piff! Paff!! Pouf!!! (1904), The Earl and the Girl (1905), The Orchid (1907), Mr Hamlet of Broadway (1908/9), Up and Down Broadway (1910), and Over the River (1912). It was while on tour with Mr. Bluebeard that he became a hero of Chicago's infamous Iroquois Theatre fire, December 30, 1903. A malfunctioning spotlight set fire to the scenery backstage, and Foy stayed onstage until the last minute, trying to keep the audience from panicking. Survivors later praised Foy for his bravery in trying to keep the crowd calm, even as burning debris fell onto the stage all around him. The theater's safety features were inadequate, the theater personnel untrained, and some of the exits locked from the outside, and at least 600 people died. Foy escaped by crawling through a sewer.

== Eddie Foy and The Seven Little Foys ==
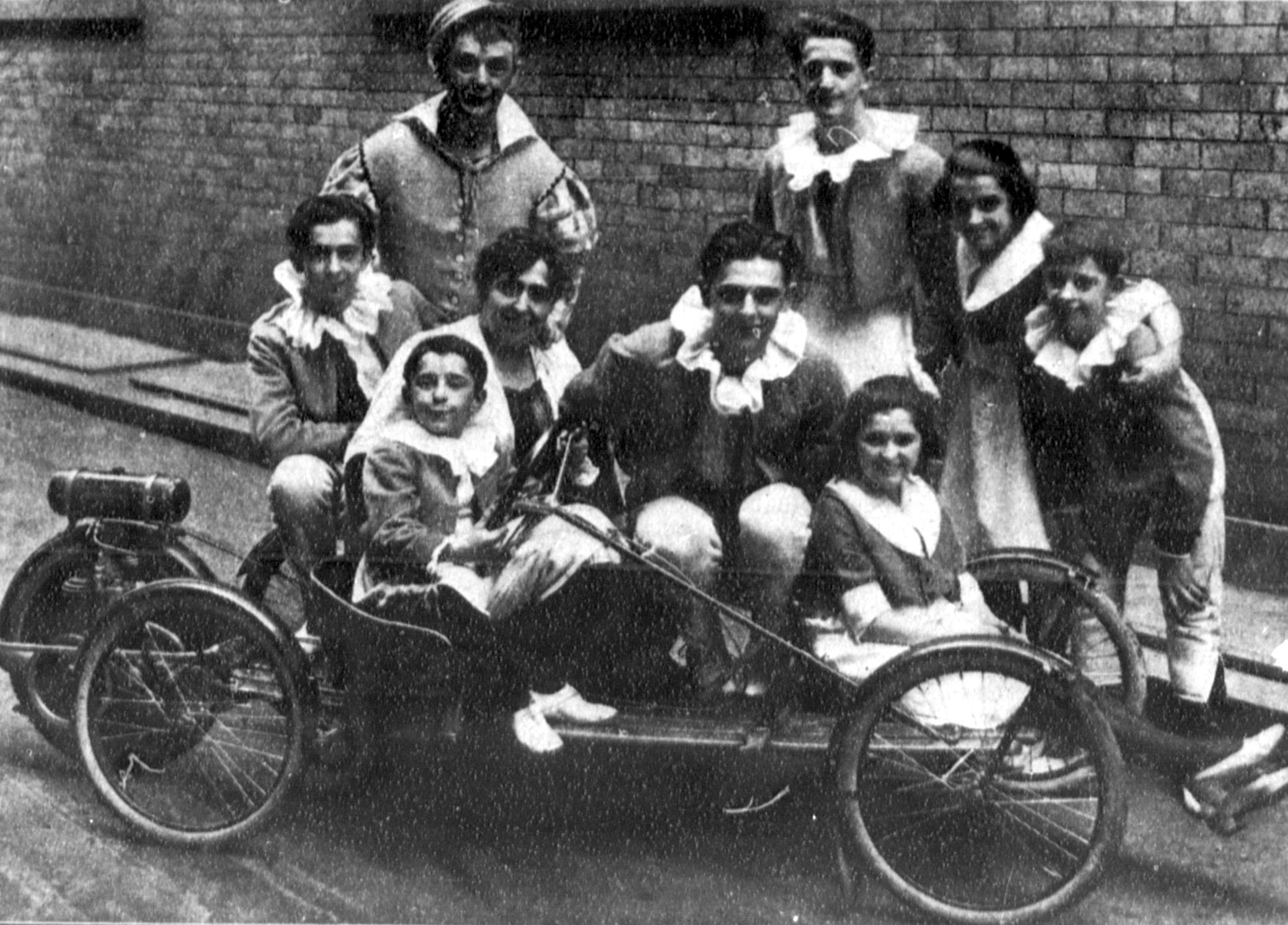
Eddie Foy Sr. and the other Foys, 1919

Between 1910 and 1913, he formed a family vaudeville act, "Eddie Foy and The Seven Little Foys", which quickly became a national sensation. While Foy was a stern disciplinarian backstage, he portrayed an indulgent father onstage, and the Foys toured successfully for over a decade, appearing in one motion picture. His wife Madeline died in 1918. The children began to go their separate ways after Foy married Marie Reilly Coombs in 1923, but four of the younger children (Charley, Mary, Madeline and Irving) performed together until the mid 1930s. Foy continued to appear in vaudeville and starred in the hit Broadway comedy The Fallen Star in 1927. He died of a heart attack while headlining on the Orpheum circuit in Kansas City, Missouri, at age 71.

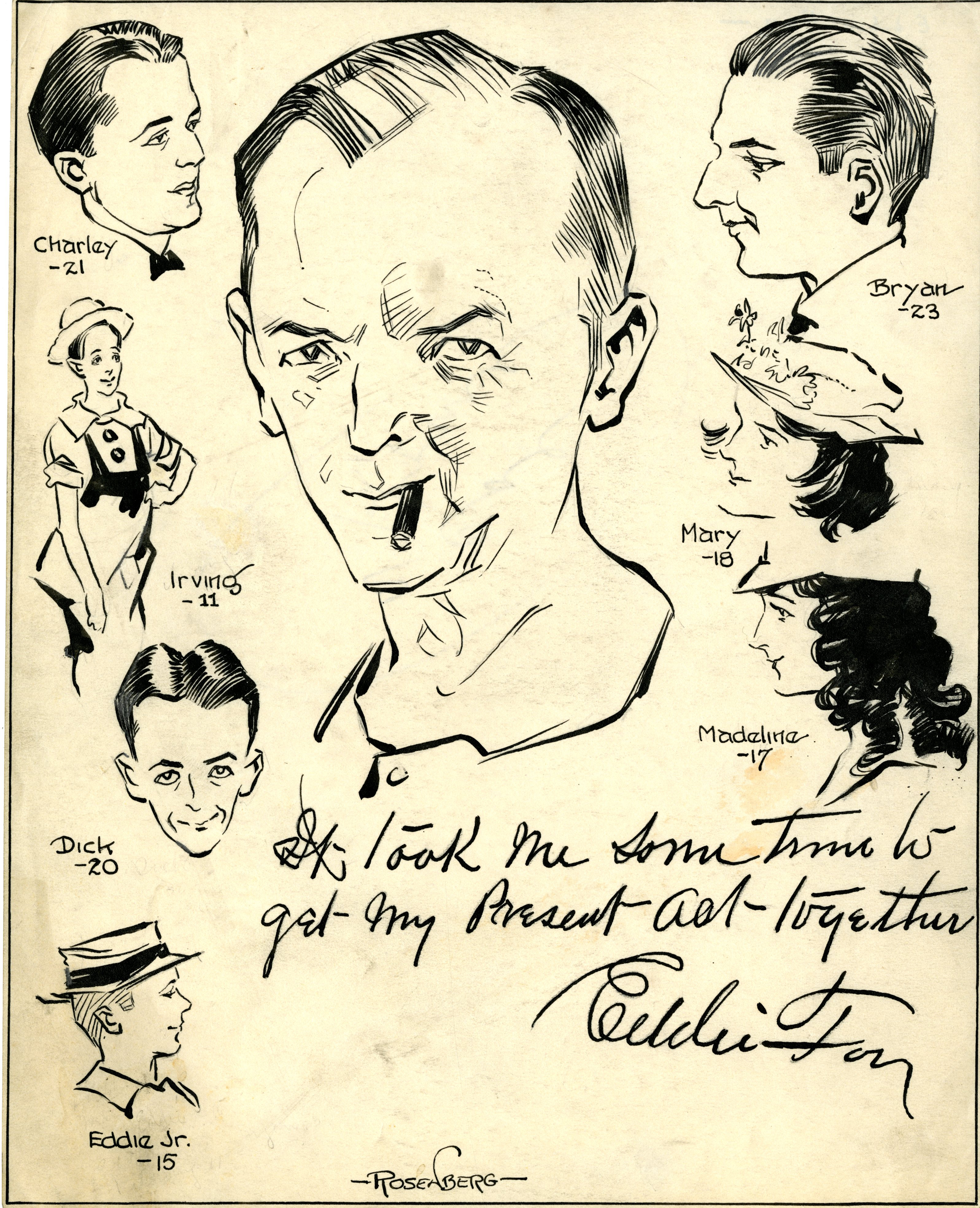
Manuel Rosenberg autographed sketches of Eddie Foy and the Seven Little Foys, 1920,The Cincinnati Post

The seven children reunited for a 1928 Vitaphone short #2580, "Chips of the Old Block". Six of the seven appeared onscreen, doing a portion of their song-and-dance act, and Bryan directed. The film opens with the girls singing and dancing to "I'll Just Roll Along (Havin' My Ups and Downs)" while Richard plays ukulele. Charley, Eddie Jr., and Irving then perform a comedy routine. Next, Eddie Jr. does an eccentric dance routine, there's a short song interlude, and the film ends with soft shoe routine in which each has a solo bit.

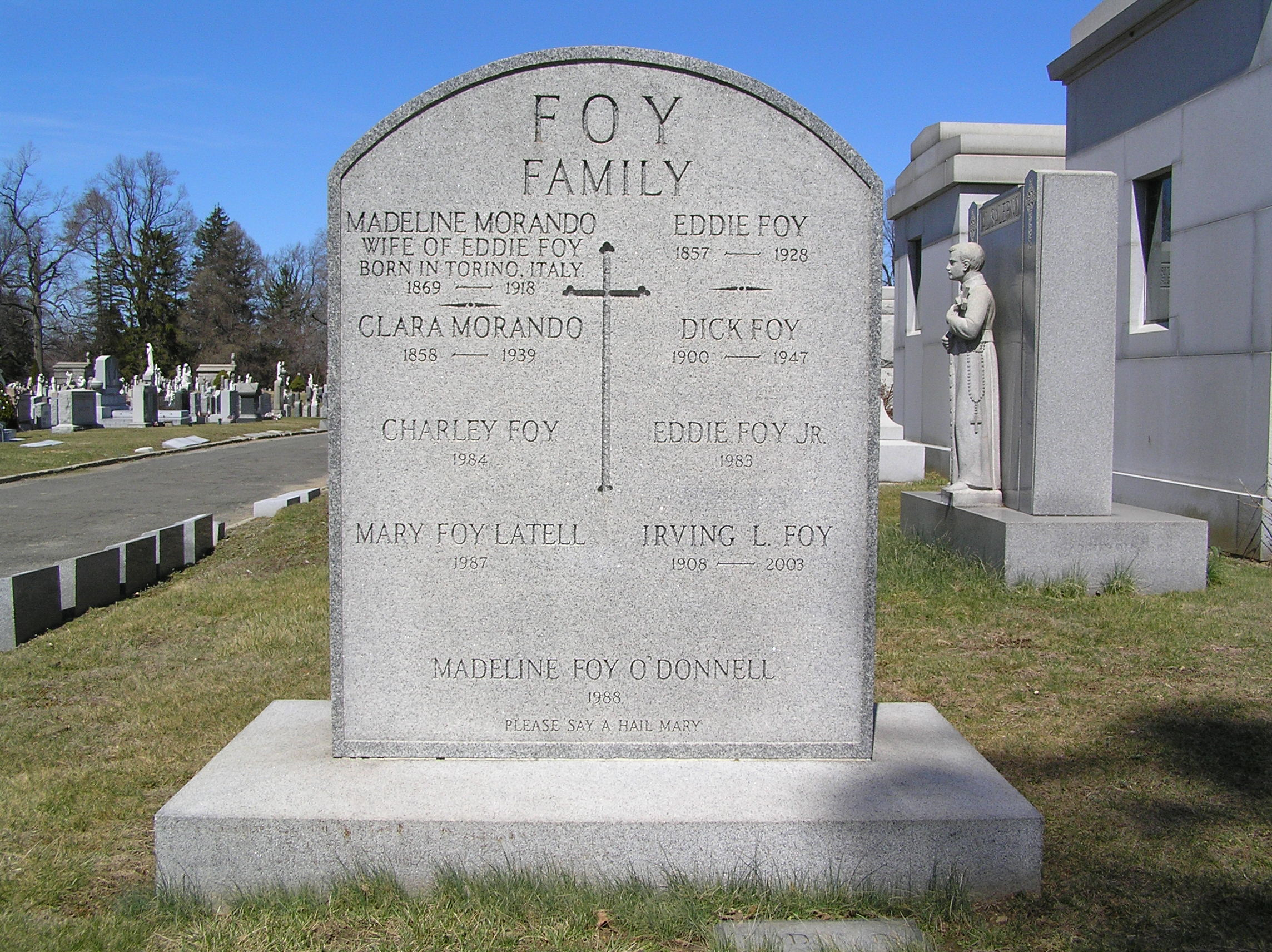
The headstone of Eddie Foy in Holy Sepulchre Cemetery

After the "Seven Little Foys" stopped performing together, they pursued separate careers. Eddie Foy Jr. had a successful acting career on stage and screen. Bryan composed show music, wrote for Buster Keaton, and directed and produced films in Hollywood. Richard continued to operate a theater chain business in Dallas that he had started with Foy. Irving wrote and managed cinemas in Dallas and Albuquerque. Charley and Mary operated the Charley Foy Supper Club in Sherman Oaks, California, in the San Fernando Valley, where comedians such as Jackie Gleason, Dan Rowan, Dick Martin, and Phil Silvers appeared early in their careers.

The family's story was filmed in 1955 as The Seven Little Foys with Bob Hope as Foy and James Cagney as George M. Cohan; Charley Foy narrated. Eddie Foy Jr. appeared as his father in four films – Frontier Marshal (1939), Lillian Russell (1940), Yankee Doodle Dandy (1942), and Wilson (1944) – as well as in a television version of The Seven Little Foys with Mickey Rooney as George M. Cohan (1964). The first stage musical version of The Seven Little Foys, written by Chip Deffaa, premiered at the Seven Angels Theater in Waterbury, Connecticut, in 2007. In 2008, it was revived in New York at the New York International Fringe Festival; the cast included Ryan Foy, Foy's great grandson and grandson of Irving Foy.

== Death ==
On February 16th, 1928, at age 71, Foy died of a heart attack at the Hotel Baltimore in Kansas City, Missouri. All of Foy's children except Bryan are buried with their father and mother, Madeline, at Holy Sepulchre Cemetery in New Rochelle, New York.

== See also ==
- "Clowning Through Life", Eddie Foy's autobiography, published 1928
- Iroquois Theater Fire
- Academy of Music/Riviera Theatre

== Bibliography ==
- Gänzl, Kurt (1994). The Encyclopedia of the Musical Theatre, Volume 2. Schirmer Books. ISBN 9780028714455.
