= The Swell Head =

1928 film

- Directed by: Bryan Foy
- Screenplay by: Hugh Hubert
- Starring: Eddie Foy Jr. Bessie Love
- Production company: Warner Vitaphone
- Release date: March 1928 (U.S.)
- Running time: 18 minutes; 2 reels
- Country: United States
- Language: English

The Swell Head (also known as The Swelled Head and Eddie Foy, Jr., with Bessie Love in The Swelled Head) is a 1928 American romantic musical short starring Eddie Foy Jr. and Bessie Love, directed by Foy's brother Bryan. Variety mused that "this may be the first backstage sound short."

The film is preserved at the UCLA Film & Television Archive.

== Plot ==
A young man (Foy) and woman (Love) perform a vaudeville act multiple times a day. The young man's ego makes their collaboration difficult. When he is made aware of this, he changes his ways, and the pair fall in love.

== Cast ==
- Eddie Foy Jr.
- Bessie Love
- Eugene Pallette
- Claude Sanders
- James T. Mack

== Soundtrack ==
- "Cielito Lindo"
- "The Skaters' Waltz"
- "Turkey in the Straw"
- "Espanito"
- "Spring Song"

== Production ==
A plagiarism lawsuit was filed against the studio.

== Release and reception ==
Though it was a short film, because it was a sound film, it headlined at some theaters. The film had its New York premiere at the Strand Theatre.

Foy and Love received high praise for their performances, and the film left open the possibility for sequel shorts.
