= Richard Beddows =

- Born: June 27, 1843; Liverpool, England
- Died: February 15, 1922 (aged 78)
- Burial place: New Rochelle, New York
- Military career
- Allegiance: United States of America
- Branch: United States Army
- Service years: 1861 - 1865
- Rank: Private
- Unit: (New York (state)) 34th New York Battery
- Conflicts: Battle of Spotsylvania Courthouse
- Awards: Medal of Honor

Private Richard Beddows (June 27, 1843 to February 15, 1922) was a British soldier who fought in the American Civil War. Beddows was awarded the United States' highest award for bravery during combat, the Medal of Honor, for his action in Spotsylvania, Virginia during the Battle of Spotsylvania Courthouse on 18 May 1864. He was honored with the award on July 10, 1896.

== Biography ==
Beddows was born in Liverpool, England on 27 June 1843. He enlisted in the army in August 1861, and mustered out with his battery in June 1865. He died on 15 February 1922, and his remains were interred at the Holy Sepulchre Cemetery in New Rochelle, New York.

== Medal of Honor citation ==
Brought his guidon off in safety under a heavy fire of musketry after he had lost it by his horse becoming furious from the bursting of a shell.

== See also ==
- List of American Civil War Medal of Honor recipients: A–F
