= Chip Deffaa =

American author and dramatist

- Born: United States
- Occupations: Author, director, playwright, producer

Chip Deffaa is an American author, playwright, screenwriter, jazz historian, singer, songwriter, director, and producer of plays and recordings. For 18 years, he wrote for the New York Post, covering jazz, cabaret, and theater. He has contributed to Jazz Times, The Mississippi Rag, Down Beat, Cabaret Scenes, England's Crescendo, and Entertainment Weekly. He's written nine books and 20 plays, and has produced more than 40 albums. As D.A. Bogdnov noted in a lengthy profile of Deffaa ("A Walk in the Woods with Playwright Chip Deffaa...") published in TheaterScene.net on December 5, 2022, Deffaa "has produced more recordings of George M. Cohan songs than anyone living, just as he's produced more recordings of Irving Berlin songs than anyone living. And having produced more than 40 albums in total now, Deffaa has surely recorded more members of New York's theater/cabaret community than anyone living." He was born in New Rochelle, New York. Mentored by former vaudevillian Todd Fisher and studying at the American Academy of Dramatic Arts in his youth, Deffaa became hooked on show business while performing as a child actor. His interests evolved into writing. He wrote his first play and first song at age 17. He graduated from Princeton University. He freelanced for various publications before finding a longtime home at The New York Post, where editors V.A. Musetto, Matt Diebel, Steve Cuozzo, and Faye Penn gave him wide latitude to write about jazz, cabaret, classic pop, and theater.

== Career ==
Deffaa wrote and directed George M. Cohan Tonight! off-Broadway in New York at the Irish Repertory Theatre. The cast album was released in 2006 by Sh-K-Boom/Ghostlight Records. George M. Cohan Tonight! opened September 21, 2010, at the New Players Theater on the West End in London/ Deffaa directed a production of George M. Cohan Tonight! starring Jon Peterson—star of the original Off-Broadway production—in Seoul, Korea in July 2016. The film adaptation of George M. Cohan Tonight! (by Peterson and Deffaa), made in 2022, has been honored at 19 film festivals and has recently acquired a distributor, according to the December 2022 profile of Deffaa in TheaterScene.net.

After several regional productions, One Night with Fanny Brice was produced Off-Broadway in New York at St. Luke's Theatre, 308 W. 46th Street; previews began on March 16, 2011; the official opening night was April 3, 2011. A revised version of the show opened at The 13th Street Repertory Theatre, 50. W. 13th St., NYC, on April 22, 2013. The cast album of One Night with Fanny Brice was released in September 2010 by Original Cast Records.

In 2002 he produced The Chip Deffaa Invitational Theater Festival, taking over two theaters on 42nd Street in NYC to present, with support from Chashama, more than 25 theatrical productions in a six-week period, featuring Jon Peterson, Laurence O'Keefe, Brett Kristofferson, Peter-Michael Marino, Okey Chenoweth, Celia Keenan-Bolger, Dawne Swearingen, Karen Oberlin, Deb Rabbai, and more.

For many years, Deffaa's base in New York City was the venerable 13th Street Repertory Theater. Its longtime artistic director, Edith O'Hara (1917–2020), gave Deffaa carte blanche to develop and mount at her theater any shows he wished to write and direct, and she presented productions of many Deffaa shows, including Irving Berlin's America, Irving Berlin: In Person, Mad About the Boy, Theater Boys, and One Night with Fanny Brice. Deffaa's The Irving Berlin Ragtime Revue "broke box-office records at the 13th Street Repertory Theater" (as reported by Stephi Wild in Broadwayworld.com, March 24, 2020).

Asked by interviewer D. A. Bogdanov in TheaterScene.net (Dec. 5, 2022) to name "one thing you especially like about your work," Deffaa responded, "I've gotten to work with first-rate talents: Carol Channing, Betty Buckley, Steve Ross, Anita Gillette, Stephen Bogardus, Santino Fontana, John Tartaglia, Jeff Harnar--you name 'em! I'm very grateful. I've also gotten to see some wonderful newcomers who've worked with me, like Seth Sikes and Analise Scarpaci, go on to great success."

For many years, Deffaa has occasionally sung on albums, and at clubs and festivals (from Jim Caruso's "Cast Party" at Birdland Jazz Club to appearances at the Louis Armstrong Foundation's Jazz Jams at Flushing Town Hall in Queens, New York, hosted by Carol Sudhalter). On his vocal album Chip Deffaa's Tin Pan Alley, he sings old-time favorites (including songs he learned from Carol Channing and George Burns), joined by such guest stars as Molly Ryan, Jon Peterson, Olivia Chun, Michael Townsend Wright, and Logan & Lawson Saby, with accompaniment by Richard Danley and Andy Stein. The album includes the first studio recording ever made of George M. Cohan's final statement on life, "Life is Like a Musical Comedy," an unpublished song that Deffaa found among the Cohan papers at the Museum of the City of New York. Deffaa's next vocal album, Chip Deffaa: The Good Old Bad Old Days, is in preparation now. Deffaa's two-CD set The Chip Deffaa Songbook features 40 of Deffaa's theater songs, performed by Giuseppe Bausilio, Matthew Nardozzi, Seth Sikes, Jon Peterson, Keith Anderson, Beth Bartley, George Franklin, Santino Fontana, and other Broadway and cabaret artists, with spoken words by Carol Channing. Deffaa commented upon its release: "I often think I'm the luckiest guy on Earth. I've gotten to write shows for, and work with, performers I really love. It's really a joy to have so many members of my 'musical family' on one album...." ("Chip Deffaa Releases 'The Chip Deffaa Songbook'" by Ashlee Latimer, Broadwayworld.com, Nov. 27, 2016).

Deffaa also lectures on theater and jazz. His 2007 lectures in Korea, timed to coincide with the opening of one of his plays there, were sponsored by the US State Department. Deffaa has written liner notes for albums by Chase Baird, Count Basie, Ray Brown, Ruth Brown, Miles Davis, Benny Goodman, Scott Hamilton, Dick Hyman, Jon-Erik Kellso, Tito Puente, Randy Sandke, Diane Schuur, Maxine Sullivan, and Frank Vignola.

He is a member of the Stage Directors & Choreographers Society, the Dramatists Guild, ASCAP, NARAS, the Jazz Journalists Association, the F. Scott Fitzgerald Society, the Drama Desk, the American Theatre Critics Association, and is a trustee of the Princeton Tiger magazine.

Deffaa won an ASCAP Foundation Deems Taylor/Virgil Thompson Award in 1993, a New Jersey Press Association Award, and an IRNE Award (Independent Reviewers of New England).

- "Chip Deffaa: Musical Archeologist Digs Irving Berlin and Others" by Rob Lester, Cabaret Scenes magazine, March–April 2017
- "A Walk in the Woods with Playwright Chip Deffaa, his Deer, and the Ghost of George M. Cohan" by D. A. Bogdanov, TheaterScene.net, December 5, 2022.

== Books ==
- Swing Legacy ISBN 0-8108-2282-2
- Voices of the Jazz Age ISBN 0-252-01681-5
- In the Mainstream ISBN 0-8108-2558-9
- Traditionalists and Revivalists in Jazz ISBN 0-8108-2704-2
- Jazz Veterans ISBN 1-879384-28-0
- Blue Rhythms ISBN 0-306-80919-2
- C'mon Get Happy with David Cassidy ISBN 0-446-39531-5
- F. Scott Fitzgerald: The Princeton Years (as editor) ISBN 1-879384-29-9
- Max's Grand Adventure ISBN 978-166789-026-5

As contributor

- Harlem Speaks ISBN 978-1-4022-0436-4
- Roaring at One Hundred ISBN 0-914703-01-3

== Plays ==
- George M. Cohan & Co. (Eldridge Plays)
- George M. Cohan: In his Own Words ISBN 0-573-63039-9 (Samuel French)
- Irving Berlin's America (Steele Spring Stage Rights)
- Irving Berlin: In Person (Leicester Bay Theatricals)
- The Irving Berlin Story (Leicester Bay Theatricals)
- Mad About the Boy (Garret Mountain Press)
- One Night with Fanny Brice (Leicester Bay Theatricals)
- The Fanny Brice Story (Leicester Bay Theatricals)
- Presenting Fanny Brice: The Original Funny Girl (Eldridge Plays)
- Song-and-Dance Kids (Leicester Bay Theatricals)
- The Family that Sings Together... (Drama Source)
- The George M. Cohan Revue (Samuel French)
- The Irving Berlin Ragtime Revue (Leicester Bay Theatricals)
- The Johnny Mercer Jamboree (Garret Mountain Press)
- The Seven Little Foys (Leicester Bay Theatricals)
- Theater Boys (Garret Mountain Press)
- Yankee Doodle Boy ISBN 978-0-87440-080-9 (Drama Source)
- Yankee Doodle Dandy (Leicester Bay Theatricals)
- Say it With Music: The Irving Berlin Saga (Steele Spring Stage Rights)
- George M. Cohan Tonight! (Steele Spring Stage Rights)

== Discography ==
- Chip Deffaa's Tin Pan Alley: Songs I Sing to My Deer (Garret Mountain)
- Chip Deffaa's The George M. Cohan Songbook (Garret Mountain)
- Chip Deffaa's Irving Berlin: Love Songs and Such (Garret Mountain)
- Chip Deffaa's The Irving Berlin Duets Album--Volume One (Garret Mountain)
- Chip Deffaa's Irving Berlin: Sweet and Hot (Garret Mountain)
- Chip Deffaa's Say it with Music: The Irving Berlin Saga--the Cast Album (Garret Mountain)
- Chip Deffaa's An Irving Berlin Travelogue (Garrret Mountain)
- Chip Deffaa's Gay Love (Garret Mountain)
- Chip Deffaa's Irving Berlin & Co.: The Original Cast Album (Garret Mountain)
- Chip Deffaa's Irving Berlin Ragtime Rarities (Garret Mountain)
- Chip Deffaa's Irving Berlin Ragtime Revue: The Original Cast Album (Garret Mountain)
- Chip Deffaa's Irving Berlin Rediscovered: Rare Songs of Love and Longing (Garret Mountain)
- Chip Deffaa's Irving Berlin Revisited: Rare Songs of Love, Loss, and Revenge (Garret Mountain)
- Chip Deffaa's Irving Berlin Songbook: Rare and Unrecorded Songs (Garret Mountain)
- Chip Deffaa's Irving Berlin's America Co-Starring Michael Townsend Wright and Matthew Nardozzi (Garret Mountain)
- Chip Deffaa's Irving Berlin's America: The Premiere Recording Co-Starring Michael Townsend Wright and Jack Saleeby
- Chip Deffaa's Irving Berlin: In Person -- the Premiere Recording starring Jed Peterson (Garret Mountain)
- Chip Deffaa's Irving Berlin: In Person -- the Cast Album starring Jon Peterson (Garret Mountain)
- Chip Deffaa's Mad About the Boy: The Festival Cast Plus Special Guest Stars (Garret Mountain)
- Chip Deffaa's Mad About the Boy: The Original Cast Album: The 13th Street Theater Production (Garret Mountain)
- Chip Deffaa's One Night with Fanny Brice Starring Mary Cantoni Johnson: The New York Cast Album (Garret Mountain)
- Chip Deffaa's The Seven Little Foys: The Original Cast Album
- Chip Deffaa's Theater Boys: The Original Cast Album
- George M. Cohan: In His Own Words: Highlights from the Musical Production (42nd Street)
- George M. Cohan: Rare Original Recordings (Chip Deffaa Productions)
- Irving Berlin's America: The Original New York Production with Michael Townsend Wright and Giuseppe Bausillio (Garret Mountain)
- One Night with Fanny Brice: The Premiere Recording Starring Kimberly Faye Greenberg Original Cast
- The Chip Deffaa Songbook (Garret Mountain)
- The George M. Cohan Revue: the Cast Album (Garret Mountain)
- The Johnny Mercer Jamboree: The Original Cast Album (Original Cast Records)
- The Michael Townsend Wright Album, Produced by Chip Deffaa (Garret Mountain)
- Chip Deffaa's Broadway and Vaudeville Legends (Garret Mountain)
- Al Jolson Sings Irving Berlin (Garret Mountain)
- Al Jolson's Broadway (Garret Mountain)
- Al Jolson: King of Broadway (Garret Mountain)
- Fanny Brice: The Real Funny Girl (Garret Mountain)
- George M. Cohan: Rare Performances Curated by Chip Deffaa (Garret Mountain)
- Chip Deffaa's The Boy Next Door (Garret Mountain)
- Chip Deffaa's I Must Have that Man (Garret Mountain)
- Chip Deffaa's My Man (Garret Mountain)
- Fanny Brice: Rare and Unreleased Recordings Curated and Introduced by Chip Deffaa (Garret Mountain)
- Al Jolson: From Broadway to Hollywood (Garret Mountain)
