= Jason Dottley =

American actor (born 1980)

- Born: John Dottley, III; December 30, 1980 (age 45); Memphis, Tennessee, U.S.
- Known for: TV, music, theatre
- Notable work: Party Round the World, Pop It, It's Our Night
- Television: Sordid Lives: The Series
- Spouse: Del Shores (m. 2003; div. 2013)
- Relatives: Kayo Dottley (grandfather)
- Awards: Los Angeles Drama Critics Circle "Best Production: YELLOW"

Jason Dottley (born December 30, 1980) is an American actor, singer, writer, director, and producer. He appeared in the 2008 television series Sordid Lives: The Series in the role of actor Ty Williamson. He has charted 3 Top 25 and 2 additional Top 40 singles on Billboard dance chart.

== Early life ==
Dottley was born in Memphis, Tennessee, on December 30, 1980. He is the grandson of Chicago Bear Hall of Fame Member and Offensive Rookie of the Year in the NFL John "Kayo" Dottley. Dottley grew up in Mississippi, attending McLeod Elementary School and Florence High School in the Jackson area.

== Career ==
In 2003, he made his professional acting debut in a production of Terrence McNally's The Lisbon Traviata at the Actor's Lab in Hollywood, California.

In 2005, Dottley joined producer Alice West, at Marvel Studios Victoria Alonso, and Del Shores to form Eclectic Entertainment which was slated to produce several films and revivals of Shores' successful plays according to a story in the Advocate.

In 2008, he began a role as Ty Williamson in Sordid Lives: The Series, airing on Logo in the United States. He spent nine months in 2006 on stage at the Zephyr Theatre in Los Angeles playing Ty in the revival of Sordid Lives before producing and starring in the only national tour of the stage production. His performance was reviewed as "superbly nuanced," by Backstage West. At the same time he produced and performed in the Southern Baptist Sissies/Sordid Lives national tour. The tour placed at No. 105 on Billboard's Concert Boxscore Chart grossing over $150,000 in two days in Dallas at the Majestic Theatre.

In 2010, Dottley produced Yellow at the Coast Playhouse in West Hollywood, California, which won the Los Angeles Drama Critic's Circle Best World Premiere Play Award in 2011. He has produced and starred in major national tours with icons Rue McClanahan, Delta Burke, Caroline Rhea and Georgette Jones. Dottley produced the revival of the Del Shores play The Trials and Tribulations of a Trailer Trash Housewife, which starred Octavia Spencer.

=== Music career ===
Dottley has charted five songs on the Billboard Dance Club Hits Top 40 chart. and a Top 10 UK electropop star. His first release was "Party Round the World" in March 2010. "Party Round the World" hit No. 19 on Billboard, and was followed by "Pop It", then "It's Our Night", which all rose to the Top 25 on Billboard (US). "Pop It" became a Top 10 UK smash hit. "It's Our Night" was released in the Summer of 2013 and was his 3rd Top 25 Billboard record.

The song completed an 11-week run on the Billboard charts, became his first UK Top 20 Pop hit single, and was a Top 20 UK Pop summer hit. Dottley then released the theme song he wrote for his Love Story Project appropriately titled "Love Story" in 2013. The song was not promoted to radio or clubs, the first "fan offering" in Dottley's career. Valentine's Day in 2015 found Dottley celebrating the 30-year anniversary of Madonna's song "Crazy for You", by releasing his own cover and video re-interpretation of the iconic Madonna love ballad from the 1980s. All records combined, Dottley has spent over 44 weeks on the Billboard charts. His 2016 hit, "Cocaine and Whiskey", would be best known for its world-record setting music video for that features some of the most expensive and rare exotic luxury cars in the world, valued between $15M and $20M. The list includes: a McLaren 650, the Lamborghini Aventador, the Bentley GTR-3, the Rolls-Royce Ghost, the Ferrari 458, the Lamborghini Huracán, the Lamborghini Gallardo Spyder, and three tricked out Porsche GT3s.

In 2015, Dottley began his 20+ city tour with his first full-length one-man show Life on the gAy-List. He co-wrote and co-produced the one-man show with playwright and producer Eric Rittenhouse. The show was "Pick of the Week" in The Boston Globe on July 1, 2015.

In 2017, Dottley had his biggest US Pop Radio Top 40 hit, "Summertime" (featuring Rick Cross). It spent 5 weeks in the US Top 100 Pop Radio Charts.

Dottley was a member of 2008's Out 100 Most Influential People in LGBTQIAP+ culture, alongside Katy Perry and Guillermo Diaz. The list is compiled by Out magazine yearly, and presents the 100 most influential people in LGBT culture. In 2012, the National Don't H8 organization awarded Jason with the national recognition as the "King of Don't H8" a forever title for the National system, where he reigns with Queen of Don't H8, American Idol's Kimberly Caldwell. In November 2016, the National Don't H8 organization named Dottley their national social media representative for the 2017 year. In March 2017, Dottley was ranked as one of the 275 most influential people in LGBTI culture globally.

== Personal life ==
Dottley married playwright and TV producer Del Shores (Queer as Folk, Dharma & Greg) in 2003; the couple divorced in April 2013. Dottley briefly dated singer and performer Seth Sikes; the couple was named "the new LGBT power couple" by Instinct Magazine, but ended their relationship after eight months. During their relationship, Dottley directed three of Sikes' music videos: The Trolley Song, What's New Fire Island and Ya Got Trouble.

On November 10, 2017, the Advocate magazine reported Dottley's allegations of rape against Benny Medina. Dottley was one of only a few men to come forward during the #MeToo movement with an accusation, and credited Anthony Rapp's coming out about his #metoo story with giving him the courage to do the same. "For the record, I don’t plan on suing for money," Dottley said to the Advocate. "What I want is the truth exposed about these people so that they cannot continue to prey on people like they do. Hopefully, if enough of us continue to speak out and name names, I would hope the next time one of these power predators will think long and hard before he attempts that on somebody else because he’ll always think, I wonder if this one’s going to talk too."

Medina denied the allegation through a statement from his lawyers, saying that he "categorically denies the allegation of attempted rape."
