= Blessed Sacrament Church (New Rochelle, New York) =

Church of the Blessed Sacrament
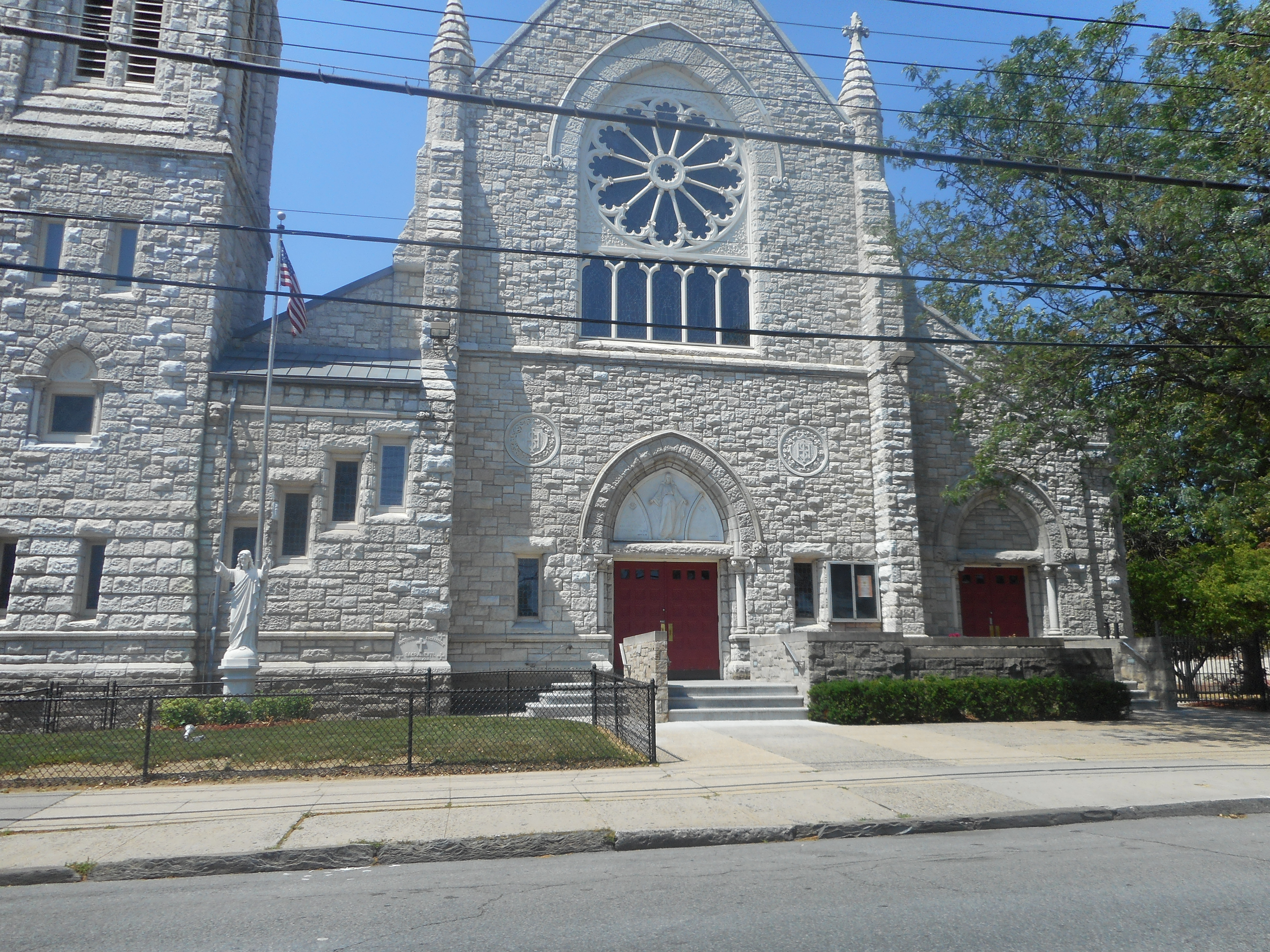
- June 2016 view of the church
- Church of the Blessed Sacrament
- 40°54′21.8″N 73°47′0.2″W
- Location: 15 Shea Place, New Rochelle, New York
- Country: United States
- Denomination: Roman Catholic
- Website: Blessed Sacrament Church

History
- Status: Parish church
- Founded: 1874
- Dedication: Blessed Sacrament

Architecture
- Functional status: Active
- Style: Gothic Revival
- Completed: 1897

Administration
- Archdiocese: Archdiocese of New York

Clergy
- Pastor: Fr Kareem Smith

The Church of the Blessed Sacrament is a Catholic parish in New Rochelle, New York. It was founded in 1874 and its present-day church building was constructed in 1897. Its predecessor, St. Matthew's Church, was founded in 1848. Blessed Sacrament Church is listed as a New Rochelle Historic Site.

As of 1998, the church served 2,000 families. It educated students in the Blessed Sacrament School until a 1985 merger with St. Gabriel's High School to form Blessed Sacrament-St. Gabriel High School, which closed in 2013. Blessed Sacrament Church also serves four local nursing homes and maintains Holy Sepulchre Cemetery.

== History ==
The first Catholic to settle in the hamlet of New Rochelle was Bernard Rooney in 1826. The first Catholic mass in the New Rochelle area was celebrated in 1836 by Rev. Eugene Cummiskey at the house of George Govers on Huguenot Street near Memorial Highway. With more Catholics settling, Irish priest Fr. Matthew Higgins from St. Raymond's Church in the Bronx petitioned Archbishop Hughes to establish a church in New Rochelle in 1845. Archbishop Hughes agreed and purchased land on Drake Avenue, in the middle of the largest settlement of Irish immigrants in New Rochelle. In 1848, the church was constructed and named St. Matthew's Church in honor of Fr. Higgins. Fr. Edward O'Reilly was assigned in 1849 as the parish's first pastor. Four years later, Fr. Thomas McLoughlin succeeded Fr. O'Reilly as pastor and opened St. Matthew's Academy, the first Catholic school in New Rochelle, which was staffed by the Sisters of Charity. However, it remained open for only one year. To accommodate more parishioners, the church was expanded in 1851. Blessed Sacrament began in 1853 with a mission to Tuckahoe, which eventually became the Immaculate Conception Church.

A smaller, wooden church dedicated as the Church of the Blessed Sacrament was also built on Centre Avenue in 1874 in response to growing population of German Catholics in the Dutch Hill section of New Rochelle. Another school was constructed five years later with bricks salvaged by parishioners from the dismantled St. Matthew's Church, which later closed for financial reasons. Fr. McLoughlin opened Holy Sepulchre Cemetery on Highland Avenue in 1886.

In 1890, lightning struck and set fire to the Blessed Sacrament church. The building was destroyed, with only the bell and cellar surviving. St. Matthew's School was used for church functions in the interim. The parish began construction on the present-day stone, Gothic Revival church, which was completed and dedicated in 1897. This building was made larger to account for a growing number of Italian immigrants now living in the West End of New Rochelle. The interior of the new church was decorated with 53 oil paintings by reputed artist Francesco Baraldi, while the depiction of the Blessed Sacrament above the altar was painting by G. Caponi.

Ursuline nuns from the College of New Rochelle began instructing children in religious education who attended public schools in 1914 and continued to do so until 1995.

Fr. McLoughlin died while saying mass at the foot of the altar in 1902 and his nephew, Fr. Thomas P. McLoughlin (who parishioners referred to as "Young Father Tom"), assumed the role of pastor. During his time, a new school building was constructed in 1923. "Old Father Tom" was buried where the church bell fell during the fire that destroyed the original wooden building.

In 1940, Fr. Matthew Delaney became pastor and founded a boys' high school, which was staffed by Christian Brothers. Msgr. Francis Shea took over as pastor in 1947. He purchased and renovated a building on Beauchamp Place in 1963, which came to be the new location of the high school. Because Msgr. Shea was well-liked in New Rochelle, Beauchamp Place was eponymously renamed Shea Place. One year later, Msgr. Shea died and was buried near Fr. McLoughlin on the grounds of the church.

The Blessed Sacrament School was merged with St. Gabriel's High School in 1985, forming Blessed Sacrament-St. Gabriel High School. At its peak, Blessed Sacrament enrolled 250 students in its elementary school, 277 students in high school and educated 600 public school students in its CCD religious education program. The school was closed in 2013 along with several other schools in Westchester County by the Archdiocese of New York.

Recognizing several structural deficiencies and the notable aesthetic value of the church, a major restoration project was undertaken by the parish with the assistance of the archdiocese in 2011, which cost just under $1 million.
