= Blessed Sacrament-St. Gabriel High School =

Blessed Sacrament-St. Gabriel High School [Closed]

Location
- 24 Shea Place; New Rochelle, (Westchester County), New York 10801; United States; 40°54′19″N 73°47′0″W

Information
- Type: Private, Coeducational
- Religious affiliation: Roman Catholic
- Closed: 2013
- Principal: Edward Sullivan
- Pastor: Msgr. William Bradley
- Faculty: 37
- Grades: 9-12
- Enrollment: 319 (2008-2009)
- Campus: Urban, Fringe of Large City
- Colors: Black and Red
- Team name: Cardinals
- Accreditation: Middle States Association of Colleges and Schools
- Athletic Director: Harry Hart and Tom Nevins
- Website: www.blessedsacstgabhs.org

Blessed Sacrament-St. Gabriel High School was a co-educational, private, Roman Catholic high school in New Rochelle, New York in Westchester County. The school was a result of the merger of Blessed Sacrament and Saint Gabriel's into one co-educational institution. The school was conducted by members of the Sisters of Charity and the Congregation of Christian Brothers together with other religious and lay persons. It was located in Blessed Sacrament Parish.

Blessed Sacrament-St. Gabriel High School permanently closed following the completion of the 2012-2013 school year. In November 2012 there was a list of schools published by the archdiocese that had the potential of being closed, but the archdiocese did not put the school on the list. When the archdiocese announced it would close, students and members of the school community were not expecting the news.

== Courses ==
The following courses constitute the program of studies at Blessed Sacrament-St. Gabriel High School

Freshmen:

- Religion: Hebrew Scriptures
- English 1
- Language Arts
- Mathematics 1,2
- Physical Education
- History: Global Studies 1
- Foreign Language: Italian 1, Spanish1
- Science: Earth Science, Living Environment
- Computers: Word Processing
- Art

Juniors:

- Religion: Christian Family Life, Christian Service
- English: English 3
- History: United States History
- Foreign Language: Italian3, Spanish3
- Mathematics: Pre-Calculus, Geomoetry, Chemistry, Physics
- Science: Earth Science, Physics
- Computers: Desktop Publishing
- Civil Liberties
- Physical Education

Sophomores:

- Religion: Life of Christ
- English 2
- History: Global Studies 2
- Foreign Language: Italian2, Spanish2
- Mathematics 2, 3
- Science: Earth Science, Living Environment
- Computers: Word Processing, Computer Application
- Elective Choices: Accounting, Psychology, Intro. to Occupations,
- Art
- Physical Education

Seniors:

- Religion: Morality
- English: English 4
- Social Studies: Government, Economics, Model UN
- Mathematics: Pre-Calculus, Geomoetry, Business Math
- Science: Chemistry, Physics
- Computers: Microsoft Office, Web Page Design
- Health
- Elective Choices: Accounting, Psychology, Intro. to Occupations, Business Law, College Art
- Physical Education

== Interscholastic Sports ==
The school offered the following interscholastic sports:

- Baseball - Varsity
- Basketball - Varsity, Junior Varsity
- Soccer - Varsity
- Softball - Varsity
- Track and Field
- Volleyball - Junior Varsity
- Bowling

== Notable alumni ==
- Larry Hennessy
- Curtis Dennis
- Jarrid Famous
