= Paul De Rolf =

American actor, choreographer and dancer

- Publicity Photo of Paul De Rolf
- Born: December 6, 1942
- Died: June 22, 2017 (aged 74)

Paul De Rolf (December 6, 1942 – June 22, 2017) was an American actor, choreographer, and dancer. In addition to his acting credits, De Rolf choreographed Steven Spielberg's 1941 (1979) and The Karate Kid Part II (1986), as well as the television series Petticoat Junction and The Beverly Hillbillies.

De Rolf began his career as a child actor. In 1955, he appeared opposite Bob Hope as one of the seven brothers in The Seven Little Foys. He was then cast as Eleazar, the nephew of Moses, in Cecil B. DeMille's 1956 epic film, The Ten Commandments. De Rolf transitioned to choreographer in the 1960s. He worked as choreographer and dancer for both television series, The Beverly Hillbillies and Petticoat Junction.

De Rolf was best known for creating the choreography for Steven Spielberg's 1979 period comedic film, 1941. He also choreographed The Karate Kid Part II, starring Ralph Macchio and Pat Morita, which was released in 1986.

Paul De Rolf taught dance at his studio in Los Angeles; his students included actor Tony Danza. He regularly performed with actor and dancer Donald O'Connor, who was best known for Singin' in the Rain (1952).

== Death ==
Paul De Rolf died from Alzheimer's disease in Australia on June 22, 2017, at the age of 74. He was survived by his wife Dorothy, a professional dance instructor, and his daughter, Chantal.

== Filmography ==
Year	Title	Role	Notes
1955	The Seven Little Foys	Richard Foy	
1956	The Ten Commandments	Eleazar	
1957	The Buster Keaton Story	Kid	Uncredited
1957	Jeanne Eagels	Wise Teenager	Uncredited
1965	The Beverly Hillbillies	Horace	
