= Mutiny in the Big House =

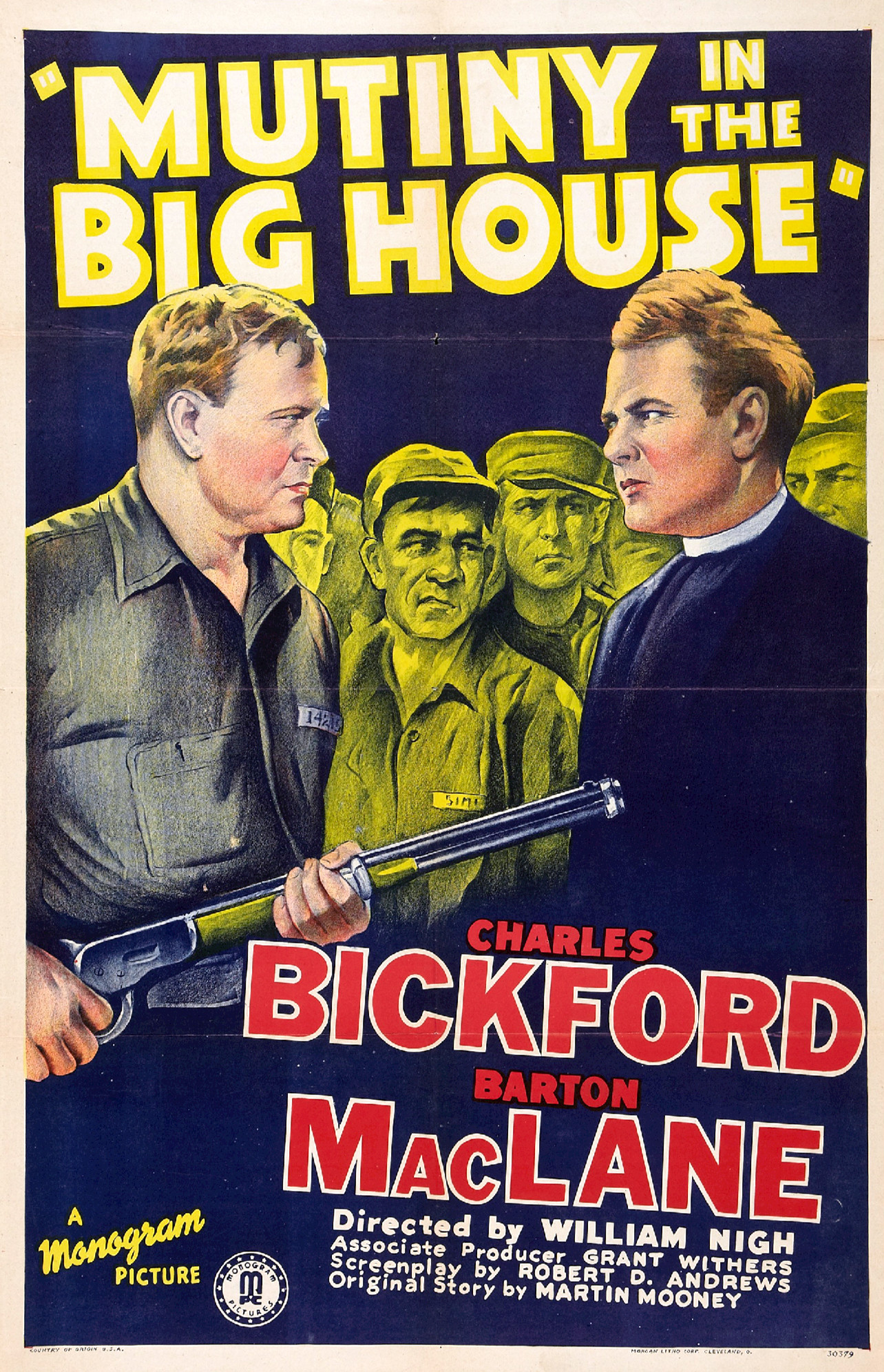
- Film poster
- Directed by: William Nigh
- Written by: Martin Mooney (original story); Robert Hardy Andrews (screenplay)
- Produced by: Grant Withers (associate producer)
- Starring: See below
- Cinematography: Harry Neumann
- Edited by: Russell F. Schoengarth
- Production company: Monogram Pictures
- Release date: 1939
- Running time: 83 minutes
- Country: United States
- Language: English

Mutiny in the Big House is a 1939 American film directed by William Nigh.

== Plot ==
Father Joe Collins is a kindly but realistic prison chaplain who tries to bring some humanity behind the grim walls of a major penitentiary. One of his success stories is "Dad" Schultz, a kindly convict who was released after 20 years but found the outside world so overwhelming that he had a nervous breakdown. Father Collins convinces the prison officials to take him back as a civilian employee/gardener, so he will "feel at home".

Father Collins also takes an interest in Johnny Davis, an educated inmate who received an overly stiff sentence for forging a $10.00 check. Hardened lifer Red Manson does his best to lessen the influence of Father Collins among the inmates, while planning a mass breakout.

When the break begins, Davis wildly fires a rifle to keep Father Collins from being taken hostage. The distraction enables the guards to regain control of the prison.

His actions gain Davis an early release, meanwhile Manson, who killed two guards during the riot, is headed for death row.

== Cast ==
- Charles Bickford as Father Joe Collins
- Barton MacLane as Red Manson
- Pat Moriarity as Pat, the Warden
- Dennis Moore as Johnny Davis
- William Royle as Captain of Guards Ed Samson
- Charley Foy as Convict Bitsy
- George Cleveland as Convict "Dad" Schultz
- Nigel De Brulier as Convict Mike Faleri
- Eddie Foster as Convict Del
- Richard Austin as Singing Jim
- Russell Hopton as Convict Frankie
