= Dance Charlie Dance =

1937 film by Frank McDonald

- Theatrical release poster
- Directed by: Frank McDonald
- Screenplay by: Crane Wilbur; William Jacobs
- Produced by: Bryan Foy
- Starring: Stuart Erwin; Jean Muir; Glenda Farrell; Allen Jenkins
- Cinematography: Warren Lynch
- Edited by: Frank Magee
- Music by: Howard Jackson
- Production company: Warner Bros. Pictures
- Distributed by: Warner Bros. Pictures
- Release date: August 14, 1937
- Running time: 64 minutes
- Country: United States
- Language: English

Dance Charlie Dance is a 1937 American comedy film directed by Frank McDonald and written by Crane Wilbur and William Jacobs, based on the play The Butter and Egg Man by George S. Kaufman. The film stars Stuart Erwin, Jean Muir, Glenda Farrell and Allen Jenkins and features Addison Richards. It was released by Warner Bros. Pictures on August 14, 1937.

The story concerns a stage-struck rural heir who is tricked into financing a bad play, but when the play turns out to be a hit, problems arise when he is sued for plagiarism.

== Plot ==
Andrew Tucker is from a small town and arrives in the big city in hopes of investing in theatrical production, he finds Morgan, a producer with a reputation of producing flops and decides to invest in a bad play, that bad play turns out to be a success as an unintentional comedy.

== Cast ==
- Stuart Erwin as Andrew "Andy" Tucker
- Jean Muir as Mary Mathews
- Glenda Farrell as Fanny Morgan
- Allen Jenkins as Alf Morgan
- Addison Richards as Gordon Fox
- Mary Treen as Jennie Wolfe
- Charley Foy as Phil "Mac" MacArthur
- Chester Clute as Alvin Gussett
- Collette Lyons as Bobbie Benson
