= George M. Cohan Tonight! =

2006 musical by George M. Cohan

- Music: George M. Cohan
- Lyrics: George M. Cohan
- Book: Chip Deffaa
- Basis: The life of George M. Cohan
- Productions: 2006

George M. Cohan Tonight! is a 2006 musical, conceived, written and arranged by Chip Deffaa, with music and lyrics by George M. Cohan, and additional material by Deffaa.

It is a one-man show depicting the life and music of Cohan utilizing his songs, dance routines, memoirs, and the stories of those who knew him. Able to be performed in dozen of venues, George M. Cohan Tonight! opened Off-Broadway in 2006 at the Irish Repertory Theatre in New York City. The original cast album is available from Sh-K-Boom Records/Ghostlight Records.

The New York Times hailed the show as "brash, cocky, and endlessly euphoric" (The New York Times, March 11, 2006). The show originally starred Jon Peterson, was directed by Chip Deffaa, with musical direction by Sterling Price-McKinney. The show earned star Jon Peterson a Drama Desk nomination, and author/director Chip Deffaa an IRNE Award (Independent Reviewers of New England). It is one of six different musicals about Cohan, created for different sized casts and audiences, created by Deffaa.

== Productions ==
Since 2006, George M. Cohan Tonight! has toured the United States appearing in many regional theatre houses. Jon Peterson, Justin Boccitto, and David Herzog have all starred in productions of the show in the US, directed by Deffaa. George M. Cohan Tonight! made an Asian debut in South Korea in 2007. In August 2008, it made its European debut at the Edinburgh Festival Fringe starring David Herzog. Herzog is set to star in the show's British debut, opening September 21, 2010 at the New Players' Theatre on the West End in London.

== Musical Numbers ==
- Hello Broadway/Give My Regards to Broadway
- The Man Who Owns Broadway
- Night Time
- Musical Moon
- Ireland, My Land of Dreams
- I'm Saving Up to Buy a Home for Mother
- Josephine/Oh, You Wonderful Girl
- The Hinkey Dee
- Harrigan
- You Won't Do Any Business If You Haven't Got a Band
- My Father Told Me
- Forty-five Minutes from Broadway
- I'm Awfully Strong For You
- Oh! You Beautiful Girl/I Want the World to Know
- Goodbye Flo
- I Want to Hear a Yankee Doodle Tune
- The Fatal Curse of Drink
- The Yankee Doodle Boy
- Mary's a Grand Old Name
- You're a Grand Old Flag
- Over There
- Drink With Me/Did Ya Ever Have One of Those Days?
- I Love Everyone In the Wide, Wide World/I'm True to Them All
- All-American Sweetheart
- I Won't Be An Actor No More
- Life's a Funny Proposition After All
- All Aboard for Broadway/Give My Regards to Broadway (Reprise)
