= Charley Foy =

American actor

- Born: Charles Richard Fitzgerald; June 12, 1898; New York City, United States
- Died: August 22, 1984 (aged 86); Los Angeles, California, United States
- Occupation: Actor
- Years active: 1915–55
- Spouse: Grace Hayes (1929–34 d.)

Charley Foy (June 12, 1898 – August 22, 1984), born Charles Richard Fitzgerald, was an American actor of both the vaudeville stage and film. Son of Eddie Foy Sr., he was one of the famous "The Seven Little Foys", the seven children of the senior Foy, who joined him on stage in vaudeville. After beginning his career in Vaudeville, he had a film career which spanned 40 years, although he was only truly active for seven of them, from 1936 through 1943.

== Early life ==
Foy's paternal grandparents immigrated to the United States from Ireland in 1855, settling in New York City. As a child, his father, Eddie Foy, and his widowed grandmother, moved to Chicago. After a career that took him around the country, Foy's father settled back in his native New York, where he met and married Madeline Morando. The two had 11 children, seven of whom survived childhood. Of those, Charley was the second oldest. His six surviving siblings were Bryan (1896–1977), Mary (1901–1987), Eddie Jr. (1905–1983), Richard (1905–1947), Madeline (1906–1988), and Irving (1909–2003).

== Career ==
=== The Seven Little Foys ===
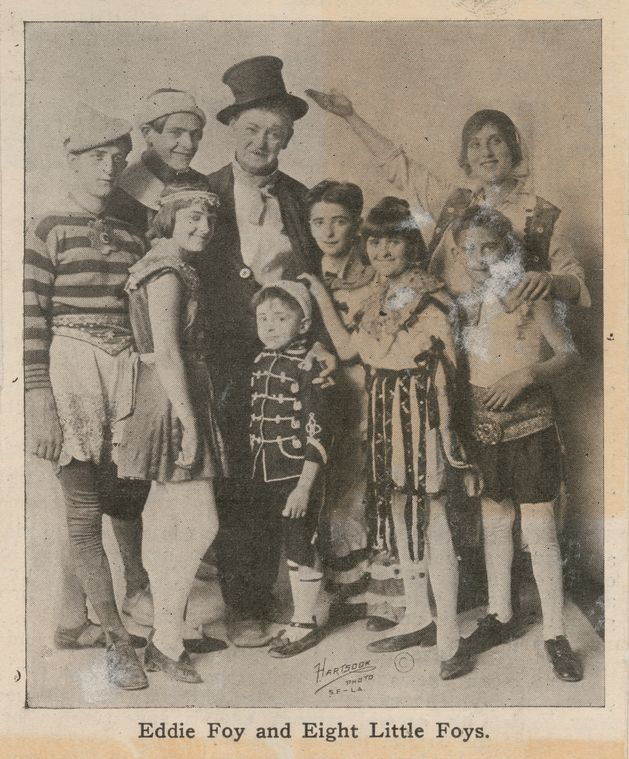
Publicity photograph of Eddie Foy and the Seven Little Foys, 1915 (Charley is on the far left)

As a youth, Foy wanted to be a professional ball player. His entry into show business came when his father created "Eddie and the Seven Little Foys" in 1912, which became one of the most sought-after acts on the Vaudeville stage. The act consisted of skits, songs, and dance, featuring the senior Eddie and his seven children. Occasionally, their mother also appeared with them on-stage until her death in 1918. They debuted at the New Brighton Theater on Long Island, New York on August 19, 1912, before moving to the Union Square Theatre in New York City the following week. Over the next six years, the act appeared in New York theaters and on tours throughout the country. In 1913, after opening in New York at the Union Square, the group toured 13 cities in 17 weeks. Charley Foy made his film debut this year, in a Majestic Motion Picture film short, "The Other Side of the Fence", as a precocious youth who has many adventures. The following year, they worked all 52 weeks. They opened the year on New Year's Day, covering 21 cities before having a three-week stint at the Palace Theatre, followed by a two-week engagement back at the Brighton Theater. They closed the year with another 19-week, 9 city tour.

In 1914 they again set a torrid pace, performing 50 weeks, including two tours of 26 and 19 weeks. They again toured twice in 1915, but this time only for 17 weeks from January through April, and then for the final 6 weeks of the year. In between, Foy appeared in another film in the Mack Sennett short, A Favorite Fool, this time along with the rest of his family. It was another 13 years before the act again appeared on film, minus their father, in the Vitaphone short, "Chips of the Old Block". This short, in the UCLA archive, is the only surviving film of the performances of the family act. They remained busy during 1916–17, going out on four more tours. 1918 saw them once again on road, touring four cities in seven weeks, starting on New Year's Day. After this tour, the oldest son, Bryan, went to serve in the U.S. Army in World War I. The act continued without Bryan, as "Eddie Foy and the Younger Foys", through 1923, when their father retired. The Younger Foys continued on the vaudeville stage through the 1920s, disbanding when Eddie Foy Jr. went out on his own as a single act in 1929.

Foy, along with younger siblings Madeline, Mary, and Irving, continued to perform as an act in Vaudeville through the mid-1930s, billed as "The Foy Family: Real Chips Off the Old Block", in which Charley Foy was given top billing. At one point in the mid-1920s, Foy attempted to give Ginger Rogers, then an unknown dancer by the name of Ginger McMath, an opportunity on stage during a performance in Fort Worth, Texas. However, the venue manager refused to allow her to take the stage.

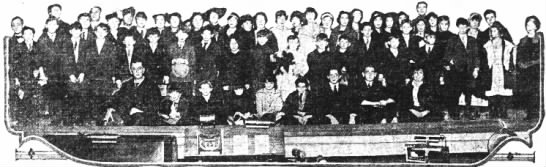
Eddie Foy and the Seven Little Foys at an industry party in Oregon, 1915. The Foys are seated in the front row, from leftː Eddie Foy Sr., Irving, Eddie Jr., Madeline, Mary, Richard, Charley, Bryan

=== Films ===
In 1936, Foy realized that Vaudeville was waning quickly and decided to attempt a return to film, so he left New York and relocated to Hollywood. 21 years after his last foray into film as one of the Seven Little Foys, Charley Foy returned to film in 1936 with the small role of Ratto in the comedy Hot Money From 1936 to 1943, Foy appeared in over 20 pictures, cast either as Charley or Charles Foy. In 1937, he appeared in several films, including Saratoga, which stars Clark Gable and Jean Harlow, in her last screen appearance. Foy had been attempting to utilize his dance expertise since his return to film, with little success. That changed with his being cast as 'Scoop' Trotter in the 1937 musical Melody for Two, for which his dancing received positive notices. He also had a featured role, again utilizing his dance skills, in Dance Charlie Dance, a comedy directed by Frank McDonald. In 1939 he appeared in several notable films. In Lew Landers's espionage drama, Conspiracy, he had one of the starring roles, Studs, which also stars Allan Lane, Linda Hayes, and Robert Barrat. He had a small role in the drama, Hell's Kitchen, which stars the Dead End Kids and Ronald Reagan. Foy also had the featured role of Slick in the Humphrey Bogart gangster film, King of the Underworld, which marked Bogart's first starring role.

Foy had a starring role in the William C. McGann comedy, Sweepstakes Winner, which also stars Marie Wilson, Johnnie Davis, and Allen Jenkins. In 1940, Foy had a small part in the John Garfield crime drama East of the River, which also stars Brenda Marshall and Marjorie Rambeau. Foy again had a featured role in another Bogart film in 1941, the drama The Wagons Roll at Night, which was directed by Ray Enright and also stars Sylvia Sidney and Eddie Albert. Foy's final on-screen performance came in the 1943 western The Woman of the Town, starring Claire Trevor and Albert Dekker and directed by George Archainbaud, in which Foy played his father, Eddie Foy Sr. Foy's final film credit came twelve years later, when he provided the narration for the biopic about his father, The Seven Little Foys in 1955, which stars Bob Hope as the senior Foy.

== Later years and death ==
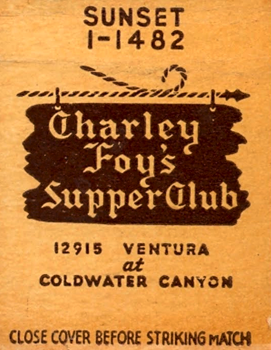
Matchbook cover from Charley Foy's Supper Club, ca. 1942

Foy, along with his younger sister, Mary, operated a supper club during the 1940s and 50s, called the "Charley Foy Supper Club". It was originally located on Ventura Boulevard at Coldwater Canyon in northern Los Angeles, and was one of the first supper clubs in southern California. The club was opened by January 1941, and became a hangout for Hollywood celebrities. It was known for giving opportunities to aspiring young comedians, including Jackie Gleason, Dan Rowan and Dick Martin (who appeared in 1953), Peter Marshall, and Phil Silvers.

During World War II, Foy worked at Hal Roach Studios where he made films for the Army Signal Corps, working with Ronald Reagan. After the war, in addition to running his supper club, he also worked as a talent agent; he also moved his club to Sherman Oaks, California, in the San Fernando Valley. in 1946. He was a long-time friend of fellow vaudevillian and comedian, Joe Frisco, with whom he occasionally appeared with at the supper club. The club featured old vaudeville performers as waiters, such as Cully Richards and Sammy Wolfe. The club also featured former vaudevillian Frankie Hyers behind the bar. Hyers is credited by some as creating the expression "And away we go!", which would become popularized later by Jackie Gleason.

Born Charles Richard Fitzgerald, he legally changed his name to his stage name, Charley Foy, in 1956. He was admitted to Cedars-Sinai Medical Center in Los Angeles on August 18, 1984, suffering from a toxic blood disease, sepsis. Foy died four days later, on August 22.

== Filmography ==
(List of feature films per AFI database, or else by a citation included in the article)

- Polo Joe (1936) as Second Loafer
- Hot Money (1936) as Ratto
- Here Comes Carter (1936) as Louie Cramer
- Down the Stretch (1936) as Arnold Roach
- Fugitive in the Sky (1936) as Steve Fanning
- Saratoga (1937)
- Dance Charlie Dance (1937) as Phil 'Mac' MacArthur
- Wine, Women and Horses (1937) as Broadway Willis
- Torchy Blane, the Adventurous Blonde (1937) as Dud
- Melody for Two (1937) as 'Scoop' Trotter
- Midnight Court (1937) as Dutch
- Daredevil Drivers (1938) as 'Stub' Wilson
- Penrod and His Twin Brother (1938) as Kraemer
- Midnight Intruder (1938) as Taxi Driver (uncredited)
- Conspiracy (1939)
- King of the Underworld (1939) as Slick
- Sweepstakes Winner (1939) as 'Jinx' Donovan
- Mutiny in the Big House (1939) as Convict Bitsy
- Blackwell's Island (1939) as Benny Farmer
- Hell's Kitchen (1939) as Floogie
- East of the River (1940) as Customer
- The Wagons Roll at Night (1941) as Snapper
- The Woman of the Town (1943) as Eddie Foy Sr.
- The Seven Little Foys (1955) as Narrator (voice)
