= Jarrid Famous =

American basketball player (born 1988)

Personal information
- Born: July 16, 1988 (age 38) Bronx, New York, U.S.
- Listed height: 6 ft 11 in (2.11 m)
- Listed weight: 240 lb (109 kg)

Career information
- High school: Blessed Sacrament-St. Gabriel (New Rochelle, New York)
- College: Westchester CC (2007–2009); South Florida (2009–2011)
- NBA draft: 2011: undrafted
- Playing career: 2011–2023
- Position: Power forward / center

Career history
- 2011: SKP Banska Bystrica
- 2011–2012: Iowa Energy
- 2012: Fort Wayne Mad Ants
- 2012: Meralco Bolts
- 2012: Petron Blaze Boosters
- 2012: Sichuan Blue Whales
- 2012: Metros de Santiago
- 2012–2013: Los Angeles D-Fenders
- 2013: Iowa Energy
- 2013: Leñeros de Los Mina
- 2013–2014: Tadamon Zouk
- 2014–2015: Iowa Energy
- 2015: Texas Legends
- 2015: GlobalPort Batang Pier
- 2015: Fujian Sturgeons
- 2015–2016: Hekmeh
- 2016: Al-Muharraq
- 2016: Bucaneros de La Guaira
- 2016: Maccabi Haifa
- 2017: Al Naser Dubai
- 2017: Caciques de Humacao
- 2017: Gallitos de Isabela
- 2017–2018: Gimnasia y Esgrima de Comodoro Rivadavia
- 2018: Blackwater Elite
- 2018–2019: Leñadores de Durango
- 2019: Trotamundos B.B.C.
- 2019: Cariduros de Fajardo
- 2019: Astros de Jalisco
- 2020–2021: Club Atlético Peñarol
- 2022: Club Sportivo Capitol
- 2023: NSH Mountain Gold Timika
- Stats at Basketball Reference

Jarrid Jerome Famous (born July 16, 1988) is an American former professional basketball player. He played college basketball at both Westchester Community College and the University of South Florida.

== High school and college career ==
After graduating from Blessed Sacrament-St. Gabriel High School, Famous went to Westchester Community College where he averaged 25.2 points, 13.6 rebounds and 2.1 blocks per game as a sophomore, being named one of 10 players named to the NJCAA Division I All-American first-team for the 2008–2009 season. After his sophomore season, he transferred to South Florida, where he played in 31 games and started 20, averaging 8.7 points, 5.4 rebounds, 0.4 assists and 0.5 blocks per night.

== Professional career ==
Famous went undrafted in the 2011 NBA draft. In October 2011, he signed with SKP Banska Bystrica of Slovakia. However, he left after just 2 games. On November 3, 2011, he was selected in the third round of the 2011 NBA D-League draft by the Iowa Energy. On December 9, 2011, he signed with the Indiana Pacers. However, he was waived on December 23. On December 26, he was reacquired by the Iowa Energy. On January 5, 2012, he was traded to the Fort Wayne Mad Ants. On January 27, 2012, his contract was bought out by the Mad Ants. In February 2012, he joined the Meralco Bolts of the Philippines for the Commissioner's Cup. He later joined the Petron Blaze Boosters.

In July 2012, he joined the Indiana Pacers for the Orlando Summer League and the Milwaukee Bucks for the Las Vegas Summer League. Following the Summer League, he joined Metros de Santiago of the Dominican Republic. On September 27, 2012, he signed with the Memphis Grizzlies. However, he was waived on October 7. In November 2012, he was acquired by the Los Angeles D-Fenders. On January 30, 2013, he was traded to the Iowa Energy. In May 2013, he signed with Leñeros de Los Mina of the Dominican Republic. Later that year, he signed with Tadamon Zouk of Lebanon for the 2013–14 season.

In July 2014, he joined the Memphis Grizzlies for the 2014 NBA Summer League. In September 2014, he signed with Jiangsu Dragons of China. However, he was later released by Jiangsu on October 31, 2014, before appearing in a game for them.

On December 12, 2014, he was reacquired by the Iowa Energy. On February 24, 2015, he was traded to the Texas Legends in exchange for a 2015 third-round draft pick.

In May 2015, he returned to the Philippines, this time with GlobalPort Batang Pier. In nine games for GlobalPort, he averaged 30.2 points and 23.0 rebounds per game.

In July 2015, he joined the Washington Wizards for the 2015 NBA Summer League. On July 24, he signed with the Dallas Mavericks. However, he was later waived by the Mavericks on October 22 after appearing in five preseason games. Five days later, he signed with the Fujian Sturgeons of the Chinese Basketball Association, making his debut on November 6. On December 24, he left Fujian to play for Hekmeh of the Lebanese League, playing in seven games with the team. On February 5, he left Hekmeh and signed with Al-Muharraq of the Bahraini League. On March 2, he moved to Bucaneros de La Guaira of the Venezuelan League.

On October 5, 2016, Famous signed with Maccabi Haifa of the Israeli League. On December 14, 2016, he parted ways with Haifa after appearing in six games. On January 2, 2017, he signed with Al Naser Dubai of the UAE National Basketball League.

In February 2017, he was supposed to sign with the Phoenix Fuel Masters as their import for the 2017 PBA Commissioner's Cup. However, his former PBA team, GlobalPort, refused to let go of their rights on him, pushing the Fuel Masters to choose for another import.

On March 7, 2017, Famous signed with the Caciques de Humacao of the Baloncesto Superior Nacional.

On August 3, 2017, Famous signed with Gimnasia y Esgrima de Comodoro Rivadavia of the Liga Nacional de Básquet.

In March 2018, Famous signed with the Blackwater Elite of the Philippine Basketball Association as their import for the 2018 PBA Commissioner's Cup.

On January 22, 2022, Famous signed with Club Sportivo Capitol of the Liga Uruguaya de Basketball.

On October 11, 2022, Famous entered the 2022 IBL Foreign Draft, he was picked in the second round 19th overall by the NSH Mountain Gold Timika.

== International career ==
In August 2012, Famous competed for the Lebanese national basketball team in the 2012 William Jones Cup after he was naturalised earlier that year.
