= The Seven Little Foys =

1955 film by Melville Shavelson

- Film poster
- Directed by: Melville Shavelson
- Written by: Jack Rose; Melville Shavelson
- Produced by: Jack Rose
- Starring: Bob Hope; Milly Vitale; George Tobias
- Narrated by: Charley Foy
- Cinematography: John F. Warren
- Edited by: Ellsworth Hoagland
- Music by: Joseph J. Lilley
- Production companies: Hope Enterprises; Scribe Productions
- Distributed by: Paramount Pictures
- Release dates: June 1, 1955 (Sydney, Australia); June 23, 1955 (Los Angeles); June 29, 1955 (New York City)
- Running time: 93 minutes
- Country: United States
- Language: English
- Budget: $1.5 million
- Box office: $4 million (US)

The Seven Little Foys is a Technicolor in VistaVision 1955 biographical musical comedy-drama film directed by Melville Shavelson starring Bob Hope as Eddie Foy. The story of Eddie Foy Sr. and the Seven Little Foys inspired a TV version in 1964 and a stage musical version, which premiered in 2007.

James Cagney plays George M. Cohan, recreating the role he played in Yankee Doodle Dandy. His dance duet with Hope as Foy is considered one of the film's best scenes.

== Plot ==
Vaudeville entertainer Eddie Foy, who has vowed to forever keep his act a solo, falls in love with and marries Italian ballerina Madeleine. While they continue to tour the circuit, they begin a family and before long have seven children. After the tragedy of the Iroquois Theater Fire in 1903, Foy was credited with calming the crowd and keeping the death count manageable. Madeline's mother is a continual critic of her daughter's marriage to Eddie, as he is always "on the road" and leaving all the hard work to her. Eddie does grant his wife's fondest wish and buys a large country house in New Rochelle to hold his huge family.

But Madeline dies while Eddie is away and Eddie suddenly finds himself a bewildered single parent. The only way he can avoid being "an absent father" is to work his children into the act and take them with him. Initially rebelling, the children eventually come to like show business.

== Cast ==
- Bob Hope as Eddie Foy
- Milly Vitale as Madeleine Morando Foy
- George Tobias as Barney Green
- Angela Clarke as Clara Morando
- Herbert Heyes as Judge
- Richard Shannon as Stage Manager
- Billy Gray as Bryan Lincoln Foy
- Lee Erickson as Charley Foy
- Paul De Rolf as Richard Foy
- Lydia Reed as Mary Foy
- Linda Bennett as Madeleine Foy
- Jimmy Baird as Eddie Foy Jr.
- Tommy Duran as Irving Foy
- Jimmy Conlin as Stage Mgr
- James Cagney as George M. Cohan
- Marian Carr as Chorine
- Charley Foy as Narrator
- Jerry Mathers as Bryan Lincoln Foy (uncredited)

NOTE: Mathers played Bryan Lincoln Foy as a 7-year old (Iroquois Theater Fire scene); Gray played the older Bryan Lincoln Foy in the rest of the movie.

== Reception ==
- The writers Melville Shavelson and Jack Rose were nominated for an Academy Award for Best Story and Screenplay at the 28th Academy Awards, held on March 21, 1956.
- This was Bob Hope's first role combining straight drama with comedy, and his acting was well received.

== Other versions ==
- Bob Hope hosted an hour-long TV version of The Seven Little Foys on January 24, 1964, as part of the NBC series Bob Hope Presents the Chrysler Theatre. The television version featured Eddie Foy Jr. playing his father, Mickey Rooney as George Cohan, and The Osmonds as Mr. Foy's children.
- In 2007, the first stage musical version of The Seven Little Foys, written by Chip Deffaa (featuring songs made famous by the Foys, as well as originals by Deffaa), had its world premiere at Seven Angels Theater in Waterbury, Connecticut.

== See also ==
- List of American films of 1955
