= Eddie Foy III =

American casting director and actor

- Publicity Photo of Eddie Foy III
- Born: February 10, 1935; New York City, New York, U.S.
- Died: November 3, 2018 (aged 83); Denison, Iowa, U.S.
- Other names: Eddie Foy
- Occupation(s): Casting director Actor
- Years active: 1955–1998
- Spouse: Jan Standley (m. 1995; died 2018)
- Parent(s): Eddie Foy Jr. Anna Marie McKenney
- Relatives: Eddie Foy Sr. (grandfather); Bryan Foy (uncle)

Eddie Foy III (February 10, 1935 – November 3, 2018) was an American casting director and actor. He was director of casting for ABC and vice president of casting for NBC.

Foy completed his career as a longstanding independent casting director and talent executive for The Jerry Lewis MDA Labor Day Telethon. For his contributions to the advancement of television casting, he was honored by the Academy of Television Arts & Sciences.

== Early years ==
Born in New York City, Foy was the son of Eddie Foy Jr. and Anna Marie McKenny Foy. He was the grandson of Eddie Foy Sr. He attended Riverdale Country School.

Foy debuted on stage at age 10 in a revival of The Red Mill on Broadway.

Eddie Foy was an officer in the California Army National Guard. He was commissioned a Second Lt on 21 July 1962 at Camp San Luis Obispo after completing the one year Officer Candidate School. He was assigned to Company A, 240th Signal Battalion.

== Career ==
After a brief foray into acting, Foy became a casting director and over a 42-year period was involved in casting some of the most popular television shows of the era, including The Donna Reed Show, Naked City, Dennis the Menace, Route 66, Straightaway, The Farmer's Daughter, Gidget, I Dream of Jeannie, The Monkees, The Flying Nun, That Girl, Julia, Room 222, Happy Days, Soap, Hill Street Blues, Charlie's Angels, Mork & Mindy, and Barney Miller, as well as TV movies and miniseries such as Roots and Shōgun, and feature films, including Planet of the Apes and The Great White Hope.

== Personal life ==
On September 16, 1995, Foy married Jan Standley in Sherman Oaks, California.

Foy died on November 3, 2018, after a fall at his home in Denison, Iowa.

== Filmography ==
Year	Title	Role	Notes
1955	Women's Prison	Warden's Trustee	Uncredited
1956	Battle Stations	Tom Short	
1957	Outlaw's Son	Tod Wentworth	
1958	Run Silent, Run Deep	Larto	
1958	When Hell Broke Loose	Brooklyn	
