= Seth Sikes =

American singer

Seth Sikes (born January 30, 1984) is an American cabaret singer based in New York City.

== Early life ==
Born in Paris, Texas, the son of educators Bill and Candi Sikes, much of his youth was spent acting, playing trumpet and dreaming of Broadway.

== New York and 54 Below ==
After graduating from North Lamar High School, Sikes moved to New York City and attended Circle in the Square Theater School. He was later employed on Broadway as Assistant Director for The Nance, by Douglas Carter Beane, starring Nathan Lane, at the Lyceum Theatre (Broadway), and Associate Director for The Band's Visit (musical), by David Yazbek and Itamar Moses, at the Ethel Barrymore Theatre.

In June, 2015, Sikes made his cabaret debut at 54 Below, appearing before "a sold-out house," according to columnist Rex Reed. Specializing in show tunes, Sikes performs songs associated with Judy Garland, Liza Minnelli, Bernadette Peters and Barbra Streisand.
