= Eddie Foy Jr. =

American actor (1905–1983)

- Foy Jr. in Fair Exchange, 1963
- Born: Edwin Fitzgerald Jr. February 4, 1905; New Rochelle, New York U.S.
- Died: July 15, 1983 (aged 78); Los Angeles, California U.S.
- Occupation: Actor
- Years active: 1915–1977
- Spouses: Barbara Newberry (m. 1930; div. 1932) Anna Marie McKenney (m. 1933; died 1952)
- Children: Eddie Foy III
- Parent: Eddie Foy

Edwin Fitzgerald Jr. (February 4, 1905 – July 15, 1983), known professionally as Eddie Foy Jr., was an American stage, film and television actor. His career spanned six decades, beginning as part of the vaudeville act Eddie Foy and the Seven Little Foys. The other members of the group included his father Eddie Foy and his siblings.

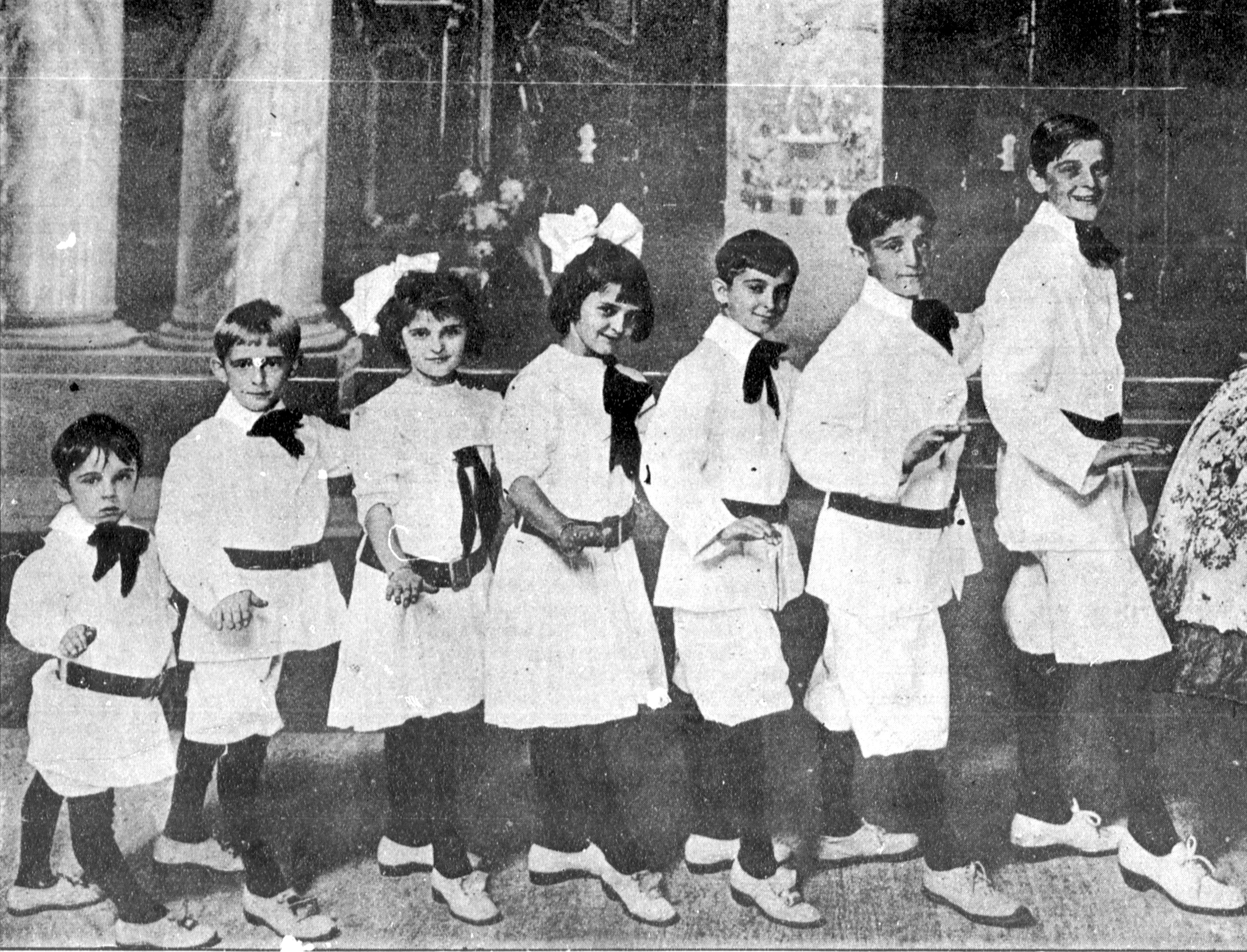
Eddie Foy Jr. performing as part of The Seven Little Foys in 1916

== Career ==
Foy made his Broadway debut in Florenz Ziegfeld's 1929 extravaganza Show Girl alongside Ruby Keeler and Jimmy Durante. He also appeared in At Home Abroad, The Cat and the Fiddle, The Red Mill, The Pajama Game, Donnybrook! and Rumple (1957), for which he received a Tony Award nomination as Best Actor in a Musical.

Eddie Foy Jr. (wearing false teeth) in a 1928 Vitaphone Varieties piece with family

Throughout the 1930s and 1940s, Foy appeared in many B movies. He closely resembled his father and portrayed him in four feature films: Frontier Marshal (1939), Lillian Russell (1940), Yankee Doodle Dandy (1942) and Wilson (1944). He also portrayed his father in a 1964 telefilm about the family's early days in vaudeville. Among Foy's other film credits are those for The Farmer Takes a Wife, The Pajama Game, Bells Are Ringing and Gidget Goes Hawaiian.

Foy found steady work with the advent of television. In addition to starring in the first hour-long sitcom, Fair Exchange, he made numerous guest appearances on programs such as The Gisele MacKenzie Show, Alfred Hitchcock Presents, Glynis, My Living Doll, Burke's Law, ABC Stage 67, My Three Sons and Nanny and the Professor.

== Personal life ==
Foy was married to Anna Marie McKenney from 1933 until her death in 1952. They had a son, Eddie Foy III,

== Death ==
Foy died of pancreatic cancer in Los Angeles on July 15, 1983, at age 78.

== Filmography ==
- The Swell Head (1928)
- Queen of the Night Clubs (1929) – Eddie Parr
- Leathernecking (1930) – Chick Evans
- Nearly Naked (1933) – Eddie
- Broadway Thru a Keyhole (1933) – Joan's partner
- Myrt and Marge (1933) – Eddie Hanley
- Moulin Rouge (1934) – Magician (uncredited)
- Wonder Bar (1934) – Chorus Boy / Angel Measuring Wings (uncredited)
- King of Burlesque (1936) – Dancer (uncredited)
- Star for a Night (1936) – Dancer (uncredited)
- College Holiday (1936) – Dancer (uncredited)
- Turn Off the Moon (1937) – Dancer
- Secret Service of the Air (1939) – Gabby Watters (#1 'Secret Service series')
- Women in the Wind (1939) – Denny Corson
- Code of the Secret Service (1939) – Gabby (#2 'Secret Service series')
- Frontier Marshal (1939) – Eddie Foy
- The Cowboy Quarterback (1939) – Steve Adams
- Smashing the Money Ring (1939) – Gabby (#3 'Secret Service series')
- Lillian Russell (1940) – Eddie Foy Sr.
- Murder in the Air (1940) – Gabby Watters (#4 'Secret Service series', final)
- A Fugitive from Justice (1940) – Ziggy
- Scatterbrain (1940) – Eddie MacIntyre
- The Texas Rangers Ride Again (1941) – Mandolin
- The Case of the Black Parrot (1941) – Tripod Daniels
- Rookies on Parade (1941) – Cliff Dugan
- Country Fair (1941) – Johnny Campbell
- Puddin' Head (1941) – Harold L. Montgomery Jr.
- Four Jacks and a Jill (1942) – Happy McScud
- Yokel Boy (1942) – Joe Ruddy
- Yankee Doodle Dandy (1942) – Eddie Foy
- Powder Town (1942) – Mr. Billy Meeker
- Moonlight Masquerade (1942) – Lord Percy Ticklederry
- Joan of Ozark (1942) – Eddie McCabe
- Dixie Dugan (1943) – Matt Hogan
- Dixie (1943) – Mr. Felham
- And the Angels Sing (1944) – Fuzzy Johnson
- Wilson (1944) – Eddie Foy
- Honeychile (1951) – Eddie Price
- The Farmer Takes a Wife (1953) – Fortune Friendly
- Lucky Me (1954) – Duke McGee
- The Pajama Game (1957) – Vernon Hines
- Alfred Hitchcock Presents (1959) (Season 4 Episode 22: "The Right Price") – "The Cat"
- Bells Are Ringing (1960) – J. Otto Prantz
- Gidget Goes Hawaiian (1961) – Monty Stewart
- Gidget Goes to Rome (1963) – Beachgoer Wanting to Use Phone (uncredited)
- 30 Is a Dangerous Age, Cynthia (1968) – Oscar
- Won Ton Ton, the Dog Who Saved Hollywood (1976) – Custard Pie Star
