= Bet Tzedek =

American nonprofit legal organization

- Founded: 1974; 52 years ago, Los Angeles, CA, United States
- Type: NGO non-profit organization
- Purpose: Civil rights humanitarian aid
- Headquarters: Los Angeles County
- Website: www.bettzedek.org

Bet Tzedek Legal Services is an American nonprofit social justice and economic rights organization based in Los Angeles, California. The organization provides pro bono legal and social support services and conducts policy advocacy and impact litigation.

== History ==
=== 1970s and 1980s ===
==== Origin ====
Bet Tzedek was founded in 1974 by a group of Jewish attorneys, law students and community members concerned about gentrification and housing issues living in the Beverly Fairfax neighborhood of Los Angeles. The group's volunteer attorneys provided free legal representation to low-income residents of Los Angeles. Through the mid-1970s, Bet Tzedek grew from a volunteer-run organization into a full-service center providing free legal aid to all low-income residents of Los Angeles County.

In its early years, most of Bet Tzedek's services were provided to low-income Holocaust survivors and other vulnerable seniors in need of assistance writing wills, obtaining unemployment benefits or dealing with landlord/tenant disputes. By the 1980s, their services had expanded enough prompting a move into a larger office, where they began to focus on other legal matters, although they still worked on unlawful eviction cases. About half of Bet Tzedek's cases in 1980 were landlord-tenant disputes. Many of their clients during this period remained elderly and/or immigrant residents in the Fairfax district.

==== Holocaust reparations ====
In 1984, Bet Tzedek achieved a significant legal victory that provided support to thousands of low-income, elderly Holocaust survivors. The U.S. Court of Appeals for the 9th Circuit ruled in favor of Felicia Grunfeder, a Bet Tzedek client and Holocaust survivor who had been denied disability benefits because she received a small Holocaust reparations payment.

In 1987, after a four-year legal battle, Bet Tzedek negotiated a settlement that allowed elderly residents of an old hotel to remain in their accommodation. This agreement preserved their current low rent and shielded them from further eviction threats.

=== 1990s ===
In the early 1990s, Bet Tzedek filed a lawsuit against a national HMO, alleging fraud and deceptive sales practices, through known racially targeted victimization of elderly Spanish-speaking enrollees. Ensuing media coverage prompted a federal investigation and a stockholder suit against the company and Bet Tzedek successfully settled the underlying case.

Bet Tzedek provided legal aid to affected businesses during and following the 1992 Los Angeles riots, which erupted after the acquittal of four LAPD officers involved in the beating of Rodney King, a black motorist. The organization initiated a program to support businesses affected by the riots.

==== Elder abuse and fraud protection ====
In 1995, Bet Tzedek investigated conditions at Los Angeles-area nursing homes and found evidence of violations that posed risks to patients.

In 1997, three members of Bet Tzedek's staff and Board contributed to the Mayor's Blue Ribbon Committee on Slum Housing, whose suggestions were adopted by the L.A. City Council as the most thorough code program ever implemented locally.

In 1998, Bet Tzedek brought a major class-action suit with pro bono counsel against 16 European-based insurance companies who refused to honor insurance policies purchased by Jews who perished in the Holocaust.

In 1999, Bet Tzedek represented over 100 tenants residing in an abandoned downtown building, utilizing local statutes to clear titles and eliminate millions of dollars in liens. This legal action paves the way for a new owner to acquire and renovate the building.

In 1999, Bet Tzedek's lawsuit against Hillhaven, one of the largest nursing home chains in the country, contributed to changes in business practices regarding violations of state and federal law which caused financial hardships for residents and their families.

=== 2000s ===
==== Sydney M. Irmas Housing Conditions Project ====
Bet Tzedek's Sydney M. Irmas Housing Conditions Project, funded by the Irmas Family Foundation aimed to help low-income families secure safe, affordable housing. In 2001, the Irmas Project filed a lawsuit on behalf of tenants' rights group Inquilinos Unidos against a well-known landlord in Los Angeles. The lawsuit was later joined by the Los Angeles City Attorney's office, and the law firm of Gibson, Dunn & Crutcher served as pro bono counsel on the suit. The lawsuit resulted in a legal ruling against landlords who subject their tenants to substandard health and safety conditions. This case helped clarify the legal ability of tenants' groups to pursue claims against landlords using multiple business entities.

==== Kinship Care Project ====
Bet Tzedek founded the Kinship Care Project in 2002, aimed at aiding relative caregivers who serve as custodians, legal guardians, or adoptive parents to minors. The organization assists in accessing healthcare and education while also facilitating the formalization of custodial relationships. Renamed the Kinship Care Program in 2014, Bet Tzedek continues to provide resources to educate lawmakers about the need for uniform application of probate laws, particularly as they relate to unaccompanied minors. The program contributed to the passage of SB 873 in 2014, which preserved the rights of immigrant minors in guardianship proceedings.

Concurrently, in the same year, Bet Tzedek, with pro bono counsel, successfully represented Irene Gut Opdyke's estate in an eight-week trial regarding the rights to her life story, "righteous gentile" who saved numerous Jews during World War II.

In 2002, Bet Tzedek investigated the city's most-convicted slumlord, discovering multiple fraudulent practices. Bet Tzedek's lawsuit resulted in a $1 million settlement, with funds directed to the City of Los Angeles.

In 2003, Bet Tzedek engaged in international litigation for the first time by representing victims of Nazi persecution within the German court system, advocating for Holocaust survivors appealing denials of restitution payments. Concurrently, in California, State Treasurer Phil Angelides collaborates with Bet Tzedek to persuade U.S. banks to waive wire transfer fees for payments to indigent survivors.

In 2004, Bet Tzedek contributed to the passage of a state law focused on protecting the rights of garment workers, ensuring the safety and proper treatment of hundreds of thousands of workers in L.A. alone. And under Assembly Bill 633, Bet Tzedek assisted employees of a major clothing retailer with receiving compensation from a retailer for labor violations committed by a manufacturer later that year.

==== Eviction defense for tenants ====
Bet Tzedek participated in efforts with the city of Los Angeles to oppose the "Landlord's Solution," which sought to permit landlords to evict tenants who refused intrusive requests for information aimed at disrupting their tenancy. The Los Angeles Superior Court concurred and upheld a law that prohibited such practices.

=== 2010s ===
In 2012, Bet Tzedek moved from its longtime headquarters in Los Angeles' historically Jewish Fairfax District to a new headquarters on Wilshire Boulevard in Koreatown. The move was partly due to the changing demographics of the people served by Bet Tzedek, with the organization seeking a more accessible location for its services.

==== Foreclosure prevention ====
In 2014, Bet Tzedek's Board of Directors appointed Jessie Kornberg President & CEO, the first woman to hold the position in the agency's history.

Through its Kinship Care Program, Bet Tzedek educates lawmakers about the need for uniform application of probate laws, particularly as they relate to unaccompanied minors. This led to the passage of SB 873 and a favorable ruling in the appellate court which preserved the right for immigrant minors to be treated equitably in guardianship proceedings.

Bet Tzedek testified before Congress in 2014 regarding the impact of reparations payments on the eligibility of elderly Holocaust survivors for public benefits. Bet Tzedek's advocacy led to a rewrite of the Social Security Administration's procedural manual, ensuring clearer guidance for eligibility workers and safeguarding benefits for survivors.

==== Justice for children and families ====
Bet Tzedek has long provided services focused on the care of children and families, regardless of immigration status. With its Kinship Care Program, Bet Tzedek co-sponsored AB 900 which passed in court, to support children maintaining stable legal guardianship. Teodora Manolova, a Bet Tzedek volunteer, was awarded the President's Pro Bono Service Award by the State Bar of California in 2016. Manolova worked with Bet Tzedek's Rapid Response program assisting unaccompanied minors seeking Special Immigrant Juvenile Status, a status that allows them to remain in the U.S.

In 2017, Bet Tzedek received a Distinguished Service Award from the Judicial Council of California in recognition of its 40 years of free legal services, including its work with the Family Preparedness Project. Launched in February 2017, the Family Preparedness Project was created to assist undocumented parents facing threats of deportation.

In February 2017, Bet Tzedek co-sponsored Assembly Bill 900 (AB 900), ensuring human trafficking survivors are no longer denied access to life-saving resources through the California's Victim's Compensation Fund.

Bet Tzedek represented senior citizens, many aged 90 and older and some Holocaust survivors, in a legal dispute with Watermark Retirement Communities, the new owner of the Westwood Horizons building. Bet Tzedek intervened in June 2017 and helped secure permanent protections for the building, making it a rent-controlled residential hotel, where residents could not be evicted without just cause. In the late summer of 2017, Bet Tzedek was publicly acknowledged for their leadership in combating elder abuse by the Los Angeles County Board of Supervisors.

In 2018, Bet Tzedek, in collaboration with the L.A. City Attorney's office and other local organizations, secured over $1M in restitution for approximately 60 car wash employees in a wage theft case. The award is considered one of the largest restitution payments to car wash workers in Los Angeles. Bet Tzedek's Employment Rights Program has helped secure nearly $40M in judgments and settlements for workers since its inception in 2001.

==== Property Assessed Clean Energy (PACE) ====
Bet Tzedek, with Irell & Manella LLP and Public Counsel, filed twin class actions lawsuits on behalf of L.A. County homeowners, alleging issues with the financial practices of two companies with which the county operates the Property Assessed Clean Energy (PACE) program, which finances "green" home improvements. Though the PACE program was intended to serve a public good — funding energy-efficient home improvements that should save consumers money and reduce the collective environmental footprint. However, the implementation of the program had raised concerns, with some homeowners reporting financial difficulties, drawing comparisons to the subprime lending crisis.

On April 13, 2018, the Los Angeles LGBT Bar Association awarded Bet Tzedek with their Community Service Award for its work promoting trans equality. Since its inception in 2016, Bet Tzedek's Transgender Advocacy Project has helped 994 individuals and trained over 60 volunteer attorneys and advocates.

In June 2019, Governor Newsom signed a budget that includes millions of dollars to eliminate the years-long waitlist for victims of wage theft seeking compensation. The Garment Worker Center, Bet Tzedek, and the UCLA Labor Center made the budget request on behalf of garment workers, with assistance from the Western Center on Law & Poverty.

In partnership with the California Low Income Consumer Coalition, Bet Tzedek successfully advocated for the passage of SB 616. Signed into law on October 8, 2019, SB 616 exempts $1,724 from the levy, ensuring that low-income Californians, in particular, will still be able to meet minimum living expenses if a debt collector levies their bank account. This change brings California into line with 16 other states with similar exemptions. The exemption does not erase the debt, but it does prevent a debt levy from creating a situation where a person cannot access some reserve funds to pay for rent, medication, transportation, or other urgent expenses and therefore falls further into debt, joblessness, and even homelessness.

In October 2019, Assembly Bill AB 629 was signed into law by Governor Gavin Newsom. The bill aimed to create parity within California's Victim Compensation Program (VCP), allowing victims of human trafficking to receive compensation for economic losses related to their trafficking. This victory represents over three years of advocacy work on the part of Bet Tzedek and their partner CAST.

=== 2020s ===
In January 2020, a Los Angeles Superior Court judge ruled that the Department of Health Care Services must notify eligible beneficiaries of a spousal impoverishment protection originally instituted in the Affordable Care Act, which set a deadline to expand spousal impoverishment protections to home-based care starting January 1, 2014. However, the DHCS did not issue guidance until July 2017 following a lawsuit filed by two plaintiffs with assistance from Bet Tzedek. Bet Tzedek’s involvement led to a ruling that required DHCS to notify beneficiaries who could benefit from the rule and establish a process to determine eligibility for IHSS retroactively.

A group of restaurant workers from Genwa Korean BBQ first sought help from Bet Tzedek and Koreatown Immigrant Workers Alliance (KIWA) in 2018 for unfair treatment and wage theft. Bet Tzedek’s attorneys filed a complaint to the Bureau of Field Enforcement (BOFE) and, in March 2020, the California Labor Commissioner’s Office issued a $2.1 million fine to the owners after determining they had failed to pay wages to 325 employees. A payroll audit determined that full-time staff at both restaurants were deprived of wages by being forced to go off the clock for one hour up to three times a day during their 11-hour workday. None of the workers were provided proper rest or meal breaks as required by law. Nearly half were paid less than the required minimum hourly wage, while more than half were shorted on overtime pay, nor did they provide proper itemized wage statements. Servers were also unlawfully required to attend quarterly staff meetings without pay, even on their scheduled days off. This case resulted in a significant outcome for low-paid workers in Los Angeles.

==== COVID-19 ====
In May 2020, the City of Los Angeles asked Bet Tzedek to join LA Represents, an unprecedented legal assistance initiative to help thousands of Angelenos who were facing extreme hardships due to the pandemic. Bet Tzedek helped small businesses affected by the COVID-19 crisis, providing access to pro bono legal assistance as entrepreneurs navigated new regulations, renegotiated leases, applied for relief programs, and complied with health and safety orders. Through this partnership with the City and other government and community organizations, Bet Tzedek provided a broad range of services to small business owners like webinars, workshops, and direct assistance.

In July, a long-time client of the organization died from COVID-19. Since 2017, Bet Tzedek’s legal team has been involved in a lawsuit related to the Los Angeles County Property Assessed Clean Energy (PACE) program. The case raised concerns about consumer protection and led to the eventual termination of the program, which was intended to assist with energy-efficient home improvements but faced legal challenges related to consumer fraud. After two years of legal proceedings, the client was awarded a refund of $12,000. The client passed away before receiving the refund, and a portion of it was used for funeral expenses. The organization continues to advocate for the client’s family to receive a corrected tax bill.

=== 2021 ===
In addition to empowering the senior community, Bet Tzedek has attended to the needs of caregivers through advocacy. The organization’s efforts have helped recover $8.5 million in stolen wages for caregivers in senior centers.

Through its Employment Rights Project, Bet Tzedek advocated for the passing of the Garment Worker Protection Act (SB 62). SB 62 passed on September 27, 2021, when Governor Gavin Newsom signed the act into law, which took effect January 2022. SB 62 makes California the first state to require hourly wages for garment workers, eliminates the piece-rate pay structure (which had previously paid workers as little as 2¢-6¢ per piece), and ensures that retailers and brands cannot use layers of contracting to avoid wage theft liability.

On October 5, 2021, Governor Gavin Newsom signed AB 1020: Health Care Debt and Fair Billing into law, a policy initiative developed in response to the experiences of Bet Tzedek’s Harbor-UCLA MLP clients. AB 1020 raises the income threshold for charity care, making more Californians eligible for relief; requires hospitals to prominently display the hospital’s policy for qualified patients; strengthens state agencies’ abilities to enforce existing laws; and limits hospitals’ ability to sell patient debt to third-party buyers.

In 2021, the California Labor Commissioner’s Office fined Torrance Car Wash more than $800,000 for labor code violations affecting its employees.

Recognizing that Holocaust survivors face significant challenges within the justice system, the Claims Conference on Jewish Material Claims Against Germany opened a Supplemental Hardship Fund in December 2020 to support survivors during the COVID-19 pandemic. The fund issued two payments over two years, each amounting to €1,200 (approximately $1,400). In 2021, Bet Tzedek received hundreds of reports that the Social Security Administration (SSA) mislabeled these payments as income, which negatively impacted survivors’ other government benefits. Impoverished survivors throughout the country received notices from the SSA threatening to terminate their crucial public benefits and charging them with large overpayments. Bet Tzedek intervened to address disruptions in low-income survivors’ essential public benefits payments to protect their independence, economic security, and quality of life. Bet Tzedek’s sole Holocaust Reparations Attorney managed 232 Supplemental Hardship Fund cases in 2021, which could bring in over $600,000 for low-income Holocaust survivors in Los Angeles.

=== 2022 ===
In July 2022, Bet Tzedek launched a trauma-focused Medical-Legal Partnership (MLP) at Harbor-UCLA Medical Center to address legal issues that affect patient health, including housing, public benefits, employment, and protective orders, and to reach underserved populations who may not otherwise seek legal assistance. Bet Tzedek’s services help trauma patients obtain restraining orders, secure safe housing, and maximize government benefits, all of which contribute to improving health outcomes for underserved and vulnerable communities.

=== 2023 ===
In December 2023, Bet Tzedek assisted in securing a landmark settlement for 148 residential care workers whose wages were stolen. The workers from six Adat Shalom Residential Care for the Elderly facilities received a $5.5 million settlement. They reached this victory with support from the Pilipino Workers Center. The majority of the workers were Filipino immigrants and were paid as little as $2.40 an hour. Bet Tzedek represented workers during a 16-day hearing that led to this settlement.

Bet Tzedek provided legal services and a labor rights workshop to survivors of labor exploitation and child labor at two LA poultry processing plants in La Puente and City of Industry owned by Tony Bran. A settlement of nearly $3.8 million was reached for the workers. Federal authorities alleged kids as young as 14 were illegally working dangerous jobs. Eventually, the chicken ended up at major supermarkets and distributors like Ralphs, Aldi, Grocery Outlet, and Sysco.

Bet Tzedek secured letters of interest for over 60 car wash workers at one job site so they can receive deferred action and immigration protection for participating in an investigation of labor violations.

=== 2024 ===
On September 30, 2024, SB 1103 was signed into law by Governor Gavin Newsom. The bill provided language justice through translated leases, added transparency to prevent hidden fees, included standards for charges related to building operation costs, and provided longer notice periods for rent increases or termination of tenancies. Bet Tzedek co-sponsored this bill, authored by Senator Caroline Menjivar, along with CAMEO Network, Inclusive Action for the City, the Lawyers’ Committee for Civil Rights of the San Francisco Bay Area, Public Counsel, and Small Business Majority.

In August 2024, Kim Selfon, Bet Tzedek’s IHSS & Medi-Cal Policy Specialist, consulted with the U.S. Department of Justice regarding a lawsuit alleging that Los Angeles County violated the Americans with Disabilities Act (ADA) by failing to provide accessible polling places for voters with disabilities. Kim’s input contributed to a settlement in which the County will collaborate with an independent accessibility expert for three years to ensure polling locations are accessible or can be made accessible through temporary measures. The expert will also provide semiannual reports to the County and the DOJ.

In August 2024, Bet Tzedek attorneys Emily Chong and Jessica Marsella delivered written comments and in-person testimony to the Board of Supervisors who voted to approve measures addressing over $2.9 billion in medical debt affecting low-income residents of L.A. County. They presented two client stories to illustrate the need for greater transparency from hospitals regarding how they offer charity care and financial assistance before beginning collection efforts. In approving the measure, the County Supervisors demonstrated the importance of preventing anxiety from unpaid medical bills from weighing upon individuals in low-income and minority communities, as well as people suffering with chronic conditions.

In March 2024, Los Angeles County agreed to a $12-million settlement to resolve allegations that its home improvement lending program wrecked the finances of many borrowers and left them vulnerable to foreclosure via PACE loans. Bet Tzedek, Public Counsel, and Hogan Lovells represented homeowners in the two lawsuits.

In December 2024, the Employment Rights Project (ERP) contributed to the efforts surrounding the $1.3 million in fines for wage theft restitution and civil penalties against 19 car washes in the South Bay area of Los Angeles County and in Orange County. The Department of Industrial Relations (DIR) found that the car washes were engaged in practices violating labor laws, impacting 960 workers.

== Services and programs ==
The organization serves Greater Los Angeles’s community as well as populations across California. Bet Tzedek’s broad range of free legal services are divided into five collective groups of programs and services made available to: seniors and dependent adults; taxpayers, workers, and small businesses; tenants, homeowners, and unhoused individuals; children and families; and LGBTQ+ individuals and communities.

=== Seniors, dependent adults, and Caregivers ===
Bet Tzedek provides comprehensive legal assistance to low-income seniors, dependent adults, and their families in Los Angeles, focusing on a variety of services to enhance their quality of life. These include support for accessing justice in cases of elder abuse, assistance with advanced healthcare directives and estate planning, and legal guidance for guardianship and conservatorship matters. Bet Tzedek also offers a specialized program for Holocaust survivors, helping them secure reparations and providing legal aid nationwide through its Holocaust Survivors Justice Network. The organization addresses the legal needs of older adults through initiatives such as the Self-Help Conservatorship Clinic.

=== Workers, taxpayers, and Small Business Owners ===
Bet Tzedek supports low-wage workers and small business owners in Los Angeles by providing legal guidance, education, and direct representation to help them achieve financial stability and overcome legal challenges. The Low-Income Taxpayer Initiative assists individuals and families with resolving tax disputes with the IRS and California Franchise Tax Board, addressing issues like audits, collections, and garnishments. The Employment Rights Project helps workers, including undocumented immigrants, secure fair wages and safe working conditions through education and legal representation for wage theft and workplace violations. Bet Tzedek also offers a weekly Employment Rights Project Clinic to provide legal advice on employment issues. The Small Business Development Project supports entrepreneurs by offering legal assistance and educational resources, helping them navigate the complexities of business formation, contracts, leasing, and employee rights.

=== Tenants, Homeowners, and Unhoused Individuals ===
Bet Tzedek advocates for access to stable and affordable housing by offering legal services and resources to tenants, homeowners, and individuals experiencing homelessness. The Eviction Defense Program provides legal representation to tenants facing eviction, rent hikes, or landlord harassment, as part of the Stay Housed L.A. initiative. The Preventing and Ending Homelessness Project offers legal aid to individuals at risk of homelessness or currently unhoused, addressing issues like unlawful evictions, access to public benefits, and expunging criminal records. Bet Tzedek also supports low-income homeowners through education and legal assistance to protect them from foreclosure, fraud, and property tax issues related to the Property Assessed Clean Energy (PACE) program.

=== Children and Families ===
Bet Tzedek provides legal assistance to children and families, focusing on issues such as legal U.S. residency, guardianship, gender-affirming identification documents, and access to public benefits. The organization supports children with diverse experiences, including unaccompanied minors seeking refuge, those raised by relatives other than their parents, and transgender or gender non-conforming youth. Bet Tzedek helps caregivers secure legal guardianship, as well as access adoption, foster care, and educational benefits. The organization also assists undocumented minors in obtaining Special Immigrant Juvenile Status, asylum, or other forms of relief. Through a partnership with Harbor-UCLA Medical Center, Bet Tzedek provides legal services to patients whose health is impacted by legal issues. Additionally, the organization advocates for transgender youth’s rights to healthcare, protection from discrimination, and legal gender recognition.

=== LGBTQ+ Individuals & Communities ===
Bet Tzedek advocates for the legal rights of transgender, non-binary, and gender non-conforming individuals. The organization provides legal assistance in areas such as access to medical care, employment discrimination, housing disputes, and education-related issues. Bet Tzedek’s Transgender Legal Rights Program offers clinics and direct representation for issues like health insurance denials, housing and employment discrimination, and public accommodations. Additionally, Bet Tzedek assists with legal name and gender marker changes on identification documents to help individuals access public benefits, healthcare, employment, and education.
