= Diamond Bakery =

Jewish bakery in Los Angeles

Coordinates: 34°04′38″N 118°21′42″W

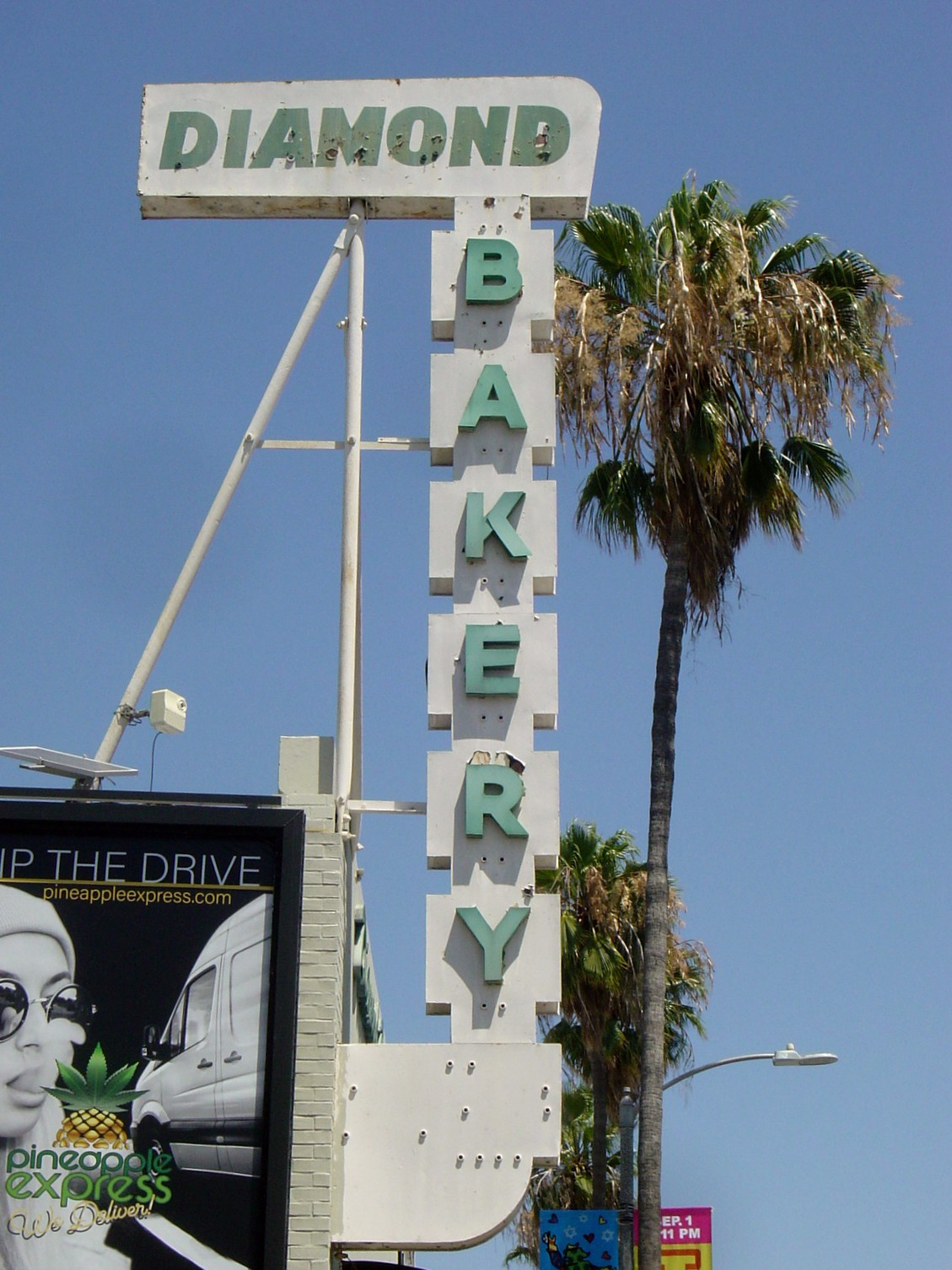
- Diamond Bakery rooftop sign in 2019
- Formation: 1946; 80 years ago
- Founders: Betty and Jack Segal
- Founded at: Boyle Heights, Los Angeles, California
- Dissolved: December 3, 2023; 2 years ago
- Owner: Brian Hollander; Doug Weinstein
- Website: www.diamondbakeryla.com

Diamond Bakery was a Jewish bakery located on Fairfax Avenue in Los Angeles. Founded in 1946 by Betty and Jack Segal, the bakery was sold to a group of Holocaust survivors in 1969, and sold again to a group of its employees shortly before the COVID-19 pandemic. In 2021, it again came under new ownership after financial trouble during the pandemic led head baker Ramon Luna to consider shutting the bakery down. The bakery closed permanently on December 3, 2023.

Diamond Bakery supplied breads, bagels, and other baked goods to various Jewish delis in the Los Angeles area, including Nate 'n Al's as well as Greenblatt's prior to its closure, and to synagogues including the Wilshire Boulevard Temple. The bakery also sold baked goods at its storefront on Fairfax Avenue, where activity tended to increase on important Jewish holidays. Upon the closure of Diamond Bakery, its decades-old sourdough starter and bread recipes were sold to wholesale company Bread Los Angeles.

== History ==
=== Establishment ===
Diamond Bakery was established in 1946 by Betty Segal and Jack Segal, Jewish immigrants from Eastern Europe who brought their recipes with them. The bakery was initially in Boyle Heights, Los Angeles, before being moved to 335 North Fairfax Avenue, where it remained until its closing. This move corresponded with an influx of Jews coming to Fairfax from Boyle Heights after the Supreme Court of the United States issued a decision that struck down racially restrictive housing covenants, which previously prevented Jews and other minorities from purchasing housing in western Los Angeles. Canter's, a Jewish deli previously located in Boyle Heights, also moved to Fairfax Avenue in 1948.

The Segals, along with Diamond Bakery's first workers, were recent Jewish immigrants. The bakery's sourdough starter is believed to have been active for more than a century, which would make it older than the bakery itself; its age has also been reported as 75 years.

=== The Lottmans and Rubensteins ===
In 1969, the Segals sold Diamond Bakery to two couples: Arlene and Sol Lottman and Nate and Ruth Rubinstein. Three of the four new owners were Holocaust survivors; some literature suggests that the couples first met at Auschwitz concentration camp. Ruth Rubinstein retired in 2019, passing ownership to a son; Mark Lottman, Arlene and Sol's son, subsequently managed the bakery. Shortly after Rubinstein's retirement, Lottman decided to close the bakery, but instead sold it to a group of its Latino employees; many of them had been working at Diamond Bakery for decades.

=== Sale to employees ===
Shortly before the COVID-19 pandemic, Mark Lottman sold Diamond Bakery to its longtime head baker Ramon Luna and a group of other employees. The employees pooled their money in order to make the purchase. Luna's son Raymond Luna served as president of the bakery, and before the pandemic purchased the bakery's first card reader and coffee bar as well as installing chalkboard menus. However, the loss of both foot traffic and wholesaling opportunities due to the pandemic forced Luna to consider closing permanently. Hours were cut to avoid layoffs. In July 2020, Diamond Bakery had made baked goods available on various online food ordering platforms and started a GoFundMe campaign with the goal of raising $400,000 to stay open.

=== Hollander and Weinstein ===
People say to me, 'Oh, you're the new owner.' I just pay the bills. It's a community thing, I'm just responsible for keeping it going.

— Doug Weinstein

In early 2021, Brian Hollander and Doug Weinstein drove to Los Angeles from their hometown of Santa Barbara, California, to visit Canter's deli. Hollander and Weinstein, who had become friends while cooking meals for the elderly and baking challah with the Jewish Federation of Greater Santa Barbara, visited Diamond Bakery after Canter's; the two establishments are located on adjacent blocks. Luna and Weinstein had already met, and Luna gave the two men a tour. They decided to purchase Diamond Bakery before leaving, and began brainstorming a business plan while driving back to Santa Barbara. Weinstein, an experienced pastry chef, became chief operating officer and director of bakery operations, while Hollander became chief operating officer and director of business operations. Hollander also became director of L'Dor V'Dough, the newly established nonprofit arm of the bakery. Luna was named the chief baking officer.

Hollander and Weinstein implemented a profit sharing model in which shares in the bakery are set aside for the employees and pay out in the form of bonus pay and retirement packages, and additionally gave all employees a pay raise. On June 28, 2021, Diamond Bakery held a re-opening event.

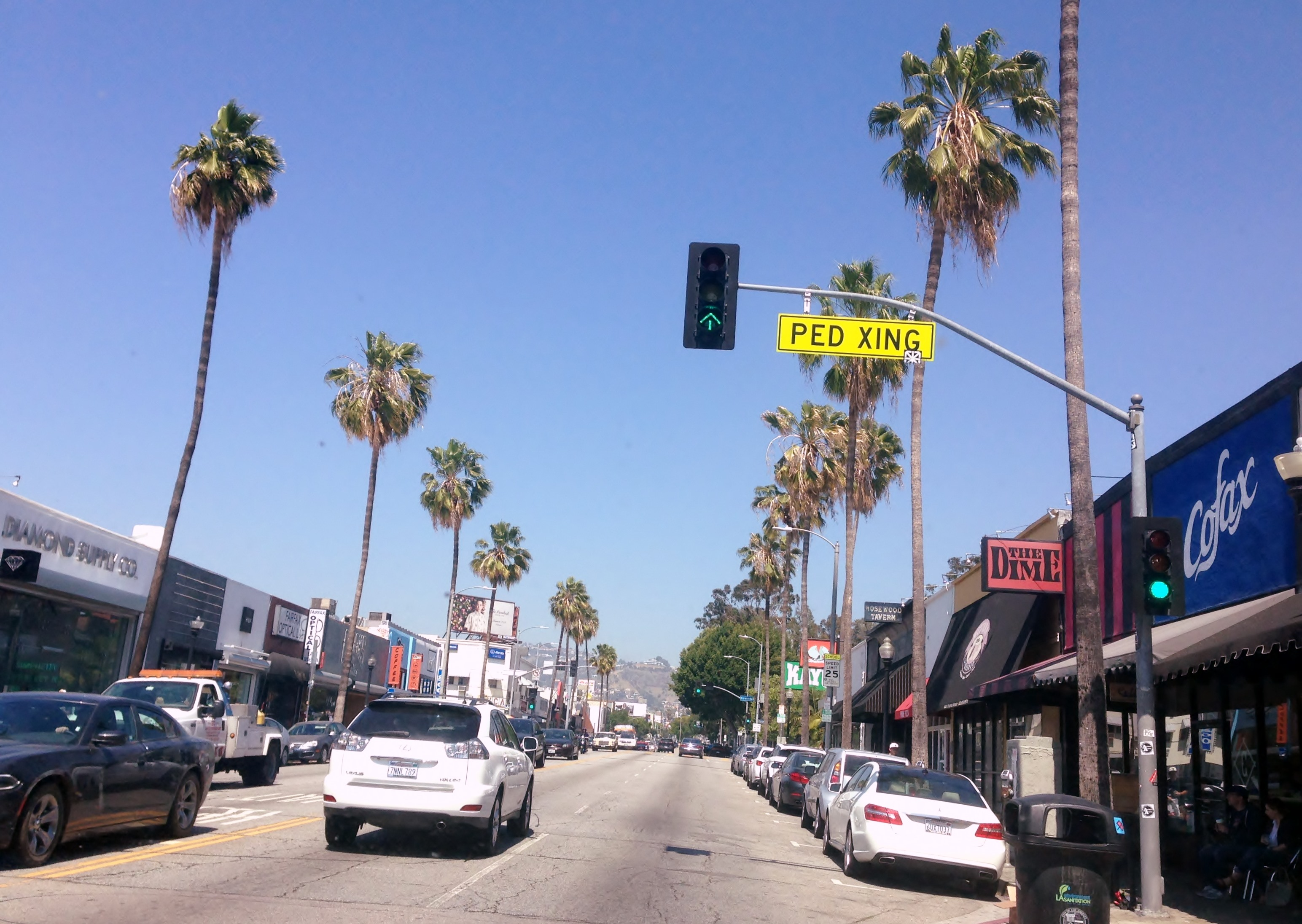
Fairfax Avenue near Diamond Bakery in 2016

Changes in the makeup of the Fairfax District led to continued struggle for Diamond Bakery, as Jewish life in Los Angeles shifted toward Pico-Robertson and streetwear stores proliferated on Fairfax Avenue. Some neighboring businesses closed, and some regular customers at the bakery died.

In November 2023, the Larchmont Chronicle reported that operations at "Jewish institution" Diamond Bakery were continuing but that Weinstein had expressed that business was difficult. The bakery closed permanently on December 3, 2023, after 77 years in operation. Doug Weinstein told Eater that the bakery was not profitable even with a combination of in-store, online, and delivery sales, and that maintenance of the retail location was too expensive; he stated that the water pipes at the location were failing. The original recipes for Diamond Bakery bread, and the bakery's sourdough starter, were sold to wholesaler Bread Los Angeles; breads are sold at Viktor Benes Continental Bakery and at certain Gelson's Markets locations.

As of October 9, 2024, the roof of the Bakery, and the adjoining building, had caved in. The cause is currently unknown.
