= Fairfax Historic District =

Fairfax Historic District may refer to:

- Fairfax Historic District (Valley, Alabama), listed on the National Register of Historic Places (NRHP)
- Beverly Fairfax Historic District, Los Angeles, California, NRHP-listed in Los Angeles
- Parkfairfax Historic District, Alexandria, Virginia, NRHP-listed
- City of Fairfax Historic District, Fairfax, Virginia, NRHP-listed
