= Fairfax District, Los Angeles =

Fairfax District
- Neighborhood of Los Angeles
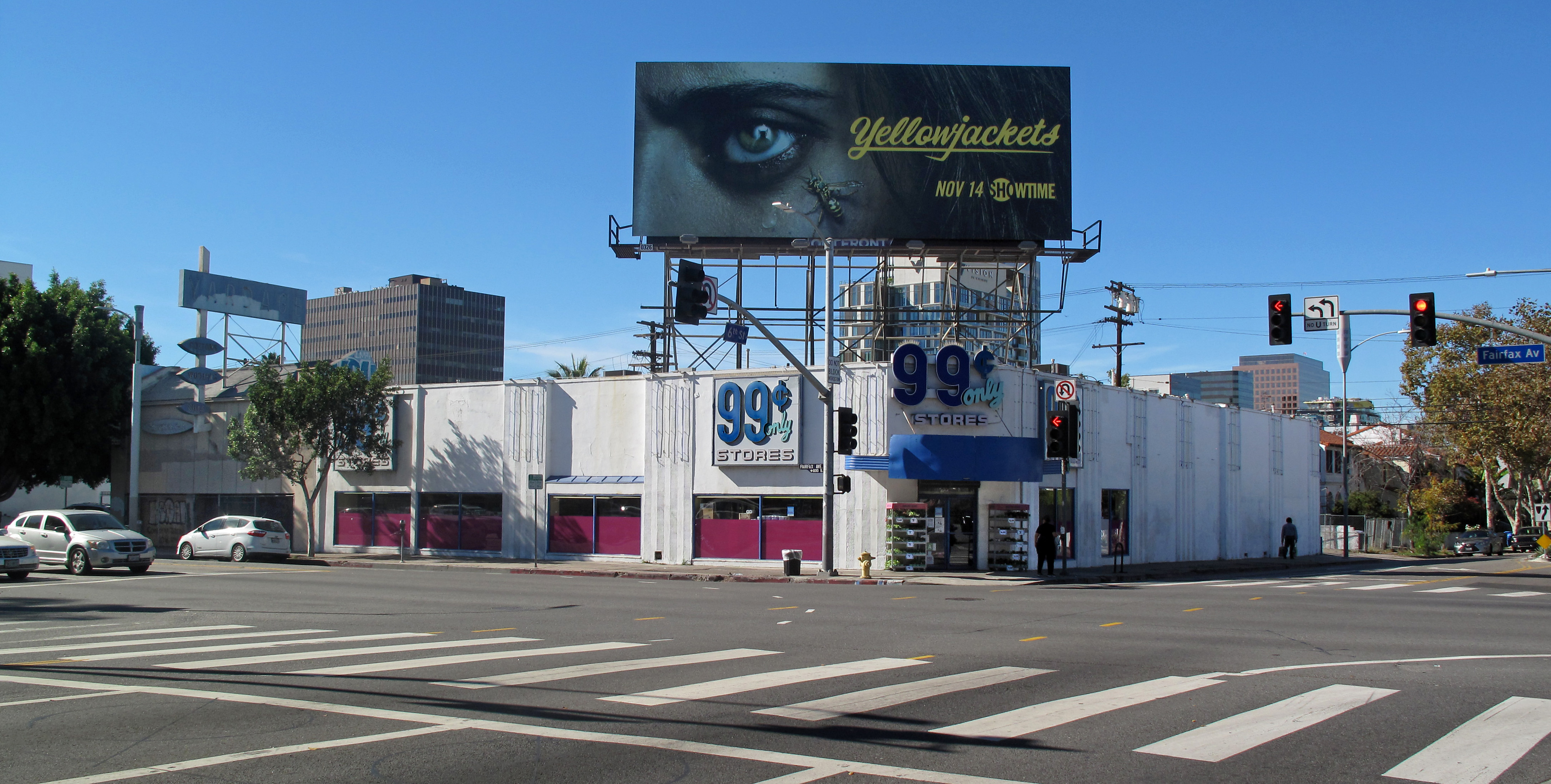
- Fairfax Avenue, 2021

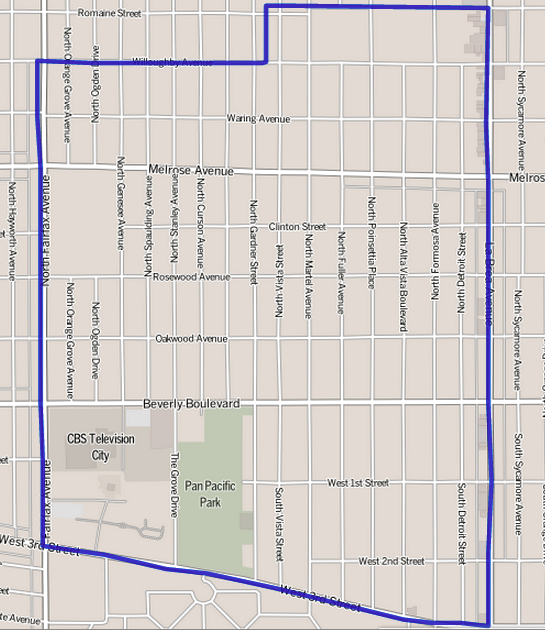
- Map of the Fairfax District of Los Angeles, as delineated by the Los Angeles Times

- Location within Western Los Angeles Location within Los Angeles County
- Coordinates: 34.07884°N 118.361487°W

The Fairfax District is a neighborhood in the Central region of Los Angeles, California.

Historically the Fairfax District has been a center of the Jewish community in Los Angeles. It is known for the Farmers Market, The Grove, CBS Television City broadcasting center, the Los Angeles Museum of the Holocaust in Pan Pacific Park, the Beverly-Fairfax Historic District neighborhood, and Fairfax Avenue restaurants and shops.

== Geography ==
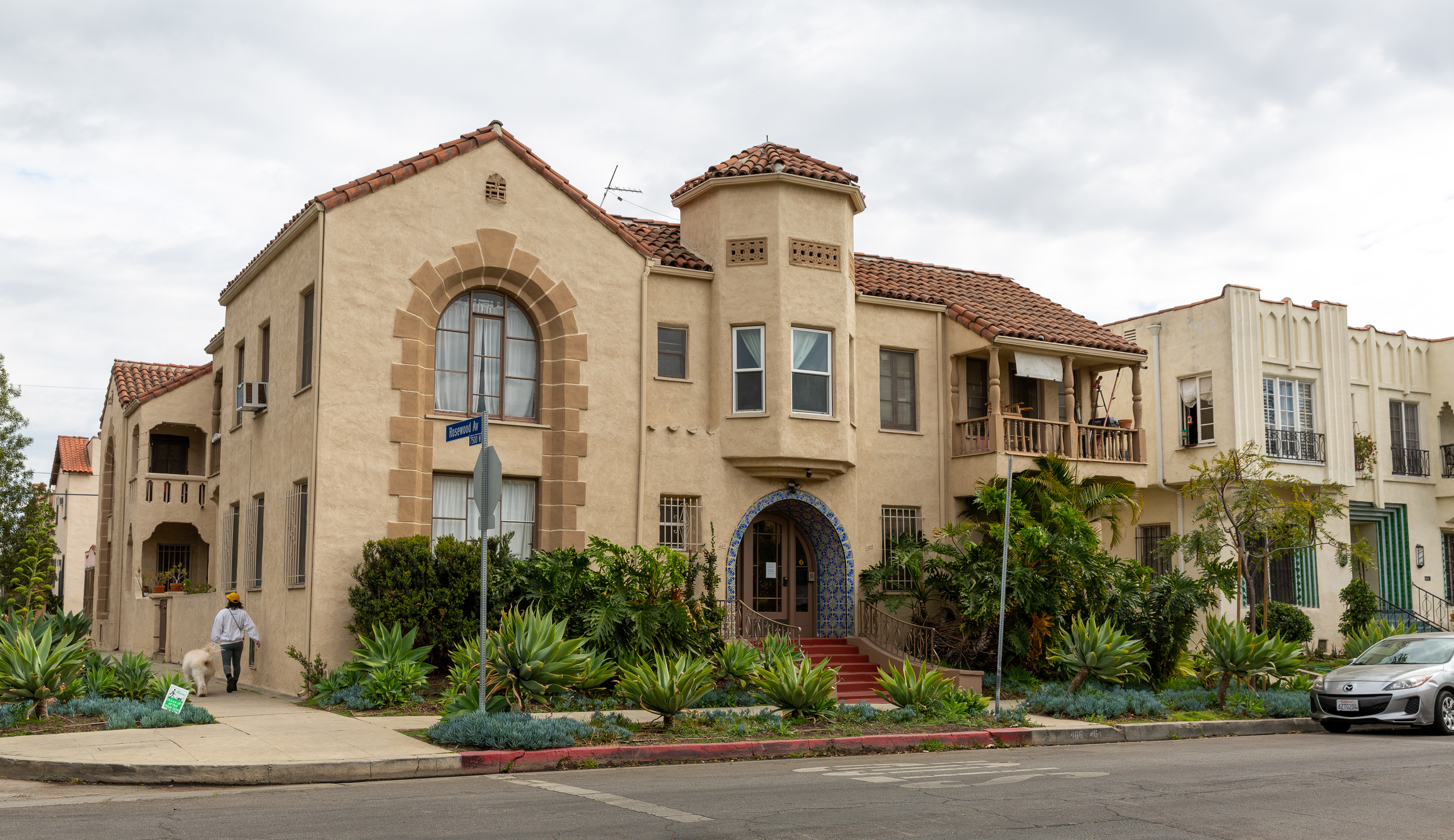
Beverly Fairfax Historic District.

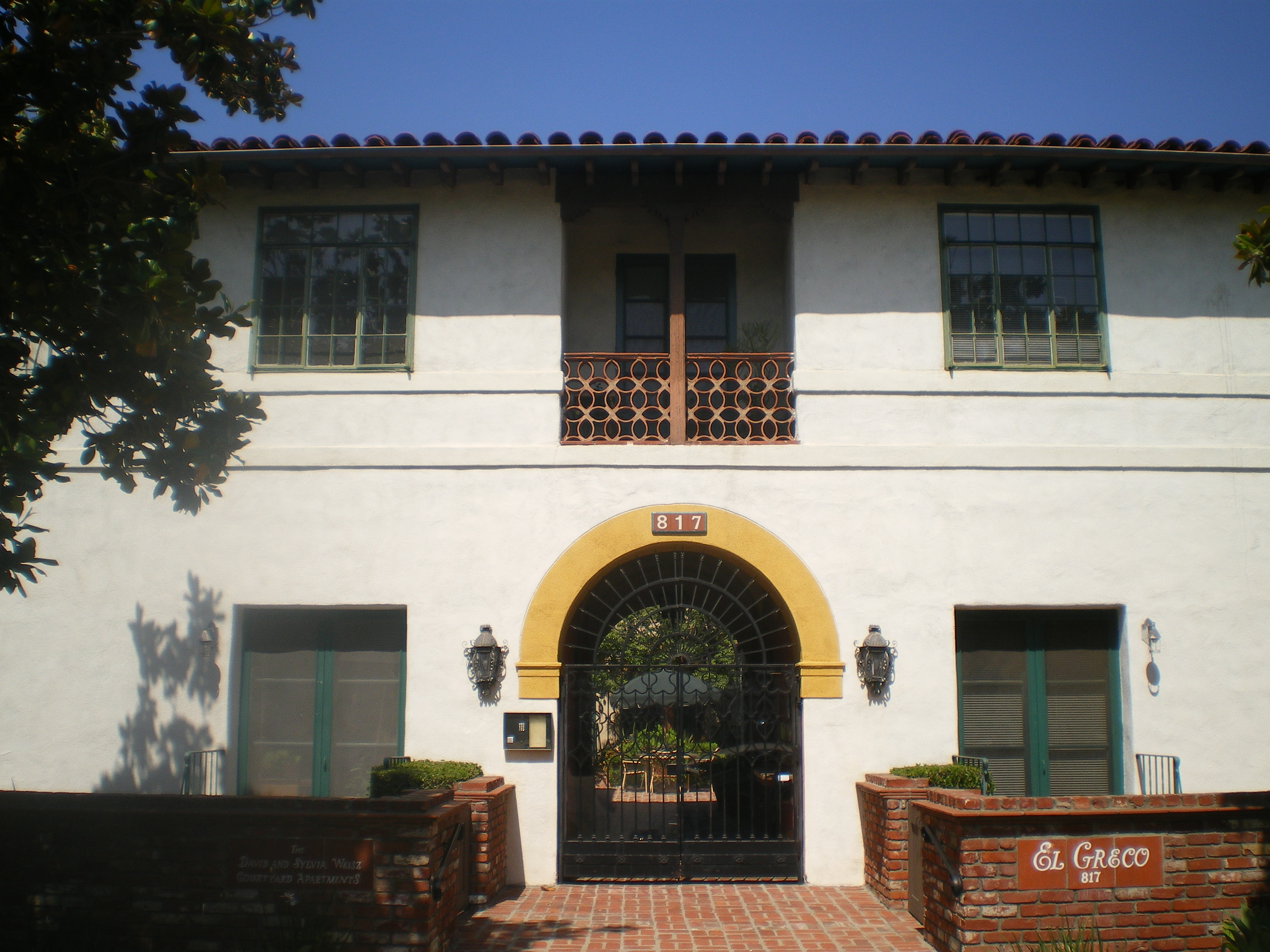
The historic Mission Revival style El Greco Apartments, built 1929.

Beverly–Fairfax (sometimes simply called Fairfax) is a 3.2-square-mile neighborhood bordered by Willoughby Avenue on the north, Wilshire Boulevard on the south, La Brea Avenue on the east, and La Cienega Boulevard on the west.

ArcGIS, Here Maps, Bing Maps, and MapQuest do not mark boundaries, but center the words "Fairfax" or "Fairfax District" near the intersection of Beverly Boulevard and Fairfax Avenue.

The Mapping L.A. project of the Los Angeles Times, in a departure from its first draft, reduces the Fairfax District to the 1.23 square miles of the neighborhood that lie east of Fairfax Avenue. Using the Mapping L.A. boundaries, the Fairfax District is flanked on the north and northeast by the city of West Hollywood, on the northeast by Hollywood, on the east by Hancock Park, on the south by Mid-Wilshire, and on the west by Beverly Grove. Street boundaries are Willoughby Avenue or Romaine Street on the north, La Brea Avenue on the east, West Third Street on the south, and Fairfax Avenue on the west. The Beverly–Fairfax (or Fairfax) neighborhood, as it has historically been called, includes both Fairfax and Beverly Grove. In the first draft of Mapping L.A., "Beverly Grove" was not included as a distinct neighborhood; rather, the area was shown as part of Fairfax. An even earlier L.A. Times profile of the Fairfax District described the boundaries as "Santa Monica Boulevard on the north and Sixth Street on the south; La Brea Avenue forms its eastern edge with Sweetzer Avenue as its western border."

== Demographics ==
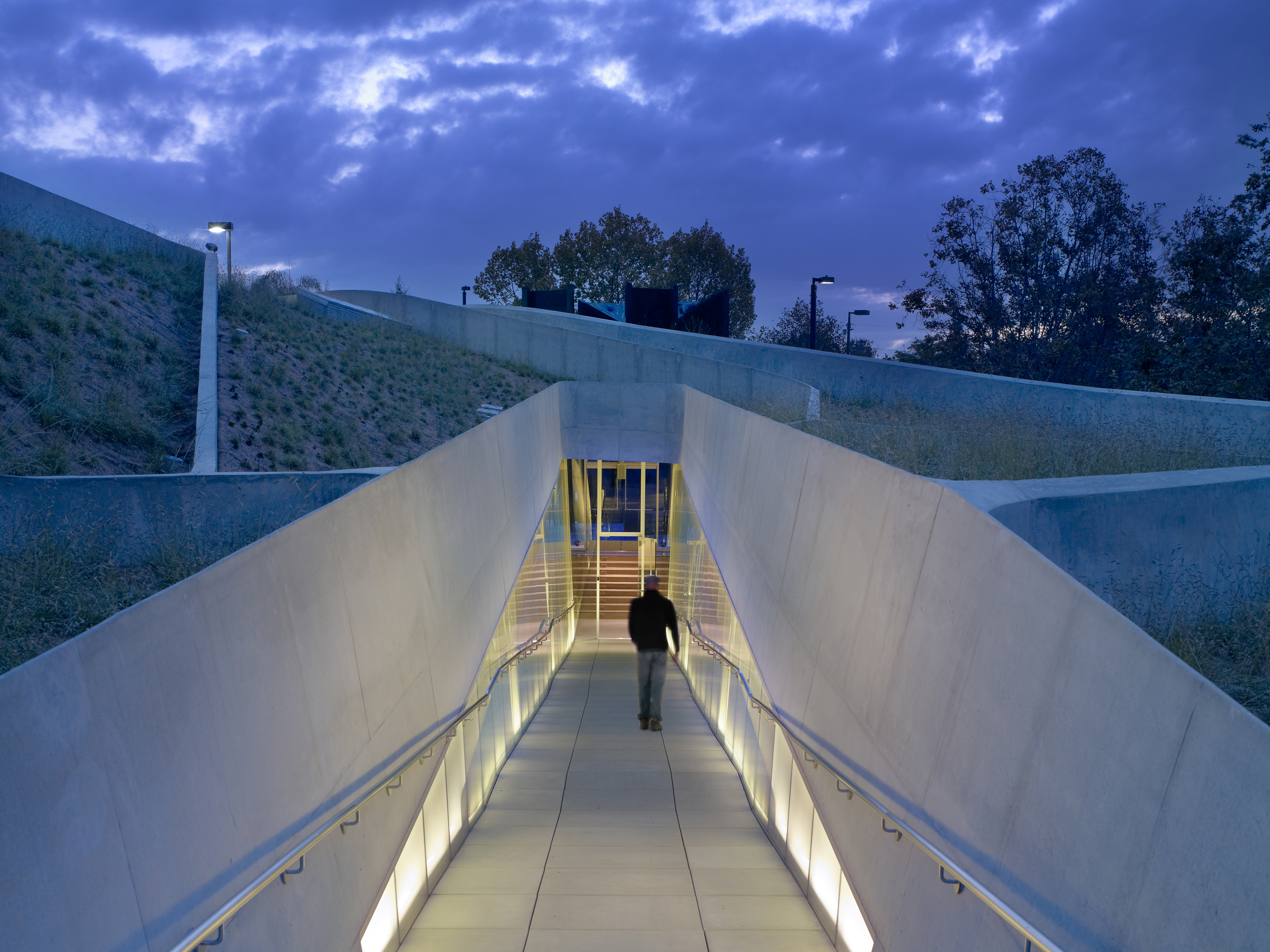
Holocaust Museum LA.

The following data applies to the boundaries of Fairfax set by Mapping L.A.:

The 2000 U.S. census counted 12,490 residents in the 1.23-square-mile neighborhood—an average of 10,122 people per square mile, about the same population density as all of Los Angeles. In 2008, the city estimated that the population had increased to 13,360.

The median age for residents was 33, a general average within Los Angeles. The percentage of residents aged 65 and older was among the county's highest.

Fifty-four percent of Fairfax residents aged 25 and older had earned a four-year degree by 2000, a high figure for both the city and the county.

The median yearly household income in 2008 dollars was $65,938, average in comparison to the rest of Los Angeles. The average household size of two people was low for the city of Los Angeles. Renters occupied 71.5% of the housing stock, and house- or apartment owners 28.5%.

The percentages of never-married men (54.9%) and never-married women (45.5%) were among the county's highest.

=== Ethnic composition ===
In the 2000 U.S. census, the racial breakdown was White (84.7%), Latino (5.9%), Asian (4.5%), Black (2.2%), and other (2.8%). Ukraine (8.9%) and Mexico (7.8%) were the most common places of birth for the 23.2% of the residents who were born abroad, a lower ratio than the rest of Los Angeles.

== History ==
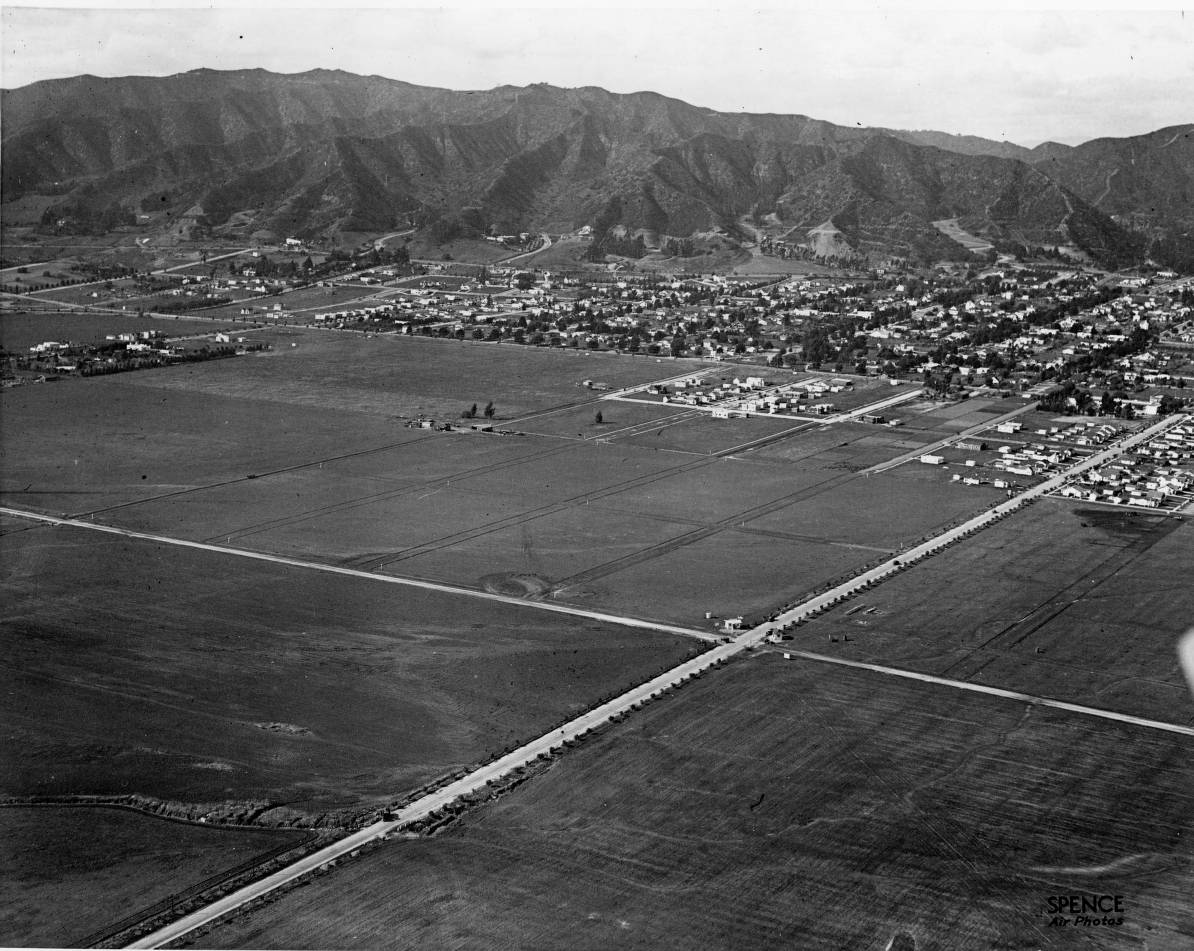
Fairfax before development. The two lower right plots belong to the Fairfax District.

Historically, the Fairfax District has been a center of the Jewish community in Los Angeles, after the earlier Boyle Heights period, which was home to the largest Jewish community west of Chicago in the 1920s and 1930s.

In 1935, there were four synagogues in the Fairfax District; by 1945, there were twelve. After World War II, more Jews began to populate the area. As more families moved in, religious schools and a Jewish Community Center sprang up. In 1974, Bet Tzedek Legal Services - The House of Justice, a legal aid charity, opened its doors across from the Farmers Market.

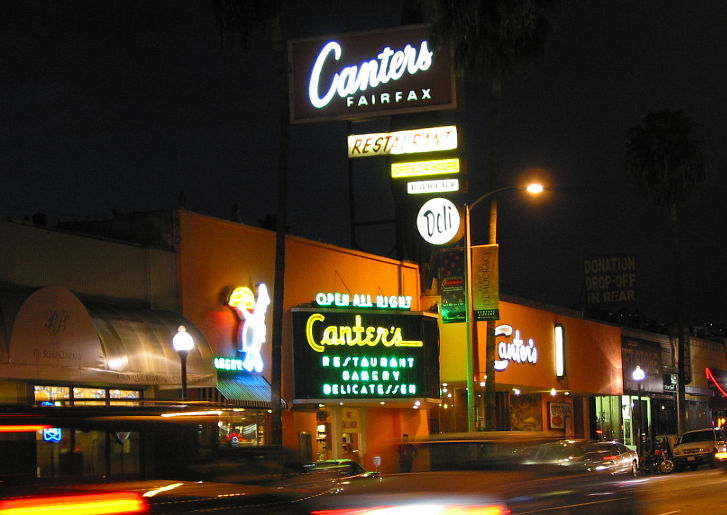
Canter's deli, a notable Fairfax restaurant, 2005

The Farmers Market at Fairfax Avenue and 3rd Street still retains a 1930s atmosphere, with open-air vegetable stalls and cafes, and many Jewish residents of the area still frequent the market as part of their shopping or kibbitzing routine. The Grove, a commercial retail and entertainment center, opened in 2002 next to the Farmer's Market.

The neighborhood east of Fairfax Avenue and north of Beverly Boulevard, consisting primarily of still-standing 1920s apartment buildings, was named the Beverly Fairfax Historic District by the City of Los Angeles in 2019. Now listed on the National Register of Historic Places, buildings in the neighborhood must have any exterior alterations approved by the Los Angeles Office of Historic Resources.

The intersection of Fairfax Avenue and Beverly Boulevard is officially recognized as Raoul Wallenberg Square, in honor of the Swedish diplomat who saved thousands of Hungarian Jews from deportation to Nazi death camps. The Los Angeles Museum of the Holocaust is located nearby, within Pan Pacific Park.

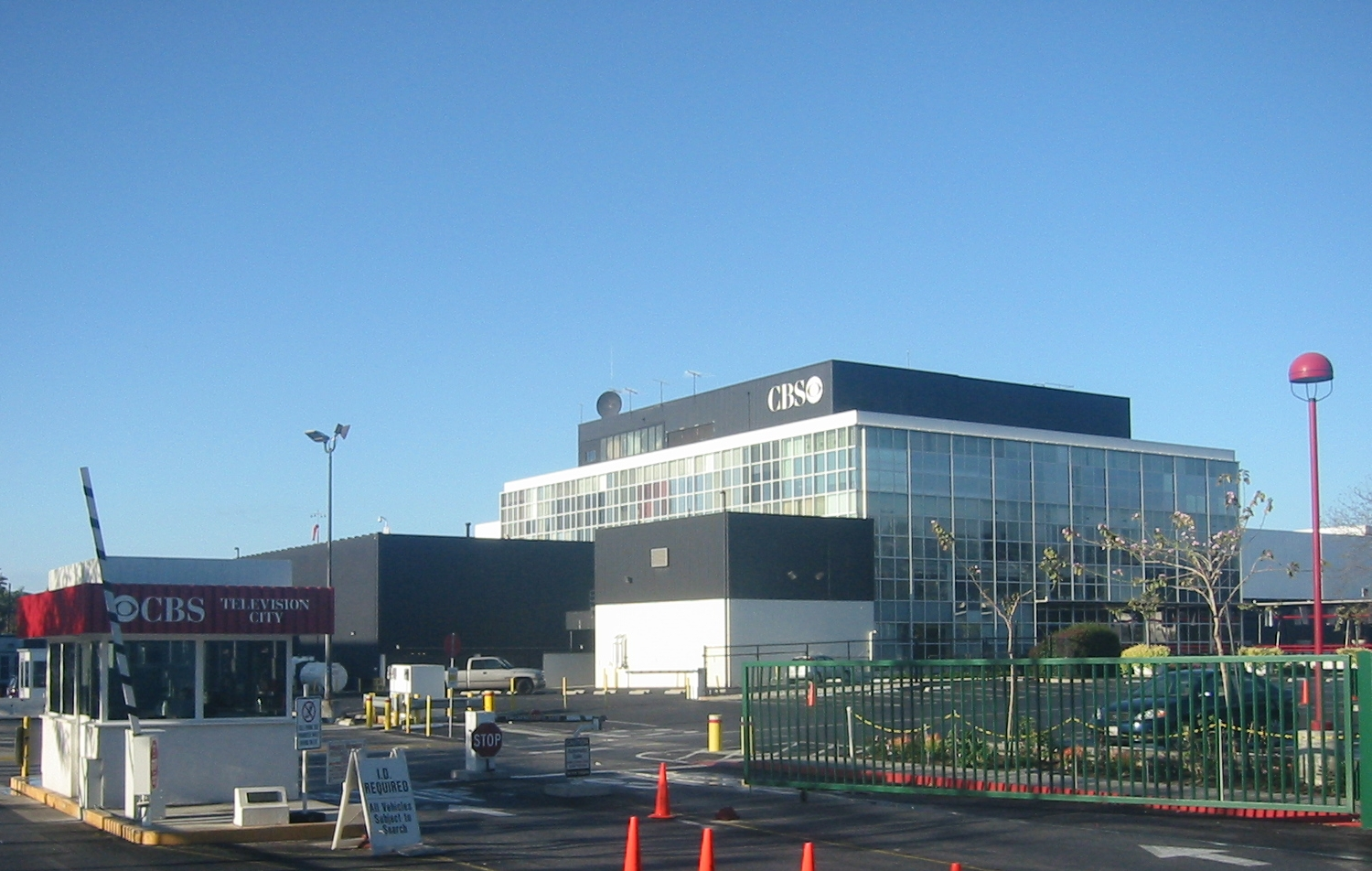
CBS Television City, 2007

CBS Television City was built in 1952 on the former site of Gilmore Stadium at Fairfax Avenue and Beverly Boulevard. The facility has been used to tape several shows both for CBS and other entities, the most notable being The Price is Right, which has shot in Studio 33 (later renamed for the game show's longtime host, Bob Barker) continuously since 1972.

== Services ==
=== Government ===
Federal

- California's 33rd congressional district

State

- California's 26th State Senate district
- California's 50th State Assembly district

City

- Los Angeles City Council District 4
- Los Angeles City Council District 5

The Los Angeles Fire Department operates Fire Station 61, serving the Fairfax community.

=== Education ===
The schools within Fairfax include:

- Fairfax High School, LAUSD, 7850 Melrose Avenue. The school was founded in 1924. Most of the original campus facilities were demolished in 1966 because the original Spanish Colonial Revival main building did not meet earthquake safety standards. The historic Dewitt Swann Auditorium and iconic Rotunda, however, were spared, retrofitted and are in daily use. Greenway Court, built in 1939 as a social hall by the students at Fairfax as a class project, was also spared and was moved to Fairfax Avenue, where it was converted into a theater in 1999 by the Greenway Arts Alliance and renamed the Greenway Court Theater.
- Bais Yaakov School for Girls, private secondary, 7353 Beverly Boulevard
- Bais Tzivia, chasidic school for girls, kindergarten-eighth grade, 7269 Beverly Blvd.
- Bnos Esther, chasidic girls high school, ninth-12th grade, 116 North La Brea Ave.
- Yeshivas Bais Toras Menachem, Chasidic Boys Yeshiva, 341 N Mansfield Ave.
- Cheder of Los Angeles, chasidic school kindergarten-eighth grade, 801 North La Brea Avenue
- The Otman Center, private secondary, 812 North Fairfax Avenue
- Yeshiva Rav-Isacsohn Toras Emes, 7011 Clinton Avenue
- Yeshiva Aharon Yaakov / Ohr Eliyahu, Ultra Orthodox K-12 boys and girls yeshiva, 241 South Detroit Street
- Yeshivas Hachaim, 7269 Beverly Blvd
- Yeshivas Ohev Shalom, 525 South Fairfax Avenue
- Yeshiva Gedolah of Los Angeles, 5444 West Olympic Boulevard
- Shalhevet Yeshiva High School, 910 South Fairfax Avenue
- Yeshiva Elchonon Chabad, 7215 Waring Avenue
- Yavneh Hebrew Academy, 5353 West Third Street
- Westside Community Adult School, LAUSD, 7850 Melrose Avenue
- Whitman Continuation School, LAUSD, 7795 Rosewood Avenue
- Melrose Avenue Elementary School, LAUSD, 731 North Detroit Street

== Notable places ==
- Canter's restaurant. Los Angeles magazine named Canter's waffles the Best Waffle in Los Angeles. Esquire magazine called Canter's Monte Cristo sandwich one of the best sandwiches in America.
- CBS Television City, which was built on the site of a former football field and race track and which opened on November 16, 1952.
- Farmers Market, consisting of food stalls, sit-down eateries, prepared food vendors and produce markets.
- The Grove, a shopping center that features a large center park with an animated fountain.
- Pan-Pacific Park on Third Avenue, built on the site of the former Pan-Pacific Auditorium. Location of the Los Angeles Museum of the Holocaust.
- Melrose Trading Post outdoor flea market

== Notable people ==
- Lynda Carter (born 1951), actress
- Susan Rasky (1952–2013), journalist
- Rebecca Schaeffer (1967–1989), actress and model
- Hillel Slovak (1962–1988), musician and guitarist of Red Hot Chili Peppers
- Phil Spector (1939–2021), record producer, songwriter, convicted murderer
- Zev Yaroslavsky (born 1948), member of the Los Angeles City Council and the Los Angeles County Board of Supervisors

== See also ==
- List of districts and neighborhoods of Los Angeles
