= Original Farmers Market =

Los Angeles Historic-Cultural Monument

The Original Farmers Market

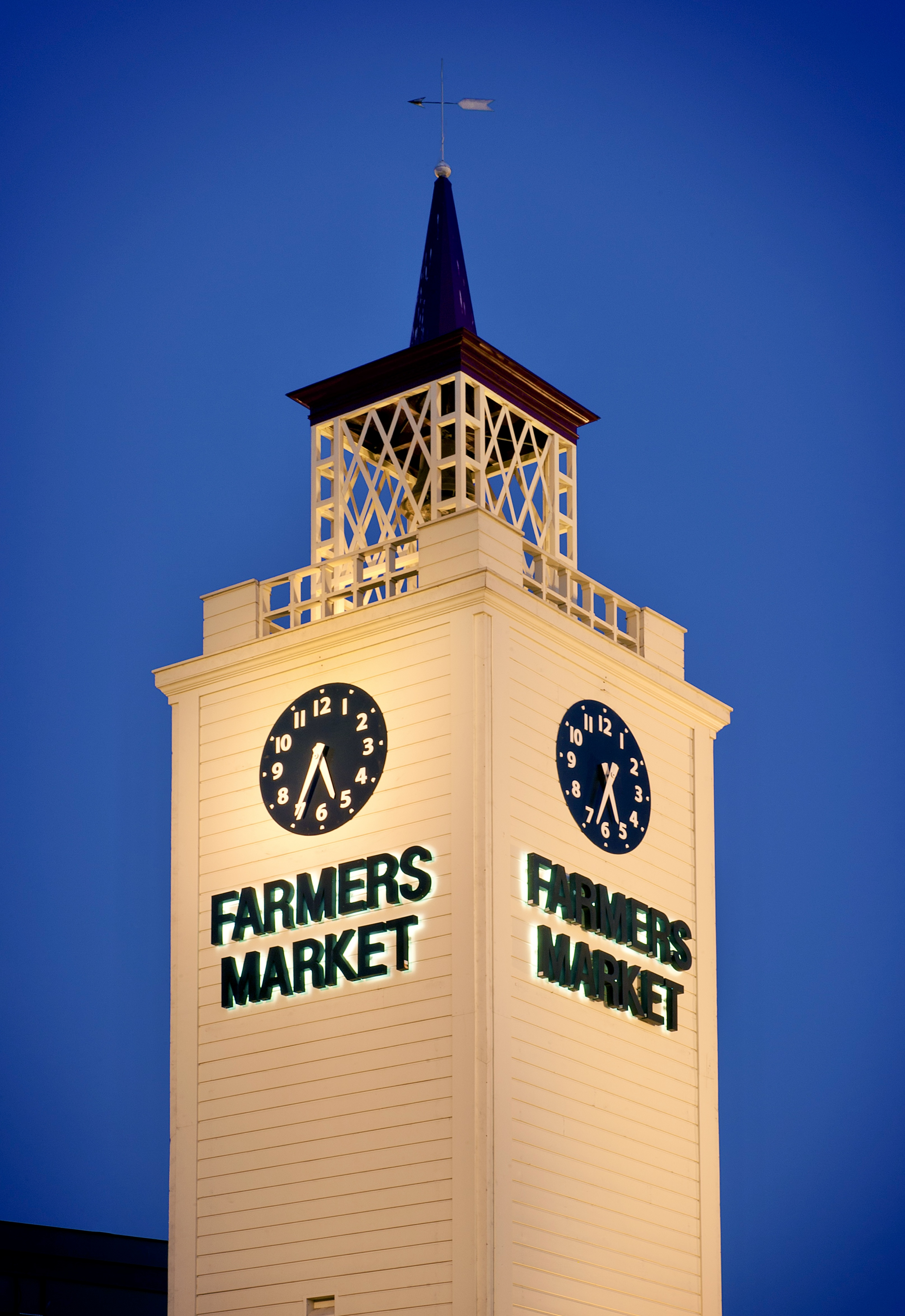
- The Original Farmers Market's iconic clock tower
- Location: Los Angeles, California, United States
- Coordinates: 34°4′21″N 118°21′37″W
- Address: 3rd Street and Fairfax Avenue
- Opened: 1934; 92 years ago
- Developer: Arthur Gilmore
- Num. of stores: More than 100
- Public transit: Wilshire/Fairfax; 16, 316, 17, 217, 780
- Website: www.farmersmarketla.com

Los Angeles Historic-Cultural Monument
- Designated: July 24, 1991
- Reference no.: 543

Original Farmers Market is an area of food stalls, sit-down eateries, prepared food vendors, and produce markets in the Fairfax District of Los Angeles, California, on the corner of Fairfax Avenue and 3rd Street. It first opened in 1934 and was designated Los Angeles Historic-Cultural Monument No. 543 in 1991.

Original Farmers Market features more than 100 vendors, including ready-to-eat foods, grocers, and tourist shops, and is located one block south of Television City. Unlike most farmers markets, Original Farmers Market is a permanent installation open seven days a week. Vendors serve many kinds of food, including American cuisine from local farmers and ethnic foods from Los Angeles's many immigrant communities. The market is adjacent to The Grove, and an electric-powered tram runs between the two destinations.

== History ==
Original Farmers Market's origins begin in 1880, when Arthur Fremont Gilmore and his partner bought two dairy farms in the Los Angeles area. Gilmore bought the land that is now the site of Original Farmers Market, while his partner bought the land that is now the site of The Grove. Ten years after their purchases, the partners split their holdings, with Gilmore taking control of the 256-acre (1.04 km^{2}) ranch and its dairy herd. Original Farmers Market started soon after, when a dozen farmers began parking their trucks on the ranch to sell produce to local residents. The cost to rent this space was $0.50 ($17.92 in 2025) per day.

Gilmore Oil Company replaced the farm when oil (part of the Salt Lake Oil Field) was discovered under the land in 1905.

Original Farmers Market was declared Los Angeles Historic-Cultural Monument No. 543 on July 24, 1991. The market the opened a second location in Los Angeles International Airport Terminal 5 in 2014. This second location features products from the original location's restaurants and stalls.

== In popular culture ==
The 1971 Beach Boys song "H.E.L.P. Is On the Way" indirectly refers to Original Farmers Market with the lyrics:

"We ate tonight at Fairfax and 3rd
(Fairfax and 3rd)
We're gonna spread the news and give you the word."

== Gallery ==
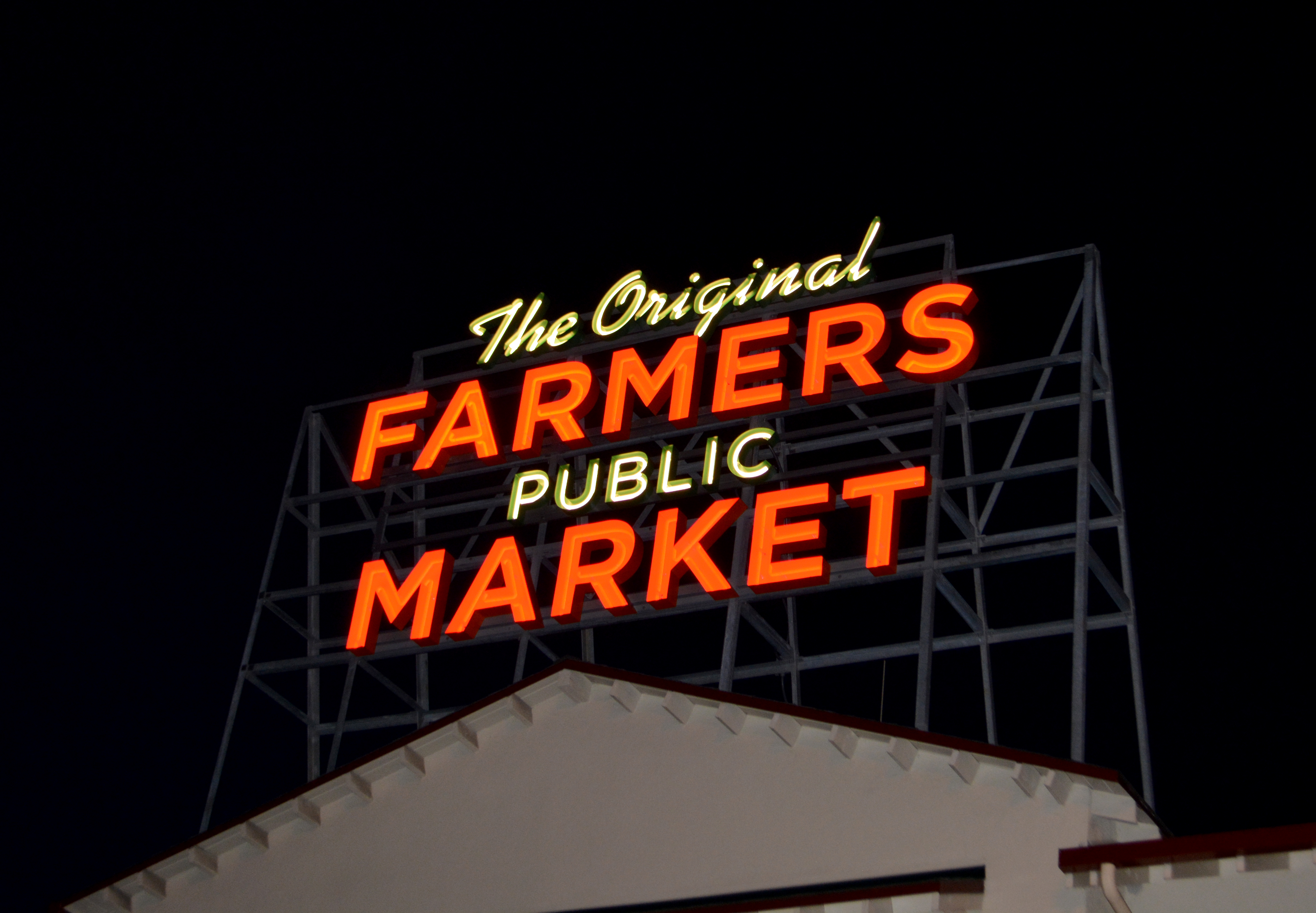
The Original Farmers Market Sign

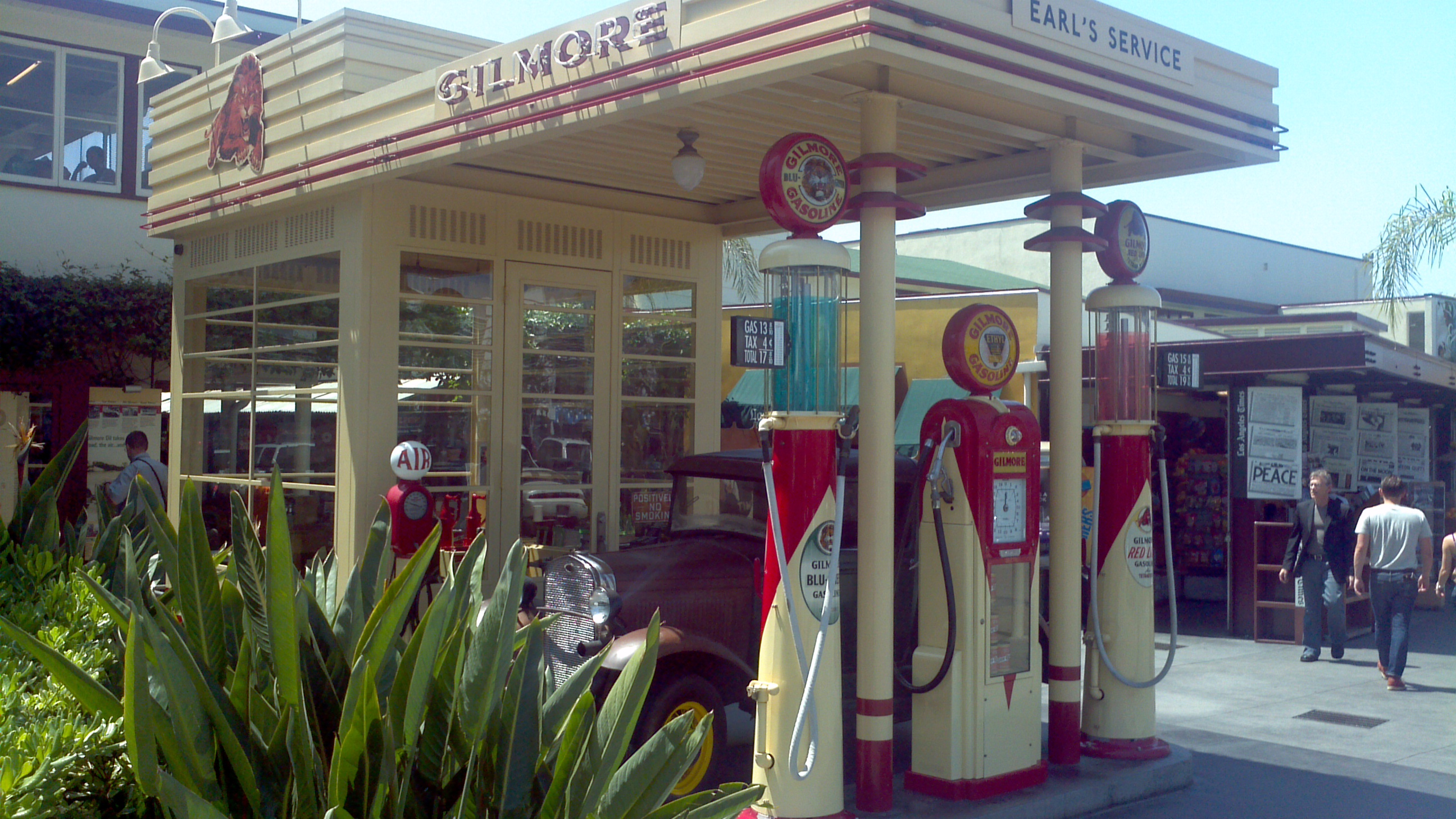
Replica Gilmore Oil Company gasoline station outside Original Farmers Market, 2012

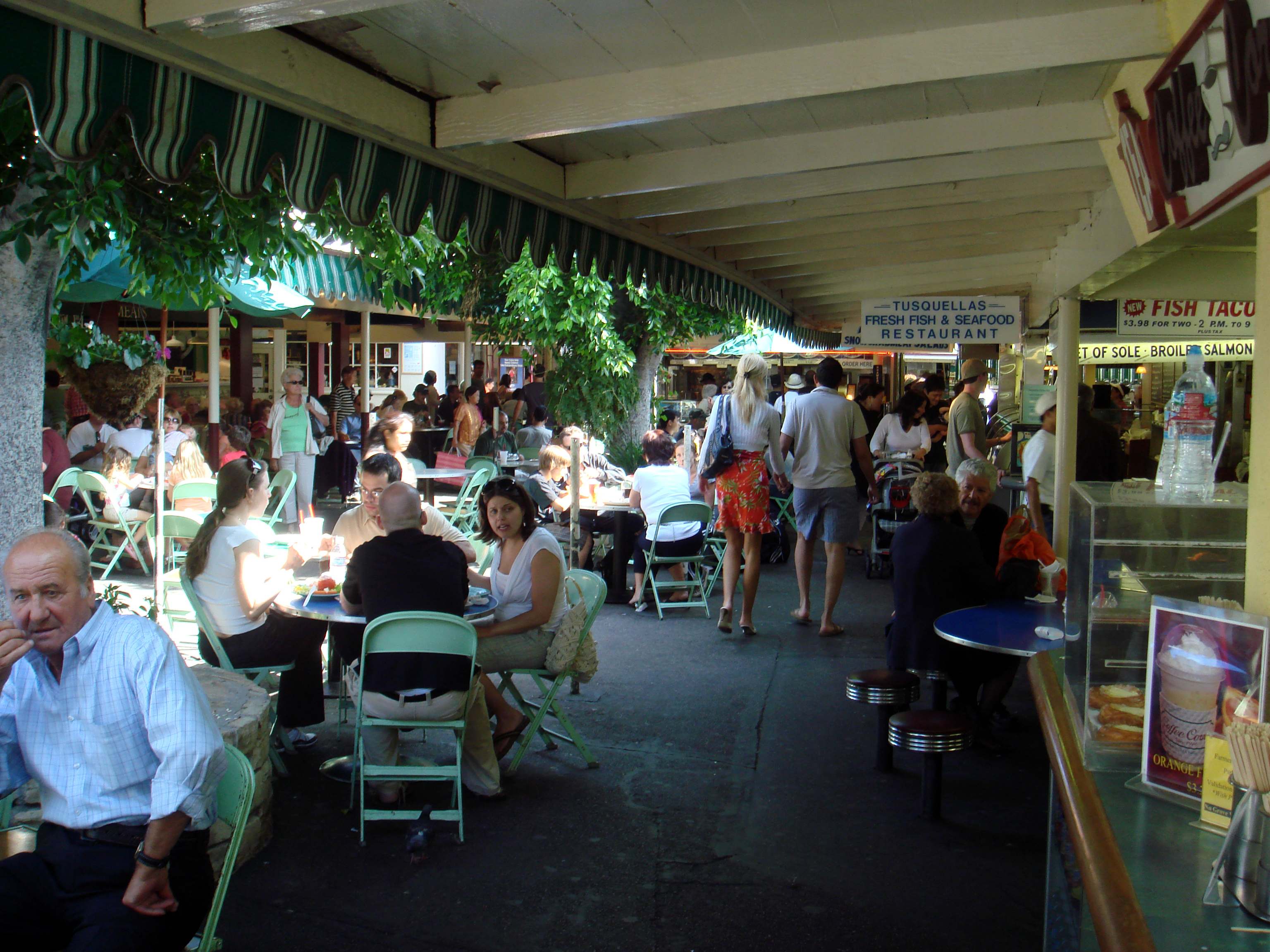
Typical day inside the alleys

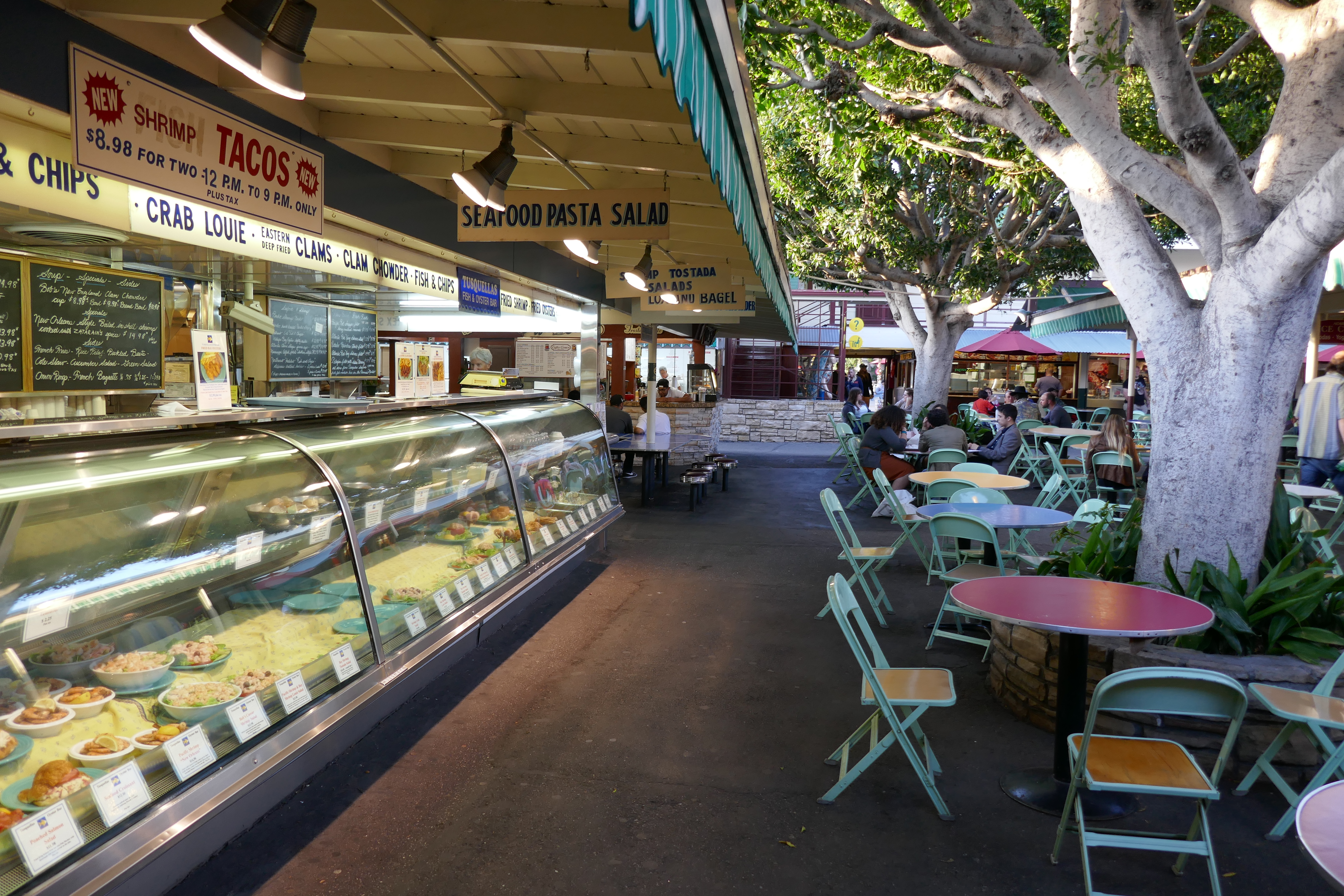
Food stalls inside the Farmers Market

== See also ==
- National Farmers Market Association
