= Canter's =

Delicatessen in Los Angeles, California, U.S.

Coordinates: 34.0788°N 118.3616°W

Canter's Deli
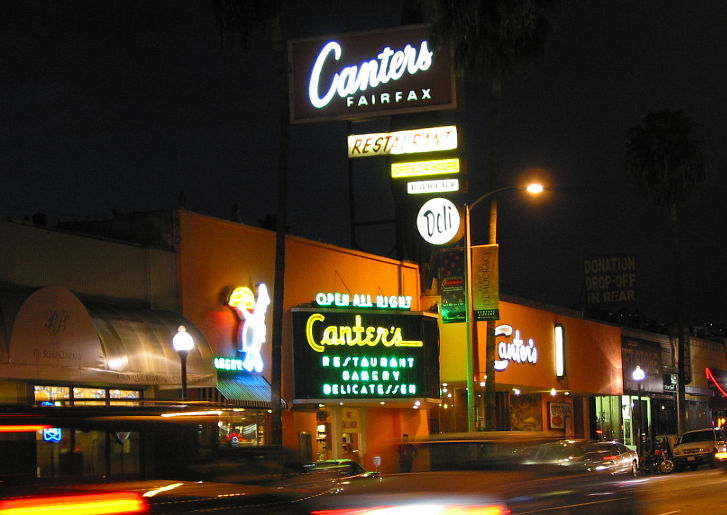
- Canter's Deli at night
- Interactive map of Canter's Deli

Restaurant information
- Established: 1931
- Food type: Delicatessen
- Location: 419 North Fairfax Avenue, Los Angeles, California, 90036, United States
- Website: Official website

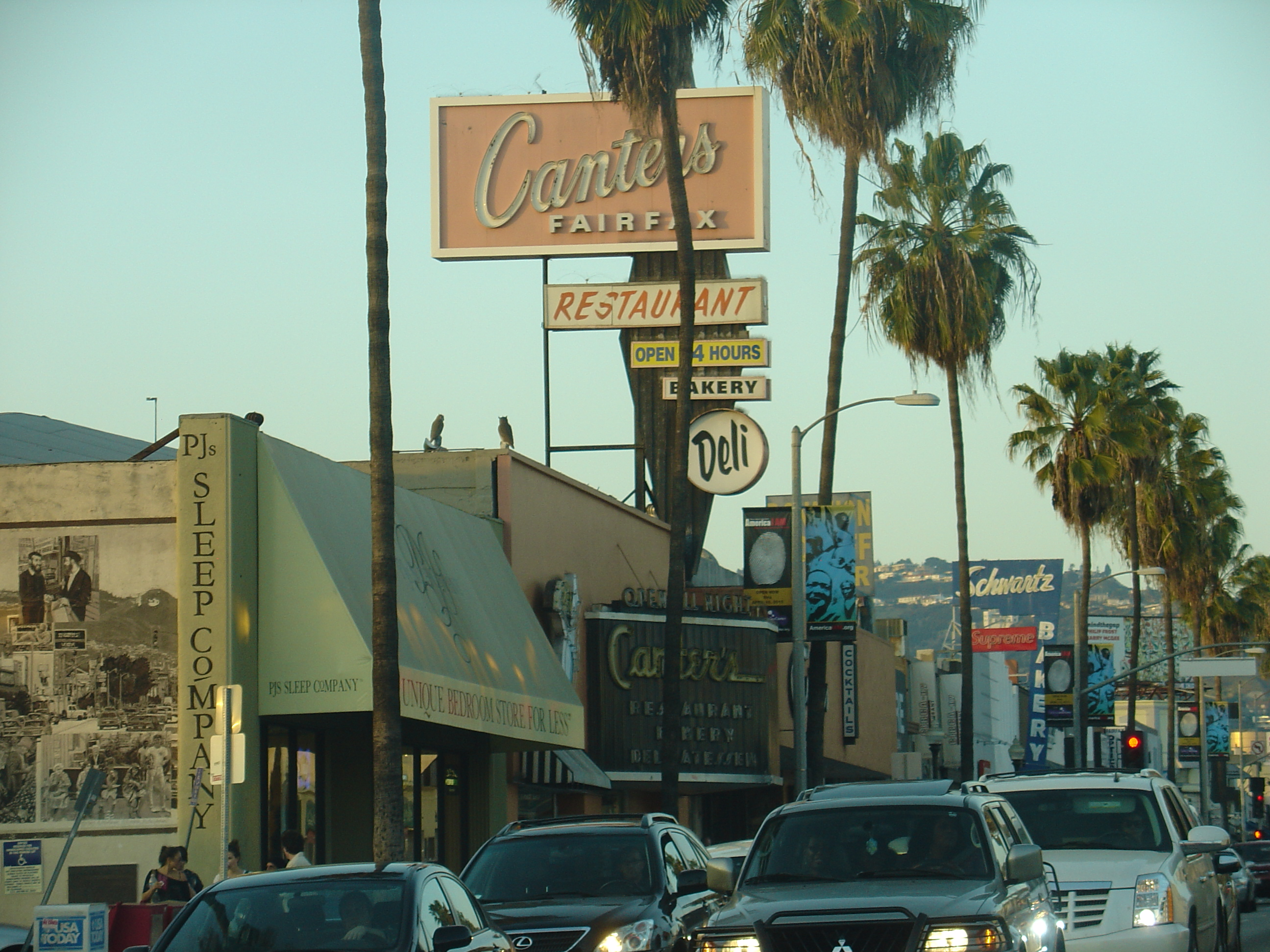
Canter's Deli on Fairfax Avenue in Los Angeles

Canter's Deli is a Jewish-style delicatessen, opened in 1931 in Boyle Heights, and later moved to the Fairfax District of Los Angeles, California, near the border of West Hollywood. It has been frequented by many movie stars and celebrities.

The restaurant serves traditional food items, including: lox and bagels, corned beef, matzoh ball soup, and challah bread. However, it is not certified kosher, being open on Saturdays and offering many non-kosher menu items like ham sandwiches. Canter's has remained open 24 hours most days, except on the Jewish holidays of Rosh Hashanah and Yom Kippur. However, its dining room is only open until 11:30 PM.

In 2021, the Financial Times ranked it as one of the "50 greatest food stores in the world."

== History ==
The Canter family originally opened a delicatessen in Jersey City, New Jersey, in 1924. They came west along with many Jews from the northeastern United States, and in 1931 they opened a delicatessen on Brooklyn Avenue in the Boyle Heights neighborhood, which at that time had a substantial Jewish population. After World War II, the Jewish population of Boyle Heights left en masse for the Fairfax District, West Hollywood, and other West Side neighborhoods (as well as the San Fernando Valley) and Canter's followed the influx of Jewish businesses west. A location at 439 North Fairfax Avenue opened in 1948; in 1953, the restaurant moved up the block into the former Esquire Theater (which had previously shown Yiddish-language films), resulting in a delicatessen much larger than its previous spaces. The restaurant was further expanded in 1959, and the Kibitz Room cocktail lounge opened in 1961. The Boyle Heights location remained in business until the 1970s.

Canter's quickly became a hang-out for show business personalities, given its location a block north of Television City and its 24/7 hours. It has remained such ever since. In the 1960s, Canter's became a late night hang-out for hippies, rock musicians, and other countercultural types, partially for the same reasons. Also, many rock musicians had grown up in Fairfax and West Hollywood, and the Sunset Strip was only a half-mile (0.8 km) away. Canter's has remained a favorite of rock musicians to the present day, and its bakery and deli counter are still open 24 hours. Canter's is open every day except for the Jewish holidays of Rosh Hashanah and Yom Kippur.

Canter's is known for its traditional deli favorites, such as pastrami, corned beef, matzah ball soup, challah, lox and bagels, and brisket. It also has a large menu of other breakfast, lunch, and dinner options and has been awarded for its food many times over the years. For example, Los Angeles Magazine named Canter's waffles the Best Waffle in Los Angeles. Esquire magazine called their Monte Cristo sandwich one of the best sandwiches in America.

The bar in Canter's, called the Kibitz Room, has its own history and has been a favorite of music personalities. Chuck E. Weiss. a regular at Canter's who has his name on a plaque at the booth where he would sit, wrote a song about the Kibitz Room called, "Rocking in the Kibitz Room". Although the restaurant is open 24 hours, the Kibitz Room closes at 2 am. They have live music every night, and were the launch pad for several bands, most notably the Wallflowers, Fiona Apple, and Rick Rubin's new project, the Vacation. The Big Jam has had plenty of "A List" musicians sit in, including Phil Everly, Jackson Browne, Melissa Etheridge, and Marc Canter's high school friend Slash. Marc Canter, currently the restaurant's co-owner, published a book in 2007 about the early days of Guns N' Roses. In 2019, Gina Canter and Alex Canter released a book titled Stories on Rye, cataloging a collection of memories shared at Canter's.

The restaurant has been featured in several movies and television shows, including HBO's Curb Your Enthusiasm in the episode "The Blind Date" (2004) and AMC's Mad Men in the episode "Time Zones" (2014). In 2007, Adam Stein, finalist on the FOX TV show On the Lot, filmed "Dough: The Musical" at Canter's. Canter's is also mentioned in the song, "Oh Daddy," by The Turtles.

In 1993, the restaurant was featured in Visiting... with Huell Howser Episode 125.

In 2003, Canter's opened an additional location inside Treasure Island Hotel and Casino in Las Vegas. It closed in December 2012.

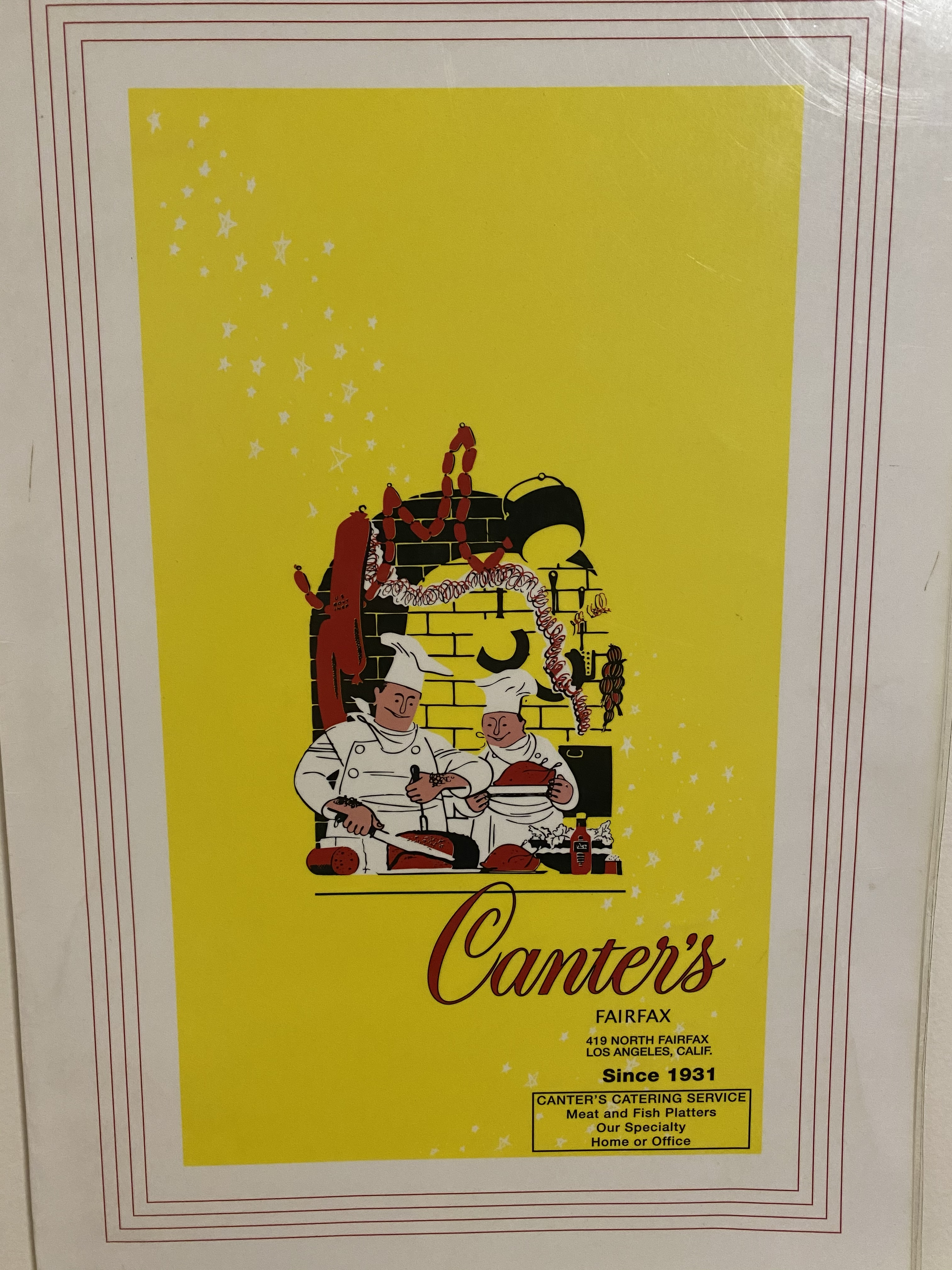
Early Canter's Menu

On 14 October 2008, Canter's celebrated their 60th anniversary on Fairfax. To mark the occasion, the deli reduced the price of their corned beef sandwich to its 1948 price of 60 cents, limited to one per customer, for a period of 12 hours.

In 2008, Canter's had opened another deli outlet at Dodger Stadium. The operation at the baseball park closed in 2011 and was replaced by Dodgertown Deli.

On July 24, 2014, Barack Obama surprised the lunchtime diners and staff when he visited Canter's.

On August 7, 2017, Canter's Restaurant was ordered closed for three days by the Los Angeles County Health Department for eleven health code violations, including a vermin infestation. Among other things, inspectors observed more than 10 cockroaches and 20 rodent droppings in the restaurant storage area, and 20 flies in the food preparation area. The additional health code violations cited that food contact surfaces were not clean and sanitized and the food was not in a safe, healthy condition.

After returning to the Las Vegas market in September 2017, the Canter's Tivoli Village location closed in July 2018. Opening in October 2017, the second Las Vegas location at the Linq Promenade closed in March 2019.

On May 30, 2020, at the start of the George Floyd Protests, Canter's neighborhood was the site of one of the first intense confrontations between protestors and police in Los Angeles. Canter's posted messages in support of Black Lives Matter and stayed open during the protests, giving out food and water to demonstrators.

On November 1, 2023, antisemitic graffiti was painted in the Canter's parking lot below a mural of photographs that document the history of the Jewish community in Los Angeles.

== Mural ==
The mural outside Canter's deli, next to the parking lot, was unveiled in 1985 and commemorates the history of the Jewish community in Los Angeles. It starts at the left end with historical images and progresses to the right in seven panels and includes scenes of Jewish participation in community life, institutions, businesses, significant cultural and historical events, as well as scenes from people's personal lives.

=== First Panel: the Beginnings, 1860s ===
- Wilshire Boulevard Temple, formerly known as Congregation B'nai B'rith, the first synagogue in Los Angeles.
- Abram Wolf Edelman, the first rabbi in Los Angeles.
- An early Jewish business in Los Angeles.
- The Newmarks, a prominent early L.A.-based Jewish family.

=== Second Panel: late 19th Century ===
- A Los Angeles street scene showing a Jewish business.
- Isaias W. Hellman, a prominent Los Angeles banker of the era.
- A Jewish family's barrel-making business.
- A home for tuberculosis patients that later evolved into what is now Cedars-Sinai Medical Center.
- Emil Harris, the first Jewish sheriff of Los Angeles.

=== Third Panel: early 20th Century ===
- Actors in a truck traveling to location for the filming of The Squaw Man, the first full-length movie made in Hollywood and by the Jesse Lasky Feature Play Company. The director, Cecil B. DeMille, is seated on the fender at left.
- Children receiving instruction in one of the first Hebrew schools in Los Angeles.
- The home of one of the first Jewish families to live in Boyle Heights.
- Al Jolson as a rabbi in The Jazz Singer.

=== Fourth Panel: 1930s ===
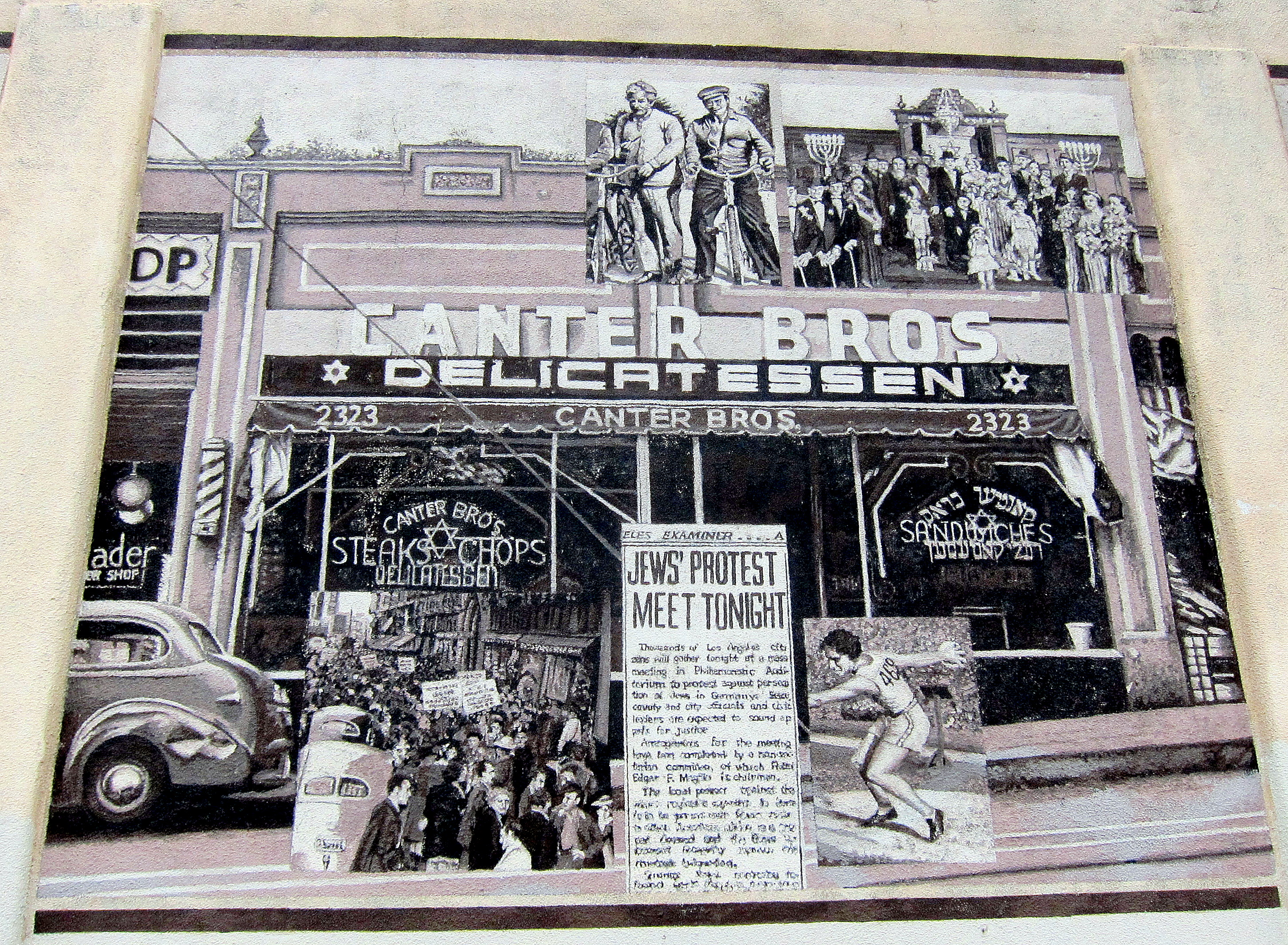

- Canter's original location in Boyle Heights.
- Albert Einstein and a local rabbi with their bicycles in Los Angeles.
- An elaborate Jewish wedding of the period.
- Garment worker's protest in downtown Los Angeles during the Garment workers' strike in 1933.
- A Los Angeles Examiner newspaper article describing a meeting of Jews to protest Adolf Hitler's activities in Europe.
- Lillian Copeland, gold medalist at the 1932 Summer Olympics held in Los Angeles.

=== Fifth Panel: 1940s ===
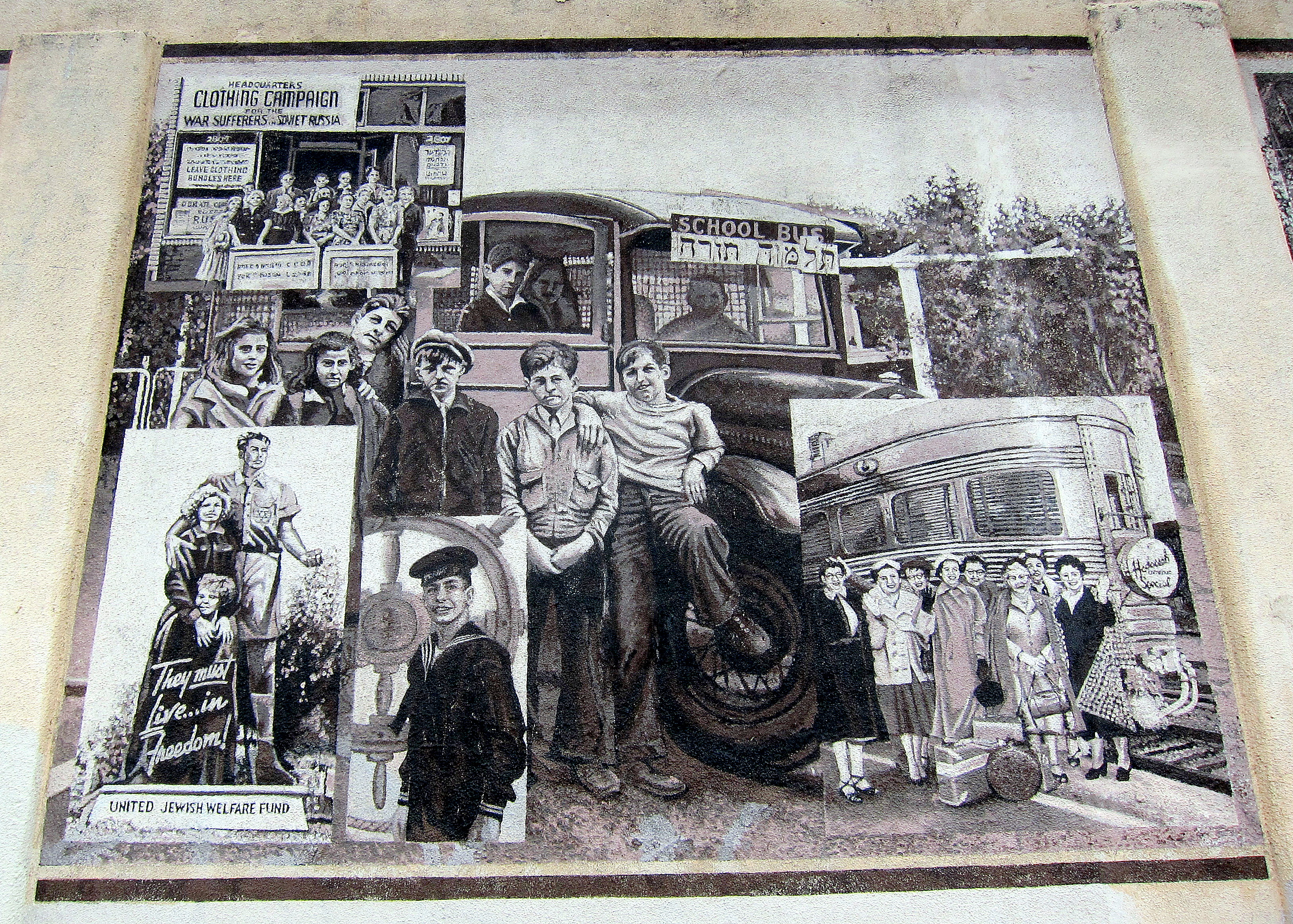

- A school bus and students at a Jewish school in Los Angeles.
- A Los Angeles women's group's Clothing Campaign to assist war sufferers in Europe.
- A cutout billboard by the United Jewish Welfare Fund on Wilshire Boulevard, proclaiming that Jews must live in freedom.
- The father of one of the organizers of the mural project, who served in the U.S. Navy during World War II.
- A group of Hadassah women boarding a train in L.A. to take them to a Hadassah conference in Sacramento, California.

=== Sixth Panel: 1960s ===
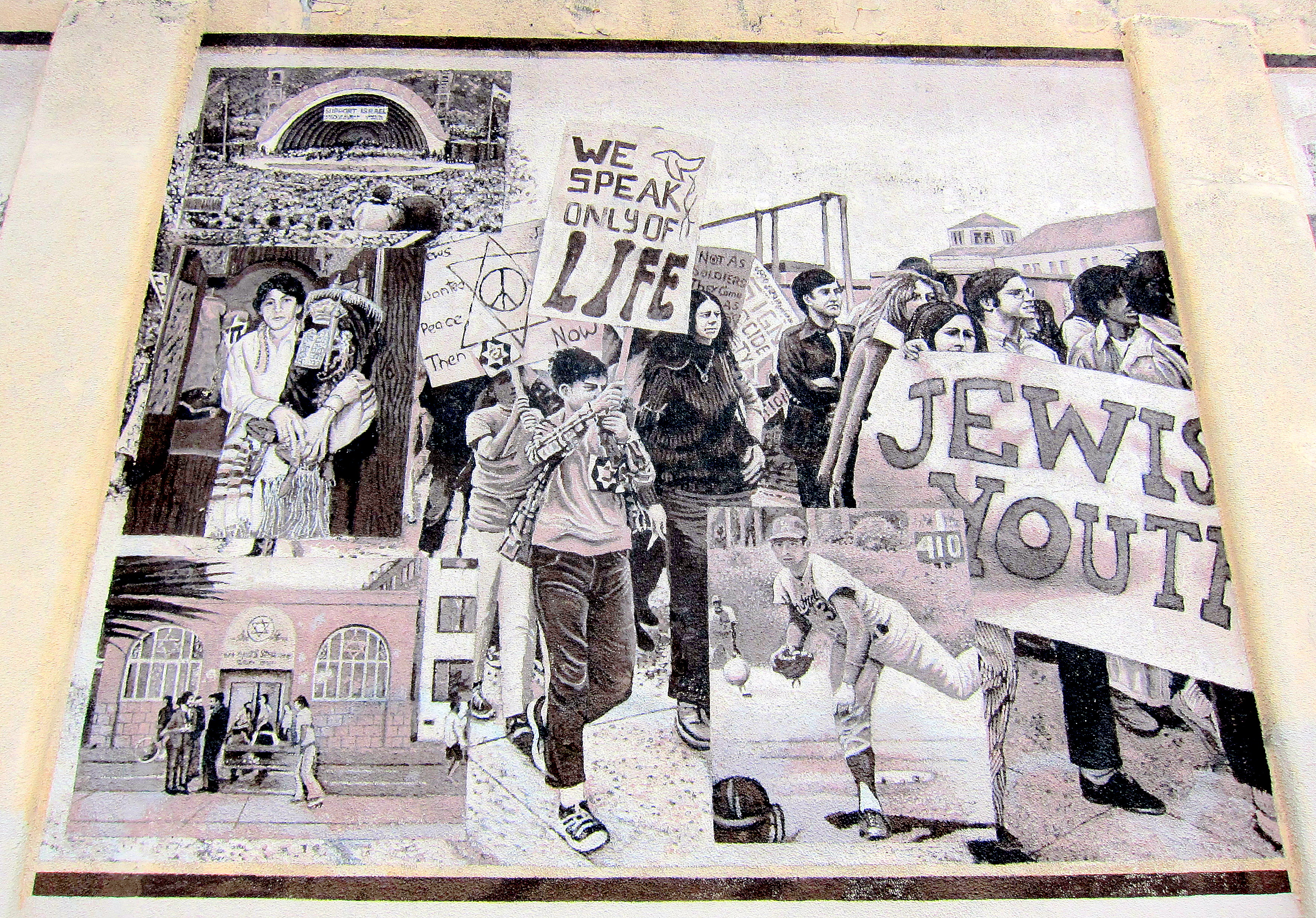

- A Jewish Youth group parading in front of nearby Fairfax High School affirming their support for the peace movement.
- A program in the Hollywood Bowl to raise money to help Israel during the Six Day War.
- The first female Jewish religious leader in Los Angeles.
- The Pacific Jewish Center (PJC), a synagogue on the beachfront in Venice, Los Angeles, at that time home to a large Jewish community.
- Sandy Koufax, Hall of Fame pitcher for the Los Angeles Dodgers.

=== Seventh Panel: Fairfax 1985 ===
- A view of Fairfax Avenue near the mural, looking north toward the Hollywood Hills.
- A view of the mural in progress, showing scaffolding and workers painting the mural.
- Two orthodox Jewish men shaking hands while shopping on Fairfax.
- Women selecting produce at a market on Fairfax.
- Local residents at a bus stop on Fairfax Avenue.

== See also ==
- List of Ashkenazi Jewish restaurants
- List of delicatessens
- Diamond Bakery
