= National Farmers Market Association =

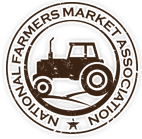
National Farmers Market Association

The National Farmers Market Association (NFMA) is a nationwide, nonprofit organization created to promote access to fresh food for people across all economic and social barriers, and to educate individuals, communities, food producers, and creative artisans about the impact that available and affordable fresh food can have on health and quality of life.

== Overview ==
While the NFMA promotes health and quality of life around farmers' markets, it does not seek to compete with grocery stores or supermarkets. The organization recognizes the inherent value of the farmer's market as a resource for making connections within a community, especially in areas of the country where grocery stores and supermarkets are absent.

The NFMA operates within a local area by recruiting volunteers to educate community members, connect people to farmers' markets, and help food desert communities learn how to get farmers' markets into their areas. Food deserts are areas where fresh, quality food is too far to reach or not affordable.

== History ==
The National Farmers Market Association was conceived as a program by a former Meals on Wheels executive director who saw in the communities his organization served a general lack of knowledge about nutrition and the benefits of fresh fruits and vegetables. The group he created that began the NFMA also saw how farmers' markets became a center for people not just to shop, but to connect with each other, for public service organizations to conduct outreach, and for artists and musicians to express their talent and be seen.

== Community benefits of the NFMA ==
An NFMA chapter aims to support local farmers by facilitating direct sales of their products to consumers. Additionally, NFMA chapters within local neighborhoods, is seen by some as a potential means to enhance buying power and promote education in the local area, fostering a connection between local farmers and their communities. By purchasing from an NFMA farmers' market, money may circulate within the local economy instead of being sent to growers worldwide.

== See also ==
- Food desert
- Farmers market
- Community-supported agriculture
- Fresh foods
- Farmers Market (Los Angeles)
- Public market
- Street food
- Street market
- Wet market
- Farmers
