= Susan Rasky =

American journalist

- Born: June 10, 1952; Hollywood, California
- Died: December 29, 2013 (aged 61); El Cerrito, California
- Education: B.A. History, University of California, Berkeley, M.A. Economic History, London School of Economics
- Occupations: Political reporter for The New York Times, senior lecturer at the UC Berkeley School of Journalism
- Writing career
- Language: English
- Genre: Political journalism
- Subject: American politics
- Notable awards: George Polk Award

Susan Rasky (June 10, 1952 – December 29, 2013) was an American university educator and political journalist for the New York Times. She won the George Polk Award for her coverage of Capitol Hill in 1991.

== Early life and education ==
Susan Rasky was born in 1952 in Hollywood, California to Jewish, liberal parents. She was raised in Baldwin Hills, Los Angeles and attended high school in the Fairfax District.

Rasky received her bachelor's degree in history from the University of California, Berkeley in 1974, and later earned her master's degree in economic history from the London School of Economics.

== Career ==
Rasky moved to Washington, D.C. to pursue a career in journalism. She covered economic policy for Reuters and the Bureau of National Affairs for five years. In 1984, Rasky was hired as an editor by The New York Times. The Times eventually named Rasky as its congressional correspondent. She continued to write for Reuters, and was hired as a columnist and contributing editor for The California Journal.

In 1991, Rasky was a joint recipient of a George Polk Award for her coverage of the budget debates in 1990. Rasky shared the honor with David Rosenbaum. She also wrote for publications including The Los Angeles Times, National Public Radio, The Sacramento Bee and Salon.

In 1992, Rasky joined the Berkeley's Graduate School of Journalism faculty teaching political journalism as a senior lecturer. Her students reportedly referred to themselves as "Raskyites" and "Raskyfarians".
