= David Rosenbaum (journalist) =

American journalist (1942–2006)

David E. Rosenbaum
- Born: March 1, 1942; Miami, Florida
- Died: January 8, 2006 (aged 63); Washington, D.C.
- Education: Columbia University master's degree in journalism 1965
- Alma mater: Dartmouth College bachelor's degree 1963
- Occupation: journalist
- Years active: 1968–2005
- Employer: The New York Times
- Known for: The New York Times feature "The Fine Print", in which he exposed hidden, perplexing or hypocritical aspects of recent or pending legislation
- Spouse: Virginia K. Rosenbaum

David Eugene Rosenbaum (March 1, 1942 – January 8, 2006) was an American journalist, particularly known for his coverage of politics—in Washington, D.C., and nationally—for The New York Times.

His death led to nationally noted reforms of the emergency services in Washington, D.C.

== Origins, education and early career ==
Rosenbaum was a native of Miami, Florida, and grew up in Tampa, Florida, where his father developed a citrus cannery.

In 1963, Rosenbaum earned his bachelor's degree from Dartmouth College (where he was a member of the Kappa Kappa Kappa local fraternity), and in 1965, a master's degree in journalism from Columbia University.

After his education, Rosenbaum worked for a number of publications including the St. Petersburg Times, a string of suburban newspapers in London, England, and the Congressional Quarterly, before moving to The New York Times.

== Career at The New York Times ==
Rosenbaum worked for The New York Times for 35 years, beginning in 1968. Throughout his career, he worked as the editor or chief correspondent for many departments at the newspaper, including Congressional, domestic policy, economics, and business. He also worked as assistant news editor for the newspaper.

Except for his three years as a Times special-projects editor in the 1980s, most of Rosenbaum's Times career was spent in the Times' Washington Bureau. Rosenbaum covered the 1970s Senate Watergate hearings, the 1980s Iran–Contra affair, the restructuring of Medicare and Social Security, and various budget and tax debates between Congress and the White House.

Rosenbaum was particularly known for distilling complex governmental issues into readily understood analyses of their effects on people's lives. His popular feature, "The Fine Print", dissected pending policies and legislation, revealing hidden, perplexing or hypocritical facts about current bills and new laws.

Rosenbaum also covered national politics. In 1996, 2000, and 2004, he directed Times coverage of the New Hampshire presidential primaries, and covered the 2004 general election campaign.

Though he retired in late 2005, Rosenbaum kept his desk at the Times Washington Bureau, and planned continuing as a contributing writer. Just before his death in early 2006, he was working on a preliminary Times obituary of former President Gerald Ford.

In 1991, Rosenbaum was a co-recipient of the Polk Award for his coverage of the 1990 tax hike by then President George H. W. Bush—sharing the honor with journalist Susan Rasky.

In 2012, six years after Rosenbaum's death, his byline appeared on the Times obituary for recently deceased 1968 Democratic Presidential nominee George McGovern—whom Rosenbaum had covered in earlier years. Rosenbaum had been tasked to write McGovern's obituary years earlier, in accordance with the Times practice of preparing and storing obituaries for notable people while they are still alive.

== Leadership and teaching ==
For 25 years, Rosenbaum served on the steering committee of The Reporters Committee for Freedom of the Press

Rosenbaum mentored younger reporters, and taught at his alma mater, Dartmouth College, at Stanford University, and at other colleges and universities.

== Death and aftermath ==
Rosenbaum's 2006 death, under dramatic circumstances, led to reforms in the troubled emergency services system of the District of Columbia, and brought attention to related public safety issues nationwide.

=== Death ===
Less than a month after his retirement, Rosenbaum died on January 8, 2006, from a brain injury caused by a blow to the head during a robbery on January 6, near his Washington, D.C. home while out for a walk. Emergency services personnel mistakenly thought him intoxicated, and delayed his treatment, and emergency room staff at Howard University Hospital ignored him for hours—factors alleged to contribute to his death.

=== Criminal case ===
After store surveillance cameras revealed they had used Rosenbaum's credit cards, cousins Michael C. Hamlin and Percey Jordan, Jr. turned themselves into authorities and confessed to the robbery. Hamlin agreed to testify against Jordan, accusing him of killing Rosenbaum with a heavy plastic pipe. At trial, Jordan was convicted of first-degree murder and sentenced to 65 years in prison. Hamlin plead guilty to second-degree murder and was sentenced to 26 years in prison. An appeals court upheld Jordan's conviction in 2011.

=== System reform settlement ===
Rosenbaum's family—including his widow, Virginia (a prominent corporate governance analyst, for many years lead analyst for Washington's Investor Responsibility Research Center), brother, Marcus (a senior editor at NPR in Washington), son, Daniel (a photographer for The Washington Times), daughter, Dottie, and son-in-law, Toby—charged Washington's emergency services system with contributing to Rosenbaum’s death. An investigation validated their concerns.

The D.C. inspector general's "scathing", high-profile, public report described the circumstances of Rosenbaum's death as "an unacceptable chain of failure", blaming delayed or inappropriate responses by firefighters, paramedics, police officers and hospital staff—and citing systemic and cultural failures that plagued the District's emergency services system. The report led to a public apology by the City's Fire and EMS Chief, and drew national attention to the issues raised about emergency services nationwide.

Rosenbaum's family agreed to forgo a suit against the city in exchange for the creation of a task force to investigate and improve Washington's emergency services. In cooperation with incoming Washington mayor Adrian Fenty (who had conferred with Rosenbaum's survivors before his election), the Rosenbaum family's settlement with authorities, signed in March, 2007, produced the Task Force on Emergency Medical Services (often called the "Rosenbaum EMS task force"). The task force produced numerous recommendations for emergency services reform in Washington, D.C.

Reforms followed. By the start of 2008, the District of Columbia got a new fire chief and a full-time medical director, began electronic tracking of patient interactions, and enhanced its oversight of emergency services.

However, in 2009, many issues remained unresolved, and the Rosenbaum task force remained active.

=== Family aftermath ===
Rosenbaum's widow, Virginia ("Ginny") Rosenbaum—his wife for 39 years—died of cancer June 22, 2006, only five months after her husband.

Rosenbaum’s son-in-law, Toby Halliday, served as a member of the Rosenbaum EMS task force.

In 2007, Washington's pre-eminent local magazine, Washingtonian, named Rosenbaum's family "Washingtonians of the Year 2007" for their decision to forgo a $20 million lawsuit against the city, over Rosenbaum's death, in exchange for Washington's reform of its emergency services.

== Honors and awards ==
- 1991: Polk Award (co-recipient) for coverage of the 1990 tax hike by then President George H. W. Bush. Shared with journalist Susan Rasky.
- Posthumous: David E. Rosenbaum Reporting Internship in Washington, D.C., sponsored by The New York Times.
