= Commercial Tenant Protection Act =

2024 California law protecting small commercial tenants

The Commercial Tenant Protection Act (SB 1103) is a California law, enacted in 2024 and effective January 1, 2025, that extends a set of consumer-style protections to small commercial tenants. It was the first state law in the United States to create a distinct category of protected "qualified commercial tenants" and apply rent-notice, lease-translation, and operating-cost transparency rules to commercial leases.

== Background ==
Commercial leases in California had historically been treated as arm's-length agreements between sophisticated parties, with few of the statutory protections afforded residential tenants. Advocates argued that the smallest businesses and nonprofits — which often lease space without legal representation — faced displacement from sharp rent increases and from opaque "common area maintenance" (CAM) or building-operating-cost charges they could not verify.

== Legislative history ==
SB 1103 was introduced by state senator Caroline Menjivar (D–San Fernando Valley). It passed the Legislature in 2024 and was signed by Governor Gavin Newsom on September 30, 2024, taking effect January 1, 2025. The law added Section 1950.9 to the California Civil Code and amended provisions governing rent-increase notice and lease translation.

== Provisions ==
The Act applies to a "qualified commercial tenant," defined as a microenterprise (generally five or fewer employees), a restaurant with fewer than 10 employees, or a nonprofit organization with fewer than 20 employees, that has provided the landlord with required self-certification.

Key requirements include:

- Building operating costs / CAM. A landlord may not pass building operating costs through to a qualified commercial tenant unless the costs are allocated proportionately and supported by documentation; on written request the landlord must provide itemized documentation and a signed attestation within 30 days, and may not change the allocation method to the tenant's detriment without notice.
- Rent-increase notice. For month-to-month or shorter tenancies, a landlord must give at least 90 days' written notice of a rent increase greater than 10 percent, and at least 30 days' notice for smaller increases.
- Lease translation. If a lease is negotiated primarily in Spanish, Chinese, Tagalog, Vietnamese, or Korean, the landlord must provide a translation in that language.
- Termination of unspecified-term tenancies. The law sets notice requirements for ending tenancies of unspecified duration.

== Enforcement and remedies ==
A qualified commercial tenant may raise a landlord's violation as an affirmative defense to an unlawful detainer action based on nonpayment of operating costs. A landlord who violates the operating-cost provisions may be liable for actual damages and, in the court's discretion, attorney's fees; where the landlord acted willfully or with "oppression, fraud, or malice," the tenant may recover treble and punitive damages.

== Reception ==
Supporters, including the bill's author and small-business advocacy groups such as Inclusive Action for the City, Public Counsel, and Bet Tzedek, described the law as a transparency and anti-displacement measure for the state's smallest businesses. Landlord and industry groups opposed it: the California Business Properties Association called the mandates "disastrous" for small businesses, and the Apartment Association of Greater Los Angeles characterized it as "another nanny state piece of legislation." Legal commentators noted that the Act shifts costs and compliance burdens to landlords and contains ambiguities likely to be resolved through later legislation or litigation.
