= Dependent adult =

Non-senior citizens (18-64) who require assistance in their day-to-day lives

Dependent adults are adults who are not senior citizens but who need assistance in their day-to-day life. Activities that require assistance include normal activities including but not limited to showering or getting out of bed. Dependent adults have special rights and protections from abuse. After the age of 64, a person who might otherwise be considered a dependent adult is afforded other rights and protections as a senior citizen or elder. Laws regulating dependent adult abuse are very similar or identical to those governing elder abuse.

The definition is similar from state to state. California Welfare and Institutions Code Section 15610.23 defines a dependent adult as:

(a) 'Dependent adult' means any person between the ages of 18 and 64 years who resides in this state and who has physical or mental limitations that restrict his or her ability to carry out normal activities or to protect his or her rights, including, but not limited to, persons who have physical or developmental disabilities, or whose physical or developmental abilities have diminished because of age. (b) 'Dependent adult' includes any person between the ages of 18 and 64 years who is admitted as an inpatient to a 24-hour facility, as defined in Sections 1250, 1250.2, and 1250.3 of the Health and Safety Code.

The state of California gives two primary protections to dependent adults which include:

1. Any physical, emotional, or sexual abuse – including trauma inflicted by negligent conduct – can constitute a violation of California laws protecting the elderly and those with disabilities. Those found to have inflicted abuse upon an elder or disabled person not only face possible civil and criminal penalties, but the victim of the abuse can also seek to recover damages inflicted upon them, including the pain and suffering they have experienced.

2. Dependent adults are protected from unexpected transfers of property or assets to individuals who might exert undue influence over them. This includes caregivers, those who marry them, and individuals responsible for drafting or transcribing a will, trust, or similar "instrument" of estate transfer.
