= Beverly Fairfax Historic District =

Neighborhood in Los Angeles, California, United States

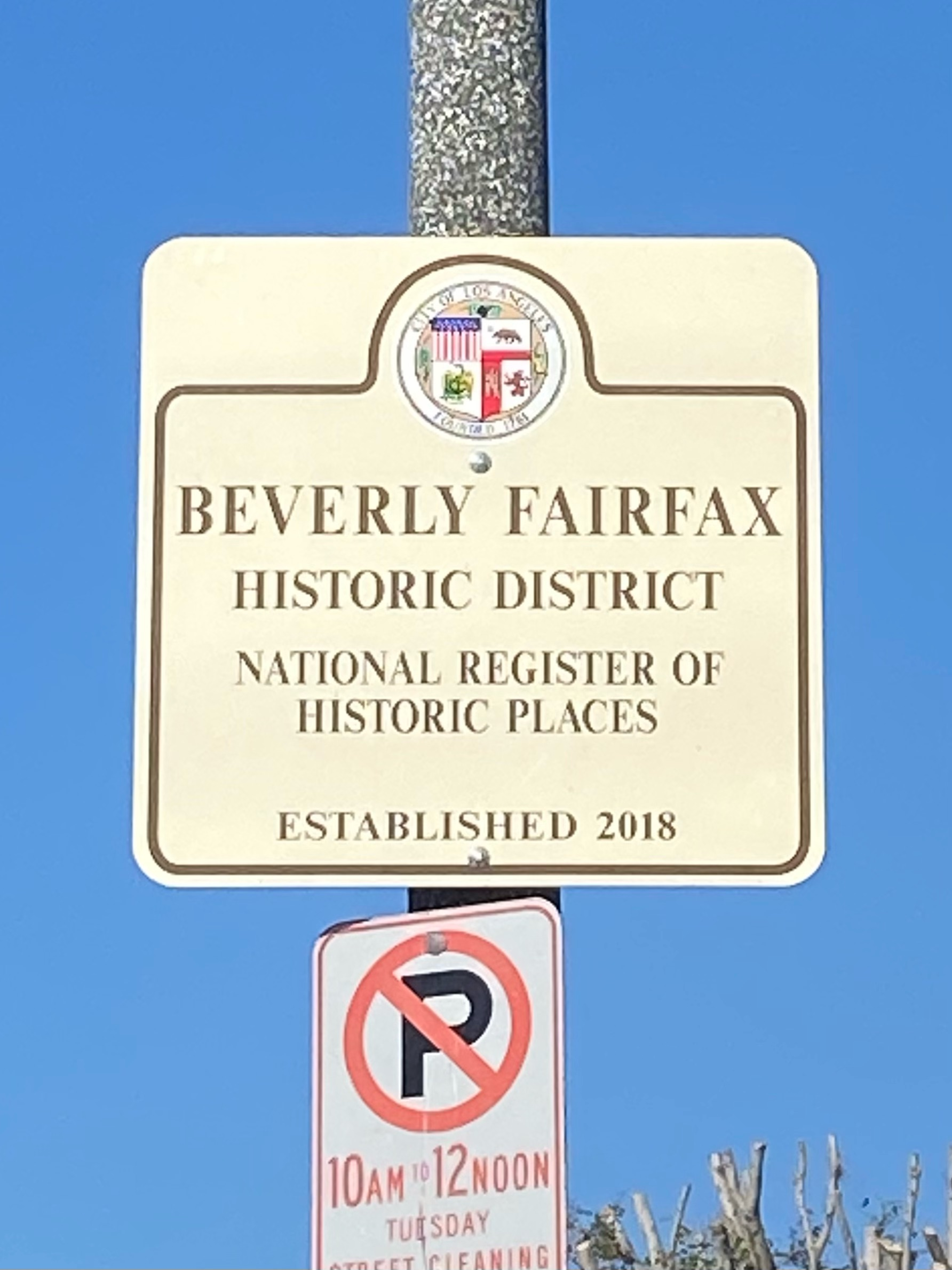
Beverly Fairfax Historic District sign from the National Register of Historic Places

Beverly Fairfax Historic District is a neighborhood in the Fairfax District of Los Angeles that is noted for its significance to the city's Jewish history and for the area's preserved period revival architecture. The district's boundaries are Rosewood Avenue, Melrose Avenue, N Gardner Street, Vista Street, Beverly Boulevard, and N Fairfax Avenue. The district was officially recognized by the National Register of Historic Places on October 4, 2018. Efforts to recognize Beverly Fairfax as a historical district were led by Save Beverly Fairfax, a grassroots coalition of owners and residents formed in 2016 to protect the neighborhood's architectural and cultural history.

The buildings in the Beverly Fairfax district were majorly developed between 1924 and 1949. The neighborhood's architectural styles include Spanish Colonial Revival, Mission Revival, Chateauesque, Streamline Moderne, Mediterranean Revival, Tudor Revival, Minimal Traditional, and Art Deco. Out of 463 residences, 79% of the district's buildings contribute to its historical significance.

By 1940, the neighborhood had one of the highest concentrations of Jewish residents in Los Angeles, with over two-thirds of the district's population being Jewish. Jewish schools, religious institutions, social clubs, and storefronts flourished here in the 20th century. Following World War II, many Holocaust survivors moved to Beverly Fairfax because it was an established safe haven for Jewish people living in Los Angeles.

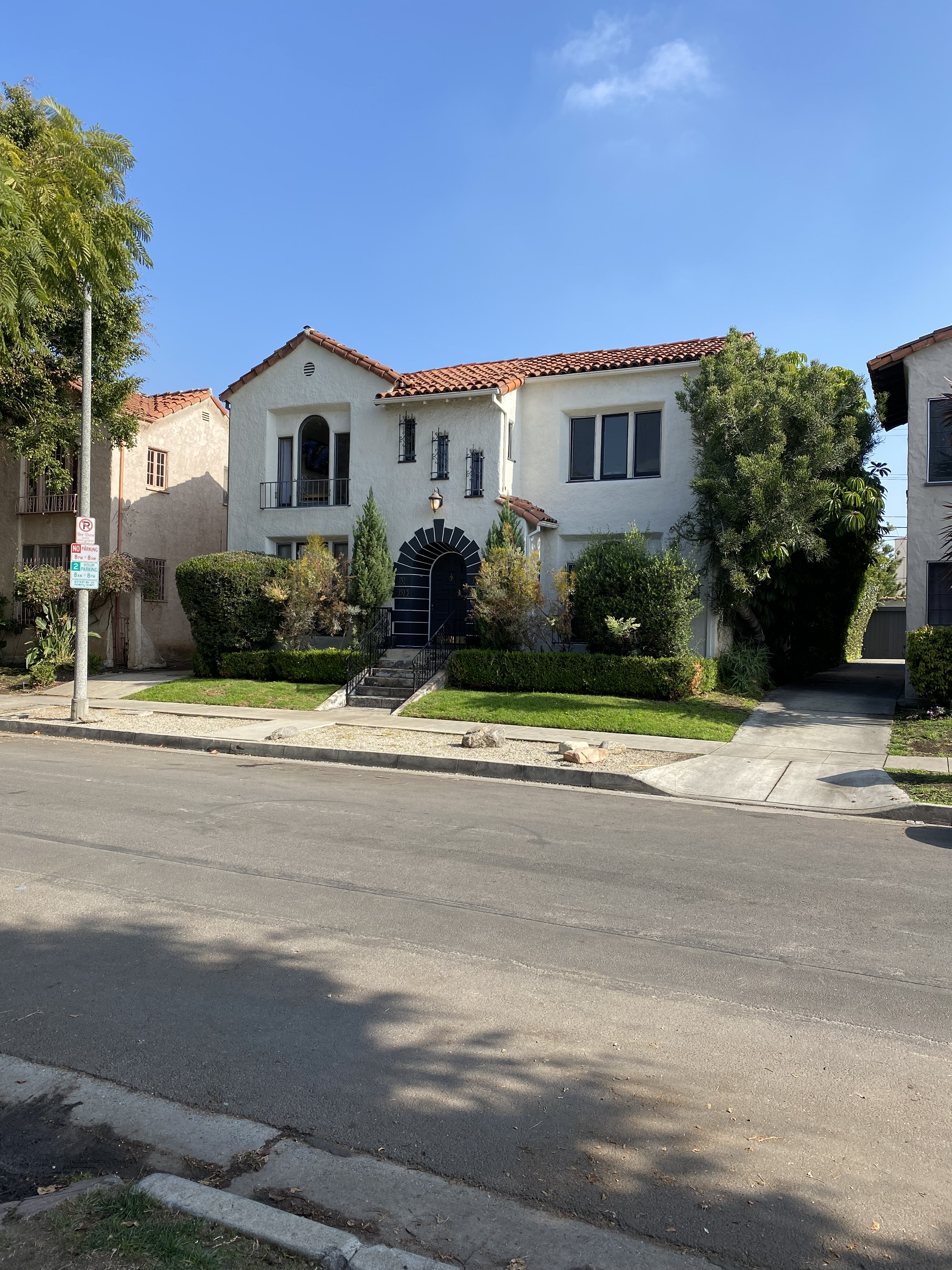
One residence found in Beverly Fairfax Historic District, constructed in the Spanish Colonial Revival style

In 2016, several major development projects near the district threatened the neighborhood's unique cultural and architectural heritage. In response, Save Beverly Fairfax hired Architectural Resources Group to complete a district survey and draft the National Register nomination for the Beverly Fairfax neighborhood. The nomination was submitted to the National Register on May 30, 2018, and was officially recognized on October 4, 2018. Save Beverly Fairfax was awarded with the Governor's Historic Preservation Award and the LA Conservancy Preservation Award in 2019 for achieving the Historic District recognition for Beverly Fairfax.
