= Fairfax Avenue =

Street in the city of Los Angeles, California

Coordinates: 34.0763°N 118.3615°W

Map

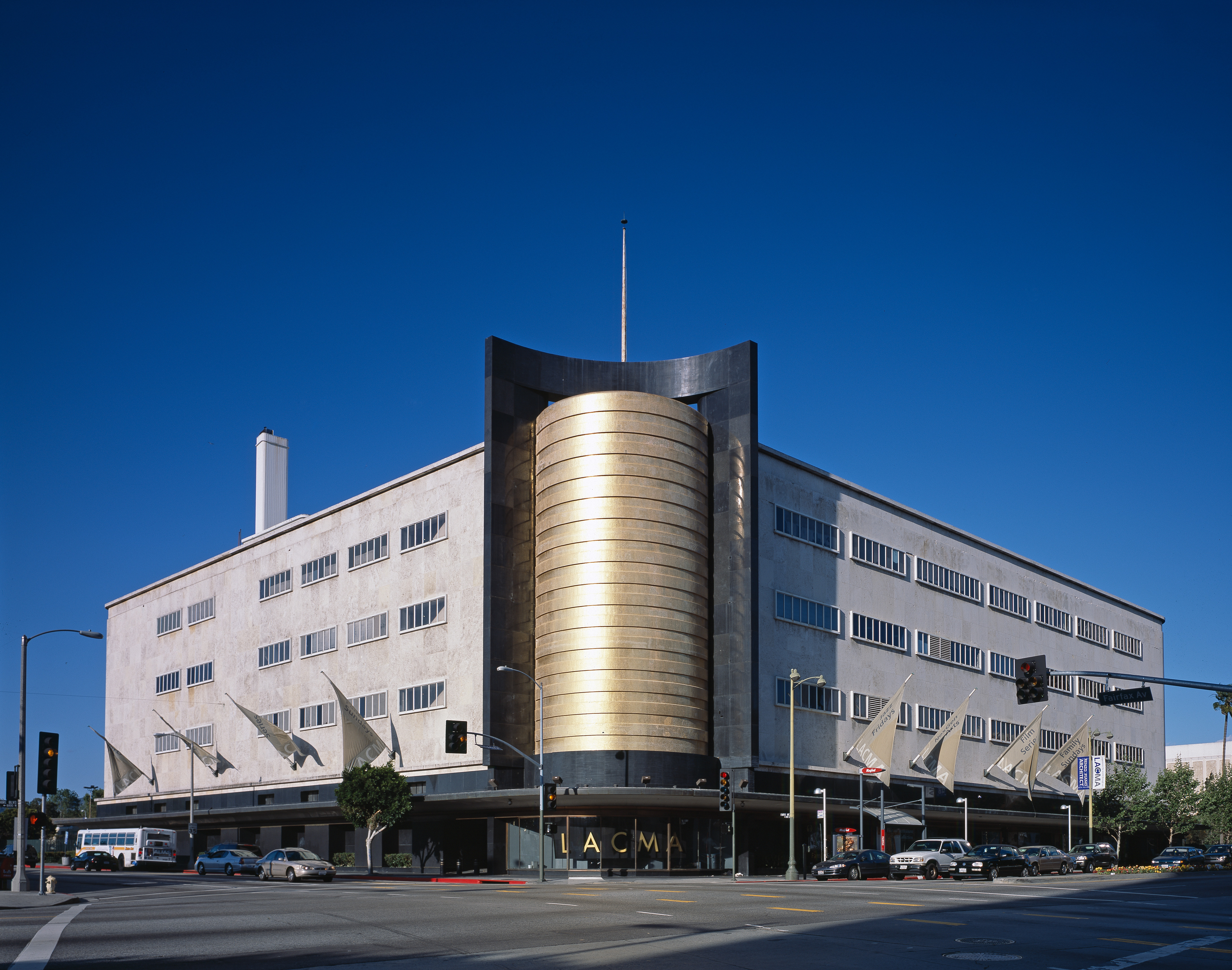
The Academy Museum of Motion Pictures and the May Company on Fairfax Avenue

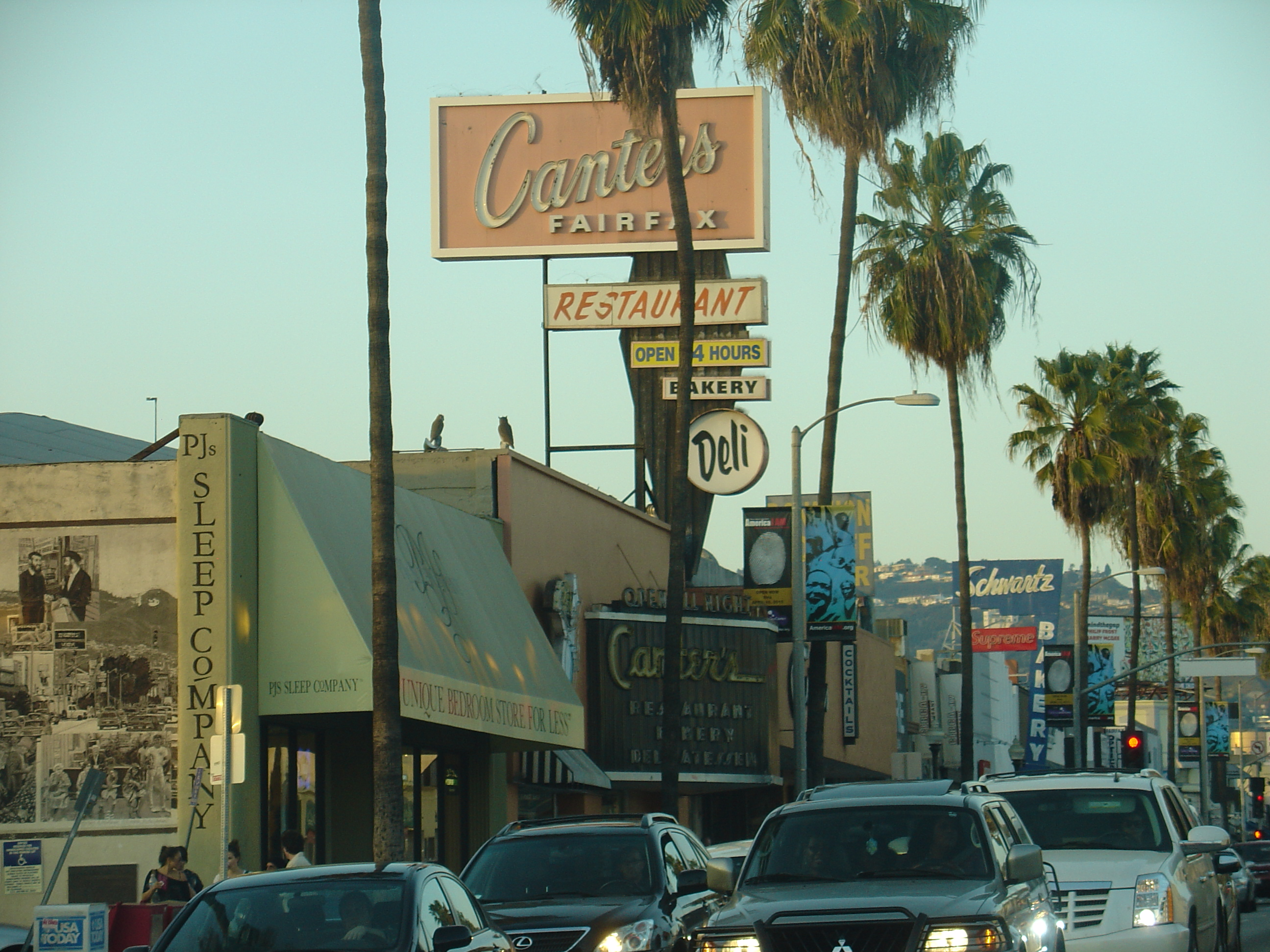
Canter's Deli on Fairfax Avenue

Fairfax Avenue is a prominent north-south thoroughfare in the City of Los Angeles.

== Route ==
At its southern end, Fairfax begins by branching off from La Cienega Boulevard just north of Jefferson Boulevard in Los Angeles.

Heading north, Little Ethiopia is located between Whitworth Drive and Olympic Boulevard. Continuing north, the Petersen Automotive Museum is located on the southeast corner of Wilshire Boulevard and Fairfax. At the northeast corner of Wilshire and Fairfax is the former May Company department store building, present-day home of the Academy Museum of Motion Pictures. At Sixth Street, Fairfax Avenue forms the western boundary of Park La Brea, a 160-acre (60 ha), 4,222-unit apartment complex with over 10,000 residents. The Grove is at 3rd Street and Fairfax. CBS's Television City is located on the corner of Fairfax and Beverly Boulevard. Canter's Deli, a late night hangout since the 1940s, is located between Beverly and Melrose.

At its northern end, Fairfax terminates at Hollywood Boulevard in Hollywood.

== Transportation ==
Metro Local line 217 serves Fairfax Avenue. An underground station for the Metro D Line is located at Wilshire Boulevard.

== Notable landmarks ==
- Canter's
- CBS Television City
- Farmers Market
- Academy Museum of Motion Pictures
- Petersen Automotive Museum
- Golf Wang
- Supreme
