= Jim Brady (journalist) =

American journalist and entrepreneur

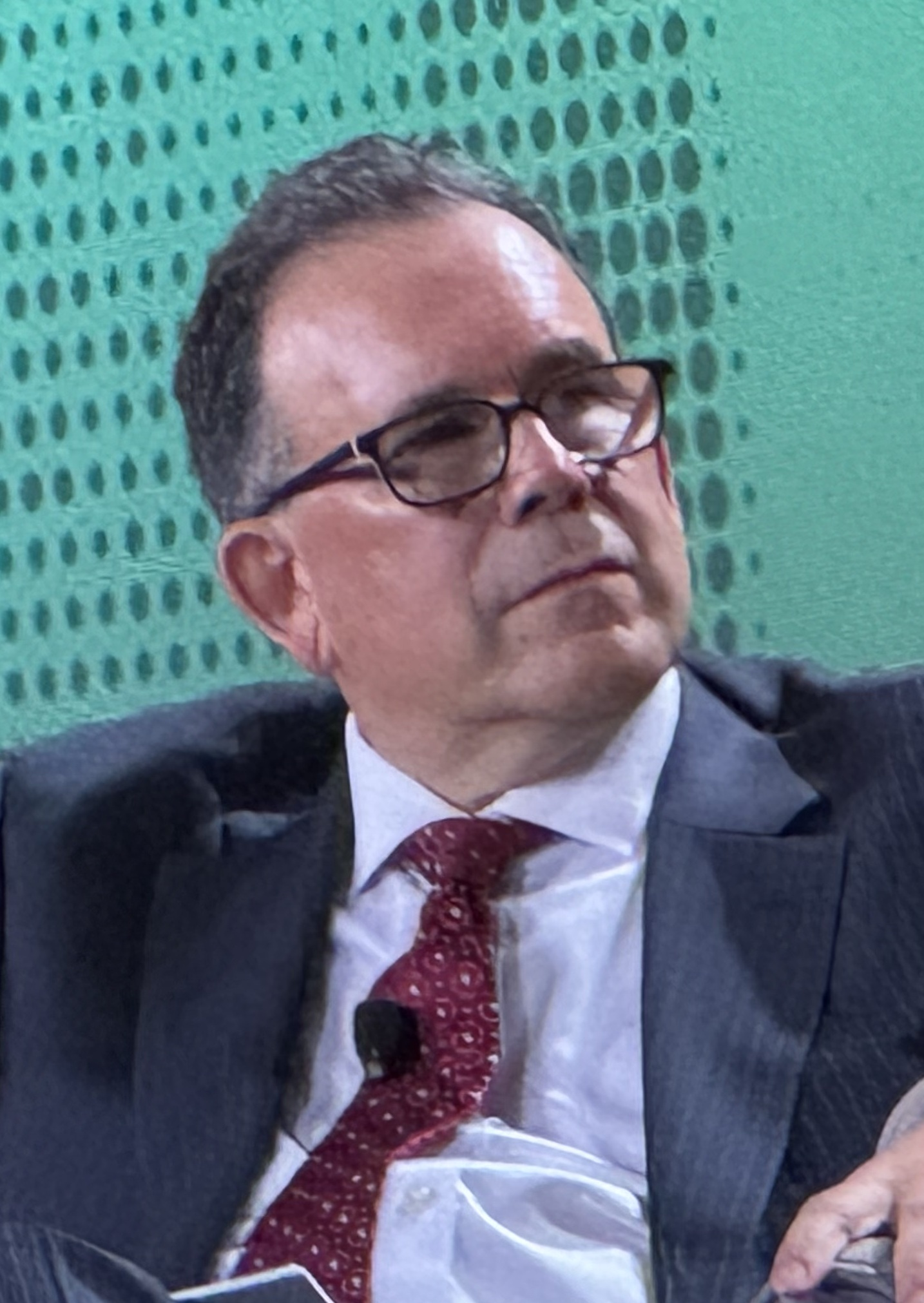
- Brady at the 2025 Knight Media Forum
- Education: American University (BA)
- Occupations: Journalist, entrepreneur
- Years active: 1987–present
- Employer: Knight Foundation

Jim Brady is an American journalist and entrepreneur. He has worked at The Washington Post, AOL, and ESPN, among other newsrooms, and led digital journalism initiatives at Allbritton Communications, Digital First Media, and Spirited Media. In 2021, he became the vice president for journalism at the Knight Foundation where he has since overseen large investments in diverse and local bodies of journalism throughout the United States.

A graduate of American University, Brady received the Alumni Achievement Award in 2010. In 2017, Brady received the Rich Jaroslovsky Founder Award for his work and innovation in the field of digital media.

== Early life and education ==
Brady grew up in Long Island and graduated from American University in 1989 with a degree in print journalism. During his time in college, he worked part-time and The Washington Post and The Eagle.

== Career ==
Early in his career, Brady served as an executive editor for The Washington Post (from 1987–1999 and 2004–2009) and AOL (from 1999–2003) before deciding to pursue online news. Starting in 2009, he joined Allbritton Communications as the president of digital strategy and was briefly a consulting editor for The Guardian. In August 2010, Brady launched TBD.com, a website for online news reporting.

Later, at Digital First Media, Brady served as editor-in-chief starting in 2011 and oversaw hundreds of news entities ranging from newspapers to online sites. He was also deeply involved in Project Thunderdome, an initiative at Digital First Media to better coordinate the organization's news properties. Brady then left Digital First Media in April 2014 due to Project Thunderdome ceasing operations.

Afterward, by the summer of 2014, Brady launched and became the CEO of Stomping Ground, a local online news platform based in Philadelphia, and also taught journalism at Temple University. From 2015 to 2018, Brady then served as a public editor for ESPN. Additionally, from 2014 to 2021, Brady was the CEO of Spirited Media, a news consulting firm where he developed three local news sites: Philadelphia's Billy Penn, Pittsburgh's The Incline, and Denver's Denverite. In 2019, he sold all three local news sites.

Brady was a former president of the Online News Association. He has consulted for various organizations like WBEZ, Politico, The Philadelphia Inquirer, and NBC, among others. He has also judged the Pulitzer Prizes twice and served on the boards of the News Media Alliance, the International Women's Media Foundation, the National Press Foundation, the Local Media Association, the American Society of News Editors, and the American Press Institute.

=== Knight Foundation ===
On August 30, 2021, Brady joined the John S. and James L. Knight Foundation as its newest vice president for journalism. At the Knight Foundation, he has overseen the organization's investments in news organizations—specifically black-owned newsrooms, startups based in marginalized communities, and otherwise institutions rooted in diverse perspectives in reporting—with an emphasis on promoting an "effective democracy" and "informed citizenry." He has also led the organization's newsletter, News @ Knight.

In 2022, Brady announced a $1.2 million grant to be disbursed, over three years, to The Signals Network, a nonprofit which supports whistleblowers. In 2023, Brady announced a $5 million investment in Singal Akron, a nonprofit news organization based in northeastern Ohio as part of the broader Signal Ohio initiative. In December 2024, Brady announced a "significant investment" in Report for America. In January 2025, Brady announced a collaborative partnership between the Knight Foundation and the Associated Press in order to "strengthen local news ecosystems at a time when reliable information is harder to find than ever." The same month, he announced a grant disbursement to support local reporters to Connecticut and Puerto Rico.
