= Gene Foreman (journalist) =

American journalist

Gene Clemons Foreman (born November 20, 1934) is an American journalist who managed the newsroom of The Philadelphia Inquirer from 1973 to 1998. Foreman is best known as the managing editor who teamed with The Inquirer’s executive editor, Gene Roberts, during The Inquirer's "Golden Age." In the 18 years they led the news staff, the paper won 17 Pulitzer Prizes, triumphed in an economic battle for survival over The Evening Bulletin, and became an influential regional paper.

== Early life and early career ==
Foreman was born in Fremont, Ohio, the second of six children of Clemons Walter Foreman and Louise Vogel Foreman. He grew up in Wabash, Phillips County, Arkansas, where his family had bought a farm. By age 9 he was drawing newspaper front pages on his school notepad, and at 10 he and a schoolmate produced a five-day-a-week community paper.

When Foreman won a county spelling bee in 1948, it was his good luck to be interviewed by Clarence Taylor, editor of the weekly Phillips County Herald. Taylor, who would write that Foreman spelled “with the confidence of a politician without opposition,” asked what the eighth grader wanted to be when he grew up. Foreman answered: “I want your job.” The kind editor responded by giving him a nonpaying job writing social notes from his community in Wabash. That led in 1949 to a summer job at the daily Helena World, where he was an apprentice reporter, a proofreader, and the paper’s sports editor.

As a high school senior, Foreman entered six Journalism Day contests at Arkansas State College (now Arkansas State University), winning four. His performance was the best in the program’s 17-year history and earned Foreman a college scholarship and a work-study job. While an Arkansas State student, Foreman had summer internships at the Memphis Press-Scimitar in 1953 and the Arkansas Gazette in Little Rock in 1954 and 1955. When he graduated from Arkansas State in 1956 with a degree in journalism, the Gazette hired him as a full-time reporter.

Foreman received an Army commission as a Reserve Officers’ Training Corps (ROTC) cadet at Arkansas State and served six months on active duty in 1956-1957. After finishing first in his class of 74 lieutenants in the field artillery officer basic course at Fort Sill, Oklahoma, he worked with howitzer crews on the firing range. He then spent 11 years in Reserve units, ending his service as a major.

== Career ==
After leaving the Army, Foreman spent five years at the Arkansas Gazette, where as a reporter he had a supporting role in covering the Little Rock Central High School desegregation crisis in 1957. He became the Gazette’s assistant city editor in 1958. In August 1959, he directed the paper’s coverage of the reopening of the city’s high schools after they had been closed for a year to avoid continuing desegregation. The reopening of the schools on a desegregated basis effectively ended the standoff between state and federal authorities. Foreman was promoted to state editor of the Gazette in 1960.

Foreman moved to The New York Times as a copy editor in July 1962, but he returned to Arkansas in December after the beginning of a printers’ strike that would close The Times and other New York dailies for four months. By this time Foreman had decided to focus his career on newsroom management, and he accepted a job as managing editor of the Pine Bluff Commercial and leader of its 20-member staff. After five years in Pine Bluff, he moved back to Little Rock in 1968 to become managing editor of the afternoon Arkansas Democrat with a staff of 60.

In 1971, Foreman was hired as executive news editor of Newsday on Long Island, overseeing final editing and production of the daily editions. After a little over a year in that job, he accepted an offer from Gene Roberts, the new executive editor of The Philadelphia Inquirer, to be Roberts’s second in command. Their partnership reversed the fortunes of what had been one of the country’s worst metropolitan dailies. Roberts focused on competitive strategy and news coverage, devoting particular attention to what became the paper’s signature enterprise reporting. Drawing on his experience in revamping two Arkansas dailies, Foreman built the Inquirer’s editing infrastructure, oversaw quality control, and directed day-to-day operations.

After Roberts retired from The Inquirer in 1990, Foreman continued to manage the newsroom for the next eight years. During this period Inquirer staff members won an additional Pulitzer Prize, making a total of 18 in Foreman’s 25-year tenure.

When Foreman retired in 1998, he joined the journalism faculty at Penn State University as a distinguished professional in residence. The following year he was appointed the inaugural Larry and Ellen Foster Professor. He established the Foster Conference of Distinguished Writers, bringing dozens of top reporters to the campus to share their experiences with students. He retired from full-time teaching in 2006 but for the next 11 years continued to manage the writers’ conference, which was renamed the Foster-Foreman Conference at the Fosters’ request.

Foreman was president of the Associated Press Managing Editors (renamed the Associated Press Media Editors) in 1990. He was a board member of the American Society of Newspaper Editors (renamed the News Leaders Association) from 1995 to 1998.

Foreman received the Benjamin Franklin Award for Excellence from the Pennsylvania News Media Association in 2017 and the Larry Foster Award for Integrity in Public Communication from the Page Center at Penn State in 2022. A scholarship fund in Foreman’s name has been established at Penn State’s Bellisario College of Communications.

== Books as co-author or co-editor ==
After his retirement as a professor, Foreman created a textbook on professional ethics that drew on his experience in developing a pioneering ethics code at The Inquirer in the 1970s and in teaching the ethics course 16 semesters at Penn State. The Ethical Journalist was published by John Wiley & Sons in 2010. In a review in Journalism & Mass Communication Quarterly, Professor Ivor Shapiro wrote: “The book’s tone is thoughtful but forthright, its style clear but engaging, its stance fair but unabashed. It’s obviously written by a practiced craftsman who is passionate about his work, and curious about its dilemmas.” Subsequent editions came out in 2015 and 2022. The 2022 edition was coauthored by three former Inquirer colleagues: Daniel R. Biddle, Emilie Lounsberry, and Richard G. Jones.

Foreman also wrote Roots and Wings: My Memories of a Childhood That Led to a Career in News, a memoir of his growing-up years in Ohio and Arkansas, as a private project for family and close friends.
