= Maribel Pérez Wadsworth =

American newspaper publisher

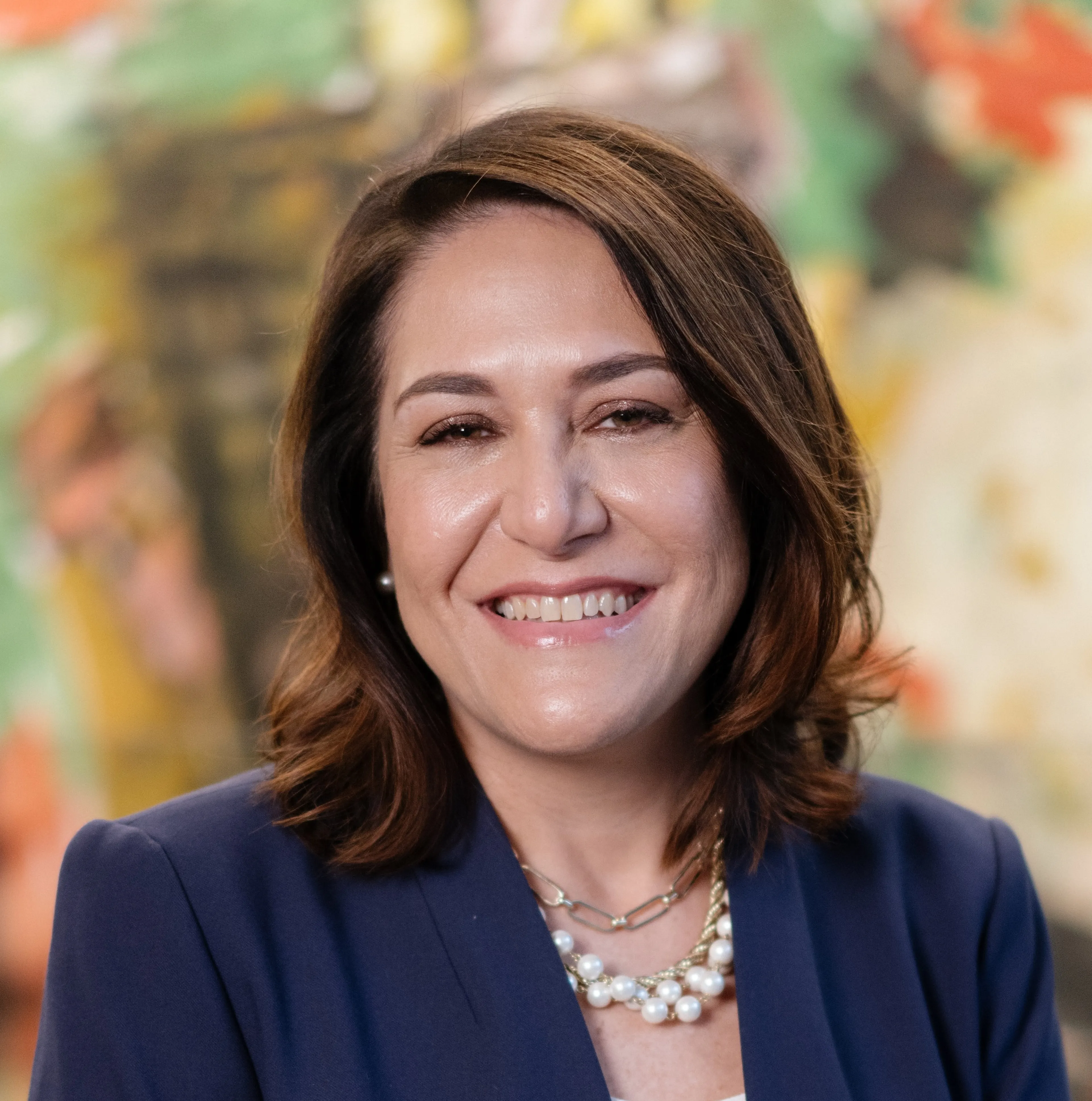
- Pérez Wadsworth in 2023
- Born: Miami
- Education: University of Miami
- Employer: Knight Foundation

Maribel Pérez Wadsworth is the 7th president and CEO of the John S. and James L. Knight Foundation. She is the first woman to lead the foundation since its founding in 1950, succeeding Alberto Ibarguen in January 2024. Before joining the Knight Foundation Pérez Wadsworth was the president of the USA Today Network and publisher of USA Today from November 2018 to December 2022.

She also currently serves on the governing board of the Pew Research Center and on the board of the Associated Press.

In May 2025, Time named Pérez Wadsworth as one of the leaders in Time 100 Philanthropy 2025.

== Early life and education ==
Pérez Wadsworth was born in Miami, to Cuban immigrant parents. She attended Coral Gables Senior High School, class of 1990, then attended the University of Miami where she received her B.S.C. from the School of Communications in Journalism in 1993. While at University of Miami she wrote for the student newspaper The Miami Hurricane, where she covered the institution and community's recovery from Hurricane Andrew in 1992.

== Career ==
She began her career as editorial assistant at the Associated Press in 1994, then heading to Rockford, Illinois to become the only Spanish-speaking reporter at the Rockford Register Star, a newspaper owned by Gannett Media.

Her time at Gannett went from 1996 to 2022, where she held various positions. In 2015, she was named as the organizations first Chief Strategy and Transformation Officer. Pérez Wadsworth continued to grow within the organization, eventually becoming the president of Gannett Media, and the publisher of USA Today. Under Pérez Wadsworth's leadership Gannett Newsrooms were recognized being awarded 5 Pulitzer Prizes in five years.

In 2016, former U.S. secretary of commerce Penny Pritzker appointed Pérez Wadsworth to a two-year term at the National Advisory Council on Innovation and Entrepreneurship.

== Knight Foundation ==
In January 2024, Pérez Wadsworth became the president of the Knight Foundation. In her first address at the 2024 Knight Media Forum, Wadsworth issued a challenge:

“It is time for philanthropy to move at the speed of news.”

This address reflected a new focus for the foundation on agility and responding to the needs of the Knight Communities. Following these remarks, Knight Foundation announced a series of new initiatives such as the Pew-Knight Initiative which seeks to empower Americans navigating the current media and technology landscape to better discern reliable information and the Poynter Institute to help educate philanthropic funders who are interested in supporting local news.

When Governor Ron DeSantis cut $32 million from all arts grants funding in the state budget, Knight Foundation stepped in and allocated a one-time general operating support grant to nearly 100 small arts programs across several Florida cities.
