= Donald K. Fry =

English literature scholar and writer (1937–2021)

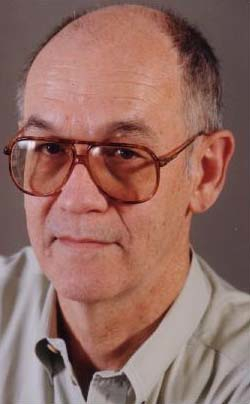
- Don Fry
- Born: March 31, 1937; Raleigh, North Carolina, U.S.
- Died: December 6, 2021 (aged 84); Charlottesville, Virginia, U.S.
- Education: Needham B. Broughton High School; Duke University; University of California at Berkeley (Ph.D.)
- Occupations: Writer and scholar
- Writing career
- Notable works: Medieval Scandinavia An Encyclopedia, Ways with Words, Coaching Writers

Donald K. "Don" Fry (March 31, 1937 – December 6, 2021) was an American writer and scholar. He began as a scholar of Old and Middle English literature at the University of Virginia and Stony Brook University. He changed fields to journalism education in 1984, joining the Poynter Institute of Media Studies in St. Petersburg, Florida, a journalism think-tank. In 1994, he became an independent writing coach.

== Life and career ==
A native of Raleigh, North Carolina, Fry learned to write from Phyllis Abbott Peacock at Needham B. Broughton High School. He earned a degree in English literature (1959) from Duke University. Fry served as a communications and gunnery officer on U.S.S. Massey (DD-778), an Atlantic Fleet destroyer (1959–1962). He was a graduate student at University of California at Berkeley, where he earned a Ph.D. in English (1966) specializing in early medieval literature.

Fry began his academic career as an assistant professor of English at the University of Virginia (1966–1969), then moved to Stony Brook University, becoming a professor of English and Comparative Literature (1969–1984). Fry chaired the Program in Comparative Literature, and the Arts and Sciences Senate, and served as Provost for Humanities and Fine Arts (1975–1977).

Fry became an Associate at the Poynter Institute in 1984, and later headed the Writing and Ethics faculties, and edited the institute's annual publication Best Newspaper Writing (1985–1990, 1993). With his colleague Roy Peter Clark Fry systemized the techniques of coaching writers, invented at the Boston Globe by Donald Murray. Fry and Clark published their methods in Coaching Writers: Editors and Reporters Working Together (St. Martin's, 1991). They expanded their coverage to multimedia in a second edition: Coaching Writers: Editors and Reporters Working Together across Media Platforms (Bedford-St. Martin's, 2003).

Fry died on December 6, 2021, in Charlottesville, Virginia.

== Works ==
=== Academic works ===
Fry began his academic writing with his 1966 dissertation, Aesthetic Applications of Oral-Formulaic Theory: Judith 199-216a, which established terminology and techniques for analyzing the artistry of formulaic poetry in England before 1066. He later published articles from this dissertation that influenced a generation of scholars studying Anglo-Saxon poetics.

Fry wrote three books on Beowulf: The Beowulf Poet: A Collection of Critical Essays (Prentice-Hall, 1968); Beowulf and the Fight at Finnsburh: A Bibliography (Virginia, 1969), praised for the "immense amount of intelligent labor" from Fry; and Finnsburg Fragment and Episode (Methuen, 1974). He also published two reference books on Old Norse: Norse Sagas Translated into English (AMS, 1980) and Medieval Scandinavia, An Encyclopedia (Garland, 1993, with Phil Pulsiano).

He was praised for his "investigation of the type-scene as an episodic unit in narrative", explaining how narratives such as Beowulf are constructed from simpler units involving repeated motifs. He also discovered a new manuscript of the Old English poem Durham.

== On writing ==
Fry taught writing skills and taught editors how to help their writers. From 2008 to 2012, he wrote a blog on “Writing Your Way, in Your Own Voice,” published by Writer's Digest in 2012 as the book Writing Your Way, Creating Your own Writing Process that Works for You. Fry taught writers to create their own writing process based on magnifying their strengths, and changing or compensating for their weaknesses. He developed techniques for creating a writing voice, defined as "devices used consistently to create the illusion of a person speaking through the text." He taught in the Greenbrier Symposium for Professional Food Writers, coaching on structure, description, and courage. After his death, his former Poynter Institute colleague and co-writer Clark called him "arguably the most well-traveled and, in that respect, most influential writing coach of the last 30 years."

== Selected bibliography ==
=== Books ===
- Pulsiano, Philip; Donald K. Fry; et al., Medieval Scandinavia An Encyclopedia. (New York: Garland, 1993).
- Fry, Don; Roy Peter Clark; and Frank Denton. Ways with Words. (Reston: American Society of Newspaper Editors, 1993).
- Clark, Roy Peter and Don Fry. Coaching Writers. (New York: St. Martin's, 1992). 2nd ed. (Bedford, St. Martin's, 2003).
- Garcia, Mario R. and Don Fry. Color in American Newspapers. (St. Petersburg: Poynter Institute, 1986).
- Fry, Don. Believing the News. (St. Petersburg: Poynter Institute, 1986).
- Fry, Don. Best Newspaper Writing, annual. (St. Petersburg: Poynter Institute, 1985–1990, 1993).
- Fry, Donald K. Norse Sagas Translated into English. (New York: AMS, 1980).
- Fry, Donald K. Finnsburh Fragment and Episode. (London: Methuen, 1974).
- Fry, Donald K. Beowulf and the Fight at Finnsburh A Bibliography. (Charlottesville: University Press of Virginia, 1969).
- Fry, Donald K. The Beowulf Poet. (Englewood Cliffs: Prentice-Hall, 1968).
