= Raymond Arsenault =

American historian and academic (born 1948)

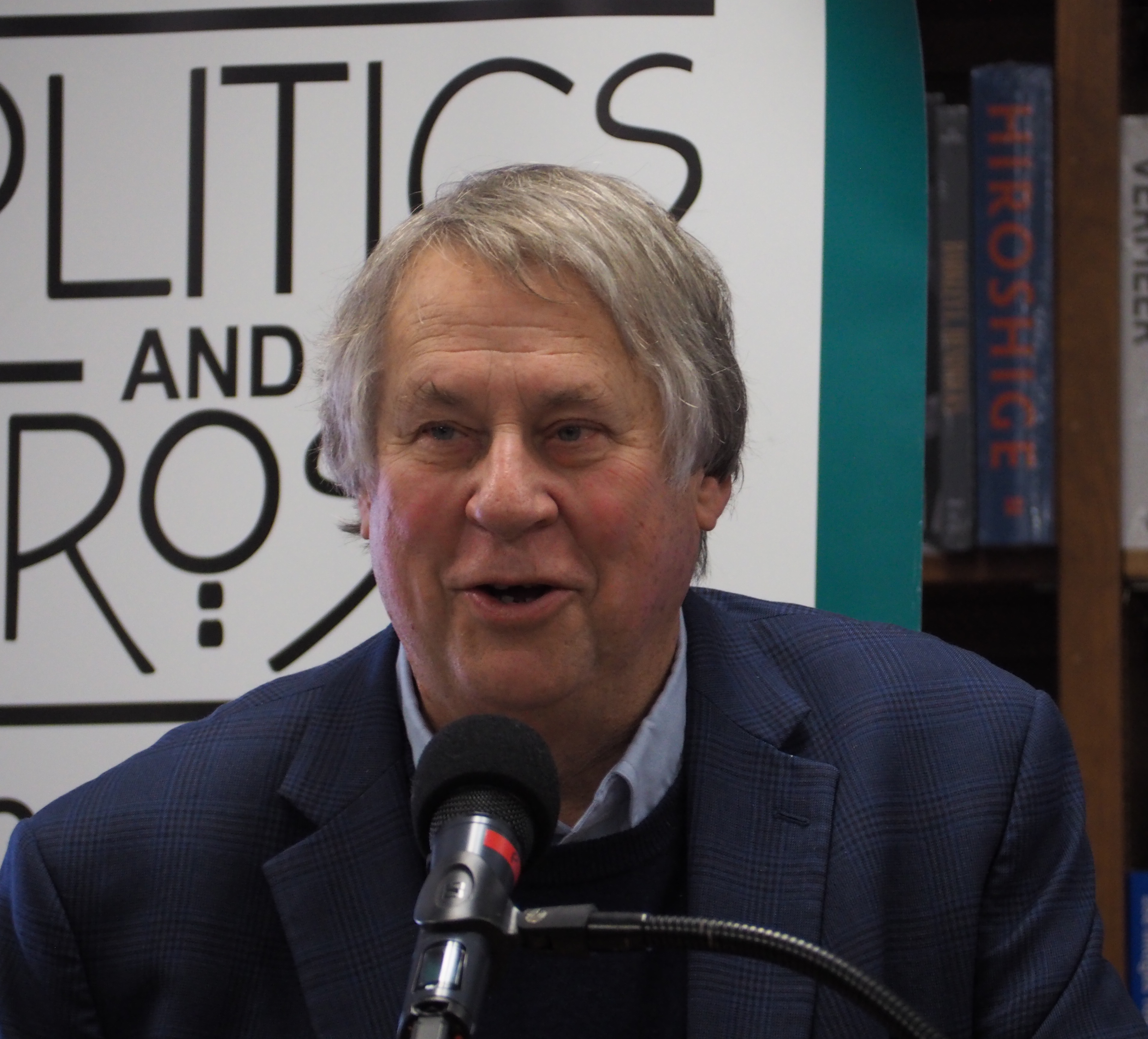
- Born: January 6, 1948 (age 78); Hyannis, Massachusetts, U.S.
- Education: Princeton University; Brandeis University
- Occupations: Academic, historian
- Employer: University of South Florida
- Known for: Freedom Riders: 1961 and the Struggle for Racial Justice (2006)
- Spouse: Kathleen Hardee Arsenault
- Children: 2 daughters
- Website: Raymond Arsenault

Raymond Ostby Arsenault (born January 6, 1948) is an American historian and academic in Florida, United States of America. He has taught at the University of South Florida, St. Petersburg campus since 1980, co-founding the Florida Studies Program (with Gary Mormino). Arsenault is a specialist in the political, social, and environmental history of the American South.

Arsenault wrote about the 1961 Freedom Rides in a 2006 book, Freedom Riders: 1961 and the Struggle for Racial Justice. His work on this critical period in the civil rights movement became the basis of a two-hour 2010 television documentary film, Freedom Riders. He appeared on The Oprah Winfrey Show in an episode dedicated to Freedom Riders. He has been awarded the Frank L. and Harriet C. Owsley Award of the Southern Historical Association and the 2006 PSP Award for Excellence Honorable Mention History & American Studies.

== Early life and education ==
Raymond Arsenault was born in Hyannis, Massachusetts, in 1948. He holds a B.A. degree in history from Princeton University (1969, magna cum laude), and an M.A. (1974) and PhD in American History from Brandeis University (1981).

== Career ==
Arsenault has taught at the University of Minnesota, Brandeis University, and a Universite d’Angers in France, where he was a Fulbright Lecturer in 1984–85. He has served as a consultant for numerous museums and public institutions, including the National Park Service, the National Civil Rights Museum, the Rosa Parks Library and Museum at Troy University in Alabama, and the United States Information Agency.

He has taught at the University of South Florida, St. Petersburg campus, since 1980 and is the John Hope Franklin Professor of Southern History and was founding co-director of the Florida Studies Program (with Gary Mormino).

== Personal life ==
He is married to Kathleen Hardee Arsenault, retired university library dean, and the couple have two daughters, Amelia and Anne.

== Publications ==
- 1984: The Wild Ass of the Ozarks: Jeff Davis and the Social Bases of Southern Politics. Philadelphia: Temple University Press ISBN 9780877223269 (paperback: Knoxville: University of Tennessee Press, 1988). (Awarded the 1985 Virginia Ledbetter Prize)
- 1984: "The End of the Long Hot Summer: The Air Conditioner and Southern Culture". Journal of Southern History. 50(4): 597–628. doi:10.2307/2208474
- 1988: St. Petersburg and the Florida Dream, 1888–1950. Norfolk: Donning. (2nd edition: Gainesville: University Press of Florida, 1996; paperback edition, 1998). ISBN 9780898657401 (Awarded the 1990 Charlton Tebeau Prize)
- 1991: (Editor) Crucible of Liberty: 200 Years of the Bill of Rights. New York: The Free Press, 1991. ISBN 9780029010549
- 2002: (Co-editor with Roy Peter Clark) The Changing South of Gene Patterson: Journalism and Civil Rights, 1960–1968. Gainesville: University Press of Florida.
- 2005: (Co-editor with Jack E. Davis) Paradise Lost? The Environmental History of Florida. Gainesville: University Press of Florida.
- 2006: Freedom Riders: 1961 and the Struggle for Racial Justice, New York: Oxford University Press; paperback 2007. - Wikipedia article on the book: Freedom Riders: 1961 and the Struggle for Racial Justice
- 2008: (Editor) The Third Space of Enunciation: Proceedings of the English Department Conference, 9–10 March 2006 (Gabes, Tunisia: High Institute of Languages, Gabes, 2008).
- 2009: The Sound of Freedom: Marian Anderson, the Lincoln Memorial, and the Concert That Awakened America, New York: Bloomsbury Press. ISBN 1-59691-578-1.
- 2011: Abridged version: Freedom Riders: 1961 and the Struggle for Racial Justice, New York: Oxford University Press.
- 2013: (Co-editor with Vernon Burton) Dixie Redux: Essays in Honor of Sheldon Hackney. Montgomery: New South Books, ISBN 9781588382979.
- 2018: Arthur Ashe: A Life. Simon & Schuster, ISBN 978-1439189047.
- 2024: John Lewis: In Search of the Beloved Community. Yale University Press, ISBN 978-0300253757
