= News Leaders Association =

American journalism organization

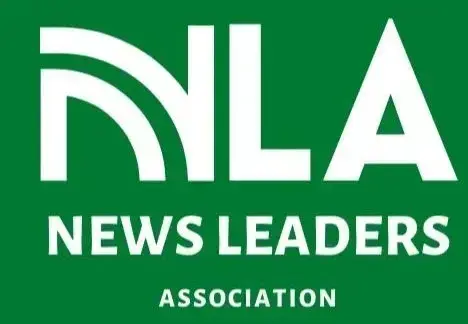
- Founded: 2019
- Dissolved: 2024, merged with American Society of News Editors, Associated Press Media Editors and Association of Opinion Journalists
- Type: Nonprofit
- Purpose: Journalism-related and First Amendment issues
- Headquarters: Reynolds Journalism Institute at the Missouri School of Journalism
- Website: newsleaders.org

News Leaders Association (NLA) was a non-profit organization that focused on training and supporting journalists. It was formed by the 2019 merger of the American Society of News Editors and Associated Press Media Editors.

== History ==
In 1922, the American Society of Newspaper Editors was formed by top editors to elevate the professionalism and ethics of the journalism business. In 1931, managing editors felt they needed their own organization, forming the Associated Press Managing Editors. Both organizations would later change their names to reflect the changing industry: ASNE became the American Society of News Editors in 2009 and APME became the Associated Press Media Editors in 2011. In 2016, the Association of Opinion Journalists was merged with ASNE.

By 2018, the need for two separate organizations was not needed and hence they were merged to form the News Leaders Association. At the 2019 annual conference of APME and ASNE, the merger was approved.

In 2020, the NLA canceled its annual conference, postponing it to spring 2021.

On December 8, 2023, the NLA's board of directors unanimously approved the NLA membership’s November vote to dissolve organization and distribute its remaining assets to other nonprofits by June 30, 2024.

== Programs ==
=== Diversity Survey ===
In 1978, ASNE launched an annual diversity survey of America's newsrooms. NLA continued this work, under the name "Transformative Transparency Project".

In a 2021 interview with Open the Government, NLA executive director Fran Reilly explained, "We have created an expanded program that is designed to meet the urgency of the lack of DEI in journalism—we will soon be rolling out the Transformative Transparency Project, which still uses a data collection framework to gain insights to understand the full scope of the problem, but is expanded to include tools, resources and programs to help newsrooms improve their DEI culture, and set and reach diversity goals."

NLA paused the survey in 2020 to rework it after years of lackluster participation. In 2021, NLA choose not to release the results of that year's diversity survey, citing problems with the collected demographic information. Those issues included discrepancies in how certain racial and ethnic categories were counted and percentages that did not add up to 100.

In 2022, while NLA had planned for 2,500 print and online organizations to participate in the survey, only 303 news organizations responded that year, down from 429 orgs that responded in 2019, but up from the 293 that responded in 2018, which was the historic low-water mark for participation.

=== Sunshine Week ===
Sunshine Week is a national initiative spearheaded by the News Leaders Association to educate the public about the importance of open government and freedom of information. It was established in March 2005 and is celebrated annually during the week containing March 16, which is National Freedom of Information Day.

In December 2023, NLA transferred stewardship of Sunshine Week to the Joseph L. Brechner Freedom of Information (FOI) Project at the University of Florida College of Journalism and Communications.

=== Annual Awards ===
NLA recognized excellence in journalism and leadership with their annual awards. The NLA Awards continued the long traditions of the previous ASNE and APME Awards, and are among the most prestigious in journalism.

In 2021, a new award was created to recognize an editor or team of editors who have displayed strong leadership in matching the extraordinary moment of an unprecedented year through great journalism and vital decision making on all fronts. Ron Nixon, Associated Press global investigations editor, was named the inaugural News Leader of the Year.

On November 30, 2023, it was announced the NLA transitioned stewardship of the NLA Awards to the Poynter Institute, who will administer the contest from 2024 onward. The awards were renamed to The Poynter Journalism Prizes.
