= American Society of News Editors =

American journalistic organization

- Abbreviation: ASNE
- Merged into: News Leaders Association
- Formation: 1922
- Type: NGO
- Legal status: Defunct, 2019
- Purpose: Journalism-related and First Amendment issues
- Headquarters: (from 2012) Reynolds Journalism Institute at the Missouri School of Journalism, Columbia, Missouri
- Formerly called: American Society of Newspaper Editors

The American Society of News Editors (ASNE) was a membership organization for editors, producers or directors in charge of journalistic organizations or departments, deans or faculty at university journalism schools, and leaders and faculty of media-related foundations and training organizations. In 2019, it merged with the Associated Press Media Editors to become the News Leaders Association.

== History ==
The American Society of Newspaper Editors formed after two United States publications took the newspaper industry to task. In January 1922, The Atlantic Monthly featured two articles by Frederick Lewis Allen and Moorfield Storey which were critical of the way in which newspapers were published, and requested change. After reading the articles, Casper Yost — the longtime editor of the St. Louis Globe-Democrat and himself a respected journalist — saw the need for forming an organization of editors willing to combat criticism.

Yost wrote to a few dozen editors soliciting support. The responses were positive and, just a month later, in February 1922, a small meeting was held in Chicago. Attendees included Yost and editors from Cleveland, Detroit, and Chicago. They gathered to discuss action they could take for the advancement of the news and editorial side, to develop a constitution and a code of ethics, and to launch a recruiting campaign for the group. The editors called a meeting in New York that April, when editors would be joining their publishers and congregating for the annual American Newspaper Publishers Association (ANPA) meeting (despite no formal mention of them by ANPA in its bulletins). Their efforts were so successful that by October nearly 100 charter members had signed up.

The organization amended its bylaws and changed its name to the American Society of News Editors in April, 2009.

In 2012, the ASNE entered into a partnership with the Reynolds Journalism Institute at the Missouri School of Journalism and moved its headquarters from Reston, Virginia, to Columbia, Missouri.

In 2016, the Association of Opinion Journalists was merged with ASNE.

In 2018, a merger of ASNE with Associated Press Media Editors was announced. From this merger, the News Leaders Association was formed.

== Organizational goals ==
In October 1922, ASNE was launched with directors and officers; they hammered out a code of ethics, named committees and made preparations for the first convention at the New Willard Hotel in Washington the next April. The founders decided that ASNE would be an organization of individual editors of big-city papers — limiting membership to editors of newspapers in cities of 100,000 or more. Since then, rules have been loosened extensively.

== Annual meetings ==
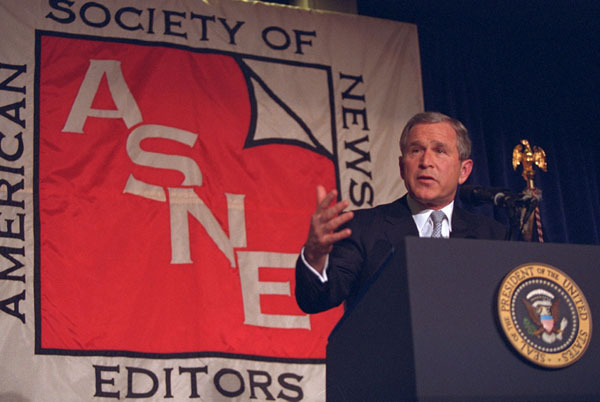
President George W. Bush speaking at the annual convention of the American Society of Newspaper Editors in 2001.

The annual convention was held annually — with the exception of 1945 and 2009 — mostly in Washington, D.C.

Over the years, every current U.S. president spoke at the organization's convention and it was considered a premier venue for politicians to appear. Notable examples are President Coolidge's Press Under a Free Government speech and President Eisenhower's Chance for Peace speech.

== Activities ==
ASNE had several initiatives carried out by its committees. The Diversity Committee was formed to evaluate employee diversity using the Newsroom Employment Census. The census queried every daily newspaper and online news site in the United States to determine the number of news staffers as well as their gender and race as part of the organization's yearly census. The survey continues via News Leaders Association.

Sunshine Week is an annual event led by ASNE that promotes open government and transparent journalism.

== Awards ==
The ASNE Awards were another key initiative of the organization. They included:

- Batten Medal
- Osborn Award for Editorial Leadership
- Sulzberger Award for Online Storytelling
- Howell Award for Nondeadline Writing
- Royko Award for Commentary/Column Writing
- Distinguished Writing on Diversity Award
- Local Accountability Reporting Award
- Community Service Photojournalism Award
- Breaking News Writing award
- Raymond Clapper Memorial Award (c. 1951 to c. 1965)

== Projects ==
ASNE also ran several projects, generally carried out by staff with advice from committees. Projects subject areas have included diversity, credibility and readership.

During the early 2010s, ASNE ran my.hsj.org, which acted as a webhosting platform for high school newspapers and featured lessons in journalism, publishing, and advertising. By 2013, the website hosted over 5000 different newspapers. ASNE shut down the website in September of that year, stating that there are "so many more options available to schools".

== Presidents of The ASNE ==
- Source: "History". News Leaders Association.

- 1922–1926: Casper S. Yost, St. Louis Globe-Democrat
- 1926–1928: E. C. Hopwood, Cleveland Plain Dealer
- 1928–1930: Walter M. Harrison, The Oklahoman
- 1930–1933: Fred Fuller Shedd, Philadelphia Evening Bulletin
- 1933–1934: Paul Bellamy, Cleveland Plain Dealer
- 1934–1936: Grove Patterson, The Blade (Toledo, Ohio)
- 1936–1937: Marvin H. Creager, Milwaukee Journal
- 1937–1938: A. H. Kirchhofer, Buffalo Evening News
- 1938–1939: William Allen White, Emporia Gazette
- 1939–1940: Donald J. Sterling, Oregon Journal
- 1940–1941: Tom Wallace, The Louisville Times
- 1941–1942: Dwight Marvin, The Record (Troy)
- 1942–1943: W. S. Gilmore, Detroit News
- 1943–1944: Roy A. Roberts, The Kansas City Star
- 1944–1946: John S. Knight, Knight Newspapers
- 1946–1947: Wilbur Forrest, New York Herald Tribune
- 1947–1948: N. R. Howard, Cleveland News
- 1948–1949: Erwin D. Canham, The Christian Science Monitor
- 1949–1950: B. M. McKelway, Washington Star
- 1950–1951: Dwight Young, Dayton Journal-Herald
- 1951–1952: Alexander F. Jones, Syracuse Herald-Journal
- 1952–1953: Wright Bryan, Atlanta Journal
- 1953–1954: Basil L. Walters, Knight Newspapers
- 1954–1955: James S. Pope, Courier-Journal and Louisville Times
- 1955–1956: Kenneth MacDonald, Des Moines Register and Tribune
- 1956–1957: Jenkin Lloyd Jones Sr., Tulsa Tribune
- 1957–1958: Virginius Dabney, Richmond Times-Dispatch
- 1958–1959: George W. Healy Jr., New Orleans Times-Picayune
- 1959–1960: J. R. Wiggins, Washington Post
- 1960–1961: Turner Catledge, New York Times
- 1961–1962: Felix R. McKnight, Dallas Times Herald
- 1962–1963: Lee Hills, Knight Newspapers
- 1963–1964: Herbert Brucker, Hartford Courant
- 1964–1965: Miles H. Wolff, Greensboro Daily News
- 1965–1966: Vermont Royster, Wall Street Journal
- 1966–1967: Robert C. Notson, Portland Oregonian
- 1967–1968: Michael J. Ogden, The Providence Journal and Bulletin
- 1968–1969: Vincent S. Jones, Gannett Newspapers
- 1969–1970: Norman E. Isaacs, Courier-Journal and Louisville Times
- 1970–1971: Newbold Noyes, Washington Star
- 1971–1972: C. A. McKnight, The Charlotte Observer
- 1972–1973: J. Edward Murray, Detroit Free Press
- 1973–1974: Arthur C. Deck, Salt Lake Tribune
- 1974–1975: Howard H Hays Jr., The Press-Enterprise
- 1975–1976: Warren H. Phillips, The Wall Street Journal
- 1976–1977: George Chaplin, The Honolulu Advertiser
- 1977–1978: Eugene C. Patterson, St. Petersburg Times
- 1978–1979: John Hughes, The Christian Science Monitor
- 1979–1980: William H. Hornby, The Denver Post
- 1980–1981: Thomas Winship, The Boston Globe
- 1981–1982: Michael J. O'Neill, New York Daily News
- 1982–1983: John C. Quinn, Gannett Newspapers
- 1983–1984: Creed C. Black, Lexington Herald-Leader
- 1984–1985: Richard D. Smyser, The Oak Ridger
- 1985–1986: Robert P. Clark, Harte-Hanks Newspapers
- 1986–1987: Michael G. Gartner, The Courier-Journal
- 1987–1988: Katherine W. Fanning, The Christian Science Monitor
- 1988–1988: Edward R. Cony, The Wall Street Journal
- 1988–1989: John Seigenthaler, USA Today and The Tennessean
- 1989–1990: Loren Ghiglione, The News
- 1990–1991: Burl Osborne, The Dallas Morning News
- 1991–1992: David Lawrence Jr., The Miami Herald
- 1992–1993: Seymour Topping, The New York Times
- 1993–1994: William A. Hilliard, The Oregonian
- 1994–1995: Gregory Favre, The Sacramento Bee
- 1995–1996: William B. Ketter, The Patriot Ledger
- 1996–1997: Robert H. Giles, The Detroit News
- 1997–1998: Sandra Mims Rowe, The Oregonian
- 1998–1999: Edward L. Seaton, The Manhattan Mercury
- 1999–2000: N. Christian Anderson, The Orange County Register
- 2000–2001: Richard A. Oppel, Austin American-Statesman
- 2001–2002: Tim J. McGuire, Star Tribune
- 2002–2003: Diane H. McFarlin, Sarasota Herald Tribune
- 2003–2004: Peter K. Bhatia, The Oregonian
- 2004–2005: Karla Garrett Harshaw, Springfield News-Sun
- 2005–2006: Rick Rodriguez, The Sacramento Bee
- 2006–2007: David A. Zeeck, The News Tribune
- 2007–2008: Gilbert Bailon, Al Día, and St. Louis Post-Dispatch
- 2008–2009: Charlotte H. Hall, Orlando Sentinel
- 2009–2010: Martin Kaiser, Milwaukee Journal Sentinel
- 2010–2011: Milton Coleman, The Washington Post
- 2011–2012: Ken Paulson, First Amendment Center
- 2012–2013: Susan Goldberg, Bloomberg
- 2013–2014: David Boardman, Temple University
- 2014–2015: Chris Peck, The Riverton Ranger (Riverton, Wyoming)
- 2015–2016: Pam Fine, The University of Kansas
- 2016–2017: Mizell Stewart III, Gannett and USA TODAY Network
- 2017–2018: Alfredo Carabajal, Al Día at The Dallas Morning News

== See also ==
- White House Correspondents' Association
