= Vernon Burton =

American historian (born 1947)

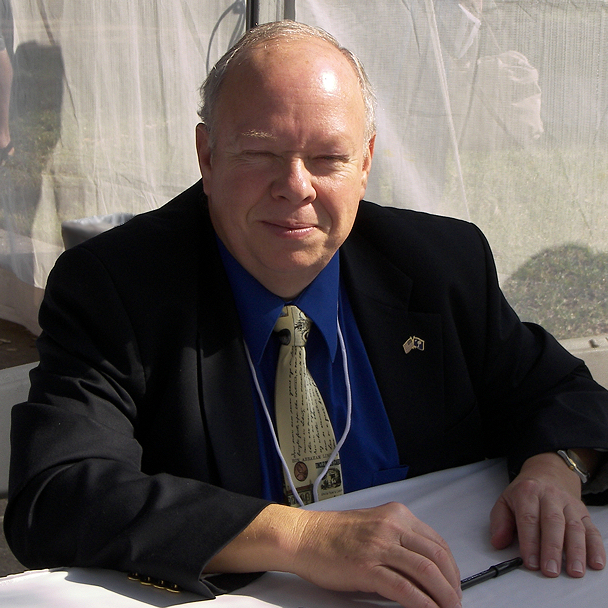
- Burton at the 2007 Texas Book Festival
- Spouse: Georganne
- Awards: U.S. Research and Doctoral University Professor of the Year (1999); American Historical Association’s Eugene Asher Distinguished Teacher Award (2003)

Academic background
- Education: Furman University; Princeton University

Academic work
- Discipline: History, Social science

Orville Vernon Burton is a professor of history at Clemson University, the director of its Clemson CyberInstitute, and an author. He formerly served as director of the Institute for Computing in Humanities, Arts, and Social Science (CHASS) and professor of history and sociology at the University of Illinois Urbana-Champaign. He is also a senior research scientist at the National Center for Supercomputing Applications, where he is associate director for humanities and social sciences.

== Career ==
Burton was born in Royston, Georgia and grew up in Ninety Six, South Carolina. He received a B.A. in 1969 for his undergraduate studies at Furman University. After service in the Army Reserve he entered graduate school at Princeton University. His dissertation involved tens of thousands of IBM cards on individuals and farms for a county in South Carolina in the mid 19th century. His undergraduate research assistant was Sonia Sotomayor, who later became a Justice on the U.S. Supreme Court. He received his Ph.D. in 1976 working under professor Sheldon Hackney. He joined the History faculty at the University of Illinois, rising to full professor.

Burton has authored more than a hundred articles and wrote or edited fourteen books. His dissertation was published in 1985 by the University of North Carolina Press as In My Father's House Are Many Mansions: Family and Community in Edgefield, South Carolina. It became the subject of sessions at the Southern Historical Association and the Social Science History Association's annual meetings. He wrote The Age of Lincoln, winner of the 2007 Chicago Tribune Heartland Prize for non-fiction. With civil rights lawyer Armand Derfner in 2021, Burton published Justice Deferred: Race and the Supreme Court, a lengthy survey of race-related cases on the US Supreme Court.

== Honors and awards ==
At Illinois Burton won teaching awards at the department, school, college, and campus levels and received the 2006 Campus Award for Excellence in Public Engagement.

In 2002 Burton served as president of the Agricultural History Society. He served as president of the Southern Historical Association in 2012. He was selected nationwide as the 1999 U.S. Research and Doctoral University Professor of the Year (presented by the Carnegie Foundation for the Advancement of Teaching and by the Council for Advancement and Support of Education). He received the American Historical Association’s Eugene Asher Distinguished Teacher Award for 2003.

== Bibliography: Books by Burton ==
- Toward A New South? Studies in Post-Civil War Southern Communities (Greenwood, 1982) coeditor with Robert C. McMath, Jr.
- Class, Conflict, and Consensus: Antebellum Southern Community Studies (Greenwood, 1982), coeditor with Robert C. McMath, Jr.
- In My Father's House Are Many Mansions: Family and Community in Edgefield, South Carolina (1987) online
- A Gentleman and an Officer: A Military and Social History of James B. Griffin's Civil War (1996)
- Computing in the Social Sciences and Humanities (2002), editor. online
- The Free Flag of Cuba: The Lost Novel of Lucy Holcombe Pickens (2002) coeditor with Georganne B. Burton, online
- The Age of Lincoln (Hill and Wang, 2008) online
- Toward the meeting of the waters: Currents in the civil rights movement of South Carolina during the twentieth century. (Univ of South Carolina Press, 2008), coeditor with Winfred B. Moore. online
- Dixie Redux: Essays in Honor of Sheldon Hackney. Montgomery: New South Books. (2013) (co-editor with Raymond Arsenault)
- Justice Deferred: Race and the Supreme Court. Cambridge, MA: Harvard University Press. (2021) (with Armand Derfner)

=== Scholarly articles by Burton ===
- "Race and Reconstruction: Edgefield County, South Carolina." Journal of Social History 12.1 (1978): 31-56.
- "Using the Computer and Manuscript Census Returns to Teach American Social History." History Teacher 13#1 (Nov., 1979), pp. 71–88 online
- "Anatomy of an Antebellum Rural Free Black Community: Social Structure and Social Interaction in Edgefield District, South Carolina, 1850–1860." Southern Studies 21.3 (1982): 294-325.
- "Edgefield Reconstruction: Political Black Leaders." Proceedings of the South Carolina Historical Association (1988), pp. 27–38.
- “Developing Computer Assisted Instructional (CAI) Materials in the American History Surveys.” The History Teacher 24#1 (1990), pp. 67–78. coauthor with Terence Finnegan. online
- "The Modern 'New' South in a Postmodern Academy: A Review Essay." Journal of Southern History 62#4 (1996), pp. 767–86. online
- "African American Status and Identity in a Postbellum Community: An Analysis of the Manuscript Census Returns" Agricultural History 72#2 (1998), pp. 213–240 online
- "Reaping What We Sow: Community and Rural History." Agricultural History 76.4 (2002): 631-658. online, presidential address to Agricultural History Society.
- "Lucy Holcombe Pickens, Southern Writer." The South Carolina Historical Magazine 103.4 (2002): 296-324, with Georganne B. Burton. online
- "American digital history." Social Science Computer Review 23.2 (2005): 206-220.
- "Author's Response to the Southern Intellectual History Circle Forum on The Age of Lincoln." Journal of the Historical Society (2009) 9#3 pp. 355–372. online
- "The South as 'Other,' the Southerner as Stranger." Journal of Southern History, 79 (Feb. 2013), 7–50. his 2012 presidential address to Southern Historical Association online
- "Voting Rights in Georgia: A Short History." Southern Cultures 30.1 (2024): 80-97, with Peter Eisenstadt. abstract

=== Primary sources ===
- "Digital History Memories." Southern Quarterly 58.1 (2020): 120-146. with Simon Appleford. excerpt
- Rosenzweig, Roy and Kelly Schrum, eds. Interviews with Exemplary Teachers: Orville Vernon Burton and Beverly San Augustín The History Teacher 35#2 (2002), pp. 237–260 online.
