= Creed Black =

American newspaper executive and publisher

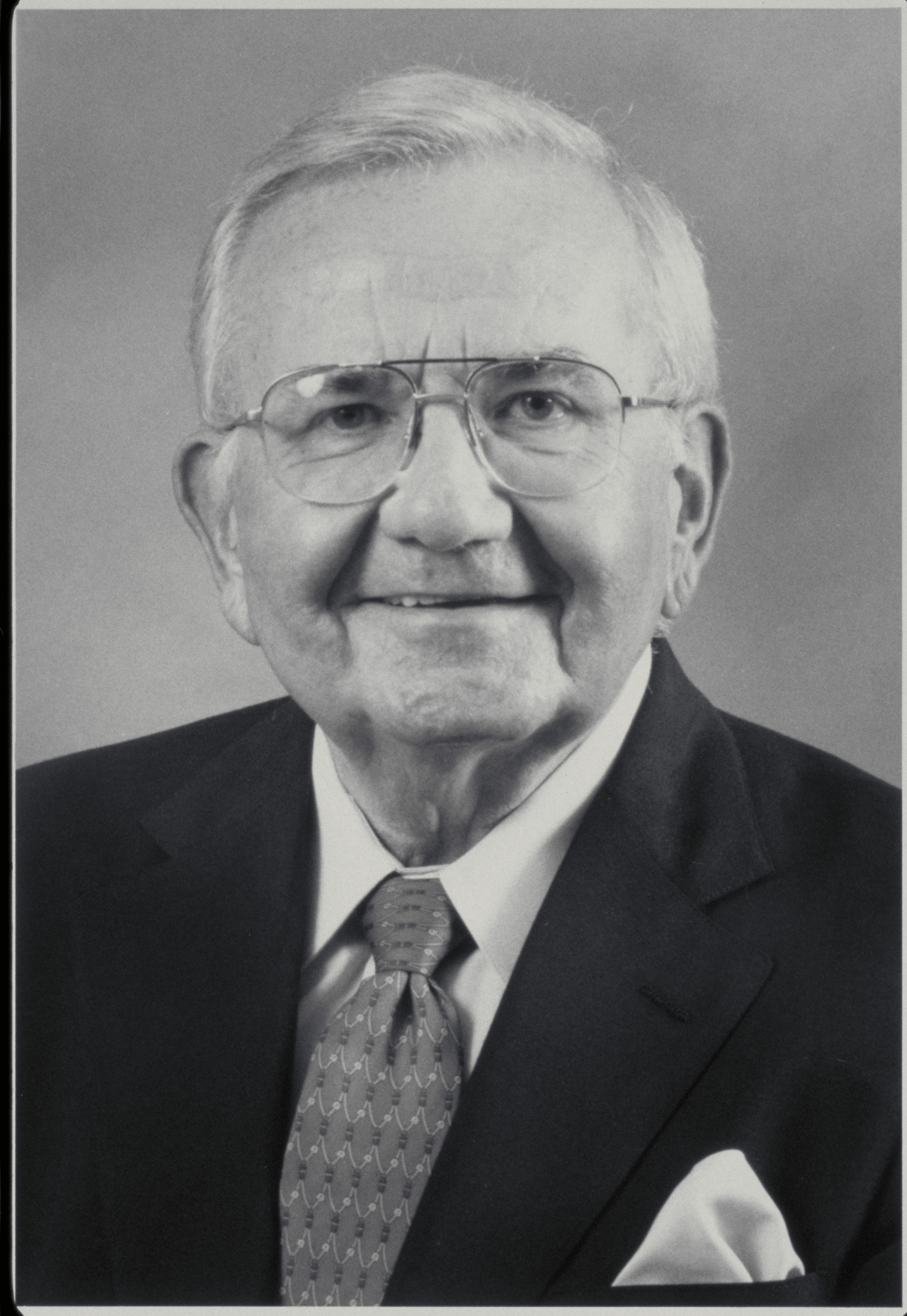
Black circa 1997

Creed Carter Black (July 15, 1925 – August 16, 2011) was an American newspaper executive and publisher of the Lexington Herald-Leader from 1977 to 1987, where he published a series of articles on corruption in Kentucky's coal industry and the University of Kentucky's Wildcats men's basketball team. In addition, Black also worked as an executive for The Nashville Tennessean, Savannah Morning News, the now defunct Savannah Evening Press, Chicago Daily News and The Philadelphia Inquirer during his career. Black served as the president of the John S. and James L. Knight Foundation, the National Conference of Editorial Writers, the American Society of Newspaper Editors and the Southern Newspaper Publishers Association. As president of the foundation, he reportedly quadrupled its endowment and made it "a billion-dollar philanthropic powerhouse".

Outside of journalism, Black served as an assistant secretary of health, education and welfare for legislation during the first eighteen months of President Richard Nixon's first term in office.

Black was born on July 15, 1925, in Harlan, Kentucky. His father was struck and killed by lightning when he was five years old and he moved to Paducah with his mother. He began his career in professional journalism by working at the Paducah Sun-Democrat as a part-time journalist when he was seventeen years old. He enlisted in the U.S. Army during World War II, serving in the infantry in the European Theater. He was awarded the Bronze Star during the war. Black obtained his bachelor's degree from Northwestern University and his master's degree from the University of Chicago after the war.

Creed Black died of complications from a stroke in Miami, Florida, on August 16, 2011, at the age of 86.
