= Freedom Riders (film) =

2010 American historical documentary film

- Film poster
- Directed by: Stanley Nelson Jr.
- Written by: Stanley Nelson Jr.
- Produced by: Stanley Nelson Jr.; Laurens Grant
- Production company: Firelight Media
- Distributed by: International Film Circuit
- Release date: February 2010 (Santa Barbara)
- Running time: 120 minutes
- Country: United States
- Language: English

Freedom Riders is a 2010 American historical documentary film, produced by Firelight Media for the twenty-third season of American Experience on PBS. The film is based in part on the book Freedom Riders: 1961 and the Struggle for Racial Justice by historian Raymond Arsenault. Directed by Stanley Nelson, it marked the 50th anniversary of the first Freedom Ride in May 1961 and first aired on May 16, 2011. It was funded in part by the National Endowment for the Humanities. The film was also featured on The Oprah Winfrey Show program titled, Freedom Riders: 50th Anniversary. Nelson was helped in the making of the documentary by Arsenault and Derek Catsam, an associate professor at the University of Texas of the Permian Basin.

In 2020, the film was selected for preservation in the United States National Film Registry by the Library of Congress as being "culturally, historically, or aesthetically significant", making it the seventh film designated in its first year of eligibility, the first in the 2010s, and the most recently released film to be selected until 2011's Pariah was inducted in 2022.

== Summary ==
The film chronicles the story behind hundreds of civil rights activists called Freedom Riders that challenged racial segregation in American interstate transportation during the Civil Rights Movement. The activists traveled together in small interracial groups and sat wherever they chose on buses and trains to compel equal access to terminal restaurants and waiting rooms. They brought the ongoing practice of racial segregation in the southern United States to national attention.

== Reception and legacy ==
Freedom Riders has received generally positive reviews from television critics and parents of young children. Michael Sragow of The Baltimore Sun wrote, "One of the great social epics of our time."

In 2020, the film was selected for preservation in the United States National Film Registry by the Library of Congress as being "culturally, historically, or aesthetically significant". It was the first film in the 2010s to be put in the registry.

== Awards ==
- 2010: Official Selection, Full Frame Documentary Film Festival
- 2010: Official Selection, Maryland Film Festival
- 2010: Official Selection, Silverdocs Documentary Film Festival
- 2010: Official Selection, Sundance Film Festival
- 2011: Heartland Film Festival: Best Documentary Feature
- 2011: Japan Prize: Welfare Category
- 2012: Primetime Emmy Award: Exceptional Merit in Nonfiction Filmmaking
- 2012: Primetime Emmy Award: Outstanding Picture Editing for Nonfiction Programming
- 2012: Primetime Emmy Award: Outstanding Writing for Nonfiction Programming
- 2012: Eddie Award: Best Edited Documentary
- 2012: Writers Guild of America Award: Best Documentary Screenplay: Nominated

== See also ==
- Civil rights movement in popular culture
- Freedom Riders National Monument
