= Freedom Riders: 1961 and the Struggle for Racial Justice =

2006 book by Raymond Arsenault

- Author: Raymond Arsenault
- Language: English
- Publisher: Oxford University Press
- Publication date: 2006
- ISBN: 978-0-19-513674-6 (first edition)
- Dewey Decimal: 323.097509046
- LC Class: E185.61 .A69

Freedom Riders: 1961 and the Struggle for Racial Justice is a 2006 non-fiction book by Raymond Arsenault, published by Oxford University Press.

The scope of the book ranges from the Irene Morgan case and the Journey of Reconciliation. The ending of the book refers to Irene Morgan.

According to David Hackett Fischer and James M. McPherson, this is the first book on the topic, written by someone who adopted being a historian as a career, that is "full-scale". Todd Moye of the University of North Texas described the work as "a travelogue of the modern civil rights movement".

An abridged version was released in 2011.

== Background ==
The author used scholarly works that were recent and that were older, as well as handwritten or typed documents from archives within the District of Columbia and eleven states. These archives had over 41 collections of such. The author also used interviews of more than 200 people, documents from the Federal Bureau of Investigation (FBI), historical books written for the general public, legal documents, memoirs, newspapers, documents held by individual people, and works that synthesized other works.

== Contents ==
John Hope Franklin is the person the book is dedicated to.

Arsenault makes it clear that the Freedom Rides were a process that spanned multiple decades, versus the public perception of them taking place only in 1961. Additionally, the work notes that 24% of respondents of a Gallup Poll conducted in 1961 were in favor of the Freedom Rides, while 66% of the respondents of the same poll believed that racial segregation in bus transportation should be abolished; by the time the book was published, reception was highly positive to the Freedom Rides.

The main themes from Freedom Riders: 1961 and the Struggle for Racial Justice include law vs. enforcement, youth leadership, violence as exposure, federal reluctance, and strategic nonviolence.

Chapter 1 discusses on Irene Morgan's 1944 arrest and the 1946 Supreme Court decision (Morgan v. Virginia). Irene Morgan refused to give up her seat on the bus, which lead to her arrest and the NAACP taking on her case. The Supreme Court ruled that segregation in interstate travel unconstitutional, but the ruling was weakly enforced. Southern states and bus companies ignored this ruling or found loopholes around it.

Chapter 2 focuses on the 1947 Journey of Reconciliation, organized by CORE. The early Freedom Rides tested the Morgan v. Virginia decision. Interracial groups rode buses through the Upper South. Participants faced arrests and violence, but less national attention.

Chapter 3 describes the planning process for the 1961 Freedom Rides. These rides were organized by CORE, which is led by James Farmer and inspired by Gandhian nonviolence and early protests. The riders were trained to endure the violence. The movement became more intentional, strategic, and confrontational.

Chapter 4 covers the increase of violence in Alabama. Rider were attacked by bus bombing in Anniston, Alabama and there were brutal beating with police assistance in Birmingham, Alabama. Southern resistance is violent and coordinated, exposing the limits of local law enforcement.

Chapter 5 explains the time when the initial rides collapse and students from Nashville step in to help. These Nashville students were led by Diane Nash and SNCC activists. Their goal was to not allow violence to stop the movement and pressure the federal government to act. Leadership shifted to younger activists, which caused the movement to become more decentralized and resilient.

Chapter 6 has a focus on the Montgomery crisis, where riders attract massive mob violence. The attack on a church gathering supporters such as Martin Luther King Jr. is also explained. Violence forced federal involvement, which escalates the issue nationally.

Chapter 7 shows the shift to the Mississippi strategy, where instead of mobs, officials turned to mass arrests. Riders were immediately jailed on minor charges. This causes the movement to become a battle over legal rights and imprisonment.

Chapter 8 features details of the imprisonment in Parchman Penitentiary. People faced harsh conditions such as isolation, punishment, and psychological pressure. Riders maintained discipline and solidarity, as suffering became a deliberate strategy to gain attention and moral authority.

Chapter 9 goes into detail about the expansion of the movement when hundred of new Rider joined. With the increase in Riders, the jails were filling up which causes excess pressure on the authorities. This also caused financial and organizational strain of civil rights groups.

Chapter 10 show the increase of national and in international attention. The included media coverage that exposed the hypocrisy from the United States during the Cold War. Federal government then faced diplomatic pressure causing the Kennedy administration to, reluctantly, get more involved.

Chapter 11 focuses on the resolution of the Crisis, talking about how the Interstate Commerce Commission enforced desegregation causing bus terminals and interstate travel to be officially integrated. This represents a major policy victory.

The epilogue reflects on the long-term impact of this Freedom Riders movement and how it inspired future movements such as Freedom Summer. This also demonstrate the power of grassroots activism and media attention and highlights the role of ordinary people being able to make powerful changes.

The ending gives honor to Irene Morgan Kirkaldy.

The book has an appendix that documents the people who participated in the Freedom Rides, numbering 436.

The original version has and introduction, 11 chapters, and an epilogue, and the abridged version has ten chapters.

== Reception ==
=== Original version ===
Eric Foner stated that the book "brings vividly to life" the subject, and that it uses "dramatic, often moving detail." Foner wished that the author had done more analyses of the demographics of the Freedom Riders.

Kenneth T. Andrews of the University of North Carolina at Chapel Hill described the work as "definitive history of" the subject and that it is "finely crafted".

Nicky Cashman of the University of Wales, Aberystwyth (now Aberystwyth University) described the book as "exceptionally well-documented and annotated", and that reading the book makes one feel they took "a personal journey" in the historical era.

David J. Garrow of Homerton College, Cambridge University, described the book as "excellent", as well as "authoritative, perceptive, and well-written", citing how the author accomplished a "superb job of" explaining the developments, as well as "capturing the striking diversity of the later groups of Freedom Riders."

Stephen Goldfarb, in the magazine Alabama Heritage, stated that the book "should stand for many years as the definitive study of its subject."

Jim Hahn of Harper College's library, in Library Journal, wrote that the book is "justified" and was "deftly" written.

George Houser, in Fellowship magazine, wrote that the author "faithfully records" the historical events.

Moye wrote that the book is "excellent", as well as "passionate, dazzlingly well written", and that it "may very well be the best book yet written on the civil rights movement." According to Moye, much of the content about James Farmer relies on the man's memoirs, which Moye described as "self-serving and bombastic".

Lee E. Williams II of the University of Alabama in Huntsville wrote that book was "voluminous". He argued that the histories of the participants were "skillfully interwoven" in the book, and that the book is "a must-read" for people studying the topic.

Eugene Winkler, in The Christian Century described the book as "well-researched, provocative".

=== Abridged version ===
Reviewer Jo Manby stated that the abridged version "retains an encyclopedic quality." She stated that "At times the book reads like a written version of an action film or documentary".

== Adaptations ==
The film Freedom Riders was adapted from this book.

== See also ==
- The Children, 1999 book by David Halberstam focused on the Nashville Student Movement which continued the Freedom Rides after they were initially abandoned.
