= Sunshine Week =

- Date: The week containing March 16
- 2025 date: March 16–22
- 2026 date: March 15–21
- 2027 date: March 14–20
- 2028 date: March 12–18

Sunshine Week is a collaboration among groups in the journalism, civic, government, education and private sectors in the United States that focuses on the importance of public records. freedom of information and open government. It is based at the Joseph L. Brechner Freedom of Information Project at the University of Florida's College of Journalism and Communications.

In recognition of the 20th anniversary of national Sunshine Week, Sunshine Fest was held in Washington, D.C. March 19–20, 2025.

== Overview ==
Sunshine Week each year is the week that includes James Madison's birthday, which is March 16. It is the week that contains the third Friday of March.

During Sunshine Week, news organizations, civic and watchdog groups, libraries, nonprofits, schools and other participants engage public discussion on the importance of open government through news and feature articles and opinion columns; social media campaigns; infographics; editorial cartoons; public service advertising; public seminars and online or in-person forums. The purpose of the week is to highlight the fact that "government functions best when it operates in the open". In many states, however, legislatures exempt themselves from public-records laws, claiming "legislative immunity", and growing secrecy limits government accountability.

== History ==
The Florida Society of Newspaper Editors launched Sunshine Sunday in 2002 in response to efforts by some Florida legislators to create scores of new exemptions to the state's public records law. The following year, the idea of a national Sunshine Sunday was raised at an American Society of Newspaper Editors (ASNE) Freedom of Information summit.

In the planning stages, it was decided that the initiative needed to be more than a single Sunday. Thus, Sunshine Week was established in March 2005 by ASNE, with funding from the John S. and James L. Knight Foundation. The first nationwide Sunshine Week took place March 13–19, 2005.

In 2019, ASNE (now called the American Society of News Editors) and the Associated Press Media Editors merged to form the News Leaders Association (NLA). In the wake of the NLA's decision to dissolve, in December 2023 NLA placed Sunshine Week with the Brechner FOI Project.

== See also ==
- Freedom of information legislation
- Electronic Frontier Foundation
- Personally identifiable information (PII)
- Privacy laws of the United States
- Public Record Office
- General Register Office
