= Roy Peter Clark =

American writer, editor and writing coach (born 1948)

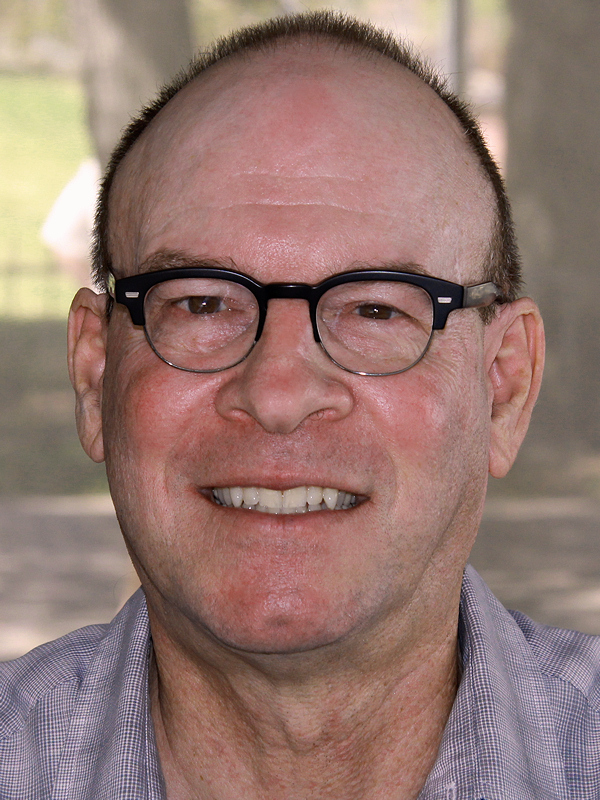
- Clark at the 2011 Texas Book Festival
- Born: 1948 (age 77–78); New York City, U.S.
- Education: Providence College, B.A. (1970); State University of New York at Stony Brook, PhD
- Occupations: Journalist; Teacher
- Years active: 1974–present
- Notable credit(s): Writing Tools; The Glamour of Grammar; Help! For Writers

Roy Peter Clark (born 1948) is an American writer, editor, and a writing coach. He is also senior scholar and vice president of the Poynter Institute for Media Studies, a journalism think tank in St. Petersburg, Florida, and the founder of the National Writers Workshop. Clark has appeared on several radio and television talk shows, speaking about journalism ethics and other writing issues.

== Early life and education ==
Clark is a native of the Lower East Side of New York City, and was raised on Long Island. His mother was of half-Italian and half-Jewish ancestry, and Clark was raised Catholic. Clark earned a degree in English (1970) from Providence College, Rhode Island, where he was editor of The Alembic, a literary journal, and managing editor of the student-run newspaper, The Cowl. Clark earned a Ph.D. in English, specializing in medieval literature, from the State University of New York at Stony Brook.

== Career ==
In 1974, Clark began teaching English at Auburn University at Montgomery, Alabama. Newspaper columns he wrote during that time attracted the attention of Eugene Patterson, editor of the St. Petersburg Times. Patterson hired Clark in 1977 as a reporter and to work with the newspaper's staff as a writing coach.

Since 1979, Clark has worked as a faculty member at the Poynter Institute, the non-profit organization that now owns Times Publishing Company, which publishes the St. Petersburg Times. Clark is listed as one of the Directors and Officers of The Poynter Institute. Andrea Pitzer, writing for the Nieman Foundation for Journalism at Harvard University, has called Clark “one of narrative journalism’s hardest working midwives.”

He has written the books Writing Tools: 50 Essential Strategies for Every Writer (Little, Brown and Company, 2006), The Glamour of Grammar: A Guide to the Magic and Mystery of Practical English (Little, Brown and Company, 2010), and Help! For Writers: 210 Solutions to the Problems Every Writer Faces (Little, Brown and Company, 2011).

On December 12, 2023, the Poynter Institute announced the creation of a new prize in honor of Clark called The Roy Peter Clark Award for Excellence in Short Writing.

== Works ==
=== Academic works ===
Clark wrote several articles based on Geoffrey Chaucer's The Canterbury Tales, some of which were published in The Chaucer Review, in which he discusses Chaucer's parodying of Church teachings and rituals. His PhD dissertation was titled "Chaucer and Medieval Scatology".

=== Journalism ===
As a journalist, Clark revitalized the serial article form when, in 1996, he wrote a 29-part serial narrative piece called "Three Little Words", which chronicled the story of one family's experience with AIDS. The article generated more than 8,000 phone calls to the newspaper.

Clark has also written and edited books about journalism, some of which are used as textbooks in college journalism courses, including Coaching Writers: Editors and Reporters Working Together (St. Martin's Press, 1991, with Don Fry), the second edition of which was titled Coaching Writers: Editors and Reporters Working Together across Media Platforms (Bedford-St. Martin's, 2003, with Don Fry), and Journalism: The Democratic Craft (Oxford University Press, 2005, with G. Stuart Adam).

=== On writing ===
Clark has taught writing to professional journalists, scholastic journalists (generally speaking, the student producers of high school and other student-run newspapers), and elementary school students.

In his book, Free to Write: A Journalist Teaches Young Writers (Heinemann, 1987/1995), and in other writing, Clark advocates putting the responsibility for correcting written work on the student rather than on the teacher.

Writing Tools: 50 Essential Strategies for Every Writer (Little, Brown and Company, 2006) grew out of a series of columns written for Poynter. Clark discusses the 50 tools, including the "clarity and narrative energy" (p. 12) that come with using right-branching sentences.

In The Glamour of Grammar: A Guide to the Magic and Mystery of Practical English (Little, Brown and Company, 2010), Clark traces the words 'glamour' and 'grammar' back to their common roots.

Clark also reports on how other writers write, as he did in a 2002 Poynter column about radio script writing, which he wrote after listening to a lecture by NPR reporter John Burnett.

== Radio and television appearances ==
Clark participated in a discussion on the January 26, 2006, episode of The Oprah Winfrey Show, "Journalists Speak Out." Clark, along with then New York Times columnist Frank Rich and Washington Post columnist Richard Cohen discussed the veracity of James Frey's memoir, A Million Little Pieces, which had been exposed by The Smoking Gun as being at least partially fictionalized.

== Selected bibliography ==
=== Books ===
- Clark, R. P., and Fry, D. (1991). Coaching Writers: Editors and Reporters Working Together. New York, NY: St. Martin's Press.
- Clark, R. P., and Fry, D. (2003). Coaching Writers: Editors and Reporters Working Together across Media Platforms (2nd Ed.). New York, NY: Bedford-St. Martin's.
- Adam, G. S., and Clark, R. P. (2005). Journalism: The Democratic Craft. New York, NY: Oxford University Press.
- Writing Tools: 50 Essential Strategies for Every Writer. New York: Little, Brown, 2006. Tenth anniversary edition: Writing Tools: 55 Essential Strategies for Every Writer. New York: Little, Brown, 2016.
- The Glamour of Grammar: A Guide to the Magic and Mystery of Practical English. New York: Little, Brown, 2010.
- Help! For Writers: 210 Solutions to the Problems Every Writer Faces. New York: Little, Brown, 2011.
- How to Write Short: Word Craft for Fast Times. New York: Little, Brown, 2013.
- The Art of X-Ray Reading: How the Secrets of 25 Great Works of Literature Will Improve Your Writing. New York: Little, Brown, 2016.
- Murder Your Darlings: And other gentle writing advice from Aristotle to Zinsser. New York: Little, Brown, 2020.
- Tell It Like It Is: A Guide to Clear and Honest Writing. New York: Little, Brown, 2023.
- Writing Tools For The College Admissions Essay: Write Your Way into the School of Your Dreams. New York: Little, Brown, 2025.

=== Academic articles ===
- Clark, R. P. (1976). Christmas Games in Chaucer's The Miller's Tale. Studies in Short Fiction, 13(3), 277.
- Clark, R. P. (Fall, 1976). Doubting Thomas in Chaucer's Summoner's Tale. The Chaucer Review, 11(2), 164–178. JSTOR 25093381

=== Newspaper articles ===
- Clark, R. P. (1996) Sadie's Ring. Originally published in the Charlotte (N.C.) Observer and the Miami Herald.
- Clark, R. P. (February, 1996). Three Little Words. Originally published in The St. Petersburg Times.
