= James L. Knight =

American newspaper publisher (1909–1991)

James Landon Knight
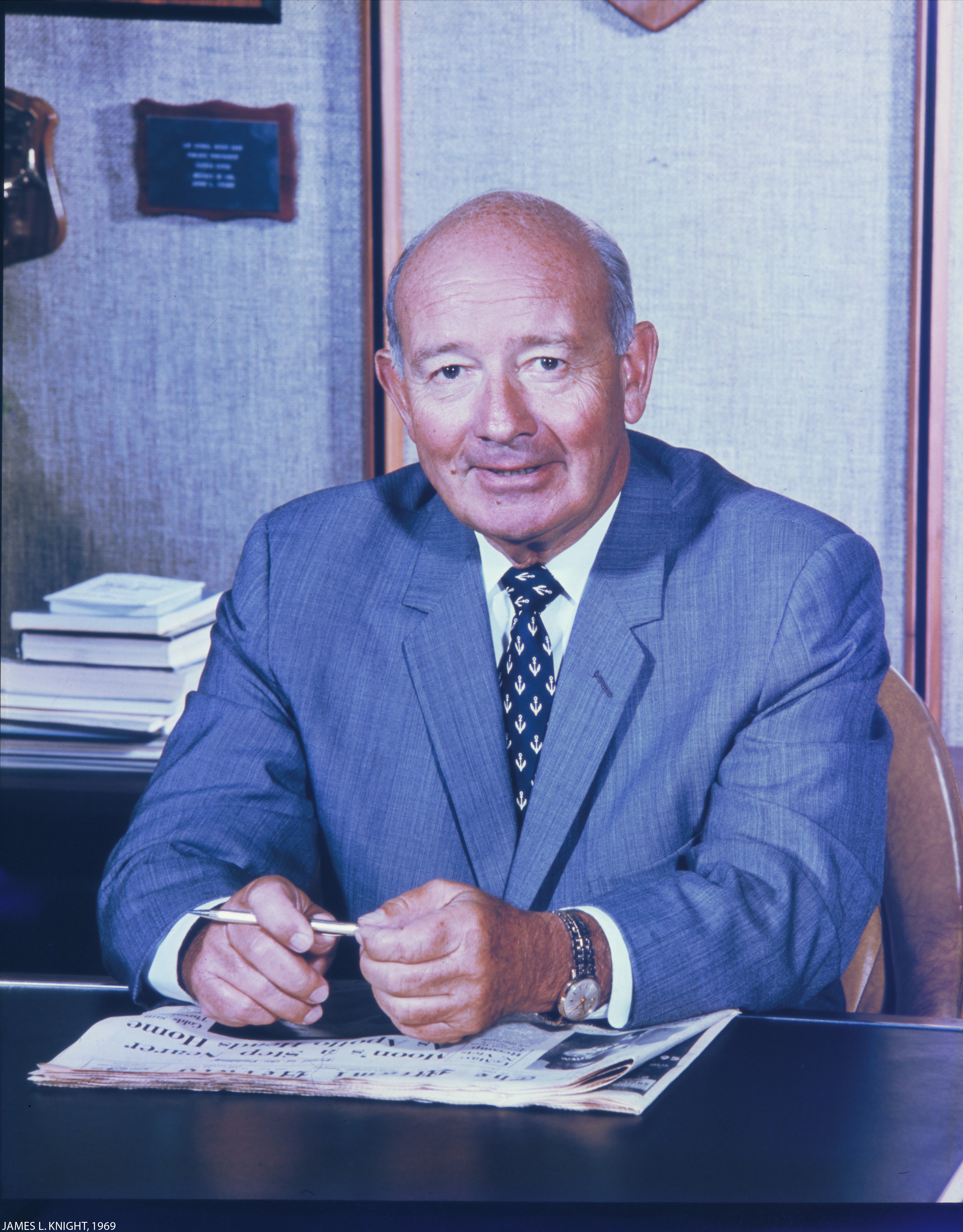
- Knight in 1969
- Born: July 21, 1909; Akron, Ohio
- Died: February 5, 1991 (aged 81); Santa Monica, California
- Known for: Knight Ridder newspapers, John S. and James L. Knight Foundation
- Spouses: Mary Ann Mather (1911-1985); Barbara Richardson (married 1986)
- Children: 4
- Parent(s): Charles Landon Knight; Clara Irene Shively
- Relatives: John S. Knight (brother)

James Landon Knight (July 21, 1909 – February 5, 1991) was an American newspaper publisher and co-founder of the Knight Ridder group of newspapers.

He was also co-founder of the John S. and James L. Knight Foundation with his brother John S. Knight.

The James L. Knight Center in Miami, Florida is named in his honor.

He caught a then-record 585-pound blue marlin in 1964 on a fishing trip that saw the sinking of the family's 75-foot pleasure boat.
