= C. L. Knight =

American newspaper publisher and politician

C.L. Knight
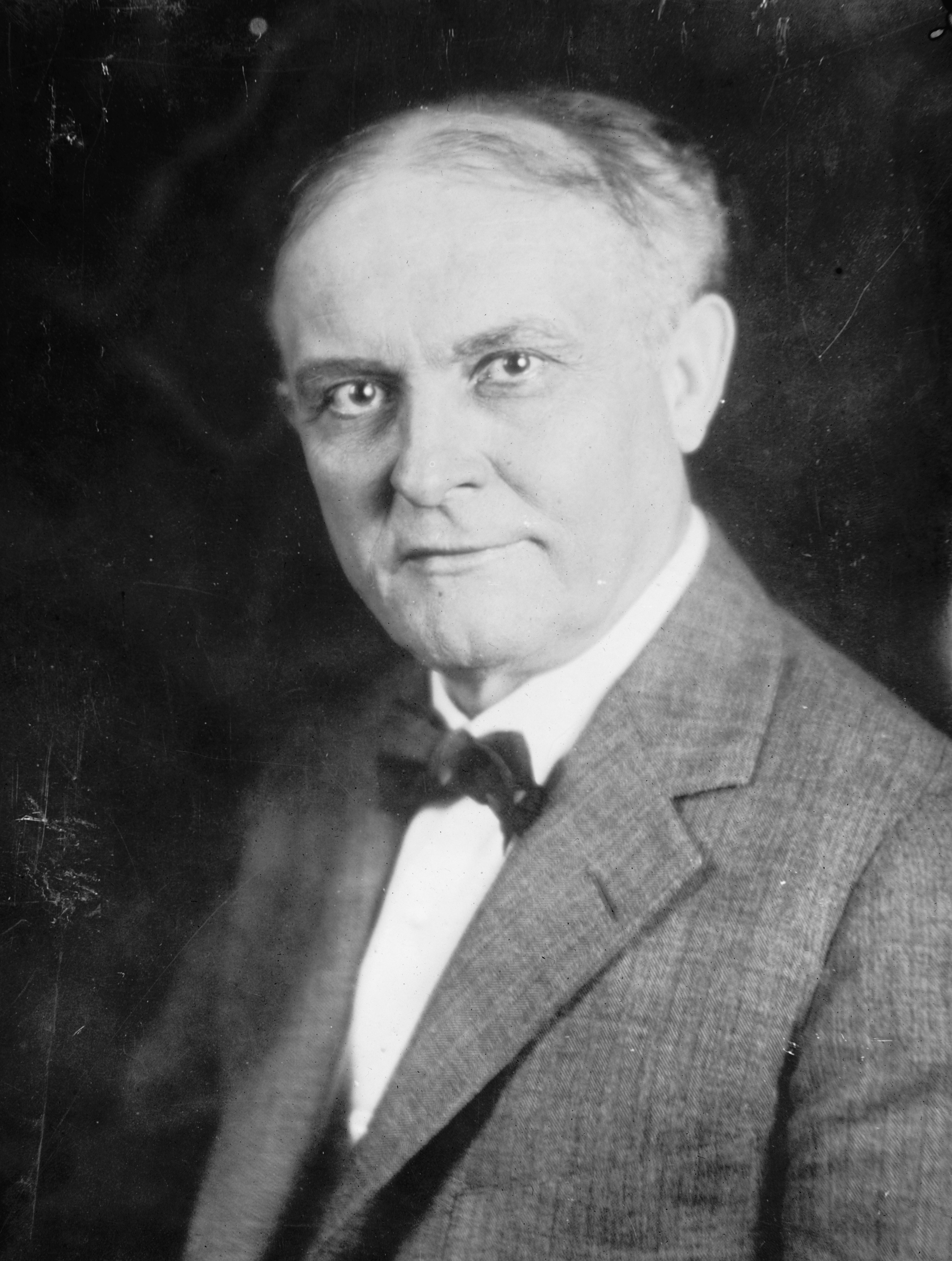

Member of the U.S. House of Representatives from Ohio's 14th district
- In office March 4, 1921 – March 3, 1923
- Preceded by: Martin L. Davey
- Succeeded by: Martin L. Davey

Personal details
- Born: Charles Landon Knight; June 18, 1867 Milledgeville, Georgia
- Died: September 26, 1933 (aged 66) Akron, Ohio
- Resting place: Rose Hill Burial Park
- Party: Republican
- Spouse: Clara Irene Shively
- Children: John Shively Knight; James Landon Knight
- Education: Vanderbilt University; Columbia University Law School
- Profession: newspaper publisher
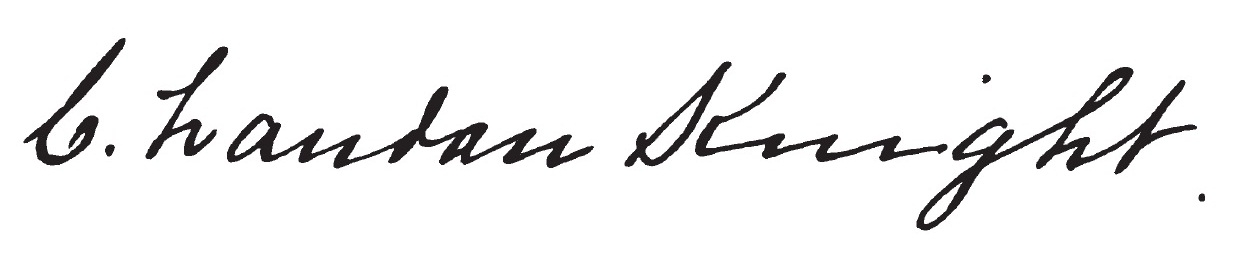
- Signature

Charles Landon Knight (June 18, 1867 – September 26, 1933) was an American lawyer and newspaper publisher who represented Ohio in the United States House of Representatives for one term from 1921 to 1923. His sons built his newspaper business into what would become Knight Ridder.

== Early life ==
Born near Milledgeville, Georgia, "C.L." graduated from Vanderbilt University in 1889 and from Columbia University Law School in 1890. He was admitted to the bar in 1892 and commenced practice at Bluefield, West Virginia.

== Journalism and politics ==
Knight joined the Philadelphia Times in 1896 and remained until 1900. In 1903, Knight purchased the Akron Beacon Journal in Akron, Ohio.

According to his obituary in The New York Times, "Mr. Knight was well known for his opposition to the Taft nomination in 1912, the election of Woodrow Wilson, America's entry into the World War, the country's proposed membership in the League of Nations and prohibition."

He was a delegate to the Republican National Convention from Ohio in 1916 and 1924. He was the Representative from Ohio 14th District, from 1921 to 1923.

In 1922, Knight ran unsuccessfully for Governor of Ohio.

== Legacy ==
Knight died in 1933 and is buried in Akron, Ohio. His son, John S. Knight inherited the Beacon Journal in 1933; with his brother James L. Knight, the two expanded their media holdings significantly. To honor the memory of their father, the brothers established the Knight Memorial Education Fund in 1940 to provide financial aid to college students from the Akron area. The fund existed until December 1950 when its assets of $9,047 were transferred to the newly created Knight Foundation. John S. and James L. Knight Foundation, "dedicated to promotion of journalistic causes".

== Family ==
Knight married Clara Irene Shively of Shenandoah, Pennsylvania on November 22, 1893. They had two sons, John Shively Knight and James Landon Knight.

U.S. House of Representatives
Preceded by Martin L. Davey	Member of the U.S. House of Representatives from Ohio's 14th congressional district 1921-1923	Succeeded by Martin L. Davey
