= John C. Quinn =

American journalist

John Collins Quinn
- Born: October 24, 1925; Providence, Rhode Island
- Died: July 11, 2017 (aged 91); North Kingstown, Rhode Island
- Resting place: White Brook Cemetery, Richmond, Rhode Island
- Education: Providence College; Columbia University
- Occupation: Journalist
- Years active: 1943–1990
- Employer: Gannett Company
- Known for: Editor-in-chief for USA Today, President of the American Society of Newspaper Editors and the Associated Press Managing Editors Edition
- Spouse: Lois Richardson Quinn (d. 2005)
- Children: 4
- Awards: Rhode Island Heritage Hall of Fame, 1975; Rhode Island Journalism Hall of Fame, 1990; NABJ Ida B. Wells Award, 1992

John Collins Quinn (24 October 1925 – 11 July 2017) was an American journalist and the former president of Gannett Company, and former editor-in-chief of USA Today.

== Personal ==
Quinn was born on October 24, 1925, in Providence, Rhode Island, to Kathryn and John A. Quinn. He attended Classical High School in Providence and graduated in 1942. He graduated magna cum laude from Providence College in 1945, and earned his master's degree from the Columbia University School of Journalism in 1946. He married his wife, Lois Richardson, in 1953, and remained married until she died in 2005. The couple had 3 sons, John C. "Chips" Quinn Jr., Richard Burnham "RB" Quinn, and Christopher A. "Kiffer" Quinn, and a daughter, Lo-Anne Quinn. Chips died in 1990 in a car crash, and the Chips Quinn Scholars Program, created by the Quinns to offer journalism students scholarships, training, and internships, was named in his honor. Kiffer died in 2014 due to an illness.

== Career ==
While at Providence College, Quinn worked at the Providence Journal Bulletin, starting out as a copy boy. By the time he left the Bulletin in 1966 to join Gannett, he had worked his way up to being the managing editor. Quinn started his tenure with Gannett as executive editor of two Rochester, New York newspapers, the Democrat and Chronicle and the Times-Union, until becoming an editor for USA Today when it was founded in 1982. Quinn served as an editor for USA Today until 1988, when he became editor-in-chief. During his time with Gannett, he was the President of Gannett News Service and vice president of news for Gannett Company. Among Quinn's many other endeavors as a journalist, he was president of the Associated Press Managing Editors from 1972 to 1973, and also the president of the American Society of Newspaper Editors from 1982 to 1983 Quinn retired from Gannett in 1990, 47 years to the day he started working for the Journal Bulletin. Quinn was inducted into the Rhode Island Journalism Hall of Fame a month after his retirement. Following Gannett, he became a chairman for the Freedom Fourm.

== Legacy ==
In 1980, while president of Gannett News Service, the company won the Pulitzer Prize Gold Medal for Public Service.

Quinn believed that "there is no lessening in diversity." Following his son's death in 1990, Quinn and his wife founded the Chips Quinn Scholars Program. This program offers scholarships, internships, and training to college journalism students of color. Since the program's launch in 1991, there have been more than 1,300 scholarship winners, many of them working at major newspapers. According to a Chips Quinn Scholar, Quinn said that "journalism is the most fun you could have with your clothes on."

Quinn had a lasting impact on many editors throughout the country. According to former Courier-Journal editor Bennie Ivory, Quinn was "the conscience of Gannett for many years, having inspired the most aggressive diversity movement of the 20th century." According to former Detroit News publisher Mark Silverman, Quinn was "clearly one of the most influential and innovative journalists of his generation. He was a true champion of diversity, an articulate voice for quality journalism, and a friend of everyone he recruited or mentored. In a company always racing into the future, John was the voice of quality and of doing the right thing."

== Death ==
John C. Quinn died on July 11, 2017, at Roberts Health Center in North Kingstown, Rhode Island at the age of 91. His health had been "failing for some time" and he died of natural causes.

== Awards ==
- Rhode Island Heritage Hall of Fame (1975)
- National Press Foundation Editor of the Year (1986)
- Women in Communications Headliner Award (1986)
- William Allen White Foundation Award for Journalistic Merit (1987)
- Paul Miller/Oklahoma State University Medallion (1988)
- Rhode Island Journalism Hall of Fame (1990)
- NABJ Ida B. Wells Award (1992)

== See also ==
- National Association of Black Journalists Hall of Fame
