= Poynter Institute =

Non-profit journalism school in St. Petersburg, Florida

- Former name: Modern Media Institute
- Motto: Democracy needs journalism. Journalism needs Poynter.
- Type: School of journalism
- Established: May 29, 1975
- President: Neil Brown
- Location: St. Petersburg, Florida, U.S.
- Website: www.poynter.org

The Poynter Institute for Media Studies is a nonprofit journalism school and research organization in St. Petersburg, Florida, United States. The school is the owner of the Tampa Bay Times newspaper and the International Fact-Checking Network. It also operates the fact-checking website PolitiFact.

== History ==
=== Foundation ===
The school began on May 29, 1975, when Nelson Poynter, the owner and chairman of the St. Petersburg Times (now the Tampa Bay Times) and Times Publishing Company, announced that he planned to start a small journalism school called the Modern Media Institute. In 1977, Poynter willed ownership of the Times Publishing Company to the Institute so that after his death the school would become the owner of the St. Petersburg Times. The name of the school was changed to the Poynter Institute in 1984.

=== Expansion and development ===
Craig Newmark (founder of Craigslist) is a board member of the Poynter Foundation and donated $1 million to it in 2015. In 2018, the Poynter Institute began a cooperation with the content recommendation network Revcontent, to stop misinformation and fake news in articles supplying Revcontent with fact-checking provided by their International Fact-Checking Network. On January 11, 2018, the Charles Koch Foundation's Director of Free Expression, Sarah Ruger, stated in an American Society of News Editors news release that "The foundation supports many grantees committed to press freedom, including The Poynter Institute, the Newseum and Techdirt's free speech initiative." On February 12, 2018, the Tampa Bay Times, the for-profit branch of the nonprofit Poynter Institute, spun off the Pulitzer Prize-winning PolitiFact website to form an independent division within Poynter.

Since 2019, The Washington Post has been partnering with the Poynter Institute to increase diversity in media, with the goal to expand Poynter's annual Leadership Academy for Diversity in Digital Media training journalists to become founders, top-level executives and innovators. Other sponsors are CNN, the Scripps Howard Foundations, Craig Newmark Philanthropies, the Ethics and Excellence in Journalism Foundation and TEGNA Foundation.

Poynter published a list of over 515 news websites that it labeled "unreliable" in 2019. The author of the piece used various fake news databases (including those curated by the Annenberg Public Policy Center, Merrimack College, PolitiFact, and Snopes) to compile the list and called on advertisers to "blacklist" the included sites. The list included conservative news websites such as the Washington Examiner, The Washington Free Beacon, and The Daily Signal as well as conspiracy outfits including InfoWars. After backlash from both readers of and contributors to some of the included publications, Poynter retracted the list, citing "weaknesses in the methodology". Poynter issued a statement, saying: "[w]e regret that we failed to ensure that the data was rigorous before publication, and apologize for the confusion and agitation caused by its publication." Reason pointed out that the author was a freelancer hired by the Institute who typically works for the Southern Poverty Law Center (SPLC). Reason drew parallels between the accuracy of the list with SPLC's own work on hate groups.

=== Election integrity and COVID-19 ===
In 2020, after receiving funding from Facebook, the Poynter Institute expanded the MediaWise program with a national media literacy program called MediaWise Voter project (#MVP). Its goal was to reach two million American college students who were first-time voters, helping them to be better prepared and informed for the 2020 United States elections. Poynter received $737,400 in federal loans from the Paycheck Protection Program during the COVID-19 pandemic. President Neil Brown said that this was not the first time the institute received government funding, citing past training contracts with Voice of America.

== Activities ==
=== International Fact-Checking Network ===
Logo of the International Fact-Checking Network

In 2015, the institute launched the International Fact-Checking Network (IFCN), which sets a code of ethics for fact-checking organizations. The IFCN reviews fact-checkers for compliance with its code, and issues a certification to publishers who pass the audit. The certification lasts for one year, and fact-checkers must be re-examined annually to retain their certifications. Facebook has used the IFCN's certification to vet publishers for fact-checking contracts.

As of 2026, the IFCN's Code of Principles had more than 170 verified signatories in over 80 countries, and Angie Drobnic Holan served as the network's director.

In 2025, Facebook parent company Meta announced it would move away from using IFCN-certified fact checkers, and replace with "community notes", similar to what is done on the X social network. Membership has also been used to identify the reliability of a fact-checking organization. DW called it the most prominent fact-checking consortium. The IFCN and the American Press Institute jointly publish Factually, a newsletter on fact-checking and journalism ethics. The IFCN also organizes Global Fact, a yearly conference on fact checking.

=== News University ===
News University (NewsU) is a project of the Poynter Institute that offers journalism training through methods including e-learning courses, webinars, and learning games. NewsU is funded by the John S. and James L. Knight Foundation.

=== Awards ===
In 2023, the News Leaders Association transferred stewardship of the NLA Awards to the Poynter Institute, who will administer the contest from 2024 onward, and the awards were renamed to the Poynter Journalism Prizes. That same year, Poynter announced the creation of a new prize in honor of Roy Peter Clark called the Roy Peter Clark Award for Excellence in Short Writing.

==== Poynter Medal ====
Since 2015, the Poynter Medal for Lifetime Achievement in Journalism has been awarded by the Poynter Institute, recognizing journalistic relevance, ethics, and impact. Past winners include:

- 2015: Bob Schieffer, former CBS News anchor and host of Face the Nation
- 2016: Tom Brokaw, former anchor of NBC Nightly News
- 2017: Judy Woodruff, anchor and managing editor of PBS NewsHour
- 2018: Lester Holt, anchor of NBC Nightly News and Dateline NBC
- 2019: Katie Couric, broadcast journalist, author and media entrepreneur
- 2020: Chris Wallace, anchor of Fox News Sunday
- 2021: Lesley Stahl, correspondent for CBS News' 60 Minutes
- 2022: Bob Woodward and Carl Bernstein, investigative journalists
- 2023: Anderson Cooper, broadcast journalist and political commentator for CNN
- 2024: Robin Roberts, co-anchor of ABC's Good Morning America
- 2025: Jane Pauley, host of CBS Sunday Morning

== See also ==
- Donald K. Fry
- Kelly McBride
