= John S. Knight =

American newspaper publisher

John Shively Knight
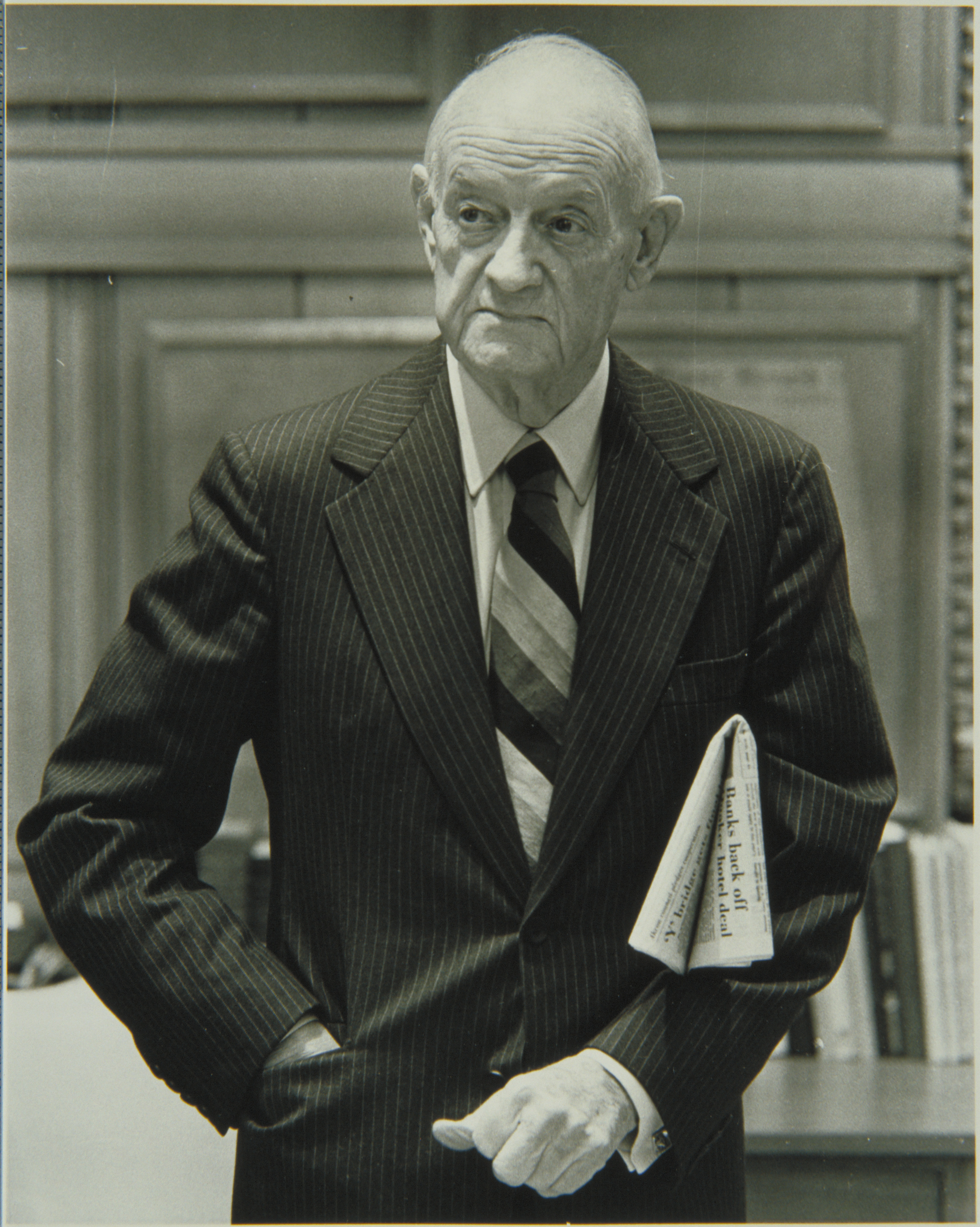
- Born: October 26, 1894; Bluefield, West Virginia, US
- Died: June 16, 1981 (aged 86); Akron, Ohio, US
- Education: Cornell University
- Occupations: Newspaper publisher & editor
- Known for: Co-founder of Knight Ridder newspapers & Co-Founder of John S. and James L. Knight Foundation
- Board member of: Knight Ridder, American Society of Newspaper Editors, Associated Press
- Spouses: Katherine "Kitty" McLain (married 1921 – d. 1929); Beryl Zoller Comstock (married 1932 – d. 1974); Elizabeth "Betty" Good Augustus (m. 1976 – d. 1981)
- Children: John Shively, Jr. (KIA 1945); Charles Landon II (1924–2000); Frank McLain (d. 1958)
- Parent(s): Charles Landon Knight; Clara Irene Shively
- Awards: Pulitzer Prize for editorial writing (1968); Elijah Parish Lovejoy Award (1969); John Peter Zenger Award; William Allen White Foundation Award; National Press Award; Poor Richard Gold Medal of Achievement Award

John Shively Knight (October 26, 1894 – June 16, 1981) was an American newspaper publisher and editor based in Akron, Ohio.

== Early life and education ==
Knight was born in Bluefield, West Virginia, to Charles Landon Knight and Clara Irene Shively. Known to his family and friends as "Jack," he attended Cornell University but never graduated, leaving early to enlist in the Army. While at Cornell he was a member of the Phi Sigma Kappa fraternity. However, he later received the degree of "War Alumnus."

== Military career ==
After enlisting, Knight would undergo basic training at Fort Crook, Nebraska. Originally assigned as a company clerk, he was transferred to motor transport and underwent training in Indianapolis. In December 1917, he would travel to Halifax, Nova Scotia to board a ship that would take him and his unit to Le Havre, France arriving January 7, 1918.

As a truckmaster sergeant, he convoyed supplies to support the First and 26th divisions. Knight enrolled in Infantry Training School, where he was accepted as an officer candidate. He was commissioned as a second lieutenant on July 9, and assigned to the 113th Infantry Regiment of the 29th Division. Knight joined the division on its patrols, and between August 31 and September 7 would conduct raids and capture prisoners.

Knight would be transferred for Air Service training before the end of September. He trained as a gunner, remaining in France until May 1919.

He returned to his home in Akron on June 27, 1919.

== Career ==
In 1920 he started at his father's newspaper, The Akron Beacon Journal, as sportswriter, and moved up to managing editor before inheriting the paper in 1933. In 1923, Knight served as the fourth president of the Akron Host Lions Club. Beginning a nationwide expansion, Knight bought the Miami Herald in 1937. His national Knight Newspapers chain, headquartered in Akron, eventually also included the Philadelphia Inquirer, Chicago Daily News, Charlotte Observer, Tallahassee Democrat, Lexington Herald and Leader, and Macon Telegraph.

In 1940, in honor of their father Charles Landon Knight, John, along with his brother James L. Knight established the Knight Educational Memorial Fund. It provided financial aid to college students in Akron, Ohio. The fund operated until 1950 when its assets were transferred to the newly organized Knight Foundation. It continued providing financial aid to students, as well as made small grants to local institutions.

During the latter part of World War II, Knight took a leave from the newspaper business, serving as Director of the U.S. Office of Censorship, in London.

By 1973, his portfolio included fifteen newspapers. A year later, 1974, he merged his company with Ridder Publications to form Knight-Ridder Newspapers Inc.

== Honors and awards ==
- His nationwide column, "The Editor's Notebook," won him the 1968 Pulitzer Prize for editorial writing.
- In 1969 Knight received the Elijah Parish Lovejoy Award as well as an honorary Doctor of Laws degree from Colby College.

== Personal life ==
John Knight lost first his wife, Katherine, and then two of three sons at early ages. Lieutenant John S. Knight, Jr. was killed in action near Münster, Germany on March 29, 1945. Youngest son Frank McLain Knight died at age thirty on March 9, 1958 following emergency brain surgery.

In retirement, John Knight devoted much of his time to the raising of Thoroughbred race horses at his Fourth Estate Stable based in Miami.

Knight died of a heart attack in Akron.

== Dedications ==
- The John S. Knight Auditorium is a large lecture hall in Leigh Hall, a building on the campus of the University of Akron.
- The John S. Knight Reading Room is located in Bierce Library, a building on the campus of the University of Akron.
- The John S. Knight Center is a large convention center in downtown Akron.
- The John S. Knight Institute for Writing in the Disciplines at Cornell University.
- The John S. Knight Journalism Fellowships at Stanford support journalists from around the world in exploring solutions to issues facing innovation, entrepreneurship and leadership in journalism, thanks to a $4 million grant from the John S. and James L. Knight Foundation in 1984.
