= The Incline =

Online newspaper

- Screenshot of The Incline (May 2019)
- Company type: Private
- Website type: News
- Available in: English
- Founded: September 13, 2016; 10 years ago
- Headquarters: Pittsburgh, Pennsylvania, U.S.
- Area served: Pittsburgh
- Owner: WhereBy.Us
- Key people: Colin Williams (Local director)
- Industry: Internet, media
- Website: theincline.com
- Advertising: None
- Registration: None
- Current status: Inactive

The Incline was an online newspaper focused on the Pittsburgh, Pennsylvania region. Launched in 2016, the news outlet curated syndicated content and produced original stories aimed towards millennials. Instead of ads, The Incline's revenue came from events. The best known of which was their "Who's next" event series. In March 2019, The Incline was acquired by WhereBy.Us. In June 2023, the Incline ceased all operations.

== History ==
Spirited Media founded Philadelphia's web-only local news site Billy Penn in 2014. Billy Penn functions as a mixture of links to news articles produced by other outlets with its original reporting mixed in. Rather than direct ad sales, Billy Penn found success with an event-based business model. Spirited Media looked for new cities to deploy it in. In 2016, Pittsburgh was identified as the second city after major investments came from Gannett. The Incline deviated from Billy Penn, by selling ads upon its introduction in order to gain exposure and awareness.

The Incline was launched in September 2016. The news outlet was named after the Duquesne Incline. Because of the presence of Silicon Valley companies working with Carnegie Mellon University and the absence of a tech business website in Pittsburgh, the Incline focused more on technology news compared to its Philadelphia counterpart. The Incline was also experimented on curation of news based on the moods of their readers.

== Awards and recognition ==
The Incline won the award for the “Biggest blockbuster story” at Hearken's 2018 Champions of Curiosity Awards. The Incline obtained recognition in multiple categories from the Press Club of Western Pennsylvania at the 54th Golden Quill Awards. The Incline won an award from the 30th Anniversary Vann Media Awards for their coverage of business news.
