= Al Día (Dallas) =

Newspaper in Dallas, Texas, US

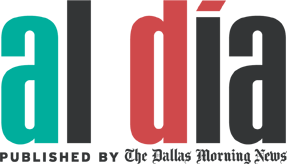
- Type: Daily newspaper
- Format: Broadsheet
- Owner: Hearst Communications
- Editor: Alfredo Carbajal
- Founded: September 29, 2003
- Language: Spanish
- Headquarters: Dallas, TX; United States
- Website: www.dallasnews.com/espanol/al-dia/

Al Día is a general information Spanish language news medium that serves the Dallas/Fort Worth Metroplex. Al Día publishes daily on aldiadallas.com, and once-a-week (Wednesday) print edition. It is published by Hearst Communications and is a sister publication of The Dallas Morning News. It has its headquarters in Downtown Dallas.

== Awards ==
Al Día has received several awards from the NAHP, NAHJ and Texas-APME.

== Online ==
Al Día publishes news stories on Facebook, Twitter and Instagram. It also publishes newsletters every week. Al Día also publishes an ePaper edition every Wednesday.

== See also ==
- El Día
- El Nuevo Herald
- La Opinión
- La Voz de Houston
