= Ivor Shapiro =

Canadian journalism scholar

Ivor Shapiro is a Canadian journalism scholar, author, and former magazine editor. He is former chair of the School of Journalism at Toronto Metropolitan University (TMU) and a research fellow at the Department of Journalism of Stellenbosch University. His work has focused on journalism ethics, press freedom, and the professional identity of journalists.

== Early life and education ==
Shapiro was born in Benoni, South Africa, to Max and Queenie Shapiro. He studied theology at the University of South Africa and completed a master’s degree in religious studies (ethics) at the University of Cape Town. He began freelance journalism as a teenager, publishing in the Cape Argus and later working as editor of the Anglican Church’s monthly paper, which often reported on the effects of apartheid.

He emigrated to Canada in 1985, later becoming a dual citizen.

== Career ==
=== Journalism career ===
In Canada, Shapiro was contributing editor of Saturday Night magazine and wrote for Toronto Life, Maclean’s, The Walrus, Today’s Parent, and The Globe and Mail’s Report on Business Magazine. He served as managing editor of Chatelaine and later worked as a freelance writer and publishing consultant.

His first book, What God Allows: The Crisis of Faith and Conscience in One Catholic Church (Doubleday, 1996), was a work of literary journalism on faith and conflict among Catholics in the United States.

Between 1989 and 2004 he received six National Magazine Awards and was a finalist for a Canadian Association of Journalists award for investigative journalism.

=== Academic career ===
Shapiro joined TMU (then Ryerson University) in 2001, teaching feature reporting, ethics, and media law. He was chair of the School of Journalism from 2011 to 2016 and served as associate dean for undergraduate education in the Faculty of Communication and Design from 2017 to 2019.

He was the founding editor of J-Source (2007–2009), Canada’s journalism research and commentary site, and chaired the ethics advisory committee of the Canadian Association of Journalists from 2009 to 2016.

After retiring as full professor, he became senior fellow at the Centre for Free Expression at TMU and research fellow in the Department of Journalism at Stellenbosch University. He has been involved in the international Worlds of Journalism Study and leads an international study of “essential standards” for news reporting, housed at the Centre d’études sur les médias at Laval University.

== Research and scholarship ==
Shapiro’s scholarly work examines journalists’ professional values, definitions of journalism, and accountability in democratic societies. His research has appeared in Journalism Studies, Journalism Practice, Canadian Journal of Communication, Newspaper Research Journal, Digital Journalism, and Canadian Journal of Political Science. He is also an editorial board member of Journalism Studies.

Shapiro is the author of The Disputed Freedoms of a Disrupted Press (Routledge, 2024), which explores challenges to press freedom in the digital age. His edited volume The Bigger Picture: Elements of Feature Writing (2003) is used in journalism education.

=== Views and opinions ===
Shapiro has written on journalism ethics, press freedom, and the role of free expression in democratic societies. In his Dangerous Dialogues blog, he argued that meaningful public discourse requires tolerating speech that may offend, provided it does not cross into incitement of hatred, and emphasized the importance of listening across political and social divides. He linked his perspective to his experiences in apartheid South Africa, including encounters with activists such as Steve Biko, and to contemporary debates over free expression in Canada and elsewhere.

In a 2023 essay How Journalists Can Win People Back for The Walrus, Shapiro contended that journalism’s credibility crisis stems less from individual failures than from structural pressures undermining professional standards.

He notes the importance of moving beyond accusations that media is uniformly biased or compromised, toward recognizing variance in performance among media outlets. Some are doing careful, accurate work even in difficult circumstances.

Writing for MediaPolicy in 2024, he cautioned that declining trust in journalism cannot be solved by technological fixes alone but requires renewed attention to professional identity, ethics, and editorial independence.

For the Centre for Free Expression, he has further maintained that journalism education must balance technical skills with moral and civic responsibilities, arguing that a focus on “essential standards” of reporting is key to sustaining democracy.
