= Eugene Patterson =

American journalist and civil rights activist

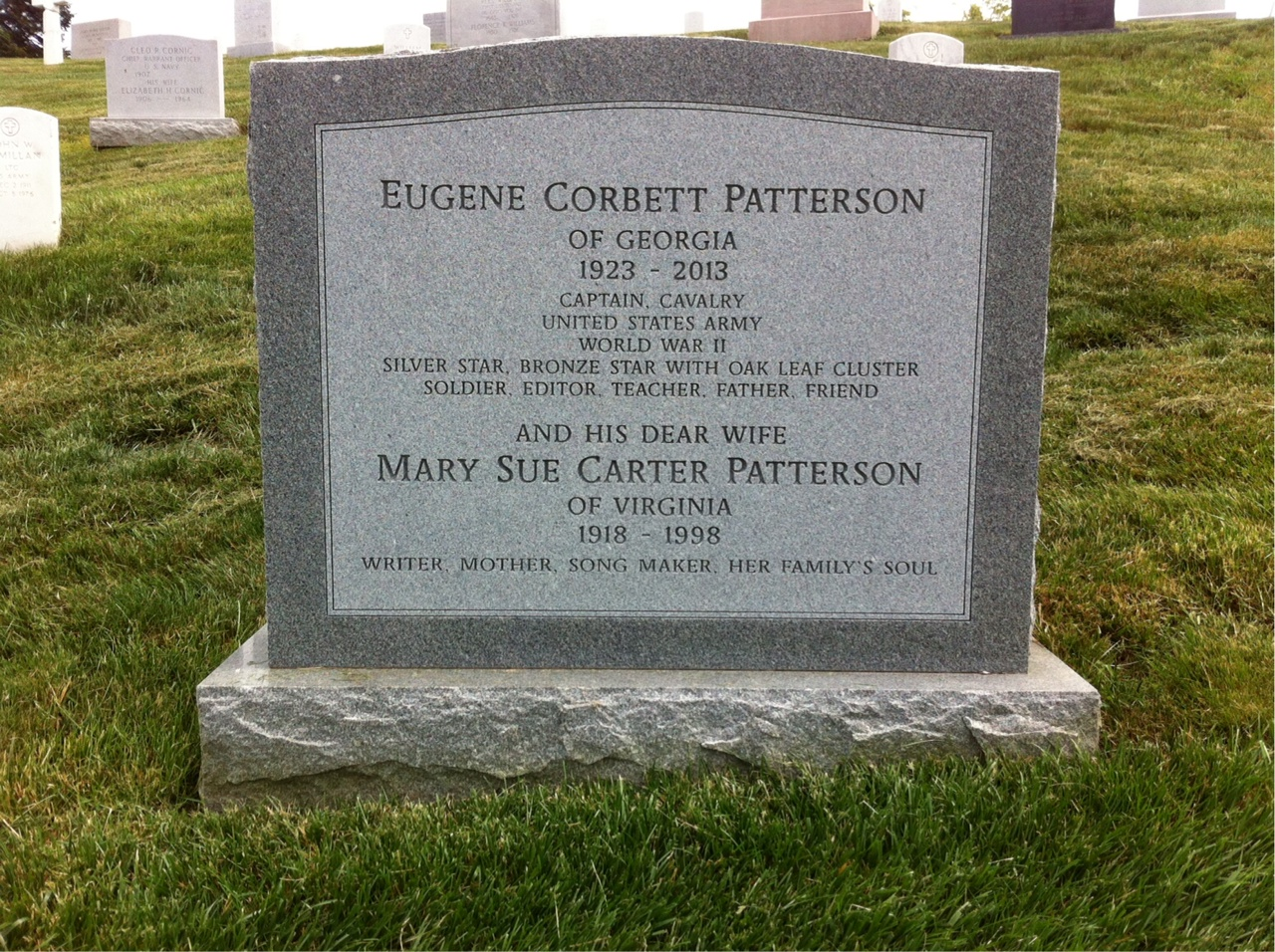
Grave at Arlington National Cemetery

Eugene Corbett Patterson (October 15, 1923 – January 12, 2013), sometimes known as Gene Patterson, was an American journalist and civil rights activist. He was awarded the 1967 Pulitzer Prize for Editorial Writing.

== Early life ==
Patterson was born in Valdosta, Georgia, the son of Annabel Corbett, a schoolteacher, and William C. Patterson, a bank cashier. After the bank at which his father worked was closed in the course of the Great Depression, the family moved to a small farm near Adel, Georgia. The house had no running water or electricity, and was heated only by the fireplace. With his father able to get only occasional employment at local banks, the family was primarily supported by his mother's work as a teacher and her running the farm.

As a teenager, Patterson began to work on weekends at the local journal, the Adel News. He edited a campus newspaper at North Georgia College at Dahlonega, Georgia where he studied for his freshman year. He graduated with a journalism degree from the University of Georgia in 1943. After graduation, he served as a tank commander in the United States Army General George Patton's 10th Armored Division, 90th Cavalry Reconnaissance Squadron, First Platoon, C Troop during World War II and won a Silver Star for gallantry in action at the Battle of the Bulge and a Bronze Star with oak leaf cluster for heroic achievement. The 10th Armored, CCB at Bastogne, held off the German Army onslaught for eight hours awaiting the arrival of the 101st Airborne Division to fully stop the offensive. He served as an Army pilot after the war until he left the military to pursue journalism in 1947.

== Journalism career ==
Patterson's first jobs were with the Temple Daily Telegram and the Macon Telegraph. After working for United Press from 1948 to 1956, he was appointed vice president and executive editor of the joint journals, the Atlanta Journal and the Constitution, both now merged into the Atlanta Journal-Constitution.

Patterson wrote a signed newspaper editorial every day for eight years. An editorial he wrote in 1963, A Flower for the Graves, was considered so moving that he was asked to read it on live television by Walter Cronkite, the leading news anchorman of the era. The editorial was in response to the notorious church bombing in Birmingham, Alabama which killed four black girls, all under the age of 15. He was once approached by the FBI, who wanted him to write an article about Martin Luther King Jr.'s alleged infidelities which they had uncovered through wiretaps. Patterson told them "We're not a peephole journal. We don't print that kind of stuff."

Patterson was appointed managing editor of The Washington Post in 1968. After the Nixon administration had blocked The New York Times from the continued publication of the Pentagon Papers, which revealed how President Lyndon Johnson had withheld information about the progress of the nation's waging of the Vietnam War from the United States Congress, he was responsible for the Post's publication of the documents.

After teaching at Duke University in the 1971 school semester, he was president of the Times Publishing Company and appointed editor of the St. Petersburg Times, now the Tampa Bay Times, which reached the top ten of major American newspapers during his tenure, the former St. Petersburg Evening Independent, and the Congressional Quarterly.

Patterson later became president of the American Society of Newspaper Editors. He was also known for his strong stand on ethics, even where it concerned himself. After being charged with driving while intoxicated, he told his staff to cover the story on the first page. That way he could tell anyone "I put myself on Page 1, so you can't ask me not to put you there". He took a strong stand opposing the execution of John Spenkelink in 1979. He even called the Governor of Florida, Bob Graham, at 2 A.M., with a personal appeal to commute the sentence. To his disappointment, despite this, it was carried out, the first in Florida in 15 years. In 2002, historian Raymond Arsenault published a biography and analysis of Patterson's impact. Patterson was a 2010 inductee into the International Civil Rights Walk of Fame.

In 1966, he received an honorary degree in Doctor of Letters from Oglethorpe University. In 1968, he received the Golden Plate Award of the American Academy of Achievement.

== Death ==
Patterson died in 2013 after a series of treatments for cancer. His remains were interred at Arlington National Cemetery.
