= Right-branching sentences in English =

In English grammar, a right-branching sentence is a sentence in which the main subject of the sentence is described first, and is followed by a sequence of modifiers that provide additional information about the subject. The inverse would be a Left-branching sentence. The name "right-branching" comes from the English syntax of putting such modifiers to the right of the sentence. For example, the following sentence is right-branching.

The dog slept on the doorstep of the house in which it lived.

Note that the sentence begins with the subject, followed by a verb, and then the object of the verb. This is then followed by a modifier that more closely defines the object, and this modifier is itself modified by a subsequent modifier.

Right-branching sentences are generally held to be easier to read than other similarly-complex grammatical structures in English, perhaps because other branching styles require the listener to hold more information in memory to be able to correctly interpret the sentence.

== See also ==
- Branching (linguistics)
