= Knight Foundation =

American nonprofit foundation

The John S. and James L. Knight Foundation
- Logo since December 2020
- Founded: December 1950; 75 years ago
- Founder: John S. Knight; James L. Knight
- Type: Private independent foundation
- Tax ID no.: 65-0464177
- Purpose: Journalism, Arts, Research, and Community Development
- Headquarters: Miami, FL
- Location: 2850 Tigertail Avenue, Suite 600, Miami, Florida, U.S.
- Region served: United States
- Product: Philanthropy
- Key people: Maribel Pérez Wadsworth; President & CEO
- Disbursements: $179.6 million
- Endowment: $2.53 billion (2024)
- Website: www.knightfoundation.org
- Formerly called: Knight Memorial Education Fund

The John S. and James L. Knight Foundation, also known as Knight Foundation, is an American philanthropic organization that provides grants for the arts, journalism, research, and community development, with a focus on impact.

The organization was founded as the Charles L. Knight Memorial Education Fund in 1940. The fund was incorporated as the Knight Foundation in December 1950 in Ohio, and reincorporated as the John S. and James L. Knight Foundation in Florida in 1993.

The Foundation’s mission is to support a more effective democracy by funding projects that promote free expression, arts and culture, research in media and democracy, and the success of the 26 Knight communities where the Knight brothers published newspapers.

== History ==
=== 20th century ===
Charles Landon Knight was the publisher of the Akron Beacon Journal from 1907 to 1933. C. L. Knight had provided financial assistance to college students until his 1933 death.

Subsequently, with the help of Jack Barry, John S. and James L. Knight established the Knight Memorial Education Fund in 1940. It would provide scholarships to students continuing their father's mission of helping Akron college students afford college. The funds were contributed by Knight’s and their newspapers, such as the Akron Beacon Journal, which contributed to the education fund.

In December 1950, the Knight Foundation was incorporated in the state of Ohio. It began with an initial balance of $9,047, transferred from the education fund. Its stated goal was to continue carrying out the work of the education fund, but it was expanded to serve charitable, religious, scientific, literary, and philanthropic purposes for the benefit of the general public. The Foundation began making small grants to local education, social services, and cultural organizations. The Foundation’s first grant to a journalism organization was to the Inter American Press Association for a scholarship fund in 1954.

In its first decade, the majority of the Foundation's financial resources were provided by contributions from Knight Newspapers, such as the Akron Beacon Journal and the Miami Herald, including gifts from John and James Knight. Other Knight newspapers also contributed, resulting in a limited number of grants being awarded to those cities. Despite several family ties, the foundation was legally independent of Knight Newspapers.

On November 12, 1965, Clara L. Knight, the mother of the Knight brothers, died, leaving her 180,000 shares of Knight Newspapers stock to the Foundation. At the time, the stock was valued at $5.2 million. As a result, in 1966, the Knight Newspapers' contributions to the Foundation stopped.

In 1972, the Board of Trustees authorized the sale of Clara Knight’s stock, raising $21 million for the Foundation, leading it to expand its grant programs and scale.

John S. Knight (also known as Jack) did not intend to leave his wealth to the Foundation. However, several factors led him to change his will in 1974. Jack’s health was deteriorating, there was an incoming merger with Ridder Newspapers, and changes to estate tax laws through the 1976 Tax Reform Act could have potentially led to a liquidation of Knight Newspapers' stock, which would have disrupted the merger. Knight Newspapers' C.E.O., Lee Hills, came to Jack and offered the idea of leaving his estate to the Foundation to secure the future of the company and the Foundation. Jack acquiesced, leaving his heirs' trust funds and the rest to the Foundation. After Jack’s passing and when his estate was settled, this would leave his 6,356,504 shares of Knight-Ridder Newspapers totaling $400,000,000 in total assets to the Foundation.

The foundation's headquarters moved from Akron, Ohio to Miami in 1990. At that time, the foundation's portfolio was valued at $522 million and staff had grown to 14 employees.

On February 5, 1991, James Knight died, leaving a bulk of his estate, $200 million, to the foundation. Hills succeeded as chairman of the board.

With the foundation besieged by requests in the early 1990s for emergency funding to "save our symphony," Penelope McPhee, director of the Arts Program, designed the Magic of Music initiative.

=== 21st century ===
In 2006, Knight launched the Knight News Challenge, an open competition to fund digital technology projects that improved how communities accessed news and information. The Foundation also operated the Knight Community Information Challenge, a fund for projects addressing local information needs.

In 2008, Knight announced a $60 million investment in the South Florida cultural sector, including a $20 million Knight Arts Challenge. It has also funded projects and institutions such as the Miami City Ballet.

The Knight Commission on the Information Needs of Communities in a Democracy, launched in partnership with the Aspen Institute in 2008. The commission's work influenced the FCC's National Broadband Plan.

From 2008 to 2011, Knight collaborated with Gallup to conduct the Soul of the Community study. The findings revealed a strong link between residents’ emotional connection to place and economic vitality. Later in 2011, Knight partnered with the Mozilla Foundation to launch OpenNews.

In response to Detroit’s 2013 bankruptcy, Knight joined 11 other foundations to preserve the Detroit Institute of Arts’ collection and protect city pensions in an $816 million agreement known as the Grand Bargain. Knight contributed $30 million to the effort. Knight also supported urban revitalization and civic commons projects in cities affected by deindustrialization. Through the Knight Cities Challenge and Knight Emerging City Champions, the foundation funded grassroots civic projects including Lock 3 in Akron, and Rittenhouse Square in Philadelphia.

In 2016, Knight partnered with Columbia University to establish the Knight First Amendment Institute which is dedicated to defending freedom of speech and the press in the digital age through litigation, policy advocacy and research.

In 2019, Knight published the Knight Diversity of Asset Managers report, revealing that diverse-owned firms represented a small portion of the industry despite comparable performance. At the time, only 1.4% of 82.2 trillion of U.S.- based assets are managed by diverse-owned firms meaning women and people of color. In the same year, Knight committed $300 million over five years as part of the Local Journalism Initiative. It also co-created the Knight-Lenfest Local News Transformation Fund and Lenfest Newsroom Initiative with the Lenfest Institute.

In 2023, Knight joined 20 other funders to launch Press Forward, a $500 million initiative to support local journalism. Knight made a $150 million anchor investment, and by 2025 the initiative had invested $200 million in local newsrooms and established 36 community chapters.

In 2024, Maribel Pérez Wadsworth became Knight’s President and CEO. In her first address, she called for “philanthropy to move at the speed of news,” emphasizing timely and responsive support. New initiatives followed, including a new partnership with Pew Research Center to study civic information consumption and trust, and a partnership with the Poynter Institute to educate new philanthropic funders to the ethics and best practices of funding local journalism.

== Programs ==
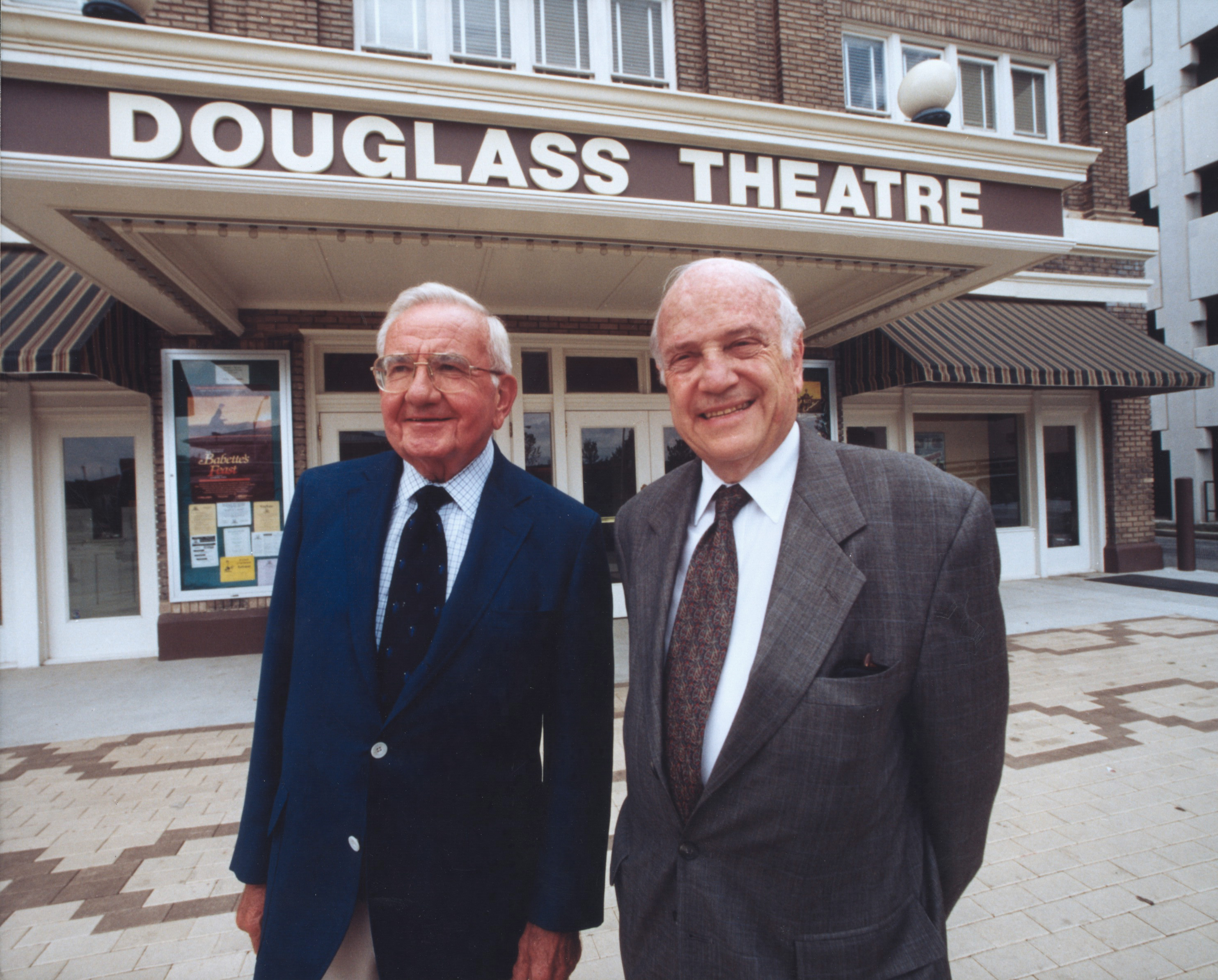
Creed Black and W. Gerald Austen attending a board meeting of the Knight Foundation at the Douglass Theatre in Macon, Georgia

The foundation's website describes grant-making programs in journalism, communities, and the arts. Communities which had Knight-Ridder Newspapers in 1991, at the time of the last founder James L. Knight's death, are considered to be among the 26 "Knight Communities" which are eligible for funding through the foundation's community and arts programs.

== Communities ==
Knight works in 26 communities in the United States. In eight communities, a local program director leads the work:

- Akron, Ohio
- Charlotte, North Carolina
- Detroit, Michigan
- Macon, Georgia
- Miami, Florida
- Philadelphia, Pennsylvania
- Saint Paul, Minnesota
- San Jose, California

Another 18 communities have "Knight Donor Advised Funds" guided by the Knight Foundation via local community foundations. In those communities, the local community foundation is the first point of contact for funding:

- Aberdeen, South Dakota
- Biloxi, Mississippi
- Boulder, Colorado
- Bradenton, Florida
- Columbia, South Carolina
- Columbus, Georgia
- Duluth, Minnesota
- Fort Wayne, Indiana
- Gary, Indiana
- Grand Forks, North Dakota
- Lexington, Kentucky
- Long Beach, California
- Milledgeville, Georgia
- Myrtle Beach, South Carolina
- Palm Beach County, Florida
- State College, Pennsylvania
- Tallahassee, Florida
- Wichita, Kansas

== Education and training ==
The foundation endows Knight Chairs who are journalists in tenured positions at universities across the United States. The Medill Knight Lab at Northwestern University, a journalism technology lab, is funded by the Knight Foundation.

In 1983, journalist Victor McElheny founded the Knight Science Journalism Fellowship Program at the Massachusetts Institute of Technology to support science journalists.

The Knight Foundation funds multimedia training in newsrooms such as National Public Radio and through programs like Knight-Mozilla OpenNews.

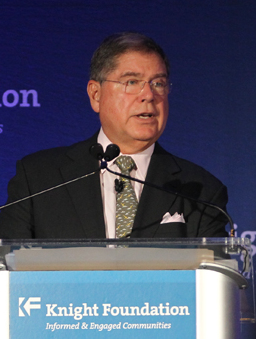
Alberto Ibargüen, president and chief executive of the Knight Foundation in 2013

== Knight Media Forum ==
The Knight Media Forum, in Miami, is an annual gathering of leaders in journalism, technology, philanthropy and the community, presented by the John S. and James L. Knight Foundation.

== Notable people ==
- Jim Brady, vice president for journalism
- LaSharah Bunting, senior editor and journalist

== Assets and grant making ==
Year	Assets (US$)	New grants	Approved (US$)	Paid (US$)
1999	1,888,543,168	311	69,541,641	53,142,772
2000	2,198,985,122	356	93,365,465	69,983,125
2001	1,900,829,942	319	86,433,075	84,970,064
2002	1,718,236,238	459	80,949,242	85,617,981
2003	1,845,869,048	349	128,719,470	90,400,477
2004	1,939,340,905	329	99,905,480	90,358,608
2005	2,071,507,291	286	78,224,147	92,577,162
2006	2,261,797,097	191	73,799,294	104,310,919
2007	2,618,700,006	290	165,310,078	121,267,122
2008	1,974,780,135	263	138,670,778	116,206,414
2009	2,189,663,052	276	141,813,088	105,887,097
2010	2,305,269,825	318	80,045,442	104,920,549
2011	2,192,836,756	380	79,284,121	112,604,594
2012	2,179,634,480	414	92,352,685	112,063,584
2013	2,395,608,862	434	80,483,204	120,694,865
2014	2,443,818,246	531	148,564,966	130,284,911
2015	2,301,502,477	599	150,688,190	126,796,384
2016	2,256,756,854	482	93,859,603	127,865,430
2017	2,473,340,121	500	88,528,014	117,929,820
2018	2,271,386,220	399	157,028,547	105,335,420
2019	2,424,843,251	488	155,146,399	133,711,354
2020	2,674,252,731	381	71,731,889	123,809,334
2021	3,089,444,600	358	95,853,815	114,231,066
2022	2,529,635,008	270	128,159,492	114,141,000
2023	2,603,180,460	315	195,216,207	129,821,000

== Dedications ==
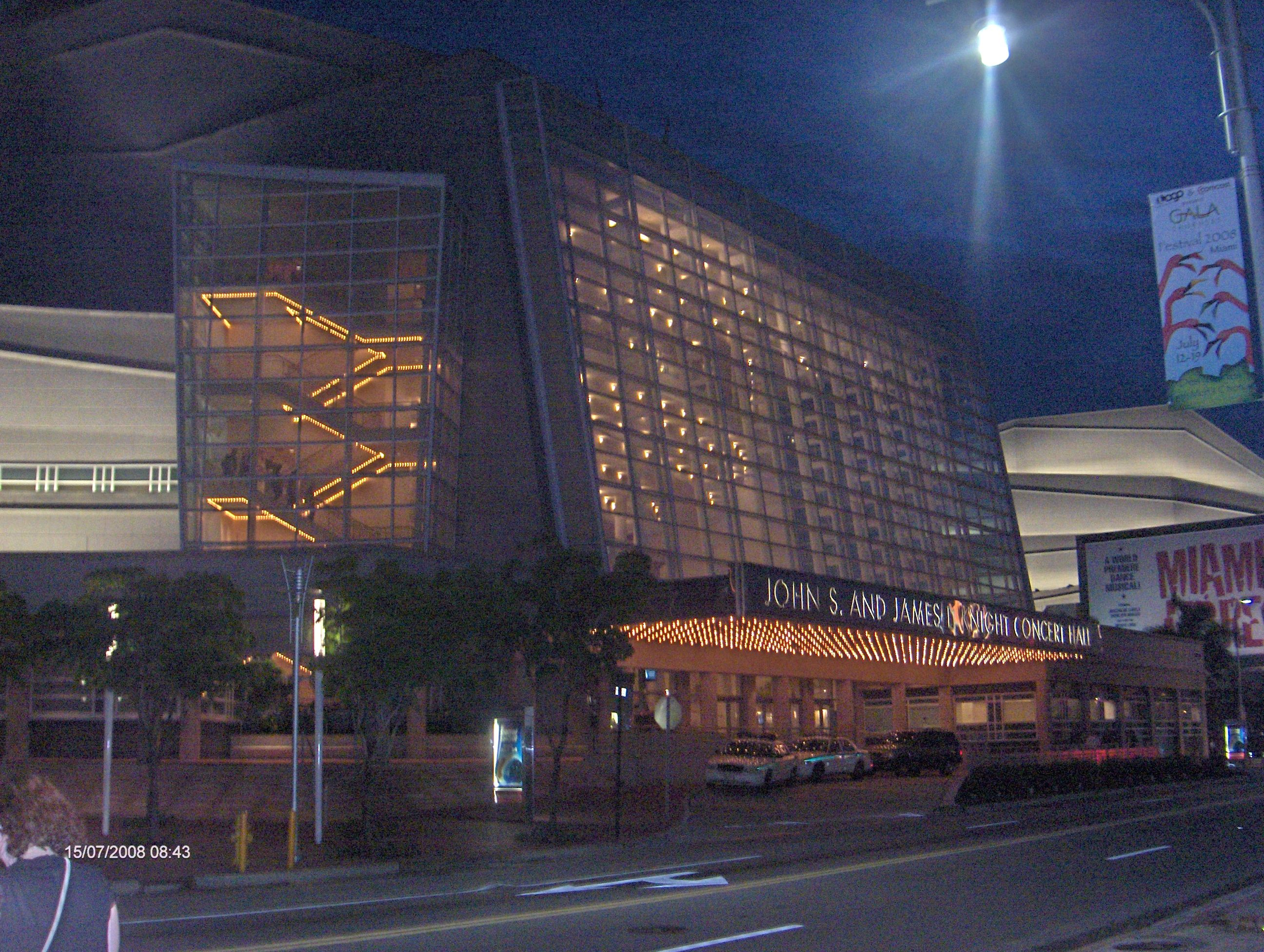
John S. and James L. Knight Concert Hall in Miami in 2008

- John S. and James L. Knight Theatre, a performance venue and part of Levine Center for the Arts in Charlotte, North Carolina
- John S. and James L. Knight Concert Hall, a performance venue and part of the Adrienne Arsht Center for the Performing Arts in Miami, Florida
