= Alberto Ibargüen =

Puerto Rican entrepreneur

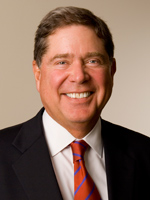
- Born: February 29, 1944 (age 82); San Juan, Puerto Rico, U.S.
- Education: Wesleyan University (BA); University of Pennsylvania (JD)

Alberto Ibargüen (born February 29, 1944) became President and CEO of the John S. and James L. Knight Foundation in Miami, Florida, in 2003. He is the former publisher of The Miami Herald and El Nuevo Herald in Miami, Florida. Under his leadership, The Miami Herald won three Pulitzer Prizes; El Nuevo Herald won Spain's Ortega y Gasset Prize for excellence in journalism. Ibargüen was elected to the American Philosophical Society in 2022. As of March 2023, Ibargüen announced his intention to retire as Knight Foundation CEO.

== Early life ==
Ibargüen was born in Puerto Rico of Cuban and Puerto Rican heritage and raised in South Orange, New Jersey, where he attended Columbia High School, graduating in 1962. He graduated from Wesleyan University with a B.A. degree and the University of Pennsylvania Law School. After college and before entering law school, he served in the Peace Corps in Venezuela's Amazon Territory and in Colombia.

== Career ==
Ibargüen was a legal aid lawyer in Hartford, Connecticut. He became the first executive director of the Connecticut Elections Commission, and practiced law for eight or nine years in Hartford. He joined the Times Mirror Company's Hartford Courant as senior vice president for finance and administration; moved to New York to work at New York Newsday, where he stayed for 11 years. In 1995, he was named publisher of Knight Ridder's El Nuevo Herald and in 1998 he became publisher of The Miami Herald as well. In 2005, he became CEO of the John S. and James L. Knight Foundation.

He has received honorary degrees from Wesleyan University, The George Washington University, University of Miami and Mercer University. For his work to protect journalists in Latin America, he received a Maria Moors Cabot citation from Columbia University.

Ibargüen is a member of the board of AMR Corporation (American Airlines). Previously he served on the boards of PepsiCo, AOL, Norwegian Cruise Lines, SnagFilms, and the Citizen Advisory Committee of the Public Company Accounting Oversight Board. He is a member of the U.S. Secretary of State's Foreign Affairs Policy Board. He has also served as board chairman of PBS; the Newseum in Washington, D.C.; and the World Wide Web Foundation, founded by Sir Tim Berners-Lee. He also served on the board of the Council on Foreign Relations and SnagFilms. Ibargüen is also a member of Washington D.C.–based think tank the Inter-American Dialogue.

Ibargüen has served on the boards of other arts, education and journalism organizations, including the Lincoln Center for the Performing Arts, Wesleyan University, Smith College, the Council on Foreign Relations, the Committee to Protect Journalists, ProPublica and the Secretary of State's Foreign Policy Advisory Board.

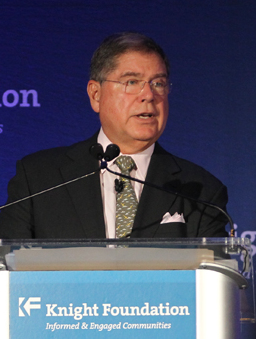
Alberto Ibargüen at the Knight Foundation 2013

In 2014, the Independent Sector honored Ibargüen with the John W. Gardner Leadership Award.

Ibargüen is a fellow of the American Academy of Arts and Sciences and a member of the Visiting Committee for the MIT Media Lab. He has been honored with distinctions from diverse organizations, including American Jewish Committee, Stephens College and the Fairmount Park Conservancy.

As its President and CEO, Ibargüen focused Knight Foundation on its donors' intent "to maintain a healthy democracy through informed and engaged communities". Under his leadership, the foundation has focused on the digital transformation of journalism and citizen engagement and has become a significant philanthropic funder of the arts, using arts and culture to bind people to their communities. He led the effort to found the Knight First Amendment Institute at Columbia University. He was involved with conceiving the “Grand Bargain” that bought the Detroit Institute of Arts during the Detroit Bankruptcy.
