= Burl Osborne =

American reporter, editor and publisher (c. 1937–2012)

Burl Osborne (c. 1937 – August 15, 2012) was an American reporter, editor and publisher. He served on the board of directors for the Associated Press for fourteen years, including a five-year stint as the board's chairman from 2002 until 2007.

Osborne began his career as a correspondent for the Associated Press, based in Bluefield, West Virginia, for approximately twenty years. He then served as an Associated Press managing editor from 1977 to 1980.

He also worked as a longtime employee and executive at Belo, a media company headquartered in Dallas, Texas, for twenty-five years. Osborne worked as the editor and then the publisher of the Dallas Morning News while at Belo. He would later become the president of Belo's publishing arm and a member of the board of directors before retiring in 2007 as a publisher emeritus.

Osborne died of a brief illness at a hospital in Dallas on August 15, 2012, at the age of 75. He was survived by his wife, Betty, and a son, Jonathan.
