= Randall Kaplan =

American entrepreneur

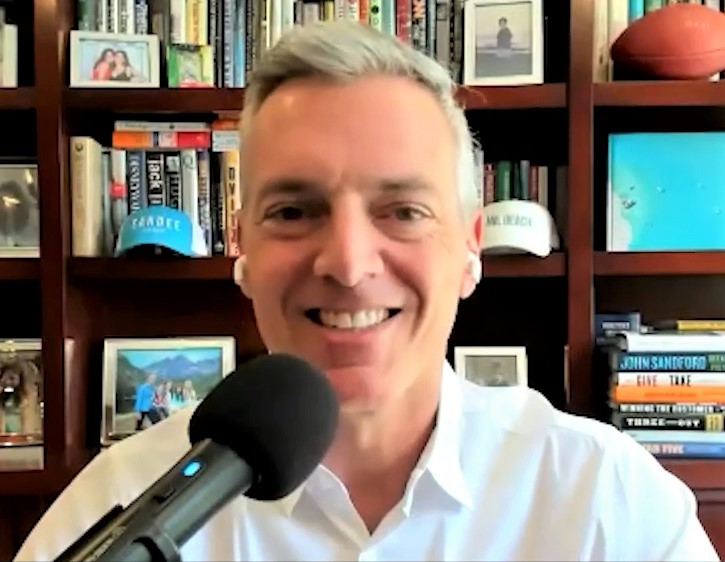
- Education: University of Michigan; Northwestern University
- Occupations: Venture Capitalist, entrepreneur
- Children: 5
- Website: https://www.randallkaplan.com

Randall Kaplan is an American entrepreneur. He is a co-founder of Akamai Technologies. Kaplan is the founder and CEO of JUMP Investors, a Los Angeles–based venture capital and private equity firm.

== Early life and education ==
Kaplan grew up in Detroit, Michigan and graduated from the University of Michigan. After graduation, Kaplan received a J.D. from the Northwestern Pritzker School of Law. Kaplan is on the Northwestern Law Board. He received the school's first Distinguished Entrepreneur Award in 2006.

== Career ==
In 1996, Kaplan was hired as a chairman assistant at SunAmerica, working with Eli Broad.

In August 1998, Kaplan left SunAmerica to start Akamai Technologies with Tom Leighton, Daniel Lewin, and Jonathan Seelig. After leaving Akamai, Kaplan started JUMP Investors, a Los Angeles–based venture capital and private equity firm.

Kaplan, also known as "Mr. Beach," is currently the CEO and founder of Sandee, a travel start-up. Mr. Beach is known for his annual Top 50 Beaches in the United States list that features the best beaches that the United States has to offer. Sandee has been recognized by outlets such as the Los Angeles Times, Entrepreneur (magazine), Maxim (magazine), Coveteur, Skift, InsideHook, The Malaysian Reserve, and the San Diego Union Tribune. Kaplan is also the owner and CEO of CollarCard, LLC, a promotional products company.

== Philanthropy ==
In 1996, Kaplan started The Justice Ball, whose beneficiary is Bet Tzedek Legal Services.

Kaplan is also the co-founder and current co-chair of The Imagine Ball, an annual charity concert whose proceeds benefit Imagine LA, a non-profit specializing in homelessness and poverty in LA. Kaplan established the Julia Eder Dean's Scholarship at the University of Michigan in honor of his grandmother. Kaplan has also endowed a permanent full-tuition, need-based scholarship at the University of Michigan.

== Assault case against Gimelstob ==
In November 2018, Kaplan was publicly assaulted by Justin Gimelstob in the presence of the former's wife and two-year-old daughter. Gimelstob later pleaded "no contest" to a felony battery charge, and was sentenced to three years’ probation and 60 days of community labor. Kaplan's wife attributed the miscarriage of her unborn child to the stress of witnessing the attack.
