= Paul Sagan =

American businessman

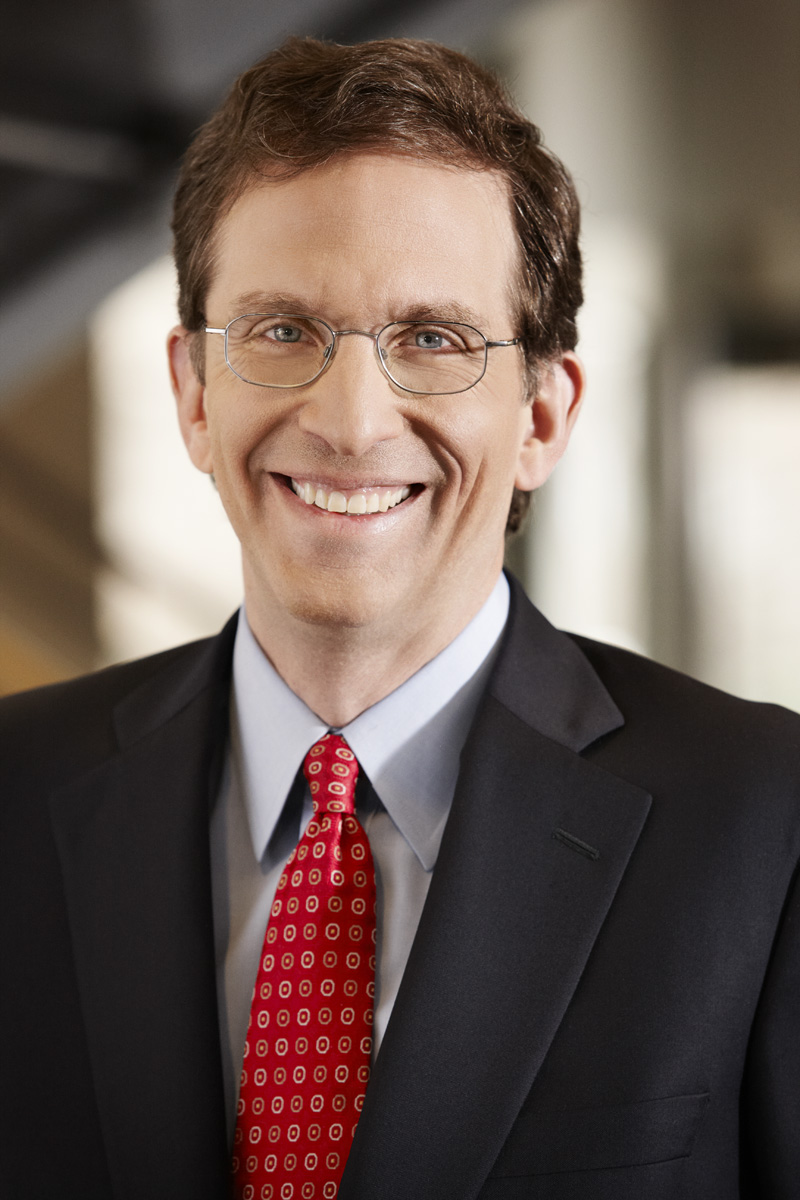
- Born: 1959 (age 66–67)
- Education: Northwestern University
- Occupation: Business executive
- Employer: General Catalyst

Paul Sagan (born 1959) is an American businessman and special advisor and former managing director at General Catalyst Partners. A three-time Emmy award winner for broadcast journalism in New York, Sagan began his career at WCBS-TV as a news writer and news director. Joining Time Warner to design and launch NY1, in 1995 he was named president and editor of new media at Time Inc. Sagan joined Akamai Technologies in 1998, becoming CEO in 2005. In 2014, he became a venture capitalist at General Catalyst Partners. He became chairman of the Massachusetts Board of Elementary and Secondary Education in 2015.

== Career ==
=== Media and news ===
Upon graduating from the Medill School of Journalism at Northwestern University, Sagan began his career at WCBS-TV as a news writer. He was named news director in 1987.

In 1991, he joined Time Warner to design and launch NY1. In 1995 he was named president and editor of new media at Time Inc., a position he held until 1997.

From 1997 to 1998 Sagan served as senior adviser to the World Economic Forum.

=== Akamai ===
Sagan joined Akamai Technologies in October 1998 as chief operating officer, became president the following year in 1999.

He was elected to the Akamai board of directors in January 2005, and would serve as the executive vice chairman of Akamai Technologies.

He became CEO in April 2005. During his tenure, he oversaw a number of acquisitions. He was succeeded as Akamai CEO by Akamai co-founder Tom Leighton on January 1, 2013.

=== General Catalyst ===
In January 2014, he became a venture capitalist at General Catalyst Partners in Cambridge, Massachusetts. He became a partner at the firm. He kept his role as vice chairman of Akamai's board.

=== Moderna ===
Throughout the COVID-19 pandemic, Sagan served as a member of the Board of Directors at Moderna as the company was working on vaccines. He joined the Board when the company was still private in 2018.

== Boards ==
In addition to serving as a director of Moderna, he was named chair of the not-for-profit ProPublica, in December 2016. He is also a trustee of his alma mater, Northwestern University, and a trustee of the Beth Israel Deaconess Medical Center in Boston.

Previously, he was a member of the board of directors of VMware, Inc., and Datto Inc., Dow Jones & Company, Digitas, EMC Corporation, L2, Inc., Maven Networks, OpenMarket, FutureTense, Inc., and VDONet Corp. before each company was sold. He also served for a period of time on the boards of Experience, Inc. iRobot Corp. and Medialink Worldwide, Inc. He resigned from the iRobot board in June 2015.

== Committees and public positions ==
Sagan was appointed by President Barack Obama to the President's National Security Telecommunications Advisory Committee in 2010 and served until 2017.

Governor Charlie Baker appointed Sagan to be chairman of the Massachusetts Board of Elementary and Secondary Education in 2015 until his term ended in 2019. In 2017, there was a controversy when a state investigation found that he had donated $500,000 to the nonprofit Families for Excellent Schools, a charter school advocacy group that had been fined for hiding donors' identities in 2016, and which had been involved in a ballot question the year before. Sagan defended his decision to keep the donation private. The Massachusetts Teachers Association and some others called for Sagan to be fired from his chairmanship for the donation, but the Governor had defended Sagan. As of 2018, Sagan remained chair of the Board of Elementary and Secondary Education.

== Honors ==
He is a three-time Emmy award winner for broadcast journalism in New York. He became a fellow of the American Academy of Arts and Sciences in 2008. In 2009 Sagan was named the Ernst & Young Entrepreneur of the Year award in the technology category. In 2008 he was named as a member of the Knight Commission on the Information Needs of Communities in a Democracy.
