= Linode =

American cloud hosting company

Linode, LLC
- Type: Subsidiary
- Industry: Cloud computing, web services, Internet hosting services
- Founded: 2003; 23 years ago
- Headquarters: Philadelphia, Pennsylvania, United States
- Area served: Worldwide
- Key people: Christopher Aker; (Founder and CEO)
- Products: Cloud-hosting provider Virtual private servers
- Revenue: $100 million
- Number of employees: 200+
- Parent: Akamai Technologies
- ASN: 63949
- Website: www.linode.com

Linode (/ˈlɪnoʊd/) is an American cloud hosting provider that focuses on providing Linux-based virtual machines and cloud infrastructure. It's been operating as Akamai Cloud following its acquisition by Akamai Technologies.

From the time of its launch in 2003, Linode provided virtual private server (VPS) hosting.

Linode was acquired by Akamai Technologies in February 2022 for $900 million.

== History ==
Linode (a portmanteau of the words Linux and node) was founded in 2003 by Christopher Aker. Aker is a graduate of Full Sail University in Florida. The company moved its headquarters to Galloway, New Jersey in 2008. Linode relocated to the historic Corn Exchange National Bank building in Philadelphia, Pennsylvania in 2018.

On February 15, 2022, Akamai Technologies announced its intent to acquire Linode for $900 million. Akamai's founder and CEO Tom Leighton stated that it sought to "combine Linode's developer-friendly cloud computing capabilities with Akamai’s market-leading edge platform and security services".

== Products and services ==
As of November 2019, Linode provided several kinds of virtualization-based computing services with options to meet specific customer needs, such as high memory requirements, dedicated CPU resources, virtual machines with direct access to GPUs. Linode provided services in network-based storage and backup servers.

In September 2013, Linode launched Longview, a system performance monitoring package for Linux that allows users to view performance metrics of their instances from the Linode Cloud Manager. In late October 2019, Linode launched its S3-Compatible Object Storage service to enable customers to store large, unstructured data. On November 11, 2019, at CNCF KubeCon, Linode announced the availability of its managed Kubernetes engine service.

== Security incidents ==
In 2012, the accounts of eight Linode customers were compromised, stealing roughly 40,000 bitcoins.

In 2013, hacking group Hack The Planet (HTP) accessed Linode's web servers by exploiting a technical vulnerability in Adobe's ColdFusion application server. Linode said that HTP could not decrypt any financially sensitive information and reset all account passwords. Linode announced plans to introduce two-factor authentication for its services in May 2013.

Starting Christmas Day 2015 and continuing until January 10, 2016, Linode was hit by large and frequent DDoS attacks, which were being caused by a "bad actor" purchasing large amounts of botnet capacity in an attempt to significantly damage Linode's business. Linode was the victim of another severe DDoS attack over the 2016 Labor Day weekend.
