= Knight Commission on the Information Needs of Communities in a Democracy =

American political policy commission report

The Knight Commission on the Information Needs of Communities in a Democracy was a group of 17 American media, policy and community leaders formed to assess the information needs of communities in the United States in the 21st century, and recommend measures to help Americans better meet those needs. The John S. and James L. Knight Foundation funded the Commission and commissioned the Aspen Institute Communications and Society Program to run it. The co-chairs of the Knight Commission on the Information Needs of Communities in a Democracy are Theodore B. Olson, American lawyer and former Solicitor General of the United States, and Marissa Mayer, Vice President of Search Product and User Experience at Google. The Commission held its first public meeting in Washington, D.C., on June 24, 2008, and subsequent meetings or community forums in Aspen, Colorado; Chicago, Illinois; Missoula, Montana; Mountain View, California; Philadelphia, Pennsylvania; and Washington, D.C. The Knight Commission released its report, Informing Communities: Sustaining Democracy in the Digital Age on October 2, 2009.

On October 28, 2009, the Federal Communications Commission appointed Steven Waldman, Steven Waldman president and editor-in-chief of beliefnet.com, "to lead an agency-wide initiative to assess the state of media in these challenging economic times and make recommendations designed to ensure a vibrant media landscape." In announcing the appointment the Commission cited the Knight Commission as one of the factors leading to this appointment and initiative.

== Members of the Commission ==
The 17 members of the Knight Commission on the Information Needs of Communities in a Democracy are:

Marissa Mayer, co-chair, vice president of Search Product and User Experience, Google
Theodore B. Olson, co-chair, constitutional lawyer and former Solicitor General of the United States
Danah Boyd, social media researcher at Microsoft Research and Fellow, Berkman Center for Internet and Society at Harvard University
John S. Carroll, former editor, Los Angeles Times, Baltimore Sun and Lexington (Ky.) Herald-Leader
Robert W. Decherd, chief executive officer, A.H. Belo Corporation
Reed Hundt, former chairman, Federal Communications Commission
Alberto Ibargüen, ex officio, president and chief executive officer, John S. and James L. Knight Foundation
Walter Isaacson, ex officio, president and chief executive officer, The Aspen Institute
Benjamin Todd Jealous, president and chief executive officer, National Association for the Advancement of Colored People (NAACP)
Mary Junck, chairman and chief executive officer, Lee Enterprises
Monica Lozano, publisher and chief executive officer, La Opinión
Lisa MacCallum, managing director and general manager, Nike Foundation
Andrew Mooney, executive director of Local Initiatives Support Corporation/Chicago (LISC)
Donna Nicely, director, Nashville Public Library
Michael Powell, former chairman, Federal Communications Commission
Rey Ramsey, co-founder and chief executive officer, One Economy Corporation
Paul Sagan, president and chief executive officer, Akamai

Peter Shane, executive director of the Knight Commission on the Information Needs of Communities in a Democracy , Jacob E. Davis and Jacob E. Davis II Chair in Law, Ohio State University

== Commission Report ==
The Commission report, Informing Communities: Sustaining Democracy in the Digital Age, represents one of the most comprehensive initiatives to identify the various types of information that individuals and communities need in order to function and thrive in the digital era. The report's most urgent finding is that a "broadband gap", a "literacy gap" and a "participation gap" combined threaten to hold those U.S. residents who are young, poor and live in rural areas in a second-class status as citizens. The report contains 15 numbered recommendations listed under three broader objectives that seek to "maximize the availability of relevant and credible information", "enhance the information capacity of individuals", and "promote public engagement." A top priority noted in the report is universal broadband access to all Americans.

The Commission report was presented to several notable federal officials during a forum at the Newseum in Washington, D.C., on October 2, 2009. Participating officials included Julius Genachowski, chairman of the Federal Communications Commission; Aneesh Chopra, the Obama administration's Chief Technology Officer; and Ernest J. Wilson III, chairman of the Corporation for Public Broadcasting.
