= Camryn Manheim =

American actress (born 1961)

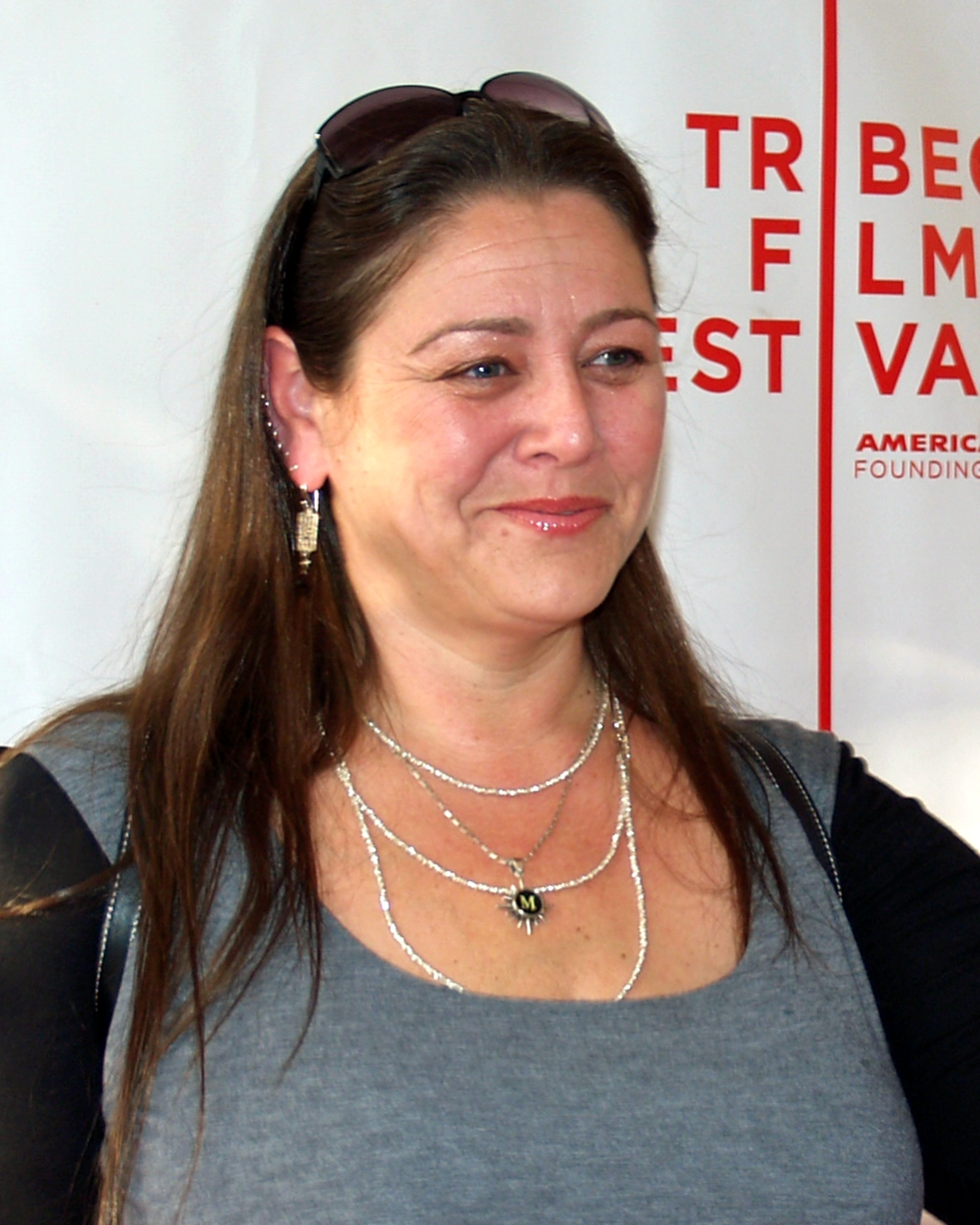
- Manheim at the 2007 Tribeca Film Festival
- Born: Debra Frances Manheim; March 8, 1961 (age 65); West Caldwell, New Jersey, U.S.
- Education: University of California, Santa Cruz (BFA); New York University (MFA)
- Occupation: Actress
- Years active: 1983–present
- Children: Milo Manheim

Debra Frances "Camryn" Manheim (born March 8, 1961) is an American actress who first came to attention with her off-Broadway one-woman show, Wake Up, I'm Fat, in 1994. She is known for her portrayals of Ellenor Frutt on The Practice (1997–2004), Gladys Presley in the 2005 miniseries Elvis, Delia Banks on Ghost Whisperer (2006–2010), Control on Person of Interest (2013–2015), Lieutenant Cosgrove on Stumptown (2019–2020) and Kate Dixon on Law & Order (2022–2024).

Manheim's film credits include Romy and Michele's High School Reunion (1997), Happiness (1998), What Planet Are You From? (2000), Scary Movie 3 (2003), Twisted (2004), Dark Water (2005), An Unfinished Life (2005), and Cop Car (2015).

She is the recipient of a Golden Globe Award for Best Supporting Actress and a Primetime Emmy Award for Outstanding Supporting Actress in a Drama Series, in addition to three Screen Actors Guild Award nominations.

== Early life ==
Manheim was born in West Caldwell, New Jersey, into a Jewish American family, the daughter of Sylvia (née Nuchow), a teacher, and Jerome Manheim, a mathematics professor and the Dean of Letters and Science at California State University Long Beach. Her family relocated several times in her early childhood due to her father taking new teaching positions, and she spent her early years in Michigan and Peoria, Illinois.

When she was in sixth grade, her family relocated to Southern California, settling in Long Beach, where she attended Woodrow Wilson Classical High School. She became interested in acting after working at a Renaissance faire during high school. Manheim graduated from University of California, Santa Cruz with a BFA degree in 1984 and New York University's Tisch School of the Arts Graduate Acting Program with an MFA degree in 1987. Her brother, Karl Manheim, is a law professor at Loyola Law School.

== Career ==
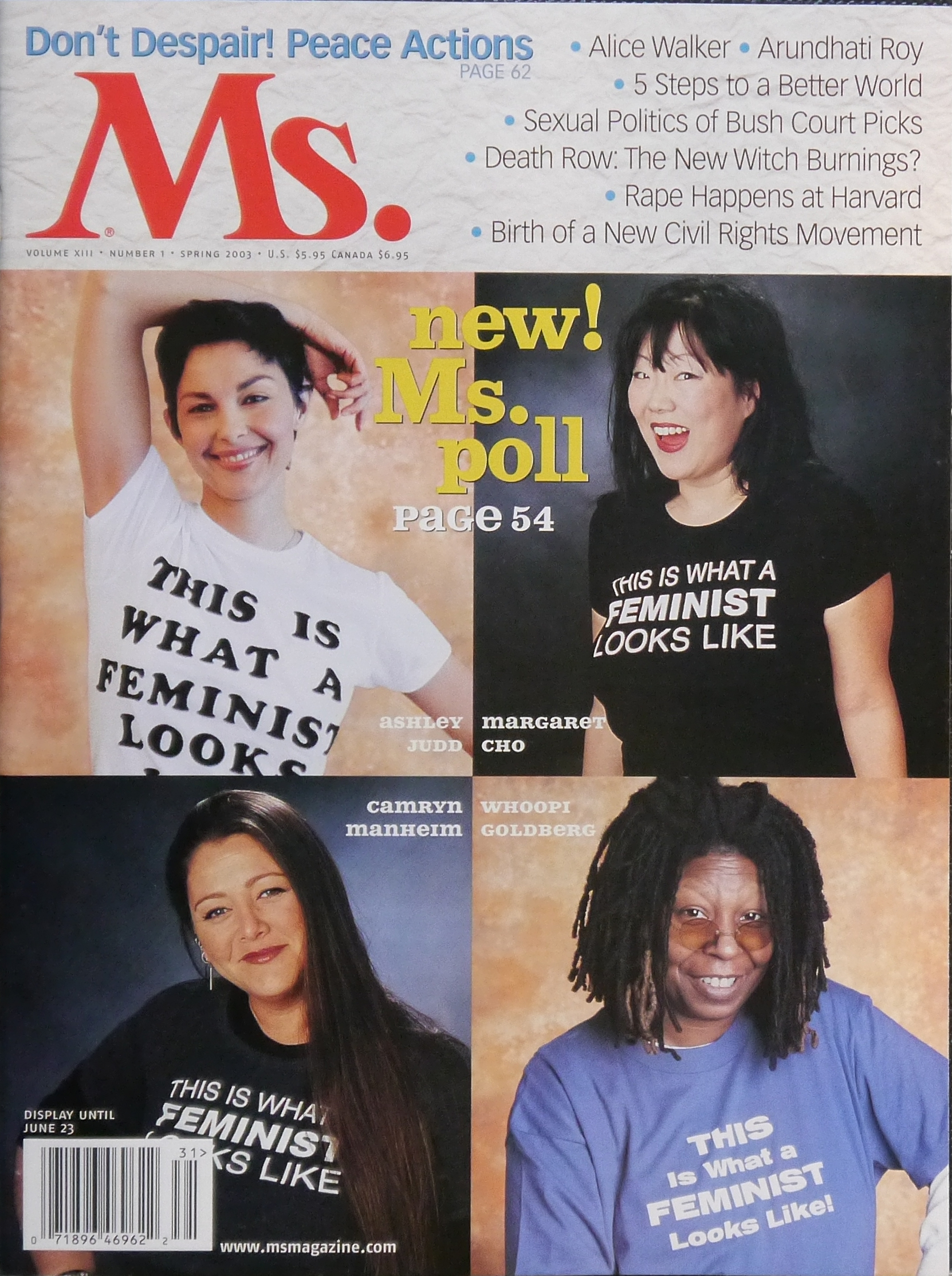
Manheim (lower left) on the Spring 2003 cover of Ms. magazine

Manheim worked for a while as a sign language interpreter at hospitals. Her knowledge of sign language was used on The Practice, in the Law & Order episodes "Benevolence" (1993) and "Castle in the Sky" (2024), and in her role as a child behavioral psychologist in the movie Mercury Rising.

Manheim's breakthrough was her one-woman show Wake Up, I'm Fat, which played off-Broadway at Classic Stage Company in 1994. She adapted the show into a book of the same name, which was published by Broadway Books in 1999.

Also in 1999, Manheim won an Emmy for her work on The Practice and she was awarded the Women in Film Lucy Award.

== Personal life ==
Manheim's son Milo, conceived via sperm donation from her close friend Jeffrey Brezovar, was born on March 6, 2001.

Manheim has been involved with the Los Angeles–based charity Bet Tzedek Legal Services – The House of Justice, serving as a co-chair for their annual fundraiser, the Justice Ball.

== Filmography ==
=== Film ===
Year	Title	Role	Notes
1994	Cracking Up	Unknown	
1994	The Road to Wellville	Virginia Cranehill	
1995	Jeffrey	Single woman	
1996	Eraser	Nurse	
1996	Rescuing Desire	Pappa	
1997	David Searching	Gwen	
1997	Romy and Michele's High School Reunion	Toby Walters	
1998	Fool's Gold	Patricia	
1998	Happiness	Kristina	
1998	Mercury Rising	Dr. London	
1998	Wide Awake	Sister Sophia	
1998	The Tic Code	Mrs. Swensrut	
1998	You Are Here	Registry woman	
1999	East of A	Agatha	
1999	Joe the King	Mrs. Basil	
2000	What Planet Are You From?	Alison	
2003	Scary Movie 3	Trooper	
2004	Twisted	Lisa	
2005	The Land Before Time XI: Invasion of the Tinysauruses	Tria	Voice
2005	Dark Water	Teacher	
2005	Marilyn Hotchkiss' Ballroom Dancing and Charm School	Lisa Gobar	
2005	Snow Wonder	Bev	
2005	An Unfinished Life	Nina	
2006	The Land Before Time XII: The Great Day of the Flyers	Tria	Voice
2007	Slipstream	Barbara	
2009	Just Peck	Ms. Wood	
2011	Without Men	Boss	
2012	Jewtopia	Eileen Daniels	
2013	The Hot Flashes	Roxie Rosales	
2014	Fort McCoy	Florie	
2015	Cop Car	Bev	
2015	Return to Sender	Nancy	
2018	All About Nina	Debora	
2027	Romy and Michele 2	Toby Walters	Filming

=== Television ===
Year	Title	Role	Notes
1991	Law & Order	Leila	Episode: "Life Choice"
1993	Law & Order	Martha Rollins	Episode: "Benevolence"
1994	Law & Order	Beatrice Hines	Episode: "Nurture"
1994	New York Undercover	Bettina	Episode: "Blondes Have More Fun"
1995	ABC Afterschool Special	Rita	Episode: "Notes for My Daughter"
1995	Deadly Whispers	Betty	Television film
1995	One Life to Live	Rabbi Heller	2 episodes
1996	Chicago Hope	Marge Stewart	Episode: "Sexual Perversity in Chicago Hope"
1997–2004	The Practice	Ellenor Frutt	Main role
1998	Ally McBeal	Ellenor Frutt	Episode: "The Inmates"
2000	Family Guy	Ellen Pine (voice)	Episode: "Dammit Janet"
2000	Loretta Clairborne Story	Janet MacFarland	Television film
2000	The 10th Kingdom	Snow White	3 episodes
2000	Will & Grace	Sue	Episode: "Gypsies, Tramps and Weed"
2001	Boston Public	Ellenor Frutt	Episode: "Chapter Thirteen"
2001	A Girl Thing	Suzanne Nabor	Television film
2001	Jennifer	Suzzane Allen	Television film
2001	Kiss My Act	Samantha Berger	Television film, also co-executive producer
2002	The Laramie Project	Rebecca Hillicker	Television film
2003	The System	Peggy Barker	9 episodes
2004	Higglytown Heroes	Plumber Hero (voice)	2 episodes
2004	The L Word	Veronica Bloom	4 episodes
2004	Strong Medicine	June	Episode: "Cinderella in Scrubs"
2004	Two and a Half Men	Daisy Ray	Episode: "A Kosher Slaughterhouse Out in Fontana"
2005	Elvis	Gladys Presley	2 episodes
2005	How I Met Your Mother	Ellen Pierce	Episode: "Matchmaker"
2006–2010	Ghost Whisperer	Delia Banks	Main role (seasons 2–5)
2007	Hannah Montana	Margo	2 episodes
2007	SeeMore's Playhouse	Herself	Episode: "Dental Visits"
2009	Jesse Stone: Thin Ice	Elizabeth Blue	Television film
2010	The Pregnancy Pact	Nurse Daly	Television film
2011–2012	Harry's Law	Kimberly Mendelsohn	5 episodes
2013	Criminal Minds	Carla Hines	2 episodes
2013	The Makeover	Colleen	Television film
2013–2015	Person of Interest	Control	9 episodes
2014	Extant	Sam Barton	Main role (season 1)
2015	Hand of God	Dr. Langston	2 episodes
2016	Code Black	Alice Williams	Episode: "Life and Limb"
2016	Masters of Sex	Alice	Episode: "In to Me You See"
2016	Younger	Jane Wray	2 episodes
2017	Major Crimes	Winnie Davis	3 episodes
2018	Living Biblically	Twila Meadows	Main role
2018	Waco	Balenda Thibodeau	4 episodes
2019	Hell's Kitchen	Herself	Guest diner and Waterkeeper Alliance contributor Episode: "Poor Trev"
2019	The Magicians	Sheila	4 episodes
2019	Heartstrings	Betty Grover	1 episode
2019–2020	Stumptown	Mary Cosgrove	Main role
2020	Utopia	Artemis	2 episodes
2021	Big Shot	Coach McCarthy	Recurring role
2022	Cruel Instruction	Miss Connie	Television film
2022	This Is Us	Debbie	Episode: "Don't Let Me Keep You"
2022	Law & Order: Organized Crime	Kate Dixon	Episode: "Gimme Shelter – Part One"
2022–2023	Law & Order: Special Victims Unit	Kate Dixon	2 episodes
2022–2024	Law & Order	Kate Dixon	Main role (seasons 21–23)
2025	Murder in a Small Town	Jocelyn Tait	Season 2, episode 2, "Blood Wedding"
2026	9-1-1: Nashville	Marcia Zellner	Recurring role
