= Peter M. Shane =

American legal scholar and writer

- Born: 1952 (age 73–74)
- Education: Harvard University; Yale Law School
- Writing career
- Genre: Polemic
- Subjects: separation of powers, cyberdemocracy
- Website: petermshane.com

Peter Milo Shane (born 1952) is an American legal scholar and writer. He is currently the Jacob E. Davis and Jacob E. Davis II Chair in Law Emeritus at the Moritz College of Law at The Ohio State University, where he taught from 2003-2021.[1] Since 2022, he has been a Distinguished Scholar in Residence and Adjunct Professor at the New York University School of Law. [2]

As an academic, Shane is best known for his writings in constitutional and administrative law, with a special focus on issues of executive power and democracy. Political scientists William G. Howell and Terry M. Moe have credited Shane, along with Bruce Ackerman, as having “the insight and analytics, early in the game, to see the authoritarian threat” latent in the late-20th/early-21st century U.S. presidency. [3] Shane’s 2009 book, Madison’s Nightmare, described and analyzed the theory and practice of "presidentialism" as executive branch lawyers advanced increasingly aggressive theories of presidential power from 1981 to 2009. [4] He argued that their theories were rooted in a view of constitutional originalism that mistakenly attributes to the Founding generation a theory of presidential power that history does not support. Shane expanded on his argument in the 2022 book, Democracy’s Chief Executive: Interpreting the Constitution and Defining the Future of the Presidency. [5] The latter volume offered a yet more general critique of originalism as a method of constitutional interpretation, while arguing that, even taken on its own terms, originalism does not support the unitary executive theory that undergirds the presidentialist jurisprudence of the current Roberts Court.

Shane is also known for his anti-formalist conception of the rule of law; he argues that a “rule of law culture” is an essential component of legitimately democratic governance. Administrative law scholar Jerry L. Mashaw has written that Shane is thus concerned with “subtler threats to the culture of lawfulness—particularly those caused by the use of the forms of law in ways that actually undermine fidelity to rule of law values.” According to Mashaw: “This body of work represents one of Peter Shane’s most important contributions to the legal literature and one that deserves careful and sustained attention.” [6] In Madison’s Nightmare, Shane urged that, to undergird a “rule of law culture”: “[T]he written documents of law have to be buttressed by a set of norms, conventional expectations, and routine behaviors that lead officials to behave as if they are accountable to the public interest and to legitimate sources of legal and political authority even when the written rules are ambiguous and even when they could probably get away with merely self-serving behavior.” Following the work of political scientist Kenneth Shepsle, Shane calls the rule of law “an unstructured institution.”

Shane took his degrees at Harvard College and Yale Law School. He was dean of the University of Pittsburgh School of Law from 1994–1998 and, as a faculty member at Carnegie Mellon University Heinz College, directed the Institute for the Study of Information Technology and Society. He served from 2008-2010 as Executive Director of the Knight Commission on the Information Needs of Communities in a Democracy. [7]
