= George Conrades =

American technology consultant

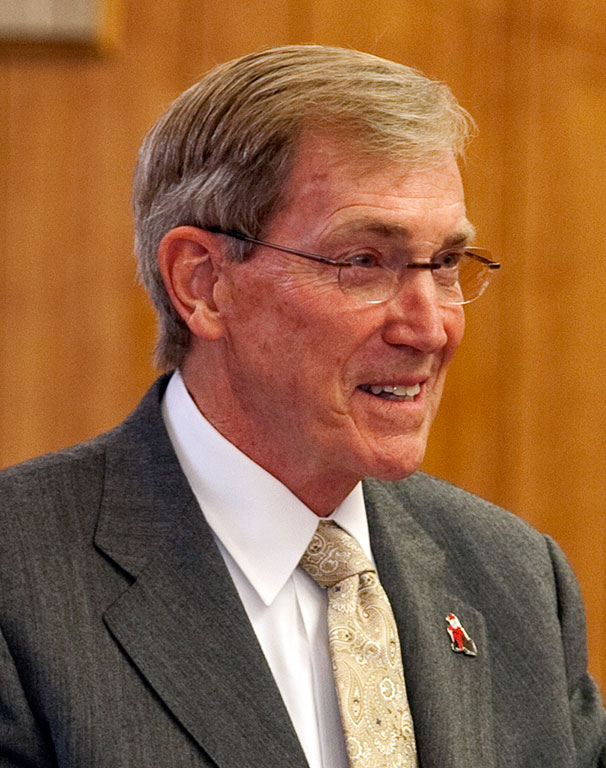
Conrades in 2015

George Conrades is the former chairman of the board and former chief executive officer of Akamai Technologies. Prior to Akamai, Conrades was CEO of BBN Technologies. Before joining BBN he spent 31 years at IBM, running its U.S. and Asia-Pacific businesses and heading two manufacturing and development groups. Conrades is an executive advisor to Akamai Technologies and on the board of directors of Oracle Corporation. He has been on the Boards of Ironwood Pharmaceuticals and Harley-Davidson.

Conrades was an executive producer of the 2013 documentary film 20 Feet from Stardom, which won the 2014 Academy award for Best Documentary. He is a Fellow of the American Academy of Arts and Sciences. He is married to Patricia “Patsy” Belt Conrades.

== Career ==
Conrades spent his childhood in Youngstown, Ohio, during the 1950s.

In 1961, he received his B.S. degree in Physics and Mathematics from Ohio Wesleyan University, and received the M.B.A. from the University of Chicago Graduate School of Business in 1971. He was going to join a rock band after his graduation, but took the position of a sales representative in Big Blue, Columbus, Ohio.

After 10 years at IBM, Conrades got a sales management position in Chicago and inherited the company's fifth largest account, Sears, Roebuck & Co.

In 1971, he entered for the Executive MBA Program North America at Booth. The program provided broad perspectives of business.

The MBA helped Conrades to make a good career at IBM. He took top management positions at IBM for more than two decades. Conrades advanced to the rank of senor vice president and member of the Corporate Management Board. But by late 1980s, IBM faced contest in technological businesses. In 1992, Conrades left his top management position.

Conrades formed a technology consulting firm in the advanced R&D company Bolt, Beranek and Newman (BBN). The company was based in Cambridge, Massachusetts. BBN became an early internet service provider.
