= 3LHD =

Croatian architectural firm

Practice information
- Firm type: architectural studio
- Partners: Saša Begović, Marko Dabrović, Tanja Grozdanić, Silvije Novak, Paula Kukuljica
- Founders: Saša Begović, Marko Dabrović, Tanja Grozdanić, Silvije Novak
- Location: Zagreb, Croatia

Significant works and honors
- Buildings: Memorial Bridge, Croatian Pavilion at EXPO 2005 and EXPO 2008, Riva Waterfront, Sports Hall Bale, Zamet Centre, Zagreb Dance Centre, Hotel Lone, Karlovac Freshwater Aquarium, LN Garden Hotel
- Projects: Bus Terminal Žabica, Rijeka, Croatia (2008), 4_Towers, Zagreb, Croatia (2010), Belvedere Hotel, Dubrovnik, Croatia (2014), Kupari Masterplan, Kupari, Croatia (2018), Viale Market, Poreč, Croatia (2017), K District, Belgrade, Serbia (2018)

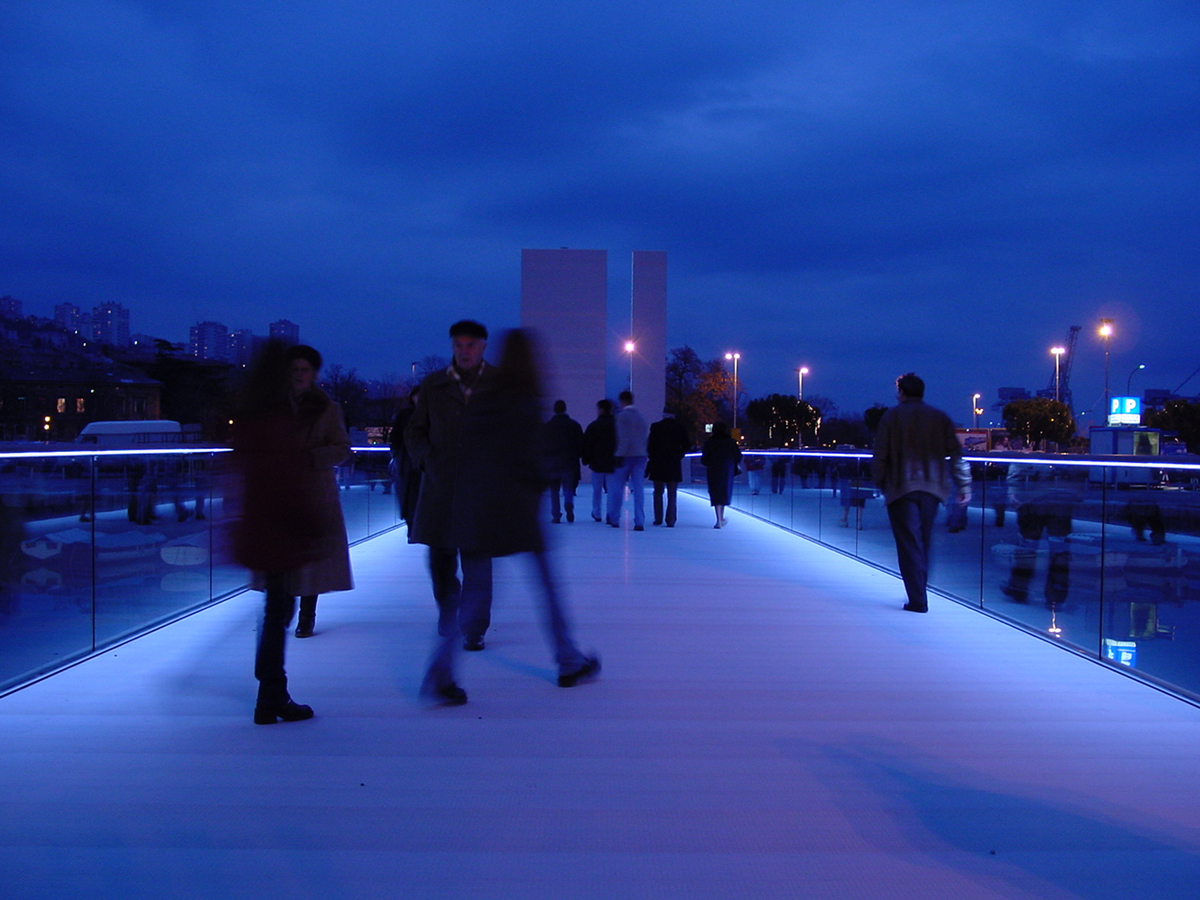
Memorial Bridge, Rijeka

3LHD is an architectural firm based in Zagreb, Croatia. The studio is known for its simplicity and contemporary visual look in architecture. 3LHD was founded in 1994 in Zagreb, by contemporary Croatian architects. The founding partners are Saša Begović, Marko Dabrović, Tatjana Grozdanić Begović and Silvije Novak. In 2016 they appointed a new partner, Paula Kukuljica. Their debut on the scene went with the realization of the project Memorial Bridge in Rijeka.

== Practice ==
3LHD is an architectural firm, focused on integrating various disciplines – architecture, urban planning, design and art.

Projects include Memorial Bridge in Rijeka, Croatian Pavilion at EXPO 2005 in Japan and EXPO 2008 in Spain, Riva Waterfront in Split, Croatia, Sports Hall Bale in Istria, Zamet Centre in Rijeka, Dance Centre in Zagreb, Hotel Lone in Rovinj, Freshwater Aquarium in Karlovac, LN Garden Hotel in China and Grand Park Hotel Rovinj.

The work of 3LHD has received the A+Award in the Architecture +Landscape category 2017, the award for best building in Sport category on first World Architecture Festival WAF 2008, IOC/IAKS Bronze Medal Award 2009 for best architectural achievement of facilities intended for sports and recreation, AR Emerging Architecture Award] (UK), the ID Magazine Award (USA); and Croatian professional awards Drago Galić (2013; 2008), Bernando Bernardi (2009; 2005), Viktor Kovačić (2019; 2011; 2001), and Vladimir Nazor (2019; 2009; 1999). In 2012 Croatian President Ivo Josipović awarded 3LHD with the Charter of the Republic of Croatia for an exceptional and successful promotion of contemporary architecture in Croatia and abroad.

They represented Croatia at the Venice Biennale 2010, 12th International architecture exhibition with a group of authors, and took part in the 2008 'Mare Nostrum' exhibition on the second International Architecture Biennale in Rotterdam, and in a group exhibition in Boston at Harvard University: "New trajectories: Contemporary Architecture in Croatia and Slovenia".

3LHD's projects have been presented in Croatian and international magazines and journals, such as Japan's A+U, Britain's The Architectural Review, Germany's DB, Italy's The Plan, and Croatia's Oris.

3LHD architects are involved in teaching and have been visiting lecturers and critics at ETH in Zurich, the Berlage Institute in Rotterdam, RIBA London, and architectural faculties and universities such as Harvard and Northeastern University in Boston, and technical universities in Vienna and Munich. Currently, the office partners are guest professors at GAF Architectural Faculty, University of Split; at Architecture Faculty, University of Zagreb, Croatia, and Cornell University. Their work has been presented in Vienna, London, and New York City. Given the intense activity of 3LHD in the past ten years, several projects are still awaiting realization.

== Notable projects ==
=== Completed ===
- Memorial Bridge, Rijeka, Croatia (1997–2001)
- Villa Klara, Zagreb, Croatia (1997–2001)
- Kozala Square and Service Building, Rijeka, Croatia (2002–2007)
- Croatian pavilion EXPO 2005 in Japan, (2004–2005)
- Zagreb Dance Centre, Zagreb, Croatia (2003–2009)
- House U, Dubrovnik, Croatia (2006–2012)
- House V2, Dubrovnik, Croatia (2004–2013)
- Zamet Centre, Rijeka, Croatia (2005–2009)
- House J2, Zagreb, Croatia (2005–2009)
- House K, Zagreb, Croatia (2004–2008)
- Bale Sport Hall, Bale (town), Croatia (2005–2007)
- Split Waterfront, Split (2006–2007)
- Sveti Vid Housing, Rovinj, Croatia (2006–2008)
- Hotel Lone, Rovinj, Croatia (2006–2011)
- Spaladium Arena, Split, Croatia (2007–2008)
- Croatian pavilion EXPO 2008 in Spain, Zaragoza, (2006–2008)
- Ski Restaurant Raduša, Uskoplje, Bosnia and Hercegovina (2010–2011)
- Green Pavilion_Restaurant, Zagreb, Croatia (2010–2019)
- Amarin Apartment Village, Rovinj, Croatia (2012–2013)
- Cedevita training camp, Zagreb, Croatia (2012–2012)
- One Suite Hotel, Srebreno, Croatia (2009–2017)
- Lone Outdoor Pool, Rovinj, Croatia (2011–2013)
- Mulini Beach, Rovinj, Croatia (2012–2014)
- Hotel Dubrovnik Palace Renovation, Dubrovnik, Croatia (2013–2014)
- Grand Park Hotel Rovinj, Rovinj, Croatia (2011–2019)
- Janković Manor, Suhopolje, Croatia (2013–2019)
- Karlovac Freshwater Aquarium and Museum of Rivers, Karlovac, Croatia (2013–2016)
- Hotel LN Garden, Guangzhou, China (2014–2018)
- Hotel Adriatic, Rovinj, Croatia (2014)
- Đurđevac Sports and Recreation Center, Đurđevac, Croatia (2014–2019)
- 3LHD Interactions, Zagreb, Croatia (2015–2016)
- ACI Marina Rovinj, Rovinj, Croatia (2014–2019)
- EU Council Promenade, Rovinj, Croatia (2015–2019)
- Public square, pier and Island Reception, Rovinj, Croatia (2015–2019)
- Bužanova Apartments, Zagreb, Croatia (2016–2018)
- ResoLution Signature Restaurant, Rovinj, Croatia (2016–2017)
- Urania, Zagreb, Croatia (2017–2019)
- Campus Infobip, Zagreb, Croatia (2018–2022)
- Residential Block Park Kneževa, Zagreb, Croatia (2019–2022)

=== Ongoing and future ===
- Bus Terminal Žabica, Rijeka, Croatia (2008)
- 4_Towers, Zagreb, Croatia (2010)
- Belvedere Hotel, Dubrovnik, Croatia (2014)
- Kupari Dubrovnik Resort, Kupari, Croatia (2018)
- Viale Market, Poreč, Croatia (2017)
- K District, Belgrade, Serbia (2018)
- reconstruction of The Westin Zagreb Hotel
- Campus Rimac for Rimac Automobili, Sv. Nedelja, Croatia (2019)
- reconstruction of Hotel Marjan, Split, Croatia (2019)
- Hotel Argentina, Dubrovnik, Croatia (2019)
- SDMS Headquarters, Sv. Nedelja, Croatia (2020)
- Mobility Center, Zagreb, Croatia (2020)
- Reconstruction of the Grignano Waterfront, Grignano, Trieste, Italy (2020)

=== Concepts ===
- xCimos Office Building, Zagreb, Croatia (2009)
- Eastern European Center of Culture, China, Xi’an (2006)
- Tower 123, Zagreb, Croatia (2006)
- Kajzerica City Stadium, Zagreb, Croatia (2008)
- Duilovo Waterfront Masterplan, Split, Croatia (2009)
- Campus B, Zagreb, Croatia (2010)
- Mali Maj, Poreč, Croatia (2011)
- Čakovec City Centre Study, Čakovec, Croatia (2013)
- Delta and Porto Baroš, Rijeka, Croatia (2013)
- Dojran Masterplan, Dojran, Macedonia (2014)
- Struga Masterplan, Struga, Macedonia (2014)
- Novalja Urban Development Study, Novalja, Croatia (2014.)
- Spatial Study of the Brseč Tourist Zone, Brseč, Croatia (2014)
- Cultural Centre Sv Nedelja, Sveta Nedelja, Croatia (2014)
- Hotel Helios, Lošinj, Croatia (2015)
- Riva Poreč, Poreč, Croatia (2016)
- Clelia Tower, Limassol, Cyprus (2018)
- Delta Park, Rijeka, Croatia (2019)
- InfobipSA, Sarajevo, Bosnia and Herzegovina (2020)

== Awards ==
- Ernst & Young Entrepreneur of the year finalist 2022
- Hotel Property Award 2020 for Grand Park Hotel Rovinj
- Annual Vladimir Nazor Award 2019 for Urania
- Medal for urbanism 2019 for Grand Park Hotel Rovinj
- Annual Viktor Kovacic Award 2019 for Urania
- Elle decoration "best architecture and design“ award for Grand Park Hotel Rovinj
- ECOtechGREEN Award 2019 for Karlovac Freshwater Aquarium and Grand Park Hotel Rovin
- BIG SEE interior award 2018 for Resolution Signature Restaurant and Hotel Adriatic
- International Hospitality Award 2017 for "opening of the year" for One Suite Hotel
- Balkan Biennale of Architecture 2017 Grand Prix in the category "best built project" for Karlovac Freshwater Aquarium
- Medal for the conceptual project awarded by Croatian Chamber of Architects for the project of the exhibition 3LHD interactions
- A+Award in the Architecture +Landscape category for the Karlovac Freshwater Aquarium
- A+Popular Choice Award in the Architecture +Landscape category for the Karlovac Freshwater Aquarium
- Special Mention ARTUR Conference 2016 for the Mulini Beach
- CEMEX Building Award 2015 for the Mulini Beach
- ELLE style award in the "best architect" for the Mulini Beach
- Rexpo Adriatic 2015 Best New Hotel Award for Hotel Adriatic
- 50th Zagreb Salon Award for the Novalja Development Study
- CEMEX Building Award 2015 Croatia for the Mulini Beach
- Special mention ARTUR Conference for the Karlovac Freshwater Aquarium
- CAA Realizations 2013 – Drago Galić Award for House V2
- IOC Trophy for Sport and Sustainable Development 2012 for Sports Hall Bale
- 47th Zagreb Salon of Architecture Award for Hotel Lone
- International Hotel Award 2012 for the best congress hotel in Europe for Hotel Lone
- European Hotel Design Award 2012 for the best new built hotel for Hotel Lone
- Oris Award 2012 for outstanding creative contribution to architecture for Hotel Lone
- Charter of the Republic of Croatia for an exceptional and successful promotion of contemporary architecture in Croatia and abroad
- CAA Realizations 2011 – Viktor Kovačić Award for Hotel Lone
- IOC / IAKS Award 2011 Silver medal for Centre Zamet
- Ministry of Culture of the Republic of Croatia Annual Vladimir Nazor Award 2009 for Centre Zamet
- CAA Realizations 2009 – Bernardo Bernardi Award for Centre Zamet
- IOC / IAKS Award 2009 – Bronze medal for Sports Hall Bale
- CAA Realizations 2008 – Drago Galić Award for House J2
- World Architecture Festival Sport Category Award 2008 for Sports Hall Bale
- CAA Realizations 2005 – Bernardo Bernardi Award for Croatian Pavilion on EXPO 2005
- I.D. Annual Design Review 2003 for the Memorial Bridge
- AR+D Award 2002
- CAA Realizations 2001 – Viktor Kovačić Award for the Memorial Bridge
- Ministry of Culture of the Republic of Croatia Annual Vladimir Nazor Award 1999 for Vila Klara
