= The Coffee Groundz =

Coffeehouse in Houston, Texas, US

- Company type: Private
- Industry: Coffeehouse
- Founded: 2005, Houston, Texas
- Headquarters: Houston, Texas
- Key people: J.R. Cohen, Preetish Nijhawan, Shirin Nijhawan, Jonathan Zadok, and Segev Zadok
- Products: Coffee, Tea, Gelato, Sandwiches, Paninis, Wraps, Salads, Quesadillas, etc.

The Coffee Groundz was an independent coffeehouse on Bagby Street in Midtown Houston, Texas. As of 2010, The Coffee Groundz was managed by J.R. Cohen and owned by Preetish Nijhawan, Shirin Nijhawan, Jonathan Zadok and Segev Zadok. It was best known for it use of Twitter as means to receive to-go and pick-up orders from customers.

It won: The Houston Press Award Winner Best Coffee House in 2009, and The 2009 Texas Social Media Award Winner. It has been recognized for its unique use of Twitter. The Coffee Groundz has been reviewed on Mashable, Forbes, Entrepreneur Magazine, Bloomberg BusinessWeek, and The New York Times.

The Coffee Groundz closed in 2012, and the space was taken over by the short-lived Aperture Coffee for a few months. In the spring of 2016 the space was occupied by a credit union branch. Through most of the early 2020s it sat vacant. Currently (April 2024) it is occupied by a Mexican restaurant, Dripped Birria.
