= Gypsies, Tramps and Weed =

- Will & Grace episode
- Scene where Jack (Sean Hayes) meets Cher at a restaurant.
- Episode no.: Season 3 Episode 7
- Directed by: James Burrows
- Written by: Katie Palmer
- Production code: 53
- Original air date: November 16, 2000

Guest appearances
- Cher as herself; Camryn Manheim as Psychic Sue; Robert Romanus as Lenny

Episode chronology
← Previous "Love Plus One"	Next → "Lows in the Mid-Eighties"
- Will & Grace season 3

"Gypsies, Tramps and Weed" is the seventh episode of the third season of the American television series Will & Grace. It was written by Katie Palmer and directed by series producer James Burrows. The episode originally aired on NBC in the United States on November 16, 2000. Guest stars in "Gypsies, Tramps and Weed" include Cher, Camryn Manheim, and Robert Romanus.

In the episode, Will (Eric McCormack) reluctantly decides to use a birthday gift certificate from Grace (Debra Messing) to consult a psychic about his future and encounters Sue (Manheim), an absent-minded psychic whose prediction leaves him reeling. Meanwhile, pop singer Cher encounters her biggest fan: Jack (Sean Hayes); and Karen (Megan Mullally) frowns on Grace's new employee (Romanus) at the design firm.

One of the aspects of the episode focused on Jack carrying a Cher doll, as his adoration for the singer. The result of the doll's appearance was a "collaboration" among the show's staff, NBC, Mattel, and the Ketchum Entertainment Marketing unit. Mattel lent the producers a $60,000 prototype of the doll. Will & Grace producer Tim Kaiser noted that the doll's appearance was not any kind of "forced" product placement.

Since airing, "Gypsies, Tramps and Weed" has received positive reviews from television critics. The episode was watched by approximately 22 million viewers and received a 14.8 rating, among viewers in the 18–49 demographic, according to Nielsen ratings. It was also the show's second-highest rating ever.

== Plot ==
Grace (Debra Messing), Jack (Sean Hayes), and Karen (Megan Mullally) are celebrating Will's (Eric McCormack) birthday at a restaurant. As a present, Grace gives Will a gift certificate from a psychic. Additionally, Jack gifts Will a Cher doll, but Will almost immediately and sarcastically gifts it back to Jack. During the dinner, their waiter Lenny (Robert Romanus) is rude to them, particularly to Grace. She complains to the manager which ultimately leads to the dismissal of Lenny. Guilty of the result, Grace hires Lenny as her new office assistant, much to the displeasure of Karen, her other assistant.

Meanwhile, Will visits Psychic Sue (Camryn Manheim) at her home. Psychic Sue begins Will's reading which leads her to tell him that she is sensing a "trip", not for him, but intended for someone close to him, and that she is "getting" China. Will is puzzled to hear that a "strawberry blond hair woman, with brown eyes" still loves him, and he reveals to Psychic Sue that he is gay. Will tells Grace of what occurred with Psychic Sue, which leads to Grace "tripping" over the steps in the kitchen, and her saying "I just broke my grandmother's China." Will reacts to what Psychic Sue told him. He also learns that his parents send him a package containing photos and the collar of his deceased dog, Daisy, who had "thick coat of strawberry blond hair." Will revisits Psychic Sue with the intention of knowing about his future love life. She tells Will that the man he will end up with is named "Jack". Will tells Grace about his return visit to Psychic Sue and how he will end up with someone named "Jack". Will is frightened of the idea that he and his friend Jack, also gay, will end up together. Will finally tells Jack what the psychic said, which horrifies Jack, but Will and Jack realize they are meant to stay together, just in the non-romantic relationship they have always had.

At Grace Adler Designs, Lenny promises Grace clients, but instead he has clients whom he sells cannabis to. Grace discovers what Lenny is doing, and fires him for taking advantage of her. Meanwhile, Jack carries a Cher doll, an adoration he has for the singer. He begins to annoy his friends with the doll, mainly having a booster seat for the doll at a restaurant. At the same restaurant, Jack encounters the real Cher, who tells him it is strange that he talks to her doll. Jack, however, believes that Cher is a drag queen. Annoyed, Cher starts to leave, but returns to sing "If I Could Turn Back Time" to convince him that she is indeed Cher. He does not believe it, which leads Cher to slap him and finally Jack realizing that it is Cher.

== Production ==
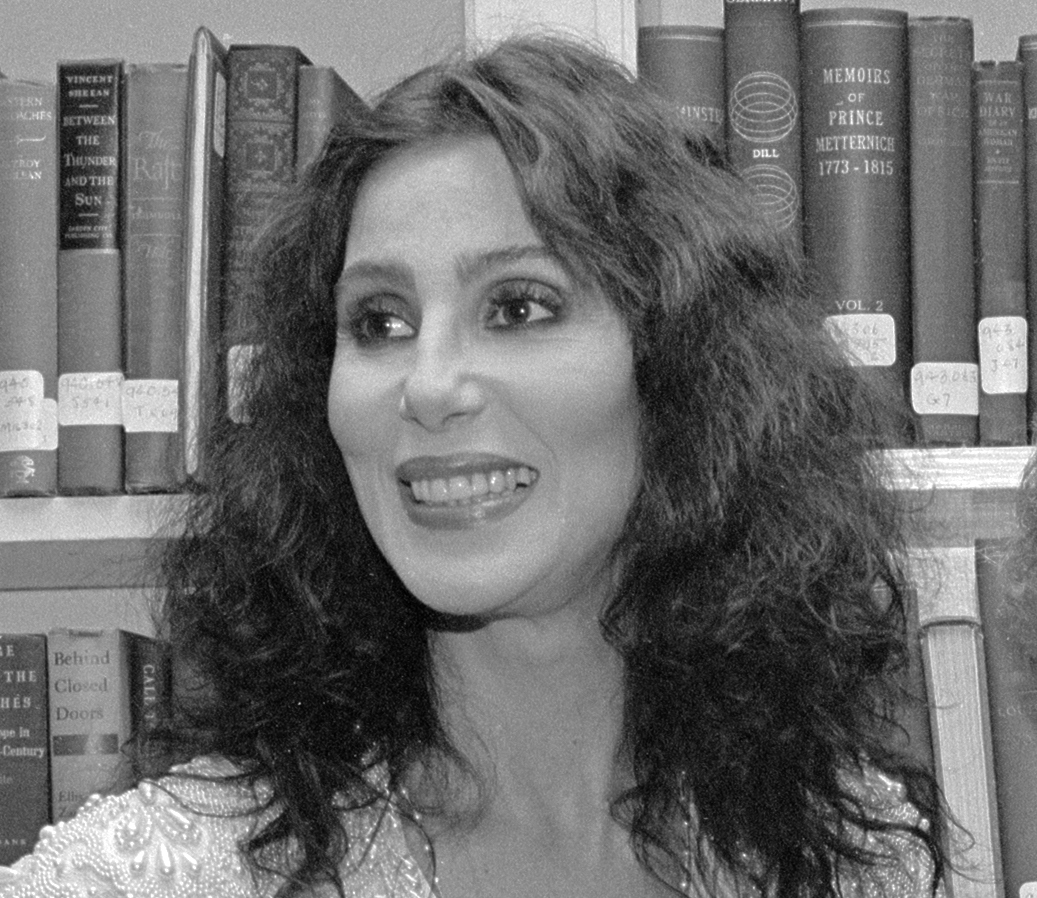
Cher guest starred in the episode. Her appearance was well received by critics.

"Gypsies, Tramps and Weed" was written by Katie Palmer and directed by series producer James Burrows. In October 2000, it was confirmed that singer-songwriter Cher would guest star on Will & Grace as herself. She filmed her appearance on October 17. Cher revealed, "We did two endings. I improvised one. I hope they show it as an outtake 'cause the audience loved that one more than the one they're gonna show. Instead of the thing I was supposed to do, I did something to Sean [Hayes] – something completely different and he just about passed out. I don't know what possessed me." It was also announced that actress Camryn Manheim would appear. Cher would later guest star on Will & Grace two years later.

The result of the Cher doll appearing in the episode was a "collaboration" among the Will & Grace staff, NBC, Mattel, and the Ketchum Entertainment Marketing unit. The collaboration ranged from Mattel lending the producers a $60,000 prototype of the doll for filming the episode, to the scheduling of a Mattel Web site where viewers interested in buying the doll could register to purchase it. Following the airing of "Gypsies, Tramps and Weed", it was reported that 1,200 people logged on Mattel's website requesting e-mail updates on the Cher doll. Co-creator of the show, Max Mutchnick kept the prototype.

Will & Grace producer, Tim Kaiser, in an interview with The New York Times, said that the doll's appearance was not any kind of "forced" product placement, as some speculated, explaining, "It was just a natural fit, because Jack's affection for Cher is a thread that is running through the show already." Kaiser continued saying that NBC "saw the strength" of the episode's storyline and understood that "if a Cher doll is in the show that much, it's an integral part of the episode." Kaiser said that "Gypsies, Tramps and Weed" writer Katie Palmer "originally didn't know" Mattel planned to market a Cher doll and learned about it after working on the script. Curt King, a spokesman for NBC, further commented that the doll's role in the episode was due to the producers thinking of "a lot of humor [that] would come out of it." Mark Malinowski, senior vice president and director at Ketchum Entertainment Marketing, revealed that Mattel was launching the Cher doll and in a "brainstorming meeting" they mentioned Will & Grace as the Jack character in love with Cher. "We thought it would be great to try to include the doll in a plot line of an episode because it would be organic, playing off something that already exists. I don't think any viewer will see this and think 'product placement.' [...] It's strategic for the product and relevant for the audience, particularly the gay men who watch the show because the characters of Jack and Will are gay." It was also noted that Mattel did not pay a fee to the show's producers or NBC to have the Cher doll appear in the episode.

Television critic Scott D. Pierce revealed that NBC did not want television critics to give away too much detail about Jack and Cher's "time together". In a June 2004 interview, actress Megan Mullally, who plays Karen, in regards to Cher's appearance, said: "I wasn't sure about Cher's [appearance]. They flew her in. Like, she was sort of dropped in on a crescent moon, she did the scene, and was, like, airlifted back out. And when I met her she was in her full Cher Land drag, so I didn't get to experience her as a person."

== Reception ==
In its original American broadcast, "Gypsies, Tramps and Weed" was watched by approximately 22 million viewers. The episode received a 14.8 rating, according to Nielsen ratings, among viewers in the 18–49 demographic. It was Will & Grace's second-highest rating ever. The episode finished in fifth place in the weekly ratings for the week of November 13–19, 2000. Since airing, the episode received positive reviews.

Steve Johnson of the Chicago Tribune in regard to Cher's appearance, said "she is put to grand comic use, showcasing the talents of [Sean] Hayes as the series continues to climb to the top tier of TV comedy." Liz Lucero of the Columbia Daily Spectator said that Cher's role was "small enough to still let the core characters shine", meanwhile Scott D. Pierce of the Deseret News said that Cher's guest spot "is also sort of a logical place" for her to make an appearance, "albeit in an odd sort of way." Pierce continued to report that Jack and Cher's scene at the end was a "hoot". Lisa de Moraes of The Washington Post said that the character Jack "did a better Cher than Cher did." The Orlando Sentinel's Hal Boedeker called Cher's cameo "amusing".

Tom Shales of The Washington Post said, "There are a few laughs in Katie Palmer's script". Pierce was complimentary towards Camryn Manheim opining, "she does a delicious turn as a wacky psychic who's about as different from the character she plays on The Practice as you could imagine." Chicago Sun-Times' contributor Phil Rosenthal said that the "most interesting guest" on "Gypsies, Tramps and Weed" was Robert Romanus.
