= Infobip =

Croatian service provider

Infobip Ltd.
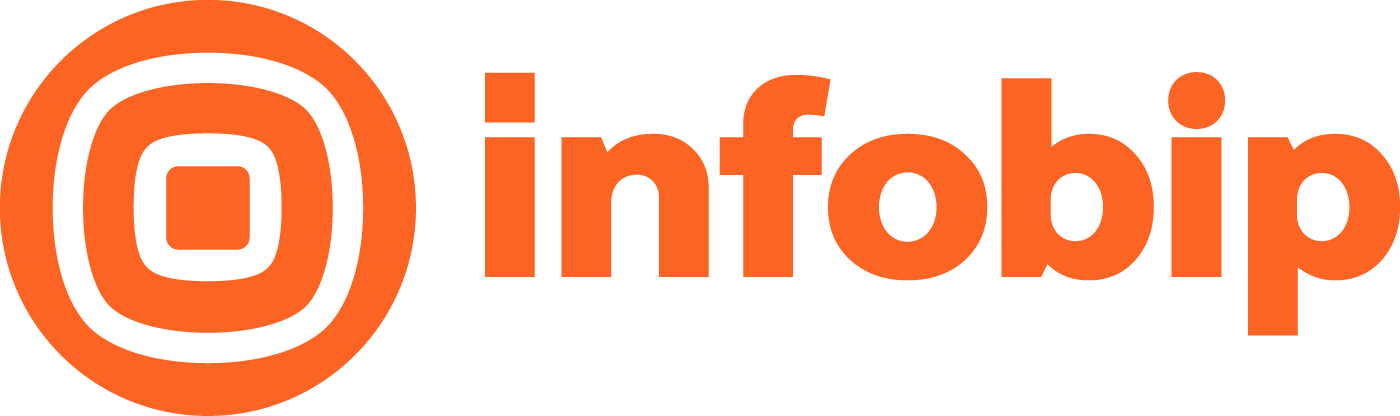
- Type: Limited company
- Industry: Mobile Communications Telecommunications; Cloud Solutions
- Founded: 2006
- Founders: Silvio Kutić (CEO) Roberto Kutić (COO) Izabel Jelenić (CTO)
- Headquarters: London, United Kingdom
- Area served: 200+ Countries
- Products: Communications Platform as a Service (CPaaS); A2P Messaging; A2P SMS Platform; AgentOS; 2-Way SMS; SaaS; CCaaS; 2 Factor Authentication; SMS API; Number Validation; Push Notifications; OTT messaging A2P RCS; RCS Business Messaging; Omnichannel messaging Voice; Email; AIT Fraud detection
- Revenue: €1.2 bn (2021) €1.55 bn (2022) €1.735bn (2023)
- Number of employees: 3500+ (2025)
- Website: www.infobip.com

20 years of Infobip marked at their SHIFT developers conf.

Infobip is a Croatian IT and telecommunications company founded in 2006.

== History ==
Infobip was established in the Croatian city of Vodnjan in 2006 and is led by its co-founders by CEO Silvio Kutić and Izabel Jelenić. Before founding Infobip, Silvio Kutić created Virtual Community, that allowed group communication via web, email, and SMS, with the first message sent as a Christmas text from Vodnjan's town hall to its diaspora. Realizing the technology wasn't scalable, he developed a communications API platform, leading to the creation of Infobip.

In 2014 and 2015, the company expanded operations into Latin America and the Asia-Pacific region.

In 2020, Infobip raised $200 million from One Equity Partners. At the time, its valuation was estimated to exceed $1 billion, making it the first Croatian company to reach "unicorn" status (a term referring to privately held startups valued over $1 billion). That year, Infobip also acquired OpenMarket, a cloud messaging firm based in Seattle, United States.

In 2021, Infobip acquired Shift Conference, a technology conference organizer focused on areas such as software development, fintech, and artificial intelligence.

In July 2022, Infobip acquired Peerless Network, a U.S.-based telecommunications provider founded in 2008. Infobip's revenue reached €1.55 billion in 2022 and €1.735 billion in 2023. The company's global communications platform handles 453 billion interactions per year, or 37 billion per month, with 301 billion being SMS interactions. During Cyber Week 2024, Infobip saw a 41% increase in total interactions, growing from 8.2 billion in 2023 to 11.6 billion in 2024.

In May 2023, Infobip was named a leader in the IDC MarketScape CPaaS Vendor Assessment. In July, the company was recognized as a leader in the Juniper Customer Data Platform Leaderboard.

In September 2023, Infobip was named a leader in the Gartner Magic Quadrant for Communications Platform as a Service (CPaaS), and as a leader in the Conversational Commerce Leaderboard in October.

In December 2023, Infobip was included in the top CPaaS provider in the inaugural MetriRank CPaaS Report and also named a leader in the CCaaS Leaderboard by Juniper Research. Since 2023, Infobip supports more than 300 startups with €1.8 million through the Infobip Startup Tribe, a global perks program supporting startups and providing them with tools and resources to help their growth.

In March 2024, Infobip was named to Fast Company’s Annual List of the World’s Most Innovative Companies and as a leader in the CPaaS Leaderboard, Juniper Research. In June 2024, Infobip was named a Leader in the Gartner Magic Quadrant for Communications Platform as a Service (CPaaS) 2024 for the second year running. In October 2024, Juniper Research recognized Infobip as the number one provider in the AIT Fraud Prevention market.

In November 2024, Infobip was ranked one of the top 3 most innovative companies in retail in Fast Company Middle East’s Most Innovative Companies 2024 list, and Juniper Research ranked Infobip number one among Established Leaders in RCS Business Messaging. In December 2024, Infobip was named one of the top CPaaS providers in Metrigy’s CPaaS MetriRank Report for the third time.

In February 2025, Infobip was named a Leader for the third time in the IDC MarketScape, and Infobip was named an Ecosystem Leader in the Ecosystem Compass 2025. In April 2025, Infobip was ranked as a Leader in the Omdia CPaaS Universe Report for the third time. The company was ranked an Established Leader in the Juniper Research Conversational AI Leaderboard in February 2025.

In February 2026, Infobip launched AgentOS, an AI-native, fully managed platform AgentOS. At the same time, Infobip was named the number one Established Leader in the Juniper Research RCS for Business 2026 Leaderboard. Also, the company was named a Leader in the 2026 Gartner Magic Quadrant for Communications Platform-as-a-Service (CPaaS) for the fourth consecutive year. In June 2026, Infobip was ranked in the top 25 of Fortune’s Europe’s Most Innovative Companies 2026. In July, Infobip announced the acquisition of SocketLabs, a US-based company building infrastructure for high-volume, multi-provider email.

At the same time, Infobip enabled data residency in Canada, making for Canadian companies to protect consumer information, maintain business operations, and keep pace with changes in regional compliance requirements.

The 20 years of Infobip founding was marked at their SHIFT developers conf. in September 2026, in Zadar, Croatia

Partnership with TGR Haas F1 Team

In May 2025, Infobip announced a partnership with the Haas F1 team. The partnership won Silver at The Drum B2B Awards for its first year. In April 2026, the partnership launched RaceMate, an always-on AI assistant built on Infobip’s agentic AI platform and available across WhatsApp, Apple Business Messages and RCS.

== Campuses ==
In September 2017, the company opened a 17,000-square-meter campus named Pangea in Vodnjan, Croatia.

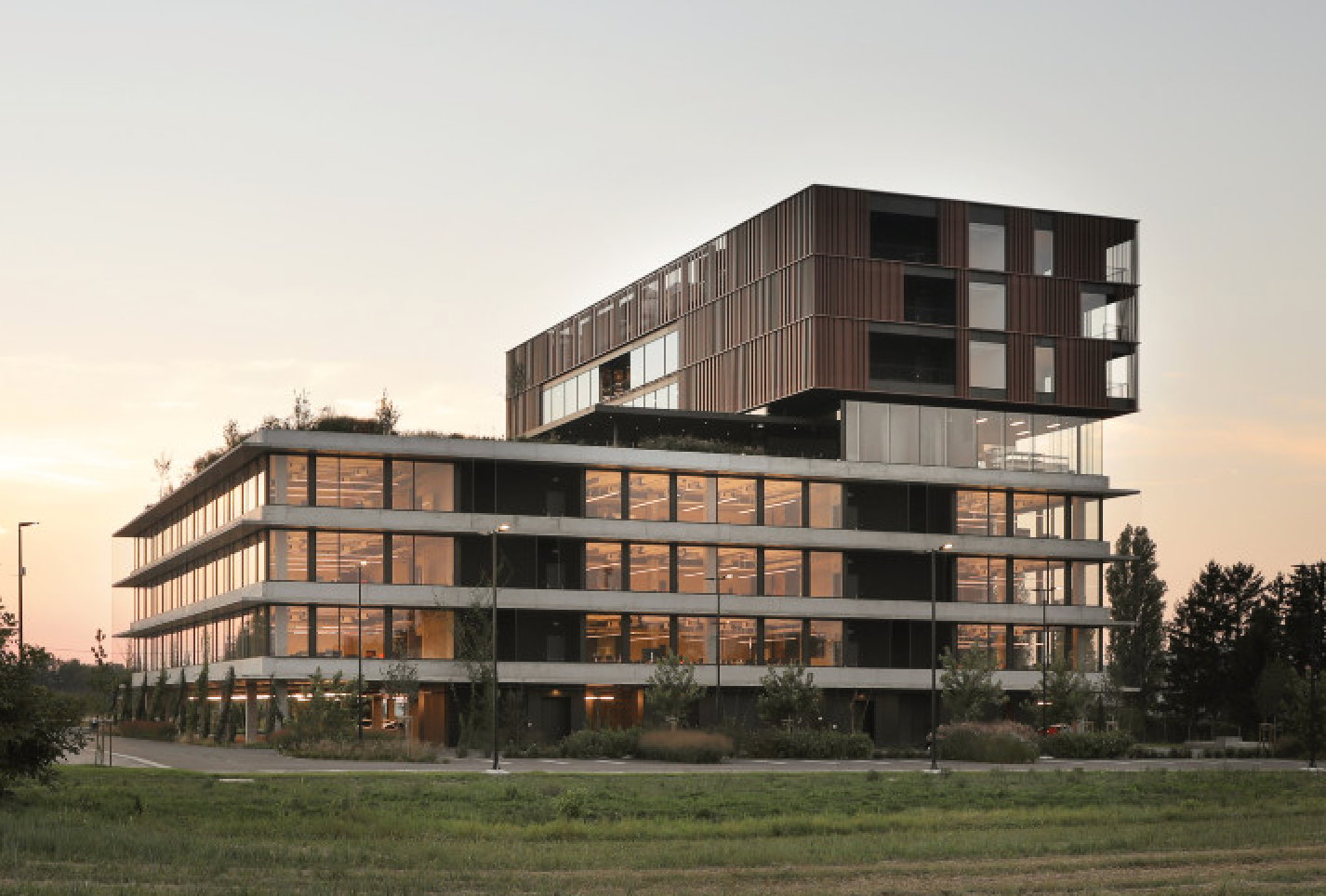
Zagreb Campus - Opened in 2022

In 2022, Infobip opened a second campus in Zagreb, named Alpha Centauri. Designed by the 3LHD architectural firm, the 20,000-square-meter campus is located near the Sveta Klara and Remetinec neighborhoods.

== See also ==
- Cloud communications
- Text messaging
- GSMA
- SMS
- Telecommunication
- Rich Communications Services (RCS)
