= Andrea Prat =

Italian economist (born 1967)

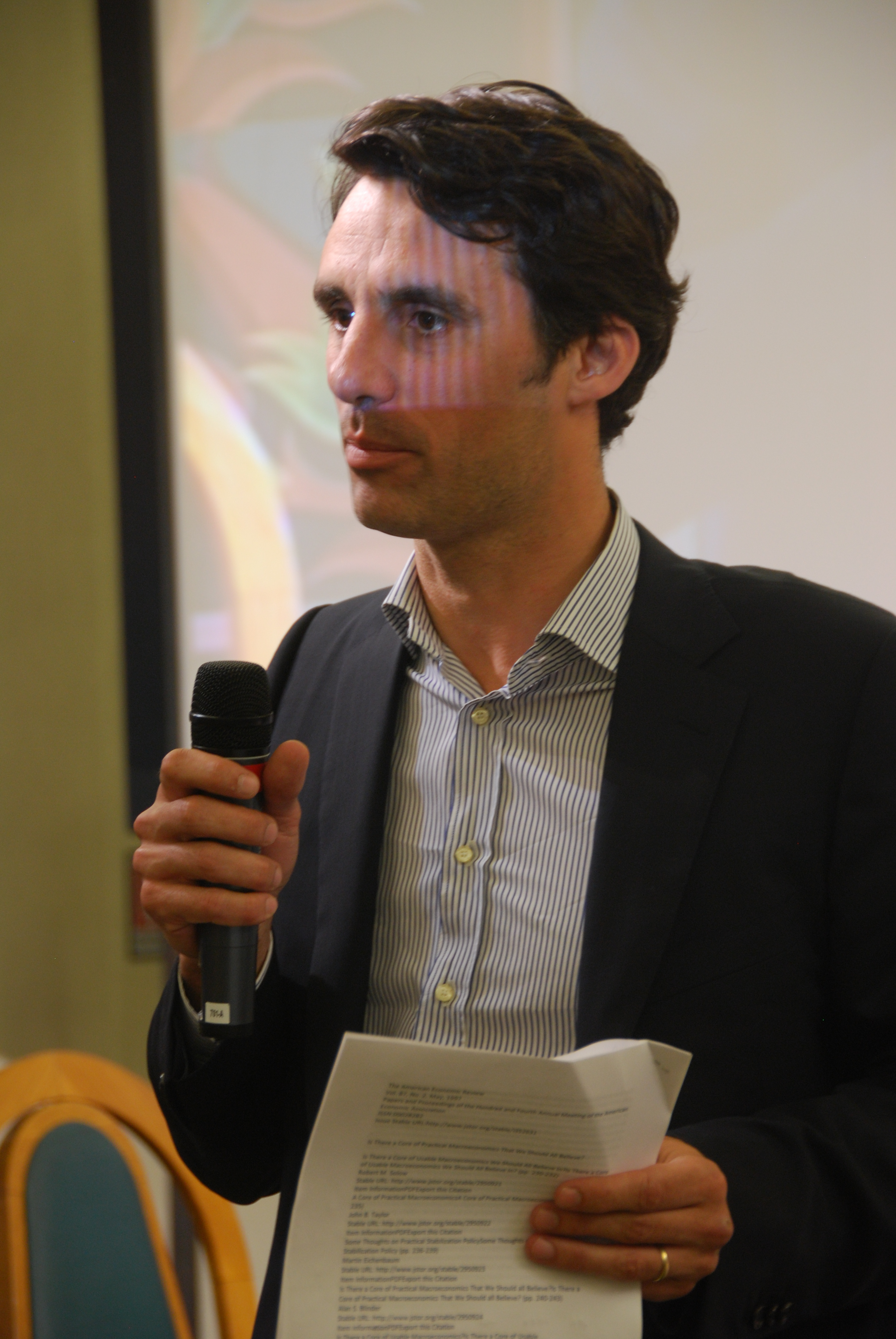
- Prat in 2009
- Born: 1 November 1967 (age 58); Italy

Academic background
- Education: Stanford University (Ph.D., 1997); University of Turin (Laurea, 1992)
- Doctoral advisor: Kenneth Arrow

Academic work
- Discipline: Microeconomics; Organizational Economics; Political economy
- Institutions: Columbia University
- Awards: Fellow, British Academy (elected 2011); Fellow, Econometric Society (elected 2013), Honorary Doctorate, University of St Gallen (2020), Corresponding Fellow, Accademia delle Scienze di Torino (elected 2023).
- Website: Information at IDEAS / RePEc

Andrea Prat (born 1967) is an Italian economist. He is the Richard Paul Richman Professor of Business and professor of economics at Columbia University. He first studied economics at the University of Turin and then obtained his PhD in 1997 at Stanford University under the supervision of Kenneth Arrow. Prat has also taught at the London School of Economics and at Tilburg University.

He served as chairman and managing editor of the Review of Economic Studies and as an associate editor of Theoretical Economics. He is the editor-in-chief of The Journal of Law, Economics, & Organization. Prat is a Fellow of the British Academy and of the Econometric Society. He is a corresponding fellow of the Accademia delle Scienze. In 2020, he received an honorary doctorate from the University of St. Gallen.
