= Jerry L. Mashaw =

American academic

Jerry L. Mashaw is an American lawyer, academic, and author. He is the Sterling Professor emeritus and professorial lecturer of law at Yale University. He teaches courses in administrative law, legislation, social welfare policy, and law and regulation.

== Early life ==
Mashaw graduated from C. E. Byrd High School in Shreveport Louisiana in 1959. He received a B. A. in philosophy from Tulane University in 1962. Hethenm received an LL.B. from Tulane University School of Law in 1964, where he was editor-in-chief of the Tulane Law Review, a member of the Order of the Coif, and graduated first in his class. He earned a Ph.D (1969) from the University of Edinburgh (European governmental studies), where he studied with a Marshall Scholarship.

== Career ==
Mashaw has been an assistant professor of law at the Tulane Law School (1966–68); assistant, associate and professor of law at the University of Virginia Law School (1968–76); and professor of law at the Yale Law School (1976–2015) where he was professor at the Yale Institute of Social and Policy Studies (1982–2010); William Nelson Cromwell Professor of Law (1982–90); Gordon Bradford Tweedy Professor of Law and Organization (1991–94); and Sterling Professor of Law and Management (1994–2015). He became Sterling Professor of Law Emeritus and professorial lecturer at Yale University in 2015. Mashaw has also taught and lectured widely at other U.S. law schools, universities, and research institutes as well as law schools in Asia, Europe, and Latin America.

Mashaw has been a public member and senior fellow at the Administrative Conference of the United States; a fellow, past president, and past member of the board of trustees at the National Academy of Social Insurance, and a Fellow at the National Academy of Arts and Sciences. He has been an occasional consultant to the Social Security Administration, the National Institute of Medicine, the Administrative Conference of the United States, various private foundations, and the governments of China, Argentina, and Peru.

He is a Fellow of American Academy of Arts and Sciences.

== Scholarship ==
Mashaw has been active in the fields of administrative law and regulation, social welfare law and policy, and the interdisciplinary study of law and legal institutions. In the Introduction to Administrative Law from the Inside Out: Essays on Themes from the Work of Jerry Mashaw (Cambridge 2017), Professor Nicholas Parrillo described Mashaw's position in the field of administrative law:

This volume assembles the latest work on U.S. administrative law by nearly two dozen scholars in the area. The focal point for their contributions is the work of Jerry Mashaw, a figure widely admired despite (or perhaps because of) his ambivalent relationship to the field. On the one hand, Mashaw is the consummate insider: a professor at Yale Law School since 1976 and holder of a Sterling chair, the university’s highest honor; three-time winner of the ABA Administrative Law Section’s award for scholarship; and longtime public member of the Administrative Conference of the United States. On the other hand, Mashaw is an outsider. Throughout his career, he has been trying to persuade scholars of administrative law that their field is misconceived in its premises and focus. He has pushed boundaries, composed sweeping indictments, built bridges to other disciplines, and illuminated alternative ways of seeing. He has lived in never-ending creative tension with the field he calls home.

In the field of social welfare policy and law, Mashaw has published numerous articles and books arguing for a more unified conception of social insurance based on an understanding of the common risks of income inadequacy over an individual's life cycle and calling for major changes in the design and administration of social welfare programs.

Mashaw's contributions to interdisciplinary studies include the founding, with Oliver Williamson, of the Journal of Law, Economics and Organization and numerous articles and books both critiquing and applying positive political theory (often called public choice theory) to the analysis of law and legal institutions.

== Personal life ==
Mashaw is married to Anne U. MacClintock, an artist, retired from a career as a teacher, lawyer, and business executive. They have two children. He and his wife have written articles about their sailing adventures and a sailing memoir, Seasoned by Salt: A Voyage in Search of the Caribbean, winner of the John Southard award for sailing journalism.

== Selected publications ==
- Social Security Hearings and Appeals (with W. Schwartz, P. Verkuil, C. Goetz, and F. Goodman). Lexington Books, 1978. ISBN 9780669023169.
- Bureaucratic Justice: Managing Social Security Disability Claims. New Haven: Yale University Press, 1983. ISBN 978-0300034035.
- Due Process in the Administrative State. New Haven: Yale University Press, 1985. ISBN 9780300032581.
- America's Misunderstood Welfare State: Persistent Myths, Enduring Realities (with T.R. Marmor and P.L. Harvey). Basic Books, 1990. ISBN 978-0465001231.
- The Struggle for Auto Safety (with D.L. Harfst). Cambridge, Massachusetts: Harvard University Press, 1990. ISBN 978-0674845305.
- Disability, Work and Cash Benefits (edited with V. Reno, R. Burkhauser, and M. Berkowitz). Kalamazoo: W. E. Upjohn Institute for Employment Research, 1996. ISBN 9780880991681.
- Balancing Security and Opportunity: The Challenge of Disability Income Policy (with V. Reno). Brookings Institution Press, 1996. ISBN 978-0815774051.
- Challenge for Social Insurance, Health Care Financing and Labor Market Policy (with V. Reno and W. Gradison). Brookings, 1996. ISBN 978-0815774051.
- Greed, Chaos and Governance: Using Public Choice to Improve Public Law. New Haven: Yale University Press, 1997. ISBN 978-0300078701.
- True Security: Rethinking American Social Insurance (with M.J. Graetz). New Haven: Yale University Press, 1999. ISBN 978-0300081947.
- Seasoned by Salt: A Voyage in Search of the Caribbean (with Anne U. MacClintock). Sheridan House, 2003. ISBN 978-1574092462.
- Creating the Administrative Constitution: The Lost 100 Years of American Administrative Law. New Haven: Yale University Press, 2012. ISBN 978-0300180022.
- Social Insurance: America's Neglected Heritage and Contested Future (with T.R. Marmor and John Pakutka). Sage, 2013. ISBN 978-1452240008.
- Reasoned Administration and Democratic Legitimacy: How Administrative Law Supports American Democracy. Cambridge University Press, 2018. ISBN 978-1108413114.
- Administrative Law: The American Public Law System, 9th edition (with Richard A. Merrill, Peter M. Shane, M. Elizabeth Magill, Mariano-Florentino Cuellar & Nicholas R. Parillo). West Academic Publishing, 2024. ISBN 9781685611989.
