= Terry M. Moe =

American political scientist (born 1949)

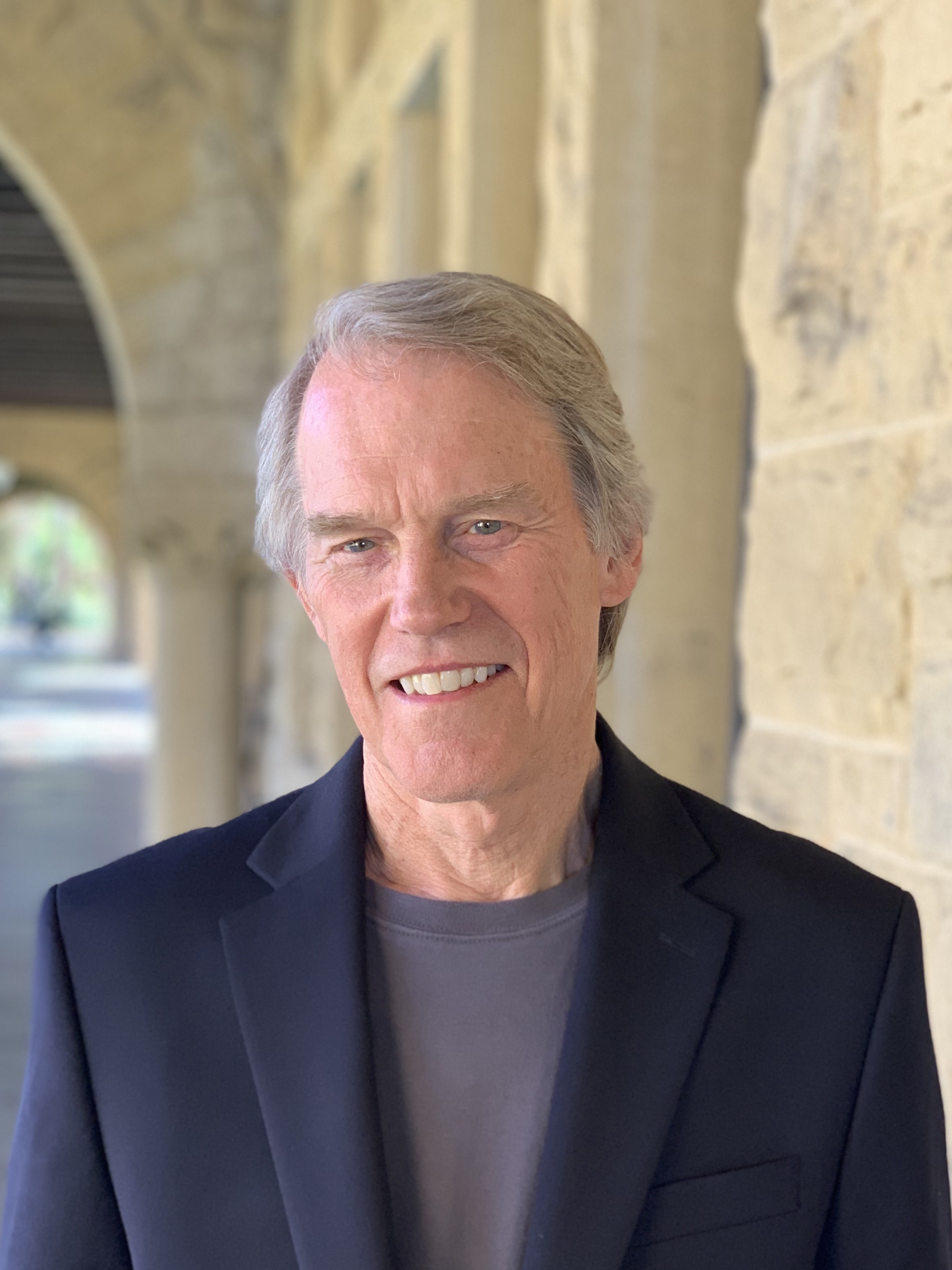
Terry M. Moe

Terry M. Moe (born 1949) is an American political scientist and author. He has been at Stanford University for over 40 years, and is William Bennett Munro professor of political science emeritus at Stanford, and a senior fellow emeritus at Stanford's Hoover Institution.

== Early life and education ==
Moe was born on June 25, 1949. He received a B.A. in economics from the University of California, San Diego in 1971, and a Ph.D. in political science from the University of Minnesota in 1976.

== Academic work ==
Moe began his career in 1976 as an assistant professor of political science at Michigan State University. In 1980, he published his first book, The Organization of Interests, which explored the organizational foundations of political interest groups, building on the work of Mancur Olson. In 1981, he moved from Michigan State to Stanford, but he soon took temporary leave to be a senior fellow at the Brookings Institution in Washington, D.C. During his stay there, from 1984 to 1986, he engaged in collaborative work with John E. Chubb on what became their 1990 book, Politics, Markets, and America's Schools, which, in showing how politics and special interests undermine the organization and performance of public schools, and in arguing the value of school choice, had a major impact on the education reform movement and remains widely cited.

At the same time, Moe was writing on the presidency, public bureaucracy, and political institutions more generally. Through such articles as "The New Economics of Organization," "The Politicized Presidency," "The Politics of Bureaucratic Structure," and "Political Institutions: The Neglected Side of the Story," he was an early proponent of putting the analytics of institutional theory to use in transforming the study of bureaucracy and the presidency. A theme running throughout his work was (and is) that the organization of government - of departments, agencies, schools - arises out of politics and the power of special interests, and thus is literally not designed to be efficient or effective. It is because of this pervasive "politics of structure," he argues, that government often doesn't perform well.

Throughout the following decades, Moe continued to split his research efforts between political institutions and the politics of education. But these two streams of research were never really separate. They shared the same theoretical perspective - framed by power, special interests, and the politics of structure - and aimed to shed light on the same problems of inadequate governmental performance, showing how they are rooted in politics.

His subsequent work on the politics of education has focused largely on the power of teachers unions, their impacts on the organization and performance of schools, and their political opposition to reform. Among his more recent education publications are Special Interest: Teachers Unions and America's Public Schools, The Comparative Politics of Education: Teachers Unions and Education Systems around the World (edited with Susanne Wiborg), and The Politics of Institutional Reform: Katrina, Education, and the Second Face of Power.

His work on political institutions has moved along a few different tracks. He has dealt with important theoretical issues that go to the heart of the institutions literature—notably, "Power and Political Institutions" and "Vested Interests and Political Institutions." He has also carried out research with Sarah F. Anzia on the politics and governmental impacts of public sector unions. Among their publications are "Public Sector Unions and the Costs of Government," and "Do Politicians Use Policy to Make Politics? The Case of Public Sector Labor Laws." Most recently, he has been engaged in a project on presidential power and American democracy with William G. Howell, which has led, among other things, to two books - Relic and Presidents, Populism, and the Crisis of American Democracy - with a third on the way, expected to be published in 2025, that explains how and why the presidency has become so powerful that, in the wrong hands, it has the capacity to take democracy down.

Moe is the William Bennett Munro professor of political science emeritus at Stanford University, a senior fellow emeritus at Stanford's Hoover Institution, and has been at Stanford for more than 40 years. He was chair of the political science department from 2004 to 2007.

== Selected works ==
=== Books and book chapters ===
- —— (1980). The Organization of Interests: Incentives and the Internal Dynamics of Political Interest Groups. University of Chicago Press. ISBN 0-226-53351-4.
- Chubb, John E.; —— (1990). Politics, Markets and America's Schools. Washington D.C.: Brookings Institution. ISBN 0-8157-1410-6.
- —— (1985). "The Politicized Presidency". In Chubb, John E.; Peterson, Paul E. (eds.). The New Direction in American Politics. Washington, D.C.: Brookings Institution. pp. 235–271. ISBN 0-8157-1406-8.
- Moe, Terry M. 1989. "The Politics of Bureaucratic Structure." In John E. Chubb and Paul E. Peterson, eds., Can the Government Govern? (Washington, D.C.: Brookings Institution Press): 267–329.
- Moe, Terry M. 2011. Special Interest: Teachers Unions and America's Public Schools (Washington, D.C: Brookings Institution Press).
- Moe, Terry M., and Susanne Wiborg, eds. 2017. The Comparative Politics of Education: Teachers Unions and Education Systems around the World (New York: Cambridge University Press).
- Moe, Terry M. 2019. The Politics of Institutional Reform: Katrina, Education, and the Second Face of Power (New York: Cambridge University Press).
- Howell, William G., and Moe, Terry M. 2016. Relic: Why the Constitution Undermines Effective Government—And Why We Need a More Powerful Presidency (New York: Basic Books).
- Howell, William G., and Moe, Terry M. 2020. Presidents, Populism, and the Crisis of Democracy (Chicago: University of Chicago Press).

=== Journal articles ===
- —— (1984). "The New Economics of Organization". American Journal of Political Science. 28 (4). Midwest Political Science Association, Wiley: 739–777. doi:10.2307/2110997. ISSN 0092-5853. JSTOR 2110997. Full access available to users of The Wikipedia Library.
- —— (1990). "Political Institutions: The Neglected Side of the Story". Journal of Law, Economics, & Organization. 6. Oxford University Press: 213–253. doi:10.1093/jleo/6.special_issue.213. ISSN 8756-6222. JSTOR 764990. Full access available to users of The Wikipedia Library.
- Moe, Terry M. 2005. "Power and Political Institutions." Perspectives on Politics 3 (2): 215–233.
- Moe, Terry M. 2015. "Vested Interests and Political Institutions." Political Science Quarterly 130 (2): 277–318.
- Anzia, Sarah F., and Moe, Terry M. 2015. "Public Sector Unions and the Costs of Government." Journal of Politics 77 (1): 114–127.
- Anzia, Sarah F., and Moe, Terry M. 2016. "Do Politicians Use Policy to Make Politics? The Case of Public Sector Labor Laws." American Political Science Review 110 (4): 763–777.
- Howell, William G., and Moe, Terry M. 2023. "The Strongman Presidency and the Two Logics of Presidential Power." Presidential Studies Quarterly 53: 145–168.
