= Preetish Nijhawan =

American businessman (died 2024)

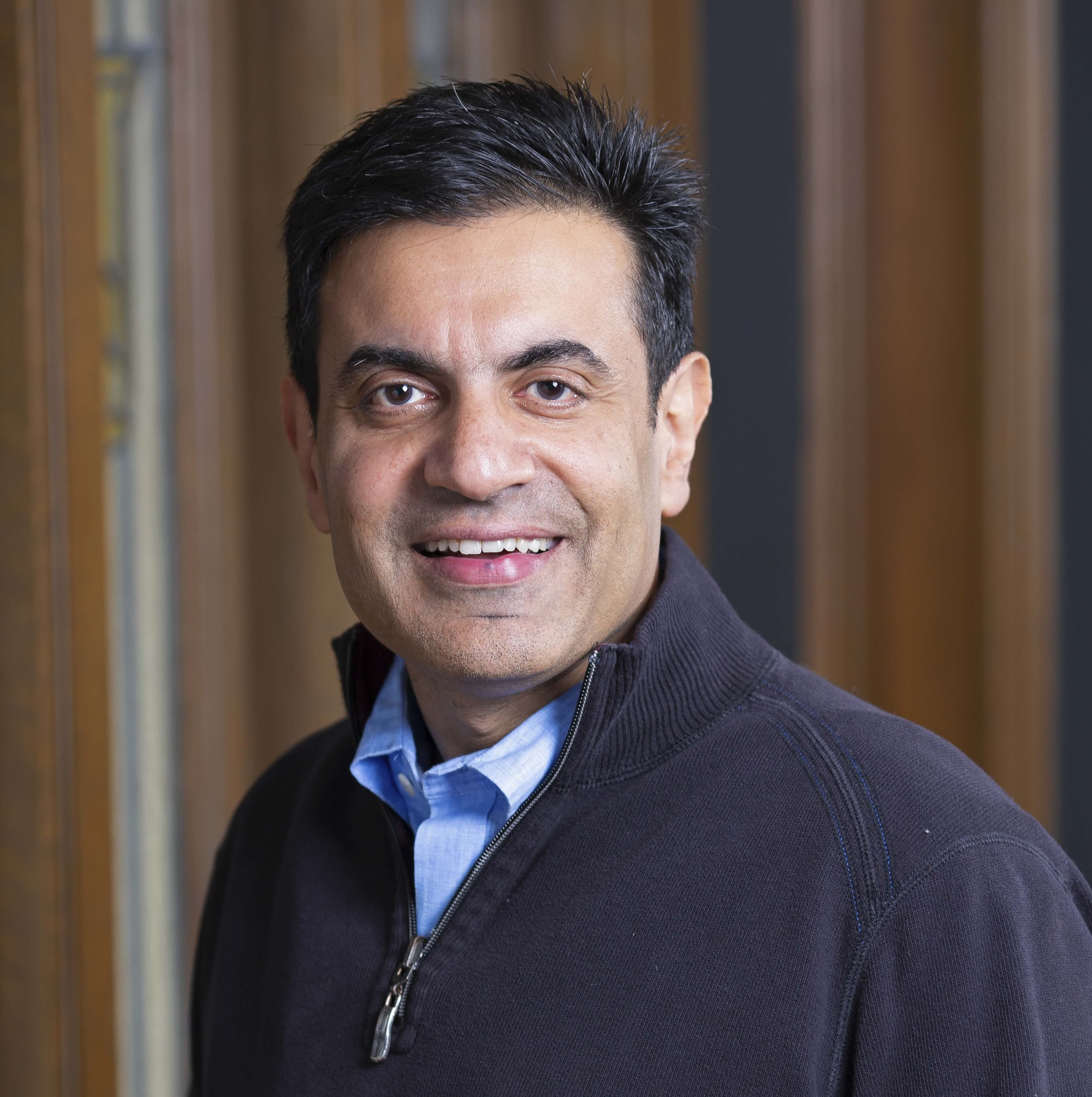
- Died: 31 August 2024
- Education: BITS, Pilani; USC Viterbi School of Engineering; MIT Sloan School of Management
- Occupations: Co-founder Cervin Ventures; Co-founder Akamai Technologies

Preetish Nijhawan was an Indian-American entrepreneur known for co-founding the internet company Akamai Technologies in 1998.

== Early life ==
Nijhawan studied at Hyderabad Public School, then received a Bachelor of Science degree from BITS, Pilani, a master's degree from the University of Southern California and an MBA from the MIT Sloan School of Management.

== Career ==
Before joining NeoEdge, Nijhawan was a Vice President at BMC Software and prior to that he was a co-founder and Vice President at iVita Corporation, and was a consultant for McKinsey & Company. Earlier in his career he also spent 6 years at Intel Corporation in engineering and management roles.

Preetish was Managing Director and co-founder of Cervin Ventures, a Venture Capital firm that invests in very early-stage software companies. Nijhawan previously worked for a group of companies (JME Software, Scalable Software and Neon Enterprise Software) as CFO. Prior to this, Nijhawan worked with NeoEdge Networks in Palo Alto, California as Vice President of Strategic Alliances where he led the development of the company's most important partnerships and distribution relationships.

Nijhawan was also the co-founder of local coffee shop "The Coffee Groundz" in the Midtown area of Houston, Texas.

He died on 31 August 2024 due to a heart attack.
