= OpenMarket =

Cloud-based mobile messaging service

OpenMarket, Inc.
- Type: Subsidiary
- Industry: Wireless technology
- Founded: 1999; 27 years ago, in Seattle, Washington
- Headquarters: Seattle, Washington
- Number of locations: 6
- Area served: Worldwide
- Key people: Jonathan Morgan (CEO) Jay Emmet (Former General Manager)
- Services: Enterprise mobile engagement Mobile messaging One-way and two-way global SMS; MMS; RCS; Consulting & Professional Services
- Number of employees: 275
- Parent: Infobip
- Website: openmarket.com

OpenMarket Inc. is a subsidiary of Infobip that provides cloud-based mobile messaging service to enterprises, including global one-way and two-way SMS, MMS, RCS, short codes, local numbers and text-enabled toll-free messaging. The company is headquartered in Seattle, Washington, United States, with offices in Detroit, London, Sydney, Pune and Guadalajara.

== History ==
OpenMarket began as part of Qpass, a technology company that specialized in providing the infrastructure for electronic payments. In February 2006, Qpass acquired Simplewire, a provider of mobile messaging, payments and other services. This began operations in 1999. In June 2006, Amdocs, acquired Qpass and separated the company into two divisions, OpenMarket became the division focused on enterprise mobile services. Later in June 2006, OpenMarket launched OpenMarket Exchange, a web-based system that enabled media companies and service providers to process direct-to-consumer mobile transactions.

On 23 March 2010, at the International CTIA Wireless conference, Amdocs announced the acquisition of MX Telecom, a London-based mobile messaging and payments aggregator for approximately $104 million. Amdocs acquired MX Telecom with the aim of expanding the OpenMarket business into new international markets with its CMX2 platform. In May 2010, OpenMarket announced enhancements to the CMX2 product, now known as the OpenMarket Mobile Engagement Platform. In late 2017, OpenMarket announced its expansion into RCS.

== About ==
OpenMarket offers its suite of mobile messaging products to enterprises globally in a variety of industry sectors, including retail, financial services, high tech, call center, logistics, travel and hospitality to support use cases across the organization such as customer feedback surveys, appointment reminders, emergency alerts, mobile coupons and secure PIN authentication. Servicing over 400 enterprises globally, the company processes more than one billion application-to-peer mobile messaging interactions per month, connecting businesses to over three billion users and six billion devices worldwide.

On 17 February 2016, OpenMarket announced the launch of its global mobile messaging partner program, which brings together third-party solutions for companies interested in leveraging functionality beyond basic SMS. In 2018, OpenMarket began offering Rich Communication Services (RCS).

== Surveys ==
In 2014, OpenMarket commissioned a survey by International Data Corporation (IDC) on how enterprises use text messaging to communicate with their customers and employees. The survey was done with 600 respondents in the US, UK and eight countries in Europe and Asia.

In March 2016, Retail Week and OpenMarket surveyed 1,000 consumers aged 18–34 to find out more about their communication preferences on mobile. The results showed that 38% of respondents want to be contacted by retailers via SMS, with 83% of them wanting to get order confirmations, delivery information and click-and-collect information.

In April 2016, OpenMarket conducted a survey among 500 millennials on their communication preferences. The survey revealed that over 75% millennials prefer texting over talking on phone.

== See also ==
- Short Message Service
- Multimedia Messaging Service
- Rich Communication Services
