= Akamai Technologies =

American computer networking company

Akamai Technologies, Inc.

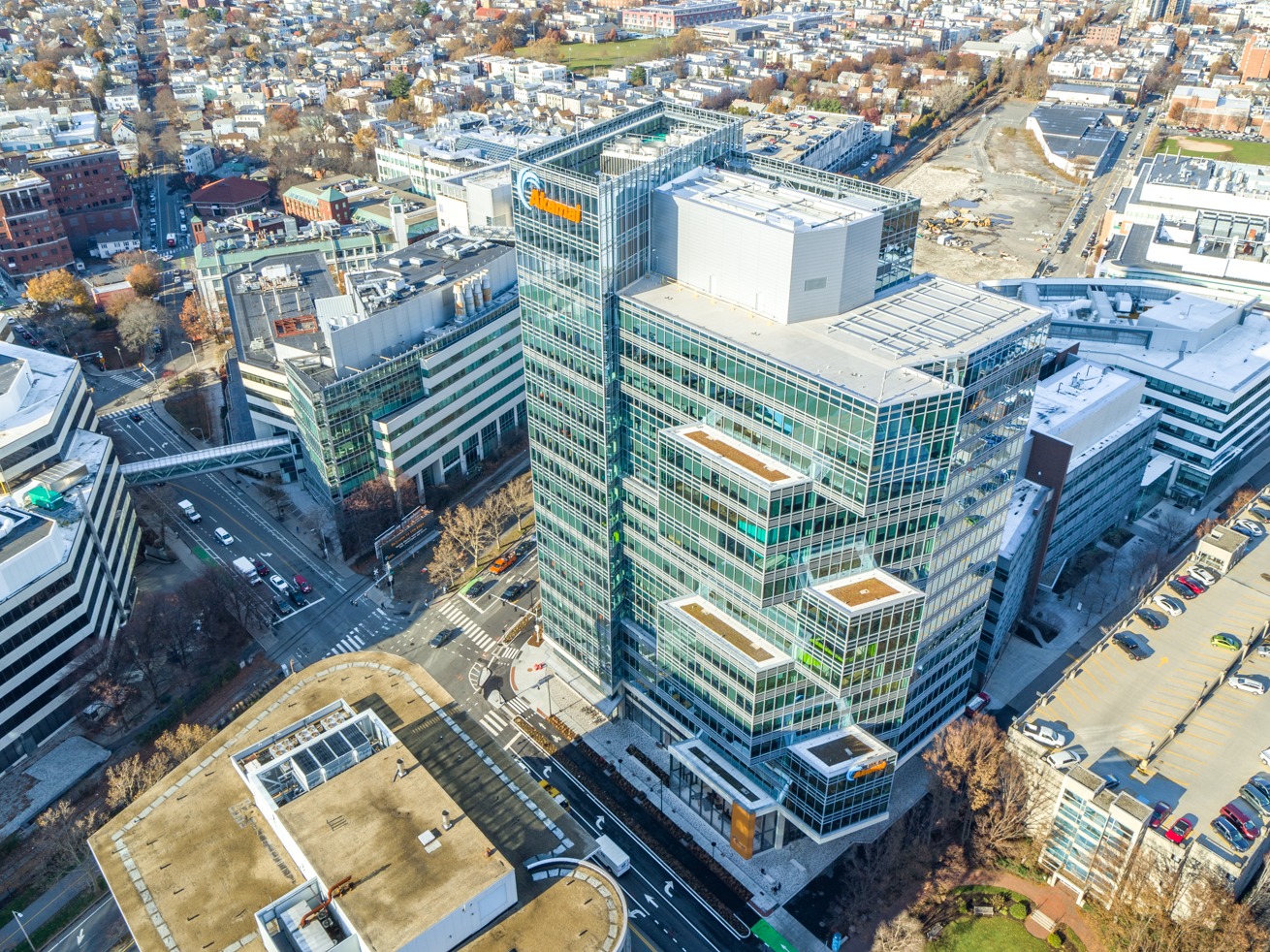
- Headquarters in Cambridge, Massachusetts
- Type: Public
- Traded as: Nasdaq: AKAM; S&P 500 component
- Industry: Internet; Cloud computing
- Founded: 1998; 28 years ago
- Founders: Daniel Lewin; F. Thomson Leighton; Randall Kaplan; Preetish Nijhawan; Jonathan Seelig
- Headquarters: Cambridge, Massachusetts, U.S.
- Key people: F. Thomson Leighton (CEO); Daniel Hesse (chairman)
- Revenue: ▲US$4.21 billion (2025)
- Operating income: ▲US$567 million (2025)
- Net income: ▼US$452 million (2025)
- Total assets: ▲US$11.5 billion (2025)
- Total equity: ▲US$4.98 billion (2025)
- Number of employees: 11,000 (2025)
- ASN: 20940
- Website: www.akamai.com

Akamai Technologies, Inc. is an American company specializing in content delivery network (CDN), cybersecurity, DDoS mitigation, and cloud services. It is headquartered in Cambridge, Massachusetts.

== History ==
The company was named after the Hawaiian word akamai, which translates to "clever", "smart", and "skill" amongst other meanings. Co-founder Daniel M. Lewin found the term in a Hawaiian–English dictionary after a colleague's suggestion.

Akamai Technologies entered the 1998 MIT $50K competition (equivalent to $100K in 2025) with a business proposition based on their research regarding consistent hashing and was selected as a finalist. By August 1998, the team had developed a working prototype. Jonathan Seelig and Randall Kaplan joined F. Thomson Leighton and Daniel Lewin as founders, and Akamai Technologies was incorporated on August 20, 1998.

In late 1998 and early 1999, a group of business professionals and scientists joined the founding team. These included, Paul Sagan, former president of New Media for Time Inc., and George Conrades, former chairman and chief executive officer of BBN Corp. and senior vice president of US operations for IBM. Conrades became chief executive officer of Akamai in April 1999. The company launched its commercial service in April 1999 and was listed on the NASDAQ Stock Market starting October 29, 1999.

On July 1, 2001, Akamai was added to the Russell 3000 Index and Russell 2000 Index.

On September 11, 2001, co-founder Daniel M. Lewin died in the September 11 attacks at the age of 31, when he was stabbed by one of the hijackers aboard American Airlines Flight 11, the first plane to crash into the World Trade Center. He was seated closest to the hijackers and may have tried to stop them.

Arabic news network Al Jazeera was an Akamai customer from March 28, 2003 to April 2, 2003, when Akamai decided to end the relationship, which the network's English-language managing editor claimed was due to "political pressure".

In 2005, Paul Sagan was named chief executive officer of Akamai, taking over from Conrades. Sagan worked to differentiate Akamai from its competitors by expanding its breadth of services. Under his leadership, it grew to $1.37 billion in revenue.

In July 2007, Akamai was added to the S&P 500 index.

In 2013, co-founder Tom Leighton was elected chief executive officer, replacing Sagan.

In 2013, the Securities and Exchange Commission charged a former executive at Akamai Technologies for illegally tipping non-public information about the company's financial predicament as part of the insider trading scheme operated by now-imprisoned Galleon Management hedge fund founder Raj Rajaratnam. In 2014 it was reported that the National Security Agency and Federal Bureau of Investigation used Facebook's Akamai CDN to collect information on Facebook users.

On February 9, 2021, Akamai announced that it would reorganize into two internal groups – Security Technology and Edge Technology. It also re-established the role of chief technology officer and named Robert Blumofe to that role. Long-time chief security officer (CSO) Andy Ellis announced he would leave in March 2021.

Akamai's headquarters are in Kendall Square. It started in Technology Square and later expanded to multiple buildings in Cambridge Center. It consolidated its offices in a purpose-built building at 145 Broadway in December 2019.

The company's cloud infrastructure services primarily consist of compute and storage solutions developed based on Linode, a cloud hosting provider acquired by Akamai for $900 million in 2022.

=== Akamai Intelligent Edge Platform ===
The Akamai Intelligent Platform is a distributed cloud computing platform that operates worldwide, a network of over approximately 365,000 servers in more than 135 countries. These servers reside on roughly 1,350 of the world's networks, gathering real-time information about traffic, congestion, and trouble spots. Each Akamai server is equipped with proprietary software that uses complex algorithms to process requests from nearby users.

=== Content delivery process ===
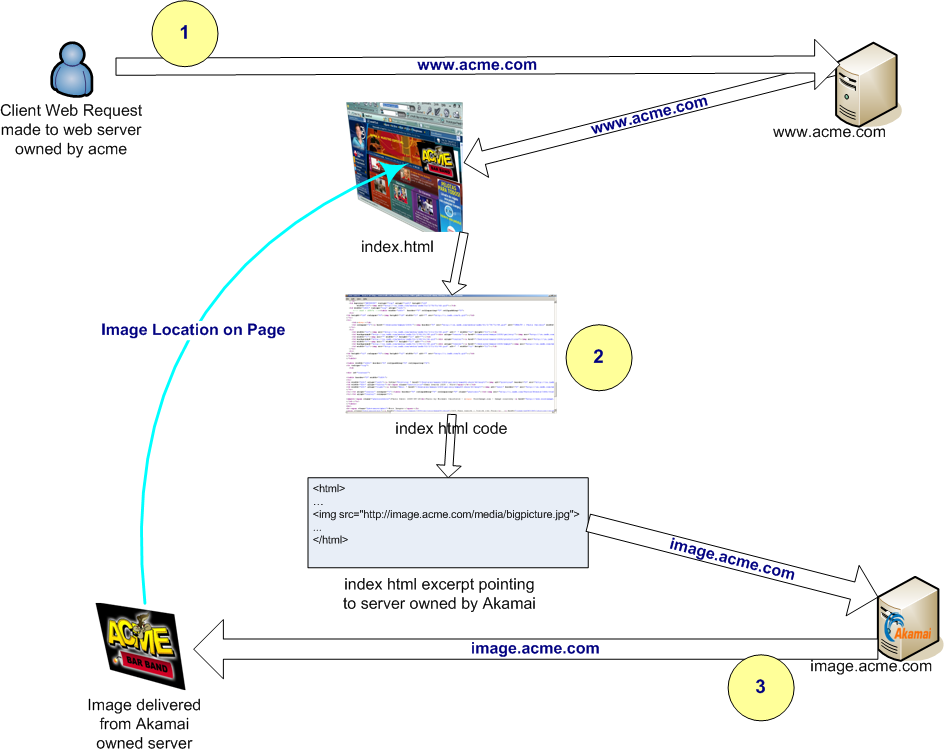
Akamai content delivery to a user

The content delivery process begins with a user submitting a request to a browser. When a user enters a URL, a DNS request is triggered to Akamai's authoritative DNS, and an IP address is retrieved. With the IP address, the browser can then directly contact the Akamai edge server for subsequent requests. In a content delivery network (CDN) structure, the domain name of the URL is translated by the mapping system into the IP address of an edge server to serve the content to the user.

Akamai delivers web content over its Intelligent Platform by transparently mirroring elements such as HTML, CSS, software downloads, and media objects from customers' servers. The Akamai server is automatically chosen depending on the type of content and the user's network location. The servers are located in more than 200 countries and territories. Receiving content from a server nearer to the user allows for faster downloads and less vulnerability to network congestion. Akamai claims to provide better scalability by delivering the content over the last mile from servers close to end-users, avoiding the middle-mile bottleneck of the Internet. The Download Delivery product line includes HTTP downloads for large downloadable objects, a customizable application for consumers, and analytics tools with metrics that monitor and report on the download process.

=== Peer-to-peer networking ===
In addition to using its own servers, Akamai delivers certain content from other end-users' computers, in the form of peer-to-peer networking.

=== OPEN Initiative ===
On October 9, 2013, Akamai announced its Open Initiative at the 2013 Akamai Edge Conference. OPEN allows customers and partners to develop and customize how they interact with the Akamai Intelligent Platform. Its key components include system and development operations integration, real-time big data integration, and a single-point user interface.

== Acquisitions ==
Date	Acquisition	Paid
February 10, 2000	Network24 Communications	621,000 shares of common stock and $12.5 million in cash
April 20, 2000	InterVU Inc	10.0 million shares of common stock
July 25, 2000	CallTheShots, Inc.	aggregate purchase price of $3.7 million
June 10, 2005	Speedera Networks, Inc.	10.6 million shares of Akamai common stock and options to purchase 1.7 million shares of Akamai common stock
December 13, 2006	Nine Systems, Inc.	aggregate purchase price of $157.5 million
March 13, 2007	Netli Inc. (Netli)	aggregate purchase price of $154.4 million
April 12, 2007	Red Swoosh Inc	aggregate purchase price of $18.7 million
November 3, 2008	aCerno Inc.	aggregate purchase price of $90.8 million
June 10, 2010	Velocitude LLC	aggregate purchase price of $12 million
February 7, 2012	Blaze Software, Inc.	aggregate purchase price of $19.3 million
March 6, 2012	Cotendo, Inc.	aggregate purchase price of $278.9 million
September 13, 2012	FastSoft, Inc.	aggregate purchase price of $14.4 million
December 4, 2012	Verivue, Inc.	aggregate purchase price of $30.9 million
November 8, 2013	Velocius Networks	aggregate purchase price of $4.3 million
February 2014	cyber security provider Prolexic Technologies	aggregate purchase price of $390 million
February 2015	Xerocole Inc., a domain name system technology company	
April 6, 2015	Octoshape, a cloud OTT IPTV service provider	undisclosed amount
November 2, 2015	Bloxx, a provider of Secure Web Gateway (SWG) technology	undisclosed amount
September 28, 2016	Concord Systems, a provider of technology for the high performance processing of data at scale	undisclosed amount
October 4, 2016	Soha Systems, an enterprise secure access delivered as a service provider	undisclosed amount
December 19, 2016	Cyberfend, a bot and automation detection solutions provider	undisclosed amount
March 29, 2017	SOASTA, a digital performance management company based in Mountain View, CA	undisclosed all-cash amount
October 11, 2017	Nominum, a carrier-grade DNS and DHCP provider and one of the major players in the creation of the modern DNS	an undisclosed all-cash amount
January 24, 2019	CIAM provider Janrain	
October 2019	security software provider ChameleonX	$20 million
October 27, 2020	IoT and mobile security provider Asavie	
February 1, 2021	Inverse Inc. a Montreal Canadian based security company making an open source network access controller (NAC) called PacketFence	
September 29, 2021	Guardicore	$600 million
February 15, 2022	Linode	$900 million
June 25, 2024	API Security vendor Noname Security	$450 million
December 1, 2025	Function-as-a-Service Company Fermyon	

== Key scientific publications ==
These papers in scientific conferences and journals describe Akamai's technology in greater detail:

- Karger, D., Lehman, E., Leighton, T., Panigrahy, R., Levine, M., Lewin, D. "Consistent Hashing and Random Trees: Distributed Caching Protocols for Relieving Hot Spots on the World Wide Web". ACM Symposium on Theory of Computing, 1997, pp. 654–663.
- J. Dilley, B. Maggs, J. Parikh, H. Prokop, R. Sitaraman, and B. Weihl. "Globally Distributed Content Delivery", IEEE Internet Computing, September/October 2002, pp. 50–58.
- Bruce Maggs and Ramesh Sitaraman. "Algorithmic nuggets in content delivery". ACM SIGCOMM Computer Communication Review, Volume=45, Issue=3, 2015.
- F. Chen, R. Sitaraman, and M. Torres. "End-User Mapping: Next Generation Request Routing for Content Delivery". ACM SIGCOMM conference, Aug 2015.
- Kyle Schomp, Onkar Bhardwaj, Eymen Kurdoglu, Mashooq Muhaimen, and Ramesh K. Sitaraman. "Akamai DNS: Providing Authoritative Answers to the World's Queries", ACM SIGCOMM conference, Aug 2020.
- D. Gillman, Y. Lin, B. Maggs and R. K. Sitaraman. "Protecting Websites from Attack with Secure Delivery Networks", IEEE Computer, vol. 48, no. 4, pp. 26–34, Apr. 2015.

== See also ==
- Akamai Techs., Inc. v. Limelight Networks, Inc.
