= The Journal of Law, Economics, & Organization =

- Discipline: Law and economics
- Language: English
- Edited by: Andrea Prat

Publication details
- History: 1985-present
- Publisher: Oxford University Press
- Frequency: Triannual
- Impact factor: 1.212 (2016)

Standard abbreviations
- Bluebook: J.L. Econ. & Org.
- ISO 4: J. Law Econ. Organ.

Indexing
- ISSN: 8756-6222 (print); 1465-7341 (web)
- LCCN: 85652050
- OCLC no.: 981619801

Links
- Journal homepage; Online access; Online archive

The Journal of Law, Economics, & Organization is a triannual peer-reviewed academic journal covering law and economics. It was established in 1985 and is published by Oxford University Press. The founding editors were Oliver E. Williamson and Jerry L. Mashaw. It is supported by the Olin Center for Studies in Law, Economics, and Public Policy at Yale Law School. The editor-in-chief is Andrea Prat (Columbia University). According to the Journal Citation Reports, the journal has a 2016 impact factor of 1.212, ranking it 126th out of 347 journals in the category "Economics" and 49th out of 147 in the category "Law".
