= The Justice Ball =

The Justice Ball is an annual fundraiser for the Los Angeles based charity, Bet Tzedek Legal Services - The House of Justice. All net proceeds from the event directly benefit Bet Tzedek.

Since its inception in 1996, The Justice Ball has become a fundraiser that supports the causes of legal aid and social justice while bringing young professionals together for a phenomenal evening of music, dance, and great networking. Over the last 13 years, the event has raised over $4 million of the organization’s annual operating budget.

The 14th Annual Justice Ball was on June 26, 2010 at the Hollywood Palladium. The event featured a live mashup by headliners, Dave Navarro and DJ Skribble.

== History ==
Timeline of past Justice Ball performers:

- 2015: Travie McCoy
- 2014: Taryn Manning
- 2013: Masquerade ball for everyone
- 2012: Jermaine Dupri
- 2011: Nelly
- 2010: Dave Navarro and DJ Skribble
- 2009: DJ AM
- 2008: The Psychedelic Furs
- 2007: Violent Femmes
- 2006: The Go-Go's
- 2005: Ozomatli
- 2004: Sugar Ray, Stephan Jenkins of Third Eye Blind
- 2003: Macy Gray
- 2002: Jason Bentley, Elan, Smitten
- 2001: The B-52's
- 2000: Billy Idol
- 1999: Berlin
- 1998: The M-80's and Boogie Knights
- 1997: The M-80's and Boogie Knights

== News Articles ==
- Flashback with the Violent Femmes-The Jewish Journal
- California Lawyer
- Los Angeles Daily Journal
- Hollywood Reporter
- The Daily News
- Backstage
- The Jewish Journal
