= F. Thomson Leighton =

American computer scientist (born 1956)

Frank Thomson Leighton
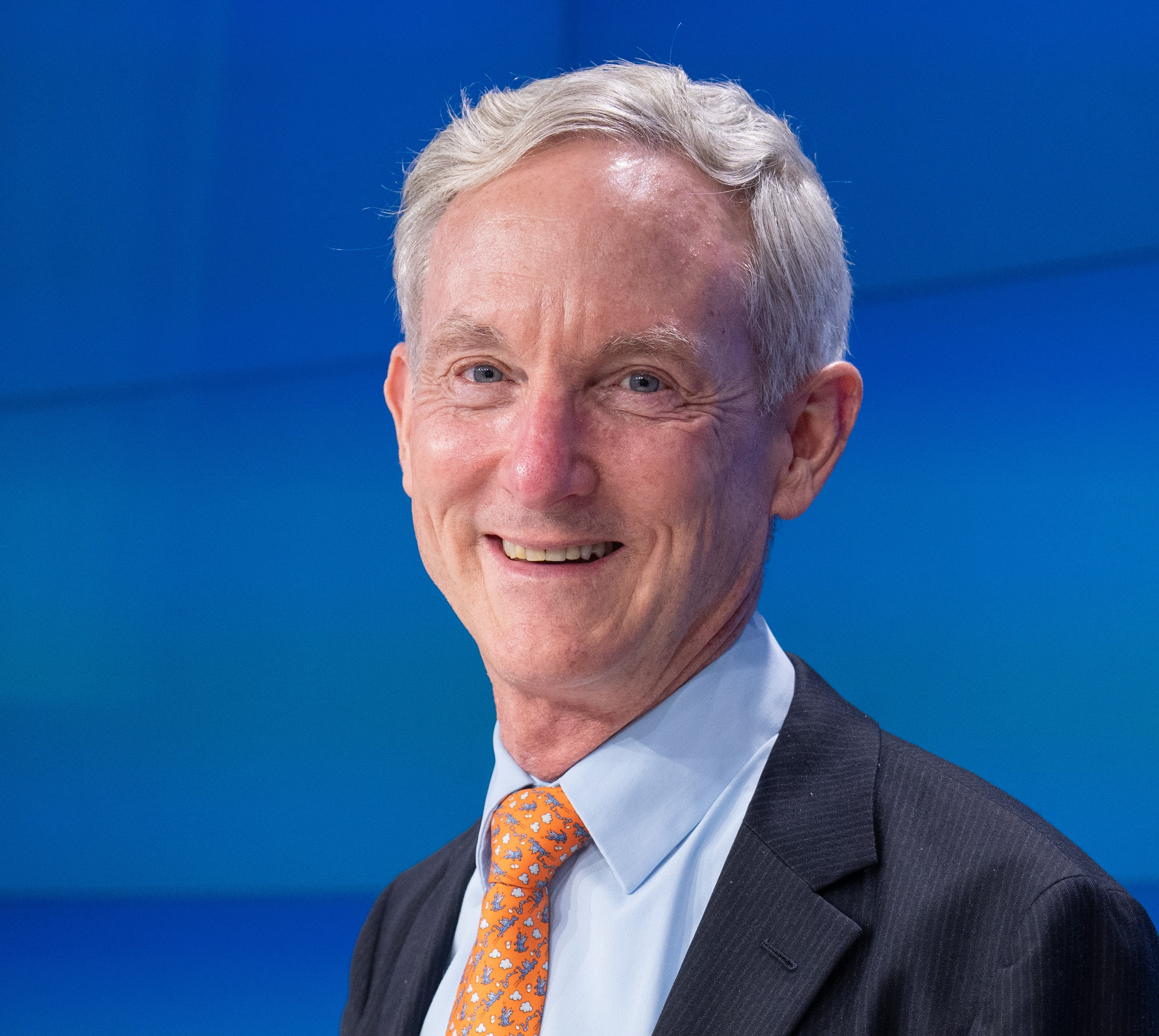
- Leighton in 2022
- Born: October 28, 1956 (age 70)
- Education: Princeton University (BSE); Massachusetts Institute of Technology (PhD)
- Spouse: Bonnie Berger
- Awards: IEEE John von Neumann Medal (2023); Marconi Prize (2018)
- Scientific career
- Fields: Applied mathematics
- Workplaces: Akamai Technologies; Massachusetts Institute of Technology
- Thesis: Layouts for the shuffle-exchange graph and lower bound techniques for VLSI (1981)
- Doctoral advisor: Gary Lee Miller
- Doctoral students: Peter Shor, Mohammad Hajiaghayi, Robert Kleinberg, Satish Rao

Frank Thomson "Tom" Leighton (born 1956) is an American mathematician and computer scientist who is the CEO of Akamai Technologies, the company he co-founded with Daniel Lewin in 1998, and a professor of applied mathematics at the Massachusetts Institute of Technology (MIT). He is a member of the Computer Science and Artificial Intelligence Laboratory (CSAIL) at MIT.

== Early life and education ==
Leighton's father was a U.S. Navy colleague and friend of Admiral Hyman G. Rickover, the father of naval nuclear propulsion and a founder of the Research Science Institute (RSI). His brother, David T. Leighton, is a professor at the University of Notre Dame specializing in transport phenomena.

As a senior in high school, Leighton won second prize at the 1974 Science Talent Search (STS) for his project on a computational algorithm to predict prime number sequences. He received his B.S.E. in electrical engineering from Princeton University in 1978, followed by his Ph.D. in mathematics from MIT in 1981, advised by Gary Lee Miller.

== Career ==
Leighton discovered a solution to free up web congestion using applied mathematics and distributed computing.

Leighton worked on algorithms for network applications and has published over 100 papers on algorithms, cryptography, parallel architectures, distributed computing, combinatorial optimization, and graph theory. He also holds patents involving content delivery, Internet protocols, algorithms for networks, cryptography and digital rights management.

Leighton served on the President's Information Technology Advisory Committee (PITAC) from 2003 to 2005 and chaired its subcommittee on cybersecurity. He serves on the boards of trustees of the Society for Science & the Public (SSP) and the Center for Excellence in Education (CEE), and he has participated in the Distinguished Lecture Series at CEE's flagship program for high school students, the Research Science Institute (RSI).

== Awards and honors ==
- The Institute of Electrical and Electronics Engineers (IEEE) awarded Leighton the John von Neumann Medal in 2023 for "fundamental contributions to algorithm design and their application to content delivery networks."
- In 2018, Leighton won the Marconi Prize from the Marconi Society for "his fundamental contributions to the technology and establishment of content delivery networks".
- He was elected as an ACM Fellow in 2018 for "his leadership in the establishment of content delivery networks, and his contributions to algorithm design".
- In 2017, Leighton and Lewin were inducted into the National Inventors Hall of Fame, for Content Delivery Network methods.
- He is a Fellow of the American Academy of Arts and Sciences
- In 2012, Leighton became a fellow of the American Mathematical Society.
- In 2009, Leighton became a Fellow of the Society for Industrial and Applied Mathematics.
- In 2008, Leighton was appointed as a member of the United States National Academy of Sciences.
- In 2004, Leighton was elected a member of the National Academy of Engineering for contributions to the design of networks and circuits and for technology for Web content delivery.
- In 2001, Leighton received the IEEE Computer Society Charles Babbage Award.
- In 1981, Leighton was named the first winner of the Machtey Award.

== Personal life ==
He is married to the MIT professor Bonnie Berger, American mathematician and computer scientist, and they have two children.

== Books ==
- Mathematics for Computer Science (with Eric Lehman and Albert R. Meyer, 2010)
- Introduction to Parallel Algorithms and Architectures: Arrays, Trees, Hypercubes (Morgan Kaufmann, 1991), ISBN 1-55860-117-1.
- Complexity Issues in VLSI: Optimal layouts for the shuffle-exchange graph and other networks, (MIT Press, 1983), ISBN 0-262-12104-2.
