= Military Veterans in Journalism =

American nonprofit organization founded 2019

- Abbreviation: MVJ
- Formation: 2019; 7 years ago
- Type: 501(c)(3) nonprofit organization
- Tax ID no.: 83-4253287
- Purpose: Veterans and Journalism
- Headquarters: New York City, New York
- Location: United States
- Region served: Domestic
- Executive Director/Co-Founder: Zack Baddorf
- Executive Director/Co-Founder: Russell Midori
- Website: www.mvj.network

Military Veterans in Journalism (MVJ) is an American nonprofit organization established in 2019 to support military veterans and their family members pursuing careers in journalism. Founded by two military veterans, MVJ aims to bridge the gap between military service and the journalism industry by providing mentorship and job opportunities for veterans seeking news careers.

Incorporated in New York, MVJ offers a range of programs and initiatives to assist military veteran journalists. These include fellowships, career-enhancing events, and the MVJ Career Center, an online job portal directly connecting veterans with employment prospects in the field. In late 2020, the Knight Foundation granted MVJ its first significant grant of $250,000 to support its programs. Subsequent second grant in 2022 was $360,000. The Hollywood Foreign Press Association has since 2021 funded the MVJ mentorship program annually. The MVJ fellowship program receives support from various foundations and news organizations, including the Wyncote Foundation, CNN, The Texas Tribune, and McClatchy, among others. It has also teamed up with Poynter Institute from a grant by Craig Newmark Philanthropies.

MVJ engages in various initiatives designed to improve newsroom coverage of veterans issues and increase trust in media. MVJ runs a disability inclusion program, an effort to improve coverage of disabilities and disabled veterans sponsored by the Ford Foundation. The organization also offers journalism grants as part of this program, offering financial support to aspiring veteran journalists pursuing innovative media projects around disability issues. MVJ also runs a counter-disinformation initiative to investigate malicious information being spread to the military and veteran communities and counter it through trustworthy reporting by community members, with support from Craig Newmark, the MacArthur Foundation, and the Knight Foundation. MVJ also addresses specific challenges in national and local news coverage related to veterans and military issues.

The organization also hosts an annual journalism convention for reporters, newsroom leaders, and supporters of newsroom diversity to connect and network with military veteran journalists. Honored at its annual convention are the awardees of MVJ's Top 10 Veterans in Journalism, an annual contest recognizing exemplary contributions and achievements by veterans in the media industry. October 2023 has seen its third convention.

Its Advisory Council has included American journalists, including:

- Barbara Starr
- Howard Altman
- Jake Tapper
- Jeff Jarvis
- LaSharah Bunting
- Martin Baron

== See also ==
- Military Reporters & Editors, a non-profit organization for journalists covering the military, national security and homeland defense.
- Military Veterans Advocacy
- United States Department of Veterans Affairs
- United States military veteran suicide
