= Julia Angwin =

American investigative journalist

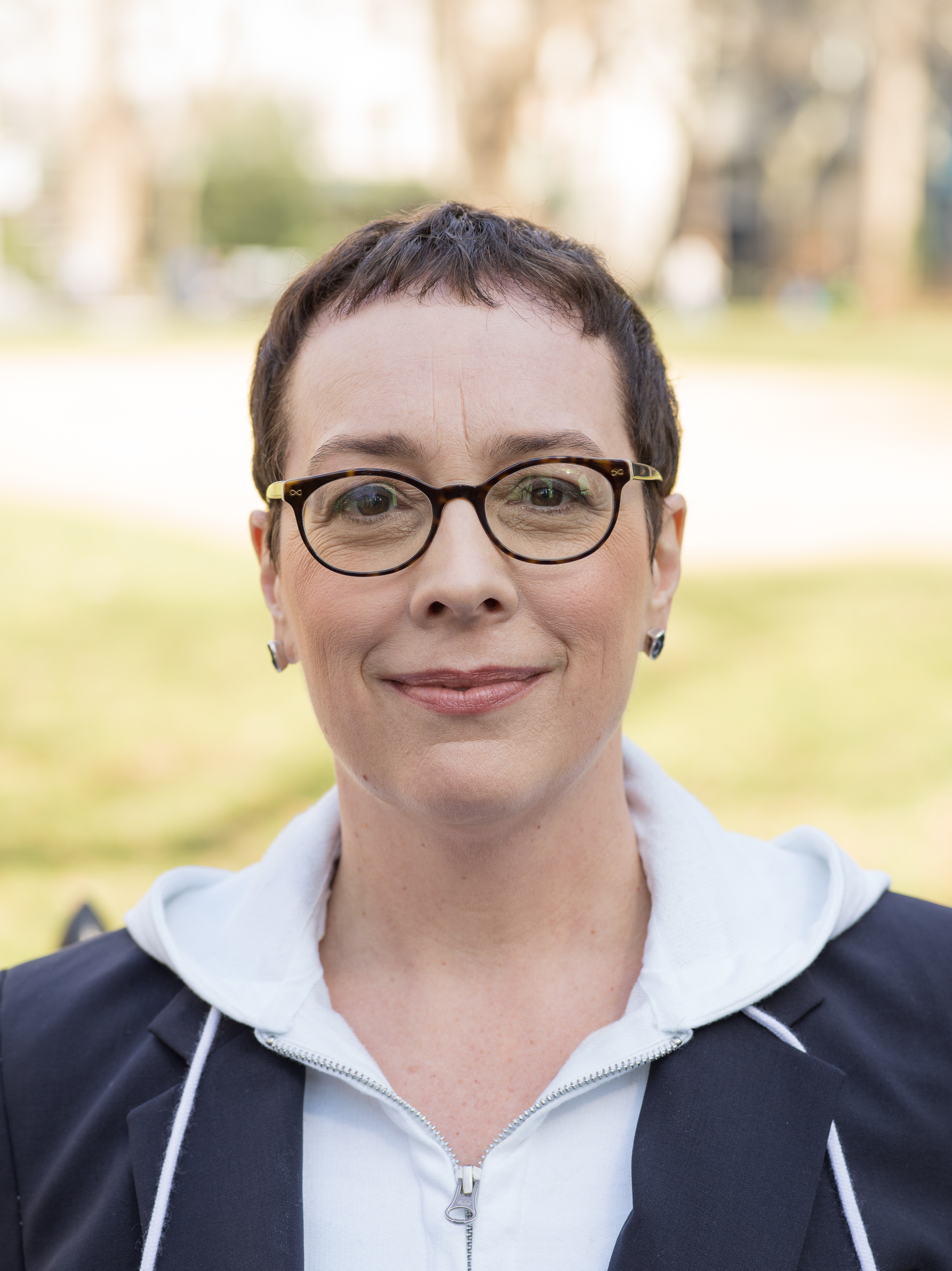
- Angwin in 2020
- Born: Champaign, Illinois, U.S.
- Education: University of Chicago (BA); Columbia University (MBA)
- Occupations: Investigative journalist, co-founder and editor-in-chief of The Markup
- Spouse: Vijay Modi
- Children: 2
- Awards: Pulitzer Prize for Explanatory Reporting (2003)
- Website: www.juliaangwin.com

Julia Angwin is an American investigative journalist, author, and entrepreneur. She co-founded and was editor-in-chief of The Markup, a nonprofit newsroom that investigates the impact of technology on society. She was a staff reporter at the New York bureau of The Wall Street Journal from 2000 to 2013, during which time she was on a team that won the Pulitzer Prize in journalism. She worked as a senior reporter at ProPublica from 2014 to April 2018, during which time she was a finalist for the Pulitzer Prize.

Angwin is the author of three non-fiction books, Stealing MySpace: The Battle to Control the Most Popular Website in America (2009), Dragnet Nation (2014), and On Courage: How to be a Dissident in an Age of Fear (2026).

== Early life and education ==
Angwin was born in Champaign, Illinois, to university professor parents who moved to Silicon Valley in 1974 to work in the emerging personal computer industry. She grew up in Palo Alto, California, where she learned to code in the fifth grade. During summers, she worked at the Hewlett-Packard Demo Center in Cupertino. Angwin graduated from the University of Chicago in 1992 with a B.A. in mathematics. She was named a Knight-Bagehot Fellow at the Columbia University Graduate School of Journalism in 1998. She then completed her MBA at Columbia University with a concentration in accounting in 1999.

== Career ==
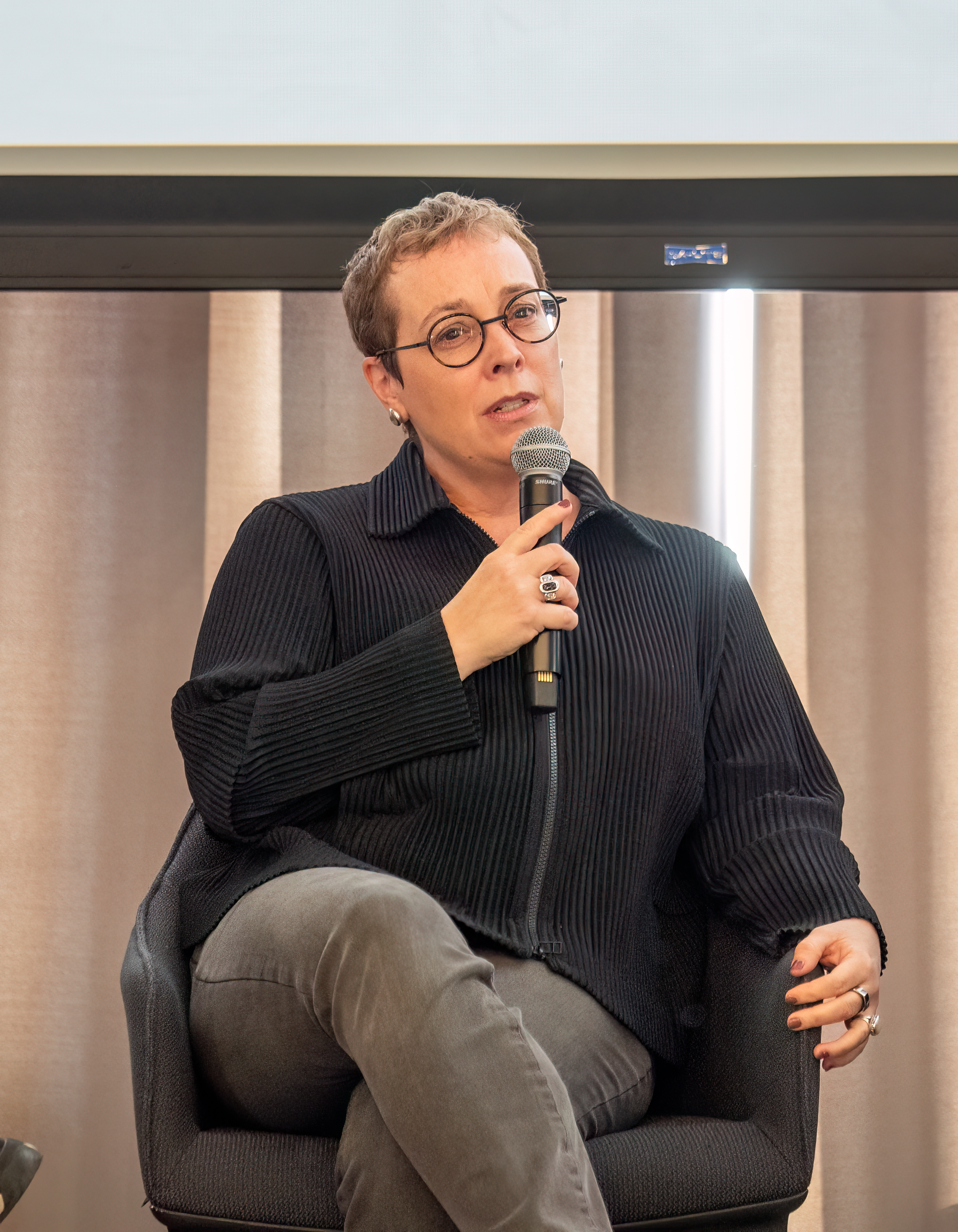
Angwin speaking at a Wikipedia event at the Columbia Journalism School in 2024

Angwin got her start in journalism as an undergrad at the University of Chicago, where she served as editor-in-chief of the college newspaper, The Chicago Maroon, from 1991 to 1992. Upon graduation, she returned to California, where she worked briefly as a business writer for the Contra Costa Times. She then moved to Washington D.C., to work as a reporter for States News Service covering Congress for regional newspapers.

She joined the San Francisco Chronicle in 1996 as a technology reporter, where her coverage of the software industry included several stories of the United States v. Microsoft Corp. case. She also led an investigation that revealed how few Blacks and Latinos were employed in Silicon Valley companies and that many leading tech firms had been cited by the United States Department of Labor for affirmative action violations.

In 2000, The Wall Street Journal hired her as a staff reporter covering business and technology from their New York bureau. During her 13 years at the Journal, Angwin broke stories, led important investigations, and published numerous exposes into the growing tech sector.

An article by Angwin and Geoffrey A. Fowler, entitled "Volunteers Log Off as Wikipedia Ages" on the "unprecedented numbers of the millions" of Wikipedia editors that were quitting, was featured on the front page of the Journal in 2009.

From 2010 to 2013, she led an investigative team that published the Wall Street Journal's "What They Know" series, which exposed how privacy was being eroded with most people completely unaware that it was happening.

Angwin left The Wall Street Journal in 2014 to join the investigative, nonprofit newsroom ProPublica as a senior reporter and investigative journalist. In 2016, Angwin was lead author of an article revealing machine bias against Black people in criminal risk assessment that used machine learning systems.

In a 2016 article entitled "Google Has Quietly Dropped Ban on Personally Identifiable Web Tracking", Angwin revealed that Google had changed its privacy policy allowing Google to merge users' personally identifiable information. Following publication of her article, Google announced that this precluded advertisement targeting through Gmail keywords.

== The Markup ==
In April 2018, Angwin and Jeff Larson left ProPublica to found The Markup, described on their website as a "nonpartisan, nonprofit newsroom" that will produce "data-centered journalism" to uncover "societal harms of technology". They were joined by Sue Gardner, as a co-founder, and several ProPublica staff members. Harvard University–based NiemanLab described Angwin and Larson as a "journalist-programmer team" at ProPublica who uncovered stories such as "how algorithms are biased".

In support of The Markup's mission to investigate technology and its effect on society, Craig Newmark committed $20 million to the publication alongside philanthropic gifts from the Knight Foundation, the Ford Foundation, the MacArthur Foundation, and the Ethics and Governance of Artificial Intelligence Initiative, a joint project of the MIT Media Lab and the Berkman Klein Center for Internet & Society.

In April 2019, she was dismissed from The Markup. Five of the seven editorial staff immediately resigned in support of her, and over 145 journalists and researchers signed a letter of support. In August, she was reinstated in her role as editor-in-chief and The Markup was reformed with the original editorial staff.

In the following months, Angwin was joined by a new leadership team including public radio veteran, Evelyn Larrubia as managing editor, and free speech lawyer, Nabiha Syed, as president. The Markup began publishing on February 25, 2020, with a staff of 17 reporters, editors and engineers. Since its launch, the site has published numerous investigations examining issues like data privacy, disinformation, and algorithmic bias, and the role that the internet's most powerful platforms play in facilitating those harms. It developed and launched sophisticated custom forensic tools in service of investigating issues that would otherwise remain hidden, including Blacklight, a privacy inspector, and Citizen Browser, a project to inspect Facebook's algorithms.

In 2022, Angwin was replaced by Sisi Wei as editor-in-chief. In February 2023, Angwin left The Markup.

== Books ==
Angwin is the author of Stealing MySpace: The Battle to Control the Most Popular Website in America and Dragnet Nation. In his New York Times "Sunday Book Review" of Stealing MySpace, Michael Agger described Angwin's "meticulously" detailed description of Rupert Murdoch's purchase of MySpace in 2005 from Intermix Media despite competition from News Corp and Viacom, as "so granular that it passes through boring into surreal." The Washington Post's Scott Rosenberg compared Stealing MySpace to Kara Swisher's There Must be a Pony in Here Somewhere: The AOL Time Warner debacle and the quest for the digital future. The Economist, Kirkus Reviews, and the Los Angeles Times gave Dragnet Nation favorable reviews.

In an interview with Bill Moyers about Dragnet Nation in 2014, Angwin described reporters as "prime targets for Internet snooping" and "the canary in the coal mine" of internet privacy—the first to feel the "impact of total surveillance." She said that as "watch dogs for democracy," journalists need to protect their sources. In a 2014 interview with Kirkus Reviews's Neha Sharma, Angwin said that she had become aware of data scraping while researching Stealing MySpace. To protect her own digital content, she began using Tails.

Her third book, On Courage: How to be a Dissident in an Age of Fear (2026), was co-written with Ami Fields-Meyer. It originated as a 2025 essay for The New Yorker titled "So You Want to Be a Dissident?" The book draws on personal accounts of dissidents worldwide to describe how individuals and groups can resist political repression both alone and together. It uses examples from the civil rights movement, Czechoslovakia, Hong Kong, and Russia. The book also discusses nonviolent tactics people can use for resisting authoritarianism in their own communities. These include building networks of trust and mutual support, organizing boycotts, securing communication through layered encryption, crowdsourcing information about threats, and exposing flaws and inconsistencies in the system.

== Awards ==
Angwin was one of The Wall Street Journal's staff reporters whose stories on the history and impact of corporate scandals in the United States, were acknowledged with a Pulitzer Prize for Explanatory Reporting in 2003.

She shared the 2011 Gerald Loeb Award for Online Enterprise for the story "What They Know."

Angwin was awarded a Scripps Howard award for Digital Innovation in 2017 alongside four colleagues at ProPublica for their investigative series entitled Machine Bias, which examined how computer-generated algorithms used to predict criminality perpetuate racial biases

In 2018, Angwin and her team's work on her “Automating Hate” series at ProPublica won the Loeb Award for beat reporting. That series uncovered secret guidelines used by Facebook to inconsistently distinguish between hate speech and political expression.

She shared Gerald Loeb Award for Beat Reporting in 2018 for the story "Automating Hate."

== Personal life ==
Angwin lives in New York City with her husband, Vijay Modi, a professor of mechanical engineering at Columbia University, and two children. Her daughter started a cryptography business as a middle school student called DiceWARE Passwords, focused on selling secure handwritten passwords.
