= LaSharah Bunting =

American journalist

- Occupations: Editor and journalist

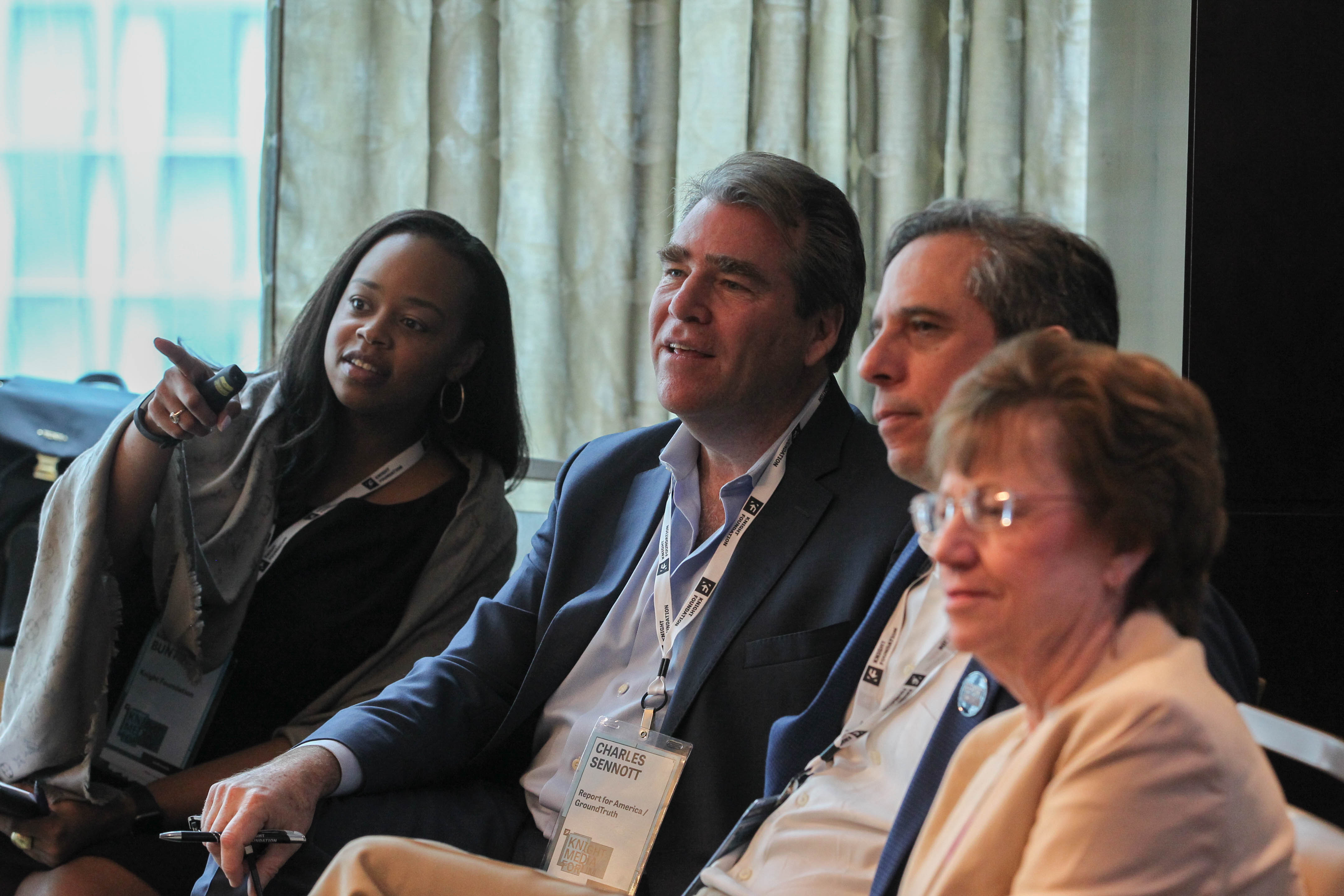
LaSharah Bunting of the Knight Foundation, Charles Sennott, Steven Waldman of Report for America, and Marilyn Thompson of ProPublica during a breakout session at the 2019 Knight Foundation Media Forum

LaSharah Bunting is an editor and journalist who is CEO and executive director of the Online News Association. She previously worked for The New York Times.

== Biography ==
Bunting graduated from the University of Nebraska–Lincoln in 2000 with a degree in journalism.

Bunting worked at The New York Times for 14 years and was the senior editor of digital transformation and recruitment when she left as part of a restructuring plan in July 2017. Bunting was noted as one of the highest ranking African Americans in the newsroom at her departure, and was one of seven high-profile women of color who left the Times in 2017, leaving few people of color at the management level.

Bunting joined the Knight Foundation in August 2017. After working at the Knight Foundation, she worked at Simon & Schuster. She became CEO and executive director of the Online News Association in 2023.
