= Richard L. Fox =

American lawyer

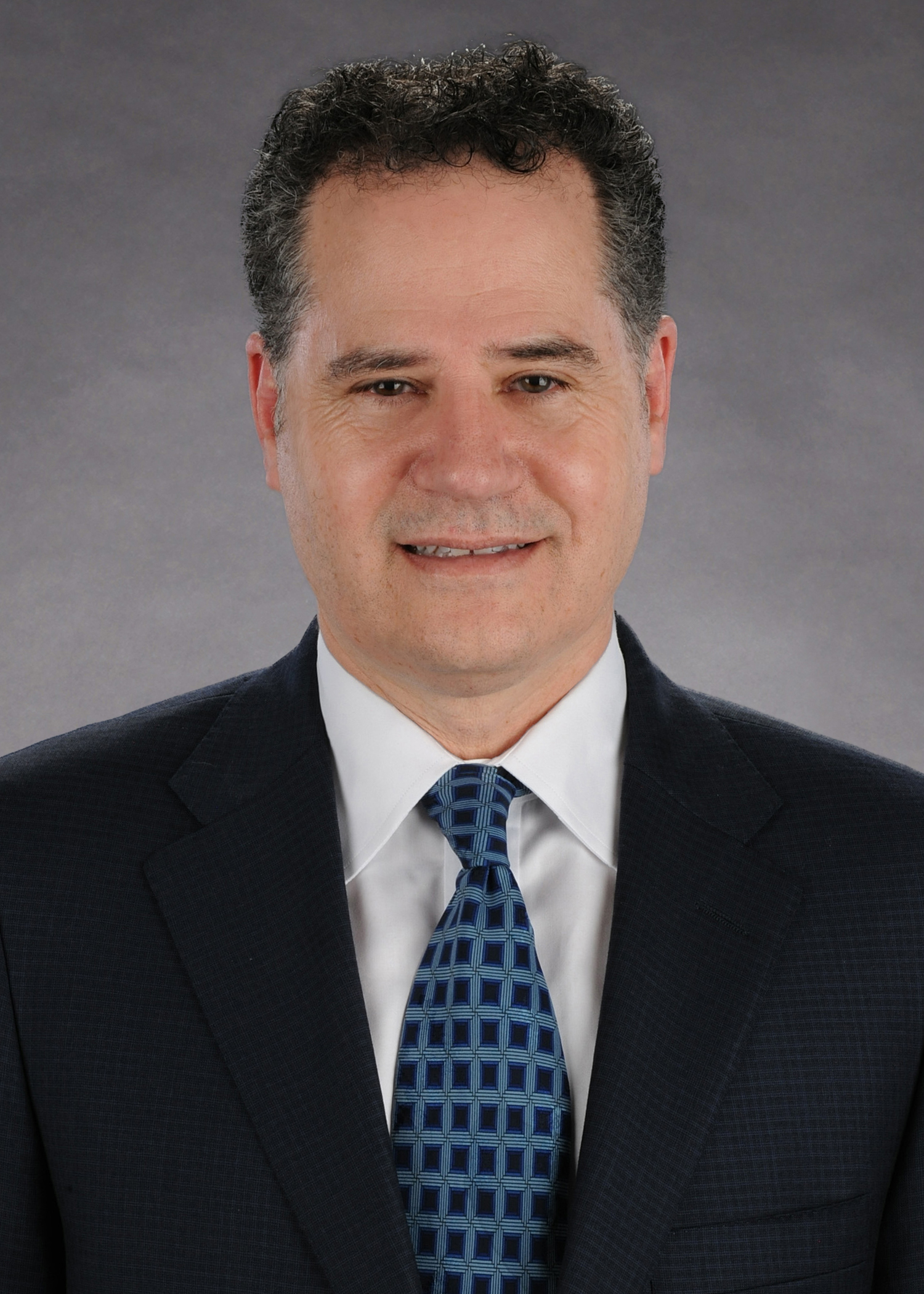

Personal details
- Born: Philadelphia, Pennsylvania, U.S.
- Education: Temple University (BBA, JD); New York University (LLM)
- Occupation: Tax attorney and author

Richard L. Fox is an American author and attorney, best known for his work with large estates, and philanthropic planning.

Fox currently serves as the Founding Partner at The Law Offices of Richard L. Fox. He previously served as the head of the philanthropic and non-profit practice at the mid-sized firm Dilworth Paxson and a shareholder in the tax department of Buchanan Ingersoll & Rooney.

== Early life ==
Fox was born, and grew up, in Philadelphia, Pennsylvania. He attended Temple University and the Temple University Beasley School of Law where he received his BBA and JD. He went on to graduate with an LLM from New York University.

== Legal career ==
In 1994, Fox began his legal career at Dilworth Paxson LLP, a prestigious Philadelphia law firm. Later in his career at Dilworth Paxson, Fox became the head of the firm's philanthropic and non-profit practice. He was named to Worth magazine's list of "Top 100 attorneys in the country representing affluent families and individuals". At Dilworth, Fox served as one of billionaire Walter Annenberg's most-trusted attorneys and he continues to serve as an attorney for the Annenberg Foundation.

In 2005, Judge William C. Koch Jr. cited an article written by Fox in the majority opinion in the case of Tennessee Division of the United Daughters of the Confederacy v. Vanderbilt University. Fox has also served as an advisor to the University of Miami School of Law's Heckerling Institute on Estate Planning, a conference for estate planning professionals. He chaired the Chartered Adviser in Philanthropy Program at The American College of Financial Services from 2008 to 2010.

In 2015, Fox was elected as a fellow of the American College of Trust and Estate Counsel, an exclusive professional society of attorneys and law professionals with expertise regarding trust and estates. A year later, in 2016, Fox led a project where H.F. Lenfest donated the Philadelphia Media Network, which owns The Philadelphia Inquirer and Philly.com to The Philadelphia Foundation. Lenfest described Fox as the "architect of the deal." Following the restructuring of the Philadelphia Media Network, Fox began advising other local newspapers to restructure as non-profits and serves as counsel to The Philadelphia Foundation. According to Steven Waldman, the president and co-founder of Report for America, there is "probably no lawyer out there who knows more about the intersection of local news and the nonprofit tax code [than Fox]."

Fox left Dilworth Paxson LLP. to become a shareholder at Buchanan Ingersoll & Rooney in 2016. While at Buchanan, Fox remained a legal force in Philadelphia. In 2017, he spearheaded efforts to expand the Community College of Philadelphia and during the COVID-19 pandemic he established and maintained an employee relief fund for employees at the Union League of Philadelphia. In 2021, he worked with Report for America to help develop a bipartisan component in the Build Back Better Act to provide tax credits for local newspapers. Additionally, he was a consultant for the writing of the Local Journalism Sustainability Act.

In 2022, Fox announced that after six years at Buchanan Ingersoll & Rooney, he would be leaving to start his own solo practice: The Law Offices of Richard L. Fox. In this capacity, Fox is better able to focus on his niche speciality of estate and philanthropic planning while having direct control over fees and hourly rates. In a statement Buchanan Ingersoll & Rooney said that they “anticipate continuing to collaborate with Richard as he moves to this new phase in his career.”

Judge Emin Toro writing for the United States Tax Court cited Fox's treatise Charitable Giving: Taxation, Planning, and Strategies in the 2023 case Gerhardt v. IRS.

=== Writings ===
Fox is the author of Charitable Giving: Taxation, Planning, and Strategies, a legal treatise, published in 2008, on charitable giving and retirement plans.

He is also a co-author of the 2012 book, Preserving a Home for Veterans, which chronicles Fox and others, who took on the Department of Veterans Affairs for leasing parts of property, donated to veterans, to private entities such as oil drillers.

Fox sits on the advisory board and serves as an author for Estate Planning magazine, which is published by Thomson Reuters. He is also a frequent legal commentator for Bloomberg News, The Philadelphia Inquirer and Leimberg Information Services. In addition, he has provided legal commentary to The Wall Street Journal, The Washington Post and CNBC.
