= Marilyn W. Thompson =

American writer (born 1952)

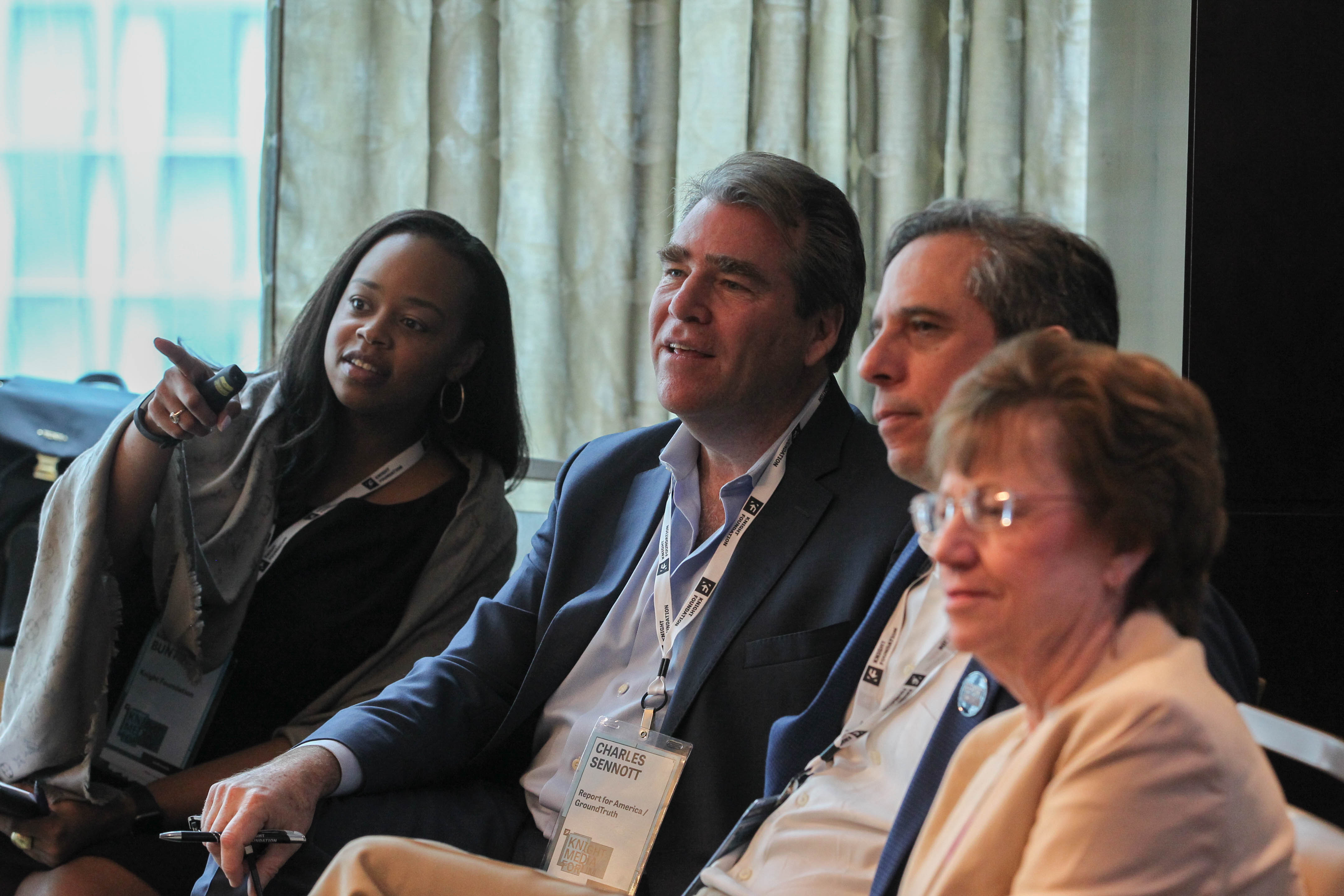
LaSharah Bunting of the Knight Foundation, Charles Sennott, Steven Waldman of Report for America, and Marilyn Thompson of ProPublica during a breakout session at the 2019 Knight Foundation Media Forum

Marilyn Walser Thompson (born 1952) is an American investigative journalist, author, and editor. She is the author of books covering American events such as the Wedtech scandal and the 2001 anthrax attacks, and co-authored two biographies of Senator Strom Thurmond (R-SC). At the Washington Post, Thompson was an editor of reports on gun violence that was a finalist for the Pulitzer Prize in public service in 1992. As an editor on the Investigative Team, she led the group that won the Pulitzer Prize for Public Service in 1999 and 2000.

== Education ==
Thompson graduated from Clemson University (1974) with a Bachelor's in English, and was managing editor of The Tiger, the university's student newspaper.

== Career ==
Following graduation from Clemson University, she joined the Columbia (SC) Record as a governmental affairs and investigative reporter.

From 1982 to 1986 she worked for the Philadelphia Daily News, first as a freelancer then as a staff general assignment and investigative reporter. In 1986, she moved to the New York Daily News as a general assignment reporter and uncovered the Wedtech scandal, the story of a South Bronx minority-owned defense contractor that won special treatment from the Reagan administration. The investigation led to dozens of federal indictments, from low-level government contracting officials to a White House official who owned company stock.

In 1987, Thompson was promoted to Assistant City Editor for Investigations before being transferred to Washington, DC, in 1988, to cover the Justice Department and Attorney General Ed Meese’s entanglement in the Wedtech affair. Thompson moved to The Washington Post in 1990 as a general assignment reporter on the Metro desk assigned to Prince George's County, Maryland government. She was promoted to Metro Projects Editor the next year and helped edit a package on gun violence that was a finalist for the Pulitzer Prize for Public Service. She transferred to the Post’s national desk as Deputy National Editor for investigations, managing a number of Clinton administration scandals. She was promoted to Assistant Managing Editor of the Investigative Team, a group that won the Pulitzer Prize for Public Service in 1999 and 2000.

In 2003 Thompson was a visiting professor of journalism at Princeton University. She left the Post in 2004 to become editor of the Herald-Leader in Lexington, KY, then returned to Washington after the demise of Knight-Ridder newspapers. Between 2006 and 2007, she worked for a year as investigations editor in the Los Angeles Times Washington bureau, then moved to the New York Times as a reporter in the Washington bureau. She was recruited back to the Post in 2007 to serve as an enterprise editor on the National desk, and was promoted to National Editor.

Thompson left the Post in 2011 to work for three years as Washington bureau chief for Reuters. She left Reuters to serve as Deputy Editor of POLITICO and after a year, became a Shorenstein Fellow at Harvard's Kennedy School. Thompson returned to the Post under contract to help manage coverage of the 2016 presidential campaign. After a brief stint at Kaiser Health News as deputy investigations editor, she returned to the Post in 2017 as National weekend and deputy political enterprise editor. Thompson joined ProPublica in 2018 as an editor on the local news network, after which she was asked to set up a ProPublica Washington bureau with six reporters investigating the federal government.

After helping break the Wedtech government corruption story, Thompson wrote Feeding the Beast: How Wedtech Became the Most Corrupt Little Company in America (1990). In the aftermath of the terrorist attacks on the United States in 2001, she wrote The Killer Strain: Anthrax and a Government Exposed (2004). In 2001, Thompson co-wrote, with Jack Bass, an unauthorized biography of Strom Thurmond. In 2003, she broke the story in The Washington Post of Thurmond’s mixed-race daughter Essie Mae Washington-Williams. After this front-page expose, she and Bass updated their Thurmond biography with a new title, Strom: The Complicated Personal and Political Life of Strom Thurmond.

== Works ==
- Feeding the Beast: How Wedtech Became the Most Corrupt Little Company in America. New York: Scribner. 1990. ISBN 978-0684190204. OCLC 20722029.
- (with Jack Bass) Strom: An Unauthorized Biography. Columbia, S.C.: University of South Carolina Press. 2001. ISBN 978-1563525230. OCLC 62573117.
- The killer strain : anthrax and a government exposed. New York: Harper Perennial. 2004. ISBN 0-06-052279-8. OCLC 55151765.
- (with Jack Bass) Strom: The Complicated Personal and Political Life of Strom Thurmond. PublicAffairs, U.S. 2005. ISBN 978-1586482978. OCLC 58729399.

== Awards and honors ==
In 1976 and 1982, Thompson was named South Carolina Journalist of the Year. In 1982, she was named a Congressional Fellow by the American Political Science Association and spent a year studying Congress. Thompson was The Washington Post's editor of reports on gun violence that was a finalist for the Pulitzer Prize in public service in 1992. As the Post's Managing Editor of the Investigative Team, she led the group that won the Pulitzer Prize for Public Service in 1999 and 2000. In 2016, Thompson was named a Shorenstein Fellow at Harvard's Kennedy School.
