= Balboni =

Balboni is an Italian surname. Notable people with the surname include:

- June Mathis Balboni (1887–1927), American screenwriter
- Michael A.L. Balboni, member of the New York State Senate
- Steve Balboni, former Major League Baseball player
- Valentino Balboni, former chief test driver of Lamborghini
- Philip S. Balboni, American journalist and media entrepreneur
