= Charles Sennott =

Journalist and author

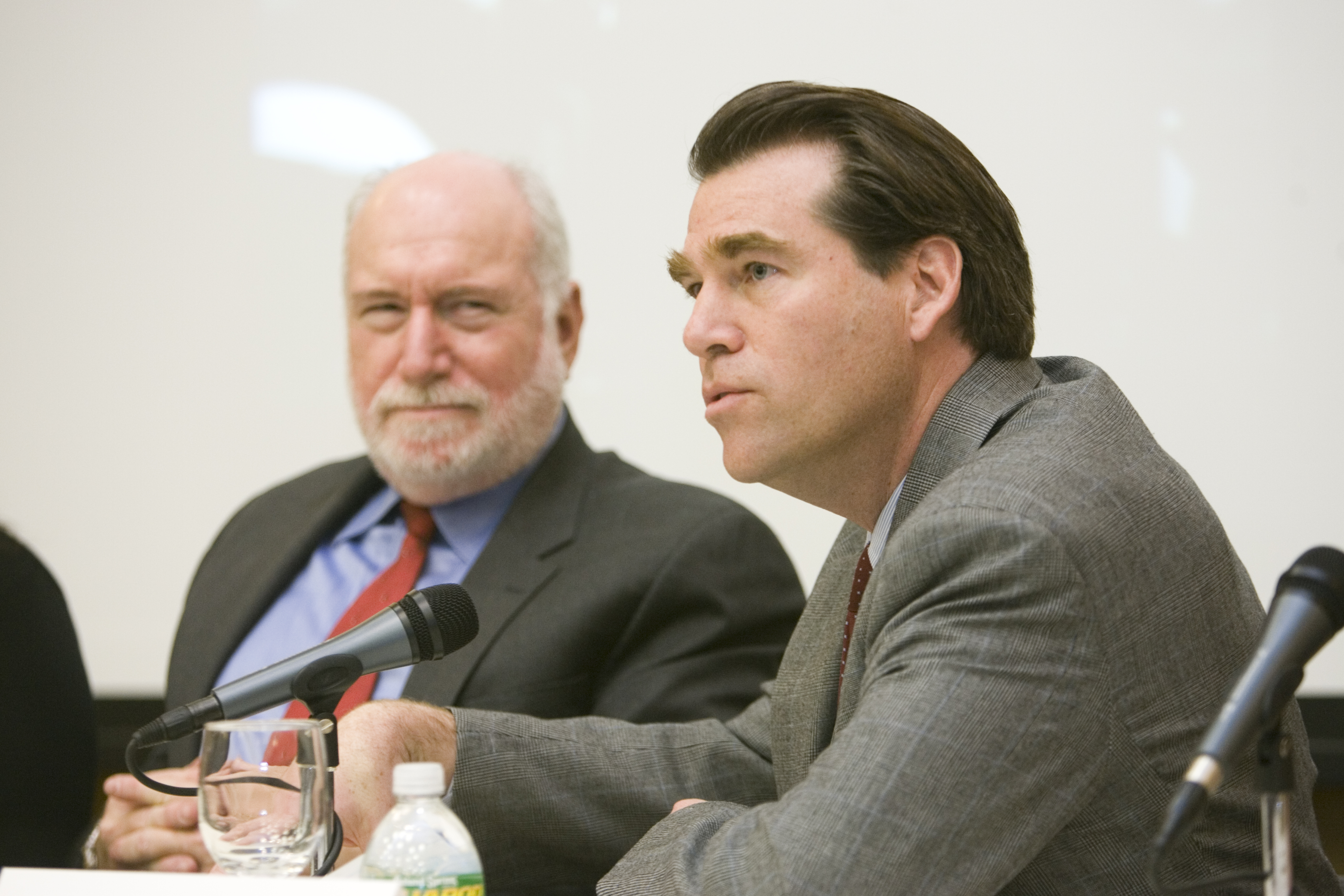
Charles Sennott speaking on right

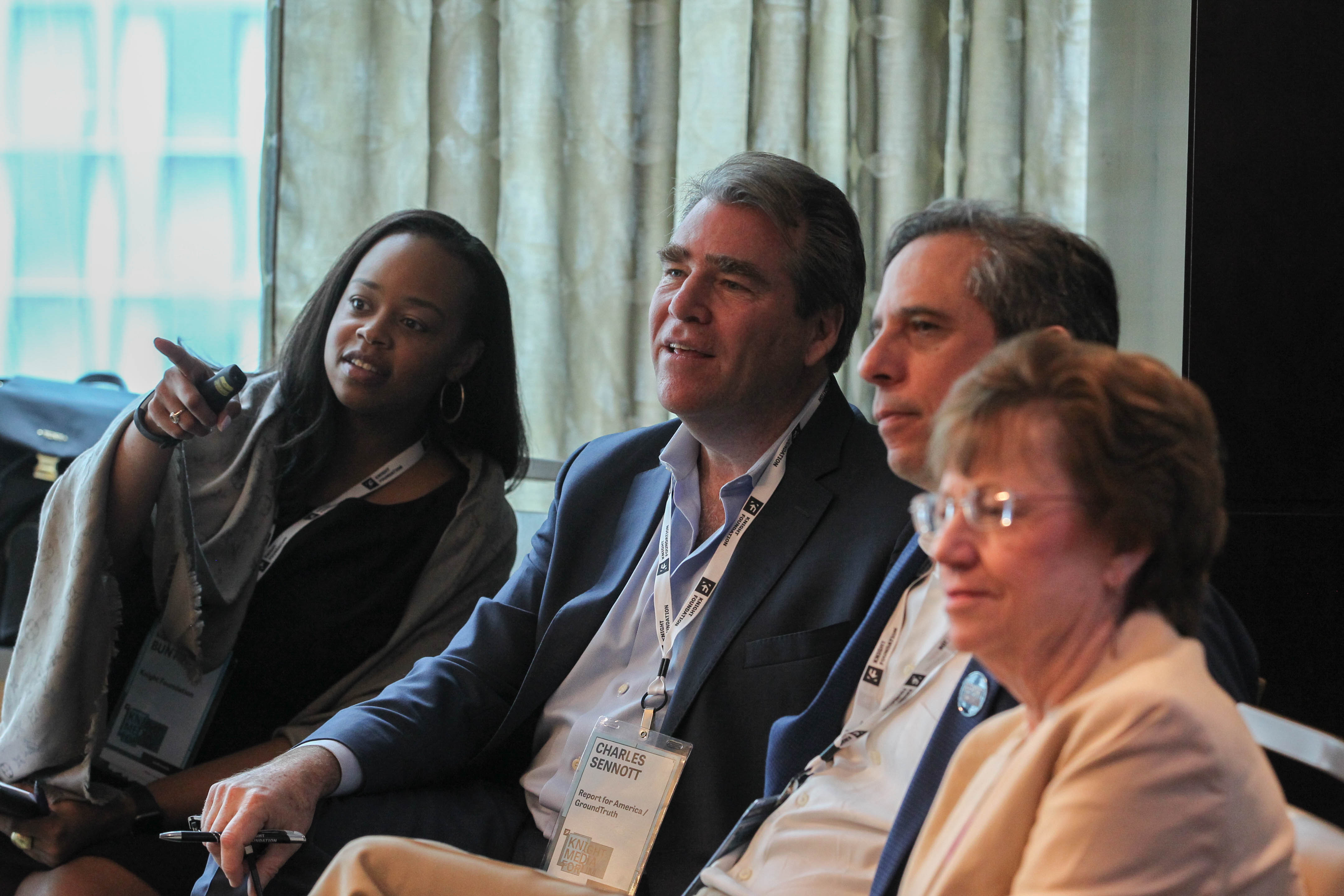
LaSharah Bunting of the Knight Foundation, Charles Sennott, Steven Waldman of Report for America, and Marilyn Thompson of ProPublica during a breakout session at the 2019 Knight Foundation Media Forum

Charles M. Sennott is a journalist and author who helped found The GroundTruth Project and serves as its editor-in-chief. He has held various positions at the Boston Globe including European Bureau Chief. He wrote a book about the disappearance of Christian communities in the Middle East. He co-founded and has helped lead GlobalPost. His book on Bruce Ritter, Broken Covenant, was published in 1992.

He graduated from the University of Massachusetts.

He has appeared on C-SPAN. He was interviewed by Terry Gross on Fresh Air.

In 2024 he received a press freedom award. He has spoken about the Boston Marathon bombing. He produced a program on Christian Zionists.

In 2009 he wrote about his career.

== Writings ==
- Broken Covenant; the Story of Father Bruce Ritter's Fall from Grace (1992)
- The Body and the Blood: The Middle East's Vanishing Christians and the Possibility for Peace
