= Michael Waldman =

American attorney and political advisor

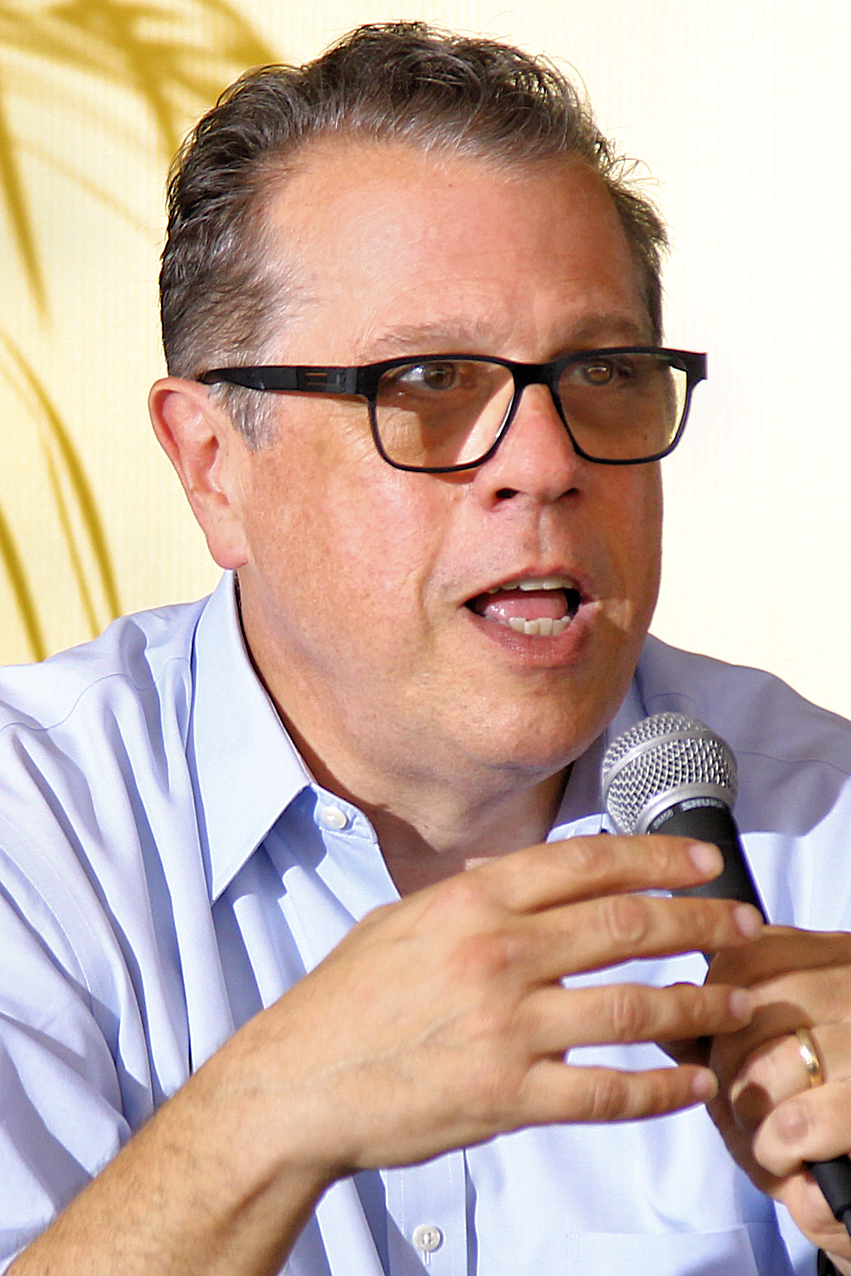
- Waldman in 2023

White House Director of Speechwriting
- In office December 22, 1995 – August 9, 1999
- President: Bill Clinton
- Preceded by: Donald A. Baer
- Succeeded by: Terry Edmonds

Personal details
- Party: Democratic
- Spouse: Elizabeth Fine
- Children: 3
- Relatives: Steven Waldman (brother)
- Education: Columbia University (BA); New York University (JD)

Michael A. Waldman is an American attorney, a presidential speechwriter, and political advisor, currently serving as the president of the Brennan Center for Justice, a nonprofit law and policy institute whose operations are centered at the New York University School of Law. Waldman has led the center since 2005.

== Education ==
Waldman earned a bachelor of arts degree from Columbia University in 1982 and a juris doctor from the New York University School of Law in 1987. During law school, Waldman worked on the New York University Law Review.

== Career ==
From 1993 to 1995, Waldman was a special assistant to President Bill Clinton for policy coordination. As the top White House policy aide on campaign finance reform, he drafted the Clinton administration's public financing proposal. From 1995 to 1999, he was director of speechwriting, serving as assistant to the president, and was responsible for writing or editing nearly 2,000 speeches, including four State of the Union and two Inaugural addresses.

Prior to his government service, Waldman was the executive director of Public Citizen's Congress Watch, then the capital's largest consumer lobbying office (1989–92). After working in the government, he was a lecturer in public policy at Harvard's John F. Kennedy School of Government (2001–03), teaching courses on political reform, public leadership, and communications. He was a partner in a litigation law firm in New York City and Washington, D.C.

In a September 2000 interview with PBS, he discussed his experiences at the White House, including his role as speechwriter, President Clinton's communication style, and the White House response to events such as the Oklahoma City bombing and the Lewinsky scandal.

On April 9, 2021, Waldman was named to the Presidential Commission on the Supreme Court of the United States by President Joe Biden.

=== Media appearances ===
Waldman appears frequently on television and radio to discuss public policy, the presidency, and the law. Appearances include Good Morning America; PBS Newshour, CBS Evening News; the O'Reilly Factor; Nightline; 60 Minutes; Hardball with Chris Matthews; CNN's Crossfire; the Dylan Ratigan Show; live commentary on NBC (State of the Union) and ABC (Obama inaugural); NPR's Morning Edition; All Things Considered; Fresh Air; Diane Rehm; The Colbert Report; and many other programs. He writes frequently for publications including The New York Times, Washington Post, Newsweek, Slate, and Democracy.

=== Writing ===
Waldman is the author of several books, including:

- Who Robbed America? A Citizens' Guide to the S&L Scandal. Random House. 1990. ISBN 0-679-73482-1.
- POTUS Speaks: Finding the Words That Defined the Clinton Presidency. Simon & Schuster. 2000. ISBN 978-0-7432-0020-2.
- My Fellow Americans: The Most Important Speeches of America's Presidents from George Washington to Barack Obama. Sourcebooks. 2010 [2003]. ISBN 978-1-4022-4367-7.
- A Return to Common Sense: Seven Bold Ways to Revitalize Democracy. Sourcebooks. 2008. ISBN 978-1-4022-1365-6.
- The 2nd Amendment: A Biography. Simon & Schuster. 2014. ISBN 978-1-4767-4744-6.
- The Fight to Vote. Simon & Schuster. 2017. ISBN 978-1-9821-9893-0. Revised edition, 2022.
- The Supermajority: How the Supreme Court Divided America. Simon & Schuster. 2023. ISBN 978-1-6680-0606-1.

== Personal life ==
Waldman spent the majority of his childhood in Great Neck, New York. He is married to Elizabeth Fine, counsel to New York Governor Kathy Hochul. She was general counsel to the New York City Council and deputy assistant attorney general for the United States during the Clinton administration. Together they have three children. Waldman and his family reside in Brooklyn, New York.

His brother, Steven Waldman, co-founded Beliefnet and formerly served as a senior advisor to the chairman of the Federal Communications Commission.
