= CalMatters =

California news nonprofit

- Formation: 2015
- Type: Nonprofit (501(c)(3))
- Headquarters: Sacramento, CA
- Region served: California
- CEO: Neil Chase
- Subsidiaries: The Markup
- Affiliations: Institute for Nonprofit News
- Website: Official website

CalMatters, a nonprofit news organization covering California state politics and policies, launched in 2015.

As of 2017, it was becoming one of the largest nonprofit newsrooms in the country, raising 90 percent of its funding from individuals with only some foundation support. It has also credited its partnership with the LA Times and Capitol Public Radio, among others, as helping to grow the organization quickly. Neil Chase has served as Chief Executive Officer since 2019.

In April 2026, CalMatters received a News & Documentary Emmy Award nomination in the Outstanding Editing: News category for "Operation Return to Sender," a documentary produced in collaboration with Bellingcat and Evident Media. The documentary investigated U.S. Border Patrol raids in Kern County and was CalMatters' first venture into film production.

== History ==
Founders cited the decline in coverage of state politics in the decade leading up to the founding of CalMatters as a major motivation.

Upon Donald Trump taking office, the website launched a project called "Trump v. California" which highlighted the criticisms made by the president against the heavily Democratic state.

CalMatters launched a rebranded website in 2019.

In November 2023, Andrew Donohue was named investigative editor and expanded his investigative team from three to five in 2023.

In 2024, nonprofit news outlet The Markup merged newsrooms with CalMatters, citing complementary funders and expertise, with The Markup having a more technical and narrower focus on national and global technology policy.

== Awards ==
- Edward R. Murrow Award (Corporation for Public Broadcasting)
  - 2020 for Large Market Radio Multimedia (to California Dream collaboration of KQED, KPCC, KPBS, CapRadio and CalMatters) for "Graying California"
- EPPY Awards
  - 2022 Winner, Best Online-Only News Website in the Nation
  - 2019 Winners:
    - Best Feature Story
    - Best Innovation Project
- Online Journalism Awards (OJAs)
  - 2018 First Place, Feature
- San Francisco / Northern California Emmy Awards
  - 2025 Winner, Digital Democracy
  - 2024 Winner, Criminal justice
  - 2023 Winner, Trial by Fire

== See also ==
- States Newsroom, with whom CalMatters has a content-sharing agreement
- The Texas Tribune
