= Affinity4 =

American Chritian organization

- Company type: affinity-based marketing, telecommunications
- Available in: English
- Headquarters: Virginia Beach, Virginia, U.S.
- Area served: Non-profit organizations
- Owners: BN Media, LLC
- Key people: Stephen D. Halliday, Jay Sekulow, John Kingston
- Services: Communications, philanthropy and motorist assistance
- Divisions: Affinity4, Beliefnet
- Website: http://www.affinity4.com/

Affinity4 is an American for-profit company that raises funds for nonprofit organizations through an affinity marketing partnership. It is based in Virginia Beach.

== History ==
The predecessor to Affinity4, LifeLine Communications, was founded in 1992 and utilized sales of long distance telephone service to raise funds for nonprofit organizations.

=== Name change ===
In April 2005, LifeLine Communications announced that it was changing its name to Affinity4. The same year, Affinity4 moved its headquarters from Oklahoma City, Oklahoma to Norfolk, Virginia.

== Services ==
Affinity4 launched its long distance telephone service, followed closely by Affinity4 Internet Service, then others like wireless service, roadside assistance programs and a savings program.

In June 2010, Affinity4's parent company, BN Media, purchased Beliefnet from NewsCorp and maintains a separate advisory board from Affinity4.

In September 2016, Patheos.com was added to the family of brands.

== GiveBack program ==
Pursuant to Affinity4's GiveBack Program, it donates up to 10% of the proceeds it receives from customers to their designated nonprofit organizations.

== Partners ==
Affinity4 partners with charities, Christian ministries and other nonprofits.

== Board of directors ==
- Stephen D. Halliday
- Jay Alan Sekulow
- John Kingston
