= Dragnet Nation =

Dragnet Nation: A quest for privacy, security, and freedom in a world of relentless surveillance
- Author: Julia Angwin
- Subject: Computer and network surveillance
- Publisher: Times Books
- Publication date: February 25, 2014
- Publication place: United States
- Pages: 304
- ISBN: 978-0805098075

Dragnet Nation: A quest for privacy, security, and freedom in a world of relentless surveillance is a 2014 book about Computer and network surveillance by Julia Angwin. Angwin stated that she was motivated to write the book after learning about data scraping.

== Reception ==
The book has been reviewed by various commentators and has received generally positive reviews.
