= Columbia Record =

American newspaper

The Columbia Record was an afternoon daily newspaper published in Columbia, South Carolina. It was established in 1897. International Paper & Power Co. purchased The Record in 1929 from R. Charlton Wright, who had been principal owner since 1918. The State had declined a chance to buy the paper in 1928 and subsequently faced stiff competition from its local rival. In 1945 The State finally purchased The Record from International Paper Co. The State for $550,000, to form the State-Record Company. The company was purchased by Knight-Ridder in 1986, and publication of the Columbia Record ceased on April 1, 1988. One of the quirks of the paper was that it printed the weekly entertainment section on green newsprint.

The decision to close The Record was the natural outgrowth of the decline of afternoon papers nationally. By 1987, the paper's circulation was only 27,000 of which only 15,000 were exclusive Record subscribers. The rest also subscribed to The State. The decision to close the paper was announced by publisher Ben Morris on Jan. 20, 1988. All 50 Record employees were transferred to The State.

Among the reporters to work at The Record was Marilyn Walser Thompson, who was on staff from 1974 to 1982. She gained national recognition for reporting on South Carolina's nuclear industry. She later worked for The Washington Post, the Los Angeles Times, The New York Times and Reuters, as Washington bureau chief. At The Post, she helped manage investigative teams that won Pulitzer Prizes in 1999 and 2000. She also broke the story of Strom Thurmond's biracial child.

In the 1987 official style guide and employee instruction manual, the paper was described as a "modest alternative/news editorial voice" to the newspaper of record, The State. The focus was on "the people, public business and private commerce" of Richland and Lexington counties. Company policy was to "spoonfeed" readers relevant information "as defined by editors to help them be informed and productive citizens." Both The State and The Record had strict rules against obscenities, which extended even to "mild expletives" such as damn or hell. Only the three top editors could approve publishing "ass" or the other words. "The editors and publisher of The State and The Columbia Record do not consider it a badge of journalist integrity to keep pace with the movies or other segments of society in the area of bar talk," Executive News Editor Thomas N. McLean wrote.
