= The Markup =

American nonprofit news organization

- Established: 2018 (8 years ago)
- Founders: Julia Angwin, Sue Gardner, Jeff Larson
- Types: online newspaper
- Purpose: The Markup challenges technology to serve the public good.
- Headquarters: New York City
- Owners: CalMatters
- Chief Executives: Nabiha Syed
- Revenue: 6,862,028 United States dollar (2021)
- Total Assets: 7,207,134 United States dollar (2021)
- Website: themarkup.org

The Markup is an American nonprofit news publication focused on the impact of technology on society. Founded in 2018 with the goal of advancing data-driven journalism, the publication launched in February 2020. Nabiha Syed is the current chief executive officer and Sisi Wei is the editor-in-chief.

== History ==
The Markup was co-founded by two former ProPublica journalists, Julia Angwin and Jeff Larson, and executive and journalist Sue Gardner. The project was announced in April 2018, with an expected launch in early 2019.

In 2018, founder Angwin said the portal planned to collect and create public datasets through public records requests, automated data collection, crowdsourcing information, and creating tools.

In April 2019, Gardner fired Angwin as editor-in-chief. According to Larson and Gardner, the reasons for Angwin's removal included disagreements over the non-journalistic responsibilities of Angwin's role as an executive, such as the organization falling behind in its hiring plans and the launch timeline. Larson was named as her replacement. In a letter to Craig Newmark, The Markup's largest donor, Angwin asked him to intervene, claiming she was pushed out after resisting Gardner's attempts to change The Markup's mission to "one based on advocacy against the tech companies." Six out of seven journalists on staff resigned following Angwin's ouster. Gardner denied changing the mission, telling The New York Times, "We are, pure and simple, a news outlet, we always have been and always will be. Our goals and purpose haven't changed."

In May 2019, Newmark announced that Gardner and Larson had left The Markup, and there were reports about plans to bring back Angwin as editor-in-chief.

On August 6, 2019, The Markup announced that Angwin would return as editor-in-chief, along with Nabiha Syed as president and much of the original team – but without Larson or Gardner. Syed was previously BuzzFeed's associate general counsel and vice president.

The publication launched in February 2020.

In 2022, Syed hired Sisi Wei, formerly of OpenNews and ProPublica to become editor-in-chief, replacing Angwin.

In February 2023, Angwin left The Markup.

In April 2024, The Markup was acquired by nonprofit media outlet CalMatters. Wei became the company's chief impact officer and Syed became a strategic advisor and will take on a new external role in July. At the time of the sale The Markup had 28 employees and $5 million in philanthropic funding.

== Funding ==
The Markup received a $20 million gift from Craigslist founder Craig Newmark. The Markup also raised $2 million from the Knight Foundation and an additional $1 million from the Ford Foundation, MacArthur Foundation, and The Ethics and Governance of Artificial Intelligence Initiative.

== 2022 reporting on Meta and tax preparation companies ==
In November 2022, an investigation by The Markup revealed that tax filing companies including H&R Block, TaxSlayer, and TaxAct have shared users' financial information with Facebook parent company Meta. In response, a class action lawsuit was filed by H&R Block customers against Meta, who accused the tech company of violating users' privacy rights. Senator Elizabeth Warren and representatives Katie Porter and Brad Sherman sent letters to the tax companies, as well as Meta and Google, to warn against such behavior.

== See also ==
- Institute for Nonprofit News (member)
