= GlobalPost =

American digital journalism company

GlobalPost Media Corporation
- Trade name: GlobalPost
- Industry: News media
- Genre: Digital journalism
- Founded: January 12, 2009 in Boston, Massachusetts
- Founders: Philip S. Balboni; Charles M. Sennott
- Headquarters: The Pilot House, Boston, Massachusetts, U.S.
- Area served: Worldwide
- Key people: Philip S. Balboni (CEO); Hampton Stephens (chairman)
- Website: www.globalpost.com

GlobalPost Media Corporation is an American digital journalism company and former news website that focuses on international news. Founded on January 12, 2009 by Philip S. Balboni and Charles Sennott, its stated mission is "to redefine international news for the digital age." GlobalPost now has 64 correspondents worldwide following the kidnapping and beheading of James Foley, an event which has raised questions about GlobalPost's role in sending unsupported personnel into conflict zones.

In 2015, GlobalPost was acquired by WGBH. The company was reacquired by Balboni in the fall of 2022 and reorganized into GlobalPost Media Corporation.

== History ==
In 2009 GlobalPost announced syndication agreements with PBS and CBS. As part of the PBS partnership, GlobalPost correspondents began producing video segments for airing on The PBS NewsHour. Additional arrangements with media outlets including the New York Daily News, The World Weekly, Times of India, and Newark Star-Ledger offered news organizations unlimited rights to republish GlobalPost content in exchange for a flat service fee. According to GlobalPost ownership, income from their syndication agreements accounted for more than 12-percent of the site's revenue.

Interest in the site's direct-to-reader paid access options, however, has been lackluster. Within a year of launch GlobalPost had discounted their premium "Passport Service"—which offered access to unique content, but had fewer than 400 subscribers—from $199 to $99 per year. A second price cut the same year discounted the subscription rate to less than $30.

== Awards ==
In 2011, GlobalPost's "On Location" video series was recognized with a Peabody Award and an Edward R. Murrow Award. At the same time in 2011, it was honored with ten Best in Business Journalism Awards from the Society of American Business Editors and Writers (SABEW).

In 2014, the site was honored with a Robert F. Kennedy Journalism Award for its multimedia series "Myanmar Emerges." This series also earned the Edwin M. Hood Award for Diplomatic Correspondence from the National Press Club.
