= Valentino Balboni =

Former chief test driver of Lamborghini

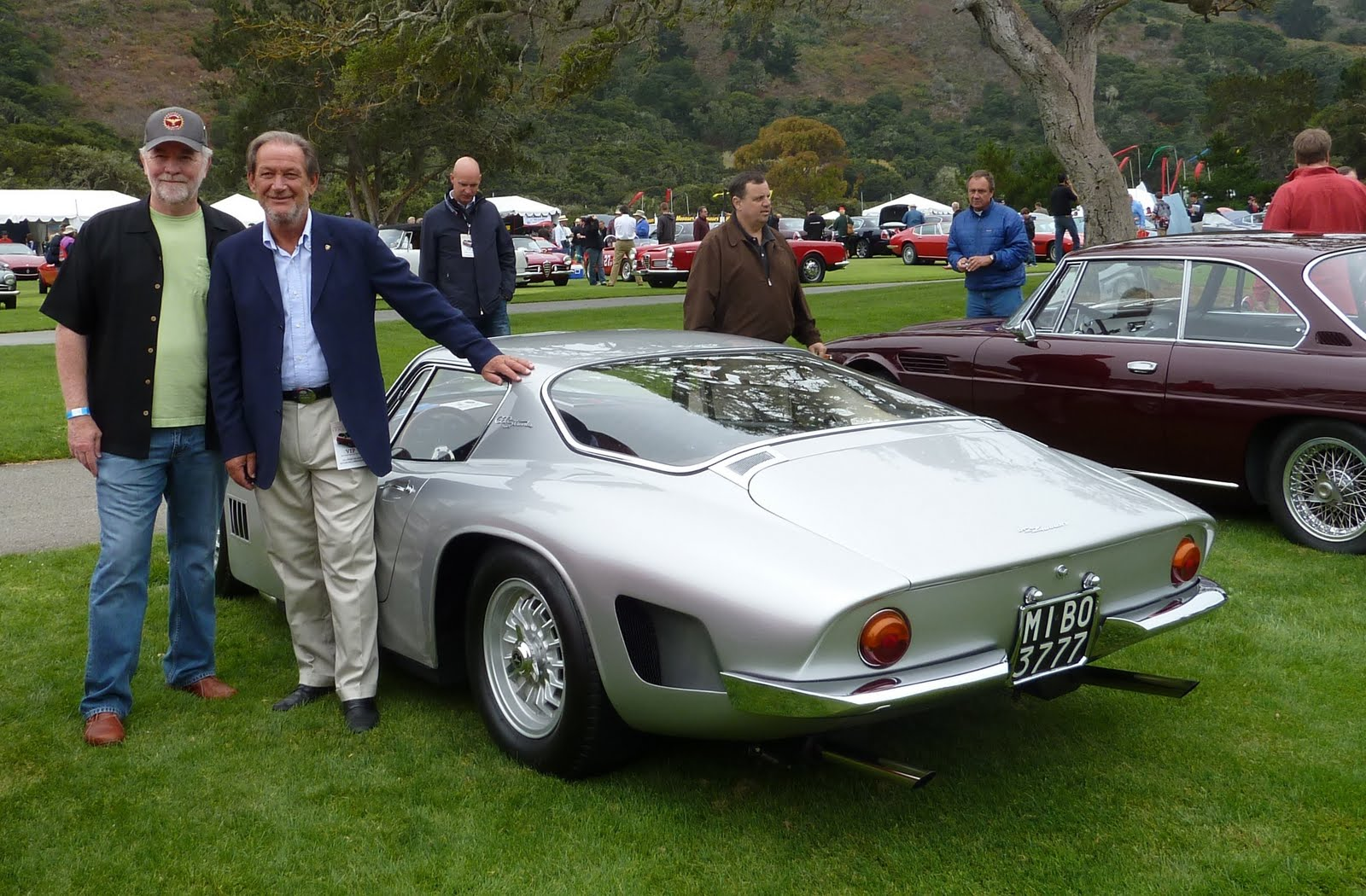
- Valentino Balboni (middle), Mike Gulett and his silver Bizzarrini GT 5300 Strada in Monterey at Concorso Italiano in 2011.
- Born: Valentino Balboni; 13 May 1949 (age 77); Casumaro, Italy
- Occupation: Chief test driver of Lamborghini
- Years active: 1968–2008

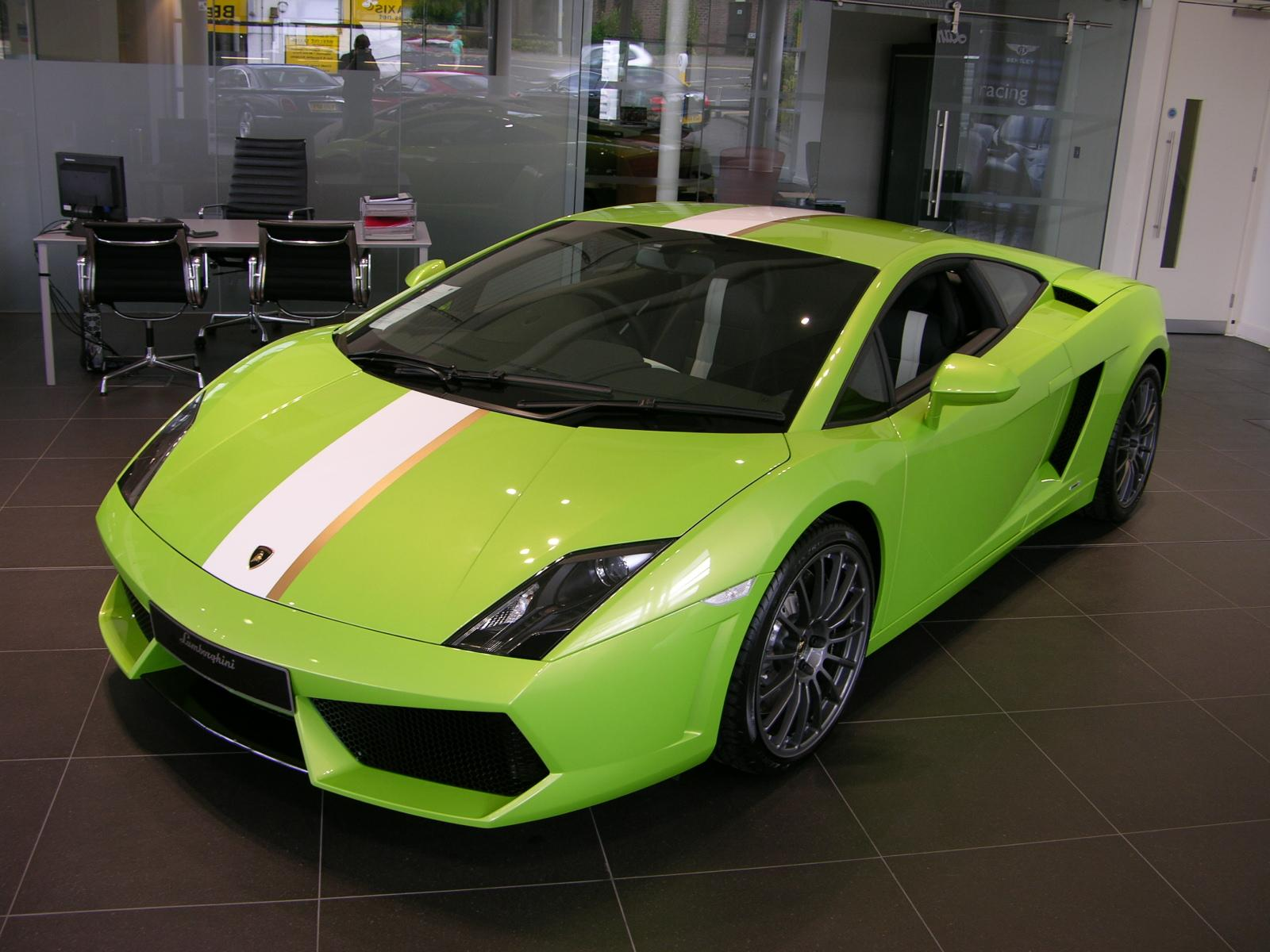
The Lamborghini Gallardo LP 550–2 Valentino Balboni

Valentino Balboni (born 13 May 1949) is the former chief test driver of Lamborghini, a manufacturer of sports cars in Italy. He retired in October 2008 due to Italian government work regulations, after having served the company for 40 years. To pay tribute to him in occasion of his retirement, Lamborghini had labeled a 2009 edition to the Gallardo line-up, the LP550-2 Valentino Balboni.

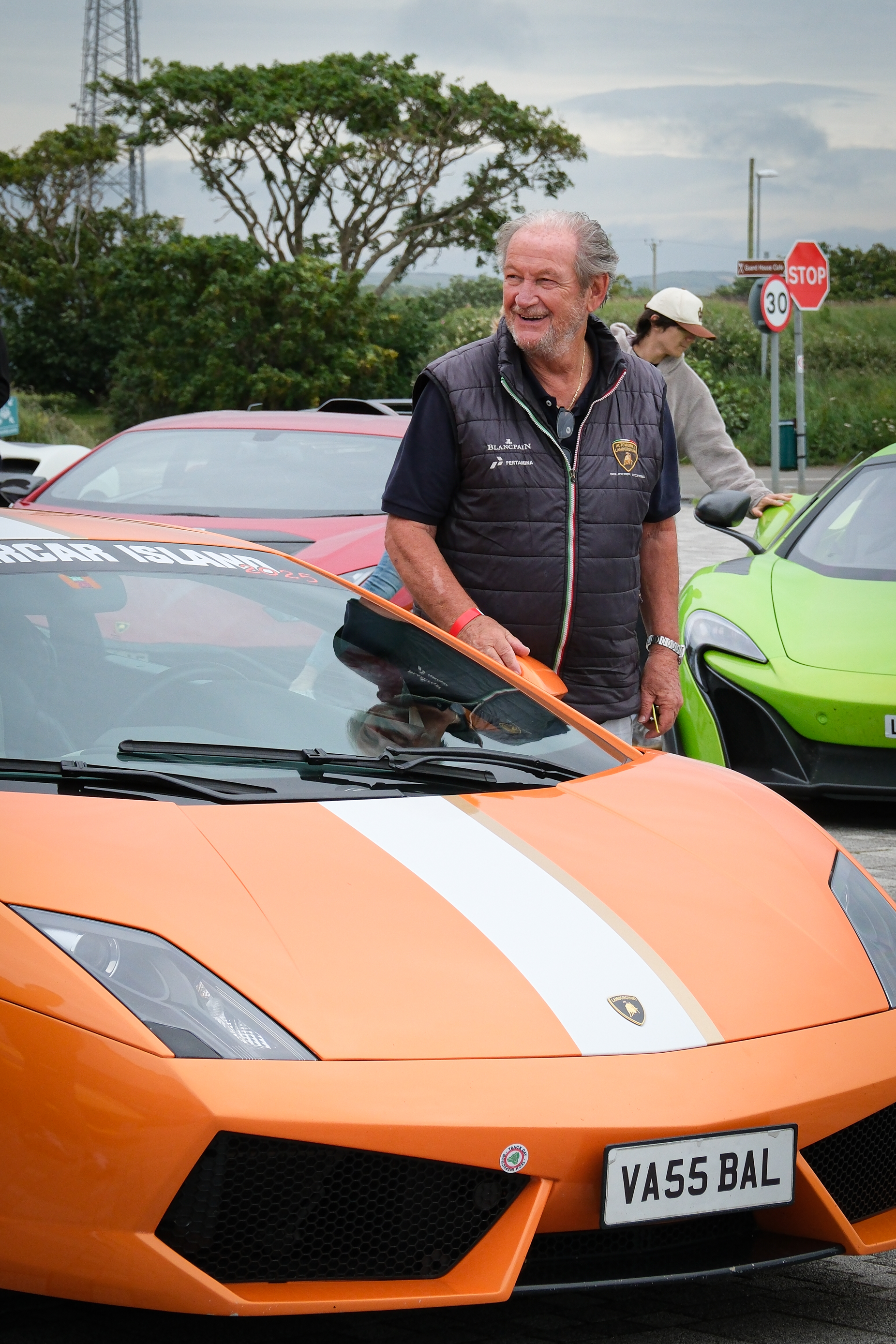
Valentino Balboni outside the Isle of Man Motor Museum, June 2025

== Biography ==
Balboni started working for Lamborghini on 21 April 1968, as a mechanic apprentice in the company. Eventually, he was personally asked by the company's founder, Ferruccio Lamborghini, to test-drive the newly built cars alongside Bob Wallace. Valentino Balboni has reportedly driven about 80% of all Lamborghinis ever built. Among the marque aficionados, Balboni has risen to cult status. In 2008, Balboni was still active for the company as the chief test-driver and ambassador. Fluent in English and German, he often appeared at different Lamborghini-related events, such as new models' unveiling.

In July 2009, Lamborghini announced a special edition run of 250 Gallardo LP550-2 "Valentino Balboni edition" supercars; the company stated that the new car was rear-wheel driven in accordance with Balboni's preference for the thrill of cornering a rear-wheel driven vehicle. These vehicles were also made special with a white and gold stripe that runs the center of the car, inspired by sports cars of the 1970s.

Balboni, even though officially retired as chief test driver, has signed a two-year contract with Lamborghini as a consultant through 2010 that can be renewed multiple times.

Valentino Balboni said that the first car that got him excited about cars was a silver Bizzarrini GT 5300 that he saw at the Turin Auto Show in 1966.

In June 2026, the Isle of Man Post Office issued a limited-edition Valentino Balboni Signature Collection as part of its Supercar Island stamp issue. Limited to 150 numbered sets, the collection comprised a hand-signed first day cover by Balboni, a certificate of authenticity and a sheet of stamps depicting the Gallardo LP550-2 Valentino Balboni Edition.

== Media ==
Valentino Balboni has made several appearances on television in different documentaries related to Lamborghini such as Top Gear, Jeremy Clarkson's Motorworld, Rides, as well as an episode of 60 Minutes from 1987. In the 2012 film Zero Dark Thirty, one of the characters asks a salesman at a Lamborghini dealer "...is that a Balboni?", referring to the special edition vehicle.
