= Nabiha Syed =

American technology lawyer and executive

Nabiha Syed is an American technology lawyer and executive. Syed was the chief executive officer of The Markup, a data-driven media startup. She has been described as "one of the best emerging free speech lawyers" by Forbes magazine. In 2023, Syed was recognized as a transformational leader in digital civil rights by the NAACP. On May 15, 2024, Syed became the executive director of the Mozilla Foundation.

== Biography ==
Syed was born to parents who immigrated from Pakistan. A Marshall Scholar, Syed co-founded the Media Freedom and Information Access legal clinic at Yale Law School, of which she is a graduate and a visiting fellow.

She led libel, privacy, and newsgathering matters at BuzzFeed, a global media company. Prior to BuzzFeed, Syed was the First Amendment Fellow at The New York Times. Syed also serves as adjunct faculty at Columbia University Graduate School of Journalism, and on the boards of the New York Civil Liberties Union, the New Press, the Scott Trust (owner of The Guardian newspaper), and the Reporters Committee for the Freedom of the Press. She and her work have been featured in the Yale Law Journal and Vanity Fair.

Under her leadership, The Markup published an investigation that revealed a third of the top 100 hospitals in the United States were sharing patients' personal data with Facebook, which led to both the social media company and several hospitals involved being sued under the Health Insurance Portability and Accountability Act.

== Recognition ==
In 2016, she was named as a "40 Under 40 Rising Star" by the New York Law Journal.

In 2017, she was a finalist for the International Bar Association Outstanding Young Lawyer of the Year Award.

In 2018, Syed received the inaugural Rising Star Award from the Reporter's Committee for Freedom of the Press. Also that year, Nabiha delivered the Salant Lecture on Freedom of the Press at the Harvard Kennedy School.

In 2020, Syed delivered the commencement address at Northeastern.

In 2022, The Markup, under Syed's leadership, was recognized as a Most Innovative Company by FastCompany.

In 2023, she was awarded the NAACP's Digital Civil Rights Award.
