= Philip S. Balboni =

American journalist

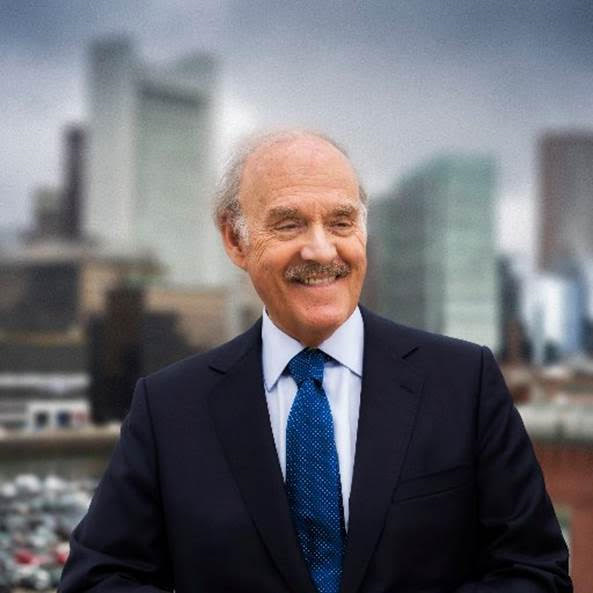
- Born: Philip Scribner Balboni; February 15, 1943 (age 83); Norwood, Massachusetts
- Education: Boston College Sorbonne University Columbia University
- Occupations: Media entrepreneur, broadcaster, journalist
- Years active: 1967-Present
- Known for: GlobalPost
- Spouse: Elizabeth Cannon Houghteling (m. 1988)
- Children: Philip Cannon Houghteling Balboni; Jessica Scribner Brett Balboni

Philip Scribner Balboni (born February 15, 1943) is an American journalist and media entrepreneur who has worked in broadcast and cable television, newspapers, wire services and digital media. He is the founder and former president of New England Cable News and GlobalPost, as well as former vice president and news director of WCVB-TV.

Balboni served as a member of the Board of Visitors of the Columbia Journalism School and is currently a member of the Advisory Board of the Shorenstein Center on Media, Politics and Public Policy at Harvard Kennedy School.

== Early life and education ==
Balboni was born and raised in Norwood, Massachusetts. He received his Bachelor of Arts degree magna cum laude from Boston College in English literature, with minors in philosophy and French literature.

Balboni served two years on active duty as a United States Army officer. In 1965, he served in Vietnam.

He went on to become a Ford Foundation Fellow at Columbia University's Graduate School of Journalism.

== Career ==
Balboni began his journalism career in 1967 as a general assignment reporter for The Richmond Times-Dispatch in Virginia.

=== WCVB-TV ===
At WCVB-TV, the ABC affiliate television station in Boston, Balboni held a series of management positions from 1972 to 1990. He served as editorial director from 1972 to 1982, overseeing the research and writing of all station editorials under the general supervision of its Editorial Board led by Harvard historian Oscar Handlin. In 1982, he became vice president and news director. In early 1982, he conceived and launched the nightly news magazine “Chronicle”

=== Hearst Corporation ===
From 1990 to 1994, Balboni served as special assistant to Frank Bennack, the CEO of the Hearst Corporation, with responsibility for technology strategy and new projects. During this period, Balboni was a founding member of the News in the Future Consortium at the MIT Media Lab.

=== New England Cable News ===
Balboni first conceived of a 24-hour cable news service for New England while serving as news director at WCVB-TV. Upon moving to the Hearst Corporation in New York, he created a joint venture between Hearst and Continental Cablevision, then the third-largest cable television provider in the US. From 1992 until 1994, Balboni served as chairman of the NECN board, becoming its president in April of that year.

=== GlobalPost ===
Balboni left NECN in 2008 to become co-founder, president and CEO of GlobalPost, one of the first native digital news sites started in the United States.

With GlobalPost, Balboni and his co-founder Charles M. Sennott, a former Boston Globe foreign correspondent, created the country's first purely digital international news organization. GlobalPost won the George Foster Peabody Award and Edward R. Murrow Awards for international video reporting.

In late 2015, GlobalPost was sold to the WGBH Educational Foundation.

=== DailyChatter ===
In March 2016, Balboni launched DailyChatter, a subscription-based email newsletter devoted exclusively to world news. According to Balboni, the publication is founded on the principles of independence and non-partisanship with a mission to inform Americans at a time when global news reporting continues to decline.

=== Other professional activities ===
Balboni served as a member of the national jury of the duPont-Columbia Awards in Broadcast Journalism and was a member of the Editorial Advisory Board of the Columbia Journalism Review.
