= Beliefnet =

Christian lifestyle website

- Website type: Lifestyle, spirituality
- Available in: English
- Owner: BN Media Associates
- Launched: December 28, 1999; 26 years ago
- Current status: Active

Beliefnet is a Christian lifestyle website featuring editorial content related to the topics of inspiration, spirituality, health, wellness, love and family, news, and entertainment.

== History ==
Launched in 1999 by Steven Waldman and Robert Nylen, Beliefnet filled a gap in the religious and inspirational content available online. In 2007, Beliefnet was acquired by the Fox Entertainment Group, with a strategy of being integrated into other Fox-owned faith-based entities. This strategy was short-lived and ultimately evolved, again with the sale of Beliefnet in 2010, to BN Media, LLC, an entity that includes the investors behind Affinity4 and Cross Bridge.

In September 2016, Patheos.com was added to the family of brands. In 2021, BN Media LLC announced that the company would be doing business as Radiant. Under Radiant, Beliefnet was rebranded from interfaith/independent to an explicitly Christian website.

== Site architecture ==
Beliefnet provides users with Christian inspirational material and lifestyle coaching. They feature stories, quizzes, recipes, and other resources related to spirituality, inspiration, health and wellness, love and family, and news and entertainment. Beliefnet has also introduced concentrated mini-sections to answer the demand for more genre-specific content, like its Apron Strings section with resources for moms, as well as its Women's Health section. It provides basic information on some additional, non-Christian faiths including Judaism, Buddhism, Hinduism, and Islam, among others.
