= Military Veterans Advocacy =

Non profit organization

Military Veterans Advocacy is a Louisiana-based nonprofit organization that provides legal advocacy on behalf of the military and veterans. The organization is focused on veterans’ health issues, such as toxic chemical exposure and Veterans Affairs benefit processing.

It was founded in 2012 in Slidell, Louisiana and has been tax-exempt since July 2013.

Military Veterans Advocacy has pursued legal action to expand disability benefits for veterans of the Vietnam War, many of whom were exposed to Agent Orange while serving offshore of Vietnam. Advocating for the "Blue Water Navy Association," the organization brought the case Procopio v. Wilkie, which extended the presumption of herbicide exposure to those who served in the territorial sea of South Vietnam. It has similarly advocated for the “Agent Orange Survivors of Guam.”

In 2020, Military Veterans Advocacy filed a lawsuit against then-Secretary of Veterans Affairs Robert Wilkie, seeking a review of his decision not to issue rules related to veterans' claims for herbicide exposure in Guam.

== Leadership ==
Rob Maness serves as executive director of Military Veterans Advocacy. He is a former U.S. Senate candidate and retired Air Force colonel.

The organization's founder, chairman of the board of directors, and director of litigation is John Wells, a retired U.S. Navy commander.
