= Report for America =

American national service program for emerging journalists

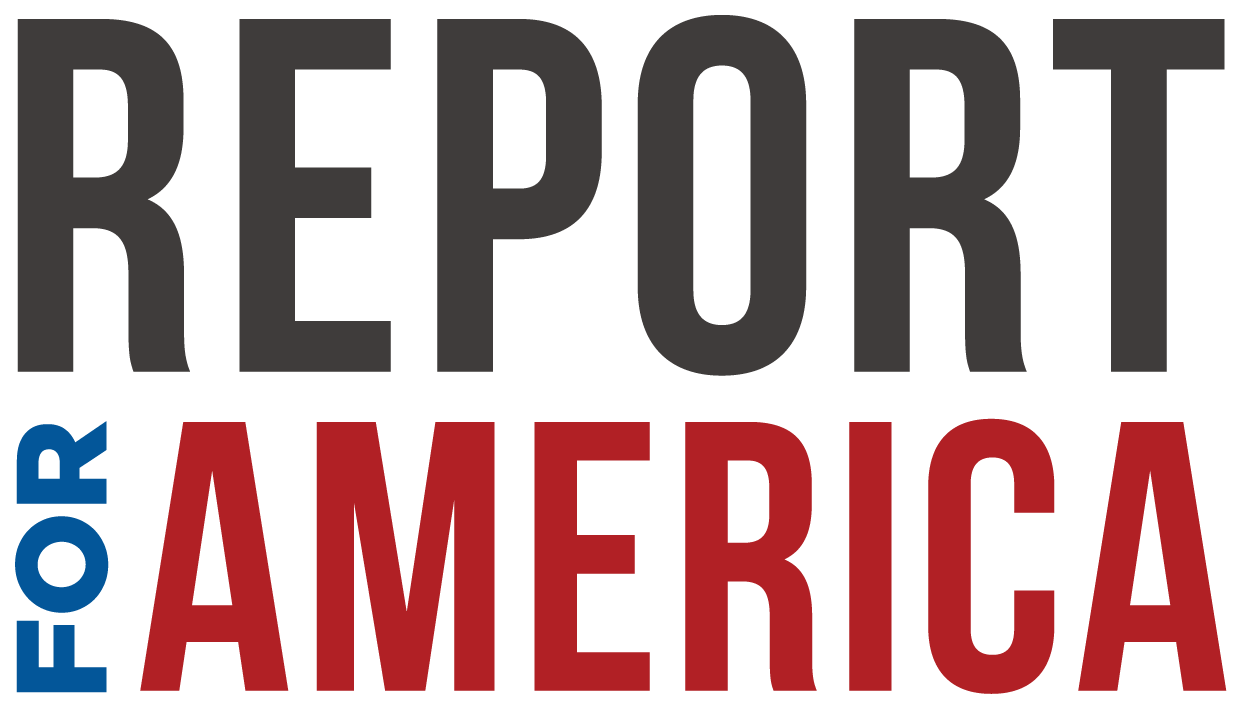

Report for America (RFA) is a service program for emerging journalists in the United States. Participants are placed in local newsrooms across the country. It was launched in 2017 as an initiative of The GroundTruth Project, a 501(c)(3) nonprofit journalism organization that trains and supports emerging journalists across the world. RFA was co-founded by Steven Waldman, who currently serves as its president, and Charles Sennott, the chief executive officer and editor-in-chief of The GroundTruth Project. The program is rooted in a 2015 report written by Waldman, "Report for America: a community service-based model for saving local journalism."

Sennott described Report for America as a “call to service for a new generation of journalists” to help communities by “doing reporting that otherwise isn’t getting done” in a 2019 interview with CNN's Brian Stelter.

According to its founders, the need for the program was the decline in local news outlets. In 1990, daily and weekly newspaper publishers employed about 455,000 people, according to the Bureau of Labor Statistics. By January 2016, that number had fallen to 173,000. Early financial support for Report for America came from the Google News Lab, the Knight Foundation, the Lenfest Institute for Journalism, Galloway Family Foundation, Solutions Journalism Network and the Center for Investigative Reporting. Additional Report for America donors include the Facebook Journalism Project, Craig Newmark Philanthropies, Robert Wood Johnson Foundation, Corporation for Public Broadcasting, Joyce Foundation, Tow Foundation, Chan Zuckerberg Initiative, Microsoft, and Lumina Foundation.

Report for America currently fields some 300 journalists in more than 200 local newsrooms across 49 states, Puerto Rico and Guam. These reporters are called corps members and are selected through a competitive application process each year. Report for America typically places journalists early in their careers, but in 2021 it added slots for some more experienced reporters and editors. Organizations hoping to receive reporters also go through a competitive screening process.

Beyond their selection, Report for America pays up to half of the corps members' salaries. The other half is paid by the local news organization. Report for America encourages its newsroom partners to raise support from the community, introducing philanthropy as a critical revenue stream to make their coverage possible. In 2022, Report for America released its Community News Funds report, which outlined strategies for community foundations and local news leaders to create a single, permanent fund that draws upon donations from multiple sources.

In 2020, Sennott and Waldman accepted the National Press Foundation's Chairman's Citation on behalf of Report for America at its annual journalism awards dinner.

“At a time when good journalism is under siege, Report for America is providing a much-needed boost to bring quality journalism to areas where local reporting has collapsed,” said Kathy Gest, then-chairman of the National Press Foundation. “This program strengthens democracy by providing the kind of factual, in-depth information that people need to make informed decisions.”

Report for America was named as one of six 2021 finalists competing for $100 million in the MacArthur Foundation's 100&Change competition for its efforts to eliminate America's local news deserts. The program's proposal to eliminate news deserts was among 3,650 initial applicants and 475 accepted for review.

== See also ==
- Institute for Nonprofit News (member)
