= Steven Waldman =

American journalist

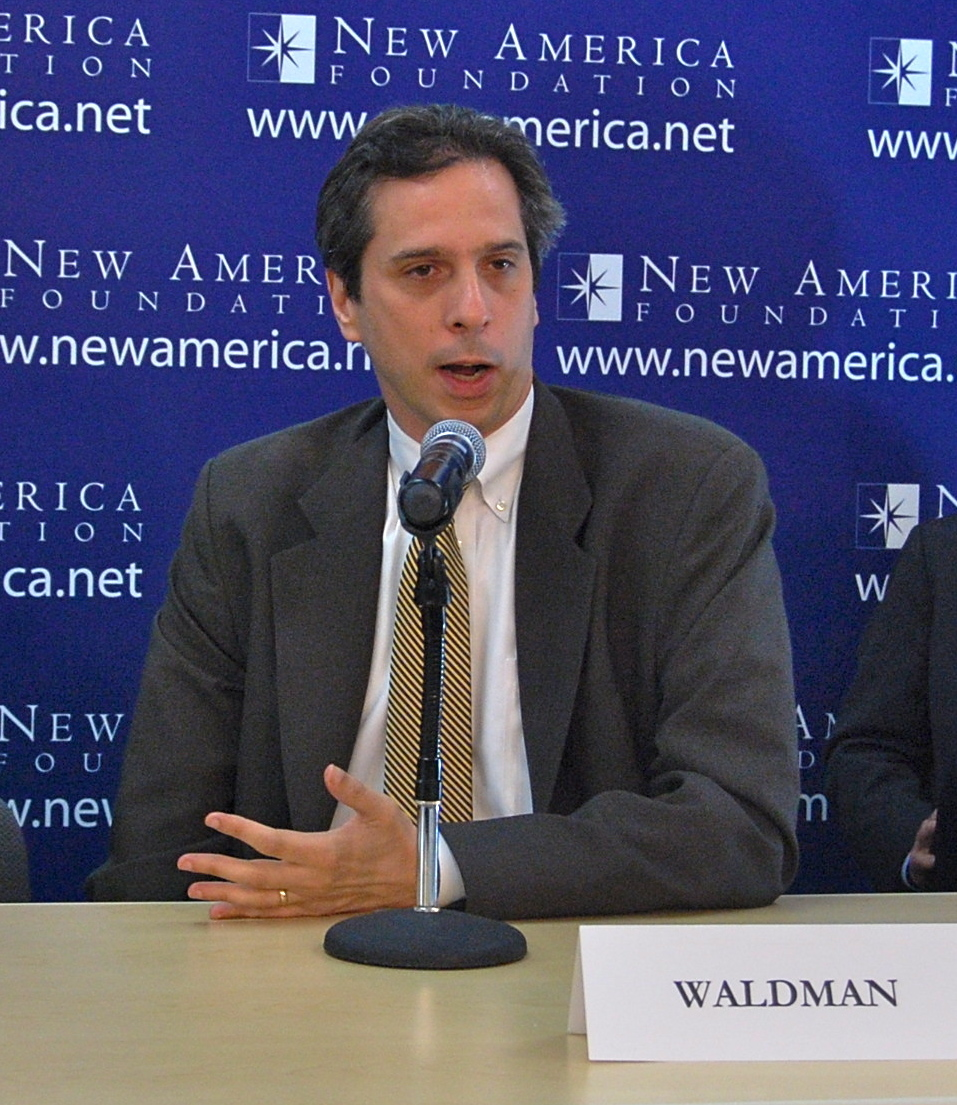
Steven Waldman in 2012

Steven Waldman is an American journalist. He is president and co-founder of Report for America—a national service program that deploys emerging journalists to local newsrooms. He is also the founder and president of Rebuild Local News, a nonpartisan nonprofit advocacy group dedicated to addressing the decline of local news and enhancing local democracy.

Previously he was Senior Advisor to the Chairman of the Federal Communications Commission, serving out of the Office of Strategic Planning. He authored the report "Information Needs of Communities". Waldman had earlier served as editor-in-chief, president, and co-founder of Beliefnet, a multi-faith spirituality website.

== Biography ==
In 1984 Waldman graduated from Columbia University, where he served as editor-in-chief of the Columbia Daily Spectator.

After college, Waldman worked as a political journalist. In 1986–87, he served as editor of The Washington Monthly. He was the national editor of U.S. News & World Report, and worked for eight years in Newsweek's Washington bureau as a national correspondent writing cover-stories on social issues.

Waldman co-founded Beliefnet in 1999. He served as its CEO from 2002 to 2007, leading it out of bankruptcy to a sale to News Corp.; he continued as editor-in-chief until November 2009.

In late 2009, he became a senior advisor to the chairman of the Federal Communications Commission (FCC), serving out of the Office of Strategic Planning. He was assigned to "lead an open, fact-finding process to craft recommendations to meet the traditional goals of serving the public interest and making sure that all Americans receive the information, educational content, and news they seek". The position arose in response to the report of the Knight Commission on the Information Needs of Communities in a Democracy and to other studies that called on the FCC for "new thinking" to "ensure the information opportunities of America's people and the information vitality of our democracy".

In 2015, he wrote a report called "Report for America", proposing a national program to improve local journalism. In 2017, he teamed with The GroundTruth Project, an existing nonprofit news organization, and its CEO, Charles Sennott, to launch the program. The first class of "Report for America" corps members entered newsrooms in 2018. Initial funding came from the Google News Initiative, the Knight Foundation, Craig Newmark and others.

In 2016, he founded LifePosts, a platform for online memorials and other life-milestones. The platform is used by local media and funeral homes.

Waldman is the founder and president of Rebuild Local News, a nonpartisan nonprofit advocacy group committed to addressing the decline of local news and enhancing local democracy.

Waldman is a speaker on topics relating to the spiritual marketplace, to the changing roles of religion in America, and to the convergence of spirituality and marketing. In 2000 Time Magazine named him as an "innovator" in its "100: The Next Wave" feature. He has been a speaker at The World Economic Forum in Davos, Switzerland, "The Resurgence of Religion in Politics" series at The Carnegie Council, The Renaissance Weekend, and numerous religious, policy and media conferences.

== Books ==
External videos
- Booknotes interview with Waldman on The Bill, January 29, 1995, C-SPAN

Waldman is the author of the New York Times bestselling book Founding Faith: How Our Founding Fathers Forged a Radical New Approach to Religious Liberty and is a columnist covering spirituality and politics for The Wall Street Journal Online.

Waldman is also the author of "Sacred Liberty: America's Long, Bloody, and Ongoing Struggle for Religious Freedom" published in 2019 by HarperOne.

Founding Faith: Providence, Politics, and the Birth of Religious Freedom in America was published in hardback in March 2008 and in paperback in March 2009 with the revised title Founding Faith: How Our Founding Fathers Forged a Radical New Approach to Religious Liberty. He is the author of an earlier book The Bill: How the Adventures of Clinton's National Service Bill Reveal What is Corrupt, Comic, Cynical -- and Noble -- About Washington, about the passage of the AmeriCorps law, which is often used as a textbook for college courses. Mr. Waldman served as senior advisor to the CEO of the Corporation for National Service, a $750 million government agency that runs AmeriCorps and other volunteer programs.

== Appearances ==
Waldman has been a guest on CNN, MSNBC, Fox News, ABC News, and NPR, and has written for Slate, National Review, The Washington Post, The New York Times, the Atlantic and other publications.

== Personal life ==
Waldman's brother, Michael Waldman, served as the White House Director of Speechwriting from 1995 to 1999 under President Bill Clinton and is currently the president of the Brennan Center for Justice at New York University School of Law as well as a member of the Presidential Commission on the Supreme Court of the United States.
