= Craig Newmark =

American entrepreneur, Craigslist founder

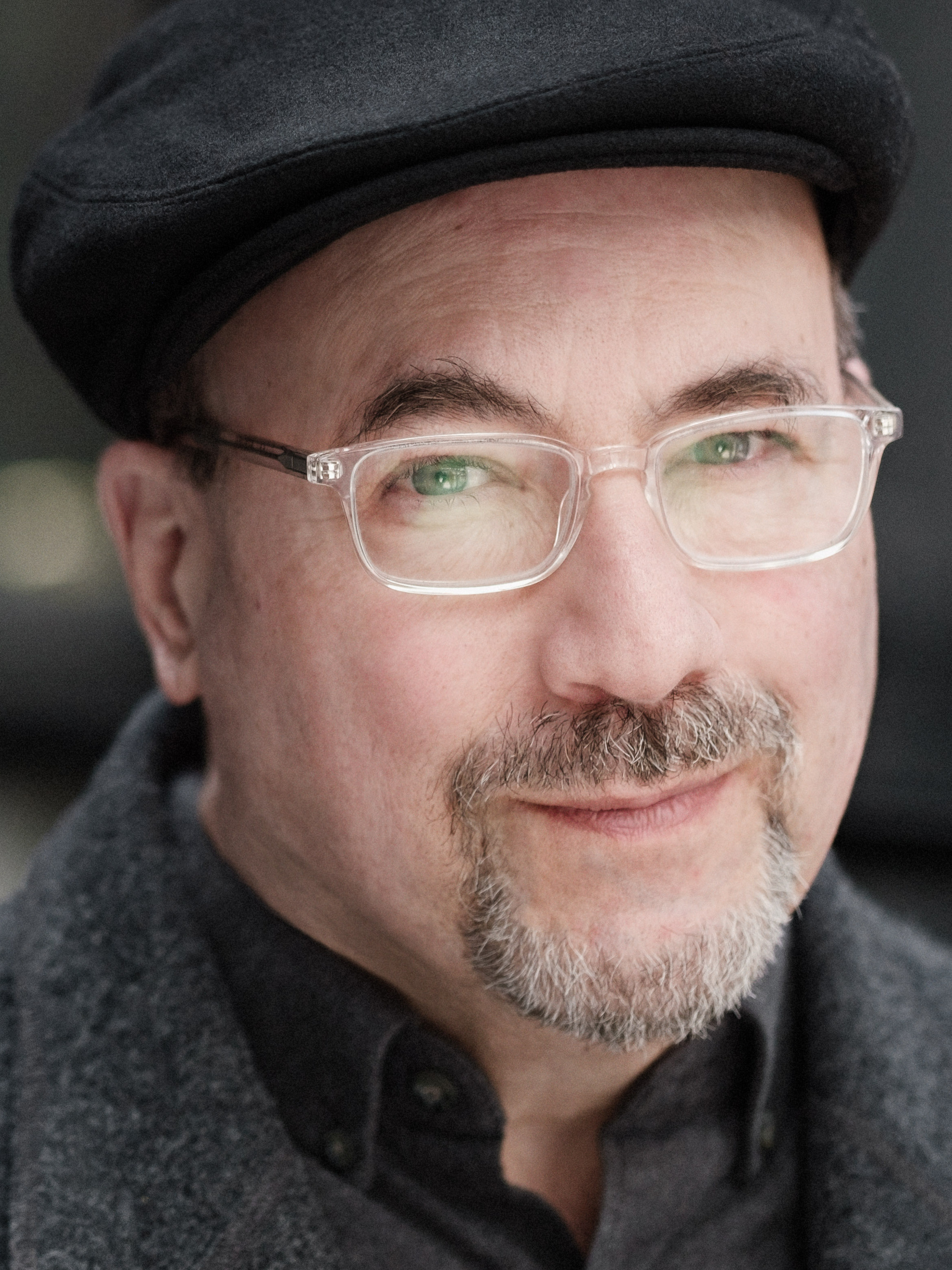
- Newmark in 2023
- Born: Craig Alexander Newmark; December 6, 1952 (age 73); Morristown, New Jersey, U.S.
- Education: Case Western Reserve University (BS, MS)
- Occupation: Philanthropist
- Organization: Craig Newmark Philanthropies
- Known for: Founder of Craigslist
- Spouse: Eileen Whelpley (m. 2012)
- Craig Newmark's voice recorded in September 2023

Craig Alexander Newmark (born December 6, 1952) is an American internet entrepreneur and philanthropist best known as the founder of the classifieds website Craigslist. Before founding Craigslist, he worked as a computer programmer for IBM, Bank of America, and Charles Schwab. Newmark was chief executive officer of Craigslist from its founding until 2000. He founded Craig Newmark Philanthropies in 2015.

== Early life and education ==
Newmark was born to Joyce and Lee Newmark, a bookkeeper and insurance and meat salesman, who were Jewish, in 1952 in Morristown, New Jersey. As a child, Newmark liked science fiction and comic books, and wanted to become a paleontologist. When Newmark was thirteen, his father died from cancer. His mother then moved him and his younger brother, Jeff, to Jacob Ford Village in Morristown.

As a teenager, Newmark attended Morristown High School, where he became interested in physics. He wore taped-together, black-rimmed glasses and a pocket protector. In an interview, he described his high school self as "possible nerd patient zero". During high school, he sang in the school choir, joined the physics club, co-captained the debate team and was in the honor society. Newmark graduated from high school in 1971.

During his freshman year of college, Newmark began studying computer science. He earned Bachelor of Science and Master of Science degrees in computing and information sciences from Case Western Reserve University in 1975 and 1977, respectively.

== Career ==
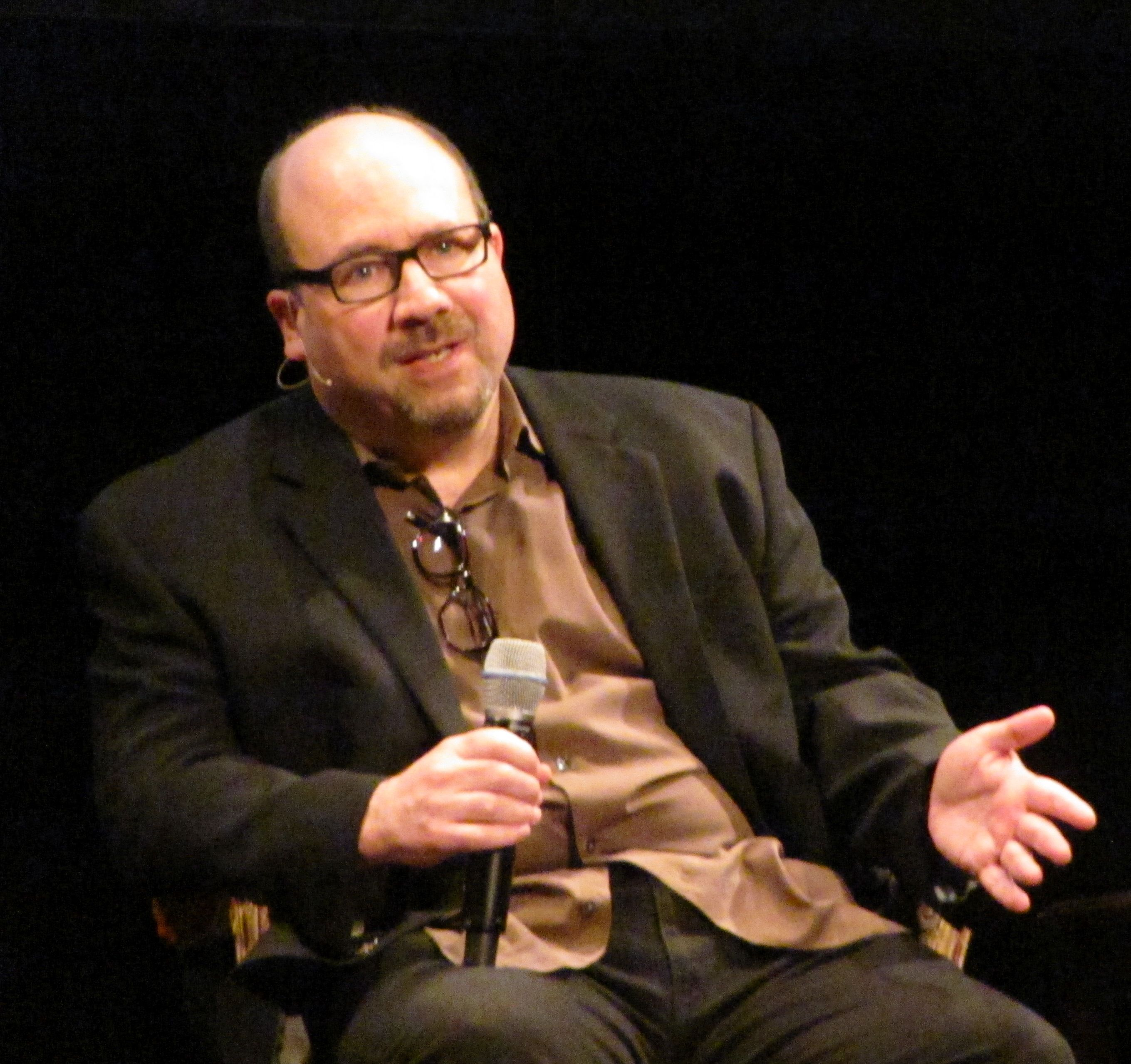
Newmark in 2014

Before establishing Craigslist, Newmark worked as a contract computer programmer for companies such as Bank of America, Sun Microsystems, and others. His first job out of college was with IBM, where he worked for 17 years as a programmer and systems engineer. During that time, he lived in Boca Raton, Florida, Detroit, Michigan, and then Pittsburgh, Pennsylvania. He moved to San Francisco in 1993 after accepting a position with Charles Schwab. There, a coworker introduced him to the World Wide Web—which at the time was still relatively free of commercials.

In 1995, Newmark started emailing a list of upcoming events to a few friends to "cultivate a bit of community". Other people asked to be included on the list and as members grew, so did the kinds of information on the list. Newmark launched craigslist.org in 1996, where people could exchange information, mostly without charge. It started as a newsletter about San Francisco events. He operated it as a hobby while continuing to work as a software engineer until 1999 when he incorporated Craigslist as a private for-profit company. In her book An Internet for the People: The Politics and Promise of craigslist, Jessa Lingel described the website as "the internet ungentrified". In 2000, Newmark stepped down as chief executive officer and handed off the role to Jim Buckmaster. Since then, Newmark has not been involved in the "day-to-day operations" of Craigslist. As of 2018, he continued to respond to Craigslist customer service inquiries, primarily dealing with spammers and scammers.

In 2005, Time magazine listed Craig Newmark as one of the 100 people shaping the world.

Newmark is on the board of several non-profit organizations such as CUNY Graduate School of Journalism, Girls Who Code, and Vets in Tech, among others. He also holds roles on the advisory boards of 18 other non-profits.

== Philanthropy ==
As far back as 2004, Newmark was using his wealth to support philanthropic causes. His philanthropic interests include journalism and cybersecurity. In 2015, he founded Craig Newmark Philanthropies which acts as an umbrella for his other foundations, such as his private charitable foundation, to which he contributed $50 million in 2016 to support military families, voter registration efforts, and women in technology.

In 2018, Newmark's donations totaled $143 million.

The Chronicle of Philanthropy ranked Newmark 17th out of 50 in its 2020 ranking of individual donors, giving a total of $100 million. In 2022, Newmark donated $81 million through the Craig Newmark Foundation and Craig Newmark Philanthropic Fund again ranking in Chronicle of Philanthropy's top 50.

In December 2022, he announced his intention to give almost all of his money to charity.

=== Veterans ===
While consulting for the VA Office of Healthcare Innovation and Learning Newmark dubbed himself "Nerd-in-Residence” while focusing his computer science skills on the Blue Button initiative, which is designed to make electronic health records, including family history, available to all veterans thereby accelerating the processing of claims, improving patient care, and saving lives.

In 2022, Craig Newmark Philanthropies announced a $2.95 million grant to The Bob Woodruff Foundation's Got Your 6 Network. As of 2022, Craig Newmark Philanthropies reported more than $28 million in contributions to military and veteran communities, including Military Veterans in Journalism.

In 2023, Newmark donated $1 million to Blue Star Families, a non-profit organization supporting the families of military personnel and veterans.

In 2023, Craig Newmark Philanthropies donated $10 million to The Bob Woodruff Foundation's Got Your 6 Network at the 17th Annual Stand Up for Heroes fundraiser gala that will support comprehensive mental health services for veterans and their families.

In 2023, Newmark pledged an additional $100 million to organizations focused on veterans and military families.

=== Cybersecurity ===
In January 2017, TechCrunch reported that Newmark donated $500,000 to Wikipedia's attempt at "reducing harassment and vandalism on the site and improve the tools moderators use every day to keep the peace".

In 2019, Newmark donated $6 million to Consumer Reports to fund a Digital Lab focused on consumer privacy rights and cybersecurity.

In 2021, Newmark supported the Institute for Security and Technology's anti-ransomware program; a six-month study on misinformation and disinformation by the Aspen Institute’s Commission on Information Disorder; the establishment of the Institute for Rebooting Social Media at Harvard University; the Reporters Without Borders Journalism Trust Initiative; and provided funding to expand PBS NewsHour's coverage of underrepresented communities.

In 2022, Newmark committed $50 million to the Cyber Civil Defense initiative. As of April 2022, approximately $30 million of this commitment had been awarded.

In 2023, Craig Newmark Philanthropies announced it would double its donations from $50 million to $100 million for fighting cyber threats.

In 2026, Newmark founded a public service campaign, "Take9", encouraging users to pause and think before responding to a text or email to help avoid being scammed. A video for the campaign featured Newmark teaming up with Count von Count from Sesame Street.

Other donations Newmark made include: $1 million to the Global Cyber Alliance, $150,000 to Women in CyberSecurity, and $250,000 to the Girl Scouts for cybersecurity programs. He is also an avid supporter of Girls Who Code.

=== Journalism ===
In 2006, The Guardian reported that Newmark was "readying his armoury of cash to invest in citizen journalism projects".

Between 2016 and 2020, Newmark donated $170 million to support journalism, combating harassment of journalists, cybersecurity, and election integrity, including $1 million each to ProPublica and the Poynter Institute in 2017.

In September 2018, he gave $20 million to fund the creation of The Markup, a non-profit news organization.

That year, Newmark donated $1 million to Mother Jones to help the magazine combat fake news.

In 2021, Newmark donated $5 million to the Shorenstein Center on Media, Politics and Public Policy at Harvard Kennedy School.

Newmark established a $20 million endowment at the CUNY Graduate School of Journalism, which was subsequently renamed the Craig Newmark Graduate School of Journalism.

According to The Chronicle of Philanthropy, Newmark's 2020 donations included $1 million to the Anti-Defamation League.

Newmark gave $5 million to the Poynter Institute, which used the funds to establish the Craig Newmark Center for Ethics and Leadership. Newmark's previous donation of $1 million to the Poynter established the Craig Newmark Journalism Ethics Chair. He also gave $10 million to Columbia University to establish a center for journalism ethics and security, as well as a professorship.

In 2021, Newmark supported the establishment of the Institute for Rebooting Social Media at Harvard University; the Reporters Without Borders Journalism Trust Initiative; and provided funding to expand PBS NewsHour's coverage of underrepresented communities.

As of 2022, it was estimated that Newmark had given between $180 million and $200 million for journalism and fighting disinformation.

In 2024, Craig Newmark Philanthropies announced a $10 million dollar launch gift to the Craig Newmark Graduate School of Journalism at the City University of New York with the aim of eventually making the school tuition-free for all of its students.

Other journalistic causes Newmark has supported include: the Center for Public Integrity, the Center for Investigative Reporting, PolitiFact, the Poynter Institute, Columbia Journalism Review, Columbia's Tow Center for Digital Journalism, The GroundTruth Project, the Berkeley Graduate School of Journalism, and the Berkeley Center for New Media.

=== Other philanthropic activities ===
In 2015, he donated $10,000 to Grow It Green Morristown for the installation of a composting toilet at the Early Street Community Garden. The facility was named "Craig Newmark Memorial Latrine #2". The first toilet Newmark sponsored was in the City of Jericho.

Bloomberg News reported that Newmark donated $10 million to charities focused on hunger issues in 2020, as well.

According to Newmark, as of May 2021 he'd given a total of $25 million to organizations working on food security.

Newmark was among a group of prominent individuals who backed the Marshall Plan for Moms, which called on the Biden Administration to pass policies addressing paid family leave, training programs for women returning to work, and pay equity.

Other examples of organizations and causes Newmark has supported include: OneVoice, Sunlight Foundation, Voto Latino, NYPD Bomb Squad, and the Wikimedia Foundation.

He has given $100,000 to support wildlife rescue groups. Newmark has said that he is involved in pigeon rescue.

In a 2021 interview, Newmark stated that he was looking to "slim down" his charitable giving, in order to simplify how he supports causes and focus more deeply on select areas of interest.

Newmark has described himself as a peasant with money and has a vision of giving away $1 billion dollars, supported by compound interest, before he dies.

== Personal life ==
Newmark married Eileen Whelpley in December 2012, and they enjoy birding together. He currently lives in New York City, flies commercial, does not own a car, wears common clothing, and prefers using public transport.

Newmark describes himself as a non-practicing, secular Jew, joking that his rabbi was the singer Leonard Cohen. He is also a fan of Tori Amos, Lou Reed, and the TV shows Pushing Daisies and The Simpsons.

Newmark's net worth is estimated to be in the hundreds of millions of dollars. In April 2020, Forbes estimated his net worth to be $1.3 billion but he has since dropped off its billionaires list. In an interview published by Nieman Lab in 2017, he called a prior $400 million Forbes estimate of his net worth "bogus" and said that "by monetizing Craigslist the way I did in 1999, I probably gave away already 90 percent or more of my potential net worth."

Newmark opposed the Iraq War and believed White House journalists “failed in their jobs” and did not "speak truth to power". In 2014, he was one of 60 Democratic Party donors who urged the creation of a system of public election funding. In 2016, Newmark joined with the progressive RAD Campaign and Lincoln Park Strategies to commission a poll examining user perceptions about social media conflicts during the 2016 election.

Newmark supported Barack Obama's election campaign in 2008, volunteering for him on the campaign trail as an "official technology surrogate" and praising his use of technology to promote grassroots democracy. In the 2020 election, Newmark supported Joe Biden's campaign, citing his "commitment to fighting corruption" and "record of standing up for our veterans".

In March 2026, Newmark published an article on LinkedIn titled "My politics for-real", writing, "Most of what's assumed or written about my views is bullshit" and "Words like 'liberal' and 'conservative' and even 'libertarian' don't have much meaning anymore. They don't describe me and they don't really describe many people I know."
