= List of awards and nominations received by Ugly Betty =

List of awards won by Ugly Betty
Awards & Nominations
Award	Won	Nominated
American Film Institute	1	1
ALMA Awards	12	15
Art Directors Guild Awards	1	5
BAFTA Awards	0	1
BMI Film & TV Awards	1	1
Casting Society of America Award	1	3
Costume Designers Guild Awards	3	4
Directors Guild of America Awards	1	1
ELLE Style Awards	1	1
Emmy Awards	3	20
Ewwy Awards	0	5
Family Television Awards	2	2
GLAAD Media Awards	2	3
Golden Globe Awards	2	4
Gracie Allen Awards	0	0
ICG Publicists Awards	1	1
Image Awards	5	13
Imagen Foundation Awards	8	11
Kids Choice Awards	0	1
National Television Awards (UK)	0	2
NAACP Image Awards	5	15
NAMIC Awards	1	1
Online Awards	1	1
Peabody Awards	Honoured
Satellite Awards	3	10
People's Choice Awards	0	6
Prism Awards	1	2
Producers Guild of America Awards	1	1
Screen Actors Guild Awards	1	6
Teen Choice Awards	2	15
Television Critics Association Awards	0	3
Time Magazine	Honoured
Young Artist Awards	1	3
Visual Effects Society Awards	0	1
Webby Peoples Voice Awards	0	1
Writers Guild of America Awards	1	2
- Total number of wins and nominations
Totals	62	163
- Footnotes

This article pertains to the awards, nominations and honors given to the ABC dramedy series Ugly Betty. The series so far has been nominated for 160 awards and won 60 of them, including 3 Emmys, 2 Golden Globes, 2 GLAADs, 5 NAACP Image, 8 ALMAs and 3 Satellite Awards. Of most of these achievements, America Ferrera has won an Emmy, a Golden Globe, an NAACP Image, a SAG, 2 ALMAs (one of them for Entertainer of the Year in 2008), and a Teen Choice breakout award. It has also been honored with a Peobody Award and was recognized by the United States Congress. In addition, Ferrera was chosen by Time magazine as one of their 100 most influential people in 2007, due to the portrayal of the series' main character, Betty Suarez.

== ALMA Awards ==
The ALMA Awards honors the Hispanic entertainment community. During its first season, Ugly Betty won four of its first seven nominations and in the second season took home three more, along with a Chevrolet Entertainer of the Year Award for Ferrera for her work on the show. Overall the series has received eleven nominations.

Year	Category	Nomimee	Episode	Result
2007	Outstanding Actress – Television Series, Mini-Series or Television Movie	America Ferrera		Won
2007	Outstanding Supporting Actress – Television Series, Mini-Series or Television Movie	Ana Ortiz		Won
2007	Outstanding Television Series, Mini-Series or Television Movie			Won
2007	Outstanding Writing – Television Series, Mini-Series or Television Movie	Silvio Horta	Pilot	Won
2007	Outstanding Supporting Actor – Television Series, Mini-Series or Television Movie	Mark Indelicato		Nominated
2007	Outstanding Supporting Actor – Television Series, Mini-Series or Television Movie	Tony Plana		Nominated
2007	Outstanding Writing – Television Series, Mini-Series or Television Movie	Dailyn Rodriguez	After Hours	Nominated
2008	Chevrolet Entertainer of the Year Award	America Ferrera		Won
2008	Outstanding Director of a Television Series	Linda Mendoza	Betty's Baby Bump	Won
2008	Outstanding Performance of a Latino-Led Ensemble in a Television Series			Won
2008	Outstanding Writing for a Television Series	Silvio Horta	Jump	Won
2009	Outstanding Comedy Actress	America Ferrera		Nominated
2009	Outstanding Comedy Actress	Ana Ortiz		Nominated
2009	Outstanding Comedy Actor	Mark Indelicato		Nominated
2009	Outstanding Comedy Actor	Tony Plana		Nominated
2009	Year Behind the Scenes – Hair Stylist	Mary Ann Valdes (Twilight/Ugly Betty)		Won

== Directors Guild of America Awards ==
Year	Category	Director	Episode	Result
2007	Outstanding Directorial Achievement in Comedy Series	Richard Shepard	"Pilot"	Won

== Emmy Awards ==
In its ongoing run, Ugly Betty has been nominated for twenty Emmy Awards. In 2007, it won three awards including the Primetime Emmy Award for Outstanding Casting in a Comedy Series and a best Actress in a Comedy series for America Ferrera. The series was also nominated in the category for Outstanding Comedy Series, alongside Entourage, The Office, Two and a Half Men and 30 Rock, the latter having won the honor. In addition series creator Salma Hayek and Judith Light competed for the Best Guest Starring Actress in a Comedy award but both lost to 30 Rock's Elaine Stritch at that year's awards ceremony for her portrayal of Colleen Donaghy in the season one finale, "Hiatus."

=== Primetime Emmy Awards ===
Year	Category	Nominee(s)	Episode	Result
2007	Outstanding Comedy Series	Silvio Horta, Salma Hayek, Ben Silverman Marco Pennette, James D. Parriott, James Hayman, Jose Tamez, Teri Weinberg, Sheila R. Lawrence, Oliver Goldstick, Alice West, Henry Alonso Myers, Harry Werksman and Gabrielle G. Stanton		Nominated
2007	Outstanding Guest Actress in a Comedy Series	Judith Light		Nominated
2007	Outstanding Guest Actress in a Comedy Series	Salma Hayek		Nominated
2007	Outstanding Directing for a Comedy Series	Richard Shepard	"Pilot"	Won
2007	Outstanding Lead Actress in a Comedy Series	America Ferrera		Won
2007	Outstanding Supporting Actress in a Comedy Series	Vanessa L. Williams		Nominated
2008	Outstanding Lead Actress in a Comedy Series	America Ferrera		Nominated
2008	Outstanding Supporting Actress in a Comedy Series	Vanessa Williams		Nominated
2009	Outstanding Supporting Actress in a Comedy Series	Vanessa Williams		Nominated

=== Creative Arts Emmy Awards ===
Year	Category	Nominee(s)	Episode	Result
2007	Outstanding Casting for a Comedy Series	Libby Goldstein and Junie Lowry-Johnson		Won
2007	Outstanding Original Main Title Design	Garson Yu and Yolanda Santasosa		Nominated
2007	Outstanding Art Direction for a Single Camera Series	Mark Worthington, Jim Wallis and Archie D'Amico	"The Box and the Bunny"	Nominated
2007	Outstanding Costumes for a Series	Eduardo Castro and Michael R. Chapman	"I'm Coming Out"	Nominated
2007	Outstanding Hairstyling for a Series	Mary Ann Valdes, Linda Kaye Walker and Norma Lee	"I'm Coming Out"	Nominated
2008	Outstanding Casting for a Comedy Series	Jeff Greenberg and Mark Scott		Nominated
2008	Outstanding Costumes for a Series	Eduardo Castro and Michael Chapman	"Bananas for Betty"	Nominated
2008	Outstanding Hairstyling for a Single-Camera Series	Mary Ann Valdes, Lynda K. Walker, Norma Lee and Kimi Messina	"A Nice Day for a Posh Wedding"	Nominated
2008	Outstanding Art Direction for a Single-Camera Series	Mark Worthington, Jim Wallis and Archie D'Amico	"How Betty Got Her Grieve Back"	Nominated
2009	Outstanding Costumes for a Series	Patricia Field and Molly Rogers	"In the Stars"	Nominated

== Golden Globe Awards ==
Ugly Betty has been nominated for four awards and won two Golden Globes so far in its run. The first two awards were both won by America Ferrera for Best Actress and for the series itself in 2007.

Year	Category	Nominee(s)	Result
2006	Best Television Series – Comedy or Musical		Won
2006	Best Performance by an Actress in a Television Series – Comedy or Musical	America Ferrera	Won
2007	Best Performance by an Actress in a Television Series – Comedy or Musical	America Ferrera	Nominated
2008	Best Performance by an Actress in a Television Series – Comedy or Musical	America Ferrera	Nominated

== GLAAD Media Awards ==
The Series has won two consecutive GLAAD Media Awards for its portrayal of its LGBT characters and their storylines, as played by actors Michael Urie and Rebecca Romijn.

Year	Category	Nominee(s)	Result
2007	Outstanding Comedy Series		Won
2008	Outstanding Comedy Series		Won
2009	Outstanding Comedy Series		Nominated

== Imagen Foundation Awards ==
Year	Category	Nominee(s)	Result
2007	Best Actress	America Ferrera	Won
2007	Best Supporting Actress	Ana Ortiz	Won
2007	Best TV series		Won
2008	Best Supporting Actor	Tony Plana	Won
2008	Best TV series		Won
2008	Best Actress	America Ferrera	Nominated
2008	Best Supporting Actress	Ana Ortiz	Nominated
2009	Best Actress	America Ferrera	Won
2009	Best Supporting Actress	Ana Ortiz	Won
2009	Best TV series		Nominated
2009	Creative Achievement Honour	Silvio Horta	Won
2010	Best Actress	America Ferrera	Won

== NAACP Image Awards ==
Although The NAACP Image Awards honors African Americans in the entertainment industry, the series has won five of the Image Awards' eight major TV categories, a rarity among television series with a multicultural cast. In addition to winning an Image award for the TV series in 2007 and Ferrera for best actress in 2008, Vanessa Williams has won back to back honors (in 2007 and 2008) in the Supporting Actress category for her portrayal of Wilhelmina Slater.

Year	Category	Nominee(s)	Result
2007	Outstanding Comedy Series		Won
2007	Outstanding Lead Actress in a Comedy Series	America Ferrera	Nominated
2007	Outstanding Supporting Actress in a Comedy Series	Vanessa L. Williams	Won
2007	Outstanding Writing in a Comedy Series	Silvio Horta	Won
2008	Outstanding Comedy Series		Nominated
2008	Outstanding Lead Actress in a Comedy Series	America Ferrera	Won
2008	Outstanding Supporting Actress in a Comedy Series	Vanessa L. Williams	Won
2008	Outstanding Writing in a Comedy Series	Silvio Horta	Nominated
2009	Outstanding Comedy Series		Nominated
2009	Outstanding Lead Actress in a Comedy Series	America Ferrera	Nominated
2009	Outstanding Supporting Actress in a Comedy Series	Vanessa L. Williams	Nominated
2009	Outstanding Directing in a Comedy Series	Victor Nelly Jr for Crush'd	Nominated
2009	Outstanding Writing in a Comedy Series	Tracy Poust & Jon Kinally for Crush'd	Nominated
2010	Outstanding Comedy Series		Nominated
2010	Outstanding Lead Actress in a Comedy Series	America Ferrera	Nominated
2010	Outstanding Supporting Actress in a Comedy Series	Ana Ortiz	Nominated
2010	Outstanding Supporting Actress in a Comedy Series	Vanessa L. Williams	Nominated

== Satellite Awards ==
Year	Category	Nominee(s)	Result
2007	Best TV Series Musical or Comedy		Won
2007	Best Actress – TV Series Musical or Comedy	America Ferrera	Nominated
2007	Best Supporting Actor – TV Series Musical or Comedy	Tony Plana	Won
2007	Best Supporting Actress – TV Series Musical or Comedy	Vanessa L. Williams	Nominated
2008	Best TV Series Musical or Comedy		Nominated
2008	Best Actress – TV Series Musical or Comedy	America Ferrera	Won
2008	Best Supporting Actress – TV Series Musical or Comedy	Vanessa L. Williams	Won
2008	Best DVD release		Nominated
2009	Best Actress – TV Series Musical or Comedy	America Ferrera	Nominated
2010	Best Supporting Actress – TV Series Musical or Comedy	Vanessa Williams	Nominated

== Screen Actors Guild Awards ==
Year	Category	Nominee(s)	Result
2007	Outstanding Performance by an Ensemble in a Comedy Series		Nominated
2007	Outstanding Performance by a Female Actor in a Comedy Series	America Ferrera	Won
2008	Outstanding Performance by a Female Actor in a Comedy Series	America Ferrera	Nominated
2008	Outstanding Performance by a Female Actor in a Comedy Series	Vanessa L. Williams	Nominated
2008	Outstanding Performance by an Ensemble in a Comedy Series		Nominated
2009	Outstanding Performance by a Female Actor in a Comedy Series	America Ferrera	Nominated

== Teen Choice Awards ==
Year	Category	Nominee(s)	Result
2007	Choice Breakout TV	America Ferrera	Won
2007	Choice Breakout TV Villain	Vanessa Williams	Won
2007	Choice TV Actress: Comedy	America Ferrera	Nominated
2007	Choice TV Show: Comedy		Nominated
2007	Choice TV Show: Breakout		Nominated
2008	Choice TV Actress: Comedy	America Ferrera	Nominated
2008	Choice TV Actor: Comedy	Michael Urie	Nominated
2008	Choice TV Villain	Vanessa Williams	Nominated
2008	Choice TV Show: Comedy		Nominated
2009	Choice TV Actress: Comedy	America Ferrera	Nominated
2009	Choice TV Villain	Vanessa Williams	Nominated
2009	Choice TV Show: Comedy		Nominated
2009	Choice TV Fabulous	Michael Urie	Nominated
2009	Choice TV Sidekick	Michael Urie	Nominated
2009	Choice TV Parential Unit	Tony Plana	Nominated

== Television Critics Association Awards ==
Year	Category	Nominee(s)	Result
2007	Individual Achievement in Comedy	America Ferrera	Nominated
2007	Outstanding Achievement in Comedy		Nominated
2007	Outstanding New Program of the Year		Nominated

== Writers Guild of America Awards ==
Year	Category	Nominee(s)	Result
2007	Best New Series		Won
2009	Episodic Comedy	Tracy Poust & Jon Kinnally for Crush'd	Nominated

== Other awards ==
In addition to the major awards listed above, the series has also been recognized in the awards listed below:

=== Season one (2006–2007) ===
Year	Result	Award	Category	Recipient
2006	Won	Family Television Awards	Best New Series	
2007	Nominated	33rd People's Choice Awards	Favorite New TV Drama	
2007	Nominated	National Television Awards (UK)	Most Popular Comedy	
2007	Won	ICG Publicists Awards	Outstanding Television Series	
2007	Won	ELLE Style Awards	Outstanding Comedy Series	
2007	Won	9th Costume Designers Guild Awards	Outstanding Contemporary Television Series || Eduardo Castro	
2007	Won	Art Directors Guild Awards	Excellence in Production Design—Single Camera Television Series	Mark Worthington
2007	Nominated	Prism Awards	Individual Achievement in Comedy	Judith Light
2007	Won	American Film Institute	AFI TV Program of the year	
2007	Nominated	Casting Society of America	Comedy Episodic Casting	Junie Lowry Johnson
2007	Won	Casting Society of America	Comedy Pilot Episodic Casting	Junie Lowry Johnson and Bernard Telsey

=== Season two (2007–2008) ===
Year	Result	Award	Category	Recipient
2009	Nominated	Art Directors Guild Awards	Excellence in Production Design—Single Camera Television Series	Mark Worthington
2007	Won	Family Television Awards	Best Comedy Series	
2007	Won	BMI Film and TV Awards	BMI Music of the year	Jeff Beal
2008	Winner	10th Costume Designers Guild Awards	Outstanding Contemporary Television Series	Eduardo Castro
2008	Nominated	National Television Awards (UK)	Most Popular Comedy	
2008	Nominated	34th People's Choice Awards	Favorite TV Comedy	
2008	Nominated	PGA Awards	Television Producer of the Year in Episodic	Salma Hayek, James Hayman, Silvio Horta, James D. Parriott, Marco Pennette, Benjamin Silverman, Jose Tamez, Teri Weinberg, Alice West
2008	Nominated	Prism Awards	Performance in Comedy Series	Eric Mabius
2008	Nominated	Visual Effects Society Awards	Outstanding Created Environment in a Live Action Broadcast Program or Commercial	Christopher D. Martin, Michael Cook and Cedric Tomacruz For "A League of Their Own".
2008	Won	Young Artists Awards	Best Performance in a TV Series-Guest Starring Young Actress	Jasmine Jessica Anthony
2008	Nominated	Young Artists Awards	Best Performance in a TV Series-Supporting Young Actor	Mark Indelicato
2008	Nominated	BAFTA Awards, Scotland	Acting Performance in Television	Ashley Jensen
2008	Nominated	Casting Society of America	Episodic Comedy Casting	
2008	Nominated	Ewwy Awards	Best Comedy Series	
2008	Nominated	Ewwy Awards	Best Supporting Actor in a Comedy Series	Michael Urie
2008	Nominated	Ewwy Awards	Best Supporting Actress in a Comedy Series	Becki Newton
2008	Won	Gay People's Choice Awards	Best Comedy Series	
2008	Nominated	Gay People's Choice Awards	Favorite Female TV Star	America Ferrera
2008	Nominated	Gay People's Choice Awards	Favorite Female TV Star	Vanessa Williams
2008	Nominated	Gay People's Choice Awards	Favorite Male TV Star	Michael Urie

=== Season three (2008–2009) ===
Year	Result	Award	Category	Recipient
2009	Nominated	35th People's Choice Awards	Favorite TV Comedy	
2009	Nominated	Art Directors Guild Awards	Excellence in Production Design—Single Camera Television Series	Mark Worthington
2009	Won	11th Costume Designers Guild Awards	Outstanding Contemporary Television Series	Eduardo Castro and Patricia Field
2009	Nominated	Kids Choice Awards	Favorite Female Television Actress	America Ferrera
2009	Nominated	TV Quick and Choice Awards (UK)	Best International Show	
2009	Nominated	Webby Peoples Voice Awards	Webisodes "Mode After Hours	Michael Urie and Becki Newton
2009	Nominated	Young Artist Awards	Best Performance by a Supporting Young Actor in a Comedy or Drama Series	Mark Indelicato
2009	Won	NAMIC Awards	Best Comedy Series	
2009	Nominated	Ewwy Awards	Best Supporting Actor in a Comedy Series	Michael Urie
2009	Nominated	Ewwy Awards	Best Supporting Actress in a Comedy Series	Becki Newton
2009	Nominated	35th Peoples Choice Awards	Choice TV Comedy	
2009	Nominated	35th Peoples Choice Awards	Choice TV Comedy Actress	America Ferrera
2009	Nominated	35th Peoples Choice Awards	Choice TV Comedy Actress	Vanessa Williams
2009	Won	After Elton.com's Divisibility Awards 2009	TV Comedy Of the Year	

=== Season four (2009–2010) ===
Year	Result	Award	Category	Recipient
2010	Nominated	Art Directors Guild Awards	Excellence in Production Design—Single Camera Television Series	Mark Worthington
2010	Nominated	American Society of Cinematographers	Outstanding Achievement in Cinematography in Episodic/Pilot Television	Michael A. Price
2010	Nominated	Dorian Awards	Outstanding Comedy Series	
2010	Nominated	12th Costume Designers Guild Awards	Outstanding Contemporary Television Series	Patricia Field
2010	Nominated	Gay Peoples Choice Awards	Favorite TV Comedy Series	
2010	Nominated	Gay Peoples Choice Awards	Favorite Female TV Star	America Ferrera
2010	Nominated	Gay Peoples Choice Awards	Favorite TV Ensemble Cast	
2010	Nominated	Lesbian/Bi Peoples Choice Awards	Favorite Female TV Star	America Ferrera
2010	Nominated	Lesbian/Bi Peoples Choice Awards	Favorite TV Comedy Series	
2010	Nominated	Ewwy Awards	Outstanding Comedy Series	
2010	Nominated	Ewwy Awards	Outstanding Supporting Actress in a Comedy Series	Vanessa L. Williams

== Peabody Award ==
On June 4, 2007, the series was honored with a Peabody Award for its storylines, which explores clashing concepts of beauty, class, race and footwear with intelligence, warmth and wit.

== Other accolades ==
- The show's impact on issues and culture has also attracted the attention of the United States Congress, where on January 17, 2007 California congresswoman Hilda Solis (D-32nd, El Monte) saluted Ferrera on both her Golden Globe win and for bringing a positive profile to the Latin and Hispanic communities.
- On May 8, 2007, star America Ferrera was honored by Time Magazine on their annual list of the 100 most influential people. The event took place at New York's Lincoln Center and the actress was recognized for defying stereotypes with the show .
