= Ugly Betty season 2 =

Ugly Betty
- Season 2
- Promotional poster
- No. of episodes: 18

Release
- Original network: ABC
- Original release: September 27, 2007 – May 22, 2008

Season chronology
- ← Previous; Season 1 Next → Season 3

The second season of the American comedy-drama television series Ugly Betty started on September 27, 2007, in the United States and Canada, while the second part of the season began airing on April 24, 2008.

The season was originally set to include minimum 20 episodes, but due to the 2007–08 Writers Guild of America strike, it was shortened to 18 episodes.

Season 2 was the last to be produced in Los Angeles as the show returned to New York City, where the pilot episode had been shot, for seasons 3 and 4.

== Cast ==
All of the main cast from the show's first season returned for the second season, with the exception of Kevin Sussman (who had portrayed Walter). In addition, Christopher Gorham (Henry) and Judith Light (Claire) were upgraded to the main cast.

=== Starring ===
- America Ferrera as Betty Suarez
- Eric Mabius as Daniel Meade
- Alan Dale as Bradford Meade (episode 1–10)
- Rebecca Romijn as Alexis Meade
- Judith Light as Claire Meade
- Vanessa L. Williams as Wilhelmina Slater
- Becki Newton as Amanda Tanen
- Ana Ortiz as Hilda Suarez
- Ashley Jensen as Christina McKinney
- Tony Plana as Ignacio Suarez
- Michael Urie as Marc St. James
- Mark Indelicato as Justin Suarez
- Christopher Gorham as Henry Grubstick

=== Recurring roles ===
- David Blue as Cliff St. Paul
- John Cho as Kenny
- Eddie Cibrian as Coach Tony Diaz
- Illeana Douglas as Sheila
- Max Greenfield as Nick Pepper
- Jayma Mays as Charlie
- Alec Mapa as Suzuki St. Pierre
- Derek Riddell as Stuart
- Freddy Rodriguez as Giovanni ‘Gio’ Rossi
- Lorraine Toussaint as Amelia ‘Yoga’ Bluman
- Gabrielle Union as Renee Slater

=== Guest stars ===
- Kevin Alejandro as Santos
- Barry Bostwick as Roger Adams
- Julian de la Celle as Daniel Jr.
- Bailey Chase as Beckett ‘Becks’ Scott
- Daniel Davis as Dr. Morgan Remus
- Eliza Dushku as Cameron Ashlock
- Rick Fox as Dwayne
- Victor Garber as Professor Barrett
- Ava Gaudet as Gina Gambarro
- Lindsay Lohan as Kimberly Keegan
- Mo’Nique as L’Amanda
- Annie Potts as Linda
- Marlo Thomas as Sandra Winthrop
- James Van Der Beek as Luke Carnes

The second season also contained cameo appearances by Victoria Beckham, Bow Wow, Naomi Campbell, Kenneth Cole, Nina García, Larry King, Roberta Myers, Omarion, Gene Simmons, Christian Siriano, Vera Wang, Betty White and Joe Zee, all appearing as themselves. In addition, Megan Hilty and Eden Espinosa, stars of the stage musical Wicked, appear as their Wicked characters.

== Broadcast history ==
Mika’s song, "Big Girl (You Are Beautiful)", a top-10 hit in the UK, was used as a promotional tool for the second season, with the altered lyric "Hey Betty, you are beautiful" and a music video featuring the cast.

In Australia, the show was put on hiatus after the July 2, 2008, episode due to the 2008 Summer Olympics. However, after the Olympics, only one episode, "Bananas for Betty", was shown on August 28, 2008, before the show was cancelled for no apparent reason. After the Australian network received complaints, the show went back to air on December 2, 2008, where it aired twice a week on Tuesdays and Thursdays. The final episode aired on Thursday, January 15, 2009.

== Episodes ==
No. overall	No. in season	Title	Directed by	Written by	Original release date	U.S. viewers (millions)
24	1	"How Betty Got Her Grieve Back"	James Hayman	Silvio Horta & Marco Pennette	September 27, 2007	11.16
Set three weeks after the events of the season 1 finale, Ignacio is still in Mexico, Alexis is in a coma while Daniel is recovering from the crash, Hilda is grieving in her own way for Santos, and Betty keeps herself busy at Mode to distract herself from her unresolved feelings for Henry. Amanda confronts her parents with the truth about her birth mother, Claire is in hiding after escaping from transport to another prison and Alexis wakes up from her coma with amnesia, having no knowledge of her gender transition.
25	2	"Family/Affair"	Victor Nelli, Jr.	Bill Wrubel	October 4, 2007	9.78
Bradford tries to change the Meade family history by taking advantage of Alexis's amnesia; Betty suspects Wilhelmina's new bodyguard is doing a lot more than protecting her; Ignacio is in for a surprise from his past; Amanda receives a portion of Fey's inheritance...and the expenses and fees that come with it.
26	3	"Betty's Wait Problem"	Tricia Brock	Jon Kinnally & Tracy Poust	October 11, 2007	10.35
Even as Henry returns to Mode, Betty finds herself attracted to (and annoyed by) Gio, the snack canteen operator; Wilhelmina, Claire and Amanda bring a lot more unexpected surprises and expose secrets at the Meade Black & White Ball.
27	4	"Grin and Bear It"	Tucker Gates	Sarah Kucserka & Veronica Becker	October 18, 2007	9.67
Betty tries to impress her writing class teacher with a story that was written by someone else; Daniel is pressured by an advertiser to fire Alexis; Henry tries to help Justin with his math homework; Amanda learns about Wilhelmina's past and the connection she has to finding Amanda's father.
28	5	"A League of Their Own"	Wendey Stanzler	Sheila Lawrence	October 25, 2007	9.84
Betty turns to Internet dating after trying to avoid Henry fails. Justin's rebellious behaviour continues, while Hilda starts sharing her depression with three old ladies whose husbands have also died. Marc meets fashion photographer Cliff St. Paul. The Mode staff discover they will be broke in 90 days if their current rate of advertising drop-out continues. Claire schemes to kill Wilhelmina while Alexis begins remembering things from when she was a man and still against Bradford, resulting in her realization it was she who caused her and Daniel's recent car crash.
29	6	"Something Wicked This Way Comes"	Wendey Stanzler	Henry Alonso Myers	November 1, 2007	9.90
Daniel tries to find advertiser support after Bradford favours Alexis to pull in money for Mode, while Betty's friends and family try to distract her from being "lonely" over Henry. However, Henry and Betty have plans to see Wicked, but Daniel is still in the dark over their reunification so Betty is forced to pretend she is attending with annoying sandwich-maker, Gio. Meanwhile, Wilhelmina is still fretting about her upcoming wedding, attempting to gain weight to fit into her dress.
30	7	"A Nice Day for a Posh Wedding"	James Hayman	Silvio Horta & Marco Pennette	November 8, 2007	10.89
Wilhelmina and Bradford's wedding day has finally arrived, but her maid of honour, Victoria Beckham is receiving all the attention; however Wilhelmina is still primarily concerned with marrying Bradford so she can take over Mode. On the day of his citizenship ceremony, Ignacio finds out about Betty and Henry's resumed romance. Christina's husband turns up at Mode.
31	8	"I See Me, I.C.U."	Rodman Flender	Bill Wrubel	November 15, 2007	10.73
Bradford lies unconscious in intensive care following his heart attack at the altar. Claire asks Betty to check Bradford's will before she leaves the country, but Marc and Wilhelmina are also scheming to get to it.
32	9	"Giving Up the Ghost"	Gary Winick	Charles Pratt, Jr.	November 22, 2007	7.49
Betty begins seeing Bradford's ghost as a manifestation of her guilt over not taking her job back at Mode. After Claire fires Wilhelmina as creative director of Mode at Bradford's funeral, Wilhelmina unleashes a virus on the Mode computer network which deletes all the files of the upcoming issue and takes the opportunity to try to sway the Mode staff to join her new magazine, Slater. Betty gets back on board to help get a new issue out on time, but plans to re-shoot a cover featuring a model in rehab fall apart after she relapses and Alexis attempts to reason with a dwarf printer.
33	10	"Bananas for Betty"	Michael Spiller	Jon Kinnally & Tracy Poust	December 6, 2007	9.34
A video message recorded by Bradford for Alexis and Daniel specifying who will run Meade Publications causes conflict between the siblings after a technical error prevents them from finding out who, so they decide to settle it out in a paintball war. Slater is having trouble getting off the ground due to lack of financial support and Wilhelmina's insistence on looking younger. Hilda sets up her own beauty salon with help from Gio and Henry, but after Betty hears Gio's romantic approach to how he would spend his last days with someone, she begins to think she and Henry are not doing enough with their time left together.
34	11	"Zero Worship"	Ron Underwood	Dawn DeKeyser	January 10, 2008	9.89
Amanda turns to a psychic in her quest to find her birth father; Betty wants Daniel to use models of all shapes and sizes at Fashion Week after Justin's friends get a different impression on their class tour of Mode, but Alexis proves an obstacle due to her domineering ways. Meanwhile, Wilhelmina is hormonal and trying to find someone to be a surrogate mother for her baby.
35	12	"Odor in the Court"	Victor Nelli, Jr.	Bill Wrubel	January 17, 2008	9.52
Claire's trial for the murder of Fey Sommers begins, and she pleads not guilty due to insanity. Claire gives Betty her perfume, which drives her to become hyperactive, and may just be the evidence to prove Claire's innocence, while Amanda discovers pages of Fey's diary which reveal secrets of her affair with Bradford. Christina is propositioned by Wilhelmina to be the surrogate mother for Bradford's child.
36	13	"A Thousand Words Before Friday"	Matt Shakman	Sheila Lawrence & Henry Alonso Myers	January 24, 2008	8.92
Betty learns that an author she's been assigned to write an article on actually writes books on picking up women; Daniel dates a woman who happens to be Wilhelmina's sister; and Amanda and Marc believe that they might have finally found Amanda's biological father, Gene Simmons.
37	14	"Twenty Four Candles"	Michael Spiller	Sarah Kucserka & Veronica Becker	April 24, 2008	8.52
It is Betty's 24th birthday and she wants it to be perfect. Unfortunately, her plan of going out with Henry is disrupted when Charlie returns to New York to be with him, but Gio still tries to give Betty a dream birthday. Meanwhile, Daniel is still dating Renee, whom Wilhelmina unsuccessfully tries to keep him away from, and Claire's plans for her new magazine Hot Flash hit a snag after the budget becomes too pricey.
38	15	"Burning Questions"	Matt Shakman	Henry Alonso Myers	May 1, 2008	7.93
Renee becomes increasingly jealous and controlling after her lack of proper medication begins to take effect, and convinces Daniel that Betty is in love with him; meanwhile, Betty and Christina discover her dangerous past. Henry tells Betty that Charlie will be staying in New York until the baby's born after she has a panic attack at the airport, while Betty grows ever closer to Gio. Gina Gambarro returns to Queens with a new life, and Mode tries to woo a designer who is only shooting for one fashion magazine.
39	16	"Betty's Baby Bump"	Linda Mendoza	Story by : Dawn DeKeyser; Teleplay by : Bill Wrubel	May 8, 2008	7.99
Charlie continues to get in the way of Henry and Betty's dates, so after advising Daniel to go to therapy to deal with his emotional problems over Renee, Betty decides to change her own routine and befriend Charlie (again). Justin's PE teacher, Coach Diaz, threatens to fail him, but Hilda is not impressed. Wilhelmina plans to return to Mode, and Christina discovers the baby she's carrying is from Bradford's sperm.
40	17	"The Kids Are Alright"	Wendey Stanzler	Brian Tanen	May 15, 2008	8.47
Betty, still missing Henry, fights her attraction to Gio, but later finds herself stuck with him when both volunteer to chaperone Justin's middle school dance. Meanwhile, Hilda tries to get Coach Diaz (guest star Eddie Cibrian) to notice her; Amanda agrees to do a reality show with her dad, Kiss rock legend Gene Simmons; and Daniel feels the heat when Wilhelmina makes her triumphant return to Mode amid a media frenzy.
41	18	"Jump"	Victor Nelli, Jr.	Silvio Horta	May 22, 2008	8.75
Wilhelmina becomes the new editor-in-chief of Mode magazine. Elle magazine go head-to-head with Mode in a softball game, where a teenager arrives who may be Meade-related. Meanwhile, Henry comes back to propose to Betty, just after Gio asks her to come to Rome with him for a holiday. Naomi Campbell guest stars as an Elle magazine softball champion, and Lindsay Lohan stars as one of Betty's old classmates.

Notes:

- Season 2 was originally slated to have a total of 24 episodes, but due to the Writers Guild of America strike, it had 18 episodes with the last five written and produced following the strike's end.

== DVD release ==
DVD name	Ep #	Release dates			Additional Features
DVD name	Ep #	Region 1	Region 2	Region 4	Additional Features
The Complete Second Season – Brighter, Bolder, Bettyer	18	September 9, 2008	November 10, 2008	November 10, 2008	This five disc box set contains all 18 episodes from the second season.

Walt Disney Studios Home Entertainment release of Ugly Betty Season Second, subtitled "Brighter, Bolder, Bettyer", would be September 9, 2008 in the United States and Canada. All 18 episodes were included in the set, along with additional bonus tracks.

Among the features:

- On Set With The Besties
- The Suarez Tour
- Wihelmina Slater: Love to Hate Her
- Las Pasiones De Telenovelas
- I ♥ Betty
- Bettly Bloops
- Deleted Scenes

== Ratings ==
=== United States ===
Episode #	Title	Airdate	Rating	Share	18–49	Viewers (millions)	Rank
24	"How Betty Got Her Grieve Back" TVPG-DL	September 27, 2007	7.4	12	3.9	11.16	#28
25	"Family/Affair" TVPG-DLSV	October 4, 2007	7.4	11	3.4	9.78	#31
26	"Betty's Wait Problem" TVPG-DLV	October 11, 2007	7.3	11	3.5	10.35	#29
27	"Grin and Bear It" TVPG-L	October 18, 2007	7.8	12	3.1	9.67	#35
28	"A League of Their Own" TVPG-L	October 25, 2007	7.7	12	3.2	9.84	#34
29	"Something Wicked This Way Comes" TVPG-DL	November 1, 2007	7.3	12	3.4	9.90	#27
30	"It's a Nice Day for a Posh Wedding" TVPG-LS	November 8, 2007	7.7	13	3.5	10.89	#25
31	"I See Me, I.C.U." TVPG-DL	November 15, 2007	7.6	14	3.5	10.73	#29
32	"Giving Up the Ghost" TVPG-DL	November 22, 2007	5.3	9	2.2	7.49	#50
33	"Bananas for Betty" TVPG-DLV	December 6, 2007	6.4	10	2.8	9.34	#26
34	"Zero Worship" TVPG-DL	January 10, 2008	6.7	11	3.2	9.89	#27
35	"Odor in the Court" TV14-DL	January 17, 2008	6.4	10	3.0	9.52	#25
36	"A Thousand Words Before Friday" TVPG-DL	January 24, 2008	6.2	10	3.0	8.92	#23
37	"Twenty Four Candles" TVPG-DL	April 24, 2008	6.0	10	2.5	8.52	#32
38	"Burning Questions" TVPG-LV	May 1, 2008	5.6	9	2.4	7.93	#37
39	"Betty's Baby Bump" TVPG-DLS	May 8, 2008	5.6	9	2.4	7.99	#36
40	"The Kids Are Alright" TVPG-DL	May 15, 2008	5.9	10	2.7	8.47	#29
41	"Jump" TVPG-DL	May 22, 2008	6.2	11	2.8	8.75	#17

=== United Kingdom ===
Ugly Betty was aired on Channel 4 on a usual time of Fridays at 9.00pm. These figures are official ratings released by BARB.

Episode #	Title	Airdate	Viewers (millions)	Channel 4 weekly rank^{a}
24	"How Betty Got Her Grieve Back	October 5, 2007	2.82	1
25	"Family/Affair"	October 12, 2007	2.11	18
26	"Betty's Wait Problem"	October 19, 2007	2.19	9
27	"Grin and Bear It"	October 26, 2007	2.11	19
28	"A League of Their Own"	November 2, 2007	2.19	18
29	"Something Wicked This Way Comes"	November 9, 2007	2.04	24
30	"It's a Nice Day for a Posh Wedding"	November 23, 2007	2.42	18
31	"I See Me, I.C.U."	November 30, 2007	1.92	28
32	"Giving Up the Ghost"	December 7, 2007	2.16	22
33	"Bananas for Betty"	December 14, 2007	1.75	28
34	"Zero Worship"	September 5, 2008	3.12	8
35	"Odor in the Court"	September 12, 2008	2.12	11
36	"A Thousand Words Before Friday"	September 19, 2008	1.83	22
37	"Twenty Four Candles"	September 26, 2008	1.66	27
38	"Burning Questions"	October 3, 2008	1.7	30
39	"Betty's Baby Bump"	October 3, 2008	1.65	31
40	"The Kids Are Alright"	October 10, 2008	1.63	30
41	"Jump"	October 17, 2008	1.68	30

^{a} Ranks are for Channel 4 weekly, not for overall TV.

The gap between "Bananas for Betty" on December 14, 2007, and "Zero Worship" was taken for three reasons:

1. Channel 4 was originally scheduled to take a three-week break at Christmas and resume episodes in January; this hadn't happened.

2. The 2007–2008 WGA strike meant only three episodes were left after the last episode, so Channel 4 decided it was pointless to resume them for just a couple of weeks in late January unless there were no more episodes to be produced. The WGA strike was resolved in February, so Channel 4 had promised viewers the series would return later on in the year with new episodes, but had no idea of when to return them, as the next six months (February–August 2008) was already filled.

3. Channel 4 decided to wait until September after Big Brother 2008 had finished airing, as the episodes took up approximately 100 minutes of airtime on a Friday night, which filled Betty's slot. Prior to Big Brother, March–May was filled with the whole first season of Dirty Sexy Money, which occupied Betty's slot whenever it was not on, and moved accordingly. Betty made its return to Channel 4 on Friday 5 September 2008 between the two season finale episodes of Big Brother. Unlike Desperate Housewives' 3rd-season premiere, Betty's timeslot for that week was not changed as the first show finished at 9pm and resumed with episode 2 at 10pm, meaning that Betty could return to its normal slot. Episodes played straight through into season 3 without a break, and viewers who were desperate to see the next episode of the show could see it one night earlier on a Thursday instead of a Wednesday in its usual 9:00pm slot on E4. T4 then introduced weekend encore sessions on Sundays which replayed that week's episode from 1:30 pm–2:30pm.

== Soundtrack ==
Despite never having a physical or digital release a soundtrack of the series, the following songs were included in the second season of the series.

- "Quicksand Thievery" by Natalie Walker
- "Golden Dreams" by Syd Straw
- "Fire" by Arthur Brown
- "Mile in These Shoes" by Jennifer Lopez
- "Un-Break My Heart" by Toni Braxton
- "Get'cha Head In the Game" by Zac Efron
- "Makin' It" by David Naughton
- "Heart of Glass" by Blondie
- "Sigh" by Crowded House
- "Dirty South Hustla" by Carolina Slim
- "Left in the Dark" by The Leonards
- "As Time Goes By" from the film Casablanca
- "You Can't Have Me" by Clearlake
- "Hot Sahara" by Jimmy Century
- "Fantasy" by Julian Smith
- "Defying Gravity" by Wicked Cast
- "I'm Not That Girl" by Wicked Cast
- "Popular" by Wicked Cast
- "Milkshake" by Amanda Tanen
- "Hallelujah" by Rufus Wainwright
- "Ebony and Ivory" by Paul McCartney and Stevie Wonder
- "You Sexy Thing" by Hot Chocolate
- "Sometimes You Can't Make It On Your Own" by U2
- "I'm in Love with a Girl" by Cynthia Felton
- "Hernando's Hideaway" by From the album 'Tango – Music of Passion'
- "Step It Up" by The Bamboos
- "Eyes Wider Than Before" by Scott Matthews
- "Arky, Arky (Rise and Shine – Noah)" by Anna Laura Page & Jean Anne Shaffeman
- "If You Don't Know Me By Now" by Harold Melvin & the Blue Notes
- "Rise and Shine" by Vanessa Williams
- "Ice Cream Man" by Van Halen
- "Dance Away the Day" by Blanche Dubois
- "Can't Get Tired of Me" by Bow Wow
- "Hey Baby (Jump Off)" by Bow Wow & Omarion
- "Rock and Roll All Nite" by Betty Suarez
- "The Girls" by Calvin Harris
- "Drama Queen" by Switches
- "Gene Simmons Is My Daddy" by Amanda Tanen and I.R.S
- "Shout" by I.R.S
- "Simply Irresistible" by I.R.S
- "It Takes Two" by Betty Suarez and Henry
- "In My Dreams" by Walter Meego
- "Blister of the Spotlight" by Ashtar Command
- "1st Movement String Quintet – Come Try Me" by Savourna Stevenson
- "Never Enough" by Belinda
- "Bounce with Me" by Kreesha Turner
- "No One" by Alicia Keys
- "Calabria" by Enur
- "Didn't You Know (You'd Have to Cry Sometime)" by Gladys Knight & the Pips
- "True" by Spandau Ballet
- "Forever" by Walter Meego
- "In Love with a Friend" by Deep Dish
- "All By Myself" by Eric Carmen
- "Boys Like My Beat" by Joniece
- "All Night" by Joshua Tyler
- "Brighton's Rock" by Shawn Lee's Ping Pong Orchestra
- "Miles Away" by Madonna
- "Jump" by Madonna
- "Candy Shop" by Madonna
- "Spanish Lesson" by Madonna
- "Give It 2 Me" by Madonna
- "She's Not Me" by Madonna

== See also ==
- List of minor characters on Ugly Betty
