= Giving Up the Ghost =

- Ugly Betty episode
- Betty speaks at Bradford's funeral
- Episode no.: Season 2 Episode 9
- Directed by: Gary Winnick
- Written by: Charles Pratt, Jr.
- Production code: 209
- Original air date: November 22, 2007

Episode chronology
← Previous "I See Me, I.C.U."	Next → "Bananas for Betty"
- Ugly Betty season 2

"Giving Up the Ghost" is the ninth episode in the second season, and the 32nd episode overall, of the American dramedy series Ugly Betty, which aired on November 22, 2007. The episode was written by Charles Pratt, Jr. and directed by Gary Winick.

== Plot ==
Days after turning down Daniel's offer to return to work, Betty's subconscious manifests in the form of Bradford Meade's ghost, lecturing her for ignoring what he told her before he died, despite Betty's insistence that she is not ready to return.

At Bradford's funeral, Claire attends on day release from prison. Amanda ponders about whether she would be next in line to take over at the company, but Sheila, who arrived late and hears this exchange, tells her that two years as a receptionist does not qualify. As Betty is delivering a eulogy, Wilhelmina and Marc show up, hoping to make her last remarks. After Wilhelmina comments about Claire's prison uniform, Claire trips Wilhelmina, causing her to fall into Bradford's empty grave. Wilhelmina is fired by unanimous decision of Claire, Daniel, and Alexis.

Fumed by her termination from the company, Wilhelmina returns to her office at MODE to remove her belongings but before she goes, she deploys a computer virus called "Medusa X", which removes all files pertaining to the upcoming issue. When Henry notices the virus in his office, he calls Betty, who is helping the family plan their annual Christmas tree decorations at home, to inform her. As Betty returns to MODE for the night to help resolve the issue, she gives directions to Hilda, Justin and Ignacio on how the tree is normally decorated, although Hilda and Justin think that they should make changes to the tradition. However, the decoration goes awry when Hilda trips on a string of Christmas tree lights, knocking the tree over and setting it on fire.

While Daniel and Betty lead the effort to resurrect the issue with an emergency all-nighter work session, Wilhelmina and Marc interrupt to announce their new magazine, SLATER, and recruit many MODE staff. As Wilhelmina leaves, Marc tempts Amanda to defect, but she turns him down, thus ending their partnership.

In the all-night chaos, Daniel places Sheila in charge and in turn finds replacements to do new articles, with Henry being tasked with writing a food column and Amanda volunteering to write the "Hot or Not" section. Unfortunately Sheila is not happy about having Amanda on the team and Amanda struggles to impress her. When Amanda sees a pizza delivery guy's uniform, she finally comes up with an article, but as she shows off her design, Sheila scraps Amanda's article and condescendingly tells her that she should not try to live up to Fey Sommers' name. At the love dungeon, a distressed Amanda tells Christina that she hopes that when she finds her father, maybe she will know what type of talent that she might actually have.

Alexis takes on the task of getting the printers to extend their hours, but as she goes to the printer's office in an effort to charm him, she discovers that he has left the business to a dwarf-like successor, Harvey Milfree. After the two bicker and bluff all night, they end up discussing how both are "different" and how their fathers treated them. Once the conversation is over, Harvey agrees to keep the presses open, much to Alexis' delight.

The deleted magazine issue also erased the cover spread featuring Cameron Ashlock, a famous actress and singer who has been making a lot of headlines. Daniel and Betty go to break her out of rehab, and after much persuasion, they succeed in convincing her to do a reshoot. Unfortunately, that does not go as well as planned as Cameron goes ballistic on the set and demands alcohol, which Betty thinks is a bad idea. Daniel goes to confront Cameron but cannot bring himself to give her a drink, causing her to lose control and get escorted off the shoot. Unable to reshoot the cover, Daniel opts for a solid black cover in tribute of the late Bradford Meade with an "In Remembrance of Bradford Meade" theme. Betty and the staff are impressed with this cover as a way to honor the late publisher. Betty then tells Daniel that she will return to MODE permanently, and as Daniel walks away, she sees the spirit of Bradford one last time, who bids her farewell.

Later, at Wilhelmina's apartment, she tells the defected MODE staff that she will have the new magazine up and running soon. After they leave, Wilhelmina meets with her father, Senator Slater, to ask for a loan to get her new magazine established. He refuses, saying that the daughter he once knew and loved as Wanda has changed into someone else. After he leaves, Wilhelmina and Marc ponder other options on how to get the financial backing.

Finally, knowing that Christmas is a time for family, Betty buys a pink artificial tree to replace the burned-up one. As they finally decorate the new tree, Ignacio places the angel on top as a remembrance of his late wife.

== Production ==
The episode's original title was "Inherit the Sin", but was changed two weeks after it was announced.

The head of Bradford Meade in Betty's refrigerator was a parody of Friday the 13th Part 2, where Jason puts his mother's head in the fridge before he kills the last survivor, Alice Hardy, from the first film.

This episode officially marked the final appearance for Alan Dale, whose decision to leave the series was entirely his own. "Ugly Betty has changed, because originally it was to be a drama with humour, and in the end it has become an hour-long comedy," notes Dale. "So I won't be with the show for very much longer, because my character doesn't do comedy, really." He went on to add that "They're going to go a different way, so I'll be moving on," Dale said. "But it's a fantastic show, breaking new ground, really. We'll see what happens next pilot season, but I'm surprised there aren't a lot more comedies just imitating it."

The song played at the end of the episode is the Spanish Christmas song "Feliz Navidad", which means "Merry Christmas".

Wendy Benson, who played Veronica in this episode, makes her first recurring appearance in the series. Her next one will be in "Zero Worship".

== Reception ==
The episode received excellent praise, especially among the cast and performances. TV Guide cited Judith Light's Claire role in the funeral scene as her best yet, while Entertainment Weekly's Tanner Stransky cited it as one of the ten reasons for being thankful about this episode.

== Ratings ==
The episode pulled in more than 7.49 million viewers in the United States, but came in 50th in the Nielsen ratings, the lowest so far this season. 2.7 million viewers watched this episode in the UK, with a 9% audience share, ranking fifth place in its timeslot.

== Other notes ==
After Wilhelmina launches Slater, Alexis covers her eyes, Betty covers her mouth, and Daniel covers his ears, symbolising three wise monkeys.

== Also starring ==
- Max Greenfield as Nick Pepper
- Illeana Douglas as Sheila

== Guest stars ==
- Eliza Dushku as Cameron Ashlock
- Ron Canada as Senator Slater
- David J. Steinberg as Harvey Milfree
- Wendy Benson as Veronica
- Greg Wilson as Pizza Delivery Guy
