= Odor in the Court =

- Ugly Betty episode
- Episode no.: Season 2 Episode 12
- Directed by: Victor Nelli, Jr.
- Written by: Bill Wrubel
- Production code: 212
- Original air date: January 17, 2008

Episode chronology
← Previous "Zero Worship"	Next → "A Thousand Words Before Friday"
- Ugly Betty season 2

"Odor in the Court" is the 12th episode in the second season, and the 35th episode overall, of the American dramedy series Ugly Betty, which aired on January 17, 2008. The episode was written by Bill Wrubel and directed by Victor Nelli, Jr.

== Plot ==
The story begins at Gio's deli, where a disoriented Betty wakes up on the floor among broken glasses and in handcuffs. She doesn't remember how this all started, and as Gio observes her state of confusion, he tells the police officer who arrested her that he doesn't plan to press charges. Then, through the magic of rewinding, the screen reads Three days earlier...

At the long-awaited trial of the State vs. Claire Meade, Alexis and Daniel try to bond together as they hope that their mother will get a fair trial while at the same time try to keep each other in check, right down to the attire that they will wear. Betty assures the two that the case will go smoothly. As they go visit Claire, she assures her children that everything will be alright as she already entered her plea of not guilty by reason of insanity. She also gives Betty her favorite perfume that Bradford gave to her as a gift, since perfume is not allowed at prison. Betty accepts.

Unfortunately, while this is happening at the same time, Amanda discovers that everyone has found the Love Dungeon. Stunned by having other workers walk in on her secret hideaway, Amanda walks out in disgust and takes the canvas of Fey with her. As she returns to her desk, Amanda discovers several missing pages of Fey's diary that was taped to the canvas. As she reads it, Amanda learns that Fey had written about giving Bradford a gift after he returned from Scandinavia, that he would later give to Claire. The gift was the same perfume that Claire just gave to Betty. But as Amanda reads further, she learns that this is no ordinary perfume: Fey had added several poisonous ingredients to it that causes people to act strangely and violently, among other things. While Amanda reads her late mother's sinister plotting, Betty, who brings the perfume back to work with her, can't resist the scent and starts spraying it on her as the toxins start to inhabit her body.

Over at Wilhelmina's, Christina is asked why Wilhelmina would see her and when the word of being a surrogate for her baby came up, Christina turned her down ("My uterus is officially closed to Devil's spawn!"), leaving Wilhelmina to come up with a scheme to ensure Christina's loyalty.

Back in the courtroom, Alexis is on the witness stand testifying that she loved her mother but is crossed-examined by the prosecutor over why Alexis faked her death just to have a sex change operation, which would later be shot down by the judge because Alexis' "personal issues" has nothing to do with the case. Alexis and Daniel are relieved that the trial is going smoothly because of the judge's sympathy, but as they wait in line to get coffee, a barista yells to see if anyone can break a 20 dollar bill, and Daniel walks up to the front of the line to discover that the person who wanted the change was the judge, resulting in unwanted press and the judge excusing herself from the trial. As they returned to the courtroom, Claire and her lawyer are shocked that the new judge that was brought in won't be as sympathetic as the one who was removed.

Back at MODE, Betty begins to act strangely as she starts typing faster than ever and becomes more hyperactive. As Henry comes by to say goodbye before he takes off to Arizona to see Charlie, Betty starts to go crazy by cozying up to him in a horny situation that has Henry freaked out! The erratic behavior would continue as Gio stops by to drop off sandwiches to her. Betty tells Gio that one of them was for Henry's care package, but then she starts acting more weirder around Gio to the point that she passionately hugs him, which seems to please Gio. As Henry exits for the elevator Betty, who has started using more of the perfume, starts babbling nonsense about whether he should cheat on her but doesn't care, only to have Henry assuring her that he won't and she runs to the elevator and jumps all over him and after getting herself off him reminds Henry to call her. As Henry leaves, Betty starts noticing all those fancy designs and as she runs into Christina she get cozy around her as well.

At the Love Dungeon, Amanda tells Marc about the letters. As Marc reads it he tells Amanda that this could be key to getting Claire released, but Amanda won't let that happen because Claire killed her mother, so she forces Marc to burn the letters as she chases Halston, who is upset over Amanda's request.

As Christina returns to The Closet, she shows off a dress, which once belonged to Jacqueline Kennedy Onassis, to Betty that she plans to sell in order get the needed money for Stuart's operation. Unfortunately, Marc gets wind of this as he and Wilhelmina sneak in and destroy it. Upon learning what they did after she tried to sell it, Christina is left with no choice but give in to Wilhelmina's scheming request.

The next day at the Suarezes, the family are wondering what has happened to Betty. Even Ignacio is shocked over Betty turning down his eggs, opting instead for whipped cream that she takes out of the fridge. As she leaves Justin starts to like the sassiness in his aunt. During the entire day Betty becomes more addicted to the perfume, even as she starts staring at her cell phone waiting for Henry to call. As Gio stops by to see her, the conversation and behavior (sharpening every pencil on her desk being one of them) starts to get weirder as Betty criticizes Gio about he really feels about Henry and orders him to leave. At this point the perfume has become Betty's drug of choice and as Amanda stops by to ask for cash, Betty slams it in front of her, then notices the perfume after Betty tells her that Claire gave it to her. Later that evening Betty starts acting more delusional by walking toward Gio's deli, taking a trashcan and throwing it at the shop's window.

The following day Betty is bought in for an examination and learns from her doctor that she has drugged-induced toxins in her body, but Betty claims that she is not on drugs and as the entire Suarez family rushes down to the hospital, Betty assures that she is fine and when the doctor mentions the toxin's effects, Betty realizes that the source of the toxins came from the perfume and that Claire was innocent all along. But as she races back to MODE to retrieve it, she learns that Amanda has taken it. Amanda reluctantly gives her the perfume but when Betty takes it to the courthouse so she could testify, the prosecutor tells her that the perfume is water. It appears that Amanda replaced the perfume, but as she tried to get Marc to help her destroy the evidence, Marc told her he couldn't because the person who made all this responsible in the first place all along was Fey Sommers herself. Then he showed her the pages that he kept hidden in his jacket saying that he couldn't burn them. As Amanda slaps Marc, she realizes that he is right, so she heads down to the courthouse and gives Betty the evidence that would result in Claire being found not guilty by reason of temporary insanity. As the Meades celebrate their union, Daniel, Alexis and Claire thank Betty for coming through. She also apologizes to Gio and thanked with a hug, which Gio seemed to be pleased with.

At the gynecologist's office Wilhelmina and Marc watch Christina get injected with Bradford's sperm, when all of a sudden Betty barges in. It turns out that Betty has agreed to help Christina with carrying the baby to full term whether Wilhelmina likes it or not. As the gynecologist injects the egg it starts dividing into unimaginable amounts.

== Production ==
"Odor in the Court" marked the end of one of the show's most on-again/off-again storylines: Who killed Fey Sommers, and with that Claire's career as a criminal. While that one may have run its course, the question of other storylines featured in this episode, including Wilhelmina's "planned" pregnancy, the Betty/Henry/Gio triangle, Amanda's search for her father among them, are still up in the air. In an interview with USA Today, producer Silvio Horta notes that "The strike basically killed everything." "We're still going to do it, and we hope it's this year. But the reality is, we don't know what's left of the season. We're in limbo."

For actress Judith Light, being in courtrooms is nothing new, for this is the third time in her television career in which her characters found themselves on opposite sides of the law on a TV series, her first being on One Life to Live where she played Karen Wolek, whose role spawned one of the show's most-remembered storylines in which her character became a prostitute after she became bored with her life as a housewife. On trial, Karen saved her friend Victoria Lord from being convicted of killing her pimp by admitting that she had been a prostitute to the entire town, including her faithful husband, who would later divorce her. The second time around, Light became a recurring regular on NBC's Law & Order: Special Victims Unit, where she plays Judge Elizabeth Donnelly, who served as a Bureau Chief ADA in the Manhattan District Attorney's office before being appointed to the bench in Season 7. Light was at the time a recurring regular on that series when "Betty" was still filming and after its ending continues in that role.

A pair of fellow shows produced by ABC Studios got referenced in this episode, as Hilda and Justin mentioned Grey's Anatomy and Private Practice respectively.

As for the perfume, the Los Angeles Times did an article about whether a fragrance like the one described in this episode can actually be dangerous

This is the second episode, after "Sofia's Choice", to start at the climax of the episode and then flash back to what happened earlier.

== Reception ==
According to Entertainment Weekly's Tanner Stransky, it's a relief that the Fey storyline is over and done with: "That axiom about the truth setting you free? It proved to be right for Claire Meade last night on Ugly Betty. And more important, that truth finally cleared up what exactly happened with Fey Sommers' death, a story line that the show has been following — sometimes for the better, sometimes for the worse — since its launch a year and a half ago. I don't know what you thought of the final revelations, TV watchers, but I'm totally fulfilled by the sensational wrap-up to the Fey-Bradford-Claire love triangle."

== Ratings ==
The episode scored a 6.4/10, placing second behind Are You Smarter Than a 5th Grader?, who scored its highest numbers and gave Fox its first-ever Thursday night win over Ugly Betty.

== Also starring ==
- Freddy Rodriguez as Giovanni "Gio" Rossi
- Alec Mapa as Suzuki St. Pierre

== Guest stars ==
- Anne Bellamy as Judge Heller
- Caroline Aaron as Judge Biotch
- Paul McCrane as District Attorney Weitz
- Barry Bostwick as Roger Adams
- Louis Giambalvo as Dr. Squazzi
