= Jump (Ugly Betty) =

- Ugly Betty episode
- Episode no.: Season 2 Episode 18
- Directed by: Victor Nelli, Jr.
- Written by: Silvio Horta
- Production code: 218
- Original air date: May 22, 2008

Episode chronology
← Previous "The Kids Are Alright"	Next → "The Manhattan Project"
- Ugly Betty season 2

"Jump" is the 18th episode in the second season, the 41st episode overall, and the second-season finale of the American dramedy series Ugly Betty, which aired on May 22, 2008. The episode was written by Silvio Horta and directed by Victor Nelli, Jr.

== Plot ==
In a flashback to high school in 1999, popular mean girl Kimmie Keegan (Lindsay Lohan) picks Betty for her team in a game of dodgeball, only to order the teammates to use Betty as a human shield. In the present day, Betty tells Gio that she will not participate in the charity softball game for Mode vs. Elle magazine because of her high school experiences. Gio attempts to convince Betty to join but she is distracted when she sees her first article published in Hot Flash. Betty is disappointed to see that her story has been severely edited but Claire tells Betty that she needs to go beyond the "safe" approach. During lunch, Gio convinces Betty to practice softball and invites her to join him on a romantic trip to Rome as he searches for food inspiration. Betty accepts, but then Henry visits Betty with a proposal of his own: he asks her to marry him and join him in Tucson, where he has lined up an editorial position for her at a local magazine. Ignacio is against both proposals and visits Betty at Mode to show Betty her a series of family photos. He then tells her that she should make her own decisions by looking inside her own heart.

Meanwhile, Hilda's burgeoning romance with Tony is halted when she discovers he is married. He tells her that he is unhappy with his marriage and Hilda agrees to keep dating him.

A French orphaned boy arrives at Mode and introduces himself as Daniel Jr., Daniel's son from a former fling with a French model. Daniel believes this is a scam concocted by Wilhelmina, who truthfully denies it, but later plots to use Daniel Jr. to sabotage Daniel's ad campaign for a Dutch cosmetics mogul. Wilhelmina and Marc befriend Daniel Jr. and leak the news to Fashion TV, humiliating Daniel and putting the Dutch ad campaign in jeopardy. Claire and Alexis convince Daniel to make amends with his son and he agrees to assume custody until a paternity test is completed. Wilhelmina advises Alexis that with this major life change, Daniel would benefit from stepping down at Mode. Alexis agrees and plans to reassign Daniel to another position at the company, much to Claire's dismay.

At the Mode vs. Elle magazine game, Betty is surprised to see both Henry and Gio playing. Both men attempt to ask her if she will accept their respective proposals. Daniel confronts Wilhelmina about using Daniel Jr. to make him look bad, and Wilhelmina informs him that she is now the new editor-in-chief at Mode. Daniel angrily blasts Alexis for betraying him and leaves the game with Daniel Jr. Wilhelmina then takes his place as the pitcher, and she strikes out both Joe Zee and Roberta Myers from Elle. Elle's star player, supermodel Naomi Campbell, hits the ball in the direction of, Betty, Henry and Gio. All three go for the ball and Betty is knocked unconscious. She dreams about what life would be like if she chose to accompany Gio in Rome and then switches to fantasizing about being married to Henry in Tucson. Her dream becomes a nightmare when Gio and Henry interrupt each other and order Betty to choose between them. When Betty wakes up, she discovers that she helped Mode win the game. Betty also realizes she is ready to make a decision. In the final scene, Daniel cleans out his office at Mode while Betty packs her bags and leaves her house for an unknown destination.

== Production ==
"Jump" is the last episode of the series to be produced in Los Angeles. Starting in season three, the series would be produced in New York City.

The year "1999" was added to the Ugly Betty opening titles in this episode.

== Casting ==
This episode marked the last for Rebecca Romijn as a series regular. Starting in season 3, she would return as a recurring character.

Ashley Jensen (Christina McKinney) was not featured in this episode.

This episode introduced two new recurring regulars, whose storylines in this season finale continues in the third season: Lindsay Lohan as Kimberly in the first of four episode arc, and Julian de la Celle as Daniel Jr.

Lohan decided not to submit herself for consideration in the category for Outstanding Guest Actress in a Comedy Series at the 2008 Emmy Awards due to her limited screen time in this episode.

== Music notes ==
The episode contained a variety of songs from Madonna's album Hard Candy: "Candy Shop", "Spanish Lesson", "She's Not Me" and "Miles Away". The song "Jump" from her Confessions on a Dance Floor album was also featured in the episode.

== Reception ==
In an Entertainment Weekly review, Tanner Stransky wrote of the second-season finale: "I think the producers were right to get back to the heart of the show — it melts me every time. Last season's finale was action-packed, and this one was sentiment-packed — with a few cliff-hangers thrown in for good measure. A nice balance, if I do say so myself."

This episode generated mixed feelings among viewers and critics. Negative feedback from viewers appeared on websites such as LiveJournal's Ugly Betty blog.

TV Guide gave both Lohan and Campbell "Jeers" for their performances.

== Ratings ==
"Jump" was another episode that saw a ratings increase in the United States over the previous episode. While it pulled in a 6.2/11 overall with more than 8.8 million viewers tuning in and placing a 2.8/9 among 18-49 demos, it was second behind NBC's Deal or No Deal but helped ABC win the Thursday Night battle in the May 2008 sweeps. By contrast the first-season finale had 10.39 million viewers, but viewership for this finale were off by 1.59 million viewers and like the first-season finale it too was beaten by a TV special. However, the episode also returned Ugly Betty back to the Nielsen top 20 that week, where it ranked 17th.

== Also starring ==
- Freddy Rodriguez as Gio Rossi
- Eddie Cibrian as Coach Diaz
- Julian de la Celle as Daniel Jr.
- Alec Mapa as Suzuki St. Pierre

== Guest starring ==
- Naomi Campbell as herself
- Joe Zee as himself
- Robbie Myers as herself
- Nathanaël Maïni as Mode employee/translator
- Torill as Madelon de Bie
- Edward Stanley as Doctor
- Samantha Frank as Mona
- Lindsay Lohan as Kimmie Keegan (uncredited)
