= David J. Steinberg =

American actor

David Steinberg
- Born: David Joseph Steinberg; February 12, 1965; Los Angeles, California, U.S.
- Died: March 16, 2010 (aged 45); Valencia, California, U.S.
- Resting place: Forest Lawn Memorial Gardens, Plantation, Florida, U.S.
- Education: Messiah College
- Occupation: Actor
- Years active: 1987–2009

David Joseph Steinberg (February 12, 1965 – March 16, 2010) was an American actor best known for his role of Meegosh in the 1988 Ron Howard film Willow.

== Early life ==
Steinberg was born in Los Angeles and stood 3 ft 1 in (0.94 m) tall. His adoptive parents also had dwarfism. Steinberg was raised in Queens, New York, where he excelled in comedy in school as a way to overcome shyness over his short stature.

== Career ==
He first began acting on stage while studying at Messiah College in Pennsylvania. He switched to professional theater after college. His theater credits included performances with notable theater companies including the Guthrie Theater in Minneapolis, the Center Stage in Baltimore and the New York Shakespeare Festival. He also starred in a Grammy-nominated national touring production of The Wizard of Oz (as a Munchkin) and Baz Luhrmann's production of La bohème in Los Angeles and New York City.

While Steinberg was best known as Meegosh in Willow, his other film credits included roles in The Hebrew Hammer and Love & Sex. His television appearances included a guest spot on the 2007 Ugly Betty episode, Giving Up the Ghost, as well as roles on Zoey 101, Charmed, The Equalizer, Are You Afraid of the Dark? and The Days and Nights of Molly Dodd.

== Personal life ==
Steinberg moved to Los Angeles in 2004.

== Death ==
He died by suicide on March 16, 2010, in Valencia, California, aged 45. The Los Angeles County Coroner determined Steinberg's death as hanging. His interment was at Forest Lawn Memorial Gardens in Plantation, Florida.

== Filmography ==
David J. Steinberg film and television credits
Year	Title	Role	Notes
1987	The Equalizer	Freddy	Episode: "In the Money"
1988	Willow	Meegosh	Film
1992	Are You Afraid of the Dark?	Sean O'Shaney	Episode: "The Tale of Jake and the Leprechaun"
2000	Love & Sex	Tiny Man	Film
2003	The Hebrew Hammer	Elf Flunky	Film
2004	Charmed	Riley	1 episode
2006	Fur	Singing Little Person	Film
2007	Epic Movie	Oompa Loompa	Film
2007	SpongeBob's Atlantis SquarePantis	SpongeBob hallucination (uncredited)	1 episode
2008	Agent One-Half	Widget	Film
2009	Transylmania	Dean Floca	Film (final role)
