= The Kids Are Alright (Ugly Betty) =

- Ugly Betty episode
- Episode no.: Season 2 Episode 17
- Directed by: Wendey Stanzler
- Written by: Brian Tanen
- Production code: 217
- Original air date: May 15, 2008

Episode chronology
| ← Previous "Betty's Baby Bump" | Next → "Jump" |
- Ugly Betty season 2

"The Kids Are Alright" is the 17th episode in the second season, and the 40th episode overall, of the American dramedy series Ugly Betty, which aired on May 15, 2008. The episode was written by Brian Tanen and directed by Wendey Stanzler.

== Plot ==
Betty, still missing Henry, fights her attraction to Gio, but later finds herself stuck with him when both volunteer to chaperone Justin's middle school dance. Meanwhile, Hilda tries to get Coach Diaz (guest star Eddie Cibrian) to notice her; Amanda agrees to do a reality show with her dad, KISS rock legend Gene Simmons; and Daniel feels the heat when Wilhelmina makes her triumphant return to Mode amid a media frenzy.

== Reception ==
The episode was praised by reviewers, who were impressed by the mixing of romantic formulas and the return of dramedic elements that worked for the series during the first season. Quotes Entertainment Weekly's Tanner Stransky: "I always thought of the show as much more of a fish-out-of-water dramedy, focused on the pratfalls of a good-hearted but awkward girl. Although it's still that, last night's episode — with the love connections sparking between Gio and Betty, Hilda and Tony, and, yes, even Marc and Amanda — was so romance-tastic."

TV Guide added in its review of this story: "All in all, I thought it was a pretty good episode."

== Ratings ==
After spending most of the second season in second place, this episode would be the only one in the series to win its timeslot this season with 8.5 million viewers in the United States tuning in and scoring a 5.9/10 share overall, along with a 2.7/8 share among 18-49 demographics.

== Also starring ==
- Freddy Rodriguez as Giovanni "Gio" Rossi
- Eddie Cibrian as Coach Diaz
- Alec Mapa as Suzuki St. Pierre
- Jasmine Anthony as Antonella

== Guest starring ==
- Gene Simmons as himself
- Larry King as himself

== Co-starring ==
- Bernard K. Addison as Principal Hayward
- Elijah de Jesus as Little Betty
- Giancarlo Rodriguez as Little Gio
- Cody Klôp as Little Daniel
- MaCall Manor as Little Amanda
