= Zero Worship (Ugly Betty) =

- Ugly Betty episode
- Episode no.: Season 2 Episode 11
- Directed by: Ron Underwood
- Written by: Dawn DeKeyser
- Production code: 211
- Original air date: January 10, 2008

Episode chronology
← Previous "Bananas for Betty"	Next → "Odor in the Court"
- Ugly Betty season 2

"Zero Worship" is the 11th episode in the second season, and the 34th episode overall, of the American dramedy series Ugly Betty, which aired on January 10, 2008. The episode was written by Dawn DeKeyser and directed by Ron Underwood.

== Plot ==
Amanda turns to a psychic in her quest to find her birth father; Betty wants Daniel to use models of all shapes and sizes at Fashion Week after Justin's friends get a different impression on their class tour of Mode, but Alexis proves an obstacle due to her domineering ways. Meanwhile, Wilhelmina is hormonal and trying to find someone to be a surrogate mother for her baby.

== Production ==
This episode was supposed to make its airing debut on January 3, 2008, but last minute schedule changes pushed its airing back a week.

== Reception ==
In TV Guide's "Ask Matt" column, Matt Roush touted this episode as one of his favorites.

== Ratings ==
The episode would go on to win its timeslot with a 6.7/11 share and more than 10 million viewers tuning in. However, in the January 7th-13th 2008 Nielsen weekly ratings it came in 27th, with Fox's Are You Smarter Than a 5th Grader?, which aired opposite Betty, edging the episode out by nearly 100,000 viewers.

== Also starring ==
- Alec Mapa as Suzuki St. Pierre
- Wendy Benson as Veronica
- Juliette Goglia as Hilary
- Derek Riddell as Stuart McKinney

== Guest stars ==
- Annie Potts as Linda,
- Rob Brownstein as Dr. Weiss
- Omarion as himself
- Bow Wow as himself
- Elizabeth McLaughlin as Lindsay
- Hannah Marks as Taylor
- Carol Ann Susi as Mrs. Galeano
- Jennifer Norkin as Brandy
- Jonathan Kehoe as "Player" Editor
- Robyn Moran as "Cucina" Editor
- Ashley Estrella as 12-year-old Betty
