= How Betty Got Her Grieve Back =

- Ugly Betty episode
- Amanda hands Marc a candy wrapper as she sits on her parents couch.
- Episode no.: Season 2 Episode 1
- Directed by: James Hayman
- Written by: Silvio Horta & Marco Pennette
- Production code: 201
- Original air date: September 27, 2007

Episode chronology
| ← Previous "East Side Story" | Next → "Family/Affair" |
- Ugly Betty season 2

"How Betty Got Her Grieve Back" is the season two premiere of dramedy series Ugly Betty. It aired on September 27, 2007. It is the 24th episode in the series, which was written by Silvio Horta & Marco Pennette and directed by James Hayman. The episode's title is a play on the book and film How Stella Got Her Groove Back.

== Plot ==
Three weeks after the events of the season finale, Betty's life is in chaos. Not only does she find herself constantly stressing about Henry and Charlie, but she also receives a bruised eye after bumping into a MODE glass cover. As a result, she requires an eye-patch.

Things have also been hard on Daniel and Alexis after the car crash. He constantly tries to keep the paparazzi from photographing the comatose Alexis. He also notices Betty trying to deal with her problems over losing Henry and suggests that they meet in Central Park. While there, Daniel tells her to bury all the things that symbolize her feelings for Henry. As she does, Daniel decides to "bury" his drug addiction, because it contributed to the car crash. He later returns to the hospital and sees Alexis coming out of her coma. She now appears to have suffered memory loss and still believes herself to be Alex.

It has also been difficult for Ignacio as well. Betty calls to tell him the lawyer is doing his best to help him return to the United States.

Meanwhile, Amanda turns to Marc in dealing with the revelation that Fey Sommers was her real mother. He suggests that they pay a visit to Scarsdale, as they try to get the real answer about how close her parents were to the late editor. When they arrive, Amanda is shocked to see her "parents" in their pajamas in the daytime and having "company" another couple. It turns out that the Tanens are swingers. Before Amanda decides to give up, Marc tells them that Amanda knows about Fey being her mother. The Tanens tell Amanda that she was adopted because Fey did not want to damage her career and felt that Amanda would have a better life with another family, plus the Tanens could not have children. Amanda and Marc then decide to look for Amanda's father. As they arrive back to the Meade Building, the two are joined in the elevator by Bradford, and as Marc suspects that Bradford could be Amanda's father. Marc tells Amanda that the only way to get proof is through DNA. After two failed attempts, Marc successfully gets a sample of Bradford's ear hair and later hands the evidence to Amanda.

Wilhelmina takes advantage of being temporary editor-in-chief by scrapping Daniel's approved spread in favor of a Victoria's Secret spread, with help from assistant editor Sheila, who loves Victoria's Secret. Later that day, Justin sneaks in to the 28th floor and sees Wilhelmina having a nervous breakdown. After she overhears Justin telling a model to lose the belt, and quotes Coco Chanel, "When accessorizing, always take off the last thing you put on". Wilhelmina spots him and likes his idea. Justin would later learn from Betty that MODE has offered him an internship, thanks to Daniel.

As Wilhelmina plots to turn the tragic Meade family events to her advantage, Claire and Yoga prepare to make their hideaway plans as Claire tries to stop the wedding plans. While hiding, Claire tells Yoga that she needs to find Bradford. Claire calls Wilhelmina and tells her that she will sell MODE to her by meeting at Central Park. Their plans to double-cross each other take a surprising turn: At Central Park, it is Marc who shows up in Wilhelmina's dress...but he gets beaten up by Yoga in the nun's outfit. While at Bradford's office, Claire is shocked to see Wilhelmina there. Wilhelmina tells her the police will be arriving in three minutes. Claire punched her and said she'll be gone in one.

Finally, Hilda and Santos are spending their day in bed, talking about their wedding plans and their future together as a couple. Hilda refuses to let him leave, for his own safety. They set another date for their wedding. Hilda tries on her wedding dress for Santos and asks him to read his wedding vows. Santos reads a letter saying that he will always love Hilda. He was sorry it took him many years. When Santos tells Hilda that it was time for him to leave, Hilda cries and mentions that he needs to heal from his gunshot wound. Betty opens the door to ask Hilda if she would like to join them for dinner as Hilda is alone in her bathrobe, holding a pillow and staring at the bathroom door with the light on; after three weeks she admits that Santos died in the robbery. Betty comforts her.

Later that night a bus stops to drop off Henry.

== Casting ==
There were changes in the show's starring lineup with this episode. Judith Light, who plays Claire Meade, and Christopher Gorham who plays Henry Grubstick, became series regulars after being recurring in the first season. In addition, this episode introduced the recurring characters of Sheila, played by Illeana Douglas and reporter Suzuki St. Pierre, played by Alec Mapa. Kevin Alejandro's Santos, who was a recurring character in the first season, would make his final appearance in this episode.

== Reception ==
The episode received positive remarks from critics and fans. In a review from Entertainment Weekly, writer Tanner Stransky notes "My biggest concern going into last night? That this episode would go the way of so many sophomore-season premieres – the way of we got too big for our britches, i.e., we got cocky and tried to one-up ourselves but fell flat on our faces. I'm all about one-upping, but in the case of Betty, why change something that was working so delightfully well? I'm happy to report that the show didn't go off the rails. I was impressed: From Amanda's sudden weight gain (genius!) to Justin scoring an internship (as the correspondent from Fashion TV would say, ah-maaaz-ing!), the whole thing felt very core Betty."

== Ratings ==
The episode scored a 7.4 rating and placed 28th in the September 24–30, 2007 Nielsen ratings, down from its 16.9 debut in 2006. It pulled in 11.16 million viewers, an improvement from the first-season finale, but was off by 5 million from the debut episode. This episode held 6.4 million viewers when it aired on Channel 4 in the United Kingdom on October 5, 2007.

== Also starring ==
- Kevin Alejandro – Santos
- Jayma Mays – Charlie
- Lorraine Toussaint – Yoga

== Guest stars ==
- Kurt Fuller – Mr. Tanen
- Stephanie Faracy – Rosemary Tanen
- Matt Riedy – Mr. Klein
- Kat Sawyer – Mrs. Klein
- Alec Mapa – Suzuki St. Pierre

== Notes ==
Victoria's Secret got promotional consideration credits in this episode, as most of the scenes featured the company's line of products and the use of its "What Is Sexy?" trademarked tagline.
