= The Greg Wilson =

American actor

Greg Wilson
- Born: Gregory Romero Wilson; Dallas, Texas, U.S.
- Notable work: The Hottie and the Nottie, World's Dumbest...

Comedy career
- Years active: 1996–present
- Medium: Stand-up, film, television
- Genres: Observational comedy, Improvisational comedy, sketch comedy,
- Website: http://thegregwilson.com/

Gregory Romero "Greg" Wilson, (born November 12), better known by the stage name The Greg Wilson, is an American stand-up comedian and actor, based in Los Angeles. He is best known for his role as Arno Blount in the 2008 movie The Hottie and the Nottie.

== Career ==
Greg Wilson got his start in comedy when Phil Larsson heard of him, and added him as a member of the Dallas improv theater group Ad-Libs. He went on to develop his own shows: The Comedy Madhouse in Las Vegas and later The Greg Wilson's Stand-Up|Smackdown! in New York City.

Currently based in Los Angeles, Wilson has performed in venues such as The Laugh Factory and Stand Up NY. On television, he has made appearances in several comedy shows and specials, including Showtime's White Boyz in the Hood, Comics Unleashed, and Comedy.tv, and was featured in an episode of the reality show Who Wants to Date a Comedian?. From 2012 to 2013, he was a cast member on World's Dumbest.... He also co-hosts the podcast Hot N' Heavy, along with model Angie Everhart.

Wilson runs a stand-up comedy academy, The Comedy Institute. In it, he offers courses on storytelling, handling hecklers, and other skills necessary for a stand-up comedian, as well as a master class on "Mastering Stand-Up".

As an actor, Wilson has appeared in television series such as Bones, Ugly Betty, and Modern Family, usually in small, episodic roles, as well as commercials for Heineken and Toyota, among other brands. In 2008, Wilson landed a starring role in the romantic comedy film The Hottie and the Nottie, opposite Paris Hilton and Joel David Moore. He portrayed Arno Blount, the male lead's quirky childhood friend. The film was a box office bomb and received universally negative reviews, and has been cited as one of the worst films ever made.

Notable voice acting roles include the character JD O'Toole in the video game Grand Theft Auto: Liberty City Stories and the eponymous Mr. Two in the animated Nickelodeon pilot Charlie and Mr. Two.

== Controversy ==
On April 26, 2013, /Film writer Peter Sciretta claimed Wilson had been publicly accused of joke theft during a taping of America's Got Talent. Allegedly, Wilson auditioned for the talent show with a comedy act involving a mimed reenactment of an argument between a married couple. During the subsequent evaluation by the show's jury, judge Howie Mandel mentioned having previously witnessed a strikingly similar act being performed by comedian Frank Nicotero, who had been hired as a warm-up comedian for the program and was present during the taping. Wilson denied having stolen the material. Although the judges decided to advance Wilson to the next round nonetheless, he was later disqualified and the footage was never aired. Both Nicotero and Wilson later confirmed Sciretta's account of the events.

== Filmography ==
=== Film ===
Year	Title	Role	Notes
1996	Cyberstalker	Slick	
1998	Yello Dyno: Tricky People	Yello Dyno/Wendell	
2001	The Process of Creative Deception	Sheldon Smith	Leading role
2008	The Hottie and the Nottie	Arno Blount	Leading role
2009	Endless Bummer	Animal	Actor and writer
2010	Back Nine	Youth Group Leader	Television movie
2016	Hidden in the Heart of Texas: The Official Hide and Go Seek Documentary	The Bellhop	Post-production
2017	Larry Leap Year	Easter Bunny	

=== Television ===
Year	Title	Role	Notes
2006	White Boyz in the Hood	Himself	1 episode
2006	Studio 60 on the Sunset Strip	Improv MC	Episode: "The Wrap Party"
2006–2015	Comics Unleashed	Himself	3 episodes
2007	Trading Spaces	Himself	5 episodes
2007	Life	Lee	Episode: "Let Her Go"
2007	Ugly Betty	Pizza Delivery Guy	Episode: "Giving Up the Ghost"
2009	Bones	Tumbles	Episode: "Double Trouble in the Panhandle"
2009	Comedy.tv	Himself	1 episode
2009	Modern Family	Head Elf	Episode: "Undeck the Halls"
2011	Who Wants to Date a Comedian?	Himself	1 episode
2012	Undercovers	Serge	Episode: "Dark Cover"
2012	Mr. Box Office	Director	Episode: "Somebody's Watching Me"
2012–2013	World's Dumbest...	Himself	7 episodes
2013	Kickin' It	Bert	Episode: "Jack Stands Alone"
2013	Charlie and Mr. Two	Mr. Two	Voice. TV pilot.
2014	The Mindy Project	Vic Defruzzio	Episode: "Caramel Princess Time"
2014	Hawaii Five-0	Tree Lot Owner	Episode: "Ke Koho Mamao Aku"
2015	Marry Me	Lester	Episode: "Change Me"
2015	The Odd Couple	Manager	Episode: "The Ghostwriter"
2015	Fresh Off the Boat	Janitor	Episode: "Very Superstitious"
2017	Powerless	Peter the Janitor	2 episodes
2018	Electives	Shannon	Episode: "Pilot"
2018	Ghosted	Davey	6 episodes
2018	School of Rock	Erika's Dad	Episode: "Not Afraid"
2020	Upload	Louie Cruz	1 episode
2020	United We Fall	Benicio Rodriguez	2 episodes

=== Video games ===
Year	Title	Role
2002	Grand Theft Auto: Vice City	Imager
2005	The Warriors	Vargas
2005	Grand Theft Auto: Liberty City Stories	Joseph Daniel 'J.D' O'Toole

== Discography ==
- Pottymouth (2007)
- Hollywood Legend & Sex Symbol (2010)

== Bibliography ==
- Wilson, Greg. The Complete Guide to Stand-up: Everything you need to know, from open-mics to going pro! , ISBN 9780692341315, Gregory D. Wilson / The Comedy Institute 2014.
