= List of Ugly Betty characters =

This article lists the characters featured in the American ABC comedy-drama series Ugly Betty.

== Overview ==
Actor	Character	Seasons			
Actor	Character	1	2	3	4
America Ferrera	Betty Suarez	Main	Main	Main	Main
Eric Mabius	Daniel Meade	Main	Main	Main	Main
Alan Dale	Bradford Meade	Main (Note: In the second season, Alan Dale is only credited as a main cast member through episode 10.)	Main		
Tony Plana	Ignacio Suarez	Main	Main	Main	Main
Ana Ortiz	Hilda Suarez	Main	Main	Main	Main
Ashley Jensen	Christina McKinney	Main	Main	Main	Guest
Becki Newton	Amanda Tanen	Main	Main	Main	Main
Mark Indelicato	Justin Suarez	Main	Main	Main	Main
Vanessa Williams	Wilhelmina Slater	Main	Main	Main	Main
Rebecca Romijn	Alexis Meade	Main (Note: In the first season, Rebecca Romijn is introduced as a main cast member beginning with episode 13.)	Main	Recurring	
Michael Urie	Marc St. James	Main (Note: In the first season, Michael Urie and Kevin Sussman are credited as guest stars in episodes 1 through 13 and billed as main cast from episode 14 onwards.)	Main	Main	Main
Kevin Sussman	Walter	Main			
Christopher Gorham	Henry Grubstick	Recurring	Main	Guest	Guest
Judith Light	Claire Meade	Recurring	Main	Main	Main
Daniel Eric Gold	Matt Hartley			Recurring	Main (Note: In the fourth season, Daniel Eric Gold is only credited as a main cast member through episode 11.)

== Main characters ==
=== Betty Suarez ===
Betty Suarez, played by America Ferrera, is the main protagonist. Aims to run her own magazine in the future. She initially did not know the true circumstances that led to her hiring (annoyed by Daniel's womanizing, Bradford Meade hired Betty to be his son's assistant knowing that Daniel would find her unattractive and get him to take his job seriously), but stayed on as Daniel's assistant as they forged an unlikely friendship. Soon Betty became one of Daniel's most trusted friends, constantly keeping him out of trouble, jail, and even once saving his life when his girlfriend, Reneé, proved to be a sociopath. She was also most supportive of him whenever he was battling against Wilhelmina, his father Bradford, his trans sister Alexis, or untrue accusations. Betty was at first discriminated against by most of her colleagues due to her lack of fashion sense, but as she proved to be kind, they ceased to mock her as much. She became best friends with Christina McKinney, the first person who was nice to her at Mode. She also became friends with Marc and Amanda, and though they were occasionally mean to her and enjoyed teasing her about her clothes and ideas, they both bonded with Betty on numerous occasions such as when Amanda ran out of cash and moved in with Betty. She went to London for Hilda's bachelorette party with Amanda. She also met Christina Mckinney who is her best friend there as she is a famous designer. She wrote a column of London Fashion Week 2010 for Mr. Dunne a publisher. In the second to last episode of Season 4 she met Mr. Dunne again, who offered her a job as co-owner of a London magazine and she accepted the offer. In the last episode she met Daniel in London and asked him playfully if he wants a job to be her new assistant.

=== Daniel Meade ===
Daniel Meade, played by Eric Mabius, was named Editor-in-Chief of Mode by his father after the death of former editor-in-chief Fey Sommers; his appointment made him a target of Wilhelmina's schemes to take over the job that she felt she rightfully deserved. His womanizing and lackadaisical attitude towards his job led Bradford to hire Betty as Daniel's assistant; despite his initial reluctance and attempts to get Betty to quit, he and Betty forged a working partnership and friendship. His womanizing and later prescription drug addiction stems from his unhappy, dysfunctional family life. Sister and boss, Alexis, later convinces him to take a 'leave of absence', effectively ousting him from Mode. Retakes his job back after sales plummet but in an arrangement by Claire now shares co-EIC duties with Wilhelmina Slater. He then quit Mode and wanted to find what he is really passionate for. At the season 4 finale he went to London and met and asked Betty out to dinner.

=== Wilhelmina Slater ===
Wilhelmina Vivian Slater (née Wanda Slater), played by Vanessa Williams, is the series' main antagonist. A respected figure in the fashion industry, she was passed over in favor of Daniel Meade for the Editor-in-Chief job at Mode after the death of Fey Sommers; she initially plotted to gain control on Mode by undermining Daniel's authority, often taking advantage of his inexperience. Wilhelmina was also in league with Alexis Meade, passing along information about the Meades while Alexis recovered from gender reassignment surgery and plotted to frame Bradford Meade for the murder of Fey Sommers. In exchange for Wilhelmina's loyalty, Alexis immediately appointed her as Mode's Editor-in-Chief, but Daniel's objections based on the company charter blocked the appointment. Alexis and Wilhelmina's partnership later crumbled as Alexis reconciled with her brother; Wilhelmina then set her sights on seducing Bradford, manipulated him into divorcing Claire (the true owner of Mode) with the hope of marrying into the Meade family as a way to gain control of Mode. However, Bradford refused to relinquish Mode; Wilhelmina then plotted to sabotage Mode and start up her own magazine, Slater, in its wake once she married Bradford, but his heart attack at the altar and subsequent death squashed her claims to the Meade empire. Following this, she was immediately fired from Mode - but before leaving she crashed the Mode computers, causing them to lose an important upcoming issue. Taking advantage of the crisis, she convinced most of the Mode staff to work for Slater. The plans for Slater eventually fell apart as Wilhelmina was unable to secure the necessary funds. She then resorted to using Bradford's sperm (which Wilhelmina obtained immediately after his death by bribing a debt-ridden doctor) to produce a child in hope of claiming a substantial stake in the Meade empire; she intended to carry the child herself, but complications of a "hostile womb" led her to enlist Christina as a surrogate. Alexis promotes her to editor in chief, after she succeeds in coming back to Mode. However, she would later be demoted again after sales plummet, only to be given co-EIC duties by Claire after Claire buys out Alexis' stake in Meade publications. She became the sole editor-in-chief of Mode in the last episode of season 4 after Daniel quit the magazine.

=== Ignacio Suarez ===
Ignacio Suarez, played by Tony Plana, is Betty's father. He spent 30 years in the United States as an illegal immigrant. He fled Mexico with his wife Rosa after presumably murdering Ramiro Vasquez, Rosa's first husband, in self-defense. He was sent back to Mexico after being denied a Visa, and became a target of Ramiro Vasquez's revenge. He made it back to the U.S. safely and became a citizen, thanks to Betty's secret deal with Wilhelmina.

=== Hilda Suarez ===
Hilda Suarez Talercio, played by Ana Ortiz, is Betty's older sister. Initially protective and somewhat jealous of Betty as she pursued her career, but later became supportive. She was a sales representative for Herbalux Cosmetics until the company went under; after this she pursued a career in cosmetology and opened her own beauty salon. Single mother to Justin ever since her ex-boyfriend Santos abandoned them, but Santos later returned when she enlisted his help to cover the expenses for Ignacio's immigration dilemma; later reconciled with Santos and became engaged, but their happy ending was cut short by Santos's death. Later, she marries Bobby Talercio, her high school boyfriend, at the end of the last season.

=== Amanda Tanen ===
Amanda Tanen Sommers, played by Becki Newton, is initially hostile to Betty because she'd taken the job that Amanda was gunning for; along with Marc, she'd find ways to make Betty's job difficult—misplacing memos, "forgetting" to pass along messages, and being nasty in general. Amanda and Betty would later become 'frenemies'—joining forces when needed (such as when they were both in danger of losing their jobs) and confided in Betty about her unhappiness at being one of Daniel's many girlfriends. Despite knowing his reputation, she'd fallen in love with Daniel and hoped she'd be the one to change his ways. When it was clear that Daniel wasn't interested in getting to know Amanda beyond the bedroom, she broke off their relationship. Amanda later admitted she was given her job at Mode because her father dealt with the finances of the editor, Fey Sommers; she would later find out that Fey was actually her birth mother, who'd given Amanda up because Fey felt she couldn't devote her efforts to Mode and to being a mother at the same time. With this discovery, Amanda began a quest to find her biological father, as well as capitalize on her connection to the fashion legend to attain fame and respect. In the second-last episode of the final season, she quit Mode to be a stylist. She discovered that Spencer Cannon was her biological father.

=== Marc St. James ===
Marc St. James (né Marcus Weiner), played by Michael Urie, is the series' secondary antagonist. He was devoted to Wilhelmina, often deeply involved in her schemes to take over Mode and Meade Publications. Like Amanda, he was initially hostile to Betty but later became 'frenemies' when they were in danger of losing their jobs, as well as pretending to be a couple when Marc's overbearing mother visited. Betty had pushed a reluctant Marc to end the ruse and tell his mother that he was gay; he finally came out to his mother who seemingly disowned him because of it. He had an ex-boyfriend Cliff but broke up with him when he told him that he slept with another guy. After his break-up with Cliff, he had another boyfriend, Troy. He was promoted as Junior Fashion Editor at Mode after 5 years of being Wilhelmina's assistant. In the end of the last season Wilhelmina promoted him as the new creative director of Mode.

=== Justin Suarez ===
Justin Suarez, played by Mark Indelicato, is Betty's nephew. His love of fashion and musical theater and flamboyant attitude has brought up questions over his sexual orientation, but his family is supportive of his interests. He had clashed with his father Santos over not being a "normal boy" in Santos's eyes, but later Santos had accepted his son for the way he is. After Santos' tragic death in "the first season finale", Justin was dealing in his own way while his mother was still taking care of him, running the salon, meeting new lover interests. In Season 4, Hilda reunites with Bobby Trantino, an old high-school crush, which then they commit into a serious relationship. Throughout Hildas relationship, Bobby finds Justin kissing a boy from his acting class, Austin. Eventually, Justin comes out as gay. He is also really friendly with Marc St. James, who provides Justin with some emotional support.

=== Christina McKinney ===
Christina McKinney, played by Ashley Jensen, was the first person to befriend Betty when she arrived at Mode; with her knack for office gossip, she revealed to Betty about the true circumstances that led to Betty's hiring as Daniel's assistant. Christina is something of a social rebel, openly defying and even mocking the absurd beauty standards that Mode supports; in spite of this, no one dares fire her because she is the only one who has full knowledge of the magazine's inventory of ultra-chic designer clothes and seems to be the only seamstress capable of altering said clothes to fit whatever model or editor needs them at any given time. Despite her lack of trust in "the bitches at Mode" and especially Wilhelmina, she often became a willing pawn in Wilhelmina's schemes: as an aspiring fashion designer, Christina agreed to deliver evidence that would implicate Bradford Meade for the murder of Fey Sommers; in exchange Wilhelmina featured Christina's designs in the Mode fashion show. Christina admitted that she emigrated from Scotland five years prior to the first season, after abandoning her alcoholic husband Stuart. Stuart would later track Christina down at Mode, where he revealed he had severe liver damage and only had a few months to live, unless he secured the funds for an experimental treatment. Christina promised to get the money, but after her initial attempts failed, she reluctantly accepted Wilhelmina's offer in exchange to serve as the surrogate mother for Wilhelmina and Bradford Meade's child. She later gave birth to the baby (actually her own) during Fashion Week 2009. She eventually leaves with the baby and Stuart to go back to Scotland. She became a famous fashion designer in London and introduces Betty to Mr. Dunne who is a publisher and was last seen in Hilda's bachelorette party.

=== Alexis Meade ===
Alexis Meade (né Alexander Spencer Meade), played by Elizabeth Payne (credited as "The Mysterious Woman") and Rebecca Romijn, assigned male at birth and given the name Alex Meade, is the parent of Daniel Meade, Jr. Upon Bradford's vehement objections over her desire to have gender-affirmation surgery, she faked her death and hid for two years prior to the series start, recuperating from the surgery and emerging as Alexis. She was in league with Wilhelmina in plotting revenge against Bradford. In exchange for her loyalty, she promises Wilhelmina the editor job at Mode. Their schemes fall through as Alexis reconciles with Daniel and even attempts to make peace with her father until she finds out that he is plotting to get her out of the country. In revenge, she hires a hitman to kill Bradford, but the plan backfires. After the hitman cuts the brakes of Bradford's car, Alexis drives it, rushing to get help for Daniel following an overdose, and the car crashes. After the car crash, Alexis suffers from retrograde amnesia, but she then remembers everything. Upon Bradford's death, she and Daniel fight for control of Meade Publications, which they settle through a paintball game in the Mode offices. She briefly sides with Wilhelmina by giving her the editor-in-chief role, but she changes her mind and reinstates Daniel after sales plummet. She later gives up her role as owner of Meade Publications by giving her shares of stock back to Claire after agreeing to plead guilty to accidentally pushing Christina down a flight of stairs. Claire gave shares to Wilhelmina in return for Alexis's freedom. When released, Alexis decides to leave and live in Paris.

=== Bradford Meade ===
Bradford Meade, played by Alan Dale, placed his son Daniel in charge of Mode following the death of Fey Sommers, the previous Mode editor and Bradford's mistress; this appointment angered Wilhelmina, who immediately began plotting to take over Mode. Annoyed by Daniel's lackadaisical attitude towards work and tendency to sleep with his assistants, Bradford hired Betty knowing that Daniel would find her unattractive and get him to focus on his job. He was suspected in Fey's murder, but was cleared when his wife Claire confessed. Bradford favored his son Alex over Daniel, until Alex told Bradford that he'd wanted a sex change; Bradford vehemently objected and threatened to disown Alex if he went through with the operation. After faking his death, Alex re-emerged as Alexis and with a vendetta against Bradford. When her partnership with Alexis fell apart, Wilhelmina set her sights on seducing Bradford, hoping to marry him and seize control of Meade Publications; however, Bradford suffered a heart attack and later died before he could say "I do".

=== Walter ===
Walter, played by Kevin Sussman, was Betty's boyfriend at series start; in the pilot episode, he abruptly dumped Betty for Gina Gambarro, but then pleaded Betty to take him back after finding out that Gina only wanted him for his employee discount. He and Betty reconciled briefly, although Walter's derision of Betty's job at Mode and her ambitions in general further strained their fragile relationship. They eventually broke up when Walter decided to accept a new job in Maryland; the split was amicable as they both admitted they had been drifting apart for a long time.

=== Claire Meade ===
Claire Meade, played by Judith Light, is a recovering alcoholic, she was upset over Bradford's numerous infidelities, especially over his twenty-year-long affair with former Mode editor Fey Sommers. She had admitted to Betty that she killed Fey and attempted to leave the country in order to evade murder charges, but then turned herself in. When it was revealed that she was the true owner of Mode, Wilhelmina plotted to gain control by starting an affair with Bradford which led to his divorcing Claire in order to marry Wilhelmina; this action prompted Claire to escape from prison to stop Wilhelmina. After Bradford's death, Claire was sent back to prison to await her murder trial; she was cleared of the crime when it was revealed Claire had unknowingly been under the influence of a poisonous perfume concocted by Fey that was meant to kill Claire, but instead the perfume had caused Claire to go insane and cause the events that led to Fey's demise. Now free, she soon found herself bored and neglected by her children; after meeting with other women with similar feelings of restlessness, she was inspired to start up her own magazine, entitled Hot Flash. She and Cal Hartely had an affair and had a child Tyler Meade-Hartley.

=== Henry Grubstick ===
Henry Grubstick, played by Christopher Gorham, was originally from Tucson, Arizona. At the series start he shared a flirtation with Betty, but didn't make any serious advances since she was still involved with Walter. However, when Betty had finally broken up with Walter, Henry's ex-girlfriend Charlie had arrived from Tucson to reconcile with Henry. Betty admitted to Henry she had feelings for him, but was uncomfortable staying friends with him and Charlie. He later broke up with Charlie in order to date Betty, but then Charlie dropped in on their first date to reveal she was pregnant with Henry's child. Despite the circumstances, he and Betty start up a relationship, ever present of the looming deadline and heartbreak in store for them. The two would later break up after she turned down his marriage proposal. He also breaks up with Charlie after he returns to Arizona and now travels around the world with a new girlfriend. Later, he receives a drunk dialed message from Betty, inviting him to be her date to Hilda's wedding. The two eventually figure out they are too different to be together, and remain friends.

=== Matt Hartley ===
Matt Hartley (season 4; recurring in season 3), played by Daniel Eric Gold, is a love interest for Betty. The two hit it off, leading to indications that they could be more than just friends. He also has an MBA and almost became a lawyer. It was later revealed that he comes from a wealthy family after Betty discovered that a check sent to her family came from him. In the season 3 Finale, Matt and Betty are about to move in together. However, Matt sees Betty kissing Henry and breaks up with her at the end of the episode. In season 4, Matt ignores Betty and tries to show that he has no feelings for Betty but he has. In order to make Betty realize what she is missing, Matt takes a job as managing editor at Mode. He makes her life miserable, but they grow closer. Later on in the episode "The Bahamas Triangle", Matt kisses Betty and they get back together again, until Matt leaves in "Back in Her Place" to tour and help out in Africa.

== Recurring characters ==
Characters who appeared in at least three episodes.

Character	Actor	Notes
Amelia "Yoga" Bluman	Lorraine Toussaint	Convicted criminal who befriends Claire Meade.
Archibald “Archie” Rodriguez	Ralph Macchio	New York City Councilman for the Queens borough.
Austin Marley	Ryan McGinnis	Fellow student and eventual boyfriend of Justin Suarez.
Beckett "Becks" Scott	Bailey Chase	Daniel's best friend; Successful photographer and serial womanizer.
Bennett Wallace	Dylan Baker	Leader of "The Community of the Phoenix".
Bobby Talercio	Adam Rodriguez	The Driver’s Ed teacher at Justin’s school and Hilda’s former boyfriend.
Calvin "Cal" Hartley	David Rasche	Billionaire businessman and father of Matt Hartley.
Charlotte "Charlie"	Jayma Mays	Henry Grubstick's ex-girlfriend from Tucson.
Cliff St. Paul	David Blue	Fashion photographer who begins an unlikely romantic relationship with Marc.
Connor Owens	Grant Bowler	Long-time friend of Daniel’s who is hired as Mode's CFO.
Constance Grady	Octavia Spencer	Immigration caseworker who is assigned to Ignacio's case.
Daniel Jr.	Julian de la Celle	Illegitimate French child of the Meade family.
Elena Sanchez	Lauren Vélez	Nurse who takes care of Ignacio and becomes romantically involved.
Fabia	Gina Gershon	European fashion and cosmetics mogul.
Gina Gambarro	Ava Gaudet	Next-door neighbour of the Suarez family and arch-rival of Hilda’s.
Giovanni "Gio" Rossi	Freddy Rodriguez	Sandwich salesman who falls for Betty.
Jesse	Val Emmich	Betty's next-door neighbour; Lead singer of Dark Sexual Journey.
Jodie Papadakis	Bernadette Peters	Well-known magazine editor and teacher at the Young Editors Training Initiative.
Kenny	John Cho	Accountant at Mode and friend of Henry Grubstick.
Kimberly "Kimmie" Keegan	Lindsay Lohan	One of Betty's high school bullies.
Megan	Smith Cho	An editor at Mode who shares an office with Betty.
Molly	Sarah Lafleur	Elementary school teacher and Connor Owens' fiancée.
Natalie	Jamie-Lynn Sigler	A young woman whom Daniel meets at grief counselling.
Nick Pepper	Max Greenfield	Alexis' assistant at Mode.
Nico Slater	Jowharah Jones (season 1); Yaya DaCosta (season 4)	Wilhelmina’s rebellious daughter, with whom she has a cold and distant relationship.
Renee Slater	Gabrielle Union	Wilhelmina's mentally unstable younger sister, whose birth name is Rhonda Slater.
Santos	Kevin Alejandro	Hilda's criminal ex-boyfriend and Justin's estranged father.
Sheila	Illeana Douglas	Experienced editor at Mode.
Sofia Reyes	Salma Hayek	Editor-in-Chief of MYW and best-selling author.
Steve	Stelio Savante	Private investigator working for Bradford Meade.
Stuart	Derek Riddell	Christina's estranged husband from Scotland, with whom she eventually reunites.
Suzuki St. Pierre (alias of Byron Wu)	Alec Mapa	Flamboyant host on the Fashion Channel who often reports on the Meade family and Mode, who is eventually revealed to be a closet heterosexual whose camp persona is a front.
Ted LeBeau	Brett Cullen	Businessman and possible investor from Texas.
Tony Diaz	Eddie Cibrian	Sports coach at Justin's school.
Tyler Venton	Neal Bledsoe	Illegitimate child of both the Meade and Hartley families.
Victoria Hartley	Christine Baranski	Matt Hartley's socialite mother and Cal Hartley's ex-wife.

== See also ==
- Ugly Betty
