= Justin Suarez =

Fictional character

- Ugly Betty character
- Mark Indelicato as Justin Suarez
- First appearance: "Pilot" (episode 1.01)
- Last appearance: "Hello Goodbye" (episode 4.20)
- Created by: Silvio Horta
- Portrayed by: Mark Indelicato

In-universe information
- Species: Human
- Gender: Male
- Family: Santos Reynoso (father; deceased); Hilda Suarez (mother); Bobby Talercio (stepfather)
- Significant others: Austin Marley (boyfriend)
- Relatives: Betty Suarez (maternal aunt); Ignacio Suarez (maternal grandfather); Rosa Suarez (maternal grandmother, deceased); Yolanda Sálazar (maternal great-grandmother); Mirta (maternal great aunt); Clara (maternal first cousin-in-law once removed)
- Religion: Roman Catholic
- Nationality: American

Justin Suarez is a fictional character on the American comedy-drama series Ugly Betty (2006–2010). Portrayed by actor Mark Indelicato, Justin is raised by his mother, Hilda; both of them live with his aunt, Betty, and grandfather, Ignacio. A musical theatre and fashion enthusiast, Ugly Betty follows adolescent Justin as he matures and navigates school, while exploring his sexual orientation. Although the character exhibits stereotypically gay interests and mannerisms, the show does not address his sexuality until its fourth season, despite constant speculation and support from his family.

Justin was created by series creator Silvio Horta, who partially based the character on his own upbringing as a gay teenager raised by a single mother. The character was created to serve as a comedic foil and advisor to Betty. Deciding Justin was too young to be sexualized, the show's producers opted to leave his sexual orientation undisclosed for much of the series. Indelicato was 11 years-old when he was cast as Justin, having auditioned for the role while he was performing in a school musical production. Justin's coming out storyline mirrored Indelicato's personal life; the actor was confronting his own sexual orientation while his character was preparing to come out on the series. Instead of immediately coming out to his family, Justin confides in Betty's openly gay co-worker Marc St. James, who helps him cope with high school bullies and dating. Justin finally affirms that he is gay by dancing with his new boyfriend, Austin, at his mother's wedding at the end of the series.

Before Justin came out, Ugly Betty fans heavily speculated about the character's sexual orientation for most of the show's duration. One of the youngest gay characters on television at the time, Justin was well received by critics and audiences, who praised the subtlety of his coming out storyline. Critics were also very receptive towards Justin's acceptance by his family, which was welcomed as a refreshing representation of a Latino American family, as well as his friendship with Marc. Several media publications have since cited Justin among the greatest LGBT characters in television history.

== Role ==
Ugly Betty revolves around main character Betty Suarez (America Ferrera), an unglamorous young woman, and the challenges she faces working at the fashion magazine MODE. Justin Suarez is introduced as Betty's 11-year-old nephew, the flamboyant and fashion-obsessed son of her older sister, Hilda (Ana Ortiz). Justin is thrilled when Betty is hired as the personal assistant of Daniel Meade (Eric Mabius), editor-in-chief of MODE. Originally estranged from his father Santos (Kevin Alejandro), Justin reunites with him when Hilda begins to date him once again. Santos originally struggles to accept Justin's effeminate ways, but their relationship gradually improves. Although Justin's mother, aunt and grandfather Ignacio (Tony Plana) assume that Justin could potentially be gay, his sexual orientation goes largely unaddressed, apart from occasional hints due to his behavior and interests. Despite his family's support, Justin opts to keep his attraction to boys secret from them, instead choosing to confide in Betty's openly gay co-worker Marc St. James (Michael Urie), who becomes a friend, mentor and brotherly figure.

As Justin matures during the fourth season, he struggles to accept his own sexuality. He befriends a jock who shares his interest in musicals, only for the jock to publicly dismiss Justin when the latter's athletic friends tease him about their friendship. Justin is forced to enroll in public school after he is rejected by the performing arts high school of his choice. Bullied by his schoolmates, he is disparagingly crowned homecoming queen, which he embraces by bestowing the crown and title upon his mother. Marc advises Justin to befriend his school's cheerleaders for protection from bullies.

Marc guides Justin towards gradually coming out of the closet. Originally, Justin briefly asserts his "heterosexuality", pretending to like his classmate Lily, whom he kisses in a school production, before accepting his feelings for male friend Austin (Ryan McGinnis) upon kissing him shortly afterward. Hilda's new fiancé, Bobby Talercio (Adam Rodriguez), discovers them kissing but promises not to tell Justin's family. Stopping his family from holding a surprise coming out party for Justin before he comes out himself, Marc advises them to simply allow Justin to come out to them at his own pace. Shortly after beginning to date Austin, Justin finally decides to come out as gay at his mother's wedding in the penultimate episode of the series. Instead of publicly announcing his sexuality, Justin quietly leads Austin onto the dancefloor, where they dance among his family.

== Development ==
=== Creation and casting ===
According to the show's early stage directions, Ugly Betty creator Silvio Horta conceived Justin "as an effeminate 11- or 12-year-old" boy. Although the show originally opted to not address Justin's sexual orientation, Horta – who was gay himself – decided the character should experience a gradual journey as he matures. However, Horta did not write Justin with the intention of creating television's first gay child character, but simply as "a humorous foil for Betty", serving as a young fashion-forward advisor for the main character. Because Justin and his struggles with his sexuality were partially inspired by Horta's own life and upbringing, the creator was particularly fond of the character and approached his coming out delicately. Specifically, Justin and Hilda's relationship is based on Horta's experience growing up with a single mother. Having come out to his own Cuban-American family at age 19, Horta saw some aspects of himself in Justin, elaborating, "Growing up, I certainly felt like an outsider at times. But there's this sweet innocence in Justin that sees the positive". Similar to Justin, Horta also preferred the arts over sports, particularly excelling in writing, although he described himself as "never quite as flamboyant or as into fashion or, you know, musical theater” as the character he created.

'Ugly Betty' has definitely helped me cope with issues I would have never been able to cope with if I wasn't a part of a show that has such unique characters ... that's why people can relate to Justin -- because he's like that too. They can see that he does feel different and he gets made fun of for the clothes he wears. To see him finally accept and be happy with who he is and who he has become is a great message for any teen to learn from a character, and that's just something that is crazy and great for me."

— Actor Michael Indelicato, on his character Justin's impact on both himself and viewers.

Justin is portrayed by American actor Mark Indelicato, who was 11 years old when he was cast in the role. Passionate about performing from a young age, the actor answered a casting call for the character who was described as "not a buff typical Latino boy", while performing in his school's production of the musical Forty-five Minutes from Broadway. Apart from commercials and theatre, Indelicato had only had two guest television roles before being cast in Ugly Betty, which would become his breakthrough performance. Describing Justin as a great character, Indelicato was drawn to the role due to its inspirational arc. Horta recalled that Indelicato nailed his audition, crediting the actor with making Justin "a real character and a real performance" while identifying him as one of the show's best early surprises. Indelicato believes the writers initially did not quite know what to do with Justin's character, since he was originally envisioned as little more than the show's "funny, flamboyant, kind of questionable kid", created mainly "to counter Betty in a humorous and touching way". In fact, Indelicato was surprised when actress America Ferrera, who portrays Betty, suggested that Justin might be gay by saying he reminds her of her own gay nephew.

Agreeing that the pre-adolescent character was too young to sexualize, Horta decided Justin's sexual orientation should not factor into the series until much later, believing this would in turn support the show's message that a character's sexuality is inconsequential. Instead, he described the character in early episodes as simply "a kid who’s different than other boys", and confirmed that, despite unconditional support from his family, "we’re going to see some conflict as his father sort of comes back into his life". Ugly Betty's parent network, ABC, would typically avoid providing a direct answer when asked about Justin's sexual orientation by the media. In 2007, Indelicato told a reporter that Justin's orientation is unconfirmed, and the decision "has nothing to do with me." In a 2009 interview, Horta confirmed that Justin's sexuality would finally be addressed in the then-upcoming fourth season. Justin originally denies being gay to his family in the fourth season episode "Backseat Betty". Horta opted to incorporate denial into Justin's coming out storyline because the writers wanted the character to gradually come to terms with his sexual identity over the course of a year, explaining, "when he says that, it’s really the beginning of telling the story ... It gives us a place to go to. He’s gonna be struggling with his identity, and that’s part of it that’s very realistic and relatable. Not really knowing who you are or what you are." Agreeing that Justin requires some assistance from his friends and family to come out, Indelicato considers the writers' decision to forge a friendship between his character and Marc to be "one of the best moves the writers made in terms of Justin's development". Actor Michael Urie, who plays Marc, concurred that a positive friendship between an older and younger gay man was a rare dynamic never conveyed on television prior to Ugly Betty. Despite viewer speculation that Justin has a crush on Marc, Horta insisted that Justin's admiration is platonic and solely resembles that of an "older brother he wishes he had". Horta said although audiences are welcome to their own interpretations of their relationship, "the last thing we need for the show right now is a [romantic] relationship between a 15-year-old and this older guy."

Indelicato avoided reading Ugly Betty forums online, in which fans often wrote unkind comments about his character. Indelicato was exploring his own sexual orientation during Justin's coming out arc prior to coming out himself, personally identifying with the storyline. Despite crediting the series with helping him cope with his own coming out, Indelicato claims he did not commit to the storyline for himself, but rather "for everyone out there that doesn't have a person to talk to ... [we] went into [filming] saying this is history". Whereas Horta was concerned about pushing Indelicato's acting "too far" because he and his character were going through similar experiences simultaneously, Indelicato's female co-stars went to great lengths to ensure the actor felt comfortable on set, which Ferrera likened to Justin's family hosting a surprise coming out party for him. The actor was nervous to film his character's first kiss because he was unsure if it would be well-received upon airing. Despite concerns that the show would treat Justin's coming out as a "dramatic breakdown crying moment", Indelicato ultimately praised the writers for approaching Justin's self-discovery in a graceful, unclichéd manner, hoping the scene would encourage closeted youth to be themselves among their family and friends. In a 2016 interview, Indelicato revealed that he had not yet realized "the impact that the story would have on other young people or on people who wished that they had a character like that on when they were going through that process." Ferrera complimented the maturity with which Indelicato approached Justin's material and surrounding press as a young actor. In 2021, the actor said he did not realize how important his portrayal and character became until he was 25, and is grateful to have been a part of changing the perception of queer people on television "over the last 15 years".

=== Characterization and themes ===
Indelicato considers Justin to be a dynamic character who is "far more than just his sexual orientation." Justin is passionate about Broadway musicals and fashion. A devoted fan of MODE, he idolizes creative director Wilhelmina Slater (Vanessa Williams). The character's interest in fashion serves as a foil to his aunt Betty who, despite working for a fashion magazine, is initially clueless about fashion. Despite exhibiting stereotypical personality traits commonly associated with gay men, such as a strong interest in fashion and Broadway, as well as sometimes worrying about gaining weight, the word "gay" is rarely used to describe him until later into the final season. The closest the Suarez family comes to labeling Justin's sexuality is referring to him as "mighty festive". The character struggles with uncertainty and denial before embracing his sexuality, exploring the challenges of "Being that overtly camp kid at school". Another early hint occurs when Marc tells Betty "I’m sure your nephew is tired of being in the closet", after Justin spends much of the afternoon working in MODE's wardrobe department. Waymon Hudson of LGBTQ Nation described Justin as "an effeminate, musical-loving, fashion designing, tap dancing, kid" who is "secure and happy with who he is in all his fabulousity". In a first-season episode, the character reenacts the Broadway musical Hairspray (2002) while stranded on a crowded subway during a snowstorm. TV Guide's Angelique Anest believes Justin's "wings [were] clipped by not growing up inside the sequined and bedazzled mansion he occupied in his head." In a 2006 article, Gretchen Dukowitz of Advocate theorized that ABC's hesitance to confirm Justin's homosexuality "doesn’t mean he won’t eventually come out", observing that the show shares a network with the sitcom on which comedian Ellen DeGeneres came out as gay.

Due to Justin's young age, the show avoids sexualizing the character despite his unapologetic flamboyance. Commenting on the character's age, Slate's June Thomas observed that although the then 12 year-old Justin might be "too young to be gay ... he’s certainly not too young to be tormented ... for his love of fashion, musical theater, and whatever else it is that TV homosexuals like." Although Hilda, Justin's single mother, at times wishes he would behave "more like a 'normal' boy" to spare him the harassment sometimes endured by gay boys, she continues to support him wholeheartedly. Lyle Masaki of NewNowNext.com summarized Justin as a character who grows from "an effeminate pre-teen his family presumed would come out as gay someday, to the teen who rebels by insisting he’s straight and finally the boy who falls in love for the first time and realizes nothing matters as much." NPR's Joe Reid observed that while most television series approach coming out stories "like the dropping of nuclear bombs", Ugly Betty's Justin "was able to explore the challenges in growing up 'different,' even in a world that's rapidly coming around." Similarly, Alexander Stevenson of NewNowNext.com believes the subtle manner in which Justin learns about his sexuality "mirror[s] what many gay adolescents go through—covering up fear and self-doubt with a forced confidence and fabulousness" but "Once Justin discovered Justin, he became confident."

Describing the character as "precociously smart", Urie identified Justin's family as a "beautiful example of how people across this country could deal with a situation that's maybe outside their comfort zone." Calling Justin "an update to the gay Latino teen", Manuel Betancourt of Remezcla considers the character to be a successor to Rickie Vasquez from My So-Called Life, explaining, "where Vazquez struggled with family acceptance, Justin was born into, and eventually came out to, a happy, supportive family who loved him no matter what."

== Critical response ==
Justin established himself as an early favorite among Ugly Betty fans. In 2006, The Austin Chronicle's Belinda Acosta predicted Justin would develop a cult following due to the series' delicate treatment of his impending future as a gay man. Even during the show's earliest seasons when the character was still a pre-teen, audiences heavily speculated about Justin's sexual orientation before he came out. Gay fans were captivated by Justin, who reminded them of their younger selves. In 2006, GLAAD originally did not include Justin in their annual tally of gay, lesbian, bisexual and transgender characters on television; GLAAD entertainment media director Damon Romine explained the character was omitted due to his unconfirmed sexuality, elaborating, "To say he’s gay based on [his personality] means viewers are letting stereotypes decide for them the definition of gender and sexuality." Romine predicted Justin's sexual orientation would likely be if the show continues to air long enough. The following year, however, GLAAD acknowledged Justin during the 2007-2008 primetime television season when adolescent LGBT characters were becoming more prevalent, identifying him as "A character that already has a strong connection with the audience", continuing, "Most importantly, the love and support he receives from his multi-generational Latino family presents a strong and positive example of acceptance to viewers." Irene Lacher of The Hollywood Reporter named Justin Ugly Betty's breakthrough character, citing him as an example of gay television characters becoming more complex as of 2007. Justin was one of the youngest gay characters on television at the time, eventually becoming one of television's few openly gay teenagers. According to the Bucks County Courier Times correspondent Michael Elkin, Justin was one of television's "few flamboyant gay characters not created as a caricature", while the Yale Daily News contributor Claire Gordon called Justin "an unprecedented prime-time example of a possibly gay or questioning youth." Although teenage characters exploring their sexuality were becoming more common on television, the Los Angeles Times' Maria Elena Fernandez believes Justin "stands out because TV viewers have never before seen a child slowly growing into himself in quite this way."

In September 2007, Slate identified Justin as one of the characters the magazine looks forward to watching during the fall 2007 television season, calling his family's support a lovely but fantastical scenario. In a 2007 article, the Tulsa World's William Keck named Justin "TV's most atypical male child." Keck also praised Indelicato's confident portrayal, describing Justin as "an integral component of" Ugly Betty. Maria Elena Fernandez of the Los Angeles Times reflected that, during the show's early seasons, Justin "stood out as a fresh TV character, a child too young to understand or proclaim his sexual orientation but compellingly comfortable in his own skin." Fernandez concluded, "That he was part of a traditional Latino family that embraced him no matter what ... only made Justin more distinct in the TV landscape." The Advocate described Justin's arc as "dramatically powerful and comically relatable television that shouldn’t be missed." Upon re-watching the pilot, the author admitted to being "struck by how [much of a] breakthrough the character of Justin was in terms of being a young, unapologetically fem character." Identifying Ugly Betty as "the gayest show on TV", LGBTQ Nation's Waymon Hudson praised Justin's positive relationship with his mother, calling it "a moving TV moment that will resonate with LGBTQ youth who go through the same thing every day." Justin and Marc's friendship also received similar acclaim. Conversely, Michael Jensen of AfterElton.com accused ABC of being cowardly by not affirming Justin's sexual orientation, writing, "By not saying one way or the other if Justin is gay, they’re either communicating that there’s something wrong or shameful about being gay...or they’re playing games with viewers. Americans need to acknowledge there are gay 11- and 12-year-olds in society.” In a letter to Advocate's editor, two readers criticized the magazine for publishing Jensen's comments, accusing the publication of focusing on Justin's character instead of "giving us any useful information about the character or the amazing Indelicato". Some adult viewers criticized the character on online forums, accusing him of "teaching children to be gay." Indelicato appeared on an episode of Dr. Phil to discuss some of the vitriol he received due to portraying a gay character, which included death threats.

Justin's coming out storyline was widely praised by critics. Writing for the GLAAD website, Lauren Mattia said Justin "sheds a much needed light on the struggles that gay teens face as they try to come to terms with their newly discovered identity." Describing Justin's first kiss as well-handled, Tim Stack of Entertainment Weekly commended producers "for putting something so brave and progressive on network television. I can’t think of another series that has tackled coming out with someone so young. It’s an important and delicate issue that should be addressed more often." Describing the kiss as historic, Vulture's Caryn Ganz praised Indelicato's performance for perfectly capturing "the murkiness of the moment". Joking that Justin's sexuality was television's worst-kept secret for four years, Joe Reid of NPR commended Ugly Betty for "always handl[ing] the Justin story with great care". Commending Horta for realistically conveying "the gay teen story", Reid lamented that the show's impending cancellation would deprive audiences of one of television's "most forward-thinking depictions of gay characters". Alexander Stevenson of NewNowNext.com praised his coming out as a "poignant yet powerful gesture" in which "Justin became the man we all were hoping for." Queerty wrote that while some critics might dismiss Justin's acceptance by his family as fantastical, they congratulated the writers for depicting "a Mexican-American fey kid coming out to his mother in front of millions of viewers" in a non-chintzy manner. Richard Lawson of Gawker wrote that although Justin can sometimes resemble a stereotypically gay teenager, "it's a stereotype for a damn reason. People like Justin exist, and Ugly Betty wanted to do that kind of character, so god bless 'em." Lawson continued, "Justin's steps toward coming out have been both painful and silly, the way life usually is. He's a kid that everyone had figured out long ago, but the show correctly urges us to remember that Saying It (or in Justin's case, Dancing It) still matters, despite how 'obvious' it might be." According to Metacritic, "Indelicato instantly won the hearts of viewers and ... sparked an interesting public discussion about sexual orientation in adolescents."

While the show was airing from 2006 to 2010, it was still considered "taboo" to show a gay minor on television. Citing Justin as an example of gay teenagers dominating television by 2010, The Guardian's Morwenna Ferrier reported that Justin came out to millions of American viewers weeping, with gay rights campaigner Peter Tatchell recognizing Justin's coming out as "a landmark moment" and "sign of the huge social progress we've made". Shortly after Justin's coming out episode, NewNowNext.com crowned Justin "Gay of the Week", narrowly beating Marc by earning two-thirds of the vote. Writer Alexander Stevenson praised the show's writers and Indelicato "for bringing this endearing character’s coming out journey to a satisfying and truly hopeful conclusion." Entertainment Weekly television critic Tanner Stransky wrote "The fact that the show so smartly and subtly portrayed the coming out of 16-year-old Justin last week is reason enough to love this show and understand why it was so important for network television." Reviewing "The Past Presents the Future", Stransky credits moments such as Justin's coming out with helping "Ugly Betty go down in television history." Autostraddle television critics named Justin one of their favorite "baby gays" of all-time, believing Ugly Betty approached his storylines better than some of its successors, calling it "near perfection" and deserving of more attention. Screen Rant's Zarreen Moghbelpour ranked Justin Ugly Betty's seventh most likeable character, describing him as "an encouraging presence on the show and a person who is true to who he is."

== Impact and legacy ==
Several media publications have recognized Justin as one of the greatest and most influential LGBT characters on television. NewNowNext.com's Alexander Stevenson wrote that Justin provided "mainstream audiences" with "an effeminate and nontraditional teen who is proud and confident and whose family loves him unconditionally, delivering a beautiful message of acceptance of gay or questioning youth." Entertainment Tonight's Manuel Betancourt believes the character has had a positive impact on an entire generation of LGBT teenagers who "found strength in Justin’s self-assurance". Identifying Justin as one of "12 Latinx LGBTQ TV Characters Who Made Us Feel Seen", Betancourt called the character "a welcome vision of what a supportive family can look like", highlighting Justin's supportive relationship with mother Hilda as "refreshing". Elle writer Gabe Bergado believes "If you were a gay kid in the closet during the ‘00s, the love Hilda had for her son gave you the much-needed hope that everything would be all right." According to Betancourt, Justin's coming out "further solidified his iconic status." Decider.com ranked Justin the 18th "Most Important LGBTQ TV Character of All-Time". STYLECASTER cited Justin among 20 millennium-defining LGBTQ characters, with Jason Pham writing that Ugly Betty deserves as much praise for Justin's characterization as the show's positive depiction of a Latino family. Gay Times named Justin one of television's 30 most iconic queer characters, with author Sam Damshenas describing him as "incredibly influential". Parade's Mary Margaret recognized Justin as one of television's most groundbreaking gay characters, commending the show for approaching his developing adolescent sexuality "humorously and tenderly."

In 2013, NewNowNext.com ranked Justin television's 28th greatest gay character, one of only seven men of color on the list. Identifying the character as a precursor to Glee's Kurt Hummel, author Alexander Stevenson hailed Justin as "a bashful yet boastful youngster who could dually make you laugh and pull at your heartstrings", crediting him with helping viewers find themselves while the character found himself. Recognizing Justin as one of "The Stereotypical Gay Male TV Characters That Shaped Us", QX Magazine wrote "The great thing about this character was how naturally the camp-ness came to him, giving a massive middle finger to those people who claimed being gay was a choice." The writer also lauded the character for "showing a traditional latin family trying to deal with a little boy who was different. He was also one of the few gay characters that wasn’t that well off, being born and raised in a little house in Queens, literal miles away from the aforementioned Manhattan gays." In June 2016, Remezcla's Manuel Betancourt named Justin one of 20 "LGBT Latino TV Characters To Celebrate This Pride Month". NewNowNext.com considers Justin's coming out in the episode "The Past Presents the Future" to be among the best coming out scenes in Hollywood history. Attitude named Justin's coming out one of television's five most memorable coming out scenes. PopSugar ranked Justin and Austin's first kiss among "The Best Queer Love Scenes" of the 2010s, with author Chris Malone Méndez calling its depiction of young gay love "groundbreaking at the time" and "a satisfying resolution not just for Justin, but for all young queer fans of the show". In 2019, Refinery29 called Justin's coming out one of the best "In Pop Culture History". Despite the character's popularity, Lee Hernandez of Latina lamented that Justin's success ultimately did not result in an increase of gay Latino characters on television.

Some fans have called Indelicato a gay icon since the show's conclusion. Dr. Phil's website states that the actor's role "became an iconic character for a lot of gay, lesbian, transgender teens." Indelicato received fan mail from young fans thanking him for his portrayal, claiming they had "never seen themselves represented on television before." In 2007, Indelicato recalled that his fan mail primarily consists of "kids that don’t really fit in [because] people don’t really understand them", thanking him for "helping me to be understood by my peers,’ and anybody else who doesn't understand them. That touches me. I'm glad that I'm reaching such a large amount of people.” The actor said he had not realized how groundbreaking his character was until after the show was canceled, explaining that he had just been having fun with the role prior. As of 2020, actress Ana Ortiz, who plays Justin's mother Hilda on the series, portrays the mother of the titular character in the teen drama series Love, Victor, another Latinx teenager learning about his sexuality.
