= Mark Indelicato =

American actor (born 1994)

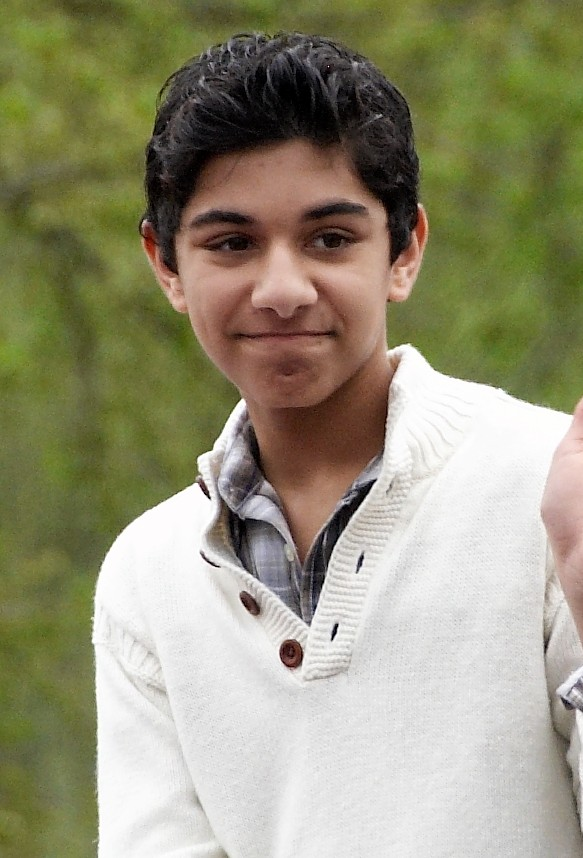
- Mark Indelicato, 2008
- Born: July 16, 1994 (age 32); Philadelphia, Pennsylvania, U.S.
- Education: New York University (attended)
- Occupation: Actor
- Years active: 2000–present

Mark Indelicato (born July 16, 1994) is an American actor best known for his role in the ABC comedy series Ugly Betty as Justin Suarez, the fashion-obsessed nephew of series protagonist Betty Suarez, and in the HBO Max series Hacks as Damien.

== Life and career ==
Indelicato was born in Philadelphia, the son of Lynn and Mark Indelicato, Sr. He is of three-quarters Italian and one quarter Puerto Rican descent. He was trained at The Actors Center in that city, and was a student at Dupree School of Music in Linwood, New Jersey. He began acting at age eight at Philadelphia's Walnut Street Theater, and has appeared in national television commercials, Chappelle's Show, and was a regular cast member of Ugly Betty on ABC until the series ended in 2010. He also attended the Professional Performing Arts School before moving back to Los Angeles. He later attended New York University's Gallatin School of Individualized Study.

Indelicato was featured in an episode of the Disney Channel Original Series The Suite Life of Zack & Cody in a special High School Musical-themed episode.

On October 27, 2008, Indelicato performed the part of Boq for the "Wicked Day" 5th Anniversary Concert on Broadway in New York City as well. He performed again at the Gershwin Theatre on February 28, 2009 for the "Defying Inequality" benefit.

He starred as the Artful Dodger in the CLO production of Oliver! in Pittsburgh, Pennsylvania.

He appeared on a special episode of Dr. Phil which discussed teens who were being bullied after coming out. He shared his experience when he received numerous death threats and verbal abuse from people for his role on Ugly Betty.

Indelicato played Damien, assistant to comedian Deborah Vance, in the HBO Max series Hacks (2021–2026).

== Filmography ==
=== Film ===
Year	Title	Role	Notes
2003	Disposal	Kid on Bike	Short
2014	White Bird in a Blizzard	Mickey	
2025	She's the He	Davis	

=== Television ===
Year	Title	Role	Notes
2003	Hack	Berge	Episode: "Forgive, But Don't Forget"
2004	Chappelle's Show	Kneehigh Park Kid	Season 2, episode 10
2006–2010	Ugly Betty	Justin Suarez	85 Episodes
2007	The Suite Life of Zack & Cody	Antonio	Episode: "Lip Synchin' in the Rain"
2009	MTV Cribs	Self	Season 16, episode 12
2010	Hot in Cleveland	Zack	Episode: "The Play's The Thing"
2011	Madison High	Harvey Flynn	Pilot
2016	Dead of Summer	Blair Ramos	Series regular
2021–2023	With Love	Jorge Diaz Jr.	Series regular
2021–2026	Hacks	Damien	Series regular (42 Episodes)
2022	RuPaul's Secret Celebrity Drag Race	Thirsty Von Trap	Season 2 contestant

=== Web ===
Year	Title	Role	Notes
2012	Oishi High School Battle	Aubrey	Episode: "The Gay Kid"

== Awards and nominations ==
Year	Award	Category	Work	Result	Ref.
2006	Actor Awards	Outstanding Performance by an Ensemble in a Comedy Series	Ugly Betty	Nominated	
2007	Actor Awards	Outstanding Performance by an Ensemble in a Comedy Series	Ugly Betty	Nominated	
2021	Actor Awards	Outstanding Performance by an Ensemble in a Comedy Series	Hacks	Nominated	
2022	Actor Awards	Outstanding Performance by an Ensemble in a Comedy Series	Hacks	Nominated	
2024	Actor Awards	Outstanding Performance by an Ensemble in a Comedy Series	Hacks	Nominated	
2025	Actor Awards	Outstanding Performance by an Ensemble in a Comedy Series	Hacks	Nominated	
