= Dawn DeKeyser =

Dawn DeKeyser is an American television writer and producer.

She is credited on a number of prime time TV series including Ugly Betty, NewsRadio, The Geena Davis Show, Conrad Bloom, Ink, Becker and Samantha Who?. She has written television pilots for NBC, ABC Studios, Lionsgate and DreamWorks Television, has won numerous scriptwriting awards and was granted an ABC/Disney Writers Fellowship early in her career.

DeKeyser was born at the Misawa Air Base in Japan and was raised in Europe and the United States.
