= Roberta Myers =

American magazine editor

- Born: November 10, 1964 (age 61); Pottstown, Pennsylvania, U.S.
- Education: Colorado State University
- Known for: Editor-in-chief of Elle (US edition)
- Children: 2

Roberta "Robbie" Myers (born November 10, 1964) is the longest-serving editor-in-chief and vice president of brand content of the US edition of the fashion media brand Elle. Myers led Elle for nearly eighteen years, having been named editor-in-chief in 2000. During her tenure, Elle experienced unprecedented success, while maintaining its reputation for covering fashion, culture, beauty and social and political issues from an elevated perspective. In September 2015, Elle published the largest issue in parent-company Hearst's 128-year history.

== Early life ==
Myers grew up all over the United States, living in St. Louis; Philadelphia; Estes Park, Colorado; Fort Lauderdale; and New York City. She attended Colorado State University in 1982 on a diving scholarship and received a degree in political science.

== Career ==
Myers was named editor-in-chief of Elle magazine in May 2000, and was responsible for content creation across all Elle platforms.

Prior to joining Elle, Myers worked at Mirabella magazine, where she had been named editor in 1995, and editor-in-chief in April 1998. Before Mirabella, she was a senior editor at Elle; a senior editor at InStyle during the Time Inc. launch; and editor-in-chief of Tell. She was managing editor at Seventeen. She worked at Interview, for Andy Warhol, and began her career at Rolling Stone.

In September 2017, Myers announced her departure from the role of editor-in-chief of Elle, but also stated that will remain at Hearst Communications in a consulting capacity.

== Personal life ==
Myers lives in Manhattan with her children. Subsequent to her leave from Elle, her Upper West side apartment was caught in a fire. Myers and her children were unharmed.
