= Betty Suarez =

- Ugly Betty character
- First appearance: "Pilot" (episode 1.01).
- Last appearance: "Hello Goodbye" (episode 4.20)
- Created by: Silvio Horta
- Based on: Beatriz Pinzón Solano by Fernando Gaitán
- Portrayed by: America Ferrera

In-universe information
- Full name: Beatriz U. Suarez
- Nicknames: Betty; Granny Pants (in high school); Bomb-B, B, Chipmunk, Tornado Girl
- Gender: Female
- Occupation: Co-owner and executive producer of a London magazine (2010-present); Former; Features editor at Mode (2009–2010); Personal assistant (to Daniel Meade; [Mode; 2006, 2007–2009, 2010] [Player Magazine; 2008]) (to Wilhelmina Slater; Mode; 2008) (to Sofia Reyes; MYW; 2007)
- Family: Ignacio Suarez (father); Rosa Suarez (mother; deceased); Hilda Suarez (older sister); Justin Suarez (nephew)
- Significant others: Walter (ex-boyfriend); Henry Grubstick (ex-boyfriend); Gio Rossi (ex-boyfriend); Jesse (fling); Matt Hartley (ex-boyfriend); Zachary Boule (ex-boyfriend); Daniel Meade (boss/potential future romance)
- Relatives: Yolanda Sálazar (maternal grandmother); Mirta (paternal aunt); Clara (paternal cousin-in-law); Bobby Talercio (brother-in-law)
- Religion: Roman Catholic
- Nationality: Mexican American

Beatriz U. Suarez is the protagonist of the American comedy-drama series Ugly Betty. She is portrayed by America Ferrera, who won a 2007 Golden Globe Award and 2007 Screen Actors Guild Award for her portrayal of the character, as well as the Primetime Emmy Award for Outstanding Lead Actress in a Comedy Series for the role at the 59th Primetime Emmy Awards and was nominated again in the same category at the 60th Primetime Emmy Awards. AOL named her one of the 100 Most Memorable Female TV Characters.

== Fictional biography ==
=== Background and early life ===
Betty Suarez lives in the Jackson Heights neighborhood in the New York City borough of Queens. In junior high, Betty won the Good Citizens award. Betty gave the award back to the school but later took it back and the principal called her a bad citizen. She attended Queens Borough High School, graduating in 2002, where she was salutatorian and received a Regents diploma. Betty was cast as a rock in a school play. She never went to the Senior prom, staging an anti-prom with her best friend Trina, who later was invited to the event. Betty and Trina did not speak to each other again until 2007. A member of the Music Association; she received an award for playing the cymbals and triangle. Betty also performed as a mascot for the basketball team, for which she was named "Most Inspirational Basketball Mascot"; as she was the yearbook editor, it is possible she gave this title to herself.

She attended Queens College, in Flushing, Queens, described as "one of America's best value colleges". She graduated QC in December 2005, with a BFA in Media, Cum Laude. She was treasurer of the Latina Women's League, as well as yearbook editor and a contributor for the school newspaper, the Knight Journal. Her real goal is to become a magazine publisher, which explains her journalistic credentials.

During the summer before attending college and two summers during college, she worked at Corona Cones as a "Soft Serve Specialist/Weekend Night Manager". There she "managed a crew of 2 (including self)", "initiated and maintained soft-serve machine during the double-scoop crossover", and fulfilled "party clown duties as needed".

Suarez then worked at Pro-Buy store #8474 as a part-time human resources coordinator, from summer 2004 to August 2005. She designed the monthly "What's Up, Pro Buy!" employee newsletter.

Suarez then took advantage of two internships. In the summer of 2004, she was at the weekly magazine Politics & More, collaborating on research for the July 2004 cover article on Presidential hopefuls and their wives. Next summer, she interned at Daily Dermatology Magazine; her stay at this Flatbush, Brooklyn publication focused on research for a five-part series on pores for the then upcoming Wide World of Skin convention.

Suarez is fluent in English and also speaks a bit of Spanish, and can speak some Mandarin Chinese. She can also speak some Portuguese, as she called a spa in Brazil during one episode.

She is a "yearly fundraising participant", winner of the 2004 Rotary Club Speech Contest, current coordinator of the Neighborhood Watch program for her area, a math tutor, a county chamber singer, an honorary member of the local Historical Society, and one point worked as a batgirl for the New York Mets.

=== Employment at Mode ===
Despite others perceiving Betty Suarez as "geeky, unattractive, and a total goth", she does land a job at the prestigious fashion magazine Mode, where she serves as the personal assistant of Daniel Meade; the magazine's new editor-in-chief, put in place by his father (Bradford Meade) after the previous editor, Fey Sommers, was killed having her brake lines in her car cut. Despite Daniel's less than enthusiastic reaction to working with her, Betty does win him over. Daniel is known to be a womanizer, and Betty prevents temptation from getting in his way in the world of fashion. She keeps her job because of her attitude, skill and stoicism. Despite having a majority of her first check being taken out for taxes, Betty's earnings at Mode are around $37,810 a year.

However, Betty is not admired by co-workers, who feel threatened by her presence: Wilhelmina Slater, the magazine's Creative Director, who wanted the job of editor-in-chief, her cohort Marc St. James, and magazine receptionist Amanda Tanen, are determined to sabotage Betty and Daniel at any cost, but for different reasons. Betty finds an unlikely friend, Christina McKinney, a seamstress whose knowledge about what goes on at Mode will play a vital part in their relationship. Betty's fashion sense, glasses, hair, her short stature, and working-class roots in Queens are often mocked by her colleagues, however Suarez manages to work towards overcoming this. Betty is also slightly clumsy, often knocking into things, most notably plexiglass windows. Betty remains centered and focused amongst the clashing of egos and eccentric behavior of her colleagues.

Betty has also found herself embroiled with the Meade family in more ways than one. Bradford trusts her because she can keep Daniel's financial responsibilities intact while Daniel trusts her because she can deliver and take charge. She is also aware of Claire Meade's problems with alcoholism (she slapped a bottle right out of Claire's hands), but learned later Claire was the person who killed Fey; when Claire told Betty she wanted to leave the country rather than face murder charges, Betty talked her out of it and convinced Claire to turn herself in. Betty was also impressed by Alexis Meade's recent sex-change to the point of where she asked Alexis about where she can buy a hormone patch so she wouldn't use bleach to get rid of her mustache. When Daniel and Alexis began feuding over the ownership of Meade Publications, Betty stepped in and played mediator and forced them to talk it out in front of their mother while in bumper cars at Coney Island. Thanks to Betty, both Daniel and Alexis agreed to a truce until the matter over the company was settled.

Since she started working alongside Daniel, she has helped him with his sexual and drug addictions, repair his trust with family and improve his abilities as an Editor-In-Chief, along with getting him out of trouble, like exposing a Mother/daughter team trying to blackmail him. Daniel in turn has also help Betty with her own faults, mostly in the romance department and trying to open up her talents as a writer. However, there were a couple of incidents that almost ended that: When Betty tried to protect Daniel from a tell-all writer, Daniel lashed out at her, resulting in Betty giving Daniel the cold shoulder. The second time came when she witnessed Wilhelmina sleeping with her bodyguard while trying to get the mock-up from Wilhelmina's apartment. When Wilhelmina bribed Betty into not telling Daniel about her romp, Betty agreed and betrayed Daniel, but is fired at Wilhelmina and Bradford's wedding after she came clean. He would later regret that after Ignacio went straight to the hospital and told Daniel the reason. As Betty told Daniel she wasn't the same person that walked into MODE and she wanted to give up her job, it would be Bradford telling her not to, first at the hospital prior to his passing and later as her subconscious.

Betty would be the one to help Claire and her murder conviction, first by making sure Alexis and Daniel would continue as owners of Meade Publications and reconcile with Bradford before his death. In the episode Odor in the Court, as Claire goes to trial for murdering Fey, some new evidence surfaces in the Love Dungeon, along with a bottle of perfume Claire gives to Betty for safekeeping during the trial. Fey's diary reveals in an attempt to kill Claire, Fey had sent a bottle of poisoned perfume to Bradford to give to Claire as a 'souvenir' driving her to madness and kill her. By a stroke of fate, Claire's insanity resulted in Fey's own death instead. After Betty nearly kills herself with the perfume, and after Amanda is convinced to hand over the evidence to Betty, Claire is found not guilty and freed. Therefore, Mode is now back in Claire's control.

As of the second-season finale, Wilhelmina Slater became the editor-in-chief at Mode.

In the 3rd season, Wilhelmina tried to once again manipulate Betty by luring her back to working with her, and succeeded. This sudden turn of events, along with an attempt to mold her into the next "Wilhelmina" didn't set well with Marc, so he gave Betty a bag of letters sent to Daniel setting the stage for Betty's decision to resign as Wilhelmina's assistant, Daniel returning to his EIC job at Mode and his rehiring of Betty, and Wilhelmina's demotion back to Creative Director.

Soon, Christina is pushed down a flight of stairs by an unknown person which results in Betty finding through Mode's staff to find the culprit, finally learning that Alexis was the one. Alexis goes to jail but thanks to Claire, she is reduced to just doing community service. After Alexis leaves for Paris, Betty has to deal with Gio returning from Italy (the trip which Betty rejected in the second-season finale). Gio who is angry towards Betty acts cold and bans her from his deli and life but Betty perseveres to win his heart back by tricking him into helping her get DJ away from his grandparents. After the issue, the two reconcile but Gio wants to try something different for love and leaves Betty.

She also begins to study at the YETI program for young editors with Marc. In the third-season finale Betty and Marc compete for an editor's job at Mode. Daniel and Wilhelmina can't decide which one to hire, and finally make the decision by flipping a coin, and Betty gets the promotion.

In the series finale Betty leaves Mode for a job in London (as a side note, in the Mode After Hours webisode she has a UK counterpart named Velita). Daniel realizes that he has feelings for Betty and wants to be more than friends. He asks her out to dinner, a date and she says "I'd love to". Later, Betty asks Daniel if he wants a new job, joking that she is searching for an assistant.

=== Personal life ===
At home in Queens, Betty has to deal with her father Ignacio and sister Hilda, who feel she's been taken for a ride at her job and are concerned she's being used like a puppet because of her appearance. However, her nephew Justin is the only person who supports Betty and thinks she should continue pursuing her dreams.

Betty believes her job will help solve the legal hassles she has to deal with in trying to get an HMO provider for her father, who has a heart condition and has been told not to drink any products containing caffeine, like coffee. But those efforts have Betty questioning the real reason why her father has avoided the doctor when it is discovered he has been using a Social Security number and name of a deceased person who, if he had lived, would've been 117 years old. She would later learn her dad fled Mexico after he fell in love with her mother, who was married at the time to a wealthy banker abusing her while he was working for them as their chef. When she left her husband to be with Ignacio, the banker then threatened to kill Ignacio with a knife, but Ignacio in turn beat the man to death in self-defense (it was later learned the banker was alive). Ignacio's admission could raise consequences for the family if he is deported back to Mexico and in the process could face prison time in that country. It would be through her bribe with Wilhelmina that Betty would get Ignacio back to the United States.

Romantically, the unattached Betty also had to deal with her ex-boyfriend Walter Tabachnik, who dumped her but wanted back in whether she liked it or not. Betty and Walter were once an item and her family thought he would be the person who would marry her, but he dumped her for Gina Gambarro, the Suarez's next door neighbor. When Betty found out Gina used him just to get a TV (which she later broke), Betty decided she wanted nothing to do with Walter, despite Gina's explanation of what happened. However Betty did take him back and was willing to work out their relationship, which was hampered by Betty's family being more supportive of Walter, especially Hilda, who wanted to keep the two together. But that became more difficult after Betty exhibited feelings towards Henry Grubstick, the accountant working at Betty's workplace.

When Betty found out Henry left the message with Hilda during the holidays, she lashed out at Hilda, who said she thought Betty would have her heart broken, but came to realize Betty was capable of making her own decisions. After getting hints her romance was over as evidenced by Ignacio and Claire Meade, Betty finally parted ways with Walter after he decided to take a job as the assistant manager of new Pro-Buy store in Maryland. However, after saying goodbye to Walter and just as she was finally about to ask Henry out now she is a single woman, Henry stuns her by telling her his ex-girlfriend Charlie has come to New York to work things out, thus breaking Betty's heart. As a result of this, Betty told Henry it would be best to remain friends despite their attraction to each other. In Secretaries' Day, a semi-conscious Henry told Betty he loved her. In the following episode, A Tree Grows in Guadalajara, Betty believes she sees Henry in Mexico. She follows the apparition and discovers her grandmother's house. Her grandmother, mistaking Betty for her mother Rosa, encourages her to fight for her love. Betty resolves to fight for Henry.

In the season 1 finale, Betty and Henry seem to be off to a good start in a relationship, when Charlie comes back into the picture, saying she is pregnant with Henry's baby. Henry decides to move with her to Tucson, and he tearfully and regretfully says goodbye to Betty. However, later, while getting a filling done at her dentist, the dental technician blurts out Charlie had been cheating on Henry with Dr. Farkas for two months and urges Betty to go after Henry. This plan, however, is shoved aside when the police show up at her door, telling her Hilda's fiancé, Santos, was killed in a robbery. Betty chooses to go tell Hilda, thus letting Henry go with Charlie to Arizona.

By season two, Henry returns and get his job back in order to support Charlie, which made Betty feel uneasy because was afraid to tell him about Charlie, but at the same still had feelings for him. Despite mixed feelings from Ignacio and Daniel, both Betty and Henry decided to continue their romance for the next five months before Henry returned to Arizona, after he learned that the baby might be his after all. Betty has also attracted the interest of Giovanni "Gio" Rossi, a deli shop owner. This development has resulted in a semi-close relationship, as Hilda and Henry has witnessed, even though Betty has yet to noticed any sparks, believing that she and Gio are just friends. This would put Betty in an unusual predicament. Gio wanted her to travel to Rome with him. Henry wanted her to marry him. In the season 3 opener it is revealed she chose neither Henry or Gio, instead she took a trip across the country to find herself.

After she returns she asserts herself as "more adult" but, she is shocked to see Daniel is Editor-in-Chief of Player magazine, but after she accepted Wilhelmina's offer to work at Mode again, she realizes Daniel wanted his old job again and after she showed him letters from disgruntled readers, he reclaims his job and rehires Betty again.

She decides to get her own apartment but is schmoozed over by a real-estate agent and leases a complete dump of an apartment without ever seeing it. She then deals with her old bully, Kimmie Keegan, as she is now her father's boss. After a fight in the fast-food restaurant in which they work, her and Kimmie make up. Things then begin to look up after her family, initially against it, help her clean-up and renovate her apartment. She then meets Jesse her new neighbor and obviously new love-interest. Things are turned upside-down when Amanda moves in with her due to financial problems. Jesse kisses Amanda on the roof during a party and Betty is hurt until Amanada realizes Betty likes him and says it was only a kiss. Betty and Jesse go out on a date and he only talks about himself so she breaks up with him. Her father had a heart attack and after surgery was fine but Betty was missing everything because she was at a party when Ignacio had his heart attack so she decided to move back home in Queens, leasing the apartment out to Amanda and Marc. Betty joins YETI so she could begin to "go places" in her career and meets a man named Matt Hartley who works for a sports magazine. Betty eventually starts dating Matt and she meets his mother who thinks she is below Matt (Matt's parents are billionaires) but Matt tells his mother that she will just have to deal with it.

Betty tries to take her relationship with Matt to the next level in The Sex Issue episode, but he is avoiding doing so. Betty was distressed until she finds out Matt has a sex problem which he uses to "connect" with others in the past. He made a deal with Helen, his therapist that he wouldn't sleep with someone until he had an emotional connection with them, which is what he thinks he has with Betty. She begins to feel weird about what Matt told her until he assures her she is number 1 and they are seen going into Matt's apartment in the end.

Matt asks Betty to move in with him, and she agrees. However, soon after this Henry returns to New York with his new girlfriend for a few days, and realizes she still has feelings for him. Before Henry's departure from New York, Betty and Henry meet and agree they should go separate ways despite their feelings for each other. They still kiss before Henry leaves. Matt sees this and finally decides to break up with Betty because she wasn't honest with him. He also informs her, she will still be seeing a lot him, because he got a job at MODE as Betty's superior.

In the fourth season, Matt made Betty's life at work a misery as her boss and revealed in Blue On Blue episode that he does that because he couldn't stand seeing Betty happy when he was in so much pain. They got back into a more amicable terms after that. Matt and Betty get back together at the end of "The Bahamas Triangle". In the Christmas episode, Betty and Hilda think they are both pregnant due to a mix-up with the pregnancy tests but in the end, it turns out that Hilda is the one expecting a child. Matt later left for Africa for six months to help the unfortunate after a teary goodbye. Meanwhile, Amanda gives Betty part of the rent she failed to pay after moving out and encourages her to take her apartment back. In Million Dollar Smile, she finally removed her braces. In the episode London Calling, she went to London for Hilda's bachelorette party and met Christina there and she is now a famous fashion designer and wrote a column about London Fashion Week for Mr. Dunne. She then met Mr. Dunne again and he was offering her to be a co-owner of a magazine he is starting. In Hilda's wedding, she accepted the job.

In the series finale, Betty is made aware of Daniel's feelings for her. She also leaves Mode for a job in London where she bumps into Daniel, who tells her that he quit his job as Editor-in-Chief at Mode to find something that he's actually passionate about. He also asks her out. Betty agrees to the date and asks him (playfully) if he needs a job, as she's looking for a new assistant. Daniel tells her that he might submit his résumé and watches Betty as she walks away, thus making it a romantic ending as it is implied they end up together.
