= Silvio Horta =

American television producer and writer (1974-2020)

- Born: August 14, 1974; Miami, Florida, U.S.
- Died: January 7, 2020 (aged 45); Miami, Florida, U.S.
- Education: New York University
- Occupations: Screenwriter; producer
- Years active: 1998–2020
- Notable work: Ugly Betty

Silvio Horta (August 14, 1974 – January 7, 2020) was an American screenwriter and television producer widely noted for adapting the hit Colombian telenovela Yo soy Betty, la fea into the ABC series Ugly Betty. Horta served as head writer and executive producer on the series.

== Background and death ==
Horta, a first-generation Cuban-American, was born and raised in Miami. He was a popular performer and playwright in high school, attending both International Baccalaureate Theater, and Experimental Theater programs at Coral Gables Senior in Miami. After graduating in 1992, he attended the Tisch School of the Arts at New York University, majoring in film. Horta was openly gay, coming out to his family at 19.

He was found dead in a Miami hotel room on January 7, 2020. Variety reported that he died from a self-inflicted gunshot wound. He was 45 years old.

== Career ==
Horta penned many as yet unproduced screenplays including "Even Exchange" and "The Furies" (with Nip/Tuck creator Ryan Murphy). Prior to Ugly Betty, Horta wrote the screenplay for the 1998 teen satirical hit slasher film Urban Legend and he can be heard on the DVD commentary. Before Legend, he was working as a perfume spritzer.

Horta was also creator of two short lived sci-fi television shows Jake 2.0, which starred Christopher Gorham, who would later join the cast of Ugly Betty, and The Chronicle. In 2007, he accepted the Golden Globe for Best Comedy Series Ugly Betty, stating, "Like most of us up here, Betty is an immigrant and The American Dream is alive and well and in reach of anybody who wants it".

Horta started the production company "Silent H Productions", named as a tongue-in-cheek acknowledgement of the common mispronunciation of the silent H in Horta's last name. In 2011, his production company signed a deal with Sony.

== Writing credits ==
Film

- Urban Legend (1997)

Short film

- The Furies (1999)
- Horror Movie: The Movie (2012)

Television

Year	Title	Writer	Executive Producer	Creator	Notes
2001–2002	The Chronicle	Yes	Yes	Yes	22 episodes
2003–2004	Jake 2.0	Yes	Yes	Yes	16 episodes
2006–2010	Ugly Betty	Yes	Yes	Yes	Also developer

TV movies

Year	Title	Writer	Executive Producer
2005	Sold	Yes	Yes
2015	The Curse of the Fuentes Women	Yes	Yes

Consultant

- P-Valley (2020)
