= London Calling (Ugly Betty) =

- Ugly Betty episode
- Episode no.: Season 4 Episode 18
- Directed by: Mark Worthington
- Written by: David Grubstick; Sheila Lawrence
- Production code: 418
- Original air date: 31 March 2010

Guest appearances
- Ashley Jensen as Christina McKinney; Freddy Rodriguez as Gio Rossi; Adam Rodríguez as Bobby Talercio; Neal Bledsoe as Tyler; Ryan McGinnis as Austin; Daniel Gerroll as Lindsay Dunne; Matt Newton as Troy

Episode chronology
← Previous "Million Dollar Smile"	Next → "The Past Presents the Future"
- Ugly Betty season 4

"London Calling" is the 18th episode of the fourth season of the American comedy-drama series Ugly Betty, and the 83rd episode overall. It originally aired on ABC in the United States on March 31, 2010. In this episode, Betty goes to London with Amanda and Hilda, where she meets up with Christina and Gio. Meanwhile, Wilhelmina joins the Alcoholics Anonymous in the hope of getting closer to Tyler.

== Plot ==
Hilda (Ana Ortiz) is planning her wedding, which is getting closer and asks Betty (America Ferrera) about the plans for her bachelorette party. Betty tells her that she has planned a champagne tour of The Met museum, but Hilda and Bobby believe it is a joke and Betty has to think of something else.

At MODE, Tyler asks Claire (Judith Light) about his father, instead of telling him that Cal Hartley rejected him, Claire lies and tells him that she met his father in rehab and the records have been lost. Tyler runs into Betty and she tells him that Daniel (Eric Mabius) will come around eventually. Daniel sees them and asks Betty if she is on "Team Tyler", but she tells him to grow up. Marc (Michael Urie) brings Wilhelmina (Vanessa Williams) some "dressing down" clothes from the mall she will use in order to win Tyler over and make him a pawn in her plan to bring the Meade empire down. Betty talks Daniel out of going to London Fashion Week and decides to take Hilda there for her bachelorette party.

Hilda, Betty and Amanda (Becki Newton) arrive in London and meet up with Christina (Ashley Jensen). Christina tells the group that she recently held a fashion show and is now a famous designer. She introduces Betty to a publisher, who asks her to fill in for a fashion columnist. Betty has to attend fashion shows, so the others go off sight seeing.

When Betty meets up with the girls she finds that they are getting drunk and Betty decides to join in. During a drinking game, Hilda dares Betty to flash a stranger in the bar and she agrees, but the stranger turns out to be Gio (Freddy Rodriguez). He invites Betty to hang out with him for the rest of the night and they leave. During their walk, Gio tells Betty he is engaged and that he thinks MODE has become Betty's path and that she has turned a steppingstone into a career. An offended Betty returns to Hilda.

A hungover Betty goes to her interview and is offered a job as a permanent columnist. However, she turns the job down when she realizes that fashion is not what she wants to write about. Before returning to New York, Betty meets up with Gio and informs him that she turned the job down. They have an amicable talk and Gio assures Betty that she will always have a special place in his heart. When Amanda returns home, she tells Marc that she is leaving MODE to pursue her dream of being a stylist because she was inspired by Christina. A message from a drunk Betty is playing on an answer machine and Henry (Christopher Gorham) is happy to hear that Betty wants him to come to Hilda's wedding as her guest.

Daniel takes Tyler out for the night and apologizes to him. When he mentions that Cal is Tyler's father, Tyler calls Wilhelmina and tells her that he wants a drink. Wilhelmina encourages him to have a drink and Tyler gets drunk and fights with Daniel. Claire gets Daniel from jail and she tells him that Tyler is an alcoholic and that he did not know who his father was. Wilhelmina bails Tyler out and he tells her that he is going to take his share of Meade.

Bobby is annoyed when Justin (Mark Indelicato) turns down a lift to school in favor of walking with Austin and does not want to go to a Beyoncé concert with him. He goes to talk to Justin about his strange behavior and sees Justin and Austin kissing. Justin sees Bobby and asks him not to tell anyone, even his mother.

== Production ==
"London Calling" was written by David Grubstick and Sheila Lawrence and was directed by Mark Worthington. This episode sees the return of three past characters; Gio, Christina and Henry. A montage during the trip to London is set to Little Boots' "New in Town".

This episode also shares its name with an episode of the Mode After Hours series on the official website. Despite the storyline being set in London, the scenes were actually filmed on set in New York.

== Reception ==
"London Calling" posted a decrease in numbers from the previous week, with 4.1 million viewers tuning in.

Tanner Stransky of Entertainment Weekly gave the episode a positive review and said "It seems that the writers are more concerned (and rightfully so!) with doing justice to all the storylines." Caryn Ganz of New York magazine said the episode was "charming" and added "Last night was an action-packed hour of evil schemes and nudges to follow your dreams."
