= The Past Presents the Future (Ugly Betty) =

- Ugly Betty episode
- Episode no.: Season 4 Episode 19
- Directed by: Paul Holahan
- Written by: Jon Kinnaly; Tracy Poust
- Production code: 419
- Original air date: April 7, 2010

Guest appearances
- Bryan Batt as Spencer Cannon; Lauren Velez as Elena; Adam Rodríguez as Bobby Talercio; Neal Bledsoe as Tyler; Ryan McGinnis as Austin; Daniel Gerroll as Lindsay Dunne; Kelli Barrett as Trista; Matt Newton as Troy

Episode chronology
← Previous "London Calling"	Next → "Hello Goodbye"
- Ugly Betty season 4

"The Past Presents the Future" is the 19th and penultimate episode of the fourth season of the American comedy-drama series, Ugly Betty, and the 84th episode overall. It originally aired on ABC in the United States on April 7, 2010.

As Hilda's wedding approaches, Betty asks Daniel to be her guest, Amanda tries to set Marc up with soap opera star Spencer Cannon, Justin wonders whether he can invite Austin, Wilhelmina finds a way to get the Meade empire and Betty gets an unexpected offer in both her personal and professional lives.

== Plot ==
Betty (America Ferrera) invites Daniel (Eric Mabius) to come to her sister Hilda (Ana Ortiz)'s wedding with her and he accepts. While Betty is listening to her messages, she listens to a message from Henry (Christopher Gorham) telling her that he will be happy to come to the wedding as her plus one. Betty then remembers the drunken message she left for him. Betty then bumps into Mr. Dunne who has come to New York to find her and offer her a job of running his new magazine in London. Amanda (Becki Newton), having now quit her job as a receptionist, returns to MODE to take supplies for her meeting with her first client as a stylist, soap opera actor, Spencer Cannon. Justin (Mark Indelicato) arrives to talk to Marc about Bobby seeing him kiss Austin. He is worried that Bobby will tell everyone and he does not want anyone to know yet.

Amanda is getting on well with Spencer and she decides to set him up on a date with Marc (Michael Urie). Marc tells Amanda that he does not want to be set up as he is still getting over Troy. He later changes his mind and Amanda invites Spencer to the wedding. Betty and Henry meet up and he tells her that he has a job interview that means he will be moving back to New York. Betty agrees to have breakfast with him the next day. Hilda asks Bobby why Justin is always going off with Austin, but Bobby tells her that nothing is going on. Hilda then realises that Justin and Austin are a couple. She then calls Betty to tell her that Justin has a boyfriend, Betty goes to her apartment and finds Hilda and Ignacio (Tony Plana) preparing a coming out party for Justin. Marc arrives and tells them that a party is the last thing Justin would want. Quoting passages from a PFLAG brochure, they assure Marc they were only trying to be accepting of Justin's orientation so that he would have a good foundation for future relationships, but Marc persuades them to let Justin come out on his own terms.

On the day of the wedding, Justin brings Austin and Ignacio brings Elena. Henry does not attend the wedding and Daniel arrives dateless, he then tells Betty that she looks great. He gazes at her while Hilda gives a speech about soulmates who know each other better than they know themselves and would do anything to protect them. Betty decides to accept the London job and Justin also takes a big step by leading Austin to the dance floor in front of his proud family. Marc tells Spencer that he is looking for a serious relationship but Spencer tells him that he only came to the wedding to please Amanda. Marc then spots Spencer's Tweety Bird tattoo, a feature matching one of the known details about Amanda's biological father.

Tyler tells Wilhelmina (Vanessa Williams) that she is the only one he can trust and that he just wants his money. He also tells Claire (Judith Light) that he knows the truth about everything, Claire then tells him that she will give him nothing. Claire also goes to confront Wilhelmina and they end up fighting and falling into a pool of water. Wilhelmina realizes that Tyler has taken her gun and goes to warn Claire, but she is too late and Tyler arrives. Wilhelmina then tells them that the situation is all her fault and tries to get Tyler to hand over the gun. Just as he goes to hand it over, the gun goes off.

== Production ==
"The Past Presents the Future" was written by Jon Kinnally and Tracy Poust and was directed by Paul Holahan. It first aired on 7 April 2010 in the United States on ABC. In March 2010, it was announced that former Mad Men star Bryan Batt would be guest starring in the episode as soap opera star Spencer Cannon, a romantic interest for Marc St. James. For the first time, Henry and Charlie's son makes his first physical appearance on the show while former recurring character Elena returns after remaining absent since the third season.

The episode sees teenage Justin finally reveal his feelings and his sexual orientation. For weeks, Justin has been seen struggling with his feelings and then finally allowing himself to like his friend, Austin. Creator Silvio Horta said in a 2007 interview that he did not intentionally set out to create television's first mainstream gay child character, he had just wanted a humorous foil for Betty. Indelicato said of the storyline; "I think the writers have really done this whole transition, this whole discovery, with such grace and in not a cliche way." In an interview with Us Weekly he added "I went into [filming] saying this is history, we're making history now, and I'm so happy that it happened."

== Reception ==
Critical reception of the episode was positive and favorable. Tanner Stransky of Entertainment Weekly called the episode "one of the most precious hours of television ever." Stransky also praised Justin's coming out and said it "warms my heart that this kind of thing is on network television" and "it's for storylines like this that will make Ugly Betty go down in television history."

Maria Elena Fernandez of the Los Angeles Times also praised the handling of Justin revealing his sexuality saying "its restrained execution proves that Ugly Betty still deserves a special place in TV history." Mrs. Northman of television website, TV Fanatic said "Each minute of "The Past Presents the Future" either had us laughing, smiling, holding our breaths, or crying."
