= The Passion of the Betty =

- Ugly Betty episode
- Episode no.: Season 4 Episode 10
- Directed by: S.J. Clarkson
- Written by: David Grubstick; Chris Black
- Production code: 410
- Original air date: January 6, 2010

Guest appearances
- Jesse Tyler Ferguson as Dr. Farkas; Christine Ebersole as Frances; Nadia Dajani as Denise Ludwig; Alec Mapa as Suzuki St. Pierre; David Rasche as Calvin Hartley; Adam Rodríguez as Bobby Talercio; Matt Newton as Troy

Episode chronology
← Previous "Be-Shure"	Next → "Back in Her Place"
- Ugly Betty season 4

"The Passion of the Betty" is tenth episode of the fourth season of the American comedy-drama series, Ugly Betty, and the 75th episode overall. It originally aired on ABC in the United States on January 6, 2010.

== Plot ==
Betty is concerned that she and Matt are spending too much time together; with them always going to work together and sleeping at Matt's apartment, and Hilda is unsure when to tell Bobby about her pregnancy. In an attempt to have some privacy, Betty gives Matt tickets to a hockey game, only for him to skip the game and surprise her at a late photo shoot, which worries her. Recalling Matt going to art classes, Betty meets with an art gallery curator, Frances, about having Matt's paintings displayed. Frances sees Matt's paintings but refuses to showcase them, saying that there is not enough "energy" in them. When Matt appears, Betty stalls him so she can continue her meeting with Frances. Frances finds some artworks good enough to showcase and Betty agrees without seeing them.

Betty and Matt arrive at the art gallery, despite Matt insisting that they go home, and both are shocked to see the paintings are all of Betty, which Matt painted when they were broken up. Matt is furious that Betty publicized his personal paintings and says that she is not passionate enough for him. Meanwhile, Hilda sees Bobby exchanging money with a policeman and confronts him, during which she reveals that she is pregnant with his child.

The next morning, Betty and Hilda talk about their relationships, and when Betty brings up the subject of her not being passionate enough, Hilda admits to Betty that she read her diary and says that Betty draws her passion from what she writes down. Bobby arrives to see Hilda, pledging to stand by her during her pregnancy, and they reconcile. Betty later shows Matt her diary, which talks about how Matt tortured Betty after their first break-up. Matt apologizes and decides to quit MODE in order to keep the balance in their relationship.

Meanwhile, Daniel, Wilhelmina and Marc plot to oust Denise Ludwig, Wilhelmina's replacement. Daniel asks Denise to give an interview to Suzuki St. Pierre, but during the interview, Denise talks around the questions. During a break, Denise tells Daniel fashion is a just a waste of time and Marc records her words. Suzuki later reveals Denise's secret interview with Daniel on Fashion TV and Claire and Cal Hartley see it. Wilhelmina arrives and tells Claire and Cal that the best replacement for Denise is herself. Claire is angry that Daniel teamed up with Wilhelmina.

Wilhelmina overhears Amanda talking about Claire's visit to South Dakota to meet her adopted son, Tyler. She then bribes Amanda into telling her about Claire's son. Cal confronts Claire about their son, angry that she did not tell him about Tyler, which ultimately makes Claire decides to fire him. Claire confronts Wilhelmina about Tyler's documents, but Wilhelmina insists that she did not give them to Cal. She leaves after Claire orders her not to tell Daniel about Tyler.

Meanwhile, Marc is horrified that his one-night stand, Troy, is falling for him, since Marc was Troy's "first". He then tries to avoid Troy at all costs and tries to break up with him, but when Troy cuts him off and tells him his true feelings about their relationship, Marc then changes his mind.

== Production ==
This was the first episode in the series to air on Wednesday, as ABC announced on December 1, 2009, that it was moving Ugly Betty to Wednesday nights starting on January 6, 2010.

== Reception ==
Tanner Stransky of Entertainment Weekly called "The Passion of the Betty" "yet another fantastic episode...full of "hilarious one-liners".

== Ratings ==
The move to Wednesday gave the show another resurgence, as it posted a 3.5/6 overall with 5.1 million viewers tuning in, an increase from the previous episode.
