= Hello Goodbye (Ugly Betty) =

- Ugly Betty episode
- Episode no.: Season 4 Episode 20
- Directed by: Victor Nelli, Jr.
- Written by: Silvio Horta
- Production code: 420
- Original air date: April 14, 2010

Guest appearances
- Bryan Batt as Spencer Cannon; Neal Bledsoe as Tyler; Grant Bowler as Connor Owens; Alec Mapa as Suzuki St. Pierre; Ryan McGinnis as Austin; Matt Newton as Troy; Adam Rodríguez as Bobby Talercio

Episode chronology
← Previous "The Past Presents the Future"	Next → —
- Ugly Betty season 4

"Hello Goodbye" is the series finale of the television comedy-drama series, Ugly Betty. The episode serves as the 20th and final episode of the fourth season. It was written by series creator and executive producer Silvio Horta, and was directed by Victor Nelli, Jr. It first aired on ABC in the United States on April 14, 2010. Guest stars in this episode include Bryan Batt, Neal Bledsoe, Grant Bowler, Alec Mapa, Ryan McGinnis, Matt Newton and Adam Rodríguez.

The episode focuses on Betty Suarez (America Ferrera) struggling to tell her friend and boss, Daniel Meade (Eric Mabius) about her new job in London. At the same time, Betty's sister, Hilda (Ana Ortiz) tries to keep their father from finding out she is moving to Manhattan. Wilhelmina Slater (Vanessa Williams) recovers from being shot by Tyler (Neal Bledsoe) and Amanda Tanen (Becki Newton) finally finds her father.

"Hello Goodbye" has received critical acclaim from television critics. According to the Nielsen ratings system, the episode was watched by 5.43 million viewers during its original broadcast, which was a season high. It received a 1.8 rating/5 share among viewers in the 18–49 demographic.

== Plot ==
Betty Suarez worries about her boss Daniel Meade's reaction to the news that she is leaving fashion magazine MODE for a new job in London. Marc St. James (Michael Urie) overhears Betty talking about her new job and sends a mass text to everyone in the building, including Daniel. Daniel tells Betty that he is fine with her leaving, however, he later burns her contract release form, angered and saddened by her departure. He then offers Betty a promotion, which she turns down, and he does not come to her farewell party, where Marc gets back together with Troy (Matt Newton) and Amanda Tanen finds out that Spencer Cannon (Bryan Batt) is her father; he reveals that he knew she was his daughter when he hired her to be his stylist. Betty's sister Hilda Suarez and her husband Bobby (Adam Rodríguez) look for an apartment in Manhattan, but Hilda worries that their father Ignacio Suarez will be lonely without them, but Ignacio reassures them that he is happy to live alone.

Meanwhile, MODE co-editor Wilhelmina Slater is in a coma after being accidentally shot by Tyler Meade-Hartley. When she wakes up, her boyfriend Connor Owens (Grant Bowler) visits her on a day release from prison and tells her that he cannot live without her. Daniel and Tyler's mother Claire Meade (Judith Light) offers Wilhelmina a bribe not to reveal that Tyler shot her, but Wilhelmina rejects Claire's bribe and plans to stake her claim on the company, prompting Marc to tell her she will never be happy. Wilhelmina holds a press conference, where she states that she accidentally shot herself. Claire thanks her and Wilhelmina tells her that they are now good. Daniel informs Wilhelmina that he is stepping down as co-editor of MODE, leaving her in charge and planning to start over. Wilhelmina promotes Marc to Creative Director and plots to get Connor's prison sentence reduced.

After saying goodbye to her family, Betty is shown enjoying her new life in London. She meets Daniel in Trafalgar Square, where he apologizes to her for not saying goodbye, and asks her out to dinner. Betty jokingly asks if he needs something to do, she is looking for a new assistant and Daniel tells her that he might submit his resume. As Betty heads off to work, the series title is superimposed onto the scene; after a moment, Ugly disappears.

== Production ==
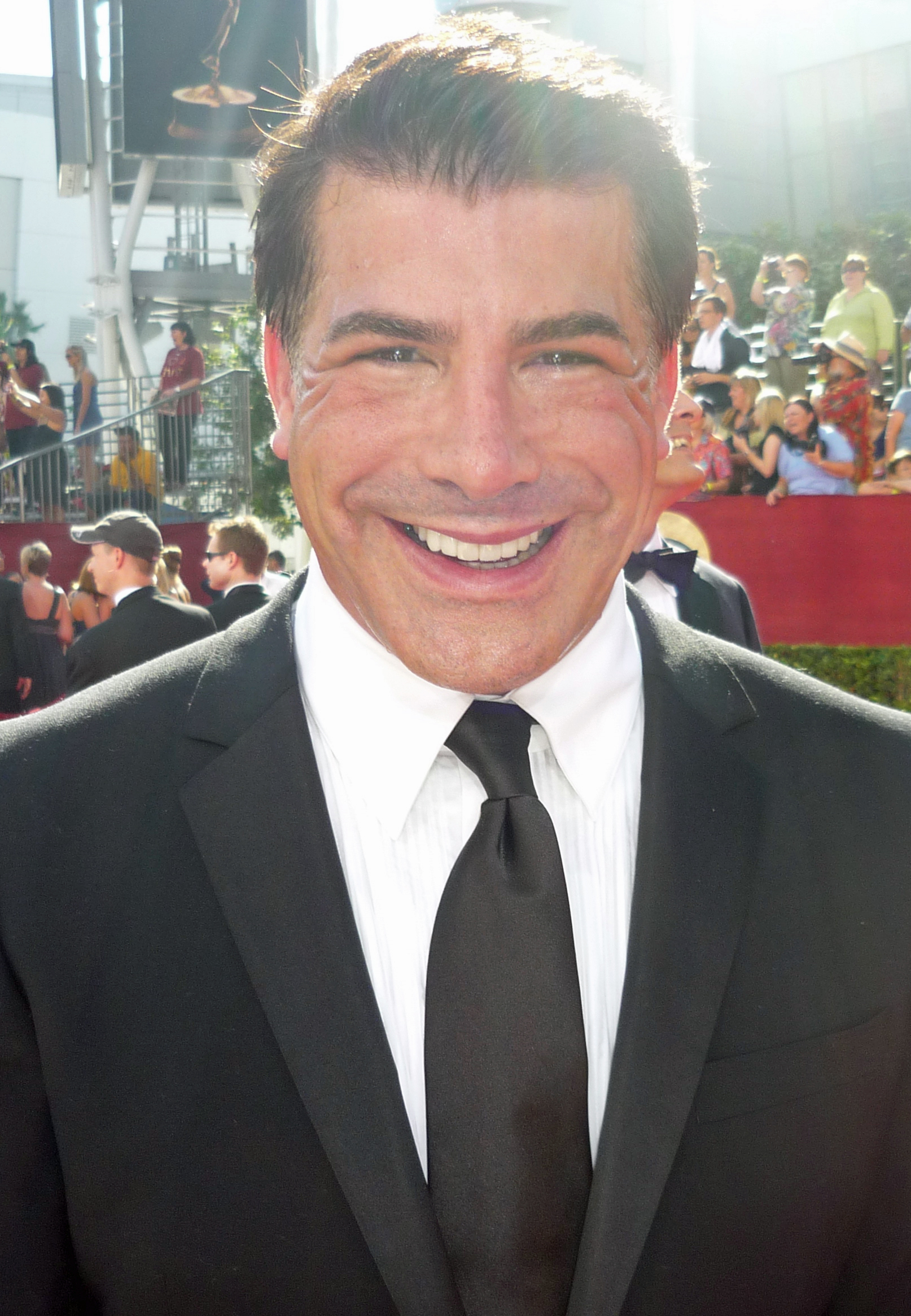
Bryan Batt guest stars as soap opera star Spencer Cannon.

"Hello Goodbye" was written by Ugly Betty creator and executive producer Silvio Horta and directed by Victor Nelli Jr. The episode originally aired on April 14, 2010, on ABC as the twentieth episode of the series' fourth season and 85th overall.

This episode marks the end of Ugly Betty. ABC announced in January 2010 that the series' fourth season was to be the last, following falling ratings. In a joint statement Silvio Horta and ABC Entertainment president Steve McPherson said "We've mutually come to the difficult decision to make this Ugly Betty's final season." The network cut the episode order from 22 to 20, but gave the writers enough time to create a satisfying conclusion that was to air on April 14. On what he was set out to accomplish with the series finale, Horta said "Primarily, I wanted it to be about Betty's journey, about Betty making it in her professional life, first and foremost, overcoming the obstacles in her past and really succeeding". Vanessa Williams said the cancellation of Ugly Betty was "devastating" for the cast. She said "Our cast was one of those rare opportunities where we love each other. It was a real shocker, and really devastating when it all ended".

For the final scenes of the episode, the cast and crew travelled to London to film around a variety of the city's landmarks. This episode featured a guest appearance from former Mad Men star Bryan Batt, who continued his role as soap opera star Spencer Cannon from the previous episode. It was announced in March 2010 that Batt would star in the final season of Ugly Betty, as a potential love interest for Marc St. James (Michael Urie). Batt is the second Mad Men actor to appear in the final season of the series, following Rich Sommer's appearance in "Fire and Nice".

== Reception ==
According to the Nielsen ratings, "Hello Goodbye" was viewed by 5.43 million viewers upon its original broadcast in the United States. This was an increase of 29 percent from the previous episode, "The Past Presents the Future", which was watched by 4.0 million American viewers. It earned a 1.8 rating/5 share in the 18–49 demographic. This means that it was seen by 1.8 percent of all 18- to 49-year-olds and 5 percent of all 18- to 49-year-olds watching television at the time of the broadcast. "Hello Goodbye" became the highest viewed episode of the season and number one in its hour.

Since airing, the episode has received critical acclaim. Tanner Stransky of Entertainment Weekly praised the episode calling it "A super-sweet end to a super-sweet series!" Mrs. Northman of television website, TV Fanatic said "Overall, "Hello Goodbye" did wrap up each of our beloved characters lives in a nice pretty bow", they added "We wanted MORE!" However, some critics felt the ending of the episode was not enough. Mark A. Perigard of the Boston Herald gave the episode a mixed review saying it was "like one long hug with loved ones you don't want to leave," but added the conclusion was "unsatisfying". New York magazine said "The cast of Ugly Betty damn well earned a happy ending — and that's exactly what creator Silvio Horta gave them last night on the series finale". However, they also found the conclusion to be unsatisfying saying "The one-hour finale easily could have been longer, meaning some plotlines went unresolved." Jarett Wieselman of the New York Post said "Last night, Ugly Betty attempted to earn a place in TV history, but I fear their last episode will be quickly forgotten by the fans". Wieselman also added "On a show that always favored high drama and cool camp, I was saddened to see everyone get such an expected ending". Wieselman, however, did enjoy the final scene calling it "pitch-perfect".
