= Million Dollar Smile =

- Ugly Betty episode
- Episode no.: Season 4 Episode 17
- Directed by: Paul Holahan
- Written by: Henry Alonso Myers; Chris Black
- Production code: 417
- Original air date: March 24, 2010

Guest appearances
- Neal Bledsoe as Tyler; Halley Feiffer as Allison; Ryan McGinnis as Austin; Donna Murphy as Eve; Kathy Najimy as Dr. Frankel

Episode chronology
← Previous "All the World's a Stage"	Next → "London Calling"
- Ugly Betty season 4

"Million Dollar Smile" is the 17th episode of the fourth season of the American television comedy series, Ugly Betty, and the 82nd overall episode of the series. It was written by Henry Alonso Myers and Chris Black. The episode was directed by Paul Holahan. It originally aired on the ABC network in the United States on March 24, 2010. Guest stars in this episode include Neal Bledsoe, Halley Feiffer, Ryan McGinnis, Donna Murphy and Kathy Najimy.

In the episode, Betty Suarez (America Ferrera) finally has her braces removed, but only after she enters a dream sequence in which she sees what her life would be like if she had had perfect teeth. At the same time, Justin Suarez (Mark Indelicato) tries to contact Austin (Ryan McGinnis), who he kissed in the previous episode and Daniel Meade (Eric Mabius) secures the Million Dollar Bra for a MODE cover shoot. Meanwhile, Amanda Tanen (Becki Newton) reveals that her relationship with Tyler (Neal Bledsoe) is getting serious.

According to the Nielsen ratings system, the episode was watched by 4.63 million households during its original broadcast, and received a 1.7 rating/5 share among viewers in the 18–49 demographic.

== Plot ==
Betty (America Ferrera) wakes up in a good mood as she is finally having her braces removed and can get her first ID picture without them. At her orthodontist's office, Betty tries to hurry along Dr. Frankel (Kathy Najimy) and just as she stops her from talking, the fire alarm goes off. At MODE, Betty is depressed that her braces have not been removed, so Marc (Michael Urie) photoshops her image into a blond haired and braceless woman on her ID.

Justin (Mark Indelicato) tries repeatedly to call Austin who seems to be hiding from him after they kissed. Claire (Judith Light) has come back from France and Daniel (Eric Mabius) is cold towards her as she lied to him about Tyler. Meanwhile, Amanda (Becki Newton) lets Tyler sleep over for the night after their dinner date due to him being jet lagged from the flight. After Tyler kisses her for the first time the next morning, Amanda later tells Daniel that she is getting serious with Tyler and Daniel tells her to leave. At the editors meeting, Daniel announces that he has secured the "Million Dollar Bra" for a cover shoot. Wilhelmina (Vanessa Williams) is surprised that Daniel's done something right for a change, until she reads the itinerary for the bra and tells Daniel that the Bra is due to be shipped to Cairo at the same time as the shoot.

Betty tells Daniel she will contact her friend, Alison, who works for Eve, the president of the company that owns the Bra. Betty goes to the Guggenheim Museum to meet Alison, but is stopped by security and when she produces her ID, the security man does not believe it is her. Her braces then set off the metal detector and when she calls out Allison's nickname, A-Bomb, she gets tackled to the ground by security and hits her head. When she wakes up, Betty finds that she is in an It's a Wonderful Life-type dream sequence where is she beautiful and rich. She no longer has braces and is working at MODE as Wilhelmina's right hand woman. Dr. Frankel is her guardian angel and explains that because she had perfect teeth, everything is different. Hilda (Ana Ortiz) is the ugly sister, Justin was never born, Ignacio gambles and Daniel and Amanda are married. When Betty finds out that she and Wilhelmina had planned to sabotage the "Million Dollar Bra" shoot, Betty tries to change the course of events, but ends up hitting her head again. She wakes up to find herself back in the real world and thinking Wilhelmina is going to steal the Bra, Betty rips off Wilhelmina's shirt before backing into the Bra and getting her braces stuck to it. Dr. Frankel then arrives and removes Betty's braces.

Daniel apologizes to Amanda and says he is okay with her and Tyler's relationship. Tyler sees them hug and confronts Amanda, who tells him that Daniel has given them his blessing. Tyler is not happy and Amanda tells him they need some time apart until Tyler and Daniel work on their issues with each other. Back at the Suarez house, Betty is celebrating with her family and eating the foods that she could not eat before with her braces. The doorbell rings and Justin opens the door and finds Austin standing there.

== Production ==
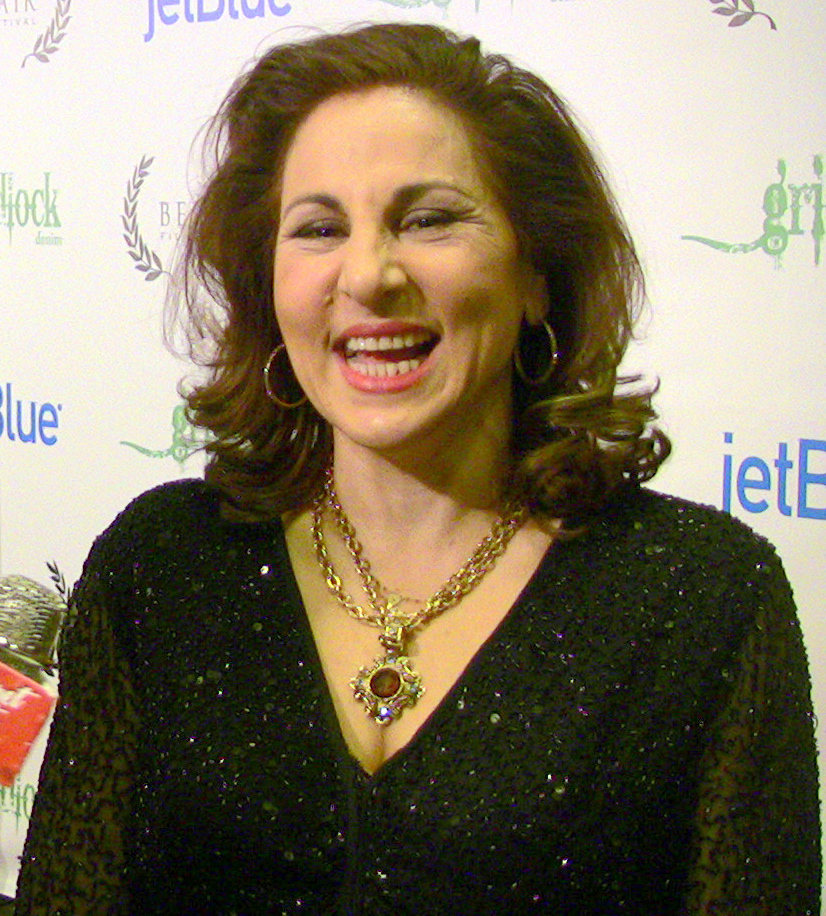
Kathy Najimy guest stars as Betty's orthodontist and guardian angel.

"Million Dollar Smile" was directed by Paul Holahan, and written by executive producer Henry Alonso Myers and co-executive producer Chris Black. The episode originally aired on ABC in the United States on March 24, 2010, as the seventeenth episode of the show's fourth season and the 82nd overall episode of the series.

During "Million Dollar Smile", Betty finally has her "over-exaggerated" train-track braces removed after three seasons. In April 2009, series creator Silvio Horta told Michael Ausiello of Entertainment Weekly, that Betty's braces would be removed by the end of the fourth season. He explained "Next year, there’s going to be a progression in her look overall. It’ll still be Betty, but you’ll see some growth in that direction." Following the series' cancellation, it was announced that Betty was to undergo a make over and her braces were to be removed during "Million Dollar Smile". Broadway theatre actress Kathy Najimy joined the cast of Ugly Betty in February 2010, as the orthodontist who would be removing Betty's braces. Najimy's role would also see her act as Betty's guardian angel during a dream sequence. Najimy succeeded Jesse Tyler Ferguson, who played Betty’s first orthodontist, Gabe Farkas, in season 1.

Donna Murphy appeared in this episode as Eve, an "ice queen lingerie executive." Other guest stars included Halley Feiffer as Betty's friend, Allison, Ryan McGinnis as Austin and Neal Bledsoe in his ongoing role of Tyler.

== Reception ==
In its original American broadcast, "Million Dollar Smile" was watched by 4.63 million households, according to the Nielsen ratings system. It received a 1.7 rating/5 share among viewers in the 18–49 demographic, meaning that 1.7 percent of all people in that group, and 5 percent of all people from that group watching television at the time, watched the episode. This was an increase from the previous episode, "All the World's a Stage", which was watched by 3.3 million American viewers.

Television website TV Fanatic said the episode "was entirely far fetched, but, it was highly entertaining nonetheless". The website also praised how the writers marked Betty's braces being removed, saying "job well done". Tanner Stransky from Entertainment Weekly called "Million Dollar Smile" "a stunning episode" and added that it was "truly heartwarming". However, New York magazine called the dream sequence "a downer" and labelled it "downright uncomfortable".
