= Ugly Betty season 4 =

Ugly Betty
- Season 4
- DVD cover
- No. of episodes: 20

Release
- Original network: ABC
- Original release: October 16, 2009 – April 14, 2010

Season chronology
- ← Previous; Season 3

The fourth and final season of the American comedy-drama television series Ugly Betty was picked up for a full season on April 23, 2009. The season premiered on October 16, 2009 and ended with the series finale on April 14, 2010.

Outside the United States, Season 4 began airing on digital channel 7TWO on April 13, 2010, in Australia, and on August 11, 2010, on E4 and Channel 4 in the UK.

The season had been shifted to the Friday night death slot and ratings for the first 8 episodes were extremely low (especially the seventh which became the all-time lowest rated episode). On December 2, 2009, ABC confirmed that Ugly Betty would be moving to Wednesday nights after Christmas 2009, due to Eastwick's cancellation. However, ratings did not improve and ABC lowered the episode count from an original 22 to 20. On January 27, 2010, ABC announced the show would not be brought back for a fifth season.

== Cast ==
Most of the main cast from the show's third season returned for the fourth season, with the exception of Ashley Jensen. Daniel Eric Gold was promoted to the main cast as Matt Hartley, having appeared in a recurring capacity during Season 3.

Yaya DaCosta took over the recurring role of Nico Slater, who was played in the first season by Jowharah Jones.

The fourth season saw guest appearances by the brothers of two of the show's stars. Becki Newton's brother Matt Newton took on the recurring role of Marc's new boyfriend Troy, and Vanessa Williams's brother Chris Williams played drag queen "Wilheldiva Hater".

=== Main Cast ===
- America Ferrera as Betty Suarez
- Vanessa L. Williams as Wilhelmina Slater
- Eric Mabius as Daniel Meade
- Judith Light as Claire Meade
- Michael Urie as Marc St. James
- Becki Newton as Amanda Tanen
- Ana Ortiz as Hilda Suarez
- Tony Plana as Ignacio Suarez
- Mark Indelicato as Justin Suarez
- Daniel Eric Gold as Matt Hartley (episodes 1-11)

=== Recurring Cast ===
- Dylan Baker as Bennett Wallis
- Neal Bledsoe as Tyler Venton
- Grant Bowler as Connor Owens
- Smith Cho as Megan
- Yaya DaCosta as Nico Slater
- Kristen Johnston as Helen
- Ralph Macchio as Councilman Archie Rodriguez
- Alec Mapa as Suzuki St. Pierre
- Piter Marek as Jonathan Vieja
- Ryan McGinnis as Austin Marley
- Matt Newton as Troy
- David Rasche as Calvin Hartley
- Adam Rodriguez as Bobby Talercio
- Jamie-Lynn Sigler as Natalie

=== Guest Cast ===
- Christie Brinkley as Penelope Graybridge
- Brooklyn Decker as Lexie
- Christine Ebersole as Frances
- Tovah Feldshuh as Mrs. Varner
- Jesse Tyler Ferguson as Dr. Gabe Farkus
- Christopher Gorham as Henry Grubstick
- Dana Ivey as Roberta
- Ashley Jensen as Christina McKinney
- Carol Kane as Lena Korvinka
- Lainie Kazan as Dina Talercio
- Sarah Lafleur as Molly Meade
- Hamish Linklater as Evan Grant
- Brian Stokes Mitchell as Donald Jones
- Donna Murphy as Eve
- Kathy Najimy as Dr. Frankel
- Lynn Redgrave as Olivia Guillemette
- Freddy Rodriguez as Giovanni ‘Gio’ Rossi
- RuPaul as Rudolph
- Rich Sommer as Jimmy Wilson
- Fisher Stevens as Mr. Z
- Aaron Tveit as Zachary Boule
- Lauren Vélez as Elena Sanchez
- Chris Williams as Wilheldiva Hater

In addition, the final season featured cameo appearances by singer Shakira, designer Brian Reyes, and drag queens Varla Jean Merman, Candi Shell, and Hedda Lettuce as themselves.

== Episodes ==
No. overall	No. in season	Title	Directed by	Written by	Original release date	U.S. viewers (millions)
66	1	"The Butterfly Effect"	John Terlesky	Sheila Lawrence & Henry Alonso Myers	October 16, 2009	5.01
67	2	"The Butterfly Effect"	Victor Nelli, Jr.	Sheila Lawrence & Henry Alonso Myers	October 16, 2009	5.18
Part 1: Betty finds that everything is changing as she begins her new job as associate features editor, especially since her boss is her ex-boyfriend, Matt Hartley, who is still unhappy about their breakup. In addition, Betty's new officemate Megan openly resents her, while Marc is constantly undermining her because he felt he was more deserving of the promotion. Meanwhile, without Betty as his assistant, Daniel is adrift, still mourning the loss of his wife, Molly. Justin starts high school and is victimized by bullies but won't tell his mom, Hilda. Claire Meade is finding that her power struggle at the company has her sitting pretty – for the moment – opposite Wilhelmina, who lost her claim to the Meade throne last season. But Wilhelmina has perhaps an even bigger problem than job security – she is harboring a secret at home that is driving Marc to distraction. Part 2: After managing to turn her first editorial pitch into fruition, Betty struggles to balance her time between working on her United Nations photoshoot and helping Daniel cope with his loneliness under extremely short notice. When she fails at multi-tasking and as more is thrown upon her and Daniel, Betty decides to transform into a more fashionable and focused woman, causing people to slowly start accepting her. Finding out that Justin has been talking to Marc about his troubles and not her, Hilda bans him from talking to Marc again which causes their relationship to turn rocky. Wilhelmina struggles to keep her secret safe when Marc manages to find out as well as her concern for her job at Mode.
68	3	"Blue on Blue"	Victor Nelli, Jr	Abraham Higginbotham	October 23, 2009	4.55
Worrying that Matt will fire her both professionally and personally, Betty gets her big break concerning the sudden announcement of Gucci's new designer, Evan York (Hamish Linklater), with the help of Hilda's connected customer, Sammy (Adam Ferrara). But Marc plots to sabotage her, enlisting a clueless Amanda and Matt in his efforts, culminating in a showdown at the restaurant where Ignacio works. Meanwhile Daniel begins to attend a bereavement group, where he meets Natalie (Jamie-Lynn Sigler), an eccentric girl who takes him out for an interesting night on the town, and Wilhelmina flies to Bermuda when she learns Connor may be there and when she meets him face-to-face, she gets torn between her real feelings for him and the fact that he almost endangered her job at Mode.
69	4	"The Weiner, the Bun, and the Boob"	Wendey Stanzler	Brian Tanen	October 30, 2009	4.50
Betty is overwhelmed with her editorial work, so Wilhelmina assigns Marc to be Betty's temporary assistant. Betty's story idea to cover the worst jobs in New York goes south when she has to dress up as a hot dog and do a Bollywood dance number. Meanwhile, Marc frets that he'll never be taken seriously by his idol at Vogue magazine, Hilda gets Archie's campaign in trouble, Daniel hires a gorgeous but inept assistant (supermodel Brooklyn Decker), and Natalie introduces Daniel to the Community – a group whose charismatic leader (Dylan Baker) zeroes in on Daniel.
70	5	"Plus None"	Paul Holahan	Cara DiPaolo	November 6, 2009	4.76
Wilhelmina is furious with Marc who secretly signs her up for a fund-raiser for Tibetan orphans but what makes matters worse is that the party will take place in her apartment, knowing that this could endanger Nico's safety but the truth behind Nico's dire straits is revealed. Betty tries to reconnect with Matt but is immediately saddened when Matt asks Amanda to be his "plus one" at Wilhelmina's fund-raiser but he shocks both her and Betty when they see Matt bringing in someone else. Daniel hires his new BFF Natalie as his assistant, making Betty feel obsolete. Amanda keeps a secret from Betty, and Daniel discovers that his mother, Claire, has history with Cal Hartley.
71	6	"Backseat Betty"	John Putch	Tracy Poust & Jon Kinnally	November 13, 2009	4.46
Hilda's badboy high school flame and Betty's schoolgirl crush, Bobby Talercio (Adam Rodriguez), teaches at Justin's school, causing the sisters to both doubt their feelings for "nice guys". Justin is struggling to fit in at high school, so Marc advises him to befriend the mean girl type cheerleaders. When Justin is invited to Homecoming, he becomes the victim of another prank as he is jokingly awarded as "Homecoming Queen" but Justin takes Marc's advice and manages to turn the prank back at his bullies. Meanwhile Daniel introduces Amanda to the Community of the Phoenix, as he's lured deeper into its clutches by the leader, Bennett (Dylan Baker) and his teammate Natalie. Wilhelmina takes a drastic step to find money for Nico's blackmail payment but when she finds out that Connor is dead, she cries, knowing that her life is slowly shutting down.
72	7	"Level (7) with Me"	John Fortenberry	Chris Black	November 27, 2009	3.39
Daniel lets the leaders from the Community of the Phoenix to take over and control Mode, and Bennett's promise on Daniel's reuniting with his dead wife prompt Betty to action. She schemes with Claire and with an ingenious plan and finding unlikely allies in Matt and Amanda, the four stage a rescue attempt. Saddened by Connor's recent death and trouble surrounding Nico's blackmailing, Wilhelmina has let herself go, wearing sweats and garden clogs in public, prompting a tabloid feeding frenzy and forcing Marc to try to get her back in the fashion world, resulting in slapping some sense into her and inadvertently finds out the truth of Nico's mystery.
73	8	"The Bahamas Triangle"	Victor Neili, Jr.	Sheila Lawrence	December 4, 2009	4.23
In the steamy Bahamas, the love triangle between Betty, Matt and Amanda explodes, and romantic pairings abound. Things should be dreamy at the Atlantis resort, where even Shakira (portraying herself) is staying. Betty finally discovers that Matt is into Amanda. Saddened that it's her last shoot in the Bahamas, Willie tries to find another job but learns her nemesis, Penelope Graybridge (Christie Brinkley), snagged it, and, even more importantly, discovers Connor is very much alive. Marc frets that there is no one on the island for him, but then meets the uber-hot Troy (portrayed by Matt Newton), and back home, Hilda draws closer to her old love, Bobby.
74	9	"Be-Shure"	David Dworetzky	Gail Lerner	December 11, 2009	4.80
Against the backdrop of Ignacio's multi-culti holiday dinner that he prepares for his new flame Jean (Faith Prince), who is Jewish, Betty and Hilda have pregnancy scares. Worse, they purchase their Be-Shure instant pregnancy tests from the local pharmacy – where Jean works and Ignacio is shopping. Meanwhile, Hartley installs Willie's replacement, a clueless Hollywood mogul, Denise Ludwig (Nadia Dajani), whose claim to fame is a tacky movie, but Marc has a plan to get Willie back – if only Daniel will agree. And Claire gets Amanda's help and tracks down Tyler (Neal Bledsoe), the son she long ago gave up for adoption.
75	10	"The Passion of the Betty"	S.J. Clarkson	David Grubstick & Chris Black	January 6, 2010	5.13
When Betty becomes concerned that she and Matt are spending too much time together, she tries to give him something else to be passionate about – a surprise gallery showing of his art work – with unintended results. Meanwhile, Marc is horrified that his one-night stand, Troy, is falling for him, since Marc was Troy's "first", Hilda grapples with whether or not to tell Bobby that he's the father of her unborn child, and Cal officially replaces Wilhelmina with Denise. Jesse Tyler Ferguson returns as Betty's orthodontist, Dr. Farkas, for a cameo, and Christine Ebersole guest stars as Frances, the gallery owner.
76	11	"Back in Her Place"	Richard Heus	Abraham Higginbotham	January 13, 2010	4.67
A battered but unbowed Betty recounts her worst week EVER to Mr. Z (guest star Fisher Stevens) as the show flashes back to her horrible last few days. Frustrated over the frivolous assignments Wilhelmina gives her at Mode, and inspired by Audrey Hepburn's memoir, Betty creates her own blog about amazing charitable ventures that inspire her. As her hobby enriches her, her job is nearly killing her, since Wilhelmina tortures Betty with beauty experiments for future stories. Betty is also upset when Matt tells her that he will be participating in a 6-month trip in Africa. Meanwhile, Daniel fears Marc is sabotaging him while Bobby treats a hormonal Hilda to some pampering during "Hilda Week", which goes awry, and Wilhelmina makes a long-term commitment to the incarcerated Connor.
77	12	"Blackout!"	John Putch	Cara DiPaolo	January 20, 2010	4.59
Betty tries to be neighborly by planning a karaoke party in her apartment building, but before the big day, her building is robbed, and it's partly her fault. Marc is distraught since he lost something irreplaceable in the theft. Meanwhile, Daniel and Wilhelmina are back to being at each other's throats, so Amanda tricks them into attending couples counseling with Dr. Sparks (Frank Whaley), and Ignacio refuses to accept Bobby in Hilda's life. Then a citywide blackout ups the ante for everyone.
78	13	"Chica and the Man"	Victor Nelli, Jr.	Gail Lerner	February 3, 2010	4.34
Wilhelmina is furious when she discovers she has a drag queen impersonator – Wilhediva Hater (portrayed by Vanessa Williams's brother, Chris Williams). The fur flies with unexpected results amid guest stars who include RuPaul Charles as Rudolph, the emcee of the cabaret. Meanwhile Betty receives an award for her blog, which causes tension between her and Daniel. When she vents online, her fans in blogosphere escalate the feud, and the press hounds Daniel. Amanda rehires Helen (Kristen Johnston), but Willie orders Amanda to fire her – which Amanda just can't bring herself to do. And Marc runs his own photo shoot with a famous director (played by Carlos Leon)
79	14	"Smokin' Hot"	John Scott	Brian Tanen	February 10, 2010	4.68
Wilhelmina marginalizes Betty during Fashion Week but Daniel intercedes, and she's assigned to cover a low-priority show. There, she discovers a new designer, Marisa, whom she promotes as one of the 10 Designers to Watch, but Marc steals all her thunder. Meanwhile, Amanda is impressed by Helen's sewing skills and teams up with her to start a new line, but cannot convince Marc or Betty to lobby Wilhelmina on her behalf. Claire's son Tyler comes to New York to find her, and Daniel gets seduced into modeling. The fashion and the feelings are smoking hot, but the real flames are at the Suarez home, which mysteriously catches fire leaving peril and destruction behind.
80	15	"Fire and Nice"	John Terlesky	Erika Johnson	March 10, 2010	4.10
To speed along the investigation into her house fire, Betty is pressured to date an annoying fireman, Jimmy (Rich Sommer). Wilhelmina tries to prove to Don (Brian Stokes Mitchell), an old flame from her past, that she's just "Wanda from the block" instead of dumb. Amanda draws closer to Tyler, convincing Claire to hire him as an in-house model at Mode. Meanwhile, Hilda meets Bobby's parents for the first time (Lainie Kazan and Nestor Serrano).
81	16	"All the World's a Stage"	Andy Wolk	Abraham Higginbotham & David Grubstick	March 17, 2010	3.33
Justin loves his acting class, helmed by the eccentric Lena Korvinka (Carol Kane), and finds himself in an unexpected triangle with his new pals, Austin (Ryan McGinnis) and Lily. When Betty drops by class, she's smitten with a cool young playwright, Zachary (Aaron Tveit), whom she will profile for Mode. But she challenges her own ethics when she starts dating him. And Wilhelmina is hospitalized with a perforated ulcer, and can't help her type-A personality even when bedridden, but then her roommate, Roberta (Dana Ivey), prompts an epiphany.
82	17	"Million Dollar Smile"	Paul Holahan	Henry Alonso Myers & Chris Black	March 24, 2010	4.56
Betty is thrilled to get her braces off, courtesy of her chatty new orthodontist, Dr. Frankel (Kathy Najimy). But before this can happen, she gets knocked unconscious at a photo shoot of the "Million Dollar Bra" at the Guggenheim, spinning her into a dream sequence. An angelic Dr. Frankel shows her how different her life would have been had she never worn braces. She's the "pretty sister", while Hilda is homely, Ignacio is a compulsive gambler, Marc is a doting dad and Amanda is married to Daniel. But glam Betty is also mean – she's in cahoots with Wilhelmina to terrify and overpower everyone at Mode.
83	18	"London Calling"	Mark Worthington	David Grubstick & Sheila Lawrence	March 31, 2010	4.01
Betty gets an assignment to cover London Fashion Week, accompanied by Amanda, and she brings Hilda along as a bachelorette party treat. She reconnects with Christina (Ashley Jensen) and also runs into Gio (Freddy Rodriguez) whilst thinking he was someone else & showing off her 'flags'. Willie joins AA to get closer to Tyler and to double-cross Claire and Daniel, and Bobby can't figure out why Justin is spending all his time with Austin.
84	19	"The Past Presents the Future"	Paul Holahan	Jon Kinnaly & Tracy Poust	April 7, 2010	4.03
The wedding day is approaching for Hilda. Betty asks Daniel to be her plus-one, Ignacio invites Elena, and Amanda is set on fixing up Marc with her new client, Spencer. Meanwhile, Justin weighs whether his own plus-one could be Austin, Betty considers unexpected offers in her personal and professional life, and Wilhelmina finds a way to fight the Meade empire by using Tyler as her pawn.
85	20	"Hello Goodbye"	Victor Nelli Jr.	Silvio Horta	April 14, 2010	5.43
In the award-winning series finale, which features appearances by familiar faces from the past, Betty finds it hard to tell Daniel that she has accepted a job in London. When Marc informs the entire company by email, Daniel's reaction surprises her, but not Claire. Justin and Bobby enthusiastically go apartment-hunting in Manhattan, but Hilda resists even the most amazing places. Amanda grapples with the death of her dog Halston, the last link to her mother. Marc wonders if he will ever have a successful relationship. Wilhelmina wakes from her coma, causing Claire much dread.

Notes:

- Episodes 66–74 aired on Fridays (October 16, 2009 – December 11, 2009).
- Episodes 75–85 aired on Wednesdays (January 6, 2010 – April 14, 2010).
- Season 4 was originally slated to have a total of 22 episodes but was reduced to 20 episodes.

== DVD release ==
Walt Disney Studios Home Entertainment released Ugly Betty Season Four, subtitled "From Poncho, to Honcho", on August 17, 2010 in the United States and Canada. All 20 episodes were included in the set, along with additional bonus tracks.

DVD name	Ep #	Release dates			Additional Features
DVD name	Ep #	Region 1	Region 2	Region 4	Additional Features
The Complete Fourth and Final Season – From Poncho, to Honcho	20	August 17, 2010	March 28, 2011	February 16, 2011	This six disc box set contains all 20 episodes from the fourth and final season.

Among the features:

- Betty Goes Bahamas – Follow the hilarious misadventures of Michael Urie and Becki Newton as they search for their fellow cast members during a location shoot in the Bahamas.
- Mode After Hours – Webisodes
  - "Stress-Orcism"
  - "Role Playing"
  - "Queenseeker"
  - "Harassment of a Sexual Nature"
- Betty Bloops
- Deleted Scenes
- Audio Commentary

== U.S. ratings ==
Episode #	Title	Airdate	Rating	Share	18–49 sss	Viewers (m)	Rank	Rank (timeslot) (viewers)
66	"The Butterfly Effect (Part 1)"	October 16, 2009	3.1	6	1.3	5.01	TBA	3
67	"The Butterfly Effect (Part 2)"	October 16, 2009	3.2	6	1.4	5.18	TBA	4
68	"Blue on Blue"	October 23, 2009	3.0	5	1.2	4.55	TBA	3
69	"The Weiner, the Bun, and the Boob"	October 30, 2009	3.0	5	1.2	4.50	TBA	3
70	"Plus None"	November 7, 2009	3.2	6	1.3	4.76	TBA	3
71	"Backseat Betty"	November 13, 2009	3.0	5	1.3	4.46	TBA	3
72	"Level (7) with Me"	November 27, 2009	2.3	4	0.9	3.39^{[A]}	TBA	4
73	"The Bahamas Triangle"	December 4, 2009	2.9	5	1.2	4.23	TBA	3
74	"Be-Shure"	December 11, 2009	3.3	6	1.4	4.80	TBA	2
75	"The Passion of the Betty"	January 6, 2010	3.5	5	1.8	5.13	TBA	2
76	"Back in Her Place"	January 13, 2010	4.6	4	1.7	4.67	TBA	2
77	"Blackout!"	January 20, 2010	3.2	6	1.6	4.59	TBA	2
78	"Chica and the Man"	February 3, 2010	2.9	5	1.5	4.34	TBA	3
79	"Smokin' Hot"	February 10, 2010	3.2	5	1.7	4.68	TBA	3
80	"Fire and Nice"	March 10, 2010	TBA	4	1.5	4.10	TBA	TBA
81	"All the World's a Stage"	March 17, 2010	TBA	3	1.0	3.33	TBA	TBA
82	"Million Dollar Smile"	March 24, 2010	3.2	5	1.7	4.63	TBA	3
83	"London Calling"	March 31, 2010	2.7	5	1.3	4.01	TBA	3
84	"The Past Presents the Future"	April 7, 2010					TBA	3
85	"Hello Goodbye"	April 14, 2010	3.7	7	1.8	5.43	TBA	2

== U.K. ratings ==
The fourth season was broadcast on Wednesday nights at 9 pm on E4, and an hour later on E4 +1.

Episode #	Title	Airdate	E4		E4 +1		Total viewers^{b} (m)	Rank cable
Episode #	Title	Airdate	Viewers^{a}	Rank	Viewers^{a}	Rank	Total viewers^{b} (m)	Rank cable
66	"The Butterfly Effect (Part 1)"	August 11, 2010	974	#1	233	#6	1.207	#5
67	"The Butterfly Effect (Part 2)"	August 18, 2010	886	#1	267	#1	1.153	#13
68	"Blue on Blue"	August 25, 2010	867	#1	188	#9	1.055	#11
69	"The Weiner, the Bun, and the Boob"	September 1, 2010	968	#1	209	#5	1.177	#8
70	"Plus None"	September 8, 2010	801	#1	200	#8	1.001	#16
71	"Backseat Betty"	September 15, 2010	827	#2	—N/a	—N/a	0.827	#18
72	"Level (7) with Me"	September 22, 2010	842	#2	—N/a	—N/a	0.842	#17
73	"The Bahamas Triangle"	September 29, 2010	938	#2	268	5	1.206	#13
74	"Be-Shure"	October 6, 2010	892	#2	316	#2	1.208	#12
75	"The Passion of the Betty"	October 13, 2010	800	#2	316	#3	1.116	#20
76	"Back in Her Place"	October 20, 2010	824	#2	247	#3	1.071	#20
77	"Blackout!"	November 3, 2010	738	#2	338	#3	1.076	—N/a
78	"Chica and the Man"	November 10, 2010	650	#6	248	#4	0.898	—N/a
79	"Smokin' Hot"	November 17, 2010	655	#4	—N/a	—N/a	0.655	—N/a
80	"Fire and Nice"	November 24, 2010	670	#4	212	#8	0.882	—N/a
81	"All the World's a Stage"	December 1, 2010	777	#2	341	#3	1.118	—N/a
82	"Million Dollar Smile"	December 8, 2010	984	#2	336	#2	1.320	#11
83	"London Calling"	December 15, 2010	997	#3	255	#5	1.252	#8
84	"The Past Presents the Future"	December 22, 2010	1,234	#1	265	#6	1.499	#3
85	"Hello Goodbye"	December 22, 2010	1,130	#2	387	#1	1.517	#8

^{a} Viewers in thousands.
All viewer figures and weekly ranks are from BARB.

== Production ==
Production for the fourth season began in July 2009. The cast headed to The Bahamas in October 2009 to shoot the episode "The Bahamas Triangle" on location at the Atlantis Resort and Casino. The series wrapped up filming in the United Kingdom in April 2010.
