= Smokin' Hot =

- Ugly Betty episode
- Episode no.: Season 4 Episode 14
- Directed by: John Scott
- Written by: Brian Tanen
- Production code: 414
- Original air date: February 10, 2010

Guest appearances
- Aubrey Dollar as Marisa; Katrina Bowden as Heather; Brian Reyes as himself; John Tartaglia as Paolo; Neal Bledsoe as Tyler; Kristen Johnston as Helen; Adam Rodríguez as Bobby; Alec Mapa as Suzuki St. Pierre

Episode chronology
← Previous "Chica and the Man"	Next → "Fire and Nice"
- Ugly Betty season 4

"Smokin' Hot" is the 14th episode of the fourth season of the American comedy-drama series, Ugly Betty, and the 79th episode overall. It originally aired on ABC in the United States on February 10, 2010.

== Plot ==
It is Fashion Week at Mode and Daniel helps Betty cover a low-priority show, this after Betty is singled out by Wilhelmina, who then gives her something else to do a story on, like the history of the sewing machine. However, thanks to a malfunction in Daniel's new Bluetooth headset that recorded a conversation between Daniel and Wilhelmina about Betty that later shows up on Betty's cellphone, Betty ends up giving Daniel the cold shoulder at work but she forgives him.

Betty discovers a new designer called Marisa, and decides to help promote her as one of the 10 Designers to Watch, however she faces stiff competition from Marc, who gives her tips on how to pitch the designer to Wilhelmina. During the pitching, Marc does the talking while Betty plays Vanna White, but after winning over Wilhelmina, Marc ends up getting all the credit instead of Betty, leaving her furious with him for failing to give her credit. Amanda, jealous of Betty and Marc moving up in the world, teams up with Helen to create a new clothing line to make the list, but struggles to persuade Marc and Betty to lobby Wilhelmina on her behalf. Both Marc and Betty agree that even though Amanda and Helen have great ideas, they cannot pitch the idea to Wilhelmina and come clean to an upset Amanda.

Daniel gets seduced into male modeling, which is spurred on by Wilhelmina who hopes to add more male models to the event after several of the females bail out. Claire's (Judith Light) son, Tyler, arrives in New York to find his mother, only to get sidetracked by Wilhelmina, who mistakes him for a male model and makes him part of the show, where he becomes the reason for Daniel's attempts to try to become a model. Daniel tries his best to walk, talk and act like a model, but realizes that at his age and with his excess weight that he is not cut out to be a model and opts out of the event.

At the Suarez home, Ignacio brings home a huge chandelier from the restaurant, which seems to have problems, and Hilda tells Bobby she wishes her salon would be struck by lightning, so she can use the insurance money. However, just as Betty comes home later that afternoon, Marisa, feeling nervous about the event, asks Betty if she can leave her designs at the place. This is later followed by Amanda, who stops by that evening to apologize to Betty. When Marisa stops by to tell Betty that she wants to back out but Betty calms her down, the three see Bobby yelling after they smell smoke coming from the salon as the Suarez home mysteriously catches fire and Marisa's designs are ruined.

Despite the damages, and thanks to a suggestion from Justin, Betty, Marisa and Amanda redesign the burned outfits to make them "Smokin' Hot", and Marisa's show is saved, although Wilhelmina ends up getting the credit for "discovering" Marisa. Also at the event, Helen tells Marc and Amanda that she got engaged to a guy she met during the show, while Betty and Marc reassure Amanda that she does have talent as a stylist. Just as Claire and Tyler discover each other at the event, Claire does come clean to Tyler afterwards, but tells him not to say anything about being her son yet. However, when Daniel sees Tyler talking to Claire, Claire lies to Daniel, who remarks that he is glad that he will not have to see Tyler again, which hurts Claire's feelings.

As for that fire at the Suarez home, Bobby consoles Hilda and tells her that because of the fire that she will be able to collect the insurance. This put doubts into Hilda's head but unaware at the same time outside the house, just as Justin prepares to take out the trash... Justin takes out a pack of cigarettes and a lighter from his jacket and puts them in the trash bag to cover his tracks.

When Betty thanks Wilhelmina for letting Marisa on the show and tells her that she has not been a fan of her taste, Wilhelmina tells her she noticed Betty being afraid of her, comparing it to her own experience with Fey Sommers. Wilhelmina says she never doubted herself, and reassures Betty that taste is having courage in one's own convictions. She then compliments Betty's shoes, which match hers.

== Production ==
"Smokin' Hot" was written by Brian Tanen and directed by John Scott. It first aired on 10 February 2010 in the United States on ABC, but was originally scheduled to air on 3 February 2010. Kristen Johnston, who previously starred on the American NBC sitcom 3rd Rock from the Sun, makes another guest appearance as Helen, Amanda's friend and temporary roommate. It was reported last year that Johnston took over the role after Paula Abdul left. John Tartaglia, best known for roles puppeteering Princeton and Rod for the Broadway musical Avenue Q, also makes a guest appearance.

== Ratings ==
Smokin' Hot posted a small increase in numbers from the previous week, with 4.7 million viewers tuning in and a 1.7/5 among 18-49s.

== Reception ==
Entertainment Weekly writer Tanner Stransky said the episode 'had it all'; "A fire at the Queens home of the Suarez clan, Fashion Week, yet another guest spot from the always hilarious Kristen Johnston, male models and the reappearance of Suzuki St. Pierre."

== See also ==
- Ugly Betty
- Ugly Betty season 4
