= Christina McKinney =

- Ugly Betty character
- Ashley Jensen as Christina McKinney
- First appearance: "Pilot" (episode 1.01)
- Last appearance: "London Calling" (episode 4.18)
- Created by: Silvio Horta
- Portrayed by: Ashley Jensen

In-universe information
- Gender: Female
- Occupation: Fashion designer Former; Designer and seamstress (at Mode Magazine)
- Family: 9 unnamed siblings
- Spouses: Stuart McKinney (husband; 2002-present; 1 child)
- Children: William Stuart "Will" McKinney (son, with Stuart; born February 19, 2009)
- Nationality: Scottish

Christina McKinney is a fictional character on the American dramedy Ugly Betty, which aired on ABC between 2006 and 2010. Christina was portrayed by Ashley Jensen. Introduced as a seamstress for the fashion magazine MODE, she is a close friend to the series protagonist Betty Suarez. She became increasingly involved in creative director Wilhelmina Slater's schemes over the course of the show. Jensen left Ugly Betty at the end of its third season to pursue other projects, though she returned in the season four episode "London Calling". Response to the character was primarily positive.

== Role ==
Scotswoman Christina McKinney immigrated from the United Kingdom to the United States to leave her husband, Stuart, and pursue her dream to become a fashion designer. She was a seamstress at fashion magazine MODE, and worked closely with its then-editor-in-chief Fey Sommers and creative director Wilhelmina Slater. She is a close friend to Betty Suarez, the assistant to the new editor-in-chief Daniel Meade, and provides advice for her personal and professional life. Wilhelmina offers Christina a featured spot at New York Fashion Week if she anonymously leaves a package at a police station. Christina accepts the deal and is recognized as a promising new designer by the fashion community. She feels increasingly uncomfortable with her new career after learning the package contained evidence to frame publishing mogul Bradford Meade for Fey's murder. Wilhelmina was working with Daniel's transgender sister Alexis Meade, believed to have died in a skiing accident, to take over MODE as its editor-in-chief. Bradford is arrested at New York Fashion Week, and Alexis takes his place as the head of the publishing company. Christina refuses to participate further in Wilhelmina's schemes, but Wilhelmina threatens to destroy her potential career as a designer. In one instance, Wilhelmina prevents Christina from sending a custom dress for Sarah Jessica Parker. When Christina tells Betty about her role in Bradford's arrest, their friendship is temporarily ended, though Betty later apologizes to her. Christina continues to help Betty with her love life, including telling her crush Henry Grubstick that his girlfriend Charlie cheated on him and may be pregnant with another man's child. In the season 1 finale, after Amanda Tanen brags that she was given her receptionist job at MODE because her father dealt with the finances of the editor, Fey Sommers, Amanda and Christina stumble upon Fey's "love dungeon", a room built in the MODE for her daily trysts with Bradford. While they are inside, Christina finds a birth certificate which identifies Fey as Amanda's birth mother.

During season 2, Christina joins an online dating service, and accidentally reconnects with Stuart. He comes to New York City to see Christina, and they have sex in the love dungeon. After Christina finds a needle in his rucksack, Stuart explains that he has liver failure, and has six months to live. He believes that an experimental treatment could save him, but it is too expensive. Christina promises to help Stuart with the money, but she later realizes that her insurance would not cover the procedure. Wilhelmina offers Christina the money for Stuart's operation on the condition that she becomes her surrogate. She is uncertain about the offer after discovering that Wilhelmina is using Bradford's sperm, which she procured after his death during their wedding ceremony. However, Christina agrees to the deal, and Betty acts as her confidant. Wilhelmina forces Christina to live in her apartment to monitor her pregnancy.

In season 3, when Christina suspects that Stuart is using drugs again, she sends his hair to a lab for testing. After the results are positive, Christina yells at him and threatens to call immigration services. Alexis pushes Christina down a flight of stairs in a blind rage because the baby she is carrying represent Wilhelmina's opportunity to take over MODE. Christina is briefly hospitalized for her injuries. While Wilhelmina initially plays up the incident to gain attention from the press, she later sympathizes with Christina and takes better care of her. Christina learns that Stuart's medical procedures were unsuccessful, though his health gradually improves over time. Christina gives birth to a boy, William, during the New York Fashion Week. Christina believes that the baby may actually be hers; since Wilhelmina is using the child to claim a stake in the Meade fortune and a place at MODE, she fabricates DNA results that show her as the biological mother. She also bans Christina from seeing the child. Christina kidnaps William, but is eventually caught by Wilhelmina. Betty convinces Wilhelmina to admit the truth about the child's parentage, though she also does so to appeal to the magazine's new partner Calvin Hartley as a ruthless businesswoman. Now that William has brought them together as a family, Christina and Stuart decide to go back to Edinburgh with their son. Betty reunites with Christina during a bachelorette party for her sister Hilda Suarez in London. Christina reveals that she has become a successful fashion designer after holding a fashion show. After spending the day sightseeing with Amanda and Hilda; and later spending the night drinking alongside them and Betty, Christina leaves the next morning to return to Stuart and William in Scotland, but assures Betty that this is not a goodbye.

== Development ==
While vacationing in the United States, Ashley Jensen auditioned for multiple television projects as part of the pilot season at the suggestion of her talent agent. She was attracted to Ugly Betty for its comedy and treatment of more serious subject matters such as body issues. Since Christina was developed as "a fast-talking New Yorker", Jenson mimicked a New York accent for her audition. However, the casting agents encouraged Jensen to use her natural Scottish accent instead, leading to the character being rewritten as a British immigrant. Before receiving the part, Jensen did a screen test and met with the show's producer Salma Hayek. According to The Independent, Jensen's performance as Maggie Jacobs on the British sitcom Extras helped her to secure the role on Ugly Betty. Jensen moved to Los Angeles after the pilot episode was filmed, though her husband Terence Beesley was unable to come with her until later.

According to Robert Lloyd of the Los Angeles Times, Christina had fewer lines than the other main characters during the show's first season. Lloyd described Jensen as taking on the "difficult and thankless role [of] the best friend", who is frequently relegated to providing exposition and advice. Jensen left Ugly Betty at the end of its third season, despite denying reports in January 2009. After the show moved to New York City for its fourth season, Jensen chose to remain in Los Angeles. When discussing her departure, Jensen explained "they didn't quite know what to do with my character", and she wanted to pursue other projects. The show's executive producer Silvio Horta said Jensen would return for future episodes.

== Reception ==
Christina McKinney was praised by critics. During his review of the pilot episode, Matthew Gilbert of The Boston Globe felt that Christina had potential, but required more screen time. While reviewing the first season, DVD Talk's Jeffrey Robinson cited Christina, along with Marc St. James, as underdeveloped, but wrote "they still bring quite a lot to the table in drama and comedy". Melanie McFarland of the Seattle Post-Intelligencer wrote that Christina "grants a necessary warm contrast to all the hideous behavior". In a 2009 article, a reviewer for AfterEllen.com praised Christina as the "most consistently funny character", and was critical of her removal from the show.
