= All the World's a Stage (Ugly Betty) =

- Ugly Betty episode
- Episode no.: Season 4 Episode 16
- Directed by: Andy Wolk
- Written by: Abraham Higginbotham; David Grubstick
- Production code: 416
- Original air date: 17 March 2010

Guest appearances
- Carol Kane as Lena Korvinka; Ryan McGinnis as Austin; Aaron Tveit as Zachary Boule; Dana Ivey as Roberta; Lydia Jordan as Lily

Episode chronology
← Previous "Fire and Nice"	Next → "Million Dollar Smile"

"All the World's a Stage" is the 16th episode of the fourth season of the American comedy-drama series, Ugly Betty, and the 81st episode overall. It originally aired on ABC in the United States on 17 March 2010.

== Plot ==
Justin loves his acting class, helmed by the eccentric Lena Korvinka (Carol Kane), and finds himself in an unexpected triangle with his new pals, Austin (Ryan McGinnis) and Lily. When Betty drops by class, she's smitten with a cool young playwright, Zachary (Aaron Tveit), whom she will profile for Mode. But she challenges her own ethics when she starts dating him. And Wilhelmina is hospitalized with a perforated ulcer, and can't help her type-A personality even when bedridden, but then her roommate, Roberta (Dana Ivey), prompts an epiphany.

== Notes ==
- The episode posted a large decrease in numbers from the previous week, with 3.3 million viewers tuning in, making it the absolute lowest result for an episode of Ugly Betty (taking the record from "Level (7) with Me" with 3.39 million viewers).
- The episode ironically received good reviews. Website TV Fanatic said that the episode "had some funny moments - like when Betty punched Zack in the face - but, overall we thought it was more touching than anything else."
- This episode features guest stars which include Broadway veteran Carol Kane (Lena Korvinka) and Next to Normal/Gossip Girl actor Aaron Tveit (Zachary Boule).

== See also ==
- Ugly Betty
- Ugly Betty season 4
