= Fire and Nice =

- Ugly Betty episode
- Episode no.: Season 4 Episode 15
- Directed by: John Terlesky
- Written by: Erika Johnson
- Production code: 415
- Original air date: 10 March 2010

Guest appearances
- Rich Sommer as Jimmy Wilson; Lainie Kazan as Dina Talercio; Nestor Serrano as Anthony Talercio; Brian Stokes Mitchell as Don Jones; Neal Bledsoe as Tyler; Adam Rodríguez as Bobby; Alec Mapa as Suzuki St. Pierre

Episode chronology
← Previous "Smokin' Hot"	Next → "All the World's a Stage"
- Ugly Betty season 4

"Fire and Nice" is the 15th episode of the fourth season of the American comedy-drama series, Ugly Betty, and the 80th episode overall. It originally aired on ABC in the United States on 10 March 2010.

== Plot ==
Following the fire, the entire Suarez family is living at Betty's apartment. Everyone, except Betty, believes that they are responsible for the fire. Justin tells Marc that he had been smoking to impress a girl, Hilda thinks Bobby and his family set the fire after she mentioned that she would like the insurance money and Ignacio tells Amanda that he wired the chandelier himself despite being told not to.

At MODE, Betty tries to pitch an idea for a Lady Gaga article to Wilhelmina, but it goes wrong when she finds her dessert has leaked onto her laptop keyboard and Justin has replaced her file with a video of himself singing Bad Romance. This causes Wilhelmina to give Betty's Lady Gaga article to another editor. Betty then goes to the fire station to see if she can find out what caused the fire, but the investigation has not happened yet. One of the firemen, Jimmy, offers to move Betty's family up the list if she goes out on a date with him. Betty is reluctant as she does not like him or his taste in humor, but she later accepts.

Wilhelmina runs into an old friend, Don, and with Marc's help she plans a date with him. Since Don remembers a different Wilhelmina from the woman she has become, Wilhelmina tells Marc that she needs to become 'Wanda' - a normal, nice Wilhelmina. Claire and Tyler spend some more time together and when Amanda spots them she convinces Claire to hire him as an in-house model. When Betty tells Marc she is going on a date with a fireman whom she does not like, Marc tells her to skip the appetizers and drinks and that way the date will be over quicker. On the date, Betty and Jimmy run into Wilhelmina and Don and they end up sitting at the same table. Wilhelmina and Betty pretend they are good friends in the office and Betty gets Wilhelmina to call Justin and tell him he can go to the Lady Gaga photo shoot. Later on, Wilhelmina confesses to Don that she does not like Betty, she is a bitch and she is only acting nice so he will have sex with her, which he does not mind.

Hilda is nervous when Bobby's parents come to dinner, as she believes they are members of the mafia who might have burnt down her house. Hilda accuses them of starting the fire, which they strongly deny and an argument begins. Betty returns home from her date with Jimmy and tells him that she only went out with him because he was going to move her family's fire investigation up the list. Betty walks in on the argument and when everyone begins admitting to starting the fire, Jimmy tells them that the fire was started by a curling iron that was left on by Betty.

Daniel sees Claire and Tyler hanging out and tells Tyler to leave Claire alone and Claire finally reveals to Daniel that Tyler is his brother. Furious at his mother, Daniel calls Amanda to see her, but she declines. It turns out she is out on a cab ride with Tyler, comforting him and reassuring him that he will have a friend in the city. Bobby tells Hilda that he has been carrying a ring around for weeks and tells her he lost her once, but he will not do it again and he proposes to her. She accepts and the family celebrates.

== Production ==
"Fire and Nice" was written by Erika Johnson and directed by John Terlesky. It first aired on 10 March 2010 in the United States on ABC.

== Reception ==
"Fire and Nice" posted a slight decrease in numbers from the previous week, with 4.1 million viewers tuning in.

The TV website, TV Fanatic said the episode "had plenty of interesting story lines to follow. Nothing was boring about Ugly Betty last night" and they gave the episode 5 out of 5 stars. Entertainment Weekly writer Tanner Stransky called the episode "a pure delight".

== See also ==
- Ugly Betty
- Ugly Betty season 4
