= The Bahamas Triangle =

- Ugly Betty episode
- Episode no.: Season 4 Episode 8
- Directed by: Victor Neili, Jr.
- Written by: Sheila Lawrence
- Production code: 408
- Original air date: December 4, 2009

Guest appearances
- Grant Bowler as Connor Owens; Alec Mapa as Suzuki St. Pierre; Ralph Macchio as Archie Rodriguez; Adam Rodríguez as Bobby Talercio; Shakira as herself; Christie Brinkley as Penelope Graybridge

Episode chronology
← Previous "Level (7) with Me"	Next → "Be-Shure"

"The Bahamas Triangle" is an episode from the ABC comedy-drama series Ugly Betty, which aired on December 4, 2009. It is the eighth episode from Season 4 and the 73rd episode overall.

== Plot ==
At Mode, Betty pitches a story about Australian swimmer, actress, entertainer and swimsuit pioneer Annette Kellerman (who looks a great deal like Betty in the kinescope sequence), who was arrested in 1907 for indecent exposure after she walked onto a public beach in Boston in a one-piece swimsuit, for Mode's upcoming "Fearless" issue. As Wilhelmina reminds the staff about the Bahamas layout and the last shoot she will make for Mode, Marc frets about his employment, Nico's betrayal, Connor's death and Wilhelmina's future as this is her last issue. Wilhelmina assures Marc that she plans to become an editor at one of Mode's competitors, and that he will continue to be her assistant. Later, Betty and Matt talk about how they got Daniel out of the cult and still insist they are still friends. After she leaves, Amanda shows up to give Matt a gift, only for him to tell her that she is going to be part of the Mode personnel who are going to the Bahamas shoot. When Betty reads the roster on her e-mail, she sees Amanda's name, then confronts Marc who, after seeing Matt and Amanda together, spills the beans to Betty.

At home, Hilda shows off a scene from "Extreme Makeover: Home Edition", when Justin arrives with Bobby. Hilda is curious as to why Bobby would bring Justin home, which Bobby claims that he was doing his ex a favor. Later that night, Betty tells Hilda and Justin about Matt's interest in Amanda, and starts questioning why she would go with Matt, although Betty is not going to the Bahamas. Upon learning that Hilda and Archie would love to go to the Bahamas, Betty offers to get them tickets, while Justin shows Betty a scrapbook featuring Shakira, called "My Life With Shakira", and wants Betty to get an autograph from her. The next day, Betty tries to convince Daniel that he will have a great time in the Bahamas, even though people at work are still joking about the Community of the Phoenix, something he wants to forget. When Wilhelmina and Marc walk by the reception to discuss the shoot and the possibility of Wilhelmina to take the Editor-in-Chief job at Isabella, only for Marc to request a vacation for himself, they turn around and see Betty hiding from Amanda and Matt. However, Wilhelmina tells Betty that she will now accompany her to the Bahamas shoot as her assistant, and allows Marc to take a vacation. Later that day at home, Hilda surprises Archie with the Bahamas tickets Betty got for them, only to learn that Archie has work commitments that weekend and he fears that going on a vacation would damage his political career.

In the Bahamas, Wilhelmina lays down the rules to Betty, but Betty is distracted by Matt and Amanda. She reports back to Hilda at home via cellphone because she sees the two at every opportunity. Hilda, after getting off the phone with her sister, reads a post-it from Ignacio about the furnace and when she tries to turn it on, the handle breaks off. Bobby, who is stopping by to bring Justin's Playbill that he left in the car, ends up helping Hilda fix the furnace, but Hilda tells Bobby that she is in a relationship with Archie. Bobby is aware of this, but then admits to Hilda that he still has feelings for her. He then leaves, unable to fix the furnace.

Marc meets Daniel at an outdoor bar and the two bond over being single. Marc sets Daniel up with a woman named Savannah, who is charmed with Daniel. However, while in bed, Daniel cannot achieve an erection, due to the recent loss of Molly. During the shoot, Wilhelmina is stunned to see her rival, Penelope Graybridge (Christie Brinkley), accept the new job as Editor-in-Chief at Isabella on Fashion TV, while Betty finally confronts Amanda over Matt, which leads the two into a race down the water slide to see who he will choose. Although Betty wins, Amanda tells her that it was Matt who invited her. Matt arrives to see this, but Betty tells the two that she is cool with the two together. Marc then arrives to tell Betty that Wilhelmina has disappeared.

While Wilhelmina sits alone at the beach, Connor shows up in the water, very much alive. A stunned Wilhelmina slaps him, but the two finally kiss and have a passionate romp on the beach, followed by a passionate afternoon between the sheets. As Betty arrives at Wilhelmina's suite to tell her that the wrangler passed out on the set, a topless Wilhelmina holding a bucket of ice cubes surprises Betty. As Betty explains to Wilhelmina about the shoot going wrong, Wilhelmina is not at all worried, fueled by the afternoon delight she had with Connor, and tells Betty to relax and take care of it. During a romantic evening on the beach, Amanda is spoiled by Matt over dinner and candlelight. However, Amanda is starting to sense that Matt still has feelings for Betty, so before she walks away, Amanda tells Matt to tell Betty the truth.

Later on back at the bar, Marc consoles Daniel over his failed hook-up with Savannah; and advises him to just be who he is now instead of who he was before Molly. Daniel then tells Marc, who still feels unlucky in finding a guy, that Wilhelmina is lucky to have him as an assistant, which Marc takes as a compliment since he rarely gets appreciated by Wilhelmina. Daniel then helps Marc finally land a guy named Troy. As Amanda arrives, Marc tells Amanda to console Daniel as he goes to meet Troy. Daniel and Amanda then talk about their past and romantic failures and discover that they have a lot in common. Later that night at a party, Betty, who now has to keep an eye on the models, tries to loosen up, but Matt shows up to save her, saying that Amanda advised him to come back, then they kiss. That night, the respective couplings of Daniel and Amanda, Betty and Matt, Marc and Troy (who works at Mode and happens to be after Marc for some time, as Marc later learns from both him and Betty), and Wilhelmina and Connor end up sleeping together, as do Hilda and Bobby back in Queens.

The following morning, Marc arrives to tell Betty and Matt that the models are missing; Matt then finds out over the phone that some of them took a trip to Cuba with several guys from the party. Inspired by Justin's Shakira book, Betty begs Shakira, who she ran into earlier, to do the shoot to save the project, and Shakira agrees after Betty pitches the idea of wearing a vintage Annette Kellerman-inspired swimsuit. The shoot pleases Betty and Wilhelmina, but is interrupted by the Bahamian authorities and the FBI, who were tipped off by someone who discovered Connor's whereabouts. To cover things up, Connor tells Wilhelmina to take credit for turning him in. They kiss before going through with the plan, and everyone at the shoot is surprised to see Connor as he arrested.

Back at home, Betty gives Justin a straw that Shakira used as a souvenir from her trip, while Archie shows up with a surprise Bahamas-themed party to apologize to Hilda for missing their trip and pledges to spend more time away from work with her. But as the two hug, Hilda feels guilty about cheating on Archie with Bobby.

Back at work, Daniel and Amanda briefly talk about what happened at the resort, coming to the realization that there is no baggage between them despite their fling, leaving them in a mutually beneficial place emotionally. Meanwhile, Wilhelmina, who thanks to "turning in Connor" can keep her job, learns from Marc that he wants better career opportunities and has thus accepted Daniel's offer to be his new assistant, which visibly upsets her. Finally, Betty and Matt talk about their future now that are a couple again.

== Notes ==
- This episode was shot on location at the Atlantis Resort, Bahamas during October 2009. Also, the Ugly Betty fonts were once again used in yet another opening sequence, this time during the 1907 black & white swimsuit scene after Betty, as "Kellereman", was arrested.
- This episode got a 2.9/5 overall and a 1.2/4 among 18-49s, with 4.23 million viewers tuning in, making it the second lowest in the series, but at the same time recovered from the previous outing with a 33% increase.
- In the UK, the episode was the 3rd most viewed in the season.
- Although Shakira did not perform in the episode, two tracks from her 2009 album She Wolf, "Give It Up to Me" and "Gypsy", were featured in the background. Other music includes "Fascination" by La Roux off of the album La Roux, "Shark in the Water" by VV Brown, and "Numba 1 (Tide is High)" by Kardinal Offishall featuring Rihanna.
- Shakira, who played herself, mentioned to Betty that she was hiding out from the public while staying at the resort by using disguises in this episode. In real life, the singer does take time out from the public eye to keep a low profile by using aliases so she wouldn't be noticed, like she did back in 2007 when she attended classes at the University of California, Los Angeles under the name "Isabel", which is also the singer's middle name.
- Judith Light (Claire Meade) and Tony Plana (Ignacio Suarez) are not credited and do not appear.
- This episode introduces Matt Newton (Troy), as Marc's new love interest, as a recurring star. Matt is the real-life brother of series regular Becki Newton (Amanda Tanen).
- This episode featured hotel guests who were pulled off the beach to sit at the outdoor beach bar as extras.

== See also ==
- Ugly Betty
- Ugly Betty season 4
