= Backseat Betty =

- Ugly Betty episode
- Episode no.: Season 4 Episode 6
- Directed by: John Putch
- Written by: Tracy Poust & Jon Kinnally
- Production code: 406
- Original air date: November 13, 2009

Guest appearances
- Jamie-Lynn Sigler as Natalie; Yaya DaCosta as Nico Slater; Ralph Macchio as Archie Rodriguez, Jr.; Dylan Baker as Bennett Wallis; Bonnie Dennison as Ava

Episode chronology
← Previous "Plus None"	Next → "Level (7) with Me"

"Backseat Betty" is an episode from the dramedy series Ugly Betty, which aired on November 13, 2009. It is the sixth episode from Season 4, and the 71st episode overall.

== Plot ==
Hilda's badboy high school flame and Betty's schoolgirl crush, Bobby Talercio (Adam Rodriguez), teaches at Justin's school, causing the sisters to both doubt their feelings for "nice guys". Justin is struggling to fit in at high school, so Marc advises him to befriend the mean girl type cheerleaders. When Justin is invited to Homecoming, he becomes the victim of another prank as he is jokingly awarded as "Homecoming Queen" but Justin takes Marc's advice and manages to turn the prank back at his bullies. Meanwhile, Daniel introduces Amanda to the Community of the Phoenix, as he's lured deeper into its clutches by the leader, Bennett (Dylan Baker) and his teammate Natalie. Wilhelmina takes a drastic step to find money for Nico's blackmail payment but when she finds out that Connor is dead, she cries, knowing that her life is slowly shutting down.

== See also ==
- Ugly Betty
- Ugly Betty season 4

== Notes ==
- The episode, despite the excellent critical reception, pulled in a 3.0/5 overall, with a 1.3/4 among 18-49s and 4.5 million tuning in, down slightly from the previous outing.
- The episode received good reviews. Entertainment Weekly's Michael Ausiello called this episode "exceptionally funny, moving, gutsy", called Ana Ortiz' performance Emmy-worthy and also praised Michael Urie, Mark Indelicato, Vanessa Williams and America Ferrera for their performances. EW's Tanner Stransky also praised this episode as well.
- This episode introduces Adam Rodriguez (Bobby Talercio) as a recurring star.
