= Level (7) with Me =

- Ugly Betty episode
- Episode no.: Season 4 Episode 7
- Directed by: John Fortenberry
- Written by: Chris Black
- Production code: 407
- Original air date: November 27, 2009

Guest appearances
- Jamie-Lynn Sigler as Natalie; Dylan Baker as Bennett Wallis; Alec Mapa as Suzuki St. Pierre; Sarah LaFleur as Molly; Yaya DaCosta as Nico Slater; Piter Marek as Oskar Castelar/Jonathan

Episode chronology
← Previous "Backseat Betty"	Next → "The Bahamas Triangle"
- Ugly Betty season 4

"Level (7) with Me" is an episode from the ABC comedy-drama series Ugly Betty which was first broadcast on November 27, 2009. It is the seventh episode from season 4 and the 72nd episode overall.

== Plot ==
Fashion TV reporter Suzuki St. Pierre reports on Wilhelmina's recent departure from Mode, but Daniel wants to talk about the Community of the Phoenix, prompting Suzuki to end the interview. As Daniel lets the leaders of the Community call the shots at Mode, Betty becomes very concerned about him and his behavior. She confronts Daniel in the men's room and convinces him to do a story on the group, secretly scheming with Claire to infiltrate the organization. At the Community offices, Betty interviews Bennett in an effort to find out more, but when Bennett refuses to let her see the Level 7 room and brings up Betty's late mother, she becomes suspicious.

Amanda talks to Marc about Matt, but Marc still has doubts about Amanda falling for Betty's ex. Amanda later walks up to Matt and asks him out. As Claire passes by Amanda, Amanda gives her a letter from the South Dakota Department of Children's Services about her long-lost son. At Matt's place, when Amanda mentions Bennett to Matt, Matt worries because he has experienced Bennett's groups but only got to Level 2. Meanwhile, Claire asks Betty to hack into Daniel's laptop to check his financial records, but Daniel catches and confronts them. Unfortunately, Natalie notifies Bennett and calls Daniel away. Claire picks up a call from Matt, warning them about Bennett and Level 7, and that the tea Daniel has been drinking is a drug which once resulted in the death of a member. They race to stop Daniel, but he has already left with Natalie.

At the center, Betty, Claire, Amanda and Matt plan to rescue Daniel and split up. Matt makes a scene to distract the security guards, and Claire and Amanda end up in a bereavement group, where they confess their issues between each other about Fey. Betty discovers the Level 7 room is empty; and that Bennett, Daniel and Natalie are at Molly's apartment. She and Claire step in to stop Daniel from being drugged. Daniel sees Molly in a hallucination, but Betty does the talking. Believing that Molly is convincing him to let go, Daniel kisses her ghost goodbye. As they leave, Daniel tries to talk some sense into Natalie, but she blames him for ruining her chance to be with her late boyfriend.

The following day, Matt and Amanda talk and arrange another date, when Claire finally buries the hatchet with Amanda, who advises her to contact her long-lost son. Claire takes the advice and makes arrangements to see him. With Betty's help, Daniel finally cleans Molly's things out of her apartment. When Daniel asks if he actually kissed Betty, Betty replies that he did, but he kissed her eyebrow because she is shorter than Molly.

The effects of Wilhelmina being unemployed have taken a toll on Marc. Wili is not fazed and hopes to find a way to save Nico by finding money to pay off Oskar. Nico is upset when Wili decides to send her daughter to Venezuela for her own protection, even though she wants to stay in New York. During the afternoon Marc, embarrassed by Wili in the press, races back to her apartment to throw out her clothes, when he overhears Nico and the detective talking about Wili. He warns Wili, who confronts Nico but believes her daughter's explanation. Hours later, Wili shows Nico a family heirloom, a necklace that she will sell in order to pay off the detective. The next morning, Nico opens the safe to steal the necklace but it is empty. She is caught by Wili, who realizes that Nico and her boyfriend planned the murder scheme to get money from her, and throws her out, telling her never to come back.

== Production and broadcast ==
According to ABC's press release for the November 2009 sweeps, this episode was originally slated to air on November 20, 2009, but was pushed back a week so it could air Shrek the Third.

== Viewership and reception ==
This was the second lowest-rated episode in the history of the series as it managed to place a 2.3/4 overall, a rare 0.9/3 among 18-49s and pulled in only 3.4 million viewers (the record previously held by "Curveball" with 6.16 million viewers and finally taken over by "All the World's a Stage" with 3.33 million viewers). Given that it was a Thanksgiving holiday, it was surprisingly beaten by repeats and movies. In addition, several ABC affiliates had scheduled other holiday programs on the date this episode aired (which was done weeks in advance prior to ABC's rescheduling), which also contributed to its fourth place showing.
