= Pilot (Ugly Betty) =

- Ugly Betty episode
- Betty Suarez before her interview for fashion magazine MODE.
- Episode no.: Season 1 Episode 1
- Directed by: Richard Shepard
- Written by: Silvio Horta
- Production code: 101
- Original air date: September 28, 2006

Guest appearance
- Full list: Michael Urie as Marc St. James; William Abadie as Phillippe Michel; Kevin Sussman as Walter; Gina Gershon as Fabia; Lupita Ferrer as Rich Latina; Abigail Forman as Charmaine; Ava Gaudet as Gina Gambarro; David Jenkins as HR Guy; Elizabeth Payne as Masked Lady; Cicily Daniels as Zelda; Christine Jones as Fey Sommers; Scott Porter as Guy; Stelio Savante as Steve; Kristen Schaal as Nancy; Eric Jordan Young as Neal Delongpre

Episode chronology
← Previous —	Next → "The Box and the Bunny"
- Ugly Betty season 1

"Pilot" is the first episode and the series premiere of the American comedy-drama series Ugly Betty. It first aired on September 28, 2006 on the ABC network in the United States. This is also the most watched episode of the season and the series with more than 16 million viewers.

== Plot ==
Betty Suarez, an unglamorous woman in her 20s, starts work for a fashion magazine called MODE, and in the process is introduced to the harsh treatment she will have to deal with from her more beautiful co-workers. She also meets with her boss, Daniel Meade, who was just named the new editor in chief by his father, Bradford Meade. Daniel succeeds the revered Fey Sommers, who was killed in a suspicious car accident. The announcement of Daniel being named editor-in-chief does not sit well with Wilhelmina Slater, the magazine's creative editor who has been vying for the position herself.

Daniel is not keen about having Betty working with him because she is homely, so he plots to have her quit by giving her difficult and outrageous tasks. When Betty gets wind of this from the company seamstress, Christina McKinney, she is badly hurt and says that perhaps that is the way she was supposed to land a job. After Daniel makes Betty stand in for an embarrassing modeling shoot, he has a change of heart after realizing what he is putting her through and halts the shoot as Betty walks out in anger and tears, leaving a regretful Daniel behind.

In her personal life, Betty has to deal with her sister Hilda Suarez, a single mother who thinks that her college-educated sister is not cut out for work in the fashion world, and wants Betty to join her in selling Herbalux. Betty takes responsibility for her father Ignacio Suarez by phoning his HMO to get treatment for his health condition. As well as this, Betty's boyfriend, Walter, dumps her for her neighbor Gina Gambarro. After going to Gina's house to complain about her dating activities, and walking in on her making out with another man, Betty learns that Gina was using Walter in order to get a discount on a plasma TV. Fuming, Betty storms out of Gina's house, accidentally destroying the TV in the process.

Daniel later learns that he is in danger of losing the Fabia cosmetics account, unaware that he is being sabotaged by Wilhelmina and his best friend, a photographer who has been known to plagiarize other people's work (after Betty mentions a layout he did) and is responsible for the aforementioned shoot that Betty was in. After seeing a new cosmetics layout proposal created by Betty, Daniel realizes that he needs her. Walter later ends things with Gina and tries to convince Betty to take him back. However, they are interrupted when Daniel walks in, so Betty tells Walter to leave, after which Daniel makes a passionate plea to her to return after seeing her layout proposal. Betty eventually returns and in the process not only saves the campaign, but also his job.

Meanwhile, Wilhelmina pays a visit to a person whose face is partially wrapped up and it is revealed that the two are already discussing behind-the-scenes sinister plans to take over Meade Publications. While she looks in the mirror, she also says that they should keep a close eye on Betty.

== Production ==
=== Casting ===
America Ferrera was cast as the titular character, after Hayek approached her about the role. Ferrera said she read the script and "fell in love with the character". Ferrera compared Betty to Bridget from Bridget Jones's Diary, calling her an "underdog". In February 2006, Christian Toto from The Washington Times reported that Eric Mabius had joined the cast as Daniel Meade, the son of the publisher who was made editor-in-chief of MODE. Actress Charlotte Ross was originally cast as Wilhelmina Slater, but she pulled out before filming to join the pilot for ABC comedy show Pink Collar. Vanessa L. Williams replaced Ross.

Becki Newton did not expect to get the role of receptionist Amanda Tanen, after she attended two unsuccessful pilot auditions on the same day. Of her casting, Horta said "We were trying to find a girl that is gorgeous and funny, and that's a lot tougher than you think. It's really rare. And Becki came in and she was beautiful and she just nailed it." Michael Urie knew that his role of Wilhelmina's assistant Marc St. James was a one episode appearance, as an original story idea had Wilhelmina firing her assistants each week. Urie explained that he only had a few scenes in the pilot, but Williams made sure he stood close to her, so they could perform some funny moments together and then she would "bark" the character's name, so his scenes were not cut. Urie became a series regular when Horta noticed that he had good comic timing.

Ana Ortiz originally auditioned for the role of Betty. She made an effort to change her appearance for the character, but she knew she was not right for the part. She said, "I was super plain. I just put on some glasses and kept my hair kind of flat and layered on the clothing. My objective was mainly to go in there and give a really good audition because I was so excited about the project." Ortiz was asked to play Betty's older sister Hilda instead.

British actress Ashley Jensen was cast as Christina McKinney, a seamstress and Betty's confidante. Shortly after acquiring an American agent, Jensen travelled to Los Angeles in January 2006 for pilot season. She was sent the script for Ugly Betty and later attended a screen test at the studio, which she described as "terrifying". Christina was originally American, but the producers liked Jensen's Scottish accent so much they changed the character's nationality in order for her to keep it and remain British. As well as producing the series, Hayek makes an appearance as a maid on a telenovela watched by the Suarez family. Venezuelan telenovela star Lupita Ferrer also appears in the scene.

=== Filming ===
Horta had a specific idea of what Betty's world and the MODE offices would look like. He compared his vision to the directorial style of Pedro Almodóvar, calling it "a bit of heightened reality, but a real sort of grounded, emotional factor". Richard Shepard was chosen to direct the pilot, after Horta saw his work on The Matador (2005). He thought the bright colors and the balance of comedy and emotion that Shepard set in the film was also the right tone for Ugly Betty. The pilot was shot in early 2006 on location in New York City and at the Silvercup Studios. The Woolworth Building in Manhattan stood in for the headquarters of Meade Publications, while Betty's home in Queens was shot on-location in the borough. After the pilot was filmed, production for the rest of the season was moved to Los Angeles as filming in New York was believed to be too expensive at the time.

=== Costumes and make-up ===
Former Sex and the City costume designer Patricia Field worked on the clothing for the pilot. Shephard told Field that he wanted an explosion of color in the episode, which appealed to her, as she was often told to hold back. Field and her team created Betty's "garish" Guadalajara poncho after they could not find one that was "tacky enough" to fit the brief. Several different ponchos and a Mexican jacket were reconstructed into the end product. Betty's signature red Alain Mikli glasses originally belonged to Field. She and her team had had trouble finding the right pair, when Ferrera noticed Field wearing the glasses on her head and asked to try them on. Field donated the glasses to the show, as the distinctive "cat-eyed shape" drew attention to Betty's bushy eyebrows and hair.

To create Betty's bushy eyebrows, make-up artist Beverly Jo Pryor used a specially designed brush to apply a cream eye liner to Ferrera's face that gave an appearance of individual hairs. Pryor also used a little blush, lip moisturizer and a skin moisturizer that was lighter than Ferrera's real skin color to complete the character's look. Betty's braces were created using a plastic piece, similar to a retainer, that fitted over Ferrera's teeth. The actress went to a dentist, who made a mold of her teeth, so the piece would fit correctly. Hairstylist Roddy Stayton made a dark brown wig out of real hair for the character. He said, "the look is supposed to be that she got up, shampooed her hair and just let it dry."

== Reception ==
=== Ratings ===
In its original airing, "Pilot" attracted 16.32 million viewers and a 5.0 rating/14 share among adults 18-49, making it ABC's best demo result with a regular scripted series since the debut of My So-Called Life in 1995.

In the United Kingdom, "Pilot" originally aired on Channel 4 on January 5, 2007, attracting 4.89 million viewers, giving it a 19% audience share between 9.30pm and 10.30pm. Ugly Betty had the third highest audience for any US series launch on Channel 4, after Lost and Desperate Housewives.

In Australia, the episode pulled in 2.13 million viewers, making it the highest rated show in the country for February 18, 2007.

=== Critical response ===
The episode received mostly positive reviews. Robert Bianco of USA Today gave the episode 3 and a half stars, and wrote "There is no new show more likable, but that affection may waver if Betty can't give Ferrera the scripts and support she deserves. Even intense charm can curdle if you lean on it exclusively." Rob Owen from the Pittsburgh Post-Gazette deemed the episode "pretty good", but he wondered if the "premise may be too slight" to maintain a full series. The New York Times' Virginia Heffernan praised Mabius and Ferrera's "sparkling rapport" and said "the two have a valet-hero back-and-forth that, if the writers really explore it, might make them a prime-time Wooster and Jeeves." Heffernan added that the show was "worth watching" for its humor and sweetness. Michael Slezak from Entertainment Weekly observed that the episode was full of clichés, but thought Ferrera's performance was good enough to hide the fact they had all been seen before. He added "Despite a pilot episode that doesn't contain a single surprising plot point, Betty comes off as remarkably fresh."

Michael Ausiello, writing for TV Guide, chose the episode as his "most satisfying pilot", adding "Allow me to be the first to say, 'God bless America Ferrera!'" A writer for PopSugar said "We enjoyed the first episode and can't wait to see where it's headed." They thought that the show's format would have been ideal for a thirty-minute sitcom instead of being an hour long, but hoped the network's decision would prove them wrong in the long term. The Liverpool Echo's Paddy Shennan praised the episode for having "substance as well as style" and for its "extremely likeable" main character. Shennan quipped "It's all far-fetched nonsense, but it's fun, far-fetched nonsense". Hadley Freeman of The Guardian also noted the clichés, but thought some of the jokes were funny and enjoyed Ferrera's performance. Freeman stated that she was "not only appealing with palpable intelligence, she manages to play the outsider without recourse to sneering at the world in which she works."

=== Accolades ===
The episode was nominated for and won several awards following its broadcast. At the 9th ALMA Awards, Horta won the Outstanding Writer for a Television Series, Mini-Series, or TV Movie accolade. While Shepard won the Directors Guild of America Award for Outstanding Directorial Achievement in a Comedy Series. Junie Lowry Johnson and Bernard Telsey won the Comedy Pilot Casting award from the Casting Society of America. Lowry Johnson also received a nomination in the Best Comedy Episodic Casting category.

At the 59th Primetime Emmy Awards, Shepard won Outstanding Directing for a Comedy Series and Ferrera won Outstanding Lead Actress in a Comedy Series. The episode had been submitted for consideration in the categories of Outstanding Writing for a Comedy Series and Outstanding Guest Actor in a Comedy Series (for Sussman) respectively.
