= Be-Shure =

- Ugly Betty episode
- Episode no.: Season 4 Episode 9
- Directed by: David Dworetsky
- Written by: Gail Lerner
- Production code: 409
- Original air date: December 11, 2009

Guest appearances
- David Rasche as Calvin Hartley; Grant Bowler as Connor Owens; Alec Mapa as Suzuki St. Pierre; Ralph Macchio as Archie Rodriguez; Adam Rodríguez as Bobby Talercio

Episode chronology
← Previous "The Bahamas Triangle"	Next → "The Passion of the Betty"

"Be-Shure" is an episode from the ABC comedy-drama series Ugly Betty, which aired on December 11, 2009. It is the ninth episode from Season 4 and the 74th episode overall.

== Plot ==
Ignacio makes potato latkes for the family breakfast, announcing that he has invited his new girlfriend Jean over for a Christmas–Hanukkah dinner. As Betty leaves, Bobby stops by, which upsets Hilda, even though Bobby is there to pick up Justin. After she leaves, Betty starts to feel queasy as does Hilda later on while she and Archie are visiting Macy's to drop a letter to support the Make-A-Wish Foundation.

After separately buying pregnancy tests at the pharmacy, Betty and Hilda arrive home to help Ignacio, while at the same time they separately head to the bathroom to pee so they can see if they are expecting. During the ensuing chaos, both try to keep each other and Ignacio from finding out as they fight for bathroom time and drop their sticks on the floor in the melee. The two separately discover a positive on their sticks thanks to a mix-up with their kits and both worry that they might be pregnant. But just as the two try to keep quiet about their double pregnancy, they meet Jean, discovering that she is the same pharmacist who sold them their pregnancy tests.

As the sisters go back to the bathroom, they see the two sticks, but one turns up positive and the other negative. As they argue over whom is pregnant, with Hilda confessing that Bobby is the father and not Archie, Matt walks in on the two. When he sees Betty with the stick and is led to believe that Betty is the one with child, he is excited about the prospect of being a father, much to Betty's distress. She and Hilda agree to take another test to be sure, so Matt buys more pregnancy tests. In the bathroom, Betty and Matt wait for a few minutes on her new test, then a negative sign appears, as Betty breathes a sigh of relief that she is not the one who is pregnant, even though Matt is somewhat disappointed.

A devastated Hilda is afraid to tell Archie about the pregnancy and that he is not the father, but Betty thinks that Hilda should come clean. However, before she can do so, Archie decides that it is better to end the relationship, feeling that there is someone out there that deserves her. Hilda then begins to debate on whether to tell Bobby about the pregnancy. As the evening finishes, Betty and Matt talk outside about visualizing their future together if they ever decide to have a family, then they kiss.

Claire and Daniel discuss hiring a new creative director despite the disagreements over Calvin running Mode and Daniel being blamed for hiring Connor, while Marc is struggling due to Wilhelmina's departure. Cal later stops by to introduce Daniel to their new creative director, a clueless Hollywood mogul named Denise Ludwig, with whom Daniel is not happy. Meanwhile, Wilhelmina secretly visits Connor daily at his prison cell where they have passionate sex, as they hope that as soon as they get the money back Wilhelmina will be back at Mode. When Wilhelmina returns to reclaim her job, Daniel tells her that it was filled. Wilhelmina then leaves, but when Daniel wants to get even with Cal by recovering the money, Marc suggests enlisting Wilhelmina in an effort to get the money back.

Hours later back at prison, Wilhelmina and Connor are interrupted by a phone call from Daniel. Connor answers the call but refuses to spill the beans and blames him for taking Molly and making Wilhelmina choose between him and the company, saying that he knows where the money is. However, this was anticipated by Wilhelmina and Connor, who set up a scheme in an effort to get Cal out of Mode. This also sets up a scheme for Daniel to get the company back in family control, as Marc suggests to Daniel that Wilhelmina may be useful in retrieving the money from Connor. As they go to Wilhelmina's place, the two agree to get the money back, on the condition that Wilhelmina gets a 50% stake in Meade Publications and equal veto power and that Daniel does not consult Claire.

Amanda tells Claire that a plane is ready for her flight to Rapid City, South Dakota to see her son Tyler. In Rapid City, Claire arrives at a bar and sees a bartender, who happens to be Tyler, after she asks him for a beer as a way to get to know more about him. As Tyler talks about his life, Claire listens to him, seeing that he has done well for himself. As Claire leaves a $2,000 tip for Tyler, she informs Amanda that she does not want him to know anything about her. However, as Tyler returns for the tip, he sees an envelope that has Claire's name and address on it.

== Notes ==
- This would the last episode in the series to air on Friday nights, as ABC announced on December 1, 2009, that it would move Ugly Betty to Wednesday nights starting January 6, 2010.
- Although the series will be moving to Wednesdays, this episode showed yet another resurgence, as it posted a 3.3/6 overall, a 1.4/4 among 18-49s, and 4.8 million viewers tuning in, a 17% increase from the previous episode, thus resulting in its best numbers this season since "The Butterfly Effect Part 2" and its second best showing on Friday, as it beat a rerun of Medium to place second behind a Dateline: NBC exclusive on an interview with one of Tiger Woods' alleged mistresses, Jamie Jungers.
- Macy's and the Make-A-Wish Foundation added to the list of product placements in this series, given the holiday theme of this episode.
- Ralph Macchio (Archie Rodriguez) is credited as a recurring star for the last time. This episode also introduces two new recurring stars: Nadia Dajani (Denise Ludwig), and Neal Bledsoe (Tyler Meade-Hartley).
- Chris Martin from Coldplay's version of Have Yourself A Merry Little Christmas plays during the final scene of the episode.

== See also ==
- Ugly Betty
- Ugly Betty season 4
