= Ryan McGinnis =

American actor and dancer

Ryan McGinnis is an American actor and dancer, known for his role in the ABC comedy series Ugly Betty as Austin Marley. He also appeared as Glenn Childs Jr. in two episodes of the second season of the CBS drama series The Good Wife.

== Biography and career ==
McGinnis took dance classes at the Knecht Dance Academy in Levittown, Pennsylvania, for which he won numerous national Dance titles. He was Dance Masters of America's Petite Master Dance of America in 2006. After appearing in several commercials, small roles on the Nickelodeon sitcoms iCarly and Victorious, and starring in an episode of Law & Order: Criminal Intent, McGinnis was cast in a recurring role as Austin Marley, Justin's love interest, in the fourth season of Ugly Betty, appearing in the final five episodes of the show. He appears in the 2012 film Gayby.

== Filmography ==
Year	Title	Role	Notes
2007	iCarly	Boy dancer #4	Episode: "iDream of Dance"
2009	Law & Order: Criminal Intent	Cyrano	Episode: "Family Values"
2010	Ugly Betty	Austin Marley	5 episodes
2010	Victorious	Dancer #1	Episode: "Tori the Zombie"
2010	Spark	Trudeau	Short film
2010–2011	The Good Wife	Glenn Childs Jr.	2 episodes
2012	Gayby	Logan	
2012	NYC 22	Daniel Tanner	Episode: "Jumpers"
2013	Law & Order: Special Victims Unit	Joe Dawson	Episode: "Girl Dishonored"
2014	The Americans	Cook	Episode: "Martial Eagle"
