= Wilhelmina Slater =

- Ugly Betty character
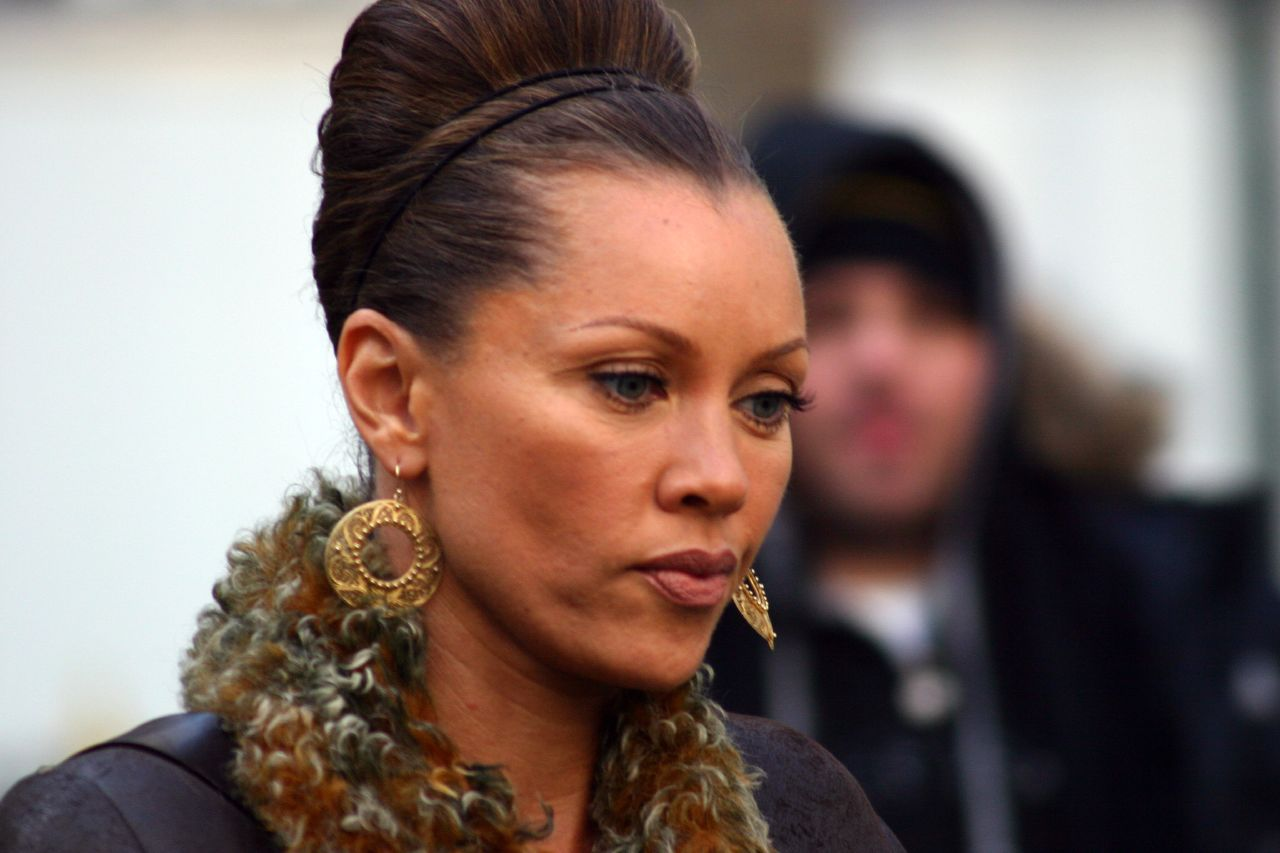
- Vanessa Williams as Wilhelmina Slater
- First appearance: "Pilot" (episode 1.01)
- Last appearance: Hello Goodbye (episode 4.20)
- Created by: Silvio Horta
- Portrayed by: Vanessa Williams

In-universe information
- Full name: Wanda Slater (birth name); Wilhelmina Vivian Slater (full name)
- Nickname: Willie (by Marc)
- Gender: Female
- Occupation: Editor-in-chief of Mode Magazine (2007, 2008, 2010-present); Former; Supermodel (1981–1988) co-editor-in-chief of Mode (with Daniel Meade, 2008–2010); Creative Director at Mode (1988-2007, 2008-2010); Personal assistant (to Fey Sommers; Mode; 1981)
- Family: Senator Slater (father); Victoria Smith-Slater (mother); Renee Slater (sister)
- Significant other: Ted LeBeau (ex-boyfriend); Bradford Meade (ex-fiance; deceased); Connor Owens (boyfriend/fiance/future husband)
- Children: Nico Slater (daughter); William Slater-Meade (former to-be-believed son, with Bradford)
- Nationality: American

Wilhelmina Vivian Slater (born Wanda Slater) is a fictional character in the American dramedy series Ugly Betty. She is played by Vanessa Williams, who received a supporting actress award at the 2007 and 2008 NAACP Image Awards, a Best TV Villain award at the 2007 Teen Choice Awards and a supporting actress nomination at the 59th, 60th, and 61st Primetime Emmy Awards for her portrayal of the character. Her name is similar to Wilhelmina Cooper, a successful model who eventually established her own modeling company in the 1960s. In June 2010, Entertainment Weekly named her one of the 100 Greatest Characters of the Last 20 Years. In July 2012, she was on the #25 list of TV's Greatest Villains of All Time.

== Background ==
Wilhelmina is a conceited, self-absorbed diva and former supermodel who lives for two things: MODE and Botox. During the first two seasons she held the position of creative director of MODE magazine, having been with the magazine since at least 1981, when she was named Wanda and was Fey Sommers' personal assistant. Wanda promised to keep her pregnancy a secret in exchange for being transformed from "mousy assistant Wanda to supermodel Wilhelmina". Her numerous romantic conquests include Mick Jagger. Wilhelmina had numerous cosmetic surgeries, all paid for by Fey, to turn her into a beautiful woman. In 2007, her daughter Nico is sixteen years old, implying that she was born in 1991. If Wilhelmina is the same age as the actress who plays her, then Wilhelmina would have been around 28 years old when she had her first daughter. Nico is rumored to be the daughter of a Dubai prince, and Wilhelmina told Daniel Meade that Nico threw up on Giorgio Armani in 1994. Along with this, Wilhelmina has stated in an interview for MODE that rumors previously flew about her sleeping with "everyone from John F. Kennedy to Madonna", and clarifying the rumors by stating that "only one of them is true".

Twenty-five years later, after Fey's sudden death, she was next in line to become the magazine's editor-in-chief. She is passed over, however, in favor of the less-experienced Daniel Meade, son of Bradford Meade, the Chairman of MODE's publishing company, Meade Publications, whom Wilhelmina thinks is not qualified for the job.

For this reason Wilhelmina launches a series of attempts to derail Daniel, but on account of Betty Suarez, Daniel's assistant, many of Wilhelmina's plans are thwarted. In her many years as Creative Director, she has acquired many minions in the fashion industry (including one from a rival magazine), whom she uses in order to reach her goal of becoming editor-in-chief. She has also kept a series of files on other well known figures, filled with information she could potentially blackmail them with if the need arose.

In the early episodes of the first season, Wilhelmina was also in league with a mysterious bandaged woman, who, as the series progressed, many clues linked to be Fey Sommers. It is finally revealed, however, the mystery woman is actually Alexis Meade, Daniel's older (male to female transgender) sister.

Wilhelmina's plan is revealed when Alexis tells her someone called her from Wilhelmina's office. After learning her assistant Marc was the caller, Wilhelmina is ready to fire him, but she finds herself backed into a corner after she lets slip her takeover plans. Consequently, Wilhelmina agrees to give Marc financial perks in order to keep him from spilling the beans.

Wilhelmina also kept a secret bulletin board in her office of people whom she wants to fire or keep when she takes over MODE. The board is divided into two sides. One side is labeled "In" and has a picture of Wilhelmina. The other side is labeled "Out" and has pictures of Daniel and Betty among those to be fired, as well as Amanda (Although Marc is lobbying to keep her on, Wilhelmina places her there because Amanda has slept with Daniel and believes she still might be attracted to him). Christina was originally placed in between as Wilhelmina was uncertain of her loyalty. She later bribed Christina with the possibility of a career so as to do her dirty work for her.

Wilhelmina's scheme to replace Daniel is again delayed, however, due to an injunction: although Bradford's Will states the elder son would take over Meade publications, Alex has since become Alexis. Wilhelmina refused to work until she becomes editor-in-chief. Despite her threats, the career-minded woman cannot help but find out the goings-on at MODE, so she orders Marc to carry a pot of orchids, in which she has placed a tiny camera, around the office of MODE. After she witnesses Alexis and Daniel bury the hatchet, Wilhelmina realizes Alexis has turned on her: when Alexis tells her she is keeping Daniel on board as editor-in-chief, Wilhelmina ends their partnership and now regards Alexis as an enemy.

When Wilhelmina later finds out that MODE legally belongs to Claire Meade, Bradford's wife, she visits her at the hospital where Claire is detoxing for her hearing. Wilhelmina hopes to manipulate her into signing a Power of Attorney, and she even tempts the alcoholic Claire with vodka on the condition Claire make Wilhelmina editor-in-chief. When Claire does not relent (Claire told her MODE "...will always be run by a Meade"), Wilhelmina resorts to seducing Bradford. She believes by doing this, it will convince Bradford that she can be the next Mrs. Meade, which would allow her to take over MODE. She also assists Bradford in his scheme to get Alexis out of the country by recommending her counterpart at MODE Brasil, Rodrigo, romance her.

In the season finale, Bradford gives Wilhelmina a gaudy engagement ring he designed himself, setting things up for a November 2007 wedding. When Wilhelmina learned Claire escaped while en route to prison, hoping to stop Bradford from marrying Wilhelmina in the second season, she hired a bodyguard named Dwayne, whose "protection" was caught off-guard by Betty and Christina, only to have Wilhelmina force Betty into keeping quiet and not tell Daniel by getting her father Ignacio back into the United States legally. She also manipulated an amnesiac Alexis (who was in the hospital after the car crash she and Daniel were in) into thinking they were still friends by telling her Claire was the one who walked out on Bradford. She also used a tactic at the annual Meade Black & White Ball resulting in Bradford finally telling Claire their marriage was over for good.

However at the wedding, things started unraveling when Daniel found out about Wilhelmina's tryst with her bodyguard (and would later fire Betty for lying to him about it). After he told Bradford about this, Bradford blamed him for trying to stop the nuptials but just as he was about to say "I do," Bradford collapsed of a heart attack. At the hospital Wilhelmina tried to trick him into a quickie wedding with Marc as an ordained minister upon learning she could claim a stake in the company if she was legally married. When Bradford asked her if the affair was true, she didn't make eye contact, and Bradford told her it was over before he died, once again destroying Wilhelmina's schemes of taking over Meade Publications...or so everybody thought.

By using these tactics, along with tricking Daniel into dropping an advertiser because of Alexis (which resulted in a major boycott against MODE), Wilhelmina had already started plans to destroy the magazine and the Meade family altogether by "relaunching" MODE as "Slater" Magazine. But after she was terminated from Meade Publications, Wilhelmina secretly unveiled a virus disk called "Medusa X" and wiped out the entire magazine's database. She then informed Daniel and Alexis she will launch "Slater" as MODE's new competitor and lured the MODE staff over to her side by offering benefits and incentives. Unfortunately, after seeing those plans fall apart due to a lack of finances (her father would not help fund the world that took his daughter away from him), she turns to another scheme, using the sperm of Bradford Meade so she can become pregnant and produce an heir that will give her a piece of the company, as it turns out moments after Bradford's death, she bribed a morgue doctor into acquiring the sperm, which can remain alive for 48 hours, before Bradford was embalmed.

However, she would later learn she has a "hostile womb" and therefore cannot bear any more children. Thanks to Marc's suggestion, they find the perfect surrogate they can control and who is desperately looking for money; Christina. At first Christina turned her down because she didn't want a "Satan Spawn" growing inside her, but after Marc and Wilhelmina burned an expensive dress once owned by Jacqueline Kennedy Onassis, which Christina was intent on selling to a collector, she gave in...and had Betty brought in for support, which upset Wilhelmina.

She also plotted to have her sister committed to an asylum to keep her away from Daniel Meade (whom she was dating), so the Meades would not discover her plans with Christina.

After revealing to the media her baby plans, she was re-instated as Creative Director by Alexis after managing to save "MODE" from possible embarrassment and save Claire Meade's magazine, "Hot Flash", all in the one day.

She later revealed her unborn child to the Meade family and subsequently made a dramatic return to Mode, thanks to Alexis. Wilhelmina became editor-in-chief of Mode magazine, but that position would not last long, as she was demoted back to creative director after sales for the new Mode plunged, thanks in part to Alexis regaining her trust in Daniel and Betty discovering a series of letters Marc gave her on purpose after he felt betrayed by Wilhelmina's ill-fated plan to mold Betty into the next "Wilhelmina".

She uses Christina's being pushed down the stairs to get more media coverage of herself and the un-born baby to make her look more "maternal." She then begins displaying emotion after learning of Christina's husband Stuart's illness and it is definitely terminal. When Christina is in the hospital after being pushed down the stairs by Alexis, she wakes up with Wilhelmina at her side and when photographers are trying to get more photos of a hurt Christina, Wilhelmina gets up and pulls the shade down over the window and then turns and smiles.

Wilhelmina would also use this ploy to get Alexis convicted for attempted murder by forcing Alexis to sell her stake in Meade Publications, only to be turned down after Alexis discovered Wilhelmina had slept with the District Attorney. However, when Claire learned of what Wilhelmina was doing with the DA, Claire made a deal with Wilhelmina by giving her 50% of the company (on condition it goes to the unborn child) and promoted her to co-editor-in-chief of Mode.

Wilhelmina decides to hire a new chief financial officer for the company who is Connor Owens, a playboy whom Daniel seems to dislike which Wilhelmina thinks will give her an advantage. Wilhelmina gets Connor hired only to discover he and Daniel were faking their animosity although it turns out Connor doesn't play favorites with Daniel and wants to do what's best for the magazine. Wilhelmina tries to blackmail Connor but it doesn't work but in the course of their talks, she realizes she's attracted to him. Those plans seem undone when Connor mentions he has a fiancée, Molly. However, when Wilhelmina sees Molly and Daniel flirting at a company retreat, she conceives the idea to push the two together and leave Connor open to her.

Her baby is born at a fashion show on the catwalk after her surrogate could not exit the building except through the runway. Wilhelmina uses the media coverage to her benefit. It is revealed Connor is stealing from the company. Connor asks Wilhelmina to run off with him to an unnamed country, with all the money they'd ever need, and the baby, to start a new life together. Wilhelmina chooses her career instead, and has arranged to turn in Connor, but he left earlier than he indicated, as he suspected she would do this. Wilhelmina tells Betty one can never have it all, as Wilhelmina could not have both career and love.

Late in the third season, doubts surface as to baby William's true parentage. A photographer comments on William's resemblance to her surrogate, Christina. Wilhelmina consults a doctor who tells her William might be Christina's. If Christina and her husband had sexual intercourse at the time of William's conception, a DNA test will be required to determine who William's parents are. Wilhelmina shows Christina fake results, but Christina refuses to believe them and kidnaps William. Betty persuades Wilhelmina to tell the truth, which she does not only publicly, but also secretly to Calvin Hartley, who demands Wilhelmina keep her role at Mode before he will invest in the company. The alternative would be the failure of Meade, so the Meades must accept this deal. William, meanwhile, goes to his real parents.

During the season 3 finale, she discovers Claire Meade had an illegitimate child with Cal Hartley and plans to use this information to force Claire to step out of her sudden position of power. However, Claire artfully fixes the situation for herself and confesses everything to Cal first, including how Wilhelmina used the information for attempted blackmail. As a result, Wilhelmina goes back to being under heavy suspicion with the company. At the end of the finale, she is seen hiring a manhunter to track down Connor, stating she feels the only way she can keep her position in the company is to find Connor...dead or alive, and take back the lost money in order to push Cal out. After the manhunter leaves, she is seen walking into a room, and upon seeing someone, drops her shot glass, obviously shocked at this mystery person's appearance. In the season 4 premiere however, we found out that it was her daughter Nico, who was covered in blood as she had just killed her boyfriend. In Plus None we find out that Nico didn't really kill her boyfriend, she is just trying to extort money from Wilhelmina, with her boyfriend posing as a private investigator blackmailing the Slaters. In desperation, Wilhelmina planned to flee the country with Nico, and resigned from her position at Mode effective after the upcoming "Fearless shoot" in the Bahamas. However, Marc later overheard Nico and her boyfriend scheming, and after initially refusing to believe him, Wilhelmina set a trap for Nico by showing her an expensive family heirloom that they could use to pay off the blackmailer. Nico took the bait, and was caught red-handed and confessed to everything. Wilhelmina later learned from Claire Meade that Connor had been found dead in Panama, and having lost everything, Wilhelmina broke down in tears. After Marc demanded a vacation, Wilhelmina forced Betty into becoming her assistant on the Bahama's trip, but after learning that her rival had taken a job she desired, Wilhelmina momentarily gave up, and began eating cheeseburgers on a private beach, only to be approached by Connor, alive and well. The pair shared a romantic trip together, and planned to escape together, but moments before their boat arrived, the police arrived having received a tip off that Connor was at the hotel, and realizing he had been caught, he insisted that Wilhelmina pretend that she had been the one to turn him in, in order to get her position back at Mode.

Back home, Wilhelmina continues to secretly meet Connor in prison; the perks of having a Senator for a father granting her daily conjugal visits. Wilhelmina, however, pretends to Daniel that she is no longer interested in Connor but that if he re-instates her in her old capacity, she will retrieve the money from Connor, who is still in love with her. The plan pays off and Wilhelmina and Daniel use the recovered Meade money to buy out Cal Hartley.

In "Back in her Place" Connor is becoming increasingly worried that Wilhelmina is becoming too attached and is missing out on her chance at a real life by continuing their relationship whilst he is still in prison. Wilhelmina, in order to prove she is committed to him and will wait as long as it takes, tells him they are getting married. When she shows up in the prison to be married, the guard tells her that Connor was transferred to another prison that morning. Connor has left her a note, in which he says he did it for her, and he loves her too much to put her through this.

In "The Past Presents the Future" Wilhelmina is shot by Tyler, Claire's illegitimate son with Cal Hartley. In the following episodes Wilhelmena makes a recovery from this wound, and awakens to find Connor by her bedside, having talked a guard into releasing him to come see her. He admits he was not transferred but told her this only so she would move on without him, but tells her he realised he can't live without her. The revelation of Connor back in her life makes her want to put the past behind her and become a new woman; however, after this Claire visits her and offers Wilhelmina a bribe to say that Tyler did not shoot her. Insulted by this, she throws Claire out her hospital room and rips up the check. As she is preparing to leave the hospital she tells Marc that she had been prepared to let it all go but after Claire's offer, she now wants to stake claim to the entire company. Marc; tired of his boss's endless scheming, tells her she'll never be happy and leaves her.

Later she announces at a press conference that Claire did not shoot her (as media had speculated due to their fight) and prepares to name Tyler as her assailant. However, seeing Marc in the background brings her to her senses as his earlier words hit home and she instead insists it was an accident, much to Tyler and Claire's relief. In the series finale, Daniel Meade steps down as co-editor-in-chief of Mode and Wilhelmina becomes the sole editor-in-chief of Mode; her goal throughout the series. Daniel realises that Wilhelmina is not entirely a bad person, and that he was handed the job while she truly earned it.

In Wilhelmina's last scene, we see her in prison, talking with Connor. She tells him she has managed to acquire him a new cellmate from whom the FBI need a confession. She assures him that, with his persuasive manner, he can extract a confession, resulting in his sentence being drastically reduced. She seems to have finally turned over a new leaf, ending her feud with Claire, bidding Betty farewell, and vowing to end the schemes. With the job she always wanted, and Connor back by her side, Wilhelmina gets the happiest ending of all.

== Family life ==
Wilhelmina is the daughter of a United States senator, a hard man who is never satisfied with his daughter's achievements. She never addresses him as "father" or "dad" but instead as "The Senator." His reason for not being supportive of Wilhelmina's ambitions is that she had gone on to be cold and distant and she was no longer the daughter he once knew and loved. In "Family/Affair" Betty and Christina see a picture of her with Dick Cheney, suggesting she is a supporter of the Republican Party; in "Bananas for Betty" she admitted she never liked Rudy Giuliani during his mayoral days, but praised him for cleaning up the city. Wilhelmina reveals in "Trust, Lust, and Must" that while she was a student at the Salem Academy, she performed a private dance for Mikhail Baryshnikov. She lives at 33 Fifth Avenue in Manhattan, as seen from the canopy of her apartment building in exterior shots.

She also has a strong-willed teenage daughter, Nico, introduced in the episode "The Lyin', the Watch and the Wardrobe" who has attended a succession of boarding schools and rarely lived with her mother. The name and identity of Nico's father and the length and details of his marriage or romantic involvement with Wilhelmina has never been addressed, but in Nico's first appearance it was mentioned he currently lives in Dubai, implying he is probably extremely wealthy from oil interests. Although, on bettysuarez.com it states Wilhelmina had once dated the Prince of Dubai. It is also implied her father knows of and financially supports Nico but, like Wilhelmina, takes little active interest in his daughter's day-to-day life. Despite their differences, Wilhelmina has shown willingness to improve their relationship, such as cooking a traditional Thanksgiving meal when Nico unexpectedly visited during the holidays, only to learn Nico had made other plans, in one of Wilhelmina's few sympathetic moments. Nico returned after she was suspected of murdering her boyfriend, but was actually hatching a scheme with her boyfriend, who was posing as a detective, to extort money from her mother.

In Bananas for Betty, Wilhelmina revealed she arranged to have Bradford's sperm extracted after his death in "I See Me, I.C.U. She decided to produce an heir, giving herself a third of the Meade fortune and a place at the company again until the heir comes of age. Because she has a hostile womb, she bribed the seamstress Christina McKinney (played by Ashley Jensen), into being her surrogate. The baby boy was born in There's No Place Like Mode.

Wilhelmina's younger sister, Renee (played by Gabrielle Union), was introduced in the episode "A Thousand Words Before Friday". Renee had a night of sex with Daniel Meade who did not know she was Wilhelmina's sister or that he was in Wilhelmina's apartment until the next morning. Wilhelmina implies Renee's birth name is "Rhonda."

The Slaters' first names are based on real names from the world of modeling: The Wilhelmina character is named after the legendary supermodel, who worked with Gia Marie Carangi before her death, and the modeling agency of the same name, while the Nico character is named for the famous Warhol superstar icon.

== Fashion and style ==
Much of Wilhelmina's sophisticated wardrobe revolves around the colors white, silver, gold, and brown in the first two seasons. In a deleted scene from the season 1 DVD, Wilhelmina is seen looking at her closet full of outfits as she tries to rearrange them by the aforementioned colors. In one episode, Wilhelmina is referred to as "A Chanel suit with an office." She is often seen wearing fur, and in an episode where she needed to come up with money for a photographer by selling out of her wardrobe, both lynx, sable, chinchilla and mink is shown amongst her wardrobe. The character is inspired by Vogue editor Anna Wintour, who like Wilhelmina is famous/notorious for her demanding elitism and wearing fur. Wilhelmina's measurements were revealed to be 36–24–36.

== Personality ==
Wilhelmina is portrayed as a mostly villainous character, and she serves as the primary antagonist in the series. She is shown to be a cunning, ruthless and scheming manipulator who uses everybody to her own advantage and is willing to go to any lengths to further her goals of power and domination. She is portrayed as a driven, narcissistic and amoral socialite who readily exploits everyone around her to get what she wants. However, despite her somewhat sociopathic tendencies, Wilhelmina does have a human side to her character. Despite abusing, controlling, deceiving and manipulating virtually everyone around her, she is shown to care for her closest ones, mostly her daughter (despite a tormentous relationship) as shown when she is willing to sacrifice her own career to protect her from going to jail. She also grows to care for Marc whom she eventually calls the "only real man" in her life. Wilhelmina, despite her cold calculating ways, is also shown to be willing to abandon her career to develop relationships with men, as shown in the first season when she readily abandons her scheme with Alexis to pursue a relationship with Ted LeBeau, or when she actively pursues Connor despite his arrest warrant and the implications it'd have on her life to be romantically involved and in cahoots with him. At the end of the series, Wilhelmina ends up putting her scheming ways behind her to "do the right thing.” Because of that, she is rewarded with what she looked for during the whole time at Mode: being the one and only Editor in Chief, which came the one time she didn't plot or connive. She also finally makes peace with the Meades and Betty.

== Minions ==
Originally, Wilhelmina was supposed to be so mean she would fire an assistant every week, but Marc proved to be a popular character and got the job permanently.

Among the people Wilhelmina uses in her scheming besides Marc and Christina (despite having mixed feelings about the latter because of Christina's friendship with Betty) are:

- Philippe Michel, freelance photographer
- Rodrigo Veloso, Creative Director of Brasil MODE
- Carlo Medina, assistant editor/mole at Isabella
- Steve, private detective

== Connections ==
- Nico Slater – Rebellious teenage daughter.
- Alexis Meade – Was her partner in her takeover scheme, but now sees her as a nemesis after turning on her when Alexis decided to repair her relationship with Daniel. Became an ally again once Wilhelmina returned to Mode, but turned on her again after sales plunged and reinstated Daniel again.
- Marc St. James – Her Personal Assistant who knows about her takeover plans and is her best friend and confidant. Despite his loyalty, he felt betrayed after Wilhelmina lured Betty into joining MODE, so thanks to a mailbag of letters that he gave to Betty on purpose, he contributed to getting Wilhelmina demoted back to her creative director position.
- Bradford Meade – Her boss at Meade Publications; Tried to have him framed for Fey's murder, but when that failed after learning Claire was the real culprit, she decided to "romance" him as his wife prepares to face jail time. Thanks to her scheming, Wilhelmina and Bradford were engaged, but he would end it after he found out about her affair with the bodyguard. After his death she took his sperm so she can be impregnated. In the middle of season three Christina McKinney will give birth to what is believed to be his and Wilhelmina's child.
- William Slater-Meade – Until a DNA test revealed he was Christina's, Wilhelmina and Bradford's first and only child. He was born during season three in the episode There's No Place Like Mode, and had three half-siblings.
- Daniel Meade – Co-editor-in-chief at MODE; Main enemy. Drove a wedge between him, Claire and Alexis. She and Daniel briefly came together in Fey's Sleigh Ride and made a pact. That pact faded and they became enemies again. Finally, she tortured Daniel in the cruelest way ever by taking away his position at Mode and making it her own, up until her downfall. Thanks to Claire, he and Wilhelmina now share co-editor-in-chief duties at the magazine. In episode 3.06 "Granny Pants", they went on a blind date Daniel told Betty, who didn't know it was Wilhelmina, "It started up rough but ended up in a good place."
- Betty Suarez – Daniel's assistant. Considers her as an enemy as she stands in the way of Wilhelmina reaching her goals. In the first season she attempted to bribe Betty with a check to help her father but she would have to sell out Daniel; She turned down her offer at first, but in the second season when she attempted to tell Daniel while he was recuperating following his car accident she was going make changes to another issue without him knowing, she gave in by allowing Wilhelmina to help her father return to the United States by not telling Daniel. When Wilhelmina at the helm at Mode in the third season, Betty was tempted by her to rejoin Mode under Wilhelmina, and she did, but resigned after realizing she didn't want to be the next Wilhelmina. Wilhelmina continues to belittle and undermine Betty but, when Betty leaves in the final episode, Wilhelmina ensures they part on good terms by complimenting her spirit, and later admits that she will "miss her".
- Christina McKinney – Seamstress at MODE but Wilhelmina also uses her as her personal seamstress. She is one of Wilhelmina's minions, despite being forced into it, even if it means protecting her friendship with Betty. Wilhelmina controls her future in the fashion industry and described her previous entries of clothing for the fashion show as "a little too bohemian". Christina's responded, "I think your exact words were hippie hideous". Was hired as the surrogate of Wilhelmina and Bradford Meade's child, but was pregnant with her own child instead.
- Claire Meade – Original owner of MODE; Attempted to manipulate her into taking over the magazine's operations by any means at her disposal. Thanks to Wilhelmina's manipulation, Bradford divorced Claire, resulting in Claire's escape en route to prison and her attempt to stop the wedding. Claire would be the one who would have Wilhelmina fired after the wedding fiasco and later witness her firing from the editor-in-chief job at Wilhelmina's party.
- Ted LeBeau – Owner of Beau-Mart (similar to Wal-Mart or K-Mart), a department store chain and single father; Wilhelmina's love interest, who has managed to show Wilhelmina's softer side. Ted has since left her in order to work on his relationship with his wife and children.
- Hilda Suarez – Although she has never come into close contact with Betty's sister, when she did see her and Betty selling Herbalux in the MODE canteen, she described an activist Hilda as "Cesar Chavez in a push-up bra".
- Justin Suarez – While she was temporarily blinded by a "duck sauce" injection to her face à la Botox, he served as her temporary "seeing-eye" guide during Fashion Week when Marc left her temporarily to seek out the next hot fashion item for 2007. During a brief exchange between the two, she called him Jason, but he didn't care what she called him since he said he loved her. He played a major part in helping Wilhelmina's goals by becoming her little "fashion elf" in the second season.
- Amanda Tanen – Receptionist at MODE and the daughter of Fey Sommers; Wilhelmina would like to see her out of a job at the magazine because she slept with Daniel, even though Marc has taken steps to save Amanda's job. Amanda believes Wilhelmina may hold the key to learning the truth about Fey Sommers' personal past.
