= Matt Newton =

American actor (born 1977)

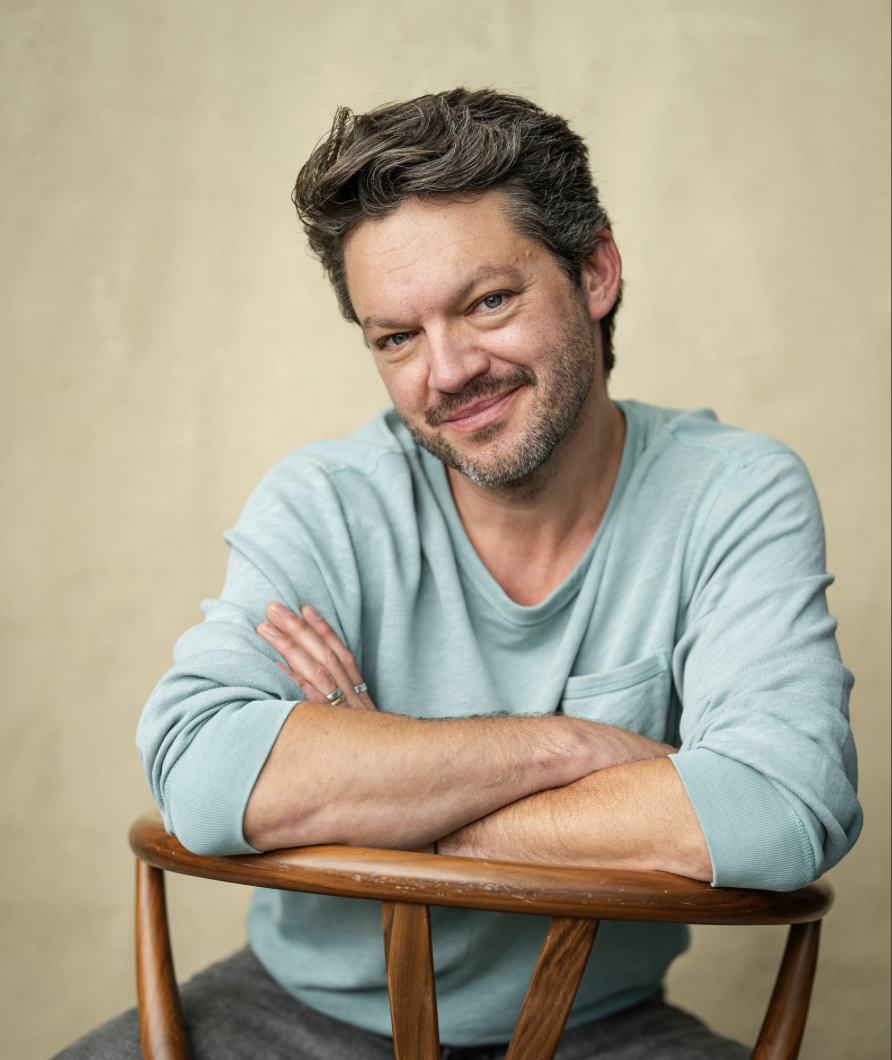
- Newton in 2026
- Born: May 11, 1977 (age 49); New Haven, Connecticut, U.S.
- Occupations: Actor; filmmaker; acting coach
- Years active: 1999–present
- Relatives: Stephanie Chase (aunt), Becki Newton (sister)

Matthew Newton (born May 11, 1977) is an American actor, filmmaker and acting coach.

== Personal life ==
Born in New Haven, Connecticut, Newton was raised in Guilford, Connecticut. He is the son of Thomas Newton and Jennifer Newton (née Chase), whose parents were arranger and composer Bruce Chase and violinist Fannie (née Paschell) Chase. He is of English, Czech, Norwegian, French, and Scottish descent. Newton is a first cousin once removed of the actress Sienna Miller.

He began performing musicals and plays at local theaters while in high school. Following graduation from high school, Newton studied at the Eugene O'Neill Theater Center and Vassar College, from which he graduated with an A.B. in Drama. Newton moved to New York City in 1999 and landed roles in various television series, including that of Alan, the blind football player, in the Comedy Central hit Strangers With Candy, and guest appearances on Judging Amy and Gilmore Girls. His first film role was opposite Jeremy Renner and Bruce Davison in the independent film Dahmer (2002), which was nominated for three Independent Spirit Awards.

His sister, Becki Newton, is an actress who appeared as Amanda Tanen in Ugly Betty, and his brother-in-law, Chris Diamantopoulos, is featured in the television series 24. Newton's mother, Jennifer, is an artist, and his aunt, Stephanie Chase, is a classical violinist. Newton makes his home in New Canaan, CT.

== Career ==
Newton started his professional career as a television and film actor, before becoming a filmmaker and acclaimed acting coach. As an actor, Newton guest starred on Dragnet, Strangers with Candy, Family Law, Dragnet, JAG, Royal Pains, Ugly Betty, Drake and Josh Go Hollywood, Miracles, The Americans, All My Children, Gilmore Girls, and starred in the films Van Wilder, Poster Boy, Dahmer, and The Men Who Stare at Goats, and appeared in countless commercials.

In 2010 Newton started his own acting studio (MN Acting Studio) in NYC, and became a sought after acting coach. His coaching credits include Jessica Jones, Orange is the New Black, Blue Bloods, The Affair, Master of None, and Ava Duvernay’s When They See Us on Netflix.

In 2016 Newton turned to directing, and wrote and produced several short films, including Hide/Seek, Vacation Rental (winner Best Director), Pretty People Inc, and Sins of the Son.

In 2020 Newton published the book The No B.S. Guide to the Acting Biz, which was ranked by Forbes as "Top 5 Books to Read in an Uncertain Market."

== Filmography ==
Film
Year	Title	Role	Notes
2002	Dahmer	Lance Bell	
2002	National Lampoon's Van Wilder	Male Sophomore	Credited as Matthew Newton
2004	Poster Boy	Henry Kray	
2009	The Men Who Stare at Goats	Private Chris	
2009	Peace of Mind	Stephen	Short film
2020	Murder Manual	Quinn	

Television
Year	Title	Role	Notes
2000	Strangers With Candy	Alan Tiresias, the blind football player	Episode: "Behind Blank Eyes"
2000	Family Law	Sean Lundberg	Episode: "Telling Lies"
2000	Judging Amy	Taylor Bradford	Episode: "Gray vs. Gray"
2001	Undressed	Jeff	3 episodes
2002	JAG	P.O. Derrick Newton	Episode: "Odd Man Out"
2002	Gilmore Girls	Jack Springsteen	Episode "Application Anxiety"
2003	Dragnet	Greg Kovik	Episode: "The Big Ruckus"
2003	Miracles	Jimmy	Episode: "The Bone Scatterer"
2004	Anna's Dream	Neil Kennedy	Television film
2005	Criminal Minds	Jordan	Episode: "Broken Mirror"
2006	Drake & Josh Go Hollywood	Deegan	Television film
2007	All My Children	Tom Brennan	2 episodes
2008	Guiding Light	Lawrence	2 episodes
2009–2010	Ugly Betty	Troy	5 episodes
2013	Royal Pains	Jones	Episode: "Game of Phones"
