= Hilda Suarez =

Fictional character

- Ugly Betty character
- First appearance: "Pilot" (episode 1.01)
- Last appearance: "Hello Goodbye" (episode 4.20)
- Created by: Silvio Horta
- Portrayed by: Ana Ortiz

In-universe information
- Alias: Hilda Talercio
- Species: Human
- Gender: Female
- Occupation: Beauty shop owner (Hilda's Beautilities); Former Herbalux employee
- Family: Ignacio Suarez (father); Rosa Suarez (mother; deceased); Betty Suarez (younger sister)
- Spouse: Bobby Talercio (husband; m. 2010-present)
- Significant other: Santos Reynoso (fiance; deceased); Tony Diaz (ex-boyfriend); Archie Rodriguez (ex-boyfriend)
- Children: Justin Suarez (son, with Santos Reynoso)
- Relatives: Yolanda Sálazar (maternal grandmother); Mirta (paternal aunt); Clara (paternal cousin-in-law); Anthony Talercio (father-in-law); Dina Talercio (mother-in-law)
- Religion: Roman Catholic
- Nationality: Mexican American

Hilda Suarez-Talercio is a fictional character in the American dramedy series Ugly Betty, portrayed by Ana Ortiz.

== Description ==
U.S. Catholic magazine describes the character of Hilda Suarez as a "strong, responsible single mom". An analysis of Latinx characters in the media, however, listed Hilda Suarez as an example of the "Latina sex object".

Actress Ana Ortiz described Hilda's fashion style as "part Queens, but a little more wicked than that", with a penchant for "a lot of color and a lot of prints" and wearing a large quantity of accessories.

== Character biography ==
Hilda is Betty's older sister. She became pregnant when she was about 17 years old at her junior prom, and gave birth to her son Justin, who she raised at home with her father and Betty, since Justin's father, Santos, was largely absent from his life.

Despite their clash of wills at times, Hilda is very protective of Betty and the rest of her family. With a fiery temper, she vents her rage at anyone who threatens her family, most notably next door neighbor Gina Gambarro. She expresses jealousy toward her sister, however, since she believes that Ignacio favors Betty. Despite this occasional feeling, her and Betty's relationship remains close.

Although Hilda respects Betty's job choice, she often thinks her sister is being taken advantage of at her job at MODE and feels it provides her with an unstable lifestyle. Nonetheless, Hilda has several times taken advantage of her connections and borrowed clothing and shoes from MODE.

== Storylines ==
Hilda was largely unsuccessful with romantic relationships until she reconciled with her ex-boyfriend (and Justin's father) Santos during the first season, during which they eventually got engaged. However, in the first-season finale, "East Side Story", Hilda was informed Santos had been shot in a convenience store robbery.

Early in the second season, it seemed as if Santos had survived the shooting. However, this was revealed to be a fantasy Hilda had created in her mind to avoid dealing with her devastation.

In season 2, Hilda finds a new love interest, "Coach" Tony Diaz who happens to be Justin's P.E. teacher. They have a rocky start when they first meet in the episode "Betty's Baby Bump", but eventually agree to go out with each other in The Kids Are Alright",.

In the season 2 finale, "Jump", Hilda learns that Tony is married, but he assures her that the relationship is over. However, when Tony's ex wife comes to see Hilda, Hilda decides to end the relationship. In the third season she begins to date politician Archie Rodriguez. Their relationship goes well until a boyfriend from her high school days, Bobby Talercio, shows up. Bobby admits that he still has feelings for Hilda when helping her with a problem. They later sleep together. In the Christmas episode, Hilda and Betty both think they are pregnant due to a mix-up with the pregnancy tests but later it is revealed that Hilda is the one expecting a baby. Hilda tells Betty that Bobby is the baby's father. Archie, not knowing about either the affair or the pregnancy, breaks up with Hilda. In the episode, "The Passion of the Betty" Hilda tells Bobby she is pregnant, he freaks out and leaves. Soon after he comes to their house and tells her he is a good guy and that he wants to be involved in their child's life, as much as Hilda wants him to be. Bobby started "Hilda Week" because she was always taking care of everyone else in her life, except for herself. It seems that Bobby and Hilda are back together because she kissed him outside the "Ace of Base" building. In "Blackout!", Hilda, Bobby, Betty, and Ignacio go to the doctor's to see a sonogram of the baby, but the doctor discovers there is no heartbeat. In the end of "Fire and Nice", Bobby proposes to Hilda after she gets to better know his parents and they figure they can get through anything together. Bobby and Hilda married in the series' penultimate episode, "The Past Presents the Future." In the final episode, "Hello Goodbye", Hilda and Bobby announced their plans to move into their own apartment.

=== Employment ===
Hilda's employment history has been very unstable. According to Hilda's resume in the episode In or Out, her previous jobs included "Primary Skewer Girl" at "Zucchini on a Skewer" in New Haven, Connecticut. The resume also says she went to elementary school in New Haven, but graduated high school in Jackson Heights, New York.

At one point during season one, Hilda tried to recruit Betty to join her in a new venture, selling door-to-door products from "Herbalux", a health supplement company based in Poland. Later, she found herself out of a job after Herbalux was closed down by the FDA and the company itself became the target of a lawsuit filed by a woman in New Jersey after she lost her hair using a hand créme days before her wedding.

Later, after Santos' death, a devastated Hilda became housebound and spent most of her time with elderly ladies. Finally, she was convinced to follow her true passion and she became a beautician after graduating from cosmetology school. She would later start her own beauty salon, "The Sweet Hairafter" (later renamed "Hilda's Beautilities") thanks to Justin selling his Playbill collection.

== Character relationships ==
- Archie Rodriquez - NYC City Councilman, Hilda's ex-boyfriend.
- Walter Tabachnik - Betty's former on-again/off-again boyfriend; Hilda was more friendly to him and thought he should be with Betty. She was also trying to ensure Walter and Betty remain a couple and went as far as keeping a message Henry left away from Betty. Now she is aware of her sister's feelings towards her co-worker. She backed off after realizing Betty can make own decisions now that Walter has left for a new job in Maryland.
- Santos - Her on-again/off-again boyfriend and Justin's father; her father Ignacio would rather see him stay away from the family because of his gambling problems and ruining Hilda's life. He has been an absent father to Justin; when he does spend time with him, he appears uncomfortable and seems unable to tolerate his son's mannerisms, telling his mother he needs to act like a "normal boy." This angers Hilda and breaks up with him as a result. Hilda still loves him but broke it off with him when she became pregnant with Justin because she didn't want Santos to see him. Santos is a terrible role model, but he has a good heart. The show suggests he is poor and lives in an unstable environment. He often gets in fights. He begins to come around more often and even accepting of his son; he takes Justin to see Hairspray and buys him a calendar filled with facts about Broadway. In "Petra-Gate" he asked Hilda to marry him and she said yes. In the season 1 finale, he was shot and killed while defending others against a gunman during a hold up in a convenience store.
- Gina Gambarro - Next door neighbor; she and Hilda have been sworn enemies since they were kids. Hilda also blames her for trying to break up Walter and Betty, even though it was Walter who started it.
- Leah Stillman - Lawyer; Hilda thought that she would help Ignacio in his immigration case but played her for a fool by taking the money Hilda gave her and disappearing afterwards.
- Tony Diaz - Hilda and Tony dated for a while, but Hilda ended the relationship because Tony's wife asked her to get another chance with Tony.
- Bobby Talercio - Hilda's first flame from high school and Justin's part-time drivers ed teacher. His return rekindles Hilda's relationship with this former bad boy, even though Betty also had a crush on him. He later comes clean that he still had feelings for Hilda and end up sleeping together, which resulted in Hilda becoming pregnant with his child.
