= Crush'd =

- Ugly Betty episode
- Episode no.: Season 3 Episode 7
- Directed by: Victor Neili, Jr.
- Written by: Tracy Poust & Jon Kinnally
- Production code: 307
- Original air date: November 6, 2008

Episode chronology
← Previous "Ugly Berry"	Next → "Tornado Girl"
- Ugly Betty season 3

"Crush'd" is the seventh episode of the third season, the 48th episode overall, of the American dramedy series Ugly Betty, which aired on November 6, 2008. The episode was written by Tracy Poust and Jon Kinnally and directed by Victor Neili Jr.

== Plot ==
As the morning starts, Betty decides to go to work early, hoping to grasp the attention of her neighbor, Jesse, who comes home around the same time Betty leaves for work. As she arrives at work, Betty is stunned to find Amanda staying overnight at Mode as she has been evicted from her apartment due to her financial instability. Betty suggests that Amanda ask her friends to help her look for a new place. Betty is determined to win over her crush, and goes as far as even listening to his demos like they are love letters and talks him up so much that even Daniel starts to tease her. However, Amanda lands at Betty's doorstep with Halston in tow asking to become Betty's new roommate, admitting that she had no one else to turn to. Unfortunately, this unlikely pairing is way beyond The Odd Couple, as she borrows Betty's clothes (a blouse becomes a belted dress; leggings become a skin-tight number), eats all her food and keeps her awake at night with her demands.

However, Amanda seems to have untapped potential as she actually comes up with a few good ideas. Once she becomes aware that Betty has a crush on one of her neighbors but not whom, she suggests she invite him to the Mode "Fashion Heats Up" party. When Betty invites Jesse, he assumes that she wants his band, "Dark Sexual Journey", to play. However, she later discovers that Daniel has already booked Mariah Carey for the party. Amanda then suggests that Betty hold an after-party on her rooftop and invite her crush's band to play there, while at the same time using it as a get-out-of-debt scheme for Amanda's debt. She also reworks Betty's colorful invitation flyers and advertises the party through elite guerrilla marketing to make the employees think it is an exclusive VIP party to pique their interest. The ploy works and the party becomes a success. With help from the family, Betty comes up with a Mexican-style theme for the over 300 people that will show up at the event.

On the Mode front, both Daniel and Wilhelmina are having problems with their new CFO, Connor. Daniel expects Connor, as his friend, to bow to his wishes, which means not selling any of the Meade Publication titles to offset their deficit, which was one of Connor's suggestions. When Wilhelmina becomes suspicious of Daniel and Connor becoming fast friends, Daniel comes clean about their partnership. Having been duped by Daniel, Wilhelmina is all set to blackmail Connor to get her way, but unexpectedly develops a crush on him, which has Marc taking notes. However behind the scenes, Claire warns Daniel that he should be careful around Connor, even when Connor is around Wilhelmina.

Later that evening on the way to the after-party, Daniel and Claire learn that Connor has gone ahead and sold off several of Meade's publications meeting with Conde Nast Publications while watching Fashion TV. Also showing up for the event is Wilhelmina, who is stunned that the event is being held on Betty's rooftop. At this point she sees Connor and tries to confront him, but Daniel also sees Connor as well and is ready to confront him, too. Fed up by the two co-EICs, Connor finally stands up for himself, admitting that he met with Conde Nast Publications to sell a few of Mode's properties and then listing all his bad decisions in his life that Wili might have used to blackmail him, and tells both of them that he is "nobody's bitch". Later, Wilhelmina apologizes to Connor and at the same time hopes sparks will fly, but after he accepts, he gets a call on his phone from his fiancée. As he leaves, Wili is crushed as she still feels something for Connor.

At the rooftop party, Jesse and his band wows the crowd with their set and even Betty is thrilled to see him perform, even after dedicating a song to a "special girl," which Betty thinks is about her. After he finishes his set Betty looks for Jesse at his apartment, only to walk in on Amanda making out with Jesse. The stunned Betty then confronts Amanda for moving in on Jesse and tells her that she is throwing Amanda out of the apartment. As Betty cries her heart out outside the building, Daniel sees her and reassures her that she will always be a beautiful woman even if her heart gets broken. Hours later, Amanda, realizing why this was so upsetting, gives the proceeds to Betty for rent money and assures her that Jesse is not worth it. She then apologizes for what happened and the two make up with Betty allowing her to stay by helping clean up the apartment.

Marc's relationship with Cliff has taken on a rocky situation, as Cliff proposes that they move in together, which completely freaks out Marc, who is unsure and goes as far as avoiding Cliff. His obvious reluctance shows, and when Cliff does not get an answer from Marc, Cliff takes off in a huff. Later, during the after-party, Marc, upset over not giving Cliff an answer and not hearing from Cliff for three days, has a tryst with a guy he meets at the event. As he is leaving the guy's apartment, Cliff catches up with him and apologizes for all the pressure he had been putting on him. In a panic, Marc proposes marriage, on the spot, to Cliff. As they hug, Marc is in shock after Cliff accepts.

As the dawn breaks, Betty walks into the rooftop and sees Wilhelmina, who asks Betty to sit down next to her and share a drink while watching the sunrise.

== Reception ==
This episode generally received very good reviews.

In a review from Entertainment Weekly, Tanner Stransky quotes, "On last night's stellar Ugly Betty, both Jesse (Val Emmich) and Betty (America Ferrera) uttered a catchphrase I'll be incorporating into my vernacular: "You're a snow day." How sweet is that? So simple and so powerful all at the same time. I'm just thinking about how, especially back in my school days, a snow day would make everything better. And that's the idea here, obvs."

As with the previous episode, Television Without Pity also gave this one a A+ for returning to its first season roots: "I rarely think about it when I give the A+, because I basically always give the A+, because I think quantifying art is, if not impossible, at the most subjective to a sort of horrifying degree. At what point do you go from "I liked it" to "it was good"? I don't trust myself to be accurate about that; I feel like it's enough to enjoy the ride they're putting me on as much as possible and getting as much out of it as I can. That way, the burden's on them. Having said that? Best episode in the last year and a half, possibly best altogether since the first season."

== Ratings ==
The episode scored a 5.8/9 rating and a 2.7/7 in 18-49s with 9 million viewers overall, an increase of 400,000 viewers from the previous episode. and also the best ratings since the season premiere, The Manhattan Project.

== Also starring ==
- Val Emmich as Jesse
- David Blue as Cliff St. Paul
- Grant Bowler as Connor Owens

== See also ==
- Ugly Betty
- Ugly Betty season 3
