= Regis Philbin filmography =

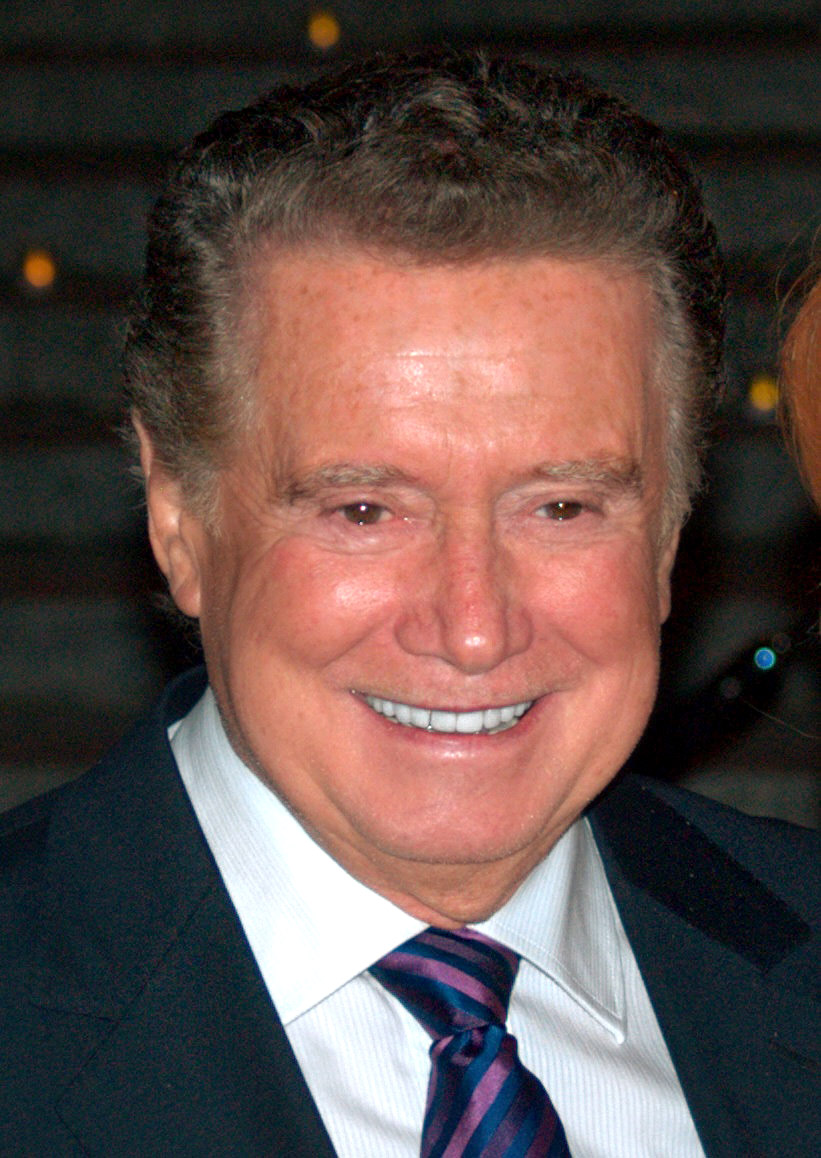
Philbin in 2009

Regis Philbin (August 25, 1931 – July 25, 2020) was an American media personality, actor, and singer, known for hosting talk and game shows since the 1960s. Philbin holds the Guinness World Record for the most hours on U.S. television.

== Filmography ==
=== Film ===
Year	Title	Role	Notes
1972	Everything You Always Wanted to Know About Sex* (*But Were Afraid to Ask)	Himself	
1978	Sextette	Himself	
1978	The Bad News Bears Go to Japan	Harry Hahn	
1983	The Man Who Loved Women	Himself	
1985	Malibu Express	Himself	
1990	Funny About Love	Himself	
1992	Night and the City	Himself	
1993	The Emperor's New Clothes	Emperor (voice)	
1996	Open Season	Himself	
1999	Torrance Rises	Himself	
1999	Dudley Do-Right	Himself	
2000	Little Nicky	Himself	
2001	See How They Run	Himself	Documentary
2002	Roberto Benigni's Pinocchio	Ringmaster (voice)	
2002	People I Know	Himself	
2003	Cheaper by the Dozen	Himself	
2004	Welcome to Mooseport	Himself	
2004	The Breakup Artist	Himself	
2005	Miss Congeniality 2: Armed and Fabulous	Himself	
2006	Little Miss Sunshine	Himself (voice)	Uncredited
2007	Mr. Warmth: The Don Rickles Project	Himself	Documentary
2007	Shrek the Third	Mabel (voice)	Cameo
2008	The Great Buck Howard	Himself	
2010	New York Street Games	Himself	Documentary
2010	Just Laugh!	Himself	Documentary
2010	Shrek Forever After	Mabel (voice)	Cameo
2011	Jack and Jill	Himself	Final film role

=== Television ===
Year	Title	Role	Notes
1962	The Tonight Show	Guest Host	Talk show
1964–1965	That Regis Philbin Show	Host	Talk show
1967–1969	The Joey Bishop Show	Sidekick / Announcer	Talk show
1968	The Big Valley	Reporter	Episode: "The Challenge"
1968	Cowboy in Africa	Bernie Levine	Episode: "African Rodeo"
1968	Get Smart	Bakery Counter Clerk	Episode: "The Hot Line"
1968	It's Happening	Himself	2 episodes
1968	The Don Rickles Show	Himself	Episode: "#1.4"
1968	Rowan & Martin's Laugh-In	Himself	Episode: "#1.9"
1968	The Danny Thomas Hour	Customer	Episode: "Two for Penny"
1969, 1971	Love, American Style	Frederick Miller	2 episodes
1970	That Girl	Ron Rouser	Episode: "That Cake"
1970	The Silent Force	Disc Jockey	Episode: "The Wax Jungle"
1972	The Jimmy Stewart Show	Johnny Crown	Episode: "Jim's Decision"
1973	The Karen Valentine Show	Himself	Television special
1975	The People's Lawyer	Himself	Television film
1975–1976	The Neighbors	Host	65 episodes
1975–1981	A.M. Los Angeles	Co-Host	Talk show
1976	Almost Anything Goes	Field Interviewer	Episode: "Bisbee vs. Douglas vs Nogales"
1977	SST: Death Flight	Harry Carter	Television film
1977	Mad Bull	Raymond Towne	Television film
1977	The San Pedro Beach Bums	Emcee	Episode: "Sweepstakes Bums"
1978	CHiPs	Newscaster	Episode: "Disaster Squad"
1978	Lucan	Tourist	Episode: "Thunder God Gold"
1979	Mirror, Mirror	TV Host	Television film
1979, 1983	Fantasy Island	Radio Announcer / Craig Samuels	2 episodes
1980	Steve Martin: Comedy Is Not Pretty!	Public Service Announcer	Television special
1981	True Life Stories	Host	Television film
1981	Battle of the Las Vegas Show Girls	Host	Television special
1981–1982	Password Plus	Himself	6 episodes
1981–1982	The Regis Philbin Show	Co-Host	Talk show
1982	Star of the Family	TV Host	Episode: "Quiet Kind of Hero"
1983–1988	The Morning Show	Co-Host	Talk show
1984–1987	Regis Philbin's Lifestyles	Host	Talk show
1985	California Girls	Himself	Television film
1986	New Love, American Style	Co-Star	Episode: "Love and Alimony"
1987–1988	The New Hollywood Squares	Himself	4 episodes
1988	Ryan's Hope	Malachy Malone	3 episodes
1988–2000	Live with Regis and Kathie Lee	Co-Host	Talk show
1991	WrestleMania VII	Commentator / Interviewer	Television special
1991–1996	Miss America	Co-Host	Television specials
1991, 2005	All My Children	Himself	2 episodes
1992, 1998, 2006	Celebrity Jeopardy!	Himself	3 episodes
1993	Mad About You	Himself	Episode: "The Man Who Said Hello"
1993–2015	Late Show with David Letterman	Himself	136 episodes
1994	Kung Fu: The Legend Continues	Himself	Episode: "May I Ride with You"
1994	The Larry Sanders Show	Himself	Episode: "Like No Business I Know"
1994	Seinfeld	Himself	Episode: "The Opposite"
1995	The Cosby Mysteries	Himself	Episode: "Big Brother Is Watching"
1995	Hope & Gloria	Himself	Episode: "Listen, Sister"
1995	Women of the House	Himself	Episode: "Dear Diary"
1996	The Fresh Prince of Bel-Air	Himself	Episode: "I, Stank Hole in One"
1996	Life's Work	Glen Bradley	Episode: "Fired"
1997	Mother Goose: A Rappin' and Rhymin' Special	Jack (voice)	Television film
1997	Second Noah	Himself	Episode: "Diving In"
1997, 1999, 2000	Spin City	Himself / Rags the Dog	4 episodes
1998	Caroline in the City	Himself	Episode: "Caroline and the Sandwich"
1998	The Simpsons	Himself	Episode: "Treehouse of Horror IX"
1998	Soul Man	Himself	Episode: "Grabbed by an Angel"
1998	Hercules	Typhon (voice)	Episode: "Hercules and the Return of Typhon"
1998	Diagnosis: Murder	Darrin Tate	Episode: "Talked to Death"
1999	LateLine	Himself	Episode: "Pearce on Conan"
1999	The Famous Jett Jackson	Himself	Episode: "New York"
1999–2002	Who Wants to Be a Millionaire	Host	Game show
2000	2 Minute Drill	Himself	Episode: "December 25, 2000"
2000–2001	Live with Regis	Co-Host	Talk show
2001	Becker	Homeless Man	Episode: "Small Wonder"
2001–2011	Live with Regis and Kelly	Co-Host	Talk show
2002	Family Guy	Himself (voice)	Episode: "Family Guy Viewer Mail #1"
2003, 2005, 2006	Hope & Faith	Hal Halverson	3 episodes
2004	Who Wants to Be a Super Millionaire	Host	12 episodes
2004	Lilo & Stitch: The Series	Himself (voice)	Episode: "Drowsy"
2005	Less than Perfect	Xin Xao Pi	Episode: "Get Away"
2005	Dick Clark's New Year's Rockin' Eve	Guest Host	Television special
2006	This Is Your Life	Host	Unsold pilot
2006	America's Got Talent	Host	11 episodes
2006	Deal or No Deal	Himself	Episode: "#1.35"
2007	The Knights of Prosperity	Himself	Episode: "Operation: Oswald Montecristo"
2007	Are You Smarter than a 5th Grader?	Himself	Episode: "Regis Philbin and Clay Aiken"
2008	Ugly Betty	Himself	Episode: "The Manhattan Project"
2008	How I Met Your Mother	Himself	Episode: "The Best Burger in New York"
2008–2009	Million Dollar Password	Host	12 episodes
2009	Brothers & Sisters	Himself	Episode: "Sibling Rivalry"
2009	Damages	Himself	Episode: "I Lied, Too"
2009	Who Wants to Be a Millionaire: 10th Anniversary Celebration	Host	Television special
2010	37th Daytime Emmy Awards	Host	Television special
2011	Take Two with Phineas and Ferb	Himself	Episode: "Regis Philbin"
2011	30 Rock	Himself	Episodes: "100: Part 1" and "100: Part 2"
2011	WWE Tribute to the Troops	Himself	Television special
2011	Celebrity Ghost Stories	Himself	Episode: "June 18, 2011"
2011	The Marriage Ref	Himself	Episode: "Episode 14"
2011	Cake Boss	Himself	Episode: "A Funny Regis & Fifty Weddings"
2012	Piers Morgan Tonight	Guest Host	Aired May 29, 2012
2012	Hot in Cleveland	Pierre	2 episodes
2012	Macy's Fourth of July Fireworks Spectacular	Host	Television special
2012	The Haunting of...	Himself	Episode: "Regis Philbin"
2012, 2014–2016	Today	Guest Co-Host	Talk show
2012–2017	Rachael Ray Show	Guest Co-Host	Talk show
2013	The Talk	Guest Co-Host	3 episodes
2013–2014	Crowd Goes Wild	Host	Talk show
2015	The Late Late Show	Guest Host	2 episodes
2015	New Girl	Himself	Episode: "Clean Break"
2015	The Odd Couple	Walter	Episode: "Enlightening Strikes"
2016	Uncle Grandpa	Easter Bunny (voice)	Episode: "Uncle Easter"
2016	Tony Bennett Celebrates 90	Himself	Television special
2017	Home & Family	Guest Co-Host	5 episodes
2017	Game Changers	Himself	Television film
2017	The Joker's Wild	Himself	2 episodes
2019	Fresh Off the Boat	Himself	Episode: "Lou Wants to Be a Millionaire"
2020	Who Wants To Be A Millionaire? Secrets & Surprises	Himself	Television special
2020	Single Parents	Himself	Episode: "Oh Dip, She's Having a Baby" (Final appearance)
