= Ugly Berry =

- Ugly Betty episode
- Episode no.: Season 3 Episode 6
- Directed by: Ron Underwood
- Written by: Bill Wrubel
- Production code: 306
- Original air date: October 30, 2008

Episode chronology
| ← Previous "Granny Pants" | Next → "Crush'd" |
- Ugly Betty season 3

"Ugly Berry" is the sixth episode in the third season, the 47th episode overall, of the American dramedy series Ugly Betty, which aired on October 30, 2008. The episode was written by Bill Wrubel and directed by Ron Underwood.

The fictitious "Tico Berry" used in the episode is represented by the Rambutan.

== Plot ==
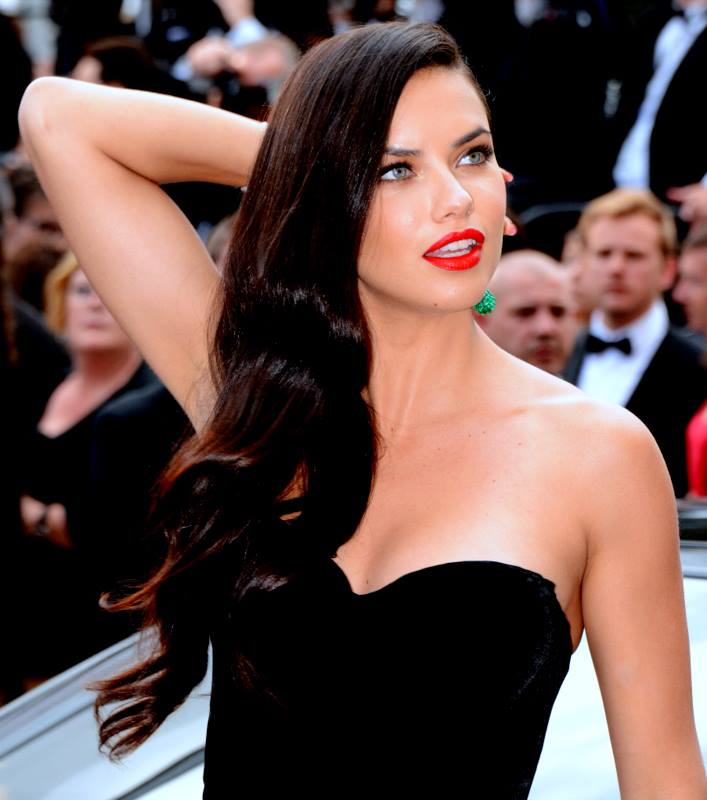
Adriana Lima guest stars as Herself.

Realizing that they have created a monster, both Marc and Amanda join forces with Betty to destroy Kimmie Keegan's career at MODE and sabotage a photo shoot with Adriana Lima. Meanwhile, at the Suarezes, Ignacio prepares for his first chance to vote while Hilda capitalizes on the elections to boost business in her beauty salon only to be caught by a New York councilman. In the meantime, Daniel meets MODE's new Chief Financial Officer, Connor Owens.

== Ratings ==
The episode was watched by 8.6 million viewers in the United States, averaging a 5.6/9 rating overall and a 2.5/7 among 18-49s.

== Also starring ==
- Lindsay Lohan as Kimmie Keegan
- David Blue as Cliff St. Paul
- Val Emmich as Jesse
- Alec Mapa as Suzuki St. Pierre

== Guest starring ==
- Adriana Lima as herself
- Grant Bowler as Connor Owens

== See also ==
- Ugly Betty
- Ugly Betty season 3
