= Ugly Betty season 3 =

Ugly Betty
- Season 3
- Promotional poster
- No. of episodes: 24

Release
- Original network: ABC
- Original release: September 25, 2008 – May 21, 2009

Season chronology
- ← Previous; Season 2 Next → Season 4

The third season of the American comedy-drama television series Ugly Betty was confirmed by ABC on February 11, 2008. The season premiere aired on September 25, 2008, while the season ended with a special double episode on May 21, 2009.

In Australia, season 3 premiered on 3 November 2009, as one of the first exclusive premieres on the new digital channel 7TWO, after two years on the Seven Network. Season 3 premiered on Tuesday 13 January 2009 in South Africa and on Wednesday 24 June 2009 in the UK.

The season would be the first to be produced in the show's actual setting, New York City, in an attempt to take advantage of a credit change.

== Cast ==
Most of the main cast from the show's second season returned for the third season, with former main characters Alexis Meade (played by Rebecca Romijn) and Henry Grubstick (played by Christopher Gorham), becoming recurring characters.

=== Main cast ===
- America Ferrera as Betty Suarez
- Eric Mabius as Daniel Meade
- Judith Light as Claire Meade
- Vanessa L. Williams as Wilhelmina Slater
- Becki Newton as Amanda Tanen
- Ana Ortiz as Hilda Suarez
- Ashley Jensen as Christina McKinney
- Tony Plana as Ignacio Suarez
- Michael Urie as Marc St. James
- Mark Indelicato as Justin Suarez

=== Recurring cast ===
- Christine Baranski as Victoria Hartley
- David Blue as Cliff St. Paul
- Grant Bowler as Connor Owens
- Julian de la Celle as Daniel Jr.
- Eddie Cibrian as Coach Tony Diaz
- Val Emmich as Jesse
- Daniel Eric Gold as Matt Hartley
- Christopher Gorham as Henry Grubstick
- Sarah Lafleur as Molly
- Lindsay Lohan as Kimberly ‘Kimmie’ Keegan
- Ralph Macchio as Councilman Archie Rodriguez
- Alec Mapa as Suzuki St. Pierre
- Bernadette Peters as Jodie Papadakis
- David Rasche as Calvin Hartley
- Derek Riddell as Stuart
- Rebecca Romijn as Alexis Meade
- Lauren Vélez as Elena Sanchez

=== Guest cast ===
- Nikki Blonsky as Teri O’Shoughnessy
- Barry Bostwick as Roger Adams
- Mark Consuelos as Det. Averaimo
- Rachel Dratch as Penny Meadows & Mindy Meadows
- Max Ehrich as Randy
- Max Greenfield as Nick Pepper
- Cheyenne Jackson as Timothy D’Artagnan
- Mo Rocca as the Kitchen Rumble Host
- Freddy Rodriguez as Giovanni ‘Gio’ Rossi
- Steve Schirripa as Frankie Burrata
- Michael Stuhlbarg as Heinrich
- Heather Tom as Holly Wright

In addition, the season featured cameo appearances by Adele, Mark Badgley and James Mischka, Nigel Barker, Joy Behar and Elisabeth Hasselbeck, Billie Jean King, Adriana Lima, Rachel Maddow, Isaac Mizrahi, Roberta Myers, Regis Philbin and Kelly Ripa, Zac Posen, Antonio Sabàto Jr., Liz Smith, Robert Verdi, and Joe Zee as themselves.

== Music ==
- ABC released a promotional video featuring the cast singing "New York, New York".
- Australian singer Lenka made a music video of "The Show" showing never-before-seen footage from the third season of Ugly Betty.
- The iTunes Store provided a free music download of both of these features.
- At the end of episode 3, Two of Cups's "Breathe" was played.
- In episode 10, "Bad Amanda", an unreleased track by Lady Gaga titled "Fashion" can be heard.
- In the episode, "When Betty Met YETI", Lady Gaga's "Poker Face" can be heard.
- In the episode "Curveball", another Lady Gaga song, "The Fame", can be heard.

== Production ==
During production of season 2, the ideas for both a musical episode and a recurring guest role for Lindsay Lohan came up. Both ideas were put on hold due to the 2007–2008 Writers Guild of America strike and in the end, only Lindsay Lohan's storyline came to fruition, with Lohan making a brief uncredited cameo appearance in the season two finale "Jump", before reprising the role in season 3.

Shooting of the episodes moved from Los Angeles to on-location shooting in New York City, where the show was set. The last time the show was shot in New York was in the pilot episode. In addition, the season had more physical elements, especially for Betty.

In an interview about the new direction the series would be taking, Silvio Horta told E!'s Kristin Dos Santos at an ABC press meeting for its show runners: “This season is going to be about growing up. We aren't going to be doing anymore child-like storylines. It is going to be about moving Betty forward." He then added more details to MediaWeek about the changes: "On Ugly Betty I think we started to veer a little too much into the romantic storyline, where it started to really become the show. And it started to just get away from what I originally wanted to do and where we originally started, which was about a girl making it in the city and her work life. So we're trying to refocus that back. But there's always temptation and you want to explore it. You want to have the opportunity to explore it. And the second you start getting too involved in it, it's like any plot line. You go in; it's very hard to get out and it takes a little longer." He later revealed that the audience would see a more evolving Betty: "Betty will solve a crime. Inject Botox. Get attacked by an animal. Throw a Wilhelmina mannequin down a flight of stairs. And that's just the first three episodes."

== Casting changes ==
It was announced before the season aired that Rebecca Romijn would only be returning as a recurring character because of Romijn's dissatisfaction with the direction in which the writers had taken her character. It was speculated that the move was also, partially, due to Romijn's pregnancy, although TV Guide's Michael Ausiello reported that it might have been a ploy to ask for a salary increase.

Christopher Gorham (Henry Grubstick) revealed to TV Guide that "the show is moving, I am not." On July 11, 2008, TV Guide confirmed that Gorham and Freddy Rodriguez would be moving on from Betty as the two actors would be making their last appearances due to other commitments; especially Gorham, who began working on CBS' Harper's Island. However, in a Q&A submitted to Ausiello at his webpage at Entertainment Weekly, he asked Ferrera about the absence of the two actors after they were no-shows at the Season 3 premiere party in New York City on September 12, 2008: "Betty's decision at the beginning of this season is not an ending to anything," Ferrera insisted. "It's more about huge beginnings for her. Christopher [Gorham], who we love and adore, and Freddy [Rodriguez], who is wonderful and so great on our show, are not gone [forever]. You'll never know when they'll pop in or pop out, but they'll be around."

== Episodes ==
No. overall	No. in season	Title	Directed by	Written by	Original release date	U.S. viewers (millions)
42	1	"The Manhattan Project"	Victor Nelli, Jr.	Silvio Horta	September 25, 2008	9.77
Betty's had enough of her love triangle and decides not to choose either Gio or Henry but decides to go on a vacation of her own. Daniel and Claire are furious with Alexis. Alexis and Wilhelmina promote the new issue of Mode on Live with Regis and Kelly. Kimmie is back and works with Ignacio at a fast-food restaurant and decides to make things right with Betty.
43	2	"Filing for the Enemy"	Michael Spiller	Joel Fields	October 2, 2008	8.58
Realizing that Betty is starting to lose trust in Daniel following his enrollment in Player Magazine, Wilhelmina schemes to take Betty away from Daniel and make Betty her assistant, causing a rift between Marc and Betty. Daniel faces a custody battle for Daniel Jr. while Hilda and Tony's illicit romance heats up. Christina becomes suspicious of Stuart taking drugs again and decides to take a secret DNA test which comes out as positive! But their confrontation would turn ugly when someone pushes Christina down a flight of stairs at Mode.
44	3	"Crimes of Fashion"	Victor Nelli, Jr.	Henry Alonso Myers	October 9, 2008	8.48
The police arrest Daniel on suspicion of pushing Christina down the stairs, but Betty does not believe he is guilty and tries to find the real culprit. Stuart visits a hospitalized Christina and tells her his treatment is not working. Ignacio learns something shocking about Tony while Alexis finally reveals a dark secret about Daniel Jr.'s biological family.
45	4	"Betty Suarez Land"	Michael Spiller	Chris Black	October 16, 2008	8.21
Betty is thrilled that Gio is back from his trip from Rome but Gio's unhappy that Betty did not go with him, starting a feud. While attempting to win Gio's heart back, Betty is forced to help keep Daniel Meade Jr. away from his grandparents who have already filed a custodial claim and has come to New York to get their grandson back, devastating Daniel. Meanwhile, Alexis is charged for attempted murder because of a scheming Willie which frustrates Claire.
46	5	"Granny Pants"	Fred Savage	Sheila Lawrence	October 23, 2008	8.66
Betty's shocked to find her old school bully, Kimmie (guest star: Lindsay Lohan) is trying to find a new job at Mode and Betty, being too nice, helps her but does not know that it is all a scheme. Daniel and Wilhelmina argue about Mode's newest cover issue while Justin signs up for a musical but discovers his bully is also doing the same.
47	6	"Ugly Berry"	Ron Underwood	Bill Wrubel	October 30, 2008	8.55
Realising that they have created a monster, both Marc and Amanda join forces with Betty to destroy Kimmie Keegan's career at MODE and sabotage a photo shoot with Adriana Lima. Meanwhile at the Suarezes, Ignacio prepares for his first chance to vote while Hilda capitalizes on the elections to boost business in her beauty salon only to be caught by a New York councilman. In the meantime, Daniel meets MODE's new Chief Financial Officer, Connor Owens (played by Grant Bowler).
48	7	"Crush'd"	Victor Nelli, Jr.	Tracy Poust & Jon Kinnally	November 6, 2008	8.95
Betty becomes more infatuated with her neighbour Jesse but her romantic intentions are interrupted by a bankrupt Amanda who soon moves in with her and they become a modern day odd couple. Marc begins to avoid Cliff once a proposal to live together is brought up and ends up sleeping with another man. Wilhelmina becomes infatuated herself but this time with Connor who has drawn suspicion from Claire.
49	8	"Tornado Girl"	John Terlesky	Peter Elkoff	November 13, 2008	9.20
With the Meade editors away on a company retreat far away from the city, Betty is left with final approval on the latest MODE issue which has the cover of a tornado but when a real tornado occurs, Betty must get to Daniel before a PR disaster happens. During the trip to the retreat with Cliff's car, Amanda and Betty discover a receipt for two wedding rings in preparations for Marc's wedding but when Marc tries to take them away, their car veers out of the road. Hilda gains an ally in her permit battle and Marc comes clean with Cliff about his "affair".
50	9	"When Betty Met YETI"	Victor Nelli, Jr.	Brian Tanen	November 20, 2008	8.30
Former Mode employee Nick Pepper has come to Mode one last time to boast about his achievement of being a high-paid newspaper employee, thanks to YETI which causes Betty to think about her future. Although Betty is facing a rivalry with Marc to get into YETI, Justin's friendship with Randy is endangered due to peer pressure.
51	10	"Bad Amanda"	John Putch	Chris Black	December 4, 2008	8.47
Amanda and Betty are forced to work together for an article called "How I Blew Ten Grand Without Spending a Dime". However, they end up being robbed of their apartment rent, causing Amanda and Betty to fight about it. Wilhelmina continues to have a crush on Connor, and tries to avoid him at first but finally admits that she wants to spend the rest of her life with Connor. Daniel tries his best to avoid any feelings towards Molly after Claire advises him that he will be heartbroken as Connor is still Molly's fiance but when he almost kisses her, Wilhelmina grabs the tape.
52	11	"Dress for Success"	Matt Shakman	Cara DiPaolo	January 8, 2009	7.51
Mode's rival Elle has stolen a dress that is scheduled to appear on an exclusive Mode cover and Betty's responsible for it all, resulting in Betty scheming with Marc to get the dress back. Wilhelmina talks to Daniel about his almost kiss-with-Molly and helps Daniel to get Molly so that she can have Connor for herself. Hilda finally opens her salon but is greatly disappointed as Betty had to work while she promised that she'd helped her with the opening. But what made the family shocked is Ignacio suffering from a heart attack.
53	12	"Sisters on the Verge of a Nervous Breakdown"	Lee Shallat-Chemel	Henry Alonso Myers	January 22, 2009	7.54
Betty and Hilda are juggling work and their father, causing Betty to misplace Daniel and Molly's photos. Meanwhile, Connor, Wilhelmina, Daniel and Molly are trying hard to cover up their relationships, but a newspaper photo may reveal all.
54	13	"Kissed Off"	Rose Troche	David Grubstick	February 5, 2009	7.27
Connor finds out about Daniel and Molly. Betty goes on a date with Jesse to find that he only cares for himself.
55	14	"The Courtship of Betty's Father"	John Terlesky	Peter Elkoff	February 12, 2009	7.44
It's Claire's 60th birthday but thinks that no one remembered it, resulting in her shoplifting. Betty tries to make a compilation memorial video for Claire but turns up with nothing but negative comments while Daniel continues seeing Molly, leaving Claire more alone. Meanwhile, Betty and Hilda are surprised that Ignacio and Elena have fallen in love and Wilhelmina tries to get rid of a parrot who mimics her saying "I love Connor!" as she is scared that Connor might not feel the same way.
56	15	"There's No Place Like Mode"	Bethany Rooney	Sheila Lawrence	February 19, 2009	7.65
Betty is assigned to interview a somewhat deranged German-accented Heinrich who has been severely traumatised by the events of the Iron Curtain, along with her new YETI partner Matt Hartley but Matt actually has more interests into Betty than into fashion. Christina also goes into labour during Fashion Week 2009 and Wilhelmina tries to win back the press after receiving several negative myths against her.
57	16	"Things Fall Apart"	Tom Verica	Henry Alonso Myers	February 26, 2009	6.78
Mode goes bankrupt as someone has hacked into its bank accounts, causing all of its employees to face a possible firing frenzy led by Wilhelmina and Daniel. Wilhelmina is pressured into choosing between living with Connor and continuing her fashion career while Betty eventually finds out who the person responsible for Mode's bankruptcy!
58	17	"Sugar Daddy"	David Warren	Brian Tanen	March 5, 2009	6.35
The recent events of the company's bankruptcy, thanks to Connor, has sent shockwaves across Mode's offices, forcing Daniel and Wilhelmina to visit a court committee for financial help, but when evidence of them having a fancy and expensive dinner in a restaurant get out, things get ugly. Aside from Mode, the Suarez family are also facing financial struggles as they are threatened with eviction. So they decide to buy their home and they all try various methods to raise the initial deposit. Despite their best efforts they are still $10,000 short, Then Hilda mysteriously receives a check for $10,000, and Betty tries to find out who it is from.
59	18	"A Mother of a Problem"	Matthew Diamond	Bill Wrubel	March 12, 2009	7.21
Betty and Matt's relationship move a level up as Betty meets Matt's mother, Victoria Hartley who dislikes her at first sight while Willie and Daniel struggle with Mode's latest financial difficulties. Asking for advice from Claire, Betty finally goes to Victoria's fancy party but Matt's mother believes that Matt should deserve a better woman.
60	19	"The Sex Issue"	Victor Nelli, Jr.	Cara DiPaolo	March 19, 2009	7.82
Betty tries to let Matt know that she wants to have more than just dates but an embarrassed Matt escapes from her clutches. Devastated, Betty receives a "sexification" tutorial from Amanda and Marc and at the end of the night she becomes a diva – temporarily. Willie is depressed about Connor's sudden getaway, causing her to not sleep normally, and Daniel is worried that Molly will embarrass him at a poetry slam with her poem about them having sex.
61	20	"Rabbit Test"	Richard Heus	Chris Black	April 30, 2009	6.81
Mode’s furniture is repossessed so Wilhelmina and Daniel decide to take drastic action. They initiate a firing frenzy and shut down 5 magazines. Meanwhile, Christina is stunned when she learns that the Meade-Slater baby may be her biological son and not Wilhelmina's! When Betty finds out that Matt's father, Cal Hartley (guest star: David Rasche) is a billionaire who finances struggling companies, she suggests to Daniel that Cal could be their "White Knight" but the trouble starts when Matt forbids the two to meet Cal.
62	21	"The Born Identity"	John Terlesky	Steven Ross	May 7, 2009	7.49
Just as it looks like Cal Hartley is going to give Mode the bailout it needs so the magazine won't go bankrupt, baby William is kidnapped – and Betty is dragged into the ensuing drama. Police forces flood into the hallways of Mode as Wilhelmina continues to suspect Christina for the kidnapping. Meanwhile, Archie asks Hilda to be part of his latest political campaign.
63	22	"In the Stars"	Paul Holahan	Sheila Lawrence	May 14, 2009	6.83
At YETI, Betty, Marc and Matt are assigned to do a magazine feature on both music and physics. They set up a photoshoot at the Planetarium and get British singer Adele to model in their shoot, however enroll in a string of difficulties when Matt proves unfocused. Meanwhile, Daniel proposes to his girlfriend and they marry the same day, at the planetarium.
64	23	"Curveball"	Victor Nelli, Jr.	Tracy Poust & Jon Kinnally	May 21, 2009	6.16
Claire receives the cold shoulder from her long-time enemy Victoria Hartley and Willie schemes to find out why, resulting in a shocking child-related discovery! Betty is shocked that her ex-boyfriend Henry has come to New York, causing a conflict for Betty's affections between Matt and Henry. Marc and Betty also are waiting that their YETI interviews have gotten them new jobs and Daniel welcomes Molly back home after her discharge from the hospital.
65	24	"The Fall Issue"	Tom Verica	Silvio Horta	May 21, 2009	6.37
The sudden death of a Mode editor leaves Betty and Marc competing for the same job. Meanwhile, Wilhelmina demands that Claire tender her resignation at a big awards ceremony ... or she'll reveal Claire's dark secret to Cal Hartley. Matt lets his jealousy over Henry get the best of him and Justin nervously waits to see if he got into performing arts school. As the season concludes, Daniel's wife passes away from cancer.

Notes:

- ABC placed Ugly Betty on a temporary hiatus after the March 19, 2009 episode to air Samantha Who? and In the Motherhood in the 8-9PM E/P slot, but returned it after the shows complete their runs. Ugly Betty returned on April 30, 2009 to finish its 3rd season, ending with a 2-hour season finale airing on May 21, 2009.

== Webisodes ==
For the third season, a spin-off online series called Mode After Hours accompanied the main series. The program followed Marc St. James (Michael Urie) and Amanda Tanen (Becki Newton) having fun around the Mode offices when they were not working. Thirteen 5-minute episodes were produced.

- September 23, "Guadalaharahh" – Amanda and Marc make fun of Betty and Daniel respectively
- September 25, "Friend-iversary VLOG" – It is the "friend-iversary" of when Marc first met Amanda, but Amanda completely forgot about it
- October 9, "Bowling for Cliff" – Amanda teaches Marc how to bowl before his bowling date with Cliff
- October 16, "Slumber Party Secrets" – Amanda and Marc sleep at Mode, and share some of their secrets.
- October 23, "Sommers Seance" – Marc and Amanda organize a seance trying to contact her dead mother Fey
- October 30, "Trapped in the Elevator" – Amanda and Marc get locked in the Mode elevator and share their darkest secrets.
- October 30, Behind the Scenes Extras and Making of Mode After Hours
- March 19, "Big Package" – Marc and Amanda have their own Christmas with unopened and undelivered office package.
- March 23, "April Fools" – Marc and Amanda think of clever ways to trick Betty on April Fools.
- March 30, "Roller Girlz" – Marc teaches Amanda how to skate in order to lose weight.
- April 8, "Breaking the Band" – Marc and Amanda compete to sing at a local karaoke bar.
- April 16, "London Calling" – Marc and Amanda call the Mode UK office for a YETI assignment and end up finding their British counterparts.
- April 23, "When Marc Met Mandy" – Marc and Amanda flash back to the first time they ever met.
- April 27, "I Spy" – Marc cancels dinner plans with Amanda to spy on his crush, Jake.

== DVD release ==
On March 13, 2009, Walt Disney Studios Home Entertainment announced that the release date of Ugly Betty Season Three, subtitled "Start Spreading the News", would be September 22, 2009 in the United States and Canada. All 24 episodes were included in the set, along with additional "Betty Bloopers", alternative takes, deleted scenes and a featurette, "Coming Home to New York City", detailing the show's return to the Big Apple after having filmed the pilot there.

DVD name	Ep #	Release dates			Additional Features
DVD name	Ep #	Region 1	Region 2	Region 4	Additional Features
The Complete Third Season – Start Spreading the News	24	September 22, 2009	December 7, 2009	November 10, 2010	This six disc box set contains all 24 episodes from the third season.

Among the features:

- Audio Commentary
- Look Who Keeps Popping Up
- Coming Home to New York City
- Mode After Hours – Webisodes
  - "Gwadalaharahh"
  - "The Friend-iversary VLOG"
  - "Bowling for Cliff"
  - "Slumber Party Secrets"
  - "Sommers Seance"
  - "Trapped in the Elevator"
  - "I Spy"
  - "Prank Calls"
- Deleted Scenes
- Betty Bloops

== US ratings ==
Episode #	Title	Air Date	Rating	Share	18–49	Viewers	Rank
42	"The Manhattan Project"	September 25, 2008	6.6	11	3.3	9.77	#26
43	"Filing for the Enemy"	October 2, 2008	5.7	9	2.6	8.58	#35
44	"Crimes of Fashion"	October 9, 2008	5.8	9	2.6	8.48	#35
45	"Betty Suarez Land"	October 16, 2008	5.6	9	2.6	8.21	#35
46	"Granny Pants"	October 23, 2008	5.7	9	2.8	8.66	#39
47	"Ugly Berry"	October 30, 2008	5.6	9	2.6	8.55	#45
48	"Crush'd"	November 6, 2008	5.8	9	2.7	8.95	#31
49	"Tornado Girl"	November 13, 2008	6.3	10	2.8	9.20	#41
50	"When Betty Met YETI"	November 20, 2008	5.4	9	2.6	8.30	#37
51	"Bad Amanda"	December 4, 2008	5.8	9	2.6	8.47	#38
52	"Dress for Success"	January 8, 2009	5.0	8	2.4	7.51	#43
53	"Sisters on the Verge of a Nervous Breakdown"	January 22, 2009	5.1	8	2.4	7.54	#42
54	"Kissed Off"	February 5, 2009	5.0	8	2.4	7.27	#44
55	"The Courtship of Betty's Father"	February 12, 2009	4.9	8	2.3	7.44	#40
56	"There's No Place Like Mode"	February 19, 2009	5.1	8	2.3	7.65	#35
57	"Things Fall Apart"	February 26, 2009	4.6	7	1.9	6.78	#41
58	"Sugar Daddy"	March 5, 2009	4.3	7	1.8	6.35	#50
59	"A Mother of a Problem"	March 12, 2009	4.9	8	2.1	7.21	#46
60	"The Sex Issue"	March 19, 2009	5.2	9	2.2	7.82	#41
61	"Rabbit Test"	April 30, 2009	4.7	9	2.0	6.81	TBA
62	"The Born Identity"	May 7, 2009	4.9	9	2.1	7.49	TBA
63	"In the Stars"	May 14, 2009	4.7	8	2.0	6.83	TBA
64	"Curveball"	May 21, 2009	4.1	7	1.8	6.16	TBA
65	"The Fall Issue"	May 21, 2009	4.2	7	2.0	6.37	TBA

== UK ratings ==
Episode number	Title	Original airing on Channel 4	Time of airing on Channel 4	Original airing on E4	Time of airing on E4	Total viewers and Rank^{a} on C4	Total viewers and rank^{a} on E4	Total viewers
42	The Manhattan Project	Wednesday, June 24, 2009	10.00 pm	-	-	2.36 million – No. 1	-	2.36 million
43	Filing for the Enemy	Wednesday, July 1, 2009	10.00 pm	Tuesday, June 30, 2009	9.00 pm	1.82 million – #8	482,000 – #3	2.302 million
44	Crimes of Fashion	Wednesday, July 8, 2009	10.00 pm	Tuesday, July 7, 2009	9.00 pm	1.73 million – #19	250,000 – #11	1.98 million
45	Betty Suarez Land	Wednesday, July 15, 2009	10.00 pm	Tuesday, July 14, 2009	9.00 pm	1.18 million – #31	506,000 – #4	1.68 million
46	Granny Pants	Wednesday, July 22, 2009	10.00 pm	Tuesday, July 21, 2009	9.00 pm	1.64 million – #24	570,000*	2.21 million
47	Ugly Berry	Wednesday, July 29, 2009	10.00 pm	Tuesday July 28, 2009	9.00 pm	1.67 million – #22	523,000 – #4	2.19 million
48	Crush'd	Wednesday, August 5, 2009	10.00 pm	Tuesday August 4, 2009	9.00 pm	1.69 million – #21	486,000 – #7	2.18 million
49	Tornado Girl	Wednesday, August 12, 2009	10.00 pm	Tuesday August 11, 2009	9.00 pm	1.56 million – #24	593,000 – #1	2.15 million
50	When Betty Met YETI	Wednesday, August 19, 2009	10.00 pm	Tuesday August 18, 2009	9.00 pm	1.46 million – #27	539,000 – #2	2.0 million
51	Bad Amanda	Wednesday, August 26, 2009	10.00 pm	Tuesday August 25, 2009	9.00 pm	1.57 million – #29	560,000 – #2	2.13 million
52	Dress for Success	Wednesday, September 2, 2009	10.00 pm	Tuesday September 1, 2009	9.00 pm	1.08 million – #31	598,000 – #4	1.68 million
53	Sisters on the Verge of a Nervous Breakdown	Wednesday, September 16, 2009	10.00 pm	Tuesday September 8, 2009	9.00 pm	1.09 million – No. 31	646,000 – #1	1.74 million
54	Kissed Off	Wednesday, September 23, 2009	10.00 pm	Tuesday, September 15, 2009	9.00 pm	1.20 million – No. 31	682,000 – #1	1.88 million
55	The Courtship of Betty's Father	Wednesday, September 30, 2009	10.00 pm	Tuesday September 22, 2009	9.00 pm	1.11 million – #31	598,000 – #1	1.71 million
56	There's No Place Like Mode	Monday, October 12, 2009	10.00 pm	Tuesday October 6, 2009	9.00 pm	0.95 million – #31	426,000 – #8	1.51 million
57	Things Fall Apart	Monday, October 19, 2009	10.00 pm	Tuesday October 13, 2009	9.00 pm	0.93 million – #31	547,000 – #3	1.53 million
58	Sugar Daddy	Monday, October 26, 2009	10.00 pm	Tuesday October 20, 2009	9.00 pm	0.71 million	536,000 – #3	1.24 million
59	A Mother of a Problem	Monday, November 2, 2009	10.00 pm	Tuesday October 27, 2009	9.00 pm	0.73 million	580,000 – #5	1.31 million
60	The Sex Issue	Monday, November 9, 2009	10.00 pm	Tuesday November 3, 2009	9.00 pm	0.59 million	590,000 – #9	1.18 million
61	Rabbit Test	Monday November 16, 2009	10.00 pm	Tuesday November 10, 2009	9.00 pm	0.77 million	609,000 – #3	1.38 million
62	The Born Identity	Monday November 23, 2009	10.00 pm	Tuesday November 17, 2009	9.00 pm	0.91 million	474,000 – #8	1.38 million
63	In the Stars	Monday November 30, 2009	10.00 pm	Tuesday November 24, 2009	9.00 pm	0.75 million	568,000 – #5	1.32 million
64	Curveball	Monday December 7, 2009	10.00 pm	Tuesday December 1, 2009	9.00 pm	0.65 million	528,000 – #7	1.178 million
65	The Fall Issue	Monday December 14, 2009	10.00 pm	Tuesday December 8, 2009	9.00 pm	0.80 million	626,000 – #5	1.426 million

- ^{*} Overnight ratings
- ^aRanks are for Channel 4 and E4 weekly, not for overall TV.
- Note: Season 3 of Ugly Betty episodes have now started airing on Wednesday nights on Channel 4 at 10:00 pm instead of the normal Friday night 9:00 pm airing and because of this the E4 first look airing has been moved from Wednesday nights to Tuesday nights. Ugly Betty episodes will not affect or be affected by Big Brother shows/evictions.
- Note: As of Monday 12, October 2009 Channel 4's airing of Ugly Betty will now be shown on Monday evenings at the normal time of 10:00 pm instead of Wednesday evenings.
