= Curveball (Ugly Betty) =

- Ugly Betty episode
- Episode no.: Season 3 Episode 23
- Directed by: Victor Nelli, Jr.
- Written by: Tracy Poust & Jon Kinnally
- Production code: 323
- Original air date: May 21, 2009

Episode chronology
← Previous "In the Stars"	Next → "The Fall Issue"
- Ugly Betty season 3

"Curveball" is the 23rd episode in the third season, the 64th episode overall, of the American dramedy series Ugly Betty, which aired on May 21, 2009. This episode doubles as the first part of a two-hour episode, a first in the series' history.

== Plot ==
After Daniel leaves the hospital with a conscious Molly after her collapse, he and Betty are invited by Cal to a Mets game to promote Mode's "Wedding Issue". Cal is pleased with Daniel's transformation from playboy to devoted husband, making him a media darling, and landing an interview on The View. At Citi Field, Daniel is given the first pitch to throw out, but when Molly introduces Daniel to an old friend, Daniel mistakes it as a hook-up from Molly for when she eventually dies. Hours later at the apartment, Daniel is disturbed when Molly keeps talking about who he will hook up with after her death. Daniel freaks out about what happened at the ballpark, saying that he does not want anybody else even after she is gone.

Betty is visited by Matt, who gives Betty a portrait of her that freaks out Amanda. Matt asks Betty to move in with him, and she accepts the offer. However, Betty later sees Henry back in New York City, and realizes that she still has feelings for her former fiancé, as she follows his Facebook account to track his whereabouts. As Betty and Marc wait to see if their YETI editor interviews resulted in actual jobs. Marc turns out Jodie might be sabotaging their efforts, as Marc notes that Jodie is interested in gay men, including him. After an exhausting day of interviews, Betty, Marc and Amanda run into Henry and his new girlfriend, Chloe. They all end up making plans to go to Daniel's Mets game. When Betty tells Matt about this, he tells her that he is cool with it. Seconds later she gets a phone call and runs into Daniel's office to tell him that she might get a job offer as an editor at The New York Review. Daniel then congratulates Betty on landing the job.

Later in the bleachers, Betty and Matt meet up with Henry and Chloe. Betty finds herself stuck between the two, leading to Betty's thoughts debating between the two on the "Fantasy Jumbotron", which is keeping score. After the game is over, Matt asks Betty why she was afraid to tell Henry about the two moving in together. At home, Betty becomes more conflicted when she tells Hilda that she is still not over Henry. At work the following day, Betty is still waiting for Jodie's phone call when Marc comes by to tell Betty that he has received a call, leaving Betty to encourage him. Betty then calls The New York Review and then shows up at the magazine to see Jodie at the desk, having stolen the job for herself, which devastates her. Marc on the other hand later stuns Wilhelmina with the news that he did get a job with Vogue.

As Betty returns to Mode while crying her heart out to Matt's voicemails, she sees Henry's Facebook post and meets him at City Park. As the two meet up and catch up with old times, they say their goodbyes and share a kiss, as Matt watches from afar.

Wilhelmina is upset by being forced to work with Claire, when Victoria stops by and shares an icy exchange with Claire. This gives Wilhelmina a plan. Wilhelmina warms up to Victoria to find out just what kind of connection Claire has to Victoria by playing tennis, singing songs and drinking midday. Then Wilhemina discovers that Claire and Cal had an affair and ended up with a child.

== Ratings ==
This first portion of the Ugly Betty season finale drew a 4.1/7 and 1.9 among 18-49s in the first hour and contributed to a 1.9/6 among 18-49s and 6.2 million viewers overall tuning in for the 2 hour episode, a 28% drop from last season's cliffhanger.

== Also starring ==
- Christopher Gorham as Henry
- Daniel Eric Gold as Matt Hartley
- Bernadette Peters as Jodie
- Christine Baranski as Victoria Hartley
- Sarah Lafleur as Molly
- Alec Mapa as Suzuki St. Pierre
- David Rasche as Calvin Hartley
- Dreama Walker as Chloe

== Guest starring ==
- Joy Behar as herself
- Elisabeth Hasselbeck as herself
- Billie Jean King as herself

== See also ==
- Ugly Betty
- Ugly Betty season 3
