= Looking for a Feeling You Never Knew You Needed =

Looking For A Feeling You Never Knew You Needed

Studio album by Val Emmich
- Released: September 21, 2010
- Genre: Pop rock

Val Emmich chronology
Little Daggers (2008)	Looking For A Feeling You Never Knew You Needed (2010)

Looking For A Feeling You Never Knew You Needed is an album by American singer-songwriter and actor Val Emmich. It was released digitally on September 21, 2010.

== Track listing ==
All lyrics written by Val Emmich; all music composed by Emmich, Ron Haney and Bart Shoudel, except where noted.

1. "Don't Wanna Go Home" – 3:34
2. "Sidekick" – 3:20
3. "Gone" – 4:03
4. "Next to Me" – 3:54
5. "E.S.T." (Emmich) – 4:26
6. "Change of Scenery" – 3:38
7. "Grown Up Man" – 3:50
8. "Resume" (Emmich) – 3:13
9. "Convince Me" (Emmich) – 3:26
10. "Come Clean" – 3:38
11. "Waiting for the End" – 3:51
12. "Call It Off" – 4:41
13. "Don't Wanna Go Home [Acoustic]" – 3:45
14. "Gone [Acoustic]" – 4:02
15. "E.S.T. [Acoustic]" (Emmich) – 4:15
16. "Rather Be Lonely [Studio Outtake]" (Emmich) – 3:15
