= Cut You Out =

Studio album by Hero Pattern
- Released: 2003
- Studio: Mad Moose Recording
- Genres: Rock, post-grunge, indie rock
- Length: 33:24
- Labels: Redi-Made, Mint 400
- Producer: Hero Pattern

Hero Pattern chronology
The Reception (2002)	Cut You Out (2003)

"Cut You Out", is the lone studio album from the American rock band, Hero Pattern.

== Content ==
The ten-track album was released on compact disc in 2003, with Redi-Made Records. It was recorded at Mad Moose Recordings, produced by Hero Pattern and mastered by Brad Blackwood at Euphonic Masters. The band cites influence from the rock band At the Drive-In, and singer-songwriter Elvis Costello. Cut You Out garnered attention from industry taste makers, and received significant spins on college and specialty radio.

The album release party was at Maxwell's in Hoboken, New Jersey, in September 2003. After Matt Pinfield played the track "Monster" on the FM radio station KROCK, the band decided to record a music video for it. The video was filmed at their friends home in Weehawken, New Jersey. On 15 February 2019, Cut You Out was digitally released with Mint 400 Records.

== Reception ==
Jeff Brown of CMJ compares the album to the music of Sister Hazel and Tonic, and says Cut You Out is a "mature, well-crafted rock record resplendent with a sound that swings for the fences." He notes Kundrath "belts over gigantic power pop guitar hook[s]" for the title-track "Cut You Out," and "What Do You Have To Say" and "Watch" nail the feel of post grunge and modern rock. A review by Brad Maybe in CMJ says "urgency takes a backseat to subtlety on the disc as a whole, with the band's even-kneel approach slowly sucking you in as it progressively builds" and closes by saying Cut You Out is "a good album from a band that's going to be great."

A review in Impact Press describes the album as "catchy, fine tuned, and ready for radio." It compares the album to Jimmy Eat World, Dashboard Confessional and All American Rejects and says "not only do I guarantee that you will like it, but I guarantee that in six months when these guys get put on the radio and break, you can say you heard them first." A mixed review in Punk Planet by Bart Niedzialkowski says "this is a good rock record if you don't mind repetitiveness."

== Track listing ==
No.	Title	Length
1.	"Watch"	3:16
2.	"Monster"	3:47
3.	"Heartsick"	2:43
4.	"What Do You Have to Say"	3;59
5.	"Cut You Out"	3:37
6.	"Suffering"	3:34
7.	"Hey Goodbye"	3:07
8.	"Save My Soul"	2:15
9.	"Invincible"	3:39
10.	"Not This Time"	3:19
Total length:		33:24

== Personnel ==
- Rob Fitzgerald – bass and vocals
- Jason Kundrath – vocals and guitar
- Mike Kundrath – drums
- Pierre Marceau – guitar and vocals
- Humphrey MacEthelred - keyboards
- Brad Blackwood – mastering
