= Granny Pants =

- Ugly Betty episode
- Episode no.: Season 3 Episode 5
- Directed by: Fred Savage
- Written by: Sheila Lawrence
- Production code: 305
- Original air date: October 23, 2008

Episode chronology
← Previous "Betty Suarez Land"	Next → "Ugly Berry"
- Ugly Betty season 3

"Granny Pants" is the fifth episode in the third season, the 46th episode overall, of the American dramedy series Ugly Betty, which aired on October 23, 2008. The episode was written by Sheila Lawrence and directed by Fred Savage.

== Plot ==
The story begins at Mode, where Betty finds herself in the middle of a battle between Daniel and Wilhelmina over the Valentine photo shoot, with Daniel insisting on "love is a battlefield" and Willi demanding one about "puppy love." Either way, from Betty and Claire's observation, the idea becomes a mess. Betty and Claire believe that ever since the 50-50 deal was made Daniel has taken his mind off DJ and focused more on work. This concerns the two as Claire confronts Daniel, who admits that he does miss DJ and he wants to settle down and start a family. Later he tells Betty about his plan, so he has compiled an application to submit to a dating service and when Betty sees it, she makes some modifications before he can submit it.

As Betty returned to her desk, she sees Kimmie sitting there. Kimmie then asks for Betty's help in finding a job after she quit her job at Flushing Burger and dumped her boyfriend, saying that she wants to start anew and have the same success that Betty has. Betty initially reluctant to accept her idea, but after Daniel suggests to Betty that she hire a temporary assistant to help her and Kimmie jumps at the opportunity.

Betty then tells Christina about what Kimmie did back in high school, as evidenced in a flashback in which Betty befriends Kimmie at the cafeteria, but as she reached for a drink in the school cooler, Kimmie pulls Betty's skirt down, exposing her unfortunately sized underwear and leading to Betty being called "Granny Pants" for the rest of high school. Christina suggests that Betty turns the tables on Kimmie, as she tells Kimmie to request a receipt and Kimmie accidentally offended Wilhelmina in the process, causing Marc to humiliate her. That move later spurred on by Hilda at Casa Suarez, even though Ignacio thinks Betty should reconsider. But on Kimmie's first day, Betty sees how Kimmie is treated by Marc and Amanda and she comes to her defense. This leads Betty to do a job briefing on Kimmie and over time the transformation is a success.

Over at the Suarez home, Justin is looking forward to making to the lead role in Billy Elliot the Musical, with encouragement from Hilda (who has been taking anger management classes to get over Tony) and Ignacio. However at school, Justin is harassed by bullies, but seems undeterred by them. Later that day at the auditions, Justin is shocked to learn that one of the bullies, a football jock named Randy, has also signed up for the auditions, leading to a dance-off between the two. But in the end both guys lost to a younger boy, and Randy broke down in tears and shoos Justin off while he is trying to cheer him up. However, the two later bond as friends at school.

However, on the night that Kimmie managed to get VIPs to several nightclubs and after she asked Betty to come along as a sign of her gratitude and start of friendship, Amanda befriends Kimmie and suggests a make over. When Betty returns to meet up with her, she is shocked to see Kimmie dressed way better than Betty. Kimmie also tells Betty that she accidentally revealed that they will go clubbing later, and she invited Amanda and Marc to tag along. During the cab ride Betty finds herself riding in the front while the trio are palling around in the backseat, and when they arrive to the club, its Betty who gets left out as Kimmie, Amanda and Marc get in. 45 minutes later, Betty prepares to leave. Kimmie stops her and tells her she only got Amanda and Marc in so that they can bond better. She then convinces Betty to go to three more clubs and an after party, because they really are friends. Betty initially refuses because of their work tomorrow, but upon learning that Daniel and Willi will not be at Mode until noon, she eventually agreed.

Also that same night, Daniel shows up to meet his date on a yacht for a dinner cruise. Unfortunately, the "date" is none other than Wilhelmina. Both are shocked that they used the same matchmaking service and lied about their profiles, but before they can exit the yacht, the yacht has already left the dock. During the evening the two have a civil dinner together but they want to finish their evening early. The two looked at the smoke alarm, and Daniel decided to activate it using a candle, while Wilhelmina assists by spraying perfume so that the flames get closer to the alarm, and the ploy works as the cruise ship had to head back to shore. Later on, the two have a casual conversation about working together even if they can't stand each other, and they decided that they should just have to trust each other as a team. When the two reached their final destination, they went their separate ways, but Wilhelmina had another reason to end their evening, which was to stop by an old acquaintance's apartment for sex.

The following morning, Betty wakes up and discovers that she is going to be late as Daniel calls her to tell her that Kimmie has picked up the slack. As Betty arrived she asked Kimmie why she didn't call her and Kimmie insists she has sent text messages to Betty. Kimmie is later seen at lunch once again palling around with Amanda and Marc, and asked Betty to get water from the cooler. When Betty went to get a drink from the cooler, the memories of the past came back as Kimmie was coming towards her, but instead it backfired as Betty accused her of trying pull the same stunt but it would be Kimmie who would be embarrassed, and as she walked away, the message Kimmie left showed up on Betty's cellphone.

As Betty felt sorry for what has happened to Kimmie, she suggests to Daniel that she give her a better role in the magazine after they got into the clubs. At the meeting room, Wilhelmina announces that she will give way to Daniel's idea for the February issue and apologizes for the previous clashing of opinions. Daniel then announced that Kimmie has been promoted to associate editor. This stuns Betty in a big way and as she witnesses Kimmie reverting to her old ways, so does her flashbacks of that day back at the high school cafeteria.

== Production ==
On the same day this episode aired, it was announced that Lohan's six episode stint would be reduced to four. This move lead to rumors about Lohan's behavior on the set, especially with America Ferrera, but the producers say that her stint was temporary anyway: "Lindsay wrapped up her arc, and she's done filming. She did a great job, and we enjoyed having her. Viewers can look forward to her episodes tonight and next week."

Despite the riff, both Becki Newton and Vanessa Williams claim that there were no problems on the set. Notes Newton: "I think people love drama, and I think when you watch the show you’ll see the drama was between the characters on screen."

== Ratings ==
Thanks in part to the 2008 World Series between the Philadelphia Phillies and the Tampa Bay Rays, this episode came in third with a 5.7/9, but at the same time posted its best-since-premiere numbers at the 8PM hour (2.8/8 in 18-49, 8.7 million viewers overall).

== Reception ==
Lohan's performance was well received, despite the negative feedback from fans. Zap2it states: "Regardless of which side you believe in the Ugly Betty-Lindsay Lohan Breakup 2008, the real loser is the audience. Say what you will about LiLo as a person, but I like her as an actress and am sad her run will be cut short. She seems very natural and doesn't woodenly overact like her peers (sorry Duffster, but you have the sweetness, no rehab thing going for you)."

== Trivia ==
The person that says "previously on Ugly Betty" is Hilda.

== Also starring ==
- Lindsay Lohan as Kimmie Keegan
- Max Ehrich as Randy
- Ashley Austin Morris as Harmony

== Guest stars ==
- Shari Albert as casting associate

== See also ==
- Ugly Betty
- Ugly Betty season 3
