= The Born Identity =

- Ugly Betty episode
- Episode no.: Season 3 Episode 21
- Directed by: John Terlesky
- Written by: Steven Ross
- Production code: 321
- Original air date: May 7, 2009

Episode chronology
← Previous "Rabbit Test"	Next → "In the Stars"

"The Born Identity" is the 21st episode in the third season, the 62nd episode overall, of the American dramedy series Ugly Betty, which aired on May 7, 2009.

== Plot ==
In the wake of Wilhelmina's claim of William being her son, Christina drowns her sorrows with Betty and Stuart at a local pub. Later at the Suarez home, Hilda announces that Archie will be running for borough council president, and wants Hilda to be part of his future. Archie also informs her that a TV news crew will stop by the house and Betty agrees to provide wardrobe from MODE for Hilda to look good in front of the camera.

At MODE, as Betty continues to cover for Christina who has not come in to work for several days, everyone else has been preparing to wow investor Calvin Hartley with a stunning presentation. When Cal hears about William, Wilhelmina is delighted to show him the crib, only to find that William has been kidnapped. When Wilhelmina accuses Christina, who only arrived shortly before the presentation, of kidnapping, Betty stands up for her, saying that Christina did not leave the Closet. As a result, the presentation, despite Cal's reluctant acquiescence, is put on hold.

Being a good friend, Betty consoles Christina as she catches up with her as she is about to leave the building in Stuart's car; only to discover William in the back seat. Christina had Stuart smuggle the baby out of the building as she believes that Wilhelmina faked the DNA results and that William is actually hers and Stuart's, showing Betty a photo of herself as a baby looking like William. Unfortunately, Christina is right: back at the Meade building, after looking at the camera that caught Stuart holding the baby, Wilhelmina admits to Marc that she did fake the DNA results.

After a madcap run from the law and finding sanctuary at the Suarez household, Betty and Christina, with William in tow, try their best to convince a shocked Hilda and Ignacio that William is Christina's son. But at the same time, Archie and the news crew are filming at the house, causing Hilda to stall them and Archie. Betty then makes a phone call to Claire, who arranges for another test to be administered. But at the last minute, thanks to an eavesdropping Marc, cops arrive on the scene to arrest Betty, but she is let go. As Christina and Stuart are led off in handcuffs, Betty tries to tell Daniel about what happened and he agrees with her. Later that night, Marc sees Wilhelmina looking at William, but silently feels that he had made a mistake in helping her.

At the Suarez home, Betty apologizes to Hilda for what happened, but Archie reveals that he knew the truth all along. With his encouragement, Betty confronts Wilhelmina at her apartment and urges her to do the right thing and tell the truth. The next day Wilhelmina holds a press conference to reveal that William is indeed Christina's son.

Knowing the truth about William's true birthright, the Meades try to fire Wilhelmina since she no longer has any claim to the ownership of the company, but oddly enough at the meeting, Cal stuns the Meades by making Wilhelmina's position in the company mandatory or he will not sign. He claims her sharky-ness is important and will balance out the Meades' nice image, leaving Daniel with no other choice but to sign off on the deal leaving Wilhelmina's stake in the company intact. Nevertheless, Wilhelmina then talks to Betty and thanks her anyway, then allows her to take William back to Christina.

With that issue now resolved, Betty hands over William to the McKinneys. As they are reunited, Christina tells Betty that she and Stuart have decided to move back to Scotland with their son, and that they plan to start a fashion business there. Although upset at losing her longtime ally, Betty wishes her the best of luck as they leave the building.

== Music ==
The ending song of this episode is "Layers", sung by Asobi Seksu.

== Production ==
This episode marked Ashley Jensen's final episode as a regular, although she appeared as a guest star in a later episode in Season 4. become a recurring regular during the fourth season. Her decision to leave the show was due to her desire to stay in Los Angeles rather than relocating to New York, which explains her absence from a handful of episodes during the third season.

== Ratings ==
This episode posted another increase, with a 2.1/7 among 18-49s, a 4.9/9 overall, and 7.5 million viewers tuning in, up 10% from the previous episode.

== Also starring ==
- David Rasche as Calvin Hartley
- Derek Riddell as Stuart McKinney
- Ralph Macchio as Archie Rodriguez
- Alec Mapa as Suzuki St. Pierre.

== See also ==
- Ugly Betty
- Ugly Betty season 3
