= Hero Pattern =

American rock band

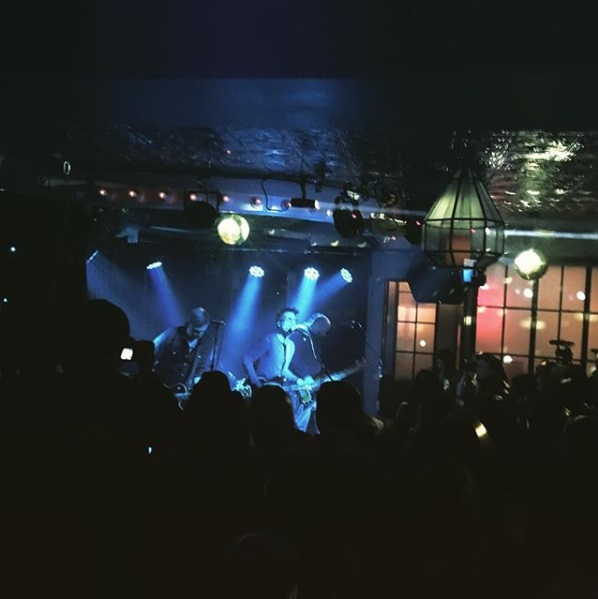
- Hero Pattern at Coney Island Baby, February 2019

Background information
- Origin: Sparta, New Jersey, U.S.
- Genres: Rock, indie rock
- Years active: 2001–2009, 2019
- Labels: Lonesome Recordings, Redi-Made, Fabtone, Mint 400
- Past members: Rob Fitzgerald; Jason Kundrath; Mike Kundrath; Pierre Marceau

Hero Pattern was an American rock band from New Jersey. They played post-grunge and modern rock that drew inspiration from the music of Elvis Costello and Tom Petty. Music journalist Jim Testa called Hero Pattern an "energetic brand of indie rock."

== History ==
Lead vocalist Jason Kundrath and bassist Rob Fitzgerald played in a band, before being joined by drummer Mike Kundrath. When guitarist Pierre Marceau's band broke up, he joined the group and together they formed Hero Pattern in 2001. Jason Kundrath acknowledges inspiration from classic rock and grunge, and mentions in an interview with The Signal that "The Beatles were my first obsession."

They released a split EP with Val Emmich, entitled The Reception in 2002. Hero Pattern became regulars in the New Jersey music scene, and played alongside Pilot to Gunner, Ted Leo and the Pharmacists, the Dismemberment Plan and Superdrag in the early 2000s.

=== Cut You Out ===
Hero Pattern released their debut full-length album, Cut You Out, on Redi-Made Records in 2003. It is described as having "robust melodies, heavy choruses, and big domineering guitars," and compared to Sister Hazel and Tonic. A positive review in Impact Press calls Cut You Out "catchy and fine tuned," and compares them to popular contemporaries Jimmy Eat World and All American Rejects. The reviewer contends that if you like their music, "I guarantee that you will like [Cut You Out]," and that "in six months when these guys get put on the radio and break, you can say you heard them first." The review closes with "if you skip the $5 shit bar tour these guys are on right now, then the next time you will be spending $15 to see them at some place like House of Blues[,] and the next time after that who knows, you may just be watching them talk to whatever tool MTV has employed to brainwash the kiddies now." They recorded a music video in Weehawken, New Jersey, for the song "Monster." In support of the album, Hero Pattern toured across the United States, and performed at the Midwest Music Summit, the NEMO Music Conference and the CMJ Music Marathon.

In early 2007, Hero Pattern released the six-song EP The Deception on Fabtone Records. Independent Clauses notes "whether it be their raging rock riffs, catchy pop vocals, or indie song arrangements, the quartet has developed the perfect formula to blend all three into six noteworthy tunes." They went on a twenty-four show tour in support of the EP with Jet Lag Gemini, National Fire Theory and River City High, over a twenty-seven day period. Their music is featured in the television show Jersey Shore. In 2009, Hero Pattern began to record a new album "when we made the decision to call it quits." In 2010 they played a reunion show at Maxwell's.

Rob Fitzgerald and Mike Kundrath have been working in music video promotion. A previously unreleased song called "Misleader" appears on the 2011 Mint 400 Records compilation, Our First Compilation. On February 15, 2019, Mint 400 Records digitally reissued Cut You Out, and Hero Pattern played a reunion show at Coney Island Baby in New York City, on February 23, 2019.

== Members ==
- Rob Fitzgerald – bass and vocals
- Jason Kundrath – vocals and guitar
- Mike Kundrath – drums
- Pierre Marceau – guitar and vocals

== Discography ==
Albums

- Cut You Out (2003)

EPs

- The Reception (2002) with Val Emmich
- The Deception (2007)

Appearing on

- Our First Compilation (2011)
