= Toks Olagundoye =

Nigerian actress (born 1975)

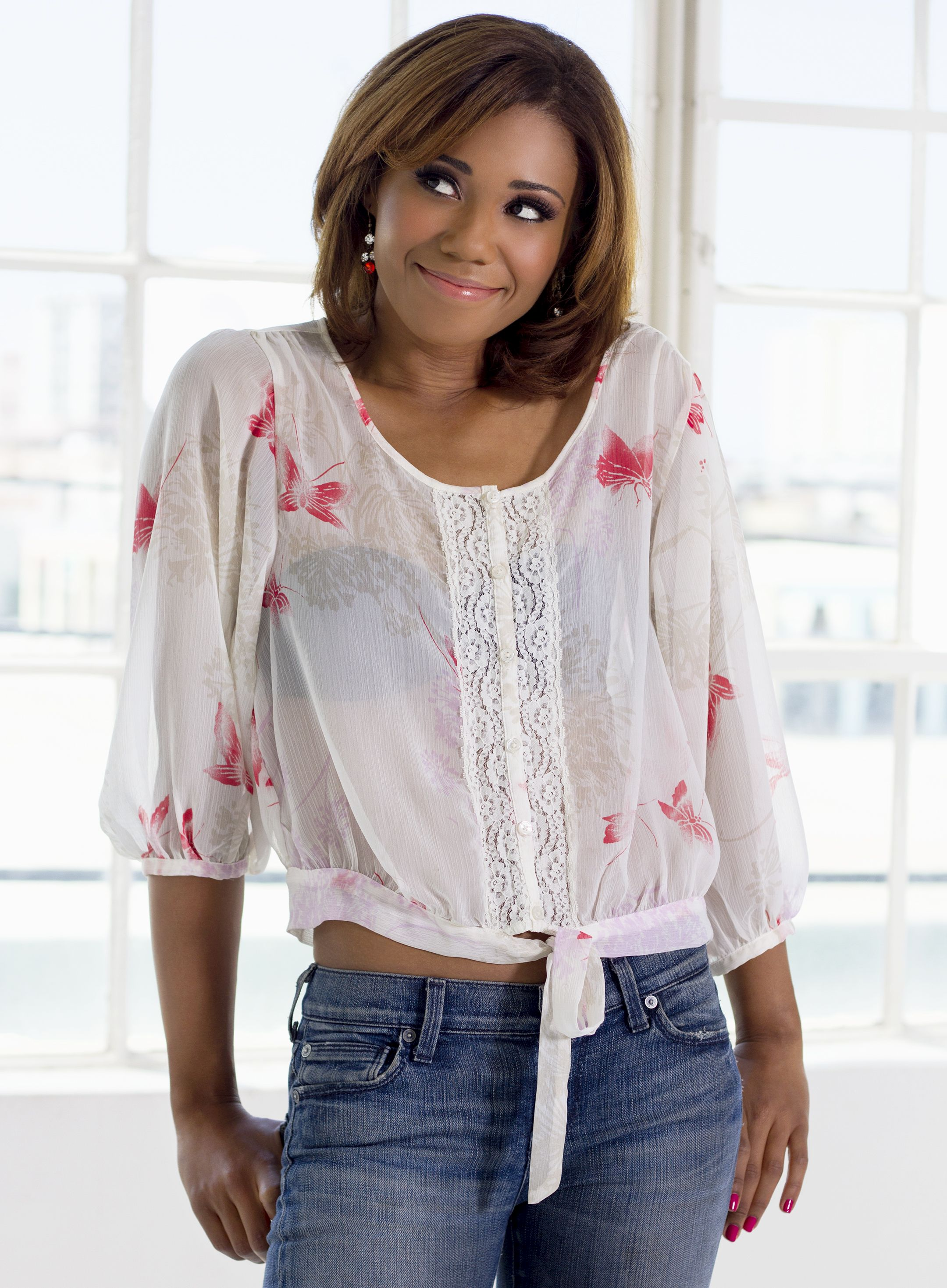
- Olagundoye in 2013
- Born: Olatokunbo Susan Olasubomi Abeke Olagundoye; 16 September 1975 (age 51); Lagos, Nigeria
- Education: Smith College (BFA)
- Occupation: Actress
- Years active: since 2000
- Spouse: Sean Quinn (m. 2015)
- Children: 1

Olatokunbo Susan Olasobunmi Abeke "Toks" Olagundoye (Yoruba pronunciation; born 16 September 1975) is a Nigerian actress known for playing Jackie Joyner-Kersee on The Neighbors, Hayley Shipton on Castle, professor Fiona Ryan on The Rookie, and Olivia Finch on Frasier. She also voices Nanefua Pizza on Steven Universe, Mrs. Beakley on DuckTales, Countess Cleo on Carmen Sandiego, Zamfir on Castlevania and Mel Medarda on Arcane.

== Early life and education ==
Olagundoye was born in Lagos, Nigeria, to a Nigerian father and a Norwegian mother. As a youth, she was educated in Nigeria, Switzerland, and England. She earned a Bachelor of Fine Arts in theatre from Smith College.

== Career ==
Olagundoye made her screen debuts on both TV and the big screen in 2002; in an episode of the television series The Education of Max Bickford; and in the film Brown Sugar later that same year. She appeared opposite Ruby Dee in an off-Broadway production Saint Lucy's Eyes in April 2001, and in 2005, she cofounded the theater company Three Chicks Theatre, which produced Andrea Lepcio's One Nation Under in 2008. Olagundoye has guest-starred on Ugly Betty, Law & Order, CSI: NY, Switched at Birth, NCIS and Prime Suspect. Her film credits include A Beautiful Soul, Come Back to Me, Absolute Trust and The Salon.

In 2012, Olagundoye was cast as a series regular in the ABC comedy series The Neighbors, playing the part of Jackie Joyner-Kersee until the series was canceled after two seasons in 2014. She later had starring roles in the two television pilots: Feed Me, opposite Mary-Louise Parker for NBC; and Amazon's Salem Rogers, co-starring with Leslie Bibb. In 2015, Olagundoye joined the main cast for the final season of the ABC comedy-drama Castle, in the role of British former MI6 operative Hayley Shipton, who joins Castle's P.I. firm.

From 2017 to 2021, she voiced Bentina Beakley for the 2017 reboot of DuckTales. In 2019, Olagundoye had a recurring role on the final season of Veep playing Senator Kemi Talbot. Olagundoye does the voice acting for Mel Medarda in Arcane: League of Legends (2021). In 2021, she had a recurring role on the ABC series The Rookie, and in 2022, was cast as one of the leads in the ABC revival of L.A. Law.

== Personal life ==
On May 16, 2015, Olagundoye married Sean Quinn, whom she met on Twitter, after several years of dating. Before and during the filming of the first season of the sequel Frasier, which premiered in 2023, Olagundoye underwent three lumpectomies, chemotherapy, and a double mastectomy to recover from triple-negative breast cancer.

== Filmography ==
=== Film ===
Year	Title	Role	Notes
2002	Brown Sugar	Sidney's LA Assistant	
2005	The Salon	Peaches	
2009	Absolute Trust	Kelly	
2010	Mom Squad	Mom	Short film
2010	Dorito-hibition!	Danielle	Short film
2011	Most Wanted	Operative Keel	
2011	Come Back to Me	Seritou	
2011	Life Begins at Rewirement	Nurse	Short film
2012	A Beautiful Soul	Theresa Whitaker	
2012	Democracy at Work	Meghan Oliver	
2018	The Death of Superman	Cat Grant (voice)	Direct-to-video
2018	Dog Days	Nina	
2018	Tremors	Jessica Florence	Television film
2019	Reign of the Supermen	Cat Grant (voice)	Direct-to-video
2019	Steven Universe: The Movie	Nanefua Pizza (voice)	Television film
2022	Rise of the Teenage Mutant Ninja Turtles: The Movie	Krang Two, Window Woman (voice)	Television film
2022	Beavis and Butt-Head Do the Universe	Fantasy Women, Campaign Worker, Female Students (voice)	
2026	Batman: Knightfall	Shondra Kinsolving (voice)	Direct-to-video

=== Television ===
Year	Title	Role	Notes
2002	The Education of Max Bickford	Hannah	Episode: "An Open Book"
2004	Law & Order	Janette Gardner	Episode: "C.O.D."
2006	3 lbs	Mary	Episode: "Of Two Minds"
2008	Ugly Betty	Sales Girl	Episode: "Bad Amanda"
2010	Law & Order	Claire	Episode: "Blackmail"
2010	CSI: NY	Reporter	Episode: "Hide Sight"
2011	Switched at Birth	Cooking Class Teacher	Episode: "The Persistence of Memory"
2011	NCIS	Rebeka Hooper	Episode: "Safe Harbor"
2011	Prime Suspect	Lucy Martin	Episode: "Wednesday's Child"
2012–2014	The Neighbors	Jackie Joyner-Kersee	44 episodes
2014–2019	Steven Universe	Nanefua, Cluster (voice)	5 episodes
2015	The Fosters	Faith	Episodes: "More Than Words", "Lucky"
2015–2016	Castle	Hayley Shipton	13 episodes
2016	Vixen	Mari's Mother, News Reporter (voices)	2 episodes
2017–2021	DuckTales	Mrs. Beakley, Server (voices)	Main role
2017	Guardians of the Galaxy	Ja Kyee Lrurt (voice)	Episode: "Mr. Roboto"
2017	The Gifted	Carla Jackson	Episode: "eXposed"
2018	Modern Family	Lucy	Episode: "CHiPs and Salsa"
2018	Dirty John	Paula Harding, ESQ.	Episode: "Remember It Was Me"
2019	Carmen Sandiego	Countess Cleo, various voices	Recurring voice role
2019	Veep	Kemi Talbot	5 episodes
2019	Crazy Ex-Girlfriend	Julia	2 episodes
2020	Cleopatra in Space	Commodore Winifred	Episode: "Parasites"
2020	Shameless	Chicago P.D. Sgt. Leesie Janes	Season 11, Episodes: "Frances Francis Franny Frank" and "NIMBY", "Slaughter"
2020, 2022	Star Trek: Lower Decks	Captain Amina Ramsey	2 episodes
2021	The Rookie	Professor Fiona Ryan	6 episodes
2021	Castlevania	Zamfir (voice)	5 episodes
2021	Big Shot	Terri Grint	5 episodes
2021	Adventure Time: Distant Lands	Dr. Caledonius (voice)	Episode: "Wizard City"
2021	Kid Cosmic	Madame President (voice)	
2021	Arcane	Mel Medarda (voice)	
2022	We Baby Bears	Lady Lima (voice)	2 episodes
2022	Cars on the Road	Margaret Motorray, Chiefess, Additional voices	
2022	Family Guy	Auctioneer (voice)	Episode: "The Stewaway"
2022	Tales of the Jedi	Ganitka (voice)	Episode: "Life and Death"
2022-2026	Beavis and Butt-Head	Marcie Anderson, Shawna/Donna, various (voice)	18 episodes
2023	The Legend of Vox Machina	Devana Vessar (voice)	Episode: "Echo Tree"
2023	Fatal Attraction	Conchita Lewis	Main role (5 episodes)
2023–2024	Frasier	Olivia Finch	Main role (20 episodes)
2025	Tomb Raider: The Legend of Lara Croft	Taiwo, Penelope Stone (voices)	2 episodes

=== Video games ===
Year	Title	Voice role	Notes
2014	Game of Thrones	Beskha	
2017	Middle-earth: Shadow of War	Carnán	
2018	Artifact	Vanessa	
2022	Saints Row	Commanding Officer Gwen	
2025	League of Legends	Mel Medarda	
2026	Deadlock (closed beta)	Calico	

== See also ==
- List of Yoruba people
- List of Nigerian actresses
