= Dress for Success (Ugly Betty) =

- Ugly Betty episode
- Episode no.: Season 3 Episode 11
- Directed by: Matt Shakman
- Written by: Cara DiPaolo
- Production code: 311
- Original air date: January 8, 2009

Episode chronology
← Previous "Bad Amanda"	Next → "Sisters on the Verge of a Nervous Breakdown"
- Ugly Betty season 3

"Dress for Success" (also known as "Dressed for Success") is the 11th episode in the third season, the 52nd episode overall, of the American dramedy series Ugly Betty, which aired on January 8, 2009. The episode was directed by Matt Shakman.

== Plot ==
"Hilda's Beautilities" is relaunching, and Betty helps her family prepare for the relaunch, believing it will not interfere with her work and her studies at YETI. At MODE, Daniel and Wilhelmina tell the staff that they have landed Keira Knightley for an April shoot and just ordered a Halston dress for her to wear on the cover, and Betty is tasked by Daniel to pick up the dress. The two also warn that this info must not be leaked out to the competition. In addition, Betty's idol, YETI editor Jodie Papadakis (Bernadette Peters), lectures her for missing an important social networking gathering the night before in favor of helping her family. Jodie then gives the students their assignment to gather 40 contacts through social networking (no family members), and warns them that they will be kicked out if they do not complete this.

With help from Marc and Amanda at a local bar, a reluctant Betty does gets some good tips, where she succeeds in single-handedly amassing a large amount of contacts, despite passing on helping Hilda again that same evening, leaving Hilda disappointed. At the end of the night she encounters Teri O'Shaughnessy (Nikki Blonsky), an assistant at ELLE magazine, and begin talking over drinks. However, when Betty goes to the bathroom, Teri eyes her phone that was left on the table and manages to scoop enough info for ELLE. Teri not only get Knightley for ELLE, but also steals the dress for their party by using Betty's name, making Wilhelmina furious and Daniel somewhat upset at ELLE's sabotaging tactics.

Luckily, Betty recalls who Teri said is catering the ELLE party that evening, and gets the caterer to sneak her and Marc in to steal back the dress, just in time to escape Teri's clutches after she spots the two. Arriving with the adorned dress at a lavish party in Wilhelmina's apartment, Betty and Marc get invited in and have the opportunity to converse with the fashion elite. When Jodie spots Betty, surprised to see her at a party like this, Betty asks Jodie to be her mentor, and Jodie responds by allowing her to remain on YETI, impressed with her newfound social networking ability.

Unfortunately, after Betty arrives at the empty Suarez home, she learns that Hilda left several more messages on her phone. She calls Hilda, who tells her that Ignacio had a heart attack, prompting her to rush to the hospital to be there for him alongside her family.

Meanwhile, Daniel and Wilhelmina's feelings over Molly and Connor respectively continue to take center stage. Wilhelmina shows Daniel the security footage of his almost-kiss with Molly and encourages him to follow his heart, which Wilhelmina uses as a ploy so she can steal Connor for herself. While Connor looks very susceptible and admiring of Wilhelmina at the party where people mistake them for a couple, Daniel privately confesses his feelings for Molly and says he will allow her to leave if she can honestly tell him that she does not feel the same way about him. Taken aback at his revelation, Molly leaves the party with Connor before Wilhelmina can confess her feelings for him. As Wilhelmina consoles Daniel over Molly, he reveals he is aware of Wilhelmina's crush on Connor, but promises to keep it a secret. But Molly later shows up on Daniel's steps, saying she does have feelings for him and has broken up with Connor, and she and Daniel consummate their almost-kiss. Likewise, Connor then surprises Wilhelmina at her door and kisses her.

== Ratings ==
Although they came in third to the BCS Championship Game between the Florida Gators and Oklahoma Sooners on Fox and a repeat of CSI: NY, the episode scored a 5.0/8 overall, a 2.4/6 among 18-49s and 7.50 million viewers, even though it was down from 900,000 viewers from the previous episode.

== Also starring ==
- Grant Bowler as Connor Owens
- Sarah Lafleur as Molly

== Guest starring ==
- Bernadette Peters as Jodie Papadakis
- Nikki Blonsky as Teri O'Shoughnessy
- Thomas Sadoski as Ryan Richards, the Caterer
- Elaine Kussack as Mrs. Bowen

== See also ==
- Ugly Betty
- Ugly Betty season 3
