= Betty Suarez Land =

- Ugly Betty episode
- Episode no.: Season 3 Episode 4
- Directed by: Michael Spiller
- Written by: Chris Black
- Production code: 304
- Original air date: October 16, 2008

Episode chronology
← Previous "Crimes of Fashion"	Next → "Granny Pants"

"Betty Suarez Land" is the fourth episode in the third season, the 45th episode overall, of the American dramedy series Ugly Betty, which aired on October 16, 2008. The episode was written by Chris Black and directed by Michael Spiller. The episode is the last appearance of Rebecca Romijn on the series.

== Plot ==
Betty is thrilled that Gio is back from his trip from Rome but Gio's unhappy that Betty did not go with him, starting a feud. While attempting to win Gio's heart back, Betty is forced to help keep Daniel Meade Jr. away from his grandparents who have already filed a custodial claim and has come to New York to get their grandson back, devastating Daniel. Meanwhile, Alexis is charged for attempted murder because of a scheming Willie which frustrates Claire.

== Cast ==
=== Also starring ===
- Rebecca Romijn as Alexis Meade
- Freddy Rodriguez as Gio Rossi
- Eddie Cibrian as Coach Diaz
- Alec Mapa as Suzuki St. Pierre
- Julian de la Celle as Daniel Jr.

=== Guest stars ===
- Barry Bostwick as Roger Adams
- Christian Hoff as D.A. Blackman
- Jacques Pépin as Gerard Chainet
- Nikki James as Marie Chainet.

== Reception ==
=== Ratings ===
The episode continued to hold on to its second place showing with a 5.6/9, with 2.6/8 among 18-49s and 8.2 million viewers overall watching.

=== Critical response ===
The episode and Gio's return were well received. Zap2it states: "Gio's back with a vengeance on Ugly Betty as the grumpy, smart-assed and annoying guy that I first grew to know and love. Yup, that means that abrasive chemistry with Betty is back. The writers are obviously revitalized because there's just a better sense of purpose and fun this season."

== See also ==
- Ugly Betty
- Ugly Betty season 3
