= When Betty Met YETI =

- Ugly Betty episode
- Episode no.: Season 3 Episode 9
- Directed by: Victor Neili, Jr.
- Written by: Brian Tanen
- Production code: 309
- Original air date: November 20, 2008

Episode chronology
← Previous "Tornado Girl"	Next → "Bad Amanda"
- Ugly Betty season 3

"When Betty Met YETI" is the ninth episode in the third season, the 50th episode overall, of the American dramedy series Ugly Betty, which aired on November 20, 2008. The episode was directed by Victor Neili, Jr.

== Plot ==
Former Mode employee Nick Pepper has come to Mode one last time to boast about his achievement of being a high-paid newspaper employee, thanks to YETI which causes Betty to think about her future. Although Betty is facing a rivalry with Marc to get into YETI, Justin's friendship with Randy is endangered due to peer pressure.

== Comparisons ==
Around the time this episode aired, its Philippine counterpart I ♥ Betty La Fea had a storyline in which the titular character was preparing to launch a similar magazine that was also called B. This case of similarities can also be contributed to the Filipino version using some of the elements from the American version, as well as from Yo soy Betty, la fea, from which the Filipino and American versions derived their ideas.

== Reception ==
In a review from zap2it's Hahn Nguyen, "For anyone who has struggled to break out of their entry level position, does Ugly Betty have an episode for you. I kinda loved this part [Betty's attempt to get into YETI] of the episode."

The episode's take on affirmative action, especially on racial and homosexual stereotyping, didn't go unnoticed in this review from Television Without Pity.

Entertainment Weekly's Tanner Stransky notes that the scenes involving Betty and Marc were among the best in this episode.

== Ratings ==
The episode ran second in most categories at 8 o'clock with a 5.4/9 rating, a 2.5/7 in 18-49s and 8.3 million viewers overall. However it was off by 900,000 viewers (down 10 percent) from the previous episode after several weeks of rating increases.

== Also starring ==
- Grant Bowler as Connor Owens
- Sarah LaFleur as Molly
- Max Greenfield as Nick Pepper
- Max Ehrich as Randy

== Guest starring ==
- Timothy J. Cox as Magazine Editor
- Mark Badgley as himself
- James Mischka as himself

== See also ==
- Ugly Betty
- Ugly Betty season 3
