= Bad Amanda =

- Ugly Betty episode
- Episode no.: Season 3 Episode 10
- Directed by: John Putch
- Written by: Chris Black
- Production code: 310
- Original air date: December 4, 2008

Episode chronology
← Previous "When Betty Met YETI"	Next → "Dress for Success"

"Bad Amanda" is the tenth episode in the third season, the 51st episode overall, of the American dramedy series Ugly Betty, which aired on December 4, 2008. The episode was written by Chris Black and directed by John Putch.

== Plot ==
Amanda and Betty are forced to work together for an article called "How I Blew Ten Grand Without Spending a Dime". However, they end up being robbed of their apartment rent, causing Amanda and Betty to fight about it. Wilhelmina continues to have a crush on Connor, and tries to avoid him at first but finally admits that she wants to spend the rest of her life with Connor. Daniel tries his best to avoid any feelings towards Molly after Claire advises him that he will be heartbroken as Connor is still Molly's fiance but when he almost kisses her, Wilhelmina grabs the tape.

== Production ==
This episode's production number was originally listed as 311 (Season 3, episode 11), but was renumbered due to an error.

== Reception ==
In Entertainment Weekly's review, Tanner Stransky was excited to see Ashley Jensen get some screen time and called the episode "Good stuff!"

== Ratings ==
The episode scored a 5.8/9 rating overall, with a 2.6/7 in 18-49s and 8.47 million viewers (roughly up by 200,000 more viewers from the previous showing) tuning in.

== Also starring ==
- Grant Bowler as Connor Owens
- Sarah Lafleur as Molly

== Guest starring ==
- Toks Olagundoye as the salesgirl
- Aaron Lazar as Claudio
- Mercer Boffey as Luka
- Matt Wilkas as the manager
- Nicole Roderick as the temp
- Kate Miller as the restaurant owner

== See also ==
- Ugly Betty
- Ugly Betty season 3
