= The Manhattan Project (Ugly Betty) =

- Ugly Betty episode
- Episode no.: Season 3 Episode 1
- Directed by: Victor Nelli, Jr.
- Written by: Silvio Horta
- Production code: 301
- Original air date: September 25, 2008

Episode chronology
← Previous "Jump"	Next → "Filing for the Enemy"
- Ugly Betty season 3

"The Manhattan Project" (also known as "Nights in Rome or Tucson") is the first episode in the third season, the 42nd episode overall, and the third-season premiere of the American dramedy series Ugly Betty, which aired on September 25, 2008.

== Plot ==
Two months after the second-season finale, Betty returns to New York after a cross-country solo trip across the United States. It is revealed that she rejected both Gio and Henry in favor of working on herself and her career. Back at home, Betty announces her new goals: to get more responsibilities at work, to not get involve with romantic entanglements, and to get her own apartment in Manhattan.

Betty returns to Mode ready to get to work, but discovers Wilhelmina has made many changes, changing the office to be more cold and severe. Marc and Amanda welcome her back but Wilhelmina informs Betty that she will be joining Daniel at "Player", a young men's magazine. Player is a much more boorish and casual workplace, with Daniel Jr. frequently pulling pranks and the articles focused only on shallow topics. Nevertheless, Betty gets assigned to head up the magazine's Harley motorcycle event and has to take over when Daniel. Jr. sprays Silly String on a model. Betty has to take the model's place and Daniel Jr. sprays her with Silly String, causing Betty to crash in a spectacularly embarrassing fashion. Marc and Amanda take pleasure in Betty's humiliation.

Betty goes apartment-hunting with Christina and finds a perfect apartment, but someone else takes the lease. The real estate agent convinces Betty to taking another unit in the building sight unseen, which turns out to be a filthy mess. Betty's family surprises her by fixing up the apartment and she is delighted with her new space. Betty also meets her new neighbor, Jesse, who is an attractive musician.

Ignacio has a new job at Flushing Burger, where his boss is Kimmie Keegan, Betty's high school bully. When Kimmie learns Ignacio is Betty's father, she starts treating him harshly. When Betty and Hilda confront Kimmie, the three get into a food fight. Betty later apologizes to Kimmie, who surprises her by admitting she is jealous of Betty's loving family, great job and city apartment. Kimmie gives Ignacio his job back and promises to treat him fairly.

Meanwhile, Claire's new magazine Hot Flash causes a rift between Claire and Wilhelmina. Wilhelmina asks Alexis for an increased budget to promote to relaunch of Mode, but Alexis informs her that finances are already focused on promoting Hot Flash's debut cover in Times Square. Wilhelmina plots to get increase Mode's budget and invites Alexis to join her in promoting Mode on Live with Regis & Kelly. The interview takes a turn when the hosts mock Hot Flash and they read an article that trashes Alexis' appearance and discusses how she demoted Daniel.

Embarrassed, Alexis gives Hot Flash's Times Square spot to Mode. At a family dinner, Claire confronts Alexis for falling for Wilhelmina's tricks while Daniel Jr. acts up. Daniel sends him to his room and complains about Daniel Jr.'s bad behavior. Claire tells Daniel that parenting is not easy but he will need to do what is best for his son. Daniel makes up with his son and vows to enroll him in school so he can have a normal life. Claire is informed that Hot Flash will be downsized and she reminds Alexis that Wilhelmina is pushing the Meades away from each other and eventually Wilhelmina will push Alexis out too.

Nevertheless, Mode keeps the Times Square spot and Wilhelmina and Marc congratulate themselves on a job well done.

== Production ==
"The Manhattan Project" is the second episode in the series to be produced in New York City (the first being the Pilot).

The rumored working title for this episode was "Nights in Rome or Tucson". Filming began July 9, 2008.

== Casting ==
This episode marked the first for Rebecca Romijn as a recurring role, while it introduced one new recurring regular, Val Emmich as Jesse in his first episode.

== Music ==
Music featured in this episode includes "American Girl" by Tom Petty and the Heartbreakers, "Roam" by The B-52's, and "Rump Shaker" by Wreckx-n-Effect.

== Ratings ==
While it did well in the US with a 6.6/11 among all households, a 3.3 among 18-49s, and 9.78 million viewers watching, it was down 12 percent from the second season opener.

== Also starring ==
- Rebecca Romijn as Alexis Meade
- Val Emmich as Jesse
- Freddy Rodriguez as Gio Rossi
- Eddie Cibrian as Coach Tony Diaz
- Julian de la Celle as Daniel Jr.
- Christopher Gorham as Henry Grubstick
- Lindsay Lohan as Kimmie Keegan

== Guest starring ==
- Regis Philbin as himself
- Kelly Ripa as herself
- Jordan Gelber as Uno
- Kate Reinders as Ginger

== See also ==
- Ugly Betty
- Ugly Betty season 3
