= Val Emmich =

American actor and musician (born 1979)

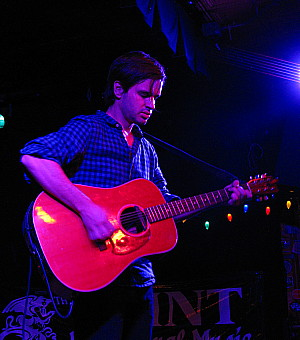
- Emmich in 2012

Background information
- Born: Val Matthew Emmich; 1979 (age 46–47); Manalapan Township, New Jersey, U.S.
- Genre: Rock
- Occupations: Writer, musician, actor, teacher
- Instruments: Guitar, piano, vocals
- Years active: 1997–present (actor); 2001–present (musician)
- Labels: Sony/Epic, Bluhammock Music, No Code

Val Matthew Emmich (/ˈɛmɪk/ EM-ik; born 1979) is an American writer, singer-songwriter, and actor. He is the author of three novels including The New York Times best-selling book in the young adult fiction category Dear Evan Hansen: The Novel and the adult novel The Reminders. He has had acting roles on HBO's Vinyl, NBC's 30 Rock, Showtime's The Big C, and ABC's Ugly Betty. As a singer-songwriter, he has released over a dozen albums over a twenty-five year career.

== Early life ==
Emmich was born in Manalapan, New Jersey. He is of Italian, Russian, and German ancestry. He attended Manalapan High School where he played soccer. At age 15, he was diagnosed with Lyme disease and had to give up all strenuous activities. During this time, he learned to play the guitar and began to write songs. In 2001, Emmich and fellow musician Andy Gesner founded Artist Amplification, a program to help independent musicians and bands gain exposure to fans and the music industry.

== Musical career ==
While attending Rutgers University, Emmich performed with various bands, including Awake Asleep and Ben Trovato. His first band's name was Superband, and he got a demo into the hands of Andy Gesner, then promoting with New Brunswick Underground. Gesner put off listening to the demo because of the band's name, but put it in on a flight, and was hooked, starting their music collaboration. Superband changed names to Ben Trovato, and released one album. Emmich then formed a new band, Awake Asleep, with Gesner on Bass, releasing one album.

After graduating from Rutgers in 2001 with a degree in American Studies, Emmich recorded an independent EP entitled The 15 Minute Relationship.

Val Emmich in concert in San Diego, California

He then recorded Slow Down Kid, a full-length independent album on Childlike Records produced by Wayne Dorrell. In November 2002, Emmich recorded his first music video, for the song "Shock", with his friend Matt Schumann, who went on to direct nearly all of Emmich's music videos. The video for "Shock" was featured at LA's Hype Fest and Toronto's NEXT Festival. Emmich recorded a video for his song, "Privacy Attracts A Crowd." The video was shot at his alma mater Rutgers University in New Brunswick, and at the night club The Saint in Asbury Park, NJ. The video appeared on MTV's Total Request Live, making him the first unsigned artist to be featured on the show. He was then signed by Epic Records label Red Ink and recorded a new version of his Slow Down Kid album with four new songs, despite having already written and recorded an entire album of new material (entitled Scent and not released until Post Haste).

In 2005, Emmich moved temporarily to Woodstock, New York and recorded another independent album, Songs, Volume 1: Woodstock which was released in 2007. The Woodstock sessions eventually became the independent studio album Sunlight Searchparty. In 2007, a track from the album, "The Only One Lonely," won the best video category at the Independent Music Awards. After recording Sunlight Searchparty, Emmich left Epic Records in 2006 due to artistic differences. In 2008, Emmich signed with Bluhammock Music. On May 27, 2008, he released his first single from Little Daggers entitled "Get On With It". The full album was released on September 23, 2008. Emmich's music video for "Get on With It" was nominated for a Best Video Award at the 2008 Independent Music Awards. He released Looking For A Feeling You Never Knew You Needed on September 21, 2010, in a digital only format. In June 2011 he announced his intention to use Kickstarter to fund his next album and in just under 24 hours he reached his goal of raising $7000; by the end of the month he had reached more than $15,000. The album was produced by Jason Cupp and was designed to capture the feel of a live performance. On August 16 the album was released digitally to Kickstarter backers and was later released to the general public on October 11. Titled Aide Memoire, the 10-track album was recorded completely live to tape. On August 28, 2012, Emmich released his album Bulldozzzer via Bandcamp free of charge. The 10-track album was kept secret from his fans until one week prior to its release.

In 2015, Emmich began a side project called The Good Names Are Taken and released a self-titled 6-song EP.

The Star-Ledger called Emmich "one of the finest songwriters in the Garden State, [and] also one of the most prolific."

=== Musical influences ===
Emmich has been influenced by a wide range of musicians including Nirvana, Smashing Pumpkins, Pearl Jam, The Beatles, Wilco, Björk, Radiohead, R.E.M., Bright Eyes, Nada Surf and Paul Westerberg.

== Acting career ==
Emmich began acting in 1997 to finance his college education. He got his start appearing in a television commercials for the Got Milk?, Burger King and AT&T Wireless. He has also appeared in small roles in the television shows Ed, Third Watch, and Hope & Faith. He appeared in NBC's 30 Rock with Tina Fey in the seventh episode of the second season titled "Cougars", ABC's Cashmere Mafia with Lucy Liu and as a love interest of Betty Suarez on Ugly Betty. In the summer of 2008, he shot his first film, playing the lead role in the independent feature Fighting Fish.

In 2014 he was hired by United Airlines for their television ad campaign "your gateway to the world", created by McGarryBowen in New York. In this commercial Emmich has to respectfully mangle various languages as he travels the world on the airline. In 2016, he appeared as the recurring character, Alex, a guitarist with sticky fingers in the HBO series Vinyl.

== Writing career ==
Emmich's debut novel, The Reminders, was published by Little Brown in the US and Canada in 2017 as well as in the U.K. (Picador), Denmark (Politikens), China (Horizon), France (Mosaic), Israel (Kinneret), Italy (Piemme), Germany (Droemer), Brazil (Intrinseca), and Holland (Ambo Anthos). It is currently being developed as a film.

The Reminders was well-reviewed and received mostly praise by critics. Popsugar called the book "Beautiful and beguiling, a story that will stay with you long after you finish reading it." The Star-Ledger said it was "A lovely debut novel exploring the bonds of friendship....enchanting....definitely worthy of being remembered." In the National Book Review, "The Reminders" was deemed "A charming debut novel....Like Nick Hornby, Emmich has a knack for avoiding the treacly and saccharine while finding magic in unlikely relationships." The novel was included in the best-of lists of Harper's BAZAAR, Entertainment Weekly, New York Post, AM New York, and HELLO! Canada. On May 28, 2017, Emmich appeared on NPR's "Weekend Edition" to discuss the book with host Lulu Garcia-Navarro.

In 2018, Emmich adapted Steven Levenson and Pasek and Paul's Broadway musical Dear Evan Hansen into a young adult novel. It was released on October 9, 2018. It debuted on the New York Times best-seller list at #2 for the week of October 28, 2018. On November 29, 2018, Universal Pictures and producer Marc Platt (father to Dear Evan Hansen star Ben Platt, who reprised his Broadway role in the adaptation) secured the film rights to the musical. Very little material from Emmich's novel adaptation is used in the film, which was scripted by Levenson and directed by Stephen Chbosky. The film premiered at the 2021 Toronto International Film Festival on September 9, 2021, followed by a theatrical release on September 24, 2021.

== Personal life ==
Emmich lives in Jersey City, New Jersey, with his wife, who is a teacher, and their two children. He is also a teacher himself.

== Discography ==
=== Albums ===
- Slow Down Kid (2003)
- Slow Down Kid [Sony/Epic] (2004)
- Sunlight Searchparty (2006)
- Songs, Volume 1: Woodstock (2007)
- Little Daggers (2008)
- Looking For A Feeling You Never Knew You Needed (2010)
- Aide Memoire (2011)
- Bulldozzzer (2012)
- Whatever's Chasing You (2016)
- Tizzy (2019)
- Acting the Optimist (2020)
- Mean (2021)
- Starburst (2022)
- Asleep in Your Clothes (2023)
- Here Comes The Dark (2025)

=== EPs ===
- The Reception (2002), with Hero Pattern
- The Fifteen Minute Relationship (2002)
- Ton Papa (Vinyl) (2011)
- Pack Your Bags, Pack Your Heart (2014)
- Autobio: Part One (2014)
- The Good Names Are Taken (2015)
- Autobio: Part Two (2018)

=== Singles ===
- "American Girl" (2008)
- "Snowy Day" (2009)
- "Hard To Hurt Someone" (2011)
- "Lately The Crazy" (2018)
- "Party Mood" (2018)
- "Cave" (2018)

=== Compilation ===
- Posthaste (2001–2012) (2012)
