= The Spoils of War (Game of Thrones) =

- Game of Thrones episode
- Episode no.: Season 7 Episode 4
- Directed by: Matt Shakman
- Written by: David Benioff; D. B. Weiss
- Cinematography by: Robert McLachlan
- Editing by: Katie Weiland
- Original air date: August 6, 2017
- Running time: 49 minutes

Guest appearances
- James Faulkner as Randyll Tarly; Tom Hopper as Dickon Tarly; Ellie Kendrick as Meera Reed; Mark Gatiss as Tycho Nestoris; Brendan Cowell as Harrag; Daniel Portman as Podrick Payne; Danny Kirrane as Henk; Joseph Quinn as Koner; Staz Nair as Qhono; Noah Syndergaard as Lannister soldier (uncredited)

Episode chronology
← Previous "The Queen's Justice"	Next → "Eastwatch"
- Game of Thrones season 7

"The Spoils of War" is the fourth episode of the seventh season of HBO's fantasy television series Game of Thrones, and the 64th overall. It was written by series co-creators David Benioff and D. B. Weiss, and directed by Matt Shakman. It is the shortest episode of the series, with a running time of 49 minutes.

At Dragonstone, Daenerys Targaryen and Jon Snow observe cave drawings left by the Children of the Forest, indicating that the First Men and the Children fought together against the White Walkers. In King's Landing, Cersei Lannister seeks further investment from the Iron Bank, after reassuring them that their debt will soon be paid. In the North, Arya Stark returns to Winterfell, reunites with her siblings, Sansa and Bran Stark, and spars with Brienne of Tarth. On the road to King's Landing, Jaime Lannister, Bronn, and the Lannister and Tarly armies are caught in an attack led by Daenerys, her dragon Drogon, and the Dothraki army.

The title of the episode refers to the Tyrell gold and other resources in possession of the Lannisters after taking Highgarden. "The Spoils of War" received universal praise from critics, with many hailing it as one of the best episodes of the series and listing the concluding battle sequence between Daenerys and Jaime, Arya's return to Winterfell and interaction with Brienne, and Daenerys and Jon's conversation at Dragonstone as highlights of the episode. It received a nomination at the 70th Primetime Emmy Awards for Outstanding Editing, and was also Nikolaj Coster-Waldau's pick to support his nomination for Outstanding Supporting Actor, his first ever for this series.

The episode set an industry record for the most stuntmen set on fire, with 73 "fire burns", in addition to 20 people being set on fire for a single shot. In the United States, the episode achieved a viewership of 10.17 million in its initial broadcast, the 3rd highest in the series. "The Spoils of War" also received multiple awards and nominations, including "Best TV Episode" and "2017 People's Choice Award" from IGN.

"The Spoils of War" marked the final appearance of Ellie Kendrick (Meera Reed).

== Plot ==
=== In King's Landing ===
Cersei and Tycho discuss the Crown's debts to the Iron Bank.

=== At Winterfell ===
Littlefinger gives Bran the Valyrian steel dagger used in the attempt to kill him in season one. He then tries to get Bran to tell him of his experiences after fleeing Winterfell, and is disconcerted when Bran repeats Littlefinger's earlier remark to Varys that "chaos is a ladder." Meera visits Bran to say farewell. Bran is indifferent to her departure, and Meera remarks that Bran died in the Three-Eyed Raven's cave.

Arya arrives at Winterfell and Sansa takes her to see Bran in the godswood. Arya is taken aback to find that Bran saw her coming to Winterfell and knows of her kill list, and Bran gives her the Valyrian steel dagger. Podrick reassures Brienne that she has fulfilled her oath to Catelyn; Brienne insists she did almost nothing. Brienne and Podrick spar and Arya asks to train with Brienne. They fight to a draw as Sansa and Littlefinger watch.

=== At Dragonstone ===
Jon shows Daenerys cave drawings depicting the Children and the First Men fighting together against the White Walkers. Daenerys vows to fight for the North, but only if Jon bends the knee. Jon remains resistant.

Tyrion and Varys report the pyrrhic victory at Casterly Rock and the loss of Highgarden; Daenerys questions Tyrion's loyalties. Considering striking King's Landing with her dragons, she asks Jon for advice. He notes that her followers believe she can change the world, but if she destroys a city, she will be just another tyrant.

The Ironborn survivors return to Dragonstone. Jon confronts Theon, declaring that his role in saving Sansa from Ramsay is the only reason he will not kill him for betraying Robb. Theon reveals that he has come for Daenerys' help in rescuing Yara, but Jon and Davos inform him that Daenerys has gone.

=== On the Roseroad ===
The Lannister caravan approaches King's Landing after the Tyrell gold has been brought inside the city. Jaime gives Bronn a large satchel of gold, but Bronn still wants the castle he was promised. The Dothraki attack, led by Daenerys riding Drogon. Daenerys has Drogon destroy the supply train Jaime was transporting from Highgarden. Bronn wounds Drogon with Qyburn's scorpion weapon. As Daenerys dismounts to tend Drogon's wound, Tyrion is shocked to see Jaime charge at her. Drogon breathes fire at Jaime, but Bronn tackles him out of the flame's path and into the Blackwater Rush, where Jaime begins to sink under the weight of his armour.

== Production ==
=== Writing ===
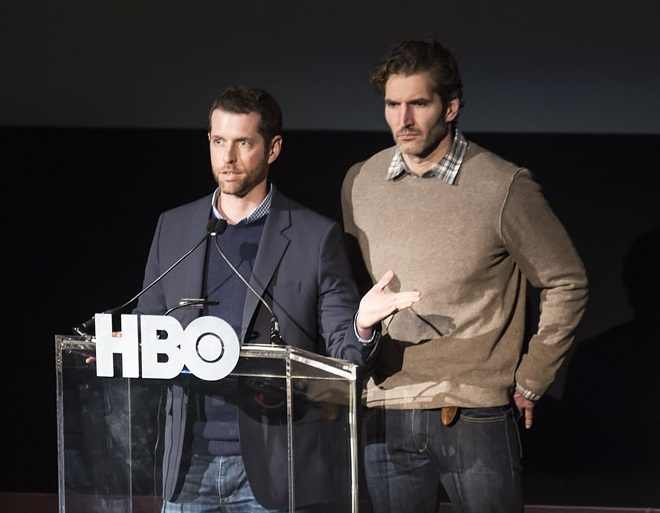
The episode was written by series co-creators David Benioff and D. B. Weiss.

"The Spoils of War" was written by Game of Thrones creators David Benioff and D. B. Weiss. The episode is the series' shortest episode to date. In the "Inside the Episode" featurette published by HBO following the airing of the episode, David Benioff spoke about the inspiration for the return of Arya Stark to Winterfell, saying it was inspired by Odysseus's return, who is also unrecognizable after making his journey. Benioff also stated that the important part of her return to Winterfell is her relationship with Sansa Stark, with Weiss following up by stating that the intention of the scene in the crypts where they are reunited was to "lay down the beginnings of the storyline where Sansa realizes what Arya is now."

Speaking about the revelation of the cave drawings with the Children of the Forest and the First Men, Benioff stated that the inspiration for the drawings were the cave paintings created by prehistoric men that were found in France, and that the scene was meant to be evocative in noting the thousands of years that have passed since the drawings were created.

In writing the battle between the Lannister army, and Daenerys' Dothraki and Drogon, Weiss stated that one of the most exciting elements of the fight involved the fact that two main characters were on opposite sides of the battlefield, and that it is "impossible to really want any one of them to win, and impossible to want any one of them to lose," according to Weiss. He also compared the introduction of a dragon in medieval warfare to using an F-16 fighter aircraft in a medieval battle. According to Nikolaj Coster-Waldau, in an interview with Entertainment Weekly following the airing of the episode, the script stated that "One of our main characters is about to die." Coster-Waldau also stated about his character, "Jaime is such an idiot that he thinks for a second, 'If I can do this, I can win the whole thing in a 'Hail Mary.'"

=== Casting ===
In addition to the regular recurring guest cast, Major League Baseball player Noah Syndergaard, then a pitcher for the New York Mets, made a brief uncredited cameo appearance as a spear-throwing Lannister soldier during the battle between Lannister and Tarly forces and Daenerys Targaryen and the Dothraki. In an interview prior to the season conducted by Sports Illustrated, Syndergaard spoke about his appearance in the series by saying "It's a dream come true. I think it’s the greatest TV show of all time, so just to be able to say I was in Game of Thrones is an unbelievable feeling."

=== Filming ===
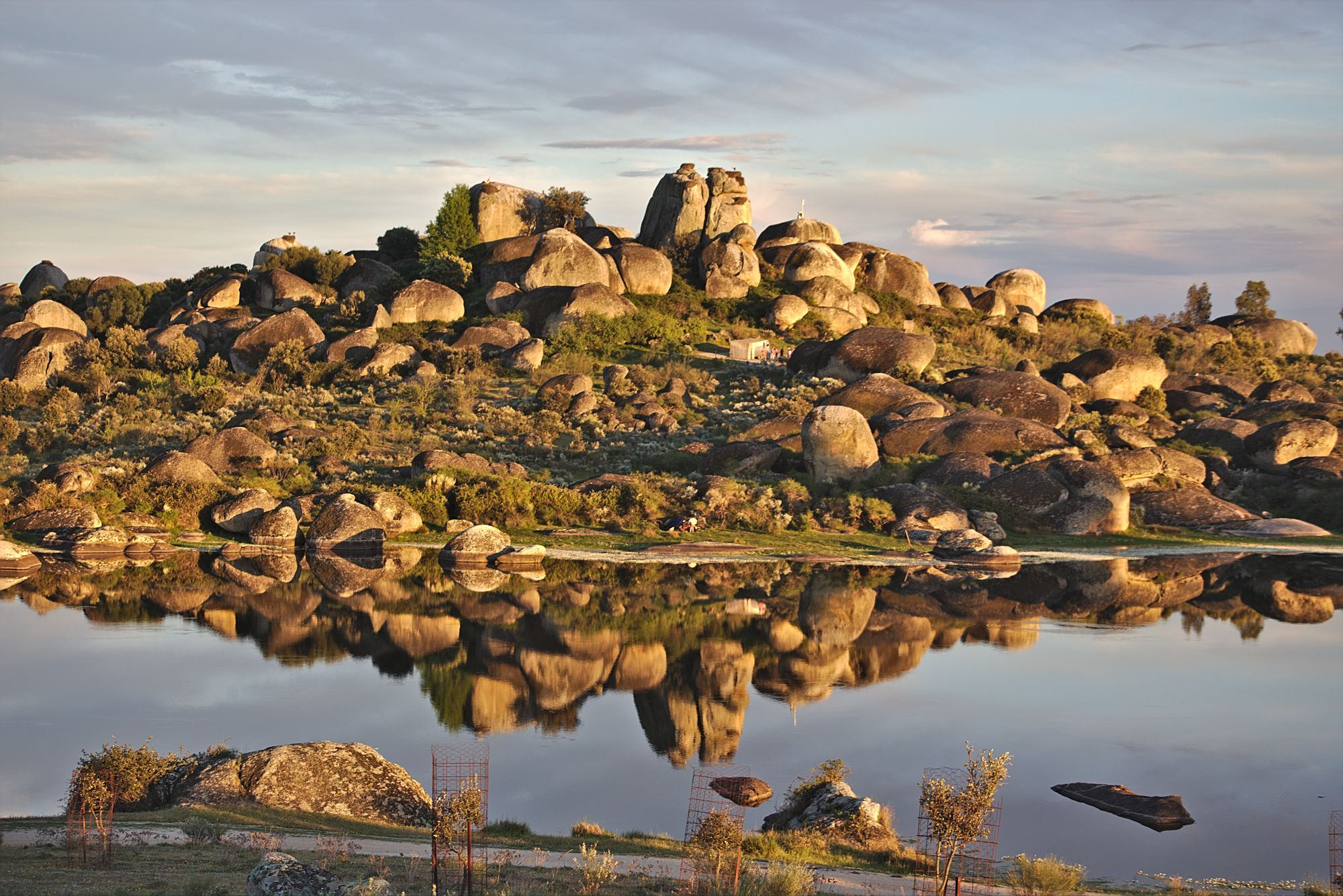
Part of the filming took place in Los Barruecos.

"The Spoils of War" was directed by Matt Shakman. This was Shakman's first episode of Game of Thrones, but he had previously served as a director for several other television series, including Fargo, The Good Wife, Mad Men and It's Always Sunny in Philadelphia, among others. The battle sequence at the conclusion of the episode, which was nicknamed "The Loot Train Attack" by HBO, set an industry record for the most stuntmen set on fire, with real fire being used, rather than special effects, to simulate the dragon fire being emitted by Drogon. There were 73 "fire burns," in addition to 20 people being set on fire for a single shot. Filming of the attack sequence took approximately 18 main-unit days, five second-unit days, and several weeks for the effects-unit. In an interview with The Hollywood Reporter, Shakman spoke about the first time he read the script of the battle, saying "I was reading the script and this battle began and I kept turning pages and the battle kept going on page after page after page! The excitement, the stress and the fear all built at the same time, mirroring probably what was happening on screen. It was a huge opportunity and a challenge. I spent the better part of six months working on that one sequence." The "Loot Train Attack" was filmed in Los Barruecos, Province of Cáceres, Spain, and Emilia Clarke, who portrays Daenerys Targaryen, was filmed riding a motion base on a stage in Belfast in front of several green screens. Joseph Quinn booked the part of Koner, one of the two guards, alongside Danny Kirrane's Henk, who mistakes the returning Arya Stark for a miscreant, with Quinn and Kirrane filming their part on set in a rainy Belfast. Quinn impressed Shakman enough with his one line of telling Arya Stark to "f*ck off", leaving Shakman not content with downplaying his talent and wish to work with him again to the point they eventually reunited for the Marvel Cinematic Universe (MCU) film The Fantastic Four: First Steps where Shakman cast Quinn as Johnny Storm / Human Torch.

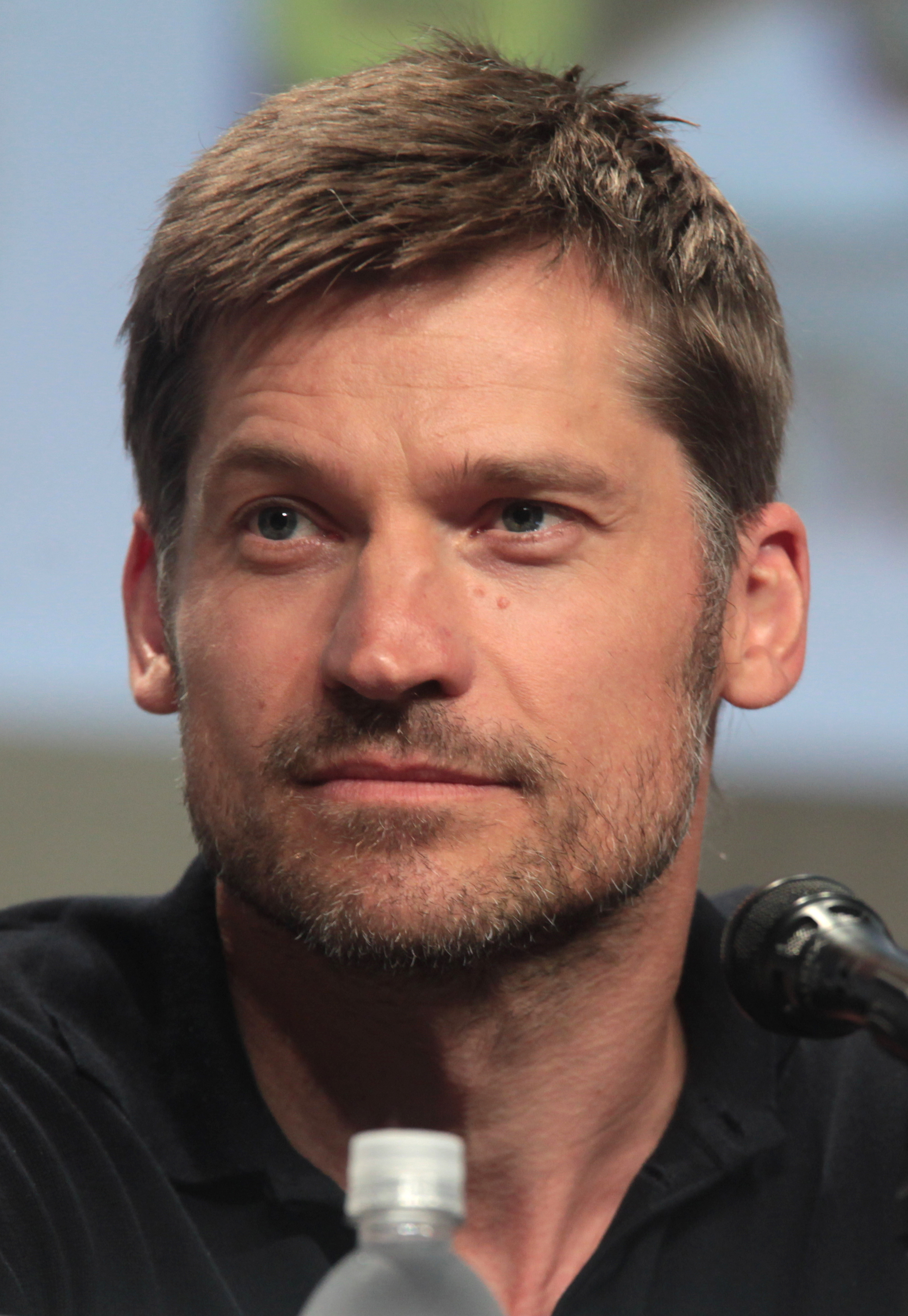
Director Matt Shakman chose Jaime Lannister, portrayed by Nikolaj Coster-Waldau (pictured), as the main point of view for the battle.

Shakman's first step in directing the battle was choosing to focus on a specific perspective, with Shakman choosing Jaime as the main point of view, noting "To see it from a traditional fighter like Jaime to see what happens when you introduce something like napalm or the atom bomb into battle and all of a sudden traditional fighting goes out the window." Shakman also noted that Tyrion was another important perspective for the battle, as he watches from afar, saying "We talked through every beat of what he was seeing, and then he imagined that in his mind and brought it to life. He's the human intermediary there to see the battle through." Shakman filmed Peter Dinklage as Tyrion about a mile from the battlefield, and most of his shots involved "staring at lots of different tennis balls" for eye line. Shakman drew inspiration for the direction of the sequence from Miguel Sapochnik, who directed the sixth season episode "Battle of the Bastards", and Neil Marshall, who directed the second season episode "Blackwater", as well as the battles in Apocalypse Now, Saving Private Ryan and Stagecoach. Shakman also revealed that he used the volcanic destruction of Pompeii as a reference, which led to the idea of some of the army being turned to ash. Costume designer Michele Clapton stated that the aftermath of the "Loot Train Attack", in which Dothraki warriors strip useful items and clothing from dead soldiers, was inspired by accounts from the Soviet invasion of Azerbaijan during the Russian Civil War and the subsequent "Week of Plunder". Clapton noted that combatants wore clothing taken from opposing forces, making it difficult to distinguish between Bolsheviks and Azerbaijani forces.

For the beginning of the "Loot Train Attack," with the Dothraki approaching, Shakman stated that he wanted it to feel like a Western, saying in the interview, "I wanted that feeling of a Western — this savage attack coming at this more formalized line of men, that tension of circling the wagons and trying to protect them from the chaos and the onslaught." Shakman worked with the horse mistress, Camilla Naprous, in order to show the Dothraki's mastery at horse riding, which included standing on the horse's saddles while shooting arrows. In order to accomplish this stunt, Naprous built what was referred to as a "metal shoe" that allowed the stunt performers to stand on the horses. The sequence continues with Drogon attacking the Lannister and Tarly armies, with special effects supervisor Joe Bauer noting that the number of shots of Emilia Clarke as Daenerys Targaryen riding Drogon increased significantly, with the entirety of the sixth season having eleven shots, while "The Spoils of War" alone had over 80 shots. As the stunt performers were lit on fire, they were required to hold their breath until the fire was put out, and specific attention was given to stunt performers in the middle of the shot, as they faced the brunt of the heat from the fire. Shakman also spoke about the difficulty in shooting the dragon sequence and the safety of the performers, saying "The most difficult was safety because you're dealing with fire, horses and actors — and those things don't do well in close proximity yet the nature of it was to create this Bosch-like nightmare where, as the scene progresses, it becomes increasingly like you're in the pit of hell. That was difficult."

Robert McLachlan who served as cinematographer for the episode, and previously was cinematographer for episodes including "The Rains of Castamere" and "The Dance of Dragons" in the show's third and fifth seasons respectively, was also interviewed about the process of creating the "Loot Train Attack." In an interview conducted by The Verge, McLachlan revealed that the production team received the script for the episode more than a year in advance. Several cameras were used to capture the "Loot Train Attack," including a small handheld camera known as an Osmo, which "allowed a horseman to get shots while riding a horse at a full gallop through the cavalry charge," as well as a "custom-built miniature helicopter drone" for the "overhead dragon shots." A cable-cam was also used, which made several passes over the battlefield during the course of filming. Going into filming, one of McLachlan's most desired effects was the amount of smoke on the battlefield, saying "we wanted to block the sun out so the shots would have some consistency. And I knew the fire and smoke would be incredibly beautiful." White smoke was used towards the beginning of filming, but as the battle went on, McLachlan decided to switch to black smoke, which was accomplished through burning diesel oil. This caused the crew to be required to wear masks and goggles, and raised concern for HBO's safety officer, who eventually prohibited further use of the black smoke due to health and safety concerns. Additional smoke was added later by the special effects team.

The number of extras that were utilized for filming the "Loot Train Attack" began with more than 600 extras, and gradually decreased as the weeks of filming went on, with 400 extras returning the following week, and ultimately concluded with approximately 100 extras, according to McLachlan. McLachlan also discussed the "oner" featuring Bronn, which he described as a single shot that "runs for as long as possible," revealing that the sequence was actually three shots that were stitched together by the special effects team, led by VFX supervisor Joe Bauer. He continued by revealing that the entire "oner" Bronn sequence was accomplished in only three takes.

In an interview with Entertainment Weekly, Sophie Turner, who portrays Sansa Stark, spoke about filming the reunion scene with Maisie Williams, who portrays Arya Stark. Turner stated that the two kept laughing during the filming of the scene, and that they couldn't "keep a straight face". She continued, "Our relationship is so close, but it's only that fun side, never the business side. I was nervous. It just terrified me. It's like performing for your mum. When somebody is watching you don't do it quite as well." Williams also spoke about the scene, saying, "It was the weirdest thing when we shot our first scene together. We were both embarrassed to do our thing in front of each other. It took a few hours for us to get serious and actually do it. Later it was fine on set and we could concentrate, but it was so hard to get into character with Sophie in front of me." Shakman also spoke about the reunion in a separate interview, saying, "It was fun for them, it was fun for us to see them work together, and same with Isaac when they all got together. They're all terrific, and they're amazing actors, and it was fun to see them come together now as adults and navigate these much more complicated scenes than they had to do with each other years ago."

== Reception ==
=== Ratings ===
"The Spoils of War" was viewed by 10.17 million total viewers on its initial viewing on HBO, which was significantly higher than the previous week's rating of 9.25 million for the episode "The Queen's Justice". This set a ratings record for Game of Thrones, as the highest rated episode of the series to that point, surpassing the seventh season premiere, which previously held the record. The episode also acquired a 4.6 rating in the 18–49 demographic, making it the highest rated show on cable television of the night. In the United Kingdom, the episode was viewed by 3.015 million viewers on Sky Atlantic, making it the highest-rated broadcast that week on its channel. It also received 1.022 million timeshift viewers.

=== Critical reception ===
"The Spoils of War" received widespread acclaim from critics, who listed the battle between Daenerys Targaryen and Jaime Lannister, Arya's return to Winterfell and interaction with Brienne, and Daenerys and Jon Snow's conversation at Dragonstone as high points of the episode. It has received a 97% rating on the review aggregator website Rotten Tomatoes from 43 reviews with an average score of 9.2 out of 10. The site's consensus reads "'The Spoils of War' delivers arguably the greatest battle sequence of the series so far, in exciting, epic, fiery spectacle."

Matt Fowler of IGN wrote in his review for the episode, "The past three Thrones episodes now have ended with big action set pieces, but the Dragon/Dothraki battle down in The Reach, in "The Spoils of War," was one of the most gripping and magnificent ones to date. It may even rival "Hardhome" in terms of spectacle." He continued, "Game of Thrones pulled no punches and showed no quarter this week as we witnessed one of the fiercest and most engaging battles the show's ever produced, featuring major fan-favorite characters on opposite sides of the fight. On top of that, Arya, after seven years, made her way home to Winterfell and managed to best Brienne of Tarth in a friendly training session. There are three Starks in Winterfell right now, but with Littlefinger there poisoning the well, things still aren't quite right." He gave the episode a 10 out of 10. Myles McNutt of The A.V. Club similarly praised the concluding battle sequence: "The Spoils Of War" lives up to its title by reinforcing how much more fruitful war is as a storytelling mechanism at this point in the series' life." He also compared the episode to the previous episode, "The Queen's Justice", which had two battles that largely took place off-screen, writing "Here, the battle is told through multiple perspectives, each vested with meaning and purpose: our point-of-view shifts between Dany and Drogon and Jaime and Bronn, before eventually adding Tyrion watching from afar, and the direction from first-time Thrones director Matt Shakman uses those POV very carefully." He concluded his review by saying "The Spoils Of War" anchors itself on characters whose stories are far from over, and crafts a reunion and a battle sequence that end no stories and yet draw meaning from the fact that technically, at this point, any story could end at any moment." He gave the episode an A−. James Hibberd of Entertainment Weekly gave the episode an A, writing in his review, "All the leaks in the world couldn't wreck 'The Spoils of War'. Game of Thrones' shortest episode ever — and part of the show's fastest-paced season ever — didn’t feel rushed at all, and the story's impact remained incredibly strong no matter what you knew ahead of time."

=== Accolades ===
Year	Award	Category	Nominee(s)	Result	Ref.
2017	American Society of Cinematographers Awards	Outstanding Achievement in Cinematography in Regular Series for Non-Commercial Television	Robert McLachlan	Nominated	
2017	IGN Awards	Best TV Episode		Won	
2017	IGN People's Choice Award	Best TV Episode		Won	
2017	Hollywood Post Alliance	Outstanding Sound	Tim Kimmel, Paula Fairfield, Mathew Waters, Onnalee Blank, Bradley C. Katona, Paul Bercovitch	Nominated	
2018	Directors Guild of America Awards	Dramatic Series	Matt Shakman	Nominated	
2018	Visual Effects Society Awards	Outstanding Animated Character in an Episode or Real-Time Project	Murray Stevenson, Jason Snyman, Jenn Taylor, Florian Friedmann – "Drogon Loot Train Attack"	Won	
2018	Visual Effects Society Awards	Outstanding Compositing in a Photoreal Episode	Dom Hellier, Thijs Noij, Edwin Holdsworth, Giacomo Matteucci – "Loot Train Attack"	Won	
2018	Golden Reel Awards	Best Sound Editing in Television, Short Form: FX/Foley	Tim Kimmel, Paula Fairfield, Bradley Katona, Brett Voss and Jeffrey Wilhoit	Won	
2018	Golden Reel Awards	Best Sound Editing in Television, Short Form: Dialogue / ADR	Tim Kimmel, Paul Bercovitch and Tim Hands	Won	
2018	2018 Gold Derby Awards	Best Drama Episode		Nominated	
2018	Primetime Emmy Awards	Outstanding Supporting Actor in a Drama Series	Nikolaj Coster-Waldau as Jaime Lannister	Nominated	
2018	Primetime Creative Arts Emmy Awards	Outstanding Single-Camera Picture Editing for a Drama series	Katie Weiland	Nominated	
2018	Primetime Creative Arts Emmy Awards	Outstanding Sound Editing for a Comedy or Drama series	Tim Kimmel, Paula Fairfield, Tim Hands, Paul Bercovitch, Bradley C. Katona, John Matter, Brett Voss, David Klotz, Jeffrey Wilhoit, Dylan Tuomy-Wilhoit	Nominated	
2018	Asian Academy Creative Awards	Best Visual or Special FX in a TV Series	Method Studios	Won	

== Leak ==
On August 4, 2017, it was reported that, two days before its original broadcast, the episode was leaked online from Star India, one of HBO's international network partners. Four suspects were arrested over the leak in Mumbai. Three of them were current employees of Prime Focus Technologies, an independent company that handles Star India's data; the fourth was a former employee.
