= Matt Shakman =

American filmmaker (born 1975)

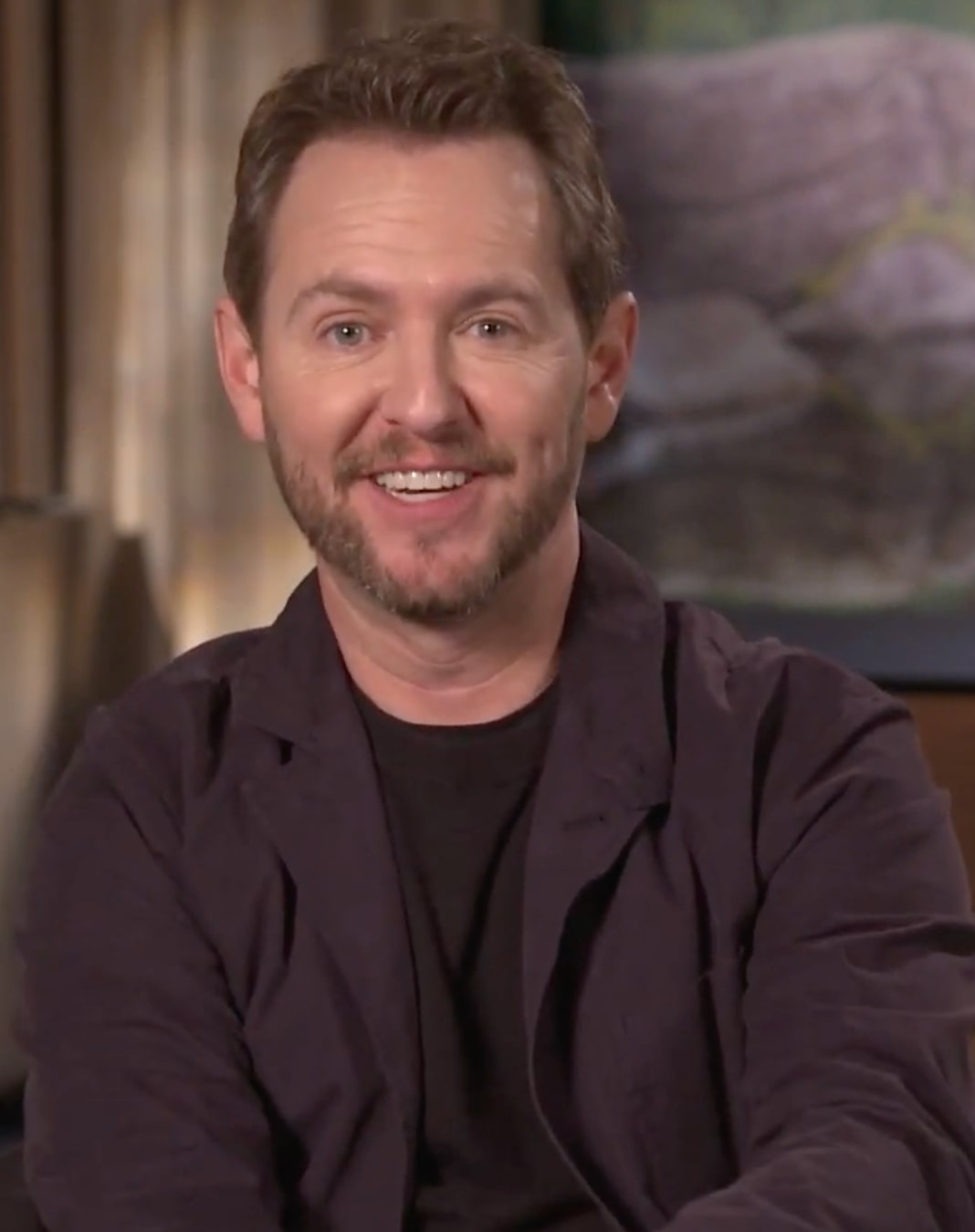
- Shakman in 2023
- Born: August 8, 1975 (age 51); Ventura, California, U.S.
- Education: Yale University (BA)
- Occupations: Film director; television director; theatre director; actor
- Years active: 1984–present
- Spouse: Maggie Malone (m. 2012)
- Children: 1

Matt Shakman (born August 8, 1975) is an American director and former child actor. He is best known for directing the Marvel Cinematic Universe miniseries WandaVision (2021) and the film The Fantastic Four: First Steps (2025). He has also directed episodes of The Great, It's Always Sunny in Philadelphia, Fargo and Game of Thrones. He was the artistic director of the Geffen Playhouse in Los Angeles, California from 2017 to 2023.

== Early life ==
Shakman was born and raised in Ventura, California. His Jewish father and Catholic mother maintained a "relatively secular household", their interfaith marriage being a source of conflict with Shakman's Jewish paternal grandmother. After acting as a child, starting with commercials and landing a series regular role on Just the Ten of Us, he stepped away to attend The Thacher School in Ojai.

Shakman went on to attend Yale University where he graduated with an art history and theater double major and was a member of Skull and Bones. It was at Yale where Shakman became interested in theatre, going on to direct a number of stage productions.

After university, Shakman lived in New York City for several years before permanently moving to Los Angeles. He married Maggie Malone in 2012. In 2016, they had a daughter named Maisie.

== Career ==
As a child actor, Shakman played Graham "J.R." Lubbock, Jr. in the Growing Pains spin-off series Just the Ten of Us (1988–1990). His other television acting credits include The Facts of Life, Highway to Heaven, Diff'rent Strokes, Night Court, Good Morning, Miss Bliss and Webster. He also appeared in the films A Night at the Magic Castle (1988), and Meet the Hollowheads (1989).

Shakman is the founder and Artistic Director of the Black Dahlia Theatre (BDT) in Los Angeles, which was named one of "a dozen young American companies you need to know" by American Theatre Magazine.

Since 2002, Shakman has mostly been directing for television. Among his credits include Succession, Mad Men, Six Feet Under, The Boys, The Great, House M.D., Fargo, and It's Always Sunny in Philadelphia (also executive producer).

Shakman directed the episodes "The Spoils of War" and "Eastwatch" for the seventh season of the HBO series Game of Thrones in 2017. In August of the same year, Shakman was appointed as the new artistic director of the Geffen Playhouse in Los Angeles.

In 2017, TriStar Pictures announced that Shakman would direct its upcoming "live-action/hybrid" film adaptation of The Phantom Tollbooth. In 2018, Shakman exited the project due to scheduling conflicts.

In 2021, Shakman directed and executive produced the Marvel Studios miniseries WandaVision for Disney+. Later that year, it was revealed that Shakman would direct a film in the Star Trek franchise. In late August 2022, Shakman was in early talks to direct the Marvel Studios film The Fantastic Four: First Steps (2025), replacing Jon Watts, director of the first three MCU Spider-Man films, who exited the project to take a break from the superhero genre. On August 26, 2022, Shakman exited the Star Trek film, citing "scheduling issues", before being confirmed as the Fantastic Four director just weeks later. When asked why he chose to do Fantastic Four over Star Trek, Shakman said: "[M]ovies have different journeys and momentums and schedules are a little bit mercurial, and so when the Fantastic Four opportunity came up, it was just too hard to pass up, and to go back home to Marvel, a place that I worked on WandaVision at, with those people who are wonderful collaborators."

In May 2026, Shakman was set to direct and produce a new Planet of the Apes film at 20th Century Studios, reuniting with First Steps writer Josh Friedman. In November, Shakman had launched a production banner Foolscap.

== Filmography ==
Film

- Cut Bank (2014)
- The Fantastic Four: First Steps (2025)

TV series

| Year | Title | Director | Executive Producer | Episode(s) |
|---|---|---|---|---|
| 2002 | Once and Again | Yes | No | "Experience Is the Teacher" |
| 2003–2004 | Oliver Beene | Yes | No | "Lord of the Bees" |
| 2003–2004 | Oliver Beene | Yes | No | "Ward Have Mercy" |
| 2003–2004 | Oliver Beene | Yes | No | "Idol Chatter" |
| 2003–2006 | Everwood | Yes | No | "Just Like in the Movies" |
| 2003–2006 | Everwood | Yes | No | "Shoot the Moon" |
| 2003–2006 | Everwood | Yes | No | "Since You've Been Gone" |
| 2003–2006 | Everwood | Yes | No | "Truth" |
| 2004 | Judging Amy | Yes | No | "Order and Chaos" |
| 2004 | Summerland | Yes | No | "Into My Life" |
| 2005 | Inconceivable | Yes | No | "Between an Egg and a Hard Place" |
| 2005 | Six Feet Under | Yes | No | "Singing for Our Lives" |
| 2005 | Boston Legal | Yes | No | "Death Be Not Proud" |
| 2005 | One Tree Hill | Yes | No | "The Heart Brings You Back" |
| 2005 | Huff | Yes | No | "Christmas Is Ruined" |
| 2006 | Kitchen Confidential | Yes | No | "Christmas Is Ruined" |
| 2006 | Everybody Hates Chris | Yes | No | "Everybody Hates Funerals" |
| 2006 | Everybody Hates Chris | Yes | No | "Everybody Hates Thanksgiving" |
| 2006 | Men in Trees | Yes | No | "The Buddy System" |
| 2006 | Windfall | Yes | No | "The Myth of More" |
| 2006–2007 | Brothers & Sisters | Yes | No | "An Act of Will" |
| 2006–2007 | Brothers & Sisters | Yes | No | "Game Night" |
| 2006–2007 | Brothers & Sisters | Yes | No | "History Repeating" |
| 2006–2013 | Psych | Yes | No | "9 Lives" |
| 2006–2013 | Psych | Yes | No | "Lights, Camera... Homicidio" |
| 2006–2013 | Psych | Yes | No | "The Head, the Tail, the Whole Damn Episode" |
| 2006–2013 | Psych | Yes | No | "Dual Spires" |
| 2006–2013 | Psych | Yes | No | "100 Clues" |
| 2007 | The Nine | Yes | No | "The Inside Man" |
| 2007 | The Riches | Yes | No | "Cinderella" |
| 2007 | What About Brian | Yes | No | "What About Marjorie..." |
| 2007–2012 | House M.D. | Yes | No | "Fetal Position" |
| 2007–2012 | House M.D. | Yes | No | "It's a Wonderful Lie" |
| 2007–2012 | House M.D. | Yes | No | "Brave Heart" |
| 2007–2012 | House M.D. | Yes | No | "The Dig" |
| 2007–2012 | House M.D. | Yes | No | "Chase" |
| 2007–2017 | It's Always Sunny in Philadelphia | Yes | Yes | 43 episodes |
| 2008–2009 | Ugly Betty | Yes | No | "A Thousand Words Before Friday" |
| 2008–2009 | Ugly Betty | Yes | No | "Burning Questions" |
| 2008–2009 | Ugly Betty | Yes | No | "Dress for Success" |
| 2009 | Weeds | Yes | No | "Ducks and Tigers" |
| 2009 | Hung | Yes | No | "Doris Is Dead" or "Are We Rich or Are We Poor?" |
| 2010 | Childrens Hospital | Yes | No | "I See Her Face Everywhere" |
| 2010 | Childrens Hospital | Yes | No | "No One Can Replace Her" |
| 2010 | Chuck | Yes | No | "Chuck Versus the Subway" |
| 2010 | The Good Guys | Yes | No | "Bait & Switch" |
| 2010 | The Good Guys | Yes | No | "The Getaway" |
| 2011 | Outsourced | Yes | No | "Guess Who's Coming to Delhi" |
| 2011 | Breaking In | Yes | No | "Take the Movie and Run" |
| 2011 | Happy Endings | Yes | No | "You've Got Male" |
| 2011–2015 | Revenge | Yes | No | "Duplicity" |
| 2011–2015 | Revenge | Yes | No | "Collusion" |
| 2011–2015 | Revenge | Yes | No | "Disgrace" |
| 2011–2015 | Revenge | Yes | No | "Madness" |
| 2012 | New Girl | Yes | No | "Fancyman, Part 2" |
| 2012 | GCB | Yes | No | "Pride Comes Before a Fall" |
| 2012 | Mad Men | Yes | No | "Mystery Date" |
| 2013–2016 | The Good Wife | Yes | No | "Je Ne Sais What?" |
| 2013–2016 | The Good Wife | Yes | No | "Parallel Construction, Bitches" |
| 2013–2016 | The Good Wife | Yes | No | "Oppo Research" |
| 2013–2016 | The Good Wife | Yes | No | "Message Discipline" |
| 2013–2016 | The Good Wife | Yes | No | "Restraint" |
| 2013–2016 | The Good Wife | Yes | No | "Iowa" |
| 2014 | Fargo | Yes | No | "A Fox, a Rabbit, and a Cabbage" |
| 2014 | Fargo | Yes | No | "Morton's Fork" |
| 2014–2015 | You're the Worst | Yes | No | "Finish Your Milk" |
| 2014–2015 | You're the Worst | Yes | No | "Constant Horror and Bone-Deep Dissatisfaction" |
| 2014–2015 | You're the Worst | Yes | No | "Fists and Feet and Stuff" |
| 2014–2015 | You're the Worst | Yes | No | "A Rapidly Mutating Virus" |
| 2014–2015 | You're the Worst | Yes | No | "Other Things You Could Be Doing" |
| 2014–2015 | You're the Worst | Yes | No | "The Heart Is a Dumb Dumb" |
| 2015 | Grace and Frankie | Yes | No | "The Invitation" |
| 2016 | American Gothic | Yes | Yes | "Arrangement in Grey and Black" |
| 2017 | Game of Thrones | Yes | No | "The Spoils of War" |
| 2017 | Game of Thrones | Yes | No | "Eastwatch" |
| 2018 | Billions | Yes | No | "Flaw in the Death Star" |
| 2018 | Strange Angel | Yes | No | "Dance of the Earth" |
| 2019 | The Boys | Yes | No | "Cherry" |
| 2019 | Succession | Yes | No | "Argestes" |
| 2020 | The Great | Yes | Yes | "The Great" |
| 2023 | The Consultant | Yes | Yes | "Creator" |
| 2023 | Monarch: Legacy of Monsters | Yes | Yes | "Aftermath" |
| 2023 | Monarch: Legacy of Monsters | Yes | Yes | "Departure" |

Miniseries

| Year | Title | Director | Executive Producer | Episode(s) |
|---|---|---|---|---|
| 2015 | Heroes Reborn | Yes | Yes | "Brave New World" |
| 2021 | WandaVision | Yes | Yes | "Filmed Before a Live Studio Audience" |
| 2021 | WandaVision | Yes | Yes | "Don't Touch That Dial" |
| 2021 | WandaVision | Yes | Yes | "Now in Color" |
| 2021 | WandaVision | Yes | Yes | "We Interrupt This Program" |
| 2021 | WandaVision | Yes | Yes | "On a Very Special Episode..." |
| 2021 | WandaVision | Yes | Yes | "All-New Halloween Spooktacular!" |
| 2021 | WandaVision | Yes | Yes | "Breaking the Fourth Wall" |
| 2021 | WandaVision | Yes | Yes | "Previously On" |
| 2021 | WandaVision | Yes | Yes | "The Series Finale" |
| 2022 | Welcome to Chippendales | Yes | Yes | "An Elegant, Exclusive Atmosphere" |
| 2022 | Welcome to Chippendales | Yes | Yes | "Four Geniuses" |
| 2027 | Wild Things | Yes | Yes | TBA |

== Theatre ==
| Year | Title | Venue |
|---|---|---|
| 2013 | Wait Until Dark | Geffen Playhouse |
| 2015 | Bad Jews | Geffen Playhouse |
| | Good People | Geffen Playhouse |
| | Secrets of the Trade | Primary Stages |
| 2002 | Den of Thieves | |
| 2007 | The Last Days of Judas Iscariot | |
| | Placement (by Blair Singer) | |

== Awards and nominations ==
- 2021: Emmy Award (nomination)—Limited Series Direction, WandaVision
- 2021: Emmy Award (nomination)—Limited Series, WandaVision
- 2021: Directors Guild of America (nomination)—TV Film/Limited Series, WandaVision
- 2020: Emmy Award (nomination)—Comedy Series Direction, The Great, "The Great (Pilot)"
- 2018: Directors Guild of America (nomination)—Dramatic Series, Game of Thrones, "The Spoils of War"
- 2012: L.A. Drama Critics Circle Milton Katselas Award for Career or Special Achievement in Direction
- 2012: LA Weekly Award (nomination) – Direction of a Musical
- 2011: L.A. Drama Critics Circle Award (nomination)-Direction
- 2009: Garland Award, Direction
- 2008: Ovation Award, Direction
- 2008: GLAAD Award, LA Production
- 2005: L.A. Drama Critics Circle Award for Direction
- 2004: Ovation Award (nomination)-Direction
- 2002: Garland Award for Direction
- 2002: L.A. Weekly Award (nomination) – Direction
- 1989: Young Artist Awards – Best Young Actor/Actress Ensemble in a Television Comedy, Drama Series or Special
