= Dave Hill (screenwriter) =

American television writer (born 1984)

- Born: Dave Hill; May 15, 1984 (age 41); United States
- Occupation: Television writer

Dave Hill (born May 15, 1984) is an American television writer. He is known for writing four episodes of the HBO series Game of Thrones: in season 5, "Sons of the Harpy"; in season 6, "Home"; in season 7, "Eastwatch"; and in season 8, "Winterfell".

Hill began working as an assistant to Game of Thrones executive producers/writers David Benioff and D.B. Weiss in season 2. In 2014, Hill became a staff writer for the fifth season and was assigned to write an episode. He was credited as story editor on Season 6 and executive story editor on Season 7, and wrote an episode for each. In "Winterfell", he appeared in a cameo as an Ironborn soldier killed by Theon Greyjoy.

== Television ==
Year	Title	Notes
2011–2019	Game of Thrones	Wrote episodes: "Sons of the Harpy", "Home", "Eastwatch" and "Winterfell"; Story editor Nominated—Writers Guild of America Award for Dramatic Series (2015-2016); Nominated—Writers Guild of America Award for Dramatic Series (2018)
2021–2025	The Wheel of Time	Wrote "The Dragon Reborn", "Daughter of the Night", and "Goldeneyes"
2025–2026	Fallout	Wrote "The Other Player"
