= Twenty Four Candles =

- Ugly Betty episode
- Episode no.: Season 2 Episode 14
- Directed by: Michael Spiller
- Written by: Veronica Becker & Sarah Kuscerka
- Production code: 214
- Original air date: April 24, 2008

Episode chronology
← Previous "A Thousand Words Before Friday"	Next → "Burning Questions"
- Ugly Betty season 2

"Twenty Four Candles" is the 14th episode in the second season, and the 37th episode overall, of the American dramedy series Ugly Betty, which aired on April 24, 2008. The episode was written by Veronica Becker and Sarah Kuscerka and directed by Michael Spiller. The title of the episode is a wordplay on the film Sixteen Candles.

== Plot ==
The story begins with Betty dreaming of the perfect birthday party, complete with a horse and carriage and her boyfriend Henry as her knight in shining armor. Her alarm wakes her and her family wishes her a happy birthday with Hilda giving her a pat on her butt, Justin giving her a customized cellphone, and Ignacio making her pancakes, before she leaves for her planned trip to the Poconos with Henry.

But as she arrived to Henry's place, she knocks on the door and shouts "Birthday girl's here!", only to have the door be opened by Henry's very pregnant ex, Charlie. Turns out she is in town for a parenting seminar that had a last-minute opening on the same weekend of Betty's birthday. Henry explains that Charlie just showed up and she can go to the parenting seminar alone. Betty suggests that they just stay in New York, so Henry can be a parent and still partake in some birthday festivities. Betty kisses Henry and says she will see him tonight.

As for Wilhelmina, the former Mode diva is trying to hide the fact that she has Christina at her house—and Christina is carrying the dead Bradford Meade's offspring. As Christina attempts to open the window in her room, Renee comes to her rescue. After she thanks Renee, Christina decides to light a candle and Renee freaks. She extinguishes the flame and says, "No. Candles. Ever." Christina calls Betty to tell her about Renee, but unfortunately Betty's cell phone does not have good reception, so Betty misses every other word. Hoping to get evidence, Christina put a baby monitor in the pantry, determined to find out what is going on. Wilhelmina shows up at Daniel's place to warn him about Renee, who is dating Daniel, and tells him to ask Renee about Stony Brook.

Meanwhile, Betty enters the office and approaches Amanda, who is decked out in a Kiss T-shirt. Betty notes that she is turning 24 (Amanda first guessed 40, and later 50) and asks Amanda what is the most romantic restaurant in New York. Amanda suggests Pemberley Inn, which makes Amanda want to lick Betty with her tongue. Betty then enters Daniel's office (just as he is Googling "Stony Brook".) He appears to have no idea it's Betty's birthday, and in retribution Betty talks him out of taking his tickets to see the New York Philharmonic in Central Park.

As Claire prepares to launch Hot Flash, Daniel and Alexis become concerned that the budget for the magazine's launch, so Alexis tells her mother that she will cut off the funding. This did not sit well with Claire, who is upset that her own daughter, the company CEO, would tell her this. Moments later in the bathroom, Betty sees her and as Claire tells her about what happened, Betty tells Claire that she shouldn't give up. Claire takes that advice to heart.

Renee enters Daniel's office and announces that she found an apartment right around the corner from his place. He balks a bit, and then asks her about Stony Brook, which Renee says is a state college on Long Island where she went to school. She is furious that he would even listen to Wilhelmina, and tells him to call her when he is ready to trust her a little. Back at the Slaters, Renee confronts Wilhelmina and asks why she is trying to break up her and Daniel. Wilhelmina says they both know what happens when Renee gets too serious with men. Renee claims that this is nothing like Stony Brook, and Wilhelmina reminds her that it took a lot of work to clean up that mess. Renee warns her sister to leave them alone or she will regret it, adding that she is sure she is not the only one around with secrets unaware that Christina is listening via the baby monitor and writes "Stony Brook" on a notepad.

As Betty makes reservations at the Pemberley Inn, Gio emerges from his sandwich cart to sit on her desk. Betty explains that it is her birthday and details the romantic night she has planned with Henry. Gio says that the only thing missing is a carriage ride. When Betty asks why he would say that, Gio just thought it was something she would be into. Betty tries to escape, and Gio says he is sorry they don't talk as much anymore. Betty says she has been busy working and living, then walks away. Betty then gets a call from Henry as Amanda listens in (only to have Betty to tell Amanda to butt out). Henry is carrying a big bouquet of gerbera daisies. As Betty gets off the phone excitedly as she sees Daniel coming toward her with a big present, but it is for Renee.

At the Suarez house, Ignacio is upset that Betty's weekend has been scrubbed because of Charlie, then pouts because he likes to have the family together for birthdays. Hilda thinks they can take the cupcakes to Henry's, so he and Betty can eat them under the stars at the Philharmonic. As Hilda drops off the cupcakes at Henry's place, Charlie is there to receive them. She tells Hilda that there is not going to be a birthday date, but Hilda corrects her. Charlie insincerely says that is great, and adds that Betty does not let anything get in her way. Hilda says she does not. But if anything is to happen, Hilda has her back. As Hilda exits, Charlie bites into a cupcake fiercely, then smiles. Hours later, Henry leaves a message for Betty, saying that he has to take Charlie to the doctor and tells Betty should not go to the restaurant, saying he will meet up with her later. He adds that he is so sorry, and that he loves her. But Betty's cellphone only gets part of the message as she heads to the restaurant.

Back at the Slaters, as Marc drops off baby supplies, Renee is there and tells him that her sister skipped the infant CPR class and made Christina go alone, in favor of a deep tissue massage. Renee offers to make Marc a chocolatini, not knowing that this was the opportunity that Renee was waiting for, as hours later, in a drunken moment Marc nearly ruins everything by spilling the beans to Renee about the baby Christina’s carrying. Renee later tells Wilhelmina that she has taped Marc's conversation and if she interferes, she'll expose her. When Wilhelmina becomes threatened that if the Meades find out that she stole Bradford's sperm she will go to prison, she sends Marc to break into Daniel's apartment to retrieve the recording, but while he is there Daniel arrives, Marc pretends that he is there to seduce Daniel, but Daniel knows that Wilhelmina is behind it all, so Marc leaves before Daniel can call the cops.

At the Pemberley Inn, Betty waits. To buy some time, she orders cheese fondue from the waiter, who thinks she is there by herself. Back at Casa Suarez, Ignacio takes a call from Henry and learns that he is canceling his whole night with Betty because Charlie is not feeling well, so the family decides to put a party in place. As the hours passed, the waiter grows impatient with Betty's presence, and asks her to leave. Back at MODE, Amanda sees Gio bring a piece of pie for Betty, then reveals to Gio that Henry called to cancel his plans with Betty but never bothered to give Betty the message, so Gio steps in and gives Betty a night to remember as he shows up at the restaurant with a carriage and shows her a night on the town. As Betty and Gio paint the town red, the family thinks that Betty maybe on her way home. However, it is Henry at the door instead. He says the doctor could not find anything wrong, and so he thinks Charlie was just trying to ruin his night with Betty. Hilda is quick to forgive, but Ignacio isn't so sure.

Back at MODE, Alexis sees Claire in the meeting room with other older women. Claire then tells her that Hot Flash will be ready for launch, as she has outsourced former ex-cons to help finance the magazine.

Back at Daniel's apartment, he tells Renee about Marc, and apologizes for letting Wilhelmina get to him earlier. Renee is sorry, too, and says that she hasn't told Daniel everything. He says she can trust him, so she tells him about Stony Brook. She was in college and had a breakdown, and then went to a treatment facility. She still sees a doctor and has to takes daily medication. It was a long time ago, she says, but she is still a little sensitive about it. Daniel thanks her for telling the truth, and assures her that he still wants to be with her, so Daniel asks Renee to move in with him. Unbeknownst to Renee, it looks like Wilhelmina has played her; as Renee called her sister with her plans, Marc told Wilhelmina that he had "retrieved" it (her prescription pills) which she hopes will make her go crazy. As they returned to the apartment, the two noticed the baby monitor, which had Christina fearing that they might be on to her.

Betty gets back from her evening with Gio and finds Henry sleeping on her living room sofa, but it is Ignacio who greets her. Betty is sad to have missed all of her family's efforts, but Ignacio admits it is mostly for him, because he likes to feel like he's still taking care of his little girl. Betty still needs him, she says, and his cupcakes. It is then that Ignacio stands up and walk to a small table where he retrieves a small box, it a present for Betty, left two weeks earlier by Daniel because he was afraid he will forget her birthday. As she go over the couch, Betty wakes Henry and he says that he is sorry that her birthday was not perfect. And as they embrace, Betty seems to have something else on her mind.

== Deleted scenes ==
Daniel's present to Betty in "Twenty Four Candles": on October 6, 2008, in an article published in Variety Silvio Horta answered a fan question regarding Daniel's present to Betty.

Q. What did Daniel give Betty for her birthday in "24 Candles?" Kind of random, but we didn't get to see her open it and I'm curious. — Cali

A. I was disappointed we didn't get to show this scene because it turned out to be such a great moment. We had to cut it due to time — the show was too long. After an excruciating day at work, which happened to be her birthday, Betty unwinds with Ignacio, who remembers to give Betty a gift from Daniel—he dropped it off a couple of weeks ago because, "He just wanted to make sure he didn't forget." Betty opens the gift to find a Shakespeare anthology. Inside there's an inscription: "Looks like you share a birthday with another great writer… Happy Birthday, Betty. Love, Daniel." The gift worked on many levels because Betty was writing an article for Mode at the time and it showed how much Daniel really cares about her. But we simply didn't have the time in the episode to keep the scene.

== Production ==
This is the first post-strike episode. It also hints at a return to the show's roots after enduring a series of over-the-top storylines, as creator Silvio Horta pointed out in a Los Angeles Times interview.

The episode aired on the 24th of April, 6 days after America Ferrera (Betty) turned 24.

== Reception ==
Entertainment Weekly's Tanner Stransky was among the reviewers who welcomed the show back: "How stoked are you that Mode is back in business? It's been exactly three months since the last episode of Ugly Betty aired. Three months! And just like the Suarez clan yearning for Ignacio's delectable flan, I've been craving my fix of delicious love triangles, devilish in vitro impregnations, and, of course, Willy's genius one-liners. And there was so much to look forward to: A new Meade magazine, courtesy of Claire! Dark revelations about Willy's sister, Renee! Some sort of resolution to the Betty-Henry-Gio love triangle! Hilda with bangs!"

== Ratings ==
The episode scored with a 6.0/10 and more than 8.5 million viewers in the US tuning in, beating FOX's Are You Smarter Than a Fifth Grader? for second, behind CBS' Survivor: Micronesia - Fans vs. Favorites.

== Also starring ==
- Freddy Rodriguez as Giovanni "Gio" Rossi
- Jayma Mays as Charlie
- Gabrielle Union as Renee Slater

== Guest starring ==
- Anthony Cistaro (Waiter)
- Liz Montgomery (Ex-Con)

== See also ==
- Ugly Betty
- Ugly Betty season 2
