= Los Barruecos =

- IUCN category III (natural monument or feature)
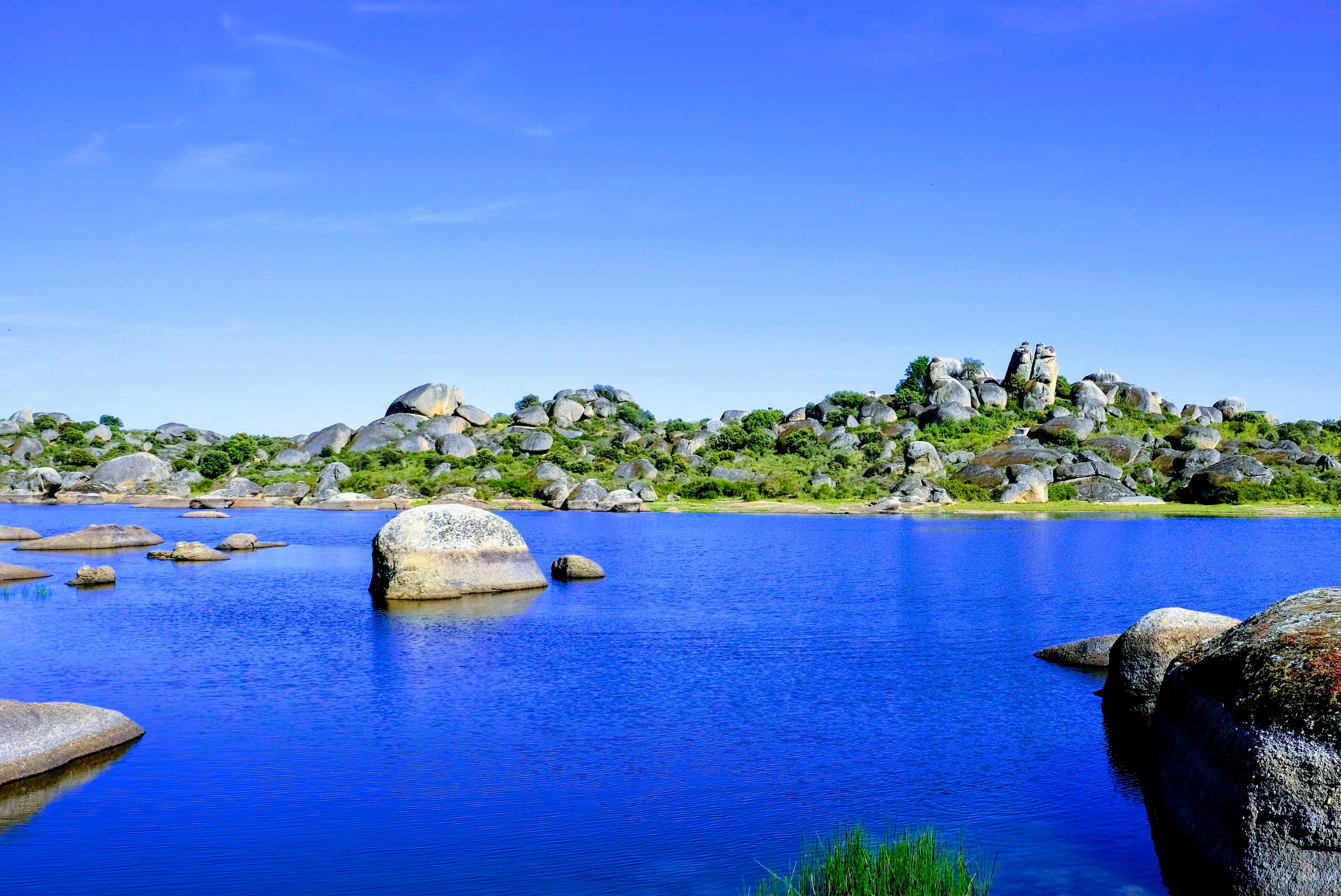
- Interactive map of Los Barruecos
- Location: Extremadura, Spain
- Nearest town: Malpartida de Cáceres
- Coordinates: 39°25′34″N 6°29′42″W
- Established: February 1996

Los Barruecos is a natural monument (Spanish: monumento natural) in Malpartida de Cáceres, Extremadura, Spain.

It is located in the municipality of Malpartida de Cáceres, south of the urban centre. The area features granitic formations with landscape interest, together with artificial ponds, used in the past as wool washers. It houses colonies of white storks as well as cormorants, grebes and black-winged stilts. The area also features a number of archaeological remains, such as rock art in granite shelters and anthropomorphic tombs carved in granite. The Vostell Malpartida museum of contemporary art is also located in the area.

The Junta of Extremadura declared the landscape as natural monument in 1996.

Game of Thrones' episode "The Spoils of War" was shot in Los Barruecos.

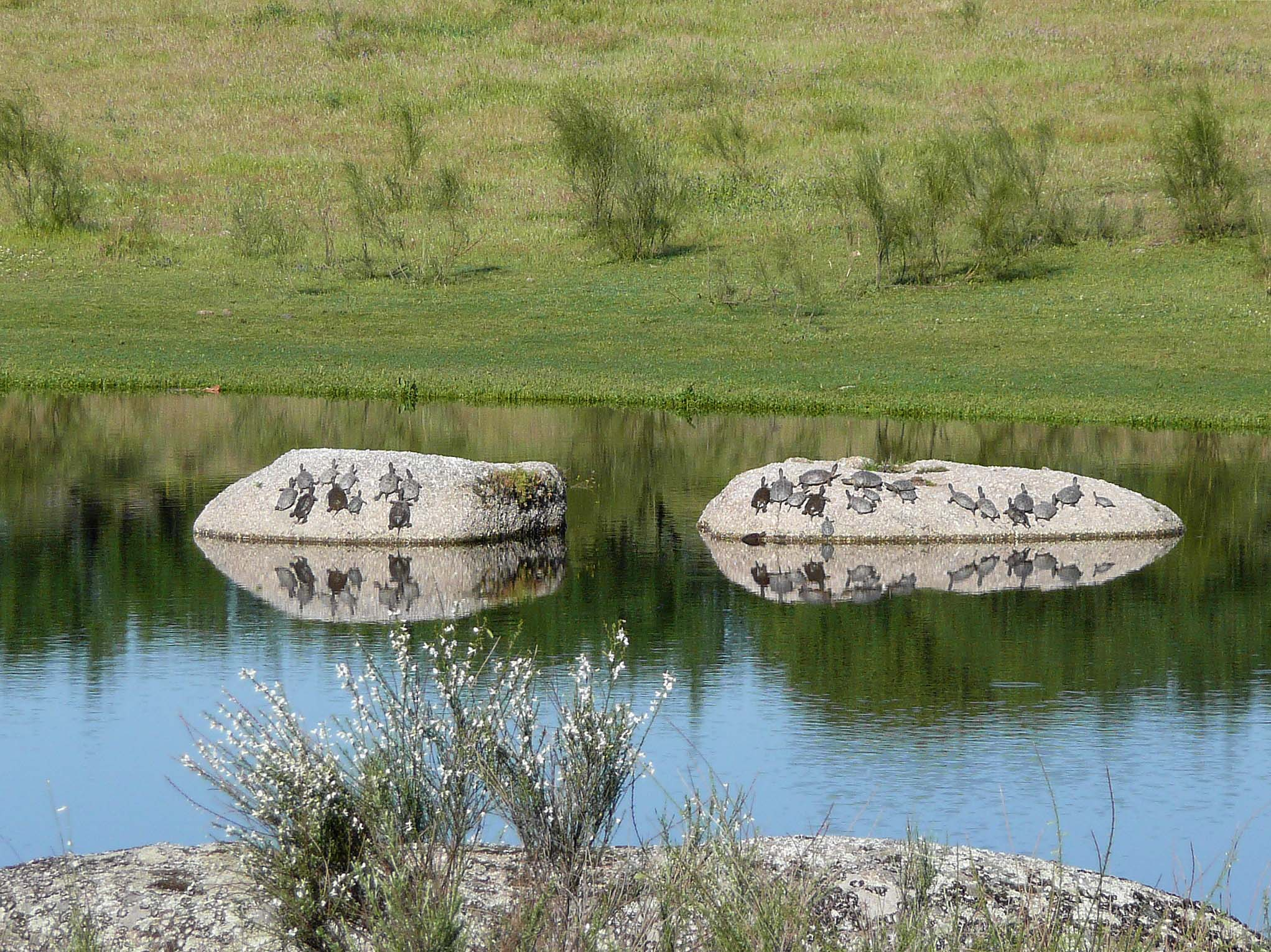
Spanish pond turtles resting on the granite rocks

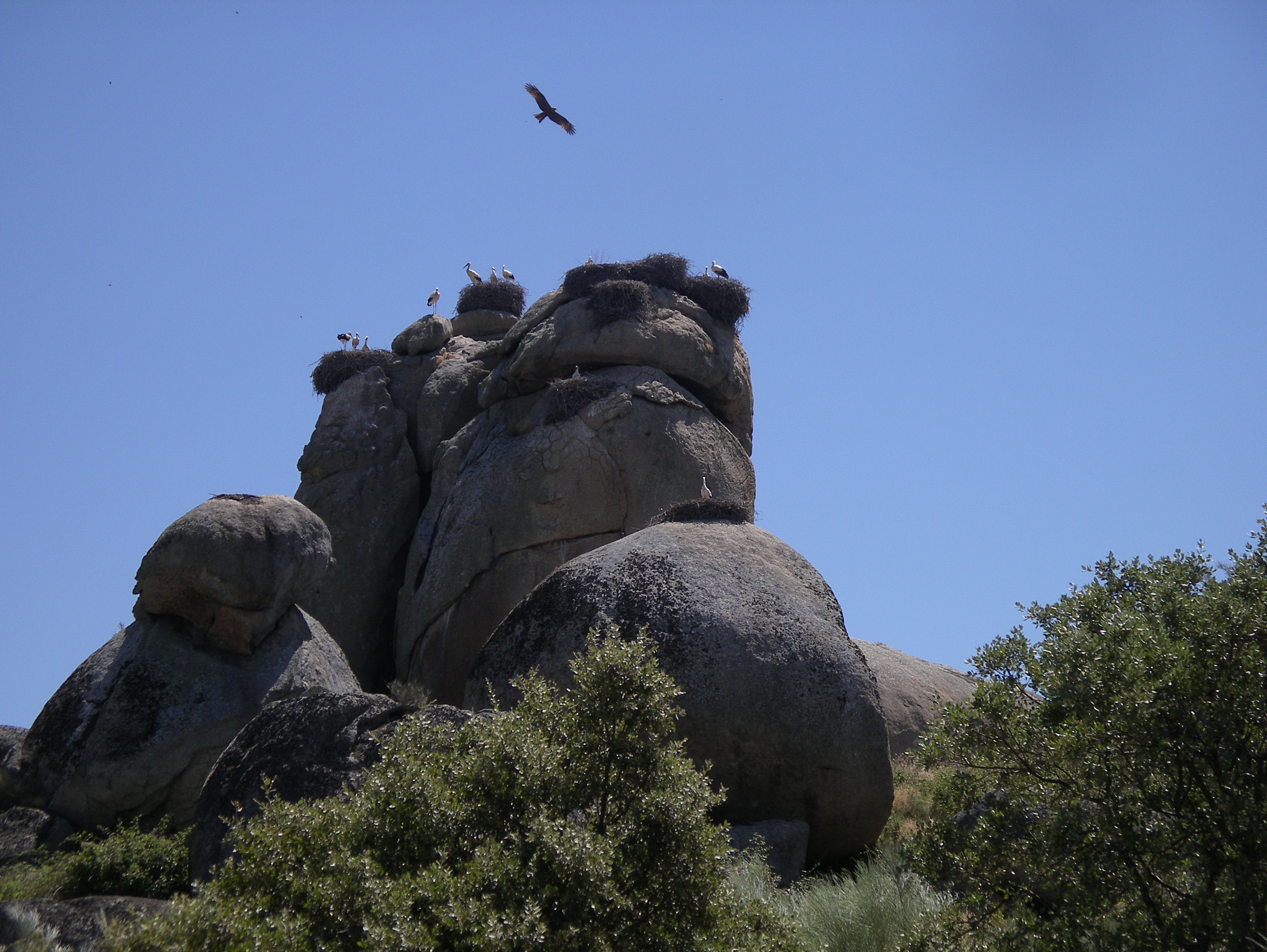
Stork nests

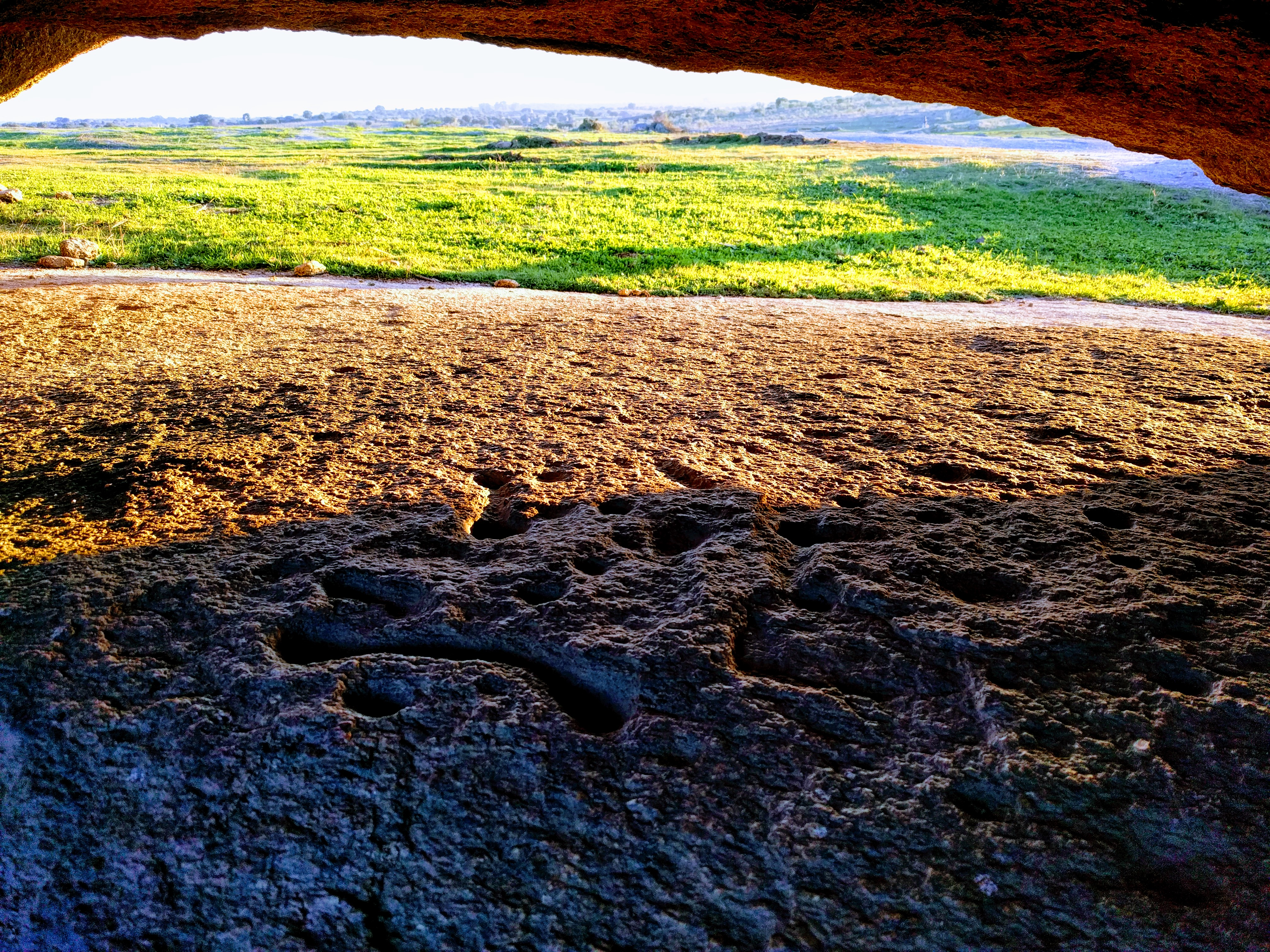
Rock art carvings
