= Winterfell (Game of Thrones episode) =

- Game of Thrones episode
- Episode no.: Season 8 Episode 1
- Directed by: David Nutter, George Lucas
- Written by: Dave Hill
- Original air date: April 14, 2019
- Running time: 53 minutes

Guest appearances
- Pilou Asbæk as Euron Greyjoy; Anton Lesser as Qyburn; Richard Dormer as Beric Dondarrion; Gemma Whelan as Yara Greyjoy; Ben Crompton as Eddison Tollett; Hafþór Júlíus Björnsson as Gregor Clegane; Daniel Portman as Podrick Payne; Rupert Vansittart as Yohn Royce; Bella Ramsey as Lyanna Mormont; Marc Rissmann as Harry Strickland; Megan Parkinson as Alys Karstark; Richard Rycroft as Maester Wolkan; Harry Grasby as Ned Umber; Staz Nair as Qhono; Rob McElhenney as an Ironborn soldier (uncredited); Martin Starr as an Ironborn soldier (uncredited)

Episode chronology
← Previous "The Dragon and the Wolf"	Next → "A Knight of the Seven Kingdoms"
- Game of Thrones season 8

"Winterfell" is the first episode of the eighth season of HBO's medieval fantasy television series Game of Thrones. The title of the episode refers to the castle Winterfell, where much of the episode takes place. The 68th episode of the series overall, it was written by Dave Hill and directed by David Nutter. It first aired on HBO on April 14, 2019.

In the episode, Daenerys Targaryen and Jon Snow arrive in Winterfell with Unsullied and Dothraki forces, after Jon Snow has pledged his allegiance to her. At Winterfell, Jon reunites with his Stark siblings Bran and Arya. In the Narrow Sea, Theon Greyjoy attempts to rescue his sister Yara, who is held captive by his uncle Euron. In King's Landing, Qyburn hires Bronn to assassinate Jaime and Tyrion Lannister should either survive the war.

== Plot ==
=== In King's Landing ===
Qyburn informs Cersei Lannister that the White Walkers have breached the Wall. Euron Greyjoy arrives with Yara Greyjoy as his prisoner. Euron and Cersei start a relationship. Qyburn visits Bronn and presents him with the crossbow Tyrion used to assassinate his father Tywin Lannister. Should Jaime and Tyrion survive the war against the dead, Cersei wants Bronn to assassinate them.

=== In the Narrow Sea ===
Theon Greyjoy secretly boards Euron's flagship in the night and frees his sister Yara. Yara decides to retake the Iron Islands while Euron is distracted by matters in King's Landing. With Yara's permission, Theon journeys to Winterfell to fight the undead.

=== At Last Hearth ===
Tormund Giantsbane and Beric Dondarrion lead their party into House Umber's seat of Last Hearth, where they find young Lord Ned Umber dead and impaled to a wall. Tormund declares that they must reach Winterfell before the Night King. Ned reanimates as a wight, and Beric burns him with his flaming sword.

=== At Winterfell ===
Daenerys Targaryen and her forces arrive at Winterfell. Bran Stark reveals to Daenerys and Jon that the Night King has reanimated Viserion and breached the Wall. Lyanna Mormont and the other lords express displeasure towards Jon for swearing fealty to a Targaryen. This tension is magnified when Tyrion declares that the Lannister army will soon march north too; Sansa fears that the combined forces might overstretch their supplies, but in private implies to Tyrion that she does not believe Cersei will send her army.

Arya reunites with Jon, Gendry, and the Hound. Davos Seaworth suggests to Tyrion and Varys that the Northerners could be won over by betrothing Jon and Daenerys. Jon and Daenerys ride the dragons, deepening their bond. Later, Sansa accuses Jon of bending the knee out of love for Daenerys.

Samwell Tarly meets Daenerys, who thanks him for curing Jorah of his greyscale, but after discovering his identity admits that she executed his father, Randyll, and his brother, Dickon. Bran instructs a heartbroken Samwell to tell Jon about his true Targaryen heritage as Aegon Targaryen, the news of which leaves Jon stunned.

Jaime Lannister arrives at Winterfell and is shocked when he encounters Bran in the courtyard, waiting for him.

== Production ==
=== Writing ===
The episode was written by Dave Hill, his final script of the series. The episode adapts material from the unpublished novels The Winds of Winter and A Dream of Spring, among them the released sample chapter "The Forsaken", in which Euron Greyjoy converses with a captive member of his family aboard his ship.

=== Casting ===
The episode saw the introduction of Marc Rissmann as Harry Strickland, the commander of the Golden Company. On preparing for his role in the season, Rissmann said, "I did some research into who this person was, where he comes from, and the books are quite precise. And then you see in the scripts what is there, what are the similarities, what are the differences. So I did a bit of research on that, especially since this world was so properly thought through. It's a functioning world, and that's why it's actually so appealing."

Jacob Anderson (Grey Worm) is listed as a series regular in the opening credits for the first time in this episode; he has previously appeared as a supporting/guest actor. Actors Rob McElhenney and Martin Starr and writer Dave Hill made cameo appearances as Ironborn soldiers killed when Theon rescues Yara.

=== Filming ===
The episode was directed by David Nutter who had previously directed two episodes each in the second, third and fifth season. The outdoor Winterfell scenes were filmed at sets in Moneyglass and Magheramorne in Northern Ireland, with indoor scenes filmed at Paint Hall studios in Belfast.

== Reception ==
=== Ratings ===
"Winterfell" was viewed by 11.76 million viewers on its initial live broadcast on HBO, and an additional 5.6 million viewers on streaming platforms, for a total 17.4 million viewers.

=== Critical response ===
The episode received largely positive reviews from critics, and is the best reviewed episode of the season. It has a 92% approval rating on the review aggregator website Rotten Tomatoes, based on 109 reviews with an average score of 7.72 out of 10. The site's consensus reads, "Though surprisingly bloodless, hard-fought reunions, bone-chilling surprises, and a welcome dose of humor help "Winterfell" set the stage for what should be an epic final season."

Sarah Hughes of The Guardian wrote, "This was a thrilling episode with its pedal to the floor, in which new alliances were made, old ones tested and long-awaited reunions occurred (hurrah for Jon and Arya's tenderly scripted meeting)". Emily VanDerWerff of Vox praised the episode's visual quality, stating, "For as much as I grouse about Game of Thrones, it's often casually stunning in a way that no other TV show comes close to pulling off". Ron Hogan of Den of Geek similarly highlighted the episode's pacing, while also praising John Bradley who "runs through the entire gamut of emotions in a very short time on screen".

Among the negative reviews, Willa Paskin of Slate criticized the show's pace, stating "Momentum, the idea that we are hurtling toward some conclusion that will explain it all, has been so encoded into the Game of Thrones experience that in the absence of any forward motion, the show is ... kind of dull."

=== Awards and nominations ===
Year	Award	Category	Nominee	Result	Ref.
2019	Hollywood Professional Association Awards	Outstanding Color Grading – Episodic or Non-Theatrical Feature	Joe Finley	Won	
2019	Primetime Emmy Awards	Outstanding Supporting Actress in a Drama Series	Sophie Turner	Nominated	
2019	Primetime Creative Arts Emmy Awards	Outstanding Single-Camera Picture Editing for a Drama Series	Crispin Green	Nominated	
