= Michael D. Wilhoit =

American sound editor

- Occupation: Sound editor
- Children: 2; including Lisa Wilhoit
- Relatives: Jeffrey Wilhoit (brother); Dylan Tuomy-Wilhoit (nephew)

Michael D. Wilhoit is an American sound editor. He won two British Academy Film Awards in the category Best Sound for the films JFK and Almost Famous.

In addition to his British Academy Film Awards nominations, he won two Primetime Emmy Awards and was nominated for three more in the category Outstanding Sound Editing for his work on the television programs Airwolf, Miami Vice and Misfits of Science.

== Selected filmography ==
- JFK (1991; co-won with Tod A. Maitland, Wylie Stateman, Michael Minkler and Gregg Landaker)
- Almost Famous (2000; co-won with Jeff Wexler, Doug Hemphill, Rick Kline and Paul Massey)
