= Burning Questions (Ugly Betty) =

- Ugly Betty episode
- Episode no.: Season 2 Episode 15
- Directed by: Matt Shakman
- Written by: Henry Alonso Myers
- Production code: 215
- Original air date: May 1, 2008

Episode chronology
← Previous "Twenty Four Candles"	Next → "Betty's Baby Bump"

"Burning Questions" is the 15th episode in the second season, and the 38th episode overall, of the American dramedy series Ugly Betty, which aired on May 1, 2008. The episode was written by Henry Alonso Myers and directed by Matt Shakman.

== Plot ==
Renee becomes increasingly jealous and controlling after her lack of proper medication begins to take effect, and convinces Daniel that Betty is in love with him; meanwhile, Betty and Christina discover her dangerous past. Henry tells Betty that Charlie will be staying in New York until the baby's born after she has a panic attack at the airport, while Betty grows ever closer to Gio. Gina Gambarro returns to Queens with a new life, and Mode tries to woo a designer who is only shooting for one fashion magazine.

== Production ==
Christian Siriano designed most of the outfits featured in the episode. He is the second designer to share a guest star/wardrobe credit in the series, the first being Vera Wang in "A Nice Day for a Posh Wedding". Amanda's outfit, designed by Siriano, was available for auction on the website for The Clothes Off Our Back Foundation, which auctions off clothes donated by celebrities to help children's charities and agencies.

== Reception ==
Entertainment Weekly praised Siriano's appearance and his dialogue with Alexis.

== Ratings ==
Although the numbers were down from the previous episode, "Burning Questions" did help Ugly Betty retain its second place showing against first-place Survivor: Micronesia, scoring a 5.6/9 in the US Nielsen ratings.

== Also starring ==
- Freddy Rodriguez as Giovanni "Gio" Rossi
- Ava Gaudet as Gina Gambarro
- Gabrielle Union as Renee Slater

== Guest starring ==
- Christian Siriano as himself
- Nina Garcia as herself
- Daniel Davis as Dr. Morgan Remus
- Jeff Clark as Larry Goldfarb
