= Eastwatch =

- Game of Thrones episode
- Episode no.: Season 7 Episode 5
- Directed by: Matt Shakman
- Written by: Dave Hill
- Cinematography by: Robert McLachlan
- Editing by: Katie Weiland
- Original air date: August 13, 2017
- Running time: 58 minutes

Guest appearances
- Jim Broadbent as Archmaester Ebrose; Richard Dormer as Beric Dondarrion; Paul Kaye as Thoros of Myr; Anton Lesser as Qyburn; James Faulkner as Randyll Tarly; Tom Hopper as Dickon Tarly; Tim McInnerny as Robett Glover; Rupert Vansittart as Yohn Royce; Richard Rycroft as Maester Wolkan; Staz Nair as Qhono; Kevin Eldon as a Goldcloak; William Nevin Wilson as Baby Sam; James Robert Wilson as Baby Sam

Episode chronology
← Previous "The Spoils of War"	Next → "Beyond the Wall"
- Game of Thrones season 7

"Eastwatch" is the fifth episode of the seventh season of HBO's medieval fantasy television series Game of Thrones, and the 65th overall. The episode was written for television by Dave Hill and directed by Matt Shakman, and first aired on HBO on August 13, 2017.

Daenerys forces the surviving soldiers to swear fealty to her, but the Tarlys refuse, and are executed. Meanwhile, Davos Seaworth retrieves Gendry, along with Jon Snow and Jorah Mormont, where they head beyond the Wall along with Tormund, The Hound, and the Brotherhood Without Banners. Arya Stark spies on Littlefinger and discovers a letter that Sansa wrote to her family, requesting their fealty to King Joffrey.

The title of the episode refers to the namesake place at which the final sequence takes place. "Eastwatch" received praise from critics, who listed Jon Snow's interaction with Drogon, Lena Headey's performance as Cersei Lannister, Gendry's return, and the tension between Arya and Littlefinger as highlights of the episode. In the United States, the episode achieved a viewership of 10.72 million in its initial broadcast, the highest of any episode in the first seven seasons.

This episode marks the final appearance of Tom Hopper (Dickon Tarly) and James Faulkner (Randyll Tarly).

== Plot ==
=== On the Roseroad ===
After the battle, Bronn pulls Jaime ashore and they recognize they cannot defeat Daenerys with Dothraki and three dragons on her side. Daenerys has Randyll Tarly and his son Dickon, who both refuse to swear fealty to her, incinerated by Drogon despite Tyrion's protests. The remaining soldiers bend the knee.

=== At Winterfell ===
Bran, who can see the White Walker army approaching the Wall, requests that ravens be sent throughout the Seven Kingdoms to warn of the imposing threat.

Arya witnesses Sansa declining two northern lords' suggestion that Sansa should rule the North and she privately accuses Sansa of wanting to displace Jon. Littlefinger surreptitiously lets Arya see the letter Cersei forced Sansa to write after King Robert died in the first season, asking Robb to swear fealty to King Joffrey ("The Pointy End").

=== In Oldtown ===
Archmaester Ebrose discusses Bran's message with other Archmaesters. Sam tries to get them to use their influence to prepare Westeros for war against the White Walkers. Archmaester Ebrose decides the matter needs further study. Sam transcribes a High Septon's journal as Gilly reads from it. Sam, frustrated with the Archmaester's lack of action against the White Walkers, steals documents from the library and leaves Oldtown with Gilly and Little Sam.

=== In King's Landing ===
Jaime returns to Cersei and declares they cannot defeat Daenerys. He also reveals it was Olenna, not Tyrion, who murdered Joffrey. Cersei is bitter over granting Olenna a painless death, but stays adamant in their war against Daenerys.

Tyrion and Davos sneak into the city. Bronn leads Jaime to Tyrion, who requests an audience with Cersei once Jon can prove that the White Walkers exist. Jaime conveys Tyrion's message; though Cersei doubts Tyrion's warning, she acknowledges that a temporary ceasefire could be strategic for Lannisters. She also tells Jaime that she is pregnant and will publicly acknowledge him as the father.

Davos locates Gendry, who eagerly leaves King's Landing with him. Two city guards discover Davos' boat; he bribes them, but Tyrion returns and they recognize him, so Gendry kills them.

=== At Dragonstone ===
Daenerys arrives back, and Drogon unexpectedly allows Jon to get close to him and pet him, much to Daenerys' surprise. Ser Jorah returns and reunites with Daenerys. Varys and Tyrion privately discuss the brutality of Daenerys' actions. Jon and Davos attend Daenerys's meeting with her advisors. Jon receives Bran's warning and decides to return to Winterfell to fight the White Walkers. Jon again requests her help. She refuses, because leaving her war against Cersei would mean conceding the Iron Throne to her. Tyrion proposes capturing a wight north of the Wall and bringing it to King's Landing, to show Cersei the danger and gain her support. Jon and Jorah volunteer for the mission. Tyrion and Davos return from King's Landing with Gendry. Davos advises Gendry to conceal his identity; Gendry instead introduces himself openly to Jon as Robert's bastard and volunteers to join his excursion.

=== At Eastwatch-by-the-Sea ===
Jon, Davos, Gendry, and Jorah meet with Tormund at the Night's Watch fortress Eastwatch-by-the-Sea, where the Brotherhood without Banners and the Hound are imprisoned. The disparate men discuss their enmities, but acknowledge that they are now fighting against a common enemy. Gendry tells Jon not to trust them, remembering how they sold him to Melisandre but Jon insists they are all on the same side against the army of the dead. Davos decides to remain at Eastwatch while the others head beyond the Wall.

== Production ==
=== Writing ===
"Eastwatch" was written for television by Dave Hill, who had previously written two episodes for the series, "Sons of the Harpy" and "Home", as well as serving as a writing assistant since the show's second season. In an interview with Entertainment Weekly, Hill commented on the intentions of the characters' decisions, and the writing and storylines that were involved in penning the episode. In writing the opening sequence involving Daenerys, and Randyll and Dickon Tarly, Hill noted the difference between Daenerys and other rulers, in that she offered the men a choice, saying, "These lords disobeyed her and disrespected her in rebellion against the rightful queen. Then she gives them a way out and they don't take it." He also spoke about the effect on Jaime of being defeated by Daenerys, noting: "This was their first time facing [Daenerys] in the open field and they were so easily defeated and that's not something he's ever seen before. But as hard as it is to deal with [Daenerys] and her dragons, it's much harder to deal with Cersei."

Regarding Jon Snow's departure from Dragonstone, Hill mentioned that Daenerys believes Jon is honest, and she "can't continue a war and still have Seven Kingdoms to rule after the war is done" as long as the White Walker threat remains. Hill's intention in writing the scene of Tyrion's secret meeting with Jaime was to open the interaction with "total antagonism and hatred", and eventually change it to the two "being vaguely on the same side." He notes that although Jaime may not believe Tyrion, it was worth exploring a possibility of a truce.

Hill stated that the writers were uncertain on when Gendry should be reintroduced to the story. He noted that the writers always intended to bring Gendry back, and that they had originally planned to bring him back in the previous season. They eventually settled on bringing him back in "Eastwatch" in order to place him into the storyline he referred to as "the big mission" with Jon Snow beyond the Wall. Hill added, "It made sense that Davos would want to save this boy who's like a surrogate son."

=== Casting ===
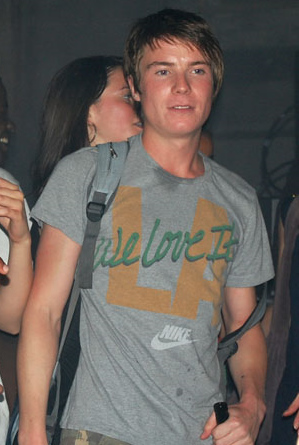
Actor Joe Dempsie returned in the role as Gendry in "Eastwatch".

"Eastwatch" saw the re-introduction of Joe Dempsie as Gendry, the role he portrayed in the first, second, and third seasons. In an interview with The Hollywood Reporter, Dempsie said about re-joining the cast: "In the intervening three years, I would always welcome the opportunity to come back to the show with open arms. I have so many friends on the show and have such a great time making it. I learn so much when I'm on that set." Dempsie also revealed that co-creators David Benioff and D. B. Weiss were unsure when he would be returning to the show, noting that he was told by them, "Look, your character is going to disappear for a while. We don't want you to panic. We're not trying to sack you. We like your performance and your character, but we have plans for him further on down the line." Dempsie learned of his return to the show shortly before Christmas 2015, during a meeting with his agent.

=== Filming ===
"Eastwatch" was directed by Matt Shakman, who also directed the previous episode, "The Spoils of War". Prior to joining the series, Shakman served as a television director for several other series, including Fargo, The Good Wife, Mad Men, and It's Always Sunny in Philadelphia. In an interview with The Hollywood Reporter following the airing of "Eastwatch", Shakman described shooting his two episodes (the other being "The Spoils of War") for the season: "There isn't the same massive set piece, so it's really about establishing what's coming next for the season. It's a bit of a reset. There are some major character revelations and further development of relationships, especially the people who are reunited and are now seeing what's happening as they navigate their new relationships with the people they haven't seen in so long." At the beginning of the episode, Tyrion Lannister is shown walking through the aftermath of the "Loot Train Attack," which Shakman noted was intended to show Tyrion's internal conflict between serving Daenerys and seeing his own family's dead soldiers. He also stated about the scene, "We created things for him to look at that were evoking Pompeii, the aftermath of the dragon fire and what it does to the humans all around him, as well as the destruction of the actual wagons. We walked Peter through that, and let him react to what he was seeing. The effect is pretty powerful."

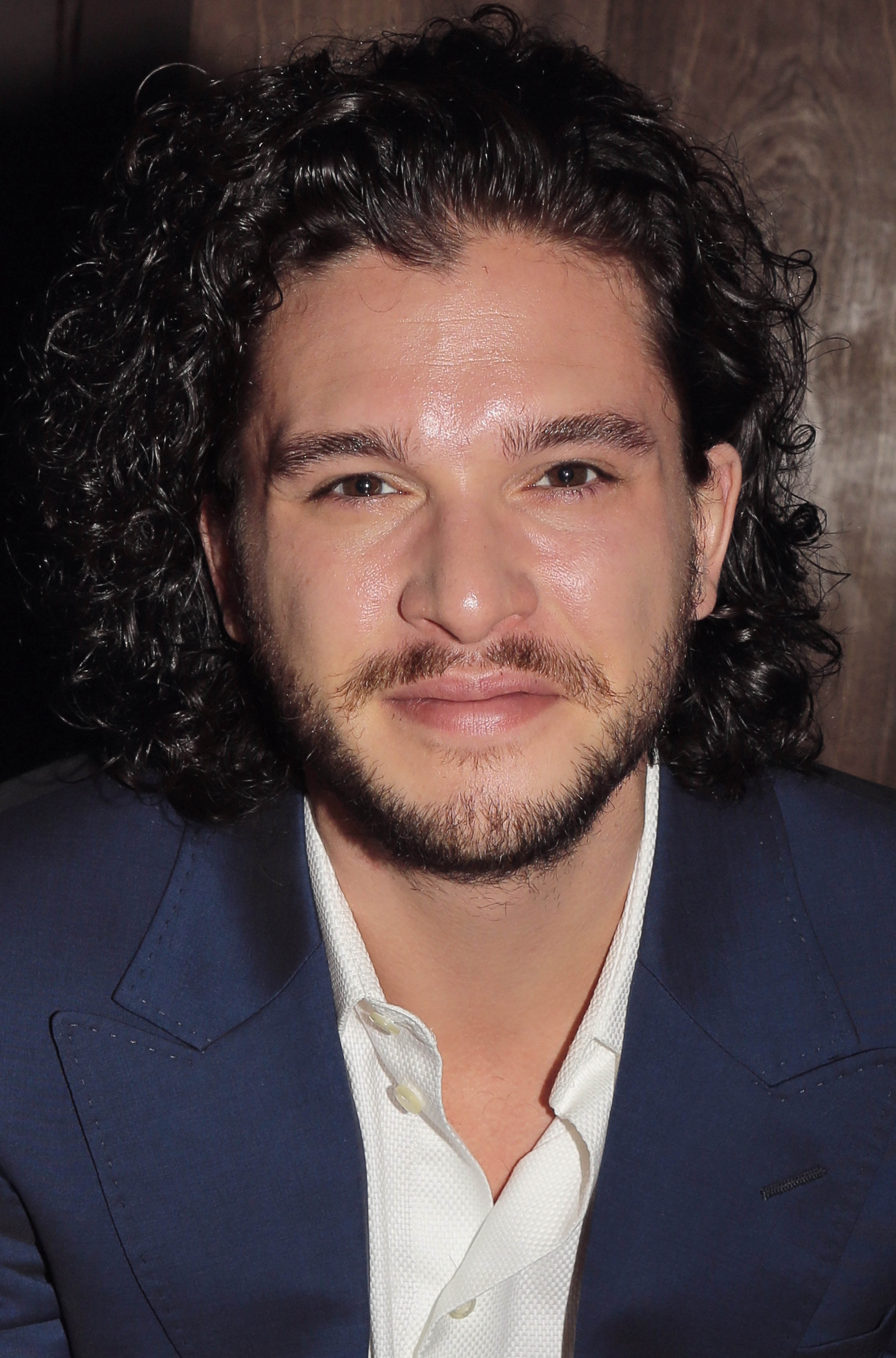
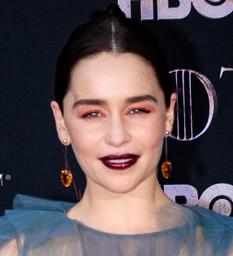
Director Matt Shakman stated that Kit Harington (left) and Emilia Clarke's (right) off-screen familiarity with each other lent itself to his directing for their interactions in "Eastwatch".

For Daenerys Targaryen's return to Dragonstone, and the interaction between Drogon and Jon Snow, Shakman spoke about the process that went into creating the scene, saying that "half the time Kit Harington", who portrays Jon Snow, was "acting with a partial dragon snout", and at other times "nothing, or a tennis ball in order to establish a proper eye-line." A "pre-viz" was also created, "in order for Harington to see a visualization of what the scene would look like after post-production was completed and to understand the enormity of Drogon." He continued, "It's tremendous acting, to be able to invent your scene partner, and to be able to navigate a scene like that. Bravo to Kit Harington."

Shakman also talked about directing Harington and Emilia Clarke, who portrays Daenerys, saying: "Even though they haven't interacted much on the show at all, except for this season, [Harington and Clarke] know each other very well. So there's a familiarity there that helps them as actors. They both have great respect for each other and are both very talented, so the scenes are relatively easy to craft due to the familiarity between them that works."

Shakman also spoke about the direction for the scene between Samwell Tarly and Gilly at the Citadel, noting that despite the importance of the information that Gilly was revealing regarding Rhaegar Targaryen, his intent was to focus primarily on John Bradley as Sam, saying, "I knew the information was huge, and there's no need to underline it at all. I put all of that information off-camera and pushed in on John Bradley as he was dealing with the crisis of the moment, which was his frustration with the maesters and ultimately coming to the conclusion that he doesn't want to be a part of it anymore. The fact that it happens to be dropping a giant piece of information about Jon's lineage and his claim to the throne, I felt it was better to have that happen without any kind of underlining." He also disclosed that the effect of this reveal will be felt in future episodes as Daenerys and Jon's relationship changes.

Additionally, "Shakman revealed that the meeting of characters at the Eastwatch ice cells at the end of the episode was shot all in one day, and that he hoped to have had more time to shoot the scene." He complimented the actors for their performances, however, saying: "there's just so much tension happening with everybody, and we're setting up this idea that this is a group of very unlikely comrades heading out to perform an impossible task. All of those actors are fantastic. Building the tension between each of them wasn't that difficult, given how smart they all are as performers." For the closing shot of the episode, Shakman attempted to pay homage to director Sam Peckinpah, specifically by referencing the 1969 film The Wild Bunch, for which Peckinpah wrote the screenplay and directed. He noted the scene was "meant to evoke that image of the Wild Bunch walking into town before the big shoot-'em-up begins."

== Reception ==
=== Ratings ===
"Eastwatch" was watched by 10.72 million viewers on its initial viewing on HBO, which was higher than the previous week's rating of 10.17 million viewers for the episode "The Spoils of War" This set a ratings record for Game of Thrones to that point as the highest rated episode of the series, surpassing "The Spoils of War", which previously held the record. The episode also acquired a 5.0 rating in the 18–49 demographic, making it the highest rated show on cable television of the night. In the United Kingdom, the episode was viewed by 3.42 million viewers on Sky Atlantic, making it the highest-rated broadcast that week on that channel. It also received 1.209 million timeshift viewers.

=== Critical reception ===
"Eastwatch" received praise from critics, who listed Jon Snow's interaction with Drogon, Lena Headey's performance as Cersei Lannister, and Gendry's return as highlights of the episode. It received a 95% rating on the review aggregator website Rotten Tomatoes from 63 reviews with an average score of 8.07 out of 10. The site's consensus reads "'Eastwatch' traded the fiery spectacle of Thrones' previous episode for a slow-burn approach, but nonetheless delivered some spectacular revelations and reunions."

Matt Fowler of IGN wrote in his review of the episode, "'Eastwatch' may have represented a breather in the action, so to speak, but it sure didn't lag. It was a masterfully busy episode, with big moments coming at you in each and every scene. Everyone's past connection to one another is now getting brought up, noted, and utilized to further plot in a meaningful, natural way.‘"He continued by mentioning several of the reunions and call-backs that took place throughout the episode, saying "From Sam having met Bran back at the end of Season 3, to Gendry finally returning to the show and meeting up with both Ser Davos and Beric Dondarrion (in the same episode), to Jorah finding his way back to Daenerys, to Tyrion's tense-but-fruitful reunion with Jaime – 'Eastwatch' was chock-full of the past becoming present, and being used to inform the drastic, dramatic war machine." He gave the episode a 9.2 out of 10. Myles McNutt of The A.V. Club similarly felt the episode lacked the action that the previous episode, "The Spoils of War", had, calling it a "piece-moving" episode, but noted "Whereas before you were seeing pieces moving into place to set up a set of four or five different climaxes to the season, here all of the moving pieces are taking place on the same continent, and with an impact on the same central story arc." He gave the episode a B+. Kelly Lawler of USA Today expressed similar thoughts by stating it was the best episode of the season thus far, and noting, "The series has needed to reinvent itself after it brought so many major characters together and narrowed its focus."

=== Accolades ===
Year	Award	Category	Nominee(s)	Result	Ref.
2018	Art Directors Guild Awards	One-Hour Single Camera Period Or Fantasy Television Series	Deborah Riley	Won	
2018	Visual Effects Society Awards	Outstanding Animated Character in an Episode or Real-Time Project	Jonathan Symmonds, Thomas Kutschera, Philipp Winterstein, Andreas Krieg – "Drogon Meets Jon"	Nominated	
2018	Visual Effects Society Awards	Outstanding Created Environment in an Episode, Commercial or Real-Time Project	Patrice Poissant, Deak Ferrand, Dominic Daigle, Gabriel Morin	Nominated	
2018	Visual Effects Society Awards	Outstanding Compositing in a Photoreal Episode	Thomas Montminy Brodeur, Xavier Fourmond, Reuben Barkataki, Sébastien Raets	Nominated	
