= Dylan Tuomy-Wilhoit =

American actor and sound editor (born 1990)

- Born: November 29, 1990 (age 35); Los Angeles, California, U.S.
- Occupations: Actor, sound editor
- Parent: Jeffrey Wilhoit (father)
- Relatives: Michael D. Wilhoit (uncle); Lisa Wilhoit (cousin)

Dylan Tuomy-Wilhoit (born November 29, 1990) is an American actor and sound editor. He won four Primetime Emmy Awards and was nominated for seven more in the category Outstanding Sound Editing for his work on the television programs Game of Thrones, Black Sails, Jack Ryan, Lovecraft Country and Masters of the Air.
