= Jeffrey Wilhoit =

American sound editor

- Occupation: Sound editor
- Relatives: Michael D. Wilhoit (brother); Dylan Tuomy-Wilhoit (nephew); Lisa Wilhoit (niece)

Jeffrey Wilhoit is an American sound editor. He won six Primetime Emmy Awards and was nominated for eight more in the category Outstanding Sound Editing for his work on the television programs Game of Thrones, Black Sails, Jack Ryan, Lovecraft Country and Masters of the Air.
