= A Thousand Words Before Friday =

- Ugly Betty episode
- Episode no.: Season 2 Episode 13
- Directed by: Matt Shakman
- Written by: Henry Alonso Myers & Sheila Lawrence
- Production code: 213
- Original air date: January 24, 2008

Episode chronology
← Previous "Odor in the Court"	Next → "Twenty Four Candles"
- Ugly Betty season 2

"A Thousand Words Before Friday" is the 13th episode in the second season, and the 36th episode overall, of the American dramedy series Ugly Betty, which aired on January 24, 2008. The episode was written by Henry Alonso Myers and Sheila Lawrence, and directed by Matt Shakman.

== Plot ==
Betty learns that an author she's been assigned to write an article on actually writes books on picking up women. Daniel dates a woman who happens to be Wilhelmina's sister. Amanda and Marc believe that they might have finally found Amanda's biological father: Gene Simmons.

== Production ==
Freddie Rodriguez had been signed to do 12 shows but was not sure about what would happen with Gio even though he became a fan favorite, while Gabrielle Union, who began her first stint in this episode as Renee, was uncertain about whether she would be a semi-regular and prior to the strike was supposed to make more appearances during the second season.

== Reception ==
There were some mixed responses from this episode. Some thought that, despite a great storyline, it lacked the edge that the characters have on the show.

== Ratings ==
The episode pulled in a 6.2/10, but like the previous two episodes, this one also placed second behind Fox's Are You Smarter Than a 5th Grader?

== Also starring ==
- Freddy Rodriguez as Giovanni "Gio" Rossi
- Gabrielle Union as Renee Slater

== Guest stars ==
- Paul Hipp as Phil Roth
- Gene Simmons as himself
